= Sam Corry =

American racing driver (born 2007)

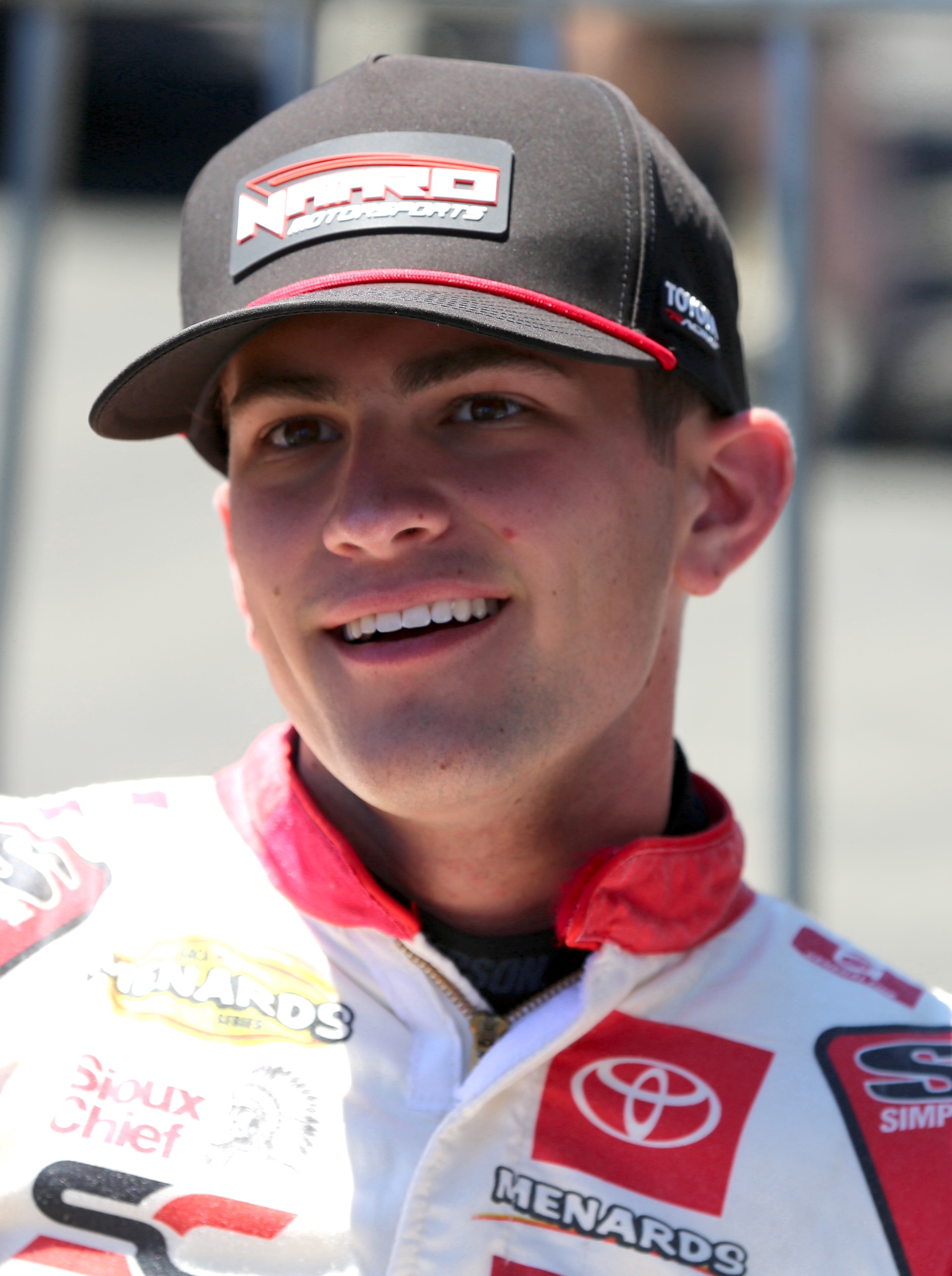
- Corry at Sonoma Raceway in 2026
- Nationality: (United States) American
- Born: November 14, 2007 (age 18) Chicago, Illinois, United States

USF2000 Championship career
- Debut season: 2023
- Former teams: Velocity Racing Development, Pabst Racing
- Starts: 18
- Wins: 1
- Podiums: 10
- Poles: 0
- Fastest laps: 0
- Best finish: 2nd in 2024

Previous series
- 2022 2022: USF Juniors; YACademy Winter Series

ARCA Menards Series career
- 4 races run over 2 years
- Best finish: 46th (2025)
- First race: 2025 LiUNA! 150 (IRP)
- Last race: 2026 General Tire 100 at The Glen (Watkins Glen)
Wins	Top tens	Poles
0	2	0

ARCA Menards Series East career
- 2 races run over 1 year
- Best finish: 36th (2025)
- First race: 2025 LiUNA! 150 (IRP)
- Last race: 2025 Atlas 150 (Iowa)
Wins	Top tens	Poles
0	1	0

ARCA Menards Series West career
- 6 races run over 1 year
- Best finish: 13th (2026)
- First race: 2026 NAPA Auto Care 150 Greg Biffle Memorial (Tri-City)
- Last race: 2026 NAPA Auto Parts 150 (Bakersfield)
- First win: 2026 General Tire 150 (Sonoma)
Wins	Top tens	Poles
1	1	1
- Statistics up to date as of November 2, 2026.

Sam Corry (born November 14, 2007) is an American racing driver. He last competed part-time in both the ARCA Menards Series and ARCA Menards Series West, driving the No. 25 Toyota for Nitro Motorsports, and the No. 63 Chevrolet for Spraker Racing Enterprises. He has previously driven in the USF2000 Championship.

== Career ==
=== USF Juniors ===
On December 30, 2021, it was announced that Corry would make his open-wheel racing debut in the 2022 USF Juniors driving for Velocity Racing Development. He would immediately be competitive finishing third in the opening two race of the season at Ozarks International Raceway. Corry would get his maiden win in the first race at the Mid-Ohio round after overtaking championship leader Mac Clark following a restart with six laps to go. The following round at Road America would see him get pole position for races two and three. In race one, Corry started third behind Alessandro de Tullio and Mac Clark respectively. Clark would have mechanical issues on lap one which meant that de Tullio assume the lead. However, Corry would overtake de Tullio to lead the race on lap two. He would battle for the lead in the remaining laps of the race with de Tullio, Nikita Johnson, and Andre Castro. Corry would win the race by just 0.030 seconds ahead of de Tullio. In race two, Corry would start on pole, but would get overtaken for the lead by Nikita Johnson five laps into the race and ultimately finish second. Corry would once again finish second in race three after starting on pole, this time to Alessandro de Tullio.

At the final round held at Circuit of the Americas, Corry would be on pole for race one. He would get overtaken by Nikita Johnson following the first corner and would later spin. Corry was third on the last lap battling Bryson Morris who was behind. Morris would edge out Corry in a photo finish by just 0.04 seconds which relegated Corry to fourth. In race two, Corry was in second with a few laps remaining and would once again be battling Morris who was leading. Corry would overtake Morris on lap 12 of 15 and pull away to take his third win of the season. In race three, Corry was battling for the lead with Nikita Johnson and Ryan Shehan. Corry and Shehan would overtake Johnson with Corry gaining the lead. Johnson overtook Shehan for second and then retook the lead from Corry the following lap. Johnson would pull away until a late race safety car came out closing the gap back up. Corry would not be able to overtake Johnson and finished second.

Corry finished second in the championship behind Mac Clark with three wins, three poles, two fastest laps, and eleven podiums.

=== USF2000 ===
==== 2023 ====
On October 11, 2022, it was announced that Corry would move up to compete in the 2023 USF2000 Championship sticking with Velocity Racing Development. At the third round of the season held at Indianapolis Motor Speedway, Corry qualified 12th for race one. Following two cautions for major incidents, the race resumed with five laps to go. Leaders Nikita Johnson, Lochie Hughes, and Simon Sikes all would run wide at turn one on multiple occasions. Mac Clark would assume the lead with Sikes in second with two laps to go. On the final lap, Clark ran wide at the turn one causing him and Sikes to miss the corner and go onto the grass. This allowed Corry to take the lead and hold on to take his maiden win in the series. Corry would get two more podiums at Mid-Ohio and the final race of the season at Portland to finish seventh in the championship.

==== 2024 ====
For 2024, Corry would return to the championship but would switch to Pabst Racing.

=== ARCA Menards Series ===
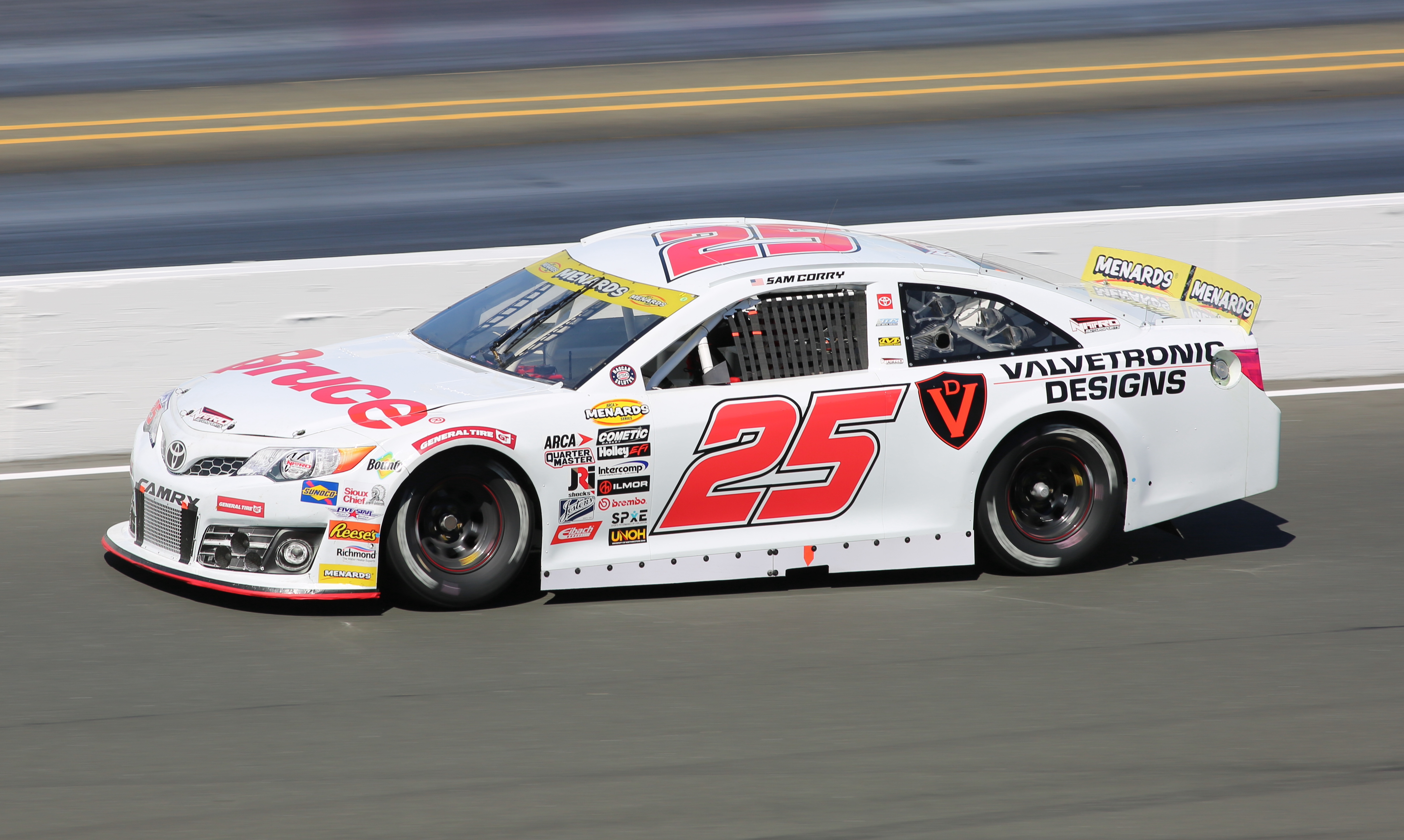
Corry's No. 25 car at Sonoma Raceway in 2026.

In 2025, it was revealed that Corry would make his debut in the ARCA Menards Series at Lucas Oil Indianapolis Raceway Park, driving the No. 70 Toyota for Nitro Motorsports. He started in ninth after qualifying was cancelled due to weather, and finished in 13th. He later ran for Nitro the following race at Iowa Speedway, where he finished in the top-ten in seventh, and at the Illinois State Fairgrounds for Venturini Motorsports, where he in 13th due to being involved in a crash late in the race.

On December 12, 2025, it was announced that Corry would run another partial schedule for Nitro in both the ARCA Menards Series and the ARCA Menards Series West in 2026, beginning at the main series race at Watkins Glen International. He won the West Series race at Sonoma after starting on pole and leading every lap. He started second at Portland.

== Racing record ==
=== Career summary ===
Season	Series	Team	Races	Wins	Poles	F/Laps	Podiums	Points	Position
2022	YACademy Winter Series	Velocity Racing Development	6	0	1	0	2	50	4th
2022	USF Juniors	Velocity Racing Development	16	3	3	2	11	369	**2nd**
2023	USF2000 Championship	Velocity Racing Development	18	1	0	0	3	222	7th
2024	USF2000 Championship	Pabst Racing	18	3	0	2	7	355	**2nd**
2025	ARCA Menards Series	Nitro Motorsports	3	0	0	0	0	99	46th
2025	ARCA Menards Series	Venturini Motorsports	3	0	0	0	0	99	46th
2025	ARCA Menards Series East	Nitro Motorsports	2	0	0	0	0	68	36th
2025	Trans-Am Series - TA2								
2026	ARCA Menards Series	Nitro Motorsports	1	0	1	1	0	39	83rd
2026	ARCA Menards Series West	Nitro Motorsports	5	1	0	0	1	245	13th
2026	ARCA Menards Series West	Spraker Racing Enterprises	1	0	0	0	0	245	13th
2026	Michelin Pilot Challenge - GS	Medusa Motorsports							
2026	Trans-Am Series - TA2								

* Season still in progress.

=== American open-wheel racing results ===
==== USF Juniors ====
(key) (Races in bold indicate pole position) (Races in italics indicate fastest lap) (Races with * indicate most race laps led)

Year	Team	1	2	3	4	5	6	7	8	9	10	11	12	13	14	15	16	17	Rank	Points
2022	Velocity Racing Development	OIR; 1; 3	OIR; 2; 3	OIR; 3 C†	ALA; 1; 2	ALA; 2; 4	VIR; 1; 3*	VIR; 2; 12	VIR; 3; 3	MOH; 1; 1	MOH; 2; 4	MOH; 3; 5	ROA; 1; 1*	**ROA**; **2**; 2	ROA; 3; 2*	**COA**; **1**; 4	COA; 2; 1	COA; 3; 2	2nd	369

† Race was cancelled due to inclement weather.

==== USF2000 Championship ====
(key) (Races in bold indicate pole position) (Races in italics indicate fastest lap) (Races with * indicate most race laps led)

Year	Team	1	2	3	4	5	6	7	8	9	10	11	12	13	14	15	16	17	18	Rank	Points
2023	Velocity Racing Development	STP; 1; 5	STP; 2; 11	SEB; 1; 8	SEB; 2; 19	IMS; 1; 1	IMS; 2; 5	IMS; 3; 16	IRP; 12	ROA; 1; 19	ROA; 2; 20	MOH; 1; 7	MOH; 2; 3	MOH; 3; 5	TOR; 1; 9	TOR; 2; 6	POR; 1; 16	POR; 2; 17	POR; 3; 3	7th	222
2024	Pabst Racing	STP; 1; 3	STP; 2; 2	NOL; 1; 4	NOL; 2; 1*	NOL; 3; 7	IMS; 1; 5	IMS; 2; 9	IRP; 11	ROA; 1; 1*	ROA; 2; 4	MOH; 1; 4	MOH; 2; 8	MOH; 3; 3	TOR; 1; 1*	TOR; 2; 3	POR; 1; 7	POR; 2; 6	POR; 3; 7	2nd	355

=== ARCA Menards Series ===
(key) (Bold – Pole position awarded by qualifying time. Italics – Pole position earned by points standings or practice time. * – Most laps led. ** – All laps led.)

ARCA Menards Series results
Year	Team	No.	Make	1	2	3	4	5	6	7	8	9	10	11	12	13	14	15	16	17	18	19	20	AMSC	Pts	Ref
2025	Nitro Motorsports	70	Toyota	DAY	PHO	TAL	KAN	CLT	MCH	BLN	ELK	LRP	DOV	IRP; 13	IOW; 7	GLN								46th	99	
2025	Venturini Motorsports	25	Toyota														ISF; 13	MAD	DSF	BRI	SLM	KAN	TOL	46th	99	
2026	Nitro Motorsports	15	Toyota	DAY	PHO	KAN	TAL	GLN; 5	TOL	MCH	POC	BER	ELK	CHI	LRP	IRP	IOW	ISF	MAD	DSF	SLM	BRI	KAN	83rd	39	

==== ARCA Menards Series East ====
ARCA Menards Series East results
Year	Team	No.	Make	1	2	3	4	5	6	7	8	AMSEC	Pts	Ref
2025	Nitro Motorsports	70	Toyota	FIF	CAR	NSV	FRS	DOV	IRP; 13	IOW; 7	BRI	36th	68	

==== ARCA Menards Series West ====
ARCA Menards Series West results
Year	Team	No.	Make	1	2	3	4	5	6	7	8	9	10	11	12	13	AMSWC	Pts	Ref
2026	Nitro Motorsports	25	Toyota	KER	PHO	TUC	SHA	CNS	TRI; 11	**SON**; 1**	PIR; 15*	AAS	MAD	LVS; 22		KER; 17	13th	245	
2026	Spraker Racing Enterprises	63	Chevy												PHO; 11		13th	245	
