= Giorgio Carrara =

Argentine racing driver (born 2001)

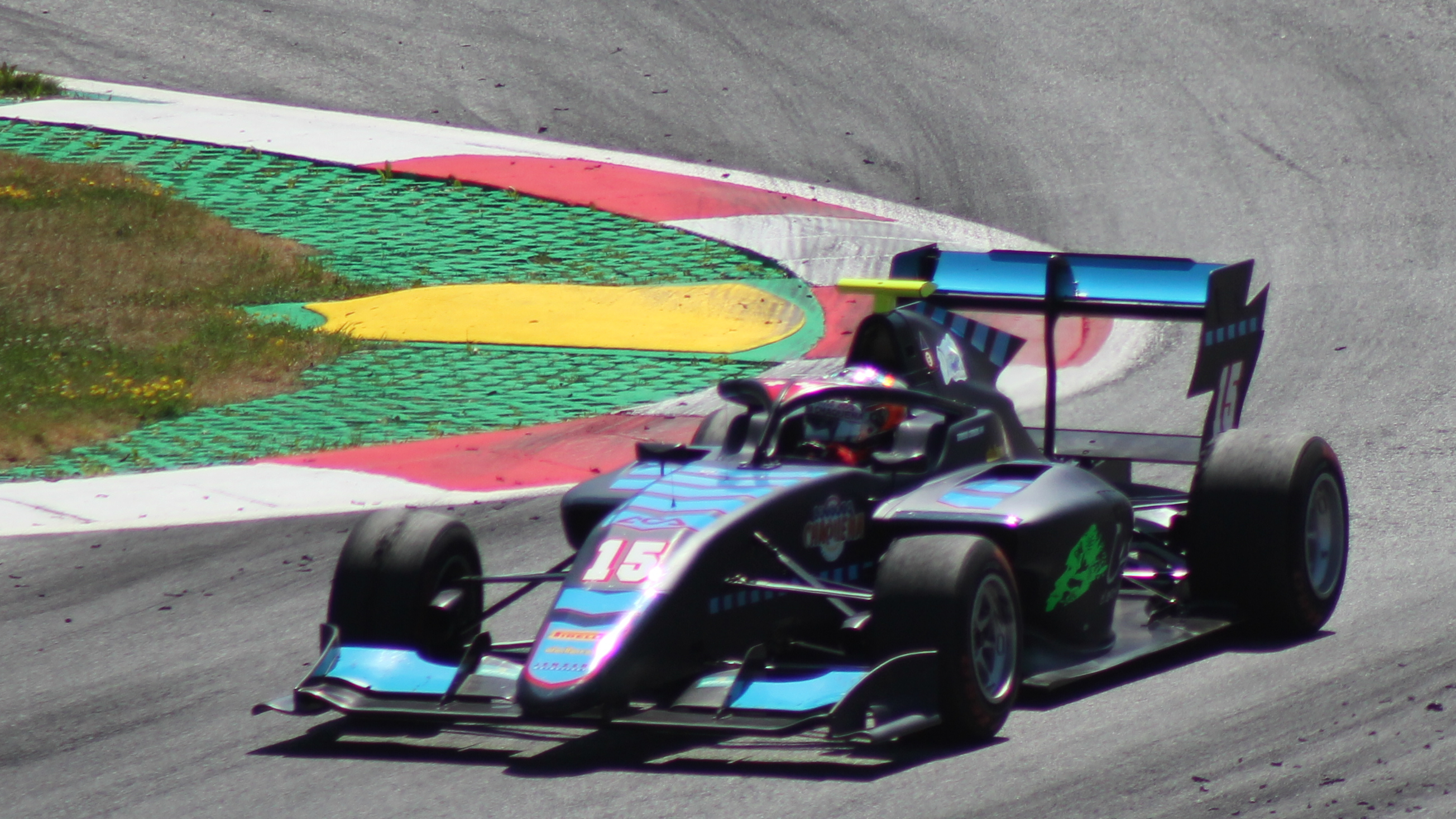
- Carrara in 2019
- Nationality: Argentine
- Born: Giorgio Emiliano Carrara; 16 February 2001 (age 25) Las Breñas, Chaco

FIA Formula 3 Championship career
- Debut season: 2019
- Current team: Jenzer Motorsport
- Car number: 15
- Starts: 8
- Wins: 0
- Poles: 0
- Fastest laps: 0
- Best finish: 30th in 2019

Giorgio Emiliano Carrara (born 16 February 2001) is an Argentine racing driver who last competed in the 2022 USF Juniors season. He has previously competed in the FIA Formula 3 Championship.

== Career ==
=== Karting ===
Carrara started karting in 2007 in Argentina at the age of six, winning the ACHAKA championship in the Escuela category. His biggest achievement was winning the Argentine Championship in 2015.

=== Formula 4 ===
In 2017, Carrara moved over to race in Europe for the first time when he made his single-seater debut in the Italian F4 Championship with Jenzer Motorsport. He finished 14th by finishing in the points three times, scoring a total of six points, and was third in the rookie standings.

In 2018, Carrara remained in Italian F4, still with Jenzer. He saw strong improvement in his results – he finished on the podium three times and scored 112 points in total, which earnt him seventh in the championship. He also joined Jenzer for a guest appearance in ADAC Formula 4 at the German Grand Prix, with a best result of 15th.

Carrara once again signed with Jenzer for the 2019 season, alongside Jonny Edgar. Carrara won his first Italian F4 race at the Red Bull Ring, having started second on the grid. He finished thirteenth in the standings with 37 points. He also joined Jenzer for one round in Spanish F4, where he won all three races during the weekend. Carrara finished in 11th place with 55 points. He also made a guest appearance in ADAC Formula 4 in rounds two and three, with a best finish of fifth.

=== FIA Formula 3 ===
After his performance in the Spanish and Italian F4 championships in 2019, Jenzer gave Carrara a drive for them in FIA Formula 3 as a replacement for Artem Petrov. Due to visa complications, Carrara was unable to attend the French Grand Prix, but was able to race at the next race in Austria. He qualified in 20th, ahead of teammates Yuki Tsunoda and Andreas Estner, but suffered from a flat tyre in the feature race and finished a lap down in 28th place, which he improved to 21st in the sprint race. More visa complications meant that Italian Federico Malvestiti replaced Carrara for the British Grand Prix at Silverstone. Carrara would go on to compete in the remained of the season apart from the finale at Sochi Autodrom. He finished 30th in the standings with a best result of 16th.

A lack of funds meant that Carrara was unable to secure a full-time seat with Jenzer for 2020, although he remained part of the team as a simulator driver.

=== USF Juniors ===
After a two-year break from racing, Carrara moved to the United States, competing in one round of the Formula 4 United States Championship for International Motorsport. He finished fourth in the third race, scoring twelve points, with which he finished 20th in the standings. He then switched to USF Juniors with the same team, and finished in the top-five four times, scoring 122 points on his way to 13th in the standings.

Carrara did not secure a racing seat for 2023, but he did compete in a guest race of the IAME Series Argentina karting championship in 2024.

== Racing record ==
=== Career summary ===
Season	Series	Team	Races	Wins	Poles	F/Laps	Podiums	Points	Position
2017	Italian F4 Championship	Jenzer Motorsport	21	0	0	0	0	6	14th
2018	ADAC Formula 4 Championship	Jenzer Motorsport	2	0	0	0	0	0	NC†
2018	Italian F4 Championship	Jenzer Motorsport	21	0	0	0	3	112	7th
2019	F4 Spanish Championship	Jenzer Motorsport	3	3	1	1	3	55	11th
2019	Italian F4 Championship	Jenzer Motorsport	11	1	0	1	1	37	13th
2019	ADAC Formula 4 Championship	Jenzer Motorsport	5	0	0	0	0	0	NC†
2019	FIA Formula 3 Championship	Jenzer Motorsport	8	0	0	0	0	0	30th
2022	Formula 4 United States Championship	International Motorsport	3	0	0	0	0	12	20th
2022	USF Juniors	International Motorsport	9	0	0	0	0	122	13th

† As Carrara was a guest driver, he was ineligible to score points.

=== Complete Italian F4 Championship results ===
(key) (Races in bold indicate pole position) (Races in italics indicate fastest lap)

Year	Team	1	2	3	4	5	6	7	8	9	10	11	12	13	14	15	16	17	18	19	20	21	Pos	Points
2017	Jenzer Motorsport	MIS; 1; 16	MIS; 2; 20	MIS; 3; 21	ADR; 1; 9	ADR; 2; 12	ADR; 3; 13	VAL; 1; 15	VAL; 2; 15	VAL; 3; 17	MUG1; 1; 15	MUG1; 2; 12	MUG1; 3 Ret	IMO; 1; 11	IMO; 2; 11	IMO; 3; 11	MUG2; 1; 15	MUG2; 2; 12	MUG2; 3; 9	MNZ; 1 Ret	MNZ; 2; 9	MNZ; 3 Ret	14th	6
2018	Jenzer Motorsport	ADR; 1; 11	ADR; 2; 9	ADR; 3; 6	LEC; 1; 9	LEC; 2; 3	LEC; 3; 9	MNZ; 1; 3	MNZ; 2; 22	MNZ; 3; 10	MIS; 1; 7	MIS; 2 Ret	MIS; 3; 4	IMO; 1; 3	IMO; 2; 10	IMO; 3; 10	VLL; 1; 7	VLL; 2; 10	VLL; 3; 13	MUG; 1; 5	MUG; 2; 5	MUG; 3; 7	7th	112
2019	Jenzer Motorsport	VLL; 1; 11	VLL; 2; 15	VLL; 3; 8	MIS; 1; 15	MIS; 2; 19	MIS; 3 C	HUN; 1; 8	HUN; 2; 15	HUN; 3; 11	RBR; 1; 19	RBR; 2; 8	RBR; 3; 1	IMO; 1	IMO; 2	IMO; 3	MUG; 1	MUG; 2	MUG; 3	MNZ; 1	MNZ; 2	MNZ; 3	13th	37

=== Complete ADAC Formula 4 Championship results ===
(key) (Races in bold indicate pole position) (Races in italics indicate fastest lap)

Year	Team	1	2	3	4	5	6	7	8	9	10	11	12	13	14	15	16	17	18	19	20	Pos	Points
2018	Jenzer Motorsport	OSC; 1	OSC; 2	OSC; 3	HOC1; 1	HOC1; 2	HOC1; 3	LAU; 1	LAU; 2	LAU; 3	RBR; 1	RBR; 2	RBR; 3	HOC2; 1; 15	HOC2; 2; 23†	NÜR; 1	NÜR; 2	NÜR; 3	HOC3; 1	HOC3; 2	HOC3; 3	NC	0
2019	Jenzer Motorsport	OSC; 1	OSC; 2	OSC; 3	RBR; 1; 22	RBR; 2; 7	RBR; 3 Ret	HOC1; 1; 5	HOC1; 2; 8	ZAN; 1	ZAN; 2	ZAN; 3	NÜR; 1	NÜR; 2	NÜR; 3	HOC2; 1	HOC2; 2	HOC2; 3	SAC; 1	SAC; 2	SAC; 3	NC	0

=== Complete F4 Spanish Championship results ===
(key) (Races in bold indicate pole position) (Races in italics indicate fastest lap)

Year	Team	1	2	3	4	5	6	7	8	9	10	11	12	13	14	15	16	17	18	19	20	21	Pos	Points
2019	Jenzer Motorsport	NAV; 1	NAV; 2	NAV; 3	LEC; 1; 1	LEC; 2; 1	LEC; 3; 1	ARA; 1	ARA; 2	ARA; 3	CRT; 1	CRT; 2	CRT; 3	JER; 1	JER; 2	JER; 3	ALG; 1	ALG; 2	ALG; 3	CAT; 1	CAT; 2	CAT; 3	11th	55

=== Complete FIA Formula 3 Championship results ===
(key) (Races in bold indicate pole position; races in italics indicate points for the fastest lap of top ten finishers)

Year	Entrant	1	2	3	4	5	6	7	8	9	10	11	12	13	14	15	16	DC	Points
2019	Jenzer Motorsport	CAT; FEA	CAT; SPR	LEC; FEA	LEC; SPR	RBR; FEA; 28	RBR; SPR; 21	SIL; FEA	SIL; SPR	HUN; FEA; 25	HUN; SPR; 21	SPA; FEA; 16	SPA; SPR; Ret	MNZ; FEA; Ret	MNZ; SPR; 23	SOC; FEA	SOC; FEA	30th	0

=== Complete Formula 4 United States Championship results ===
(key) (Races in bold indicate pole position) (Races in italics indicate fastest lap)

Year	Team	1	2	3	4	5	6	7	8	9	10	11	12	13	14	15	16	17	18	Pos	Points
2022	International Motorsport	NOL; 1	NOL; 2	NOL; 3	ROA; 1	ROA; 2	ROA; 3	MOH; 1; 12	MOH; 2; 12	MOH; 3; 4	NJM; 1	NJM; 2	NJM; 3	VIR; 1	VIR; 2	VIR; 3	COA; 1	COA; 2	COA; 3	20th	12

=== American open-wheel racing results ===
==== USF Juniors ====
(key) (Races in bold indicate pole position) (Races in italics indicate fastest lap)

Year	Team	1	2	3	4	5	6	7	8	9	10	11	12	13	14	15	16	17	Pos	Points
2022	International Motorsport	OIR; 1	OIR; 2	OIR; 3	ALA; 1	ALA; 2	VIR; 1	VIR; 2	VIR; 3	MOH; 1; 5	MOH; 2; 5	MOH; 3; 4	ROA; 1; 8	ROA; 2; 9	ROA; 3; 5	COA; 1; 11	COA; 2; 15	COA; 3; 10	13th	122
