= Bianca Bustamante =

Filipina racing driver (born 2005)

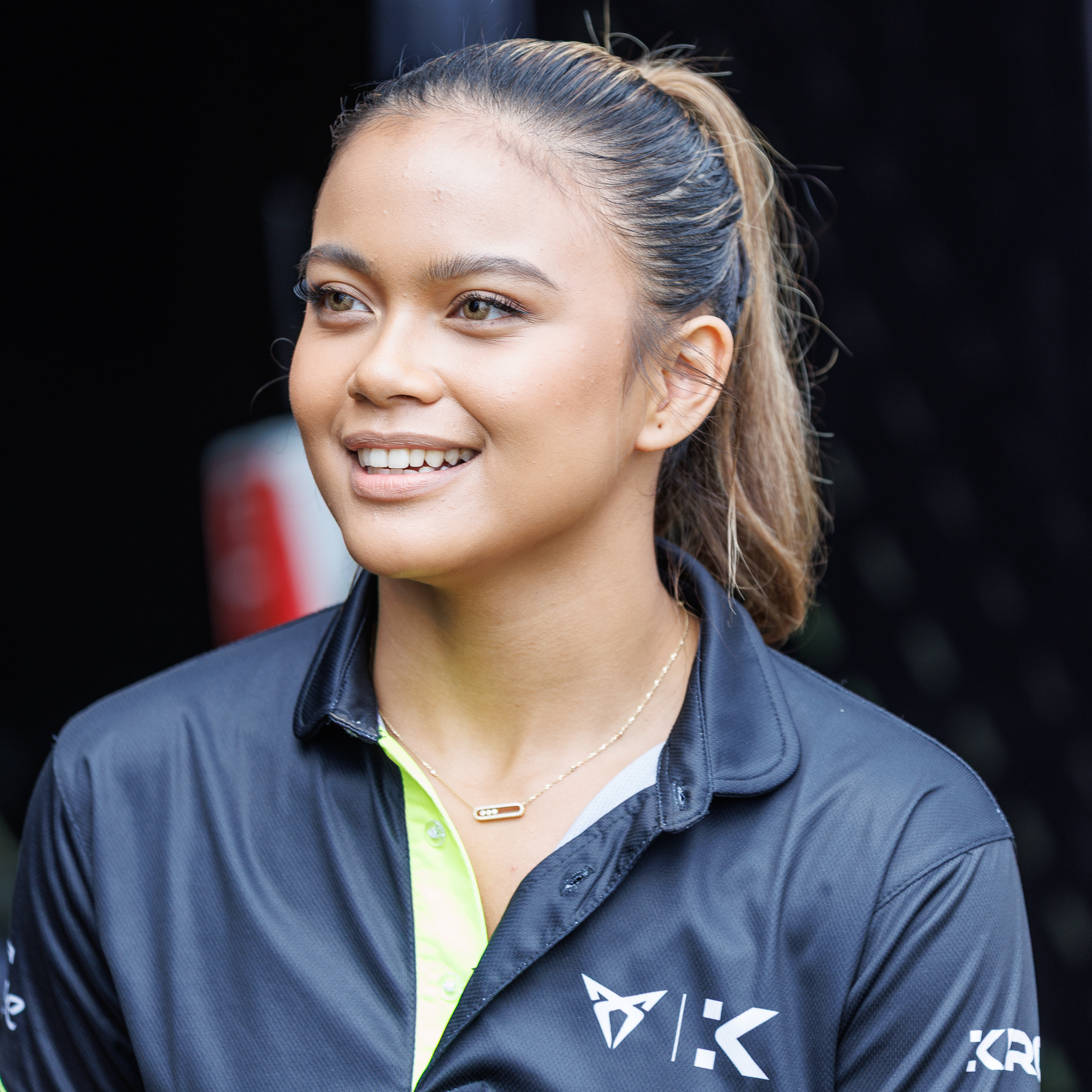
- Bustamante at the 2025 Berlin ePrix
- Nationality: (Philippines) Filipina
- Born: Bianca Denise Bustamante; January 19, 2005 (age 21) Manila, Philippines

Eurocup-3 career
- Debut season: 2026
- Current team: Palou Motorsport
- Car number: 16
- Starts: 17
- Wins: 0
- Podiums: 0
- Poles: 0
- Fastest laps: 0
- Best finish: 31st in 2026

Previous series
- 2026; 2025; 2024; 2024; 2023–2024; 2023-2024; 2024; 2023; 2022; 2022-2023; 2022: Eurocup-3 Spanish Winter; GB3; F4 British; Euro 4; F1 Academy; Italian F4; Formula Winter Series; F4 UAE; Indian Racing League; USF Juniors; W Series

Bianca Denise Bustamante (born January 19, 2005) is a Filipina racing driver who last competed in Eurocup-3 for Palou Motorsport.

Bustamante has previously competed in GB3 Championship, F1 Academy and W Series. She has also participated in Formula E test sessions for McLaren and Cupra Kiro.

== Junior career ==
=== W Series ===
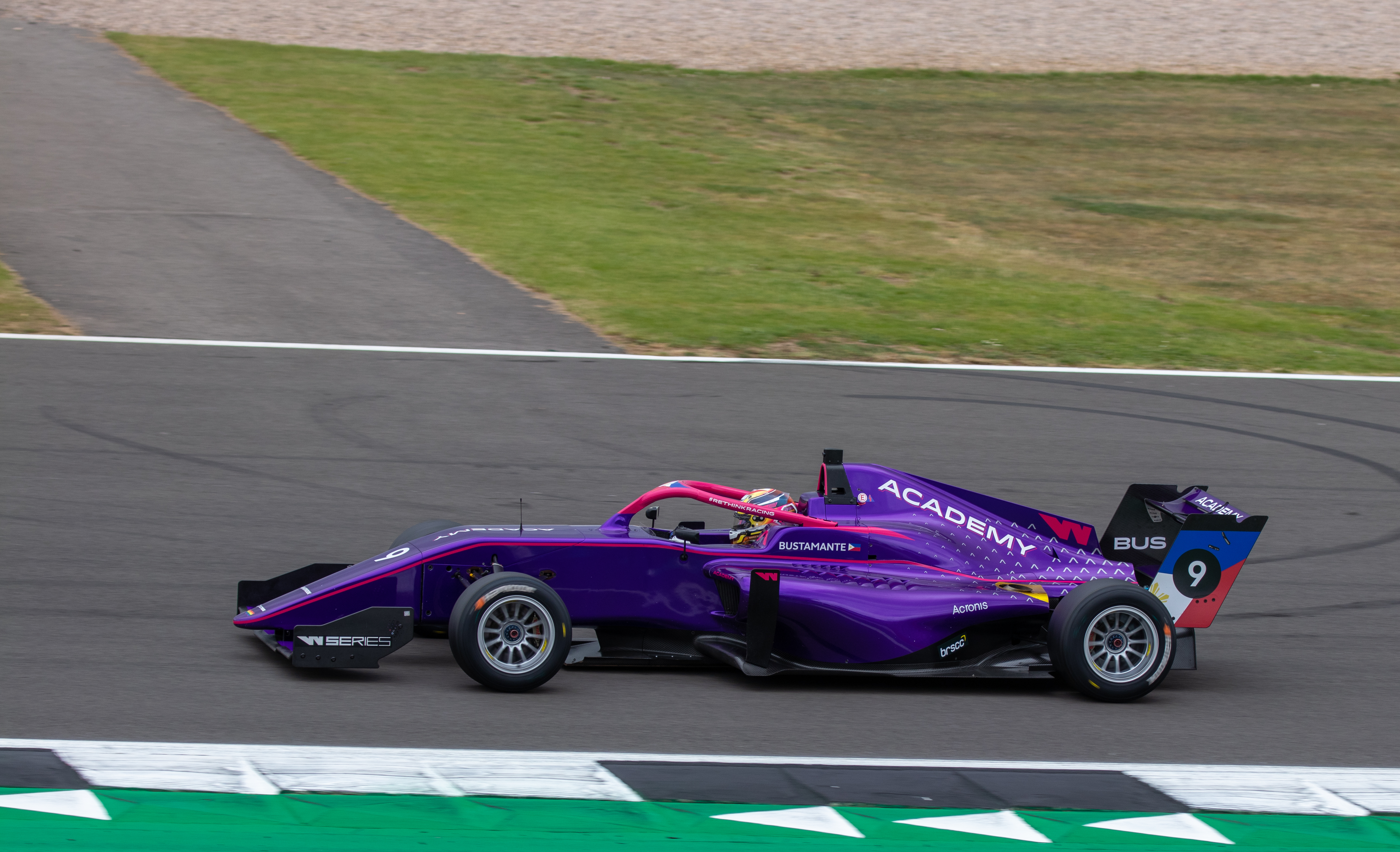
Bustamante competing in the 2022 W Series Silverstone round.

From January 31 to February 4, 2022, Bustamante competed in a W Series test in Arizona, United States, along with 14 other prospective drivers. She then participated in a second pre-season test in Barcelona on March 2–4 along with 11 other potential drivers and nine automatic qualifiers from the previous W Series season. On March 22, Bustamante was confirmed to compete in the 2022 W Series season. She finished the season in 15th place scoring two points across seven races.

=== Formula 4 UAE Championship ===
On January 9, 2023, Bustamante was announced to race under Italian team Prema Powerteam for the 2023 Formula 4 UAE Championship. She finished the season in 27th place scoring three points across fifteen races.

=== F1 Academy ===
==== 2023 season ====
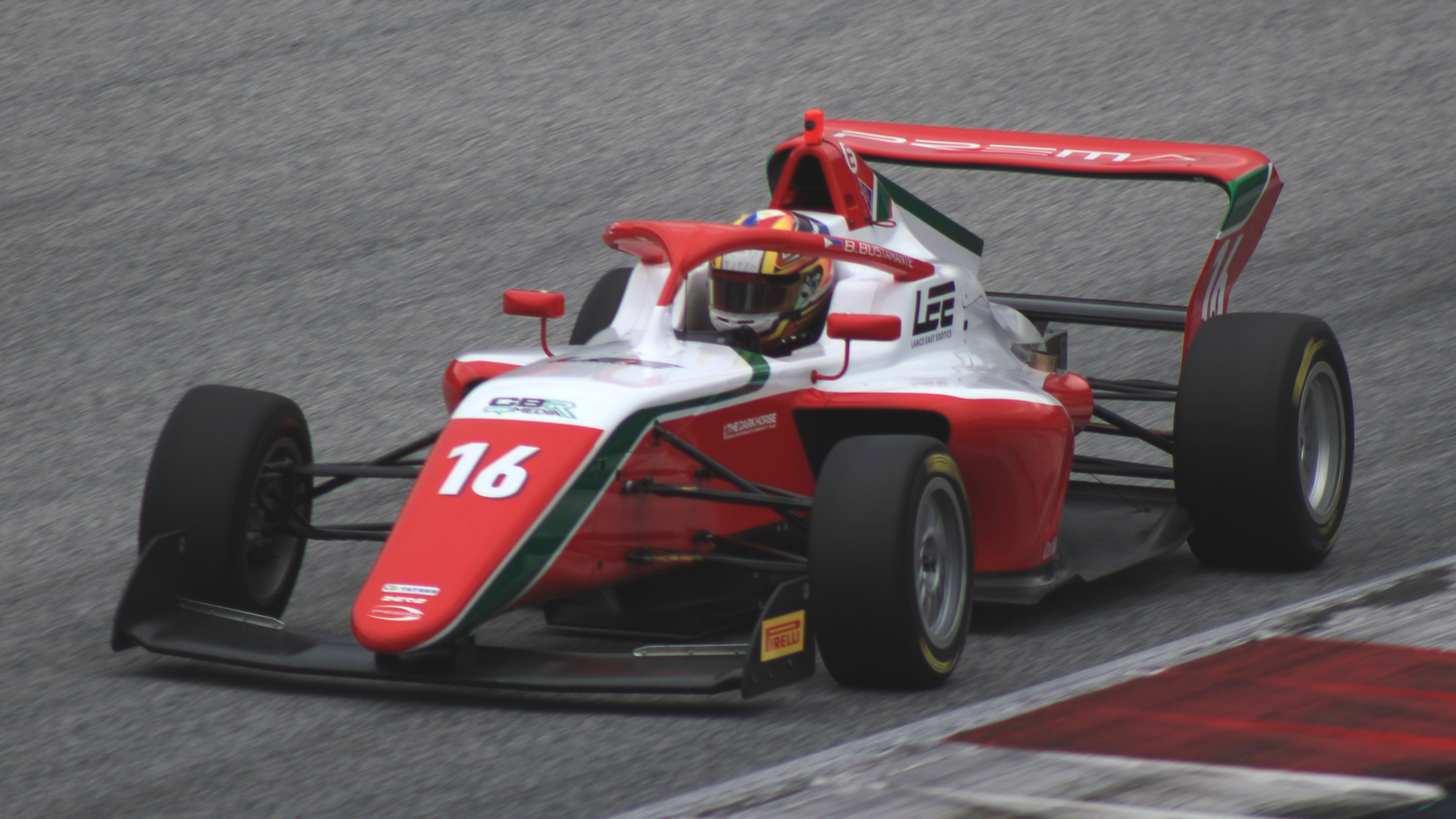
Bustamante competing for Prema in an F1 Academy race at the Red Bull Ring in 2023.

On February 3, 2023, Bustamante was confirmed as the second driver to compete in the newly launched all-female F1 Academy series with Prema Racing (formerly known as Prema Powerteam).

Bustamante finished third in the series' first race at the Red Bull Ring, but was promoted to second following the disqualification of Nerea Martí. Having finished ninth in the second race, her car suffered a technical failure on the formation lap for the third race and did not start.

Bustamante initially qualified second for the second round at Circuit Ricardo Tormo, but was demoted to eighth for a track limits infringement. Having recovered to fifth in the first race, Bustamante then won her first race in the reverse-grid second heat – earning personal congratulations from President of the Philippines Bongbong Marcos.

Bustamante did not finish the first race of the weekend at Monza, before grabbing her third podium of the season in the following reverse-grid race and winning the third and final race of the weekend.

Bustamante scored a total of 116 points, finishing seventh in the championship standings; one point behind MP Motorsport's Amna Al Qubaisi.

==== 2024 season ====
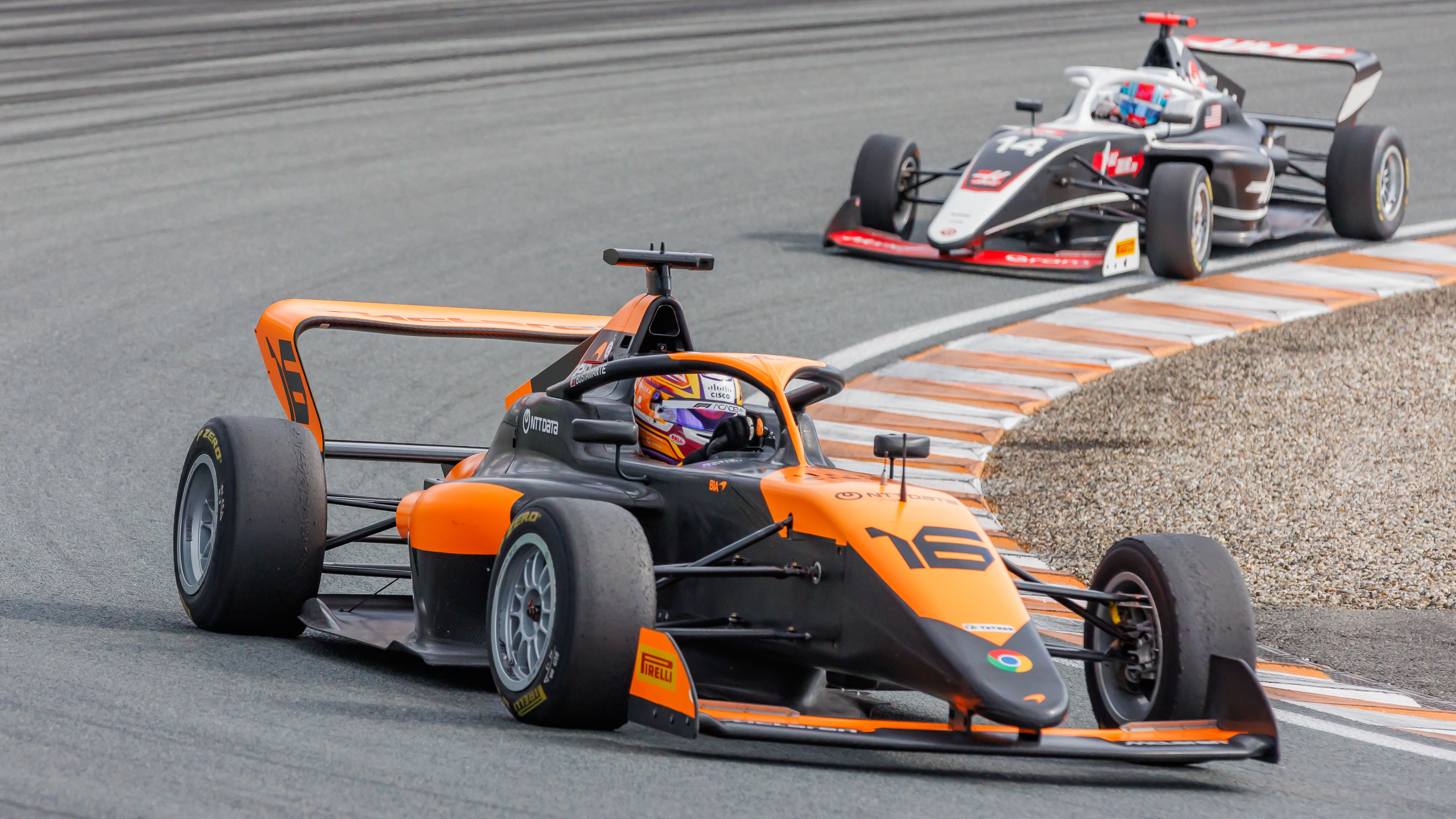
Bustamante leads Chloe Chambers in an F1 Academy race at Zandvoort in 2024.

On October 18, 2023, McLaren announced the signing of Bustamante to the McLaren Driver Development Programme, representing McLaren for the 2024 season under ART Grand Prix. Bustamante was the first female driver signed to the McLaren Driver Development Programme.

In Round 1 at Jeddah, Bustamante finished fifth in Race 1 and was promoted to sixth (from eighth) in Race 2 due to penalties for other competitors. Bustamante qualified in fourth for the second round at Miami and finished the first race in ninth after stalling at the start, but set the fastest lap in consolation; in Race 2, she scored her first podium of the season with a second-place finish. In Round 4 at Zandvoort, Bustamante crashed during qualifying and finished outside the points in both races – a pointless streak which continued in Singapore after she received a stop/go penalty in Race 1 for being out of position on the grid, before colliding with Tina Hausmann in Race 2 whilst recovering from a spin.

Bustamante finished the season in seventh in the driver's championship and left the McLaren Driver Development Programme at the conclusion of her F1 Academy campaign.

=== Italian F4 Championship ===
On May 24, 2023, it was announced that Bustamante would make her Italian F4 debut in the 2023 season at Circuit de Spa-Francorchamps, driving for Prema Racing in a one-off appearance replacing Aurelia Nobels. Bustamante returned in the 2024 season for the final round in Monza, driving for ART Grand Prix.

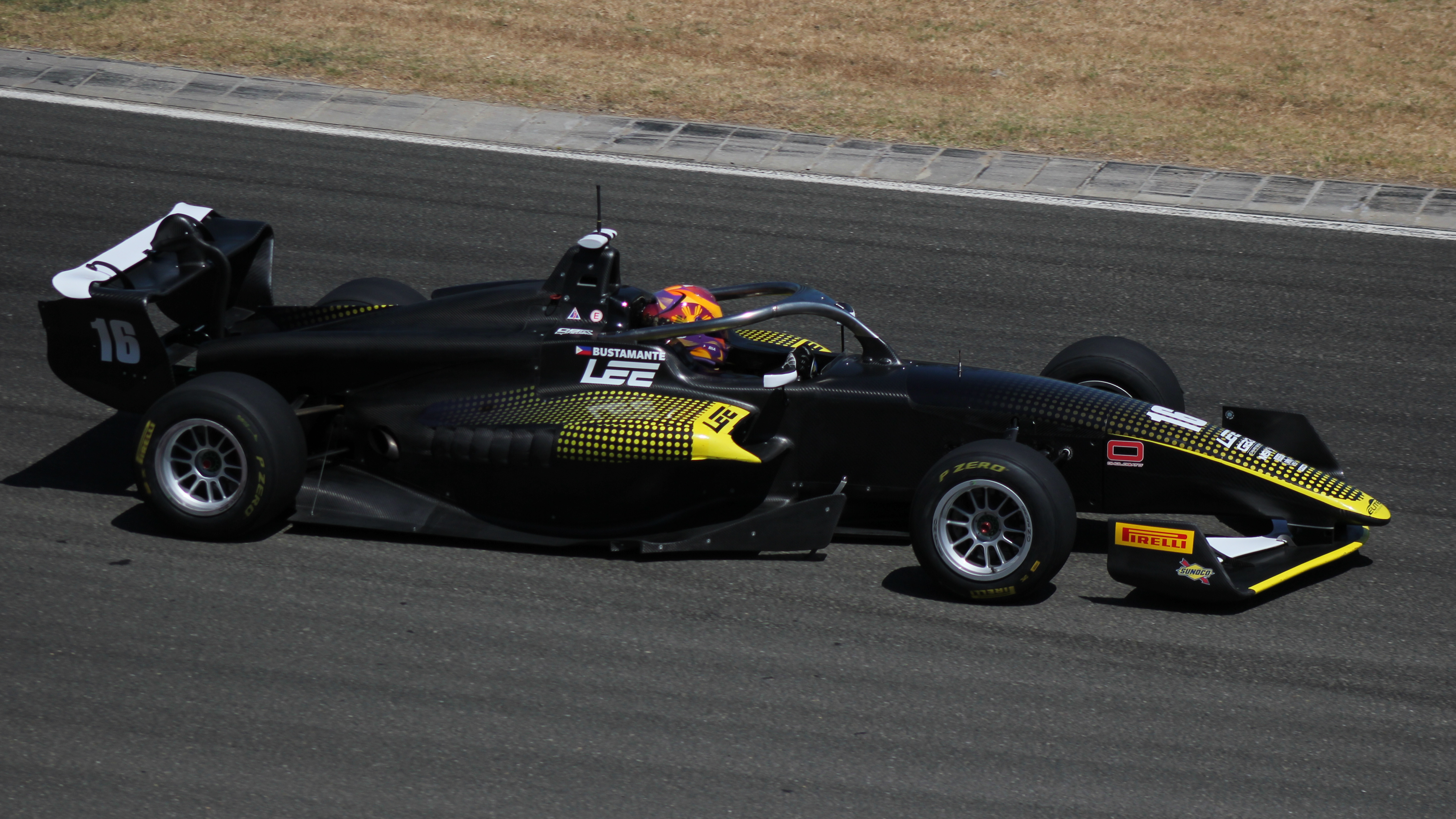
Bustamante driving at the Hungaroring in 2025

=== GB3 Championship ===
On December 19, 2024, it was announced that Bustamante will join GB3 Championship in the 2025 season with Elite Motorsport. She finished the season in 22nd position in the drivers' championship.

=== Eurocup-3 ===
In January 2026, it was announced that Bustamante would compete in the 2026 season of Eurocup-3 with Palou Motorsport.

== Formula E ==
On October 15, 2024, McLaren announced Bustamante and her F1 Academy successor Ella Lloyd as the line-up for the McLaren Formula E Team women's pre-season test for the 2024–25 season in Formula E. She placed in third in the test. From June to August 2025, Bustamante was signed by Cupra Kiro as a development driver. She participated in the 2024–25 season rookie test for the team, finishing in 19th and 22nd in the morning and afternoon sessions, respectively, being more than 1.5 seconds behind the leaders. She was again announced as Cupra Kiro's driver for the 2025–26 season pre-season women's test, where she finished in sixth and third in the morning and afternoon sessions, respectively. Bustamante returned with the team during the rookie test at the 2026 Madrid ePrix, finishing 16th in the morning session and 17th in the afternoon session.

== Personal life ==
Born in Manila, Bustamante resides between Laguna, Philippines, and San Jose, California. Former GT racer Darryl O'Young acts as Bustamante's manager.

In December 2023, Bustamante received backlash on social media after it emerged that she had liked several tweets critical of Formula One driver Lance Stroll, one of which used ableist language.

In March 2024, vehicle rental company Avis ranked Bustamante the third-most influential non-European female racing driver; at the time, she had a combined 2.2 million followers across Instagram and TikTok.

== Karting record ==
=== Karting career summary ===
Season	Series	Team	Position
2015	SKUSA SuperNationals XIX - TaG Cadet	Cambrian Go-Karts	21st
2015	Challenge of the Americas - PSL West Mini Max		9th
2016	SKUSA SuperNationals XX - X30 Junior	Cambrian Go-Karts	43rd
2019	Asian Karting Open Championship - X30 Junior		2nd
2019	IAME Series Asia - Junior	AutoInc Racing	4th
2020	IAME Asia Cup - X30 Senior	AutoInc Racing	16th

=== Complete Macao International Kart Grand Prix results ===
Year	Series	Team	Class	Pre-Final	Final
2013	Asian Karting Open Championship	Formula E Racing Team	Mini ROK	3rd	3rd
2013	Asian Karting Open Championship	Formula E Racing Team	SQ Formula Cadet	7th	2nd
2015	Asian Karting Open Championship	Formula E Racing Team	Formula 125 Junior Open	?	?
2016	Asian Karting Open Championship	Empire Racing Team	Formula 125 Junior Open	?	3rd
2017	Asian Karting Open Championship	Formula E Racing Team	Formula 125 Junior Open	3rd	3rd
2018	Asian Karting Open Championship	D' Paddock Motorsport	Formula 125 Junior Open	?	6th
2019	Asian Karting Open Championship	Autoinc Racing Team	Formula 125 Junior Open	9th	8th

== Racing record ==
=== Racing career summary ===
Season	Series	Team	Races	Wins	Poles	F/Laps	Podiums	Points	Position
2022	USF Juniors	IGY6 Motorsports	4	0	0	0	0	32	25th
2022	W Series	W Series Academy	7	0	0	0	0	2	15th
2022	Indian Racing League	Bangalore Speedsters	5	0	0	0	0	46	17th
2023	Formula 4 UAE Championship	Prema Racing	15	0	0	0	0	3	27th
2023	F1 Academy	Prema Racing	21	2	0	0	4	116	7th
2023	Italian F4 Championship	Prema Racing	3	0	0	0	0	0	44th
2023	USF Juniors	Exclusive Autosport	3	0	0	0	0	27	17th
2023	Macau Formula 4 Race	BlackArts Racing	2	0	0	0	0	N/A	DNF
2024	F1 Academy	ART Grand Prix	14	0	0	1	1	73	7th
2024	Italian F4 Championship	ART Grand Prix	3	0	0	0	0	0	52nd
2024	Euro 4 Championship	ART Grand Prix	3	0	0	0	0	0	34th
2024	Formula Winter Series	GRS Team	8	0	0	0	0	0	40th
2024	F4 British Championship	Hitech Pulse-Eight	3	0	0	0	0	6	29th
2024–25	Formula E	Cupra Kiro	Development driver						
2025	GB3 Championship	Elite Motorsport	24	0	0	0	0	75	22nd
2025–26	Formula E	Cupra Kiro	Development driver						
2026	Eurocup-3 Spanish Winter Championship	Palou Motorsport	9	0	0	0	0	0	26th
2026	Eurocup-3	Palou Motorsport	17	0	0	0	0	0	31st

^{†} As Bustamante was a guest driver, she was ineligible for points.
* Season still in progress.

=== American open-wheel racing results ===
==== USF Juniors ====
(key) (Races in bold indicate pole position) (Races in italics indicate fastest lap)

Year	Team	1	2	3	4	5	6	7	8	9	10	11	12	13	14	15	16	17	DC	Points
2022	IGY6 Motorsports	OIR; 1; 14	OIR; 2; 10	OIR; 3 C	ALA; 1; 15	ALA; 2; 12	VIR; 1	VIR; 2	VIR; 3	MOH; 1	MOH; 2	MOH; 3	ROA; 1	ROA; 2	ROA; 3	COA; 1	COA; 2	COA; 3	25th	32
2023	Exclusive Autosport	SEB; 1	SEB; 2	SEB; 3	ALA; 1	ALA; 2	VIR; 1	VIR; 2	VIR; 3	MOH; 1	MOH; 2	ROA; 1	ROA; 2	ROA; 3	COA; 1; 9	COA; 2; 18	COA; 3; 9		17th	27

=== Complete W Series results ===
(key) (Races in bold indicate pole position) (Races in italics indicate fastest lap)

Year	Team	1	2	3	4	5	6	7	DC	Points
2022	W Series Academy	MIA1; 9	MIA2; 14	CAT; 15	SIL; 17	LEC; 15	HUN; Ret	SIN; 15	15th	2

=== Complete Indian Racing League results ===
(key) (Races in bold indicate pole position) (Races in italics indicate fastest lap)

Year	Franchise	1	2	3	4	5	6	7	8	9	10	11	12	Pos.	Pts
2022	Bangalore Speedsters	HYD1; 1 C	HYD1; 2 C	HYD1; 3 C	IRU1; 1	IRU1; 2; 5	IRU1; 3; 6	IRU2; 1	IRU2; 2; 8	IRU2; 3; 6	HYD2; 1	HYD2; 2 DNS	HYD2; 3 Ret	17th	46

=== Complete Formula 4 UAE Championship results ===
(key) (Races in bold indicate pole position) (Races in italics indicate fastest lap)

Year	Team	1	2	3	4	5	6	7	8	9	10	11	12	13	14	15	Pos	Points
2023	Prema Racing	DUB1; 1; 26	DUB1; 2; 28	DUB1; 3 Ret	KMT1; 1; 20	KMT1; 2; 25	KMT1; 3 Ret	KMT2; 1; 33	KMT2; 2; 10	KMT2; 3; 15	DUB2; 1; 17	DUB2; 2; 9	DUB2; 3; 21	YMC; 1 Ret	YMC; 2; 30	YMC; 3 Ret	27th	3

=== Complete F1 Academy results ===
(key) (Races in bold indicate pole position; races in italics indicate fastest lap)

Year	Team	1	2	3	4	5	6	7	8	9	10	11	12	13	14	15	16	17	18	19	20	21	DC	Points
2023	Prema Racing	RBR; 1; 2	RBR; 2; 9	RBR; 3 NC	CRT; 1; 5	CRT; 2; 1	CRT; 3; 7	CAT; 1; 4	CAT; 2; 14†	CAT; 3; 10	ZAN; 1; 10	ZAN; 2; 8	ZAN; 3; 5	MNZ; 1 Ret	MNZ; 2; 2	MNZ; 3; 1	LEC; 1; 13	LEC; 2; 10	LEC; 3; 14	COA; 1; 4	COA; 2; 7	COA; 3; 13	7th	116
2024	ART Grand Prix	JED; 1; 5	JED; 2; 6	MIA; 1; 9	MIA; 2; 2	CAT; 1; 4	CAT; 2; 7	ZAN; 1; 14	ZAN; 2; 11	SIN; 1; 16	SIN; 2; 14	LSL; 1; 16	LSL; 2 C	YMC; 1; 5	YMC; 2; 7	YMC; 3; 14							7th	73

=== Complete Italian F4 Championship results ===
(key) (Races in bold indicate pole position) (Races in italics indicate fastest lap)

Year	Team	1	2	3	4	5	6	7	8	9	10	11	12	13	14	15	16	17	18	19	20	21	22	DC	Points
2023	Prema Racing	IMO; 1	IMO; 2	IMO; 3	IMO; 4	MIS; 1	MIS; 2	MIS; 3	SPA; 1; 25	SPA; 2; 19	SPA; 3; 19	MNZ; 1	MNZ; 2	MNZ; 3	LEC; 1	LEC; 2	LEC; 3	MUG; 1	MUG; 2	MUG; 3	VLL; 1	VLL; 2	VLL; 3	44th	0
2024	ART Grand Prix	MIS; 1	MIS; 2	MIS; 3	IMO; 1	IMO; 2	IMO; 3	VLL; 1	VLL; 2	VLL; 3	MUG; 1	MUG; 2	MUG; 3	LEC; 1	LEC; 2	LEC; 3	CAT; 1	CAT; 2	CAT; 3	MNZ; 1; 33	MNZ; 2 Ret	MNZ; 3 Ret		52nd	0

=== Complete Formula 4 South East Asia Championship results ===
(key) (Races in bold indicate pole position; races in italics indicate fastest lap)

Year	Entrant	1	2	3	4	5	6	7	8	9	10	11	Pos	Points
2023	BlackArts Racing	ZZIC1; 1	ZZIC1; 2	ZZIC1; 3	MAC; 1; 9	MAC; 2 Ret	SEP1; 1	SEP1; 2	SEP1; 3	SEP2; 1	SEP2; 2	SEP2; 3	NC†	0

=== Complete Formula Winter Series results ===
(key) (Races in bold indicate pole position; races in italics indicate fastest lap)

Year	Team	1	2	3	4	5	6	7	8	9	10	11	12	DC	Points
2024	GRS Team	JER; 1; 35	JER; 2; 26	JER; 3; 30	CRT; 1; 33	CRT; 2 Ret	CRT; 3 WD	ARA; 1; 35	ARA; 2; 29	ARA; 3; 17	CAT; 1	CAT; 2	CAT; 3	40th	0

=== Complete F4 British Championship results ===
(key) (Races in bold indicate pole position; races in italics indicate fastest lap)

Year	Team	1	2	3	4	5	6	7	8	9	10	11	12	13	14	15	16	17	18	19	20	21	22	23	24	25	26	27	28	29	30	31	32	DC	Points
2024	Hitech Pulse-Eight	DPN; 1	DPN; 2	DPN; 3	BHI; 1	BHI; 2	BHI; 3	SNE; 1	SNE; 2	SNE; 3	THR; 1	THR; 2	THR; 3	SILGP; 1	SILGP; 2	SILGP; 3	ZAN; 1; 18	ZAN; 2; 17	ZAN; 3; 8	KNO; 1	KNO; 2	KNO; 3	DPGP; 1	DPGP; 2	DPGP; 3	DPGP; 4	SILN; 1	SILN; 2	SILN; 3	BHGP; 1	BHGP; 2	BHGP; 3	BHGP; 4	29th	6

=== Complete Euro 4 Championship results ===
(key) (Races in bold indicate pole position; races in italics indicate fastest lap)

Year	Team	1	2	3	4	5	6	7	8	9	DC	Points
2024	ART Grand Prix	MUG; 1	MUG; 2	MUG; 3	RBR; 1	RBR; 2	RBR; 3	MNZ; 1; 18	MNZ; 2; 24	MNZ; 3; 28	34th	0

=== Complete GB3 Championship results ===
(key) (Races in bold indicate pole position) (Races in italics indicate fastest lap)

Year	Team	1	2	3	4	5	6	7	8	9	10	11	12	13	14	15	16	17	18	19	20	21	22	23	24	DC	Points
2025	Elite Motorsport	SIL1; 1 DNS	SIL1; 2; 20	SIL1; 3; 19^{2}	ZAN; 1; 17	ZAN; 2; 19	ZAN; 3; 13^{3}	SPA; 1; 20	SPA; 2; 20	SPA; 3 Ret	HUN; 1; 14	HUN; 2; 13	HUN; 3; 13^{2}	SIL2; 1; 15	SIL2; 2; 17	SIL2; 3; 18^{2}	BRH; 1 Ret	BRH; 2; 19	BRH; 3; 19^{2}	DON; 1; 18	DON; 2; 18	DON; 3; 14^{3}	MNZ; 1; 17	MNZ; 2; 14	MNZ; 3; 22	22nd	75

=== Complete Eurocup-3 Spanish Winter Championship results ===
(key) (Races in bold indicate pole position) (Races in italics indicate fastest lap)

Year	Team	1	2	3	4	5	6	7	8	9	DC	Points
2026	Palou Motorsport	POR; 1; 24	POR; SPR; 13	POR; 2; 21	JAR; 1; 18	JAR; SPR; Ret	JAR; 2; 15	ARA; 1; 20	ARA; SPR; Ret	ARA; 2; 18	26th	0

=== Complete Eurocup-3 results ===
(key) (Races in bold indicate pole position; races in italics indicate fastest lap)

Year	Team	1	2	3	4	5	6	7	8	9	10	11	12	13	14	15	16	17	18	19	DC	Points
2026	Palou Motorsport	LEC; 1 Ret	LEC; SR; 18	LEC; 2; 21	POR; 1; 14	POR; 2; 18	IMO; 1; 15	IMO; SR; 16	IMO; 2; 19	MNZ; 1; 25	MNZ; 2 DNS	SIL; 1; 25	SIL; 2; 24	JER; 1 Ret	JER; SR; DNS	JER; 2; 22	HUN; 1 Ret	HUN; 2; 17	CAT; 1; 20	CAT; 2 Ret	31st	0
