= Elliot Cox =

American racing driver (born 2007)

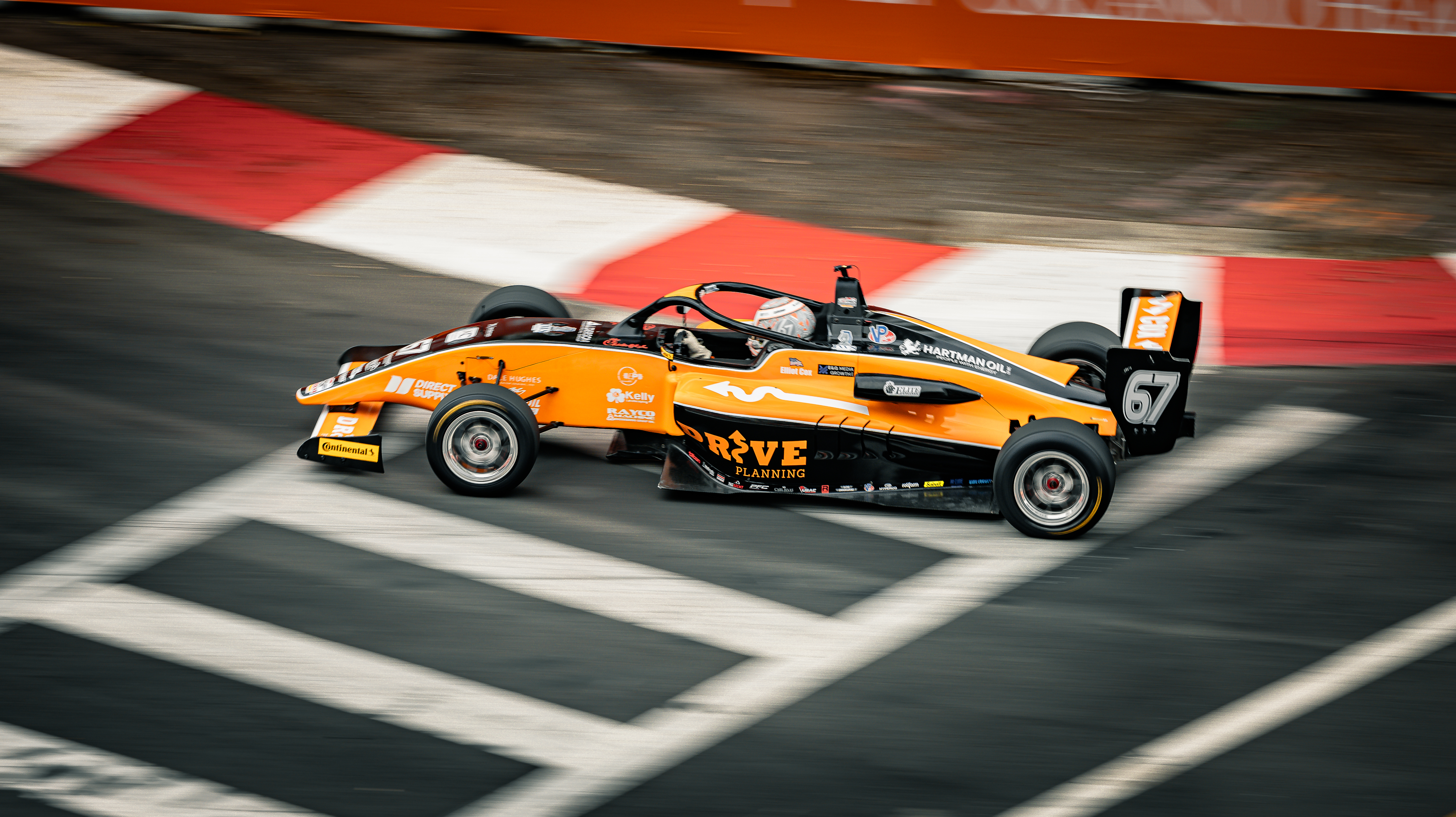
- Cox at the Grand Prix of St. Petersburg in 2024
- Nationality: (United States) American
- Born: August 23, 2007 (age 19) Indianapolis, Indiana, U.S.

USF Pro 2000 Championship career
- Debut season: 2025
- Current team: Turn 3 Motorsport
- Car number: 22
- Starts: 0
- Wins: 0
- Podiums: 0
- Poles: 0
- Fastest laps: 0

Previous series
- 2023–24 2022 2022 2022 2021: USF2000 Championship; Lucas Oil Formula Car Race Series; USF Juniors; YACademy Winter Series; FRP Eastern Pro 4 Challenge

Elliot Cox (born August 23, 2007) is an American racing driver who last competed in the USF2000 Championship for Sarah Fisher Hartman Racing. Cox previously competed in the 2024 USF2000 Championship driving for the same team.

== Karting ==
Cox began karting at the age of five. He has won a Superkart title, in addition to 82 wins.

== Racing career ==
=== Early career ===
Cox competed in YACademy Winter Series, finishing in 12th in 2021 and 3rd in 2022, in addition to claiming one win. He also competed in the F4 Eastern (also known as the FRP Eastern Pro 4 Challenge), finishing sixth.

=== USF Championships ===
==== 2022 ====
In 2022, Cox partook in the inaugural season of the USF Juniors with Sarah Fisher Hartman Racing Development. He missed the final round of the season, and finished eleventh in the standings.

==== 2023 ====
On February 6, 2023, it was announced that Cox will move up to the 2023 USF2000 Championship to drive the No. 67 for Sarah Fisher Hartman Racing Development. He finished 12th in the championship.

==== 2024 ====
Cox returned the series for the 2024 season, once again with Sarah Fisher Hartman Racing Development. He got his first podium in race 3 at his home track of Indianapolis Motor Speedway. Cox finished on the podium two more times with a best finish of second coming in the final round at Portland International Raceway. He finished sixth in the championship.

== Early and personal life ==
Cox was born on August 23, 2007 to Amanda and Travis Cox. Cox has dyslexia. As a child, his favorite IndyCar driver was Justin Wilson, who also had dyslexia.

=== Driving for Dyslexia ===
Cox helps run Driving for Dyslexia, a charity that raises money for the condition by hosting annual racing events.

== Racing record ==
=== Career summary ===
Season	Series	Team	Races	Wins	Poles	F/Laps	Podiums	Points	Position
2021	FRP Eastern Pro 4 Challenge	N/A	2	0	0	0	2	84	6th
2021	YACademy Winter Series	Sarah Fisher Hartman Racing Development							12th
2022	YACademy Winter Series	Sarah Fisher Hartman Racing Development	6	1	0	1	3	63	**3rd**
2022	USF Juniors	Sarah Fisher Hartman Racing Development	13	0	0	0	0	140	11th
2022	Lucas Oil Formula Car Race Series	N/A	4	2	0	0	2	122	15th
2023	USF2000 Championship	Sarah Fisher Hartman Racing Development	16	0	0	0	0	145	12th
2024	USF2000 Championship	Sarah Fisher Hartman Racing Development	18	0	0	1	3	264	6th
2025	USF Pro 2000 Championship	Turn 3 Motorsport	2	0	0	0	0	5	27th
2025	USF2000 Championship	Sarah Fisher Hartman Racing	1	0	0	0	0	21	27th

* Season still in progress.

=== American open-wheel racing results ===
==== USF Juniors ====
(key) (Races in bold indicate pole position) (Races in italics indicate fastest lap) (Races with * indicate most race laps led)

Year	Team	1	2	3	4	5	6	7	8	9	10	11	12	13	14	15	16	17	Rank	Points
2022	Sarah Fisher Hartman Racing Development	OIR; 1; 9	OIR; 2; 8	OIR; 3 C†	ALA; 1; 11	ALA; 2; 11	VIR; 1; 12	VIR; 2; 5	VIR; 3; 16	MOH; 1; 7	MOH; 2; 10	MOH; 3; 11	ROA; 1; 4	ROA; 2; 16	ROA; 3; 16	COA; 1	COA; 2	COA; 3	11th	140

† Race was cancelled due to inclement weather.

==== USF2000 Championship ====
(key) (Races in bold indicate pole position) (Races in italics indicate fastest lap) (Races with * indicate most race laps led)

Year	Team	1	2	3	4	5	6	7	8	9	10	11	12	13	14	15	16	17	18	Rank	Points
2023	Sarah Fisher Hartman Racing Development	STP; 1; 18	STP; 2; 18	SEB; 1; 7	SEB; 1; 5	IMS; 1; 16	IMS; 2; 7	IMS; 3; 17	IRP; 9	ROA; 1; 5	ROA; 2; 18	MOH; 1; 22	MOH; 2; 23	MOH; 3; 23	TOR; 1; 17	TOR; 2; 14	POR; 1; 10	POR; 2; 8	POR; 3; 12	12th	145
2024	Sarah Fisher Hartman Racing Development	STP; 1; 4	STP; 2; 4	NOL; 1; 12	NOL; 2; 13	NOL; 3; 16	IMS; 1; 7	IMS; 2; 3	IRP; 6	ROA; 1; 5	ROA; 2; 14	MOH; 1; 6	MOH; 2; 3	MOH; 3; 15	TOR; 1; 5	TOR; 2; 6	POR; 1; 14	POR; 2; 2*	POR; 3; 12*	6th	264
2025	Sarah Fisher Hartman Racing	STP; 1	STP; 2	NOL; 1	NOL; 2	NOL; 3	IMS; 1	IMS; 2	IRP; 7	ROA; 1	ROA; 2	MOH; 1	MOH; 2	MOH; 3	TOR; 1	TOR; 2	POR; 1	POR; 2	POR; 3	27th	21

==== USF Pro 2000 Championship ====
(key) (Races in bold indicate pole position) (Races in italics indicate fastest lap)

Year	Team	1	2	3	4	5	6	7	8	9	10	11	12	13	14	15	16	17	18	Position	Points
2025	Turn 3 Motorsport	STP; 1; 17	STP; 2; 20	LOU; 1	LOU; 2	LOU; 3	IMS; 1	IMS; 2	IMS; 3	IRP	ROA; 1	ROA; 2	ROA; 3	MOH; 1	MOH; 2	TOR; 1	TOR; 2	POR; 1	POR; 2	27th	5

* Season still in progress.
