= Maite Cáceres =

Uruguayan racing driver (born 2002)

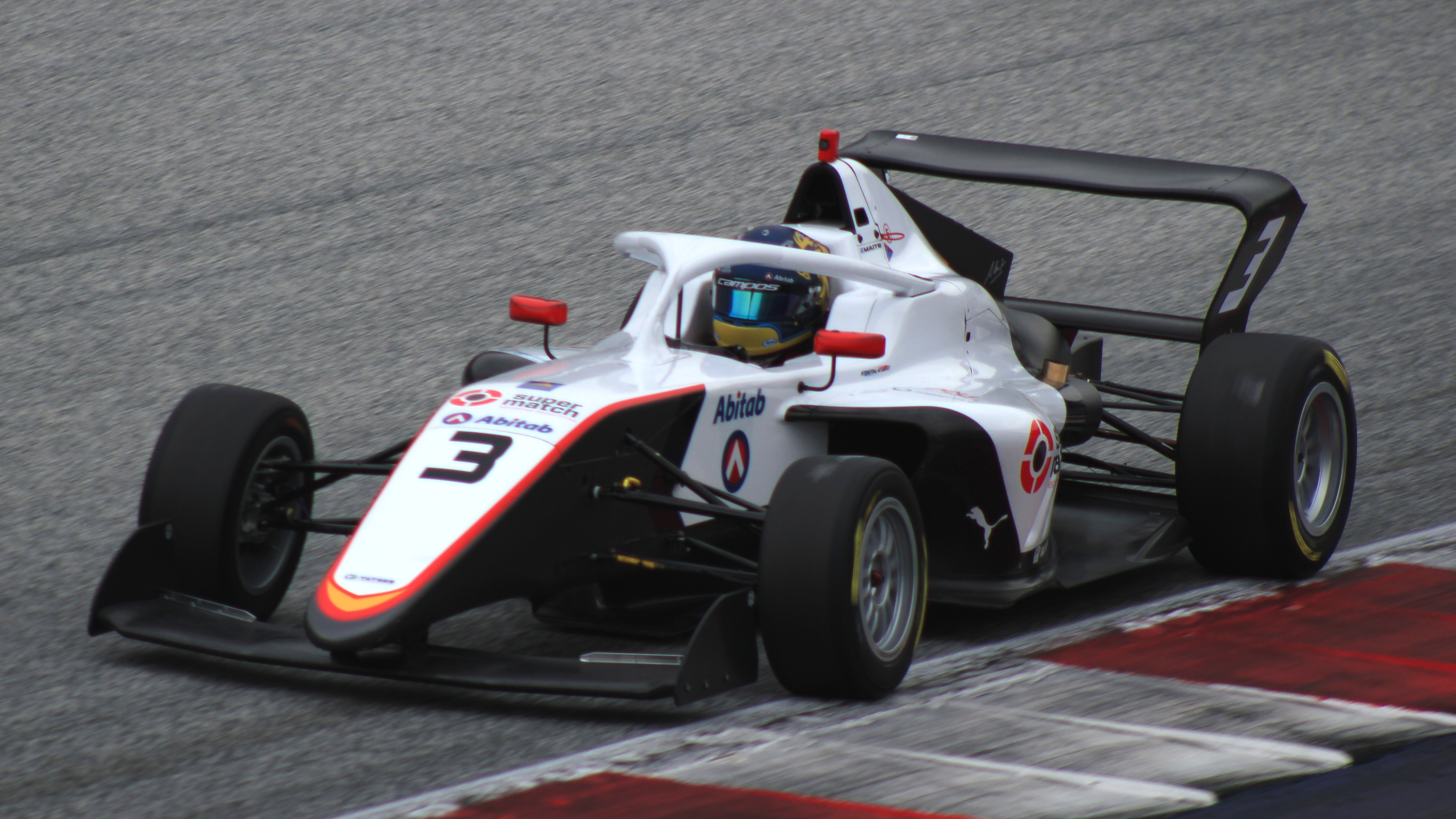
- Cáceres at the Red Bull Ring in 2023
- Born: Maite Cáceres Grolero; 6 August 2002 (age 24); Maldonado, Uruguay
- Nationality: (Uruguay) Uruguayan
- Relatives: Juan Cáceres (brother)

Previous series
- 2023 2023 2022 2022: F1 Academy; Formula Winter Series; Formula 4 United States Championship; USF Juniors

Maite Cáceres Grolero (born 6 August 2002) is an Uruguayan racing driver currently competing for RAFA Racing Team in the Toyota GR Cup North America.

== Career ==
Cáceres began karting in her native Uruguay in 2018. Racing in karts until 2021, Cáceres most notably finished third in the Uruguayan Karting Championship in the DD2 class in 2020. In 2021, Cáceres also made her single-seater debut by competing in Fórmula 4 Uruguay and the FRP Eastern F4 championship.

After partaking in W Series-organized tests in Arizona in early 2022, Cáceres then joined International Motorsport to race in the Formula 4 United States Championship. Racing with them through the first three rounds and scoring a best result of 12th with them, Cáceres skipped the following two rounds before competing for Future Star Racing in the season-ending round at Circuit of the Americas. During 2022, Cáceres also raced for International Motorsport in the final two rounds of the USF Juniors season, taking a best result of 11th twice.

Cáceres then joined Campos Racing to compete in two rounds of the Formula Winter Series and the full F1 Academy season. Racing at Valencia and Barcelona in the former, Cáceres scored a best result of eighth in race one of the latter round. After scoring no points throughout the first four rounds, she finished tenth in the third race at Zandvoort to score her first points of the season. In the following three rounds, Cáceres scored points twice more, finishing eighth at both Monza and Le Castellet, on her way to 15th in points in her only season in the series.

The following year, Cáceres was set to drive in the Formula 4 United States Championship with International Motorsport, but instead opted to race in the Ligier JS F4 Series for the same team. In the series' first ever round, Cáceres finished second and third in the first two races before closing out the weekend with a fifth-place finish. Cáceres then finished no lower than fifth in the following five races, while taking podiums at Road America and Mid-Ohio, before scoring only three points in the second-to-last round at New Jersey Motorsports Park. In the final round of the season at Circuit of the Americas, Cáceres scored her fifth podium of the season in race one and finished fifth and 12th in the other two races to secure third in points.

In 2025, Cáceres joined RAFA Racing Team to race in the Mazda MX-5 Cup, scoring a best result of 11th at St. Petersburg as she ended the year 28th in points after missing two rounds. After a brief return to single-seaters with Olivia Racing in Formula Fara and the YACademy Winter Series during the winter, Cáceres returned to RAFA Racing Team to race in the Toyota GR Cup North America for the rest of 2026.

== Personal life ==
Cáceres is the daughter of Fernando Cáceres and is the younger sister of Juan Cáceres, both former racing drivers.

== Racing record ==
=== Racing career summary ===
Season	Series	Team	Races	Wins	Poles	F/Laps	Podiums	Points	Position
2021	Fórmula 4 Uruguay		6	0	0	0	2	45	9th
2022	Formula 4 United States Championship	International Motorsport	9	0	0	0	0	0	33rd
2022	Formula 4 United States Championship	Future Star Racing	3	0	0	0	0	0	33rd
2022	USF Juniors	International Motorsport	6	0	0	0	0	45	21st
2023	Formula Winter Series	Campos Racing	4	0	0	0	0	9	15th
2023	F1 Academy	Campos Racing	21	0	0	0	0	6	15th
2024	Ligier JS F4 Series	International Motorsport	15	0	0	2	5	137	**3rd**
2025	Mazda MX-5 Cup	RAFA Racing Team by MMR	10	0	0	0	0	780	28th
2025–26	Formula Fara	Olivia Racing	9	1	0	3	7	196	5th
2026	YACademy Winter Series	Olivia Racing	2	0	0	0	0	1	25th
2026	Toyota GR Cup North America	RAFA Racing Team	12	0	0	0	0	0	24th

* Season still in progress

=== Complete Formula 4 United States Championship results ===
(key) (Races in bold indicate pole position) (Races in italics indicate fastest lap)

Year	Team	1	2	3	4	5	6	7	8	9	10	11	12	13	14	15	16	17	18	Pos	Points
2022	International Motorsport	NOL; 1; 17	NOL; 2; 16	NOL; 3 Ret	ROA; 1 Ret	ROA; 2; 12	ROA; 3 Ret	MOH; 1; 17	MOH; 2; 18	MOH; 3; 17	NJM; 1	NJM; 2	NJM; 3	VIR; 1	VIR; 2	VIR; 3				33rd	0
2022	Future Star Racing																COA; 1; 15	COA; 2; 15	COA; 3; 21	33rd	0

=== American open-wheel racing results ===
==== USF Juniors ====
(key) (Races in bold indicate pole position) (Races in italics indicate fastest lap)

Year	Team	1	2	3	4	5	6	7	8	9	10	11	12	13	14	15	16	17	Pos	Points
2022	International Motorsport	OIR; 1	OIR; 2	OIR; 3	ALA; 1	ALA; 2	VIR; 1	VIR; 2	VIR; 3	MDO; 1	MDO; 2	MDO; 3	ROA; 1; 11	ROA; 2; 12	ROA; 3; 13	COA; 1; 19	COA; 2; 11	COA; 3; 15	21st	45

=== Complete Formula Winter Series results ===
(key) (Races in bold indicate pole position; races in italics indicate fastest lap)

Year	Team	1	2	3	4	5	6	7	8	DC	Points
2023	Campos Racing	JER; 1	JER; 2	CRT; 1; 10	CRT; 2; 9	NAV; 1	NAV; 2	CAT; 2; 8	CAT; 2; 9†	15th	9

† – Drivers did not finish the race, but were classified as they completed more than 75% of the race distance.

=== Complete F1 Academy results ===
(key) (Races in bold indicate pole position; races in italics indicate fastest lap)

Year	Team	1	2	3	4	5	6	7	8	9	10	11	12	13	14	15	16	17	18	19	20	21	DC	Points
2023	Campos Racing	RBR; 1; 11	RBR; 2; 13	RBR; 3; 14	CRT; 1; 13	CRT; 2; 10	CRT; 3; 12	CAT; 1; 13	CAT; 2; 13	CAT; 3; 12	ZAN; 1; 14	ZAN; 2; 13	ZAN; 3; 10	MNZ; 1; 12	MNZ; 2; 8	MNZ; 3; 11†	LEC; 1; 8	LEC; 2; 12	LEC; 3; 11	COA; 1 Ret	COA; 2; 12	COA; 3; 12	15th	6

=== Complete Ligier JS F4 Series results ===
(key) (Races in bold indicate pole position; races in italics indicate fastest lap)

Year	Team	1	2	3	4	5	6	7	8	9	10	11	12	13	14	15	DC	Points
2024	International Motorsport	NOL; 1; 2	NOL; 2; 3	NOL; 3; 5	ROA; 1; 5	ROA; 2; 4	ROA; 3; 3	MOH; 1; 4	MOH; 2; 3	MOH; 3; 13	NJM; 1; 8	NJM; 2; 10	NJM; 3 Ret	COA; 1; 3	COA; 2; 5	COA; 3; 12	3rd	137
