= Ethan Ho =

Taiwanese-American racing driver (born 2005)

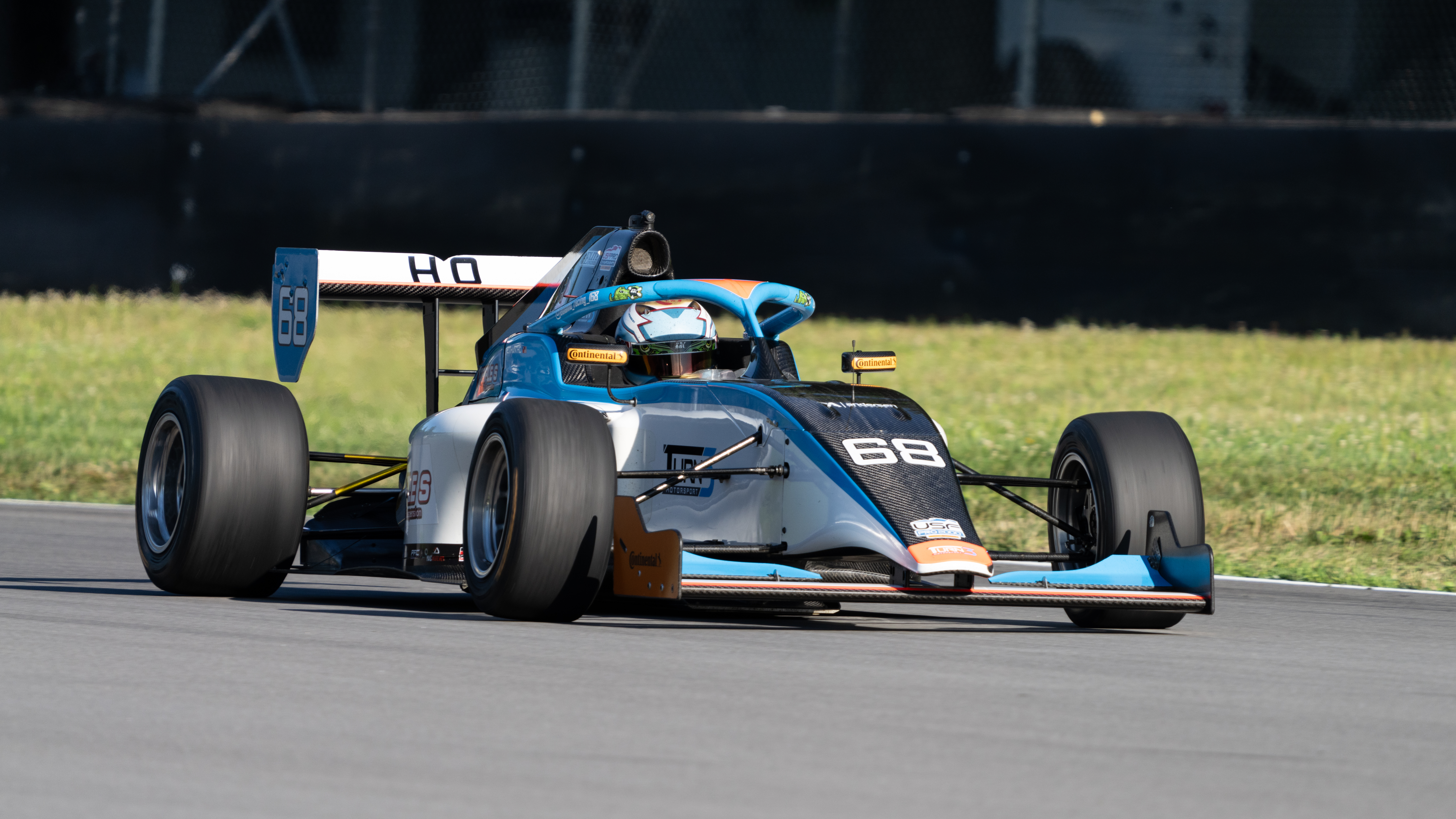
- Ho at the Mid-Ohio Sports Car Course in 2024
- Nationality: (Taiwan) Taiwanese (United States) American via dual nationality
- Born: 14 July 2005 (age 21) Los Angeles, California, U.S.

F4 Chinese Championship career
- Debut season: 2024
- Current team: Team KRC
- Car number: TBA
- Starts: 12 (12 entries)
- Wins: 0
- Podiums: 2
- Poles: 0
- Fastest laps: 0
- Best finish: 9th in 2024

Previous series
- 2024 2024 2023 2022–23 2022–23: F4 Japanese; USF Pro 2000; F4 SEA; USF2000; USF Juniors

Chinese name
- Traditional Chinese: 賀正權
- Simplified Chinese: 贺正权

Ho Cheng-chuan (Chinese: 賀正權; pinyin: Hè Zhèngquán; Jyutping: Ho6 Zing3 Kyun4; born 14 July 2005), commonly known as Ethan Ho, is a Taiwanese-American racing driver who currently competes in the 2025 F4 Chinese Championship for Team KRC. He previously competed in the 2024 USF Pro 2000 Championship driving for Turn 3 Motorsport.

== Career ==
=== USF Juniors ===
==== 2022 ====
In 2022, Ho joined the newly formed USF Juniors series for its inaugural season. He would drive full-time for DC Autosport with Cape Motorsports. Ho would have a fairly consistent season, with a best finish of fourth in race three at Circuit of the Americas. He would finish seventh in the standings.

==== 2023 ====
Ho returned to the series for the 2023 season, once again driving for DC Autosport. In race one at Virginia International Raceway, Ho qualified on pole position, however, he would finish 13th in the race due to a collision with Max Taylor. He would get his first podium and best result of the season of third in race two at Mid-Ohio.

=== USF2000 Championship ===
==== 2022 ====
At the end of 2022, Ho entered the final round of the 2022 USF2000 Championship at Portland, driving for Velocity Racing Development. In the three races he entered, he finished a high of 11th in race two.

==== 2023 ====
Alongside his campaign in the USF Juniors, Ho competed in select rounds of the 2023 USF2000 Championship driving for DC Autosport. He would have a best finish of fifth in race three at Indianapolis, and went on to finish 14th in the championship.

=== Formula 4 South East Asia Championship ===
==== 2023 ====
Following his campaigns on the American open-wheel racing ladder, Ho moved overseas to compete part-time in the 2023 Formula 4 South East Asia Championship for Team KRC. He had a best finish of third in race three at Zhuhai International Circuit.

=== USF Pro 2000 Championship ===
Ho moved up the USF Pro Championships ladder to the USF Pro 2000 Championship for the 2024 season, driving for Turn 3 Motorsport. He would have a difficult season with five retirements across thirteen starts. Ho ultimately finished 19th in the standings, last among his full-time teammates.

=== F4 Chinese Championship ===
==== 2024 ====
Ho dovetailed his time in America with a partial campaign in the 2024 F4 Chinese Championship, driving for Taiwanese outfit Team KRC. He would finish ninth in the standings, with a podium in race two at Zhuhai being his best race result.

==== 2025 ====
For 2025, Ho switched over to racing in Asia, returning to Team KRC for the full 2025 F4 Chinese Championship.

== Personal life ==
Ethan is not related to Singaporean F3 driver, Christian Ho.

== Racing record ==
=== Racing career summary ===
Season	Series	Team	Races	Wins	Poles	F/Laps	Podiums	Points	Position
2020	Skip Barber Formula Race Series	Skip Barber Racing School	6	0	1	1	3	178	**2nd**
2021	Formula Pro USA - F4 Western Championship	Dave Freitas Racing	2	0	0	0	1	23	10th
2022	USF Juniors	DC Autosport w/ Cape Motorsports	16	0	0	0	0	182	7th
2022	USF2000 Championship	Velocity Racing Development	3	0	0	0	0	27	25th
2022	FIA Motorsport Games Formula 4 Cup	Team Chinese Taipei	1	0	0	0	0	N/A	16th
2023	USF2000 Championship	DC Autosport	13	0	0	0	0	137	14th
2023	USF Juniors	DC Autosport	10	0	1	0	1	134	14th
2023	Formula 4 South East Asia Championship	Team KRC	3	0	0	0	1	19	18th
2023	Macau Formula 4 Race	Team KRC	2	0	0	0	0	N/A	5th
2024	USF Pro 2000 Championship	Turn 3 Motorsport	13	0	0	0	0	80	19th
2024	F4 Japanese Championship	HELM Motorsports	2	0	0	0	0	0	24th
2024	F4 Chinese Championship	Team KRC	8	0	0	0	1	69	9th
2025	F4 Chinese Championship	Team KRC	20	0	0	0	6	156	6th
2025	China GT Championship - GTS	Team KRC	4	2	?	?	4	86	**3rd**
2026	China GT Championship - GTS	Team KRC							

=== American open-wheel racing results ===
==== USF Juniors ====
(key) (Races in bold indicate pole position) (Races in italics indicate fastest lap) (Races with * indicate most race laps led)

Year	Team	1	2	3	4	5	6	7	8	9	10	11	12	13	14	15	16	17	Rank	Points
2022	DC Autosport with Cape Motorsports	OIR; 1; 12	OIR; 2; 7	OIR; 3 C†	ALA; 1; 7	ALA; 2; 8	VIR; 1; 6	VIR; 2; 16	VIR; 3; 9	MOH; 1; 9	MOH; 2; 13	MOH; 3; 8	ROA; 1; 13	ROA; 2; 5	ROA; 3; 7	COA; 1; 16	COA; 2; 17	COA; 3; 4	7th	182
2023	DC Autosport	SEB; 1; 8	SEB; 2; 4	SEB; 3; 9	ALA; 1; 6	ALA; 2; 7	**VIR**; **1**; 13	VIR; 2; 10	VIR; 3; 9	MOH; 1; 14	MOH; 2; 3	ROA; 1	ROA; 2	ROA; 3	COA; 1	COA; 2	COA; 3		14th	134

† Race was cancelled due to inclement weather.

==== USF2000 Championship ====
(key) (Races in bold indicate pole position) (Races in italics indicate fastest lap) (Races with * indicate most race laps led)

Year	Team	1	2	3	4	5	6	7	8	9	10	11	12	13	14	15	16	17	18	Rank	Points
2022	Velocity Racing Development	STP; 1	STP; 2	ALA; 1	ALA; 2	IMS; 1	IMS; 2	IMS; 3	IRP	ROA; 1	ROA; 2	MOH; 1	MOH; 2	MOH; 3	TOR; 1	TOR; 2	POR; 1; 12	POR; 2; 11	POR; 3; 13	25th	27
2023	DC Autosport	STP; 1	STP; 2	SEB; 1; 18	SEB; 1; 15	IMS; 1; 8	IMS; 2; 11	IMS; 3; 5	IRP	ROA; 1; 7	ROA; 2; 9	MOH; 1; 6	MOH; 2; 9	MOH; 3; 12	TOR; 1	TOR; 2	POR; 1; 19	POR; 2; 7	POR; 3; 11	14th	137

==== USF Pro 2000 Championship ====
(key) (Races in bold indicate pole position) (Races in italics indicate fastest lap) (Races with * indicate most race laps led)

Year	Team	1	2	3	4	5	6	7	8	9	10	11	12	13	14	15	16	17	18	Rank	Points
2024	Turn 3 Motorsport	STP; 1; 10	STP; 2; 20	LOU; 1; 20	LOU; 2; 12	LOU; 3; 13	IMS; 1; 20	IMS; 2; 9	IMS; 3; 13	IRP; 16	ROA; 1; 16	ROA; 2; 21	ROA; 3 DNS	MOH; 1; 13	MOH; 2; 14	TOR; 1	TOR; 2	POR; 1	POR; 2	19th	80

=== Complete FIA Motorsport Games results ===
Year	Team	Cup	Qualifying	Quali Race	Main Race
2022	Team Chinese Taipei	**Formula 4**	17th	NC	16th

=== Complete Formula 4 South East Asia Championship results ===
(key) (Races in bold indicate pole position; races in italics indicate fastest lap)

Year	Entrant	1	2	3	4	5	6	7	8	9	10	11	Pos	Points
2023	Team KRC	ZHU; 1; 8	ZHU; 2 Ret	ZHU; 3; 3	MAC; 1; 6	MAC; 2; 5	SEP; 1	SEP; 2	SEP; 3	SEP; 1	SEP; 2	SEP; 3	18th	19

=== Complete F4 Japanese Championship results ===
(key) (Races in bold indicate pole position) (Races in italics indicate fastest lap)

Year	Team	1	2	3	4	5	6	7	8	9	10	11	12	13	14	DC	Pts
2024	HELM Motorsports	FUJ1; 1	FUJ1; 2	SUZ; 1	SUZ; 2	FUJ2; 1; 16	FUJ2; 2; 13	SUG; 1	SUG; 2	AUT; 1	MOT; 1	MOT; 2	MOT; 3	SUZ2; 1	SUZ2; 2	24th	0

=== Complete F4 Chinese Championship results ===
(key) (Races in bold indicate pole position) (Races in italics indicate fastest lap)

Year	Team	1	2	3	4	5	6	7	8	9	10	11	12	13	14	15	16	17	18	DC	Points
2024	Team KRC	SIC1; 1	SIC1; 2	CTC; 1	CTC; 2	CTC; 3	CTC; 4	NIC; 1	NIC; 2	NIC; 3	NIC; 4	SIC2; 1; 4	SIC2; 2; 4	SIC2; 3; 7	SIC2; 4; 7	ZIC; 1; 5	ZIC; 2; 3	ZIC; 3; 6	ZIC; 4 Ret	9th	69
