= Toyo Tires F1600 Championship Series =

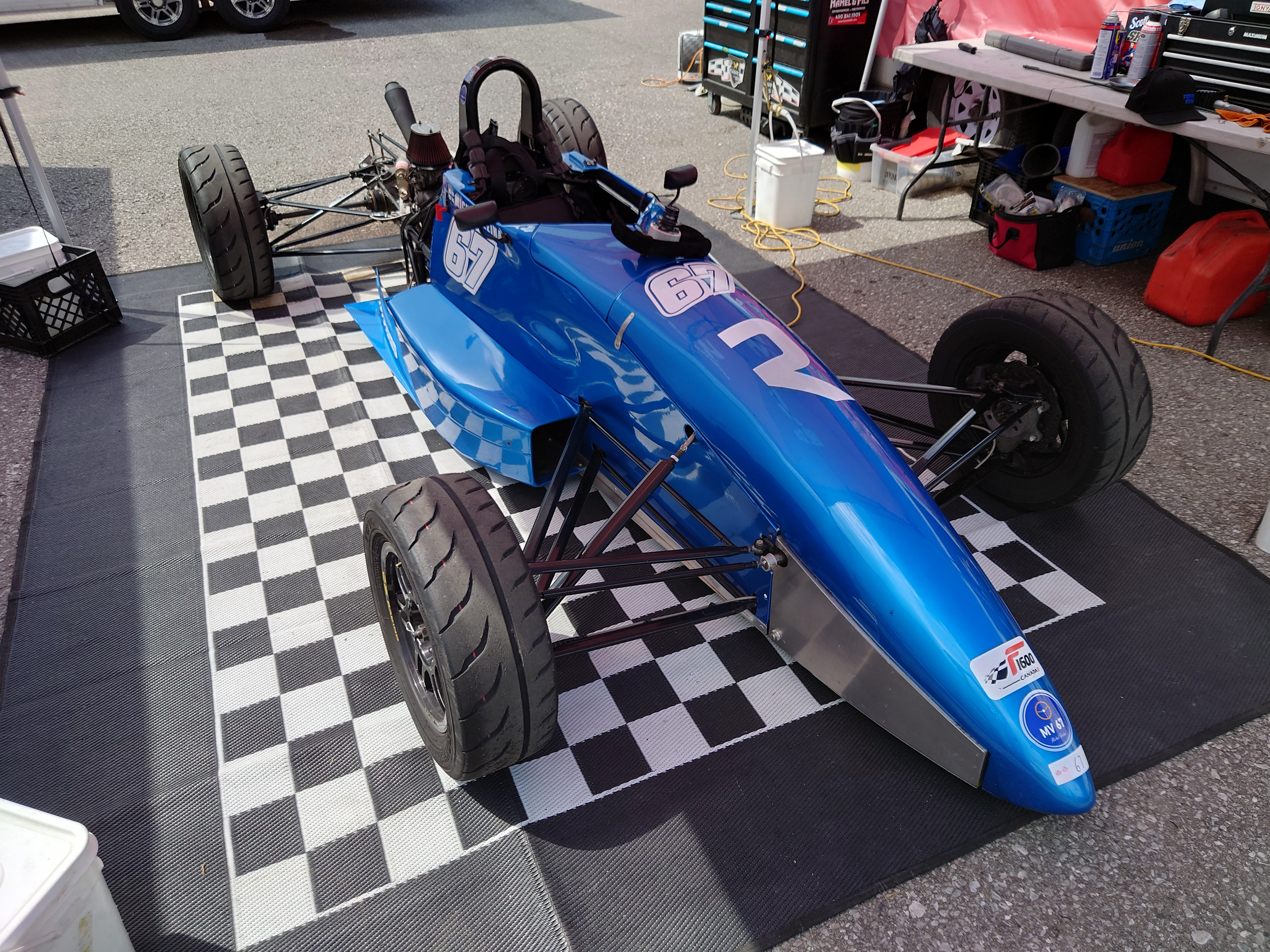
F1600 car

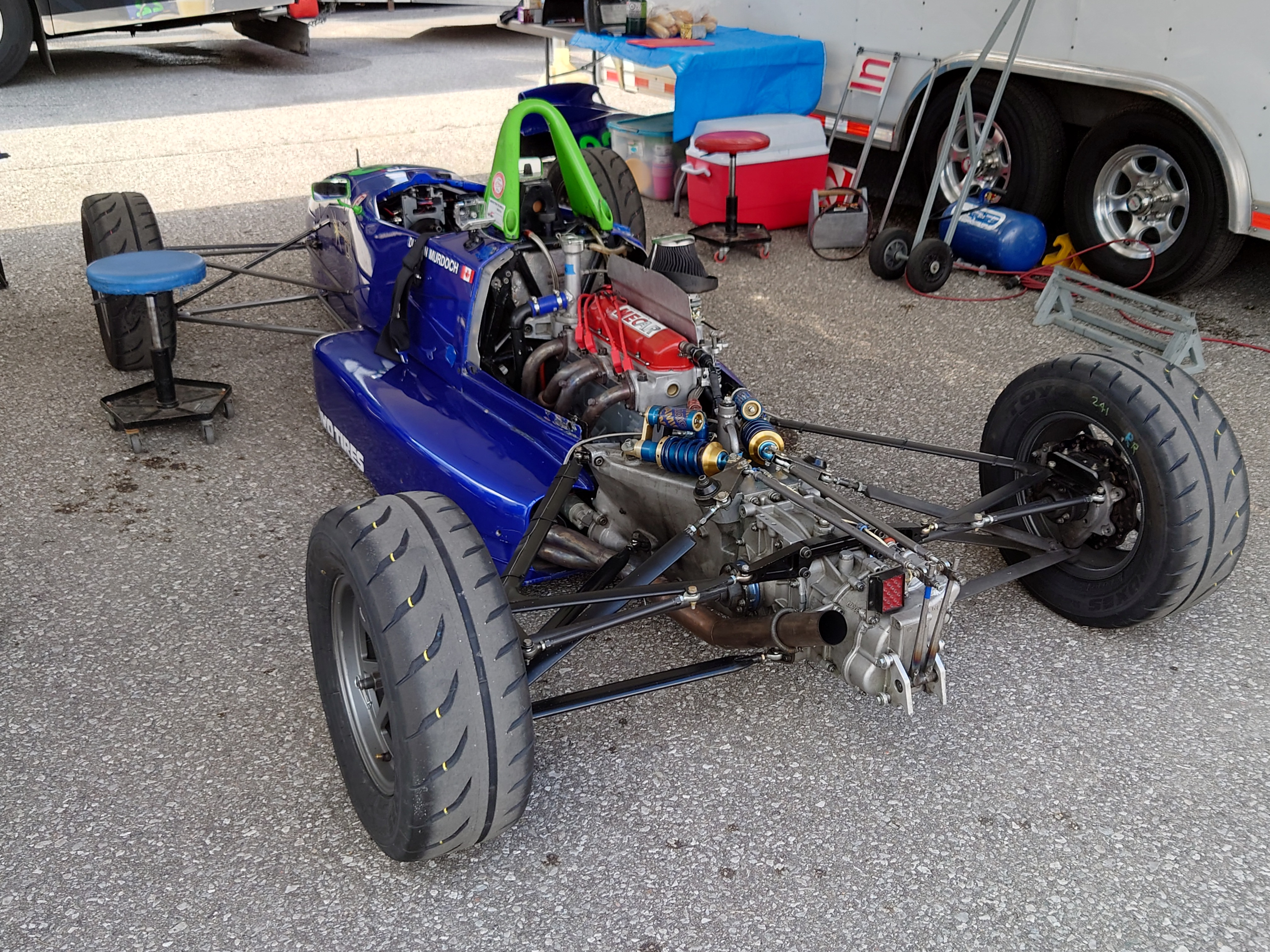
F1600 engine

Toyo Tires F1600 Championship Series is an open-wheel racing championship series based in Ontario, Canada. It features cars powered by 1.6L engines produced by both Ford and Honda. It is sanctioned by the CASC, Ontario region.

It has two distinct classes: the A Class for the newer chassis and the B Class, for cars manufactured in or before 1994.

== History ==
Before 2012, the competition was known as Ontario Formula Ford Championship.

In 2014, F1600 Super Series (a.k.a. Eastern Canadian Super Series) was introduced which united racers from Ontario-based Toyo Tires F1600 Championship and Quebec-based Toyo Tires Formula Tour in a new competition.

F1600 Championship Series is viewed as an entry level formula car competition for the aspiring young racers. Among the past F1600 Championship Series participants are Dalton Kellett, Parker Thompson, Zacharie Robichon and Mac Clark.

== Champions ==
Season	Driver	Hometown	Club
2010	(Canada) Dean Baker	Blackstock, ON	BARC
2011	(United States) Trent Hindman	Wayside, NJ	BARC
2012	(Canada) Michael Adams	Courtice, ON	BEMC
2013	(United States) Jack Mitchell Jr.	Clarendon Hills, IL	BARC
2014	(United States) Tristan DeGrand	Eureka, MO	BARC
2015	(Canada) Reid Arnold	Keswick, ON	OMSC
2016	(Canada) Michael Adams	Courtice, ON	BEMC
2017	(Canada) Ben Hurst	Oakville, ON	BARC
2018	(Canada) Kellen Ritter	North Vancouver, BC	BARC
2019	(Canada) Olivier Bedard	Terrebonne, QC	BARC
2020	(Canada) Mac Clark	Campbellville, ON	BARC
2021	(Canada) Nick Gilkes	Richmond Hill, ON	BARC
2022	(Canada) Jake Cowden	Aurora, ON	BARC
2023	(Canada) Logan Pacza	Cambridge, ON	MSOC

== See also ==
- Formula Ford
- F1600 Championship Series – American counterpart
