= 2022 USF Juniors =

Racing season

The 2022 USF Juniors championship was the inaugural season of USF Juniors. It became the new first rung of the Road to Indy ladder. The season featured a six-round 16-race calendar, which began April 23 at Ozarks International Raceway and concluded on September 18 at the Circuit of the Americas.

== Drivers and teams ==
Team	No.	Drivers	Rounds
Barker Racing	12	(United States) Ethan Barker	5–16
Crosslink Kiwi Motorsports	28	(Brazil) Lucas Fecury	5–10, 14–16
Crosslink Kiwi Motorsports	31	(United States) Titus Sherlock	All
Crosslink Kiwi Motorsports	37	(United States) Madison Aust	8–10, 14–16
Crosslink Kiwi Motorsports	39	(United States) Bryson Morris	14–16
Crosslink Kiwi Motorsports	44	(New Zealand) Bailey Cruse	14–16
Crosslink Kiwi Motorsports	66	(United States) Ryan Shehan	5–7, 14–16
Crosslink Kiwi Motorsports	87	(United States) Jeremy Fairbairn	All
DC Autosport w/Cape Motorsports	24	(United States) Earl Tucker	1–10
DC Autosport w/Cape Motorsports	61	(United States) Nicholas d'Orlando	1–4
DC Autosport w/Cape Motorsports	71	(United States) Ethan Ho	All
DEForce Racing	16	(Australia) Quinn Armstrong	5–16
DEForce Racing	17	(Canada) Mac Clark	All
DEForce Racing	18	(United States) Maxwell Jamieson	All
DEForce Racing	19	(United States) Jake Bonilla	All
Future Star Racing	8	(United States) David Burketh	3–4
IGY6 Motorsports	9	(Philippines) Bianca Bustamante	1–4
IGY6 Motorsports	25	(United States) Jacob Bolen	1–4, 11–13
International Motorsport	21	(Uruguay) Maite Cáceres	11–16
International Motorsport	23	(United States) André Castro	All
International Motorsport	32	(Argentina) Giorgio Carrara	8–16
International Motorsport	53	(France) Alan Isambard	1–13
Sarah Fisher Hartman Racing Development	67	(United States) Elliot Cox	1–13
Velocity Racing Development	7	(United States) Nikita Johnson	All
Velocity Racing Development	14	(United States) Sam Corry	All
Velocity Racing Development	20	(United States) Alessandro de Tullio	All
Velocity Racing Development	55	(United States) Noah Ping	1–4

== Schedule ==
Round	Date	Race name	Circuit	Location
1	April 22–24	Cooper Tires Grand Prix of The Ozarks^{1}	Ozarks International Raceway	Gravois Mills, MO
2	April 22–24	Cooper Tires Grand Prix of The Ozarks^{1}	Ozarks International Raceway	Gravois Mills, MO
-	April 22–24	Cooper Tires Grand Prix of The Ozarks^{1}	Ozarks International Raceway	Gravois Mills, MO
3	April 28–29	Andersen Interior Contracting Grand Prix of Alabama	Barber Motorsports Park	Birmingham, AL
4	April 28–29	Andersen Interior Contracting Grand Prix of Alabama	Barber Motorsports Park	Birmingham, AL
5	June 3–5	Cooper Tires VIR Grand Prix	Virginia International Raceway	Alton, VA
6	June 3–5	Cooper Tires VIR Grand Prix	Virginia International Raceway	Alton, VA
7	June 3–5	Cooper Tires VIR Grand Prix	Virginia International Raceway	Alton, VA
8	July 7–9	Cooper Tires Grand Prix of Mid-Ohio	Mid-Ohio Sports Car Course	Lexington, OH
9	July 7–9	Cooper Tires Grand Prix of Mid-Ohio	Mid-Ohio Sports Car Course	Lexington, OH
10	July 7–9	Cooper Tires Grand Prix of Mid-Ohio	Mid-Ohio Sports Car Course	Lexington, OH
11	July 29–31	Fleet Farm Grand Prix of Road America	Road America	Elkhart Lake, WI
12	July 29–31	Fleet Farm Grand Prix of Road America	Road America	Elkhart Lake, WI
13	July 29–31	Fleet Farm Grand Prix of Road America	Road America	Elkhart Lake, WI
14	September 16–18	Cooper Tires Circuit of the Americas Grand Prix Finale	Circuit of the Americas	Austin, TX
15	September 16–18	Cooper Tires Circuit of the Americas Grand Prix Finale	Circuit of the Americas	Austin, TX
16	September 16–18	Cooper Tires Circuit of the Americas Grand Prix Finale	Circuit of the Americas	Austin, TX

- ^{1} The round at Ozarks International Raceway was scheduled to have 3 races, but the third race was cancelled due to poor weather conditions. To make up for the cancelled race, a third race was added for the event at Mid-Ohio Sports Car Course.

== Race results ==
Round		Circuit	Pole position	Fastest lap	Most laps led	Race Winner	
Round		Circuit	Pole position	Fastest lap	Most laps led	Driver	Team
1	R1	Ozarks International Raceway	(Canada) Mac Clark	(Canada) Mac Clark	(Canada) Mac Clark	(Canada) Mac Clark	DEForce Racing
2	R2	Ozarks International Raceway	(Canada) Mac Clark	(Canada) Mac Clark	(Canada) Mac Clark	(Canada) Mac Clark	DEForce Racing
-	-	Ozarks International Raceway	Race cancelled due to inclement weather				
3	R1	Barber Motorsports Park	(Canada) Mac Clark	(United States) Sam Corry	(Canada) Mac Clark	(Canada) Mac Clark	DEForce Racing
4	R2	Barber Motorsports Park	(Canada) Mac Clark	(Canada) Mac Clark	(Canada) Mac Clark	(Canada) Mac Clark	DEForce Racing
5	R1	Virginia International Raceway	(United States) Jeremy Fairbairn	(United States) Alessandro de Tullio	(United States) Sam Corry	(United States) Alessandro de Tullio	Velocity Racing Development
6	R2	Virginia International Raceway	(Canada) Mac Clark	(United States) Alessandro de Tullio	(Canada) Mac Clark	(United States) Alessandro de Tullio	Velocity Racing Development
7	R3	Virginia International Raceway	(Canada) Mac Clark	(United States) Nikita Johnson	(United States) Alessandro de Tullio	(United States) Alessandro de Tullio	Velocity Racing Development
8	R1	Mid-Ohio Sports Car Course	(Canada) Mac Clark	(United States) Alessandro de Tullio	(Canada) Mac Clark	(United States) Sam Corry	Velocity Racing Development
9	R2	Mid-Ohio Sports Car Course	(Canada) Mac Clark	(United States) Alessandro de Tullio	(Canada) Mac Clark	(United States) Alessandro de Tullio	Velocity Racing Development
10	R3	Mid-Ohio Sports Car Course	(Canada) Mac Clark	(United States) Nikita Johnson	(Canada) Mac Clark	(Canada) Mac Clark	DEForce Racing
11	R1	Road America	(Canada) Mac Clark	(United States) Sam Corry	(United States) Sam Corry	(United States) Sam Corry	Velocity Racing Development
12	R2	Road America	(United States) Sam Corry	(Canada) Mac Clark	(United States) Nikita Johnson	(United States) Nikita Johnson	Velocity Racing Development
13	R3	Road America	(United States) Sam Corry	(United States) Alessandro de Tullio	(United States) Sam Corry	(United States) Alessandro de Tullio	Velocity Racing Development
14	R1	Circuit of the Americas	(United States) Sam Corry	(United States) Nikita Johnson	(United States) Nikita Johnson	(United States) Nikita Johnson	Velocity Racing Development
15	R2	Circuit of the Americas	(United States) Nikita Johnson	(United States) Nikita Johnson	(United States) Bryson Morris	(United States) Sam Corry	Velocity Racing Development
16	R3	Circuit of the Americas	(United States) Nikita Johnson	(United States) Nikita Johnson	(United States) Nikita Johnson	(United States) Nikita Johnson	Velocity Racing Development

== Championship standings ==
=== Drivers' Championship ===
Scoring system

Position	**1st**	**2nd**	**3rd**	**4th**	**5th**	**6th**	**7th**	**8th**	**9th**	**10th**	**11th**	**12th**	**13th**	**14th**	**15th**	**16th**	**17th**	**18th**	**19th**	**20th+**
Points	30	25	22	19	17	15	14	13	12	11	10	9	8	7	6	5	4	3	2	1

- The driver who qualifies on pole is awarded one additional point.
- One point is awarded to the driver who leads the most laps in a race.
- One point is awarded to the driver who sets the fastest lap during the race.

Pos	Driver	OIR			ALA		VIR			MOH			ROA			COA			Points
1	(Canada) Mac Clark	**1***	**1***	C	**1***	**1***	4	**10***	**2**	**2***	**2***	**1***	**15**	3	4	2	3	3	393
2	(United States) Sam Corry	3	3	C	2	4	3*	12	3	1	4	5	1*	**2**	**2***	**4**	1	2	369
3	(United States) Nikita Johnson	2	6	C	3	5	2	13	4	4	3	2	3	1*	3	1*	**10**	**1***	352
4	(United States) Alessandro de Tullio	6	2	C	4	DNS	1	1	1*	3	1	3	2	DSQ	1	10	14	9	314
5	(United States) Andre Castro	4	4	C	5	2	10	6	8	8	7	12	12	4	6	17	5	7	233
6	(United States) Jeremy Fairbairn	5	13	C	6	3	**11**	14	10	6	6	7	17	13	8	6	4	14	201
7	(United States) Ethan Ho	12	7	C	7	8	6	16	9	9	13	8	13	5	7	16	17	4	182
8	(United States) Titus Sherlock	11	5	C	16	9	5	2	6	12	16	10	6	15	15	8	18	12	178
9	(United States) Jake Bonilla	8	14	C	10	16	9	4	7	14	18	16	7	10	10	18	6	11	160
10	(France) Alan Isambard	7	15	C	18	DNS	7	3	5	18	8	6	5	6	9				151
11	(United States) Elliot Cox	9	8	C	11	11	12	5	16	7	10	11	4	16	16				140
12	(Australia) Quinn Armstrong						8	7	12	13	9	9	16	8	11	9	19	8	123
13	(Argentina) Giorgio Carrara									5	5	4	8	9	5	11	15	10	122
14	(United States) Ethan Barker						13	9	15	11	11	17	9	7	17	7	7	19	110
15	(United States) Maxwell Jamieson	DNS	DNS	C	14	13	17	17	DNS	17	14	13	10	11	14	15	8	13	97
16	(United States) Ryan Shehan						16	8	11							5	9	6	72
17	(Brazil) Lucas Fecury						14	11	13	10	12	14				13	16	16	70
18	(United States) Bryson Morris															3	2*	5	65
19	(United States) Earl Tucker	13	9	C	13	14	15	15	14	16	17	DNS							63
20	(United States) Noah Ping	10	12	C	9	7													46
21	(Uruguay) Maite Cáceres												11	12	13	19	11	15	45
22	(United States) Nicholas d'Orlando	DNS	11	C	8	6													39
23	(United States) Jacob Bolen	15	DNS	C	17	15							14	14	12				39
24	(United States) Madison Aust									15	15	15				14	12	17	38
25	(Philippines) Bianca Bustamante	14	10	C	15	12													32
26	(United States) David Burketh				12	10													20
27	(New Zealand) Bailey Cruse															12	13	18	20
Pos	Driver	OIR			ALA		VIR			MOH			ROA			COA			Points

Color	Result
Gold	Winner
Silver	2nd place
Bronze	3rd place
Green	4th & 5th place
Light Blue	6th–10th place
Dark Blue	Finished (Outside Top 10)
Purple	Did not finish
Red	Did not qualify (DNQ)
Brown	Withdrawn (Wth)
Black	Disqualified (DSQ)
White	Did not start (DNS)
White	Race cancelled (C)
Blank	Did not participate

**In-line notation**
**Bold**	Pole position (1 point)
Italics	Ran fastest race lap (1 point)
*	Led most race laps (1 point); Not awarded if more than one driver leads most laps
Rookie

== See also ==
- 2022 IndyCar Series
- 2022 Indy Lights
- 2022 Indy Pro 2000 Championship
- 2022 U.S. F2000 National Championship
