= Ryan Shehan =

American racing driver (born 2005)

- Nationality: (United States) American
- Born: February 11, 2005 (age 21) Cedar Park, Texas, U.S.

Formula Regional Americas Championship career
- Debut season: 2023
- Current team: Crosslink Kiwi Motorsports
- Car number: 66
- Starts: 9 (9 entries)
- Wins: 2
- Podiums: 9
- Poles: 1
- Fastest laps: 2
- Best finish: TBD in 2023

Previous series
- 2023 2022 2021-22: Formula Regional Oceania Championship; USF Juniors; Formula 4 United States Championship

Ryan Shehan (born February 11, 2005) is an American racing driver who last competed in the Formula Regional Americas Championship with Crosslink Kiwi Motorsports. He previously competed in the Formula Regional Oceania Championship with Giles Motorsport.

== Career ==
=== Lower formulae ===
Shehan made his car racing debut in 2021, competing for Crosslink/Kiwi Motorsport in the F4 United States Championship. He finished 24th in his first season achieving three points finishes.

The following year, Shehan returned to the F4 United States series, once again teaming up with Crosslink/Kiwi Motorsport. His campaign started out in a positive manner, as he scored his first podium in car racing at the NOLA Motorsports Park. After scoring more points at Road America, Shehan took a pair of podiums at the third round in Mid-Ohio. This proved to be the start of a title challenge, with a maiden win coming at New Jersey following a penalty to original winner Lochie Hughes owing to a false start, during a weekend that also included two further podiums. Shehan won again in Race 1 in Virginia and took third place in the following race, which gave him a fighting chance for the championship going into the season finale. However, two points-scoring results proved to be insufficient, with Shehan finishing fourth in the standings. Nevertheless, he had scored sufficient points to help Crosslink secure the teams' championship.

=== Formula Regional Oceania Championship ===
At the start of 2023, Shehan competed in the Formula Regional Oceania Championship with Giles Motorsport. At the season opener held at the Highlands Motorsport Park, Shehan was forced to retire with three laps to go in Race 1, crashing at the Southern Loop during a battle with Jacob Abel. He went on to score points in the subsequent pair of races, before taking an eighth place during the first race at Teretonga, allowing him to start Race 2 from pole position. In a race with wet weather conditions, Shehan was overtaken by Callum Hedge, but managed to hold off the other competitors to finish on the podium for the first time in the category. Another appearance on the rostrum followed at Manfield with a third place in the second race, where he benefited from a collision between Louis Foster and Charlie Wurz ahead of him. Shehan's results tailed off in the final part of the campaign, with him scoring just one more top-ten finish at Taupo to end up tenth in the drivers' standings.

== Racing record ==
=== Racing career summary ===
| Season | Series | Team | Races | Wins | Poles | F/Laps | Podiums | Points | Position |
|---|---|---|---|---|---|---|---|---|---|
| 2021 | Formula 4 United States Championship | Crosslink/Kiwi Motorsport | 17 | 0 | 0 | 1 | 0 | 4 | 24th |
| 2022 | Formula 4 United States Championship | Crosslink/Kiwi Motorsport | 18 | 2 | 0 | 1 | 8 | 169.5 | 4th |
| 2022 | USF Juniors | Crosslink/Kiwi Motorsport | 6 | 0 | 0 | 0 | 0 | 72 | 16th |
| 2023 | Formula Regional Oceania Championship | Giles Motorsport | 15 | 0 | 0 | 0 | 2 | 173 | 10th |
| 2023 | Formula Regional Americas Championship | Crosslink Kiwi Motorsports | 18 | 2 | 1 | 2 | 13 | 279 | **2nd** |
| 2024 | Formula Regional Americas Championship | Crosslink Kiwi Motorsports | 11 | 4 | 0 | 1 | 8 | 188 | **2nd** |
| 2024 | Ligier European Series - JS2 R | Les Deux Arbres | 2 | 0 | 0 | 0 | 0 | 6 | 14th |

* Season still in progress.

=== Complete Formula 4 United States Championship results ===
(key) (Races in bold indicate pole position) (Races in italics indicate fastest lap)

| Year | Team | 1 | 2 | 3 | 4 | 5 | 6 | 7 | 8 | 9 | 10 | 11 | 12 | 13 | 14 | 15 | 16 | 17 | 18 | Pos | Points |
|---|---|---|---|---|---|---|---|---|---|---|---|---|---|---|---|---|---|---|---|---|---|
| 2021 | Crosslink/Kiwi Motorsport | ATL; 1; 22 | ATL; 2; 14 | ATL; 3; 21 | ROA; 1; 7 | ROA; 2; 9 | ROA; 3; 14 | MOH; 1; 13 | MOH; 2; 13 | MOH; 3; 23 | BRA; 1; 11 | BRA; 2; 9 | BRA; 3; 10 | VIR; 1 Ret | VIR; 2; 12 | VIR; 3; 19† | COA; 1; 13 | COA; 2; 13 | | 24th | 4 |
| 2022 | Crosslink/Kiwi Motorsport | NOL; 1; 3 | NOL; 2; 4 | NOL; 3; 8 | ROA; 1; 8 | ROA; 2; 8 | ROA; 3; 11 | MOH; 1; 2 | MOH; 2; 19 | MOH; 3; 3 | NJM; 1; 1 | NJM; 2; 3 | NJM; 3; 2 | VIR; 1; 1 | VIR; 2; 3 | VIR; 3 Ret | COA; 1; 9 | COA; 2; 11 | COA; 3; 5 | 4th | 169.5 |

=== Complete Formula Regional Oceania Championship results ===
(key) (Races in bold indicate pole position) (Races in italics indicate fastest lap)

| Year | Team | 1 | 2 | 3 | 4 | 5 | 6 | 7 | 8 | 9 | 10 | 11 | 12 | 13 | 14 | 15 | DC | Points |
|---|---|---|---|---|---|---|---|---|---|---|---|---|---|---|---|---|---|---|
| 2023 | Giles Motorsport | HIG; 1 Ret | HIG; 2; 8 | HIG; 3; 7 | TER; 1; 8 | TER; 2; 2 | TER; 3; 6 | MAN; 1; 8 | MAN; 2; 3 | MAN; 3; 10 | HMP; 1; 12 | HMP; 2; 12 | HMP; 3; 11 | TAU; 1; 10 | TAU; 2; 16 | TAU; 3; 11 | 10th | 173 |

=== Complete Formula Regional Americas Championship results ===
(key) (Races in bold indicate pole position) (Races in italics indicate fastest lap)

| Year | Team | 1 | 2 | 3 | 4 | 5 | 6 | 7 | 8 | 9 | 10 | 11 | 12 | 13 | 14 | 15 | 16 | 17 | 18 | 19 | 20 | 21 | DC | Points |
|---|---|---|---|---|---|---|---|---|---|---|---|---|---|---|---|---|---|---|---|---|---|---|---|---|
| 2023 | Crosslink Kiwi Motorsports | **NOL**; **1**; 1 | NOL; 2; 1 | NOL; 3; 3 | ROA; 1; 2 | ROA; 2; 2 | ROA; 3; 2 | MOH; 1; 2 | MOH; 2; 2 | MOH; 3; 2 | NJM; 1; 4 | NJM; 2; 2 | NJM; 3; 6 | VIR; 1; 2 | VIR; 2; 2 | VIR; 3; 2 | COA; 1; 10 | COA; 2; 4 | COA; 3; 10 | | | | 2nd | 279 |
| 2024 | Crosslink Kiwi Motorsport | NOL; 1; 5 | NOL; 2; 4 | NOL; 3; 1 | LAG; 1 DNS | LAG; 2; 2 | ROA; 1; 4 | ROA; 2; 2 | ROA; 3; 2 | IMS; 1; 2 | IMS; 2; 1 | IMS; 3; 2 | MOH; 1; 1 | MOH; 2; 1 | NJM; 1 | NJM; 2 | NJM; 3 | MOS; 1 | MOS; 2 | MOS; 3 | COT; 1 | COT; 2 | 2nd | 188 |

=== American open-wheel racing results ===
==== USF Juniors ====
(key) (Races in bold indicate pole position) (Races in italics indicate fastest lap)

| Year | Team | 1 | 2 | 3 | 4 | 5 | 6 | 7 | 8 | 9 | 10 | 11 | 12 | 13 | 14 | 15 | 16 | 17 | Pos | Points |
|---|---|---|---|---|---|---|---|---|---|---|---|---|---|---|---|---|---|---|---|---|
| 2022 | Crosslink/Kiwi Motorsports | OIR; 1 | OIR; 2 | OIR; 3 | ALA; 1 | ALA; 2 | VIR; 1; 16 | VIR; 2; 8 | VIR; 3; 11 | MOH; 1 | MOH; 2 | MOH; 3 | ROA; 1 | ROA; 2 | ROA; 3 | COA; 1; 5 | COA; 2; 9 | COA; 3; 6 | 16th | 72 |
