= Mac Clark =

Canadian racing driver (born 2004)

- Nationality: (Canada) Canadian
- Born: Mackenzie Clark; 26 March 2004 (age 22) Campbellville, Ontario, Canada

USF Pro 2000 Championship career
- Debut season: 2023
- Current team: Exclusive Autosport
- Car number: 90
- Former teams: DEForce Racing
- Starts: 18
- Wins: 0
- Podiums: 2
- Poles: 1
- Fastest laps: 2
- Best finish: 11th in 2024

Previous series
- 2022–23 2022 2022 2022 2021 2021 2019–20: USF2000 Championship; USF Juniors; Formula Regional Americas Championship; YACademy Winter Series; Formula 4 United States Championship; F2000 Championship Series; Toyo Tires F1600 Championship Series - Class A

Championship titles
- 2022 2020: USF Juniors; Toyo Tires F1600 Championship Series - Class A

Mackenzie "Mac" Clark (born 26 March 2004) is a Canadian racing driver. He currently competes in the USF Pro 2000 Championship driving for Exclusive Autosport. Clark previously drove for DEForce Racing in the 2024 USF Pro 2000 Championship. He is the 2022 USF Juniors champion.

== Career ==
=== Toyo Tires F1600 Championship Series ===
In 2019, Clark would debut in the Ontario-based Toyo Tires F1600 Championship Series for Brian Graham Racing. He would finish on the podium twice during the season and ultimately finished fourth in the championship.

Clark would return to the championship in 2020, however, he would switch to Britain West Motorsport for the season. He would manage to win fourteen out of the fifteen races in the season, getting fourteen podiums, four poles, and ten fastest laps, thus winning the championship. Clark became the youngest Canadian to ever win the F1600 Championship at 16 years old; this meant he beat the long-standing record held by fellow Canadian Paul Tracy.

=== Formula 4 United States Championship ===
On the 15th of February 2021, it was announced that Clark would race in the 2021 Formula 4 United States Championship for Gonella Racing. He would take eleven podiums and six wins during the season finishing second in the championship behind Noel León.

=== USF Juniors ===
On the 8th of February 2022, it was announced that Clark would race in the inaugural season of USF Juniors in 2022 driving for DEForce Racing. At the opening round held at Ozarks International Raceway, he would grab two wins in both races. Clark managed to sweep the first two rounds of the championship, taking four poles and four wins in a row. He would go en route to win the championship taking five wins, ten poles, and twelve podiums.

=== Formula Regional Americas Championship ===
Clark would run a duel program in 2022 where he would compete in both USF Juniors and the Formula Regional Americas Championship. He would manage to win on his debut at NOLA Motorsports Park, however that would be his only win of the season.

=== USF2000 Championship ===
==== 2022 ====
After a seat at DEForce Racing was left vacant by Bijoy Garg for the final three races at Portland International Raceway, Clark would make his debut in the series. In the second race at Portland, 2022 USF2000 title rivals Myles Rowe and Jace Denmark collided at turn one allowing Clark to take the lead. He would go on to win the race in only his second start.

==== 2023 ====
Clark would step up to the series full-time for the 2023 season once again racing with DEForce Racing. He would take his first pole at Indianapolis Raceway Park and went on to win the race.

== Karting record ==
=== Karting career summary ===
Season	Series	Team	Position
2015	Canadian National Karting Championship — Junior		7th
2016	Canadian National Karting Championship — Junior		2nd
2016	Canadian National Karting Championship — Rotax Mini Max		6th
2017	SKUSA SuperNationals XXl — X30 Junior Class	Prime Power Team	70th
2018	SKUSA SuperNationals XXlI — X30 Junior Class	Prime Power Team	15th
2018	Canadian Open — Rotax Max Junior		4th
2018	ROK Cup USA ROK the RIO — Junior ROK	Prime Power Team	9th
2018	Florida Winter Tour — Junior ROK		11th
2018	SKUSA Pro Tour — X30 Junior		7th
2019	Florida Winter Tour — Junior ROK	Prime Power Team	4th

== Racing record ==
=== Racing career summary ===
Season	Series	Team	Races	Wins	Poles	F/Laps	Podiums	Points	Position
2019	Toyo Tires F1600 Championship Series - Class A	Brian Graham Racing	17	0	0	0	2	204	4th
2020	Toyo Tires F1600 Championship Series - Class A	Britain West Motorsport	15	14	4	11	14	420	**1st**
2021	Formula 4 United States Championship	Gonella Racing	17	6	2	2	11	191.5	**2nd**
2021	F2000 Championship Series	Team Pelfrey	2	2	2	2	2	110	9th
2022	USF Juniors	DEForce Racing	16	5	10	4	12	393	**1st**
2022	USF2000 Championship	DEForce Racing	3	1	0	0	1	52	22nd
2022	YACademy Winter Series	DEForce Racing	3	0	0	0	0	16	11th
2022	Formula Regional Americas Championship	Future Star Racing	15	1	0	1	3	160	6th
2023	USF2000 Championship	DEForce Racing	18	2	2	3	6	318	5th
2023	USF Pro 2000 Championship	DEForce Racing	2	0	1	2	2	50	23rd
2023	GT4 America Series - Pro-Am	Valkyrie Velocity Racing	2	0	0	0	0	14	19th
2024	USF Pro 2000 Championship	DEForce Racing	16	0	0	0	0	187	11th
2025	USF Pro 2000 Championship	Exclusive Autosport	18	0	1	0	11	346	**3rd**
2026	USF Pro 2000 Championship	Exclusive Autosport	5	0	0	0	1	61	18th

* Season still in progress.

=== Complete Toyo Tires F1600 Championship Series - Class A results ===
(key) (Races in bold indicate pole position) (Races in italics indicate fastest lap) (Races with * indicate most race laps led)

Year	Team	1	2	3	4	5	6	7	8	9	10	11	12	13	14	15	16	17	18	Rank	Points
2019	Brian Graham Racing	MSP1; 1; 14	MSP1; 2; 4	MSP1; 3; 3	CMP; 1; 4	CMP; 2; 4	CMP; 3; 6	MSP2; 1; 5	MSP2; 2; 6	MSP2; 3; 7	SMP; 1; 4	SMP; 2; 4	SMP; 3; 3	MSP3; 1; 6	MSP3; 2; 7	MSP3; 3; 11	MSP4; 1 Ret	MSP4; 2 Ret	MSP4; 3 DNS	4th	204
2020	Britain West Motorsport	MSP1; 1; 1*	MSP1; 2; 1	MSP1; 3; 1*	**MSP2**; **1**; 13	**MSP2**; **2**; 1*	**MSP2**; **3**; 1*	**SMP**; **1**; 1*	**SMP**; **2**; 1*	**SMP**; **3**; 1*	**MSP3**; **1**; 1*	**MSP3**; **2**; 1*	**MSP3**; **3**; 1*	**MSP4**; **1**; 1*	**MSP4**; **2**; 1*	**MSP4**; **3**; 1*				1st	420

=== Complete Formula 4 United States Championship results ===
(key) (Races in bold indicate pole position) (Races in italics indicate fastest lap)

Year	Team	1	2	3	4	5	6	7	8	9	10	11	12	13	14	15	16	17	DC	Points
2021	Gonella Racing	ATL; 1; 5	ATL; 2 Ret	ATL; 3; 14	**ROA**; **1**; 1	**ROA**; **2**; 1	ROA; 3; 3	MOH; 1; 1	MOH; 2; 2	MOH; 3; 1	BRA; 1; 2	BRA; 2; 1	BRA; 3; 18	VIR; 1; 21	VIR; 2; 1	VIR; 3; 3	COA; 1; 7	COA; 2; 3	2nd	191.5

=== American open-wheel racing results ===
==== USF Juniors ====
(key) (Races in bold indicate pole position) (Races in italics indicate fastest lap) (Races with * indicate most race laps led)

Year	Team	1	2	3	4	5	6	7	8	9	10	11	12	13	14	15	16	17	Rank	Points
2022	DEForce Racing	**OIR**; **1**; 1*	**OIR**; **2**; 1*	OIR; 3 C†	**ALA**; **1**; 1*	**ALA**; **2**; 1*	VIR; 1; 4	**VIR**; **2**; 10*	**VIR**; **3**; 2	**MOH**; **1**; 2*	**MOH**; **2**; 2*	**MOH**; **3**; 1*	**ROA**; **1**; 15	ROA; 2; 3	ROA; 3; 4	COA; 1; 2	COA; 2; 3	COA; 3; 3	1st	393

† Race was cancelled due to inclement weather.

==== USF2000 Championship ====
(key) (Races in bold indicate pole position) (Races in italics indicate fastest lap) (Races with * indicate most race laps led)

Year	Team	1	2	3	4	5	6	7	8	9	10	11	12	13	14	15	16	17	18	Rank	Points
2022	DEForce Racing	STP; 1	STP; 2	ALA; 1	ALA; 2	IMS; 1	IMS; 2	IMS; 3	IRP	ROA; 1	ROA; 2	MOH; 1	MOH; 2	MOH; 3	TOR; 1	TOR; 2	POR; 1; 4	POR; 2; 1*	POR; 3; 19	22nd	52
2023	DEForce Racing	STP; 1; 11	STP; 2; 20	SEB; 1; 4	SEB; 1; 2	IMS; 1; 14	IMS; 2; 4	IMS; 3; 10	**IRP**; 1*	ROA; 1; 16	**ROA**; **2**; 2	MOH; 1; 3	MOH; 2; 1	MOH; 3; 3	TOR; 1; 4	TOR; 2; 13	POR; 1; 8	POR; 2; 4	POR; 3; 9	5th	318

==== USF Pro 2000 Championship ====
(key) (Races in bold indicate pole position) (Races in italics indicate fastest lap) (Races with * indicate most race laps led)

Year	Team	1	2	3	4	5	6	7	8	9	10	11	12	13	14	15	16	17	18	Rank	Points
2023	DEForce Racing	STP; 1	STP; 2	SEB; 1	SEB; 2	IMS; 1	IMS; 2	IRP	ROA; 1	ROA; 2	MOH; 1	MOH; 2	TOR; 1	TOR; 2	**COTA**; **1**; 2	COTA; 1; 3	POR; 1	POR; 2	POR; 3	23rd	50
2024	DEForce Racing	STP; 1; 6	STP; 2; 9	LOU; 1; 5	LOU; 2; 4	LOU; 3; 5	IMS; 1; 21	IMS; 2; 18	IMS; 3; 21	IRP; 6	ROA; 1; 10	ROA; 2; 20	ROA; 3; 15	MOH; 1; 6	MOH; 2; 9	TOR; 1; 5	TOR; 2; 4	POR; 1	POR; 2	11th	187
2025	Exclusive Autosport	STP; 1; 4	STP; 2; 2	LOU; 1; 3	LOU; 2; 17	LOU; 3; 18	IMS; 1; 2	IMS; 2; 2	IMS; 3; 5	**IRP**; 3	ROA; 1; 2	ROA; 2; 3	ROA; 3; 2	MOH; 1; 10	MOH; 2; 3	TOR; 1; 3	TOR; 2; 10	POR; 1; 2	POR; 2; 12	3rd	346
2026	Exclusive Autosport	ARL; 1; 17	ARL; 2; 19	IMS; 1; 2	IMS; 2; 8	IRP; 10	ROA; 1	ROA; 2	MOH; 1	MOH; 2	MOH; 3	POR; 1	POR; 2	MAR; 1	MAR; 2	MIL	ROA; 1	ROA; 2	ROA; 3	17th*	61*
