= Ozarks International Raceway =

Race track in Gravois Mills, Missouri

- Logo of the Ozarks International Raceway

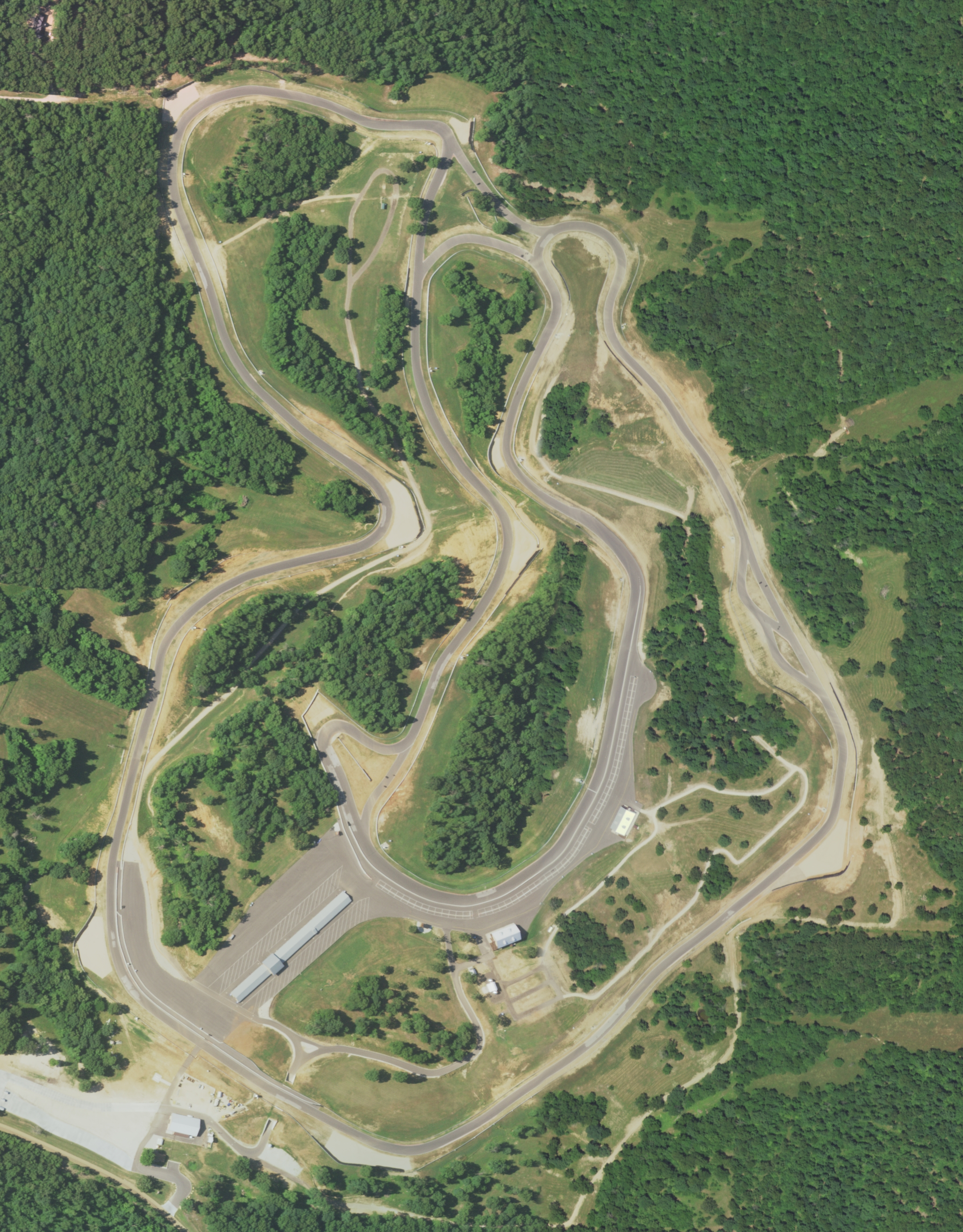
- 2022 aerial photo
- Location: 29211 Missouri Route 135, Gravois Mills, Missouri
- Coordinates: 38°16′16.43″N 92°53′24.22″W
- FIA Grade: 3
- Owner: J.R. Pesek
- Broke ground: 2020
- Opened: April 2022; 4 years ago
- Major events: Former: NASA Championships (2025); Porsche Sprint Challenge North America (2022); USF Juniors (2022)
- Website: ozarksinternationalraceway.com

Main Course (2022–present)
- Surface: Asphalt
- Length: 3.970 mi (6.389 km)
- Turns: 19
- Race lap record: 2:16.527 ( (United States) Hans Peter, Swift 016.a, 2023, Formula Atlantic)

Outer Course (2022–present)
- Length: 2.500 mi (4.023 km)
- Turns: 11

Inner Course (2022–present)
- Length: 1.400 mi (2.253 km)
- Turns: 9

Ozarks International Raceway is a multi-use race track that opened in 2022. The track has circuits for a 3.970 mi (6.389 km) paved road-course racing, off-road racing, rally, and a dirt tri-oval. It is located in 650 acres (260 ha) at 29211 Missouri Route 135, Gravois Mills, Missouri, United States, in the Lake of the Ozarks region.

== Construction ==
The raceway was the idea of race driver J.R. Pesek. Pesek was quoted by KTVI as saying, "This part of the country, I think, is kind of starving for the track." The race circuit was built in the early 2020s on the site of a closed farm named 4 J Farms. The circuit was designed to minimize its effect to the land. Pesek was quoted as saying, "The trees and designing of the racetrack, we only took down what we had to. There wasn’t many we had to take down, we’re trying to respect the environment." A 58-bay garage was constructed from repurposed turkey barns. It has a 10,000 square feet (930 m^{2}) control tower and media center. The construction utilized local labor, materials and primarily local companies.

== History ==
The track was scheduled to be open for testing and rentals in late 2021. It opened in April 2022. In its debut year, it hosted the Porsche Sprint Challenge North America Cayman cars and USF Juniors on April 22 to 24. The USF Juniors race was the series' debut; both events on the first features day (April 23) were won by Mac Clark. The second day (April 24) was rained out. The track was planned to host IMSA's Lamborghini Super Trofeo championship and SRO's GT World Challenge America championship as its first professional events on May 20 to 22. On April 27, 2022, the SRO announced that the Ozarks round in 2022 had been replaced with NOLA Motorsports Park on the same date due to the challenges related with infrastructure and supply chain.

== Tracks ==
The main track is the 17-turn 3.970 mi (6.389 km) road course. The track has 80 ft (24 m) of elevation with eight rises and drops. The road course has a 2.500 mi (4.023 km) outer and 1.400 mi (2.253 km) inner circuits via connecting routes.

== Lap records ==
As of July 2025, the fastest official race lap records at the Ozarks International Raceway are listed as:

Category	Time	Driver	Vehicle	Event
Main Course (2022–present): 3.970 mi (6.389 km)
Formula Atlantic	2:16.527	Hans Peter	Swift 016.a	2023 Ozark Lake Fest Majors
USF Juniors	2:22.170	Mac Clark	Ligier JS F4	2022 Cooper Tires Grand Prix of The Ozarks
Mustang Challenge	2:33.809	Will Lucas	Ford Mustang Dark Horse R	2025 Ozarks Mustang Cup round
GT4	2:34.178	Aidan Kenny	Porsche Cayman GT4 Clubsport	2022 Ozarks Porsche Sprint Challenge North America round
