= List of 2022 motorsport champions =

2022 motorsport champions
| Previous: 2021 | Next: 2023 |

This list of 2022 motorsport champions is a list of national or international motorsport series with championships decided by the points or positions earned by a driver from multiple races where the season was completed during the 2022 calendar year.

== Dirt oval racing ==
| Series | Champion | Refer |
|---|---|---|
| Lucas Oil Late Model Dirt Series | (United States) Tim McCreadie | |
| World of Outlaws Late Model Series | (United States) Dennis Erb Jr. | |
| World of Outlaws Sprint Car Series | (United States) Brad Sweet | |
| World of Outlaws Sprint Car Series | Teams: (United States) Kasey Kahne Racing | |

== Drag racing ==
| Series | Champion | refer |
|---|---|---|
| NHRA Camping World Drag Racing Series | Top Fuel: (United States) Brittany Force | 2022 NHRA Camping World Drag Racing Series |
| NHRA Camping World Drag Racing Series | Funny Car: (United States) Ron Capps | 2022 NHRA Camping World Drag Racing Series |
| NHRA Camping World Drag Racing Series | Pro Stock: (United States) Erica Enders | 2022 NHRA Camping World Drag Racing Series |
| NHRA Camping World Drag Racing Series | PS Motorcycle: (United States) Matt Smith | 2022 NHRA Camping World Drag Racing Series |
| European Drag Racing Championship | Top Fuel: (Finland) Antti Horto | |
| European Drag Racing Championship | Top Methanol: (Belgium) Sandro Bellio | |
| European Drag Racing Championship | Pro Stock Car: (Sweden) Jimmy Ålund | |
| European Drag Racing Championship | Pro Stock Modified: (Sweden) Jan Ericsson | |

== Drift ==
| Series | Champion | refer |
|---|---|---|
| British Drift Championship | (United Kingdom) Dylan Garvey | 2022 British Drift Championship |
| British Drift Championship | Pro-Am: (United Kingdom) Craig Macleod | 2022 British Drift Championship |
| D1 Grand Prix | (Japan) Masashi Yokoi | 2022 D1 Grand Prix series |
| D1 Grand Prix | D1 Lights: (Japan) Yuki Tano | 2022 D1 Grand Prix series |
| D1NZ | (New Zealand) Daniel Woolhouse | 2022 D1NZ season |
| D1NZ | Pro-Sport: (New Zealand) Connor Halligan | 2022 D1NZ season |
| Drift Masters | (Poland) Piotr Więcek | 2022 Drift Masters |
| Drift Masters | Nations Cup: (Republic of Ireland) Ireland | 2022 Drift Masters |
| Formula D | (Norway) Fredric Aasbø | 2022 Formula D season |
| Formula D | PROSPEC: (United States) Robert Thorne | 2022 Formula D season |
| Formula D | Manufacturers: (Japan) Toyota | 2022 Formula D season |
| Formula D | Tire Cup: (Japan) Nitto | 2022 Formula D season |

== Karting ==
| Series | Driver | Season article |
|---|---|---|
| CIK-FIA Karting World Championship | OK: (Brazil) Matheus Morgatto | |
| CIK-FIA Karting World Championship | OKJ: (Thailand) Enzo Tarnvanichkul | |
| CIK-FIA Karting World Championship | KZ: (Sweden) Viktor Gustafsson | |
| CIK-FIA Karting World Championship | KZ2: (France) Arthur Carbonnel | |
| CIK-FIA Karting Academy Trophy | (France) Arthur Dorison | 2022 CIK-FIA Karting Academy Trophy |
| CIK-FIA Karting European Championship | OK: (Japan) Kean Nakamura-Berta | |
| CIK-FIA Karting European Championship | OK-J: Anatoly Khavalkin | |
| CIK-FIA Karting European Championship | KZ: (Italy) Paolo Ippolito | |
| CIK-FIA Karting European Championship | KZ2: (France) Tom Leuillet | |
| WSK Champions Cup | KZ2: (Netherlands) Senna Van Walstijn | |
| WSK Champions Cup | OK: (Italy) Danny Carenini | |
| WSK Champions Cup | OKJ: (Peru) Andrés Cárdenas | |
| WSK Champions Cup | 60 Mini: (Spain) Christian Costoya | |
| WSK Euro Series | KZ2: (Italy) Riccardo Longhi | |
| WSK Euro Series | OK: (Japan) Kean Nakamura-Berta | |
| WSK Euro Series | OKJ: (Poland) Jan Przyrowski | |
| WSK Euro Series | 60 Mini: (Italy) Iacopo Martinese | |
| Rotax Max Challenge | DD2: (United Kingdom) Mark Kimber | |
| Rotax Max Challenge | DD2 Masters: (Latvia) Kristaps Gasparovics | |
| Rotax Max Challenge | Senior: (United Kingdom) Callum Bradshaw | |
| Rotax Max Challenge | Junior: (United Kingdom) Scott Marsh | |
| Rotax Max Challenge | Mini: (Lebanon) Christopher El Feghali | |
| Rotax Max Challenge | Micro: (Portugal) Martim Marques | |
| Rotax Max Challenge | Nations Cup: United Kingdom | |

== Motorcycle racing ==
| Series | Champion | refer |
|---|---|---|
| FIM MotoGP World Championship | (Italy) Francesco Bagnaia | 2022 MotoGP World Championship |
| FIM MotoGP World Championship | Teams: (Italy) Ducati Lenovo Team | 2022 MotoGP World Championship |
| FIM MotoGP World Championship | Constructors: (Italy) Ducati | 2022 MotoGP World Championship |
| FIM Moto2 World Championship | (Spain) Augusto Fernández | 2022 Moto2 World Championship |
| FIM Moto2 World Championship | Teams: (Finland) Red Bull KTM Ajo | 2022 Moto2 World Championship |
| FIM Moto2 World Championship | Constructors: (Germany) Kalex | 2022 Moto2 World Championship |
| FIM Moto3 World Championship | (Spain) Izan Guevara | 2022 Moto3 World Championship |
| FIM Moto3 World Championship | Teams: (Spain) GasGas Aspar Team | 2022 Moto3 World Championship |
| FIM Moto3 World Championship | Constructors: (Spain) Gas Gas | 2022 Moto3 World Championship |
| FIM MotoE World Cup | (Switzerland) Dominique Aegerter | 2022 MotoE World Cup |
| FIM CEV Moto2 European Championship | (Germany) Lukas Tulovic | 2022 FIM Moto2 European Championship |
| FIM CEV Moto2 European Championship | Constructors: (Germany) Kalex | 2022 FIM Moto2 European Championship |
| FIM CEV Moto2 European Championship | Superstock 600: (Spain) Marco Tapia | 2022 FIM Moto2 European Championship |
| FIM CEV Moto2 European Championship | Superstock 600 Constructors: (Japan) Yamaha | 2022 FIM Moto2 European Championship |
| FIM Endurance World Championship | (Australia) Joshua Hook (France) Mike Di Meglio | 2022 FIM Endurance World Championship |
| FIM Endurance World Championship | Teams: (Japan) F.C.C. TSR Honda France | 2022 FIM Endurance World Championship |
| FIM Endurance World Championship | Constructors: (Japan) Yamaha | 2022 FIM Endurance World Championship |
| FIM JuniorGP World Championship | (Spain) José Antonio Rueda | 2022 FIM JuniorGP World Championship |
| Asia Talent Cup | (Malaysia) Hakim Danish | 2022 Asia Talent Cup |
| Asia Road Racing Championship | (Malaysia) Zaqhwan Zaidi | 2022 Asia Road Racing Championship |
| Asia Road Racing Championship | Supersports 600: (Indonesia) Andi Farid Izdihar | 2022 Asia Road Racing Championship |
| Asia Road Racing Championship | Asia Production 250: (Indonesia) Andy Muhammad Fadly | 2022 Asia Road Racing Championship |
| Asia Road Racing Championship | Underbone 150: (Indonesia) Wahyu Aji Trilaksana | 2022 Asia Road Racing Championship |
| Australian Superbike Championship | (Australia) Mike Jones | 2022 Australian Superbike Championship |
| British Superbike Championship | (United Kingdom) Bradley Ray | 2022 British Superbike Championship |
| British Superbike Championship | BSB Riders Cup: (United Kingdom) Peter Hickman | 2022 British Superbike Championship |
| British Talent Cup | (United Kingdom) Johnny Garness | 2022 British Talent Cup |
| European Talent Cup | (Italy) Guido Pini | 2022 European Talent Cup |
| MotoAmerica Superbike Championship | (United States) Jake Gagne | 2022 MotoAmerica Superbike Championship |
| MotoAmerica Superbike Championship | Manufacturers: (Japan) Yamaha | 2022 MotoAmerica Superbike Championship |
| MotoAmerica Superbike Championship | Supersport: (United States) Josh Herrin | 2022 MotoAmerica Superbike Championship |
| MotoAmerica Superbike Championship | Junior: (United States) Cody Wyman | 2022 MotoAmerica Superbike Championship |
| North America Talent Cup | (United States) Alassandro DiMario | 2022 North America Talent Cup |
| Northern Talent Cup | (Hungary) Rossi Moor | 2022 Northern Talent Cup |
| Red Bull MotoGP Rookies Cup | (Spain) José Antonio Rueda | 2022 Red Bull MotoGP Rookies Cup |
| Superbike World Championship | (Spain) Álvaro Bautista | 2022 Superbike World Championship |
| Superbike World Championship | Teams: (Italy) Aruba.it Racing – Ducati | 2022 Superbike World Championship |
| Superbike World Championship | Manufacturers: (Italy) Ducati | 2022 Superbike World Championship |
| Supersport World Championship | (Switzerland) Dominique Aegerter | 2022 Supersport World Championship |
| Supersport World Championship | Manufacturers: (Japan) Yamaha | 2022 Supersport World Championship |
| Supersport 300 World Championship | (Spain) Álvaro Díaz | 2022 Supersport 300 World Championship |
| Supersport 300 World Championship | Manufacturers: (Japan) Yamaha | 2022 Supersport 300 World Championship |

=== Motocross ===
| Series | Champion | refer |
|---|---|---|
| FIM Motocross World Championship | (Slovenia) Tim Gajser | 2022 FIM Motocross World Championship |
| FIM Motocross World Championship | Manufacturers: (Japan) Yamaha | 2022 FIM Motocross World Championship |
| FIM Motocross World Championship | MX2: (France) Tom Vialle | 2022 FIM Motocross World Championship |
| FIM Motocross World Championship | MX2 Manufacturers: (Japan) Yamaha | 2022 FIM Motocross World Championship |
| FIM Women's Motocross World Championship | (Netherlands) Nancy van de Ven | 2022 FIM Women's Motocross World Championship |
| FIM Women's Motocross World Championship | Manufacturers: (Japan) Yamaha | 2022 FIM Women's Motocross World Championship |
| FIM Enduro World Championship | (Italy) Andrea Verona | 2022 FIM Enduro World Championship |
| FIM Enduro World Championship | Enduro 1: (Italy) Andrea Verona | 2022 FIM Enduro World Championship |
| FIM Enduro World Championship | Enduro 2: (Australia) Wil Ruprecht | 2022 FIM Enduro World Championship |
| FIM Enduro World Championship | Enduro 3: (United Kingdom) Brad Freeman | 2022 FIM Enduro World Championship |
| FIM Enduro World Championship | Junior: (France) Zach Pichon | 2022 FIM Enduro World Championship |
| FIM Enduro World Championship | Junior 1: (France) Zach Pichon | 2022 FIM Enduro World Championship |
| FIM Enduro World Championship | Junior 2: (France) Luc Fargier | 2022 FIM Enduro World Championship |
| FIM Enduro World Championship | Youth: (United Kingdom) Harry Edmondson | 2022 FIM Enduro World Championship |
| FIM Enduro World Championship | Women: (United Kingdom) Jane Daniels | 2022 FIM Enduro World Championship |
| FIM Enduro World Championship | Open 2-Stroke: (United Kingdom) Harry Houghton | 2022 FIM Enduro World Championship |
| FIM Enduro World Championship | Open 4-Stroke: (Portugal) Gonçalo Reis | 2022 FIM Enduro World Championship |
| FIM Sidecar Motocross World Championship | (Netherlands) Etienne Bax (Czech Republic) Ondřej Čermák | 2022 Sidecar Motocross World Championship |
| FIM Supercross World Championship | WSX: (Germany) Ken Roczen | 2022 FIM Supercross World Championship |
| FIM Supercross World Championship | WSX Manufacturers: (Japan) Honda | 2022 FIM Supercross World Championship |
| FIM Supercross World Championship | SX2: (United States) Shane McElrath | 2022 FIM Supercross World Championship |
| FIM Supercross World Championship | SX2 Manufacturers: (Japan) Honda | 2022 FIM Supercross World Championship |
| AMA Supercross Championship | 450cc: (United States) Eli Tomac | 2022 AMA Supercross Championship |
| AMA Supercross Championship | 250cc West: (United States) Christian Craig | 2022 AMA Supercross Championship |
| AMA Supercross Championship | 250cc East: (Australia) Jett Lawrence | 2022 AMA Supercross Championship |
| British Motocross Championship | MX1: (United Kingdom) Tommy Searle | 2022 British Motocross Championship |
| British Motocross Championship | MX2: (United Kingdom) Conrad Mewse | 2022 British Motocross Championship |
| European Motocross Championship | EMX250: (Netherlands) Rick Elzinga | 2022 European Motocross Championship |
| European Motocross Championship | EMX250 Manufacturers: (Japan) Yamaha | 2022 European Motocross Championship |
| European Motocross Championship | EMX125: (Netherlands) Cas Valk | 2022 European Motocross Championship |
| European Motocross Championship | EMX125 Manufacturers: (Italy) Fantic | 2022 European Motocross Championship |
| European Motocross Championship | EMXOpen: (Spain) José Butrón | 2022 European Motocross Championship |
| European Motocross Championship | EMXOpen Manufacturers: (Austria) KTM | 2022 European Motocross Championship |
| European Motocross Championship | EMX2T: (Latvia) Toms Macuks | 2022 European Motocross Championship |
| European Motocross Championship | EMX2T Manufacturers: (Austria) KTM | 2022 European Motocross Championship |
| European Motocross Championship | EMX85: (Czech Republic) Vítězslav Marek | 2022 European Motocross Championship |
| European Motocross Championship | EMX65: (Austria) Ricardo Bauer | 2022 European Motocross Championship |

=== Rally raid ===
| Series | Champion | refer |
|---|---|---|
| FIM Bajas World Cup | Motorbikes: (Poland) Konrad Dąbrowski | 2022 FIM Bajas World Cup |
| FIM Bajas World Cup | Manufacturers: (Austria) KTM | 2022 FIM Bajas World Cup |
| FIM Bajas World Cup | Quads: (Saudi Arabia) Abdalmajeed Al-Khulaifi | 2022 FIM Bajas World Cup |
| FIM Bajas World Cup | Women: (Netherlands) Mirjam Pol | 2022 FIM Bajas World Cup |
| FIM Bajas World Cup | Junior: (Poland) Konrad Dąbrowski | 2022 FIM Bajas World Cup |
| FIM Bajas World Cup | Veteran: (Portugal) Pedro Bianchi Prata | 2022 FIM Bajas World Cup |
| FIM Bajas World Cup | SSVs: (Italy) Davide Catania; SSVs: (Portugal) Carlos Paulino | 2022 FIM Bajas World Cup |

== Open wheel racing ==
| Series | Champion | refer |
|---|---|---|
| FIA Formula One World Championship | (Netherlands) Max Verstappen | 2022 Formula One World Championship |
| FIA Formula One World Championship | Constructors: (Austria) Red Bull Racing-RBPT | 2022 Formula One World Championship |
| FIA Formula E Championship | (Belgium) Stoffel Vandoorne | 2021–22 Formula E Championship |
| FIA Formula E Championship | Teams: (Germany) Mercedes-EQ Formula E Team | 2021–22 Formula E Championship |
| FIA Formula 2 Championship | (Brazil) Felipe Drugovich | 2022 Formula 2 Championship |
| FIA Formula 2 Championship | Teams: (Netherlands) MP Motorsport | 2022 Formula 2 Championship |
| Indian Racing League | (India) Akhil Rabindra | 2022 Indian Racing League |
| Indian Racing League | Teams: (India) Godspeed Kochi | 2022 Indian Racing League |
| IndyCar Series | (Australia) Will Power | 2022 IndyCar Series |
| IndyCar Series | Manufacturers: (United States) Chevrolet | 2022 IndyCar Series |
| IndyCar Series | Rookies: (Denmark) Christian Lundgaard | 2022 IndyCar Series |
| Indy Lights | (Sweden) Linus Lundqvist | 2022 Indy Lights |
| Indy Lights | Teams: (United States) Andretti Autosport | 2022 Indy Lights |
| Indy Pro 2000 Championship | (United Kingdom) Louis Foster | 2022 Indy Pro 2000 Championship |
| Indy Pro 2000 Championship | Teams: (United States) Juncos Hollinger Racing | 2022 Indy Pro 2000 Championship |
| BOSS GP Series | (Austria) Ingo Gerstl | 2022 BOSS GP Series |
| BOSS GP Series | Open: (Latvia) Harald Schlegelmilch | 2022 BOSS GP Series |
| BOSS GP Series | Formula: (Italy) Simone Colombo | 2022 BOSS GP Series |
| BOSS GP Series | Super Lights: (Austria) Andreas Hasler | 2022 BOSS GP Series |
| Atlantic Championship Series | (United States) Keith Grant | 2022 Atlantic Championship |
| MRF Formula 2000 | (India) Sai Sanjay | 2022–23 MRF Formula 2000 season |
| Formula Academy Finland | (Finland) Aleksi Jalava | 2022 Formula Academy Finland |
| Fórmula Nacional Argentina | (Argentina) Tiago Pernía | 2022 Fórmula Nacional Argentina |
| Formula Nordic | (Sweden) Philip Victorsson | 2022 Formula Nordic |
| F2000 Italian Formula Trophy | (Serbia) Paolo Brajnik | 2022 F2000 Italian Formula Trophy |
| F2000 Italian Formula Trophy | Teams: (Serbia) ASU NV Racing | 2022 F2000 Italian Formula Trophy |
| S5000 Australian Drivers' Championship | (Australia) Joey Mawson | 2022 S5000 Australian Drivers' Championship |
| S5000 Tasman Series | (Australia) Nathan Herne | 2022 S5000 Tasman Series |
| Super Formula Championship | (Japan) Tomoki Nojiri | 2022 Super Formula Championship |
| Super Formula Championship | Teams: (Japan) Team Mugen | 2022 Super Formula Championship |
| FIA Masters Historic Formula One Championship | Fittipaldi/Stewart: (France) Patrick d’Aubreby | 2022 FIA Masters Historic Formula One Championship |
| FIA Masters Historic Formula One Championship | Head/Lauda: (United Kingdom) Steve Hartley | 2022 FIA Masters Historic Formula One Championship |
| U.S. F2000 National Championship | (United States) Michael d'Orlando | 2022 U.S. F2000 National Championship |
| U.S. F2000 National Championship | Teams: (United States) Pabst Racing | 2022 U.S. F2000 National Championship |
| USF Juniors | (Canada) Mac Clark | 2022 USF Juniors |
Formula 3
| FIA Formula 3 Championship | (France) Victor Martins | 2022 FIA Formula 3 Championship |
| FIA Formula 3 Championship | Teams: (Italy) Prema Racing | 2022 FIA Formula 3 Championship |
| Australian Formula 3 | (Australia) Noah Sands | 2022 Australian Formula 3 Championship |
| Australian Formula 3 | National: (Australia) Roman Krumins | 2022 Australian Formula 3 Championship |
| Drexler-Automotive Formula 3 Cup | (Switzerland) Sandro Zeller | 2022 Drexler-Automotive Formula 3 Cup |
| Drexler-Automotive Formula 3 Cup | Open: (Hungary) Benjamin Berta | 2022 Drexler-Automotive Formula 3 Cup |
| Drexler-Automotive Formula 3 Cup | Formula Renault: (Austria) Dr. Norbert Groer | 2022 Drexler-Automotive Formula 3 Cup |
| Drexler-Automotive Formula 3 Cup | Formula 4: (Hungary) Zeno Kovacs | 2022 Drexler-Automotive Formula 3 Cup |
| Euroformula Open Championship | (Denmark) Oliver Goethe | 2022 Euroformula Open Championship |
| Euroformula Open Championship | Teams: (Japan) CryptoTower Racing | 2022 Euroformula Open Championship |
| Euroformula Open Championship | Rookies: (France) Vladislav Lomko | 2022 Euroformula Open Championship |
| Formula Regional Americas Championship | (South Africa) Raoul Hyman | 2022 Formula Regional Americas Championship |
| Formula Regional Americas Championship | Teams: (United States) (Australia) TJ Speed Motorsports | 2022 Formula Regional Americas Championship |
| Formula Regional Asian Championship | (Monaco) Arthur Leclerc | 2022 Formula Regional Asian Championship |
| Formula Regional Asian Championship | Teams: Mumbai Falcons India Racing | 2022 Formula Regional Asian Championship |
| Formula Regional Asian Championship | Rookies: (Spain) Pepe Martí | 2022 Formula Regional Asian Championship |
| Formula Regional Asian Championship | Masters: (United Arab Emirates) Khaled Al Qubaisi | 2022 Formula Regional Asian Championship |
| Formula Regional European Championship | (Sweden) Dino Beganovic | 2022 Formula Regional European Championship |
| Formula Regional European Championship | Teams: (Italy) Prema Racing | 2022 Formula Regional European Championship |
| Formula Regional Japanese Championship | (Japan) Miki Koyama | 2022 Formula Regional Japanese Championship |
| Formula Regional Japanese Championship | Teams: (Japan) Super License | 2022 Formula Regional Japanese Championship |
| Formula Regional Japanese Championship | Masters: (Japan) "Hirobon" | 2022 Formula Regional Japanese Championship |
| GB3 Championship | (United Kingdom) Luke Browning | 2022 GB3 Championship |
| GB3 Championship | Teams: (United Kingdom) Hitech Grand Prix | 2022 GB3 Championship |
| Super Formula Lights | (Japan) Kazuto Kotaka | 2022 Super Formula Lights |
| Super Formula Lights | Teams: (Japan) TOM'S | 2022 Super Formula Lights |
| Super Formula Lights | Manufacturers: (Japan) TOM'S | 2022 Super Formula Lights |
| Super Formula Lights | Masters: (Japan) Nobuhiro Imada | 2022 Super Formula Lights |
| W Series | (United Kingdom) Jamie Chadwick | 2022 W Series |
Formula 4
| ADAC Formula 4 Championship | (Italy) Andrea Kimi Antonelli | 2022 ADAC Formula 4 Championship |
| ADAC Formula 4 Championship | Teams: (Italy) Prema Racing | 2022 ADAC Formula 4 Championship |
| ADAC Formula 4 Championship | Rookies: (Brazil) Rafael Câmara | 2022 ADAC Formula 4 Championship |
| F4 Brazilian Championship | (Brazil) Pedro Clerot | 2022 F4 Brazilian Championship |
| F4 Brazilian Championship | Teams: (Brazil) Full Time Sports | 2022 F4 Brazilian Championship |
| F4 British Championship | (Republic of Ireland) Alex Dunne | 2022 F4 British Championship |
| F4 British Championship | Teams: (United Kingdom) Carlin | 2022 F4 British Championship |
| F4 British Championship | Rookies: (United States) Ugo Ugochukwu | 2022 F4 British Championship |
| F4 Chinese Championship | (China) Gerrard Xie | 2022 F4 Chinese Championship |
| F4 Chinese Championship | Teams: (China) Smart Life Racing Team | 2022 F4 Chinese Championship |
| F4 Danish Championship | (Denmark) Julius Dinesen | 2022 F4 Danish Championship |
| F4 Danish Championship | Rookies: (Denmark) Julius Dinesen | 2022 F4 Danish Championship |
| F4 Danish Championship | Formula 5: (Denmark) Mads Hoe | 2022 F4 Danish Championship |
| French F4 Championship | (France) Alessandro Giusti | 2022 French F4 Championship |
| GB4 Championship | (United Kingdom) Nikolas Taylor | 2022 GB4 Championship |
| Italian F4 Championship | (Italy) Andrea Kimi Antonelli | 2022 Italian F4 Championship |
| Italian F4 Championship | Teams: (Italy) Prema Racing | 2022 Italian F4 Championship |
| Italian F4 Championship | Rookies: (Italy) Andrea Kimi Antonelli | 2022 Italian F4 Championship |
| Italian F4 Championship | Women: (Spain) Maya Weug | 2022 Italian F4 Championship |
| F4 Japanese Championship | (Japan) Syun Koide | 2022 F4 Japanese Championship |
| F4 Japanese Championship | Teams: (Japan) Honda Formula Dream Project | 2022 F4 Japanese Championship |
| NACAM Formula 4 Championship | (Colombia) Juan Felipe Pedraza | 2022 NACAM Formula 4 Championship |
| F4 Spanish Championship | (Bulgaria) Nikola Tsolov | 2022 F4 Spanish Championship |
| F4 Spanish Championship | Teams: (Spain) Campos Racing | 2022 F4 Spanish Championship |
| F4 Spanish Championship | Rookies: (Bulgaria) Nikola Tsolov | 2022 F4 Spanish Championship |
| Formula 4 UAE Championship | (Austria) Charlie Wurz | 2022 Formula 4 UAE Championship |
| Formula 4 UAE Championship | Teams: (Italy) Prema Racing | 2022 Formula 4 UAE Championship |
| Formula 4 UAE Championship | Rookies: (Brazil) Rafael Câmara | 2022 Formula 4 UAE Championship |
| Formula 4 United States Championship | (Australia) Lochie Hughes | 2022 Formula 4 United States Championship |
| Formula 4 United States Championship | Teams: (United States) Crosslink/Kiwi Motorsport | 2022 Formula 4 United States Championship |
| JAF Japan Formula 4 | (Japan) Itsuki Sato | 2022 JAF Japan Formula 4 |
Formula Ford
| Australian Formula Ford Championship | (Australia) Valentino Astuti | 2022 Australian Formula Ford Championship |
| F1600 Championship Series | (United States) Thomas Schrage | 2022 F1600 Championship Series |
| F2000 Championship Series | (Canada) JC Trahan | 2022 F2000 Championship Series |
| Pacific F2000 Championship | (United States) Troy Shooter | 2022 Pacific F2000 Championship |
| New Zealand Formula Ford Championship | (New Zealand) Alex Crosbie | 2021–22 New Zealand Formula Ford Championship |
| Toyo Tires F1600 Championship Series | (Canada) Jake Cowden | 2022 Toyo Tires F1600 Championship Series |
Other junior formulae
| Chilean Formula Three Championship | (Chile) Giuseppe Bacigalupo | 2022 Chilean Formula Three Championship |

== Rally ==
| Series | Champion | refer |
|---|---|---|
| FIA World Rally Championship | (Finland) Kalle Rovanperä | 2022 World Rally Championship |
| FIA World Rally Championship | Co-Driver: (Finland) Jonne Halttunen | 2022 World Rally Championship |
| FIA World Rally Championship | Manufacturers: (Japan) Toyota Gazoo Racing WRT | 2022 World Rally Championship |
| FIA World Rally Championship-2 | (Finland) Emil Lindholm | 2022 World Rally Championship-2 |
| FIA World Rally Championship-2 | Co-Driver: (Finland) Reeta Hämäläinen | 2022 World Rally Championship-2 |
| FIA World Rally Championship-2 | Teams: (Germany) Toksport WRT | 2022 World Rally Championship-2 |
| FIA World Rally Championship-2 | Junior: (Finland) Emil Lindholm | 2022 World Rally Championship-2 |
| FIA World Rally Championship-2 | Junior Co-Driver: (Republic of Ireland) James Fulton | 2022 World Rally Championship-2 |
| FIA World Rally Championship-2 | Masters: (Italy) Mauro Miele | 2022 World Rally Championship-2 |
| FIA World Rally Championship-2 | Masters Co-Driver: (France) Laurent Magat | 2022 World Rally Championship-2 |
| FIA World Rally Championship-3 | (Finland) Lauri Joona | 2022 World Rally Championship-3 |
| FIA World Rally Championship-3 | Co-Driver: (Finland) Enni Mälkönen | 2022 World Rally Championship-3 |
| FIA World Rally Championship-3 | Junior: (Estonia) Robert Virves | 2022 World Rally Championship-3 |
| FIA World Rally Championship-3 | Junior Co-Driver: (Republic of Ireland) Brian Hoy | 2022 World Rally Championship-3 |
| African Rally Championship | (Zambia) Leeroy Gomes | 2022 African Rally Championship |
| African Rally Championship | Co-Drivers: (Zambia) Urshlla Gomes | 2022 African Rally Championship |
| Asia-Pacific Rally Championship | (New Zealand) Hayden Paddon | 2022 Asia-Pacific Rally Championship |
| Asia-Pacific Rally Championship | Co-Drivers: (New Zealand) John Kennard | 2022 Asia-Pacific Rally Championship |
| Australian Rally Championship | (Australia) Lewis Bates | 2022 Australian Rally Championship |
| Australian Rally Championship | Co-Drivers: (Australia) Anthony McLoughlin | 2022 Australian Rally Championship |
| British Rally Championship | (United Kingdom) Osian Pryce | 2022 British Rally Championship |
| British Rally Championship | Co-Drivers: (Republic of Ireland) Noel O'Sullivan | 2022 British Rally Championship |
| British Rally Championship | Teams: (United Kingdom) Melvyn Evans Motorsport | 2022 British Rally Championship |
| British Rally Championship | Junior: (Republic of Ireland) Eamonn Kelly | 2022 British Rally Championship |
| British Rally Championship | Junior Co-Drivers: (Republic of Ireland) Conor Mohan | 2022 British Rally Championship |
| Canadian Rally Championship | (Canada) Jerome Mailloux | 2022 Canadian Rally Championship |
| Canadian Rally Championship | Co-Drivers: (Canada) Philippe Poirier | 2022 Canadian Rally Championship |
| Central European Zone Rally Championship | Class 2: (Poland) Grzegorz Grzyb | 2022 Central European Zone Rally Championship |
| Central European Zone Rally Championship | Production: (Slovakia) Vlastimil Majerčák | 2022 Central European Zone Rally Championship |
| Central European Zone Rally Championship | 2WD: (Croatia) Viliam Prodan | 2022 Central European Zone Rally Championship |
| Central European Zone Rally Championship | Historic: (Hungary) Tibor Érdi Jr. | 2022 Central European Zone Rally Championship |
| Codasur South American Rally Championship | (Paraguay) Gustavo Saba | |
| Czech Rally Championship | (Czech Republic) Jan Kopecký | 2022 Czech Rally Championship |
| Czech Rally Championship | Co-Drivers: (Czech Republic) Jan Hloušek | 2022 Czech Rally Championship |
| Deutsche Rallye Meisterschaft | (Germany) Philip Geipel | |
| Estonian Rally Championship | (Estonia) Gregor Jeets | 2022 Estonian Rally Championship |
| Estonian Rally Championship | Co-Drivers: (Estonia) Timo Taniel | 2022 Estonian Rally Championship |
| European Rally Championship | (Spain) Efrén Llarena | 2022 European Rally Championship |
| European Rally Championship | Co-Drivers: (Spain) Sara Fernández | 2022 European Rally Championship |
| European Rally Championship | Teams: (India) Team MRF Tyres | 2022 European Rally Championship |
| European Rally Championship | ERC3: (Poland) Igor Widłak | 2022 European Rally Championship |
| European Rally Championship | ERC4: (Spain) Óscar Palomo | 2022 European Rally Championship |
| European Rally Championship | ERC4 Junior: (France) Laurent Pellier | 2022 European Rally Championship |
| European Rally Championship | ERC Open: (Andorra) Joan Vinyes | 2022 European Rally Championship |
| European Rally Championship | Clio Trophy: (Argentina) Paulo Soria | 2022 European Rally Championship |
| French Rally Championship | (France) Quentin Giordano | |
| Hungarian Rally Championship | (Norway) Mads Østberg | |
| Hungarian Rally Championship | Co-Drivers: (Sweden) Patrik Barth | |
| Indian National Rally Championship | (India) Karna Kadur | |
| Indian National Rally Championship | Co-Drivers: (India) Nikhil Pai | |
| Italian Rally Championship | (Italy) Andrea Crugnola | |
| Italian Rally Championship | Co-Drivers: (Italy) Pietro Elia Ometto | |
| Italian Rally Championship | Manufacturers: (Czech Republic) Škoda | |
| Middle East Rally Championship | (Qatar) Nasser Al-Attiyah | |
| NACAM Rally Championship | (Mexico) Ricardo Cordero Jr. | |
| New Zealand Rally Championship | (New Zealand) Hayden Paddon | 2022 New Zealand Rally Championship |
| New Zealand Rally Championship | Co-Drivers: (New Zealand) John Kennard | 2022 New Zealand Rally Championship |
| New Zealand Rally Championship | Teams: (New Zealand) Paddon Rallysport | 2022 New Zealand Rally Championship |
| New Zealand Rally Championship | Manufacturers: (South Korea) Hyundai | 2022 New Zealand Rally Championship |
| New Zealand Rally Championship | 4WD: (New Zealand) Hayden Paddon | 2022 New Zealand Rally Championship |
| New Zealand Rally Championship | 4WD Co-Drivers: (New Zealand) John Kennard | 2022 New Zealand Rally Championship |
| New Zealand Rally Championship | 2WD: (New Zealand) Dylan Thomson | 2022 New Zealand Rally Championship |
| New Zealand Rally Championship | 2WD Co-Drivers: (New Zealand) Bayden Thomson | 2022 New Zealand Rally Championship |
| New Zealand Rally Championship | Junior: (New Zealand) Ari Pettigrew | 2022 New Zealand Rally Championship |
| New Zealand Rally Championship | Rookie: (New Zealand) Jean-Paul van Der Meys | 2022 New Zealand Rally Championship |
| Polish Rally Championship | (Sweden) Tom Kristensson | |
| Romanian Rally Championship | (Romania) Simone Tempestini | |
| Scottish Rally Championship | (United Kingdom) David Bogie | 2022 Scottish Rally Championship |
| Scottish Rally Championship | Co-driver: (United Kingdom) John Rowan | 2022 Scottish Rally Championship |
| Slovak Rally Championship | (Poland) Grzegorz Grzyb | |
| Slovak Rally Championship | Co-Drivers: (Poland) Adam Binięda | |
| South African National Rally Championship | (South Africa) Chris Coertse | |
| South African National Rally Championship | Co-Drivers: (South Africa) Greg Godrich | |
| Spanish Rally Championship | (Spain) Víctor Senra | |
| Spanish Rally Championship | Co-Drivers: (Spain) David Vázquez | |

=== Rally raid ===
| Series | Champion | refer |
|---|---|---|
| FIA World Rally-Raid Championship | (Qatar) Nasser Al-Attiyah | 2022 World Rally-Raid Championship |
| FIA World Rally-Raid Championship | Co-Drivers: (France) Mathieu Baumel | 2022 World Rally-Raid Championship |
| FIA World Rally-Raid Championship | Teams: (Japan) Toyota Gazoo Racing | 2022 World Rally-Raid Championship |
| FIA World Rally-Raid Championship | T3: (Chile) Francisco López Contardo | 2022 World Rally-Raid Championship |
| FIA World Rally-Raid Championship | T3 Co-Drivers: (France) François Cazalet | 2022 World Rally-Raid Championship |
| FIA World Rally-Raid Championship | T4: (Lithuania) Rokas Baciuska | 2022 World Rally-Raid Championship |
| FIA World Rally-Raid Championship | T4 Co-Drivers: (Poland) Lukasz Laskawiec | 2022 World Rally-Raid Championship |
| FIA World Rally-Raid Championship | T5: (Netherlands) Kees Koolen | 2022 World Rally-Raid Championship |
| FIA World Rally-Raid Championship | T5 Co-Drivers: (Netherlands) Wouter De Graaff | 2022 World Rally-Raid Championship |
| FIM World Rally-Raid Championship | (United Kingdom) Sam Sunderland | 2022 World Rally-Raid Championship |
| FIM World Rally-Raid Championship | Teams: (Japan) Monster Energy Honda Team | 2022 World Rally-Raid Championship |
| FIM World Rally-Raid Championship | Rally2: (United States) Mason Klein | 2022 World Rally-Raid Championship |
| FIM World Rally-Raid Championship | Rally2 Junior: (United States) Mason Klein | 2022 World Rally-Raid Championship |
| FIM World Rally-Raid Championship | Rally3: (Morocco) Amine Echiguer | 2022 World Rally-Raid Championship |
| FIM World Rally-Raid Championship | Quad: (France) Alexandre Giroud | 2022 World Rally-Raid Championship |
| FIM World Rally-Raid Championship | Womens: (Netherlands) Mirjam Pol | 2022 World Rally-Raid Championship |
| FIM World Rally-Raid Championship | Veterans: (Portugal) Mario Patrão | 2022 World Rally-Raid Championship |
| Dakar Rally | Cars: (Qatar) Nasser Al-Attiyah; Co-driver: (France) Mathieu Baumel | 2022 Dakar Rally |
| Dakar Rally | Bikes: (United Kingdom) Sam Sunderland | 2022 Dakar Rally |
| Dakar Rally | Light Prototypes: (Chile) Francisco López Contardo; Co-driver: (Chile) Juan Pablo Latrach Vinagre | 2022 Dakar Rally |
| Dakar Rally | Quads: (France) Alexandre Giroud | 2022 Dakar Rally |
| Dakar Rally | UTV: (United States) Austin Jones; Co-driver: (Brazil) Gustavo Gugelmin | 2022 Dakar Rally |
| Dakar Rally | Trucks: Dmitry Sotnikov (Note: All the following drivers are Russian, but competed under a neutral flag as the Court of Arbitration for Sport upheld a ban on Russia competing at World Championships. The ban was implemented by the World Anti-Doping Agency in response to state-sponsored doping program of Russian athletes.); Co-driver: Ruslan Akhmadeev; Co-driver: Ilgiz Akhmetzianov | 2022 Dakar Rally |
| Dakar Rally | Classics: (France) Serge Mogno; Co-driver: (France) Florent Drulhon | 2022 Dakar Rally |
| Extreme E | (France) Sébastien Loeb (Spain) Cristina Gutiérrez | 2022 Extreme E Championship |
| Extreme E | Teams: (United Kingdom) Team X44 | 2022 Extreme E Championship |

=== Rallycross ===
| Series | Champion | refer |
|---|---|---|
| FIA World Rallycross Championship | (Sweden) Johan Kristoffersson | 2022 FIA World Rallycross Championship |
| FIA World Rallycross Championship | Teams: (Sweden) Kristoffersson Motorsport | 2022 FIA World Rallycross Championship |
| FIA World Rallycross Championship | RX2e: (Belgium) Viktor Vranckx | 2022 FIA World Rallycross Championship |
| FIA European Rallycross Championship | (Sweden) Anton Marklund | 2022 FIA European Rallycross Championship |
| FIA European Rallycross Championship | RX3: (Belgium) Kobe Pauwels | 2022 FIA European Rallycross Championship |
| British Rallycross Championship | (United Kingdom) Patrick O'Donovan | |

=== Ice racing ===
| Series | Champion | refer |
|---|---|---|
| Andros Trophy | Élite Pro: (France) Jean-Baptiste Dubourg | 2021-22 Andros Trophy |
| Andros Trophy | Teams: (France) Saintéloc Racing | 2021-22 Andros Trophy |
| Andros Trophy | Élite: (France) Jimmy Clairet | 2021-22 Andros Trophy |
| Andros Trophy | AMV Cup: (France) Vivien Gonnet | 2021-22 Andros Trophy |

== Stock car racing ==
| Series | Champion | refer |
|---|---|---|
| NASCAR Cup Series | (United States) Joey Logano | 2022 NASCAR Cup Series |
| NASCAR Cup Series | Manufacturers: (United States) Chevrolet | 2022 NASCAR Cup Series |
| NASCAR Xfinity Series | (United States) Ty Gibbs | 2022 NASCAR Xfinity Series |
| NASCAR Xfinity Series | Manufacturers: (United States) Chevrolet | 2022 NASCAR Xfinity Series |
| NASCAR Camping World Truck Series | (United States) Zane Smith | 2022 NASCAR Camping World Truck Series |
| NASCAR Camping World Truck Series | Manufacturers: (Japan) Toyota | 2022 NASCAR Camping World Truck Series |
| NASCAR Mexico Series | (Mexico) Rubén García Jr. | 2022 NASCAR Mexico Series |
| NASCAR Pinty's Series | (Canada) Marc-Antoine Camirand | 2022 NASCAR Pinty's Series |
| NASCAR Pinty's Series | Manufacturers: (United States) Chevrolet | 2022 NASCAR Pinty's Series |
| NASCAR Whelen Euro Series | (Israel) Alon Day | 2022 NASCAR Whelen Euro Series |
| NASCAR Whelen Euro Series | Teams: (Netherlands) Hendriks Motorsport | 2022 NASCAR Whelen Euro Series |
| NASCAR Whelen Euro Series | EuroNASCAR 2: (Netherlands) Liam Hezemans | 2022 NASCAR Whelen Euro Series |
| NASCAR Whelen Euro Series | Club Challenge: (United Kingdom) Gordon Barnes | 2022 NASCAR Whelen Euro Series |
| NASCAR Whelen Modified Tour | (United States) Jon McKennedy | 2022 NASCAR Whelen Modified Tour |
| ARCA Menards Series | (United States) Nick Sanchez | 2022 ARCA Menards Series |
| ARCA Menards Series East | (United States) Sammy Smith | 2022 ARCA Menards Series East |
| ARCA Menards Series West | (United States) Jake Drew | 2022 ARCA Menards Series West |
| Superstar Racing Experience | (United States) Marco Andretti | 2022 SRX Series |
| Turismo Carretera | (Argentina) José Manuel Urcera | 2022 Turismo Carretera |

== Sports car and GT ==
| Series | Champion | refer |
|---|---|---|
| FIA World Endurance Championship | (New Zealand) Brendon Hartley (Japan) Ryō Hirakawa (Switzerland) Sébastien Buemi | 2022 FIA World Endurance Championship |
| FIA World Endurance Championship | Manufacturers: (Japan) Toyota | 2022 FIA World Endurance Championship |
| FIA World Endurance Championship | GTE: (Italy) Alessandro Pier Guidi; GTE: (United Kingdom) James Calado | 2022 FIA World Endurance Championship |
| FIA World Endurance Championship | GTE Manufacturers: (Italy) Ferrari | 2022 FIA World Endurance Championship |
| FIA World Endurance Championship | LMP2: (Portugal) António Félix da Costa; LMP2: (Mexico) Roberto González; LMP2: (United Kingdom) Will Stevens | 2022 FIA World Endurance Championship |
| FIA World Endurance Championship | LMP2 Teams: (United Kingdom) Jota | 2022 FIA World Endurance Championship |
| FIA World Endurance Championship | LMP2 Pro-Am: (Italy) Alessio Rovera; LMP2 Pro-Am: (France) François Perrodo; LMP2 Pro-Am: (Denmark) Nicklas Nielsen | 2022 FIA World Endurance Championship |
| FIA World Endurance Championship | LMP2 Pro-Am Teams: (Italy) AF Corse | 2022 FIA World Endurance Championship |
| FIA World Endurance Championship | GTE Am: (United States) Ben Keating; GTE Am: (Denmark) Marco Sørensen | 2022 FIA World Endurance Championship |
| FIA World Endurance Championship | GTE Am Teams: (United Kingdom) TF Sport | 2022 FIA World Endurance Championship |
| ADAC GT Masters | (Italy) Raffaele Marciello | 2022 ADAC GT Masters |
| ADAC GT Masters | Teams: (Switzerland) Emil Frey Racing | 2022 ADAC GT Masters |
| ADAC GT Masters | Trophy: (Germany) Florian Spengler | 2022 ADAC GT Masters |
| ADAC GT Masters | Junior: (United Kingdom) Ben Green | 2022 ADAC GT Masters |
| ADAC GT4 Germany | (Germany) Mike David Ortmann (Germany) Hugo Sasse | 2022 ADAC GT4 Germany |
| ADAC GT4 Germany | Teams: (Germany) Dörr Motorsport | 2022 ADAC GT4 Germany |
| ADAC GT4 Germany | Trophy: (Luxembourg) Christian Kosch; Trophy: (Luxembourg) Tom Kieffer | 2022 ADAC GT4 Germany |
| ADAC GT4 Germany | Junior: (Germany) Hugo Sasse | 2022 ADAC GT4 Germany |
| Asian Le Mans Series | LMP2: (United Kingdom) Matt Bell; LMP2: (United Kingdom) Ben Hanley; LMP2: (United States) Rodrigo Sales | 2022 Asian Le Mans Series |
| Asian Le Mans Series | LMP2 Teams: (United Kingdom) #4 Nielsen Racing | 2022 Asian Le Mans Series |
| Asian Le Mans Series | LMP2 Am: (Switzerland) David Droux; LMP2 Am: (Switzerland) Sébastien Page; LMP2 Am: (France) Eric Trouillet | 2022 Asian Le Mans Series |
| Asian Le Mans Series | LMP2 Am Teams: (France) #39 Graff Racing | 2022 Asian Le Mans Series |
| Asian Le Mans Series | LMP3: (France) Christophe Cresp; LMP3: (France) Antoine Doquin; LMP3: (France) Steven Palette | 2022 Asian Le Mans Series |
| Asian Le Mans Series | LMP3 Teams: (Spain) #27 CD Sport | 2022 Asian Le Mans Series |
| Asian Le Mans Series | GT: (United Kingdom) Ben Barnicoat; GT: (United States) Brendan Iribe; GT: (United Kingdom) Ollie Millroy | 2022 Asian Le Mans Series |
| Asian Le Mans Series | GT Teams: (United Kingdom) #7 Inception Racing | 2022 Asian Le Mans Series |
| Asian Le Mans Series | GT Am: (Canada) Mikaël Grenier; GT Am: (United Kingdom) Ian Loggie; GT Am: (Germany) Valentin Pierburg | 2022 Asian Le Mans Series |
| Asian Le Mans Series | GT Am Teams: (Germany) #20 SPS Automotive Performance | 2022 Asian Le Mans Series |
| British Endurance Championship | Class A: (United Kingdom) Wayne Marrs; Class A: (United Kingdom) Tom Jackson | 2022 British Endurance Championship |
| British Endurance Championship | Class B: (Switzerland) Claude Bovet; Class B: (United Kingdom) David McDonald | 2022 British Endurance Championship |
| British Endurance Championship | Class C: (United Kingdom) Chris Compton-Goddard; Class C: (United Kingdom) Bradley Ellis; Class C: (United Kingdom) Charlie Hollings; Class C: (United Kingdom) Jamie Stanley | 2022 British Endurance Championship |
| British Endurance Championship | Class D: (United Kingdom) Daniel Brown; Class C: (United Kingdom) Stuart Hall; Class C: (United Kingdom) Peter Montague | 2022 British Endurance Championship |
| British Endurance Championship | Class E: (United Kingdom) Alex Day; Class E: (United Kingdom) William Foster | 2022 British Endurance Championship |
| British Endurance Championship | Class F: (United Kingdom) Jake McAleer; Class F: (United Kingdom) Mark McAleer | 2022 British Endurance Championship |
| British GT Championship | (United Kingdom) Ian Loggie | 2022 British GT Championship |
| British GT Championship | Teams: (United Kingdom) RAM Racing | 2022 British GT Championship |
| British GT Championship | Pro-Am: (United Kingdom) Ian Loggie | 2022 British GT Championship |
| British GT Championship | Silver-Am: (United Kingdom) James Dorlin; Silver-Am: (Fédération Internationale de l'Automobile) Alex Malykhin | 2022 British GT Championship |
| British GT Championship | GT4: (United Kingdom) Richard Williams; GT4: (United Kingdom) Sennan Fielding | 2022 British GT Championship |
| British GT Championship | GT4 Teams: (United Kingdom) Steller Performance | 2022 British GT Championship |
| British GT Championship | GT4 Pro-Am: (United Kingdom) Matt Topham; GT4 Pro-Am: (United Kingdom) Darren Turner | 2022 British GT Championship |
| British GT Championship | GT4 Silver: (United Kingdom) Richard Williams; GT4 Silver: (United Kingdom) Sennan Fielding | 2022 British GT Championship |
| Deutsche Tourenwagen Masters | (South Africa) Sheldon van der Linde | 2022 Deutsche Tourenwagen Masters |
| Deutsche Tourenwagen Masters | Teams: (Germany) Schubert Motorsport | 2022 Deutsche Tourenwagen Masters |
| Deutsche Tourenwagen Masters | Manufacturers: (Germany) Mercedes-AMG | 2022 Deutsche Tourenwagen Masters |
| DTM Trophy | (Germany) Tim Heinemann | 2022 DTM Trophy |
| DTM Trophy | Teams: (Germany) Project 1 | 2022 DTM Trophy |
| European Le Mans Series | LMP2: (Switzerland) Louis Delétraz; LMP2: (Austria) Ferdinand Habsburg | 2022 European Le Mans Series |
| European Le Mans Series | LMP2 Teams: (Italy) #9 Prema Racing | 2022 European Le Mans Series |
| European Le Mans Series | LMP2 Pro-Am: (Republic of Ireland) Charlie Eastwood; LMP2 Pro-Am: (Turkey) Salih Yoluç | 2022 European Le Mans Series |
| European Le Mans Series | LMP2 Pro-Am Teams: #34 Racing Team Turkey | 2022 European Le Mans Series |
| European Le Mans Series | LMP3: (United Kingdom) Mike Benham; LMP3: (Denmark) Malthe Jakobsen; LMP3: (United States) Maurice Smith | 2022 European Le Mans Series |
| European Le Mans Series | LMP3 Teams: (Switzerland) #17 Cool Racing | 2022 European Le Mans Series |
| European Le Mans Series | LMGTE: (Italy) Gianmaria Bruni; LMGTE: (Italy) Lorenzo Ferrari; LMGTE: (Germany) Christian Ried | 2022 European Le Mans Series |
| European Le Mans Series | LMGTE Teams: (Germany) #77 Proton Competition | 2022 European Le Mans Series |
| Ferrari Challenge Europe Trofeo Pirelli | (France) Doriane Pin | 2022 Ferrari Challenge Europe |
| Ferrari Challenge Europe Trofeo Pirelli | Pro-Am: (France) Ange Barde | 2022 Ferrari Challenge Europe |
| Ginetta GT4 Supercup | G56 Pro: (United Kingdom) James Kellett | 2022 Ginetta GT4 Supercup |
| Ginetta GT4 Supercup | G56 Am: (United Kingdom) Wes Pearce | 2022 Ginetta GT4 Supercup |
| Ginetta GT4 Supercup | G55 Pro: (United Kingdom) Luke Reade | 2022 Ginetta GT4 Supercup |
| Ginetta GT4 Supercup | G55 Am: (United Kingdom) Ian Duggan | 2022 Ginetta GT4 Supercup |
| Ginetta Junior Championship | (United Kingdom) Josh Rowledge | 2022 Ginetta Junior Championship |
| Ginetta Junior Championship | Teams: (United Kingdom) R Racing | 2022 Ginetta Junior Championship |
| Ginetta Junior Championship | Rookies: (United Kingdom) Will Macintyre | 2022 Ginetta Junior Championship |
| GT & Prototype Challenge | LMP3: (Luxembourg) Gary Hauser; LMP3: (Luxembourg) Lea Mauer | 2022 GT & Prototype Challenge |
| GT & Prototype Challenge | Group CN: (Belgium) Thomas Piessens; Group CN: (Belgium) Sam Dejonghe | 2022 GT & Prototype Challenge |
| GT & Prototype Challenge | Radical: (Netherlands) Melvin van Dam | 2022 GT & Prototype Challenge |
| GT America Series | SRO3: (United States) George Kurtz | 2022 GT America Series |
| GT America Series | SRO3 Teams: (United States) CrowdStrike Racing by Riley Motorsports | 2022 GT America Series |
| GT America Series | GT2: (United States) C.J. Moses | 2022 GT America Series |
| GT America Series | GT2 Teams: (United States) CrowdStrike Racing by GMG Racing | 2022 GT America Series |
| GT America Series | GT4: (United States) Ross Chouest | 2022 GT America Series |
| GT America Series | GT4 Teams: (United States) Chouest Povoledo Racing | 2022 GT America Series |
| GT Cup Open Europe | (Belgium) Jan Lauryssen | 2022 GT Cup Open Europe |
| GT Cup Open Europe | Teams: (Belgium) Q1 Trackracing | 2022 GT Cup Open Europe |
| GT Cup Open Europe | Pro-Am: (Belgium) Jan Lauryssen | 2022 GT Cup Open Europe |
| GT Cup Open Europe | Am: (Belgium) John de Wilde | 2022 GT Cup Open Europe |
| GT Cup Open Europe | Trophy Pro-Am: (France) Jahid Fazal-Karim | 2022 GT Cup Open Europe |
| GT Cup Open Europe | Trophy Am: (Italy) Fabio Fabiani | 2022 GT Cup Open Europe |
| GT World Challenge America | (Italy) Andrea Caldarelli | 2022 GT World Challenge America |
| GT World Challenge America | Teams: (United States) K-PAX Racing | 2022 GT World Challenge America |
| GT World Challenge America | Pro-Am: (Germany) Mario Farnbacher; Pro-Am: (United States) Ashton Harrison | 2022 GT World Challenge America |
| GT World Challenge America | Pro-Am Teams: (United States) Racers Edge Motorsports | 2022 GT World Challenge America |
| GT World Challenge America | Am: (United States) Charlie Scardina; Am: (United States) Onofrio Triarsi | 2022 GT World Challenge America |
| GT World Challenge America | Am Teams: (United States) Triarsi Competizione | 2022 GT World Challenge America |
| GT World Challenge Asia | (Japan) Kei Cozzolino (Japan) Takeshi Kimura | 2022 GT World Challenge Asia |
| GT World Challenge Asia | Teams: (Australia) Triple Eight JMR | 2022 GT World Challenge Asia |
| GT World Challenge Asia | GT4: (Taiwan) Brian Lee; GT4: (Japan) Hideto Yasuoka | 2022 GT World Challenge Asia |
| GT World Challenge Asia | GT4 Teams: (Japan) GTO Racing Team | 2022 GT World Challenge Asia |
| GT World Challenge Asia | GTC: (Japan) "Bankcy"; GTC: (Japan) Shinji Takei | 2022 GT World Challenge Asia |
| GT World Challenge Asia | Pro-Am: (Australia) Nick Foster; Pro-Am: (Malaysia) Prince Jefri Ibrahim | 2022 GT World Challenge Asia |
| GT World Challenge Asia | Silver Cup: (Japan) Naoki Yokomizo | 2022 GT World Challenge Asia |
| GT World Challenge Asia | Silver-Am Cup: (Taiwan) Brian Lee; Silver-Am Cup: (Japan) Hideto Yasuoka | 2022 GT World Challenge Asia |
| GT World Challenge Asia | GT3 Am: (Australia) Andrew Macpherson; GT3 Am: (Australia) Ben Porter | 2022 GT World Challenge Asia |
| GT World Challenge Asia | GTC Am: (Japan) "Bankcy"; GTC Am: (Japan) Shinji Takei | 2022 GT World Challenge Asia |
| GT World Challenge Asia | GT4 Am: (Japan) Masayoshi Oyama | 2022 GT World Challenge Asia |
| GT World Challenge Australia | (Australia) Yasser Shahin | 2022 GT World Challenge Australia |
| GT World Challenge Australia | Am: (Australia) Gary Higgon; Am: (Australia) Paul Stokell | 2022 GT World Challenge Australia |
| GT World Challenge Australia | GT Trophy: (Australia) Michael Kokkinos | 2022 GT World Challenge Australia |
| GT World Challenge Australia | GT4: (Australia) Mark Griffith | 2022 GT World Challenge Australia |
| GT World Challenge Europe | (Switzerland) Raffaele Marciello | 2022 GT World Challenge Europe |
| GT World Challenge Europe | Teams: (France) AKKodis ASP Team | 2022 GT World Challenge Europe |
| GT World Challenge Europe | Pro-Am: (Portugal) Miguel Ramos | 2022 GT World Challenge Europe |
| GT World Challenge Europe | Pro-Am Teams: (Italy) AF Corse | 2022 GT World Challenge Europe |
| GT World Challenge Europe | Silver Cup: (France) Thomas Neubauer; Silver Cup: (Denmark) Benjamin Goethe | 2022 GT World Challenge Europe |
| GT World Challenge Europe | Silver Cup Teams: (United Kingdom) ROFGO Racing with Team WRT | 2022 GT World Challenge Europe |
| GT World Challenge Europe Endurance Cup | (Switzerland) Raffaele Marciello (France) Jules Gounon (Spain) Daniel Juncadella | 2022 GT World Challenge Europe Endurance Cup |
| GT World Challenge Europe Endurance Cup | Teams: (France) AKKodis ASP Team | 2022 GT World Challenge Europe Endurance Cup |
| GT World Challenge Europe Endurance Cup | Pro-Am: (Italy) Andrea Bertolini; Pro-Am: (Italy) Stefano Costantini; Pro-Am: (Belgium) Louis Machiels | 2022 GT World Challenge Europe Endurance Cup |
| GT World Challenge Europe Endurance Cup | Pro-Am Teams: (Germany) SPS Automotive Performance | 2022 GT World Challenge Europe Endurance Cup |
| GT World Challenge Europe Endurance Cup | Silver Cup: (France) Thomas Neubauer; Silver Cup: (Denmark) Benjamin Goethe; Silver Cup: (France) Jean-Baptiste Simmenauer | 2022 GT World Challenge Europe Endurance Cup |
| GT World Challenge Europe Endurance Cup | Silver Cup Teams: (United Kingdom) ROFGO Racing with Team WRT | 2022 GT World Challenge Europe Endurance Cup |
| GT World Challenge Europe Endurance Cup | Bronze Cup: (Saudi Arabia) Reema Juffali; Bronze Cup: (United States) George Kurtz; Bronze Cup: (Germany) Tim Müller; Bronze Cup: (Germany) Valentin Pierburg | 2022 GT World Challenge Europe Endurance Cup |
| GT World Challenge Europe Endurance Cup | Bronze Cup Teams: (Germany) SPS Automotive Performance | 2022 GT World Challenge Europe Endurance Cup |
| GT World Challenge Europe Endurance Cup | Gold Cup: (United States) Brendan Iribe; Gold Cup: (United Kingdom) Ollie Millroy; Gold Cup: (Denmark) Frederik Schandorff | 2022 GT World Challenge Europe Endurance Cup |
| GT World Challenge Europe Endurance Cup | Gold Cup Teams: (United Kingdom) Inception Racing with Optimum Motorsport | 2022 GT World Challenge Europe Endurance Cup |
| GT World Challenge Europe Sprint Cup | (Belgium) Dries Vanthoor (Belgium) Charles Weerts | 2022 GT World Challenge Europe Sprint Cup |
| GT World Challenge Europe Sprint Cup | Teams: (Belgium) Belgian Audi Club Team WRT | 2022 GT World Challenge Europe Sprint Cup |
| GT World Challenge Europe Sprint Cup | Pro-Am: (Portugal) Miguel Ramos; Pro-Am: (United Kingdom) Dean MacDonald | 2022 GT World Challenge Europe Sprint Cup |
| GT World Challenge Europe Sprint Cup | Pro-Am Teams: (Italy) AF Corse | 2022 GT World Challenge Europe Sprint Cup |
| GT World Challenge Europe Sprint Cup | Silver Cup: (France) Pierre-Alexandre Jean; Silver Cup: (Belgium) Ulysse De Pauw | 2022 GT World Challenge Europe Sprint Cup |
| GT World Challenge Europe Sprint Cup | Silver Cup Teams: (Italy) AF Corse | 2022 GT World Challenge Europe Sprint Cup |
| GT America Series | Silver Cup: (United States) Eric Filguieras; Silver Cup: (United Kingdom) Stevan McAleer | 2022 GT America Series |
| GT America Series | Teams: (United States) RS1 | 2022 GT America Series |
| GT America Series | Pro-Am: (United States) Jason Hart; Pro-Am: (United States) Scott Noble | 2022 GT America Series |
| GT America Series | Pro-Am Teams: (United States) NOLASPORT | 2022 GT America Series |
| GT America Series | Am: (United States) James Clay; Am: (United States) Charlie Postins | 2022 GT America Series |
| GT America Series | Am Teams: (United States) Bimmerworld Racing | 2022 GT America Series |
| GT2 European Series | Pro-Am: (Belgium) Stienes Longin; Pro-Am: (Belgium) Nicolas Saelens | 2022 GT2 European Series |
| GT2 European Series | Am: (France) Henry Hassid | 2022 GT2 European Series |
| GT4 European Series | Silver Cup: (Israel) Roee Meyuhas; Silver Cup: (France) Erwan Bastard | 2022 GT4 European Series |
| GT4 European Series | Silver Cup Teams: (France) Saintéloc Racing | 2022 GT4 European Series |
| GT4 European Series | Pro-Am: (France) Jean Luc Beaubelique; Pro-Am: (France) Jim Pla | 2022 GT4 European Series |
| GT4 European Series | Pro-Am Teams: (France) AKKodis ASP Team | 2022 GT4 European Series |
| GT4 European Series | Am: (Fédération Internationale de l'Automobile) Mikhail Loboda; Am: (Fédération Internationale de l'Automobile) Andrey Solukvtsev | 2022 GT4 European Series |
| GT4 European Series | Am Teams: (France) AKKodis ASP Team | 2022 GT4 European Series |
| IMSA Prototype Challenge | (Estonia) Tõnis Kasemets | 2022 IMSA Prototype Challenge |
| IMSA Prototype Challenge | Teams: (United States) #60 Wulver Racing | 2022 IMSA Prototype Challenge |
| IMSA Prototype Challenge | Bronze: (Estonia) Tõnis Kasemets | 2022 IMSA Prototype Challenge |
| IMSA SportsCar Championship | DPi: (United Kingdom) Oliver Jarvis; DPi: (United Kingdom) Tom Blomqvist | 2022 IMSA SportsCar Championship |
| IMSA SportsCar Championship | DPi Teams: (United States) #60 Meyer Shank Racing w/ Curb-Agajanian | 2022 IMSA SportsCar Championship |
| IMSA SportsCar Championship | DPi Manufacturers: (Japan) Acura | 2022 IMSA SportsCar Championship |
| IMSA SportsCar Championship | LMP2: (Canada) John Farano | 2022 IMSA SportsCar Championship |
| IMSA SportsCar Championship | LMP2 Teams: (United States) #8 Tower Motorsport | 2022 IMSA SportsCar Championship |
| IMSA SportsCar Championship | LMP3: (United States) Jon Bennett; LMP3: (United States) Colin Braun | 2022 IMSA SportsCar Championship |
| IMSA SportsCar Championship | LMP3 Teams: (United States) #54 CORE Autosport | 2022 IMSA SportsCar Championship |
| IMSA SportsCar Championship | GTD Pro: (France) Mathieu Jaminet; GTD Pro: (Australia) Matt Campbell | 2022 IMSA SportsCar Championship |
| IMSA SportsCar Championship | GTD Pro Teams: (United States) #9 Pfaff Motorsports | 2022 IMSA SportsCar Championship |
| IMSA SportsCar Championship | GTD Pro Manufacturers: (Germany) Porsche | 2022 IMSA SportsCar Championship |
| IMSA SportsCar Championship | GTD: (Canada) Roman De Angelis | 2022 IMSA SportsCar Championship |
| IMSA SportsCar Championship | GTD Teams: (United States) #27 Heart of Racing Team | 2022 IMSA SportsCar Championship |
| IMSA SportsCar Championship | GTD Manufacturers: (Germany) BMW | 2022 IMSA SportsCar Championship |
| Intercontinental GT Challenge | (Spain) Daniel Juncadella | 2022 Intercontinental GT Challenge |
| Intercontinental GT Challenge | Manufacturers: (Germany) Mercedes-AMG | 2022 Intercontinental GT Challenge |
| Intercontinental GT Challenge | Pro-Am: (Australia) Kenny Habul; Pro-Am: (Austria) Martin Konrad | 2022 Intercontinental GT Challenge |
| Le Mans Cup | LMP3: (Germany) Alexander Mattschull; LMP3: (France) Tom Dillmann | 2022 Le Mans Cup |
| Le Mans Cup | LMP3 Teams: (Switzerland) #10 Racing Spirit of Léman | 2022 Le Mans Cup |
| Le Mans Cup | GT3: (Denmark) Kasper H. Jensen; GT3: (Denmark) Kristian Poulsen | 2022 Le Mans Cup |
| Le Mans Cup | GT3 Teams: (Denmark) #55 GMB Motorsport | 2022 Le Mans Cup |
| Ligier European Series | JS P4: (France) Gillian Henrion | 2022 Ligier European Series |
| Ligier European Series | JS P4 Teams: (Poland) #16 Team Virage | 2022 Ligier European Series |
| Ligier European Series | JS P2: (Kuwait) Haytham Qarajouli | 2022 Ligier European Series |
| Ligier European Series | JS P2 Teams: (United Kingdom) #75 RLR MSport | 2022 Ligier European Series |
| Mazda MX-5 Cup | (United States) Jared Thomas | 2022 Mazda MX-5 Cup |
| Mazda MX-5 Cup | Teams: (United States) Hixon Motor Sports | 2022 Mazda MX-5 Cup |
| Michelin Pilot Challenge | Grand Sport: (United States) Trent Hindman; Grand Sport: (United States) Alan Brynjolfsson | 2022 Michelin Pilot Challenge |
| Michelin Pilot Challenge | Grand Sport Teams: (United States) #7 Volt Racing | 2022 Michelin Pilot Challenge |
| Michelin Pilot Challenge | Grand Sport Manufacturers: (Germany) Mercedes-Benz | 2022 Michelin Pilot Challenge |
| Michelin Pilot Challenge | TCR: (United States) Taylor Hagler; TCR: (United States) Michael James Lewis | 2022 Michelin Pilot Challenge |
| Michelin Pilot Challenge | TCR Teams: (United States) #1 Bryan Herta Autosport with Curb-Agajanian | 2022 Michelin Pilot Challenge |
| Michelin Pilot Challenge | TCR Manufacturers: (South Korea) Hyundai | 2022 Michelin Pilot Challenge |
| Praga Cup | (United Kingdom) Jimmy Broadbent (United Kingdom) Gordie Mutch | 2022 Praga Cup |
| Praga Cup | Teams: (United Kingdom) Fanatec Praga Team87 | 2022 Praga Cup |
| Prototype Cup Germany | (Turkey) Berkay Besler (Germany) Marvin Dienst | 2022 Prototype Cup Germany |
| Prototype Cup Germany | Trophy: (Germany) Matthias Lüthen | 2022 Prototype Cup Germany |
| Prototype Cup Germany | Junior: (Germany) Donar Munding | 2022 Prototype Cup Germany |
| Supercar Challenge | GT: (Netherlands) Bart Arendsen | 2022 Supercar Challenge |
| Supercar Challenge | Supersport 1: (Netherlands) Dennis de Borst | 2022 Supercar Challenge |
| Supercar Challenge | Supersport 2: (Netherlands) Laurens de Wit | 2022 Supercar Challenge |
| Supercar Challenge | Sport: (Netherlands) Mark Jobst | 2022 Supercar Challenge |
| Super GT | GT500: (Japan) Kazuki Hiramine; GT500: (Belgium) Bertrand Baguette | 2022 Super GT Series |
| Super GT | GT500 Teams: (Japan) Calsonic Team Impul | 2022 Super GT Series |
| Super GT | GT300: (Japan) Kiyoto Fujinami; GT300: (Brazil) João Paulo de Oliveira | 2022 Super GT Series |
| Super GT | GT300 Teams: (Japan) Kondō Racing | 2022 Super GT Series |
Porsche Supercup, Porsche Carrera Cup, GT3 Cup Challenge and Porsche Sprint Challenge
| Porsche Supercup | (Luxembourg) Dylan Pereira | 2022 Porsche Supercup |
| Porsche Supercup | Teams: (Austria) BWT Lechner Racing | 2022 Porsche Supercup |
| Porsche Supercup | Pro-Am: (Norway) Roar Lindland | 2022 Porsche Supercup |
| Porsche Supercup | Rookies: (Denmark) Bastian Buus | 2022 Porsche Supercup |
| Porsche Carrera Cup Asia | (China) Leo Ye | 2022 Porsche Carrera Cup Asia |
| Porsche Carrera Cup Asia | Teams: (China) JUNJIE Racing | 2022 Porsche Carrera Cup Asia |
| Porsche Carrera Cup Asia | Pro-Am: (China) Wei Lu | 2022 Porsche Carrera Cup Asia |
| Porsche Carrera Cup Asia | Am: (Hong Kong) Henry Kwong | 2022 Porsche Carrera Cup Asia |
| Porsche Carrera Cup Australia | (Australia) Harri Jones | 2022 Porsche Carrera Cup Australia |
| Porsche Carrera Cup Australia | Pro-Am: (Australia) Geoff Emery | 2022 Porsche Carrera Cup Australia |
| Porsche Carrera Cup Australia | Endurance: (Australia) Aaron Love | 2022 Porsche Carrera Cup Australia |
| Porsche Carrera Cup Australia | Endurance Pro-Am: (Australia) Liam Talbot | 2022 Porsche Carrera Cup Australia |
| Porsche Carrera Cup Australia | Junior: (Australia) Harri Jones | 2022 Porsche Carrera Cup Australia |
| Porsche Carrera Cup Deutschland | (Germany) Laurin Heinrich | 2022 Porsche Carrera Cup Germany |
| Porsche Carrera Cup Deutschland | Teams: (Germany) SSR Huber Racing | 2022 Porsche Carrera Cup Germany |
| Porsche Carrera Cup Deutschland | Pro-Am: (Luxembourg) Carlos Rivas | 2022 Porsche Carrera Cup Germany |
| Porsche Carrera Cup Deutschland | Rookie: (United Kingdom) Lorcan Hanafin | 2022 Porsche Carrera Cup Germany |
| Porsche Carrera Cup France | (France) Marvin Klein | 2022 Porsche Carrera Cup France |
| Porsche Carrera Cup France | Teams: (France) Martinet by Alméras | 2022 Porsche Carrera Cup France |
| Porsche Carrera Cup France | Pro-Am: (France) Jérome Boullery | 2022 Porsche Carrera Cup France |
| Porsche Carrera Cup France | Am: (France) Sébastien Dussolliet | 2022 Porsche Carrera Cup France |
| Porsche Carrera Cup Great Britain | (United Kingdom) Kiern Jewiss | 2022 Porsche Carrera Cup Great Britain |
| Porsche Carrera Cup Great Britain | Teams: (United Kingdom) Comline Richardson Racing | 2022 Porsche Carrera Cup Great Britain |
| Porsche Carrera Cup Great Britain | Pro-Am: (United Kingdom) Charles Rainford | 2022 Porsche Carrera Cup Great Britain |
| Porsche Carrera Cup Great Britain | Am: (United Kingdom) Josh Stanton | 2022 Porsche Carrera Cup Great Britain |
| Porsche Carrera Cup Japan | (Japan) Ryo Ogawa | 2022 Porsche Carrera Cup Japan |
| Porsche Carrera Cup Japan | Teams: (Japan) Bigmo Racing | 2022 Porsche Carrera Cup Japan |
| Porsche Carrera Cup Japan | Pro-Am: (Japan) 'Ikari' | 2022 Porsche Carrera Cup Japan |
| Porsche Carrera Cup Japan | Am: (Japan) Motoki Takami | 2022 Porsche Carrera Cup Japan |
| Porsche Carrera Cup North America | (Canada) Parker Thompson | 2022 Porsche Carrera Cup North America |
| Porsche Carrera Cup North America | Teams: (United States) Kelly-Moss Road and Race | 2022 Porsche Carrera Cup North America |
| Porsche Carrera Cup North America | Pro-Am: (United States) Alan Metni | 2022 Porsche Carrera Cup North America |
| Porsche Carrera Cup North America | Am: (United States) Mark Kvamme | 2022 Porsche Carrera Cup North America |
| Porsche Carrera Cup Scandinavia | (Sweden) Lukas Sundahl | 2022 Porsche Carrera Cup Scandinavia |
| Porsche Carrera Cup Scandinavia | Teams: (Sweden) Micke Kågered Racing | 2022 Porsche Carrera Cup Scandinavia |
| Porsche Carrera Cup Scandinavia | Am: (Sweden) Andreas Ahlberg | 2022 Porsche Carrera Cup Scandinavia |

== Touring cars ==
| Series | Champion | refer |
|---|---|---|
| Aussie Racing Cars | (Australia) Joshua Anderson | 2022 Aussie Racing Car Series |
| Aussie Racing Cars | Rookies: (Australia) Lachlan Ward | 2022 Aussie Racing Car Series |
| British Touring Car Championship | (United Kingdom) Tom Ingram | 2022 British Touring Car Championship |
| British Touring Car Championship | Teams: (United Kingdom) NAPA Racing UK | 2022 British Touring Car Championship |
| British Touring Car Championship | Manufacturers: (Germany) BMW | 2022 British Touring Car Championship |
| British Touring Car Championship | Independent: (United Kingdom) Josh Cook | 2022 British Touring Car Championship |
| British Touring Car Championship | Independent Teams: (United Kingdom) BTC Racing | 2022 British Touring Car Championship |
| British Touring Car Championship | Jack Sears Trophy: (United Kingdom) Bobby Thompson | 2022 British Touring Car Championship |
| Russian Circuit Racing Series | TCR: (Russia) Dmitry Bragin | 2022 Russian Circuit Racing Series |
| Russian Circuit Racing Series | TCR Teams: (Russia) STK TAIF Motorsport | 2022 Russian Circuit Racing Series |
| Russian Circuit Racing Series | Super Production: (Russia) Ivan Chubarov | 2022 Russian Circuit Racing Series |
| Russian Circuit Racing Series | Super Production Teams: (Russia) LADA Sport Rosneft | 2022 Russian Circuit Racing Series |
| Russian Circuit Racing Series | Touring Light: (Russia) Nikolay Karamyshev | 2022 Russian Circuit Racing Series |
| Russian Circuit Racing Series | Touring Light Teams: (Russia) Lukoil Racing Rally Academy | 2022 Russian Circuit Racing Series |
| Russian Circuit Racing Series | S1600: (Russia) Rustam Fatkhutdinov | 2022 Russian Circuit Racing Series |
| Russian Circuit Racing Series | S1600 Teams: (Russia) Akhmat Racing Team | 2022 Russian Circuit Racing Series |
| Russian Circuit Racing Series | SMP GT4 Russia: Vadim Mescheryakov | 2022 Russian Circuit Racing Series |
| Russian Circuit Racing Series | SMP GT4 Russia Teams: Motor Sharks Capital Racing Team | 2022 Russian Circuit Racing Series |
| Stock Car Pro Series | (Brazil) Rubens Barrichello | 2022 Stock Car Pro Series |
| Stock Car Pro Series | Teams: (Brazil) AMattheis Vogel | 2022 Stock Car Pro Series |
| Stock Car Pro Series | Manufacturers: (Japan) Toyota | 2022 Stock Car Pro Series |
| Stock Series | (Brazil) Vitor Baptista | 2022 Stock Series |
| Stock Series | Teams: (Brazil) W2 Racing | 2022 Stock Series |
| Supercars Championship | (New Zealand) Shane van Gisbergen | 2022 Supercars Championship |
| Supercars Championship | Teams: (Australia) Triple Eight Race Engineering | 2022 Supercars Championship |
| Supercars Championship | Manufacturers: (Australia) Holden | 2022 Supercars Championship |
| Super2 Series | (Australia) Declan Fraser | 2022 Super2 Series |
| Super2 Series | Super3: (Australia) Brad Vaughan | 2022 Super2 Series |
| Superrace Championship | (South Korea) Kim Jong-kyum | 2022 Superrace Championship |
| Superrace Championship | Teams: (South Korea) Hankook ATLASBX Motorsports | 2022 Superrace Championship |
| Superrace Championship | GT-1: (South Korea) Jung Kyung-hun | 2022 Superrace Championship |
| Superrace Championship | GT-2: (South Korea) Park Jae-hong | 2022 Superrace Championship |
| TC2000 Championship | (Argentina) Leonel Pernía | 2022 TC2000 Championship |
| Touring Car Masters | (Australia) Ryan Hansford | 2022 Touring Car Masters |
| Touring Car Masters | Pro-Am: (Australia) Andrew Fisher | 2022 Touring Car Masters |
| Touring Car Masters | Pro-Sports: (Australia) Warren Trewin | 2022 Touring Car Masters |
TCR Touring Car
| FIA World Touring Car Cup | (Spain) Mikel Azcona | 2022 World Touring Car Cup |
| FIA World Touring Car Cup | Teams: (Italy) BRC Hyundai N Squadra Corse | 2022 World Touring Car Cup |
| FIA World Touring Car Cup | Trophy: (United Kingdom) Robert Huff | 2022 World Touring Car Cup |
| FIA ETCR – eTouring Car World Cup | (France) Adrien Tambay | 2022 FIA ETCR – eTouring Car World Cup |
| FIA ETCR – eTouring Car World Cup | Teams: (Sweden) Cupra Racing EKS | 2022 FIA ETCR – eTouring Car World Cup |
| ADAC TCR Germany Touring Car Championship | (Denmark) Martin Andersen | 2022 ADAC TCR Germany Touring Car Championship |
| ADAC TCR Germany Touring Car Championship | Teams: (Germany) Liqui Moly Team Engstler | 2022 ADAC TCR Germany Touring Car Championship |
| ADAC TCR Germany Touring Car Championship | Junior: (Poland) Szymon Ładniak | 2022 ADAC TCR Germany Touring Car Championship |
| ADAC TCR Germany Touring Car Championship | Trophy: (Germany) Roland Hertner | 2022 ADAC TCR Germany Touring Car Championship |
| TCR Asia Series | (China) David Zhu | 2022 TCR Asia Series |
| TCR Asia Series | Teams: (China) Shell Teamwork Lynk & Co Racing | 2022 TCR Asia Series |
| TCR Asia Series | Am: (China) Yan Chuang | 2022 TCR Asia Series |
| TCR Australia Touring Car Series | (Australia) Tony D'Alberto | 2022 TCR Australia Touring Car Series |
| TCR Denmark Touring Car Series | (Denmark) Kasper H. Jensen | 2022 TCR Denmark Touring Car Series |
| TCR Denmark Touring Car Series | Teams: (Denmark) GMB Motorsport | 2022 TCR Denmark Touring Car Series |
| TCR Denmark Touring Car Series | Trophy: (Denmark) René Povlsen | 2022 TCR Denmark Touring Car Series |
| TCR Eastern Europe Trophy | (Poland) Bartosz Groszek | 2022 TCR Eastern Europe Trophy |
| TCR Eastern Europe Trophy | Teams: (Czech Republic) Janik Motorsport | 2022 TCR Eastern Europe Trophy |
| TCR Eastern Europe Trophy | Trophy: (Poland) Bartosz Groszek | 2022 TCR Eastern Europe Trophy |
| TCR Eastern Europe Trophy | Trophy Teams: (Czech Republic) Janik Motorsport | 2022 TCR Eastern Europe Trophy |
| TCR Eastern Europe Trophy | Junior: (Czech Republic) Petr Semerad | 2022 TCR Eastern Europe Trophy |
| TCR Eastern Europe Trophy | Junior Teams: (Czech Republic) Janik Motorsport | 2022 TCR Eastern Europe Trophy |
| TCR Europe Touring Car Series | (Argentina) Franco Girolami | 2022 TCR Europe Touring Car Series |
| TCR Europe Touring Car Series | Teams: (Belgium) Comtoyou Racing | 2022 TCR Europe Touring Car Series |
| TCR Italy Touring Car Championship | (Netherlands) Niels Langeveld | 2022 TCR Italy Touring Car Championship |
| TCR Italy Touring Car Championship | Teams: (Italy) Target Competition | 2022 TCR Italy Touring Car Championship |
| TCR Italy Touring Car Championship | DSG Challenge: (Italy) Rodolfo Massaro | 2022 TCR Italy Touring Car Championship |
| TCR Italy Touring Car Championship | Rookies: (Italy) Carlo Tamburini | 2022 TCR Italy Touring Car Championship |
| TCR Italy Touring Car Championship | Am: (Italy) Raffaele Guerrieri | 2022 TCR Italy Touring Car Championship |
| TCR Italy Touring Car Championship | Womens: (Italy) Francesca Raffaele | 2022 TCR Italy Touring Car Championship |
| TCR Italy Touring Car Championship | Under-25: (Estonia) Ruben Volt | 2022 TCR Italy Touring Car Championship |
| TCR South America Touring Car Championship | (Argentina) Fabricio Pezzini | 2022 TCR South America Touring Car Championship |
| TCR South America Touring Car Championship | Teams: (Argentina) PMO Motorsport | 2022 TCR South America Touring Car Championship |
| TCR South America Touring Car Championship | Trophy: (Brazil) Fabio Casagrande | 2022 TCR South America Touring Car Championship |
| TCR UK Touring Car Championship | (United Kingdom) Chris Smiley | 2022 TCR UK Touring Car Championship |
| TCR UK Touring Car Championship | Trophy: (United Kingdom) Andy Wilmot | 2022 TCR UK Touring Car Championship |

== Truck racing ==
| Series | Champion | refer |
|---|---|---|
| Copa Truck | (Brazil) Wellington Cirino | 2022 Copa Truck season |
| Copa Truck | Super Truck: (Brazil) Danilo Alamini | 2022 Copa Truck season |
| European Truck Racing Championship | (Hungary) Norbert Kiss | 2022 European Truck Racing Championship |
| European Truck Racing Championship | Grammer Truck Cup: (France) Téo Calvet | 2022 European Truck Racing Championship |
| Fórmula Truck | (Brazil) Márcio Rampon | 2022 Fórmula Truck |
| Fórmula Truck | Teams: (Brazil) Rampon Racing | 2022 Fórmula Truck |
| Stadium Super Trucks | (United States) Gavin Harlien | 2022 Stadium Super Trucks |
| SuperUtes Series | (Australia) Aaron Borg | 2022 SuperUtes Series |
