= 2019 Australian Formula 4 Championship =

Motor racing competition

The 2019 CAMS Australian Formula 4 Championship (initially known for sponsorship purposes as the CAMS Jayco Australian Formula 4 Championship and later as the CAMS Payce Australian Formula 4 Championship) was the fifth season of the Australian Formula 4 Championship, a motor racing competition for open-wheel racing cars complying with Formula 4 regulations, which were created by the Fédération Internationale de l'Automobile (FIA) for entry-level open-wheel championships. Teams and drivers competed in eighteen races at four venues, starting on 14 March and ending on 14 July.

== Teams and drivers ==
Team	No.	Drivers	Rounds
(Australia) AGI Sport	1	(Australia) Jayden Ojeda	1
(Australia) AGI Sport	7	(Australia) Christian Mansell	3–4
(Australia) AGI Sport	12	(Australia) Josh Smith	1
(Australia) AGI Sport	23	(Australia) Luis Leeds	All
(Australia) AGI Sport	39	(Australia) Antonio Astuti	All
(Australia) AGI Sport	57	(Australia) Jackson Burton	1
(Australia) Team BRM	5	(Australia) Ryan Suhle	All
(Australia) Team BRM	15	(Australia) Lochie Hughes	All
(Australia) Team BRM	16	(Australia) Tommy Smith	1–2, 5–6
(Australia) Team BRM	26	(Australia) Harry Hayek	3–4
(Australia) Team BRM	69	(Australia) Brenton Griguol	1
(Australia) Team BRM	76	(Australia) Emerson Harvey	All
(New Zealand) MTEC Motorsport	9	(New Zealand) Taylor Cockerton	1
(New Zealand) MTEC Motorsport	99	(New Zealand) Ryan Yardley	1
(Australia) Patrizicorse	11	(Australia) Jackson Walls	All
(Australia) Patrizicorse	29	(Australia) Aaron Zerefos	1
(Australia) Junior Racing Development	14	(Australia) Matt Holmes	1
(Australia) Junior Racing Development	31	(Australia) Heath Collinson	1
(United Kingdom) Rossoverde Racing	21	(United Kingdom) Christian Lester	1
(Australia) Tank Motorsport	68	(Australia) Dylan Thomas	1

== Calendar ==
All rounds were held in Australia. For the first time the series supported the Formula 1 Australian Grand Prix. The remaining events supported the Shannons Nationals.

Round		Circuit	Date	Pole position	Fastest lap	Winning driver	Winning team
1	R1	Melbourne Grand Prix Circuit (Melbourne, Victoria)	15 March	(Australia) Luis Leeds	(Australia) Jayden Ojeda	(Australia) Luis Leeds	(Australia) AGI Sport
1	R2	Melbourne Grand Prix Circuit (Melbourne, Victoria)	16 March		(Australia) Antonio Astuti	(Australia) Antonio Astuti	(Australia) AGI Sport
1	R3	Melbourne Grand Prix Circuit (Melbourne, Victoria)	17 March	(Australia) Jayden Ojeda	(Australia) Jayden Ojeda	(Australia) Jayden Ojeda	(Australia) AGI Sport
2	R4	Sydney Motorsport Park (Eastern Creek, New South Wales)	18 May	(Australia) Luis Leeds	(Australia) Luis Leeds	(Australia) Luis Leeds	(Australia) AGI Sport
2	R5	Sydney Motorsport Park (Eastern Creek, New South Wales)	19 May		(Australia) Luis Leeds	(Australia) Ryan Suhle	(Australia) Team BRM
2	R6	Sydney Motorsport Park (Eastern Creek, New South Wales)	19 May	(Australia) Luis Leeds	(Australia) Ryan Suhle	(Australia) Luis Leeds	(Australia) AGI Sport
3	R7	Phillip Island Grand Prix Circuit (Phillip Island, Victoria)	7 June	(Australia) Luis Leeds	(Australia) Luis Leeds	(Australia) Luis Leeds	(Australia) AGI Sport
3	R8	Phillip Island Grand Prix Circuit (Phillip Island, Victoria)	8 June		(Australia) Luis Leeds	(Australia) Lochie Hughes	(Australia) Team BRM
3	R9	Phillip Island Grand Prix Circuit (Phillip Island, Victoria)	8 June	(Australia) Luis Leeds	(Australia) Antonio Astuti	(Australia) Ryan Suhle	(Australia) Team BRM
4	R10	Phillip Island Grand Prix Circuit (Phillip Island, Victoria)	8 June	(Australia) Luis Leeds	(Australia) Luis Leeds	(Australia) Luis Leeds	(Australia) AGI Sport
4	R11	Phillip Island Grand Prix Circuit (Phillip Island, Victoria)	8 June		(Australia) Luis Leeds	(Australia) Ryan Suhle	(Australia) Team BRM
4	R12	Phillip Island Grand Prix Circuit (Phillip Island, Victoria)	9 June	(Australia) Luis Leeds	(Australia) Luis Leeds	(Australia) Luis Leeds	(Australia) AGI Sport
5	R13	The Bend Motorsport Park (Tailem Bend, South Australia)	12 July	(Australia) Lochie Hughes	(Australia) Ryan Suhle	(Australia) Luis Leeds	(Australia) AGI Sport
5	R14	The Bend Motorsport Park (Tailem Bend, South Australia)	13 July		(Australia) Ryan Suhle	(Australia) Lochie Hughes	(Australia) Team BRM
5	R15	The Bend Motorsport Park (Tailem Bend, South Australia)	13 July	(Australia) Lochie Hughes	(Australia) Jackson Walls	(Australia) Jackson Walls	(Australia) Patrizicorse
6	R16	The Bend Motorsport Park (Tailem Bend, South Australia)	14 July	(Australia) Ryan Suhle	(Australia) Lochie Hughes	(Australia) Lochie Hughes	(Australia) Team BRM
6	R17	The Bend Motorsport Park (Tailem Bend, South Australia)	14 July		(Australia) Antonio Astuti	(Australia) Luis Leeds	(Australia) AGI Sport
6	R18	The Bend Motorsport Park (Tailem Bend, South Australia)	14 July	(Australia) Luis Leeds	(Australia) Luis Leeds	(Australia) Luis Leeds	(Australia) AGI Sport

== Points system ==
Championship points were awarded in each race as follows:

Position	1st	2nd	3rd	4th	5th	6th	7th	8th	9th	10th
Points	25	18	15	12	10	8	6	4	2	1

== Championship standings ==
Pos	Driver	MEL			SYD			PHI1			PHI2			BEN1			BEN2			Points
1	(Australia) Luis Leeds	**1**	9	2	**1**	2	**1**	**1**	2	**2**	**1**	2	**1**	1	3	3	2	1	**1**	365
2	(Australia) Lochie Hughes	3	5	4	2	Ret	2	4	1	DNS	2	6	3	**4**	1	**2**	1	3	2	266
3	(Australia) Ryan Suhle	2	8	3	DNS	1	3	2	Ret	1	4	1	6	2	2	6	**3**	2	6	250
4	(Australia) Antonio Astuti	6	1	15	3	5	4	DSQ	5	3	3	3	2	3	4	5	Ret	4	3	207
5	(Australia) Jackson Walls	Ret	6	10	5	3	5	6	Ret	5	6	5	5	7	5	1	Ret	DNS	Ret	125
6	(Australia) Emerson Harvey	13	14	14	6	4	6	Ret	4	4	7	7	8	5	7	7	Ret	6	5	112
7	(Australia) Tommy Smith	9	4	8	4	6	7							6	6	4	4	5	4	106
8	(Australia) Harry Hayek							3	3	7	5	8	4							66
9	(Australia) Jayden Ojeda	5	Ret	**1**																35
10	(New Zealand) Taylor Cockerton	7	3	5																31
11	(New Zealand) Ryan Yardley	10	2	6																27
12	(Australia) Jackson Burton	4	10	7																19
13	(Australia) Dylan Thomas	12	7	11																6
14	(Australia) Josh Smith	8	Ret	9																6
15	(Australia) Matt Holmes	11	Ret	12																0
16	(Australia) Brenton Griguol	14	11	17																0
17	(Australia) Heath Collinson	Ret	12	13																0
18	(United Kingdom) Christian Lester	Ret	13	16																0
19	(Australia) Aaron Zerefos	15	15	18																0
Drivers ineligible for championship points
–	(Australia) Christian Mansell							5	6	6	Ret	4	7							–
Pos	Driver	MEL			SYD			PHI1			PHI2			BEN1			BEN2			Points

Colour	Result
Gold	Winner
Silver	Second place
Bronze	Third place
Green	Points classification
Blue	Non-points classification
Blue	Non-classified finish (NC)
Purple	Retired, not classified (Ret)
Red	Did not qualify (DNQ)
Red	Did not pre-qualify (DNPQ)
Black	Disqualified (DSQ)
White	Did not start (DNS)
White	Withdrew (WD)
White	Race cancelled (C)
Blank	Did not practice (DNP)
Blank	Did not arrive (DNA)
Blank	Excluded (EX)

Bold – Pole
Italics – Fastest lap
† — Did not finish, but classified
