= 2022 Formula 4 United States Championship =

Motor racing competition

The 2022 Formula 4 United States Championship season was the seventh season of the Formula 4 United States Championship, a motor racing series regulated according to FIA Formula 4 regulations and sanctioned by SCCA Pro Racing, the professional racing division of the Sports Car Club of America.

== Teams and drivers ==
Team	No.	Driver	Rounds
(United States) Jensen Global Advisors	1	(United States) Maximillian Parker	1
(United States) Jensen Global Advisors	2	(Sweden) Oliver Westling	1–4
(United States) Jay Howard Driver Development	3	(United States) Michael Boyiadzis	3–6
(United States) Jay Howard Driver Development	4	(United States) Seth Brown	All
(United States) Jay Howard Driver Development	5	(Canada) Jack Zheng	1
(United States) Jay Howard Driver Development	5	(United States) Earl Tucker	4, 6
(United States) Jay Howard Driver Development	6	(Australia) Lochie Hughes	All
(United States) Jay Howard Driver Development	7	(United States) Joe Ostholthoff	1–2
(United States) Jay Howard Driver Development	7	(United States) Albert Morey IV	3–6
(United States) Jay Howard Driver Development	98	(Canada) Louka St-Jean	1–2, 4–5
(United States) Future Star Racing	8	(United States) David Burketh	1–2
(United States) Future Star Racing	8	(United States) Andre Castro	3, 5–6
(United States) Future Star Racing	88	(Uruguay) Maite Cáceres	6
(United States) Gonella Racing	9	(Thailand) Carl Bennett	All
(United States) Gonella Racing	17	(United States) Tyke Durst	All
(United States) Gonella Racing	22	(Mexico) Arturo Flores	1–4, 6
(Brazil) Cará Origin Motosports	10	(Brazil) Daniel Cará	5–6
(United States) Crosslink/Kiwi Motorsport	11	(United States) Cole Kleck	6
(United States) Crosslink/Kiwi Motorsport	30	(Australia) Lewis Hodgson	1
(United States) Crosslink/Kiwi Motorsport	31	(United States) Titus Sherlock	6
(United States) Crosslink/Kiwi Motorsport	39	(United States) Bryson Morris	All
(United States) Crosslink/Kiwi Motorsport	55	(Brazil) Lucas Fecury	All
(United States) Crosslink/Kiwi Motorsport	66	(United States) Ryan Shehan	All
(United States) Crosslink/Kiwi Motorsport	76	(Brazil) Gabriel Fonseca	All
(United States) Crosslink/Kiwi Motorsport	09	(United States) Madison Aust	All
(United States) Velocity Racing Development	12	(United States) Ethan Barker	6
(United States) Velocity Racing Development	24	(United States) Nicholas Rivers	1–2
(United States) Velocity Racing Development	24	(United States) Jacob Loomis	6
(United States) Velocity Racing Development	45	(United States) Matthew Christensen	1–5
(United States) Velocity Racing Development	65	(United States) Noah Ping	All
(United States) Barker Racing	12	(United States) Ethan Barker	2–3, 5
(United States) DEForce Racing	16	(United States) Brady Golan	6
(United States) DEForce Racing	18	(United States) Maxwell Jamieson	6
(United States) DEForce Racing	19	(United States) Kory Enders	6
(United States) Doran-Kroll Competition	19	(Canada) Jack Zheng	4
(United States) Doran-Kroll Competition	08	(Canada) Alexander Berg	All
(United States) International Motorsport	21	(Uruguay) Maite Cáceres	1–3
(United States) International Motorsport	32	(Argentina) Giorgio Carrara	3
(United States) International Motorsport	53	(France) Alan Isambard	1–3
(United States) IGY6 Motorsports	25	(United States) Jacob Bolen	3, 5–6

== Race calendar ==
The 2022 calendar was announced on 23 September 2021. The series planned to hold a pre-season test at Road Atlanta in March but it was moved to NOLA Motorsports Park. Each round featured three races.

Round		Circuit	Date	Pole position	Fastest lap	Winning driver	Winning team	Supporting
1	R1	NOLA Motorsports Park, Avondale	9 April	(United States) Matthew Christensen	(United States) Noah Ping	(Australia) Lochie Hughes	(United States) Jay Howard Driver Development	Formula Regional Americas Championship; SVRA
1	R2	NOLA Motorsports Park, Avondale	10 April		(United States) Bryson Morris	(United States) Bryson Morris	(United States) Crosslink/Kiwi Motorsport	Formula Regional Americas Championship; SVRA
1	R3	NOLA Motorsports Park, Avondale	10 April		(United States) Nicholas Rivers	(United States) Nicholas Rivers	(United States) Velocity Racing Development	Formula Regional Americas Championship; SVRA
2	R1	Road America, Elkhart Lake	21 May	(Australia) Lochie Hughes	(United States) Matthew Christensen	(United States) Matthew Christensen	(United States) Velocity Racing Development	Formula Regional Americas Championship; SVRA
2	R2	Road America, Elkhart Lake	22 May		(United States) Noah Ping	(United States) Matthew Christensen	(United States) Velocity Racing Development	Formula Regional Americas Championship; SVRA
2	R3	Road America, Elkhart Lake	22 May		(United States) Matthew Christensen	(United States) Noah Ping	(United States) Velocity Racing Development	Formula Regional Americas Championship; SVRA
3	R1	Mid-Ohio Sports Car Course, Lexington	25 June	(United States) Andre Castro	(Canada) Alexander Berg	(United States) Bryson Morris	(United States) Crosslink/Kiwi Motorsport	Formula Regional Americas Championship; SVRA; Trans-Am Series
3	R2	Mid-Ohio Sports Car Course, Lexington	26 June		(Australia) Lochie Hughes	(Australia) Lochie Hughes	(United States) Jay Howard Driver Development	Formula Regional Americas Championship; SVRA; Trans-Am Series
3	R3	Mid-Ohio Sports Car Course, Lexington	26 June		(Australia) Lochie Hughes	(United States) Noah Ping	(United States) Velocity Racing Development	Formula Regional Americas Championship; SVRA; Trans-Am Series
4	R1	New Jersey Motorsports Park, Millville	30 July	(Australia) Lochie Hughes	(Australia) Lochie Hughes	(United States) Ryan Shehan (Note: Lochie Hughes finished the race first but was given a 5 seconds penalty. Shehan inherited the win.)	(United States) Crosslink/Kiwi Motorsport	Formula Regional Americas Championship; SVRA
4	R2	New Jersey Motorsports Park, Millville	31 July		(Australia) Lochie Hughes	(Australia) Lochie Hughes	(United States) Jay Howard Driver Development	Formula Regional Americas Championship; SVRA
4	R3	New Jersey Motorsports Park, Millville	31 July		(United States) Seth Brown	(Australia) Lochie Hughes	(United States) Jay Howard Driver Development	Formula Regional Americas Championship; SVRA
5	R1	Virginia International Raceway, Alton	8 October	(United States) Bryson Morris	(United States) Ryan Shehan	(United States) Ryan Shehan	(United States) Crosslink/Kiwi Motorsport	Formula Regional Americas Championship; SVRA; Trans-Am Series
5	R2	Virginia International Raceway, Alton	8 October		(Brazil) Gabriel Fonseca	(United States) Bryson Morris	(United States) Crosslink/Kiwi Motorsport	Formula Regional Americas Championship; SVRA; Trans-Am Series
5	R3	Virginia International Raceway, Alton	9 October		(United States) Noah Ping	(United States) Noah Ping	(United States) Velocity Racing Development	Formula Regional Americas Championship; SVRA; Trans-Am Series
6	R1	Circuit of the Americas, Austin	3 November	(United States) Jacob Loomis	(United States) Noah Ping	(United States) Noah Ping	(United States) Velocity Racing Development	Formula Regional Americas Championship; SVRA; Trans-Am Series
6	R2	Circuit of the Americas, Austin	3 November		(Australia) Lochie Hughes	(Australia) Lochie Hughes	(United States) Jay Howard Driver Development	Formula Regional Americas Championship; SVRA; Trans-Am Series
6	R3	Circuit of the Americas, Austin	4 November		(United States) Jacob Loomis	(Australia) Lochie Hughes	(United States) Jay Howard Driver Development	Formula Regional Americas Championship; SVRA; Trans-Am Series

== Championship standings ==
Points were awarded as follows:

Position	**1st**	**2nd**	**3rd**	**4th**	**5th**	**6th**	**7th**	**8th**	**9th**	**10th**
Points	25	18	15	12	10	8	6	4	2	1

=== Drivers' standings ===
Pos	Driver	NOL			ROA			MOH			NJM			VIR			COA			Pts
Pos	Driver	R1	R2	R3	R1	R2	R3	R1	R2	R3	R1	R2	R3	R1 (Note: Half points were awarded as the leader completed insufficient number of laps under green flag conditions.)	R2	R3	R1	R2	R3	Pts
1	(Australia) Lochie Hughes	1	5	2	**2**	4	4	19	1	5	**6**	1	1	Ret	2	2	4	1	1	277
2	(United States) Bryson Morris	2	1	17	9	5	5	1	3	2	2	2	3	**2**	1	14	6	7	Ret	222
3	(United States) Noah Ping	20	3	13	6	2	1	6	2	1	Ret	5	4	3	4	1	1	Ret	15	196
4	(United States) Ryan Shehan	3	4	8	8	8	11	2	19	3	1	3	2	1	3	Ret	9	11	5	169.5
5	(Canada) Alexander Berg	4	Ret	3	3	3	6	5	Ret	Ret	4	4	5	Ret	Ret	4	8	3	12	134
6	(United States) Matthew Christensen	**21**	2	10	1	1	2	Ret	4	7	8	9	6	8	6	Ret				129
7	(Brazil) Gabriel Fonseca	5	7	Ret	18	9	7	4	7	11	Ret	6	15	4	12	Ret	7	4	4	86
8	(United States) Andre Castro							**3**	5	6				5	14	3	11	2	3	78.5
9	(United States) Nicholas Rivers	6	18	1	4	6	3													68
10	(Mexico) Arturo Flores	7	8	4	10	Ret	8	7	6	18	7	8	13				12	8	7	61
11	(Canada) Louka St-Jean	9	6	15	5	Ret	16				3	7	Ret	7	10	13				45
12	(United States) Jacob Loomis																**2**	9	2	38
13	(United States) Seth Brown	14	12	6	13	13	19	9	10	21	10	13	7	Ret	5	12	DNS	DNS	11	28
14	(Thailand) Carl Bennett	11	10	9	11	10	12	8	8	20	11	10	8	6	Ret	7	17	22	20	24
15	(France) Alan Isambard	10	9	5	17	11	13	10	9	8										20
16	(United States) Ethan Barker				Ret	14	14	Ret	15	12				9	13	Ret	3	19	9	18
17	(United States) Cole Kleck																5	12	6	18
18	(Brazil) Lucas Fecury	13	11	19	12	15	18	11	21	9	9	17	11	Ret	8	5	13	17	10	14
19	(Sweden) Oliver Westling	12	14	7	7	Ret	9	Ret	16	16	13	14	12							14
20	(Argentina) Giorgio Carrara							12	12	4										12
21	(United States) Tyke Durst	18	13	12	Ret	16	15	14	13	10	Ret	15	10	11	7	6	14	13	17	12
22	(United States) Titus Sherlock																Ret	6	8	12
23	(United States) Maxwell Jamieson																10	5	Ret	11
24	(United States) David Burketh	8	Ret	DNS	16	7	10													11
25	(United States) Earl Tucker										5	Ret	Ret				21	14	14	10
26	(Brazil) Daniel Cará													13	Ret	8	16	10	13	3
27	(United States) Michael Boyiadzis							18	20	19	16	16	Ret	10	9	10	22	21	19	3
28	(United States) Madison Aust	16	Ret	14	15	18	20	13	17	15	15	12	9	DNS	11	Ret	23	20	22	2
29	(United States) Albert Morey IV							16	14	13	12	Ret	Ret	14	15	9	20	16	18	1
30	(United States) Jacob Bolen							15	11	14				12	Ret	11	18	18	23	0
31	(Canada) Jack Zheng	22	19	Ret							14	11	14							0
32	(United States) Joe Ostholthoff	15	15	11	14	17	17													0
33	(Uruguay) Maite Cáceres	17	16	Ret	Ret	12	Ret	17	18	17							15	15	21	0
34	(United States) Maximillian Parker	Ret	17	16																0
35	(United States) Brady Golan																19	23	16	0
36	(Australia) Lewis Hodgson	19	Ret	18																0
–	(United States) Kory Enders																DNS	DNS	DNS	–
Pos	Driver	R1	R2	R3	R1	R2	R3	R1	R2	R3	R1	R2	R3	R1	R2	R3	R1	R2	R3	Pts
Pos	Driver	NOL			ROA			MOH			NJM			VIR			COA			Pts

Colour	Result
Gold	Winner
Silver	Second place
Bronze	Third place
Green	Points classification
Blue	Non-points classification
Blue	Non-classified finish (NC)
Purple	Retired, not classified (Ret)
Red	Did not qualify (DNQ)
Red	Did not pre-qualify (DNPQ)
Black	Disqualified (DSQ)
White	Did not start (DNS)
White	Withdrew (WD)
White	Race cancelled (C)
Blank	Did not practice (DNP)
Blank	Did not arrive (DNA)
Blank	Excluded (EX)

**Bold** – Pole
Italics – Fastest Lap

=== Teams' standings ===
Each team acquired the points earned by their two best drivers in each race.

Pos	Team	Pts
1	(United States) Crosslink/Kiwi Motorsport	447.5
2	(United States) Velocity Racing Development	406
3	(United States) Jay Howard Driver Development	356.5
4	(United States) Doran-Kroll Competition	138
5	(United States) Gonella Racing	98
6	(United States) Future Star Racing	89.5
7	(United States) International Motorsport	33
8	(United States) Jensen Global Advisors	14
9	(United States) DEForce Racing	11
10	(Brazil) Cará Origin Motosports	3
11	(United States) Barker Racing	1
12	(United States) IGY6 Motorsports	0
