= Lochie Hughes =

Australian racing driver

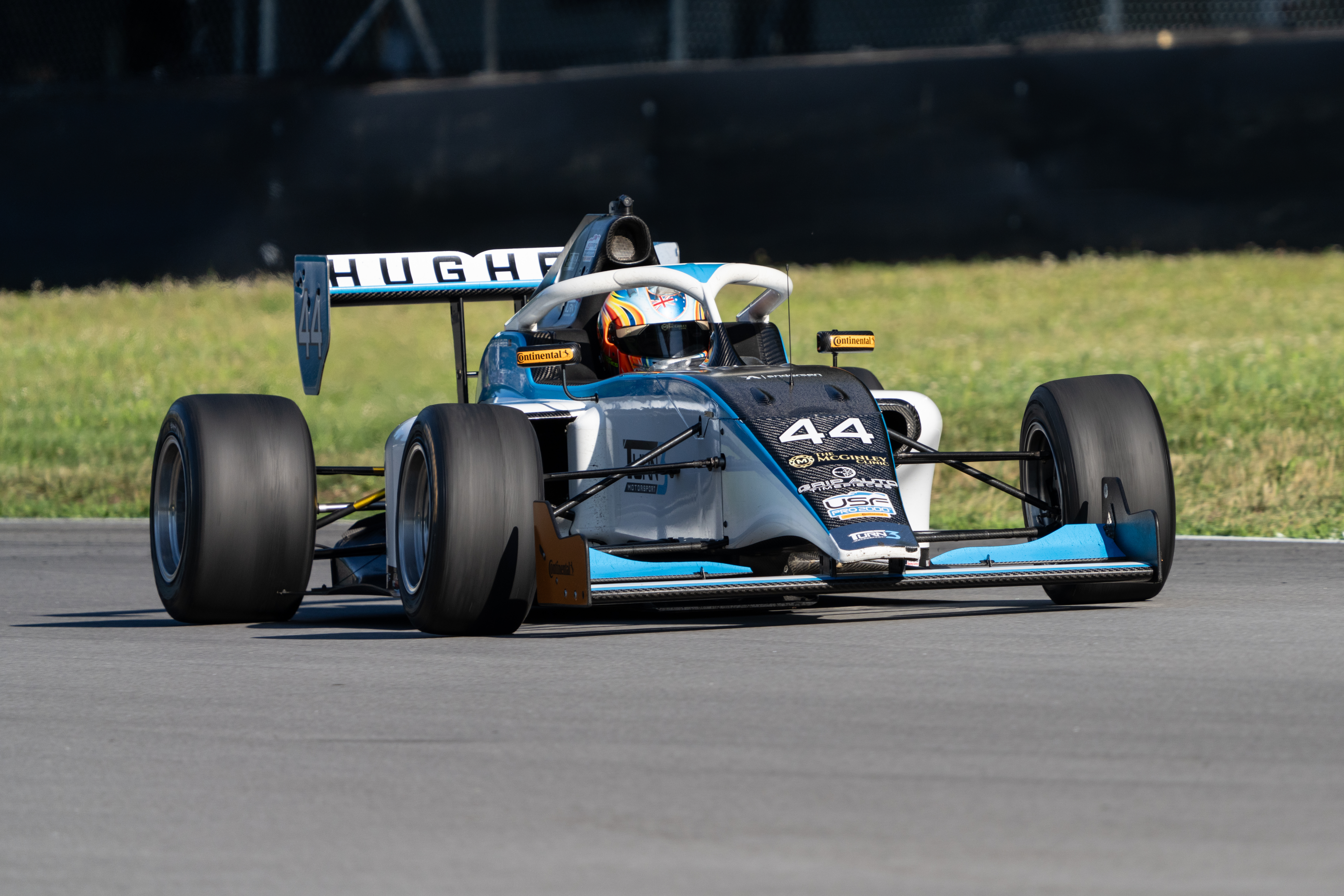
- Hughes at the Mid-Ohio Sports Car Course in 2024
- Nationality: (Australia) Australian
- Born: Lachlan Hughes; 15 March 2002 (age 24) Gold Coast, Queensland, Australia

Indy NXT career
- Debut season: 2025
- Current team: Andretti Global
- Categorisation: FIA Silver
- Car number: 26
- Starts: 14
- Wins: 2
- Podiums: 8
- Poles: 2
- Fastest laps: 2
- Best finish: 3rd in 2025

Previous series
- 2024 2022–23 2022 2018–19: USF Pro 2000 Championship; USF2000 Championship; Formula 4 United States Championship; Australian Formula 4 Championship

Championship titles
- 2024 2022: USF Pro 2000 Championship; Formula 4 United States Championship

Awards
- 2018 Motorsport Australia Young Driver of the Year

Lachlan "Lochie" Hughes (born 15 March 2002) is an Australian racing driver who currently competes in Indy NXT for Andretti Global and serves as a reserve driver for the team in the IndyCar Series.

Hughes made his American open-wheel debut in 2022, winning the 2022 Formula 4 United States Championship for Jay Howard Driver Development. He then finished third in the 2023 USF2000 Championship and won the 2024 USF Pro 2000 Championship. In his debut Indy NXT season in 2025, he finished third.

== Career ==
=== Karting ===
Hughes would have success in karting, finishing second in both the Florida Winter Tour, the WSK Gold cup and the Australian Kart Championship in 2014, 2015 and 2017 respectively.

=== Australian Formula 4 Championship ===
==== 2018 ====
In 2018, Hughes would make his car racing debut in the Australian Formula 4 Championship driving for Team BRM. He would get his maiden win in the series at Winton Motor Raceway. Hughes would finish the season fifth in the standings and rookie champion.

==== 2019 ====
Hughes would return to the series in 2019 once again driving for Team BRM. He would get three wins, two poles, and eleven podiums during the season to finish second behind champion Luis Leeds.

=== Formula 4 United States Championship ===
After not racing in 2020 and 2021 due to the COVID-19 pandemic, Hughes would move to the United States to compete in the 2022 Formula 4 United States Championship driving for Jay Howard Driver Development. He would start off the season with a win in the first race at NOLA Motorsports Park. At the New Jersey Motorsports Park round, Hughes would take pole position, and won all three races on-track, however, a penalty in race one for jumping the start meant that his win would be taken away. Hughes would clinch the championship at the final round at Circuit of the Americas taking two wins to cap off the season. He would finish the season with six wins, two poles, and ten podiums.

=== USF2000 Championship ===
==== 2022 ====
Hughes would make his debut in the USF2000 Championship in 2022 with Jay Howard Driver Development at the Mid-Ohio round. Finishing second in his first ever race later to be disqualified for a technical infringement.

==== 2023 ====
On 6 October 2022, it was announced that Hughes would stay with Jay Howard Driver Development and make the jump up to the USF2000 Championship full-time in 2023. At the opening round at St. Petersburg, Hughes would beat competitor Nikita Johnson to pole position by just eight hundredths of a second. He would manage to convert pole to victory, getting his maiden win of the season.

=== USF Pro 2000 Championship ===
==== 2024 ====
Hughes made his debut in the 2024 season racing with Turn 3 Motorsport. Claiming five wins, four pole positions and eleven podiums, Hughes won the title at the season finale at Portland ahead of Nikita Johnson.

=== Indy NXT ===
==== 2025 ====
In October 2024, Hughes graduated to the championship for the 2025 season with Andretti Global. In the opening race of the season at St. Petersburg, he would qualify second behind his teammate Dennis Hauger. Hughes would convert his qualifying result in the race, finishing on the podium in second. He would score another podium in the second round at Barber, finishing third behind debutant Evagoras Papasavvas and Hauger. For the third round of the season at Indianapolis, Hughes qualified on pole for both Indy GP races, ahead of teammate and championship leader Hauger. He would have a dominant performance in race one, leading from the start, and going on to score his maiden win in the series. Hughes would close down the gap to Hauger by thirty points to just three points following Hauger's finish of eighth.

==== 2026 ====
Hughes returned with Andretti for the 2026 season.

=== IndyCar ===
Alongside his Indy NXT campaign, Hughes will also serve as the reserve driver for Andretti in IndyCar for 2026.

== Karting record ==
=== Karting career summary ===
Season	Series	Team	Position
2014	Florida Winter Tour – Rotax Mini Max	Praga North America	11th
2014	Florida Winter Tour – Kart Formula TaG Cadet	IPKarting Australia	2nd
2014	ROK Cup International Final – Mini ROK	Praga Kart Racing	14th
2014	WSK Final Cup — 60 Mini		16th
2015	WSK Night Edition — 60 Mini	Birel ART	7th
2015	WSK Gold Cup — 60 Mini	Birel ART	2nd
2015	South Garda Winter Cup – Mini ROK	Birel ART	6th
2016	CIK-FIA European Championship — OK Junior		52nd
2016	WSK Night Edition — OKJ	Novalux Srl	12th
2016	Australian Kart Championship – KA2		4th
2016	Italian Championship — OKJ		13th
2017	Australian Kart Championship – KA2		2nd
2017	Race Of Stars	Birel ART	1st

== Racing record ==
=== Racing career summary ===
Season	Series	Team	Races	Wins	Poles	F/Laps	Podiums	Points	Position
2018	Australian Formula 4 Championship	Team BRM	21	1	0	1	2	224	5th
2019	Australian Formula 4 Championship	Team BRM	18	3	2	0	11	266	**2nd**
2022	YACademy Winter Series	Jay Howard Driver Development	3	0	0	0	0	0	NC†
2022	Formula 4 United States Championship	Jay Howard Driver Development	18	6	2	5	10	277	**1st**
2022	USF2000 Championship	Jay Howard Driver Development	3	0	0	0	0	22	28th
2023	USF2000 Championship	Jay Howard Driver Development	18	4	2	0	8	335	**3rd**
2024	USF Pro 2000 Championship	Turn 3 Motorsport	18	5	4	3	11	395	**1st**
2025	Indy NXT	Andretti Global	14	2	2	2	8	466	**3rd**
2026	Indy NXT	Andretti Global	17	1	1	1	4	453	5th
2026	IndyCar Series	Andretti Global	Reserve driver						

* Season still in progress. ^{†} As Hughes was a guest driver, he was ineligible to score points.

=== Complete Australian Formula 4 Championship results ===
(key) (Races in bold indicate pole position) (Races in italics indicate fastest lap)

Year	Team	1	2	3	4	5	6	7	8	9	10	11	12	13	14	15	16	17	18	19	20	21	DC	Points
2018	Team BRM	SYM; 1; 5	SYM; 2; 4	SYM; 3; 7	PHI; 1; 5	PHI; 2; 5	PHI; 3; 5	QLD; 1; 5	QLD; 2; 5	QLD; 3; 6	WIN1; 1; 4	WIN1; 2; 1	WIN1; 3; 5	WIN2; 1; 4	WIN2; 2 Ret	WIN2; 3; 5	SYD; 1; 4	SYD; 2; 5	SYD; 3; 4	PUK; 1; 5	PUK; 2; 3	PUK; 3; 5	5th	224
2019	Team BRM	MEL; 1; 3	MEL; 2; 5	MEL; 3; 4	SYD; 1; 2	SYD; 2 Ret	SYD; 3; 2	PHI1; 1; 4	PHI1; 2; 1	PHI1; 3 DNS	PHI2; 1; 2	PHI2; 2; 6	PHI2; 3; 3	**BEN1**; **1**; 4	BEN1; 2; 1	**BEN1**; **3**; 2	BEN2; 1; 1	BEN2; 2; 3	BEN2; 3; 2				2nd	266

=== Complete Formula 4 United States Championship results ===
(key) (Races in bold indicate pole position) (Races in italics indicate fastest lap)

Year	Team	1	2	3	4	5	6	7	8	9	10	11	12	13	14	15	16	17	18	Pos	Points
2022	Jay Howard Driver Development	NOL; 1; 1	NOL; 2; 5	NOL; 3; 2	**ROA**; **1**; 2	ROA; 2; 4	ROA; 3; 4	MOH; 1; 19	MOH; 2; 1	MOH; 3; 5	**NJM**; **1**; 6	NJM; 2; 1	NJM; 3; 1	VIR; 1 Ret	VIR; 2; 2	VIR; 3; 2	COA; 1; 4	COA; 2; 1	COA; 3; 1	1st	277

=== American open-wheel racing results ===
==== USF2000 Championship ====
(key) (Races in bold indicate pole position) (Races in italics indicate fastest lap) (Races with * indicate most race laps led)

Year	Team	1	2	3	4	5	6	7	8	9	10	11	12	13	14	15	16	17	18	Rank	Points
2022	Jay Howard Driver Development	STP; 1	STP; 2	ALA; 1	ALA; 2	IMS; 1	IMS; 2	IMS; 3	IRP	ROA; 1	ROA; 2	MOH; 1 DSQ	MOH; 2; 18	MOH; 3; 4	TOR; 1	TOR; 2	POR; 1	POR; 2	POR; 3	28th	22
2023	Jay Howard Driver Development	**STP**; **1**; 1*	STP; 2; 3	SEB; 1; 1*	SEB; 1; 4	IMS; 1; 2	IMS; 2; 2	IMS; 3; 1*	**IRP**; 6	**ROA**; **1**; 12	ROA; 2; 1*	MOH; 1; 4	MOH; 2; 19	MOH; 3; 22	TOR; 1; 15	TOR; 2; 3	POR; 1; 5	POR; 2; 13	POR; 3; 10	3rd	335

==== USF Pro 2000 Championship ====
(key) (Races in bold indicate pole position) (Races in italics indicate fastest lap) (Races with * indicate most race laps led)

Year	Team	1	2	3	4	5	6	7	8	9	10	11	12	13	14	15	16	17	18	Rank	Points
2024	Turn 3 Motorsport	**STP**; **1**; 1*	**STP**; **2**; 2*	LOU; 1; 19	LOU; 2; 18	LOU; 3; 10	IMS; 1; 3	IMS; 2; 2	IMS; 3; 3	IRP; 3	**ROA**; **1**; 1*	ROA; 2; 1	ROA; 3; 1*	MOH; 1; 4	MOH; 2; 7	TOR; 1; 6	**TOR**; **2**; 1*	POR; 1; 6	POR; 2; 2	1st	395

==== Indy NXT ====
(key) (Races in bold indicate pole position) (Races in italics indicate fastest lap) (Races with ^{L} indicate a race lap led) (Races with * indicate most race laps led)

Year	Team	1	2	3	4	5	6	7	8	9	10	11	12	13	14	15	16	17	Rank	Points
2025	Andretti Global	STP; 2	BAR; 3	**IMS**; 1^{L}*	**IMS**; 2^{L}	DET; 5	GMP; 1^{L}	RDA; 3	MOH; 3	IOW; 16	LAG; 6	LAG; 15	POR; 10	MIL; 3	NSH; 5				3rd	466
2026	Andretti Global	STP; 5	ARL; 5	BAR; 12	BAR; 16	IMS; 2^{L}*	IMS; 4	DET; 21	**GAT**; 6	ROA; 1^{L}*	ROA; 20	MOH; 5	MOH; 10	NSS; 7	POR; 2	MIL; 14	LAG; 14	LAG; 3	5th	453
