= 2022 Sidecar Motocross World Championship =

Motocross World Championship

2022 Sidecarcross World Championship
Season
- Grands Prix: 6
- Duration: 24 April 2022–18 September 2022

Drivers
- Champions: (Netherlands) Etienne Bax (Czech Republic) Ondřej Čermák

The 2022 FIM Sidecarcross World Championship was the 42nd edition of the competition.

== Calendar ==
The Grand Prix calendar for the 2022 season:

GP	Date	Location	Race Winners	Grand Prix Winner	Source
1	24 April	(Netherlands) Markelo	(Netherlands) Etienne Bax / (Czech Republic) Ondřej Čermák	(Netherlands) Etienne Bax / (Czech Republic) Ondřej Čermák	Result
1	24 April	(Netherlands) Markelo	(Netherlands) Etienne Bax / (Czech Republic) Ondřej Čermák	(Netherlands) Etienne Bax / (Czech Republic) Ondřej Čermák	Result
2	22 May	(Czech Republic) Loket	(Netherlands) Koen Hermans / (France) Nicolas Musset	(Netherlands) Koen Hermans / (France) Nicolas Musset	
2	22 May	(Czech Republic) Loket	(Netherlands) Julian Veldman / (Belgium) Glenn Janssens	(Netherlands) Koen Hermans / (France) Nicolas Musset	
3	26 June	(Belgium) Lommel	(Netherlands) Etienne Bax / (Czech Republic) Ondřej Čermák	(Belgium) Marvin Vanluchene / (Netherlands) Robbie Bax	
3	26 June	(Belgium) Lommel	(Belgium) Marvin Vanluchene / (Netherlands) Robbie Bax	(Belgium) Marvin Vanluchene / (Netherlands) Robbie Bax	
4	3 July	(Estonia) Lange	(Estonia) Kert Varik / (Finland) Lari Kunnas	(Estonia) Kert Varik / (Finland) Lari Kunnas	
4	3 July	(Estonia) Lange	(Estonia) Kert Varik / (Finland) Lari Kunnas	(Estonia) Kert Varik / (Finland) Lari Kunnas	
5	4 September	(Czech Republic) Kaplice	(Netherlands) Etienne Bax / (Czech Republic) Ondřej Čermák	(Belgium) Marvin Vanluchene / (Netherlands) Robbie Bax	
5	4 September	(Czech Republic) Kaplice	(Belgium) Marvin Vanluchene / (Netherlands) Robbie Bax	(Belgium) Marvin Vanluchene / (Netherlands) Robbie Bax	
6	18 September	(Germany) Rudersberg	(Netherlands) Etienne Bax / (Czech Republic) Ondřej Čermák	(Belgium) Marvin Vanluchene / (Netherlands) Robbie Bax	
6	18 September	(Germany) Rudersberg	(Belgium) Marvin Vanluchene / (Netherlands) Robbie Bax	(Belgium) Marvin Vanluchene / (Netherlands) Robbie Bax	

== Standings ==
The top ten teams in the standings:

Position	Driver / Passenger	Equipment	Bike No.	Points
1	(Netherlands) Etienne Bax / (Czech Republic) Ondřej Čermák	Husqvarna-WSP	82	239
2	(Estonia) Kert Varik / (Finland) Lari Kunnas	AMS-WSP	5	235
3	(Belgium) Marvin Vanluchene / (Netherlands) Robbie Bax	Zabel-WSP	2	217
4	(Netherlands) Gert van Werven / (Netherlands) Ben van den Bogaart	TM Racing-WSP	11	179
5	(Netherlands) Koen Hermans / (France) Nicolas Musset	AMS-WSP	3	175
6	(Netherlands) Julian Veldman / (Belgium) Glenn Janssens	Mega-WSP	31	141
7	(United Kingdom) Brett Wilkinson / (United Kingdom) Joe Millard	AMS-WSP	199	139
8	(Estonia) Gert Gordejev / (Latvia) Kaspars Stupelis	Husqvarna-WSP	151	118
9	(Switzerland) Marco Heinzer / (Switzerland) Rüdi Betschart	KTM-VMC	93	109
10	(United Kingdom) Dan Foden / (United Kingdom) Nathan Cooper	Zabel-WSP	92	98

=== Riders Championship ===
Pos.	Bike No.	Driver / Passenger	Equipment	NED (Netherlands)		CZE (Czech Republic)		BEL (Belgium)		EST (Estonia)		CZE (Czech Republic)		GER (Germany)		Points
1	82	(Netherlands) Etienne Bax / (Czech Republic) Ondřej Čermák	Husqvarna-WSP	1	1	2	19	1	4	3	11	1	3	1	2	239
2	5	(Estonia) Kert Varik / (Finland) Lari Kunnas	AMS-WSP	3	2	10	4	3	2	1	1	5	4	3	4	235
3	2	(Belgium) Marvin Vanluchene / (Netherlands) Robbie Bax	Zabel-WSP	5	26	Ret	3	4	1	2	2	2	1	2	1	217
4	11	(Netherlands) Gert van Werven / (Netherlands) Ben van den Bogaart	TM Racing-WSP	4	6	3	7	9	5	5	4	4	5	5	24	179
5	3	(Netherlands) Koen Hermans / (France) Nicolas Musset	AMS-WSP	DNS	DNS	1	2	5	17	4	3	3	2	7	7	175
6	31	(Netherlands) Julian Veldman / (Belgium) Glen Janssens	MEGA-WSP	2	11	12	1	2	3							141
6	31	/ (France) Rodolphe Lebreton	MEGA-WSP											8	3	141
7	199	(United Kingdom) Brett Wilkinson / (United Kingdom) Joe Millard	AMS-WSP	6	3	17	5	17	6	7	19	10	7	13	5	139
8	151	(Estonia) Gert Gordejev / (Latvia) Kaspars Stupelis	Husqvarna-WSP	16	10	Ret	12	Ret	16	6	6	8	6	6	6	139
9	93	(Switzerland) Marco Heinzer / (Switzerland) Rüdi Betschart	KTM-VMC	13	9	6	15	6	9	14	15	6	8			109
10	92	(United Kingdom) Dan Foden / (United Kingdom) Nathan Cooper	Zabel-WSP	9	20	11	10	21	13	11	9	12	Ret	9	8	98
11	418	(Netherlands) Stephan Wijers / (Netherlands) Loet van der Putten	Zabel-VMC	7	7	15	Ret									94
11	418	/ (Netherlands) Jorrit van der Putten	Zabel-VMC					12	8	15	10					94
11	418	/ (Belgium) Eduard Soenens	Zabel-VMC									Ret	9	12	Ret	94
12	888	(United Kingdom) Stuart Brown / (United Kingdom) Josh Chamberlain	AMS-VMC	10	Ret	8	6	8	11			11	Ret	4	Ret	90
13	7	(Netherlands) Justin Keuben / (France) Rodolphe Lebreton	Zabel-VMC	19	4											81
13	7	/ (France) Johnny Badaire	Zabel-VMC			5	8									81
13	7	/ (Netherlands) Dion Rietman	Zabel-VMC					15	Ret			7	21	19	11	81
13	7	/ (Lithuania) Kostas Beleckas	Zabel-VMC							DNS	DNS					81
14	9	(Belgium) Davy Sanders / (France) Luc Rostingt	Zabel-WSP	Ret	5	Ret	11	13	10	9	14	9	Ret			76
15	111	(Netherlands) Daniël Willemsen / (France) Rodolphe Lebreton	Zabel-WSP			7	14	7	7	10	8					73
16	99	(Netherlands) Thom van de Lagemaat / (Belgium) Robbe de Veene	Zabel-WSP	15	13	16	20	Ret	15	19	5	20	12	15	10	71
17	75	(Netherlands) Tim Leferink / (Lithuania) Konstantinas Beleckas	Zabel-VMC	22	21	9	Ret	10	12							69
17	75	/ (Netherlands) Sem Leferink	Zabel-VMC									13	11	11	12	69
18	94	(France) Killian Prunier / (France) Evan Prunier	Zabel-WSP	14	17	4	9	Ret	24			18	10	23	14	62
19	20	(Germany) Adrian Peter / (Belgium) Niki Debruyne	Zabel-WSP	17	18	18	18	18	Ret	12	12	17	Ret	17	13	50
20	100	(United Kingdom) Jake Brown / (United Kingdom) Paul Horton	Zabel-VMC	8	8	Ret	DNS	Ret	14			16	13	21	Ret	46
21	34	(Estonia) Tanel Reesna / (France) Bastien Chopin	Zabel-WSP	21	14											44
21	34	/ (Estonia) Sten Niitsoo	Zabel-WSP					16	21	8	7	24	16	Ret	23	44
22	72	(Netherlands) Frank Mulders / (Netherlands) Aivar van de Wiel	Zabel-WSP	12	12	19	16							Ret	19	27
23	14	(United Kingdom) Gary Moulds / (United Kingdom) Lewis Gray	AMS-WSP											10	9	23
24	177	(United Kingdom) George Kinge / (United Kingdom) Dan Phelps	Zabel-WSP	Ret	15	13	13	DNS	Ret							22
25	98	(Netherlands) Ijen Kops / (Switzerland) Andreas Lenherr	MEGA-WSP	DNS	DNS											20
25	98	/ (Netherlands) Mies de Louw	MEGA-WSP					DNS	Ret							20
25	98	/ (United Kingdom) Dan Phelps	MEGA-WSP									14	20	14	16	20
26	54	(Estonia) Ülar Karing / (Estonia) Oliver Sebastian Lamp	KTM-WSP							13	13	19	Ret			18
27	13	(United Kingdom) Michael Hodges / (United Kingdom) Jack Wilkinson	Zabel-WSP	18	23	DNQ	DNQ	11	22					22	18	16
28	19	(Netherlands) Sven Wisselink / (France) Alexandre Tourbier	Zabel-WSP	Ret	16	22	Ret	22	DNS							16
28	19	/ (Netherlands) Jens Vincent	Zabel-WSP									21	15	20	17	16
29	6	(Czech Republic) Lukáš Černý / (France) Bastien Chopin	Jawa-WSP			20	Ret					15	14	Ret	DNS	14
30	91	(Austria) Benjamin Weiss / (Austria) Patrick Schneider	Zabel-VMC	11	19											12
31	123	(Netherlands) Stacey van der Veldt / (Netherlands) Alex van der Veldt	Husqvarna-WSP	24	25	DNQ	DNQ	DNQ	DNQ	16	16					10
32	223	(Germany) Christian Hentrich / (Germany) Simon Lenz	KTM-VMC											18	15	9
33	17	(Germany) Tim Prummer / (Belgium) Jarno Steegmans	Zabel-WSP					14	20							8
34	23	(Germany) Joachim Reimann / (Switzerland) Martin Betschart	Zabel-VMC	Ret	DNS	14	DNS									7
35	999	(Lithuania) Liutauras Variakojis / (Latvia) Martins Antons	Husqvarna-WSP							18	17					7
36	43	(Estonia) Argo Põldsaar / (Estonia) Teet Eier	KTM-VMC							17	18					7
37	723	(Belgium) Jason van Daele / (Czech Republic) Miroslav Zatloukal	Husqvarna-VMC			Ret	17	Ret	Ret							6
37	723	/ (Belgium) Steve de Schacht	MEGA-WSP									Ret	19			6
38	36	(Germany) Tobias Blank / (Germany) Justin Blume	Zabel-VMC											16	Ret	5
39	97	(Netherlands) Wilfred Vos / (Netherlands) Wessel Susebeek	Zabel-VMC	20	22			19	19							5
40	15	(Czech Republic) Jan Polívka / (Czech Republic) Miroslav Zatloukal	Zabel-WSP									DNS	17			4
41	214	(Belgium) Glenn van der Schraelen / (Belgium) Jens Mans	AMS-VMC					20	18							4
42	41	(Switzerland) Fabian Hofmann / (Switzerland) Marius Strauss	Zabel-VMC	23	24	23	21					23	18	Ret	22	3
43	354	(Germany) Heiko Müller / (Germany) Marco Müller	Zabel-WSP											24	20	1
	26	(Czech Republic) Jan Boukal / (Czech Republic) Radek Vitoň	Zabel-WSP			21	Ret					22	DNS			0
	47	(France) Artis Devoldere / (Belgium) Tony Kramar	Zabel-WSP					Ret	Ret							0
	47	/ (France) Alexandre Tourbier	Zabel-WSP									Ret	Ret	25	21	0
	40	(France) Romaric Chanteloup / (France) Josselyn Chanteloup	Zabel-WSP			DNQ	DNQ									0
	40	/ (France) Simon Villaines	Zabel-WSP					Ret	23					Ret	Ret	0
	48	(Czech Republic) Tomáš Vejchoda / (Czech Republic) Jakub Vejchoda	KTM-WSP			Ret	DNS					Ret	DNS			0
	90	(Czech Republic) Robert Diblík / (Czech Republic) Michal Gábor	Gas Gas-WSP			Ret	DNS					Ret	DNS			0
	127	(Germany) Andre Knubben / (Germany) Simon Lenz	KTM-WSP	Ret	Ret			DNQ	DNQ							0
	61	(Czech Republic) Ladislav Peč / (Czech Republic) Vítězslav Peč	KTM-WSP			DNQ	DNQ					DNQ	Ret			0
	521	(Netherlands) Sam Veldman / (Netherlands) Sten van den Heuij	MEGA	DNS	DNS											0
	88	(Czech Republic) Martin Žižlavský / (Czech Republic) Jan Hanulík	MEGA-WSP			DNQ	DNQ					DNQ	DNQ			0
	189	(Czech Republic) Dominik Vach / (Czech Republic) Lukáš Čiko	MEGA-WSP			DNQ	DNQ									0
	38	(Belgium) Stan Goeyvaerts / (Belgium) Dave Gorris	Zabel-WSP					DNQ	DNQ							0
	12	(Austria) Ewald Schönhofer / (Austria) Ralf Schimpel	MEGA-VMC									DNQ	DNQ			0
	101	(Latvia) Daniels Lielbardis / (Latvia) Bruno Lielbardis	Zabel-WSP									DNQ	DNQ			0
	772	(Switzerland) Sven Buob / (Switzerland) Marc Buob	Zabel-WSP											DNQ	DNQ	0
	79	(Germany) Martin Walter / (Germany) Philipp Frommherz	Zabel-WSP											DNQ	DNQ	0
