= 2022 Formula Regional Americas Championship =

Motor racing competition

The 2022 Formula Regional Americas Championship powered by Honda was the fifth season of a FIA-sanctioned F3 series across North America, and the third season under the Formula Regional moniker after a rebrand in 2020. The series was promoted by SCCA Pro Racing, the professional racing division of the Sports Car Club of America. Drivers competed to win a Honda-backed Super Formula seat in 2023.

After not racing for two full years, Raoul Hyman won the drivers' championship with two races to spare. His team, TJ Speed Motorsports, defended the teams' championship title.

== Teams and drivers ==
All drivers competed with Honda-powered Ligier JS F3 cars on Hankook tires.

Team	No.	Driver	Rounds
(United States) Jensen Global Advisors	2	(Sweden) Oliver Westling	5–6
(United States) IGY6 Motorsports	3	(United States) Hayden Bowlsbey	1–3, 5–6
(United States) Doran-Kroll Racing	8	(United States) Alex Kirby	1–4
(United States) Doran-Kroll Racing	95	(Canada) Marco Kacic	1–3
(United States) Doran-Kroll Racing	96	(United States) Athreya Ramanan	3–4
(United States) Velocity Racing Development	10	(Bolivia) Rodrigo Gutiérrez	1–2, 4–5
(United States) Velocity Racing Development	22	(Canada) Nico Christodoulou	1–2
(United States) Crosslink Kiwi Motorsport	14	(United States) Dylan Tavella	All
(United States) Crosslink Kiwi Motorsport	24	(United States) Kevin Janzen	All
(United States) Crosslink Kiwi Motorsport	78	(New Zealand) Ryan Yardley	All
(United States) Crosslink Kiwi Motorsport	91	(United States) Cooper Becklin	All
(United States) Future Star Racing	25	(Canada) Mac Clark	1–3, 5–6
(United States) Future Star Racing	25	(United States) Aaron Jeansonne	4
(United States) (Australia) TJ Speed Motorsports	27	(South Africa) Raoul Hyman	All
(United States) (Australia) TJ Speed Motorsports	29	(United States) Nick Persing	All
(United States) (Australia) TJ Speed Motorsports	77	(United States) Jason Alder	All

- Alliance Racing was planning to enter the championship, but those plans did not come to fruition.

== Race calendar and results ==
The 2022 calendar was announced on 23 September 2021. Each round featured three races. A pre-season invitational non-points event was scheduled to be held on 24–27 March at Road Atlanta. After a round in Canada was attempted to be held for the last two years, but was cancelled both times, the 2022 schedule once again only consisted of races inside the US.

Round		Circuit	Date	Pole position	Fastest lap	Winning driver	Winning team	Supporting
1	R1	NOLA Motorsports Park, Avondale	9 April	(South Africa) Raoul Hyman	(South Africa) Raoul Hyman	(Canada) Mac Clark	(United States) Future Star Racing	Formula 4 United States Championship; SVRA
1	R2	NOLA Motorsports Park, Avondale	10 April		(South Africa) Raoul Hyman	(South Africa) Raoul Hyman	(United States) (Australia) TJ Speed Motorsports	Formula 4 United States Championship; SVRA
1	R3	NOLA Motorsports Park, Avondale	10 April		(United States) Jason Alder	(United States) Dylan Tavella	(United States) Crosslink Kiwi Motorsport	Formula 4 United States Championship; SVRA
2	R1	Road America, Elkhart Lake	21 May	(South Africa) Raoul Hyman	(South Africa) Raoul Hyman	(South Africa) Raoul Hyman	(United States) (Australia) TJ Speed Motorsports	Formula 4 United States Championship; SVRA
2	R2	Road America, Elkhart Lake	22 May		(South Africa) Raoul Hyman	(United States) Jason Alder	(United States) (Australia) TJ Speed Motorsports	Formula 4 United States Championship; SVRA
2	R3	Road America, Elkhart Lake	22 May		(United States) Jason Alder	(South Africa) Raoul Hyman	(United States) (Australia) TJ Speed Motorsports	Formula 4 United States Championship; SVRA
3	R1	Mid-Ohio Sports Car Course, Lexington	25 June	(South Africa) Raoul Hyman	(South Africa) Raoul Hyman	(South Africa) Raoul Hyman	(United States) (Australia) TJ Speed Motorsports	Formula 4 United States Championship; SVRA; Trans-Am Series
3	R2	Mid-Ohio Sports Car Course, Lexington	26 June		(South Africa) Raoul Hyman	(South Africa) Raoul Hyman	(United States) (Australia) TJ Speed Motorsports	Formula 4 United States Championship; SVRA; Trans-Am Series
3	R3	Mid-Ohio Sports Car Course, Lexington	26 June		(Canada) Mac Clark	(South Africa) Raoul Hyman	(United States) (Australia) TJ Speed Motorsports	Formula 4 United States Championship; SVRA; Trans-Am Series
4	R1	New Jersey Motorsports Park, Millville	30 July	(South Africa) Raoul Hyman	(South Africa) Raoul Hyman	(South Africa) Raoul Hyman	(United States) (Australia) TJ Speed Motorsports	Formula 4 United States Championship; SVRA
4	R2	New Jersey Motorsports Park, Millville	30 July		(United States) Dylan Tavella	(United States) Dylan Tavella	(United States) Crosslink Kiwi Motorsport	Formula 4 United States Championship; SVRA
4	R3	New Jersey Motorsports Park, Millville	31 July		(South Africa) Raoul Hyman	(United States) Dylan Tavella	(United States) Crosslink Kiwi Motorsport	Formula 4 United States Championship; SVRA
5	R1	Virginia International Raceway, Alton	8 October	(South Africa) Raoul Hyman	(South Africa) Raoul Hyman	(United States) Jason Alder	(United States) (Australia) TJ Speed Motorsports	Formula 4 United States Championship; SVRA; Trans-Am Series
5	R2	Virginia International Raceway, Alton	8 October		(South Africa) Raoul Hyman	(South Africa) Raoul Hyman	(United States) (Australia) TJ Speed Motorsports	Formula 4 United States Championship; SVRA; Trans-Am Series
5	R3	Virginia International Raceway, Alton	9 October		(United States) Cooper Becklin	(South Africa) Raoul Hyman	(United States) (Australia) TJ Speed Motorsports	Formula 4 United States Championship; SVRA; Trans-Am Series
6	R1	Circuit of the Americas, Austin	3 November	(South Africa) Raoul Hyman	(United States) Jason Alder	(South Africa) Raoul Hyman	(United States) (Australia) TJ Speed Motorsports	Formula 4 United States Championship; SVRA; Trans-Am Series
6	R2	Circuit of the Americas, Austin	3 November		(South Africa) Raoul Hyman	(United States) Jason Alder	(United States) (Australia) TJ Speed Motorsports	Formula 4 United States Championship; SVRA; Trans-Am Series
6	R3	Circuit of the Americas, Austin	4 November		(South Africa) Raoul Hyman	(South Africa) Raoul Hyman	(United States) (Australia) TJ Speed Motorsports	Formula 4 United States Championship; SVRA; Trans-Am Series

== Season summary ==
The championship began in early April at NOLA Motorsports Park with Raoul Hyman topping the qualifying session on his return to single seater racing. Mac Clark started alongside him for race one, and was faster off the line to take the race lead. Hyman put pressure on Clark at different points throughout the race, but was not able to make a pass. Dylan Tavella completed the podium, more than 25 seconds behind. Hyman fared better in race two, converting pole to victory. Behind him, Clark and Tavella fought for second place, with Tavella eventually coming through. The third race saw Hyman once again lose his lead at the start. This time, he slipped back to third, behind eventual race winner Tavella and Jason Alder. Hyman and Tavella left Avondale equal on points, with Clark eight points behind in third.

Round two of the season was held at Road America, and Hyman was on pole again by almost a second. Nico Christodoulou started second, but stalled at the start of race one and Hayden Bowlsbey crashed into him. This promoted Tavella into second place, and Ryan Yardley completed the podium after battling past Alder and Clark. Race two saw Hyman hold his lead once again, while behind him Alder, Clark and Tavella fought for second. Hyman then spun with two laps to go, gifting Alder the win but still finishing second ahead of Tavella. Hyman recovered to dominate race three. Christodoulou in second went off while battling Tavella, and Alder and Nick Persing then came through to round out the podium. Hyman's strong weekend saw him pick up the championship lead, 23 points ahead of his nearest challenger Tavella.

Next up was Lexington's Mid-Ohio Sports Car Course, and Hyman continued his pole position streak. He and Alder kept first and second place in race one until a late caution bunched the grid back up. This enabled Persing to get past Alder for second, but Hyman could not be stopped. Race two saw a similar domination by Hyman, this time against Clark in second with Persing gaining to positions to finish third. Damp conditions saw eight drivers start race three on wet tyres. Hyman among them was in a league of his own, putting 51 seconds between him and the rest of the field. Slick tyres came into play when the track dried up, and Clark went on a charge, before it started to rain again and he went off. Tavella and Cooper Becklin came second and third. His perfect weekend with a pole and three wins saw Hyman extend his championship lead to 58 points.

Teams and drivers then headed to New Jersey Motorsports Park, where qualifying was once again topped by Hyman. The first race was a simple affair for the poleman as he lapped all bar the top eight drivers. Tavella moved past Yardley at the start and the pair finished second and third. Race two proved more challenging for Hyman, as his charge was interrupted by two caution periods, so Tavella was able to keep close behind him and then pass him for the race win on the last lap. Yardley came third again. Tavella started race three from pole, and fought Hyman off in a close battle that lasted until the final lap, as the pair crossed the line 0.089s apart. The only driver that managed to stick with the duo was Persing in third place. Tavella's two wins meant he outscored Hyman, slightly cutting down his lead to 51 points.

The penultimate round of the season at Virginia International Raceway began with the now familiar sight of Hyman on pole position for race one. At the start, Persing and Alder fought for second, with Persing locking up into turn one, colliding with Hyman and spinning him around. This promoted Alder into the lead, and Hyman had to climb through the order. He did so, only to hit the barriers on the penultimate lap. Alder won the race ahead of Yardley and Tavella. Race two and three were two rather simple lights-to-flag affairs for Hyman. He kept Alder and Tavella at bay in race two and defended against Tavella in race three, before the latter had to pit with an issue. That promoted Yardley into second, before he got overtaken by Becklin. With 75 points on offer at Austin, Hyman had one hand on the championship with his 70-point lead.

Hyman completed his perfect qualifying record with a sixth pole at Circuit of the Americas, this time by over a second. Tavella was able to overtake him on the opening lap of race one, but Hyman was able to take back the lead on lap 13. Tavella came second ahead of Yardley as Hyman claimed the championship title. The second race saw a similar story in reverse, this time Hyman picked up the lead from Alder at the start, but was later repassed when he had a mechanical issue that forced his retirement. The podium for race two was completed by Persing and Tavella. The last race of the season saw Hyman claim his eleventh win of the season in a lights-to-flag race. Oliver Westling came second in only his second weekend in the category, and Yardley rounded out the top three.

== Championship standings ==
Points were awarded as follows:

Position	**1st**	**2nd**	**3rd**	**4th**	**5th**	**6th**	**7th**	**8th**	**9th**	**10th**
Points	25	18	15	12	10	8	6	4	2	1

=== Drivers' standings ===
Pos	Driver	NOL			ROA			MOH			NJM			VIR			COA			Pts
Pos	Driver	R1	R2	R3	R1	R2	R3	R1	R2	R3	R1	R2	R3	R1	R2	R3	R1	R2	R3	Pts
1	(South Africa) Raoul Hyman	**2**	1	3	**1**	2	1	**1**	1	1	**1**	2	2	**11**†	1	1	**1**	Ret	1	362
2	(United States) Dylan Tavella	3	2	1	2	3	4	5	4	2	2	1	1	3	3	10	2	3	7	281
3	(United States) Jason Alder	5	NC	2	4	1	2	3	5	5	8	5	Ret	1	2	9	5	1	6	220
4	(New Zealand) Ryan Yardley	6	5	4	3	Ret	6	4	6	4	3	3	6	2	7	3	3	4	3	204
5	(United States) Nick Persing	7	4	6	5	Ret	3	2	3	7	5	4	7	7	4	8	6	2	4	178
6	(Canada) Mac Clark	1	3	5	7	5	8	7	2	6				4	5	4	4	6	8	160
7	(United States) Cooper Becklin	NC	8	10	8	7	7	8	7	3	4	6	4	5	6	2	7	9	5	132
8	(Sweden) Oliver Westling													8	9	5	8	5	2	48
9	(Canada) Nico Christodoulou	4	6	9	Ret	4	5													44
10	(Bolivia) Rodrigo Gutiérrez	10	9	Ret	10	6	9				7	Ret	8	9	10	6				35
11	(United States) Hayden Bowlsbey	Ret	11	Ret	Ret	DNS	11	6	DNS	8				6	8	Ret	9	7	DNS	32
12	(Canada) Marco Kacic	8	7	7	6	Ret	10	9	11	9										29
13	(United States) Aaron Jeansonne										6	9	3							25
14	(United States) Alex Kirby	9	10	8	9	8	12	10	8	10	10	8	Ret							24
15	(United States) Athreya Ramanan							Ret	9	NC	9	7	5							20
16	(United States) Kevin Janzen	11	12	11	11	9	13	11	10	NC	11	Ret	Ret	10	11	7	10	8	9	17
Pos	Driver	R1	R2	R3	R1	R2	R3	R1	R2	R3	R1	R2	R3	R1	R2	R3	R1	R2	R3	Pts
Pos	Driver	NOL			ROA			MOH			NJM			VIR			COA			Pts

Colour	Result
Gold	Winner
Silver	Second place
Bronze	Third place
Green	Points classification
Blue	Non-points classification
Blue	Non-classified finish (NC)
Purple	Retired, not classified (Ret)
Red	Did not qualify (DNQ)
Red	Did not pre-qualify (DNPQ)
Black	Disqualified (DSQ)
White	Did not start (DNS)
White	Withdrew (WD)
White	Race cancelled (C)
Blank	Did not practice (DNP)
Blank	Did not arrive (DNA)
Blank	Excluded (EX)

**Bold** – Pole

Italics – Fastest Lap

† — Did not finish, but classified

=== Teams' standings ===
Only a team's two best-finishing cars were eligible for teams' championship points.

Pos	Team	NOL			ROA			MOH			NJM			VIR			COA			Pts
Pos	Team	R1	R2	R3	R1	R2	R3	R1	R2	R3	R1	R2	R3	R1	R2	R3	R1	R2	R3	Pts
1	(United States) (Australia) TJ Speed Motorsports	2	1	2	1	1	1	1	1	1	1	2	2	1	1	1	1	1	1	652
1	(United States) (Australia) TJ Speed Motorsports	5	4	3	4	2	2	2	3	5	5	4	7	7	2	8	5	2	4	652
2	(United States) Crosslink Kiwi Motorsport	3	2	1	2	3	4	4	4	2	2	1	1	2	3	2	2	3	3	525
2	(United States) Crosslink Kiwi Motorsport	6	5	4	3	7	6	5	6	3	3	3	4	3	6	3	3	4	5	525
3	(United States) Future Star Racing	1	3	5	7	5	8	7	2	6	6	9	3	4	5	4	4	6	8	186
4	(United States) Velocity Racing Development	4	6	9	10	4	5				7	Ret	8	9	10	6				83
4	(United States) Velocity Racing Development	10	9	Ret	Ret	6	9													83
5	(United States) Doran-Kroll Racing	8	7	7	6	8	10	9	8	9	9	7	5							77
5	(United States) Doran-Kroll Racing	9	10	8	9	Ret	12	10	9	10	10	8	Ret							77
6	(United States) Jensen Global Advisors													8	9	5	8	5	2	48
7	(United States) IGY6 Motorsports	Ret	11	Ret	Ret	DNS	11	6	DNS	8				6	8	Ret	9	7	DNS	33
Pos	Team	R1	R2	R3	R1	R2	R3	R1	R2	R3	R1	R2	R3	R1	R2	R3	R1	R2	R3	Pts
Pos	Team	NOL			ROA			MOH			NJM			VIR			COA			Pts
