= 2025 USF2000 Championship =

Racing season

The 2025 USF2000 Championship presented by Continental Tire was the sixteenth season of the USF2000 Championship since its revival in 2010. The championship serves as the second rung of the IndyCar Series's USF Pro Championships ladder system.

Exclusive Autosport's Jack Jeffers won the Drivers' Championship at the penultimate race of the season, while VRD Racing, the team who fielded Jeffers' two closest competitors, won the Teams' Championship.

== Series news ==
- The scholarship for the champion was decreased by over $50,000 to $405,050.
- The power output by the Elite Mazda engines on road and street circuits was increased, with a heightened rev limit resulting in a power increase of 20 horsepower at the top end.

== Drivers and teams ==
All drivers competed using Tatuus USF-22 racecars with Elite Mazda 2.0-014A engines and Continental tires.

Team	No.	Driver(s)	Status	Round(s)
Benchmark Autosport	58	(United States) Ayrton Houk		1–13
DEForce Racing	11	(United States) Jeshua Alianell	R	All
DEForce Racing	12	(Colombia) Sebastián Garzón	R	All
DEForce Racing	15	(Mexico) Patricio González	R	6–10, 14–15
DEForce Racing	17	(United States) Thomas Nordquist	R	9–10
DEForce Racing	17	(United States) Vaughn Mishko	R	11–13, 16–18
DEForce Racing	18	(United States) Brady Golan		1–5
DEForce Racing	18	(Mexico) Rodrigo González	R	6–10, 14–15
ENVE Motorsports	21	(United States) Spencer Hancock	R	16–18
Exclusive Autosport	90	(United States) Evan Cooley	R	All
Exclusive Autosport	91	(Brazil) Lucas Fecury		All
Exclusive Autosport	92	(United States) Jack Jeffers	R	All
Exclusive Autosport	94	(United States) Brenden Cooley	R	9–10
Exclusive Autosport	95	(United States) Kaylee Countryman	R	9–10, 14–15
Jay Howard Driver Development	6	(United Kingdom) Liam McNeilly	R	1–7
Jay Howard Driver Development	6	(United States) JT Hoskins	R	9–10
Jay Howard Driver Development	7	(Australia) Brad Majman	R	1–8, 11–18
Jay Howard Driver Development	7	(United Kingdom) Harley Keeble	R	9–10
Jay Howard Driver Development	8	(France) Timothy Carel	R	All
Jay Howard Driver Development	9	(Canada) Anthony Martella	R	All
Pabst Racing	23	(United States) George Argyros III		All
Pabst Racing	24	(United States) Caleb Gafrarar	R	All
Sarah Fisher Hartman Racing	67	(South Africa) Wian Boshoff	R	1–15
Sarah Fisher Hartman Racing	68	(United States) Simon Sikes		6–7
Sarah Fisher Hartman Racing	68	(United States) Elliot Cox		8
Synergy Motorsport	30	(Australia) Eddie Beswick	R	All
VRD Racing	2	(United States) Thomas Schrage		All
VRD Racing	19	(United States) Christian Cameron	R	All
VRD Racing	25	(United States) Teddy Musella	R	All
VRD Racing	99	(United States) Ryan Giannetta	R	1–7, 9–18

Icon	Status
R	Rookie

=== Team changes ===
Both DC Autosport and DD Autosports left the series - DD Autosports had entered the series in 2024, while DC Autosport had been competing since 2023.

Two new teams entered the series in Benchmark Autosport and Synergy Motorsport, both entering one car each.

=== Driver changes ===
Reigning Teams' Champions Pabst Racing had an all new driver-lineup after they promoted Drivers' Champion Max Garcia to their USF Pro 2000 lineup and both Hudson Schwartz and Sam Corry left the series. The team signed two drivers for their full-time debuts in G3 Argyros, who entered ten races in 2024 driving for Jay Howard Driver Development, and Caleb Gafrarar, who stepped up from competition in the FF1600 United Formula Ford series.

Only one of Jay Howard Driver Development's six 2024 drivers remained with the team's USF2000 outfit as Evagoras Papasavvas made the jump up to Indy NXT for a part-time campaign with HMD Motorsports, G3 Argyros and Michael Costello both joined Pabst Racing in USF2000 and USFP2000 respectively, while Tanner DeFabis was promoted to JHDD's USFP2000 outfit and Jace Bacon left the series. Three new drivers joined JHDD for the 2025 season: Timothy Carel was promoted from the team's USF Juniors outfit, while Anthony Martella also graduated from the same series after driving there for Exclusive Autosport and Brad Majman stepped up from the Ligier JS F4 Series.

VRD Racing also only kept one of its 2024 drivers: Thomas Schrage, who drove for the team in the second half of the 2024 season, was resigned for a full-time campaign, while Max Taylor stepped up to VRD's USFP2000 outfit alongside a part-time Indy NXT campaign with HMD Motorsports and Xavier Kokai did not return after ending his rookie season prematurely. The team promoted Christian Cameron from its USF Juniors program and signed reigning Ligier JS F4 Series champion Teddy Musella as well as Skip Barber Formula competitor Ryan Giannetta.

DEForce Racing saw Lucas Fecury move to Exclusive Autosport, while Nicolas Giaffone left single-seater racing to compete in the Copa Truck and Qinn Armstrong left the series. Two drivers joined the team to make their USF2000 debut in Jeshua Alianell, who stepped up from USF Juniors, and Sebastián Garzón, who made his single-seater racing debut.

Three of Exclusive Racing's drivers joined other teams in the series: Eddie Beswick moved to new entrant Synergy Motorsport, Thomas Schrage chose to remain at VRD where he also finished his 2024 campaign and Anthony Martella was hired by JHDD. 2024 Rookie of the Year Joey Brienza meanwhile stepped up to the team's USFP2000 outfit, while Giovanni Cabrera left the series. Exclusive Racing rehired two of their part-time drivers of 2024 to full-time campaigns in Jack Jeffers and Evan Cooley and signed Lucas Fecury, who departed DEForce Racing, to drive its third entry.

Sarah Fisher Hartman Racing saw Elliot Cox graduate to USFP2000 and join Turn 3 Motorsport. The team hired single-seater rookie Wian Boshoff to replace him.

With DC Autosport and DD Autosport departing the series, Carson Etter and Cole Kleck also left the series while new team Benchmark Autosport signed DC Autosport's Ayrton Houk. The other new team, Synergy Motorsport, signed 2024 Australian Formula Ford Series champion Eddie Beswick, who had also entered two USF2000 races in 2024 for Exclusive Racing.

==== Mid-season ====
Brady Golan left DEForce Racing and the series ahead of the round at Indianapolis as he made the mid-season step up to USF Pro 2000 with Turn 3 Motorsport. In his stead, the team fielded two drivers making the respective step up to USF2000 in the brothers Patricio and Rodrigo González. Sarah Fisher Hartman Racing meanwhile enlisted 2023 champion Simon Sikes to drive a second car for the event alongside Wian Boshoff.

After winning the first five races in a row, then-championship leader Liam McNeilly encountered visa issues when returning to the US ahead of round 6. That saw him withdraw from the Grand Prix of Indianapolis before being forced to end his campaign altogether. Ryan Giannetta also missed the round at IRP, as did Simon Sikes. In his stead, Sarah Fisher Hartman Racing fielded Elliot Cox, who returned to the team after a two-race step up to USF Pro 2000 at the Grand Prix of St. Petersburg.

Majman did not enter the Grand Prix of Road America, while Cox departed the series after his one-race outing and Giannetta returned. That round also saw the series debut of five drivers: Thomas Nordqvist (DEForce Racing), JT Hoskins (JHDD), Brenden Cooley and Kaylee Countryman (Exclusive Autosport) all made the step up from USF Juniors, while Harley Keeble made his series debut for JHDD.

All five of Road America's series debutants as well as the two González brothers did not enter the Grand Prix of Mid-Ohio. Majman meanwhile returned to the No. 7 JHDD car, while DEForce Racing saw the series debut of Mazda MX-5 Cup driver Vaughn Mishko in their No. 17 car.

Mishko did not return for the Grand Prix of Toronto, while Benchmark's Ayrton Houk was also absent. Kaylee Countryman meanwhile was back in the No. 95 Exclusive Autosport car for a second race weekend after her debut at Road America, and both González brothers also returned to DEForce Racing.

Countryman and the González brothers stepped back down to USF Juniors for the Portland finale, while Boshoff and Sarah Fisher Hartman Racing were also absent. Mishko meanwhile returned for another outing in the No. 17 DEForce Racing entry, while ENVE Motorsport also joined the championship for the final round ahead of their full-season debut in 2026, fielding debutant Spencer Hancock.

== Schedule ==
The 2025 schedule was revealed on September 17, 2024. The championship visited the same eight circuits as it did in 2024: two street circuits, five road courses and one oval. All rounds except the weekend at Avondale, LA (NOLA Motorsports Park) ran in support of the IndyCar Series. The Lucas Oil Indianapolis Raceway Park round, while officially separate, was held as part of the Carb Night Classic, held after Carburetion Day practice at the nearby Indianapolis Motor Speedway.

Icon	Legend
O	Oval/Speedway
R	Road course
S	Street circuit

Rd.	Date	Race name	Track	Location
1	February 28–March 2	Foundation Building Materials Grand Prix of St. Petersburg	S Streets of St. Petersburg	St. Petersburg, Florida
2	February 28–March 2	Foundation Building Materials Grand Prix of St. Petersburg	S Streets of St. Petersburg	St. Petersburg, Florida
3	April 11–13	Continental Tire Grand Prix of Louisiana	R NOLA Motorsports Park	Avondale, Louisiana
4	April 11–13	Continental Tire Grand Prix of Louisiana	R NOLA Motorsports Park	Avondale, Louisiana
5	April 11–13	Continental Tire Grand Prix of Louisiana	R NOLA Motorsports Park	Avondale, Louisiana
6	May 8–10	VP Racing Grand Prix of Indianapolis	R Indianapolis Motor Speedway Road Course	Speedway, Indiana
7	May 8–10	VP Racing Grand Prix of Indianapolis	R Indianapolis Motor Speedway Road Course	Speedway, Indiana
8	May 22–23	Continental Tire Freedom 75	O Lucas Oil Indianapolis Raceway Park	Brownsburg, Indiana
9	June 19–22	Elite Engines Grand Prix of Road America	R Road America	Elkhart Lake, Wisconsin
10	June 19–22	Elite Engines Grand Prix of Road America	R Road America	Elkhart Lake, Wisconsin
11	July 3–6	PFC Grand Prix of Mid-Ohio	R Mid-Ohio Sports Car Course	Lexington, Ohio
12	July 3–6	PFC Grand Prix of Mid-Ohio	R Mid-Ohio Sports Car Course	Lexington, Ohio
13	July 3–6	PFC Grand Prix of Mid-Ohio	R Mid-Ohio Sports Car Course	Lexington, Ohio
14	July 18–20	Continental Tire Grand Prix of Toronto	S Exhibition Place	Toronto, Ontario
15	July 18–20	Continental Tire Grand Prix of Toronto	S Exhibition Place	Toronto, Ontario
16	August 7–10	Continental Tire Grand Prix of Portland	R Portland International Raceway	Portland, Oregon
17	August 7–10	Continental Tire Grand Prix of Portland	R Portland International Raceway	Portland, Oregon
18	August 7–10	Continental Tire Grand Prix of Portland	R Portland International Raceway	Portland, Oregon

== Race results ==
Rd.	Track	Pole position	Fastest lap	Most laps led	Race winner	
Rd.	Track	Pole position	Fastest lap	Most laps led	Driver	Team
1	Streets of St. Petersburg	(United States) Caleb Gafrarar	(United Kingdom) Liam McNeilly	(United Kingdom) Liam McNeilly	(United Kingdom) Liam McNeilly	Jay Howard Driver Development
2	Streets of St. Petersburg	(United Kingdom) Liam McNeilly	(United States) Jack Jeffers	(United Kingdom) Liam McNeilly	(United Kingdom) Liam McNeilly	Jay Howard Driver Development
3	NOLA Motorsports Park	(United Kingdom) Liam McNeilly	(United Kingdom) Liam McNeilly	(United Kingdom) Liam McNeilly	(United Kingdom) Liam McNeilly	Jay Howard Driver Development
4	NOLA Motorsports Park	(United Kingdom) Liam McNeilly	(United Kingdom) Liam McNeilly	(United Kingdom) Liam McNeilly	(United Kingdom) Liam McNeilly	Jay Howard Driver Development
5	NOLA Motorsports Park	(United Kingdom) Liam McNeilly	(United Kingdom) Liam McNeilly	(United Kingdom) Liam McNeilly	(United Kingdom) Liam McNeilly	Jay Howard Driver Development
6	Indianapolis Motor Speedway Road Course	(United States) Teddy Musella	(United States) Teddy Musella	(United States) Jack Jeffers	(United States) Jack Jeffers	Exclusive Autosport
7	Indianapolis Motor Speedway Road Course	(United States) Teddy Musella	(United States) Thomas Schrage	(United States) Thomas Schrage	(United States) Thomas Schrage	VRD Racing
8	Lucas Oil Indianapolis Raceway Park	(United States) Ayrton Houk	(Canada) Anthony Martella	(Canada) Anthony Martella	(Canada) Anthony Martella	Jay Howard Driver Development
9	Road America	(United States) Jack Jeffers	(United States) G3 Argyros	(United States) Teddy Musella	(United States) Thomas Schrage	VRD Racing
10	Road America	(United States) Jack Jeffers	(United States) Jack Jeffers	(United States) Teddy Musella	(United States) Teddy Musella	VRD Racing
11	Mid-Ohio Sports Car Course	(United States) Thomas Schrage	(United States) Teddy Musella	(United States) Caleb Gafrarar	(United States) Caleb Gafrarar	Pabst Racing
12	Mid-Ohio Sports Car Course	(United States) Thomas Schrage	(Colombia) Sebastián Garzón	(United States) Jack Jeffers	(United States) Jack Jeffers	Exclusive Autosport
13	Mid-Ohio Sports Car Course	(United States) Thomas Schrage	(United States) Evan Cooley	(United States) Jack Jeffers	(United States) Jack Jeffers	Exclusive Autosport
14	Exhibition Place	(United States) Thomas Schrage	(United States) Jack Jeffers	(United States) Thomas Schrage (United States) Jack Jeffers	(United States) Jack Jeffers	Exclusive Autosport
15	Exhibition Place	(United States) Jack Jeffers	(United States) Jack Jeffers	(United States) Jack Jeffers	(United States) Jack Jeffers	Exclusive Autosport
16	Portland International Raceway	(United States) Thomas Schrage	(United States) Thomas Schrage	(United States) Thomas Schrage	(United States) Thomas Schrage	VRD Racing
17	Portland International Raceway	(United States) Jack Jeffers	(United States) Jack Jeffers	(United States) Jack Jeffers	(United States) Jack Jeffers	Exclusive Autosport
18	Portland International Raceway	(United States) Jack Jeffers	(United States) Thomas Schrage	(United States) Jack Jeffers	(United States) Teddy Musella	VRD Racing

== Season report ==
=== First half ===
The 2025 USF2000 Championship began with Pabst Racing’s Caleb Gafrarar and JHDD’s Liam McNeilly sharing pole positions around the Streets of St. Petersburg. The opening race began with a caution, and McNeilly used the restart to take the lead off of Gafrarar. The latter kept close to the leader, but made a mistake on lap three that saw him crash into the wall and retire. That promoted Exclusive Autosport’s Jack Jeffers to second, and he pressured McNeilly for the rest of the race but found no way past. DEForce Racing’s Jeshua Alianell rounded out the podium. Race two saw Jeffers start fourth, but he immediately moved to second at the start to resume his battle with McNeilly. This time, the Briton had a clearer advantage and finished the race 2.7 seconds in front to end the weekend with a 13-point lead over Jeffers, while race one polesitter Gafrarar came third.

Next up was a triple-header at NOLA Motorsports Park, where McNeilly swept both qualifying sessions to take pole position for all three races. He spent the opening part of the first race gapping the field before JHDD’s Anthony Martella crashed and caused a caution. The polesitter was faultless at the restart, leaving Jeffers, JHDD’s Brad Majman, Gafrarar and VRD’s Thomas Schrage to fight over second place. Jeffers was eventually ahead and finished 4 seconds behind McNeilly, with Schrage in third. The second race of the weekend saw a different leader for the first time all weekend when Exclusive Autosport’s Evan Cooley went past McNeilly at the start. That only lasted for one lap, however, before the Briton was back in front. A battle for the lead was interrupted by Schrage moving into third and pressuring Cooley. He got past on lap 13, but by that point, McNeilly had an unassailable lead. Race three began under caution when DEForce’s Brady Golan retired on the formation lap. When the race got underway on lap two, McNeilly was never threatened, taking his fifth race win in a row and building up a 51-point lead. Schrage started second and had to work hard all race to keep Pabst’s G3 Argyros behind him.

Indianapolis Motor Speedway’s road course would bring new winners for the first time in 2025 as McNeilly was forced to withdraw from the event due to visa issues. VRD’s Teddy Musella claimed pole position for both races, but lost the lead of the first race after running wide in turn one. Jeffers took the lead and led throughout a caution after a collision between Alianell and VRD’s Christian Cameron. Jeffers took his maiden win ahead of Schrage and Argyros, while Musella managed to recover back to fourth after falling all the way down the order on the first lap. The second race also began with him losing his lead, this time on lap two and with Schrage benefitting. A pair of safety car periods then compressed the field. Schrage held off Musella and Jeffers to also take his maiden win. Jeffers’ podiums earned him the championship lead on 165 points, two clear of McNeilly.

Benchmark Autosport’s Ayrton Houk took pole position for the Freedom 75 at IRP, ahead of Martella. Houk initially led, but Martella closed in quickly and took the lead on lap 13, with Schrage moving into second shortly after. Houk dropped steadily through the field as Martella built a commanding lead. JHDD’s Brad Majman charged from 11th on the grid to secure third place at the finish. With Jeffers starting and finishing the race in ninth, Schrage was able to take the championship lead, seven points ahead of Jeffers.

Road America marked the season’s half-way point, and Jeffers secured pole position for both races. In the opening race, he led from early on but crashed out in a battle with Musella, bringing out the safety car. That handed the lead to Gafrarar, but he was then eliminated in a last-lap clash with Exclusive’s Lucas Fecury. Schrage emerged from the chaos to win, leading home Musella and Argyros. Race two saw Jeffers in the lead again, before a mistake dropped him back, with Cooley and Musella taking over the lead battle. Musella overtook Cooley after the first restart and held on to claim his maiden victory. Cooley finished second, with JHDD’s Harley Keeble charging to third for his first podium in just his second race. Schrage could only manage 13th after a difficult qualifying, but his win in race one still saw him extend his lead in the standings to 27 points over Jeffers.

=== Second half ===
At Mid-Ohio, points leader Schrage dominated qualifying by taking pole for all three races. In the opener, he led early, but a move from Jeffers at turn four sent Schrage wide and dropped him down the order. That opened the door for Gafrarar, who capitalised on the restart after an early caution to move ahead. He pulled away to take his maiden USF2000 victory, with Jeffers remaining second and Schrage coming third. Race two began with incidents before the field even crossed the starting line, and once racing settled, Jeffers battled past Schrage for the lead. Schrage was then shuffled backwards in the pack before being caught up in another clash that forced him to pit, eventually finishing 11th. Up front, Jeffers held off late pressure from Gafrarar to secure his second win of the season, with Musella completing the podium. The final race saw Schrage once again hold the early advantage from pole position, but Jeffers seized the lead with a decisive move at turn four on lap three. A mid-race caution briefly neutralised the action, after which Schrage shadowed Jeffers to the finish, while Musella was third again. Leaving Mid-Ohio, Jeffers and Schrage sat tied on 288 points, with Jeffers ahead on win countback.

The penultimate round, held around Exhibition Place, saw Schrage take pole position for the first race, with Jeffers only fifth. Schrage converted his pole into an early lead, but after a caution on lap three Jeffers climbed into contention. He passed Musella and then pressured Schrage, who made contact with the wall and dropped back. Jeffers went on to win, while Synergy Motorsport’s Eddie Beswick secured a maiden podium in second and Musella completed the top three. Race two was held in damp conditions and began under caution, with several drivers including Schrage brushing the wall and pitting early on. Jeffers led from pole position through a series of restarts, building a gap as Majman and Argyros battled behind him. Gafrarar moved through to finish second, while Argyros held third. Schrage retired again, and the double win saw Jeffers build a 51-point lead.

Portland hosted the season finale, and Schrage narrowly beat Jeffers to pole position for race one. At the start of race one, Schrage held firm before a crash behind brought out the red flag. On the restart Schrage built an early gap, but Jeffers closed back up in the latter stages. Schrage absorbed the pressure to win and keep his title hopes alive as Musella took third. Jeffers’ second-best qualifying time put him in pole position for race two ahead of Musella. He led from the start as Musella ran wide, allowing Cooley into second before he fell back and DEForce’s Sebastián Garzón took the place. Jeffers built a gap as Schrage moved into second, but the leader was too far out by then. Jeffers took both the race win and the championship. A late mistake from Garzón handed third place to Musella. Jeffers had pole position again for race three. Schrage climbed to third early on but was handed a drive-through penalty for first-corner contact. Up front Musella shadowed Jeffers, attacked him, and was eventually waved through by race control after being blocked. He then held the lead to the finish. Garzón completed the podium, while Schrage recovered to 13th, but fell one point short of second in the standings.

Rookie Jeffers emerged as champion with six victories, seven additional podium finishes, and five pole positions, sealing the title at Portland after a mid-season surge that included four consecutive wins across Mid-Ohio and Toronto. The early part of the season however had been dominated by McNeilly, who went unbeaten in the first five races before visa issues forced an end to his campaign. Thomas Schrage then took over at the front, stringing together six consecutive podiums from NOLA through Road America and drawing level on points with Jeffers at Mid-Ohio. His title challenge faltered with a double retirement in Toronto, while Teddy Musella rose steadily: He claimed a maiden win at Road America and never finished outside the top four thereafter. A decisive victory in the Portland finale then enabled Musella to edge Schrage to runner-up in the championship.

== Championship standings ==
=== Drivers' Championship ===
Scoring system

Position	**1st**	**2nd**	**3rd**	**4th**	**5th**	**6th**	**7th**	**8th**	**9th**	**10th**	**11th**	**12th**	**13th**	**14th**	**15th**	**16th**	**17th**	**18th**	**19th**	**20th+**
Points	30	25	22	19	17	15	14	13	12	11	10	9	8	7	6	5	4	3	2	1
Points (O)	45	38	33	29	26	23	21	20	18	17	15	14	12	11	9	8	6	5	3	2

- The driver who qualified on pole was awarded one additional point.
- One point was awarded to the driver who led the most laps in a race.
- One point was awarded to the driver who set the fastest lap during the race.

Pos.	Driver	STP		NOLA			IMS		IRP	ROA		MOH			TOR		POR			Points
1	(United States) Jack Jeffers	2	2	2	5	4	1*	3	9	**22**	**7**	2	1*	1*	1*	**1***	2	**1***	**2***	438
2	(United States) Teddy Musella	14	8	5	8	6	**4**	**2**	6	2*	1*	4	3	3	3	4	3	3	1	371
3	(United States) Thomas Schrage	12	7	3	2	2	2	1*	2	1	13	**3**	**11**	**2**	**13***	17	**1***	2	12	370
4	(United States) G3 Argyros	5	10	6	18	3	3	4	5	3	5	8	4	9	4	3	15	6	13	289
5	(United States) Caleb Gafrarar	**18**	3	16	4	7	5	15	4	17	4	1*	2	5	15	2	4	10	6	288
6	(United States) Evan Cooley	4	6	9	3	5	11	19	10	7	2	11	6	10	18	15	10	16	4	234
7	(Canada) Anthony Martella	6	15	19	7	11	14	16	1*	13	6	7	12	17	6	16	8	5	7	220
8	(Colombia) Sebastián Garzón	11	4	14	6	8	7	17	8	20	9	12	13	7	17	13	5	4	3	217
9	(Brazil) Lucas Fecury	7	18	8	11	15	17	14	16	5	8	5	5	4	7	6	16	13	8	203
10	(Australia) Eddie Beswick	10	19	11	14	17	9	8	14	9	10	10	7	13	2	18	6	7	9	195
11	(United States) Christian Cameron	8	14	7	12	9	19	18	12	4	11	6	15	8	14	DNS	7	9	10	181
12	(Australia) Brad Majman	19	5	4	16	13	18	6	3			Wth	Wth	Wth	5	5	9	15	5	171
13	(United States) Jeshua Alianell	3	9	10	13	14	20	13	17	12	12	9	14	6	16	7	14	14	11	170
14	(United Kingdom) Liam McNeilly	1*	**1***	**1***	**1***	**1***	Wth	Wth												163
15	(France) Timothy Carel	15	11	12	9	12	12	20	19	8	15	16	8	11	8	9	17	DNS	DNS	135
16	(United States) Ayrton Houk	9	13	15	10	10	8	7	**11**	6	20	13	17	12						128
17	(South Africa) Wian Boshoff	17	17	17	15	18	15	10	13	10	16	15	10	15	10	12				109
18	(United States) Ryan Giannetta	16	16	18	19	16	16	12		14	18	17	16	16	DNS	11	11	8	14	98
19	(Mexico) Rodrigo González						10	11	15	19	17				9	8				61
20	(Mexico) Patricio González						13	9	18	11	21				12	10				56
21	(United States) Vaughn Mishko											14	9	14			12	11	16	50
22	(United States) Simon Sikes						6	5												32
23	(United States) Brady Golan	13	12	13	17	19														31
24	(United Kingdom) Harley Keeble									18	3									25
25	(United States) Kaylee Countryman									15	19				11	14				25
26	(United States) Spencer Hancock																13	12	15	23
27	(United States) Elliot Cox								7											21
28	(United States) Thomas Nordquist									16	14									12
29	(United States) Brenden Cooley									21	DNS									1
—	(United States) JT Hoskins									DNS	DNS									0
Pos.	Driver	STP		NOLA			IMS		IRP	ROA		MOH			TOR		POR			Points

Color	Result
Gold	Winner
Silver	2nd place
Bronze	3rd place
Green	4th & 5th place
Light Blue	6th–10th place
Dark Blue	Finished (Outside Top 10)
Purple	Did not finish
Red	Did not qualify (DNQ)
Brown	Withdrawn (Wth)
Black	Disqualified (DSQ)
White	Did not start (DNS)
Blank	Did not participate

**In-line notation**
**Bold**	Pole position (1 point)
Italics	Ran fastest race lap (1 point)
*	Led most race laps (1 point); Not awarded if more than one driver led most laps
Rookie

=== Teams' championship ===
Scoring system

Position	**1st**	**2nd**	**3rd**	**4th**	**5th**	**6th**	**7th**	**8th**	**9th**	**10th+**
Points	22	18	15	12	10	8	6	4	2	1

- Single car teams received 3 bonus points as an equivalency to multi-car teams.
- Only the best two results counted for teams fielding more than two entries.

Pos.	Team	STP		NOLA			IMS		IRP	ROA		MOH			TOR		POR			Points
1	VRD Racing	7	7	3	2	2	2	1	2	1	1	3	3	2	3	4	1	2	1	448
1	VRD Racing	11	8	5	8	6	4	2	6	2	10	4	10	3	11	10	3	3	9	448
2	Exclusive Autosport	2	2	2	3	4	1	3	9	4	2	2	1	1	1	1	2	1	2	438
2	Exclusive Autosport	4	6	7	5	5	11	12	10	6	7	5	5	4	7	6	9	11	4	438
3	Pabst Racing	5	3	6	4	3	3	4	4	3	4	1	2	5	4	2	4	6	6	320
3	Pabst Racing	13	10	12	13	7	5	13	5	13	5	7	4	8	12	3	12	8	11	320
4	Jay Howard Driver Development	1	1	1	1	1	12	6	1	7	3	6	7	9	5	5	7	5	5	311
4	Jay Howard Driver Development	6	5	4	7	10	13	14	3	12	6	12	11	13	6	9	8	12	7	311
5	DEForce Racing	3	4	8	6	8	7	9	8	10	8	8	8	6	8	7	5	4	3	151
5	DEForce Racing	10	9	10	10	11	10	11	14	11	11	10	12	7	10	8	10	9	10	151
6	Synergy Motorsport	9	13	9	11	12	9	8	13	8	9	9	6	11	2	12	6	7	8	122
7	Sarah Fisher Hartman Racing	12	12	13	12	13	6	5	7	9	12	13	9	12	9	11				78
7	Sarah Fisher Hartman Racing						14	10	12											78
8	Benchmark Autosport	8	11	11	9	9	8	7	11	5	13	11	13	10						74
9	ENVE Motorsports																11	10	12	12
Pos.	Team	STP		NOLA			IMS		IRP	ROA		MOH			TOR		POR			Points

== See also ==
- 2025 IndyCar Series
- 2025 Indy NXT
- 2025 USF Pro 2000 Championship
- 2025 USF Juniors
