= Grand Prix of Portland =

IndyCar Series race held in Portland, Oregon, United States

Coordinates: 45°35′49″N 122°41′45″W

IndyCar Series
- Venue: Portland International Raceway
- Corporate sponsor: OnlyBulls
- First race: 1984
- First ICS race: 2018
- Distance: 216.04 mi (347.683 km)
- Laps: 110
- Previous names: Stroh's/G.I. Joe's 200 (1984–1985); Budweiser/G.I. Joe's 200 (1986–1990, 1996); Texaco/Havoline Presents the Budweiser/G.I. Joe's 200 (1991–1995, 1998–1999); Budweiser/G.I. Joe's 200 Presented by Texaco/Havoline (1997); Freightliner/G.I. Joe's 200 Presented by Texaco (2000–2001); G.I. Joe's 200 (2002–2003); Champ Car Grand Prix of Portland (2004); G.I. Joe's Grand Prix of Portland (2005–2006); Mazda Grand Prix of Portland (2007); Grand Prix of Portland (2018–2019, 2021–2022); BitNile.com Grand Prix of Portland (2023–2024); BitNile.com Grand Prix of Portland presented by askROI (2025)
- Most wins (driver): Michael Andretti; Al Unser Jr. Will Power; Álex Palou (3)
- Most wins (team): Team Penske (9)
- Most wins (manufacturer): Chassis: Lola (12); Engine: Chevrolet (9)

The Grand Prix of Portland (currently is known as the OnlyBulls Grand Prix of Portland for sponsorship reasons) is a race that is in the IndyCar Series held at the Portland International Raceway in Portland, Oregon. The race was an annual event from 1984 to 2007, initially as a race in the CART series, and later it was part of the Champ Car World Series. Then after a ten-year hiatus, the race made its return with being added to the IndyCar Series in the 2018 season.

== History ==
Championship car racing first appeared in the Portland area in June 1909, at the 14.6-mile Portland Road Race Course. Two 3-lap races were held, followed by a 7-lap main event titled the Wemme Cup, which was won by Bert Dingley.

Portland is best-remembered as being the site of two of the closest finishes on a road course in Indy car racing history. In 1986, Michael Andretti lost fuel pressure on the final turn of the final lap, in which it allowed his father Mario to catch up and beat him to the finish line by 0.070 seconds. At the time, it was the closest finish of any race in Indy Car history. In 1997, in a rare three-wide finish, Mark Blundell beat second place Gil de Ferran by 0.027 seconds, and beat third place Raul Boesel by 0.055 seconds. For a road course race, it was the all-time closest finish in CART series history, as well as the closest three-car finish in series history.

For nearly its entire existence, the title sponsor of the race was sporting goods retailer G.I. Joe's and took place in June, during or around the Portland Rose Festival. Numerous times, the race was held on Father's Day. After a ten-year hiatus, the race made its return to the IndyCar Series in the 2018 season. From 2018 to 2023, the race was held in September on or around Labor Day weekend. In 2024, the race was moved to August to accommodate the new IndyCar schedule. Since returning to the calendar, the race has been promoted by Green Savoree Racing Promotions. In 2025, August would remain the month of the event along with the NASCAR event later that month.

== Race winners ==
Season	Date	Driver	Team	Chassis	Engine	Race Distance		Race Time	Average Speed (mph)	Report
Season	Date	Driver	Team	Chassis	Engine	Laps	Miles (km)	Race Time	Average Speed (mph)	Report
CART/Champ Car World Series
1.915 miles (3.082 km) course
1984	June 17	(United States) Al Unser Jr.	Galles Racing	March 84C	Cosworth	104	199.16 (320.516)	1:53:17	105.484	Report
1985	June 16	(United States) Mario Andretti	Newman/Haas Racing	Lola T900	Cosworth	104	199.16 (320.516)	1:51:35	107.083	Report
1986	June 15	(United States) Mario Andretti (2)	Newman/Haas Racing (2)	Lola T86/00	Cosworth	104	199.16 (320.516)	1:50:53	107.759	Report
1987	June 14	(United States) Bobby Rahal	Truesports	Lola T87/00	Cosworth	104	199.16 (320.516)	1:50:02	108.59	Report
1.922 miles (3.093 km) course
1988	June 19	(United States) Danny Sullivan	Penske Racing	Penske PC-17	Chevrolet-Ilmor	104	199.888 (321.688)	1:57:17	102.253	Report
1989	June 25	(Brazil) Emerson Fittipaldi	Patrick Racing	Penske PC-18	Chevrolet-Ilmor	104	199.888 (321.688)	1:55:20	103.984	Report
1990	June 24	(United States) Michael Andretti	Newman/Haas Racing (3)	Lola T90/00	Chevrolet-Ilmor	104	199.888 (321.688)	1:48:22	110.643	Report
1991	June 23	(United States) Michael Andretti (2)	Newman/Haas Racing (4)	Lola T91/00	Chevrolet-Ilmor	104	199.888 (321.688)	1:44:06	115.208	Report
1.95 miles (3.14 km) course
1992	June 21	(United States) Michael Andretti (3)	Newman/Haas Racing (5)	Lola T92/00	Ford-Cosworth XB	102	198.9 (320.098)	1:53:25	105.219	Report
1993	June 27	(Brazil) Emerson Fittipaldi (2)	Penske Racing (2)	Penske PC-22	Chevrolet-Ilmor C	102	198.9 (320.098)	2:03:54	96.312	Report
1994	June 26	(United States) Al Unser Jr. (2)	Penske Racing (3)	Penske PC-23	Ilmor D	102	198.9 (320.098)	1:50:43	107.777	Report
1995	June 25	(United States) Al Unser Jr. (3)	Penske Racing (4)	Penske PC-24	Mercedes-Benz-Ilmor	102	198.9 (320.098)	1:54:49	103.933	Report
1996	June 23	(Italy) Alex Zanardi	Chip Ganassi Racing	Reynard 96I	Honda	98	191.1 (307.545)	1:50:25	103.837	Report
1.967 miles (3.166 km) course
1997	June 22	(United Kingdom) Mark Blundell	PacWest Racing	Reynard 97I	Mercedes-Benz-Ilmor	78*	153.426 (246.915)	2:00:12	76.575	Report
1998	June 21	(Italy) Alex Zanardi (2)	Chip Ganassi Racing (2)	Reynard 98I	Honda	98	192.766 (310.226)	1:54:06	101.355	Report
1.969 miles (3.169 km) course
1999	June 20	(Brazil) Gil de Ferran	Walker Racing	Reynard 99I	Honda	98	192.962 (310.542)	1:47:44	107.457	Report
2000	June 25	(Brazil) Gil de Ferran (2)	Penske Racing (5)	Reynard 2KI	Honda HRK	112	220.528 (354.905)	2:00:46	109.564	Report
2001	June 24	(Italy) Max Papis	Team Rahal	Lola B01/00	Ford-Cosworth	76*	149.644 (240.828)	2:00:20	74.606	Report
2002	June 16	(Brazil) Cristiano da Matta	Newman/Haas Racing (6)	Lola B02/00	Toyota	110	216.59 (348.567)	2:03:19	105.381	Report
2003	June 22	(Mexico) Adrián Fernández	Fernández Racing	Lola B02/00	Ford-Cosworth XFE	100	196.9 (316.879)	1:56:16	101.602	Report
2004	June 20	(France) Sébastien Bourdais	Newman/Haas Racing (7)	Lola B02/00	Ford-Cosworth XFE	94	185.086 (297.867)	1:45:50	104.923	Report
1.964 miles (3.161 km) course
2005	June 19	(Brazil) Cristiano da Matta (2)	PKV Racing	Lola B02/00	Ford-Cosworth XFE	105	206.22 (331.878)	1:51:51	110.616	Report
2006	June 18	(United States) A. J. Allmendinger	Forsythe Racing	Lola B03/00	Ford-Cosworth XFE	105	206.22 (331.878)	1:48:32	113.989	Report
2007	June 10	(France) Sébastien Bourdais (2)	Newman/Haas Racing (8)	Panoz DP01	Cosworth XFE	103	202.292 (325.557)	1:45:42	114.816	Report
2008 – 2017	Not held									
IndyCar Series
1.967 miles (3.166 km) course
2018	Sept. 2	(Japan) Takuma Sato	Rahal Letterman Lanigan Racing (2)	Dallara DW12 IR-18	Honda	105	206.535 (332.386)	2:00:09	102.971	Report
2019	Sept. 1	(Australia) Will Power	Team Penske (6)	Dallara DW12 IR-18	Chevrolet	105	206.535 (332.386)	1:58:43	104.225	Report
2020	Canceled due to the COVID-19 pandemic.									
2021	Sept. 12	(Spain) Álex Palou	Chip Ganassi Racing (3)	Dallara DW12 IR-18	Honda	110	216.37 (348.214)	2:07:04	102.011	Report
2022	Sept. 4	(New Zealand) Scott McLaughlin	Team Penske (7)	Dallara DW12 IR-18	Chevrolet	110	216.37 (348.214)	1:56:15	111.493	Report
2023	Sept. 3	(Spain) Álex Palou (2)	Chip Ganassi Racing (4)	Dallara DW12 IR-18	Honda	110	216.37 (348.214)	1:57:01	110.758	Report
2024	Aug. 25	(Australia) Will Power (2)	Team Penske (8)	Dallara DW12 IR-18	Chevrolet	110	216.37 (348.214)	1:55:34	112.161	Report
2025	Aug. 10	(Australia) Will Power (3)	Team Penske (9)	Dallara DW12 IR-18	Chevrolet	110	216.37 (348.214)	2:01:06	107.038	Report
2026	Aug. 9	(Spain) Álex Palou (3)	Chip Ganassi Racing (5)	Dallara DW12 IR-18	Honda	110	216.37 (348.214)	1:55:03	112.661	Report

Notes

- 1997 & 2001: Race shortened due to time limit.

=== Support race winners ===
Indy NXT (formerly Indy Lights)
Season	Date	Winning driver	Chassis	Engine	Team
American Racing Series
1988	June 19	(Republic of Ireland) Tommy Byrne	March	Buick	Opar Racing; R & K Racing
1989	June 25	(Republic of Ireland) Tommy Byrne	March	Buick	Landford Racing
1990	June 24	(Canada) Paul Tracy	March	Buick	Landford Racing
Indy Lights
1991	June 23	(Belgium) Éric Bachelart	March	Buick	Landford Racing
1992	June 21	(France) Franck Fréon	March	Buick	Landford Racing
1993	June 27	(France) Franck Fréon	Lola	Buick	John Martin Racing
1994	June 26	(Brazil) André Ribeiro	Lola	Buick	Tasman Motorsports
1995	June 25	(Canada) Greg Moore	Lola	Buick	Forsythe Racing
1996	June 23	(Brazil) Gualter Salles	Lola	Buick	Brian Stewart Racing
1997	June 22	(Japan) Hideki Noda	Lola	Buick	Indy Regency Racing
1998	June 21	(United Kingdom) Guy Smith	Lola	Buick	Johansson Motorsports
1999	June 20	(Austria) Philipp Peter	Lola	Buick	Dorricott Racing
2000	June 25	(Australia) Jason Bright	Lola	Buick	Dorricott Racing
2001	June 24	(Republic of Ireland) Damien Faulkner	Lola	Buick	Dorricott Racing
2002 – 2017	Not Held				
2018	September 1	(Mexico) Patricio O'Ward	Dallara	Mazda	Andretti Autosport
2018	September 2	(Mexico) Patricio O'Ward	Dallara	Mazda	Andretti Autosport
2019	August 31	(Netherlands) Rinus VeeKay	Dallara	AER	Juncos Racing
2019	September 1	(United Kingdom) Toby Sowery	Dallara	AER	HMD Motorsports; Team Pelfrey
2020	canceled due to the COVID-19 pandemic.				
2021	September 11	(United States) David Malukas	Dallara	AER	HMD Motorsports
2021	September 12	(United States) Kyle Kirkwood	Dallara	AER	Andretti Autosport
2022	September 4	(Denmark) Benjamin Pedersen	Dallara	AER	Global Racing Group with HMD Motorsports
Indy NXT
2023	September 3	(United Kingdom) Louis Foster	Dallara	AER	Andretti Autosport
2024	August 25	(United States) Jacob Abel	Dallara	AER	Abel Motorsports
2025	August 10	(Norway) Dennis Hauger	Dallara	AER	Andretti Global
2026	August 9	(Argentina) Alessandro de Tullio	Dallara	AER	A. J. Foyt Racing

USF Pro 2000 Championship (formerly Pro Mazda/Indy Pro 2000)
Season	Date	Winning driver
2018	September 1	(United States) Oliver Askew
2018	September 2	(United States) David Malukas
2019	August 31	(United States) Kyle Kirkwood
2019	September 1	(United States) Kyle Kirkwood
2020	canceled due to the COVID-19 pandemic.	
2021	Not held.	
2022	September 2	(United Kingdom) Louis Foster
2022	September 2	(United States) Reece Gold
2022	September 3	(United States) Reece Gold
2023	September 1	(Brazil) Kiko Porto
2023	September 2	(United States) Michael d'Orlando
2023	September 3	(United States) Nikita Johnson
2024	August 23	(United States) Nikita Johnson
2024	August 24	(United States) Nikita Johnson
2025	August 9	(United States) Max Garcia
2025	August 10	(United States) Max Garcia
2026	August 7	(United States) G3 Argyros
2026	August 8	(Brazil) Leonardo Escorpioni

USF2000 Championship
Season	Date	Winning driver
2018	September 1	(United States) Kyle Kirkwood
2018	September 2	(United States) Kyle Kirkwood
2019	August 31	(New Zealand) Hunter McElrea
2019	September 1	(New Zealand) Hunter McElrea
2020	canceled due to the COVID-19 pandemic.	
2021	Not held.	
2022	September 2	(United States) Jace Denmark
2022	September 2	(Canada) Mac Clark
2022	September 3	(United States) Michael d'Orlando
2023	September 2	(New Zealand) Jacob Douglas
2023	September 2	(New Zealand) Jacob Douglas
2023	September 3	(United States) Simon Sikes
2024	August 23	(United States) Michael Costello
2024	August 24	(United States) Max Garcia
2024	August 24	(United States) G3 Argyros
2025	August 9	(United States) Thomas Schrage
2025	August 9	(United States) Jack Jeffers
2025	August 10	(United States) Teddy Musella
2026	August 7	(United States) Oliver Wheldon
2026	August 8	(United States) Oliver Wheldon

USF Juniors
Season	Date	Winning driver
2024	August 23	(United Kingdom) Liam McNeilly
2024	August 23	(United Kingdom) Liam McNeilly
2024	August 24	(United Kingdom) Liam McNeilly
2025	August 9	(Brazil) Leonardo Escorpioni
2025	August 9	(Brazil) Leonardo Escorpioni
2025	August 10	(Canada) Ty Fisher

Atlantic Championship
Season	Date	Winning driver
1984	June 10	(United States) Dan Marvin
1985	September 8	(United States) Jeff Wood
1986	August 24	(United States) Ted Prappas
1987	June 13	(United States) Dean Hall
1987	September 13	(United States) R. K. Smith
1988	August 28	(United States) Mitch Thieman
2002	June 16	(Mexico) Luis Díaz
2003	June 22	(United Kingdom) Ryan Dalziel
2004	June 19	(United States) Jon Fogarty
2004	June 20	(United States) Jon Fogarty
2005	June 18	(Estonia) Tõnis Kasemets
2005	June 19	(Estonia) Tõnis Kasemets
2006	June 18	(Canada) James Hinchcliffe
2007	June 9	(Canada) Robert Wickens
2007	June 10	(Canada) Kevin Lacroix

Stadium Super Trucks
Season	Date	Winning driver
2019	August 30	(United States) Sheldon Creed
2019	September 1	(Australia) Matthew Brabham
2020	canceled due to the COVID-19 pandemic.	

== Race summaries ==
=== CART PPG Indy Car World Series ===
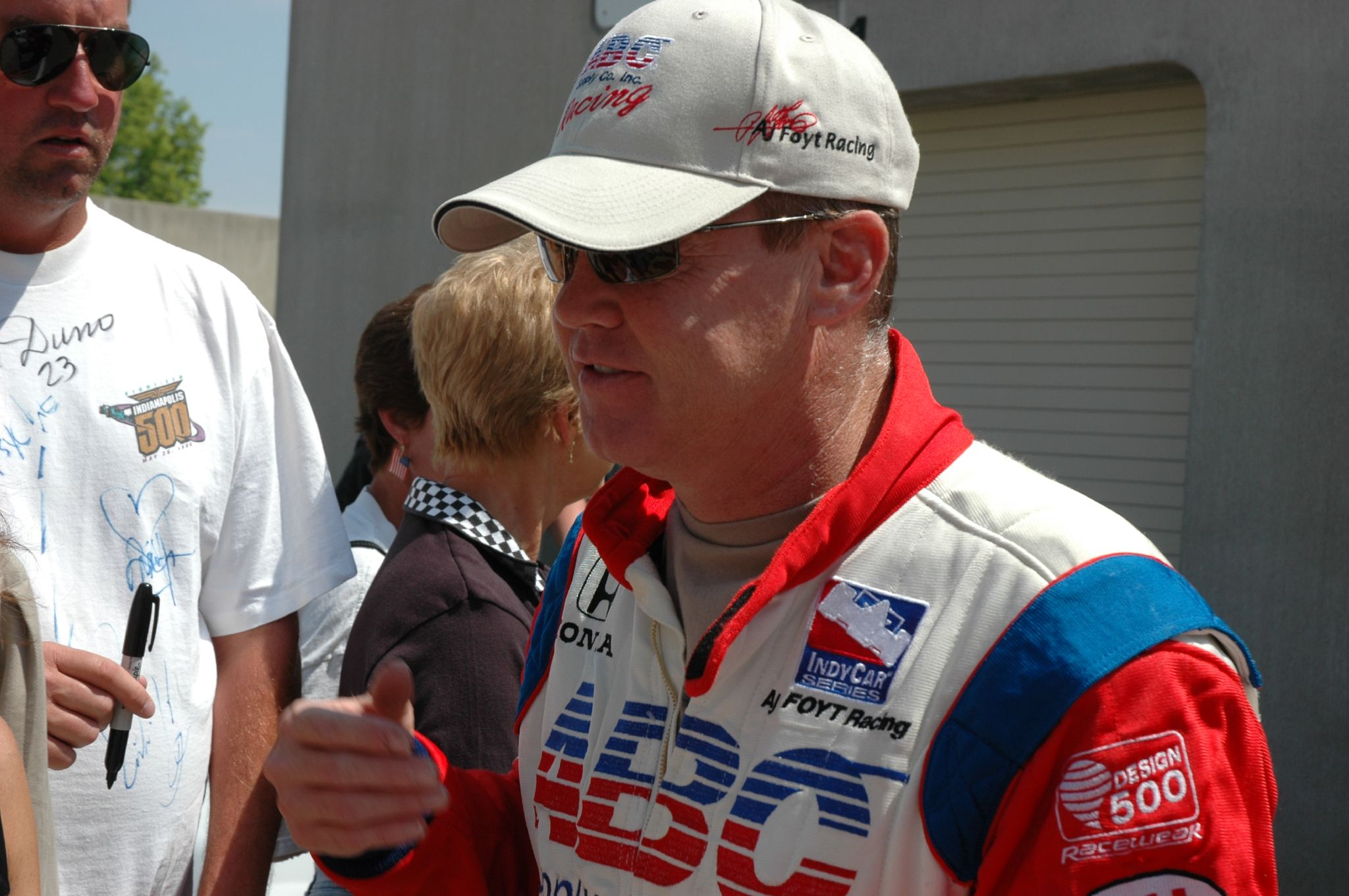
Al Unser Jr. won his first career Indy car race at Portland in 1984. Unser would go on to win three times at Portland.

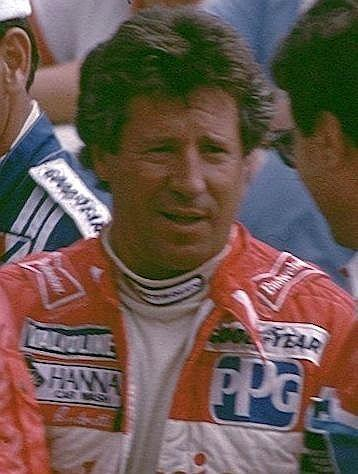
Mario Andretti won the 1986 race at Portland, the closest finish in Indy car history on a road course at the time.

- 1984: The CART series debuted at Portland International Raceway in 1984. It was also the first race which CART utilized radial tires. Mario Andretti and Danny Sullivan swept the front row in Lola T-800 machines, the only two Lola chassis in the field. Andretti, however, dropped out early with engine problems, and Sullivan suffered gear box trouble. Al Unser Jr. took the lead for the final time on lap 39, and led all the way to the finish for his first-career Indy car victory. Geoff Brabham finished second.
- 1985: Mario Andretti passed Al Unser Jr. for the lead with 19 laps to go, and pulled out to a 25-second victory. Unser Jr. led 49 laps, but after his final pit stop, a bad set of tires and fuel concerns forced him to slow his pace. Andretti was trailing by nearly 15 seconds, but a fast final pit stop, and handling adjustments allowed him to quickly close the gap and drive to victory. It was his second win in a row, and his third victory of the 1985 season. Indy 500 winner Danny Sullivan started on the pole position, but dropped out on lap 6 due to steering failure.
- 1986: In one of the most dramatic finishes in CART history, Mario Andretti beat his son Michael Andretti to the finish line by 0.07 seconds. It was the closest finish in Indy car racing history at the time. With ten laps to go, Michael led Mario by over eight seconds, and looked to be on his way to a dominating victory. Al Unser Jr. was in third position right on the back bumper of Mario. In the closing laps, however, Michael began experiencing fuel pickup problems. Mario and Unser Jr. were charging, and began trimming the lead. At the white flag, Michael still led by three seconds, but his engine was sputtering. As the cars came off the final corner, Michael's engine quit and he began to coast down the inside of the frontstretch. Mario and Unser Jr. raced to the finish line, and Mario nipped Michael at the line by about two feet. Unser came home a close third. In victory lane, a dejected Michael Andretti declared the win a Father's Day gift for Mario.
- 1987: Roberto Guerrero started on the pole position, but Emerson Fittipaldi got the jump at the start and took the lead on the first lap. Fittipaldi led 45 of the first 46 laps until a blown engine ended his day. Guerrero also dropped out early with engine failure. Bobby Rahal took the lead, and led 56 of the final 58 laps to score his first victory of the 1987 season. Rahal built up a lead of over 23 seconds, and lapped all but second place Michael Andretti. Rahal backed off the pace in the closing laps to conserve fuel, and held off Andretti by 6.39 seconds.
- 1988: Danny Sullivan started the race on the pole position, and led the first 13 laps. But as Sullivan was making his way through traffic on lap 14, he nearly clipped wheels with Rocky Moran and did a half spin to the infield grass. Arie Luyendyk slipped by to take the lead, and Al Unser Jr. took over second. Sullivan dropped to third, but the car was undamaged. Luyendyk led 53 laps and appeared poised to win his first Indy car race. With Luyendyk, Unser, and Sullivan running 1st-2nd-3rd, the leaders prepared for their final pit stop. Luyendyk pitted on lap 69, and Unser pitted on lap 70. Unser's pit stop lasted 32 seconds due to a problem with the left rear wheel, and he dropped out of contention. Sullivan pitted on lap 71. The Penske Team's lightning-fast pit stop put Sullivan out ahead of Luyendyk, and Sullivan drove to victory. Luyendyk finished second, his best career finish at the time, but his pace was slowed at the end after he lost third gear.
- 1989: Teo Fabi scored the first pole position for the Porsche Indy Car team, and led 17 laps, en route to a fourth-place finish. Emerson Fittipaldi won the race, crossing the finish line just seconds before his car ran out of fuel. Bobby Rahal finished second, and gave Fittipaldi a ride back to the pits on his sidepod. Minor mishaps made for a wild afternoon, including the asphalt pavement breaking up in the chicane, and a water main break that threatened to flood some of the pit stalls. Scott Pruett tangled with Al Unser Jr. in the chicane on lap 65, sending Unser into the tire barrier with a broken rear wing. Later, Pruett spun out on his own, right in front of Unser, prompting Unser to clap in celebration. Geoff Brabham was driving in substitute for Danny Sullivan who was still recovering from a broken arm at Indianapolis. Brabham was running second with 14 laps to go when radiator problems put him out.

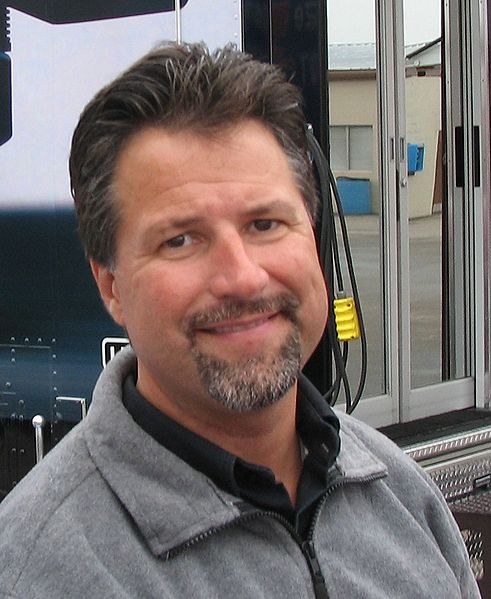
Michael Andretti won at Portland three consecutive years (1990, 1991, 1992).

- 1990: Michael and Mario Andretti, now teammates at Newman Haas Racing, finished 1st-2nd for the second time in an Indy car race. It was the second time it occurred at Portland (after 1986), though this time Michael finished on top. Michael Andretti took the lead at the start, and led 101 of 104 laps.
- 1991: Michael Andretti made a daring pass at the start of the race, and grabbed the lead from the fourth starting position. Andretti would go on to lead all but two laps, and won at Portland for the second consecutive year. As the field came down the frontstretch to take the green flag, Michael Andretti darted to the middle to pass Scott Pruett, then the field fanned out five-wide. Andretti narrowly squeezed between Rick Mears and pole-sitter Emerson Fittipaldi and emerged with the lead in the chicane. Emerson Fittipaldi finished second. Andretti's only tense moment of the day came around the halfway point. He became mired behind the lapped car of Truesports driver Scott Pruett, which allowed Fittipaldi to close within a few seconds. Pruett, who qualified third and finished eight, had a decent run in the Truesports 91C chassis, holding off Andretti for many laps, but was noticeably down on power with the Judd AV engine.
- 1992: For the third year in a row, Michael Andretti won in dominating fashion. Andretti took the lead at the start and led 100 of 102 laps. It was Andretti's first win of the 1992 season, and the first Indy car victory for the new Ford Cosworth XB engine. The 1992 race saw changes to the race track. The chicane near the end of the mainstretch was removed, and replaced by the sharper and longer Festival Curves.
- 1993: Nigel Mansell started from the pole, and led the first 27 laps. In fierce battle with Emerson Fittipaldi, Mansell locked up the brakes on lap 28 going into the Festival Curves, and slid off-course into a row of cones and into the runoff area. Mansell kept the engine running, and re-joined the race, but Fittipaldi was now the leader. The skies opened up on lap 45, soaking the course, and forced the teams to switch to rain tires for the next 25-30 laps. Fittipaldi led 70 of the final 75 laps, and won for the second time at Portland. Mansell charged back to finish in second place.
- 1994: Team Penske swept the podium with Al Unser Jr. winning, Emerson Fittipaldi second, and Paul Tracy third. Unser grabbed the lead at the start and led 96 laps en route to victory. Unser made his final pit stop on lap 69. Fittipaldi made his stop one lap later, and for a moment appeared that he would emerge as the leader. Unser on warmer tires, passed Fittipaldi coming out of the Festival Curves, and led the rest of the way.
- 1995: Al Unser Jr. dominated the race, leading 76 of the 102 laps, and beat second place Jimmy Vasser by over 28 seconds. However, Unser's car failed post-race inspection due to insufficient ground clearance. Unser was stripped of the victory, and Jimmy Vasser was elevated to the winner, tentatively his first-career Indy car triumph. Throughout the race, Unser's machine was observed bottoming out, and on lap 90, a portion of the plywood skidpad flew off the bottom of the car. Vasser was informed of the decision three hours after the race. Team Penske protested the ruling, claiming that the skidpad damage was caused by a bumpy track surface. The appeals process dragged out through the summer, and in August, CART officials formally denied the appeal. The case was then sent to a three-member panel for a second appeal. The panel ruled that the CART technicians used inconsistent methods to measure Unser's car versus the other cars in the field. The panel re-instated the victory, and 21 championship points, to Unser on September 22. Vasser was moved back to second place. The ruling did not change the championship standings, however, as Unser would finish second in the final points standings with or without the victory.
- 1996: Rookie Alex Zanardi won his first CART series race, leading 88 of the 102 laps. About 30 laps into the race, a rain shower swept over the track, but Zanardi elected not to switch to rain tires. His 17-second lead evaporated, and Al Unser Jr. passed Zanardi for the lead on lap 39. The lead was short-lived, as Unser's rain tires began to fall off. Two laps later, Zanardi was back in the lead, and the rain soon stopped. Zanardi pulled away for a 9-second win over Gil de Ferran.

=== CART Fedex Championship Series ===
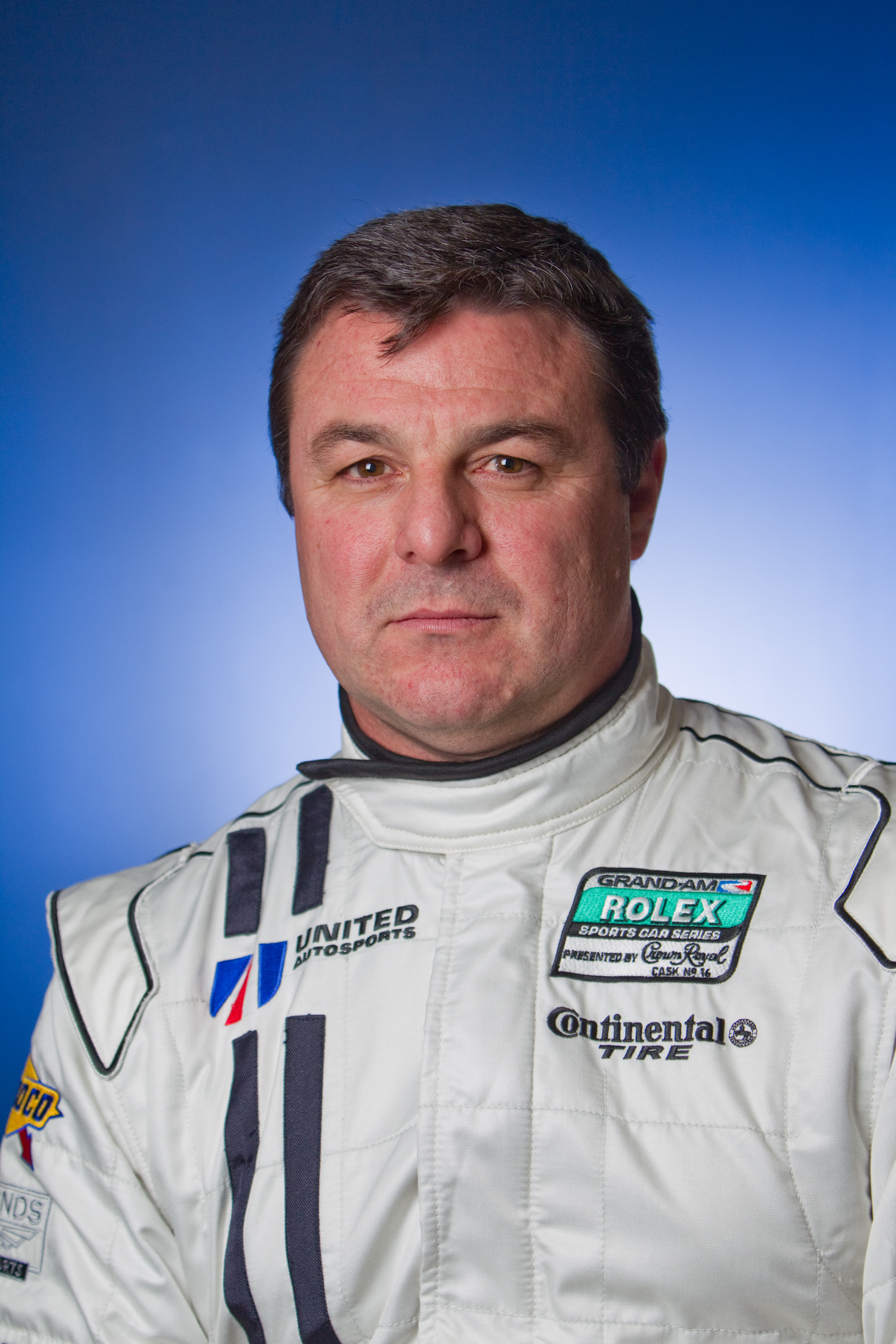
Mark Blundell's dramatic victory in 1997 was the closest 1-2-3 finish in CART series history at the time.

- 1997: The race was the closest finish in the history of the CART series on a road course, as well as the closest three-car finish of any Indy car race at the time. Rain fell most of the day, making for a slick track, resulting in several spins and numerous off-course excursions. Late in the race, Gil de Ferran led with Christian Fittipaldi close behind in second, but the race was approaching the two-hour time limit. With the track slowly starting to dry, some teams elected gamble and change to slick tires. Paul Tracy, Maurício Gugelmin, Alex Zanardi, and others all came out on slicks and proceeded to spin off course. On lap 68 Mark Blundell also switched to slicks, and he too attempted to chase down the leaders. The race was set to end early at the completion of lap 78. With two laps to go, Blundell had caught up to de Ferran and Fittipaldi, but was carefully trying to maneuver around traffic and stay on course. Blundell passed Fittipaldi for second in turn ten. Meanwhile, Raul Boesel was closing in on the leaders as well. The white flag was raised by Gil de Ferran as Mark Blundell pursued him. On the last lap, de Ferran struggled mightily to keep Blundell at bay as they were nose-to-tail and side by side. Boesel slipped by Fittipaldi for third place in turn nine, and quickly closed in behind the two leaders. Coming off the final turn of the final lap, the finish became a three-wide drag race between de Ferran, Blundell, and Boesel. Mark Blundell nosed ahead at the finish line and beat Gil de Ferran by 0.027 seconds. Boesel crossed the finish line third, only 0.055 seconds behind. it was Blundell's first CART series victory, and first professional win since the 1992 24 Hours of Le Mans.
- 1998: At the start, Greg Moore's car veered to the inside, then wildly hopped the curbing going into the Festival Curves. Moore crashed out himself along with Paul Tracy and Christian Fittipaldi. At least four other cars were involved, including Michael Andretti who was hit and stalled in the gravel trap. Polesitter Bryan Herta led the first 13 laps, but his Team Rahal crew decided to pit during a caution on lap 14 and make it a three-stop race. The pit strategy backfired, however, and Herta spent most of the day trying to catch back up to the lead. Alex Zanardi, utilizing a two-stop strategy, was leading the race when Dario Franchitti had a frightening crash on lap 73. Franchitti clipped wheels with P. J. Jones, and slammed into the outside barrier near turn ten. Herta immediately ducked into the pits during the resulting caution, and bunched up behind Zanardi for the subsequent restart. Zanardi got the jump on the restart, while Herta was held up behind the lapped car Richie Hearn. Gil de Ferran pounced on Herta, but the two cars tangled in the Festival Curves. Scott Pruett slipped by to take second, while Zanardi went on to win. Herta recovered to finish third.
- 1999: With most teams employing a two-stop, fuel conservation strategy, Gil de Ferran of Walker Racing decided to scuttle the fuel conservation and drive all-out for the lead. He would need three pit stops, and would have to hope for no full-course caution periods during his final stint. With less than ten laps to go, de Ferran had built up a 29-second lead over second place Juan Pablo Montoya, but needed one final pit stop for fuel. On lap 90, de Ferran came in for a splash-and-go stop for fuel, and remarkably came out on the track still seven seconds ahead of Montoya. Gil de Ferran held on over the final 8 laps and scored his first CART series victory in three years, and the first win for Walker Racing since Robby Gordon at Detroit in 1995.
- 2000: In an effort to take fuel strategy off the table, the race was lengthened from 98 to 112 laps. One driver, however, Roberto Moreno, still attempted to finish the race with only two pit stops. Gil de Ferran, now with Penske Racing, mimicked his strategy from the previous year, and raced all-out, all along planning three pit stops. In the closing laps, the leaders started cycling through a series of splash-and-go pit stops. Gil de Ferran pitted on lap 89, while race leader Hélio Castroneves pitted on lap 105. The lead went to Gil de Ferran, while Moreno stayed out and moved up to second. The victory went to de Ferran, his second consecutive win at Portland. After leading 85 laps, Castroneves ran out of fuel on the final lap and finished a distant 7th place.
- 2001: Steady rain made for a slippery course, resulting in several spins and crashes, and nine caution periods. The race was shortened from 98 to 76 laps due to the two-hour time limit, and Max Papis emerged as the winner. Papis started on the pole position and avoided all the melees, and made only one pit stop en route to victory. Papis held off Roberto Moreno, who finished second at Portland for the second year in a row.
- 2002: Cristiano da Matta started from the pole, but Kenny Bräck grabbed the lead at the start. Brack controversially caused the start to be waved off three times for not being properly in line. Then on the fourth start attempt, a collision deep in the field sent three cars spinning and three to the escape road. Brack led 55 of the first 59 laps. On lap 60, Brack, Cristiano da Matta, and Bruno Junqueira all came in the pits, running 1-2-3. Brack came out first, but while accelerating into the Festival Curves, lost the left rear wheel which was not properly fastened. Cristiano de Matta led the rest of the way, holding of Junquiera by 0.625 seconds for the victory.
- 2003: Adrián Fernández passed Paul Tracy going into the Festival Curves on lap 86, and drove to victory, the first CART series win by an owner/driver since 1992. The pass came one lap after a restart, and Tracy came home second. Tracy started on the pole position and led 42 laps, but he was penalized on lap 44 for a pit exit infraction. In a battle for the lead with Michel Jourdain Jr., Tracy cut off Jourdain in the pit lane, swinging out of his pit box directly to the outside fast lane, which was against the rules. One lap later, Jourdain and Tracy went side by side into the Festival Curves, and locked wheels, sending Jourdain spinning and out of contention.

=== Champ Car World Series ===
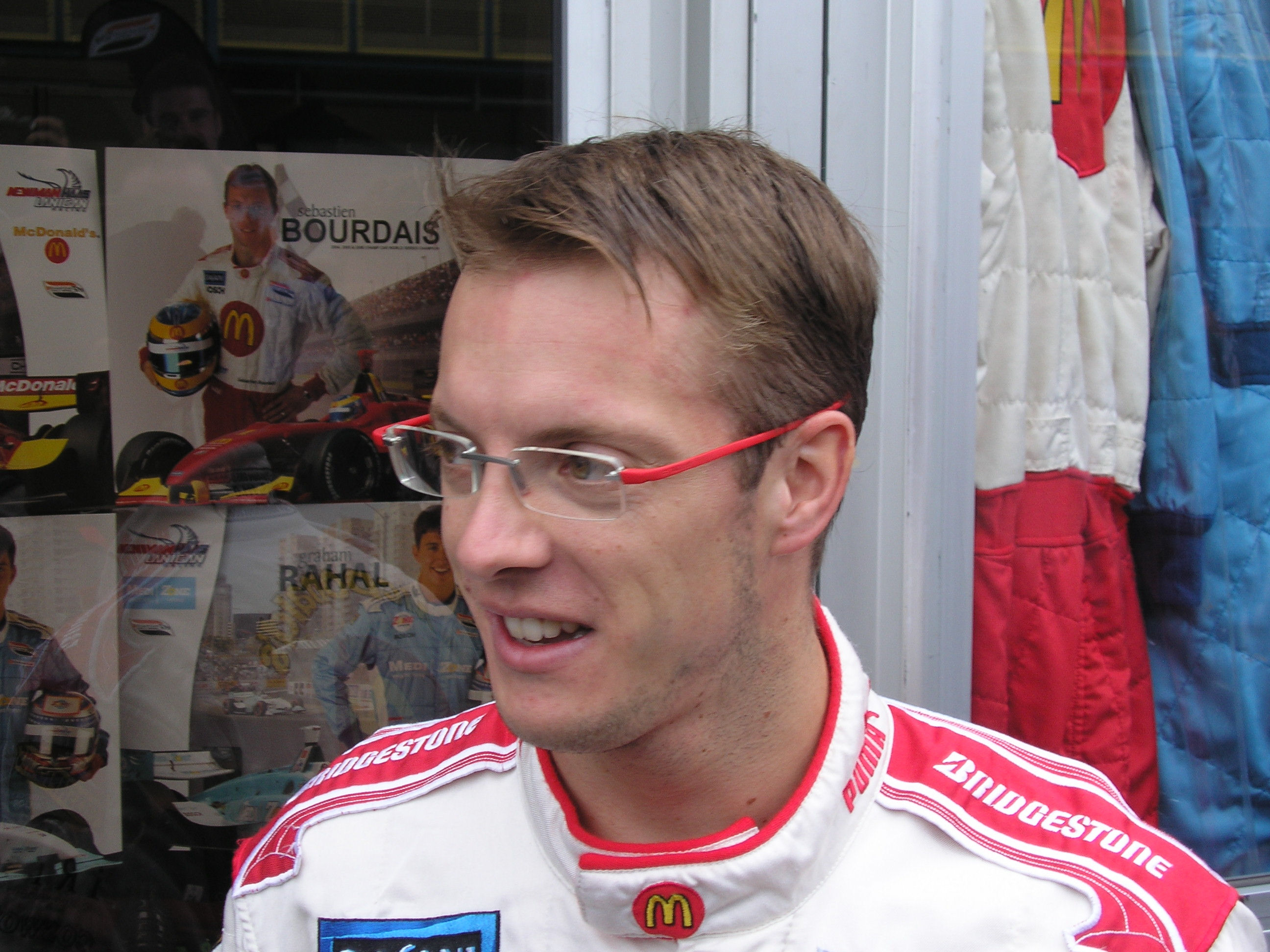
Sébastien Bourdais is a two-time winner at Portland (2004, 2007).

- 2004: Sébastien Bourdais started on the pole position and won the race, his first victory at Portland. Bourdais led 85 of the 94 laps, on a hot, slick day. Bruno Junqueira, who started second, was charging near the end on the alternate "red" tires. Bourdais at one point held an 8.8-second advantage, but Junqueira closed the gap. With two laps to go, Junqueira set the fastest lap of the race, but Bourdais held on at the finish line to win by 1.247 seconds.
- 2005: Justin Wilson started on the pole and led 43 of the first 45 laps. But Wilson dropped out with an oil pump failure on lap 46. Cristiano da Matta drove to victory, his second win at Portland.
- 2006: One week after being fired at RuSPORT, A. J. Allmendinger switched to the Forsythe team, and subsequently drove to victory at Portland, his first win in Champ Car. It was the first of three consecutive wins on the 2006 Champ Car season, and five overall with the team. Allmendinger led 100 of the 105 laps, and beat his former RuSPORT teammate Justin Wilson by 5.420 seconds.
- 2007: The final Champ Car race at Portland was the milestone 100th victory for Newman/Haas Racing. Sébastien Bourdais took the lead on lap 57, and cruised to victory. It was the first and only time the Champ Car race at Portland began with a standing start. The race went without a caution, and Bourdais beat second place Justin Wilson by 13.537 seconds.

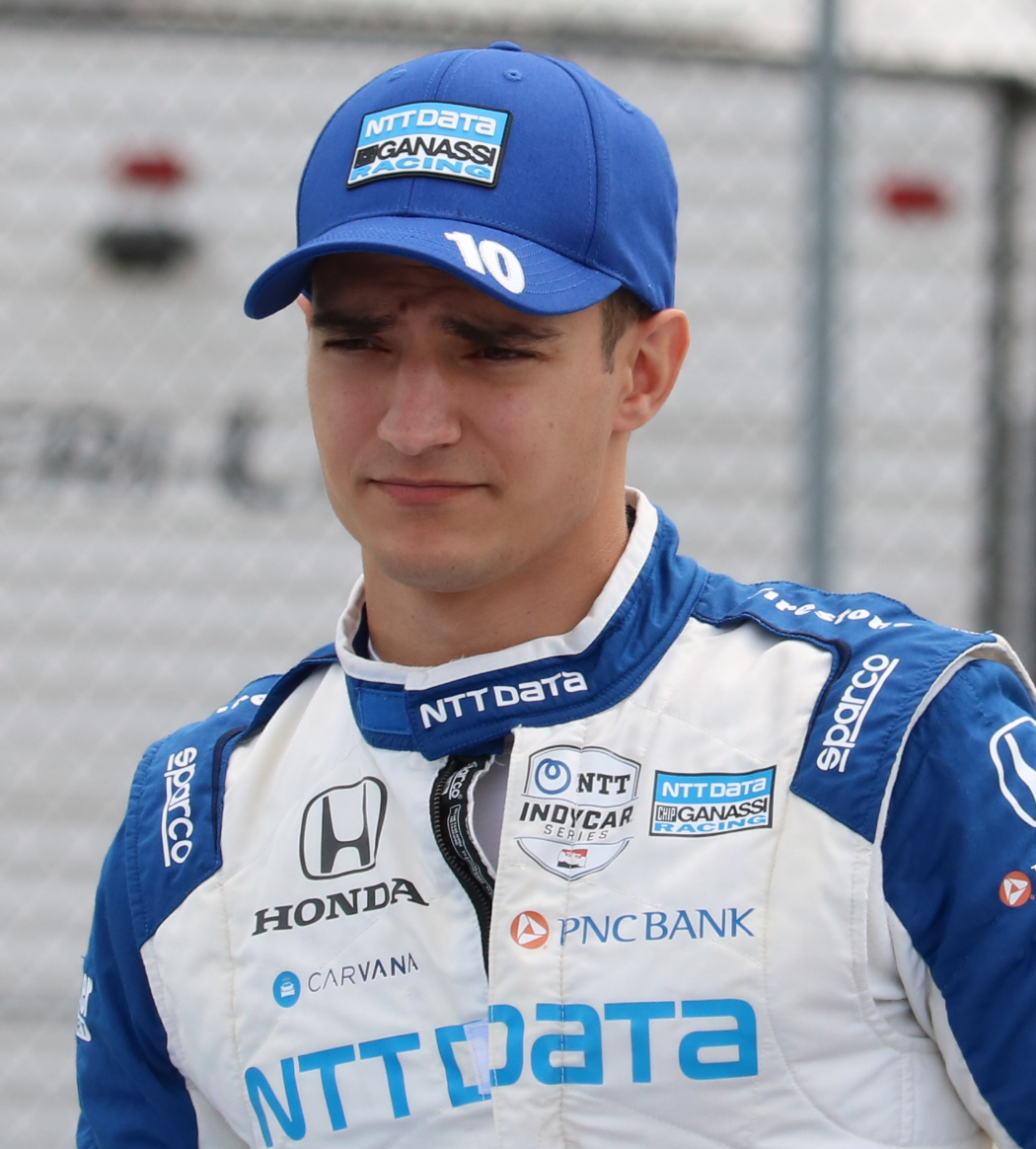
Alex Palou has won twice since IndyCar's return to Portland (2021, 2023).

=== IndyCar Series ===
- 2018: After a ten-year absence, Portland returned to the Indy car calendar. Will Power won the pole for the return race, breaking Justin Wilson's track record from 2005. On the first corner, Zach Veach gave James Hinchcliffe no room and spun him out into traffic including drivers Ed Jones, Graham Rahal, Scott Dixon, and Marco Andretti who went up on the wheels of Hinchcliffe and went over him and Ed Jones and landing on his top. Scott Dixon stopped and hit nothing and continued on, amazingly he finished the race fifth. In the end after Alexander Rossi and Josef Newgarden dominated the race, an untimely caution came out and shuffled the field around. Max Chilton stayed out and led a few laps before pitting late, giving the lead to Takuma Sato, he led the final laps while conserving push to pass seconds and holding off Ryan Hunter-Reay who was charging at the end. It was Sato's first win on a permanent road course and first since his 2017 Indianapolis 500 win.
- 2019: Colton Herta started on pole but the race was won by Will Power with Felix Rosenqvist finishing second and Alexander Rossi third. The first corner of the first lap also ended up taking out both SPM cars, and Zach Veach after Graham Rahal tried a move that was too late going on the inside. Graham was also taken out as well.
- 2020: On July 27, 2020, IndyCar officials were forced to cancel the 2020 edition of the race due to the state of Oregon's ban on gatherings of more than 100 people because of the COVID-19 pandemic.
- 2021: IndyCar returned to Portland in 2021 under the leadership of Roger Penske. Alex Palou took his first pole position of the season and despite getting cycled back after an early first turn pile up managed to win the race to retake the championship points lead. Alexander Rossi earned his first podium of the season with a second-place finish while Scott Dixon would finish third.
- 2022: Scott McLaughlin qualified on pole. To prevent a first lap first corner pileup the drivers agreed to get the green flag further back on the front straight than previous years. This early start was successful in preventing a first lap pileup, and the race went 97 laps without a yellow. McLaughlin led 104 of 110 laps and won the race from pole. Will Power and Scott Dixon rounded out the podium.
- 2023: With a new title sponsor, the 2023 BitNile.com Grand Prix of Portland was the sixteenth round of the IndyCar season. The race was won by Álex Palou who qualified fifth and led for 69 of 110 laps. By virtue of his race win, Palou wrapped up the championship before the final race of the season, a feat last accomplished by Sébastien Bourdais when he won the 2007 Champ Car championship in the penultimate race. Arrow McLaren's Felix Rosenqvist finished second while Palou's Chip Ganassi Racing teammate Scott Dixon came in third. Graham Rahal qualified on the pole and finished twelfth.
- 2024: Portland would be the final road course race for the 2024 IndyCar Series. Santino Ferrucci qualified on pole, earning the first pole position for AJ Foyt Racing in a decade. Will Power took the lead from Ferrucci going into the first corner on the first lap. Alex Palou was the main challenger on Power throughout the day, attempting to run an overcut strategy to no success as Power took his third win of the season. Palou took second place to extend his championship lead, while Josef Newgarden rounded out the podium in third.
- 2025: Ask ROI joined BitNile.com as the sponsor. Will Power won the race and Álex Palou won the championship.
- 2026: OnlyBulls replaced BitNile.com as the sponsor. Álex Palou won his third career race at Portland.

Preceded by Music City Grand Prix	IndyCar Series; BitNile.com Grand Prix of Portland	Succeeded by Ontario Honda Dealers Indy at Markham
