= 2024 Ligier JS F4 Series =

American car race series

The 2024 Ligier JS F4 Series is the inaugural season of the Ligier JS F4 Series. The series was founded from the ashes of the Formula Development series, which served as a feeder into the United States Formula 4 Championship, but suffered chronically low grid numbers. The series is sanctioned by Parella Motorsports Holdings.

The series was created for teams and drivers to utilize the first-generation Ligier JS F4 chassis with Honda engines that lost their homologation after the 2023 season as a development series when the United States Formula 4 Championship switched to the new generation Ligier JS F422 chassis with Ligier Storm engines that complied with newer Formula 4 regulations. It serves as a development series for drivers before advancing to the current generation F4.

== Teams and drivers ==
Team	No.	Driver	Rounds
(United States) Jensen Global Advisors	1	(United States) Cash Felber	3
(United States) Jensen Global Advisors	1	(United States) Athan Sterling	5
(United States) Jensen Global Advisors	1	(United States) Jake Pollack	1–2, 4
(United States) Jensen Global Advisors	7	(United States) Jake Pollack	3
(United States) Jensen Global Advisors	7	(Morocco) Zach Fourie	5
(United States) Jensen Global Advisors	2	(United States) Parker Wallin	1–2
(United States) Jensen Global Advisors	2	(United States) Roman Felber	3
(United States) Jensen Global Advisors	2	(United States) Athan Sterling	4
(United States) Jensen Global Advisors	2	(United States) Ethan Brobston	5
(United States) Crosslink Kiwi Motorsport	5	(United States) Demitri Nolan	All
(United States) Crosslink Kiwi Motorsport	17	(Japan) Takumi Numata	5
(United States) Crosslink Kiwi Motorsport	29	(United States) Kekai Hauanio	All
(United States) Crosslink Kiwi Motorsport	45	(United States) Bacon Zelenka	All
(United States) Crosslink Kiwi Motorsport	95	(Australia) Brad Majman	All
(United States) International Motorsport	6	(Uruguay) Maite Cáceres	All
(United States) LC Racing	8	(United States) Beckham Jacir	5
(United States) LC Racing	12	(Canada) Caleb Campbell	5
(United States) Champagne Racing	10	(Republic of Ireland) Conor Grant	5
(United States) Champagne Racing	26	(Brazil) Leonardo Escorpioni	5
(Canada) Atlantic Racing Team	24	(Australia) Daniel Quimby	1
(United States) Scuderia Buell	25	(United States) Teddy Musella	All
(United States) Scuderia Buell	27	(Poland) Rafał Wołosz	3–4
(United States) Scuderia Buell	27	(Netherlands) Sacha van 't Pad Bosch	5
(United States) Scuderia Buell	44	(Argentina) Pablo Benites Jr.	1
(United States) Szuch Racing	28	(United States) Drew Szuch	All
(United States) Berg DMG Racing	23	(United States) Harbir Dass	4–5
(United States) Berg DMG Racing	49	(United States) Harbir Dass	1–2
(United States) Momentum Motorsports	34	(United States) Parker Wallin	5
(United States) IGY6 Motorsports	72	(United States) Jacob Lawter	1–3
(United States) IGY6 Motorsports	83	(United States) Christopher Parrish	1–2, 4–5
(United States) IGY6 Motorsports	83	(United States) Hayden Bowlsbey	3

== Race calendar ==
The 2024 calendar was announced on 3 October 2023. All rounds will be under the Formula Regional Americas Championship and SVRA support bill, but from Road America onwards, it will also be on the United States Formula 4 support bill, following the cancellation of its round at NOLA Motorsports Park due to shipping delays with the new chassis.

Round		Circuit	Date	Supporting
1	R1	NOLA Motorsports Park, Avondale	13 April	Formula Regional Americas Championship; SVRA Sprint Series; Trans-Am Series; TA2 Series
1	R2	NOLA Motorsports Park, Avondale	13 April	Formula Regional Americas Championship; SVRA Sprint Series; Trans-Am Series; TA2 Series
1	R3	NOLA Motorsports Park, Avondale	14 April	Formula Regional Americas Championship; SVRA Sprint Series; Trans-Am Series; TA2 Series
2	R1	Road America, Elkhart Lake	16–19 May	Formula Regional Americas Championship; United States Formula 4 Championship; SVRA
2	R2	Road America, Elkhart Lake	16–19 May	Formula Regional Americas Championship; United States Formula 4 Championship; SVRA
2	R3	Road America, Elkhart Lake	16–19 May	Formula Regional Americas Championship; United States Formula 4 Championship; SVRA
3	R1	Mid-Ohio Sports Car Course, Lexington	20–23 June	Formula Regional Americas Championship; United States Formula 4 Championship; SVRA
3	R2	Mid-Ohio Sports Car Course, Lexington	20–23 June	Formula Regional Americas Championship; United States Formula 4 Championship; SVRA
3	R3	Mid-Ohio Sports Car Course, Lexington	20–23 June	Formula Regional Americas Championship; United States Formula 4 Championship; SVRA
4	R1	New Jersey Motorsports Park, Millville	25–28 July	Formula Regional Americas Championship; United States Formula 4 Championship; SVRA
4	R2	New Jersey Motorsports Park, Millville	25–28 July	Formula Regional Americas Championship; United States Formula 4 Championship; SVRA
4	R3	New Jersey Motorsports Park, Millville	25–28 July	Formula Regional Americas Championship; United States Formula 4 Championship; SVRA
5	R1	Circuit of the Americas, Austin	31 October–3 November	Formula Regional Americas Championship; United States Formula 4 Championship; SVRA; Trans-Am Series; TA2 Series
5	R2	Circuit of the Americas, Austin	31 October–3 November	Formula Regional Americas Championship; United States Formula 4 Championship; SVRA; Trans-Am Series; TA2 Series
5	R3	Circuit of the Americas, Austin	31 October–3 November	Formula Regional Americas Championship; United States Formula 4 Championship; SVRA; Trans-Am Series; TA2 Series

== Race results ==
Round		Circuit	Pole position	Fastest lap	Winning driver	Winning team
1	R1	NOLA Motorsports Park	(United States) Teddy Musella	(United States) Teddy Musella	(United States) Teddy Musella	(United States) Scuderia Buell
1	R2	NOLA Motorsports Park		(Uruguay) Maite Cáceres	(United States) Kekai Hauanio	(United States) Crosslink Kiwi Motorsport
1	R3	NOLA Motorsports Park		(United States) Teddy Musella	(United States) Teddy Musella	(United States) Scuderia Buell
2	R1	Road America	(United States) Teddy Musella	(United States) Teddy Musella	(United States) Bacon Zelenka	(United States) Crosslink Kiwi Motorsport
2	R2	Road America		(United States) Drew Szuch	(United States) Kekai Hauanio	(United States) Crosslink Kiwi Motorsport
2	R3	Road America		(Uruguay) Maite Cáceres	(United States) Bacon Zelenka	(United States) Crosslink Kiwi Motorsport
3	R1	Mid-Ohio Sports Car Course	(United States) Kekai Hauanio	(United States) Kekai Hauanio	(United States) Teddy Musella	(United States) Scuderia Buell
3	R2	Mid-Ohio Sports Car Course		(United States) Kekai Hauanio	(United States) Kekai Hauanio	(United States) Crosslink Kiwi Motorsport
3	R3	Mid-Ohio Sports Car Course		(United States) Teddy Musella	(United States) Kekai Hauanio	(United States) Crosslink Kiwi Motorsport
4	R1	New Jersey Motorsports Park	(United States) Kekai Hauanio	(United States) Kekai Hauanio	(Australia) Brad Majman	(United States) Crosslink Kiwi Motorsport
4	R2	New Jersey Motorsports Park		(Australia) Brad Majman	(Australia) Brad Majman	(United States) Crosslink Kiwi Motorsport
4	R3	New Jersey Motorsports Park		(Australia) Brad Majman	(Australia) Brad Majman	(United States) Crosslink Kiwi Motorsport
5	R1	Circuit of the Americas	(United States) Teddy Musella	(Netherlands) Sacha van 't Pad Bosch	(United States) Teddy Musella	(United States) Scuderia Buell
5	R2	Circuit of the Americas		(United States) Teddy Musella	(United States) Teddy Musella	(United States) Scuderia Buell
5	R3	Circuit of the Americas		(United States) Kekai Hauanio	(Netherlands) Sacha van 't Pad Bosch	(United States) Scuderia Buell

== Championship standings ==
Points were awarded as follows:

Position	**1st**	**2nd**	**3rd**	**4th**	**5th**	**6th**	**7th**	**8th**	**9th**	**10th**
Points	25	18	15	12	10	8	6	4	2	1

=== Drivers' standings ===
Pos	Driver	NOL			ROA			MOH			NJM			COA			Pts
Pos	Driver	R1	R2	R3	R1	R2	R3	R1	R2	R3 (Note: Half points were awarded in the third race at Mid-Ohio as less than 50% of the scheduled race duration was completed.)	R1	R2	R3	R1	R2	R3	Pts
1	(United States) Teddy Musella	**1**	2	1	**3**	10	5	1	2	2	3	5	3	**1**	1	2	254
2	(United States) Kekai Hauanio	12	1	10	4	1	2	**2**	1	1	**2**	2	2	15	4	Ret	202.5
3	(Uruguay) Maite Cáceres	2	3	5	5	4	3	4	3	13	8	10	Ret	3	5	12	137
4	(United States) Bacon Zelenka	3	4	2	1	8	1	3	4	10	7	9	9	13	EX	EX	136.5
5	(Australia) Brad Majman	5	5	9	2	Ret	9	7	6	8	1	1	1	12	Ret	10	134
6	(United States) Drew Szuch	9	6	4	9	11	4	8	8	5	5	7	4	5	3	7	108
7	(United States) Christopher Parrish	4	8	6	12	2	Ret				9	6	7	6	Ret	6	74
8	(United States) Harbir Dass	Ret	DNS	DNS	6	5	Ret				4	3	6	10	8	3	73
9	(United States) Jake Pollack	8	Ret	7	7	3	6	6	7	3	10	8	Ret				65.5
10	(United States) Demitri Nolan	Ret	WD	WD	8	6	8	Ret	10	12	6	4	5	14	12	8	51
11	(Brazil) Leonardo Escorpioni													2	2	9	38
12	(Netherlands) Sacha van 't Pad Bosch													4	17	1	37
13	(United States) Hayden Bowlsbey							5	5	7							23
14	(United States) Parker Wallin	7	Ret	8	11	7	7							11	10	16	23
15	(United States) Jacob Lawter	10	7	11	10	9	10	9	9	4							21
16	(Canada) Caleb Campbell													7	7	5	22
17	(Japan) Takumi Numata													8	9	4	18
18	(Australia) Daniel Quimby	11	Ret	3													15
19	(Republic of Ireland) Conor Grant													9	6	14	10
20	(Argentina) Pablo Benites Jr.	6	9	Ret													10
21	(United States) Roman Felber							10	12	6							5
22	(Poland) Rafał Wołosz							11	13	11	11	11	8				4
23	(United States) Cash Felber							12	11	9							1
24	(United States) Ethan Brobston													17	13	11	0
25	(Morocco) Zach Fourie													16	11	15	0
26	(United States) Athan Sterling										12	12	Ret	Ret	Ret	13	0
–	(United States) Beckham Jacir													DNS	DNS	DNS	0
Pos	Driver	R1	R2	R3	R1	R2	R3	R1	R2	R3	R1	R2	R3	R1	R2	R3	Pts
Pos	Driver	NOL			ROA			MOH			NJM			COA			Pts

Colour	Result
Gold	Winner
Silver	Second place
Bronze	Third place
Green	Points classification
Blue	Non-points classification
Blue	Non-classified finish (NC)
Purple	Retired, not classified (Ret)
Red	Did not qualify (DNQ)
Red	Did not pre-qualify (DNPQ)
Black	Disqualified (DSQ)
White	Did not start (DNS)
White	Withdrew (WD)
White	Race cancelled (C)
Blank	Did not practice (DNP)
Blank	Did not arrive (DNA)
Blank	Excluded (EX)

**Bold** – Pole
Italics – Fastest Lap

=== Teams' standings ===
Pos	Team	Pts
1	(United States) Crosslink Kiwi Motorsport	201
2	(United States) Scuderia Buell	104
3	(United States) International Motorsport	80
4	(United States) Jensen Global Advisors	62
5	(United States) IGY6 Motorsports	54
6	(United States) Szuch Racing	34
7	(United States) Berg DMG Racing	18
8	(Canada) Atlantic Racing Team	15
