= Teddy Musella =

American racing driver (born 2009)

- Born: Teddy Musella; 25 May 2009 (age 17); Orlando, Florida, U.S.
- Nationality: (United States) American

USF Pro 2000 Championship career
- Debut season: 2026
- Current team: VRD Racing
- Car number: 25
- Starts: 18
- Wins: 0
- Podiums: 1
- Poles: 0
- Fastest laps: 0
- Best finish: 7th in 2026

Previous series
- 2025–2026 2024: USF2000 Championship; Ligier JS F4 Series

Championship titles
- 2024: Ligier JS F4 Series
- Statistics up to date as of September 29, 2026.

Teddy Musella (born 25 May 2009) is an American racing driver who last competed in the USF Pro 2000 Championship for VRD Racing. He is the 2024 Ligier JS F4 Series champion.

== Career ==
Musella began karting 2019. Spending four years in karting, he most notably finished fourth in the 2022 USPKS X30 Junior standings and seventh in the SKUSA SuperNationals in the same year.

Musella made his single-seater debut in the 2023 F4 Western Winter Series, where he won one race at New Jersey Motorsports Park. After also competing in the Lucas Oil Winter Series, Musella made a one-off appearance in USF Juniors for Zanella Racing at Barber Motorsports Park. In his only two races in the series, Musella finished tenth and seventh.

However, Musella's main program in 2024 was in the newly-created Ligier JS F4 Series, where he drove for Scuderia Buell as the team's sole full-time driver. Musella won two of the three races of the season-opening round at NOLA Motorsports Park to take the lead in points. After losing the points lead to Bacon Zelenka at Road America, Musella won the first race at Mid-Ohio, before finishing on the podium in four of the following five races. In the final round of the season at Circuit of the Americas, Musella won the first two races of the weekend on his way to the inaugural Ligier JS F4 title.

Despite winning a scholarship to race in the Formula 4 United States Championship, Musella joined VRD Racing to compete in the USF2000 Championship alongside Thomas Schrage, Christian Cameron and Ryan Giannetta. After taking his first top five of the season in the second round at NOLA Motorsports Park, Musella took the pole for both races at Indianapolis before taking his maiden series podium in race two by finishing second to teammate Schrage. Following a sixth-place finish at Indianapolis Raceway Park, Musella took his maiden series win in the following round at Road America. Musella then scored six podiums in the last eight races of the season, including his second win of the season at the season-ending round in Portland.

The following year, Musella continued with VRD to step up to USF Pro 2000, as well as making a one-off appearance with the same team in USF2000, In his rookie season in USF Pro 2000, Musella scored a lone podium in race two at Indianapolis to end the year seventh in points. Towards the end of the year, Musella partook in Indy NXT's evaluation test at the same venue for AJ Foyt Racing.

== Karting record ==
=== Karting career summary ===
Season	Series	Team	Position
2021	SKUSA SuperNationals — X30 Junior	Zanella Racing	38th
2022	SKUSA SuperNationals — X30 Junior	Rolison Performance Group	7th
2022	USPKS — X30 Pro Junior		15th
2024	RMC Winter Trophy — Junior Max		35th

== Racing record ==
=== Racing career summary ===
Season	Series	Team	Races	Wins	Poles	F/Laps	Podiums	Points	Position
2023	Lucas Oil Formula Car Race Series		3	0	0	0	0	72	12th
2024	Ligier JS F4 Series	Scuderia Buell	15	5	3	5	12	254	**1st**
2024	USF Juniors	Zanella Racing	2	0	0	0	0	25	27th
2025	USF2000 Championship	VRD Racing	18	2	2	2	9	371	**2nd**
2026	USF2000 Championship	VRD Racing	2	0	0	0	0	22	27th
2026	USF Pro 2000 Championship	VRD Racing	18	0	0	0	1	228	7th

=== Complete Ligier JS F4 Series results ===
(key) (Races in bold indicate pole position; races in italics indicate fastest lap)

Year	Team	1	2	3	4	5	6	7	8	9	10	11	12	13	14	15	DC	Points
2024	Scuderia Buell	**NOL**; **1**; 1	NOL; 2; 2	NOL; 3; 1	**ROA**; **1**; 3	ROA; 2; 10	ROA; 3; 5	MOH; 1; 1	MOH; 2; 2	MOH; 3; 2	NJM; 1; 3	NJM; 2; 5	NJM; 3; 3	**COA**; **1**; 1	COA; 2; 1	COA; 3; 2	1st	254

=== American open-wheel racing results ===
==== USF Juniors ====
(key) (Races in bold indicate pole position) (Races in italics indicate fastest lap) (Races with * indicate most race laps led)

Year	Team	1	2	3	4	5	6	7	8	9	10	11	12	13	14	15	16	Rank	Points
2024	Zanella Racing	NOL; 1	NOL; 2	NOL; 3	ALA; 1; 10	ALA; 2; 7	VIR; 1	VIR; 2	VIR; 3	MOH; 1	MOH; 2	ROA; 1	ROA; 2	ROA; 3	POR; 1	POR; 2	POR; 3	27th	25

==== USF2000 Championship ====
(key) (Races in bold indicate pole position) (Races in italics indicate fastest lap) (Races with * indicate most race laps led)

Year	Team	1	2	3	4	5	6	7	8	9	10	11	12	13	14	15	16	17	18	Rank	Points
2025	VRD Racing	STP; 1; 14	STP; 2; 8	NOL; 1; 5	NOL; 2; 8	NOL; 3; 6	**IMS**; **1**; 4	**IMS**; **2**; 2	IRP; 6	ROA; 1; 2*	ROA; 2; 1*	MOH; 1; 4	MOH; 2; 3	MOH; 3; 3	TOR; 1; 3	TOR; 2; 4	POR; 1; 3	POR; 2; 3	POR; 3; 1	2nd	371
2026	VRD Racing	STP; 1; 12	STP; 2; 8	IMS; 1	IMS; 2	IMS; 3	IRP	ROA1; 1	ROA1; 2	ROA1; 3	MOH; 1	MOH; 2	POR; 1	POR; 2	MAR; 1	MAR; 2	ROA2; 1	ROA2; 2	ROA2; 3	27th	22

==== USF Pro 2000 Championship ====
(key) (Races in bold indicate pole position) (Races in italics indicate fastest lap) (Races with * indicate most race laps led)

Year	Team	1	2	3	4	5	6	7	8	9	10	11	12	13	14	15	16	17	18	Rank	Points
2026	VRD Racing	ARL; 1; 15	ARL; 2; 18	IMS; 1; 13	IMS; 2; 3	IRP; 7	ROA; 1; 7	ROA; 2; 7	MOH; 1; 5	MOH; 2; 7	MOH; 3; 7	POR; 1; 13	POR; 2; 13	MAR; 1; 8	MAR; 2; 5	MIL; 17	ROA; 1; 9	ROA; 2; 6	ROA; 3; 6	7th	228
