= NOLA Motorsports Park =

Motorsports facility in Avondale, Louisiana, U.S.

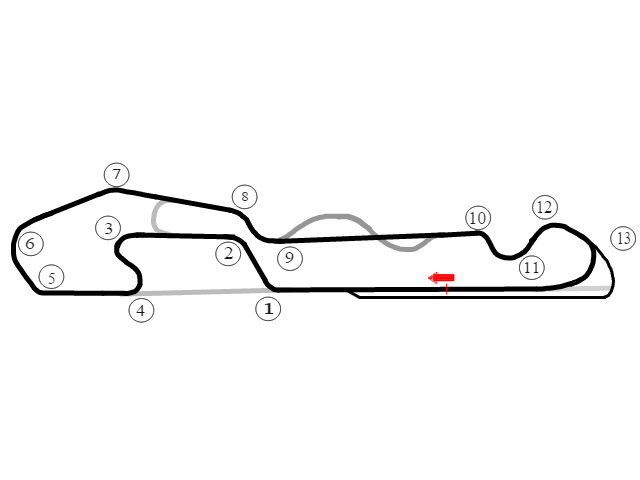
- 13-Turn A Course (2015–present)
- Location: 11075 Nicolle Boulevard, Avondale, Louisiana 70094
- Coordinates: 29°53′1″N 90°11′52″W
- FIA Grade: 2 (2 layouts)
- Owner: Laney Chouest (2011–present)
- Broke ground: December 2009; 16 years ago
- Opened: 2011
- Construction cost: $62 million
- Architect: Alan Wilson
- Major events: Current: FR Americas (2018, 2022–present); 24 Hours of Lemons (2018–2019, 2021–present); Former: IndyCar Series; Indy Grand Prix of Louisiana (2015); USF Pro 2000 Championship (2015, 2024–2025); USF2000 Championship (2015, 2024–2025); Trans-Am Series (2015–2016, 2023–2024); GT World Challenge America (2022–2023); Cooper Tires WinterFest (2014–2015); AMA Superbike Championship (2012)
- Website: http://www.nolamotor.com/

A Course (2011–present)
- Surface: Asphalt
- Length: 2.748 mi (4.423 km)
- Turns: 17
- Race lap record: 1:32.336 ( (United States) Spencer Pigot, Star Formula Mazda 'Pro', 2014, Pro Mazda)

13-Turn A Course (2015–present)
- Surface: Asphalt
- Length: 2.672 mi (4.300 km)
- Turns: 13
- Race lap record: 1:28.5583 ( (New Zealand) Scott Dixon, Dallara DW12, 2015, IndyCar)

B Course (2011–present)
- Surface: Asphalt
- Length: 1.877 mi (3.020 km)
- Turns: 12

C Course (2011–present)
- Surface: Asphalt
- Length: 2.312 mi (3.720 km)
- Turns: 12

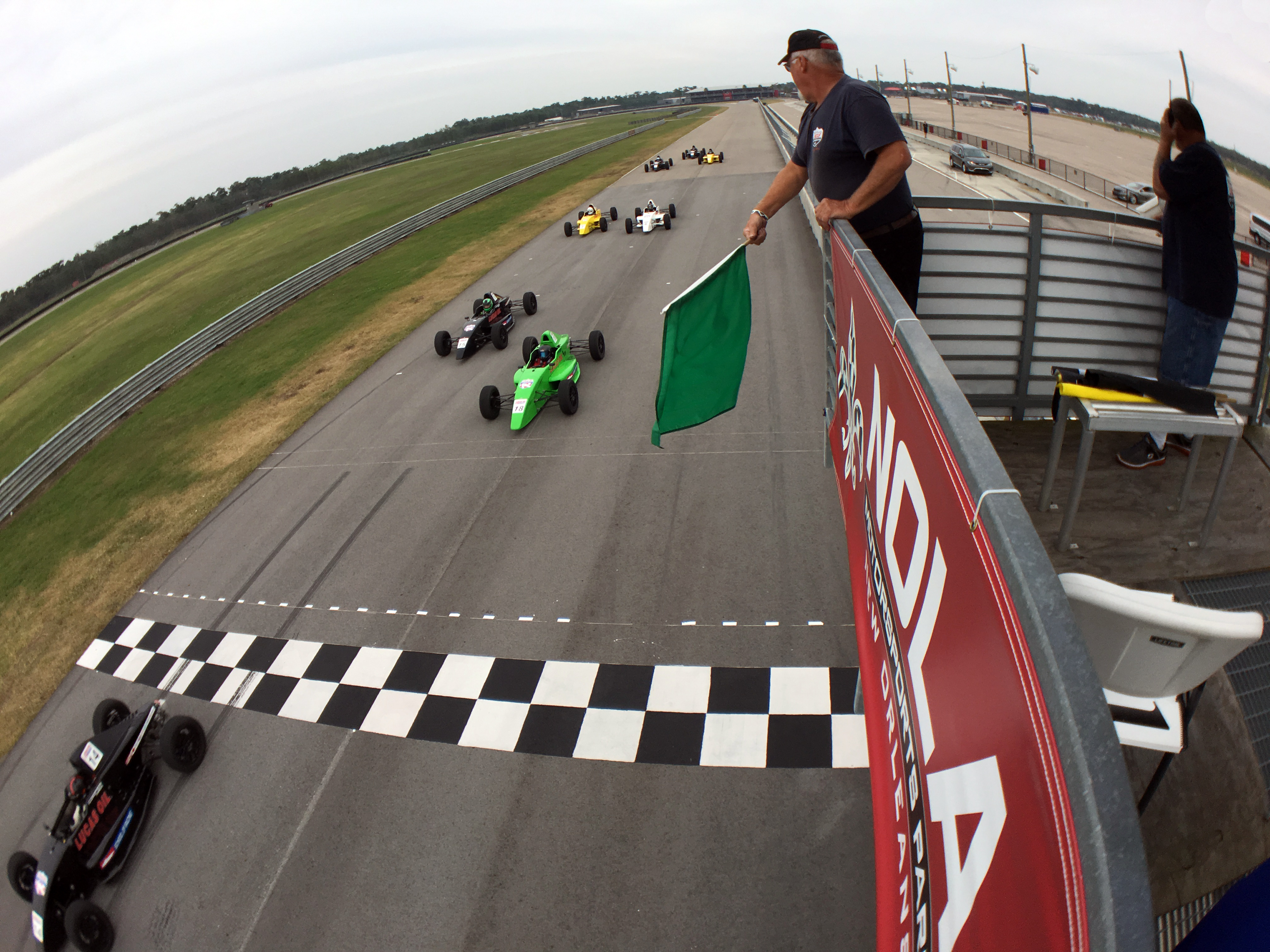
Race start at NOLA Motorsports Park

NOLA Motorsports Park is a motor racing track and motorsports service facility in Avondale, Louisiana. It includes an FIA Grade 2 road course<, an outdoor karting track, and a 300,000 square ft. soft-grade asphalt skid pad for drifting and autocross.

The kart circuit and North Track opened in Q4 2011.

Future plans include completion of an off-roading area, a supercar driving experience, and more.

== Design ==
NOLA Motorsports Park was designed by Alan Wilson, whose other designs include Utah Motorsports Campus and Barber Motorsports Park. In addition to the two international standard race tracks, the facility also features three karting tracks, full service seven acre kart center, paddock, on-site speed shop, clubhouse, eight acre autocross pad.

The park was designed with electronic systems with over 100 miles of fiber optics and timing and scoring equipment to allow for accurate timing on both the main and karting tracks.

=== Activities ===
East of the main track is a short and thin track. Usually being divided up in the center, it serves its north side as the rental go-kart track. The south can be rented out and holds smaller events such as motorcycle races.

There is motorcycle safety training and on-track exotic car rentals. Housed at Nola Motorsports Park for rental are the Huracán LP610-4, the Ferrari 458 Italia, the Porsche 911 GT3, and the Slingshot SLR.

=== Accidents ===
On April 15, 2017, Jesus Martinez was riding an unspecified motorcycle on the east track about 8:30 p.m. when he inadvertently hit another rider and suffered life-threatening injuries. He later died of injuries shortly after getting an ambulance to University Medical Center. The accident was found to be a racing incident caused by rider error and no outside debris on the track was found.

On September 22, 2018, Jeff Hagaman was topping out his 2000 hp heavily modified 2010 Nissan GTR during a speed trials event laid out on a half-mile course utilising the pit straight of the circuit. He was in the shutdown area after finishing his half-mile run at speeds exceeding 200 mph (320 km/h) during the run when he lost control of the vehicle. He flipped upwards landing on the front right side of the bumper; this was the collision that was assumed killed him. "It was surprising" friends and family said. Jeff was 52 years old and has been racing most of his life, from Granite Falls, North Carolina, he was experienced. The event was "unsanctioned," without requiring a roll cage (which is required in the NHRA if a car exceeds 135 mph (217 km/h)).

== Layout maps ==
NOLA Motorsports Park Layout Maps
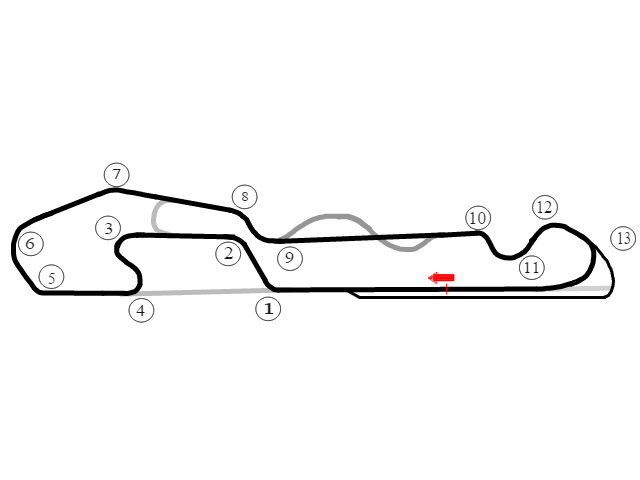
13-Turn A Course (2015–present)

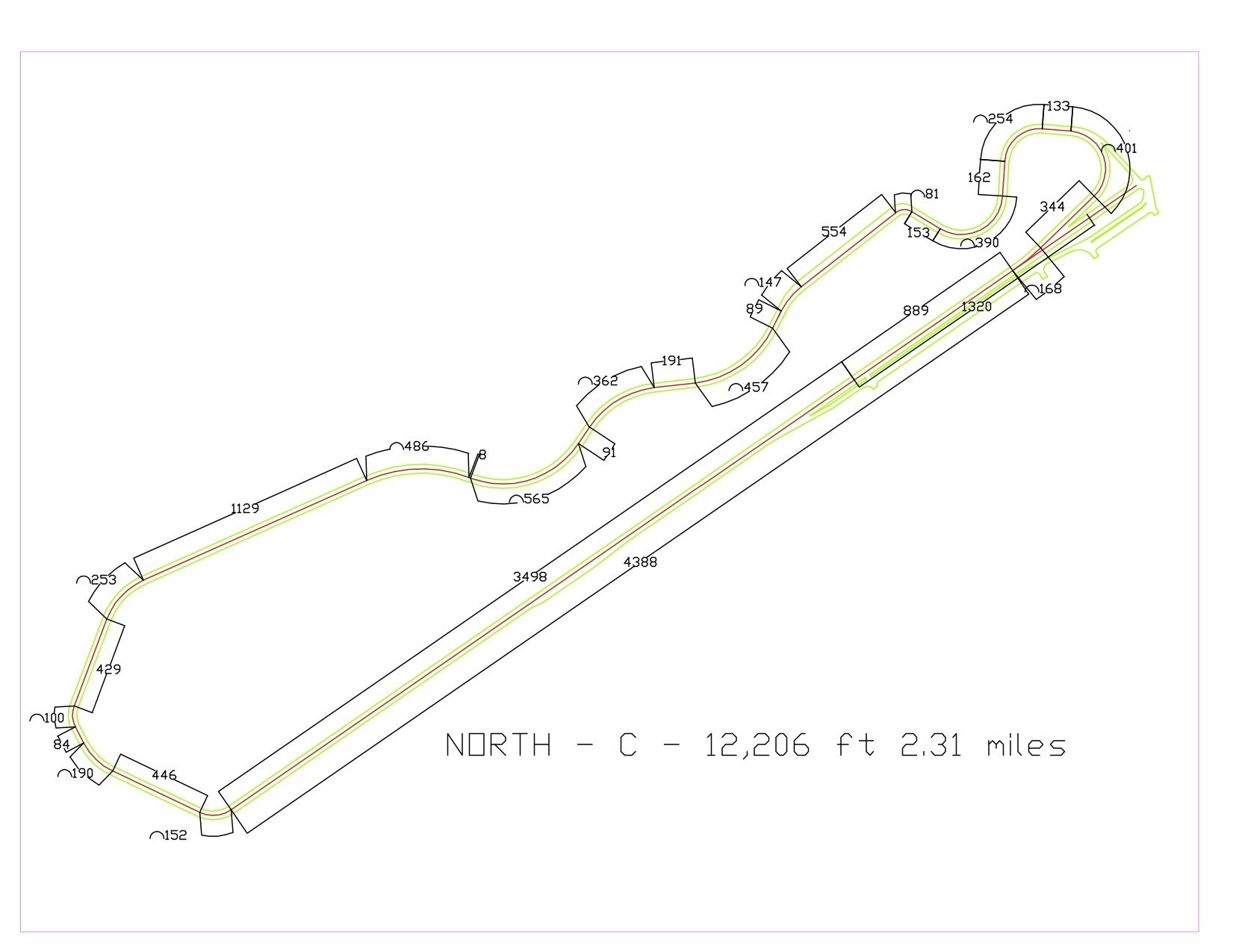
C Course (2011–present)

== Events ==
Current

- February: National Auto Sport Association
- March: 24 Hours of Lemons
- April: Formula Regional Americas Championship NOLA SpeedTour, Formula 4 United States Championship, National Auto Sport Association

Former

- AMA Superbike Championship
  - Triumph Big Kahuna New Orleans (2012)
- ChampCar Endurance Series (2012)
- Cooper Tires WinterFest (2014–2015)
- Ferrari Challenge North America (2015)
- GT America Series (2023)
- GT World Challenge America (2022–2023)
- GT4 America Series (2022–2023)
- IMSA GT3 Cup Challenge (2015)
- IMSA Prototype Lites (2015)
- IndyCar Series
  - Indy Grand Prix of Louisiana (2015)
- Lamborghini Super Trofeo North America (2022)
- Mazda MX-5 Cup (2015)
- TC America Series (2022–2023)
- Trans-Am Series (2015–2016, 2023–2024)
- USF2000 Championship (2015, 2024–2025)
- USF Juniors (2024–2025)
- USF Pro 2000 Championship (2015, 2024–2025)

== Lap records ==
As of April 2025, the fastest official race lap records on the NOLA Motorsports Park are:

Category	Time	Driver	Vehicle	Event
A Course (2011–present): 2.748 mi (4.422 km)
Pro Mazda	1:32.336	Spencer Pigot	Star Formula Mazda 'Pro'	2014 New Orleans Pro Mazda Winterfest round
Formula Regional	1:33.523	Raoul Hyman	Ligier JS F3	2022 New Orleans FR Americas round
GT3	1:34.800	Giacomo Altoè	Lamborghini Huracán GT3 Evo	2022 New Orleans GT World Challenge America round
US F2000	1:35.650	Aaron Telitz	Van Diemen DP08	2014 New Orleans US F2000 Winterfest round
Lamborghini Super Trofeo	1:36.476	Loris Spinelli	Lamborghini Huracán Super Trofeo Evo2	2022 New Orleans Lamborghini Super Trofeo North America round
TA1	1:37.029	Matthew Brabham	Ford Mustang Trans-Am	2023 New Orleans Trans-Am round
Superbike	1:39.487	Josh Hayes	Yamaha YZF-R1	2012 Triumph Big Kahuna New Orleans
Formula 4	1:39.730	Alex Popow Jr.	Ligier JS F422	2025 New Orleans F4 United States round
Supersport	1:42.374	Cameron Beaubier	Yamaha YZF-R6	2012 Triumph Big Kahuna New Orleans
TA2	1:42.463	Raphael Matos	Ford Mustang Trans-Am	2023 New Orleans Trans-Am round
GT4	1:44.284	John Capestro-Dubets	BMW M4 GT4 Gen II	2023 New Orleans GT4 America round
TC America	1:48.430	Kyle Loh	Honda Civic Type R TCX	2023 New Orleans TC America round
13-Turn A Course (2015–present): 2.670 mi (4.297 km)
IndyCar	1:28.5583	Scott Dixon	Dallara DW12	2015 Indy Grand Prix of Louisiana
USF Pro 2000	1:30.3323	Max Garcia	Tatuus IP-22	2025 USF Pro 2000 Continental Tire Grand Prix of Louisiana
USF2000	1:34.1799	Liam McNeilly	Tatuus USF-22	2025 USF2000 Continental Tire Grand Prix of Louisiana
Prototype Lites	1:36.012	Kenton Koch	Élan DP02	2015 New Orleans IMSA Prototype Lites round
USF Juniors	1:38.5691	Ty Fisher	Tatuus JR-23	2025 USF Juniors Continental Tire Grand Prix of Louisiana
Porsche Carrera Cup	1:41.118	Elliott Skeer	Porsche 911 (991 I) GT3 Cup	2015 New Orleans Porsche GT3 Cup Challenge USA round
Mustang Challenge	1:47.308	Craig Capaldi	Ford Mustang Dark Horse R	2025 New Orleans Mustang Cup round
Mazda MX-5 Cup	1:57.302	Chad McCumbee	Mazda MX-5 (NC)	2015 New Orleans Mazda MX-5 Cup round

== Gallery ==
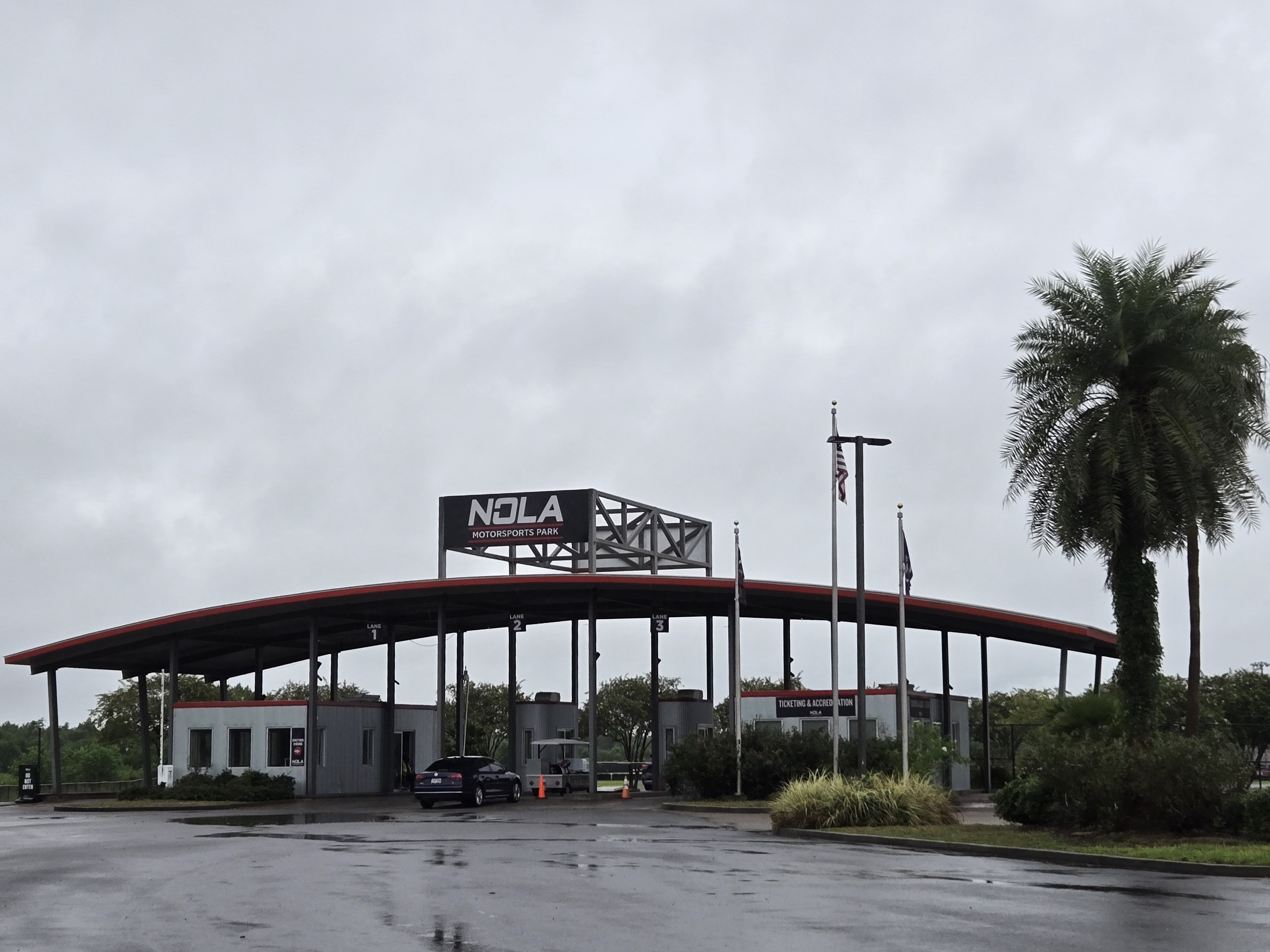

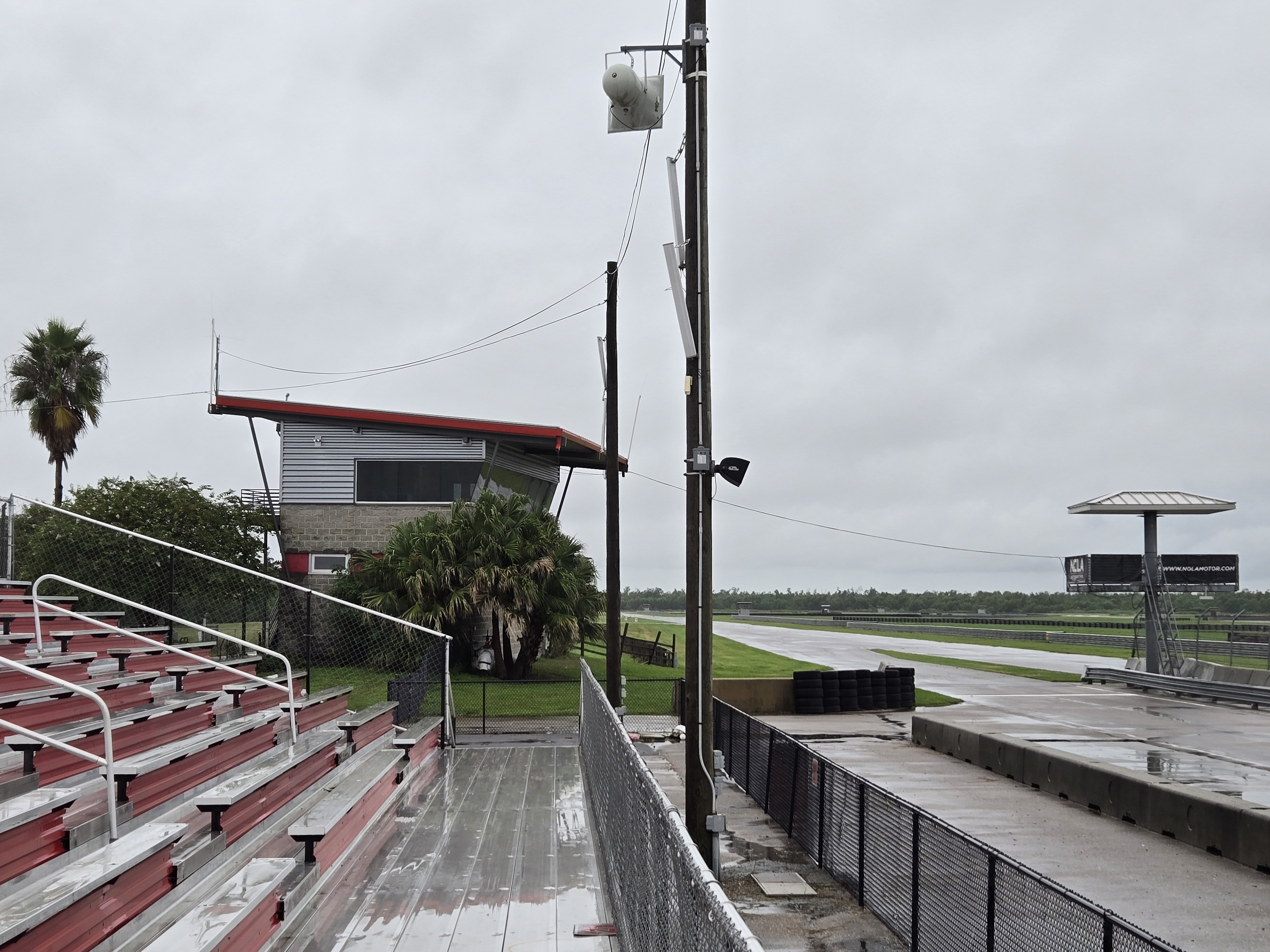

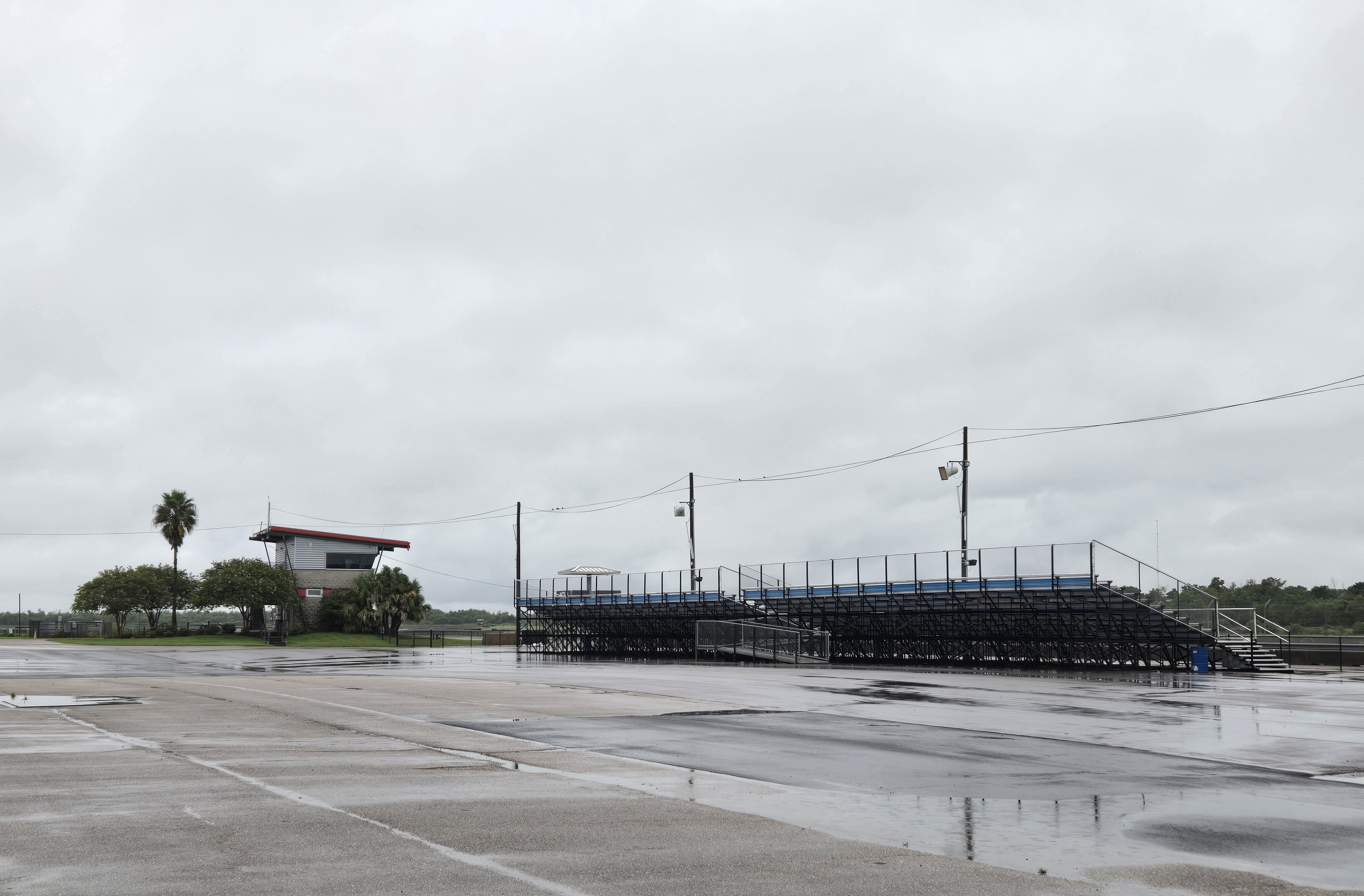

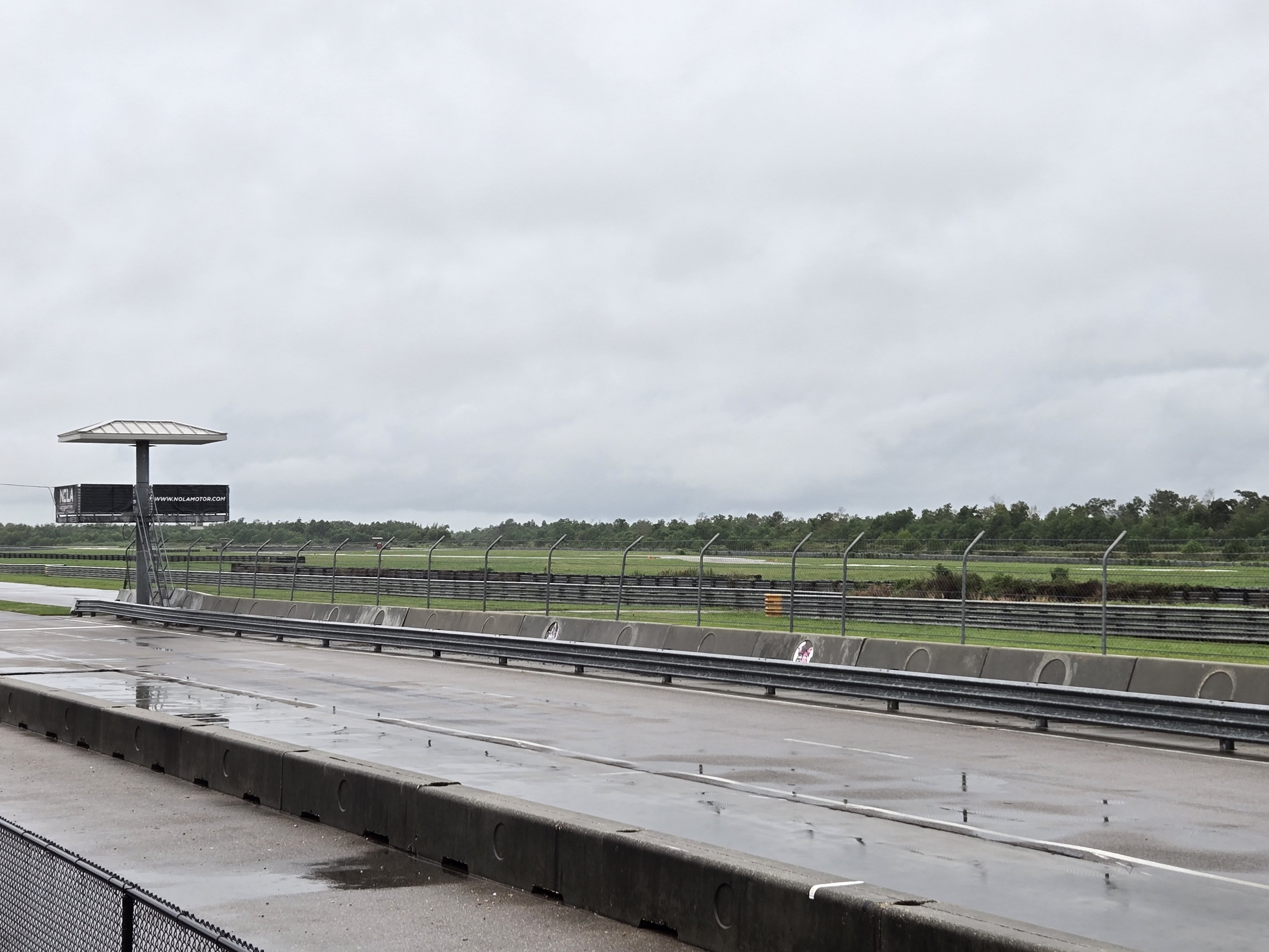

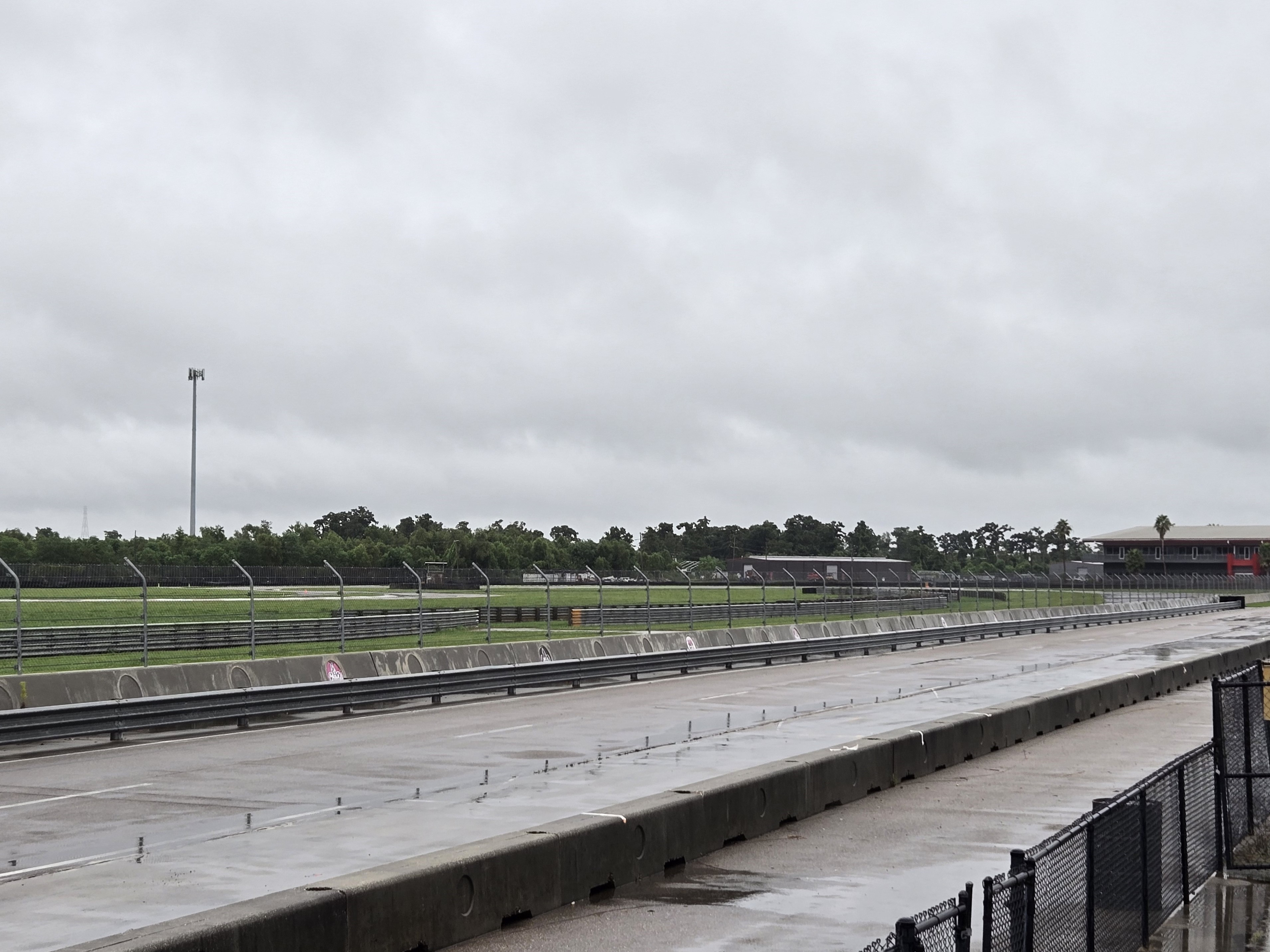

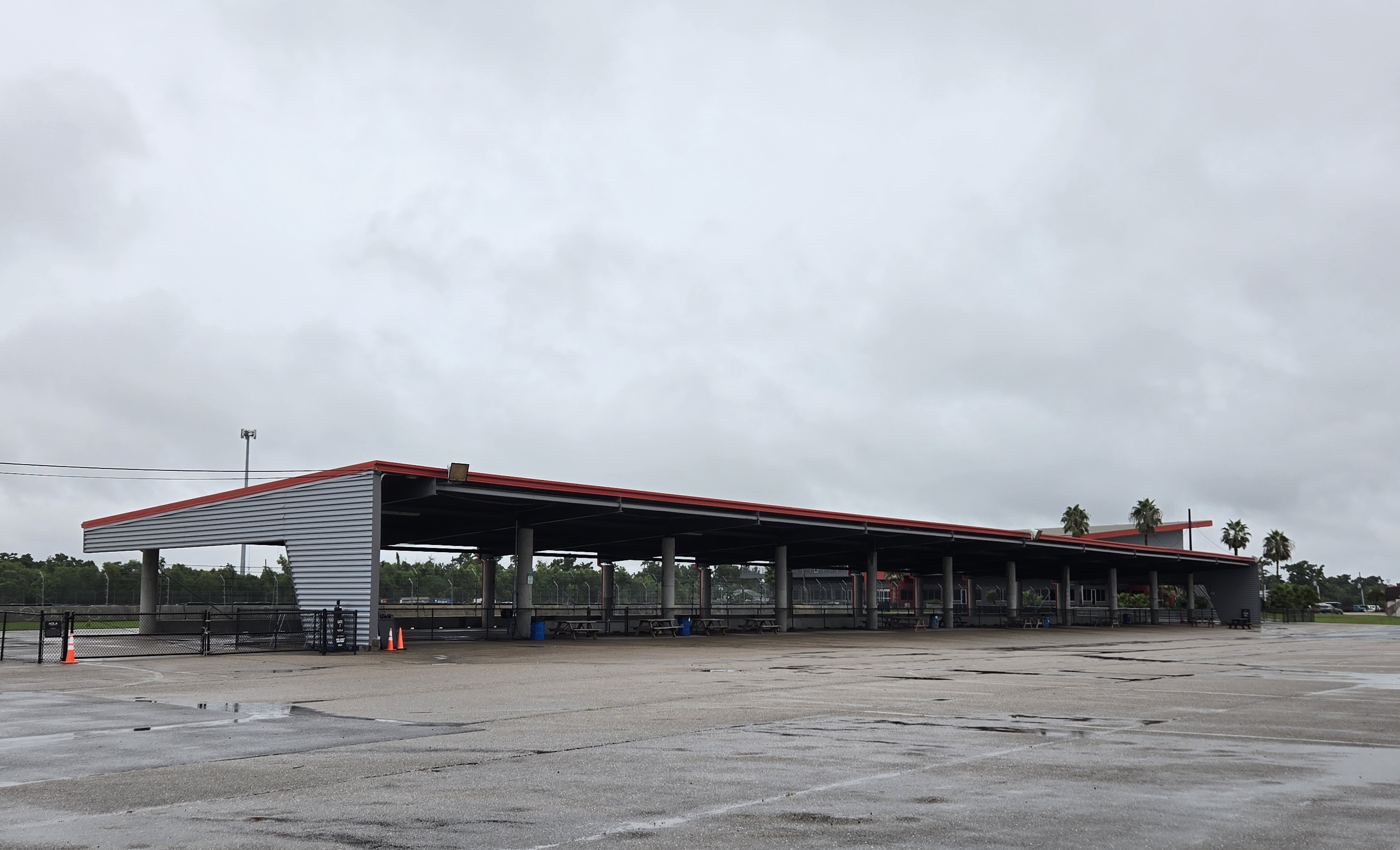

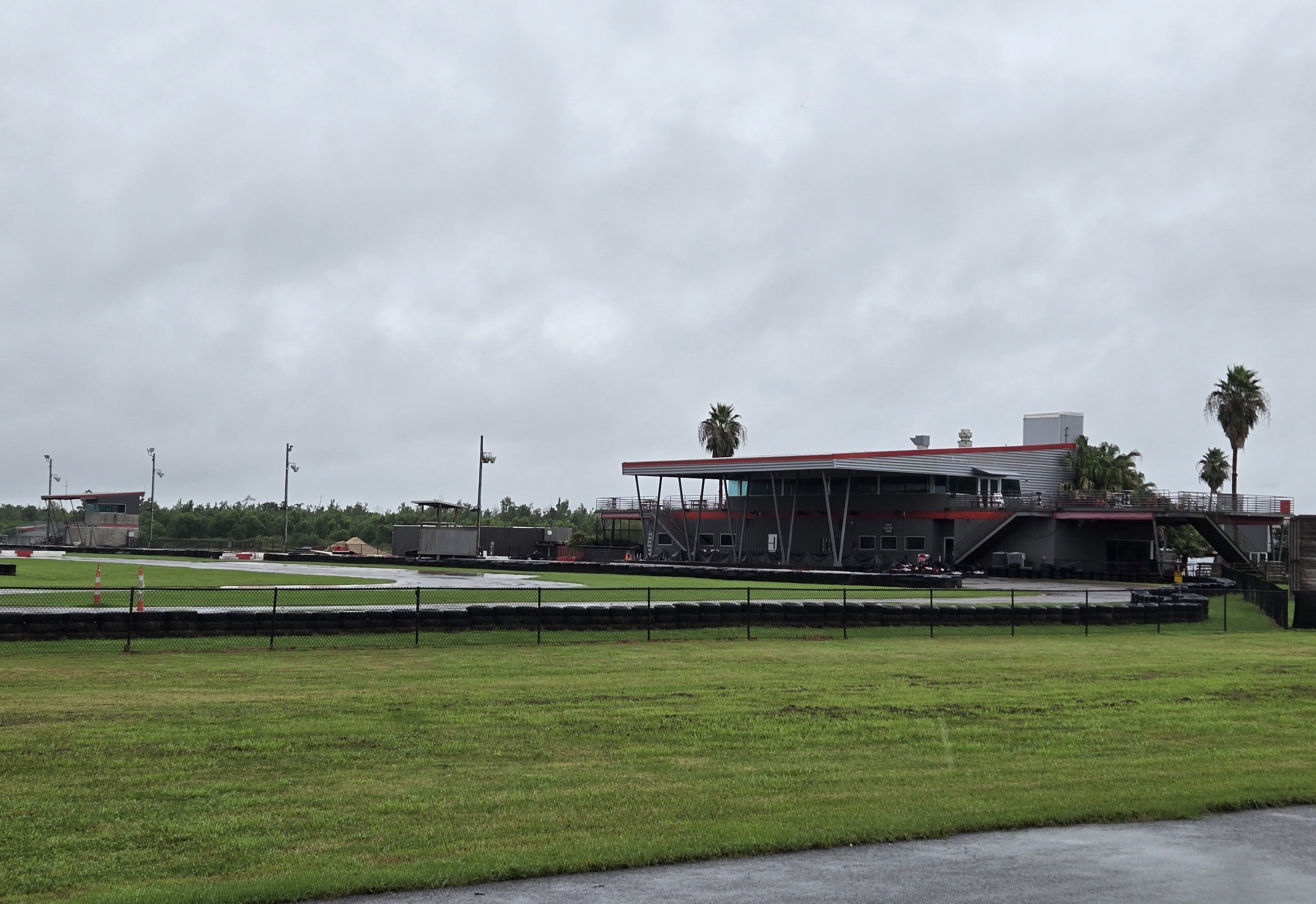

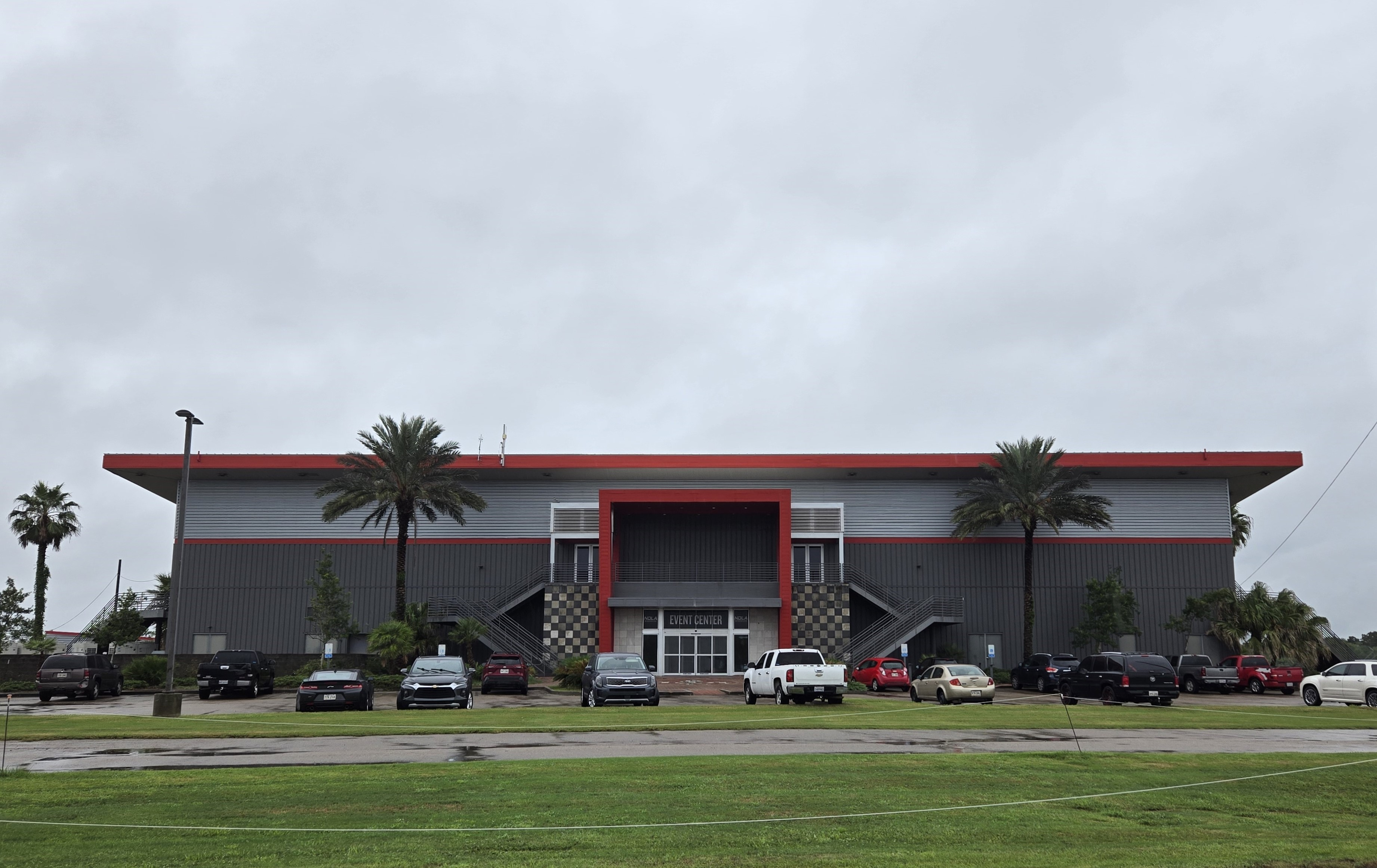
