= Arias Deukmedjian =

American racing driver (born 2004)

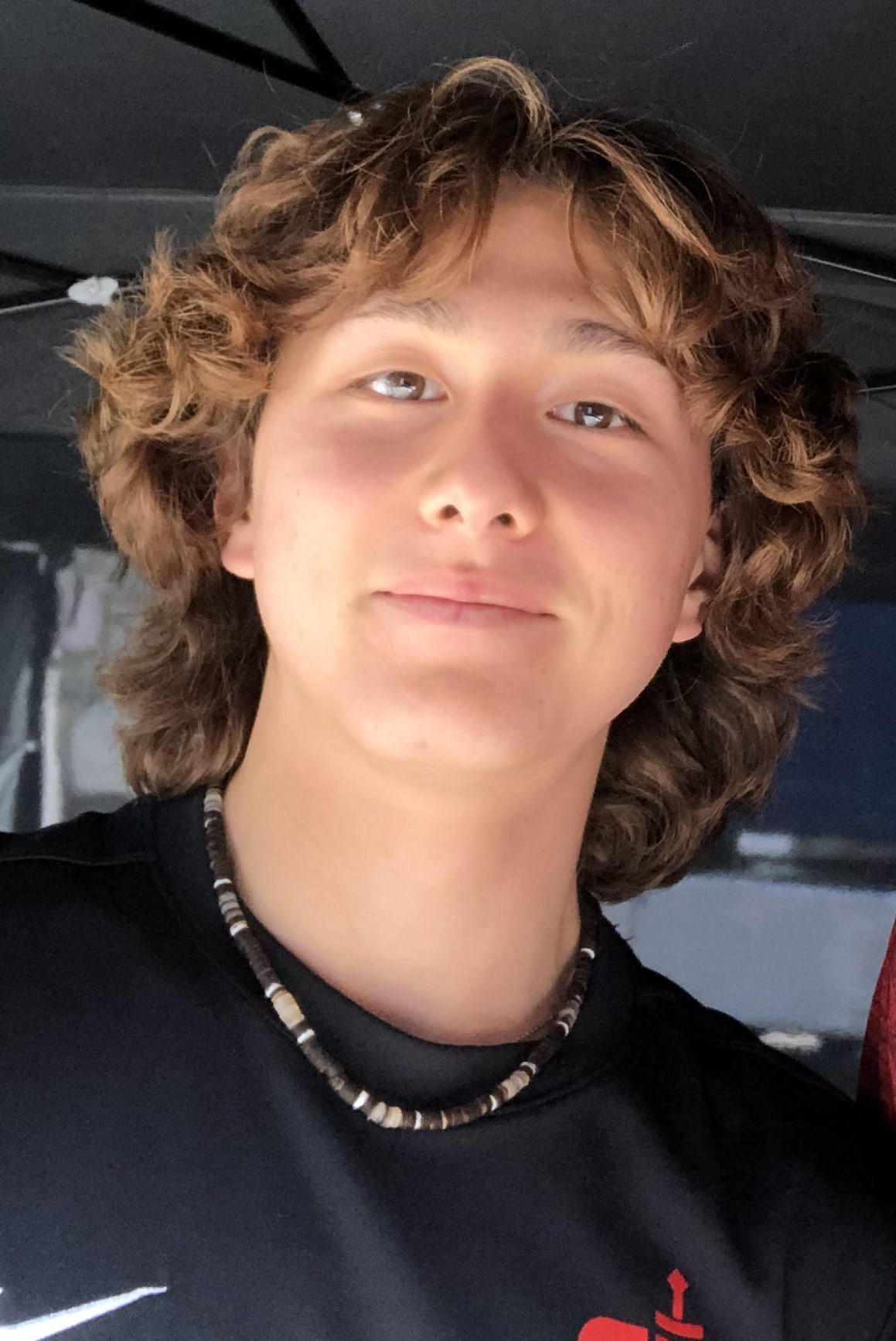
- Deukmedjian in 2022
- Nationality: (United States) American
- Born: 25 November 2004 (age 21) Merritt Island, Florida, U.S.

Formula Regional European Championship career
- Debut season: 2021
- Current team: FA Racing by MP
- Categorisation: FIA Silver
- Car number: 89
- Starts: 2
- Wins: 0
- Podiums: 0
- Poles: 0
- Fastest laps: 0
- Best finish: NC in 2021

Previous series
- 2022 2021 2021 2018: Italian F4 Championship; FR Americas Championship; F4 United States Championship; F2000 Championship Series

Arias Deukmedjian (born 25 November 2004) is an American former racing driver of Korean and Armenian descent. A podium finisher in the Formula 4 United States Championship, he last competed in the Italian F4 Championship and the ADAC F4 Championship with Van Amersfoort Racing. He has previously competed in the Formula Regional European Championship with FA Racing by MP.

== Career ==
=== Lower formulae ===
Deukmedjian made his car racing debut in 2018, driving in two rounds of the F2000 Championship Series. He ended up with a best finish of eighth at Virginia International Raceway.

For the 2021 season, Deukmedjian would make his full transition into single-seaters, teaming up with Crosslink/Kiwi Motorsport for the F4 United States Championship. He began his season in strong style, taking two podiums at the season opener at Road Atlanta, where he fought for the win in a rain-affected Race 2. However, following just two further rounds, Deukmedjian exited the series.

=== Indy Pro 2000 ===
Deukmedjian took part in the Chris Griffis Memorial Test in 2021, driving an Indy Pro 2000 car run by Deuk Spine Racing.

=== FIA Formula 3 ===
In September 2022, Deukmedjian took part in the FIA Formula 3 post-season test at Jerez, driving for Carlin on all three days.

== Racing record ==
=== Racing career summary ===
Season	Series	Team	Races	Wins	Poles	F/Laps	Podiums	Points	Position
2018	F2000 Championship Series	N/A	3	0	0	0	0	0	NC†
2021	Formula 4 United States Championship	Crosslink/Kiwi Motorsport	7	0	0	1	2	54	9th
2021	Formula Regional Americas Championship	Velocity Racing Development	3	0	0	0	0	13	18th
2021	Formula Regional European Championship	FA Racing by MP	2	0	0	0	0	0	NC†
2022	Italian F4 Championship	Van Amersfoort Racing	9	0	0	0	0	1	27th
2022	ADAC Formula 4 Championship	Van Amersfoort Racing	6	0	0	0	0	0	NC†

^{†} As Deukmedjian was a guest driver, he was ineligible to score points.
* Season still in progress.

=== Complete Formula 4 United States Championship results ===
(key) (Races in bold indicate pole position) (Races in italics indicate fastest lap)

Year	Team	1	2	3	4	5	6	7	8	9	10	11	12	13	14	15	16	17	Pos	Points
2021	Crosslink/Kiwi Motorsport	ATL; 1; 6	ATL; 2; 3	ATL; 3; 3	ROA; 1 Ret	ROA; 2 EX	ROA; 3; 4	MOH; 1; 8	MOH; 2 EX	MOH; 3; 12	BRA; 1	BRA; 2	BRA; 3	VIR; 1	VIR; 2	VIR; 3	COA; 1	COA; 2	9th	54

=== Complete Formula Regional Americas Championship results ===
(key) (Races in bold indicate pole position) (Races in italics indicate fastest lap)

Year	Team	1	2	3	4	5	6	7	8	9	10	11	12	13	14	15	16	17	18	DC	Points
2021	Velocity Racing Development	ATL; 1	ATL; 2	ATL; 3	ROA; 1	ROA; 2	ROA; 3	MOH; 1	MOH; 2	MOH; 3	BRA; 1	BRA; 2	BRA; 3	VIR; 1; 9	VIR; 2; 10	VIR; 3; 5	COA; 1	COA; 2	COA; 3	18th	13

=== Complete Formula Regional European Championship results ===
(key) (Races in bold indicate pole position) (Races in italics indicate fastest lap)

Year	Team	1	2	3	4	5	6	7	8	9	10	11	12	13	14	15	16	17	18	19	20	DC	Points
2021	FA Racing by MP	IMO; 1	IMO; 2	CAT; 1	CAT; 2	MCO; 1	MCO; 2	LEC; 1	LEC; 2	ZAN; 1	ZAN; 2	SPA; 1	SPA; 2	RBR; 1	RBR; 2	VAL; 1	VAL; 2	MUG; 1; 27	MUG; 2; 33	MNZ; 1	MNZ; 2	NC†	-

^{†} As Deukmedjian was a guest driver, he was ineligible to score points.
* Season still in progress.

=== Complete Italian F4 Championship results ===
(key) (Races in bold indicate pole position) (Races in italics indicate fastest lap)

Year	Team	1	2	3	4	5	6	7	8	9	10	11	12	13	14	15	16	17	18	19	20	21	22	DC	Points
2022	Van Amersfoort Racing	IMO; 1; 26†	IMO; 2; 33†	IMO; 3; 15	MIS; 1 Ret	MIS; 2; 17	MIS; 3; 10	SPA; 1; 18	SPA; 2; 26	SPA; 3 Ret	VLL; 1 WD	VLL; 2 WD	VLL; 3 WD	RBR; 1	RBR; 2	RBR; 3	RBR; 4	MNZ; 1	MNZ; 2	MNZ; 3	MUG; 1	MUG; 2	MUG; 3	27th	1

=== Complete ADAC Formula 4 Championship results ===
(key) (Races in bold indicate pole position) (Races in italics indicate fastest lap)

Year	Team	1	2	3	4	5	6	7	8	9	10	11	12	13	14	15	16	17	18	DC	Points
2022	Van Amersfoort Racing	SPA; 1	SPA; 2	SPA; 3	HOC; 1; 8	HOC; 2 Ret	HOC; 3; 15	ZAN; 1; 14	ZAN; 2; 9	ZAN; 3 Ret	NÜR1; 1	NÜR1; 2	NÜR1; 3	LAU; 1	LAU; 2	LAU; 3	NÜR2; 1	NÜR2; 2	NÜR2; 3	NC	–
