= Cooper Becklin =

American racing driver (born 2004)

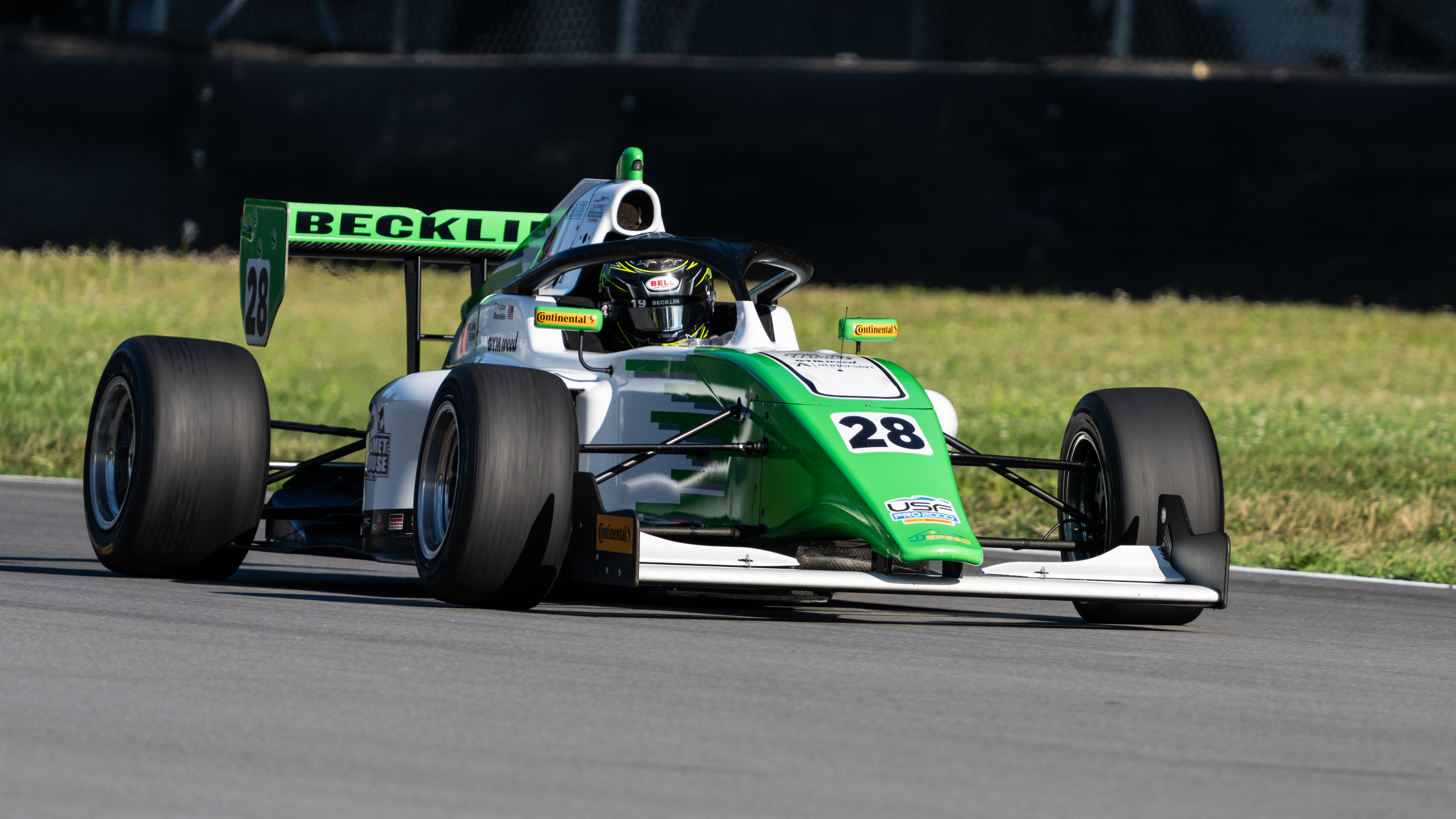
- Becklin at the Mid-Ohio Sports Car Course in 2024
- Nationality: (United States) American
- Born: August 28, 2004 (age 22) West Linn, Oregon, United States

USF Pro 2000 Championship career
- Debut season: 2024
- Current team: Turn 3 Motorsport
- Car number: 28
- Former teams: TJ Speed Motorsports
- Starts: 9
- Wins: 0
- Podiums: 0
- Poles: 0
- Fastest laps: 0
- Best finish: 18th in 2024

Previous series
- 2021–23 2021 2020 2020: Formula Regional Americas Championship; Formula 4 United States Championship; Formula Pro USA F4 Winter Series; Formula Pro USA – F4 Western Championship

Cooper Becklin (born August 28, 2004) is an American racing driver competing in the 2025 USF Pro 2000 Championship for Turn 3 Motorsport. He previously competed in the 2024 USF Pro 2000 Championship driving for TJ Speed Motorsports. He previously competed in the Formula Regional Americas Championship with Crosslink Kiwi Motorsport.

== Career ==
=== Formula 4 United States Championship ===
On March 24, 2021, it was announced that Becklin would compete in the 2021 Formula 4 United States Championship driving for Crosslink/Kiwi Motorsport. Although the deal was for the full season, Becklin only competed in the first three races, finishing only the first one of the three.

=== Formula Regional Americas Championship ===
==== 2021 ====
Becklin would debut in the 2021 Formula Regional Americas Championship with Crosslink/Kiwi Motorsport at the Virginia International Raceway round. He would have a best finish of sixth at the second race at the Circuit of the Americas.

==== 2022 ====
Becklin would return to the championship in 2022 for the full season once again with Crosslink Kiwi Motorsport. He would get his maiden podium at Mid-Ohio to finish third. Becklin would also finish a career best second at Virginia International Raceway behind series champion Raoul Hyman.

==== 2023 ====
In 2023, Becklin would return to the championship with Crosslink Kiwi Motorsport. He would get his first win in the championship in the third race at Virginia International Raceway.

=== USF Pro 2000 Championship ===
==== 2024 ====
Mid-way through 2024, Becklin signed with TJ Speed Motorsports to drive select races in the 2024 USF Pro 2000 Championship starting at the Road America round. He would finish eighteenth in the standings come seasons end.

==== 2025 ====
Becklin returned to the championship and signed with Turn 3 Motorsport for a full-season campaign for the 2025 season.

== Racing record ==
=== Racing career summary ===
Season	Series	Team	Races	Wins	Poles	F/Laps	Podiums	Points	Position
2020	Formula Pro USA - F4 Western Championship	World Speed Motorsports	8	1	0	1	7	143	**3rd**
2020	Formula Pro USA F4 Winter Series	World Speed Motorsports	2	0	0	0	0	18	11th
2021	Formula 4 United States Championship	Crosslink/Kiwi Motorsport	2	0	0	0	0	0	29th
2021	Formula Regional Americas Championship	Crosslink/Kiwi Motorsport	6	0	0	0	0	30	16th
2022	Formula Regional Americas Championship	Crosslink Kiwi Motorsport	18	0	0	1	2	132	7th
2023	Formula Regional Americas Championship	Crosslink Kiwi Motorsport	18	1	0	3	15	251	**3rd**
2024	USF Pro 2000 Championship	TJ Speed Motorsports	9	0	0	0	0	90	18th
2025	USF Pro 2000 Championship	Turn 3 Motorsport	18	0	0	0	1	197	9th

* Season still in progress.

=== American open-wheel racing results ===
==== Complete Formula 4 United States Championship results ====
(key) (Races in bold indicate pole position) (Races in italics indicate fastest lap)

Year	Team	1	2	3	4	5	6	7	8	9	10	11	12	13	14	15	16	17	Pos	Points
2021	Crosslink/Kiwi Motorsport	ATL; 1; 11	ATL; 2 Ret	ATL; 3 DNS	ROA; 1	ROA; 2	ROA; 3	MOH; 1	MOH; 2	MOH; 3	BRA; 1	BRA; 2	BRA; 3	VIR; 1	VIR; 2	VIR; 3	COA; 1	COA; 2	29th	0

==== Complete Formula Regional Americas Championship results ====
(key) (Races in bold indicate pole position) (Races in italics indicate fastest lap)

Year	Team	1	2	3	4	5	6	7	8	9	10	11	12	13	14	15	16	17	18	DC	Points
2021	Crosslink/Kiwi Motorsport	ATL; 1	ATL; 2	ATL; 3	ROA; 1	ROA; 2	ROA; 3	MOH; 1	MOH; 2	MOH; 3	BRA; 1	BRA; 2	BRA; 3	VIR; 1; 7	VIR; 2; 7	VIR; 3; 8	COA; 1; 7	COA; 2; 6	COA; 3; 12	16th	30
2022	Crosslink Kiwi Motorsport	NOL; 1 NC	NOL; 2; 8	NOL; 3; 10	ROA; 1; 8	ROA; 2; 7	ROA; 3; 7	MOH; 1; 8	MOH; 2; 7	MOH; 3; 3	NJM; 1; 4	NJM; 2; 6	NJM; 3; 4	VIR; 1; 5	VIR; 2; 6	VIR; 3; 2	COA; 1; 7	COA; 2; 9	COA; 3; 5	7th	132
2023	Crosslink Kiwi Motorsport	NOL; 1; 3	NOL; 2; 2	NOL; 3; 11†	ROA; 1; 3	ROA; 2; 3	ROA; 3; 3	MOH; 1; 3	MOH; 2; 3	MOH; 3; 3	NJM; 1; 3	NJM; 2; 3	NJM; 3; 3	VIR; 1; 3	VIR; 2; 3	VIR; 3; 1	COA; 1; 2	COA; 2; 5	COA; 3 Ret	3rd	251

† Becklin did not finish, but was classified.

==== USF Pro 2000 Championship ====
(key) (Races in bold indicate pole position) (Races in italics indicate fastest lap)

Year	Team	1	2	3	4	5	6	7	8	9	10	11	12	13	14	15	16	17	18	Position	Points
2024	TJ Speed Motorsports	STP; 1	STP; 2	LOU; 1	LOU; 2	LOU; 3	IMS; 1	IMS; 2	IMS; 3	IRP	ROA; 1; 13	ROA; 2; 9	ROA; 3; 12	MOH; 1; 15	MOH; 2; 12	TOR; 1; 9	TOR; 2; 9	POR; 1; 10	POR; 2; 11	18th	90
2025	Turn 3 Motorsport	STP; 1; 6	STP; 2; 16	LOU; 1; 13	LOU; 2; 16	LOU; 3; 8	IMS; 1; 9	IMS; 2; 16	IMS; 3; 2	IRP; 12	ROA; 1; 13	ROA; 2; 11	ROA; 3; 10	MOH; 1; 8	MOH; 2; 9	TOR; 1; 11	TOR; 2; 8	POR; 1; 11	POR; 2; 13	9th	197

* Season still in progress.
