= Jordan Missig =

American racing driver (born 1998)

- Nationality: (United States) American
- Born: March 22, 1998 (age 28); Joliet, Illinois, United States

Indy NXT career
- Debut season: 2024
- Current team: Abel Motorsports
- Car number: 48
- Starts: 19
- Championships: 0
- Wins: 0
- Podiums: 0
- Poles: 0
- Fastest laps: 1
- Best finish: 9th in 2025

Previous series
- 2021–23: Indy Pro 2000 Championship

Jordan Missig (born March 22, 1998) is an American racing driver who currently races for Abel Motorsports in the Indy NXT Series.

== Career ==
=== Karting ===
Missig competed in the Briggs & Stratton LO206 powered Margay Ignite Series. He achieved four Ignite Senior Championships at Kart Circuit Autobahn along with a regional Ignite Challenge Series championship in 2018.

=== Sports cars ===
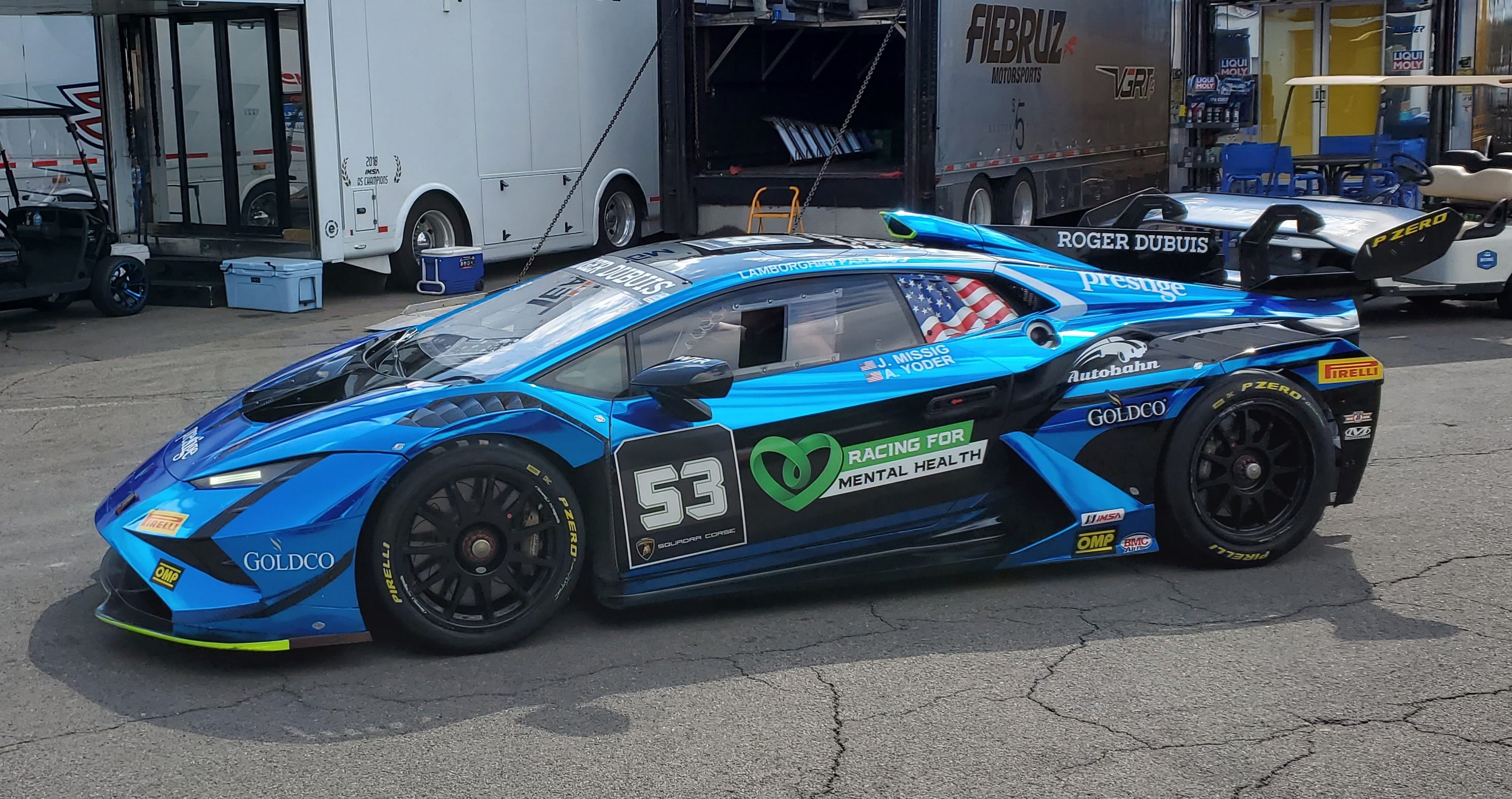
Missig's Lamborghini Huracán Super Trofeo at Watkins Glen in 2022.

Missig started his sports car racing career at Autobahn Country Club in 2017, competing in both the Spec Miata and Radical Sports Car classes. Missig was able to achieve multiple club wins and championships in his early years before moving into the Radical Cup North America in 2018. In 2019, he finished second in the Radical Cup North America with seven wins.

In 2024, Missig raced in the Radical Cup North America Series and won the Championship for Graham Rahal Performance (GRP) With nine wins and sixteen podium finishes.

In 2021, Missig made his sports car return with Wayne Taylor Racing by competing in the Lamborghini Super Trofeo North America. He finished fourth in the Pro-Am-class standings after taking two class-wins.

=== Formula Regional Americas ===
In 2020, Missig made his debut in single-seater racing by competing in the Formula Regional Americas Championship with Newman Wachs Racing. His best race result of the season was a third-place finish at Virginia International Raceway. He finished the season in tenth.

In 2021, Missig continued to compete in the series with Newman Wachs Racing. He took his maiden race win in the series at Virginia International Raceway and finished the season in fifth.

=== Indy Pro 2000 Championship ===
In 2021, Missig joined Pabst Racing to compete in the season of the Indy Pro 2000 Championship at Mid-Ohio Sports Car Course. He finished his debut race in tenth.

In 2022, Missig stayed with Pabst Racing to compete in the full Indy Pro 2000 Championship. He finished the season in eleventh.

In 2023, Missig competed for Pabst Racing in the renamed USF Pro 2000 Championship.

=== Indy NXT ===
==== 2024 ====
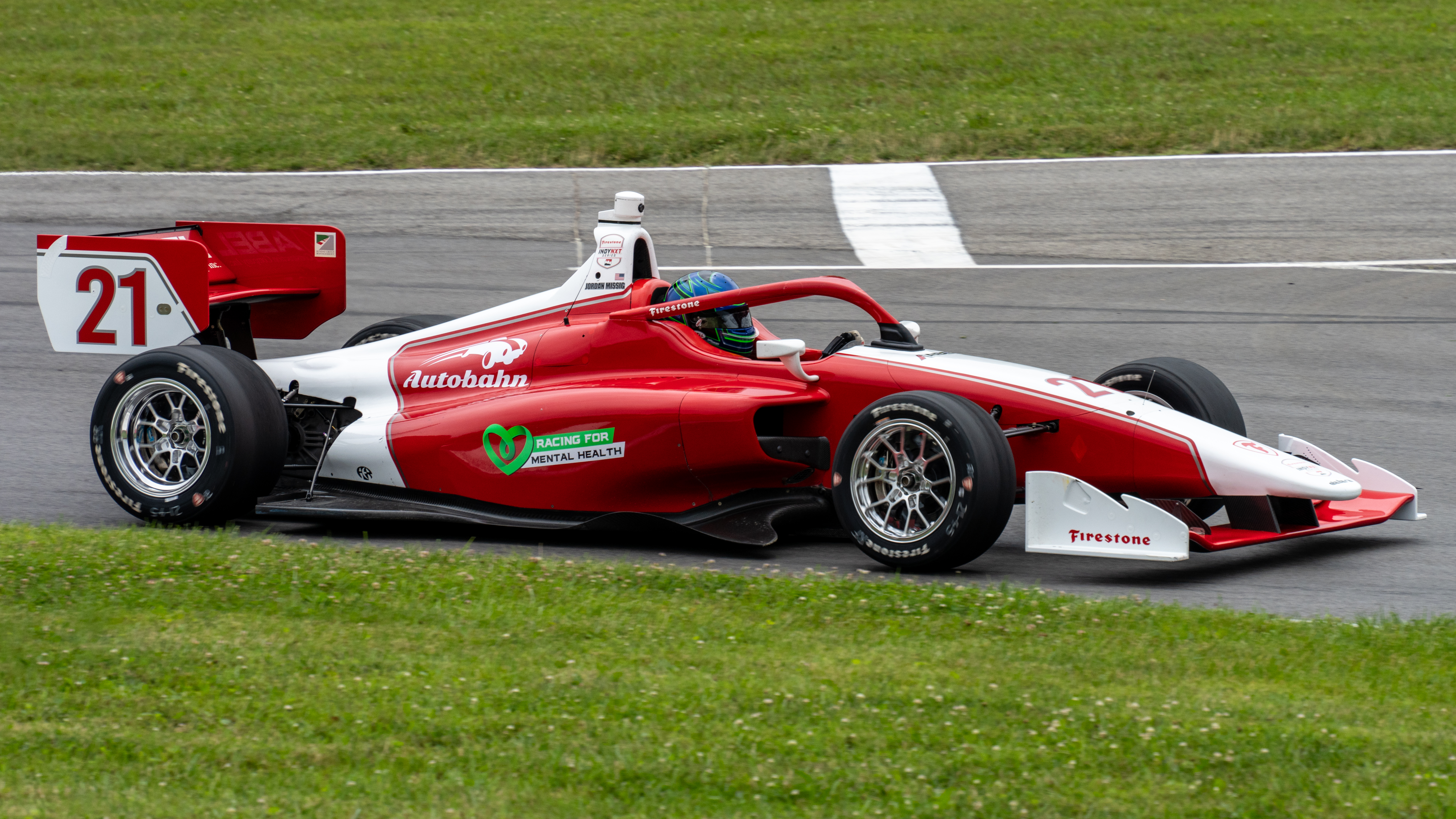
Missig in his 2024 Indy NXT car

In May 2024, it was announced that Missig would make his debut in the Indy NXT championship at the Indianapolis round for Abel Motorsports, replacing Josh Mason.

==== 2025 ====
In 2025, Missig earned a full-time Indy NXT seat with Abel Motorsports.

==== 2026 ====
Missig remained with Abel Motorsports for the 2026 season. However, following a crash at the Nashville Superspeedway, it was announced that Missig would not contest the final four races of the season with the team.

== Racing record ==
=== Career summary ===
Season	Series	Team	Races	Wins	Poles	F/Laps	Podiums	Points	Position
2018	Radical Cup North America	Team Stradale	5	0	0	?	2	?	N/A
2019	Radical Cup North America	Team Stradale	18	7	10	?	13	?	**2nd**
2020	Formula Regional Americas Championship	Newman Wachs Racing	16	0	0	0	1	54	10th
2021	Formula Regional Americas Championship	Newman Wachs Racing	18	1	0	1	6	142	5th
2021	Indy Pro 2000 Championship	Pabst Racing	2	0	0	0	0	20	20th
2021	Lamborghini Super Trofeo North America - Pro-Am	Wayne Taylor Racing	8	2	0	1	4	64	4th
2022	Indy Pro 2000 Championship	Pabst Racing	17	0	0	0	0	199	11th
2022	Lamborghini Super Trofeo North America - Pro	Wayne Taylor Racing	10	0	0	0	0	47	9th
2023	USF Pro 2000 Championship	Pabst Racing	18	0	0	1	2	179	11th
2024	Indy NXT	Abel Motorsports	5	0	0	0	0	74	22nd
2025	Indy NXT	Abel Motorsports	14	0	0	1	0	273	9th
2026	Indy NXT	Abel Motorsports	13	0	0	0	0	216	19th

=== Formula Regional Americas Championship results ===
(key) (Races in bold indicate pole position) (Races in italics indicate fastest lap) (Races with ^{L} indicate a race lap led) (Races with * indicate most race laps led)

Year	Team	1	2	3	4	5	6	7	8	9	10	11	12	13	14	15	16	17	18	Rank	Points
2020	Newman Wachs Racing	MOH; 1; 7	MOH; 2; 13	VIR; 1; 3	VIR; 2; 14	VIR; 3; 8	BAR; 1; 6	BAR; 2; 11	BAR; 3; 6	SEB; 1 NC	SEB; 2 Ret	SEB; 3 DNS	HMS; 1; 10	HMS; 2; 8	HMS; 3; 10	COA; 1; 11	COA; 2; 8	COA; 3 Ret		10th	54
2021	Newman Wachs Racing	ATL; 1; 4	ATL; 2; 3	ATL; 3; 2	ROA; 1; 3	ROA; 2 Ret	ROA; 3 DNS	MOH; 1; 3	MOH; 2 Ret	MOH; 3; 10	BRA; 1; 4	BRA; 2 DNS	BRA; 3; 8	VIR; 1; 1	VIR; 2; 3	VIR; 3 Ret	COA; 1; 5	COA; 2 NC	COA; 3; 13	5th	142

=== American open–wheel racing results ===
==== Indy/USF Pro 2000 ====
(key) (Races in bold indicate pole position) (Races in italics indicate fastest lap) (Races with ^{L} indicate a race lap led) (Races with * indicate most race laps led)

Year	Team	1	2	3	4	5	6	7	8	9	10	11	12	13	14	15	16	17	18	Rank	Points
2021	Pabst Racing	ALA; 1	ALA; 2	STP; 1	STP; 2	IMS; 1	IMS; 2	IMS; 3	IRP	ROA; 1	ROA; 2	MOH1; 1	MOH1; 2	GMP	NJMP; 1	NJMP; 2	NJMP; 3	MOH2; 1; 10	MOH2; 2; 12	20th	20
2022	Pabst Racing	STP; 1; 12	STP; 2; 8	ALA; 1; 9	ALA; 2; 14	IMS; 1; 7	IMS; 2; 16	IMS; 3; 11	IRP; 9	ROA; 1; 9	ROA; 2; 15	MOH; 1; 11	MOH; 2; 10	TOR; 1; 7	TOR; 2; 9	GMP; DNS	POR; 1; 6	POR; 2; 7	POR; 3; 9	11th	199
2023	Pabst Racing	STP; 1; 20	STP; 2; 7	SEB; 1; 5	SEB; 2; 19	IMS; 1; 19	IMS; 2; 8	IRP; 8	ROA; 1; 3	ROA; 2; 17	MOH; 1; 20	MOH; 2; 18	TOR; 1; 10	TOR; 2; 3	COA; 1; 19	COA; 2; 12	POR; 1; 8	POR; 2; 13	POR; 3; 7	11th	179

==== Indy NXT ====
(key) (Races in bold indicate pole position) (Races in italics indicate fastest lap) (Races with ^{L} indicate a race lap led) (Races with * indicate most race laps led)

Year	Team	1	2	3	4	5	6	7	8	9	10	11	12	13	14	15	16	17	Rank	Points
2024	Abel Motorsports	STP	BAR	IMS; 18	IMS; 13	DET	ROA; 20	LAG	LAG	MOH; 17	IOW	GTW; 9	POR	MIL	NSH				22nd	74
2025	Abel Motorsports	STP; 6	BAR; 12	IMS; 11	IMS; 17	DET; 12	GMP; 11	RDA; 19	MOH; 7	IOW; 8	LAG; 18	LAG; 10	POR; 8	MIL; 13	NSH; 8				9th	273
2026	Abel Motorsports	STP; 14	ARL; 10	BAR; 6	BAR; 6	IMS; 11	IMS; 16	DET; 15	GAT; 10	ROA; 24	ROA; 16	MOH; 12	MOH; 20	NSS; 22	POR	MIL	LAG	LAG	19th	216
