= 2022 MotoAmerica Superstock 1000 Championship =

Record of 2022 Racing Season

The 2022 MotoAmerica Stock 1000 Championship season was the 8th season of the Stock 1000 class of motorcycle racing within the MotoAmerica series.

== Calendar and results ==
Round	Circuit	Date	Race 1 Winner	Race 2 Winner
	(Florida) Daytona International Speedway	March 10–12	Non-championship event	Non-championship event
1	(Georgia (U.S. state)) Road Atlanta	April 22–24	(United States) Corey Alexander	No event held
2	Virginia	May 20–22	(United States) Hayden Gillim	(United States) Hayden Gillim
3	(Wisconsin) Road America	June 3–5	(United States) Corey Alexander	No event held
4	(Washington (state)) The Ridge	June 24–26	(United States) Corey Alexander	(United States) Corey Alexander
5	(California) Monterey	July 8–10	(United States) Corey Alexander	No event held
6	(Minnesota) Brainerd	July 29–31	(United States) Corey Alexander	No event held
7	(Pennsylvania) Pittsburgh	August 19–21	(United States) Hayden Gillim	(United States) Corey Alexander
8	New Jersey	September 9–11	(United States) Hayden Gillim	No event held
9	Alabama	September 23–25	(United States) Hayden Gillim	No event held

== Teams and riders ==
2022 Entry List
Team	Constructor	No.	Rider	Rounds
3D Motorsports	Yamaha	72	(United Kingdom) Steven Shakespeare	3, 4, 7, 8, 9
Altus Motorsport	Suzuki	96	(United States) Brandon Paasch	All
Apex Assassins	Kawasaki	521	(United States) Anthony Norton	4, 5
Apex Assassins	Kawasaki	126	(United States) Tyler Bengford	5
Apex Assassins	Suzuki	146	(United States) William Russell	5
Buck Wild Racing	Suzuki	971	(United States) Corey Jones	1
Burke Racing	Yamaha	87	(United States) Ryan Burke	1, 4, 5, 6, 7, 8, 9
Centaur Racing/Epic Wraps/Crown Rally	Yamaha	970	(United States) Scott Masterton	6
Champ School BPR Yamaha	Yamaha	70	(United States) Bryce Prince	5
CWMoto Racing	Yamaha	52	(United States) Sean Thomas	2
CWMoto Racing	Yamaha	79	(United States) Eziah Davis	4, 8, 9
Cycle World/Octane/Chuckwalla Racing	Suzuki	14	(United States) Andrew Lee	6, 7, 8, 9
Cycle World/Octane/Chuckwalla Racing	Suzuki	55	(United States) Michael Gilbert	1, 2, 3, 4, 9
DAM Fast Racing	Kawasaki	865	(United States) Jonathan McCroskey	2
Dirty T Racing	Yamaha	163	(United States) Dan Dickerman	1, 3, 7
Disrupt Racing	Suzuki	69	(United States) Hayden Gillim	All
Edge Racing	Honda	92	(United States) Jason Waters	1, 2, 3, 7, 8, 9
Edge Racing	Honda	93	(United States) Luie Zendejas	1, 2, 3
Edge Racing	Kawasaki	990	(United States) Jesse Ruehling	1, 2
ESBK	Yamaha	152	(United States) Jason Lee	7, 9
EZ Racing	Kawasaki	27	(Mexico) Edgar Zaragoza	2, 3
EZ Racing	Yamaha	59	(Mexico) Ivan Munoz	3, 8
Farrell Performance	Kawasaki	86	(United States) Jason Farrell	3
Flo4Law Racing	Yamaha	77	(United States) Bobby Davies	5, 9
Galactic Empire Race Team	Kawasaki	283	(United States) Justin Fite	5
HONOS Racing	BMW	277	(Mexico) Jorge Ehrenstein	3, 5
Hunter Dunham Racing	Yamaha	17	(United States) Hunter Dunham	All
Icarus Racing	Yamaha	114	(United States) PR Stafki	6
Impact Racing	Yamaha	98	(United States) Jeremy Simmons	1, 2, 3, 4, 6, 7, 8, 9
Innovative Motorsport	Kawasaki	124	(United States) Scott Briody	2, 3, 4, 5
Innovative Motorsport	Kawasaki	518	(Panama) Erasmo Pinilla	1, 3, 4, 5, 7
JLC Concrete/KTM/DiBrino Racing	Kawasaki	62	(United States) Andy DiBrino	1, 2, 3, 4, 5, 8
John Dunham Racing	Yamaha	816	(United States) John Dunham	1, 2
Jones Honda	Honda	22	(United States) Ashton Yates	1
Josh Gerardot Racing	Kawasaki	84	(United States) Josh Gerardot	7, 9
Lambert MotorSports	Kawasaki	28	(United States) David Lambert	2, 4, 5
Luie Zendejas Racing	BMW	48	(United States) Joseph Giannotto	9
Markbilt Racebikes/Rodio Racing	Yamaha	516	(United States) Anthony Mazziotto	8
Mesa37 Racing	Kawasaki	37	(United States) Stefano Mesa	2, 3, 7, 9
Motorsport Exotica Orange Cat BST Racing	BMW	16	(United States) Ezra Beaubier	All
N2 Racing/BobbHeadMoto	Yamaha	35	(El Salvador) Ermerson Amaya	7
N2/Escape/Crosslin Racing	Yamaha	298	(United States) Ned Brown	2
Nielsen Racing	Kawasaki	44	(United States) Justin Miest	3, 6
Nieves Racing	Kawasaki	192	(United States) Alejandro Nieves Jr	9
PDR Motorsports	Kawasaki	41	(Uruguay) Maximiliano Gerardo	1, 2, 3
Ready To Ride LLC	Kawasaki	13	(United States) Ryne Snooks	2, 7
Real Beal Racing	Ducati	317	(United States) Scott Beal	2
Reale Racing	Suzuki	517	(United States) Anthony Reale	9
Red Lobo Racing	Kawasaki	20	(Mexico) Manuel Segura	5, 6, 7, 8, 9
Redline-Moto	Yamaha	18	(United States) Zachary Butler	1, 2, 3, 5, 6, 7, 8, 9
Redline-Moto	Yamaha	43	(United States) Michael Butler	1, 2, 3, 5, 6, 7, 8
Redline-Moto	Kawasaki	824	(United States) Robert Loose Jr	2, 3
S2G/Adopt A Pet	BMW	177	(United States) Dustin Walbon	2, 4, 5, 7, 9
SDR	BMW	951	(United States) David Thomas	5
Squids 2 Grids Racing	BMW	164	(United States) Cody Cochran	1, 2, 3, 4, 5, 7, 8, 9
SVM Racing Division	Kawasaki	823	(United States) Roger D Ealy Jr	7
Synergy Audio Video	BMW	74	(United States) Aaron Risinger	3
Taylor Knapp Racing	BMW	114	(United States) Taylor Knapp	9
Team Germany - TSE	BMW	119	(Germany) Stefan Dolipski	9
Team Posse	Yamaha	40	(United States) Dallas Sherman Jr	1, 2, 3, 5, 9
Team Posse/Aerojwalk	Ducati	15	(United States) Jeremiah Walker	2, 9
Tecfil Racing	BMW	94	(Brazil) Danilo Lewis	All
Tom Wood Powersports	BMW	21	(United States) Nolan Lamkin	2, 3, 4, 5, 6, 7, 8, 9
Top Pro Motorsports	BMW	103	(United States) Alex Arango	1, 2, 9
Trackstar Racing	Kawasaki	793	(United States) Ryan Richardson	7
Triple M	Suzuki	42	(United States) Jeremy Coffey	All
TSS	Honda	800	(United States) Trevor Watson	9
Turn One Racing	Yamaha	441	(United States) Steve Olson	3, 9
Tytlers Cycle/RideHVMC Racing	BMW	23	(United States) Corey Alexander	1, 3, 4, 5, 6, 7, 8, 9
Tytlers Cycle/RideHVMC Racing	BMW	10	(United States) Travis Wyman	All
Tytlers Cycle/RideHVMC Racing	BMW	90	(United States) Zachary Schumacher	All
VisionWheel/DiscountTire/KWS	Honda	99	(United States) Geoff May	All
Wawa Racing Team	BMW	29	(United States) Jack Bakken	5
Wawa Racing Team	BMW	161	(Israel) Sahar Zvik	5
Wawa Racing Team	BMW	153	(United States) Terry Heard	5

== Championship standings ==
Scoring system

Points are awarded to the top fifteen finishers. A rider has to finish the race to earn points.

Position	1st	2nd	3rd	4th	5th	6th	7th	8th	9th	10th	11th	12th	13th	14th	15th
Points	25	20	16	13	11	10	9	8	7	6	5	4	3	2	1

Pos	Rider	Bike	RAT (Georgia (U.S. state))	VIR (Virginia)		RAM (Wisconsin)	RID (Washington (state))		MON (California)	BRA (Minnesota)	PIT (Pennsylvania)		NJE (New Jersey)	ALA (Alabama)	Pts
Pos	Rider	Bike	R1	R1	R2	R1	R1	R2	R1	R1	R1	R2	R1	R1	Pts
1	(United States) Corey Alexander	BMW	1			1	1	1	1	1	10	1	5	Ret	192
2	(United States) Hayden Gillim	Suzuki	4	1	1	Ret	3	4	3	7	1	Ret	1	1	192
3	(United States) Travis Wyman	BMW	3	3	11	2	4	2	4	Ret	4	2	2	Ret	156
4	(United States) Brandon Paasch	Suzuki	8	8	6	Ret	6	6	6	2	3	3	3	4	137
5	(United States) Geoff May	Honda	Ret	2	2	3	10		Ret	8	5	DNS	6	2	111
6	(United States) Andy DiBrino	Kawasaki	6	7	5	5	2	3	7				4		86
7	(United States) Stefano Mesa	Kawasaki		5	4	4					6	5		5	82
8	(United States) Hunter Dunham	Yamaha	10	13	7	10	8	9	11	9	9	8	9	8	81
9	(United States) Ezra Beaubier	BMW	5	6	Ret	Ret	Ret	5	5	5	8	7	8	Ret	79
10	(Brazil) Danilo Lewis	BMW	12	9	8	11	7	7	8	4	26	6	12	28	77
11	(United States) Andrew Lee	Suzuki								3	2	4	Ret	3	65
12	(United States) Jeremy Coffey	Suzuki	11	10	10	12	DNS	Ret	9	6	7		10	10	59
13	(United States) Nolan Lamkin	BMW		11	9	9	9		10	10	Ret	DNS	14	7	49
14	(Uruguay) Maximiliano Gerardo	Kawasaki	7	4	3	6									48
15	(United States) Michael Gilbert	Suzuki	2	Ret	Ret	7	5							17	40
16	(United States) Ryan Burke	Yamaha	23				12	10	14	11	11	11	Ret	14	29
17	(United States) Eziah Davis	Yamaha					11	8					11	9	25
18	(United States) Zachary Butler	Yamaha	13	15	14	13			12	15	15	12	17	13	22
19	(United States) Bryce Prince	Yamaha							2						20
20	(United States) Jason Waters	Honda	15	Ret	Ret	19					12	9	13	11	20
21	(United States) Taylor Knapp	BMW												6	10
22	(United States) Anthony Mazziotto	Yamaha											7		9
23	(El Salvador) Ermerson Amaya	Yamaha									13	10			9
24	(United States) Jason Farrell	Kawasaki				8									8
25	(United States) Ashton Yates	Honda	9												7
26	(United States) John Dunham	Yamaha	22	12	13										7
27	(United States) Dustin Walbon	BMW		25	24		13	12	20		Ret	DNS		25	7
28	(United States) Ned Brown	Yamaha		14	12										6
29	(United States) Anthony Norton	Kawasaki					DNS	11	15						6
30	(United States) Zachary Schumacher	BMW	14	19	18	14	15	15	28	16	18	17	18	16	6
31	(United States) Justin Miest	Kawasaki				15				12					5
32	(Mexico) Manuel Segura	Kawasaki							23	13	14	16	16	18	5
33	(United States) Anthony Reale	Suzuki												12	4
34	(United States) Dan Dickerman	Yamaha	19			17					17	13			3
35	(United States) Jack Bakken	BMW							13						3
36	(United States) Cody Cochran	BMW	25	24	26	29	17	13	16		24	19	21	20	3
37	(United Kingdom) Steven Shakespeare	Yamaha				27	16	14			Ret	DNS	22	Ret	2
38	(United States) Ryne Snooks	Kawasaki		20	20						20	14			2
39	(United States) PR Stafki	Yamaha								14					2
40	(United States) Scott Briody	Kawasaki		23	22	25	14		27						2
41	(United States) Steve Olson	Yamaha				21								15	1
42	(United States) Michael Butler	Yamaha	27	22	23	22			30	18	19	15	20		1
43	(United States) Luie Zendejas	Honda	17	Ret	15	18									1
44	(United States) Jeremy Simmons	Yamaha	18	18	16	20	18			17	16	18	15	19	1
45	(Germany) Stefan Dolipski	BMW												Ret	0
46	(United States) Jason Lee	Yamaha									25	Ret		Ret	0
47	(United States) Alex Arango	BMW	16	Ret	DNS									Ret	0
48	(United States) Joseph Giannotto	BMW												Ret	0
49	(Israel) Sahar Zvik	BMW							Ret						0
50	(United States) David Lambert	Kawasaki		26	25		19	16	Ret						0
51	(Mexico) Edgar Zaragoza	Kawasaki		DNS	Ret	DNS									0
52	(United States) Jonathan McCroskey	Kawasaki		DNS	Ret										0
53	(United States) Jesse Ruehling	Kawasaki	20	DNS											0
54	(United States) Sean Thomas	Yamaha		DNS											0
55	(United States) Aaron Risinger	BMW				16									0
56	(United States) William Russell	Suzuki							17						0
57	(United States) Tyler Bengford	Kawasaki							18						0
58	(Mexico) Ivan Munoz	Yamaha				26							19		0
59	(United States) Scott Masterton	Yamaha								19					0
60	(United States) Scott Beal	Ducati		16	19										0
61	(United States) Ryan Richardson	Kawasaki									22	20			0
62	(United States) Jeremiah Walker	Ducati		21	21									21	0
63	(Panama) Erasmo Pinilla	Kawasaki	26			28	Ret		24		21	21			0
64	(United States) Terry Heard	BMW							21						0
65	(United States) Corey Jones	Suzuki	21												0
66	(United States) Alejandro Nieves Jr	Kawasaki												22	0
67	(United States) Roger D Ealy Jr	Kawasaki									Ret	22			0
68	(Mexico) Jorge Ehrenstein	BMW				23			22						0
69	(United States) Trevor Watson	Honda												23	0
70	(United States) Dallas Sherman Jr	Yamaha	24	17	17	24			19					24	0
71	(United States) Bobby Davies	Yamaha							25					26	0
72	(United States) David Thomas	BMW							26						0
73	(United States) Josh Gerardot	Kawasaki									23	Ret		27	0
74	(United States) Justin Fite	Kawasaki							29						0
75	(United States) Robert Loose Jr	Kawasaki		27	27	29									0
Pos	Rider	Bike	RAT (Georgia (U.S. state))	VIR (Virginia)		RAM (Wisconsin)	RID (Washington (state))		MON (California)	BRA (Minnesota)	PIT (Pennsylvania)		NJE (New Jersey)	ALA (Alabama)	Pts
