= 2021 Formula 4 United States Championship =

Motor racing competition

Seasons
- ← 2020 2022 →

The 2021 Formula 4 United States Championship season was the sixth season of the Formula 4 United States Championship, a motor racing series regulated according to FIA Formula 4 regulations and sanctioned by SCCA Pro Racing, the professional racing division of the Sports Car Club of America.

== Teams and drivers ==
Team	No.	Driver	Rounds
(United States) Jensen Global Advisors	1	(United States) Oscar Haffar	All
(United States) Jensen Global Advisors	2	(United States) Jake Bonilla	All
(United States) Jensen Global Advisors	9	(United States) Kerong Li	5–6
(United States) Jensen Global Advisors	12	(United States) Maximillian Parker	6
(United States) Jay Howard Driver Development	3	(United States) Chase Hyland	3–6
(United States) Jay Howard Driver Development	4	(United States) Seth Foley	All
(United States) Jay Howard Driver Development	5	(United States) Matthew Christensen	All
(United States) Jay Howard Driver Development	6	(United States) Bijoy Garg	2–4, 6
(United States) Jay Howard Driver Development	7	(United States) Joe Ostholthoff	1–3
(United States) Jay Howard Driver Development	7	(United States) Alexander Koreiba	6
(United States) Jay Howard Driver Development	10	(Japan) Juju Noda	1
(United States) Jay Howard Driver Development	10	(United States) Zoey Edenholm	6
(United States) Future Star Racing	8	(United States) Chloe Chambers	1–5
(United States) Velocity Racing Development	11	(United States) Nick Persing	1–2
(United States) Velocity Racing Development	22	(Canada) Nicholas Christodoulou	All
(United States) Velocity Racing Development	29	(United States) Erik Evans	5–6
(United States) Velocity Racing Development	77	(United States) Jason Alder	All
(United States) Velocity Racing Development	03	(United States) Hayden Bowlsbey	5–6
(United States) DEForce Racing	16	(United States) Chara Mansur	6
(United States) DEForce Racing	17	(Mexico) José Andrés Martínez	1–2, 5–6
(United States) DEForce Racing	17	(United States) Maxwell Jamieson	4
(United States) DEForce Racing	18	(United States) Maxwell Jamieson	5–6
(United States) DEForce Racing	19	(Mexico) Noel León	All
(United States) Crosslink/Kiwi Motorsport	20	(Sweden) Viktor Andersson	All
(United States) Crosslink/Kiwi Motorsport	25	(United States) Spencer Bucknum	1
(United States) Crosslink/Kiwi Motorsport	25	(United States) Joseph Daniele	2–6
(United States) Crosslink/Kiwi Motorsport	33	(United States) Chase Gardner	5–6
(United States) Crosslink/Kiwi Motorsport	39	(United States) Bryson Morris	4–6
(United States) Crosslink/Kiwi Motorsport	64	(United States) Dylan Hajicek	6
(United States) Crosslink/Kiwi Motorsport	66	(United States) Ryan Shehan	All
(United States) Crosslink/Kiwi Motorsport	76	(Brazil) Gabriel Fonseca	All
(United States) Crosslink/Kiwi Motorsport	91	(United States) Cooper Becklin	1
(United States) Crosslink/Kiwi Motorsport	99	(United Kingdom) Emily Linscott	1–5
(United States) Crosslink/Kiwi Motorsport	03	(United States) Hayden Bowlsbey	4
(United States) Crosslink/Kiwi Motorsport	07	(United States) Arias Deukmedjian	1–3
(United States) Gonella Racing	23	(Mexico) Arturo Flores	All
(United States) Gonella Racing	26	(Canada) Mac Clark	All
(United States) Gonella Racing	31	(United States) Christian Weir	5–6
(United States) Alliance Racing	28	(United States) Will Edwards	1–3, 5–6
(United States) Alliance Racing	03	(United States) Hayden Bowlsbey	1–3
(United States) TR Racing	32	(United States) Trevor Russell	1–3, 6
(United States) Gardner Racing	33	(United States) Chase Gardner	1, 3–4
ICAR Canada Racing Team	36	(Canada) Justin Arseneau	All
ICAR Canada Racing Team	98	(Canada) Louka St-Jean	All
(United States) DC Autosport	71	(Bolivia) Rodrigo Gutiérrez	1–4, 6
(United States) Momentum Motorsports	74	(United States) Lucas Mann (Note: Lucas Mann is an American-Canadian driver who entered under the American flag.)	1–4

== Race calendar ==
The 2021 calendar was announced on 5 November 2020. The series held a pre-season test at Virginia International Raceway as well as a Winter Cup at Homestead–Miami Speedway in February and March. Each round is set to feature three races. Later on, the opening rounds at Sonoma Raceway and Laguna Seca were replaced by competitions at Road Atlanta and Road America. The final round was moved forward by two weeks and supported United States Grand Prix.

Round		Circuit	Date	Pole position	Fastest lap	Winning driver	Winning team	Supporting
1	R1	Road Atlanta, Braselton	27 March	(Mexico) Noel León	(United States) Jason Alder	(United States) Jason Alder	(United States) Velocity Racing Development	Formula Regional Americas Championship; Trans-Am Series; SVRA; International GT
1	R2	Road Atlanta, Braselton	27 March		(Mexico) Noel León	(United States) Jason Alder	(United States) Velocity Racing Development	Formula Regional Americas Championship; Trans-Am Series; SVRA; International GT
1	R3	Road Atlanta, Braselton	28 March		(United States) Jason Alder	(Mexico) Noel León	(United States) DEForce Racing	Formula Regional Americas Championship; Trans-Am Series; SVRA; International GT
2	R1	Road America, Elkhart Lake	16 May	(Canada) Mac Clark	(Canada) Mac Clark	(Canada) Mac Clark	(United States) Gonella Racing	Formula Regional Americas Championship; SVRA; International GT
2	R2	Road America, Elkhart Lake	16 May	(Canada) Mac Clark (Note: The drivers did not complete a full green lap in Race 1, thus it was not counted toward points. Grid for Race 1, including penalties after that race, was re-used for Race 2.)	(United States) Bijoy Garg	(Canada) Mac Clark	(United States) Gonella Racing	Formula Regional Americas Championship; SVRA; International GT
2	R3	Road America, Elkhart Lake	17 May		(United States) Bijoy Garg	(Canada) Nicholas Christodoulou	(United States) Velocity Racing Development	Formula Regional Americas Championship; SVRA; International GT
3	R1	Mid-Ohio Sports Car Course, Lexington	26 June	(Mexico) Noel León (Note: Due to the weather conditions, the qualifying were cancelled. The grid was set by the championship standings.)	(United States) Arias Deukmedjian	(Canada) Mac Clark (Note: Noel León and Arias Deukmedjian finished first and second but both were penalized. Mac Clark inherited the win.)	(United States) DEForce Racing	Formula Regional Americas Championship; Trans-Am Series; SVRA; International GT
3	R2	Mid-Ohio Sports Car Course, Lexington	27 June		(Bolivia) Rodrigo Gutiérrez	(Mexico) Noel León	(United States) DEForce Racing	Formula Regional Americas Championship; Trans-Am Series; SVRA; International GT
3	R3	Mid-Ohio Sports Car Course, Lexington	27 June		(Canada) Mac Clark	(Canada) Mac Clark	(United States) Gonella Racing	Formula Regional Americas Championship; Trans-Am Series; SVRA; International GT
4	R1	Brainerd International Raceway, Brainerd	17 July	(Canada) Nicholas Christodoulou	(Canada) Nicholas Christodoulou	(Canada) Nicholas Christodoulou	(United States) Velocity Racing Development	Formula Regional Americas Championship; Trans-Am Series; SVRA
4	R2	Brainerd International Raceway, Brainerd	17 July		(United States) Jason Alder	(Canada) Mac Clark	(United States) Gonella Racing	Formula Regional Americas Championship; Trans-Am Series; SVRA
4	R3	Brainerd International Raceway, Brainerd	18 July		(Canada) Nicholas Christodoulou	(United States) Bryson Morris	(United States) Crosslink/Kiwi Motorsports	Formula Regional Americas Championship; Trans-Am Series; SVRA
5	R1	Virginia International Raceway, Alton	25 September	(Mexico) Noel León	(Canada) Louka St-Jean	(United States) Jason Alder	(United States) Velocity Racing Development	Formula Regional Americas Championship; Trans-Am Series; SVRA; International GT
5	R2	Virginia International Raceway, Alton	25 September		(United States) Ryan Shehan	(Canada) Mac Clark	(United States) Gonella Racing	Formula Regional Americas Championship; Trans-Am Series; SVRA; International GT
5	R3	Virginia International Raceway, Alton	26 September		(United States) Jason Alder	(United States) Jason Alder	(United States) Velocity Racing Development	Formula Regional Americas Championship; Trans-Am Series; SVRA; International GT
6	R1	Circuit of the Americas, Austin	23 October	(Mexico) Noel León (Note: Nicholas Christodoulou was the fastest in the qualifying but was penalized to start from the pitlane. León inherited the pole.)	(Canada) Nicholas Christodoulou	(United States) Jason Alder	(United States) Velocity Racing Development	Formula One World Championship
6	R2	Circuit of the Americas, Austin	24 October		(Canada) Nicholas Christodoulou	(Canada) Nicholas Christodoulou	(United States) Velocity Racing Development	Formula One World Championship

== Championship standings ==
Points were awarded as follows:

Position	**1st**	**2nd**	**3rd**	**4th**	**5th**	**6th**	**7th**	**8th**	**9th**	**10th**
Points	25	18	15	12	10	8	6	4	2	1

=== Drivers' standings ===
Pos	Driver	ATL			ROA			MOH			BRA			VIR			COA		Pts
Pos	Driver	R1	R2	R3	R1 (Note: The drivers did not complete a full green lap in Race 1, thus it was not counted toward points. Grid for Race 1, including penalties after that race, was re-used for Race 2.)	R2 (Note: Half points were awarded for Race 2 as the leader completed more than two laps but less than 75% of the original race time.)	R3	R1	R2	R3	R1 (Note: The drivers did not complete a full green lap in Race 1, thus it was not counted toward points.)	R2	R3	R1	R2	R3	R1	R2	Pts
1	(Mexico) Noel León	**2**	2	1	4	2	8	**5**	1	2	16	4	Ret	**8**	3	2	**2**	2	212
2	(Canada) Mac Clark	5	Ret	14	**1**	**1**	3	1	2	1	2	1	18	21	1	3	7	3	191.5
3	(United States) Jason Alder	1	1	2	Ret	Ret	EX	21	3	24	20	17	6	1	5	1	1	6	184
4	(Canada) Nicholas Christodoulou	3	6	4	3	3	1	Ret	EX	9	**1**	2	2	2	2	21†	6	1	174.5
5	(United States) Matthew Christensen	4	18	5	2	5	2	12	8	6	5	5	16	5	4	Ret	10	8	94
6	(United States) Bryson Morris										4	3	1	7	7	4	18	5	74
7	(Canada) Justin Arseneau	16	9	9	18	13	6	2	7	8	13	8	4	11	9	6	Ret	15	66
8	(United States) Bijoy Garg				Ret	4	7	3	6	4	Ret	6	7				9	10	64
9	(United States) Arias Deukmedjian	6	3	3	Ret	EX	4	8	EX	12									54
10	(Bolivia) Rodrigo Gutiérrez	9	4	6	6	17	12	Ret	10	3	12	7	14				11	14	44
11	(United States) Hayden Bowlsbey	14	Ret	10	14	12	19	7	4	7	14	11	3	Ret	Ret	13	Ret	12	40
12	(United States) Jake Bonilla	7	10	20	Ret	DNS	21	4	11	Ret	Ret	DNS	Ret	15	14	12	4	7	37
13	(United States) Christian Weir													3	Ret	7	3	Ret	36
14	(United States) Erik Evans													20	11	5	5	4	32
15	(Brazil) Gabriel Fonseca	10	7	7	8	8	9	6	18	14	6	NC	17	9	20	8	14	Ret	31
16	(Canada) Louka St-Jean	20	12	15	Ret	Ret	13	19	16	13	3	10	8	4	6	11	24	16	25
17	(United States) Chase Gardner	24	DNS	DNS				20	9	5	18	16	EX	14	8	20†	8	9	22
18	(United States) Lucas Mann	13	8	12	9	6	5	DNS	EX	20	10	13	21						18
19	(United States) Seth Foley	Ret	Ret	DNS	10	10	Ret	9	5	11	Ret	DNS	Ret	Ret	10	9	12	11	15.5
20	(Sweden) Viktor Andersson	12	Ret	17	11	7	10	11	12	10	19	12	9	6	13	17	16	28	15
21	(United States) Spencer Bucknum	8	5	Ret															14
22	(Mexico) Arturo Flores	19	11	16	20	19	16	15	19	17	Ret	DNS	5	12	24	14	15	17	10
23	(United Kingdom) Emily Linscott	15	15	8	19	15	Ret	14	20	19	Ret	14	12	16	17	15			4
24	(United States) Ryan Shehan	22	14	21	7	9	14	13	13	23	11	9	10	Ret	12	19†	13	13	4
25	(United States) Joseph Daniele				21	16	20	18	14	16	8	19	11	10	22	10	Ret	24	2
26	(United States) Chloe Chambers	17	Ret	11	15	Ret	11	10	22	26	7	Ret	20	17	16	18			1
27	(United States) Trevor Russell	DNS	DNS	13	5	11	Ret	17	Ret	25							17	Ret	0
28	(United States) Oscar Haffar	21	16	Ret	13	Ret	18	16	14	21	9	15	19	Ret	15	Ret	21	18	0
29	(United States) Cooper Becklin	11	Ret	DNS															0
30	(Mexico) José Andrés Martínez	Ret	DNS	18	12	18	15							18	18	16	Ret	22	0
31	(United States) Joe Ostholthoff	18	13	22	16	14	17	22	17	15									0
32	(United States) Will Edwards	23	17	19	17	20	Ret	DNS	21	18				13	23	Ret	Ret	DNS	0
33	(United States) Chase Hyland							NC	Ret	22	17	20	13				26	20	0
34	(United States) Maxwell Jamieson										15	18	15	Ret	19	22	19	27	0
35	(United States) Alexander Koreiba																20	19	0
36	(United States) Kerong Li													19	21	DNS	25	26	0
37	(United States) Chara Mansur																Ret	21	0
38	(United States) Dylan Hajicek																22	29	0
39	(United States) Zoey Edenholm																23	25	0
40	(United States) Maximillian Parker																27	23	0
–	(United States) Nick Persing	Ret	DNS	Ret	Ret	DNS	DNS												–
–	(Japan) Juju Noda	WD	WD	WD															–
Pos	Driver	R1	R2	R3	R1	R2	R3	R1	R2	R3	R1	R2	R3	R1	R2	R3	R1	R2	Pts
Pos	Driver	ATL			ROA			MOH			BRA			VIR			COA		Pts

Colour	Result
Gold	Winner
Silver	Second place
Bronze	Third place
Green	Points classification
Blue	Non-points classification
Blue	Non-classified finish (NC)
Purple	Retired, not classified (Ret)
Red	Did not qualify (DNQ)
Red	Did not pre-qualify (DNPQ)
Black	Disqualified (DSQ)
White	Did not start (DNS)
White	Withdrew (WD)
White	Race cancelled (C)
Blank	Did not practice (DNP)
Blank	Did not arrive (DNA)
Blank	Excluded (EX)

**Bold** – Pole
Italics – Fastest Lap
† — Did not finish, but classified

=== Teams' standings ===
Pos	Team	Pts
1	(United States) Velocity Racing Development	381.5
2	(United States) Gonella Racing	237.5
3	(United States) DEForce Racing	212
4	(United States) Crosslink/Kiwi Motorsports	184
5	(United States) Jay Howard Driver Development	169
6	ICAR Canada Racing Team	91
7	(United States) DC Autosport	44
8	(United States) Jensen Global Advisors	37
9	(United States) Alliance Racing	25
10	(United States) Momentum Motorsports	18
11	(United States) Gardner Racing	18
12	(United States) Future Star Racing	1
13	(United States) TR Racing	0
