= 2021 Trans-Am Series =

American sports car racing competition

The 2021 Trans-Am Series season was the 53rd running of the Trans-Am Series. The National Championship began on February 19 and will run for 14 rounds with one being only for TA2 cars and two only paying points for the Pro/Am Challenge. The Pro/Am Challenge was held for the first time to help SCCA competitors try out Trans Am. Points were given for two specific Pro/Am Challenge races and four other races of competitor's choice in either the national Trans Am Series or the Trans Am West Coast Championship. A separate West Coast Championship was also held with some rounds separate from the national series and some together.

== Entry list ==
=== National Championship ===
TA
| Car | No. | Driver | Class | Rounds |
|---|---|---|---|---|
| Cadillac CTS-V | 19 | (United States) Kerry Hitt | | 3, 5 |
| Chevrolet Camaro | 5 | (United States) Ken Thwaits | M | 2–3, 5 |
| Chevrolet Camaro | 8 | (United States) Tomy Drissi | | 1, 3, 5 |
| Chevrolet Camaro | 59 | (United States) Simon Gregg | | 1–3, 5 |
| Chevrolet Corvette | 23 | (United States) Amy Ruman | | 1, 3, 5 |
| Chevrolet Corvette | 30 | (United States) Richard Grant | M | 1, 3 |
| Chevrolet Corvette | 44 | (United States) A. J. Henriksen (Note: At the Charlotte round, A. J. Henriksen practiced in the No. 44, but Adam Andretti qualified and raced the car.) | | 2 |
| Chevrolet Corvette | 44 | (United States) Adam Andretti | | 2 |
| Chevrolet Corvette | 99 | (United States) Justin Marks | R | 1, 3, 5 |
| Dodge Challenger | 2 | (United States) Ken Thwaits | M | 1 |
| Dodge Challenger | 2 | (United States) Boris Said | | 3, 5 |
| Dodge Challenger | 9 | (United States) Jeff Hinkle | | 1–2 |
| Dodge Challenger | 43 | (United States) Adam Andretti | | 1, 3 |
| Ford Mustang | 3 | (Panama) Oscar Teran | | 1–3 |
| Ford Mustang | 20 | (United States) Chris Dyson | | 1, 3–5 |
| Ford Mustang | 21 | (United Kingdom) Humaid Al Masaood | | 3–5 |
| Ford Mustang | 57 | (United States) David Pintaric | | 1, 3, 5 |
| Ford Mustang | 98 | (United States) Ernie Francis Jr. | | 1, 3, 5 |
TA2
| Chevrolet Camaro | 1 | (United States) Mike Skeen | | 1, 3, 5 |
| Chevrolet Camaro | 3 | (United States) Adrian Wlostowski | | 1, 3, 5 |
| Chevrolet Camaro | 05 | (United States) Steven Lustig | | 1, 5 |
| Chevrolet Camaro | 7 | (United States) Michael Self | R | 1, 3, 5 |
| Chevrolet Camaro | 7 | (United States) Harrison Burton | | 2 |
| Chevrolet Camaro | 8 | (United States) Edward Sevadjian | | 1 |
| Chevrolet Camaro | 8 | (United States) Sam Mayer | | 2–5 |
| Chevrolet Camaro | 10 | (Canada) Misha Goikhberg | | 1, 3 |
| Chevrolet Camaro | 19 | (United States) Ricky Sanders | | 3 |
| Chevrolet Camaro | 20 | (United States) Blaise Csida | | 1 |
| Chevrolet Camaro | 28 | (United States) Connor Mosack | | 1–5 |
| Chevrolet Camaro | 38 | (United States) Edward Sevadjian | | 3, 5 |
| Chevrolet Camaro | 41 | (United States) John Cloud | M | 1–3 |
| Chevrolet Camaro | 57 | (United States) Maurice Hull | M | 1, 3 |
| Chevrolet Camaro | 57 | (United States) Brandon Jones | | 2 |
| Chevrolet Camaro | 92 | (United States) Scott Lagasse Jr. | | 1 |
| Chevrolet Camaro | 98 | (United States) Doug Winston | | 3 |
| Dodge Challenger | 01 | (United States) Rhett Barkau | R | 1, 3 |
| Dodge Challenger | 71 | (United States) Ken Thwaits | | 5 |
| Ford Mustang | 5 | (United States) Tyler Kicera | R | 1, 3, 5 |
| Ford Mustang | 9 | (United States) Keith Prociuk | | 1, 3, 5 |
| Ford Mustang | 12 | (United States) Alex Wright | | 2 |
| Ford Mustang | 12 | (United States) Drew Neubauer | | 5 |
| Ford Mustang | 14 | (United States) Matt Parent | | 3 |
| Ford Mustang | 15 | (United States) Ike Keeler | M/R | 1 |
| Ford Mustang | 16 | (United States) Jim Gallaugher | | 1, 3, 5 |
| Ford Mustang | 23 | (United States) Curt Vogt | | 1, 3 |
| Ford Mustang | 26 | (United States) Ty Young | R | 1, 5 |
| Ford Mustang | 26 | (United States) Ty Gibbs | | 2 |
| Ford Mustang | 32 | (United States) Barry Boes | | 3, 5 |
| Ford Mustang | 48 | (United States) Scott Borchetta | | 1–5 |
| Ford Mustang | 54 | (United States) Bruce Raymond | | 1–3 |
| Ford Mustang | 58 | (United States) Franklin Futrelle | R | 1, 3 |
| Ford Mustang | 60 | (United States) Tim Gray | M | 1 |
| Ford Mustang | 62 | (United States) Thomas Merrill | | 4 |
| Ford Mustang | 81 | (United States) Thomas Merrill | | 1, 3, 5 |
| Ford Mustang | 87 | (United States) Doug Peterson | M | 1, 3, 5 |
| Ford Mustang | 88 | (Brazil) Rafa Matos | | 1, 3, 5 |
| Ford Mustang | 92 | (United States) Scott Lagasse Jr. | | 3 |
| Ford Mustang | 97 | (United States) Tom Sheehan | | 1–3, 5 |
| Ford Mustang | 99 | (United States) Al Prieto | R | 1 |
| Ford Mustang | 99 | (United States) Corey Heim | | 2 |
SGT
| Aston Martin Vantage V8 GT4 | 22 | (United States) Steven Davison | | 1, 3 |
| Audi R8 | 04 | (United States) Natalie Decker | | 2 |
| BMW M4 GT4 | 24 | (United States) Mark Brummond | | 2–3 |
| Chevrolet Corvette | 11 | (United States) Justin Oakes | R | 1, 5 |
| Chevrolet Corvette | 26 | (United States) Aaron Pierce | | 1 |
| Chevrolet Corvette | 28 | (United States) Lou Gigliotti | M | 1, 3, 5 |
| Chevrolet Corvette | 97 | (United States) Michael Phillips | | 3 |
| Dodge Viper | 84 | (United States) Lee Saunders | | 1, 3 |
| Ford Mustang | 86 | (United States) John Baucom | | 1 |
| Ford Mustang | 96 | (United States) James Candelaria | R | 1 |
| Ford Mustang GT4 | 14 | (United States) Billy Griffin | | 1, 3 |
| Porsche 991.1 GT3 Cup | 6 | (United States) Carey Grant | | 3 |
| Porsche 991.1 GT3 Cup | 55 | (United States) Milton Grant | M | 3 |
GT
| BMW E92 M3 | 51 | (United States) Jason Merck | | 3 |
| Ford Mustang | 94 | (United States) Philip Di Pippo | | 1 |
Entry Lists:

| Icon | Class |
|---|---|
| R | Rookie |
| M | Master |
| | Pro/Am Challenge |

=== West Coast Championship ===
TA2
| Car | No. | Driver | Rounds |
|---|---|---|---|
| Chevrolet Camaro | 03 | (United States) Nick Roseno | 2 |
| Chevrolet Camaro | 11 | (United States) Jeff Holden | 1–2 |
| Chevrolet Camaro | 19 | (United States) Matthew Butson | 1 |
| Chevrolet Camaro | 25 | (United States) Tom Klauer | 1–2 |
| Chevrolet Camaro | 28 | (United States) Connor Mosack | 1 |
| Chevrolet Camaro | 30 | (United States) Michele Abbate | 1–2 |
| Chevrolet Camaro | 33 | (United States) Greg Tolson | 2 |
| Chevrolet Camaro | 65 | (United States) Joe Bogetich | 1 |
| Chevrolet Camaro | 66 | (United States) Michael Fine | 1–2 |
| Chevrolet Camaro | 67 | (Canada) Dave Kunicki | 1–2 |
| Chevrolet Camaro | 68 | (United States) Steve Hodge | 1 |
| Chevrolet Camaro | 68 | (United States) Curt Kallberg | 1–2 |
| Chevrolet Camaro | 72 | (United States) Michelle Nagai | 1–2 |
| Chevrolet Camaro | 83 | (United States) Cameron Parsons | 1–2 |
| Dodge Challenger | 45 | (United States) Darrell Anderson | 1–2 |
| Ford Mustang | 16 | (United States) Jim Gallaugher | 2 |
| Ford Mustang | 17 | (United States) Tim Lynn | 1–2 |
| Ford Mustang | 18 | (United States) Robert Accardo Jr. | 2 |
| Ford Mustang | 24 | (United States) Brad McAllister | 1–2 |
| Ford Mustang | 29 | (Mexico) Mitch Marvosh | 1–2 |
| Ford Mustang | 34 | (United States) Jim Gallaugher | 1 |
| Ford Mustang | 47 | (United States) Carl Rydquist | 1–2 |
| Ford Mustang | 62 | (United States) Colby Hillman | 1 |
| Ford Mustang | 63 | (United States) Walt Brown Jr. | 1 |
| Ford Mustang | 99 | (United States) Walt Brown Jr. | 2 |
XGT
| Mercedes-AMG GT3 | 59 | (United States) Simon Gregg | 1 |
| Porsche 991 GT3 R | 10 | (United States) Erich Joiner | 1 |
SGT
| Chevrolet Corvette | 9 | (United States) Sean Whitwood | 1 |
| Chevrolet Monte Carlo | 60 | (United States) Rudy Revak | 1 |
| Holden Commodore | 00 | (United States) John Schweitzer | 1 |
| Porsche Cayman GT4 | 77 | (United States) Rob Crocker | 1 |
| Porsche Cayman Clubsport | 7 | (United States) Gene Sigal | 1 |
Entry Lists:

== Race schedule and results ==
=== National Championship ===
A 15-round preliminary schedule was released on October 19, 2020 ahead of the final two rounds of the 2020 season. The schedule represented a return to normality after the Coronavirus outbreak heavily impacted the 2020 season. Trans-Am will be having its first ever race at the newly renovated Charlotte Motor Speedway Roval and a TA2-only round at the inaugural running of the Music City Grand Prix on the streets of Nashville. No double-headers are scheduled to return following their appearances in 2020; however, all tracks that were featured on the preliminary 2020 calendar are scheduled for 2021 as well. For the first time in series history, Trans-Am is instituting a drop-round system where competitors can choose to drop their two worst round results including non-appearances that took place before August 1. On April 30, Trans-Am announced that the scheduled round at Canadian Tire Motorsport Park had been cancelled due to the ongoing pandemic, replaced by an additional round at the following Watkins Glen International meeting.

| Races | Circuit | Date | TA Winning driver | TA2 Winning driver | XGT Winning driver | SGT Winning driver | GT Winning driver | Supporting |
|---|---|---|---|---|---|---|---|---|
| 1 | Sebring International Raceway | February 19–21 | (United States) Chris Dyson | (United States) Thomas Merrill | None entered | (United States) Justin Oakes | (United States) Philip Di Pippo | SVRA |
| 2 | Charlotte Motor Speedway | March 19–21 | (Panama) Oscar Teran | (United States) Sam Mayer | None entered | (United States) Mark Brummond | None entered | SVRA |
| 3 | Michelin Raceway Road Atlanta | March 26–28 | (United States) Boris Said | (United States) Franklin Futrelle | None entered | (United States) Mark Brummond | (United States) Jason Merck | SVRA Formula Regional Americas Formula 4 United States |
| 4 | Sonoma Raceway | April 23–25 | (United States) Chris Dyson | (United States) Sam Mayer | None entered | None entered | None entered | SVRA |
| 5 | WeatherTech Raceway Laguna Seca | April 30–May 2 | (United States) Tomy Drissi | (Brazil) Rafa Matos | (United States) Erich Joiner | (United States) Justin Oakes | None entered | SVRA |
| 6 | Lime Rock Park | May 28–31 | (United States) Chris Dyson | (United States) Mike Skeen | (United States) Erich Joiner | (United States) Michael Phillips | (United States) Philip Di Pippo | SVRA |
| 7 | Mid-Ohio Sports Car Course | June 25–27 | (United States) Chris Dyson | (Brazil) Rafa Matos | (United States) Erich Joiner | (United States) Justin Oakes | None entered | SVRA |
| 8 | Road America | July 2–4 | (United States) Chris Dyson | (United States) Sam Mayer | (United States) Erich Joiner | (United States) Justin Oakes | None entered | NASCAR Cup Series NASCAR Xfinity Series |
| 9 | Brainerd International Raceway | July 16–18 | (United States) Ernie Francis Jr. | (Brazil) Rafa Matos | None entered | None entered | None entered | SVRA Formula Regional Americas Formula 4 United States |
| 10 | Nashville Street Circuit (Note: The Trans Am Series round at the Nashville Street Circuit is for TA2 entries only.) | August 6–8 | Not awarded | (United States) Mike Skeen | Not awarded | Not awarded | Not awarded | IndyCar Series GT America |
| - | ~~Canadian Tire Motorsport Park~~ | ~~September 3–5~~ | Round Cancelled | Round Cancelled | Round Cancelled | Round Cancelled | Round Cancelled | ~~NASCAR Truck Series~~ |
| 11 | Watkins Glen International | September 10–12 | (United States) Chris Dyson | (Brazil) Rafa Matos | (United States) Erich Joiner | (United States) Justin Oakes | None entered | SVRA |
| 12 | Watkins Glen International | September 10–12 | (United States) Chris Dyson | (United States) Connor Mosack | (United States) Erich Joiner | (United States) Justin Oakes | None entered | SVRA |
| 13 | Virginia International Raceway | September 24–26 | (United States) Chris Dyson | (Brazil) Rafa Matos | None entered | (United States) Lee Saunders | None entered | SVRA |
| 14 | Circuit of the Americas | November 5–7 | (Australia) Matthew Brabham | (Brazil) Rafa Matos | (United States) Erich Joiner | (United States) Natalie Decker | (United States) Sean Young | SVRA |

Race is combined with Trans-Am West Coast Series
Race counts only for Pro/Am Challenge points

=== West Coast Championship ===
A 7-round preliminary schedule was released on October 28, 2020 ahead of the final round of the 2020 national championship season. The schedule represented a return to normality after the Coronavirus outbreak heavily impacted the 2020 season. The West Coast series will be hosting its first ever races at Utah Motorsports Park and The Ridge Motorsports Park.

| Races | Circuit | Date | TA Winning driver | TA2 Winning driver | XGT Winning driver | SGT Winning driver | GT Winning driver | Supporting |
|---|---|---|---|---|---|---|---|---|
| 1 | Sonoma Raceway | April 23–25 | None entered | (United States) Carl Rydquist | (United States) Simon Gregg | (United States) Rob Crocker | None entered | SVRA |
| 2 | WeatherTech Raceway Laguna Seca | May 1–2 | (United States) Steve Goldman | (United States) Tim Lynn | (United States) Erich Joiner | (United States) Rob Crocker | None entered | SVRA |
| 3 | Thunderhill Raceway Park | May 15–16 | None entered | (United States) Carl Rydquist | None entered | (United States) John Schweitzer | None entered | Classic Sports Racing Group |
| 4 | The Ridge Motorsports Park | June–13 | None entered | (United States) Carl Rydquist | None entered | (United States) Cindi Lux | None entered | SVRA |
| 5 | Portland International Raceway | July 24–25 | None entered | (United States) Tim Lynn | None entered | (United States) Cindi Lux | None entered | SVRA |
| 6 | Utah Motorsports Park | October 9–10 | None entered | (United States) Carl Rydquist | (United States) Erich Joiner | (United States) Cindi Lux | None entered | SVRA |
| 7 | Circuit of the Americas | November 6–7 | None entered | (United States) Ken Sutherland | (United States) Erich Joiner | (United States) Cindi Lux | None entered | SVRA |

Race is combined with Trans-Am National Series

== Championship Standings ==
=== Points System ===
| Race Position | **1** | **2** | **3** | **4** | **5** | **6** | **7** | **8** | **9** | **10** | **11** | **12** | **13** | **14** | **15** | **16** | **17** | **18** | **19** | **20** | **21** | **22** | **23** | **24** | **25+** |
| Points | 30 | 27 | 25 | 23 | 21 | 20 | 19 | 18 | 17 | 16 | 15 | 14 | 13 | 12 | 11 | 10 | 9 | 8 | 7 | 6 | 5 | 4 | 3 | 2 | 1 |

| Qualifying Position | **1st** | **2nd** | **3rd** | LL | LML | R | M |
| Points | 3 | 2 | 1 | **1** | **1*** | Rookie | Master |

When only one driver is entered in a class, half of the point value is awarded; if two drivers then 60% points, if three then 70% points, if four then 85% points. If there are fewer than three drivers, qualifying points are not awarded. If there are fewer than five drivers, lap leading points are not awarded.

Pro/Am Challenge drivers cannot earn points for the National Championship or West Coast and vice versa. Pro/Am Challenge points are counted for the two Pro/Am Challenge races as well as four National Championship or West Coast Championship events of each competitor's choice. One of the Pro/Am Challenge races was held in combination with a West Coast Championship race, however the results and classification were separate.

Awards are given to the highest ranked Master and Rookie drivers in each class. The Master classification is given to drivers over 60 years old while the Rookie classification is for drivers competing in their first full year. Some drivers may be eligible for both.

In the National Championship, each driver's worst two round results including non-appearances before August 1 are dropped.

=== National Championship ===
==== TA ====
| Pos. | Driver | Class | Car | SEB | CLT | ATL | SON | LGA | LIM | MOH | ELK | BRA | WGL1 | WGL2 | VIR | AUS | Points |
National Championship
| 1 | (United States) Chris Dyson | | Ford Mustang | **1** | | 5 | 1 | **5^{1*}** | **1^{2*}** | **1^{3}** | **1^{3*}** | **3^{3}** | **1^{2}** | **1^{2*}** | **1^{1*}** | | 302 |
| 2 | (United States) Tomy Drissi | | Chevrolet Camaro | **4^{2}** | | 13^{1} | | 1^{3} | 2 | 2^{1*} | **7^{1}** | **2^{2}** | 6 | 7^{3} | 7^{2} | 3^{3} | 268 |
| 3 | (United States) Ernie Francis Jr. | | Ford Mustang | **2^{1*}** | | **2^{3*}** | | 11^{2} | 10^{1} | 9 | 13 | 1 | **8^{1*}** | **6^{1}** | 5 | **2^{1*}** | 257 |
| 4 | (United States) Ken Thwaits | M | Dodge Challenger | 8 | 3 | 11 | | 3 | 9 | 11 | 10 | 4^{1} | 4 | 5 | 3 | 11 | 211 |
| 5 | (United States) Amy Ruman | | Chevrolet Corvette | 6 | | 12 | | 8 | 8 | 4 | 14 | 5 | 3 | 4 | | 10 | 188 |
| 6 | (United States) Simon Gregg | | Chevrolet Camaro | 11 | 2 | 10 | | 6 | 5 | 3^{2} | 6 | | 7 | | 6 | 6 | 178 |
| 7 | (United States) Boris Said | | Dodge Challenger | | | **1^{2}** | | **4** | | | **2^{2}** | | DNS | 2 | 2^{3} | | 142 |
| 8 | (United States) Kerry Hitt | M | Cadillac CTS-V | | | 14 | | 10 | 7 | 6 | 16 | | 9 | | 4 | 9 | 134 |
| 9 | (United States) Richard Grant | M | Chevrolet Corvette | 7 | | | | | | 7 | 12 | | 5 | 8 | | 7 | 110 |
| 10 | (United States) David Pintaric | | Ford Mustang | 12 | | 4 | | 9 | 6 | 10 | 17 | | | | | | 99 |
| 11 | (United Kingdom) Guy Smith | R | Ford Mustang | | | | | | | | 3 | | 2^{3} | 3 | | | 78 |
| 12 | (United Kingdom) Humaid Al Masaood | | Ford Mustang | | | 8 | 2 | 2 | | | | | | | | 5 | 66 |
| 13 | (United States) Justin Marks | R | Chevrolet Corvette | 5 | | 3 | | 7 | | | | | | | | | 65 |
| 14 | (United States) Paul Fix | | Chevrolet Corvette | | | | | | 4 | 8 | | | 11 | | | | 56 |
| 15 | (United States) Adam Andretti | | Dodge Challenger | 3^{3} | | 7 | | | | | | | | | | | 45 |
| 15 | (United States) Adam Andretti | | Chevrolet Corvette | | 4 | | | | | | | | | | | | 45 |
| 16 | (Australia) Matthew Brabham | | Ford Mustang | | | | | | | | | | | | | **1^{2}** | 33 |
| 17 | (United States) Matthew Butson | R | Chevrolet Corvette | | | | | | | | 11 | | | | 8 | | 33 |
| 18 | (United States) Andy Lally | R | Ford Mustang | | | | | | 3^{3} | | | | | | | | 26 |
| 19 | (United States) Cody Ware | R | Chevrolet Corvette | | | | | | | | 5 | | | | | | 21 |
| 20 | (United States) Denny Lamers | | Ford Mustang | | | | | | | | 8 | | | | | | 18 |
| 21 | (United States) Cliff Ebben | | Ford Mustang | | | | | | | | 15 | | | | | | 11 |
Pro/Am Challenge
| 1 | (Panama) Oscar Teran | | Ford Mustang | 10 | 1^{1} | 6 | | | | | 4 | | 10 | | | 4 | 127 |
| 2 | (United States) Jeff Hinkle | | Dodge Challenger | 9 | DNS | 9 | | | | | | | | | | | 34 |
| 3 | (United States) Ryan McManus | | Chevrolet Corvette | | | | | | | 5 | | | | | DNS | | 21 |
| 4 | (Panama) Jose Chocron | | Chevrolet Corvette | | | | | | | | | | | | | 8 | 18 |
| 5 | (United States) A. J. Henriksen | | Chevrolet Corvette | | DNS | | | | | | 9 | | | | | | 17 |
| Pos. | Driver | Class | Car | SEB | CLT | ATL | SON | LGA | LIM | MOH | ELK | BRA | WGL1 | WGL2 | VIR | AUS | Points |

| Colour | Result |
|---|---|
| Gold | Winner |
| Silver | Second place |
| Bronze | Third place |
| Green | Points classification |
| Blue | Non-points classification |
| Blue | Non-classified finish (NC) |
| Purple | Retired, not classified (Ret) |
| Red | Did not qualify (DNQ) |
| Red | Did not pre-qualify (DNPQ) |
| Black | Disqualified (DSQ) |
| White | Did not start (DNS) |
| White | Withdrew (WD) |
| White | Race cancelled (C) |
| Blank | Did not practice (DNP) |
| Blank | Did not arrive (DNA) |
| Blank | Excluded (EX) |

^{1, 2, 3} - Qualifying position (only shown for point-awarding positions)
**Bold** - Lead a lap
* - Lead most laps
Italics - Fastest lap

==== TA2 ====
| Pos. | Driver | Class | Car | SEB | CLT | ATL | SON | LGA | LIM | MOH | ELK | BRA | NAS | WGL1 | WGL2 | VIR | AUS | Points |
National Championship
| 1 | (Brazil) Rafa Matos | | Ford Mustang | **2^{2*}** | | 8 | | **1^{2*}** | **3^{2*}** | **1^{1*}** | 3 | **1^{1*}** | 7 | **1^{2*}** | 3^{1} | **1^{2*}** | | 322 |
| 2 | (United States) Mike Skeen | | Chevrolet Camaro | 3 | | 5^{3} | | **2^{1}** | **1^{1}** | 26 | **2^{1}** | **2^{2}** | **1^{1*}** | **3^{1}** | 15 | 3^{3} | | 274 |
| 3 | (United States) Connor Mosack | | Chevrolet Camaro | 17 | 3 | 4 | 2 | 13 | 4^{3} | 3 | 23 | 4 | **3^{2}** | 4 | **1^{2*}** | 13 | | 218 |
| 4 | (United States) Thomas Merrill | | Ford Mustang | **1^{1}** | | 3 | DNS | **3^{3}** | 5 | | 33^{2} | **15^{3}** | 2^{3} | 2 | 16 | 2 | | 215 |
| 5 | (United States) Adrian Wlostowski | | Chevrolet Camaro | 18 | | 14 | | 18 | 7 | 5 | 6 | 5 | 8 | 9 | 5 | 14 | | 177 |
| 6 | (United States) Keith Prociuk | | Ford Mustang | 7 | | 9 | | 14 | 17 | 8 | 11 | 6 | | 8 | 6 | 6 | | 168 |
| 7 | (United States) Tyler Kicera | **R** | Ford Mustang | 19 | | 22 | | 6 | 8 | 4^{2} | 31 | 3 | 32 | 20 | 2 | 7 | | 153 |
| 8 | (United States) Scott Borchetta | | Ford Mustang | 15 | 6 | 10 | 3 | 8 | 16 | 22 | 4 | DNS | 18 | 10 | 7 | 5 | | 146 |
| 9 | (United States) Tom Sheehan | | Ford Mustang | 8 | | 20 | | 15 | 9 | 12 | 12 | 7 | 17 | 11 | 10 | 20 | | 145 |
| 10 | (United States) Doug Peterson | **M** | Ford Mustang | 6 | | 24 | | 17 | 12 | 17 | 14 | 9 | 25 | 13 | 12 | 8 | | 130 |
| 11 | (United States) Rhett Barkau | **R** | Dodge Challenger | 10 | | 11 | | | 10 | 19 | 9 | 8 | 12 | 23 | 9 | 23 | | 126 |
| 12 | (United States) Adam Andretti | | Ford Mustang | | | | | | | 2^{3} | 36 | 19 | **21** | 6 | 4 | 4 | | 108 |
| 13 | (United States) Maurice Hull | **M** | Chevrolet Camaro | 13 | | 13 | | | 13 | 24 | 17 | 14 | 19 | 17 | 18 | 11 | | 101 |
| 14 | (United States) Edward Sevadjian | | Chevrolet Camaro | 20 | | 23 | | 4 | 20 | 6 | 34 | 16 | 11 | 21 | | | | 89 |
| 15 | (Canada) Misha Goikhberg | | Chevrolet Camaro | **22^{3}** | | 6 | | | 6 | | | | | 5^{3} | 14^{3} | | | 81 |
| 16 | (United States) Michael Self | **R** | Chevrolet Camaro | 4 | | 25 | | 7 | | 21 | | 18 | 30 | 16 | 20 | 19 | | 80 |
| 17 | (United States) Jim Gallaugher | | Ford Mustang | 21 | | 21 | | | | 27 | | 10 | 15 | 22 | 8 | 9 | | 77 |
| 18 | (United States) Franklin Futrelle | **R** | Ford Mustang | 5 | | **1^{2*}** | | | | | | | 6 | | | | | 75 |
| 19 | (United States) Jack Wood | **R** | Chevrolet Camaro | | | | | | | | | 11 | | 7 | 13 | | | 47 |
| 20 | (United States) Steven Lustig | | Chevrolet Camaro | 23 | | | | 12 | 11 | 14 | | | 34 | | | | | 45 |
| 21 | (United States) Doug Winston | | Chevrolet Camaro | | | 17 | | | 15 | | 21 | | 24 | 19 | 19 | | | 41 |
| 22 | (United States) Evan Slater | **R** | Dodge Challenger | | | | | | 14 | 11 | | | | | | 16 | | 37 |
| 23 | (United States) Darin Mock | **R** | Ford Mustang | | | | | | | 10 | | | 27 | | | 10 | | 33 |
| 24 | (United States) Ty Young | **R** | Ford Mustang | 11 | | | | 9 | | | | | | | | | | 32 |
| 25 | (Canada) Roberto Sabato | | Ford Mustang | | | | | | | | 15 | | | 12 | 17 | | | 31 |
| 26 | (United States) Elias Anderson | | Ford Mustang | | | | | | | 9 | 13 | | | | | | | 30 |
| 27 | (United States) Barry Boes | | Ford Mustang | | | 18 | | 16 | | 28 | 32 | | 28 | | | 17 | | 30 |
| 28 | (United States) Dillon Machavern | | Chevrolet Camaro | | | | | | 2 | | | | | | | | | 27 |
| 29 | (United States) Ken Thwaits | **M** | Dodge Challenger | | | | | 11 | | DNS | | | 14 | | | | | 27 |
| 30 | (United States) Curt Vogt | **M** | Ford Mustang | WD | | 19 | | | | 20 | | | | 14 | | DNS | | 26 |
| 31 | (United States) Justin Marks | **R** | Chevrolet Camaro | | | | | | | | | | 4 | | | | | 23 |
| 32 | (United States) Al Prieto | **R** | Ford Mustang | DNS | | | | | | | | | | 18 | 11 | | | 23 |
| 33 | (United States) Tim Gray | **M** | Ford Mustang | 14 | | | | | | | 24 | 17 | | | | | | 23 |
| 34 | (United States) Justin Oakes | | Dodge Challenger | | | | | | | | DNS | | 5 | | | | | 21 |
| 35 | (United States) Austin Dillon | **R** | Chevrolet Camaro | | | | | | | | 5 | | | | | | | 21 |
| 36 | (United States) Scott Lagasse Jr. | | Chevrolet Camaro | 24 | | 7 | | | | | | | | | | | | 21 |
| 37 | (United States) John Cloud | **M** | Chevrolet Camaro | DNS | | 16 | | | | 18 | | | | | | 24 | | 20 |
| 38 | (United States) Nicolas Hammann | **R** | Ford Mustang | | | | | | | | 7 | | | | | | | 19 |
| 39 | (United States) Chris Liesfeld | | Chevrolet Camaro | | | | | | | | | | 13 | | | 21 | | 18 |
| 40 | (United States) Patrick Paul | **R** | Ford Mustang | | | | | | 19 | | DNS | | DNS | | | 15 | | 18 |
| 41 | (United States) Blaise Csida | | Chevrolet Camaro | 9 | | | | | | | | | | | | | | 17 |
| 42 | (United States) Boris Said | | Chevrolet Camaro | | | | | | | | | | 9 | | | | | 17 |
| 43 | (United States) Jordan Bupp | | Chevrolet Camaro | | | | | | | | | | 10 | | | | | 16 |
| 44 | (United States) Ryan Newman | **R** | Ford Mustang | | | | | | | | 10 | | | | | | | 16 |
| 45 | (United States) Ike Keeler | **M**/**R** | Ford Mustang | 12 | | | | | | | | | | | | | | 14 |
| 46 | (United States) Matt Gray | **R** | Ford Mustang | | | | | | | | | 13 | | | | | | 13 |
| 47 | (United States) Jeff Wood | **R** | Chevrolet Camaro | | | | | | | 13 | | | | | | | | 13 |
| 48 | (United States) Matt Parent | | Ford Mustang | | | 15 | | | | | | | | | | | | 11 |
| 49 | (United States) Luke Rumberg | **R** | Ford Mustang | | | | | | | 16 | | | | | | | | 10 |
| 50 | (United States) Patrick Utt | **R** | Chevrolet Camaro | | | | | | | | 16 | | | | | | | 10 |
| 51 | (United States) William Moore | **M**/**R** | Chevrolet Camaro | | | | | | | 23 | 20 | | | | | | | 9 |
| 52 | (United States) Mark Brummond | | Chevrolet Camaro | | | | | | | | 18 | | | | | | | 8 |
| 53 | (United States) Kevin Clifford | **R** | Chevrolet Camaro | | | | | | | | | | 22 | | | | | 4 |
| 54 | (United States) Ty Gibbs | **R** | Ford Mustang | | 2 | | | | | | 28 | | | | | | | 1 |
| 55 | (United States) Harrison Burton | **R** | Chevrolet Camaro | | 5 | | | | | | 25 | | | | | | | 1 |
| 56 | (United States) Bruce Nesbitt | | Ford Mustang | | | | | | | | 26 | | | | | | | 1 |
| 57 | (Mexico) Daniel Suárez | **R** | Chevrolet Camaro | | | | | | | | | | 26 | | | | | 1 |
| 58 | (United States) Riley Herbst | **R** | Ford Mustang | | | | | | | | 27 | | | | | | | 1 |
| 59 | (United States) Christopher Bell | **R** | Chevrolet Camaro | | | | | | | | 29 | | | | | | | 1 |
| 60 | (United States) Austin Green | **R** | Chevrolet Camaro | | | | | | | | 30 | | | | | | | 1 |
| 61 | (United States) Bruce Raymond | | Ford Mustang | | | | | | | | | | 31 | | | | | 1 |
| 62 | (United States) Tony Ave | | Ford Mustang | | | | | | | | | | 33 | | | | | 1 |
| 63 | (United States) Aaron Pierce | | Chevrolet Camaro | | | | | | | | 35 | | DNS | | | | | 1 |
| 64 | (United States) Joey Hand | **R** | Ford Mustang | | | | | | | | | | 35 | | | | | 1 |
| - | (United States) Brandon Jones | | Chevrolet Camaro | | 4 | | | | | | | | | | | | | - |
| - | (United States) Corey Heim | | Ford Mustang | | 9 | | | | | | | | | | | | | - |
Pro/Am Challenge
| 1 | (United States) Sam Mayer | | Chevrolet Camaro | | **1^{1*}** | **2^{1}** | **1^{1*}** | 5 | | | **1^{3*}** | | | | | | | 149 |
| 2 | (United States) Bruce Raymond | | Ford Mustang | 16 | 8 | 12 | | | | 25 | 22 | | | 15 | | | | 59 |
| 3 | (United States) Evan Pecore | **R** | Chevrolet Camaro | | | | | | | 7 | 8 | | 20 | | | | | 43 |
| 4 | (United States) Alex Wright | | Ford Mustang | | 7 | | | | 18 | 15 | | | 23 | | | | | 41 |
| 5 | (United States) Chad Christensen | **R** | Ford Mustang | | | | | | | | | 12 | | | | 18 | | 22 |
| 6 | (United States) Marc Austin | | Chevrolet Camaro | | | | | | | | 19 | | | | | 12 | | 21 |
| 7 | (United States) Drew Newbauer | | Ford Mustang | | | | | 10 | | | | | | | | | | 16 |
| 8 | (United States) Ricky Sanders | | Chevrolet Camaro | | | 26 | | | | | | | 16 | | | | | 11 |
| 9 | (United States) Connor Zilisch | **R** | Ford Mustang | | | | | | | | | | | | | **22^{1}** | | 8 |
| 10 | (United States) Danny Lowry | | Chevrolet Camaro | | | | | | | | | | 29 | | | | | 1 |
| 11 | (United States) Michael Attaway | | Chevrolet Camaro | | | | | | | | | | 36 | | | | | 1 |
| Pos. | Driver | Class | Car | SEB | CLT | ATL | SON | LGA | LIM | MOH | ELK | BRA | NAS | WGL1 | WGL2 | VIR | AUS | Points |

==== XGT ====
| Pos. | Driver | Class | Car | SEB | CLT | ATL | SON | LGA | LIM | MOH | ELK | BRA | WGL1 | WGL2 | VIR | AUS | Points |
National Championship
| 1 | (United States) Erich Joiner | | Porsche 991 GT3 R | | | | | **1^{1*}** | **1^{1*}** | **1^{1*}** | **1^{1*}** | | 1^{1} | 1^{1} | | | 102 |
| 2 | (United States) Mike Weathers | **R** | Chevrolet Corvette | | | | | 2^{2} | | 2^{2} | | | | | | | 32 |
| 3 | (United States) Simon Gregg | | Mercedes-AMG GT3 | | | | | | | | | | | 2^{2} | | | 16 |
| 4 | (United States) Randy Hale | **R** | Chevrolet Corvette | | | | | | | | | | 2^{2} | | | | 16 |
| Pos. | Driver | Class | Car | SEB | CLT | ATL | SON | LGA | LIM | MOH | ELK | BRA | WGL1 | WGL2 | VIR | AUS | Points |

==== SGT ====
| Pos. | Driver | Class | Car | SEB | CLT | ATL | SON | LGA | LIM | MOH | ELK | BRA | WGL1 | WGL2 | VIR | AUS | Points |
National Championship
| 1 | (United States) Justin Oakes | R | Chevrolet Corvette | **1^{1*}** | | | | **1^{1*}** | 3^{1} | **1^{1*}** | **1^{2*}** | | **1^{1*}** | **1^{1*}** | | | 199 |
| 2 | (United States) Milton Grant | M | Porsche 991.1 GT3 Cup | | | 4 | | | | 4 | 4 | | 3^{2} | **3^{3}** | 2^{3} | | 139 |
| 3 | (United States) Carey Grant | | Porsche 991.1 GT3 Cup | | | 5 | | | | 5 | 3 | | 2^{3} | 4 | 4 | | 129 |
| 4 | (United States) Lee Saunders | | Dodge Viper | **2^{2}** | | 7^{3} | | | | | 2^{3} | | | | **1^{1*}** | | 110 |
| 5 | (United States) Michael Phillips | | Chevrolet Corvette | 3 | | **2^{1}** | | | 1^{2} | | **5^{1}** | | | | | | 101 |
| 6 | (United States) John Baucom | | Ford Mustang | 8 | | 6 | | | | 6 | | | | | 5 | | 77 |
| 7 | (United States) Lou Gigliotti | M | Chevrolet Corvette | 4 | | 3^{2} | | 2^{2} | | | | | | | | | 66 |
| 8 | (United States) Billy Griffin | | Ford Mustang GT4 | 6 | | DNS | | | | 2 | | | | | | | 47 |
| 9 | (United States) Steven Davison | | Aston Martin Vantage GT4 | 5 | | 8 | | | | | | | | | | | 39 |
| 10 | (United States) Aaron Pierce | | Chevrolet Corvette | 7^{3} | | | | | | | 8 | | | | | | 38 |
| 11 | (United States) Paul Fix | | Audi R8 | | | | | | | | | | | | **3^{2}** | | 26 |
| 12 | (United States) Seth Lucas | R | Audi R8 | | | | | | | 3^{3} | | | | | | | 26 |
| 13 | (United States) Larry Bailey | | Chevrolet Corvette | | | | | | | | 6 | | | | | | 20 |
| 14 | (United States) Anthony Magagnoli | R | Ford Mustang | | | | | | | | 7 | | | | | | 19 |
| 15 | (United States) James Candelaria | R | Ford Mustang | 9 | | | | | | | | | | | | | 17 |
Pro/Am Challenge
| 1 | (United States) Mark Brummond | | BMW M4 GT4 | | 1 | **1^{*}** | | | | 7^{2} | | | | | | | 71 |
| 2 | (United States) Natalie Decker | | Audi R8 | | 2 | | | | | | | | 4 | 2^{2} | | | 58 |
| 3 | (United States) Jason Berkeley | | Chevrolet Corvette | | | | | | 2^{3} | | | | | | | | 19 |
| Pos. | Driver | Class | Car | SEB | CLT | ATL | SON | LGA | LIM | MOH | ELK | BRA | WGL1 | WGL2 | VIR | AUS | Points |

==== GT ====
| Pos. | Driver | Class | Car | SEB | CLT | ATL | SON | LGA | LIM | MOH | ELK | BRA | WGL1 | WGL2 | VIR | AUS | Points |
National Championship
| 1 | (United States) Philip Di Pippo | | Ford Mustang | 1 | | | | | 1 | | | | | | | | 30 |
Pro/Am Challenge
| 1 | (United States) Jason Merck | | BMW E92 M3 | | | 1 | | | | | | | | | | | 15 |
| Pos. | Driver | Class | Car | SEB | CLT | ATL | SON | LGA | LIM | MOH | ELK | BRA | WGL1 | WGL2 | VIR | AUS | Points |

=== West Coast Championship ===
==== TA2 ====
| Pos. | Driver | Car | SON | LAG | THU | RID | POR | UTA | COT | Points |
|---|---|---|---|---|---|---|---|---|---|---|
| 1 | (United States) Carl Rydquist | Ford Mustang | **1^{1*}** | **5^{1*}** | **1*** | **1*** | 14 | **1^{1*}** | | 172 |
| 2 | (United States) Tim Lynn | Ford Mustang | 6 | **1** | 2 | | 1 | 8^{3} | | 126 |
| 3 | (United States) Darrell Anderson | Dodge Challenger | 4 | | **11^{1*}** | **2^{2}** | 3 | 4 | | 121 |
| 4 | (Mexico) Mitch Marvosh | Ford Mustang | 8 | 10 | 5 | 3 | 4 | 10 | | 119 |
| 5 | (United States) Michele Abbate | Chevrolet Camaro | 5 | 14 | 9^{3} | 5 | 5 | 9 | | 110 |
| 6 | (United States) Brad McAllister | Ford Mustang | **2^{2}** | **2** | | | 12^{1} | 5 | | 96 |
| 7 | (United States) Tom Klauer | Chevrolet Camaro | 7 | 9 | 6 | | 6 | 12 | | 90 |
| 8 | (United States) Jeff Holden | Chevrolet Camaro | 10 | 4^{3} | 4 | **6^{1}** | DSQ^{3} | | | 88 |
| 9 | (United States) Michael Fine | Chevrolet Camaro | 12 | 15 | 10 | 4^{3} | 9 | | | 82 |
| 10 | (Canada) Dave Kunicki | Chevrolet Camaro | 14 | 8 | | | 2 | 7 | | 76 |
| 11 | (United States) Nick Rosseno | Chevrolet Camaro | | 3 | 3 | | | 3 | | 75 |
| 12 | (United States) Ken Sutherland | Chevrolet Camaro | | | | | **8^{2}** | 2 | | 51 |
| 13 | (United States) Matthew Butson | Chevrolet Camaro | 3^{3} | | | | 11 | | | 41 |
| 14 | (United States) Kent Stacy | Chevrolet Camaro | | | 7 | | DNS | **6^{2}** | | 41 |
| 15 | (United States) Chris Cook | Ford Mustang | | | | 7 | 7 | | | 38 |
| 16 | (United States) Troy Lindstrom | Ford Mustang | | | 8^{2} | | 10 | | | 36 |
| 17 | (United States) Michelle Nagai | Chevrolet Camaro | 11 | 7 | | | | | | 34 |
| 18 | (United States) Jim Gallaugher | Ford Mustang | 9 | 11^{2} | | | | | | 34 |
| 19 | (United States) Cameron Parsons | Chevrolet Camaro | 13 | 6 | DNS | | | | | 33 |
| 20 | (United States) Greg Tolson | Chevrolet Camaro | | 12 | DSQ | | 13 | | | 27 |
| 21 | (United States) Jason Fiorito | Ford Mustang | | | | 8 | | | | 18 |
| 22 | (United States) Joe Bogetich | Chevrolet Camaro | DNS | | DNS | | | 11 | | 15 |
| 23 | (United States) Colby Hillman | Ford Mustang | DNS | | | | | 13 | | 13 |
| 24 | (United States) Robert Accardo, Jr. | Ford Mustang | | 13 | | | | | | 13 |
| 25 | (United States) Steve Hodge | Chevrolet Camaro | DNS | | | | | | | 0 |
| 26 | (United States) Curt Kallberg | Chevrolet Camaro | DNS | | | | | | | 0 |
| 27 | (United States) Walt Brown Jr. | Ford Mustang | WD | | | | | | | 0 |
| Pos. | Driver | Car | SON | LAG | THU | RID | POR | UTA | COT | Points |

==== XGT ====
| Pos. | Driver | Car | SON | LAG | THU | RID | POR | UTA | COT | Points |
|---|---|---|---|---|---|---|---|---|---|---|
| 1 | (United States) Erich Joiner | Porsche 991 GT3 R | 2^{2} | **1^{1*}** | | | | **1^{1*}** | | 46 |
| 2 | (United States) Simon Gregg | Mercedes-AMG GT3 | **1^{1*}** | | | | | | | 18 |
| Pos. | Driver | Car | SON | LAG | THU | RID | POR | UTA | COT | Points |

==== SGT ====
| Pos. | Driver | Car | SON | LAG | THU | RID | POR | UTA | COT | Points |
|---|---|---|---|---|---|---|---|---|---|---|
| 1 | (United States) John Schweitzer | Holden Commodore | 3 | 2^{3} | **1^{1}** | 4 | 2^{2} | 2^{3} | | 110 |
| 2 | (United States) Rudy Revak | Chevrolet Monte Carlo | 4^{2} | 3^{2} | 2^{2} | 3^{2} | | | | 75 |
| 3 | (United States) Cindi Lux | Dodge Viper | | | | **1^{1*}** | **1^{1*}** | **1^{1*}** | | 68 |
| 4 | (United States) Rob Crocker | Porsche Cayman | **1^{1*}** | **1^{1*}** | | | | | | 50 |
| 5 | (United States) Dirk Leuenberger | Dodge Viper | | | | 2^{3} | | 3^{2} | | 40 |
| 6 | (United States) Gene Sigal | Porsche Cayman Clubsport | 2^{3} | | | | | | | 23 |
| 7 | (United States) Sean Whitwood | Chevrolet Corvette | DNS | | | | | | | 0 |
| Pos. | Driver | Car | SON | LAG | THU | RID | POR | UTA | COT | Points |
