= 2021 Formula Regional Americas Championship =

Motor racing competition

The 2021 Formula Regional Americas Championship powered by Honda was the fourth season for the FIA Formula 3 regional series across North America, and the second season under the Formula Regional moniker after a rebrand in 2020. The series was sanctioned by SCCA Pro Racing, the professional racing division of the Sports Car Club of America. Drivers competed to win a Honda-backed Super Formula seat in 2022.

Kyffin Simpson took the drivers' championship at the last round at the Circuit of the Americas, while TJ Speed Motorsports secured the teams' title.

== Teams and drivers ==
All drivers competed with Honda-powered Ligier JS F3 cars on Hankook tires.

Team	No.	Driver	Rounds
(United States) Jay Howard Driver Development	7	(United States) Christian Bogle	1–3
(United States) Crosslink Competition	9	(Australia) Joshua Car	All
(United States) Crosslink Competition	14	(United States) Dylan Tavella	All
(New Zealand) Kiwi Motorsport	15	(New Zealand) Kaleb Ngatoa	6
(United States) Velocity Racing Development	11	(United States) Hunter Yeany	1–4
(United States) Velocity Racing Development	11	(United States) Arias Deukmedjian	5
(United States) Velocity Racing Development	27	(United Kingdom) Matt Round-Garrido	1
(United States) Velocity Racing Development	29	(United States) Nick Persing	3–6
(United States) Velocity Racing Development	77	(United States) Jason Alder	6
(United States) (Australia) TJ Speed Motorsports	17	(France) Baptiste Berthelot	All
(United States) (Australia) TJ Speed Motorsports	19	(United States) Varun Choksey	All
(United States) (Australia) TJ Speed Motorsports	21	(Cayman Islands) Kyffin Simpson	All
(United States) (Australia) TJ Speed Motorsports	99	(Canada) Logan Cusson	All
(United States) WISKO	24	(United States) Kevin Janzen	5–6
(United States) Newman Wachs Racing	45	(Guatemala) Ian Rodríguez	1–4
(United States) Newman Wachs Racing	48	(United States) Jordan Missig	All
(United States) Newman Wachs Racing/Abel Motorsport	51	(United States) Jacob Abel	3
(United States) Crosslink/Kiwi Motorsport	78	(New Zealand) Ryan Yardley	5–6
(United States) Crosslink/Kiwi Motorsport	91	(United States) Cooper Becklin	5–6
(United States) Future Star Racing	98	(United States) Ernie Francis Jr.	All

- Erikson Evans was contracted to drive for Velocity Racing Development, but didn't appear in any rounds.

== Race calendar ==
The 2021 calendar was announced on 5 November 2020. Each round featured three races. A pre-season test was held at Virginia International Raceway as well as a Winter Cup at the road course of Homestead-Miami Speedway in February. Two rounds at Sonoma and Laguna Seca were later replaced by Road America and Brainerd International Raceway. The round at Circuit Trois-Rivières in Quebec, Canada - the planned first international event for the series - was cancelled due to border restrictions and replaced with a round at Mid-Ohio Sports Car Course.

Round		Circuit	Date	Pole position	Fastest lap	Winning driver	Winning team	Supporting
1	R1	(Georgia (U.S. state)) Road Atlanta, Braselton	27 March	(Cayman Islands) Kyffin Simpson	(Cayman Islands) Kyffin Simpson	(Cayman Islands) Kyffin Simpson	(United States) (Australia) TJ Speed Motorsports	Formula 4 United States Championship; Trans-Am Series; SVRA
1	R2	(Georgia (U.S. state)) Road Atlanta, Braselton	27 March		(Cayman Islands) Kyffin Simpson	(Cayman Islands) Kyffin Simpson	(United States) (Australia) TJ Speed Motorsports	Formula 4 United States Championship; Trans-Am Series; SVRA
1	R3	(Georgia (U.S. state)) Road Atlanta, Braselton	28 March		(Cayman Islands) Kyffin Simpson	(Cayman Islands) Kyffin Simpson	(United States) (Australia) TJ Speed Motorsports	Formula 4 United States Championship; Trans-Am Series; SVRA
2	R1	(Wisconsin) Road America, Elkhart Lake	16 May	(United States) Hunter Yeany	(Cayman Islands) Kyffin Simpson	(United States) Dylan Tavella (Note: Joshua Car was first to take the checkered flag, but was later penalized for causing a collision.)	(United States) Crosslink Competition	Formula 4 United States Championship; SVRA
2	R2	(Wisconsin) Road America, Elkhart Lake	17 May		(Australia) Joshua Car	(Cayman Islands) Kyffin Simpson	(United States) (Australia) TJ Speed Motorsports	Formula 4 United States Championship; SVRA
2	R3	(Wisconsin) Road America, Elkhart Lake	17 May		(Cayman Islands) Kyffin Simpson	(Cayman Islands) Kyffin Simpson	(United States) (Australia) TJ Speed Motorsports	Formula 4 United States Championship; SVRA
3	R1	Mid-Ohio Sports Car Course, Lexington	26 June	(Australia) Joshua Car (Note: The qualifying session was cancelled due to inclement weather. The grid for Race 1 was set by the results of the practice session.)	(United States) Jacob Abel	(Australia) Joshua Car	(United States) Crosslink Competition	Formula 4 United States Championship; Trans-Am Series; SVRA; International GT
3	R2	Mid-Ohio Sports Car Course, Lexington	27 June		(Cayman Islands) Kyffin Simpson	(United States) Jacob Abel	(United States) Newman Wachs Racing/Abel Motorsport	Formula 4 United States Championship; Trans-Am Series; SVRA; International GT
3	R3	Mid-Ohio Sports Car Course, Lexington	27 June		(United States) Dylan Tavella	(United States) Ernie Francis Jr.	(United States) Future Star Racing	Formula 4 United States Championship; Trans-Am Series; SVRA; International GT
4	R1	(Minnesota) Brainerd International Raceway, Brainerd	17 July	(Australia) Joshua Car	(United States) Jordan Missig	(Guatemala) Ian Rodríguez	(United States) Newman Wachs Racing	Formula 4 United States Championship; Trans-Am Series; SVRA
4	R2	(Minnesota) Brainerd International Raceway, Brainerd	18 July		(Australia) Joshua Car	(Australia) Joshua Car	(United States) Crosslink Competition	Formula 4 United States Championship; Trans-Am Series; SVRA
4	R3	(Minnesota) Brainerd International Raceway, Brainerd	18 July		(Australia) Joshua Car	(Australia) Joshua Car	(United States) Crosslink Competition	Formula 4 United States Championship; Trans-Am Series; SVRA
5	R1	Virginia International Raceway, Alton	25 September	(Australia) Joshua Car	(Australia) Joshua Car	(United States) Jordan Missig	(United States) Newman Wachs Racing	Formula 4 United States Championship; SVRA
5	R2	Virginia International Raceway, Alton	25 September		(Australia) Joshua Car	(United States) Ernie Francis Jr.	(United States) Future Star Racing	Formula 4 United States Championship; SVRA
5	R3	Virginia International Raceway, Alton	26 September		(Cayman Islands) Kyffin Simpson	(United States) Ernie Francis Jr.	(United States) Future Star Racing	Formula 4 United States Championship; SVRA
6	R1	(Texas) Circuit of the Americas, Austin	5 November	(Cayman Islands) Kyffin Simpson	(Cayman Islands) Kyffin Simpson	(United States) Jason Alder	(United States) Velocity Racing Development	SVRA
6	R2	(Texas) Circuit of the Americas, Austin	6 November		(Cayman Islands) Kyffin Simpson	(Cayman Islands) Kyffin Simpson	(United States) (Australia) TJ Speed Motorsports	SVRA
6	R3	(Texas) Circuit of the Americas, Austin	6 November		(United States) Dylan Tavella	(Cayman Islands) Kyffin Simpson	(United States) (Australia) TJ Speed Motorsports	SVRA

== Championship standings ==
Points were awarded as follows:

Position	**1st**	**2nd**	**3rd**	**4th**	**5th**	**6th**	**7th**	**8th**	**9th**	**10th**
Points	25	18	15	12	10	8	6	4	2	1

=== Drivers' standings ===
Pos	Driver	ATL			ROA			MOH			BRA			VIR			COA			Pts
Pos	Driver	R1	R2	R3	R1	R2	R3	R1	R2	R3	R1	R2	R3	R1	R2	R3	R1	R2	R3	Pts
1	(Cayman Islands) Kyffin Simpson	**1**	1	1	4	1	1	12	3	2	2	2	2	4	5	2	**11**	1	1	314
2	(Australia) Joshua Car	2	DNS	3	8	2	4	**1**	2	Ret	**3**	1	1	**Ret**	4	4	13†	8	3	218
3	(United States) Ernie Francis Jr.	11	5	Ret	11	5	Ret	5	4	1	DNS	Ret	7†	5	1	1	3	NC	4	160
4	(United States) Varun Choksey	6	7	4	6	3	3	6	11	11	6	3	6	8	Ret	3	8	2	11	144
5	(United States) Jordan Missig	4	3	2	3	Ret	DNS	3	Ret	10	4	DNS	8	1	3	Ret	5	NC	13	142
6	(Canada) Logan Cusson	3	4	6	10	6	Ret	7	9	3	10†	5	4	Ret	6	Ret	4	7	9	118
7	(United States) Dylan Tavella	5	2	Ret	1	8	6†	13†	12	9	7	Ret	10	2	8	Ret	DNS	NC	2	114
8	(Guatemala) Ian Rodríguez	Ret	DNS	DNS	2	10	2	11	6	5	1	4	Ret							92
9	(France) Baptiste Berthelot	10	8	Ret	7	7	7†	8	10	6	5	7	3	6	Ret	6	9	10	10	87
10	(New Zealand) Ryan Yardley													3	2	7	2	11	5	67
11	(United States) Nick Persing							9	8	4	8	6	5	10	Ret	9	10	3	6	67
12	(United States) Hunter Yeany	7	6	5	**9**	4	5	10	5	8	9	Ret	9							67
13	(United States) Jacob Abel							2	1	Ret										43
14	(United States) Jason Alder																1	5	7	41
15	(United States) Christian Bogle	8	10	NC	5	9	DNS	4	7	7										41
16	(United States) Cooper Becklin													7	7	8	7	6	12	30
17	(New Zealand) Kaleb Ngatoa																6	4	8	24
18	(United States) Arias Deukmedjian													9	10	5				13
19	(United Kingdom) Matt Round-Garrido	9	9	7																10
20	(United States) Kevin Janzen													11	9	10	12	9	14	5
Pos	Driver	R1	R2	R3	R1	R2	R3	R1	R2	R3	R1	R2	R3	R1	R2	R3	R1	R2	R3	Pts
Pos	Driver	ATL			ROA			MOH			BRA			VIR			COA			Pts

Colour	Result
Gold	Winner
Silver	Second place
Bronze	Third place
Green	Points classification
Blue	Non-points classification
Blue	Non-classified finish (NC)
Purple	Retired, not classified (Ret)
Red	Did not qualify (DNQ)
Red	Did not pre-qualify (DNPQ)
Black	Disqualified (DSQ)
White	Did not start (DNS)
White	Withdrew (WD)
White	Race cancelled (C)
Blank	Did not practice (DNP)
Blank	Did not arrive (DNA)
Blank	Excluded (EX)

**Bold** – Pole
Italics – Fastest Lap
† — Did not finish, but classified

=== Teams' standings ===
Only a team's two best-finishing cars were eligible for teams' championship points.

Pos	Team	ATL			ROA			MOH			BRA			VIR			COA			Pts
Pos	Team	R1	R2	R3	R1	R2	R3	R1	R2	R3	R1	R2	R3	R1	R2	R3	R1	R2	R3	Pts
1	(United States) (Australia) TJ Speed Motorsports	**1**	1	1	4	1	1	6	3	2	2	2	2	4	5	2	4	1	1	529
1	(United States) (Australia) TJ Speed Motorsports	3	4	4	6	3	3	7	9	3	5	3	3	6	6	3	8	2	9	529
2	(United States) Crosslink Competition (Note: Entry list has Crosslink/Kiwi Motorsport listed as a separate team of two cars, while official points list Crosslink Competition and Crosslink/Kiwi Motorsport as the same team.)	2	2	3	1	2	4	**1**	2	9	**3**	1	1	2	2	4	2	6	2	398
2	(United States) Crosslink Competition	5	DNS	Ret	8	8	6†	13†	12	Ret	7	Ret	10	3	4	7	7	8	3	398
3	(United States) Newman Wachs Racing (Note: Entry list has Newman Wachs Racing/Abel Motorsport listed as a separate team of one car, while official points list Newman Wachs Racing and Newman Wachs Racing/Abel Motorsport as the same team.)	4	3	2	2	10	2	2	1	5	1	4	8	1	3	Ret	5	NC	13	276
3	(United States) Newman Wachs Racing	Ret	DNS	DNS	3	Ret	DNS	3	6	10	4	DNS	Ret							276
4	(United States) Velocity Racing Development	7	6	5	**9**	4	5	9	5	4	8	6	5	9	10	5	1	3	6	200
4	(United States) Velocity Racing Development	9	9	7				10	8	8	9	Ret	9	10	Ret	9	10	5	7	200
5	(United States) Future Star Racing	11	5	Ret	11	5	Ret	5	4	1	DNS	Ret	7†	5	1	1	3	NC	4	160
6	(United States) Jay Howard Driver Development	8	10	NC	5	9	DNS	4	7	7										41
8	(New Zealand) Kiwi Motorsport																6	4	8	24
7	(United States) WISKO													11	9	10	12	9	14	5
Pos	Driver	R1	R2	R3	R1	R2	R3	R1	R2	R3	R1	R2	R3	R1	R2	R3	R1	R2	R3	Pts
Pos	Driver	ATL			ROA			MOH			BRA			VIR			COA			Pts
