= Brainerd International Raceway =

Road course, drag strip and kart track in Brainerd, Minnesota, USA

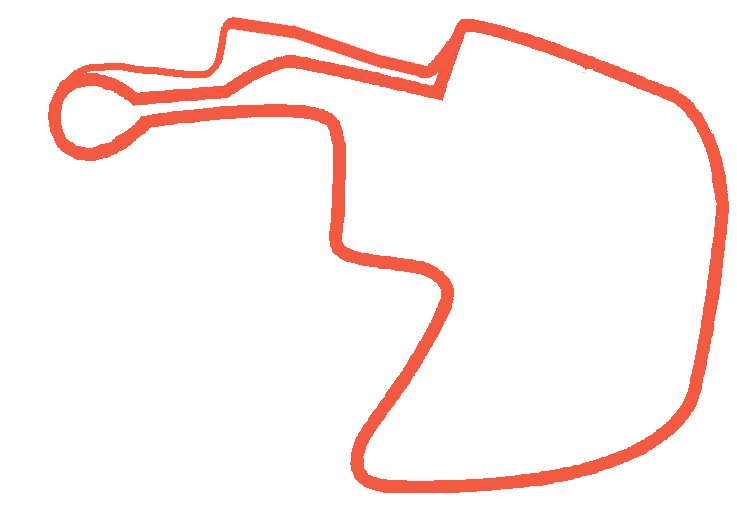
- Competition Road Course (2008–present)

- Donnybrooke Road Course (1968–present)
- Location: Crow Wing County, NW of Brainerd, Minnesota, United States
- Coordinates: 46°25′01.45″N 94°16′23.31″W
- Capacity: 20,000
- FIA Grade: 3 (Note: Brainerd International Raceway's Grade 3 licence expired 30 June 2024.)
- Owner: Kristi Copham
- Address: 5523 Birchdale Road
- Broke ground: 1967
- Opened: July 1968; 58 years ago
- Former names: Donnybrooke Speedway (1968–1973)
- Major events: Current: NHRA Mission Foods Drag Racing Series; NHRA Brainerd Nationals (1982–2019, 2021–present); Former: MotoAmerica (1983–1987, 1992–2004, 2021–2024); FR Americas (2021); Trans-Am Series (1969–1972, 1975–1978, 1980–1989, 2010–2017, 2020–2021); Pirelli World Challenge (2014); NASCAR K&N Pro Series West (2012–2013); Mazda MX-5 Cup (2011); NASCAR Midwest Series (2004); World SBK (1989–1991); IMSA GT Championship (1972, 1977–1983); Can-Am (1970–1972, 1979–1980, 1984)
- Website: https://www.birmn.com/

Competition Road Course (2008–present)
- Length: 4.023 km (2.500 mi)
- Turns: 13
- Race lap record: 1:23.109 ( (Australia) Joshua Car, Ligier JS F3, 2021, FR)

Donnybrooke Road Course (1968–present)
- Length: 4.989 km (3.100 mi)
- Turns: 10
- Race lap record: 1:27.090 ( (Republic of Ireland) Michael Roe, VDS-002, 1984, Can-Am)

Drag Strip
- Surface: Concrete/Asphalt
- Length: 0.402 km (0.250 mi)

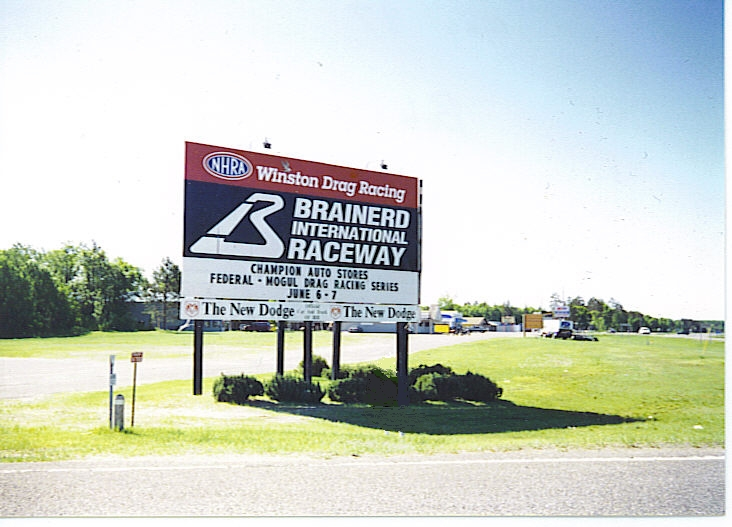
Welcome sign in May 1997

Brainerd International Raceway is a road course, and dragstrip racing complex northwest of the city of Brainerd, Minnesota. The complex has a 0.25 mi (0.40 km) dragstrip, and overlapping 2.500 mi (4.023 km) and 3.100 mi (4.989 km) road courses. The complex also includes a kart track. The raceway hosts the National Hot Rod Association's Lucas Oil Nationals. It is a popular racetrack for the Trans Am Series. The spectator seating capacity of the circuit is 20,000.

== History ==
The track opened in July 1968 by George Montgomery and Bud Stahel, after clearing a wooded area on the south side of North Long Lake. It was originally named Donnybrooke Speedway, after road racers Donny Skogmo and Brooke Kinnard who had fatal crashes at Road America two years earlier. The venue had no safety barriers, run-out areas, grandstands or even restrooms. It was SCCA's first venue in the region. It was also an NHRA-sanctioned track, with the first official event there an NHRA race, at the opening; Top Fuel Dragster was won by Doc Halladay. With the help of St Paul sports promoter Dennis Scanlan, it hosted a 2-heat USAC Indy Car race in 1969. The heats were won by Gordon Johncock and Dan Gurney.

Donnybrooke, played host to CanAm races in 1970, 1971, and 1972. These races were won by, respectively, Denny Hulme, Peter Revson, and François Cevert. In 1973 Jerry Hansen bought the track and renamed it Brainerd International Raceway.

In the 1970s, the Donnybrooke track began holding Funny Car events, in particular the Crown Auto Funny Car Championships, and in time, NHRA was convinced to stage a national event at Brainerd: in 1982, Shirley Muldowney (in Top Fuel Dragster), Frank Hawley (Top Fuel Funny Car), and Lee Shepherd (Pro Stock) were the headline winners at the first Quaker State North Star NHRA Nationals.

John Force has won at Brainerd 11 times in 15 final round appearances (1988, 1990, 1991, 1994, 1995, 1996, 1997, 1999, 2000, 2002 and 2007)

In Pro Stock, Bob Glidden won at Brainerd in 1983, 1985, 1986, and 1992.

The Brainerd strip became known as "one of the quickest and fastest in the world". It was completely resurfaced in 2003. In 2005, Tony Schumacher turned in a speed of 337.58 mph (543.28 km/h), "the fastest quarter-mile time ever", and in 2016 and 2017, national NHRA records in Funny Car were set there.

Kenny Bernstein won at Brainerd five times, 1983 and 1987 (in Funny Car) and in 1991, 1996, and 2002 (in Top Fuel Dragster).

In the summer of 2006, Jed and Kristi Copham of Forest Lake, Minnesota, became the new owners of Brainerd International Raceway.

The track hosted two NASCAR K&N Pro Series West events between 2012 and 2013. The track also hosted one NASCAR Midwest Series race in 2004.

Brainerd International Raceway was damaged during a severe thunderstorm that struck portions of Minnesota on July 12, 2015.

== Track Information ==
Brainerd International Raceway consists of 2 road tracks and 1 drag strip.

=== Donnybrooke Road Course ===
Brainerd International Raceway maintains the original name of the now 50-year-old course. The course is used for automotive and motorcycle racing.

The 3.100 mi (4.989 km) Donnybrooke Road Course has 10 turns and is considered wide – the main straight is 60 ft (18 m) wide. There is essentially no elevation change. BIR is a high-speed course; vehicles can reach speeds of nearly 180 mph (290 km/h) and take the slowest corners around 80 mph (130 km/h). There are wide runoff areas at most of the corners, which makes BIR's road course extremely safe. This configuration uses the dragstrip as part of the course.

=== Competition Road Course ===
The 2009 racing season was the first for the 2.500 mi (4.023 km) course which was completed in the 2008 summer.

Turn 1 on the 2.500 mi (4.023 km) Competition Road Course is the same as Turn 1 on the three-mile road course. Turn 1 is a narrow but very high-speed banked right-hand 60-degree turn, which is intended be taken flat out by all vehicles. Turns 1 through 8 of the original 3.100 mi (4.989 km) road course are used for the new circuit. At Turn 8, a 240-degree right-hand Clover Leaf transitions drivers from the old course to the new stretch of asphalt that winds its way back across the infield, eventually tying back into the original circuit just before Turn 1, avoiding the dragstrip. In all, the Competition Road Course features 13 turns and very little elevation change.

=== Dragstrip ===
The dragstrip dates back to 1969, when Donnybrooke converted the mile-long straightaway on its road course to a drag strip and hosted an NHRA Divisional Points Race. In 1977, BIR hosted the Crown Auto Funny Car Championships and the Crown Auto Winston Points Championship. It was reconstructed in 2005, adding a 700 ft (210 m) concrete launch pad and new asphalt for the remaining 600 ft (180 m) was installed. Tony Schumacher, set the world record for top fuel dragsters with a 337.58 mph (543.28 km/h) run in 2005. This speed and time are recorded at the end of a standing start quarter mile acceleration race, before the NHRA shortened top fuel and funny car races to the current 1,000 ft (300 m) since 2008.

Brittany Force holds the overall top fuel record at this site at 340.82 mph (548.497 km/h) in August 2025.

== Lap records ==
As of June 2024, the fastest official race lap records at the Brainerd International Raceway for different classes are listed as:

Category	Time	Driver	Vehicle	Event
Brainerd International Raceway Competition Road Course (2008–present): 2.500 mi (4.023 km)
Formula Regional	1:23.109	Joshua Car	Ligier JS F3	2021 Brainerd FR Americas round
TA1	1:27.348	Ernie Francis Jr.	Ford Mustang Trans-Am	2021 Brainerd Trans-Am round
Superbike	1:29.922	Jake Gagne	Yamaha YZF-R1	2021 Brainerd MotoAmerica round
TA2	1:31.494	Raphael Matos	Ford Mustang Trans-Am	2021 Brainerd Trans-Am round
Formula 4	1:31.585	Jason Alder	Crawford F4-16	2021 Brainerd F4 United States round
Stock 1000	1:31.831	Hayden Gillim	Honda CBR1000RR	2024 Brainerd MotoAmerica round
Supersport	1:32.787	Sean Dylan Kelly	Suzuki GSX-R600	2021 Brainerd MotoAmerica round
Twins Cup	1:35.505	Alessandro Di Mario	Aprilia RS 660	2024 Brainerd MotoAmerica round
Supersport 300	1:42.236	Gus Rodio	Kawasaki Ninja 400R	2021 Brainerd MotoAmerica round
Mazda MX-5 Cup	1:46.334	Jason Saini	Mazda MX-5 (NC)	2011 Brainerd Mazda MX-5 Cup round
Brainerd International Raceway Donnybrooke Road Course (1968–present): 3.100 mi (4.989 km)
Can-Am	1:27.090	Michael Roe	VDS-002	1984 Pepsi Grand Prix
Group 7	1:27.860	Denny Hulme	McLaren M8F	1971 Minneapolis Tribune
IMSA GTP	1:31.560	John Paul, Jr.	Porsche 935 JLP-3	1982 Pepsi Grand Prix
IMSA GTO	1:33.130	Gianpiero Moretti	Porsche 935/79	1979 Pepsi Grand Prix
IMSA GTX	1:34.170	John Paul, Jr.	Lola T600	1981 Pepsi Grand Prix
TO	1:36.086	Scott Pruett	Mercury Capri	1986 Brainerd Trans-Am round
Superbike	1:36.247	Jake Zemke	Honda CBR1000RR	2004 Brainerd AMA Superbike round
Supersport	1:38.083	Miguel Duhamel	Honda CBR600RR	2004 Brainerd AMA Supersport round
World SBK	1:40.870	Doug Polen	Ducati 888 SBK	1991 Brainerd World SBK round
IMSA GTU	1:43.510	Walt Bohren	Mazda RX-7	1980 Pepsi Grand Prix
TU	1:52.000	Horst Kwech	Alfa Romeo GTV	1972 Brainerd Trans-Am round

=== Drag strip records ===
Category	E.T.	Speed	Driver	Event	Ref
Top Fuel	3.640		Leah Pruett	2017 Lucas Oil NHRA Nationals	
Top Fuel		340.82 mph (548.50 km/h)	Brittany Force	2025 Lucas Oil NHRA Nationals	
Funny Car	3.793		Robert Hight	2017 Lucas Oil NHRA Nationals	
Funny Car		338.00 mph (543.96 km/h)	Robert Hight	2017 Lucas Oil NHRA Nationals	
Pro Stock	6.541		Erica Enders	2015 Lucas Oil NHRA Nationals	
Pro Stock		211.39 mph (340.20 km/h)	Shane Gray	2015 Lucas Oil NHRA Nationals	
