= Everett Stack =

American racing driver (born 2007)

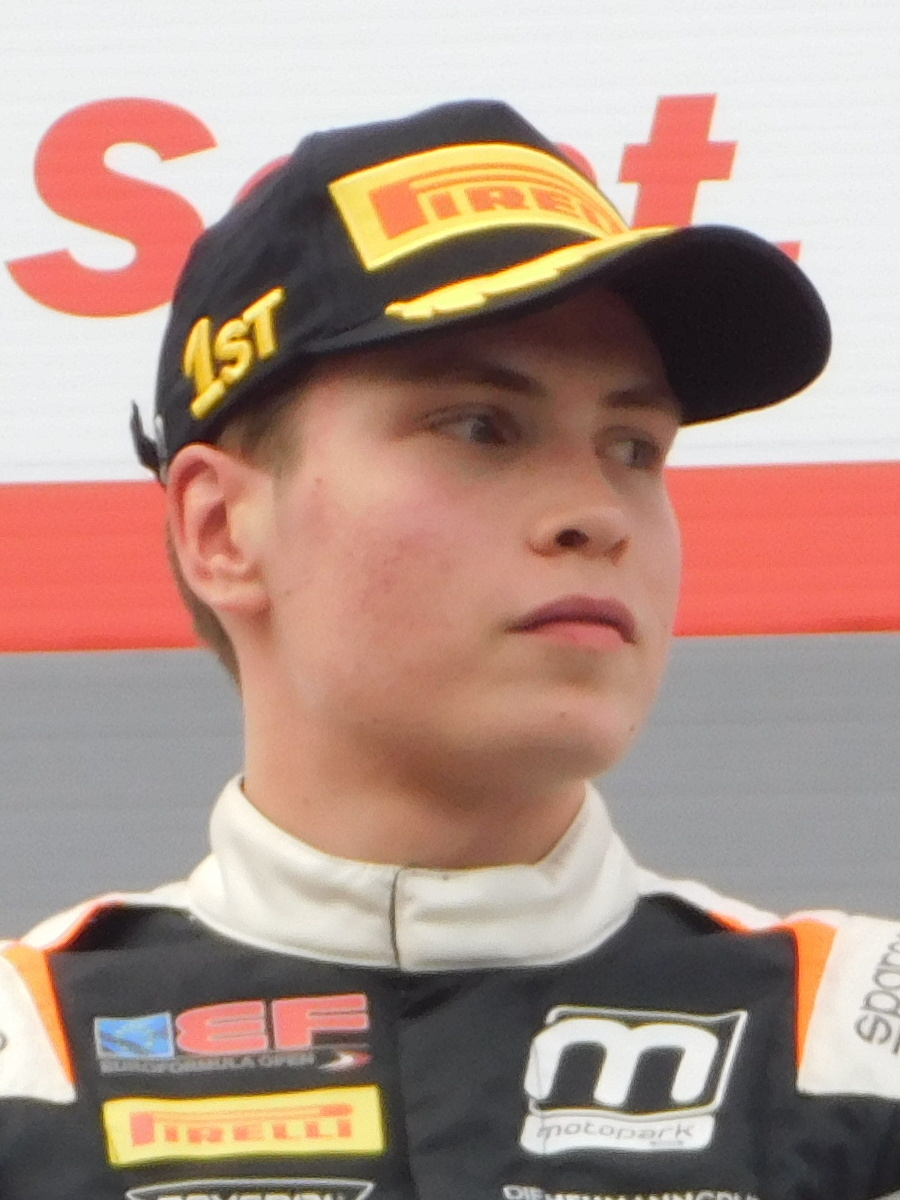
- Stack in 2025
- Nationality: (United States) American
- Born: January 5, 2007 (age 19) Belle Haven, Fairfax County, Virginia, U.S.

Euroformula Open Championship career
- Debut season: 2025
- Current team: Team Motopark
- Car number: 9
- Starts: 42
- Wins: 4
- Podiums: 14
- Poles: 0
- Fastest laps: 1
- Best finish: 5th in 2026

Previous series
- 2025 2024 2024 2024 2023 2023: Formula Regional Middle East Championship; Euro 4 Championship; Italian F4 Championship; Formula 4 UAE Championship; Formula Regional Americas Championship; Formula 4 United States Championship

Everett Stack (born January 5, 2007) is an American racing driver who last competed in the Euroformula Open Championship for Team Motopark.

== Personal life ==
Stack was born and raised in Belle Haven, Fairfax County, Virginia. His father Larry is an U.S. Air Force veteran, who worked as the Executive Vice-president of Red Hat from 2018 to 2024, before moving to Procore as its Chief Revenue Officer. In April 2026, Stack left the company to join Quantinuum as its Chief Commercial Officer.

== Career ==
Stack began testing Formula 4 machinery in 2023 for Jensen Global Advisors, after forgoing a career in karting. That year, Stack made his racing debut in the Formula 4 United States Championship with the team, in which he scored a best result of 12th in New Jersey. During the summer, Stack began testing the team's Ligier JS F3, before competing in the final two rounds of the Formula Regional Americas Championship, scoring a best result of seventh four times.

The following year, Stack moved to PHM AIX Racing to compete in the Formula 4 UAE Championship. After taking a best result of 18th in the third Abu Dhabi round, Stack remained with the team for a dual campaign in the Italian F4 and Euro 4 Championships. Between the two campaigns, Stack found more success in the former, in which he took a best result of tenth in a wet-dry race three at Le Castellet to take 27th in the overall standings. Continuing with PHM through the beginning of 2025, Stack raced with them in the Formula Regional Middle East Championship, before switching to Team Motopark for the rest of the year to enter the Euroformula Open Championship. After a quiet start to his rookie season in which he scored two podiums in the first five rounds, Stack broke through at the Red Bull Ring to take his maiden career win, before taking a win and two podiums at Monza to end the year sixth overall.

In 2026, Stack remained with Team Motopark for his second season in the Euroformula Open Championship. After taking four podiums in the first three rounds, Stack took his first win of the season at the Hungaroring, before winning at Le Castellet to enter the final three rounds runner-up in points, but fell to fifth after skipping said rounds.

== Racing record ==
=== Racing career summary ===
Season	Series	Team	Races	Wins	Poles	F/Laps	Podiums	Points	Position
2023	Formula 4 United States Championship	Jensen Global Advisors	11	0	0	0	0	0	33rd
2023	Atlantic Championship – Open	Jensen Global Advisors	2	0	0	0	2	84	6th
2023	Formula Regional Americas Championship	Jensen Global Advisors	6	0	0	0	0	28	13th
2024	Formula 4 UAE Championship	PHM AIX Racing	15	0	0	0	0	0	34th
2024	Italian F4 Championship	PHM AIX Racing	20	0	0	0	0	1	27th
2024	Formula 4 CEZ Championship	PHM AIX Racing	3	0	0	0	0	0	30th
2024	Euro 4 Championship	PHM AIX Racing	9	0	0	0	0	0	30th
2024	Eurocup-3	Palou Motorsport	2	0	0	0	0	0	NC†
2025	Formula Regional Middle East Championship	PHM Racing	15	0	0	0	0	0	27th
2025	Euroformula Open Championship	Team Motopark	24	2	0	0	6	226	6th
2026	Euroformula Open Championship	Team Motopark	15	2	0	1	8	211	5th

^{†} As Stack was a guest driver, he was ineligible to score points.

=== Complete Formula 4 United States Championship results ===
(key) (Races in bold indicate pole position) (Races in italics indicate fastest lap)

Year	Team	1	2	3	4	5	6	7	8	9	10	11	12	13	14	15	16	17	18	Pos	Points
2023	Jensen Global Advisors	NOL; 1; 25	NOL; 2 DNS	NOL; 3; 25	ROA; 1; 26	ROA; 2 Ret	ROA; 3; 19	MOH; 1; 19	MOH; 2; 22	MOH; 3; 23	NJM; 1; 12	NJM; 2; 15	NJM; 3; 21	VIR; 1	VIR; 2	VIR; 3	COA; 1	COA; 2	COA; 3	33rd	0

=== Complete Formula Regional Americas Championship results ===
(key) (Races in bold indicate pole position) (Races in italics indicate fastest lap)

Year	Team	1	2	3	4	5	6	7	8	9	10	11	12	13	14	15	16	17	18	DC	Points
2023	Jensen Global Advisors	NOL; 1	NOL; 2	NOL; 3	ROA; 1	ROA; 2	ROA; 3	MOH; 1	MOH; 2	MOH; 3	NJM; 1	NJM; 2	NJM; 3	VIR; 1; 7	VIR; 2; 7	VIR; 3; 7	COA; 1; 9	COA; 2; 9	COA; 3; 7	13th	28

=== Complete Formula 4 UAE Championship results ===
(key) (Races in bold indicate pole position) (Races in italics indicate fastest lap)

Year	Team	1	2	3	4	5	6	7	8	9	10	11	12	13	14	15	Pos	Points
2024	PHM AIX Racing	YMC1; 1; 31	YMC1; 2; 26	YMC1; 3 Ret	YMC2; 1; 25	YMC2; 2 Ret	YMC2; 3 Ret	DUB1; 1; 26	DUB1; 2 Ret	DUB1; 3 Ret	YMC3; 1; 27	YMC3; 2; 29†	YMC3; 3; 18	DUB2; 1; 27	DUB2; 2; 30	DUB2; 3; 24	34th	0

=== Complete Italian F4 Championship results ===
(key) (Races in bold indicate pole position) (Races in italics indicate fastest lap)

Year	Team	1	2	3	4	5	6	7	8	9	10	11	12	13	14	15	16	17	18	19	20	21	DC	Points
2024	PHM AIX Racing	MIS; 1; 31	MIS; 2; 19	MIS; 3; 27	IMO; 1 Ret	IMO; 2; 20	IMO; 3; 18	VLL; 1; 16	VLL; 2 Ret	VLL; 3; 31	MUG; 1; 26	MUG; 2; 25	MUG; 3; 21	LEC; 1 DNS	LEC; 2; 21	LEC; 3; 10	CAT; 1; 24	CAT; 2 Ret	CAT; 3; 25	MNZ; 1; 16	MNZ; 2; 19	MNZ; 3; 21	27th	1

=== Complete Euro 4 Championship results ===
(key) (Races in bold indicate pole position; races in italics indicate fastest lap)

Year	Team	1	2	3	4	5	6	7	8	9	DC	Points
2024	PHM AIX Racing	MUG; 1; 19	MUG; 2; 22	MUG; 3; 19	RBR; 1; 15	RBR; 2; 28	RBR; 3; 22	MNZ; 1; 17	MNZ; 2; 28	MNZ; 3; 18	30th	0

=== Complete Formula Regional Middle East Championship results ===
(key) (Races in bold indicate pole position) (Races in italics indicate fastest lap)

Year	Entrant	1	2	3	4	5	6	7	8	9	10	11	12	13	14	15	DC	Points
2025	PHM Racing	YMC1; 1; 18	YMC1; 2; 15	YMC1; 3 Ret	YMC2; 1 Ret	YMC2; 2; 19	YMC2; 3; 16	DUB; 1 Ret	DUB; 2; 25	DUB; 3; 19	YMC3; 1; 16	YMC3; 2; 15	YMC3; 3 Ret	LUS; 1 Ret	LUS; 2 Ret	LUS; 3; 20	27th	0

=== Complete Euroformula Open Championship results ===
(key) (Races in bold indicate pole position) (Races in italics indicate fastest lap)

Year	Team	1	2	3	4	5	6	7	8	9	10	11	12	13	14	15	16	17	18	19	20	21	22	23	24	Pos	Points
2025	Team Motopark	PRT; 1; 5	PRT; 2; 9	PRT; 3; 6	SPA; 1; 5	SPA; 2 Ret	SPA; 3; 7	HOC; 1; 2	HOC; 2 Ret	HOC; 3; 5	HUN; 1; 3	HUN; 2; 10	HUN; 3; 5	LEC; 1; 7	LEC; 2; 5	LEC; 3; 4	RBR; 1; 5	RBR; 2; 8	RBR; 3; 1	CAT; 1; 9	CAT; 2; 6	CAT; 3; 9†	MNZ; 1; 1	MNZ; 2; 3	MNZ; 3; 2	6th	224
2026	Team Motopark	PRT; 1; 2	PRT; 2; 3	PRT; 3; 10	SPA; 1; 4	SPA; 2; 13†	SPA; 3; 2	MIS; 1; 4	MIS; 2; 4	MIS; 3; 2	HUN; 1; 1	HUN; 2; 3	HUN; 3; 4	LEC; 1; 3	LEC; 2; 4	LEC; 3; 1	HOC; 1 WD	HOC; 2 WD	HOC; 3 WD	MNZ; 1	MNZ; 2	MNZ; 3	CAT; 1	CAT; 2	CAT; 3	5th	211
