= 2024 Formula Regional Americas Championship =

Motor racing competition

The 2024 Formula Regional Americas Championship was the seventh season of a FIA-sanctioned F3 series across North America, and the fifth season under the Formula Regional moniker after a rebrand in 2020. The series was promoted by SCCA Pro Racing, the professional racing division of the Sports Car Club of America.

2023 F4 US champion Patrick Woods-Toth won the Drivers' Championship with three races to spare in his debut season. His team, Crosslink Kiwi Motorsports - the only multi-car team bar the last round - defended their Teams' Championship title, claiming it in the first race of round five.

== Teams and drivers ==
All drivers competed with Ligier JS F3 cars on Hankook tires. All teams were American-registered. After having used Honda powertrains for all of its history, the series originally planned a switch to using Ligier 1.65-litre V4 ‘Storm’ engines in 2024. This switch, however, did not occur as the series used a Mountune engine based on the previous Honda power unit.

Team	No.	Driver	Rounds
Jensen Global Advisors	1	(Denmark) Theodor Jensen	3
Jensen Global Advisors	1	(United States) Jake Pollack	7
IGY6 Motorsports	3	(Brazil) Bruno Ribeiro	7
IGY6 Motorsports	22	(United States) Hayden Bowlsbey	All
Crosslink Kiwi Motorsports	6	(Canada) Nicole Havrda	All
Crosslink Kiwi Motorsports	14	(United States) Alex Benavitz	1
Crosslink Kiwi Motorsports	24	(United States) Kevin Janzen	1–4, 6–7
Crosslink Kiwi Motorsports	25	(United States) Ricco Shlaimoun	All
Crosslink Kiwi Motorsports	27	(Canada) Patrick Woods-Toth	1–6
Crosslink Kiwi Motorsports	31	(United States) Titus Sherlock	All, NC
Crosslink Kiwi Motorsports	66	(United States) Ryan Shehan	1–4, NC
Crosslink Kiwi Motorsports	73	(United States) Landan Matriano Lim	All, NC
Crosslink Kiwi Motorsports	02	(United States) Jett Bowling	All, NC
DD Autosport	11	(United States) Cole Kleck	1, 7
Speed Factory	17	(United States) Justin Garat	1–5
Toney Driver Development	38	(United States) Hailie Deegan	7
Toney Driver Development	80	(United States) Brady Golan	7
Velox USA	55	(Chile) Nicolás Ambiado	1–5, 7
Atlantic Racing Team	77	(Canada) James Lawley	All
Momentum Motorsports	07	(United States) Anthony Autiello	1, 3, 6–7

- Oliver Westling was announced to be staying with Jensen Global Advisors for his sophomore campaign, but did not enter any rounds.

== Race calendar ==
The 2024 calendar was announced on 4 October 2023. The championship did not visit Virginia International Raceway as it did the year before, but instead debuted at Indianapolis Motor Speedway and Canadian Tire Motorsports Park. The number of championship races increased from 18 to 19, as the events at Mid-Ohio and COTA only held two races each. FR Americas also held a non-championship invitational event at Laguna Seca, visiting the Western US for the first time.

Round		Circuit	Date	Support bill	Map of circuit locations
1	R1	(United States) NOLA Motorsports Park, Avondale	13 April	SVRA Sprint Series; Trans-Am Series; TA2 Series; Ligier JS F4 Series	2024 Formula Regional Americas Championship is located in the United States
1	R2	(United States) NOLA Motorsports Park, Avondale	14 April	SVRA Sprint Series; Trans-Am Series; TA2 Series; Ligier JS F4 Series	2024 Formula Regional Americas Championship is located in the United States
1	R3	(United States) NOLA Motorsports Park, Avondale	14 April	SVRA Sprint Series; Trans-Am Series; TA2 Series; Ligier JS F4 Series	2024 Formula Regional Americas Championship is located in the United States
NC	R1	(United States) Laguna Seca, Monterey	4 May	SVRA Sprint Series; Trans-Am Series	2024 Formula Regional Americas Championship is located in the United States
NC	R2	(United States) Laguna Seca, Monterey	5 May	SVRA Sprint Series; Trans-Am Series	2024 Formula Regional Americas Championship is located in the United States
2	R1	(United States) Road America, Elkhart Lake	18 May	Road America SpeedTour; SVRA Sprint Series; Formula 4 United States Championship; Ligier JS F4 Series	2024 Formula Regional Americas Championship is located in the United States
2	R2	(United States) Road America, Elkhart Lake	18 May	Road America SpeedTour; SVRA Sprint Series; Formula 4 United States Championship; Ligier JS F4 Series	2024 Formula Regional Americas Championship is located in the United States
2	R3	(United States) Road America, Elkhart Lake	19 May	Road America SpeedTour; SVRA Sprint Series; Formula 4 United States Championship; Ligier JS F4 Series	2024 Formula Regional Americas Championship is located in the United States
3	R1	(United States) Indianapolis Motor Speedway, Speedway	15 June	Indy SpeedTour; SVRA Sprint Series; Porsche GT3 Cup Trophy USA; Formula First USA	2024 Formula Regional Americas Championship is located in the United States
3	R2	(United States) Indianapolis Motor Speedway, Speedway	16 June	Indy SpeedTour; SVRA Sprint Series; Porsche GT3 Cup Trophy USA; Formula First USA	2024 Formula Regional Americas Championship is located in the United States
3	R3	(United States) Indianapolis Motor Speedway, Speedway	16 June	Indy SpeedTour; SVRA Sprint Series; Porsche GT3 Cup Trophy USA; Formula First USA	2024 Formula Regional Americas Championship is located in the United States
4	R1	(United States) Mid-Ohio Sports Car Course, Lexington	22 June	SVRA Sprint Series; Formula 4 United States Championship	2024 Formula Regional Americas Championship is located in the United States
4	R2	(United States) Mid-Ohio Sports Car Course, Lexington	23 June	SVRA Sprint Series; Formula 4 United States Championship	2024 Formula Regional Americas Championship is located in the United States
5	R1	(United States) New Jersey Motorsports Park, Millville	27 July	SVRA Sprint Series; Atlantic Championship; Formula 4 United States Championship; Ligier JS F4 Series	2024 Formula Regional Americas Championship is located in the United States
5	R2	(United States) New Jersey Motorsports Park, Millville	28 July	SVRA Sprint Series; Atlantic Championship; Formula 4 United States Championship; Ligier JS F4 Series	2024 Formula Regional Americas Championship is located in the United States
5	R3	(United States) New Jersey Motorsports Park, Millville	28 July	SVRA Sprint Series; Atlantic Championship; Formula 4 United States Championship; Ligier JS F4 Series	2024 Formula Regional Americas Championship is located in the United States
6	R1	(Canada) Canadian Tire Motorsports Park, Bowmanville	30 August	Nascar Canada Series; Trans-Am Series; TA2 Series; Formula 4 United States Championship	2024 Formula Regional Americas Championship is located in the United States
6	R2	(Canada) Canadian Tire Motorsports Park, Bowmanville	31 August	Nascar Canada Series; Trans-Am Series; TA2 Series; Formula 4 United States Championship	2024 Formula Regional Americas Championship is located in the United States
6	R3	(Canada) Canadian Tire Motorsports Park, Bowmanville	1 September	Nascar Canada Series; Trans-Am Series; TA2 Series; Formula 4 United States Championship	2024 Formula Regional Americas Championship is located in the United States
7	R1	(United States) Circuit of the Americas, Austin	1 November	SVRA Sprint Series; Formula 4 United States Championship	2024 Formula Regional Americas Championship is located in the United States
7	R2	(United States) Circuit of the Americas, Austin	2 November	SVRA Sprint Series; Formula 4 United States Championship	2024 Formula Regional Americas Championship is located in the United States

== Race results ==
Round		Circuit	Pole position	Fastest lap	Winning driver	Winning team
1	R1	(United States) NOLA Motorsports Park	(Canada) Patrick Woods-Toth	(United States) Cole Kleck	(United States) Cole Kleck	DD Autosport
1	R2	(United States) NOLA Motorsports Park		(United States) Ryan Shehan	(Canada) Patrick Woods-Toth	Crosslink Kiwi Motorsports
1	R3	(United States) NOLA Motorsports Park		(Canada) Patrick Woods-Toth	(United States) Ryan Shehan	Crosslink Kiwi Motorsports
NC	R1	(United States) Laguna Seca	(United States) Titus Sherlock	no starters		
NC	R2	(United States) Laguna Seca	(United States) Jett Bowling	(United States) Ryan Shehan	(United States) Titus Sherlock	Crosslink Kiwi Motorsports
2	R1	(United States) Road America	(Canada) Patrick Woods-Toth	(Canada) Patrick Woods-Toth	(Canada) Patrick Woods-Toth	Crosslink Kiwi Motorsports
2	R2	(United States) Road America		(United States) Titus Sherlock	(United States) Titus Sherlock	Crosslink Kiwi Motorsports
2	R3	(United States) Road America		(United States) Titus Sherlock	(United States) Titus Sherlock	Crosslink Kiwi Motorsports
3	R1	(United States) Indianapolis Motor Speedway	(Canada) Patrick Woods-Toth	(Canada) Patrick Woods-Toth	(Canada) Patrick Woods-Toth	Crosslink Kiwi Motorsports
3	R2	(United States) Indianapolis Motor Speedway		(Canada) Patrick Woods-Toth	(United States) Ryan Shehan	Crosslink Kiwi Motorsports
3	R3	(United States) Indianapolis Motor Speedway		(Canada) Patrick Woods-Toth	(Canada) Patrick Woods-Toth	Crosslink Kiwi Motorsports
4	R1	(United States) Mid-Ohio Sports Car Course	(Canada) Patrick Woods-Toth	(Chile) Nicolás Ambiado	(United States) Ryan Shehan	Crosslink Kiwi Motorsports
4	R2	(United States) Mid-Ohio Sports Car Course		(Canada) Patrick Woods-Toth	(United States) Ryan Shehan	Crosslink Kiwi Motorsports
5	R1	(United States) New Jersey Motorsports Park	(Canada) Patrick Woods-Toth	(Chile) Nicolás Ambiado	(United States) Titus Sherlock	Crosslink Kiwi Motorsports
5	R2	(United States) New Jersey Motorsports Park		(Chile) Nicolás Ambiado	(Chile) Nicolás Ambiado	Velox USA
5	R3	(United States) New Jersey Motorsports Park		(Chile) Nicolás Ambiado	(Canada) Patrick Woods-Toth	Crosslink Kiwi Motorsports
6	R1	(Canada) Canadian Tire Motorsports Park	(Canada) Patrick Woods-Toth	(Canada) Patrick Woods-Toth	(Canada) Patrick Woods-Toth	Crosslink Kiwi Motorsports
6	R2	(Canada) Canadian Tire Motorsports Park		(Canada) Patrick Woods-Toth	(Canada) Patrick Woods-Toth	Crosslink Kiwi Motorsports
6	R3	(Canada) Canadian Tire Motorsports Park		(Canada) Patrick Woods-Toth	(Canada) Patrick Woods-Toth	Crosslink Kiwi Motorsports
7	R1	(United States) Circuit of the Americas	(United States) Titus Sherlock	(United States) Titus Sherlock	(United States) Titus Sherlock	Crosslink Kiwi Motorsports
7	R2	(United States) Circuit of the Americas		(Brazil) Bruno Ribeiro	(Brazil) Bruno Ribeiro	IGY6 Motorsports

== Season report ==
=== First half ===
The season opener at NOLA Motorsports Park attracted 15 cars, a number last reached in 2020, and Crosslink Kiwi’s Patrick Woods-Toth took pole position for the first race. DD Autosport’s Cole Kleck started fourth, but rose to second through the first five corners to take the lead by turn six. Two cars stopping on track then caused a stoppage, and Kleck led Woods-Toth and Velox USA’s Nicolás Ambiado home after the restart. Race two started with Kleck in first, before Crosslink Kiwi’s Titus Sherlock took the lead. He then made a mistake and dropped down the order, before another red flag came out. Woods-Toth got past Kleck on the restart and won, with IGY6’s Hayden Bowlsbey third. Race three saw Crosslink Kiwi’s Ryan Shehan take a lights-to-flag victory as Bowlsbey, Kleck, Woods-Toth and his teammate Jett Bowling took turns battling for the positions behind. That brought no new faces to the podium, as Woods-Toth and Kleck came out on top in the end. This handed the Canadian a narrow three-point championship lead over Kleck.

Four drivers, all representing Crosslink Kiwi, participated in the non-championship invitational round at Laguna Seca. This event was part of the SVRA Sprint Series, featuring competitors from various single-seater classes. Two qualifying sessions determined the grid for the two races, with Sherlock and Bowling each securing a pole position. Due to worsening weather conditions before the first race, the four Formula Regional drivers opted out to avoid potential crashes and budget losses. The weather improved for the second race, where Bowling immediately lost the lead to Sherlock. The latter then extended his advantage while Bowling spun while trying to lap slower competitors, allowing Shehan to overtake him. Landan Matriano Lim, trailing by an additional ten seconds, completed the Formula Regional quartet.

The championship resumed at Road America, where Woods-Toth secured pole position once more. He maintained his lead against an initial challenge from Sherlock, who later fell to third behind Ambiado. Sherlock reclaimed second place after three laps, but by that point, Woods-Toth had already built a lead, which he then maintained to win. In race two, the competition between Woods-Toth and Sherlock for the victory intensified, with Sherlock emerging as the leader after five laps of duelling. A subsequent off-track excursion forced Woods-Toth to pit. He rejoined a lap down, leaving Sherlock to finish ahead of teammates Shehan and Nicole Havrda. In the third race, Sherlock started from pole and held off Shehan at the start and again following a mid-race restart, securing another victory with Havrda in third place. Woods-Toth, who started third, spun and retired on lap seven. Only half points were awarded for race three, reducing the impact of his non-finish, but he still lost his championship lead to Shehan, who now led by three points.

In round four of the series, the competition marked its inaugural appearance at IMS. Woods-Toth secured pole position once again, with Shehan closely trailing for most of the first race but unable to mount a successful challenge, allowing Woods-Toth to claim his third victory of the season. Theodor Jensen, debuting for Jensen GA, finished in third place. The second race featured the same front row, but Sherlock, starting from third, overtook Shehan early on to move into second place. He later took the lead during a mid-race restart after Woods-Toth was spun around by Shehan. A mechanical issue for Sherlock allowed Shehan to claim victory, leading Bowling and Havrda. In race three, Woods-Toth managed to fend off Shehan before the race was interrupted by a red flag following a crash involving Crosslink Kiwi teammates Lim and Ricco Shlaimoun. With only seven laps completed after the restart, half points were awarded, with Woods-Toth winning ahead of Shehan and Bowling. This preserved Shehan's three-point championship lead.

=== Second half ===
The second half of the season commenced with a double-header at Mid-Ohio. During practice, Sherlock experienced a brake failure that resulted in hospitalisation and his subsequent withdrawal from the weekend's races. Woods-Toth secured pole position for the first race, but Shehan quickly overtook him at the start and maintained the lead for the entirety of the race. Despite Woods-Toth closing the gap, he was unable to mount a challenge. Ambiado held third place until mechanical issues forced his retirement, allowing Bowling to claim the spot. In the second race, Ambiado started from pole, but Shehan once again demonstrated superior pace at the start, taking the lead and replicating his performance to complete a double victory. Woods-Toth finished third, leaving him 23.5 points behind Shehan in the standings.

Ahead of the fifth round at New Jersey Motorsports Park, championship leader Shehan announced his withdrawal from the series due to financial constraints. During qualifying, Woods-Toth secured pole position, but in the first race, Sherlock overtook him at the start. The race remained closely contested, with Ambiado challenging Woods-Toth for second place. On the final lap, Ambiado overtook Woods-Toth to claim second. In race two, Ambiado started from pole, while Sherlock made an impressive start from fourth, passing Bowling and Woods-Toth to secure second place. Ambiado dominated the race, winning by over ten seconds, with the top three positions unchanged. The third race saw Ambiado again start on pole, but Woods-Toth had the best start, taking the lead. Sherlock retired after he got caught between Woods-Toth and Bowlsbey and made contact. Despite persistent pressure from Ambiado, Woods-Toth held on to win, followed by Ambiado and Bowling, regaining his championship lead by 31.5 points over the absent Shehan.

Round six saw the series host its inaugural event outside the United States at the Canadian Tire Motorsports Park. Woods-Toth secured pole position for the opening race and successfully defended his lead from Sherlock at both the start and a mid-race restart following a caution, ultimately claiming victory. Bowling completed the podium in third, with the top five drivers finishing in their starting order. In the second race, the podium remained unchanged, as Sherlock dominated to take an unchallenged win, securing the drivers’ championship on home soil. The third race saw Woods-Toth on pole again, with Sherlock pressuring him early on. Bowlsbey overtook Bowling for third and joined the battle for the lead, but a mistake for Sherlock dropped him down the order. Woods-Toth controlled the rest of the race to take a third win, while Bowling reclaimed second from Bowlsbey at the final corner. Woods-Toth’s triple win saw him extend his championship lead to 106.5 points, with four drivers still in contention for second place.

Champion Woods-Toth elected not to enter the final two races at COTA. Sherlock secured pole position and maintained his lead at the start of the first race. Brady Golan, debuting with Toney Driver Development, initially took second place but was soon overtaken by returnee Kleck. Golan then retired, promoting Bowling to third who then took second off Kleck. With more than half the race run under yellow flag conditions, only half points were awarded. In the second race, held in the wet, Golan and Sherlock contested the lead before Bruno Ribeiro of IGY6 Motorsports overtook both within two laps, claiming his first career victory in just his second race. Golan finished second, and Havrda secured third. With Sherlock sixth and Bowling retiring, Shehan maintained second place in the championship standings despite having missed eight races.

In the 17 races he contested, Woods-Toth secured eight victories and achieved six additional podium finishes, clinching his second consecutive junior single-seater championship. The season's narrative was marked by the abrupt withdrawal of his primary rival, Shehan, who exited the competition after a streak of seven consecutive top-two finishes had briefly propelled him into the championship lead at Mid-Ohio. With Shehan’s departure, Woods-Toth faced minimal opposition in the remaining rounds, as the next closest challenger trailed by nearly 80 points. Off the track, the championship faced a significant setback with the loss of its Honda title sponsorship, which also eliminated the $600,000 scholarship for the champion—a factor cited in Shehan’s decision to conclude his season prematurely.

== Championship standings ==
Points were awarded as follows:

Position	**1st**	**2nd**	**3rd**	**4th**	**5th**	**6th**	**7th**	**8th**	**9th**	**10th**
Points	25	18	15	12	10	8	6	4	2	1

=== Drivers' standings ===
Pos	Driver	NOL (United States)			LAG (United States)		ROA (United States)			IMS (United States)			MOH (United States)		NJM (United States)			MOS (Canada)			COA (United States)		Pts
Pos	Driver	R1	R2	R3	NC		R1	R2	R3 (Note: Half points were awarded as less than 50% of the race were completed under green flag conditions.)	R1	R2	R3 (Note: Half points were awarded in the third race at Indianapolis as less than 50% of the scheduled race duration was completed.)	R1	R2	R1	R2	R3	R1	R2	R3	R1	R2	Pts
1	(Canada) Patrick Woods-Toth	**2**	1	2			**1**	12†	Ret	**1**	6	1	**2**	3	**3**	3	1	**1**	1	1			294.5
2	(United States) Ryan Shehan	5	4	1	DNS	2	4	2	2	2	1	2	1	1									188
3	(United States) Jett Bowling	Ret	5	5	DNS	**3**	Ret	6	Ret	4	2	3	3	5	4	4	3	3	3	2	2	Ret	186.5
4	(United States) Titus Sherlock	4	11	4	**DNS**	1	2	1	1	12	Ret	6	WD	WD	1	2	Ret	2	2	9	**1**	6	185
5	(Chile) Nicolás Ambiado	3	10	DNS			3	4	7	5	9	7	Ret	2	2	1	2				8	4	154
6	(Canada) Nicole Havrda	7	6	12†			5	3	3	8	3	4	6	6	Ret	7	8	7	5	6	7	3	139.5
7	(United States) Hayden Bowlsbey	6	3	Ret			7	5	6	Ret	5	12†	4	4	5	6	4	6	9	3	5	12	137
8	(United States) Landan Matriano Lim	Ret	13	7	DNS	4	10	8	5	7	11	Ret	7	Ret	6	5	5	4	DNS	4	10	8	84.5
9	(Canada) James Lawley	11	7	10			8	10	10	Ret	Ret	8	9	7	8	8	6	5	4	5	6	5	84.5
10	(United States) Cole Kleck	1	2	3																	3	7	71.5
11	(United States) Justin Garat	8	8	6			6	7	4	6	7	11†	5	9	WD	WD	WD						62
12	(United States) Ricco Shlaimoun	9	Ret	8			11	9	8	9	8	Ret	8	8	7	9	7	10	6	7	9	Ret	54
13	(Denmark) Theodor Jensen									3	4	5											32
14	(Brazil) Bruno Ribeiro																				4	1	31
15	(United States) Kevin Janzen	Ret	Ret	9			9	11	9	11	Ret	9	10	10				8	7	8	12	13†	22
16	(United States) Brady Golan																				Ret	2	18
17	(United States) Anthony Autiello	10	9	11						10	10	10						9	8	Ret	13	11	11.5
18	(United States) Jake Pollack																				Ret	9	2
19	(United States) Hailie Deegan																				11	10	1
—	(United States) Alex Benavitz	Ret	Ret	DNS																			0
Pos	Driver	R1	R2	R3	NC		R1	R2	R3	R1	R2	R3	R1	R2	R1	R2	R3	R1	R2	R3	R1	R2	Pts
Pos	Driver	NOL (United States)			LAG (United States)		ROA (United States)			IMS (United States)			MOH (United States)		NJM (United States)			MOS (Canada)			COA (United States)		Pts

Colour	Result
Gold	Winner
Silver	Second place
Bronze	Third place
Green	Points classification
Blue	Non-points classification
Blue	Non-classified finish (NC)
Purple	Retired, not classified (Ret)
Red	Did not qualify (DNQ)
Red	Did not pre-qualify (DNPQ)
Black	Disqualified (DSQ)
White	Did not start (DNS)
White	Withdrew (WD)
White	Race cancelled (C)
Blank	Did not practice (DNP)
Blank	Did not arrive (DNA)
Blank	Excluded (EX)

**Bold** – Pole

Italics – Fastest Lap

† — Did not finish, but classified

=== Teams' standings ===
Only a teams' two best-finishing cars are eligible for teams' championship points.

Pos	Driver	NOL (United States)			LAG (United States)		ROA (United States)			IMS (United States)			MOH (United States)		NJM (United States)			MOS (Canada)			COA (United States)		Pts
Pos	Driver	R1	R2	R3	NC		R1	R2	R3	R1	R2	R3	R1	R2	R1	R2	R3	R1	R2	R3	R1	R2	Pts
1	Crosslink Kiwi Motorsports	2	1	1	DNS	1	1	1	1	1	1	1	1	1	1	2	1	1	1	1	1	3	694.5
1	Crosslink Kiwi Motorsports	4	4	2	DNS	2	2	2	2	2	2	2	2	3	3	3	3	2	2	2	2	6	694.5
2	IGY6 Motorsports	6	3	Ret			7	5	6	Ret	5	12†	4	4	5	6	4	6	9	3	4	1	168
2	IGY6 Motorsports																				5	12	168
3	Velox USA	3	10	DNS			3	4	7	5	9	7	Ret	2	2	1	2				8	4	154
4	Atlantic Racing Team	11	7	10			8	10	10	Ret	Ret	8	9	7	8	8	6	5	4	5	6	5	84.5
5	DD Autosport	1	2	3																	3	7	71.5
6	Speed Factory	8	8	6			6	7	4	6	7	11†	5	9	WD	WD	WD						62
7	Jensen Global Advisors									3	4	6									Ret	9	34
8	Toney Driver Development																				11	2	19
8	Toney Driver Development																				Ret	10	19
9	Momentum Motorsports	10	9	11						10	10	10						9	8	Ret	13	11	11.5
Pos	Driver	R1	R2	R3	NC		R1	R2	R3	R1	R2	R3	R1	R2	R1	R2	R3	R1	R2	R3	R1	R2	Pts
Pos	Driver	NOL (United States)			LAG (United States)		ROA (United States)			IMS (United States)			MOH (United States)		NJM (United States)			MOS (Canada)			COA (United States)		Pts
