= Titus Sherlock =

American racing driver (born 2004)

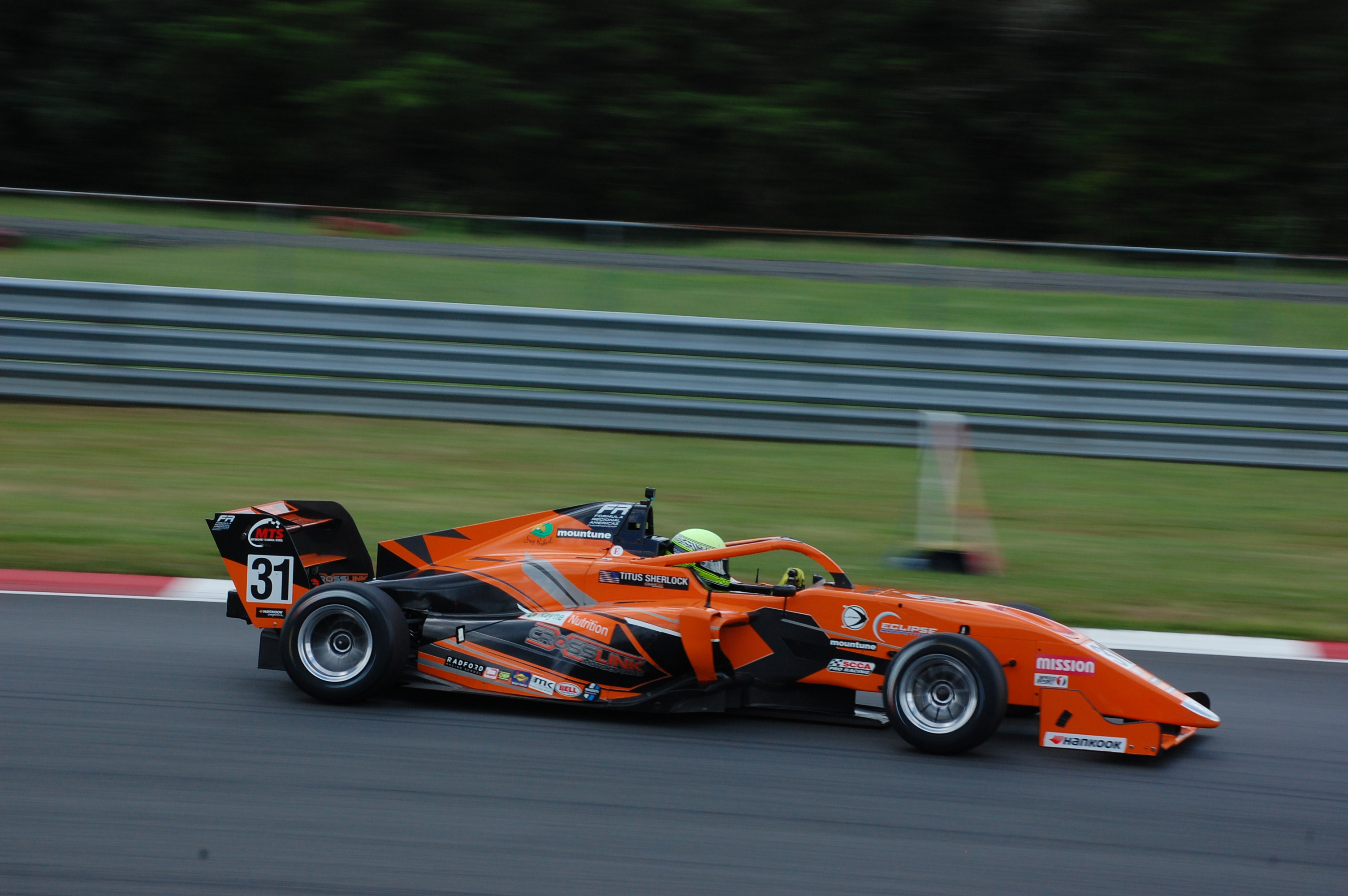
- Sherlock at New Jersey Motorsports Park in 2025
- Nationality: (United States) American
- Born: October 13, 2004 (age 22) San Diego, California, United States

Formula Regional Americas Championship career
- Debut season: 2024
- Current team: Crosslink Motorsports
- Categorisation: FIA Silver
- Car number: 31
- Starts: 18 (19 entries)
- Wins: 4
- Podiums: 9
- Poles: 1
- Fastest laps: 3
- Best finish: 1st in 2025

Previous series
- 2025 2022–23 2022 2021: USF Pro 2000 Championship; F4 United States Championship; USF Juniors; Lucas Oil Race School

Titus Sherlock (born October 13, 2004) is an American racing driver who is competing in the 2025 Formula Regional Americas Championship driving for Crosslink Motorsports. He previously competed in the 2025 USF Pro 2000 Championship driving for Turn 3 Motorsport.

== Career ==
=== USF Juniors ===
After competing in the Lucas Oil Race School in 2021, Sherlock moved to the brand new USF Juniors series for their inaugural season in 2022. He would contest the season full-time for Crosslink Kiwi Motorsports. Sherlock's only full-time teammate was Jeremy Fairbairn. Sherlock had a good start to the season with two top-fives and a podium in race 2 at Virginia International Raceway. However, he had mixed results for the rest of the season and would finish eighth in the championship, behind his teammate Fairbairn who came in sixth.

=== Formula 4 United States Championship ===
==== 2022 ====
Sherlock made his series debut in the final round of the 2022 Formula 4 United States Championship at the Circuit of the Americas driving for Crosslink/Kiwi Motorsport. In the three races he contested, Sherlock had a best result of sixth in race two.

==== 2023 ====
Sherlock competed in the series full-time in 2023, continuing his partnership with Crosslink/Kiwi Motorsport. He started his season with a maiden Formula 4 podium – a third place – in the first race of the first round at NOLA Motorsports Park. His season was consistent, only dropping out of the points once, with a twelfth place at the first race of the third round at Mid-Ohio Sports Car Course. Sherlock got his maiden car racing and Formula 4 win in dramatic fashion at the first race of the fourth round at New Jersey Motorsports Park, where in inherited the win after both drivers ahead of him – Alexander Berg and Patrick Woods-Toth – received penalties for pushing drivers off track. After his maiden win also got another podium – a second place – at the third race of the round.

Sherlock's second win came at the first race of the final round at Circuit of the Americas, where he also got his maiden Formula 4 pole position. With these results, he finished runner-up in the drivers championship with 181 points, behind dominant teammate Woods-Toth. Sherlock got two wins, one pole position, two fastest laps and four podiums throughout the season.

=== Formula Regional ===
==== 2024 ====
Sherlock stepped up to Formula Regional machinery in 2024, making his international racing debut in the 2024 Formula Regional Oceania Championship, a winter series held in New Zealand. He contested the series full-time driving for Kiwi Motorsport with Patrick Woods-Toth, Jett Bowling and Jake Bonilla being his teammates. He had a difficult campaign, only getting a highest finish of eighth, which he achieved three times, alongside three retirements across the fifteen races. Sherlock finished the drivers championship in fourteenth with 105 points.

For his main campaign of the season, Sherlock competed in the Formula Regional Americas Championship with Crosslink Kiwi Motorsport. The first round at NOLA Motorsports Park went well, coming fourth in the first and third race, he got his first pole position and win a round later at the non-championship races at Laguna Seca, getting the pole position in the first race but being unable to start and the race, and bagging a win at the second race.

At the third round in Road America, Sherlock got his first championship podium in the first race with a second place and two wins the next two races, getting his first Formula Regional win that counted to the championship.

Sherlock struggled in the next two rounds, coming twelfth in the first race at Indianapolis Motor Speedway, then retiring in the second race but came sixth in the third race. He would withdraw from the Mid-Ohio Sports Car Course races altogether but would bounce back at the New Jersey Motorsports Park, bagging another win then a second place before finishing off the round with an unfortunate retirement.

Sherlock would bag two more second places at the only international and penultimate round of the series at Canadian Tire Motorsport Park. At the final round of the championship at the Circuit of the Americas, he got his first pole position, fastest lap and race win all in one race. Sherlock came sixth in the final race of his campaign and finished the championship fourth in the standings with 185 points.

==== 2025 ====
With the newly rebranded Crosslink Motorsports, Sherlock was retained for his second season in the Formula Regional Americas Championship.

=== USF Pro 2000 Championship ===
Sherlock would return on the Road to Indy pathway in the first round of the 2025 USF Pro 2000 Championship with Turn 3 Motorsport, retiring from the first race and coming fifteenth in the next one.

== Racing record ==
=== Racing career summary ===
Season	Series	Team	Races	Wins	Poles	F/Laps	Podiums	Points	Position
2022	USF Juniors	Crosslink/Kiwi Motorsport	16	0	0	0	1	178	8th
2022	Formula 4 United States Championship	Crosslink/Kiwi Motorsport	3	0	0	0	0	12	22nd
2023	Formula 4 United States Championship	Crosslink/Kiwi Motorsport	18	2	1	2	4	181	**2nd**
2024	Formula Regional Oceania Championship	Kiwi Motorsport	15	0	0	0	0	105	14th
2024	Formula Regional Americas Championship	Crosslink Kiwi Motorsports	18	4	1	3	8	185	4th
2025	USF Pro 2000 Championship	Turn 3 Motorsport	2	0	0	0	0	7	26th
2025	Formula Regional Americas Championship	Crosslink Motorsports	20	8	1	2	13	291.5	**1st**
2026	IMSA VP Racing SportsCar Challenge - LMP3	Toney Driver Development	3	1	0	0	3	990	17th
2026	Lamborghini Super Trofeo Asia - Pro	Lamborghini Bundang by Racegraph	12	2	1	2	10	119	4th

* Season still in progress.

=== American open-wheel racing results ===
==== USF Juniors ====
(key) (Races in bold indicate pole position) (Races in italics indicate fastest lap) (Races with * indicate most race laps led)

Year	Team	1	2	3	4	5	6	7	8	9	10	11	12	13	14	15	16	17	Rank	Points
2022	Crosslink Kiwi Motorsports	OIR; 1; 11	OIR; 2; 5	OIR; 3 C†	ALA; 1; 16	ALA; 2; 9	VIR; 1; 5	VIR; 2; 2	VIR; 3; 6	MOH; 1; 12	MOH; 2; 16	MOH; 3; 10	ROA; 1; 6	ROA; 2; 15	ROA; 3; 15	COA; 1; 8	COA; 2; 18	COA; 3; 12	8th	178

† Race was cancelled due to inclement weather.

==== USF Pro 2000 Championship ====
(key) (Races in bold indicate pole position) (Races in italics indicate fastest lap)

Year	Team	1	2	3	4	5	6	7	8	9	10	11	12	13	14	15	16	17	18	Position	Points
2025	Turn 3 Motorsport	STP; 1; 22	STP; 2; 15	LOU; 1	LOU; 2	LOU; 3	IMS; 1	IMS; 2	IMS; 3	IRP	ROA; 1	ROA; 2	ROA; 3	MOH; 1	MOH; 2	TOR; 1	TOR; 2	POR; 1	POR; 2	26th	7

* Season still in progress.

=== Complete Formula 4 United States Championship results ===
(key) (Races in bold indicate pole position) (Races in italics indicate fastest lap)

Year	Team	1	2	3	4	5	6	7	8	9	10	11	12	13	14	15	16	17	18	Pos	Points
2022	Crosslink/Kiwi Motorsport	NOL; 1	NOL; 2	NOL; 3	ROA; 1	ROA; 2	ROA; 3	MOH; 1	MOH; 2	MOH; 3	NJM; 1	NJM; 2	NJM; 3	VIR; 1	VIR; 2	VIR; 3	COA; 1 Ret	COA; 2; 6	COA; 3; 8	22nd	12
2023	Crosslink/Kiwi Motorsport	NOL; 1; 3	NOL; 2; 7	NOL; 3; 10	ROA; 1; 7	ROA; 2; 4	ROA; 3; 5	MOH; 1; 12	MOH; 2; 4	MOH; 3; 7	NJM; 1; 1	NJM; 2; 4	NJM; 3; 2	VIR; 1; 6	VIR; 2; 4	VIR; 3; 5	**COA**; **1**; 1	COA; 2; 5	COA; 3; 8	2nd	181

=== Complete Formula Regional Oceania Championship results ===
(key) (Races in bold indicate pole position) (Races in italics indicate fastest lap)

Year	Team	1	2	3	4	5	6	7	8	9	10	11	12	13	14	15	DC	Points
2024	Kiwi Motorsport	TAU; 1; 11	TAU; 2 Ret	TAU; 3; 8	MAN; 1; 13	MAN; 2; 8	MAN; 3; 8	HMP; 1; 11	HMP; 2; 13	HMP; 3; 9	RUA; 1 Ret	RUA; 2; 12	RUA; 3; 11	HIG; 1; 17	HIG; 2; 14	HIG; 3 Ret	14th	105

=== Complete Formula Regional Americas Championship results ===
(key) (Races in bold indicate pole position) (Races in italics indicate fastest lap)

Year	Team	1	2	3	4	5	6	7	8	9	10	11	12	13	14	15	16	17	18	19	20	21	22	DC	Points
2024	Crosslink Kiwi Motorsport	NOL; 1; 4	NOL; 2; 11	NOL; 3; 4	**LAG**; **1** DNS	LAG; 2; 1	ROA; 1; 2	ROA; 2; 1	ROA; 3; 1	IMS; 1; 12	IMS; 2 Ret	IMS; 3; 6	MOH; 1 WD	MOH; 2 WD	NJM; 1; 1	NJM; 2; 2	NJM; 3 Ret	MOS; 1; 2	MOS; 2; 2	MOS; 3; 9	**COT**; **1**; 1	COT; 2; 6		4th	185
2025	Crosslink Motorsports	NOL; 1; 1	NOL; 2 Ret	NOL; 3; 4	**ROA**; **1**; 1	ROA; 2; 1	ROA; 3; 1	IMS; 1 C	IMS; 2 Ret	IMS; 3; 4	MOH; 1; 3	MOH; 2; 4	MOH; 3 Ret	NJM; 1; 3	NJM; 2; 4	NJM; 3 C	MOS; 1; 1	MOS; 2; 1	MOS; 3; 1	VIR; 1; 3	VIR; 2; 2	ALA; 2; 2	ALA; 2; 1	1st	291.5
