= Patrick Woods-Toth =

Canadian racing driver

- Nationality: (Canada) Canadian
- Born: 30 October 2003 (age 23) Saint-Lazare, Quebec, Canada

Formula Regional Americas Championship career
- Debut season: 2024
- Current team: Crosslink Kiwi Motorsport
- Starts: 17 (17 entries)
- Wins: 8
- Podiums: 14
- Poles: 6
- Fastest laps: 9
- Best finish: 1st in 2024

Championship titles
- 2023 2024: Formula 4 United States Championship; Formula Regional Americas Championship
- Statistics up to date as of 22 November 2024.

Patrick Woods-Toth (born 30 October 2003) is a Canadian racing driver. He was the 2023 Formula 4 United States Championship champion, and the following year became the 2024 Formula Regional Americas champion, driving for Crosslink Kiwi Motorsport.

== Career ==
=== Early career and karting ===
After losing his parents at a young age, Woods-Toth was raised by his grandparents and developed his passion for motorsports from his grandfather, with whom he'd drive ATVs and snowmobiles for a number of years. At the age of fourteen, Woods-Toth joined the Ron Fellows Karting Championship, and he would go onto win the 2022 edition of the championship alongside the Canadian Karting Championship and the Canadian Open Championship. At the conclusion of 2022, Woods-Toth attended the Radford Racing School in Arizona thanks to the F4 US Scholarship Award, which he earned from his performances in Fellows' local karting championship.

=== Formula 4 United States Championship ===
In 2023, Woods-Toth graduated to Formula 4 competition, competing in the Formula 4 United States Championship with Crosslink Kiwi Motorsport. In his debut race, he claimed a podium finish, falling short to race-winner Carl Bennett. During the second race meeting, at Road America, he claimed his first career F4 race victory. He would claim three more over the course of the season, adding another during the Road America weekend alongside one each at Mid-Ohio and Circuit of the Americas. Across the eighteen-race season, Woods-Toth stood on the podium fourteen times, culminating in him earning the championship title at season's end. Alongside his championship victory, Woods-Toth earned a scholarship to compete in the Formula Regional Americas Championship in 2024.

=== Formula Regional Oceania Championship ===
In January 2024, Woods-Toth traveled to New Zealand to take part in the Formula Regional Oceania Championship, competing for his 2023 F4 team Kiwi Motorsport. Over the course of the 15-race season, he claimed four podium finishes and a season-high second during the reverse grid race at Highlands Motorsport Park, finishing third in the championship and claiming rookie of the year honors.

=== Formula Regional Americas Championship ===
Following his 2023 Formula 4 title, Woods-Toth stepped up to the Formula Regional Americas Championship in 2024, joining Crosslink Kiwi Motorsport. He claimed pole in his debut race at NOLA Motorsports Park, before finishing runner-up in round one to Cole Kleck. In race two of the weekend, he claimed his first career FR Americas victory. Later on in the season, Woods-Toth clinched the championship title after the second of three races at Canadian Tire Motorsport Park, in what was ultimately a three race sweep in his native country. Woods-Toth did not appear on the grid at COTA for the final round of the season.

== Personal life ==
Woods-Toth attended John Abbott College, pursuing a degree in engineering during his racing career.

== Racing record ==
=== Racing career summary ===
Season	Series	Team	Races	Wins	Poles	F/Laps	Podiums	Points	Position
2023	Formula 4 United States Championship	Crosslink/Kiwi Motorsport	18	5	1	2	14	263.5	**1st**
2024	Formula Regional Oceania Championship	Kiwi Motorsport	15	0	0	0	4	255	**3rd**
2024	Formula Regional Americas Championship	Crosslink Kiwi Motorsports	17	8	6	9	14	294.5	**1st**

=== Complete Formula 4 United States Championship results ===
(key) (Races in bold indicate pole position) (Races in italics indicate fastest lap)

Year	Team	1	2	3	4	5	6	7	8	9	10	11	12	13	14	15	16	17	18	Pos	Points
2023	Crosslink/Kiwi Motorsport	NOL; 1; 2	NOL; 2; 3	NOL; 3; 3	ROA; 1; 1	ROA; 2; 5	ROA; 3; 1	**MOH**; **1**; 5	MOH; 2; 3	MOH; 3; 1	NJM; 1; 5	NJM; 2; 2	NJM; 3; 3	VIR; 1; 3	VIR; 2; 15	VIR; 3; 3	COA; 1; 3	COA; 2; 3	COA; 3; 1	1st	263.5

=== Complete Formula Regional Oceania Championship results ===
(key) (Races in bold indicate pole position) (Races in italics indicate fastest lap)

Year	Team	1	2	3	4	5	6	7	8	9	10	11	12	13	14	15	DC	Points
2024	Kiwi Motorsport	TAU; 1; 16	TAU; 2; 5	TAU; 3; 9	MAN; 1; 8	MAN; 2; 4	MAN; 3; 6	HMP; 1; 3	HMP; 2; 4	HMP; 3; 6	RUA; 1; 7	RUA; 2; 3	RUA; 3; 3	HIG; 1; 6	HIG; 2; 2	HIG; 3; 9	3rd	255

=== Complete Formula Regional Americas Championship results ===
(key) (Races in bold indicate pole position) (Races in italics indicate fastest lap)

Year	Team	1	2	3	4	5	6	7	8	9	10	11	12	13	14	15	16	17	18	19	DC	Points
2024	Crosslink Kiwi Motorsport	**NOL**; **1**; 2	NOL; 2; 1	NOL; 3; 2	**ROA**; **1**; 1	ROA; 2; 12†	ROA; 3 Ret	**IMS**; **1**; 1	IMS; 2; 6	IMS; 3; 1	**MOH**; **1**; 2	MOH; 2; 3	**NJM**; **1**; 3	NJM; 2; 3	NJM; 3; 1	**MOS**; **1**; 1	MOS; 2; 1	MOS; 3; 1	COT; 1	COT; 2	1st	294.5
