= Michael Costello (racing driver) =

American racing driver (born 2007)

- Nationality: (United States) American
- Born: January 15, 2007 (age 19) Wilkes-Barre, Pennsylvania, U.S.

USF Pro 2000 Championship career
- Debut season: 2025
- Current team: Turn 3 Motorsport
- Car number: 2
- Former teams: Pabst Racing; Jay Howard Driver Development
- Starts: 18
- Wins: 0
- Podiums: 2
- Poles: 0
- Fastest laps: 0
- Best finish: 7th in 2025

Previous series
- 2024 2023: USF2000 Championship; Formula 4 United States Championship

Championship titles
- 0

Michael Costello (born January 15, 2007) is an American racing driver who is set to drive in the USF Pro 2000 Championship for Turn 3 Motorsport.

Costello previously competed in the 2024 USF2000 Championship with Jay Howard Driver Development.

== Career ==
=== Formula 4 United States Championship ===
In 2023, Costello made the step up from karting to open-wheel, debuting in the 2023 Formula 4 United States Championship driving for Jay Howard Driver Development. He would have a successful season with three wins, two poles, and five podiums to finish fifth in the championship.

=== USF2000 Championship ===
For 2024, Costello made the switch to the USF2000 Championship along with Jay Howard Driver Development. He would have an inconsistent first half of the season, but eventually got his first win the series in race one at Portland International Raceway.

=== USF Pro 2000 Championship ===
==== 2025 ====
Costello would climb up the USF Pro Championships ladder and enter the 2025 USF Pro 2000 Championship driving for Pabst Racing.

==== 2026 ====
Costello switched to Turn 3 Motorsport for the 2026 USF Pro 2000 Championship.

== Racing record ==
=== Racing career summary ===
Season	Series	Team	Races	Wins	Poles	F/Laps	Podiums	Points	Position
2023	Formula 4 United States Championship	Jay Howard Driver Development	18	3	2	5	5	148	5th
2024	USF2000 Championship	Jay Howard Driver Development	18	1	0	1	3	218	9th
2025	USF Pro 2000 Championship	Pabst Racing	18	0	0	0	2	211	7th
2026	USF Pro 2000 Championship	Turn 3 Motorsport	10	1	0	1	3	166	13th

* Season still in progress.

=== Complete Formula 4 United States Championship results ===
(key) (Races in bold indicate pole position) (Races in italics indicate fastest lap)

Year	Team	1	2	3	4	5	6	7	8	9	10	11	12	13	14	15	16	17	18	Pos	Points
2023	Jay Howard Driver Development	**NOL**; **1**; 29	NOL; 2; 4	NOL; 3; 2	ROA; 1; 4	ROA; 2; 1	ROA; 3; 14	MOH; 1; 1	MOH; 2; 2	MOH; 3; 6	NJM; 1; 4	NJM; 2; 1	NJM; 3; 4	**VIR**; **1**; 14	VIR; 2; 14	VIR; 3; 17	COA; 1; 7	COA; 2 Ret	COA; 3; 22	5th	148

=== American open-wheel racing results ===
==== USF2000 Championship ====
(key) (Races in bold indicate pole position) (Races in italics indicate fastest lap) (Races with * indicate most race laps led)

Year	Team	1	2	3	4	5	6	7	8	9	10	11	12	13	14	15	16	17	18	Rank	Points
2024	Jay Howard Driver Development	STP; 1; 5	STP; 2; 19	NOL; 1; 17	NOL; 2; 17	NOL; 3; 10	IMS; 1; 9	IMS; 2; 7	IRP; 8	ROA; 1; 8	ROA; 2; 2	MOH; 1; 17	MOH; 2; 2	MOH; 3; 18	TOR; 1; 17	TOR; 2; 10	POR; 1; 1*	POR; 2; 7	POR; 3; 14	9th	218

==== USF Pro 2000 Championship ====
(key) (Races in bold indicate pole position) (Races in italics indicate fastest lap)

Year	Team	1	2	3	4	5	6	7	8	9	10	11	12	13	14	15	16	17	18	Position	Points
2025	Pabst Racing	STP; 1; 3	STP; 2; 21	LOU; 1; 6	LOU; 2; 6	LOU; 3; 6	IMS; 1; 5	IMS; 2; 20	IMS; 3; 3	IRP; 7	ROA; 1; 18	ROA; 2; 18	ROA; 3; 9	MOH; 1; 14	MOH; 2; 6	TOR; 1; 15	TOR; 2; 6	POR; 1; 7	POR; 2; 14	7th	211
2026	Turn 3 Motorsport	ARL; 1; 3	ARL; 2; 7	IMS; 1; 18	IMS; 2; 5	IRP; 1*	ROA; 1; 8	ROA; 2; 12	MOH; 1; 10	MOH; 2; 3	MOH; 3; 13	POR; 1	POR; 2	MAR; 1	MAR; 2	MIL	ROA; 1	ROA; 2	ROA; 3	10th*	166*

* Season still in progress.
