= Nicolás Ambiado =

Chilean racing driver (born 2007)

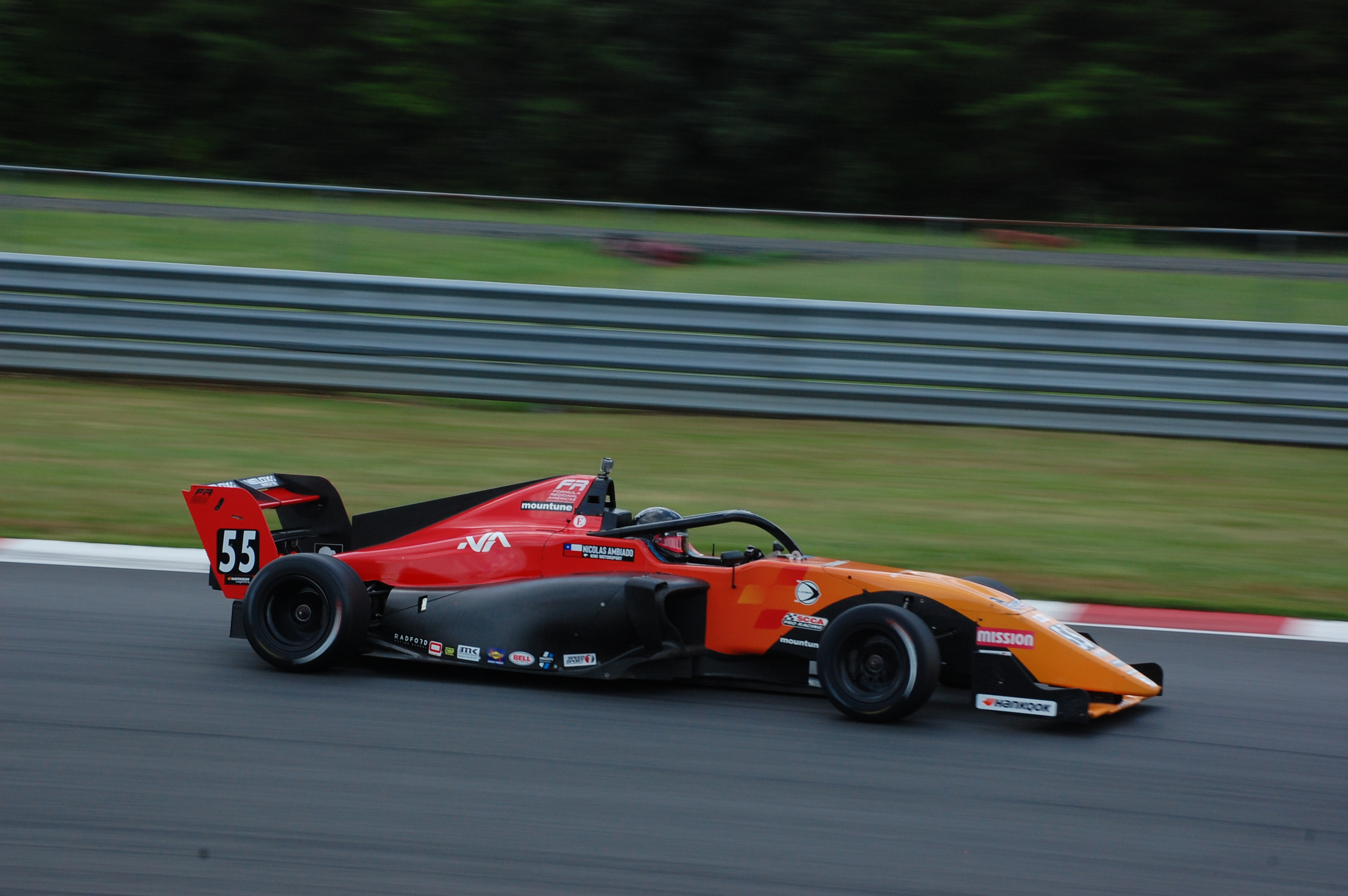
- Ambiado in 2025
- Born: Nicolás Felipe Ambiado Quiñones; 4 November 2007 (age 19); Talagante, Chile
- Nationality: (Chile) Chilean

Nicolás Felipe Ambiado Quiñones (born 4 November 2007) is a Chilean racing driver who last competed in the TCR South America Touring Car Championship for Scuderia URT.

== Career ==
Ambiado was born on 4 November 2007 and began karting at the age of six. In his karting career, he most notably was the 2019 Rotax Max South America champion in the Mini class, and was also voted as the best Chilean driver under 18 at the FIA Americas Awards.

Ambiado made his single-seater debut in early 2023, racing in the Formula Inter series, in which he took two wins on his debut. In the same year, Ambiado also made a one-off appearance in the Formula 4 United States Championship at NOLA for Scuderia Buell. In the three races, Ambiado scored a best result of 13th in race three.

The following year, Ambiado stepped up to single-seaters full-time by joining Velox USA to race in Formula Regional Americas. In his first round in the series at NOLA, Ambiado finished third on debut before taking tenth in race two and not starting race three. In the following round at Road America, Ambiado scored his second podium of the season by finishing third, before taking his third podium two rounds later at Mid-Ohio by finishing second in race two. Ambiado then took his maiden win in single-seaters at New Jersey Motorsports Park and finished second in the other two races of the weekend. After missing the round at Canadian Tire Motorsports Park, Ambiado returned to the series for the finale at Circuit of the Americas, where he secured fifth in points after finishing fourth in race two.

Ambiado returned to the series for 2025, albeit switching to Kiwi Motorsports for his sophomore season, with coaching from Roberto Moreno. Starting off the season at NOLA, Ambiado took pole and won race three, and left the round as the points leader after finishing second in the other two races. Ambiado then lost the points lead at Road America, in which he took a lone podium in race two, before taking his second win of the season in the following round at Indianapolis. The following week at Mid-Ohio, Ambiado finished all three races on the podium, including his third win of the season in race two, and then won race two of the following round at New Jersey Motorsports Park. In the series' only trip abroad in Canada, Ambiado finished second in race one but wasn't able to re-take the points lead after finishing fourth in race two and suffering a turbo issue in race three. At VIR, Ambiado battled mechanical issues yet again, but was able to retain second in points after finishing fourth in race one, before ending the season with a third-place finish at Barber to secure runner-up honors.

== Karting record ==
=== Karting career summary ===
| Season | Series | Team | Position |
|---|---|---|---|
| 2016–17 | Rotax Max Challenge Chile – Micro Max | | 1st |
| 2017 | Rotax Max Challenge Grand Finals – Micro Max | Marco Ambiado Olivare | 14th |
| 2018 | Andrea Margutti Trophy – 60 Mini | Avracing | 19th |
| 2018 | WSK Open Cup – 60 Mini | Parolin Motorsport | NC |
| 2018 | ROK Cup International Final – Mini Rok | Parolin Motorsport | 14th |
| 2019 | Florida Winter Tour – Mini ROK | AM Engines | 24th |
| 2019 | WSK Euro Series – 60 Mini | Avracing | 47th |
| 2019 | Trofeo Delle Industrie – 60 Mini | Avracing | 6th |
| 2019 | Rok Cup Superfinal – Mini Rok | Avracing | 32nd |
| 2019 | WSK Open Cup – 60 Mini | Avracing | 39th |
| 2020 | Florida Winter Tour – Mini ROK | AM Engines | 20th |
| 2020 | Karting European Championship – OK-J | Parolin Motorsport | 32nd |
| 2021 | Karting Academy Trophy | Marco Ambiado | 19th |
| 2021 | WSK Euro Series – OK-J | Parolin Motorsport | 112nd |
| 2021 | Champions of the Future – OK-J | Parolin Motorsport | 111st |
| 2021 | Karting European Championship – OK-J | Parolin Motorsport | NC |
| 2024 | RMC South American Trophy – DD2 | | 1st |
| 2024 | Rotax Max Challenge Grand Finals – DD2 | Marco Ambiado | 63nd |

== Racing record ==
=== Racing career summary ===
| Season | Series | Team | Races | Wins | Poles | F/Laps | Podiums | Points | Position |
|---|---|---|---|---|---|---|---|---|---|
| 2023 | Formula 4 United States Championship | Scuderia Buell | 3 | 0 | 0 | 0 | 0 | 0 | 37th |
| 2024 | Formula Regional Americas Championship | Velox USA | 15 | 1 | 0 | 4 | 6 | 154 | 5th |
| 2025 | Formula Regional Americas Championship | Kiwi Motorsports | 19 | 4 | 1 | 5 | 11 | 250 | **2nd** |
| 2026 | TCR South America Touring Car Championship | Scuderia URT | | | | | | * | * |

=== Complete Formula 4 United States Championship results ===
(key) (Races in bold indicate pole position) (Races in italics indicate fastest lap)

| Year | Team | 1 | 2 | 3 | 4 | 5 | 6 | 7 | 8 | 9 | 10 | 11 | 12 | 13 | 14 | 15 | 16 | 17 | 18 | Pos | Points |
|---|---|---|---|---|---|---|---|---|---|---|---|---|---|---|---|---|---|---|---|---|---|
| 2023 | Scuderia Buell | NOL; 1 Ret | NOL; 2; 17 | NOL; 3; 13 | ROA; 1 | ROA; 2 | ROA; 3 | MOH; 1 | MOH; 2 | MOH; 3 | NJM; 1 | NJM; 2 | NJM; 3 | VIR; 1 | VIR; 2 | VIR; 3 | COA; 1 | COA; 2 | COA; 3 | 37th | 0 |

=== Complete Formula Regional Americas Championship results ===
(key) (Races in bold indicate pole position) (Races in italics indicate fastest lap)

| Year | Team | 1 | 2 | 3 | 4 | 5 | 6 | 7 | 8 | 9 | 10 | 11 | 12 | 13 | 14 | 15 | 16 | 17 | 18 | 19 | 20 | 21 | 22 | DC | Points |
|---|---|---|---|---|---|---|---|---|---|---|---|---|---|---|---|---|---|---|---|---|---|---|---|---|---|
| 2024 | Velox USA | NOL; 1; 3 | NOL; 2; 10 | NOL; 3 DNS | ROA; 1; 3 | ROA; 2; 4 | ROA; 3; 7 | IMS; 1; 5 | IMS; 2; 9 | IMS; 3; 7 | MOH; 1 Ret | MOH; 2; 2 | NJM; 1; 2 | NJM; 2; 1 | NJM; 3; 2 | MOS; 1 | MOS; 2 | MOS; 3 | COT; 1; 8 | COT; 2; 4 | | | | 5th | 154 |
| 2025 | Kiwi Motorsports | **NOL**; **1**; 2 | NOL; 2; 2 | NOL; 3; 1 | ROA; 1; 9 | ROA; 2; 3 | ROA; 3; 11 | IMS; 1 C | IMS; 2; 4 | IMS; 3; 1 | MOH; 1; 2 | MOH; 2; 1 | MOH; 3; 3 | NJM; 1; 5 | NJM; 2; 1 | NJM; 3 C | MOS; 1; 2 | MOS; 2; 4 | MOS; 3; 10 | VIR; 1; 4 | VIR; 2; 11† | ALA; 2 DNS | ALA; 2; 3 | 2nd | 250 |
