= 2024 Formula Regional Oceania Championship =

Motor racing competition

The 2024 Castrol Toyota Formula Regional Oceania Championship was the second season of the Formula Regional Oceania Championship, and the nineteenth running of the premier open-wheel motorsport category formerly known as the Toyota Racing Series, held in New Zealand. It was held over five consecutive weekends in January and February 2024.

For the first time in the history of the championship and its predecessors, the highest placed Australian or Kiwi driver after the first two rounds was awarded the Tasman Cup that had previously been awarded to the winner of the Tasman Series up until 2023. Australian driver Christian Mansell was second overall after the second round at Manfeild, thereby taking this title.

Roman Biliński, driving for M2 Competition, claimed the championship at the penultimate race of the season. Kiwi Motorsport driver Patrick Woods-Toth took the rookie title at the same race.

== Entry list ==
All drivers competed with identical Tatuus FT-60 chassis cars powered by 2.0L turbocharged Toyota engines. The series switched its tyre supplier from Hankook to Pirelli because of a fire at Hankook's factory in Daejeon that caused widespread supply issues. The series supplied all cars with 100% fossil-free fuel, becoming the first Formula Regional championship to take this sustainability step.

Team	No.	Driver	Status	Rounds
M2 Competition	4	(Poland) Roman Biliński		All
M2 Competition	7	(Italy) Nicola Lacorte	R	1–3
M2 Competition	16	(South Korea) Michael Shin		All
M2 Competition	23	(New Zealand) Liam Sceats		All
M2 Competition	27	(United States) Bryce Aron		4–5
M2 Competition	39	(Hong Kong) Gerrard Xie (Note: Xie is a Chinese driver who competed under a Hong Kong licence.)		All
M2 Competition	101	(Australia) Ryder Quinn		5
mtec Motorsport	5	(Brazil) Lucas Fecury		All
mtec Motorsport	6	(Australia) Tommy Smith		1–3
mtec Motorsport	17	(New Zealand) Callum Hedge		5
mtec Motorsport	19	(Australia) Elliott Cleary	R	1–3, 5
mtec Motorsport	48	(New Zealand) Kaden Probst	R	1–4
mtec Motorsport	51	(United States) Jacob Abel		4–5
Kiwi Motorsport	14	(Canada) Patrick Woods-Toth	R	All
Kiwi Motorsport	20	(United States) Jake Bonilla	R	All
Kiwi Motorsport	22	(United States) Jett Bowling	R	All
Kiwi Motorsport	31	(United States) Titus Sherlock	R	All
Giles Motorsport	15	(New Zealand) Kaleb Ngatoa		All
Giles Motorsport	41	(New Zealand) Alex Crosbie	R	All
Giles Motorsport	69	(New Zealand) Sebastian Manson	R	4–5
Giles Motorsport	71	(Australia) Christian Mansell		1–2
Giles Motorsport	739	(United States) Landan Matriano Lim	R	All

Icon	Status
R	Rookie
G	Guest driver

== Race calendar ==
Even before the 2023 season had begun, New Zealand's national motorsport governing body had already announced the 2024 calendar. The championship again consisted of five weekends. The round at Teretonga Park was dropped, instead the series returned to Euromarque Motorsport Park for the first time since 2018.

The 68th running of the New Zealand Grand Prix was held as the final race of the season, at Highlands Motorsport Park.

Round		Circuit	Date	Support bill	Map of circuit locations
1	R1	Taupo International Motorsport Park (Taupō, Waikato)	20 January	Taupo Historic Grand Prix; Historic Touring Cars NZ; Formula Junior NZ; NZ Historic Muscle & Saloon Cars	2024 Formula Regional Oceania Championship is located in New Zealand
1	R2	Taupo International Motorsport Park (Taupō, Waikato)	21 January	Taupo Historic Grand Prix; Historic Touring Cars NZ; Formula Junior NZ; NZ Historic Muscle & Saloon Cars	2024 Formula Regional Oceania Championship is located in New Zealand
1	R3	Taupo International Motorsport Park (Taupō, Waikato)	21 January	Taupo Historic Grand Prix; Historic Touring Cars NZ; Formula Junior NZ; NZ Historic Muscle & Saloon Cars	2024 Formula Regional Oceania Championship is located in New Zealand
2	R1	Manfeild: Circuit Chris Amon (Feilding, Manawatū District)	27 January	New Zealand GT Championship; TGR 86 Series NZ; Super V8 Series; TA2 New Zealand	2024 Formula Regional Oceania Championship is located in New Zealand
2	R2	Manfeild: Circuit Chris Amon (Feilding, Manawatū District)	28 January	New Zealand GT Championship; TGR 86 Series NZ; Super V8 Series; TA2 New Zealand	2024 Formula Regional Oceania Championship is located in New Zealand
2	R3	Manfeild: Circuit Chris Amon (Feilding, Manawatū District)	28 January	New Zealand GT Championship; TGR 86 Series NZ; Super V8 Series; TA2 New Zealand	2024 Formula Regional Oceania Championship is located in New Zealand
3	R1	Hampton Downs Motorsport Park (Hampton Downs, North Waikato)	3 February	New Zealand Porsche Series Championship; GT Racing New Zealand; NZ Formula First Championship; Superkart Drivers Club Series	2024 Formula Regional Oceania Championship is located in New Zealand
3	R2	Hampton Downs Motorsport Park (Hampton Downs, North Waikato)	4 February	New Zealand Porsche Series Championship; GT Racing New Zealand; NZ Formula First Championship; Superkart Drivers Club Series	2024 Formula Regional Oceania Championship is located in New Zealand
3	R3	Hampton Downs Motorsport Park (Hampton Downs, North Waikato)	4 February	New Zealand Porsche Series Championship; GT Racing New Zealand; NZ Formula First Championship; Superkart Drivers Club Series	2024 Formula Regional Oceania Championship is located in New Zealand
4	R1	Euromarque Motorsport Park (Christchurch, Canterbury)	10 February	Lady Wigram Trophy; Trans-Tasman Challenge; New Zealand GT Championship; TGR 86 Series NZ	2024 Formula Regional Oceania Championship is located in New Zealand
4	R2	Euromarque Motorsport Park (Christchurch, Canterbury)	11 February	Lady Wigram Trophy; Trans-Tasman Challenge; New Zealand GT Championship; TGR 86 Series NZ	2024 Formula Regional Oceania Championship is located in New Zealand
4	R3	Euromarque Motorsport Park (Christchurch, Canterbury)	11 February	Lady Wigram Trophy; Trans-Tasman Challenge; New Zealand GT Championship; TGR 86 Series NZ	2024 Formula Regional Oceania Championship is located in New Zealand
5	R1	Highlands Motorsport Park (Cromwell, Otago)	17 February	New Zealand Grand Prix; Trans-Tasman Challenge; New Zealand GT Championship; TGR 86 Series NZ	2024 Formula Regional Oceania Championship is located in New Zealand
5	R2	Highlands Motorsport Park (Cromwell, Otago)	18 February	New Zealand Grand Prix; Trans-Tasman Challenge; New Zealand GT Championship; TGR 86 Series NZ	2024 Formula Regional Oceania Championship is located in New Zealand
5	R3	Highlands Motorsport Park (Cromwell, Otago)	18 February	New Zealand Grand Prix; Trans-Tasman Challenge; New Zealand GT Championship; TGR 86 Series NZ	2024 Formula Regional Oceania Championship is located in New Zealand

== Race results ==
Round		Circuit	Pole position	Fastest lap	Winning driver	Winning team
1	R1	Taupo International Motorsport Park	(Australia) Christian Mansell	(Poland) Roman Biliński	(Poland) Roman Biliński	M2 Competition
1	R2	Taupo International Motorsport Park		(New Zealand) Alex Crosbie	(Hong Kong) Gerrard Xie	M2 Competition
1	R3	Taupo International Motorsport Park	(Australia) Christian Mansell	(Australia) Christian Mansell	(Poland) Roman Biliński	M2 Competition
2	R1	Manfeild: Circuit Chris Amon	(Poland) Roman Biliński	(Italy) Nicola Lacorte	(Poland) Roman Biliński	M2 Competition
2	R2	Manfeild: Circuit Chris Amon		(New Zealand) Kaleb Ngatoa	(Australia) Christian Mansell	Giles Motorsport
2	R3	Manfeild: Circuit Chris Amon	(Poland) Roman Biliński	(New Zealand) Liam Sceats	(Poland) Roman Biliński	M2 Competition
3	R1	Hampton Downs Motorsport Park	(Hong Kong) Gerrard Xie	(New Zealand) Liam Sceats	(Poland) Roman Biliński	M2 Competition
3	R2	Hampton Downs Motorsport Park		(Poland) Roman Biliński	(Italy) Nicola Lacorte	M2 Competition
3	R3	Hampton Downs Motorsport Park	(Poland) Roman Biliński	(Poland) Roman Biliński	(New Zealand) Kaleb Ngatoa	Giles Motorsport
4	R1	Euromarque Motorsport Park	(Poland) Roman Biliński	(United States) Bryce Aron	(Poland) Roman Biliński	M2 Competition
4	R2	Euromarque Motorsport Park		(South Korea) Michael Shin	(South Korea) Michael Shin	M2 Competition
4	R3	Euromarque Motorsport Park	(Poland) Roman Biliński	(Poland) Roman Biliński	(New Zealand) Liam Sceats	M2 Competition
5	R1	Highlands Motorsport Park	(New Zealand) Liam Sceats	(New Zealand) Liam Sceats	(New Zealand) Liam Sceats	M2 Competition
5	R2	Highlands Motorsport Park		(Poland) Roman Biliński	(United States) Bryce Aron	M2 Competition
5	R3	Highlands Motorsport Park	(New Zealand) Liam Sceats	(Poland) Roman Biliński	(New Zealand) Liam Sceats	M2 Competition

== Season report ==
=== First half ===
The 2024 Formula Regional Oceania Championship began at a wet Taupo with Giles's Christian Mansell taking pole position for the first race. His advantage was short-lived, however, as M2's Roman Biliński grabbed the lead at the start. He continued to lead Mansell all 18 laps, throughout a safety car phase. His teammate Michael Shin completed the podium. Giles's Alex Crosbie headed the field for the reversed-grid second race. Two caution periods disrupted proceedings, allowing M2's Gerrard Xie to rise up to second and then grab the lead at the final restart to win. Crosbie dropped to third, behind Biliński. Mansell had qualified on pole position for the third race, but a penalty saw him start fifth. Nevertheless, he was back in second by the end of the first lap and took the lead on lap four. Biliński took second shortly after and began closing up on Mansell. The Pole took the lead on lap 19 and went on to take the win. Mansell and M2's Liam Sceats were on the podium and left Taupo equal on points, 25 behind Biliński.

Biliński continued his form by taking pole position for the first race at Manfeild. He led Mansell throughout most of the first race, before the Australian dropped to tenth because of an electrical issue. This allowed Biliński to take a trouble-free win ahead of Lacorte and Sceats. The second race was held in wet conditions and saw Biliński forced to pit to repair his rain light, thereby removing him from contention. Xie spun from second place, while Mansell and his teammate Kaleb Ngatoa both got past Kiwi's polesitter Patrick Woods-Toth. The pair battled for the race lead with Mansell eventually coming out on top, while mtec's Tommy Smith completed the podium. Another pole position for Biliński put him in prime position for race three. Wet conditions first saw a red flag for a crash between Lacorte and Shin, before multiple drivers spun and race control elected to stop the race early. Biliński won ahead of Mansell and Sceats, now with a slightly reduced lead of 22 points ahead of newly crowned Tasman Cup winner Mansell.

Round three at Hampton Downs began with Xie taking pole position and Biliński only managing 14th place. He turned his frustration into a momentous first race: in changing conditions, he climbed eight places on the first lap into sixth, forced his way past Xie and Sceats into third and set out after Ngatoa and mtec's Kaden Probst. The pair had started on wet tires, but the track was now dry enough that Biliński could easily take the lead and the win ahead of Sceats and Woods-Toth. Race two began with Lacorte overtaking Shin into turn one, with the Italian, then controlling the race out in front to win ahead of the Korean with Biliński in third. Now the Pole had also regained his one-lap pace and took pole position for race three. Xie was to start alongside him, but a heavy crash in race two saw him withdraw. This allowed Ngatoa into second and he used that to overtake Biliński and leading him home. Shin came third, as Sceats overtook the absent Mansell for second in the standings, now 50 points behind Biliński.

=== Second half ===
The series' return to Ruapuna saw Biliński claim another pole position ahead of Sceats. The first race opened with a lengthy stoppage after heavy contact between Probst and Kiwi's Titus Sherlock. Bilinsiki controlled the restart and resisted Sceats's pressure all race long. Behind them, mtec's returnee Jacob Abel held on to third in a three-car battle with Ngatoa and Giles's Alex Crosbie. Race two saw front-row starters Shin and Woods-Toth making slight contact side-by-side into turn one. This saw Woods-Toth drop to third behind Xie. Shin then pulled away to win, while Xie did all he could to keep Woods-Toth behind him. Biliński was on pole position again for the third race, again heading Sceats, but this time, the Kiwi got the better of the Pole into the first turn to take the lead. Again the leader had to resist pressure from behind, but like Biliński the day before, Sceats did not put a foot wrong to claim his maiden win. Still, Biliński had grown his lead to 56 points, with 90 still on offer heading into the final weekend.

Qualifying for the New Zealand Grand Prix at Highlands began with a shock for Biliński as he crashed, putting him 13th on the grid for the Grand Prix, while Sceats took two pole positions. The first race saw a controlled lights-to-flag victory by Sceats to keep the championship alive going into the final day of the season. Biliński started fourth and got into second, but could not find a way past mtec's Callum Hedge. M2's Bryce Aron started the second race from pole position, while Biliński was in fifth. He needed to outscore Sceats to take the title, but did more than that, rising to second and briefly contending for victory before dropping back into third behind Woods-Toth. He thereby took the championship title, while Woods-Toth claimed the Rookie win. Sceats's only consolation for the loss of the championship title came in him winning the Grand Prix, resisting Hedge for 27 laps before claiming the victory, with Shin also on the podium. Biliński's season ended in a wild crash, going over the top of Aron's car in the final turn.

Biliński came to New Zealand with a single Formula Regional podium in his previous career, but was a championship contender right off the bat. While most of his six wins came from front-row starts, a defining moment of his championship was his win from fourteenth on the grid at Hampton Downs. Biliński called his championship "massively" important for his career, calling himself "absolutely over the moon". Sceats was runner-up in a Formula Regional Championship for the second time in a year after his 2023 Formula Regional Japan campaign, but found comfort in winning the Grand Prix. After the race, his words to the media talking about his win were: "I’m speechless. I can’t even think right now. I can’t believe it." The championship's second year post-COVID saw it further reestablish itself as a competitive winter series, while also continuing to build upon its unique selling points with the addition of features like a fossil-free fuel.

== Championship standings ==
=== Scoring system ===
No points were awarded for pole position or fastest lap.

Race (starting grid from qualifying)

Position	1st	2nd	3rd	4th	5th	6th	7th	8th	9th	10th	11th	12th	13th	14th	15th	16th	17th	18th	19th	20th
Points	35	31	27	24	22	20	18	16	14	12	10	9	8	7	6	5	4	3	2	1

Reversed grid race

Position	1st	2nd	3rd	4th	5th	6th	7th	8th	9th	10th	11th	12th	13th	14th	15th
Points	20	18	16	14	12	10	9	8	7	6	5	4	3	2	1

=== Drivers' championship ===
Pos.	Driver	TAU			MAN			HMP			RUA			HIG			Points
Pos.	Driver	R1	R2	R3	R1	R2	R3	R1	R2	R3	R1	R2	R3	R1	R2	R3	Points
1	(Poland) Roman Biliński	1	2	1	**1**	17	**1**	1	3	**2**	**1**	4	**2**	3	3	5	385
2	(New Zealand) Liam Sceats	5	4	3	3	6	3	2	6	5	2	8	1	**1**	9	**1**	341
3	(Canada) Patrick Woods-Toth	16	5	9	8	4	6	3	4	6	7	3	3	6	2	9	255
4	(South Korea) Michael Shin	3	7	5	17	12	Ret	6	2	3	8	1	7	4	7	3	245
5	(New Zealand) Alex Crosbie	8	3	4	9	7	7	12	10	8	5	6	8	13	12	7	206
6	(New Zealand) Kaleb Ngatoa	4	14	7	4	2	5	16	7	1	4	5	10	WD	WD	WD	205
7	(Hong Kong) Gerrard Xie	6	1	11	7	10	15	**4**	5	WD	6	2	6	8	6	16	205
8	(Australia) Tommy Smith	7	6	12	6	3	4	5	9	7							144
9	(Australia) Christian Mansell	**2**	Ret	**2**	5	1	2										135
10	(Italy) Nicola Lacorte	Ret	11	6	2	5	Ret	7	1	4							130
11	(Australia) Elliott Cleary	10	8	10	14	9	10	8	8	11				9	10	10	124
12	(United States) Jett Bowling	12	12	15	11	13	9	13	14	15	10	9	9	11	11	11	120
13	(United States) Jacob Abel										3	7	5	5	4	4	118
14	(United States) Titus Sherlock	11	Ret	8	13	8	8	11	13	9	Ret	12	11	17	14	Ret	105
15	(United States) Bryce Aron										9	10	4	7	1	6	102
16	(United States) Landan Matriano Lim	15	9	17	15	11	12	10	15	13	11	13	13	15	15	13	94
17	(Brazil) Lucas Fecury	9	NC	16	10	16	13	9	12	12	12	14	Ret	14	17	14	91
18	(New Zealand) Callum Hedge													2	5	2	74
19	(United States) Jake Bonilla	14	10	14	16	15	14	14	16	14	13	15	14	16	16	15	74
20	(New Zealand) Kaden Probst	13	13	13	12	14	11	15	11	10	Ret	WD	WD				63
21	(New Zealand) Sebastian Manson										DNS	11	12	10	8	12	43
22	(Australia) Ryder Quinn													12	13	8	28
Pos.	Driver	R1	R2	R3	R1	R2	R3	R1	R2	R3	R1	R2	R3	R1	R2	R3	Points
Pos.	Driver	TAU			MAN			HMP			RUA			HIG			Points

Colour	Result
Gold	Winner
Silver	Second place
Bronze	Third place
Green	Points classification
Blue	Non-points classification
Blue	Non-classified finish (NC)
Purple	Retired, not classified (Ret)
Red	Did not qualify (DNQ)
Red	Did not pre-qualify (DNPQ)
Black	Disqualified (DSQ)
White	Did not start (DNS)
White	Withdrew (WD)
White	Race cancelled (C)
Blank	Did not practice (DNP)
Blank	Did not arrive (DNA)
Blank	Excluded (EX)

**Bold** – Pole

Italics – Fastest Lap

† — Did not finish, but classified

Rookie

=== Tasman Series ===
Pos.	Driver	TAU			MAN			Points
Pos.	Driver	R1	R2	R3	R1	R2	R3	Points
1	(Australia) Christian Mansell	**2**	Ret	**2**	5	1	2	135
2	(New Zealand) Liam Sceats	5	4	3	3	6	3	127
3	(New Zealand) Kaleb Ngatoa	4	14	7	4	2	5	108
4	(Australia) Tommy Smith	7	6	12	6	3	4	97
5	(New Zealand) Alex Crosbie	8	3	4	9	7	7	97
6	(Australia) Elliott Cleary	10	8	10	14	9	10	58
7	(New Zealand) Kaden Probst	13	13	13	12	14	11	40
