= 2023 Formula Regional Americas Championship =

Motor racing competition

The 2023 Formula Regional Americas Championship powered by Honda was the sixth season of a FIA-sanctioned F3 series across North America, and the fourth season under the Formula Regional moniker after a rebrand in 2020. The series was promoted by SCCA Pro Racing, the professional racing division of the Sports Car Club of America. Drivers competed to win a Honda-backed Super Formula seat for 2024.

Callum Hedge won the Drivers' Championship with two races to spare after winning 13 of the 18 races, while his team, Crosslink Kiwi Motorsport, had already clinched the Teams' Championship shortly after the mid-point of the season.

== Teams and drivers ==
All drivers competed with Honda-powered Ligier JS F3 cars on Hankook tires. This was the last season of the championship using a Honda powertrain, with a switch to Ligier engines planned for 2024.

Team	No.	Driver	Rounds
(United States) Jensen Global Advisors	1	(Sweden) Oliver Westling	All
(United States) Jensen Global Advisors	2	(United States) Everett Stack	5–6
(United States) IGY6 Motorsports	3	(United States) Hayden Bowlsbey	1–2
(United States) IGY6 Motorsports	22	(United States) Hayden Bowlsbey	3–6
(United States) IGY6 Motorsports	22	(United States) Max Hewitt	1–2
(United States) Crosslink Kiwi Motorsports	6	(Canada) Nicole Havrda	4–5
(United States) Crosslink Kiwi Motorsports	12	(Mexico) Manuel Roza	1–3, 5–6
(United States) Crosslink Kiwi Motorsports	17	(New Zealand) Callum Hedge	All
(United States) Crosslink Kiwi Motorsports	19	(United States) Cooper Becklin	All
(United States) Crosslink Kiwi Motorsports	20	(United States) Jake Bonilla	6
(United States) Crosslink Kiwi Motorsports	24	(United States) Kevin Janzen	1–3, 5–6
(United States) Crosslink Kiwi Motorsports	39	(United States) Bryson Morris	1–2
(United States) Crosslink Kiwi Motorsports	39	(United States) Max Hewitt	3–6
(United States) Crosslink Kiwi Motorsports	66	(United States) Ryan Shehan	All
(United States) Austin Hill Motorsports	8	(United States) Austin Hill	1–5
(United States) Velocity Racing Development	10	(Bolivia) Rodrigo Gutiérrez	2
(United States) Velocity Racing Development	11	(United States) Cole Kleck	3
(United States) Speed Factory	11	(United States) Cole Kleck	6
(United States) Cameron Racing	29	(United States) Nick Persing	1–2

== Race calendar ==
The 2023 calendar was announced on 9 October 2022, and visited the same locations as the season before. Each round featured three races, bringing the total to 18 races over the season.

Round		Circuit	Date	Supporting	Map of circuit locations
1	R1	NOLA Motorsports Park, Avondale	11 March	Formula 4 United States Championship; SVRA Sprint Series; Trans-Am Series; Ultimate Street Car Association	2023 Formula Regional Americas Championship is located in the United States
1	R2	NOLA Motorsports Park, Avondale	12 March	Formula 4 United States Championship; SVRA Sprint Series; Trans-Am Series; Ultimate Street Car Association	2023 Formula Regional Americas Championship is located in the United States
1	R3	NOLA Motorsports Park, Avondale	12 March	Formula 4 United States Championship; SVRA Sprint Series; Trans-Am Series; Ultimate Street Car Association	2023 Formula Regional Americas Championship is located in the United States
2	R1	Road America, Elkhart Lake	20 May	Formula 4 United States Championship; Road America SpeedTour; SVRA Sprint Series	2023 Formula Regional Americas Championship is located in the United States
2	R2	Road America, Elkhart Lake	21 May	Formula 4 United States Championship; Road America SpeedTour; SVRA Sprint Series	2023 Formula Regional Americas Championship is located in the United States
2	R3	Road America, Elkhart Lake	21 May	Formula 4 United States Championship; Road America SpeedTour; SVRA Sprint Series	2023 Formula Regional Americas Championship is located in the United States
3	R1	Mid-Ohio Sports Car Course, Lexington	24 June	PERMCO Grand Prix of Mid-Ohio; Formula 4 United States Championship; SVRA Sprint & Endurance; Trans-Am Series	2023 Formula Regional Americas Championship is located in the United States
3	R2	Mid-Ohio Sports Car Course, Lexington	25 June	PERMCO Grand Prix of Mid-Ohio; Formula 4 United States Championship; SVRA Sprint & Endurance; Trans-Am Series	2023 Formula Regional Americas Championship is located in the United States
3	R3	Mid-Ohio Sports Car Course, Lexington	25 June	PERMCO Grand Prix of Mid-Ohio; Formula 4 United States Championship; SVRA Sprint & Endurance; Trans-Am Series	2023 Formula Regional Americas Championship is located in the United States
4	R1	New Jersey Motorsports Park, Millville	29 July	New Jersey SpeedTour; Formula 4 United States Championship; SVRA Sprint Series; FRP (F2000, F1600)	2023 Formula Regional Americas Championship is located in the United States
4	R2	New Jersey Motorsports Park, Millville	30 July	New Jersey SpeedTour; Formula 4 United States Championship; SVRA Sprint Series; FRP (F2000, F1600)	2023 Formula Regional Americas Championship is located in the United States
4	R3	New Jersey Motorsports Park, Millville	30 July	New Jersey SpeedTour; Formula 4 United States Championship; SVRA Sprint Series; FRP (F2000, F1600)	2023 Formula Regional Americas Championship is located in the United States
5	R1	Virginia International Raceway, Alton	7 October	VIR SpeedTour; Formula 4 United States Championship; SVRA Sprint & Endurance; Trans-Am Series	2023 Formula Regional Americas Championship is located in the United States
5	R2	Virginia International Raceway, Alton	7 October	VIR SpeedTour; Formula 4 United States Championship; SVRA Sprint & Endurance; Trans-Am Series	2023 Formula Regional Americas Championship is located in the United States
5	R3	Virginia International Raceway, Alton	8 October	VIR SpeedTour; Formula 4 United States Championship; SVRA Sprint & Endurance; Trans-Am Series	2023 Formula Regional Americas Championship is located in the United States
6	R1	Circuit of the Americas, Austin	3 November	Austin SpeedTour; Formula 4 United States Championship; Trans-Am Series; SVRA Sprint Series	2023 Formula Regional Americas Championship is located in the United States
6	R2	Circuit of the Americas, Austin	3 November	Austin SpeedTour; Formula 4 United States Championship; Trans-Am Series; SVRA Sprint Series	2023 Formula Regional Americas Championship is located in the United States
6	R3	Circuit of the Americas, Austin	4 November	Austin SpeedTour; Formula 4 United States Championship; Trans-Am Series; SVRA Sprint Series	2023 Formula Regional Americas Championship is located in the United States

== Race results ==
Round		Circuit	Pole position	Fastest lap	Winning driver	Winning team
1	R1	NOLA Motorsports Park	(United States) Ryan Shehan	(United States) Ryan Shehan	(United States) Ryan Shehan	(United States) Crosslink Kiwi Motorsports
1	R2	NOLA Motorsports Park		(United States) Cooper Becklin	(United States) Ryan Shehan	(United States) Crosslink Kiwi Motorsports
1	R3	NOLA Motorsports Park		(United States) Nick Persing	(New Zealand) Callum Hedge	(United States) Crosslink Kiwi Motorsports
2	R1	Road America	(New Zealand) Callum Hedge	(New Zealand) Callum Hedge	(New Zealand) Callum Hedge	(United States) Crosslink Kiwi Motorsports
2	R2	Road America		(New Zealand) Callum Hedge	(New Zealand) Callum Hedge	(United States) Crosslink Kiwi Motorsports
2	R3	Road America		(New Zealand) Callum Hedge	(New Zealand) Callum Hedge	(United States) Crosslink Kiwi Motorsports
3	R1	Mid-Ohio Sports Car Course	(New Zealand) Callum Hedge	(United States) Ryan Shehan	(New Zealand) Callum Hedge	(United States) Crosslink Kiwi Motorsports
3	R2	Mid-Ohio Sports Car Course		(New Zealand) Callum Hedge	(New Zealand) Callum Hedge	(United States) Crosslink Kiwi Motorsports
3	R3	Mid-Ohio Sports Car Course		(United States) Austin Hill	(New Zealand) Callum Hedge	(United States) Crosslink Kiwi Motorsports
4	R1	New Jersey Motorsports Park	(New Zealand) Callum Hedge	(United States) Cooper Becklin	(Sweden) Oliver Westling	(United States) Jensen Global Advisors
4	R2	New Jersey Motorsports Park		(New Zealand) Callum Hedge	(New Zealand) Callum Hedge	(United States) Crosslink Kiwi Motorsports
4	R3	New Jersey Motorsports Park		(United States) Hayden Bowlsbey	(New Zealand) Callum Hedge	(United States) Crosslink Kiwi Motorsports
5	R1	Virginia International Raceway	(New Zealand) Callum Hedge	(New Zealand) Callum Hedge	(New Zealand) Callum Hedge	(United States) Crosslink Kiwi Motorsports
5	R2	Virginia International Raceway		(New Zealand) Callum Hedge	(New Zealand) Callum Hedge	(United States) Crosslink Kiwi Motorsports
5	R3	Virginia International Raceway		(United States) Cooper Becklin	(United States) Cooper Becklin	(United States) Crosslink Kiwi Motorsports
6	R1	Circuit of the Americas	(New Zealand) Callum Hedge	(New Zealand) Callum Hedge	(New Zealand) Callum Hedge	(United States) Crosslink Kiwi Motorsports
6	R2	Circuit of the Americas		(New Zealand) Callum Hedge	(Sweden) Oliver Westling	(United States) Jensen Global Advisors
6	R3	Circuit of the Americas		(New Zealand) Callum Hedge	(New Zealand) Callum Hedge	(United States) Crosslink Kiwi Motorsports

== Season report ==
=== First half ===
The 2023 season began at NOLA Motorsports Park, just like the year before. Crosslink Kiwi's Ryan Shehan took pole position for the opening race and led that encounter lights-to-flag. Cameron Racing's Nick Persing was trying to attack him, but then made a mistake and had to spend the rest of his race defending from Shehan's teammate Cooper Becklin. Race two started the same way, before Persing went off at the halfway point and had to retire his car. This allowed Becklin into second and promoted his teammate Callum Hedge onto the podium closely behind. Becklin had pole position for the first race, but was quickly overtaken by Hedge and Persing. He then held on to third before locking up and being hit by Shehan behind. He fell down the order, and Shehan took his third podium of the weekend to leave Avondale with a 17-point lead over Hedge.

Hedge was first in qualifying at Road America. He was unchallenged during the first race, with Becklin behind him having to defend from Shehan. The latter's pace eventually proved to be too much and Becklin had to let him through. The second race began with a red-flag interruption because of a crash between Crosslink Kiwi's Max Hewitt and IGY6's Hayden Bowlsbey, but when it restarted, Hedge was similarly dominant to take another win. Shehan did not have to pass anyone this time to come second, and Becklin had to fend off his teammate Bryson Morris to take third. Race three was also interrupted, by two safety car periods, but Hedge remained unbeaten. Shehan was second again, fending off a late attack by Becklin. His triple win took Hedge into the championship lead, four points ahead of Shehan.

Only nine drivers were on the road at Mid-Ohio. The qualifying session was rained off, meaning Hedge was awarded pole position by virtue of his standings lead. He led Shehan all race long to take his fourth straight win, with Becklin third once again after he fended off Jensen's Oliver Westling at the start and the latter made a mistake. Shehan was on pole position for the second race, but it took less than a corner for Hedge to steal the lead away. Shehan and Becklin kept close to the leader, but the finishing order remained the same for the fifth time in a row. The third race saw another win from pole position for Hedge, with the podium consisting of the same three drivers as it had for the last two whole weekends. A second triple win for Hedge saw his championship lead grow to 25 points.

=== Second half ===
Entry numbers declined even more at New Jersey Motorsports Park, as only seven cars were present. Hedge took pole position once again, but his win streak would come to an end. He defended from Shehan at the start as Westling and Bowlsbey surprised the pair to both get ahead. Hedge had soon repassed Bowlsbey, but could not get past Westling. Shehan also passed Bowlsbey, but the pair made contact and Shehan was penalized, allowing Becklin onto the podium. Normal service returned for the second race, with Hedge starting fourth, but passed Westling, Becklin and Shehan in the first three turns to take the lead and the win. Race three was dominated by Hedge from pole position as he won over twelve seconds ahead of Westling, with Becklin third. Shehan could only manage sixth, losing further ground to Hedge, who now was 55 points ahead.

Hedge continued his one-lap pace to take another pole position at Virginia International Raceway. He fended Shehan off twice in race one, before spinning and dropping to second. A timely safety car brought him back right behind Shehan, and the latter then also made a mistake to restore the original order, before the race finished under caution. Becklin came third once again. Race two also brought the by now familiar sight of Hedge ahead of Shehan and Becklin, although the latter had to pass Westling for his podium. Hedge looked set for another triple victory, before he was hit with an engine issue that forced him to retire from race three. Becklin inherited first place, fighting off Shehan to take his first win of the season, while Bowlsbey secured his first podium with a late move on Westling. Hedge's retirement saw his points lead reduced to 51, with 75 still on offer.

The season finale at Circuit of the Americas brought no new sight in qualifying, as Hedge remained on top. He fended off any opposition at the start of race one and sprinted away from the field to take the win and with it the championship. Speed Factory's series returnee Cole Kleck took second at the start and fought with Shehan through the first half. The latter was then passed by Becklin, who also overtook Kleck on the final lap. Race two saw Westling take his second win in a photo-finish after he passed polesitter and race-long leader Hedge through the final corner. Race three brought the season to its end with another trademark unchallenged win for Hedge, with Westling having a lonely race in second ahead of Crosslink Kiwi's Manuel Roza, who took his second podium in a row.

== Championship standings ==
Points were awarded as follows:

Position	**1st**	**2nd**	**3rd**	**4th**	**5th**	**6th**	**7th**	**8th**	**9th**	**10th**
Points	25	18	15	12	10	8	6	4	2	1

=== Drivers' standings ===
Pos	Driver	NOL			ROA			MOH			NJM			VIR			COA			Pts
Pos	Driver	R1	R2	R3	R1	R2	R3	R1	R2	R3	R1	R2	R3	R1	R2	R3	R1	R2	R3	Pts
1	(New Zealand) Callum Hedge	6	3	1	**1**	1	1	**1**	1	1	**2**	1	1	**1**	1	Ret	**1**	2	1	384
2	(United States) Ryan Shehan	**1**	1	3	2	2	2	2	2	2	4	2	6	2	2	2	10	4	10	279
3	(United States) Cooper Becklin	3	2	11†	3	3	3	3	3	3	3	3	3	3	3	1	2	5	Ret	251
4	(Sweden) Oliver Westling	4	5	7	4	5	10†	6	4	8	1	4	2	4	4	4	6	1	2	217
5	(Mexico) Manuel Roza	7	6	4	7	7	4	4	6	4				WD	WD	WD	5	3	3	122
6	(United States) Hayden Bowlsbey	Ret	9	6	10	Ret	DNS	5	5	6	6	6	7	8	5	3	4	7	6	116
7	(United States) Max Hewitt	9†	8	9	9	Ret	5	9	9	Ret	Ret	5	4	10†	6	6	7	8	8	77
8	(United States) Bryson Morris	5	4	5	5	4	6													62
9	(United States) Nick Persing	2	Ret	2	6	6	Ret													52
10	(United States) Cole Kleck							8	7	7							3	6	4	51
11	(United States) Austin Hill	Ret	DNS	8	11	10†	8	7	8	5	WD	WD	WD	5	8	DNS				42
12	(Canada) Nicole Havrda										5	Ret	5	6	Ret	5				38
13	(United States) Everett Stack													7	7	7	9	9	7	28
14	(United States) Kevin Janzen	8	7	10	12	9	9	WD	WD	WD				9	9	8	11	10	9	26
15	(United States) Jake Bonilla																8	Ret	5	14
16	(Bolivia) Rodrigo Gutiérrez				8	8	7													14
Pos	Driver	R1	R2	R3	R1	R2	R3	R1	R2	R3	R1	R2	R3	R1	R2	R3	R1	R2	R3	Pts
Pos	Driver	NOL			ROA			MOH			NJM			VIR			COA			Pts

Colour	Result
Gold	Winner
Silver	Second place
Bronze	Third place
Green	Points classification
Blue	Non-points classification
Blue	Non-classified finish (NC)
Purple	Retired, not classified (Ret)
Red	Did not qualify (DNQ)
Red	Did not pre-qualify (DNPQ)
Black	Disqualified (DSQ)
White	Did not start (DNS)
White	Withdrew (WD)
White	Race cancelled (C)
Blank	Did not practice (DNP)
Blank	Did not arrive (DNA)
Blank	Excluded (EX)

**Bold** – Pole

Italics – Fastest Lap

† — Did not finish, but classified

=== Teams' standings ===
Only a teams' two best-finishing cars were eligible for teams' championship points.

Pos	Team	NOL			ROA			MOH			NJM			VIR			COA			Pts
Pos	Team	R1	R2	R3	R1	R2	R3	R1	R2	R3	R1	R2	R3	R1	R2	R3	R1	R2	R3	Pts
1	(United States) Crosslink Kiwi Motorsports	1	1	1	1	1	1	1	1	1	2	1	1	1	1	1	1	2	1	742
1	(United States) Crosslink Kiwi Motorsports	3	2	3	2	2	2	2	2	2	3	2	3	2	2	2	2	3	3	742
2	(United States) Jensen Global Advisors	4	5	7	4	5	10†	6	4	8	1	4	2	4	4	4	6	1	2	245
2	(United States) Jensen Global Advisors													7	7	7	9	9	7	245
3	(United States) IGY6 Motorsports	9†	8	6	9	Ret	5	5	5	6	6	6	7	8	5	3	4	7	6	136
3	(United States) IGY6 Motorsports	Ret	9	9	10	Ret	DNS													136
4	(United States) Cameron Racing	2	Ret	2	6	6	Ret													52
5	(United States) Austin Hill Motorsports	Ret	DNS	8	11	10†	8	7	8	5	WD	WD	WD	5	8	DNS				42
6	(United States) Speed Factory																3	6	4	35
7	(United States) Velocity Racing Development				8	8	7	8	7	7										30
Pos	Team	R1	R2	R3	R1	R2	R3	R1	R2	R3	R1	R2	R3	R1	R2	R3	R1	R2	R3	Pts
Pos	Team	NOL			ROA			MOH			NJM			VIR			COA			Pts
