= Carl Bennett (racing driver) =

Thai racing driver (born 2004)

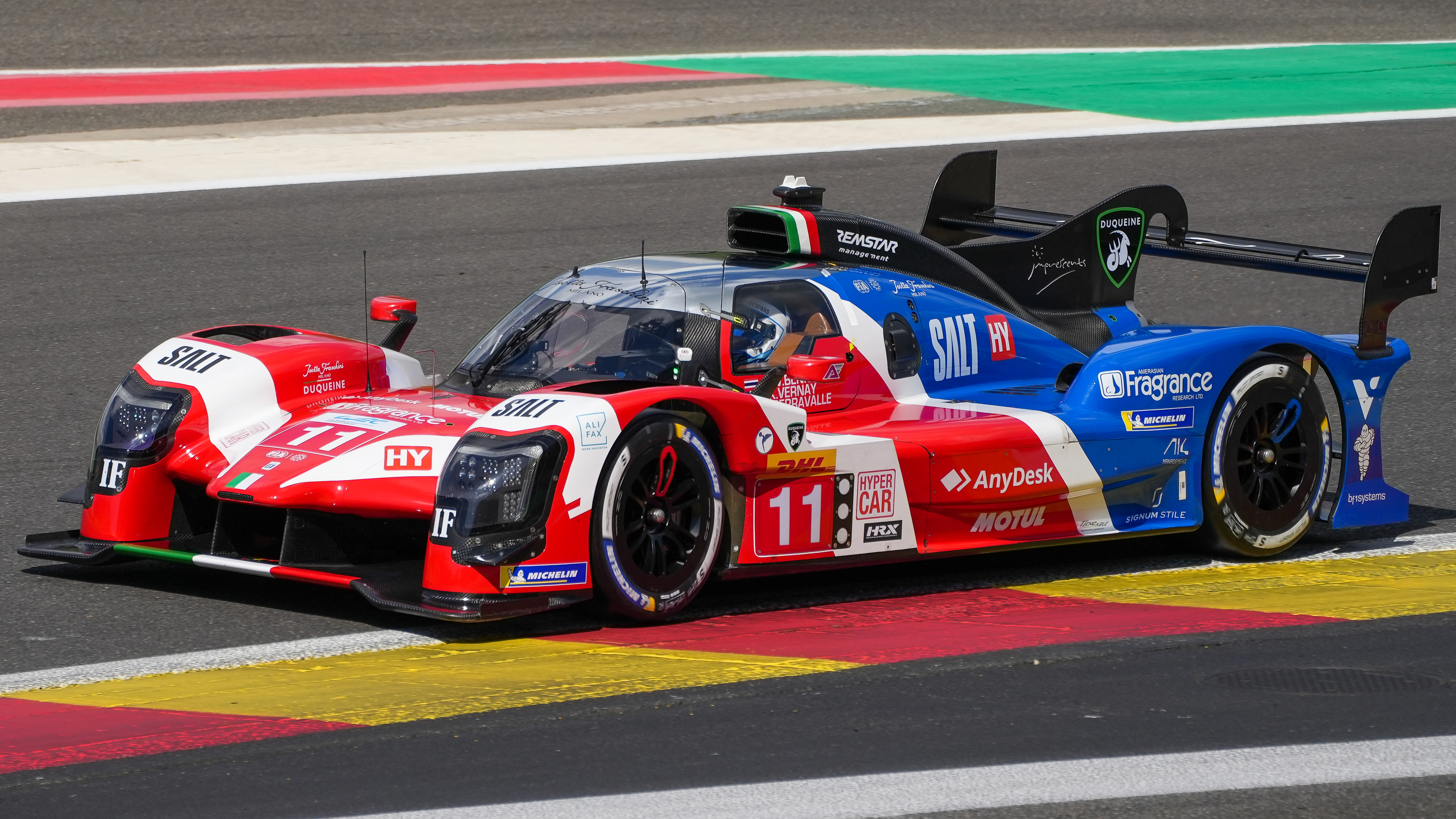
- Bennett at the 2024 6 Hours of Spa-Francorchamps
- Nationality: (Thailand) Thai (United States) American via dual nationality
- Born: 2 September 2004 (age 22) United States

GT World Challenge Europe Sprint Cup career
- Debut season: 2026
- Current team: AF Corse
- Categorisation: FIA Silver
- Car number: 71
- Starts: 0
- Wins: 0
- Podiums: 0
- Poles: 0
- Fastest laps: 0
- Best finish: TBD in 2026

Previous series
- 2025; 2024; 2024; 2023; 2023; 2023; 2022–2023; 2022: International GT Open; FIA WEC; ELMS; Eurocup-3; F4 Brazilian; F4 Spanish; F4 United States; YACademy Winter Series

Carl Wattana Bennett (born 2 September 2004) is a Thai-American racing driver who competes in the GT World Challenge Europe Sprint Cup for AF Corse. He previously competed in the International GT Open for AF Corse, the FIA World Endurance Championship for Isotta Fraschini and the European Le Mans Series for Cool Racing. Having raced in various Formula 4 series as well as Eurocup-3, Bennett switched to endurance racing in 2023, achieving a podium in the Asian Le Mans Series in the LMP2 class before progressing to Hypercar, the top class of WEC.

Bennett is a member of A14 Management, overseen by two-time Formula One World Champion Fernando Alonso.

== Racing career ==
Born in the United States but raised in Bangkok, Bennett began his career in motorsport by participating in various karting championships such as the Rotax Max Thailand, the IAME Asia Cup and the IAME International Final.

In 2022, Bennett began his racing season by participating in the American YACademy Winter Series championship in which he drove a Ligier JS F4, a championship which he completed by finishing in 13th place with five points. Then, he again drove a Ligier JS F4 in the Formula 4 United States Championship with the Gonella Racing team, a championship which he completed by finishing in 14th place with 24 points with the best performance in the fourth race in eighth place.

In 2023, Bennett joined Fernando Alonso's management company, A14 Management, in order to develop in motorsport. For the second consecutive year, he participated in the Formula 4 United States Championship with the Gonella Racing team, a championship which he completed by finishing in 13th place with 37 points with his best performance in the race, a first place during the round taking place at NOLA Motorsports Park. He also participated in the F4 Brazilian Championship with the Oakberry Bassani F4 team and in the F4 Spanish Championship and the Eurocup-3 championship with the GRS Team. At the end of the season, he joined the French Duqueine Team to participate in the Asian Le Mans Series in the LMP2 category.

In 2024, Bennett extended his commitment with the Duqueine Team to participate in the European Le Mans Series in the LMP2 category at the wheel of an Oreca 07 as well as in the FIA World Endurance Championship in the Hypercar category at the wheel of an Isotta Fraschini Tipo 6 LMH-C. After missing the first two rounds for Duqueine Team in the ELMS, Bennett moved to Cool Racing, replacing Alex García who left the team.

== Racing record ==
=== Racing career summary ===
Season	Series	Team	Races	Wins	Poles	F/Laps	Podiums	Points	Position
2022	Formula 4 United States Championship	Gonella Racing	18	0	0	0	0	24	14th
2022	YACademy Winter Series	Gonella Racing	6	0	0	0	0	5	13th
2022	GB4 Championship	Fortec Motorsport	3	0	0	0	0	25	21st
2022	F4 Spanish Championship	Saintéloc Racing	3	0	0	0	0	0	NC†
2023	F4 Spanish Championship	GRS Team	15	0	0	0	0	0	33rd
2023	Eurocup-3	GRS Team	4	0	0	0	0	0	23rd
2023	Formula 4 United States Championship	Gonella Racing	11	1	0	1	1	37	13th
2023	F4 Brazilian Championship	Oakberry Bassani F4	6	0	0	1	1	26	14th
2023	Formula Winter Series	AKM Motorsport	4	0	0	0	0	12	13th
2023–24	Asian Le Mans Series - LMP2	Duqueine Team	5	0	0	0	1	29	10th
2024	FIA World Endurance Championship - Hypercar	Isotta Fraschini	5	0	0	0	0	0	33rd
2024	European Le Mans Series - LMP2	Cool Racing	4	0	0	0	1	16	20th
2024	IMSA Ford Mustang Challenge	Amerasian Fragrance Competition Motorsports	2	0	0	0	0	320	32nd
2024–25	Asian Le Mans Series - GT	Absolute Racing	6	0	0	0	0	0	33rd
2025	International GT Open	AF Corse	14	4	1	2	6	136	**2nd**
2025	TSS The Super Series - GT3	Amerasian Fragrance by AF Racing	2	0	0	0	0	0	NC†
2025	TSS The Super Series - GTC	Amerasian Fragrance by AF Racing	2	0	0	0	0	0	NC†
2025–26	Asian Le Mans Series - GT	Amerasian Fragrance by AF Racing	6	0	0	0	0	0	34nd
2026	IMSA SportsCar Championship - GTD	van der Steur Racing	1	0	0	0	0	226	70th
2026	GT World Challenge Europe Sprint Cup	AF Corse	10	0	0	0	0	0	NC
2026	GT World Challenge Europe Endurance Cup	Razoon – more than racing	1	0	0	0	0	0	NC†

* Season still in progress.

=== Complete Formula 4 United States Championship results ===
(key) (Races in bold indicate pole position) (Races in italics indicate fastest lap)

Year	Team	1	2	3	4	5	6	7	8	9	10	11	12	13	14	15	16	17	18	Pos	Points
2022	Gonella Racing	NOL; 1; 11	NOL; 2; 10	NOL; 3; 9	ROA; 1; 11	ROA; 2; 10	ROA; 3; 12	MOH; 1; 8	MOH; 2; 8	MOH; 3; 20	NJM; 1; 11	NJM; 2; 10	NJM; 3; 8	VIR; 1; 6	VIR; 2 Ret	VIR; 3; 7	COA; 1; 17	COA; 2; 22	COA; 3; 20	14th	24
2023	Gonella Racing	NOL; 1; 1	NOL; 2; 8	NOL; 3; 21	ROA; 1; 6	ROA; 2; 11	ROA; 3; 13	MOH; 1	MOH; 2	MOH; 3	NJM; 1; 15	NJM; 2; 19	NJM; 3; 11	VIR; 1 Ret	VIR; 2 DNS	VIR; 3; 11	COA; 1	COA; 2	COA; 3	13th	37

=== Complete GB4 Championship results ===
(key) (Races in bold indicate pole position) (Races in italics indicate fastest lap)

Year	Team	1	2	3	4	5	6	7	8	9	10	11	12	13	14	15	16	17	18	19	20	21	22	23	24	Pos	Points
2022	Fortec Motorsport	SNE1; 1	SNE1; 2	SNE1; 3	OUL; 1	OUL; 2	OUL; 3	SIL1; 1	SIL1; 2	SIL1; 3	DON1; 1	DON1; 2	DON1; 3	SNE2; 1	SNE2; 2	SNE2; 3	SIL2; 1	SIL2; 2	SIL2; 3	BRH; 1	BRH; 2	BRH; 3	DON2; 1; 12	DON2; 2; 9	DON2; 3; 12	21st	25

=== Complete Formula Winter Series results ===
(key) (Races in bold indicate pole position; races in italics indicate fastest lap)

Year	Team	1	2	3	4	5	6	7	8	DC	Points
2023	AKM Motorsport	JER; 1; 7	JER; 2; 8	CRT; 1; 9	CRT; 2 Ret	NAV; 1	NAV; 2	CAT; 2	CAT; 2	13th	12

=== Complete F4 Spanish Championship results ===
(key) (Races in bold indicate pole position) (Races in italics indicate fastest lap)

Year	Team	1	2	3	4	5	6	7	8	9	10	11	12	13	14	15	16	17	18	19	20	21	DC	Points
2023	GRS Team	SPA; 1; 14	SPA; 2; 15	SPA; 3; 24†	ARA; 1; 20	ARA; 2; 16	ARA; 3; 19	NAV; 1; 17	NAV; 2; 22	NAV; 3; 22	JER; 1; 26	JER; 2; 20	JER; 3 Ret	EST; 1; 27	EST; 2; 29	EST; 3 Ret	CRT; 1	CRT; 2	CRT; 3	CAT; 1	CAT; 2	CAT; 3	33rd	0

=== Complete Eurocup-3 results ===
(key) (Races in bold indicate pole position) (Races in italics indicate fastest lap)

Year	Team	1	2	3	4	5	6	7	8	9	10	11	12	13	14	15	16	DC	Points
2023	GRS Team	SPA; 1	SPA; 2	ARA; 1	ARA; 2	MNZ; 1	MNZ; 2	ZAN; 1	ZAN; 2	JER; 1	JER; 2	EST; 1	EST; 2	CRT; 1; 16	CRT; 2; 12	CAT; 1; 17	CAT; 2 Ret	23rd	0

=== Complete F4 Brazilian Championship results ===
(key) (Races in bold indicate pole position; races in italics indicate fastest lap)

Year	Team	1	2	3	4	5	6	7	8	9	10	11	12	13	14	15	16	17	18	DC	Points
2023	Oakberry Bassani F4	INT1; 1	INT1; 2	INT1; 3	INT2; 1; 8	INT2; 2; 9	INT2; 3; 3	MOG; 1; 9	MOG; 2; 10	MOG; 3; 8	GYN; 1	GYN; 2	GYN; 3	INT3; 1	INT3; 2	INT3; 3	INT4; 1	INT4; 2	INT4; 3	14th	26

=== Complete Asian Le Mans Series results ===
(key) (Races in bold indicate pole position) (Races in italics indicate fastest lap)

Year	Team	Class	Car	Engine	1	2	3	4	5	6	Pos.	Points
2023–24	Duqueine Team	LMP2	Oreca 07	Gibson GK428 4.2 L V8	SEP; 1; 11	SEP; 2; 7	DUB; Ret	ABU; 1; 6	ABU; 2; 3		10th	29
2024–25	Absolute Racing	GT	Ferrari 296 GT3	Ferrari F163 3.0 L Turbo V6	SEP; 1 Ret	SEP; 2; 21	DUB; 1; 18	DUB; 2; 21	ABU; 1; 18	ABU; 2; 21	33rd	0
2025–26	Amerasian Fragrance by AF Racing	GT	Ferrari 296 GT3	Ferrari F163 3.0 L Turbo V6	SEP; 1 Ret	SEP; 2; 17	DUB; 1; 15	DUB; 2; 16	ABU; 1; 14	ABU; 2; 15	34th	0

=== Complete European Le Mans Series results ===
Year	Entrant	Class	Chassis	Engine	1	2	3	4	5	6	Rank	Points
2024	Cool Racing	LMP2	Oreca 07	Gibson GK428 4.2 L V8	CAT	LEC	IMO; 10	SPA; 11	MUG; 13	ALG; 3	20th	16

=== Complete FIA World Endurance Championship results ===
(key) (Races in bold indicate pole position) (Races in italics indicate fastest lap)

Year	Entrant	Class	Car	Engine	1	2	3	4	5	6	7	8	Rank	Points
2024	Isotta Fraschini	Hypercar	Isotta Fraschini Tipo 6 LMH-C	Isotta Fraschini 3.0 L Turbo V6	QAT; Ret	IMO; 17	SPA; 15	LMS; 14	SÃO; Ret	COA	FUJ	BHR	33rd	0

^{*} Season still in progress.

=== Complete 24 Hours of Le Mans results ===
Year	Team	Co-Drivers	Car	Class	Laps	Pos.	Class Pos.
2024	(Italy) Isotta Fraschini	(Canada) Antonio Serravalle (France) Jean-Karl Vernay	Isotta Fraschini Tipo 6 LMH-C	Hypercar	302	14th	14th

=== Complete IMSA SportsCar Championship results ===
(key) (Races in bold indicate pole position) (Races in italics indicate fastest lap)

Year	Team	Class	Make	Engine	1	2	3	4	5	6	7	8	9	10	Pos.	Points
2026	van der Steur Racing	GTD	Aston Martin Vantage AMR GT3 Evo	Aston Martin M177 4.0 L Turbo V8	DAY; 11	SEB	LBH	LGA	WGL	MOS	ELK	VIR	IMS	PET	70th	226

=== Complete GT World Challenge Europe results ===
==== GT World Challenge Europe Sprint Cup ====
(key) (Races in bold indicate pole position) (Races in italics indicate fastest lap)

Year	Team	Car	Class	1	2	3	4	5	6	7	8	9	10	Pos.	Points
2026	AF Corse	Ferrari 296 GT3 Evo	Silver	BRH; 1; 26	BRH; 2; 22	MIS; 1; 32	MIS; 2; 23	MAG; 1; 32	MAG; 2; 30	ZAN; 1 Ret	ZAN; 2; 28	**CAT**; **1**; 28	CAT; 2; 26	9th	27.5

==== GT World Challenge Europe Endurance Cup ====
(key) (Races in bold indicate pole position) (Races in italics indicate fastest lap)

Year	Team	Car	Class	1	2	3	4	5	6	7	Pos.	Points
2026	Razoon - more than racing	Porsche 911 GT3 R (992.2)	Pro-Am	LEC	MNZ	SPA; 6H; 56	SPA; 12H; 54	SPA; 24H; 42	NÜR	ALG	NC	0
