= Formula Regional Americas Championship =

Single-Seater Racing Championship

- Category: Formula Racing
- Country: United States, Canada, Mexico
- Region: North America
- Inaugural season: 2018
- Constructors: Onroak Automotive
- Engine suppliers: Honda
- Tyre suppliers: Hankook
- Drivers' champion: (United States) Titus Sherlock
- Teams' champion: (United States) Kiwi Motorsport
- Official website: Official website

The Formula Regional Americas Championship powered by Honda (formerly the F3 Americas Championship powered by Honda) is an FIA Formula Regional racing series that competes in the United States and Canada, with plans in the future to race in Mexico. The championship is sanctioned by SCCA Pro Racing, the professional racing division of the Sports Car Club of America, in conjunction with the Automobile Competition Committee for the United States, the United States representative to the FIA. The F3 Americas Championship updated its name to Formula Regional Americas Championship Powered by Honda in 2020.

== Championship format ==
Most events of the championship consists of three races, which are run on the support package of other motorsport events across North America, though some events only contain two races. The top 9 in points standings receive FIA Super License points. Starting in 2025 the champion will win a cash prize of $100,000

== Car ==
The championship utilizes a spec chassis for all competitors, this being the Ligier JS F3 chassis. This chassis features the halo device, which was also implemented in Formula One and Formula 2 in 2018.

=== Specifications (2018–present) ===
- Engine displacement: Honda K20C1 2.0 L (122 cu in) DOHC inline-4
- Gearbox: 6-speed sequential semi-automatic gearbox
- Weight: 1,150 lb (522 kg) excluding driver and fuel
- Power output: 303 hp (226 kW)
- Length: 4,765 mm (188 in)
- Width: 1,850 mm (73 in)
- Wheelbase: 2,825 mm (111 in)
- Steering: rack and pinion

== Champions ==
=== Drivers' ===
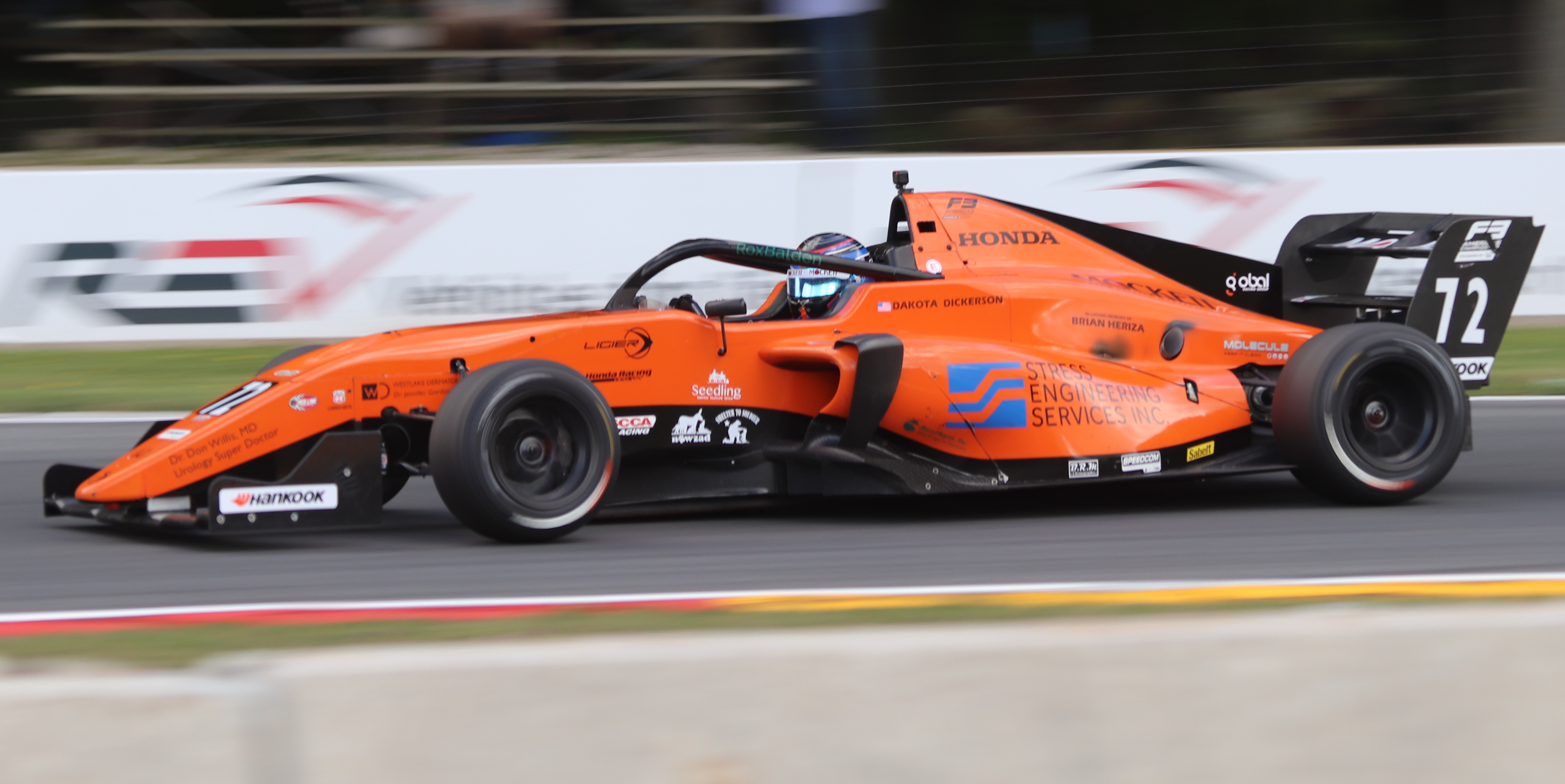
2019 champion Dakota Dickerson

Season	Driver	Team	Poles	Wins	Podiums	Fastest laps	Points	Clinched	Margin
2018	(United States) Kyle Kirkwood	(United States) Abel Motorsports	5	15	16	15	405	Race 14 of 17	129
2019	(United States) Dakota Dickerson	(United States) Global Racing Group	2	5	11	7	269	Race 13 of 16	48
2020	(Sweden) Linus Lundqvist	(United States) Global Racing Group	6	15	16	14	401	Race 14 of 17	118
2021	(Cayman Islands) Kyffin Simpson	(United States) (Australia) TJ Speed Motorsports	2	7	13	9	314	Race 16 of 18	96
2022	(South Africa) Raoul Hyman	(United States) (Australia) TJ Speed Motorsports	6	11	16	12	362	Race 16 of 18	81
2023	(New Zealand) Callum Hedge	(United States) Crosslink Kiwi Motorsport	5	13	16	10	384	Race 18 of 18	105
2024	(Canada) Patrick Woods-Toth	(United States) Crosslink Kiwi Motorsport	6	8	14	9	294.5	Race 15 of 19	106.5
2025	(United States) Titus Sherlock	(United States) Crosslink Motorsports	1	8	13	2	291.5	Race 19 of 20	41.5
2026	(United States) Brady Golan	(United States) Toney Driver Development	3	8	14	4	298.5	Race 19 of 21	57

=== Teams' ===
Season	Team	Poles	Wins	Podiums	Fastest laps	Points	Clinched	Margin
2018	(United States) Abel Motorsports	5	15	20	15	529	Race 16 of 17	50
2019	(United States) Global Racing Group	5	13	28	9	617	Race 13 of 16	363
2020	(United States) Global Racing Group	6	15	18	14	573	Race 14 of 17	206
2021	(United States) (Australia) TJ Speed Motorsports	2	7	21	9	529	Race 16 of 18	131
2022	(United States) (Australia) TJ Speed Motorsports	6	14	27	15	652	Race 16 of 18	127
2023	(United States) Crosslink Kiwi Motorsports	6	16	46	15	742	Race 12 of 18	497
2024	(United States) Crosslink Kiwi Motorsports	7	16	42	14	694.5	Race 9 of 19	526.5
2025	(United States) Kiwi Motorsports	5	8	34	7	600	Race 15 of 20	178
2026	(United States) Toney Driver Development	3	8	20	4	589.5	Race 21 of 21	31.5

== Circuits ==
Green dots represent circuits as of the 2026 season, purple represent future circuits, red represent former circuits.
- **Bold** denotes a current circuit is used in the 2026 season.
- **Italic** denotes future circuits are used in the 2027 season.

Number	Circuits	Rounds	Years
1	**Mid-Ohio Sports Car Course**	8	2018, 2020–present
2	**Virginia International Raceway**	7	2019–2023, 2025–present
2	(Texas) Circuit of the Americas	6	2018, 2020–2024
4	**New Jersey Motorsports Park**	6	2018, 2022–2026
4	(Louisiana) **NOLA Motorsports Park**	6	2018, 2022–2026
4	(Wisconsin) **Road America**	6	2021–present
7	(Alabama) **Barber Motorsports Park**	4	2019–2020, 2025–present
8	(Georgia (U.S. state)) **Road Atlanta**	3	2018–2019, 2021, 2027
8	(Indiana) **Indianapolis Motor Speedway**	3	2024–present
8	(Ontario) **Canadian Tire Motorsport Park**	3 (Note: Canadian Tire Motorsport Park will host 2 rounds in 2027.)	2024–present
11	(Pennsylvania) Pittsburgh International Race Complex	2	2018–2019
11	(Florida) Sebring International Raceway	2	2019–2020
13	(Florida) Homestead–Miami Speedway	1	2020
13	(Minnesota) Brainerd International Raceway	1	2021
15	(Quebec) **Circuit Trois-Rivières**	0	2027

== See also ==
- Formula Three
- United States Formula Three Championship
- Formula 4 United States Championship
- USF2000 Championship
- USF Pro 2000 Championship
- Indy Lights
- IndyCar Series
