= 2023 Formula 4 United States Championship =

Motor racing competition

The 2023 Formula 4 United States Championship season was the eighth season of the Formula 4 United States Championship, a motor racing series regulated according to FIA Formula 4 regulations and sanctioned by SCCA Pro Racing, the professional racing division of the Sports Car Club of America.

== Teams and drivers ==
Team	No.	Driver	Rounds
(United States) Jensen Global Advisors	1	(United States) Everett Stack	1–4
(United States) Jensen Global Advisors	2	(United States) Landan Matriano Lim	All
(United States) Jensen Global Advisors	22	(United States) Aidan Potter	1–2
(United States) Jay Howard Driver Development	3	(United States) Michael Boyiadzis	1–2, 4–6
(United States) Jay Howard Driver Development	3	(United States) Dane Scott	3
(United States) Jay Howard Driver Development	4	(United States) Dane Scott	1–2
(United States) Jay Howard Driver Development	5	(United States) Tanner DeFabis	All
(United States) Jay Howard Driver Development	6	(United States) Frankie Mossman	1–3
(United States) Jay Howard Driver Development	6	(China) Zhanbin Jia	6
(United States) Jay Howard Driver Development	7	(United States) Eric Wisniewski	All
(United States) Jay Howard Driver Development	19	(United States) Michael Costello	All
(United States) Jay Howard Driver Development	20	(United States) Logan Adams	1–4
(United States) Jay Howard Driver Development	21	(United States) Ava Dobson	3–6
(United States) Scuderia Buell	8	(Argentina) Pablo José Benites	6
(United States) Scuderia Buell	51	(Chile) Nicolás Ambiado	1
(United States) Scuderia Buell	88	(Mexico) Cristian Cantú	3, 6
(United States) Scuderia Buell	91	(Argentina) Luciano Martínez	All
(United States) Gonella Racing	9	(Thailand) Carl Bennett	1–2, 4–5
(United States) Gonella Racing	17	(United States) Tyke Durst	All
(Brazil) Cará Origin Motosports	10	(Brazil) Daniel Cará	All
(United States) Crosslink/Kiwi Motorsport	11	(United States) Cole Kleck	1
(United States) Crosslink/Kiwi Motorsport	14	(United States) Alex Benavitz	All
(United States) Crosslink/Kiwi Motorsport	16	(Australia) Jesse Lacey	All
(United States) Crosslink/Kiwi Motorsport	27	(Canada) Patrick Woods-Toth	All
(United States) Crosslink/Kiwi Motorsport	30	(Australia) Lewis Hodgson	1–3
(United States) Crosslink/Kiwi Motorsport	31	(United States) Titus Sherlock	All
(United States) Crosslink/Kiwi Motorsport	74	(United States) Hannah Greenemeier	All
(United States) Crosslink/Kiwi Motorsport	02	(United States) Jett Bowling	3–6
(United States) Crosslink/Kiwi Motorsport	09	(United States) Madison Aust	1
(United States) Velocity Racing Development	11	(United States) Cole Kleck	2
(United States) Velocity Racing Development	48	(United States) Jimmie Lockhart	1
(United States) Velocity Racing Development	48	(United States) Max Taylor	2
(United States) Momentum Motorsports	12	(United States) Garrett Dettman	1–3
(United States) Momentum Motorsports	23	(Italy) Nico Dal Monte	2
(United States) Doran Motorsports Group	13	(United States) Barrett Wolfe	6
(United States) Doran Motorsports Group	42	(Australia) Daniel Quimby	6
(United States) Doran Motorsports Group	08	(Canada) Alex Berg	1–5
(United States) Era Motorsport	18	(United Kingdom) Matthew Higgins	1–2
(United States) International Motorsport	18	(Israel) Ariel Elkin	6
(United States) International Motorsport	24	(United States) Augusto Soto-Schirripa	2–3, 5–6
(United States) New'T Racing	29	(United States) Kekai Hauanio	All
(United States) Speed Factory	33	(United States) Justin Garat	2
(United States) Bacon Racing	45	(United States) Bacon Zelenka	All
(Canada) Atlantic Racing Team	77	(Canada) James Lawley	3–6
(United States) IGY6 Motorsports	83	(United States) Christopher Parrish	1, 3–6
(United States) Future Star Racing	88	(United States) Robert Torres	1

== Race calendar ==
The 2023 calendar was announced on 9 October 2022.

Round		Circuit	Date	Pole position	Fastest lap	Winning driver	Winning team	Supporting
1	R1	NOLA Motorsports Park, Avondale	11 March	(United States) Michael Costello	(United States) Michael Costello	(Thailand) Carl Bennett	(United States) Gonella Racing	Formula Regional Americas Championship; SVRA; Trans-Am Series
1	R2	NOLA Motorsports Park, Avondale	12 March		(United States) Michael Costello	(United States) Jimmie Lockhart	(United States) Velocity Racing Development	Formula Regional Americas Championship; SVRA; Trans-Am Series
1	R3	NOLA Motorsports Park, Avondale	12 March		(United States) Jimmie Lockhart	(United States) Jimmie Lockhart	(United States) Velocity Racing Development	Formula Regional Americas Championship; SVRA; Trans-Am Series
2	R1	Road America, Elkhart Lake	20 May	(Australia) Jesse Lacey	(Canada) Patrick Woods-Toth	(Canada) Patrick Woods-Toth	(United States) Crosslink/Kiwi Motorsport	Formula Regional Americas Championship; SVRA
2	R2	Road America, Elkhart Lake	21 May		(United States) Michael Costello	(United States) Michael Costello (Note: Mossmann finished first but received a 10 seconds penalty for making a false start and gaining the advantage.Costello inherited the win.)	(United States) Jay Howard Driver Development	Formula Regional Americas Championship; SVRA
2	R3	Road America, Elkhart Lake	21 May		(Thailand) Carl Bennett	(Canada) Patrick Woods-Toth	(United States) Crosslink/Kiwi Motorsport	Formula Regional Americas Championship; SVRA
3	R1	Mid-Ohio Sports Car Course, Lexington	24 June	(Canada) Patrick Woods-Toth (Note: Due to the adverse weather conditions, the qualifying session was replaced by additional free practice. The grid was set by the championship standings.)	(United States) Michael Costello	(United States) Michael Costello	(United States) Jay Howard Driver Development	Formula Regional Americas Championship; SVRA; Trans-Am Series
3	R2	Mid-Ohio Sports Car Course, Lexington	25 June		(United States) Titus Sherlock	(United States) Augusto Soto-Schirripa	(United States) Momentum Motorsports	Formula Regional Americas Championship; SVRA; Trans-Am Series
3	R3	Mid-Ohio Sports Car Course, Lexington	25 June		(Canada) Patrick Woods-Toth	(Canada) Patrick Woods-Toth	(United States) Crosslink/Kiwi Motorsport	Formula Regional Americas Championship; SVRA; Trans-Am Series
4	R1	New Jersey Motorsports Park, Millville	29 July	(Australia) Jesse Lacey	(United States) Michael Costello	(United States) Titus Sherlock (Note: Berg finished first but received a drive through penalty converted to 30 seconds for forcing another driver off the track. Woods-Toth finished second but received a 10 seconds penalty for forcing another driver off the track. Sherlock inherited the win.)	(United States) Crosslink/Kiwi Motorsport	Formula Regional Americas Championship; SVRA
4	R2	New Jersey Motorsports Park, Millville	30 July		(Canada) Alexander Berg	(United States) Michael Costello	(United States) Jay Howard Driver Development	Formula Regional Americas Championship; SVRA
4	R3	New Jersey Motorsports Park, Millville	30 July		(Canada) Alexander Berg	(Canada) Alexander Berg	(United States) Doran Motorsports Group	Formula Regional Americas Championship; SVRA
5	R1	Virginia International Raceway, Alton	7 October	(United States) Michael Costello	(Argentina) Luciano Martínez	(United States) Augusto Soto-Schirripa	(United States) Momentum Motorsports	Formula Regional Americas Championship; SVRA; Trans-Am Series
5	R2	Virginia International Raceway, Alton	7 October		(Australia) Jesse Lacey	(United States) Augusto Soto-Schirripa	(United States) Momentum Motorsports	Formula Regional Americas Championship; SVRA; Trans-Am Series
5	R3	Virginia International Raceway, Alton	8 October		(United States) Augusto Soto-Schirripa	(Australia) Jesse Lacey	(United States) Crosslink/Kiwi Motorsport	Formula Regional Americas Championship; SVRA; Trans-Am Series
6	R1	Circuit of the Americas, Austin	3 November	(United States) Titus Sherlock	(Israel) Ariel Elkin	(United States) Titus Sherlock	(United States) Crosslink/Kiwi Motorsport	Formula Regional Americas Championship; SVRA; Trans-Am Series
6	R2	Circuit of the Americas, Austin	3 November		(United States) Titus Sherlock	(United States) Augusto Soto-Schirripa	(United States) Momentum Motorsports	Formula Regional Americas Championship; SVRA; Trans-Am Series
6	R3	Circuit of the Americas, Austin	4 November		(Australia) Jesse Lacey	(Canada) Patrick Woods-Toth	(United States) Crosslink/Kiwi Motorsport	Formula Regional Americas Championship; SVRA; Trans-Am Series

== Championship standings ==
Points were awarded as follows:

Position	**1st**	**2nd**	**3rd**	**4th**	**5th**	**6th**	**7th**	**8th**	**9th**	**10th**
Points	25	18	15	12	10	8	6	4	2	1

=== Drivers' standings ===
Pos	Driver	NOL			ROA			MOH			NJM			VIR			COA			Pts
Pos	Driver	R1	R2	R3	R1	R2 (Note: Half points were awarded as the leader completed insufficient number of laps under green flag conditions.)	R3	R1	R2	R3	R1	R2	R3	R1	R2	R3	R1	R2	R3	Pts
1	(Canada) Patrick Woods-Toth	2	3	3	1	5	1	**5**	3	1	5	2	3	3	15	3	3	3	1	263.5
2	(United States) Titus Sherlock	3	7	10	7	4	5	12	4	7	1	4	2	6	4	5	**1**	5	8	181
3	(United States) Augusto Soto-Schirripa				14	7	6	21	1	2				1	1	15	2	1	3	158
4	(Australia) Jesse Lacey	4	2	8	**2**	2	3	7	8	9	**9**	5	7	12	16	1	6	6	2	154.5
5	(United States) Michael Costello	**29**	4	2	4	1	14	1	2	6	4	1	4	**14**	14	17	7	Ret	22	148
6	(Brazil) Daniel Cará	24	6	7	15	15	10	4	6	16	2	3	5	4	2	4	5	4	5	145.5
7	(Canada) Alex Berg	5	9	6	5	3	4	2	5	4	8	7	1	2	Ret	Ret				127.5
8	(United States) Kekai Hauanio	8	16	9	Ret	18	22	13	11	Ret	6	12	Ret	5	3	2	9	9	4	73
9	(Australia) Lewis Hodgson	10	5	4	8	26	Ret	3	7	3										55.5
10	(United States) Jimmie Lockhart	28	1	1																50
11	(United States) Frankie Mossman	18	10	5	3	10	2	Ret	27	5										45.5
12	(United States) Bacon Zelenka	22	20	23	22	16	8	16	13	12	3	8	12	18	8	7	15	11	6	39
13	(Thailand) Carl Bennett	1	8	21	6	11	13				15	19	11	Ret	DNS	11				37
14	(Israel) Ariel Elkin																4	2	9	32
15	(United States) Alex Benavitz	14	22	15	Ret	22	Ret	14	10	11	22	17	6	10	5	6	11	13	Ret	28
16	(Argentina) Luciano Martínez	13	14	14	24	27	Ret	8	12	14	13	6	8	9	7	13	16	20	12	22
17	(United States) Hannah Greenemeier	12	11	16	Ret	Ret	Ret	Ret	18	15	11	Ret	10	7	6	9	12	12	11	17
18	(United States) Tyke Durst	9	23	Ret	10	Ret	9	10	14	8	10	9	20	19	17	16	10	8	20	16.5
19	(United States) Garrett Dettman	6	24	12	19	17	21	6	23	26										12
20	(United States) Michael Boyiadzis	7	27	Ret	16	8	EX				21	10	13	20	10	Ret	23	DNS	Ret	10
21	(Australia) Daniel Quimby																8	7	14	10
22	(United States) Logan Adams	Ret	Ret	Ret	11	9	23	11	9	10	7	21	Ret							10
23	(Canada) James Lawley							17	16	21	20	18	9	15	9	14	24	15	7	10
24	(United States) Tanner DeFabis	15	26	18	13	14	17	9	15	13	17	11	19	8	12	12	Ret	DNS	17	5
25	(United States) Max Taylor				12	6	15													4
26	(United States) Christopher Parrish	16	Ret	19				23	25	22	18	Ret	15	16	Ret	8	Ret	DNS	18	4
27	(United Kingdom) Matthew Higgins	11	DNS	26	17	23	7													3
28	(United States) Cole Kleck	23	15	11	9	13	11													2
29	(Mexico) Cristian Cantú							20	17	17							13	10	10	2
30	(United States) Jett Bowling							22	26	18	23	16	14	Ret	11	10	18	19	16	1
31	(United States) Ava Dobson							24	24	24	14	20	17	11	18	Ret	19	16	13	0
32	(United States) Eric Wisniewski	26	25	27	23	12	12	Ret	21	25	16	13	16	13	Ret	Ret	21	DNS	23	0
33	(United States) Everett Stack	25	DNS	25	26	Ret	19	19	22	23	12	15	21							0
34	(United States) Madison Aust	17	12	28																0
35	(United States) Landan Matriano Lim	19	19	17	20	20	18	15	19	19	19	14	18	17	13	18	20	18	19	0
36	(United States) Dane Scott	27	13	22	25	25	16	18	20	20										0
37	(Chile) Nicolás Ambiado	Ret	17	13																0
38	(Argentina) Pablo José Benites																14	14	15	0
39	(United States) Barrett Wolfe																17	17	Ret	0
40	(United States) Aidan Potter	20	18	20	27	19	Ret													0
41	(United States) Justin Garat				18	24	Ret													0
42	(Italy) Nico Dal Monte				21	21	20													0
43	(United States) Robert Torres	21	21	24																0
44	(China) Zhanbin Jia																22	Ret	21	0
Pos	Driver	R1	R2	R3	R1	R2	R3	R1	R2	R3	R1	R2	R3	R1	R2	R3	R1	R2	R3	Pts
Pos	Driver	NOL			ROA			MOH			NJM			VIR			COA			Pts

Colour	Result
Gold	Winner
Silver	Second place
Bronze	Third place
Green	Points classification
Blue	Non-points classification
Blue	Non-classified finish (NC)
Purple	Retired, not classified (Ret)
Red	Did not qualify (DNQ)
Red	Did not pre-qualify (DNPQ)
Black	Disqualified (DSQ)
White	Did not start (DNS)
White	Withdrew (WD)
White	Race cancelled (C)
Blank	Did not practice (DNP)
Blank	Did not arrive (DNA)
Blank	Excluded (EX)

**Bold** – Pole
Italics – Fastest Lap

=== Teams' standings ===
Each team acquired the points earned by their two best drivers in each race.

Pos	Team	Pts
1	(United States) Crosslink/Kiwi Motorsport	541.5
2	(United States) Jay Howard Driver Development	216
3	(United States) International Motorsport	190
4	(Brazil) Cará Origin Motosports	145.5
5	(United States) Doran Motorsports Group	137.5
6	(United States) New'T Racing	73
7	(United States) Velocity Racing Development	56
8	(United States) Gonella Racing	53.5
9	(United States) Bacon Racing	39
10	(United States) Scuderia Buell	23
11	(United States) Momentum Motorsports	13
12	(Canada) Atlantic Racing Team	10
13	(United States) IGY6 Motorsports	4
14	(United States) Era Motorsport	3
15	(United States) Jensen Global Advisors	0
16	(United States) Speed Factory	0
17	(United States) Future Star Racing	0
