= 2026 New Zealand Grand Prix =

- Race 3, Round 4 of 4 of the 2026 Formula Regional Oceania Trophy
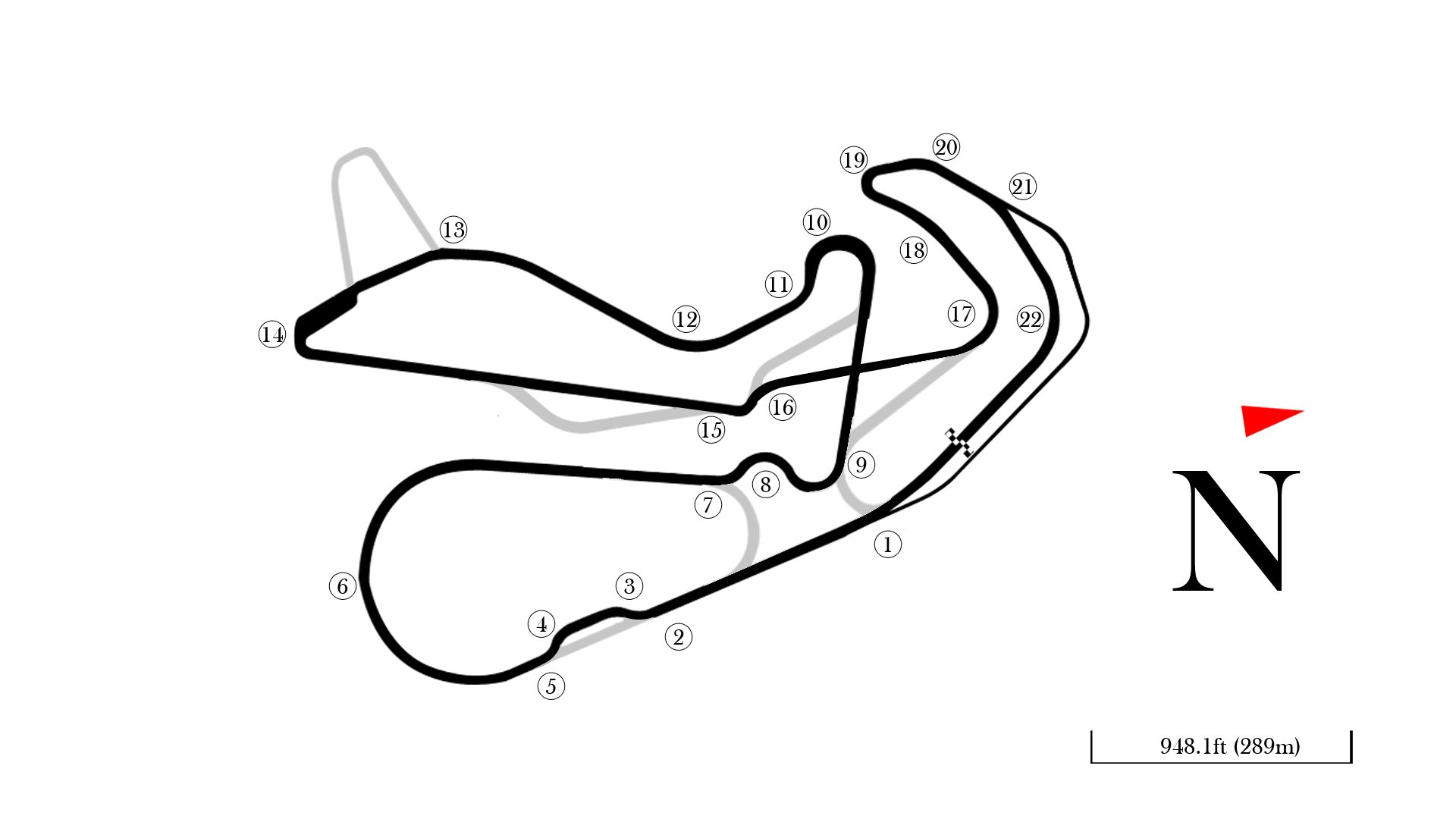

Race details
- Date: 1 February 2026
- Official name: LXX New Zealand Grand Prix
- Location: Highlands Motorsport Park, Cromwell, New Zealand
- Course: Permanent racing facility
- Course length: 4.100 km (2.548 miles)
- Distance: 27 laps, 114.8 km (71.3 miles)
- Weather: Sunny

Pole position
Driver	(Japan) Jin Nakamura	Hitech TGR
- Time: 1:28.339

Fastest lap
Driver	(New Zealand) Zack Scoular	mtec Motorsport
- Time: 1:29.104

Podium
First	(New Zealand) Zack Scoular	mtec Motorsport
Second	(Japan) Jin Nakamura	Hitech TGR
Third	(Japan) Kanato Le	Hitech TGR

The 2026 New Zealand Grand Prix (officially known as the NAPA 70th New Zealand Grand Prix) was an event for open wheel racing cars held at Highlands Motorsport Park in Cromwell, Otago on 1 February 2026. It was the seventieth New Zealand Grand Prix and utilised Formula Regional cars. The event served as the final race of the 2026 Formula Regional Oceania Trophy.

The race was won by New Zealander Zack Scoular while Hitech TGR drivers Jin Nakamura and Kanato Le rounded out the podium. Nakamura achieved pole position earlier that weekend while Scoular took fastest lap honours during the race.

Elsewhere, Ugo Ugochukwu would take the 2026 Formula Regional Oceania Trophy title, becoming the first American in the series' history to do so.

== Background ==
The event was held at Highlands Motorsport Park in Cromwell for the third time in the circuit's history, across the weekend of 30 January–1 February. The Grand Prix was the final race of the final round of the 2026 Formula Regional Oceania Trophy and the 70th running of the New Zealand Grand Prix.

Heading into the weekend, six drivers were in contention for the overall Formula Regional Oceania Trophy title. American Ugo Ugochukwu led the championship standings by 22 points over Audi Formula 1 junior driver, Freddie Slater. Owing to inclement weather conditions in the final race of the previous round in Teretonga, an additional race was positioned on Friday. Slater took victory in said race, closing the points deficit to Ugochukwu by four points.

Outside of the 19-driver contingent that competed throughout the FROT season, only one other driver (Liam Sceats) signed on to compete in the Grand Prix. Sceats had previously won the Grand Prix in the first iteration at Highlands in 2024.

== Qualifying ==
Qualifying was held on 31 January 2026, at 11:43 local time (UTC+12:00)

=== Qualifying classification ===
Pos.	No.	Driver	Team	Qualifying times			Final grid
Pos.	No.	Driver	Team	Q1	Q2	Q3	Final grid
1	12	(Japan) Jin Nakamura	Hitech TGR	1:28.704	1:28.940	1:28.339	1
2	40	(New Zealand) Ryan Wood	mtec Motorsport	1:28.796	1:28.762	1:28.439	7
3	4	(United States) Ugo Ugochukwu	M2 Competition	1:28.718	1:28.918	1:28.487	13^{1}
4	3	(New Zealand) Zack Scoular	mtec Motorsport	1:28.790	1:28.702	1:28.554	2
5	19	(Japan) Kanato Le	Hitech TGR	1:29.032	1:28.639	1:28.556	3
6	27	(United Kingdom) Freddie Slater	M2 Competition	1:28.821	1:28.486	1:28.599	4
7	11	(New Zealand) Louis Sharp	mtec Motorsport	1:28.718	1:28.943	1:28.625	5
8	23	(New Zealand) Liam Sceats	HMD Motorsports with TJ Speed	1:28.930	1:28.764	1:28.646	6
9	24	(Mexico) Ernesto Rivera	M2 Competition	1:29.008	1:29.070	N/A	Wth
10	22	(New Zealand) Sebastian Manson	M2 Competition	1:29.158	1:29.070	N/A	8
11	13	(Australia) James Wharton	HMD Motorsports with TJ Speed	1:28.946	1:29.073	N/A	9
12	52	(United States) Nolan Allaer	Giles Motorsport	1:29.011	1:29.133	N/A	10
13	5	(China) Yuanpu Cui	mtec Motorsport	1:29.149	1:29.186	N/A	11
14	21	(Sri Lanka) Yevan David	Kiwi Motorsport	1:29.137	1:29.423	N/A	12
15	33	(Republic of Ireland) Fionn McLaughlin	Hitech TGR	1:29.400	N/A	N/A	14
16	14	(United States) Cooper Shipman	Kiwi Motorsport	1:29.521	N/A	N/A	15
17	41	(Brazil) Ricardo Baptista	HMD Motorsports with TJ Speed	1:29.545	N/A	N/A	16
18	50	(Australia) Jack Taylor	Giles Motorsport	1:29.678	N/A	N/A	17
19	8	(United States) Trevor LaTourrette	HMD Motorsports with TJ Speed	1:30.713	N/A	N/A	18

Notes

- ^1 – Ugo Ugochukwu qualified 3rd, but was required to start the race from fourteenth for a technical breach relating to wishbone covers.

== Race ==
The race was be held on 1 February 2026, at 16:33 local time (UTC+12:00), and ran for 27 laps.

Pos.	No.	Driver	Teams	Laps	Time/Retired	Grid
1	3	(New Zealand) Zack Scoular	mtec Motorsport	27	50min 22.958sec	2
2	12	(Japan) Jin Nakamura	Hitech TGR	27	+ 0.434	1
3	19	(Japan) Kanato Le	Hitech TGR	27	+ 0.807	3
4	27	(United Kingdom) Freddie Slater	M2 Competition	27	+ 1.280	4
5	40	(New Zealand) Ryan Wood	mtec Motorsport	27	+ 2.163	7
6	11	(New Zealand) Louis Sharp	mtec Motorsport	27	+ 2.796	5
7	23	(New Zealand) Liam Sceats	HMD Motorsports with TJ Speed	27	+ 3.491	6
8	13	(Australia) James Wharton	HMD Motorsports with TJ Speed	27	+ 4.059	9
9	4	(United States) Ugo Ugochukwu	M2 Competition	27	+ 4.639	13
10	22	(New Zealand) Sebastian Manson	M2 Competition	27	+ 5.005	8
11	33	(Republic of Ireland) Fionn McLaughlin	Hitech TGR	27	+ 5.309	14
12	41	(Brazil) Ricardo Baptista	HMD Motorsports with TJ Speed	27	+ 5.921	16
13	5	(China) Yuanpu Cui	mtec Motorsport	27	+ 8.229	11
14	21	(Sri Lanka) Yevan David	Kiwi Motorsport	27	+ 11.322	12
15	52	(United States) Nolan Allaer	Giles Motorsport	26	+ 1 lap	10
Ret	8	(United States) Trevor LaTourrette	HMD Motorsports with TJ Speed	25	Accident	18
Ret	14	(United States) Cooper Shipman	Kiwi Motorsport	24	Spun off	15
Ret	50	(Australia) Jack Taylor	Giles Motorsport	10	Accident	18
Wth	24	(Mexico) Ernesto Rivera	M2 Competition	0	Withdrew	
Wth	69	(Finland) Kalle Rovanperä	Hitech TGR	0	Withdrew	
Fastest lap: (New Zealand) Zack Scoular (mtec Motorsport) – 1:29.104 (lap 19)

Preceded by 2025 New Zealand Grand Prix	New Zealand Grand Prix; 2026	Succeeded by 2027 New Zealand Grand Prix
