= Sebastian Manson =

New Zealand racing driver (born 2008)

- Nationality: (New Zealand) New Zealander
- Born: 7 February 2008 (age 18)

USF Pro 2000 Championship career
- Debut season: 2025
- Current team: Turn 3 Motorsport
- Car number: 22
- Former teams: TJ Speed Motorsports
- Starts: 0
- Wins: 0
- Podiums: 0
- Poles: 0
- Fastest laps: 0
- Best finish: 12th in 2025

Previous series
- 2024 2024–2026 2022-2024: FR Japanese; FR Oceania; NZ Formula Ford Championship

Sebastian Manson (born 7 February 2008) is a racing driver from New Zealand who is set to compete in the USF Pro 2000 Championship with Turn 3 Motorsport.

Manson previously competed in the 2024 Formula Regional Japanese Championship.

== Career ==
=== Karting ===
Manson has had a decorated karting career in his country, with two major titles coming in 2020 and 2022. He competed in karting in 2022 and 2023, whilst also competing in Formula Ford.

=== Formula Ford ===
==== 2022 ====
Manson debuted in Formula Ford in 2022, at the age of fourteen. His best championship results were finishing fourth in both the North Island Series and the Manfeild Winter Series. In the latter series, he managed three wins from six races, as well as four podiums.

==== 2023 ====
In 2023, Manson had a campaign that largely resembled his 2022, once again with two fourth-placed finishes in the New Zealand Championship and also in the Manfeild Winter Series.

==== 2024 ====
Manson had a successful 2024, and overall he amassed 29 wins across the New Zealand Championship and the North and South Island Series. This also proved to be a breakthrough year for Manson, as he won eight and recorded twelve podiums in the North Island Series, and has already finished second in the New Zealand Championship, and won the South Island Series.

=== Formula Regional ===
==== 2024 ====
In early 2024, it was announced that Manson would be contesting the final two rounds of the 2024 Formula Regional Oceania Championship, with Giles Motorsport, as he turned sixteen and was eligible for the championship. He competed in the New Zealand Grand Prix weekend, with a best result of eighth at Highlands Motorsport Park. Manson was then selected by the Birth Racing Project alongside Aussie Jesse Lacey to race in the 2024 Formula Regional Japanese Championship. He secured his first pole position at Sugo, in the second round of the championship.

==== 2026 ====
During pre-season, Manson raced in the Formula Regional Oceania Trophy with M2 Competition.

=== USF Pro 2000 Championship ===
==== 2025 ====
On December 17, 2024, it was announced Manson would join the 2025 grid with TJ Speed Motorsports.

==== 2026 ====
Manson will remain in USF Pro 2000 for 2026, moving to Turn 3 Motorsport.

== Karting record ==
=== Karting career summary ===
Season	Series	Team	Position
2015	Kartsport NZ National Sprint Championship - Cadet		15th
2015	Kartsport NZ North Island Sprint Championship - Cadet		15th
2015	Kartsport Auckland Club Point Series - Cadet Raket		6th
2015	Kartsport Auckland Club Point Series - Cadet Rok		7th
2015	47th Blossom Festival - Cadet		8th
2016	Kartsport NZ National Sprint Championship - Cadet		14th
2016	Kartsport NZ North Island Sprint Championship - Cadet		5th
2016	Kartsport Auckland Club Point Series - Cadet Rok		5th
2016	Kartsport Auckland Club Point Series - Cadet Raket		4th
2016	Kartsport NZ National Schools Championship - Cadet		6th
2016	48th Blossom Festival - Cadet		8th
2017	Kartsport NZ National Sprint Championship - Cadet		8th
2017	NZ Top Half Series - Mini Rok		NC
2017	Kartsport Auckland Club Point Series - Cadet Rok		3rd
2017	Kartsport Auckland City of Sails - Cadet Rok		5th
2017	Kartsport NZ National Schools Championship - Cadet		7th
2017	49th Blossom Festival - Mini Rok		6th
2018	Kartsport NZ National Sprint Championship - Mini Rok		3rd
2018	Kartsport Auckland Club Point Series - Mini Rok		5th
2018	Kartsport NZ National Schools Championship - Mini Rok		5th
2018	Kartsport Auckland Regional Schools Championship - Mini Rok		2nd
2019	Kartsport NZ National Sprint Championship - Mini Rok		23rd
2019	Rotax Max Challenge Grand Finals - Mini Max	Luke Manson	5th
2019	Kartsport NZ National Schools Championship - Mini Rok		3rd
2020	Kartsport Auckland City of Sails - Rotax Junior		7th
2020	Kartsport NZ North Island Sprint Championship - Rotax Junior		7th
2020	52nd Blossom Festival - Rotax Junior		1st
2021	Kartsport Auckland City of Sails - Rotax Junior		2nd
2021	Kartsport NZ National Sprint Championship - Rotax Junior		2nd
2021	Kartsport NZ National Schools Championship - Rotax Junior		16th
2021	NZ Top Half Series - Rotax Junior		NC
2021	Kartsport Auckland Club Point Series - Rotax Junior		7th
2021	Kartsport NZ National Schools Championship - Junior Rok		2nd
2022	Kartsport Auckland City of Sails - Rotax Junior		5th
2022	Kartsport Auckland City of Sails - Junior Rok		4th
2022	CIK Trophy of New Zealand - Junior Rok		1st
2022	Kartsport NZ National Sprint Championship - Rotax Junior		11th
2022	NZ Top Half Series - Rotax Junior		32nd
2022	Kartsport Auckland Club Point Series - Rotax Junior		12th
2022	Australian Kart Championship - KA2		33rd
2022	Kartsport NZ National Sprint Championship - Junior Rok		7th
2022	WSK Final Cup - OK	IPK Official Racing Team	38th
2023	Kartsport Auckland City of Sails - KZ2	Manson Racing	8th
2023	Kartsport NZ National Sprint Championship - Rotax Light		25th
2023	Kartsport NZ National Sprint Championship - KZ2		5th
2023	Kartstars New Zealand - Rotax Light		46th
2023	Kartstars New Zealand - Senior Rok		17th
2023	Kartstars New Zealand - KZ2		14th
2023	Kartsport NZ National Schools Championship - Rotax Light	Saint Kentigern College	2nd
2023	Kartsport NZ National Sprint Championship - Senior Rok		11th
2023	Kartsport Auckland Club Point Series - Rotax Light		32nd
2023	Kartsport Auckland Club Point Series - KZ2		3rd

== Racing record ==
=== Racing career summary ===
Season	Series	Team	Races	Wins	Poles	F/Laps	Podiums	Points	Position
2022	North Island Formula Ford Series		13	1	0	1	6	671	4th
2022	South Island Formula Ford Championship		4	0	0	0	0	114	27th
2022	NZ Formula Ford Championship		8	0	0	0	1	312	7th
2022	Formula Ford Manfeild Winter Series		6	3	1	2	4	324	4th
2023	South Island F1600 Championship		11	0	0	1	0	514	9th
2023	NZ Formula Ford Championship		16	0	1	1	4	834	4th
2023	Formula Ford Manfeild Winter Series		6	2	0	1	6	418	4th
2024	South Island Formula Ford Championship		18	14	4	10	14	1153	**1st**
2024	North Island Formula Ford Series		13	8	2	5	12	656	7th
2024	Formula Regional Oceania Championship	Giles Motorsport	5	0	0	0	0	43	21st
2024	NZ Formula Ford Championship		14	7	3	6	11	888	**2nd**
2024	Summerset GT New Zealand Championship - Open Class		3	0	0	0	1	0	16th
2024	Formula Regional Japanese Championship	Birth Racing Project	14	0	2	1	6	155	**2nd**
2024	GVI Formula Open NZ		3	1	0	1	3	N/A	NC†
2025	Formula Regional Oceania Championship	M2 Competition	15	2	0	0	2	225	6th
2025	Tasman Series	M2 Competition	6	1	0	0	0	83	4th
2025	USF Pro 2000 Championship	TJ Speed Motorsports	18	0	0	0	0	152	12th
2026	Formula Regional Oceania Trophy	M2 Competition	15	0	0	0	0	105	17th
2026	Tasman Series	M2 Competition	15	0	0	0	0	105	6th
2026	USF Pro 2000 Championship	Turn 3 Motorsport	18	0	0	0	0	185	10th

† - As Manson was a guest driver, he was ineligible for championship points.

=== Complete Formula Regional Oceania Championship/Trophy results ===
(key) (Races in bold indicate pole position) (Races in italics indicate fastest lap)

Year	Team	1	2	3	4	5	6	7	8	9	10	11	12	13	14	15	16	DC	Points
2024	Giles Motorsport	TAU; 1	TAU; 2	TAU; 3	MAN; 1	MAN; 2	MAN; 3	HMP; 1	HMP; 2	HMP; 3	RUA; 1 DNS	RUA; 2; 11	RUA; 3; 12	HIG; 1; 10	HIG; 2; 8	NZGP; 3; 12		21st	43
2025	M2 Competition	TAU; 1; 10	TAU; 2; 7	TAU; 3; 9	HMP; 1; 7	HMP; 2; 1	HMP; 3; 10	MAN; 1; 6	MAN; 2 Ret	MAN; 3; 4	TER; 1; 7	TER; 2; 1	TER; 3; 7	HIG; 1; 9	HIG; 2; 5	NZGP; 3; 9		6th	225
2026	M2 Competition	HMP; 1; 12	HMP; 2; 16	HMP; 3; 6	HMP; 4 Ret	TAU; 1; 13	TAU; 2; 17	TAU; 3; 17	TAU; 4; 10	TER; 1; 10	TER; 2; 6	TER; 3 C	TER; 4 Ret	HIG; 1; 13	HIG; 2; 11	HIG; 3 Ret	NZGP; 4; 10	17th	105

=== Complete New Zealand Grand Prix results ===
Year	Team	Car	Qualifying	Main race
2024	(New Zealand) Giles Motorsport	Tatuus FT-60 - Toyota	13th	12th
2025	(New Zealand) M2 Competition	Tatuus FT-60 - Toyota	13th	9th
2026	(New Zealand) M2 Competition	Tatuus FT-60 - Toyota	8th	10th

=== Complete Formula Regional Japanese Championship results ===
(key) (Races in bold indicate pole position) (Races in italics indicate fastest lap)

Year	Entrant	1	2	3	4	5	6	7	8	9	10	11	12	13	14	Pos	Points
2024	Birth Racing Project 【BRP】	SUZ; 1 Ret	SUZ; 2; 5	SUZ; 3; 3	SUG; 1; 5	**SUG**; **2**; 2	OKA; 1; 4	OKA; 2; 3	OKA; 3; 2	**MOT**; **1**; 6	MOT; 2; 2	FUJ1; 1; 3	FUJ1; 2; 6	FUJ2; 1; 8	FUJ2; 2; 8	2nd	155

=== American open-wheel racing results ===
==== USF Pro 2000 Championship ====
(key) (Races in bold indicate pole position) (Races in italics indicate fastest lap)

Year	Team	1	2	3	4	5	6	7	8	9	10	11	12	13	14	15	16	17	18	Position	Points
2025	TJ Speed Motorsports	STP; 1; 19	STP; 2; 8	LOU; 1; 16	LOU; 2; 13	LOU; 3; 11	IMS; 1; 8	IMS; 2; 21	IMS; 3; 7	IRP; 14	ROA; 1; 12	ROA; 2; 17	ROA; 3; 13	MOH; 1; 9	MOH; 2; 16	TOR; 1; 16	TOR; 2; 18	POR; 1; 9	POR; 2; 5	12th	152
2026	Turn 3 Motorsport	ARL; 1; 22	ARL; 2; 16	IMS; 1; 19	IMS; 2; 4	IRP; 15	ROA; 1; 15	ROA; 2; 10	MOH; 1; 8	MOH; 2; 9	MOH; 3; 9	POR; 1; 9	POR; 2; 12	MAR; 1; 7	MAR; 2; 4	MIL; 18	ROA; 1; 6	ROA; 2; 8	ROA; 3; 15	10th	185

* Season still in progress.
