= Enzo Yeh =

Taiwanese racing driver (born 2008)

- 葉睿恆
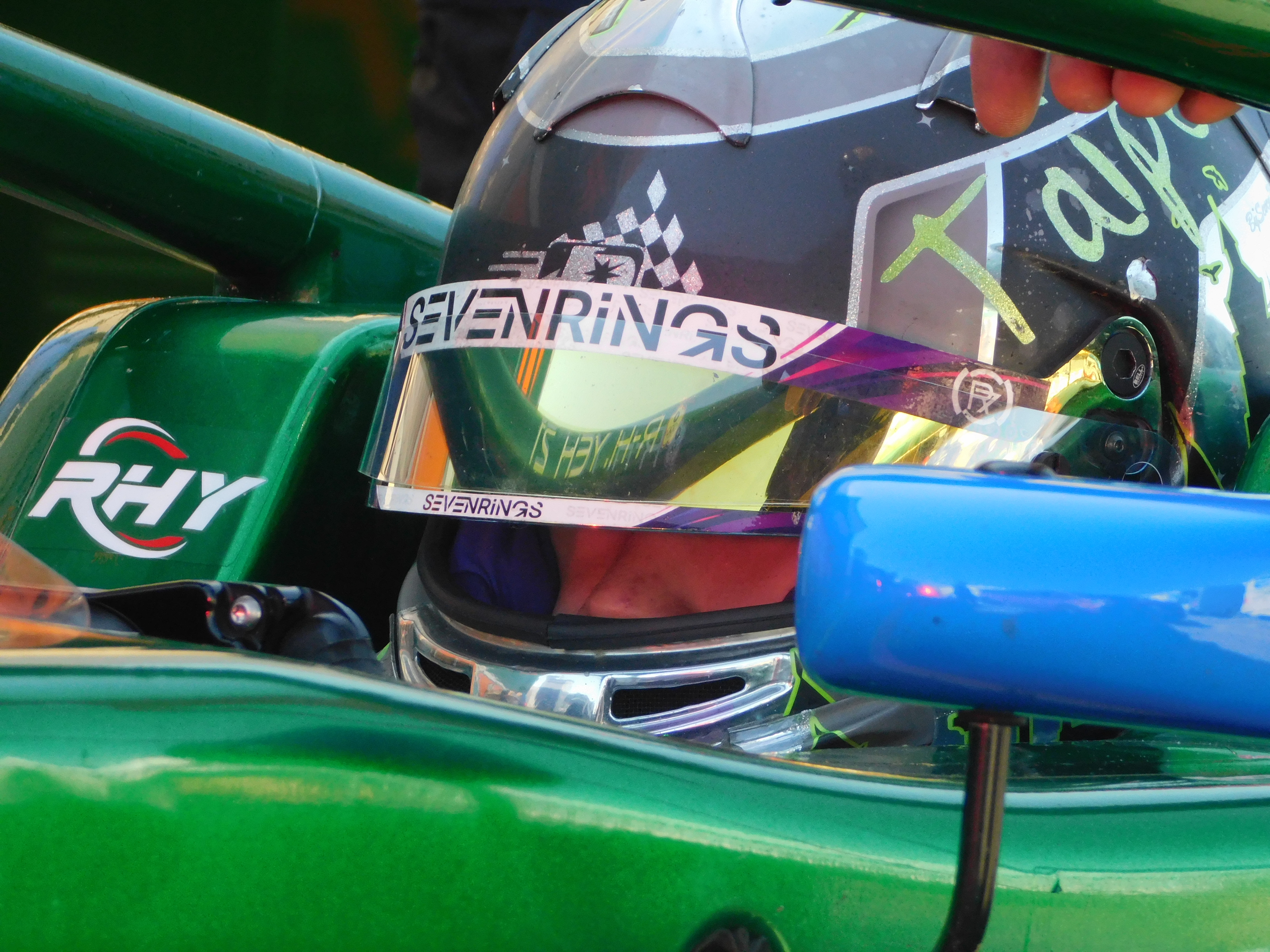
- Yeh in 2025
- Born: Rui-heng Yeh; 21 September 2008 (age 18); Taipei, Taiwan
- Nationality: Chinese Taipei (Note: Yeh is Taiwanese and competes under the "Chinese Taipei" flag, which is used by the FIA to designate drivers licensed by the Chinese Taipei Automobile Federation.)

Euroformula Open Championship career
- Debut season: 2025
- Current team: Team Motopark
- Car number: 21
- Starts: 30
- Wins: 10
- Podiums: 18
- Poles: 2
- Fastest laps: 6
- Best finish: 1st in 2026

Previous series
- 2025; 2025; 2024; 2024; 2024; 2023: FR European; FR Oceania; F4 UAE; Italian F4; Euro 4; F4 South East Asia

Championship titles
- 2026: Euroformula Open Championship

Awards
- 2016, 2019: CAMF Newcomer Award
- Statistics up to date as of 27 October 2026.

Chinese name
- Traditional Chinese: 葉睿恆
- Simplified Chinese: 叶睿恒
Transcriptions
Standard Mandarin
- Hanyu Pinyin: Yè Ruìhéng

Rui-heng "Enzo" Yeh (Chinese: 葉睿恆; pinyin: Yè Ruìhéng; born 21 September 2008) is a Taiwanese racing driver who last competed in the Euroformula Open Championship for Team Motopark.

Born and raised in Taipei, Yeh began competitive kart racing aged seven, winning several national titles in China. He progressed to Formula 4 in 2023, contesting the South East Asia Championship for Asia Racing Team. After a further season in the UAE, Italian, and Euro 4 Championships with R-ace GP, Yeh graduated to Formula Regional in Oceania and Europe.

== Career ==
=== Karting ===
Yeh had a successful karting career in Asia. In 2016, he won the newcomer award in that year's China Racing Gold Champagne Awards after winning the Rotax Max Challenge China in the Micro B class in 2016. In 2019, Yeh won the same award after winning the China Karting Championship in the Cadet class and by representing China in the IAME International Final. In the same year, he was runner-up to William Go in the Asian Karting Open Championship in Mini Rok. In 2020, Yeh won the China Karting Championship in the Junior class, before moving to the Senior class for 2021 and 2022, winning the championship both times. He also was champion in the National Karting Club Championship, winning the Junior class in 2021 and the Open class in 2022.

=== Formula 4 ===
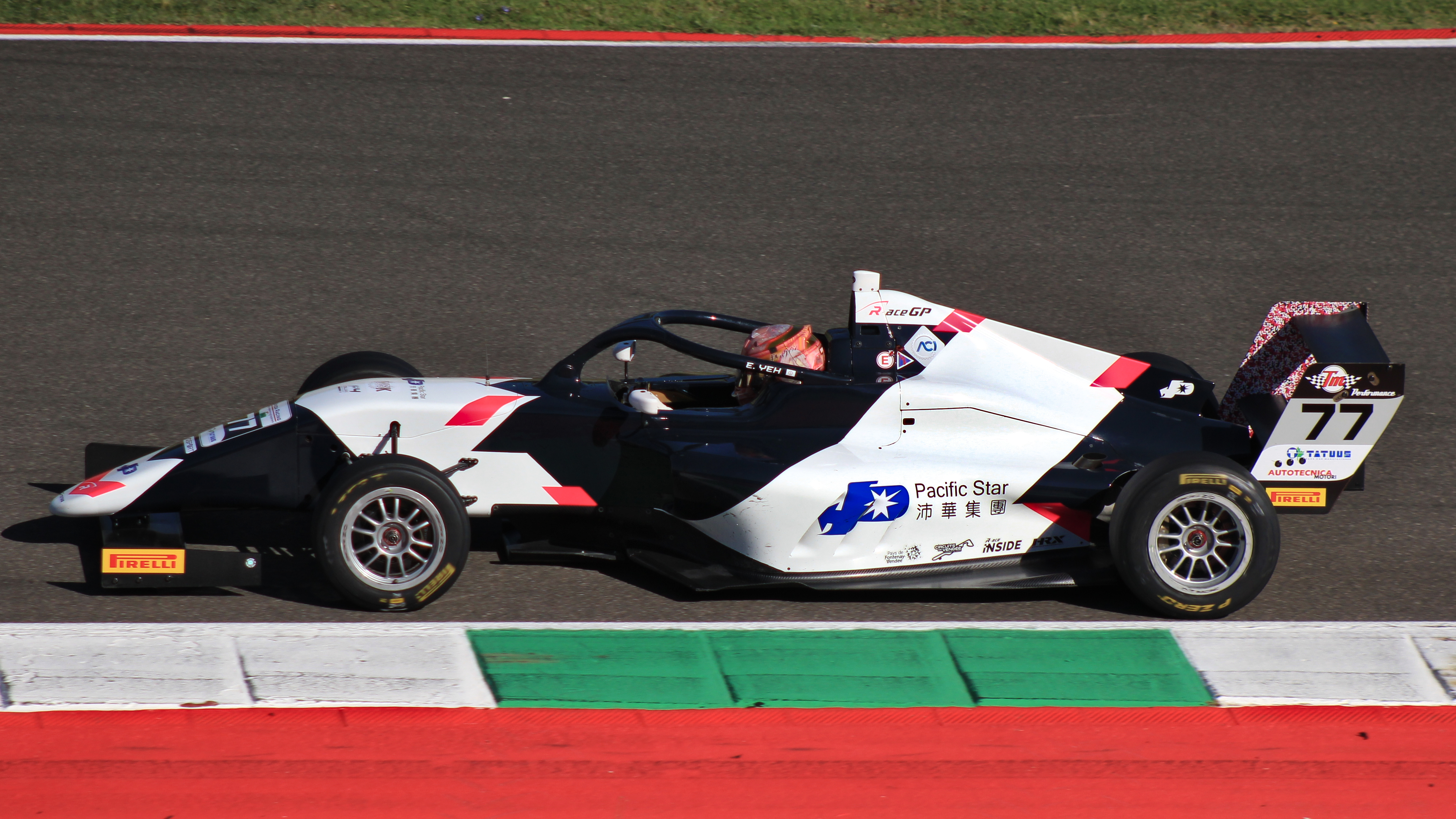
Yeh driving at the Mugello Circuit during the 2024 Italian F4 Championship

==== 2023 ====
Yeh made his car racing debut in the Formula 4 South East Asia Championship for Asia Racing Team. Despite missing the Zhuzhou round as he participated in the Ferrari Scouting World Final, he achieved one podium finish at Sepang, and completed the season as seventh overall and third in the rookies.

==== 2024 ====
During the winter of 2024, Yeh raced in the 2024 Formula 4 UAE Championship for R-ace GP. He scored a third-place finish in the reverse-grid race of the third Yas Marina round and finished 14th in the standings. After testing for R-ace GP ahead of the Italian F4 season, Yeh joined Luka Sammalisto in the French team's two-car operation for the Italian F4 and Euro 4 Championships. He finished Italian F4 in 23rd, scoring six points with a seventh place finish at Misano. In Euro 4, he did not secure any points.

=== Formula Regional ===
==== 2025 ====
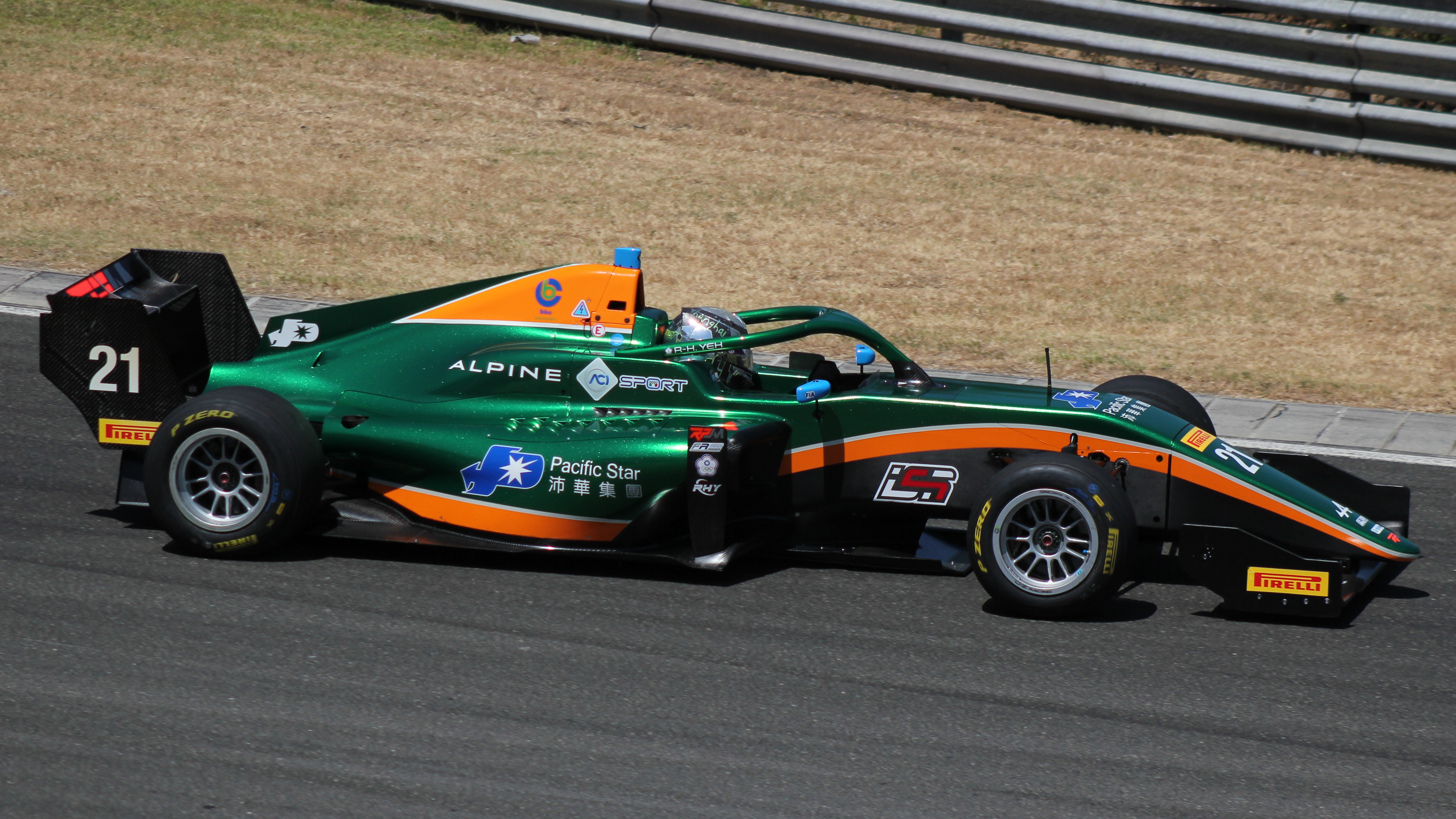
Yeh driving at the Hungaroring during the 2025 Formula Regional European Championship

At the start of 2025, Yeh joined M2 Competition to compete in the Formula Regional Oceania Championship. In his first weekend at Taupo, Yeh qualified ninth for race one and gained two positions to open the season with a seventh-place finish. In race two, Yeh finished second on the road behind Matías Zagazeta but was given a five-second penalty for jumping the start and was relegated to fourth. After qualifying eighth for race three, Yeh went off-track during the race and fell to 16th. After a difficult weekend at Hampton Downs where he only managed a best result of 11th, Yeh equalled his best result up to that point, taking fourth-place in race two at Manfeild. Having qualified sixth for race three, Yeh held off Tommy Smith to maintain sixth-place at the checkered flag. In the following round at Teretonga Park, Yeh started off the weekend by finishing eighth in race one. Starting on reverse grid pole in race two, Yeh fell to fourth at the start, but was able to hold off Josh Pierson to finish fourth. In the final round of the season at Highlands, Yeh had another difficult weekend, finishing no better than 11th and retiring from the New Zealand Grand Prix after colliding with James Lawley.

For his main campaign, Yeh joined RPM to contest the Formula Regional European Championship. Racing in the first six rounds, Yeh scored a best result of 11th in race one at Imola before leaving the team and series ahead of the round at the Red Bull Ring. Following that, Yeh contested the last two rounds of the Euroformula Open Championship for BVM Racing, scoring a best result of fourth in race two at Monza. At the end of the year, Yeh raced in the Macau Grand Prix for PHM Racing, finishing 15th in the main event.

==== 2026 ====
Yeh continued in Euroformula Open for the following year, joining Team Motopark for his maiden full-time season in the series. Starting out the season with five wins between the Algarve and Spa rounds to take an early lead, Yeh then won at the Hungaroring and scored five other podiums between the Misano and Le Castellet rounds to extend his points lead. Following that, Yeh won at the Hockenheimring and finished third in the other two races, before clinching the title at Monza and taking three wins in the last four races to end off the campaign.

== Karting record ==
=== Karting career summary ===
Season	Series	Team	Position
2016	Rotax Max Challenge China — Micro B		1st
2017	ROK Cup International Final — Mini Rok	Autoeuropeo Motorsport	NC
2017	Top Speed All-Star Karting Challenge — Cadet A	CFS	2nd
2017	Rotax Max Challenge Mizunami Series — Micro Max	China Future Speed	5th
2018	Asian Karting Championship — Mini Rok		1st
2018	China Karting Championship — Mini		NC
2018	Rotax Max Challenge Mizunami Series — Micro Max	China Future Speed	7th
2018	Rotax Max Challenge Mizunami Series — Mini Max	China Future Speed	6th
2019	Macao International Kart Grand Prix — Mini Rok	Mars Racing Team	7th
2019	IAME International Final — X30 Mini		8th
2019	Asian Karting Open Championship — Mini Rok		2nd
2019	China Karting Championship — Cadet		1st
2019	Rotax Max Challenge Mizunami Series — Mini Max	China Future Speed	2nd
2019	Rotax Max Challenge Mizunami Series — Junior Max	China Future Speed	15th
2020	China Karting Championship — Junior		1st
2020	Rotax Max Challenge China Festival — Junior		1st
2021	National Karting Club Championship — Junior		1st
2021	China Karting Championship — Senior		1st
2022	China Karting Championship — Senior		1st
2022	Rotax Max Challenge Grand Finals — Rotax Senior	Jay Wei International	60th
2022	Rotax Max Challenge China — Senior Max		1st

== Racing record ==
=== Racing career summary ===
Season	Series	Team	Races	Wins	Poles	F/Laps	Podiums	Points	Position
2023	Formula 4 South East Asia Championship	Asia Racing Team	8	0	0	0	1	46	7th
2023	Macau Formula 4 Race	Asia Racing Team	2	0	0	0	0	—N/a	8th
2024	Formula 4 UAE Championship	R-ace GP	15	0	0	0	1	37	14th
2024	Italian F4 Championship	R-ace GP	21	0	0	0	0	6	23rd
2024	Euro 4 Championship	R-ace GP	9	0	0	0	0	0	25th
2025	Formula Regional Oceania Championship	M2 Competition	15	0	0	0	0	149	11th
2025	Formula Regional European Championship	RPM	12	0	0	0	0	0	23rd
2025	Euroformula Open Championship	BVM Racing	6	0	0	1	0	20	16th
2025	Macau Grand Prix	PHM Racing	1	0	0	0	0	—N/a	15th
2026	Euroformula Open Championship	Team Motopark	24	10	2	5	18	421	**1st**

* Season still in progress.

=== Complete Formula 4 South East Asia Championship results ===
(key) (Races in bold indicate pole position) (Races in italics indicate fastest lap)

Year	Entrant	1	2	3	4	5	6	7	8	9	10	11	Pos	Points
2023	Asia Racing Team	ZZIC1; 1	ZZIC1; 2	ZZIC1; 3	MAC; 1; 10	MAC; 2; 8	SEP1; 1; 4	SEP1; 2; 2	SEP1; 3; 7	SEP2; 1; 6	SEP2; 2; 13	SEP2; 3; 9	7th	46

=== Complete Formula 4 UAE Championship results ===
(key) (Races in bold indicate pole position) (Races in italics indicate fastest lap)

Year	Team	1	2	3	4	5	6	7	8	9	10	11	12	13	14	15	DC	Points
2024	R-ace GP	YMC1; 1; 15	YMC1; 2 Ret	YMC1; 3; 10	YMC2; 1 Ret	YMC2; 2 Ret	YMC2; 3; 10	DUB1; 1; 23	DUB1; 2; 9	DUB1; 3 Ret	YMC3; 1; 12	YMC3; 2; 3	YMC3; 3; 11	DUB2; 1; 6	DUB2; 2; 32	DUB2; 3; 5	14th	37

=== Complete Italian F4 Championship results ===
(key) (Races in bold indicate pole position) (Races in italics indicate fastest lap)

Year	Team	1	2	3	4	5	6	7	8	9	10	11	12	13	14	15	16	17	18	19	20	21	DC	Points
2024	R-ace GP	MIS; 1; 7	MIS; 2; 15	MIS; 3; 22	IMO; 1 Ret	IMO; 2; 31	IMO; 3; 13	VLL; 1 Ret	VLL; 2; 22	VLL; 3; 20	MUG; 1; 31†	MUG; 2; 18	MUG; 3; 19	LEC; 1; 17	LEC; 2; 13	LEC; 3; 30	CAT; 1; 17	CAT; 2 Ret	CAT; 3; 20	MNZ; 1; 35†	MNZ; 2; 26	MNZ; 3; 30	23rd	6

=== Complete Euro 4 Championship results ===
(key) (Races in bold indicate pole position; races in italics indicate fastest lap)

Year	Team	1	2	3	4	5	6	7	8	9	DC	Points
2024	R-ace GP	MUG; 1; 14	MUG; 2; 16	MUG; 3; 12	RBR; 1; 24	RBR; 2; 26	RBR; 3; 19	MNZ; 1; 12	MNZ; 2; 15	MNZ; 3; 24	25th	0

=== Complete Formula Regional Oceania Championship results ===
(key) (Races in bold indicate pole position) (Races in italics indicate fastest lap)

Year	Team	1	2	3	4	5	6	7	8	9	10	11	12	13	14	15	DC	Points
2025	M2 Competition	TAU; 1; 7	TAU; 2; 4	TAU; 3; 16	HMP; 1; 13	HMP; 2; 13	HMP; 3; 11	MAN; 1; 14	MAN; 2; 4	MAN; 3; 6	TER; 1; 8	TER; 2; 4	TER; 3; 14	HIG; 1; 13	HIG; 2; 11	HIG; 3 Ret	11th	149

=== Complete Formula Regional European Championship results ===
(key) (Races in bold indicate pole position) (Races in italics indicate fastest lap)

Year	Team	1	2	3	4	5	6	7	8	9	10	11	12	13	14	15	16	17	18	19	20	DC	Points
2025	RPM	MIS; 1; 15	MIS; 2; 21	SPA; 1; 23	SPA; 2; 18	ZAN; 1; 18	ZAN; 2; 18	HUN; 1; 18	HUN; 2; 13	LEC; 1; 23	LEC; 2; 14	IMO; 1; 11	IMO; 2; 16	RBR; 1	RBR; 2	CAT; 1	CAT; 2	HOC; 1	HOC; 2	MNZ; 1	MNZ; 2	23rd	0

=== Complete Euroformula Open Championship results ===
(key) (Races in bold indicate pole position) (Races in italics indicate fastest lap)

Year	Entrant	1	2	3	4	5	6	7	8	9	10	11	12	13	14	15	16	17	18	19	20	21	22	23	24	DC	Points
2025	BVM Racing	PRT; 1	PRT; 2	PRT; 3	SPA; 1	SPA; 2	SPA; 3	HOC; 1	HOC; 2	HOC; 3	HUN; 1	HUN; 2	HUN; 3	LEC; 1	LEC; 2	LEC; 3	RBR; 1	RBR; 2	RBR; 3	CAT; 1; 7	CAT; 2; 11	CAT; 3 Ret	MNZ; 1 Ret	MNZ; 2; 4	MNZ; 3; 10	16th	20
2026	Team Motopark	**PRT**; **1**; 1	PRT; 2; 5	PRT; 3; 1	**SPA**; **1**; 1	SPA; 2; 1	SPA; 3; 1	MIS; 1; 2	MIS; 2; 3	MIS; 3 (6)	HUN; 1; 2	HUN; 2; 2	HUN; 3; 1	LEC; 1; 2	LEC; 2; 5	LEC; 3 (10)	HOC; 1; 1	HOC; 2; 3	HOC; 3; 3	MNZ; 1; 6	MNZ; 2; 2	MNZ; 3; 1	CAT; 1; 1	CAT; 2 (8)	CAT; 3; 1	1st	421

* Season still in progress.

=== Complete Macau Grand Prix results ===
Year	Team	Car	Qualifying	Quali Race	Main race
2025	(Germany) PHM Racing	Tatuus F3 T-318	13th	25th	15th
