= Liam Sceats =

New Zealand racing driver (born 2005)

- Nationality: (New Zealand) New Zealander
- Born: 20 September 2005 (age 21) Auckland, New Zealand

Indy NXT career
- Debut season: 2025
- Current team: HMD Motorsports
- Car number: 30
- Starts: 8 (8 entries)
- Wins: 0
- Podiums: 0
- Poles: 0
- Fastest laps: 0
- Best finish: 6th (Barber Motorsport Park) in 2025

Previous series
- 2024 2023 2021–22 2021–22 2021-22 2020-21, 2021-22: USF Pro 2000 Championship; Formula Regional Japanese Championship; Formula Ford Manfeild Winter Series; NZ Formula Ford Championships; Formula Ford New Zealand South Island Series; North Island Formula Ford Series

Championship titles
- 2024: Lady Wigram Trophy

Liam Sceats (born 20 September 2005) is a racing driver from New Zealand who competes in the Lamborghini Super Trofeo Asia for VSR. He previously competed in the 2024 USF Pro 2000 Championship for TJ Speed Motorsports.

== Early career ==
=== Formula Regional Oceania Championship ===
==== 2023 ====
After competing in karting and Formula Ford championships, on the 29 December 2022, it was announced that Sceats would make his debut in the 2023 Formula Regional Oceania Championship with M2 Competition. He would get his first podium of the series at Highlands Motorsport Park. Sceats would finish fourth in the standings with three podiums.

==== 2024 ====
In 2024, Sceats would return to the championship, once again driving for M2 Competition. He would qualify on pole for the third race at Euromarque Motorsport Park and go on to get his first win in the series.

At the final round at Highlands Motorsport Park, Sceats qualified on pole for race one, while championship leader Roman Bilinski crashed during qualifying. Sceats also qualified on pole for the New Zealand Grand Prix (race 3). He would have a commanding performance in race one and proceeded to win the race. Sceats managed to keep the championship alive with this result. During race two, championship rival Bilinski had climbed all the way up to second. Bilinski would fight with Bryce Aron for the top spot, but only briefly, as Bilinski's pace faded and was passed by Patrick Woods-Toth. However, this was enough for Bilinski to take the title. In the New Zealand Grand Prix, Sceats would battle with Callum Hedge for the win. Hedge kept putting pressure on Sceats, but Sceats would ultimately hold him off and win his home race. Sceats finished second in the championship to Bilinski.

==== 2026 ====
Sceats made a one-off cameo with HMD Motorsports with TJ Speed in the final round of the series at Highlands Motorsport Park, and scored a sole podium in the second race.

=== Formula Regional Japanese Championship ===
==== 2023 ====
Sceats would join the 2023 Formula Regional Japanese Championship driving for Sutekina Racing Team. He would get his first win in the third round of the championship at Okayama International Circuit, and became the first foreign race winner in championship history. Sceats would be in championship contention all season with Sota Ogawa. Sceats would get two more wins at Twin Ring Motegi and Fuji Speedway before the final round of the season at Sugo. In the second race at Fuji, championship leader Ogawa would go off during the race and ultimately have to retire. This promoted Sceats to first and allowed him to win the race. Ogawa's championship lead reduced to just 28 points going into the final round. At the final round at Sugo, Ogawa had done enough to take the title ahead of Sceats. Sceats finished second in the standings.

=== USF Pro 2000 Championship ===
==== 2024 ====
For 2024, Sceats would make the move to America and compete in the 2024 USF Pro 2000 Championship with TJ Speed Motorsports. In the second race at Indianapolis Motor Speedway, he would finish second to Nikita Johnson. However, Johnson was disqualified after the race which promoted Sceats to first. Sceats achieved his next podium at Road America, and got his final podium of the season at the Grand Prix of Toronto. He finished the championship in fifth position with 256 points.

=== Indy NXT ===
==== 2025 ====
On 13 February 2025, it was announced that Sceats would join HMD Motorsports to compete in the 2025 Indy NXT at St. Petersburg in the No. 30 car. Sceats finished 18th in the championship with five top-tenüs.

== Sportscar career ==
=== One-make Lamborghini racing ===
==== 2026 ====
Sceats transitioned to sportscar racing in the form of one-make Lamborghini's where he competed in the 2026 Lamborghini Super Trofeo Asia for VSR with Pole Gustaw Wisniewski. The duo took wins at Sepang, Inje, Shanghai, and Monza, which left them three points behind championship winner, William Tregurtha. He came fourth and second in the two races of the World Finals at Monza and participated in the Lamborghini Young Driver shootout.

== Karting record ==
=== Karting career summary ===
Season	Series	Team	Position
2013	Kartsport Auckland Club Point Series - Cadet Raket class		12th
2013	Kartsport NZ North Island Sprint Championship - Cadet class		24th
2014	46th Blossom Festival - Cadet class		8th
2014	Kartsport Auckland City of Sails - Cadet Raket class		4th
2014	Kartsport Auckland Club Point Series - Cadet Raket class		2nd
2014	Kartsport Auckland Club Point Series - Cadet Rok class		3rd
2014	Kartsport NZ North Island Sprint Championship - Cadet class		16th
2014	Kartsport NZ National Schools Championship - Cadet class		10th
2014	NZ Top Half Series - Cadet class		
2015	47th Blossom Festival - Cadet class		1st
2015	Kartsport NZ National Schools Championship - Cadet class		2nd
2015	Kartsport Auckland City of Sails - Cadet Rok class		3rd
2015	Kartsport Auckland Club Point Series - Cadet Rok class		2nd
2015	Kartsport Auckland Club Point Series - Cadet Raket class		3rd
2015	Kartsport NZ North Island Sprint Championship - Cadet class		2nd
2015	NZ National Sprint Championship - Cadet		7th
2016	48th Blossom Festival - Vortex Mini Rok class		6th
2016	Kartsport NZ National Schools Championship - Vortex Mini Rok		6th
2016	Kartsport Auckland City of Sails - Cadet Rok class		5th
2016	Kartsport Auckland Club Point Series - Vortex Mini Rok class		15th
2016	Giltrap Group Kartsport NZ Sprint Championship - Cadet class		10th
2017	Kartsport NZ National Schools Championship - Vortex Mini Rok		3rd
2017	Kartsport Auckland City of Sails - Vortex Mini Rok class		4th
2017	NZ Top Half Series - Vortex Mini Rok class		
2017	Sievwright Kartsport NZ National Sprint Championship - Vortex Mini ROK class		4th
2018	Kartsport Auckland - Auckland Regional Schools Championship - Rotax Max Junior class		7th
2018	50th Blossom Festival - Rotax Max Junior class		8th
2018	Kartsport NZ National Schools Championship presented by Napier Boys High School - Junior Rotax		7th
2018	Kartsport NZ North Island Sprint Championship - Rotax Junior class		7th
2018	Kartsport Auckland City of Sails - Rotax Junior class		6th
2018	RMC New Zealand - Junior Max		5th
2018	NZ National Sprint Championship - Junior Max		10th
2019	Kartsport NZ National Sprint Championship - Vortex Rok DVS Junior class		2nd
2019	Australian Kart Championship - KA2		18th
2019	CIK Trophy of New Zealand - Vortex Rok DVS Junior		2nd
2019	Kartsport NZ National Schools Championship - Junior Rotax		2nd
2019	Kartsport NZ North Island Sprint Championship - Rotax Junior class		1st
2019	ROK Cup Superfinal - Junior ROK	Ward Racing	
2019	NZ National Sprint Championship - Junior Max		21st
2020	Kartsport NZ National Sprint Championship - Vortex Rok DVS Junior class		
2020	Kartsport NZ North Island Sprint Championship - Rotax Light		17th
2020	Kartsport Auckland City of Sails - Rotax Junior class		6th
2020	Australian Kart Championship - KA2		31st
2021	McFall Fuels Kartsport NZ National Schools Championship presented by Cambridge High School - Rotax Light		11th
2021	Pool & Spa Maintenance Ltd Kartsport Auckland City of Sails - Rotax Light class		9th

== Racing record ==
=== Racing career summary ===
Season	Series	Team	Races	Wins	Poles	F/Laps	Podiums	Points	Position
2020-21	North Island Formula Ford Series		15	0	0	0	1	?	4th
2021	NZ Formula Ford Championship		6	0	0	0	0	285	8th
2021	Formula Ford Manfeild Winter Series		9	4	1	3	5	506	**3rd**
2021-22	North Island Formula Ford Series		12	6	2	6	8	701	**3rd**
2021-22	Formula Ford New Zealand South Island Series		2	0	0	0	0	?	?
2022	NZ Formula Ford Championship		8	4	1	4	5	460	**3rd**
2022	Formula Ford Manfeild Winter Series		3	3	1	0	3	225	8th
2023	Formula Regional Oceania Championship	M2 Competition	15	0	0	1	3	245	4th
2023	Formula Regional Japanese Championship	Sutekina Racing Team	16	3	0	2	8	219.5	**2nd**
2024	Formula Regional Oceania Championship	M2 Competition	15	3	2	3	8	341	**2nd**
2024	Tasman Series	M2 Competition	6	0	0	1	3	127	**2nd**
2024	USF Pro 2000 Championship	TJ Speed Motorsports	18	1	0	0	5	256	5th
2025	Indy NXT	HMD Motorsports	8	0	0	0	0	162	18th
2026	Formula Regional Oceania Trophy	HMD Motorsports with TJ Speed	3	0	0	0	1	52	20th
2026	Lamborghini Super Trofeo Asia - Pro	VSR	12	4	1	4	12	152	**2nd**

^{*} Season still in progress.

=== Complete Formula Regional Oceania Championship / Trophy results ===
(key) (Races in bold indicate pole position) (Races in italics indicate fastest lap)

Year	Team	1	2	3	4	5	6	7	8	9	10	11	12	13	14	15	DC	Points
2023	M2 Competition	HIG; 1; 5	HIG; 2 Ret	HIG; 3; 3	TER; 1; 6	TER; 2; 5	TER; 3; 3	MAN; 1 Ret	MAN; 2; 8	MAN; 3; 3	HMP; 1; 11	HMP; 2; 7	HMP; 3; 6	TAU; 1; 4	TAU; 2; 5	TAU; 3; 5	4th	245
2024	M2 Competition	TAU; 1; 5	TAU; 2; 4	TAU; 3; 3	MAN; 1; 3	MAN; 2; 6	MAN; 3; 3	HMP; 1; 2	HMP; 2; 6	HMP; 3; 5	RUA; 1; 2	RUA; 2; 8	RUA; 3; 1	**HIG**; **1**; 1	HIG; 2; 9	**HIG**; **3**; 1	2nd	341
2026	HMD Motorsports with TJ Speed	HMP; 1	HMP; 2	HMP; 3	HMP; 4	TAU; 1	TAU; 2	TAU; 3	TAU; 4	TER; 1	TER; 2	TER; 3	TER; 4	HIG; 1; 7	HIG; 2; 3	HIG; 3; 7	20th	52

=== Complete New Zealand Grand Prix results ===
Year	Team	Car	Qualifying	Main race
2023	(New Zealand) M2 Competition	Tatuus FT-60 - Toyota	6th	6th
2024	(New Zealand) M2 Competition	Tatuus FT-60 - Toyota	**1st**	**1st**
2026	(United States) HMD Motorsports with TJ Speed	Tatuus FT-60 - Toyota	6th	7th

=== Complete Formula Regional Japanese Championship results ===
(key) (Races in bold indicate pole position) (Races in italics indicate fastest lap)

Year	Entrant	1	2	3	4	5	6	7	8	9	10	11	12	13	14	15	16	Pos	Points
2023	Sutekina Racing Team	FUJ1; 1; 4	FUJ1; 2 Ret	FUJ1; 3; 5	SUZ; 1; 3	SUZ; 2; 2	OKA; 1; 4	OKA; 2; 4	OKA; 3; 1	MOT; 1; 3	MOT; 2; 4	MOT; 3; 1	FUJ2; 1; 4	FUJ2; 2; 1	SUG; 1; 2	SUG; 2; 3	SUG; 3; 5	2nd	219.5

=== American open-wheel racing results ===
==== USF Pro 2000 Championship ====
(key) (Races in bold indicate pole position) (Races in italics indicate fastest lap)

Year	Team	1	2	3	4	5	6	7	8	9	10	11	12	13	14	15	16	17	18	Pos	Points
2024	TJ Speed Motorsports	STP; 1; 3	STP; 2; 6	LOU; 1; 18	LOU; 2; 8	LOU; 3; 11	IMS; 1; 2	IMS; 2; 1*	IMS; 3; 5	IRP; 9	ROA; 1; 8	ROA; 2; 3	ROA; 3; 8	MOH; 1; 14	MOH; 2; 19	TOR; 1; 16	TOR; 2; 2	POR; 1; 15	POR; 2; 12	5th	256

==== Indy NXT ====
(key) (Races in bold indicate pole position) (Races in italics indicate fastest lap) (Races with ^{L} indicate a race lap led) (Races with * indicate most race laps led)

Year	Team	1	2	3	4	5	6	7	8	9	10	11	12	13	14	Rank	Points
2025	HMD Motorsports	STP; 18	BAR; 6	IMS; 7	IMS; 8	DET; 14	GMP	RDA; 10	MOH	IOW	LAG; 8	LAG; 18	POR	MIL	NSH	18th	162

* Season still in progress.
