= 2025 New Zealand Grand Prix =

- Race 3, Round 5 of 5 of the 2025 Formula Regional Oceania Championship
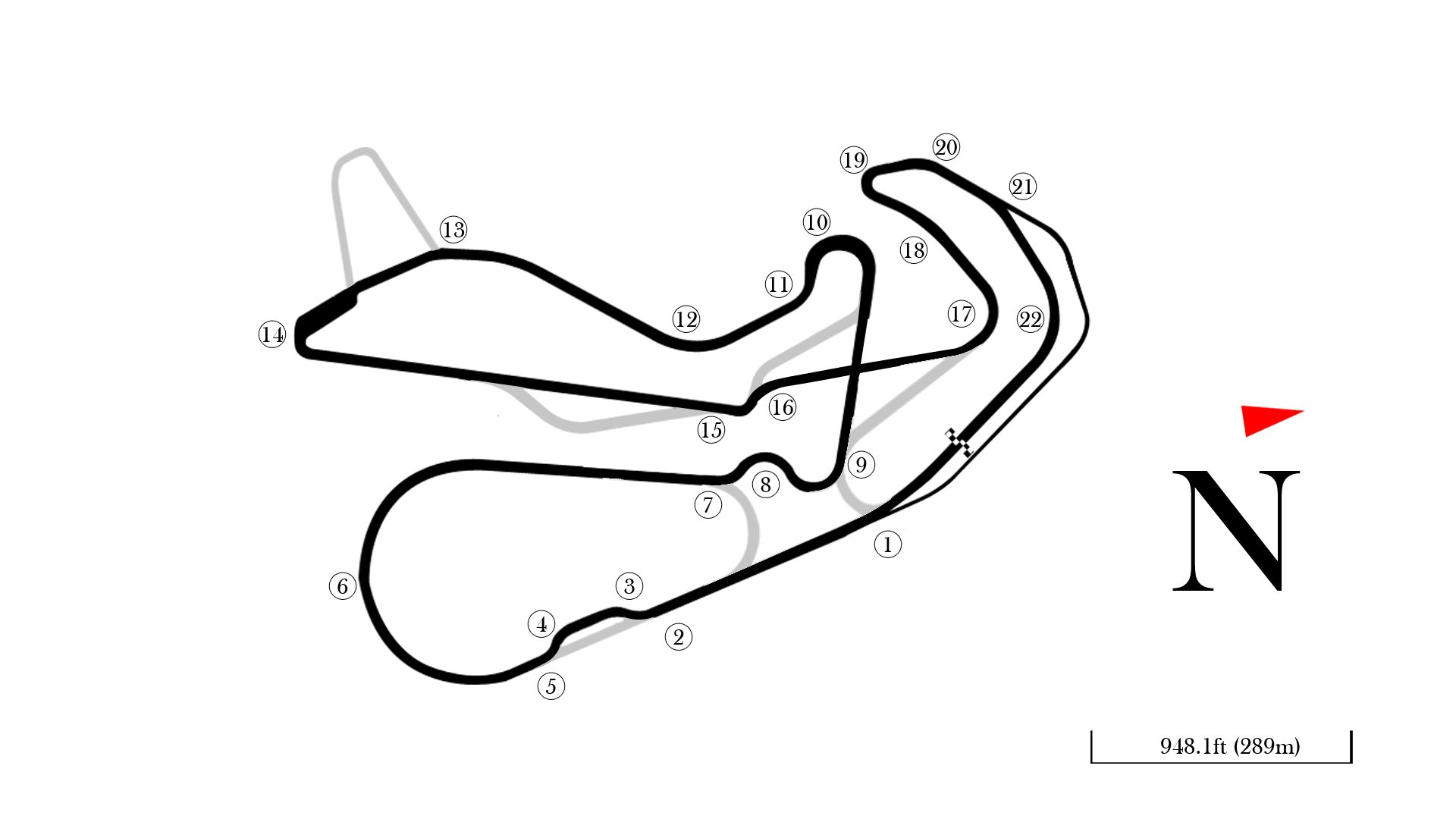

Race details
- Date: 9 February 2025
- Official name: LXIX New Zealand Grand Prix
- Location: Highlands Motorsport Park, Cromwell, New Zealand
- Course: Permanent racing facility
- Course length: 4.100 km (2.548 miles)
- Distance: 28 laps, 114.8 km (71.3 miles)
- Weather: Sunny

Pole position
Driver	(Australia) Broc Feeney	mtec Motorsport
- Time: 1:29.032

Fastest lap
Driver	(Peru) Matías Zagazeta	M2 Competition
- Time: 1:29.385 on lap 19

Podium
First	(Australia) Will Brown	Giles Motorsport
Second	(New Zealand) Zack Scoular	mtec Motorsport
Third	(United Kingdom) Arvid Lindblad	M2 Competition

The 2025 New Zealand Grand Prix was an event for open wheel racing cars held at Highlands Motorsport Park in Cromwell, Otago on 9 February 2025. It was the sixty-ninth New Zealand Grand Prix and utilised Formula Regional cars. The event served as the final race of the 2025 Formula Regional Oceania Championship.

The race was won by reigning Supercars champion, Will Brown. This marked the first time an Australian had won the marquee event since Warwick Brown in 1975. The podium was rounded out by Zack Scoular and Arvid Lindblad.

Earlier in the weekend, Lindblad had also secured the Formula Regional Oceania Championship and became the first Briton to win the title since Lando Norris.

== Background ==
The event was held at Highlands Motorsport Park in Cromwell for the second time in the circuit's history, across the weekend of 7–9 February. The Grand Prix was the final race of the final round of the 2025 Formula Regional Oceania Championship and the 69th running of the New Zealand Grand Prix.

Heading into the weekend, Arvid Lindblad was on the verge of securing the championship. The Brit held a 59-point lead over second-placed driver, Nikita Johnson. After finishing on the podium in the first race, his points lead had become insurmountable and he was declared the winner of the championship. As a result, Lindblad's car number was changed from 4 to 1 for the final race to commemorate his title victory.

Both Triple Eight Race Engineering Supercars drivers, Will Brown and Broc Feeney, were announced to drive in the marquee event. Having already competed in the first two rounds this season, this marked Brown's first championship open-wheeler drive since 2016 and the first ever for Feeney.

== Qualifying ==
Qualifying was held on 8 February 2025, at 11:50 local time (UTC+12:00)

=== Qualifying classification ===
Pos.	No.	Driver	Team	Qualifying times			Final grid
Pos.	No.	Driver	Team	Q1	Q2	Q3	Final grid
1	93	(Australia) Broc Feeney	mtec Motorsport	1:29.660	1:29.688	1:29.032	1
2	87	(Australia) Will Brown	Giles Motorsport	1:29.421	1:29.452	1:29.186	2
3	5	(Australia) Patrick Heuzenroeder	mtec Motorsport	1:29.320	1:29.495	1:29.216	6^{1}
4	3	(New Zealand) Zack Scoular	M2 Competition	1:29.600	1:29.672	1:29.222	3
5	1	(United Kingdom) Arvid Lindblad	M2 Competition	1:29.418	1:29.597	1:29.226	4
6	32	(United States) Shawn Rashid	mtec Motorsport	1:29.733	1:29.620	1:29.503	5
7	17	(United States) Nikita Johnson	M2 Competition	1:29.856	1:29.803	1:29.706	7
8	22	(United States) Jett Bowling	Kiwi Motorsport	1:30.153	1:29.891	1:30.146	8
9	9	(Brazil) Nicholas Monteiro	mtec Motorsport	1:30.015	1:29.976	N/A	9
10	23	(South Korea) Michael Shin	M2 Competition	1:29.507	1:30.035	N/A	10
11	15	(Australia) Nicolas Stati	Kiwi Motorsport	1:30.179	1:30.209	N/A	11
12	8	(Peru) Matías Zagazeta	M2 Competition	1:29.656	1:30.312	N/A	12
13	69	(New Zealand) Sebastian Manson	M2 Competition	1:30.170	1:30.476	N/A	13
14	77	(Chinese Taipei) Enzo Yeh	M2 Competition	1:30.254	N/A	N/A	14
15	41	(New Zealand) Alex Crosbie	Giles Motorsport	1:30.304	N/A	N/A	15
16	88	(Canada) James Lawley	Kiwi Motorsport	1:30.594	N/A	N/A	16
17	13	(United States) Barrett Wolfe	Giles Motorsport	1:31.070	N/A	N/A	17
107% time: 1:35.264

Notes

- ^1 – Patrick Heuzenroeder qualified 3rd, but was required to start the race from sixth for causing a collision in the previous race.

== Race ==
The race was held on 9 February 2025, at 16:44 local time (UTC+12:00), and was run for 27 laps.

=== Race classification ===
Pos.	No.	Driver	Teams	Laps	Time/Retired	Grid
1	87	(Australia) Will Brown	Giles Motorsport	27	43min 55.455sec	2
2	3	(New Zealand) Zack Scoular	mtec Motorsport	27	+ 0.963	3
3	1	(United Kingdom) Arvid Lindblad	M2 Competition	27	+ 1.860	4
4	32	(United States) Shawn Rashid	mtec Motorsport	27	+ 11.372	5
5	23	(South Korea) Michael Shin	M2 Competition	27	+ 11.726	10
6	93	(Australia) Broc Feeney	mtec Motorsport	27	+ 13.015	1
7	22	(United States) Jett Bowling	Kiwi Motorsport	27	+ 14.452	8
8	17	(United States) Nikita Johnson	M2 Competition	27	+ 15.418	7
9	69	(New Zealand) Sebastian Manson	M2 Competition	27	+ 16.835	13
10	41	(New Zealand) Alex Crosbie	Giles Motorsport	27	+ 17.296	15
11	15	(Australia) Nicolas Stati	Kiwi Motorsport	27	+ 29.426	11
12	9	(Brazil) Nicholas Monteiro	mtec Motorsport	27	+ 30.214	9
13	13	(United States) Barrett Wolfe	Giles Motorsport	27	+ 34.186	17
Ret	8	(Peru) Matías Zagazeta	M2 Competition	20	Retired	12
Ret	88	(Canada) James Lawley	Kiwi Motorsport	11	Accident damage	16
Ret	5	(Australia) Patrick Heuzenroeder	mtec Motorsport	8	Suspension	6
Ret	77	(Chinese Taipei) Enzo Yeh	M2 Competition	1	Accident	14
Fastest lap: (Peru) Matías Zagazeta (M2 Competition) – 1:29.385 (lap 19)

Preceded by 2024 New Zealand Grand Prix	New Zealand Grand Prix; 2025	Succeeded by 2026 New Zealand Grand Prix
