= 2025 Formula Regional Oceania Championship =

Motor racing competition

The 2025 Castrol Toyota Formula Regional Oceania Championship was the third season of the Formula Regional Oceania Championship, and the twentieth running of the premier open-wheel motorsport category formerly known as the Toyota Racing Series. It was held in New Zealand over five consecutive weekends in January and February 2025.

The highest placed Australian or Kiwi driver after the first two rounds was awarded the Tasman Cup. Zack Scoular, driving for mtec Motorsport, was second overall after the second round, thereby claiming that title.

Scoular then also went on to win the Rookie Championship at the penultimate round of the season, before Arvid Lindblad, driving for M2 Competition, took the Drivers' Championship with two races to spare and his team took the Teams' Championship at the same race.

== Entry list ==
All drivers competed with identical Tatuus FT-60 chassis cars powered by 2.0L turbocharged Toyota engines running on 100% fossil-free fuel.

Team	No.	Driver	Status	Rounds
mtec Motorsport	3	(New Zealand) Zack Scoular	R	All
mtec Motorsport	5	(Australia) Patrick Heuzenroeder		All
mtec Motorsport	9	(Brazil) Nicholas Monteiro		All
mtec Motorsport	14	(United States) Josh Pierson		1–4
mtec Motorsport	32	(United States) Shawn Rashid		All
mtec Motorsport	93	(Australia) Broc Feeney		5
M2 Competition	4	(United Kingdom) Arvid Lindblad		All
M2 Competition	8	(Peru) Matías Zagazeta		All
M2 Competition	17	(United States) Nikita Johnson		All
M2 Competition	23	(South Korea) Michael Shin		All
M2 Competition	69	(New Zealand) Sebastian Manson		All
M2 Competition	77	(Chinese Taipei) Enzo Yeh	R	All
Giles Motorsport	13	(United States) Barrett Wolfe	R	All
Giles Motorsport	16	(Australia) Tommy Smith		3–4
Giles Motorsport	41	(New Zealand) Alex Crosbie		All
Giles Motorsport	87	(Australia) Will Brown		1–2, 5
Kiwi Motorsport	15	(Australia) Nicolas Stati	R	All
Kiwi Motorsport	22	(United States) Jett Bowling		All
Kiwi Motorsport	88	(Canada) James Lawley		All

Icon	Status
R	Rookie
G	Guest driver

== Race calendar ==
The 2025 race calendar was announced in July 2024. The championship again consisted of five weekends. Highlands Motorsport Park was intended to leave the calendar and be replaced by Teretonga Park, which returned after a one-year absence. However, on 2 September 2024, it was announced that the 69th running of the New Zealand Grand Prix would be held at Highlands Motorsport Park instead of at Euromarque Motorsport Park, so the latter left the calendar instead.

Round		Circuit	Date	Feature race	Support bill	Map of circuit locations
1	R1	Taupo International Motorsport Park (Taupō, Waikato)	11 January	Denny Hulme Memorial Trophy	Taupo Historic Grand Prix; Formula Atlantic NZ Historic; Historic Saloons, Sports and GTs; F5000 Tasman Cup Revival	2025 Formula Regional Oceania Championship is located in New Zealand
1	R2	Taupo International Motorsport Park (Taupō, Waikato)	12 January	Denny Hulme Memorial Trophy	Taupo Historic Grand Prix; Formula Atlantic NZ Historic; Historic Saloons, Sports and GTs; F5000 Tasman Cup Revival	2025 Formula Regional Oceania Championship is located in New Zealand
1	R3	Taupo International Motorsport Park (Taupō, Waikato)	12 January	Denny Hulme Memorial Trophy	Taupo Historic Grand Prix; Formula Atlantic NZ Historic; Historic Saloons, Sports and GTs; F5000 Tasman Cup Revival	2025 Formula Regional Oceania Championship is located in New Zealand
2	R1	Hampton Downs Motorsport Park (Hampton Downs, North Waikato)	18 January	Dorothy Smith Memorial Trophy	Toyota GR86 Championship; Super V8 Series; GT New Zealand Championship; TA2 New Zealand	2025 Formula Regional Oceania Championship is located in New Zealand
2	R2	Hampton Downs Motorsport Park (Hampton Downs, North Waikato)	19 January	Dorothy Smith Memorial Trophy	Toyota GR86 Championship; Super V8 Series; GT New Zealand Championship; TA2 New Zealand	2025 Formula Regional Oceania Championship is located in New Zealand
2	R3	Hampton Downs Motorsport Park (Hampton Downs, North Waikato)	19 January	Dorothy Smith Memorial Trophy	Toyota GR86 Championship; Super V8 Series; GT New Zealand Championship; TA2 New Zealand	2025 Formula Regional Oceania Championship is located in New Zealand
3	R1	Manfeild: Circuit Chris Amon (Feilding, Manawatū District)	25 January	Dan Higgins Trophy	NextGen NZ Championship Manfeild International; GT Racing New Zealand	2025 Formula Regional Oceania Championship is located in New Zealand
3	R2	Manfeild: Circuit Chris Amon (Feilding, Manawatū District)	26 January	Dan Higgins Trophy	NextGen NZ Championship Manfeild International; GT Racing New Zealand	2025 Formula Regional Oceania Championship is located in New Zealand
3	R3	Manfeild: Circuit Chris Amon (Feilding, Manawatū District)	26 January	Dan Higgins Trophy	NextGen NZ Championship Manfeild International; GT Racing New Zealand	2025 Formula Regional Oceania Championship is located in New Zealand
4	R1	Teretonga Park (Invercargill, Southland District)	1 February	Spirit of a Nation Cup	Toyota GR86 Championship; GT New Zealand Championship; Mazda Racing Series NZ Championship; Pirelli Porsche Race Series	2025 Formula Regional Oceania Championship is located in New Zealand
4	R2	Teretonga Park (Invercargill, Southland District)	2 February	Spirit of a Nation Cup	Toyota GR86 Championship; GT New Zealand Championship; Mazda Racing Series NZ Championship; Pirelli Porsche Race Series	2025 Formula Regional Oceania Championship is located in New Zealand
4	R3	Teretonga Park (Invercargill, Southland District)	2 February	Spirit of a Nation Cup	Toyota GR86 Championship; GT New Zealand Championship; Mazda Racing Series NZ Championship; Pirelli Porsche Race Series	2025 Formula Regional Oceania Championship is located in New Zealand
5	R1	Highlands Motorsport Park (Cromwell, Otago)	8 February	New Zealand Grand Prix	Toyota GR86 Championship; GT New Zealand Championship; Mazda Racing Series NZ Championship; Pirelli Porsche Race Series	2025 Formula Regional Oceania Championship is located in New Zealand
5	R2	Highlands Motorsport Park (Cromwell, Otago)	9 February	New Zealand Grand Prix	Toyota GR86 Championship; GT New Zealand Championship; Mazda Racing Series NZ Championship; Pirelli Porsche Race Series	2025 Formula Regional Oceania Championship is located in New Zealand
5	R3	Highlands Motorsport Park (Cromwell, Otago)	9 February	New Zealand Grand Prix	Toyota GR86 Championship; GT New Zealand Championship; Mazda Racing Series NZ Championship; Pirelli Porsche Race Series	2025 Formula Regional Oceania Championship is located in New Zealand

== Race results ==
Round		Circuit	Pole position	Fastest lap	Winning driver	Winning team
1	R1	Taupo International Motorsport Park	(New Zealand) Zack Scoular	(New Zealand) Zack Scoular	(New Zealand) Zack Scoular	mtec Motorsport
1	R2	Taupo International Motorsport Park		(South Korea) Michael Shin	(Peru) Matías Zagazeta	M2 Competition
1	R3	Taupo International Motorsport Park	(United Kingdom) Arvid Lindblad	(Australia) Will Brown	(United Kingdom) Arvid Lindblad	M2 Competition
2	R1	Hampton Downs Motorsport Park	(United Kingdom) Arvid Lindblad	(United States) Josh Pierson	(United Kingdom) Arvid Lindblad	M2 Competition
2	R2	Hampton Downs Motorsport Park		(United Kingdom) Arvid Lindblad	(New Zealand) Sebastian Manson	M2 Competition
2	R3	Hampton Downs Motorsport Park	(United Kingdom) Arvid Lindblad	(United Kingdom) Arvid Lindblad	(United Kingdom) Arvid Lindblad	M2 Competition
3	R1	Manfeild: Circuit Chris Amon	(United Kingdom) Arvid Lindblad	(United Kingdom) Arvid Lindblad	(United Kingdom) Arvid Lindblad	M2 Competition
3	R2	Manfeild: Circuit Chris Amon		(New Zealand) Zack Scoular	(New Zealand) Zack Scoular	mtec Motorsport
3	R3	Manfeild: Circuit Chris Amon	(United Kingdom) Arvid Lindblad	(United Kingdom) Arvid Lindblad	(United Kingdom) Arvid Lindblad	M2 Competition
4	R1	Teretonga Park	(United Kingdom) Arvid Lindblad	(United Kingdom) Arvid Lindblad	(Peru) Matías Zagazeta	M2 Competition
4	R2	Teretonga Park		(United States) Josh Pierson	(New Zealand) Sebastian Manson	M2 Competition
4	R3	Teretonga Park	(Peru) Matías Zagazeta	(United Kingdom) Arvid Lindblad	(United Kingdom) Arvid Lindblad	M2 Competition
5	R1	Highlands Motorsport Park	(Australia) Patrick Heuzenroeder	(Australia) Patrick Heuzenroeder	(Australia) Patrick Heuzenroeder	mtec Motorsport
5	R2	Highlands Motorsport Park		(United States) Nikita Johnson	(United States) Nikita Johnson	M2 Competition
5	R3	Highlands Motorsport Park	(Australia) Broc Feeney	(Peru) Matías Zagazeta	(Australia) Will Brown	Giles Motorsport

== Season report ==
=== First half ===
The first round of the season was held at Taupo International Motorsport Park. Mtec Motorsport’s Zack Scoular secured his first pole position on his Formula Regional debut, and converted it into his first single-seater race win later on in the day. Giles Motorsport’s Will Brown remained in second for the duration of the race but was unable to overtake the leader, while M2 Competition’s Arvid Lindblad, who started fourth, took third at the start and also finished there. Race two began chaotically as a slow start by Mtec Motorsport’s pole-sitter Josh Pierson disrupted others and allowed M2 Competition’s Matías Zagazeta to take the race lead. His teammate Enzo Yeh initially secured second before a penalty dropped him to fourth behind Pierson and Lindblad. The latter started the third race from pole position, but Zagazeta made a better start, and the pair dueled through the opening corners before Lindblad regained the lead. He led Zagazeta and Scoular to the finish, ending the first round with a five-point championship lead.

Round two at Hampton Downs Motorsport Park began with Lindblad taking pole position for the opening race. He converted that into a lights-to-flag victory that mirrored the season opener, with Scoular maintaining second place from start to finish and Brown holding third after taking it from Pierson at the start. The second race saw Johnson start from pole position, but M2’s Sebastian Manson made a stronger start from second place and immediately took the lead, while mtec’s Patrick Heuzenroeder moved into third place. Behind the top two, Lindblad progressed through the field, engaging in a three-lap battle with Heuzenroeder before passing him to secure third place. In the third race, Lindblad and Scoular resumed their earlier contest. Once again starting from pole position, Lindblad withstood multiple attacks before creating a gap thanks to a tire advantage to secure another victory, with Pierson finishing third. After six races, Lindblad held a 25-point lead in the standings ahead of newly crowned Tasman Cup winner Scoular.

Lindblad remained the fastest driver in qualifying at Circuit Chris Amon to claim his fourth successive pole position. Race one saw him then take an unchallenged victory as Johnson in second had to keep Giles Motorsport’s series returnee Tommy Smith behind him at the start. Once repelled, Smith dropped back, allowing Heuzenroeder into third. Rain then began to fall, and the second race saw some drivers opt for wet-weather tires. That proved to be the right decision: Scoular claimed the lead and led Johnson and Pierson as the drivers on dry tires faded. Championship leader Lindblad was among them and finished the race 14th. Once he had tires fit for the conditions, Lindblad returned to his previous form and took pole position for the third race. Heavy rain saw proceedings get aborted initially, but when it resumed, Lindblad and Johnson quickly gapped Heuzenroeder and the rest of the field. Safety car phases further interrupted the race, but Lindblad held on to win and extend his championship lead to 40 points over Johnson.

=== Second half ===
Teretonga Park hosted round four, and the first qualifying session brought no new face at the front as Lindblad was fastest once again. Zagazeta had the better start to the first race, however, and quickly moved past Lindblad. With overtaking proving difficult, Zagazeta led Lindblad and Johnson home before a red flag after a crash for M2’s Michael Shin ended the race prematurely. Yeh started race two from pole position, but had a bad getaway and dropped to fourth behind Manson, Scoular and Heuzenroeder, before a crash caused a stoppage. The positions at the front remained static afterwards, awarding Manson his second win of the year. Qualifying for race three saw Zagazeta break Lindblad’s streak of pole positions, but once again the pole sitter was unable to hold the lead as Lindblad took first and converted that into his fourth feature race win. Zagazeta looked set for second before a mistake demoted him to third behind Shin. Ahead of the final weekend and with 90 points still on offer, Lindblad’s lead stood at 59 points over Johnson.

The final weekend of the championship, which included the New Zealand Grand Prix, took place at Highlands Motorsport Park. In the opening race, Heuzenroeder secured a lights-to-flag victory, while Lindblad finished second and won the title with two races to spare. Shin defended against Brown throughout the race to secure third place. The second race began with a major crash that eliminated Heuzenroeder, Lindblad and Shin. Following the restart, Johnson led the mtec duo of Nicholas Monteiro and Shawn Rashid to the finish, with most of the action occurring further down the field. Mtec’s one-off entrant, Broc Feeney, surprised the paddock by claiming pole position for the Grand Prix on his single-seater debut. However, his race start was less effective, as Brown and Scoular immediately overtook him. The leading duo pulled away while Lindblad pressured Feeney, engaging in a multi-lap battle before finally passing him. By then, Brown had established a sufficient gap to secure Grand Prix victory, with Scoular following him home.

From the announcement of his FROC campaign, Lindblad was regarded as a title favorite. Despite high expectations, he handled the pressure effectively, securing six pole positions, six victories, and six additional podium finishes to claim the championship by a 56-point margin - the largest since the COVID-affected 2021 season. Lindblad was also on course to make history as the first driver to win every feature race in a single season, but Brown denied him that achievement by winning the New Zealand Grand Prix, marking his first single-seater victory since 2016. While Lindblad frequently dominated the field, other drivers also had standout performances. Scoular exceeded expectations by winning on his Formula Regional debut, while Johnson delivered a strong and consistent campaign, only losing the runner-up position in the final race.

== Championship standings ==
=== Scoring system ===
No points were awarded for pole position or fastest lap.

Race (starting grid from qualifying)

Position	1st	2nd	3rd	4th	5th	6th	7th	8th	9th	10th	11th	12th	13th	14th	15th	16th	17th	18th	19th	20th
Points	35	31	27	24	22	20	18	16	14	12	10	9	8	7	6	5	4	3	2	1

Reversed grid race

Position	1st	2nd	3rd	4th	5th	6th	7th	8th	9th	10th	11th	12th	13th	14th	15th
Points	20	18	16	14	12	10	9	8	7	6	5	4	3	2	1

=== Drivers' championship ===
Pos.	Driver	TAU			HMP			MAN			TER			HIG			Points
Pos.	Driver	R1	R2	R3	R1	R2	R3	R1	R2	R3	R1	R2	R3	R1	R2	R3	Points
1	(United Kingdom) Arvid Lindblad	3	3	**1**	**1**	3	**1**	**1**	14	**1**	**2**	6	1	2	Ret	3	370
2	(New Zealand) Zack Scoular	**1**	10	3	2	7	2	8	1	8	5	2	8	5	4	2	314
3	(United States) Nikita Johnson	4	5	5	8	2	4	2	2	2	3	8	5	8	1	8	305
4	(Australia) Patrick Heuzenroeder	9	8	4	5	4	6	3	7	3	4	3	4	**1**	Ret	Ret	264
5	(Peru) Matías Zagazeta	5	1	2	16	11	5	12	13	5	1	7	**3**	4	6	Ret	244
6	(New Zealand) Sebastian Manson	10	7	9	7	1	10	6	Ret	4	7	1	7	9	5	9	225
7	(United States) Josh Pierson	8	2	6	4	6	3	5	3	9	6	5	6				219
8	(South Korea) Michael Shin	6	6	7	9	9	7	11	15	10	Ret	9	2	3	Ret	5	197
9	(United States) Shawn Rashid	15	13	10	6	8	9	13	8	11	14	13	11	6	3	4	169
10	(Australia) Will Brown	2	9	8	3	5	8							11	12	1	158
11	(Chinese Taipei) Enzo Yeh	7	4	16	13	13	11	14	4	6	8	4	14	13	11	Ret	149
12	(Brazil) Nicholas Monteiro	12	11	13	DSQ	14	14	9	5	13	11	12	13	7	2	12	132
13	(New Zealand) Alex Crosbie	11	15	11	10	DSQ	12	7	16	15	10	10	10	16	10	10	119
14	(Australia) Nicolas Stati	13	Ret	14	12	12	13	10	10	14	12	Ret	12	14	7	11	105
15	(United States) Jett Bowling	14	12	12	11	10	15	15	9	12	13	Ret	Ret	12	14	7	101
16	(Australia) Tommy Smith							4	6	7	9	11	9				85
17	(United States) Barrett Wolfe	16	14	15	14	15	17	17	12	16	15	14	16	17	9	13	70
18	(Canada) James Lawley	17	16	17	15	DSQ	16	16	11	Ret	16	Ret	15	15	8	Ret	54
19	(Australia) Broc Feeney													10	13	**6**	35
Pos.	Driver	R1	R2	R3	R1	R2	R3	R1	R2	R3	R1	R2	R3	R1	R2	R3	Points
Pos.	Driver	TAU			HMP			MAN			TER			HIG			Points

Colour	Result
Gold	Winner
Silver	Second place
Bronze	Third place
Green	Points classification
Blue	Non-points classification
Blue	Non-classified finish (NC)
Purple	Retired, not classified (Ret)
Red	Did not qualify (DNQ)
Red	Did not pre-qualify (DNPQ)
Black	Disqualified (DSQ)
White	Did not start (DNS)
White	Withdrew (WD)
White	Race cancelled (C)
Blank	Did not practice (DNP)
Blank	Did not arrive (DNA)
Blank	Excluded (EX)

**Bold** – Pole

Italics – Fastest Lap

† — Did not finish, but classified

Rookie

=== Teams' Championship ===
Each team counted its two best results of every race.

Pos.	Team	TAU			HMP			MAN			TER			HIG			Points
Pos.	Team	R1	R2	R3	R1	R2	R3	R1	R2	R3	R1	R2	R3	R1	R2	R3	Points
1	M2 Competition	3	1	**1**	**1**	1	**1**	**1**	2	**1**	1	1	1	2	1	3	772
1	M2 Competition	4	3	2	7	2	4	2	4	2	**2**	4	2	3	5	5	772
2	mtec motorsport	**1**	2	3	2	4	2	3	1	3	4	2	4	**1**	2	2	663
2	mtec motorsport	8	8	4	4	6	3	5	3	8	5	3	6	4	3	4	663
3	Giles Motorsport	2	9	8	3	5	8	4	6	7	9	10	9	11	9	1	371
3	Giles Motorsport	11	14	11	10	15	12	7	12	15	10	11	10	16	10	10	371
4	Kiwi Motorsport	13	12	12	11	10	13	10	9	12	12	Ret	12	12	7	7	218
4	Kiwi Motorsport	14	16	14	12	12	15	15	10	14	13	Ret	15	14	8	11	218
Pos.	Team	R1	R2	R3	R1	R2	R3	R1	R2	R3	R1	R2	R3	R1	R2	R3	Points
Pos.	Team	TAU			HMP			MAN			RUA			HIG			Points

=== Tasman Cup ===
Pos.	Driver	TAU			HMP			Points
Pos.	Driver	R1	R2	R3	R1	R2	R3	Points
1	(New Zealand) Zack Scoular	**1**	10	3	2	7	2	139
2	(Australia) Will Brown	2	9	8	3	5	8	109
3	(Australia) Patrick Heuzenroeder	9	8	4	5	4	6	102
4	(New Zealand) Sebastian Manson	10	7	9	7	1	10	83
5	(New Zealand) Alex Crosbie	11	15	11	10	DSQ	12	42
6	(Australia) Nicolas Stati	13	Ret	14	12	12	13	36
