= Zack Scoular =

New Zealand and Australian racing driver (born 2007)

- Scoular at Silverstone Circuit in 2026.
- Nationality: (New Zealand) New Zealander
- Born: 23 November 2007 (age 18) New Zealand

Le Mans Cup career
- Debut season: 2026
- Current team: R-ace GP
- Categorisation: FIA Silver
- Car number: 86
- Starts: 2
- Wins: 0
- Podiums: 1
- Poles: 0
- Fastest laps: 0

Previous series
- 2025–2026; 2025; 2024; 2024: FR Oceania; Eurocup-3; F4 British; F4 UAE

Championship titles
- 2026: New Zealand Grand Prix
- Statistics up to date as of 07 May 2026.

Zack Scoular (/ˈskuːlər/; born 23 November 2007) is a New Zealand and Australian racing driver who competes in the Le Mans Cup in LMP3 for R-ace GP. He previously competed in Eurocup-3 for Palou Motorsport in 2025.

Scoular previously competed in the 2025 Formula Regional Oceania Championship with mtec Motorsport, where he finished runner-up to Arvid Lindblad. He won the New Zealand Grand Prix in 2026.

== Early life ==
Scoular was born on 23 November 2007 in New Zealand. His father, Stuart Scoular, is a former rally driver who had his right leg amputated below the knee following a crash in the 2012 Targa Rally. Stuart credited Tony Quinn with saving his life, who later funded Scoular's 2025 campaign in Formula Regional Oceania. Scoular holds dual New Zealand and Australian nationality and is based in the United Arab Emirates.

== Racing career ==
=== Karting (2017–2023) ===
Scoular competed in karting both in the UAE, and in Europe. A result of note in his karting career was finishing in 3rd place in the 2023 IAME Series UAE, in the X30 Senior category.

=== Formula 4 (2023–2024) ===
==== 2023: Junior formulae debut ====
Scoular made his F4 debut at the F4 UAE Trophy Round, which was on the support bill for the Formula One World Championship race held at Yas Marina Circuit. He finished twelfth in both races.

==== 2024: Rookie season ====
Scoular was announced to be competing in the full 2024 Formula 4 UAE season, driving for the Yas Heat Racing Academy team. Scoular had a strong rookie season racing alongside more experienced drivers from all around the world, and he managed to score a best result of fifth, finishing 17th in the drivers' standings. He then continued to the 2024 F4 British Championship with Emirati team Xcel Motorsport. He had a tough opening weekend, failing to score any points, however he recovered the following weekend with a podium in the reverse-grid race at Brands Hatch, after Leo Robinson's disqualification. He then failed to score points until the fourth round at Thruxton, where he finished sixth in the third race of the round. He secured five more points finishes over the course of the season, including a fifth-placed finish at Silverstone. He finished 15th in the standings, scoring 52 points over the championship's thirty races.

=== Formula Regional (2025–2026) ===
==== 2025: Runner-up in Oceania ====
In late 2024, it was announced that Scoular would be making his Formula Regional debut, contesting the 2025 Formula Regional Oceania Championship with Kiwi outfit mtec Motorsport. Scoular received financial support for the season by winning the 2024 Tony Quinn Foundation Shootout, which took place at Hampton Downs. He finished seventh in the opening practice at Taupo. Scoular then took a debut pole position for the opening race, ahead of Supercars Championship driver Will Brown. He then converted it to a lights-to-flag victory in the first race. He capped off the weekend with a third-placed finish in the third race of the weekend, as he stood third in the championship standings after the round. During the second round at Hampton Downs, Scoular secured a podium during races one and three. He won the reverse-grid race two at Manfeild after starting from pole. During the next round at Teretonga Park, Scoular claimed a podium during race two, and managed to clinch the rookie championship for the season.

Scoular then competed in the Eurocup-3 for Palou Motorsport. He also competed in the final two rounds of the Eurocup-3 Spanish Winter Championship with the same team. At Monza, Scoular did not finish during race one, and finished 22nd during race 2. He has achieved a best result of 16th in the second race at Portimão.

==== 2026: Victory in the New Zealand Grand Prix ====
Scoular returned to Formula Regional Oceania in 2026 with mtec Motorsport.

== Karting record ==
=== Karting career summary ===
Season	Series	Team	Position
2017–18	IAME Series UAE — X30 Cadet		12th
2018–19	IAME Series UAE — X30 Junior		14th
2019–20	IAME Series UAE — X30 Junior		3rd
2020	RMC International Trophy — Junior Max	KR Sport	40th
2020–21	IAME Series UAE — X30 Junior		5th
2021	IAME Euro Series — X30 Junior	KR Sport	30th
2021	IAME Warriors Final — X30 Junior	KR Sport	NC
2021	RMC Grand Finals — Junior Max	Al Ain Raceway	52nd
2021–22	IAME Series UAE — X30 Senior		6th
2022	Rotax Max Euro Trophy — Senior Max	KR Sport	16th
2022	IAME Warriors Final — X30 Senior	KR Sport	116th
2022–23	IAME Series UAE — X30 Senior		3rd
2023	Rotax Max Euro Trophy — Senior Max		35th

== Racing record ==
=== Racing career summary ===
Season	Series	Team	Races	Wins	Poles	F/Laps	Podiums	Points	Position
2023	Formula 4 UAE Championship – Trophy Round	Yas Heat Racing Academy	2	0	0	0	0	—N/a	NC
2024	Formula 4 UAE Championship	Yas Heat Racing Academy	15	0	0	0	0	20	17th
2024	F4 British Championship	Xcel Motorsport	30	0	0	0	1	52	15th
2025	Formula Regional Oceania Championship	mtec Motorsport	15	1	1	2	4	314	**2nd**
2025	Tasman Series	mtec Motorsport	6	2	1	2	7	139	**1st**
2025	Eurocup-3 Spanish Winter Championship	Palou Motorsport	5	0	0	0	0	0	26th
2025	Eurocup-3	Palou Motorsport	18	0	0	0	0	0	34th
2025-26	Asian Le Mans Series - LMP3	R-ace GP	2	0	0	0	0	12	16th
2026	Formula Regional Oceania Trophy	mtec Motorsport	15	3	0	4	2	203	7th
2026	Tasman Series	mtec Motorsport	15	3	0	4	2	203	**3rd**
2026	Le Mans Cup - LMP3	R-ace GP	6	0	0	0	1	19	13rd

^{*} Season still in progress.

=== Complete Formula 4 UAE Championship results ===
(key) (Races in bold indicate pole position; races in italics indicate fastest lap)

Year	Team	1	2	3	4	5	6	7	8	9	10	11	12	13	14	15	DC	Points
2024	Yas Heat Racing Academy	YMC1; 1; 13	YMC1; 2; 11	YMC1; 3; 9	YMC2; 1; 9	YMC2; 2; 8	YMC2; 3; 9	DUB1; 1; 29	DUB1; 2 Ret	DUB1; 3; 5	YMC3; 1; 30†	YMC3; 2 Ret	YMC3; 3; 14	DUB2; 1; 13	DUB2; 2; 13	DUB2; 3; 11	17th	20

=== Complete F4 British Championship results ===
(key) (Races in bold indicate pole position) (Races in italics indicate fastest lap)

Year	Team	1	2	3	4	5	6	7	8	9	10	11	12	13	14	15	16	17	18	19	20	21	22	23	24	25	26	27	28	29	30	31	32	DC	Points
2024	Xcel Motorsport	DPN; 1; 16	DPN; 2; 20	DPN; 3 C	BHI; 1; 19	BHI; 2; 3^{3}	BHI; 3; 14	SNE; 1 Ret	SNE; 2 Ret	SNE; 3; 14	THR; 1 Ret	THR; 2 Ret	THR; 3; 6	SILGP; 1; 19	SILGP; 2; 13^{7}	SILGP; 3; 20	ZAN; 1; 19	ZAN; 2; 10^{10}	ZAN; 3 Ret	KNO; 1; 13	KNO; 2 Ret	KNO; 3; 17	DPGP; 1; 6	DPGP; 2; 9	DPGP; 3 Ret	DPGP; 4; 16	SILN; 1; 22	SILN; 2 C	SILN; 3; 5	BHGP; 1; 10	BHGP; 2; 16	BHGP; 3; 6	BHGP; 4; 16	15th	52

=== Complete Formula Regional Oceania Championship/Trophy results ===
(key) (Races in bold indicate pole position) (Races in italics indicate fastest lap)

Year	Team	1	2	3	4	5	6	7	8	9	10	11	12	13	14	15	16	DC	Points
2025	mtec Motorsport	**TAU**; **1**; 1	TAU; 2; 10	TAU; 3; 3	HMP; 1; 2	HMP; 2; 7	HMP; 3; 2	MAN; 1; 8	MAN; 2; 1	MAN; 3; 8	TER; 1; 5	TER; 2; 2	TER; 3; 8	HIG; 1; 5	HIG; 2; 4	HIG; 3; 2		2nd	314
2026	mtec Motorsport	HMP; 1; 7	HMP; 2; 1	HMP; 3; 17	HMP; 4; 6	TAU; 1; 5	TAU; 2; 15	TAU; 3; 1	TAU; 4 Ret	TER; 1 Ret	TER; 2; 11	TER; 3 C	TER; 4; 11	HIG; 1; 5	HIG; 2; 16	HIG; 3; 10	HIG; 4; 1	7th	203

=== Complete New Zealand Grand Prix results ===
Year	Team	Car	Qualifying	Main race
2025	(New Zealand) mtec Motorsport	Tatuus FT-60 - Toyota	3rd	**2nd**
2026	(New Zealand) mtec Motorsport	Tatuus FT-60 - Toyota	2nd	**1st**

=== Complete Eurocup-3 Spanish Winter Championship results ===
(key) (Races in bold indicate pole position) (Races in italics indicate fastest lap)

Year	Team	1	2	3	4	5	6	7	8	DC	Points
2025	Palou Motorsport	JER; 1	JER; 2	JER; 3	POR; 1; 22	POR; 2; 16	POR; 3; 23	ARA; 1 Ret	ARA; 2; 22	26th	0

=== Complete Eurocup-3 results ===
(key) (Races in bold indicate pole position) (Races in italics indicate fastest lap)

Year	Team	1	2	3	4	5	6	7	8	9	10	11	12	13	14	15	16	17	18	DC	Points
2025	Palou Motorsport	RBR; 1; 18	RBR; 2; 23	POR; 1; 25	POR; SR; 17	POR; 2; 24	LEC; 1; 15	LEC; SR; 19	LEC; 2; 21	MNZ; 1; 20†	MNZ; 2; 22	ASS; 1; 26	ASS; 2; 25	SPA; 1; 20	SPA; 2 Ret	JER; 1; 20	JER; 2; 21	CAT; 1; 22	CAT; 2 Ret	34th	0

=== Complete Le Mans Cup results ===
(key) (Races in bold indicate pole position; results in italics indicate fastest lap)

Year	Entrant	Class	Chassis	1	2	3	4	5	6	Rank	Points
2026	R-ace GP	LMP3	Duqueine D09	BAR; 3	LEC; Ret	LMS; 13	SPA; 14	SIL; 8	POR; 17	13rd	19

^{*} Season still in progress.

Sporting positions
Preceded by Christian Mansell	Tasman Cup Champion; 2025	Succeeded by Louis Sharp
Preceded by Will Brown	Winner of the New Zealand Grand Prix; 2026	Succeeded by Incumbent
