= Turn 3 Motorsport =

(United States) Turn 3 Motorsport
- Founded: 2016
- Founder(s): Peter Dempsey
- Base: Mundelein, Illinois, United States
- Current series: USF Pro 2000 Championship
- Former series: USF2000 Championship
- Current drivers: USF Pro 2000: (United States) 2. Michael Costello (United States) 3. Tyke Durst (Brazil) 4. Leonardo Escorpioni (New Zealand) 22. Sebastian Manson (United States) 44. Brady Golan
- Drivers' Championships: USF Pro 2000 Championship: 2024: Lochie Hughes
- Website: http://www.turn3motorsport.com/

Turn 3 Motorsport is an American motorsport team founded in 2016 by Irish race car driver and coach, Peter Dempsey. Co-owned by Mandy Dempsey, it competes in the USF Pro Championships, including the USF2000 and USF Pro 2000 series.

== History ==
Turn 3 Motorsport was founded in 2016 by race car driver and coach Peter Dempsey. The team specializes in race car preparation, engineering, and driver development. The team competes in the USF Pro Championships.

=== 2019 season ===
Turn 3 Motorsport competed in its inaugural racing season, securing championship titles in the 1340cc, 1500cc, and overall categories of the Blue Marble Cocktails Radical Cup North America with drivers Eric Wagner and Antoine Comeau.

=== NASA 25 Hours of Thunderhill ===
Turn 3 Motorsport won the 2019 NASA 25 Hours of Thunderhill endurance race, leading 638 of 672 laps. The #10 Eastern Radical SR3 RSX 1340 carried drivers Eric Wagner, Antoine Comeau, Neil Alberico, and Peter Dempsey to victory, becoming the first car with an engine capacity of under two liters to win the endurance event in its 16 years of running.

=== 2020 Indy Pro 2000 Championship ===
In its series debut, Turn 3 Motorsport won the season opener of the 2020 Indy Pro 2000 Championship with driver Danial Frost. Throughout the season, the team secured a pole position, earned six podium finishes, and placed third overall in the championship.

=== 2021 Expansion and Success ===
In 2021, Turn 3 Motorsport expanded to a two-car operation in the Cooper Tires USF2000 Championship while continuing their Indy Pro 2000 campaign. The team won the season finale of their inaugural USF2000 season with American driver Josh Green. The team also earned another podium finish and secured fifth place overall in the championship. In the Indy Pro 2000 series, Turn 3 Motorsport won the season finale with driver James Roe and secured a pole position at World Wide Technology Raceway, finishing seventh overall in the championship and fourth in the Indy Pro 2000 Championship.

=== 2022 Road to Indy ===
In 2022, Turn 3 Motorsport achieved podium finishes, a race win, and pole positions in seven out of nine races on the Road to Indy schedule. Drivers Josh Green, Jonathan Browne, and Christian Weir contributed to these accomplishments across the USF2000 and Indy Pro 2000 championships. Spike Kohlbecker also joined Turn 3 Motorsport with Ignite Autosport for the 2022 USF2000 Championship season.

=== 2023 and 2024 ===
In 2023, Turn 3 Motorsport tied for the most wins in the USF Pro 2000 season with drivers Michael d'Orlando and Christian Brooks securing five victories for the team. The team also earned seven pole positions – the most of any team – and four additional podium finishes, ultimately finishing second overall in the Team championship.

In June 2023, Turn 3 Motorsport raced at the newly repaved Road America road course in Wisconsin with a four-car lineup featuring driver Louka St-Jean joining regulars Michael d'Orlando, Jonathan Browne, and Jackson Lee. Turn 3 Motorsport ended the year by securing a win with Michael d’Orlando and a podium finish with Jonathan Browne in the USF Pro 2000 season finale at the VP Racing Fuels Grand Prix of Portland.

In 2024, Turn 3 Motorsport clinched the USF Pro 2000 Championship with driver Lochie Hughes at the Portland International Raceway season finale. Hughes won the season-opening round in St. Petersburg, Florida, and went on to earn seven consecutive podium finishes, including a clean sweep of wins at the Road America tripleheader event. The team secured a total of four pole positions, five wins, and six additional podium finishes, finishing second in the Team Championship.

=== 2025 ===
Turn 3 Motorsport continued its presence in the USF Pro 2000 Championship presented by Continental Tire during the 2025 season with drivers Alessandro de Tullio, Cooper Becklin, Nicholas Monteiro, Tyke Durst, and Brady Golan competing throughout the year. The team earned multiple victories and podium finishes during the season, highlighted by de Tullio scoring four race wins, including a victory on the streets of St. Petersburg, marking the team's fourth consecutive win at the season opener.

The team also recorded strong performances throughout the season including a pair of victories at NOLA Motorsports Park for Alessandro de Tullio, a podium finish for Cooper Becklin in Indianapolis, a win in Toronto for de Tullio, and a podium finish for de Tullio in Portland. De Tullio finished fourth in the final championship standings following a podium finish in the season finale at Portland International Raceway.

== Recognition ==
- Neil O’Donovan and Matthew McComish - Mechanics of the Year in 2024.
- Peter Dempsey - Marelli Engineer of the Year in 2024.

== Drivers ==
=== Current Drivers ===
- (United States) Tyke Durst (2024, 2025, 2026) – USF Pro 2000
- (United States) Brady Golan (2025, 2026) – USF Pro 2000
- (United States) Michael Costello (2026) – USF Pro 2000
- (United States) Sebastian Manson (2026) – USF Pro 2000
- (Brazil) Leonardo Escorpioni (2026) – USF Pro 2000

=== Former Drivers ===
- (Canada) Antoine Comeau (2019) – Radical Cup North America and Indy Pro 2000
- (United States) Eric Wagner (2019) – Radical Cup North America
- (Singapore) Danial Frost (2020) – Indy Pro 2000
- (United States) Dylan Christie (2021) – USF2000 Championship
- (United States) Josh Green (2021-2022) – USF2000 Championship and Indy Pro 2000 Championship
- (United States) Christian Weir (2021-2022) – USF2000 Championship
- (Republic of Ireland) James Roe (2021) – Indy Pro 2000
- (United States) Spike Kohlbecker (2022) – USF2000 Championship
- (Republic of Ireland) Jonathan Browne (2022-2023) – USF Pro 2000
- (United States) Michael d'Orlando (2023) – USF Pro 2000
- (United States) Christian Brooks (2023) – USF Pro 2000
- (United States) Jackson Lee (2023) – USF Pro 2000
- (Canada) Louka St-Jean (2023) – USF Pro 2000
- (Australia) Lochie Hughes (2024) – USF Pro 2000 and Indy Pro 2000
- (United States) Danny Dyszelski (2023-2024) – USF Pro 2000
- (Republic of Ireland) Adam Fitzgerald (2024) – USF Pro 2000
- (United States) Ethan Ho (2024) – USF Pro 2000
- (United States) (Argentina) Alessandro de Tullio (2025) – USF Pro 2000
- (United States) Cooper Becklin (2025) – USF Pro 2000
- (Brazil) Nicholas Monteiro (2025) – USF Pro 2000
- (United States) Elliot Cox (2025) – USF Pro 2000
- (United States) Titus Sherlock (2025) – USF Pro 2000
- (United Kingdom) Joseph Loake (2025) – USF Pro 2000

=== Racing Record ===
Season	Series	Team	Races	Wins	Poles	Podiums	Points	Position
2025	USF Pro 2000 Championship	Turn 3 Motorsport	18	4	4	8	342	4th
2024	USF Pro 2000 Championship	Turn 3 Motorsport	18	5	4	11	395	1st
2023	USF Pro 2000 Championship	Turn 3 Motorsport	18	5	7	4	288	4th
2022	USF Pro 2000 Championship	Turn 3 Motorsport	18	1	3	4	298	6th
2022	USF2000 Championship	Turn 3 Motorsport	18	0	1	2	229	8th
2021	Indy Pro 2000 Championship	Turn 3 Motorsport	18	1	1	0	243	7th
2021	USF2000 Championship	Turn 3 Motorsport	18	1	0	2	279	5th
2020	Indy Pro 2000 Championship	Turn 3 Motorsport	17	1	1	6	329	3rd
2019	Radical Cup North America	Turn 3 Motorsport	18	13	4	11	-	1st
