= 2024 New Zealand Grand Prix =

- Race 3, Round 5 of 5 of the 2024 Formula Regional Oceania Championship
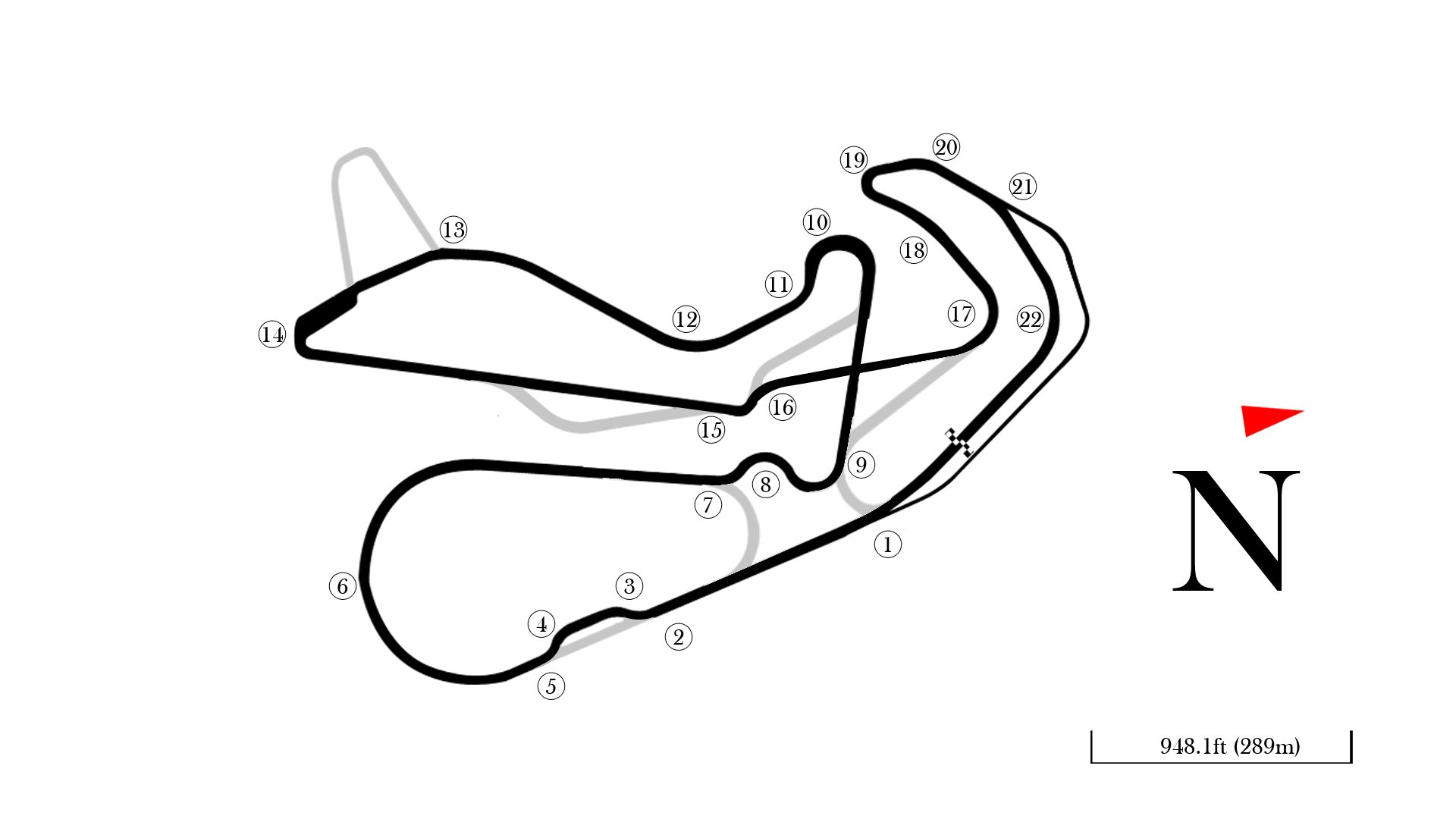

Race details
- Date: 18 February 2024
- Official name: LXVIII New Zealand Grand Prix
- Location: Highlands Motorsport Park, Cromwell, New Zealand
- Course: Permanent racing facility
- Course length: 4.100 km (2.548 miles)
- Distance: 28 laps, 114.8 km (71.3 miles)
- Weather: Sunny

Pole position
Driver	(New Zealand) Liam Sceats	M2 Competition
- Time: 1:27.720

Fastest lap
Driver	(Poland) Roman Bilinski	M2 Competition
- Time: 1:29.398 on lap 15

Podium
First	(New Zealand) Liam Sceats	M2 Competition
Second	(New Zealand) Callum Hedge	mtec Motorsport
Third	(South Korea) Michael Shin	M2 Competition

The 2024 New Zealand Grand Prix event for open wheel racing cars was held at Highlands Motorsport Park in Cromwell, Otago on 18 February 2024. It was the sixty-eighth New Zealand Grand Prix and utilised Formula Regional cars. The event served as the final race of the 2024 Formula Regional Oceania Championship and marked the first time Highlands Motorsport Park hosted the New Zealand Grand Prix.

Liam Sceats enjoyed a lights-to-flag victory driving with M2 Competition. Callum Hedge and Michael Shin rounded out the podium.

== Qualifying ==
=== Qualifying classification ===
Pos.	No.	Driver	Team	Qualifying times			Final grid
Pos.	No.	Driver	Team	Q1	Q2	Q3	Final grid
1	23	(New Zealand) Liam Sceats	M2 Competition	1:28.275	1:28.342	1:27.720	1
2	17	(New Zealand) Callum Hedge	mtec Motorsport	1:28.362	1:28.189	1:27.756	2
3	51	(United States) Jacob Abel	mtec Motorsport	1:28.504	1:28.586	1:27.913	3
4	39	(Hong Kong) Gerrard Xie	M2 Competition	1:28.607	1:28.246	1:28.013	4
5	41	(New Zealand) Alex Crosbie	Giles Motorsport	1:28.690	1:28.643	1:28.043	5
6	27	(United States) Bryce Aron	M2 Competition	1:28.616	1:28.590	1:28.078	6
7	15	(New Zealand) Kaleb Ngatoa	Giles Motorsport	1:28.575	1:28.478	no time	WD
8	16	(South Korea) Michael Shin	M2 Competition	1:28.433	1:28.347	no time	7
9	19	(Australia) Elliott Cleary	mtec Motorsport	1:28.832	1:28.706	N/A	8
10	101	(Australia) Ryder Quinn	M2 Competition	1:28.727	1:28.720	N/A	9
11	14	(Canada) Patrick Woods-Toth	Kiwi Motorsport	1:28.942	1:28.826	N/A	10
12	22	(United States) Jett Bowling	Kiwi Motorsport	1:28.848	1:28.906	N/A	11
13	4	(Poland) Roman Bilinski	M2 Competition	1:28.011	no time	N/A	12
14	69	(New Zealand) Sebastian Manson	Giles Motorsport	1:29.055	N/A	N/A	13
15	31	(United States) Titus Sherlock	Kiwi Motorsport	1:29.254	N/A	N/A	14
16	5	(Brazil) Lucas Fecury	mtec Motorsport	1:29.408	N/A	N/A	15
17	739	(United States) Landan Matriano Lim	Giles Motorsport	1:29.744	N/A	N/A	16
18	20	(United States) Jake Bonilla	Kiwi Motorsport	1:30.410	N/A	N/A	17
107% time: 1:34.172

== Race ==
=== Race classification ===
Pos.	No.	Driver	Teams	Laps	Time/Retired	Grid
1	23	(New Zealand) Liam Sceats	M2 Competition	27	40min 33.290sec	1
2	17	(New Zealand) Callum Hedge	mtec Motorsport	27	+ 5.656 s	2
3	16	(South Korea) Michael Shin	M2 Competition	27	+ 6.069 s	7
4	51	(United States) Jacob Abel	mtec Motorsport	27	+ 7.237 s	3
5	4	(Poland) Roman Bilinski	M2 Competition	27	+ 9.694 s	12
6	27	(United States) Bryce Aron	M2 Competition	27	+ 11.265 s	6
7	41	(New Zealand) Alex Crosbie	Giles Motorsport	27	+ 11.266 s	5
8	101	(Australia) Ryder Quinn	M2 Competition	27	+ 11.611 s	9
9	14	(Canada) Patrick Woods-Toth	Kiwi Motorsport	27	+ 15.094 s	10
10	19	(Australia) Elliott Cleary	mtec Motorsport	27	+ 16.874 s	8
11	22	(United States) Jett Bowling	Kiwi Motorsport	27	+ 19.332 s	11
12	69	(New Zealand) Sebastian Manson	Giles Motorsport	27	+ 24.364 s	13
13	739	(United States) Landan Matriano Lim	Giles Motorsport	27	+ 29.935 s	16
14	5	(Brazil) Lucas Fecury	mtec Motorsport	27	+ 32.473 s	15
15	20	(United States) Jake Bonilla	Kiwi Motorsport	27	+ 38.866 s	17
16	39	(Hong Kong) Gerrard Xie	M2 Competition	24	+ 3 laps	4
Ret	31	(United States) Titus Sherlock	Kiwi Motorsport	10	Retired	14
WD	15	(New Zealand) Kaleb Ngatoa	Giles Motorsport	0	Withdrew (Injury)	
Fastest lap: (Poland) Roman Bilinski (M2 Competition) – 1:29.398 (lap 15)

Preceded by 2023 New Zealand Grand Prix	New Zealand Grand Prix; 2024	Succeeded by 2025 New Zealand Grand Prix
