= 2026 Formula Regional Oceania Trophy =

Motor racing competition

The 2026 Castrol Toyota Formula Regional Oceania Trophy was the inaugural Formula Regional Oceania Trophy and the twenty-first running of the premier open-wheel motorsport category formerly known as the Toyota Racing Series. Known since 2023 as the Formula Regional Oceania Championship, the series was rebranded under the Trophy guise after the FIA introduced a new concept for single-seater championships held over shorter, constrained timeframes. The championship was held in New Zealand over four consecutive weekends in January and February of 2026.

M2 Competition's Ugo Ugochukwu won the Drivers' Championship title at the final race of the season while his team defended their Teams' Championship title for the fourth year running. Mtec Motorsport's Louis Sharp ended the season as the highest-placed Australian or Kiwi driver, thereby winning the Tasman Cup, as his teammate Ryan Wood claimed the Rookie Championship title with three races to spare.

== Teams and drivers ==
All drivers competed with identical Tatuus FT-60 chassis cars powered by 2.0L turbocharged Toyota engines running on 100% fossil-free fuel. The 2026 season saw the introduction of a push-to-pass feature designed to create more on-track battles and overtakes.

Team	No.	Driver	Status	Rounds
(New Zealand) mtec Motorsport	3	(New Zealand) Zack Scoular		All
(New Zealand) mtec Motorsport	5	(China) Yuanpu Cui		All
(New Zealand) mtec Motorsport	11	(New Zealand) Louis Sharp		All
(New Zealand) mtec Motorsport	40	(New Zealand) Ryan Wood	R	All
(New Zealand) M2 Competition	4	(United States) Ugo Ugochukwu		All
(New Zealand) M2 Competition	22	(New Zealand) Sebastian Manson		All
(New Zealand) M2 Competition	24	(Mexico) Ernesto Rivera		All
(New Zealand) M2 Competition	27	(United Kingdom) Freddie Slater		All
(United States) HMD Motorsports with TJ Speed	8	(United States) Trevor LaTourrette	R	All
(United States) HMD Motorsports with TJ Speed	13	(Australia) James Wharton		1–2, 4
(United States) HMD Motorsports with TJ Speed	23	(New Zealand) Liam Sceats		4
(United States) HMD Motorsports with TJ Speed	41	(Brazil) Ricardo Baptista	R	All
(United Kingdom) Hitech	12	(Japan) Jin Nakamura		All
(United Kingdom) Hitech	19	(Japan) Kanato Le		All
(United Kingdom) Hitech	33	(Republic of Ireland) Fionn McLaughlin	R	All
(United Kingdom) Hitech	69	(Finland) Kalle Rovanperä	R	All
(New Zealand) Kiwi Motorsport	14	(United States) Cooper Shipman	R	All
(New Zealand) Kiwi Motorsport	21	(Sri Lanka) Yevan David		All
(New Zealand) Giles Motorsport	50	(Australia) Jack Taylor	R	All
(New Zealand) Giles Motorsport	52	(United States) Nolan Allaer		All

Icon	Status
R	Rookie

== Calendar ==
The 2026 race calendar was announced in July 2025. The adoption of the Formula Regional Trophy format saw the number of race weekends reduced to four, with the race tally staying at 15 races. To achieve this, the weekend format of the opening three rounds was changed, with each round holding four races. The reduction in venues saw Circuit Chris Amon leave the calendar for the first time since 2022. The third race of the penultimate round was postponed to the final race weekend.

Round		Circuit	Date	Feature race	Support bill	Map of circuit locations
1	R1	Hampton Downs Motorsport Park (Hampton Downs, North Waikato)	10 January	Dorothy Smith Memorial Cup	GT Racing New Zealand; Bridgestone GR86 Championship; New Zealand Porsche Series Championship	2026 Formula Regional Oceania Trophy is located in New Zealand
1	R2	Hampton Downs Motorsport Park (Hampton Downs, North Waikato)	10 January	Dorothy Smith Memorial Cup	GT Racing New Zealand; Bridgestone GR86 Championship; New Zealand Porsche Series Championship	2026 Formula Regional Oceania Trophy is located in New Zealand
1	R3	Hampton Downs Motorsport Park (Hampton Downs, North Waikato)	11 January	Dorothy Smith Memorial Cup	GT Racing New Zealand; Bridgestone GR86 Championship; New Zealand Porsche Series Championship	2026 Formula Regional Oceania Trophy is located in New Zealand
1	R4	Hampton Downs Motorsport Park (Hampton Downs, North Waikato)	11 January	Dorothy Smith Memorial Cup	GT Racing New Zealand; Bridgestone GR86 Championship; New Zealand Porsche Series Championship	2026 Formula Regional Oceania Trophy is located in New Zealand
2	R5	Taupo International Motorsport Park (Taupō, Waikato)	17 January	Denny Hulme Memorial Trophy	Historic Saloons, Sports, and GTs; NZ Historic Sports Sedans; Heritage Touring Cars New Zealand; Formula Atlantic NZ Historic; Historic & Vintage Racing Association NZ	2026 Formula Regional Oceania Trophy is located in New Zealand
2	R6	Taupo International Motorsport Park (Taupō, Waikato)	17 January	Denny Hulme Memorial Trophy	Historic Saloons, Sports, and GTs; NZ Historic Sports Sedans; Heritage Touring Cars New Zealand; Formula Atlantic NZ Historic; Historic & Vintage Racing Association NZ	2026 Formula Regional Oceania Trophy is located in New Zealand
2	R7	Taupo International Motorsport Park (Taupō, Waikato)	18 January	Denny Hulme Memorial Trophy	Historic Saloons, Sports, and GTs; NZ Historic Sports Sedans; Heritage Touring Cars New Zealand; Formula Atlantic NZ Historic; Historic & Vintage Racing Association NZ	2026 Formula Regional Oceania Trophy is located in New Zealand
2	R8	Taupo International Motorsport Park (Taupō, Waikato)	18 January	Denny Hulme Memorial Trophy	Historic Saloons, Sports, and GTs; NZ Historic Sports Sedans; Heritage Touring Cars New Zealand; Formula Atlantic NZ Historic; Historic & Vintage Racing Association NZ	2026 Formula Regional Oceania Trophy is located in New Zealand
3	R9	Teretonga Park (Invercargill, Southland District)	24 January	Spirit of a Nation Cup	Bridgestone GR86 Championship; NZ Mazda Pro7 Racing New Zealand; Super GT New Zealand Race Series; TA2 NZ Championship; NZ Formula Ford Championship	2026 Formula Regional Oceania Trophy is located in New Zealand
3	R10	Teretonga Park (Invercargill, Southland District)	25 January	Spirit of a Nation Cup	Bridgestone GR86 Championship; NZ Mazda Pro7 Racing New Zealand; Super GT New Zealand Race Series; TA2 NZ Championship; NZ Formula Ford Championship	2026 Formula Regional Oceania Trophy is located in New Zealand
3	R11	Teretonga Park (Invercargill, Southland District)	25 January	Spirit of a Nation Cup	Bridgestone GR86 Championship; NZ Mazda Pro7 Racing New Zealand; Super GT New Zealand Race Series; TA2 NZ Championship; NZ Formula Ford Championship	2026 Formula Regional Oceania Trophy is located in New Zealand
3	R12	Teretonga Park (Invercargill, Southland District)	25 January	Spirit of a Nation Cup	Bridgestone GR86 Championship; NZ Mazda Pro7 Racing New Zealand; Super GT New Zealand Race Series; TA2 NZ Championship; NZ Formula Ford Championship	2026 Formula Regional Oceania Trophy is located in New Zealand
4	R11 (Note: The third race of round 3 at Teretonga Park was postponed due to time constraints caused by adverse weather conditions, and was rescheduled to be the first race of round 4 at Highlands Motorsport Park. This meant that the third race of the final round awarded the reduced points normally awarded for race two.)	Highlands Motorsport Park (Cromwell, Otago)	30 January	New Zealand Grand Prix	Bridgestone GR86 Championship; TA2 NZ Championship; Super GT New Zealand Race Series; Formula Atlantic NZ Historic	2026 Formula Regional Oceania Trophy is located in New Zealand
4	R13	Highlands Motorsport Park (Cromwell, Otago)	31 January	New Zealand Grand Prix	Bridgestone GR86 Championship; TA2 NZ Championship; Super GT New Zealand Race Series; Formula Atlantic NZ Historic	2026 Formula Regional Oceania Trophy is located in New Zealand
4	R14	Highlands Motorsport Park (Cromwell, Otago)	31 January	New Zealand Grand Prix	Bridgestone GR86 Championship; TA2 NZ Championship; Super GT New Zealand Race Series; Formula Atlantic NZ Historic	2026 Formula Regional Oceania Trophy is located in New Zealand
4	R15	Highlands Motorsport Park (Cromwell, Otago)	1 February	New Zealand Grand Prix	Bridgestone GR86 Championship; TA2 NZ Championship; Super GT New Zealand Race Series; Formula Atlantic NZ Historic	2026 Formula Regional Oceania Trophy is located in New Zealand

== Season report ==
The 2026 season began at Hampton Downs with M2's Ugo Ugochukwu on pole position for the season opener. Mtec Motorsport's Louis Sharp started alongside him and took the lead right away at the start, while Hitech TGR's Kanato Le slotted into third. Ugochukwu kept within one second of the leader throughout the race, but was unable to mount an attack as Sharp won the opening race of the season. Kiwi Motorsport’s Yevan David started race two from reversed-grid pole position, but the second grid spot proved to be better once again as mtec's Zack Scoular moved past him off the line. After a short safety car, David was attacked by Hitech's Jin Nakamura and locked up, letting Nakamura and M2's Freddie Slater past. By that point, Scoular had built a gap that saw him able to take the win. Race three had M2's Ernesto Rivera on pole position, but a slow start saw him drop to third behind Le and Ugochukwu. The latter then took the lead on lap eight, holding off Le after a safety car to claim victory. Ugochukwu also claimed pole position for the feature race, retaining the lead at the start before a four-car crash caused a red flag. He held off Nakamura and Le after the restart to take victory again and end the weekend with an 18-point championship lead.

Mtec's Ryan Wood claimed pole position ahead of Ugochukwu for the first race at Taupo. The pair went side-by-side at the start, but Wood managed to stay ahead and began building a gap to claim victory by 2.5 seconds. Ugochukwu came under pressure by Scoular before the latter locked up and handed the final podium spot to Slater. Le started the reversed-grid race two on pole position and held off Rivera at the start, allowing Wharton to get past the Mexican into turn two. Wharton then quickly closed up to the leader and pressured him until the Japanese made a mistake on lap seven and Wharton moved into first place. Le tumbled down the order afterwards, finishing in seventh, while Rivera and Ugochukwu completed the podium behind Wharton. Scoular started race three from the front, and used his fresher tyres to stay there after defending from Slater and Wood. While battles were fought all throughout the race, the top three remained static until the end. Giles Motorsport's Jack Taylor was fastest in qualifying for the feature race, but Wood took the lead right away and never looked back, taking victory ahead of Le and Sharp. Ugochukwu came fourth, his championship lead now 31 points over Le and Sharp.

Round three at Teretonga Park was disrupted by rain throughout, with qualifying red-flagged multiple times before Rivera was able to claim pole position after Nakamura was penalised for causing a red flag. He spun off at the first turn of the very wet first race, handing the lead to Slater and causing a safety car. Slater led Nakamura from the restart, throughout a second safety car period caused by Scoular hitting the wall, to claim the first victory of his campaign, while Hitech's Kalle Rovanperä claimed his maiden single-seater podium in third. With weather conditions worsening afterwards, race two was postponed to Sunday, with the third race moved to round four. Ugochukwu had pole position for the second race, which was also interrupted by two safety car periods. The American remained faultless throughout to lead Wood to his third victory, with Kiwi's Cooper Shipman claiming third on the final restart. Slater had pole position for the feature race, which began in dry conditions. He led Ugochukwu, Sharp and Nakamura until it started to rain and the race was red-flagged. Ugochukwu made a mistake and went off track at the restart, falling to fourteenth, with Slater winning to close up to 22 points behind him in the championship.

The final weekend of the year at Highlands Motorsport Park began with the postponed third race of round three. Slater started that encounter from pole position and converted it into a lights-to-flag victory. Ugochukwu took second off Le at the start to minimize the damage to his points lead, while the Japanese dropped to fourth behind Sharp. Up next was qualifying, where Nakamura took pole position for both the second race of the weekend and the Grand Prix. He failed to hold on to his lead in race two as he lost out to Ugochukwu, who was then able to hold off the Japanese driver and secure his fourth victory of the campaign. Sharp took third after defending from Scoular before the latter spun off and rejoined at the back. Le had pole position for the reversed-grid third race, and he was never attacked on the way to victory as Wharton and his teammate Liam Sceats spent the race fighting over second, with Wharton coming out on top. Ugochukwu entered the final race 26 points ahead of Slater, but started in 13th after an exclusion from the Q3 session. He was able to climb up to ninth, enough to secure the title by 16 points as Slater only managed to finish fourth, while the Grand Prix was won by Scoular ahead of Nakamura and Le after the polesitter bogged down at the start.

== Race results ==
Round		Circuit	Pole position	Fastest lap	Winning driver	Winning team
1	R1	Hampton Downs Motorsport Park	(United States) Ugo Ugochukwu	(United States) Ugo Ugochukwu	(New Zealand) Louis Sharp	(New Zealand) mtec Motorsport
1	R2	Hampton Downs Motorsport Park		(Mexico) Ernesto Rivera	(New Zealand) Zack Scoular	(New Zealand) mtec Motorsport
1	R3	Hampton Downs Motorsport Park		(New Zealand) Zack Scoular	(United States) Ugo Ugochukwu	(New Zealand) M2 Competition
1	R4	Hampton Downs Motorsport Park	(United States) Ugo Ugochukwu	(Japan) Jin Nakamura	(United States) Ugo Ugochukwu	(New Zealand) M2 Competition
2	R5	Taupo International Motorsport Park	(New Zealand) Ryan Wood	(New Zealand) Ryan Wood	(New Zealand) Ryan Wood	(New Zealand) mtec Motorsport
2	R6	Taupo International Motorsport Park		(New Zealand) Zack Scoular	(Australia) James Wharton	(United States) HMD Motorsports with TJ Speed
2	R7	Taupo International Motorsport Park		(New Zealand) Zack Scoular	(New Zealand) Zack Scoular	(New Zealand) mtec Motorsport
2	R8	Taupo International Motorsport Park	(Australia) Jack Taylor	(New Zealand) Ryan Wood	(New Zealand) Ryan Wood	(New Zealand) mtec Motorsport
3	R9	Teretonga Park	(Mexico) Ernesto Rivera (Note: Jin Nakamura set the fastest time in qualifying but received a 3-place grid penalty for bringing out a red flag during the session. Ernesto Rivera, who set the second fastest time, was promoted to pole position.)	(United Kingdom) Freddie Slater	(United Kingdom) Freddie Slater	(New Zealand) M2 Competition
3	R10	Teretonga Park		(United States) Ugo Ugochukwu	(United States) Ugo Ugochukwu	(New Zealand) M2 Competition
3	R11	Teretonga Park		Race postponed due to adverse weather conditions		
3	R12	Teretonga Park	(United Kingdom) Freddie Slater	(United States) Ugo Ugochukwu	(United Kingdom) Freddie Slater	(New Zealand) M2 Competition
4	R11	Highlands Motorsport Park		(New Zealand) Ryan Wood	(United Kingdom) Freddie Slater	(New Zealand) M2 Competition
4	R13	Highlands Motorsport Park	(Japan) Jin Nakamura	(United States) Ugo Ugochukwu	(United States) Ugo Ugochukwu	(New Zealand) M2 Competition
4	R14	Highlands Motorsport Park		(Australia) James Wharton	(Japan) Kanato Le	(United Kingdom) Hitech
4	R15	Highlands Motorsport Park	(Japan) Jin Nakamura	(New Zealand) Zack Scoular	(New Zealand) Zack Scoular	(New Zealand) mtec Motorsport

== Championship standings ==
=== Scoring system ===
The adoption of the Formula Regional Trophy format that saw a fourth race added to the first three rounds of the season prompted a change in the weekend format of these three rounds. Two qualifying sessions were now held at each weekend, with the first session forming the grid for the first race and the second the grid for the fourth race. The grid for the second race was formed by reversing the top eight finishers of race one, while the grid for the third race was formed by taking the fastest lap of each drivers set during the first two races.

The fourth round of the year retained the format previously used for the New Zealand Grand Prix: One qualifying session was held, divided into three parts, with the slowest cars eliminated after the end of each segment. The results of this session formed the grid for the Grand Prix, while the results of Q1 formed the grid for the first race and the grid for the second race was formed by reversing the top eight finishers of race one.

Points were awarded as follows:

Races	Position																			
Races	1st	2nd	3rd	4th	5th	6th	7th	8th	9th	10th	11th	12th	13th	14th	15th	16th	17th	18th	19th	20th
Races 1, 3 & 4	35	31	27	24	22	20	18	16	14	12	10	9	8	7	6	5	4	3	2	1
Race 2	20	18	16	14	12	10	9	8	7	6	5	4	3	2	1					

=== Drivers' Championship ===
Pos	Driver	HMP				TAU				TER				HIG				Pts
Pos	Driver	R1	R2	R3	R4	R5	R6	R7	R8	R9	R10	R11	R12	R11	R13	R14	R15	Pts
1	(United States) Ugo Ugochukwu	**2**	5	1	**1**	2	3	11	4	8	1	C	14	2	1	7	9	326
2	(United Kingdom) Freddie Slater	6	3	9	4	3	8	2	17	1	15	C	**1**	1	4	5	4	310
3	(New Zealand) Louis Sharp	1	13	11	5	4	4	4	3	12	8	C	2	3	3	4	6	295
4	(Japan) Jin Nakamura	5	2	4	2	9	14	6	5	2	Ret	C	3	10	**2**	8	**2**	293
5	(New Zealand) Ryan Wood	4	4	18	Ret	**1**	5	3	1	7	2	C	8	6	5	6	5	276
6	(Japan) Kanato Le	3	14	2	3	8	7	7	2	4	16	C	DNS	4	8	1	3	272
7	(New Zealand) Zack Scoular	7	1	17	6	5	15	1	Ret	Ret	11	C	11	5	16	10	1	203
8	(Australia) James Wharton	10	17	5	10	6	1	5	16						6	2	8	167
9	(China) Yuanpu Cui	11	18	8	9	10	6	Ret	6	11	12	C	4	7	12	Ret	14	157
10	(Sri Lanka) Yevan David	8	6	7	Ret	11	18	8	13	Ret	9	C	5	8	9	9	13	152
11	(Mexico) Ernesto Rivera	9	Ret	3	8	7	2	14	7	**Ret**	10	C	Ret	14	18†	WD	WD	134
12	(United States) Nolan Allaer	14	9	10	7	12	13	9	8	15†	13	C	12	15	10	11	15	133
13	(Republic of Ireland) Fionn McLaughlin	13	7	12	11	17	19	15	14	9	7	C	6	12	15	13	11	124
14	(Australia) Jack Taylor	15	10	14	Ret	15	12	13	**11**	5	4	C	9	9	13	12	Ret	123
15	(United States) Cooper Shipman	Ret	8	15	12	18	16	10	15	6	3	C	13	11	17	14	17†	108
16	(Finland) Kalle Rovanperä	17	12	13	Ret	16	10	12	9	3	5	C	7	DNS	WD	WD	WD	107
17	(New Zealand) Sebastian Manson	12	16	6	Ret	13	17	17	10	10	6	C	Ret	13	11	Ret	10	105
18	(Brazil) Ricardo Baptista	16	15	16	13	14	9	Ret	12	14	14	C	10	16	14	15†	12	86
19	(United States) Trevor LaTourrette	18	11	Ret	14	19	11	16	18	13	Ret	C	15	17	19†	NC	16†	55
20	(New Zealand) Liam Sceats														7	3	7	52
Pos	Driver	R1	R2	R3	R4	R5	R6	R7	R8	R9	R10	R11	R12	R11	R13	R14	R15	Pts
Pos	Driver	HMP				TAU				TER				HIG				Pts

Colour	Result
Gold	Winner
Silver	Second place
Bronze	Third place
Green	Points classification
Blue	Non-points classification
Blue	Non-classified finish (NC)
Purple	Retired, not classified (Ret)
Red	Did not qualify (DNQ)
Red	Did not pre-qualify (DNPQ)
Black	Disqualified (DSQ)
White	Did not start (DNS)
White	Withdrew (WD)
White	Race cancelled (C)
Blank	Did not practice (DNP)
Blank	Did not arrive (DNA)
Blank	Excluded (EX)

**Bold** – Pole

Italics – Fastest Lap

† — Did not finish, but classified (completed more than 75% of race distance)

Rookie

=== Teams' Championship ===
Each team acquired the points earned by their two highest finishing drivers in each race.

Pos	Team	HMP				TAU				TER				HIG				Pts
Pos	Team	R1	R2	R3	R4	R5	R6	R7	R8	R9	R10	R11	R12	R11	R13	R14	R15	Pts
1	(New Zealand) M2 Competition	2	3	1	1	2	2	2	4	1	1	C	1	1	1	5	4	682
1	(New Zealand) M2 Competition	6	5	3	4	3	3	11	7	8	6	C	14	2	4	7	9	682
2	(New Zealand) mtec Motorsport	1	1	8	5	1	4	1	1	7	2	C	2	3	3	4	1	658
2	(New Zealand) mtec Motorsport	4	4	11	6	4	5	3	3	11	8	C	4	5	5	6	5	658
3	(United Kingdom) Hitech	3	2	2	2	8	7	6	2	2	5	C	3	4	2	1	2	620
3	(United Kingdom) Hitech	5	7	4	3	9	10	7	5	3	7	C	6	10	8	8	3	620
4	(United States) HMD Motorsports with TJ Speed	10	11	5	10	6	1	5	12	13	14	C	10	16	6	2	7	315
4	(United States) HMD Motorsports with TJ Speed	16	15	16	13	14	9	16	16	14	Ret	C	15	17	7	3	8	315
5	(New Zealand) Kiwi Motorsport	8	6	7	12	11	16	8	13	6	3	C	5	8	9	9	13	262
5	(New Zealand) Kiwi Motorsport	Ret	8	15	Ret	18	18	10	15	Ret	9	C	13	11	17	14	17†	262
6	(New Zealand) Giles Motorsport	14	9	10	7	12	12	9	8	5	4	C	9	9	10	11	15	256
6	(New Zealand) Giles Motorsport	15	10	14	Ret	15	13	13	11	15†	13	C	12	15	13	12	Ret	256
Pos	Team	R1	R2	R3	R4	R5	R6	R7	R8	R9	R10	R11	R12	R11	R13	R14	R15	Pts
Pos	Team	HMP				TAU				TER				HIG				Pts

=== Tasman Cup ===
Pos	Driver	HMP				TAU				TER				HIG				Pts
Pos	Driver	R1	R2	R3	R4	R5	R6	R7	R8	R9	R10	R11	R12	R11	R13	R14	R15	Pts
1	(New Zealand) Louis Sharp	1	13	11	5	4	4	4	3	12	8	C	2	3	3	4	6	295
2	(New Zealand) Ryan Wood	4	4	18	Ret	**1**	5	3	1	7	2	C	8	6	5	6	5	276
3	(New Zealand) Zack Scoular	7	1	17	6	5	15	1	Ret	Ret	11	C	11	5	16	10	1	203
4	(Australia) James Wharton	10	17	5	10	6	1	5	16						6	2	8	167
5	(Australia) Jack Taylor	15	10	14	Ret	15	12	13	**11**	5	4	C	9	9	13	12	Ret	123
6	(New Zealand) Sebastian Manson	12	16	6	Ret	13	17	17	10	10	6	C	Ret	13	11	Ret	10	105
7	(New Zealand) Liam Sceats														7	3	7	52
Pos	Driver	R1	R2	R3	R4	R5	R6	R7	R8	R9	R10	R11	R12	R11	R13	R14	R15	Pts
Pos	Driver	HMP				TAU				TER				HIG				Pts
