= Taupo International Motorsport Park =

Motorsports circuit in New Zealand

- International Circuit (2006)
- Location: Taupō, New Zealand
- Coordinates: 38°39′56″S 176°8′39″E
- FIA Grade: 3
- Owner: Tony Quinn (November 2021–present)
- Opened: 1959
- Former names: Bruce McLaren Motorsport Park (November 2015–December 2021); Taupo Motorsport Park (1959–November 2015)
- Major events: Current: Supercars Championship; Taupō Super 440 (2024–present); FR Oceania (2006–2019, 2023–present); GR86 Championship New Zealand (2014, 2016–2017, 2021–present); Former: Carrera Cup Australia (2024); A1GP (2007–2009)
- Website: http://www.tauporacetrack.co.nz

Track 1 (2008–present)
- Length: 3.321 km (2.064 mi)
- Turns: 14
- Race lap record: 1:14.679 ( (Switzerland) Neel Jani, Lola A1GP, 2008, A1GP)

International Circuit (2006)
- Length: 3.500 km (2.175 mi)
- Turns: 17

Original Circuit (1959–2006)
- Length: 1.398 km (0.869 mi)
- Turns: 6

Taupo International Motorsport Park and Events Centre (previously known as the Bruce McLaren Motorsport Park) is a motorsports circuit located in Broadlands Road, Taupō, New Zealand. It is owned by Tony Quinn who also owns Highlands Motorsport Park and Hampton Downs Motorsport Park.

The circuit was an upgrade from a 1.398 km (0.869 mi) Taupo Car Club's circuit to the new 3.500 km (2.175 mi) international layout in 2006. The Motorsport Park was completed in 2006 at the cost of NZ$13 million. It features driver training facilities, a motorsport business park with 13 first floor corporate suites and a second floor race control, corporate and catering complex.

== History ==
On 21 January 2007 Taupo Motorsport Park hosted the sixth race in the 2006–07 A1 Grand Prix season and on 20 January 2008 it hosted the fifth race in the 2007–08 A1 Grand Prix season. In order to create more overtaking opportunities, a tighter chicane was introduced at the end of the straight. On 25 January 2009 Taupo Motorsport Park hosted the fourth race in the 2008–09 A1 Grand Prix season. Owing to the tight 'S' bend close to the start causing collisions in the past, the rolling start was replaced by a standing start for the 2009 event's Sprint race.

The Taupo Race Track project has received a Silver Award by the Association of Consulting Engineers New Zealand, praising the high-quality delivery of the project, which was designed and constructed in tandem to achieve very tight deadlines. However, on 8 May 2008 Newstalk ZB reported that the motorsport park was NZ$3 million in debt and the owners were seeking equity to help keep their business afloat.

The circuit was renamed Bruce McLaren Motorsport Park on 26 November 2015, as a tribute to former Formula One driver and team owner Bruce McLaren (1937–1970). The renaming occurred as Taupo directors announced they would be rebuilding the circuit to maintain its FIA Grade 2 status. However, the circuit is renamed Taupo International Motorsport Park, after Tony Quinn purchased the circuit in November 2021.

In January 2026, the circuit hosted Giltrap Group Taupo Historic Grand Prix, with the main drawcard being Johnny Reid and the Black Beauty A1GP car.

== The circuit ==
The track includes four alternative configurations (consisting of 3.400 km (2.113 mi), 3.321 km (2.064 mi), 2.200 km (1.367 mi) and 1.300 km (0.808 mi)), two separate pit areas, a three-story pit lane complex with 32 ground floor pit garages that is currently under construction. The track also features an NHRA standard 830 m (2,720 ft) long, 17 m (56 ft) wide dragstrip with full capacity viewing for 10,000. The motor racing circuit has various licences ranging from National Grade 1 Motorsport Licence, FIA Grade 2 Motorsport Licence and International Motorcycling Safety Standards depending on which track configuration. A1 Team Ireland's driver Adam Carroll commented that the track has few bumps and is technical and tight.

== Lap records ==
The unofficial all-time track record is 1:14.072, set by Nico Hülkenberg on the qualifying of 2006–07 A1 Grand Prix of Nations, New Zealand. As of April 2026, the fastest official race lap records at the Taupo International Motorsport Park are listed as:

Category	Time	Driver	Vehicle	Date
Track 1: 3.321 km (2.064 mi) (2007–present)
A1GP	1:14.679	(Switzerland) Neel Jani	Lola A1GP	20 January 2008
Formula Regional	1:23.095	(New Zealand) Zack Scoular	Tatuus FT-60	17 January 2026
Toyota Racing Series	1:23.357	(India) Jehan Daruvala	Tatuus FT-50	7 February 2016
Formula Atlantic	1:23.669	(New Zealand) Kaleb Ngatoa	Swift DB4	12 January 2025
Daytona Prototype (GTRNZ)	1:24.495	(New Zealand) Glenn Smith	Crawford DP03	14 April 2019
Superbike	1:25.573	(New Zealand) Mitch Rees	Honda CBR1000RR SP	15 March 2025
GT3 (GTRNZ GT1)	1:26.528	(New Zealand) Glenn Smith	McLaren 650S GT3 X	23 November 2024
Porsche Carrera Cup	1:27.2983	(Australia) Jackson Walls	Porsche 911 (992 I) GT3 Cup	20 April 2024
Supercars Championship	1:27.3233	(Australia) Broc Feeney	Ford Mustang GT	11 April 2026
NZV8	1:27.5139	(New Zealand) Grant Brennan	Chevrolet Corvette	12 April 2025
Central Muscle Cars	1:32.1979	(New Zealand) Andrew Knight	Chevrolet Camaro Z28	11 April 2026
TA2	1:32.7813	(New Zealand) Caleb Byers	Chevrolet Camaro TA2	11 April 2026
GR86 Championship New Zealand	1:40.0632	(New Zealand) Ajay Giddy	Toyota GR86	11 April 2026
Mazda Racing Series	1:42.402	(New Zealand) Rex Edwards	Mazda RX-8	24 November 2024

== Other events ==
In a break from the usual open-road courses, Athletics New Zealand selected the Taupo Motorsport Park as the venue for 2024 New Zealand Road Relay Championships.
