= GR86 Championship New Zealand =

Car racing tournament in New Zealand

- Category: One-make racing by Toyota
- Country: New Zealand
- Inaugural season: 2013
- Constructors: Toyota
- Tyre suppliers: Bridgestone
- Drivers' champion: (New Zealand) Chris White
- Official website: Official website

The GR86 Championship New Zealand (known for commercial reasons as the Bridgestone GR86 Championship New Zealand) is a one-make sports car racing series by Toyota based in New Zealand. Toyota GR86 Championship cars are based on the Toyota 86 (GR86).

== Summary ==
After the rousing success of the Toyota Racing Series open wheel racing series that had garnered international attention, the TR86 championship was conceived as a means for providing a viable - both practically and financially - grassroots pathway for young up-and-coming drivers, as well as 'gentlemen drivers'. The purchase price of a vehicle was $78,000 plus GST and included a Motec data dash as well as an additional set of 18-inch alloy wheels. The cars were also eligible to be adapted for various other categories of motorsport outside the championship.

The first season of the championship took place in 2013 and was run across six rounds throughout the New Zealand summer. A scheduled three-hour endurance race at Pukekohe Park Raceway was cancelled. The inaugural grid comprised a mix of established, seasoned drivers as well as Toyota Racing Series alumni. One of these drivers, Jamie McNee, would become the inaugural champion.

== Circuits ==
- **Bold** denotes a circuit is used in the 2026 season.

Number	Circuits	Rounds	Years
1	(New Zealand) **Hampton Downs Motorsport Park**	19	2013–present
2	(New Zealand) **Taupo International Motorsport Park**	12	2013–2018, 2020–present
2	(New Zealand) Pukekohe Park Raceway	12	2013–2023
4	(New Zealand) **Manfeild: Circuit Chris Amon**	11	2013–2021, 2022–2024, 2025–present
5	(New Zealand) **Teretonga Park**	9	2014–2020, 2022–2023, 2024–present
6	(New Zealand) **Highlands Motorsport Park**	7	2013–2014, 2018–2019, 2021–present
7	(New Zealand) Euromarque Motorsport Park	6	2014–2018, 2021–2022, 2023–2024

== Points system ==
2013–present

Position	1st	2nd	3rd	4th	5th	6th	7th	8th	9th	10th	11th	12th	13th	14th	15th	16th	17th	18th	19th	20th	21st	22nd	23rd	24th	25th	26th	27th	28th	29th	30th
Points	75	67	60	54	49	45	42	39	36	33	30	28	26	24	22	20	18	16	14	12	10	9	8	7	6	5	4	3	2	1

== Champions ==
Season	Champion
2013–14	(New Zealand) Jamie McNee
2014–15	(New Zealand) Tom Alexander
2015–16	(New Zealand) Ash Blewett
2016–17	(New Zealand) Ryan Yardley
2017–18	(New Zealand) Jack Milligan
2018–19	(New Zealand) Callum Hedge
2019–20	(New Zealand) Peter Vodanovich
2020-21	(New Zealand) Rowan Shepherd
2021-22	(New Zealand) Rowan Shepherd
2022-23	(New Zealand) Brock Gilchrist
2023-24	(New Zealand) Tom Bewley
2024–25	(New Zealand) Hugo Allan
2025–26	(New Zealand) Chris White

== See also ==
- Formula Regional Oceania Trophy
- GR Cup
