= M2 Competition =

New Zealand-based auto-racing team

(New Zealand) (Belgium) M2 Competition
- Founded: 2010
- Founder(s): Jonathan Moury; Mark Pilcher
- Team principal(s): Elise Moury (co-owner); Jonathan Moury (co-owner); Mark Pilcher(co-owner)
- Current series: Formula Regional Oceania Championship
- Former series: Formula Renault Eurocup; F4 Spanish Championship; Toyota Finance 86 Championship; British GT Championship
- Current drivers: (United States) Ugo Ugochukwu (New Zealand) Sebastian Manson (Mexico) Ernesto Rivera (United Kingdom) Freddie Slater
- Drivers' Championships: Toyota Racing Series/Formula Regional Oceania Championship: 2013: Nick Cassidy; 2015: Lance Stroll; 2016: Lando Norris; 2018: Robert Shwartzman; 2019: Liam Lawson; 2020: Igor Fraga; 2021: Matthew Payne; 2023: Charlie Wurz; 2024: Roman Bilinski; 2025: Arvid Lindblad
- Website: m2-automotive.com

M2 Competition are a motorsport team based in New Zealand and Belgium.

== History ==
Founded in 2010, M2 Competition began partaking in the New Zealand-based single-seater championship the Castrol Toyota Racing Series in 2011, with Ivan Lukashevich taking the team's first win at Manfeild. The following year, the team achieved their second victory and first pole position from Jordan King at Taupo. In 2013, the team saw their first champion crowned with Nick Cassidy claiming his second successive title. Since then, the team has taken Lance Stroll, Lando Norris, Robert Shwartzman and Liam Lawson to the TRS title as well as fielding the likes of Earl Bamber, Alex Lynn, Raffaele Marciello, Marcus Armstrong and Richard Verschoor.

In November 2018, it was announced M2 would expand into Europe by competing in the 2019 Formula Renault Eurocup championship under a Belgian license.

== Current series results ==
=== Toyota Racing Series / Formula Regional Oceania Championship ===
Year	Car	Drivers	Races	Wins	Poles	F.L.	Podiums	Points	D.C.
2011	Tatuus-Toyota	(Russia) Ivan Lukashevich	12	1	0	0	2	531	7th
2011	Tatuus-Toyota	(Australia) Jordan Skinner	15	0	0	0	0	410	11th
2011	Tatuus-Toyota	(Japan) Kotaro Sakurai	12	0	0	0	0	325	14th
2011	Tatuus-Toyota	(New Zealand) Earl Bamber	6	0	0	0	0	164	15th
2011	Tatuus-Toyota	(New Zealand) Ken Smith	3	0	0	0	0	78	17th
2012	Tatuus-Toyota	(United Kingdom) Jordan King	15	1	1	0	4	591	5th
2012	Tatuus-Toyota	(France) Nathanaël Berthon	15	0	0	0	0	555	7th
2012	Tatuus-Toyota	(Italy) Raffaele Marciello	15	1	0	0	2	535	9th
2012	Tatuus-Toyota	(Thailand) Tanart Sathienthirakul	15	0	0	0	0	383	14th
2012	Tatuus-Toyota	(India) Sheban Siddiqi	15	0	0	0	0	212	20th
2013	Tatuus-Toyota	(New Zealand) Nick Cassidy	15	1	0	6	10	915	1st
2013	Tatuus-Toyota	(United Kingdom) Alex Lynn	15	3	3	2	9	803	2nd
2013	Tatuus-Toyota	(Netherlands) Steijn Schothorst	15	1	0	1	5	754	4th
2013	Tatuus-Toyota	(Norway) Dennis Olsen	15	0	0	0	0	410	13th
2013	Tatuus-Toyota	(Australia) Spike Goddard	15	0	0	0	0	262	17th
2013	Tatuus-Toyota	(Republic of Ireland) Ryan Cullen	6	0	0	0	0	122	20th
2013	Tatuus-Toyota	(Netherlands) Pieter Schothorst	3	0	0	0	0	67	21st
2014	Tatuus-Toyota	(Netherlands) Steijn Schothorst	15	2	1	1	5	630	4th
2014	Tatuus-Toyota	(Russia) Egor Orudzhev	15	3	1	1	8	595	6th
2014	Tatuus-Toyota	(Switzerland) Levin Amweg	15	0	0	0	0	409	11th
2014	Tatuus-Toyota	(Brazil) Gustavo Lima	15	0	0	0	0	405	12th
2014	Tatuus-Toyota	(Australia) Macauley Jones	15	0	0	0	0	340	18th
2014	Tatuus-Toyota	(Brazil) Pedro Piquet	9	0	0	0	0	140	23rd
2015	Tatuus FT-50-Toyota	(Canada) Lance Stroll	15	4	0	1	10	906	1st
2015	Tatuus FT-50-Toyota	(France) Brandon Maïsano	15	5	4	5	8	798	2nd
2015	Tatuus FT-50-Toyota	(India) Arjun Maini	15	2	4	2	5	750	4th
2015	Tatuus FT-50-Toyota	(Republic of Ireland) Charlie Eastwood	15	0	0	1	2	535	7th
2015	Tatuus FT-50-Toyota	(Denmark) Mathias Kristensen	15	0	0	0	0	502	11th
2015	Tatuus FT-50-Toyota	(New Zealand) Jamie Conroy	15	1	0	0	1	446	15th
2016	Tatuus FT-50-Toyota	(United Kingdom) Lando Norris	15	6	8	5	11	924	1st
2016	Tatuus FT-50-Toyota	(India) Jehan Daruvala	15	3	1	3	6	789	2nd
2016	Tatuus FT-50-Toyota	(Brazil) Pedro Piquet	15	2	1	3	7	710	5th
2016	Tatuus FT-50-Toyota	(China) Guanyu Zhou	15	1	0	1	4	685	6th
2016	Tatuus FT-50-Toyota	(Russia) Artem Markelov	15	0	0	0	5	588	8th
2016	Tatuus FT-50-Toyota	(Canada) Kami Laliberté	15	0	0	0	0	386	13th
2017	Tatuus FT-50-Toyota	(Brazil) Pedro Piquet	15	3	0	0	8	850	2nd
2017	Tatuus FT-50-Toyota	(New Zealand) Marcus Armstrong	15	3	1	0	8	792	4th
2017	Tatuus FT-50-Toyota	(India) Jehan Daruvala	15	2	5	2	9	781	5th
2017	Tatuus FT-50-Toyota	(Austria) Ferdinand Habsburg	15	0	0	0	2	552	8th
2017	Tatuus FT-50-Toyota	(Canada) Kami Laliberté	15	0	0	0	0	498	10th
2017	Tatuus FT-50-Toyota	(France) Jean Baptiste Simmenauer	15	0	0	0	0	248	19th
2018	Tatuus FT-50-Toyota	(Russia) Robert Shwartzman	15	1	3	2	9	916	1st
2018	Tatuus FT-50-Toyota	(Netherlands) Richard Verschoor	15	6	4	4	12	911	2nd
2018	Tatuus FT-50-Toyota	(New Zealand) Marcus Armstrong	15	2	1	1	10	901	3rd
2018	Tatuus FT-50-Toyota	(United States) Juan Manuel Correa	15	2	1	2	3	756	4th
2018	Tatuus FT-50-Toyota	(United Kingdom) James Pull	15	0	0	0	3	692	6th
2019	Tatuus FT-50-Toyota	(New Zealand) Liam Lawson	15	5	4	5	11	356	1st
2019	Tatuus FT-50-Toyota	(New Zealand) Marcus Armstrong	15	5	2	5	10	346	2nd
2019	Tatuus FT-50-Toyota	(Austria) Lucas Auer	15	1	3	1	7	270	3rd
2019	Tatuus FT-50-Toyota	(Belgium) Esteban Muth	15	1	0	0	3	263	5th
2019	Tatuus FT-50-Toyota	(United States) Cameron Das	15	1	0	2	2	205	7th
2019	Tatuus FT-50-Toyota	(Russia) Artem Petrov	15	1	0	1	3	181	9th
2020	Tatuus FT-60-Toyota	(Brazil) Igor Fraga	15	4	3	3	9	362	1st
2020	Tatuus FT-60-Toyota	(New Zealand) Liam Lawson	15	5	3	7	10	356	2nd
2020	Tatuus FT-60-Toyota	(Japan) Yuki Tsunoda	15	1	0	0	3	257	4th
2020	Tatuus FT-60-Toyota	(Israel) Ido Cohen	15	0	0	0	0	164	9th
2020	Tatuus FT-60-Toyota	(France) Émilien Denner	13	1	0	0	1	72	15th
2020	Tatuus FT-60-Toyota	(Angola) Rui Andrade	15	0	0	0	0	70	16th
2021	Tatuus FT-60-Toyota	(New Zealand) Matthew Payne	9	5	6	5	9	287	1st
2021	Tatuus FT-60-Toyota	(New Zealand) Kaleb Ngatoa	9	0	1	0	3	229	2nd
2021	Tatuus FT-60-Toyota	(New Zealand) Billy Frazer	9	1	0	0	3	201	3rd
2021	Tatuus FT-60-Toyota	(New Zealand) Chris Vlok	9	0	0	0	0	149	6th
2021	Tatuus FT-60-Toyota	(New Zealand) Shane van Gisbergen	3	3	1	3	3	105	7th
2021	Tatuus FT-60-Toyota	(New Zealand) Josh Bethune	3	0	0	0	0	23	14th
2023	Tatuus FT-60-Toyota	(Austria) Charlie Wurz	15	4	4	1	7	343	1st
2023	Tatuus FT-60-Toyota	(New Zealand) Callum Hedge	15	3	4	3	9	329	2nd
2023	Tatuus FT-60-Toyota	(New Zealand) Liam Sceats	15	0	0	1	3	245	4th
2023	Tatuus FT-60-Toyota	(United States) David Morales	15	1	0	1	2	200	6th
2023	Tatuus FT-60-Toyota	(Australia) Ryder Quinn	15	0	0	0	2	199	7th
2023	Tatuus FT-60-Toyota	(Netherlands) Laurens van Hoepen	6	1	2	1	5	154	11th
2024	Tatuus FT-60-Toyota	(Poland) Roman Bilinski	15	6	5	5	12	385	1st
2024	Tatuus FT-60-Toyota	(New Zealand) Liam Sceats	15	3	2	4	8	342	2nd
2024	Tatuus FT-60-Toyota	(South Korea) Michael Shin	15	1	0	1	5	245	4th
2024	Tatuus FT-60-Toyota	(Hong Kong) Gerrard Xie	14	1	1	0	2	206	6th
2024	Tatuus FT-60-Toyota	(Italy) Nicola Lacorte	9	1	0	1	2	130	10th
2024	Tatuus FT-60-Toyota	(United States) Bryce Aron	6	1	0	1	1	99	15th
2024	Tatuus FT-60-Toyota	(Australia) Ryder Quinn	3	0	0	0	0	30	21st
2025	Tatuus FT-60-Toyota	(United Kingdom) Arvid Lindblad	15	6	6	6	12	370	1st
2025	Tatuus FT-60-Toyota	(United States) Nikita Johnson	15	1	0	1	6	305	3rd
2025	Tatuus FT-60-Toyota	(Peru) Matías Zagazeta	15	2	1	1	4	244	5th
2025	Tatuus FT-60-Toyota	(New Zealand) Sebastian Manson	15	2	0	0	2	225	6th
2025	Tatuus FT-60-Toyota	(South Korea) Michael Shin	15	0	0	1	2	197	8th
2025	Tatuus FT-60-Toyota	(Chinese Taipei) Enzo Yeh	15	0	0	0	0	149	11th
2026	Tatuus FT-60-Toyota	(United States) Ugo Ugochukwu	15	4	2	4	8	326	1st
2026	Tatuus FT-60-Toyota	(United Kingdom) Freddie Slater	15	3	1	1	6	310	2nd
2026	Tatuus FT-60-Toyota	(Mexico) Ernesto Rivera	13	0	1	1	2	134	11th
2026	Tatuus FT-60-Toyota	(New Zealand) Sebastian Manson	15	0	0	0	0	105	17th

=== Toyota Finance 86 Championship / GR86 Championship New Zealand ===
Year	Car	Drivers	Races	Wins	Poles	F/Laps	Podiums	Points	D.C.
2017-18	Toyota 86	(New Zealand) Peter Vodanovich	9	0	0	0	1	422	9th
2018-19	Toyota 86	(New Zealand) Connor Davison	18	0	0	0	0	541	12th
2019-20	Toyota 86	(New Zealand) Campbell Stewart	12	0	0	0	2	567	5th
2019-20	Toyota 86	(New Zealand) Connor Davison	9	0	0	0	0	246	15th
2024-25	Toyota GR86	(New Zealand) Josh Bethune	18	4	4	4	8	904	2nd
2024-25	Toyota GR86	(Australia) Cooper Barnes	17	1	2	2	6	804	5th
2024-25	Toyota GR86	(New Zealand) Cameron Hill	18	1	0	1	2	512	10th
2024-25	Toyota GR86	(New Zealand) Hayden Lines	18	0	0	0	0	261	21st
2025-26	Toyota GR86	(New Zealand) Josh Bethune	17	2	0	2	7	874	4th
2025-26	Toyota GR86	(Australia) Cooper Barnes	17	1	0	0	5	785	7th
2025-26	Toyota GR86	(New Zealand) Cameron Hill	17	1	0	0	1	561	11th
2025-26	Toyota GR86	(New Zealand) Simon Hunter	11	0	0	0	0	385	13th
2025-26	Toyota GR86	(New Zealand) Thomas Mallard	3	0	0	0	0	74	19th

== Former series results ==
=== Formula Renault Eurocup ===
Year	Car	Drivers	Races	Wins	Poles	F.L.	Podiums	Points	D.C.	T.C.
2019	Tatuus F3 T-318	(India) Kush Maini	14	0	0	0	1	74	6th	5th
2019	Tatuus F3 T-318	(United States) Yves Baltas	6	0	0	0	0	3	19th	5th
2019	Tatuus F3 T-318	(Belgium) Esteban Muth	2	0	0	0	0	0	25th	5th
2019	Tatuus F3 T-318	(Germany) Lucas Alecco Roy	8	0	0	0	0	2	20th	5th
2019	Tatuus F3 T-318	(South Africa) Callan O'Keeffe	2	0	0	0	0	1	17th	5th
2019	Tatuus F3 T-318	(Switzerland) Patrick Schott	4	0	0	0	0	0	22nd	5th
2020	Tatuus F3 T-318	(Russia) Michael Belov	10	0	0	0	0	40	13th	8th

=== F4 Spanish Championship ===
Year	Car	Drivers	Races	Wins	Poles	F/Laps	Podiums	Points	D.C.	T.C.
2020	Tatuus F4-T014	(France) Émilien Denner	3	0	0	0	0	0	28th	NC

=== British GT Championship ===
Year	Car	Drivers	Races	Wins	Poles	F/Laps	Podiums	Points	D.C.	T.C.
2019	Aston Martin Vantage AMR GT3	(United Kingdom) Tony Quinn (United Kingdom) Darren Turner	1	0	0	0	0	0	NC	NC

== Timeline ==
Current series
Formula Regional Oceania Trophy	2011–2021, 2023–present
GR86 Championship New Zealand	2017–present
Former series
British GT Championship	2019
Formula Renault Eurocup	2019–2020
F4 Spanish Championship	2020
