= 2019–20 Toyota Finance 86 Championship =

The 2019–2020 Toyota 86 Championship (known for commercial reasons as the 2019–20 Best Bars Toyota 86 Championship) was the seventh running of the Toyota Finance 86 Championship. The championship began on 30 November 2019 at Pukekohe Park Raceway and concluded on 16 February 2020 at Manfeild: Circuit Chris Amon.

As a result of the COVID-19 pandemic, the championship faced significant delays after the fourth round at Manfeild. After initially aiming to resume the championship in a one-off round at Hampton Downs Motorsport Park, the decision was made to declare the championship as title contender Jaylyn Robotham would not be able to attend said event owing to travel restrictions. Consequently, Peter Vodanovich was declared the series champion.

== Race calendar ==
Round		Circuit	Date	Map
1	R1	Pukekohe Park Raceway (Pukekohe, Auckland Region)	30 November 2019	2019–20 Toyota Finance 86 Championship is located in New Zealand
1	R2	Pukekohe Park Raceway (Pukekohe, Auckland Region)	1 December 2019	2019–20 Toyota Finance 86 Championship is located in New Zealand
1	R3	Pukekohe Park Raceway (Pukekohe, Auckland Region)	1 December 2019	2019–20 Toyota Finance 86 Championship is located in New Zealand
2	R1	Highlands Motorsport Park (Cromwell, Otago)	18 January 2020	2019–20 Toyota Finance 86 Championship is located in New Zealand
2	R2	Highlands Motorsport Park (Cromwell, Otago)	19 January 2020	2019–20 Toyota Finance 86 Championship is located in New Zealand
2	R3	Highlands Motorsport Park (Cromwell, Otago)	19 January 2020	2019–20 Toyota Finance 86 Championship is located in New Zealand
3	R1	Teretonga Park (Invercargill, Southland Region)	25 January 2020	2019–20 Toyota Finance 86 Championship is located in New Zealand
3	R2	Teretonga Park (Invercargill, Southland Region)	26 January 2020	2019–20 Toyota Finance 86 Championship is located in New Zealand
3	R3	Teretonga Park (Invercargill, Southland Region)	26 January 2020	2019–20 Toyota Finance 86 Championship is located in New Zealand
4	R1	Manfeild: Circuit Chris Amon (Feilding, Manawatū District)	15 February 2020	2019–20 Toyota Finance 86 Championship is located in New Zealand
4	R2	Manfeild: Circuit Chris Amon (Feilding, Manawatū District)	16 February 2020	2019–20 Toyota Finance 86 Championship is located in New Zealand
4	R3	Manfeild: Circuit Chris Amon (Feilding, Manawatū District)	16 February 2020	2019–20 Toyota Finance 86 Championship is located in New Zealand
C	R1	~~Hampton Downs Motorsport Park~~; ~~(Hampton Downs, North Waikato)~~	~~28 March 2020~~	2019–20 Toyota Finance 86 Championship is located in New Zealand
C	R2	~~Hampton Downs Motorsport Park~~; ~~(Hampton Downs, North Waikato)~~	~~29 March 2020~~	2019–20 Toyota Finance 86 Championship is located in New Zealand
C	R3	~~Hampton Downs Motorsport Park~~; ~~(Hampton Downs, North Waikato)~~	~~29 March 2020~~	2019–20 Toyota Finance 86 Championship is located in New Zealand
C	R1	~~Pukekohe Park Raceway~~; ~~(Pukekohe, Auckland Region)~~	~~25 April 2020~~	2019–20 Toyota Finance 86 Championship is located in New Zealand
C	R2	~~Pukekohe Park Raceway~~; ~~(Pukekohe, Auckland Region)~~	~~26 April 2020~~	2019–20 Toyota Finance 86 Championship is located in New Zealand
C	R3	~~Pukekohe Park Raceway~~; ~~(Pukekohe, Auckland Region)~~	~~26 April 2020~~	2019–20 Toyota Finance 86 Championship is located in New Zealand

== Teams and drivers ==
All teams are New-Zealand registered.

Team	No.	Driver	Rounds
Tony Richards Motorsport	8	(New Zealand) Flynn Mullany	1, 4
International Motorsport	9	(New Zealand) Connor Adam	All
International Motorsport	10	(New Zealand) Brock Gilchrist	All
International Motorsport	99	(New Zealand) Justin Allen	All
International Motorsport	222	(New Zealand) Todd Foster	All
CareVets Racing Team	17	(New Zealand) Ryan Wood	All
CareVets Racing Team	18	(New Zealand) Tayler Bryant	All
Darkhorse Racing	21	(New Zealand) Andrew Jackson	All
Darkhorse Racing	98	(New Zealand) Leo Bult	All
Jay Robotham Racing	29	(Australia) Jaylyn Robotham	All
Adrenaline Industries Racing	37	(Australia) Richard Peasey	All
Phillips Motorsport	43	(New Zealand) Brayden Philips	All
Neale Motorsport	53	(New Zealand) Jaden Ransley	All
Peter Vodanovich Motorsport	84	(New Zealand) Peter Vodanovich	All
Kaizen Racing	86	(Australia) James Wilkins	All
M2 Competition	95	(New Zealand) Connor Davison	1–2, 4
M2 Competition	97	(New Zealand) Campbell Stewart	All

== Results and standings ==
=== Season summary ===
The 2019–20 calendar was announced on 30 April 2019. Each round was scheduled to have three races each, with qualifying taking place for both races one and three. Following the distruption of the COVID-19 pandemic, the final two rounds at Hampton Downs and Pukekohe were initially delayed, and then cancelled entirely.

Round		Circuit	Pole position	Fastest lap	Winning driver	Winning team
2019
1	R1	Pukekohe Park Raceway	(New Zealand) Jaden Ransley	(Australia) Jaylyn Robotham	(New Zealand) Jaden Ransley	Neale Motorsport
1	R2	Pukekohe Park Raceway		(New Zealand) Brock Gilchrist	(Australia) Jaylyn Robotham	Jaylyn Robotham Racing
1	R3	Pukekohe Park Raceway		(New Zealand) Jaden Ransley	(Australia) Jaylyn Robotham	Jaylyn Robotham Racing
2020
2	R1	Highlands Motorsport Park	(New Zealand) Peter Vodanovich	(New Zealand) Peter Vodanovich	(New Zealand) Peter Vodanovich	Peter Vodanovich Motorsport
2	R2	Highlands Motorsport Park		(New Zealand) Jaden Ransley	(New Zealand) Peter Vodanovich	Peter Vodanovich Motorsport
2	R3	Highlands Motorsport Park		(New Zealand) Jaden Ransley	(New Zealand) Jaden Ransley	Neale Motorsport
3	R1	Teretonga Park	(Australia) Jaylyn Robotham	(New Zealand) Peter Vodanovich	(Australia) Jaylyn Robotham	Jaylyn Robotham Racing
3	R2	Teretonga Park		(New Zealand) Peter Vodanovich	(Australia) Jaylyn Robotham	Jaylyn Robotham Racing
3	R3	Teretonga Park		(New Zealand) Ryan Wood	(New Zealand) Peter Vodanovich	Peter Vodanovich Motorsport
4	R1	Manfeild: Circuit Chris Amon	(New Zealand) Connor Adam	(New Zealand) Peter Vodanovich	(New Zealand) Peter Vodanovich	Peter Vodanovich Motorsport
4	R2	Manfeild: Circuit Chris Amon		(New Zealand) Peter Vodanovich	(Australia) Jaylyn Robotham	Jaylyn Robotham Racing
4	R3	Manfeild: Circuit Chris Amon		(New Zealand) Peter Vodanovich	(New Zealand) Peter Vodanovich	Peter Vodanovich Motorsport

=== Championship standings ===
Pos.	Driver	PUK			HIG			TER			MAN			Pts
Pos.	Driver	R1	R2	R3	R1	R2	R3	R1	R2	R3	R1	R2	R3	Pts
1	(New Zealand) Peter Vodanovich	5	2	3	1	1	2	2	2	1	1	2	1	819
2	(Australia) Jaylyn Robotham	2	1	1	4	3	3	1	1	2	2	1	2	817
3	(New Zealand) Jaden Ransley	1	3	2	2	2	1	4	4	3	4	4	3	747
4	(New Zealand) Connor Adam	4	7	10	3	4	6	5	8	4	3	3	5	602
5	(New Zealand) Campbell Stewart	15	5	7	5	5	4	3	3	5	7	5	6	567
6	(New Zealand) Brock Gilchrist	3	4	4	6	11	Ret	9	6	6	12	8	8	489
7	(New Zealand) Justin Allen	6	8	6	9	7	5	15	10	11	5	7	7	474
8	(Australia) Richard Peasey	8	9	5	7	14	7	6	Ret	10	8	6	9	427
9	(Australia) James Wilkins	11	15	13	11	8	9	10	7	8	6	16	4	420
10	(New Zealand) Ryan Wood	Ret	6	9	8	6	12	7	5	7	11	9	14	404
11	(New Zealand) Andrew Jackson	9	11	8	10	10	10	12	11	12	9	11	10	386
12	(New Zealand) Brayden Phillips	12	13	11	13	9	8	8	9	9	16	15	13	358
13	(New Zealand) Leo Bult	10	10	14	14	DSQ	11	11	12	14	13	12	11	308
14	(New Zealand) Tayler Bryant	14	14	15	16	13	15	14	13	15	14	13	16	286
15	(New Zealand) Connor Davison	7	12	12	12	Ret	14				10	10	12	246
16	(New Zealand) Todd Foster	DNS	Wth	Wth	15	12	13	13	14	13	15	14	15	220
17	(New Zealand) Flynn Mullany	13	Ret	Ret							DNS	Wth	Wth	46
Pos.	Driver	R1	R2	R3	R1	R2	R3	R1	R2	R3	R1	R2	R3	Pts
Pos.	Driver	PUK			HIG			TER			MAN			Pts
