= 2024–25 GR86 Championship New Zealand =

Motor racing competition

The 2024–25 GR86 Championship New Zealand (known for commercial reasons as the 2024–25 Bridgestone GR86 Championship New Zealand) was the twelfth running of the one-make sports car racing series and the first using the newer Toyota GR86 model. The championship was held in New Zealand over six weekends, starting at Hampton Downs Motorsport Park in October 2025, going through to Taupo International Motorsport Park in April 2026.

The championship was won by Hugo Allan.

== Calendar ==
The calendar for the season was announced in September 2024. The first round at Hampton Downs was held on the international layout whilst the second visit saw the championship run on the shorter national layout.

Round		Circuit	Date	Map
1	R1	Taupo International Motorsport Park (Taupō, Waikato)	23 November 2024	2024–25 GR86 Championship New Zealand is located in New Zealand
1	R2	Taupo International Motorsport Park (Taupō, Waikato)	24 November 2024	2024–25 GR86 Championship New Zealand is located in New Zealand
1	R3	Taupo International Motorsport Park (Taupō, Waikato)	24 November 2024	2024–25 GR86 Championship New Zealand is located in New Zealand
2	R1	Hampton Downs Motorsport Park (Hampton Downs, North Waikato)	18 January 2025	2024–25 GR86 Championship New Zealand is located in New Zealand
2	R2	Hampton Downs Motorsport Park (Hampton Downs, North Waikato)	19 January 2025	2024–25 GR86 Championship New Zealand is located in New Zealand
2	R3	Hampton Downs Motorsport Park (Hampton Downs, North Waikato)	19 January 2025	2024–25 GR86 Championship New Zealand is located in New Zealand
3	R1	Teretonga Park (Invercargill, Southland Region)	1 February 2025	2024–25 GR86 Championship New Zealand is located in New Zealand
3	R2	Teretonga Park (Invercargill, Southland Region)	2 February 2025	2024–25 GR86 Championship New Zealand is located in New Zealand
3	R3	Teretonga Park (Invercargill, Southland Region)	2 February 2025	2024–25 GR86 Championship New Zealand is located in New Zealand
4	R1	Highlands Motorsport Park (Cromwell, Otago)	8 February 2025	2024–25 GR86 Championship New Zealand is located in New Zealand
4	R2	Highlands Motorsport Park (Cromwell, Otago)	9 February 2025	2024–25 GR86 Championship New Zealand is located in New Zealand
4	R3	Highlands Motorsport Park (Cromwell, Otago)	9 February 2025	2024–25 GR86 Championship New Zealand is located in New Zealand
5	R1	Hampton Downs Motorsport Park (Hampton Downs, North Waikato)	22 March 2025	2024–25 GR86 Championship New Zealand is located in New Zealand
5	R2	Hampton Downs Motorsport Park (Hampton Downs, North Waikato)	23 March 2025	2024–25 GR86 Championship New Zealand is located in New Zealand
5	R3	Hampton Downs Motorsport Park (Hampton Downs, North Waikato)	23 March 2025	2024–25 GR86 Championship New Zealand is located in New Zealand
6	R1	Taupo International Motorsport Park (Taupō, Waikato)	12 April 2025	2024–25 GR86 Championship New Zealand is located in New Zealand
6	R2	Taupo International Motorsport Park (Taupō, Waikato)	13 April 2025	2024–25 GR86 Championship New Zealand is located in New Zealand
6	R3	Taupo International Motorsport Park (Taupō, Waikato)	13 April 2025	2024–25 GR86 Championship New Zealand is located in New Zealand

== Teams and drivers ==
All drivers compete with identical Toyota GR86 cars on the Bridgestone Potenza RE-71RS tyres.

Team	No.	Driver	Status	Rounds
Action Motorsport	4	(Australia) Jack Westbury	R	5–6
Action Motorsport	22	(New Zealand) John Penny	M	1–2, 6
Action Motorsport	24	(Australia) Lachlan Evennett		2–4
Action Motorsport	30	(New Zealand) Emerson Vincent	R	All
Action Motorsport	37	(Australia) Jett Murray		All
Race Lab Academy	5	(New Zealand) Dion Pitt		3–4
Race Lab Academy	8	(New Zealand) Thomas Mallard		All
Race Lab Academy	42	(New Zealand) Simon Hunter	M	All
Race Lab Academy	50	(Australia) Alice Buckley		1–2
Race Lab Academy	81	(New Zealand) Cormac Murphy		All
Mackenzie Motorsport	10	(New Zealand) Ajay Giddy	R	All
Mackenzie Motorsport	20	(New Zealand) Hayden Bakkerus		All
Mackenzie Motorsport	73	(New Zealand) Harry Townshend		All
Mackenzie Motorsport	90	(New Zealand) Zach Blincoe	R	All
Mackenzie Motorsport	222	(New Zealand) Arthur Broughan	R	All
Mackenzie Motorsport	922	(Australia) Cameron McLeod		6
iMac Engineering	11	(New Zealand) Will Morton		All
CareVets Racing	17	(New Zealand) Hugo Allan		All
Right Karts by M2 Competition	32	(New Zealand) Josh Bethune		All
Right Karts by M2 Competition	35	(New Zealand) Hayden Lines	R	All
Right Karts by M2 Competition	43	(New Zealand) Cameron Hill	R	All
Right Karts by M2 Competition	186	(Australia) Cooper Barnes		All
James Marshall Motorsport	33	(New Zealand) Caleb Byers	R	All
James Marshall Motorsport	34	(New Zealand) Raymond Mallin	R	1–4
James Marshall Motorsport	76	(New Zealand) Will Kitching	R	6
James Marshall Motorsport	88	(New Zealand) Chris White	R	All
James Marshall Motorsport	888	(New Zealand) Blake Knowles	R	1–4
Syndicate Motorsport	47	(New Zealand) Mason Potter	R	All
Syndicate Motorsport	99	(New Zealand) Justin Allen		All
Dayle ITM Racing	55	(New Zealand) Christina Orr-West	M	All
Neale Motorsport	92	(New Zealand) Mac Templeton	R	5–6

== Results and standings ==
=== Season summary ===
Round		Circuit	Pole position	Fastest lap	Winning driver	Winning team
1	R1	Taupo International Motorsport Park	(New Zealand) Hayden Bakkerus	(New Zealand) Josh Bethune	(New Zealand) Hayden Bakkerus	Mackenzie Motorsport
1	R2	Taupo International Motorsport Park		(New Zealand) Hayden Bakkerus	(New Zealand) Emerson Vincent	Action Motorsport
1	R3	Taupo International Motorsport Park	(New Zealand) Hayden Bakkerus	(New Zealand) Hayden Bakkerus	(New Zealand) Hugo Allan	CareVets Racing
2	R1	Hampton Downs Motorsport Park	(New Zealand) Arthur Broughan	(New Zealand) Cameron Hill	(New Zealand) Justin Allen	Syndicate Motorsport
2	R2	Hampton Downs Motorsport Park		(Australia) Cooper Barnes	(Australia) Lachlan Evennett	Action Motorsport
2	R3	Hampton Downs Motorsport Park	(New Zealand) Arthur Broughan	(New Zealand) Hugo Allan	(New Zealand) Cameron Hill	Right Karts by M2 Competition
3	R1	Teretonga Park	(Australia) Cooper Barnes	(New Zealand) Chris White	(New Zealand) Chris White	James Marshall Motorsport
3	R2	Teretonga Park		(New Zealand) Justin Allen	(Australia) Cooper Barnes	Right Karts by M2 Competition
3	R3	Teretonga Park	(Australia) Cooper Barnes	(New Zealand) Caleb Byers	(New Zealand) Justin Allen	Syndicate Motorsport
4	R1	Highlands Motorsport Park	(New Zealand) Hugo Allan	(New Zealand) Hayden Bakkerus	(New Zealand) Hugo Allan	CareVets Racing
4	R2	Highlands Motorsport Park		(New Zealand) Josh Bethune	(New Zealand) Josh Bethune	Right Karts by M2 Competition
4	R3	Highlands Motorsport Park	(New Zealand) Hugo Allan	(New Zealand) Hayden Bakkerus	(New Zealand) Josh Bethune	Right Karts by M2 Competition
5	R1	Hampton Downs Motorsport Park	(New Zealand) Josh Bethune	(New Zealand) Josh Bethune	(New Zealand) Justin Allen	Syndicate Motorsport
5	R2	Hampton Downs Motorsport Park		(New Zealand) Josh Bethune	(New Zealand) Chris White	James Marshall Motorsport
5	R3	Hampton Downs Motorsport Park	(New Zealand) Josh Bethune	(Australia) Cooper Barnes	(New Zealand) Josh Bethune	Right Karts by M2 Competition
6	R1	Taupo International Motorsport Park	(New Zealand) Josh Bethune	(New Zealand) Hugo Allan	(New Zealand) Josh Bethune	Right Karts by M2 Competition
6	R2	Taupo International Motorsport Park		(New Zealand) Ajay Giddy	(New Zealand) Hugo Allan	CareVets Racing
6	R3	Taupo International Motorsport Park	(New Zealand) Josh Bethune	(New Zealand) Chris White	(New Zealand) Hugo Allan	CareVets Racing

=== Championship standings ===
Pos.	Driver	TAU1			HMP1			TER			HIG			HMP2			TAU2			Pts
Pos.	Driver	R1	R2	R3	R1	R2	R3	R1	R2	R3	R1	R2	R3	R1	R2	R3	R1	R2	R3	Pts
1	(New Zealand) Hugo Allan	2	2	1	6	4	3	13	11	7	1	7	3	4	4	4	6	1	1	974
2	(New Zealand) Josh Bethune	8	3	DSQ	4	3	4	5	DSQ	14	10	1	1	3	3	1	1	5	5	904
3	(New Zealand) Justin Allen	5	9	7	1	7	9	2	5	1	Ret	19	13	1	6	3	7	3	3	853
4	(New Zealand) Hayden Bakkerus	1	6	2	11	6	5	4	2	3	2	3	2	7	5	21	Ret	15	7	846
5	(Australia) Cooper Barnes	6	23	3	24	25	2	8	1	4	6	8	4	2	9	2	3	6	9	804
6	(New Zealand) Chris White	3	8	23	4	5	12	1	18	6	3	4	5	9	1	5	5	16	6	803
7	(New Zealand) Zach Blincoe	4	5	Ret	5	13	14	11	7	9	8	2	6	6	Ret	9	2	2	4	730
8	(New Zealand) Arthur Broughan	12	10	4	7	8	10	21	9	5	12	6	19	8	7	8	10	13	17	588
9	(Australia) Jett Murray	15	15	14	19	17	18	12	3	11	7	5	9	10	2	6	20	12	10	567
10	(New Zealand) Cameron Hill	17	17	19	8	2	1	6	Ret	13	19	17	14	18	15	13	8	10	15	512
11	(New Zealand) Harry Townshend	22	12	11	3	16	Ret	9	4	18	16	9	15	15	12	12	15	23	11	454
12	(New Zealand) Simon Hunter	18	18	10	15	12	8	Ret	Wth	Wth	9	Ret	7	11	11	10	9	4	14	439
13	(New Zealand) Emerson Vincent	9	1	16	9	11	7	DSQ	6	Ret	Ret	13	21	22	10	23	17	9	25	395
14	(New Zealand) Mason Potter	14	7	8	17	9	6	17	Ret	DNS	13	21	16	5	Ret	19	11	Ret	8	390
15	(Australia) Lachlan Evennett				10	1	11	3	14	2	4	Ret	8							382
16	(New Zealand) Caleb Byers	20	11	12	14	DSQ	13	10	10	20	11	14	18	21	16	20	14	7	24	378
17	(New Zealand) Cormac Murphy	13	Ret	6	25	15	21	7	17	Ret	5	22	DSQ	12	Ret	15	13	11	13	349
18	(New Zealand) Ajay Giddy	21	22	21	23	23	Ret	18	Ret	8	23	20	12	16	17	16	4	21	2	322
19	(New Zealand) Christina Orr-West	24	13	18	18	24	20	16	19	19	15	12	11	17	13	22	23	19	19	301
20	(New Zealand) Thomas Mallard	11	21	13	13	22	15	19	13	12	20	DNS	DNS	23	19	18	18	Ret	20	264
21	(New Zealand) Hayden Lines	16	17	17	12	21	Ret	Ret	15	16	21	15	17	19	14	14	24	20	22	261
22	(New Zealand) Will Morton	23	20	20	20	20	17	20	16	15	17	16	Ret	20	18	17	22	17	18	255
23	(New Zealand) Blake Knowles	19	16	15	16	10	Ret	15	8	10	22	18	20							225
24	(New Zealand) John Penny	10	4	9	21	18	Ret										19	14	16	207
25	(New Zealand) Raymond Mallin	25	14	22	26	19	16	22	Ret	Ret	14	10	10							177
26	(Australia) Jack Westbury													13	20	11	12	8	12	158
27	(Australia) Alice Buckley	7	24	5	22	14	19													145
28	(New Zealand) Mac Templeton													14	8	7	16	22	23	142
29	(New Zealand) Dion Pitt							14	12	17	18	11	Ret							116
30	(New Zealand) Will Kitching																21	18	21	36
31	(Australia) Cameron McLeod																Ret	Wth	Wth	-15
Pos.	Driver	R1	R2	R3	R1	R2	R3	R1	R2	R3	R1	R2	R3	R1	R2	R3	R1	R2	R3	Pts
Pos.	Driver	TAU1			HMP1			TER			HIG			HMP2			TAU2			Pts
