= Peter Vodanovich =

New Zealand racing driver

- Nationality: New Zealand
- Born: 6 February 2001 (age 25) Auckland, New Zealand

U.S. F2000 National Championship career
- Debut season: 2021
- Current team: Jay Howard Driver Development
- Car number: 9
- Starts: 16
- Wins: 0
- Poles: 0
- Fastest laps: 1
- Best finish: 20th in 2021

Previous series
- 2021 2019-20 2019 2018-19 2017-18: Toyota Racing Series; Toyota Finance 86 Championship; Toyota 86 Racing Series; Toyota Finance 86 Championship; Toyota Finance 86 Championship

Championship titles
- 2019-20: Toyota Finance 86 Championship

Peter Vodanovich (born 6 February 2001) is a New Zealand racing driver. He last competed in the U.S. F2000 National Championship with Jay Howard Driver Development.

== Racing record ==
=== Career summary ===
Season	Series	Team	Races	Wins	Poles	F/Laps	Podiums	Points	Position
2017-18	Toyota Finance 86 Championship	M2 Competition	9	0	0	0	1	422	9th
2018-19	Toyota Finance 86 Championship	Peter Vodanovich Motorsport	18	1	1	1	7	895	4th
2019-20	Toyota Finance 86 Championship	Peter Vodanovich Motorsport	15	8	2	4	14	819	1st
2021	Toyota Racing Series	Giles Motorsport	9	0	0	1	3	167	5th
2021	U.S. F2000 National Championship	Jay Howard Driver Development	16	0	0	1	0	63	20th

*Season still in progress.

== Motorsports career results ==
=== American open-wheel racing results ===
==== U.S. F2000 National Championship ====
(key) (Races in bold indicate pole position) (Races in italics indicate fastest lap) (Races with * indicate most race laps led)

Year	Team	1	2	3	4	5	6	7	8	9	10	11	12	13	14	15	16	17	18	Rank	Points
2021	**Jay Howard Driver Development**	ALA; 23	ALA; 23	STP; 21	STP; 15	IMS; 19	IMS; 15	IMS; 16	LOR; 23	ROA; 16	ROA; 15	MOH; 15	MOH; 28	MOH; 8	NJMP; 17	NJMP; 19	NJMP; 22	MOH	MOH	20th	63
