= 2023 Porsche Carrera Cup Australia =

Australian motor racing competition

The 2023 Porsche Carrera Cup Australia Championship (Known for commercial reasons as the 2023 Porsche Paynter Dixon Carrera Cup Australia Championship) was the nineteenth running of the Porsche Carrera Cup Australia Championship.

The series would be won by Callum Hedge while the Pro-Am Championship would be won by Adrian Flack.

== Calendar ==
Round	Circuit	Location	Dates
1	(Victoria (state)) Albert Park Circuit	Albert Park, Victoria	30 March–2 April
2	(Northern Territory) Hidden Valley Raceway	Darwin, Northern Territory	17–18 June
3	(Queensland) Reid Park Street Circuit	Townsville, Queensland	8–9 July
4	(South Australia) The Bend Motorsport Park	Tailem Bend, South Australia	19–20 August
5	(Victoria (state)) Sandown Raceway	Springvale, Victoria	17 September
6	(New South Wales) Mount Panorama Circuit	Bathurst, New South Wales	8 October
7	(Queensland) Surfers Paradise Street Circuit	Surfers Paradise, Queensland	28–29 October
8	(South Australia) Adelaide Street Circuit	Adelaide, South Australia	25–26 November

== Teams and Drivers ==
All drivers will be running the Porsche 911 GT3 Cup (992) cars

Team	No.	Driver	Class	Rounds
(Australia) Wall Racing	2	(Australia) Luke King	P	1–4
(Australia) Wall Racing	27	(Australia) Liam Talbot	PA	5–7
(Australia) Wall Racing	38	(Australia) David Wall	P	1–7
(Australia) Wall Racing	86	(Australia) Drew Hall	PA	1, 4–6
(Australia) Porsche Centre Melbourne	3	(New Zealand) Fabian Coulthard	P	2–8
(Australia) Porsche Centre Melbourne	8	(Australia) Nick McBride	P	1
(Australia) Porsche Centre Melbourne	9	(Australia) Marc Cini	PA	1
(Australia) Porsche Centre Melbourne	14	(Australia) Matthew Belford	PA	1
(Australia) Porsche Centre Melbourne	32	(Australia) Courtney Prince	P	All
(Australia) TekworkX Motorsport	5	(Australia) Thomas Maxwell	P	1–7
(Australia) TekworkX Motorsport	23	(Australia) Daniel Stutterd	PA	1–6, 8
(Australia) TekworkX Motorsport	23	(Australia) Luke Youlden	P	7
(Australia) TekworkX Motorsport	72	(Australia) Max Vidau	P	All
(Australia) TekworkX Motorsport	75	(Australia) Kenny Habul	PA	1
(New Zealand) McElrea Racing	7	(New Zealand) Tim Miles	PA	All
(New Zealand) McElrea Racing	11	(Australia) Jackson Walls	P	All
(New Zealand) McElrea Racing	28	(Australia) Bayley Hall	P	All
(New Zealand) McElrea Racing	76	(Australia) Christian Pancione	P	All
(New Zealand) McElrea Racing	101	(Australia) Ryder Quinn	P	1–2, 4–8
(Australia) Melbourne Performance Centre	8	(Australia) Nick McBride	P	2–7
(Australia) Melbourne Performance Centre	9	(Australia) Marc Cini	PA	2–8
(Australia) Melbourne Performance Centre	14	(Australia) Matthew Belford	PA	2–8
(Australia) Jones Motorsport	12	(Australia) Harri Jones	P	6-7
(Australia) Buik Motorsports	13	(Australia) Sam Shahin	PA	All
(New Zealand) Earl Bamber Motorsport	17	(New Zealand) Callum Hedge	P	1–5, 7–8
(New Zealand) Earl Bamber Motorsport	17	(New Zealand) Chris van der Drift	P	6
(New Zealand) Earl Bamber Motorsport	20	(Australia) Adrian Flack	PA	All
(New Zealand) Earl Bamber Motorsport	87	(Australia) Garth Tander	P	4
(New Zealand) Earl Bamber Motorsport	99	(Australia) David Russell	P	1–3, 5–6
(New Zealand) Earl Bamber Motorsport	992	(Australia) Dale Wood	P	All
(Australia) EMA Motorsport	19	(United Kingdom) Harry King	P	6
(Australia) EMA Motorsport	42	(New Zealand) Chris Pither	P	1–4
(Australia) EMA Motorsport	74	(Australia) Garnet Patterson	P	1–2, 5–6
(Australia) RAM Motorsport	22	(Australia) Dean Cook	PA	All
(Australia) RAM Motorsport	35	(South Africa) Indiran Padayachee	PA	1
(Australia) RAM Motorsport	88	(Australia) Dylan O'Keeffe	P	All
(Australia) Sonic Motor Racing Services	77	(Australia) Rodney Jane	PA	1–7
(Australia) Sonic Motor Racing Services	78	(Australia) Marcos Flack	P	7
(Australia) Sonic Motor Racing Services	777	(Australia) Simon Fallon	P	All
(Australia) Sonic Motor Racing Services	999	(Australia) Angelo Mouzouris	P	All
(Australia) Scott Taylor Motorsport	222	(Australia) Alex Davison	P	1–4, 6–8

Icon	Class
P	Pro
PA	Pro-Am

=== Driver Changes ===
- Chris Pither joined EMA Motorsport to replace David Russell who joined Earl Bamber Motorsport.
- Ryder Quinn joined the series, driving for McElrea Racing.
- Courtney Prince graduated from Porsche Sprint Challenge Australia to join Porsche Melbourne.
- Dean Cook left Ashley Seward Motorsport to join RAM Motorsport.
- Luke King joined the series, after competing in the TCR Australia Touring Car Series.

== Results ==
Rd	Circuit	Round Winner	
Rd	Circuit	Class	Driver
1	(Victoria (state)) Albert Park Circuit	P	(Australia) Jackson Walls
1	(Victoria (state)) Albert Park Circuit	PA	(Australia) Adrian Flack
2	(Northern Territory) Hidden Valley Raceway	P	(Australia) Dale Wood
2	(Northern Territory) Hidden Valley Raceway	PA	(Australia) Dean Cook
3	(Queensland) Reid Park Street Circuit	P	(Australia) Alex Davison
3	(Queensland) Reid Park Street Circuit	PA	(Australia) Sam Shahin
4	(South Australia) The Bend Motorsport Park	P	(New Zealand) Callum Hedge
4	(South Australia) The Bend Motorsport Park	PA	(Australia) Sam Shahin
5	(Victoria (state)) Sandown Raceway	P	(New Zealand) Dylan O'Keeffe
5	(Victoria (state)) Sandown Raceway	PA	(Australia) Dean Cook
6	(New South Wales) Mount Panorama Circuit	P	(United Kingdom) Harry King
6	(New South Wales) Mount Panorama Circuit	PA	(Australia) Liam Talbot
7	(Queensland) Surfers Paradise Street Circuit	P	(Australia) Bayley Hall
7	(Queensland) Surfers Paradise Street Circuit	PA	(Australia) Adrian Flack
8	(South Australia) Adelaide Street Circuit	P	(Australia) Dale Wood
8	(South Australia) Adelaide Street Circuit	PA	(Australia) Dean Cook

== Results ==
Round		Circuit	Pole	Fastest lap	Pro Winner	ProAm Winner
1	R1	(Victoria (state)) Albert Park Circuit	(New Zealand) Callum Hedge	Race cancelled due to a lap 2 crash		
1	R2	(Victoria (state)) Albert Park Circuit		(Australia) Max Vidau	(Australia) Max Vidau	(Australia) Adrian Flack
1	R3	(Victoria (state)) Albert Park Circuit		(Australia) Max Vidau	(Australia) Jackson Walls	(Australia) Adrian Flack
2	R1	(Northern Territory) Hidden Valley Raceway	(Australia) Dale Wood	(Australia) Bayley Hall	(Australia) Dale Wood	(Australia) Sam Shahin
2	R2	(Northern Territory) Hidden Valley Raceway		(Australia) Dale Wood	(Australia) Dale Wood	(Australia) Rodney Jane
2	R3	(Northern Territory) Hidden Valley Raceway		(Australia) Dale Wood	(Australia) Dale Wood	(Australia) Adrian Flack
3	R1	(Queensland) Reid Park Street Circuit	(New Zealand) Callum Hedge	(Australia) Thomas Maxwell	(Australia) Max Vidau	(Australia) Adrian Flack
3	R2	(Queensland) Reid Park Street Circuit		(Australia) Alex Davison	(Australia) Max Vidau	(Australia) Adrian Flack
3	R3	(Queensland) Reid Park Street Circuit		(Australia) Thomas Maxwell	(Australia) Alex Davison	(Australia) Sam Shahin
4	R1	(South Australia) The Bend Motorsport Park	(New Zealand) Callum Hedge	(Australia) Jackson Walls	(New Zealand) Callum Hedge	(Australia) Sam Shahin
4	R2	(South Australia) The Bend Motorsport Park		(Australia) Simon Fallon	(New Zealand) Callum Hedge	(Australia) Dean Cook
4	R3	(South Australia) The Bend Motorsport Park		(Australia) Jackson Walls	(New Zealand) Callum Hedge	(Australia) Sam Shahin
5	R1	(Victoria (state)) Sandown Raceway	(Australia) Dylan O'Keeffe	(Australia) Bayley Hall	(Australia) Dylan O'Keeffe	(Australia) Sam Shahin
5	R2	(Victoria (state)) Sandown Raceway		(New Zealand) Callum Hedge	(New Zealand) Callum Hedge	(Australia) Adrian Flack
5	R3	(Victoria (state)) Sandown Raceway		(Australia) Jackson Walls	(Australia) Dylan O'Keeffe	(Australia) Rodney Jane
6	R1	(New South Wales) Mount Panorama Circuit	(Australia) Harri Jones	(Australia) Harri Jones	(United Kingdom) Harry King	(Australia) Liam Talbot
6	R2	(New South Wales) Mount Panorama Circuit		(New Zealand) Chris van der Drift	(United Kingdom) Harry King	(Australia) Liam Talbot
6	R3	(New South Wales) Mount Panorama Circuit		(United Kingdom) Harry King	(United Kingdom) Harry King	(Australia) Liam Talbot
7	R1	(Queensland) Surfers Paradise Street Circuit	(New Zealand) Callum Hedge	(Australia) Jackson Walls	(New Zealand) Callum Hedge	(Australia) Liam Talbot
7	R2	(Queensland) Surfers Paradise Street Circuit		(Australia) Harri Jones	(Australia) Bayley Hall	(Australia) Dean Cook
7	R3	(Queensland) Surfers Paradise Street Circuit		(New Zealand) Callum Hedge	(Australia) Bayley Hall	(Australia) Adrian Flack
8	R1	(South Australia) Adelaide Street Circuit	(New Zealand) Callum Hedge	(Australia) Bayley Hall	(Australia) Dale Wood	(Australia) Dean Cook
8	R2	(South Australia) Adelaide Street Circuit		(New Zealand) Callum Hedge	(Australia) Dale Wood	(Australia) Adrian Flack
8	R3	(South Australia) Adelaide Street Circuit		(Australia) Bayley Hall	(Australia) Dale Wood	(Australia) Sam Shahin

== Championship Standings ==
=== Pro ===
Pos.	Driver	No.	MEL			HID			TOW			BEN			SAN			BAT			SUR			ADE			Pen	Points
1	(New Zealand) Callum Hedge	17	C	3	3	4	2	2	6	3	3	1	1	1	3	1	12				1	10	6	2	2	7	0	935
2	(Australia) Jackson Walls	11	C	2	1	2	3	3	5	4	2	2	2	12	10	Ret	9	6	5	4	6	2	2	3	4	Ret	0	905
3	(Australia) Dale Wood	992	C	5	4	1	1	1	14	14	14	7	8	8	5	4	3	8	20	18	Ret	8	13	1	1	1	10	757
4	(Australia) Dylan O'Keeffe	88	C	16	11	20	8	8	9	7	13	3	6	Ret	1	2	1	4	8	5	2	3	4	9	8	2	0	751
5	(Australia) Max Vidau	72	C	1	2	9	19	17	1	1	5	8	5	3	Ret	7	5	10	6	5	Ret	DNS	DNS	6	3	3	0	664
6	(Australia) Bayley Hall	28	C	8	8	18	13	14	Ret	8	12	6	7	6	2	3	2	Ret	14	11	5	1	1	11	10	4	0	649
7	(New Zealand) Fabian Coulthard	3				8	6	7	4	6	4	12	18	10	6	6	14	5	18	12	12	5	3	10	7	5	10	559
8	(Australia) Alex Davison	222	C	9	9	13	11	11	2	2	1	19	16	Ret				17	13	14	7	12	7	4	5	10	0	493
9	(Australia) Simon Fallon	777	C	DNS	DNS	11	7	5	Ret	9	16	5	3	2	8	8	4	12	10	7	11	6	DNS	DNS	DNS	DNS	25	438
10	(Australia) Christian Pancione	76	C	10	16	15	12	12	8	Ret	Ret	4	4	4	9	Ret	Ret	14	12	13	8	7	5	7	15	Ret	10	424
11	(Australia) Angelo Mouzouris	999	C	7	7	14	14	13	10	15	11	13	17	7	16	9	Ret	11	19	20	Ret	13	10	8	9	6	0	410
12	(Australia) David Wall	38	C	12	13	5	5	10	3	5	7	14	12	Ret	7	Ret	11	Ret	15	16	3	16	Ret				15	375
13	(Australia) Nick McBride	8	C	4	6	6	16	19	11	10	10	9	10	11	12	Ret	Ret	11	19	20	9	14	12				0	343
14	(Australia) Thomas Maxwell	5	C	Ret	14	3	4	4	12	Ret	8	17	15	9	11	10	7	15	16	18	Ret	DNS	DNS				0	329
15	(Australia) David Russell	99	C	6	5	12	10	6	Ret	DNS	DNS				4	5	8	7	4	15							0	323
16	(Australia) Ryder Quinn	101	C	17	12	17	Ret	DNS				16	14	Ret	13	12	10	16	9	10	Ret	9	8	5	6	Ret	0	277
17	(Australia) Courtney Prince	32	C	15	18	19	17	18	15	13	15	18	19	13	14	13	13	18	17	19	10	Ret	14	15	11	8	0	267
18	(Australia) Garnet Patterson	74	C	11	10	7	9	9							15	11	6	9	7	8							0	232
19	(Australia) Harri Jones	12																2	2	2	Ret	4	DNS				0	205
20	(United Kingdom) Harry King	19																1	1	1							0	180
21	(New Zealand) Chris Pither	42	C	13	15	10	18	15	7	12	6	15	11	Ret													0	170
22	(Australia) Luke King	2	C	14	17	16	15	16	13	11	9	11	13	14													0	153
23	(New Zealand) Chris van der Drift	17																3	3	3							0	144
24	(Australia) Garth Tander	87										10	9	5													0	85
25	(Australia) Luke Youlden	23																			4	15	9				0	76
26	(Australia) Marcos Flack	78																			13	11	11				0	50

=== Pro-Am ===
Pos.	Driver	No.	MEL			HID			TOW			BEN			SAN			BAT			SUR			ADE			Pen	Points
1	(Australia) Adrian Flack	20	C	1	1	3	7	1	1	1	Ret	2	5	2	8	1	Ret	2	2	2	2	2	1	2	1	4	0	1104
2	(Australia) Dean Cook	22	C	4	5	2	3	3	7	3	5	3	1	4	2	2	3	7	3	6	3	1	2	1	2	2	0	1074
3	(Australia) Sam Shahin	13	C	5	3	1	4	4	2	2	1	1	2	1	1	3	Ret	3	5	5	4	Ret	3	3	3	1	0	1052
4	(Australia) Matthew Belford	14	C	3	4	4	Ret	6	4	5	2	5	4	8	4	Ret	5	4	4	3	Ret	Ret	DNS	6	7	5	0	678
5	(Australia) Marc Cini	9	C	6	7	8	6	8	8	7	4	9	9	9	7	7	8	9	8	Ret	7	4	4	7	6	7	0	647
6	(Australia) Rodney Jane	77	C	2	2	7	1	7	3	4	6	4	3	5	9	5	1	Ret	Ret	DNS	5	Ret	DNS				0	629
7	(New Zealand) Tim Miles	7	C	8	Ret	6	2	2	6	Ret	Ret	6	7	6	5	8	4	6	Ret	7	6	Ret	5	4	4	6	15	625
8	(Australia) Daniel Stutterd	23	C	DNS	DNS	5	5	5	5	6	3	8	6	3	Ret	Ret	6	5	6	4				5	5	3	0	592
9	(Australia) Liam Talbot	27													3	4	2	1	1	1	1	3	DNS				0	433
10	(Australia) Drew Hall	86	C	7	6							7	8	7	6	6	7	8	7	8							0	319
11	(South Africa) Indiran Padayachee	35	C	DNS	DNS																						0	0
12	(Australia) Kenny Habul	75	C	DNS	DNS																						0	0
