= Callum Hedge =

New Zealand racing driver (born 2003)

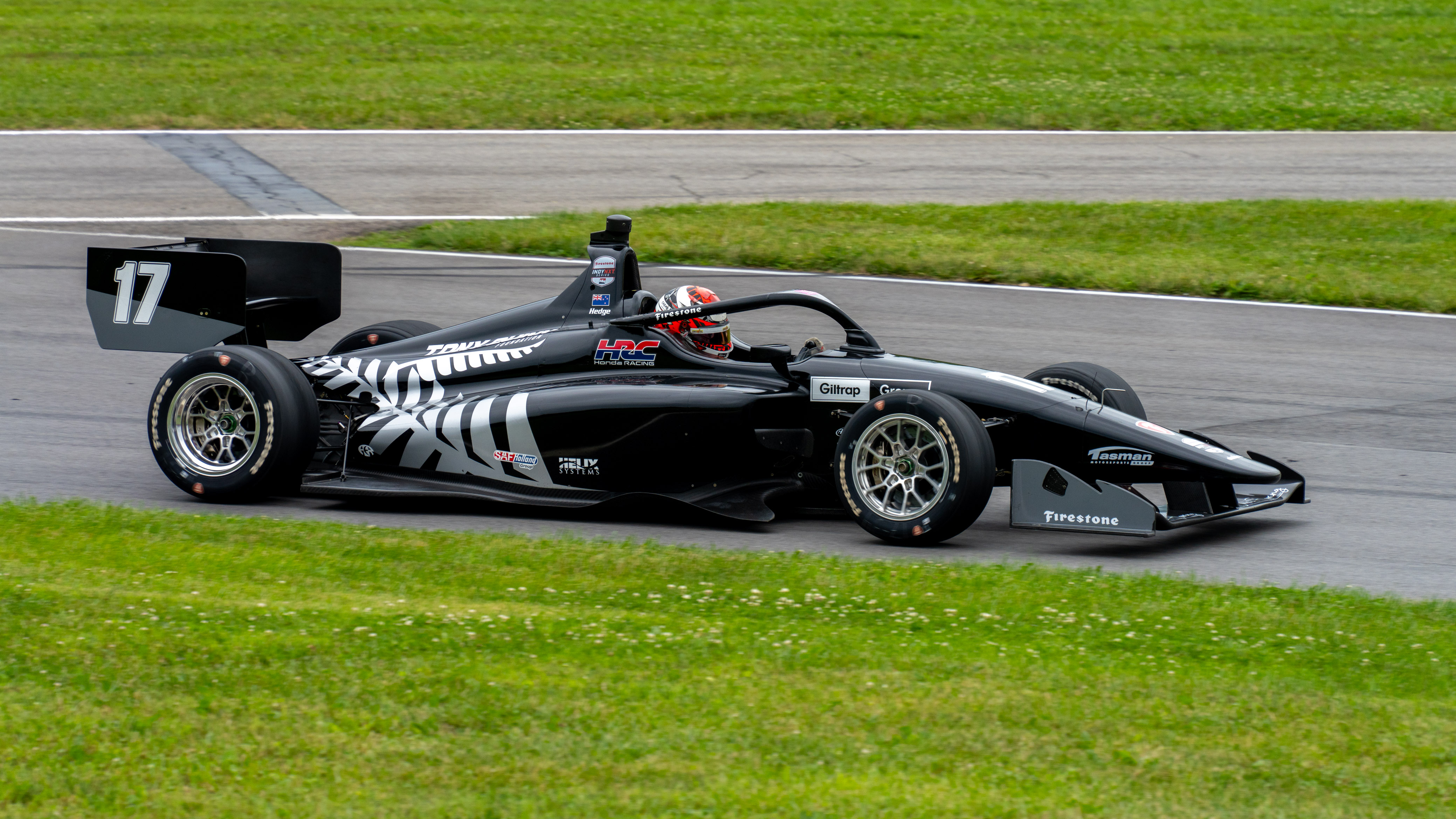
- Hedge at Mid-Ohio in 2024
- Nationality: (New Zealand) New Zealander
- Born: Callum Rennie Allan Hedge; 17 November 2003 (age 22) Auckland, New Zealand

Porsche Carrera Cup North America career
- Debut season: 2026
- Current team: JDX Racing
- Categorisation: FIA Silver
- Car number: 9
- Starts: 7 (8 entries)
- Championships: 0
- Wins: 0
- Podiums: 5
- Poles: 0
- Fastest laps: 0
- Best finish: TBC in 2026

Previous series
- 2024–2025 2021 2018–19 2017–19 2016–19 2017–18: Indy NXT; Porsche Sprint Challenge Australia; Australian Formula Ford; Toyota Finance 86 Championship; SsangYong Racing Series; NZ Formula 1600 Championship

Championship titles
- 2023 2023 2018–19 2017–18: Formula Regional Americas Championship; Porsche Carrera Cup Australia; Toyota Finance 86 Championship; NZ Formula 1600 Championship

Callum Rennie Allan Hedge (born 17 November 2003) is a New Zealand racing driver who is currently competing in the Porsche Carrera Cup North America for JDX Racing. He is known for his Indy NXT stint in 2024 and 2025.

A multiple-time national karting champion, Hedge won the 2017–18 NZ Formula 1600 Championship and the 2018–19 Toyota Finance 86 Championship before switching to sports car racing with Porsche in 2020. He won the 2023 Formula Regional Americas Championship for Crosslink Kiwi Motorsports. In the same year, he also won the Porsche Carrera Cup Australia championship. Hedge attended St Kentigern College in Pakuranga, Auckland.

== Career ==
=== Formula Regional ===
In 2023, Hedge took part in the Formula Regional Oceania Championship, competing for M2 Competition. Throughout the entire season, Hedge was embroiled in the title fight with teammate Charlie Wurz, with the two trading the championship lead often as the season progressed. He won the opening race of the season at Highlands, but fell behind Wurz after finishing thirteenth in the feature race. Despite finishing second, first, and second in the three races at Teretonga, Wurz's pair of victories kept Hedge behind in the championship. Hedge closed the gap during the Manfeild and Hampton Downs rounds, and just six points separated the two entering the final weekend at Taupo. Hedge scored a victory in the opening race of the final weekend, but fell behind in the final two races to finish second in the championship.

==== Formula Regional Americas ====
After the Oceania championship concluded, Hedge traveled to the United States to take part in the 2023 Formula Regional Americas Championship with Crosslink Kiwi Motorsports.

=== Indy NXT ===
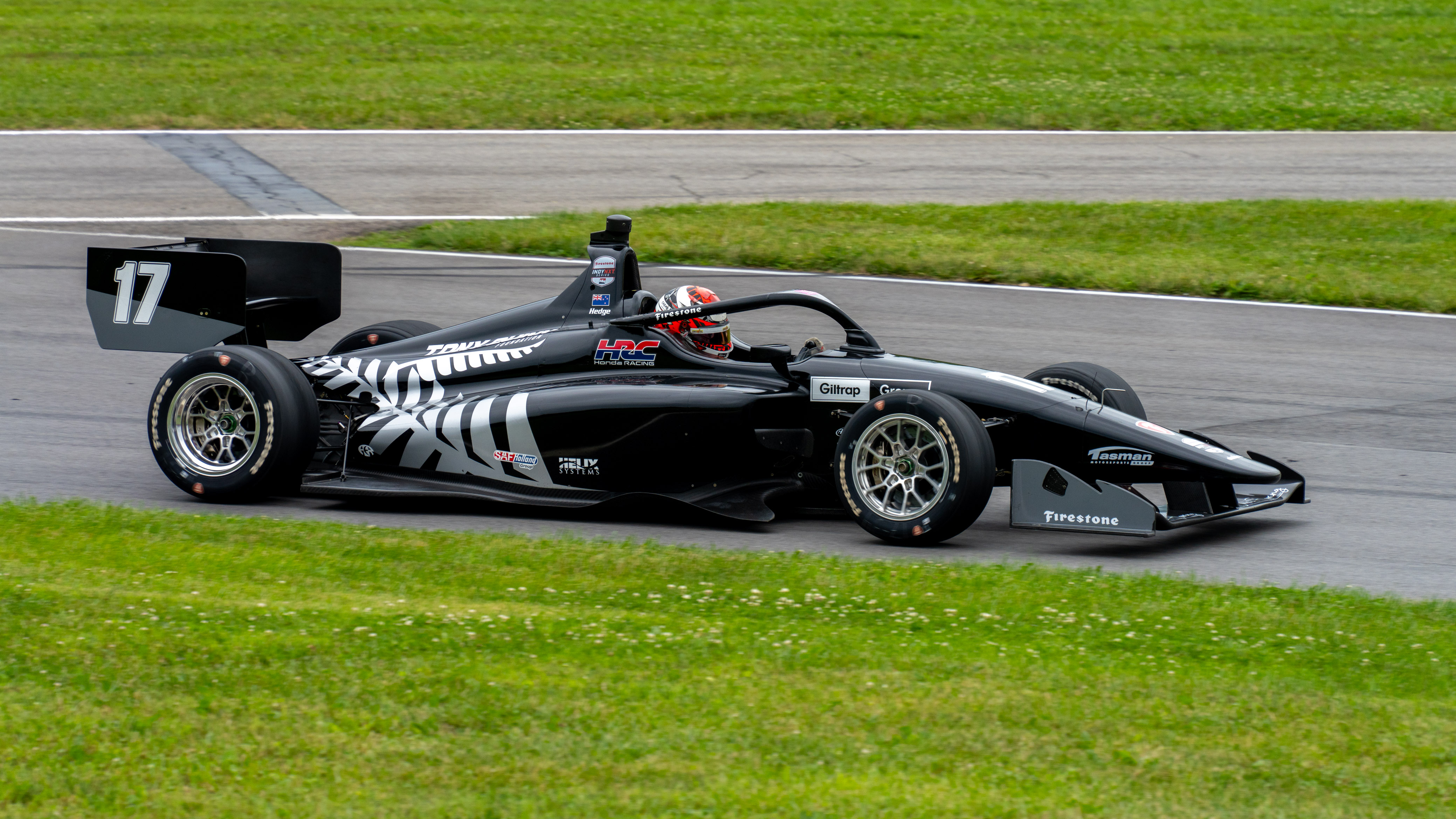
Hedge in his 2024 Indy NXT car at Mid-Ohio

==== 2024 ====
For 2024, HMD Motorsports signed Hedge to compete in the Indy NXT.

==== 2025 ====
Hedge remained in Indy NXT for 2025, but switched to Abel Motorsports for his sophomore season.

== Racing record ==
=== Racing career summary ===
Season	Series	Team	Races	Wins	Poles	F/Laps	Podiums	Points	Position
2016–17	SsangYong Racing Series	N/A	22	1	0	0	1	1267	15th
2017–18	NZ Formula 1600 Championship	N/A	17	11	4	14	15	603	**1st**
2017–18	Formula Ford New Zealand South Island Series	N/A	?	?	?	?	?	324	7th
2017–18	SsangYong Racing Series	N/A	17	0	0	3	6	?	?
2017–18	Toyota Finance 86 Championship	N/A	3	0	0	0	0	75	22nd
2018	Australian Formula Ford Series	N/A	6	0	0	0	0	38	17th
2018	New South Wales Formula Ford Championship	N/A	3	0	0	0	0	35	17th
2018–19	Toyota Finance 86 Championship	CareVets Racing Team	18	7	3	5	12	1138	**1st**
2018–19	SsangYong Racing Series	N/A	4	3	1	4	4	?	?
2019	Australian Formula Ford Series	Sonic Motor Racing Services	21	3	2	1	10	230	4th
2019	New South Wales Formula Ford Championship	Sonic Motor Racing Services	6	1	1	0	4	131	8th
2019	Victorian Formula Ford Championship	Sonic Motor Racing Services	6	0	0	0	1	78	17th
2020	South Island Porsche Racing Series	N/A	6	5	2	5	5	?	?
2020	Speed Works Rush Hour	N/A	1	0	0	0	0	?	?
2021	Porsche Sprint Challenge Australia	Earl Bamber Motorsport	5	1	0	0	4	240	**3rd**
2021	Porsche Carrera Cup Australia - Pro	Earl Bamber Motorsport	4	0	0	0	0	0	NC†
2021	Formula Regional European Championship	G4 Racing	2	0	0	0	0	0	NC†
2022	Porsche Carrera Cup Australia - Pro	Earl Bamber Motorsport	24	2	1	2	7	570	6th
2023	Formula Regional Oceania Championship	M2 Competition	15	3	4	3	9	329	**2nd**
2023	Formula Regional Americas Championship	Crosslink Kiwi Motorsports	18	13	5	10	16	384	**1st**
2023	Porsche Carrera Cup Australia - Pro	Team Porsche New Zealand /EBM	20	4	5	3	14	932	**1st**
2024	Indy NXT	HMD Motorsports	14	0	0	0	1	332	4th
2024	Formula Regional Oceania Championship	mtec Motorsport	3	0	0	0	2	74	18th
2025	Indy NXT	Abel Motorsports	14	0	0	0	1	358	7th
2026	Porsche Carrera Cup North America	JDX Racing	16	1	3	3	9	226	4th

^{†} As Hedge was a guest driver, he was ineligible to score points.
* Season still in progress.

=== Complete Formula Regional European Championship results ===
(key) (Races in bold indicate pole position) (Races in italics indicate fastest lap)

Year	Team	1	2	3	4	5	6	7	8	9	10	11	12	13	14	15	16	17	18	19	20	DC	Points
2021	G4 Racing	IMO; 1	IMO; 2	CAT; 1	CAT; 2	MCO; 1	MCO; 2	LEC; 1	LEC; 2	ZAN; 1	ZAN; 2	SPA; 1	SPA; 2	RBR; 1	RBR; 2	VAL; 1	VAL; 2	MUG; 1	MUG; 2	MNZ; 1; 22	MNZ; 2; 20	NC†	0

^{†} As Hedge was a guest driver, he was ineligible to score points.

=== Complete Formula Regional Oceania Championship results ===
(key) (Races in bold indicate pole position) (Races in italics indicate fastest lap)

Year	Team	1	2	3	4	5	6	7	8	9	10	11	12	13	14	15	DC	Points
2023	M2 Competition	**HIG**; **1**; 1	HIG; 2; 6	**HIG**; **3**; 13	**TER**; **1**; 2	TER; 2; 1	TER; 3; 2	MAN; 1; 2	MAN; 2; 7	MAN; 3; 2	HMP; 1; 3	HMP; 2; 18	HMP; 3; 3	**TAU**; **1**; 1	TAU; 2; 6	TAU; 3; 4	2nd	329
2024	Giles Motorsport	TAU; 1	TAU; 2	TAU; 3	MAN; 1	MAN; 2	MAN; 3	HMP; 1	HMP; 2	HMP; 3	RUA; 1	RUA; 2	RUA; 3	HIG; 1; 2	HIG; 2; 5	HIG; 3; 2	18th	74

=== Complete New Zealand Grand Prix results ===
Year	Team	Car	Qualifying	Main race
2023	(New Zealand) M2 Competition	Tatuus FT-60 - Toyota	4th	**3rd**
2024	(New Zealand) mtec Motorsport	Tatuus FT-60 - Toyota	**2nd**	**2nd**

=== Complete Formula Regional Americas Championship results ===
(key) (Races in bold indicate pole position) (Races in italics indicate fastest lap)

Year	Team	1	2	3	4	5	6	7	8	9	10	11	12	13	14	15	16	17	18	DC	Points
2023	Crosslink Kiwi Motorsports	NOL; 1; 6	NOL; 2; 3	NOL; 3; 1	**ROA**; **1**; 1	ROA; 2; 1	ROA; 3; 1	**MOH**; **1**; 1	MOH; 2; 1	MOH; 3; 1	**NJM**; **1**; 2	NJM; 2; 1	NJM; 3; 1	VIR; 1; 1	VIR; 2; 1	VIR; 3 Ret	COT; 1; 1	COT; 2; 2	COT; 3; 1	1st	384

==== Indy NXT ====
(key) (Races in bold indicate pole position) (Races in italics indicate fastest lap) (Races with ^{L} indicate a race lap led) (Races with * indicate most race laps led)

Year	Team	1	2	3	4	5	6	7	8	9	10	11	12	13	14	Rank	Points
2024	HMD Motorsports	STP; 11	BAR; 9	IMS; 4	IMS; 10	DET; 3	RDA; 6	LAG; 12	LAG; 16	MOH; 4	IOW; 4	GMP; 5	POR; 13	MIL; 11	NSH; 16	4th	332
2025	Abel Motorsports	STP; 8	BAR; 18	IMS; 4	IMS; 10	DET; 11	GMP; 7	RDA; 6	MOH; 6	IOW; 6	LAG; 5	LAG; 3	POR; 4	MIL; 4	NSH; 18	7th	358

* Season still in progress.
