= Charlie Wurz =

Austrian and British racing driver (born 2005)

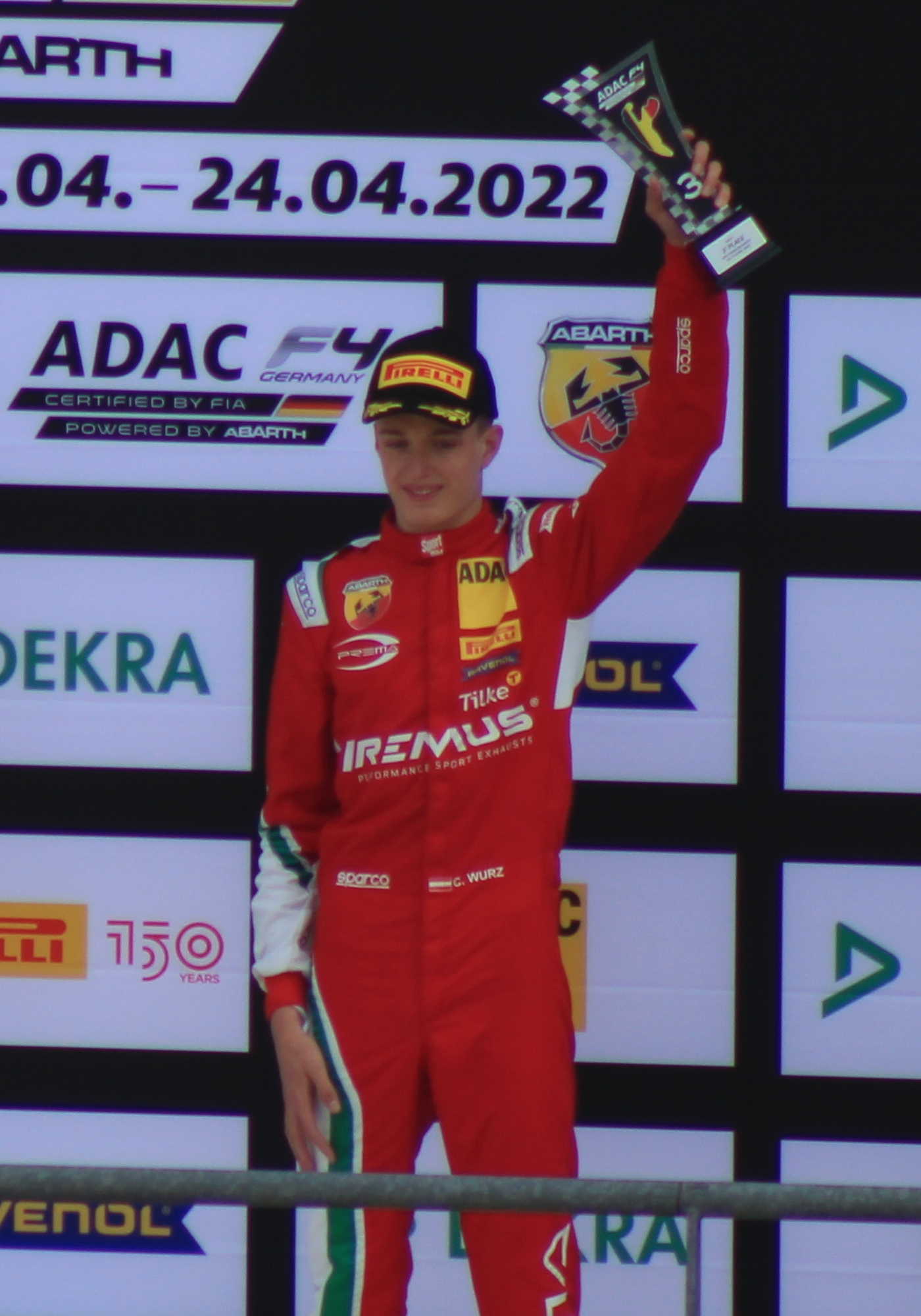
- Wurz in 2022
- Nationality: (Austria) Austrian; (United Kingdom) British
- Born: 2 December 2005 (age 20) Monte Carlo, Monaco
- Relatives: Alexander Wurz (father); Oscar Wurz (brother)

Super Formula Championship career
- Debut season: 2026
- Current team: Team Goh
- Categorisation: FIA Silver
- Car number: 53
- Starts: 10
- Wins: 0
- Podiums: 0
- Poles: 0
- Fastest laps: 0

Previous series
- 2024–2025 2023 2023 2023 2022 2022 2021–22 2021-2022 2021: FIA Formula 3 Euroformula Open; FR European; FR Oceania; ADAC Formula 4 F4 UAE; Porsche Sprint Challenge ME; Italian F4; Porsche Sprint Challenge CE

Championship titles
- 2022 2023: F4 UAE; FR Oceania

Charlie Wurz (born 2 December 2005) is an Austrian and British racing driver who currently competes in the Super Formula Championship with Team Goh.

Wurz is the son of former Formula One driver Alexander Wurz and older brother of Oscar. He is the 2022 Formula 4 UAE and the 2023 Formula Regional Oceania champion. Wurz debuted in FIA Formula 3 for Jenzer Motorsport in 2024 before moving to Trident in 2025.

== Single-seater career ==
=== Karting ===
Wurz competed in karting series across Europe since 2017. These included the Rotax Max Challenge, WSK events and FIA sanctioned karting series. During this time, Wurz was scouted to join the Ferrari Driver Academy.

=== Lower formulae ===
==== 2021 ====
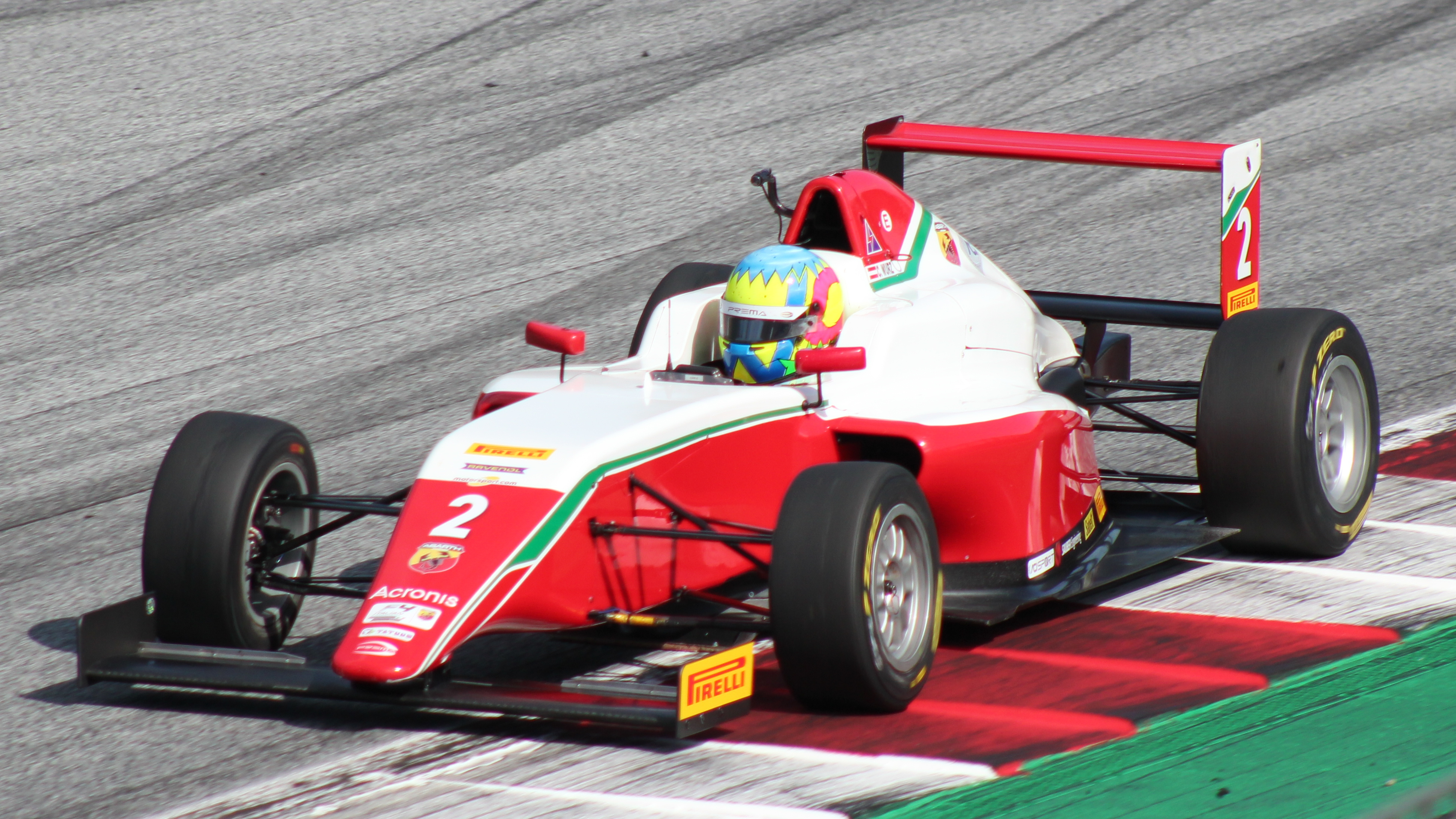
Wurz driving at the Red Bull Ring during the 2021 Italian F4 Championship.

Wurz made his single-seater debut in 2021, competing at the Vallelunga round of the Italian F4 Championship as part of the Prema outfit and taking a win in the rookie class during Race 3. He would go on to compete in his home round at the Red Bull Ring, scoring points that elevated him to 20th in the standings. At the end of the year, Wurz took his first win in the category, taking victory at the F4 UAE Trophy Round held in support of the 2021 Abu Dhabi Grand Prix.

==== 2022 ====
At the beginning of 2022, Wurz competed in the F4 UAE Championship on a full-time basis in preparation for his European season. During the campaign, Wurz took a podium during the first round in Yas Marina, before following it up with a double podium for the first Dubai round. He proceeded to take a win each during the next two rounds in Dubai, moving him to the championship lead. A further second place podium in the final round allowed Wurz to clinch the title with a race to spare, having secured two wins, eight podiums throughout the season.

For his main season, Wurz would remain with Prema for the entirety of the Italian F4 Championship, as well as taking part in the first half of the ADAC F4 series. In the latter, a third place at Spa-Francorchamps and a further pair of podiums at Zandvoort meant that the Austrian driver placed seventh in the standings, although his campaign in the former would bear more fruit. After a pair of points finishes at Imola, Wurz would take his first podium at Misano, having fought for victory with teammate Andrea Kimi Antonelli. More points came at Spa, before Wurz tasted champagne at Vallelunga, scoring a pair of third places. At the penultimate round in Monza, Wurz would take pole for Race 1, which he managed to convert into his first victory in the series, whilst also scoring a podium in Race 2 during a weekend that the Austrian described as having been "fantastic". One more podium came during the season finale at Mugello, with Wurz finishing the season fourth in the standings.

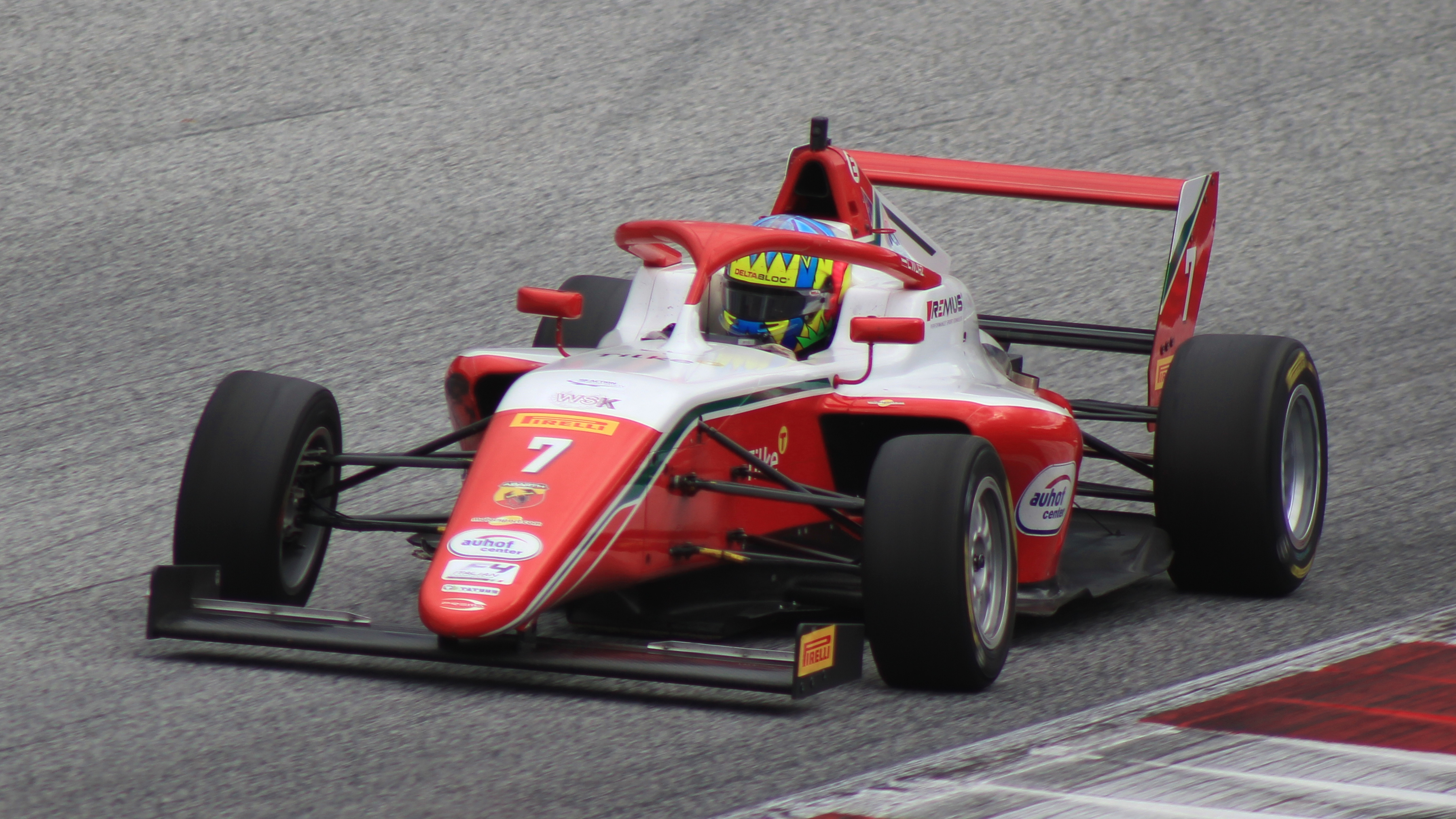
Wurz driving at the Red Bull Ring during the 2022 Italian F4 Championship.

Wurz also made a cameo appearance in Spanish F4 at Campos Racing in Jerez, substituting in for an injured Jesse Carrasquedo Jr. He took a third-placed podium in just his first race, with the Austrian finishing seventh and sixth in the other two races. He also competed in the FIA Motorsport Games Formula 4 Cup for Team Austria, where he finished the main race in 11th place.

=== Formula Regional ===
==== Formula Regional Oceania Championship ====
At the start of 2023, Wurz took part in the Formula Regional Oceania Championship in New Zealand, driving for M2 Competition. He started the season in a strong manner, taking the championship lead during the first round with a pair of second-placed finishes in the main races. At the next event in Teretonga, the Austrian would extend his advantage at the top of the standings, winning races 1 and 3. After a lull at Manfeild, where Wurz finished no higher than fifth, he returned to the top step of the podium in the reverse grid race at Hampton Downs. As championship adversary Callum Hedge suffered from mechanical difficulties during the race, Wurz once again moved to the top of the standings. He won the feature race at Taupo while Hedge finished fourth, securing the series championship.

==== Formula Regional European Championship ====
Wurz confirmed in January that he would be competing in the Formula Regional European Championship during the 2023 season, driving for ART Grand Prix alongside Laurens van Hoepen and Marcus Amand. He scored a point during the opening round in Imola, and had a difficult first few rounds before he was forced to miss the Spa-Francorchamps round after contracting laryngitis. He only raced in two more rounds of the championship following that before switching to Euroformula Open, therefore ending 26th in the standings with one point.

=== Euroformula Open ===
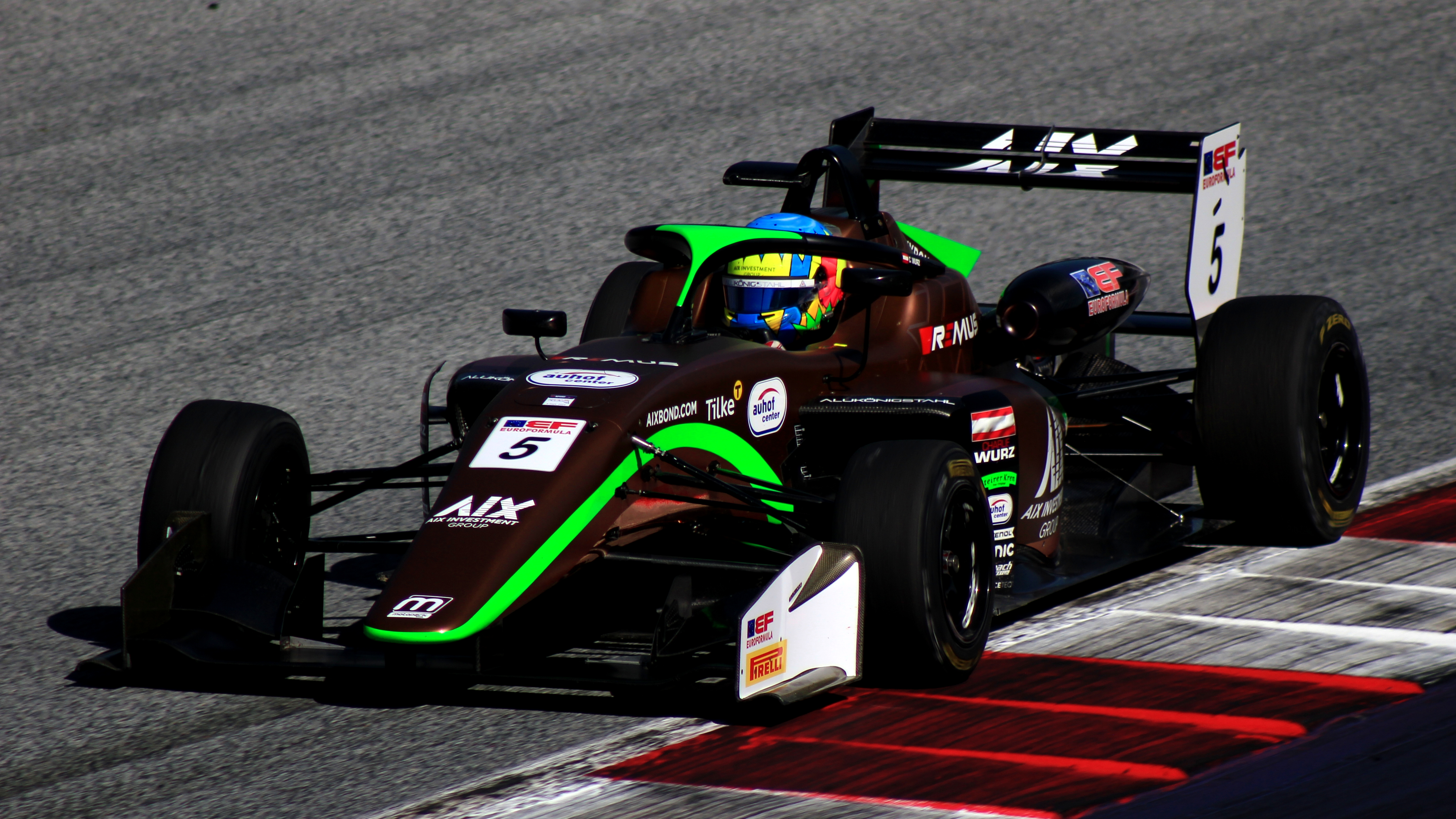
Wurz driving at the Red Bull Ring during the 2023 Euroformula Open Championship.

In 2023, Wurz made his Euroformula Open debut for the fifth round at the Red Bull Ring with CryptoTower Racing Team. He began his campaign with a podium at the Red Bull Ring, before securing his first and only win of the year during a dramatic second race in Monza. He concluded his campaign with a double rostrum during the Barcelona season finale, finishing sixth in the standings with one win, five podiums and 139 points.

=== Macau Grand Prix ===
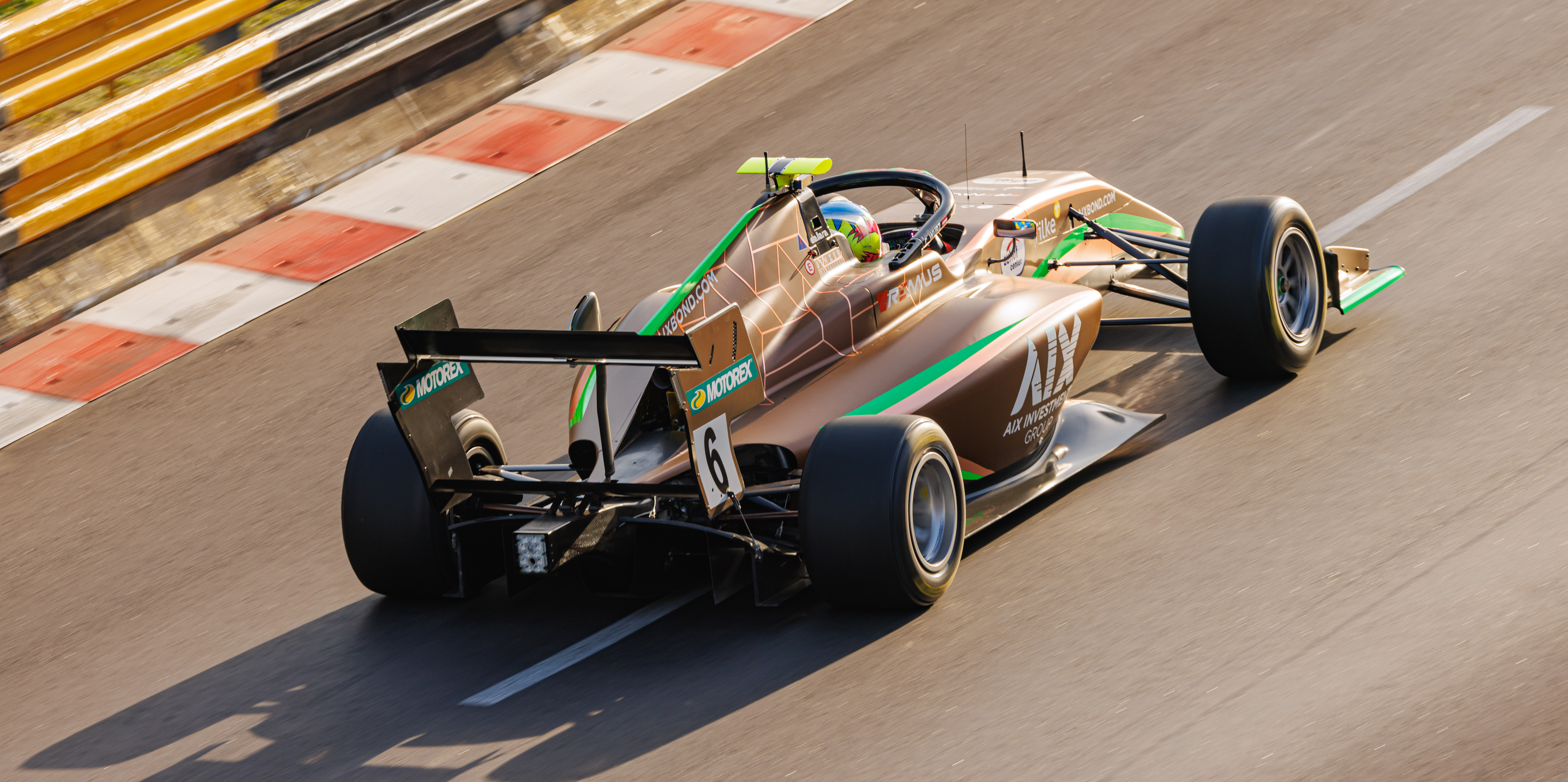
Wurz at the 2023 Macau Grand Prix

In 2023, Wurz participated in the final edition of the FIA Formula 3 World Cup at Macau with Jenzer Motorsport. He would qualify 18th for the qualification race and finished in 11th, However, he failed to finish the main race.

=== FIA Formula 3 Championship ===
==== 2024 ====
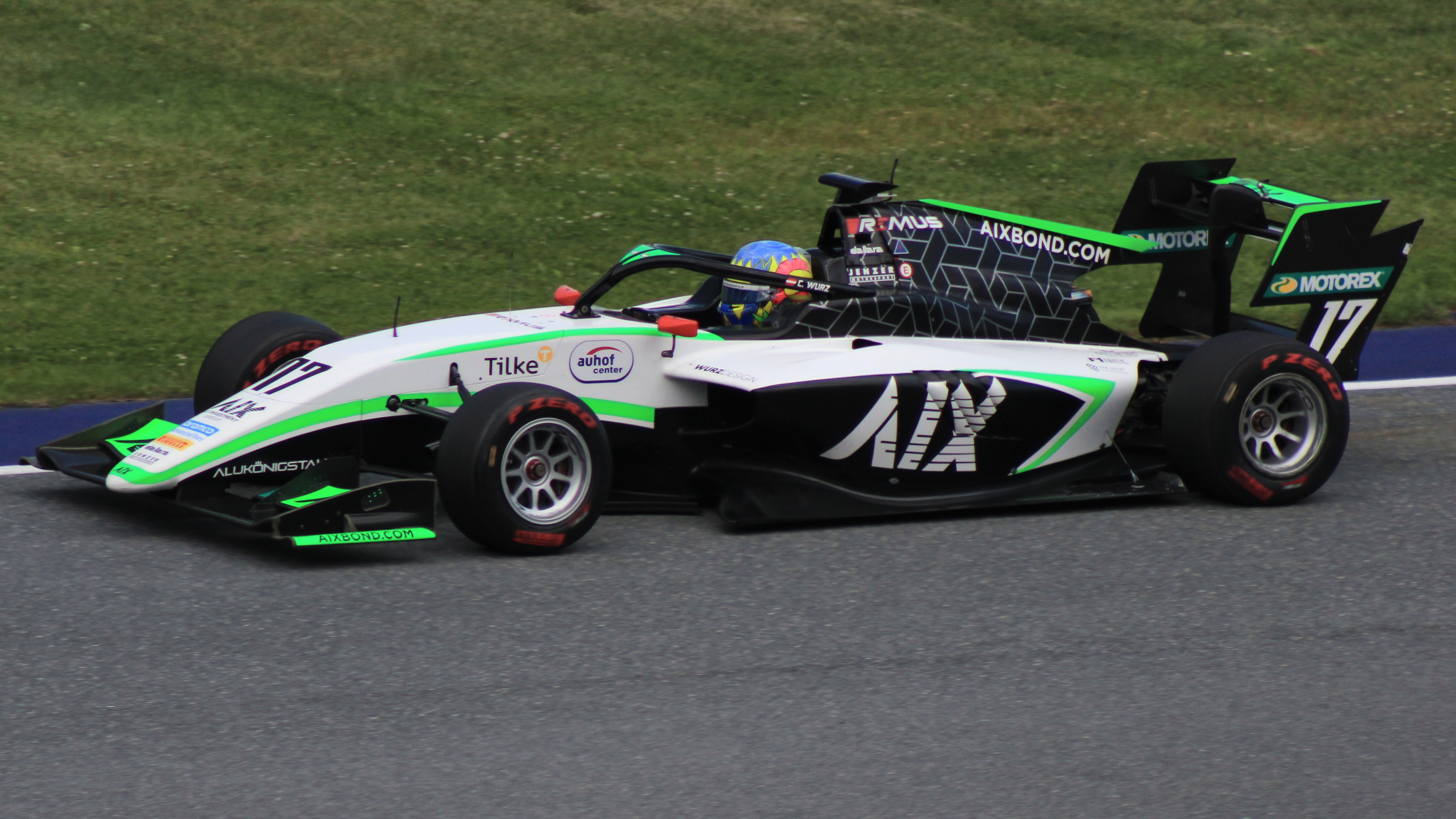
Wurz driving the Dallara F3 2019 during the 2024 Spielberg Formula 3 round

In October 2023, Wurz joined Jenzer Motorsport for FIA Formula 3 post-season testing at Jerez. Wurz was later confirmed to be joining the Swiss outfit for the 2024 FIA F3 season, alongside Max Esterson and Matías Zagazeta. Wurz only finished in the points once which took place during the Melbourne feature race, where excellent tyre management brought him up to fifth place after starting 14th. He qualified sixth and was fighting for another top-five finish in the Silverstone sprint race, but he was involved in a race-ending collision with Alex Dunne on the Wellington Straight. Wurz finished 22nd in the drivers' standings, ahead of Zagazeta but behind Esterson.

==== 2025 ====
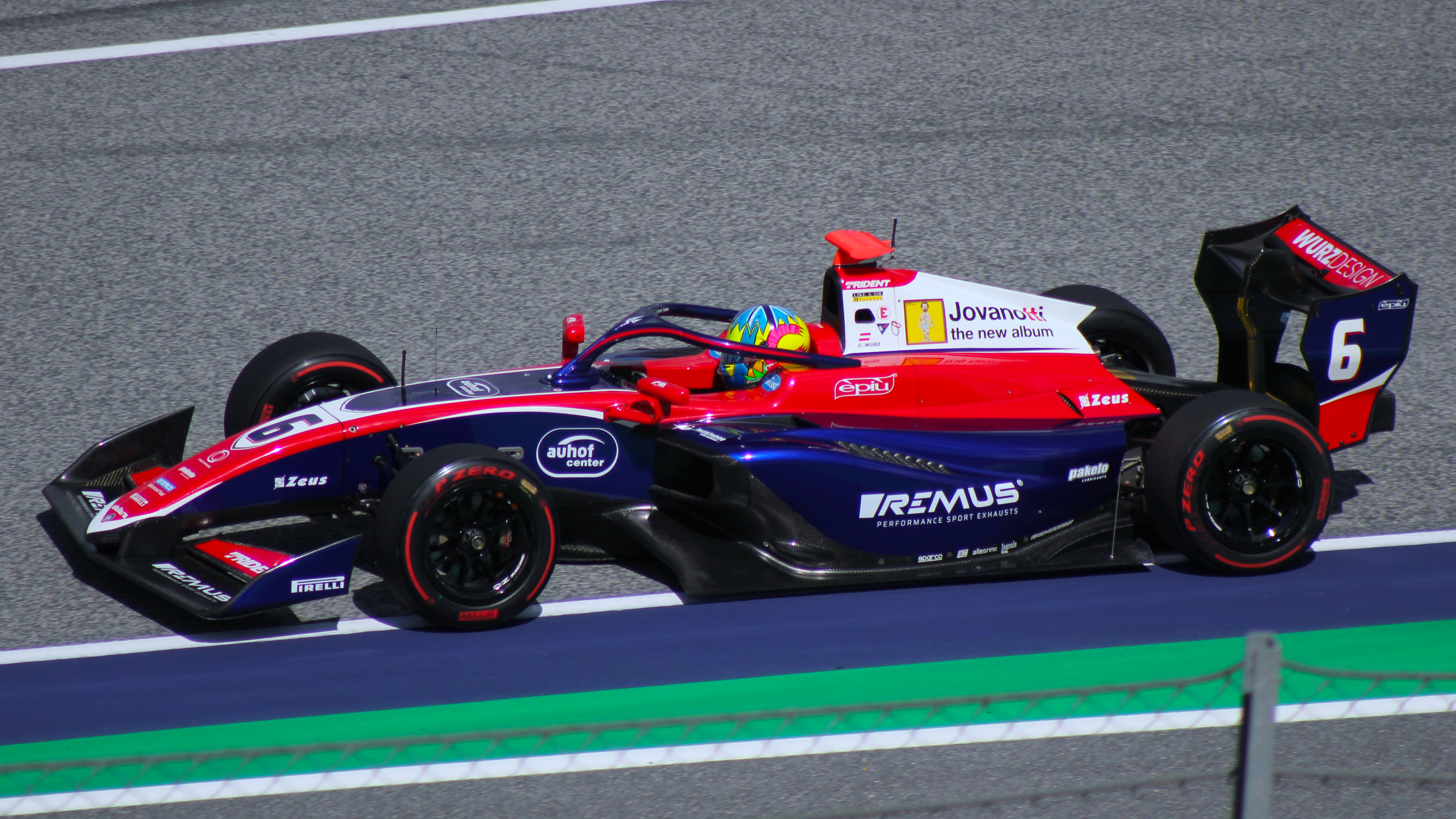
Wurz driving the Dallara F3 2025 during the 2025 Spielberg Formula 3 round

Remaining in Formula 3 for a second campaign, Wurz switched to Trident for the 2025 season, partnering reigning FRECA champion Rafael Câmara and rookie champion Noah Strømsted.

=== Super Formula ===
Wurz left Europe to compete in Super Formula with the new revived Team Goh.

== Sportscar racing ==
=== Porsche Sprint Challenge ===
In 2021, Wurz competed in two races of the Porsche Sprint Challenge Europe at the Hungaroring. He won one race, having secured a pole position and fastest lap in the same event. In the following race, Wurz finished on the podium in third position.

Wurz returned to the Porsche Sprint Challenge at the end of the year, this time racing in the Middle East. He managed to win three races, which placed him sixth in the GT4 standings despite missing the majority of the season.

=== Porsche Carrera Cup ===
In 2023, Wurz competed in the second round of the 2023-24 Porsche Carrera Cup Middle East at Bahrain International Circuit. He finished sixth overall in both races.

=== Super GT ===
Wurz also made his series debut in Super GT in 2026, where he raced in Super GT's GT300 with apr Lexus car as the third driver, alongside Kazuto Kotaka and Miki Koyama.

=== Asian Le Mans Series ===
Wurz is scheduled to make his prototype racing debut in the 2026–27 Asian Le Mans Series, racing for Algarve Pro Racing alongside Theodor Jensen and Jens Reno Møller.

== Personal life ==
Wurz's father is double Le Mans 24h winner and former Formula 1 driver Alexander Wurz. Wurz resides in Monte Carlo, but competes under the Austrian flag.

== Karting record ==
=== Karting career summary ===
Season	Series	Team	Position
2017	BNL Golden Trophy — Junior Max		26th
2018	FIA Central European Zone — R Mini	Wurz Racing	11th
2018	Rotax Max Challenge Grand Finals — Mini MAX	Wurz Racing	10th
2019	FIA Central European Zone — R Junior	VPDR	3rd
2019	Austrian Karting Championship — Rotax Max Junior	VPDR	2nd
2019	Rotax Max Challenge Euro Trophy — Junior Max	VPDR	13th
2019	Rotax Max Challenge International Trophy — Junior Max	Wurz, Alexander	NC
2019	WSK Champions Cup — OKJ	Wurz, Alexander	33rd
2019	FIA Karting Academy Trophy		13th
2019	South Garda Winter Cup — OKJ	Manetti Motorsport	NC
2019	WSK Super Master Series — OKJ	Manetti Motorsport	NC
2019	WSK Euro Series — OKJ	Manetti Motorsport	52nd
2019	WSK Open Cup — OKJ	KR Motorsport	27th
2019	WSK Final Cup — OKJ	KR Motorsport	15th
2019	Rotax Max Challenge Grand Finals — Junior	KMS Europe	11th
2019	FIA Motorsport Games Karting Slalom Cup	Team Austria	8th
2020	South Garda Winter Cup — OK	Exprit Racing Team	NC
2020	WSK Super Master Series — OK	Exprit Racing Team	33rd
2020	WSK Euro Series — OK	Exprit Racing Team	9th
2020	WSK Open Cup — OK	Exprit Racing Team	9th
2020	CIK-FIA European Championship — OK	Exprit Racing Team	38th
2020	CIK-FIA World Championship — OK	Exprit Racing Team	32nd
2021	WSK Super Master Series — OK		51st

== Racing record ==
=== Racing career summary ===
Season	Series	Team	Races	Wins	Poles	F/Laps	Podiums	Points	Position
2021	Italian F4 Championship	Prema Powerteam	6	0	0	0	0	20	20th
2021	Porsche Sprint Challenge Central Europe - GT4	Deltabloc GT Racing	2	1	1	1	2	0	NC†
2021	Formula 4 UAE Championship - Trophy Round	Abu Dhabi Racing by Prema	1	1	0	1	1	—N/a	**1st**
2021–22	Porsche Sprint Challenge Middle East - GT4	BWT Junior Racing	4	3	?	2	3	77.5	6th
2022	Formula 4 UAE Championship	Prema Racing	20	2	3	2	10	255	**1st**
2022	ADAC Formula 4 Championship	Prema Racing	12	0	0	0	3	111	7th
2022	Italian F4 Championship	Prema Racing	20	1	1	0	6	198	4th
2022	F4 Spanish Championship	Campos Racing	3	0	0	0	1	25	15th
2022	FIA Motorsport Games Formula 4 Cup	Team Austria	1	0	0	0	0	N/A	11th
2023	Formula Regional Oceania Championship	M2 Competition	15	4	4	1	7	343	**1st**
2023	Formula Regional European Championship	ART Grand Prix	10	0	0	0	0	1	26th
2023	Euroformula Open Championship	CryptoTower Racing Team	11	1	1	3	5	139	6th
2023	Macau Grand Prix	Jenzer Motorsport	1	0	0	0	0	—N/a	DNF
2023–24	Porsche Carrera Cup Middle East	Central Europe Racing	2	0	0	0	0	20	17th
2024	FIA Formula 3 Championship	Jenzer Motorsport	20	0	0	0	0	10	22nd
2025	FIA Formula 3 Championship	Trident	19	0	0	0	2	53	13th
2025	Macau Grand Prix	Evans GP	1	0	0	0	0	—N/a	18th
2026	Super Formula	Team Goh	10	0	0	0	0	9	16th*
2026	Super GT - GT300	apr	2	0	0	0	1	16	31st
2026–27	Asian Le Mans Series - LMP2	Algarve Pro Racing							

^{†} As Wurz was a guest driver, he was ineligible to score points.
* Season still in progress.

=== Complete Italian F4 Championship results ===
(key) (Races in bold indicate pole position) (Races in italics indicate fastest lap)

Year	Team	1	2	3	4	5	6	7	8	9	10	11	12	13	14	15	16	17	18	19	20	21	22	DC	Points
2021	Prema Powerteam	LEC; 1	LEC; 2	LEC; 3	MIS; 1	MIS; 2	MIS; 3	VLL; 1; 19	VLL; 2; 12	VLL; 3; 4	IMO; 1	IMO; 2	IMO; 3	RBR; 1; 21	RBR; 2; 8	RBR; 3; 8	MUG; 1	MUG; 2	MUG; 3	MNZ; 1	MNZ; 2	MNZ; 3		20th	20
2022	Prema Racing	IMO; 1; 7	IMO; 2; 16	IMO; 3; 7	MIS; 1; 4	MIS; 2; 2	MIS; 3; 27†	SPA; 1; 4	SPA; 2; 7	SPA; 3; 4	VLL; 1; 9	VLL; 2; 3	VLL; 3; 3	RBR; 1	RBR; 2; 5	RBR; 3; 6	RBR; 4; 14	**MNZ**; **1**; 1	MNZ; 2; 2	MNZ; 3 C	MUG; 1; 4	MUG; 2; 6	MUG; 3; 3	4th	198

=== Complete Formula 4 UAE Championship results ===
(key) (Races in bold indicate pole position) (Races in italics indicate fastest lap)

Year	Team	1	2	3	4	5	6	7	8	9	10	11	12	13	14	15	16	17	18	19	20	DC	Points
2022	Prema Racing	YAS1; 1; 8	YAS1; 2; 7	YAS1; 3; 2	YAS1; 4; 6	DUB1; 1; 3	DUB1; 2; 4	DUB1; 3; 2	DUB1; 4; 7	**DUB2**; **1**; 3	**DUB2**; **2**; 1	DUB2; 3; 3	DUB2; 4; 9	DUB3; 1; 2	**DUB3**; **2**; 2	DUB3; 3; 1	DUB3; 4; 8	YAS2; 1; 5	YAS2; 2; 4	YAS3; 3; 2	YAS4; 4; 8	1st	255

=== Complete ADAC Formula 4 Championship results ===
(key) (Races in bold indicate pole position) (Races in italics indicate fastest lap)

Year	Team	1	2	3	4	5	6	7	8	9	10	11	12	13	14	15	16	17	18	DC	Points
2022	Prema Racing	SPA; 1; 3	SPA; 2 Ret	SPA; 3; 5	HOC; 1; 4	HOC; 2; 10	HOC; 3; 6	ZAN; 1; 7	ZAN; 2; 3	ZAN; 3; 3	NÜR1; 1; 6	NÜR1; 2; 4	NÜR1; 3; 7	LAU; 1	LAU; 2	LAU; 3	NÜR2; 1	NÜR2; 2	NÜR2; 3	7th	111

=== Complete F4 Spanish Championship results ===
(key) (Races in bold indicate pole position) (Races in italics indicate fastest lap)

Year	Team	1	2	3	4	5	6	7	8	9	10	11	12	13	14	15	16	17	18	19	20	21	DC	Points
2022	Campos Racing	ALG; 1	ALG; 2	ALG; 3	JER; 1; 3	JER; 2; 7	JER; 3; 6	CRT; 1	CRT; 2	CRT; 3	SPA; 1	SPA; 2	SPA; 3	ARA; 1	ARA; 2	ARA; 3	NAV; 1	NAV; 2	NAV; 3	CAT; 1	CAT; 2	CAT; 3	15th	25

=== Complete FIA Motorsport Games results ===
Year	Team	Cup	Qualifying	Quali Race	Main race
2022	Team Austria	**Formula 4**	**2nd**	NC	11th

=== Complete Formula Regional Oceania Championship results ===
(key) (Races in bold indicate pole position) (Races in italics indicate fastest lap)

Year	Team	1	2	3	4	5	6	7	8	9	10	11	12	13	14	15	DC	Points
2023	M2 Competition	HIG; 1; 2	HIG; 2; 4	HIG; 3; 2	TER; 1; 1	TER; 2; 4	**TER**; **3**; 1	**MAN**; **1**; 5	MAN; 2; 6	**MAN**; **3**; 6	HMP; 1; 8	HMP; 2; 1	HMP; 3; 7	TAU; 1; 5	TAU; 2; 3	**TAU**; **3**; 1	1st	343

=== Complete Formula Regional European Championship results ===
(key) (Races in bold indicate pole position) (Races in italics indicate fastest lap)

Year	Team	1	2	3	4	5	6	7	8	9	10	11	12	13	14	15	16	17	18	19	20	DC	Points
2023	ART Grand Prix	IMO; 1; 26	IMO; 2; 10	CAT; 1; 16	CAT; 2; 18	HUN; 1; 22	HUN; 2; 22	SPA; 1	SPA; 2	MUG; 1; 18	MUG; 2; 13	LEC; 1 Ret	LEC; 2; 27	RBR; 1	RBR; 2	MNZ; 1	MNZ; 2	ZAN; 1	ZAN; 2	HOC; 1	HOC; 2	26th	1

=== Complete Euroformula Open Championship results ===
(key) (Races in bold indicate pole position) (Races in italics indicate fastest lap)

Year	Team	1	2	3	4	5	6	7	8	9	10	11	12	13	14	15	16	17	18	19	20	21	22	23	Pos	Points
2023	CryptoTower Racing	EST; 1	EST; 2	EST; 3	SPA; 1	SPA; 2	SPA; 3	HUN; 1	HUN; 2	HUN; 3	LEC; 1	LEC; 2	LEC; 3	RBR; 1; 5	RBR; 2; 3	RBR; 3; 4	MNZ; 1; 3	MNZ; 2; 1*	MNZ; 3 Ret	**MUG**; **1** Ret	MUG; 2; 6	CAT; 1; 2	CAT; 2; 2	CAT; 3; 5	6th	139

=== Complete Macau Grand Prix results ===
Year	Team	Car	Qualifying	Quali Race	Main race
2023	(Switzerland) Jenzer Motorsport	Dallara F3 2019	18th	11th	DNF
2025	(Australia) Evans GP	Tatuus F3 T-318	17th	19th	18th

=== Complete New Zealand Grand Prix results ===
Year	Team	Car	Qualifying	Main race
2023	(New Zealand) M2 Competition	Tatuus FT-60-Toyota	5th	7th

=== Complete FIA Formula 3 Championship results ===
(key) (Races in bold indicate pole position) (Races in italics indicate fastest lap)

Year	Entrant	1	2	3	4	5	6	7	8	9	10	11	12	13	14	15	16	17	18	19	20	DC	Points
2024	Jenzer Motorsport	BHR; SPR; 19	BHR; FEA; 16	MEL; SPR; 11	MEL; FEA; 5	IMO; SPR; 23	IMO; FEA; 24	MON; SPR; 19	MON; FEA; Ret	CAT; SPR; 16	CAT; FEA; 13	RBR; SPR; 20	RBR; FEA; 27	SIL; SPR; Ret	SIL; FEA; Ret	HUN; SPR; 17	HUN; FEA; Ret	SPA; SPR; 26	SPA; FEA; 23	MNZ; SPR; 24†	MNZ; FEA; 14	22nd	10
2025	Trident	MEL; SPR; Ret	MEL; FEA; 6	BHR; SPR; 9	BHR; FEA; 11	IMO; SPR; 23	IMO; FEA; 16	MON; SPR; 6	MON; FEA; Ret	CAT; SPR; 14	CAT; FEA; 13	RBR; SPR; Ret	RBR; FEA; 6	SIL; SPR; 9	SIL; FEA; 16	SPA; SPR; 3	SPA; FEA; C	HUN; SPR; 3	HUN; FEA; 4	MNZ; SPR; Ret	MNZ; FEA; Ret	13th	53

=== Complete Super Formula results ===
Year	Team	Engine	1	2	3	4	5	6	7	8	9	10	11	12	DC	Points
2026	Team Goh	Toyota	MOT; 15	MOT; 20	SUZ; 5	SUZ; 22	FUJ; 21	FUJ; 15	FUJ; 18	SUG; 18	FUJ; 18	FUJ; 8	SUZ	SUZ	16th*	9*

^{*} Season still in progress.

=== Complete Super GT results ===
(key) (Races in bold indicate pole position) (Races in italics indicate fastest lap)

Year	Team	Car	Class	1	2	3	4	5	6	7	8	DC	Points
2026	apr	Lexus LC 500h GT	GT300	OKA	FUJ; 3	FUJ	SUZ	SUG	AUT; Ret	MOT	MOT	31st	16

Sporting positions
Preceded by Matthew Payne (2021 TRS)	Formula Regional; Oceania Championship; Winner; 2023	Succeeded by Roman Biliński
