= 2017–18 Toyota Finance 86 Championship =

The 2017–2018 Toyota Finance 86 Championship is the fifth running of the Toyota Finance 86 Championship. The championship began on 4 November 2017 at Pukekohe Park Raceway and will conclude on 12 March 2018 at Hampton Downs Motorsport Park.

== Race calendar ==
Round		Circuit	Date	Map
1	R1	Pukekohe Park Raceway (Pukekohe, Auckland Region)	4 November 2017	2017–18 Toyota Finance 86 Championship is located in New Zealand
1	R2	Pukekohe Park Raceway (Pukekohe, Auckland Region)	5 November 2018	2017–18 Toyota Finance 86 Championship is located in New Zealand
1	R3	Pukekohe Park Raceway (Pukekohe, Auckland Region)	5 November 2018	2017–18 Toyota Finance 86 Championship is located in New Zealand
2	R1	Bruce McLaren Motorsport Park (Taupō, Waikato)	2 December 2017	2017–18 Toyota Finance 86 Championship is located in New Zealand
2	R2	Bruce McLaren Motorsport Park (Taupō, Waikato)	3 December 2017	2017–18 Toyota Finance 86 Championship is located in New Zealand
2	R3	Bruce McLaren Motorsport Park (Taupō, Waikato)	3 December 2017	2017–18 Toyota Finance 86 Championship is located in New Zealand
3	R1	Mike Pero Motorsport Park (Christchurch, Canterbury Region)	13 January 2018	2017–18 Toyota Finance 86 Championship is located in New Zealand
3	R2	Mike Pero Motorsport Park (Christchurch, Canterbury Region)	14 January 2018	2017–18 Toyota Finance 86 Championship is located in New Zealand
3	R3	Mike Pero Motorsport Park (Christchurch, Canterbury Region)	14 January 2018	2017–18 Toyota Finance 86 Championship is located in New Zealand
4	R1	Teretonga Park (Invercargill, Southland Region)	20 January 2018	2017–18 Toyota Finance 86 Championship is located in New Zealand
4	R2	Teretonga Park (Invercargill, Southland Region)	21 January 2018	2017–18 Toyota Finance 86 Championship is located in New Zealand
4	R3	Teretonga Park (Invercargill, Southland Region)	21 January 2018	2017–18 Toyota Finance 86 Championship is located in New Zealand
5	R1	Manfeild: Circuit Chris Amon (Feilding, Manawatū District)	10 February 2018	2017–18 Toyota Finance 86 Championship is located in New Zealand
5	R2	Manfeild: Circuit Chris Amon (Feilding, Manawatū District)	11 February 2018	2017–18 Toyota Finance 86 Championship is located in New Zealand
5	R3	Manfeild: Circuit Chris Amon (Feilding, Manawatū District)	11 February 2018	2017–18 Toyota Finance 86 Championship is located in New Zealand
6	R1	Hampton Downs Motorsport Park (Hampton Downs, North Waikato)	10 March 2018	2017–18 Toyota Finance 86 Championship is located in New Zealand
6	R2	Hampton Downs Motorsport Park (Hampton Downs, North Waikato)	11 March 2018	2017–18 Toyota Finance 86 Championship is located in New Zealand
6	R3	Hampton Downs Motorsport Park (Hampton Downs, North Waikato)	11 March 2018	2017–18 Toyota Finance 86 Championship is located in New Zealand

== Teams and drivers ==
All teams were New-Zealand registered.

Team	No.	Driver	Rounds
International Motorsport	3	(New Zealand) Michael Scott	All
International Motorsport	9	(New Zealand) Connor Adam	All
Ascent Motorsport	4	(New Zealand) Reid Harker	1
M2 Competition	4	(New Zealand) Peter Vodanovich	3–5
Speed Works	5	(Australia) Cameron Hill	1
Richards Team Motorsport	7	(New Zealand) Sam Wright	All
Ken Smith Motorsport	11	(New Zealand) Tom Alexander	1–4, 6
CareVets New Zealand	17	(New Zealand) Jack Milligan	All
CareVets New Zealand	18	(New Zealand) Bramwell King	All
Jordan Baldwin Motorsport	23	(New Zealand) Jordan Baldwin	All
Jacob Smith Racing	27	(New Zealand) Jacob Smith	5–6
Ben MacDonald Racing	35	(New Zealand) Ben MacDonald	1–2, 6
Jaden Ransley Motorsport	53	(New Zealand) Jaden Ransley	All
Nathan Pilcher Motorsport	55	(New Zealand) Nathan Pilcher	2
Brock Gilchrist Racing	86	(New Zealand) Brock Gilchrist	5–6
Sam Wallace Motorsport	88	(New Zealand) Sam Wallace	3–5
Quin Motorsport	91	(New Zealand) Callum Quin	1
Neale Motorsport	98	(Australia) Dylan Gulson	1

== Results and standings ==
=== Season summary ===
All rounds are to be held in New Zealand. The first round in Pukekohe Park Raceway will be held in support of the Supercars Championship. Rounds 3, 4 and 5 are to be held with the Toyota Racing Series.

Round		Circuit	Pole position	Fastest lap	Winning driver	Winning team	Round winner(s)
2017
1	R1	Pukekohe Park Raceway	(New Zealand) Connor Adam	(Australia) Cameron Hill	(New Zealand) Jack Milligan	CareVets New Zealand	(New Zealand) Tom Alexander
1	R2	Pukekohe Park Raceway		(New Zealand) Jordan Baldwin	(New Zealand) Tom Alexander	Ken Smith Motorsport	(New Zealand) Tom Alexander
1	R3	Pukekohe Park Raceway	(New Zealand) Bramwell King	(New Zealand) Jordan Baldwin	(New Zealand) Tom Alexander	Ken Smith Motorsport	(New Zealand) Tom Alexander
2	R1	Bruce McLaren Motorsport Park	(New Zealand) Michael Scott	(New Zealand) Michael Scott	(New Zealand) Michael Scott	International Motorsport	(New Zealand) Connor Adam
2	R2	Bruce McLaren Motorsport Park		(New Zealand) Tom Alexander	(New Zealand) Connor Adam	International Motorsport	(New Zealand) Connor Adam
2	R3	Bruce McLaren Motorsport Park	(New Zealand) Tom Alexander	(New Zealand) Michael Scott	(New Zealand) Tom Alexander	Ken Smith Motorsport	(New Zealand) Connor Adam
2018
3	R1	Mike Pero Motorsport Park	(New Zealand) Jack Milligan	(New Zealand) Michael Scott	(New Zealand) Jack Milligan	CareVets New Zealand	(New Zealand) Michael Scott
3	R2	Mike Pero Motorsport Park		(New Zealand) Jaden Ransley	(New Zealand) Michael Scott	International Motorsport	(New Zealand) Michael Scott
3	R3	Mike Pero Motorsport Park	(New Zealand) Jaden Ransley	(New Zealand) Michael Scott	(New Zealand) Jaden Ransley	Jaden Ransley Motorsport	(New Zealand) Michael Scott
4	R1	Teretonga Park	(New Zealand) Jaden Ransley	(New Zealand) Jack Milligan	(New Zealand) Jack Milligan	CareVets New Zealand	(New Zealand) Michael Scott
4	R2	Teretonga Park		(New Zealand) Connor Adam	(New Zealand) Michael Scott	International Motorsport	(New Zealand) Michael Scott
4	R3	Teretonga Park	(New Zealand) Jaden Ransley	(New Zealand) Jordan Baldwin	(New Zealand) Michael Scott	International Motorsport	(New Zealand) Michael Scott
5	R1	Manfeild: Circuit Chris Amon	(New Zealand) Jack Milligan	(New Zealand) Jordan Baldwin	(New Zealand) Jack Milligan	CareVets New Zealand	(New Zealand) Jack Milligan
5	R2	Manfeild: Circuit Chris Amon		(New Zealand) Michael Scott	(New Zealand) Michael Scott	International Motorsport	(New Zealand) Jack Milligan
5	R3	Manfeild: Circuit Chris Amon	(New Zealand) Jack Milligan	(New Zealand) Jack Milligan	(New Zealand) Jack Milligan	CareVets New Zealand	(New Zealand) Jack Milligan
6	R1	Hampton Downs Motorsport Park	(New Zealand) Jaden Ransley	(New Zealand) Michael Scott	(New Zealand) Jaden Ransley	Jaden Ransley Motorsport	(New Zealand) Jack Milligan
6	R2	Hampton Downs Motorsport Park		(New Zealand) Jack Milligan	(New Zealand) Jacob Smith	Albany Toyota	(New Zealand) Jack Milligan
6	R3	Hampton Downs Motorsport Park	(New Zealand) Jack Milligan	(New Zealand) Jack Milligan	(New Zealand) Tom Alexander	Ken Smith Motorsport	(New Zealand) Jack Milligan

=== Championship standings ===
In order for a driver to score championship points, they had to complete at least 75% of the race winner's distance, and be running at the finish. All races counted towards the final championship standings. The 2017–2018 New Zealand Toyota 86 Championship was won by Jack Milligan. The 2017–2018 New Zealand Toyota 86 Rookie Championship was won by Jordan Baldwin

Scoring system

Position	1st	2nd	3rd	4th	5th	6th	7th	8th	9th	10th	11th	12th	13th	14th	15th	16th	17th
Points	75	67	60	54	49	45	42	39	36	33	30	28	26	24	22	20	18

Pos.	Driver	PUK			TAU			RUA			TER			MAN			HAM			Pts
Pos.	Driver	R1	R2	R3	R1	R2	R3	R1	R2	R3	R1	R2	R3	R1	R2	R3	R1	R2	R3	Pts
1	(New Zealand) Jack Milligan	1	2	10	3	2	5	**1**	6	10	1	3	3	**1**	2	**1**	2	2	**2**	1117
2	(New Zealand) Michael Scott	9	11	4	**1**	4	3	2	1	2	3	1	1	4	1	3	7	4	13	978
3	(New Zealand) Connor Adam	**2**	9	3	4	1	2	3	7	5	9	4	5	9	5	4	8	8	5	923
4	(New Zealand) Jaden Ransley	10	7	7	2	3	4	4	2	**1**	**2**	Ret	**DNS**	5	4	5	**1**	3	14	872
5	(New Zealand) Jordan Baldwin	7	3	9	6	5	7	5	3	3	4	2	2	Ret	6	2	Ret	6	3	859
6	(New Zealand) Bramwell King	12	5	**11**	8	6	8	6	4	7	5	8	7	2	Ret	DNS	6	7	6	706
7	(New Zealand) Tom Alexander	3	1	1	7	11	**1**	8	5	4							3	14	1	666
8	(New Zealand) Sam Wright	Ret	13	12	11	9	9	10	10	8	7	7	8	7	8	8	13	13	11	591
9	(New Zealand) Peter Vodanovich							7	8	6	6	5	4	3	7	7				422
10	(New Zealand) Ben MacDonald	4	8	5	5	7	6										4	9	9	407
11	(New Zealand) Jacob Smith													6	3	6	5	1	4	328
12	(New Zealand) Sam Wallace							9	9	9	8	6	6							240
13	(New Zealand) Brock Gilchrist													8	9	9	11	11	7	186
14	(New Zealand) Reid Harker	5	6	2																161
15	(New Zealand) Callum Quin	6	10	6																123
16	(New Zealand) Matt Griffin																10	5	10	123
17	(New Zealand) Martin Short				9	8	10													108
18	(Australia) Broc Feeney																12	10	8	103
19	(Australia) Dylan Gulson	11	12	8																97
20	(New Zealand) Nathan Pilcher				10	10	11													96
21	(Australia) Cameron Hill	8	4	Ret																93
22	(New Zealand) Callum Hedge																9	12	12	75
Pos.	Driver	R1	R2	R3	R1	R2	R3	R1	R2	R3	R1	R2	R3	R1	R2	R3	R1	R2	R3	Pts
Pos.	Driver	PUK			TAU			RUA			TER			MAN			HAM			Pts

Colour	Result
Gold	Winner
Silver	Second place
Bronze	Third place
Green	Points classification
Blue	Non-points classification
Blue	Non-classified finish (NC)
Purple	Retired, not classified (Ret)
Red	Did not qualify (DNQ)
Red	Did not pre-qualify (DNPQ)
Black	Disqualified (DSQ)
White	Did not start (DNS)
White	Withdrew (WD)
White	Race cancelled (C)
Blank	Did not practice (DNP)
Blank	Did not arrive (DNA)
Blank	Excluded (EX)

**Bold** – Pole
Italics – Fastest Lap
