= 2018–19 Toyota Finance 86 Championship =

The 2018–2019 Toyota Finance 86 Championship is the sixth running of the Toyota Finance 86 Championship. The championship began on 2 November 2018 at Pukekohe Park Raceway and will conclude on 10 March 2019 at Hampton Downs Motorsport Park.

== Race calendar ==
Round		Circuit	Date	Map
1	R1	Pukekohe Park Raceway (Pukekohe, Auckland Region)	3 November 2018	2018–19 Toyota Finance 86 Championship is located in New Zealand
1	R2	Pukekohe Park Raceway (Pukekohe, Auckland Region)	4 November 2018	2018–19 Toyota Finance 86 Championship is located in New Zealand
1	R3	Pukekohe Park Raceway (Pukekohe, Auckland Region)	4 November 2018	2018–19 Toyota Finance 86 Championship is located in New Zealand
2	R1	Pukekohe Park Raceway (short circuit) (Pukekohe, Auckland Region)	8 December 2018	2018–19 Toyota Finance 86 Championship is located in New Zealand
2	R2	Pukekohe Park Raceway (short circuit) (Pukekohe, Auckland Region)	9 December 2018	2018–19 Toyota Finance 86 Championship is located in New Zealand
2	R3	Pukekohe Park Raceway (short circuit) (Pukekohe, Auckland Region)	9 December 2018	2018–19 Toyota Finance 86 Championship is located in New Zealand
3	R1	Highlands Motorsport Park (Cromwell, Otago)	12 January 2019	2018–19 Toyota Finance 86 Championship is located in New Zealand
3	R2	Highlands Motorsport Park (Cromwell, Otago)	13 January 2019	2018–19 Toyota Finance 86 Championship is located in New Zealand
3	R3	Highlands Motorsport Park (Cromwell, Otago)	13 January 2019	2018–19 Toyota Finance 86 Championship is located in New Zealand
4	R1	Teretonga Park (Invercargill, Southland Region)	19 January 2019	2018–19 Toyota Finance 86 Championship is located in New Zealand
4	R2	Teretonga Park (Invercargill, Southland Region)	20 January 2019	2018–19 Toyota Finance 86 Championship is located in New Zealand
4	R3	Teretonga Park (Invercargill, Southland Region)	20 January 2019	2018–19 Toyota Finance 86 Championship is located in New Zealand
5	R1	Manfeild: Circuit Chris Amon (Feilding, Manawatū District)	9 February 2019	2018–19 Toyota Finance 86 Championship is located in New Zealand
5	R2	Manfeild: Circuit Chris Amon (Feilding, Manawatū District)	10 February 2019	2018–19 Toyota Finance 86 Championship is located in New Zealand
5	R3	Manfeild: Circuit Chris Amon (Feilding, Manawatū District)	10 February 2019	2018–19 Toyota Finance 86 Championship is located in New Zealand
6	R1	Hampton Downs Motorsport Park (Hampton Downs, North Waikato)	9 March 2019	2018–19 Toyota Finance 86 Championship is located in New Zealand
6	R2	Hampton Downs Motorsport Park (Hampton Downs, North Waikato)	10 March 2019	2018–19 Toyota Finance 86 Championship is located in New Zealand
6	R3	Hampton Downs Motorsport Park (Hampton Downs, North Waikato)	10 March 2019	2018–19 Toyota Finance 86 Championship is located in New Zealand

== Teams and drivers ==
All teams are New-Zealand registered.

Team	No.	Driver	Rounds
Neale Motorsport	7	(New Zealand) Sam Wright	1–4
Neale Motorsport	53	(New Zealand) Jaden Ransley	1–4
International Motorsport	9	(New Zealand) Connor Adam	1–4
International Motorsport	10	(New Zealand) Brock Gilchrist	1–4
International Motorsport	97	(New Zealand) Campbell Stewart	1–4
Kaleb Ngatoa Motorsport	15	(New Zealand) Kaleb Ngatoa	1–4
CareVets Racing Team	17	(New Zealand) Callum Hedge	1–4
CareVets Racing Team	18	(New Zealand) Arran Crighton	1–4
Darkhorse Racing	21	(New Zealand) Andrew Jackson	1, 4
Darkhorse Racing	98	(New Zealand) Leo Bult	2–3
Jordan Baldwin Motorsport	23	(New Zealand) Jordan Baldwin	1–4
Jacob Cranston Motorsport	31	(New Zealand) Jacob Cranston	1–4
Genweld	71	(New Zealand) Tony Austin	1–2
Hamilton Motorsports	83	(New Zealand) Mitch Hughes	1–4
Peter Vodanovich Motorsport	84	(New Zealand) Peter Vodanovich	1–4
Toyota Racing New Zealand	86	(Australia) Jake Klien	1
M2 Competition	95	(New Zealand) Connor Davison	1–4
Allen Racing Team	99	(New Zealand) Justin Allen	1–4

== Results and standings ==
=== Season summary ===
All rounds are to be held in New Zealand. The first round in Pukekohe Park Raceway will be held in support of the Supercars Championship. Rounds 3, 4 and 5 are to be held with the Toyota Racing Series.

Round		Circuit	Date	Pole position	Fastest lap	Winning driver	Winning team
2018
1	R1	Pukekohe Park Raceway; Pukekohe, Auckland	November 2–4	(New Zealand) Jordan Baldwin	(New Zealand) Callum Hedge	(New Zealand) Connor Adam	International Motorsport
1	R2	Pukekohe Park Raceway; Pukekohe, Auckland	November 2–4	(New Zealand) Jordan Baldwin	(New Zealand) Callum Hedge	(New Zealand) Connor Adam	International Motorsport
1	R3	Pukekohe Park Raceway; Pukekohe, Auckland	November 2–4		(Australia) Jake Klien	(New Zealand) Callum Hedge	CareVets Racing Team
2	R1	Pukekohe Park Raceway (short circuit); Pukekohe, Auckland	December 7–9	(New Zealand) Peter Vodanovich	(New Zealand) Arran Crighton	(New Zealand) Jaden Ransley	Neale Motorsport
2	R2	Pukekohe Park Raceway (short circuit); Pukekohe, Auckland	December 7–9	(New Zealand) Peter Vodanovich	(New Zealand) Arran Crighton	(New Zealand) Callum Hedge	CareVets Racing Team
2	R3	Pukekohe Park Raceway (short circuit); Pukekohe, Auckland	December 7–9		(New Zealand) Arran Crighton	(New Zealand) Callum Hedge	CareVets Racing Team
2019
3	R1	Highlands Motorsport Park; Cromwell, Otago	January 11–13	(New Zealand) Callum Hedge	(New Zealand) Callum Hedge	(New Zealand) Callum Hedge	CareVets Racing Team
3	R2	Highlands Motorsport Park; Cromwell, Otago	January 11–13	(New Zealand) Callum Hedge	(New Zealand) Arran Crighton	(New Zealand) Callum Hedge	CareVets Racing Team
3	R3	Highlands Motorsport Park; Cromwell, Otago	January 11–13		(New Zealand) Jaden Ransley	(New Zealand) Peter Vodanovich	Peter Vodanovich Motorsport
4	R1	Teretonga Park, Invercargill; Southland	January 18–20	(New Zealand) Jaden Ransley	(New Zealand) Callum Hedge	(New Zealand) Jordan Baldwin	Jordan Baldwin Motorsport
4	R2	Teretonga Park, Invercargill; Southland	January 18–20	(New Zealand) Jaden Ransley	(New Zealand) Jaden Ransley	(New Zealand) Jordan Baldwin	Jordan Baldwin Motorsport
4	R3	Teretonga Park, Invercargill; Southland	January 18–20		(New Zealand) Jaden Ransley	(New Zealand) Jaden Ransley	Neale Motorsport
5	R1	Circuit Chris Amon; Feilding, Manawatū District	February 8–10	(New Zealand) Jaden Ransley	(New Zealand) Connor Adam	(New Zealand) Jaden Ransley	Neale Motorsport
5	R2	Circuit Chris Amon; Feilding, Manawatū District	February 8–10	(New Zealand) Jaden Ransley	(New Zealand) Callum Hedge	(New Zealand) Callum Hedge	CareVets Racing Team
5	R3	Circuit Chris Amon; Feilding, Manawatū District	February 8–10		(New Zealand) Peter Vodanovich	(New Zealand) Callum Hedge	CareVets Racing Team
6	R1	Hampton Downs Motorsport Park; Hampton Downs, North Waikato	March 9–10	(New Zealand) Callum Hedge	(New Zealand) Kaleb Ngatoa	(New Zealand) Callum Hedge	CareVets Racing Team
6	R2	Hampton Downs Motorsport Park; Hampton Downs, North Waikato	March 9–10	(New Zealand) Callum Hedge	(New Zealand) Kaleb Ngatoa	(New Zealand) Kaleb Ngatoa	Kaleb Ngatoa Motorsport
6	R3	Hampton Downs Motorsport Park; Hampton Downs, North Waikato	March 9–10		(New Zealand) Callum Hedge	(New Zealand) Callum Hedge	CareVets Racing Team

=== Championship standings ===
In order for a driver to score championship points, they had to complete at least 75% of the race winner's distance, and be running at the finish. All races counted towards the final championship standings.

Scoring system

Position	1st	2nd	3rd	4th	5th	6th	7th	8th	9th	10th	11th	12th	13th	14th	15th	16th	17th
Points	75	67	60	54	49	45	42	39	36	33	30	28	26	24	22	20	18

Pos.	Driver	PUK1			PUK2			HIG			TER			MAN			HAM			Points
Pos.	Driver	R1	R2	R3	R1	R2	R3	R1	R2	R3	R1	R2	R3	R1	R2	R3	R1	R2	R3	Points
1	(New Zealand) Callum Hedge	4	3	1	8	1	1	1	4	2										1138
2	(New Zealand) Jaden Ransley	3	4	3	1	4	3	15	1	3										1038
3	(New Zealand) Jordan Baldwin	**2**	**2**	4	4	8	2	4	2	5										957
4	(New Zealand) Peter Vodanovich	Ret	6	9	3	2	8	2	3	1										895
5	(New Zealand) Brock Gilchrist	5	9	6	9	7	4	6	9	7										787
6	(New Zealand) Arran Crighton	13	13	10	**2**	**6**	12	3	5	4										785
7	(New Zealand) Kaleb Ngatoa	15	7	12	5	5	7	10	14	11										781
8	(New Zealand) Connor Adam	1	1	2	7	3	6	5	6	13										777
9	(New Zealand) Jacob Cranston	11	14	11	11	9	11	8	8	8										654
10	(New Zealand) Campbell Stewart	12	12	8	6	14	15	7	10	10										637
11	(New Zealand) Sam Wright	10	10	14	12	10	13	12	12	6										543
12	(New Zealand) Connor Davison	14	16	15	13	9	5	9	7	15										541
13	(New Zealand) Justin Allen	7	8	16	Ret	DSQ	10	11	DSQ	9										538
14	(New Zealand) Andrew Jackson	8	11	7																396
15	(New Zealand) Leo Bult				14	12	11	13	11	12										312
16	(New Zealand) Mitch Hughes	9	15	13	10	Ret	14	14	13	14										215
17	(Australia) Jake Klien	6	6	5																143
18	(New Zealand) Tony Austin	16	17	17	15	13	Ret													102
Pos.	Driver	R1	R2	R3	R1	R2	R3	R1	R2	R3	R1	R2	R3	R1	R2	R3	R1	R2	R3	Points
Pos.	Driver	PUK1			PUK2			HIG			TER			MAN			HAM			Points

Colour	Result
Gold	Winner
Silver	Second place
Bronze	Third place
Green	Points classification
Blue	Non-points classification
Blue	Non-classified finish (NC)
Purple	Retired, not classified (Ret)
Red	Did not qualify (DNQ)
Red	Did not pre-qualify (DNPQ)
Black	Disqualified (DSQ)
White	Did not start (DNS)
White	Withdrew (WD)
White	Race cancelled (C)
Blank	Did not practice (DNP)
Blank	Did not arrive (DNA)
Blank	Excluded (EX)

Bold – Pole
Italics – Fastest Lap
