= 2017 Australian GT Championship =

Motor racing competition

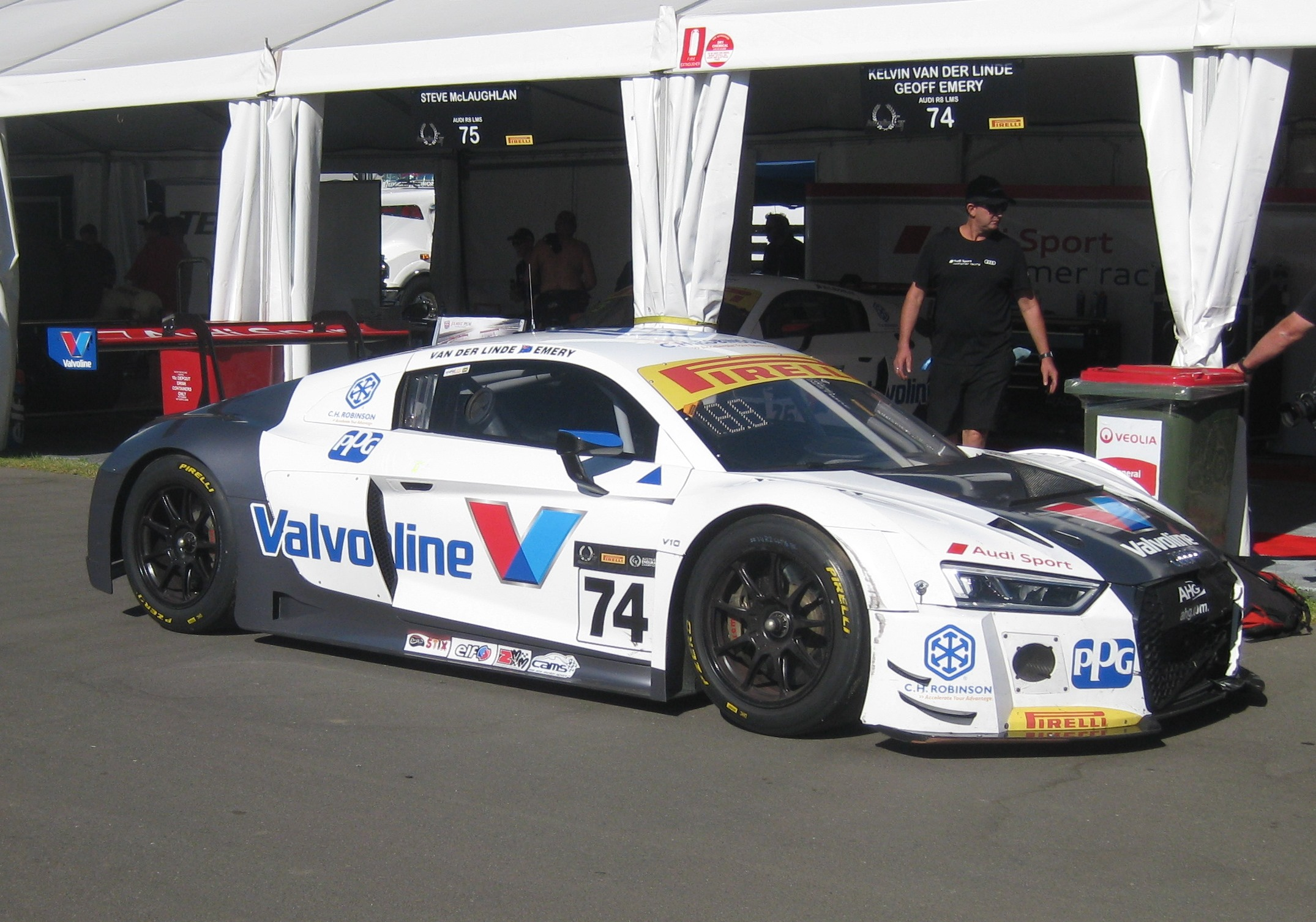
Geoff Emery won the 2017 Australian GT Championship driving an Audi R8 LMS

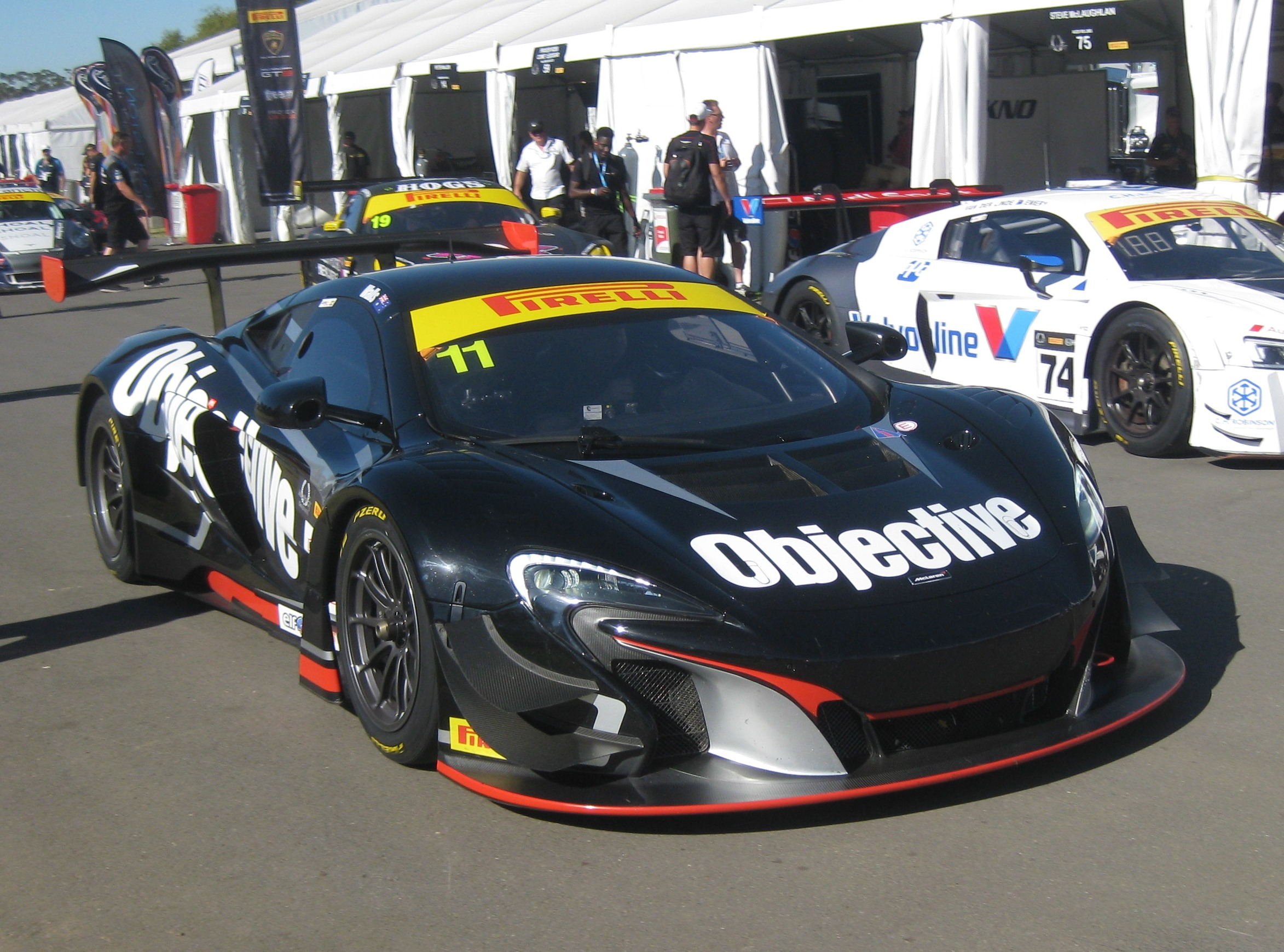
Tony Walls placed 12th in the 2017 Australian GT Championship driving a McLaren 650S GT3

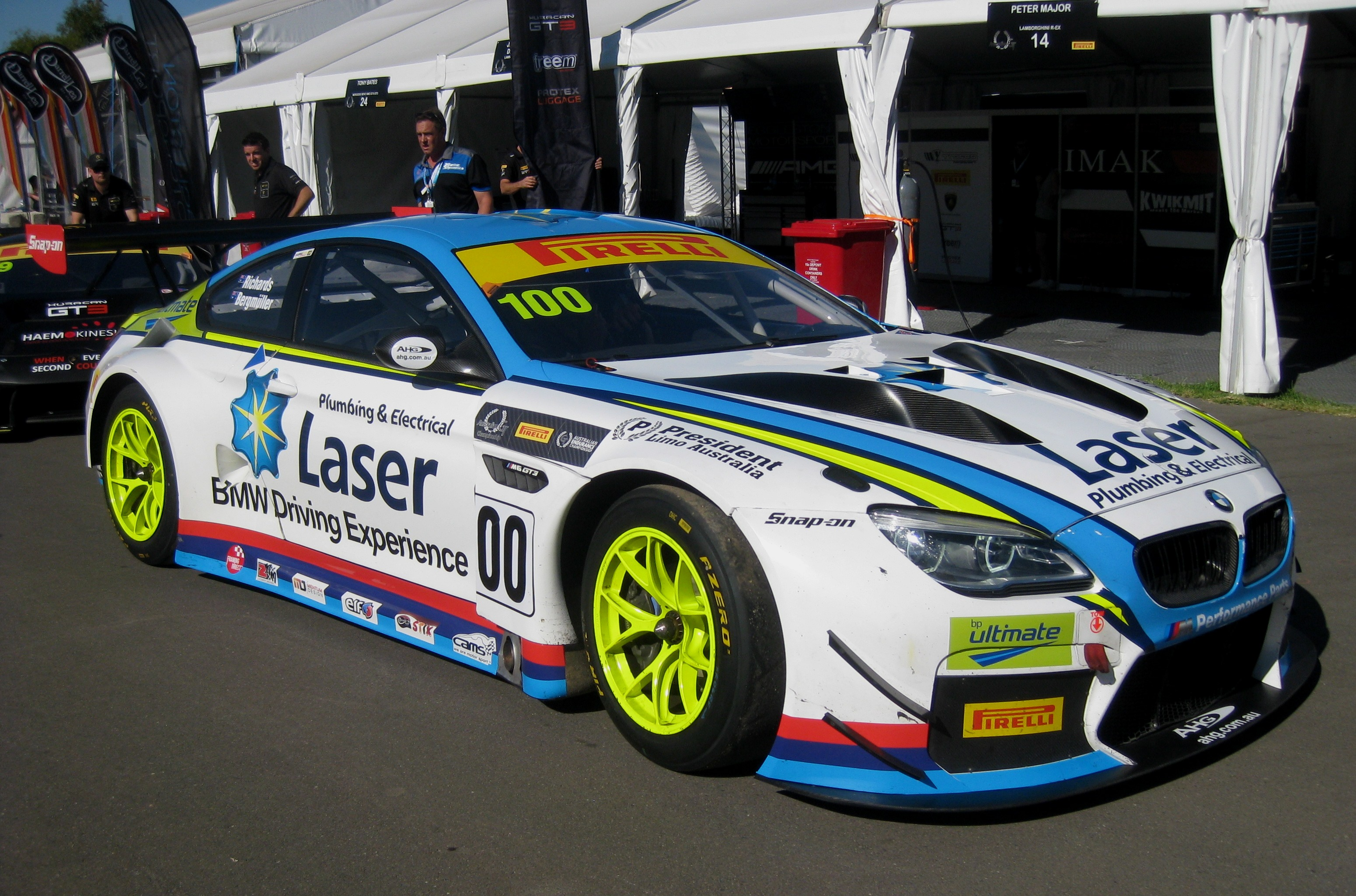
Steven Richards and James Burgmuller shared 14th place in the 2017 Australian GT Championship driving a BMW M6 GT3

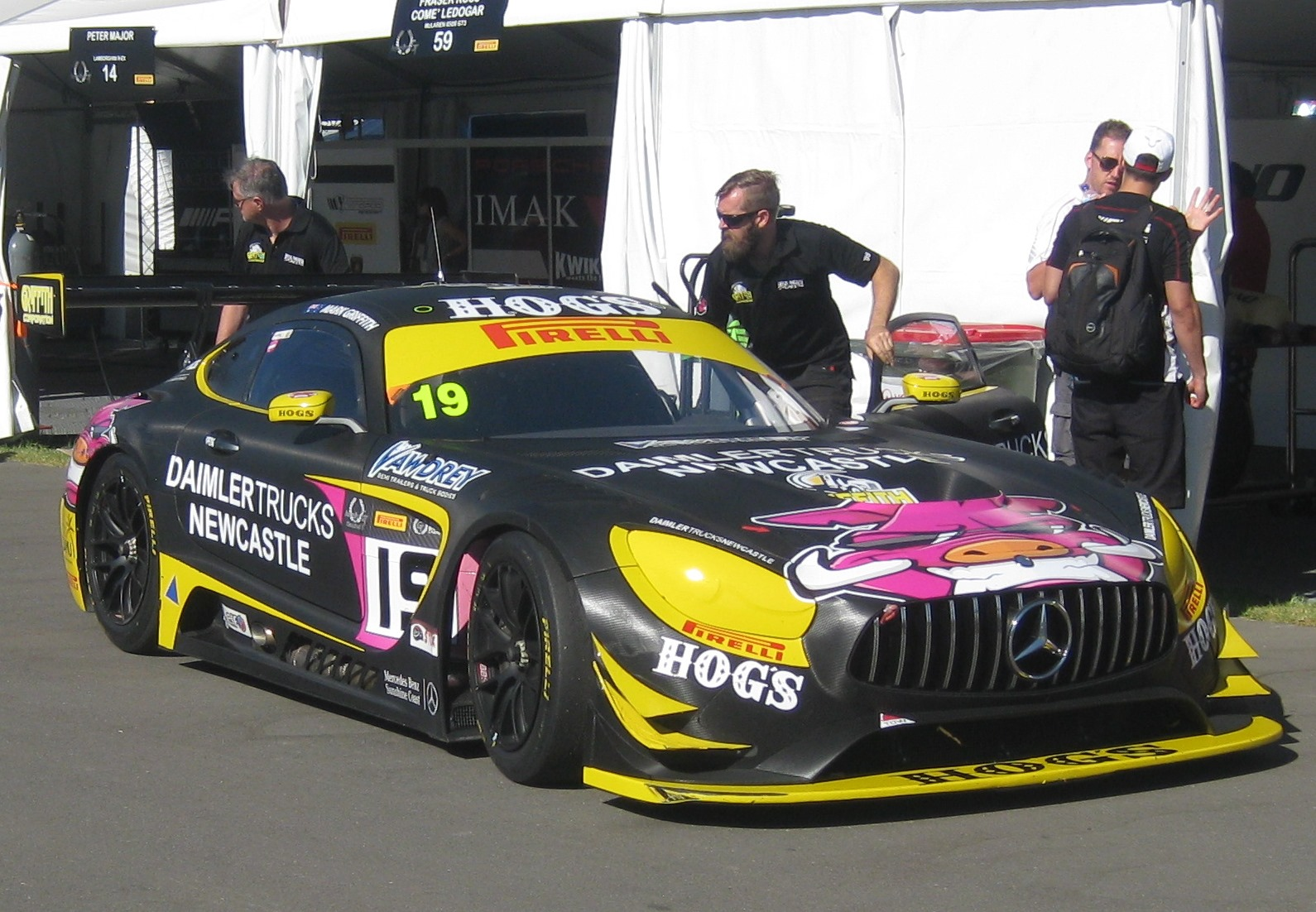
Mark Griffith placed 15th in the 2017 Australian GT Championship driving a Mercedes-AMG GT3

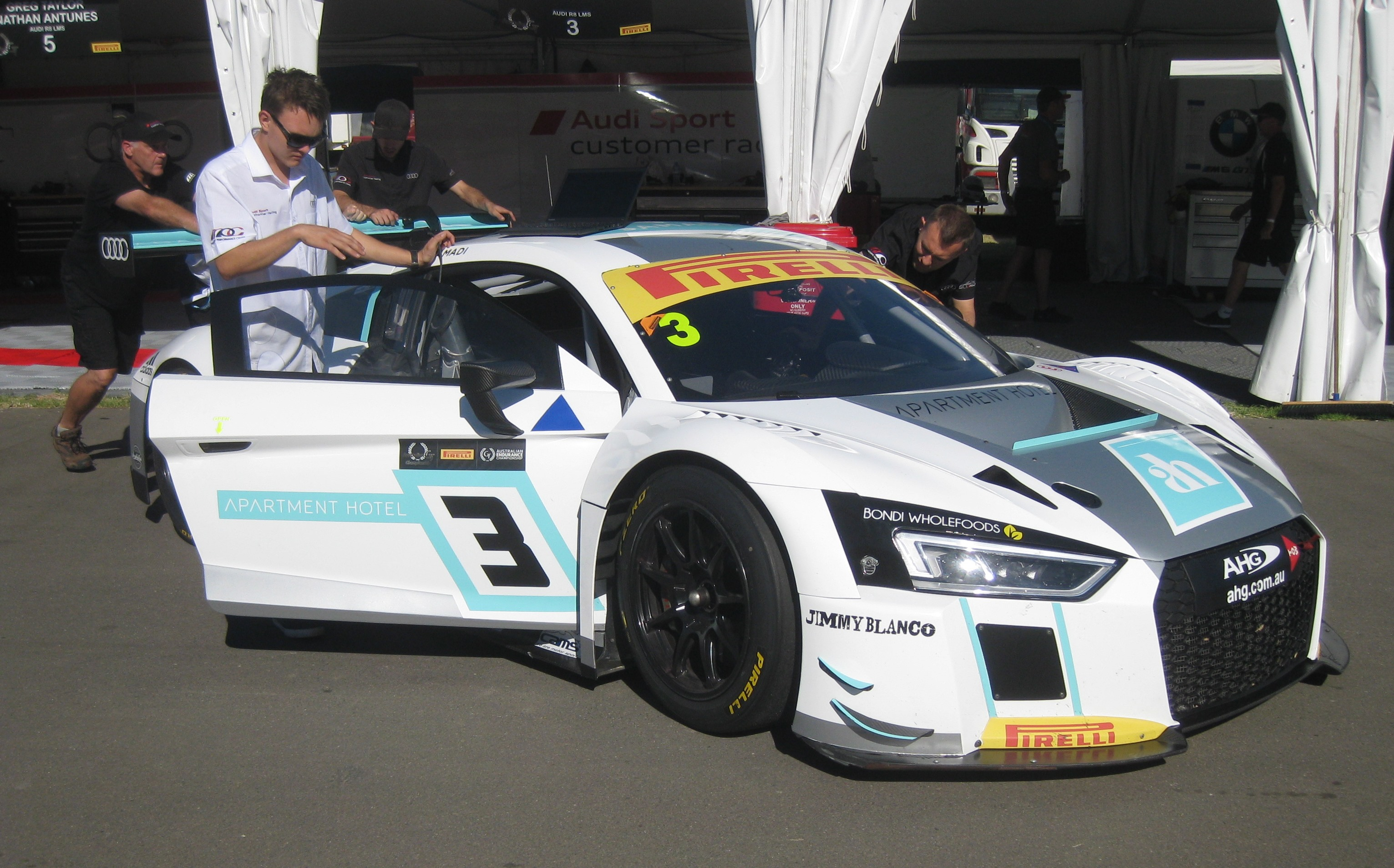
Ash Samadi placed 16th in the 2017 Australian GT Championship driving an Audi R8 LMS

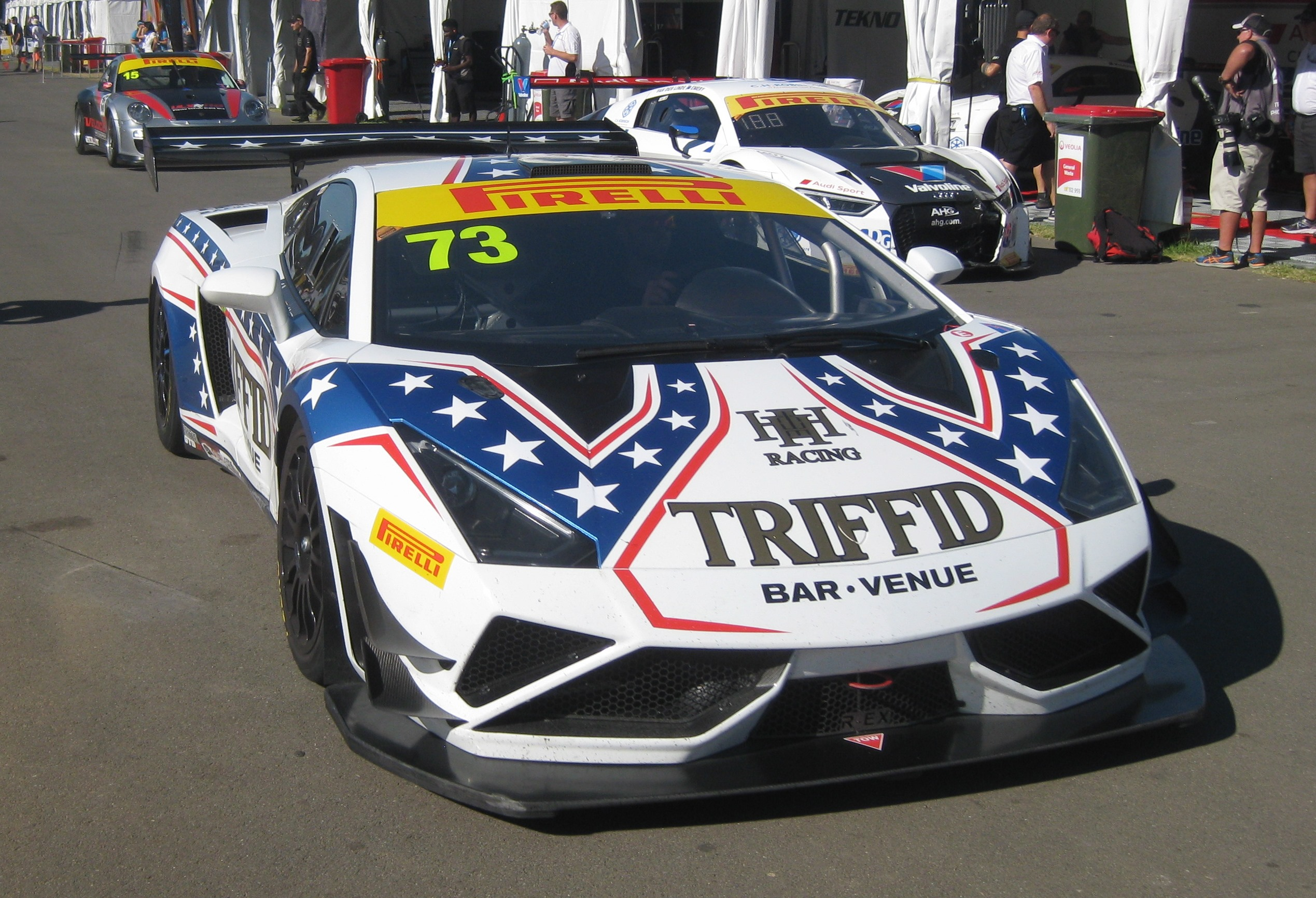
Michael Hovey placed 33rd driving a Lamborghini Gallardo R-EX

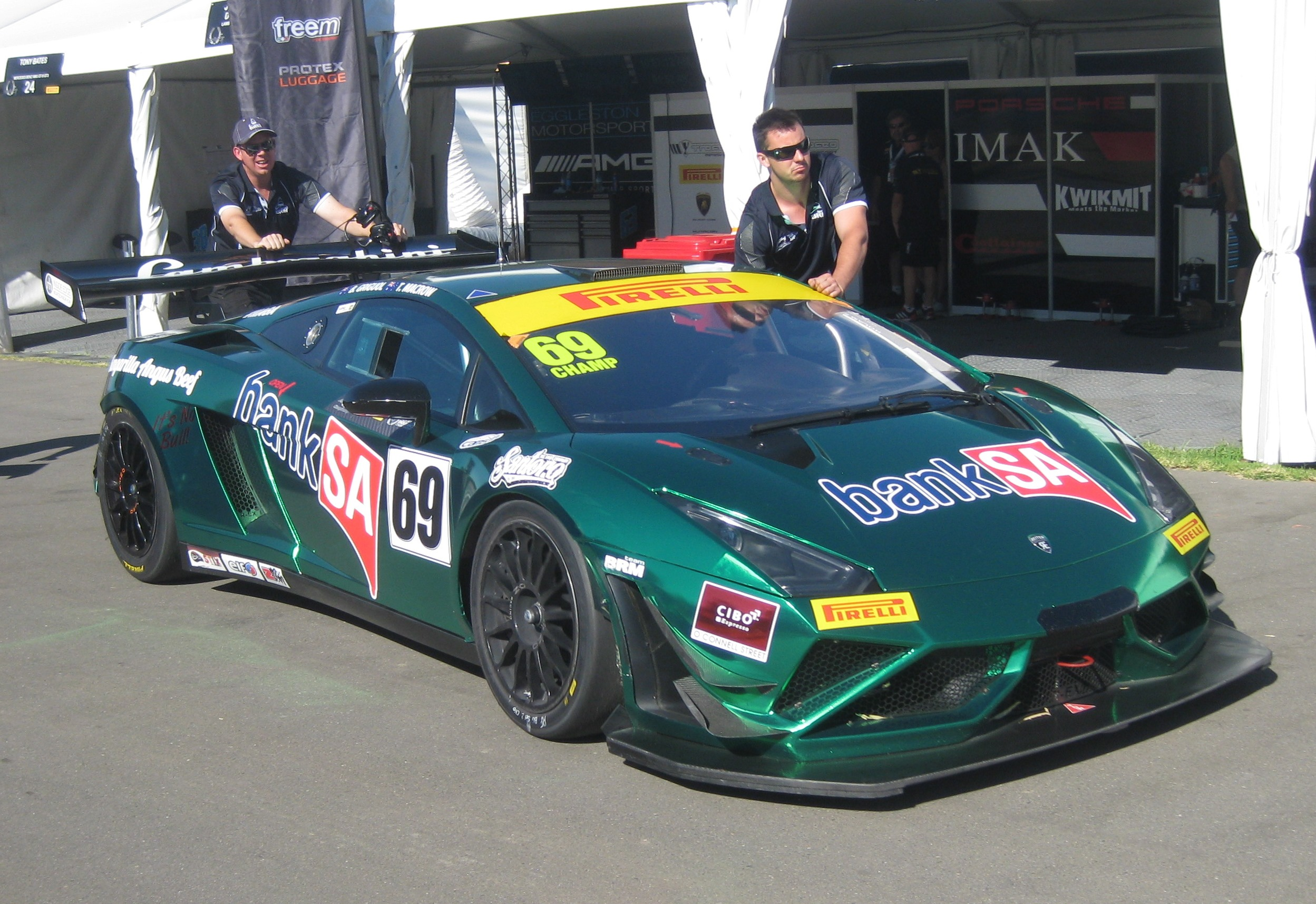
Brenton Griguol & Tim Macrow placed 35th driving a Lamborghini Gallardo R-EX

The 2017 Australian GT Championship was the 21st running of the Australian GT Championship, a CAMS-sanctioned Australian motor racing championship open to FIA GT3 cars and similar cars as approved for the championship. The championship commenced on 2 March 2017 at the Adelaide Street Circuit and concluded on 19 November at Wakefield Park, with two rounds held in New Zealand.

Following the success of the previous year, a second series for GT3 cars, the Australian Endurance Championship was also contested. A third series for older-specification GT3 and GT4 class cars, the CAMS Australian GT Trophy Series, was also held.

The Australian GT Championship events were held in support of five V8 Supercar events. The Australian Endurance Championship shared an event with the Shannons Nationals, another with V8 Supercars, and its final two rounds were staged at Hampton Downs and Highlands Motorsport Park, both owned by series owner Tony Quinn. The Australian GT Trophy Series was contested exclusively at Shannons Nationals events.

The Australian GT Championship was won by Geoff Emery driving an Audi R8 LMS.

== Series ==
The 2017 season included three separate series:

- CAMS Australian GT Championship, shorter races for current-specification GT3 cars.
- CAMS Australian Endurance Championship, longer endurance races featuring multiple drivers and current-specification GT3 cars.
- CAMS Australian GT Trophy Series, shorter races for older-specification GT3 and GT4 cars.

All competitors are able to enter the Australian GT Championship and the Australian Endurance Championship, and all were eligible to win the championships outright, however only older-specification cars could enter the Australian GT Trophy Series.

=== Race calendar ===
The Australian GT Championship is contested over five rounds, the Australian Endurance Championship over four rounds and the Australian GT Trophy Series over five rounds. Each race, with the exception of the Australian Grand Prix round of the Australian GT Championship, includes at least one compulsory timed pit stop.

Australian GT Championship

Round	Circuit	Location	Race format	Date
1	Adelaide Street Circuit	Adelaide, South Australia	3 x 40 min	2–5 March
2	Melbourne Grand Prix Circuit	Melbourne, Victoria	4 x 25 min	23–26 March
3	Barbagallo Raceway	Perth, Western Australia	2 x 60 min	5–7 May
4	Townsville Street Circuit	Townsville, Queensland	3 x 40 min	8–10 July
5	Sandown Raceway	Melbourne, Victoria	3 x 40 min	15–17 September

Australian Endurance Championship

Round	Name	Circuit	Location	Race format	Date
1	AEC Philip Island 500	Phillip Island Grand Prix Circuit	Phillip Island, Victoria	500 km	26–28 May
2	AEC Sydney 501	Sydney Motorsport Park	Eastern Creek, New South Wales	500 km	18–20 August
3	Hampton Downs 500	Hampton Downs Motorsport Park	Waikato, New Zealand	500 km	27–29 October
4	Highlands 501	Highlands Motorsport Park	Cromwell, New Zealand	500 km	10–12 November

Australian GT Trophy Series

Round	Circuit	Location	Race format	Date
1	Sandown Raceway	Melbourne, Victoria	2 x 50 min	8–9 April
2	Winton Motor Raceway	Benalla, Victoria	2 x 50 min	10–11 June
3	Queensland Raceway	Ipswich, Queensland	2 x 50 min	5–6 August
4	Phillip Island Grand Prix Circuit	Phillip Island, Victoria	2 x 50 min	9–10 September
5	Wakefield Park	Goulburn, New South Wales	2 x 50 min	18–19 November

== Australian GT Championship ==
=== Teams and drivers ===
Team	Vehicle	No.	Drivers	Class	Events
Audi Sport Customer Racing; Ah Apartments	Audi R8 LMS	3	(Australia) Ash Samadi	GT	All
Audi Sport Customer Racing; Hallmarc Constructions	Audi R8 LMS	9	(Australia) Marc Cini	GT	1–2, 4
Audi Sport Customer Racing; Hallmarc Constructions	Audi R8 LMS	9	(Australia) Dean Fiore	GT	2
Audi Sport Customer Racing; Supabarn Supermarkets	Audi R8 LMS	44	(Australia) Ash Walsh	GT	All
Audi Sport Customer Racing; Supabarn Supermarkets	Audi R8 LMS	44	(Australia) James Koundouris	GT	1–3
Audi Sport Customer Racing; Supabarn Supermarkets	Audi R8 LMS	44	(Australia) Duvashen Padayachee	GT	4–5
Audi Sport Customer Racing; JAMEC PEM Racing	Audi R8 LMS	74	(Australia) Geoff Emery	GT	All
Audi Sport Customer Racing; JAMEC PEM Racing	Audi R8 LMS	74	(South Africa) Kelvin van der Linde	GT	1–4
Audi Sport Customer Racing; JAMEC PEM Racing	Audi R8 LMS	75	(Australia) Steve McLaughlan	GT	1, 5
Audi Sport Customer Racing; JAMEC PEM Racing	Audi R8 LMS	75	(New Zealand) Tim Miles	GT	2
Audi Sport Customer Racing; KFC Racing	Audi R8 LMS	124	(New Zealand) Daniel Gaunt	GT	2–3
Audi Sport Customer Racing; KFC Racing	Audi R8 LMS	124	(Australia) Gary Higgon	GT	2–3
McElrea Racing	Lamborghini Gallardo R-EX	4	(New Zealand) Tim Miles	GT	1
McElrea Racing; Objective Racing	McLaren 650S GT3	11	(Australia) Tony Walls	GT	1–4
GT Motorsport	Audi R8 LMS	5	(Australia) Greg Taylor	GT	1, 3
GT Motorsport	Audi R8 LMS	5	(Australia) Nathan Antunes	GT	1
Zagame Motorsport	Lamborghini Huracán GT3	6	(Australia) Adrian Deitz	GT	2
Zagame Motorsport	Lamborghini Huracán GT3	6	(Australia) Cameron McConville	GT	2
Darrell Lea/Keltic Racing	McLaren 650S GT3	7	(United Kingdom) Tony Quinn	GT	All
Scott Taylor Motorsport	Mercedes-AMG GT3	8	(Australia) Max Twigg	GT	All
Scott Taylor Motorsport	Mercedes-AMG GT3	222	(New Zealand) Craig Baird	GT	1
Scott Taylor Motorsport	Mercedes-AMG GT3	222	(Australia) Scott Taylor	GT	1–4
PM Motorsport	Lamborghini Gallardo R-EX	14	(Australia) Peter Major	GT	1–3
Veloce Motorsport - ULX110	Porsche 997 GT3 Cup	15	(Australia) Keith Wong	GT-I	1
Erebus Motorsport; Hog's Breath Cafe/Griffith Corporation	Mercedes-AMG GT3	19	(Australia) Mark Griffith	GT	1–3, 5
Erebus Motorsport; Hog's Breath Cafe/Griffith Corporation	Mercedes-AMG GT3	19	(Australia) Jake Camilleri	GT	2–3
Rosso Verde Racing	Ferrari 458 GT3	21	(Republic of Ireland) Hector Lester	GT-I	2
Rosso Verde Racing	Ferrari 458 GT3	21	(Denmark) Benny Simonsen	GT-I	2
JBS Australia	Lamborghini Gallardo R-EX	23	(Australia) Roger Lago	GT	1–4
JBS Australia	Lamborghini Gallardo R-EX	23	(Australia) David Russell	GT	2
Eggleston Motorsport	Mercedes-AMG GT3	24	(Australia) Tony Bates	GT	1–4
Trofeo Motorsport	Lamborghini Huracán GT3	29	(Australia) Dean Canto	GT	1
Trofeo Motorsport	Lamborghini Huracán GT3	29	(Italy) Ivan Capelli	GT	2
Trofeo Motorsport	Lamborghini Huracán GT3	29	(Australia) Jim Manolios	GT	1, 5
Trofeo Motorsport	Lamborghini Huracán GT3	29	(Australia) Ryan Millier	GT	2, 5
M Motorsport	Lamborghini Gallardo R-EX	48	(Australia) Justin McMillan	GT	1
M Motorsport	Lamborghini Gallardo R-EX	48	(Australia) Glen Wood	GT	1–2, 4
M Motorsport	Lamborghini Gallardo R-EX	48	(Australia) Yasser Shahin	GT	2
AMAC Motorsport	Porsche 997 GT3-R	51	(Australia) Andrew MacPherson	GT	1, 4
AMAC Motorsport	Porsche 997 GT3-R	51	(Australia) Brad Shiels	GT	4
AMAC Motorsport	Lamborghini Huracán GT3	51	(Australia) Andrew MacPherson	GT	2–3
AMAC Motorsport	Lamborghini Huracán GT3	51	(Australia) Brad Shiels	GT	3
Tekno Autosports	McLaren 650S GT3	58	(Australia) Fraser Ross	GT	5
Tekno Autosports	McLaren 650S GT3	59	(Australia) Fraser Ross	GT	1–4
Tekno Autosports	McLaren 650S GT3	59	(France) Côme Ledogar	GT	1
Tekno Autosports	McLaren 650S GT3	59	(United Kingdom) Lewis Williamson	GT	2
Michael O'Donnell	Porsche 997 GT3 Cup	68	(Australia) Michael O'Donnell	GT-I	1–2
Koala Motorsport	Lamborghini Gallardo R-EX	69	(Australia) Brenton Griguol	GT	1
Koala Motorsport	Lamborghini Gallardo R-EX	69	(Australia) Tim Macrow	GT	1
Triffid Bar Venue	Lamborghini Gallardo R-EX	73	(Australia) Michael Hovey	GT	1–2
Triffid Bar Venue	Lamborghini Gallardo R-EX	73	(New Zealand) Daniel Jilesen	GT	1
Maranello Motorsport	Ferrari 488 GT3	88	(Australia) Peter Edwards	GT	2
Fire Rating Solutions	Lamborghini Gallardo LP-560 GT3	99	(Australia) Matthew Turnbull	GT-I	2
BMW Team SRM	BMW M6 GT3	100	(Australia) James Bergmuller	GT	All
BMW Team SRM	BMW M6 GT3	100	(New Zealand) Steven Richards	GT	All
DJS Racing	BMW M6 GT3	101	(Australia) Danny Stutterd	GT	2–3
Mack Roofing Products	Ferrari 458 GT3	147	(Australia) Wayne Mack	GT-I	2
Industrie Clothing	Audi R8 LMS ultra	199	(Australia) Nick Kelly	GT	2
The Bend Motorsport	Lamborghini Gallardo R-EX	777	(Australia) Yasser Shahin	GT	1
Walkinshaw Racing	Porsche 911 GT3-R	911	(Australia) Liam Talbot	GT	All

Class	Meaning
GT	Australian GT Championship
GT-I	Australian GT Championship (Invitational Class)

=== Race results ===
Round		Circuit	Pole position	Race winner
1	R1	Adelaide	No. 74 JAMEC PEM Racing	No. 24 Eggleston Motorsport
1	R1	Adelaide	(Australia) Geoff Emery (South Africa) Kelvin van der Linde	(Australia) Tony Bates
1	R2	Adelaide		No. 14 PM Motorsport
1	R2	Adelaide		(Australia) Peter Major
1	R3	Adelaide		No. 24 Eggleston Motorsport
1	R3	Adelaide		(Australia) Tony Bates
2	R1	Albert Park	No. 74 JAMEC PEM Racing	No. 74 JAMEC PEM Racing
2	R1	Albert Park	(Australia) Geoff Emery (South Africa) Kelvin van der Linde	(Australia) Geoff Emery (South Africa) Kelvin van der Linde
2	R2	Albert Park	No. 8 Scott Taylor Motorsport	No. 23 JBS Australia
2	R2	Albert Park	(Australia) Max Twigg	(Australia) Roger Lago (Australia) David Russell
2	R3	Albert Park		No. 74 JAMEC PEM Racing
2	R3	Albert Park		(Australia) Geoff Emery (South Africa) Kelvin van der Linde
2	R4	Albert Park		No. 911 Walkinshaw Racing
2	R4	Albert Park		(Australia) Liam Talbot
3	R1	Barbagallo	No. 44 Supabarn Supermarkets	No. 911 Walkinshaw Racing
3	R1	Barbagallo	(Australia) James Koundouris (Australia) Ash Walsh	(Australia) Liam Talbot
3	R2	Barbagallo		No. 14 PM Motorsport
3	R2	Barbagallo		(Australia) Peter Major
4	R1	Townsville	No. 74 JAMEC PEM Racing	No. 911 Walkinshaw Racing
4	R1	Townsville	(Australia) Geoff Emery (South Africa) Kelvin van der Linde	(Australia) Liam Talbot
4	R2	Townsville		No. 48 M Motorsport
4	R2	Townsville		(Australia) Glen Wood
4	R3	Townsville		No. 8 Scott Taylor Motorsport
4	R3	Townsville		(Australia) Max Twigg
5	R1	Sandown	No. 44 Supabarn Supermarkets	No. 74 JAMEC PEM Racing
5	R1	Sandown	(Australia) Duvashen Padayachee (Australia) Ash Walsh	(Australia) Geoff Emery
5	R2	Sandown		No. 7 Darrell Lea/Keltic Racing
5	R2	Sandown		(United Kingdom) Tony Quinn
5	R3	Sandown		No. 58 Tekno Autosports
5	R3	Sandown		(Australia) Fraser Ross

=== Points system ===
Points are awarded as follows:

Position	**1st**	**2nd**	**3rd**	**4th**	**5th**	**6th**	**7th**	**8th**	**9th**	**10th**	**11th**	**12th**	**13th**	**14th**	**15th**	**16th**	**17th**	**18th**	**19th**	**20th**	**21st**	**22nd**	**23rd**	**24th**	**25th**	**26th+**
Qualifying session	10	8	7	6	5	4	3	2	1																	
Rounds 1, 4–5	67	56	47	40	33	27	24	21	19	16	15	13	12	10	8	7	6	5	5	4	3	3	2	2	2	1
Round 2 R1	25	21	18	15	13	10	9	8	7	6	6	5	5	4	3	3	2	2	2	2	1	1	1	1	1	1
Round 2 R2	45	38	32	27	23	18	16	14	13	11	10	9	8	7	5	5	4	4	3	3	2	2	1	1	1	1
Round 2 R3	50	42	35	30	25	20	18	16	14	12	11	10	9	8	6	5	4	4	3	3	2	2	1	1	1	1
Round 2 R4	80	67	56	48	40	32	29	26	22	19	18	16	14	13	10	8	6	6	5	5	3	3	1	1	1	1
Round 3	100	84	70	60	50	40	36	32	28	24	23	20	18	15	13	10	9	8	7	6	5	4	3	2	2	1

=== Championship standings ===
Pos	Driver	ADE (South Australia)					ALB (Victoria (state))						BAR (Western Australia)				TOW (Queensland)					SAN (Victoria (state))					Pts
Pos	Driver	R1	R2	R3	QP	RP	R1	R2	R3	R4	QP	RP	R1	R2	QP	RP	R1	R2	R3	QP	RP	R1	R2	R3	QP	RP	Pts
1	Geoff Emery	13	12	9	15	59	1	8	1	3	17	162	4	3	14	144	4	2	4	15	151	1	2	5	8	164	680
2	Liam Talbot	4	4	6	4	111	10	4	10	1	4	129	1	6	13	153	1	3	5	4	151	3	10	2	7	126	670
3	Ash Walsh	6	6	16	14	76	3	6	4	6	10	108	6	2	11	135	5	5	2	14	136	4	5	3	10	130	585
4	Kelvin van der Linde	13	12	9	15	59	1	8	1	3	17	162	4	3	14	144	4	2	4	15	151						516
5	Fraser Ross	8	7	11	6	66	7	2	5	15	7	89	2	9	10	122	10	Ret	14	11	37	2	6	1	5	155	469
6	Max Twigg	21	9	5		57	11	3	11	2	10	126	5	5	4	104	12	8	1	7	108	8	8	9	1	62	457
7	Roger Lago	2	2	2	12	180	4	1	3	4	14	157	Ret	11	5	28	13	6	6	10	76						441
8	Tony Bates	1	3	1	8	189	14	23	12	8	6	48	11	4		83	Ret	DNS	DNS	6	6						326
9	Peter Major	3	1	4	7	161	12	5	Ret	Ret	5	33	13	1	8	126											320
10	James Koundouris	6	6	16	14	76	3	6	4	6	10	108	6	2	11	135											319
11	Glen Wood	11	Ret	DNS		15	6	12	9	5	2	75					3	1	3	17	178						268
12	Tony Walls	5	13	3		92	26	11	21	7		42	3	Ret	7	77	8	7	13		57						268
13	Duvashen Padayachee																5	5	2	14	136	4	5	3	10	130	266
14=	James Bergmuller	16	Ret	19	1	14	8	17	8	12	5	50	10	7	1	61	11	10	12	1	45	9	4	8	6	86	256
14=	Steven Richards	16	Ret	19	1	14	8	17	8	12	5	50	10	7	1	61	11	10	12	1	45	9	4	8	6	86	256
15	Mark Griffith	7	8	8		66	18	14	13	11		36	9	8	3	63						7	9	4		83	248
16	Ash Samadi	15	Ret	10	2	26	16	DNS	DNS	DNS		4	12	13	5	43	6	4	7	1	92	5	Ret	10	2	51	216
17	Tony Quinn	Ret	DNS	DNS		0	20	21	19	17		14	16	12		30	9	9	9		57	10	1	7		107	208
18	Scott Taylor	10	15	18	4	35	23	7	17	21		26	8	Ret		32	2	13	8		89						182
19	David Russell						4	1	3	4	14	157															157
20	Marc Cini	18	Ret	13		17	5	16	6	9	4	64					7	11	10		55						136
21	Andrew MacPherson	17	DSQ	14		16	24	22	24	18		11	7	10	4	64	Ret	12	11	6	34						125
22	Steve McLaughlan	9	DNS	DNS	1	20																6	3	6	3	104	124
23	Jake Camilleri						18	14	13	11		36	9	8	3	63											99
24	Brad Shiels												7	10	4	64	Ret	12	11	6	34						98
25=	Daniel Gaunt						2	25	2	23	7	75	15	DNS	7	20											95
25=	Gary Higgon						2	25	2	23	7	75	15	DNS	7	20											95
26	Lewis Williamson						7	2	5	15	7	89															89
27	Yasser Shahin	WD	WD	WD		0	6	12	9	5	2	75															75
28	Ryan Millier						13	9	14	Ret		26										11	7	Ret	4	43	69
29	Jim Manolios	22	11	Ret	5	24																11	7	Ret	4	43	67
30	Côme Ledogar	8	7	11	6	66																					66
31	Dean Fiore						5	16	6	9	4	64															64
32	Tim Miles	23	5	Ret		36	15	27	18	10		27															63
33	Michael Hovey	14	18	7		41	22	18	22	16		15															56
34	Daniel Jilesen	14	18	7		41																					41
35=	Brenton Griguol	12	14	12	3	39																					39
35=	Tim Macrow	12	14	12	3	39																					39
36	Craig Baird	10	15	18	4	35																					35
37	Nick Kelly						17	10	15	14		32															32
38=	Adrian Deitz						9	26	7	20		31															31
38=	Cameron McConville						9	26	7	20		31															31
39	Daniel Stutterd						19	13	16	Ret		15	14	Ret		15											30
40	Ivan Capelli						13	9	14	Ret		26															26
41	Greg Taylor	Ret	10	Ret	10	26							Ret	DNS		0											26
42	Nathan Antunes	Ret	10	Ret	10	26																					26
43	Dean Canto	22	11	Ret	5	24																					24
44	Peter Edwards						21	19	20	13		22															22
45	Justin McMillan	11	Ret	DNS		15																					15
Invitational class cars ineligible for championship points
	Keith Wong	19	17	15		0																					0
	Hector Lester						DSQ	15	Ret	Ret		0															0
	Benny Simonsen						DSQ	15	Ret	Ret		0															0
	Michael O'Donnell	20	16	17		0	28	28	26	24		0															0
	Wayne Mack						25	20	23	19		0															0
	Matthew Turnbull						27	24	25	22		0															0
Pos	Driver	R1	R2	R3	QP	RP	R1	R2	R3	R4	QP	RP	R1	R2	QP	RP	R1	R2	R3	QP	RP	R1	R2	R3	QP	RP	Pts
Pos	Driver	ADE (South Australia)					ALB (Victoria (state))						BAR (Western Australia)				TOW (Queensland)					SAN (Victoria (state))					Pts

Colour	Result
Gold	Winner
Silver	Second place
Bronze	Third place
Green	Points classification
Blue	Non-points classification
Blue	Non-classified finish (NC)
Purple	Retired, not classified (Ret)
Red	Did not qualify (DNQ)
Red	Did not pre-qualify (DNPQ)
Black	Disqualified (DSQ)
White	Did not start (DNS)
White	Withdrew (WD)
White	Race cancelled (C)
Blank	Did not practice (DNP)
Blank	Did not arrive (DNA)
Blank	Excluded (EX)

Bold - Pole position
Italics - Fastest lap

== Australian Endurance Championship ==
=== Teams and drivers ===
Team	Vehicle	No.	Drivers	Class	Events
Ah Apartments	Audi R8 LMS	3	(New Zealand) Chris Pither	GT	1
Ah Apartments	Audi R8 LMS	3	(Australia) Ash Samadi	GT	1
GT Motorsport	Audi R8 LMS	5	(Australia) Grant Denyer	GT	2
GT Motorsport	Audi R8 LMS	5	(Australia) Greg Taylor	GT	2
Zagame Motorsport	Lamborghini Huracán GT3	6	(Australia) Adrian Deitz	GT	All
Zagame Motorsport	Lamborghini Huracán GT3	6	(Australia) Cameron McConville	GT	All
Darrell Lea/Keltic Racing	McLaren 650S GT3	7	(United Kingdom) Tony Quinn	GT	All
Darrell Lea/Keltic Racing	McLaren 650S GT3	7	(New Zealand) Mike Whiddett	GT	1
Darrell Lea/Keltic Racing	McLaren 650S GT3	7	(New Zealand) Jonny Reid	GT	2
Darrell Lea/Keltic Racing	McLaren 650S GT3	7	(New Zealand) Andrew Waite	GT	3–4
Darrell Lea/Keltic Racing	McLaren 650S GT3	77	(New Zealand) Shane van Gisbergen	GT	4
Darrell Lea/Keltic Racing	McLaren 650S GT3	77	(New Zealand) Mike Whiddett	GT	4
Scott Taylor Motorsport	Mercedes-AMG GT3	8	(Australia) Tony D'Alberto	GT	All
Scott Taylor Motorsport	Mercedes-AMG GT3	8	(Australia) Max Twigg	GT	All
Scott Taylor Motorsport	Porsche 911 GT3-R	22	(New Zealand) Craig Baird	GT	1
Scott Taylor Motorsport	Porsche 911 GT3-R	22	(Australia) Scott Taylor	GT	1
Scott Taylor Motorsport	Mercedes-AMG GT3	222	(New Zealand) Craig Baird	GT	2
Scott Taylor Motorsport	Mercedes-AMG GT3	222	(Australia) Scott Taylor	GT	2
Hog's Breath Cafe/Griffith Corporation	Mercedes-AMG GT3	19	(Australia) Mark Griffith	GT	All
Hog's Breath Cafe/Griffith Corporation	Mercedes-AMG GT3	19	(Australia) Jake Camilleri	GT	1
Hog's Breath Cafe/Griffith Corporation	Mercedes-AMG GT3	19	(Austria) Dominik Baumann	GT	2
Hog's Breath Cafe/Griffith Corporation	Mercedes-AMG GT3	19	(Australia) Scott Hookey	GT	3–4
International Motorsport	Audi R8 LMS Ultra	22	(New Zealand) Neil Foster	GT	3
International Motorsport	Audi R8 LMS Ultra	22	(New Zealand) Jonny Reid	GT	3
International Motorsport	Audi R8 LMS Ultra	36	(New Zealand) John Udy	GT	3
International Motorsport	Audi R8 LMS Ultra	36	(New Zealand) Matt Whittaker	GT	3
International Motorsport	Audi R8 LMS	82	(New Zealand) Andrew Bagnall	GT	3–4
International Motorsport	Audi R8 LMS	82	(New Zealand) Matt Halliday	GT	3–4
JBS Australia	Lamborghini Gallardo R-EX	23	(Australia) Roger Lago	GT	All
JBS Australia	Lamborghini Gallardo R-EX	23	(Australia) David Russell	GT	All
Trass Family Motorsport	Ferrari 458 GT3	27	(New Zealand) Andrew Fawcett	GT	3
Trass Family Motorsport	Ferrari 458 GT3	27	(New Zealand) Gene Rollinson	GT	3
Trofeo Motorsport	Lamborghini Huracán GT3	29	(Australia) Jim Manolios	GT	1–2
Trofeo Motorsport	Lamborghini Huracán GT3	29	(Australia) Ryan Millier	GT	1–2
M Motorsport	Lamborghini Gallardo R-EX	48	(Australia) Glen Wood	GT	1, 4
M Motorsport	Lamborghini Gallardo R-EX	48	(Australia) Peter Major	GT	1
M Motorsport	Lamborghini Gallardo R-EX	48	(Australia) Justin McMillan	GT	4
AMAC Motorsport	Lamborghini Huracán GT3	51	(Australia) Andrew MacPherson	GT	All
AMAC Motorsport	Lamborghini Huracán GT3	51	(Australia) Brad Shiels	GT	All
Tekno Autosports	McLaren 650S GT3	58	(Australia) Fraser Ross	GT	2–4
Tekno Autosports	McLaren 650S GT3	58	(Australia) Warren Luff	GT	2
Tekno Autosports	McLaren 650S GT3	58	(Portugal) Álvaro Parente	GT	3–4
Tekno Autosports	McLaren 650S GT3	59	(Australia) Warren Luff	GT	1
Tekno Autosports	McLaren 650S GT3	59	(Australia) Fraser Ross	GT	1
Eggleston Motorsport	Mercedes-AMG GT3	63	(Australia) Peter Hackett	GT	All
Eggleston Motorsport	Mercedes-AMG GT3	63	(New Zealand) Dominic Storey	GT	All
JAMEC PEM Racing	Audi R8 LMS	74	(Australia) Geoff Emery	GT	1–2
JAMEC PEM Racing	Audi R8 LMS	74	(Australia) Garth Tander	GT	1
JAMEC PEM Racing	Audi R8 LMS	74	(South Africa) Kelvin van der Linde	GT	2
JAMEC PEM Racing	Audi R8 LMS	75	(New Zealand) Jaxon Evans	GT	All
JAMEC PEM Racing	Audi R8 LMS	75	(New Zealand) Tim Miles	GT	All
Maranello Motorsport	Ferrari 488 GT3	88	(Australia) Peter Edwards	GT	1–2
Maranello Motorsport	Ferrari 488 GT3	88	(New Zealand) Graeme Smyth	GT	1–2
BMW Team SRM	BMW M6 GT3	100	(New Zealand) Steven Richards	GT	All
BMW Team SRM	BMW M6 GT3	100	(Australia) James Bergmuller	GT	1–2
BMW Team SRM	BMW M6 GT3	100	(Australia) Dylan O'Keeffe	GT	3–4
DJS Racing	BMW M6 GT3	101	(New Zealand) Sam Fillmore	GT	1
DJS Racing	BMW M6 GT3	101	(Australia) Danny Stutterd	GT	1
KFC Racing	Audi R8 LMS	124	(New Zealand) Daniel Gaunt	GT	1–2
KFC Racing	Audi R8 LMS	124	(Australia) Matt Stoupas	GT	1
KFC Racing	Audi R8 LMS	124	(Australia) Dylan O’Keeffe	GT	2
Walkinshaw Racing	Porsche 911 GT3-R	911	(Australia) John Martin	GT	All
Walkinshaw Racing	Porsche 911 GT3-R	911	(Australia) Liam Talbot	GT	All

Class	Meaning
GT	Australian GT Championship
GT-I	Australian GT Championship (Invitational Class)

=== Race results ===
Round	Circuit	Pole position	Race winner
1	Phillip Island	No. 63 Eggleston Motorsport	No. 75 JAMEC PEM Racing
1	Phillip Island	(Australia) Peter Hackett (New Zealand) Dominic Storey	(New Zealand) Jaxon Evans (New Zealand) Tim Miles
2	Sydney	No. 911 Walkinshaw Racing	No. 75 JAMEC PEM Racing
2	Sydney	(Australia) John Martin (Australia) Liam Talbot	(New Zealand) Jaxon Evans (New Zealand) Tim Miles
3	Hampton Downs	No. 911 Walkinshaw Racing	No. 63 Eggleston Motorsport
3	Hampton Downs	(Australia) John Martin (Australia) Liam Talbot	(Australia) Peter Hackett (New Zealand) Dominic Storey
4	Highlands	No. 911 Walkinshaw Racing	No. 8 Scott Taylor Motorsport
4	Highlands	(Australia) Peter Hackett (New Zealand) Dominic Storey	(Australia) Tony D'Alberto (Australia) Max Twigg

=== Points system ===
Points are awarded as follows:

Position	**1st**	**2nd**	**3rd**	**4th**	**5th**	**6th**	**7th**	**8th**	**9th**	**10th**	**11th**	**12th**	**13th**	**14th**	**15th**	**16th**	**17th**	**18th**	**19th**	**20th**	**21st**	**22nd**	**23rd**	**24th+**
Qualifying session	10	8	7	6	5	4	3	2	1															
Rounds 1, 3	180	159	138	117	114	108	99	90	86	81	77	72	68	63	59	54	50	45	41	36	27	18	9	5
Rounds 2, 4	220	197	174	153	146	132	121	110	105	99	94	88	83	77	72	66	61	55	50	44	33	22	11	6

=== Championship standings ===
Pos	Driver	PHI (Victoria (state))			SMP (New South Wales)			HAM (New Zealand)			HIG (New Zealand)			Pts
Pos	Driver	R	QP	RP	R	QP	RP	R	QP	RP	R	QP	RP	Pts
1	Peter Hackett; Dominic Storey	2	16	175	6	13	145	1	10	190	6	18	150	660
2	Jaxon Evans; Tim Miles	1	8	188	1	8	228	2	11	170	Ret	12	12	598
3	John Martin; Liam Talbot	6	12	120	2	15	212	4	20	137	Ret	11	11	480
4	Tony D'Alberto; Max Twigg	10	8	89	Ret	12	12	3	5	143	1	12	232	476
5	Tony Quinn	14		63	12		88	5	1	115	2	1	198	464
6	Adrian Deitz; Cameron McConville	8	2	92	8		110	11	2	79	3	0	174	455
7	Fraser Ross	3		138	9	8	113	6	16	124	Ret	11	11	386
8	Andrew MacPherson; Brad Shiels	15		59	10		99	8	5	95	7		121	374
9	Mark Griffith	5		114	7		121	Ret		0	8		110	345
10	Geoff Emery	4	12	129	3	14	188							317
11	Andrew Waite							5	1	115	2	1	198	313
12	Roger Lago; David Russell	9	13	99	DNS	5	5	DNS		0	5	5	151	255
13	Peter Edwards; Graeme Smyth	7	8	107	5		146							253
14	Warren Luff	3		138	9	8	113							251
15	Daniel Gaunt	12		72	4	8	161							233
16	Kelvin van der Linde				3	14	188							188
17	Andrew Bagnall; Matt Halliday							10		81	9	1	106	187
18	Dylan O'Keeffe				4	8	161	Ret	10	10	Ret	12	12	183
19	Jonny Reid				12		88	9	9	95				183
20	Jim Manolios; Ryan Millier	11		77	11		94							171
21	Steven Richards	17	2	52	13	4	87	Ret	10	10	Ret	12	12	161
22	Glen Wood	Ret	6	6							4		153	159
23	Justin McMillan										4		153	153
24	James Bergmuller	17	2	52	13	4	87							139
25	Álvaro Parente							6	16	124	Ret	11	11	135
26	Garth Tander	4	12	129										129
27	Dominik Baumann				7		121							121
28	Jake Camilleri	5		114										114
29	Scott Hookey							Ret		0	8		110	110
30	John Udy; Matt Whittaker							7	3	102				102
31	Neil Foster							9	9	95				95
32	Matt Stoupas	12		72										72
33	Mike Whiddett	14		63							Ret		9	72
34	Sam Fillmore; Dan Stutterd	13		68										68
35	Chris Pither; Ash Samadi	16	4	58										58
36	Shane van Gisbergen										Ret		9	9
37	Craig Baird; Scott Taylor	Ret	1	1	Ret	5	5							6
38	Peter Major	Ret	6	6										6
39	Grant Denyer; Greg Taylor				Ret		0							0
Pos	Driver	R	QP	RP	R	QP	RP	R	QP	RP	R	QP	RP	Pts
Pos	Driver	PHI (Victoria (state))			SMP (New South Wales)			HAM (New Zealand)			HIG (New Zealand)			Pts

Colour	Result
Gold	Winner
Silver	Second place
Bronze	Third place
Green	Points classification
Blue	Non-points classification
Blue	Non-classified finish (NC)
Purple	Retired, not classified (Ret)
Red	Did not qualify (DNQ)
Red	Did not pre-qualify (DNPQ)
Black	Disqualified (DSQ)
White	Did not start (DNS)
White	Withdrew (WD)
White	Race cancelled (C)
Blank	Did not practice (DNP)
Blank	Did not arrive (DNA)
Blank	Excluded (EX)

Bold - Pole position
Italics - Fastest lap

== Australian GT Trophy Series ==
The Australian GT Trophy Series was won by Steve McLaughlan driving an Audi R8 LMS Ultra.
