= 2016 Highlands 101 =

2016 Endurance race at Highlands Motorsport Park

Seasons
- ← 2015 2017 →

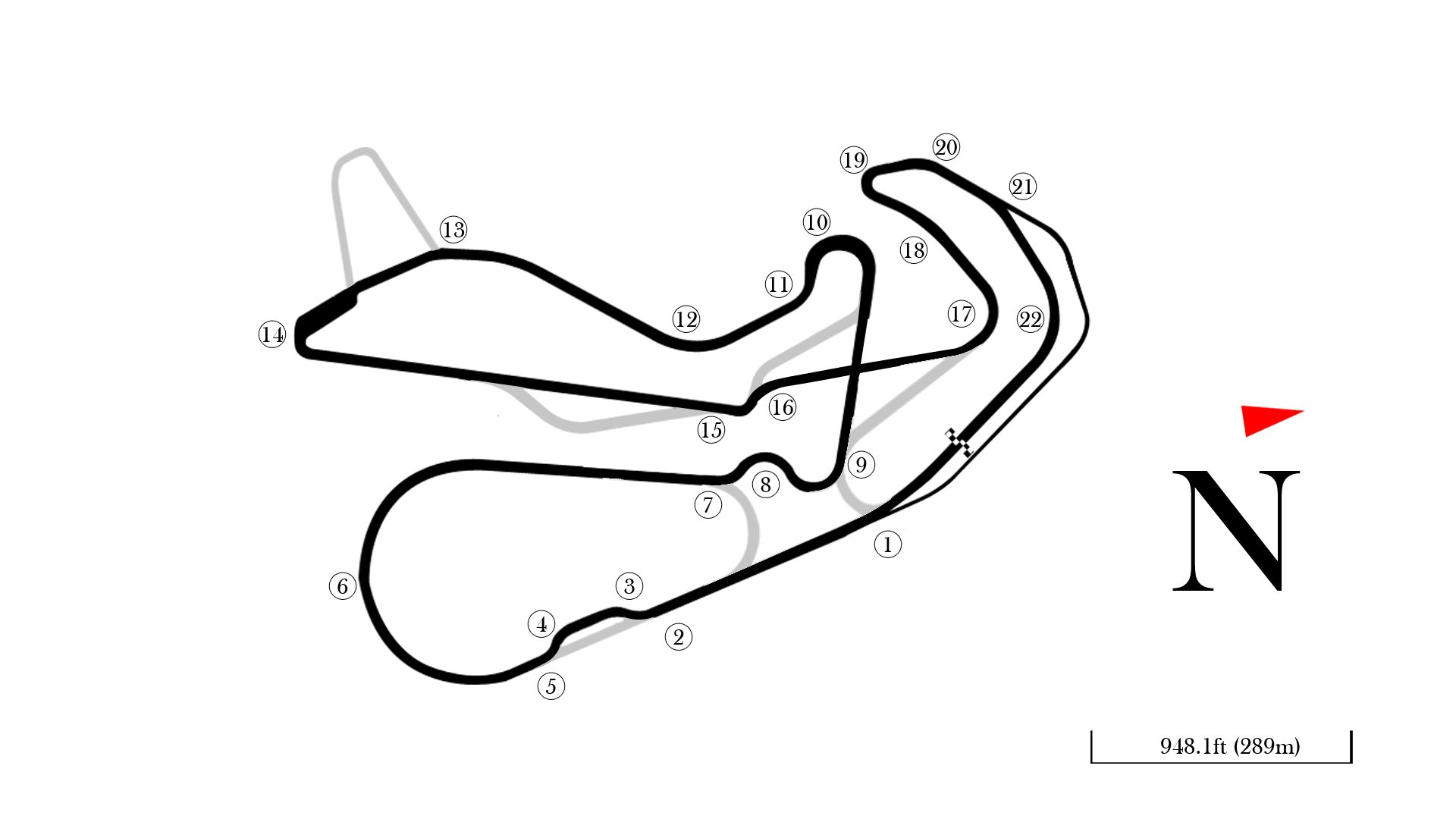

The 2016 Highlands 101 was an endurance race staged at the Highlands Motorsport Park, near Cromwell, in Otago, New Zealand on 13 November 2016. It was the fourth running of the Highlands 101. It was also the final round of the Australian GT Championship.

The race, which took place on the full, 22 turn, 4.100 km (2.548 mi) Highlands Park circuit, was won by Michael Almond and Craig Baird, driving the Scott Taylor Motorsport-owned Mercedes-AMG GT3.

== Official results ==
Pos.	No.	Team / Entrant	Drivers	Car	Laps
1	222	Scott Taylor Motorsport	(Australia) Michael Almond (New Zealand) Craig Baird	Mercedes-AMG GT3	101
2	7	Darrell Lea	(United Kingdom) Tony Quinn (New Zealand) Greg Murphy	Aston Martin Vantage GT3	101
3	96	Miedecke Motor Group	(Australia) Andrew Miedecke (Australia) George Miedecke	Aston Martin Vantage GT3	101
4	2	JAMEC PEM Racing	(Australia) Stephen McLaughlin (Australia) Garth Tander	Audi R8 LMS Ultra	101
5	63	Eggleston Motorsport	(Australia) Peter Hackett (New Zealand) Dominic Storey	Mercedes-AMG GT3	101
6	48	M Motorsport	(Australia) Justin McMillan (Australia) Glen Wood	Lamborghini Gallardo R-EX	101
7	8	Maranello Motorsport	(Australia) Adrian Deitz (Australia) Cameron McConville	Ferrari 458 GT3	100
8	59	Tekno Autosports	(Australia) Grant Denyer (Australia) Nathan Morcom	McLaren 650S GT3	99
9	27	Trass Family Motorsport	(New Zealand) Sam Fillmore (New Zealand) Danny Stutterd	Ferrari 458 GT3	99
10	51	AMAC Motorsport	(Australia) Andrew Macpherson (Australia) Brad Shiels	Porsche 997 GT3-R	99
11	88	Maranello Motorsport	(Australia) Peter Edwards (Australia) John Bowe	Ferrari 488 GT3	99
12	3	Team ASR	(Australia) Ash Samadi (Australia) Tony D'Alberto	Audi R8 LMS	98
13	5	Adina Apartment Hotels	(Australia) Greg Taylor (Australia) Nathan Antunes	Audi R8 LMS	96
14	123	Nick Chester Racing	(New Zealand) Nick Chester (New Zealand) Glenn Smith	Chevrolet Camaro GT3	96
15	6	Skwirk Online Education	(Australia) Liam Talbot (Australia) Jake Fouracre	Audi R8 LMS Ultra	89
Ret	4	Supabarn Supermarkets	(Australia) Theo Koundouris (Australia) Marcus Marshall	Audi R8 LMS	97
Ret	30	Clark Proctor Racing	(New Zealand) Clark Proctor (New Zealand) Andrew Porter	Nissan GT-R Nismo GT3	79
Ret	19	Griffith Corporation	(Australia) Mark Griffith (Australia) Shae Davies	Mercedes-AMG GT3	76
Ret	37	Darrell Lea	(Australia) Klark Quinn (New Zealand) "Mad" Mike Whiddett	McLaren 650S GT3	36
Ret	60	DPO	(France) Côme Ledogar (Australia) Matt Kingsley	McLaren 650S GT3	35
Ret	1	JAMEC PEM Racing	(Germany) Christopher Mies (Australia) Tony Bates	Audi R8 LMS	33
Ret	33	HBS Motorsports	(New Zealand) Simon Ellingham (New Zealand) Tim Miles	Audi R8 LMS Ultra	31
Ret	73	Triffid Bar Venue	(Australia) Michael Hovey (New Zealand) Jaxon Evans	Lamborghini Gallardo R-EX	27
