= Highlands Motorsport Park =

Motor racing circuit in Cromwell, New Zealand

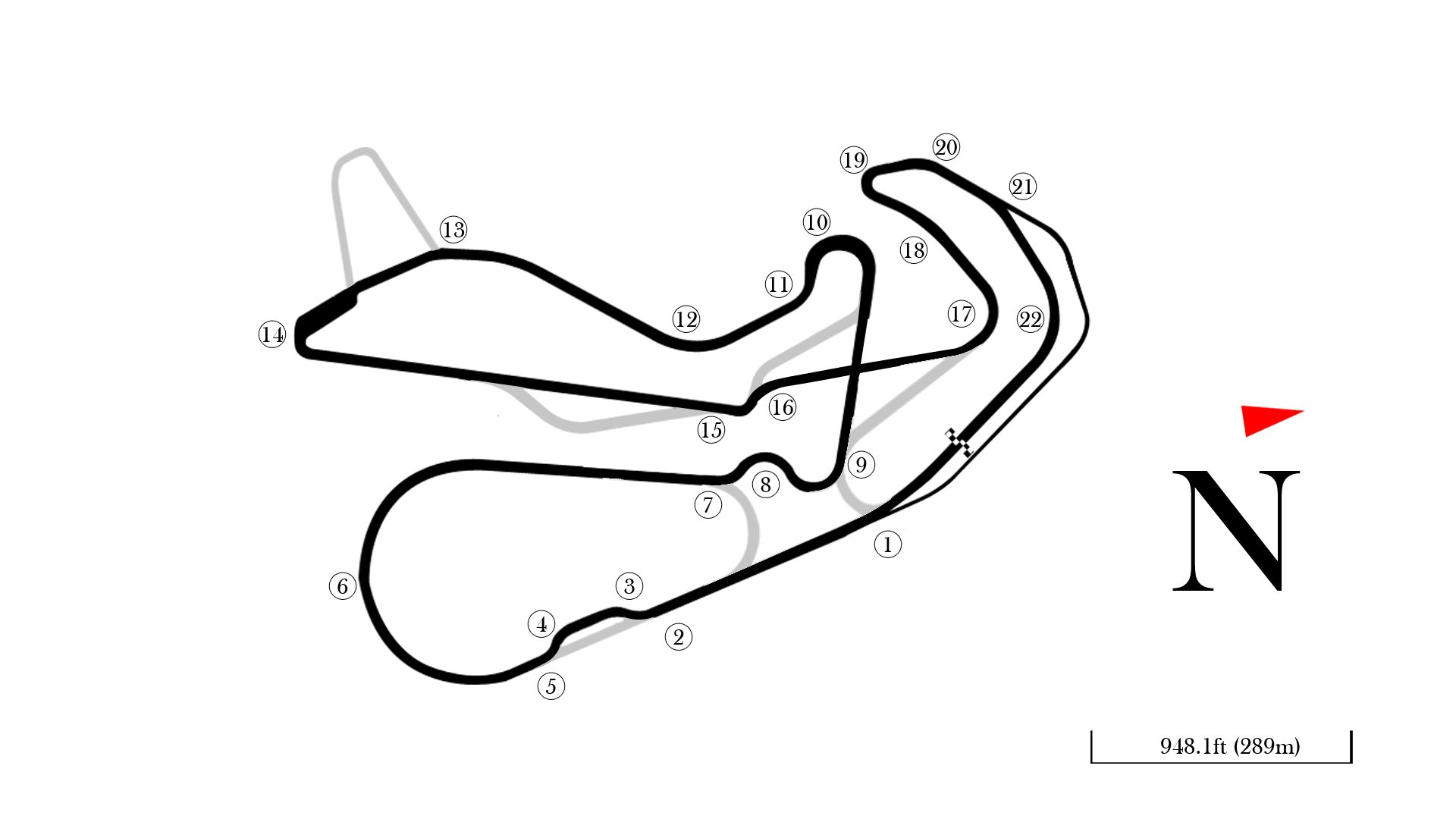
- Full Circuit (2013–present)
- Location: Cromwell, Otago
- Coordinates: 45°03′26″S 169°09′52″E
- FIA Grade: 3
- Owner: Tony Quinn
- Broke ground: April 2012; 14 years ago
- Opened: 30 March 2013; 13 years ago
- Major events: Current: FR Oceania (2014, 2019–2020, 2023–present); New Zealand Grand Prix (2024–present); GR86 Championship New Zealand (2013, 2019–2020, 2022, 2024–present); Former: Australian GT Highlands 101 (2013–2016); Aussie Racing Cars (2015, 2023); TCR New Zealand (2021); Racer Products V8s (2019); V8SuperTourer (2014)
- Website: http://www.highlands.co.nz

Full Circuit (2013–present)
- Length: 4.100 km (2.548 mi)
- Turns: 22
- Race lap record: 1:28.830 ( (New Zealand) Liam Sceats, Tatuus FT-60, 2024, F-Regional)

'A' Course (2013–present)
- Length: 1.133 km (0.704 mi)
- Turns: 7

'B' Course (2013–present)
- Length: 1.090 km (0.677 mi)
- Turns: 2

'C' Course (2013–present)
- Length: 1.496 km (0.930 mi)
- Turns: 7

The Highlands Motorsport Park is a motor racing circuit in Cromwell, Otago, New Zealand. Opened on 30 March 2013, the facility features a 4.100 km (2.548 mi) circuit.

== Circuit ==
The circuit offers on and off track driving, an outdoor go-kart track, a sculpture park and mini golf. It is also the home of the New Zealand National Motorsport Museum, and displays machinery including ex-Formula One cars.

In early 2016, Highlands acquired the only Aston Martin Vulcan in the Southern Hemisphere, and one of only 24 worldwide, for $4.2 million. It is currently on display at the National Motorsport Museum at the park. In 2016 the park introduced the Highlands Festival of Speed, held annually in mid-January.

The entire Highlands complex is next door to the Central Motor Speedway, a ¼ mile (446 m (488 yd)) dirt track, egg shaped oval speedway that opened in December 1980.

== Layout configurations ==
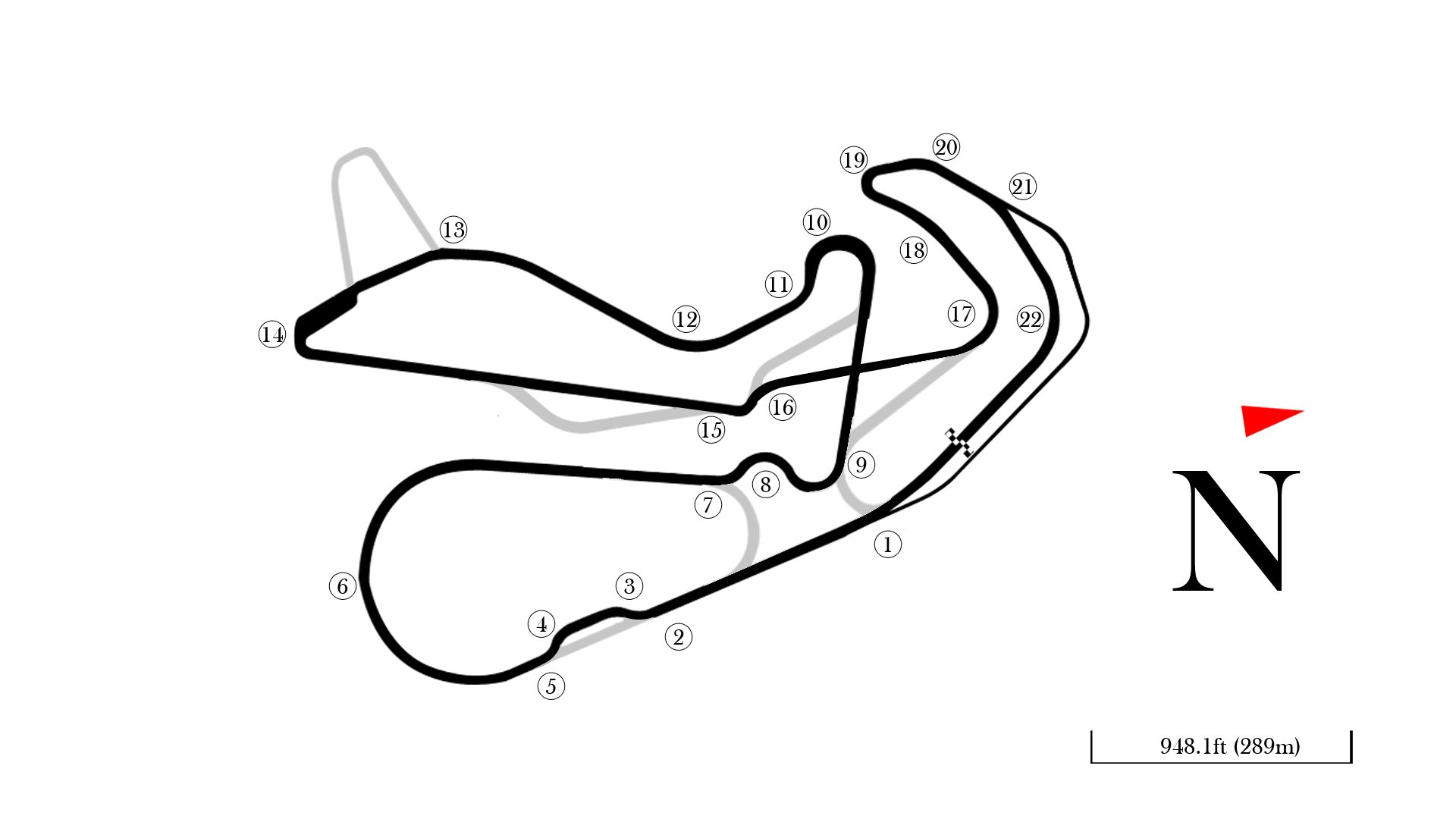
(Full Course)

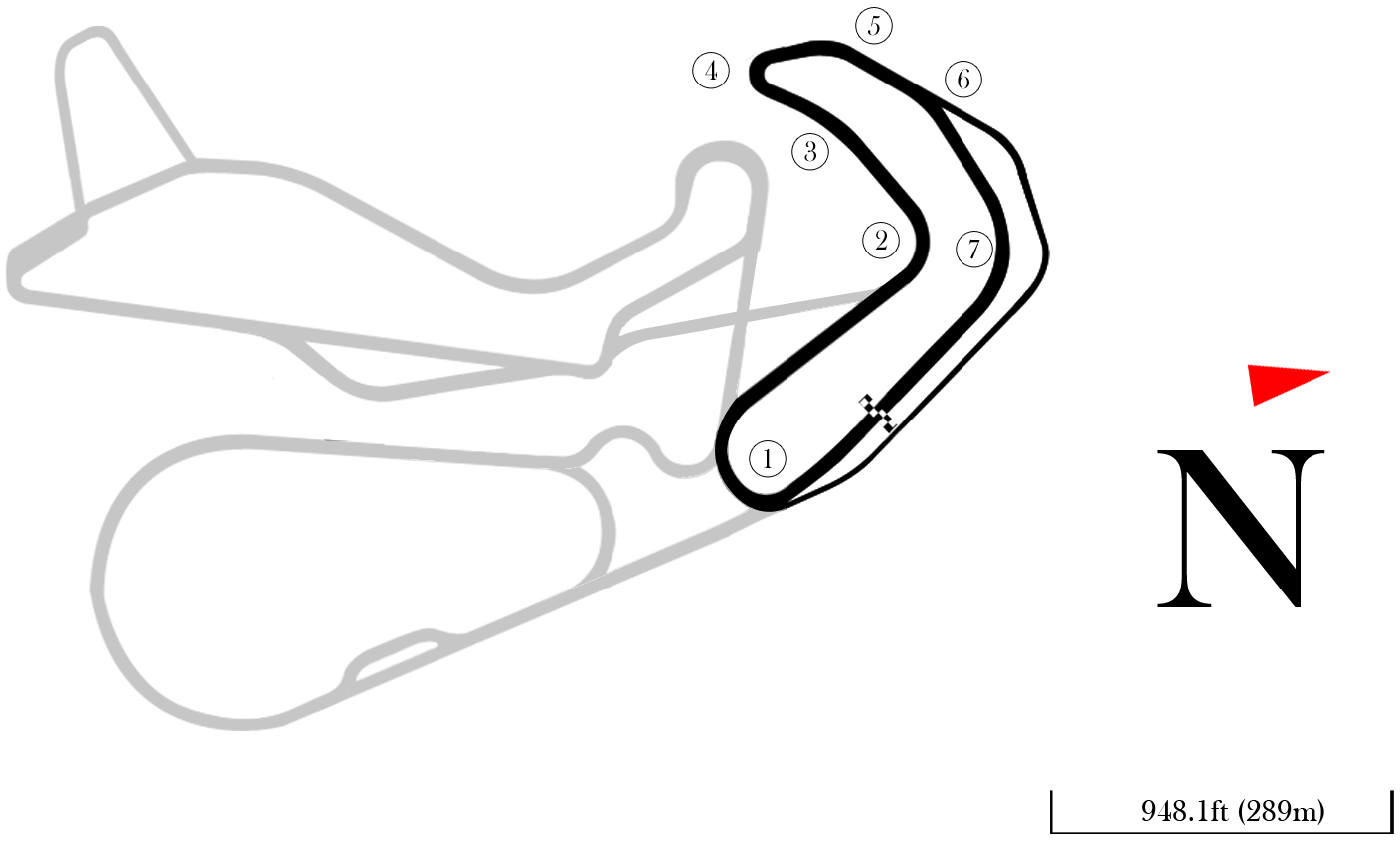
('A' Course)

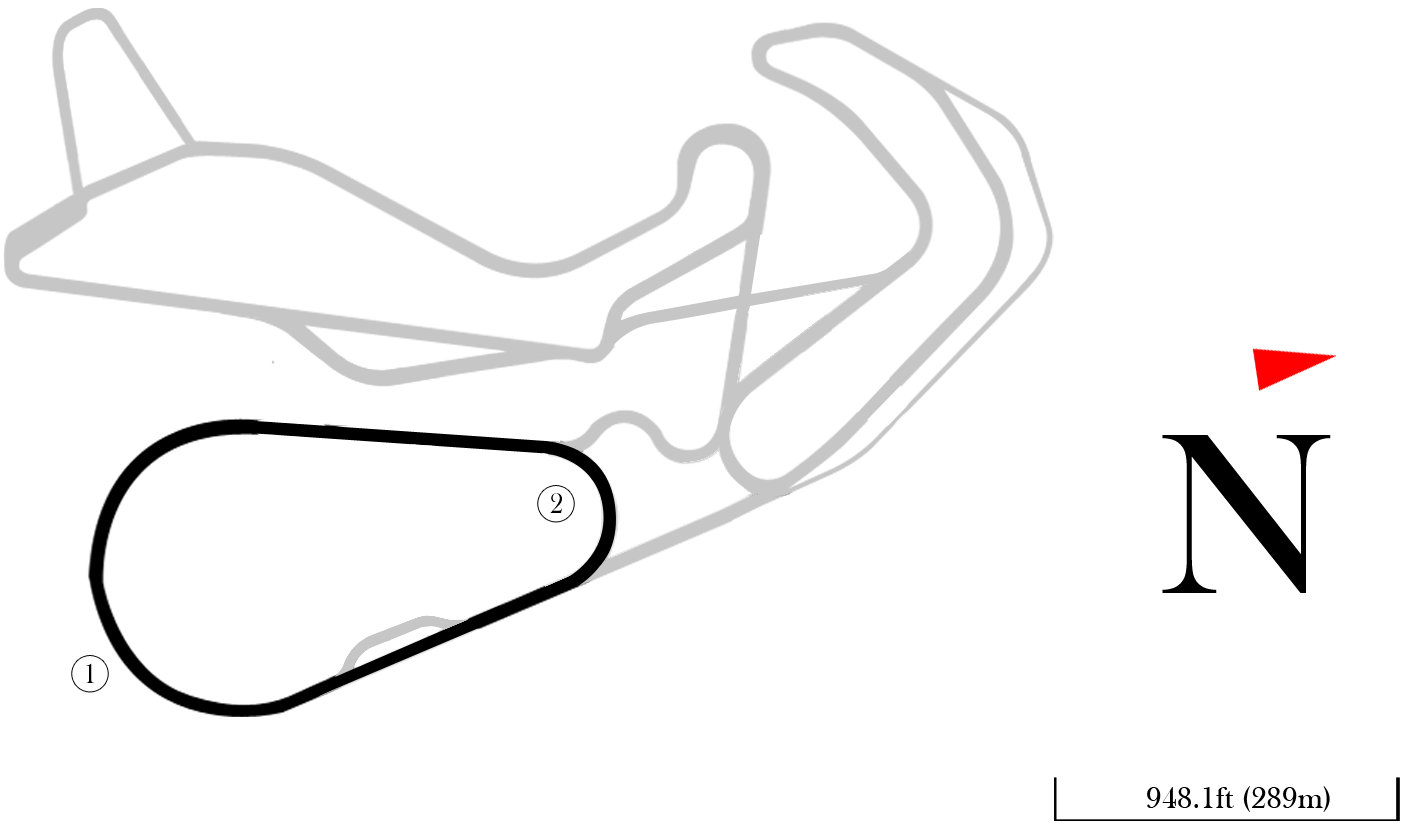
('B' Course)

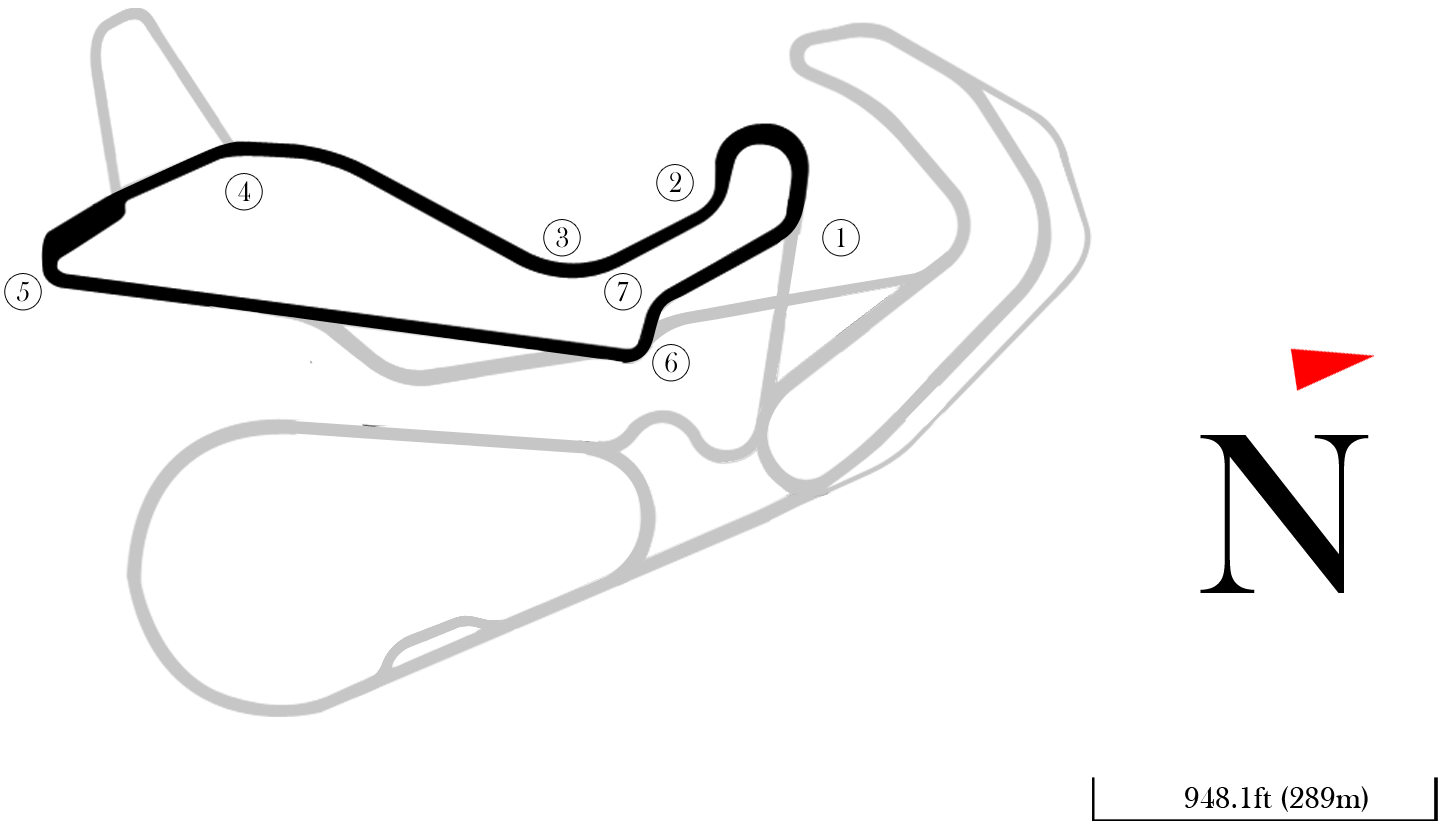
('C' Course)

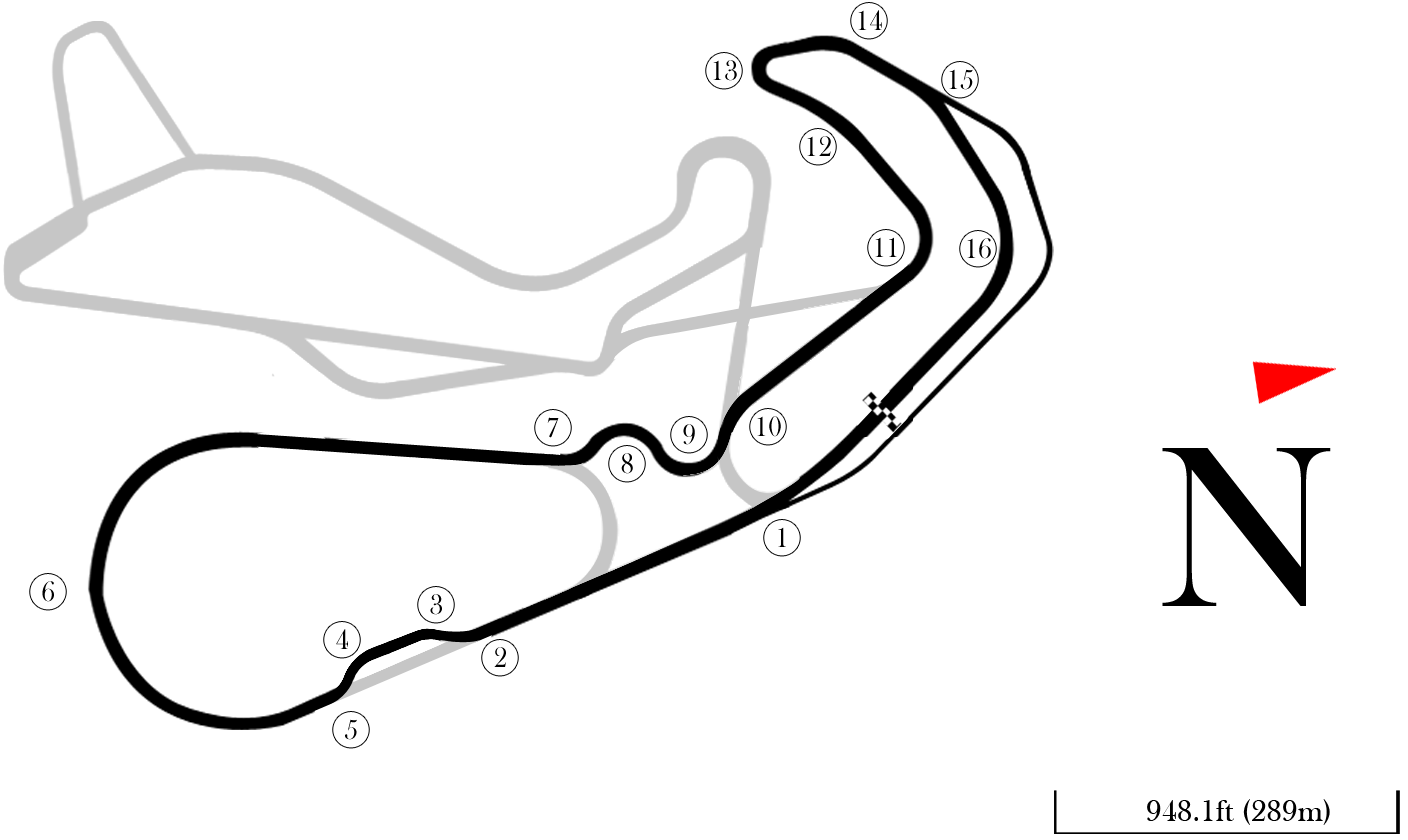
('D' Course)

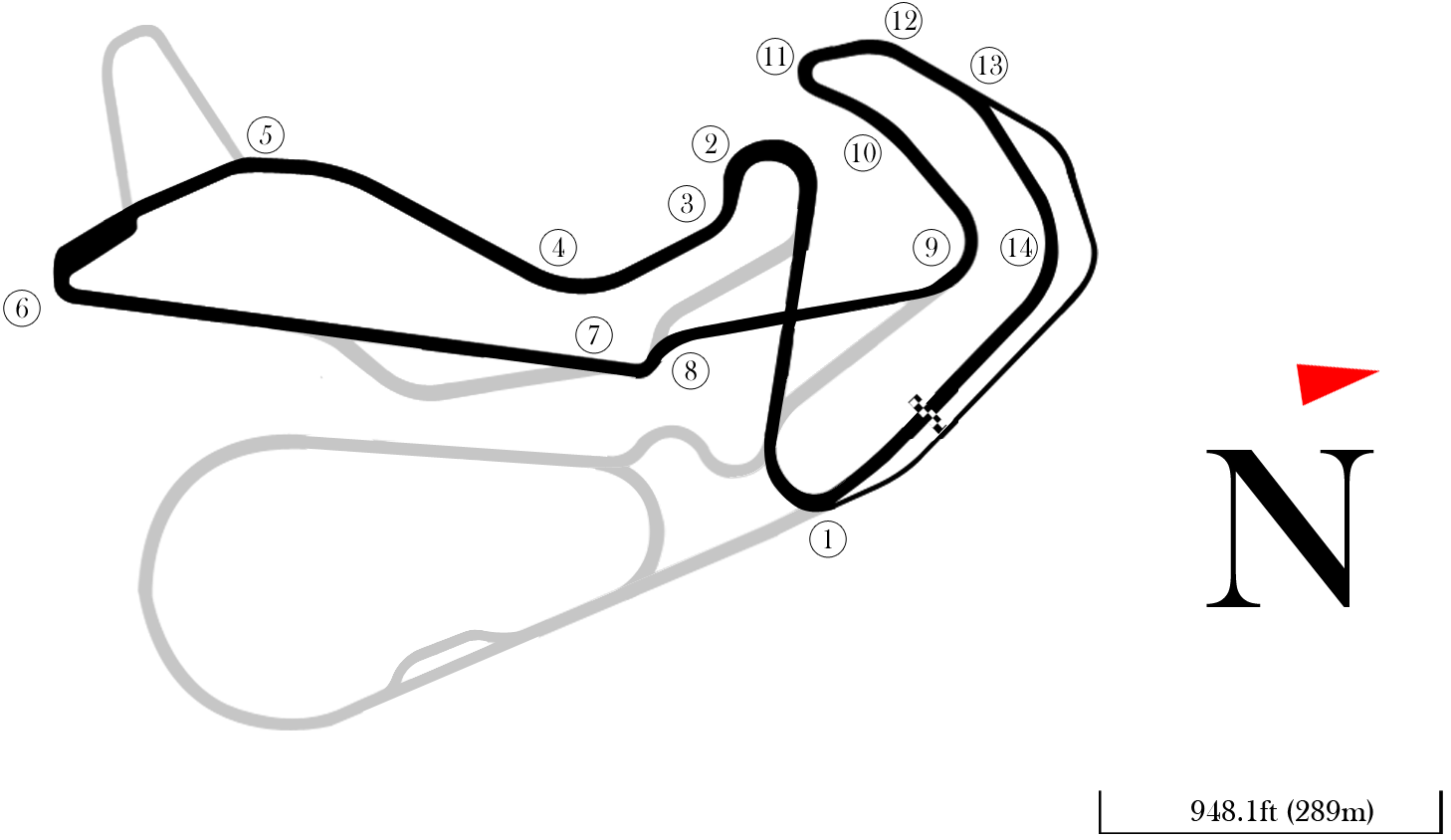
('E' Course)

== Highlands 101 ==
The Highlands 101 was an endurance race held annually at the Highlands Motorsport Park from 2013 to 2016, in conjunction with the final round of the Australian GT Championship.

=== Past winners ===
Year	Drivers	Entrant	Car	Report
2013	(United Kingdom) Tony Quinn (New Zealand) Fabian Coulthard	VIP Holdings	Aston Martin Vantage GT3	Report
2014	(United Kingdom) Tony Quinn (Australia) Garth Tander	VIP Holdings	Aston Martin Vantage GT3	Report
2015	(Australia) Klark Quinn (New Zealand) Shane van Gisbergen	VIP Holdings	McLaren 650S GT3	Report
2016	(New Zealand) Craig Baird (Australia) Michael Almond	Scott Taylor Motorsport	Mercedes-AMG GT3	Report

== Lap records ==
The unofficial all-time track record is 1:23.753, set by Liam Lawson, driving a Rodin FZED, on 16 January 2022. As of February 2026, the fastest official race lap records at the Highlands Motorsport Park are listed as:

Category	Time	Driver	Vehicle	Date
Full Circuit: 4.100 km (2.548 mi) (2013–present)
Formula Regional	1:28.830	(New Zealand) Liam Sceats	Tatuus FT-60	17 February 2024
Toyota Racing Series	1:28.910	(New Zealand) Liam Lawson	Tatuus FT-50	12 January 2019
GT3	1:31.365	(New Zealand) Craig Baird	Mercedes-AMG GT3	12 November 2016
TA2	1:39.919	(Australia) Nathan Herne	Dodge Challenger	18 February 2024
Toyota GR86 Championship	1:50.836	(New Zealand) Arthur Broughan	Toyota GR86	1 February 2026
'E' Course: 2.910 km (1.808 mi) (2013–present)
TCR Touring Car	1:12.483	(New Zealand) Chris van der Drift	Audi RS 3 LMS TCR	23 April 2021
