= Highlands 101 =

Endurance motor race

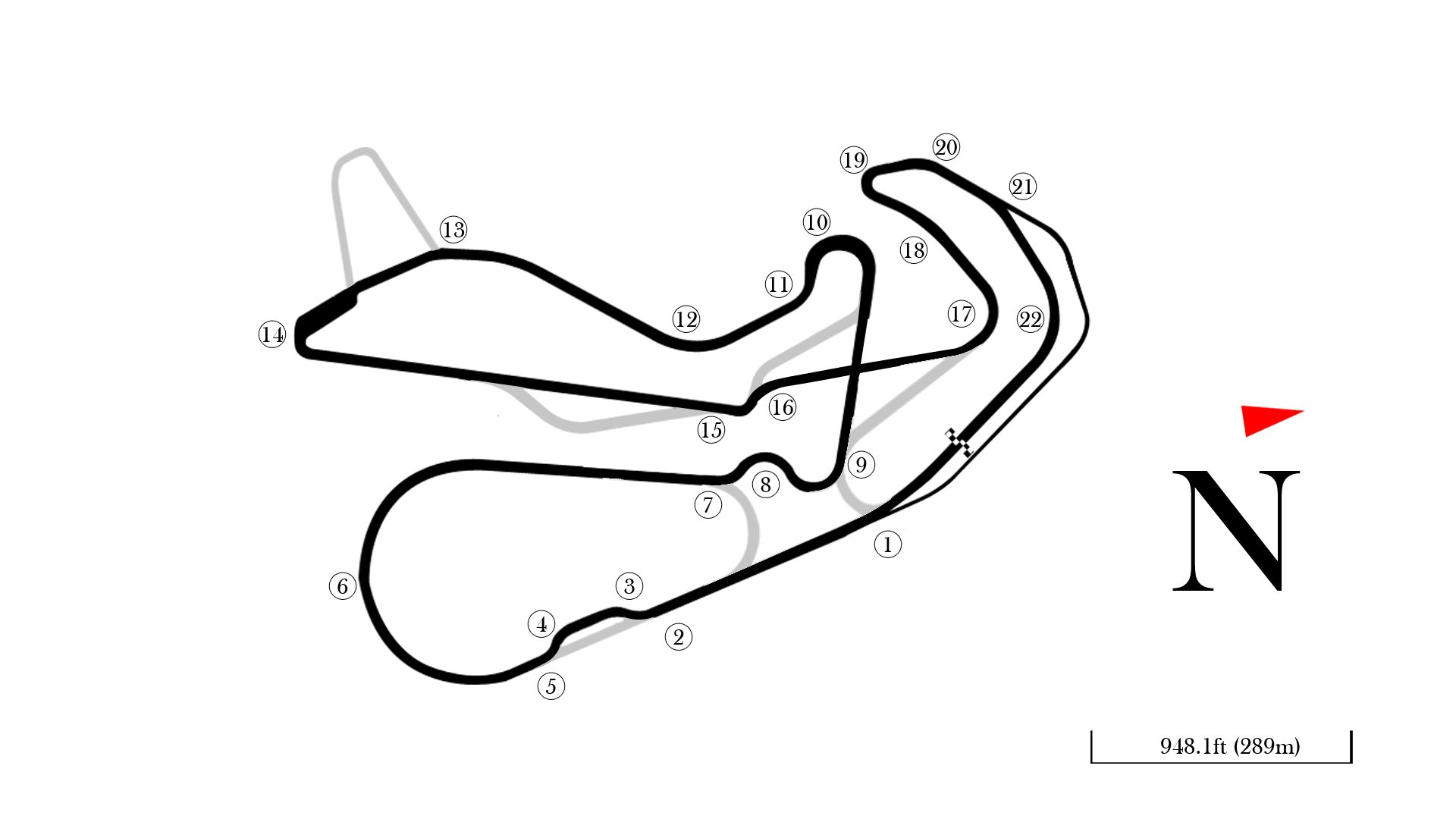
- Venue: Highlands Motorsport Park
- First race: 2013
- Duration: 414 km (257 mi)
- Most wins (driver): Tony Quinn (2)
- Most wins (manufacturer): Aston Martin (2)

The Highlands 101 is an endurance motor race which is held at Highlands Motorsport Park near Cromwell, New Zealand. The race for GT cars was established in 2013 as the showpiece event for the newly opened racetrack. The race runs for 101 laps of the 4.1 km circuit for a total race distance of 414 km (257 miles). From 2016, the race is run as a round of the Australian Endurance Championship.

== Background ==
The race attracts a large field of cars from Australia and New Zealand. The final round of the Australian GT Championship is held each year on the Saturday of the Highlands 101 race weekend, ensuring a large field of Australian racing teams as well as New Zealand teams who enter independent of the Australian series entry. Since 2016, the race is also a part of the Australian Endurance Championship. The Highlands 101 itself is run on the Sunday of the race weekend. The South Island Endurance Series also provides entries to the race. The race is held in November each year to maximise the potential for favourable weather conditions and the maximise the number of Australian race team to enter the event.

The race meeting also includes the Highlands 1+01, 1 hour plus 1 lap, for domestic New Zealand GT racing teams and the Highlands 10+1 which features three races of 11 (10+1) laps for the New Zealand Euromarque category.

The race features a variation of the traditional Le Mans start. The car is parked in traditional Le Mans formation, while co-drivers are positioned about 250 meters from the circuit, and must run to their car parked on pit lane. Once there, the co-driver pulls the flag from the car, and the primary driver is allowed to leave. The cars are parked on pit lane, and the pit lane speed limit will be in effect until the car leaves pit lane.

== History ==
The first two years of the event were won by the circuit's owner, Scottish-Australian businessman Tony Quinn. Quinn, driving for his VIP Holdings team, was in each year co-driving with a professional V8 Supercars driver; Fabian Coulthard in 2013 and Garth Tander in 2014. The 2014 event was particularly dramatic with Tander charging through the field in the closing laps, resetting the lap record on the penultimate lap. The race-leading Erebus Motorsport Mercedes-Benz SLS AMG GT3 of Richard Muscat ran out of fuel on the last lap of the race, giving the win to Quinn and Tander. In 2015, Erebus Motorsport was again leading late in the race, this time until the Jack Le Brocq and Morgan Haber Mercedes-Benz was overtaken by the second VIP Holdings McLaren 650S GT3 of Shane van Gisbergen and Klark Quinn (son of Tony) with two laps remaining. 2016 saw Scott Taylor Motorsport take out the event, albeit without their eponymous team owner who missed the race injured.

== Winners ==
| Year | Drivers | Entrant | Car |
|---|---|---|---|
| 2013 | (United Kingdom) Tony Quinn (New Zealand) Fabian Coulthard | VIP Holdings | Aston Martin Vantage GT3 |
| 2014 | (United Kingdom) Tony Quinn (Australia) Garth Tander | VIP Holdings | Aston Martin Vantage GT3 |
| 2015 | (Australia) Klark Quinn (New Zealand) Shane van Gisbergen | VIP Holdings | McLaren 650S GT3 |
| 2016 | (New Zealand) Craig Baird (Australia) Michael Almond | Scott Taylor Motorsport | Mercedes-AMG GT3 |

== Multiple winners ==
=== By driver ===
| Wins | Driver | Years |
|---|---|---|
| 2 | (United Kingdom) Tony Quinn | 2013, 2014 |

=== By manufacturer ===
| Wins | Manufacturer | Years |
|---|---|---|
| 2 | (United Kingdom) Aston Martin | 2013, 2014 |

=== By Entrant ===
| Wins | Entrant | Years |
|---|---|---|
| 3 | (Australia) VIP Holdings | 2013, 2014, 2015 |
