= Ava Dobson =

American racing driver (born 2008)

- Dobson at the 2026 Dutch Grand Prix
- Nationality: (United States) American
- Born: June 9, 2008 (age 18) Milwaukee, Wisconsin, U.S.

F1 Academy career
- Debut season: 2025
- Current team: Hitech
- Car number: 55
- Former teams: Hitech TGR
- Starts: 13
- Wins: 0
- Podiums: 0
- Poles: 0
- Fastest laps: 0
- Best finish: 23rd in 2025

Previous series
- 2025; 2024–2025; 2023–2024; 2023; 2023: F4 Saudi Arabian; GB4; USF Juniors; Formula 4 United States; USF2000
- Statistics up to date as of 13 November 2026.

Ava Dobson (born June 9, 2008) is an American racing driver who competes in F1 Academy for Hitech with support from American Express.

Dobson previously competed in the 2025 GB4 Championship for Arden Motorsport. She also previously drove for Velocity Racing Development in the 2024 GB4 Championship.

== Racing career ==
Dobson began karting at the age of seven.

=== Formula 4 United States Championship ===
After being one of five female drivers awarded with the Parella Motorsports Holdings Powering Diversity Scholarship in 2023, Dobson made her car racing debut in the 2023 Formula 4 United States Championship driving for Jay Howard Driver Development. She joined for the third round of the championship, the first after her fifteenth birthday, following an extensive testing program. She finished 31st in the championship with a best finish of 11th.

=== USF Juniors ===
==== 2023 ====
Towards the latter part of the 2023 USF Juniors season, Jay Howard Driver Development entered the series; Dobson joined them for their first round at Road America. She had a best result of 11th in race three and finished 16th in the championship.

==== 2024 ====
On September 22, 2023, Dobson announced that she would be returning to USF Juniors to run a full season in 2024 with Jay Howard Driver Development. In race one at the second round at Barber Motorsports Park, Dobson suffered a high speed accident in which she collided head on with Bruno Ribeiro. Dobson suffered injuries to her chest, back, and pinkie finger. She also suffered a severe concussion, which caused sickness while training. As a result of this crash, Dobson was not cleared to race for the remainder of the round, and she did not return to the championship.

=== GB4 Championship ===
==== 2024 ====
In July 2024, Dobson announced that she would make her debut in the 2024 GB4 Championship at the second Silverstone round driving for VRD Racing. This would mark her return to racing following her crash at Barber Motorsports Park. She took a best result of ninth in race two at Silverstone, recovering well from a stall on the grid. She finished the season in 17th place overall.

==== 2025 ====
Dobson returned to the championship for the full 2025 season, switching teams to Arden Motorsport alongside Leon Wilson. She took her first top-ten finish of the season in race two at Donington Park, finishing tenth, and improved her best finishing position to eighth in race one at Oulton Park. In the final round, Dobson claimed her maiden podium, finishing in third place, and she also won the Top Female Driver prize ahead of Megan Bruce.

=== F1 Academy ===
==== 2025 ====
On April 29, 2025, it was announced that Dobson would be the wildcard driver for the Miami round of the 2025 F1 Academy season. She would compete for Hitech TGR with Morgan Stanley as the car's sponsor. She started race one from the back of the grid, having been given a three-place penalty for colliding with Lia Block in free practice two. However, she avoided incidents in the race to finish thirteenth, the season-best result for a wildcard driver. Race two was cancelled due to adverse weather conditions. It was rescheduled to take place in Montreal, but Dobson was unable to return, as participating in more than one round counts towards the two-season entry limit.

==== 2026 ====
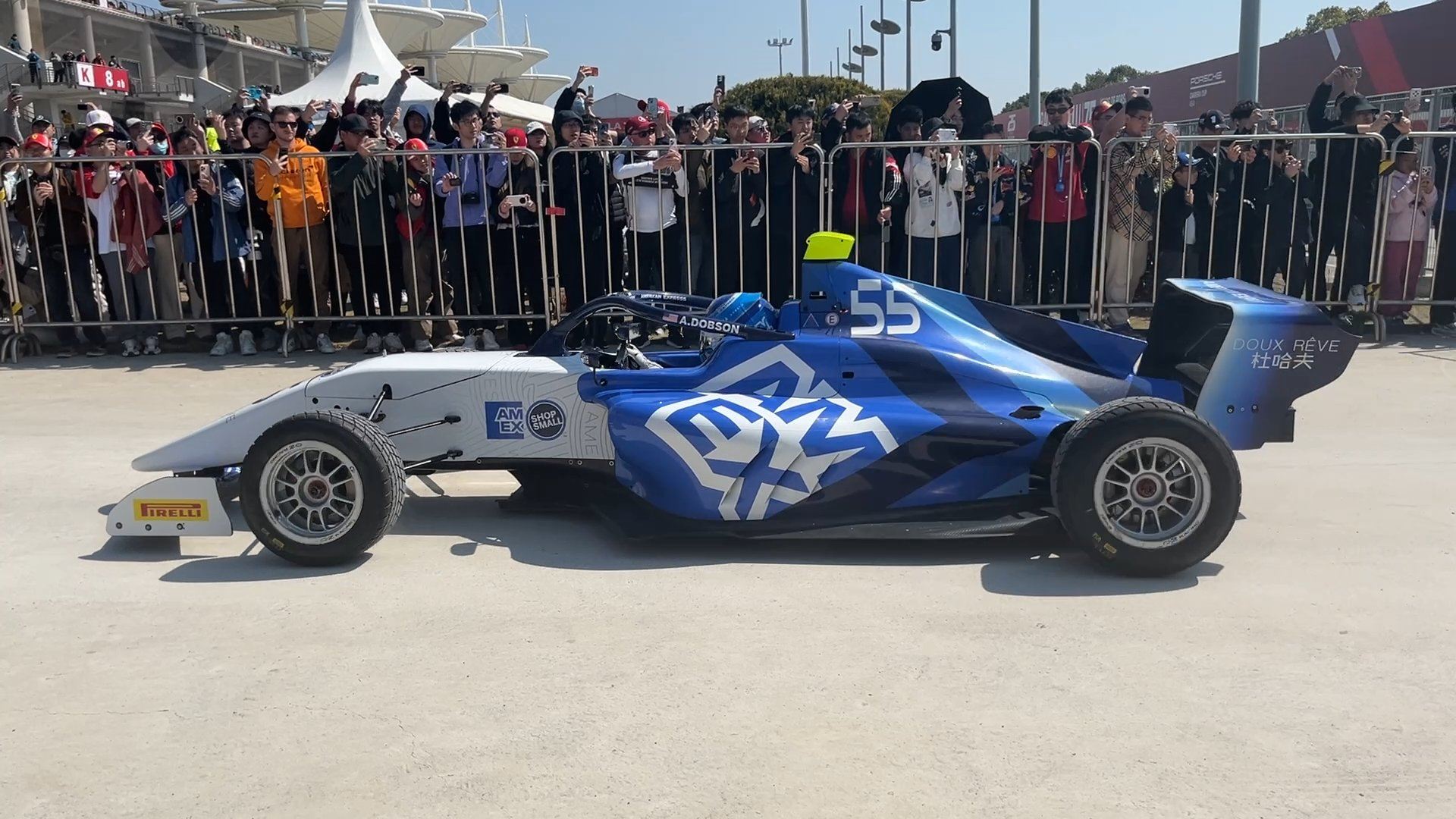
Dobson driving at the 2026 F1 Academy Shanghai round

Dobson raced full-time for Hitech TGR in the 2026 F1 Academy season, with backing from American Express.

== Karting record ==
=== Karting career summary ===
Season	Series	Team	Position
2019	SKUSA - Supernationals	N/A	32nd
2021	SKUSA - Supernationals	Merlin	24th
2022	SKUSA - Supernationals	Merlin	19th

== Racing record ==
=== Racing career summary ===
Season	Series	Team	Races	Wins	Poles	F/Laps	Podiums	Points	Position
2023	Formula 4 United States Championship	Jay Howard Driver Development	12	0	0	0	0	0	31st
2023	USF Juniors	Jay Howard Driver Development	3	0	0	0	0	28	16th
2023	USF2000 Championship	Jay Howard Driver Development	3	0	0	0	0	15	32nd
2024	USF Juniors	Jay Howard Driver Development	3	0	0	0	0	10	31st
2024	GB4 Championship	Velocity Racing Development	6	0	0	0	0	40	17th
2025	GB4 Championship	Arden Motorsport	21	0	0	0	1	120	19th
2025	F4 British Championship	Chris Dittmann Racing	2	0	0	0	0	0	NC†
2025	F1 Academy	Hitech TGR	1	0	0	0	0	0	23rd
2025	F4 Saudi Arabian Championship	Peax	10	0	0	0	0	36	11th
2026	F1 Academy	Hitech TGR	14	0	0	0	0	14	16th

^{†} As Dobson was a guest driver, she was ineligible for points.
* Season still in progress.

=== Complete Formula 4 United States Championship results ===
(key) (Races in bold indicate pole position) (Races in italics indicate fastest lap)

Year	Team	1	2	3	4	5	6	7	8	9	10	11	12	13	14	15	16	17	18	DC	Points
2023	Jay Howard Driver Development	NOL; 1	NOL; 2	NOL; 3	ROA; 1	ROA; 2	ROA; 3	MOH; 1; 24	MOH; 2; 24	MOH; 3; 24	NJM; 1; 14	NJM; 2; 20	NJM; 3; 17	VIR; 1; 11	VIR; 2; 18	VIR; 3 Ret	COA; 1; 19	COA; 2; 16	COA; 3; 13	31st	0

=== American open-wheel racing results ===
==== USF Juniors ====
(key) (Races in bold indicate pole position) (Races in italics indicate fastest lap) (Races with * indicate most race laps led)

Year	Team	1	2	3	4	5	6	7	8	9	10	11	12	13	14	15	16	DC	Points
2023	Jay Howard Driver Development	SEB; 1	SEB; 2	SEB; 3	ALA; 1	ALA; 2	VIR; 1	VIR; 2	VIR; 3	MOH; 1	MOH; 2	ROA; 1; 12	ROA; 2; 12	ROA; 3; 11	COA; 1	COA; 2	COA; 3	16th	28
2024	Jay Howard Driver Development	NOL; 1; 18	NOL; 2; 15	NOL; 3 DNS	ALA; 1; 21	ALA; 2 DNS	VIR; 1	VIR; 2	VIR; 3	MOH; 1	MOH; 2	ROA; 1	ROA; 2	ROA; 3	POR; 1	POR; 2	POR; 3	31st	10

==== USF2000 Championship ====
(key) (Races in bold indicate pole position) (Races in italics indicate fastest lap) (Races with * indicate most race laps led)

Year	Team	1	2	3	4	5	6	7	8	9	10	11	12	13	14	15	16	17	18	DC	Points
2023	Jay Howard Driver Development	STP; 1	STP; 2	SEB; 1	SEB; 1	IMS; 1	IMS; 2	IMS; 3	IRP	ROA; 1	ROA; 2	MOH; 1	MOH; 2	MOH; 3	TOR; 1	TOR; 2	POR; 1; 13	POR; 2; 16	POR; 3; 19	32nd	15

=== Complete GB4 Championship results ===
(key) (Races in bold indicate pole position) (Races in italics indicate fastest lap)

Year	Entrant	1	2	3	4	5	6	7	8	9	10	11	12	13	14	15	16	17	18	19	20	21	22	DC	Points
2024	Velocity Racing Development	OUL; 1	OUL; 2	OUL; 3	SIL1; 1	SIL1; 2	SIL1; 3	DON1; 1	DON1; 2	DON1; 3	SNE; 1	SNE; 2	SNE; 3	SIL2; 1; 13	SIL2; 2; 9	SIL2; 3; 11	DON2; 1; 14	DON2; 2; 14	DON2; 3; 15	BRH; 1	BRH; 2	BRH; 3		17th	40
2025	Arden Motorsport	DON; 1; 12	DON; 2; 10	DON; 3; 23	SIL1; 1; 21	SIL1; 2; 14	SIL1; 3; 13^{4}	OUL; 1; 8	OUL; 2 Ret	OUL; 3; 19	SNE; 1; 18	SNE; 2; 19	SNE; 3; 14^{5}	SIL2; 1; 15	SIL2; 2; 19	SIL2; 3; 19	BRH; 1; 11	BRH; 2; 13	BRH; 3 C	DON2; 1; 14	DON2; 2; 3	DON2; 3; 23	DON2; 4; 12	19th	120

=== Complete F4 British Championship results ===
(key) (Races in bold indicate pole position; races in italics indicate fastest lap)

Year	Team	1	2	3	4	5	6	7	8	9	10	11	12	13	14	15	16	17	18	19	20	21	22	23	24	25	26	27	28	29	30	31	32	DC	Points
2025	Chris Dittmann Racing	DPN; 1	DPN; 2	DPN; 3	SILGP; 1	SILGP; 2	SILGP; 3	SNE; 1	SNE; 2	SNE; 3	THR; 1	THR; 2	THR; 3	OUL; 1	OUL; 2	OUL; 3	SILGP; 1; 17	SILGP; 2; 15	ZAN; 1	ZAN; 2	ZAN; 3	KNO; 1	KNO; 2	KNO; 3	DPGP; 1	DPGP; 2	DPGP; 3	SILN; 1	SILN; 2	SILN; 3	BRH; 1	BRH; 2	BRH; 3	NC†	0

^{†} As Dobson was a guest driver, she was ineligible for points.

=== Complete F1 Academy results ===
(key) (Races in bold indicate pole position) (Races in italics indicate fastest lap)

Year	Entrant	1	2	3	4	5	6	7	8	9	10	11	12	13	14	15	DC	Points
2025	Hitech TGR	SHA; 1	SHA; 2	JED; 1	JED; 2	MIA; 1; 13	MIA; 2 C	MTL; 1	MTL; 2	MTL; 3	ZAN; 1	ZAN; 2	SIN; 1	SIN; 2	LVG; 1	LVG; 2	23rd	0
2026	Hitech TGR	SHA; 1; 9	SHA; 2; 10	MTL; 1; 17	MTL; 2 Ret	MTL; 3; 17	SIL; 1; 7	SIL; 2; 8	ZAN; 1; 8	ZAN; 2; 13	COA; 1 Ret	COA; 2 Ret	COA; 3; 13	LVG; 1	LVG; 2			

=== Complete F4 Saudi Arabian Championship results ===
(key) (Races in bold indicate pole position) (Races in italics indicate fastest lap)

Year	Team	1	2	3	4	5	6	7	8	9	10	DC	Points
2025	Peax	BHR1; 1; 10	BHR1; 2 Ret	BHR2; 1; 8	BHR2; 2; 10	JED1; 1; 10	JED1; 2; 10	JED2; 1; 7	JED2; 2; 6	JED3; 1; 7	JED3; 2; 6	11th	36
