= Anthony Martella =

Canadian racing driver (born 2008)

- Nationality: (Canada) Canadian
- Born: 22 September 2008 (age 18) Toronto, Canada

USF2000 Championship career
- Debut season: 2024
- Current team: Exclusive Autosport
- Car number: 92
- Former teams: Jay Howard Driver Development
- Starts: 35
- Wins: 4
- Podiums: 5
- Poles: 1
- Fastest laps: 2
- Best finish: 7th in 2025

Previous series
- 2024 2024 2024: Sports Car Championship Canada; USF Juniors; YACademy Winter Series

Anthony Martella (born 22 September 2008 in Toronto) is a Canadian racing driver who last competed in USF Pro 2000 Championship for Exclusive Autosport.

== Career ==
Martella began his karting career in 2020, racing Junior Briggs in Canada. In his time karting in Canada, Martella most notably was the 2021 Canadian Karting Champion in the Briggs Junior Lite class, and was also the 2023 Pro Shifter champion in the same series, under the guidance of Marijn Kremers. After making his debut in America in 2022, Martella participated in the SKUSA SuperNationals at the end of the year, racing in both the KA 100 J and X30 Junior classes, most notably finishing eighth in the latter.

Martella made his single-seater debut in 2024, joining Exclusive Autosport for the YACademy Winter Series. After taking a best result of sixth at Homestead-Miami, he stayed with the team to compete in USF Juniors. Scoring his first top ten of the season in his second race in the series at NOLA Motorsports Park, Martella took two more top-ten results at Virginia International Raceway before leaving the series. During 2024, Martella also made a one-off appearance in the USF 2000 Championship at Road America.

However, Martella's main programme in 2024 was in Canada, where he competed for his family-owned team in the TCR class of the Sports Car Championship Canada. In his maiden season in TCR machinery, Martella took his maiden win at Toronto, before taking further wins at Trois-Rivières and Mosport to finish runner-up in points to Richard Boake.

After testing USF2000 machinery at the end of 2024 with Exclusive Autosport, Martella joined Jay Howard Driver Development for his rookie season in USF2000. Starting off the season with a sixth place finish in race one at St. Petersburg, Martella scored a seventh place finish in race two at NOLA Motorsports Park to head to Indianapolis 13th in points. After finishing no better than fourteenth at Indianapolis, Martella dominated the Freedom 75 two weeks later at Indianapolis Raceway Park to take his maiden win in single-seaters. In the remaining four rounds Martella took six more top-tens, which included his second top five of the season, a fifth place in race two at the season-ending round at Portland.

The following year, Martella returned to Exclusive Autosport for his second season in USF2000. During 2026, Martella also made select appearances in USF Pro 2000 with the same team. In the former, Martella began the season by taking wins at Indianapolis and Road America, as well as leading much of the Freedom 75 at Indianapolis Raceway Park but retired after contact with a lapped car. A win at Mid-Ohio and a podium at Portland then followed, before Martella returned to USF Pro 2000 for the final two rounds of the season.

== Personal life ==
Martella is the son of Martella Motorsports team owner Tony Martella. Martella is of Italian descent.

== Karting record ==
=== Karting career summary ===
Season	Series	Team	Position
2022	USPKS — X30 Pro Junior		8th
2022	SKUSA SuperNationals — KA 100 J	Racing Edge Motorsports	38th
2022	SKUSA SuperNationals — X30 Junior	Racing Edge Motorsports	8th
2023	SKUSA SuperNationals — X30 Senior		NC
2024	SKUSA SuperNationals — Pro Shifter	PSL Karting	43rd

== Racing record ==
=== Racing career summary ===
Season	Series	Team	Races	Wins	Poles	F/Laps	Podiums	Points	Position
2024	YACademy Winter Series	Exclusive Autosport	6	0	0	0	0	??	??
2024	USF Juniors	Exclusive Autosport	7	0	0	0	0	55	23rd
2024	USF2000 Championship	Exclusive Autosport	2	0	0	0	0	14	27th
2024	Sports Car Championship Canada – TCR	Martella Motorsports	10	3	5	0	7	308	**2nd**
2025	USF2000 Championship	Jay Howard Driver Development	18	1	0	1	1	220	7th
2026	USF2000 Championship	Exclusive Autosport	15	3	1	1	4	209	10th
2026	USF Pro 2000 Championship	Exclusive Autosport	6	0	0	0	0	70	17th

* Season still in progress.

=== Complete Sports Car Championship Canada results ===
(key) (Races in bold indicate pole position) (Races in italics indicate fastest lap) (Races with * indicate most race laps led)

Year	Team	Class	Car	1	2	3	4	5	6	7	8	9	10	Rank	Points
2024	Martella Motorsports	TCR	Audi RS 3 LMS TCR (2021)	MSP1; 1; 2	MSP1; 2; 5	**CMP**; **1**; 2	CMP; 2 DSQ	**TOR**; **1**; 2	TOR; 2; 1	**CTR**; **1**; 1	CTR; 2; 6†	**MSP2**; **1**; 2	MSP2; 2; 1	2nd	308

† Martella did not finish the race, but was classified as he completed over 75% of the race distance.

=== American open-wheel racing results ===
==== USF Juniors ====
(key) (Races in bold indicate pole position) (Races in italics indicate fastest lap) (Races with * indicate most race laps led)

Year	Team	1	2	3	4	5	6	7	8	9	10	11	12	13	14	15	16	Rank	Points
2024	Exclusive Autosport	NOL; 1; 17	NOL; 2; 10	NOL; 3; 12	ALA; 1; 15	ALA; 2 DNS	VIR; 1; 10	VIR; 2; 18	VIR; 3; 10	MOH; 1	MOH; 2	ROA; 1	ROA; 2	ROA; 3	POR; 1	POR; 2	POR; 3	23rd	55

==== USF2000 Championship ====
(key) (Races in bold indicate pole position) (Races in italics indicate fastest lap) (Races with * indicate most race laps led)

Year	Team	1	2	3	4	5	6	7	8	9	10	11	12	13	14	15	16	17	18	Rank	Points
2024	Exclusive Autosport	STP; 1	STP; 2	NOL; 1	NOL; 2	NOL; 3	IMS; 1	IMS; 2	IRP	ROA; 1; 12	ROA; 2; 16	MOH; 1	MOH; 2	MOH; 3	TOR; 1	TOR; 2	POR; 1	POR; 2	POR; 3	27th	14
2025	Jay Howard Driver Development	STP; 1; 6	STP; 2; 15	NOL; 1; 19	NOL; 2; 7	NOL; 3; 11	IMS; 1; 14	IMS; 2; 16	IRP; 1*	ROA; 1; 13	ROA; 2; 6	MOH; 1; 7	MOH; 2; 12	MOH; 3; 17	TOR; 1; 6	TOR; 2; 16	POR; 1; 8	POR; 2; 5	POR; 3; 7	7th	220
2026	Exclusive Autosport	STP; 1; 21	STP; 2; 22	IMS; 1; 1*	IMS; 2; 4	IMS; 3; 19	IRP; 18*	ROA1; 1; 9	ROA1; 2; 1*	ROA1; 3; 5	MOH; 1; 17	**MOH**; **2**; 1*	POR; 1; 2	POR; 2; 21	MAR; 1; 4	MAR; 2; 14	ROA2; 1	ROA2; 2	ROA2; 3	10th	209

==== USF Pro 2000 Championship ====
(key) (Races in bold indicate pole position) (Races in italics indicate fastest lap) (Races with * indicate most race laps led)

Year	Team	1	2	3	4	5	6	7	8	9	10	11	12	13	14	15	16	17	18	Rank	Points
2026	Exclusive Autosport	ARL; 1; 7	ARL; 2; 14	IMS; 1	IMS; 2	IRP	ROA; 1	ROA; 2	MOH; 1	MOH; 2	MOH; 3	POR; 1	POR; 2	MAR; 1	MAR; 2	MIL; 5	ROA; 1; 16	ROA; 2; 15	ROA; 3; 9	17th	70
