= Sebastian Wheldon =

American racing driver (born 2009)

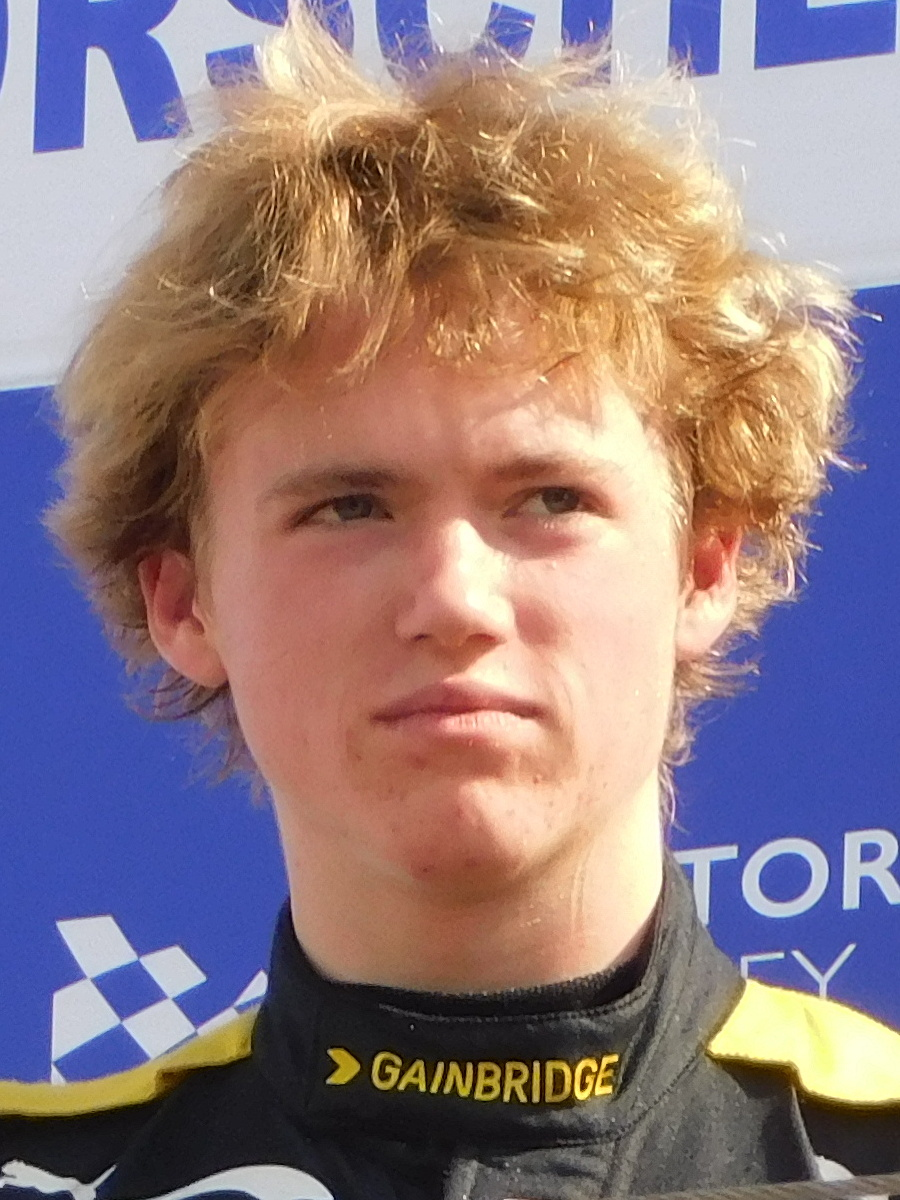
- Wheldon in 2025
- Nationality: (United States) American (United Kingdom) British via dual nationality
- Born: Sebastian Daniel Wheldon; 1 February 2009 (age 17) St. Petersburg, Florida, U.S.
- Relatives: Dan Wheldon (father); Oliver Wheldon (brother)

Formula Regional European Championship career
- Debut season: 2026
- Car number: 98
- Former teams: MP Motorsport
- Starts: 19
- Wins: 4
- Podiums: 8
- Poles: 4
- Fastest laps: 1
- Best finish: 2nd in 2026

Previous series
- 2026 2026 2025 2025 2025 2024 2024 2024 2023: FR European; FR Middle East; E4; Italian F4; F4 Middle East; Formula Trophy UAE; USF Juniors; YACademy Winter Series; Skip Barber Formula Race Series

Championship titles
- 2023: Skip Barber Formula Race Series
- Statistics up to date as of 9 October 2026.

Sebastian Daniel Wheldon (born 1 February 2009) is an American and British racing driver who is set to compete in the FIA Formula 3 Championship with Trident as part of the Andretti Global driver development program.

The son of IndyCar and Indianapolis 500 champion Dan Wheldon, Wheldon competed in USF Juniors with Velocity Racing Development in 2024. He moved to Europe for 2025, finishing third in the Italian F4 Championship, before progressing to Formula Regional Europe in 2026, placing runner-up.

== Early and personal life ==
Wheldon was born on 1 February 2009 in St. Petersburg, Florida.

Wheldon is the son of IndyCar champion and two-times Indianapolis 500 winner Dan Wheldon, who was killed in an accident at the Las Vegas Motor Speedway in 2011. His younger brother, Oliver, is also a racing driver. Wheldon was featured in the HBO Max documentary The Lionheart, which covered the legacy of his father's death on him, his brother, and his mother, Susie Wheldon.

During the 2025 Firestone Grand Prix of St. Petersburg, Wheldon drove the pace car during the parade lap in honor of his father.

== Career ==
=== Karting (2014–2022) ===
Wheldon had a consistent karting career, with his best championship result at the national stage being a third place in the SKUSA Winter Series in 2020, in the Mini Swift category. Wheldon has competed in the SKUSA SuperNationals twice in 2021 and 2022, with a best result of seventh in the X30 Junior category in 2021.

=== Formula 4 (2023–2025) ===
==== 2023 ====
Wheldon made his car racing debut in 2023, in the Skip Barber Formula Race Series. He managed to win the title against some experienced opposition including the likes of Jeshua Alianell, who had competed in the championship for two years previously. Wheldon amassed a total of thirteen podiums, six wins and ten fastest laps as he finished on 456 points over the course of sixteen races.

==== 2024 ====
In early 2024, it was announced that Wheldon joined the YACademy Winter Series with the VRD team, who would also be running his entry into the 2024 USF Juniors season. Wheldon impressed in YACademy, winning once and standing on the podium four times in just six races, losing out on the title to sophomore driver Jack Jeffers. As he moved on to the main season of USF Juniors, Wheldon had a strong first round, winning two races out of three and finishing second in the other at NOLA Motorsports Park, demonstrating that he would be a title contender as he moved to the top of the championship as a result.

In December, Wheldon took part in the final round of Formula Trophy UAE. He achieved pole position and a victory during race 1 at the Yas Marina Circuit, marking his first motorsport win outside of the Americas. The next day, he placed fourth in race two.

==== 2025 ====
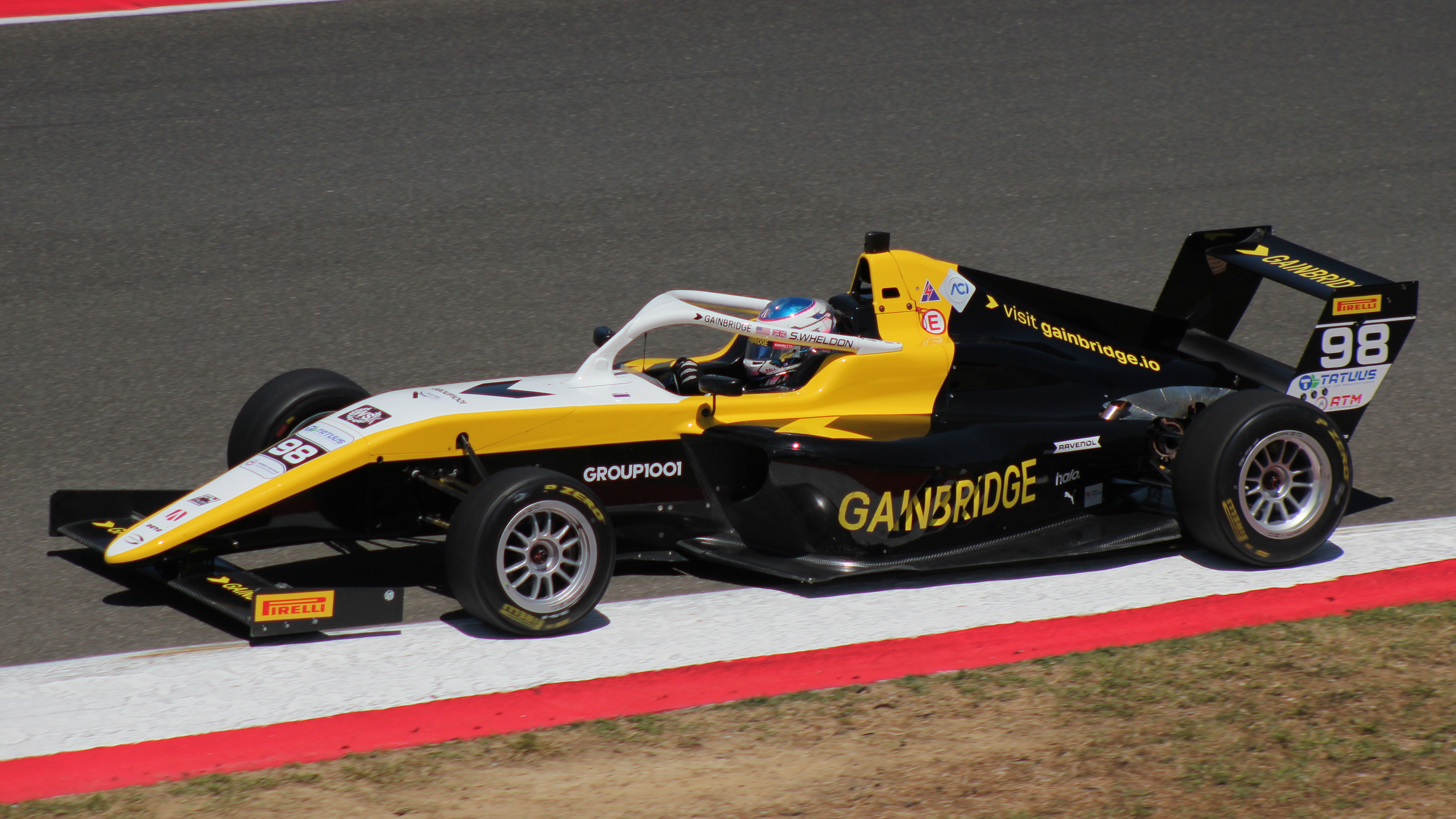
Wheldon driving at the Mugello Circuit during the 2025 Italian F4 Championship

At the start of 2025, Wheldon competed in the F4 Middle East Championship with Prema Racing. He finished in third place during round one at Yas Marina.

For his main campaign, Wheldon competed in the Italian F4 Championship and E4 Championship with Prema Racing.

=== Formula Regional (2026) ===
Prior to the start of his main 2026 campaign, Wheldon participated in the Formula Regional Middle East Trophy with Mumbai Falcons.

Wheldon was set to remain with Prema Racing in his promotion to the Formula Regional European Championship, but was replaced by Tomass Štolcermanis just two weeks later. He was later announced to be driving for MP Motorsport instead just a few days later. At the end of November, he stuck with MP as he raced in the annual Macau Grand Prix.

=== FIA Formula 3 (2027) ===
Wheldon will move up to Formula 3 in 2027, joining Trident.

== Karting record ==
=== Karting career summary ===
Season	Series	Team	Position
2014	WKA Manufacturer's Cup - Kid Kart		4th
2019	Florida Winter Tour - Mini ROK	JC Karting	6th
2019	ROK the Rio - Mini ROK	JC Karting	10th
2019	Biloxi ROK Fest - Mini ROK	JC Karting	19th
2020	SKUSA Winter Series - Mini Swift		3rd
2020	Florida Winter Tour - Mini ROK	JC Karting	5th
2020	SKUSA Pro Tour - Mini Swift		11th
2021	SKUSA SuperNationals - KA100 Junior	JC Karting	13th
2021	SKUSA SuperNationals - X30 Junior	JC Karting	7th
2022	SKUSA SuperNationals - X30 Junior	JC Karting	10th

== Racing record ==
=== Racing career summary ===
Season	Series	Team	Races	Wins	Poles	F/Laps	Podiums	Points	Position
2023	Skip Barber Formula Race Series	Skip Barber Racing School	16	6	10	10	13	456	**1st**
2024	YACademy Winter Series	Velocity Racing Development	6	1	1	3	4	33	**2nd**
2024	USF Juniors	Velocity Racing Development	16	4	2	4	9	308	**3rd**
2024	Formula Trophy UAE	Mumbai Falcons Racing Limited	2	1	1	1	1	37	9th
2025	F4 Middle East Championship	Prema Racing	15	0	0	0	1	90	7th
2025	Italian F4 Championship	Prema Racing	20	6	3	5	9	256	**3rd**
2025	E4 Championship	Prema Racing	9	1	0	3	3	88	4th
2025	FIA F4 World Cup		1	0	0	1	0	—N/a	4th
2026	Formula Regional Middle East Trophy	Mumbai Falcons Racing Limited	11	0	1	1	3	71	5th
2026	Formula Regional European Championship	MP Motorsport	19	4	4	1	8	209	**2nd**
2026	Macau Grand Prix	MP Motorsport	0	0	0	0	0	—N/a	TBD
2027	FIA Formula 3 Championship	Trident	0	0	0	0	0	0	TBD

* Season still in progress.

=== American open-wheel racing results ===
==== USF Juniors ====
(key) (Races in bold indicate pole position) (Races in italics indicate fastest lap) (Races with * indicate most race laps led)

Year	Team	1	2	3	4	5	6	7	8	9	10	11	12	13	14	15	16	Rank	Points
2024	Velocity Racing Development	NOL; 1; 1*	**NOL**; **2**; 2	NOL; 3; 1*	ALA; 1; 6	ALA; 2; 2	VIR; 1; 21	VIR; 2; 19	VIR; 3; 1	MOH; 1; 22	MOH; 2; 4	ROA; 1; 8	**ROA**; **2**; 18*	ROA; 3; 1*	POR; 1; 2	POR; 2; 3	POR; 3; 2	3rd	308

=== Complete Formula Trophy UAE results ===
(key) (Races in bold indicate pole position; races in italics indicate fastest lap)

Year	Team	1	2	3	4	5	6	7	DC	Points
2024	Mumbai Falcons Racing Limited	DUB; 1	DUB; 2	DUB; 3	YMC1; 1	YMC1; 2	**YMC2**; **1**; 1	YMC2; 2; 4	9th	37

=== Complete F4 Middle East Championship results ===
(key) (Races in bold indicate pole position; races in italics indicate fastest lap)

Year	Team	1	2	3	4	5	6	7	8	9	10	11	12	13	14	15	DC	Points
2025	Prema Racing	YMC1; 1; 3	YMC1; 2; 7	YMC1; 3; 5	YMC2; 1; 25†	YMC2; 2; 12	YMC2; 3; 5	DUB; 1 Ret	DUB; 2; 9	DUB; 3; 7	YMC3; 1; 12	YMC3; 2; 8	YMC3; 3; 7	LUS; 1; 8	LUS; 2; 8	LUS; 3; 17	7th	90

=== Complete Italian F4 Championship results ===
(key) (Races in bold indicate pole position; races in italics indicate fastest lap)

Year	Team	1	2	3	4	5	6	7	8	9	10	11	12	13	14	15	16	17	18	19	20	21	22	23	24	25	DC	Points
2025	Prema Racing	MIS1; 1; 1	MIS1; 2	MIS1; 3; 2	MIS1; 4; 5	VLL; 1	VLL; 2; 2	VLL; 3; 1	VLL; 4; 25	**MNZ**; **1**; 1	MNZ; 2; 3	MNZ; 3; 28	MUG; 1; 7	MUG; 2; 4	MUG; 3; 14	IMO; 1; 10	IMO; 2 C	IMO; 3; 11	CAT; 1; 6	CAT; 2; 4	CAT; 3 C	**MIS2**; **1**; 1	MIS2; 2; 1	MIS2; 3	**MIS2**; **4**; 1	MIS2; 5; 7	3rd	256

=== Complete E4 Championship results ===
(key) (Races in bold indicate pole position; races in italics indicate fastest lap)

Year	Team	1	2	3	4	5	6	7	8	9	DC	Points
2025	Prema Racing	LEC; 1; 3	LEC; 2; 4	LEC; 3; 3	MUG; 1; 9	MUG; 2; 9	MUG; 3; 1	MNZ; 1; 8	MNZ; 2; 4	MNZ; 3; 10	4th	88

=== Complete FIA F4 World Cup results ===
Year	Car	Qualifying	Quali Race	Main Race
2025	Mygale M21-F4	**1st**	DNF	4th

=== Complete Formula Regional Middle East Trophy results ===
(key) (Races in bold indicate pole position) (Races in italics indicate fastest lap)

Year	Entrant	1	2	3	4	5	6	7	8	9	10	11	12	DC	Points
2026	Mumbai Falcons Racing Limited	YMC1; 1; 31	YMC1; 2; 21	YMC1; 3; 14	YMC2; 1; 7	YMC2; 2; 4	**YMC2**; **3**; 3	DUB; 1 Ret	DUB; 2; 17	DUB; 3; 9	LUS; 1; 2	LUS; 2 C	LUS; 3; 2	5th	71

=== Complete Formula Regional European Championship results ===
(key) (Races in bold indicate pole position) (Races in italics indicate fastest lap)

Year	Team	1	2	3	4	5	6	7	8	9	10	11	12	13	14	15	16	17	18	19	20	DC	Points
2026	MP Motorsport	RBR; 1; 3	RBR; 2; 19	RBR; 3; 3	**ZAN**; **1**; 1	ZAN; 2; 1	SPA; 1; 5	SPA; 2 C	SPA; 3; 10	MNZ; 1; 5	MNZ; 2; 20	MNZ; 3; 2	HUN; 1; 26	HUN; 2 Ret	LEC; 1; 5	**LEC**; **2**; 1	IMO; 1; 2	IMO; 2; 8	IMO; 3; 12	**HOC**; **1**; 19	**HOC**; **2**; 1	2nd	209

=== Complete Macau Grand Prix results ===
Year	Team	Car	Qualifying	Quali Race	Main Race
2026	(Netherlands) MP Motorsport	Tatuus T-326	TBD	TBD	TBD

=== Complete FIA Formula 3 Championship results ===
(key) (Races in bold indicate pole position) (Races in italics indicate fastest lap)

Year	Entrant	1	2	3	4	5	6	7	8	9	10	11	12	13	14	15	16	17	18	19	20	DC	Points
2027	Trident	BHR; SPR	BHR; FEA	JED; SPR	JED; FEA	MEL; SPR	MEL; FEA	MTL; SPR	MTL; FEA	MON; SPR	MON; FEA	SIL; SPR	SIL; FEA	RBR; SPR	RBR; FEA	MNZ; SPR	MNZ; FEA	MAD; SPR	MAD; FEA	IST; SPR	IST; FEA	TBD	TBD
