= 2024 USF Juniors =

Racing season

The 2024 USF Juniors presented by Continental Tire championship was the third season of USF Juniors. The season featured a six-round 16-race calendar, which began on April 5 at NOLA Motorsports Park and concluded on August 25 at the Portland International Raceway.

The championship serves as the bottom rung of the IndyCar Series's USF Pro Championships ladder system.

== Series news ==
- The scholarship for the champion to move up to the USF2000 Championship was slightly increased to $263,700.
- All three ladder series organized by Andersen Promotions will end their long-running affiliation with Cooper Tires as supplier and presenting partner. Continental will be the new tire supplier and title partner of the series.

== Drivers and teams ==
Team	No.	Drivers	Status	Rounds
(United States) DEForce Racing	15	(Brazil) Vinícius Tessaro	R	1–3
(United States) DEForce Racing	15	(United States) Jeshua Alianell	R	4–16
(United States) DEForce Racing	16	(Brazil) Bruno Ribeiro	R	1–13
(United States) DEForce Racing	17	(United States) Leandro Juncos	R	1–13
(United States) DEForce Racing	18	(United States) Brady Golan		All
(United States) DEForce Racing Driver Development	19	(Mexico) Patricio González	R	All
(United States) DEForce Racing Driver Development	20	(Mexico) Rodrigo Gonzalez	R	All
(United States) Exclusive Autosport	90	(Brazil) João Vergara	R	All
(United States) Exclusive Autosport	91	(United States) Evan Cooley	R	1–5, 9–16
(United States) Exclusive Autosport	92	(United States) Jack Jeffers		All
(United States) Exclusive Autosport	93	(United States) Giovanni Cabrera		4–5
(United States) Exclusive Autosport	94	(United States) Brenden Cooley	R	11–13
(United States) Exclusive Autosport	95	(Canada) Anthony Martella	R	1–8
(United States) International Motorsport	24	(United States) Augusto Soto-Schirripa	R	All
(United States) International Motorsport	25	(Israel) Ariel Elkin	R	All
(United States) International Motorsport	26	(United States) Hudson Potter		11–16
(United States) Jay Howard Driver Development	3	(United States) G3 Argyros	R	1–5
(United States) Jay Howard Driver Development	63	(United States) G3 Argyros	R	6–16
(United States) Jay Howard Driver Development	4	(United States) Hudson Potter		1–10
(United States) Jay Howard Driver Development	4	(United States) Michael Boyiadzis	R	11–13
(United States) Jay Howard Driver Development	5	(United States) Ava Dobson	R	1–5
(United States) Jay Howard Driver Development	6	(United States) Aiden Potter	R	1–5
(United States) Jay Howard Driver Development	6	(United States) Michael Boyiadzis	R	6–8
(United States) Jay Howard Driver Development	6	(United States) JT Hoskins	R	9–16
(United States) Jay Howard Driver Development	7	(Canada) Ayden Ingratta	R	1–10
(United States) Jay Howard Driver Development	7	(United States) Griffin Yellin	R	11–16
(United States) Jay Howard Driver Development	8	(France) Timothy Carel	R	All
(United States) Jay Howard Driver Development	9	(United Kingdom) Liam McNeilly	R	All
(United States) Skip Barber Racing	50	(United States) Jeshua Alianell	R	1–3
(United States) Velocity Racing Development	10	(United States) Michael Suco	R	All
(United States) Velocity Racing Development	33	(United States) Max Taylor	R	All
(United States) Velocity Racing Development	70	(United States) Christian Cameron	R	All
(United States) Velocity Racing Development	98	(United States) Sebastian Wheldon	R	All
(United States) Zanella Racing	12	(Mexico) Diego Guiot	R	All
(United States) Zanella Racing	13	(Venezuela) Alex Popow Jr.	R	1–3
(United States) Zanella Racing	13	(United States) Teddy Musella	R	4–5
(United States) Zanella Racing	55	(Brazil) Leonardo Escorpioni	R	All

Icon	Status
R	Rookie

== Schedule ==
Round	Date	Race name	Circuit	Location
1	April 5–7	Continental Tire Grand Prix of Louisiana	NOLA Motorsports Park	Avondale, Louisiana
2	April 5–7	Continental Tire Grand Prix of Louisiana	NOLA Motorsports Park	Avondale, Louisiana
3	April 5–7	Continental Tire Grand Prix of Louisiana	NOLA Motorsports Park	Avondale, Louisiana
4	April 25–28	Continental Tire Grand Prix of Alabama	Barber Motorsports Park	Birmingham, Alabama
5	April 25–28	Continental Tire Grand Prix of Alabama	Barber Motorsports Park	Birmingham, Alabama
6	June 14–16	Continental Tire VIR Grand Prix	Virginia International Raceway	Alton, Virginia
7	June 14–16	Continental Tire VIR Grand Prix	Virginia International Raceway	Alton, Virginia
8	June 14–16	Continental Tire VIR Grand Prix	Virginia International Raceway	Alton, Virginia
9	July 4–7	Tatuus Grand Prix of Mid-Ohio	Mid-Ohio Sports Car Course	Lexington, Ohio
10	July 4–7	Tatuus Grand Prix of Mid-Ohio	Mid-Ohio Sports Car Course	Lexington, Ohio
11	August 9–11	PFC Grand Prix of Road America	Road America	Elkhart Lake, Wisconsin
12	August 9–11	PFC Grand Prix of Road America	Road America	Elkhart Lake, Wisconsin
13	August 9–11	PFC Grand Prix of Road America	Road America	Elkhart Lake, Wisconsin
14	August 22–24	Continental Tire Grand Prix of Portland	Portland International Raceway	Portland, Oregon
15	August 22–24	Continental Tire Grand Prix of Portland	Portland International Raceway	Portland, Oregon
16	August 22–24	Continental Tire Grand Prix of Portland	Portland International Raceway	Portland, Oregon

== Race results ==
Rd.	Track	Pole position	Fastest lap	Most laps led	Race winner	
Rd.	Track	Pole position	Fastest lap	Most laps led	Driver	Team
1	NOLA Motorsports Park	(United Kingdom) Liam McNeilly	(United States) Sebastian Wheldon	(United States) Sebastian Wheldon	(United States) Sebastian Wheldon	Velocity Racing Development
2	NOLA Motorsports Park	(United States) Sebastian Wheldon	(United Kingdom) Liam McNeilly	(United States) Sebastian Wheldon (United Kingdom) Liam McNeilly	(United Kingdom) Liam McNeilly	Jay Howard Driver Development
3	NOLA Motorsports Park	(United Kingdom) Liam McNeilly	(United States) Sebastian Wheldon	(United States) Sebastian Wheldon	(United States) Sebastian Wheldon	Velocity Racing Development
4	Barber Motorsports Park	(Israel) Ariel Elkin	(United States) Jack Jeffers	(Israel) Ariel Elkin	(Israel) Ariel Elkin	International Motorsport
5	Barber Motorsports Park	(Israel) Ariel Elkin	(Israel) Ariel Elkin	(Israel) Ariel Elkin	(Israel) Ariel Elkin	International Motorsport
6	Virginia International Raceway	(Brazil) Bruno Ribeiro	(United States) Max Taylor	(Israel) Ariel Elkin	(United States) Max Taylor	Velocity Racing Development
7	Virginia International Raceway	(Israel) Ariel Elkin	(Brazil) Bruno Ribeiro	(United Kingdom) Liam McNeilly	(United States) Augusto Soto-Schirripa	International Motorsport
8	Virginia International Raceway	(Israel) Ariel Elkin	(United States) Augusto Soto-Schirripa	(Israel) Ariel Elkin	(United States) Sebastian Wheldon	Velocity Racing Development
9	Mid-Ohio Sports Car Course	(United Kingdom) Liam McNeilly	(United Kingdom) Liam McNeilly	(United States) Max Taylor	(United States) Max Taylor	Velocity Racing Development
10	Mid-Ohio Sports Car Course	(United Kingdom) Liam McNeilly	(United States) Sebastian Wheldon	(United Kingdom) Liam McNeilly	(United Kingdom) Liam McNeilly	Jay Howard Driver Development
11	Road America	(United States) Max Taylor	(United States) Max Taylor	(United States) Max Taylor	(United States) Max Taylor	Velocity Racing Development
12	Road America	(United States) Sebastian Wheldon	(United States) Max Taylor	(United States) Sebastian Wheldon	(Israel) Ariel Elkin	International Motorsport
13	Road America	(United States) Max Taylor	(United States) Sebastian Wheldon	(United States) Sebastian Wheldon	(United States) Sebastian Wheldon	Velocity Racing Development
14	Portland International Raceway	(United States) Max Taylor	(United Kingdom) Liam McNeilly	(United States) Augusto Soto-Schirripa	(United Kingdom) Liam McNeilly	Jay Howard Driver Development
15	Portland International Raceway	(United Kingdom) Liam McNeilly	(Brazil) Leonardo Escorpioni	(United Kingdom) Liam McNeilly	(United Kingdom) Liam McNeilly	Jay Howard Driver Development
16	Portland International Raceway	(Brazil) Leonardo Escorpioni	(Israel) Ariel Elkin	(United States) G3 Argyros	(United Kingdom) Liam McNeilly	Jay Howard Driver Development

== Championship standings ==
=== Drivers' Championship ===
Scoring system

Position	1st	2nd	3rd	4th	5th	6th	7th	8th	9th	10th	11th	12th	13th	14th	15th	16th	17th	18th	19th	20th+
Points	30	25	22	19	17	15	14	13	12	11	10	9	8	7	6	5	4	3	2	1

- The driver who qualifies on pole is awarded one additional point.
- One point is awarded to the driver who leads the most laps in a race.
- One point is awarded to the driver who sets the fastest lap during the race.

Pos	Driver	NOL			ALA		VIR			MOH		ROA			POR			Points
1	(United States) Max Taylor	3	6	2	8	5	1	5	3	1*	5	1*	6	3	3	2	DNS	329
2	(United Kingdom) Liam McNeilly	2	1*	3	4	24	7	12*	4	3*	1*	14	17	4	1	1*	1	324
3	(United States) Sebastian Wheldon	1*	2*	1*	6	2	21	19	1	22	4	8	18*	1*	2	3	2	308
4	(Israel) Ariel Elkin	5	3	4	1*	1*	8*	22	13*	7	3	20	1	2	17	5	6	278
5	(United States) Jack Jeffers	6	5	7	2	19	3	21	2	2	11	3	3	12	15	6	4	250
6	(United States) Augusto Soto-Schirripa	26	4	6	3	3	2	1	21	5	6	2	13	22	5*	10	11	237
7	(United States) G3 Argyros	7	16	22	11	22	4	3	18	4*	9	22	2	20	19	16	3*	163
8	(Brazil) João Vergara	10	24	13	9	6	9	9	8	20	13	4	7	16	13	9	14	158
9	(Brazil) Leonardo Escorpioni	8	14	8	20	23	19	2	22	18	10	5	5	6	21	18	7	146
10	(United States) Christian Cameron	13	13	10	25	11	12	17	17	23	15	23	11	5	7	8	5	135
11	(France) Timothy Carel	16	DNS	DNS	23	14	5	8	7	9	22	6	10	8	14	7	20	131
12	(United States) Brady Golan	15	19	20	12	20	22	7	9	19	8	10	9	9	4	11	18	128
13	(United States) Evan Cooley	14	9	11	5	21				6	20	15	4	23	16	4	8	126
14	(Mexico) Diego Guiot	21	21	18	22	18	15	6	6	10	16	7	14	7	8	17	9	125
15	(Mexico) Patricio González	19	20	16	24	9	14	10	16	12	12	9	15	10	6	14	12	124
16	(Brazil) Bruno Ribeiro	11	8	9	19	DNS	6	4	15	17	2	21	24	DNS				109
17	(Canada) Ayden Ingratta	9	7	23	13	8	13	23	5	8	7							101
18	(United States) Jeshua Alianell	Wth	Wth	Wth	26	13	11	16	20	11	19	17	8	14	18	13	10	83
19	(United States) Leandro Juncos	12	12	14	7	4	16	20	12	14	23	Wth	Wth	Wth				81
20	(Mexico) Rodrigo González	20	17	21	14	10	20	11	19	15	14	12	23	13	20	15	19	77
21	(United States) Michael Suco	22	18	15	17	15	23	15	14	13	17	24	16	19	9	21	13	75
22	(United States) Hudson Potter	23	23	24	DNS	16	17	13	23	21	18	13	22	21	10	12	15	59
23	(Canada) Anthony Martella	17	10	12	15	DNS	10	18	10									55
24	(United States) Michael Boyiadzis						18	14	11			11	12	11				49
25	(Brazil) Vinícius Tessaro	4	11	5														46
26	(United States) JT Hoskins									16	21	19	19	18	11	19	16	31
27	(United States) Teddy Musella				10	7												25
28	(United States) Griffin Yellin											18	20	17	12	20	17	23
29	(United States) Aidan Potter	24	25	19	18	12												16
30	(United States) Brenden Cooley											16	21	15				12
31	(United States) Ava Dobson	18	15	DNS	21	DNS												10
32	(United States) Giovanni Cabrera				16	17												9
33	(Venezuela) Alex Popow Jr.	25	22	17														6

== See also ==
- 2024 IndyCar Series
- 2024 Indy NXT
- 2024 USF Pro 2000 Championship
- 2024 USF2000 Championship
