= 2024 USF2000 Championship =

American Open Wheel Racing season

The 2024 USF2000 Championship presented by Continental Tire will be the fifteenth season of the USF2000 Championship since its revival in 2010. The championship serves as the second rung of the IndyCar Series's USF Pro Championships ladder system.

== Series news ==
- The scholarship for the champion to move up to the USF Pro 2000 Championship was slightly increased to $458,400.
- All three ladder series organized by Andersen Promotions will end their long-running affiliation with Cooper Tires as supplier and presenting partner. Continental will be the new tire supplier and title partner of the series.

== Drivers and teams ==
Team	No.	Drivers	Status	Rounds
DC Autosport	57	(United States) Carson Etter		All
DC Autosport	58	(United States) Ayrton Houk	R	1–13, 16–18
DD Autosports	14	(United States) Cole Kleck	R	3–5
DEForce Racing	1	(Brazil) Nicolas Giaffone	R	All
DEForce Racing	10	(Brazil) Lucas Fecury	R	All
DEForce Racing	11	(Australia) Quinn Armstrong	R	All
DEForce Racing	12	(United States) Maxwell Jamieson		All
DEForce Racing	18	(United States) Brady Golan	R	All
Exclusive Autosport	90	(United States) Jack Jeffers		1–2
Exclusive Autosport	90	(United States) Evan Cooley	R	6–7, 14–15
Exclusive Autosport	91	(United States) Joey Brienza	R	All
Exclusive Autosport	92	(United States) Thomas Schrage		1–7
Exclusive Autosport	92	(Australia) Eddie Beswick	R	14–15
Exclusive Autosport	93	(United States) Giovanni Cabrera	R	6–7, 9–13
Exclusive Autosport	95	(Canada) Anthony Martella	R	9–10
Jay Howard Driver Development	6	(United States) Evagoras Papasavvas		All
Jay Howard Driver Development	7	(United States) Jace Bacon	R	9–15
Jay Howard Driver Development	7	(United States) G3 Argyros	R	6–7
Jay Howard Driver Development	63	(United States) G3 Argyros	R	8–10, 14–18
Jay Howard Driver Development	8	(United States) Michael Costello	R	All
Jay Howard Driver Development	9	(United States) Tanner DeFabis	R	1–10
Jay Howard Driver Development	9	(United Kingdom) Liam McNeilly	R	14–15
Pabst Racing	22	(United States) Hudson Schwartz	R	All
Pabst Racing	23	(United States) Sam Corry		All
Pabst Racing	24	(United States) Max Garcia		All
Sarah Fisher Hartman Racing Development	67	(United States) Elliot Cox		All
Velocity Racing Development	2	(Canada) Nico Christodoulou		1–7
Velocity Racing Development	2	(United States) Thomas Schrage		11–18
Velocity Racing Development	3	(United States) Max Taylor		All
Velocity Racing Development	14	(United States) Cole Kleck	R	1–2
Velocity Racing Development	19	(Australia) Xavier Kokai	R	1–13

Icon	Status
R	Rookie

== Schedule ==
The 2024 schedule was revealed on October 27, 2023. It will feature two street circuits, five road courses and one oval round. The round at Sebring International Raceway was dropped in favor of a triple-header at NOLA Motorsports Park, this results in the round at Indianapolis Motor Speedway reducing to a double-header. All rounds except the weekends at NOLA and Indianapolis Raceway Park supported IndyCar.

Rd.	Date	Race name	Track	Location
1	March 8–10	The Andersen Companies Grand Prix of St. Petersburg	R Streets of St. Petersburg	St. Petersburg, Florida
2	March 8–10	The Andersen Companies Grand Prix of St. Petersburg	R Streets of St. Petersburg	St. Petersburg, Florida
3	April 5–7	Continental Tire Grand Prix of Louisiana	R NOLA Motorsports Park	Avondale, Louisiana
4	April 5–7	Continental Tire Grand Prix of Louisiana	R NOLA Motorsports Park	Avondale, Louisiana
5	April 5–7	Continental Tire Grand Prix of Louisiana	R NOLA Motorsports Park	Avondale, Louisiana
6	May 9–11	Continental Tire Grand Prix of Indianapolis	R Indianapolis Motor Speedway Road Course	Speedway, Indiana
7	May 9–11	Continental Tire Grand Prix of Indianapolis	R Indianapolis Motor Speedway Road Course	Speedway, Indiana
8	May 23–25	USF2000 Continental Tire Freedom 75	O Lucas Oil Indianapolis Raceway Park	Brownsburg, Indiana
9	June 6–9	Elite Engines Grand Prix of Road America	R Road America	Elkhart Lake, Wisconsin
10	June 6–9	Elite Engines Grand Prix of Road America	R Road America	Elkhart Lake, Wisconsin
11	July 4–7	Tatuus Grand Prix of Mid-Ohio	R Mid-Ohio Sports Car Course	Lexington, Ohio
12	July 4–7	Tatuus Grand Prix of Mid-Ohio	R Mid-Ohio Sports Car Course	Lexington, Ohio
13	July 4–7	Tatuus Grand Prix of Mid-Ohio	R Mid-Ohio Sports Car Course	Lexington, Ohio
14	July 19–21	Continental Tire Grand Prix of Toronto	R Exhibition Place	Toronto, Ontario
15	July 19–21	Continental Tire Grand Prix of Toronto	R Exhibition Place	Toronto, Ontario
16	August 22–25	Continental Tire Grand Prix of Portland	R Portland International Raceway	Portland, Oregon
17	August 22–25	Continental Tire Grand Prix of Portland	R Portland International Raceway	Portland, Oregon
18	August 22–25	Continental Tire Grand Prix of Portland	R Portland International Raceway	Portland, Oregon

== Race results ==
Rd.	Track	Pole position	Fastest lap	Most laps led	Race winner	
Rd.	Track	Pole position	Fastest lap	Most laps led	Driver	Team
1	Streets of St. Petersburg	(United States) Max Garcia	(United States) Max Garcia	(United States) Evagoras Papasavvas	(United States) Max Garcia	Pabst Racing
2	Streets of St. Petersburg	(United States) Max Garcia	(United States) Elliot Cox	(United States) Max Garcia	(United States) Max Garcia	Pabst Racing
3	NOLA Motorsports Park	(United States) Joey Brienza	(United States) Max Garcia	(United States) Max Garcia	(United States) Max Garcia	Pabst Racing
4	NOLA Motorsports Park	(United States) Max Garcia	(Canada) Nico Christodoulou	(United States) Sam Corry (United States) Hudson Schwartz	(United States) Sam Corry	Pabst Racing
5	NOLA Motorsports Park	(United States) Max Garcia	(Canada) Nico Christodoulou	(Canada) Nico Christodoulou	(Canada) Nico Christodoulou	Velocity Racing Development
6	Indianapolis Motor Speedway Road Course	(United States) Evan Cooley	(United States) Evan Cooley	(United States) Max Taylor	(United States) Max Taylor	Velocity Racing Development
7	Indianapolis Motor Speedway Road Course	(United States) Evan Cooley	(United States) Evan Cooley	(United States) Evan Cooley	(United States) Max Garcia	Pabst Racing
8	Lucas Oil Indianapolis Raceway Park	(Brazil) Nicolas Giaffone	(United States) Tanner DeFabis	(United States) Tanner DeFabis	(United States) Tanner DeFabis	Jay Howard Driver Development
9	Road America	(United States) Max Garcia	(United States) Sam Corry	(United States) Max Garcia	(United States) Sam Corry	Pabst Racing
10	Road America	(United States) Max Taylor	(United States) Max Taylor	(United States) Max Taylor	(United States) Max Taylor	Velocity Racing Development
11	Mid-Ohio Sports Car Course	(United States) Evagoras Papasavvas	(United States) Max Taylor	(United States) Max Taylor	(United States) Max Taylor	Velocity Racing Development
12	Mid-Ohio Sports Car Course	(United States) Evagoras Papasavvas	(United States) Thomas Schrage	(United States) Evagoras Papasavvas	(United States) Evagoras Papasavvas	Jay Howard Driver Development
13	Mid-Ohio Sports Car Course	(United States) Thomas Schrage	(United States) Carson Etter	(United States) Max Taylor	(United States) Max Taylor	Velocity Racing Development
14	Exhibition Place	(United States) Max Garcia	(United States) Sam Corry	(United States) Sam Corry	(United States) Sam Corry	Pabst Racing
15	Exhibition Place	(United Kingdom) Liam McNeilly	(United States) Evagoras Papasavvas	(United States) Evagoras Papasavvas	(United States) Evagoras Papasavvas	Jay Howard Driver Development
16	Portland International Raceway	(United States) Max Garcia	(United States) Michael Costello	(United States) Michael Costello	(United States) Michael Costello	Jay Howard Driver Development
17	Portland International Raceway	(United States) Thomas Schrage	(United States) Thomas Schrage	(United States) Elliot Cox	(United States) Max Garcia	Pabst Racing
18	Portland International Raceway	(United States) Thomas Schrage	(United States) Michael Costello	(United States) Elliot Cox (United States) G3 Argyros	(United States) G3 Argyros	Jay Howard Driver Development

== Championship standings ==
=== Drivers' Championship ===
Scoring system

Position	**1st**	**2nd**	**3rd**	**4th**	**5th**	**6th**	**7th**	**8th**	**9th**	**10th**	**11th**	**12th**	**13th**	**14th**	**15th**	**16th**	**17th**	**18th**	**19th**	**20th+**
Points	30	25	22	19	17	15	14	13	12	11	10	9	8	7	6	5	4	3	2	1
Points (O)	45	38	33	29	26	23	21	20	18	17	15	14	12	11	9	8	6	5	3	2

- The driver who qualified on pole was awarded one additional point.
- One point was awarded to the driver who led the most laps in a race.
- One point was awarded to the driver who set the fastest lap during the race

Pos.	Driver	STP		NOLA			IMS		IRP	ROA		MOH			TOR		POR			Points
1	(United States) Max Garcia	**1**	**1***	1*	**3**	**4**	6	1	7	**4***	6	2	4	4	**3**	4	**2**	1	2	428
2	(United States) Sam Corry	3	2	4	1*	7	5	9	11	1*	4	4	8	3	1*	3	7	6	7	355
3	(United States) Max Taylor	18	15	5	6	3	1*	2	17	3	**1***	1*	5	1*	2	5	17	4	6	343
4	(United States) Evagoras Papasavvas	2*	3	2	2	2	4	19	3	21	5	**8**	**1***	14	12	1*	6	5	15	326
5	(United States) Joey Brienza	10	8	**3**	5	5	2	22	9	2	3	9	6	5	10	8	12	10	5	265
6	(United States) Elliot Cox	4	4	12	13	16	7	3	6	5	14	6	3	15	5	6	14	2*	12*	264
7	(Brazil) Nicolas Giaffone	11	21	7	8	17	17	5	**2**	18	7	3	7	6	6	9	4	8	3	245
8	(United States) Hudson Schwartz	20	9	6	4*	6	20	6	10	7	9	5	10	7	7	7	3	17	13	226
9	(United States) Michael Costello	5	19	17	17	10	9	7	8	8	2	17	2	18	17	10	1*	7	14	218
10	(Australia) Quinn Armstrong	7	7	9	9	9	22	20	4	20	20	18	12	9	8	15	5	9	8	184
11	(United States) Ayrton Houk	9	16	8	12	13	11	4	16	6	10	15	9	8			11	14	16	161
12	(United States) Thomas Schrage	13	6	19	18	8	15	17				13	18	**2**	18	12	10	**3**	**4**	156
13	(United States) Brady Golan	17	13	14	11	14	8	11	18	11	12	7	17	17	15	11	9	12	11	154
14	(Brazil) Lucas Fecury	16	17	18	10	20	14	13	14	10	11	10	11	10	16	14	13	11	9	146
15	(United States) Maxwell Jamieson	15	11	11	16	11	13	8	13	19	17	11	14	11	11	18	15	16	17	135
16	(United States) Carson Etter	19	12	10	20	19	12	10	15	13	21	14	15	13	19	13	16	13	10	121
17	(United States) G3 Argyros						21	12	12	9	8				9	20	8	16	1*	112
18	(United States) Tanner DeFabis	21	14	13	15	12	10	21	1*	17	15									103
19	(Canada) Nico Christodoulou	6	5	16	7	1*	19	16												92
20	(Australia) Xavier Kokai	14	10	15	14	18	18	18	5	16	13	Wth	Wth	Wth						80
21	(United States) Evan Cooley						**3**	**15***							4	16				57
22	(United States) Giovanni Cabrera						16	14		15	19	12	13	12						46
23	(United Kingdom) Liam McNeilly														13	**2**				34
24	(United States) Jace Bacon									14	18	16	16	16	20	19				26
25	(United States) Cole Kleck	12	20	20	19	15														19
26	(United States) Jack Jeffers	8	18																	16
27	(Canada) Anthony Martella									12	16									14
28	(Australia) Eddie Beswick														14	17				11
Pos.	Driver	STP		NOLA			IMS		IRP	ROA		MOH			TOR		POR			Points

Color	Result
Gold	Winner
Silver	2nd place
Bronze	3rd place
Green	4th & 5th place
Light Blue	6th–10th place
Dark Blue	Finished (Outside Top 10)
Purple	Did not finish
Red	Did not qualify (DNQ)
Brown	Withdrawn (Wth)
Black	Disqualified (DSQ)
White	Did not start (DNS)
Blank	Did not participate

**In-line notation**
**Bold**	Pole position (1 point)
Italics	Ran fastest race lap (1 point)
*	Led most race laps (1 point); Not awarded if more than one driver led most laps
Rookie

=== Teams' championship ===
Scoring system

Position	**1st**	**2nd**	**3rd**	**4th**	**5th**	**6th**	**7th**	**8th**	**9th**	**10th+**
Points	22	18	15	12	10	8	6	4	2	1

- Single car teams received 3 bonus points per race as an equivalency to multi-car teams
- Only the best two results counted for teams fielding more than two entries

Pos	Team	STP		NOLA			IMS	IRP	ROA	MOH	TOR	POR	Points
1	Pabst Racing	1	1	1	1	4							162
1	Pabst Racing	3	2	6	3	6							162
2	Jay Howard Driver Development	2	3	2	2	2							101
2	Jay Howard Driver Development	5	12	12	14	10							101
3	Velocity Racing Development	6	5	5	5	1							92
3	Velocity Racing Development	12	9	15	6	3							92
4	Exclusive Autosport	8	6	3	16	5							49
4	Exclusive Autosport	10	8	19	18	8							49
5	Sarah Fisher Hartman Racing Development	4	4	11	12	16							42
6	DEForce Racing	7	7	8	7	9							32
6	DEForce Racing	11	10	10	8	11							32
7	DC Autosport	9	11	7	11	13							17
7	DC Autosport	13	13	9	20	19							17
Pos	Team	STP		NOLA			IMS	IRP	ROA	MOH	TOR	POR	Points

== See also ==
- 2024 IndyCar Series
- 2024 Indy NXT
- 2024 USF Pro 2000 Championship
- 2024 USF Juniors
