= Brady Golan =

American racing driver (born 2007)

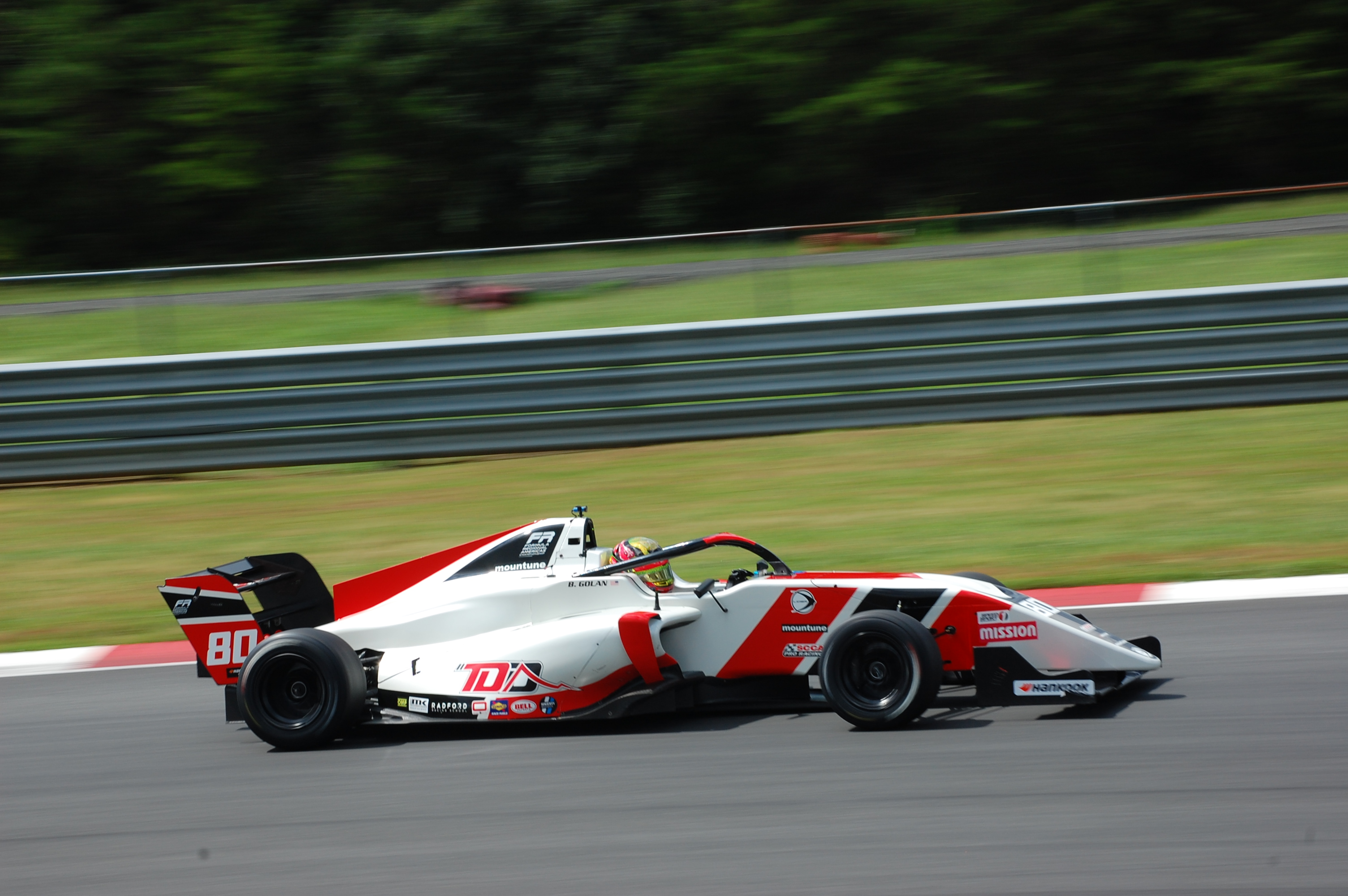
- Golan at New Jersey Motorsports Park in 2025
- Nationality: (United States) American
- Born: September 10, 2007 (age 19) Houston, Texas, United States

USF Pro 2000 Championship career
- Debut season: 2024
- Current team: DEForce Racing
- Categorisation: FIA Silver
- Car number: 18
- Starts: 10
- Wins: 0
- Podiums: 0
- Poles: 0
- Fastest laps: 0
- Best finish: 18th in 2024

Previous series
- 2025 2024–2025 2024 2023–2024 2023–2024 2023–2025 2022: Le Mans Cup; FR Americas; Lamborghini Super Trofeo North America; USF Juniors; Michelin Pilot Challenge; USF2000 Championship; Formula 4 United States Championship

Brady Golan (born September 10, 2007) is an American racing driver who currently competes in the USF Pro 2000 Championship driving for Turn 3 Motorsport.

== Career ==
=== USF Juniors ===
==== 2023 ====
In 2023, Golan would compete full-time in the 2023 USF Juniors driving for DEForce Racing. He would finish tenth in the standings.

==== 2024 ====
Golan returned for the 2024 season, once again driving for DEForce Racing. He would finish twelfth in the standings.

=== USF2000 Championship ===
==== 2023 ====
Mid-way through the 2023 USF2000 Championship, Golan made his series debut at the Mid-Ohio round. He had a best finish of 12th in race two.

==== 2024 ====
Alongside his campaign in the 2024 USF Juniors, Golan signed with DEForce Racing for a full-time campaign in the 2024 USF2000 Championship. He would finish thirteenth in the standings.

=== Formula Regional Americas ===
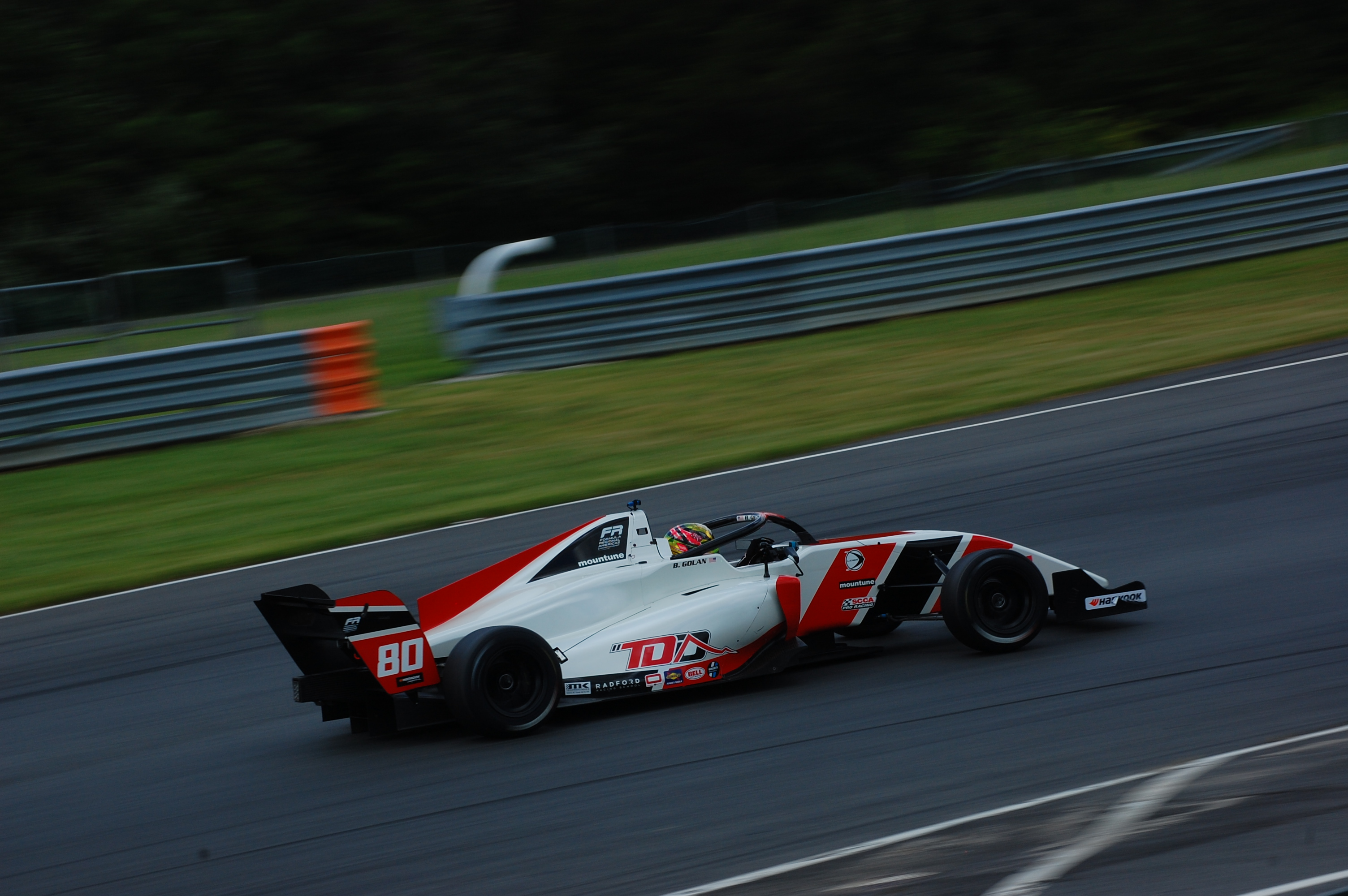
Golan at New Jersey Motorsports Park in 2025

==== 2024 ====
Alongside his campaigns in the Road to Indy, Golan competed in one round of the 2024 Formula Regional Americas Championship at Circuit of the Americas with Toney Driver Development. Golan retired from the race one and finished in second place in race two. He was sixteenth in the standings with eighteen points.

==== 2025 ====
Golan re-signed with Toney Driver Development for a full-time campaign in the 2025 Formula Regional Americas Championship.

=== USF Pro 2000 Championship ===
==== 2025 ====
On May 6, 2025, it was announced that Golan would join the 2025 USF Pro 2000 Championship grid with Turn 3 Motorsport starting from the Indianapolis Motor Speedway round, replacing Titus Sherlock.

==== 2026 ====
Golan will continue with Turn 3 Motorsport for the full 2026 USF Pro 2000 Championship.

== Sportscar racing ==
=== Michelin Pilot Challenge ===
==== 2024 ====
Golan joined the 2024 Michelin Pilot Challenge in the first round at Daytona International Speedway to drive for Kellymoss with Riley alongside co-drivers Riley Dickinson and Michael McCarthy. The trio would go on to win the race and Golan was his first in the series.

=== IMSA VP Racing SportsCar Challenge ===
==== 2025 ====
In 2025, Golan shifted to the IMSA VP Racing SportsCar Challenge for the 2025 season. He would drive the No. 80 Ligier JS P320 for Toney Driver Development in the LMP3 class. In his debut race, Golan finished on the podium in second behind race winner Valentino Catalano.

== Racing record ==
=== Racing career summary ===
Season	Series	Team	Races	Wins	Poles	F/Laps	Podiums	Points	Position
2022	Formula 4 United States Championship	DEForce Racing	3	0	0	0	0	0	35th
2022	Skip Barber Formula Race Series	N/A	2	0	0	0	0	51	17th
2023	USF Juniors	DEForce Racing	16	0	0	0	0	202	10th
2023	USF2000 Championship	DEForce Racing	3	0	0	0	0	21	28th
2023	Michelin Pilot Challenge - GS	CarBahn with Peregrine Racing	1	0	0	0	0	40	68th
2024	Michelin Pilot Challenge - GS	Kellymoss with Riley	1	1	0	0	1	350	40th
2024	USF Juniors	DEForce Racing	16	0	0	0	0	128	12th
2024	USF2000 Championship	DEForce Racing	18	0	0	0	0	154	13rd
2024	Lamborghini Super Trofeo North America	Forte Racing	2	0	0	0	0	13	13rd
2024	Formula Regional Americas Championship	Toney Driver Development	2	0	0	0	1	18	16th
2025	USF2000 Championship	DEForce Racing	5	0	0	0	0	31	23rd
2025	Formula Regional Americas Championship	Toney Driver Development	20	2	1	0	5	198	5th
2025	IMSA VP Racing SportsCar Challenge - LMP3	Toney Driver Development	2	0	0	1	1	560	12nd
2025	USF Pro 2000 Championship	Turn 3 Motorsport	10	0	0	0	0	89	18th
2025	Le Mans Cup - LMP3	Inter Europol Competition	1	0	0	0	0	0	NC†
2026	IMSA VP Racing SportsCar Challenge - LMP3	Toney Driver Development	2	0	0	1	1	530	24th
2026	Formula Regional Americas Championship	Toney Driver Development	20	8	3	4	14	298.5	**1st**
2026	USF Pro 2000 Championship	Turn 3 Motorsport	16	0	0	0	0	214	9th
2026	USF2000 Championship	DEForce Racing	2	0	0	0	0	19	29th

* Season still in progress.

=== American open-wheel racing results ===
==== Formula 4 United States Championship ====
(key) (Races in bold indicate pole position) (Races in italics indicate fastest lap)

Year	Team	1	2	3	4	5	6	7	8	9	10	11	12	13	14	15	16	17	18	Pos	Points
2022	DEForce Racing	NOL; 1	NOL; 2	NOL; 3	ROA; 1	ROA; 2	ROA; 3	MOH; 1	MOH; 2	MOH; 3	NJM; 1	NJM; 2	NJM; 3	VIR; 1	VIR; 2	VIR; 3	COA; 1; 19	COA; 2; 23	COA; 3; 16	35th	0

==== USF Juniors ====
(key) (Races in bold indicate pole position) (Races in italics indicate fastest lap) (Races with * indicate most race laps led)

Year	Team	1	2	3	4	5	6	7	8	9	10	11	12	13	14	15	16	Rank	Points
2023	DEForce Racing	SEB; 1; 9	SEB; 2; 8	SEB; 3; 7	ALA; 1; 10	ALA; 2; 11	VIR; 1; 9	VIR; 2; 4	VIR; 3; 8	MOH; 1; 12	MOH; 2; 8	ROA; 1; 7	ROA; 2; 8	ROA; 3; 10	COA; 1; 8	COA; 2; 10	COA; 3; 7	10th	202
2024	DEForce Racing	NOL; 1; 15	NOL; 2; 19	NOL; 3; 20	ALA; 1; 12	ALA; 2; 20	VIR; 1; 22	VIR; 2; 7	VIR; 3; 9	MOH; 1; 19	MOH; 2; 8	ROA; 1; 10	ROA; 2; 9	ROA; 3; 9	POR; 1; 4	POR; 2; 11	POR; 3; 18	12th	128

==== USF2000 Championship ====
(key) (Races in bold indicate pole position) (Races in italics indicate fastest lap) (Races with * indicate most race laps led)

Year	Team	1	2	3	4	5	6	7	8	9	10	11	12	13	14	15	16	17	18	Rank	Points
2023	DEForce Racing	STP; 1	STP; 2	SEB; 1	SEB; 1	IMS; 1	IMS; 2	IMS; 3	IRP	ROA; 1	ROA; 2	MOH; 1; 17	MOH; 2; 12	MOH; 3; 13	TOR; 1	TOR; 2	POR; 1	POR; 2	POR; 3	28th	21
2024	DEForce Racing	STP; 1; 17	STP; 2; 13	NOL; 1; 14	NOL; 2; 11	NOL; 3; 14	IMS; 1; 8	IMS; 2; 11	IRP; 18	ROA; 1; 11	ROA; 2; 12	MOH; 1; 7	MOH; 2; 17	MOH; 3; 17	TOR; 1; 15	TOR; 2; 11	POR; 1; 9	POR; 2; 12	POR; 3; 11	13th	154
2025	DEForce Racing	STP; 1; 13	STP; 2; 12	NOL; 1; 13	NOL; 2; 17	NOL; 3; 19	IMS; 1	IMS; 2	IRP	ROA; 1	ROA; 2	MOH; 1	MOH; 2	MOH; 3	TOR; 1	TOR; 2	POR; 1	POR; 2	POR; 3	23rd	31
2026	DEForce Racing	STP; 1; 19	STP; 2; 5	IMS; 1	IMS; 2	IMS; 3	IRP	ROA1; 1	ROA1; 2	ROA1; 3	MOH; 1	MOH; 2	POR; 1	POR; 2	MAR; 1	MAR; 2	ROA2; 1	ROA2; 2	ROA2; 3	27th*	19*

==== USF Pro 2000 Championship ====
(key) (Races in bold indicate pole position) (Races in italics indicate fastest lap)

Year	Team	1	2	3	4	5	6	7	8	9	10	11	12	13	14	15	16	17	18	Position	Points
2025	Turn 3 Motorsport	STP; 1	STP; 2	LOU; 1	LOU; 2	LOU; 3	IMS; 1; 16	IMS; 2; 19	IMS; 3; 21	IRP; 5	ROA; 1	ROA; 2	ROA; 3	MOH; 1; 11	MOH; 2; 11	TOR; 1; 9	TOR; 2; 13	POR; 1; 12	POR; 2; 15	18th	89
2026	Turn 3 Motorsport	ARL; 1; 6	ARL; 2; 6	IMS; 1; 6	IMS; 2; 12	IRP; 5	ROA; 1	ROA; 2	MOH; 1; 13	MOH; 2; 8	MOH; 3; 6	POR; 1; 5	POR; 2; 7	MAR; 1; 6	MAR; 2; 12	MIL; 9	ROA; 1; 15	ROA; 2; 11	ROA; 3; 12	9th	214

* Season still in progress.

==== Formula Regional Americas Championship ====
(key) (Races in bold indicate pole position) (Races in italics indicate fastest lap)

Year	Team	1	2	3	4	5	6	7	8	9	10	11	12	13	14	15	16	17	18	19	20	21	22	DC	Points
2024	Toney Driver Development	NOL; 1	NOL; 2	NOL; 3	LAG; 1	LAG; 2	ROA; 1	ROA; 2	ROA; 3	IMS; 1	IMS; 2	IMS; 3	MOH; 1	MOH; 2	NJM; 1	NJM; 2	NJM; 3	MOS; 1	MOS; 2	MOS; 3	COT; 1 Ret	COT; 2; 2		16th	18
2025	Toney Driver Development	NOL; 1; 8	NOL; 2; 1	NOL; 3; 5	ROA; 1; 4	ROA; 2; 8	ROA; 3; 3	IMS; 1 C	**IMS**; **2**; 9†	IMS; 3; 6	MOH; 1; 6	MOH; 2; 8	MOH; 3; 4	NJM; 1; 7	NJM; 2; 5	NJM; 3 C	MOS; 1; 4	MOS; 2; 5	MOS; 3; 6	VIR; 1; 2	VIR; 2 Ret	BAR; 1; 1	BAR; 2; 2	5th	198

* Season still in progress.

=== Complete IMSA VP Racing SportsCar Challenge results ===
(key) (Races in bold indicate pole position; races in italics indicate fastest lap)

Year	Entrant	Class	Make	Engine	1	2	3	4	5	6	7	8	9	10	11	12	Rank	Points
2025	Toney Driver Development	LMP3	Ligier JS P320	Nissan VK56DE 5.6 L V8	DAY; 1; 2	DAY; 2; 7	COT; 1	COT; 2	MOH; 1	MOH; 2	MOS; 1	MOS; 2	VIR; 1	VIR; 2	ATL; 1	ATL; 2	8th*	560*
