= Nicolas Giaffone =

Brazilian racing driver

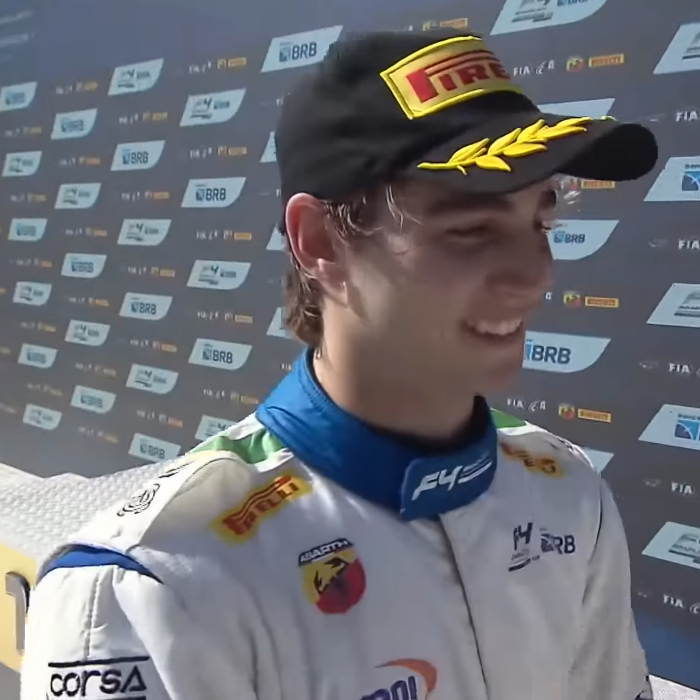
- Giaffone in 2022.
- Nationality: (Brazil) Brazilian
- Born: Nicolas Reuter Giaffone; 6 October 2004 (age 22) São Paulo, Brazil
- Relatives: Felipe Giaffone (father)

USF2000 Championship career
- Debut season: 2024
- Current team: DEForce Racing
- Car number: 1
- Starts: 18 (18 entries)
- Wins: 0
- Podiums: 2
- Poles: 1
- Fastest laps: 0
- Best finish: 7th in 2024

Previous series
- 2023 2022: USF Juniors; F4 Brazilian Championship

Championship titles
- 2023: USF Juniors

Nicolas Reuter "Nic" Giaffone (born 6 October 2004) is a Brazilian racing driver. He most recently competed in the 2024 USF2000 Championship driving for DEForce Racing.

== Career ==
=== USF Juniors ===
On 5 January 2023, Giaffone competed in the 2023 USF Juniors driving for DEForce Racing. At the second race of the season, at Sebring International Raceway, he would get his maiden win in the championship. Giaffone would also finish second in race 3 of the first round.

At the second round at Barber Motorsports Park, Giaffone would take pole for both races. He would dominate and win both races, resulting in him taking the championship lead. Giaffone would continue his win streak by winning the next two races at Virginia International Raceway. He would qualify on pole for race 3 at VIR, but would finish second after Jack Jeffers went on a late charge to take the win. At Mid-Ohio, Giaffone would once again be on pole for race one and go on to win the race. This would be his final win of the season. Giaffone would collect two more podiums at Road America. With his large lead in the championship, he could clinch the title with a few races remaining. After finishing third and seventh in races one and two at the Circuit of the Americas respectively, Giaffone would become the 2023 USF Juniors champion. As a result of winning the title, he was awarded the champion scholarship to move up to the next rung in the USF Pro Championships, the USF2000 Championship.

=== USF2000 Championship ===
In December 2023, it was announced that Giaffone would move up to the USF2000 Championship and drive for DEForce Racing.

=== Copa Truck ===
In 2024, Giaffone was announced by his own father, Felipe, as his newest partner on R9 Competições, on Copa Truck, in 2025.

== Karting record ==
=== Karting career summary ===
Season	Series	Team	Position
2018	Rotax Max Challenge Grand Finals – Junior	Lucas Zacante de Souza	51st
2018	Rotax Max Challenge South America – Junior Max		1st
2019	Rotax Max Challenge Brazil – Junior		2nd

== Racing record ==
=== Racing career summary ===
Season	Series	Team	Races	Wins	Poles	F/Laps	Podiums	Points	Position
2022	F4 Brazilian Championship	Cavaleiro Sports	18	3	0	1	6	129	5th
2023	USF Juniors	DEForce Racing	16	6	5	8	11	389	**1st**
2024	USF2000 Championship	DEForce Racing	18	0	1	0	3	245	7th
2025	Copa Truck season - Super Truck Elite	R9 Competições	18	3	3	2	7	225	4th

* Season still in progress.

=== Complete F4 Brazilian Championship results ===
(key) (Races in bold indicate pole position) (Races in italics indicate fastest lap)

Year	Team	1	2	3	4	5	6	7	8	9	10	11	12	13	14	15	16	17	18	DC	Points
2022	Cavaleiro Sports	MOG1; 1; 3	MOG1; 2; 7	MOG1; 3; 10	INT1; 1; 3	INT1; 2; 1	INT1; 3; 10	INT2; 1 DSQ	INT2; 2; 6	INT2; 3; 5	MOG2; 1; 8	MOG2; 2; 1	MOG2; 3 Ret	GYN; 1; 5	GYN; 2; 1	GYN; 3; 9	INT3; 1; 6	INT3; 2; 2	INT3; 3 Ret	5th	129

=== American open-wheel racing results ===
==== USF Juniors ====
(key) (Races in bold indicate pole position) (Races in italics indicate fastest lap) (Races with * indicate most race laps led)

Year	Team	1	2	3	4	5	6	7	8	9	10	11	12	13	14	15	16	Rank	Points
2023	DEForce Racing	SEB; 1; 4	SEB; 2; 1	SEB; 3; 2	**ALA**; **1**; 1*	**ALA**; **2**; 1*	VIR; 1; 1	VIR; 2; 1*	**VIR**; **3**; 2*	**MOH**; **1**; 1*	MOH; 2; 14	ROA; 1; 6	ROA; 2; 2	**ROA**; **3**; 2*	COA; 1; 3	COA; 2; 7	COA; 3; 8	1st	389

==== USF2000 Championship ====
(key) (Races in bold indicate pole position) (Races in italics indicate fastest lap) (Races with * indicate most race laps led)

Year	Team	1	2	3	4	5	6	7	8	9	10	11	12	13	14	15	16	17	18	Rank	Points
2024	DEForce Racing	STP; 1; 11	STP; 2; 21	NOL; 1; 7	NOL; 2; 8	NOL; 3; 17	IMS; 1; 17	IMS; 2; 5	**IRP**; 2	ROA; 1; 18	ROA; 2; 7	MOH; 1; 3	MOH; 2; 7	MOH; 3; 6	TOR; 1; 6	TOR; 2; 9	POR; 1; 4	POR; 2; 8	POR; 3; 3	7th	245
