= 2023 USF Juniors =

Racing season

The 2023 USF Juniors championship was the second season of USF Juniors. The season features a six-round 16-race calendar, which began on March 23 at Sebring International Raceway and concluded on August 27 at the Circuit of the Americas.

When the top rung of the Road to Indy ladder system, Indy Lights, was bought by Penske Entertainment (owners of INDYCAR) in 2021 and the lower level series changed sanctioning to the United States Auto Club, changes were made to the other championships in the ladder. This, together with the Indy Lights being rebranded to Indy NXT, effectively ended the "Road to Indy" branding, with the three championships below Indy NXT now collectively called "USF Pro Championships Presented by Cooper Tires". The USF Juniors serves as the bottom rung of this ladder.

== Drivers and teams ==
Team	No.	Drivers	Rounds
(United States) DC Autosport	46	(Australia) Connor Roberts	14–16
(United States) DC Autosport	57	(United States) Carson Etter	All
(United States) DC Autosport	68	(United States) Ethan Ho	1–10
(United States) DEForce Racing	16	(Australia) Quinn Armstrong	All
(United States) DEForce Racing	17	(Brazil) Lucas Fecury	All
(United States) DEForce Racing	18	(United States) Brady Golan	All
(United States) DEForce Racing	19	(Brazil) Nicolas Giaffone	All
(United States) Exclusive Autosport	90	(Brazil) Erick Schotten	All
(United States) Exclusive Autosport	91	(United States) Joey Brienza	All
(United States) Exclusive Autosport	92	(United States) Jack Jeffers	All
(United States) Exclusive Autosport	93	(United States) Giovanni Cabrera	All
(United States) Exclusive Autosport	95	(Philippines) Bianca Bustamante	14–16
(United States) Jay Howard Driver Development	3	(Canada) Ayden Ingratta	11–13
(United States) Jay Howard Driver Development	3	(United States) Aiden Potter	14–16
(United States) Jay Howard Driver Development	4	(United States) Hudson Potter	11–16
(United States) Jay Howard Driver Development	5	(United States) Ava Dobson	11–13
(United States) Jay Howard Driver Development	5	(United States) Dane Scott	14–16
(Mexico) Ram Racing	55	(Colombia) Juan Felipe Pedraza	4–5
(United States) Velocity Racing Development	12	(United States) Ethan Barker	All
(United States) Velocity Racing Development	29	(United States) Hudson Schwartz	4–16
(United States) Velocity Racing Development	33	(United States) Max Taylor	All
(United States) Velocity Racing Development	48	(United States) Jimmie Lockhart	All

== Schedule ==
Round	Date	Race name	Circuit	Location
1	March 23–25	Cooper Tires Grand Prix of Sebring	Sebring International Raceway	Sebring, FL
2	March 23–25	Cooper Tires Grand Prix of Sebring	Sebring International Raceway	Sebring, FL
3	March 23–25	Cooper Tires Grand Prix of Sebring	Sebring International Raceway	Sebring, FL
4	April 27–28	Cooper Tires Grand Prix of Alabama	Barber Motorsports Park	Birmingham, AL
5	April 27–28	Cooper Tires Grand Prix of Alabama	Barber Motorsports Park	Birmingham, AL
6	June 2–4	Cooper Tires VIR Grand Prix	Virginia International Raceway	Alton, VA
7	June 2–4	Cooper Tires VIR Grand Prix	Virginia International Raceway	Alton, VA
8	June 2–4	Cooper Tires VIR Grand Prix	Virginia International Raceway	Alton, VA
9	July 6–8	Cooper Tires Grand Prix of Mid-Ohio	Mid-Ohio Sports Car Course	Lexington, OH
10	July 6–8	Cooper Tires Grand Prix of Mid-Ohio	Mid-Ohio Sports Car Course	Lexington, OH
11	August 11–13	Cooper Tires Grand Prix of Road America	Road America	Elkhart Lake, WI
12	August 11–13	Cooper Tires Grand Prix of Road America	Road America	Elkhart Lake, WI
13	August 11–13	Cooper Tires Grand Prix of Road America	Road America	Elkhart Lake, WI
14	August 24–27	Cooper Tires Circuit of The Americas Grand Prix	Circuit of the Americas	Austin, TX
15	August 24–27	Cooper Tires Circuit of The Americas Grand Prix	Circuit of the Americas	Austin, TX
16	August 24–27	Cooper Tires Circuit of The Americas Grand Prix	Circuit of the Americas	Austin, TX

== Race results ==
Rd.	Track	Pole position	Fastest lap	Most laps led	Race winner	
Rd.	Track	Pole position	Fastest lap	Most laps led	Driver	Team
1	Sebring International Raceway	(United States) Joey Brienza	(United States) Joey Brienza	(Australia) Quinn Armstrong	(Australia) Quinn Armstrong	DEForce Racing
2	Sebring International Raceway	(United States) Joey Brienza	(Brazil) Nicolas Giaffone	(United States) Joey Brienza	(Brazil) Nicolas Giaffone	DEForce Racing
3	Sebring International Raceway	(United States) Joey Brienza	(United States) Jimmie Lockhart	(United States) Joey Brienza	(United States) Joey Brienza	Exclusive Autosport
4	Barber Motorsports Park	(Brazil) Nicolas Giaffone	(Brazil) Nicolas Giaffone	(Brazil) Nicolas Giaffone	(Brazil) Nicolas Giaffone	DEForce Racing
5	Barber Motorsports Park	(Brazil) Nicolas Giaffone	(Brazil) Nicolas Giaffone	(Brazil) Nicolas Giaffone	(Brazil) Nicolas Giaffone	DEForce Racing
6	Virginia International Raceway	(United States) Ethan Ho	(United States) Max Taylor	(United States) Jack Jeffers	(Brazil) Nicolas Giaffone	DEForce Racing
7	Virginia International Raceway	(United States) Jack Jeffers	(Brazil) Nicolas Giaffone	(Brazil) Nicolas Giaffone	(Brazil) Nicolas Giaffone	DEForce Racing
8	Virginia International Raceway	(Brazil) Nicolas Giaffone	(United States) Jack Jeffers	(Brazil) Nicolas Giaffone	(United States) Jack Jeffers	Exclusive Autosport
9	Mid-Ohio Sports Car Course	(Brazil) Nicolas Giaffone	(Brazil) Nicolas Giaffone	(Brazil) Nicolas Giaffone	(Brazil) Nicolas Giaffone	DEForce Racing
10	Mid-Ohio Sports Car Course	(United States) Hudson Schwartz	(United States) Hudson Schwartz	(United States) Hudson Schwartz	(Australia) Quinn Armstrong	DEForce Racing
11	Road America	(Australia) Quinn Armstrong	(Canada) Ayden Ingratta	(Australia) Quinn Armstrong	(Australia) Quinn Armstrong	DEForce Racing
12	Road America	(Canada) Ayden Ingratta	(Brazil) Nicolas Giaffone	(United States) Jack Jeffers	(United States) Jack Jeffers	Exclusive Autosport
13	Road America	(Brazil) Nicolas Giaffone	(United States) Max Taylor	(Brazil) Nicolas Giaffone	(United States) Max Taylor	Velocity Racing Development
14	Circuit of the Americas	(United States) Jack Jeffers	(Brazil) Nicolas Giaffone	(United States) Max Taylor	(United States) Jack Jeffers	Exclusive Autosport
15	Circuit of the Americas	(United States) Jack Jeffers	(Brazil) Nicolas Giaffone	(United States) Jack Jeffers (United States) Jimmie Lockhart	(United States) Jimmie Lockhart	Velocity Racing Development
16	Circuit of the Americas	(United States) Jack Jeffers	(United States) Jack Jeffers	(United States) Jack Jeffers	(United States) Jimmie Lockhart	Velocity Racing Development

== Championship standings ==
=== Drivers' Championship ===
Scoring system

Position	**1st**	**2nd**	**3rd**	**4th**	**5th**	**6th**	**7th**	**8th**	**9th**	**10th**	**11th**	**12th**	**13th**	**14th**	**15th**	**16th**	**17th**	**18th**	**19th**	**20th+**
Points	30	25	22	19	17	15	14	13	12	11	10	9	8	7	6	5	4	3	2	1

- The driver who qualifies on pole is awarded one additional point.
- One point is awarded to the driver who leads the most laps in a race.
- One point is awarded to the driver who sets the fastest lap during the race.

Pos	Driver	SEB			ALA		VIR			MOH		ROA			COA			Points
1	(Brazil) Nicolas Giaffone	4	1	2	**1***	**1***	1	1*	**2***	**1***	14	6	2	**2***	3	7	8	389
2	(Australia) Quinn Armstrong	1*	5	10	2	2	3	14	10	2	1	**1***	5	8	13	2	2	324
3	(United States) Jack Jeffers	3	3	5	15	8	2*	**12**	1	3	4	2	1*	3	**1**	**16***	**14***	313
4	(United States) Jimmie Lockhart	7	10	3	5	3	11	6	4	4	12	9	3	4	4	1*	1	292
5	(United States) Joey Brienza	**2**	**2***	**1***	4	6	14	2	5	6	13	3	9	9	18	3	5	280
6	(United States) Max Taylor	13	13	4	7	5	4	11	3	11	6	13	15	1	2*	14	6	236
7	(United States) Ethan Barker	5	6	13	9	9	8	7	12	7	5	4	10	7	5	5	4	228
8	(United States) Hudson Schwartz				14	12	7	3	14	5	**2***	5	7	5	6	4	3	208
9	(Brazil) Lucas Fecury	6	7	6	3	4	5	5	11	13	7	15	14	12	7	6	17	206
10	(United States) Brady Golan	9	8	7	10	11	9	4	8	12	8	7	8	10	8	10	7	202
11	(Brazil) Erick Schotten	10	9	8	8	10	6	9	6	9	9	8	4	6	17	9	11	199
12	(United States) Carson Etter	11	11	11	12	14	10	13	7	8	11	16	6	15	15	8	13	155
13	(United States) Giovanni Cabrera	12	12	12	13	15	12	8	13	10	10	10	11	16	12	12	18	140
14	(United States) Ethan Ho	8	4	9	6	7	**13**	10	9	14	3							134
15	(United States) Hudson Potter											11	13	13	14	13	12	50
16	(United States) Ava Dobson											12	12	11				28
17	(Philippines) Bianca Bustamante														9	18	9	27
18	(United States) Aiden Potter														11	11	15	26
19	(Australia) Connor Roberts														16	15	10	22
20	(Canada) Ayden Ingratta											14	**16**	14				21
21	(United States) Dane Scott														10	17	16	20
22	(Colombia) Juan Felipe Pedraza				11	13												18

Color	Result
Gold	Winner
Silver	2nd place
Bronze	3rd place
Green	4th & 5th place
Light Blue	6th–10th place
Dark Blue	Finished (Outside Top 10)
Purple	Did not finish
Red	Did not qualify (DNQ)
Brown	Withdrawn (Wth)
Black	Disqualified (DSQ)
White	Did not start (DNS)
Blank	Did not participate

**In-line notation**
**Bold**	Pole position (1 point)
Italics	Ran fastest race lap (1 point)
*	Led most race laps (1 point); Not awarded if more than one driver leads most laps
Rookie

== See also ==
- 2023 IndyCar Series
- 2023 Indy NXT
- 2023 USF Pro 2000 Championship
- 2023 USF2000 Championship
