= G3 Argyros =

American racing driver (born 2009)

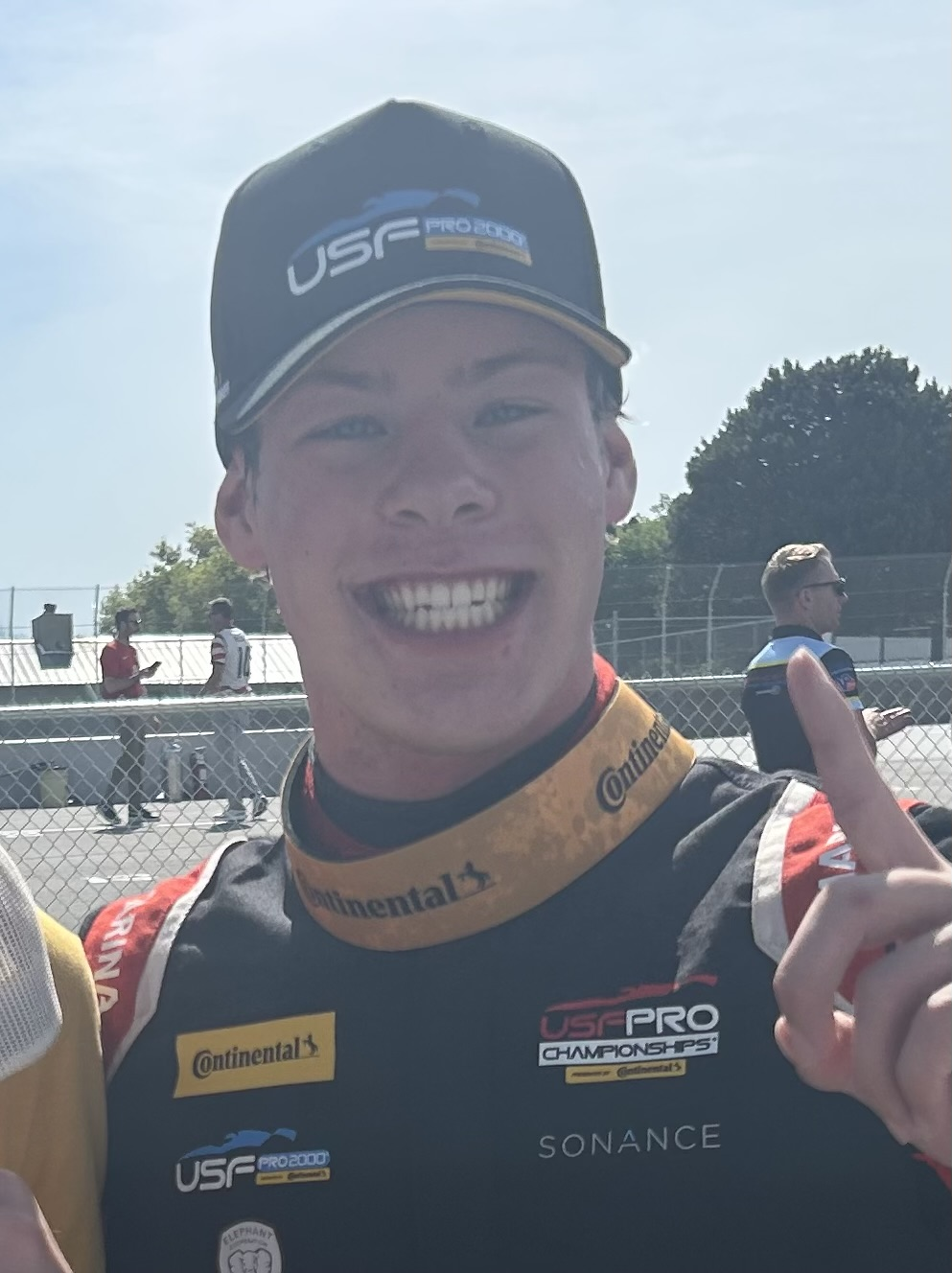
- Argyros at Road America in 2026
- Nationality: (United States) American
- Born: George Leon Argyros III; September 9, 2009 (age 17) Newport Beach, California, U.S.
- Relatives: George Argyros (grandfather)

USF Pro 2000 Championship career
- Debut season: 2026
- Current team: Pabst Racing
- Car number: 18
- Starts: 7
- Wins: 2
- Podiums: 3
- Poles: 1
- Fastest laps: 1
- Best finish: TBA in 2026

Previous series
- 2024—2025 2024 2024: USF2000 Championship; USF Juniors; YACademy Winter Series

George Leon Argyros III (born September 9, 2009), commonly known as G3 Argyros, is an American racing driver who competes in the 2026 USF Pro 2000 Championship driving for Pabst Racing. He previously competed in the USF Juniors and the USF2000 Championship.

== Career ==
=== USF Juniors ===
On October 25, 2023, it was announced that Argyros would make his open-wheel racing debut in the 2024 USF Juniors driving for Jay Howard Driver Development. He would get his first podium of the season at Virginia International Raceway finishing third in race 2.

=== USF2000 Championship ===
Mid-way through the 2024 season, Argyros announced that he would compete in three rounds of the 2024 USF2000 Championship; Indianapolis, Lucas Oil Indianapolis Raceway Park, and Toronto.

=== USF Pro 2000 Championship ===
For 2026, he would compete in the 2026 USF Pro 2000 Championship for Pabst Racing. He earned at podium at Arlington. He swept the first weekend at Road America with wins.

== Personal life ==
Argyros is the grandson of the former United States Ambassador to Spain and former owner of the Seattle Mariners, George Argyros.

== Karting record ==
=== Karting career summary ===
Season	Series	Position
2019	SKUSA Pro Tour - Micro Swift	10th
2019	SKUSA SuperNationals XXIII - Micro Swift	27th
2020	SKUSA Pro Tour - Micro Swift	29th
2021	SKUSA SuperNationals XXIV - X30 Junior	35th

== Racing record ==
=== Racing career summary ===
Season	Series	Team	Races	Wins	Poles	F/Laps	Podiums	Points	Position
2024	YACademy Winter Series	Jay Howard Driver Development	6	0	0	0	1	0	6th
2024	USF Juniors	Jay Howard Driver Development	16	0	0	0	3	163	7th
2024	USF2000 Championship	Jay Howard Driver Development	10	1	0	0	1	112	17th
2025	USF2000 Championship	Pabst Racing	18	0	0	1	4	289	4th
2026	USF Pro 2000 Championship	Pabst Racing	18	3	1	2	7	359	**3rd**

* Season still in progress.

=== American open-wheel racing results ===
==== USF Juniors ====
(key) (Races in bold indicate pole position) (Races in italics indicate fastest lap) (Races with * indicate most race laps led)

Year	Team	1	2	3	4	5	6	7	8	9	10	11	12	13	14	15	16	Rank	Points
2024	Jay Howard Driver Development	NOL; 1; 7	NOL; 2; 16	NOL; 3; 22	ALA; 1; 11	ALA; 2; 22	VIR; 1; 4	VIR; 2; 3	VIR; 3; 18	MOH; 1; 4*	MOH; 2; 9	ROA; 1; 22	ROA; 2; 2	ROA; 3; 20	POR; 1; 19	POR; 2; 16	POR; 3; 3*	7th	163

==== USF2000 Championship ====
(key) (Races in bold indicate pole position) (Races in italics indicate fastest lap) (Races with * indicate most race laps led)

Year	Team	1	2	3	4	5	6	7	8	9	10	11	12	13	14	15	16	17	18	Rank	Points
2024	Jay Howard Driver Development	STP; 1	STP; 2	NOL; 1	NOL; 2	NOL; 3	IMS; 1; 21	IMS; 2; 12	IRP; 12	ROA; 1; 9	ROA; 2; 8	MOH; 1	MOH; 2	MOH; 3	TOR; 1; 9	TOR; 2; 20	POR; 1; 8	POR; 2; 16	POR; 3; 1*	17th	112
2025	Pabst Racing	STP; 1; 5	STP; 2; 10	NOL; 1; 6	NOL; 2; 18	NOL; 3; 3	IMS; 1; 3	IMS; 2; 4	IRP; 5	ROA; 1; 3	ROA; 2; 5	MOH; 1; 8	MOH; 2; 4	MOH; 3; 9	TOR; 1; 4	TOR; 2; 3	POR; 1; 15	POR; 2; 6	POR; 3; 13	4th	289

==== USF Pro 2000 Championship ====
(key) (Races in bold indicate pole position) (Races in italics indicate fastest lap) (Races with * indicate most race laps led)

Year	Team	1	2	3	4	5	6	7	8	9	10	11	12	13	14	15	16	17	18	Rank	Points
2026	Pabst Racing	ARL; 1; 11	ARL; 2; 2	IMS; 1; 10	IMS; 2; 15	IRP; 8	ROA; 1; 1	**ROA**; **2**; 1*	MOH; 1; 15	MOH; 2; 5	MOH; 3; 4	POR; 1; 1*	POR; 2; 2	MAR; 1; 2	MAR; 2; 11	MIL; 4	ROA; 1; 5	ROA; 2; 4	ROA; 3; 2	3rd	359

* Season still in progress.
