= Ariel Elkin =

Israeli racing driver (born 2007)

- Nationality: (Israel) Israeli
- Born: April 12, 2007 (age 19) Haifa, Israel

USF Pro 2000 Championship career
- Debut season: 2025
- Current team: TJ Speed Motorsports
- Car number: 27
- Starts: 8
- Wins: 3
- Podiums: 4
- Poles: 3
- Fastest laps: 2

Ariel Elkin (born April 12, 2007) is an Israeli racing driver who last competed in the 2025 USF Pro 2000 Championship driving for TJ Speed Motorsports.

== Career ==
=== Italian Formula 4 ===
Elkin made his single-seater debut in 2023, joining Jenzer Motorsport to compete in Italian F4. In his only season in the series, Elkin took a best result of seventh at Vallelunga and finished 17th in the overall standings at season's end.

=== United States Formula 4 ===
At the end of 2023, Elkin competed in Formula 4 United States for International Motorsport at the season-ending round at Circuit of the Americas, taking a best result of second in race two among the three races.

=== USF Juniors ===
In 2024, Elkin competed in USF Juniors with International Motorsport. He scored his first victory at Barber, before scoring two more wins in the following eleven races to end the season fourth in the standings on 278 points.

=== Spanish Formula 4 ===
At the end of 2024, Elkin competed in the Spanish Formula 4 for team Saintéloc Racing for the round at Circuito de Jerez and also raced for GRS Team at the season-ending round at Circuit de Barcelona-Catalunya. His best finish was 12th in the first race.

== Karting record ==
=== Karting career summary ===
Season	Series	Team	Position
2017	WSK Final Cup - 60 Mini	Formula K Junior Team	7th
2018	WSK Champions Cup - 60 Mini		32nd
2018	WSK Final Cup - 60 Mini		44th
2018	WSK Super Master Series - 60 Mini		20th
2018	Andrea Margutti Trophy - 60 Mini	Formula K Junior Team	6th
2018	ROK Cup International Final - Mini ROK	Formula K Junior Team	5th
2018	Israel Karting Championship - Mini		1st
2019	WSK Super Master Series - OK Junior	Formula K Junior Team	41st
2019	WSK Champions Cup - OK Junior	Formula K Junior Team	6th
2019	48° Trofeo delle Industrie - OK Junior	Formula K Junior Team	18th
2019	WSK Open Cup - OK Junior	Formula K Junior Team	17th
2019	Italian ACI Karting Championship - X30 Junior		9th
2019	Israel Karting Championship - Junior		1st
2020	WSK Champions Cup - OK Junior	VDK Racing	28th
2020	WSK Super Master Series - OK Junior	VDK Racing	28th
2020	FIA Karting Academy Trophy	Israel	9th
2020	Israel Karting Championship - Junior		1st
2021	WSK Champions Cup - OK	VDK Racing	18th
2021	WSK Super Master Series - OK	VDK Racing	28th
2021	WSK Euro Series - OK	VDK Racing	47th
2021	WSK Open Cup - OK	VDK Racing	37th
2021	Champions of the Future - OK	VDK Racing	14th
2021	IAME Euro Series - X30 Senior	VDK Racing	50th
2021	FIA Karting European Championship - OK	VDK Racing	14th
2021	SKUSA SuperNationals XXIV - X30 Senior	TB Kart	32nd
2021	26° Trofeo Ayrton Senna - X30 Senior		4th
2022	27° South Garda Winter Cup - KZ2		6th
2022	FIA Motorsport Games - Karting - Sprint Senior	Israel	3rd
2022	Italian ACI Karting Championship - X30 Senior	TB Kart	11th
2022	IAME Euro Series - X30 Senior	TB Kart Racing	5th
2022	SKUSA SuperNationals XXV - X30 Senior	Racelab	3rd
2022	SKUSA SuperNationals XXV - KA100 Sr.	Racelab	36th
2022	IAME Warriors Final - X30 Senior	TB Kart Racing Team	12th
2022	FIA Karting World Championship - KZ	TB Kart Racing Team	25th
2022	IAME Winter Cup - X30 Senior	VDK Racing	6th
2023	SKUSA SuperNationals XXVI - X30 Senior	Racelab	4th

== Racing record ==
=== Racing career summary ===
Season	Series	Team	Races	Wins	Poles	F/Laps	Podiums	Points	Position
2023	Italian F4 Championship	Jenzer Motorsport	21	0	0	0	0	16.5	17th
2023	Formula 4 United States Championship	International Motorsport	3	0	0	1	1	32	14th
2024	USF Juniors	International Motorsport	16	3	4	2	6	278	4th
2024	F4 Spanish Championship	Saintéloc Racing	3	0	0	0	0	0	NC†
2024	F4 Spanish Championship	GRS Team	3	0	0	0	0	0	NC†
2024	FIA Motorsport Games Formula 4 Cup	Team Israel	2	0	0	0	0	N/A	4th
2025	USF Pro 2000 Championship	TJ Speed Motorsports	17	3	3	2	6	347	**2nd**
2025	Eurocup-3	Tecnicar by Amtog	4	0	0	0	0	0	NC†
2025-26	SMP F4 Winter Series	Formula K Russia	1	1	1	1	1	34	11th

† As Elkin was a guest driver, he was ineligible for points.

^{*} Season still in progress.

=== Complete Italian F4 Championship results ===
(key) (Races in bold indicate pole position) (Races in italics indicate fastest lap)

Year	Team	1	2	3	4	5	6	7	8	9	10	11	12	13	14	15	16	17	18	19	20	21	22	DC	Points
2023	Jenzer Motorsport	IMO; 1; 11	IMO; 2	IMO; 3 Ret	IMO; 4; 13	MIS; 1; 20	MIS; 2; 14	MIS; 3 Ret	SPA; 1; 13	SPA; 2; 10	SPA; 3 Ret	MNZ; 1; 13	MNZ; 2; 9	MNZ; 3 Ret	LEC; 1; 15	LEC; 2; 21	LEC; 3; 8	MUG; 1; 14	MUG; 2; 15	MUG; 3; 12	VLL; 1; 7	VLL; 2; 8	VLL; 3; 15	17th	16.5

=== Complete Formula 4 United States Championship results ===
(key) (Races in bold indicate pole position) (Races in italics indicate fastest lap)

Year	Team	1	2	3	4	5	6	7	8	9	10	11	12	13	14	15	16	17	18	Pos	Points
2023	International Motorsport	NOL; 1	NOL; 2	NOL; 3	ROA; 1	ROA; 2	ROA; 3	MOH; 1	MOH; 2	MOH; 3	NJM; 1	NJM; 2	NJM; 3	VIR; 1	VIR; 2	VIR; 3	COA; 1; 4	COA; 2; 2	COA; 3; 9	14th	32

=== Complete F4 Spanish Championship results ===
(key) (Races in bold indicate pole position) (Races in italics indicate fastest lap)

Year	Team	1	2	3	4	5	6	7	8	9	10	11	12	13	14	15	16	17	18	19	20	21	Pos	Points
2024	Saintéloc Racing	JAR; 1	JAR; 2	JAR; 3	POR; 1	POR; 2	POR; 3	LEC; 1	LEC; 2	LEC; 3	ARA; 1	ARA; 2	ARA; 3	CRT; 1	CRT; 2	CRT; 3	JER; 1; 12	JER; 2; 14	JER; 3; 13				NC†	0
2024	GRS Team																			CAT; 1; 14	CAT; 2; 14	CAT; 3; 21	NC†	0

† As Elkin was a guest driver, he was ineligible for points.

=== Complete Eurocup-3 results ===
(key) (Races in bold indicate pole position) (Races in italics indicate fastest lap)

Year	Team	1	2	3	4	5	6	7	8	9	10	11	12	13	14	15	16	17	18	DC	Points
2025	Tecnicar by Amtog	RBR; 1	RBR; 2	POR; 1	POR; SR	POR; 2	LEC; 1	LEC; SR	LEC; 2	MNZ; 1	MNZ; 2	ASS; 1	ASS; 2	SPA; 1	SPA; 2	JER; 1; 12	JER; 2; 13	CAT; 1; 17	CAT; 2; 12	NC†	0

† As Elkin was a guest driver, he was ineligible for points.

=== American open–wheel racing results ===
==== USF Juniors ====
(key) (Races in bold indicate pole position) (Races in italics indicate fastest lap)

Year	Team	1	2	3	4	5	6	7	8	9	10	11	12	13	14	15	16	Pos	Points
2024	International Motorsport	NOL; 1; 5	NOL; 2; 3	NOL; 3; 4	**ALA**; **1**; 1	**ALA**; **2**; 1	VIR; 1; 8	**VIR**; **2**; 22	**VIR**; **3**; 13	MOH; 1; 7	MOH; 2; 3	ROA; 1; 20	ROA; 2; 1	ROA; 3; 2	POR; 1; 17	POR; 2; 5	POR; 3; 6	4th	278

==== USF Pro 2000 Championship ====
(key) (Races in bold indicate pole position) (Races in italics indicate fastest lap)

Year	Team	1	2	3	4	5	6	7	8	9	10	11	12	13	14	15	16	17	18	Pos	Points
2025	TJ Speed Motorsports	STP; 1; 18	STP; 2 DNS	LOU; 1; 5	LOU; 2; 3	LOU; 3; 5	IMS; 1; 1	IMS; 2; 5	IMS; 3; 1	IRP; 1	ROA; 1; 7	ROA; 2; 4	ROA; 3; 3	MOH; 1; 2	MOH; 2; 5	TOR; 1; 10	TOR; 2; 5	POR; 1; 8	POR; 2; 4	2nd	347
