= Max Taylor (racing driver) =

American racing driver (born 2007)

- Nationality: (United States) American
- Born: October 1, 2007 (age 19) Greenwich, Connecticut, U.S.

Indy NXT career
- Debut season: 2025
- Current team: Andretti Global
- Car number: 28
- Former teams: HMD Motorsports
- Starts: 13
- Wins: 1
- Podiums: 0
- Poles: 0
- Fastest laps: 0
- Best finish: 4th in 2026

USF Pro 2000 Championship career
- Debut season: 2025
- Current team: Velocity Racing Development
- Car number: 88
- Starts: 18
- Wins: 1
- Podiums: 4
- Poles: 0
- Fastest laps: 0
- Best finish: 6th in 2025

Previous series
- 2025 2024 2023–24 2023–24 2023: USF Pro 2000 Championship; GB3 Championship; USF2000 Championship; USF Juniors; F4 US Championship

Championship titles
- 2024: USF Juniors

Max Taylor (born October 1, 2007) is an American racing driver who currently competes in the Indy NXT for Andretti Global. He previously competed in the USF Pro 2000 Championship with Velocity Racing Development. Taylor is the 2024 USF Juniors Champion.

== Racing career ==
=== USF Juniors ===
==== 2023 ====
On November 17, 2022, Taylor announced that he would be making his open-wheel racing debut in the 2023 USF Juniors driving for Velocity Racing Development. He would get his maiden win in the series in the third race at the Road America round. Taylor would finish sixth in the championship.

==== 2024 ====
Taylor would return to the series for the 2024 season once again with Velocity Racing Development. He would be in title contention all season with rival Liam McNeilly.

=== USF2000 Championship ===
==== 2023 ====
Alongside his full season campaign in USF Juniors, Taylor would make select starts in the 2023 USF2000 Championship with Velocity Racing Development. He had a best finish of sixth in race one at Road America.

==== 2024 ====
Taylor would contest the full USF2000 Championship for 2024, remaining with Velocity Racing Development.

=== GB3 Championship ===
==== 2024 ====
Taylor competed in a one-off round in Donington Park during the 2024 GB3 Championship, driving for Arden Motorsport.

==== 2025 ====
Taylor had another one-off round in GB3 for 2025, driving for new entrants Racelab in Donington Park once more.

=== USF Pro 2000 Championship ===
In 2025, Taylor stepped up to the 2025 USF Pro 2000 Championship with Velocity Racing Development.

=== Indy NXT ===
==== 2025 ====
Alongside his USF Pro 2000 campaign, Taylor also raced part-time in Indy NXT for HMD Motorsports.

==== 2026 ====
Taylor made a full promotion to Indy NXT in 2026, driving for Andretti Global. He secured his first Indy NXT victory at the Grand Prix of Arlington in March 2026.

== Racing record ==
=== Racing career summary ===
Season	Series	Team	Races	Wins	Poles	F/Laps	Podiums	Points	Position
2023	USF Juniors	Velocity Racing Development	16	1	0	2	3	236	6th
2023	Formula 4 United States Championship	Velocity Racing Development	3	0	0	0	0	4	25th
2023	USF2000 Championship	Velocity Racing Development	11	0	0	0	0	86	18th
2024	USF Juniors	Velocity Racing Development	15	3	3	3	9	329	**1st**
2024	USF2000 Championship	Velocity Racing Development	18	4	1	2	8	343	**3rd**
2024	GB3 Championship	Arden Motorsport	3	0	0	0	0	22	26th
2025	USF Pro 2000 Championship	Velocity Racing Development	18	1	0	0	4	268	6th
2025	Indy NXT	HMD Motorsports	6	0	0	0	0	123	20th
2025	GB3 Championship	Race Lab	3	0	0	0	0	39	26th
2026	Indy NXT	Andretti Global	17	1	2	3	5	470	4th

* Season still in progress.

=== American open-wheel racing results ===
==== USF Juniors ====
(key) (Races in bold indicate pole position) (Races in italics indicate fastest lap) (Races with * indicate most race laps led)

Year	Team	1	2	3	4	5	6	7	8	9	10	11	12	13	14	15	16	Rank	Points
2023	Velocity Racing Development	SEB; 1; 13	SEB; 2; 13	SEB; 3; 4	ALA; 1; 7	ALA; 2; 5	VIR; 1; 4	VIR; 2; 11	VIR; 3; 3	MOH; 1; 11	MOH; 2; 6	ROA; 1; 13	ROA; 2; 15	ROA; 3; 1	COA; 1; 2*	COA; 2; 14	COA; 3; 6	6th	236
2024	Velocity Racing Development	NOL; 1; 3	NOL; 2; 6	NOL; 3; 2	ALA; 1; 8	ALA; 2; 5	VIR; 1; 1	VIR; 2; 5	VIR; 3; 3	MOH; 1; 1*	MOH; 2; 5	**ROA**; **1**; 1*	ROA; 2; 6	**ROA**; **3**; 3	**POR**; **1**; 3	POR; 2; 2	POR; 3 DNS	1st	329

==== Formula 4 United States Championship ====
(key) (Races in bold indicate pole position) (Races in italics indicate fastest lap)

Year	Team	1	2	3	4	5	6	7	8	9	10	11	12	13	14	15	16	17	18	Pos	Points
2023	Velocity Racing Development	NOL; 1	NOL; 2	NOL; 3	ROA; 1; 12	ROA; 2; 6	ROA; 3; 15	MOH; 1	MOH; 2	MOH; 3	NJM; 1	NJM; 2	NJM; 3	VIR; 1	VIR; 2	VIR; 3	COA; 1	COA; 2	COA; 3	25th	4

==== USF2000 Championship ====
(key) (Races in bold indicate pole position) (Races in italics indicate fastest lap) (Races with * indicate most race laps led)

Year	Team	1	2	3	4	5	6	7	8	9	10	11	12	13	14	15	16	17	18	Rank	Points
2023	Velocity Racing Development	STP; 1	STP; 2	SEB; 1	SEB; 1	IMS; 1; 17	IMS; 2; 16	IMS; 3; 8	IRP	ROA; 1; 6	ROA; 2; 21	MOH; 1; 11	MOH; 2; 21	MOH; 3; 19	TOR; 1	TOR; 2	POR; 1; 11	POR; 2; 9	POR; 3; 8	18th	86
2024	Velocity Racing Development	STP; 1; 18	STP; 2; 15	NOL; 1; 5	NOL; 2; 6	NOL; 3; 3	IMS; 1; 1*	IMS; 2; 2	IRP; 17	ROA; 1; 3	**ROA**; **2**; 1	MOH; 1; 1*	MOH; 2; 5	MOH; 3; 1*	TOR; 1; 2	TOR; 2; 5	POR; 1; 17	POR; 2; 4	POR; 3; 6	3rd	343

==== USF Pro 2000 Championship ====
(key) (Races in bold indicate pole position) (Races in italics indicate fastest lap)

Year	Team	1	2	3	4	5	6	7	8	9	10	11	12	13	14	15	16	17	18	Position	Points
2025	Velocity Racing Development	STP; 1; 5	STP; 2; 4	NOL; 1; 7	NOL; 2; 5	NOL; 3; 3	IMS; 1; 3	IMS; 2; 10	IMS; 3; 19	IRP; 8	ROA; 1; 8	ROA; 2; 5	ROA; 3; 1*	MOH; 1; 3	MOH; 2; 8	TOR; 1 DSQ	TOR; 2; 19	POR; 1; 4	POR; 2; 11	6th	268

* Season still in progress.

==== Indy NXT ====
(key) (Races in bold indicate pole position) (Races in italics indicate fastest lap) (Races with ^{L} indicate a race lap led) (Races with * indicate most race laps led)

Year	Team	1	2	3	4	5	6	7	8	9	10	11	12	13	14	15	16	17	Rank	Points
2025	HMD Motorsports	STP	BAR; 7	IMS	IMS	DET; 19	GMP	RDA	MOH	IOW; 10	LAG; 16	LAG; 4	POR	MIL; 10	NSH				20th	123
2026	Andretti Global	STP; 2	ARL; 1	BAR; 19	BAR; 2	IMS; 5	**IMS**; 2	DET; 20	GAT; 5	ROA; 12	ROA; 17	MOH; 10	MOH; 9	NSS; 5	POR; 3	MIL; 4	LAG; 7	LAG; 14	4th	470

* Season still in progress.

=== Complete GB3 Championship results ===
(key) (Races in bold indicate pole position) (Races in italics indicate fastest lap)

Year	Team	1	2	3	4	5	6	7	8	9	10	11	12	13	14	15	16	17	18	19	20	21	22	23	24	DC	Points
2024	Arden Motorsport	OUL; 1	OUL; 2	OUL; 3	SIL1; 1	SIL1; 2	SIL1; 3	SPA; 1	SPA; 2	SPA; 3	HUN; 1	HUN; 2	HUN; 3	ZAN; 1	ZAN; 2	ZAN; 3	SIL2; 1	SIL2; 2	SIL2; 3	DON; 1; 11	DON; 2; 11	DON; 3; 14	BRH; 1	BRH; 2	BRH; 3	26th	22
2025	Racelab	SIL1; 1	SIL1; 2	SIL1; 3	ZAN; 1	ZAN; 2	ZAN; 3	SPA; 1	SPA; 2	SPA; 3	HUN; 1	HUN; 2	HUN; 3	SIL2; 1	SIL2; 2	SIL2; 3	BRH; 1	BRH; 2	BRH; 3	DON; 1; 10	DON; 2; 9	DON; 3; 8^{8}	MNZ; 1	MNZ; 2	MNZ; 3	26th	39
