= Carson Etter =

American racing driver (born 2004)

- Nationality: (United States) American
- Born: March 2, 2004 (age 22) Villa Park, California, U.S.

Indy NXT career
- Debut season: 2026
- Current team: Chip Ganassi Racing
- Car number: 11
- Starts: 17
- Wins: 0
- Podiums: 0
- Poles: 0
- Fastest laps: 0
- Best finish: 22nd in 2026

Previous series
- 2025 2024–2023: USF Pro 2000 Championship, USF2000 Championship, F4 Formula Pro USA Western Championship

Carson Etter (born March 2, 2004) is an American racing driver who currently competes in the Indy NXT with Chip Ganassi Racing.

Etter has previously raced in the USF Pro 2000 Championship and the USF2000 Championship.

== Racing career ==
Etter first began racing in off-road Pro Lite competition and dirt trophy karts. He then won the Challenge Cup title in the Junior 2 Kart class in 2017, and placed third in the Lucas Oil Off-Road Regional Challenge in 2020.

In 2022, Etter first competed in open-wheel racing, where he Formula Pro USA Western Championship in the F4 category. That year, he won five races and 12 podiums.

=== USF2000 Championship ===
In 2023, Etter joined the USF2000 Championship for select races in the 2023 season, where he drove for DC Autosport. He finished 23rd in the points, and earned a best finish of 11th at Portland International Raceway.

For the following year, Etter would remain with DC Autosport for the following season, this time for the full schedule. He finished 16th in the points standings after getting a best finish of tenth at NOLA Motorsports Park, the Indianapolis Motor Speedway road course, and Portland.

=== USF Pro 2000 Championship ===
In 2025, Etter moved to the USF Pro 2000 Championship, where he drove for Exclusive Autosport. He finished 17th in the final points standings and earned a best finish of sixth at Portland International Raceway.

=== Indy NXT ===
On December 17, 2025, it was announced that Etter would move up to Indy NXT for the 2026 season, driving for Chip Ganassi Racing. Etter finished 22nd in his rookie season, battling a shoulder injury for much of the year. On November 11, 2026, the team confirmed Etter would return for 2027.

== Personal life ==
Etter is currently a student at Arizona State University.

== Racing record ==
=== Racing career summary ===
Season	Series	Team	Races	Wins	Poles	F/Laps	Podiums	Points	Position
2023	USF Juniors	DC Autosport	16	0	0	0	0	155	12th
2023	USF2000 Championship	DC Autosport	6	0	0	0	0	38	23rd
2024	USF2000 Championship	DC Autosport	18	0	0	0	0	121	16th
2025	USF Pro 2000 Championship	Exclusive Autosport	18	0	0	0	0	117	17th
2026	Indy NXT	Chip Ganassi Racing	17	0	0	0	0	182	22nd
2027	Indy NXT	Chip Ganassi Racing	0	0	0	0	0	0	TBD

=== American open-wheel racing results ===
==== USF2000 Championship ====
(key) (Races in bold indicate pole position) (Races in italics indicate fastest lap) (Races with * indicate most race laps led)

Year	Team	1	2	3	4	5	6	7	8	9	10	11	12	13	14	15	16	17	18	Rank	Points
2023	DC Autosport	STP; 1	STP; 2	SEB; 1	SEB; 1	IMS; 1	IMS; 2	IMS; 3	IRP	ROA; 1	ROA; 2	MOH; 1; 19	MOH; 2; 13	MOH; 3; 14	TOR; 1	TOR; 2	POR; 1; 15	POR; 2; 11	POR; 3; 16	23rd	38
2024	DC Autosport	STP; 1; 19	STP; 2; 12	NOL; 1; 10	NOL; 2; 20	NOL; 3; 19	IMS; 1; 12	IMS; 2; 10	IRP; 15	ROA; 1; 13	ROA; 2; 21	MOH; 1; 14	MOH; 2; 15	MOH; 3; 13	TOR; 1; 19	TOR; 2; 13	POR; 1; 16	POR; 2; 13	POR; 3; 10	16th	121

==== USF Pro 2000 Championship ====
(key) (Races in bold indicate pole position) (Races in italics indicate fastest lap)

Year	Team	1	2	3	4	5	6	7	8	9	10	11	12	13	14	15	16	17	18	Position	Points
2025	Exclusive Autosport	STP; 1; 15	STP; 2; 12	LOU; 1; 17	LOU; 2; 18	LOU; 3; 19	IMS; 1; 17	IMS; 2; 18	IMS; 3; 12	IRP; 13	ROA; 1; 15	ROA; 2; 14	ROA; 3; 15	MOH; 1; 13	MOH; 2; 12	TOR; 1; 18	TOR; 2; 17	POR; 1; 14	POR; 2; 6	17th	117

==== Indy NXT ====
(key) (Races in bold indicate pole position) (Races in italics indicate fastest lap) (Races with ^{L} indicate a race lap led) (Races with * indicate most race laps led)

Year	Team	1	2	3	4	5	6	7	8	9	10	11	12	13	14	15	16	17	Rank	Points
2026	Chip Ganassi Racing	STP; 24	ARL; 19	BAR; 21	BAR; 21	IMS; 17	IMS; 19	DET; 19	GAT; 16	ROA; 16	ROA; 13	MOH; 21	MOH; 23	NSS; 20	POR; 24	MIL; 16	LAG; 20	LAG; 19	22nd	182

* Season still in progress.
