= Jack Jeffers =

American racing driver (born 2006)

- Nationality: United States
- Born: 17 July 2006 (age 20); San Antonio, Texas, United States

USF2000 Championship career
- Debut season: 2024
- Current team: Exclusive Autosport
- Car number: 92
- Starts: 4
- Wins: 1
- Podiums: 2
- Poles: 0
- Fastest laps: 1
- Best finish: 26th in 2024

Previous series
- 2023-2024 2022 2024: USF Juniors; Lucas Oil Formula Car Race Series; YACademy Winter Series

Championship titles
- 2022 2024 2025: Lucas Oil Formula Car Race Series; YACademy Winter Series; USF2000 Championship

Jack Jeffers (born 17 July 2006) is an American racing driver from San Antonio, Texas. He currently competes in USF Juniors and the USF2000 Championship with Exclusive Autosport.

== Career ==
=== Karting ===
Jeffers began national karting at the age of nine, where he entered the Florida Winter Tour in the Micro ROK category. He finished tenth in the standings. In 2018, Jeffers increased his commitments on the karting front, entering four national championships with a best result of fifth in the SKUSA Pro Tour, as he moved up to the Mini category. At the end of the year he competed in his first SKUSA SuperNationals. In 2019, he secured his first championship podium, finishing third in the Florida Winter Tour in the Mini ROK category. From 2020 onwards, he competed in select championships in preparation for a move up to cars.

=== Lower formulae ===
Jeffers made his debut in car racing by joining the Lucas Oil Car Race Series in 2022. He had a brilliant rookie season, finishing on the podium ten times in eighteen races, as he eventually took the title with six wins and 504 points to his name.

=== USF Juniors ===
==== 2023 ====
After his title-winning campaign in the previous season, Exclusive Autosport announced that they would be signing Jeffers for the 2023 USF Juniors season. He had a strong season with the team, and he managed to finish third in the standings after taking three race wins and nine podiums in sixteen races over the course of the season.

==== 2024 ====
Despite finishing on the championship podium in his rookie season, Jeffers opted to remain in USF Juniors for a second season in 2024. He began the year in the YACademy Winter Series, where he asserted himself as a title contender for the main season by winning the title after taking four wins from six races. However, Jeffers endured a tough season in his main campaign in USF Juniors, with a poor start to the season seeing him finish on the podium just once in the opening two rounds. Although Jeffers had a much stronger end to the season, securing five more podiums from the last eleven races, the combination of inconsistency and the failure to clinch a victory over the course of the season saw him finish fifth in the standings.

=== USF2000 Championship ===
In 2024, it was announced that Jeffers would be taking part in a part-time USF2000 Championship campaign with Exclusive Autosport. He made his debut in St. Petersburg, finishing eighth in his first race.

For 2025, Jeffers would move to the series full-time for the 2025 season with Exclusive Autosport. After three second-places in a row in the opening three races, he took his first win of the season in Indianapolis, having started from third. With Liam McNeilly absent, a third place in race two was enough for Jeffers to take the championship lead by two points.

== Karting record ==
=== Karting career summary ===
Season	Series	Team	Position
2016	Florida Winter Tour - Micro ROK		10th
2017	Rotax Max Challenge Grand Finals - Micro Max	SRA Karting Int	23rd
2018	SKUSA Pro Tour - Mini Swift		5th
2018	Florida Winter Tour - Mini ROK		9th
2018	SKUSA Winter Series - Mini Swift		19th
2018	SKUSA SuperNationals XXII - Mini Swift	Orsolon Racing	12th
2019	SKUSA Pro Tour - Mini Swift		10th
2019	SKUSA SuperNationals XXIII - X30 Junior		
2019	Biloxi ROK Fest - Junior ROK	Orsolon Racing	21st
2019	Florida Winter Tour - Mini ROK	Orsolon Racing	3rd
2019	ROK the Rio - Junior ROK	Speed Concepts	19th
2020	Florida Winter Tour - Junior ROK	Speed Concepts	9th
2020	SKUSA Winter Series - X30 Junior		
2021	SKUSA SuperNationals XXIV - X30 Senior	Speed Concepts Racing	37th
2022	SKUSA SuperNationals XXV - X30 Senior	Speed Concepts Racing	13th

== Racing record ==
=== Racing career summary ===
Season	Series	Team	Races	Wins	Poles	F/Laps	Podiums	Points	Position
2022	Lucas Oil Formula Car Race Series		18	6	?	?	10	504	**1st**
2023	USF Juniors	Exclusive Autosport	16	3	3	2	9	313	**3rd**
2024	YACademy Winter Series	Exclusive Autosport	6	4	1	2	5	42	**1st**
2024	USF Juniors	Exclusive Autosport	16	0	0	1	6	250	5th
2024	USF2000 Championship	Exclusive Autosport	2	0	0	0	0	16	26th
2025	USF2000 Championship	Exclusive Autosport	18	6	5	5	13	438	**1st**
2026	USF Pro 2000 Championship	Exclusive Autosport	18	6	9	6	10	430	**1st**

* Season still in progress.

=== American open-wheel racing results ===
==== USF Juniors ====
(key) (Races in bold indicate pole position) (Races in italics indicate fastest lap) (Races with * indicate most race laps led)

Year	Team	1	2	3	4	5	6	7	8	9	10	11	12	13	14	15	16	Rank	Points
2023	Exclusive Autosport	SEB; 1; 3	SEB; 2; 3	SEB; 3; 5	ALA; 1; 15	ALA; 2; 8	VIR; 1; 2*	**VIR**; **2**; 12	VIR; 3; 1	MOH; 1; 3	MOH; 2; 4	ROA; 1; 2	ROA; 2; 1*	ROA; 3; 3	**COA**; **1**; 1	**COA**; **2**; 16*	**COA**; **3**; 14*	3rd	313
2024	Exclusive Autosport	NOL; 1; 6	NOL; 2; 5	NOL; 3; 7	ALA; 1; 2	ALA; 2; 19	VIR; 1; 3	VIR; 2; 21	VIR; 3; 2	MOH; 1; 2	MOH; 2; 11	ROA; 1; 3	ROA; 2; 3	ROA; 3; 12	POR; 1; 15	POR; 2; 6	POR; 3; 4	5th	250

==== USF2000 Championship ====
(key) (Races in bold indicate pole position) (Races in italics indicate fastest lap) (Races with * indicate most race laps led)

Year	Team	1	2	3	4	5	6	7	8	9	10	11	12	13	14	15	16	17	18	Rank	Points
2024	Exclusive Autosport	STP; 1; 8	STP; 2; 18	NOL; 1	NOL; 2	NOL; 3	IMS; 1	IMS; 2	IRP	ROA; 1	ROA; 2	MOH; 1	MOH; 2	MOH; 3	TOR; 1	TOR; 2	POR; 1	POR; 2	POR; 3	26th	16
2025	Exclusive Autosport	STP; 1; 2	STP; 2; 2	NOL; 1; 2	NOL; 2; 5	NOL; 3; 4	IMS; 1; 1*	IMS; 2; 3	IRP; 9	**ROA**; **1**; 22	**ROA**; **2**; 7	MOH; 1; 2	MOH; 2; 1*	MOH; 3; 1*	TOR; 1; 1*	**TOR**; **2**; 1*	POR; 1; 2	**POR**; **2**; 1*	**POR**; **3**; 2*	1st	438

==== USF Pro 2000 Championship ====
(key) (Races in bold indicate pole position) (Races in italics indicate fastest lap) (Races with * indicate most race laps led)

Year	Team	1	2	3	4	5	6	7	8	9	10	11	12	13	14	15	16	17	18	Rank	Points
2026	Exclusive Autosport	**ARL**; **1**; 18*	**ARL**; **2**; 1*	IMS; 1; 5	**IMS**; **2**; 1*	IRP; 6	ROA; 1; 4	ROA; 2; 2	MOH; 1; 2	MOH; 2; 4	**MOH**; **3**; 2	POR; 1; 14	POR; 2; 4	**MAR**; **1**; 1*	**MAR**; **2**; 2	MIL; 6	ROA; 1; 1*	ROA; 2; 1*	ROA; 3; 1*	1st	430
