= Jay Howard Driver Development =

American racing team

(United States) Jay Howard Driver Development
- Founded: 2012
- Founder(s): Jay Howard
- Base: Westfield, Indiana, United States
- Team principal(s): Jay Howard
- Current series: USF Pro 2000 Championship; USF2000 Championship; USF Juniors
- Former series: F4 United States Championship
- Current drivers: USF Pro 2000 Championship: (United States) 6. Frankie Mossman; USF2000 Championship: (United States) 6. Evagoras Papasavvas (United States) 7. Jace Bacon (United States) 7. G3 Argyros (United States) 8. Michael Costello (United States) 9. Tanner DeFabis (United States) 63. G3 Argyros; USF Juniors (United States) 3. G3 Argyros (United States) 4. Hudson Potter (United States) 5. Ava Dobson (United States) 6. Aidan Potter (United States) 6. Michael Boyiadzis (Canada) 7. Ayden Ingratta (France) 8. Timothy Carel (United Kingdom) 9. Liam McNeilly
- Website: https://www.jayhoward.com/

Jay Howard Driver Development (JHDD) is an American motorsport team that currently competes in the USF Pro 2000 Championship, the USF2000 Championship, and in USF Juniors. The team was founded in 2012 by former IndyCar Series driver Jay Howard.

== History ==
Jay Howard Driver Development was founded in 2012 by Jay Howard. The team competes in the USF Pro Championships ladder system in all three series; USF Pro 2000 Championship, USF2000 Championship, and USF Juniors, as well as karting.

== Current series results ==
=== Pro Mazda Championship / Indy Pro 2000 Championship / USF Pro 2000 Championship ===
Year	Car	Drivers	Races	Wins	Poles	F/Laps	Podiums	D.C.	Pts	T.C.	Pts
2021	Tatuus PM-18	(Denmark) Christian Rasmussen	18	7	2	8	12	1st	445	3rd	312
2021	Tatuus PM-18	(United States) Wyatt Brichacek	18	0	0	0	0	10th	212	3rd	312
2022	Tatuus IP-22	(United States) Braden Eves	18	1	0	0	5	5th	304	2nd	324
2022	Tatuus IP-22	(United States) Wyatt Brichacek	8	0	0	2	0	13th	160	2nd	324
2022	Tatuus IP-22	(Australia) Marcos Flack	4	0	0	0	0	17th	51	2nd	324
2022	Tatuus IP-22	(Mexico) Salvador de Alba	17	2	1	2	4	8th	289	2nd	324
2023	Tatuus IP-22	(Mexico) Ricardo Escotto	18	1	0	1	1	13th	153	7th	125
2023	Tatuus IP-22	(United States) Reece Ushijima	11	0	0	0	1	14th	140	7th	125
2023	Tatuus IP-22	(United States) Frankie Mossman	5	0	0	0	0	25th	37	7th	125
2024	Tatuus IP-22	(United States) Frankie Mossman	18	0	0	1	2	8th	222	6th	153
2025	Tatuus IP-22	(United States) Frankie Mossman†	17	0	1	0	2	8th	203	6th	85
2025	Tatuus IP-22	(United States) Tanner DeFabis	6	0	0	0	0	20th	70	6th	85
2025	Tatuus IP-22	(United Kingdom) Liam McNeilly	2	0	0	0	0	22nd	36	6th	85
2025	Tatuus IP-22	(Canada) Nick Gilkes	4	0	0	0	0	24th	22	6th	85
2026	Tatuus IP-22	(United States) Tanner DeFabis									
2026	Tatuus IP-22	(Peru) Andrés Cárdenas									
2026	Tatuus IP-22	(United States) JT Hoskins									
2026	Tatuus IP-22	(Chile) Clemente Huerta									

† Mossman drove for Velocity Racing Development from round 6 onwards.

* Season still in progress.

== Timeline ==
Current series
USF2000 Championship	2019–present
USF Pro 2000 Championship	2021–present
USF Juniors	2023–present
Former series
Formula 4 United States Championship	2017–2023
Formula Regional Americas Championship	2020–2021
