= USF Juniors =

American racing series

- Category: Single seaters
- Country: United States
- Inaugural season: 2022
- Drivers: 17
- Teams: 7
- Constructors: Tatuus
- Engine suppliers: Mazda
- Tyre suppliers: Continental
- Drivers' champion: (Brazil) Leonardo Escorpioni
- Teams' champion: (United States) Zanella Racing
- Official website: usfjuniors.com

The USF Juniors championship, also known as USF Juniors presented by Continental Tire for sponsorship reasons, is an American auto racing series running with USF2000 cars (as of 2023). The series was inaugurated in 2022 as a new first rung of the Road to Indy, below the USF2000 Championship. The series is owned by Andersen Promotions and sanctioned by the United States Auto Club (USAC).

== History ==
The USF Juniors championship was formally announced in September 2021. Series founder Dan Andersen cited the need for an additional step up above karting due to the increasingly competitive nature of the USF2000 Championship. He further established the want to provide "a true entry level series that is professionally managed where drivers, teams and parents can focus on training and racing via shorter, more economical events, while also lowering the spotlight on young drivers that often occurs on IndyCar race weekends." The series was also made as a direct competitor to the Formula 4 United States Championship. To allow champions of the series to progress in their careers, winners will receive a scholarship valued at $200,000.

Logo used in 2022.

Series logo used in 2023.

For the series' inaugural season, a six-event scheduled was planned featuring all road courses. USAC, which already handled duties for the USF2000 Championship and USF Pro 2000 Championship, was named the sanctioning body for the series. Former driver Gustavo Yacamán was hired as the series manager, while another two former drivers, Joel Miller and Johnny Unser, were hired as race stewards.

== Cars ==
For the series' inaugural season, competitors used a Ligier JS F4 chassis with a 160 hp 2.0 Liter engine made by Honda Performance Development (HPD). As with all other series in the Road to Indy ladder, The Goodyear Tire and Rubber Company, through their Cooper brand, was the tire supplier for the series for the first two years. For the 2023 season, USF Juniors began using the Tatuus JR-23 chassis, which can be upgraded for use in both USF2000 and USF Pro 2000 as drivers and teams progress through the Road to Indy ladder. The new car also uses the same MZR engine used in the Road to Indy series. From 2024, Continental provides the tires along with the title partnership of the series.

== Circuits ==
Red indicates current tracks. White indicates former tracks. Purple indicates future tracks.

Course	Years
Barber Motorsports Park	2022–2025
Canadian Tire Motorsports Park	2026
Carolina Motorsports Park	2026
Circuit of the Americas	2022–2023
Homestead-Miami Speedway	2026
Laguna Seca	2027
Lime Rock Park	2026
Mid-Ohio Sports Car Course	2022–present
NOLA Motorsports Park	2024–2025
Ozarks International Raceway	2022
Portland International Raceway	2024–2025, 2027
Road America	2022–present
Sebring International Raceway	2023
Virginia International Raceway	2022–2024

== Champions ==
Season	Drivers Champion	Teams Champion
2022	(Canada) Mac Clark	(United States) Velocity Racing Development
2023	(Brazil) Nicolas Giaffone	(United States) DEForce Racing
2024	(United States) Max Taylor	(United States) Velocity Racing Development
2025	(Brazil) Leonardo Escorpioni	(United States) Zanella Racing
