= 2026 USF2000 Championship =

Racing season

The 2026 USF2000 Championship presented by Continental Tire was the seventeenth season of the USF2000 Championship since its revival in 2010. The championship serves as the second rung of the IndyCar Series's USF Pro Championships ladder system. The season was held over 18 races across eight race weekends. It started on February 27 around the Streets of St. Petersburg and ended on September 26 at Road America.

Colombian driver Sebastián Garzón, driving for DEForce Racing, won the Drivers' Championship in the final race of the season at Road America. Pabst Racing, the team which fielded Garzón's two closest competitors, won the Teams' Championship for the seventh time in its history.

== Drivers and teams ==
All drivers competed using Tatuus USF-22 racecars with Elite Mazda 2.0-014A engines and Continental tires.

Team	No.	Driver(s)	Status	Round(s)
DEForce Racing	10	(United States) Brady Golan		1–2
DEForce Racing	10	(Mexico) Elias Vignola	R	3–5, 7–9, 14–15
DEForce Racing	12	(Colombia) Sebastián Garzón		All
DEForce Racing	17	(United States) Thomas Nordquist	R	All
ENVE Motorsports	46	(United States) Wesley Gundler	R	All
Exclusive Autosport	87	(Canada) Leonardo Serravalle	R	7–9
Exclusive Autosport	90	(United States) Evan Cooley		All
Exclusive Autosport	91	(United States) Kaylee Countryman	R	1–2
Exclusive Autosport	91	(United States) Connor Aspley	R	7–13, 16–18
Exclusive Autosport	92	(Canada) Anthony Martella		1–15
Exclusive Autosport	92	(United States) Brenden Cooley	R	16–18
Exclusive Autosport	93	(United States) Gabriel Cahan	R	All
Exclusive Autosport	94	(United States) Ayrton Cahan	R	All
Exclusive Autosport	95	(United States) Brenden Cooley	R	6, 14–15
Exclusive Autosport	97	(United States) Connor Aspley	R	1–2
Exclusive Autosport	97	(Canada) Cole Medeiros	R	7–9, 14–15
JHDD powered by ECR	5	(United States) Kaylee Countryman	R	3–5, 7–9, 12–15
JHDD powered by ECR	6	(Australia) Liam Loiacono	R	1–13
JHDD powered by ECR	7	(Brazil) Naim Saleh	R	1–2, 7–18
JHDD powered by ECR	8	(Sweden) Erik Holm	R	1–6
JHDD powered by ECR	8	(United Kingdom) Max Cuthbert	R	12–15
JHDD powered by ECR	9	(United States) Cal Peter	R	All
Olivia Racing	25	(Poland) Karol Pasiewicz	R	12–13
Pabst Racing	22	(Australia) Brad Majman		All
Pabst Racing	23	(Australia) Eddie Beswick		All
Pabst Racing	24	(Canada) Lucas Nanji	R	All
Peterman Fisher Hartman Racing	67	(South Africa) Wian Boshoff		All
VRD Racing	3	(Brazil) João Vergara	R	All
VRD Racing	19	(United States) Colin Aitken	R	1–2
VRD Racing	21	(United States) Dean Pedersen	R	14–15
VRD Racing	25	(United States) Teddy Musella		1–2
VRD Racing	44	(United States) Ryan Giannetta		All
VRD Racing	78	(United States) Jack Mohrhardt	R	All
VRD Racing	98	(United States) Oliver Wheldon	R	3–18
Zanella Racing	28	(United States) Grant Mitchell	R	7–9
Zanella Racing	29	(United States) Maddie Colleran	R	7–9
Zanella Racing	55	(Brazil) Leonardo Escorpioni	R	1–2

Icon	Status
R	Rookie

=== Team changes ===
After having already entered the season finale in 2025 in preparation for their 2026 campaign, ENVE Motorsports entered the championship as a new team.

USF Juniors team Zanella Racing expanded to add an USF2000 program in 2026.

IndyCar team Ed Carpenter Racing announced a partnership with Jay Howard Driver Development, with JHDD's cars in the USF Pro Championships entering under the Jay Howard Driver Development powered by ECR guise.

One-car teams Benchmark Autosport and Synergy Motorsport both left the series.

==== Mid-season ====
Zanella Racing only entered the opening event before their sole driver Leonardo Escorpioni decided to focus on his USF Pro 2000 campaign. The team then entered two more drivers on one-off appearances for the first round at Road America.

Sarah Fisher Hartman Racing Development underwent a change in ownership ahead of the second weekend of the season: entrepreneurs Chad and Emily Peterman joined the team as new owners and the outfit was rebranded to Peterman Fisher Hartman Racing from round three onwards.

The one-car Olivia Racing outfit joined the series for the Grand Prix of Portland.

=== Driver changes ===
Reigning Teams' Champions VRD Racing saw Thomas Schrage and Christian Cameron leave the championship, while Teddy Musella remained with the team for the opening weekend of 2026 ahead of stepping up to their USF Pro 2000 outfit. To replace them, VRD promoted both João Vergara and Colin Aitken from their USF Juniors outfit, with whom the former came third and the latter 21st in 2025, and signed Formula FARA graduate Jack Mohrhardt.

Exclusive Autosport saw Lucas Fecury, Brenden Cooley and reigning champion Jack Jeffers leave the series. They were replaced by two debutants and a returnee: Brothers Ayrton and Gabriel Cahan, reigning champion and runner-up of the FRP F1600 Championship, joined the team for their USF2000 debuts, while Anthony Martella departed JHDD to return to the team he drove for in USF Juniors in 2024. Kaylee Countryman rejoined Exclusive Racing after a four-race cameo and a USF Juniors campaign with the team in 2025 for a partial schedule. Exclusive Autosport also entered a sixth car at St. Petersburg for their USF Juniors driver Connor Aspley.

Pabst Racing expanded to an all-new three-car lineup in 2026 after they promoted G3 Argyros to their USF Pro 2000 outfit and Caleb Gafrarar left the series. The team signed Brad Majman and Eddie Beswick for their second seasons after they came twelfth with JHDD and tenth with Synergy Motorsport, respectively, in 2025. Pabst's lineup was completed by karting graduate Lucas Nanji.

The newly formed JHDD/ECR partnership recruited Skip Barber Formula Race Series driver Naim Saleh to replace Pabst-bound Majman and signed karting graduate Cal Peter to replace Exclusive-bound Martella. They also promoted 2025 USF Juniors runner-up Liam Loiacono from its outfit in that championship, as well as entering karting graduate Erik Holm in place of Timothy Carel, who left the championship.

DEForce Racing downsized from five to three entries as both Patricio and Rodrigo González moved over to GB3 with VRD and Jeshua Alianell and Vaughn Mishko left the series. The team promoted Thomas Nordquist from their USF Juniors outfit, where he finished the 2025 season in 17th, to their USF2000 outfit, with whom he had already debuted in the championship for two races in 2025, while Brady Golan rejoined the team with whom he competed in the first five rounds of 2025 for the opening two races of 2026.

ENVE Motorsport signed F1600 Championship Series graduate Wesley Gundler for their first full USF2000 season.

New team Zanella Racing promoted reigning USF Juniors champion Leonardo Escorpioni to their newly founded USF2000 program.

Departing team Synergy Motorsport saw their driver Eddie Beswick join Pabst Racing, while Ayrton Houk departed the series together with his Benchmark Autosport team.

==== Mid-season ====
The weekend at Indianapolis Motor Speedway saw DEForce Racing enter series debutant Elias Vignola in their third car, while Kaylee Countryman moved from Exclusive Autosport to JHDD/ECR to continue her part-time campaign. Naim Saleh meanwhile skipped the weekend, with Aitken and Escorpioni also both not competing to focus on their USF Pro 2000 campaigns. VRD welcomed Oliver Wheldon for a belated start to his campaign after his 15th birthday in March.

Brenden Cooley returned to Exclusive Autosport for the Carb Night Classic.

Vignola returned to DEForce Racing for the round at Road America, while Saleh returned to JHDD/ECR and Aspley to Exclusive Racing. The latter team's lineup grew to seven cars as they took on series debutants Leonardo Serravalle and Cole Medeiros for one-off outings. Zanella Racing returned to the series after sitting out the previous two weekends, fielding their USF Juniors drivers Grant Mitchell and Maddie Colleran at Road America. Erik Holm meanwhile left the series.

The Grand Prix of Portland saw USF Juniors drivers Karol Pasiewicz and Max Cuthbert make their series debuts: Pasiewicz entered the round with his one-car Olivia Racing outfit and Cuthbert joined JHDD/ECR for Portland and Markham in the car previously piloted by Holm.

Brenden Cooley, Cole Medeiros and Elias Vignola made another one-off appearance for the Grand Prix of Markham, while Liam Loiacono, who had already withdrawn from the round at Portland, was forced to end his season early due to budget issues, Connor Aspley left Exclusive Autosport and F4 CEZ driver Dean Pedersen made his series debut in a one-off appeareance with VRD Racing.

Connor Aspley rejoined Exclusive Autosport for the season finale as Anthony Martella cut his season short to graduate to USF Pro 2000, with Brenden Cooley taking over his No. 92 entry.

== Schedule ==
The 2026 schedule was revealed on October 25, 2025. The championship visited two street circuits, four road courses and one oval. It followed its parent series in moving its Canadian rounds from Exhibition Place to the Streets of Markham, while it replaced the round at NOLA Motorsports Park it held in 2024 and 2025 with a second round at Road America. All rounds except the second weekend at Road America were run in support of the IndyCar Series. The Lucas Oil Indianapolis Raceway Park round was officially also independent from the IndyCar Series, but run in support of the Dave Steele Classic and Hoosier Hundred events on the weekend of the Indianapolis 500.

Icon	Legend
O	Oval/Speedway
R	Road course
S	Street circuit

Rd.	Date	Race name	Track	Location
1	February 27–March 1	Foundation Building Materials Grand Prix of St. Petersburg	S Streets of St. Petersburg	St. Petersburg, Florida
2	February 27–March 1	Andersen Interior Contracting Grand Prix of St. Petersburg	S Streets of St. Petersburg	St. Petersburg, Florida
3	May 7–9	Tatuus USF Pro Championships Indy Grand Prix	R Indianapolis Motor Speedway Road Course	Speedway, Indiana
4	May 7–9	Tatuus USF Pro Championships Indy Grand Prix	R Indianapolis Motor Speedway Road Course	Speedway, Indiana
5	May 7–9	Tatuus USF Pro Championships Indy Grand Prix	R Indianapolis Motor Speedway Road Course	Speedway, Indiana
6	May 20–21	Carb Night Classic presented by Marelli	O Lucas Oil Indianapolis Raceway Park	Brownsburg, Indiana
7	June 18–21	The Andersen Companies Grand Prix of Road America presented by Elite Engines	R Road America	Elkhart Lake, Wisconsin
8	June 18–21	The Andersen Companies Grand Prix of Road America presented by Elite Engines	R Road America	Elkhart Lake, Wisconsin
9	June 18–21	The Andersen Companies Grand Prix of Road America presented by Elite Engines	R Road America	Elkhart Lake, Wisconsin
10	July 2–5	USF Pro Patriot 250 Grand Prix of Mid-Ohio	R Mid-Ohio Sports Car Course	Lexington, Ohio
11	July 2–5	USF Pro Patriot 250 Grand Prix of Mid-Ohio	R Mid-Ohio Sports Car Course	Lexington, Ohio
12	August 6–9	Continental Tire Grand Prix of Portland	R Portland International Raceway	Portland, Oregon
13	August 6–9	Continental Tire Grand Prix of Portland	R Portland International Raceway	Portland, Oregon
14	August 14–16	Continental Tire Grand Prix of Markham	S Streets of Markham	Markham, Ontario
15	August 14–16	Continental Tire Grand Prix of Markham	S Streets of Markham	Markham, Ontario
16	September 24–26	USF Pro Championships Grand Prix of Road America	R Road America	Elkhart Lake, Wisconsin
17	September 24–26	USF Pro Championships Grand Prix of Road America	R Road America	Elkhart Lake, Wisconsin
18	September 24–26	USF Pro Championships Grand Prix of Road America	R Road America	Elkhart Lake, Wisconsin

== Race results ==
Rd.	Track	Pole position	Fastest lap	Most laps led	Race winner	
Rd.	Track	Pole position	Fastest lap	Most laps led	Driver	Team
1	Streets of St. Petersburg	(Colombia) Sebastián Garzón	(Australia) Brad Majman	(Colombia) Sebastián Garzón	(Colombia) Sebastián Garzón	DEForce Racing
2	Streets of St. Petersburg	(Australia) Eddie Beswick	(Brazil) Leonardo Escorpioni	(Colombia) Sebastián Garzón	(Colombia) Sebastián Garzón	DEForce Racing
3	Indianapolis Motor Speedway Road Course	(United States) Oliver Wheldon	(Australia) Brad Majman	(Canada) Anthony Martella	(Canada) Anthony Martella	Exclusive Autosport
4	Indianapolis Motor Speedway Road Course	(United States) Oliver Wheldon	(Australia) Liam Loiacono	(Colombia) Sebastián Garzón	(Colombia) Sebastián Garzón	DEForce Racing
5	Indianapolis Motor Speedway Road Course	(United States) Oliver Wheldon	(Australia) Eddie Beswick	(Australia) Brad Majman	(Australia) Brad Majman	Pabst Racing
6	Lucas Oil Indianapolis Raceway Park	(United States) Evan Cooley	(Canada) Anthony Martella	(Canada) Anthony Martella	(United States) Evan Cooley	Exclusive Autosport
7	Road America	(Australia) Brad Majman	(Australia) Brad Majman	(Australia) Eddie Beswick	(Australia) Eddie Beswick	Pabst Racing
8	Road America	(Australia) Brad Majman	(Colombia) Sebastián Garzón	(Canada) Anthony Martella	(Canada) Anthony Martella	Exclusive Autosport
9	Road America	(Colombia) Sebastián Garzón	(Australia) Eddie Beswick	(Australia) Brad Majman	(Australia) Brad Majman	Pabst Racing
10	Mid-Ohio Sports Car Course	(United States) Ryan Giannetta	(Australia) Brad Majman	(Australia) Eddie Beswick	(Australia) Eddie Beswick	Pabst Racing
11	Mid-Ohio Sports Car Course	(Canada) Anthony Martella	(United States) Ryan Giannetta	(Canada) Anthony Martella	(Canada) Anthony Martella	Exclusive Autosport
12	Portland International Raceway	(United States) Oliver Wheldon	(United States) Oliver Wheldon	(United States) Oliver Wheldon	(United States) Oliver Wheldon	VRD Racing
13	Portland International Raceway	(United States) Oliver Wheldon	(Colombia) Sebastián Garzón	(United States) Oliver Wheldon	(United States) Oliver Wheldon	VRD Racing
14	Streets of Markham	(Colombia) Sebastián Garzón (Note: Qualifying was cancelled due to delays in track preparation. The grid was set based on championship points standings and no point for pole position was awarded.)	(Colombia) Sebastián Garzón	(Colombia) Sebastián Garzón	(Colombia) Sebastián Garzón	DEForce Racing
15	Streets of Markham	(Colombia) Sebastián Garzón	(Colombia) Sebastián Garzón	(Australia) Brad Majman	(Australia) Brad Majman	Pabst Racing
16	Road America	(Australia) Eddie Beswick	(Australia) Brad Majman	(Australia) Eddie Beswick	(Australia) Eddie Beswick	Pabst Racing
17	Road America	(United States) Oliver Wheldon	(United States) Ayrton Cahan	(Australia) Eddie Beswick	(United States) Ryan Giannetta	VRD Racing
18	Road America	(United States) Oliver Wheldon (Note: Oliver Wheldon was awarded the point for pole position after setting the second best lap in qualifying, but received a three-place grid penalty for causing an incident in the previous race. As a result, Eddie Beswick started the race from pole position.)	(United States) Wesley Gundler	(Australia) Eddie Beswick	(Australia) Eddie Beswick	Pabst Racing

== Season report ==
=== First half ===
The 2026 USF2000 Championship's first weekend was a double-header around the Streets of St. Petersburg, where DEForce Racing's Sebastián Garzón topped the qualifying session to claim pole position for the first race. Exclusive Autosport's Anthony Martella overtook him entering the first turn, but a spin and subsequent contact saw him eliminated as Garzón resumed the lead ahead of VRD's João Vergara and Zanella's Leonardo Escorpioni. The race resumed on lap four, but no further changes to the podium positions followed. Pole position for the second race went to Pabst Racing's Eddie Beswick. Garzón started third and moved past Pabst's Brad Majman right away before using a safety car restart to claim the lead on lap six. Escorpioni followed him through, but ran wide and lost the place again. Garzón managed the race to end the weekend with two wins.

A triple-header at Indianapolis Motor Speedway followed, where VRD's debutant Oliver Wheldon claimed pole position for all three races. However, Martella took the lead at the first corner and led every lap to secure his second career USF2000 victory. His teammate Evan Cooley slotted into second early on before Garzón eventually overtook him on lap 11 to claim the place. Wheldon's debut race ended early following contact with Pabst's Brad Majman. Race two was held in heavy rain and Wheldon initially held on to the lead. Garzón started fourth but had moved into second by turn 4 before taking the lead exiting turn 9. He pulled away to win as Wheldon had to defend from Martella, before Cooley overtook both cars on lap 8 to claim second place. The third race was dry again, and for the third time, Wheldon was unable to hold on to his pole position advantage past the first lap. This time, it was Majman who took the lead away from him in turn 7, but Wheldon kept close throughout the race. He tried retaking first place on the final lap, but Majman prevailed to take victory. Garzón took third after rising up the order through the latter part of the race, thereby extending his championship lead to 47 points over Majman.

Pole position for the season's sole oval race at IRP went to Cooley with a 20.8185-second laptime that toppled the lap record set in 2000. He lost the race lead to Martella right at the start as Exclusive's Gabriel Cahan and Garzón slotted in behind. The top four gapped the rest of the field until Martella encountered lapped traffic. On lap 43, he tried lapping JHDD's Cal Peter when the latter spun, clipped the leader and sent him into retirement. Cooley inherited the lead and took the win as Garzón in third grew his points lead again.

Three races at Road America concluded the first half of the season. Majman was fastest in both qualifying sessions to take pole position for the first two races. In the first race, Majman's advantage lasted until a restart on lap three, when Beswick swept past him into turn one. Majman spent the rest of the race working to get back past him, but found no success and took second. Third initially went to Martella, before a blocking penalty handed the podium to Wheldon as points leader Garzón took fifth. The second race also saw an early restart. This time, Majman held on to the lead, before Martella pulled alongside him on lap six and got past. Once again, Majman was unable to retake the lead and finished second as Cooley completed the podium. Setting the fastest lap in race two handed Garzón pole position for race three, before Majman took the lead right away. A huge airborne crash for Cooley followed, who rolled and flew into the catchfence at turn 4. Cooley escaped with a minor hand injury, and the race never got back into rhythm from then on. Only four laps of green flag racing followed, allowing Majman to take victory as Beswick took second. Garzón took third, his lead over Majman now reduced to 30 points.

=== Second half ===
Rounds ten and eleven were held at Mid-Ohio. VRD's Ryan Giannetta took pole position for the first race, which began with Wheldon flipping across another car, before the resulting caution turned into a red flag after a power outage at the track. Two more cautions followed after the race resumed, one of which saw the retirement of points leader Garzón, while Giannetta at the front lost out to eventual winner Beswick as well as Vergara and Majman. Race two, delayed and shortened due to inclement weather, saw Martella start from pole position. He managed two caution periods and subsequent restarts, absorbing pressure from Giannetta behind him. He remained faultless to take victory after leading every lap as Giannetta secured his maiden series podium. Garzón took third, but his race one non-finish meant Majman closed up to 19 points behind him.

Two races at Portland followed, where Weldon claimed pole position in qualifying. Four cars were eliminated in the opening turn of the first race, before Wheldon lost out to both Beswick and Cooley after the restart. He kept close to second place, and an attacking move led to front-wing damage for Cooley, forcing him to pit and handing second place to Wheldon. Race leader Beswick then retired after a sudden suspension failure, allowing Wheldon to take a lead that would ultimately lead to his maiden victory. Martella took second ahead of Gianetta as points leader Garzón came fourteenth after a late spin. Wheldon followed his first win with a controlled second race that saw him lead throughout two caution periods to claim a second victory. Garzón took second, while Majman lost a podium to Cooley after a post-race penalty as he fell to 29 points behind Garzón.

The penultimate weekend at the new Markham Street Circuit began with delays due to incomplete barrier construction that saw qualifying cancelled. Garzón therefore took pole position as the points leader, holding his lead as Beswick dropped from third to 21st on the opening lap. Garzón and Majman led the field through a 14-lap race punctuated by two safety car periods, while Cooley finished third. The front row for the second race was the same, and it began with a lengthy caution period after a three-car crash and two further incidents under yellow flags. Garzón ran wide on the restart and fell to third behind Majman and Wheldon, before another multi-car crash. The final restart caused more contact, with Martella wiping out Garzón. Majman led Wheldon and Beswick to the finish, with Garzón classified fifteenth and his championship lead reduced to 13 points.

Road America hosted three more races to bring the season to an end. Beswick claimed pole position for race one in qualifying and led Vergara as Garzón and Majman collided while fightin on lap two. Both fell to the rear of the field, which meant Majman's unchallenged victory ahead of Cooley and Vergara saw him close up to the two title contenders. Pole position for race two went to Wheldon, and he led Beswick until two incidents happened in succession: Majman hit the rear of another car entering turn five, before Wheldon and Beswick made contact in turn four one lap later. That saw four of the top five drivers out of contention at once, handing the lead to Giannetta, who took his maiden victory ahead of Cahan. Garzón took third place, handing him a 27-point lead entering the final race. Beswick had pole position for that one, but Wheldon started first after a penalty for the former. Cooley rose from seventh to first with a great start, before Beswick took the lead one lap later. Wheldon also got back in front of Cooley soon after, as Garzón slotted into fourth. The order then stabilized and Beswick took the fourth win of his campaign, but fourth place was more than enough for Garzón to secure the championship title.

== Championship standings ==
=== Drivers' Championship ===
Scoring system

Position	**1st**	**2nd**	**3rd**	**4th**	**5th**	**6th**	**7th**	**8th**	**9th**	**10th**	**11th**	**12th**	**13th**	**14th**	**15th**	**16th**	**17th**	**18th**	**19th**	**20th+**
Points	30	25	22	19	17	15	14	13	12	11	10	9	8	7	6	5	4	3	2	1
Points (O)	45	38	33	29	26	23	21	20	18	17	15	14	12	11	9	8	6	5	3	2

- The driver who qualified on pole was awarded one additional point.
- One point was awarded to the driver who led the most laps in a race.
- One point was awarded to the driver who set the fastest lap during the race.

Pos.	Driver	STP		IMS			IRP	ROA1			MOH		POR		MAR		ROA2			Points
1	(Colombia) Sebastián Garzón	**1***	1*	2	1*	3	3	5	4	**3**	12	3	14	2	**1***	**15**	17	3	4	383
2	(Australia) Brad Majman	4	4	15	5	1*	5	**2**	**2**	1*	3	4	6	13	2	1*	18	13	5	354
3	(Australia) Eddie Beswick	20	**2**	5	6	5	8	1*	5	2	1*	15	16	5	7	3	**1***	12*	1*	339
4	(United States) Evan Cooley	22	23	3	2	4	**1**	4	3	23	13	10	15	3	3	4	2	18	3	294
5	(United States) Oliver Wheldon			**20**	**3**	**2**	13	3	6	4	18	11	**1***	**1***	5	2	16	**10**	**2**	282
6	(Brazil) João Vergara	2	6	7	11	20	6	10	8	6	2	5	4	4	22	9	3	11	16	257
7	(United States) Ryan Giannetta	7	7	16	10	18	10	7	7	22	**4**	2	3	9	19	7	8	1	11	242
8	(United States) Gabriel Cahan	8	13	8	19	11	2	19	9	17	5	6	19	7	12	17	7	2	9	214
9	(United States) Wesley Gundler	10	11	18	9	8	11	14	15	8	11	8	5	8	6	11	5	9	6	213
10	(Canada) Anthony Martella	21	22	1*	4	19	18*	9	1*	5	17	**1***	2	21	4	14				209
11	(United States) Ayrton Cahan	13	10	6	7	6	12	6	12	7	9	9	11	19	23	8	4	16	18	193
12	(South Africa) Wian Boshoff	6	14	10	14	16	7	13	10	10	8	12	8	14	16	12	12	17	17	167
13	(Canada) Lucas Nanji	5	9	19	13	17	17	12	16	21	19	7	7	15	8	16	11	5	8	158
14	(United States) Thomas Nordquist	15	15	17	15	9	9	20	14	20	10	18	18	17	11	6	10	4	12	146
15	(United States) Jack Mohrhardt	17	19	13	16	15	16	22	18	13	7	16	12	18	15	10	15	8	15	118
16	(United States) Cal Peter	14	24	12	8	14	19	24	23	24	6	17	21	12	20	13	14	6	13	112
17	(Australia) Liam Loiacono	11	18	4	12	7	4	11	24	19	15	14	Wth	Wth						111
18	(United States) Connor Aspley	16	21					15	11	15	14	19	20	20			6	7	7	82
19	(Brazil) Naim Saleh	DNS	17					21	21	12	16	13	13	11	9	21	13	14	14	82
20	(United States) Kaylee Countryman	18	20	9	18	13		17	19	14			10	10	13	19				72
21	(Mexico) Elias Vignola			11	17	10		16	20	11					17	18				48
22	(United States) Brenden Cooley						15								14	22	9	15	10	46
23	(Brazil) Leonardo Escorpioni	3	3																	45
24	(United Kingdom) Max Cuthbert												9	16	10	5				45
25	(Sweden) Erik Holm	DNS	16	14	20	12	14													33
26	(Canada) Cole Medeiros							8	13	16					18	20				30
27	(United States) Teddy Musella	12	8																	22
28	(United States) Colin Aitken	9	12																	21
29	(United States) Brady Golan	19	5																	19
30	(Poland) Karol Pasiewicz												17	6						19
31	(United States) Grant Mitchell							23	17	9										17
32	(Canada) Leonardo Serravalle							18	22	18										7
33	(United States) Dean Pedersen														21	23				2
—	(United States) Maddie Colleran							DNS	DNS	DNS										0
Pos.	Driver	STP		IMS			IRP	ROA1			MOH		POR		MAR		ROA2			Points

Color	Result
Gold	Winner
Silver	2nd place
Bronze	3rd place
Green	4th & 5th place
Light Blue	6th–10th place
Dark Blue	Finished (Outside Top 10)
Purple	Did not finish
Red	Did not qualify (DNQ)
Brown	Withdrawn (Wth)
Black	Disqualified (DSQ)
White	Did not start (DNS)
Blank	Did not participate

**In-line notation**
**Bold**	Pole position (1 point)
Italics	Ran fastest race lap (1 point)
*	Led most race laps (1 point); Not awarded if more than one driver led most laps
Rookie

=== Teams' championship ===
Scoring system

Position	**1st**	**2nd**	**3rd**	**4th**	**5th**	**6th**	**7th**	**8th**	**9th**	**10th+**
Points	22	18	15	12	10	8	6	4	2	1

- Single car teams received 3 bonus points as an equivalency to multi-car teams.
- Only the best two results were counted for teams fielding more than two entries.

Pos.	Team	STP		IMS			IRP	ROA1			MOH		POR		MAR		ROA2			Points
1	Pabst Racing	4	2	5	5	1	5	1	2	1	1	4	5	5	2	1	1	5	1	449
1	Pabst Racing	5	4	11	6	5	8	2	5	2	3	7	6	11	7	3	8	10	5	449
2	Exclusive Autosport	8	8	1	2	4	1	4	1	5	5	1	2	3	3	4	2	2	3	412
2	Exclusive Autosport	11	10	3	4	6	2	6	3	7	8	6	10	7	4	8	4	7	7	412
3	VRD Racing	2	6	6	3	2	6	3	6	4	2	2	1	1	5	2	3	1	2	382
3	VRD Racing	7	7	10	9	11	10	7	7	6	4	5	3	4	11	7	6	8	8	382
4	DEForce Racing	1	1	2	1	3	3	5	4	3	9	3	11	2	1	6	7	3	4	293
4	DEForce Racing	13	5	9	12	9	9	11	9	11	11	12	13	13	10	12	12	4	9	293
5	ENVE Motorsports	9	9	12	8	8	11	10	10	8	10	8	4	8	6	9	5	9	6	125
6	JHDD powered by ECR	10	12	4	7	7	4	8	12	12	6	10	8	9	8	5	9	6	10	109
6	JHDD powered by ECR	12	13	7	10	10	12	12	13	13	12	11	9	10	9	11	10	11	11	109
7	Peterman Fisher Hartman Racing	6	11	8	11	12	7	9	8	10	7	9	7	12	12	10	11	12	12	102
8	Zanella Racing	3	3					13	11	9										40
8	Zanella Racing							DNS	DNS	DNS										40
9	Olivia Racing												12	6						15
Pos.	Team	STP		IMS			IRP	ROA1			MOH		POR		MAR		ROA2			Points

== See also ==
- 2026 IndyCar Series
- 2026 Indy NXT
- 2026 USF Pro 2000 Championship
- 2026 USF Juniors
