= Eddie Beswick =

Australian racing driver (born 2005)

- Nationality: Australia
- Born: Edison Beswick; 30 May 2005 (age 21) Sydney, Australia

USF2000 Championship career
- Debut season: 2025
- Current team: Pabst Racing
- Car number: 23
- Former teams: Synergy Motorsport
- Starts: 38
- Wins: 4
- Podiums: 8
- Poles: 2
- Fastest laps: 2
- Best finish: 3rd in 2026

Previous series
- 2022–24 2022, 2024: Australian Formula Ford Championship; Victorian Formula Ford Championship

Championship titles
- 2024: Australian Formula Ford Championship

Edison Beswick (born 30 May 2005) is an Australian racing driver. He currently competes in the 2025 USF2000 Championship driving for Synergy Motorsport.

== Career ==
=== Australian Formula Ford Championship ===
==== 2024 ====
For 2024, Beswick returned to the series for his third season after competing in 2022 and 2023. He would once again drive for Synergy Motorsport. Beswick would have a successful start to the season, with three podiums and a win in the first three races of the championship at Bathurst. From there, he was a consistent title challenger, racking up two more wins at Sydney and Symmons Plains. Beswick's consistency throughout the season paid off as he went on to win the championship.

=== USF2000 Championship ===
==== 2024 ====
Alongside his full-time campaigns in the Australian Formula Ford Championship and Victorian Formula Ford Championship, Beswick made his debut in the 2024 USF2000 Championship at Toronto driving for Exclusive Autosport. He did not have a successful outing, as he retired in both races.

==== 2025 ====
On the 21 January 2025, it was announced that Beswick would compete full-time in the 2025 USF2000 Championship. He would be driving for Synergy Motorsport, which is the Australian based team he had competed with for a majority of his car racing career up until that point.

== Racing record ==
=== Racing career summary ===
Season	Series	Team	Races	Wins	Poles	F/Laps	Podiums	Points	Position
2022	Australian Formula Ford Championship	Synergy Motorsport	14	0	0	0	1	72	13th
2022	Victorian Formula Ford Championship	Synergy Motorsport	6	1	0	1	6	178	9th
2023	Australian Formula Ford Championship	Synergy Motorsport	21	0	0	1	4	156	8th
2023	F1600 Championship Series	Drivers Services	6	2	0	0	3	213	14th
2024	USF2000 Championship	Exclusive Autosport	2	0	0	0	0	11	28th
2024	Victorian Formula Ford Championship	Synergy Motorsport	15	2	1	0	8	356	**2nd**
2024	Australian Formula Ford Championship	Synergy Motorsport	20	3	0	3	11	257	**1st**
2024	New South Wales Formula Ford Championship	Synergy Motorsport	15	2	0	2	11	482	**1st**
2025	USF2000 Championship	Synergy Motorsport	18	0	0	0	1	195	10th
2025	Atlantic Championship - Open	Synergy Motorsport	2	0	0	0	0	40	18th
2026	USF2000 Championship	Pabst Racing	18	4	2	2	7	339	**3rd**

* Season still in progress.

=== Australian Formula Ford Championship results ===
(key) (Races in bold indicate pole position) (Races in italics indicate fastest lap) (Races with * indicate most race laps led)

Year	Team	1	2	3	4	5	6	7	8	9	10	11	12	13	14	15	16	17	18	19	20	21	Rank	Points
2024	Synergy Motorsport	BAT; 1; 3	BAT; 2; 2	**BAT**; **3**; 1	WIN; 1; 14	WIN; 2; 5	WIN; 3 C†	SYD; 1; 2	**SYD**; **2**; 1	SYD; 3; 3	MOR; 1; 2	MOR; 2; 2	MOR; 3; 5	SYM; 1; 5	**SYM**; **2**; 1	SYM; 3; 12	SAN; 1; 2	SAN; 2; 2	SAN; 3; 5	PHI; 1; 14	PHI; 2; 8	PHI; 3; 9	1st	257

† Race was cancelled.

=== American open-wheel racing results ===
==== F1600 Championship ====
(key) (Races in bold indicate pole position) (Races in italics indicate fastest lap)

Year	Team	1	2	3	4	5	6	7	8	9	10	11	12	13	14	15	16	17	18	19	20	21	Rank	Pts
2023	Drivers Services	RAT; 1	RAT; 2	RAT; 3	MOH; 1	MOH; 2	MOH; 3	LRP; 1	LRP; 2	LRP; 3	PITT; 1	PITT; 2	PITT; 3	RA; 1; 9	RA; 2; 1	RA; 3; 11	NJMP; 1; 6	NJMP; 2; 2	NJMP; 3; 1	SP; 1	SP; 2	SP; 3	14th	213

==== USF2000 Championship ====
(key) (Races in bold indicate pole position) (Races in italics indicate fastest lap) (Races with * indicate most race laps led)

Year	Team	1	2	3	4	5	6	7	8	9	10	11	12	13	14	15	16	17	18	Rank	Points
2024	Exclusive Autosport	STP; 1	STP; 2	NOL; 1	NOL; 2	NOL; 3	IMS; 1	IMS; 2	IRP	ROA; 1	ROA; 2	MOH; 1	MOH; 2	MOH; 3	TOR; 1; 14	TOR; 2; 17	POR; 1	POR; 2	POR; 3	28th	11
2025	Synergy Motorsport	STP; 1; 10	STP; 2; 19	NOL; 1; 11	NOL; 2; 14	NOL; 3; 17	IMS; 1; 9	IMS; 2; 8	IRP; 14	ROA; 1; 9	ROA; 2; 10	MOH; 1; 10	MOH; 2; 7	MOH; 3; 13	TOR; 1; 2	TOR; 2; 18	POR; 1; 6	POR; 2; 7	POR; 3; 9	10th	195
2026	Pabst Racing	STP; 1; 20	**STP**; **2**; 2	IMS; 1; 5	IMS; 2; 6	IMS; 3; 5	IRP; 8	ROA1; 1; 1*	ROA1; 2; 5	ROA1; 3; 2	MOH; 1; 1*	MOH; 2; 15	POR; 1; 16	POR; 2; 5	MAR; 1; 7	MAR; 2; 3	**ROA2**; **1**; 1*	ROA2; 2; 12*	**ROA2**; **3**; 1*	3rd	339
