= 2024 Australian Formula Ford Series =

Motor racing competition

The 2024 Australian Formula Ford Series is a motor racing competition sanctioned by Motorsport Australia for duratec formula ford racing cars held in Australia. The series represents the 54th season of the Australian Formula Ford Championship. It is recognised as a prominent developmental series for up-and-coming drivers who often advance to higher levels of motorsport. The winner of the series is rewarded with a test day in the DJR gen 3 Supercar.

Synergy Motorsport Spectrum driver Eddie Beswick won the title with a consistent season performance. The Sydney-based driver secured the title in Race 2 of the final round and won a total of three races and one round. Individual race wins were achieved by Kobi Williams (4), Jack Bussey (4), Harrison Sellars (4), Eddie Beswick (3). Liam Loiacono (3), Cody Maynes-Rutty (1) and Zak Lobko (1).

== Teams and drivers ==
Team	Chassis	No	Driver	Round
Jeremy Mattea	Spectrum 05c	3	(Australia) Jeremy Mattea	1
CoolDrive Auto Parts	Mygale SJ2012	3	(Australia) Jarrod Hurst	6–7
LR Motorsport	Mygale SJ09	5	(Australia) Lachie Mineeff	2–3
Privateer	Spectrum 015	5	(Australia) Giuseppe Imbrogno	6–7
Borland Racing Developments	Spectrum 015	6	(Australia) Paul Zsidy	2–3
Borland Racing Developments	Spectrum 014	11	(Australia) Fraser Hie	1, 4–7
Borland Racing Developments	Spectrum 015	23	(Australia) Joe Fawcett	All
Borland Racing Developments	Spectrum 015	48	(Australia) Jamie Roe	2–3, 6–7
Borland Racing Developments	Spectrum 014b	74	(Australia) Jack Bussey	All
Borland Racing Developments	Spectrum 012	94	(Australia) Kobi Williams	All
Borland Racing Developments	Spectrum 012	96	(Australia) Bailey Collins	1, 6–7
Lobko Motorsport	Mygale SJ13	7	(Australia) Zak Lobko	1–5
MC Corsa	Spirit WL06	12	(Australia) Michel Stephan	3
Altatek Racing	Spectrum 015	13	(Australia) Harrison Sellars	All
Altatek Racing	Spectrum 015	41	(Australia) Matt Holmes	5
Altatek Racing	Spectrum 015	88	(Australia) Dominic Carosa	1
Adrian Sarkis Racing	Mygale SJ09a	14	(Australia) Adrian Sarkis	3
Synergy Motorsport	Spectrum 012	17	(Australia) Kyle Cotter	1, 3, 5–6
Synergy Motorsport	Spectrum 014	30	(Australia) Eddie Beswick	All
Synergy Motorsport	Spectrum 014	69	(Australia) Cody Maynes-Rutty	All
Gforce Motorsport	Mygale SJ2018a	24	(Australia) Seth Burchartz	6
Gforce Motorsport	Mygale SJ11a	55	(Australia) Nico Mendez	1
CHE Racing Team	Mygale SJ12	29	(Australia) Imogen Radburn	All
CHE Racing Team	Mygale SJ13	27	(Australia) Daniel Frougas	All
CHE Racing Team	Mygale SJ10	47	(Australia) Lachlan Strickland	All
PGS Kinetic Motorsport	Mygale SJ10a	42	(Australia) Carly Fleming	6–7
BF Racing	Mygale SJ2011a	43	(Australia) Liam Loiacono	All
BF Racing	Mygale SJ2012	88	(Australia) Lachlan Evenett	2–7
BF Racing	Mygale SJ09a	97	(Australia) Oli Loiacono	4
Kaleb Belak Racing	Spectrum 014	43	(Australia) Kaleb Belak	3, 7
Listec Racing Cars	Mygale SJ10a	53	(Australia) William Lowing	1, 3–4
Apogee Motorsport Services	Spectrum 012	56	(Australia) Ethan Fitzgerald	6–7
Jacal Racing	Van Diemen RF06	80	(Australia) Jason Liddel	1, 3
Anglo Australian Motorsport	Spirit WL11	81	(Australia) Byron Lutelu	3
Zero7 Motorsport	Mygale SJ15a	91	(Australia) Logan Eveleigh	1–6

== Calendar ==
The 2024 Calendar comprised 21 races across 7 rounds. Bathurst made a return to the national calendar as well as a consecutive year racing with supercars at Symmons Plains. The calendar also featured a double header following Symmons Plains at Sandown.

Round	Location	Date
1	Mount Panorama Circuit	March 29–31
2	Winton Motor Raceway	April 26–28
3	Sydney Motorsport Park	May 24–26
4	Morgan Park Raceway	June 14–16
5	Symmons Plains Raceway	August 16–18
6	Sandown International Motor Raceway	August 23–25
7	Phillip Island Grand Prix Circuit	October 4–6

== Points ==
Championship points were awarded on a 20–16–14–12–11–10-9-8-7-6-5-4-3-2-1 basis to the top fifteen classified finishers in each race. An additional point was awarded to the driver gaining pole position for the first race at each round. Non-national competitors are not considered in the point score. E.g. A national competitor will move up three spots if three state competitors finish in front of them in a race.

== Format ==
Drivers head out for a single qualifying session that determines the grid for race 1. Following race 1 the finishing order after penalties are applied is the starting order for race 2. The same applies to race 3 of the results of race 2.

== Results ==
Pos.	Driver	(New South Wales) BAT			(New South Wales) WIN			(New South Wales) SYD			(Queensland) MOR			(Tasmania) SYM			(Victoria (state)) SAN			(Victoria (state)) PHI			Pen	Pts
Pos.	Driver	R1	R2	R3	R1	R2	R3	R1	R2	R3	R1	R2	R3	R1	R2	R3	R1	R2	R3	R1	R2	R3	Pen	Pts
1	(Australia) Eddie Beswick	3	2	1	14	5		2	1	3	2	2	5	5	1	12	2	2	5	14	8	9		257
2	(Australia) Kobi Williams	13	4	2	3	12		1	2	1	4	5	3	3	3	Ret	Ret	9	8	1	1	2		244
3	(Australia) Jack Bussey	6	17	7	1	13		5	5	4	3	3	8	1	2	1	10	6	10	5	6	1		236
4	(Australia) Liam Loiacono	5	15	6	6	3		3	6	15	1	1	1	2	8	Ret	9	5	6	2	3	3		234
5	(Australia) Harrison Sellars	1	12	8	2	2		10	8	6	7	Ret	12	6	4	4	1	1	1	11	4	5		228
6	(Australia) Cody Maynes-Rutty	2	1	3	11	6		13	3	2	Ret	7	2	8	Ret	5	3	3	2	4	2	4		227
7	(Australia) Daniel Frougas	4	3	4	9	4		6	14	9	6	6	4	10	7	3	7	8	4	8	10	7		194
8	(Australia) Joe Fawcett	9	6	5	5	11		11	18	11	Ret	8	7	7	6	2	5	4	3	Ret	9	Ret		152
9	(Australia) Lachlan Stricklan	Ret	8	10	8	7		9	7	7	8	Ret	9	15	9	6	8	10	7	12	15	10		131
10	(Australia) Lachlan Evenett				Ret	16		7	9	5	5	4	6	4	5	13	4	7	Ret	3	11	Ret		127
11	(Australia) Imogen Radburn	12	7	Ret	Ret	9		12	15	12	9	11	10	13	12	8	12	12	11	13	12	11		97
12	(Australia) Zak Lobko	7	Ret	11	4	1		4	4	Ret	Ret	9	Ret											77
13	(Australia) Fraser Hie	Ret	WD	WD							11	10	11	12	11	10	11	11	12	7	5	8		77
14	(Australia) Kyle Cotter	10	5	9				14	16	13				11	13	9	14	Ret	14					54
15	(Australia) Logan Eveleigh	Ret	11	Ret	12	8		17	11	16	10	Ret	Ret	14	10	7	Ret	Ret	19				-10	43
16	(Australia) William Lowing	8	Ret	WD				8	10	8	WD	WD	WD											30
17	(Australia) Matt Holmes													9	14	11								14
18	(Australia) Lachlan Mineeff				13	10		DNS	13	Ret														14
19	(Australia) Domenic Carosa	14	13	12																				11
20	(Australia) Jamie Rowe				7	14		20	12	10							13	DNQ	13	6	14	17		11
21	(Australia) Nico Mendez	Ret	9	Ret																				7
-	(Australia) Bailey Collins	11	10	Ret													6	18	9	15	7	6		0
-	(Australia) Paul Zsidy				10	15		19	20	19														0
-	(Australia) Ethan Fitzgerald																15	13	Ret	9	19	12		0
-	(Australia) Oli Loiacono										12	Ret	WD											0
-	(Australia) Seth Burchartz																16	15	16					0
-	(Australia) Carly Fleming																18	17	15	18	18	16		0
-	(Australia) Jarrod Hurst																19	16	18	16	16	14		0
-	(Australia) Giuseppe Imbrogno																17	14	17	10	13	13		0
-	(Australia) Adrian Sarkis							15	17	14														0
-	(Australia) Jason Liddel	15	14	13				DNS	Ret	21														0
-	(Australia) Kaleb Belak							16	Ret	18										17	17	15		0
-	(Australia) Micheal Stephen							21	Ret	WD														0
-	(Australia) Byron Lutelu							18	19	17														0
Pos.	Driver	(New South Wales) BAT			(New South Wales) WIN			(New South Wales) SYD			(Queensland) MOR			(Tasmania) SYM			(Victoria (state)) SAN			(Victoria (state)) PHI			Pen	Pts
Pos.	Driver	R1	R2	R3	R1	R2	R3	R1	R2	R3	R1	R2	R3	R1	R2	R3	R1	R2	R3	R1	R2	R3	Pen	Pts

Note: Winton race 3 was cancelled after a big crash involving Daniel Frougas and Jack Bussey

Pole Position Winners
Round	Driver	Team
1	Jack Bussey	Borland Racing Developments
2	Jack Bussey	Borland Racing Developments
3	Kobi Williams	Privateer/Borland Racing Development
4	Liam Loiacono	BF Racing
5	Kobi Williams	Privateer/Borland Racing Development
6	Harrison Sellars	Altatek
7	Liam Loiacono	BF Racing

Colour	Result
Gold	Winner
Silver	Second place
Bronze	Third place
Green	Points classification
Blue	Non-points classification
Blue	Non-classified finish (NC)
Purple	Retired, not classified (Ret)
Red	Did not qualify (DNQ)
Red	Did not pre-qualify (DNPQ)
Black	Disqualified (DSQ)
White	Did not start (DNS)
White	Withdrew (WD)
White	Race cancelled (C)
Blank	Did not practice (DNP)
Blank	Did not arrive (DNA)
Blank	Excluded (EX)

Round Winners
Round	Winner	Second place	Third place
1	Eddie Beswick	Cody Maynes-Rutty	Daniel Frougas
2	Zak Lobko	Harrison Sellars	Liam Loiacono
3	Kobi Williams	Eddie Beswick	Jack Bussey
4	Liam Loiacono	Eddie Beswick	Kobi Williams
5	Jack Bussey	Joe Fawcett	Eddie Beswick
6	Harrison Sellars	Cody Maynes-Rutty	Eddie Beswick
7	Kobi Williams	Liam Loiacono	Jack Bussey
