= Loiacono =

Loiacono is an Italian surname. Notable people with the surname include:

- Giuseppe Loiacono (born 1991), Italian football player
- Liam Loiacono (born 2008), Australian racing driver
