= Group 3J Improved Production Cars =

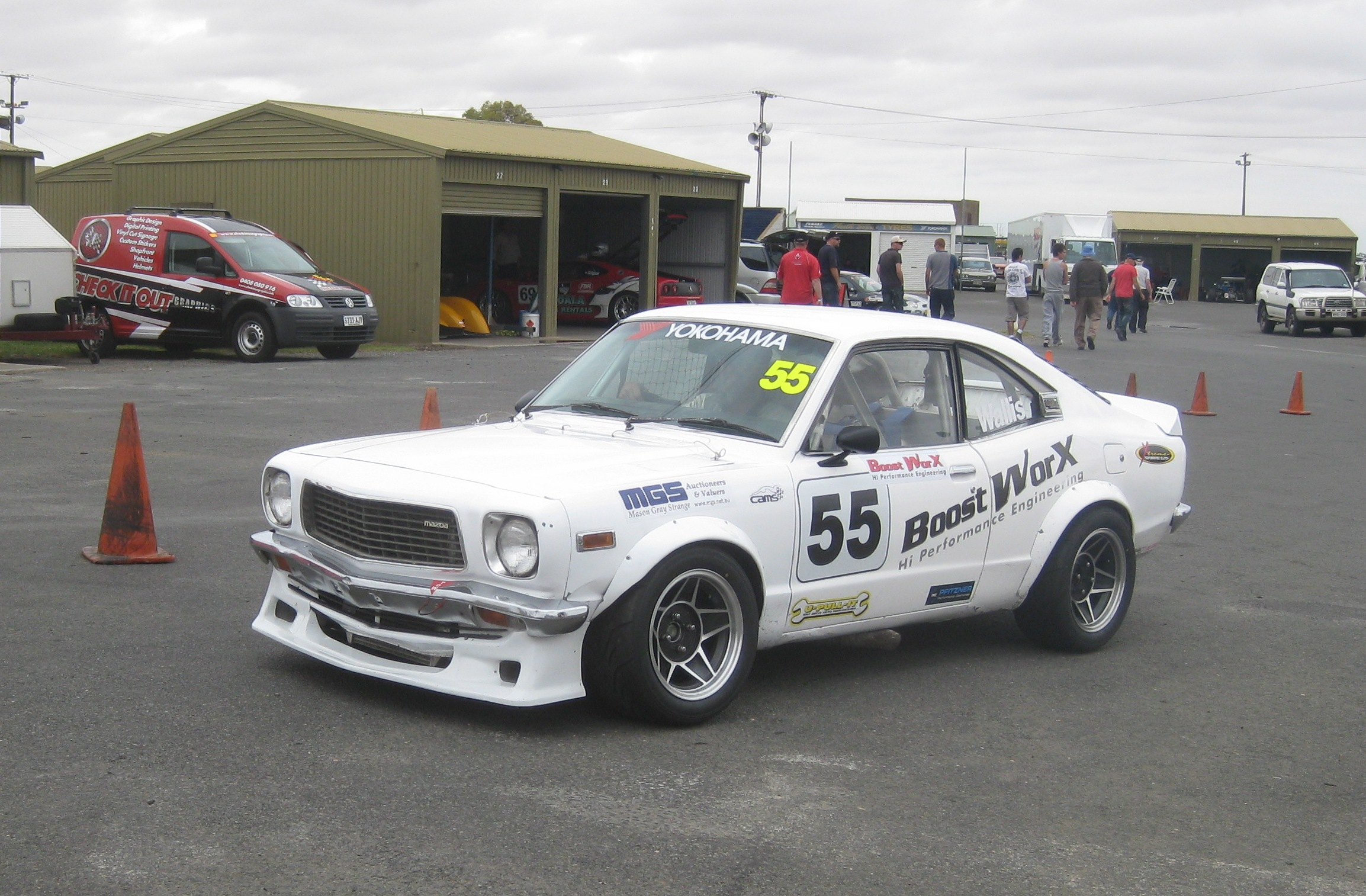
Tony Wallis (Mazda 808) won the 2011 Australian Improved Production Nationals

Group 3J Improved Production Cars is an Australian motor racing category for modified road cars.

The category is defined by Motorsport Australia as being for race vehicles derived from registered production automobiles, with limited modifications to improve performance and reliability. Cars must be mass-produced touring cars, the model of which has been:

- homologated by the FIA in Group A or
- commercially available in Australia as a new car through a manufacturer’s dealer network, with at least 200 examples having been registered for road use in Australia or
- otherwise recognised by MA for Group 3J

Modifications to engines, brakes and suspension are permitted and a different engine, from the same manufacturer as the body shell, may be utilised. Cars may be fitted with wheel arch flares, front air dams and rear deck spoilers.

Improved Production Cars compete in one of four of engine capacity classes:

- 0 – 1600 cc
- 1600 – 2000 cc
- 2000 – 3000 cc
- 3000 – 6000 cc

The Improved Production Racing Association of Australia (IPRA) is recognised by MA as the sole entity representing competitors in the category. State championships are conducted in every Australian State and the Northern Territory and the Australian Improved Production Nationals are held annually on a state rotational basis.

The category was formerly known as 3J Club Cars. The name Group 3J Club Cars was used up to the year 2000, and Group 3J Improved Production Cars from 2001.

== Australian Improved Production Nationals ==
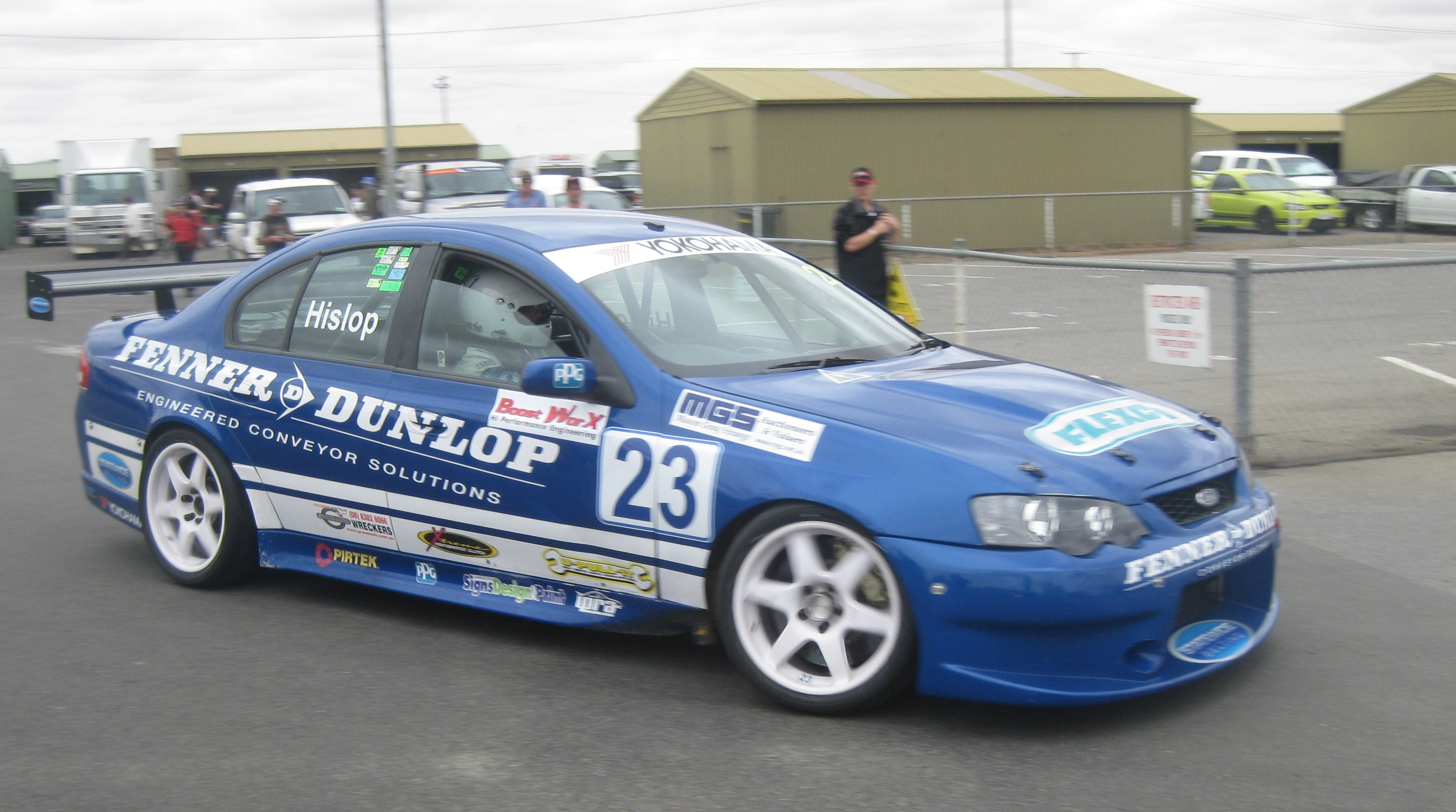
Ray Hislop (Ford BF Falcon) at the 2011 Nationals

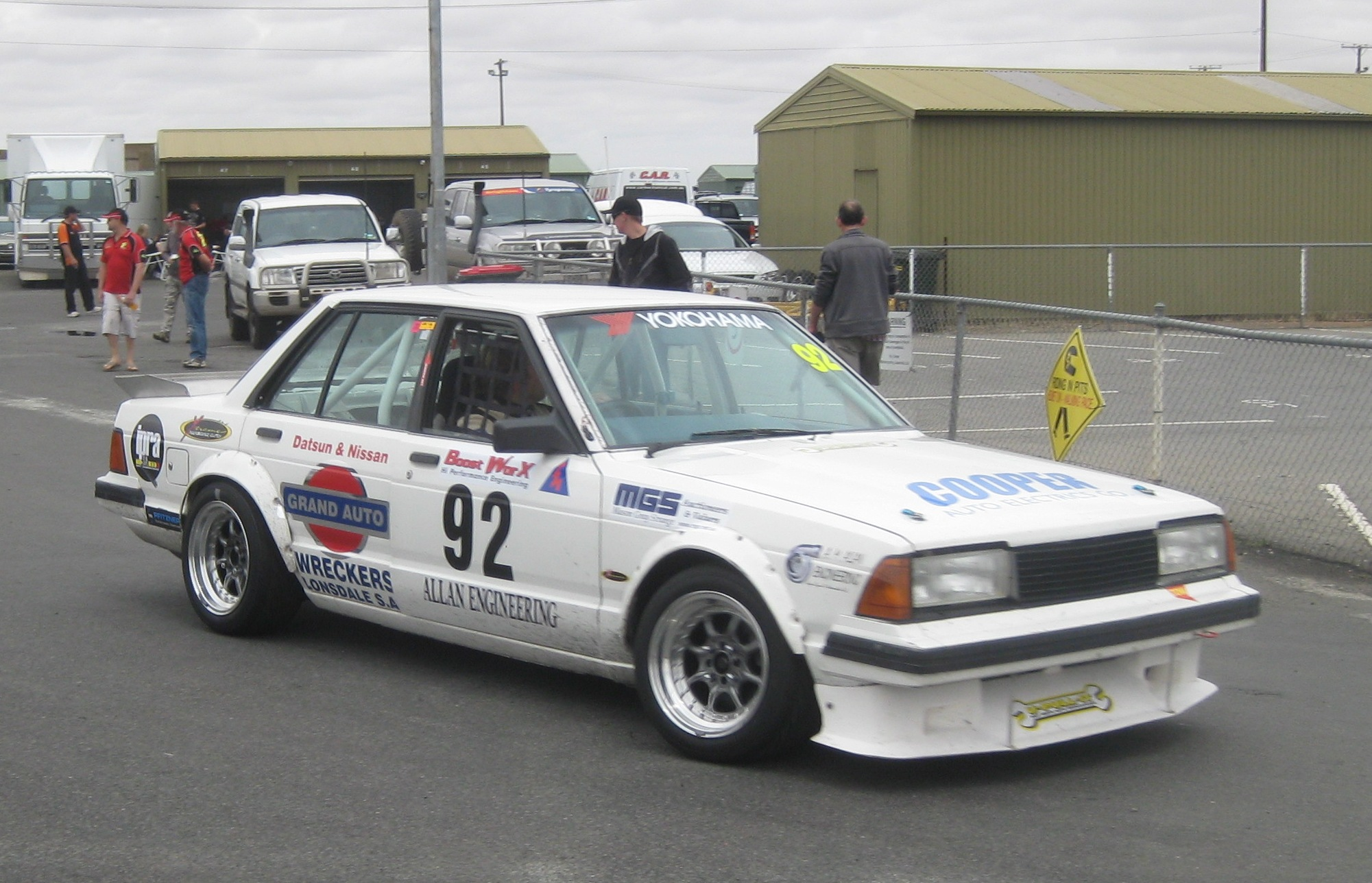
Adam Allan (Nissan Bluebird) at the 2011 Nationals

Year	Winning driver	Car	Circuit	State	Date
1991	Terry Lewis	Mazda RX-3	Winton Raceway	Victoria	
1992	Phil Morriss	Datsun 1600	Winton Raceway	Victoria	
1993	Andrew Brown	Mazda RX-3	Eastern Creek International Raceway	New South Wales	
1994	Ken Douglas	Mazda RX-7	Phillip Island Grand Prix Circuit	Victoria	
1995	Ken Douglas	Mazda RX-7	Mallala Motor Sport Park	South Australia	
1996	Roger Hurd	Holden LX Torana	Baskerville Raceway	Tasmania	
1997	Roger Hurd	Holden LX Torana	Lakeside International Raceway	Queensland	30 November
1998	Noel McFarlane	Mazda RX-3	Eastern Creek International Raceway	New South Wales	29 November
1999	Andrew Brown	Mazda RX-7	Phillip Island Grand Prix Circuit	Victoria	
2000	Roger Hurd	Holden LX Torana	Mallala Motor Sport Park	South Australia	10 September
2001	Roger Hurd	Holden LX Torana	Symmons Plains International Raceway	Tasmania	24–25 November
2002	Ken Douglas	Mazda RX-7	Queensland Raceway	Queensland	3 November
2003	Wayne Wakefield	Mazda 808	Oran Park Grand Prix Circuit	New South Wales	31 August
2004	Ray Hislop	Ford EB Falcon GT	Phillip Island Grand Prix Circuit	Victoria	2 May
2005	Adam Allan	Datsun 1200	Mallala Motor Sport Park	South Australia	13 November
2006	Scott Fleming	Mazda RX-7	Baskerville Raceway	Tasmania	15 October
2007	David Loftus	Nissan Skyline R32	Morgan Park Raceway	Queensland	30 September
2008	Justin Keys	Mazda RX-3	Oran Park Grand Prix Circuit	New South Wales	9 November
2009	James Atkinson	Holden VX Commodore	Phillip Island Grand Prix Circuit	Victoria	22 November
2010	Kevin Ledger	Subaru Impreza	Barbagallo Raceway	Western Australia	17 October
2011	Tony Wallis	Mazda 808	Mallala Motor Sport Park	South Australia	20 November
2012	Ray Hislop	Ford BF Falcon	Baskerville Raceway	Tasmania	11 November
2013	Over 2 litre: Ray Hislop; Under 2 litre: Bob Jowett	Ford BF Falcon; Honda Civic	Morgan Park Raceway	Queensland	29 September
2014	Over 2 litre: Kevin Ledger; Under 2 litre: Andrew Tendli	Subaru Impreza; Honda Civic	Wakefield Park Raceway	New South Wales	9 November
2015	Over 2 litre: Ray Hislop; Under 2 litre: James McKinnell	Ford BF Falcon; Honda Integra	Hidden Valley Raceway	Northern Territory	12 July
2016	Over 2 litre: Ray Hislop; Under 2 litre: Graeme Cox	Ford BF Falcon; Honda Civic	Phillip Island	Victoria	26–27 November
2017	Over 2 litre: Ray Hislop; Under 2 litre: David Waldon	Ford BF Falcon; Mazda RX-3	Barbagallo Raceway	Western Australia	21–22 October
2018	Over 2 litre: Ray Hislop; Under 2 litre: David Waldon	Ford BF Falcon; Mazda RX-3	The Bend Motorsport Park	South Australia	9–11 November
2019	Ray Hislop	Ford BF Falcon	Baskerville Raceway	Tasmania	16–17 November
2020 – 2021	Not held				
2022	Over 2 litre: Zak Hudson; Under 2 litre: Kurt Macready	Mazda RX-7; Nissan Silvia	Morgan Park Raceway	Queensland	1–2 October
2023	Over 2 litre: Adam Poole; Under 2 litre: Kurt Macready	Holden Monaro; Nissan Silvia	Sydney Motorsport Park	New South Wales	16–18 June
2024	Over 2 litre: Matt Cherry; Under 2 litre: Kurt Macready	Holden Monaro; Nissan Silvia	Hidden Valley Raceway	Northern Territory	19–21 July
2025	Over 2 litre: Adam Poole; Under 2 litre: Brad Vereker	Holden Monaro; Datsun 1200 Coupe	Phillip Island	Victoria	21–23 November

Note: The title was contested as the Club Car Nationals prior to 2001.
