= João Vergara =

Brazilian racing driver (born 2007)

- Nationality: (Brazil) Brazilian
- Born: 28 May 2007 (age 19) São Paulo, Brazil
- Relatives: Oswaldo Negri Jr. (uncle)

USF2000 Championship career
- Debut season: 2026
- Current team: VRD Racing
- Categorisation: FIA Silver
- Car number: 3
- Starts: 18
- Wins: 0
- Podiums: 3
- Poles: 0
- Fastest laps: 0
- Best finish: 6th in 2026

Previous series
- 2024–2025: USF Juniors

João Vergara (born 28 May 2007) is a Brazilian racing driver who competes in the LMP3 Pro class of the Asian Le Mans Cup for CLX Motorsport.

== Personal life ==
Vergara is the nephew of Oswaldo Negri Jr., a fellow racing driver who won the 2012 24 Hours of Daytona.

== Career ==
Vergara began karting in 2018. Racing primarily in Brazil, most notably winning the 2020 Copa São Paulo title in the Junior Max rookie class, before moving to the U.S. in 2021.

In 2022, Vergara made his single-seater debut in the Lucas Oil Formula Car Race Series, before winning a scholarship to race in the series full-time in early 2023. In his only season in the series, Vergara took five wins and eight other podiums to clinch runner-up honors behind Hudson Schwartz.

The following year, Vergara moved to Exclusive Autosport to make his debut in USF Juniors. In his first season in the series, Vergara scored a best result of fourth at Road America and eight other top ten finishes to end the year eighth overall. Switching to VRD Racing for the 2025 season, as a finalist for the 2026–27 IMSA Diverse Driver Scholarship, Vergara began the season with a win and a third-place finish at NOLA. After finishing no lower than fifth at Barber, Vergara took both pole positions in the first Mid-Ohio round and scored his second win of the season in race one. In the remaining three rounds, Vergara finished second in both races of the second Mid-Ohio round and closed out the season with a podium in Portland to secure third in points.

Continuing with VRD for 2026, Vergara moved up to the USF2000 Championship. After finishing second on debut at St. Petersburg, Vergara finished no higher than sixth across the following three rounds, before matching his best result of second in race one at Mid-Ohio and ending the year sixth overall with another podium at Road America.

Towards the end of 2026, Vergara partook in the European Le Mans Series rookie tests in Inter Europol Competition's Ligier JS P325, prior to joining CLX Motorsport to compete in the LMP3 Pro class of the 2026–27 Asian Le Mans Cup.

== Karting record ==
=== Karting career summary ===
Season	Series	Team	Position
2020	Florida Winter Tour – Mini Rok		31st
2021	SKUSA SuperNationals – KA 100 Junior	Orsolon Racing	43rd

== Racing record ==
=== Racing career summary ===
Season	Series	Team	Races	Wins	Poles	F/Laps	Podiums	Points	Position
2022	Lucas Oil Formula Car Race Series		6	0	0	0	0	158	12th
2023	Lucas Oil Formula Car Race Series		15	5	?	?	13	429	**2nd**
2024	USF Juniors	Exclusive Autosport	16	0	0	0	0	158	8th
2025	USF Juniors	VRD Racing	16	2	2	1	6	292	**3rd**
2026	USF2000 Championship	VRD Racing	18	0	0	0	3	257	6th
2026–27	Asian Le Mans Cup – LMP3 Pro	CLX Motorsport							

=== American open-wheel racing results ===
==== USF Juniors ====
(key) (Races in bold indicate pole position) (Races in italics indicate fastest lap) (Races with * indicate most race laps led)

Year	Team	1	2	3	4	5	6	7	8	9	10	11	12	13	14	15	16	Rank	Points
2024	Exclusive Autosport	NOL; 1; 10	NOL; 2; 24	NOL; 3; 13	ALA; 1; 9	ALA; 2; 6	VIR; 1; 9	VIR; 2; 9	VIR; 3; 8	MOH; 1; 20	MOH; 2; 13	ROA; 1; 4	ROA; 2; 7	ROA; 3; 16	POR; 1; 13	POR; 2; 9	POR; 3; 14	8th	158
2025	VRD Racing	NOL; 1; 1*	NOL; 2; 5	NOL; 3; 3	ALA; 1; 4	ALA; 2; 4	ALA; 3; 5	**MOH1**; **1**; 1*	**MOH1**; **2**; 14	MOH2; 1; 2	MOH2; 2; 2*	ROA; 1; 12	ROA; 2; 11	ROA; 3; 20	POR; 1; 2	POR; 2; 6	POR; 3; 6	3rd	292

==== USF2000 Championship ====
(key) (Races in bold indicate pole position) (Races in italics indicate fastest lap) (Races with * indicate most race laps led)

Year	Team	1	2	3	4	5	6	7	8	9	10	11	12	13	14	15	16	17	18	Rank	Points
2026	VRD Racing	STP; 1; 2	STP; 2; 6	IMS; 1; 7	IMS; 2; 11	IMS; 3; 20	IRP; 6	ROA1; 1; 10	ROA1; 2; 8	ROA1; 3; 6	MOH; 1; 2	MOH; 2; 5	POR; 1; 4	POR; 2; 4	MAR; 1; 22	MAR; 2; 9	ROA2; 1; 3	ROA2; 2; 11	ROA2; 3; 16	6th	257
