= Sebastián Garzón =

Colombian racing driver (born 2009)

- Nationality: (Colombia) Colombian
- Born: Sebastián Garzón Orozco; 4 November 2009 (age 17) Neiva, Huila, Colombia

USF2000 Championship career
- Debut season: 2025
- Current team: DEForce Racing
- Car number: 12
- Starts: 36
- Wins: 4
- Podiums: 12
- Poles: 4
- Fastest laps: 5
- Best finish: 1st in 2026

Championship titles
- 2026 2024: USF2000 Championship; Lucas Oil Formula Car Race Series

Sebastián "Tatán" Garzón Orozco (born 4 November 2009) is a Colombian racing driver who last competed for DEForce Racing in the USF2000 Championship.

== Career ==
=== Karting (2015–present) ===
Garzón began racing karts competitively in 2015. On his debut year, Garzón won the Easykart World Championship, before taking two X30 Micro titles in Colombia in 2016, earning him his debut in the end-of-year SKUSA SuperNationals. Garzón then won two Panamerican Vortex Rok Cup titles in 2018 and 2019, before winning Rok the Rio in Mini Rok the following year. In 2021, Garzón won the Mini Rok and Easykart Junior national titles, awarding him an invitation to the Rok Cup Superfinal, in a season in which he also won the Autumn Trophy in Italy.

Moving up to junior karts in 2022, Garzón won the South American and Colombian junior max titles to secure an invitation to the RMC Grand Finals, before representing Colombia in the Karting Academy Trophy the following season. In 2024, Garzón began the year by securing the SKUSA Winter Series title in KA 100 Junior, before winning the end-of-year SKUSA SuperNationals in both KA 100 and X30 Junior. Alongside his growing single-seater commitments, Garzón opted to keep a constant presence in the American karting scene, mainly competing in the SKUSA Winter Series and Florida Winter Tour.

=== Transition to single-seaters and USF2000 title (2024–present) ===
In 2024, Garzón made his single-seater debut in the Lucas Oil Formula Car Race Series, clinching the title with nine wins to his name. Alongside his karting commitments with Orsolon Racing Team, Garzón signed with DEForce Racing in 2025 to compete in the USF2000 Championship. For most of the season, Garzón's best result was a fourth at St. Petersburg, until a surprise podium at the Portland elevated him to eighth in the final standings.

In 2026, Garzón remained with DEForce Racing for his second season in the USF2000 Championship, as a new athlete for Team Bogotá. Starting off the season with a double win at the St. Petersburg opener, Garzón then won race two at Indianapolis and finished on the podium in the other two races to extend his points lead. A third-place finish at Indianapolis Raceway Park then ensued, before scoring two podiums between the Road America and Mid-Ohio rounds to maintain his points lead with three rounds to go. Garzón followed it up with a podium in each remaining round, as well as a win at Markham, to clinch the USF2000 title.

== Karting record ==
=== Karting career summary ===
Season	Series	Team	Position
2016	SKUSA SuperNationals – Micro Swift		19th
2017	Rotax Max Challenge Colombia – Junior Max		6th
2019	Rok the Rio – Mini Rok		4th
2019	Biloxi Rok Fest – Mini Rok		22nd
2019	Rok Cup Superfinal – Mini Rok		18th
2019	SKUSA SuperNationals – Mini Swift		42nd
2020	Florida Winter Tour – Mini Rok		30th
2020	SKUSA Winter Series – Mini Swift		17th
2022	WSK Super Master Series – OK-J	CRG Racing Team	83rd
2022	Champions of the Future Winter Series – OK-J	CRG Racing Team	35th
2022	Karting European Championship – OK-J	CRG Racing Team	96th
2022	WSK Euro Series – OK-J	CRG Racing Team	50th
2022	Italian Karting Championship – OK-J	CRG Racing Team	20th
2022	Karting World Championship – OK-J	CRG Racing Team	55th
2022	RMC Grand Finals – Junior Max		45th
2023	Karting Academy Trophy	Andrea Orozco	14th
2023	USPKS – KA 100 Junior	Orsolon Racing	14th
2023	Rok Vegas – Junior Rok	Orsolon Racing	10th
2023	SKUSA SuperNationals – KA 100 Junior	Orsolon Racing	2nd
2024	SKUSA SuperNationals – X30 Junior	Orsolon Racing	1st
2024	SKUSA SuperNationals – KA 100 Junior	Orsolon Racing	1st
2025	SKUSA SuperNationals – KA 100 Senior	Orsolon Racing	6th
2026	SKUSA Winter Series – KA 100 Senior	Orsolon Racing	4th

== Racing record ==
=== Racing career summary ===
Season	Series	Team	Races	Wins	Poles	F/Laps	Podiums	Points	Position
2024	Lucas Oil Formula Car Race Series		15	9	5	?	13	470	**1st**
2025	USF2000 Championship	DEForce Racing	18	0	0	1	1	217	8th
2026	USF2000 Championship	DEForce Racing	18	4	4	4	11	383	**1st**

=== American open wheel racing ===
==== USF2000 Championship ====
(key) (Races in bold indicate pole position) (Races in italics indicate fastest lap) (Races with * indicate most race laps led)

Year	Team	1	2	3	4	5	6	7	8	9	10	11	12	13	14	15	16	17	18	Rank	Points
2025	DEForce Racing	STP; 1; 11	STP; 2; 4	NOL; 1; 14	NOL; 2; 6	NOL; 3; 8	IMS; 1; 7	IMS; 2; 17	IRP; 8	ROA; 1; 20	ROA; 2; 9	MOH; 1; 12	MOH; 2; 13	MOH; 3; 7	TOR; 1; 17	TOR; 2; 13	POR; 1; 5	POR; 2; 4	POR; 3; 3	8th	217
2026	DEForce Racing	**STP**; **1**; 1*	STP; 2; 1*	IMS; 1; 2	IMS; 2; 1*	IMS; 3; 3	IRP; 3	ROA1; 1; 5	ROA1; 2; 4	**ROA1**; **3**; 3	MOH; 1; 12	MOH; 2; 3	POR; 1; 14	POR; 2; 2	**MAR**; **1**; 1*	**MAR**; **2**; 15	ROA2; 1; 17	ROA2; 2; 3	ROA2; 3; 4	1st	383
