= Kaylee Countryman =

American racing driver (born 2010)

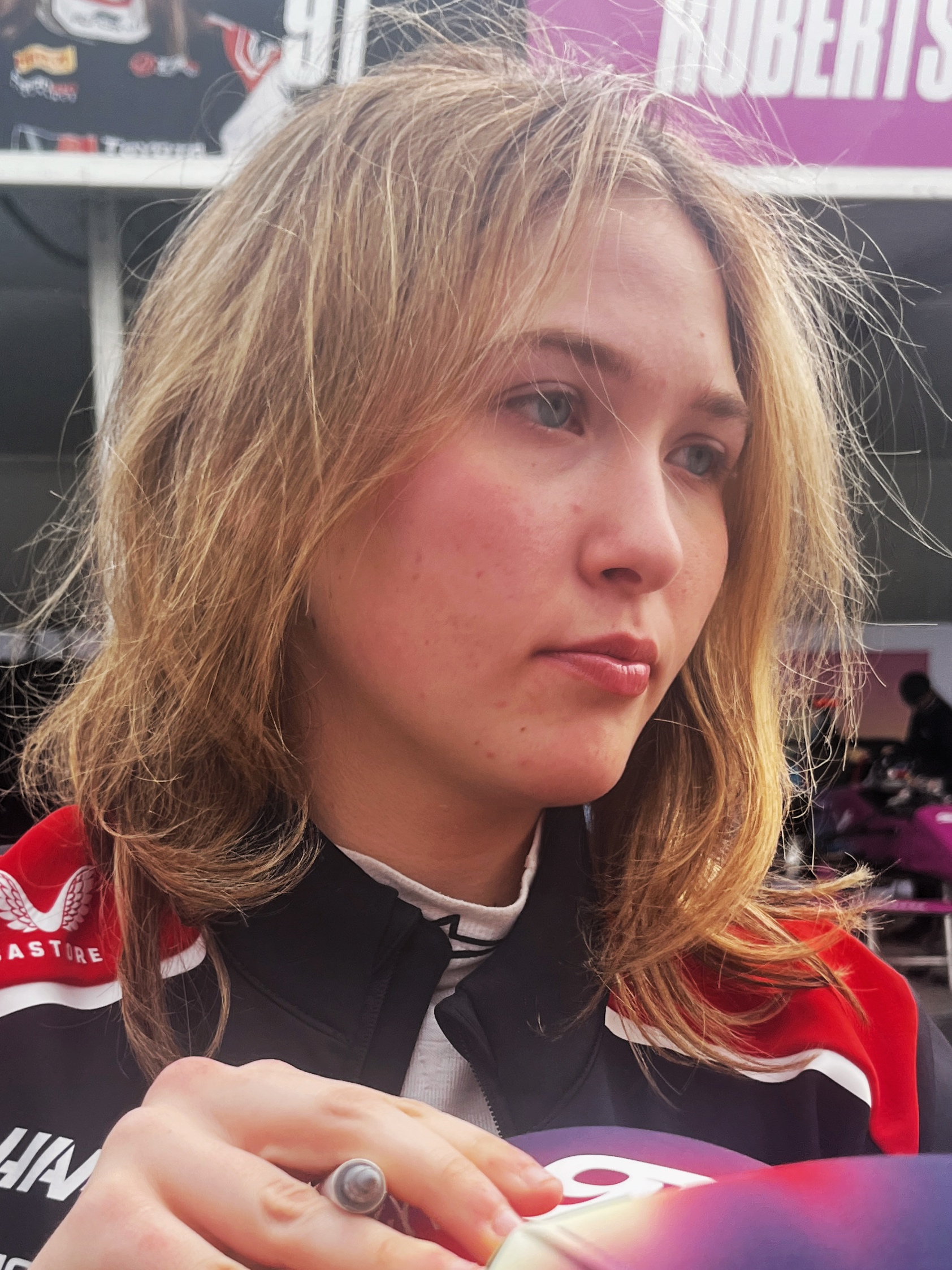
- Countryman at the 2026 Chinese Grand Prix
- Nationality: (United States) American
- Born: January 3, 2010 (age 16) Chandler, Arizona, USA

F1 Academy career
- Debut season: 2026
- Current team: ART Grand Prix
- Car number: 91
- Starts: 12
- Wins: 0
- Podiums: 1
- Poles: 0
- Fastest laps: 0
- Best finish: TBD in 2026

Previous series
- 2025; 2025; 2025; 2025; 2024: Formula Trophy; Atlantic Championship; USF Juniors; YACademy Winter Series; Lucas Oil Formula Car Race Series
- Statistics up to date as of 13 November 2026.

Kaylee Countryman (born January 3, 2010) is an American racing driver who competes in F1 Academy for ART Grand Prix and the USF2000 Championship for JHDD powered by ECR.

== Career ==
=== Karting and first year in single-seaters (2022–2025) ===
Countryman began karting in 2022, competing until 2024. Also in 2024, Countryman made her debut in single-seaters by racing in the Lucas Oil Formula Car Race Series, before testing USF Juniors machinery at the end of the year in the Chris Griffis Memorial Test.

The following year, Countryman joined Exclusive Autosport to make her full-time debut in USF Juniors. Following a difficult opening two rounds of the season, Countryman took her first top-ten at Mid-Ohio in June, before bettering her season-best result by finishing eighth a month later at the same venue. Later that same month in Road America, Countryman took her third top 10 finish in race one, before ending the season with her fourth and final top-ten finish in Portland en route to a 16th-place points finish. After her rookie season in USF Juniors, Countryman partook in F1 Academy's two-day in-season test at Navarra, replacing Courtney Crone, who was absent due to prior commitments.

During 2025, Countryman also raced with the team in the YACademy Winter Series and select rounds of the Atlantic Championship in USF Juniors machinery, in which she most notably scored wins at Mid-Ohio and Road America in the latter to secure third in points. Countryman also made select appearances in the USF2000 Championship for Exclusive Autosport, before partaking in the UAE-based Formula Trophy with Pinnacle Motorsport at the end of the year.

=== F1 Academy and USF2000 rookie campaigns (2026) ===
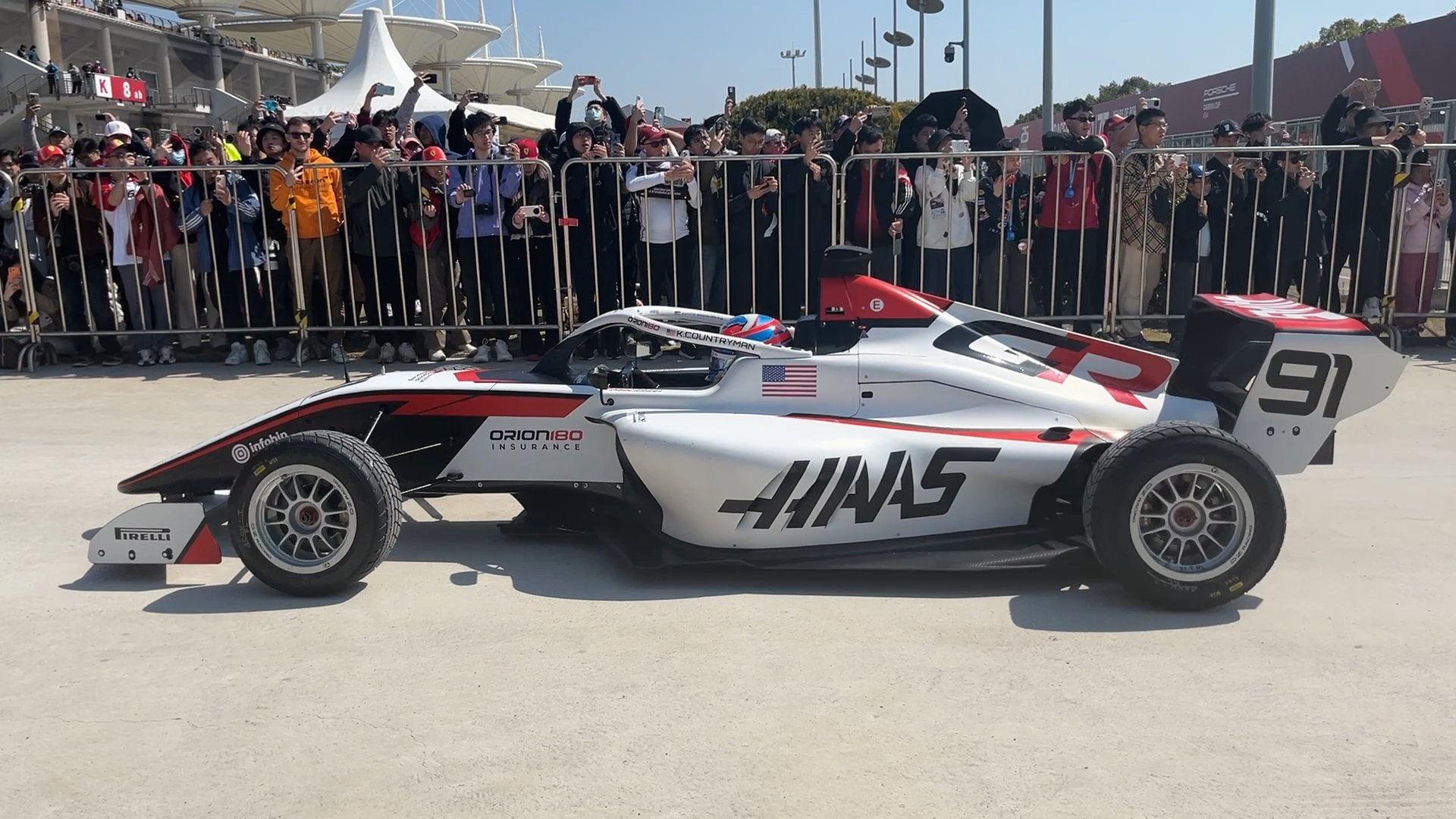
Countryman driving at the 2026 F1 Academy Shanghai round

At the start of 2026, Countryman returned to Pinnacle Motorsport to race in the first three rounds of the UAE4 Series. Following that, she partnered up with ART Grand Prix for her rookie season in F1 Academy, as took over the Haas F1 Team-sponsored entry from Crone. After a difficult season-opening Shanghai round, Countryman bounced back in the following round at Montreal, finishing seventh in race one and scoring her maiden podium by finishing second in the reverse-grid race two.

Alongside her rookie campaign in F1 Academy, Countryman remained with Exclusive Autosport for her first full campaign in USF2000. After switching to JHDD powered by ECR from round two onwards, Countryman scored her maiden top 10 in the series, finishing a season-best ninth on her debut with the team at Indianapolis.

== Karting record ==
=== Karting career summary ===
Season	Series	Team	Position
2023	SKUSA SuperNationals – KA 100 Jr.		58th
2023	Rotax US Trophy Final – Junior Max		24th
2024	Rotax Winter Cup – Rotax Junior	J3 Competition	27th

== Racing record ==
=== Racing career summary ===
Season	Series	Team	Races	Wins	Poles	F/Laps	Podiums	Points	Position
2024	Lucas Oil Formula Car Race Series		9	0	0	0	0	184	12th
2025	YACademy Winter Series	Exclusive Autosport	6	0	0	0	0	0	NC
2025	USF Juniors	Exclusive Autosport	16	0	0	0	0	89	16th
2025	USF2000 Championship	Exclusive Autosport	4	0	0	0	0	25	25th
2025	Atlantic Championship – USF Juniors	Exclusive Autosport	6	2	0	1	6	250	**3rd**
2025	Formula Trophy	Pinnacle Motorsport	4	0	0	0	0	0	29th
2026	UAE4 Series	Pinnacle Motorsport	9	0	0	0	0	0	45th
2026	USF2000 Championship	Exclusive Autosport	2	0	0	0	0	72	20th
2026	USF2000 Championship	JHDD powered by ECR	10	0	0	0	0	72	20th
2026	F1 Academy	ART Grand Prix	14	0	0	0	1	14	15th

=== American open-wheel racing results ===
==== USF Juniors ====
(key) (Races in bold indicate pole position) (Races in italics indicate fastest lap) (Races with * indicate most race laps led)

Year	Team	1	2	3	4	5	6	7	8	9	10	11	12	13	14	15	16	Rank	Points
2025	Exclusive Autosport	NOL; 1; 16	NOL; 2; 19	NOL; 3; 13	ALA; 1; 18	ALA; 2; 21	ALA; 3; 19	MOH1; 1; 20	MOH1; 2; 10	MOH2; 1; 17	MOH2; 2; 8	ROA; 1; 10	ROA; 2; 20	ROA; 3; 12	POR; 1; 16	POR; 2; 19	POR; 3; 10	16th	89

==== USF2000 Championship ====
(key) (Races in bold indicate pole position) (Races in italics indicate fastest lap) (Races with * indicate most race laps led)

Year	Team	1	2	3	4	5	6	7	8	9	10	11	12	13	14	15	16	17	18	Rank	Points
2025	Exclusive Autosport	STP; 1	STP; 2	NOL; 1	NOL; 2	NOL; 3	IMS; 1	IMS; 2	IRP	ROA; 1; 15	ROA; 2; 19	MOH; 1	MOH; 2	MOH; 3	TOR; 1; 11	TOR; 2; 14	POR; 1	POR; 2	POR; 3	25th	25
2026	Exclusive Autosport	STP; 1; 18	STP; 2; 20																	20th	72
2026	JHDD powered by ECR			IMS; 1; 9	IMS; 2; 18	IMS; 3; 13	IRP	ROA1; 1; 17	ROA1; 2; 19	ROA1; 3; 14	MOH; 1	MOH; 2	POR; 1; 10	POR; 2; 10	MAR; 1; 13	MAR; 2; 19	ROA2; 1	ROA2; 2	ROA2; 3	20th	72

=== Complete Formula Trophy results ===
(key) (Races in bold indicate pole position; races in italics indicate fastest lap)

Year	Team	1	2	3	4	5	6	7	DC	Points
2025	Pinnacle Motorsport	DUB; 1	DUB; 2	DUB; 3	YMC1; 1; 23	YMC1; 2; 24	YMC2; 1; 17	YMC2; 2; 21	29th	0

=== Complete UAE4 Series results ===
(key) (Races in bold indicate pole position; races in italics indicate fastest lap)

Year	Team	1	2	3	4	5	6	7	8	9	10	11	12	DC	Points
2026	Pinnacle Motorsport	YMC1; 1; 34	YMC1; 2; 33†	YMC1; 3; 32	YMC2; 1; 28	YMC2; 2; 33	YMC2; 3; 34	DUB; 1; 32	DUB; 2; 35	DUB; 3; 30	LUS; 1	LUS; 2	LUS; 3	45th	0

=== Complete F1 Academy results ===
(key) (Races in bold indicate pole position) (Races in italics indicate fastest lap)

Year	Entrant	1	2	3	4	5	6	7	8	9	10	11	12	13	14	DC	Points
2026	ART Grand Prix	SHA; 1; 16	SHA; 2; 13	MTL; 1; 7	MTL; 2; 2	MTL; 3; 16	SIL; 1; 17	SIL; 2; 16	ZAN; 1; 9	ZAN; 2; 16	COA; 1; 12	COA; 2; 10	COA; 3; 14	LVG; 1	LVG; 2	11th*	14*

* Season still in progress
