= Leonardo Escorpioni =

Brazilian racing driver (born 2010)

- Nationality: (Brazil) Brazilian
- Born: 14 January 2010 (age 16) Birigui, São Paulo, Brazil

USF Pro 2000 Championship career
- Debut season: 2026
- Current team: Turn 3 Motorsport
- Car number: 4
- Starts: 16
- Wins: 5
- Podiums: 9
- Poles: 5
- Fastest laps: 6
- Best finish: 2nd in 2026

Previous series
- 2026 2026 2024–2025 2024–2025 2024: USF Pro 2000; USF2000; USF Juniors; Yacademy Winter Series; Ligier JS F4 Series

Championship titles
- 2025: USF Juniors

Leonardo Escorpioni (born 14 January 2010) is a Brazilian racing driver who is set to compete in the Indy NXT with HMD Motorsports.

Escorpioni won the 2025 USF Juniors and came runner-up to the USF Pro 2000 Championship a year later.

== Career ==
=== Karting ===
He began racing at two years old and in 2018 he moved from Brazil to Orlando, Florida in the United States and came third in the Mini ROK class of the Orlando Cup in 2019. In 2022, he competed in the SKUSA SuperNationals XXV, coming runner-up in the KA100 Jr category.

=== USF Juniors ===
==== 2024 ====
With his longtime karting team Zanella Racing, he first made his car racing debut in the YACademy Winter Series, winning at the Sebring International Raceway and ending the series in fourth. His main campaign for the year was the 2024 USF Juniors, getting one podium at Virginia International Raceway and one pole position at Portland International Raceway, he ended the championship in ninth. With Champagne Racing, he did a one-off cameo in the Ligier JS F4 Series, achieving two podiums in the first and second race.

==== 2025 ====
Escorpioni started the year by winning the 2025 YACademy Series. He returned to USF Juniors in 2025 with Zanella Racing and got his first podium in the first race of the opening round at NOLA Motorsports Park and a maiden win in the second race. At Barber Motorsports Park, he started on pole position in every race, winning the first two and coming third in the final race.

In the only back-to-back rounds of the season at Mid-Ohio Sports Car Course, he achieved a double podium in the first round and a win in the second round along with another podium. The penultimate round of the series was held at Road America, where he added two more podiums to his tally.

Escorpioni started every race in the final round at Portland International Raceway one pole position, converting the first two into wins and coming second in the final race. He won the championship with six wins, six pole positions, fourteen podiums and 403 points.

=== USF2000 Championship/USF Pro 2000 Championship ===
He stepped up to the USF2000 Championship for the 2026 season with Zanella Racing. After the opening round at St. Petersburg where he took a double podium on debut, he jumped up to the USF Pro 2000 Championship with Turn 3 Motorsport for the rest of 2026 and won on debut at Arlington Street Circuit. Escorpioni took the lead of the championship at Mid-Ohio Sports Car Course, where he won all three races. He took his fifth win of the season in the following round at Portland.

He could not enter the Canadian circuit of Markham for the next round which was a crucial blow to the championship as he lost out on his title lead to Jack Jeffers, who dominated the final round at Road America, making Escorpioni fall short of the title.

=== Indy NXT ===
Escorpioni is set to be promoted to Indy NXT in 2027 with HMD Motorsports.

== Personal life ==
Based in Windermere, Florida, he is a HMD Motorsports junior driver.

== Karting record ==
=== Karting career summary ===
Season	Series	Team	Position
2019	ROK the Rio - Mini ROK	U-Race	13th
2019	Orlando Cup - Mini ROK		3rd
2020	Florida Winter Tour - Mini ROK	U-race	8th
2021	SKUSA SuperNationals XXIV - X30 Junior	Zanella Racing	29th
2022	SKUSA SuperNationals XXV - X30 Junior	Zanella Racing	40th
2022	SKUSA SuperNationals XXV - KA100 Jr.	Zanella Racing	2nd
2023	SKUSA Winter Series - KA100 Jr.	Zannella Racing	3rd
2023	Florida Winter Tour - Vrl Junior Rok	Zannella Racing	2nd
2023	SKUSA SuperNationals XXVI - KA100 Sr.	Zannella Racing	24th

== Racing record ==
=== Racing career summary ===
Season	Series	Team	Races	Win	Poles	F/Laps	Podiums	Points	Position
2024	Yacademy Winter Series	Zanella Racing	6	1	0	0	1	110	5th
2024	USF Juniors	Zanella Racing	16	0	1	1	1	146	9th
2024	Ligier JS F4 Series	Champagne Racing	3	0	0	0	2	38	11th
2025	Yacademy Winter Series	Zanella Racing	6	1	0	0	4	151	**1st**
2025	USF Juniors	Zanella Racing	16	6	6	5	14	403	**1st**
2026	USF2000 Championship	Zanella Racing	2	0	0	1	2	45	23rd
2026	USF Pro 2000 Championship	Turn 3 Motorsport	16	5	5	6	9	381	**2nd**
2027	Indy NXT	HMD / ENVE Motorsports	0	0	0	0	0	0	TBD

* Season still in progress.

=== American open-wheel racing results ===
==== USF Juniors ====
(key) (Races in bold indicate pole position) (Races in italics indicate fastest lap) (Races with * indicate most race laps led)

Year	Team	1	2	3	4	5	6	7	8	9	10	11	12	13	14	15	16	Rank	Points
2024	Zanella Racing	NOL; 1; 8	NOL; 2; 14	NOL; 3; 4	ALA; 1; 20	ALA; 2; 23	VIR; 1; 19	VIR; 2; 2	VIR; 3; 22	MOH; 1; 18	MOH; 2; 10	ROA; 1; 5	ROA; 2; 5	ROA; 3; 6	POR; 1; 21	POR; 2; 18	**POR**; **3**; 7	9th	146
2025	Zanella Racing	NOL; 1; 3	NOL; 2; 1*	NOL; 3; 20	**ALA**; **1**; 1*	**ALA**; **2**; 1*	**ALA**; **3**; 3*	MOH1; 1; 3	MOH1; 2; 3	MOH2; 1; 1*	MOH2; 2; 3	ROA; 1; 4	ROA; 2; 2	ROA; 3; 2	**POR**; **1**; 1*	**POR**; **2**; 1*	**POR**; **3**; 2*	1st	403

==== USF2000 Championship ====
(key) (Races in bold indicate pole position) (Races in italics indicate fastest lap) (Races with * indicate most race laps led)

Year	Team	1	2	3	4	5	6	7	8	9	10	11	12	13	14	15	16	17	18	Rank	Points
2026	Zanella Racing	STP; 1; 3	STP; 2; 3	IMS; 1	IMS; 2	IMS; 3	IRP	ROA1; 1	ROA1; 2	ROA1; 3	MOH; 1	MOH; 2	POR; 1	POR; 2	MAR; 1	MAR; 2	ROA2; 1	ROA2; 2	ROA2; 3	21st*	45*

==== USF Pro 2000 Championship ====
(key) (Races in bold indicate pole position) (Races in italics indicate fastest lap) (Races with * indicate most race laps led)

Year	Team	1	2	3	4	5	6	7	8	9	10	11	12	13	14	15	16	17	18	Rank	Points
2026	Turn 3 Motorsport	ARL; 1; 1	ARL; 2; 8	IMS; 1; 12	IMS; 2; 16	**IRP**; 2	ROA; 1; 5	ROA; 2; 5	**MOH**; **1**; 1*	**MOH**; **2**; 1*	MOH; 3; 1*	**POR**; **1**; 8	**POR**; **2**; 1*	MAR; 1	MAR; 2	MIL; 2	ROA; 1; 3	ROA; 2; 2	ROA; 3; 4	2nd	381

=== Complete Ligier JS F4 Series results ===
(key) (Races in bold indicate pole position; races in italics indicate fastest lap)

Year	Team	1	2	3	4	5	6	7	8	9	10	11	12	13	14	15	DC	Points
2024	Champagne Racing	NOL; 1	NOL; 2	NOL; 3	ROA; 1	ROA; 2	ROA; 3	MOH; 1	MOH; 2	MOH; 3	NJM; 1	NJM; 2	NJM; 3	COA; 1; 2	COA; 2; 2	COA; 3; 9	11th	38
