= 2025 Atlantic Championship =

Motorsport racing series

2025 Atlantic Championship Series season

Season
- Races: 14
- Start date: March 20
- End date: August 17

Awards
- 016 Class Champion Open Class Champion USF Juniors Class Champion: John McAleer; Brandon Schwarz; Justin DiLucia

The 2025 Atlantic Championship Series season was the twelfth season of the revived Atlantic Championship. The series is organized by Formula Race Promotions and sanctioned by SCCA Pro Racing.

The season was held over seven weekends from March to August 2025. The Open Class and USF Juniors Class titles were decided with two weekends to spare, with Havoc Motorsport's Brandon Schwarz winning the former and Exclusive Autosport's Justin DiLucia claiming the latter. The 016 Class championship remained open until the final race weekend, where MotoNomaddicts' John McAleer took the title.

== Drivers and teams ==
Drivers competed in three classes: the 016 Class was only open to Swift 016a cars, while the USF Juniors Class was open to Tatuus PM-18 cars and the Open Class served all other eligible entries.

Team	No.	Driver	Car	Rounds
016 Class entries
K-Hill Motorsports	24	(United States) Matthew Butson	2006 Swift 016 Mazda	5
K-Hill Motorsports	32	(United States) Kirk Kindsfater	2006 Swift 016a	4
K-Hill Motorsports	74	(United States) Dudley Fleck	2006 Swift 016 Mazda	4
K-Hill Motorsports	777	(Estonia) Tõnis Kasemets	2006 Swift 016a	2
K-Hill Motorsports	06	(United States) Bruce Hamilton	2001 Swift 014 MZR	6
Lights Out Racing	63	(United States) Shane Kennett	2006 Swift 016a	1
SMT/Zober Industries Inc.	66	(United States) Richard Zober	2006 Swift 016a Mazda	1, 4–6
MotoNomaddicts	68	(United States) John McAleer	2006 Swift 016	1, 3–5, 7
Open Class entries
Jensen Global Advisors	1	(United States) Athan Sterling	2021 Ligier JS F3	2
Havoc Motorsport	7	(United States) Charles Meagher	2004 Mazda Pro Formula	4
Havoc Motorsport	12	(United States) Derek LaManna	2014 Mazda Pro Formula	4
Havoc Motorsport	14	(United States) Kamil Kopko	2004 Mazda Pro Formula	4
Havoc Motorsport	29	(United States) Rob Radman	1999 Swift 008.a Toyota	1, 4
Havoc Motorsport	46	(United States) Brandon Schwarz	2020 Ligier JS F3	1–5
Havoc Motorsport	99	(United States) Ken DeNault	1998 Formula Mazda	2–3
Hamilton Motorsports	15	(United States) Steve Hamilton	2020 JDR F1000	3–4
Alliance Racing	17	(United States) Bob Corliss	2001 Swift 014.a	1–5
DD Autosports	18	(United States) Rocco Magni	2021 Ligier JS F3	1
Slahor Racing	19	(United States) Jason Slahor	2008 Citation F1000	3, 5, 7
Synergy Motorsport	30	(Australia) Eddie Beswick	2024 Tatuus USF2000	1
Arrive Drive Motorsports	33	(United States) Charles Livingston	2012 JDR F1000	1–5
Arrive Drive Motorsports	39	(United States) Roman McCurdy	2012 JDR F1000	4
Arrive Drive Motorsports	81	(United States) Tim Pierce	2018 JDR F1000	1, 3
Arrive Drive Motorsports	89	(United States) Nathan Byrd	2012 JDR F1000	1–2, 7
Arrive Drive Motorsports	199	(United States) Paulie Gatto	2012 JDR F1000	1–5, 7
Arrive Drive Motorsports	07	(United States) Austin Holtgraewe	2012 JDR F1000	1, 3
Forty 48 Competition	71	(United States) Jeffrey Antonelli	2006 Star Pro Mazda	4
Forty 48 Competition	146	(United States) James French	2001 Swift 014/CSR	1, 4
FatBoy Racing!	83	(United States) Charles Finelli	2014 Mazda Pro Mazda	1
K-Hill Motorsports	06	(United States) Bruce Hamilton	2001 Swift 014 MZR	1, 4, 7
Team Tonis	09	(United States) J.R. Smart	2002 Swift 014.a	4
USF Juniors Class entries
Exclusive Autosport	9	(United States) Gabriel Cahan	Tatuus PM-18	1–2, 4
Exclusive Autosport	91	(United States) Kaylee Countryman	Tatuus PM-18	1–2, 4
Exclusive Autosport	92	(United States) Ayrton Cahan	Tatuus PM-18	2, 4
Exclusive Autosport	94	(Canada) Justin Di Lucia	Tatuus PM-18	1–5, 7
Pole Position Motorsports	127	(United States) Connor Aspley	Tatuus PM-18	4

== Race calendar ==
The race schedule was announced on September 30, 2024. The race count increased again, with the series adding a seventh round at Watkins Glen to bring the total to 14 races across seven rounds.

Round		Circuit	Date	Support bill	Map of circuit locations
1	R1	(Georgia (U.S. state)) Road Atlanta, Braselton	March 22	SVRA Sprint Series; Trans-Am Series	2025 Atlantic Championship is located in the United States
1	R2	(Georgia (U.S. state)) Road Atlanta, Braselton	March 23	SVRA Sprint Series; Trans-Am Series	2025 Atlantic Championship is located in the United States
2	R1	Mid-Ohio Sports Car Course, Lexington	April 26	FRP race weekend Formula Ford Challenge Series	2025 Atlantic Championship is located in the United States
2	R2	Mid-Ohio Sports Car Course, Lexington	April 27	FRP race weekend Formula Ford Challenge Series	2025 Atlantic Championship is located in the United States
3	R1	(Pennsylvania) Pittsburgh International Race Complex, Wampum	May 31	SVRA Sprint Series; Formula Vee Challenge Cup	2025 Atlantic Championship is located in the United States
3	R2	(Pennsylvania) Pittsburgh International Race Complex, Wampum	June 1	SVRA Sprint Series; Formula Vee Challenge Cup	2025 Atlantic Championship is located in the United States
4	R1	(Wisconsin) Road America, Elkhart Lake	June 28	Ultimate Street Car Association; Trans-Am Series	2025 Atlantic Championship is located in the United States
4	R2	(Wisconsin) Road America, Elkhart Lake	June 29	Ultimate Street Car Association; Trans-Am Series	2025 Atlantic Championship is located in the United States
5	R1	(New York (state)) Watkins Glen International, Watkins Glen	July 12	Trans-Am Series; Skip Barber Formula Race Series	2025 Atlantic Championship is located in the United States
5	R2	(New York (state)) Watkins Glen International, Watkins Glen	July 13	Trans-Am Series; Skip Barber Formula Race Series	2025 Atlantic Championship is located in the United States
6	R1	New Jersey Motorsports Park, Millville	August 2	Formula Regional Americas Championship; Formula 4 United States Championship	2025 Atlantic Championship is located in the United States
6	R2	New Jersey Motorsports Park, Millville	August 3	Formula Regional Americas Championship; Formula 4 United States Championship	2025 Atlantic Championship is located in the United States
7	R1	(West Virginia) Summit Point Motorsports Park, Summit Point	August 16	SVRA Sprint Series; Formula Vee Challenge Cup	2025 Atlantic Championship is located in the United States
7	R2	(West Virginia) Summit Point Motorsports Park, Summit Point	August 17	SVRA Sprint Series; Formula Vee Challenge Cup	2025 Atlantic Championship is located in the United States

== Race results ==
Round		Circuit	Pole position	016 Class		Open Class		USF Juniors Class	
Round		Circuit	Pole position	Fastest lap	Winning driver	Fastest lap	Winning driver	Fastest lap	Winning driver
1	R1	(Georgia (U.S. state)) Road Atlanta	(United States) John McAleer	(United States) John McAleer	(United States) John McAleer	(United States) James French	(United States) James French	(United States) Gabriel Cahan	(United States) Gabriel Cahan
1	R2	(Georgia (U.S. state)) Road Atlanta		(United States) John McAleer	(United States) John McAleer	(United States) Brandon Schwarz	(United States) Brandon Schwarz	(United States) Gabriel Cahan	(United States) Gabriel Cahan
2	R1	Mid-Ohio Sports Car Course	(Estonia) Tõnis Kasemets	(Estonia) Tõnis Kasemets	(Estonia) Tõnis Kasemets	(United States) Brandon Schwarz	(United States) Athan Sterling	(United States) Kaylee Countryman	(United States) Kaylee Countryman
2	R2	Mid-Ohio Sports Car Course	(Estonia) Tõnis Kasemets	(Estonia) Tõnis Kasemets	(Estonia) Tõnis Kasemets	(United States) Brandon Schwarz	(United States) Athan Sterling	(United States) Gabriel Cahan	(United States) Gabriel Cahan
3	R1	(Pennsylvania) Pittsburgh International Race Complex	(United States) John McAleer	(United States) John McAleer	(United States) John McAleer	(United States) Bob Corliss	(United States) Brandon Schwarz	(Canada) Justin Di Lucia	(Canada) Justin Di Lucia
3	R2	(Pennsylvania) Pittsburgh International Race Complex	(United States) John McAleer	(United States) John McAleer	(United States) John McAleer	(United States) Bob Corliss	(United States) Brandon Schwarz	(Canada) Justin Di Lucia	(Canada) Justin Di Lucia
4	R1	(Wisconsin) Road America	(United States) John McAleer	(United States) Dudley Fleck	(United States) Dudley Fleck	(United States) James French	(United States) Brandon Schwarz	(United States) Gabriel Cahan	(United States) Kaylee Countryman
4	R2	(Wisconsin) Road America	(United States) Dudley Fleck	(United States) Dudley Fleck	(United States) Dudley Fleck	(United States) J.R. Smart	(United States) J.R. Smart	(Canada) Justin Di Lucia	(Canada) Justin Di Lucia
5	R1	(New York (state)) Watkins Glen International	(United States) Matthew Butson	(United States) Matthew Butson	(United States) Matthew Butson	(United States) Brandon Schwarz	(United States) Brandon Schwarz	(Canada) Justin Di Lucia	(Canada) Justin Di Lucia
5	R2	(New York (state)) Watkins Glen International	(United States) Matthew Butson	(United States) John McAleer	(United States) John McAleer	(United States) Brandon Schwarz	(United States) Brandon Schwarz	(Canada) Justin Di Lucia	(Canada) Justin Di Lucia
6	R1	New Jersey Motorsports Park	(United States) Richard Zober	(United States) Richard Zober	(United States) Richard Zober	no entries			
6	R2	New Jersey Motorsports Park		(United States) Richard Zober	(United States) Richard Zober	no entries			
7	R1	(West Virginia) Summit Point Motorsports Park	(United States) John McAleer	(United States) John McAleer	(United States) John McAleer	(United States) Bruce Hamilton	(United States) Bruce Hamilton	(Canada) Justin Di Lucia	(Canada) Justin Di Lucia
7	R2	(West Virginia) Summit Point Motorsports Park		(United States) John McAleer	(United States) John McAleer	(United States) Bruce Hamilton	(United States) Bruce Hamilton	(Canada) Justin Di Lucia	(Canada) Justin Di Lucia

== Season report ==
The 2025 Atlantic Championship started at Road Atlanta, and 16 drivers entered the event. Competition in the 016 Class was clear-cut: MotoNomaddicts' John McAleer set pole position in qualifying and dominated both races. Arrive Drive Motorsport’s 2024 class champion Nathan Byrd took pole position in the Open Class, but could only manage third and second in the races, with Forty 48 Competition’s James French winning race one and Havoc Motorsport’s Brandon Schwarz victorious in race two. Previously a two-class series, the 2025 season saw the introduction of a separate class for entries from the USF Juniors Championship. Exclusive Autosport’s Gabriel Cahan won both races in that class.

Twelve entrants traveled to Mid-Ohio for round two. K-Hill Motorsports’ Tõnis Kasemets was the only 016 Class entrant and thereby swept the weekend. The Open Class saw Jensen’s Athan Sterling closely battle Schwarz for both race wins, with the former coming out on top both times and Arrive Drive Motorsports’ Paulie Gatto and Havoc Motorsport’s Ken DeNault completing the class podiums. After the weekend concluded, Sterling was disqualified from all sessions for using non-declared tires, so Schwarz inherited both race wins. Four cars entered the USF Juniors Class, and the two races were won by the Exclusive Autosport pair of Kaylee Countryman and Justin Di Lucia.

Round three was held at Pittsburgh, and this time the sole 016 Class competitor was McAleer, who was therefore able to extend his championship lead. Eight cars entered the Open Class, where Alliance Racing’s Bob Corliss claimed two pole positions but was unable to convert both. Instead, points leader Schwarz notched up two more victories, rising from sixth on the grid in race one and beating Corliss off the front row in the second race. Arrive Drive Motorsports’ Tim Pierce took two second places, with Corliss coming third in race one before dropping to seventh in race two. Di Lucia was the only USF Juniors Class entrant and took two wins and with it the points lead in the class.

23 drivers entered the event at Road America, a high point not seen in years. In the 016 Class, K-Hill’s Dudley Fleck entered his only weekend of the season and swept the weekend, while points leader McAleer took two second places, further cementing his championship advantage. Fourteen drivers entered the Open Class, but Schwartz was once again the class of the field in the first race. Series debutant J.R. Smart won the second race driving for Team Tonis, with Gatto and K-Hill’s Bruce Hamilton also featuring on the podium across the weekend. In the USF Juniors Class, Countryman and Di Lucia each notched up another win, with Countryman now third in class behind Gabriel Cahan.

Entry numbers were back down to single digits upon the series’ return to Watkins Glen. 2024 016 Class champion Matthew Butson returned to competition for K-Hill and was back in front right away, taking two pole positions and winning the first race. He suffered a mechanical failure in race two, leaving McAleer to take his fifth win and further cement his championship advantage. Schwartz took two further victories in the Open Class, both times leading Arrive Drive Motorsports’ Charles Livingston and Gatto and thereby claiming the class title with four races to spare. With Di Lucia once again the only USF Juniors Class competitor, that title was also sealed early in Watkins Glen.

The entry record from Road America was followed by a low point two rounds later, as only two cars entered the weekend at New Jersey Motorsports Park, and both were in the 016 Class. SMT/Zober Industries’ Richard Zober was joined by Bruce Hamilton, who had spent the year so far competing in the Open Class and had switched cars for this round. With Hamilton not used to the Swift 016 car, Zober was able to set pole position in the weekend’s only qualifying session, before winning both races comfortably and taking two fastest laps. This saw him close up to points leader McAleer and secure his runner-up spot in the class with two races yet to run.

The 016 Class entry list for the finale at Summit Point again featured only McAleer, who swept the weekend and clinched the class title with a lead of over 100 points. He was unable to finish the second race, but as he had covered more than half of the race distance, he was still awarded points. With the Open Class title already sealed and champion Schwarz absent, Livingston and Gatto continued fighting for the runner-up spot. Bruce Hamilton won both races, but with Livingston second twice, he beat Gatto to second in the standings by a single point. USF Juniors class champion Di Lucia was once again the only entrant in his class, so he claimed both races to bring his season total to eight wins.

== Standings ==
=== Scoring system ===
Three points were awarded for pole position in each class, as well as two more points for the fastest lap per race per class.

Position	1st	2nd	3rd	4th	5th	6th	7th	8th	9th	10th	11th	12th	13th	14th	15th	16th	17th	18th	19th	20th	21st	22nd	23rd	24th	25th+
Points	50	42	37	34	31	29	27	25	23	21	19	17	15	13	11	10	9	8	7	6	5	4	3	2	1

Each driver's two worst results were dropped. Rounds with no entries in class did not count towards these two results.

=== Drivers' standings ===
Pos	Driver	(Georgia (U.S. state)) ATL		(Ohio) MOH		(Pennsylvania) PIT		(Wisconsin) ROA		(New York (state)) WGL		(New Jersey) NJM		(West Virginia) SUM		Pen.	Pts
Pos	Driver	R1	R2	R1	R2	R1	R2	R1	R2	R1	R2	R1	R2	R1	R2	Pen.	Pts
016 Class standings
1	(United States) John McAleer	**1**	1			**1**	**1**	**2**	2	2	1			**1**	1		505
2	(United States) Richard Zober	2	3					Ret	4	3	2	**1**	1				300
3	(Estonia) Tõnis Kasemets			**1**	**1**												110
4	(United States) Dudley Fleck							1	**1**								107
5	(United States) Bruce Hamilton											2	2				84
6	(United States) Shane Kennett	3	2														79
7	(United States) Kirk Kindsfater							3	3								74
8	(United States) Matthew Butson									**1**	**Ret**						59
Open Class standings
1	(United States) Brandon Schwarz	2	1	**1**	1	1	1	1	2	**1**	**1**						503
2	(United States) Charles Livingston	5	7	3	4	(Ret)	4	(DNS)	5	2	2			2	2		362
3	(United States) Paulie Gatto	(7)	6	2	3	5	3	(Ret)	3	3	3			3	3		361
6	(United States) Bruce Hamilton	4	4					3	12					**1**	1		229
4	(United States) Bob Corliss	10	Ret	Ret	DNS	**3**	**7**	4	7	4	4						226
5	(United States) Tim Pierce	6	5			2	2										144
7	(United States) James French	1	3					**11**	DNS								113
8	(United States) Austin Holtgraewe	9	8			7	6										104
9	(United States) Ken DeNault			4	2	8	DNS										101
10	(United States) Steve Hamilton					6	5	7*	6							15	101
11	(United States) J.R. Smart							2	**1**								97
12	(United States) Nathan Byrd	**3**	2	Ret	**Ret**									DNS	DNS		87
13	(United States) Roman McCurdy							6	4								63
14	(United States) Jeffrey Antonelli							5	8								56
15	(United States) Kamil Kopko							8	9								48
16	(United States) Rob Radman	8	11					DNS	DNS								44
17	(United States) Derek LaManna							9	10								44
=18	(Australia) Eddie Beswick	11	10														40
=18	(United States) Charles Meagher							10	11								40
20	(United States) Jason Slahor					4	DNS			WD	WD			DNS	DNS		34
21	(United States) Rocco Magni	Ret	9														24
—	(United States) Athan Sterling			DSQ	DSQ												0
—	(United States) Charles Finelli	DNS	DNS														0
USF Juniors Class standings
1	(Canada) Justin Di Lucia	2	2	(3)	**1**	**1**	**1**	(4)	**1**	**1**	**1**			**1**	1		519
2	(United States) Gabriel Cahan	**1**	1	**2**	2			**5**	2								274
3	(United States) Kaylee Countryman	3	3	1	3			1	3								250
4	(United States) Ayrton Cahan			4	4			2	5								141
5	(United States) Connor Aspley							3	4								71
Pos	Driver	R1	R2	R1	R2	R1	R2	R1	R2	R1	R2	R1	R2	R1	R2		Pts
Pos	Driver	(Georgia (U.S. state)) ATL		(Ohio) MOH		(Pennsylvania) PIT		(Wisconsin) ROA		(New York (state)) WGL		(New Jersey) NJM		(West Virginia) SUM		Pen.	Pts

Colour	Result
Gold	Winner
Silver	Second place
Bronze	Third place
Green	Points classification
Blue	Non-points classification
Blue	Non-classified finish (NC)
Purple	Retired, not classified (Ret)
Red	Did not qualify (DNQ)
Red	Did not pre-qualify (DNPQ)
Black	Disqualified (DSQ)
White	Did not start (DNS)
White	Withdrew (WD)
White	Race cancelled (C)
Blank	Did not practice (DNP)
Blank	Did not arrive (DNA)
Blank	Excluded (EX)

**Bold** – Pole

Italics – Fastest Lap

* – Penalty

== See also ==
- 2025 F2000 Championship Series
- 2025 F1600 Championship Series
