= Liam Loiacono =

Australian racing driver (born 2008)

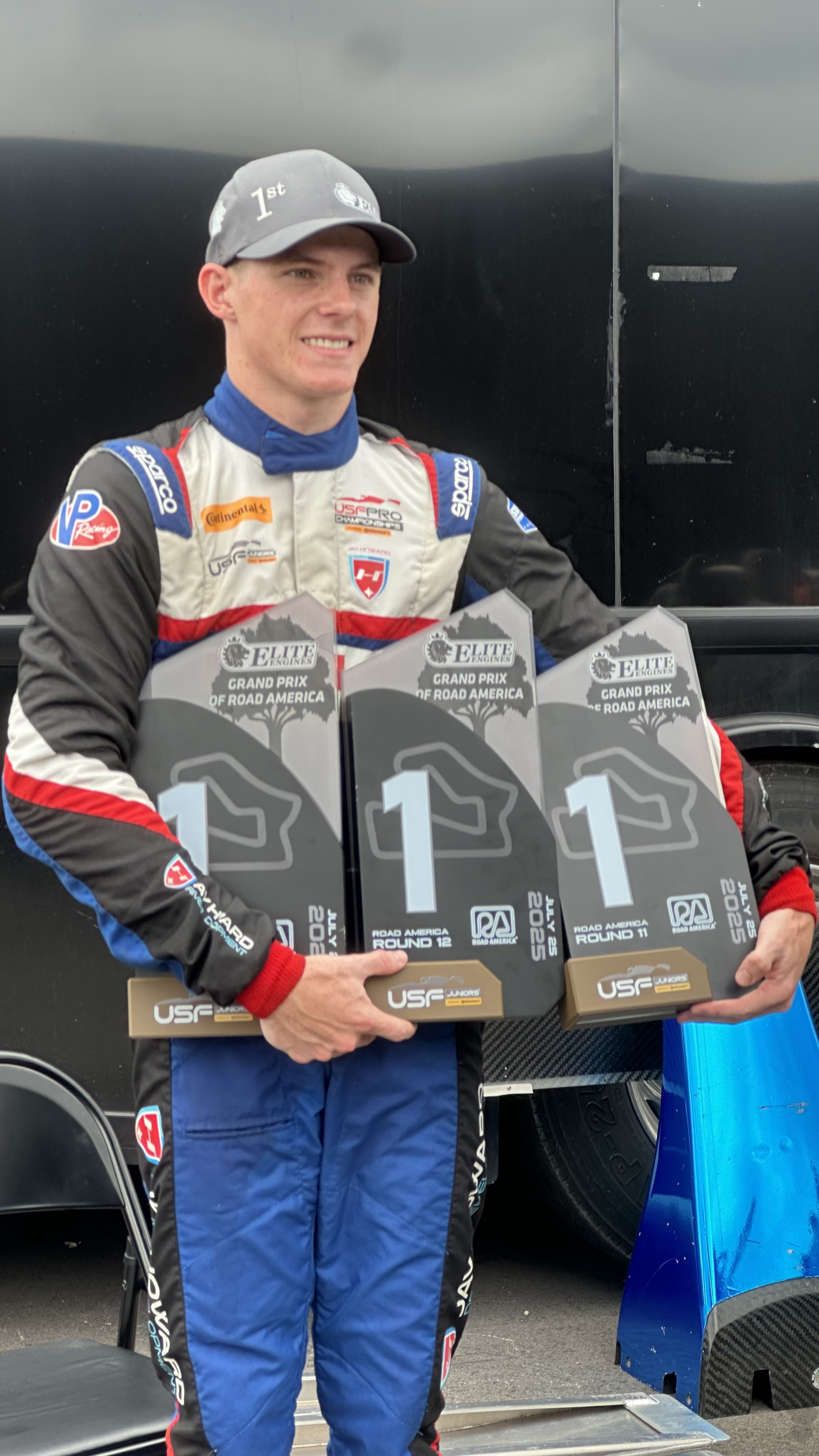
- Loiacono in 2025.
- Born: 12 February 2008 (age 18); Macmasters Beach, Australia
- Nationality: (Australia) Australian

USF2000 Championship career
- Debut season: 2026
- Current team: Jay Howard Driver Development
- Car number: 6
- Starts: 11
- Wins: 0
- Podiums: 0
- Poles: 0
- Fastest laps: 1
- Best finish: 17th in 2026

Previous series
- 2025: USF Juniors
- Statistics up to date as of 29 September 2026.

Liam Loiacono (/ˌlɔɪ.æˈkə.noʊ/; born 12 February 2008) is an Australian racing driver who last competed in the USF2000 Championship for Jay Howard Driver Development.

== Early and personal life ==
Liam Loiacono was born on 12 February 2008 in Macmasters Beach, New South Wales, Australia. His father, Paul Loiacono is the founder and managing director of forklift dealership Forklogic, as well being an amateur race car driver. He was raised in Macmasters Beach before moving to Noosa in 2021 alongside his older brother Oliver, also a racing driver.

== Career ==
Loiacono made his single-seater debut in late 2022, racing in the Australian Formula Ford for Forklogic. After racing in two of the final three rounds, Loiacono came back to the series in 2023. He won the Queensland series after taking four wins in the season-ending round at Morgan Park Raceway. Returning to Formula Ford competition in 2024, Loiacono took his maiden Formula Ford wins at Morgan Park Raceway, before taking a further two wins at Sydney Motorsport Park, on his way to fourth in the Australian standings and winning the Duratec title in November of that year.

After testing with them at the end of 2024 and also racing for them in the final round of the YACademy Winter Series, Loiacono stayed with Jay Howard Driver Development for the 2025 USF Juniors season. After finishing sixth on debut in race one at NOLA Motorsports Park, Loiacono set a new track record to take pole for race two, but lost the lead at the start and ultimately finished second. Following the round at Barber where he finished no higher than sixth, Loiacono set the lap record in race one at Mid-Ohio to finish fifth in race one, before taking his maiden series win in race two after passing João Vergara at the start. In the series' second trip to Mid-Ohio, Loiacono finished fourth in race one, before inheriting the win in race two following Ty Fisher's post-race disqualification. After winning all three races at Road America, Loiacono only scored one podium in the final round at Portland as he finished runner-up in points to Leonardo Escorpioni.

The following year, Loiacono continued with JHDD as he stepped up to the USF2000 Championship. In his rookie season in the series, Loiacono took a best result of fourth at both Indianapolis and IRP as he ended the year 17th in points after missing the final three rounds on budget constraints. During 2026, Loiacono also raced at the Bathurst 6 Hour for his family team, winning the event in the A1 class alongside his brother Oliver and Alex Holzl.

== Racing record ==
=== Racing career summary ===
Season	Series	Team	Races	Wins	Poles	F/Laps	Podiums	Points	Position
2022	Formula Ford Australia	Forklogic	6	0	0	0	0	13	27th
2023	Formula Ford Australia	BF Racing	12	0	0	0	0	5	23rd
2023	Pitcher Partners Sydney 300	Heli Material Handling	1	0	0	0	0	—N/a	NC
2024	Australian Formula Ford Series – Duratec	BF Racing	20	3	2	5	9	234	4th
2024	Victorian Formula Ford Championship – Duratec	BF Racing	15	2	1	4	8	328	**3rd**
2024	NSW Formula Ford Championship – Ford Fiesta		3	2	0	0	3	86	12th
2024	Queensland Formula Ford 1600 Championship		3	1	0	0	3	52	6th
2024	Hi-Tec Oils Bathurst 6 Hour – Class A1	Forklogic	1	0	0	0	0	—N/a	DNF
2025	YACademy Winter Series	Jay Howard Driver Development	3	0	0	0	1	9	9th
2025	USF Juniors	Jay Howard Driver Development	16	5	4	5	7	332	**2nd**
2026	USF2000 Championship	Jay Howard Driver Development powered by ECR	11	0	0	1	0	111	17th
2026	Hi-Tec Oils Bathurst 6 Hour – Class A1	Loiacono / Holzl Racing	1	1	0	0	1	—N/a	**1st**

* Season still in progress.

=== American open-wheel racing results ===
==== USF Juniors ====
(key) (Races in bold indicate pole position) (Races in italics indicate fastest lap) (Races with * indicate most race laps led)

Year	Team	1	2	3	4	5	6	7	8	9	10	11	12	13	14	15	16	Rank	Points
2025	Jay Howard Driver Development	NOL; 1; 6	**NOL**; **2**; 2	NOL; 3; 6	ALA; 1; 6	ALA; 2; 7	ALA; 3; 8	MOH1; 1; 5	MOH1; 2; 1*	MOH2; 1; 4	MOH2; 2; 1	**ROA**; **1**; 1*	**ROA**; **2**; 1*	**ROA**; **3**; 1*	POR; 1; 11	POR; 2; 2	POR; 3; 20	2nd	332

==== USF2000 Championship ====
(key) (Races in bold indicate pole position) (Races in italics indicate fastest lap) (Races with * indicate most race laps led)

Year	Team	1	2	3	4	5	6	7	8	9	10	11	12	13	14	15	16	17	18	Rank	Points
2026	Jay Howard Driver Development powered by ECR	STP; 1; 11	STP; 2; 18	IMS; 1; 4	IMS; 2; 12	IMS; 3; 7	IRP; 4	ROA1; 1; 11	ROA1; 2; 24	ROA1; 3; 19	MOH; 1; 15	MOH; 2; 14	POR; 1 Wth	POR; 2 Wth	MAR; 1	MAR; 2	ROA2; 1	ROA2; 2	ROA2; 3	17th	111
