= 2025 USF Juniors =

Racing season

The 2025 USF Juniors presented by Continental Tire was the fourth season of the USF Juniors. The championship served as the fourth rung of the IndyCar Series' USF Pro Championships ladder system.

== Series news ==
- The scholarship for the champion was decreased by approximately $14,000 to $249,675.

== Drivers and teams ==
All drivers competed using Tatuus JR-23 racecars with Elite Mazda 2.0-014A engines and Continental tires.

Team	No.	Driver(s)	Status	Round(s)
(United States) DEForce Racing	14	(Finland) Vilho Aatola	R	All
(United States) DEForce Racing	15	(Mexico) Patricio González		All
(United States) DEForce Racing	16	(United States) Lincoln Day		1–6
(United States) DEForce Racing	17	(United States) Thomas Nordquist	R	All
(United States) DEForce Racing	18	(Mexico) Rodrigo González		All
(United States) Exclusive Autosport	90	(United States) Kaylee Countryman	R	All
(United States) Exclusive Autosport	92	(United States) Brenden Cooley	R	All
(United States) Exclusive Autosport	94	(Canada) Justin Di Lucia	R	14–16
(United States) International Motorsport	24	(United States) Michael Suco		All
(United States) International Motorsport	25	(United States) Hudson Potter		All
(United States) International Motorsport	26	(United States) Emma Scarbrough	R	All
(United States) Jay Howard Driver Development	4	(Belgium) Karel Staut	R	1–6
(United States) Jay Howard Driver Development	5	(United Kingdom) Harry Moss	R	1–8
(United States) Jay Howard Driver Development	5	(United Kingdom) Chase Fernandez	R	9–10
(United States) Jay Howard Driver Development	6	(Australia) Liam Loiacono	R	All
(United States) Jay Howard Driver Development	7	(United Kingdom) Harley Keeble	R	7–8
(United States) Jay Howard Driver Development	9	(United States) JT Hoskins	R	All
(United States) Pole Position Motorsports	27	(United States) Connor Aspley	R	All
(United States) VRD Racing	10	(Brazil) João Vergara		All
(United States) VRD Racing	11	(United States) Colin Aitken	R	11–16
(United States) VRD Racing	77	(Israel) Matan Achituv	R	All
(United States) VRD Racing	98	(United States) Oliver Wheldon	R	All
(United States) Zanella Racing	12	(Mexico) Diego Guiot		All
(United States) Zanella Racing	23	(United States) Rahim Alibhai	R	11–16
(United States) Zanella Racing	29	(United States) Maddie Colleran	R	All
(United States) Zanella Racing	37	(Canada) Ty Fisher	R	All
(United States) Zanella Racing	55	(Brazil) Leonardo Escorpioni		All

Icon	Status
R	Rookie

- Juan Pablo Vallarta was scheduled to compete for DEForce Racing Driver Development, but did not appear at any rounds.

=== Driver changes ===
Exclusive Autosport signed karting driver Kaylee Countryman, who made her open-wheel racing debut with the team. The team resigned Brendan Cooley for a full-season campaign after competing with them in the penultimate round of the 2024 season.

Jay Howard Driver Development signed JT Hoskins to a full-season campaign after racing with the team for the last three rounds last season. The team also signed Vilho Aatola, Karel Staut and Harry Moss, all of whom made their open-wheel racing debuts with JHDD, as well as Liam Loiacono who joined USF Juniors after competing in the Australian Formula Ford Championship.

VRD Racing added rookies Matan Achituv and Ryan Giannetta to the team. João Vergara switched to VRD Racing after finishing 8th in the previous season with Exclusive Autosport.

Zanella Racing signed Ty Fisher, who made his open-wheel racing debut with the team. The team also signed Maddie Colleran who joined the series from the Lucas Oil School of Racing.

=== Team Changes ===
Pole Position Motorsports announced they would join the series with Connor Aspley as their driver.

== Schedule ==
The 2025 schedule was revealed on September 17, 2024. The championship visited a majority of the same circuits as in 2024, with the exception of Virginia International Raceway being replaced with two more rounds at Mid-Ohio. All rounds except the weekends at NOLA, Mid-Ohio races 7–8, and Road America were run in support of the IndyCar Series.

Icon	Legend
R	Road course

Rd.	Date	Race name	Track	Location
1	April 11–13	Continental Tire Grand Prix of Louisiana	R NOLA Motorsports Park	Avondale, Louisiana
2	April 11–13	Continental Tire Grand Prix of Louisiana	R NOLA Motorsports Park	Avondale, Louisiana
3	April 11–13	Continental Tire Grand Prix of Louisiana	R NOLA Motorsports Park	Avondale, Louisiana
4	May 1–3	Children’s of Alabama Grand Prix	R Barber Motorsports Park	Birmingham, Alabama
5	May 1–3	Children’s of Alabama Grand Prix	R Barber Motorsports Park	Birmingham, Alabama
6	May 1–3	Children’s of Alabama Grand Prix	R Barber Motorsports Park	Birmingham, Alabama
7	June 6–8	PFC Grand Prix of Mid-Ohio	R Mid-Ohio Sports Car Course	Lexington, Ohio
8	June 6–8	PFC Grand Prix of Mid-Ohio	R Mid-Ohio Sports Car Course	Lexington, Ohio
9	July 3–6	PFC Grand Prix of Mid-Ohio	R Mid-Ohio Sports Car Course	Lexington, Ohio
10	July 3–6	PFC Grand Prix of Mid-Ohio	R Mid-Ohio Sports Car Course	Lexington, Ohio
11	July 24–26	Elite Engines Grand Prix of Road America	R Road America	Elkhart Lake. Wisconsin
12	July 24–26	Elite Engines Grand Prix of Road America	R Road America	Elkhart Lake. Wisconsin
13	July 24–26	Elite Engines Grand Prix of Road America	R Road America	Elkhart Lake. Wisconsin
14	August 8–9	Continental Tire Grand Prix of Portland	R Portland International Raceway	Portland, Oregon
15	August 8–9	Continental Tire Grand Prix of Portland	R Portland International Raceway	Portland, Oregon
16	August 8–9	Continental Tire Grand Prix of Portland	R Portland International Raceway	Portland, Oregon

== Race results ==
Rd.	Track	Pole position	Fastest lap	Most laps led	Race winner	
Rd.	Track	Pole position	Fastest lap	Most laps led	Driver	Team
1	NOLA Motorsports Park	(United States) Oliver Wheldon	(United States) Oliver Wheldon	(Brazil) João Vergara	(Brazil) João Vergara	VRD Racing
2	NOLA Motorsports Park	(Australia) Liam Loiacono	(Canada) Ty Fisher	(Brazil) Leonardo Escorpioni	(Brazil) Leonardo Escorpioni	Zanella Racing
3	NOLA Motorsports Park	(Canada) Ty Fisher	(Canada) Ty Fisher	(Canada) Ty Fisher	(Canada) Ty Fisher	Zanella Racing
4	Barber Motorsports Park	(Brazil) Leonardo Escorpioni	(Brazil) Leonardo Escorpioni	(Brazil) Leonardo Escorpioni	(Brazil) Leonardo Escorpioni	Zanella Racing
5	Barber Motorsports Park	(Brazil) Leonardo Escorpioni	(Brazil) Leonardo Escorpioni	(Brazil) Leonardo Escorpioni	(Brazil) Leonardo Escorpioni	Zanella Racing
6	Barber Motorsports Park	(Brazil) Leonardo Escorpioni	(Canada) Ty Fisher	(Brazil) Leonardo Escorpioni	(Canada) Ty Fisher	Zanella Racing
7	Mid-Ohio Sports Car Course	(Brazil) João Vergara	(Australia) Liam Loiacono	(Brazil) João Vergara	(Brazil) João Vergara	VRD Racing
8	Mid-Ohio Sports Car Course	(Brazil) João Vergara	(Australia) Liam Loiacono	(Australia) Liam Loiacono	(Australia) Liam Loiacono	Jay Howard Driver Development
9	Mid-Ohio Sports Car Course	(Canada) Ty Fisher	(Brazil) João Vergara	(Canada) Ty Fisher (Brazil) Leonardo Escorpioni	(Brazil) Leonardo Escorpioni	Zanella Racing
10	Mid-Ohio Sports Car Course	(Canada) Ty Fisher	(Australia) Liam Loiacono	(Brazil) João Vergara	(Australia) Liam Loiacono	Jay Howard Driver Development
11	Road America	(Australia) Liam Loiacono	(Australia) Liam Loiacono	(Australia) Liam Loiacono	(Australia) Liam Loiacono	Jay Howard Driver Development
12	Road America	(Australia) Liam Loiacono	(Australia) Liam Loiacono	(Australia) Liam Loiacono	(Australia) Liam Loiacono	Jay Howard Driver Development
13	Road America	(Australia) Liam Loiacono	(Finland) Vilho Aatola	(Australia) Liam Loiacono	(Australia) Liam Loiacono	Jay Howard Driver Development
14	Portland International Raceway	(Brazil) Leonardo Escorpioni	(Brazil) Leonardo Escorpioni	(Brazil) Leonardo Escorpioni	(Brazil) Leonardo Escorpioni	Zanella Racing
15	Portland International Raceway	(Brazil) Leonardo Escorpioni	(Brazil) Leonardo Escorpioni	(Brazil) Leonardo Escorpioni	(Brazil) Leonardo Escorpioni	Zanella Racing
16	Portland International Raceway	(Brazil) Leonardo Escorpioni	(Brazil) Leonardo Escorpioni	(Canada) Ty Fisher	(Canada) Ty Fisher	Zanella Racing

== Championship standings ==
=== Drivers' Championship ===
Scoring system

Position	**1st**	**2nd**	**3rd**	**4th**	**5th**	**6th**	**7th**	**8th**	**9th**	**10th**	**11th**	**12th**	**13th**	**14th**	**15th**	**16th**	**17th**	**18th**	**19th**	**20th+**
Points	30	25	22	19	17	15	14	13	12	11	10	9	8	7	6	5	4	3	2	1

- The driver who qualified on pole was awarded one additional point.
- One point was awarded to the driver who led the most laps in a race.
- One point was awarded to the driver who set the fastest lap during a race.

Pos	Driver	NOL			ALA			MOH1		MOH2		ROA			POR			Points
1	(Brazil) Leonardo Escorpioni	3	1*	20	**1***	**1***	**3***	3	3	1*	3	4	2	2	**1***	**1***	**2**	403
2	(Australia) Liam Loiacono	6	**2**	6	6	7	8	5	1*	4	1	**1***	**1***	**1***	11	2	20	332
3	(Brazil) João Vergara	1*	5	3	4	4	5	**1***	**14**	2	2*	12	11	20	2	6	6	292
4	(Canada) Ty Fisher	4	4	**1***	5	2	1	4	16	**3***	**DSQ**	19	8	9	4	7	1*	285
5	(United States) Oliver Wheldon	**2**	3	2	11	3	2	2	2	6	19	13	7	17	18	4	17	250
6	(Mexico) Rodrigo González	5	9	5	3	6	6	6	17	5	10	2	16	18	6	3	4	235
7	(Finland) Vilho Aatola	15	6	4	2	5	4	8	5	7	6	16	6	4	3	10	21	234
8	(Mexico) Patricio González	18	12	9	7	20	9	9	4	10	13	5	3	3	14	5	3	208
9	(Mexico) Diego Guiot	7	7	7	21	11	7	11	9	8	5	9	9	7	10	8	5	198
10	(United States) Brenden Cooley	11	8	11	19	13	21	12	19	9	4	3	17	5	9	9	8	166
11	(United States) JT Hoskins	10	22	8	10	9	15	7	12	11	17	11	4	13	5	22	18	149
12	(United States) Michael Suco	9	11	18	8	8	11	14	7	14	9	18	10	19	7	14	22	139
13	(United States) Connor Aspley	22	18	21	20	14	22	13	6	12	14	6	5	6	20	18	15	110
14	(Israel) Matan Achituv	14	13	17	22	17	18	16	11	15	16	14	15	11	8	11	12	109
15	(United States) Emma Scarbrough	13	16	19	14	15	20	17	8	13	12	21	18	15	15	15	14	92
16	(United States) Kaylee Countryman	16	19	13	18	21	19	20	10	17	8	10	20	12	16	19	10	89
17	(United States) Thomas Nordquist	19	15	22	12	16	12	18	18	19	18	20	21	10	13	16	9	81
18	(United States) Hudson Potter	12	21	10	9	12	13	15	20	20	11	17	19	DNS	DNS	21	19	77
19	(Belgium) Karel Staut	8	10	14	13	10	10											61
20	(United States) Maddie Colleran	21	17	16	16	19	16	21	15	16	15	15	14	16	17	20	13	58
21	(United States) Colin Aitken											7	12	14	12	17	11	53
22	(United States) Rahim Alibhai											8	13	8	21	13	16	45
23	(United Kingdom) Harry Moss	17	14	12	17	22	17	19	13									39
24	(Canada) Justin Di Lucia														19	12	7	25
25	(United States) Lincoln Day	20	20	15	15	18	14											24
26	(United Kingdom) Chase Fernandez									18	7							17
27	(United Kingdom) Harley Keeble							10	21									12
Pos	Driver	NOL			ALA			MOH1		MOH2		ROA			POR			Points

Color	Result
Gold	Winner
Silver	2nd place
Bronze	3rd place
Green	4th & 5th place
Light Blue	6th–10th place
Dark Blue	Finished (Outside Top 10)
Purple	Did not finish
Red	Did not qualify (DNQ)
Brown	Withdrawn (Wth)
Black	Disqualified (DSQ)
White	Did not start (DNS)
Blank	Did not participate

**In-line notation**
**Bold**	Pole position (1 point)
Italics	Ran fastest race lap (1 point)
*	Led most race laps (1 point); Not awarded if more than one driver led most laps
Rookie

=== Teams' championship ===
Scoring system

Position	**1st**	**2nd**	**3rd**	**4th**	**5th**	**6th**	**7th**	**8th**	**9th**	**10th+**
Points	22	18	15	12	10	8	6	4	2	1

- Single car teams received 3 bonus points as an equivalency to multi-car teams.
- Only the best two results counted for teams fielding more than two entries.

Pos	Team	NOL			ALA			MOH1		MOH2		ROA			POR			Points
1	Zanella Racing	3	1	1	1	1	1	3	3	1	3	4	2	2	1	1	1	468
1	Zanella Racing	4	4	7	5	2	3	4	9	3	5	8	8	7	4	7	2	468
2	VRD Racing	1	3	2	4	3	2	1	2	2	2	7	7	11	2	4	5	345
2	VRD Racing	2	5	3	11	4	5	2	11	6	16	12	11	14	8	6	8	345
3	DEForce Racing	5	6	4	2	5	4	6	4	5	6	2	3	3	3	3	3	328
3	DEForce Racing	15	9	5	3	6	6	8	5	7	10	5	6	4	6	5	4	328
4	Jay Howard Driver Development	6	2	6	6	7	8	5	1	4	1	1	1	1	5	2	11	267
4	Jay Howard Driver Development	8	10	8	10	9	10	7	12	9	7	11	4	13	10	13	13	267
5	Exclusive Autosport	11	8	11	18	13	19	12	10	8	4	3	17	5	9	8	6	98
5	Exclusive Autosport	16	19	13	19	21	21	20	19	17	8	10	20	12	12	9	7	98
6	Pole Position Motorsports	22	18	21	20	14	22	13	6	10	14	6	5	6	13	12	10	94
7	International Motorsport	9	11	10	8	8	11	14	7	11	9	17	10	15	7	10	9	64
7	International Motorsport	12	16	18	9	12	13	15	8	12	11	18	18	19	11	11	12	64
Pos	Team	NOL			ALA			MOH1		MOH2		ROA			POR			Points

== See also ==
- 2025 IndyCar Series
- 2025 Indy NXT
- 2025 USF Pro 2000 Championship
- 2025 USF2000 Championship
