= Morgan Park Raceway =

Motorsports complex in Queensland, Australia

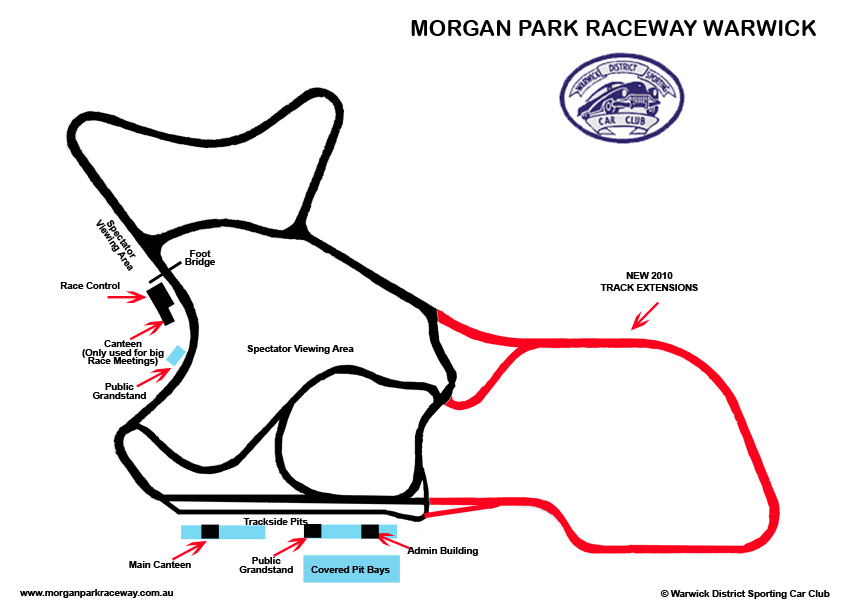
- Full Track Map (1997–present)
- Location: Warwick, Queensland
- Coordinates: 28°15′44″S 152°2′1″E
- Owner: Warwick District Sporting Car Club (1997–present)
- Operator: Warwick District Sporting Car Club (1997–present)
- Opened: 1997
- Major events: Current: Australian Superbike Championship (2015–2019, 2022–present); Former: Australian Formula Ford Championship (2022–2025); TA2 Racing Muscle Car Series (2019, 2023–2024); Australian Improved Production Nationals (2007, 2013, 2022); Australian Formula 3 Championship (2010–2011, 2017–2019); Porsche Sprint Challenge Australia (2009–2011); Aussie Racing Cars (2010)

Circuit A (1997–present)
- Length: 0.730 km (0.454 mi)

Circuit B (1998–present)
- Length: 1.200 km (0.746 mi)

Circuit C (2002–present)
- Length: 1.000 km (0.621 mi)

Circuit D (2002–present)
- Length: 1.500 km (0.932 mi)

Circuit E (2002–present)
- Length: 2.100 km (1.305 mi)
- Turns: 12
- Race lap record: 0:55.569 (Dean Tighe, Dallara - Judd, 2020, Formula Libre)

Circuit K (2010–present)
- Length: 2.967 km (1.844 mi)
- Turns: 12
- Race lap record: 1:05.891 (Dean Tighe, Dallara - Judd, 2023, Formula Libre)

Morgan Park Raceway is a motorsports complex located at Old Stanthorpe Road near Warwick, in Queensland, Australia and is operated by the Warwick District Sporting Car Club Inc. The venue features a race circuit with five different layouts.

== History ==
The initial 0.730 km (0.454 mi) race circuit was constructed in 1968 and the first race meeting was staged in March of the following year. The circuit was bitumen sealed in 1997 and an extension to 1.200 km (0.746 mi) was subsequently undertaken. A further extension to 2.100 km (1.305 mi) was completed in 2002 and the venue hosted its first Queensland Motor Racing Championships round the same year. In 2007 it hosted its first national championship races, the Formula Vee Nationals and the Australian Improved Production Nationals.

The new 2.967 km (1.844 mi) layout was first used on the weekend of 14–15 August 2010 for a round of the Shannons Nationals Motor Racing Championships. This meeting featured a round of Australia's oldest motor racing championship, the Australian Drivers' Championship, which was visiting Morgan Park for the first time.

Morgan Park hosts a round of the Australian Superbike Championship. It is the home of the Queensland state championships for both cars and motorcycles, as well as the WDSCC championships. The circuit is also home to Queensland's biggest historic motor racing festival held in July or August, hosted by the Historic Racing Car Club of Queensland. Porsche factory driver Matt Campbell's grandfather, Bill, was involved in the development and management of the circuit.

== Available circuits ==
"Circuit E" which is the former full circuit. The circuit has since been extended to Circuit K.

"Circuit B"

"Circuit D"

Not shown:

- "Circuit A"
- "Circuit C"

Existing circuits have only temporary names with permanent names chosen by fans.

== Events ==
Current

- May: Australian Superbike Championship, Masters of Morgan Park, Autumn Classic Speedfest
- September: State of Origin

Former

- Aussie Racing Cars (2010)
- Australian Formula 3 Championship (2010–2011, 2017–2019)
- Australian Formula Ford Championship (2022–2025)
- Australian Hyundai Excel Nationals (2016, 2022)
- Australian Improved Production Nationals (2007, 2013, 2022)
- Australian Manufacturers' Championship (2009–2011)
- Australian Sports Sedan Championship (2010–2011)
- Australian Superkart Championship (2010)
- Australian Suzuki Swift Series (2011, 2014–2015)
- Porsche Sprint Challenge Australia (2009–2011)
- Sports Racer Series (2011)
- TA2 Racing Muscle Car Series (2019, 2023–2024)

== Lap records ==
As of June 2025, the fastest official race lap records at Morgan Park Raceway are listed as:

Category	Time	Driver	Vehicle	Date
Circuit (2010–present): 2.967 km (1.844 mi)
Formula Libre	1:05.891	(Australia) Dean Tighe	Dallara - Judd	15 October 2023
Formula Three	1:07.948	(Australia) Calan Williams	Dallara F311	20 May 2017
Superbike	1:12.251	(Australia) Mike Jones	Yamaha YZF-R1M	16 July 2023
Sports Sedan	1:12.6124	(Australia) Tony Ricciardello	Alfa Romeo GTV-Chevrolet	14 August 2011
Sports prototype	1:12.628	(Australia) David Barram	Chiron LMP3-05	2 September 2017
Superkart	1:13.273	(Australia) Warren McIlveen	Stockman MR2 Honda	14 August 2010
GT3	1:14.105	(Australia) Hayden Cooper	Mosler MT900 GT3	2 September 2017
Supersport	1:14.372	(Australia) Archie McDonald	Yamaha YZF-R6	15 June 2025
Sports car racing	1:14.528	(Australia) Peter Opie	Radical SR3 RS	13 August 2011
Porsche Carrera Cup	1:16.809	(New Zealand) Jaxon Evans	Porsche 911 (991 I) GT3 Cup	24 September 2016
Formula Ford	1:16.942	(Australia) Liam Loiacono	Mygale SJ11A	16 June 2024
Improved Production Cars	1:20.096	(Australia) Zak Hudson	Mazda RX-7	29 August 2021
Group 3E	1:20.116	(Australia) Dalton Ellery	BMW M3 F80 Competition	28 August 2021
Formula Ford - Kent	1:20.678	(Australia) Hayden Cooper	Van Diemen RF02K	15 May 2011
Trans Am Australia	1:21.022	(Australia) Michael Kulig	Chevrolet Monte Carlo	3 September 2016
Group A	1:22.175	(Australia) Tony Alford	Nissan Skyline GT-R R32	30 April 2016
Supersport 300	1:22.650	(Australia) Brandon Demmery	Yamaha YZF-R3	16 July 2023
Aussie Racing Cars	1:25.497	(Australia) Jack Perkins	Aurion-Yamaha	6 November 2010
Group N	1:25.619	(Australia) Grant Wilson	Chevrolet Camaro	21 November 2020
Saloon Cars	1:27.099	(Australia) John Carter	Ford AU Falcon	9 September 2018
Formula Vee	1:28.576	(Australia) Gerrit Van de Pol	Sabre Volkswagen	6 June 2021
Series X3	1:32.270	(Australia) Jack Wood	Hyundai Excel X3	17 June 2023
Oceania Junior Cup	1:35.990	(Australia) Riley Nauta	Yamaha YZF-R15	15 July 2023
HQ Holden	1:36.009	(Australia) Brandon Madden	HQ Holden	28 September 2019
Holden Gemini Series	1:36.383	(Australia) Michael Dawes	Holden Gemini	15 April 2018
Circuit E: 2.100 km (2002–present): 2.100 km (1.305 mi)
Formula Libre	0:55.569	(Australia) Dean Tighe	Dallara - Judd	13 November 2020
