= Frankie Mossman =

American racing driver (born 2006)

- Nationality: (United States) American
- Born: February 7, 2006 (age 20) Medina, Ohio, United States

USF Pro 2000 Championship career
- Debut season: 2023
- Current team: Velocity Racing Development
- Car number: 84
- Former teams: Jay Howard Driver Development
- Starts: 23
- Podiums: 2
- Poles: 0
- Fastest laps: 1
- Best finish: 2nd in 2024

Previous series
- 2023 2022: Formula 4 United States Championship; USF2000 Championship

Championship titles
- 2

Frankie Mossman (born February 7, 2006) is an American racing driver. He currently competes in the 2025 USF Pro 2000 Championship driving for Velocity Racing Development. Mossman previously drove for Jay Howard Driver Development.

== Career ==
=== USF2000 Championship ===
In 2022, Mossman would compete at rounds 5–7 in the 2022 USF2000 Championship at the Indianapolis Motor Speedway driving for Jay Howard Driver Development. He would have a best finish of eighth in race 1.

=== Formula 4 United States Championship ===
For 2023, Mossman would make his debut in the 2023 Formula 4 United States Championship driving for Jay Howard Driver Development. He would score his best finish with winning race two at Road America before getting a post-race penalty for a jumpstart. Mossman would only contest half of the season even though he signed with the team for the full season. As a result, he would finish eleventh in the standings.

=== USF Pro 2000 Championship ===
==== 2023 ====
Following his stint in the Formula 4 United States Championship, Mossman paired up with Jay Howard Driver Development to debut in the 2023 USF Pro 2000 Championship at the Circuit of the Americas. He would finish a best of ninth at COTA, and come back for Portland International Raceway

==== 2024 ====
On December 14, 2023, it was announced that Mossman would compete in the 2024 USF Pro 2000 Championship full-time, sticking with Jay Howard Driver Development. At the first race at Road America, he would have a series best finish of second behind Lochie Hughes.

==== 2025 ====
Mossman returned for a second full year of the championship in 2025, remaining with Jay Howard Driver Development. Following the first two rounds of the championship at St. Petersburg and NOLA, Mossman switched teams mid-season to Velocity Racing Development, filling the seat vacated by Owen Tangavelou.

== Racing record ==
=== Racing career summary ===
Season	Series	Team	Races	Wins	Poles	F/Laps	Podiums	Points	Position
2022	USF2000 Championship	Jay Howard Driver Development	3	0	0	0	0	22	29th
2023	Formula 4 United States Championship	Jay Howard Driver Development	9	0	0	0	2	45.5	11th
2023	USF Pro 2000 Championship	Jay Howard Driver Development	5	0	0	0	0	37	25th
2024	USF Pro 2000 Championship	Jay Howard Driver Development	18	0	0	1	2	222	8th
2025	USF Pro 2000 Championship	Jay Howard Driver Development	5	0	0	0	0	203	8th
2025	USF Pro 2000 Championship	Velocity Racing Development	12	0	1	0	2	203	8th
2026	USF Pro 2000 Championship	Velocity Racing Development	18	0	0	1	5	289	5th

* Season still in progress.

=== American open-wheel racing results ===
==== USF2000 Championship ====
(key) (Races in bold indicate pole position) (Races in italics indicate fastest lap) (Races with * indicate most race laps led)

Year	Team	1	2	3	4	5	6	7	8	9	10	11	12	13	14	15	16	17	18	Rank	Points
2022	Jay Howard Driver Development	STP; 1	STP; 2	ALA; 1	ALA; 2	IMS; 1; 8	IMS; 2; 19	IMS; 3; 14	IRP	ROA; 1	ROA; 2	MOH; 1	MOH; 2	MOH; 3	TOR; 1	TOR; 2	POR; 1	POR; 2	POR; 3	29th	22

* Season still in progress.

==== Formula 4 United States Championship ====
(key) (Races in bold indicate pole position) (Races in italics indicate fastest lap)

Year	Team	1	2	3	4	5	6	7	8	9	10	11	12	13	14	15	16	17	18	Pos	Points
2023	Jay Howard Driver Development	NOL; 1; 18	NOL; 2; 10	NOL; 3; 5	ROA; 1; 3	ROA; 2; 10	ROA; 3; 2	MOH; 1 Ret	MOH; 2; 27	MOH; 3; 5	NJM; 1	NJM; 2	NJM; 3	VIR; 1	VIR; 2	VIR; 3	COA; 1	COA; 2	COA; 3	11th	45.4

==== USF Pro 2000 Championship ====
(key) (Races in bold indicate pole position) (Races in italics indicate fastest lap) (Races with * indicate most race laps led)

Year	Team	1	2	3	4	5	6	7	8	9	10	11	12	13	14	15	16	17	18	Rank	Points
2023	Jay Howard Driver Development	STP; 1	STP; 2	SEB; 1	SEB; 2	IMS; 1	IMS; 2	IRP	ROA; 1	ROA; 2	MOH; 1	MOH; 2	TOR; 1	TOR; 2	COTA; 1; 9	COTA; 2; 11	POR; 1; 17	POR; 2; 17	POR; 3; 15	25th	37
2024	Jay Howard Driver Development	STP; 1; 8	STP; 2; 4	LOU; 1; 9	LOU; 2; 11	LOU; 3; 9	IMS; 1; 19	IMS; 2; 10	IMS; 3; 8	IRP; 8	ROA; 1; 2	ROA; 2; 19	ROA; 3; 19	MOH; 1; 7	MOH; 2; 20	TOR; 1; 8	TOR; 2; 6	POR; 1; 3	POR; 2; 6	8th	222
2025	Jay Howard Driver Development	STP; 1; 21	STP; 2; 10	LOU; 1; 12	LOU; 2; 8	LOU; 3; 14														8th	203
2025	Velocity Racing Development						IMS; 1; 13	IMS; 2; 6	IMS; 3; 13	IRP	ROA; 1; 9	ROA; 2; 7	ROA; 3; 17	MOH; 1; 16	MOH; 2; 4	TOR; 1; 4	TOR; 2; 2*	**POR**; **1**; 3	POR; 2; 9	8th	203
2026	VRD Racing	ARL; 1; 2	ARL; 2; 3	IMS; 1; 7	IMS; 2; 2	IRP; 20	ROA; 1; 3	ROA; 2; 4	MOH; 1; 3	MOH; 2; 16	MOH; 3; 11	POR; 1; 12	POR; 2; 5	MAR; 1; 4	MAR; 2; 7	MIL; 7	ROA; 1; 4	ROA; 2; 7	ROA; 3; 5	5th	289

* Season still in progress.
