= 2026 Indy NXT =

American motor racing season

2026 Indy NXT season
- Indy NXT by Firestone

Season
- Races: 17
- Start date: March 1
- End date: September 6

Awards
- Drivers' champion: (United States) Nikita Johnson
- Rookie of the Year: (United States) Nikita Johnson

The 2026 Indy NXT by Firestone was the 40th season of Indy NXT by Firestone, the second-highest class of American open-wheel car racing, and the 24th season sanctioned by IndyCar. This was the fourth year of the championship running under the Indy NXT moniker following its acquisition by Penske Entertainment, the owner of the IndyCar Series, in 2022.

The championship was contested over 17 races, beginning in St. Petersburg on March 1 and ending in Laguna Seca on September 6. It was won by Cape Motorsports Powered by ECR driver Nikita Johnson, who in doing so also became Rookie of the Year.

== Teams and drivers ==
The following teams and drivers competed in the 2026 Indy NXT by Firestone. All teams competed with Dallara IL-15 chassis, inline four-cylinder engines developed by Advanced Engine Research, and tires supplied by Firestone.

Team	No.	Driver	Rounds
Abel Motorsports	12	(United States) Max Garcia R	All
Abel Motorsports	48	(United States) Jordan Missig	1–13
Abel Motorsports	48	(United States) Jacob Abel	14–17
Abel Motorsports	57	(United States) Colin Kaminsky	All
Abel Motorsports with Force Indy	99	(United States) Myles Rowe	All
Andretti Global	26	(Australia) Lochie Hughes	All
Andretti Global	27	(United Kingdom) Sebastian Murray	All
Andretti Global	28	(United States) Max Taylor	All
Andretti Global	29	(United States) Josh Pierson	All
A. J. Foyt Racing (Note: Technical partnership with HMD Motorsports.)	4	(Brazil) Nicholas Monteiro R	All
A. J. Foyt Racing	14	(Argentina) Alessandro de Tullio (Note: De Tullio is an Argentinian-American driver who competed under an American licence at rounds 1–2 and an Argentinian licence at rounds 3–17.) R	All
Cape Motorsports Powered by ECR	20	(Italy) Matteo Nannini	All
Cape Motorsports Powered by ECR	21	(United States) Nikita Johnson RY	All
Chip Ganassi Racing	8	(Republic of Ireland) James Roe	All
Chip Ganassi Racing	9	(United States) Bryce Aron	All
Chip Ganassi Racing	10	(Netherlands) Niels Koolen	All
Chip Ganassi Racing	11	(United States) Carson Etter R	All
Cusick Morgan Motorsports	15	(Australia) Nicolas Stati R	1–7, 9–17
Cusick Morgan Motorsports	15	(United States) Yuven Sundaramoorthy	8
Cusick Morgan Motorsports	68	(United States) Juan Manuel Correa	All
HMD Motorsports	17	(Mexico) Salvador de Alba	1–13, 15
HMD Motorsports	17	(United Kingdom) Bart Harrison R	14, 16–17
HMD Motorsports	45	(Australia) Jack Beeton R	All
HMD Motorsports	67	(Brazil) Enzo Fittipaldi R	All
HMD Motorsports	71	(Poland) Tymek Kucharczyk R	All
Juncos Hollinger Racing	75	(United States) Alexander Koreiba R	All
Juncos Hollinger Racing	76	(Mexico) Ricardo Escotto	1–10
Juncos Hollinger Racing	76	(United States) Nolan Allaer	11–12, 14, 16–17

Key
Symbol	Meaning
R	Eligible for Rookie of the Year
RY	Rookie of the Year

=== Team changes ===
- NTT IndyCar Series team Cusick Motorsports entered two cars in Indy NXT in a technical partnership with HMD Motorsports, which had downsized to four cars. In recognition of the changes made to Cusick Motorsports by team director Billy Morgan, the team was renamed to Cusick Morgan Motorsports.
- Cape Motorsports ended their multi-year collaboration with Andretti Global in favor of an alliance with Ed Carpenter Racing (ECR) and became known as Cape Motorsports Powered by ECR.
- Following a sabbatical year to focus on their IndyCar Series program, Juncos Hollinger Racing returned to Indy NXT.
- A. J. Foyt Racing reentered the series for the first time since 2004 in a strategic alliance with HMD Motorsports.

=== Driver changes ===
- On September 15, 2025, Abel Motorsports announced that 2025 USF Pro 2000 champion Max Garcia would graduate to Indy NXT with the team, driving the No. 12 entry for the 2026 season.
- On September 22, 2025, Cape Motorsports announced Nikita Johnson would join the team for his full-time debut in the 2026 season after previously competing in two rounds with HMD Motorsports in 2025.
- On September 23, 2025, Andretti Global confirmed that reigning champion Dennis Hauger would move up to the IndyCar series with Dale Coyne Racing.
- On September 30, 2025, Andretti Global announced that Sebastian Murray would move over from Andretti Cape Indy NXT to the main Andretti team for his second Indy NXT season.
- On October 14, 2025, Andretti Global announced their third driver in Max Taylor, who joined the team for his full-season debut after entering six events in 2025 driving for HMD Motorsports.
- On October 15, 2025, Cusick Morgan Motorsports announced that their first Indy NXT driver would be Nicolas Stati, who graduated from the Formula Regional Americas Championship.
- On October 21, 2025, Abel Motorsports announced that Colin Kaminsky would drive for the team in 2026 on his Indy NXT return after last competing in the series in 2023.
- On October 21, 2025, Andretti Global announced Josh Pierson as the final driver in its lineup, who moved over from HMD Motorsports for his fourth Indy NXT season.
- On October 24, 2025, Cusick Morgan Motorsports announced that Juan Manuel Correa would drive for the team in his full-time series debut.
- On October 29, 2025, HMD Motorsports announced the first driver of their four-car lineup: Jack Beeton made his Indy NXT debut after previously competing in the Formula Regional European Championship.
- On October 30, 2025, HMD Motorsport announced that former Formula 2 driver Enzo Fittipaldi would join the team on his Indy NXT debut in 2026.
- On November 5, 2025, A. J. Foyt Racing announced the first driver of the team's Indy NXT lineup in USF Pro 2000 graduate Alessandro de Tullio.
- On November 6, 2025, A. J. Foyt Racing confirmed reports that it had signed 2025 Indy NXT runner-up Caio Collet to drive the team's No. 4 IndyCar entry.
- On November 14, 2025, A. J. Foyt Racing announced the second driver of their Indy NXT lineup would be Nicholas Monteiro, stepping up from USF Pro 2000, where he came tenth in 2025.
- On December 17, 2025, Chip Ganassi Racing announced their expanded four-car lineup: returnees Bryce Aron and Niels Koolen were joined by James Roe, who moved over from Andretti Global for his fifth Indy NXT campaign, and Carson Etter, who stepped up from USF Pro 2000 after finishing the 2025 season in 17th with Exclusive Autosport.
- On January 13, 2026, Juncos Hollinger Racing announced the first driver of the team's Indy NXT lineup in Ricardo Escotto, who returned to the series after being released by Andretti Cape halfway through 2025. Escotto had previously made his Indy NXT debut with Juncos for a part-time program in 2024.
- On January 14, 2026, HMD Motorsports announced that reigning Euroformula Open Champion Tymek Kucharczyk would join them for the 2026 season.
- On January 15, 2026, HMD Motorsports announced that Salvador de Alba would move over from Andretti Global for his third year in the series, taking the final spot in their lineup.
- On January 31, 2026, Cape Motorsports announced their second driver in Matteo Nannini, who rejoined Indy NXT after last competing there in 2023 driving for Juncos Hollinger Racing.
- On February 19, 2026, Juncos Hollinger Racing announced the final driver of the 2026 grid in LMP3 driver and Indy NXT debutant Alexander Koreiba.

==== Mid-season changes ====
- One June 1, 2026, Cusick Morgan Motorsports announced that Yuven Sundaramoorthy would replace Nicolas Stati, who was unavailable due to prior commitments, at the WWTR round.
- On June 29, 2026, Ricardo Escotto announced he would race in FIA Formula 3, ending his Indy NXT campaign after the first ten rounds. Juncos Hollinger Racing announced his replacement for Mid-Ohio, Portland and Laguna Seca would be Nolan Allaer, who came 16th in 2025 driving for HMD Motorsports. This meant that for the rounds at Nashville and Milwaukee, the No. 76 car would remain vacant.
- On August 4, 2026, HMD Motorsports confirmed Eurocup-3 driver Bart Harrison would pilot the No. 17 car for Portland and the Laguna Seca double-header, replacing Salvador de Alba.
- On August 5, 2026, Jordan Missig and Abel Motorsports announced that Missig would end his season early after costs of damage sustained at Nashville were too high. For the remainder of the season, 2024 Indy NXT runner-up and IndyCar driver Jacob Abel would return to pilot the No. 48 car.

== Schedule ==
The 2026 Indy NXT by Firestone schedule was unveiled by IndyCar on September 25, 2025. A total of 17 races were included, the most for the series since 2021.

Icon	Legend
O	Oval/Speedway
R	Road course
S	Street circuit

Round	Date	Race	Track	Location
1	March 1	Indy NXT by Firestone Grand Prix of St. Petersburg	S St. Petersburg Street Circuit	St. Petersburg, Florida
2	March 15	Indy NXT by Firestone Grand Prix of Arlington	S Arlington Street Circuit	Arlington, Texas
3	March 28	Indy NXT by Firestone Grand Prix of Alabama	R Barber Motorsports Park	Birmingham, Alabama
4	March 29	Indy NXT by Firestone Grand Prix of Alabama	R Barber Motorsports Park	Birmingham, Alabama
5	May 8	Indy NXT by Firestone Grand Prix of Indianapolis	R Indianapolis Motor Speedway Road Course	Speedway, Indiana
6	May 9	Indy NXT by Firestone Grand Prix of Indianapolis	R Indianapolis Motor Speedway Road Course	Speedway, Indiana
7	May 31	Indy NXT by Firestone Detroit Grand Prix	S Detroit Street Circuit	Detroit, Michigan
8	June 7	Indy NXT by Firestone at World Wide Technology Raceway	O World Wide Technology Raceway	Madison, Illinois
9	June 20	Indy NXT by Firestone Grand Prix at Road America	R Road America	Elkhart Lake, Wisconsin
10	June 21	Indy NXT by Firestone Grand Prix at Road America	R Road America	Elkhart Lake, Wisconsin
11	July 4	Indy NXT by Firestone Grand Prix at Mid-Ohio	R Mid-Ohio Sports Car Course	Lexington, Ohio
12	July 5	Indy NXT by Firestone Grand Prix at Mid-Ohio	R Mid-Ohio Sports Car Course	Lexington, Ohio
13	July 19	Indy NXT by Firestone Music City Grand Prix	O Nashville Superspeedway	Lebanon, Tennessee
14	August 9	Indy NXT by Firestone Grand Prix of Portland	R Portland International Raceway	Portland, Oregon
15	August 30	Indy NXT by Firestone at the Milwaukee Mile	O Milwaukee Mile	West Allis, Wisconsin
16	September 5	Indy NXT by Firestone Grand Prix of Monterey	R WeatherTech Raceway Laguna Seca	Monterey, California
17	September 6	Indy NXT by Firestone Grand Prix of Monterey	R WeatherTech Raceway Laguna Seca	Monterey, California

=== Schedule changes ===
The only new track added to the schedule was the Arlington Street Circuit, which was the first track in Texas to host an Indy NXT race since the Circuit of the Americas in 2019. The weekends at Barber Motorsports Park, Road America, and the Mid-Ohio Sports Car Course became double-headers, while the Laguna Seca double-header returned to its traditional role as the season finale. Iowa Speedway was not part of the schedule.

== Background and series news ==
- On September 12, 2024, IndyCar announced that the Firestone Tire and Rubber Company had signed an extension to remain as the series' sole tire supplier until at least the 2030 season.
- On July 31, 2025, Fox Sports parent company Fox Corporation announced that it had acquired a one-third stake in IndyCar parent company Penske Entertainment. As part of the acquisition, Fox Sports' TV contract was extended to 2030.
- On December 11, 2025, IndyCar announced a new three-person independent officiating board for Indycar and Indy NXT, named IndyCar Officiating Inc. Two members – Ray Evernham and Raj Nair – were voted on to the panel by IndyCar team owners, while the third member – Ronan Morgan – was appointed by the FIA. Scot Elkins was later announced as the managing director of officiating.

== Race results ==
Rd.	Track	Pole position	Fastest lap	Most laps led	Race winner	
Rd.	Track	Pole position	Fastest lap	Most laps led	Driver	Team
1	Streets of St. Petersburg	(United States) Max Taylor	(United States) Max Taylor	(United States) Nikita Johnson	(United States) Nikita Johnson	Cape Motorsports Powered by ECR
2	Streets of Arlington	(Argentina) Alessandro de Tullio	(United States) Max Taylor	(Brazil) Enzo Fittipaldi	(United States) Max Taylor	Andretti Global
3	Barber Motorsports Park	(Argentina) Alessandro de Tullio	(Argentina) Alessandro de Tullio	(Argentina) Alessandro de Tullio	(United States) Nikita Johnson	Cape Motorsports Powered by ECR
4	Barber Motorsports Park	(Argentina) Alessandro de Tullio	(Brazil) Enzo Fittipaldi	(Argentina) Alessandro de Tullio	(Argentina) Alessandro de Tullio	A. J. Foyt Racing
5	Indianapolis Motor Speedway Road Course	(Argentina) Alessandro de Tullio	(Argentina) Alessandro de Tullio	(Australia) Lochie Hughes	(Brazil) Enzo Fittipaldi	HMD Motorsports
6	Indianapolis Motor Speedway Road Course	(United States) Max Taylor	(United States) Max Taylor	(Poland) Tymek Kucharczyk	(Poland) Tymek Kucharczyk	HMD Motorsports
7	Streets of Detroit	(Argentina) Alessandro de Tullio	(Brazil) Enzo Fittipaldi	(Poland) Tymek Kucharczyk	(Brazil) Enzo Fittipaldi	HMD Motorsports
8	World Wide Technology Raceway	(Australia) Lochie Hughes	(United States) Myles Rowe	(United States) Myles Rowe	(United States) Myles Rowe	Abel Motorsports with Force Indy
9	Road America	(Argentina) Alessandro de Tullio	(United States) Bryce Aron	(Australia) Lochie Hughes	(Australia) Lochie Hughes	Andretti Global
10	Road America	(Argentina) Alessandro de Tullio	(Poland) Tymek Kucharczyk (Note: Alessandro de Tullio originally claimed the fastest lap, but was disqualified for a tire violation. Tymek Kucharczyk inherited the fastest lap.)	—N/a (Note: Alessandro de Tullio led all 18 laps, but was disqualified from the race. No points were awarded for leading the most laps.)	(Italy) Matteo Nannini (Note: Alessandro de Tullio finished first on track, but was disqualified for a tire violation. Matteo Nannini inherited the win.)	Cape Motorsports Powered by ECR
11	Mid-Ohio Sports Car Course	(Brazil) Enzo Fittipaldi	(Brazil) Enzo Fittipaldi	(Brazil) Enzo Fittipaldi	(Brazil) Enzo Fittipaldi	HMD Motorsports
12	Mid-Ohio Sports Car Course	(Brazil) Enzo Fittipaldi	(Brazil) Enzo Fittipaldi	(Brazil) Enzo Fittipaldi	(Brazil) Enzo Fittipaldi	HMD Motorsports
13	Nashville Superspeedway	(Italy) Matteo Nannini	(Australia) Lochie Hughes	(Italy) Matteo Nannini	(Italy) Matteo Nannini	Cape Motorsports Powered by ECR
14	Portland International Raceway	(Argentina) Alessandro de Tullio	(United States) Jacob Abel	(Argentina) Alessandro de Tullio	(Argentina) Alessandro de Tullio	A. J. Foyt Racing
15	Milwaukee Mile	(United States) Josh Pierson	(Australia) Jack Beeton	(United States) Josh Pierson	(United States) Max Garcia	Abel Motorsports
16	WeatherTech Raceway Laguna Seca	(United States) Josh Pierson	(United States) Josh Pierson	(United States) Josh Pierson	(United States) Josh Pierson	Andretti Global
17	WeatherTech Raceway Laguna Seca	(Poland) Tymek Kucharczyk	(Poland) Tymek Kucharczyk	(Poland) Tymek Kucharczyk	(Poland) Tymek Kucharczyk	HMD Motorsports

== Season report ==
=== Opening rounds ===
The 2026 Indy NXT season began with 24 cars at the Grand Prix of St. Petersburg, the series' biggest grid since 2009. Cape/ECR's Nikita Johnson topped the first qualifying group, before Andretti's Max Taylor bettered his time in the second group to take pole position. Taylor covered the inside entering turn one at the start of the race, but a move around the outside saw Johnson claim the lead. HMD's Tymek Kucharczyk slotted into third, before a caution was called at the end of the lap. Two more interruptions followed, but the top group remained static throughout. Taylor shadowed Johnson but was unable to deter him from winning as Kucharczyk held off Andretti's Sebastian Murray for third.

Round two of the season saw a new venue for Indy NXT as A. J. Foyt's Alessandro de Tullio took pole position in qualifying around the Streets of Arlington. The race, shortened to 30 minutes after a schedule change, began under yellow after HMD's Jack Beeton made a huge jump start, Abel's Colin Kaminsky heavily collided with the wall and Kucharczyk pushed poleman De Tullio into an escape road. The race restarted with HMD's Enzo Fittipaldi leading Kucharczyk and Taylor. The trio battled for the lead throughout the rest of the race, with Taylor sliding past Kucharczyk before eventually taking the lead after a second caution period. His maiden win saw him take the championship lead by ten points.

The double-header at Barber Motorsports Park saw De Tullio notch up two more pole positions in qualifying. The first race began with a caution before De Tullio and Taylor began gapping the field after it was withdrawn. Taylor closely shadowed the leader until the pair encountered two CGR backmarkers. Taylor made a move for the lead, De Tullio retook the place one corner later, and the pair collided. Both dropped down the order, with Johnson slipping through to take the lead. The collision saw a second caution, and no changes in the order occurred afterwards. Johnson took the victory, reclaiming the championship lead by 28 points, with Fittipaldi and Kucharczyk completing the podium.

A day later, De Tullio and Taylor once again led the field to green. Taylor initially dropped behind Johnson at the start of the race, before passing him on lap two. The top three then began to pull away from the field, with Taylor remaining less than a second behind the leader throughout the race. On the final lap, Taylor shortened the gap to the leader to 0.3 seconds, but did not risk a move for the lead. De Tullio remained mistake-free to finally convert pole position to victory - his maiden Indy NXT win and A. J. Foyt Racing's first junior series victory since 2003. Johnson took third to remain championship leader as Taylor climbed to second place in the standings, 23 points behind him.

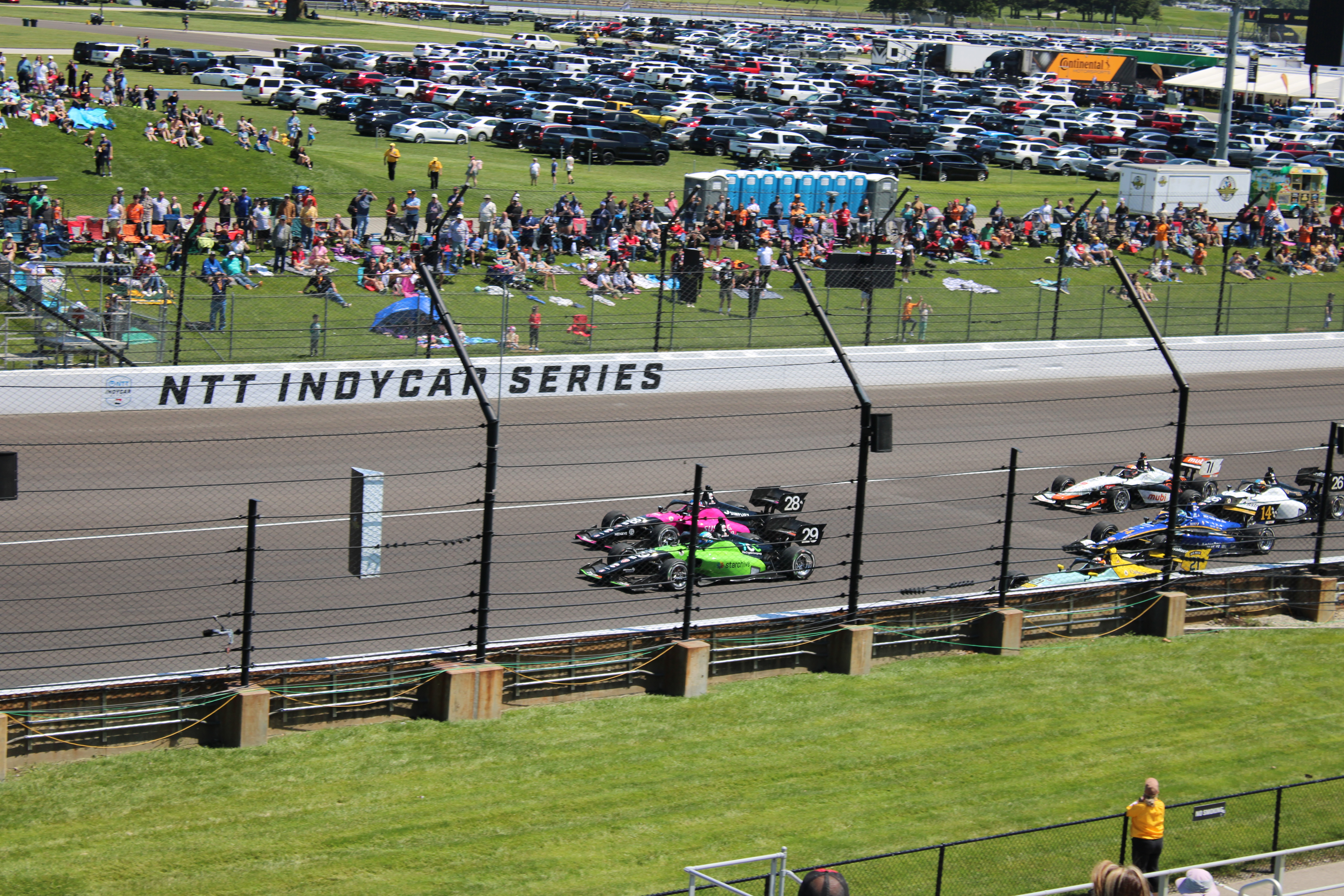
The start of the second race of the 2026 Indy NXT Indianapolis Grand Prix

Another double-header at Indianapolis Motor Speedway followed, where De Tullio claimed pole position for the first race. He ran wide at the opening corner, ceding the lead to Andretti's Lochie Hughes as Fittipaldi rose from tenth to fourth amid multiple first-lap incidents. The race was then halted when it started to rain, with all drivers switching to wet tires. Fittipaldi claimed second place off Taylor at the restart before a multi-lap battle with the leader saw him take the lead late on in the race. The race ended under caution, handing Fittipaldi his maiden series win and second place in the standings. Johnson claimed third after rising up the order in the wet and kept his 23-point standings lead.

The second race at IMS saw Taylor start from pole position after setting the fastest second-best lap. The race began with chaos as the top three all ran off in the opening corner. This allowed Kucharczyk, who had started fifth, to seize the lead. Taylor recovered to second and began chasing the leader. He attempted an overtake on lap 4, with Kucharczyk prevailing after slight contact. Taylor kept pressuring him, with Kucharczyk eventually suffering multiple lockups. Still, he held him off and was able to claim the first win for a Pole in Indy NXT history. Fittipaldi completed the podium in third as Johnson took sixth, his advantage over newly second-placed man Kucharczyk reduced to eleven points.

=== Mid-season rounds ===
De Tullio earned his fifth pole position of the season in Detroit ahead of Taylor and Kucharczyk. On the opening lap, Hughes collided with De Tullio at turn 3, dropping the polesitter several laps behind the field. Fittipaldi sustained front wing and nose damage in the ensuing chain reaction, while Kucharczyk took the lead. He held it until a restart on lap 27, when Abel/Force Indy's Myles Rowe attempted a diving pass for the lead at turn 3. Both drivers ran wide, allowing Fittipaldi to thread his car through to take the lead. He maintained the top spot through multiple restarts, ultimately winning under yellow ahead of Rowe and Kucharczyk to take a seven-point championship lead over Johnson.

The season's first oval round at WWTR saw Hughes claim pole position as Rowe and Fittipaldi were both excluded from qualifying. Hughes held the lead early on, while Rowe climbed up the order to 15th by the time an early caution came out. Pierson passed Hughes shortly after the restart as Rowe continued his climb, taking fifth on lap 28 before picking off the top four shortly thereafter and claiming the lead on lap 48. He managed the rest of the race afterwards to take a historic victory after starting last, as Hughes sank to sixth and de Tullio claimed second over Pierson. Fittipaldi had a technical issue at the start and ultimately came 13th, dropping two points behind Johnson in the standings.

De Tullio took two more pole positions in qualifying for the Road America double-header. The opening race began with multiple caution periods that disrupted the first half of the race. De Tullio managed that opening part from the lead as Hughes rose from fourth on the grid to second. A restart on lap nine then saw Hughes able to take the lead. He then built a 0.7-second lead over the field and controlled the rest of the race to claim Andretti's 100th win in series history. Teammate Pierson passed De Tullio on the final lap to make it an Andretti 1-2. Series leader Johnson finished sixth and championship chaser Fittipaldi suffered bad luck again, finished 22nd and dropped to third in the standings.

The second race of the weekend began with contact between Hughes, Pierson and Beeton off the start that put all three drivers out of contention. De Tullio built a lead at the front as JHR's Matteo Nannini passed Johnson for second place. Kucharczyk meanwhile climbed up the order after starting 16th, reaching fourth by lap six before dropping back down to eighth after a restart. He spent the final ten laps fighting back to third place, but Nannini and De Tullio were too far for him to reach. De Tullio took victory, before a tire rule infraction saw him disqualified post-race. Nannini therefore claimed his second series victory, with Johnson taking the final podium spot to now lead Kucharczyk by six points.

Pole position for both races at Mid-Ohio went to Fittipaldi, who broke the lap record on his fastest lap as he took his maiden P1 start. De Alba and Beeton started behind him, before both got overtaken by Kucharczyk after an early caution period. Two more safety car interruptions followed, but Fittipaldi remained faultless on both restarts, leaving no opening for Kucharczyk to attack. His continuous pace advantage over the field saw him set the fastest lap on the final lap before he won the race. Kucharczyk, Beeton and De Alba completed a historic HMD Motorsports 1-2-3-4. Pre-race points leader Johnson equaled his worst finish of the season in seventh, handing a seven-point lead to Kucharczyk.

Fittipaldi continued where he left off in race two, this time with De Tullio starting alongside him. The Argentine tried taking the lead on lap two, but ran off track and fell down the order. That handed second to Beeton, with Johnson following in third after overtaking Kucharczyk on the opening lap. Cusick Morgan's Juan Manuel Correa then also moved past Kucharczyk into fourth on lap eight as Fittipaldi began building a gap to the field. The race went ahead without interruption, allowing Fittipaldi to extend his lead to more than twelve seconds. The Brazilian took took victory again to sweep the weekend and claim a 17-point lead over Kucharczyk, with Johnson a further three points behind in third.

=== Closing rounds ===
Nashville Superspeedway hosted the second oval round of the year, and Nannini claimed pole position in qualifying. He held his lead as Johnson took second, before a caution came out when Correa collected a spinning car. Rowe challenged Nannini for the lead when the race resumed and overtook him on lap 18, before Nannini moved back in front. Another caution followed, before Hughes also entered the lead battle. Slight contact between Rowe and Hughes then allowed Nannini to build a gap, before Johnson was able to return to second. Nannini was unchallenged for the rest of the race and won, with Johnson retaking a single-point championship lead over Fittipaldi, who came eleventh.

Qualifying in Portland saw De Tullio beat Hughes to take the eighth pole position of his campaign as championship leaders Fittipaldi and Johnson qualified ninth and twelfth. Johnson dropped to 17th at the start as the top group held their positions. The top three of De Tullio, Hughes and Taylor remained unchanged throughout the race, with Kucharczyk spending the race in fourth to close up to the points leaders. Fittipaldi and Johnson worked their way up the order to minimize the damage to their lead, with the former finishing seventh to retake the championship lead by a single point over the latter in eighth. Kucharczyk's fourth place meant he was now 18 points off the lead.

Pierson took his maiden pole position in qualifying for the penultimate weekend at the Milwaukee Mile. He led Beeton and Kucharczyk from the start, controlling the opening stint as Kucharczyk first battled Beeton, but then ran high on lap 30, allowing Abel's Max Garcia through. A move on Beeton followed on lap 35, before Pierson spun out of an unthreatened lead on lap lap 54 and crashed. Garcia took the lead and easily held on to claim his maiden victory. Kucharczyk slipped down the order in the final stages, handing the podium places to Correa and Beeton and ultimately finishing twelfth. Johnson was able to move past Fittipaldi, take fifth place and claim a three-point championship lead.

The first leg of the season-ending double-header at Laguna Seca began with another pole position for Pierson. Kucharczyk started second, but contact with Rowe on the first lap saw him spin around and drop to 24th. Johnson avoided the incident and slotted into second place, with Garcia taking third. From that point on, Pierson controlled the race in front as Kucharczyk worked his way back up the order. Aided by a series of late cautions, he was able to recover to tenth place as the order at the front remained static. Pierson took his maiden victory as Johnson in second grew his championship lead over Fittipaldi, who finished eighth, with Kucharczyk now virtually out of championship contention.

Kucharczyk started the final race of the season from pole position. Pierson in second was hit by Garcia and spun into Koolen, with Johnson narrowly missing the crash to slot into third. That became second when Garcia was handed a drive-through penalty for the incident. Kucharczyk led the field on the restart and pulled away. He dominated the remainder of the race and won by 6.5 seconds to collect maximum points in the championship fight. Still, with Johnson resisting pressure from Hughes to finish second and Fittipaldi recovering from twelfth on the grid to fifth at the finish, Kucharczyk ended the season third in the standings, with Johnson taking the championship title with a 29-point margin.

== Championship standings ==
Scoring system

Position	**1st**	**2nd**	**3rd**	**4th**	**5th**	**6th**	**7th**	**8th**	**9th**	**10th**	**11th**	**12th**	**13th**	**14th**	**15th**	**16th**	**17th**	**18th**	**19th**	**20th**	**21st**	**22nd**	**23rd**	**24th**
Points	50	40	35	32	30	28	26	24	22	20	19	18	17	16	15	14	13	12	11	10	9	8	7	6

- The fastest driver in each qualifying session was awarded one additional point.
- Every driver who led at least one lap was awarded a bonus point, the driver who led the most laps received two points.

=== Drivers' championship ===
Pos	Driver	STP	ARL	BAR		IMS		DET	GAT	ROA		MOH		NSS	POR	MIL	LAG		Points
1	(United States) Nikita Johnson	1^{L}*	6	1^{L}	3	3	6	6	7	6	3	7	3	2	8	5	2	2	585
2	(Brazil) Enzo Fittipaldi	17	2^{L}*	2	4	1^{L}	3	1^{L}	13	22	4	**1**^{L}*	**1**^{L}*	11	7	7	8	5	556
3	(Poland) Tymek Kucharczyk	3	3	3	5	4	1^{L}*	3^{L}*	9	8	2	2	5	18	4	12	10	**1**^{L}*	551
4	(United States) Max Taylor	**2**	1^{L}	19	2	5	**2**	20	5	12	17	10	9	5	3	4	7	14	470
5	(Australia) Lochie Hughes	5	5	12	16	2^{L*}	4	21	**6**^{L}	1^{L}*	20	5	10	7	2^{L}	14	14	3	453
6	(Argentina) Alessandro de Tullio	10	**11**	**20**^{L}*	**1**^{L}*	**9**	5	**22**	2	**3**^{L}	**23**	6	8	9	**1**^{L}*	6	18	8	442
7	(United States) Juan Manuel Correa	9	4	11	8	12	11	9	14	7	7	22	4	23	6	2	4	12	389
8	(United States) Myles Rowe	6	9	5	23	7	24	2	1^{L}*	9	5	9	16	3^{L}	22	21	23	6	388
9	(Australia) Jack Beeton	11	15	9	9	21	13	13	11	4	6	3	2	8	13	3	19	10	382
10	(United States) Max Garcia	12	14	4	24	15	23	4	8	10	18	8	7	4	9	1^{L}	3	21	381
11	(United States) Josh Pierson	7	23	24	14	6	8	14	3^{L}	2	22	11	6	6	21	**22**^{L}*	**1^{L}***	24	364
12	(Italy) Matteo Nannini	19	8	15	13	23	7	11	20	5	1	14	12	**1**^{L}*	20	20	11	7	362
13	(United Kingdom) Sebastian Murray	4	7	22	10	20	9	5	12	13	15	15	15	13	15	11	22	11	306
14	(United States) Bryce Aron	18	18	8	7	22	12	8	23	21	10	16	14	10	16	8	6	9	298
15	(Netherlands) Niels Koolen	22	13	17	20	8	14	23	4	11	9	13	13	21	17	23	5	23	268
16	(Mexico) Salvador de Alba	8	20	18	11	13	10	12	22	18	8	4	11	12		19			245
17	(Australia) Nicolas Stati	16	21	10	15	14	21	7		17	12	23	17	15	23	13	17	15	227
18	(United States) Colin Kaminsky	15	24	16	18	16	15	10	17	20	21	17	22	19	12	18	15	13	222
19	(United States) Jordan Missig	14	10	6	6	11	16	15	10	24	16	12	20	22					216
20	(Republic of Ireland) James Roe	21	17	23	12	10	22	18	18	15	19	20	19	16	14	15	21	16	214
21	(United States) Alexander Koreiba	20	16	13	22	19	17	16	24	23	14	19	24	14	18	10	16	18	207
22	(United States) Carson Etter	24	19	21	21	17	19	19	16	16	13	21	23	20	24	16	20	19	182
23	(Brazil) Nicholas Monteiro	23	22	14	19	18	18	17	15	19	24	18	21	17	19	17	24	20	179
24	(Mexico) Ricardo Escotto	13	12	7	17	24	20	24	19	14	11								142
25	(United States) Jacob Abel														5	9	13	4	101
26	(United States) Nolan Allaer											24	18		11		9	22	67
27	(United Kingdom) Bart Harrison														10		12	17	51
28	(United States) Yuven Sundaramoorthy								21										9
Pos	Driver	STP	ARL	BAR		IMS		DET	GAT	ROA		MOH		NSS	POR	MIL	LAG		Points

Color	Result
Gold	Winner
Silver	2nd place
Bronze	3rd place
Green	4th & 5th place
Light Blue	6th–10th place
Dark Blue	Finished (Outside Top 10)
Purple	Did not finish
Red	Did not qualify (DNQ)
Brown	Withdrawn (Wth)
Black	Disqualified (DSQ)
White	Did not start (DNS)
Blank	Did not participate (DNP)
Blank	Not competing

**In-line notation**
**Bold**	Pole position (1 point)
Italics	Ran fastest race lap
^{L}	Led a race lap (1 point)
*	Led most race laps (2 points)
^{1}	Qualifying cancelled no bonus point awarded
Rookie
Rookie of the Year

- Ties in points broken by number of wins, or best finishes.

=== Entrants' championship ===
Entrants scored points in the same way drivers scored points, including bonus points for pole position and laps led.

Pos	Entry	STP	ARL	BAR		IMS		DET	GAT	ROA		MOH		NSS	POR	MIL	LAG		Points
1	#21 Cape Motorsports Powered by ECR	1^{L}*	6	1^{L}	3	3	6	6	7	6	3	7	3	2	8	5	2	2	585
2	#67 HMD Motorsports	17	2^{L}*	2	4	1^{L}	3	1^{L}	13	22	4	**1**^{L}*	**1**^{L}*	11	7	7	8	5	556
3	#71 HMD Motorsports	3	3	3	5	4	1^{L}*	3^{L}*	9	8	2	2	5	18	4	12	10	**1**^{L}*	551
4	#28 Andretti Global	**2**	1^{L}	19	2	5	**2**	20	5	12	17	10	9	5	3	4	7	14	470
5	#26 Andretti Global	5	5	12	16	2^{L*}	4	21	**6**^{L}	1^{L}*	20	5	10	7	2^{L}	14	14	3	453
6	#14 A. J. Foyt Racing	10	**11**	**20**^{L}*	**1**^{L}*	**9**	5	**22**	2	**3**^{L}	**23**	6	8	9	**1**^{L}*	6	18	8	442
7	#68 Cusick Morgan Motorsports	9	4	11	8	12	11	9	14	7	7	22	4	23	6	2	4	12	389
8	#99 Abel Motorsports with Force Indy	6	9	5	23	7	24	2	1^{L}*	9	5	9	16	3^{L}	22	21	23	6	388
9	#45 HMD Motorsports	11	15	9	9	21	13	13	11	4	6	3	2	8	13	3	19	10	382
10	#12 Abel Motorsports	12	14	4	24	15	23	4	8	10	18	8	7	4	9	1^{L}	3	21	381
11	#29 Andretti Global	7	23	24	14	6	8	14	3^{L}	2	22	11	6	6	21	**22**^{L}*	**1^{L}***	24	364
12	#20 Cape Motorsports Powered by ECR	19	8	15	13	23	7	11	20	5	1	14	12	**1**^{L}*	20	20	11	7	362
13	#48 Abel Motorsports	14	10	6	6	11	16	15	10	24	16	12	20	22	5	9	13	4	317
14	#27 Andretti Global	4	7	22	10	20	9	5	12	13	15	15	15	13	15	11	22	11	306
15	#9 Chip Ganassi Racing	18	18	8	7	22	12	8	23	21	10	16	14	10	16	8	6	9	298
16	#17 HMD Motorsports	8	20	18	11	13	10	12	22	18	8	4	11	12	10	19	12	17	296
17	#10 Chip Ganassi Racing	22	13	17	20	8	14	23	4	11	9	13	13	21	17	23	5	23	268
18	#15 Cusick Morgan Motorsports	16	21	10	15	14	21	7	21	17	12	23	17	15	23	13	17	15	236
19	#57 Abel Motorsports	15	24	16	18	16	15	10	17	20	21	17	22	19	12	18	15	13	222
20	#8 Chip Ganassi Racing	21	17	23	12	10	22	18	18	15	19	20	19	16	14	15	21	16	214
21	#76 Juncos Hollinger Racing	13	12	7	17	24	20	24	19	14	11	24	18		11		9	22	209
22	#75 Juncos Hollinger Racing	20	16	13	22	19	17	16	24	23	14	19	24	14	18	10	16	18	207
23	#11 Chip Ganassi Racing	24	19	21	21	17	19	19	16	16	13	21	23	20	24	16	20	19	182
24	#4 A. J. Foyt Racing	23	22	14	19	18	18	17	15	19	24	18	21	17	19	17	24	20	179
Pos	Entry	STP	ARL	BAR		IMS		DET	GAT	ROA		MOH		NSS	POR	MIL	LAG		Points

== See also ==
- 2026 IndyCar Series
- 2026 USF Pro 2000 Championship
- 2026 USF2000 Championship
- 2026 USF Juniors
