= Chris Griffis Memorial Test =

Motorsport test event

The Chris Griffis Memorial Test is a two-day test event for Road to Indy racing series. The testing is conducted after the regular season. The test is used by teams to test new drivers as well as for the organization to test new cars for the following season.

== Chris Griffis ==
Chris Griffis (11 May 1966 – 12 September 2011) was a former team manager for Schmidt Peterson Motorsports (now Arrow McLaren). Griffis started his career at Patrick Racing, working with Gordon Johncock, Emerson Fittipaldi among others. In 1990, Griffis joined Chip Ganassi Racing before moving to King Racing in 1993 and later joining Panther Racing in 2002. At Panther Racing, Griffis was the crew chief of Mark Taylor winning the 2003 Indy Lights title.

Griffis collapsed and died after a basketball game. He was survived by his wife Mari and daughters (Clair and Sophia). Griffis was buried in Akron, Indiana.

== Fastest times ==
Year	Indy Lights / Indy NXT	Indy Pro 2000 / USF Pro 2000	USF2000	USF Juniors
2011	(Republic of Ireland) Peter Dempsey (1:20.6546)	(United Kingdom) Jack Hawksworth (1:25.431)	(Canada) Scott Hargrove (1:29.6937)	
2012	(United States) Zach Veach (1:19.2209)	(United States) Spencer Pigot (1:24.859)	(Canada) Matthew Di Leo (1:27.623)	
2013	(France) Alexandre Baron (1:15.726)	(Mexico) Alfonso Celis Jr. (1:20.490)	(United States) Aaron Telitz (1:23.283)	
2014	(United States) Spencer Pigot (1:19.8039)	(Mexico) Patricio O'Ward (1:23.6525)	(France) Nico Jamin (1:26.3304)	
2015	(United States) Kyle Kaiser (1:54.2235)	(Mexico) Patricio O'Ward (2:04.7677)	(Russia) Nikita Lastochkin (2:09.5454)	
2016	(Canada) Garett Grist (1:14.7396)	(Brazil) Victor Franzoni (1:22.6179)	(United States) Neil Verhagen (1:24.8661)	
2017	(France) Nico Jamin (1:25.7173)	(United States) Oliver Askew (1:29.8142)	(United States) Darren Keane (1:25.1424)	
2018	(United States) Ryan Norman (1:14.9283)	(United States) Darren Keane (1:19.2971)	(Australia) Hunter McElrea (1:24.5064)	
2019	(Netherlands) Rinus VeeKay (1:15.4790)	(Australia) Hunter McElrea (1:19.4553)	(Denmark) Christian Rasmussen (1:24.9311)	
2021	(Denmark) Benjamin Pedersen (1:25.4619)	(United Kingdom) Louis Foster (1:30.4354)	(United States) Jagger Jones (1:35.4672)	
2022	(Singapore) Danial Frost (1:16.2526)	(United States) Jack William Miller (1:21.9745)	(United States) Simon Sikes (1:25.8876)	
2023	(United Kingdom) Louis Foster (1:14.8432)	(United States) Simon Sikes (1:21.8032)	(United States) Hudson Schwartz (1:25.8372)	(United States) Jack Jeffers (1:29.2054)
2024	(United States) Myles Rowe (1:15.1848)	(United States) Max Garcia (1:21.8215)	(United Kingdom) Liam McNeilly (1:26.1548)	(Brazil) João Vergara (1:29.6305)

== Track ==
Period	Track	Layout	Length
2011–2012	Indianapolis Motor Speedway		2.5134 miles
2013	Barber Motorsports Park		2.38 miles
2014–2019, 2021–present	Indianapolis Motor Speedway		2.439 miles

== Drivers who tested but not raced ==
The below table contains drivers who tested during the Chris Griffis Memorial Test in Indy Lights, USF Pro 2000 or USF2000 but not competed in any of the classes.

Year	Series	Driver	Team
2012	USF2000	(United States) Joe Ruch	Afterburner Autosport
2012	USF2000	(Brazil) Yukio Duzanowski	Belardi Auto Racing
2012	USF2000	(United States) Nick Neri	Belardi Auto Racing
2012	USF2000	(Canada) Michael Adams	JAY Motorsports
2012	USF2000	(Norway) Kevin Aabol	JDC MotorSports
2012	USF2000	(Finland) Antti Buri	JDC MotorSports
2012	USF2000	(Estonia) Tristan Viidas	Pabst Racing Services
2012	Star Mazda	(Mexico) Jose Carlos Sandoval	JDC MotorSports
2012	Star Mazda	(Brazil) Renan Guerra	Juncos Racing
2012	Star Mazda	(Costa Rica) Andre Solano	Team GDT
2012	Star Mazda	(Italy) Luca Orlandi	Team Pelfrey
2012	Star Mazda	(United States) Chris Yano	Team Pelfrey
2012	Indy Lights	(Australia) Nick McBride	Sam Schmidt Motorsports
2014	USF2000	(United States) Jordan Bernloehr	Afterburner Autosport
2014	USF2000	(United States) Christian Ross	Afterburner Autosport
2014	Indy Lights	(United States) Parker Kligerman	Schmidt Peterson Motorsports
2015	USF2000	(United States) Chase Owen	Afterburner Autosport
2015	USF2000	(Australia) Cameron Hill	JDC MotorSports
2015	USF2000	(Canada) Chase Pelletier	Team Pelfrey
2015	USF2000	(United States) Max Mallinen	SWAN Motorsports
2015	Pro Mazda	(Brazil) Henrique Baptista	Team Pelfrey
2016	USF2000	(Brazil) Leandro Wolther	ArmsUp Motorsports
2016	USF2000	(United States) Ryan Norberg	JDC MotorSports
2016	USF2000	(Switzerland) Hugo de Sadeleer	Pabst Racing
2016	USF2000	(United States) Neil Verhagen	Pabst Racing
2016	Indy Lights	(Slovakia) Richard Gonda	Andretti Autosport
2017	USF2000	(United States) Zoey Edenholm	BN Racing
2017	USF2000	(United States) Elliott Finlayson	BN Racing
2017	USF2000	(United States) Justin Gordon	Exclusive Autosport
2017	USF2000	(United States) Jaden Conwright	Team BENIK
2017	Pro Mazda	(Netherlands) Leonard Hoogenboom	BN Racing
2018	USF2000	(United States) Tyler O'Connor	Cape Motorsports
2018	USF2000	(United States) Ryan Bjerke	DEForce Racing
2018	USF2000	(Canada) Logan Cusson	Pabst Racing
2019	USF2000	(United States) TJ Thompson	HMD Motorsports
2019	USF2000	(United States) Jonathan Kotyk	Legacy Autosport
2019	USF2000	(Netherlands) Rick Bouthoorn	Pabst Racing
2019	USF2000	(United States) Harry Voigt	Team E Jay Racing
2019	IP2000	(South Africa) Raoul Hyman	Exclusive Autosport
2019	Indy Lights	(Russia) Egor Orudzhev	Andretti Autosport
2021	USF2000	(United States) TJ Thompson	Jay Howard Driver Development
2021	IP2000	(United States) Arias Deukmedjian	Deuk Spine Racing
2021	IP2000	(United States) Nicholas Rivers	Jay Howard Driver Development
2021	IP2000	(United States) Blake Upton	Turn 3 Motorsport
2022	USF2000	(United States) Jason Pribyl	Turn 3 Motorsport
2022	USF2000	(United Kingdom) Matthew Rees	VRD Racing
2022	USFP2000	(United Kingdom) Callum Voisin	Jay Howard Driver Development
2022	USFP2000	(South Africa) Raoul Hyman	TJ Speed Motorsports
2023	USF2000	(United States) Michael Boyiadzis	Jay Howard Driver Development
2023	USF2000	(United States) Jason Pribyl	Pabst Racing
2023	USF2000	(United States) Connor Roberts	Team Roberts
2024	USF2000	(United States) Cooper Shipman	VRD Racing
2024	USF2000	(Canada) Mayer Deonarine	VRD Racing
2025	USF2000	(Portugal) Max Radeck	DEForce Racing
2025	USF2000	(United States) Chase Supplee	Enve Motorsport
2025	USF2000	(United States) Kekai Hauanio	Jay Howard Driver Development
2025	USF2000	(United States) Ethan Booher	VRD Racing
2025	USF2000	(Canada) Jensen Burnett	VRD Racing
2025	USF2000	(Canada) Ty Fisher	Zanella Racing
2025	USFP2000	(Colombia) Joao Balesteiro	Jay Howard Driver Development
2025	USFP2000	(Portugal) Ivan Domingues	Pabst Racing
2025	USFP2000	(Brazil) Bruno Ribeiro	TJ Speed Motorsports
2025	Indy NXT	(France) Victor Martins	HMD Motorsports
