= Max Garcia (racing driver) =

American racing driver (born 2009)

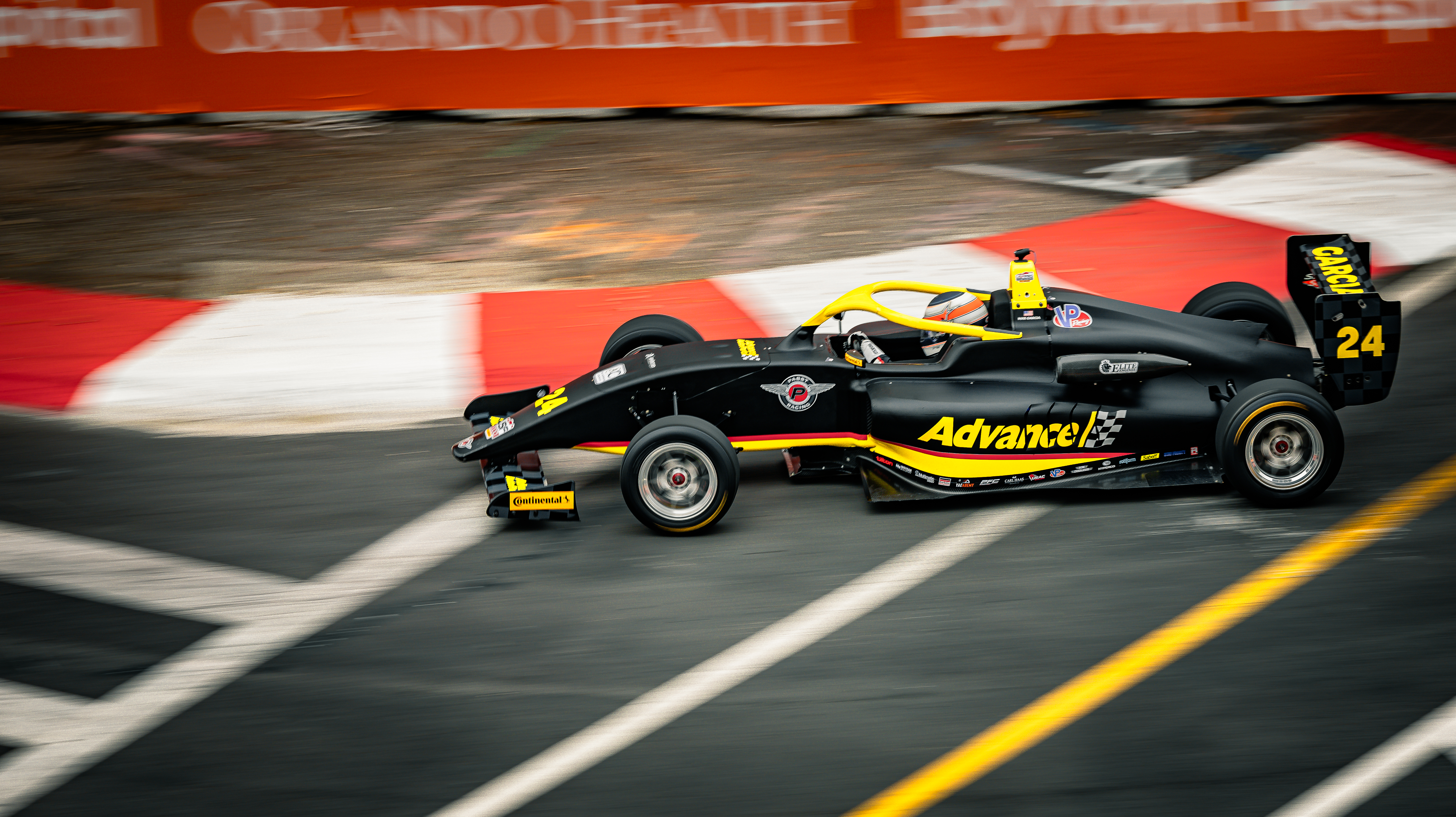
- Garcia at the Grand Prix of St. Petersburg in 2024
- Nationality: (United States) American
- Born: Max Garcia; March 17, 2009 (age 17) Miami, Florida, U.S.

Indy NXT career
- Debut season: 2026
- Current team: Abel Motorsports
- Categorisation: FIA Silver
- Car number: 12
- Starts: 0
- Wins: 1
- Podiums: 0
- Poles: 0
- Fastest laps: 0
- Best finish: 10th in 2026

Previous series
- 2025 2023–24: USF Pro 2000 Championship; USF2000 Championship

Championship titles
- 2025 2024: USF Pro 2000 Championship; USF2000 Championship

Max Garcia (born March 17, 2009) is an American racing driver who currently competes in the Indy NXT for Abel Motorsports. He is the 2024 USF2000 champion and the 2025 USF Pro 2000 Championship champion.

== Career ==
=== Karting ===
Garcia began karting at the age of seven, winning championships including the SKUSA Micro National Championship in 2018 and the United States Pro Kart Mini National Championship in 2020.

=== USF2000 Championship ===
Garcia competed in the USF2000 Championship in 2023 and 2024, both with Pabst Racing, winning the championship during his second season with five wins.

=== USF Pro 2000 Championship ===
Following his 2024 USF2000 Championship title, Garcia moved up to compete in the 2025 USF Pro 2000 Championship continuing with Pabst Racing. After a podium in the opening race of the season, Garcia took his maiden win in race two at St. Petersburg. He left the weekend leading the points standings, as race one winner Alessandro de Tullio crashed in race two. Garcia followed this up with two pole positions and another win in NOLA, and led the standings with a sixteen-point gap to de Tullio. Garcia extended his championship lead with a podium at Indianapolis, and went on to win two races of the three races during the Road America round. Garcia won both races at the Mid-Ohio round, claiming 66 points (the maximum for the round), helping Pabst Racing win the teams' championship. By winning the first race in Toronto, Garcia clinched the drivers' championship with three races to spare.

=== Indy NXT ===
After winning the USF Pro 2000 Championship, Garcia is set to make the promotion to Indy NXT in 2026 with Abel Motorsports.

== Karting record ==
=== Karting career summary ===
Season	Series	Team	Position
2018	SKUSA SuperNationals – Micro Swift class by Parolin	KartSport North America	3rd
2018	SKUSA Pro Tour – Micro Swift		1st
2019	SKUSA SuperNationals – Mini Swift		5th
2019	SKUSA Pro Tour – Mini Swift		12th
2019	IAME International Final – X30 Mini		18th
2020	SKUSA Winter Series – Mini Swift		1st
2020	Florida Winter Tour – Mini ROK	Kart Republic North America	27th
2020	SKUSA Pro Tour – Mini Swift		2nd
2021	SKUSA SuperNationals – X30 Junior	MPG Motorsports	2nd
2022	CIK-FIA European Championship – OKJ	DPK Racing	NC
2022	SKUSA SuperNationals XXV – X30 Junior	MPG Motorsports	3rd
2022	SKUSA SuperNationals XXV – KA100 Junior	MPG Motorsports	13th

== Racing record ==
=== Racing career summary ===
Season	Series	Team	Races	Wins	Poles	F/Laps	Podiums	Points	Position
2023	USF2000 Championship	Pabst Racing	16	0	0	0	2	207	9th
2024	USF2000 Championship	Pabst Racing	18	5	7	3	10	428	**1st**
2025	USF Pro 2000 Championship	Pabst Racing	18	9	9	12	13	495	**1st**
2026	Indy NXT	Abel Motorsports	17	1	0	0	2	381	10th
2026-27	Asian Le Mans Series - LMP2	Nielsen Racing							

^{*} Season still in progress.

=== American open–wheel racing results ===
==== USF2000 Championship ====
(key) (Races in bold indicate pole position) (Races in italics indicate fastest lap) (Races with * indicate most race laps led)

Year	Team	1	2	3	4	5	6	7	8	9	10	11	12	13	14	15	16	17	18	Rank	Points
2023	Pabst Racing	STP; 1	STP; 2	SEB; 1; 6	SEB; 1; 7	IMS; 1; 18	IMS; 2; 11	IMS; 3; 4	IRP; 7	ROA; 1; 15	ROA; 2; 3	MOH; 1; 20	MOH; 2; 5	MOH; 3; 7	TOR; 1; 2	TOR; 2; 15	POR; 1; 6	POR; 2; 18	POR; 3; 5	9th	207
2024	Pabst Racing	**STP**; **1**; 1	**STP**; **2**; 1*	NOL; 1; 1*	**NOL**; **2**; 3	**NOL**; **3**; 4	IMS; 1; 6	IMS; 2; 1	IRP; 7	**ROA**; **1**; 4*	ROA; 2; 6	MOH; 1; 2	MOH; 2; 4	MOH; 3; 4	**TOR**; **1**; 3	TOR; 2; 4	**POR**; **1**; 2	POR; 2; 1	POR; 3; 2	1st	428

==== USF Pro 2000 Championship ====
(key) (Races in bold indicate pole position) (Races in italics indicate fastest lap)

Year	Team	1	2	3	4	5	6	7	8	9	10	11	12	13	14	15	16	17	18	Position	Points
2025	Pabst Racing	STP; 1; 2	STP; 2; 1*	**LOU**; **1**; 2	LOU; 2; 2	**LOU**; **3**; 1*	IMS; 1; 4	IMS; 2; 3	IMS; 3; 4	IRP; 4	**ROA**; **1**; 1*	**ROA**; **2**; 1*	**ROA**; **3**; 4	**MOH**; **1**; 1*	**MOH**; **2**; 1*	**TOR**; **1**; 1*	TOR; 2; 9	POR; 1; 1*	**POR**; **2**; 1*	1st	495

==== Indy NXT ====
(key) (Races in bold indicate pole position) (Races in italics indicate fastest lap) (Races with ^{L} indicate a race lap led) (Races with * indicate most race laps led)

Year	Team	1	2	3	4	5	6	7	8	9	10	11	12	13	14	15	16	17	Rank	Points
2026	Abel Motorsports	STP; 12	ARL; 14	BAR; 4	BAR; 24	IMS; 15	IMS; 23	DET; 4	GAT; 8	ROA; 10	ROA; 18	MOH; 8	MOH; 7	NSS; 4	POR; 9	MIL; 1	LAG; 3	LAG; 21	10th	381

* Season still in progress.
