= 2025 USF Pro 2000 Championship =

Racing season

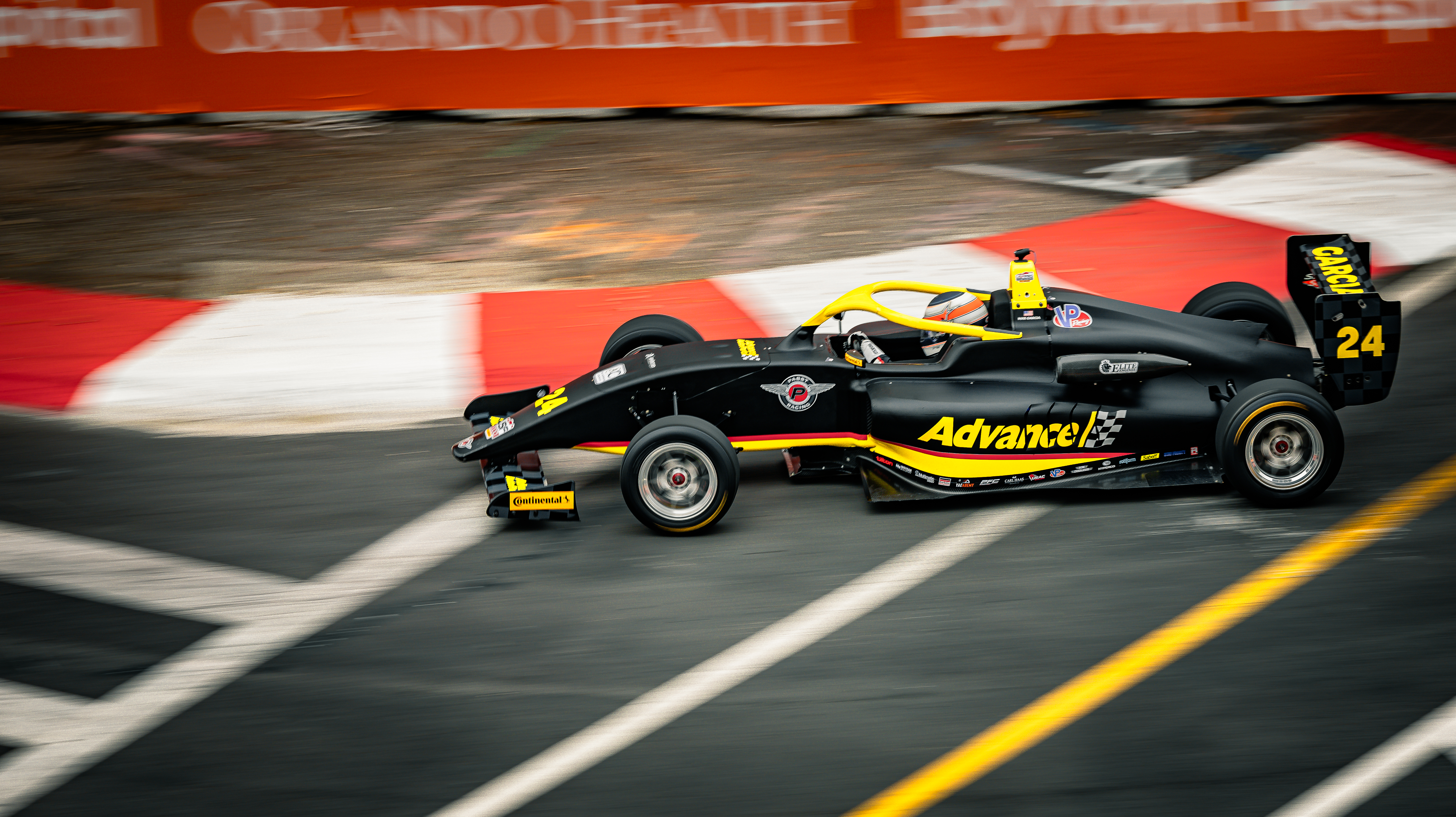
Pabst Racing driver Max Garcia (pictured in 2024) won the Drivers' Championship in his rookie season, while his Team won the Teams' Championship.

The 2025 USF Pro 2000 Championship presented by Continental Tire was the 27th season of the junior series two levels below the IndyCar series. It was the third season under the USF Pro 2000 moniker after the championship's most recent rebrand in 2023.

Pabst Racing's Max Garcia claimed the Drivers' Championship with three races to spare, while his team defended their Teams' Championship title for the third year in a row.

== Series news ==
- The scholarship for the champion was decreased by over $100,000 to $546,500.
- The power output by the Elite Mazda engines on road and street circuits was increased, with a heightened rev limit from 7850 rpm to 8350 rpm resulting in a power increase of up to 40 horsepower.

== Drivers and teams ==
All drivers competed using Tatuus IP-22 racecars with Elite Mazda 2.0-014A engines and Continental tires.

Team	No.	Driver(s)	Status	Round(s)
Comet/NCMP Racing	21	(United States) Logan Adams		1–8, 10–16
DEForce Racing	8	(Vietnam) Owen Tangavelou	R	6–8
DEForce Racing	9	(Brazil) Nicholas Monteiro		1–5
DEForce Racing	10	(Mexico) Jorge Garciarce		All
Exclusive Autosport	90	(Canada) Mac Clark		All
Exclusive Autosport	91	(United States) Joey Brienza	R	All
Exclusive Autosport	92	(United States) Carson Etter	R	All
FatBoy Racing!	83	(United States) Charles Finelli		1–12
Jay Howard Driver Development	4	(United States) Tanner DeFabis	R	1–2, 6–9
Jay Howard Driver Development	4	(Canada) Nick Gilkes	R	13–16
Jay Howard Driver Development	6	(United States) Frankie Mossman		1–5
Jay Howard Driver Development	6	(United Kingdom) Liam McNeilly	R	15–16
Pabst Racing	18	(United States) Max Garcia	R	All
Pabst Racing	19	(New Zealand) Jacob Douglas	R	All
Pabst Racing	20	(United States) Michael Costello	R	All
TJ Speed Motorsports	26	(United States) Jace Denmark		1–9
TJ Speed Motorsports	26	(Australia) Miles Bromley	R	17–18
TJ Speed Motorsports	27	(Israel) Ariel Elkin	R	All
TJ Speed Motorsports	28	(New Zealand) Sebastian Manson	R	All
Turn 3 Motorsport	2	(United States) Cooper Becklin		All
Turn 3 Motorsport	3	(United States) Titus Sherlock	R	1–2
Turn 3 Motorsport	3	(United States) Brady Golan	R	6–9, 13–18
Turn 3 Motorsport	3	(United Kingdom) Joseph Loake	R	10–12
Turn 3 Motorsport	22	(United States) Elliot Cox	R	1–2
Turn 3 Motorsport	22	(Brazil) Nicholas Monteiro		6–16
Turn 3 Motorsport	33	(United States) Tyke Durst		All
Turn 3 Motorsport	44	(United States) Alessandro de Tullio		All
Velocity Racing Development	84	(Vietnam) Owen Tangavelou	R	1–5
Velocity Racing Development	84	(United States) Frankie Mossman		6–8, 10–18
Velocity Racing Development	88	(United States) Max Taylor	R	All

Icon	Status
R	Rookie

=== Team changes ===
BN Racing, which only returned to competition in the series in 2024, did not confirm its presence in the 2025 championship or any driver signings ahead of the season and did not enter any rounds.

=== Driver changes ===
Reigning Teams' Champions Pabst Racing took on three new drivers as Jace Denmark moved to TJ Speed Motorsports and Simon Sikes and Christian Brooks left the championship. Reigning USF2000 Champion Max Garcia remained with the team for his move up to USF Pro 2000, while Jacob Douglas returned to Pabst, with whom he came sixth in USF2000 in 2023. Michael Costello, the only newcomer to the Pabst Racing fold, stepped up to USFP2000 after coming ninth in USF2000 with JHDD to complete the team's lineup.

Only one of Turn 3 Motorsport's five drivers remained in the series as Drivers' Champion Lochie Hughes graduate to Indy NXT with Andretti Global, Danny Dyszelski left the team and Adam Fitzgerald and Ethan Ho had already departed mid-way through the 2024 season. Alessandro de Tullio, who entered six races with BN Racing in 2024, replaced Hughes in the No. 44 car, while Cooper Becklin, who entered nine races with TJ Speed Motorsports in 2024, piloted the No. 2 car. Two more drivers joined the team for the first race weekend in Titus Sherlock, who moved over from FR Americas after coming fourth in 2024 driving for Crosslink Kiwi Motorsports, and Elliot Cox, who stepped up from USF2000 after finishing sixth driving for Sarah Fisher Hartman Racing Development.

Velocity Racing Development's Nikita Johnson moved to GB3, where he joined Hitech Grand Prix, while also taking on a part-time Indy NXT campaign with HMD Motorsports. To replace him, VRD promoted Max Taylor after he won the USF Juniors title and came third in USF2000 in 2024 with the team. Eurocup-3 race winner Owen Tangavelou also joined the team for the opening two rounds of the season.

TJ Speed Motorsports took on three new drivers for their three cars. The No. 27 car previously occupied by Hunter Yeany before his mid-season departure was piloted by Formula Regional Japanese runner-up Sebastian Manson on his USFP2000 debut. Turn 3-bound Cooper Becklin, who spent the second half of the 2024 season in the team's No. 28 car, was replaced by Ariel Elkin, who jumped up from USF Juniors after finishing the 2024 season in fourth driving for International Motorsport. Liam Sceats joined HMD Motorsports for a part-time Indy NXT campaign, and USF2000 driver Evagoras Papasavvas was initially announced to replace him in the No. 28 car. Ahead of the season opener, Jace Denmark was instead announced to be the third driver in TJ Speed's lineup, returning to USFP2000 where he finished third in 2024 with Papst Racing after being unable to secure a drive in Indy NXT.

With BN Racing not entering the 2025 season, three of their four drivers left the championship in Nicolás Baptiste, Ricardo Escotto - who joined Andretti Cape in Indy NXT - and Arturo Flores, while Alessandro de Tullio moved to Turn 3 Motorsport.

Jay Howard Driver Development saw Frankie Mossman return for a second season. Tanner DeFabis, who raced for the team at the 2024 season finale, remained with the team for a part-time campaign, entering the events at St. Petersburg, Indianapolis and IRP.

DEForce Racing saw Mac Clark leave the team to join Exclusive Autosport.

Exclusive Autosport, who did not have a full-time driver in 2024 after Braden Eves had to end his campaign early due to budget issues, had three new drivers in 2025. The team promoted two USF2000 drivers to its lineup in Joey Brienza, who came fifth in 2024, also with Exclusive Autosport, and Carson Etter, who came 16th with DC Autosport. Mac Clark completed the team's lineup, embarking on his second year in the series after finishing his 2024 campaign with DEForce Racing in eleventh despite missing the final two races.

==== Mid-season changes ====
Turn 3 Motorsport only ran three cars at NOLA Motorsports Park, with Titus Sherlock and Elliot Cox both leaving the team. For the third round at Indianapolis, they were replaced by Brady Golan, who stepped up from the USF2000 Championship, and DEForce Racing driver Nicholas Monteiro respectively. Velocity Racing Development also welcomed a new driver in Frankie Mossman, who departed Jay Howard Driver Development to replace Owen Tangavelou for the remainder of the season. Tangavelou in turn moved to DEForce Racing for the Indianapolis event.

Comet/NCMP Racing's Logan Adams and VRD's Frankie Mossmann both skipped the oval event at Lucas Oil Indianapolis Raceway Park.

Adams and Mossmann returned for the Grand Prix of Road America, while Golan was absent and both DeFabis and Denmark had to end their seasons early due to budget issues. The latter two were not replaced by their teams, leading to JHDD fielding no cars for the weekend, while Golan's No. 3 Turn 3 Motorsport was piloted by ex-FIA F3 driver and series debutant Joseph Loake.

JHDD returned to the championship at Mid-Ohio after announcing that Nick Gilkes would take over the team's No. 7 car for that and the following event. Turn 3 Motorsport saw Loake depart as Golan returned to the team, while Charles Finelli ended his 2025 campaign ahead of the Grand Prix of Mid-Ohio.

Ahead of the Grand Prix of Toronto, JHDD announced that Liam McNeilly would make his series debut in Canada, returning the USF Pro ladder after winning the first five races of the 2025 USF2000 Championship before being forced out of competition due to visa issues.

JHDD did not enter any cars at Portland as McNeilly and Gilkes were both absent, while both Logan Adams and Nicholas Monteiro also missed the season final, with the latter stepping up to Indy NXT with HMD Motorsports. TJ Speed meanwhile saw the series debut of AFO competitor Miles Bromley in the No. 26 car previously piloted by Denmark.

== Schedule ==
The 2025 schedule was revealed on September 17, 2024. The championship visited the same eight circuits as it did in 2024: two street circuits, five road courses and one oval. All rounds except the weekends at NOLA and Indianapolis Raceway Park ran in support of the IndyCar Series.

Icon	Legend
O	Oval/Speedway
R	Road course
S	Street circuit

Rd.	Date	Race name	Track	Location
1	February 28 – March 2	Andersen Interior Contracting Grand Prix of St. Petersburg	S Streets of St. Petersburg	St. Petersburg, Florida
2	February 28 – March 2	Andersen Interior Contracting Grand Prix of St. Petersburg	S Streets of St. Petersburg	St. Petersburg, Florida
3	April 11–13	Continental Tire Grand Prix of Louisiana	R NOLA Motorsports Park	Avondale, Louisiana
4	April 11–13	Continental Tire Grand Prix of Louisiana	R NOLA Motorsports Park	Avondale, Louisiana
5	April 11–13	Continental Tire Grand Prix of Louisiana	R NOLA Motorsports Park	Avondale, Louisiana
6	May 8–10	VP Racing Grand Prix of Indianapolis	R Indianapolis Motor Speedway Road Course	Speedway, Indiana
7	May 8–10	VP Racing Grand Prix of Indianapolis	R Indianapolis Motor Speedway Road Course	Speedway, Indiana
8	May 8–10	VP Racing Grand Prix of Indianapolis	R Indianapolis Motor Speedway Road Course	Speedway, Indiana
9	May 22–23	Continental Tire Freedom 90	O Lucas Oil Indianapolis Raceway Park	Brownsburg, Indiana
10	June 19–22	Elite Engines Grand Prix of Road America	R Road America	Elkhart Lake, Wisconsin
11	June 19–22	Elite Engines Grand Prix of Road America	R Road America	Elkhart Lake, Wisconsin
12	June 19–22	Elite Engines Grand Prix of Road America	R Road America	Elkhart Lake, Wisconsin
13	July 3–6	PFC Grand Prix of Mid-Ohio	R Mid-Ohio Sports Car Course	Lexington, Ohio
14	July 3–6	PFC Grand Prix of Mid-Ohio	R Mid-Ohio Sports Car Course	Lexington, Ohio
15	July 18–20	Continental Tire Grand Prix of Toronto	S Exhibition Place	Toronto, Ontario
16	July 18–20	Continental Tire Grand Prix of Toronto	S Exhibition Place	Toronto, Ontario
17	August 7–10	Continental Tire Grand Prix of Portland	R Portland International Raceway	Portland, Oregon
18	August 7–10	Continental Tire Grand Prix of Portland	R Portland International Raceway	Portland, Oregon

== Race results ==
Rd.	Track	Pole position	Fastest lap	Most laps led	Race winner	
Rd.	Track	Pole position	Fastest lap	Most laps led	Driver	Team
1	(United States) Streets of St. Petersburg	(United States) Alessandro de Tullio	(United States) Alessandro de Tullio	(United States) Alessandro de Tullio	(United States) Alessandro de Tullio	Turn 3 Motorsport
2	(United States) Streets of St. Petersburg	(United States) Alessandro de Tullio	(United States) Max Garcia	(United States) Max Garcia	(United States) Max Garcia	Pabst Racing
3	(United States) NOLA Motorsports Park	(United States) Max Garcia	(United States) Max Garcia	(United States) Alessandro de Tullio	(United States) Alessandro de Tullio	Turn 3 Motorsport
4	(United States) NOLA Motorsports Park	(United States) Alessandro de Tullio	(Israel) Ariel Elkin	(United States) Alessandro de Tullio	(United States) Alessandro de Tullio	Turn 3 Motorsport
5	(United States) NOLA Motorsports Park	(United States) Max Garcia	(New Zealand) Jacob Douglas	(United States) Max Garcia	(United States) Max Garcia	Pabst Racing
6	(United States) Indianapolis Motor Speedway Road Course	(Israel) Ariel Elkin	(United States) Max Garcia	(Israel) Ariel Elkin	(Israel) Ariel Elkin	TJ Speed Motorsports
7	(United States) Indianapolis Motor Speedway Road Course	(Israel) Ariel Elkin	(United States) Alessandro de Tullio	(Israel) Ariel Elkin	(New Zealand) Jacob Douglas	Pabst Racing
8	(United States) Indianapolis Motor Speedway Road Course	(Israel) Ariel Elkin	(New Zealand) Jacob Douglas	(Israel) Ariel Elkin	(Israel) Ariel Elkin	TJ Speed Motorsports
9	(United States) Lucas Oil Indianapolis Raceway Park	(Canada) Mac Clark	(Israel) Ariel Elkin	(Israel) Ariel Elkin	(Israel) Ariel Elkin	TJ Speed Motorsports
10	(United States) Road America	(United States) Max Garcia	(United States) Max Garcia	(United States) Max Garcia	(United States) Max Garcia	Pabst Racing
11	(United States) Road America	(United States) Max Garcia	(United States) Max Garcia	(United States) Max Garcia	(United States) Max Garcia	Pabst Racing
12	(United States) Road America	(United States) Max Garcia	(United States) Max Garcia	(United States) Max Taylor	(United States) Max Taylor	Velocity Racing Development
13	(United States) Mid-Ohio Sports Car Course	(United States) Max Garcia	(United States) Max Garcia	(United States) Max Garcia	(United States) Max Garcia	Pabst Racing
14	(United States) Mid-Ohio Sports Car Course	(United States) Max Garcia	(United States) Max Garcia	(United States) Max Garcia	(United States) Max Garcia	Pabst Racing
15	(Canada) Exhibition Place	(United States) Max Garcia	(United States) Max Garcia	(United States) Max Garcia	(United States) Max Garcia	Pabst Racing
16	(Canada) Exhibition Place	(United States) Alessandro de Tullio	(United States) Max Garcia	(United States) Frankie Mossman	(United States) Alessandro de Tullio	Turn 3 Motorsport
17	(United States) Portland International Raceway	(United States) Frankie Mossman	(United States) Max Garcia	(United States) Max Garcia	(United States) Max Garcia	Pabst Racing
18	(United States) Portland International Raceway	(United States) Max Garcia	(United States) Max Garcia	(United States) Max Garcia	(United States) Max Garcia	Pabst Racing

== Season report ==
=== First half ===
St. Petersburg hosted the season-opening double-header for the 2025 USF Pro 2000 Championship, and Turn 3 Motorsport’s Alessandro de Tullio claimed pole position for both races. He spent the first race resisting attacks from Pabst Racing’s Max Garcia throughout three caution periods and subsequent restarts, with the pair colliding on Garcia’s final attack. Still, de Tullio was able to hold on and win the race, while Pabst’s Michael Costello was handed third after a penalty for Exclusive Autosport’s Mac Clark. Race two saw de Tullio initially continue defending his lead, but this time, Garcia and Clark were able to both pass him on a restart. De Tullio then fell behind VRD’s Max Taylor before crashing into the Turn 4 barriers. Garcia secured victory and with it the lead in the standings, with Clark second and Pabst’s Jacob Douglas completing the podium after a penalty for Taylor.

NOLA Motorsports Park hosted the next three races, and Garcia claimed pole position for race one despite suspension damage late in qualifying, while de Tullio topped the second session to secure race two pole as Garcia’s second-best lap put him on pole for race three. In the opening race, Garcia held the lead at the start but was passed by de Tullio on lap two, and although he closed back in during the second half of the race he was unable to attempt a move. De Tullio therefore took victory in the series’ 350th race, ahead of Garcia and Clark. He then went on to control race two from pole, resisting pressure from Garcia. TJ Speed Motorsports’ Ariel Elkin, who had started in sixth, charged through the field to third, briefly challenging for second before settling for the final podium spot. The third race saw Garcia defend the lead from Douglas, Taylor and de Tullio at the start, with a brief caution triggered by Clark’s stoppage bunching up the field. Garcia held firm under late pressure from de Tullio to secure his second win of the year, while Taylor in third took his maiden podium. The Louisiana triple-header saw Garcia extend his championship lead to 141 points, 16 clear of de Tullio, with Douglas in third.

At Indianapolis Motor Speedway’s road course, TJ Speed’s Ariel Elkin secured his maiden series pole for the opening race, with points leader Garcia in fourth. Race one featured several caution periods: Douglas briefly led after an early restart before slowing with issues, handing first place back to Elkin, who held off Clark for his first USFP2000 win. Garcia recovered to third to further extend his championship lead. In race two, Elkin again started from pole and initially led under multiple cautions, but a late clash between Taylor and Elkin allowed Douglas to take his first series victory ahead of Clark and Garcia. The chaotic finale saw Taylor, Douglas, and de Tullio all collide in turn one. Garcia was able to avoid the incident and challenge Elkin, but the Israeli repelled his attacks to claim a second win of the weekend. Turn 3 Motorsport’s Cooper Becklin rose from 11th to finish second, with Costello completing the podium as a drive-through penalty for VRD’s Frankie Mossman and further incidents reshuffled the order. Garcia salvaged fourth, narrowly behind Costello, to end the weekend with a further extended points advantage of 57 points over de Tullio, with Elkin a further two points behind.

The campaign’s sole oval race at IRP closed off the first half of the season. Clark narrowly beat Elkin to pole position by 0.005 seconds. In the 90-lap race, Elkin took the lead on lap two around the outside and gapped Clark, who then fell behind de Tullio at a mid-race restart. De Tullio also had no answer to Elkin’s pace and followed him home in second. Points leader Garcia came fourth, minimizing the damage to his points lead. Elkin’s victory saw him move past de Tullio to second in the standings, 41 points behind Garcia.

=== Second half ===
Garcia claimed pole position for all three races held at Road America, while his closest competitor Elkin suffered electrical issues in qualifying, dropping him down the order. Garcia converted pole into victory in race one, comfortably leading throughout as Clark and Douglas completed the podium. Alessandro de Tullio rose to fourth ahead of Turn 3’s debutant Joseph Loake, while Elkin recovered to seventh after starting 17th. Race two followed a similar pattern as Garcia again led from pole, briefly losing out to Douglas after a restart but quickly reclaiming control to notch his second win of the weekend. Clark finished second before a post-race penalty dropped him to third behind Douglas, while Elkin completed the top four after a strong drive through the pack. The final race produced more drama, as Taylor claimed his maiden series victory after a decisive outside move on Garcia following an early caution. Clark briefly challenged at the front before finishing runner-up, while Garcia was shuffled down to fourth behind Elkin after going off in a late battle with Taylor. Three podiums saw Clark take second place in the standings, but two wins meant Garcia now had a 72-point championship lead.

Garcia secured two more pole positions at Mid-Ohio. He then dominated race one, leading every lap despite an early caution triggered by contact between DEForce Racing’s Jorge Garciarce and Comet/NCMP’s Logan Adams. Elkin resisted pressure from Taylor and de Tullio to finish second, while Douglas completed the top five. Clark’s race unraveled after a clash sent him spinning down the order, and although he recovered to 11th, he lost second place in the standings to Elkin. Race two was a near-repeat, with Garcia again unchallenged as he pulled clear from Douglas to win by almost 10 seconds. Clark climbed into third after passing Mossman, but lacked the pace to match the Pabst Racing pair, while Elkin finished fifth behind Mossman. Garcia’s weekend sweep extended his championship advantage to 97 points over Elkin, with Clark a further nine points back.

Qualifying around Exhibition Place saw Garcia notch pole position for race one, while de Tullio topped the grid for race two. Garcia led every lap of the opening contest, surviving two safety car interruptions to clinch victory and the championship title with three races to spare. Douglas passed Taylor for second place after the second restart, with Taylor later disqualified for his car failing the post-race technical inspection and Clark inheriting third. Race two saw de Tullio start from pole but lose the lead to Mossman on lap six, before reclaiming it with a last-lap move that secured his first win of the season. Mossman had to settle for second, while Douglas claimed third after JHDD’s Liam McNeilly lost a podium finish in just his second race to a penalty. With two races remaining, Elkin and Clark were now only separated by three points in their fight for the runner-up spot.

The season concluded at Portland with Mossmann and Garcia sharing pole positions in qualifying. The former started the first race with a lockup into the first corner, allowing Garcia to vault from third to the lead by turn two. After an early caution, Garcia was able to break clear. Clark secured second ahead of Mossman, who resisted late pressure from Taylor to secure a second consecutive podium. Garcia then controlled proceedings in the second race despite two early caution periods. Clark’s challenge for the win ended with front wing damage in turn one, while de Tullio ran second ahead of Elkin. Garcia pulled away to win by nearly seven seconds, with Douglas taking third after a late pass on Elkin, who secured the runner-up spot in the standings. De Tullio’s second place lifted him to fourth in the standings, as Garcia ended the year with nine wins and 495 points.

Sixteen-year-old rookie Garcia delivered a commanding campaign, clinching the championship with three races to spare before closing the year with a Portland double to equal Kyle Kirkwood’s 2019 single-season record of nine wins. Garcia opened his account with victory in St. Petersburg and quickly established himself as the benchmark, adding further triumphs at NOLA, Road America, Mid-Ohio and Toronto while only finishing outside the top five on one single occasion. Consistency and speed in qualifying were also key, as he notched nine pole positions across the season. Behind him, Elkin emerged as his closest challenger after victories at Indianapolis and on the IRP oval, but a difficult second half left him fighting for second with Clark while Garcia pulled away.

== Championship standings ==
=== Drivers' Championship ===
Scoring system

Position	**1st**	**2nd**	**3rd**	**4th**	**5th**	**6th**	**7th**	**8th**	**9th**	**10th**	**11th**	**12th**	**13th**	**14th**	**15th**	**16th**	**17th**	**18th**	**19th**	**20th+**
Points	30	25	22	19	17	15	14	13	12	11	10	9	8	7	6	5	4	3	2	1
Points (O)	45	38	33	29	26	23	21	20	18	17	15	14	12	11	9	8	6	5	3	2

- The driver who qualified on pole was awarded one additional point.
- One point was awarded to the driver who led the most laps in a race.
- One point was awarded to the driver who set the fastest lap during the race.

Pos	Driver	STP		NOL			IMS			IRP	ROA			MOH		TOR		POR		Points
1	(United States) Max Garcia	2	1*	**2**	2	**1***	4	3	4	4	**1***	**1***	**4**	**1***	**1***	**1***	9	1*	**1***	495
2	(Israel) Ariel Elkin	18	DNS	5	3	5	**1***	**5***	**1***	1*	7	4	3	2	5	10	5	8	4	347
3	(Canada) Mac Clark	4	2	3	17	18	2	2	5	**3**	2	3	2	10	3	3	10	2	12	346
4	(United States) Alessandro de Tullio	**1***	**18**	1*	**1***	2	15	9	20	2	4	6	5	4	7	17	**1**	6	2	342
5	(New Zealand) Jacob Douglas	20	3	4	4	4	14	1	17	9	3	2	8	5	2	2	3	5	3	329
6	(United States) Max Taylor	5	4	7	5	3	3	13	19	8	8	5	1*	3	8	DSQ	19	4	11	268
7	(United States) Michael Costello	3	21	6	6	6	5	20	3	7	18	18	9	14	6	15	6	7	14	211
8	(United States) Frankie Mossman	21	10	12	7	14	13	10	13		9	7	17	16	4	4	2*	**3**	9	203
9	(United States) Cooper Becklin	6	16	13	16	8	9	16	2	12	13	11	10	8	9	11	8	11	13	197
10	(Brazil) Nicholas Monteiro	7	13	15	15	10	6	6	6	6	17	12	6	6	15	12	7			185
11	(United States) Joey Brienza	13	11	8	12	16	11	7	10	18	6	10	12	7	14	7	16	10	10	182
12	(New Zealand) Sebastian Manson	19	8	16	13	11	8	21	7	14	12	17	13	9	16	16	18	9	5	152
13	(United States) Tyke Durst	14	19	10	14	17	10	14	11	15	14	15	11	15	10	8	14	13	8	149
14	(Mexico) Jorge Garciarce	12	9	14	8	13	21	11	18	17	11	13	7	18	DNS	6	12	15	7	148
15	(United States) Logan Adams	9	17	11	10	12	20	12	16		10	9	14	12	13	14	11			125
16	(United States) Jace Denmark	8	6	9	11	7	7	4	15	11										118
17	(United States) Carson Etter	15	12	17	18	19	17	18	12	13	15	14	15	13	12	18	17	14	6	117
18	(United States) Brady Golan						16	19	21	5				11	11	9	13	12	15	89
19	(Vietnam) Owen Tangavelou	11	5	19	9	9	18	15	9											74
20	(United States) Tanner DeFabis	10	7				19	8	8	10										70
21	(United States) Charles Finelli	16	14	18	19	15	12	17	14	16	16	16	16							66
22	(United Kingdom) Liam McNeilly															5	4			36
23	(United Kingdom) Joseph Loake										5	8	18							33
24	(Canada) Nick Gilkes													17	17	13	15			22
25	(Australia) Miles Bromley																	16	16	10
26	(United States) Titus Sherlock	22	15																	7
27	(United States) Elliot Cox	17	20																	5
Pos	Driver	STP		NOL			IMS			IRP	ROA			MOH		TOR		POR		Points

Color	Result
Gold	Winner
Silver	2nd place
Bronze	3rd place
Green	4th & 5th place
Light Blue	6th–10th place
Dark Blue	Finished (Outside Top 10)
Purple	Did not finish
Red	Did not qualify (DNQ)
Brown	Withdrawn (Wth)
Black	Disqualified (DSQ)
White	Did not start (DNS)
Blank	Did not participate

**In-line notation**
**Bold**	Pole position (1 point)
Italics	Ran fastest race lap (1 point)
*	Led most race laps (1 point); Not awarded if more than one driver led most laps
Rookie

=== Teams' championship ===
Scoring system

Position	**1st**	**2nd**	**3rd**	**4th**	**5th**	**6th**	**7th**	**8th**	**9th**	**10th+**
Points	22	18	15	12	10	8	6	4	2	1

- Single car teams received 3 bonus points as an equivalency to multi-car teams.
- Only the best two results counted for teams fielding more than two entries.

Pos	Team	STP		NOL			IMS			IRP	ROA			MOH		TOR		POR		Points
1	Pabst Racing	2	1	2	2	1	4	1	3	4	1	1	4	1	1	1	2	1	1	567
1	Pabst Racing	3	3	4	4	4	5	3	4	7	3	2	8	5	2	2	6	5	3	567
2	Turn 3 Motorsport	1	14	1	1	2	6	6	2	2	4	6	5	4	6	8	1	6	2	328
2	Turn 3 Motorsport	6	15	9	12	7	8	9	6	5	5	8	6	6	8	9	7	10	8	328
3	TJ Speed Motorsports	8	6	5	3	5	1	4	1	1	7	4	3	2	5	10	8	7	4	281
3	TJ Speed Motorsports	15	8	8	10	6	7	5	7	9	12	13	10	8	11	13	12	8	5	281
4	Exclusive Autosport	4	2	3	11	14	2	2	5	3	2	3	2	7	3	3	9	2	6	270
4	Exclusive Autosport	13	11	7	14	15	9	7	10	10	6	10	9	9	9	7	11	9	10	270
5	Velocity Racing Development	5	4	6	5	3	3	10	11	6	8	5	1	3	4	4	3	3	9	244
5	Velocity Racing Development	11	5	15	8	8	11	13	15		9	7	13	11	7	DSQ	5	4	11	244
6	Jay Howard Driver Development	10	7	11	6	12	13	8	8	8				12	12	5	4			85
6	Jay Howard Driver Development	16	10													11	14			85
7	DEForce Racing	7	9	12	7	9	12	12	9	12	11	11	7	13	DNS	6	13	11	7	82
7	DEForce Racing	12	12	13	13	11	15	14	14											82
8	Comet/NCMP Racing	9	16	10	9	10	14	11	13		10	9	11	10	10	12	10			64
9	FatBoy Racing!	14	13	14	15	13	10	15	12	11	13	12	12							48
Pos	Team	STP		NOL			IMS			IRP	ROA			MOH		TOR		POR		Points

== See also ==
- 2025 IndyCar Series
- 2025 Indy NXT
- 2025 USF2000 Championship
- 2025 USF Juniors
