= Alessandro de Tullio =

Argentinian and American racing driver (born 2006)

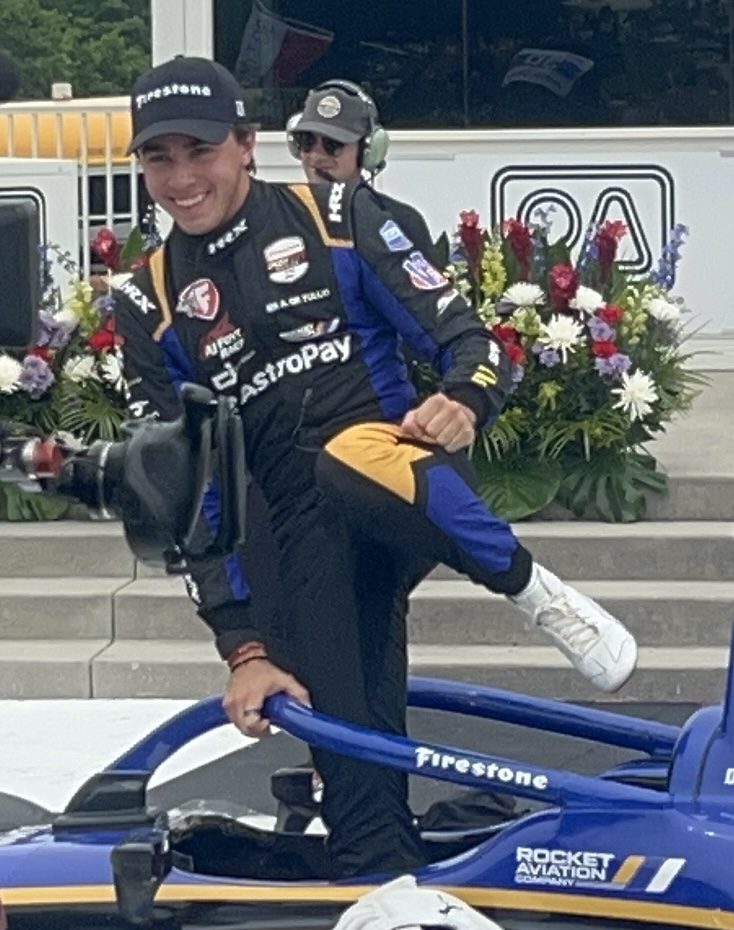
- de Tullio at Road America in 2026
- Nationality: (Argentina) Argentinian (United States) American
- Born: June 20, 2006 (age 20) Miami, Florida, U.S.

Indy NXT career
- Debut season: 2026
- Current team: Chip Ganassi Racing
- Car number: 10
- Former teams: A. J. Foyt Racing
- Starts: 17
- Wins: 2
- Podiums: 4
- Poles: 8
- Fastest laps: 2
- Best finish: 6th in 2026

Previous series
- 2024–2025 2022: USF Pro 2000 Championship; USF Juniors

Alessandro de Tullio (born June 20, 2006) is an Argentinian, American and Italian racing driver who currently competes in the Indy NXT with Chip Ganassi Racing.

De Tullio previously raced with A. J. Foyt Racing in INDY NXT, finshing sixth in the 2026 championship. He also raced in the 2025 USF Pro 2000 Championship with Turn 3 Motorsport, placing fourth overall.

== Career ==
=== USF Pro 2000 Championship ===
De Tullio won his first victory on the Virginia International Raceway circuit, winning all three races that weekend. At the end of the 2022 season, he finished fourth in the overall standings, having won five races.

=== USF Pro 2000 Championship ===
After a season finale for the BN Racing team in the 2024 season, on December 13, 2024, Turn 3 Motorsport team announced that it had signed de Tullio for the 2025 season of the USF Pro 2000 Championship. In the first race of the 2025 season, on the Streets of St. Petersburg circuit, de Tullio won the first race of the season and the first of USF Pro 2000.

=== Indy NXT ===
==== 2026 ====
In 2026, de Tullio move up to Indy NXT with A. J. Foyt Racing. He won at Barber. Following the second race at Road America, de Tullio and teammate Nicholas Monteiro were disqualified due to tire violations; de Tullio had originally won the race. He finished the season sixth in the championship standings, grabbing another race win at Portland and scoring eight pole positions, one shy of the series record.

==== 2027 ====
On November 11, 2026, Chip Ganassi Racing announced de Tullio as the driver of its No. 10 INDY NXT car beginning in 2027, with a reserve driver role for IndyCar road and street courses.

== Karting record ==
=== Karting career summary ===
Season	Series	Team	Position
2014	Florida Winter Tour - Micro Max	JC	8th
2016	SKUSA SuperNationals XX - Mini Swift		9th
2017	Florida Winter Tour - Mini ROK		8th
2018	Florida Winter Tour - Junior ROK		8th
2019	Florida Winter Tour - Junior ROK	AM Racing Team	5th
2019	ROK the Rio - Junior ROK	AM Racing Team	4th
2019	Biloxi ROK Fest - Junior ROK	AM Engines	7th
2020	SKUSA Winter Series - X30 Junior		5th
2020	Florida Winter Tour - Junior ROK	AM Racing Team	14th
2022	SKUSA SuperNationals XXV - X30 Senior	Parolin USA	6th
2023	SKUSA SuperNationals XXVI - X30 Senior	International Motorsport	7th
2024	SKUSA SuperNationals XXVII - X30 Senior	Inter MS	7th

== Racing record ==
=== Racing career summary ===
Season	Series	Team	Races	Wins	Poles	F/Laps	Podiums	Points	Position
2022	USF Juniors	Velocity Racing Development	15	5	0	5	9	314	4th
2024	USF Pro 2000 Championship	BN Racing	6	0	0	0	0	66	20th
2025	USF Pro 2000 Championship	Turn 3 Motorsport	18	4	4	2	7	342	4th
2026	Indy NXT	A. J. Foyt Racing	17	2	8	3	4	442	6th
2027	Indy NXT	Chip Ganassi Racing							
2027	IndyCar Series	Chip Ganassi Racing	Reserve driver						

^{*} Season still in progress.

=== American open–wheel racing results ===
==== USF Juniors ====
(key) (Races in bold indicate pole position) (Races in italics indicate fastest lap) (Races with * indicate most race laps led)

Year	Team	1	2	3	4	5	6	7	8	9	10	11	12	13	14	15	16	17	Rank	Points
2022	Velocity Racing Development	OIR; 1; 6	OIR; 2; 2	OIR; 3 C†	ALA; 1; 4	ALA; 2 DNS	VIR; 1; 1	VIR; 2; 1	VIR; 3; 1*	MOH; 1; 3	MOH; 2; 1	MOH; 3; 3	ROA; 1; 2	ROA; 2 DSQ	ROA; 3; 1	COA; 1; 10	COA; 2; 14	COA; 3; 9	4th	314

† Race was cancelled due to inclement weather.

==== USF Pro 2000 Championship ====
(key) (Races in bold indicate pole position) (Races in italics indicate fastest lap)

Year	Team	1	2	3	4	5	6	7	8	9	10	11	12	13	14	15	16	17	18	Position	Points
2024	BN Racing	STP; 1	STP; 2	LOU; 1	LOU; 2	LOU; 3	IMS; 1	IMS; 2	IMS; 3	IRP	ROA; 1	ROA; 2	ROA; 3	MOH; 1; 11	MOH; 2; 10	TOR; 1; 4	TOR; 2; 15	POR; 1; 8	POR; 2; 14	20th	66
2025	Turn 3 Motorsport	**STP**; **1**; 1*	**STP**; **2**; 18	LOU; 1; 1*	**LOU**; **2**; 1*	LOU; 3; 2	IMS; 1; 15	IMS; 2; 9	IMS; 3; 20	IRP; 2	ROA; 1; 4	ROA; 2; 6	ROA; 3; 5	MOH; 1; 4	MOH; 2; 7	TOR; 1; 17	**TOR**; **2**; 1	POR; 1; 6	POR; 2; 2	4th	342

==== Indy NXT ====
(key) (Races in bold indicate pole position) (Races in italics indicate fastest lap) (Races with ^{L} indicate a race lap led) (Races with * indicate most race laps led)

Year	Team	1	2	3	4	5	6	7	8	9	10	11	12	13	14	15	16	17	Rank	Points
2026	A. J. Foyt Racing	STP; 10	**ARL**; 11	**BAR**; 20*	**BAR**; 1*	**IMS**; 9	IMS; 5	**DET**; 22	GAT; 2	**ROA**; 3	**ROA**; 23*	MOH; 6	MOH; 8	NSS; 9	**POR**; 1*	MIL; 6	LAG; 18	LAG; 8	6th	442

* Season still in progress.
