= Owen Tangavelou =

Vietnamese racing driver (born 2005)

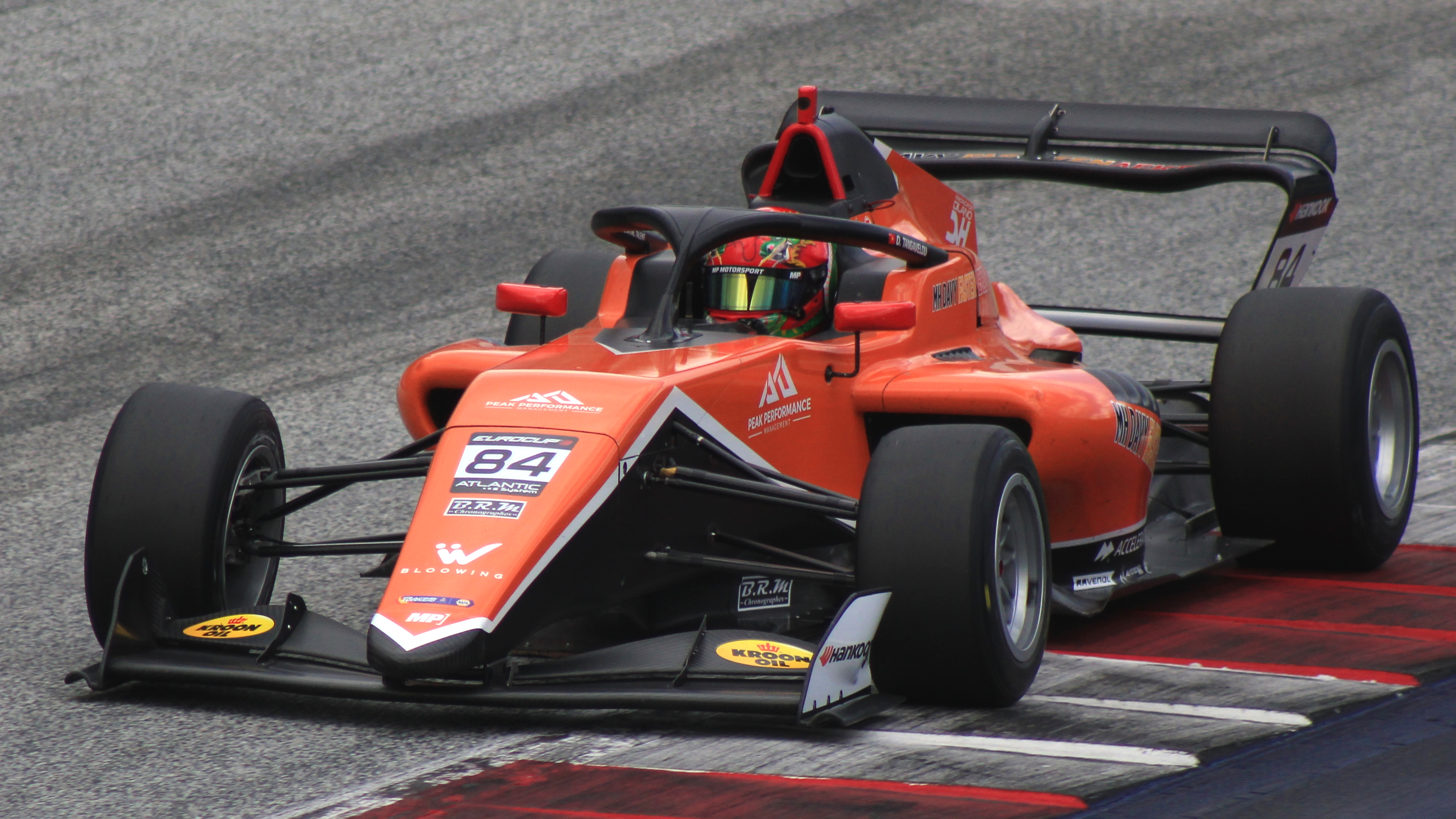
- Tangavelou racing in the 2024 Eurocup-3 season at the Red Bull Ring.
- Nationality: (Vietnam) Vietnamese; (France) French (Note: Tangavelou competed under a French racing licence until 2023. He currently represents Vietnam.)
- Born: Nguyễn Owen Tangavelou; 4 March 2005 (age 21) Clamart, France

USF Pro 2000 Championship career
- Debut season: 2025
- Categorisation: FIA Silver
- Car number: 84
- Former teams: DEForce Racing; Velocity Racing Development
- Starts: 5 (5 entries)

Previous series
- 2024 2023 2022–2023 2022 2020–2021: Eurocup-3; FR Middle East Championship; FR European Championship; FR Asian Championship; French F4 Championship

Nguyễn Owen Tangavelou (born 4 March 2005) is a French-Vietnamese racing driver who last competed in the USF Pro 2000 Championship and Eurocup-3.

Tangavelou began competitive kart racing at the age of 14 and stepped up to single-seaters a year later. He competed in French F4 and FRECA for two years each, before winning on his Eurocup-3 debut in 2024 for MP Motorsport. He moved to the United States in 2025, racing in USF Pro 2000 for Velocity Racing Development and later DEForce Racing.

== Career ==
=== Karting ===
Tangavelou began his motorsport career in karting at the relatively late age of fourteen in France. He raced in several regional competitions before stepping up to Formula 4.

=== Formula 4 ===
==== 2020 ====
In 2020, Tangavelou made his car racing debut in the French F4 Championship. Due to a lack of testing prior to the season, as well as him stating that he had "not enough experience" in racing at the time, the Vietnamese driver finished 12th in the championship with a best race result of fifth place at Le Castellet.

==== 2021 ====
Tangavelou remained in French F4 for 2021. The Vietnamese driver started his season out strongly with his first podium in single-seaters at the opening race in Nogaro. He scored a further podium later in the season in the reversed-grid race at the Circuit Paul Ricard and finished fifth in the standings, having also set two fastest laps. In the FIA standings of the championship, Tangavelou also finished fifth, with a total of nine podiums, including three third places at the Hungaroring.

=== Formula Regional ===
==== 2022 ====
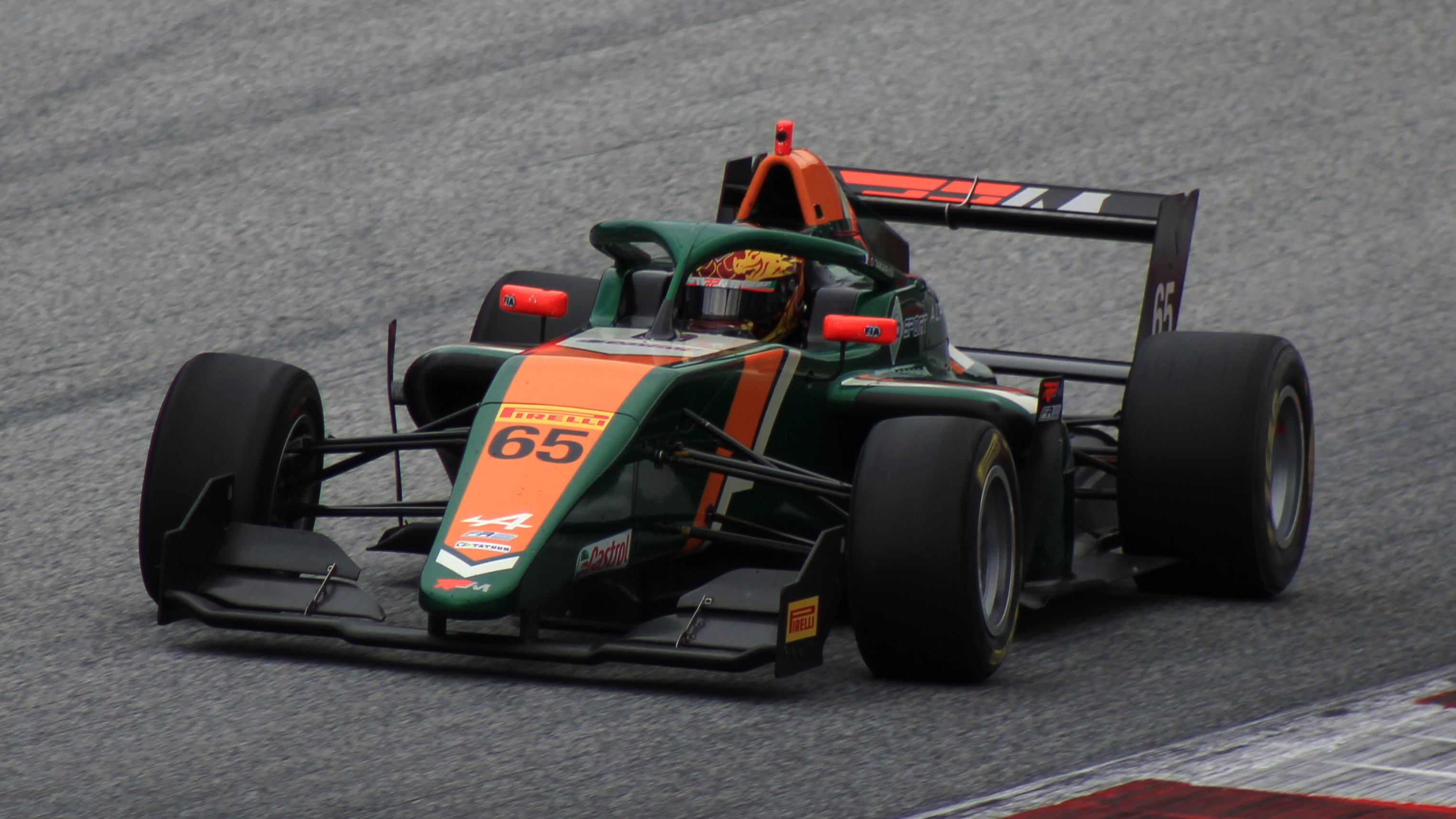
Tangavelou racing in the 2022 Formula Regional European Championship at the Red Bull Ring.

Moving into 2022, Tangavelou made his debut in the Formula Regional category by racing in the final three rounds of the Formula Regional Asian Championship with Hitech Grand Prix. He had a best finish of 13th in the final race, one in which he scored a rookie podium, and ended up 31st in the standings.

Tangavelou's main series that year would be the Formula Regional European Championship, which he would contest with G4 Racing. Following the first half of the season, which yielded a best finish of 14th at Le Castellet, Tangavelou switched to the RPM team to partner Pietro Delli Guanti. His results would improve almost instantly, with him getting his first points at the Hungaroring and scoring two further ninth places at the next round in Spa-Francorchamps. Another point came at the Red Bull Ring, before Tangavelou scored a season-best finish of sixth place at the season finale in Mugello, thereby taking the rookie victory within that race, which elevated him to twentieth in the standings.

==== 2023 ====
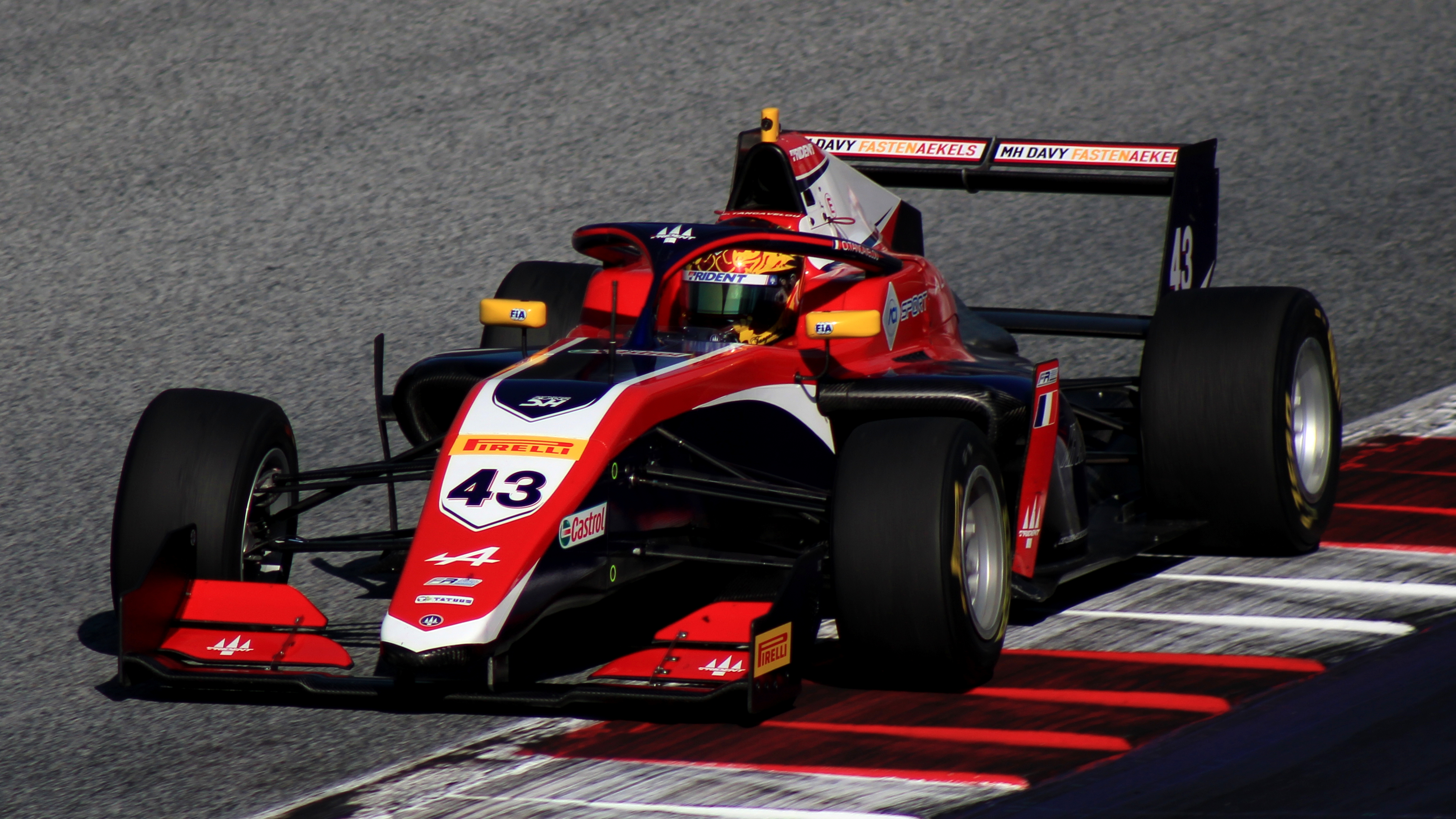
Tangavelou racing in the 2023 Formula Regional European Championship at the Red Bull Ring.

In 2023, Tangavelou moved to Trident for his second season in the series. He finished 14th in the championship, achieving two top-five finishes and seven top-ten results.

==== 2024 ====
To represent his family living in Vietnam, Tangavelou decided to compete under a Vietnamese licence from 2024 onwards. After spending two seasons in FRECA, Tangavelou switched to the Eurocup-3 championship for the 2024 season, driving for MP Motorsport. Tangavelou finished third in the Eurocup-3 Winter Series with one podium. In the main championship, he took a win at the Red Bull Ring, three poles, three podiums and nine top-five finishes en route to fourth in the standings.

==== 2025 ====
Tangavelou returned to Eurocup-3 in 2025 with Drivex for the third round in Paul Ricard, where he had a best finish of eleventh. He returned the next round in Monza, moving over to Allay Racing where he once again had a best finish of eleventh.

At the end of 2025, Tangavelou joined Saintéloc Racing to race in the FIA FR World Cup at Macau. He became the first Vietnamese driver to race at the event. He qualified 21st and finished 17th.

=== USF Pro 2000 ===
Tangavelou transitioned over to the USF Pro 2000 Championship for 2025, racing with Velocity Racing Development in his first season outside of Europe. He made a strong debut, finishing fifth in the second race at St. Petersburg. In early May, it was announced that Tangavelou would join DEForce Racing at the Indianapolis Motor Speedway and Road America events.

== Racing record ==
=== Racing career summary ===
Season	Series	Team	Races	Wins	Poles	F/Laps	Podiums	Points	Position
2020	French F4 Championship	FFSA Academy	20	0	0	0	0	28	12th
2021	French F4 Championship	FFSA Academy	20	0	0	2	2	160	5th
2022	Formula Regional Asian Championship	Hitech Grand Prix	9	0	0	0	0	0	31st
2022	Formula Regional European Championship	G4 Racing	9	0	0	0	0	15	20th
2022	Formula Regional European Championship	RPM	9	0	0	0	0	15	20th
2023	Formula Regional Middle East Championship	Hyderabad Blackbirds by MP Motorsport	3	0	0	0	0	0	33rd
2023	Formula Regional European Championship	Trident	20	0	0	0	0	43	14th
2024	Eurocup-3 Winter Series	MP Motorsport	2	0	0	0	1	27	**3rd**
2024	Eurocup-3	MP Motorsport	15	1	3	1	3	158	4th
2025	USF Pro 2000 Championship	Velocity Racing Development	5	0	0	0	0	74	19th
2025	USF Pro 2000 Championship	DEForce Racing	3	0	0	0	0	74	19th
2025	Eurocup-3	DXR	3	0	0	0	0	0	22nd
2025	Eurocup-3	Allay Racing	2	0	0	0	0	0	22nd
2025	Macau Grand Prix	Saintéloc Racing	1	0	0	0	0	—N/a	17th

* Season still in progress.

=== Complete French F4 Championship results ===
(key) (Races in bold indicate pole position) (Races in italics indicate fastest lap)

Year	1	2	3	4	5	6	7	8	9	10	11	12	13	14	15	16	17	18	19	20	21	Pos	Points
2020	NOG; 1; 12	NOG; 2; 13	NOG; 3; 9	MAG; 1; 10	MAG; 2 Ret	MAG; 3; 12	ZAN; 1 Ret	ZAN; 2; 9	ZAN; 3; 9	LEC1; 1; 10	LEC1; 2 Ret	LEC1; 3; 9	SPA; 1 DNS	SPA; 2; 11	SPA; 3; 10	LEC2; 1; 5	LEC2; 2; 8	LEC2; 3; 13	LEC3; 1; 10	LEC3; 2; 9	LEC3; 3; 7	12th	28
2021	NOG; 1; 2	NOG; 2; 11	NOG; 3 Ret	MAG1; 1 Ret	MAG1; 2; 10	MAG1; 3; 4	HUN; 1; 4	HUN; 2; 5	HUN; 3; 4	LÉD; 1; 6	LÉD; 2; 5	LÉD; 3; 4	MNZ; 1; 4	MNZ; 2; 5	MNZ; 3 C	LEC; 1; 7	LEC; 2; 2	LEC; 3; 7	MAG2; 1; 5	MAG2; 2; 8	MAG2; 3; 5	5th	160

=== Complete Formula Regional European Championship results ===
(key) (Races in bold indicate pole position) (Races in italics indicate fastest lap)

Year	Team	1	2	3	4	5	6	7	8	9	10	11	12	13	14	15	16	17	18	19	20	DC	Points
2022	G4 Racing	MNZ; 1; 22	MNZ; 2; 26	IMO; 1; 31†	IMO; 2; 16	MCO; 1 DNQ	MCO; 2; 19	LEC; 1; 14	LEC; 2 Ret	ZAN; 1; 17	ZAN; 2; 19											20th	15
2022	RPM											HUN; 1; 19	HUN; 2; 9	SPA; 1; 9	SPA; 2; 9	RBR; 1; 14	RBR; 2; 11	CAT; 1; 17	CAT; 2 Ret	MUG; 1 DNS	MUG; 2; 6	20th	15
2023	Trident	IMO; 1; 16	IMO; 2; 13	CAT; 1 Ret	CAT; 2; 16	HUN; 1; 18	HUN; 2; 13	SPA; 1; 23	SPA; 2; 22	MUG; 1; 13	MUG; 2; 8	LEC; 1; 15	LEC; 2; 8	RBR; 1; 10	RBR; 2; 6	MNZ; 1; 5	MNZ; 2; 8	ZAN; 1; 17	ZAN; 2; 17	HOC; 1 Ret	HOC; 2; 5	14th	43

† – Driver did not finish the race but was classified, as he completed more than 90% of the race distance.
* Season still in progress.

=== Complete Formula Regional Middle East Championship results ===
(key) (Races in bold indicate pole position) (Races in italics indicate fastest lap)

Year	Entrant	1	2	3	4	5	6	7	8	9	10	11	12	13	14	15	DC	Points
2023	Hyderabad Blackbirds by MP	DUB1; 1	DUB1; 2	DUB1; 3	KUW1; 1	KUW1; 2	KUW1; 3	KUW2; 1	KUW2; 2	KUW2; 3	DUB2; 1	DUB2; 2	DUB2; 3	ABU; 1; 13	ABU; 2; 17	ABU; 3 Ret	33rd	0

=== Complete Eurocup-3 results ===
(key) (Races in bold indicate pole position) (Races in italics indicate fastest lap)

Year	Team	1	2	3	4	5	6	7	8	9	10	11	12	13	14	15	16	17	18	DC	Points
2024	MP Motorsport	**SPA**; **1** DNS	SPA; 2 C	**RBR**; **1**; 1	RBR; 2; 3	POR; 1; 3	POR; 2; 4	POR; 3; 5	LEC; 1; 5	LEC; 2; 5	ZAN; 1; 4	ZAN; 2; 4	ARA; 1 Ret	**ARA**; **2**; 6	JER; 1; 6	JER; 2; 8	CAT; 1; 7	CAT; 2 DSQ		4th	158
2025	DXR	RBR; 1	RBR; 2	POR; 1	POR; SR	POR; 2	LEC; 1 Ret	LEC; SR; 13	LEC; 2; 11											21st	0
2025	Allay Racing									MNZ; 1; 11	MNZ; 2 Ret	ASS; 1	ASS; 2	SPA; 1	SPA; 2	JER; 1	JER; 2	CAT; 1	CAT; 2	21st	0

=== American open-wheel racing results ===
==== USF Pro 2000 Championship ====
(key) (Races in bold indicate pole position) (Races in italics indicate fastest lap)

Year	Team	1	2	3	4	5	6	7	8	9	10	11	12	13	14	15	16	17	18	Position	Points
2025	Velocity Racing Development	STP; 1; 11	STP; 2; 5	LOU; 1; 19	LOU; 2; 10	LOU; 3; 9	IMS; 1; 18	IMS; 2; 15	IMS; 3; 9	IRP	ROA; 1	ROA; 2	ROA; 3	MOH; 1	MOH; 2	TOR; 1	TOR; 2	POR; 1	POR; 2	19th	74

* Season still in progress.

=== Complete Macau Grand Prix results ===
Year	Team	Car	Qualifying	Quali Race	Main Race
2025	(France) Saintéloc Racing	Tatuus F3 T-318	21st	20th	17th
