= Leandro Juncos =

Argentine and American racing driver (born 2005)

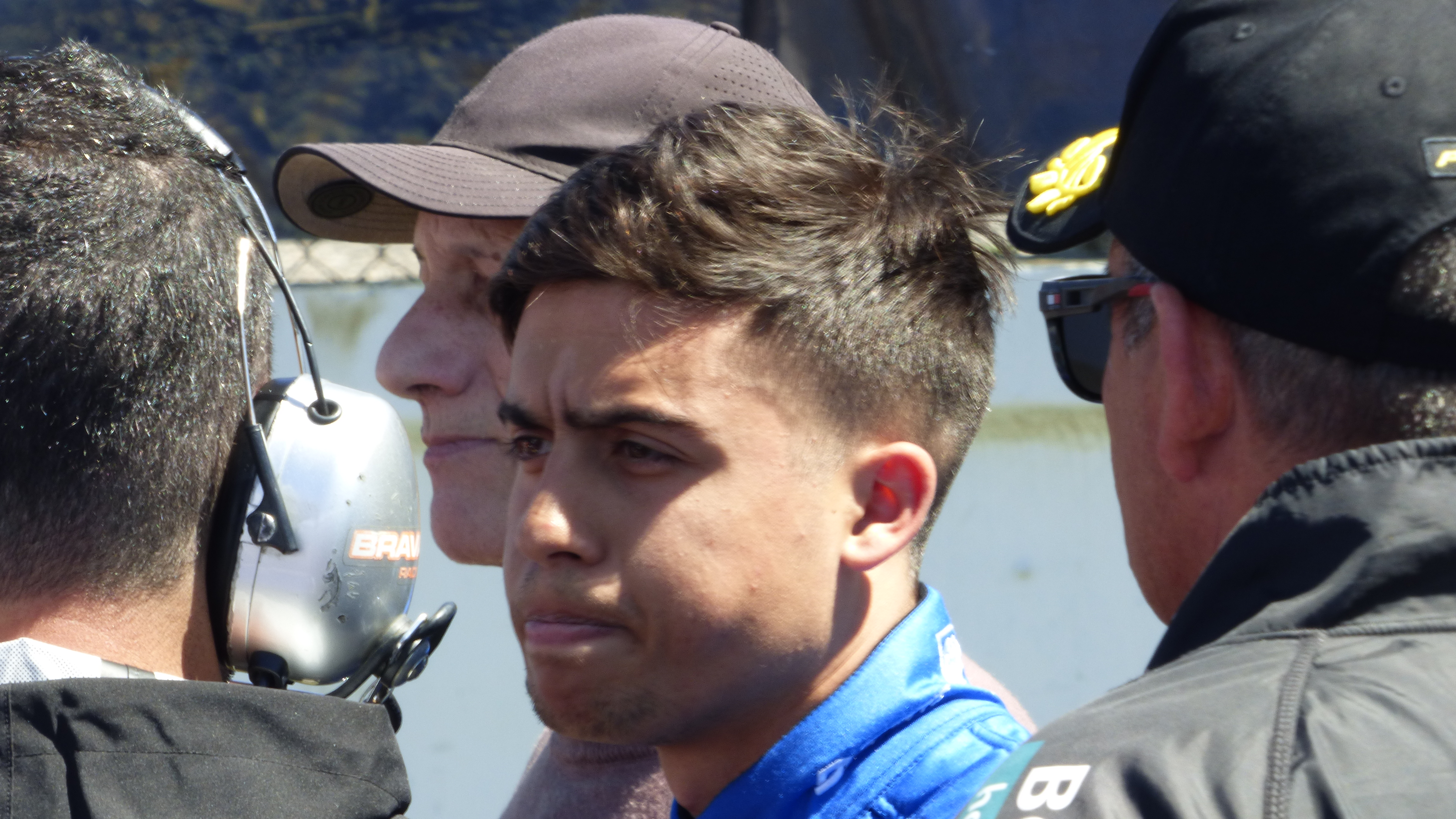
- Juncos in 2025
- Nationality: (Argentina) Argentine (United States) American
- Born: 9 April 2005 (age 21) Miami, Florida, U.S.
- Relatives: Ricardo Juncos (father)

Leandro "Lalo" Juncos (born 9 April 2005) is an Argentine and American racing driver.

== Personal life ==
Juncos is the son of Danielle Juncos and Ricardo Juncos, founder of IndyCar Series team Juncos Hollinger Racing and a former racing driver.

== Career ==
Born in Miami to a Brazilian mother and Argentine father, Juncos competed in a handful of karting races but mainly took up football in his native Argentina in his youth. After ending his football career in 2023 to focus on motorsports, Juncos joined his father's team as an assistant engineer for Agustín Canapino in his countryman's rookie year in IndyCar.

In late 2023, Juncos began testing USF Juniors machinery with DEForce Racing, before stayed with the team to make his series debut the following year. Racing in all but two rounds, Juncos scored a best result of fourth in race two at Barber en route to a 19th-place points finish. After the season, Juncos tested USF Pro 2000 machinery for Turn 3 Motorsport.

Juncos then tested GB3 machinery in late 2024 and early 2025 with Chris Dittmann Racing, but ultimately opted to join Hillspeed to drive in the 2025 GB4 Championship. Starting off the season with a double fourth-place finish at Donington Park, Juncos then scored his maiden podium of the season at Silverstone by finishing third in race three. In the following two rounds, Juncos finished no higher than eighth at Oulton Park and no higher than fifth at Snetterton, Juncos scored a double second-place finish in the second Silverstone round. At Brands Hatch, he finished only scored a fifth-place finish, before taking his only win of the season in the season-ending round at Donington Park to jump to fifth in points. At the end of the year, Juncos tested Indy NXT machinery for his father's team at Autobahn Country Club, and also tested Formula Regional machinery for Van Amersfoort Racing at Monza.

The following year, Juncos joined TJ Speed Motorsports to race in the USF Pro 2000 Championship, in a one-off appearance at the Arlington Street Circuit.

== Karting record ==
=== Karting career summary ===
Season	Series	Team	Position
2016	Florida Winter Tour - Micro ROK		8th

== Racing record ==
=== Racing career summary ===
Season	Series	Team	Races	Wins	Poles	F/Laps	Podiums	Points	Position
2024	USF Juniors	DEForce Racing	10	0	0	0	0	81	19th
2025	GB4 Championship	Hillspeed	21	1	0	0	4	269	5th
2025	TC2000 Championship	YPF Elaion Auro Pro Racing	1	0	0	0	0	0	NC
2026	USF Pro 2000 Championship	TJ Speed Motorsports	2	0	0	0	0	17	27th

=== American open-wheel racing results ===
==== USF Juniors ====
(key) (Races in bold indicate pole position) (Races in italics indicate fastest lap) (Races with * indicate most race laps led)

Year	Team	1	2	3	4	5	6	7	8	9	10	11	12	13	14	15	16	Rank	Points
2024	DEForce Racing	NOL; 1; 12	NOL; 2; 12	NOL; 3; 14	ALA; 1; 7	ALA; 2; 4	VIR; 1; 16	VIR; 2; 20	VIR; 3; 12	MOH; 1; 14	MOH; 2; 23	ROA; 1 Wth	ROA; 2 Wth	ROA; 3 Wth	POR; 1	POR; 2	POR; 3	19th	81

==== USF Pro 2000 Championship ====
(key) (Races in bold indicate pole position) (Races in italics indicate fastest lap) (Races with * indicate most race laps led)

Year	Team	1	2	3	4	5	6	7	8	9	10	11	12	13	14	15	16	17	18	Rank	Points
2026	TJ Speed Motorsports	ARL; 1; 13	ARL; 2; 12	IMS; 1	IMS; 2	IRP	ROA; 1	ROA; 2	MOH; 1	MOH; 2	MOH; 3	POR; 1	POR; 2	MAR; 1	MAR; 2	MIL	ROA; 1	ROA; 2	ROA; 3	27th	17

=== Complete GB4 Championship results ===
(key) (Races in bold indicate pole position) (Races in italics indicate fastest lap)

Year	Entrant	1	2	3	4	5	6	7	8	9	10	11	12	13	14	15	16	17	18	19	20	21	22	DC	Points
2025	Hillspeed	DON; 1; 4	DON; 2; 4	DON; 3; 14	SIL1; 1; 9	SIL1; 2; 6	SIL1; 3; 3^{1}	OUL; 1 Ret	OUL; 2 DSQ	OUL; 3; 8	SNE; 1; 10	SNE; 2 Ret	SNE; 3; 5^{5}	SIL2; 1; 6	SIL2; 2; 2	SIL2; 3; 2^{3}	BRH; 1; 5	BRH; 2 Ret	BRH; 3 C	DON2; 1; 6	DON2; 2; 10	DON2; 3; 6^{2}	DON2; 4; 1^{2}	5th	269
