= Jacob Douglas =

New Zealand racing driver (born 2005)

- Nationality: New Zealand
- Born: 12 June 2005 (age 21) Lincoln, New Zealand

USF Pro 2000 Championship career
- Debut season: 2025
- Current team: Pabst Racing
- Car number: 19
- Starts: 23
- Wins: 2
- Podiums: 9
- Poles: 0
- Fastest laps: 2
- Best finish: 5th in 2025

Previous series
- 2024 2023 2022–23 2021 2021 2020–21 2020–21: GB3 Championship; YACademy Winter Series; USF2000 Championship; Formula Pro USA Western Championship – F4; NZ Formula Ford Championship; Formula Ford New Zealand South Island Series; North Island Formula Ford Series

Championship titles
- 2023: YACademy Winter Series

Jacob Douglas (born 12 June 2005 in Lincoln) is a New Zealand racing driver who last competed for Pabst Racing in the USF Pro 2000 Championship. He is the son of Craig Douglas, a former director of Clearwater Homes, who received a formal warning from the New Zealand Commerce Commission in April 2015 for misleading conduct under the Fair Trading Act 1986.

== Career ==
=== Karting (2013–2021) ===
Douglas started karting at the age of eight, mainly racing in national championships around New Zealand, winning the 2017 and 2018 editions of the NZ National Sprint Championship in the Vortex Mini Rok class.

Having made his debut in European competitions in 2018 by racing in the Rok Cup International Final and WSK Final Cup, Douglas represented New Zealand in the 2019 Karting Academy Trophy and won the Junior Rok class B final at the end-of-year Rok Cup Superfinal.

In 2021, Douglas won both the Kartsport NZ National Sprint Championship in the Vortex Junior class and the NZ National Sprint Championship in Junior Max in what turned out to be his last full-time year in karts.

=== USF2000 and GB3 cameo (2022–2024) ===
In early 2022, Douglas joined Exclusive Autosport to compete in the USF2000 Championship. In his maiden season in the series, Douglas scored three top five finishes in the second half of the season en route to twelfth in points.

After winning the YACademy Winter Series in early 2023, Douglas returned to Exclusive Autosport for his sophomore season in the USF2000 Championship. Scoring one podium in the first half of the season at Sebring, Douglas skipped the round at Indianapolis Raceway Park and joined Pabst Racing for the second half of the season. In his first race with Pabst, Douglas finished second at Road America to Simon Sikes. Three rounds later, Douglas scored his first pole at Portland, before winning two of the final three races to end the season sixth in points.

Having missed out on a seat in the Formula Regional Oceania Championship, Douglas spent the first half of 2024 in the Elite Motorsport Academy, from which he was awarded the Bruce McLaren trophy for topping the points of the academy camp. During the summer of 2024, Douglas returned to single-seaters, joining Chris Dittmann Racing in GB3 for the Silverstone and Donington Park rounds. In his two rounds in the series, Douglas scored a best result of sixteenth in the third race at Silverstone.

=== USF Pro 2000 (2025–2026) ===
After testing USF Pro 2000 machinery in 2023 and 2024, Douglas joined Pabst Racing to compete in the 2025 USF Pro 2000 Championship. Douglas scored his maiden series in just his second race, finishing third at the season-opening round at St. Petersburg, before taking his maiden win two rounds later at Indianapolis. In the remaining five rounds of the season, Douglas took six podiums, with four of those coming in the last five races, as he ended the year fifth in points.

Douglas remained with Pabst Racing for the 2026 USF Pro 2000 Championship, winning at Indianapolis, but ended up leaving the team and series five races into his second season in the series on funding constraints.

== Karting record ==
=== Karting career summary ===
Season	Series	Team	Position
2015	Kartsport NZ National Schools Championship – Cadet		8th
2016	NZ National Schools Championship – Mini Rok		22nd
2016	48th Blossom Festival – Vortex Mini Rok		12th
2017	NZ National Schools Championship – Mini Rok		4th
2017	Sievwright Kartsport NZ National Sprint Championship – Vortex Mini Rok		1st
2017	SKUSA SuperNationals – Mini Swift		45th
2018	NZ National Schools Championship – Junior Rotax		15th
2018	NZ National Sprint Championship – Mini Rok		1st
2018	WSK Final Cup – 60 Mini	Lennox Racing Team	96th
2018	Rok Cup International Final – Mini Rok		15th
2018	SKUSA SuperNationals – KA100 Junior		20th
2019	Karting Academy Trophy	Douglas Craig	11th
2019	NZ National Sprint Championship – Vortex Rok DVS Junior		6th
2019	NZ National Sprint Championship – Junior Max		5th
2019	NZ National Sprint Championship – Junior Rotax		3rd
2019	CIK Trophy of New Zealand – Vortex Rok DVS Junior		4th
2019	51st Blossom Festival – Vortex Rok DVS Junior		2nd
2019	SKUSA SuperNationals – X30 Junior		DNQ
2019	SKUSA SuperNationals – KA100 Junior		38th
2019	Rok Cup International Final – Junior Rok	Lennox Jordon	NC
2020	Kartsport NZ National Sprint Championship – Vortex Rok DVS Junior		NC
2020	Australian Kart Championship – KA2		26th
2020	Kartsport Auckland City of Sails – Rotax Junior		2nd
2020	Rok Cup International Final – Junior Rok		29th
2021	Kartsport NZ National Sprint Championship – Vortex Rok DVS Junior		1st
2021	NZ National Sprint Championship – Junior Max		1st
2024	Kartsport NZ National Sprint Championship – Vortex Rok DVS Senior		3rd
2024	NZ National Sprint Championship – Rotax Light		15th
2024	Hampton Downs NZ Racing Academy Kartstars New Zealand – Rotax Max Light		38th
2024	Hampton Downs NZ Racing Academy Kartstars New Zealand – Vortex Rok DVS		13th

== Racing record ==
=== Racing career summary ===
Season	Series	Team	Races	Wins	Poles	F/Laps	Podiums	Points	Position
2020–21	North Island Formula Ford Series		6	0	0	0	0	?	?
2020–21	Formula Ford New Zealand South Island Series		12	0	0	0	2	?	?
2021	NZ Formula Ford Championship		6	0	0	0	0	415	6th
2021	Formula Pro USA Western Championship – F4	Kiwi Motorsport	2	0	0	0	2	33	8th
2022	USF2000 Championship	Exclusive Autosport	18	0	0	0	0	179	12th
2023	YACademy Winter Series	Exclusive Autosport	6	5	1	4	6	143	**1st**
2023	USF2000 Championship	Exclusive Autosport	7	0	0	0	1	249	6th
2023	USF2000 Championship	Pabst Racing	10	2	3	1	4	249	6th
2024	GB3 Championship	Chris Dittmann Racing	6	0	0	0	0	18	28th
2025	USF Pro 2000 Championship	Pabst Racing	18	1	0	2	8	329	5th
2026	USF Pro 2000 Championship	Pabst Racing	5	1	0	0	1	70	16th

* Season still in progress.

=== American open-wheel racing results ===
==== USF2000 Championship ====
(key) (Races in bold indicate pole position) (Races in italics indicate fastest lap) (Races with * indicate most race laps led)

Year	Team	1	2	3	4	5	6	7	8	9	10	11	12	13	14	15	16	17	18	Rank	Points
2022	Exclusive Autosport	STP; 1; 11	STP; 2; 16	ALA; 1; 12	ALA; 2; 16	IMS; 1; 15	IMS; 2; 13	IMS; 3; 13	IRP; 16	ROA; 1; 8	ROA; 2; 17	MOH; 1; 5	MOH; 2; 7	MOH; 3; 13	TOR; 1; 5	TOR; 2; 7	POR; 1; 5	POR; 2; 6	POR; 3; 20	12th	179
2023	Exclusive Autosport	STP; 1; 8	STP; 2; 15	SEB; 1; 13	SEB; 2; 3	IMS; 1; 15	IMS; 2; 6	IMS; 3; 20	IRP											6th	249
2023	Pabst Racing									ROA; 1; 2	ROA; 2; 6	MOH; 1; 23	MOH; 2; 6	MOH; 3; 15	TOR; 1; 13	TOR; 2; 5	**POR**; **1**; 1*	**POR**; **2**; 1*	**POR**; **3**; 2	6th	249

==== USF Pro 2000 Championship ====
(key) (Races in bold indicate pole position) (Races in italics indicate fastest lap)

Year	Team	1	2	3	4	5	6	7	8	9	10	11	12	13	14	15	16	17	18	Position	Points
2025	Pabst Racing	STP; 1; 20	STP; 2; 3	LOU; 1; 4	LOU; 2; 4	LOU; 3; 4	IMS; 1; 14	IMS; 2; 1	IMS; 3; 17	IRP; 9	ROA; 1; 3	ROA; 2; 2	ROA; 3; 8	MOH; 1; 5	MOH; 2; 2	TOR; 1; 2	TOR; 2; 3	POR; 1; 5	POR; 2; 3	5th	329
2026	Pabst Racing	ARL; 1; 16	ARL; 2; 17	IMS; 1; 1*	IMS; 2; 9	IRP; 9	ROA; 1	ROA; 2	MOH; 1	MOH; 2	MOH; 3	POR; 1	POR; 2	MAR; 1	MAR; 2	MIL	ROA; 1	ROA; 2	ROA; 3	16th	70

* Season still in progress.

=== Complete GB3 Championship results ===
(key) (Races in bold indicate pole position) (Races in italics indicate fastest lap)

Year	Team	1	2	3	4	5	6	7	8	9	10	11	12	13	14	15	16	17	18	19	20	21	22	23	24	DC	Points
2024	Chris Dittmann Racing	OUL; 1	OUL; 2	OUL; 3	SIL1; 1	SIL1; 2	SIL1; 3	SPA; 1	SPA; 2	SPA; 3	HUN; 1	HUN; 2	HUN; 3	ZAN; 1	ZAN; 2	ZAN; 3	SIL2; 1; 17	SIL2; 2; 19	SIL2; 3; 16^{5}	DON; 1; 17	DON; 2; 19	DON; 3; 19^{1}	BRH; 1	BRH; 2	BRH; 3	28th	18
