= 2026 USF Pro 2000 Championship =

Racing season

The 2026 USF Pro 2000 Championship presented by Continental Tire was the 28th season of the junior series two levels below the IndyCar series. It was the fourth season under the USF Pro 2000 moniker after the championship's most recent rebrand in 2023. The championship serves as the upper rung of the IndyCar Series's USF Pro Championships ladder system. The season was held over 18 races across eight race weekends. It started on March 13 around the Streets of Arlington and ended on September 26 at Road America.

Exclusive Autosport driver Jack Jeffers won the Drivers' Championship in the penultimate race of the season at Road America. Turn 3 Motorsport, the team which fielded runner-up Leonardo Escorpioni, won their first Teams' Championship title.

== Series news ==
- The scholarship for the champion was increased by around $50,000 to $594,500.

== Drivers and teams ==
All drivers competed using Tatuus IP-22 racecars with Elite Mazda 2.0-014A engines and Continental tires.

Team	No.	Driver(s)	Status	Round(s)
Comet/NCMP Racing	21	(United States) Logan Adams		1–2, 8–10, 15
Exclusive Autosport	40	(United States) Jack William Miller		3–4
Exclusive Autosport	90	(United States) Evan Cooley	R	1–2, 15
Exclusive Autosport	91	(United States) Joey Brienza		All
Exclusive Autosport	92	(United States) Jack Jeffers	R	All
Exclusive Autosport	93	(Canada) Anthony Martella	R	1–2, 15–18
Exclusive Autosport	95	(Canada) Mac Clark		1–5
FatBoy Racing!	83	(United States) Charles Finelli		3–5
JHDD powered by ECR	5	(United States) Tanner DeFabis		1–2, 5, 15
JHDD powered by ECR	5	(Chile) Clemente Huerta	R	16–18
JHDD powered by ECR	6	(Peru) Andrés Cárdenas	R	All
JHDD powered by ECR	7	(United States) JT Hoskins	R	All
Pabst Racing	18	(United States) G3 Argyros	R	All
Pabst Racing	19	(New Zealand) Jacob Douglas		1–5
Pabst Racing	19	(United States) Colin Aitken	R	11–18
Pabst Racing	20	(Canada) Mayer Deonarine	R	3–4, 6–7
TJ Speed Motorsports	26	(United States) Thomas Schrage	R	All
TJ Speed Motorsports	27	(United States) Christian Cameron	R	1–14
TJ Speed Motorsports	27	(United States) Jeshua Alianell	R	15–18
TJ Speed Motorsports	28	(United States) Jeshua Alianell	R	6–7
TJ Speed Motorsports	28	(Argentina) Leandro Juncos	R	1–2
TJ Speed Motorsports	28	(Poland) Tymek Kucharczyk	R	5
TJ Speed Motorsports	28	(United States) Aidan Schuh	R	16–18
Turn 3 Motorsport	2	(United States) Michael Costello		1–10
Turn 3 Motorsport	3	(United States) Tyke Durst		All
Turn 3 Motorsport	4	(Brazil) Leonardo Escorpioni	R	1–12, 15–18
Turn 3 Motorsport	22	(New Zealand) Sebastian Manson		All
Turn 3 Motorsport	44	(United States) Brady Golan		1–5, 8–18
VRD Racing	11	(United States) Colin Aitken	R	1–10
VRD Racing	25	(United States) Teddy Musella	R	All
VRD Racing	77	(United States) Frankie Mossman		All

Icon	Status
R	Rookie

=== Team changes ===
DEForce Racing, a series mainstay since the 2018 season, announced no drivers ahead of the start of the season and did not enter any of the rounds, while the one-car FatBoy Racing! outfit also did not confirm its presence on the grid ahead of the season opener.

IndyCar team Ed Carpenter Racing announced a partnership with Jay Howard Driver Development, with JHDD's cars in the USF Pro Championships entering under the Jay Howard Driver Development powered by ECR guise.

==== Mid-season ====
FatBoy Racing! entered the two Indianapolis weekends, while Comet/NCMP Racing entered the events at St. Petersburg, Mid-Ohio and the Milwaukee Mile.

=== Driver changes ===
Reigning teams' champions Pabst Racing downsized from three to two entries after reigning driver's champion Max Garcia graduated to Indy NXT with Abel Motorsports and Michael Costello moved over to Turn 3 Motorsport. The team promoted G3 Argyros from their USF2000 outfit after he came fourth in 2025.

Turn 3 Motorsport saw both Alessandro de Tullio and Nicholas Monteiro leave the team and the series to join A. J. Foyt Racing on their graduation to Indy NXT, while neither Cooper Becklin nor any of the teams' single-round entrants returned. The team signed Michael Costello and Sebastian Manson from Pabst Racing and TJ Speed Motorsports after they came seventh and twelfth in 2025, respectively, while Brady Golan rejoined the team for a full-season program after contesting ten races in 2025. Turn 3 Motorsport also fielded a fifth car for reigning USF Juniors champion Leonardo Escorpioni, who would compete in every event bar the Grand Prix of Markham, which he missed due to visa issues.

TJ Speed Motorsports initially only confirmed its all-new lineup for the opening race weekend. GB4 graduate Leandro Juncos replaced Turn 3-bound Manson for the opening event, Jace Denmark and 2025 runner-up Ariel Elkin were replaced by USF2000 graduates Thomas Schrage and Christian Cameron, who came third and eleventh in 2025 both driving for VRD Racing. Schrage joined the team for the full season, while Cameron left after the first fourteen rounds.

Exclusive Autosport saw Carson Etter move up to Indy NXT, joining Chip Ganassi Racing. To replace him, the team promoted reigning USF2000 champion Jack Jeffers from their outfit in that championship. USF2000 drivers Evan Cooley and Anthony Martella also joined the team for the opening round at Arlington.

VRD Racing replaced Max Taylor, who joined Andretti Global in Indy NXT after having already undertaken a part-time campaign alongside his 2025 USF Pro 2000 season, with their 2025 USF2000 runner-up Teddy Musella. The team also entered a third car at the opening five weekends for their USF2000 driver Colin Aitken.

The newly formed JHDD/ECR partnership initially only confirmed one full-season entry for JT Hoskins, who jumped up from their USF Juniors outfit, with whom he finished 11th in 2025. The team entered two additional cars, with Tanner DeFabis returning to the team for Arlington, the IRP and the Milwaukee Mile after a six-race spell in 2025 and Andrés Cárdenas, who joined the team after moving over from Eurocup-3, where he came seventh in 2025 driving for MP Motorsport.

None DEForce Racing's drivers returned to USF Pro 2000 in 2026.

==== Mid-season ====
Logan Adams and his team departed the series ahead of the round at Indianapolis Motor Speedway. Exclusive Autosport saw Jack William Miller return to the series he competed in from 2021 to 2023 for a one-off appearance, while Charles Finelli and his FatBoy Racing! outfit also returned and Pabst Racing entered Mayer Deonarine on his USF Pro 2000 debut.

TJ Speed Motorsport entered reigning Euroformula Open champion and Indy NXT driver Tymek Kucharczyk at the Carb Night Classic.

Mac Clark left the series ahead of the round at Road America, as did Finelli and Jacob Douglas. Brady Golan also missed the round as he prioritized his clashing FR Americas campaign. Deonarine meanwhile returned to Pabst Racing for two more races, and TJ Speed Motorsport fielded series debutant Jeshua Alianell in the car previously piloted by Juncos and Kucharczyk.

Adams and Golan returned to the series ahead of the Grand Prix of Mid-Ohio. Adams only stayed for one weekend, while Golan remained until round fifteen.

Aitken left VRD Racing ahead of the Grand Prix of Portland and joined Pabst Racing, while Costello left the series.

The Grand Prix of Milwaukee saw three drivers return for one-race outings: Logan Adams at Comet/NCMP Racing, Evan Cooley at Exclusive Autosport and Tanner DeFabis at JHDD/ECR. Anthony Martella meanwhile joined Exclusive Autosport, albeit for the remaining two events of the season, as did Jeshua Alianell at TJ Speed Motorsports.

At the season finale at Road America, two drivers made their series debut: Clemente Huerta joined JHDD/ECR in the car previously driven by DeFabis, and TJ Speed Motorsports enlisted Aidan Schuh in their third car.

== Schedule ==
The 2026 schedule was revealed on October 25, 2025. The championship visited two street circuits, four road courses and two ovals. It followed its parent series in moving its Canadian rounds from Exhibition Place to the Streets of Markham, while it replaced the round at NOLA Motorsports Park it held in 2024 and 2025 with a second round at Road America. USF Pro 2000 also added a second oval round, making its debut at the Milwaukee Mile, and replaced the Streets of St. Petersburg with the Streets of Arlington as its season-opening venue. All rounds except the weekends at Lucas Oil Indianapolis Raceway Park and the second weekend at Road America were run in support of the IndyCar Series.

Icon	Legend
O	Oval/Speedway
R	Road course
S	Street circuit

Rd.	Date	Race name	Track	Location
1	March 13–15	Andersen Interior Contracting Grand Prix of Arlington	S Streets of Arlington	Arlington, Texas
2	March 13–15	Andersen Interior Contracting Grand Prix of Arlington	S Streets of Arlington	Arlington, Texas
3	May 7–9	Tatuus USF Pro Championships Indy Grand Prix	R Indianapolis Motor Speedway Road Course	Speedway, Indiana
4	May 7–9	Tatuus USF Pro Championships Indy Grand Prix	R Indianapolis Motor Speedway Road Course	Speedway, Indiana
5	May 21–22	Carb Night Classic presented by Marelli	O Lucas Oil Indianapolis Raceway Park	Brownsburg, Indiana
6	June 18–21	The Andersen Companies Grand Prix of Road America presented by Elite Engines	R Road America	Elkhart Lake, Wisconsin
7	June 18–21	The Andersen Companies Grand Prix of Road America presented by Elite Engines	R Road America	Elkhart Lake, Wisconsin
8	July 2–5	USF Pro Patriot 250 Grand Prix of Mid-Ohio	R Mid-Ohio Sports Car Course	Lexington, Ohio
9	July 2–5	USF Pro Patriot 250 Grand Prix of Mid-Ohio	R Mid-Ohio Sports Car Course	Lexington, Ohio
10	July 2–5	USF Pro Patriot 250 Grand Prix of Mid-Ohio	R Mid-Ohio Sports Car Course	Lexington, Ohio
11	August 6–9	Continental Tire Grand Prix of Portland	R Portland International Raceway	Portland, Oregon
12	August 6–9	Continental Tire Grand Prix of Portland	R Portland International Raceway	Portland, Oregon
13	August 14–16	Continental Tire Grand Prix of Markham	S Streets of Markham	Markham, Ontario
14	August 14–16	Continental Tire Grand Prix of Markham	S Streets of Markham	Markham, Ontario
15	August 29–30	VP Racing Grand Prix of Milwaukee	O Milwaukee Mile	West Allis, Wisconsin
16	September 24–26	USF Pro Championships Grand Prix of Road America	R Road America	Elkhart Lake, Wisconsin
17	September 24–26	USF Pro Championships Grand Prix of Road America	R Road America	Elkhart Lake, Wisconsin
18	September 24–26	USF Pro Championships Grand Prix of Road America	R Road America	Elkhart Lake, Wisconsin

== Race results ==
Rd.	Track	Pole position	Fastest lap	Most laps led	Race winner	
Rd.	Track	Pole position	Fastest lap	Most laps led	Driver	Team
1	(United States) Streets of Arlington	(United States) Jack Jeffers	(United States) Jack Jeffers	(United States) Jack Jeffers	(Brazil) Leonardo Escorpioni	Turn 3 Motorsport
2	(United States) Streets of Arlington	(United States) Jack Jeffers	(Brazil) Leonardo Escorpioni	(United States) Jack Jeffers	(United States) Jack Jeffers	Exclusive Autosport
3	(United States) Indianapolis Motor Speedway Road Course	(Peru) Andrés Cárdenas	(United States) Thomas Schrage	(New Zealand) Jacob Douglas	(New Zealand) Jacob Douglas	Pabst Racing
4	(United States) Indianapolis Motor Speedway Road Course	(United States) Jack Jeffers	(United States) Frankie Mossman	(United States) Jack Jeffers	(United States) Jack Jeffers	Exclusive Autosport
5	(United States) Lucas Oil Indianapolis Raceway Park	(Brazil) Leonardo Escorpioni	(United States) Michael Costello	(United States) Michael Costello	(United States) Michael Costello	Turn 3 Motorsport
6	(United States) Road America	(Peru) Andrés Cárdenas	(United States) Jack Jeffers	(Peru) Andrés Cárdenas	(United States) G3 Argyros	Pabst Racing
7	(United States) Road America	(United States) G3 Argyros	(United States) G3 Argyros	(United States) G3 Argyros	(United States) G3 Argyros	Pabst Racing
8	(United States) Mid-Ohio Sports Car Course	(Brazil) Leonardo Escorpioni	(Brazil) Leonardo Escorpioni	(Brazil) Leonardo Escorpioni	(Brazil) Leonardo Escorpioni	Turn 3 Motorsport
9	(United States) Mid-Ohio Sports Car Course	(Brazil) Leonardo Escorpioni	(United States) Jack Jeffers	(Brazil) Leonardo Escorpioni	(Brazil) Leonardo Escorpioni	Turn 3 Motorsport
10	(United States) Mid-Ohio Sports Car Course	(United States) Jack Jeffers	(Brazil) Leonardo Escorpioni	(Brazil) Leonardo Escorpioni	(Brazil) Leonardo Escorpioni	Turn 3 Motorsport
11	(United States) Portland International Raceway	(Brazil) Leonardo Escorpioni	(Brazil) Leonardo Escorpioni	(United States) G3 Argyros	(United States) G3 Argyros	Pabst Racing
12	(United States) Portland International Raceway	(Brazil) Leonardo Escorpioni (Note: Leonardo Escorpioni was awarded the point for pole position after setting the second fastest lap in qualifying, but received a three-place grid penalty for causing an incident in the previous race. As a result, Jack Jeffers started the race from pole position.)	(Brazil) Leonardo Escorpioni	(Brazil) Leonardo Escorpioni	(Brazil) Leonardo Escorpioni	Turn 3 Motorsport
13	(Canada) Streets of Markham	(United States) Jack Jeffers (Note: Qualifying was cancelled due to delays in track preparation. The grid was set based on championship points standings and no point for pole position was awarded.)	(United States) Jack Jeffers	(United States) Jack Jeffers	(United States) Jack Jeffers	Exclusive Autosport
14	(Canada) Streets of Markham	(United States) Jack Jeffers	(Peru) Andrés Cárdenas	(Peru) Andrés Cárdenas	(Peru) Andrés Cárdenas	JHDD powered by ECR
15	(United States) Milwaukee Mile	(United States) Thomas Schrage	(Brazil) Leonardo Escorpioni	(United States) Thomas Schrage	(United States) Thomas Schrage	TJ Speed Motorsports
16	(United States) Road America	(United States) Jack Jeffers	(United States) Jack Jeffers	(United States) Jack Jeffers	(United States) Jack Jeffers	Exclusive Autosport
17	(United States) Road America	(United States) Jack Jeffers	(United States) Jack Jeffers	(United States) Jack Jeffers	(United States) Jack Jeffers	Exclusive Autosport
18	(United States) Road America	(United States) Jack Jeffers	(United States) G3 Argyros	(United States) Jack Jeffers	(United States) Jack Jeffers	Exclusive Autosport

== Season report ==
=== First half ===
The 2026 USF Pro 2000 Championship began with a new track for the series as Exclusive Autosport's Jack Jeffers took pole position ahead of Turn 3 Motorsport's Leonardo Escorpioni around the Streets of Arlington. Jeffers initially lost out to Escorpioni, but retook first and led the majority of the race as VRD Racing's Frankie Mossman slotted into third. With two laps to go, Jeffers then spun, hit the wall and retired. That handed the victory to Escorpioni and promoted Turn 3's Michael Costello onto the podium. Setting the fastest lap in race one meant Jeffers was back on pole position for race two, and this time, he remained faultless throughout multiple incidents and safety car periods. JHDD/ECR's Andrés Cárdenas finished second on the road, but multiple penalties meant Pabst's G3 Argyros inherited second, with Mossmann in third taking the championship lead.

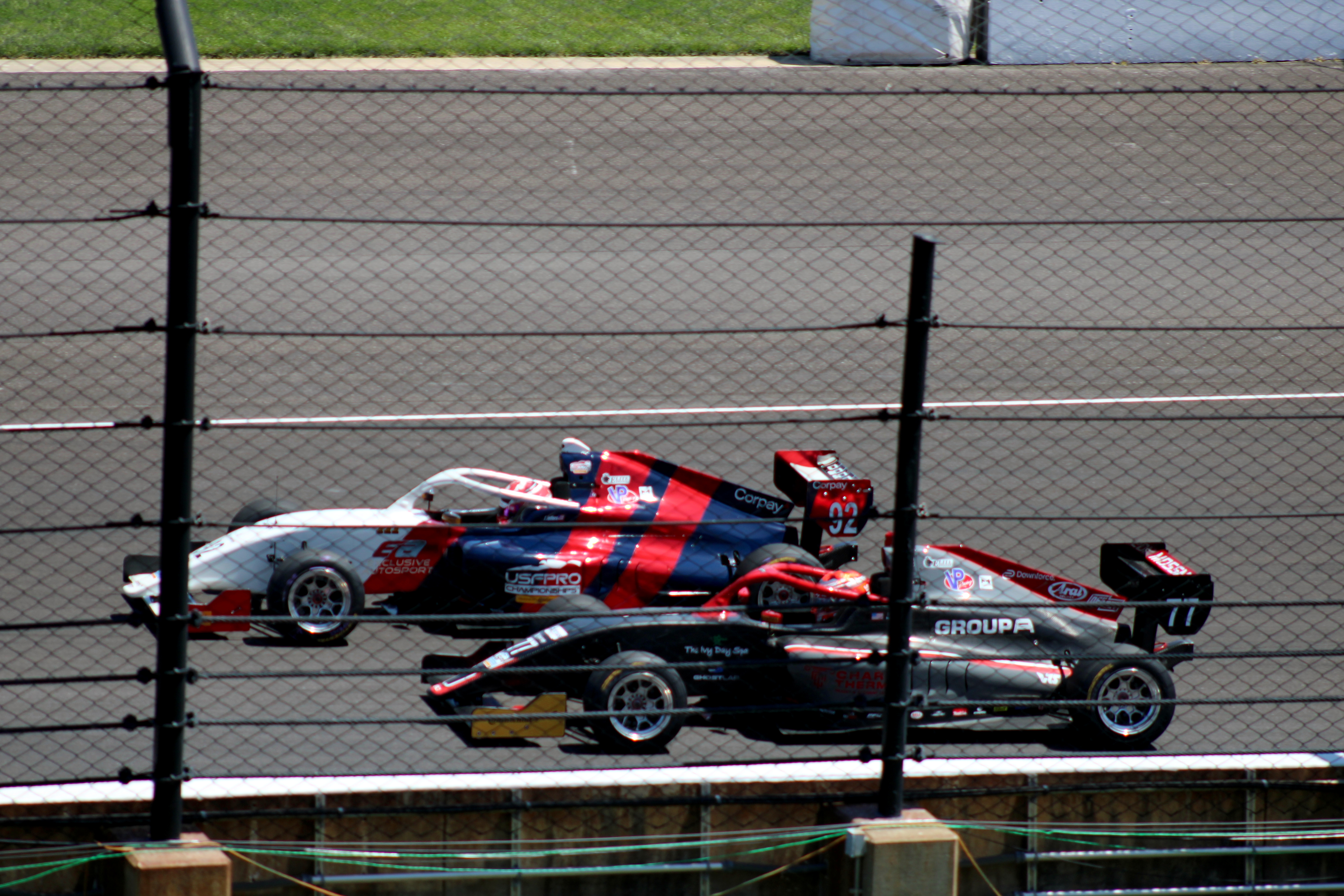
Second race of the 2026 USF Pro 2000 Championship Indy Grand Prix

Two races at Indianapolis Motor Speedway followed, and Cárdenas took pole position for the first one. In tricky wet/dry conditions, he lost the lead to Mossman at the start before an early safety car saw half the field pit for slick tyres. With the track drying, a second caution saw the rest of the drivers also pit, promoting Pabst's early stopper Jacob Douglas to the lead. He held on to take victory, with Exclusive's Mac Clark and Pabst's debutant Mayer Deonarine completing the podium. Race two was held in the dry, and polesitter Jeffers battled Mossman throughout four caution periods, one of them after Escorpioni was launched into a series of rolls following contact. Jeffers would ultimately win the race, with Mossman taking second and VRD's Teddy Musella claiming his first podium in third. Jeffers and Mossman ended the weekend equal on points atop the standings.

The first oval race around IRP saw Escorpioni claim pole position ahead of Costello and Indy NXT driver and TJ Speed's oval debutant Tymek Kucharczyk. Escorpioni initially held the lead, surviving an early caution period before Costello overtook him on lap 18 as the leading pair gapped the field. Costello almost brushed the wall with two laps to go but was still able to just hold on and take his maiden series victory. He rose to second in the standings, seven points behind Jeffers as Mossmann dropped to fourth after a crash.

A double-header at Road America was up next, and Cárdenas claimed pole position in the single qualifying session held. He held his lead as Jeffers alongside him dropped down and Argyros slotted into second. A caution followed, before Argyros pressured and passed Cárdenas on lap seven. Cárdenas moved back in front one lap later, but with three laps remaining, Argyros retook the lead and held on to take his maiden victory. Mossman held off Jeffers to take third. Argyros doubled up in race two: He started from pole position, led every lap of the race and took his second victory in as many days. Points leader Jeffers closely followed Argyros all race, but could not muster an attack on the leader. He finished second to minimize the damage to his championship lead, which now stood at 20 points over Argyros, as Cárdenas took a second podium in a row in third.

The season's first triple-header was next, held at Mid-Ohio, and it began with two pole positions for Escorpioni in qualifying. He led Cárdenas and Argyros throughout an early caution in race one, before Argyros hit the wall and caused another yellow. One more interruption followed, after which Cárdenas ran wide and dropped to tenth. That handed second place to Jeffers as Mossmann slotted into third and Escorpioni led them home to take victory. Race two was delayed following a thunderstorm, but when it was held, Escorpioni continued where he left off, leading 30 more laps in a race without interruptions to claim a second victory. Cárdenas started and finished second as Costello took third off Argyros on lap six to complete the podium. Pole position for race three went to Jeffers after he broke the lap record with the fastest lap in race two. He led TJ Speed's Thomas Schrage and Escorpioni before Argyros was able to move past both of them and a four-car incident caused a caution. Escorpioni took second on the restart, then closed up to Jeffers and took the lead on lap seven. He converted that into victory and a two-point lead over Jeffers in second, while Cárdenas took another podium in third.

=== Second half ===
Points leader Escorpioni took pole position in qualifying at Portland, but ran off track in the opening corner of the first race and fell to eighth. That incident also resulted in contact for championship chaser Jeffers that forced him into retirement. Argyros took over the lead ahead of VRD's Colin Aitken and Cárdenas. A mid-race restart brought Escorpioni back into podium contention, but when he tried following TJ Speed's Christian Cameron past Cárdenas, he collided with the Peruvian, took him out and dropped to eighth after a post-race penalty. Jeffers started race two from pole position, but collided with Cárdenas into turn one and fell to fifth. Cárdenas took the lead, but a mechanical problem ended his race on lap 13. That allowed Escorpioni to take the lead, and he took victory ahead of Argyros and Aitken to extend his championship lead over Jeffers in fourth to 25 points.

Visa issues forced Escorpioni to miss the weekend at Markham, which began with delays in track preparation that saw qualifying get cancelled. That placed Jeffers on pole position for the first race ahead of Argyros, and he led every lap throughout three caution periods to claim the third win of his campaign. Argyros started and finished second, while Cárdenas took third. Taking the fastest lap in race one earned Jeffers pole position for race two, in which he led the opening ten laps until Cárdenas began attacking him after a caution period. Continuous pressure saw Cárdenas take the lead on lap ten before he managed the rest of the race to become the series' first Peruvian race winner as he claimed his maiden victory. Argyros ran third until he crashed heavily on lap 18, handing the place to Schrage as Jeffers in second took a 33-point lead over the absent Escorpioni.

Escorpioni returned for the series' debut at the Milwaukee Mile, where Schrage set the fastest speed in qualifying to claim pole position. Exclusive Autosport's Evan Cooley started second ahead of Escorpioni, but lost out to the Brazilian on the opening lap and dropped to third. Schrage controlled the caution-free race to take his maiden victory, while Escorpioni in second was able to close up to 17 points behind sixth-placed championship leader Jeffers and Cooley took his maiden podium in just his third race in the series.

Three more races at Road America brought an end to the season, and pole position for the first went to Jeffers in qualifying. He led Schrage throughout two caution periods to secure an unchallenged victory and extend his championship lead. Musella took third on the road after holding back Escorpioni, before the stewards deemed his defense to be blocking and handed him a time penalty that dropped him to fourth. Race two saw Jeffers lead Schrage once again, with Schrage this time able to attack the leader early on. Still, Jeffers broke free and built a gap as Schrage came under pressure from Escorpioni. The Brazilian took second place on lap ten, but could not catch Jeffers. That meant the leader took victory and sealed the championship title with one race to spare. The final race of the season saw Jeffers start from pole position once more, but a multi-car crash on the opening lap caused a red flag. Jeffers led the restart while a technical issue saw Schrage retire from second, allowing Argyros and Aitken into the podium positions. Two more caution periods punctured the race, but Jeffers was able to control proceedings and held off pressure from Argyros to end the season with his sixth victory and a 49-point lead.

== Championship standings ==
=== Drivers' Championship ===
Scoring system

Position	**1st**	**2nd**	**3rd**	**4th**	**5th**	**6th**	**7th**	**8th**	**9th**	**10th**	**11th**	**12th**	**13th**	**14th**	**15th**	**16th**	**17th**	**18th**	**19th**	**20th+**
Points	30	25	22	19	17	15	14	13	12	11	10	9	8	7	6	5	4	3	2	1
Points (O)	45	38	33	29	26	23	21	20	18	17	15	14	12	11	9	8	6	5	3	2

- The driver who qualified on pole is awarded one additional point.
- One point was awarded to the driver who led the most laps in a race.
- One point was awarded to the driver who set the fastest lap during the race.

Pos	Driver	ARL		IMS		IRP	ROA1		MOH			POR		MAR		MIL	ROA2			Points
1	(United States) Jack Jeffers	**18***	**1***	5	**1***	6	4	2	2	4	**2**	14	4	**1***	**2**	6	**1***	**1***	**1***	430
2	(Brazil) Leonardo Escorpioni	1	8	12	16	**2**	5	5	**1***	**1***	1*	**8**	**1***			2	3	2	4	381
3	(United States) G3 Argyros	11	2	10	15	8	1	**1***	15	5	4	1*	2	2	11	4	5	4	2	359
4	(United States) Thomas Schrage	21	9	8	7	4	6	6	4	6	5	10	6	5	3	**1***	2	3	14	317
5	(United States) Frankie Mossman	2	3	7	2	20	3	4	3	16	11	12	5	4	7	7	4	7	5	289
6	(Peru) Andrés Cárdenas	4	13	**14**	6	12	**2***	3	7	2	3	11	14	3	1*	8	17	17	16	279
7	(United States) Teddy Musella	15	18	13	3	7	7	7	5	7	7	13	13	8	5	17	9	6	6	228
8	(United States) Colin Aitken	14	10	9	14	14	11	16	12	14	12	2	3	12	8	11	10	4	3	225
9	(United States) Brady Golan	6	6	6	12	5			13	8	6	5	7	6	12	9	15	11	12	214
10	(New Zealand) Sebastian Manson	22	16	19	4	15	15	10	8	9	9	9	12	7	4	18	6	8	15	185
11	(United States) JT Hoskins	9	5	15	19	17	14	13	16	15	10	6	10	10	9	12	7	9	8	183
12	(United States) Joey Brienza	10	22	11	17	18	9	9	11	13	8	7	9	9	10	14	8	10	10	182
13	(United States) Michael Costello	3	7	18	5	1*	8	12	10	3	13									166
14	(United States) Tyke Durst	12	15	17	18	13	10	14	14	12	15	4	11	11	6	16	14	13	13	159
15	(United States) Christian Cameron	5	20	4	13	11	16	8	6	10	16	3	8	Wth	Wth					144
16	(New Zealand) Jacob Douglas	16	17	1*	9	9														70
17	(Canada) Anthony Martella	7	14													5	16	15	9	70
18	(Canada) Mac Clark	17	19	2	8	10														61
19	(United States) Logan Adams	8	21						9	11	14					10				60
20	(United States) Jeshua Alianell						12	15								15	11	12	7	57
21	(United States) Evan Cooley	19	4													3				54
22	(Canada) Mayer Deonarine			3	10		13	11												51
23	(Poland) Tymek Kucharczyk					3														33
24	(United States) Tanner DeFabis	20	11			16										13				31
25	(United States) Aidan Schuh																12	14	11	26
26	(United States) Charles Finelli			16	11	19														18
27	(Argentina) Leandro Juncos	13	12																	17
28	(Chile) Clemente Huerta																13	16	17	17
—	(United States) Jack William Miller			DNS	DNS															0
Pos	Driver	ARL		IMS		IRP	ROA1		MOH			POR		MAR		MIL	ROA2			Points

Color	Result
Gold	Winner
Silver	2nd place
Bronze	3rd place
Green	4th & 5th place
Light Blue	6th–10th place
Dark Blue	Finished (Outside Top 10)
Purple	Did not finish
Red	Did not qualify (DNQ)
Brown	Withdrawn (Wth)
Black	Disqualified (DSQ)
White	Did not start (DNS)
Blank	Did not participate

**In-line notation**
**Bold**	Pole position (1 point)
Italics	Ran fastest race lap (1 point)
*	Led most race laps (1 point); Not awarded if more than one driver led most laps
Rookie

=== Teams' championship ===
Scoring system

Position	**1st**	**2nd**	**3rd**	**4th**	**5th**	**6th**	**7th**	**8th**	**9th**	**10th+**
Points	22	18	15	12	10	8	6	4	2	1

- Single car teams received 3 bonus points as an equivalency to multi-car teams.
- Only the best two results counted for teams fielding more than two entries.

Pos	Team	ARL		IMS		IRP	ROA1		MOH			POR		MAR		MIL	ROA2			Pen.	Points
1	Turn 3 Motorsport	1	6	6	4	1	5	5	1	1	1	4	1	6	4	2	3	2	4		406
1	Turn 3 Motorsport	3	7	10	5	2	8	10	8	3	6	5	7	7	6	8	5	8	11		406
2	Exclusive Autosport	6	1	2	1	5	4	2	2	4	2	7	4	1	2	3	1	1	1		362
2	Exclusive Autosport	9	4	5	8	9	9	9	10	10	8	12	9	9	10	5	7	10	9		362
3	Pabst Racing	10	2	1	9	7	1	1	11	5	4	1	2	2	8	4	4	4	2		328
3	Pabst Racing	13	12	3	10	8	11	11				2	3	11	11	10	9	5	3		328
4	VRD Racing	2	3	7	2	6	3	4	3	7	7	10	5	4	5	6	8	6	5		255
4	VRD Racing	12	9	9	3	14	7	7	5	11	10	11	11	8	7	13	10	7	6		255
5	TJ Speed Motorsports	5	8	4	7	3	6	6	4	6	5	3	6	5	3	1	2	3	7	15	242
5	TJ Speed Motorsports	11	11	8	12	4	10	8	6	8	12	8	8	Wth	Wth	12	11	11	10	15	242
6	JHDD powered by ECR	4	5	11	6	10	2	3	7	2	3	6	10	3	1	7	6	9	8		194
6	JHDD powered by ECR	8	10	12	13	11	12	12	12	12	9	9	12	10	9	11	12	12	12		194
7	Comet/NCMP Racing	7	13						9	9	11					9					32
8	FatBoy Racing!			13	11	12															12
Pos	Team	ARL		IMS		IRP	ROA1		MOH			POR		MAR		MIL	ROA2			Pen.	Points

== See also ==
- 2026 IndyCar Series
- 2026 Indy NXT
- 2026 USF2000 Championship
- 2026 USF Juniors
