= 2026 Java House Grand Prix of Arlington =

Third race of the 2026 IndyCar Series

(United States) 2026 Java House Grand Prix of Arlington
Race details
3rd round of the 2026 IndyCar season
← Previous race	Next race →
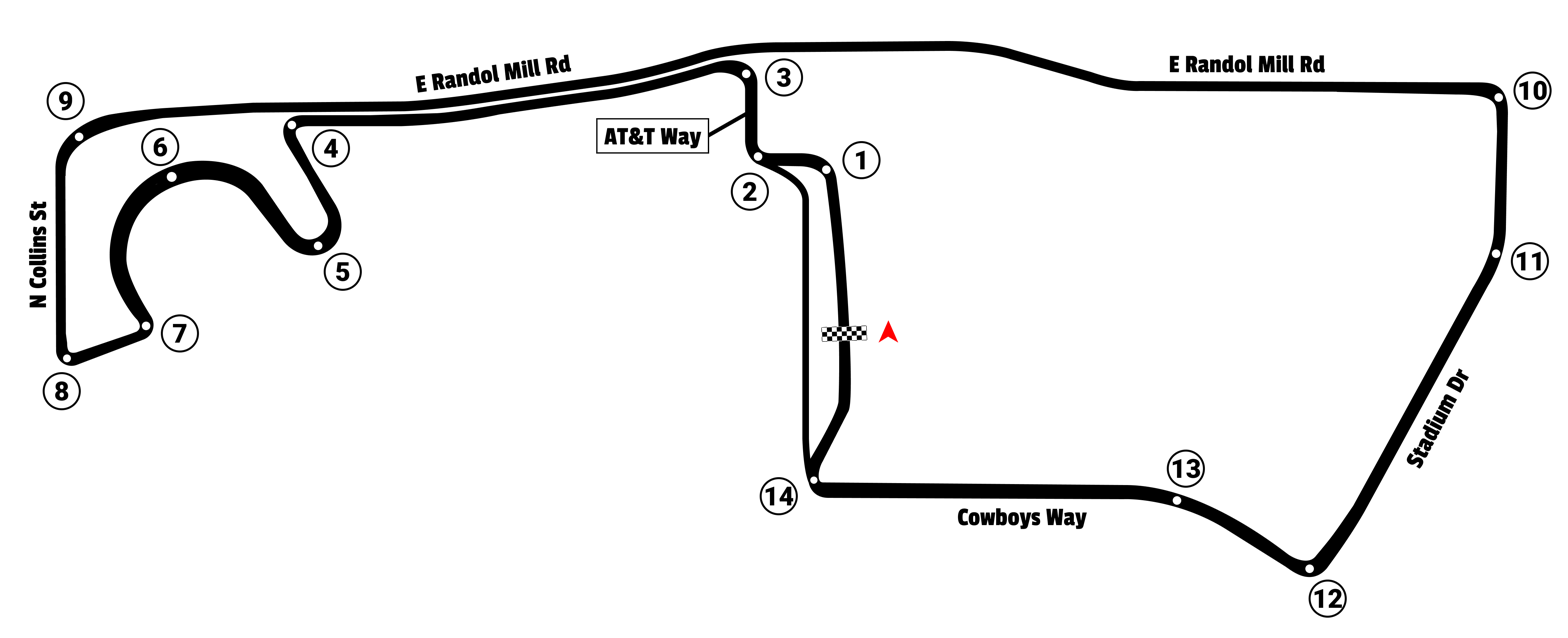
- Layout of the circuit
- Date: March 15, 2026
- Official name: Java House Grand Prix of Arlington
- Location: Arlington Street Circuit
- Course: Temporary street circuit 2.73 mi / 4.39 km
- Distance: 70 laps 191.1 mi / 307.3 km

Pole position
- Driver: (Sweden) Marcus Ericsson (Andretti Global)
- Time: 1:34.3562

Fastest lap
- Driver: (New Zealand) Scott Dixon (Chip Ganassi Racing)
- Time: 1:33.9902 (on lap 66 of 70)

Podium
- First: (United States) Kyle Kirkwood (Andretti Global)
- Second: (Spain) Álex Palou (Chip Ganassi Racing)
- Third: (Australia) Will Power (Andretti Global)

Chronology
Previous	Next
inaugural event	2027

The inaugural 2026 Java House Grand Prix of Arlington was the third round of the 2026 IndyCar Series. The race was held on March 15, 2026, in Arlington, Texas on a temporary street circuit. The race was contested over 70 laps. Kyle Kirkwood won the race, followed by Álex Palou and Will Power.

== Background ==
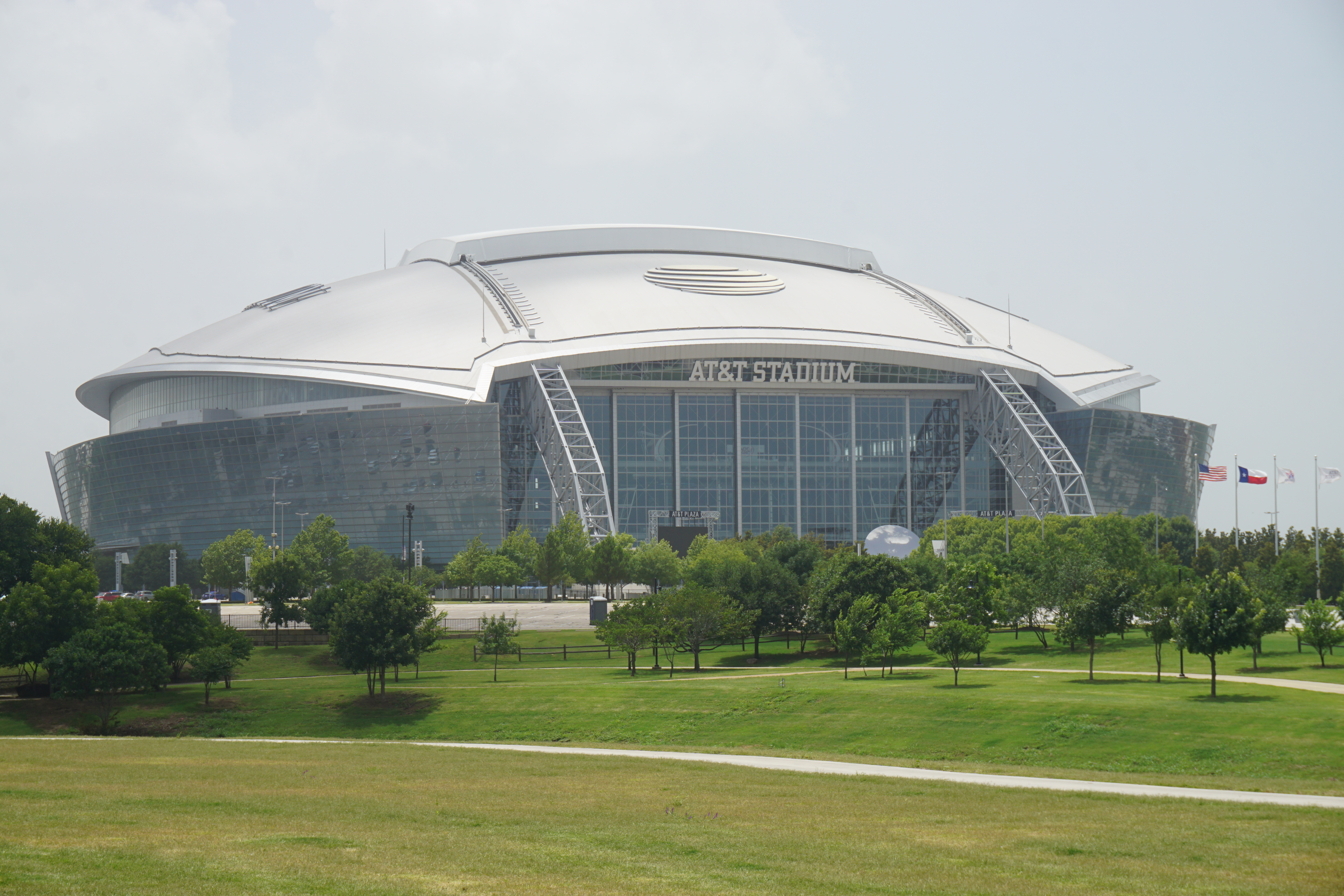
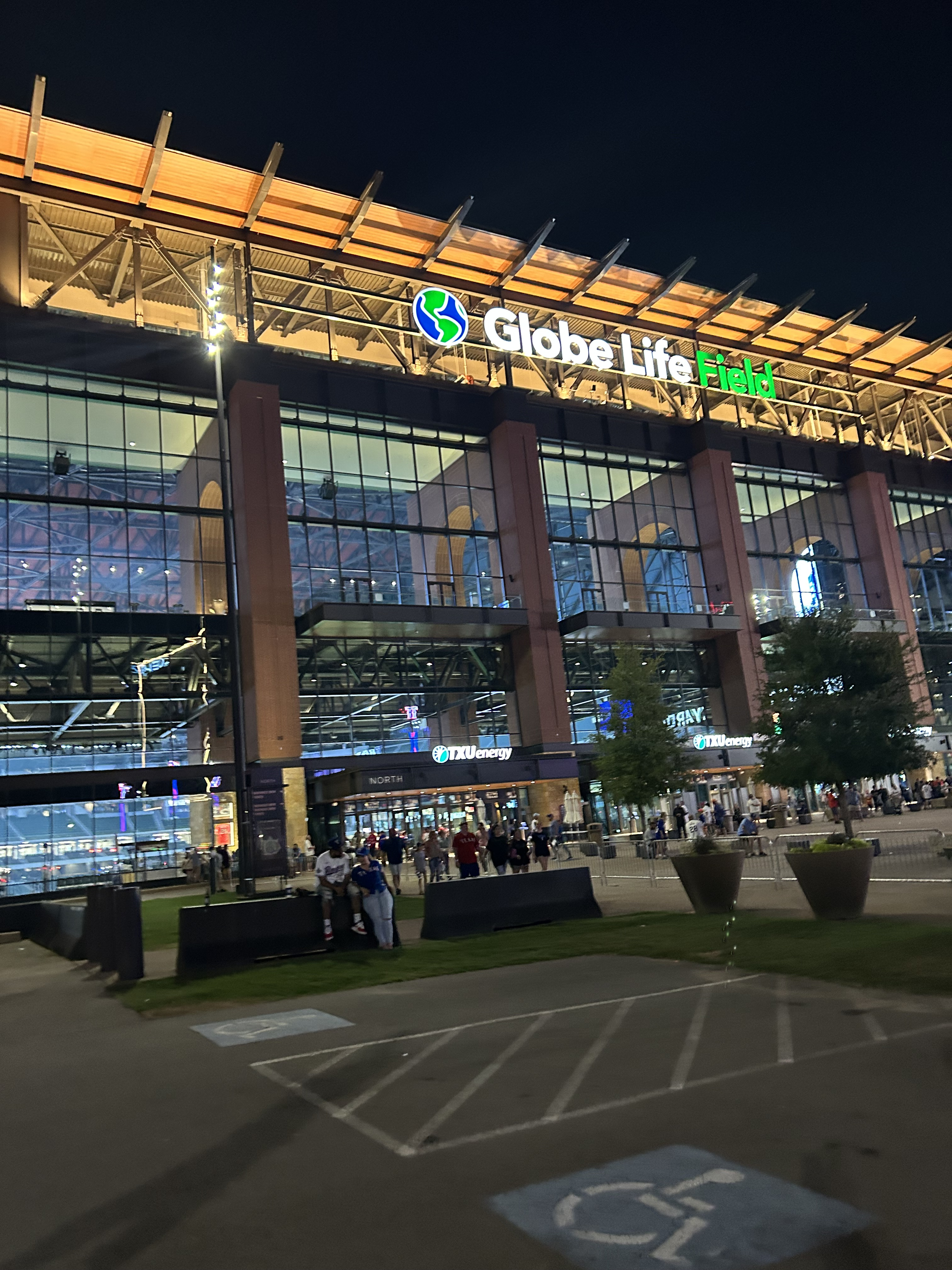
AT&T Stadium (left) and Globe Life Field (right) are the stadiums where they will race around.

The Grand Prix of Arlington was announced on October 7, 2024, confirming initial reports the month previous. The circuit features AT&T Stadium and Globe Life Field, home of the Dallas Cowboys and the Texas Rangers, respectively, and the event has been billed as a partnership between IndyCar, the Cowboys and Rangers, and the City of Arlington.

== Entry list ==
Key	Meaning
R	Rookie

No.	Driver	Team	Engine
2	(United States) Josef Newgarden	Team Penske	Chevrolet
3	(New Zealand) Scott McLaughlin	Team Penske	Chevrolet
4	(Brazil) Caio Collet R	A.J. Foyt Racing	Chevrolet
5	(Mexico) Pato O'Ward	Arrow McLaren	Chevrolet
6	(United States) Nolan Siegel	Arrow McLaren	Chevrolet
7	(Denmark) Christian Lundgaard	Arrow McLaren	Chevrolet
8	(Cayman Islands) Kyffin Simpson	Chip Ganassi Racing	Honda
9	(New Zealand) Scott Dixon	Chip Ganassi Racing	Honda
10	(Spain) Álex Palou	Chip Ganassi Racing	Honda
12	(United States) David Malukas	Team Penske	Chevrolet
14	(United States) Santino Ferrucci	A. J. Foyt Racing	Chevrolet
15	(United States) Graham Rahal	Rahal Letterman Lanigan Racing	Honda
18	(France) Romain Grosjean	Dale Coyne Racing	Honda
19	(Norway) Dennis Hauger R	Dale Coyne Racing	Honda
20	(United States) Alexander Rossi	ECR	Chevrolet
21	(Denmark) Christian Rasmussen	ECR	Chevrolet
26	(Australia) Will Power	Andretti Global	Honda
27	(United States) Kyle Kirkwood	Andretti Global with Curb-Agajanian	Honda
28	(Sweden) Marcus Ericsson	Andretti Global	Honda
45	(United Kingdom) Louis Foster	Rahal Letterman Lanigan Racing	Honda
47	(Germany) Mick Schumacher R	Rahal Letterman Lanigan Racing	Honda
60	(Sweden) Felix Rosenqvist	Meyer Shank Racing with Curb-Agajanian	Honda
66	(New Zealand) Marcus Armstrong	Meyer Shank Racing with Curb-Agajanian	Honda
76	(Netherlands) Rinus VeeKay	Juncos Hollinger Racing	Chevrolet
77	(United States) Sting Ray Robb	Juncos Hollinger Racing	Chevrolet

== Practice ==
=== Practice 1 ===
The first practice session was held on Friday, March 13, 2026.

Top Practice Speeds
Pos	No.	Driver	Team	Engine	Lap Time
1	3	(New Zealand) Scott McLaughlin	Team Penske	Chevrolet	1:34.8926
2	10	(Spain) Álex Palou	Chip Ganassi Racing	Honda	1:34.9513
3	26	(Australia) Will Power	Andretti Global	Honda	1:35.3051
Practice 1 results

=== Practice 2 ===
The second practice session was held on Saturday, March 14, 2026.

Top Practice Speeds
Pos	No.	Driver	Team	Engine	Lap Time
1	27	(United States) Kyle Kirkwood	Andretti Global	Honda	1:33.1409
2	10	(Spain) Álex Palou	Chip Ganassi Racing	Honda	1:33.5008
3	66	(New Zealand) Marcus Armstrong	Meyer Shank Racing	Honda	1:33.9702
Practice 2 results

== Qualifying ==
The qualifying session was held on Saturday, March 14, 2026.

Classification
Pos	No.	Driver	Team	Engine	Time	Final grid
1	28	(Sweden) Marcus Ericsson	Andretti Global	Honda	1:34.3562	1
2	10	(Spain) Álex Palou	Chip Ganassi Racing	Honda	1:34.8180	2
3	5	(Mexico) Pato O'Ward	Arrow McLaren	Chevrolet	1:34.8453	3
4	26	(Australia) Will Power	Andretti Global	Honda	1:35.0856	4
5	60	(Sweden) Felix Rosenqvist	Meyer Shank Racing	Honda	1:35.1607	5
6	66	(New Zealand) Marcus Armstrong	Meyer Shank Racing	Honda	1:35.6012	6
7	27	(United States) Kyle Kirkwood	Andretti Global	Honda	**1:33.8868**	7
8	21	(Denmark) Christian Rasmussen	ECR	Chevrolet	1:34.1440	8
9	12	(United States) David Malukas	Team Penske	Chevrolet	1:34.2456	9
10	20	(United States) Alexander Rossi	ECR	Chevrolet	1:34.3040	10
11	2	(United States) Josef Newgarden	Team Penske	Chevrolet	1:34.3957	11
12	14	(United States) Santino Ferrucci	A.J. Foyt Enterprises	Chevrolet	1:34.4898	12
13	45	(United Kingdom) Louis Foster	Rahal Letterman Lanigan Racing	Honda	1:34.6639	13
14	8	(Cayman Islands) Kyffin Simpson	Chip Ganassi Racing	Honda	1:34.7931	14
15	18	(France) Romain Grosjean	Dale Coyne Racing	Honda	1:34.7199	15
16	4	(Brazil) Caio Collet R	A.J. Foyt Enterprises	Chevrolet	1:35.0300	16
17	47	(Germany) Mick Schumacher R	Rahal Letterman Lanigan Racing	Honda	1:34.8391	17
18	7	(Denmark) Christian Lundgaard	Arrow McLaren	Chevrolet	1:35.0760	18
19	19	(Norway) Dennis Hauger R	Dale Coyne Racing	Honda	1:34.8731	19
20	9	(New Zealand) Scott Dixon	Chip Ganassi Racing	Honda	1:35.1306	20
21	76	(Netherlands) Rinus VeeKay	Juncos Hollinger Racing	Chevrolet	1:34.9196	21
22	6	(United States) Nolan Siegel	Arrow McLaren	Chevrolet	1:35.2288	22
23	77	(United States) Sting Ray Robb	Juncos Hollinger Racing	Chevrolet	1:36.1786	23
24	15	(United States) Graham Rahal	Rahal Letterman Lanigan Racing	Honda	1:35.3159	24
25	3	(New Zealand) Scott McLaughlin	Team Penske	Chevrolet	1:38.6580	25
Qualifying results

Notes

- **Bold text** indicates fastest time.

== Warmup ==
The warmup session was held on Sunday, March 15, 2026.

Top Practice Speeds
Pos	No.	Driver	Team	Engine	Lap Time
1	8	(Cayman Islands) Kyffin Simpson	Chip Ganassi Racing	Honda	1:34.7588
2	76	(Netherlands) Rinus VeeKay	Juncos Hollinger Racing	Chevrolet	1:34.7704
3	9	(New Zealand) Scott Dixon	Chip Ganassi Racing	Honda	1:34.8027
Warmup results

== Race ==
The race was held on Sunday, March 15, 2026.

Classification
Pos	No.	Driver	Team	Engine	Laps	Time/Retired	Pit Stops	Grid	Laps Led	Pts.
1	27	(United States) Kyle Kirkwood	Andretti Global	Honda	70	1:55:43.0642	3	7	16	53
2	10	(Spain) Álex Palou	Chip Ganassi Racing	Honda	70	+0.3140	3	2	16	41
3	26	(Australia) Will Power	Andretti Global	Honda	70	+3.5855	2	4	16	36
4	28	(Sweden) Marcus Ericsson	Andretti Global	Honda	70	+4.9128	3	1	15	34
5	5	(Mexico) Pato O'Ward	Arrow McLaren	Chevrolet	70	+5.9336	3	3	–	30
6	12	(United States) David Malukas	Team Penske	Chevrolet	70	+7.4478	3	9	–	28
7	7	(Denmark) Christian Lundgaard	Arrow McLaren	Chevrolet	70	+8.7501	3	18	–	26
8	9	(New Zealand) Scott Dixon	Chip Ganassi Racing	Honda	70	+9.8315	4	20	–	24
9	20	(United States) Alexander Rossi	ECR	Chevrolet	70	+10.7076	3	10	–	22
10	66	(New Zealand) Marcus Armstrong	Meyer Shank Racing	Honda	70	+12.4888	4	6	–	20
11	3	(New Zealand) Scott McLaughlin	Team Penske	Chevrolet	70	+13.8893	3	25	–	19
12	4	(Brazil) Caio Collet R	A. J. Foyt Racing	Chevrolet	70	+14.7435	3	16	–	18
13	45	(United Kingdom) Louis Foster	Rahal Letterman Lanigan Racing	Honda	70	+16.2034	3	13	–	17
14	76	(Netherlands) Rinus VeeKay	Juncos Hollinger Racing	Chevrolet	70	+16.8679	3	21	–	16
15	2	(United States) Josef Newgarden	Team Penske	Chevrolet	70	+18.7540	3	11	–	15
16	19	(Norway) Dennis Hauger R	Dale Coyne Racing	Honda	70	+21.2934	3	19	–	14
17	14	(United States) Santino Ferrucci	A. J. Foyt Racing	Chevrolet	70	+22.2893	3	12	–	13
18	15	(United States) Graham Rahal	Rahal Letterman Lanigan Racing	Honda	70	+24.7337	4	24	–	12
19	60	(Sweden) Felix Rosenqvist	Meyer Shank Racing	Honda	70	+33.6046	3	5	7	12
20	8	(Cayman Islands) Kyffin Simpson	Chip Ganassi Racing	Honda	70	+27.6294	5	14	–	10
21	77	(United States) Sting Ray Robb	Juncos Hollinger Racing	Chevrolet	69	+1 lap	3	23	–	9
22	47	(Germany) Mick Schumacher R	Rahal Letterman Lanigan Racing	Honda	69	+1 lap	4	17	–	8
23	18	(France) Romain Grosjean	Dale Coyne Racing	Honda	68	Contact	3	15	–	7
24	6	(United States) Nolan Siegel	Arrow McLaren	Chevrolet	68	Contact	4	22	–	6
25	21	(Denmark) Christian Rasmussen	ECR	Chevrolet	66	Mechanical	3	8	–	5
Fastest lap: (New Zealand) Scott Dixon (Chip Ganassi Racing) – 1:33.9902 (Lap 66)
Official race results

== Championship standings after the race ==
Drivers' Championship standings

	Pos.	Driver	Points
Plus	1	(United States) Kyle Kirkwood	126
Plus	2	(Spain) Álex Palou	100
Minus	3	(United States) Josef Newgarden	93
Unchanged	4	(Mexico) Pato O'Ward	93
Minus	5	(New Zealand) Scott McLaughlin	85
Point standings

Engine manufacturer standings

	Pos.	Manufacturer	Points
Plus	1	Honda	253
Minus	2	Chevrolet	225
Point standings

- Note: Only the top five positions are included.

Previous race: 2026 Good Ranchers 250	IndyCar Series; 2026 season	Next race: 2026 Children's of Alabama Indy Grand Prix
Previous race: None	Java House Grand Prix of Arlington	Next race: 2027 Java House Grand Prix of Arlington
