= Grand Prix of Arlington =

IndyCar race in Arlington, Texas

Java House Grand Prix of Arlington

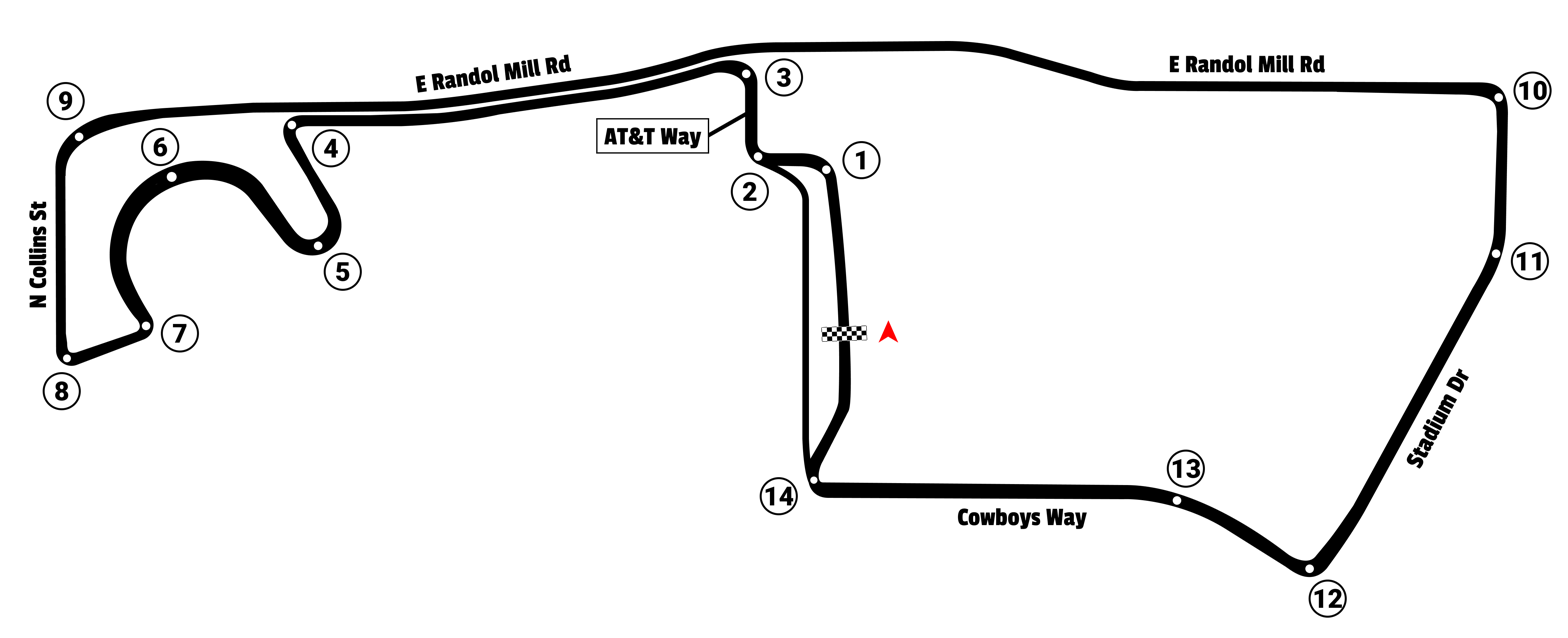

IndyCar Series
- Venue: Arlington Street Circuit, Arlington, Texas
- Corporate sponsor: Java House
- First race: 2026
- First ICS race: 2026
- Distance: 191.1 mi (307.5 km)
- Laps: 70
- Most wins (driver): Kyle Kirkwood (1)
- Most wins (team): Andretti Global (1)
- Most wins (manufacturer): Chassis: Dallara (1); Engine: Honda (1)

Circuit information
- Length: 4.394 km (2.730 mi)
- Turns: 14

The Grand Prix of Arlington (known as the Java House Grand Prix of Arlington for sponsorship reasons) is an IndyCar Series auto race first held in 2026 at the Streets of Arlington in Arlington, Texas, United States.

== History ==
The first Indy car events in the Dallas–Fort Worth area were held at Arlington Downs from 1947 through 1950, sanctioned by the American Automobile Association (AAA) Contest Board. From 1997 through 2023, Speedway Motorsports-owned Texas Motor Speedway (TMS) in Fort Worth hosted events under IndyCar sanction.

The Grand Prix of Arlington was announced on October 7, 2024, confirming initial reports the month previous. The circuit features AT&T Stadium and Globe Life Field, home of the Dallas Cowboys and Texas Rangers, respectively, as well as Choctaw Stadium. The event is billed as a partnership between IndyCar, the Cowboys and Rangers, and the City of Arlington.

=== Circuit design ===
The Arlington street circuit was designed by Tony Cottman, who has designed several Champ Car and IndyCar street circuits. The circuit is 2.730 mi (4.394 km) long and features fourteen corners. The length of the circuit makes it not only longer than any other IndyCar street circuit but also longer than any permanent road course that IndyCar visits other than the 4.048 mi (6.515 km) Road America course. Its 0.900 mi (1.448 km) main straightaway is the longest IndyCar will see on a street or road course. The number of corners on the track ties St. Petersburg for the most on an IndyCar street circuit. The circuit also features a split pit lane similar to the one found on the current Detroit street circuit.

== Past winners ==
Season	Date	Driver	Team	Chassis	Engine	Race Distance		Race Time	Average Speed (mph)	Report
Season	Date	Driver	Team	Chassis	Engine	Laps	Miles (km)	Race Time	Average Speed (mph)	Report
2026	March 15	(United States) Kyle Kirkwood	Andretti Global	Dallara	Honda	70	191.1 (307.5)	1:55:43.0642	99.086	Report

Preceded by Good Ranchers 250	IndyCar Series; Grand Prix of Arlington	Succeeded by Children's of Alabama Indy Grand Prix
