= Arlington Street Circuit =

Racetrack in Arlington, Texas

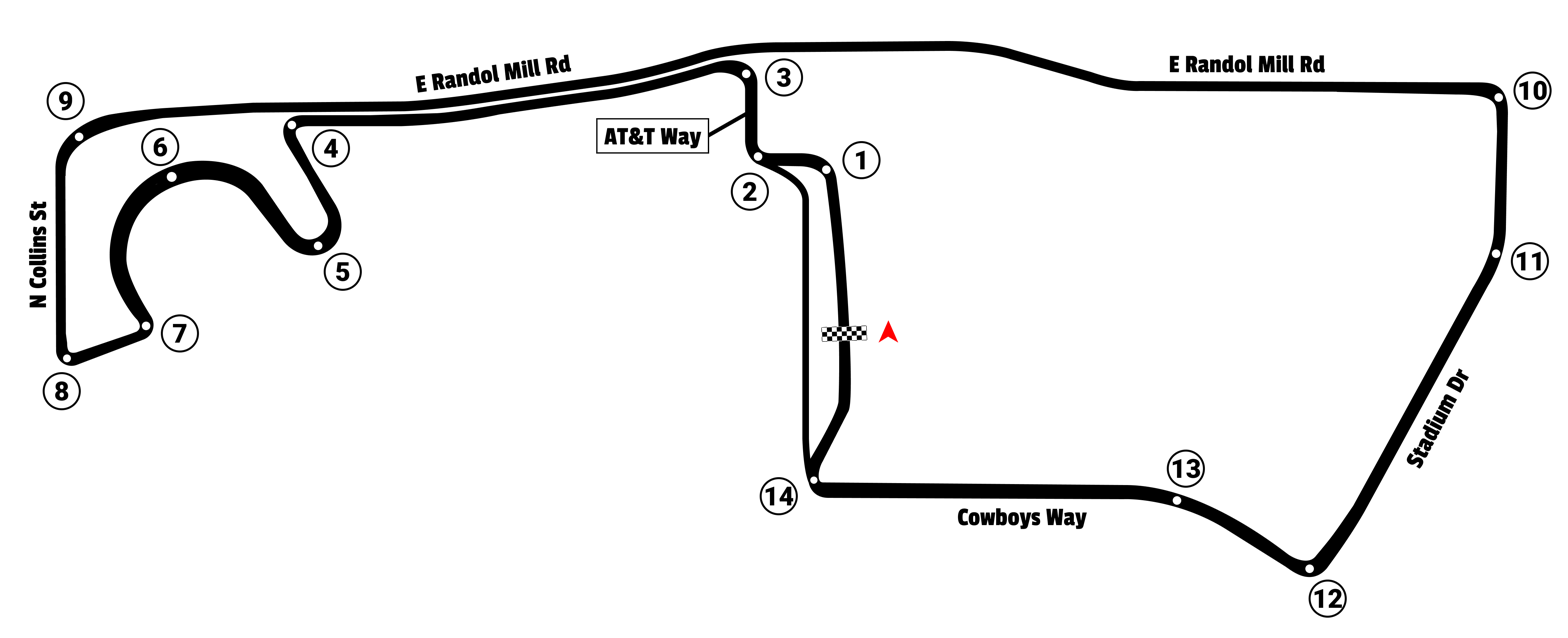
- Street Circuit (2026)
- Location: Arlington, Texas, United States
- Coordinates: 32°44′54″N 97°05′18″W
- Capacity: 100,000
- FIA Grade: 2
- Opened: 13 March 2026; 7 months ago
- Architect: Tony Cottman
- Major events: Current: IndyCar Series; Grand Prix of Arlington (2026)

Street Circuit (2026)
- Length: 2.730 mi (4.394 km)
- Turns: 14
- Race lap record: 1:33.9902 ( (New Zealand) Scott Dixon, Dallara IR-18, 2026, IndyCar)

The Arlington Street Circuit is a street circuit in Arlington, Texas, United States that hosts a round of the IndyCar Series since 2026. It sits near Globe Life Field and AT&T Stadium.

== History ==
The Grand Prix of Arlington was announced on October 7, 2024, confirming initial reports the month previous. The circuit features AT&T Stadium and Globe Life Field, home of the Dallas Cowboys and Texas Rangers, respectively, as well as Choctaw Stadium. The event is billed as a partnership between IndyCar, the Cowboys and Rangers, and the City of Arlington.

== Circuit design ==
The Arlington street circuit was designed by Tony Cottman, who has designed several Champ Car and IndyCar street circuits. The circuit is 2.730 mi (4.394 km) long and features fourteen corners. The length of the circuit makes it not only longer than any other IndyCar street circuit but also longer than any permanent road course that IndyCar visits other than the 4.048 mi (6.515 km) Road America circuit. Its 0.900 mi (1.448 km) main straightaway is the longest straight IndyCar has seen on a street or road course. The number of corners on the track ties St. Petersburg Street Circuit for the most on an IndyCar street circuit. The circuit also features a split pit lane similar to the one found on the current Detroit Street Circuit.

== Events ==
Current

- March: IndyCar Series Grand Prix of Arlington, Indy NXT, USF Pro 2000 Championship, Toyota GR Cup North America

== Lap records ==
As of March 2026, the fastest official race lap records at the Arlington Street Circuit are listed as:

Category	Time	Driver	Vehicle	Event
Street Circuit (2026): 2.730 mi (4.394 km)
IndyCar	1:33.9902	Scott Dixon	Dallara IR-18	2026 Java House Grand Prix of Arlington
Indy NXT	1:38.5998	Max Taylor	Dallara IL-15	2026 Indy NXT by Firestone Grand Prix of Arlington
USF Pro 2000	1:46.0744	Jack Jeffers	Tatuus IP-22	2026 Andersen Interior Contracting Grand Prix of Arlington
Toyota GR Cup	2:06.000	Spike Kohlbecker	Toyota GR86	2026 Arlington Toyota GR Cup North America round
