= Edward S. Minor =

American politician from Wisconsin (1840–1924)

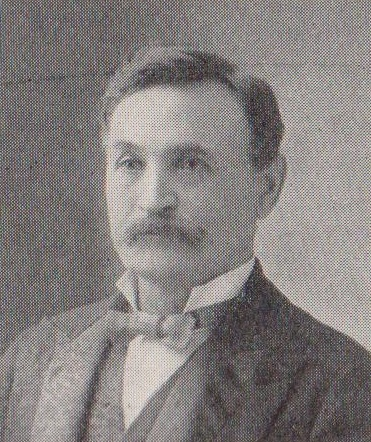

Member of the U.S. House of Representatives from Wisconsin
- In office March 4, 1895 – March 3, 1907
- Preceded by: Lyman E. Barnes (8th); Webster E. Brown (9th)
- Succeeded by: James H. Davidson (8th); Gustav Küstermann (9th)
- Constituency: 8th district (1895-1903); 9th district (1903-07)

7th & 16th Mayor of Sturgeon Bay, Wisconsin
- In office April 1918 – April 1920
- Preceded by: Nathaniel C. Garland
- Succeeded by: John Boler
- In office April 1894 – April 1895
- Preceded by: Louis Reichel
- Succeeded by: George Nelson

Member of the Wisconsin Senate from the 1st district
- In office January 1, 1883 – January 3, 1887
- Preceded by: William A. Ellis
- Succeeded by: Edward Scofield

Member of the Wisconsin State Assembly from the Door district
- In office January 5, 1880 – January 2, 1882
- Preceded by: Charles August Masse
- Succeeded by: Adelbert Delos Thorp
- In office January 7, 1878 – January 6, 1879
- Preceded by: Jarvis T. Wright
- Succeeded by: Charles August Masse

Personal details
- Born: December 13, 1840 Jefferson County, New York, U.S.
- Died: July 26, 1924 (aged 83) Sturgeon Bay, Wisconsin, U.S.
- Resting place: Bayside Cemetery, Sturgeon Bay, Wisconsin
- Party: Republican
- Spouse: Mathilda Eloiza Graham (m. 1867–1924)
- Children: Stanton Minor; Byron A. Minor; Sybil (Elwell) (Washburn); Maude (Knudtson); Ula Dorothy (Frank); Ethel (Nelson)

Military service
- Allegiance: United States
- Branch/service: United States Volunteers; Union Army
- Years of service: 1861–1865
- Rank: 1st Lieutenant, USV
- Unit: 2nd Reg. Wis. Vol. Cavalry
- Battles/wars: American Civil War

Edward Sloman Minor (December 13, 1840 – July 26, 1924) was an American businessman, Republican politician, and Wisconsin pioneer. He served six terms in the United States House of Representatives, representing northeastern Wisconsin (1895–1907). He was also the 7th and 16th mayor of Sturgeon Bay, Wisconsin, represented Door County for seven years in the Wisconsin Legislature, and served as a Union Army cavalry officer during the American Civil War.

== Early life ==
Edward S. Minor was born on December 13, 1840, in Jefferson County, New York. As a child, he moved to the Wisconsin Territory with his parents, settling in the town of Greenfield, in Milwaukee County. They soon moved to Milwaukee, where his father worked as a ship calker and Edward attended the public schools. The family moved to a homestead in Sheboygan County, Wisconsin, in 1852, where they worked as farm laborers.

In the Spring of 1858, Edward Minor went north to Door County, Wisconsin, walking from Baileys Harbor to Fish Creek to claim a plot of land for the family from the United States General Land Office. The rest of the family joined him there in July.

== Civil War service ==
At the outbreak of the American Civil War, Minor volunteered for service in the Union Army and was enrolled as a private in Company G of the 2nd Wisconsin Cavalry Regiment. The 2nd Wisconsin Cavalry served in the western theater of the war and west of the Mississippi.

He was promoted to corporal, and sergeant, and re-enlisted as a veteran with the regiment after the expiration of his three-year enlistment. At the end of the war, he was commissioned as a second lieutenant, and was then promoted to first lieutenant on July 29, 1865. He mustered out with the regiment in November 1865.

== Political career ==
After the war, Minor worked as a merchant in Fish Creek, dealing in timber products.

He was elected to the Wisconsin State Assembly in 1877, representing Door County in the 31st Wisconsin Legislature. He did not run for re-election in 1878, but ran again in 1879 and 1880, and won both elections.

In 1882, Minor won a four-year term in the Wisconsin State Senate. He represented the 1st State Senate district, which then comprised most of the northeast quadrant of the state, and was elected president pro tempore of the Senate for the 1885 session.

During his earlier Assembly term, he supported the construction of the Sturgeon Bay Ship Canal, and during his Senate term he was appointed superintendent of the canal and moved to Sturgeon Bay, Wisconsin. He remained in this office until 1891, and served as a member of the Wisconsin Fish Commission for four years. He was then elected mayor of Sturgeon Bay in 1894.

== Congress ==
Later that year, he was nominated as the Republican candidate for the United States House of Representatives in Wisconsin's 8th congressional district. He went on to defeat incumbent Democrat Lyman E. Barnes in the 1894 general election. He was subsequently re-elected three times in this district, in 1896, 1898, and 1900. After the 1900 United States census, another congressional district was added to Wisconsin's delegation, and in the redistricting, Minor's county was moved from the 8th congressional district to the 9th. Minor was elected to two more terms in Congress representing the 9th congressional district. In 1906, however, Minor was defeated in the primary election by Gustav Küstermann, who went on to succeed him in 1907.

During his time in Congress, he was active in the work of the House Committee on Merchant Marine and Fisheries, especially concerning funding for improvements of rivers and harbors. He was chairman of the Committee on Expenditures for the Department of the Interior during the 58th and 59th congresses. He was well known among the political class in Washington, D.C., and was described as a trusted friend of Theodore Roosevelt.

== Later years ==
Minor's grave at Bayside Cemetery

After leaving office, he was appointed postmaster at Sturgeon Bay from 1911 through 1915, and was elected to another term as mayor in 1918. He died at his home in Sturgeon Bay on July 26, 1924, after a month-long decline in his health. He was interred at Sturgeon Bay's Bayside Cemetery.

== Personal life and family ==
Edward S. Minor was one of five children born to Martin Minor and his wife Abigail (née St. Ores). The Minors were descendants of early British colonists to the Massachusetts Bay Colony.

Edward Minor married Mathilda Eloiza "Tillie" Graham in 1867. Tillie was the daughter of Oliver Perry Graham, another Door County pioneer who erected the first lumber mill at Sturgeon Bay. Edward and Tillie had at least six children, though only five survived him. His eldest son, Stanton, worked as his private secretary during his years in Congress and was an unsuccessful candidate for Wisconsin State Assembly.

He was a member of the Independent Order of Odd Fellows, the Military Order of the Loyal Legion of the United States, and the Grand Army of the Republic.

== Electoral history ==
=== Wisconsin Assembly (1877, 1879, 1880) ===
Wisconsin Assembly, Door District Election, 1877
Party	Candidate	Votes	%	±%
General Election, November 6, 1877
Republican	Edward S. Minor	554	56.47%	+32.77%
Democratic	George Basford	427	43.53%	+1.33%
Plurality		127	12.95%	-5.55%
Total votes		981	100.0%	-35.42%
Republican gain from Democratic				

Wisconsin Assembly, Door District Election, 1879
Party	Candidate	Votes	%	±%
General Election, November 4, 1879
Republican	Edward S. Minor	527	52.02%	−8.47%
Greenback	Moses Kilgore	391	38.60%	−0.91%
Democratic	Grary Pinney	95	9.38%	
Plurality		136	13.43%	-7.56%
Total votes		1,013	100.0%	-28.41%
Republican hold				

Wisconsin Assembly, Door District Election, 1880
Party	Candidate	Votes	%	±%
General Election, November 2, 1880
Republican	Edward S. Minor (incumbent)	1,191	56.45%	+4.42%
Democratic	J. T. Wright	856	40.57%	+31.19%
Greenback	Rufus M. Wright	63	2.99%	−35.61%
Plurality		335	15.88%	+2.45%
Total votes		2,110	100.0%	+108.29%
Republican hold				

=== Wisconsin Senate (1882) ===
Wisconsin Senate, 1st District Election, 1882
Party	Candidate	Votes	%	±%
General Election, November 7, 1882
Republican	Edward S. Minor	5,072	55.63%	−2.73%
Democratic	John Fetzer	4,046	44.37%	
Plurality		1,026	11.25%	-5.46%
Total votes		9,118	100.0%	-9.34%
Republican hold				

=== U.S. House of Representatives, 8th district (1894, 1896, 1898, 1900) ===
Year	Date	Elected				Defeated				Total	Plurality
1894	Nov. 6	Edward S. Minor	Republican	19,902	54.22%	Lyman E. Barnes	Dem.	15,522	42.29%	36,703	4,380
1894	Nov. 6	Edward S. Minor	Republican	19,902	54.22%	John Faville	Proh.	949	2.59%	36,703	4,380
1894	Nov. 6	Edward S. Minor	Republican	19,902	54.22%	A. J. Larrabee	Peo.	330	0.90%	36,703	4,380
1896	Nov. 3	Edward S. Minor (inc)	Republican	26,471	60.30%	George W. Cate	Dem.	16,845	38.37%	43,896	9,626
1896	Nov. 3	Edward S. Minor (inc)	Republican	26,471	60.30%	John W. Evans	Proh.	580	1.32%	43,896	9,626
1898	Nov. 8	Edward S. Minor (inc)	Republican	16,910	54.19%	Philip Sheridan	Dem.	13,668	43.80%	31,207	3,242
1898	Nov. 8	Edward S. Minor (inc)	Republican	16,910	54.19%	John W. Evans	Proh.	629	2.02%	31,207	3,242
1900	Nov. 6	Edward S. Minor (inc)	Republican	25,263	60.15%	Nathan E. Morgan	Dem.	16,740	39.85%	42,003	8,523

=== U.S. House of Representatives, 9th district (1902, 1904) ===
Year	Date	Elected				Defeated				Total	Plurality
1902	Nov. 4	Edward S. Minor	Republican	15,958	57.08%	Edward Decker	Dem.	11,479	41.06%	27,955	4,479
1902	Nov. 4	Edward S. Minor	Republican	15,958	57.08%	T. W. Lomas	Proh.	518	1.85%	27,955	4,479
1904	Nov. 8	Edward S. Minor (inc)	Republican	19,764	58.12%	Robert J. McGeehan	Dem.	13,124	38.59%	34,005	6,640
1904	Nov. 8	Edward S. Minor (inc)	Republican	19,764	58.12%	Joseph W. Harris	Soc.D.	667	1.96%	34,005	6,640
1904	Nov. 8	Edward S. Minor (inc)	Republican	19,764	58.12%	Charles W. Loomis	Proh.	450	1.32%	34,005	6,640

Wisconsin State Assembly
Preceded by Jarvis T. Wright	Member of the Wisconsin State Assembly from the Door district January 7, 1878 – January 6, 1879	Succeeded by Charles August Masse
Preceded by Charles August Masse	Member of the Wisconsin State Assembly from the Door district January 5, 1880 – January 2, 1882	Succeeded by Adelbert Delos Thorp
Wisconsin Senate
Preceded by William A. Ellis	Member of the Wisconsin Senate from the 1st district January 1, 1883 – January 3, 1887	Succeeded by Edward Scofield
U.S. House of Representatives
Preceded by Lyman E. Barnes	Member of the U.S. House of Representatives from Wisconsin's 8th congressional district March 4, 1895 - March 3, 1903	Succeeded by James H. Davidson
Preceded by Webster E. Brown	Member of the U.S. House of Representatives from Wisconsin's 9th congressional district March 4, 1903 - March 3, 1907	Succeeded by Gustav Küstermann
Political offices
Preceded by Louis Reichel	Mayor of Sturgeon Bay, Wisconsin; April 1894 – April 1895	Succeeded by George Nelson
Preceded by Nathaniel C. Garland	Mayor of Sturgeon Bay, Wisconsin; April 1918 – April 1920	Succeeded by John Boler
