= Enos Eastman =

19th century American politician

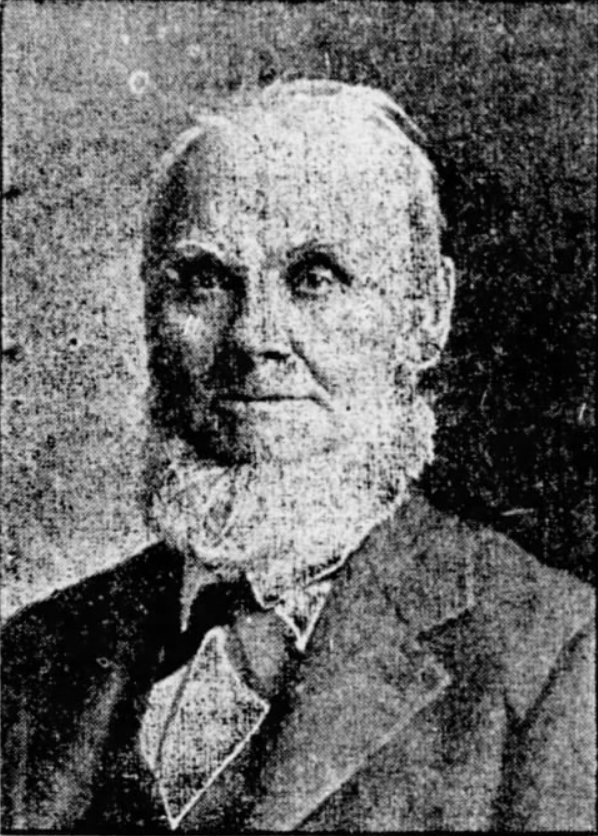

Member of the Wisconsin Senate from the 1st district
- In office January 4, 1875 – January 1, 1877
- Preceded by: Patrick H. O'Rourk
- Succeeded by: George Grimmer

Member of the Wisconsin State Assembly from the Sheboygan 2nd district
- In office January 2, 1871 – January 1, 1872
- Preceded by: J. Henry McNeel
- Succeeded by: Patrick H. O'Rourk

Personal details
- Born: October 27, 1821 Ellisburg, New York, U.S.
- Died: June 4, 1908 (aged 86) Plymouth, Wisconsin, U.S.
- Resting place: Union Cemetery, Plymouth, Wisconsin
- Party: Democratic
- Spouse: Miriam Carpenter (m. 1844–1907)
- Children: Vashti Louisa (Gardner)^{(b. 1844; died 1916)}; Sarah Maria Eastman^{(b. 1848; died 1869)}; Miriam Elizabeth (Warden)^{(b. 1855; died 1884)}; Orilla May (Zerler)^{(b. 1859; died 1939)}; Charles Douglas Eastman^{(b. 1861; died 1944)}; Enos Eugene Eastman^{(b. 1865; died 1950)}
- Relatives: La Fayette Eastman (brother); Allen F. Warden (son-in-law)
- Occupation: Farmer, politician

Enos Eastman Jr. (October 27, 1821 – June 4, 1908) was an American farmer, Democratic politician, and Wisconsin pioneer. He served two years in the Wisconsin Senate (1875 & 1876) and one year in the Wisconsin State Assembly (1871), representing Sheboygan County.

== Biography ==
Enos Eastman was born on October 27, 1821, in Ellisburg, New York. He received a common school and academic education and came west to Wisconsin in 1849, following his brother La Fayette, who had arrived a year earlier. He settled a farm adjacent to his brother's property in the town of Plymouth, Sheboygan County, Wisconsin, where he resided for the rest of his life.

Eastman became active in local politics and served on the town board of supervisors. In 1870, he was elected to the Wisconsin State Assembly, running on the Democratic Party ticket. His district comprised much of the western half of Sheboygan County. In 1872 he was elected chairman of the town board and served as an ex officio member of the county Board of Supervisors.

He was elected to the Wisconsin Senate in 1874, running in what was then the 1st Senate district, comprising all of Sheboygan County.

Through his agricultural interests, Eastman became involved in cooperative cheese manufacturing. In 1882 he became president of the newly organized Sheboygan County Dairy Board of Trade. His name was mentioned several times as a potential Democratic candidate for governor in the 1880s, but he never ran.

Enos Eastman died at Plymouth on June 4, 1908, at age 87, after a long period of declining health.

== Personal life and family ==
Enos Eastman Jr. was one of at least six children born to Enos Eastman Sr. and his first wife Vashti (née Green). The Eastman family were descended from Roger Eastman, who was born in Wales and emigrated to the Massachusetts Bay Colony in 1638 aboard a ship named the Confidence. Enos Jr.'s elder brother La Fayette Eastman was also a member of the Wisconsin State Assembly.

Enos Jr. married Miriam Carpenter on January 11, 1844. They had at least six children together. Their daughter third daughter, Miriam, married Allen F. Warden, who was also a member of the Wisconsin Assembly.

== See also ==
- Enos Eastman at Find a Grave

Wisconsin State Assembly
Preceded by J. Henry McNeel	Member of the Wisconsin State Assembly from the Sheboygan 2nd district January 2, 1871 – January 1, 1872	Succeeded by Patrick H. O'Rourk
Wisconsin Senate
Preceded by Patrick H. O'Rourk	Member of the Wisconsin Senate from the 1st district January 4, 1875 – January 1, 1877	Succeeded by George Grimmer
