= Admiral Gregory =

Admiral Gregory may refer to:

- David Gregory (Royal Navy officer) (1909–1975), British Royal Navy vice admiral
- Francis Gregory (1789–1866), U.S. Navy rear admiral
- Frederik Alexander Adolf Gregory (1814–1891), Royal Netherlands Navy vice admiral
- Katherine L. Gregory (born 1951), U.S. Navy rear admiral
- Michael Gregory (Royal Navy officer) (born 1945), British Royal Navy rear admiral
