= Adelbert Delos Thorp =

19th-century American politician

Adelbert D. Thorp

County Treasurer of Door County, Wisconsin
- In office January 7, 1895 – January 4, 1897
- Preceded by: Lyman D. Mowry
- Succeeded by: Joseph G. Dalemont

Sheriff of Door County, Wisconsin
- In office January 2, 1893 – January 7, 1895
- Preceded by: Arnold Wagener
- Succeeded by: Clem Killman
- In office November 1887 – January 7, 1889
- Appointed by: Jeremiah McLain Rusk
- Preceded by: Thomas Scott
- Succeeded by: John Keogh

Sergeant-at-Arms of the Wisconsin Senate
- In office January 10, 1883 – January 14, 1885
- Preceded by: A. T. Glaze
- Succeeded by: Hubert Wolcott

Member of the Wisconsin State Assembly from the Door district
- In office January 2, 1882 – January 1, 1883
- Preceded by: Edward S. Minor
- Succeeded by: Christopher Leonhardt

County Clerk of Door County, Wisconsin
- In office January 1, 1877 – January 3, 1881
- Preceded by: Charles A. Masse
- Succeeded by: George Nelson

Personal details
- Born: April 15, 1844 Oswego, New York, U.S.
- Died: February 10, 1919 (aged 74) Sturgeon Bay, Wisconsin, U.S.
- Resting place: Bayside Cemetery, Sturgeon Bay
- Party: Republican
- Spouse: Ellen Augusta Durkee (m. 1869; died 1893)
- Children: Adelbert D. "Bert" Thorp^{(b. 1869; died 1937)}; Guy Carlton Thorp^{(b. 1877; died 1878)}; Gail Edith (Bell)^{(b. 1880; died 1965)}; Edna Thorp
- Occupation: Farmer, fishing

Military service
- Allegiance: United States
- Branch/service: United States Volunteers; Union Army
- Years of service: 1861–1865
- Rank: 1st Sergeant, USV
- Unit: 3rd Reg. Wis. Vol. Infantry; 43rd Reg. Wis. Vol. Infantry
- Battles/wars: American Civil War

Adelbert Delos Thorp (April 15, 1844 – February 10, 1919) was an American farmer, fisherman, and Wisconsin pioneer. He was a member of the Wisconsin State Assembly, representing Door County in the 1882 session, and later served as sergeant-at-arms of the Wisconsin Senate. In historical documents, his first name is sometimes given as "Albert", and his middle name is sometimes spelled "Deloss".

== Biography ==
Adelbert D. Thorp was born in Oswego, New York, on April 15, 1844. He came to the Wisconsin Territory with his family as a child in 1846, and settled at Rubicon, in Dodge County, where he was raised and educated. They moved to Monroe County, Wisconsin, in 1860.

At the outbreak of the American Civil War, Thorp volunteered for service with the Union Army. He was enrolled as a private in Company A of the 3rd Wisconsin Infantry Regiment. He served nearly two years with the regiment before being discharged in March 1863 due to disability. He re-enlisted in the Fall of 1864 and was assigned to Company K of the 43rd Wisconsin Infantry Regiment, where he was promoted to first sergeant. He mustered out with the 43rd Wisconsin Infantry in June 1865.

After the war, Thorp returned to Monroe County, where he was married in 1869. In 1871, he moved to Egg Harbor, in Door County, where he remained for most of the rest of his life. At Egg Harbor, Thorp became involved in the fishing business and was elected town chairman, serving two one-year terms. He was then elected county clerk in 1876 and re-elected in 1878.

In 1881, he was elected to the Wisconsin State Assembly, running on the Republican Party ticket. He served in the 35th Wisconsin Legislature and was a member of the committee on incorporations. He did not run for re-election in 1882. However, at the start of the 1883 session of the Legislature, the Wisconsin Senate elected him to serve as their sergeant-at-arms. He continued as an employee of the Senate in the 1885 session, working as proofreader.

In 1887, Thorp was appointed sheriff of Door County by Governor Jeremiah McLain Rusk, following the death of the incumbent, Thomas Scott. Thorp served the remainder of Scott's term, and was later elected to another term in 1892. In 1894, he ran instead for county treasurer and served one term in that office.

In 1897, Thorp was appointed special agent for the United States General Land Office in Spokane, Washington. He served there for eight years before retiring due to poor health.

Thorp died in February 1919 at the home of his daughter in Sturgeon Bay, Wisconsin, after a long illness.

== Personal life and family ==
Thorp married Ellen Augusta Durkee in on March 2, 1869, at Tomah, Wisconsin. They had at least four children together before her death in 1893.

== Electoral history ==
=== Wisconsin Assembly (1881) ===
Wisconsin Assembly, Door District Election, 1881
Party	Candidate	Votes	%	±%
General Election, November 8, 1881
Republican	Adelbert D. Thorp	655	52.40%	−4.05%
Independent	Henry Reynolds	595	47.60%	
Plurality		60	4.80%	-11.08%
Total votes		1,250	100.0%	-40.76%
Republican hold				

Wisconsin State Assembly
Preceded by Edward S. Minor	Member of the Wisconsin State Assembly from the Door district January 2, 1882 – January 1, 1883	Succeeded by Christopher Leonhardt
Wisconsin Senate
Preceded by A. T. Glaze	Sergeant-at-Arms of the Wisconsin Senate; January 10, 1883 – January 14, 1885	Succeeded by Hubert Wolcott
Political offices
Preceded by Charles A. Masse	County Clerk of Door County, Wisconsin; January 1, 1877 – January 3, 1881	Succeeded by George Nelson
Preceded by Lyman D. Mowry	County Treasurer of Door County, Wisconsin; January 7, 1895 – January 4, 1897	Succeeded by Joseph G. Dalemont
Legal offices
Preceded by Arnold Wagener	Sheriff of Door County, Wisconsin; January 2, 1893 – January 7, 1895	Succeeded by Clem Killman
