= Mary Bannister Willard =

American educator and temperance advocate

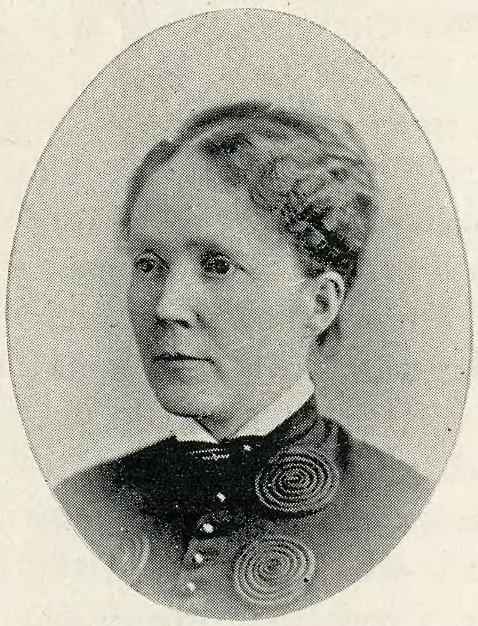
- Born: Mary H. Bannister; September 18, 1841; Fairfield, New York, U.S.
- Died: July 7, 1912 (aged 70)
- Education: Northwestern Female College at Evanston
- Spouse: Oliver Atherton Willard (m. 1862; died 1878)
- Children: 4
- Relatives: John Bannister (uncle); Theodore Conkey (uncle); Alonzo Kimball (uncle); Frances E. Willard (sister-in-law)

Mary H. Bannister Willard (September 18, 1841 – July 7, 1912) was an American editor, temperance worker, and educator from the U.S. state of New York. She was the founder of the American Home School for Girls in Berlin, Germany, earlier having served as editor of the Post and Mail (Chicago, Illinois) and The Union Signal (Woman's Christian Temperance Union).

== Early years and education ==
Mary Bannister was born in Fairfield, New York, September 18, 1841. She was the daughter of Rev. Henry Bannister, D.D., a distinguished scholar and Methodist divine, and his wife, Mrs. Lucy Kimball Bannister. In the infancy of Mary, their oldest daughter, the father became principal of Cazenovia Seminary, and her childhood and early youth were spent as a pupil in that institution. When she was fifteen, the family removed to Evanston, Illinois, when her father became Professor of Hebrew in Garrett Biblical Institute, the western theological school of the Methodist church.

Willard graduated with honor from the Northwestern Female College at Evanston, at the age of 18.

== Career ==
The year after graduating, she went to Tennessee as a teacher, but her career was cut short by the approach of the American Civil War. On 3 July 1862, she married Oliver A. Willard (born Churchville, New York, 1835) who had in 1861 from the Garrett Biblical Institute. She went with her husband to his first pastorate, in Edgerton, Wisconsin. In the following year, they removed to Denver, Colorado, where her husband founded a Methodist church, and became presiding elder at the age of 27 years. Two years later, the family, consisting of the parents, one son and one daughter, returned to Evanston, where they made their home for several years, and where another son and another daughter were added to their number.

In 1872, the husband became connected with the editorial department of the Evening Mail. On consolidation of this paper with the Evening Post, he became managing editor of the Post and Mail, and president of the Post Stock Company. Though Willard was a gifted writer, she wrote little during those years, excepting for home study with her husband. His death occurred at the Palmer House, Chicago, March 17, 1878, after an illness of less than three days.

The husband's sudden death was an overwhelming bereavement, and left to Willard the responsibility of conducting his paper, Post and Mail, which she assumed with the assistance of her husband's sister, Frances E. Willard. The financial burden proving too heavy, it was relinquished, and not long afterward Willard was called to assume the editorship of a new paper, the Signal, the organ of the Illinois Woman's Christian Temperance Union. Several years of successful work as editor and temperance worker displayed her abilities, both as an editor and as organizer and platform speaker. The Signal under her leadership came quickly to the front, and it was said that no other paper in the US was better edited.

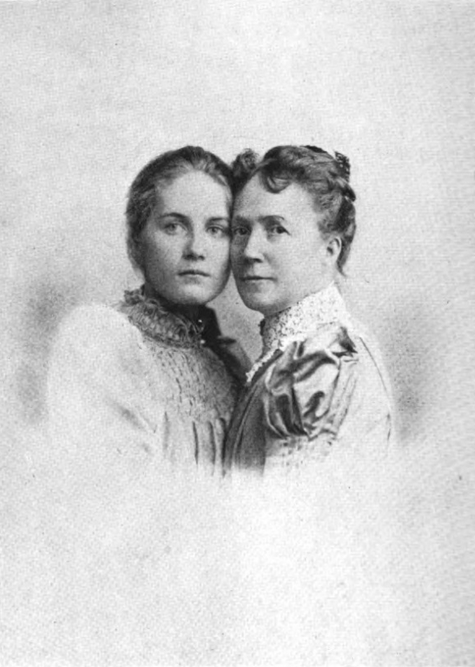
Mary Bannister Willard and daughter (r-l)

In 1881, she made her first trip to Europe. Successfully editing the Union Signal for several years afterward, her health became impaired, and with her two daughters, she spent a year in Berlin, Germany. In the autumn of 1886, she opened in that city her American Home School for Girls. In the years of her residence in Europe, she served as a representative of total abstinence reform.

She died in 1912 in New York City.
