= Henry Krumrey =

American politician (1852–1922)

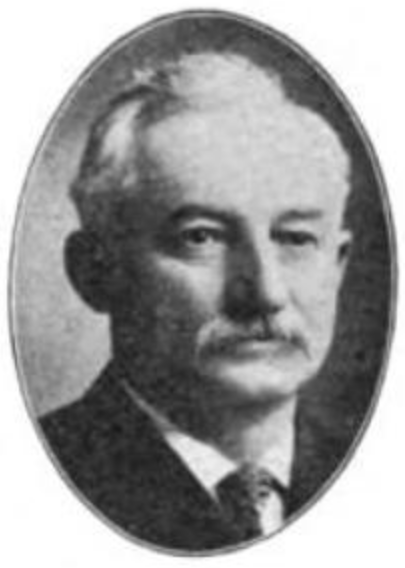

Member of the Wisconsin State Senate
- In office 1908–1912
- Constituency: District 20

Member of the Wisconsin State Assembly
- In office 1900–1902

Personal details
- Born: 1852 Plymouth, Sheboygan County, Wisconsin
- Died: January 13, 1922 (aged 69–70)
- Party: Republican
- Occupation: Farmer, businessman, politician

Henry Krumrey (1852 – January 13, 1922) was an American farmer, businessman, and politician.

== Biography ==
Born in Plymouth, Sheboygan County, Wisconsin, Krumrey was a farmer and livestock dealer. In 1912, he helped found the Wisconsin Cheese Production Federation. Krumrey was active in the Republican Party as a presidential elector in the United States presidential election of 1900 and a delegate to the Republican Party Convention of 1908. In Plymouth, Krumrey served as supervisor, town chairman, and treasurer. He also served on the school board as one of the directors. In 1901, Krumrey served in the Wisconsin State Assembly and then in the Wisconsin State Senate from 1909 to 1913. In 1922, Krumrey committed suicide by hanging himself at his summer cottage in Crystal Lake, Illinois.
