= Doesburg =

- Municipality
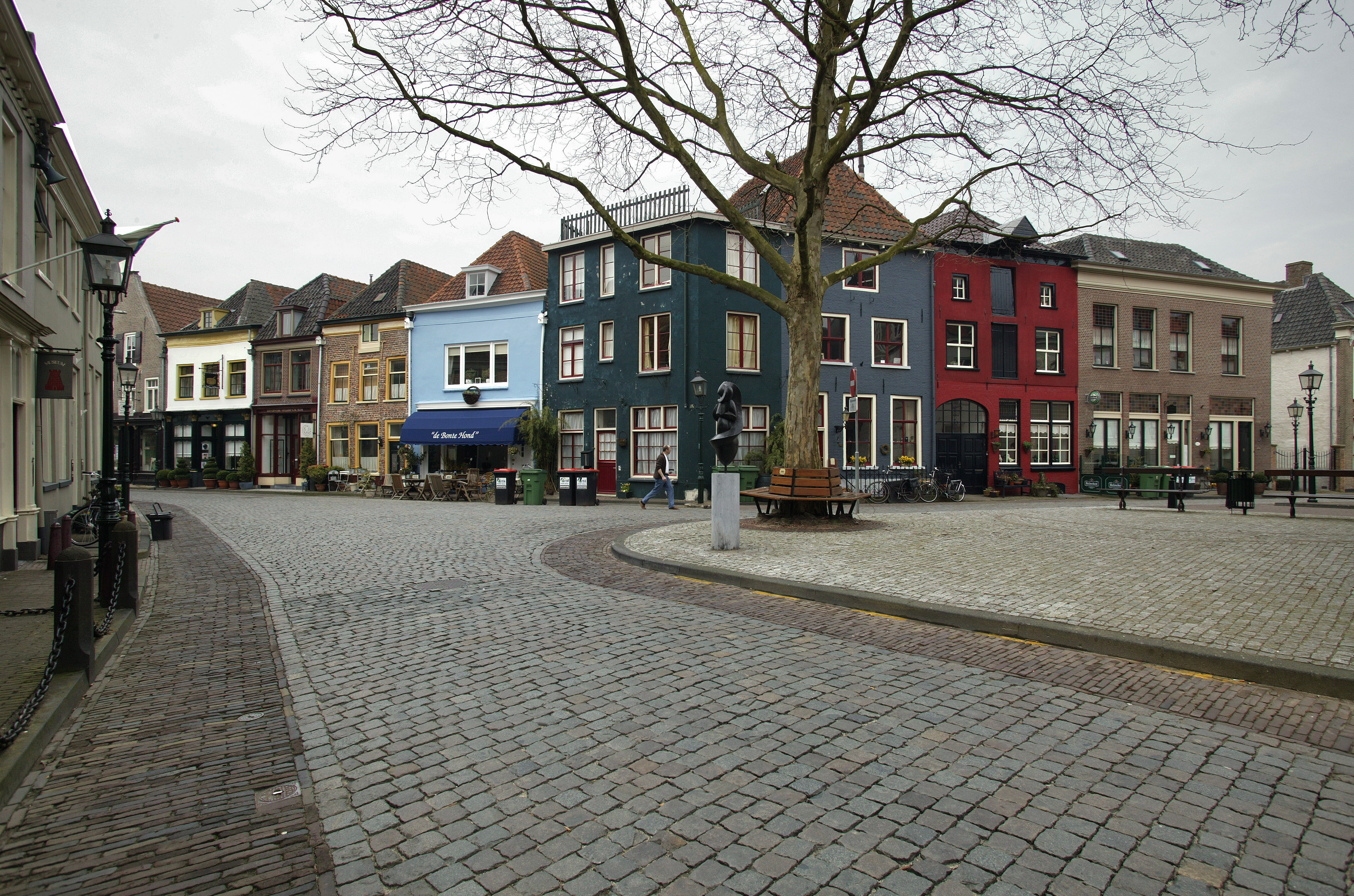
- Square in Doesburg

- Flag Coat of arms

- Location in Gelderland

- Location within the Netherlands Location within Europe
- Coordinates: 52°1′N 6°8′E
- Country: Netherlands
- Province: Gelderland

Government
  - Body: Municipal council
  - Mayor: Rob Bats (VVD)

Area
  - Total: 12.96 km^{2} (5.00 sq mi)
  - Land: 11.53 km^{2} (4.45 sq mi)
  - Water: 1.43 km^{2} (0.55 sq mi)
- Elevation: 13 m (43 ft)

Population (January 2021)
  - Total: 11,064
  - Density: 960/km^{2} (2,500/sq mi)
- Demonym: Doesburger
- Time zone: UTC+1 (CET)
  - Summer (DST): UTC+2 (CEST)
- Postcode: 6980–6984
- Area code: 0313
- Website: www.doesburg.nl

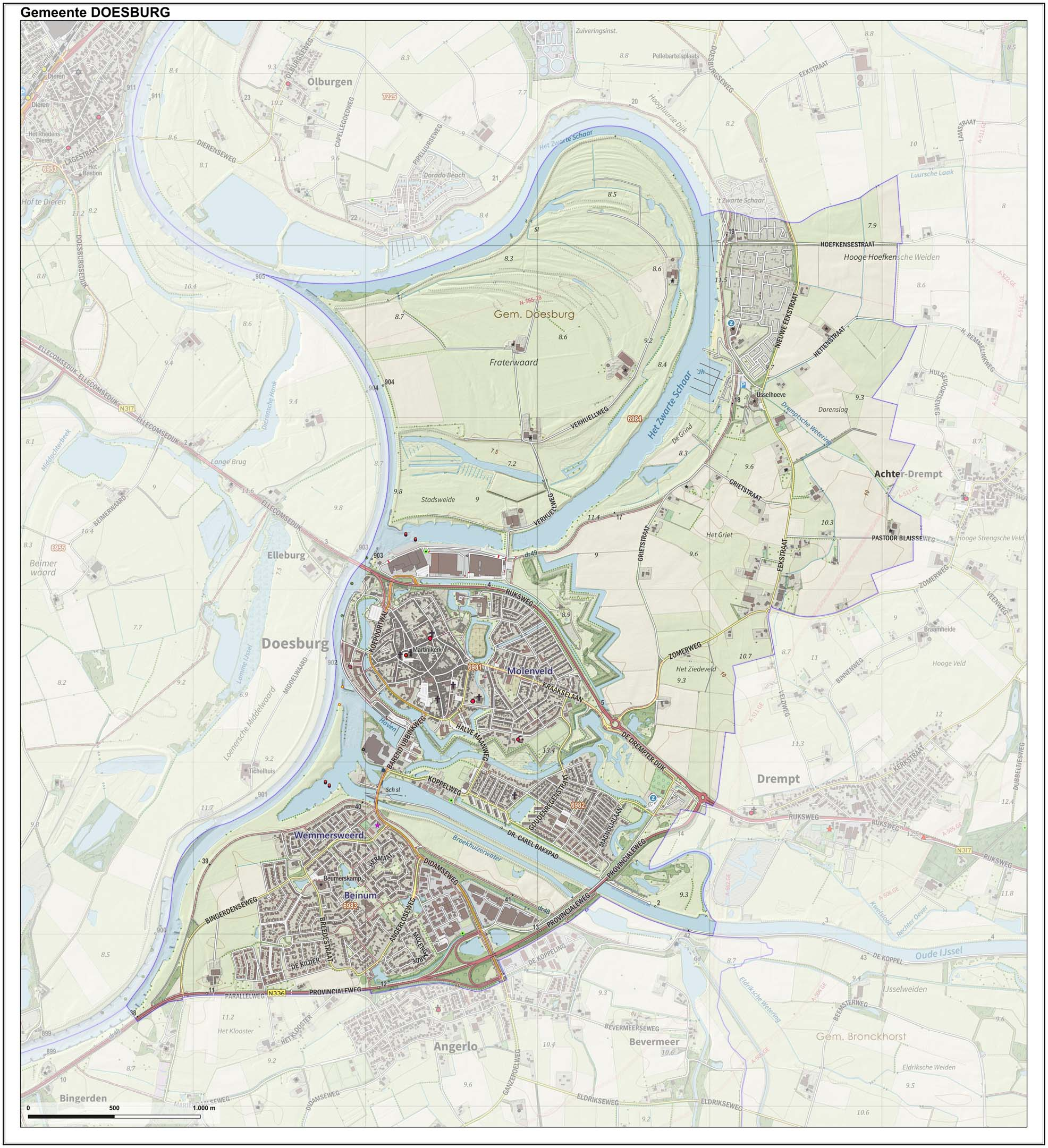
Map of Doesburg, June 2015

Doesburg (Dutch pronunciation: [ˈduzbʏr(ə)x]) is a municipality and a city in the eastern Netherlands in the province of Gelderland. Doesburg received city rights in 1237 and had a population of 11,064 in 2021. The city is situated on the right bank of the River IJssel at its confluence with the River Oude IJssel. It is part of the Arnhem-Nijmegen Green Metropolitan Region (Dutch: Groene Metropoolregio Arnhem-Nijmegen), which aids planning and development in the region's eighteen municipalities.

== History ==
Doesburg received city rights in 1237, one year later than the neighbouring town of Doetinchem. Because of its strategic position along the Oude IJssel and Gelderse IJssel, Doesburg has been an important fortified city for a long time. Its fortification made Doesburg an important economic and administrative city. The Martinikerk, the main church in Doesburg, is 94 meters tall. For many reasons, including the IJssel's decreasing depth, the prosperity of Doesburg stagnated after the 15th century. Due to its position near the IJssel, Doesburg became the location of military conflicts, it was captured by Willem IV van den Bergh and besieged 100 years later by the French. Doesburg became a quiet provincial town, and remained so until after the second world war. The city was protected in 1974, designated as a historic town.

As Doesburg was officially a fortified city up to 1923, it could not be expanded. After the second world war the city grew rapidly. In the 1950s, a suburb called Molenveld (English: mill field) was built on the Eastern side of the city. In the 1970s and 1980s a suburb called Beinum was built to the south of the Oude IJssel, and Campstede was subsequently built to the south of Beinum. At the beginning of the 21st century the construction of a new area at the IJsselkade was started with 44 houses and 124 apartments designed by the Italian architect Adolfo Natalini. In 2007, construction of a hotel called "Noabers" was started. After a few months it was insolvent, but was taken over and reopened a year later.

== Tourism ==
In the north of Doesburg there are several camp-sites where in the high season 4000 visitors stay each year. The historical city centre has museums and monuments that draw thousands of tourists every year. Major attractions include the Gildehof, the Doesburgse mustard factory and 'De Waag', possibly the oldest public house in the Netherlands.

== Industry ==
Doesburg has a number of business parks. These include the Verhuellweg on the north side of the city, and Beinum-Oost and Beinum-West to the east of the city. Along the Gelderse Ijssel are an iron foundry and a concrete call centre, as well as a builder of motor yachts.

The city used to be an important location for the production of mustard, as testified by the local Mustard museum.

== Well-known Doesburgers ==
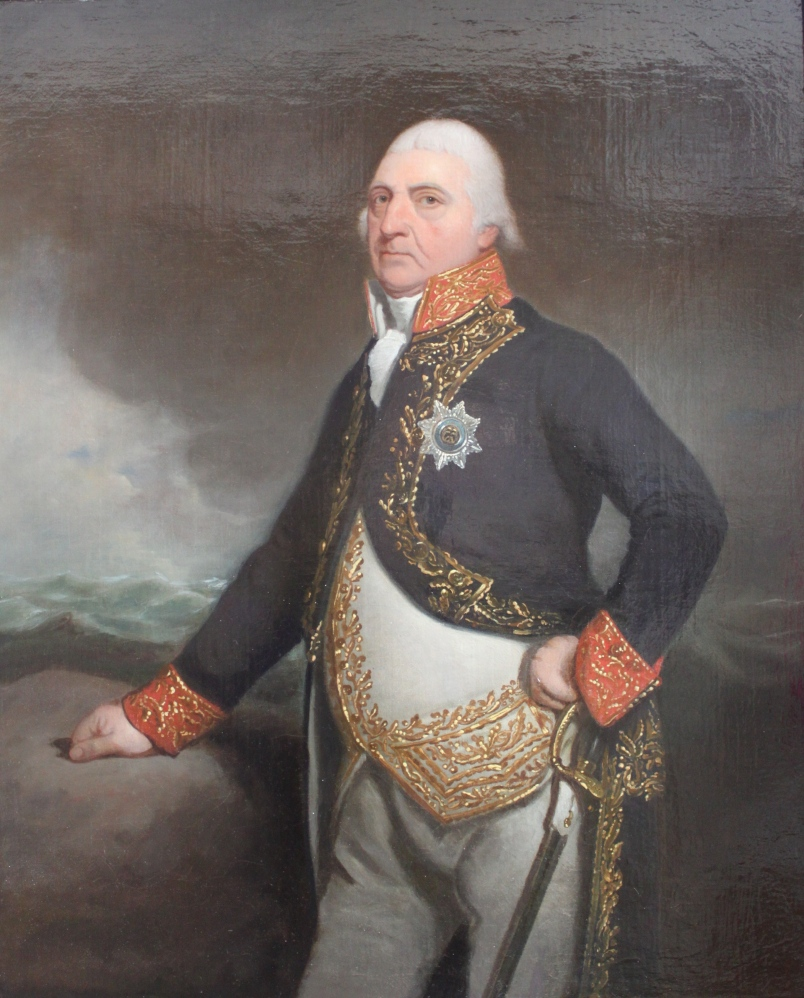
Jan Hendrik van Kinsbergen

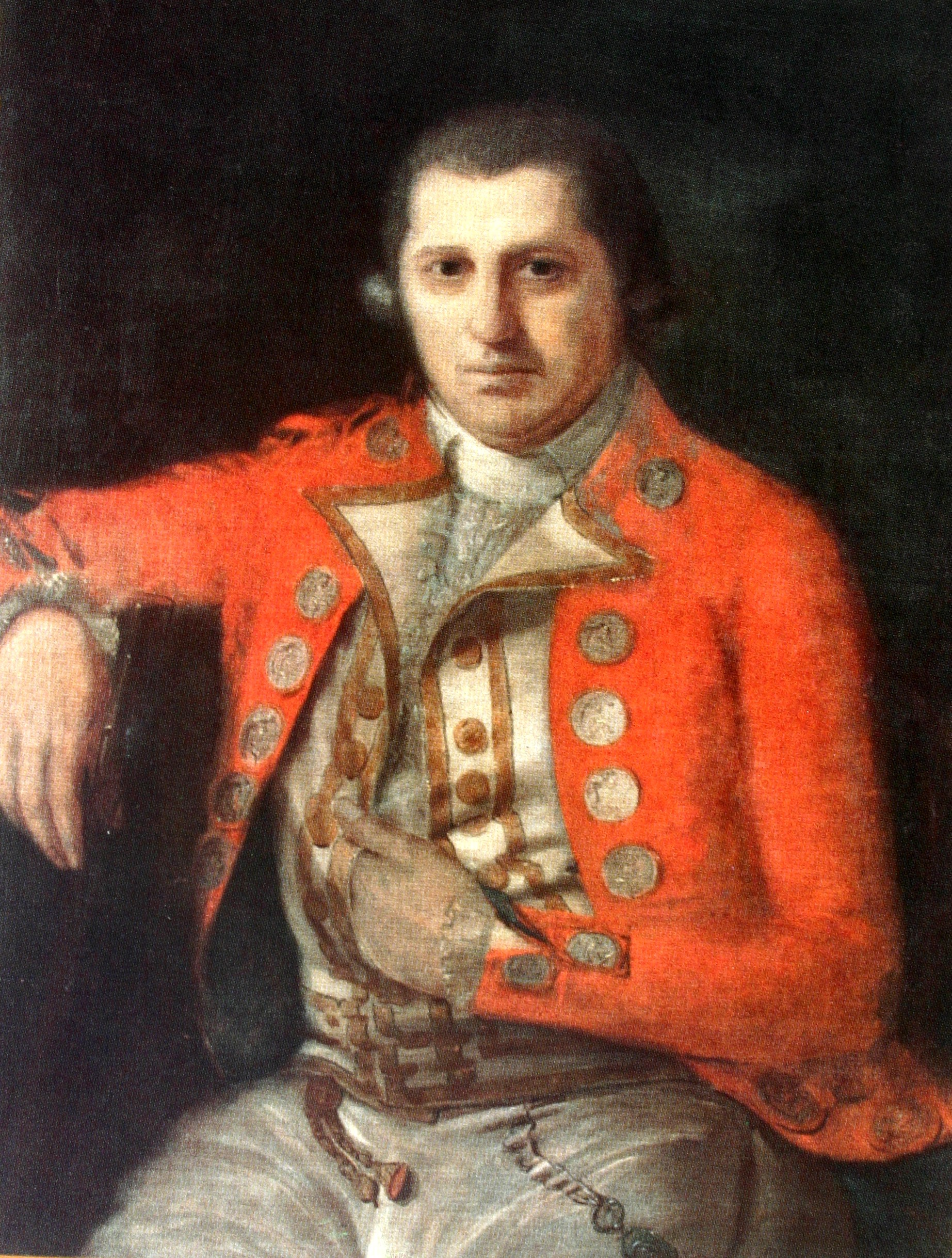
Robert Jacob Gordon, 1780

- Peter of Dusburg (circa 1260–1326) a Priest-Brother and chronicler of the Teutonic Knights
- Jan Hendrik van Kinsbergen (1735 in Doesburg – 1819) Count of Doggersbank, was a Dutch naval officer and sea hero
- Robert Jacob Gordon (1743 in Doesburg – 1795) explorer, soldier, artist, naturalist and linguist of Scottish descent
- Carel Hendrik Ver Huell (also Verhuell) (born 1764 in Doetinchem – 1845) a Dutch, and later French, admiral and statesman
- Johan Conrad van Hasselt (1797 in Doesburg – 1823) physician, zoologist, botanist and mycologist
- Willem Anne Schimmelpenninck van der Oye (1800 in Doesburg – 1872) politician
- Frederik Alexander Adolf Gregory (1814 in Doesburg – 1891) a Dutch Vice admiral
- Charles August Masse (born 1838 in Doesburg – 1913) a member of the Wisconsin State Assembly
- Theo Colenbrander (1841 in Doesburg – 1930) architect, ceramist, plaque painter and designer
- Kees Luesink (1953–2014 in Doesburg) a politician, Mayor of Doesburg from 2008
- Elbert Roest (born 1954) a historian, politician and former teacher, Doesburg municipal councillor 1992 to 2002
- Clemens Cornielje (born 1958 in Lobith) politician and former political consultant and educator
- Agnes Kant (born 1967) a retired politician, lives in Doesburg

== Gallery ==
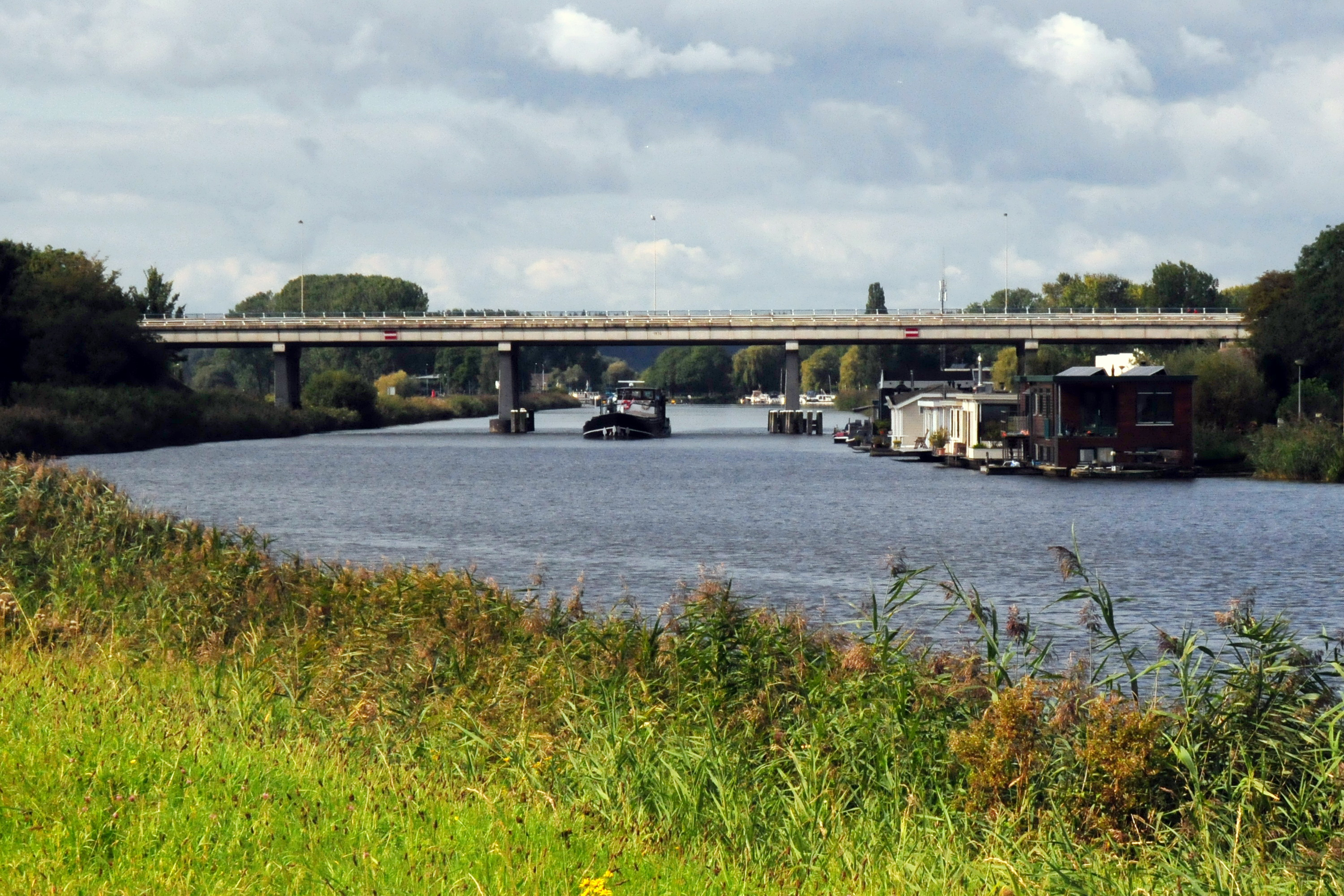
Bridge over the Oude IJssel near Doesburg

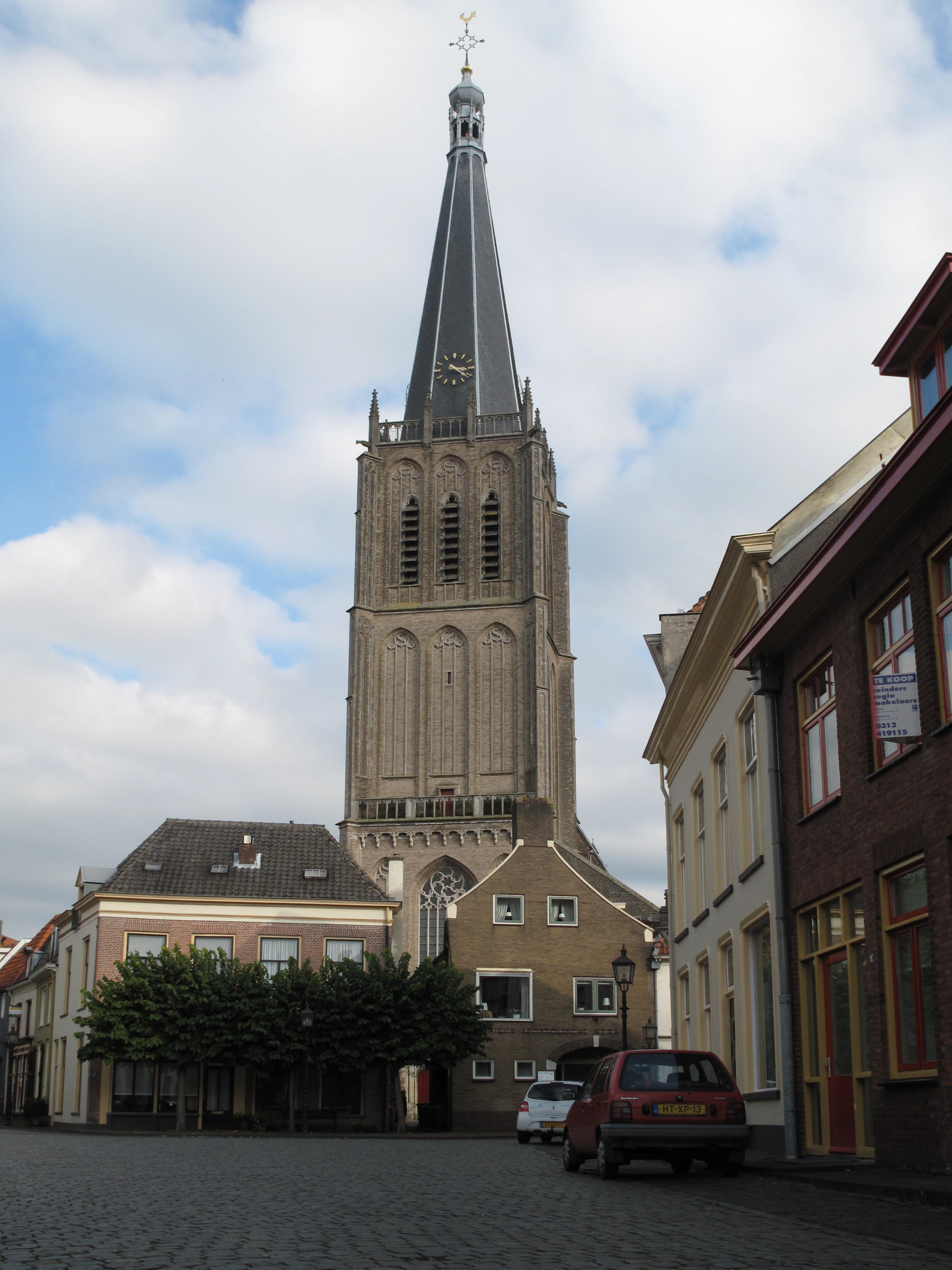
Martinikerk church, Doesburg

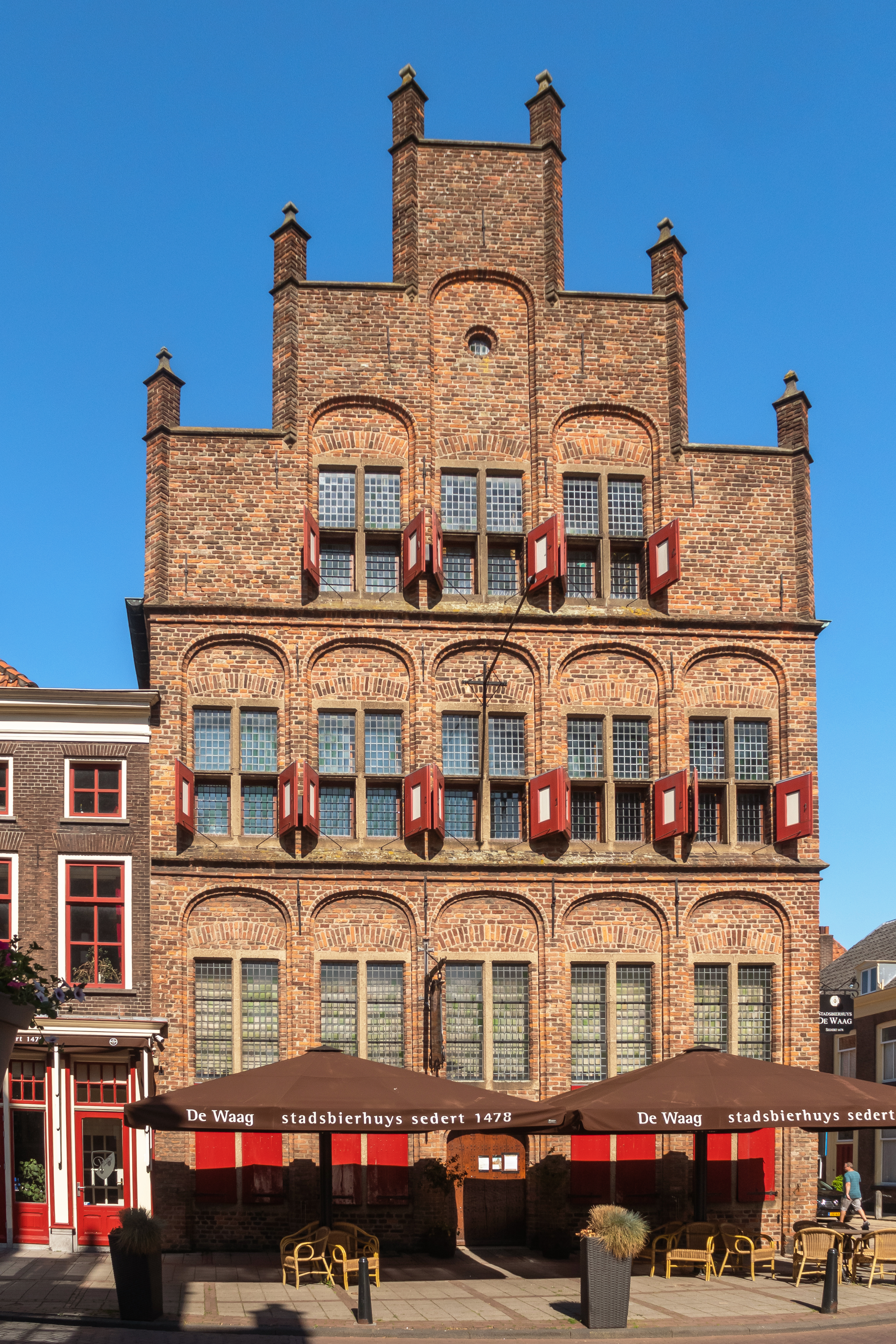
Doesburg, the Waag (weigh house)

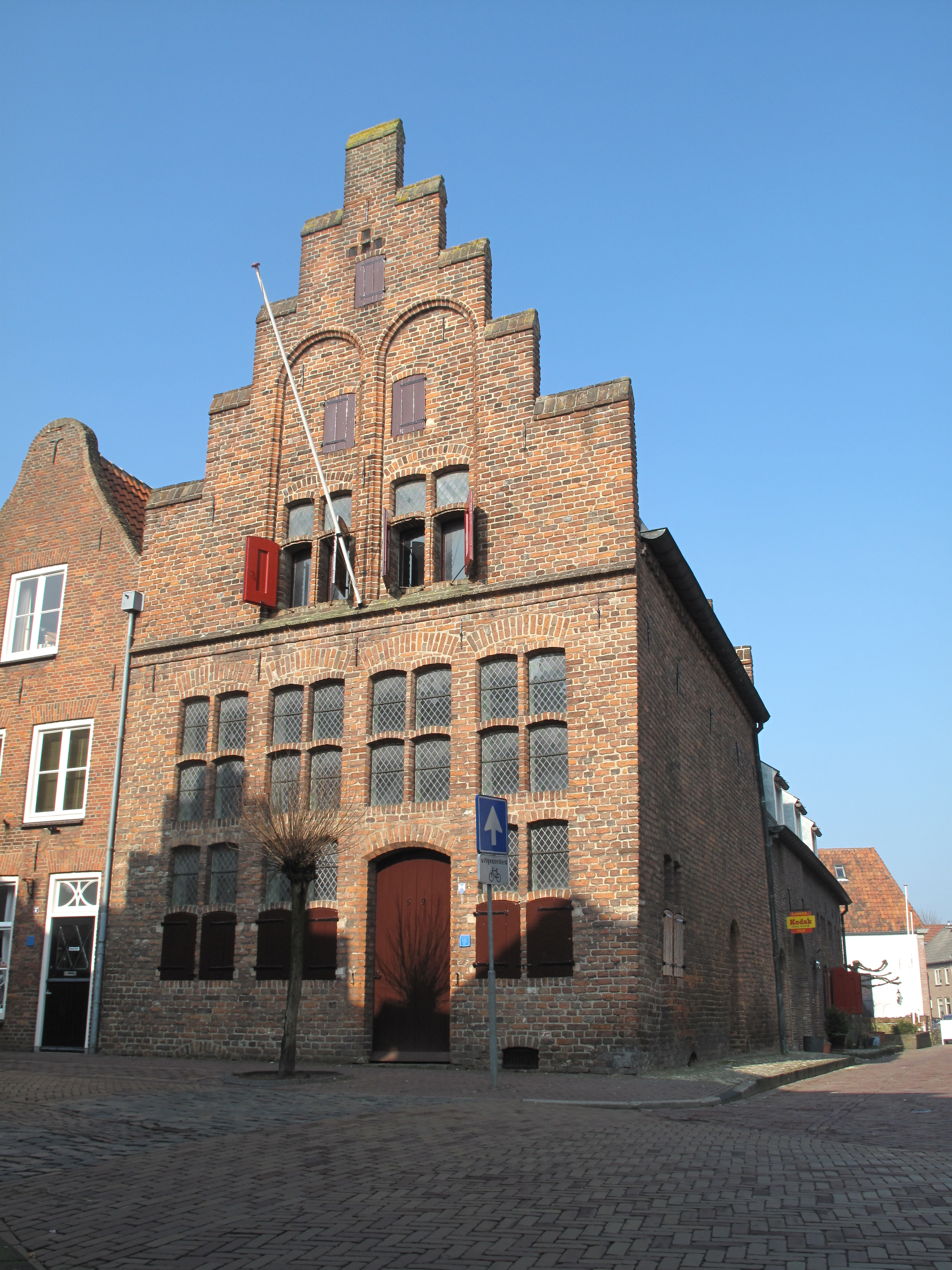
Doesburg, Huys Optenoort

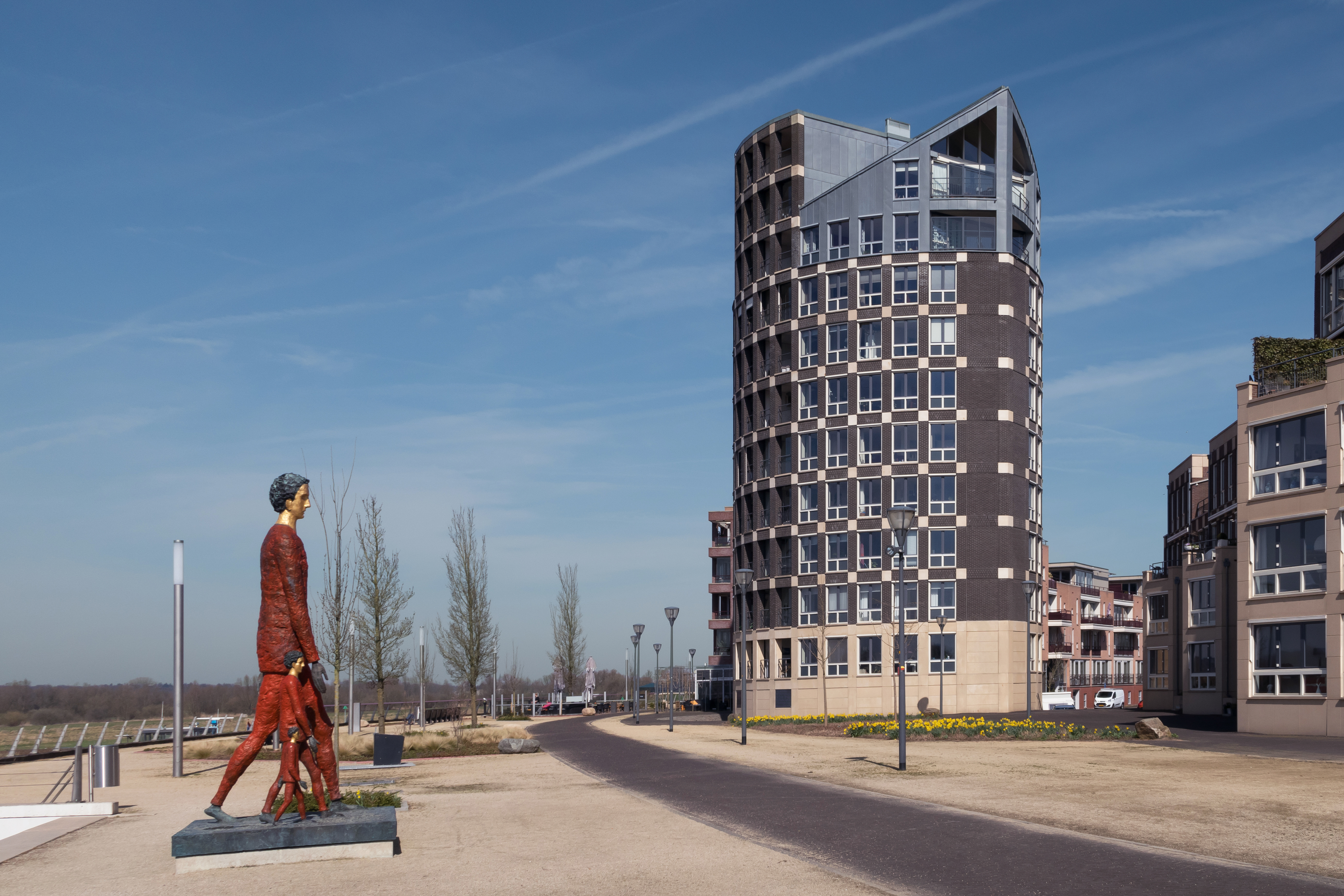
Doesburg, modern architecture
