= Elbert Roest =

Dutch historian, politician and teacher

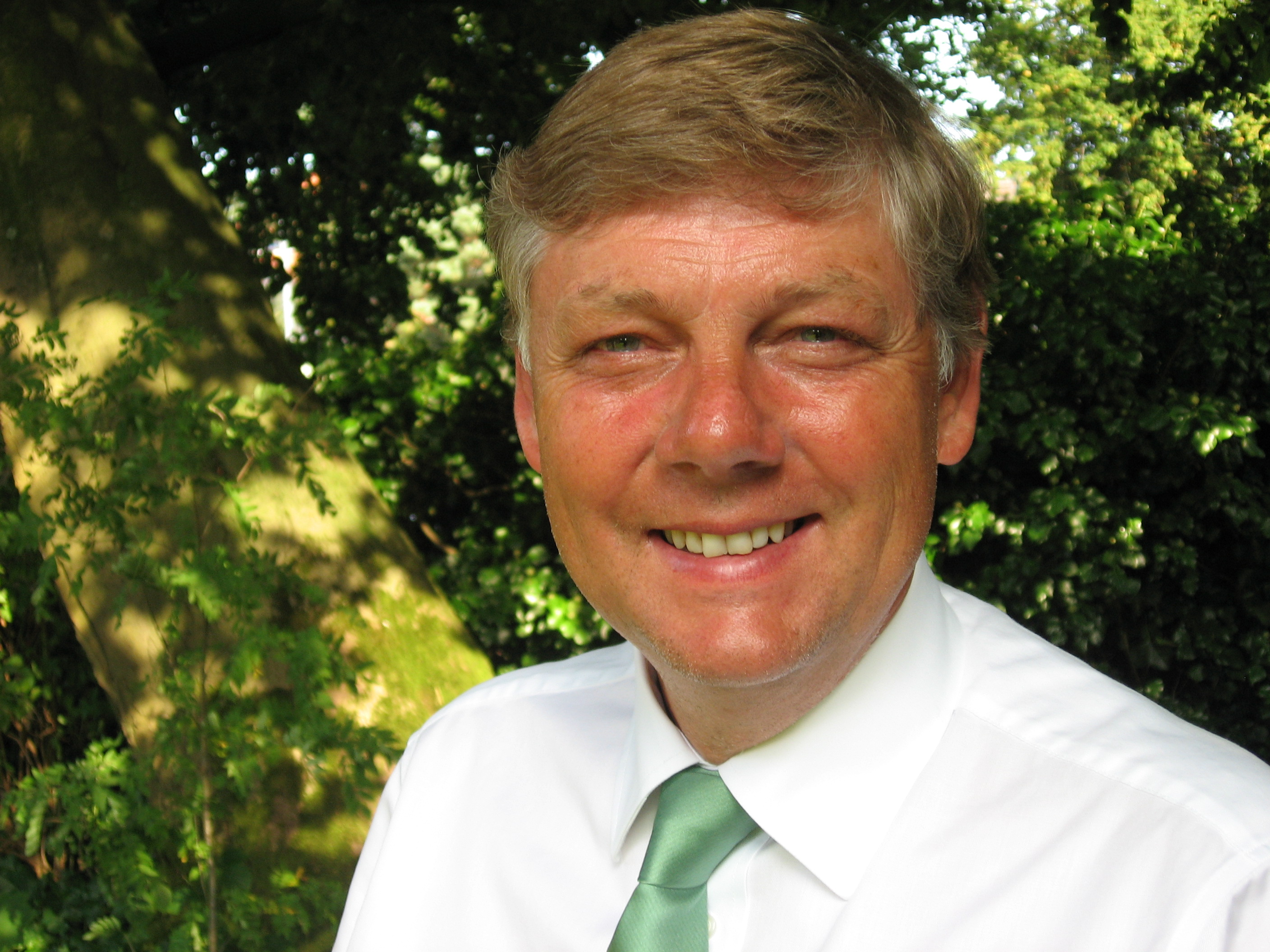

Mayor of Laren, North Holland
- In office 2002–2017
- Preceded by: Theo Hendriks
- Succeeded by: Rinske Kruisinga

Alderman of Doesburg
- In office 1992–2002

Municipal councillor of Doesburg
- In office 1992–2002

Personal details
- Born: 13 October 1954 (age 71) Hoogezand, Netherlands
- Party: Democrats 66

Elbert Jan Roest (born 13 October 1954 in Hoogezand) is a Dutch historian, politician and former teacher. He is a member of Democrats 66 (D66).

From 1992 to 2002, Roest was a member of the municipal council of Doesburg and also an alderman. Roest was the mayor of Laren, North Holland from 2002 until 2017.

Roest studied history at the University of Groningen.
