= William A. Ellis =

Wisconsin politician (1828–1900)

Member of the Wisconsin Senate from the 1st district
- In office January 3, 1881 – January 1, 1883
- Preceded by: George Grimmer
- Succeeded by: Edward S. Minor

Personal details
- Born: April 23, 1828 Topsham, Maine, U.S.
- Died: November 21, 1900 (aged 72) Peshtigo, Wisconsin, U.S.
- Resting place: Riverside Cemetery, Peshtigo, Wisconsin
- Party: Republican
- Spouse: Helen M. Reynolds (m. 1852–1900)
- Children: Edward Davis Ellis^{(b. 1852; died 1884)}; William Allen Ellis Jr.^{(b. 1857)}
- Occupation: Postmaster, lumber business

William Allen Ellis Sr. (April 23, 1828 – November 21, 1900) was an American businessman, Republican politician, and Wisconsin pioneer. He was a member of the Wisconsin State Senate, representing the 1st State Senate district—northeast Wisconsin—during the 1881 and 1882 sessions.

== Biography ==
Ellis was born in Topsham, Maine, and moved to Peshtigo, Wisconsin, in 1857 to work for the Peshtigo Lumber Company. He later worked as a superintendent for the company. He was appointed postmaster at Peshtigo from 1857 through 1872, and also served on the town and county boards. He died in Peshtigo on November 21, 1900.

== Electoral history ==
=== Wisconsin Senate (1880) ===
Wisconsin Senate, 1st District Election, 1880
Party	Candidate	Votes	%	±%
General Election, November 2, 1880
Republican	William A. Ellis	5,869	58.36%	+5.01%
Democratic	John Carel	4,188	41.64%	
Plurality		1,681	16.71%	+10.01%
Total votes		10,057	100.0%	+40.68%
Republican hold				

Wisconsin Senate
Preceded by George Grimmer	Member of the Wisconsin Senate from the 1st district January 3, 1881 – January 1, 1883	Succeeded by Edward S. Minor
