= Kees Luesink =

Dutch politician (1953–2014)

Kees Luesink (January 21, 1953 in Zutphen – December 27, 2014 in Doesburg) was a Dutch politician for GreenLeft (GroenLinks). Since December 1, 2008 he had been mayor of Doesburg. Previously he was an alderman of Zutphen.

In 2014 Luesink was diagnosed with cancer and he died at the end of that year, aged 61.
