= Evanston College for Ladies =

Women's college in Illinois (1871–1873)

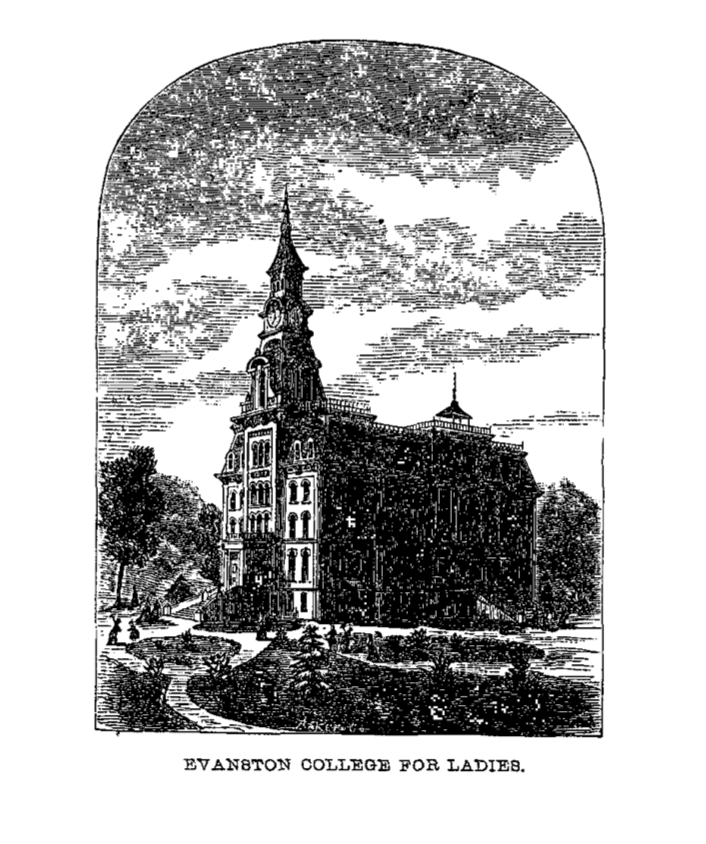
The Evanston College for Ladies 1872-1873 catalogue.

The Evanston College for Ladies was a women's college in Evanston, Illinois between 1871 and 1873. Female students attended classes at Northwestern University, resided at the college, and attended supplemental courses such as fine arts, foreign language, and housekeeping. The mission of the Evanston College for Ladies was to give women access to Northwestern University similar to that which was granted to men. The college was merged with Northwestern University on June 25, 1873.

== Founding ==
The Evanston College for Ladies had its inaugural class in the Fall of 1871, with 236 women enrolled as students. The new school aimed to provide women with the same advantages neighboring Northwestern University did to its male students, while also providing a home where the women's health, morals, and behavior would be attended to by female staff. It replaced the Northwestern Female College as the primary institution for the education of women in Evanston. The transition between the two colleges was smooth, and the charter was transferred to the Evanston College for Ladies at the final commencement for the previous school. Alumnae were accepted by the new college, and plans were made for the building that housed the Northwestern Female College to be rented to the Evanston College for Ladies until their own facilities were constructed.

Frances Willard was chosen as the new president of the college, and fundraising for the new college began, with the most prominent costs being those associated with the construction of the new building. A large celebration was held on July 4, 1871, titled a "Ladies’ Fourth of July," in order to fundraise a portion of these costs. The day included baseball games, comedy, a parade, and laying the cornerstone of the new edifice. Despite the success of this event, and other efforts to secure funding for the new college, the Chicago Fire of 1871 caused significant financial suffering for many of the donors and new sources of funding had to be sought out. This time, the call was answered by Stephen Lunt, who donated $50,000, from the proceeds of the sale of land in Rogers Park, towards the construction of the new building.

== Leadership ==
The newly-established Evanston College for Ladies had a notably all-female administration, given that the mission of the institution was "promoting education for girls that was directed and controlled by women." The leadership team was made up of Frances E. Willard: college president, Elizabeth M. Greenleaf: president of the board, Mary F. Haven: treasurer, and Anna S. Marcy: recording secretary. The college was very proud of its all-women faculty, and the 1871 graduating class was the first of its kind to receive diplomas from women and to hear the baccalaureate address given by a woman.

Before becoming an internationally-known suffragist and reformer, Frances E. Willard was a schoolteacher. Being appointed the first president of the Evanston College for Ladies in 1871 was the start to Willard’s rise out of the inconspicuousness of her former occupations. Due to her leadership of the college, Willard received increasing recognition within the community.

In Willard’s journal, she highlights several teachers who she appointed posts to in the Evanston College for Ladies. Emma B. White was given an honorary diploma from the college and also served as the secretary to the College Board of Trustees. Hannah Maria Pettingill was hired by Willard to be an art teacher in 1871, and was also mentioned in Willard’s journal. Ada Frances Brigham was a student of Willard’s in the Northwestern Female College, and later became a professor at Evanston College for Ladies. Willard wrote in her journal about spending time with Brigham in Evanston. Katharine Jackson, Willard’s longtime friend, became a professor of French and literature at the college in 1871. She lived next door to Willard her whole life.

== Curriculum ==
The main purpose for the Evanston College for Ladies was to provide a supplement to women’s enrollment at Northwestern University. Young women at the college received lodging and supervision from staff who lived in the facility. Students typically enrolled in classical and scientific courses at Northwestern University and received supplemental education from the Evanston College for Ladies. The institution also operated a college preparatory program open to both boys and girls.

The courses offered fine arts, foreign language, kindergarten teaching, and housekeeping classes. Students also had the option of pursuing a Baccalaureate of Arts through the college’s "Historical and Aesthetic Course of Study," which consisted mainly of history and foreign language courses. According to Northwestern University's student newspaper, The Tripod, officers in charge of the curriculum strove to furnish interesting and profitable lectures every week for the students of The Evanston College for Ladies, on topics ranging from dress to health. As part of their curriculum, residents of the college attended lectures on health and hygiene from a female physician, and attended church every Sunday. Every Friday afternoon, young men and women from Evanston and Chicago attended lectures of various topics in the college chapel.

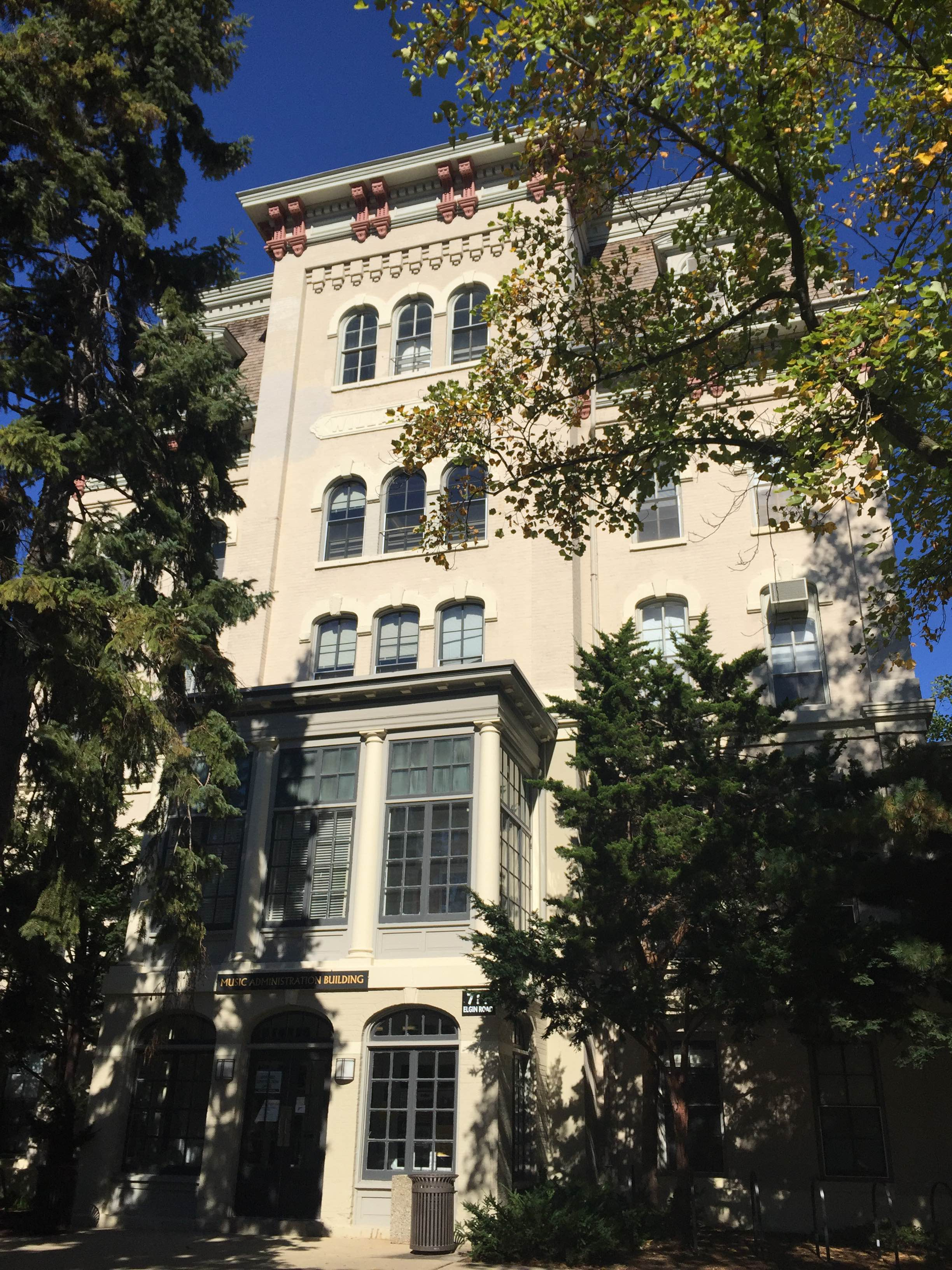
Willard Hall served as a music administration building on Northwestern University's campus from 1940 to 2015.

== Absorption by Northwestern University ==
The Great Chicago Fire of 1871 devastated the Evanston College for Ladies due to the fact that the donors, who had pledged money to pay off the debts acquired by the college’s expansion, could no longer pay. As a result, the Evanston College for Ladies ceded its property and management to Northwestern University in 1873. Northwestern assumed the college’s debts and also promised to include at least five women in the university’s board of trustees.

The Evanston College for Ladies was then known as the Women’s College of Northwestern University. Frances E. Willard, who was the president of The Evanston College for Ladies, became the dean of women as well as professor of aesthetics at Northwestern.

The Women’s College of Northwestern University continued to offer fine arts and college preparatory programs, but the main function was to provide meals, housing, and supervision to Northwestern’s female students. In 1892, the faculty of Northwestern proposed changing the title from "Women’s College" to "Women’s Hall". In 1901, the building finally became known as Willard Hall, and is still named that to this date. In 1940, Willard Hall was transformed into a music administration building for Northwestern University. In 2015, the building was left vacant as the Bienen School of Music was moved to a new campus building.

== Notable people ==
- Marion Murdoch (born 1849), minister
- Minerva Brace Norton (1837-1894), American educator and author
- Mary Bannister Willard (1841-1912), editor, temperance worker, and educator; sister-in-law of Frances Willard
