= George Grimmer =

19th century American politician

Member of the Wisconsin Senate from the 1st district
- In office January 1, 1877 – January 3, 1881
- Preceded by: Enos Eastman
- Succeeded by: William A. Ellis

Personal details
- Born: February 28, 1827 Saint David Parish, New Brunswick, British North America
- Died: March 16, 1907 (aged 80) Kewaunee, Wisconsin, U.S.
- Resting place: Riverview Public Cemetery, Kewaunee, Wisconsin
- Party: Republican
- Spouse: Bertha Lorenz (m. 1860–1907)
- Children: Edward Grimmer^{(b. 1861; died 1861)}; Laura G. (Haney)^{(b. 1864; died 1941)}; Minnie Grimmer^{(b. 1869; died 1870)}; Walter George Grimmer^{(b. 1873; died 1938)}
- Relatives: George S. Grimmer (cousin)

George Grimmer (February 28, 1827 – March 16, 1907) was a Canadian American immigrant, lumberman, Republican politician, and Wisconsin pioneer. He served four years in the Wisconsin Senate, representing Wisconsin's 1st State Senate district—northeastern Wisconsin—from 1877 to 1881.

== Biography ==
Grimmer was born on February 28, 1827, in Saint David Parish, New Brunswick, then part of British North America. He emigrated to the United States, and, in 1850, he moved to Shawano, Wisconsin, to work as a lumberman. Three years later, he moved to Kewaunee, Wisconsin, where he remained for the rest of his life.

In Kewaunee, he served as chairman of the town board for several years, and was chairman of the Kewaunee County Board of Supervisors.

In 1876, he was elected to the Wisconsin State Senate, running on the Republican Party ticket. He represented Wisconsin's 1st State Senate district which then comprised Door, Kewaunee, Marinette, Oconto, and Shawano counties. He was re-elected in 1878, serving through 1880. He did not run for a third term in 1880.

He died on March 16, 1907, at his home in Kewaunee.

== Electoral history ==
=== Wisconsin Senate (1876, 1878) ===
Wisconsin Senate, 1st District Election, 1876
Party	Candidate	Votes	%	±%
General Election, November 7, 1876
Republican	George Grimmer	5,114	61.53%	+17.80%
Democratic	William McCartney	3,198	38.47%	
Plurality		1,916	23.05%	+10.50%
Total votes		8,312	100.0%	+56.45%
Republican gain from Democratic				

Wisconsin Senate, 1st District Election, 1878
Party	Candidate	Votes	%	±%
General Election, November 5, 1878
Republican	George Grimmer (incumbent)	3,814	53.35%	−8.18%
Democratic	H. M. Loomer	3,335	46.65%	
Plurality		470	6.70%	-16.35%
Total votes		7,149	100.0%	-13.99%
Republican hold				

Wisconsin Senate
Preceded by Enos Eastman	Member of the Wisconsin Senate from the 1st district January 1, 1877 – January 3, 1881	Succeeded by William A. Ellis
