= John Bannister (Wisconsin pioneer, born 1810) =

Wisconsin pioneer

7th Mayor of Fond du Lac, Wisconsin
- In office April 1858 – April 1859
- Preceded by: Isaac S. Sherwood
- Succeeded by: John Potter

Judge of Fond du Lac County, Wisconsin
- In office April 1847 – April 1850
- Preceded by: Mason C. Darling
- Succeeded by: Charles M. Tompkins

Register of Deeds of Fond du Lac County, Wisconsin Territory
- In office January 1845 – January 1846
- Preceded by: Oscar Pier
- Succeeded by: S. S. N. Fuller
- In office 1839 – April 1842
- Preceded by: Position established
- Succeeded by: Oscar Pier

Chairman of the Board of Commissioners of Fond du Lac County, Wisconsin Territory
- In office April 1841 – April 1842
- Preceded by: Reuben Simmons
- Succeeded by: George White

Personal details
- Born: July 10, 1810 Conway, Massachusetts, U.S.
- Died: January 20, 1860 (aged 49) Fond du Lac, Wisconsin, U.S.
- Cause of death: Tuberculosis
- Resting place: Rienzi Cemetery, Fond du Lac
- Party: Democratic; Free Soil (1848–1854)
- Children: 3
- Relatives: Theodore Conkey (half-brother); Mary Bannister Willard (niece)
- Occupation: Surveyor

John Bannister (July 10, 1810 – January 20, 1860) was an American surveyor, businessman, and Wisconsin pioneer. He was one of the first settlers at what is now Fond du Lac, Wisconsin, and was the 7th mayor of Fond du Lac. He was also the second postmaster at Fond du Lac and the first register of deeds for Fond du Lac County, and he served at various times as chairman of the county board, probate judge, and justice of the peace.

Bannister was a half-brother of Theodore Conkey, the surveyor and co-founder of Appleton, Wisconsin.

== Biography ==
John Bannister was born in Conway, Massachusetts, in July 1810. When he was five years old, his father died and he moved with his mother to St. Lawrence County, New York, where she remarried.

He came west to the Wisconsin Territory, settling at Green Bay in 1834. In 1836, he traveled south to the area that is now Fond du Lac, Wisconsin, and conducted the first plat for a village at that site. In March of 1838, he returned to that site with his family and settled there permanently. Almost since the time of his arrival, he served as the unofficial surveyor of Fond du Lac County up until the office of surveyor was formally established in 1848. A post office was established in Fond du Lac in 1838. The first postmaster was Colwert Pier, but he resigned after just a few months due to the death of his wife; Bannister was selected as the second postmaster. During these years, he also often served as a justice of the peace, and, in that capacity, he performed the first marriage held in Fond du Lac County, between Alonzo Raymond and Harriet Pier, a niece of Fond du Lac pioneer Edward Pier.

In 1838, Bannister was elected the first register of deeds of Fond du Lac County, serving three years in that role. In 1839, the Wisconsin Territory reorganized county government and established a short-lived system of county commissions, made up of three commissioners elected at large. Bannister was elected one of the three county commissioners for Fond du Lac County and served three years in that role, becoming chairman of the county commission in 1841. During those years, he also conducted the first census of Fond du Lac County for the 1840 United States census; he recorded 139 white residents of the county at that time.

In 1847, Fond du Lac was incorporated as a village. In the first village election, Bannister was elected an assessor and that same year he was elected county judge. In the second village election, Bannister was elected to the board of trustees; he was elected the 3rd village president in 1849 and ultimately served two years from that election, because no election was held in 1850.

During those years, Bannister was active in the Free Soil Party and was a member of the state central committee in 1849. That fall, Bannister was nominated as the party's candidate for lieutenant governor of Wisconsin. In the general election, Bannister came in a distant third place behind Democrat Samuel Beall and Whig Timothy O. Howe.

In 1852, Fond du Lac was re-incorporated as a city. Bannister ran for mayor in the second city election, but lost to George McWilliams. Over the next several years, Bannister was involved in several large business projects in the city, including banks and railroads. After the Free Soil Party disbanded in 1854, Bannister became a member of the Democratic Party. Bannister ran again for mayor in 1858, and this time won the office.

Bannister died of tuberculosis at his home in Fond du Lac on January 20, 1860.

== Personal life and family ==
John Bannister was the eldest of three children born to Amos Bannister and his wife Mary (née Nash). After Amos Bannister's death in 1815, John's mother remarried to Asa Conkey and had four more children. Through his mother's family, John Bannister is a descendant of Thomas Nash, who emigrated from England to the Connecticut Colony sometime before 1640. John was named for his paternal grandfather, John Bannister, who served as the captain of a militia company during the American Revolutionary War.

John's younger brother Henry M. Bannister was a scholar at the Garrett–Evangelical Theological Seminary and one of the leading Methodist theologians of his era. Henry married Lucy Kimball, a daughter of Ruel Kimball; her elder brother Alonzo Kimball was the 14th and 16th mayor of Green Bay, Wisconsin. Henry Bannister's daughter, Mary Bannister Willard, became a leader of the temperance movement.

John's younger half-brother, Theodore Conkey, followed him to the Wisconsin Territory and also became a notable Wisconsin pioneer. Theodore, after residing briefly with Bannister in Fond du Lac, apprenticed as a surveyor under Albert Gallatin Ellis and became one of the first inhabitants at what is now Appleton, Wisconsin. Another half-brother, Asa Hamilton Conkey, also later came to Appleton and served in several education roles.

Bannister married before moving to the Wisconsin Territory. His son, John A. Bannister, was the first American child born in Fond du Lac County, on June 20, 1839. John A. Bannister did not survive to adulthood. John Bannister and his wife had at least two other sons.

== Electoral history ==
Wisconsin Lieutenant Gubernatorial Election, 1849
| Party | Candidate | Votes | % | ±% |
|---|---|---|---|---|
General Election, November 6, 1849
| Democratic | Samuel Beall | 16,446 | 52.33% | −5.37pp |
| Whig | Timothy O. Howe | 10,983 | 34.95% | −7.35pp |
| Free Soil | John Bannister | 3,976 | 12.65% | |
| | Scattering | 21 | 0.07% | |
| Plurality | | 5,463 | 17.38% | +1.98pp |
| Total votes | | 31,426 | 100.0% | -7.40% |
| Democratic hold | | | | |

Party political offices
| Party established | Free Soil nominee for Lieutenant Governor of Wisconsin; 1849 | Succeeded by Benjamin Spaulding |
Political offices
| Office established | Register of Deeds of Fond du Lac County, Wisconsin Territory; 1839 – April 1842 | Succeeded by Oscar Pier |
| Preceded by Oscar Pier | Register of Deeds of Fond du Lac County, Wisconsin Territory; January 1845 – January 1846 | Succeeded by S. S. N. Fuller |
| Preceded by Isaac S. Sherwood | Mayor of Fond du Lac, Wisconsin; April 1858 – April 1859 | Succeeded by John Potter |
