= La Fayette Eastman =

American politician

Member of the Wisconsin State Assembly
- In office 1876–1880

Personal details
- Born: January 22, 1819 Ellisburg, New York, U.S.
- Died: April 27, 1898 (aged 79) Plymouth, Sheboygan County, Wisconsin, U.S.
- Party: Republican
- Relations: Enos Eastman (brother)

La Fayette Eastman (January 22, 1819 – April 27, 1898) was an American politician who served as a member of the Wisconsin State Assembly.

== Early life ==
Eastman was born in Ellisburg, New York.

== Career ==
A pioneer settler of Plymouth, Wisconsin, Eastman owned two farms and a sawmill in Sheboygan County, Wisconsin, and served as a member of the Wisconsin State Assembly from 1876 to 1880. He previously been a candidate for the Assembly in 1872. Eastman also served as chairman and assessor of Plymouth and was a member of the Sheboygan County Board of Supervisors. He was a Republican.

== Personal life ==
On May 9, 1848, Eastman married Lydia T. Marsh. They had four children. His brother, Enos Eastman, was a member of the Wisconsin State Senate. Eastman died on April 27, 1898.
