= Allen F. Warden =

American newspaper editor and politician

- Born: Allen Frank Warden; March 20, 1852; Beloit, Wisconsin, United States
- Died: September 29, 1927 (aged 75); Britton, Oklahoma, United States
- Education: University of Wisconsin
- Occupations: newspaper editor, politician
- Known for: editor, Plymouth Register; member, Wisconsin Assembly

Allen Frank Warden (March 20, 1852 – September 29, 1927) was an American newspaper editor and politician.

Warden was born in Beloit, Wisconsin. He moved with his family to Darlington, Wisconsin. He graduated from University of Wisconsin in 1873. He was the editor of the Plymouth Register newspaper in Plymouth, Wisconsin. He served as the Sheboygan County Superintendent of Public Schools. In 1891, Warden served in the Wisconsin Assembly and was a Democrat. He then moved to Madison, Wisconsin and Waukesha, Wisconsin where he continued to work in the newspaper business. He moved with his wife to Britton, Oklahoma County, Oklahoma. He died, at his home, in Britton, Oklahoma.
