= Lyman E. Barnes =

American lawyer & politician (1855–1904)

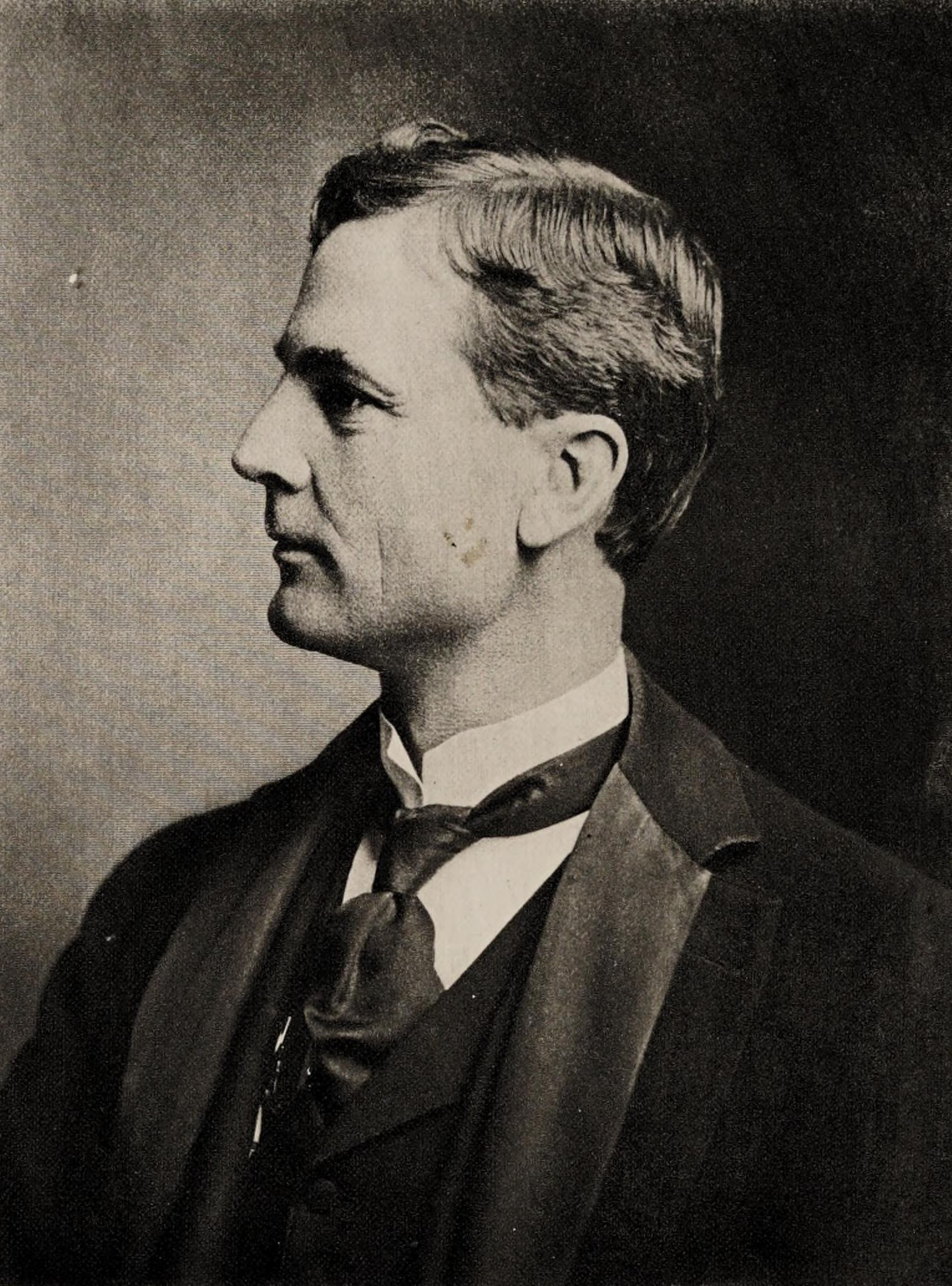

Member of the U.S. House of Representatives from Wisconsin's 8th district
- In office March 4, 1893 – March 3, 1895
- Preceded by: Nils P. Haugen
- Succeeded by: Edward S. Minor

District Attorney of Outagamie County, Wisconsin
- In office January 1, 1891 – January 1, 1893
- Preceded by: John Goodland
- Succeeded by: George H. Dawson

Personal details
- Born: Lyman Eddy Barnes; June 30, 1855 Weyauwega, Wisconsin, U.S.
- Died: January 16, 1904 (aged 48) Appleton, Wisconsin, U.S.
- Cause of death: Appendicitis
- Resting place: Riverside Cemetery, Appleton
- Party: Democratic
- Spouse: Helen Byrd Conkey (m. 1880–1904)
- Children: Theodora Conkey Barnes^{(b. 1882; died 1891)}; Alice Alexandra (Beals)^{(b. 1884; died 1959)}; Thomas Hart Barnes^{(b. 1888; died 1923)}; Edward T. Barnes^{(b. 1889; died 1965)}; Lyman Eddy Barnes, Jr.^{(b. 1893; died 1918)}
- Parents: William W. Barnes (father); Lucy Eddy (Thomas) Barnes (mother)
- Relatives: Theodore Conkey (father-in-law)

Lyman Eddy Barnes Sr. (June 30, 1855 – January 16, 1904) was an American lawyer and Democratic politician from Appleton, Wisconsin. He was a member of the U.S. House of Representatives, representing Wisconsin's 8th congressional district during the 53rd Congress (1893–1895). Earlier in his career, he served as district attorney of Outagamie County, Wisconsin.

== Early life ==
Lyman Barnes was born in Weyauwega, Wisconsin. He attended the public schools in Oshkosh, Wisconsin, until age 17 when he began studying law in the office of Earl P. Lynch and Charles Barber of Oshkosh. He finished his legal education at the law department of Columbia College, in New York City, graduating in 1876.

He immediately returned to Wisconsin, moved to Appleton, Wisconsin, and was admitted to the bar there later that year. He formed a law partnership in 1877 with John Goodland, father of future governor Walter Samuel Goodland. In 1882, he moved to Rockledge, Florida, and practiced law there for about five years before returning to Appleton.

== Political career ==
He was elected district attorney of Outagamie County in 1890.

Wisconsin's 8th congressional district 1892–1901

In 1892, Barnes decided to seek the Democratic Party nomination for U.S. House of Representatives in Wisconsin's 8th congressional district. Wisconsin had just undergone redistricting for the 1890 United States census, and none of Wisconsin's incumbent U.S. representatives resided in the new 8th district. Barnes faced a difficult contest for the nomination against former U.S. representative Thomas R. Hudd. Barnes and Hudd traveled around the district, collecting the support of delegates at various county level conventions. A serious controversy arose from the Portage County convention, where Hudd accused Barnes' supporters of buying delegates. Several prominent Democrats in the district pledged not to support Barnes if the charges were proved. The controversy alone damaged Barnes in the subsequent Brown County convention and left Hudd in a strong position going into the district convention. Nevertheless, Barnes managed to secure the nomination on the first ballot at the convention.

In the general election, Barnes faced Kaukauna businessman and former mayor Henry A. Frambach. Frambach had little formal education and a brief political career, but his campaign sought to emphasize his war record, especially at the Battle of Shiloh. Frambach's Republican allies also sought to exacerbate lingering tensions from the Democratic nominating process, insinuating that Hudd would support Frambach over Barnes. Barnes won the election with 53% of the vote.

Barnes served in the Democratic majority in the 53rd United States Congress (March 4, 1893 – March 3, 1895) and ran for re-election in 1894. He was renominated without opposition and went on to the general election against Edward S. Minor, a former state senator who was then mayor of Sturgeon Bay, Wisconsin. The campaign was bitter and negative, with partisan newspapers slinging accusations and innuendo. The national mood had also turned decisively against the Democrats following the Panic of 1893. Barnes lost his bid for re-election, taking only 42% of the vote in the 1894 general election.

== Later years and death ==
After losing re-election, Barnes resumed his legal career in Appleton. He never ran for elected office again, but in 1903 was appointed to a state court commission to redraw the state's judicial circuits.

On January 10, 1904, Barnes suffered an acute attack of Appendicitis and was taken into the hospital, where surgery was performed. For the first several days after the surgery, his condition appeared to improve, but his condition deteriorated badly on January 15, he spiked a fever and suffered from intense pain and delirium. He died early in the morning on January 16, 1904, at St. Elizabeth's Hospital in Appleton.

He was interred at Riverside Cemetery in Appleton.

== Personal life ==
Lyman Barnes was the son of William W. Barnes and his wife Lucy Eddy (née Thomas).

Barnes married Helen Byrd Conkey, the daughter of Theodore Conkey, in 1880. They had at least five children.

== Electoral history ==
=== U.S. House (1892, 1894) ===
Year	Election	Date	Elected				Defeated				Total	Plurality
1892	General	Nov. 8	Lyman E. Barnes	Democratic	18,187	52.87%	Henry A. Frambach	Rep.	12,358	44.11%	34,400	3,014
1892	General	Nov. 8	Lyman E. Barnes	Democratic	18,187	52.87%	John P. Zonne	Proh.	1,040	3.02%	34,400	3,014
1894	General	Nov. 6	Edward S. Minor	Republican	19,902	54.22%	Lyman E. Barnes	Dem.	15,522	42.29%	36,707	4,380
1894	General	Nov. 6	Edward S. Minor	Republican	19,902	54.22%	John Faville	Proh.	949	2.59%	36,707	4,380
1894	General	Nov. 6	Edward S. Minor	Republican	19,902	54.22%	Andrew J. Larabee	Peo.	330	0.90%	36,707	4,380

U.S. House of Representatives
Preceded by Nils P. Haugen	Member of the U.S. House of Representatives from Wisconsin's 8th congressional district March 4, 1893 - March 3, 1895	Succeeded by Edward S. Minor
Legal offices
Preceded by John Goodland	District Attorney of Outagamie County, Wisconsin; January 1, 1891 – January 1, 1893	Succeeded by George H. Dawson
