= Martinikerk (Doesburg) =

Church in Doesburg, Netherlands

Sint Martinuskerk
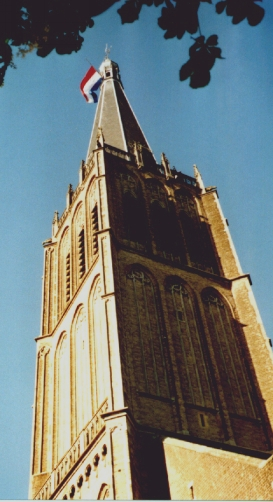
- Tower of the Sint Martinuskerk

Location
- Location: Doesburg, Netherlands
- Interactive map of Sint Martinuskerk
- Coordinates: 52.0145°N 6.13375°E

Architecture
- Type: Church
- Style: Gothic
- Groundbreaking: 15th Century
- Height (max): 94 m (308.40 ft)
- Designated as NHL: Dutch rijksmonument #12981, #12982

The Martinikerk (also Sint Martinuskerk or Hervormde kerk) is a church in Doesburg, Netherlands. The church's tower is the eighth tallest in the Netherlands at 94 metres (308 ft).

== History ==
In 1547, it was struck by lightning, heavily damaging church and tower. The tower was again damaged by French troops in 1672, the rampjaar. It was once more struck by lightning in 1717 and in 1783, it became the first building in the Netherlands to be protected from lightning by a lightning rod.

It was restored 1919–1930 by W. te Riele and N. de Wolf, and restored again after it was heavily damaged when retreating German troops blew up the tower in April 1945.

== Gallery ==
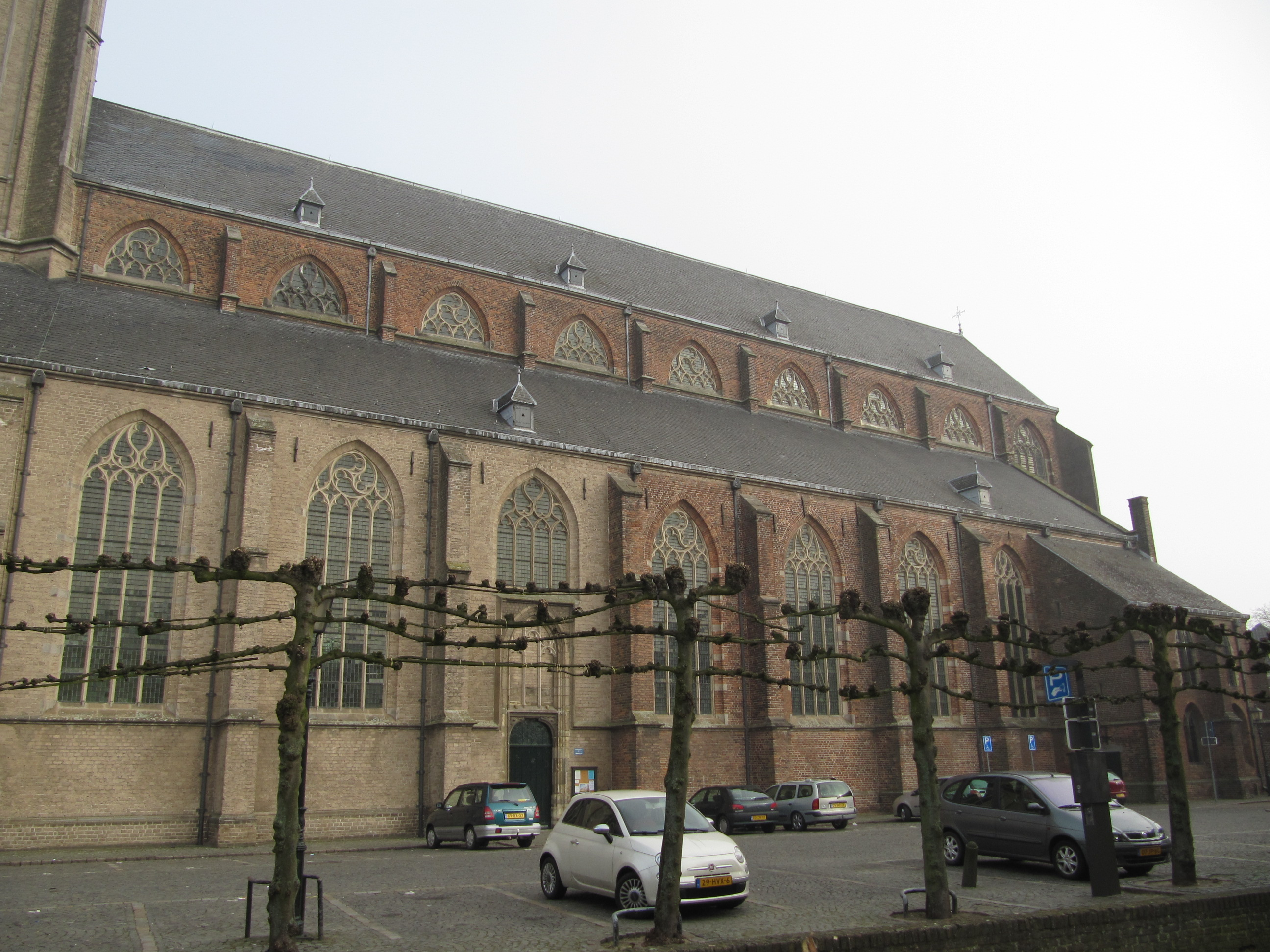
The view from the Kerkstraat

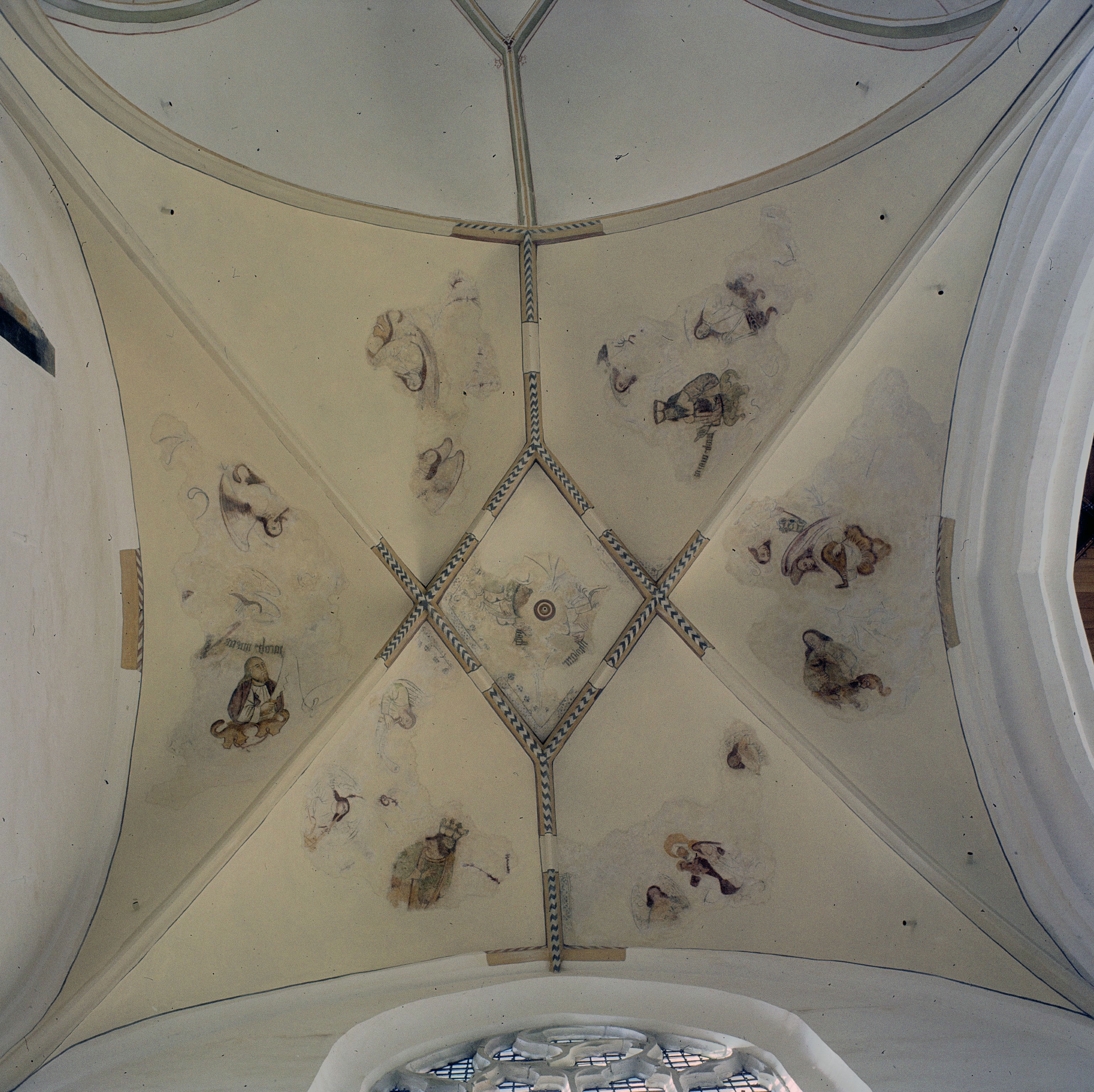
Brick ceiling

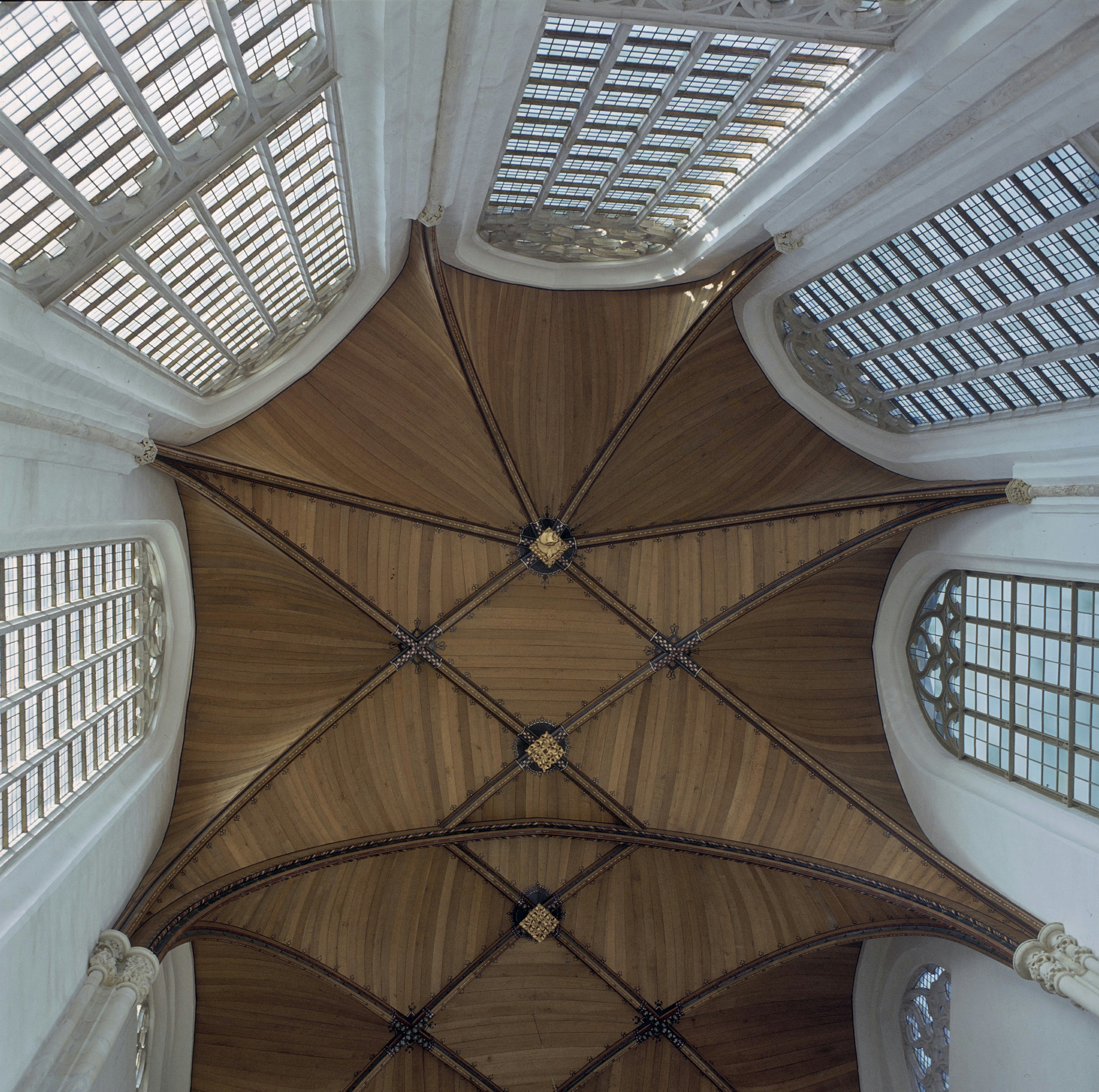
Wooden ceiling

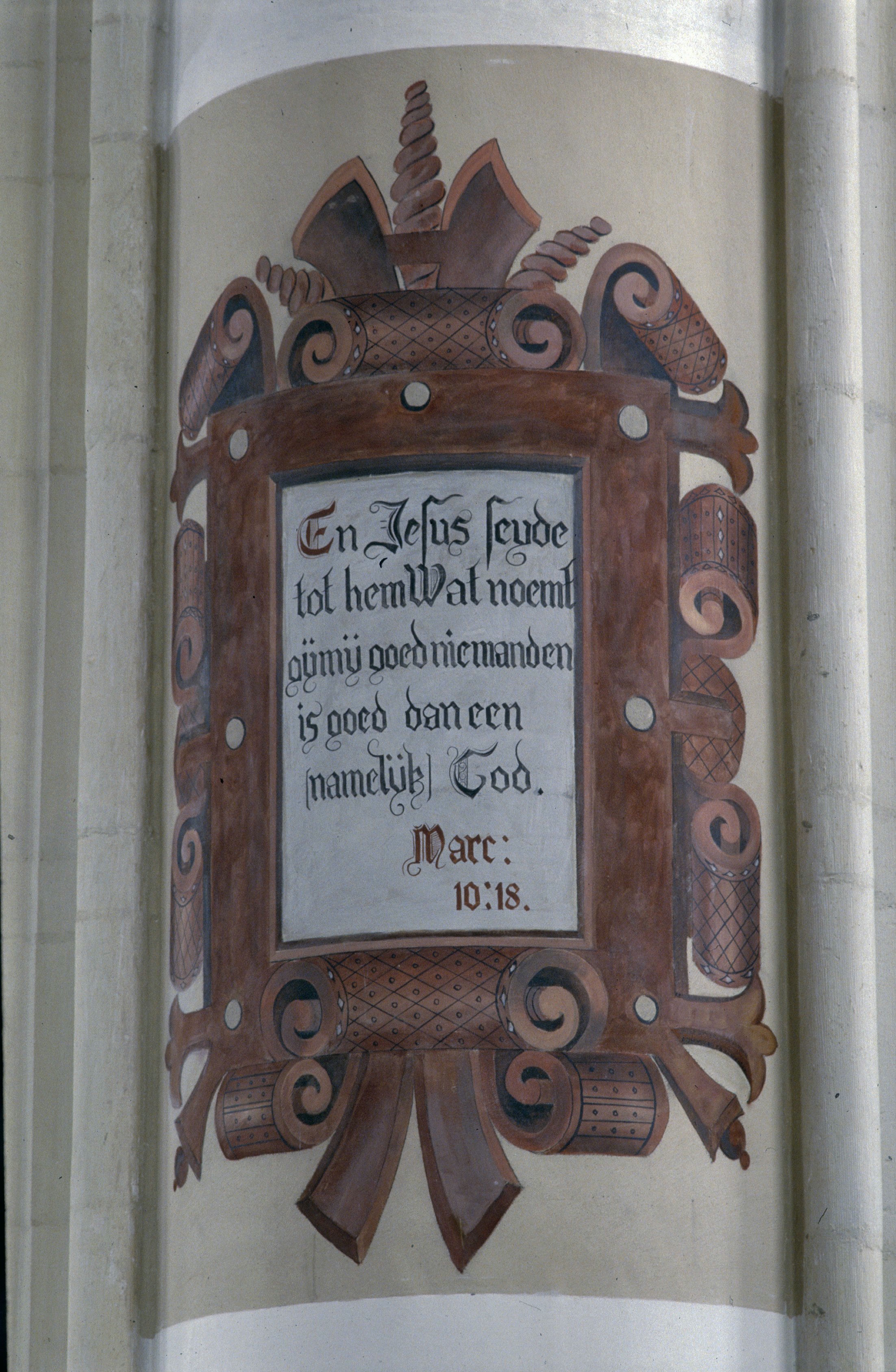
Interieur, Painting

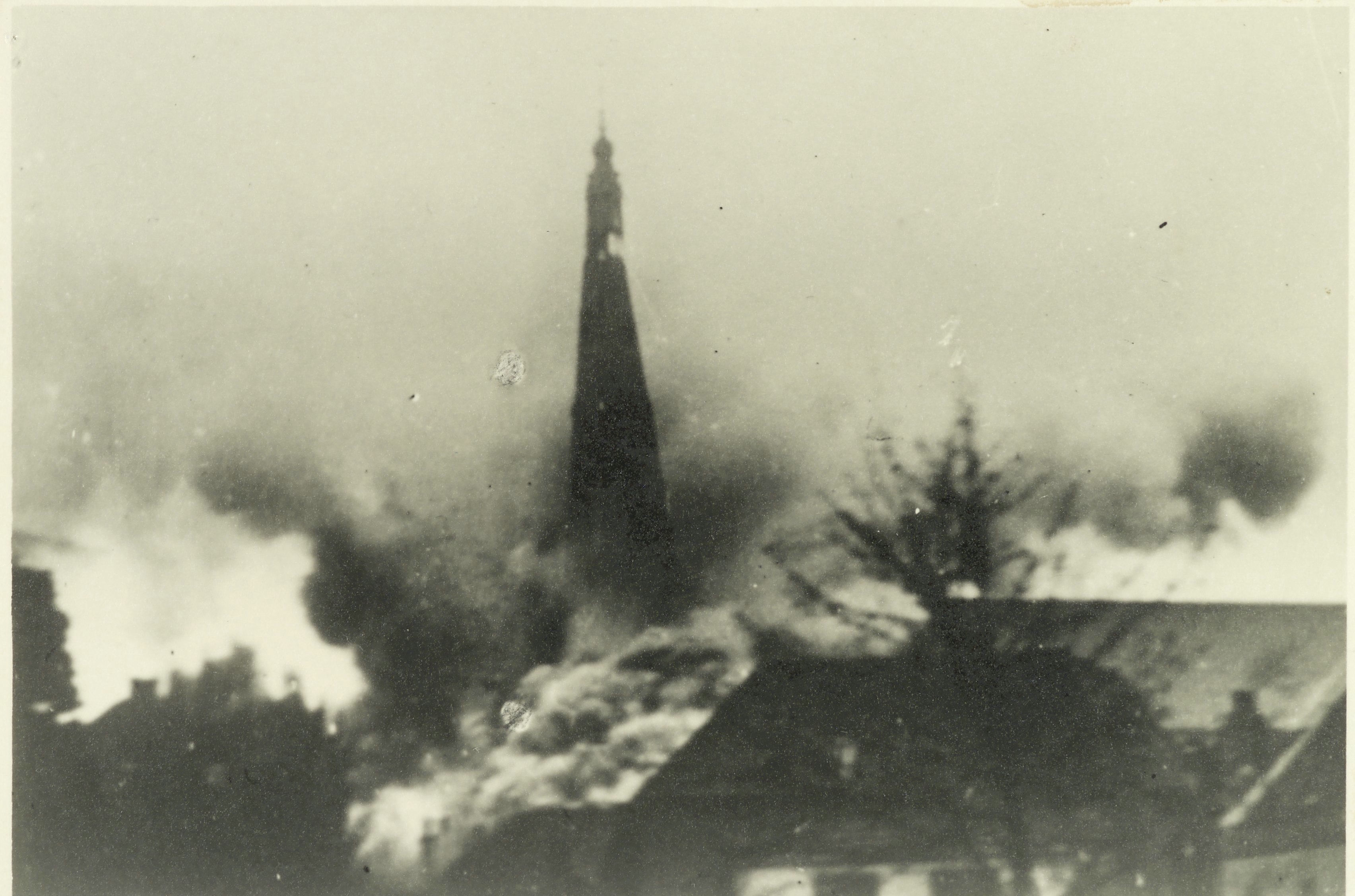
Destruction 15 April 1945

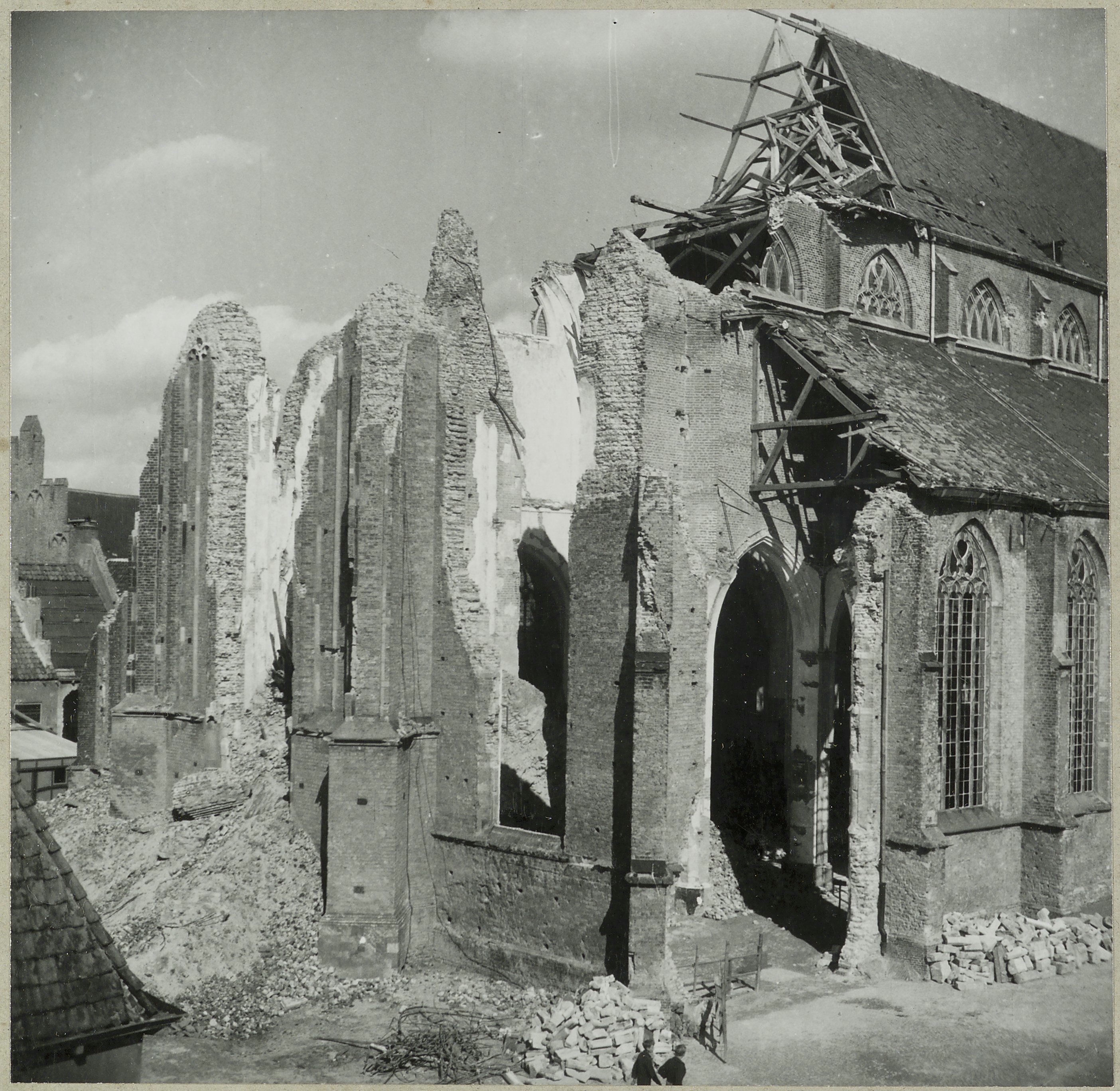
Ruin 1945

== See also ==
- List of tallest structures built before the 20th century
