= Britton, Oklahoma =

- Location within the state of Oklahoma
- Coordinates: 35°33′56″N 97°31′52″W
- Country: United States
- State: Oklahoma
- County: Oklahoma
- Elevation: 1,221 ft (372 m)
- Time zone: UTC-6 (Central (CST))
  - Summer (DST): UTC-5 (CDT)
- GNIS feature ID: 1090504

Britton is a former town in Oklahoma County, Oklahoma, United States, annexed by Oklahoma City in 1950. The GNIS classifies it as a populated place.

Britton, founded in 1889, bears the name of Washington D.C. railroad attorney, Alexander Britton, who worked for the Atchison, Topeka and Santa Fe Railway. As part of its charter allowing a railroad to be built through Oklahoma, the United States required the construction of railway stations every seven miles. The first site north of Oklahoma City became the town of Britton. Britton's altitude is 1,220 feet above sea level and is the highest point on the Santa Fe Railroad between Kansas City, Missouri and Galveston, Texas.

Through the efforts of Oklahoma City developers Anton H. Classen and John Wilford Shartel, Britton was connected in 1910 to Oklahoma City through the Oklahoma Railway Company's Interurban, which ran on north to Guthrie. During its early years, the town thrived and was home to two movie theaters, gas stations, a drug store, a lumberyard, medical clinics and retail businesses. Before its annexation by Oklahoma City in 1950, Britton's main street offered a shopping point for its 6,000 residents.

Between March 3, 1936 and March 2, 1953, Route 66 passed directly through downtown Britton and was the major conduit through which Route 66 travelers made their way through Oklahoma City en route to Illinois and California. The Owl Courts motel, one of Oklahoma City's oldest surviving 1930s era Route 66 motels, was built in the former town of Britton.
