= Plymouth, Sheboygan County, Wisconsin =

Plymouth, Wisconsin
- Town
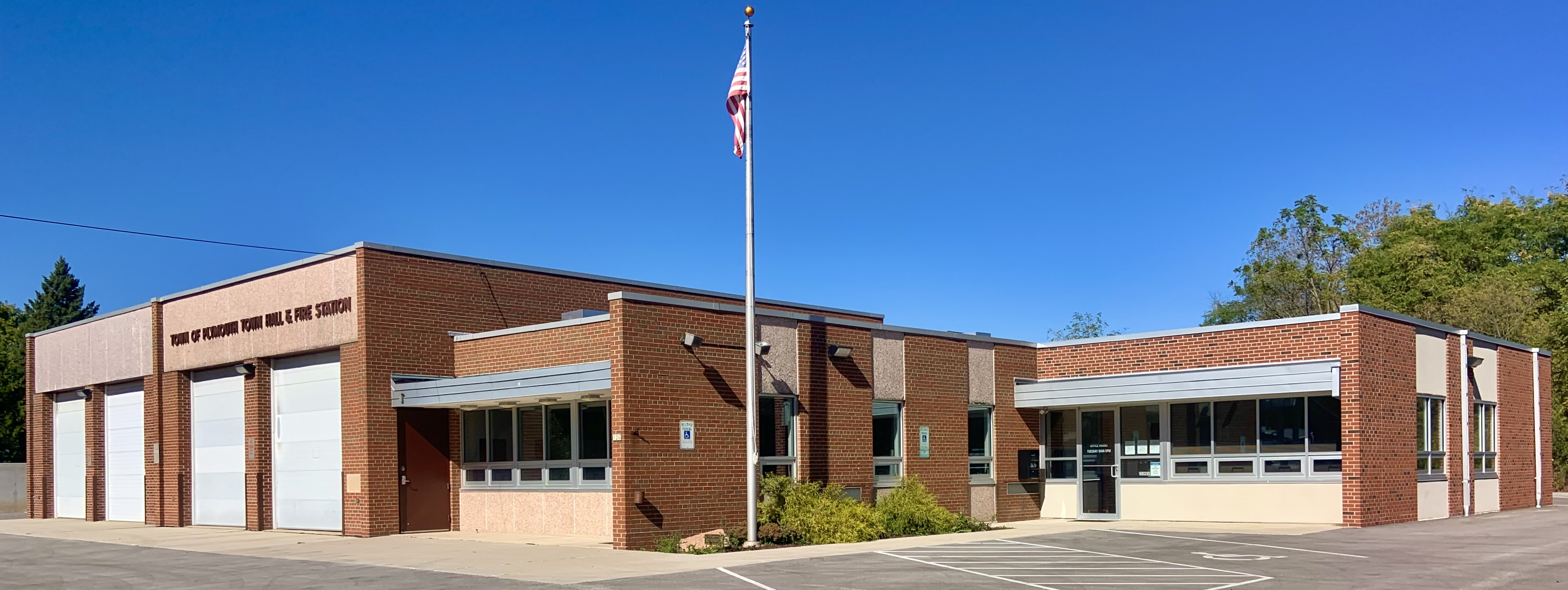
- Town hall

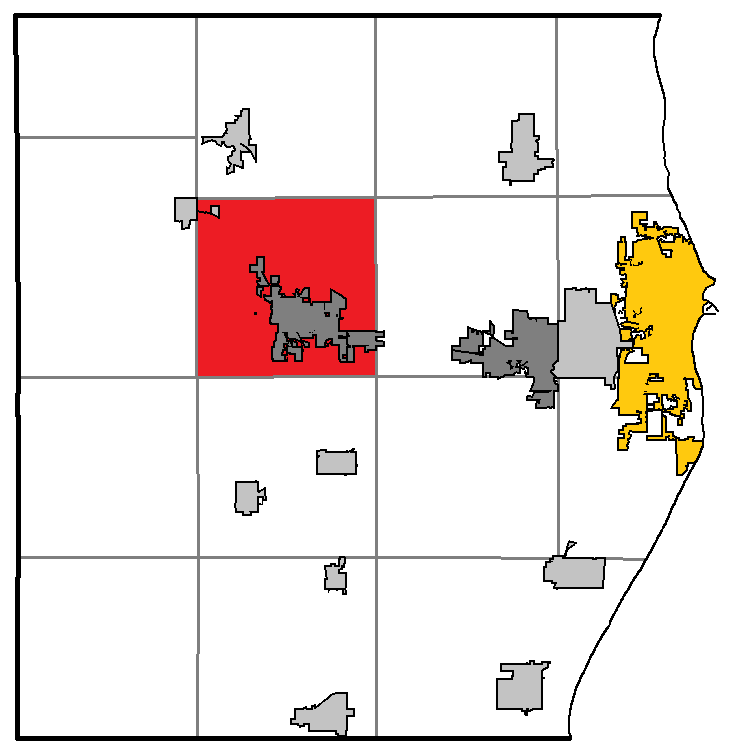
- Location of Plymouth, within Sheboygan County
- Coordinates: 43°45′51″N 87°58′47″W
- Country: United States
- State: Wisconsin
- County: Sheboygan

Area
  - Total: 31.5 sq mi (81.6 km^{2})
  - Land: 31.5 sq mi (81.5 km^{2})
  - Water: 0.039 sq mi (0.1 km^{2})
- Elevation: 830 ft (253 m)

Population (2020)
  - Total: 3,083
  - Density: 98.0/sq mi (37.8/km^{2})
- Time zone: UTC-6 (Central (CST))
  - Summer (DST): UTC-5 (CDT)
- Area code: 920
- FIPS code: 55-63725
- GNIS feature ID: 1583948
- Website: https://www.townofplymouth.wi.gov/

Plymouth is a town in Sheboygan County, Wisconsin, United States. The population was 3,083 at the time of the 2020 census. It is included in the Sheboygan, Wisconsin Metropolitan Statistical Area. The City of Plymouth is located within the town, but is politically independent. The unincorporated community of New Paris is also located in the town.

== Geography ==
According to the United States Census Bureau, the town has a total area of 31.5 square miles (81.6 km^{2}), of which 31.5 square miles (81.5 km^{2}) of it is land and 0.04 square miles (0.1 km^{2}) of it (0.10%) is water.

== Demographics ==
As of the census of 2000, there were 3,115 people, 1,092 households, and 885 families residing in the town. The population density was 99.0 people per square mile (38.2/km^{2}). There were 1,178 housing units at an average density of 37.4 per square mile (14.5/km^{2}). The racial makeup of the town was 98.07% White, 0.42% Black or African American, 0.19% Native American, 0.26% Asian, 0.03% Pacific Islander, 0.19% from other races, and 0.83% from two or more races. 0.87% of the population were Hispanic or Latino of any race.

There were 1,092 households, out of which 35.9% had children under the age of 18 living with them, 75.3% were married couples living together, 3.2% had a female householder with no husband present, and 18.9% were non-families. 16.1% of all households were made up of individuals, and 7.2% had someone living alone who was 65 years of age or older. The average household size was 2.73 and the average family size was 3.06.

In the town, the population was spread out, with 25.3% under the age of 18, 6.4% from 18 to 24, 25.5% from 25 to 44, 29.7% from 45 to 64, and 13.1% who were 65 years of age or older. The median age was 42 years. For every 100 females, there were 100.6 males. For every 100 females age 18 and over, there were 96.1 males.

The median income for a household in the town was $61,038, and the median income for a family was $63,750. Males had a median income of $40,913 versus $27,316 for females. The per capita income for the town was $25,275. About 1.0% of families and 2.1% of the population were below the poverty line, including none of those under age 18 and 6.0% of those age 65 or over.

== Notable people ==
- La Fayette Eastman, Wisconsin state representative
- Henry Krumrey, Wisconsin state representative
- Charles A. Laack, Wisconsin state representative
- Henry Ott, Wisconsin state representative

== See also ==
- List of towns in Wisconsin
