= Jarvis T. Wright =

American businessman and hotel keeper

Jarvis Thomas Wright (March 27, 1830 – March 22, 1886) was an American businessman and hotel keeper.

Wright was born in Villenova, Chautauqua County, New York. In 1855, Wright moved to North Bay, Wisconsin and then in 1872 settled in Sturgeon Bay, Wisconsin. He owned a hotel in Sturgeon Bay. He served in the Wisconsin Assembly in 1877 as a Democrat. Wright died in Sturgeon Bay, Wisconsin.
