= Theodore Conkey =

19th century American pioneer and politician

Member of the Wisconsin Senate from the 1st district
- In office January 6, 1851 – January 3, 1853
- Preceded by: Lemuel Goodell
- Succeeded by: Horatio N. Smith

Member of the Wisconsin State Assembly from the Outagamie County district
- In office January 5, 1857 – January 4, 1858
- Preceded by: Position established
- Succeeded by: Perry H. Smith

Personal details
- Born: December 11, 1819 Canton, New York, U.S.
- Died: March 17, 1880 (aged 60) Appleton, Wisconsin, U.S.
- Resting place: Riverside Cemetery, Appleton
- Party: Democratic
- Spouse: Cynthia F. Foote (m. 1848–1880)
- Children: Alice F. (Reid)^{(b. 1852; died 1892)}; Edward Conkey^{(b. 1854; died 1882)}; Helen Byrd (Barnes)^{(b. 1858; died 1935)}; 1 other (died young)
- Relatives: John Bannister (half-brother); Lyman E. Barnes (son-in-law)
- Profession: surveyor, businessman

Military service
- Allegiance: United States
- Branch/service: United States Volunteers; Union Army
- Years of service: 1862–1865
- Rank: Captain, USV
- Unit: 3rd Reg. Wis. Vol. Cavalry
- Battles/wars: American Civil War

Theodore Conkey (December 11, 1819 – March 17, 1880) was an American surveyor, businessman, Democratic politician, and Wisconsin pioneer. Working as a surveyor with Albert Gallatin Ellis, he was responsible for many of the early surveys of northern Wisconsin and was one of the earliest settlers of what is now Appleton, Wisconsin. He was an early member of the Wisconsin Senate and Wisconsin State Assembly, representing the 1st Senate district in the 1851 and 1852 terms, and representing Outagamie County in the 1857 Assembly. He also served as a Union Army cavalry officer during the American Civil War.

== Biography ==
Theodore Conkey was born in Canton, New York. He left his father's farm in 1841, moving first to Fond du Lac, in the Wisconsin Territory, then settling for a year in Madison, where he taught school. He returned to Fond du Lac and took up a new career in civil engineering, where he conducted U.S. government surveys of land in Wisconsin. As a surveyor, he apprenticed under Albert Gallatin Ellis, who had been surveyor general of the Wisconsin and Iowa district. Together, they surveyed large tracts of northern Wisconsin.

Conkey determined that the Grand Chute rapids would provide an ideal source for water-power, and in early 1849, in partnership with Morgan Lewis Martin and Abraham B. Bowen, they selected a tract of land on the north side of the Fox River to start a village. Conkey surveyed and platted the land where the city would be built, and in July 1849, moved his family to the area, becoming one of the original pioneers of Appleton, Wisconsin. Conkey constructed a saw mill, and performed contract construction projects in the area. He was invested in improvements on the Fox and Wisconsin Rivers, partnering again with Morgan Lewis Martin.

In 1861, at news of the outbreak of the American Civil War, Conkey sold his mill and decided to help raise a company of men for the Union Army. His volunteers were incorporated into the 3rd Wisconsin Volunteer Cavalry Regiment as Company I, and Conkey was named Captain of that company. The regiment was attached to the Army of the Frontier and served almost the entire war in Missouri, Kansas, and Arkansas. He mustered out of the service as lieutenant colonel of the regiment a few months after the close of the war.

He returned to Wisconsin November 1865 and resumed the milling business, investing with Charles Pfennig. On his partner's death, Conkey bought out the other investors. He invested in enlarging and improving the mill, and was involved in running it until 1879, when he sold to Kimblerly, Clark & Co. Conkey effectively retired from business after this sale.

== Political career ==
Conkey was a member of the Wisconsin Senate from 1851 to 1852. Perhaps his most important legislative contribution in the Senate was his act in 1851 to split off the western part of Brown county and create a new county named "Outagamie." Conkey later represented Outagamie county in the Wisconsin Assembly in 1857. He also served on the Appleton City Council and on the Outagamie County Board. He was a Democrat.

== Personal life and family ==
Theodore Conkey was one of four children born to Asa Conkey and Mary (née Nash). Asa Conkey was a farmer, and had served in the U.S. Army during the War of 1812. Both of Theodore's parents had previously been in earlier marriages and had children from their prior marriages. One of Theodore's elder half-brothers from his mother's previous marriage was John Bannister, a pioneer of Fond du Lac, Wisconsin.

An Episcopalian, Theodore Conkey married Cynthia F. Foote in June 1848. They had at least four children, though one died in childhood. Their daughter Helen married Lyman E. Barnes, who would later serve in Congress.

Wisconsin State Assembly
District established by 1856 Wisc. Act 109	Member of the Wisconsin State Assembly from the Outagamie County district January 5, 1857 – January 4, 1858	Succeeded by Perry H. Smith
Wisconsin Senate
Preceded by Lemuel Goodell	Member of the Wisconsin Senate from the 1st district January 6, 1851 – January 3, 1853	Succeeded by Horatio N. Smith
