= Frederik Alexander Adolf Gregory =

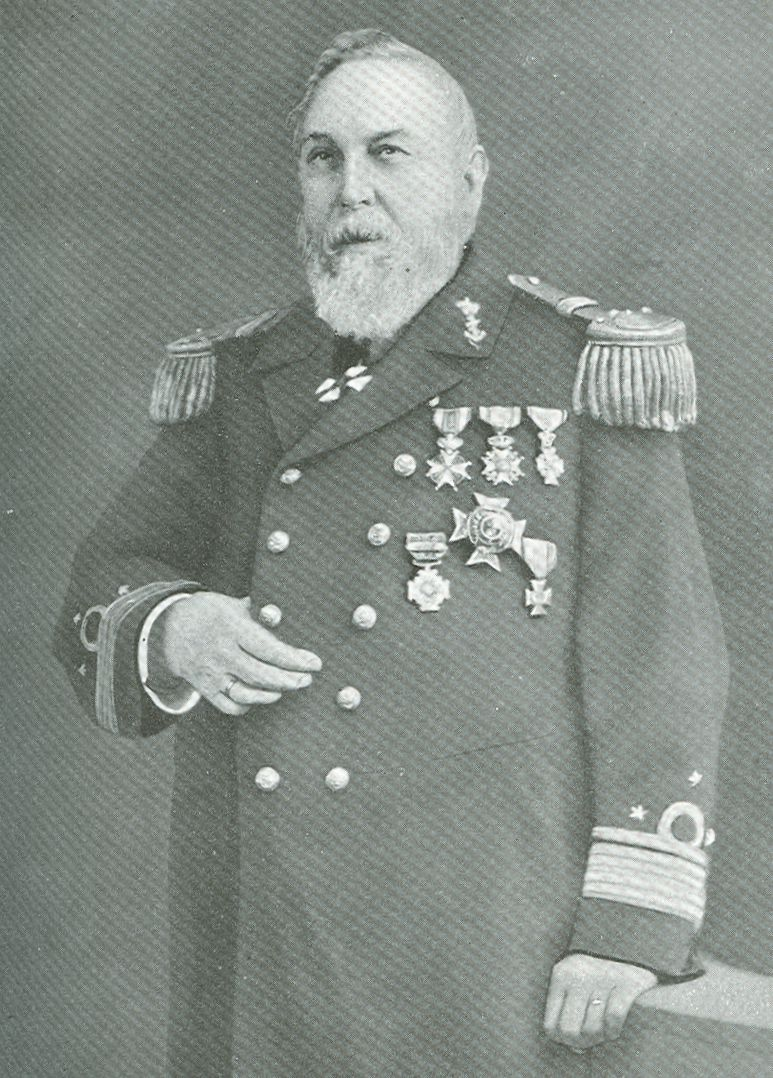
Photo of c. 1889

Frederik Alexander Adolf Gregory (13 May 1814 in Doesburg – 16 July 1891 in The Hague) was a Dutch vice admiral. He was married to Catherine de Sauvage Nolting.

Preceded by Generaal H.F.C. Duycker	Chancellor of the Dutch Orders; 1879-1891	Succeeded by Luitenant-generaal H.G.Boumeester
