= Charles August Masse =

Dutch-born American politician in Wisconsin

Charles August Joseph Masse (baptised Carolus Augustinus Josephus Massé; December 3, 1838 – December 2, 1913) was a Dutch-American politician and member of the Wisconsin State Assembly.

== Biography ==
Masse was born in 1838, in Doesburg, Netherlands. His family immigrated to the United States in 1848. After residing in Cook County, Illinois, and Brown County, Wisconsin, he moved to Door County, Wisconsin, in 1867.

Masse was a member of the Assembly in 1879. Other positions he held include County Clerk of Door County in 1871, 1872, 1873, 1874, 1875 and 1876 and County Treasurer of Door County in 1877 and 1878. He was a Republican.

He died in 1913, the day before his 75th birthday.
