= Bert Matter =

Dutch composer and organist (1937–2026)

- Matter, in the 1990s
- Born: 29 April 1937; Baambrugge, Netherlands
- Died: 26 August 2026 (aged 89); Zutphen, Netherlands
- Education: Rotterdams Conservatorium
- Occupations: Organist; Composer; Academic teacher
- Organizations: Walburgiskerk; Royal Conservatory of The Hague
- Awards: Order of Orange-Nassau; Sweelinck Prize
- Website: bertmatter.nl

Bert Matter (29 April 1937 – 26 August 2026) was a Dutch organist and composer who worked at the Walburgiskerk in Zutphen for 33 years. He was instrumental in the restoration of its Bader/Timpe organ and made many recordings. He gave concerts internationally, with a focus on improvisation. He taught at the Royal Conservatory of The Hague and was also chief editor of Het Orgel published by the Dutch Organist Society. His compositions are mostly based on psalms and hymns, often in minimal music style.

== Life and career ==
Egbert Jan Matter was born on 29 April 1937 in Baambrugge, to Hendrik Margienus Matter and Grietje Frederika Wiersma; his father was a pastor of the Reformed Church. He began taking organ lessons in 1953 with Pieter Vandekorkoff. The lessons were first held at the teacher's home, but with improved capabilities, were moved to the large Walcker organ of the Reformed Church in Rotterdam which was suitable to works of the French Romantic music, but not the music of Sweelinck and Bach. Vandekorkoff taught a technique initiated by Marcel Dupré, with a focus on legato playing.

Matter studied piano and organ at the Rotterdams Conservatorium, organ with Piet van den Kerkhoff and improvisation with Cor Kee. During his studies he played the organ in Charlois, Hoogeveen, Almen and De Wijngaard in Zutphen.

From 1960, he taught organ at the musical school in Deventer. He became a lecturer of music theory at the Utrechts Conservatorium in 1967, and the principal organ teacher at the Arnhem Conservatory in 1969. He became organist at the Walburgiskerk in Zutphen in 1969. He was instrumental in the restoration of its Bader/Timpe organ, completed in 1996. The instrument was then regarded as one of the finest in the country. He made many recordings of organ music before and after the restoration, including works by Bach and Franck. He gave concerts internationally, with a focus on improvisation.

Matter became principal lecturer at the Royal Conservatory of The Hague in 1987, influencing notable students. His students included Els Dijkerman, Toon Hagen, Joost Langeveld, Johan Luimes, Henk Luijmes, Klaas Stok, Paul Tegels, and Pieter Van Dijk. He retired from his organist position in 2002 and was succeeded by Klaas Stok.

Matter was active in organisation of the Royal Dutch Organists' Association and in the International Organ Days Rijnstreek. He served as the chief editor of the Het Orgel magazine from 1967 to 1970. He was a guest lecturer and a jury member at competitions. In 2009, he co-authored In goede harmonie, a workbook for composing and performing choral settings of the Genevan Psalter, together with Peter Molenaar.

Matter became a knight of the Order of Orange-Nassau in 1997. In 2012, Matter was awarded the Sweelinck Prize, the Dutch prize awarded to persons with an outstanding contribution to organ music. Matter received the prize for his role in the education of young organists, his talent for improvisation, and his internationally known compositions.

Matter died on 26 August 2026 in Zutphen, aged 89.

== Compositions ==
Matter composed around 40 compositions, mostly based on psalms and hymns. His music is influenced by minimal music, such as that of Steve Reich. In 2002, a recording of some of his works was made by his students, Els Dijkerman, Johan Luijmes, Toon Hagen and Klaas Stok, named Bert Matter Organ Works. They chose, besides shorter works for worship, three Fantasies and two Partitas. A reviewer noted that he, along with Jan Welmers gave organ improvisation a new dimension, by not turning "to avant-garde trends or formalist theories", but to minimalist composition.

=== Organ ===
- Een muzikale meditatie over Psalm 139 on Psalm 139
- Fantaisie sur Psaume 65 "De stilte zingt u toe, o Heer" on Psalm 65
- Fantaisie sur Psaume 90 "Gij zijt geweest, o Heer" on Psalm 90
- Fantaisie sur "Une jeune fillette" / Fantasie sopra "Von Gott will ich nicht lassen" (Gezang 126) (1988)
- Arrangements of hymns, Gezang 47, 57, 181, 205, 286
- Two movements (1 and 4) of a collaborative setting (with Cor Kee) of the Magnificat, with choir
- Partita sopra "Ich ruf zu dir, Herr Jesu Christ" / "U Here Jezus roep ik aan" (Gezang 404)
- Partita sopra "Wie schön leuchtet der Morgenstern" (Gezang 157) / "Wees wellekom, Immanuël" (Gezang 148)
- Arrangements for Psalm 1, 23, 30, 32, 51, 53, 64, 78, 90, 98, 102, 103, 116, 125
- Vater Unser on the Lord's Prayer (2012)

=== Vocal music ===
- "Geef vrede, Heer, geef vrede" (Gezang 285) for voice and organ (2022)
- Missa St. Walburga for choir and organ (2014)

=== Film score ===
- Music for the documentary De staart van de leeuw by Gys Zevenbergen (2001)

=== Hymn ===
- Psalm 1 "Gelukkig is de mens" for the ecumenical hymnal Liedboek – zingen en bidden in huis en kerk (2013)
