= Walburgiskerk, Zutphen =

Church in Zutphen, the Netherlands

Walburgiskerk
- Interior towards the organ in 1973

Location
- Location: Zutphen, Netherlands
- Interactive map of Walburgiskerk
- Coordinates: 52°08′23″N 6°11′44″E

Architecture
- Type: Church
- Style: Gothic
- Groundbreaking: 13th Century
- Designated as NHL: Dutch rijksmonument

Tower of the church seen from Martinetsingel

The Walburgiskerk (St. Walburgis Church) is a medieval church in Zutphen, Gelderland, the Netherlands, the oldest and biggest church in Zutphen. Originally consecrated to Saint Walpurga, it became a reformed church in 1591. Its organ is the largest in the Netherlands, dating from the late Renaissance and early Baroque. The church became a listed national monument in 1966.

== History ==
The Walburgiskerk was built in the 13th century as a basilica. It served at the same time as a collegiate church consecrated to Saint Walpurga and the parish church consecrated to St. Mary. Of the original building, the main nave, the middle choir, the transept, and the bottom parts of both towers survived. The rest of the choir and the chapels were built between the middle of the 14th century and 1427. One more floor was added to both towers in the middle of the 15th century, and the north portal at the end of the century. In 1561–1563 the Librije, a public reading area adjacent to the church, was built. The Librije has all its books connected to the wall by metallic chains.

The church became Protestant in 1591. It is the oldest and biggest church in Zutphen. It was restored in 1890–1919, damaged in World War II and restored again after the war. In 1966 the Walburgiskerk was declared a monument of national significance (rijksmonument).

== Architecture ==
The nave has the groin vault with four segments, whereas the choir and the transept have the groin vault with four segments each. There is one tower, which was originally 107.5 metres (353 ft) high, but the spire was destroyed in a fire in 1600. There was another fire in 1948. The tower is currently 76 metres (249 ft) high. The western facade has a romanic-gothic portal.

Inside, there are frescoes of the first quarter of the 15th century in the choir chapels and frescoes of the last quarter of the 15th century and the first half of the 16th century in the groin vault. The frescoes have been restored in the first quarter of the 20th century.

== Organ ==
The organ was built by Hans Henrich Bader, Arnold Bader and Tobias Bader from 1637 to 1643 as the largest extant organ in the Netherlands from the late Renaissance and early Baroque. The instrument was revised and expanded several times, especially by Johannes Wilhelmus Timpe in 1813 and by N. A. Lohman in 1824.

Bert Matter was the organist at the church between 1969 and his retirement in 2002, making many recordings. He initiated a major restoration in 1996 by Reil organ builders, to restore the instrument to its 17th century condition.

The organ has 38 stops on three manuals and a pedal. The buildings high vaults, hard floors and many transepts create a reverberation time of eight seconds. Thanks to the large nave, the reverberation never becomes "muddy" even for fast passages.
