= JPC de Sprengen =

JPC de Sprengen is a penitentiary facility for boys (Juridisch Pedagogisch Centrum, Juridic Pedagogic Center) located in Wapenveld and Zutphen in the Netherlands. The facilities offer treatment as well as shelter or imprisonment.

The two locations have a total capacity for 150 youth aged 12 to 24 years old. Placement in De Sprengen can be done as punishment for a committed crime or as a measure to protect a boy before he commits crimes. The facility is run by the Dutch Ministry of Justice.

De Sprengen services all provinces in the country but in the future they will concentrate on clients from Gelderland, where both sites are located. De Sprengen wants to develop itself as a centre specialized in treating boys from the region with major behavioral problems. In order to maintain this goal, JPC De Sprengen works closely and collaborates with other justice facilities, schools and youth organisations.

== History of JPC de Sprengen ==
In 2001 the former institutions FOC de Kolkemate (closed treatment centre in Zutphen) and Dr. W.L. Slotstichting 'de Dreef' (open centre in Wapenveld) joined forces and became JPC de Sprengen. One of the main reasons to join forces was the option to offer a complete range of treatments within one organisation: for some boys it is preferred to start in a closed setting and switch over to an open setting. With the two facilities now in one organisation this option is much easier to realize: a boy can continue the same treatment programme within one organisation.

== Clients ==
In the JPC de Sprengen boys aged 12 to 24 can be placed. Everyone at De Sprengen is sent by the Justice department: serving a sentence after committing a crime (or waiting for their appearance in court), or as a (protective) measure for boys with serious (behavioral) problems. This last category haven't committed any crime (or better: that is not the reason for going there) but need intensive treatment.
