= Bombing of Zutphen =

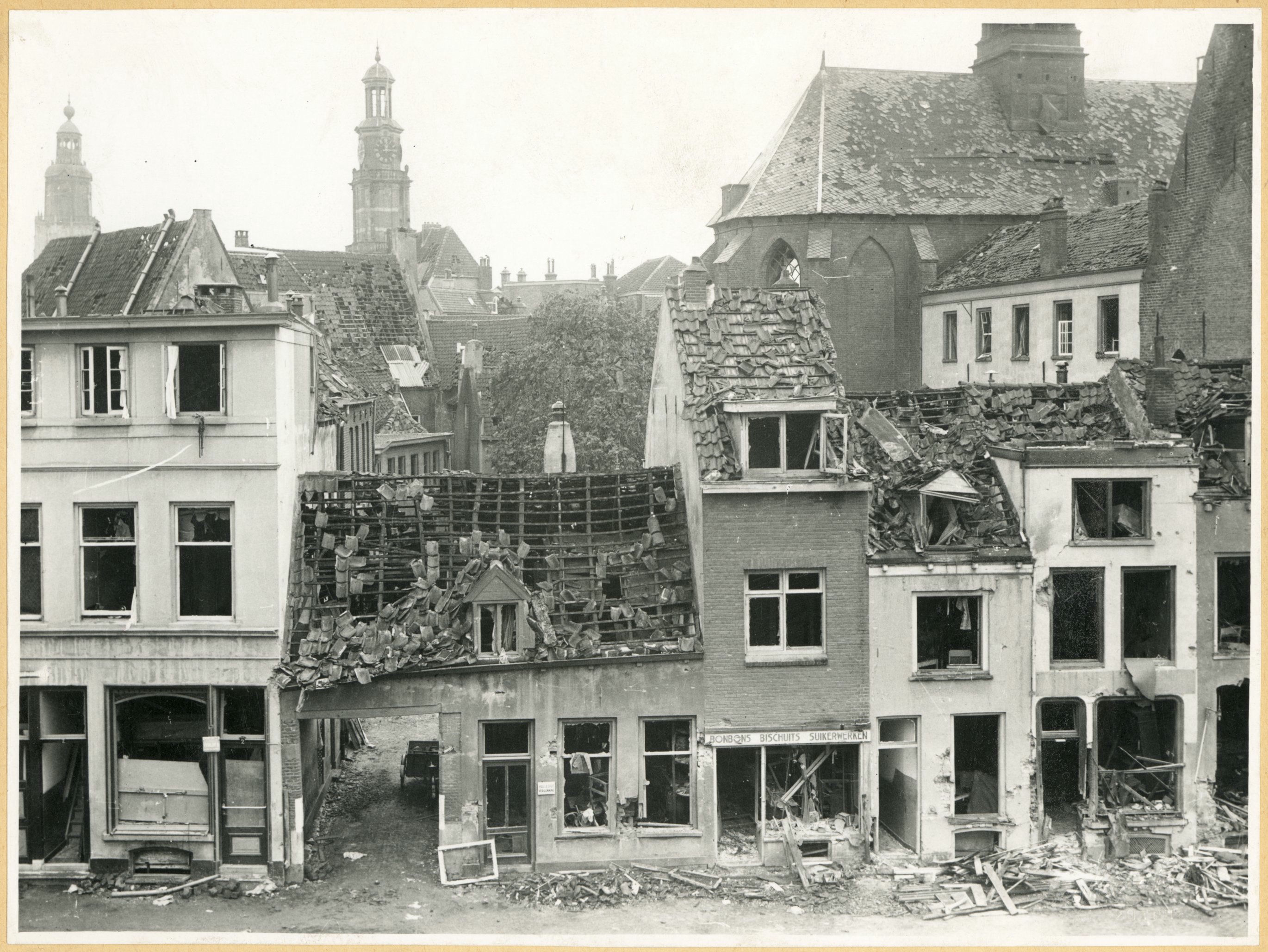
Facades of houses on the Rozengracht after the bombing, 1945

The bombing of Zutphen happened on Saturday afternoon, 14 October 1944. Allied planes wanted to bomb the Oude IJsselbrug (Old Ijssel bridge) in Zutphen to hinder the advance of German troops and weapons toward Arnhem. However the bombs mostly landed on the city, devastating streets including Rozengracht, Barlheze, Kreijnckstraat, and Apenstert. The train station was severely damaged, but remained in use until 1952. More than a hundred civilians were killed and hundreds injured. 92 dead were buried at the general and Catholic cemeteries on the Warnsveldseweg; a number of missing people were never found.

The Gideon monument was unveiled on April 10, 1950, to commemorate the victims of the bombings, as well as the Canadian soldiers who died during the liberation of Zutphen and local residents who died in the former Dutch East Indies during the Second World War. The monument is located in the Kloosterhof near the Broederenkerk on the Rozengracht. At the Zutphen General Cemetery there is a memorial at the grave of thirteen victims. It was unveiled at the very first National Remembrance Day on May 4, 1946.

Two weeks prior to the bombing, on 28 September, Allied bomber forces also targeted a German ammunition train parked between Overweg and the Industrieweg at the Zutphen railway yard. The target was hit, but the exploding ammunition, including armour-piercing grenades, damaged dozens of houses, industrial buildings, and the Buitensociëteit concert hall.

A third, smaller bombardment occurred on 1 February 1945. A few bombs fell at the intersection of Kerksteeg and Rode Torenstraat, and a dozen houses were seriously damaged or completely destroyed. Its strategic purpose is unknown.
