= Psalm 66 =

Biblical psalm

- "Make a joyful noise unto God, all ye lands"
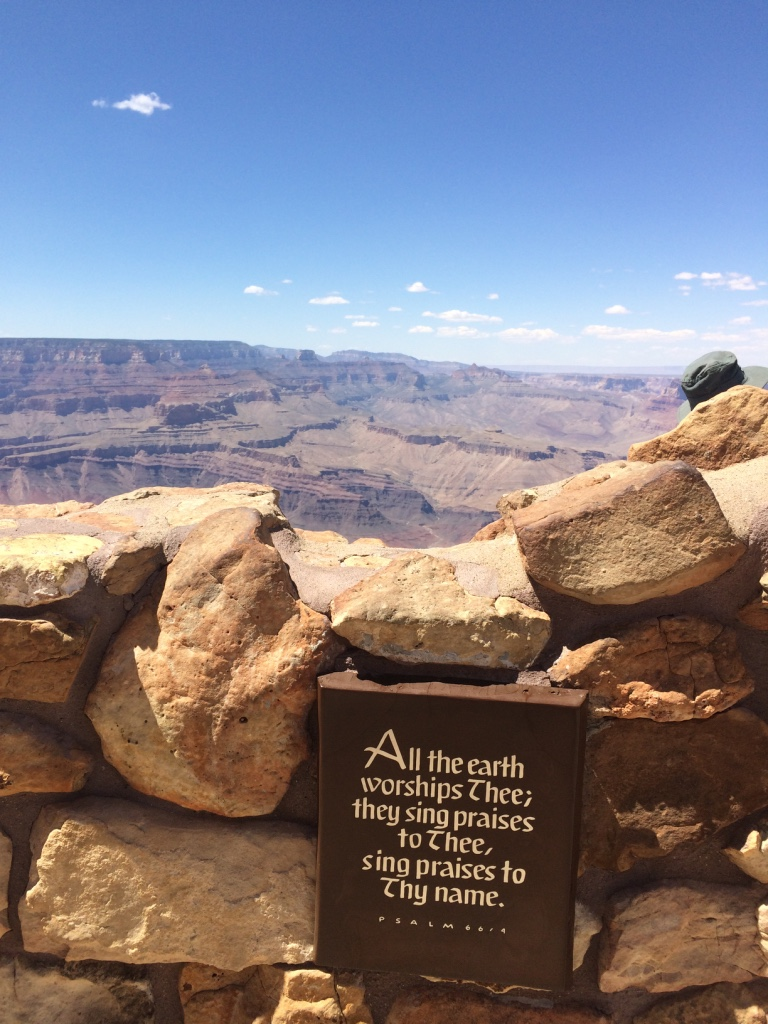
- Psalm 66:4 at the Grand Canyon, Arizona
- Other name: Psalm 65; "Iubilate Deo omnis terra"
- Language: Hebrew (original)

Psalm 66
- ← Psalm 65 Psalm 67 →
- Book: Book of Psalms
- Hebrew Bible part: Ketuvim
- Order in the Hebrew part: 1
- Category: Sifrei Emet
- Christian Bible part: Old Testament
- Order in the Christian part: 19

Psalm 66 is the 66th psalm of the Book of Psalms, beginning in English in the King James Version: "Make a joyful noise unto God, all ye lands". In the slightly different numbering system of the Greek Septuagint version of the Bible and the Latin Vulgate, this psalm is Psalm 65. In Latin, it is known as "Iubilate Deo omnis terra". It is a psalm of thanksgiving probably intended for use at the Passover. The psalm is divided into two parts: in verses 1-12 the community praises God and invites the whole world to join in praise; in verses 13–20, "an individual from the rescued community fulfils a vow to offer a sacrifice of thanksgiving".

The psalm forms a regular part of Jewish, Catholic, Lutheran, Anglican and other Protestant liturgies. It has been set to music.

== Uses ==
=== Judaism ===
- Verse 9 is part of the paragraph Ve'emunah Kal Zot that is recited following the Shema.
- It is recited on the second day of Sukkot in some traditions, on the second day of Passover in some traditions and the sixth day in others.

=== Book of Common Prayer ===
In the Church of England's Book of Common Prayer, this psalm is appointed to be read on the evening of the 12th day of the month.

=== History ===
[Come and see] "what God hath wrought" was the first message sent by telegraph in 1844. The verse was suggested by Annie Ellsworth and inspired by Psalm 66:5 and Psalm 66:16. Standing in the chamber of the Supreme Court, Samuel B. Morse sent a 19-letter message to his assistant Albert Vail in Baltimore, who transmitted the message back. Psalm 66:5 was sent as "come and see what God has done" while Psalm 66:16 was the reply: "Come and see what God has done for me".

== Music ==
Heinrich Schütz set Psalm 66 in a metred version in German, "Jauchzet Gott, alle Lande sehr", SWV 163, as part of the Becker Psalter, first published in 1628.

== Text ==
The following table shows the Hebrew text of the Psalm with vowels, alongside the Koine Greek text in the Septuagint and the English translation from the King James Version. Note that the meaning can slightly differ between these versions, as the Septuagint and the Masoretic Text come from different textual traditions. (Note: A 1917 translation directly from Hebrew to English by the Jewish Publication Society can be found here or here, and an 1844 translation directly from the Septuagint by L. C. L. Brenton can be found here. Both translations are in the public domain.) In the Septuagint, this psalm is numbered Psalm 65.

#	Hebrew	English	Greek
1	לַ֭מְנַצֵּחַ שִׁ֣יר מִזְמ֑וֹר הָרִ֥יעוּ לֵ֝אלֹהִ֗ים כׇּל־הָאָֽרֶץ׃	(To the chief Musician, A Song or Psalm.) Make a joyful noise unto God, all ye lands:	Εἰς τὸ τέλος· ᾠδὴ ψαλμοῦ· ἀναστάσεως. - ΑΛΑΛΑΞΑΤΕ τῷ Κυρίῳ πᾶσα ἡ γῆ,
2	זַמְּר֥וּ כְבֽוֹד־שְׁמ֑וֹ שִׂ֥ימוּ כָ֝ב֗וֹד תְּהִלָּתֽוֹ׃	Sing forth the honour of his name: make his praise glorious.	ψάλατε δὴ τῷ ὀνόματι αὐτοῦ. δότε δόξαν αἰνέσει αὐτοῦ.
3	אִמְר֣וּ לֵ֭אלֹהִים מַה־נּוֹרָ֣א מַעֲשֶׂ֑יךָ בְּרֹ֥ב עֻ֝זְּךָ֗ יְֽכַחֲשׁ֖וּ לְךָ֣ אֹיְבֶֽיךָ׃	Say unto God, How terrible art thou in thy works! through the greatness of thy power shall thine enemies submit themselves unto thee.	εἴπατε τῷ Θεῷ· ὡς φοβερὰ τὰ ἔργα σου· ἐν τῷ πλήθει τῆς δυνάμεώς σου ψεύσονταί σε οἱ ἐχθροί σου.
4	כׇּל־הָאָ֤רֶץ ׀ יִשְׁתַּחֲו֣וּ לְ֭ךָ וִיזַמְּרוּ־לָ֑ךְ יְזַמְּר֖וּ שִׁמְךָ֣ סֶֽלָה׃	All the earth shall worship thee, and shall sing unto thee; they shall sing to thy name. Selah.	πᾶσα ἡ γῆ προσκυνησάτωσάν σοι καὶ ψαλάτωσάν σοι, ψαλάτωσαν τῷ ὀνόματί σου. (διάψαλμα).
5	לְכ֣וּ וּ֭רְאוּ מִפְעֲל֣וֹת אֱלֹהִ֑ים נוֹרָ֥א עֲ֝לִילָ֗ה עַל־בְּנֵ֥י אָדָֽם׃	Come and see the works of God: he is terrible in his doing toward the children of men.	δεῦτε καὶ ἴδετε τὰ ἔργα τοῦ Θεοῦ· φοβερὸς ἐν βουλαῖς ὑπὲρ τοὺς υἱοὺς τῶν ἀνθρώπων,
6	הָ֤פַךְ יָ֨ם ׀ לְֽיַבָּשָׁ֗ה בַּ֭נָּהָר יַעַבְר֣וּ בְרָ֑גֶל שָׁ֝֗ם נִשְׂמְחָה־בּֽוֹ׃	He turned the sea into dry land: they went through the flood on foot: there did we rejoice in him.	ὁ μεταστρέφων τὴν θάλασσαν εἰς ξηράν, ἐν ποταμῷ διελεύσονται ποδί. ἐκεῖ εὐφρανθησόμεθα ἐπ᾿ αὐτῷ,
7	מֹ֘שֵׁ֤ל בִּגְבוּרָת֨וֹ ׀ עוֹלָ֗ם עֵ֭ינָיו בַּגּוֹיִ֣ם תִּצְפֶּ֑ינָה הַסּוֹרְרִ֓ים ׀ אַל־[יָר֖וּמוּ] (ירימו) לָ֣מוֹ סֶֽלָה׃	He ruleth by his power for ever; his eyes behold the nations: let not the rebellious exalt themselves. Selah.	τῷ δεσπόζοντι ἐν τῇ δυναστείᾳ αὐτοῦ τοῦ αἰῶνος. οἱ ὀφθαλμοὶ αὐτοῦ ἐπὶ τὰ ἔθνη ἐπιβλέπουσιν, οἱ παραπικραίνοντες μὴ ὑψούσθωσαν ἐν ἑαυτοῖς. (διάψαλμα).
8	בָּרְכ֖וּ עַמִּ֥ים ׀ אֱלֹהֵ֑ינוּ וְ֝הַשְׁמִ֗יעוּ ק֣וֹל תְּהִלָּתֽוֹ׃	O bless our God, ye people, and make the voice of his praise to be heard:	εὐλογεῖτε, ἔθνη, τὸν Θεὸν ἡμῶν καὶ ἀκουτίσασθε τὴν φωνὴν τῆς αἰνέσεως αὐτοῦ,
9	הַשָּׂ֣ם נַ֭פְשֵׁנוּ בַּחַיִּ֑ים וְלֹֽא־נָתַ֖ן לַמּ֣וֹט רַגְלֵֽנוּ׃	Which holdeth our soul in life, and suffereth not our feet to be moved.	τοῦ θεμένου τὴν ψυχήν μου εἰς ζωήν, καὶ μὴ δόντος εἰς σάλον τοὺς πόδας μου.
10	כִּֽי־בְחַנְתָּ֥נוּ אֱלֹהִ֑ים צְ֝רַפְתָּ֗נוּ כִּצְרׇף־כָּֽסֶף׃	For thou, O God, hast proved us: thou hast tried us, as silver is tried.	ὅτι ἐδοκίμασας ἡμᾶς, ὁ Θεός, ἐπύρωσας ἡμᾶς, ὡς πυροῦται τὸ ἀργύριον·
11	הֲבֵאתָ֥נוּ בַמְּצוּדָ֑ה שַׂ֖מְתָּ מוּעָקָ֣ה בְמׇתְנֵֽינוּ׃	Thou broughtest us into the net; thou laidst affliction upon our loins.	εἰσήγαγες ἡμᾶς εἰς τὴν παγίδα, ἔθου θλίψεις ἐπὶ τὸν νῶτον ἡμῶν.
12	הִרְכַּ֥בְתָּ אֱנ֗וֹשׁ לְרֹ֫אשֵׁ֥נוּ בָּֽאנוּ־בָאֵ֥שׁ וּבַמַּ֑יִם וַ֝תּוֹצִיאֵ֗נוּ לָרְוָיָֽה׃	Thou hast caused men to ride over our heads; we went through fire and through water: but thou broughtest us out into a wealthy place.	ἐπεβίβασας ἀνθρώπους ἐπὶ τὰς κεφαλὰς ἡμῶν, διήλθομεν διὰ πυρὸς καὶ ὕδατος, καὶ ἐξήγαγες ἡμᾶς εἰς ἀναψυχήν.
13	אָב֣וֹא בֵיתְךָ֣ בְעוֹל֑וֹת אֲשַׁלֵּ֖ם לְךָ֣ נְדָרָֽי׃	I will go into thy house with burnt offerings: I will pay thee my vows,	εἰσελεύσομαι εἰς τὸν οἶκόν σου ἐν ὁλοκαυτώμασιν, ἀποδώσω σοι τὰς εὐχάς μου,
14	אֲשֶׁר־פָּצ֥וּ שְׂפָתָ֑י וְדִבֶּר־פִּ֝֗י בַּצַּר־לִֽי׃	Which my lips have uttered, and my mouth hath spoken, when I was in trouble.	ἃς διέστειλε τὰ χείλη μου καὶ ἐλάλησε τὸ στόμα μου ἐν τῇ θλίψει μου·
15	עֹ֘ל֤וֹת מֵיחִ֣ים אַֽעֲלֶה־לָּ֭ךְ עִם־קְטֹ֣רֶת אֵילִ֑ים אֶ֥עֱשֶֽׂה בָקָ֖ר עִם־עַתּוּדִ֣ים סֶֽלָה׃	I will offer unto thee burnt sacrifices of fatlings, with the incense of rams; I will offer bullocks with goats. Selah.	ὁλοκαυτώματα μεμυελωμένα ἀνοίσω σοι μετὰ θυμιάματος καὶ κριῶν, ἀνοίσω σοι βόας μετὰ χιμάρων. (διάψαλμα).
16	לְכוּ־שִׁמְע֣וּ וַ֭אֲסַפְּרָה כׇּל־יִרְאֵ֣י אֱלֹהִ֑ים אֲשֶׁ֖ר עָשָׂ֣ה לְנַפְשִֽׁי׃	Come and hear, all ye that fear God, and I will declare what he hath done for my soul.	δεῦτε ἀκούσατε, καὶ διηγήσομαι, πάντες οἱ φοβούμενοι τὸν Θεόν, ὅσα ἐποίησε τῇ ψυχῇ μου.
17	אֵלָ֥יו פִּֽי־קָרָ֑אתִי וְ֝רוֹמַ֗ם תַּ֣חַת לְשׁוֹנִֽי׃	I cried unto him with my mouth, and he was extolled with my tongue.	πρὸς αὐτὸν τῷ στόματί μου ἐκέκραξα καὶ ὕψωσα ὑπὸ τὴν γλῶσσάν μου.
18	אָ֭וֶן אִם־רָאִ֣יתִי בְלִבִּ֑י לֹ֖א יִשְׁמַ֣ע ׀ אֲדֹנָֽי׃	If I regard iniquity in my heart, the Lord will not hear me:	ἀδικίαν εἰ ἐθεώρουν ἐν καρδίᾳ μου, μὴ εἰσακουσάτω μου Κύριος.
19	אָ֭כֵן שָׁמַ֣ע אֱלֹהִ֑ים הִ֝קְשִׁ֗יב בְּק֣וֹל תְּפִלָּתִֽי׃	But verily God hath heard me; he hath attended to the voice of my prayer.	διὰ τοῦτο εἰσήκουσέ μου ὁ Θεός, προσέσχε τῇ φωνῇ τῆς δεήσεώς μου.
20	בָּר֥וּךְ אֱלֹהִ֑ים אֲשֶׁ֥ר לֹֽא־הֵסִ֘יר תְּפִלָּתִ֥י וְ֝חַסְדּ֗וֹ מֵאִתִּֽי׃	Blessed be God, which hath not turned away my prayer, nor his mercy from me.	εὐλογητὸς ὁ Θεός, ὃς οὐκ ἀπέστησε τὴν προσευχήν μου καὶ τὸ ἔλεος αὐτοῦ ἀπ᾿ ἐμοῦ.

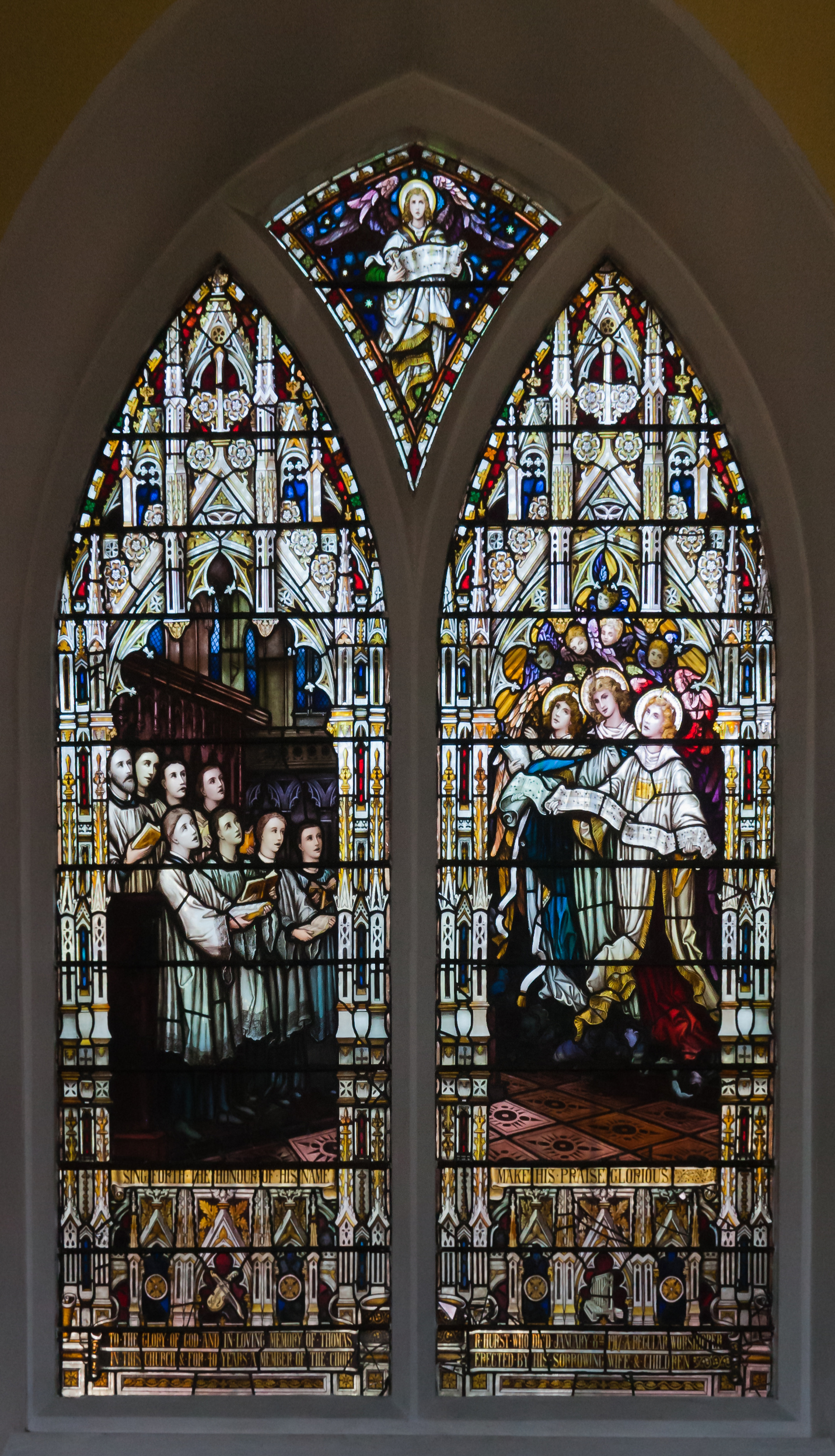
Stained glass window of St. Brendan's Church in Bantry, depicting Psalm 66:2: Sing forth the honour of his name (left side) and Make his praise glorious (right side), created c. 1917 by James Watson & Co., Youghal
