= Psalm 64 =

64th psalm

- "Hear my voice, O God, in my prayer"
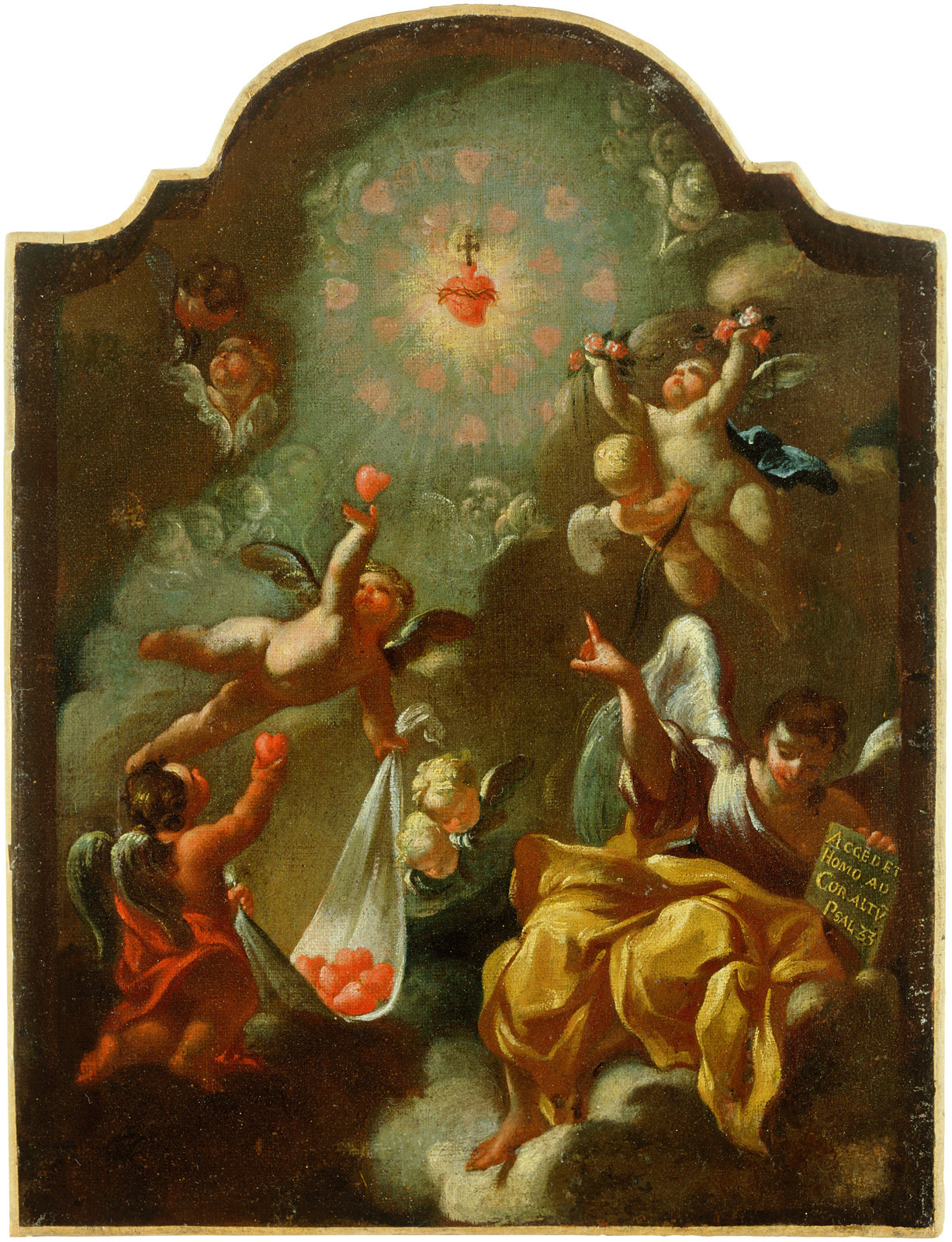
- 1705 Dutch painting based on Psalm 64:6
- Other name: Psalm 63; "Exaudi Deus orationem meam"
- Language: Hebrew (original)

Psalm 64
- ← Psalm 63 Psalm 65 →
- Book: Book of Psalms
- Hebrew Bible part: Ketuvim
- Order in the Hebrew part: 1
- Category: Sifrei Emet
- Christian Bible part: Old Testament
- Order in the Christian part: 19

Psalm 64 is the 64th psalm of the Book of Psalms, beginning in English in the King James Version: "Hear my voice, O God, in my prayer: preserve my life from fear of the enemy". In the slightly different numbering system of the Greek Septuagint version of the Bible and the Latin Vulgate, this psalm is Psalm 63. In Latin, it is known as "Exaudi Deus orationem meam". It is directed against the "wicked" (רעע) and "workers of iniquity" (פֹּעֲלֵי אָֽוֶן), whom God shall shoot with an arrow (וַיֹּרֵם אֱלֹהִים חֵץ). The psalm may be treated as a prayer for deliverance from enemies, or as a thanksgiving, or a testimony to divine judgement.

The psalm forms a regular part of Jewish, Catholic, Lutheran, Anglican and other Protestant liturgies. It has been set to music.

== Content ==
Verses 6–7 (Vulgate: Psalm 63:7-8) have been the subject of confusion in early Bible translations: the King James Version translates the Hebrew as:

"They search out iniquities; they accomplish a diligent search: both the inward thought of every one of them, and the heart, is deep. But God shall shoot at them with an arrow; suddenly shall they be wounded."

But in the Vulgate, Jerome, based on the Septuagint text, rendered this as

Scrutati sunt iniquitates; defecerunt scrutantes scrutinio. Accedet homo ad cor altum, et exaltabitur Deus. Sagittæ parvulorum factæ sunt plagæ eorum,

which translates to "They have searched after iniquities: they have failed in their search. Man shall accede to a lofty heart: And God shall be exalted. The arrows of children are their wounds."

The adjective altum in Latin has both the meanings "high" and "deep", and it is here used to translate LXX βαθεῖα "deep", but it offered itself to an interpretation of an "exalted heart". The "arrows of children" (Sagittæ parvulum) render LXX βέλος νηπίων, which has no correspondence in the Hebrew text as it has come down to us.

Jerome's translation gave rise to mystical interpretations involving the Sacred Heart in early modern Christian tradition. For example, Serafino Porrecta, in his Commentaria in Psalterium Davidicum, interprets this in terms of Christ himself being the Man who can "accede to that exalted heart", Hic [Christus] solus accessit ad illum cor altum.

The arrow of God leads to a turning to God. In verse 4 the wicked shoot arrows secretly at the righteous. In verse 7, God shoots an arrow (arrows, plural, in some translations) at the wicked, but for some these will be saving arrows, as in verse 9: men will "proclaim the works of God and ponder what he has done".

== Uses ==
=== Catholic Church ===
This psalm was chosen by St. Benedict of Nursia around 530, for the solemn office at the lauds of Wednesday. In the Rule of St. Benedict, it was recited or sung after Psalm 51 (50) and followed by Psalm 65 (64) (chapter XIII). A number of abbeys still retain this tradition dating from the 6th century.

In the current Liturgy of the Hours, Psalm 64 is recited or sung at the midday office on the Saturday of the second week of a four-weekly cycle of liturgical prayers.

=== Book of Common Prayer ===
In the Church of England's Book of Common Prayer, this psalm is appointed to be read on the morning of the 12th day of the month.

== Music ==
Heinrich Schütz set Psalm 64 in a metred version in German, "Erhör mein Stimm, Herr, wenn ich klag", SWV 161, as part of the Becker Psalter, first published in 1628. Zdeněk Fibich composed a setting, Hud. 155, for mixed choir in 1879.

== Text ==
The following table shows the Hebrew text of the Psalm with vowels, alongside the Koine Greek text in the Septuagint and the English translation from the King James Version. Note that the meaning can slightly differ between these versions, as the Septuagint and the Masoretic Text come from different textual traditions. (Note: A 1917 translation directly from Hebrew to English by the Jewish Publication Society can be found here or here, and an 1844 translation directly from the Septuagint by L. C. L. Brenton can be found here. Both translations are in the public domain.) In the Septuagint, this psalm is numbered Psalm 63.

#	Hebrew	English	Greek
(Note: In the Jewish verse numbering, the ascription of this psalm is verse 1, and the rest of the psalm begins from verse 2. However, the Christian verse numbering does not count the ascription.)	לַמְנַצֵּ֗חַ מִזְמ֥וֹר לְדָוִֽד׃	(To the chief Musician, A Psalm of David.)	Εἰς τὸ τέλος· ψαλμὸς τῷ Δαυΐδ. -
1	שְׁמַע־אֱלֹהִ֣ים קוֹלִ֣י בְשִׂיחִ֑י מִפַּ֥חַד א֝וֹיֵ֗ב תִּצֹּ֥ר חַיָּֽי׃	Hear my voice, O God, in my prayer: preserve my life from fear of the enemy.	ΕΙΣΑΚΟΥΣΟΝ, ὁ Θεός, τῆς φωνῆς μου, ἐν τῷ δέεσθαί με πρὸς σέ, ἀπὸ φόβου ἐχθροῦ ἐξελοῦ τὴν ψυχήν μου.
2	תַּ֭סְתִּירֵנִי מִסּ֣וֹד מְרֵעִ֑ים מֵ֝רִגְשַׁ֗ת פֹּ֣עֲלֵי אָֽוֶן׃	Hide me from the secret counsel of the wicked; from the insurrection of the workers of iniquity:	ἐσκέπασάς με ἀπὸ συστροφῆς πονηρευομένων, ἀπὸ πλήθους ἐργαζομένων ἀδικίαν,
3	אֲשֶׁ֤ר שָׁנְנ֣וּ כַחֶ֣רֶב לְשׁוֹנָ֑ם דָּֽרְכ֥וּ חִ֝צָּ֗ם דָּבָ֥ר מָֽר׃	Who whet their tongue like a sword, and bend their bows to shoot their arrows, even bitter words:	οἵτινες ἠκόνησαν ὡς ῥομφαίαν τὰς γλώσσας αὐτῶν, ἐνέτειναν τόξον αὐτῶν πρᾶγμα πικρὸν
4	לִירֹ֣ת בַּמִּסְתָּרִ֣ים תָּ֑ם פִּתְאֹ֥ם יֹ֝רֻ֗הוּ וְלֹ֣א יִירָֽאוּ׃	That they may shoot in secret at the perfect: suddenly do they shoot at him, and fear not.	τοῦ κατατοξεῦσαι ἐν ἀποκρύφοις ἄμωμον, ἐξάπινα κατατοξεύσουσιν αὐτὸν καὶ οὐ φοβηθήσονται.
5	יְחַזְּקוּ־לָ֨מוֹ ׀ דָּ֘בָ֤ר רָ֗ע יְֽ֭סַפְּרוּ לִטְמ֣וֹן מוֹקְשִׁ֑ים אָ֝מְר֗וּ מִ֣י יִרְאֶה־לָּֽמוֹ׃	They encourage themselves in an evil matter: they commune of laying snares privily; they say, Who shall see them?	ἐκραταίωσαν ἑαυτοῖς λόγον πονηρόν, διηγήσαντο τοῦ κρύψαι παγίδας, εἶπαν· τίς ὄψεται αὐτούς;
6	יַ֥חְפְּֽשׂוּ עוֹלֹ֗ת תַּ֭מְנוּ חֵ֣פֶשׂ מְחֻפָּ֑שׂ וְקֶ֥רֶב אִ֝֗ישׁ וְלֵ֣ב עָמֹֽק׃	They search out iniquities; they accomplish a diligent search: both the inward thought of every one of them, and the heart, is deep.	ἐξηρεύνησαν ἀνομίαν, ἐξέλιπον ἐξερευνῶντες ἐξερευνήσεις. προσελεύσεται ἄνθρωπος, καὶ καρδία βαθεῖα,
7	וַיֹּרֵ֗ם אֱלֹ֫הִ֥ים חֵ֥ץ פִּתְא֑וֹם הָ֝י֗וּ מַכּוֹתָֽם׃	But God shall shoot at them with an arrow; suddenly shall they be wounded.	καὶ ὑψωθήσεται, ὁ Θεός. βέλος νηπίων ἐγενήθησαν αἱ πληγαὶ αὐτῶν,
8	וַיַּכְשִׁיל֣וּהוּ עָלֵ֣ימוֹ לְשׁוֹנָ֑ם יִ֝תְנֹדְד֗וּ כׇּל־רֹ֥אֵה בָֽם׃	So they shall make their own tongue to fall upon themselves: all that see them shall flee away.	καὶ ἐξησθένησαν ἐπ᾿ αὐτοὺς αἱ γλῶσσαι αὐτῶν. ἐταράχθησαν πάντες οἱ θεωροῦντες αὐτούς,
9	וַיִּֽירְא֗וּ כׇּל־אָ֫דָ֥ם וַ֭יַּגִּידוּ פֹּ֥עַל אֱלֹהִ֗ים וּֽמַעֲשֵׂ֥הוּ הִשְׂכִּֽילוּ׃	And all men shall fear, and shall declare the work of God; for they shall wisely consider of his doing.	καὶ ἐφοβήθη πᾶς ἄνθρωπος. καὶ ἀνήγγειλαν τὰ ἔργα τοῦ Θεοῦ καὶ τὰ ποιήματα αὐτοῦ συνῆκαν.
10	יִשְׂמַ֬ח צַדִּ֣יק בַּ֭יהֹוָה וְחָ֣סָה ב֑וֹ וְ֝יִתְהַלְל֗וּ כׇּל־יִשְׁרֵי־לֵֽב׃	The righteous shall be glad in the LORD, and shall trust in him; and all the upright in heart shall glory.	εὐφρανθήσεται δίκαιος ἐν τῷ Κυρίῳ καὶ ἐλπιεῖ ἐπ᾿ αὐτόν, καὶ ἐπαινεθήσονται πάντες οἱ εὐθεῖς τῇ καρδίᾳ.
