= Zutphen =

- City and municipality
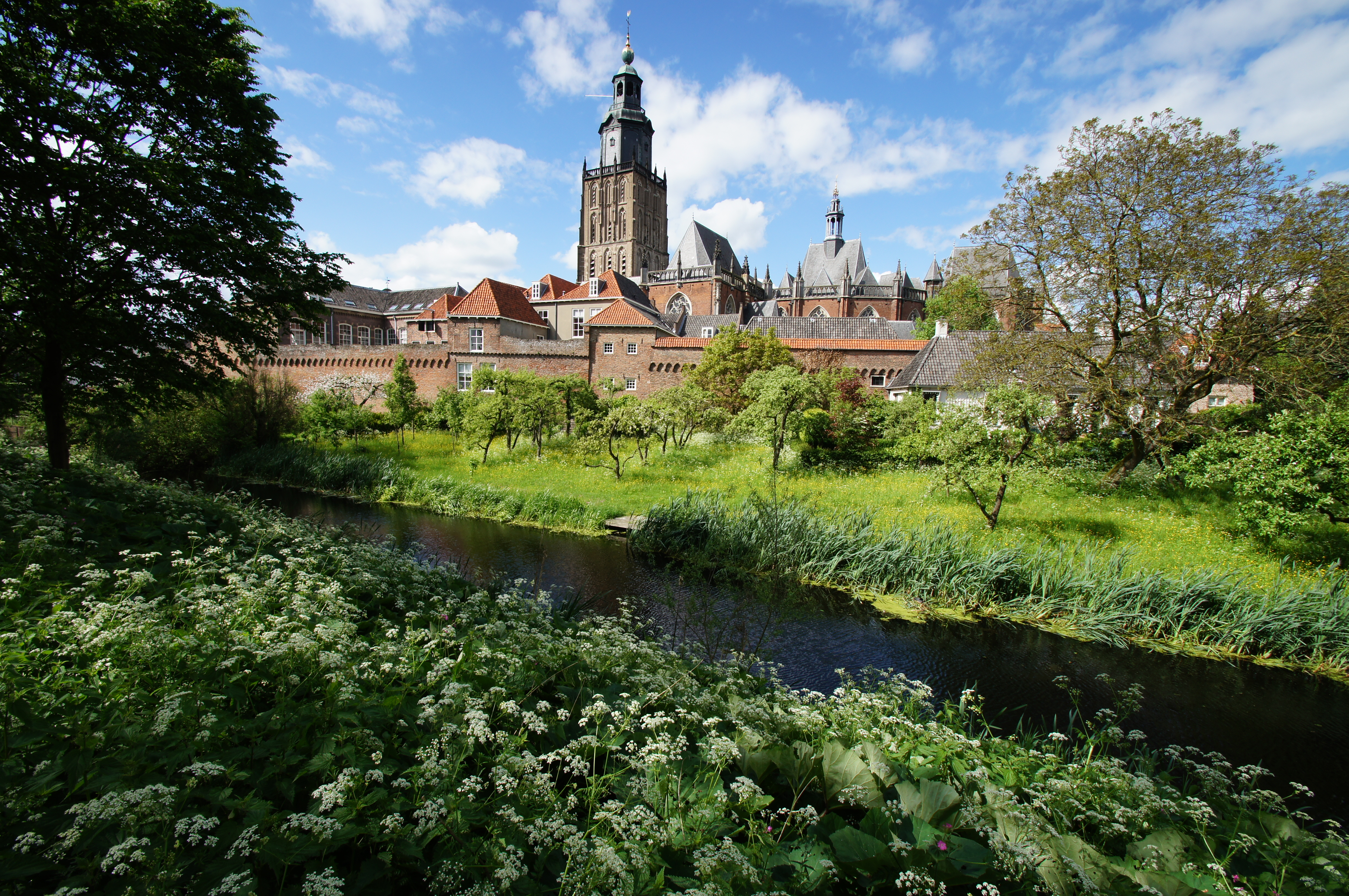
- St. Walburgis' Church

- Flag Coat of arms

- Location in Gelderland

- Location within the Netherlands Location within Europe
- Coordinates: 52°08′24″N 06°11′42″E
- Country: Netherlands
- Province: Gelderland

Government
  - Body: Municipal council
  - Mayor: Wimar Jaeger (D66)

Area
  - Total: 42.93 km^{2} (16.58 sq mi)
  - Land: 40.95 km^{2} (15.81 sq mi)
  - Water: 1.98 km^{2} (0.76 sq mi)
- Elevation: 10 m (33 ft)

Population (January 2021)
  - Total: 48,111
  - Density: 1,175/km^{2} (3,040/sq mi)
- Demonym: Zutphenaar
- Time zone: UTC+1 (CET)
  - Summer (DST): UTC+2 (CEST)
- Postcode: 7200–7207, 7230–7232
- Area code: 0575
- Website: www.zutphen.nl

Zutphen (Dutch pronunciation: [ˈzʏtfə(n)]; Dutch Low Saxon: Zutfent) is a city and municipality located in the province of Gelderland, Netherlands. It lies some 30 km (18.6 mi) northeast of Arnhem, on the eastern bank of the river IJssel at the point where it is joined by the Berkel. First mentioned in the 11th century, the place-name appears to mean "south fen" (zuid-veen in modern Dutch). In 2005, the municipality of Zutphen was merged with the municipality of Warnsveld, retaining its name. In 2021, the municipality had a population of 48,111.

== History ==
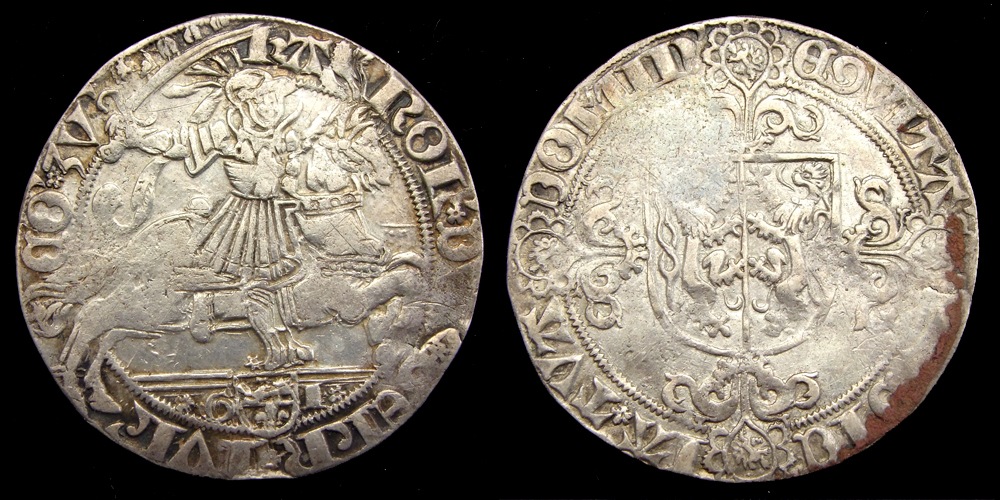
"Snaphaanschelling" struck in Zutphen

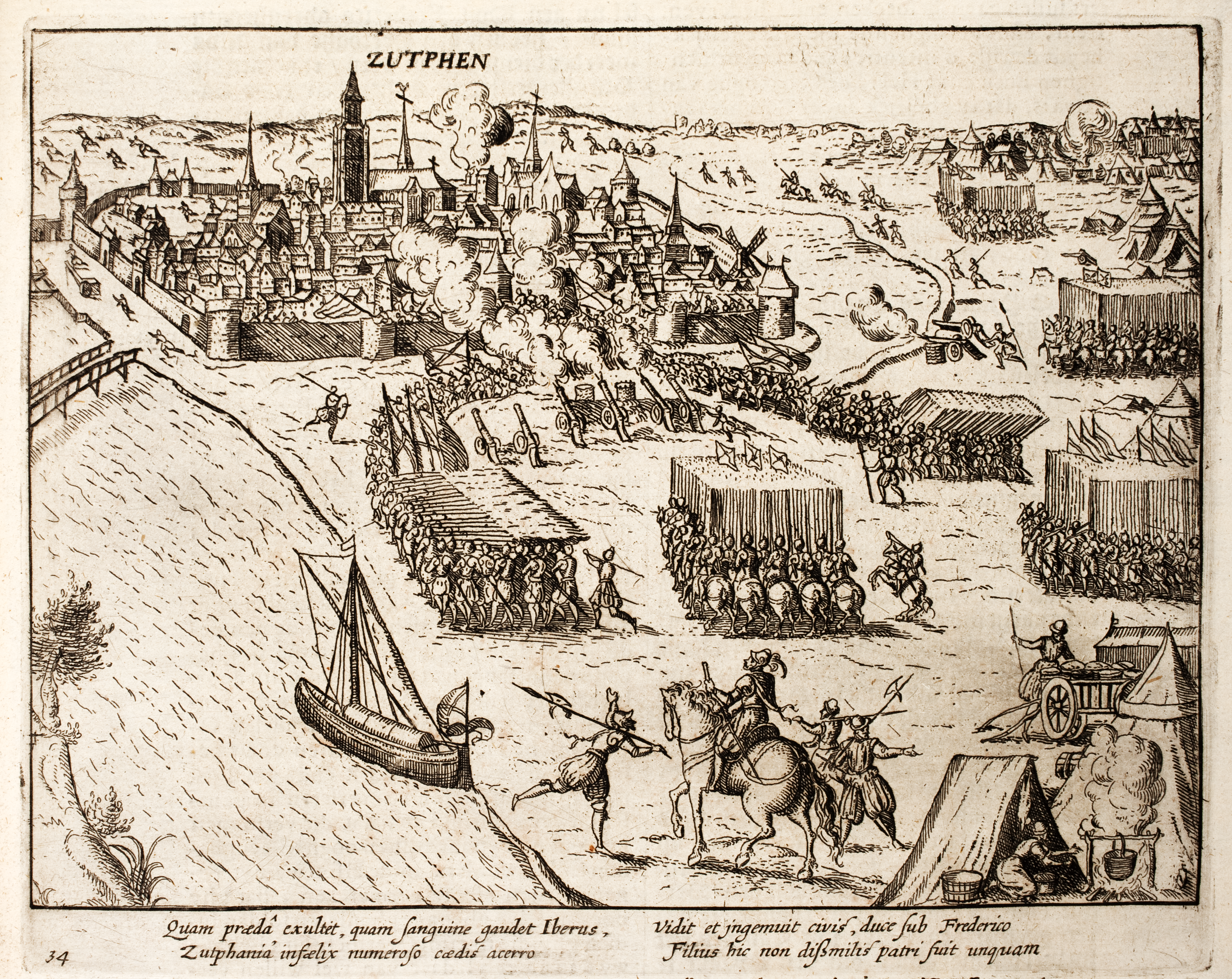
Zutphen taken by Fadrique Álvarez de Toledo on 16 October 1572 during the Eighty Years' War

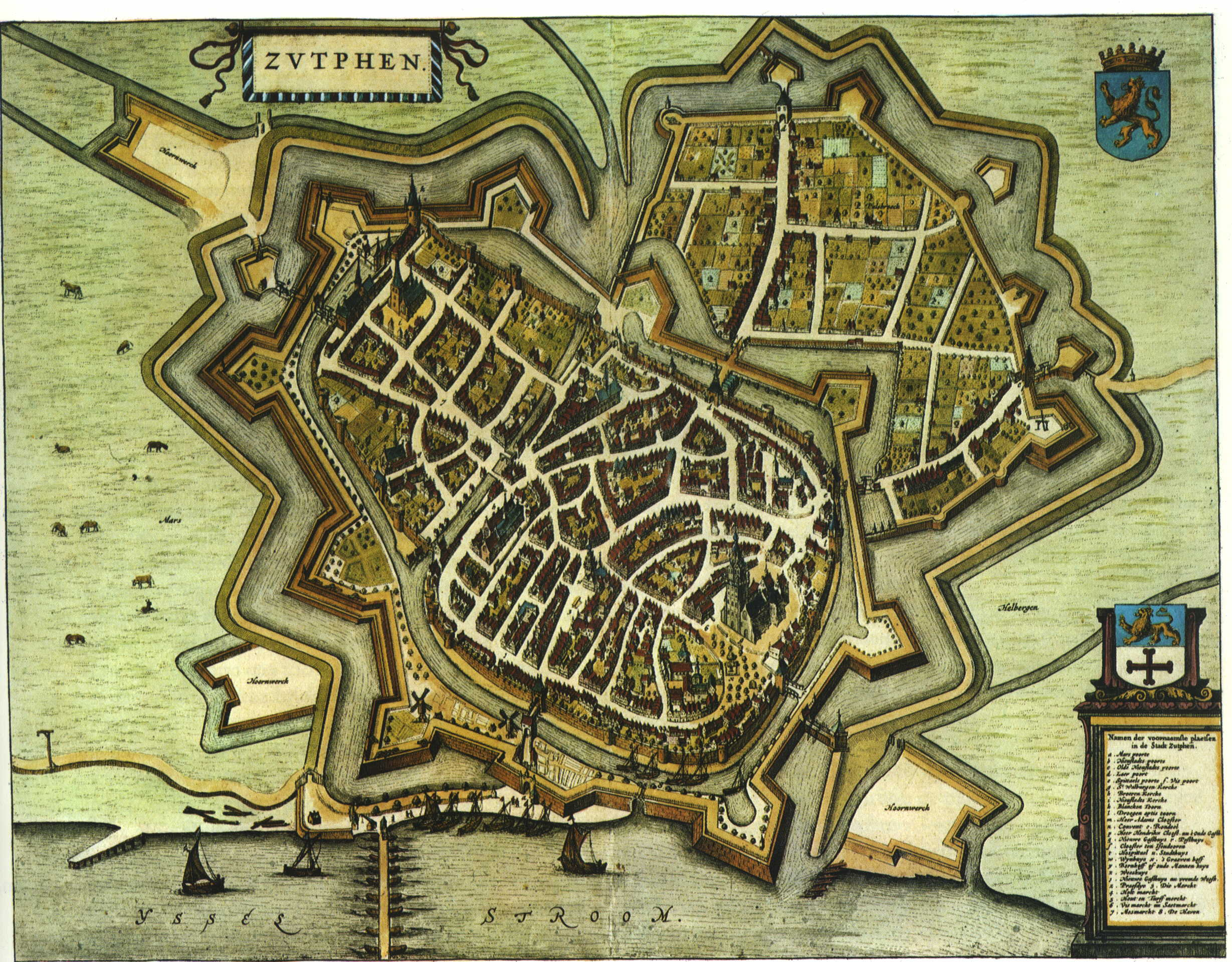
1649 map of Zutphen in Willem and Joan Blaeu's "Toonneel der Steden"

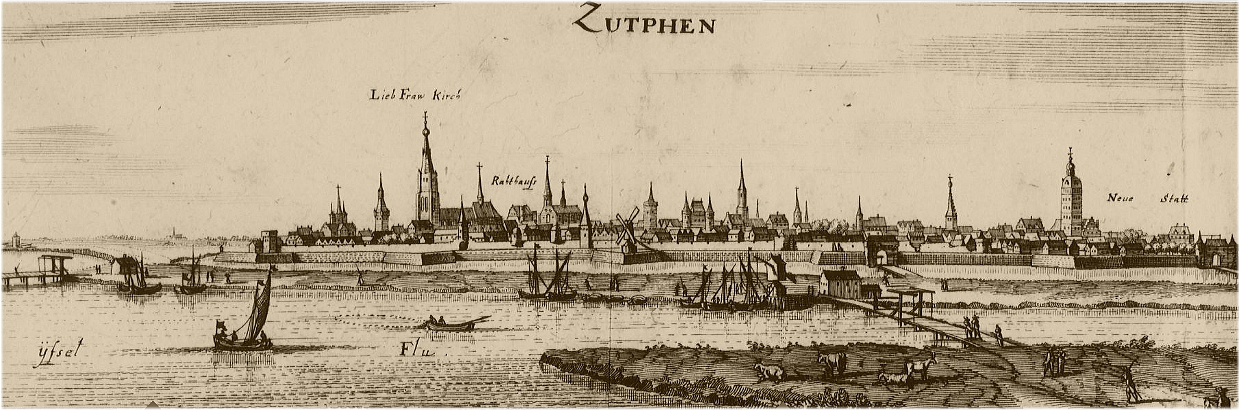
Zutphen (1654)

In about 300 AD, a Germanic settlement was the first permanent town on a complex of the low river dunes. While many such settlements were abandoned in the early Middle Ages, Zutphen, on the strategic confluence of IJssel and Berkel, stayed. After the incorporation of the IJssel lands in Charlemagne's Francia, Zutphen became a local centre of governance under the Count of Zutphen. The Normans raided and ravaged it in 882. Afterwards, a circular fortress was built to protect the budding town against Viking attacks.

In the eleventh century, Zutphen was a royal residence for a number of years; a pfalz was built, together with a large chapter church, the predecessor of the present St. Walburgis. The counts of Zutphen acquired a lot of power until the line of counts became extinct in the twelfth century. After the death of her father and her brother, Ermengarde, the heiress of Zutphen married the count of Guelders; her son Henry I, Count of Guelders was the first to have both titles.

The settlement received town rights between 1191 and 1196, allowing it to self govern and have a judicial court. One of the oldest towns in the country, only Utrecht and Deventer preceded it in receiving town rights. Zutphen, in turn, became the mother town of several other towns in Guelders, such as Arnhem, Doetinchem, Doesburg, Lochem, Harderwijk, Venlo and Emmerich. It also became part of the Hanseatic League, a group of towns with great wealth; this league was the economic centre in that part of Europe.

During the 12th century, coins were minted in Zutphen by the Counts of Guelders and Zutphen: Henry I (c. 1150–1181) and Otto I (1182–1207). Although the city had minting rights for a few centuries, this was only actively used during four periods: 1478–1480, 1582–1583, 1604–1605 and 1687–1692.

The largest and oldest church of the city is the St. Walburgis Church, which originally dates from the eleventh century. The present Gothic building contains monuments of the former counts of Zutphen, a fourteenth-century candelabrum, an elaborate copper font (1527), and a monument to the Van Heeckeren family (1700). The chapter-house's library (Librije) contains a pre-Reformation collection, including some valuable manuscripts and incunabula. It is considered one of only five remaining medieval libraries in Europe (in England and Italy). This chained library's books are still chained to their ancient wooden desk – a custom from centuries ago, when the "public library" used chains to prevent theft.

Having been fortified, the town withstood several sieges, especially during the Eighty Years' War, the most celebrated fight under its walls being the Battle of Zutphen in September 1586 when Sir Philip Sidney was mortally wounded. Surrendered over the Spanish in 1587 by English defector Rowland York, Zutphen was recovered by Maurice, Prince of Orange, in the 1591 siege, and except for two short periods, one in 1672 and the other during the French Revolutionary Wars, it has since remained a part of the Netherlands. Its fortifications were dismantled in 1874. In World War II, the town was bombed several times by the allied forces because the bridge over the IJssel was vital to support the German troops at Arnhem after the Operation Market Garden. After two weeks of battle, the town was liberated on 14 April 1945. After the war, a renovation program started. Nowadays, Zutphen has one of the best-preserved medieval town centres of northwestern Europe, including the remains of the medieval town wall and a few hundred buildings dating from the 13th, 14th and 15th centuries.

== Modern city ==
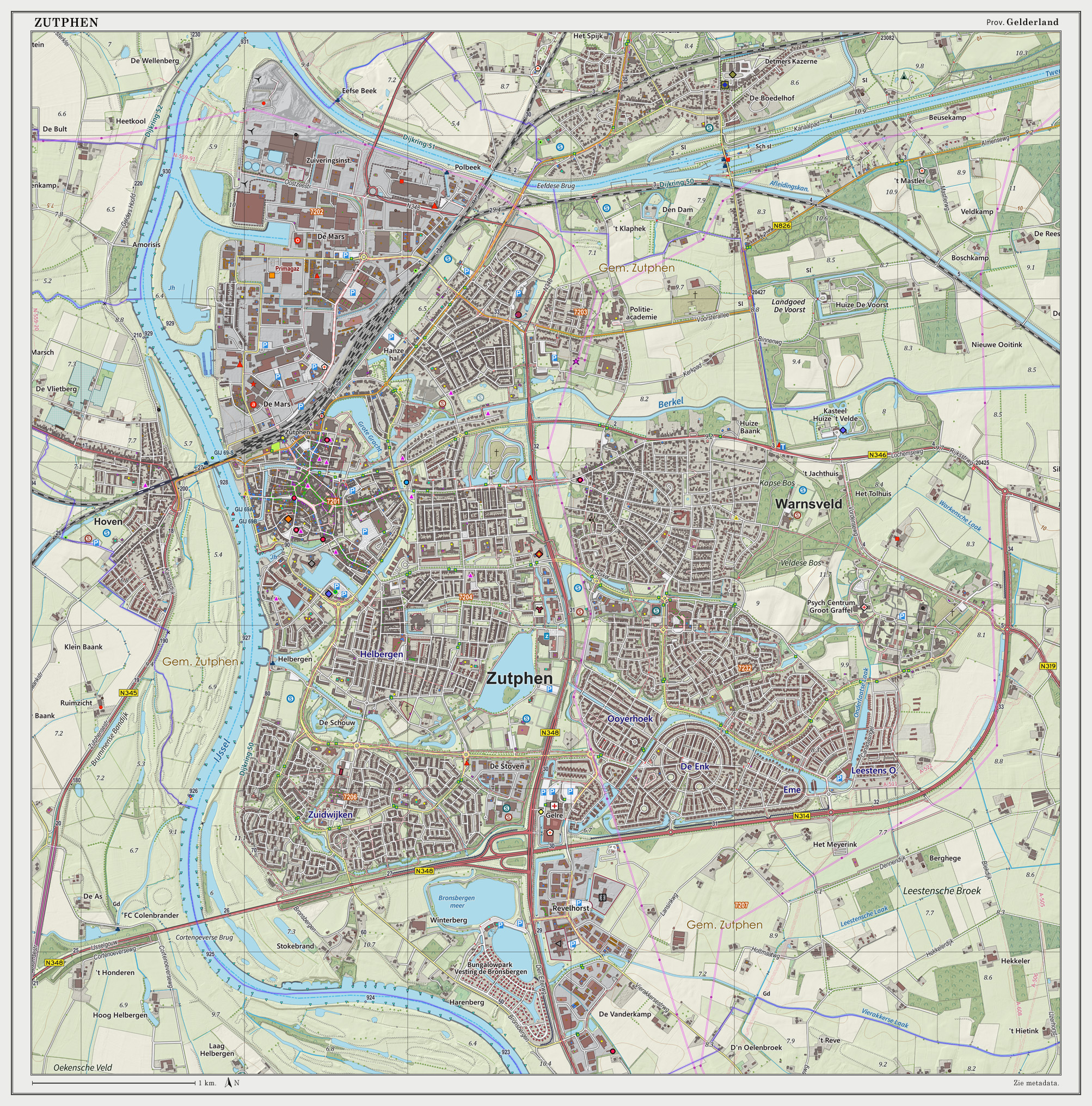
Map of the city of Zutphen, 2014

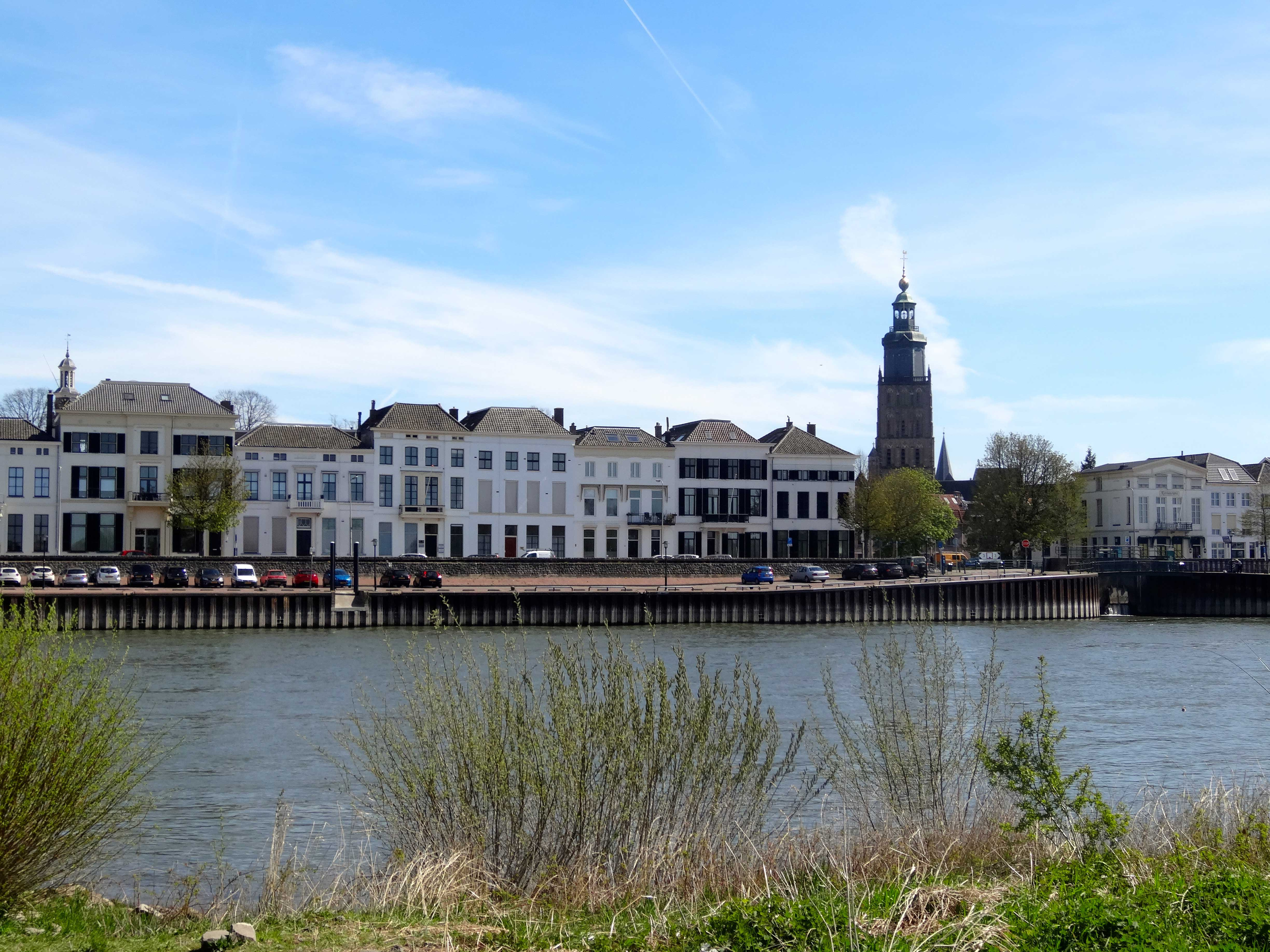
The IJssel river in Zutphen

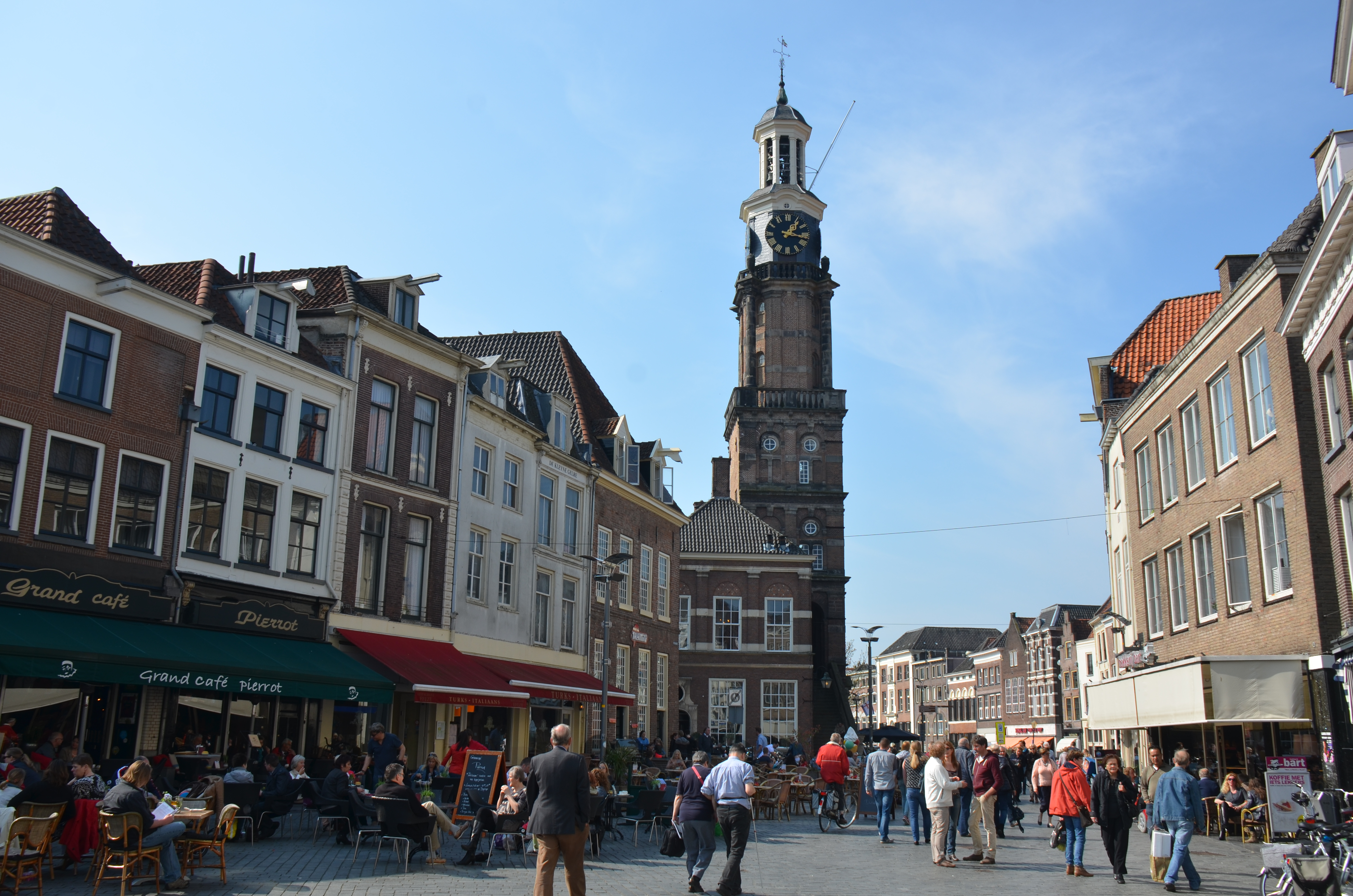
Zutphen's old city centre

The old center survived the Second World War almost in its entirety despite the bombing of Zutphen. However, some parts of the city were lost, especially the area around the railway station, in the northern part of the city centre, known as the Nieuwstad (English: New City). The city center includes many monumental buildings dating back to the 14th and 15th centuries, and some even date back to the 13th century, such as a retirement home area. There are also remains of the old town walls in several places.

Today, Zutphen is a modern small city. The urban area, which includes the village of Warnsveld, has about 51,000 inhabitants. Food shops are open from 8:30; Other stores are open from 9:30 to 18:00 on weekdays, on Friday evenings until 21:00 and on Saturdays until 17:00. Some stores open earlier, and the larger supermarkets usually stay open until 22:00.

== Culture ==
=== Interesting buildings and squares ===
Zutphen contains many historical buildings with a tower, it is thus often called the tower city. As there are almost no modern high-rise buildings in the city centre, the historical tower spires are very visible and form the skyline. The title of 'tower city' is often used in advertising to draw tourists.

==== Religious architecture ====
The St. Walburgis' Church was built as a Roman collegiate church around 1050 and initiated by the Bishop Burchard of Utrecht in 1105. After that, between 1200 and 1270, the church was rebuilt to a Romano-Gothic basilica. Later in the 14th century additional parts were added. After a fire in the belfry in 1446, the stone tower was remodelled between 1482–1484 where a large needle spire was added, resulting in a total height of 107.5 meters. Higher than the Dom Tower of Utrecht which was 104 meters at the time, though, after a lightning strike in 1600 which resulted in a destructive fire, the current tower is 76 meters tall after restorations in 1633. There are six bells in the tower, which are still rung by hand.

Since 1561 a library called the Librije was added to the church. It was founded as a public library for the rich citizens of Zutphen. The library contains an important collection of 15th to 17th century books.

The Broederen (brothers) church is a largely early 14th-century monastery church of the Dominican order. Since 1983 the church has been used as the city's public library, and it has recently been extensively restored. On top of the church, a roof turret from 1771 contains the porter's bell. This bell is still rung every day between 9:50 and 22:00 the time at which, until 1853, the city gates would be closed.

The Nieuwstadt (new city) church houses the Catholic community. It was founded as a parish church around 1250. Since then, it has been expanded, remodelled and restored many times. It has four original medieval bells.

==== Civic architecture ====
The Drogenaps tower was built between 1444 and 1446 as a city gate. In 1465 the entrance was bricked up, after which it became known as a tower instead of a gate. City musician Tonis Drogenap lived there around 1555, and the tower's current name is derived from him. From 1888 to 1927, the tower was used as a water tower.

The Wijnhuis (Winery) Tower was built between 1618 and 1642 by the city master builder Emond Hellenraet, influenced by Hendrick de Keyser. In 1644 the brothers Pieter and François Hemony made the world's first correctly tuned carillon for this tower. During the summer months, carillon concerts are regularly held.

The Bourgonje tower was a defensive turret built in 1457. It was built during the Gelderland-Burgundian war. In this tower, the Dutch theologian and philosopher Johannes Florentius Martinet wrote his Katechismus der Natuur (Catechism of Nature).

The Berkel gate is part of the city wall on the east side of the medieval city. This gate over the river Berkel connected the old and new cities. It was built in 1320. It also had a western counterpart, but that gate was demolished in 1772.

==== Other interesting sights in Zutphen ====
The city of Zutphen had almost 400 national monuments and over 500 local monuments. It is one of the most important and well-preserved historical city centers in the Netherlands. Zutphen has a great many medieval, especially 14th-century, houses. These houses, often with ornamental facades, can be seen throughout the city center. There are several large 18th and 19th century buildings near the old city market that used to belong to well-to-do citizens and merchants.

== Regional center ==
=== Juridical center ===
Zutphen, although relatively small, is a center for Dutch legal institutions. Zutphen houses one of the 13 Dutch courts, as well as the national training institution for judges and public prosecutors (SSR), the national police academy for senior police investigators, three prisons, and a large number of lawyers. The early emergence of Zutphen in the Middle Ages as the main town of a county explains its prominent position in the juridical system.

Besides a 'normal' prison, the JPC de Sprengen penitentiary facility for boys is also located in Zutphen. There are several buildings: new institutions replacing the old facilities, but the old prisons remained open after the completion of the new facilities. Only the old prison called Lunette did not meet today's standards and closed in 2008.

=== Medical centre ===
Located in Zutphen is the "Spittal", location of the Gelre Ziekenhuizen (Gelre Hospitals) group. This regular hospital offers all common specialties (no cardio-thoracic or neurosurgery) and a 24/7 emergency department. It is located in the southeastern part of the town, in the district of Leesten. A sizable number of practitioners of alternative medicine are located in Zutphen.

=== Educational centre ===
Zutphen is home to several well-known schools for secondary education on all levels. These include the "Het Stedelijk" (Dalton plan education and bilingual education), "Baudartius College", "Vrije School Zutphen", (a "Vrije School" being a Waldorf School), and "Isendoorn College" (with bilingual education, located in Warnsveld). Students from a wide area around Zutphen learn at these schools.

== Transport ==
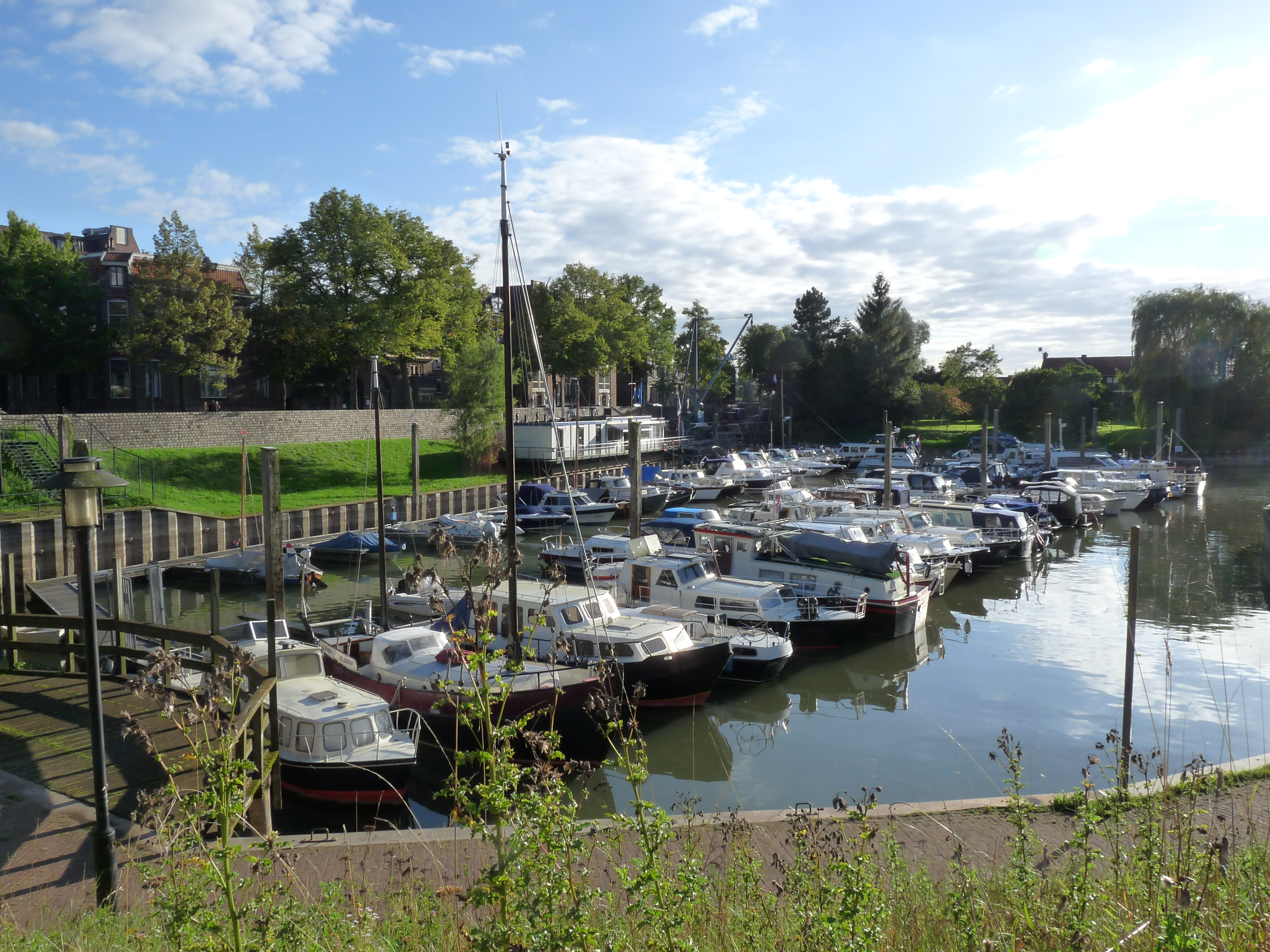
Port of Zutphen

=== Rail ===
Zutphen railway station is an important regional railway centre. The main electrified lines, to Deventer and Zwolle in the north, and to Arnhem and Nijmegen in the south, are run by the national railway company Nederlandse Spoorwegen (NS). The secondary lines to Winterswijk and Apeldoorn are operated by Arriva. The secondary line to Hengelo is operated by Blauwnet (a division of Arriva). The regional rail service is run by a special subsidiary of the NS. All secondary lines run diesel trains. Zutphen's old station building (1863), upgraded in 1875, was partly destroyed during World War II. In the early 1950s a modern new station was built, a typical post-war building with concrete as its main material. However, in October 2007, the station building was designated as a State Monument. In 2006 and 2007, the railway station area was completely renovated: a new bus terminal and an underground bicycle parking lot were constructed, and the main road leading from the railway station to the town centre was turned into a road for pedestrians and cyclists only.

=== Road ===
Zutphen lies 15 kilometers south of the A1 motorway, which can be entered where it passes Deventer. From there the A1 leads East to Hengelo and West past Apeldoorn to Amsterdam. Main roads are the N348 (Arnhem to Zutphen, Deventer and Ommen), N314 (Zutphen to Doetinchem), N319 (Zutphen to Vorden and Winterswijk), N345 (Zutphen to Lochem and Hengelo), N826 (Zutphen to Almen and Laren).

=== Bus ===
Almost all buses in and around Zutphen are operated by Arriva. There are three internal city bus lines, and regional lines to Doetinchem, Deventer, Almen-Laren and Vorden. The bus lines towards Apeldoorn and Dieren were canceled in the past; these towns and the destinations in between can now only be reached by car or by train.

== Sister cities ==
Until 2018, Zutphen was twinned with:

Horstmar, Germany; Satu Mare, Romania; Shrewsbury, England	Tartu, Estonia; Villa Sandino, Nicaragua

Delegations including the mayors of the cities visited each other, and developmental aid programs were in place with Satu Mare, Tartu and Villa Sandino. However, Zutphen's authority decided in 2018 to sever official links with all of its sister cities as a cost cutting measure.

== Notable residents ==
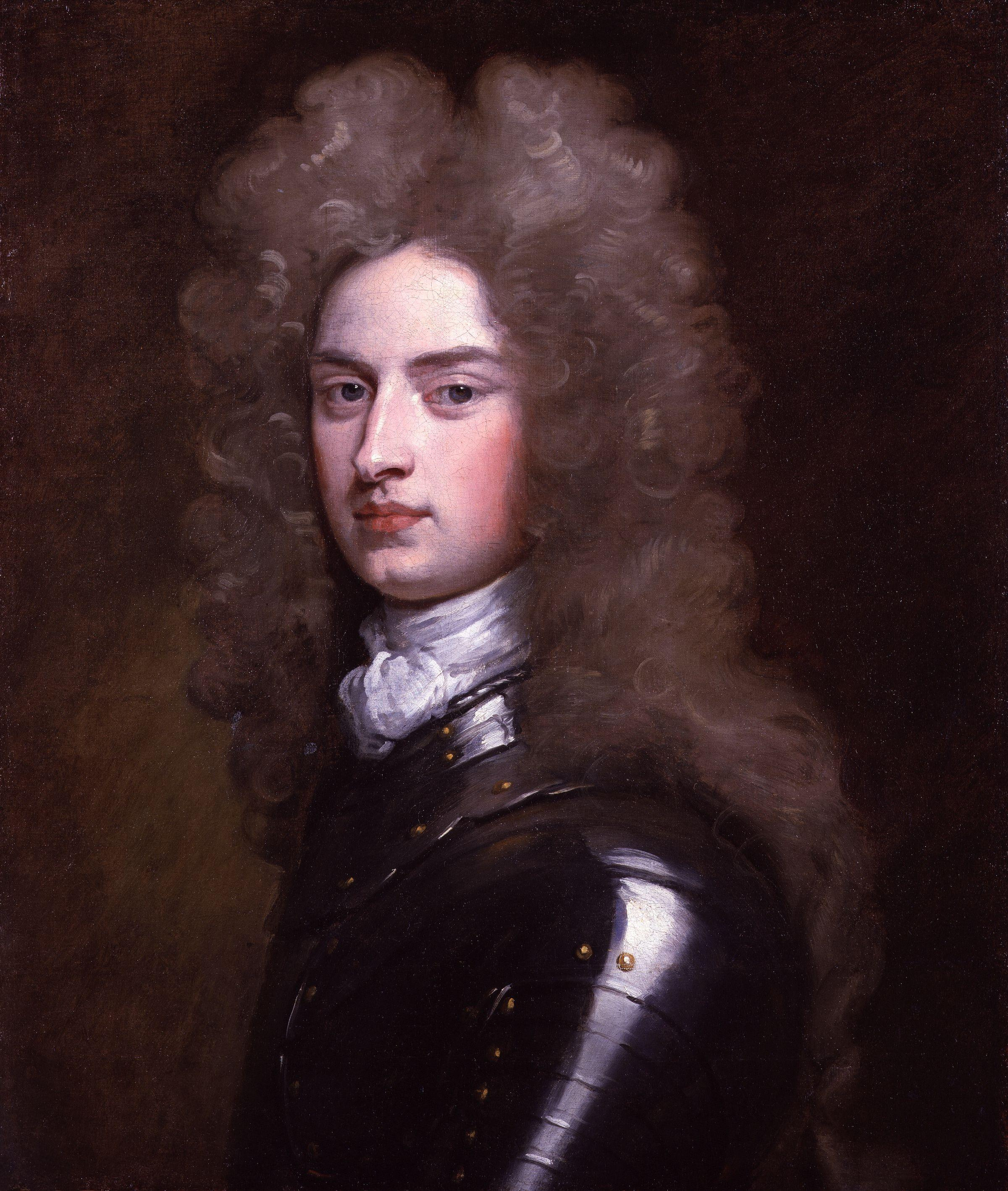
Arnold Joost van Keppel, 1st Earl of Albemarle, ca.1700

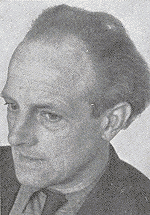
Joop Westerweel

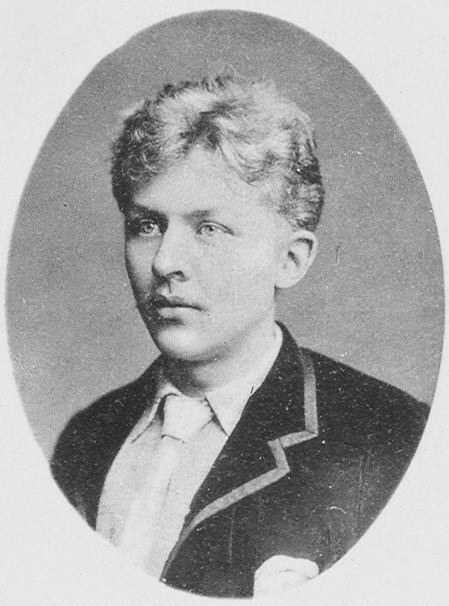
Jan Brandts Buys, 1893

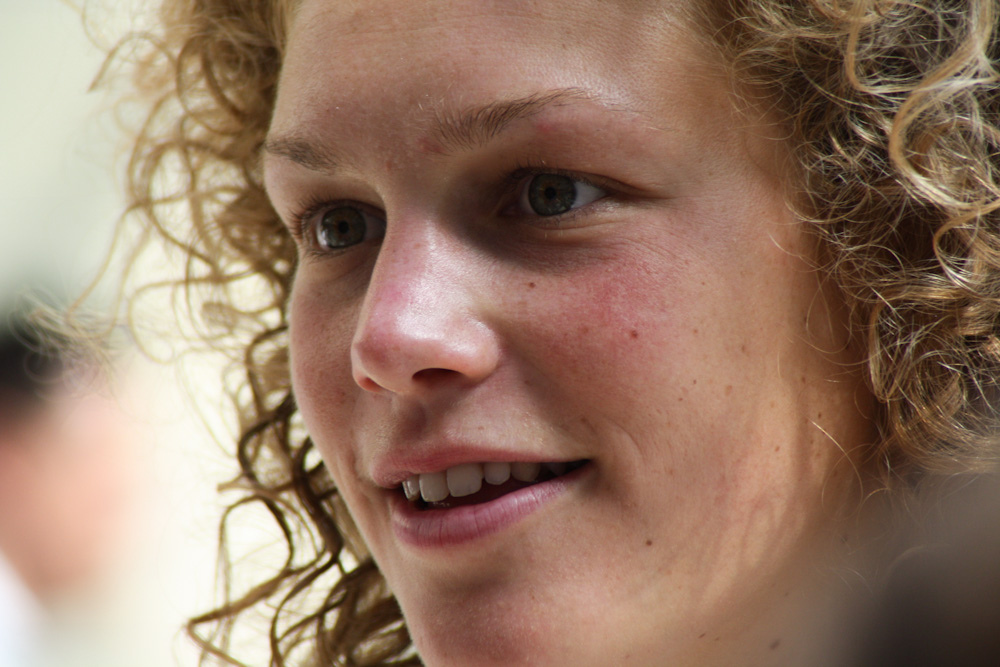
Mirte Roelvink, 2011

=== Public service ===
- Gerard Zerbolt of Zutphen (1367–1398) a mystical writer and early member of the Brethren of the Common Life
- Johannes Mensing (1477–1547) a German Dominican theologian and controversialist, an opponent of Martin Luther
- Pieter and François Hemony (c. 1609–1667 and 1619–1680) bell founders, who built the world's first tuned carillon, installed in Zutphen's Wijnhuistoren tower in 1644
- Arnold van Keppel, 1st Earl of Albemarle (1670–1718) right-hand man of William III of Orange.
- Judith van Dorth (1747 in Warnsveld – 1799) an orangist and aristocrat, executed for treason
- John Andrew Stedman (1778–1833) a general in the Dutch army during the Napoleonic Wars
- Jacob van Heeckeren tot Enghuizen (1792–1884) a Dutch diplomat
- Herman Hendrik Baanders (1849–1905) architect who was primarily active in Amsterdam
- Richard Constant Boer (1863 in Warnsveld – 1929) a Dutch linguist specializing in Old Norse
- Gijsbert Weijer Jan Bruins (1884–1948) executive director IMF 1946/48, Royal commissioner of the Netherlands Bank 1926–1946
- Hendrik Mulderije (1896–1970) politician, Minister of Justice
- Joop Westerweel (1899–1944) Dutch World War II resistance leader, the head of the Westerweel Group
- Robert van Gulik (1910–1967) an orientalist, diplomat, and writer
- Dr. Gerrit Kastein (1910–1943) a Dutch communist, neurologist and resistance fighter in WWII
- Jan Christiaan Lindeman (1921–2007) botanist
- Theo Hendriks (1928–2015), politician (House of Representatives)
- Mart Bax (born 1937) emeritus and professor in political anthropology at the Vrije Universiteit
- Henk Tennekes (1950–2020) toxicologist
- Paul de Krom (born 1963) politician, Minister in the First Rutte cabinet
- Kees Luesink (1953–2014) politician and Mayor of Doesburg
- Ap Dijksterhuis (born 1968) social psychologist at Radboud University Nijmegen

=== The arts ===
- Catharina van Rees (1831–1915) an author, editor and composer
- Stephanie Vetter (1848-1974) a Dutch novelist
- Jan Brandts Buys (1868–1933) a Dutch-Austrian classical composer
- Margo Scharten-Antink (1869–1957) a Dutch poet
- Mommie Schwarz (1876–1942 in Auschwitz) a Dutch Jewish painter and graphic artist
- Joseph Lefkowitz (1892-1983), British critic and translator
- Jo Spier (1900–1978) artist and illustrator
- Marlous Fluitsma (born 1946) a Dutch film and TV actress
- Ellen ten Damme (born 1967 in Warnsveld) a Dutch actress, singer-songwriter and multi-instrumentalist
- Mark van Eeuwen (born 1976 in Warnsveld) a Dutch actor
- Bas Kosters (born 1977) a Dutch fashion designer, known for his colourful designs

=== Sport ===
- Lambertus Doedes (1878–1955) a sailor, competed at the 1928 Summer Olympics
- Dolf van der Scheer (1909–1966) a speed skater, competed in the 1936 Winter Olympics
- Jos Alberts (born 1960) a cyclist
- Hans Keldermann (born 1966) a rower
- Mitchell van der Gaag (born 1971) a retired footballer with 431 club caps and a football manager
- Josephus Schenk (born 1980) a professional darts player
- Henri Schoeman (judoka) (born 1983) judoka
- Jan Werle (born 1984 in Warnsveld) a chess grandmaster and student civil lawyer
- Mirte Roelvink (born 1985) footballer in the Netherlands women's national football team
- Johnatan Opoku (born 1990) a footballer
- Auke van de Kamp (born 1995), a volleyballplayer (National Team)
- Marit Auée (born 2002), a footballer Brighton & Hove Albion WFC
- Anis Yadir (born 2004), a footballer

== Gallery ==
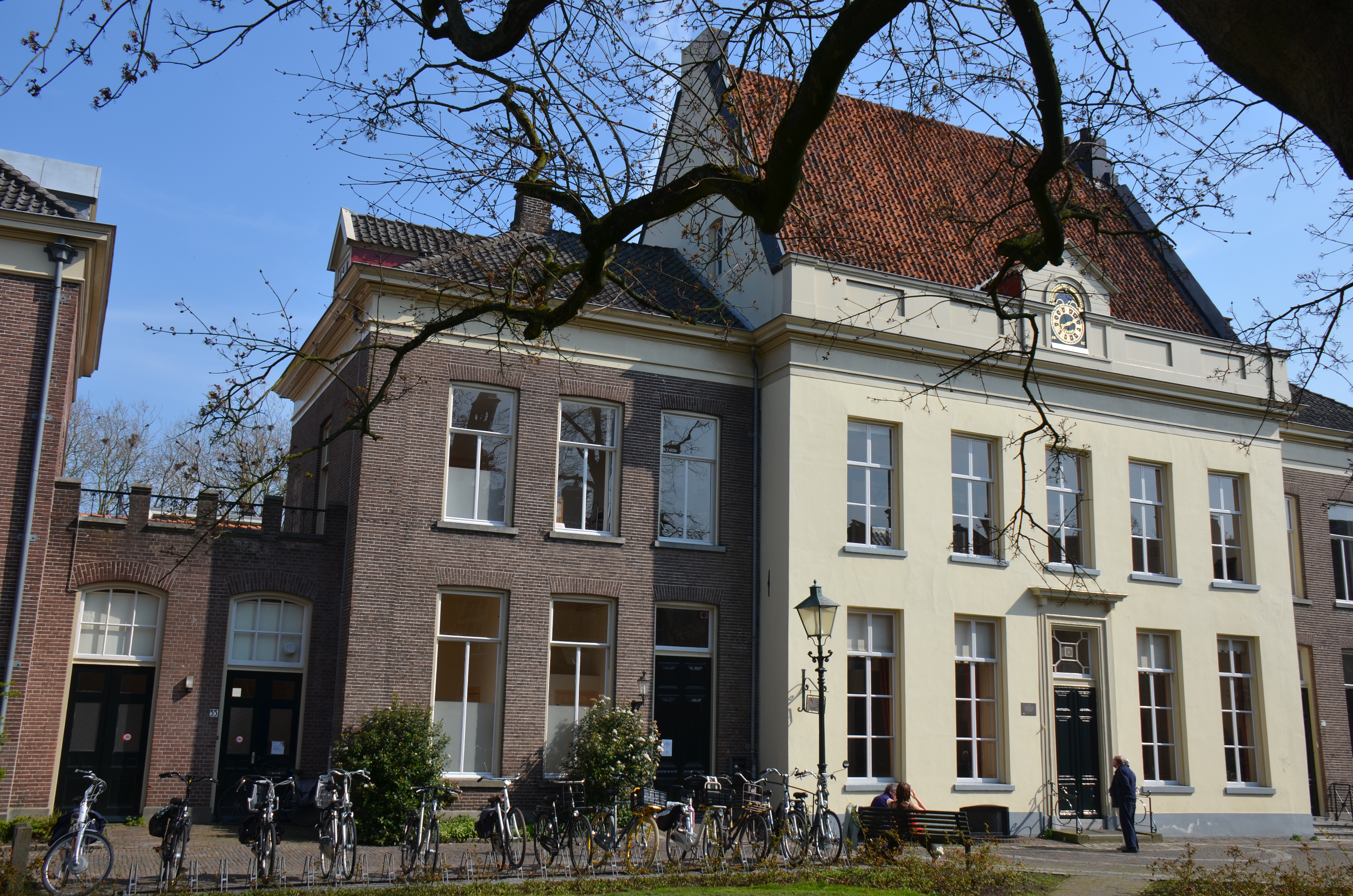
Clockbuilding at Zutphen in the courtgarden

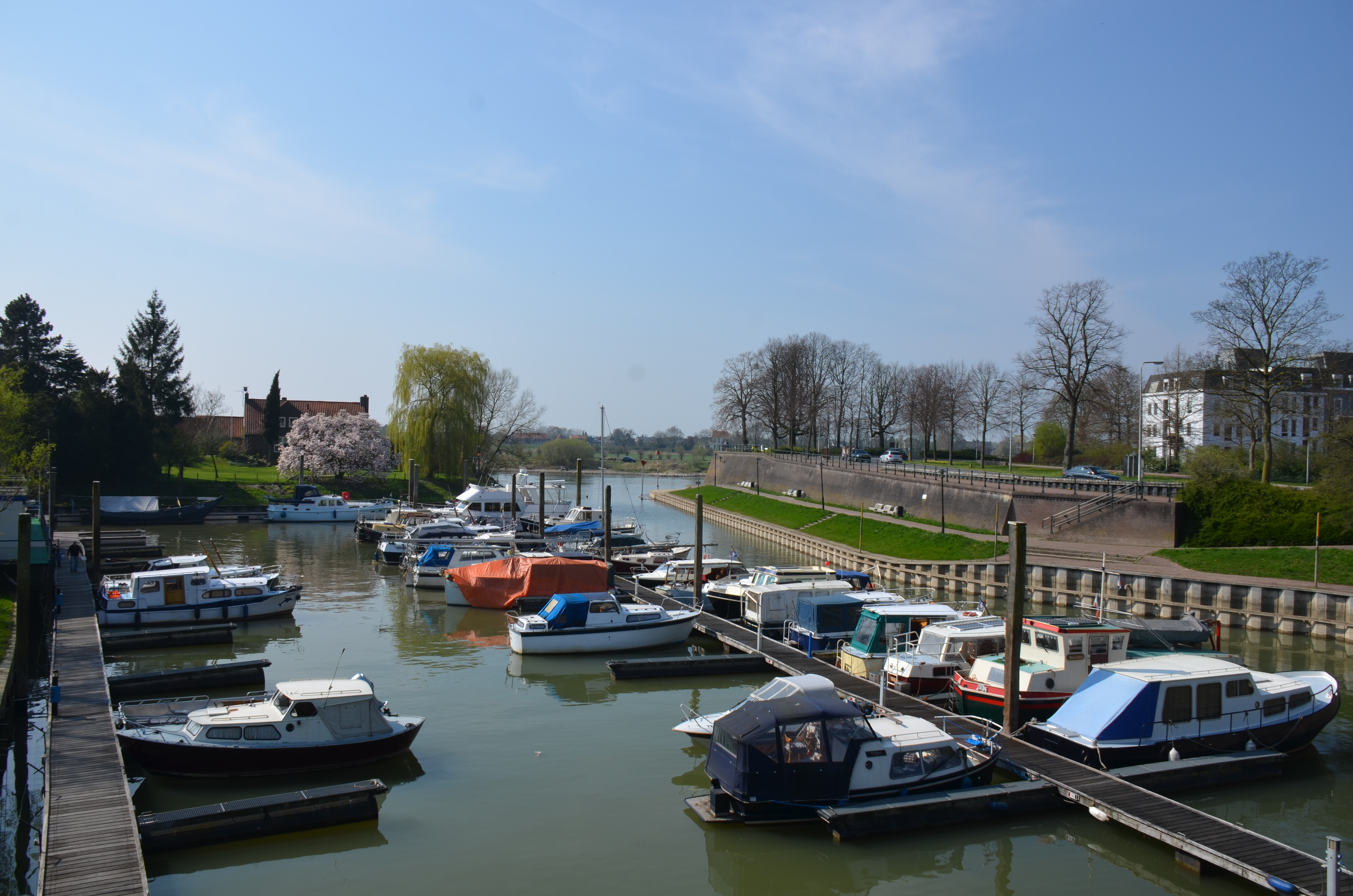
IJsselharbour of Zutphen

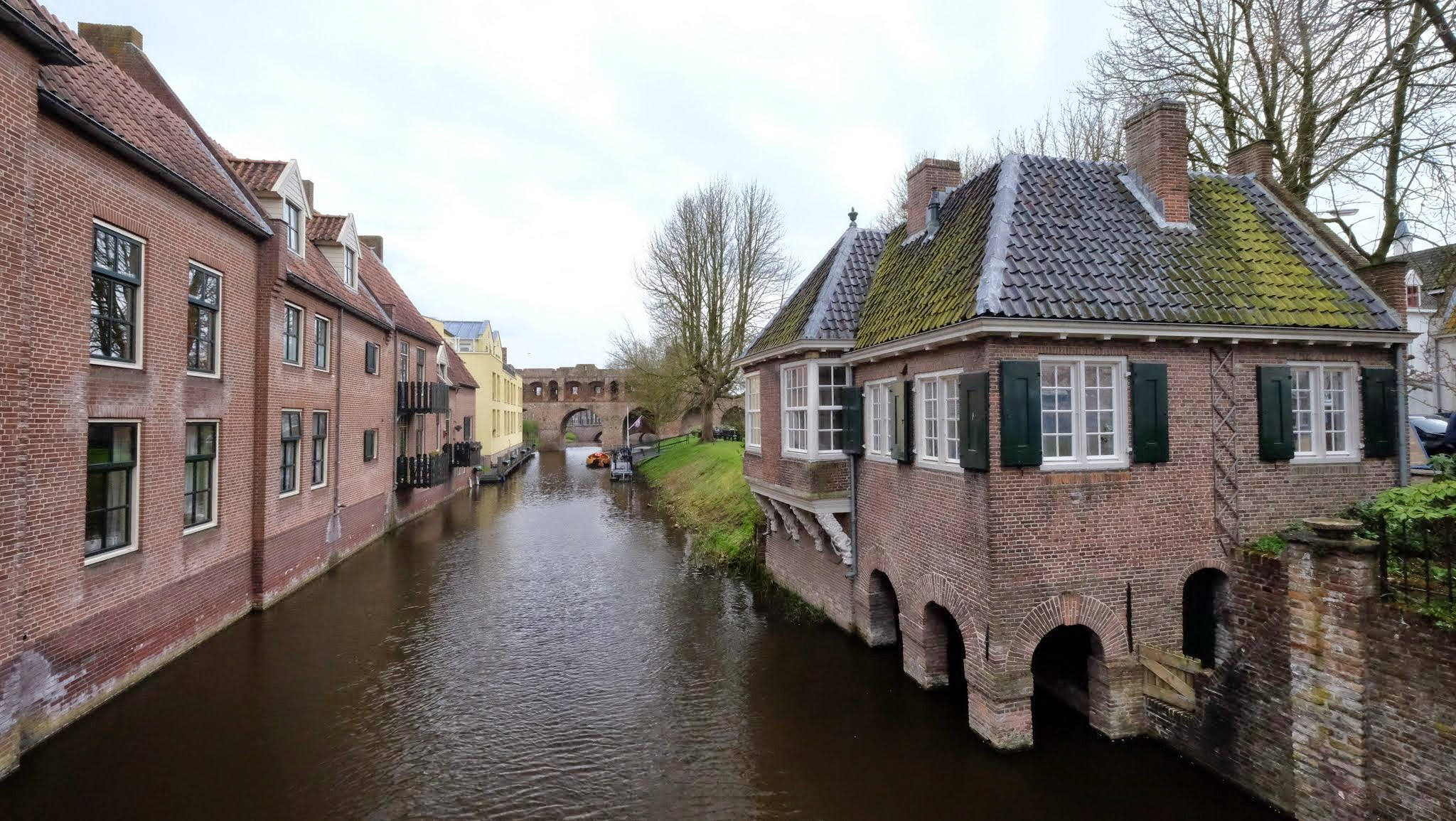
Zutphen

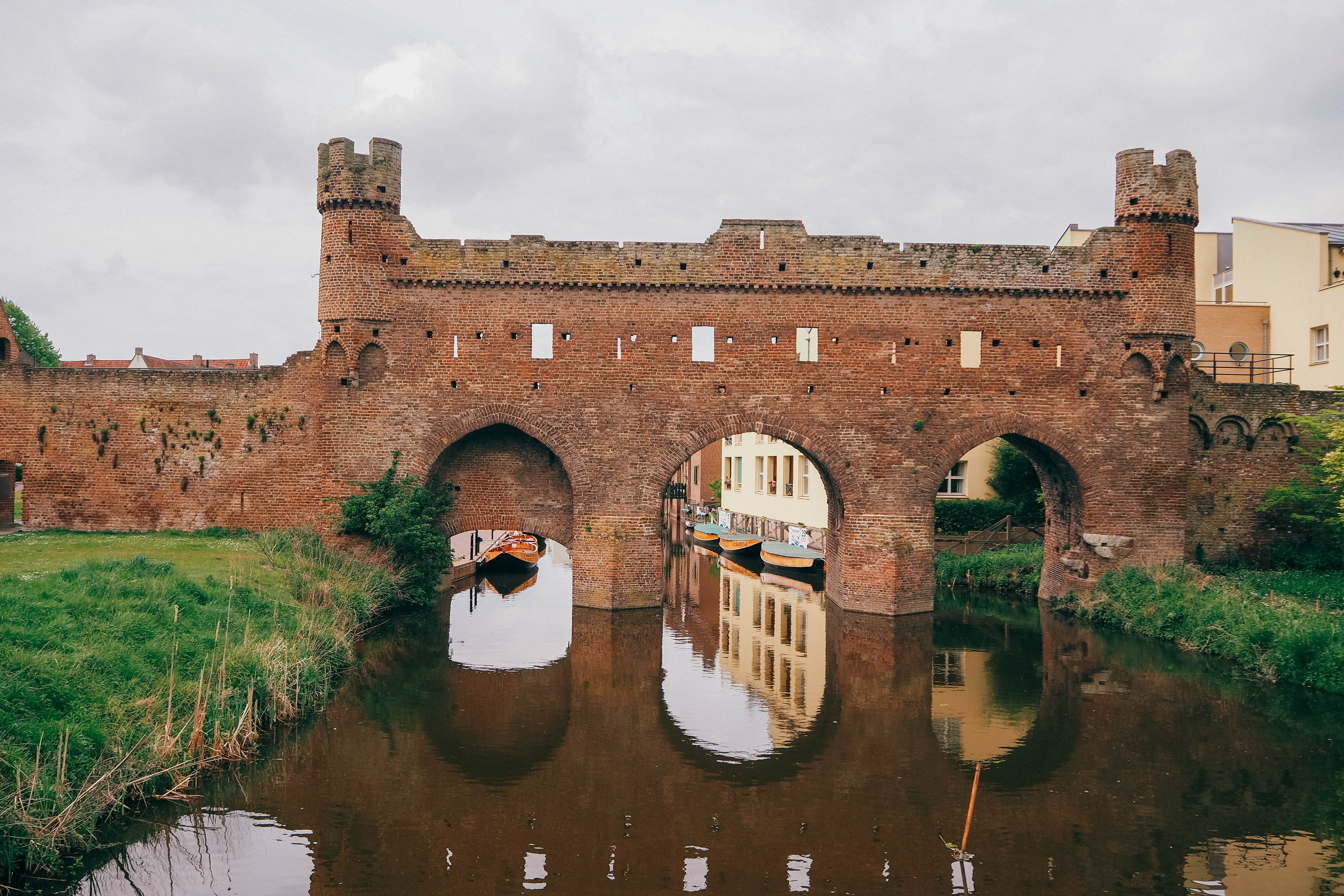
The Berkelpoort

== See also ==
- Zutphen (ship) – 17th century privateering vessel
