= Psalm 65 =

65th psalm

- "Praise waiteth for thee, O God, in Sion"
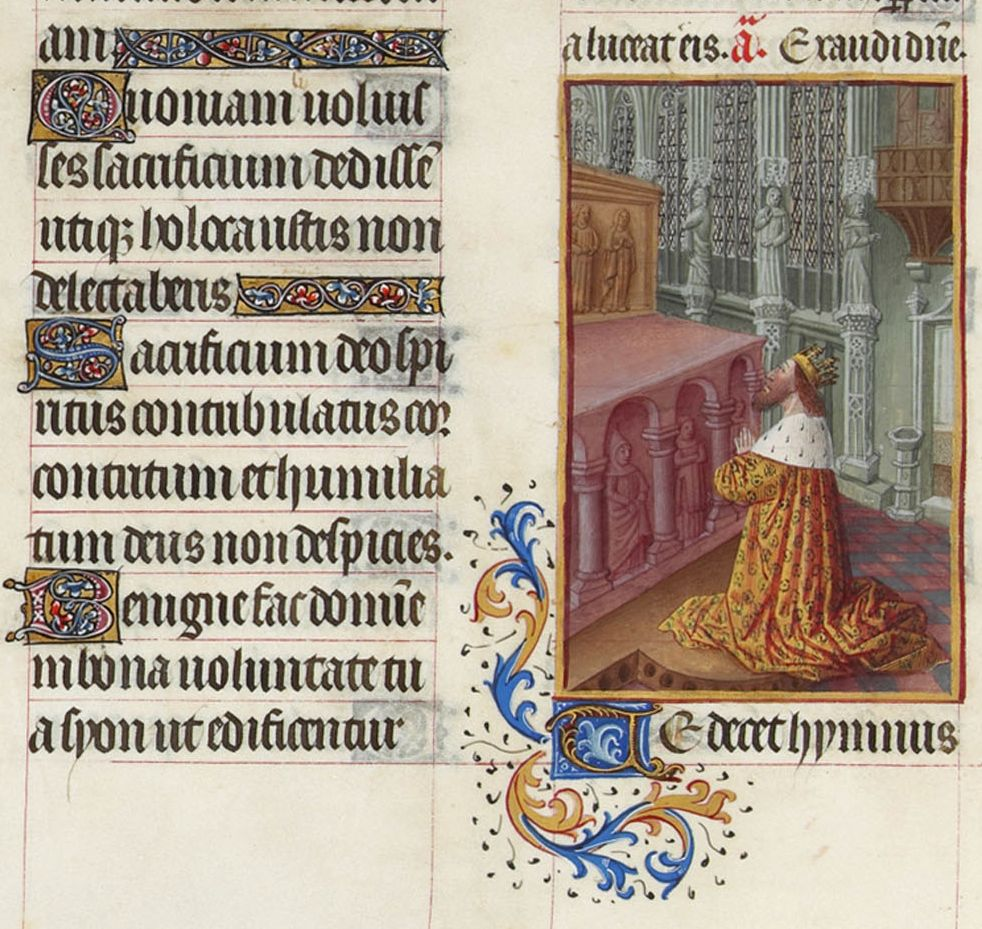
- Psalm 65 in Les Très Riches Heures du duc de Berry, Folio 101v - Psalm LXIV (Vulgate) the Musée Condé, Chantilly.
- Other name: Psalm 64; "Te decet hymnus Deus in Sion"
- Language: Hebrew (original)

Psalm 65
- ← Psalm 64 Psalm 66 →
- Book: Book of Psalms
- Hebrew Bible part: Ketuvim
- Order in the Hebrew part: 1
- Category: Sifrei Emet
- Christian Bible part: Old Testament
- Order in the Christian part: 19

Psalm 65 is the 65th psalm of the Book of Psalms, beginning in English in the King James Version: "Praise waiteth for thee, O God, in Sion: and unto thee shall the vow be performed". In the slightly different numbering system of the Greek Septuagint version of the Bible and the Latin Vulgate, this psalm is Psalm 64. In Latin, it is known as "Te decet hymnus Deus in Sion et tibi reddetur votum in Hierusalem".

The psalm forms a regular part of Jewish, Catholic, Lutheran, Anglican and other Protestant liturgies. It has been set to music.

== Background ==
Psalm 65 begins a group of four psalms which are hymns of thanksgiving, in contrast to preceding psalms which are laments. It begins in the style of a prayer, transitions to a description of God, and concludes with praise to God.

The Jerusalem Bible suggests it is set "after a good year with plentiful rain".

== Uses ==
=== Judaism ===
- This psalm is recited on Yom Kippur, and at Shmini Atzeret in some traditions.
- Verse 5 is recited by those present at a brit milah.

=== Book of Common Prayer ===
In the Church of England's Book of Common Prayer, this psalm is appointed to be read on the evening of the 12th day of the month.

== Music ==
Heinrich Schütz set Psalm 65 in a metred version in German, "Gott, man lobt dich in der Still", SWV 162, as part of the Becker Psalter, first published in 1628.

== Text ==
The following table shows the Hebrew text of the Psalm with vowels, alongside the Koine Greek text in the Septuagint and the English translation from the King James Version. Note that the meaning can slightly differ between these versions, as the Septuagint and the Masoretic Text come from different textual traditions. (Note: A 1917 translation directly from Hebrew to English by the Jewish Publication Society can be found here or here, and an 1844 translation directly from the Septuagint by L. C. L. Brenton can be found here. Both translations are in the public domain.) In the Septuagint, this psalm is numbered Psalm 64.

#	Hebrew	English	Greek
(Note: In the Jewish verse numbering, the ascription of this psalm is verse 1, and the rest of the psalm begins from verse 2. However, the Christian verse numbering does not count the ascription.)	לַמְנַצֵּ֥חַ מִזְמ֗וֹר לְדָוִ֥ד שִֽׁיר׃	(To the chief Musician, A Psalm and Song of David.)	Εἰς τὸ τέλος· ψαλμὸς τῷ Δαυΐδ, ᾠδή· ῾Ιερεμίου καὶ ᾿Ιεζεκιήλ ἐκ τοῦ λαοῦ τῆς παροικίας, ὅτε ἔμελλον ἐκπορεύεσθαι. -
1	לְךָ֤ דֻֽמִיָּ֬ה תְהִלָּ֓ה אֱלֹ֘הִ֥ים בְּצִיּ֑וֹן וּ֝לְךָ֗ יְשֻׁלַּם־נֶֽדֶר׃	Praise waiteth for thee, O God, in Sion: and unto thee shall the vow be performed.	ΣΟΙ ΠΡΕΠΕΙ ὕμνος, ὁ Θεός, ἐν Σιών, καὶ σοὶ ἀποδοθήσεται εὐχὴ ἐν ῾Ιερουσαλήμ.
2	שֹׁמֵ֥עַ תְּפִלָּ֑ה עָ֝דֶ֗יךָ כׇּל־בָּשָׂ֥ר יָבֹֽאוּ׃	O thou that hearest prayer, unto thee shall all flesh come.	εἰσάκουσον προσευχῆς μου· πρὸς σὲ πᾶσα σὰρξ ἥξει.
3	דִּבְרֵ֣י עֲ֭וֺנֹת גָּ֣בְרוּ מֶ֑נִּי פְּ֝שָׁעֵ֗ינוּ אַתָּ֥ה תְכַפְּרֵֽם׃	Iniquities prevail against me: as for our transgressions, thou shalt purge them away.	λόγοι ἀνόμων ὑπερεδυνάμωσαν ἡμᾶς, καὶ ταῖς ἀσεβείαις ἡμῶν σὺ ἱλάσῃ.
4	אַשְׁרֵ֤י ׀ תִּ֥בְחַ֣ר וּתְקָרֵב֮ יִשְׁכֹּ֢ן חֲצֵ֫רֶ֥יךָ נִ֭שְׂבְּעָה בְּט֣וּב בֵּיתֶ֑ךָ קְ֝דֹ֗שׁ הֵיכָלֶֽךָ׃	Blessed is the man whom thou choosest, and causest to approach unto thee, that he may dwell in thy courts: we shall be satisfied with the goodness of thy house, even of thy holy temple.	μακάριος ὃν ἐξελέξω καὶ προσελάβου· κατασκηνώσει ἐν ταῖς αὐλαῖς σου. πλησθησόμεθα ἐν τοῖς ἀγαθοῖς τοῦ οἴκου σου· ἅγιος ὁ ναός σου,
5	נ֤וֹרָא֨וֹת ׀ בְּצֶ֣דֶק תַּ֭עֲנֵנוּ אֱלֹהֵ֣י יִשְׁעֵ֑נוּ מִבְטָ֥ח כׇּל־קַצְוֵי־אֶ֝֗רֶץ וְיָ֣ם רְחֹקִֽים׃	By terrible things in righteousness wilt thou answer us, O God of our salvation; who art the confidence of all the ends of the earth, and of them that are afar off upon the sea:	θαυμαστὸς ἐν δικαιοσύνῃ. ἐπάκουσον ἡμῶν, ὁ Θεός, ὁ σωτὴρ ἡμῶν, ἡ ἐλπὶς πάντων τῶν περάτων τῆς γῆς καὶ τῶν ἐν θαλάσσῃ μακράν,
6	מֵכִ֣ין הָרִ֣ים בְּכֹח֑וֹ נֶ֝אְזָ֗ר בִּגְבוּרָֽה׃	Which by his strength setteth fast the mountains; being girded with power:	ἑτοιμάζων ὄρη ἐν τῇ ἰσχύϊ αὐτοῦ, περιεζωσμένος ἐν δυναστείᾳ,
7	מַשְׁבִּ֤יחַ ׀ שְׁא֣וֹן יַ֭מִּים שְׁא֥וֹן גַּלֵּיהֶ֗ם וַהֲמ֥וֹן לְאֻמִּֽים׃	Which stilleth the noise of the seas, the noise of their waves, and the tumult of the people.	ὁ συνταράσσων τὸ κῦτος τῆς θαλάσσης, ἤχους κυμάτων αὐτῆς. ταραχθήσονται τὰ ἔθνη,
8	וַיִּ֤ירְא֨וּ ׀ יֹשְׁבֵ֣י קְ֭צָוֺת מֵאוֹתֹתֶ֑יךָ מ֤וֹצָֽאֵי בֹ֖קֶר וָעֶ֣רֶב תַּרְנִֽין׃	They also that dwell in the uttermost parts are afraid at thy tokens: thou makest the outgoings of the morning and evening to rejoice.	καὶ φοβηθήσονται οἱ κατοικοῦντες τὰ πέρατα ἀπὸ τῶν σημείων σου· ἐξόδους πρωΐας καὶ ἑσπέρας τέρψεις.
9	פָּ֤קַֽדְתָּ הָאָ֨רֶץ וַתְּשֹׁ֪קְקֶ֡הָ רַבַּ֬ת תַּעְשְׁרֶ֗נָּה פֶּ֣לֶג אֱ֭לֹהִים מָ֣לֵא מָ֑יִם תָּכִ֥ין דְּ֝גָנָ֗ם כִּי־כֵ֥ן תְּכִינֶֽהָ׃	Thou visitest the earth, and waterest it: thou greatly enrichest it with the river of God, which is full of water: thou preparest them corn, when thou hast so provided for it.	ἐπεσκέψω τὴν γῆν καὶ ἐμέθυσας αὐτήν, ἐπλήθυνας τοῦ πλουτίσαι αὐτήν· ὁ ποταμὸς τοῦ Θεοῦ ἐπληρώθη ὑδάτων· ἡτοίμασας τὴν τροφὴν αὐτῶν, ὅτι οὕτως ἡ ἑτοιμασία.
10	תְּלָמֶ֣יהָ רַ֭וֵּה נַחֵ֣ת גְּדוּדֶ֑הָ בִּרְבִיבִ֥ים תְּ֝מֹגְגֶ֗נָּה צִמְחָ֥הּ תְּבָרֵֽךְ׃	Thou waterest the ridges thereof abundantly: thou settlest the furrows thereof: thou makest it soft with showers: thou blessest the springing thereof.	τοὺς αὔλακας αὐτῆς μέθυσον, πλήθυνον τὰ γεννήματα αὐτῆς, ἐν ταῖς σταγόσιν αὐτῆς εὐφρανθήσεται ἀνατέλλουσα.
11	עִ֭טַּרְתָּ שְׁנַ֣ת טוֹבָתֶ֑ךָ וּ֝מַעְגָּלֶ֗יךָ יִרְעֲפ֥וּן דָּֽשֶׁן׃	Thou crownest the year with thy goodness; and thy paths drop fatness.	εὐλογήσεις τὸν στέφανον τοῦ ἐνιαυτοῦ τῆς χρηστότητός σου, καὶ τὰ πεδία σου πλησθήσονται πιότητος·
12	יִ֭רְעֲפוּ נְא֣וֹת מִדְבָּ֑ר וְ֝גִ֗יל גְּבָע֥וֹת תַּחְגֹּֽרְנָה׃	They drop upon the pastures of the wilderness: and the little hills rejoice on every side.	πιανθήσεται τὰ ὄρη τῆς ἐρήμου, καὶ ἀγαλλίασιν οἱ βουνοὶ περιζώσονται.
13	לָבְשׁ֬וּ כָרִ֨ים ׀ הַצֹּ֗אן וַעֲמָקִ֥ים יַֽעַטְפוּ־בָ֑ר יִ֝תְרוֹעֲע֗וּ אַף־יָשִֽׁירוּ׃	The pastures are clothed with flocks; the valleys also are covered over with corn; they shout for joy, they also sing.	ἐνεδύσαντο οἱ κριοὶ τῶν προβάτων, καὶ αἱ κοιλάδες πληθυνοῦσι σῖτον· κεκράξονται, καὶ γὰρ ὑμνήσουσι.

== Verse 1 ==
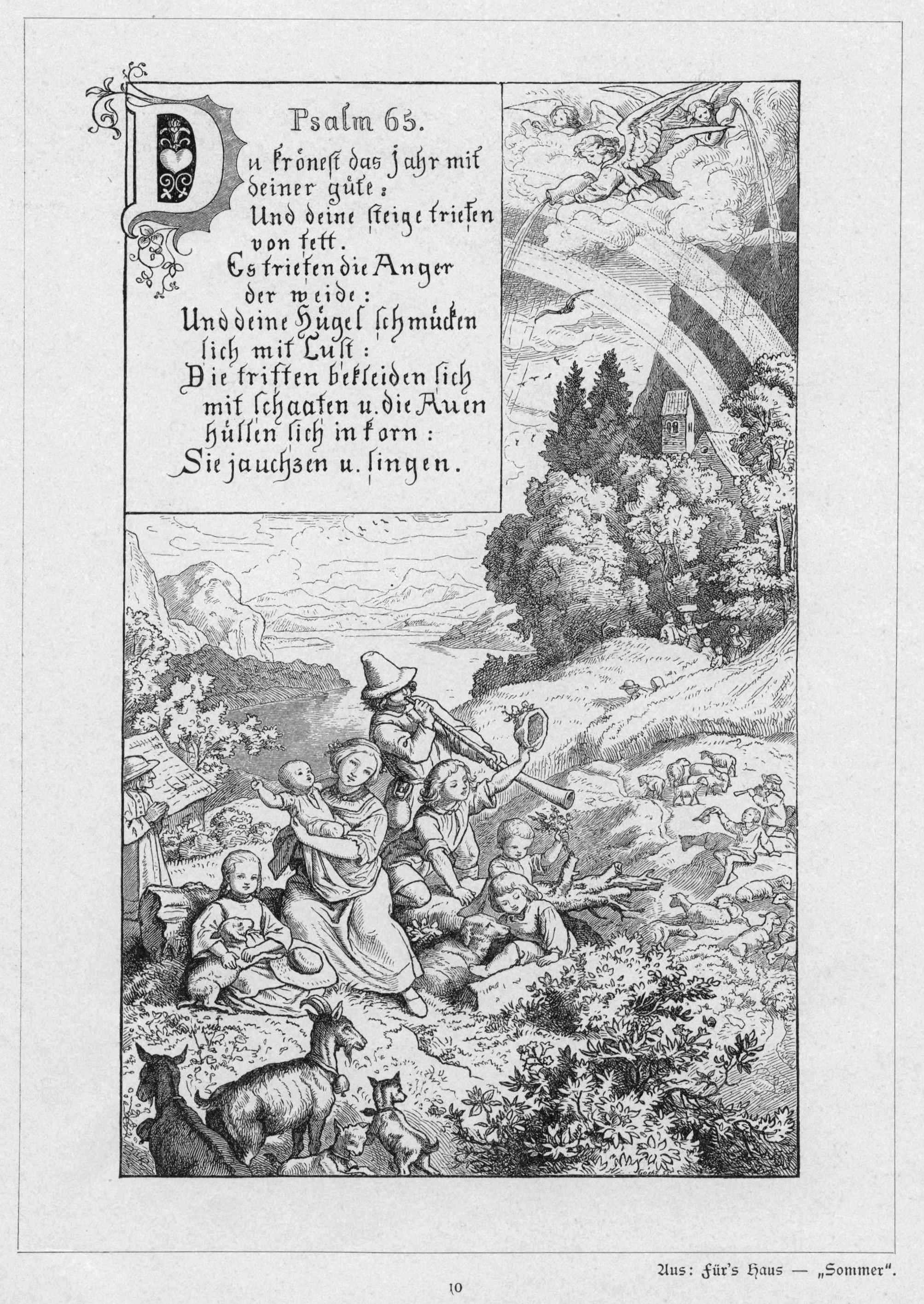
Psalm 65, by Adrian Ludwig Richter (1803–1884). In: Für's Haus – "Sommer" (between 1858 and 1861)

Praise is awaiting You, O God, in Zion;
And to You the vow shall be performed.

Some versions make reference to silence in this verse, for example the New American Standard Bible:

There will be silence before You, and praise in Zion, God,
And the vow will be fulfilled for You.
