= Eastman =

Eastman may refer to:

== People ==
- Eastman (surname)
- Eastman Nixon Jacobs (1902–1987), American aerodynamicist
- John Eastman (b 1960), American lawyer and founding director of the Center for Constitutional Jurisprudence, author of Eastman memos while he was retained by then-President Donald Trump
- Jonathan Eastman Johnson (1824–1906), American painter
- George Eastman (1854-1932), American entrepreneur who founded the Eastman Kodak Company
- Lester Fuess Eastman (1928-2013), American physicist, engineer and educator.

== Places ==
=== Canada ===
- Eastman Region, Manitoba
- Eastman, Quebec, a municipality

=== United States ===
- Eastman, Georgia, a city
- Eastman, New Hampshire, an unincorporated community
- Eastman, Wisconsin, a village
- Eastman (town), Wisconsin
- Eastman Pond, New Hampshire

=== Elsewhere ===
- Eastman (crater), on Mercury

== Other ==
- Eastman School of Music
  - Eastman Theatre
  - Eastman Wind Ensemble
- Eastman Color Negative
- Eastman Chemical Company
- Eastman Dental Hospital
  - UCL Eastman Dental Institute
- Eastman Gang, last of New York's street gangs which dominated the city's underworld during the late 1890s until the early 1910s
- Eastmaninstitutet, a dental care centre in Stockholm, Sweden, founded by donations from George Eastman
- Eastman Kodak
- Edinburgh and Stirling Metropolitan Area Network

== See also ==
- Osterman
