= Eastman (surname) =

Eastman is a surname. Notable people with the surname include:

- A. Theodore Eastman, American bishop
- Allan Eastman (1912–1987), Australian diplomat
- Annis Bertha Ford Eastman (1852–1910), American Congregationalist minister
- Ben C. Eastman (1812–1856), American politician, U.S. representative from Wisconsin (1851–1855)
- Benjamin Franklin Eastman (1800–1894), American politician in Maine
- Carole Eastman (1934–2004), American screenwriter
- Charles Eastman (1858–1939), Native American physician, writer, national lecturer and reformer
- Charles R. Eastman (1868–1918), American palaeontologist
- Charles S. Eastman (1864–1939) American lawyer and politician
- Creswell Eastman (1940–2025) Australian endocrinologist, studied iodine deficiency
- Crystal Eastman (1881–1928) American lawyer, feminist, socialist and journalist
- David Eastman (disambiguation)
  - David Eastman (wrongful conviction) (1933–1989)
  - David Eastman (politician)
  - David Eastman (British Army officer) (born 1970)
- Edward Eastman, American politician
- Enos Eastman (1821–1908), American politician from Wisconsin
- George Eastman (1854–1932), American inventor and philanthropist, founder of Kodak
- George Eastman (actor) (1942–2026), Italian actor and screenwriter
- George Eastman (cricketer) (1903–1991), English cricketer
- H. E. Eastman (1819–1898), American politician, mayor of Green Bay, Wisconsin
- Howard Eastman (b. 1970), middleweight boxer
- Irene Eastman (1894–1918), American singer, daughter of Charles Eastman
- John A. Eastman (1821–1895), Wisconsin politician
- John C. Eastman (b. 1960), American lawyer, law professor and politician
- Joseph Bartlett Eastman (1882–1944), American government official
- Julius Eastman (1940–1990), African-American composer, pianist, vocalist and dancer
- Kevin Eastman (b. 1962), co-creator of the Teenage Mutant Ninja Turtles series
- Kevin Eastman (basketball) (born 1955), American player and coach
- La Fayette Eastman (1819–1898), American politician from Wisconsin
- Lee Eastman (1910–1991), American attorney and art collector
- Leroy D. Eastman (1872–1945), American politician
- Linda McCartney née Eastman (1941–1998), American photographer, wife of Paul McCartney
- Linda Eastman (1867–1963), American librarian
- Marilyn Eastman (1933–2021), American actress
- Marvin Eastman (b. 1971), American mixed martial artist and kickboxer
- Mary Eastman (singer), American singer
- Mary F. Eastman (1833–1908), American educator, lecturer, writer, suffragist
- Mary H. Eastman née Henderson (1818–1887), American writer on Native American life
- Max Eastman (1883–1969), American writer, poet and political activist
- Monk Eastman (1875–1920), New York gangster
- P. D. Eastman (1909–1986), cartoonist and author of children's books
- Peter Eastman (disambiguation)
- Rebecca Lane Hooper Eastman (1877–1937), American writer
- Rodney Eastman (b. 1967), Canadian actor
- Seth Eastman (1808–1875), US Army officer, mapmaker and illustrator; husband of Mary H.
- W. Dean Eastman (b. 1948), American educator
