= Senator Eastman =

Senator Eastman may refer to:

- Dan Eastman (1948–2010), Utah State Senate
- Enoch W. Eastman (1810–1885), Iowa State Senate
- Enos Eastman (1821–1908), Wisconsin State Senate
- H. E. Eastman (1819–1898), Wisconsin State Senate
- John A. Eastman (1821–1895), Wisconsin State Senate
- Nehemiah Eastman (1782–1856), New Hampshire State Senate
