= CGR =

CGR may refer to:

- Campo Grande International Airport (IATA airport code)
- Canadian Government Railways
- Cape Government Railways
- Center for Governmental Research
- Ceylon Government Railway
- Chip Ganassi Racing
  - Chip Ganassi Racing (NASCAR)
- Classic Game Room
- Commercial gramophone record – see Spelling of disc
- Condensate to Gas Ratio
- Contraloría General de la República de Costa Rica
- Cyprus Government Railway
- Compound growth rate, a non-annual version of the more commonly used Compound annual growth rate
