= Thomas Stephens (Wisconsin pioneer) =

American Civil War officer

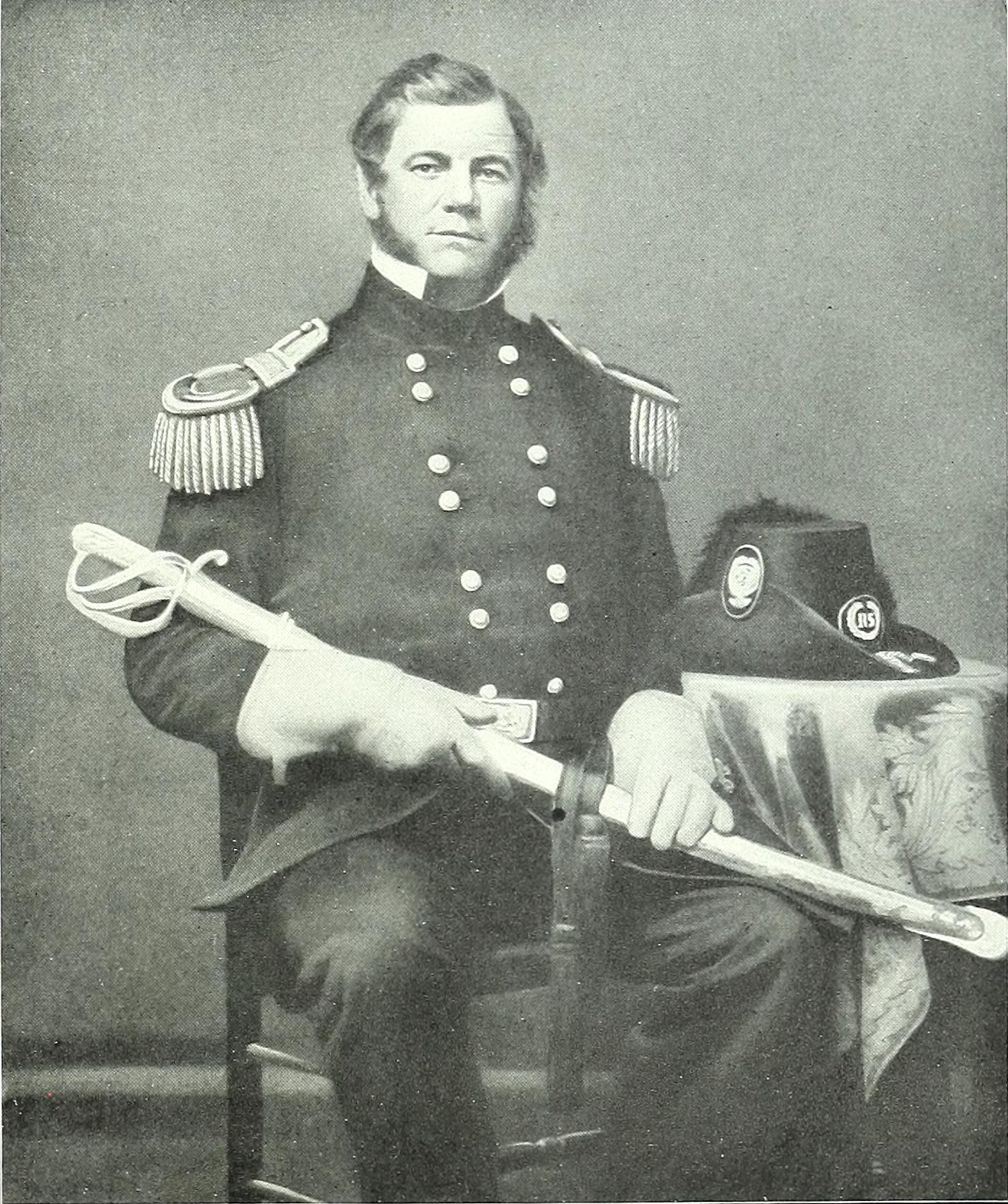
- From Commemorative Biographical Record of the Counties of Rock, Green, Grant, Iowa and Lafayette, Wisconsin (1901)
- Born: May 13, 1815; Tavistock, Devonshire, UK
- Died: July 22, 1871 (aged 56) Dodgeville, Wisconsin, U.S.
- Buried: East Side Cemetery, Dodgeville, Wisconsin
- Allegiance: United Kingdom; United States
- Branch: British Army; Wisconsin Militia; United States Volunteers; Union Army
- Rank: Brig. General, WNG; Colonel, USV
- Commands: 2nd Reg. Wis. Vol. Cavalry
- Conflicts: American Civil War
- Spouse: Jane W. Hagerman (m. 1847–1871)
- Children: Eme I. Stephens^{(b. 1848; died 1849)}; Mary R. Stephens^{(b. 1850; died 1851)}; Harriet Jane (Osborne)^{(b. 1854; died 1938)}; Thomas Charles Stephens^{(b. 1857)}; Elizabeth Jane "Libbie" (Carson)^{(b. 1859; died 1941)}

Thomas Stephens (May 13, 1815 – July 22, 1871) was an English American immigrant, miner, and Wisconsin pioneer. As a young man he served in the Queen's Life Guard during the reign of Queen Victoria, and after emigrating to the United States, he served as a Union Army cavalry officer in the American Civil War. He was a celebrated swordsman and fencer, and wrote a treatise on swordsmanship which was part of the recommended curriculum for United States Army officers in the Civil War era. During his lifetime, his last name was often spelled Stevens.

== Biography ==
Thomas Stephens was born in Tavistock, Devonshire, in the United Kingdom. As a young man he went to work as a miner, but entered military service in the British Army and was recognized for his intellect and unique physical stature. As a result, he was admitted to the elite Queen's Life Guard. In this elite corps of the Household Division, he was instructed in fencing, horsemanship, and other self defense.

Before completing his full term of service, he sought a replacement and excused himself, finding the Guard's work monotonous and idle. He sought new opportunities in the United States, and in 1840, he set sail for America with his younger brother, Richard. They initially settled in Pottsville, Pennsylvania, to find work in mining. However, his skill as a swordsman soon became widely known in the area, and he was called to give demonstrations and performances. After this notoriety, he moved to Philadelphia, where he gave fencing lessons and held exhibition matches against other famous American swordsmen of his era.

In 1845 he returned to his interests in the mining industry and went west via Galena, Illinois, where his parents and siblings had settled. He visited the mining region of Wisconsin and was then employed as an agent of the North American Copper Mine near Lake Superior. In 1847, he moved to Dodgeville, Wisconsin, which would be his primary residence for the rest of his life. In Dodgeville, he was principally involved in dealing real estate and mortgages.

He resumed military duties in 1857 when he accepted appointment as inspector general of the Wisconsin Militia. In the months leading up to the 1860 United States presidential election, Stephens became active in a local chapter of the Wide Awakes.

== Civil War service ==
At the outbreak of the American Civil War in 1861, he worked with Cadwallader C. Washburn to raise volunteers for a cavalry regiment. Their regiment became the 2nd Wisconsin Cavalry Regiment, with Washburn as colonel and Stephens as lieutenant colonel. Around the same time, he wrote an update to his 1844 essay on swordsmanship, A New System of Broad and Small Sword Exercise, which was praised by the Union Army's commanding general Winfield Scott, and recommended for study by officers entering the United States Army.

The 2nd Wisconsin Cavalry mustered into federal service in March 1862, and was sent to St. Louis, Missouri, for service in the western theater of the war. Shortly after arriving in the field, Stephens was detached from the regiment and placed in command of a camp of instruction at Springfield, Missouri, for drilling and training recruits. Stephens returned to the regiment in the Fall of 1862 when he was promoted to colonel to replace Washburn, who had been promoted to brigadier general.

The regiment participated in the early phases of Grant's Vicksburg campaign at the end of 1862, but in early 1863, they were transferred to Memphis, where Stephens was elevated to chief of cavalry, commanding the 3rd brigade.

During their time at Memphis, Stephens became the subject of a vicious rumor—that he had engaged in looting of property from homes in Confederate territory. The rumors were apparently started by journalist Marcus M. Pomeroy, who Stephens had ordered removed from the Union camp. Pomeroy had initially supported the Union cause but had become a vocal Copperhead; he made his accusations against Stephens in the La Crosse Democrat, a newspaper he ran in Wisconsin. Despite Washburn and others advising him to ignore the allegations, Stephens demanded an investigation, which ultimately vindicated him. Washburn and several others also wrote letters endorsing Stephens' character and performance. S

In June 1863, the regiment was ordered to return to the Vicksburg area, where they were engaged as scouts until the capture of Vicksburg on July 4. They were subsequently assigned to join Sherman's advance toward Jackson, Mississippi, where they engaged in a severe skirmish before being ordered to fall back. They were active for the next year in central Mississippi, destroying Confederate infrastructure and seizing equipment. In the Fall of 1863, Stephens was ordered to return to Wisconsin to assist in recruiting new volunteers, he remained there until March 1864, when he returned to the regiment camped near Vicksburg. Stephens drilled the new recruits in Mississippi while the re-enlisted veterans of the regiment were granted a furlough to return to Wisconsin.

In May 1864, the veterans returned and Stephens was placed in command of all the cavalry stationed in the Vicksburg area. Stephens fell ill in the Summer of 1864 and returned to Wisconsin again, returning to Mississippi in August 1864. In November 1864, Stephens and his subordinate, Major George N. Richmond, were ordered removed from their posts by General Napoleon J.T. Dana. Dana subsequently rescinded the order to remove Stephens and instead had him court-martialed. The accusations against Stephens this time were apparently incited by H. E. Eastman, who had recently been dismissed from the regiment. Further information on the court martial cannot be found, but Stephens did continue to serve as colonel of the 2nd Wisconsin Cavalry through the end of the war.

== Postbellum years ==
His health never recovered from his years of military service. In 1869, he took an extended vacation to his native England, hoping for recovery. He was received with honor at Windsor Castle, Buckingham Palace, and at Westminster. The trip did not provide any benefit to his health, however. He died shortly after returning to his home in Dodgeville, on July 22, 1871.

== Personal life and family ==
Thomas Stephens was the eldest of four sons born to Charles and Elizabeth Stephens. His parents followed him to America about two years after his emigration, along with his other siblings. His brother Richard Stephens also served in the Union Army during the Civil War.

Thomas Stephens married Jane W. Hagerman, of Williamsport, Pennsylvania, on August 5, 1847. They had at least five children together, though two died in infancy.

== Published works ==
Stephens, Thomas (1844). A New System of Broad and Small Sword Exercise and Horsemanship. Philadelphia.

Military offices
Preceded by Col. Cadwallader C. Washburn	Command of the 2nd Wisconsin Cavalry Regiment; August 1, 1862 – July 3, 1865	Succeeded by Lt. Col. Nicholas H. Dale
