= Osterman =

Osterman is a surname. Notable people with the surname include:

Russian

- Andrei Osterman (1686–1747), Russian statesman
- Ivan Osterman (1725-1811), Russian statesman

American

- Cat Osterman (b. 1983), American softball player
- Harry Osterman, Chicago politician
- Kathryn Osterman (1883-1956), American actress
- Lynne Osterman (b. 1962), American politician from Minnesota
- J.P. Osterman, American writer of science fiction

Slovene

- Ana Osterman (born 1940), Slovene politician

Swedish

- Oscar Osterman (1894–1956), Swedish Army officer

== Fictional characters ==
- Jon Osterman, a character in the Watchmen series, known more commonly as Doctor Manhattan

== See also ==
- The Osterman Weekend, a novel
- The Osterman Weekend (film)
- Ostermann
- Eastman (surname)
