= Samuel Eastman =

19th century American politician

Member of the Maine Senate from the Somerset County district
- In office January 5, 1831 – January 4, 1832
- Preceded by: Ebenezer L. Phelps
- Succeeded by: District abolished

Member of the Maine House of Representatives from the Somerset County district
- In office January 3, 1827 – January 2, 1828 Serving with 10 others

Personal details
- Born: October 27, 1784 Mount Vernon, District of Maine, Massachusetts, U.S.
- Died: January 20, 1864 (aged 79) Strong, Maine, U.S.
- Resting place: Strong Village Cemetery, Strong, Maine
- Spouse: Jane Hitchcock (m. 1807–1864)
- Children: William Henry Eastman^{(b. 1808; died 1887)}; Hiram Eastman^{(b. 1809; died 1809)}; Samuel Eastman Jr.^{(b. 1810; died 1832)}; Benjamin Clay Eastman^{(b. 1812; died 1856)}; Julia A. (Stubbs)^{(b. 1815; died 1887)}; Ezekiel Porter Eastman^{(b. 1817; died 1860)}; Harry Eugene Eastman^{(b. 1819; died 1898)}; John Albert Eastman^{(b. 1821; died 1885)}; Mary Jane (Hitchcock)^{(b. 1822; died 1848)}; George W. Eastman^{(b. 1824; died 1900)}; Frances A. Eastman^{(b. 1826; died 1845)}; Henry Clay Eastman^{(b. 1830; died 1832)}
- Relatives: Benjamin Franklin Eastman (brother); Philip A. Eastman (brother)
- Occupation: Merchant, farmer

Samuel Eastman (October 27, 1784 – January 20, 1864) was an American merchant and politician from Strong, Maine. He served as a member of the Maine Senate during the 1831 term, and the Maine House of Representatives during the 1827 term.

== Biography ==
Samuel Eastman was born at Mount Vernon, Maine, then part of the District of Maine (in the state of Massachusetts), in October 1784.

He was elected to the Maine House of Representatives in 1826 as one of eleven representatives of what was then Somerset County, Maine, serving in the 7th Maine Legislature. A new post office was established in Strong in 1828, and Eastman was appointed the first postmaster there.

He was elected in 1830 to serve as the sole representative of Somerset County in the Maine Senate, for the 11th Maine Legislature.

== Personal life and family ==
Samuel Eastman was the eldest of eleven children born to Benjamin Eastman and his wife Ann Carr (née Barker). Ann was a grand-niece of Caleb Carr. The Eastman family were descended from Roger Eastman, who was born in Wales and emigrated to the Massachusetts Bay Colony in 1638 aboard a ship named the Confidence.

Samuel's younger brother, Benjamin Franklin Eastman was one of the founders of the Maine Republican Party and served as a state representative and member of the executive council in 1836, 1840, and 1857.

Samuel Eastman married Jane Hitchcock on March 22, 1807. They had twelve children, some of them had notable careers:

- Ben C. Eastman (born 1812) was a Wisconsin pioneer and served two terms in the United States House of Representatives in the 1850s.
- Harry Eugene Eastman (born 1819) was the 3rd mayor of Green Bay and a lieutenant colonel in the 2nd Wisconsin Cavalry Regiment during the American Civil War.
- John A. Eastman (born 1821) was the second lawyer to settle at Fond du Lac, Wisconsin, and served in the Wisconsin Senate. He married a daughter of congressman Mason C. Darling.
- George W. Eastman (born 1824) was a physician and banker and served as a surgeon and medical inspector for the Union Army.

Samuel Eastman died at his home in Strong, on January 20, 1864.

Maine Senate
Preceded by Ebenezer L. Phelps	Member of the Maine Senate from the Somerset County district January 5, 1831 – January 4, 1832	District abolished
