= Sewall A. Phillips =

American politician

Sewall A. Phillips was a member of the Wisconsin State Assembly.

== Biography ==
Phillips was born on April 29, 1839, in Turner, Maine, United States. He worked as a teacher. During the American Civil War, he served with the 2nd Regiment Wisconsin Volunteer Cavalry of the Union Army.

== Assembly career ==
Phillips was a member of the Assembly during the 1880 and 1881 sessions. He was a Republican.
