= Ben C. Eastman =

19th century American politician

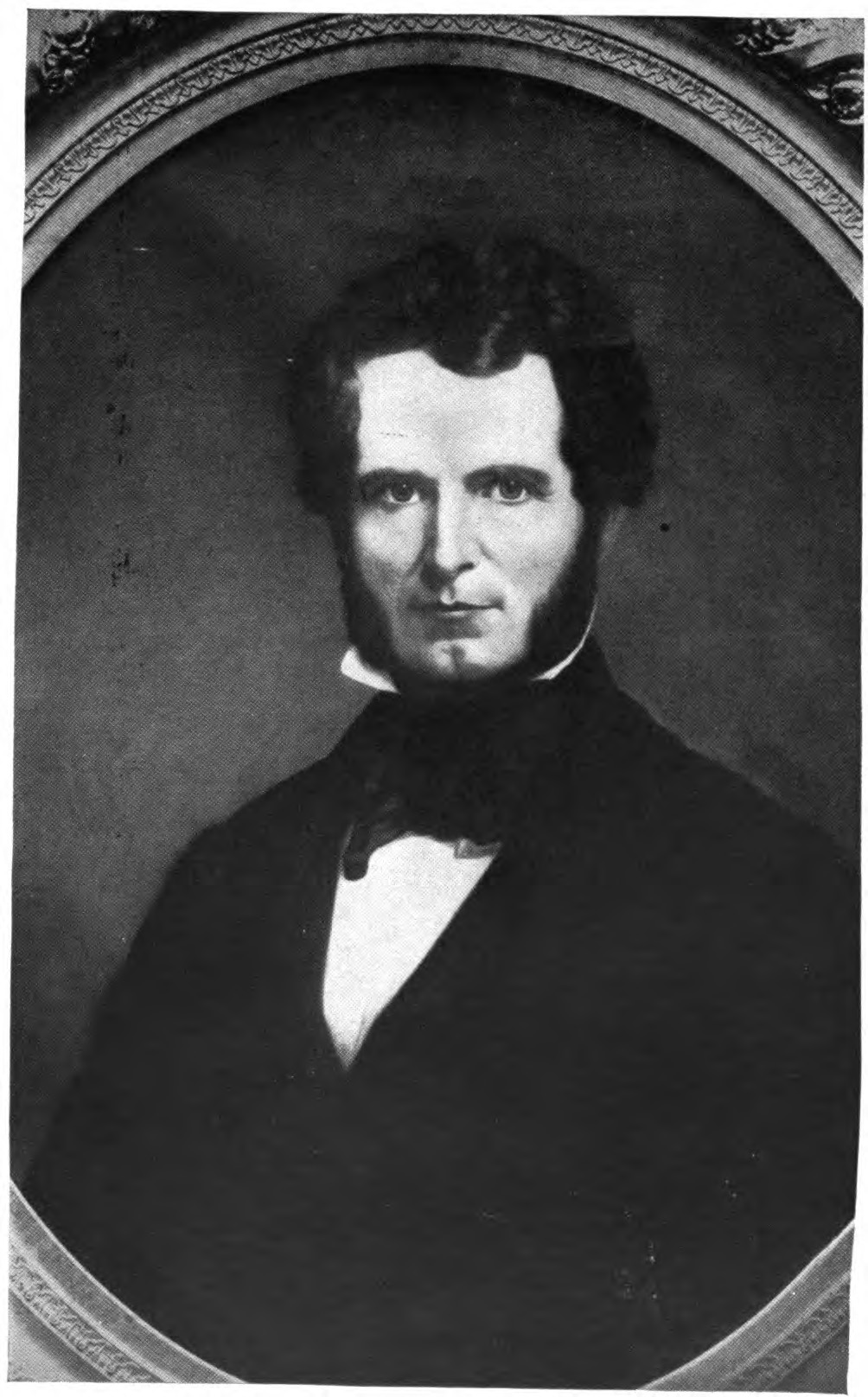

Member of the U.S. House of Representatives from Wisconsin's 2nd district
- In office March 4, 1851 – March 3, 1855
- Preceded by: Orsamus Cole
- Succeeded by: Cadwallader C. Washburn

Member of the Board of Supervisors of Grant County, Wisconsin
- In office January 1, 1849 – January 1, 1850

Secretary of the Council of the Wisconsin Territory
- In office December 4, 1843 – January 19, 1846
- Preceded by: John P. Sheldon
- Succeeded by: William Rudolph Smith

Personal details
- Born: October 24, 1812 Strong, District of Maine, Massachusetts, U.S.
- Died: February 2, 1856 (aged 43) Platteville, Wisconsin, U.S.
- Resting place: Forest Hill Cemetery, Madison, Wisconsin
- Party: Democratic
- Spouse: Charlotte Sophia Sewall (m. 1841–1856)
- Children: None
- Parents: Samuel Eastman (father); Jane (Hitchcock) Eastman (mother)
- Relatives: H. E. Eastman (brother); John A. Eastman (brother); Benjamin Franklin Eastman (uncle)
- Profession: Lawyer

Ben C. Eastman (October 24, 1812 – February 2, 1856) was an American lawyer, Democratic politician, and Wisconsin pioneer. He served two terms in the U.S. House of Representatives, representing Wisconsin's 2nd congressional district from 1851 to 1855. He previously served as secretary of the Council of the Wisconsin Territory during the 4th Wisconsin Territorial Assembly.

== Biography ==
Ben Eastman was born in the town of Strong, Maine, in what was then the District of Maine (part of Massachusetts). He attended public schools and received an academic education. He studied law under Judge William Emmons, of Hallowell, Maine, then later studied under Judge Hall of New York. He traveled west to the Wisconsin Territory in 1838, settling initially in Green Bay. In Green Bay, he was admitted to the bar and began practicing law in partnership with Morgan Lewis Martin.

After a year, he moved south to Grant County, settling in the town of Platteville, which remained his home for the rest of his life. At the second session of the 4th Wisconsin Territorial Assembly, Eastman was selected to serve as secretary of the Territorial Council (the upper legislative chamber), and was retained for the third and fourth sessions. He resigned about mid-way through the 4th session, on January 19, 1846. In 1847, he was a Democratic nominee for county commissioner, but the Whig Party carried nearly every office in Grant County that year. In 1848, Eastman commissioned a survey and plat on a section of land he owned in the town of Wingville, establishing the settlement of Montfort.

The first session of the Wisconsin circuit court in Grant County was held in October 1848, and Eastman was among ten lawyers admitted to practice before that court. In 1849, he was elected chairman of the Platteville town board, which made him ex officio a member of the county Board of Supervisors.

Wisconsin's 2nd congressional district 1848–1861

In 1850, Eastman ran for Congress on the Democratic ticket in what was then Wisconsin's 2nd congressional district. The 2nd district then comprised the entire western half of the state of Wisconsin. He defeated the incumbent Whig Party congressman, Orsamus Cole, and went on to serve in the 32nd Congress. He was re-elected in 1852, but declined to run for a third term in 1854. He returned to Platteville and resumed the practice of law.

He died in Platteville on February 2, 1856, after an illness of several weeks, He was interred in Forest Hill Cemetery in Madison, Wisconsin.

== Personal life and family ==
Ben Eastman was one of twelve children born to Samuel Eastman and his wife Jane (née Hitchcock). Samuel Eastman was a successful merchant in Maine and a state senator. The Eastman family were descended from Roger Eastman, who was born in Wales and emigrated to the Massachusetts Bay Colony in 1638 aboard a ship named the Confidence.

Several of Ben's brothers also ultimately settled in Wisconsin and made careers there.

- Ben's eldest brother, William Henry Eastman, (born 1808) settled in Green Bay in the 1870s after a career in the east.
- Harry Eugene Eastman (born 1819) was the 3rd mayor of Green Bay and a lieutenant colonel in the 2nd Wisconsin Cavalry Regiment during the American Civil War.
- John A. Eastman (born 1821) was the second lawyer to settle at Fond du Lac, Wisconsin, and served in the Wisconsin Senate. He married the daughter of congressman Mason C. Darling.
- George W. Eastman (born 1824) followed Ben to Wisconsin and settled in Platteville with him in 1850. He was a physician and banker and served as a surgeon and medical inspector for the Union Army.

Ben Eastman married Charlotte Sophia Sewall of Hallowell, Maine, in 1841. They had no children.

U.S. House of Representatives
Preceded by Orasmus Cole	Member of the U.S. House of Representatives from Wisconsin's 2nd congressional district March 4, 1851 – March 3, 1855	Succeeded by Cadwallader C. Washburn
