= William H. Morgan =

US Army Union general (1825–1878)

- Born: January 20, 1825; England, UK
- Died: September 3, 1878 (aged 53); New Orleans, Louisiana, U.S.
- Burial place: Chalmette National Cemetery, Chalmette, Louisiana
- Military career
- Allegiance: United States
- Branch: United States Volunteers; Union Army
- Service years: 1861–1865
- Rank: Major, USV; Brevet Brig. General, USV
- Unit: 2nd Reg. Wis. Vol. Cavalry
- Conflicts: American Civil War

William Henry Morgan (January 20, 1825 – September 3, 1878) was an English American immigrant, lawyer, and educator. He served as a Union Army officer in the American Civil War, serving as adjutant to General Cadwallader C. Washburn throughout the war. He received an honorary brevet to brigadier general in 1865.

== Biography ==
Morgan was born in England, in 1825, and emigrated to the United States, settling in Milwaukee, Wisconsin.

== Career ==
At the outbreak of the American Civil War, he volunteered for service in the Union Army and was enrolled as a 2nd lieutenant in the 2nd Wisconsin Cavalry Regiment, serving as adjutant to Colonel Cadwallader C. Washburn.

In June 1862, Washburn was appointed brigadier general commanding a cavalry brigade under General Samuel Ryan Curtis's Army of the Southwest. Morgan went with Washburn as adjutant of the brigade and was promoted to captain in this capacity in August 1862. Washburn was subsequently promoted to major general and given command of all cavalry forces in West Tennessee; Morgan remained adjutant to Washburn and was promoted to major. Morgan served with Washburn through the war and received an honorary brevet to brigadier general.

After the war, Morgan remained in the service for several years organizing militia volunteers in Tennessee, and subsequently moved to New Orleans, Louisiana. He died of Yellow Fever at New Orleans in 1878.
