= Charles L. Catlin =

American lawyer and politician

Charles Leland Catlin (February 24, 1842 – June 14, 1901) was an American lawyer and politician.

Born in Great Bend, Susquehanna County, Pennsylvania, Catlin moved with his parents to Green Lake, Wisconsin Territory in 1845. He then moved with his family to Hudson, Wisconsin. Catlin went to the Hudson Public Schools. Catlin served as a page with the Wisconsin Legislature. He served in the 2nd Regiment Wisconsin Volunteer Cavalry during the American Civil War. In 1867, Catlin graduated from Columbian Law School in Washington, D.C. Catlin then practiced law in Washington, D. C. From 1868 to 1876, Catlin practiced law in Pennsylvania. He moved back to Hudson, Wisconsin and practiced law with John Coit Spooner. In 1884, Catlin moved to Superior, Wisconsin and continued to practiced law. In 1899, Catlin served in the Wisconsin State Assembly and was a Republican. Catlin died from blood poisoning in Minneapolis, Minnesota.
