= Peter Eastman =

Peter Eastman may refer to:

- Peter Eastman (software engineer), developer of the 3D graphics application "Art of Illusion"
- Peter Eastman (artist) (born 1976), South African painter, printmaker and jewellery designer

== See also ==
- Eastman (surname)
