= Ostermann =

Ostermann is a German surname. Notable people with the surname include:

- Clemens Ostermann (1984–2007), German voice actor and musician
- Corny Ostermann (1911–1945), German jazz musician
- Edward Albert Ostermann (1882–1969), United States Marine Corps general
- Elard Ostermann (born 1968), German footballer
- Friedrich Ostermann (1932–2018), German Roman Catholic titular bishop
- Helmut Ostermann, birth name of the Israeli writer, journalist, politician, and activist Uri Avnery (1923–2018)
- Manfred Ostermann (born 1958), German politician
- Max-Hellmuth Ostermann (1917–1942), German World War II flying ace
- Ruy Carlos Ostermann (1934–2025), Brazilian journalist, writer, professor and politician
- Tim Ostermann (born 1979), German politician
- Willi Ostermann (1876–1936), German lyricist, composer and singer

== See also ==
- Alexander Ivanovich Ostermann-Tolstoy (1770–1857), Russian nobleman and soldier
- Osterman
