= Carmi W. Beach =

19th century American politician

Member of the Wisconsin State Assembly from the Columbia 3rd district
- In office January 3, 1870 – January 2, 1871
- Preceded by: Freeman M. Ross
- Succeeded by: George G. Marvin

Personal details
- Born: March 26, 1841 Hadley, New York, U.S.
- Died: January 6, 1888 (aged 46) Monrovia, California, U.S.
- Resting place: Mountain View Cemetery, Oakland, California
- Party: Republican
- Spouse: Helen Hanchett (m. 1870–1888)
- Children: Harry Beach

Military service
- Allegiance: United States
- Branch/service: United States Volunteers; Union Army
- Years of service: 1861–1865
- Rank: Captain, USV
- Unit: 2nd Reg. Wis. Vol. Cavalry
- Battles/wars: American Civil War

Carmi Warren Beach (March 26, 1841 – January 6, 1888) was an American merchant, Republican politician, and Wisconsin pioneer. He was a member of the Wisconsin State Assembly for one term, representing northern Columbia County in the 1870 session.

== Early life ==
Carmi W. Beach was born in Hadley, New York, in March 1841. He came to the Wisconsin Territory as a child, in 1846, and settled with his parents at Spring Prairie, in Walworth County. They moved to Columbia County a year later and settled on a farm in the town of Marcellon. Beach received a common school education, and then attended Ripon College.

== War service ==
At the outbreak of the American Civil War, Beach, then-20, volunteered for service in the Union Army and was enrolled as a private in Company E of the 2nd Wisconsin Cavalry Regiment. He was promoted to sergeant and first sergeant in the company and was then commissioned first lieutenant in the Fall of 1862. In the Spring of 1863, their captain, George N. Richmond was promoted to major for the battalion, and Beach was made captain of Company E. He held the role of company commander for most of the rest of the war, leaving at the expiration of his enlistment in January 1865.

The 2nd Wisconsin Cavalry was mostly involved in the western theater of the war, and participated in the Vicksburg Campaign, the Jackson Expedition, and the Franklin–Nashville campaign.

== Career ==
After returning to Wisconsin, Beach became involved with the Republican Party of Wisconsin. He was elected chairman of the town board in 1868 and was elected without opposition to the Wisconsin State Assembly in 1869. At the time he was the youngest member of the Legislature. He represented Columbia County's 3rd Assembly district, which then comprised most of the north half of the county.

In the Fall of 1875, he went west to California, settling first at San Jose, then moving to San Francisco, where he was elected to the city board of education. He suffered from poor health for many years and moved south to seek a more hospitable climate. He died in Monrovia, California, in January 1888.

== Personal life and family ==
Carmi Beach was a twin, one of seven children of Nathan Beach and his wife Sarah (née Wilcox). His twin sister, Caroline, also later moved to the west coast, settling in Oregon. Nathan Beach started the first blacksmith shop in the town of Marcellon and served several years on the town board. Carmi's elder brother, Isaac, was also a prominent citizen in Marcellon.

Carmi Beach married Helen M. Hanchett, the daughter of Asahel Hanchett, who founded the settlement known as Hanchettville, in what later became the town of Marshall, Dane County, Wisconsin. They had at least one son.

Wisconsin State Assembly
Preceded by Freeman M. Ross	Member of the Wisconsin State Assembly from the Columbia 3rd district January 3, 1870 – January 2, 1871	Succeeded by George G. Marvin
