= ESL Federal Credit Union =

Federal credit union in Rochester, New York, US

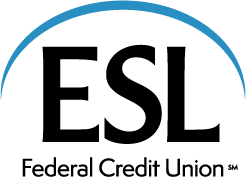

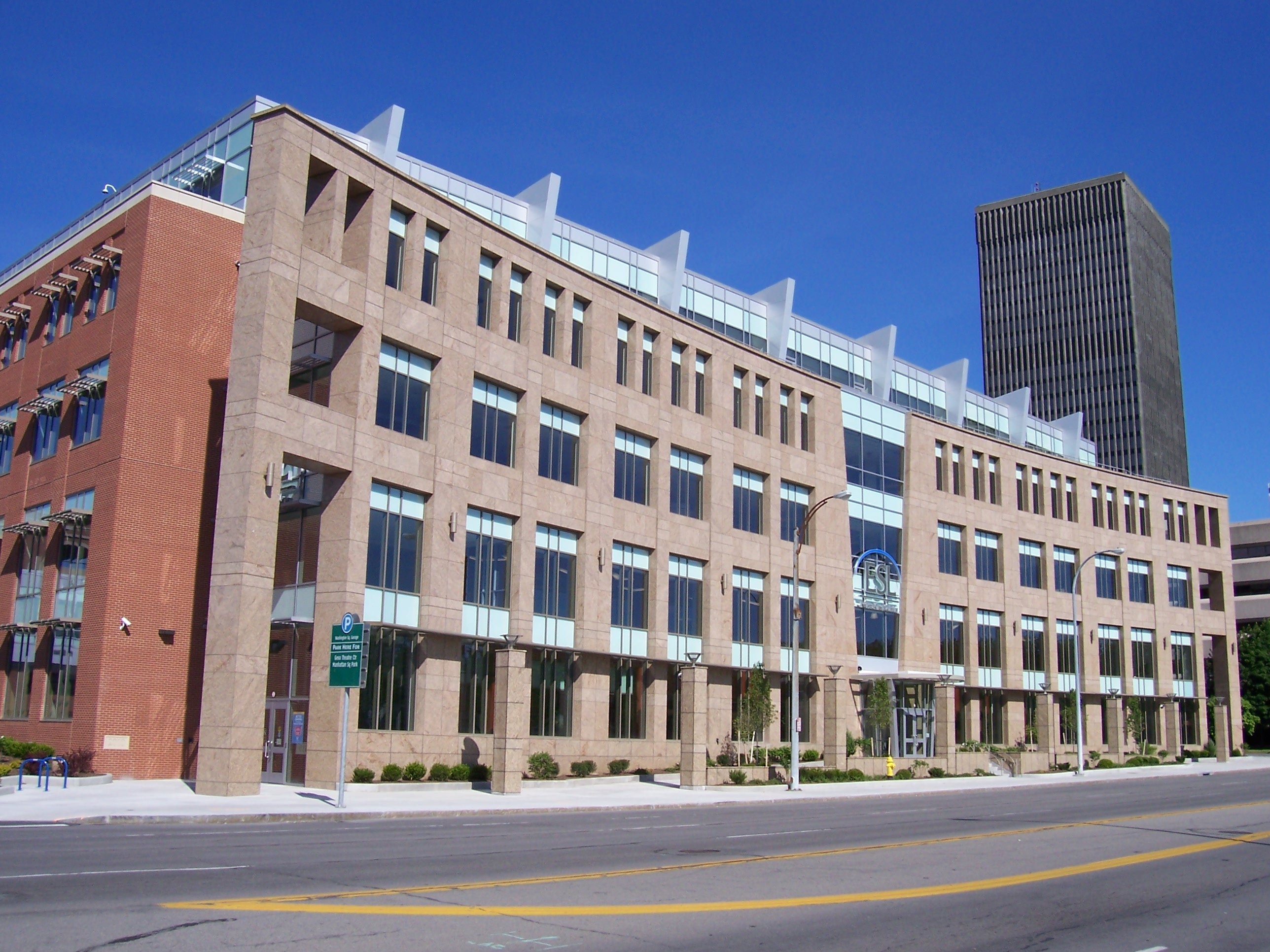
- Headquarters in Rochester, New York
- Type: Credit union
- Industry: Financial services
- Founded: 1920
- Headquarters: Rochester, New York
- Area served: Greater Rochester Area
- Key people: Tom Rogers, president & CEO
- Products: Savings, checking, consumer loans, mortgages, credit cards, online banking, mobile banking, business banking
- Total assets: $10.6 billion
- Number of employees: 1,000
- Subsidiaries: ESL Investment Services, LLC; ESL Trust Services, LLC; Cooper/Haims Advisors, LLC; Alesco Advisors
- Website: esl.org

ESL Federal Credit Union is a full-service financial institution with headquarters in Rochester, New York. The locally owned financial institution employs more than 1,000 people in Rochester, New York, and includes more than 465,000 members and 18,700 businesses.

Access to the credit union includes 33 branch locations and more than 40 ATM locations, locally based telephone and internet chat centers, and online and mobile banking channels. Membership in ESL is open to employees of Eastman Kodak, members of the George Eastman House, and residents of Rochester, among others.

The company has appeared on annual Great Place to Work lists since 2010 when it was first named a Best Medium Workplace. ESL has also been named a Best Workplace for Women, Best Workplaces for Millennials, Best Workplaces in Financial Services & Insurance, and Best Workplaces in New York State.

== History ==
ESL Federal Credit Union was chartered in 1920 as Eastman Savings and Loan Association by George Eastman, founder of Eastman Kodak Company. Eastman’s intent was to provide his employees with a financial institution that served their financial needs by providing savings accounts and mortgages.

On February 1, 1996, Eastman Savings and Loan changed its charter from a U.S. bank to a federal credit union, changing its name to ESL Federal Credit Union.

== Community Giving ==
The organization also supports local communities through its Community Impact initiative, which averages approximately $20 million in annual philanthropic grants. Since 1996, ESL has distributed an annual Owners' Dividend to eligible members. In 2025, the credit union distributed approximately $29 million through the program.

== Wealth Management ==
The credit union has expanded its wealth management business, including adding Trust Services in 2017, acquiring Cooper/Haims Advisors in 2019, Alesco Advisors in 2025 , and Generations Bank in 2026.

ESL is the largest locally owned financial institution in the Greater Rochester area, and the second largest credit union in New York State. ESL is in the top 1% of national credit unions ranked by assets.
