= You Press the Button, We Do the Rest =

Kodak slogan

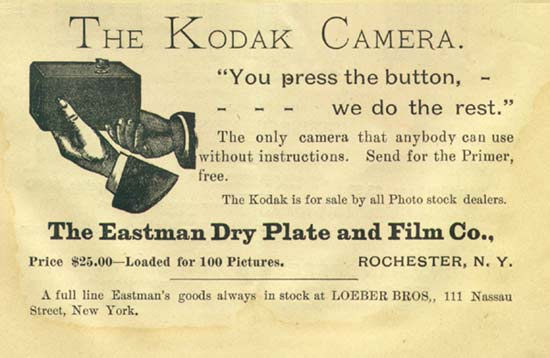
Advertisement for the Kodak camera containing the slogan.

"You Press the Button, We Do the Rest" was an advertising slogan coined by George Eastman, the founder of Kodak, in 1888. Eastman believed in making photography available to the world, and making it possible for anyone who had the desire to take great pictures. Until then, taking photographs was a complicated process that could only be accomplished if the photographer could process and develop film. With his new slogan, Eastman and the Eastman Kodak Company became wildly successful and helped make photography popular.

== Background ==
Eastman's first camera, the Detective, was created in 1886. Only 50 were made, and did not sell well. Soon after in 1888, Eastman created a superior model, the Eastman Kodak camera to replace his poorly selling Detective. The Kodak inspired the slogan "You Press the Button, We Do the Rest." Eastman wrote the owner's manual for the Kodak, although he originally hired an advertising expert to do the job. Displeased with the man's inability to understand the simplicity of his picture-taking machine, Eastman took over the writing and created the slogan.

Part of Eastman's success was his business sense, which allowed him to see the potential in photography for amateurs. Eastman believed that amateur picture taking could eventually interest just about everyone, and in order to make it happen, he set about separating the two main functions of photography: the picture taking and the processing. For Eastman, 'We Do the Rest' was literally true. Customers had to simply take their pictures, send their camera to the Kodak factory in Rochester New York. At the Kodak factory, film was separated from the camera, cut into strips of twelve exposures, developed and stripped, pressed in contact with a clear gelatin skin, and dried. Then, prints were made from each negative and pasted on mounts and returned to customers, along with the negatives, the camera, and a new roll of film.

== Target market ==
George Eastman believed amateur photography attracted two groups of people. The first was "true amateurs", who were people willing and able to devote time and money to learn the art of photography. They had the skills in developing, printing, and toning, and they had a sense of photography as an art form. The second group simply wanted pictures as mementos of their daily lives but were hardly interested in learning how to do the rest. Eastman believed the second group was large in number. He decided to market his products to both groups, however, he soon realized that the second group could be expanded to virtually every person on earth, and used his "We Do the Rest" slogan to attract them.

== Marketing strategy ==
In 1889, when the camera was ready for distribution, Eastman began to advertise in national magazines and weeklies, including Harper's, Scribner's Magazine, Scientific American, Harper's Weekly, Frank Leslie, Time Magazine, and Puck Magazine. The phrase "You Press the Button, We Do the Rest" was also accompanied by customer testimonials on full-page ads. The Kodak sold for $25.00.

== Outcome ==
Thanks to the "We Do the Rest" advertising campaign, the Kodak camera became wildly popular and Eastman and his Kodak company revolutionized the photography business in the United States and in the world. Thanks to the income generated from advertising this camera, Eastman Kodak was able to dominate competition and lead the way in photography innovations for years.
