= Center for Governmental Research =

The Center for Governmental Research, Inc.
- Abbreviation: CGR
- Formation: 1915
- Founder: George Eastman
- Type: non-profit
- Location: Rochester, New York

The Center for Governmental Research, Inc. (CGR) is a non-profit corporation delivering data support, management consulting and implementation assistance to governments, educational institutions, foundations and non-profit organizations. Headquartered in Rochester, New York, it was founded by George Eastman in 1915 as the Rochester Bureau of Municipal Research to provide research and guidance to its home city's government and community institutions. Over the decades, CGR has grown from a bureau focused on the needs of one city into an organization with broader reach.

Today, CGR serves communities throughout the northeastern United States. Its major practice areas are government management and education, public finance and economics, health and human services, and community data and information management. It is an industry expert in working with communities on issues of municipal efficiency, economic and fiscal impact, public service delivery and local government restructuring, including evaluating the impacts of potential municipal consolidation. It served as project manager for the 2013 municipal consolidation of Princeton, New Jersey, one of the largest municipal restructurings in New Jersey in almost a century.Via Governing Magazine It also developed the voter-approved plan in Seneca Falls, New York, resulting in the largest village dissolution in New York history. Via CBS News

CGR's president and CEO is Erika Rosenberg Its past president and chief executive officer was Dr. Joseph Stefko.
