= J.P. Osterman =

American science fiction author

J.P. Osterman is an American science fiction author who focuses on space travel. She was one of five finalists in the Brevard Library Foundation's "Patrick D. Smith Literary Award". She is a director at the Space Coast Writers Guild and is a member of Scribblers of Brevard County. She has written eight novels, mostly science fiction

Osterman graduated with a master's degree from Azusa Pacific University, and she has a B.A. in English (Emphasis in Writing) from the University of San Diego. In the 1990s, she met Ray Bradbury who inspired her to write serious science fiction.

Her play Salt and Sand Never Tasted Better, which she co-wrote with Richard Mariani is published in the book, Love and Rockets.

== Awards ==
- Rupert Hughes Award for her novel, The Matter Stream,
- San Diego Writer's Monthly magazine first place award for her one-act play, The Man Next to Me

== Books ==
- Cosmic Rift
- First Communication (Book I, The Nelta Series)
- Battlefield Matrix (Book II)
- Astrocity Sagan (Book III)
- The Screaming Stone
- Corporate Revenge
- Commuter Collection: Short Stories from the Edge
- The Matter Stream
