= Benjamin Franklin Eastman =

19th century American politician

Benjamin F. Eastman

Member of the Executive Council of Maine
- In office January 1, 1857 – January 1, 1858 Serving with William M. Reed, Ichabod Frost, Isaac Lincoln, Nathaniel A. Joy, Joseph S. Monroe, & Abner Coburn
- In office January 1, 1840 – January 1, 1841 Serving with Gowen Wilson, John Webb, Alpheus Lyon, Nathan C. Fletcher, John Burnham, & Micah J. Talbot

Member of the Maine House of Representatives from the Somerset County district
- In office January 6, 1836 – January 1837 Serving with 14 others

Personal details
- Born: November 22, 1800 Mount Vernon, District of Maine, Massachusetts, U.S.
- Died: February 10, 1894 (aged 93) Portland, Maine, U.S.
- Resting place: Evergreen Cemetery, Portland
- Party: Republican; Democratic (before 1855)
- Spouse: Eliza Dyar (m. 1828; died 1874)
- Children: Eliza Veldora (Spaulding)^{(b. 1829; died 1898)}; Briceno Mendez Eastman^{(b. 1831; died 1921)}; James Fred Eastman^{(b. 1833; died 1915)}; Sarah Imogene (Phillips)^{(b. 1835; died 1926)}; Ermon Dwight Eastman^{(b. 1839; died 1911)}
- Relatives: Samuel Eastman (brother); Philip A. Eastman (brother); Ben C. Eastman (nephew); H. E. Eastman (nephew); John A. Eastman (nephew)
- Occupation: Merchant, politician

Military service
- Allegiance: United States
- Branch/service: Maine militia
- Rank: Colonel

Benjamin Franklin Eastman (November 22, 1800 – February 10, 1894) was an American merchant and politician from Franklin County, Maine. He was one of the founders of the Maine Republican Party. He served two terms on the Executive Council of Maine (1840 and 1857), and served one term in the Maine House of Representatives (1836). He was also one of the founding members of the Maine State Agricultural Society. He was often referred to by the honorific "colonel" due to service in the Maine militia. His name was also often abbreviated as B. F. Eastman.

== Biography ==
Benjamin Franklin Eastman was born at Mount Vernon, Maine, then part of the District of Maine (in the state of Massachusetts), in November 1800. As a child, he moved with his family to Phillips, Maine, where he was raised and educated. As a young man, he opened a store in Strong, Maine, where he made his residence for many years.

He was elected to the Maine House of Representatives in 1835, as one of fifteen representatives of what was then a larger Somerset County in the 16th Maine Legislature.

In January 1840, he was elected by the 20th Maine Legislature as one of seven councilors on the Executive Council of Maine, running on the Democratic Party ticket.

Through his early political career, Eastman was associated with the Democratic Party. But in 1854, he was one of the organizers of the Maine Republican Party and remained a member of the Republican Party for the rest of his life. He was described in his obituary as a lifelong friend of fellow Maine Republican Party founder Hannibal Hamlin.

In 1855, he was one of the founding members of the Maine State Agricultural Society, as established by the Maine Legislature. He ran for Maine Senate in the fall of 1855 on the Republican Party ticket, but lost the election. The 37th Maine Legislature again elected Eastman to serve on the Executive Council for the year 1857.

== Personal life and family ==
Benjamin Franklin Eastman was the ninth of eleven children born to Benjamin Eastman and his wife Ann Carr (née Barker). Ann was a grand-niece of Rhode Island colonial governor Caleb Carr. The Eastman family were descended from Roger Eastman, who was born in Wales and emigrated to the Massachusetts Bay Colony in 1638 aboard a ship named the Confidence.

Benjamin's eldest brother, Samuel Eastman also served in the Maine House of Representatives and Senate. Samuel had several notable children, including Ben C. Eastman, who served two terms in the U.S. House of Representatives.

Benjamin's younger brother Philip A. Eastman also served in the Maine House of Representatives and Senate.

Benjamin Franklin Eastman married Eliza Dyar in March 1828. They had five children together and were married for 47 years before her death in 1875.

Later in life, Benjamin Eastman moved to Portland, Maine, to live with his daughter, Eliza Spaulding. He died at her home in Portland on February 10, 1894.
