= John A. Eastman =

19th century American politician

Member of the Wisconsin Senate from the 4th district
- In office January 7, 1850 – January 5, 1852
- Preceded by: Warren Chase
- Succeeded by: Bertine Pinckney

Personal details
- Born: John Albert Eastman; March 4, 1821 Strong, Maine, U.S.
- Died: April 11, 1895 (aged 74) Benton Harbor, Michigan, U.S.
- Party: Democratic
- Spouse: Helen Mar Darling (m. 1848; died 1891)
- Children: 1
- Parent: Samuel Eastman (father)
- Relatives: Ben C. Eastman (brother); H. E. Eastman (brother); Mason C. Darling (father-in-law); Benjamin Franklin Eastman (uncle)

John Albert Eastman (March 4, 1821 – April 11, 1895) was an American lawyer, politician, and pioneer of Wisconsin and Michigan. He served two years in the Wisconsin Senate, representing Wisconsin's 4th Senate district during the 1850 and 1851 terms.

== Background ==
Eastman was born in Strong, Maine. Until the age of eighteen worked on his father's farm during the season, going to school during the winter. In December 1839, he entered the Charleston Academy in Charleston, Maine, and in September 1841, began the study of law in the office of Philip M. Stubbs, and continued until the fall of 1843, teaching during the winters in Strong and Kingfield. On September 14, 1843, he left Strong and went to Platteville, Wisconsin, arriving there October 5, and taught school during the following winter. In 1844, he went to Fond du Lac, selecting that place as his future home.

He was the second lawyer in Fond du Lac County (he would eventually go into partnership with Erastus Drury). Eastman taught a "select school" in Fond du Lac with as many as twenty students from 1844-45 until a public school was organized in 1846.

A three-page letter from Eastman in "Fonddulac" [sic] to a Miss Frances A. Eastman in Strong, Maine (apparently his sister) dated October 20, 1846 survives, in which he complains that "constant labor" has reduced his weight from 170 pounds back in "Old Maine" to 148 pounds. He describes himself as busy there; he is the postmaster, and there are nine mails a week. He reports that he is engaged to "a fine amiable little girl, not handsome nor 'accomplished', but quiet, domestic, confiding" and that she thinks him "quite a fellow for a Yankee." Eastman had been postmaster since 1845, and was to remain postmaster until April 1849, when the new Whig presidential administration replaced him with a Whig. It is unclear whether the "fine amiable little girl" referred to is the same person as the Helen Mar Darling whom he married on January 6, 1848.

== Public office ==
In 1844, Eastman became the first "Register or Clerk" of the newly created Fond du Lac County Probate Court. On March 1, 1847, he was elected as a trustee as part of the first government for the newly-chartered village of Fond du Lac. In 1848, he was defeated for county judge by John Bannister, and for state senator by Warren Chase, a Free Soiler.

In 1849, he was on the school board for Fond du Lac.

Eastman was elected in 1849 from the Fourth District, at that time consisting of Fond du Lac and Winnebago Counties. He was the candidate of the Regular Democrats or "Hunker" faction of the Wisconsin Democratic Party, and defeated Lucas M. Miller the candidate of the "Union Democratic Party" (soon to join the Free Soil Party) faction.

He was succeeded by Bertine Pinckney, a Whig.

== Business interests ==
Eastman built the first law office in Fond du Lac, on Main Street; he was the son-in-law of Mason C. Darling, and helped manage The Exchange Bank of Darling & Company along with his brother-in-law Keyes Darling.

In January 1847 Eastman was one of the seven commissioners appointed by a private act of the legislature to sell stock in the newly-chartered Sheboygan and Fond du Lac Railroad Company, along with former governor Nathaniel Tallmadge, Moses S. Gibson and Benjamin F. Moore. The railroad itself failed to materialize, due to a lack of enthusiasm (particularly on the Fond du Lac end).

From March 1849 to May 1851, he was part-owner of the Fond du Lac Journal.

== Departure from Wisconsin; Illinois, Michigan, and death ==
In the spring of 1864 he moved to Chicago, Illinois, at the same time as his father-in-law the former Congressman. In Chicago Eastman practiced law and "engaged... in some commercial pursuits" until May 1873, when he moved to Benton Harbor, Michigan, where he practiced law until his death. He died at Benton Harbor on April 11, 1895, of a liver abscess.

== Personal life and family ==
John Eastman was one of twelve children born to Samuel Eastman and his wife Jane (née Hitchcock). Samuel Eastman was a successful merchant in Maine and a state senator. The Eastman family were descended from Roger Eastman, who was born in Wales and emigrated to the Massachusetts Bay Colony in 1638 aboard a ship named the Confidence.

Several of John's brothers were also notable.

- John's eldest brother, William Henry Eastman, (born 1808) settled in Green Bay in the 1870s after a career in the east.
- Ben C. Eastman (born 1812) was a member of the United States House of Representatives from Wisconsin in the 1850s.
- Harry Eugene Eastman (born 1819) was the 3rd mayor of Green Bay and a lieutenant colonel in the 2nd Wisconsin Cavalry Regiment during the American Civil War. He also lived out the later years of his life in Benton Harbor, Michigan.
- George W. Eastman (born 1824) settled in Platteville in 1850. He was a physician and banker and served as a surgeon and medical inspector for the Union Army.

John Eastman married Helen Mar Darling, the daughter of Mason C. Darling, on January 6, 1848. They had one son, Frank Lewis Eastman. Helen died in 1891.

Wisconsin Senate
Preceded by Warren Chase	Member of the Wisconsin Senate from the 4th district January 7, 1850 – January 5, 1852	Succeeded by Bertine Pinckney
