= Eastmaninstitutet =

Dental care facility in Stockholm, Sweden

Coordinates: 59°20′25″N 18°02′46″E

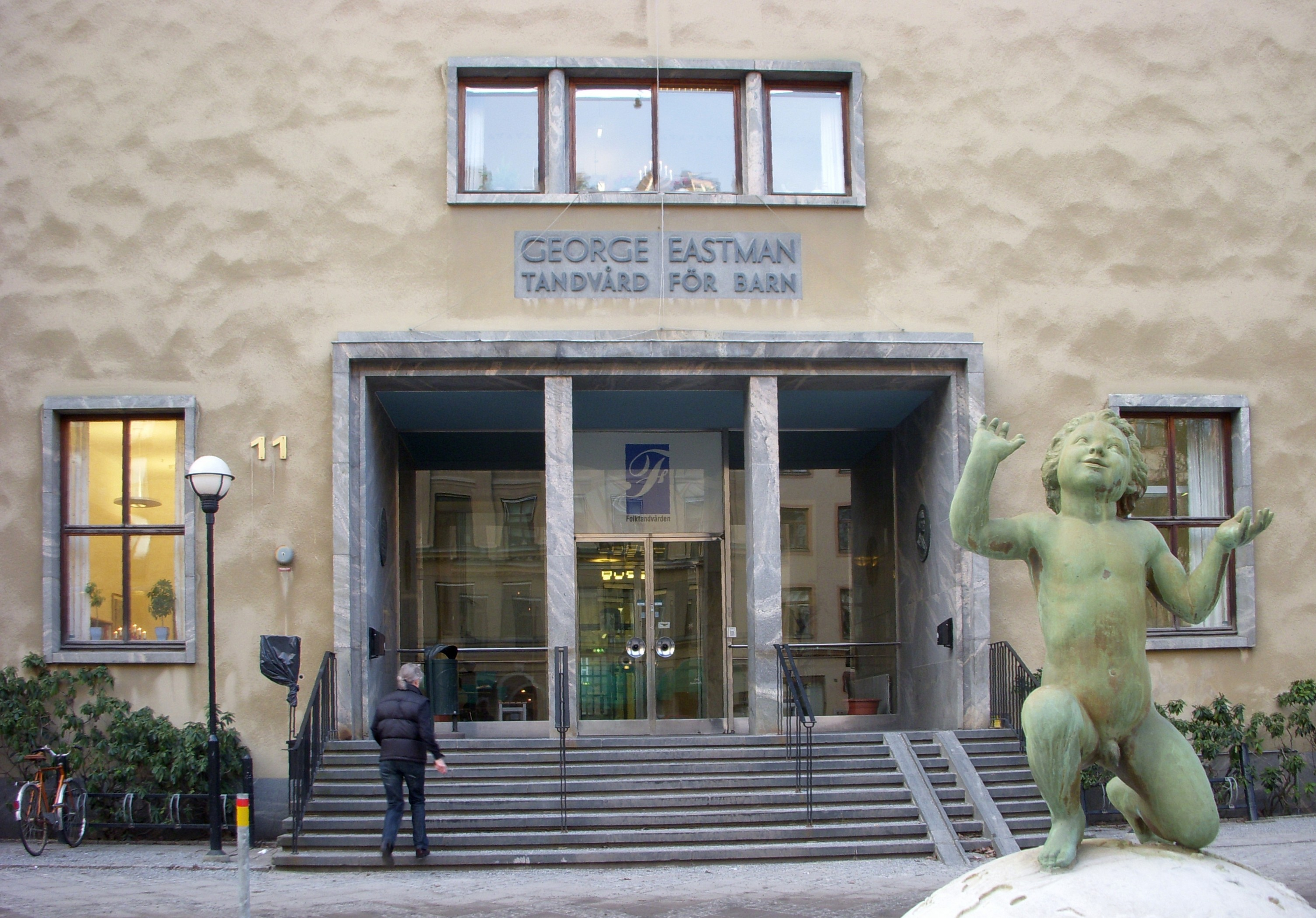
Eastmaninstitutet in Stockholm

Eastmaninstitutet (The Eastman Institute) is a dental care centre specialized in orthodontics, periodontology and oral surgery located in Vasastaden, Stockholm, Sweden. It was built with a million dollar donation from the American inventor George Eastman and opened in 1937.
