= David Eastman =

David Eastman may refer to:

- David Eastman (wrongful conviction) (born 1945), Australian public servant wrongfully convicted of killing a senior police officer
- David Eastman (British Army officer) (born 1970), senior British Army officer
- David Eastman (politician) (born 1981), Alaskan politician
