= George Eastman =

American entrepreneur, inventor, and photographer (1854–1932)

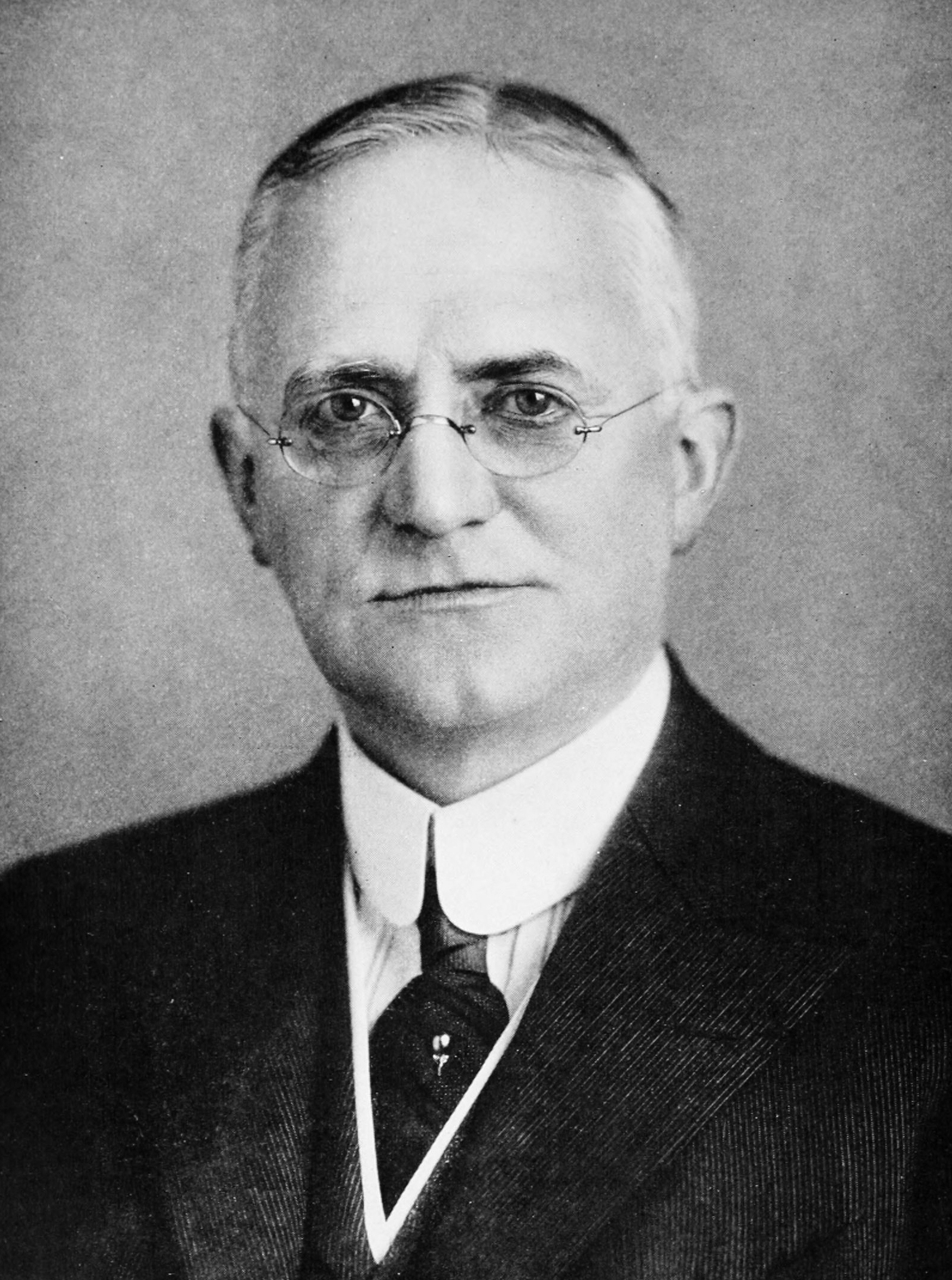
- Eastman in 1917
- Born: July 12, 1854; Waterville, New York, U.S.
- Died: March 14, 1932 (aged 77); Rochester, New York, U.S.
- Resting place: Ashes buried at Eastman Business Park (Kodak Park)
- Occupations: Businessman, inventor, philanthropist
- Known for: Photography pioneer; Founder of Eastman Kodak

Signature
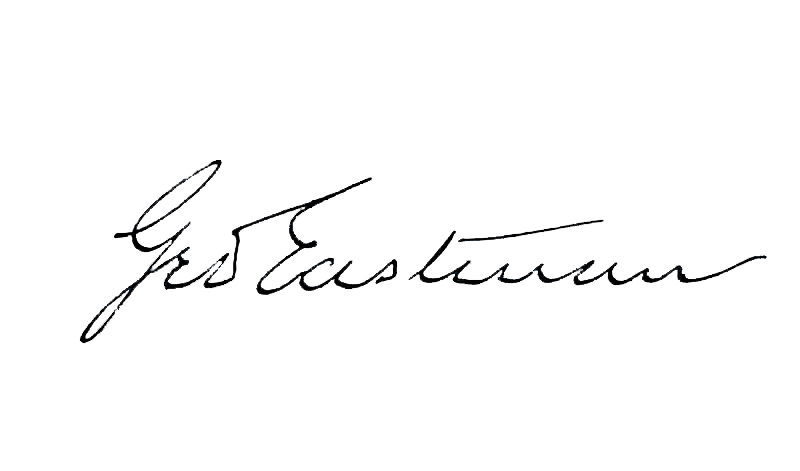

George Eastman (July 12, 1854 – March 14, 1932) was an American innovator and entrepreneur who founded the Eastman Kodak Company and helped to bring the photographic use of roll film into the mainstream. After a decade of experiments in photography, he patented and sold a roll film camera, making amateur photography accessible to the general public for the first time. Working as the treasurer and later president of Kodak, he oversaw the expansion of the company and the film industry.

Eastman was a major philanthropist, establishing the Eastman School of Music, Rochester Philharmonic Orchestra, and schools of dentistry and medicine at the University of Rochester and Eastman Dental Hospital at University College London, and making large contributions to the Rochester Institute of Technology (RIT), the construction of several buildings at the second campus of Massachusetts Institute of Technology (MIT) on the Charles River, and Tuskegee University and Hampton University, two historically black universities in the South. With interests in improving health, he provided funds for clinics in London and other European cities to serve low-income residents.

In his final two years, Eastman was in intense pain caused by a disorder affecting his spine. On March 14, 1932, he shot himself in the heart, leaving a note which read, "To my friends: my work is done. Why wait?"

Eastman is regarded as one of the most influential and well-known residents of Rochester, New York. He has been commemorated on several college campuses and the Hollywood Walk of Fame, and the George Eastman Museum has been designated a National Historic Landmark.

== Early life ==
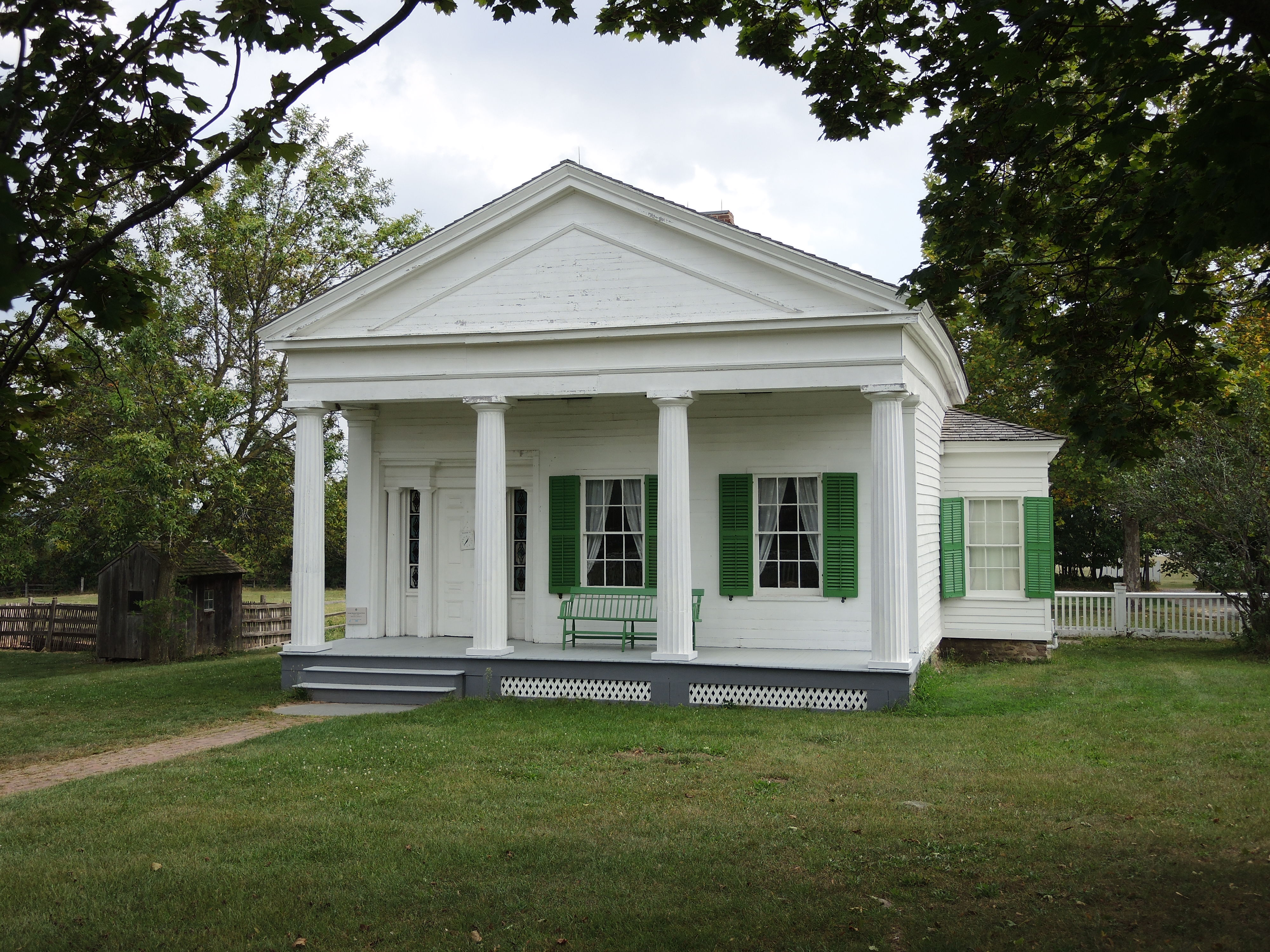
Eastman's boyhood home, relocated from Waterville to the Genesee Country Village and Museum

Eastman was born in Waterville, New York, as the youngest child of George Washington Eastman and Maria Eastman (née Kilbourn), at the 10-acre (4.0 ha) farm which his parents had bought in 1849. He had two older sisters, Ellen Maria and Katie. He was largely self-educated, although he attended a private school in Rochester after the age of eight.

In the early 1840s, his father had started a business school, the Eastman Commercial College in Rochester, New York. The city became one of the first "boomtowns" in the United States, based on its rapid industrialization. As his father's health started deteriorating, the family gave up the farm and moved to Rochester in 1860. His father died of a brain disorder on April 27, 1862. To survive and afford George's schooling, his mother took in boarders.

The second daughter, Katie, had contracted polio when young and died in late 1870 when George was 15 years old. The young George left school early and started working to help support the family. As Eastman began to have success with his photography business, he vowed to repay his mother for the hardships she had endured in raising him.

== Career ==
=== Founding of Kodak ===
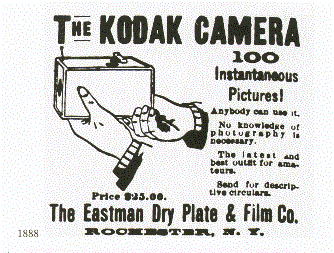
An advertisement from 1888 of the first Kodak camera

While working as a bank clerk in the 1870s, Eastman became interested in photography. After receiving lessons from George Monroe and George Selden, he developed a machine for coating dry plates in 1879. In 1881, he founded the Eastman Dry Plate Company with Henry Strong to sell plates, with Strong as company president and Eastman as treasurer, where he handled most executive functions. Around the same time, he began experiments to create a flexible film roll that could replace plates altogether. In 1885, he received a patent for a film roll and then focused on creating a camera to use the rolls. In 1888, he patented and released the Kodak camera ("Kodak" being a word Eastman created). It was sold loaded with enough roll film for 100 exposures. When all the frames had been exposed, the photographer mailed the camera back to the Eastman company in Rochester, along with $10. The company would process the film, make a print of each exposure, load another roll of film into the camera, and send the camera and the prints to the photographer.

The separation of photo-taking from the difficult process of film development was novel and made photography more accessible to amateurs than ever before, and the camera was immediately popular with the public. By August 1888, Eastman was struggling to meet orders, and he and his employees soon had several other cameras in development. The rapidly-growing Eastman Dry Plate Company was reorganized as the Eastman Company in 1889, and then incorporated as Eastman Kodak in 1892.

=== Growth of film industry ===
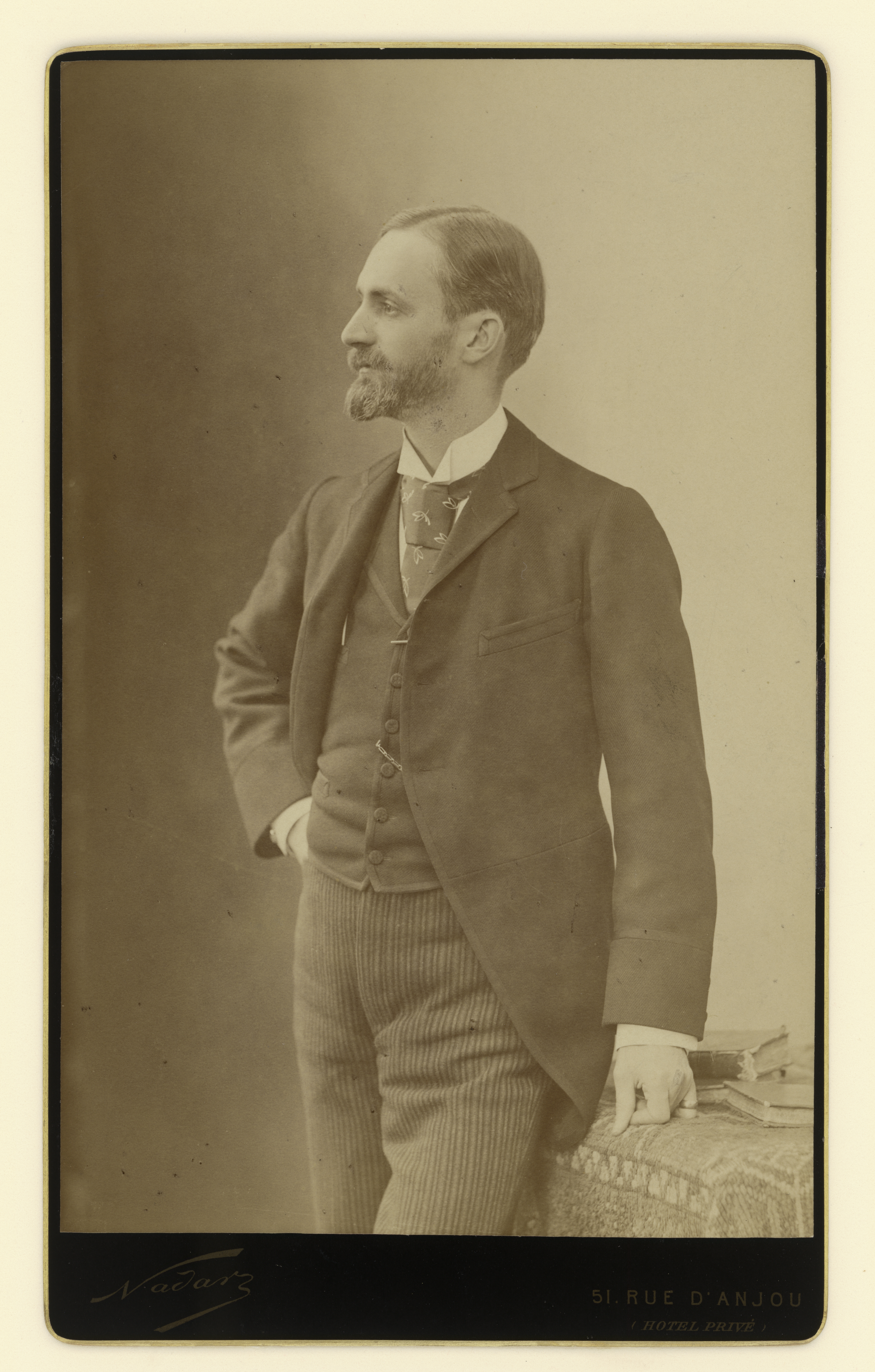
Portrait of Eastman by Paul Nadar, 1890

Eastman recognized that most of his revenue would come from the sale of additional film rolls, rather than camera sales, and focused on film production. By providing quality and affordable film to every camera manufacturer, Kodak managed to turn competitors into de facto business partners. In 1889 he patented the processes for the first nitrocellulose film along with chemist Henry Reichenbach. Several patent infringement lawsuits would preoccupy Eastman and his lawyers in subsequent years, including one from Reichenbach after he was fired in 1892. The largest lawsuit would come from rival film producer Ansco. Inventor Hannibal Goodwin had filed a patent for nitrocellulose film in 1887, before Eastman and Reichenbach's, but it was not granted until 1898. Ansco purchased the patent in 1900 and sued Kodak for infringement. Kodak ultimately lost the suit, which lasted over a decade and cost the company $5 Million.

Eastman paid close attention to Kodak's advertisements. He coined the slogan, "You press the button, we do the rest", which became ubiquitous in the general public.

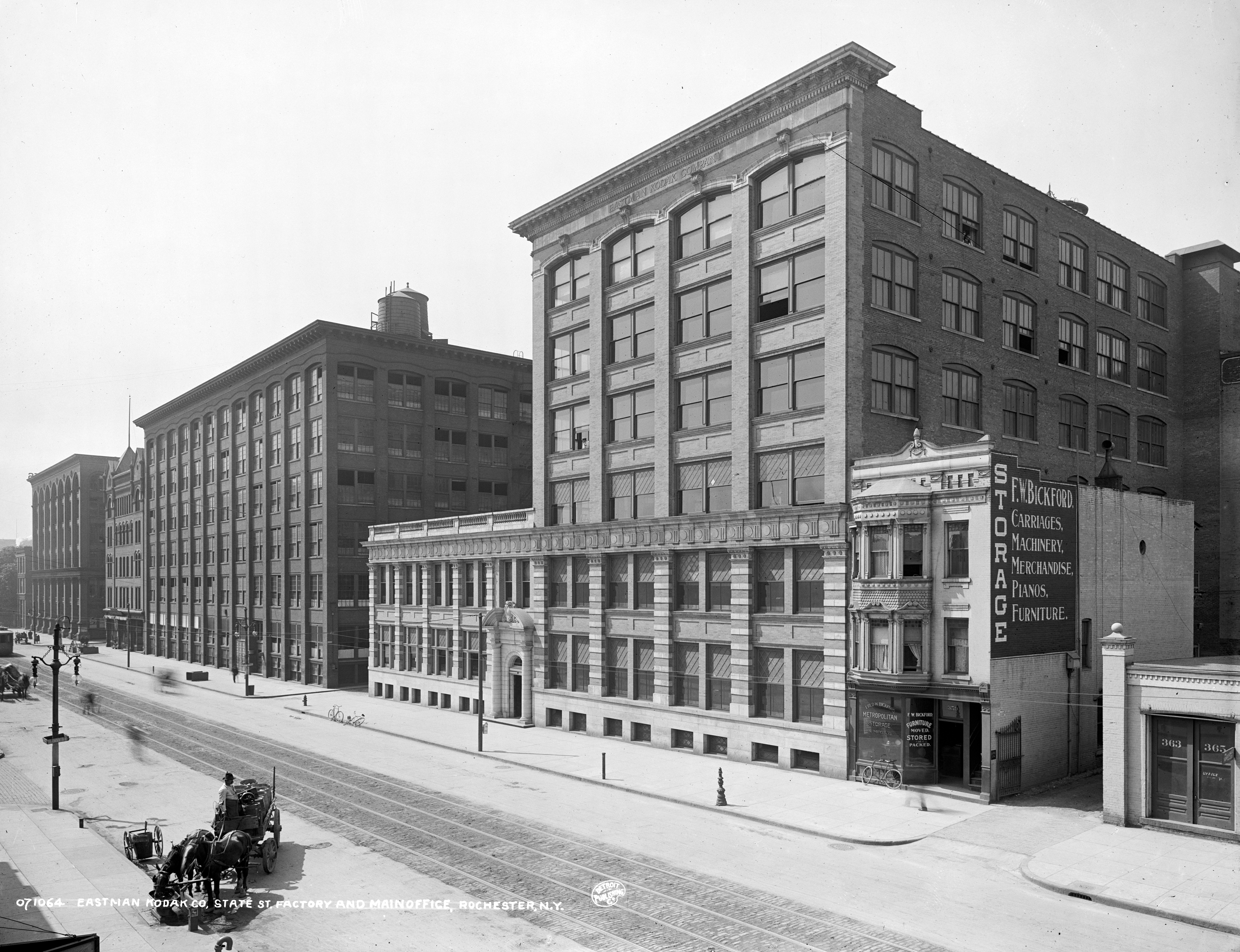
The Kodak factory and main office in Rochester, c. 1900–1910

As Kodak pursued a monopoly on film through patents and acquisitions, the company experienced rapid growth. By 1896, Kodak was the leading supplier of film stock internationally, and by 1915, the company was the largest employer in Rochester, with over 8,000 employees and annual earnings of $15.7 million. In 1934, shortly after Eastman's death, Kodak employed 23,000. One of the largest markets for film became the emerging motion picture industry. When Thomas Edison and other film producers formed the Motion Picture Patents Company in 1908, Eastman negotiated for Kodak to be the sole supplier of film to the industry. His monopolistic actions attracted the attention of the federal government, which began an anti-trust investigation into Kodak in 1911 for exclusive contracts, acquisitions of competitors, and price-fixing. This resulted in a lawsuit against Kodak in 1913 and a final judgment in 1921, ordering Kodak to stop fixing prices and sell many of its interests.

Kodak's growth was sustained during the 20th century by innovations in film and cameras, including the Brownie camera, which was marketed to children. Eastman took interest in color photography in 1904, and funded experiments in color film production for the next decade. The resulting product, created by John Capstaff, was a two-color process named Kodachrome. Later, in 1935, Kodak would release the more famous second Kodachrome, the first marketed integral tripack film. During World War I, Eastman established a photographic school in Rochester to train pilots for aerial reconnaissance.

In an era of growing trade union activities, Eastman sought to counter the union movement by anticipating worker demands. To this end, he implemented several worker benefit programs, including a welfare fund to provide workmen's compensation in 1910 and a profit-sharing program for all employees in 1912.

== Personal life ==
Eastman never married. He was close to his mother and to his sister Ellen Maria and her family. He had a long platonic relationship with Josephine Dickman, a trained singer and the wife of business associate George Dickman. He became especially close to Dickman after the death of his mother, Maria Eastman, in 1907. He was also an avid traveler, enjoyed music and social gatherings, and had a passion for playing the piano.

The loss of his mother, Maria, was particularly crushing to George. Almost pathologically concerned with decorum, he found himself, for the first time, unable to control his emotions in the presence of his friends. "When my mother died, I cried all day", he said later. "I could not have stopped to save my life." Due to his mother's reluctance to accept his gifts, Eastman could never do enough for his mother during her lifetime. He continued to honor her after her death. On September 4, 1922, he opened the Eastman Theatre in Rochester, which included a chamber-music hall, Kilbourn Theater, dedicated to his mother's memory. At the Eastman House, he maintained a rose bush, using a cutting from her childhood home.

== Later years ==
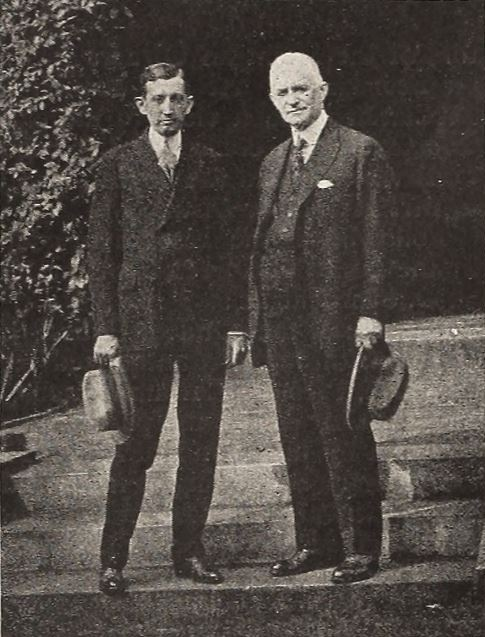
Eastman with Will H. Hays at the gardens of Eastman's home in Rochester, 1922

Eastman was a presidential elector in 1900 and 1916. In 1915, Eastman founded the Bureau of Municipal Research in Rochester to gather information and make government policy recommendations. The agency was later renamed the Center for Governmental Research and continues to carry out that mission. In 1924, Eastman and the bureau supported a referendum to change Rochester's government to a city manager system, which passed.

In 1920, Eastman established the Eastman Savings and Loan to provide financial services to Kodak employees. The institution was later rechartered as ESL Federal Credit Union.

In the 1920s, Eastman was involved in calendar reform and supported the 13-month per year International Fixed Calendar developed by Moses B. Cotsworth. On January 17, 1925, Eastman invited Cotsworth to his home; he had been introduced to Cotsworth's calendar by a mutual friend and was interested in the system. He secretly funded Cotsworth for a year and then openly supported him and the 13-month plan. Eastman took a major role in planning and financing the campaign for a new global calendar, and also headed the National Committee on Calendar Simplification in the United States, which was created at the behest of the League of Nations. Eastman supported Cotsworth's campaign until his death.

Eastman wrote several articles to promote the 13-month system, including "Problems of Calendar Improvement" in Scientific American and "The Importance of Calendar Reform to the Business World" in Nation's Business. By 1928, the Kodak Company implemented the calendar in its business bookkeeping, and continued to use it until 1989. He was chairman of the National Committee on Calendar Simplification. Although a conference was held at the League of Nations in 1931, with his death and the looming tensions of World War II, this calendar was dropped from consideration.

In 1925, Eastman gave up his daily management of Kodak and officially retired as president. He remained associated with the company in a business executive capacity, as the chairman of the board, until his death.

=== Philanthropy ===
During his lifetime, Eastman donated $100 million to various organizations, becoming one of the major philanthropists in the United States during his lifetime. His largest donations went to the University of Rochester and to the Massachusetts Institute of Technology to build their programs and facilities. Preferring to remain anonymous, he made donations under the alias "Mr. Smith". In 1918, he endowed the establishment of the Eastman School of Music at the University of Rochester, and in 1921, a school of medicine and dentistry there. In 1922, he founded the Rochester Philharmonic Orchestra, hiring its first music director Albert Coates. Figured for its value in 1932, the year of Eastman's death, $100 million is equivalent to more than $2 billion in 2022.

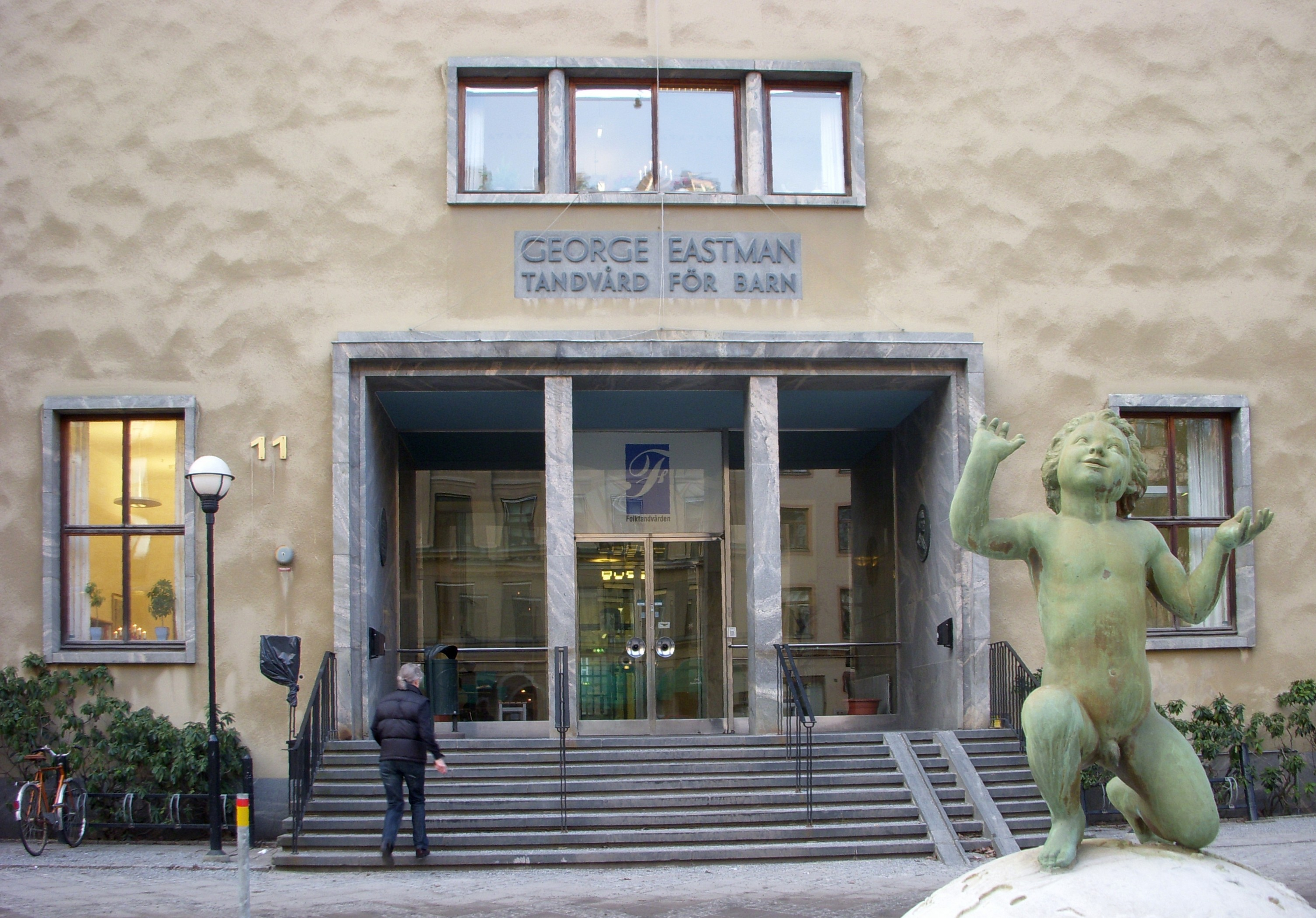
Eastmaninstitutet (The Eastman Institute) in Stockholm, Sweden

In 1915, Eastman provided funds for the establishment of the Eastman Dental Dispensary in Rochester. He donated £200,000 in 1926 to fund a dental clinic in London after being approached by the chairman of the Royal Free Hospital, George Riddell, 1st Baron Riddell. Donations of £50,000 each had been made by Lord Riddell and the Royal Free honorary treasurer. On November 20, 1931, the UCL Eastman Dental Institute opened in a ceremony attended by Neville Chamberlain, then Minister of Health, and the American ambassador to the UK. The clinic was incorporated into the Royal Free Hospital and was committed to providing dental care for disadvantaged children from central London. It is now a part of University College London. In 1929 he founded the George Eastman Visiting Professorship at University of Oxford, to be held each year by a different American scholar of the highest distinction. Eastman also funded Eastmaninstitutet, a dental care clinic for children opened in 1937 in Stockholm, Sweden.

=== Views on race ===
Marion Gleason, a close confidante of Eastman, later described his views on African Americans as "typical of his time – paternalistic, but strictly against social fraternization." Although he made generous donations to the Hampton Institute and Tuskegee Institute, becoming their largest donor in his era, he also upheld and reinforced the de facto segregation which existed in Rochester. Kodak hired virtually no black employees during Eastman's lifetime, and a 1939 commission of the New York State Legislature on living conditions of African Americans found that Kodak had only a single black employee. The Eastman Dental Dispensary also rejected black applicants, and the Eastman Theater restricted black patrons to its balcony. Eastman rejected several requests to meet with NAACP representatives, including a direct appeal from president Walter White in 1929.

From 1925 until his death, Eastman donated $10,000 per year to the American Eugenics Society (increasing the donation to $15,000 in 1932), a popular cause among many of the upper class when there were concerns about immigration and "race mixing".

== Infirmity and suicide ==
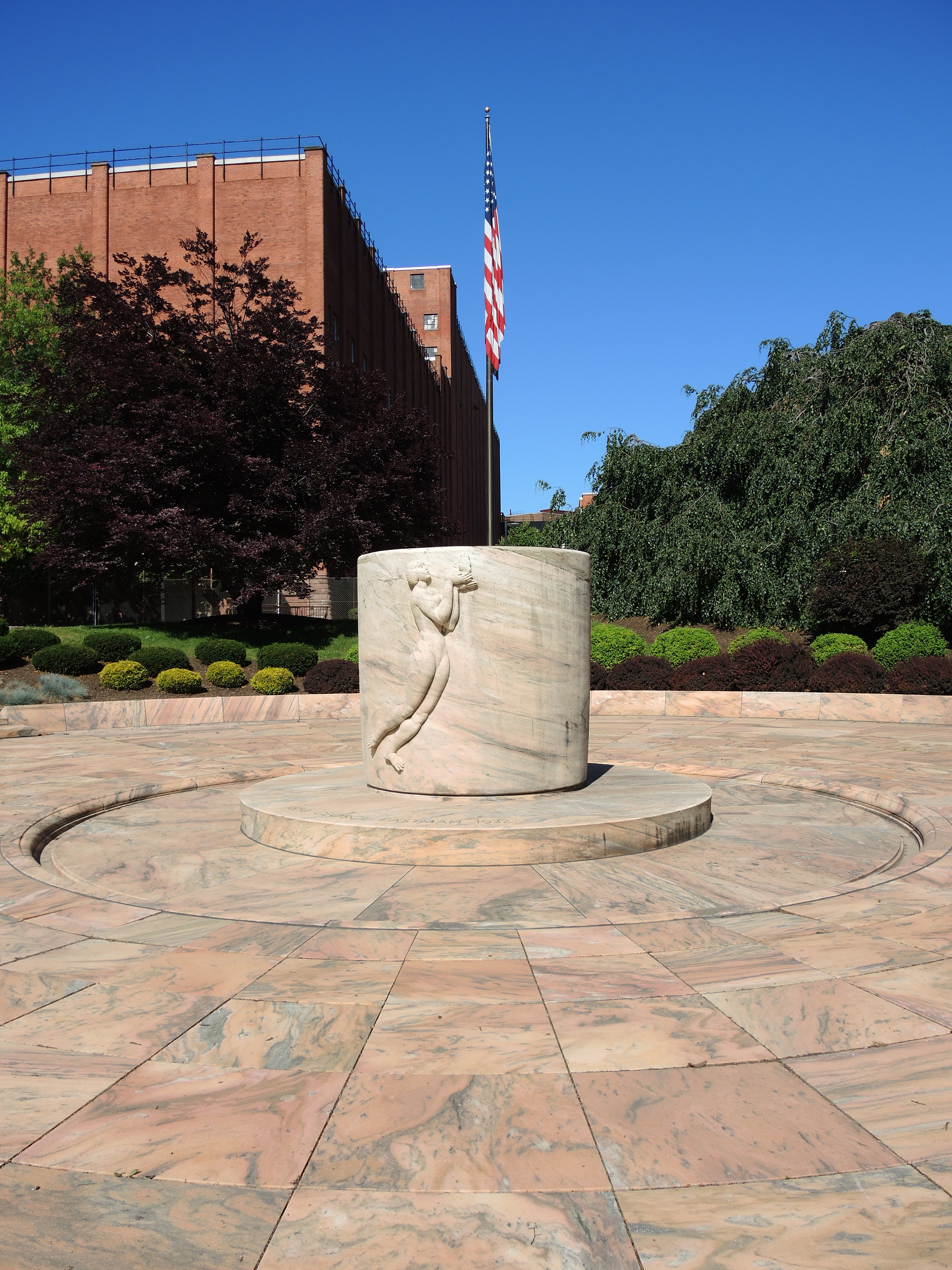
Memorial at Kodak Park in Rochester. Eastman's ashes lie beneath the Georgia marble monument

In his final two years, Eastman was in intense pain due to a disorder affecting his spine. He had trouble standing, and his walk became a slow shuffle. Today, it might be diagnosed as a form of degenerative disease such as disc herniations from trauma or age causing either painful nerve root compressions, or perhaps a type of lumbar spinal stenosis. Since his mother suffered during the final two years of her life in a wheelchair, she also may have had a spine condition, but that is uncertain. Only her uterine cancer and successful surgery are documented in her health history.

As a result of his pain, Eastman suffered from depression. On March 14, 1932, Eastman committed suicide with a single gunshot through the heart, leaving a note reading: "To my friends, my work is done – Why wait? GE."

Eastman's funeral was held at St. Paul's Episcopal Church in Rochester. His cremated remains were buried on the grounds of the company he founded, at what is now known as Eastman Business Park.

His entire estate was bequeathed to the University of Rochester.

== Legacy ==
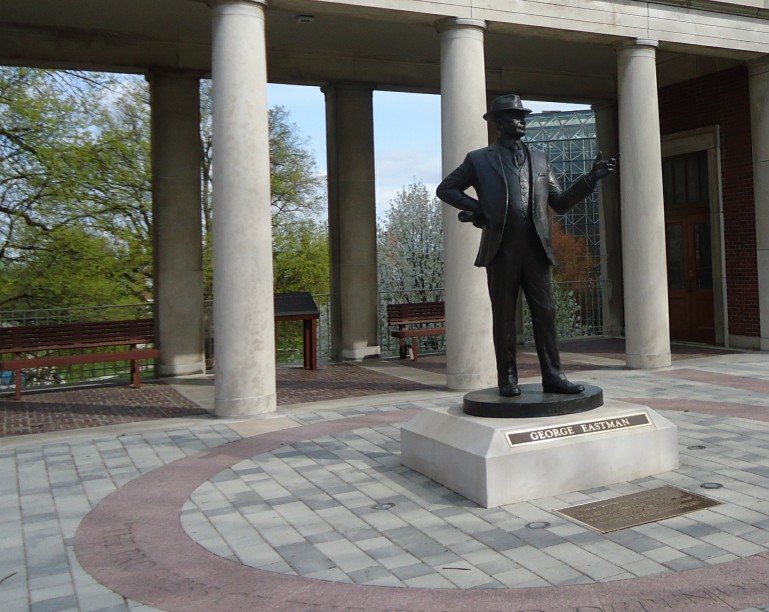
Statue of Eastman at the University of Rochester

Eastman disdained public notoriety and sought to tightly control his image. He was reluctant to share information in interviews, and on multiple occasions, both Eastman and Kodak blocked biographers from full access to his records. A definitive biography was finally published in 1996.

Eastman is the only person represented by two stars in the Film category in the Hollywood Walk of Fame, one on the north side of the 6800 block of Hollywood Boulevard and the other on the west side of the 1700 block of Vine Street. Both recognize the same achievement, that he developed bromide paper, which became a standard of the film industry.

The Eastman Quadrangle of the River Campus of the University of Rochester is named for Eastman. The Rochester Institute of Technology has a building dedicated to him, in recognition of his support and substantial donations. MIT installed a plaque of Eastman on one of the buildings he funded. (Students rub the nose of Eastman's image on the plaque for good luck.)

Eastman had built a mansion at 900 East Avenue in Rochester. Here, he entertained friends to dinner and held private music concerts. The University of Rochester used the mansion for various purposes for decades after his death. In 1949, it re-opened after having been adapted for use as the George Eastman House International Museum of Photography and Film. It has been designated a National Historic Landmark, and is now known as the George Eastman Museum.

Eastman's boyhood home was saved from destruction. It was restored to its state during his childhood and is displayed at the Genesee Country Village and Museum.

== Patents ==
- U.S. patent 226,503 "Method and Apparatus for Coating Plates", filed September 1879, issued April 1880.
- U.S. patent 306,470 "Photographic Film", filed May 10, 1884, issued October 14, 1884.
- U.S. patent 306,594 "Photographic Film", filed March 7, 1884, issued October 14, 1884.
- U.S. patent 317,049 (with William H. Walker) "Roll Holder for Photographic Films", filed August 1884, issued May 1885.
- U.S. patent 388,850 "Camera", filed March 1888, issued September 1888.
- Eastman licensed, then purchased U.S. patent 248,179 "Photographic Apparatus" (roll film holder), filed June 21, 1881, issued October 11, 1881, to David H. Houston.

== Honors and commemorations ==
- In 1930 he was awarded the American Institute of Chemists Gold Medal.
- In 1934, the George Eastman Monument at Kodak Park (now Eastman Business Park) was unveiled.
- On July 12, 1954, the U.S. Post Office issued a three-cent commemorative stamp marking the 100th anniversary of Eastman's birth, which was first issued in Rochester, New York.
- Also in 1954, to commemorate Eastman's 100th birthday, the University of Rochester erected a meridian marker near the center of Eastman Quadrangle on the campus of the University of Rochester using a gift from Eastman's former associate and university alumnus Charles F. Hutchison.
- In the fall of 2009, a statue of Eastman was erected approximately 60 feet (18 m) north by northeast of the meridian marker on the Eastman Quadrangle of the University of Rochester.
- In 1966, the George Eastman House was designated a National Historic Landmark.
- The auditorium at the Dave C. Swalm School of Chemical Engineering at Mississippi State University is named for Eastman, in recognition of his inspiration to Swalm.
- In 1968, Eastman was inducted into the International Photography Hall of Fame and Museum.

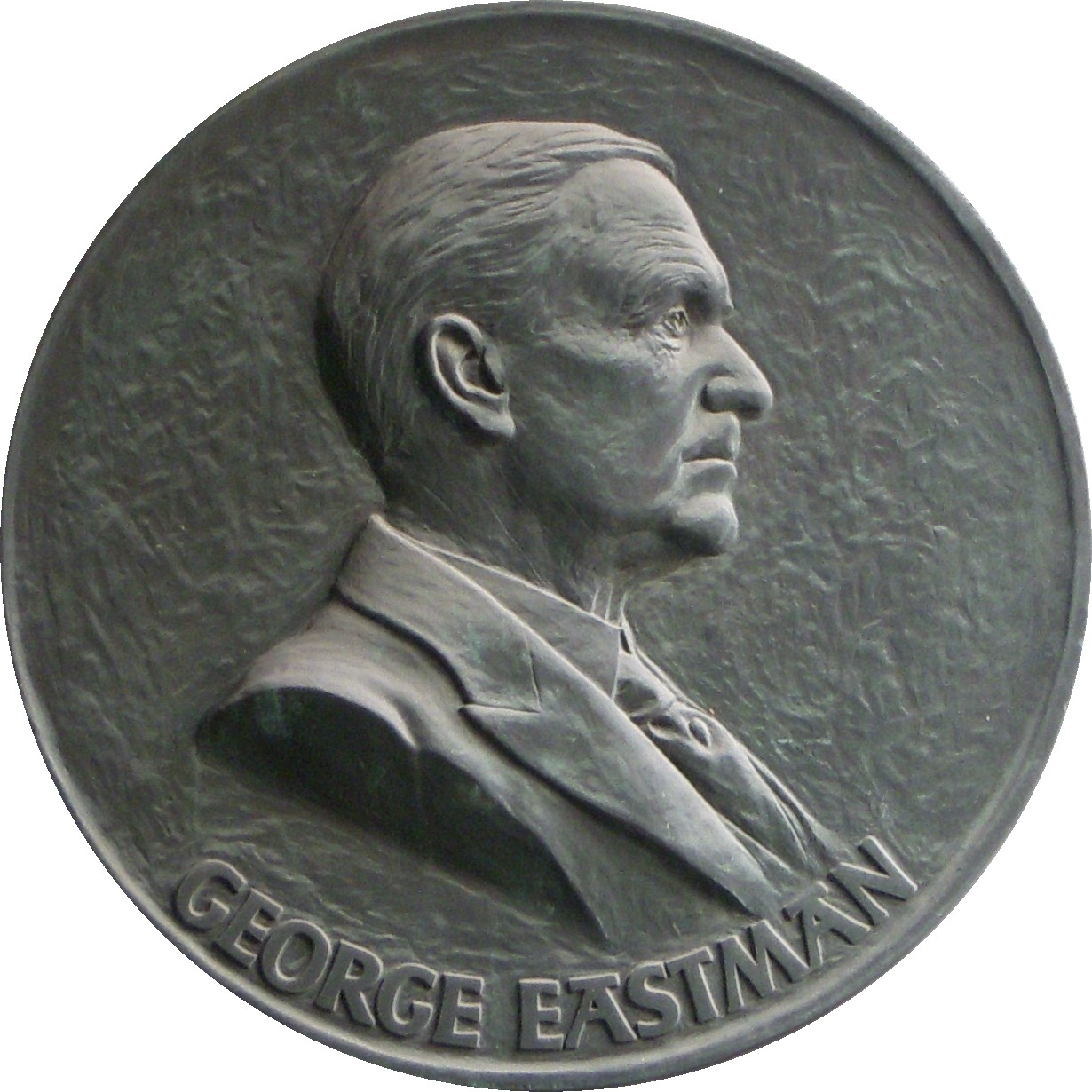
Medallion depicting Eastman hanging in the entrance hall of Eastmaninstitutet

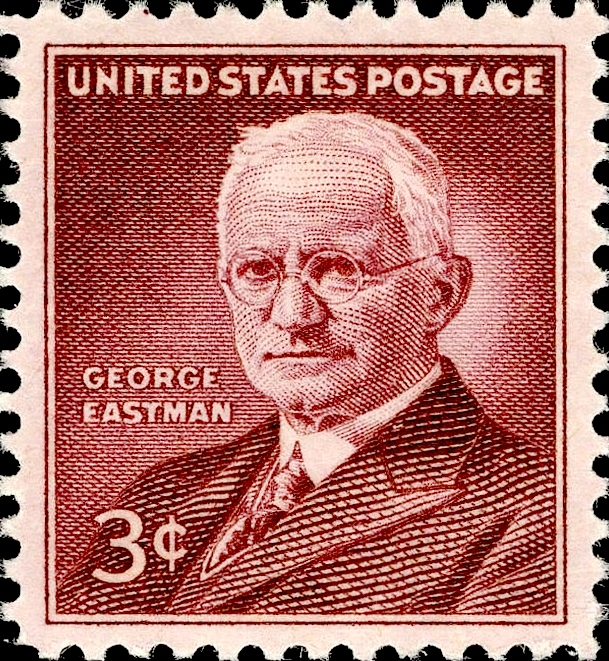
George Eastman commemorative issue, 1954

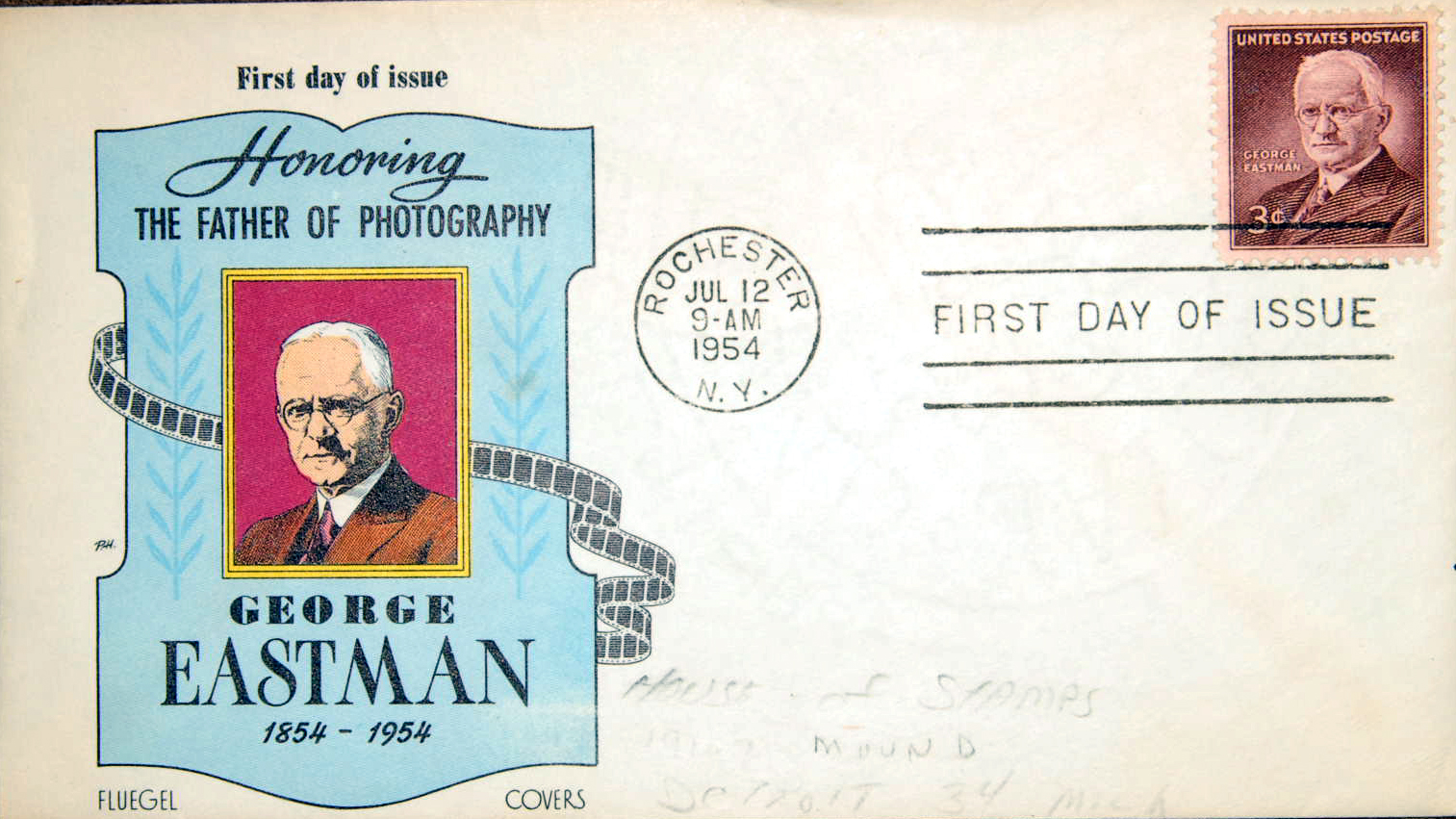
A first day cover honoring Eastman, 1954

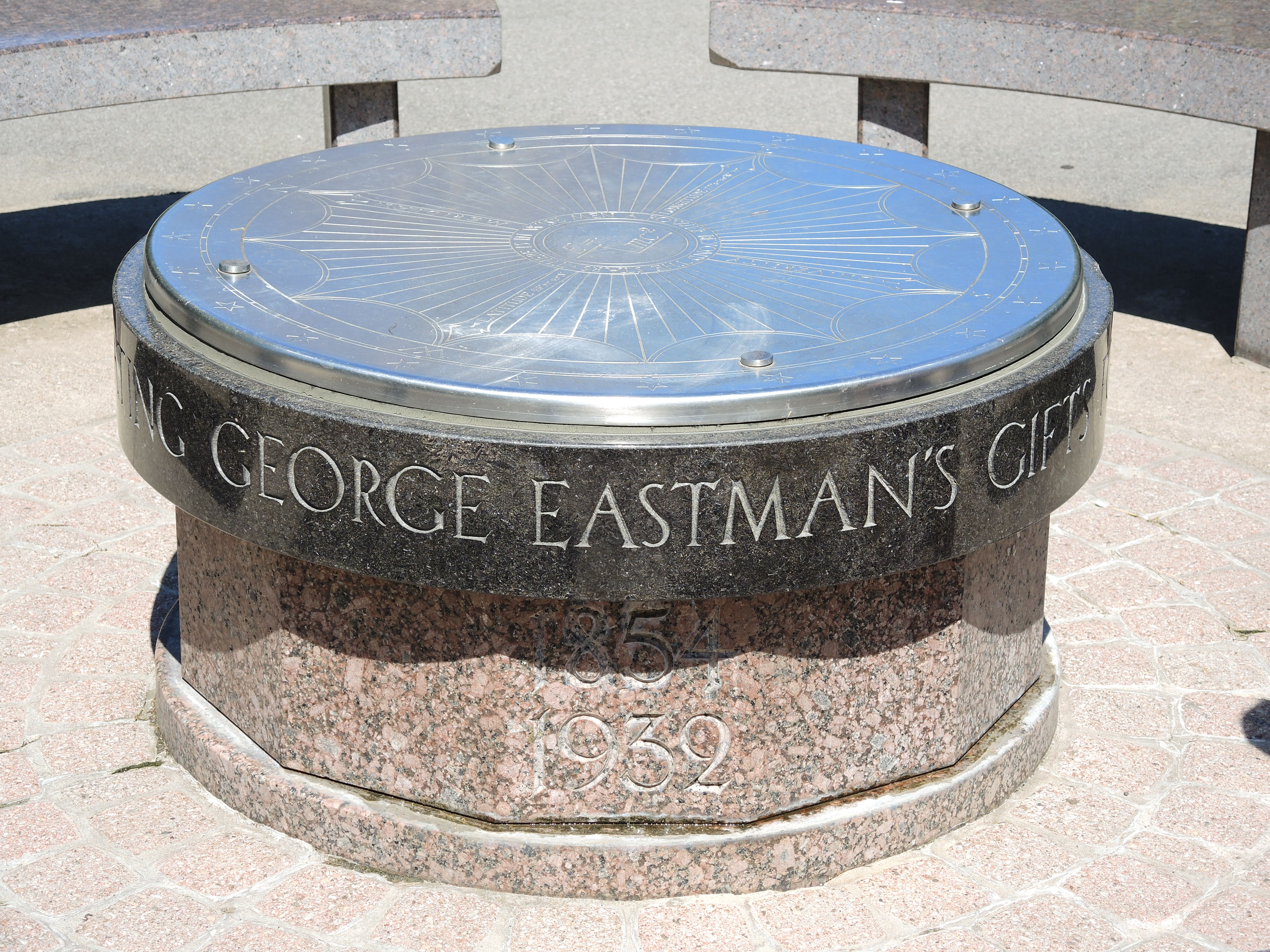
Meridian marker and Eastman memorial

== Representation in other media ==
- PBS American Experience produced an episode entitled The Wizard of Photography: The Story of George Eastman and How He Transformed Photography. It first aired on May 22, 2000.
- Several short documentary films about his life have been made and shown at the George Eastman Museum in Rochester.

== See also ==
- Stanley Motor Carriage Company

Business positions
New office	Treasurer of Eastman Kodak; 1884–1921	Succeeded by
Vacant Title last held by Henry A. Strong	President of Eastman Kodak; 1921 – April 7, 1925	Succeeded by William G. Stuber
Awards and achievements
Preceded by Raymond Poincaré	Cover of Time magazine March 31, 1924	Succeeded by George V
