= H. E. Eastman =

American politician (1819–1898)

3rd Mayor of Green Bay, Wisconsin
- In office April 1856 – April 1858
- Preceded by: Francis X. Desnoyers
- Succeeded by: Burley Follett

Personal details
- Born: March 25, 1819 Maine, U.S.
- Died: March 22, 1898 (aged 78) Benton Harbor, Michigan, U.S.
- Resting place: Woodlawn Cemetery, Green Bay, Wisconsin
- Spouse: Elizabeth Margaret Arndt (m. 1843–1898)
- Children: 6
- Parents: Samuel Eastman (father); Jane (Hitchcock) Eastman (mother)
- Relatives: Ben C. Eastman (brother); John A. Eastman (brother); John Penn Arndt (father-in-law); Benjamin Franklin Eastman (uncle)

Military service
- Allegiance: United States
- Branch/service: United States Volunteers; Union Army
- Years of service: 1861–1864
- Rank: Lt. Colonel, USV
- Unit: 2nd Reg. Wis. Vol. Cavalry
- Battles/wars: American Civil War

Harry Eugene Eastman (March 25, 1819 – March 22, 1898) was an American lawyer, businessman, and Wisconsin pioneer. He was the 3rd mayor of Green Bay, Wisconsin, and served as a Union Army cavalry officer during the American Civil War. In historical documents, his name is often abbreviated as H. E. Eastman.

== Biography ==
Harry Eugene Eastman was born on March 25, 1819, in Maine and lived for several years in Maine's Franklin County, where he became a lawyer. In 1840, he came west to the Wisconsin Territory and settled at Green Bay. That year, he formed a law partnership with Morgan Lewis Martin, and subsequently partnered with Timothy O. Howe. After 1846, he began dealing in real estate, and was successful for several years.

Politically, he became involved with the Whig Party. He was chairman of the Wisconsin delegation to the 1848 Whig National Convention, where his delegation consistently supported Senator Henry Clay for President. Later that year, Eastman stood for election to the Wisconsin State Senate in the 1st State Senate district, but was defeated by Democrat Lemuel Goodell.

After Green Bay incorporated as a city, Eastman won election as the 3rd mayor of the city in 1856 and was subsequently re-elected to another one-year term in 1857.

Leaving office, Eastman purchased a line of steamboats to operate a ferry line between Green Bay and Buffalo, New York. His work was interrupted by the American Civil War. In the first year of the war, he volunteered for service and was commissioned major of the 2nd battalion of the 2nd Wisconsin Cavalry Regiment. The 2nd Wisconsin Cavalry was involved in heavy campaigning in the western theater of the war, and assisted in the Siege of Vicksburg in 1863. Major Eastman was promoted to lieutenant colonel in April 1864, but was forced to resign due to illness just two months later. After returning to Wisconsin, he spent several weeks confined to his bed.

In his later years, he relocated to Benton Harbor, Michigan, where he died in 1898.

== Personal life and family ==
Eastman married Elizabeth Margaret Arndt on March 3, 1843. Arndt was the daughter of John Penn Arndt, a prominent early settler of Green Bay. The Eastman marriage produced six children.

Political offices
Preceded by Francis X. Desnoyers	Mayor of Green Bay, Wisconsin; April 1856 – April 1858	Succeeded by Burley Follett
