= 2nd Wisconsin Cavalry Regiment =

Union Army cavalry regiment

- Flag of Wisconsin
- Active: September 1, 1861 – November 15, 1865
- Country: United States
- Allegiance: Union
- Branch: Cavalry
- Size: Regiment
- Engagements: American Civil War: Battle of Prairie Grove; Siege of Vicksburg; Siege of Jackson; Battle of Egypt Station

Commanders
- Colonel: Cadwallader C. Washburn
- Colonel: Thomas Stephens
- Lt. Col.: Levi Sterling
- Lt. Col.: H. Eugene Eastman
- Major: George N. Richmond
- Lt. Col.: Nicholas H. Dale

The 2nd Wisconsin Cavalry Regiment was a volunteer cavalry regiment that served in the Union Army in the western theater of the American Civil War.

== Service ==
The 2nd Wisconsin Cavalry was organized at Milwaukee, Wisconsin, between December 30, 1861, and March 10, 1862. The regiment was divided for a significant portion of their service, with the 1st battalion (companies A, D, G, and K), remaining in Missouri from June 1862 until September 1864, when they rejoined the other two battalions at Vicksburg. While separated, the 1st battalion served as a private bodyguard for general Egbert B. Brown in Missouri, and were then assigned to Francis J. Herron and participated in the Battle of Prairie Grove, and were subsequently an escort for general William W. Orme.

The regiment achieved veteran status in March 1864.

About a fifth of the regiment mustered out of federal service at Memphis, Tennessee, on July 3, 1865, comprising men whose term was set to expire on or before October 1, 1865. The remainder of the regiment was mustered out at Austin, Texas, on November 15, 1865, and disbanded at Madison, Wisconsin, on December 14, 1865.

== Total strength and casualties ==
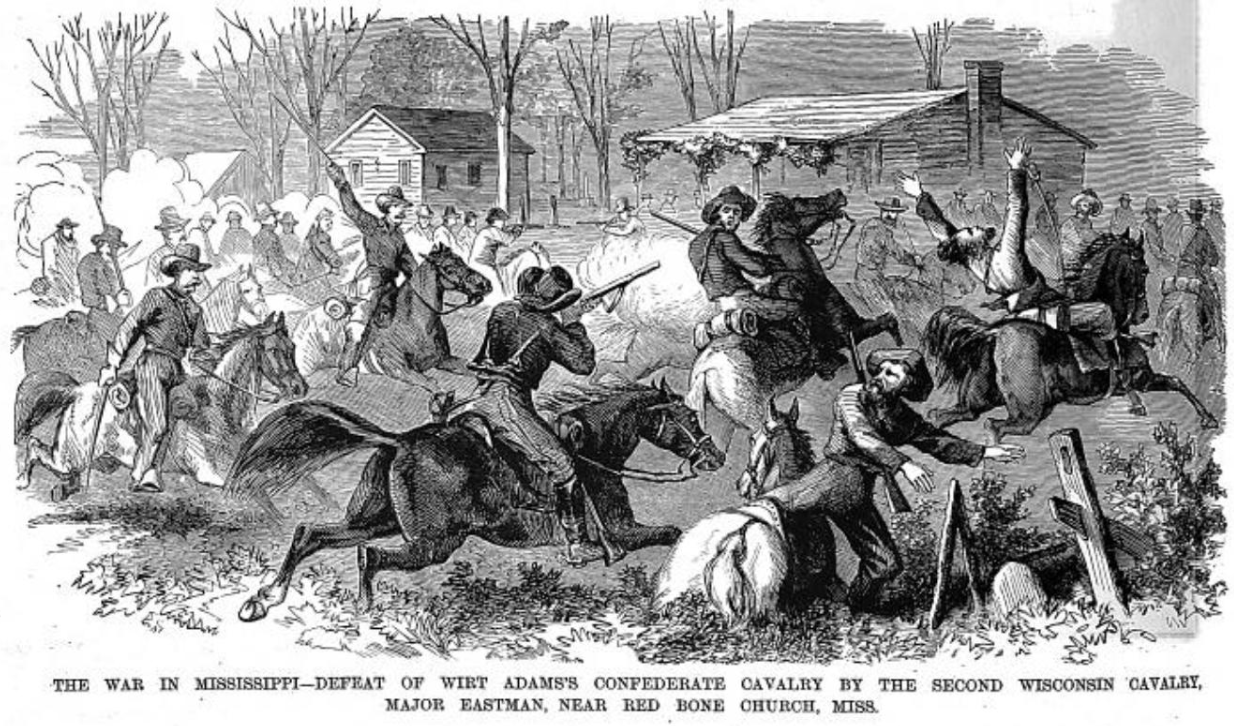
Depiction of the 2nd Wisconsin clashing with Adam's Mississippi Cavalry at Red Bone Church, Mississippi, April 21, 1863

The 2nd Wisconsin Cavalry initially recruited 1,127 officers and men. An additional 998 men were recruited as replacements, for a total of 2,125 men.

The regiment suffered 24 enlisted men killed or died from wounds in action, and 4 officers and 284 enlisted men who died of disease, for a total of 312 fatalities.

== Commanders ==
- Colonel Cadwallader C. Washburn (October 10, 1861 – June 5, 1862) was promoted to brigadier general and later rose to major general. After the war, he became a U.S. congressman and the 11th governor of Wisconsin. He is also considered one of the founders of General Mills.
- Colonel Thomas Stephens (August 7, 1862 – July 3, 1865) began the war as lieutenant colonel and was detached to training and drilling duty at Springfield, Missouri. He returned to the regiment and was promoted to colonel after Washburn's promotion to brigadier. He was absent due to illness in the Summer of 1864, and was then court-martialed over a controversy in November 1864. He mustered out in July 1865. Before the war, he had been inspector general of the Wisconsin militia. Before emigrating to the United States, he had served in the Queen's Life Guard in the British Army.
  - Lieutenant Colonel Levi Sterling (June 5, 1862 – August 7, 1862; February 1863 – May 1863) was major of the 3rd battalion and commanded the regiment as a major during his first stint, after Washburn was promoted and while Stephens was absent on detached duty, and then commanded the regiment as lieutenant colonel when Stephens was assigned to command the brigade. He resigned in June 1863. Before the war, he had served several terms in the Wisconsin legislature.
  - Lieutenant Colonel H. Eugene Eastman (May 1863 – June 10, 1863; November 1863 – March 1864) was major of the 2nd battalion and commanded the regiment as major during his first stint, when Stephens was acting with the brigade and Sterling was absent. On his second stint, he was in command as major again when Stephens was sent to Wisconsin for recruitment. Eastman was captured while visiting a local family in Mississippi and was later ransomed. He was dismissed in July 1864. Before the war, he had served as mayor of Green Bay, Wisconsin.
  - Major George N. Richmond (May 1864 – November 1864) was major of the 3rd battalion and commanded the regiment as major while Stephens was in command of all cavalry at Vicksburg after Eastman left. He was dismissed from service in November 1864 due to some controversy. Earlier in the war, he had been captain of Co. E. After the war he served in the Wisconsin legislature and was mayor of Appleton, Wisconsin.
- Lieutenant Colonel Nicholas H. Dale (November 1864 – December 1864; July 3, 1865 – November 15, 1865) was major of the 1st battalion and commanded the regiment as major during his first stint, when Stephens was being court-martialed. He was in command again after Stephens and about 200 others mustered out of service in 1865. He was designated for promotion to colonel but was never mustered at that rank. Earlier in the war he was captain of Co. G.

== Notable people ==
- Carmi W. Beach was captain of Co. E, after rising through the enlisted ranks in that company. After the war he served as a Wisconsin state representative.
- Albert Webb Bishop was captain of Co. B, resigned to accept appointment as lieutenant colonel of the 1st Arkansas Cavalry Regiment and went on to serve as a public official and University president in Arkansas.
- Napoleon Boardman, father of Charles R. Boardman, was 1st lieutenant in Co. A and later detailed as chief of ordinance on the staff of General William Rosecrans and rose to the rank of colonel.
- Benjamin Brisbane, son of William Henry Brisbane Sr., was first lieutenant of Co. I, but resigned after a year to accept a commission in the 1st United States Colored Infantry Regiment.
- William Henry Brisbane Jr., son of William Henry Brisbane Sr., was second lieutenant of Co. I, but resigned after only a few months service.
- William Henry Brisbane Sr. was chaplain of the regiment. Before the war, he was an abolitionist activist who freed a number of enslaved people from the south and settled them in the north.
- Charles L. Catlin was enlisted in Co. D and served through the entire war. After the war he served as a Wisconsin legislator.
- Samuel A. Cook was enlisted in Co. A for the final months of the war. After the war he served as a U.S. congressman.
- Melvin Grigsby was enlisted in Co. C and was a prisoner of war. After the war he became the 3rd Attorney General of South Dakota and later served as colonel of the 3rd U.S. Cavalry Regiment during the Spanish–American War.
- William J. Hoynes was enlisted in Co. D. Earlier in the war he served in the 20th Wisconsin Infantry Regiment and was wounded at the Battle of Prairie Grove. After the war he was the first dean of the law department at the University of Notre Dame.
- Daniel Mears was second lieutenant of Co. D, but resigned after only a few months. Before the war, he served in the Wisconsin Senate.
- Edward S. Minor was enlisted in Co. E and later promoted to sergeant. Near the end of the war he was commissioned as 1st lieutenant of the company. After the war he served as a Wisconsin legislator and U.S. congressman.
- William H. Morgan was adjutant of the regiment, and later adjutant of the brigade and the division. After the war he received an honorary brevet to brigadier general.
- Sewall A. Phillips was enlisted in Co. A. After the war he served as a Wisconsin legislator.
- Reuben B. Showalter was enlisted in Co. C for the last year of the war. After the war he served as a Wisconsin legislator.
- Horatio H. Virgin, son of Noah Virgin, was adjutant of the 1st battalion and later became lieutenant colonel of the 33rd Wisconsin Infantry Regiment and received an honorary brevet to colonel.

== See also ==
- List of Wisconsin Civil War units
- Wisconsin in the American Civil War
