= 2024 F1600 Championship Series =

14th season of the F1600 Championship Series

2024 F1600 season

Season
- Races: 21
- Start date: March 21
- End date: August 18

Awards
- Drivers' champion: (United States) Mateo Naranjo
- Manufacturers' Cup: (France) Mygale

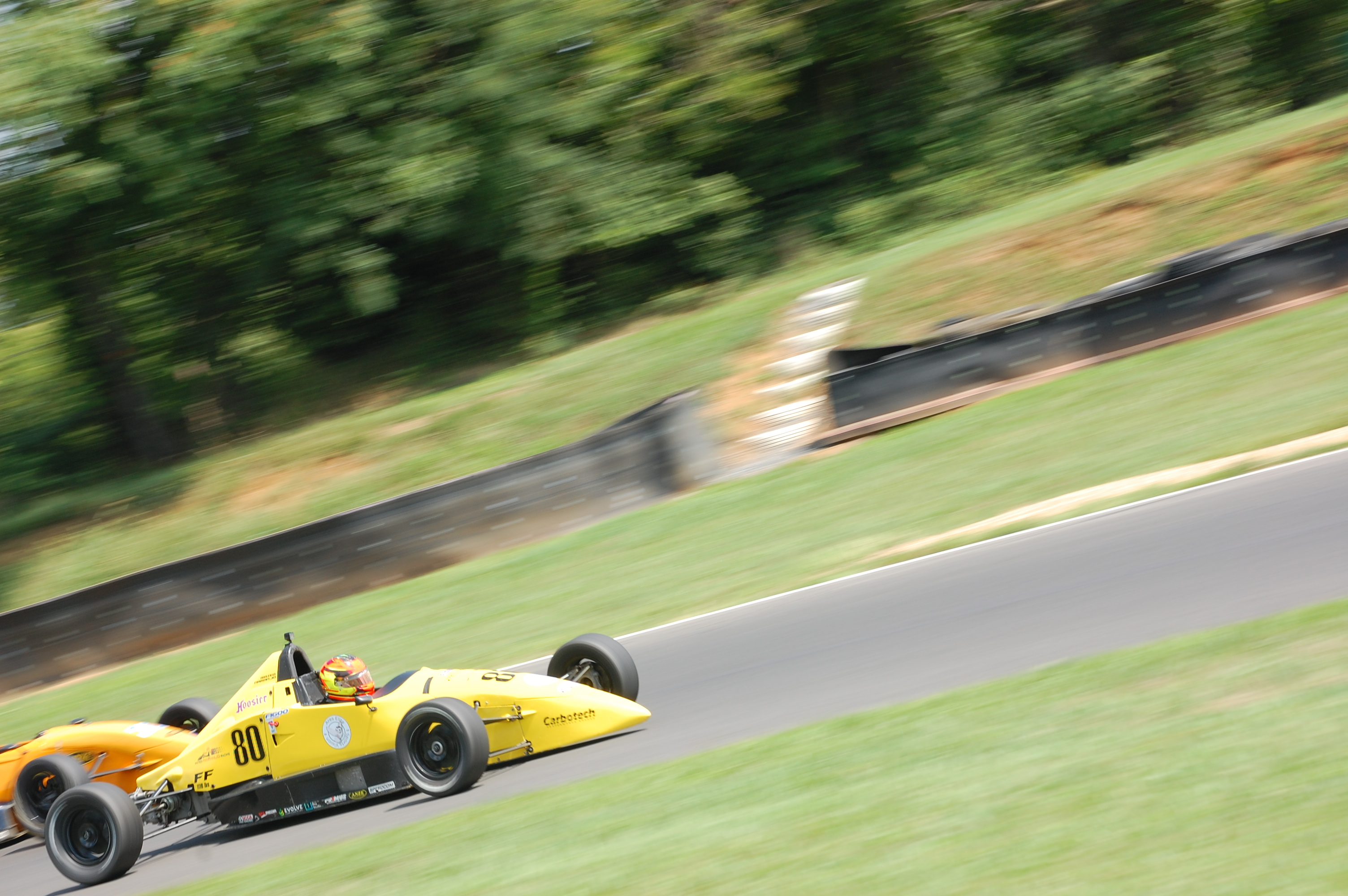
Sebastian Mateo Naranjo won the 2024 championship driving for Team Pelfrey.

The 2024 F1600 Championship Series season was the thirteenth season of the F1600 Championship Series.

The prior year's winner was Porter Aiken from Chillout Motorsports.

The national F1600 Championship Series doesn't have the second 'F' because it uses Honda engines instead of Ford engines. In 2024, the series took place over seven rounds. Naranjo from Team Pelfrey won the championship in one of the latest cars on the track, even though it is already ten years old. Timothy Steele came in second place. Naranjo didn't lose any races in the season opener at Road Atlanta and the three races in Pittsburgh. In contrast, Steele managed to win only once during the 19-race season at New Jersey Motorsports Park.

Thomas Schrage, who finished on the podium in USF2000, won all three races at Mid-Ohio. After that, Cooper Shipman, a second-year driver from Iron Rock Motorsports, won a race. Then, Naranjo celebrated two victories at Lime Rock. He increased his total wins to eight by winning once at Road America and once at NJMP. The other two races at Road America were won by USF2000 driver Ayrton Houk.

Jack Sullivan, a fellow scholar from Team USA in 2023, won the first race of the Summit Point finale, while Shipman took first place in the second race.

== Drivers and teams ==
Pro Division
Team/Sponsor	No.	Drivers	Class	Rounds	Chassis	Engine
(Canada) Rice Race Prep	01	(United States) Michael Dowden	R	1–15	Mygale	Honda
(Canada) Rice Race Prep	02	(Australia) Ayush Pasricha	R	1–3	Mygale	Honda
(Canada) Rice Race Prep	02	(United States) Thomas Schrage		4–6	Mygale	Honda
(Canada) Rice Race Prep	02	(United States) Scott Oliver	R	10–12	Mygale	Honda
(Canada) Rice Race Prep	02	(United States) Ayrton Houk		13–15	Mygale	Honda
(Canada) Rice Race Prep	03	(United States) Simon Sikes		1–3	Mygale	Honda
Rehm Racing	03	(United States) Greg Peluso	M	10–12, 19–21	Van Diemen	
Rehm Racing	08	(United States) Greg Peluso	M	1–3	Van Diemen	
Rehm Racing	12	(United States) Bob Reid	M	All	Spectrum	
CT Motorsports	41	(United States) Karsten Defonce		1–21	Ray FF	Honda
CT Motorsports	45	(United States) Dillion Defonce		1–12	Ray FF	
CT Motorsports	45	(United States) Jack Sullivan		19–21	Ray FF	
(United States) Lee Racing	0	(United States) Jonathan Lee		1–3	Swift	Honda
(United States) Lee Racing	1	(United States) Jonathan Lee		4–6	Swift	Ford
(United States) Raceworks	11	(United States) Christopher Kierce		1–3, 10–12	Spectrum	Honda
(United States) Raceworks	48	(United States) John Kierce		10–12	Piper	
(United States) K-Hill Motorsports	031	(United States) Jackson Tovo		All	Mygale	Honda
(United States) K-Hill Motorsports	13	(United States) Ethan Tovo		16–18	Spectrum	Honda
(United States) K-Hill Motorsports	13	(United States) Ethan Tovo		1–15, 19–21	Mygale	Honda
(United States) K-Hill Motorsports	76	(United States) Ava Hanssen	R	All	Mygale	Honda
(United States) K-Hill Motorsports	113	(United States) Joseph Tovo	G M	13–15	Spectrum	Honda
Dole Racing	4	(United States) John P Dole	R	16–18	Mygale	
Dole Racing	8	(United States) John Dole	G M	16–18	Ray FF	
(United States) Team Pelfrey	7	(United States) Timothy Steele		1–3	Van Diemen	Honda
(United States) Team Pelfrey	80	(United States) Sebastian Mateo Naranjo		All	Mygale	Honda
Partstop	2	(United States) Mike Scanlan	M	4–12, 16–18	Spectrum	
(United States) Auriana Racing	3	(United States) Joe Colasacco	M	1–9, 16–18	Van Diemen	
(United States) TTO Motorsports	5	(United States) John Thompson	R M	1–3, 7–9	Piper	
Steele Carreras	7	(United States) Timothy Steele		4–21	Van Diemen	Honda
Aero Metals	9	(United States) Robert Stowell	M	4–9, 13–21	Spectrum	
Steel Services	11	(United States) Tom Schwietz	G M	16–21	Piper	
	18	(United States) Gary Gecelter	M	7–9	Spectrum	
(United States) Drivers Services	18	(United States) Gary Gecelter	M	10–12, 16–18	Spectrum	
Shady Hill Clayworks	21	(United States) Dave Petzko	M	1–9, 13–15, 19–21	Spectrum	
Cahan Racing Team	22	(United States) Ayrton Cahan	R	All	Van Diemen	Honda
(United States) AntiSpeed	26	(United States) Charles Anti		10–12	Van Diemen	Honda
Practical Precision Engineering	30	(United States) Will Velkoff		7–12, 16–21	Van Diemen	
AJMoto	31	(United States) Scott Rubenzer	M	1–6, 10–15, 19–21	Spectrum	Honda
Red Arrow Racing	32	(United States) Trevor Russell		4–6, 13–15	Ray FF	Honda
Cordova Racing	42	(United States) Joe Parsons	M	19–21	Spectrum	
Kingham Racing	47	(United States) Phil Kingham	M	1–6, 10–15, 19–21	Spectrum	
Bob Gross Racing	62	(United States) Robert Gross	M	4–6	Piper	
IronRock Motorsports	14	(United States) Cooper Shipman		4–12, 16–21	Piper	
IronRock Motorsports	70	(United States) Cooper Shipman		1–3	Piper	
DBM Racing	72	(United States) Steve Oseth	M	16–21	Citation	
RaceDog	75	(United States) Jay Messenger	M	13–15	Van Diemen	Honda
Kelly Moss Inc.	81	(United States) Theodore Burns		13–15	Piper	
ThermaMasters	85	(United States) David Livingston Jr.	M	1–6, 10–15	Spectrum	Honda
Bulzacchelli Racing	98	(United States) Michael Bulzacchelli		10–12	Piper	Honda
FRP F1600 Championship Series 2024

Icon	Class
M	Masters
R	Rookie
G	Guest

== Schedule ==
Rd.	Date	Track	Location
1	March 21–24	Road Atlanta	(Georgia (U.S. state)) Braselton, Georgia
2	March 21–24	Road Atlanta	(Georgia (U.S. state)) Braselton, Georgia
3	March 21–24	Road Atlanta	(Georgia (U.S. state)) Braselton, Georgia
4	April 26–28	Mid-Ohio Sports Car Course	Lexington, Ohio
5	April 26–28	Mid-Ohio Sports Car Course	Lexington, Ohio
6	April 26–28	Mid-Ohio Sports Car Course	Lexington, Ohio
7	May 24–27	Lime Rock Park	Salisbury, Connecticut
8	May 24–27	Lime Rock Park	Salisbury, Connecticut
9	May 24–27	Lime Rock Park	Salisbury, Connecticut
10	June 7–9	Pittsburgh International Race Complex	Wampum, Pennsylvania
11	June 7–9	Pittsburgh International Race Complex	Wampum, Pennsylvania
12	June 7–9	Pittsburgh International Race Complex	Wampum, Pennsylvania
13	June 28–30	Road America	Plymouth, Wisconsin
14	June 28–30	Road America	Plymouth, Wisconsin
15	June 28–30	Road America	Plymouth, Wisconsin
16	July 26–28	New Jersey Motorsports Park	Millville, New Jersey
17	July 26–28	New Jersey Motorsports Park	Millville, New Jersey
18	July 26–28	New Jersey Motorsports Park	Millville, New Jersey
19	August 16–18	Summit Point Motorsports Park	Summit Point, West Virginia
20	August 16–18	Summit Point Motorsports Park	Summit Point, West Virginia
21	August 16–18	Summit Point Motorsports Park	Summit Point, West Virginia
References: Formula Race Promotions Confirms 2024 Dates and Locations

== Results and performance summaries ==
Round	Circuit	Location	Date	Pole position	Fastest lap	Winning driver	Masters class winner	Supporting
1	Road Atlanta	(Georgia (U.S. state)) Braselton, Georgia	March 23	(United States) Trevor Russell	Race cancelled (Note: Road Atlanta Race 1 - Cancelled, No Points)			F2000 Championship Series; North American F1000 Championship; Atlantic Championship; International GT; SVRA Sprint Series; Trans-Am Series; Prototype Sprint Series Association; Ginetta Challenge Race Series
2	Road Atlanta	(Georgia (U.S. state)) Braselton, Georgia	March 23		(United States) Joe Colasacco	(United States) Sebastian Mateo Naranjo	(United States) Scott Rubenzer	F2000 Championship Series; North American F1000 Championship; Atlantic Championship; International GT; SVRA Sprint Series; Trans-Am Series; Prototype Sprint Series Association; Ginetta Challenge Race Series
3	Road Atlanta	(Georgia (U.S. state)) Braselton, Georgia	March 24		(United States) Simon Sikes	(United States) Sebastian Mateo Naranjo	(United States) David Livingston Jr.	F2000 Championship Series; North American F1000 Championship; Atlantic Championship; International GT; SVRA Sprint Series; Trans-Am Series; Prototype Sprint Series Association; Ginetta Challenge Race Series
4	Mid-Ohio Sports Car Course	Lexington, Ohio	April 27	(United States) Cooper Shipman	(United States) Thomas Schrage	(United States) Thomas Schrage	(United States) Joe Colasacco	F2000 Championship Series; North American F1000 Championship; Atlantic Championship; SVRA Sprint Series
5	Mid-Ohio Sports Car Course	Lexington, Ohio	April 28		(United States) Thomas Schrage	(United States) Thomas Schrage	(United States) Joe Colasacco	F2000 Championship Series; North American F1000 Championship; Atlantic Championship; SVRA Sprint Series
6	Mid-Ohio Sports Car Course	Lexington, Ohio	April 28		(United States) Thomas Schrage	(United States) Thomas Schrage	(United States) Joe Colasacco	F2000 Championship Series; North American F1000 Championship; Atlantic Championship; SVRA Sprint Series
7	Lime Rock Park	Salisbury, Connecticut	May 25	(United States) Jackson Tovo	(United States) Ethan Tovo	(United States) Cooper Shipman	(United States) Joe Colasacco	F2000 Championship Series; SVRA Sprint Series; International GT; Trans-Am Series; Ginetta Challenge Race Series
8	Lime Rock Park	Salisbury, Connecticut	May 27		(United States) Sebastian Mateo Naranjo	(United States) Sebastian Mateo Naranjo	(United States) Joe Colasacco	F2000 Championship Series; SVRA Sprint Series; International GT; Trans-Am Series; Ginetta Challenge Race Series
9	Lime Rock Park	Salisbury, Connecticut	May 27		(United States) Jackson Tovo	(United States) Sebastian Mateo Naranjo	(United States) Joe Colasacco	F2000 Championship Series; SVRA Sprint Series; International GT; Trans-Am Series; Ginetta Challenge Race Series
10	Pittsburgh International Race Complex	Wampum, Pennsylvania	June 8	(United States) Sebastian Mateo Naranjo	(United States) Sebastian Mateo Naranjo	(United States) Sebastian Mateo Naranjo	(United States) Scott Rubenzer	F2000 Championship Series; Atlantic Championship; SVRA Sprint Series; International GT; Trans-Am Series
11	Pittsburgh International Race Complex	Wampum, Pennsylvania	June 9		(United States) Sebastian Mateo Naranjo	(United States) Sebastian Mateo Naranjo	(United States) Scott Rubenzer	F2000 Championship Series; Atlantic Championship; SVRA Sprint Series; International GT; Trans-Am Series
12	Pittsburgh International Race Complex	Wampum, Pennsylvania	June 9		(United States) Sebastian Mateo Naranjo	(United States) Sebastian Mateo Naranjo	(United States) Scott Rubenzer	F2000 Championship Series; Atlantic Championship; SVRA Sprint Series; International GT; Trans-Am Series
13	Road America	Plymouth, Wisconsin	June 29	(United States) Trevor Russell	(United States) Karsten Defonce	(United States) Sebastian Mateo Naranjo	(United States) Scott Rubenzer	F2000 Championship Series; North American F1000 Championship; Atlantic Championship; Trans-Am Series; International GT; Prototype Sprint Series Association; SVRA Sprint Series
14	Road America	Plymouth, Wisconsin	June 30		(United States) Ethan Tovo	(United States) Ayrton Houk	(United States) Scott Rubenzer	F2000 Championship Series; North American F1000 Championship; Atlantic Championship; Trans-Am Series; International GT; Prototype Sprint Series Association; SVRA Sprint Series
15	Road America	Plymouth, Wisconsin	June 30		(United States) Sebastian Mateo Naranjo	(United States) Ayrton Houk	(United States) David Livingston Jr.	F2000 Championship Series; North American F1000 Championship; Atlantic Championship; Trans-Am Series; International GT; Prototype Sprint Series Association; SVRA Sprint Series
16	New Jersey Motorsports Park	Millville, New Jersey	July 27	(United States) Karsten Defonce	(United States) Sebastian Mateo Naranjo	(United States) Sebastian Mateo Naranjo	(United States) Joe Colasacco	F2000 Championship Series; Atlantic Championship; Formula Regional Americas Championship; Ligier JS F4 Series; Formula 4 United States Championship; SVRA Sprint Series
17	New Jersey Motorsports Park	Millville, New Jersey	July 28		(United States) Sebastian Mateo Naranjo	(United States) Timothy Steele	(United States) Joe Colasacco	F2000 Championship Series; Atlantic Championship; Formula Regional Americas Championship; Ligier JS F4 Series; Formula 4 United States Championship; SVRA Sprint Series
18	New Jersey Motorsports Park	Millville, New Jersey	July 28		(United States) Karsten Defonce	(United States) Karsten Defonce	(United States) Joe Colasacco	F2000 Championship Series; Atlantic Championship; Formula Regional Americas Championship; Ligier JS F4 Series; Formula 4 United States Championship; SVRA Sprint Series
19	Summit Point Motorsports Park	Summit Point, West Virginia	August 17	(United States) Jack Sullivan	(United States) Karsten Defonce	(United States) Jack Sullivan	(United States) Scott Rubenzer	F2000 Championship Series; North American F1000 Championship; Atlantic Championship; SVRA Sprint Series
20	Summit Point Motorsports Park	Summit Point, West Virginia	August 18		(United States) Jack Sullivan	(United States) Cooper Shipman	(United States) Bob Reid	F2000 Championship Series; North American F1000 Championship; Atlantic Championship; SVRA Sprint Series
21	Summit Point Motorsports Park	Summit Point, West Virginia	August 18		Race cancelled (Note: Summit Point Race 3 - Cancelled, No Points)			F2000 Championship Series; North American F1000 Championship; Atlantic Championship; SVRA Sprint Series

== Scoring system ==
Points are awarded to the top twenty-five classified drivers, and the top drivers who are able to achieve the Pole Position or the Fastest Lap during the qualify session are awarded with the corresponding +3 and +2 bonus points.

The Season Championship will recognize only each driver's best 18 of 21 race results including all bonus points earned.

Points are awarded using the following system:

Position	1st	2nd	3rd	4th	5th	6th	7th	8th	9th	10th	11th	12th	13th	14th	15th	16th	17th	18th	19th	20th	21st	22nd	23rd	24th	25th+	DNF
Points	50	42	37	34	31	29	27	25	23	21	19	17	15	13	11	10	9	8	7	6	5	4	3	2	1	1

Guest drivers are ineligible to score points.

If a guest driver finishes in first position, the second-placed finisher will receive 50 points. The same goes for every other points scoring position. Thus, if three guest drivers place fourth, fifth and sixth, the seventh-placed finisher will receive 34 points and so forth – until the twenty-eighth-placed finisher receives the final point.

== Driver standings ==
Pos	Driver	RAT			MOH			LRP			PITT			RA			NJMP			SP			Pts	Drop Points
1	(United States) Sebastian Mateo Naranjo	C	1	1	3	2	3	2	1	1	**1**	1	1	1	15 (Note: Findings: #80 Found in violation of: 1.6.17.3: AVOIDABLE CONTACT & 1.6.17.4: RACING ROOM. Loss of 10 racing points)	8	1	3	2 (Note: Findings: #80 found in violation of: 1.6.17.3: AVOIDABLE CONTACT. Loss of 10 racing points and purse.)	10	6	C	**770**	721
2	(United States) Timothy Steele	C	3	5	4	18	5	11	3	2	2	DNF	DNS	7	3 (Note: Findings: #7 Found in violation of: 1.6.17.5: SAFE PASS & 1.6.17.3: AVOIDABLE CONTACT. Loss of 15 racing points and purse.)	5	2	1	3	4	2	C	**567**	558
3	(United States) Karsten Defonce	C	10	11	5	4	2	5	5	17	3	2	3	9	6	17	**4**	2	1	2	9	C	**595**	558
4	(United States) Ethan Tovo	C	8	7	10	6	4	10	2	6	5	4	5	18	4	6	5	5	10	6	18	C	**509**	496
5	(United States) Cooper Shipman	C	18	17	**2**	17	22	1	6	4	7	6	2				3	4	4	3	1	C	478	478
6	(United States) Jackson Tovo	C	12	12	6	9	13	**4**	4	3	6	5	6	8	9	9	6	7	8	5	16	C	**493**	451
7	(United States) Ava Hanssen	C	11	8	13	14	14	6	7	8	16	20	7	11	8	10	7	6	7	8	4	C	**416**	387
8	(United States) Ayrton Cahan	C	15	14	15	10	9	7	10	7	23	9	8	12	7	7	DNF	9	6	7	17	C	**365**	352
9	(United States) Dillion Defonce	C	4	9	11	5	6	3	8	5	4	3	4										334	334
10	(United States) Scott Rubenzer	C	5	4	16	11	11				8	8	10	3	5	4				9	8	C	334	334
11	(United States) Joe Colasacco	C	7	6	8	3	7	8	9	10							9	10	11				279	279
12	(United States) Bob Reid	C	14	15	17	15	15	17	12	12	13	15	14	14	11	13	16	12	12	11	5	C	**279**	250
13	(United States) David Livingston Jr.	C	6	3	9	12	8				10	22	16	4	16	3							247	247
14	(United States) Will Velkoff							9	14	9	9	11	11				10	11	9	12	7	C	227	227
15	(United States) Phil Kingham	C	13	16	12	13	12				11	13	13	13	10	11				14	12	C	208	208
16	(United States) Thomas Schrage				1	1	1																156	156
17	(United States) Mike Scanlan				18	19	16	12	15	11	14	14	19				12	15	15				148	148
18	(United States) Michael Dowden	C	20	20	19	16	17	15	11	15	19	18	15	17	14	12							144	144
19	(United States) Ayrton Houk													2	1	1							142	142
20	(United States) Jonathan Lee	C	2	10	7	8	10																136	136
21	(United States) Robert Stowell				20	22	18	16	DNS	Wth				10	12	16	15	DNF	16	16	11	C	131	131
22	(United States) Dave Petzko	C	17	19	21	20	19	14	17	16				16	17	14				18	14	C	120	120
23	(United States) Theodore Burns													5	2	2							115	115
24	(United States) Gary Gecelter							13	16	14	20	16	22				14	16	17				94	94
25	(United States) Jack Sullivan																			**1**	3	C	92	92
26	(United States) Christopher Kierce	C	9	13							12	12	12										89	89
27	(United States) Steve Oseth																11	14	13	13	10	C	85	85
28	(United States) John P Dole																8	8	5				81	81
29	(United States) Trevor Russell	**C**	Wth	Wth	14	7	21							**6**	DNF	DNS							81	81
30	(United States) Greg Peluso	C	19	22							15	17	20							17	13	C	62	62
31	(United States) John Thompson	C	16	18				18	13	13													56	56
32	(United States) Michael Bulzacchelli										17	10	9										53	53
33	(United States) Simon Sikes	C	22	2																			48	48
34	(United States) Jay Messenger													15	13	15							37	37
35	(United States) Charles Anti										22	7	21										36	36
36	(United States) Scott Oliver										18	21	17										22	22
37	(United States) John Kierce										21	19	18										20	20
38	(United States) Joe Parsons																			19	15	C	19	19
39	(United States) Robert Gross				22	21	20																15	15
40	(Australia) Ayush Pasricha	C	21	21																			10	10
Drivers ineligible for points
	(United States) John Dole																13	13	14					
	(United States) Joseph Tovo													19	Wth	Wth								
	(United States) Tom Schwietz																17	DNF	18	15	19	C		
Pos	Driver	RAT			MOH			LRP			PITT			RA			NJMP			SP			Pts	Drop Points
References: FRP Official Points Standings & Championship Series Central (Note: New Jersey Motorsports Park Race 3 is not listed in this source) & Race Monitor

Color	Result
Gold	Winner
Silver	2nd-place finish
Bronze	3rd-place finish
Green	Top 5 finish
Light Blue	Top 10 finish
Dark Blue	Other flagged position
Purple	Did not finish (DNF)
Brown	Withdrew (Wth)
Black	Disqualified (DSQ)
White	Did Not Start (DNS)
White	Race abandoned (C)
Blank	Did not participate

**In-line notation**
**Bold**	Pole position (3 points)
Italics	Fastest lap of the race (2 points)

Master of the Year
Masters

== Incident reports ==
- Road America 2024 - Incident Review/Penalty Report
- NJMP 2024 - Incident Review/Penalty Report

== Live streaming on YouTube ==
- Race 3 of Road Atlanta: Mission Foods Road Atlanta SpeedTour - Sunday Coverage
- Race 1 of Road America: Road America SpeedTour - Saturday Coverage
- Race 2 of Road America: Road America SpeedTour - Sunday Coverage
