= 2025 Formula 4 United States Championship =

Motor racing competition

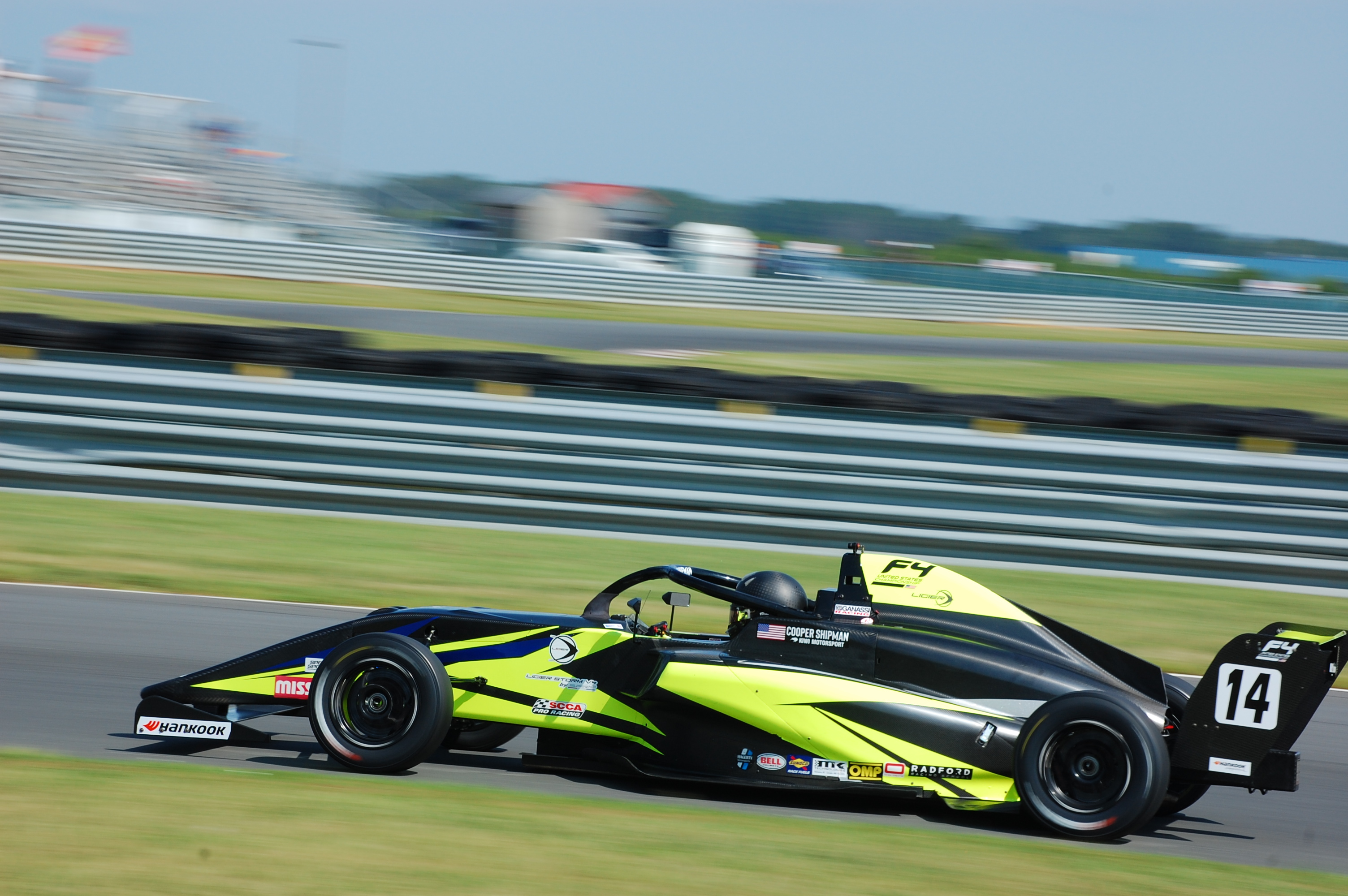
Cooper Shipman won the 2025 championship driving for Kiwi Motorsport.

The 2025 Formula 4 United States Championship season was the tenth season of the Formula 4 United States Championship, a motor racing series regulated according to FIA Formula 4 regulations and sanctioned by SCCA Pro Racing, the professional racing division of the Sports Car Club of America.

== Teams and drivers ==
Team	No.	Driver	Status	Rounds
(United States) Crosslink Motorsports	5	(United States) Demitri Nolan	R	All
(United States) Crosslink Motorsports	29	(United States) Kekai Hauanio	R	All
(United States) Kiwi Motorsport	14	(United States) Cooper Shipman	R	1–6
(United States) Kiwi Motorsport	15	(South Africa) Zach Fourie		7
(United States) Kiwi Motorsport	17	(Chile) Clemente Huerta	R	All
(United States) Kiwi Motorsport	88	(Canada) Oliver Savoie	R	5–7
(United States) Scuderia Buell	27	(Argentina) Augusto Paschetta		7
(United States) Scuderia Buell	54	(Republic of Ireland) Conor Grant	R	1
(United States) RASE Motorsports	32	(United States) Ty Arbogast	R	1–2
(United States) RASE Motorsports	32	(United States) Jonathan Cottrill	R	6
(United States) MLT Motorsports	54	(United States) Jonathan Cottrill	R	7
(United States) MLT Motorsports	55	(Venezuela) Alex Popow Jr.	R	All
(United States) Toney Driver Development	51	(United States) Luke Powers	R	2, 4–7
(United States) LC Racing Academy	68	(Canada) Caleb Campbell	R	All

Icon	Status
R	Rookie

== Race calendar ==
The 2025 calendar was announced on 27 September 2024.

Round		Circuit	Date	Pole position	Fastest lap	Winning driver	Winning team	Supporting
1	R1	(United States) NOLA Motorsports Park, Avondale	29 March	(United States) Cooper Shipman (Note: Hauanio set the fastest time in the qualifying session but received a five-place grid penalty for using sticker tires during Practice. Shipman inherited the pole position.)	(United States) Cooper Shipman	(United States) Kekai Hauanio	(United States) Crosslink Motorsports	Formula Regional Americas Championship; SVRA
1	R2	(United States) NOLA Motorsports Park, Avondale	29 March		(Venezuela) Alex Popow Jr.	(Venezuela) Alex Popow Jr.	(United States) MLT Motorsports	Formula Regional Americas Championship; SVRA
1	R3	(United States) NOLA Motorsports Park, Avondale	30 March		(Venezuela) Alex Popow Jr.	(Venezuela) Alex Popow Jr.	(United States) MLT Motorsports	Formula Regional Americas Championship; SVRA
2	R1	(United States) Road America, Elkhart Lake	17 May	(Venezuela) Alex Popow Jr. (Note: Qualifying was cancelled due to inclement weather. The grid was set according to championship position.)	(United States) Demitri Nolan	(United States) Kekai Hauanio	(United States) Crosslink Motorsports	Formula Regional Americas Championship; SVRA
2	R2	(United States) Road America, Elkhart Lake	18 May		(Venezuela) Alex Popow Jr.	(Canada) Caleb Campell	(United States) LC Racing Academy	Formula Regional Americas Championship; SVRA
2	R3	(United States) Road America, Elkhart Lake	18 May		(United States) Cooper Shipman	(United States) Kekai Hauanio	(United States) Crosslink Motorsports	Formula Regional Americas Championship; SVRA
3	R1	(United States) Mid-Ohio Sports Car Course, Lexington	21 June	(United States) Cooper Shipman	(Venezuela) Alex Popow Jr.	(United States) Cooper Shipman	(United States) Kiwi Motorsport	Formula Regional Americas Championship; Trans-Am Series; SVRA
3	R2	(United States) Mid-Ohio Sports Car Course, Lexington	22 June		(Canada) Caleb Campell	(United States) Cooper Shipman	(United States) Kiwi Motorsport	Formula Regional Americas Championship; Trans-Am Series; SVRA
4	R1	(United States) New Jersey Motorsports Park, Millville	2 August	(Venezuela) Alex Popow Jr.	(United States) Cooper Shipman	(United States) Cooper Shipman	(United States) Kiwi Motorsport	Formula Regional Americas Championship; SVRA
4	R2	(United States) New Jersey Motorsports Park, Millville	3 August		(United States) Cooper Shipman	(United States) Cooper Shipman	(United States) Kiwi Motorsport	Formula Regional Americas Championship; SVRA
4	R3	(United States) New Jersey Motorsports Park, Millville	3 August		race cancelled after changes to the schedule of the meeting			Formula Regional Americas Championship; SVRA
5	R1	(Canada) Canadian Tire Motorsport Park, Bowmanville	30 August	(United States) Cooper Shipman	(Chile) Clemente Huerta	(United States) Cooper Shipman	(United States) Kiwi Motorsport	NASCAR Canada Series; Formula Regional Americas Championship; Trans-Am Series
5	R2	(Canada) Canadian Tire Motorsport Park, Bowmanville	30 August		(United States) Cooper Shipman	(United States) Cooper Shipman	(United States) Kiwi Motorsport	NASCAR Canada Series; Formula Regional Americas Championship; Trans-Am Series
5	R3	(Canada) Canadian Tire Motorsport Park, Bowmanville	31 August		(United States) Cooper Shipman	(United States) Cooper Shipman	(United States) Kiwi Motorsport	NASCAR Canada Series; Formula Regional Americas Championship; Trans-Am Series
6	R1	(United States) Virginia International Raceway, Alton	20 September	(United States) Cooper Shipman	(United States) Cooper Shipman	(United States) Cooper Shipman	(United States) Kiwi Motorsport	Formula Regional Americas Championship; Trans-Am Series; SVRA
6	R2	(United States) Virginia International Raceway, Alton	21 September		(United States) Cooper Shipman	(United States) Cooper Shipman	(United States) Kiwi Motorsport	Formula Regional Americas Championship; Trans-Am Series; SVRA
7	R1	(United States) Barber Motorsports Park, Birmingham	18 October	(Venezuela) Alex Popow Jr.	(Venezuela) Alex Popow Jr.	(Venezuela) Alex Popow Jr.	(United States) MLT Motorsports	Formula Regional Americas Championship; Trans-Am Series; SVRA
7	R2	(United States) Barber Motorsports Park, Birmingham	19 October		(Venezuela) Alex Popow Jr.	(Venezuela) Alex Popow Jr.	(United States) MLT Motorsports	Formula Regional Americas Championship; Trans-Am Series; SVRA

== Championship standings ==
Points are awarded as follows:

Position	**1st**	**2nd**	**3rd**	**4th**	**5th**	**6th**	**7th**	**8th**	**9th**	**10th**
Points	25	18	15	12	10	8	6	4	2	1

=== Drivers' standings ===
Pos	Driver	NOL (United States)			ROA (United States)			MOH (United States)		NJM (United States)			MOS (Canada)			VIR (United States)		BAR (United States)		Pts
Pos	Driver	R1	R2	R3	R1	R2	R3 (Note: Half points were awarded as less than 50% of laps were completed under green flag conditions.)	R1	R2	R1	R2	R3	R1	R2	R3	R1	R2	R1	R2	Pts
1	(United States) Cooper Shipman	**2**	2	2	6	2	4	**1**	1	1	1	C	**1**	1	1	**1**	1			298.5
2	(Venezuela) Alex Popow Jr.	3	1	1	**5**	7†	Ret	2	2	**Ret**	4	C	2	2	3	2	2	**1**	1	266
3	(United States) Kekai Hauanio	1	3	4	1	3	1	3	5	2	2	C	4	3	2	3	5	2	2	262.5
4	(Chile) Clemente Huerta	4	4	3	2	6	Ret	6	4	3	3	C	3	8†	DNS	9†	DNS	3	4	155.5
5	(Canada) Caleb Campbell	8	5	5	3	1	Ret	4	3	4	Ret	C	5	6	4	4	DNS	10	6	148
6	(United States) Demitri Nolan	7	6	7	7†	5	2	5	Ret	Ret	6	C	6	5	5	8	3	7	5	126
7	(United States) Luke Powers				Ret	DNS	DNS			5†	5	C	7	4	Ret	6	4	6	7	67
8	(United States) Ty Arbogast	6	7	6	4	4	3													53.5
9	(Canada) Oliver Savoie												Ret	7	6	5	6	8	9	38
10	(South Africa) Zach Fourie																	4	3	27
11	(Republic of Ireland) Conor Grant	5	8	Ret																14
12	(United States) Jonathan Cottrill															7	Ret	9	8	12
13	(Argentina) Augusto Paschetta																	5	Ret	10
Pos	Driver	R1	R2	R3	R1	R2	R3	R1	R2	R1	R2	R3	R1	R2	R3	R1	R2	R1	R2	Pts
Pos	Driver	NOL (United States)			ROA (United States)			MOH (United States)		NJM (United States)			MOS (Canada)			VIR (United States)		BAR (United States)		Pts

Colour	Result
Gold	Winner
Silver	Second place
Bronze	Third place
Green	Points classification
Blue	Non-points classification
Blue	Non-classified finish (NC)
Purple	Retired, not classified (Ret)
Red	Did not qualify (DNQ)
Red	Did not pre-qualify (DNPQ)
Black	Disqualified (DSQ)
White	Did not start (DNS)
White	Withdrew (WD)
White	Race cancelled (C)
Blank	Did not practice (DNP)
Blank	Did not arrive (DNA)
Blank	Excluded (EX)

**Bold** – Pole
Italics – Fastest Lap

=== Teams' standings ===
Each team acquires the points earned by their two best drivers in each race.

Pos	Team	NOL (United States)			ROA (United States)			MOH (United States)		NJM (United States)			MOS (Canada)			VIR (United States)		BAR (United States)		Pts
Pos	Team	R1	R2	R3	R1	R2	R3	R1	R2	R1	R2	R3	R1	R2	R3	R1	R2	R1	R2	Pts
1	(United States) Kiwi Motorsport	2	2	2	2	2	4	1	1	1	1	C	1	1	1	1	1	3	3	507
1	(United States) Kiwi Motorsport	4	4	3	6	6	Ret	6	4	3	3	C	3	7	6	5	6	4	4	507
2	(United States) Crosslink Motorsports	1	3	4	1	3	1	3	5	2	2	C	4	3	2	3	3	2	2	388.5
2	(United States) Crosslink Motorsports	7	6	7	7†	5	2	5	Ret	Ret	6	C	6	5	5	8	5	7	5	388.5
3	(United States) MLT Motorsports	3	1	1	5	7†	Ret	2	2	Ret	4	C	2	2	3	2	2	1	1	272
3	(United States) MLT Motorsports																	9	8	272
4	(United States) LC Racing Academy	8	5	5	3	1	Ret	4	3	4	Ret	C	5	6	4	4	DNS	10	6	148
5	(United States) Toney Driver Development				Ret	DNS	DNS			5†	5	C	7	4	Ret	6	4	6	7	67
6	(United States) RASE Motorsports	6	7	6	4	4	3									7	Ret			59.5
7	(United States) Scuderia Buell	5	8	Ret														5	Ret	24
Pos	Team	R1	R2	R3	R1	R2	R3	R1	R2	R1	R2	R3	R1	R2	R3	R1	R2	R1	R2	Pts
Pos	Team	NOL (United States)			ROA (United States)			MOH (United States)		NJM (United States)			MOS (Canada)			VIR (United States)		BAR (United States)		Pts
