= Cooper Shipman =

American racing driver

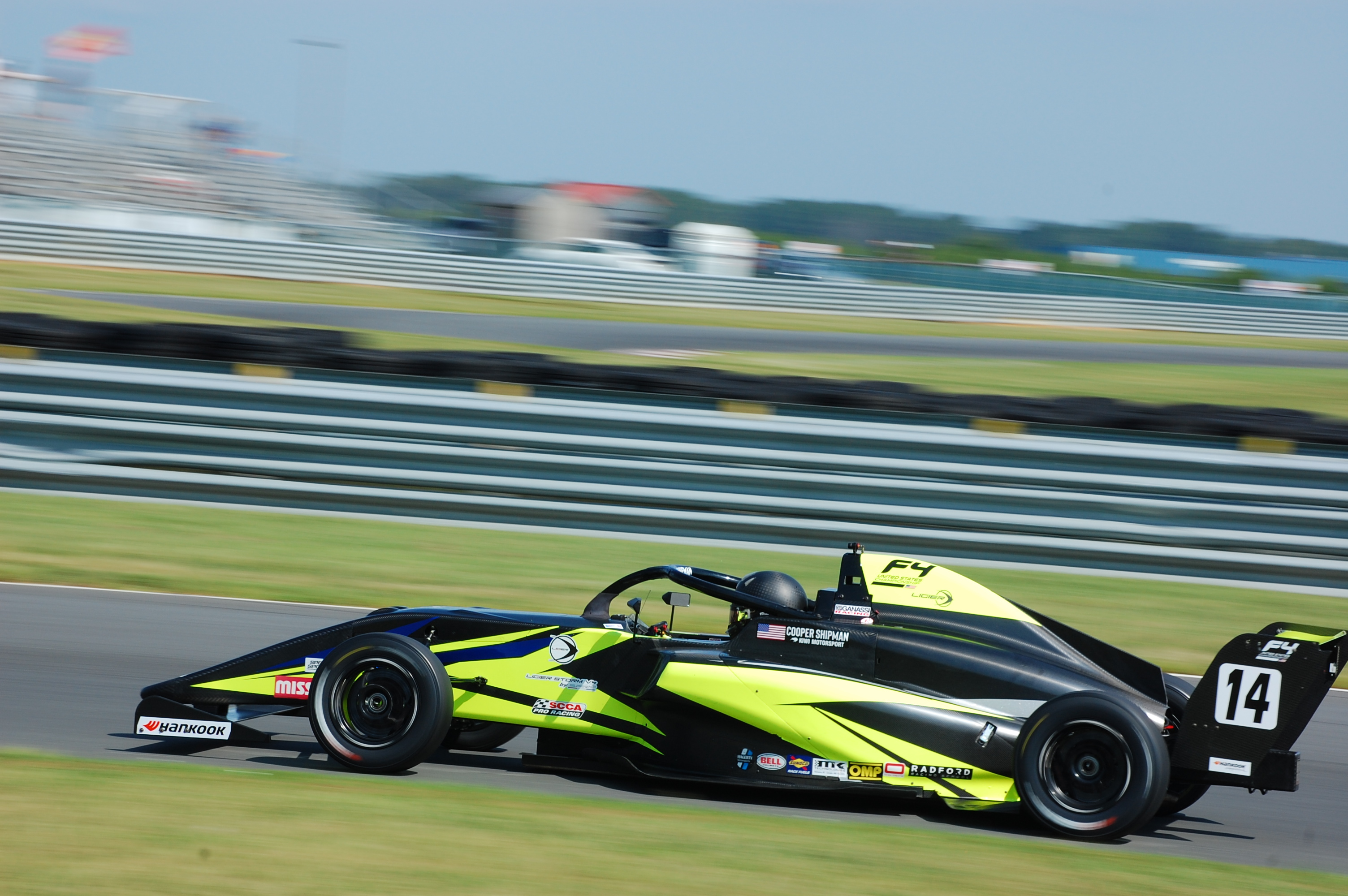
- Shipman at New Jersey Motorsports Park in 2025
- Nationality: (United States) American
- Born: March 11, 2008 (age 18) Austin, Texas, United States

Cooper Shipman (born March 11, 2008) is an American racing driver who is set to compete for in the Formula Regional Americas Championship with Kiwi Motorsport. He won the 2025 Formula 4 United States Championship.

== Career ==
=== Karting ===
Shipman began karting at the age of five in New Braunfels and Katy, TX and had a consistent career, winning the 2020 Texas Sprint Series in the Mini Swift category and coming runner-up to the series in the KA100 Junior class championship a year later.

He finished second in the 2021 SKUSA SuperNationals XXIV with Iron Rock Motorsports in the KA 100 Jr category. He was also runner-up to the 2024 United States Pro Kart Series in the KA100 Senior championship class.

=== Formula Ford ===
==== 2023 ====
Shipman made his single-seater debut in the 2023 F1600 Championship Series, where he contested three rounds of the season with IronRock Motorsports. He got his first top-five finish in the second race of the final round at Summit Point Motorsports Park and ended the championship in twenty-seventh.

==== 2024 ====
He continued with IronRock Motorsports for the following season, where he competed in all the rounds but one and came fifth in the championship, bagging two wins at Lime Rock Park and Summit Point Motorsports Park.

=== Formula 4 ===
With Kiwi Motorsports, he made his debut in the Formula 4 United States Championship in 2025. He dominated the season, winning nine races and grabbing thirteen podiums, clinching the championship a round early.

=== Formula Regional (2025–present) ===
==== 2025 ====
Shortly after winning the F4 US title, Shipman skipped the final round of the series to compete in the final round of the Formula Regional Americas Championship at Barber Motorsports Park with Kiwi Motorsports and scored a podium on debut.

==== 2026 ====
To kick off 2026, Shipman drove in the Formula Regional Oceania Trophy for Kiwi Motorsport. He got his sole podium in the third round at Teretonga Park and ended the championship in fifteenth. With his F4 US scholarship winnings, he then partook in a full-time campaign of the Formula Regional Americas Championship with Kiwi Motorsport for the rest of 2026. He took his maiden win in the final race of the opening round at NOLA Motorsports Park, where he also got two podiums in the first two races. Shipman's next podium came at Indianapolis Motor Speedway, where he achieved a double podium. A round later at New Jersey Motorsports Park, he got his second win.

== Karting record ==
=== Karting career summary ===
Season	Series	Team	Position
2017	SKUSA SuperNationals XXI – Micro Swift		9th
2018	SKUSA Pro Tour – Micro Swift		9th
2018	SKUSA SuperNationals XXII – Mini Swift	Iron Rock Motorsports	47th
2019	SKUSA Pro Tour – Mini Swift		8th
2019	SKUSA SuperNationals XXIII – Mini Swift		9th
2019	Biloxi ROK Fest – Mini ROK	Iron Rock	7th
2020	Texas Sprint Series – Mini Swift		1st
2020	SKUSA Winter Series – Mini Swift		13th
2020	Florida Winter Tour – Mini ROK	Iron Rock	18th
2020	SKUSA Pro Tour – Mini Swift		7th
2021	Texas Sprint Series – KA100 Junior		2nd
2021	SKUSA SuperNationals XXIV – KA100 Jr.	Iron Rock Motorsports	2nd
2022	SKUSA Pro Tour – KA100 Jr		3rd
2022	SKUSA SuperNationals XXV – KA100 Jr.	Iron Rock Motorsports	33rd
2022	SKUSA SuperNationals XXV – X30 Junior	Iron Rock Motorsports	47th
2023	United States Pro Kart Series – KA100 Senior		4th
2024	United States Pro Kart Series – KA100 Senior		2nd

== Racing record ==
=== Racing career summary ===
Season	Series	Team	Races	Wins	Poles	F/Laps	Podiums	Points	Position
2023	F1600 Championship Series	IronRock Motorsports	9	0	0	0	0	127	27th
2024	F1600 Championship Series	IronRock Motorsports	16	2	1	0	6	478	5th
2025	Formula 4 United States Championship	Kiwi Motorsport	15	9	4	8	13	298.5	**1st**
2025	Formula Regional Americas Championship	Kiwi Motorsports	2	0	0	0	1	16	17th
2026	Formula Regional Oceania Trophy	Kiwi Motorsport	15	0	0	0	1	108	15th
2026	Formula Regional Americas Championship	Kiwi Motorsport	20	3	0	5	10	234.5	**3rd**

* Season still in progress.

=== Complete Formula 4 United States Championship results ===
(key) (Races in bold indicate pole position) (Races in italics indicate fastest lap)

Year	Team	1	2	3	4	5	6	7	8	9	10	11	12	13	14	15	16	17	18	Pos	Points
2025	Kiwi Motorsport	**NOL**; **1**; 2	NOL; 2; 2	NOL; 3; 2	ROA; 1; 6	ROA; 2; 2	ROA; 3; 4	**MOH**; **1**; 1	MOH; 2; 1	NJM; 1; 1	NJM; 2; 1	NJM; 3 C	**MOS**; **1**; 1	MOS; 2; 1	MOS; 3; 1	**VIR**; **1**; 1	VIR; 2; 1	BAR; 1	BAR; 2	1st	298.5

=== Complete Formula Regional Americas Championship results ===
(key) (Races in bold indicate pole position) (Races in italics indicate fastest lap)

Year	Team	1	2	3	4	5	6	7	8	9	10	11	12	13	14	15	16	17	18	19	20	21	22	DC	Points
2025	Kiwi Motorsports	NOL; 1	NOL; 2	NOL; 3	ROA; 1	ROA; 2	ROA; 3	IMS; 1	IMS; 2	IMS; 3	MOH; 1	MOH; 2	MOH; 3	NJM; 1	NJM; 2	NJM; 3	MOS; 1	MOS; 2	MOS; 3	VIR; 1	VIR; 2	BAR; 1; 3	BAR; 2; 10	17th	16
2026	Kiwi Motorsport	NOL; 1; 3	NOL; 2; 2	NOL; 3; 1	ROA; 1; 8	ROA; 2; 9	ROA; 3 C	MOH; 1; 4	ROH; 2; 4	IMS; 1; 3	IMS; 2; 2	IMS; 3; 4	NJM; 1; 6	NJM; 2; 1	NJM; 3; 14†	MOS; 1; 3	MOS; 2; 2	MOS; 3 Ret	VIR; 1 Ret	VIR; 2; 5	ALA; 1; 3	ALA; 2; 1		3rd	234.5

=== Complete Formula Regional Oceania Trophy results ===
(key) (Races in bold indicate pole position) (Races in italics indicate fastest lap)

Year	Team	1	2	3	4	5	6	7	8	9	10	11	12	13	14	15	16	DC	Points
2026	Kiwi Motorsport	HMP; 1 Ret	HMP; 2; 8	HMP; 3; 15	HMP; 4; 12	TAU; 1; 18	TAU; 2; 16	TAU; 3; 10	TAU; 4; 15	TER; 1; 6	TER; 2; 3	TER; 3 C	TER; 4; 13	HIG; 1; 11	HIG; 2; 17	HIG; 3; 14	HIG; 4; 17†	15th	108
