= 2026 NACAM Formula 4 Championship =

Auto racing series

The 2026 NACAM Formula 4 Championship season was the tenth season of the NACAM Formula 4 Championship. It commenced on 28 February at Autódromo Miguel E. Abed in Amozoc de Mota and concluded on 22 November at Autódromo Hermanos Rodríguez in Mexico City.

== Teams and drivers ==
All teams were Mexican-registered.

Team	No.	Driver	Rounds
Alessandros Blue (Note: No. 4 and No. 08 cars are entered as Alessandros Blue, No. 26 and No. 33 are entered as Alessandros Red and No. 27 is entered as Alessandros Silver); Alessandros Red; Alessandros Silver	4	(Mexico) Mariano Alatorre	All
Alessandros Blue; Alessandros Red; Alessandros Silver	26	(Mexico) Mateo Girón	1, 3, 6
Alessandros Blue; Alessandros Red; Alessandros Silver	26	(Colombia) Alex Popow Jr. (Note: Popow is Venezuelan but competed under a Colombian license.)	2
Alessandros Blue; Alessandros Red; Alessandros Silver	26	(Mexico) Octavio Ruano	4, 7
Alessandros Blue; Alessandros Red; Alessandros Silver	27	(Mexico) Leonardo Mancera	5–7
Alessandros Blue; Alessandros Red; Alessandros Silver	33	(Mexico) Alan Zezatti	All
Alessandros Blue; Alessandros Red; Alessandros Silver	08	(Mexico) Alejandro Bobadilla	All
Santinel Racing Team 1 (Note: No. 7 and No. 14 cars are entered as Santinel Racing Team 1, while No. 15 are entered as Santinel Racing Team 2); Santinel Racing Team 2	7	(Mexico) Marco Alquicira	All
Santinel Racing Team 1 Santinel Racing Team 2	14	(Mexico) Agustin Herrera	All
Santinel Racing Team 1 Santinel Racing Team 2	15	(Mexico) Jose Carlos Lezama	All
Ram Racing 1 (Note: No. 16 and No. 90 cars are entered as Ram Racing 1, while No. 57 and No. 91 are entered as Ram Racing 2); Ram Racing 2	16	(Mexico) Fernando Rivera	All
Ram Racing 1 Ram Racing 2	57	(Mexico) Emilio Martinez	All
Ram Racing 1 Ram Racing 2	77	(Mexico) Luis Fernando Nuñez	7
Ram Racing 1 Ram Racing 2	90	(Mexico) Oliver Trejo	All
Ram Racing 1 Ram Racing 2	91	(Armenia) Patrick Isavi	All
RRK Motorsports	53	(Mexico) Moisés Zagursky	1–3, 7

== Race calendar and results ==
All rounds are held in Mexico. Except the support round of the 2026 Mexico City Grand Prix, all rounds were part of the Mexico Racing Cup.

Round		Circuit	Date	Pole position	Fastest lap	Winning driver	Winning team
1	R1	(Mexico) Autódromo Miguel E. Abed (International Road Course, Amozoc, Puebla)	28 February	(Mexico) Alejandro Bobadilla	(Mexico) Mateo Girón	(Mexico) Alejandro Bobadilla	Alessandros Blue
1	R2	(Mexico) Autódromo Miguel E. Abed (International Road Course, Amozoc, Puebla)	1 March		(Mexico) Alejandro Bobadilla	(Mexico) Oliver Trejo	Ram Racing
1	R3	(Mexico) Autódromo Miguel E. Abed (International Road Course, Amozoc, Puebla)	1 March	(Mexico) Alejandro Bobadilla	(Mexico) Alejandro Bobadilla	(Mexico) Alejandro Bobadilla	Alessandros Blue
2	R1	Autódromo Hermanos Rodríguez (Grand Prix Circuit, Mexico City)	27 March	(Mexico) Alejandro Bobadilla	(Mexico) Alan Zezatti	(Mexico) Alan Zezatti	Alessandros Red
2	R2	Autódromo Hermanos Rodríguez (Grand Prix Circuit, Mexico City)	28 March		(Mexico) Marco Alquicira	(Mexico) Alejandro Bobadilla	Alessandros Blue
2	R3	Autódromo Hermanos Rodríguez (Grand Prix Circuit, Mexico City)	28 March	(Colombia) Alex Popow Jr.	(Mexico) Marco Alquicira	(Colombia) Alex Popow Jr.	Alessandros Red
3	R1	Autódromo Hermanos Rodríguez (National Circuit with chicane, Mexico City)	1 May	(Mexico) Alejandro Bobadilla	(Mexico) Alejandro Bobadilla	(Mexico) Mateo Girón	Alessandros Red
3	R2	Autódromo Hermanos Rodríguez (National Circuit with chicane, Mexico City)	2 May		(Mexico) Mariano Alatorre	(Mexico) Alejandro Bobadilla	Alessandros Blue
3	R3	Autódromo Hermanos Rodríguez (National Circuit with chicane, Mexico City)	2 May	(Mexico) Alejandro Bobadilla	(Mexico) Alejandro Bobadilla	(Mexico) Alejandro Bobadilla	Alessandros Blue
4	R1	Autódromo Hermanos Rodríguez (National Circuit with chicane, Mexico City)	24 July	(Mexico) Alejandro Bobadilla	(Mexico) Alan Zezatti	(Mexico) Alejandro Bobadilla	Alessandros Blue
4	R2	Autódromo Hermanos Rodríguez (National Circuit with chicane, Mexico City)	25 July	(Mexico) Alejandro Bobadilla	(Mexico) Alan Zezatti	(Mexico) Alejandro Bobadilla	Alessandros Blue
4	R3	Autódromo Hermanos Rodríguez (National Circuit with chicane, Mexico City)	25 July		(Mexico) Alan Zezatti	(Mexico) Fernando Rivera	Ram Racing
5	R1	(Mexico) Autódromo Miguel E. Abed (International Road Course, Amozoc, Puebla)	11 September	(Mexico) Alan Zezatti	(Mexico) Alan Zezatti	(Mexico) Alan Zezatti	Alessandros Red
5	R2	(Mexico) Autódromo Miguel E. Abed (International Road Course, Amozoc, Puebla)	12 September		(Mexico) Alan Zezatti	(Mexico) Oliver Trejo	Ram Racing
5	R3	(Mexico) Autódromo Miguel E. Abed (International Road Course, Amozoc, Puebla)	12 September	(Mexico) Alan Zezatti	(Mexico) Mariano Alatorre	(Mexico) José Lezama	Santinel RT 2
6	R1	(Mexico) Autódromo Miguel E. Abed (International Road Course, Amozoc, Puebla)	3–4 October				
6	R2	(Mexico) Autódromo Miguel E. Abed (International Road Course, Amozoc, Puebla)	3–4 October				
6	R3	(Mexico) Autódromo Miguel E. Abed (International Road Course, Amozoc, Puebla)	3–4 October				
7	R1	Autódromo Hermanos Rodríguez (Grand Prix Circuit, Mexico City)	30 October				
7	R2	Autódromo Hermanos Rodríguez (Grand Prix Circuit, Mexico City)	1 November				

== Championship standings ==
Points are awarded to the top 10 classified finishers in each race.

Position	**1st**	**2nd**	**3rd**	**4th**	**5th**	**6th**	**7th**	**8th**	**9th**	**10th**
Points	25	18	15	12	10	8	6	4	2	1

=== Drivers' Championship ===
Pos	Driver	PUE1 (Mexico)			AHR1 (Mexico)			AHR2 (Mexico)			AHR3 (Mexico)			PUE2 (Mexico)			PUE3 (Mexico)			AHR4 (Mexico)		Pts
Pos	Driver	R1	R2	R3	R1	R2	R3	R1	R2	R3	R1	R2	R3	R1	R2	R3	R1	R2	R3	R1	R2	Pts
1	(Mexico) Alejandro Bobadilla	**1**	2	**1**	**3**	1	5	**4**	1	**1**	**1**	**1**	4	2	2	Ret						278
2	(Mexico) Alan Zezatti	6	3	3	1	3	2	2	3	3	2	3	2	**1**	7	**7**						232
3	(Mexico) Oliver Trejo	5	1	6	6	DNS	3	5	7	6	3	2	3	4	1	5						185
4	(Mexico) Mariano Alatorre	4	5	2	5	4	DNS	7	2	4	8	4	Ret	3	3	4						156
5	(Mexico) Fernando Rivera	7	4	5	4	5	10†	6	6	5	5	11	1	5	4	3						149
6	(Mexico) Marco Alquicira	2	10	4	9	Ret	4	3	5	7	4	5	5	6	5	10						127
7	(Mexico) Emilio Martinez	10	7	8	7	7	9†	Ret	9	8	6	6	6	7	6	6						77
8	(Mexico) Mateo Girón	3	Ret	DNS				1	4	2												70
9	(Colombia) Alex Popow Jr.				2	2	**1**															61
10	(Mexico) Jose Carlos Lezama	Ret	9	9	11	9	7	8	10	11	Ret	10	7	10	10	1						51
11	(Mexico) Agustin Herrera	8	8	10	10	8	Ret	10	12	12	Ret	8	8	9	11	2						43
12	(Mexico) Moisés Zagursky	11	6	7	8	6	6	9	8	9												42
13	(Armenia) Patrick Isavi	9	Ret	11	12	Ret	8	Ret	11	10	Ret	9	10	11	9	8						16
14	(Mexico) Octavio Ruano										7	7	9									14
15	(Mexico) Leonardo Mancera													8	8	9						10
Pos	Driver	R1	R2	R3	R1	R2	R3	R1	R2	R3	R1	R2	R3	R1	R2	R3	R1	R2	R3	R1	R2	Pts
Pos	Driver	PUE1 (Mexico)			AHR1 (Mexico)			AHR2 (Mexico)			AHR3 (Mexico)			PUE2 (Mexico)			PUE3 (Mexico)			AHR4 (Mexico)		Pts

Colour	Result
Gold	Winner
Silver	Second place
Bronze	Third place
Green	Points classification
Blue	Non-points classification
Blue	Non-classified finish (NC)
Purple	Retired, not classified (Ret)
Red	Did not qualify (DNQ)
Red	Did not pre-qualify (DNPQ)
Black	Disqualified (DSQ)
White	Did not start (DNS)
White	Withdrew (WD)
White	Race cancelled (C)
Blank	Did not practice (DNP)
Blank	Did not arrive (DNA)
Blank	Excluded (EX)

**Bold** – Pole
Italics – Fastest Lap
