= Alex Popow Jr. =

Venezuelan racing driver (born 2006)

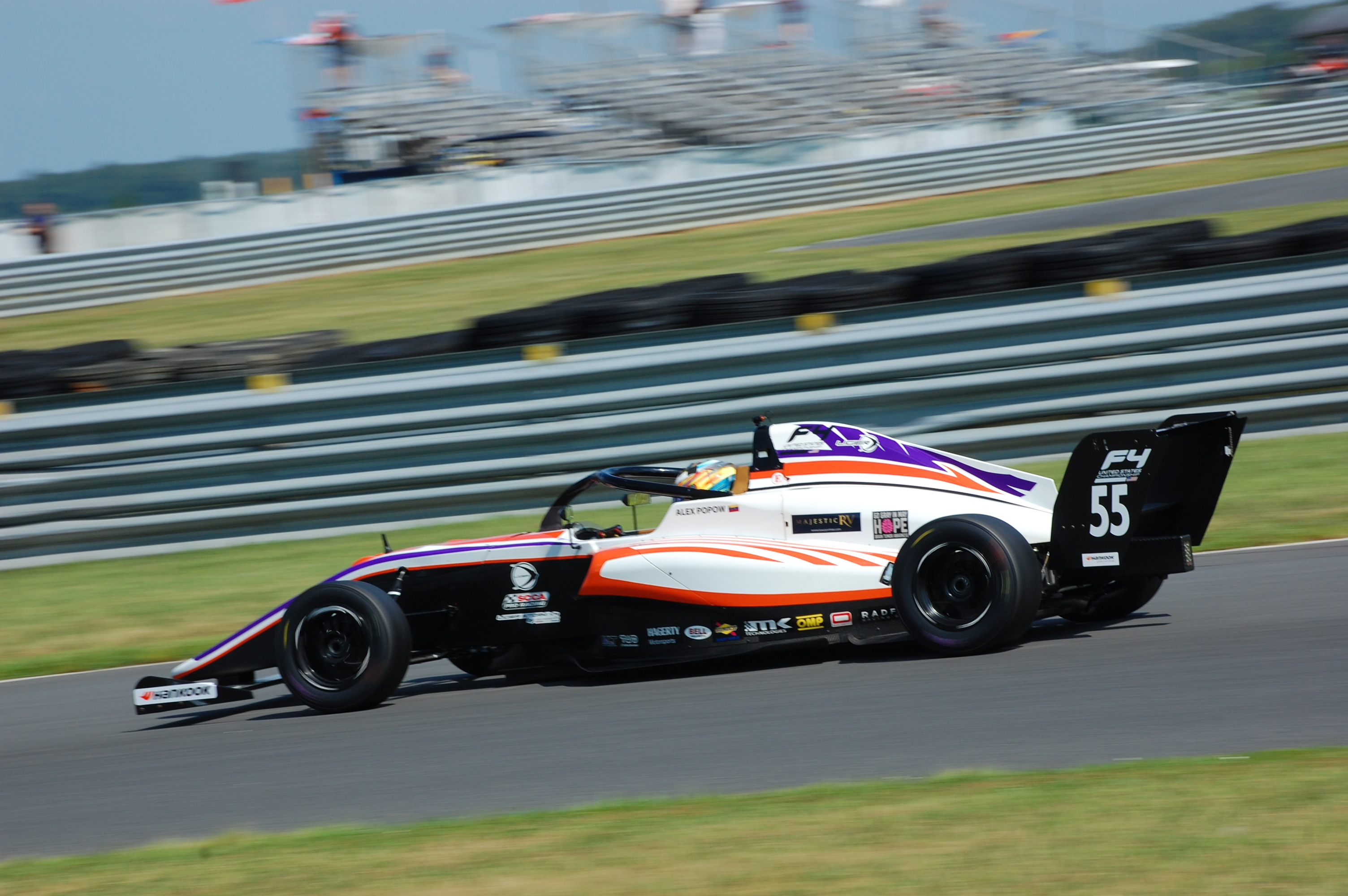
- Popow at New Jersey Motorsports Park in 2025
- Nationality: (Venezuela) Venezuelan (United States) American
- Born: January 2006 (age 20)
- Relatives: Alex Popow (father)

Championship titles
- 2023: Formula Inter

Alex Popow Jr. (born January 2006) is a Venezuelan and American racing who last competed in the NACAM Formula 4 Championship for Alessandros Red. He previously raced in the 2025 Formula 4 United States Championship, finishing runner-up in points.

== Personal life ==
Popow is the son of Lu-Ann Acosta-Rubio and sportscar veteran Alex Popow.

== Career ==
=== Karting and maiden title in single-seaters (2013–2024) ===
Popow began karting in 2013. In his first stint in karts, Popow raced in the United States, in which he also drove in the 24 Hours of Orlando alongside his father, but was forced to take a hiatus from karting in 2018 after two separate incidents in which he broke his collarbone. After delaying his return to racing due to the COVID-19 pandemic, Popow returned to karting in 2021 and stayed in it until 2022, when he made his single-seater debut in Formula Inter's exhibition round.

Remaining in Formula Inter for the following year, Popow scored seven wins in the series' only season to take the title in early September. Popow then tested USF Juniors machinery for Exclusive Autosport at Sebring and Indianapolis later that year, before making his series debut the following year for Zanella Racing. After finishing no higher than 17th at NOLA, Popow left the series before returning to racing in the final round of the Formula 4 United States season at Circuit of the Americas for MLT Motorsports. In his first round in the series, Popow took pole and won the first two races of the weekend before finishing fourth in race three.

=== First full season in Formula 4 United States and NACAM F4 cameos (2025–) ===
Despite testing USF Juniors machinery in late 2024, Popow remained with MLT Motorsports to drive in the Formula 4 United States Championship, after receiving support from the PMH Powering Diversity Scholarship. In the first round of the season at NOLA, finished third in race one before winning the final two races of the weekend to take an early lead in the standings. Popow then took pole at Road America, but was only able to convert it to a best result of fifth all weekend as he dropped to third in points. At Mid-Ohio, Popow finished second in both races to retain third in the standings, before taking pole at New Jersey Motorsports Park but once again was not able to convert it into a win, as he retired in race one and finished fourth in race two. In the series' only trip abroad at Canadian Tire Motorsport Park, Popow finished second in the first two races and ending the weekend by taking third. In the following round at Virginia International Raceway, Popow continued his podium streak as he finished second in both races, before ending the year with a double win at Barber to secure runner-up honors. During 2025, Popow also partook in the second and sixth rounds of the NACAM Formula 4 Championship for Alessandros Blue at Autódromo Hermanos Rodríguez. In the former, Popow scored his best result of the season by finishing second in race three.

The following year, Popow returned to NACAM F4 for a one-off appearance at the second round of the season at Autódromo Hermanos Rodríguez, in which he won race three and finished second in the other two races.

== Racing record ==
=== Racing career summary ===
Season	Series	Team	Races	Wins	Poles	F/Laps	Podiums	Points	Position
2023	Lucas Oil Formula Car Race Series		3	1	0	0	2	93	8th
2024	USF Juniors	Zanella Racing	3	0	0	0	0	6	33rd
2024	Formula 4 United States Championship	MLT Motorsports	3	2	1	1	2	62	8th
2025	Formula 4 United States Championship	MLT Motorsports	17	4	3	6	12	266	**2nd**
2025	NACAM Formula 4 Championship	Alessandros Blue	4	0	0	1	1	50	10th
2026	NACAM Formula 4 Championship	Alessandros Red	3	1	1	0	3	61	9th

=== American open-wheel racing results ===
==== USF Juniors ====
(key) (Races in bold indicate pole position) (Races in italics indicate fastest lap) (Races with * indicate most race laps led)

Year	Team	1	2	3	4	5	6	7	8	9	10	11	12	13	14	15	16	Rank	Points
2024	Zanella Racing	NOL; 1; 25	NOL; 2; 22	NOL; 3; 17	ALA; 1	ALA; 2	VIR; 1	VIR; 2	VIR; 3	MOH; 1	MOH; 2	ROA; 1	ROA; 2	ROA; 3	POR; 1	POR; 2	POR; 3	33rd	6

=== Complete Formula 4 United States Championship results ===
(key) (Races in bold indicate pole position) (Races in italics indicate fastest lap)

Year	Team	1	2	3	4	5	6	7	8	9	10	11	12	13	14	15	16	17	18	Pos	Points
2024	MLT Motorsports	ROA; 1	ROA; 2	ROA; 3	MOH; 1	MOH; 2	MOH; 3	NJM; 1	NJM; 2	NJM; 3	MOS; 1	MOS; 2	MOS; 3	**COA**; **1**; 1	COA; 2; 1	COA; 3; 4				8th	62
2025	MLT Motorsports	NOL; 1; 3	NOL; 2; 1	NOL; 3; 1	**ROA**; **1**; 5	ROA; 2; 7†	ROA; 3 Ret	MOH; 1; 2	MOH; 2; 2	**NJM**; **1** Ret	NJM; 2; 4	NJM; 3 C	MOS; 1; 2	MOS; 2; 2	MOS; 3; 3	VIR; 1; 2	VIR; 2; 2	**BAR**; **1**; 1	BAR; 2; 1	2nd	266

=== Complete NACAM Formula 4 Championship results ===
(key) (Races in bold indicate pole position; races in italics indicate fastest lap)

Year	Team	1	2	3	4	5	6	7	8	9	10	11	12	13	14	15	16	17	18	19	20	DC	Points
2025	Alessandros Blue	PUE1; 1	PUE1; 2	PUE1; 3	AHR1; 1; 5	AHR1; 2; 4	AHR1; 3; 2	AHR2; 1	AHR2; 2	AHR2; 3	AHR3; 1	AHR3; 2	AHR3; 3	PUE2; 1	PUE2; 2	PUE2; 3	AHR4; 1 DNS	AHR4; 2; 5				10th	50
2026	Alessandros Red	PUE1; 1	PUE1; 2	PUE1; 3	AHR1; 1; 2	AHR1; 2; 2	**AHR1**; **3**; 1	AHR2; 1	AHR2; 2	AHR2; 3	AHR3; 1	AHR3; 2	AHR3; 3	PUE2; 1	PUE2; 2	PUE2; 3	PUE3; 1	PUE3; 2	PUE3; 3	AHR3; 1	AHR3; 2	9th	61
