= 2025 NACAM Formula 4 Championship =

Auto racing series

The 2025 NACAM Formula 4 Championship season was the ninth season of the NACAM Formula 4 Championship. It commenced on 8 March at Autódromo Miguel E. Abed in Amozoc de Mota and concluded on 26 October at Autódromo Hermanos Rodríguez in Mexico City.

== Teams and drivers ==
All teams are Mexican-registered.

| Team | No. | Driver | Rounds |
|---|---|---|---|
| RRK Motorsports | 3 | (Mexico) Emil Abed | 6 |
| Santinel Racing Team | 7 | (Mexico) Marco Alquicira | 2–5 |
| Ram Racing 1 (Note: No. 13 and No. 34 cars are entered as Ram Racing 1, while No. 19 and No. 33 cars are entered as Ram Racing 2, and No. 90 and No. 16 cars are entered as Ram Racing 3.); Ram Racing 2 Ram Racing 3 | 13 | (Mexico) Max Mora | 1–5 |
| Ram Racing 1 Ram Racing 2 Ram Racing 3 | 16 | (Mexico) Fernando Rivera | 4–6 |
| Ram Racing 1 Ram Racing 2 Ram Racing 3 | 19 | (Mexico) Elías Vignola | All |
| Ram Racing 1 Ram Racing 2 Ram Racing 3 | 33 | (Mexico) Alan Zezatti | All |
| Ram Racing 1 Ram Racing 2 Ram Racing 3 | 34 | (Mexico) Zaky Ibrahim | All |
| Ram Racing 1 Ram Racing 2 Ram Racing 3 | 90 | (Mexico) Oliver Trejo | 5 |
| Alessandros Blue (Note: No. 17 and No. 27 cars are entered as Alessandros Blue, while No. 29 and No. 08 are entered as Alessandros Silver and No. 26 is entered as Alessandros Red); Alessandros Silver; Alessandros Red | 17 | (Mexico) José Martínez | All |
| Alessandros Blue; Alessandros Silver; Alessandros Red | 26 | (Colombia) Alex Popow Jr. (Note: Popow is Venezuelan, but he competed under a Colombian license) | 6 |
| Alessandros Blue; Alessandros Silver; Alessandros Red | 27 | (Colombia) Alex Popow Jr. | 2 |
| Alessandros Blue; Alessandros Silver; Alessandros Red | 27 | (Mexico) Axel Matus | 1 |
| Alessandros Blue; Alessandros Silver; Alessandros Red | 27 | (United States) Vivek Kanthan | 4 |
| Alessandros Blue; Alessandros Silver; Alessandros Red | 27 | (Mexico) Ivanna Richards | 5 |
| Alessandros Blue; Alessandros Silver; Alessandros Red | 27 | (Mexico) Helio Meza | 6 |
| Alessandros Blue; Alessandros Silver; Alessandros Red | 29 | (Mexico) Fernando Luque | All |
| Alessandros Blue; Alessandros Silver; Alessandros Red | 08 | (Mexico) Alejandro Bobadilla | All |
| HRI Racing | 20 | (Mexico) Ivanna Richards | 1–2 |
| HRI Racing | 90 | (Mexico) Oliver Trejo | 1 |

== Race calendar and results ==
All rounds are held in Mexico. Except the support round of the 2025 Mexico City Grand Prix, all rounds are part of the Copa Notiauto series roster. The planned round at Autódromo Panamá on 5–6 April was postponed and then subsequently not rescheduled.

| Round | | Circuit | Date | Pole position | Fastest lap | Winning driver | Winning team |
|---|---|---|---|---|---|---|---|
| 1 | R1 | Autódromo Miguel E. Abed (International Road Course, Amozoc, Puebla) | 8 March | (Mexico) José Martínez | (Mexico) Zaky Ibrahim | (Mexico) Zaky Ibrahim | RAM Racing 1 |
| 1 | R2 | Autódromo Miguel E. Abed (International Road Course, Amozoc, Puebla) | 9 March | | (Mexico) Zaky Ibrahim | (Mexico) Fernando Luque | Alessandros Silver |
| 1 | R3 | Autódromo Miguel E. Abed (International Road Course, Amozoc, Puebla) | 9 March | (Mexico) José Martínez | (Mexico) José Martínez | (Mexico) Zaky Ibrahim | RAM Racing 1 |
| 2 | R1 | Autódromo Hermanos Rodríguez (National Circuit with Foro Sol, Mexico City) | 2 May | (Mexico) Zaky Ibrahim | (Mexico) Marco Alquicira | (Mexico) Zaky Ibrahim | RAM Racing 1 |
| 2 | R2 | Autódromo Hermanos Rodríguez (National Circuit with Foro Sol, Mexico City) | 3 May | | (Mexico) Fernando Luque | (Mexico) Zaky Ibrahim | RAM Racing 1 |
| 2 | R3 | Autódromo Hermanos Rodríguez (National Circuit with Foro Sol, Mexico City) | 3 May | (Mexico) Zaky Ibrahim | (Colombia) Alex Popow Jr. | (Mexico) Zaky Ibrahim | RAM Racing 1 |
| 3 | R1 | Autódromo Hermanos Rodríguez (National Circuit with Foro Sol, Mexico City) | 20 June | (Mexico) Fernando Luque | (Mexico) Zaky Ibrahim | (Mexico) Zaky Ibrahim | RAM Racing 1 |
| 3 | R2 | Autódromo Hermanos Rodríguez (National Circuit with Foro Sol, Mexico City) | 21 June | | (Mexico) Zaky Ibrahim | (Mexico) Fernando Luque | Alessandros Silver |
| 3 | R3 | Autódromo Hermanos Rodríguez (National Circuit with Foro Sol, Mexico City) | 21 June | (Mexico) Fernando Luque | (Mexico) Alan Zezatti | (Mexico) Elías Vignola | RAM Racing 2 |
| 4 | R1 | Autódromo Hermanos Rodríguez (Grand Prix Circuit with Foro Sol, Mexico City) | 15 August | (Mexico) Fernando Rivera | (Mexico) Zaky Ibrahim | (United States) Vivek Kanthan | Alessandros Blue |
| 4 | R2 | Autódromo Hermanos Rodríguez (Grand Prix Circuit with Foro Sol, Mexico City) | 16 August | | (Mexico) Fernando Rivera | (Mexico) Alejandro Bobadilla | Alessandros Silver |
| 4 | R3 | Autódromo Hermanos Rodríguez (Grand Prix Circuit with Foro Sol, Mexico City) | 16 August | (Mexico) Fernando Luque | (Mexico) Marco Alquicira | (Mexico) Marco Alquicira | Santinel Racing Team |
| 5 | R1 | Autódromo Miguel E. Abed (International Short Course, Amozoc, Puebla) | 19 September | (Mexico) Alejandro Bobadilla | (Mexico) Alejandro Bobadilla | (Mexico) Alejandro Bobadilla | Alessandros Silver |
| 5 | R2 | Autódromo Miguel E. Abed (International Short Course, Amozoc, Puebla) | 20 September | | (Mexico) Fernando Luque | (Mexico) José Martínez | Alessandros Blue |
| 5 | R3 | Autódromo Miguel E. Abed (International Short Course, Amozoc, Puebla) | 20 September | (Mexico) Alejandro Bobadilla | (Mexico) Alejandro Bobadilla | (Mexico) Alejandro Bobadilla | Alessandros Silver |
| 6 | R1 | Autódromo Hermanos Rodríguez (Grand Prix Circuit, Mexico City) | 25 October | (Mexico) Helio Meza | (Mexico) Helio Meza | (Mexico) Helio Meza | Alessandros Blue |
| 6 | R2 | Autódromo Hermanos Rodríguez (Grand Prix Circuit, Mexico City) | 26 October | | (Mexico) Fernando Luque | (Mexico) Fernando Luque | Alessandros Silver |

== Championship standings ==
Points are awarded to the top 10 classified finishers in each race.

| Position | **1st** | **2nd** | **3rd** | **4th** | **5th** | **6th** | **7th** | **8th** | **9th** | **10th** |
| Points | 25 | 18 | 15 | 12 | 10 | 8 | 6 | 4 | 2 | 1 |

=== Drivers' Championship ===
| Pos | Driver | PUE1 | | | AHR1 | | | AHR2 | | | AHR3 | | | PUE2 | | | AHR4 | | Pts |
| Pos | Driver | R1 | R2 | R3 | R1 | R2 | R3 | R1 | R2 | R3 | R1 | R2 | R3 | R1 | R2 | R3 | R1 | R2 | Pts |
|---|---|---|---|---|---|---|---|---|---|---|---|---|---|---|---|---|---|---|---|
| 1 | (Mexico) Zaky Ibrahim | 1 | 3 | 1 | **1** | 1 | **1** | 1 | 7 | Ret | 5 | 6 | 4 | 6 | 4 | 4 | 3 | 6 | 256 |
| 2 | (Mexico) Fernando Luque | 4 | 1 | 5 | 2 | 2 | 3 | **DSQ** | 1 | **Ret** | Ret | 3 | **2** | 2 | 3 | 2 | 2 | 1 | 250 |
| 3 | (Mexico) Alejandro Bobadilla | 3 | 2 | 4 | 7 | 5 | 5 | 4 | 2 | 6 | 4 | 1 | Ret | **1** | 10 | **1** | 7 | 3 | 218 |
| 4 | (Mexico) José Martínez | **2** | 6 | **2** | 4 | 6 | 4 | 2 | 3 | 4 | Ret | 4 | 5 | 3 | 1 | 3 | DNS | 4 | 210 |
| 5 | (Mexico) Marco Alquicira | | | | 3 | 3 | Ret | 3 | 4 | 3 | 2 | 5 | 1 | DNS | DNS | DNS | | | 125 |
| 6 | (Mexico) Elías Vignola | 9 | 7 | 8† | 6 | Ret | 6 | 6 | 6 | 1 | 6 | 7 | 7 | 9 | 5 | 6 | 5 | 8 | 123 |
| 7 | (Mexico) Alan Zezatti | 7 | 4 | Ret | 9 | 7 | Ret | 5 | 5 | 2 | 3 | 9 | Ret | 5 | 9 | 5 | 4 | 7 | 121 |
| 8 | (Mexico) Max Mora | 8 | 5 | 6 | 8 | 8 | 7 | 7 | Ret | 5 | 7 | 8 | 6 | 10 | 8 | 9 | | | 81 |
| 9 | (Mexico) Fernando Rivera | | | | | | | | | | **Ret** | 2 | 8 | 7 | 6 | 7 | 6 | 9 | 52 |
| 10 | (Colombia) Alex Popow Jr. | | | | 5 | 4 | 2 | | | | | | | | | | DNS | 5 | 50 |
| 11 | (Mexico) Ivanna Richards | 6 | Ret | 7† | Ret | Ret | Ret | | | | | | | 4 | 2 | Ret | | | 44 |
| 12 | (Mexico) Helio Meza | | | | | | | | | | | | | | | | **1** | 2 | 43 |
| 13 | (United States) Vivek Kanthan | | | | | | | | | | 1 | 10† | 3 | | | | | | 41 |
| 14 | (Mexico) Axel Matus | 5 | Ret | 3 | | | | | | | | | | | | | | | 25 |
| 15 | (Mexico) Oliver Trejo | WD | WD | WD | | | | | | | | | | 8 | 7 | 8 | | | 14 |
| 16 | (Mexico) Emil Abed | | | | | | | | | | | | | | | | DSQ | 10 | 1 |
| Pos | Driver | R1 | R2 | R3 | R1 | R2 | R3 | R1 | R2 | R3 | R1 | R2 | R3 | R1 | R2 | R3 | R1 | R2 | Pts |
| Pos | Driver | PUE1 | | | AHR1 | | | AHR2 | | | AHR3 | | | PUE2 | | | AHR4 | | Pts |

| Colour | Result |
|---|---|
| Gold | Winner |
| Silver | Second place |
| Bronze | Third place |
| Green | Points classification |
| Blue | Non-points classification |
| Blue | Non-classified finish (NC) |
| Purple | Retired, not classified (Ret) |
| Red | Did not qualify (DNQ) |
| Red | Did not pre-qualify (DNPQ) |
| Black | Disqualified (DSQ) |
| White | Did not start (DNS) |
| White | Withdrew (WD) |
| White | Race cancelled (C) |
| Blank | Did not practice (DNP) |
| Blank | Did not arrive (DNA) |
| Blank | Excluded (EX) |

**Bold** – Pole
Italics – Fastest Lap

=== Teams' Championship ===
| Pos | Driver | PUE1 | | | AHR1 | | | AHR2 | | | AHR3 | | | PUE2 | | | AHR4 | | Pts |
| Pos | Driver | R1 | R2 | R3 | R1 | R2 | R3 | R1 | R2 | R3 | R1 | R2 | R3 | R1 | R2 | R3 | R1 | R2 | Pts |
|---|---|---|---|---|---|---|---|---|---|---|---|---|---|---|---|---|---|---|---|
| 1 | Alessandros Silver | 3 | 1 | 4 | 2 | 2 | 3 | 4 | 1 | 6 | 4 | 1 | 2 | 1 | 3 | 1 | 2 | 1 | 468 |
| 1 | Alessandros Silver | 4 | 2 | 5 | 7 | 5 | 5 | DSQ | 2 | Ret | Ret | 3 | Ret | 2 | 10 | 2 | 7 | 3 | 468 |
| 2 | Alessandros Blue | 2 | 6 | 2 | 4 | 4 | 2 | 2 | 3 | 4 | 1 | 4 | 3 | 3 | 1 | 3 | 1 | 2 | 389 |
| 2 | Alessandros Blue | 5 | Ret | 3 | 5 | 6 | 4 | | | | DNS | 10† | 5 | 4 | 2 | Ret | DNS | 4 | 389 |
| 3 | RAM Racing 1 | 1 | 3 | 1 | 1 | 1 | 1 | 1 | 7 | 5 | 5 | 6 | 4 | 6 | 4 | 4 | 3 | 6 | 343 |
| 3 | RAM Racing 1 | 8 | 5 | 6 | 8 | 8 | 7 | 7 | Ret | Ret | 7 | 8 | 6 | 10 | 8 | 9 | 6 | 9 | 343 |
| 4 | RAM Racing 2 | 7 | 4 | 8† | 6 | 7 | 6 | 5 | 5 | 1 | 3 | 7 | 7 | 5 | 5 | 5 | 4 | 7 | 244 |
| 4 | RAM Racing 2 | 9 | 7 | Ret | 9 | Ret | Ret | 6 | 6 | 2 | 6 | 9 | Ret | 9 | 9 | 6 | 5 | 8 | 244 |
| 5 | Santinel RT | | | | 3 | 3 | Ret | 3 | 4 | 3 | 2 | 5 | 1 | DNS | DNS | DNS | | | 125 |
| 6 | RAM Racing 3 | | | | | | | | | | Ret | 2 | 8 | 7 | 6 | 7 | | | 56 |
| 6 | RAM Racing 3 | | | | | | | | | | | | | 8 | 7 | 8 | | | 56 |
| 7 | HRI Racing | 6 | Ret | 7† | Ret | Ret | Ret | | | | | | | | | | | | 14 |
| 8 | Alessandros Red | | | | | | | | | | | | | | | | DNS | 5 | 10 |
| 9 | RRK Motorsport | | | | | | | | | | | | | | | | DSQ | 10 | 1 |
| Pos | Driver | R1 | R2 | R3 | R1 | R2 | R3 | R1 | R2 | R3 | R1 | R2 | R3 | R1 | R2 | R3 | R1 | R2 | Pts |
| Pos | Driver | PUE1 | | | AHR1 | | | AHR2 | | | AHR3 | | | PUE2 | | | AHR4 | | Pts |

=== Nations Cup ===
Only the highest classified driver scored points for their nation.

| Pos | Driver | PUE | | | AHR1 | | | AHR2 | | | AHR3 | | | PUE2 | | | AHR4 | | Pts |
| Pos | Driver | R1 | R2 | R3 | R1 | R2 | R3 | R1 | R2 | R3 | R1 | R2 | R3 | R1 | R2 | R3 | R1 | R2 | Pts |
|---|---|---|---|---|---|---|---|---|---|---|---|---|---|---|---|---|---|---|---|
| 1 | Mexico | 1 | 1 | 1 | 1 | 1 | 1 | 1 | 1 | 1 | 2 | 1 | 1 | 1 | 1 | 1 | 1 | 1 | 418 |
| 2 | Colombia | | | | 5 | 4 | 2 | | | | | | | | | | DNS | 5 | 50 |
| 3 | United States | | | | | | | | | | 1 | 10† | 3 | | | | | | 41 |
| Pos | Driver | R1 | R2 | R3 | R1 | R2 | R3 | R1 | R2 | R3 | R1 | R2 | R3 | R1 | R2 | R3 | R1 | R2 | Pts |
| Pos | Driver | PUE | | | AHR1 | | | AHR2 | | | AHR3 | | | PUE2 | | | AHR4 | | Pts |
