= 2024 Formula 4 United States Championship =

Motor racing competition

The 2024 Formula 4 United States Championship season was the ninth season of the Formula 4 United States Championship, a motor racing series regulated according to FIA Formula 4 regulations and sanctioned by SCCA Pro Racing, the professional racing division of the Sports Car Club of America.

The championship switched to Ligier JS F422 car powered by Ligier Storm V4 engine.

== Teams and drivers ==
Team	No.	Driver	Rounds
(United States) US NG Racing	10	(United States) Marcelo Ponti	1
(United States) Crosslink Kiwi Motorsport	13	(United States) Barrett Wolfe	All
(United States) Crosslink Kiwi Motorsport	15	(Australia) Nicolas Stati	All
(United States) Crosslink Kiwi Motorsport	41	(New Zealand) Alex Crosbie	All
(United States) Crosslink Kiwi Motorsport	08	(Australia) Seth Gilmore	5
(Canada) Atlantic Racing Team	24	(Australia) Daniel Quimby	All
(United States) Scuderia Buell	44	(Argentina) Pablo Benites Jr.	1–3
(United States) Team Roberts Racing	46	(United States) Connor Roberts	All
(United States) MLT Motorsports	54	(United States) Lincoln Day	All
(United States) MLT Motorsports	55	(Venezuela) Alex Popow Jr.	5

== Race calendar ==
The 2024 calendar was announced on 3 October 2023 with the return of the abroad round at Canadian Tire Motorsport Park. The round at NOLA Motorsports Park on 11–14 April was cancelled due to the new car delivery delays.

Round		Circuit	Date	Pole position	Fastest lap	Winning driver	Winning team	Supporting
1	R1	(United States) Road America, Elkhart Lake	18 May	(Australia) Nicolas Stati	(Australia) Nicolas Stati	(Australia) Nicolas Stati	(United States) Crosslink Kiwi Motorsport	Formula Regional Americas Championship; SVRA
1	R2	(United States) Road America, Elkhart Lake	19 May		(Australia) Daniel Quimby	(Australia) Daniel Quimby	(Canada) Atlantic Racing Team	Formula Regional Americas Championship; SVRA
1	R3	(United States) Road America, Elkhart Lake	19 May		(New Zealand) Alex Crosbie	(Argentina) Pablo Benites Jr.	(United States) Scuderia Buell	Formula Regional Americas Championship; SVRA
2	R1	(United States) Mid-Ohio Sports Car Course, Lexington	22 June	(Australia) Nicolas Stati	(Australia) Nicolas Stati	(Australia) Nicolas Stati	(United States) Crosslink Kiwi Motorsport	Formula Regional Americas Championship; SVRA
2	R2	(United States) Mid-Ohio Sports Car Course, Lexington	23 June		race cancelled due to adverse weather conditions			Formula Regional Americas Championship; SVRA
2	R3	(United States) Mid-Ohio Sports Car Course, Lexington	23 June		(Argentina) Pablo Benites Jr.	(Australia) Daniel Quimby	(Canada) Atlantic Racing Team	Formula Regional Americas Championship; SVRA
3	R1	(United States) New Jersey Motorsports Park, Millville	27 July	(Australia) Nicolas Stati	(Australia) Nicolas Stati	(New Zealand) Alex Crosbie	(United States) Crosslink Kiwi Motorsport	Formula Regional Americas Championship; SVRA
3	R2	(United States) New Jersey Motorsports Park, Millville	28 July		(New Zealand) Alex Crosbie	(Australia) Nicolas Stati	(United States) Crosslink Kiwi Motorsport	Formula Regional Americas Championship; SVRA
3	R3	(United States) New Jersey Motorsports Park, Millville	28 July		(New Zealand) Alex Crosbie	(United States) Connor Roberts	(United States) Team Roberts Racing	Formula Regional Americas Championship; SVRA
4	R1	(Canada) Canadian Tire Motorsport Park, Bowmanville	31 August	(Australia) Daniel Quimby	(Australia) Nicolas Stati	(Australia) Daniel Quimby	(Canada) Atlantic Racing Team	Formula Regional Americas Championship
4	R2	(Canada) Canadian Tire Motorsport Park, Bowmanville	31 August		(Australia) Daniel Quimby	(Australia) Daniel Quimby	(Canada) Atlantic Racing Team	Formula Regional Americas Championship
4	R3	(Canada) Canadian Tire Motorsport Park, Bowmanville	1 September		(Australia) Daniel Quimby	(Australia) Daniel Quimby	(Canada) Atlantic Racing Team	Formula Regional Americas Championship
5	R1	(United States) Circuit of the Americas, Austin	31 October	(Venezuela) Alex Popow Jr.	(Venezuela) Alex Popow Jr.	(Venezuela) Alex Popow Jr.	(United States) MLT Motorsports	Formula Regional Americas Championship; SVRA
5	R2	(United States) Circuit of the Americas, Austin	1 November		(New Zealand) Alex Crosbie	(Venezuela) Alex Popow Jr.	(United States) MLT Motorsports	Formula Regional Americas Championship; SVRA
5	R3	(United States) Circuit of the Americas, Austin	2 November		(New Zealand) Alex Crosbie	(New Zealand) Alex Crosbie	(United States) Crosslink Kiwi Motorsport	Formula Regional Americas Championship; SVRA

== Championship standings ==
Points were awarded as follows:

Position	**1st**	**2nd**	**3rd**	**4th**	**5th**	**6th**	**7th**	**8th**	**9th**	**10th**
Points	25	18	15	12	10	8	6	4	2	1

=== Drivers' standings ===
Pos	Driver	ROA (United States)			MOH (United States)			NJM (United States)			MOS (Canada)			COA (United States)			Pts
Pos	Driver	R1	R2	R3	R1	R2	R3	R1	R2	R3	R1 (Note: Half points were awarded as the leader completed less than 50% of the original race time.)	R2	R3	R1	R2	R3	Pts
1	(Australia) Daniel Quimby	2	1	7	2	C	1	Ret	3	4	**1**	1	1	5	2	2	227.5
2	(Australia) Nicolas Stati	**1**	3	3	**1**	C	2	**2**	1	5	2	4	3	2	6	5	223
3	(United States) Connor Roberts	3	2	2	Ret	C	5	4	6	1	3	2	2	3	3	3	194.5
4	(New Zealand) Alex Crosbie	6	6	4	3	C	4	1	2	2	Ret	3	4	4	5	1	190
5	(United States) Barrett Wolfe	7	7	6	4	C	7	3	5	3	Ret	5	Ret	6	4	7	114
6	(Argentina) Pablo Benites Jr.	4	4	1	6	C	3	5	4	6							102
7	(United States) Lincoln Day	5	5	5	5	C	6	Ret	Ret	7	4	6	5	7	8	8	92
8	(Venezuela) Alex Popow Jr.													**1**	1	4	62
9	(Australia) Seth Gilmore													8	7	6	18
–	(United States) Marcelo Ponti	WD	WD	WD													–
Pos	Driver	R1	R2	R3	R1	R2	R3	R1	R2	R3	R1	R2	R3	R1	R2	R3	Pts
Pos	Driver	ROA (United States)			MOH (United States)			NJM (United States)			MOS (Canada)			COA (United States)			Pts

Colour	Result
Gold	Winner
Silver	Second place
Bronze	Third place
Green	Points classification
Blue	Non-points classification
Blue	Non-classified finish (NC)
Purple	Retired, not classified (Ret)
Red	Did not qualify (DNQ)
Red	Did not pre-qualify (DNPQ)
Black	Disqualified (DSQ)
White	Did not start (DNS)
White	Withdrew (WD)
White	Race cancelled (C)
Blank	Did not practice (DNP)
Blank	Did not arrive (DNA)
Blank	Excluded (EX)

**Bold** – Pole
Italics – Fastest Lap

=== Teams' standings ===
Each team acquires the points earned by their two best drivers in each race.

Pos	Team	Pts
1	(United States) Crosslink Kiwi Motorsport	422
2	(Canada) Atlantic Racing Team	227.5
3	(United States) Team Roberts Racing	194.5
4	(United States) MLT Motorsports	154
5	(United States) Scuderia Buell	102
–	(United States) US NG Racing	–
