= Sportscar Vintage Racing Association =

American historic motorsport organization

- Headquarters: Decatur, Georgia, US
- Website: www.svra.com

The Sportscar Vintage Racing Association (SVRA) is an American automobile club and sanctioning body that supports vintage racing in the United States. The organization was founded in 1981, and is regarded as the premier vintage racing organization in the U.S.

Along with conducting official race meets, SVRA events also include car shows, auto auctions, vendors, and other activities promoting the "car culture". The organization encourages the restoration, preservation, and racing of historically significant automobiles that are configured as closely as possible to their original design and construction.

== Venues ==
The 2021 SVRA season comprises 17 events at road courses across the country:

- Auto Club Speedway
- Brainerd International Raceway
- Circuit of the Americas
- Charlotte Motor Speedway
- Hutchinson Island
- Laguna Seca
- Lime Rock Park
- Mid-Ohio Sports Car Course
- Portland International Raceway
- Road America
- Road Atlanta
- Sebring International Raceway
- Sonoma Raceway
- The Ridge Motorsports Park
- Utah Motorsports Campus
- Virginia International Raceway
- Watkins Glen International

Former venues include:

- Amelia Island
- Roebling Road Raceway
- Tail of the Dragon
- Willow Springs International Raceway

The SVRA runs a "triple crown" for historic sports cars, the Vintage Race of Champions. These three events are the organisation's marquee events and the VROC, featuring pro-am fields, is featured in these three venues:

- Virginia International Raceway
- Indianapolis Motor Speedway (Indy Legends Charity Pro–Am race)
- Road Atlanta

The VROC is suspended for 2021 because of fan restrictions amid the COVID-19 pandemic.

== Race car groups ==
The SVRA currently recognizes 12 car groups, with criteria based on car type, age, engine displacement, horsepower, original class placement, and other various technical specifications. The organization largely requires participants to keep the cars as true to their original form as possible, however, certain modern safety modifications are required.

=== Group 1 ===
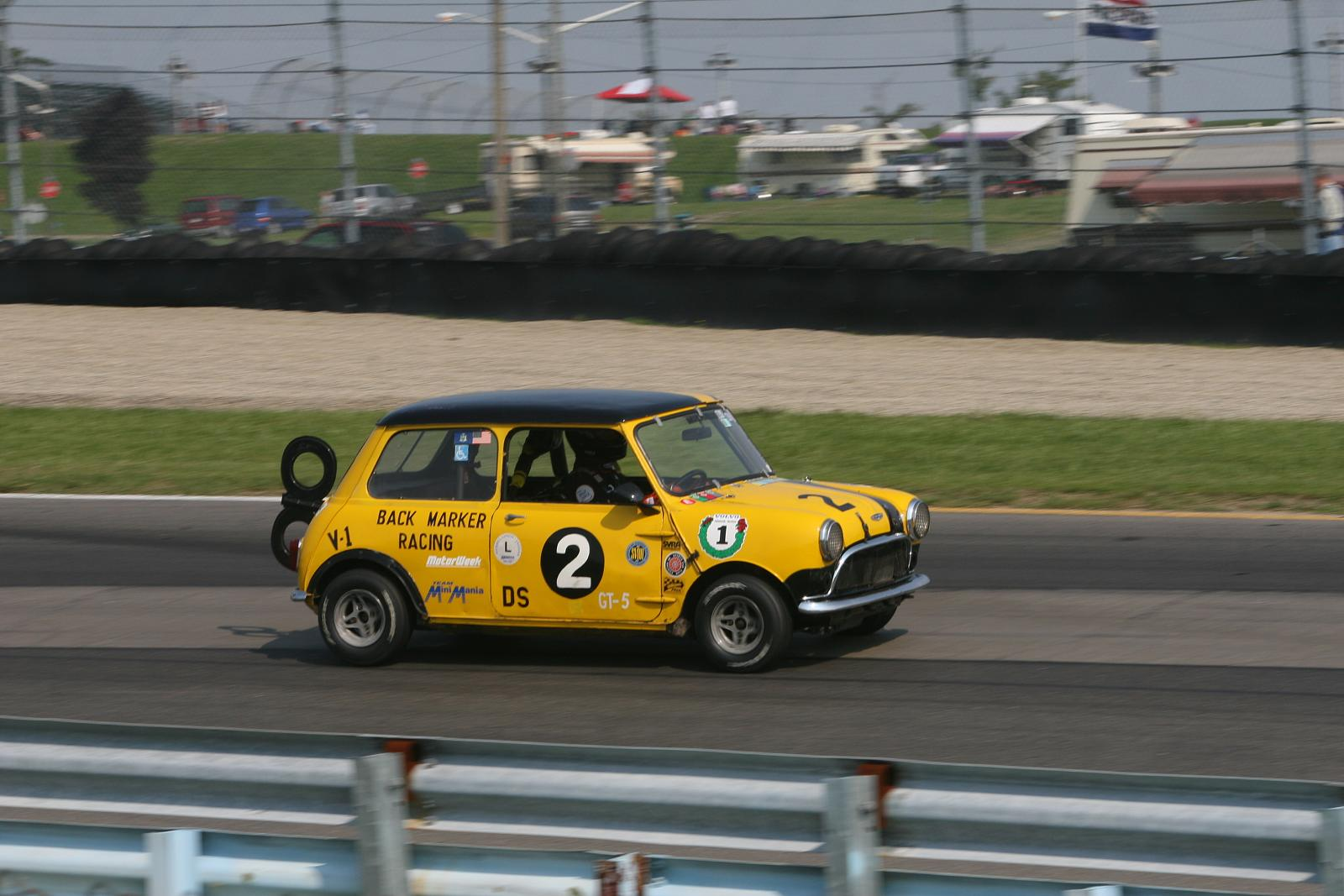
1962 Austin Cooper.

Recognized small displacement production sports cars and sedans
Examples:

- Sprite
- Midget
- Mini Cooper
- Triumph Spitfire
- Alfa Romeo Giulietta
- MGA
- Fiat-Abarth
- Lotus 7
- Select G and H-modifieds and D-Sports Racers, Formula Vee

=== Group 2 ===
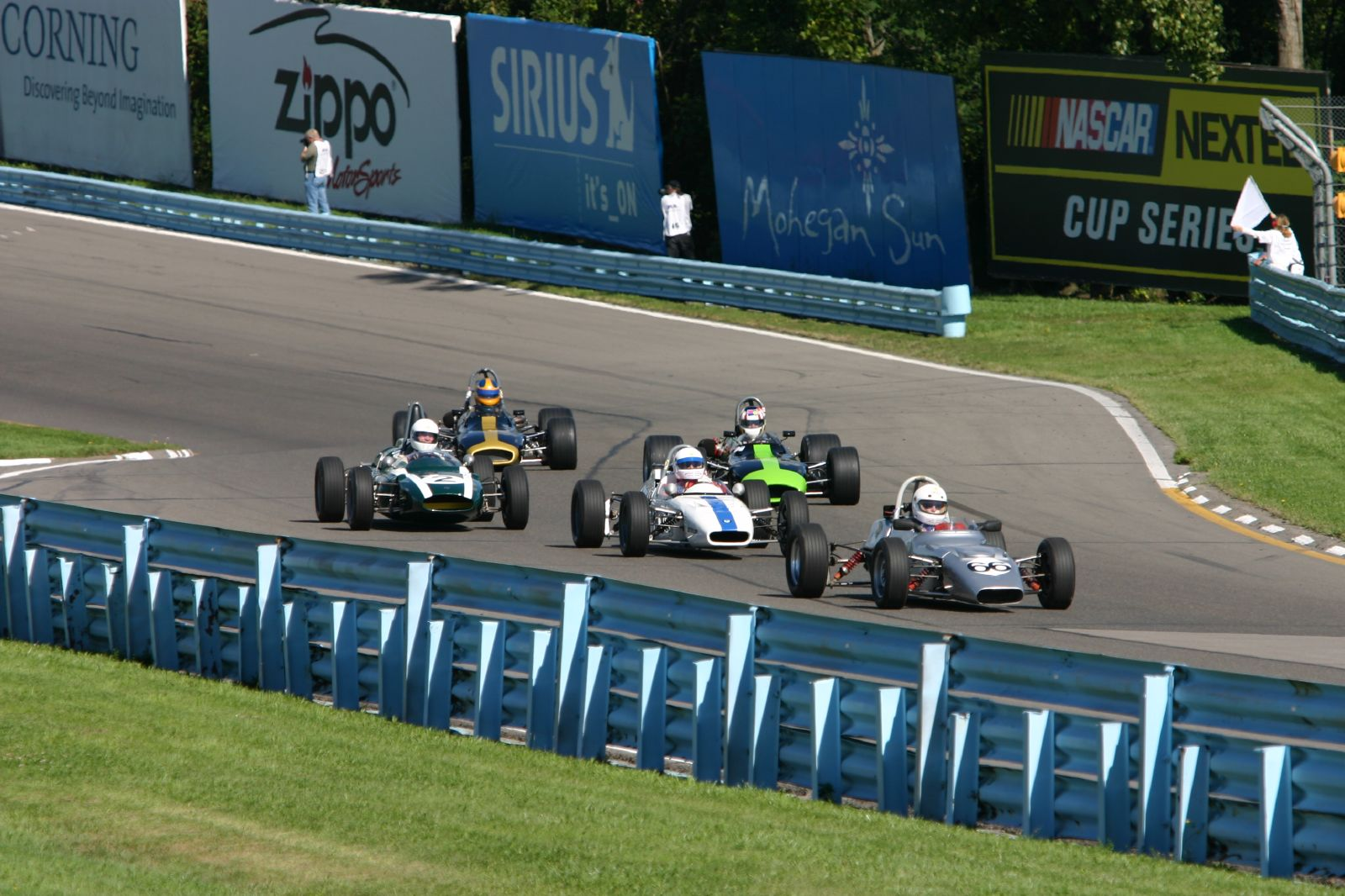
Group 2 racers at Watkins Glen.

Pre-1973 Formula cars.
Examples:

- Lotus
- Brabham
- Caldwell
- Titan
- Crosslé
- Merlyn
- Royale
- Elva
- Hawke

=== Group 3 ===
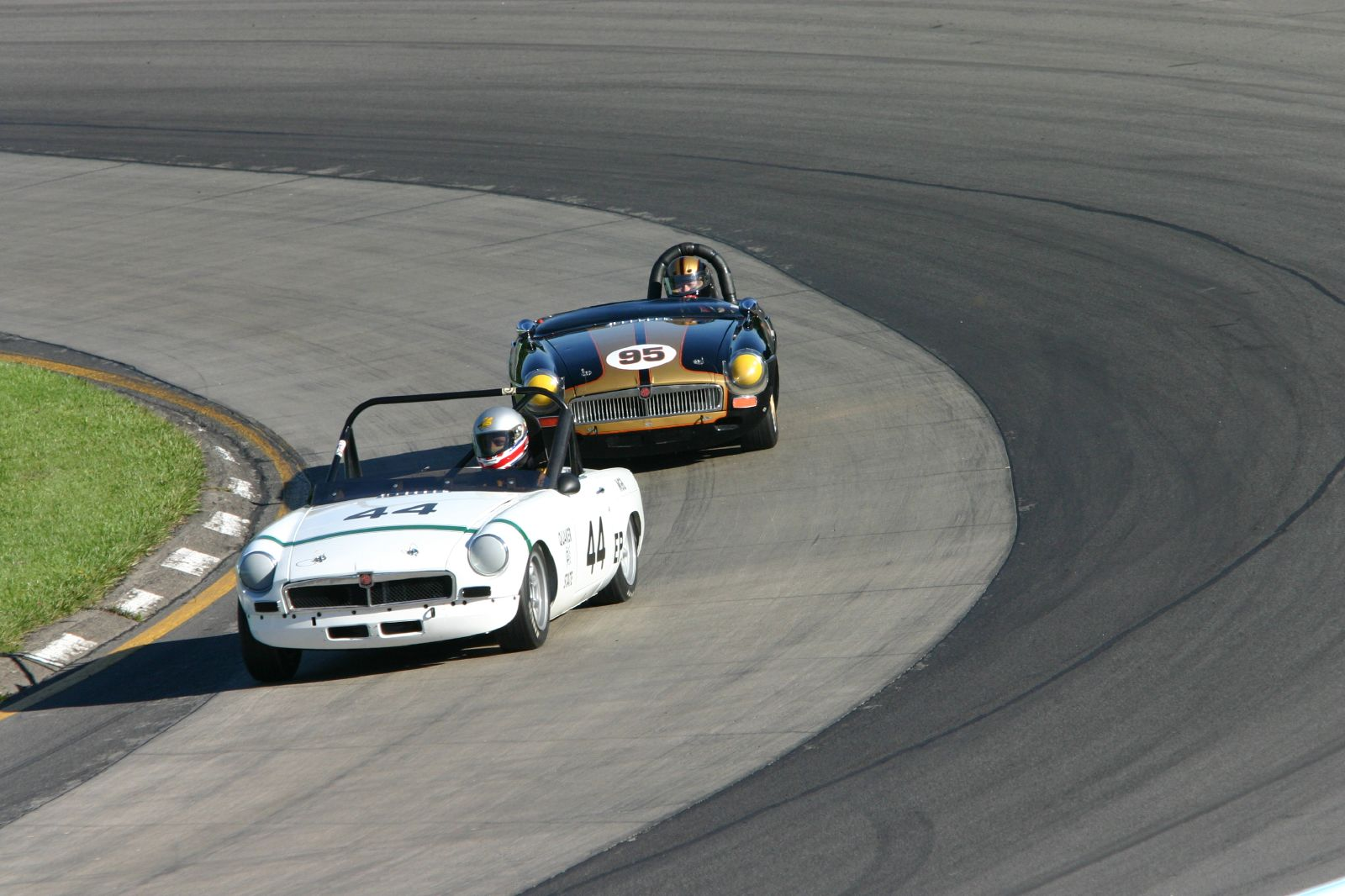
Group 3 racers at Watkins Glen.

Recognized series-produced sports cars and sedans in production prior to 1972.
Examples:

- MGB
- Triumph TR3 and TR4
- Austin-Healey 3000
- Porsche 356
- Elva Courier
- Morgan
- Daimler
- Sunbeam Alpine
- Volvo P1800

=== Group 4 ===
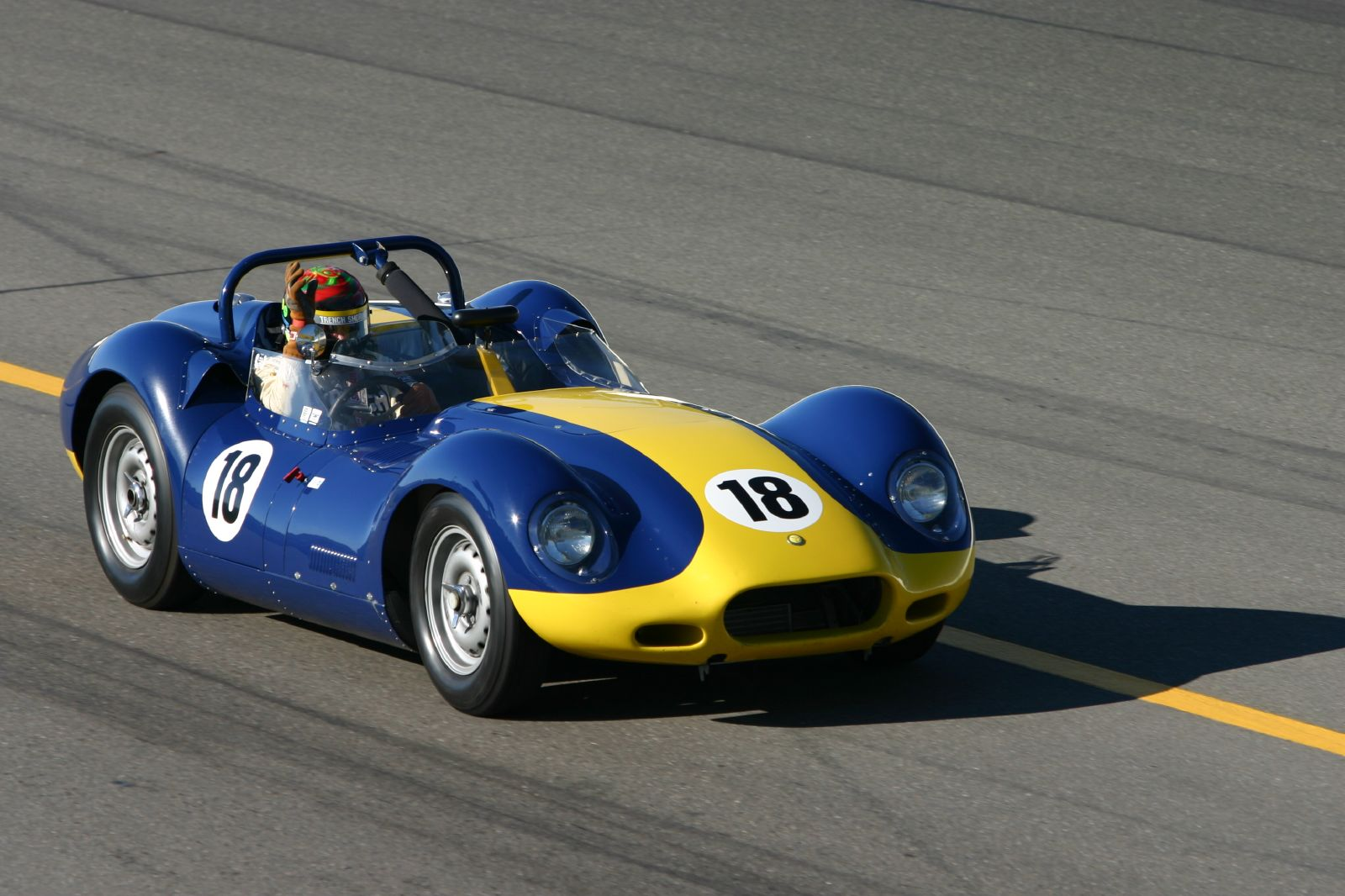
1958 Lister Jaguar.

Limited produced sports cars, racing "specials" and GT cars built or in production prior to 1960.
Examples:

- Scarab
- Devin
- Maserati
- Ferrari
- Lotus
- Jaguar XK120/140, C, D
- Lister
- Allard
- Elva
- Porsche RSK Spyder
- Cunningham

=== Group 5 ===
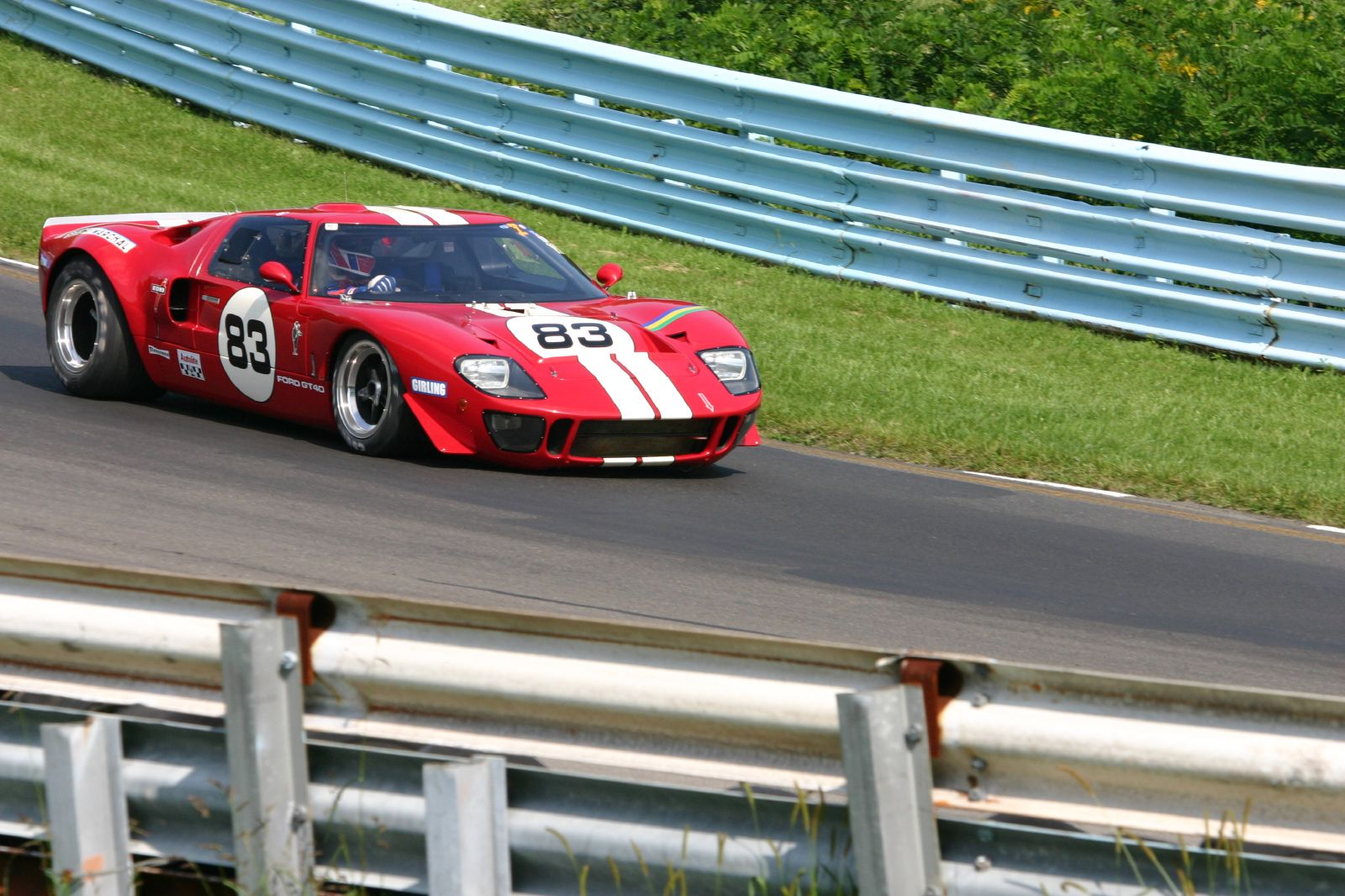
1969 Ford GT40.

World Sports Car Championship and World Manufacturer's Championship GT's and prototypes as raced between 1960 and 1972. USRRC sports cars and Can-Am cars as raced before 1969 with invited later models. Front engine "specials" as raced after 1959.
Examples:

- Lotus 23, 30, 40
- Porsche 904, 906, 907, 910
- Elva Mk 6, 7, 8
- Ford GT40
- McLaren
- Lola T70, T160
- McKee
- Chevron

=== Group 6 ===
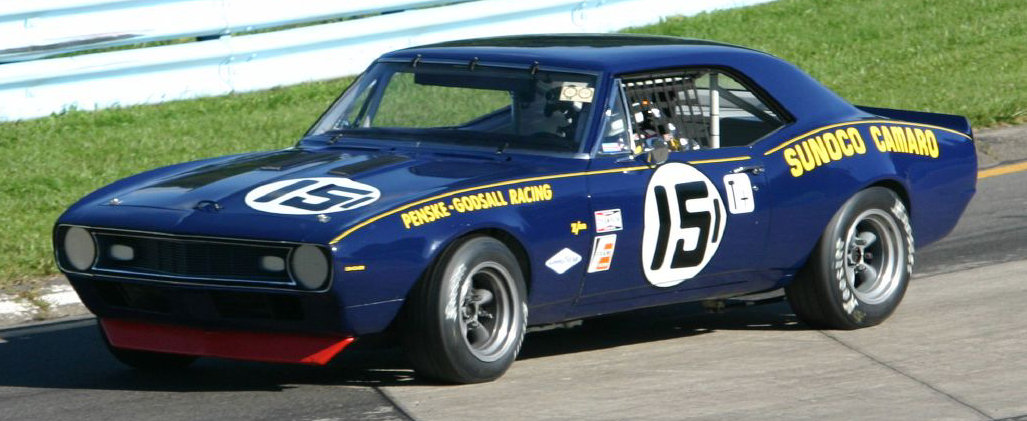
1967 Sunoco Camaro Z28.

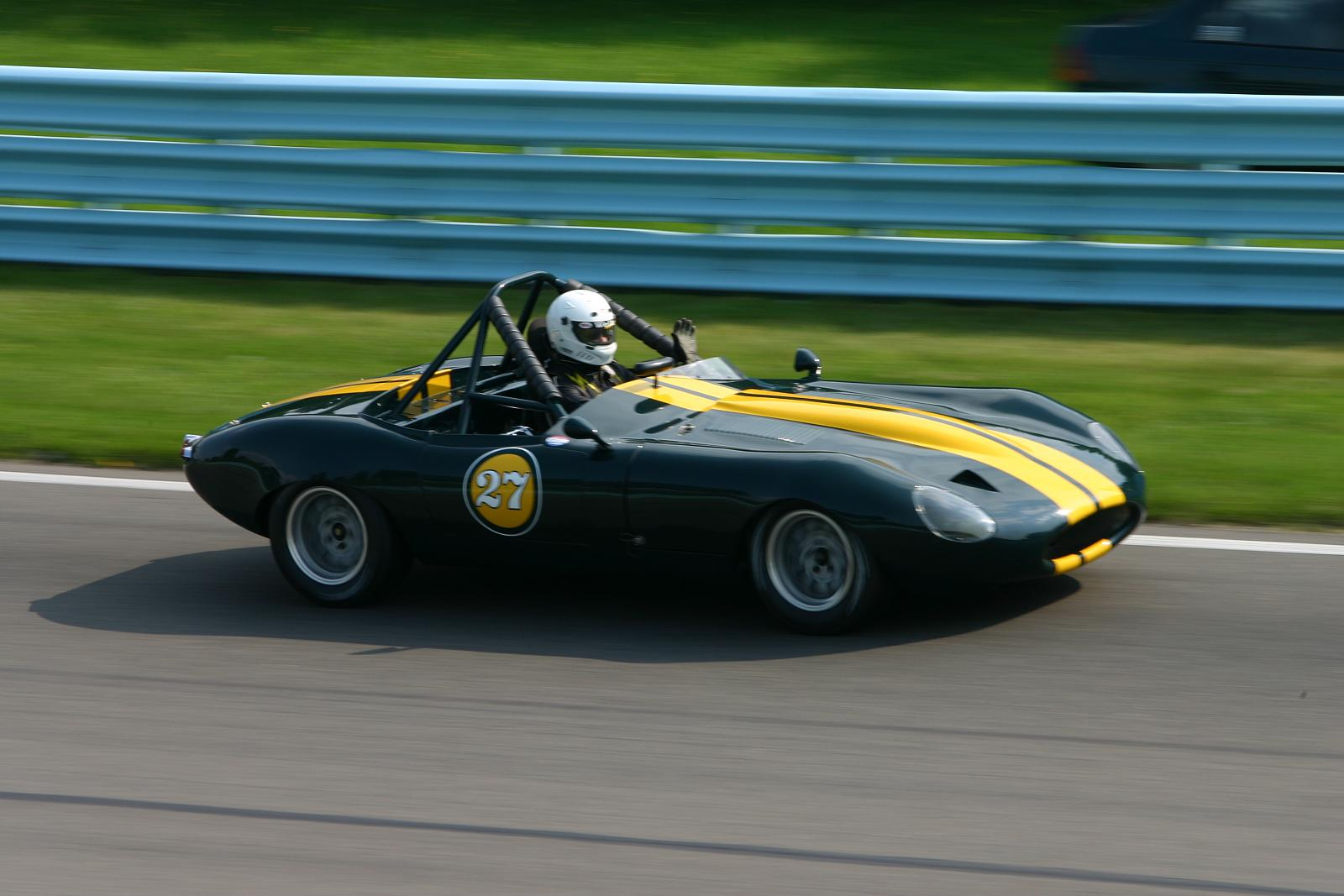
1967 Jaguar XKE.

Selected big-bore production sports cars and sedans through 1972. This is the group that is utilized for the Vintage Race of Champions (VROC) pro-am series, which includes the Indy Legends Charity Pro–Am race at the Indianapolis Motor Speedway.
Examples:

- Chevrolet Corvette
- Shelby GT-350
- AC Cobra
- Ford Mustang
- Chevrolet Camaro
- Jaguar XKE
- Plymouth Barracuda
- Mercury Cougar
- Griffith
- Porsche 911
- AMC Javelin
- AMC AMX

=== Group 7 ===
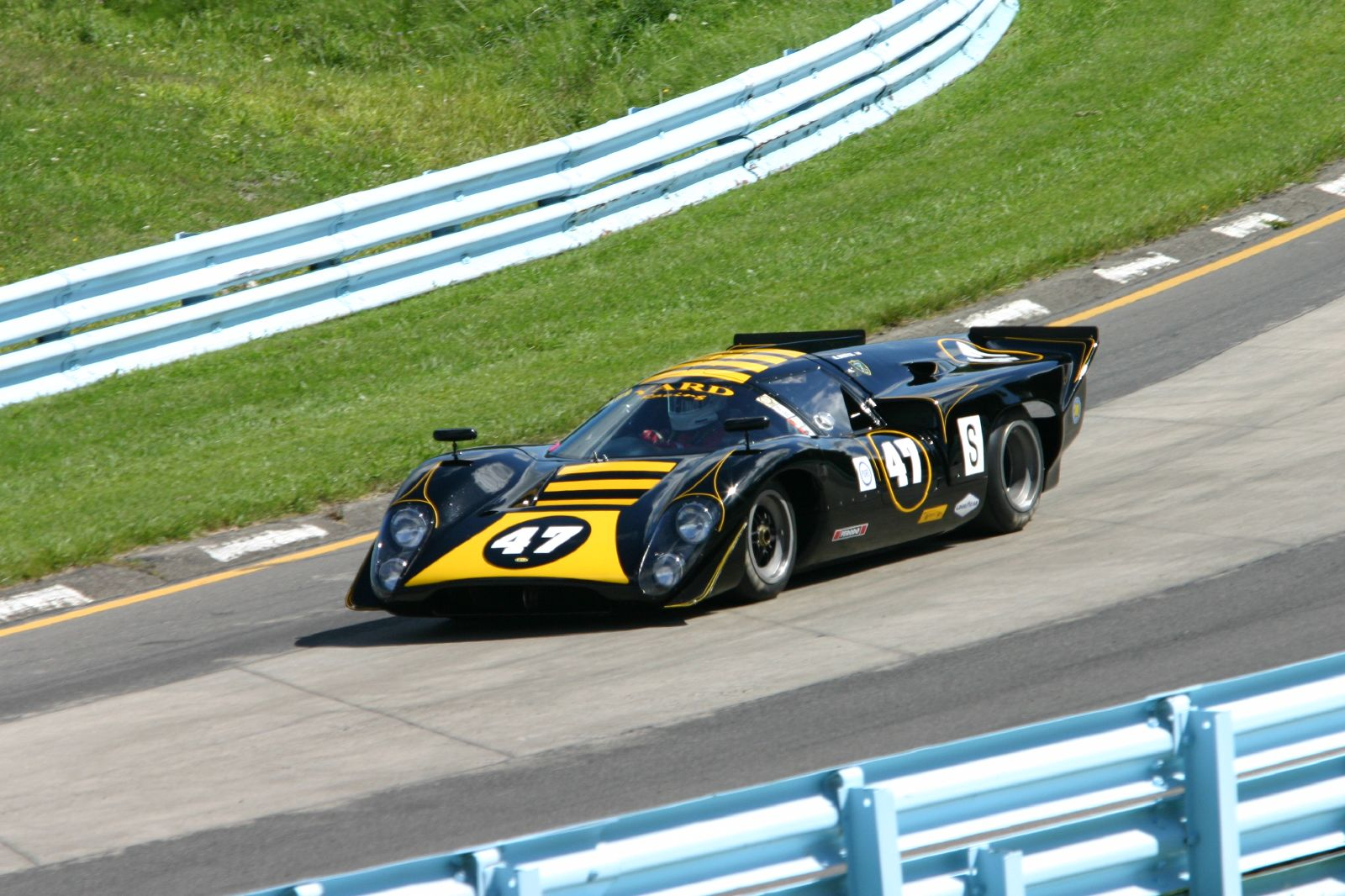
1969 Lola T70 MkIIIb.

World Championship for Makes sports cars as raced after 1970 on slicks. Under 2.0-liter sports cars as raced after 1972. Center-seat Can-Am cars. SCCA, ASR & BSR, Sports 2000.
Examples:

- McLaren
- Porsche 908, 917, 956, 962
- Lola
- Chevron
- Ferrari 312, 512
- Alfa Romeo T33
- Lancia
- Matra

=== Group 8 ===
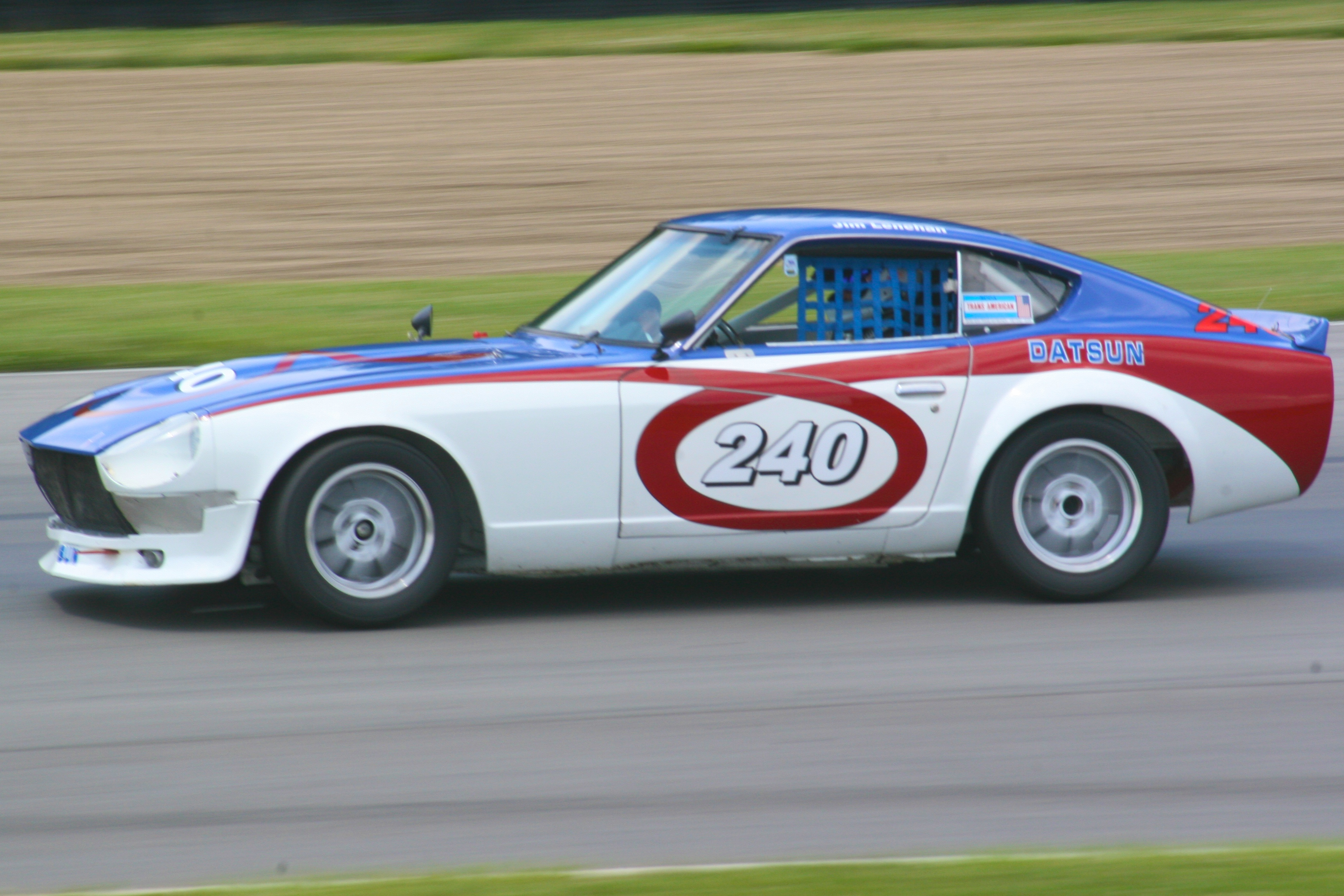
1971 Datsun 240Z.

Recognized series-produced sports cars and sedans in production prior to 1979, and later cars by invitation.
Examples:

- Lotus Super 7
- Datsun 240Z
- BMW 2002
- Sunbeam Tiger
- Porsche 911, 914, 924, 944
- Datsun 510
- Escort
- Alfa Romeo GTV

=== Group 9 ===
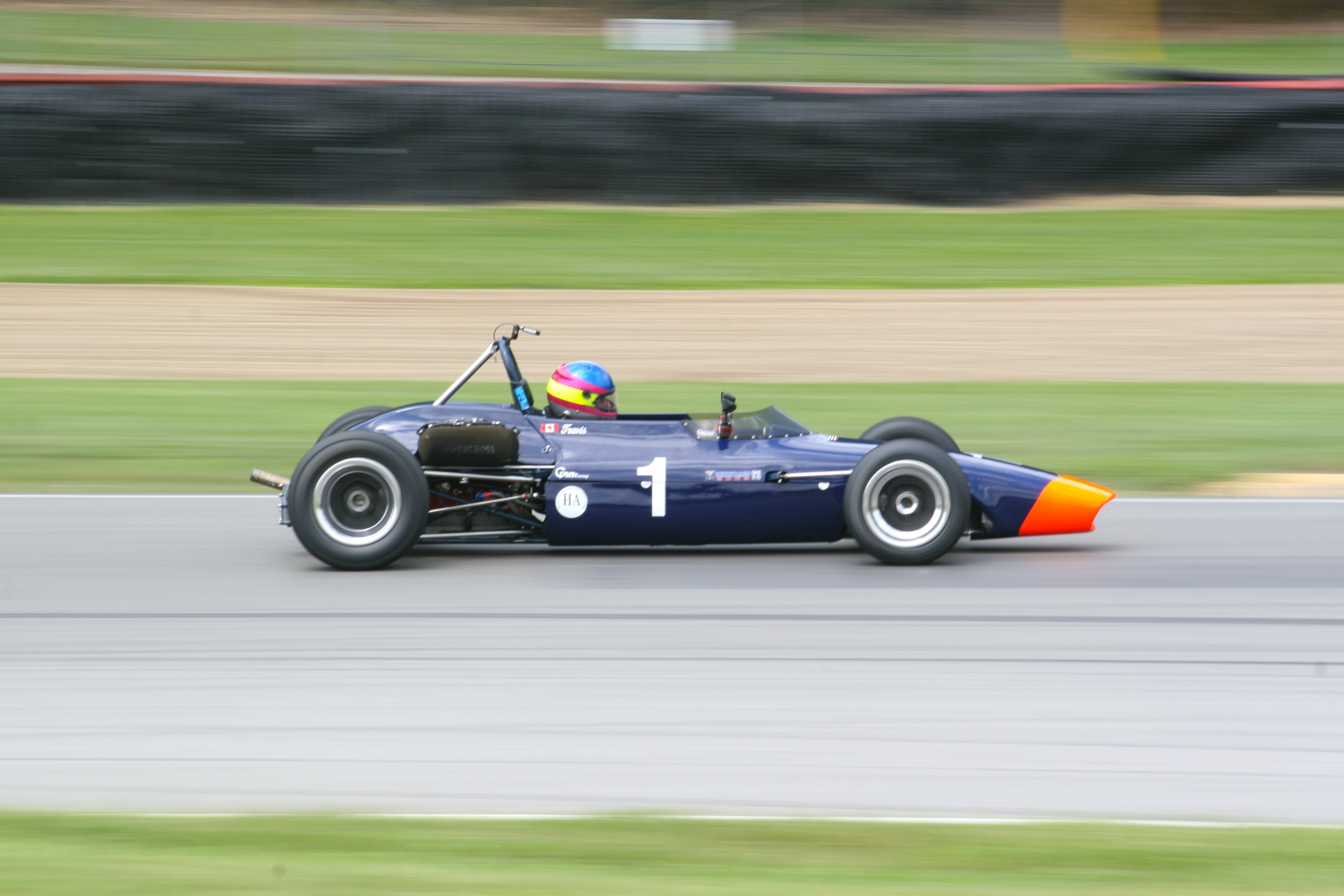
1970 Chevron B17B.

Wings and slicks formula cars complying with SVRA post-1973 formula car regulations.
Examples:

- Formula 1 and Indy Lights
- Formula 5000
- Formula 2
- Formula Atlantic & Formula B (1600cc)
- Formula Super Vee (1600cc, air & water cooled)
- Formula Continental and Formula 3 (1100cc)

=== Group 10 ===
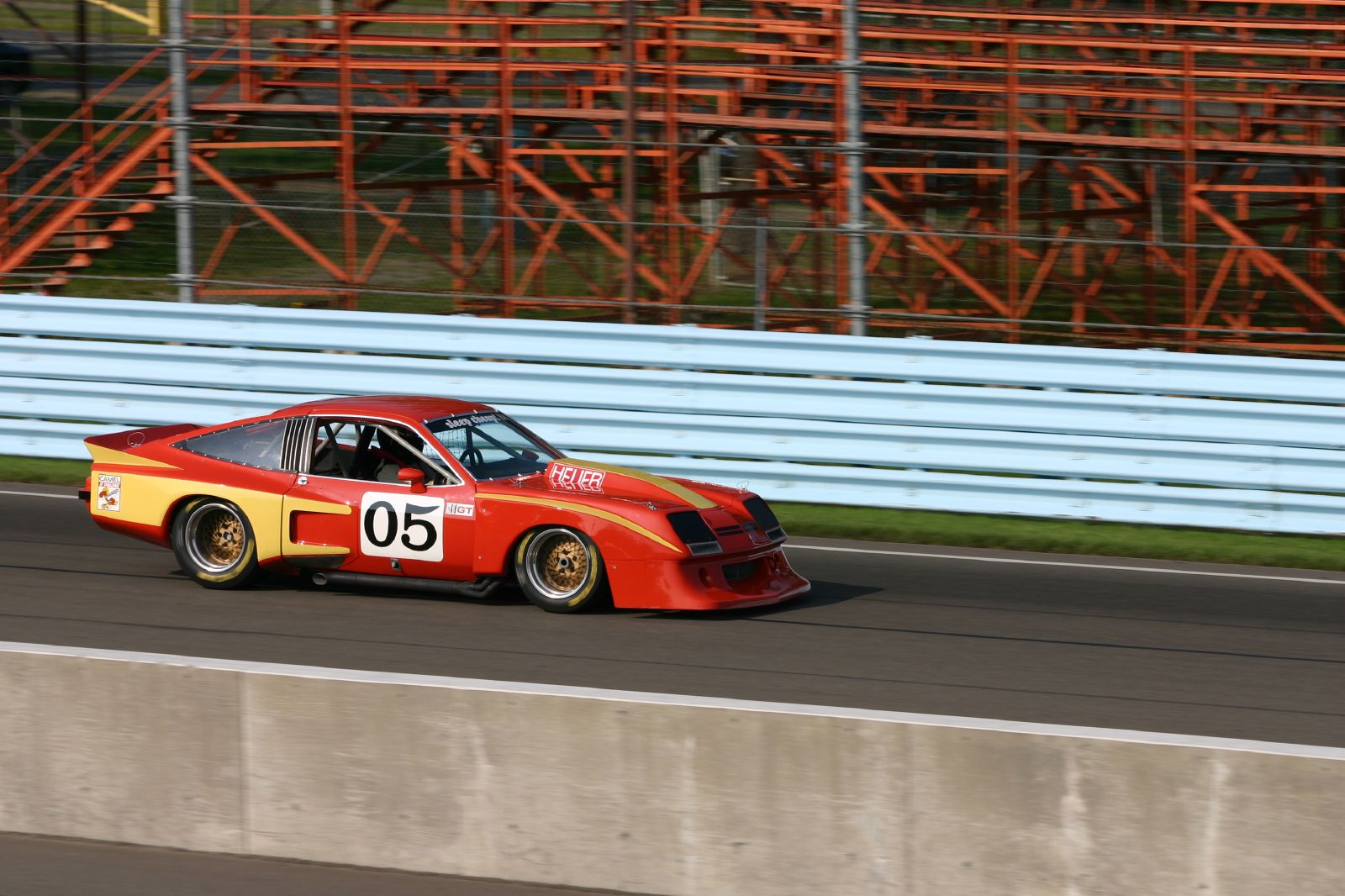
1975 Chevrolet Monza.

Selected IMSA and FIA/GT sports cars and sedans as raced between 1973 and 1999. NASCAR Cup/Busch series stock cars. Production-based contemporary cars.
Examples:

- Porsche RSR, 934, 935, 964, 993
- Chevrolet Corvette
- Chevrolet Monza
- Chevrolet Camaro
- Ford Mustang T/A
- Nissan
- Toyota
- Mazda RX-7

=== Group 11 ===
GTP/Group C, ALMS, PSCR, WSC, Grand Am, and WeatherTech Championship prototype cars as raced from 1981 to five years before the current date. SVRA may permit cars that are deemed obsolete by rules, such as the 2003-16 Daytona Prototype chassis, made obsolete after the 2016 season, before the five-year rule is applied. Tube frame Trans Am and IMSA GTS, GTO and FIA-GT cars as raced from 1981 to specified cut-off date (five years, but SVRA may permit cars once their GT3/GT4 homologation has expired to participate). Production-based contemporary cars based on performance history as raced from 1999 to 5 years prior to calendar year or homologation has expired (car cannot be used in current sportscar racing). Can-Am and A Sports Racing cars as raced after 1967 on slicks, over 6.0 Liters. Center-seat Can-Am cars on slicks over 5.0 Liters.
Examples:

- Aston Martin AMR1
- Intrepid
- Audi R8
- Daytona Prototype 2003-16 (now legal per SVRA)
- Ford Mustang
- Trans Am
- Oldsmobile Aurora
- Pontiac Grand Am
- Porsche GT2 and Cup

=== Group 12 ===
Select GT sports cars and sedans raced between 1973 and 5 years prior to today's date or when homlogation has expired. These are Production-based cars such as the IMSA Michelin Pilot Challenge or any other stock / prepared racing series once their homologation has expired. Early IMSA GTO and GTU small bore cars will be accepted on an individual basis. SVRA may permit a car no longer permitted in the Pilot Challenge or other similar series to participate in SVRA without regards to the five-year rule.
Examples:

- Chevrolet Corvette
- Dodge Viper
- Ford Mustang
- Panoz,
- Datsun Z cars
- Nissan ZX
- various BMW, Porsche and Ferrari models

== Annual Awards ==
- Driver of the Year
- Rookie of the Year
- Most Improved Driver
- Professional Mechanic
- Amateur Mechanic
- Bob Prouty Award
- BUBBA Award
- Bucher/Decker Trophy
- Charlie Gibson Award
- Collier Cup
- Cornett Cup
- Glanville Cup
- Handy Cup
- Hugh Kleinpeter Award
- MGT Cup
- Sports Racer Challenge
- VIR Founders Cup

== United States Vintage Racing National Championship ==
On October 25–27, 2013, SVRA held the inaugural United States Vintage Racing National Championship at the Circuit of the Americas near Austin, Texas. 500 vintage race cars competed in twelve classes with a national champion crowned in each class.
