= 2025 F1600 Championship Series =

15th season of the F1600 Championship Series

2025 F1600 season

Season
- Races: 21
- Start date: March 21
- End date: August 17

Awards
- Drivers' champion: (United States) Ayrton Cahan
- Manufacturers' Cup: (United States) Piper

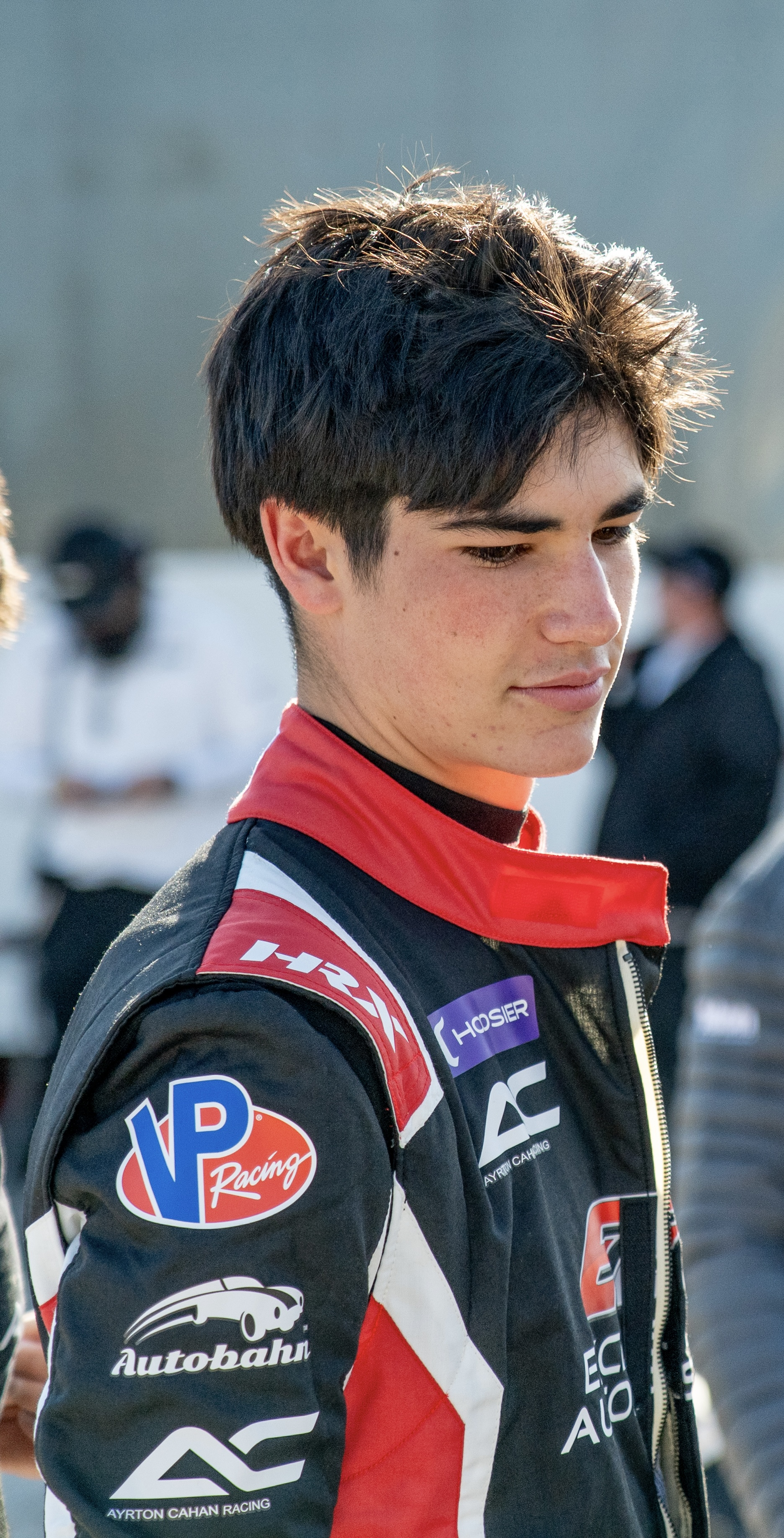
Ayrton Cahan won the 2025 championship driving for Eric Langbein Racing.

The 2025 F1600 Championship Series season was the fourteenth season of the F1600 Championship Series.

The prior year's winner was Mateo Naranjo from Team Pelfrey.

The 2025 F1600 Championship had the tightest title race to date as Ayrton Cahan narrowly surpassed his brother and teammate, Gabriel Cahan, and Wesley Gundler by only 2 points.

David Adorno dominated the F1600 Masters class to claim the season title; his fifth-place finish in the general standings marked the highest rank for a Masters competitor in over ten years.

== Drivers and teams ==
Pro Division
Team/Sponsor	No.	Drivers	Class	Rounds	Chassis	Engine
Brian Graham Racing	0	(Canada) Calum Dunbar	R	13–15	Piper	Honda
Brian Graham Racing	2	(Canada) Calum Dunbar	R	10–12	Piper	Honda
Brian Graham Racing	4	(Canada) Calum Dunbar	R	4–6	Piper	Honda
Brian Graham Racing	4	(Canada) Parker Gill	R	10–12	Piper	Honda
Brian Graham Racing	1	(United States) Michael Dowden		13–15	Piper	Honda
Brian Graham Racing	5	(United States) Michael Dowden		10–12	Piper	Honda
Dietz Motorsports	02	(United States) James Dietz	M	4–6	Van Diemen	
Dietz Motorsports	18	(United States) Robert Dietz		4–6	Van Diemen	Honda
Rehm Racing	03	(United States) Greg Peluso	M	1–3, 18–20	Van Diemen	
Rehm Racing	9	(United States) Greg Peluso	M	7–9	Spectrum	
Rehm Racing	83	(United States) Greg Peluso	M	10–12	Van Diemen	
Rehm Racing	9	(United States) Robert Stowell	M	13–15, 18–20	Spectrum	
Rehm Racing	12	(United States) Bob Reid	M	All	Spectrum	
Rehm Racing	75	(United States) Brian Farnham	R	7–9	Citation	
Eric Langbein Racing	3	(United States) Ayrton Cahan		10–12	Van Diemen	
Eric Langbein Racing	22	(United States) Ayrton Cahan		1–9, 13–20	Piper	
Eric Langbein Racing	5	(United States) John Thompson	M	4–9, 13–20	Piper	
Eric Langbein Racing	11	(United States) Gabriel Cahan	R	All	Piper	
(United States) K-Hill Motorsports	4	(Japan) Taisei Murakami	R	16–17	Mygale	Honda
(United States) K-Hill Motorsports	23	(United States) Harbir Dass	R	4–6	Mygale	Honda
(United States) K-Hill Motorsports	46	(United States) Wesley Gundler	R	All	Mygale	Honda
(United States) K-Hill Motorsports	98	(Mexico) Juan Pablo Garcia	R	1–9	Mygale	Honda
(United States) K-Hill Motorsports	414	(United States) Abigail Froehlich	R	1–9, 16–20	Mygale	Honda
John Dole Racing	8	(United States) John Dole	G M	13–15	Ray FF	
John Dole Racing	91	(United States) John P Dole		1–6, 13–15	Mygale	
(United States) Raceworks	10	(United States) John Kierce		1–3, 7–9, 13–15, 18–20	Van Diemen	
(United States) Raceworks	111	(United States) Christopher Kierce		1–3, 7–9, 13–15, 18–20	Spectrum	
Wright Racing	10	(United States) James Hankin	G M	4–6	Ray FF	
Wright Racing	94	(United States) Robert Wright	G M	7–9	Ray FF	
(United States) Drivers Services	18	(United States) Gary Gecelter	M	1–3, 7–15	Spectrum	
(United States) Drivers Services	21	(United States) Dave Petzko	M	7–9, 13–20	Spectrum	
CT Motorsports	41	(United States) Karsten Defonce		1–9	Piper	
CT Motorsports	45	(United States) Dillion Defonce		1–9	Piper	
Bob Perona Motorsport	73	(United States) Roman McCurdy	R	1–3	Piper	
Bob Perona Motorsport	113	(United States) Robert Perona	M	10–12	Mygale	
DBM Racing	1	(United States) Steve Oseth	G M	1–3	Citation	
Steel Services	72	(United States) Steve Oseth	G M	18–20	Piper	
Steel Services	72	(United States) Tom Schwietz	G M	4–9	Piper	
Partstop Spectrum	2	(United States) Mike Scanlan	M	1–9, 13–20	Spectrum	
(United States) Auriana Racing	3	(United States) Joe Colasacco	M	1–6, 13–18	Van Diemen	
Jah autosports	6	(United States) Jack Haydu	R	4–10	Van Diemen	
Jah autosports	94	(United States) Jack Haydu	R	11–12	Ray FF	
Steele Carreras	7	(United States) Timothy Steele		13–15	Van Diemen	
Citation Engineering	8	(United States) Miles Crabbe	R	1–3, 7–9	Citation	
Iron Rock Motorsports	15	(United States) Chace Supplee	R	1–12, 16–20	Piper	
New Method Motorsport	17	(United States) Cooper Travis	R	All	Spectrum	
Flex-Ten Motorsports	24	(United States) Chris Horan		4–9	Van Diemen	Honda
(United States) AntiSpeed	26	(United States) Charles Anti		7–9	Van Diemen	
Practical Precision Engineering	30	(United States) Will Velkoff		7–9, 13–20	Van Diemen	
Morgan's Collision Center	31	(United States) Scott Rubenzer	M	1–12, 18–20	Spectrum	
DMVSTOP RACING	33	(United States) David Adorno	M	All	Mygale	
Home Tech Consultants	41	(United States) Robert Albani	M	16–17	Mygale	
Cordova Racing	42	(United States) Joe Parsons	M	13–20	Spectrum	
Kingham Racing	47	(United States) Phil Kingham	M	1–15	Spectrum	
Bob Gross Racing / Averill Racing Stuff	62	(United States) Robert Gross	M	4–6, 10–15	Piper	
ThermaMasters	85	(United States) David Livingston Jr.	M	1–15	Spectrum	
FRP F1600 Championship Series 2025

Icon	Class
M	Masters
R	Rookie
G	Guest

== Schedule ==
Rd.	Date	Track	Location
1	March 21–23	Michelin Raceway Road Atlanta	(Georgia (U.S. state)) Braselton, Georgia
2	March 21–23	Michelin Raceway Road Atlanta	(Georgia (U.S. state)) Braselton, Georgia
3	March 21–23	Michelin Raceway Road Atlanta	(Georgia (U.S. state)) Braselton, Georgia
4	April 25–27	Mid-Ohio Sports Car Course	Lexington, Ohio
5	April 25–27	Mid-Ohio Sports Car Course	Lexington, Ohio
6	April 25–27	Mid-Ohio Sports Car Course	Lexington, Ohio
7	May 30 – June 1	Pittsburgh International Race Complex	Wampum, Pennsylvania
8	May 30 – June 1	Pittsburgh International Race Complex	Wampum, Pennsylvania
9	May 30 – June 1	Pittsburgh International Race Complex	Wampum, Pennsylvania
10	June 27–29	Road America	Plymouth, Wisconsin
11	June 27–29	Road America	Plymouth, Wisconsin
12	June 27–29	Road America	Plymouth, Wisconsin
13	July 11–13	Watkins Glen International	(New York (state)) Dix, New York
14	July 11–13	Watkins Glen International	(New York (state)) Dix, New York
15	July 11–13	Watkins Glen International	(New York (state)) Dix, New York
16	August 1–3	New Jersey Motorsports Park	Millville, New Jersey
17	August 1–3	New Jersey Motorsports Park	Millville, New Jersey
18	August 15–17	Summit Point Motorsports Park	Summit Point, West Virginia
19	August 15–17	Summit Point Motorsports Park	Summit Point, West Virginia
20	August 15–17	Summit Point Motorsports Park	Summit Point, West Virginia
References: Formula Race Promotions Announces 2025 Schedule

== Results and performance summaries ==
Round	Circuit	Location	Date	Pole position	Fastest lap	Winning driver	Masters class winner	Supporting
1	Michelin Raceway Road Atlanta	(Georgia (U.S. state)) Braselton, Georgia	March 22	(United States) Karsten Defonce	(United States) Ayrton Cahan	(United States) Ayrton Cahan	(United States) Joe Colasacco	F2000 Championship Series; Atlantic Championship; SVRA Sprint Series; Trans-Am Series; International GT; Prototype Sprint Series Association; Ginetta Challenge Race Series
2	Michelin Raceway Road Atlanta	(Georgia (U.S. state)) Braselton, Georgia	March 22		(United States) Roman McCurdy	(United States) Karsten Defonce	(United States) David Livingston Jr.	F2000 Championship Series; Atlantic Championship; SVRA Sprint Series; Trans-Am Series; International GT; Prototype Sprint Series Association; Ginetta Challenge Race Series
3	Michelin Raceway Road Atlanta	(Georgia (U.S. state)) Braselton, Georgia	March 23		(United States) Dillion Defonce	(United States) Dillion Defonce	(United States) David Livingston Jr.	F2000 Championship Series; Atlantic Championship; SVRA Sprint Series; Trans-Am Series; International GT; Prototype Sprint Series Association; Ginetta Challenge Race Series
4	Mid-Ohio Sports Car Course	Lexington, Ohio	April 26	(United States) Dillion Defonce	(United States) Dillion Defonce	(United States) Ayrton Cahan	(United States) Scott Rubenzer	F2000 Championship Series; Atlantic Championship; Formula Vee Challenge Cup Series; Formula Ford Challenge Series; FE2 Challenge
5	Mid-Ohio Sports Car Course	Lexington, Ohio	April 27		(United States) Ayrton Cahan	(United States) Ayrton Cahan	(United States) Joe Colasacco	F2000 Championship Series; Atlantic Championship; Formula Vee Challenge Cup Series; Formula Ford Challenge Series; FE2 Challenge
6	Mid-Ohio Sports Car Course	Lexington, Ohio	April 27		(United States) Karsten Defonce	(United States) Gabriel Cahan	(United States) John Thompson	F2000 Championship Series; Atlantic Championship; Formula Vee Challenge Cup Series; Formula Ford Challenge Series; FE2 Challenge
7	Pittsburgh International Race Complex	Wampum, Pennsylvania	May 31	(United States) Gabriel Cahan	(United States) Wesley Gundler	(United States) Gabriel Cahan	(United States) John Thompson	F2000 Championship Series; Atlantic Championship; SVRA Sprint Series; Formula Vee Challenge Cup Series; Optima Challenge
8	Pittsburgh International Race Complex	Wampum, Pennsylvania	June 1		(United States) Cooper Travis	(United States) Wesley Gundler	(United States) David Adorno	F2000 Championship Series; Atlantic Championship; SVRA Sprint Series; Formula Vee Challenge Cup Series; Optima Challenge
9	Pittsburgh International Race Complex	Wampum, Pennsylvania	June 1		(United States) Chris Horan	(United States) Chris Horan	(United States) David Adorno	F2000 Championship Series; Atlantic Championship; SVRA Sprint Series; Formula Vee Challenge Cup Series; Optima Challenge
10	Road America	Plymouth, Wisconsin	June 28	(United States) Wesley Gundler	(United States) Phil Kingham	(United States) Gabriel Cahan	(United States) Robert Perona	F2000 Championship Series; Atlantic Championship; Ultimate Street Car Association; Trans-Am Series; Prototype Sprint Series Association
11	Road America	Plymouth, Wisconsin	June 29		(Canada) Parker Gill	(United States) Wesley Gundler	(United States) David Adorno	F2000 Championship Series; Atlantic Championship; Ultimate Street Car Association; Trans-Am Series; Prototype Sprint Series Association
12	Road America	Plymouth, Wisconsin	June 29		(United States) Cooper Travis	(United States) Gabriel Cahan	(United States) Robert Perona	F2000 Championship Series; Atlantic Championship; Ultimate Street Car Association; Trans-Am Series; Prototype Sprint Series Association
13	Watkins Glen International	(New York (state)) Dix, New York	July 12	(United States) Wesley Gundler	(United States) Timothy Steele	(United States) Ayrton Cahan	(United States) Joe Colasacco	F2000 Championship Series; Atlantic Championship; SVRA Sprint Series; Trans-Am Series; Skip Barber Formula Race Series; Ginetta Challenge Race Series
14	Watkins Glen International	(New York (state)) Dix, New York	July 13		(United States) Ayrton Cahan	(United States) Gabriel Cahan	(United States) David Adorno	F2000 Championship Series; Atlantic Championship; SVRA Sprint Series; Trans-Am Series; Skip Barber Formula Race Series; Ginetta Challenge Race Series
15	Watkins Glen International	(New York (state)) Dix, New York	July 13		(United States) Ayrton Cahan	(United States) Timothy Steele	(United States) David Adorno	F2000 Championship Series; Atlantic Championship; SVRA Sprint Series; Trans-Am Series; Skip Barber Formula Race Series; Ginetta Challenge Race Series
16	New Jersey Motorsports Park	Millville, New Jersey	August 2	(United States) Ayrton Cahan	(United States) Ayrton Cahan	(United States) Gabriel Cahan	(United States) Joe Colasacco	F2000 Championship Series; Atlantic Championship; Formula Regional Americas Championship; Ligier Junior Formula Championship; Formula 4 United States Championship; SVRA Sprint Series
17	New Jersey Motorsports Park	Millville, New Jersey	August 3		(United States) Wesley Gundler	(United States) Gabriel Cahan	(United States) Joe Colasacco	F2000 Championship Series; Atlantic Championship; Formula Regional Americas Championship; Ligier Junior Formula Championship; Formula 4 United States Championship; SVRA Sprint Series
18	Summit Point Motorsports Park	Summit Point, West Virginia	August 16	(United States) Ayrton Cahan	(United States) Ayrton Cahan	(United States) Wesley Gundler	(United States) John Thompson	F2000 Championship Series; Atlantic Championship; SVRA Sprint Series; Formula Vee Challenge Cup Series
19	Summit Point Motorsports Park	Summit Point, West Virginia	August 17		(United States) Cooper Travis	(United States) Wesley Gundler	(United States) David Adorno	F2000 Championship Series; Atlantic Championship; SVRA Sprint Series; Formula Vee Challenge Cup Series
20	Summit Point Motorsports Park	Summit Point, West Virginia	August 17		(United States) Wesley Gundler	(United States) Wesley Gundler	(United States) David Adorno	F2000 Championship Series; Atlantic Championship; SVRA Sprint Series; Formula Vee Challenge Cup Series

== Scoring system ==
Points are awarded to the top twenty-five classified drivers, and the top drivers who are able to achieve the Pole Position or the Fastest Lap during the qualify session are awarded with corresponding +3 and +2 bonus points.

The Season Championship will recognize only each driver's best 18 of 21 race results including all bonus points earned.

Points are awarded using the following system:

Position	1st	2nd	3rd	4th	5th	6th	7th	8th	9th	10th	11th	12th	13th	14th	15th	16th	17th	18th	19th	20th	21st	22nd	23rd	24th	25th+	DNF
Points	50	42	37	34	31	29	27	25	23	21	19	17	15	13	11	10	9	8	7	6	5	4	3	2	1	1

Guest drivers are ineligible to score points.

If a guest driver finishes in first position, the second-placed finisher will receive 50 points. The same goes for every other points scoring position. Thus, if three guest drivers place fourth, fifth and sixth, the seventh-placed finisher will receive 34 points and so forth – until the twenty-eighth-placed finisher receives the final point.

== Driver standings ==
Pos	Driver	RAT			MOH			PITT			RA			WGI			NJMP		SP			Pts	Drop Points
1	(United States) Ayrton Cahan	1	2	3	1	1	2	2	3	7	3	2	12	1	4	17	**3**	3 (Note: Contact between 22 & 46, Final Lap, Turn 12. 22 found in violation. Loss of 10 Race Points)	**2**	3	3	**764**	709
2	(United States) Gabriel Cahan	3	3	5	3	2	1 (Note: 11 & 41 found in violation of: 1.6.17.3: AVOIDABLE CONTACT & 1.6.17.4: RACING ROOM. 11 - Loss of 5 Race points & purse.)	**1**	4	3	1	4	1	4	1	18	1	1	4	4	4	**781**	708
3	(United States) Wesley Gundler	8	10	10	4	5	3	3	1	2	**2**	1	3	**2**	2	2	2 (Note: 46 found in violation of 1.6.17.3: AVOIDABLE CONTACT. Loss of 10 Race Points)	7	1	1	1	**774**	707
4	(United States) Chace Supplee	9	22	20 (Note: 15 found in violation of: 1.6.17.3: AVOIDABLE CONTACT. Loss of 10 Race points.)	9	7	13	4	5	4	6	8	8				4	2	3	2	2	**464**	468
5	(United States) David Adorno	10	9	17	16	9	DNF	7	7	5	8	6	4	10	7	3	10	6	7	6	6	**480**	460
6	(United States) Cooper Travis	DNF	15	7	13	17	22	5	2	DNF	7	5	10	6	3	7	14	5	5	5	5	**458**	452
7	(United States) Joe Colasacco	4	6	9	8	8	5							7	9	4	5	4				316	316
8	(United States) David Livingston Jr.	7	5	4	11	15	7	8	17	10	DNS	13	6	14	12	8						303	303
9	(United States) John Thompson				10	10	4	6	11	15				23	14	11	6	9	6	8	9	300	300
10	(United States) Bob Reid	16	16	12	17	16	11	13	12	12	9	12	11	16	16	13	7	10	17	10	11	**317**	289
11	(United States) Phil Kingham	11	23 (Note: 47 found in violation of: 1.6.17.5: SAFE PASS. Loss of 15 Race points.)	Wth	15	DNF	10	10	8	6	13	7	5	8	8	6						**270**	281
12	(United States) Scott Rubenzer	13	7	DNF	7	12	24	11	9	9	DNF	11	15						8	9	7	262	262
13	(United States) Will Velkoff							12	10	11				15	15	10	9	8	9	7	8	223	223
14	(United States) Karsten Defonce	**5**	1	2	2	3	20	DNS	DNS	DNS												213	213
15	(United States) Dillion Defonce	2	4	1	**5**	4	21	DNS	DNS	DNS												203	203
16	(United States) Christopher Kierce	15	13	13				14	19	14				11	10	20			10	18	10	174	174
17	(United States) Mike Scanlan	18	17	DNF	21	19	15	18	20	19				18 (Note: 2 found in violation of 1.6.17.3: AVOIDABLE CONTACT. Loss of 10 Race Points)	18	15	11	11	15	14	14	**158**	160
18	(United States) John Kierce	21	19	14				21	18	20				12	11	12			12	11	12	153	153
19	(United States) Chris Horan				12	6	6	25	13	1												144	144
20	(Canada) Calum Dunbar				14	13	8				DNF	10	7	13	24	9						143	143
21	(United States) John P Dole	14	11	8	19	DNF	19							5	6	19						141	141
22	(United States) Michael Dowden										5	DNF	9	9	13	5						124	124
23	(United States) Timothy Steele													3	5	1						120	120
24	(United States) Dave Petzko							20	15	18				22	19	16	12	DNS	13	12	13	112	112
25	(Mexico) Juan Pablo Garcia	17	14	11	18	20	18	15	14	13												106	106
26	(United States) Robert Perona										4	9	2									99	99
27	(United States) Roman McCurdy	6	8	6																		85	85
28	(United States) Abigail Froehlich	23	21	19	25	24	16	23	25	23							16	DNS	14	15	15	85	85
29	(United States) Gary Gecelter	19	24	15				16	22	DNF	10	16	Wth	19	20	DNF						83	83
30	(United States) Greg Peluso	20	20	18				19	16	17	11	15	DNF						DNS	DNS	DNS	82	82
31	(United States) Charles Anti							9	6	8												77	77
32	(United States) Robert Stowell													17	17	14			11	13	17	74	74
33	(United States) Harbir Dass				6	11	9															71	71
34	(United States) Joe Parsons													20	23	22	15	14	16	16	16	69	69
35	(United States) Robert Gross				24	22	17				12	DNF	14	DNF	22	DNF						54	54
36	(United States) Jack Haydu				23	23	12	24	24	22	14	14	DNF				Wth	Wth				47	47
37	(Canada) Parker Gill										DNF	3 (Note: 4 found in violation of 1.6.17.3: AVOIDABLE CONTACT. 4 brought in for Stewards Impound. Penalized 10 Race points and purse.)	13									45	45
38	(United States) Robert Albani																8	12				42	42
39	(United States) Miles Crabbe	22	18	16				22	21	21												39	39
40	(Japan) Taisei Murakami																13	13				30	30
41	(United States) James Dietz				22	21	14															23	23
42	(United States) Robert Dietz				20	14	23															22	22
43	(United States) Brian Farnham							DNF	27	16												12	12
Drivers ineligible for points
	(United States) Steve Oseth	12	12	Wth															18	17	18		
	(United States) Tom Schwietz				DNF	18	DNF	17	26	DNF													
	(United States) John Dole													21	21	21							
	(United States) Robert Wright							DNS	23	DNF													
	(United States) James Hankin				Wth	25	25																
Pos	Driver	RAT			MOH			PITT			RA			WGI			NJMP		SP			Pts	Drop Points
References: FRP Official Points Standings & Championship Series Central & Race Monitor

Color	Result
Gold	Winner
Silver	2nd-place finish
Bronze	3rd-place finish
Green	Top 5 finish
Light Blue	Top 10 finish
Dark Blue	Other flagged position
Purple	Did not finish (DNF)
Brown	Withdrew (Wth)
Pink	Unqualified Car (CNQ)
Black	Disqualified (DSQ)
White	Did Not Start (DNS)
White	Race abandoned (C)
Blank	Did not participate

**In-line notation**
**Bold**	Pole position (3 points)
Italics	Fastest lap of the race (2 points)

Master of the Year
Masters

== Incident reports ==
- Road Atlanta 2025 – Incident Review/Penalty Report – REVISED
- Mid-Ohio 2025 – Incident Review/Penalty Report
- PIRC 2025 – Incident Review/Penalty Report
- Road America 2025 – Incident Review/Penalty Report
- WGI 2025 – Incident Review/Penalty Report
- NJ 2025 – Incident Review/Penalty Report Revised – 8/15/25

== Live streaming on YouTube ==
Race 3 of Road Atlanta: Vintage Racing from the Mission Foods Road Atlanta SpeedTour 2025 (Sunday)
Race 2 and 3 of Road America: LIVE: Road America SpeedTour (Sunday)
Race 2 of Watkins Glen International: LIVE: Watkins Glen SpeedTour (Sunday)

== See also ==
- 2025 F2000 Championship Series
