= Charles Hilpertshauser =

American architect

- Born: December 21, 1861; Herman, Sheboygan County, Wisconsin, U.S.
- Died: December 22, 1910 (aged 49); Chicago, Illinois, U.S.
- Occupation: Architect
- Spouse: Minnie Buckel
- Children: 2 daughters

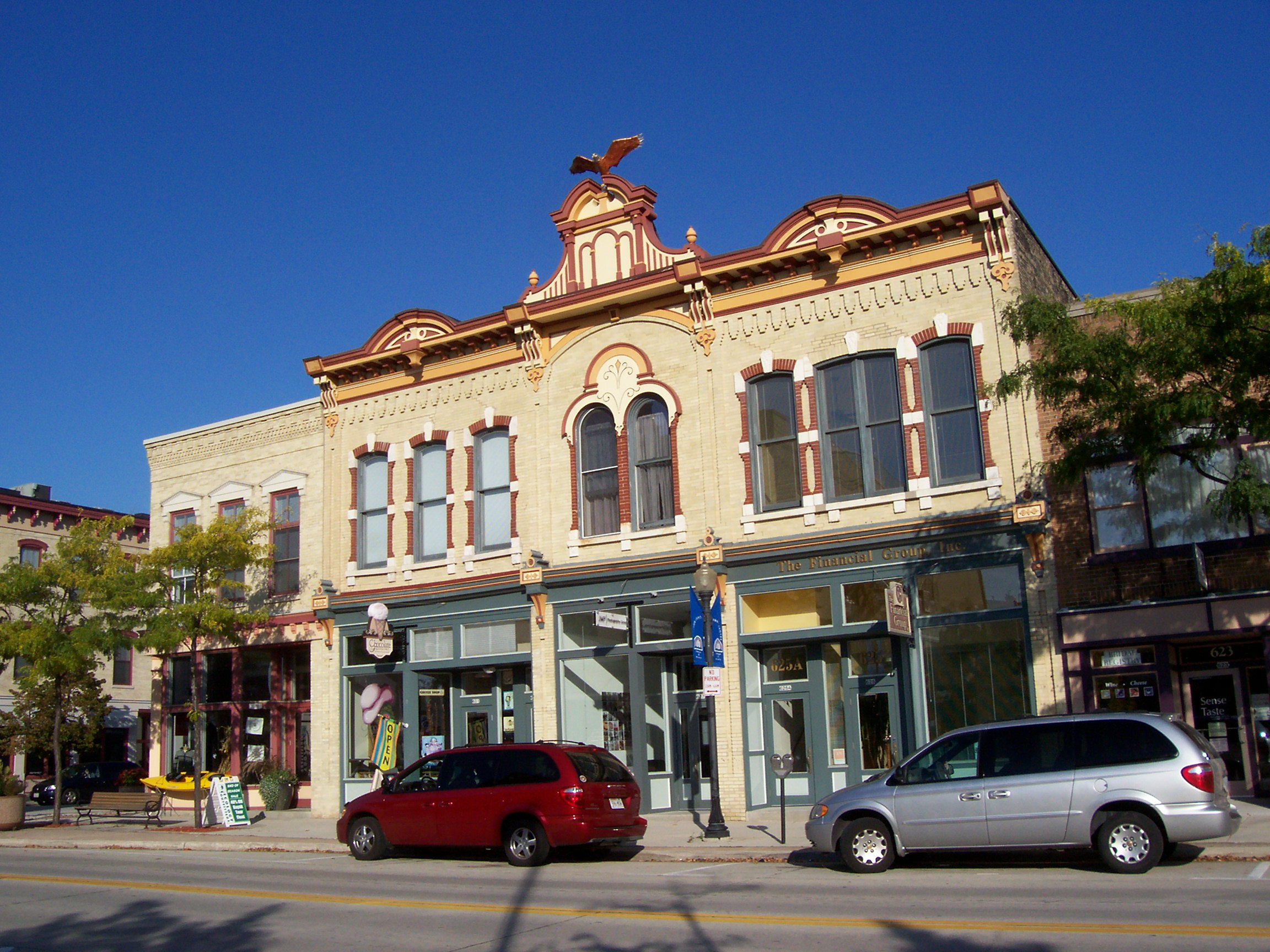
The Henry and Charles Imig Block in Sheboygan, designed by Hilpertshauser.

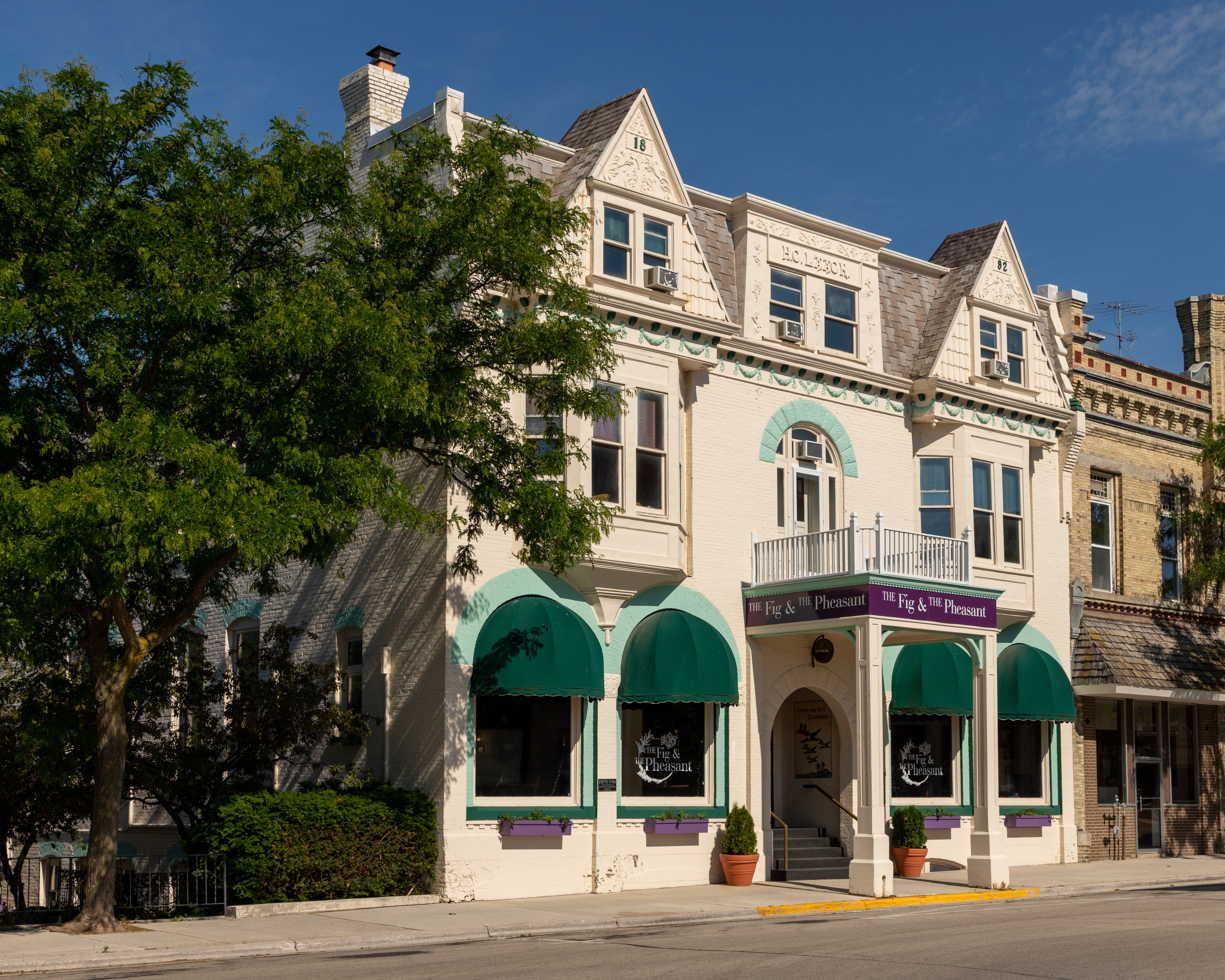
Hotel Laack in Plymouth, designed by Hilpertshauser.

Charles Hilpertshauser (December 21, 1861 – December 22, 1910) was an American architect. He designed more than 300 buildings in Sheboygan County, Wisconsin, including the NRHP-listed Henry and Charles Imig Block in Sheboygan and Hotel Laack in Plymouth.

== Life ==
Hilpertshauser was born on December 21, 1861, in Herman, Sheboygan County, Wisconsin. He grew up in Sheboygan, and he was trained as an architect in Chicago.

Hilpertshauser opened an office in Sheboygan. He designed many buildings in Wisconsin, especially in Sheboygan County, where he designed over 300 buildings between 1885 and 1910. They included the Bodenstein Bros. Block and the NRHP-listed Henry and Charles Imig Block in Sheboygan, the Theological College in Franklin, and the NRHP-listed Hotel Laack in Plymouth.

Hilpertshauser married Minnie Buckel in 1885, and they had two daughters. He was a member of the German Reformed Church, and a Freemason. He died of cancer on December 22, 1910, in Chicago, Illinois, at age 49. His grandson, Richard Miller, became an architect in New York City.
