= Hotel Laack =

Historic building in Plymouth, Wisconsin, US

- U.S. National Register of Historic Places
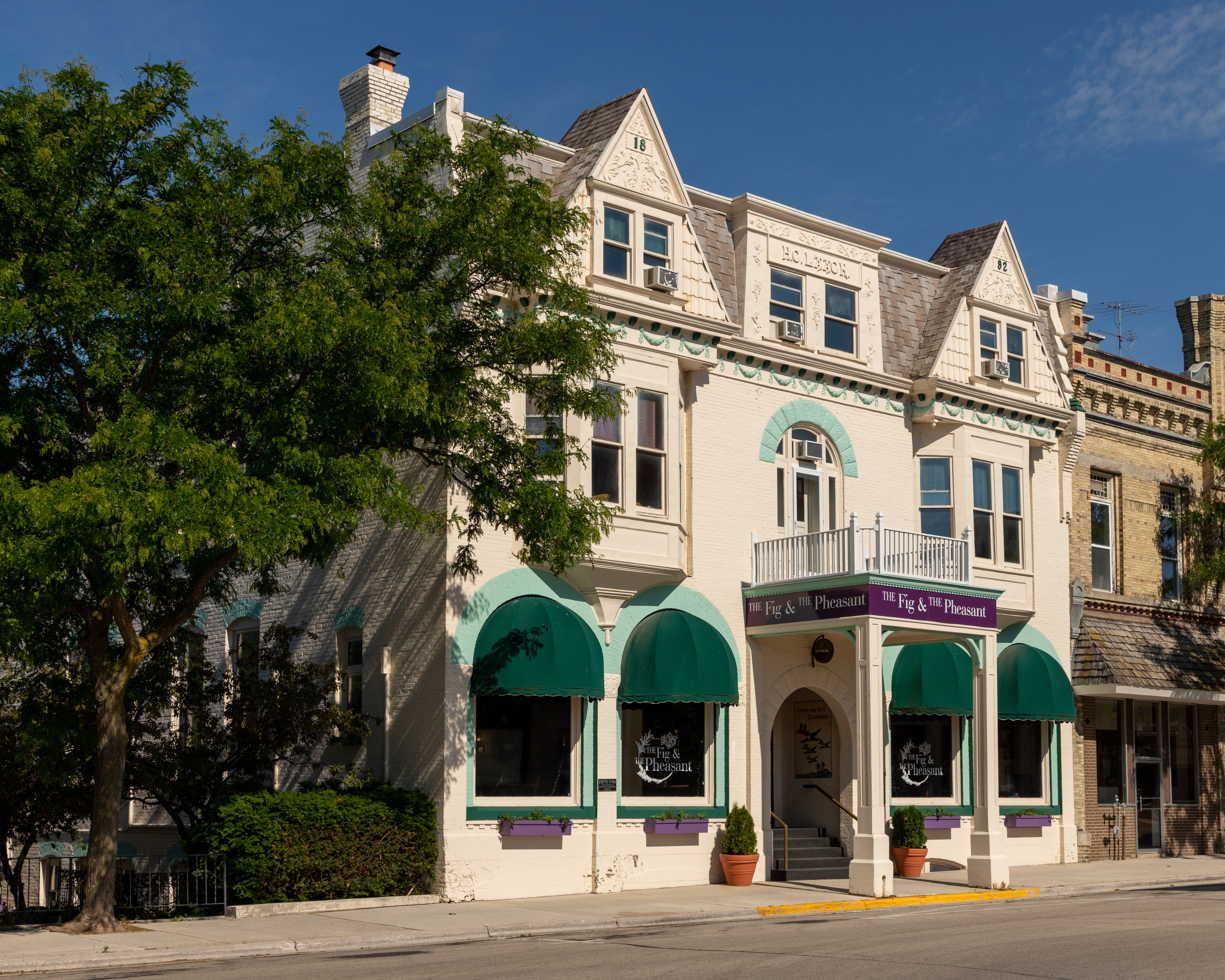
- Hotel Laack in 2020

- Location within Wisconsin
- Location: 52 Stafford Street, Plymouth, Wisconsin
- Coordinates: 43°44′50″N 87°58′39″W
- Area: 0.1 acres (0.040 ha)
- Built: 1892; 134 years ago
- Architect: Charles Hilpertshauser
- Architectural style: Queen Anne
- NRHP reference No.: 85003095
- Added to NRHP: December 2, 1985

Hotel Laack is a historic three-story building in Plymouth, Wisconsin. It was built as a hotel for businessman Henry Christopher Laack in 1892, and designed in the Queen Anne style by architect Charles Hilpertshauser. The son of a German immigrant, Laack first built houses and commercial buildings in Plymouth, including a Gothic Revival structure behind the hotel in 1889. When Laack built the Hotel Laack three years later, he already owned Commercial House, another hotel and saloon. The building has been listed on the National Register of Historic Places since December 2, 1985.
