= Sargento =

American food company

Sargento Foods Inc.
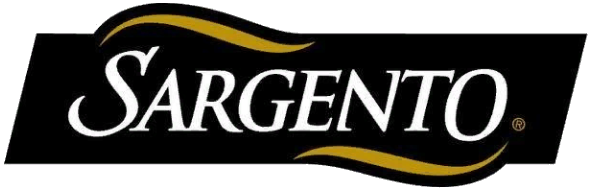
- Type: Private
- Industry: Cheese and food production, marketing
- Founded: 1953; 73 years ago in Plymouth, Wisconsin
- Founder: Leonard Gentine and Joseph Sartori
- Headquarters: Plymouth, Wisconsin, United States
- Key people: Louie Gentine, CEO
- Products: Packaged food, Dairy products
- Revenue: Sales are over $1.8 billion annually
- Owner: The Gentine family
- Number of employees: 2,500 (2024 estimate)
- Website: www.sargento.com

Sargento Foods Inc. is an American food producer best known for its cheese. It was founded in 1953 in Plymouth, Wisconsin, by Leonard Gentine and Joseph Sartori. Sargento is one of the largest privately held companies in the United States, and is one of the country's largest retail cheese companies. The company offers profit sharing, tuition reimbursement and benefits for its employees. The company has been a sponsor in American motorsports for many years; for example, it is prominently displayed on Road America raceway.

== History ==
The company name is a combination of Sartori and Gentine, with an "o" added to make the name sound Italian, as the company specialized in Italian-style cheeses. In 1949, at a poker game, Gentine, who previously owned a funeral home, ordered 100 cheese gift boxes but discovered that most of the cheese providers only did truck size orders. He would offer cheese companies for their surplus cheese. At first, the process was completely by hand, from slicing to waxing to packing. Eventually, 2 machines, 1 for slicing and 1 for waxing were made.

== Corporate overview ==
Sargento has 5 different locations, all of them being in Wisconsin. It has over 2,500 employees in total.

== Products ==
Sargento was the first company to sell pre-packaged sliced cheese (1953), to sell pre-packaged shredded cheeses (1958), and the first to develop zippered packaging for its cheeses (1986). The company also produces and markets specialty cheeses, which it purveys on its website and in catalogs. Additional products include sauces, snack cheeses and snack foods, and the company also manufactures custom cheese and food products for corporate clients.

In early 2017, Sargento recalled seven cheeses for possible Listeria monocytogenes contamination.

== Works ==
- Faley, Tom (April 10, 2018). Treated Like Family: How an Entrepreneur and His "Employee Family" Built Sargento, a Billion-Dollar Cheese Company. Center Street. ISBN 978-1478992868.
- Sargento Foods (2012). Pizza Recipes. Publications International. ISBN 978-1450852111.
- Sargento Mac and Cheese Recipes. Publications International. 2010. ISBN 978-1450801089.

== See also ==
- List of cheesemakers
- List of dairy product companies in the United States
