= Theodore Benfey =

American politician

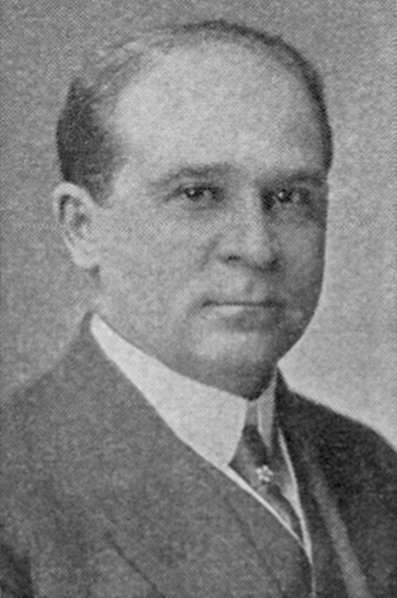

Member of the Wisconsin State Senate
- In office 1916–1924

Personal details
- Born: Theodor Benfey; June 11, 1871 Plymouth, Wisconsin, US
- Died: March 13, 1935 (aged 63) Sheboygan, Wisconsin, US
- Political party: Republican
- Occupation: Soldier, politician

Theodore Benfey (June 11, 1871 - March 13, 1935) was a member of the Wisconsin State Senate.

== Biography ==
Benfey was born on June 11, 1871, in Plymouth, Wisconsin. He graduated from high school in Sheboygan, Wisconsin. During the Spanish–American War, he served with the United States Army.

He died in Sheboygan on March 13, 1935.

== Political career ==
Benfey was elected to the Senate in 1916. Additionally, he was District Attorney of Sheboygan County, Wisconsin from 1899 to 1905 and a member of the Sheboygan City Council. He was a Republican.
