= Henry and Charles Imig Block =

- Imig, Henry and Charles, Block
- U.S. National Register of Historic Places
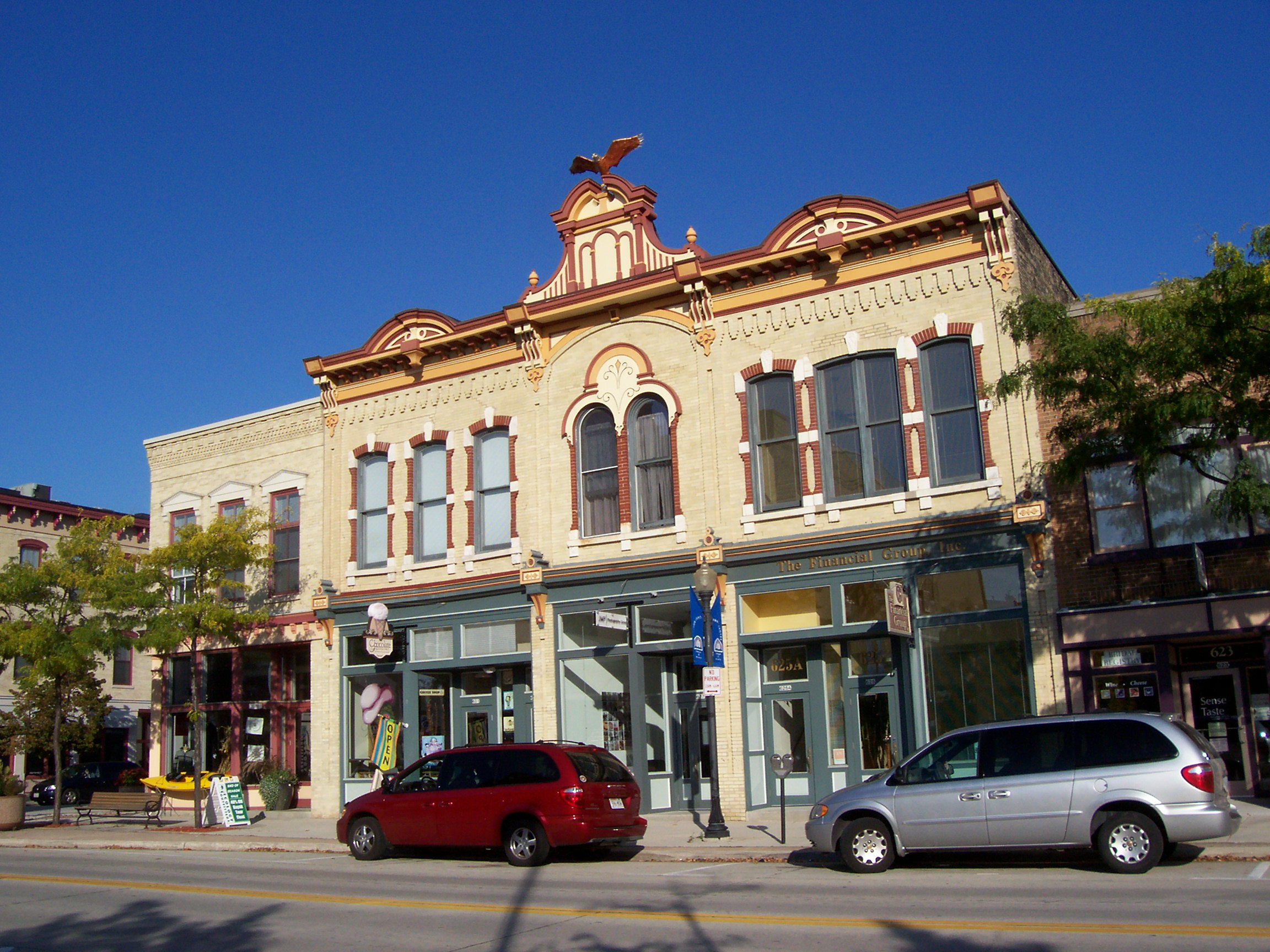
- The building in 2008

- Location within Wisconsin
- Location: 625-629 North Eighth Street, Sheboygan, Wisconsin
- Coordinates: 43°45′11″N 87°42′45″W
- Area: less than one acre
- Built by: Luecke & Roeder; Fred Hildebrand
- Architect: Charles Hilpertshauser
- Architectural style: Italianate
- NRHP reference No.: 98000849
- Added to NRHP: July 9, 1998

The Henry and Charles Imig Block is a historic two-story building in Sheboygan, Wisconsin. It was built in 1881–1882 by masons Luecke & Roeder and carpenter Fred Hildebrand, and it was designed in the Italianate style by architect Charles Hilpertshauser. The building was initially a clothing and boot store run by the Imig brothers, whose father was an immigrant from Germany. The building has been listed on the National Register of Historic Places since July 9, 1998.
