= Vera Eugenia Andrus =

American artist

Vera Eugenia Andrus (1896–1979) was an American artist, and printmaker.

== Life ==
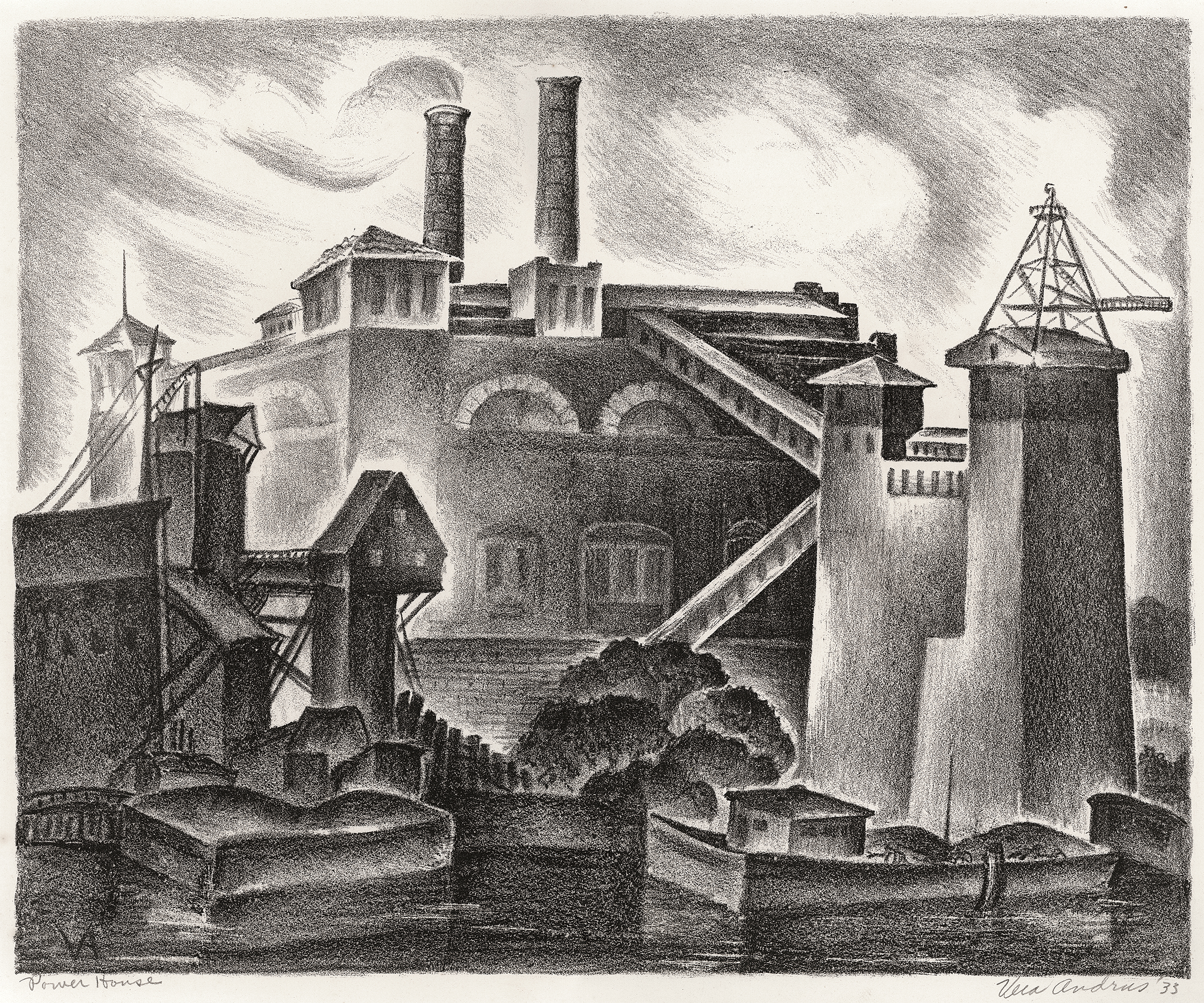
Hasting on Hudson, 1933, lithograph by Vera Andrus

Vera Andrus was born in Plymouth, Wisconsin. She was educated at the University of Minnesota, St. Paul School of Art, Minneapolis Institute of Art, and won a scholarship to the Art Students League of New York. She studied there with Boardman Robinson, George Groz and Eugene Fitsch. She became a lifelong friend of another Minnesota artist, Wanda Gag (1893-1946), whose lithographs sometimes reflected the same subjects.

She printed her lithographs in small editions, from sometimes less than 20 to 50, making them more difficult to find as time goes on. While she also produced watercolors, oil paintings, and book illustrations, lithography was her life-long devotion.

"The first time I drew on a lithographic stone, " she once stated, "I felt as though I had turned a corner and found something that I had been looking for all of my life." By 1970 she had created some 76 lithographs, relying throughout her career on the talents of master printer George C. Miller and his son Burr.

From 1931 to 1957, she was a staff member at the Metropolitan Museum of Art, commuting from Dobbs Ferry in the Hudson River Valley, where a prominent and wealthy branch of the Andrus family had settled. In the 1930s she traveled to Canada's Gaspe Peninsula and Nova Scotia, and in the 1950s went to France on a scholarship. Both voyages proved inspiration for some of the stunning images. Finally she went to live and work for many years in Rockport, Massachusetts, where she had a gallery and sold her work, and where she died at 83.

She was a member of numerous art associations including the American Artists Group, Rockport Art Association and the Hudson Valley Art Association. In 1950 she was elected a Fellow of the Royal Society of Art, London.

She was awarded several prizes, and her work is in the permanent collections of the Metropolitan Museum of Art, Library of Congress, Museum of Fine Arts, Boston, Crystal Bridges Museum of American Art, and numerous others. Records indicate that she also exhibited at the Whitney Museum, Carnegie Institute, Pennsylvania Academy of Fine Arts, and the Art Institute of Chicago, among others, and had one-woman shows at the Smithsonian Institution, the Rockport Art Association, and elsewhere.

Her papers are held at the Archives of American Art.

She died in Rockport, Massachusetts in 1979.

== Works ==
In addition to her artistic works, Vera Andrus wrote and illustrated three books:

- Sea Bird Island. (Harcourt Brace, 1939)
- Sea dust: poems, drawings, and lithographs. (Wake-Brook House, 1955)
- Black River: a Wisconsin story. (Little, Brown, 1967)
