= 2025 Ligier Junior Formula Championship =

American car race series

The 2025 Ligier Junior Formula Championship was the second season of the Ligier Junior Formula Championship. The series was rebranded from Ligier JS F4 Series for the 2025 season. The series served as a feeder into the United States Formula 4 Championship and was sanctioned by Parella Motorsports Holdings.

During the season, drivers are provided with a Ligier JS F416 chassis powered by Honda engines and utilize Hankook tires.

== Teams and drivers ==
| Team | No. | Driver | Status | Rounds |
|---|---|---|---|---|
| (United States) JENSEN | 1 | (South Africa) Zach Fourie | R | 1 |
| (United States) JENSEN | 2 | (United States) Josh Griffith | R | 1 |
| (United States) LC Racing Academy | 7 | (Canada) Beckham Jacir | R | 2–5 |
| (United States) LC Racing Academy | 8 | (United States) Jordyn Martin | R | 4 |
| (United States) LC Racing Academy | 24 | (Canada) Luca Day | R | 1 |
| (United States) Momentum Motorsports | 9 | (Canada) Luca Day | R | 2–5 |
| (United States) Momentum Motorsports | 46 | (Lebanon) Max Mokarem | R | 1–5 |
| (Brazil) Cará Origin Motorsports | 10 | (Brazil) Daniel Cará | | 1–4 |
| (United States) Champagne Racing | 11 | (United States) Cash Felber | R | All |
| (United States) Champagne Racing | 12 | (United States) Michael Fatutta | R | All |
| (United States) Champagne Racing | 42 | (Uruguay) Gastón Irazú | R | All |
| (United States) Champagne Racing | 67 | (Canada) Beckham Jacir | R | 6 |
| (United States) Champagne Racing | 73 | (United States) Roman Felber | R | All |
| (United States) Kiwi Motorsport | 15 | (South Africa) Zach Fourie | R | 3–5 |
| (United States) Crosslink Motorsports | 20 | (United States) Kelsey Pinkowski | R | 1–3 |
| (United States) Crosslink Motorsports | 34 | (United States) Josh Griffith | R | 3–4 |
| (United States) Crosslink Motorsports | 34 | (United States) William Rohan | | 5–6 |
| (United States) Berg Racing | 23 | (United States) Harbir Dass | | All |
| (United States) Berg Racing | 28 | (United States) Drew Szuch | | All |
| (United States) Berg Racing | 98 | (Canada) Alex Berg | | 5 |
| (United States) Berg Racing | 98 | (Japan) Taisei Murakami | R | 6 |
| (United States) Berg Racing | 08 | (United States) Ronan Bray | | 5–6 |
| (United States) Ava Hanssen Racing | 26 | (United States) Ava Hanssen | R | All |
| (United States) Scuderia Buell | 27 | (Argentina) Augusto Paschetta | R | 1–2 |
| (United States) Scuderia Buell | 44 | (Argentina) Pablo Benites Jr. | | 3, 6 |

| Icon | Status |
|---|---|
| R | Rookie |

== Race calendar ==
The 2025 calendar was announced on 27 September 2024. All rounds will support the Formula Regional Americas Championship and United States Formula 4.

| Round | | Circuit | Date |
|---|---|---|---|
| 1 | R1 | NOLA Motorsports Park, Avondale | 29 March |
| 1 | R2 | NOLA Motorsports Park, Avondale | 29 March |
| 1 | R3 | NOLA Motorsports Park, Avondale | 30 March |
| 2 | R1 | Road America, Elkhart Lake | 15–18 May |
| 2 | R2 | Road America, Elkhart Lake | 15–18 May |
| 2 | R3 | Road America, Elkhart Lake | 15–18 May |
| 3 | R1 | Mid-Ohio Sports Car Course, Lexington | 19–22 June |
| 3 | R2 | Mid-Ohio Sports Car Course, Lexington | 19–22 June |
| 3 | R3 | Mid-Ohio Sports Car Course, Lexington | 19–22 June |
| 4 | R1 | New Jersey Motorsports Park, Millville | 31 July-3 August |
| 4 | R2 | New Jersey Motorsports Park, Millville | 31 July-3 August |
| 4 | R3 | New Jersey Motorsports Park, Millville | 31 July-3 August |
| 5 | R1 | Virginia International Raceway, Alton | 18–21 September |
| 5 | R2 | Virginia International Raceway, Alton | 18–21 September |
| 6 | R1 | Barber Motorsports Park, Birmingham | 17–19 October |
| 6 | R2 | Barber Motorsports Park, Birmingham | 17–19 October |
| 6 | R3 | Barber Motorsports Park, Birmingham | 17–19 October |

== Race results ==
| Round | | Circuit | Pole position | Fastest lap | Winning driver | Winning team |
|---|---|---|---|---|---|---|
| 1 | R1 | NOLA Motorsports Park | (Brazil) Daniel Cará | (Uruguay) Gastón Irazú | (Uruguay) Gastón Irazú | (United States) Champagne Racing |
| 1 | R2 | NOLA Motorsports Park | | (Uruguay) Gastón Irazú | (United States) Drew Szuch | (United States) Berg Racing |
| 1 | R3 | NOLA Motorsports Park | | (Uruguay) Gastón Irazú | (Uruguay) Gastón Irazú | (United States) Champagne Racing |
| 2 | R1 | Road America | (Uruguay) Gastón Irazú (Note: Qualifying was cancelled due to inclement weather. The grid was set according to championship position.) | (United States) Drew Szuch | (United States) Drew Szuch | (United States) Berg Racing |
| 2 | R2 | Road America | | (Brazil) Daniel Cará | (Brazil) Daniel Cará | (Brazil) Cará Origin Motorsports |
| 2 | R3 | Road America | | (Uruguay) Gastón Irazú | (United States) Drew Szuch | (United States) Berg Racing |
| 3 | R1 | Mid-Ohio Sports Car Course | (Uruguay) Gastón Irazú (Note: Beckham Jacir set the fastest time in qualifying but was disqualified for a technical violation. Gastón Irazú inherited pole position.) | (Uruguay) Gastón Irazú | (United States) Cash Felber | (United States) Champagne Racing |
| 3 | R2 | Mid-Ohio Sports Car Course | | (Uruguay) Gastón Irazú | (Uruguay) Gastón Irazú | (United States) Champagne Racing |
| 3 | R3 | Mid-Ohio Sports Car Course | | (United States) Beckham Jacir | (Argentina) Pablo Benites Jr. | (United States) Scuderia Buell |
| 4 | R1 | New Jersey Motorsports Park | (United States) Roman Felber | (Uruguay) Gastón Irazú | (Uruguay) Gastón Irazú | (United States) Champagne Racing |
| 4 | R2 | New Jersey Motorsports Park | | (Uruguay) Gastón Irazú | (Uruguay) Gastón Irazú | (United States) Champagne Racing |
| 4 | R3 | New Jersey Motorsports Park | | Race cancelled after delays to weekend schedule | | |
| 5 | R1 | Virginia International Raceway | (United States) Drew Szuch | (Canada) Alex Berg | (United States) Drew Szuch | (United States) Berg Racing |
| 5 | R2 | Virginia International Raceway | | (United States) Beckham Jacir | (United States) Roman Felber | (United States) Champagne Racing |
| 6 | R1 | Barber Motorsports Park | (United States) Drew Szuch | (United States) Roman Felber | (United States) Cash Felber | (United States) Champagne Racing |
| 6 | R2 | Barber Motorsports Park | | (Canada) Beckham Jacir | (Canada) Beckham Jacir | (United States) Champagne Racing |

== Season report ==
=== Round 1: NOLA ===
The first round of the championship took place in the same venue as last year: NOLA Motorsports Park. Daniel Cará took pole for the opening race of the season after Gastón Irazú received a penalty for incorrect tire usage. He was passed at the start of the race after a false start by Harbir Dass and Drew Szuch, who fought for the lead. However, Szuch's engine cover came off in lap 6, and he was forced to retire. Irazú overtook Dass for the lead on lap 8.

For race two, Irazú started on pole. Szuch overtook him with eleven minutes remaining in the race, and a safety car period to recover the car of Roman Felber meant that Irazú could not retake the lead, giving Szuch his first win in the series.

Irazú was also on pole for race three, and led for the majority of the race — Max Mokarem overtook him at the start but lost the lead in the same lap. Irazú led the standings after the first round, with his team Champagne Racing leading the teams' standings.

=== Round 2: Road America ===
Round two took place six weeks later at Road America. Qualifying was cancelled due to lightning in the area, and the grid for race one was set by championship standings, so Irazú started from pole. Cará fought him for the lead on the opening lap, but the pair collided, dropping Irazú to seventh. He fought back through the field, finishing third behind Cará, in a photo finish with Szuch and Beckham Jacir. However, Cará was penalised for the earlier contact, giving Szuch the win.

Szuch started from pole for race two, alongside newcomer Jacir, who stalled at the start. Irazú took the lead on lap three, but he locked up the following lap, handing the lead to Cará. With two minutes remaining, Szuch was spun into the pit wall by Mokarem, and the race ended under safety car. Cará took his first single-seater win with half points awarded.

Cará started on pole for race three. Irazú, who started for sixth, made progress and took advantage of other drivers' errors to take the lead on lap three. He was overtaken again three laps later by Cará, who in turn spun not long after. Irazú and Szuch fought for the lead, and Irazú came out on top, but was penalised post-race for forcing Szuch off the track, giving Szuch his second win of the weekend. Irazú continued to lead the drivers' standings, 26 points ahead of Szuch.

=== Round 3: Mid-Ohio ===
Round three was held at Mid-Ohio Sports Car Course a month later. Jacir set the fastest time in qualifying, but the top three cars of Jacir, Pablo Benites and Szuch were disqualified after the session for a technical violation, with Irazú inheriting pole position. He was overtaken at the start by Cash Felber, with the pair running close together until Irazú spun on lap 15, sending him out of the podium positions for the first time this season. Szuch had charged through the field during the race, and overtook Felber for the lead on the penultimate lap, but was given a five-second penalty after the race for causing a collision with Luca Day. Felber took his maiden win, ahead of Jacir and Szuch.

Irazú again started on pole for race two and held it following an early battle with Cará. However, he made an error during the safety car restart on lap 6, with Cará and Benites both overtaking him, although he was able to return to the lead a lap later by overtaking them both around the outside of turn 4. He remained in front for the rest of the race, with Benites and Cará rounding out the podum.

Race three was shortened from thirty minutes to twenty. Another fastest lap meant a third pole position for Irazú. Jacir overtook him at the start, with Irazú slipping down to third. He spun on lap eight, again dropping out of the podium positions. The race ended under caution after Josh Griffith crashed, with Jacir initially taking the win. However, he was given a ten-second penalty for jumping the start, and Benites inherited the win ahead of Cash Felber and Szuch.

== Championship standings ==
Points were awarded as follows:

| Position | **1st** | **2nd** | **3rd** | **4th** | **5th** | **6th** | **7th** | **8th** | **9th** | **10th** |
| Points | 25 | 18 | 15 | 12 | 10 | 8 | 6 | 4 | 2 | 1 |

=== Drivers' standings ===
| Pos | Driver | NOL | | | ROA | | | MOH | | | NJM | | | VIR | | ALA | | Pts |
| Pos | Driver | R1 | R2 | R3 | R1 | R2 (Note: Half points were awarded as less than 50% of laps were completed under green flag conditions.) | R3 | R1 | R2 | R3 | R1 | R2 | R3 | R1 | R2 | R1 | R2 | Pts |
|---|---|---|---|---|---|---|---|---|---|---|---|---|---|---|---|---|---|---|
| 1 | (Uruguay) Gastón Irazú | 1 | 2 | 1 | **2** | 2 | 2 | **11** | 1 | 9 | 1 | 1 | C | 7 | Ret | 8 | 3 | 215 |
| 2 | (United States) Drew Szuch | Ret | 1 | 4 | 1 | 11† | 1 | 3 | 7 | 3 | 3 | 5 | C | **1** | Ret | **10** | 6 | 182 |
| 3 | (United States) Cash Felber | 5 | 7 | 8 | 5 | 10 | 5 | 1 | 5 | 2 | Ret | 2 | C | 3 | Ret | 1 | 2 | 169.5 |
| 4 | (United States) Harbir Dass | 2 | 3 | 5 | 3 | 3 | 7 | 7 | 9 | 4 | 9 | 4 | C | 5 | 3 | 5 | 5 | 150.5 |
| 5 | (Brazil) Daniel Cará | **3** | 4 | 2 | 6 | 1 | 4 | 5 | 3 | 6 | 5 | 7 | C | | | | | 126.5 |
| 6 | (Canada) Beckham Jacir | | | | 4 | Ret | 3 | 2 | 4 | 14 | Ret | 6 | C | 6 | 7 | 4 | 1 | 116 |
| 7 | (United States) Roman Felber | 9 | Ret | 7 | 11 | 6 | 8 | Ret | 6 | 13 | **2** | 3 | C | 2 | 1 | 3 | Ret | 115 |
| 8 | (Lebanon) Max Mokarem | Ret | 6 | 3 | 8 | 9 | 6 | 9 | 10 | 8 | 4 | 9 | C | 4 | 2 | | | 87 |
| 9 | (Argentina) Pablo Benites Jr. | | | | | | | 4 | 2 | 1 | | | | | | 2 | 8 | 77 |
| 10 | (United States) Ava Hanssen | 6 | 8 | 9 | 7 | 5 | 9 | 8 | 11 | 5 | 6 | 8 | C | 8 | 4 | 7 | NC | 75 |
| 11 | (Argentina) Augusto Paschetta | 4 | 5 | 6 | Ret | 4 | Ret | | | | | | | | | | | 36 |
| 12 | (South Africa) Zach Fourie | 7 | 11 | 10 | | | | 6 | 8 | 7 | 7 | 13† | C | 11 | Ret | | | 31 |
| 13 | (United States) William Rohan | | | | | | | | | | | | | 13 | 6 | 6 | 4 | 28 |
| 14 | (Canada) Luca Day | 11 | 9 | 11 | Ret | Ret | Ret | 13 | Ret | 11 | 10 | 11 | C | 9 | 5 | | | 15 |
| 15 | (United States) Michael Fatutta | 10 | 12 | 13 | 10 | 7 | 10 | 10 | 14 | 10 | 8 | Ret | C | 10 | Ret | WD | WD | 13 |
| 16 | (United States) Ronan Bray | | | | | | | | | | | | | Ret | 8 | 11 | 7 | 10 |
| 17 | (United States) Kelsey Pinkowski | 12 | 10 | 12 | 9 | 8 | 11 | 12 | 13 | 12 | | | | | | | | 5 |
| 18 | (United States) Josh Griffith | 8 | DNS | 14 | | | | 14 | 12 | Ret | 11 | 12† | C | | | | | 4 |
| 19 | (Japan) Taisei Murakami | | | | | | | | | | | | | | | 9 | NC | 2 |
| 20 | (United States) Jordyn Martin | | | | | | | | | | Ret | 10 | C | | | | | 1 |
| 21 | (Canada) Alex Berg | | | | | | | | | | | | | 12 | Ret | | | 0 |
| Pos | Driver | R1 | R2 | R3 | R1 | R2 | R3 | R1 | R2 | R3 | R1 | R2 | R3 | R1 | R2 | R1 | R2 | Pts |
| Pos | Driver | NOL | | | ROA | | | MOH | | | NJM | | | VIR | | ALA | | Pts |

| Colour | Result |
|---|---|
| Gold | Winner |
| Silver | Second place |
| Bronze | Third place |
| Green | Points classification |
| Blue | Non-points classification |
| Blue | Non-classified finish (NC) |
| Purple | Retired, not classified (Ret) |
| Red | Did not qualify (DNQ) |
| Red | Did not pre-qualify (DNPQ) |
| Black | Disqualified (DSQ) |
| White | Did not start (DNS) |
| White | Withdrew (WD) |
| White | Race cancelled (C) |
| Blank | Did not practice (DNP) |
| Blank | Did not arrive (DNA) |
| Blank | Excluded (EX) |

**Bold** – Pole
Italics – Fastest Lap
Rookie

=== Teams' standings ===
| Pos | Team | NOL | | | ROA | | | MOH | | | NJM | | | VIR | | ALA | | Pts |
| Pos | Team | R1 | R2 | R3 | R1 | R2 | R3 | R1 | R2 | R3 | R1 | R2 | R3 | R1 | R2 | R1 | R2 | Pts |
|---|---|---|---|---|---|---|---|---|---|---|---|---|---|---|---|---|---|---|
| 1 | (United States) Champagne Racing | 1 | 2 | 1 | 2 | 2 | 2 | 1 | 1 | 2 | 1 | 1 | C | 2 | 1 | 1 | 1 | 467 |
| 1 | (United States) Champagne Racing | 5 | 7 | 7 | 5 | 6 | 5 | 10 | 5 | 9 | 2 | 2 | C | 3 | Ret | 3 | 2 | 467 |
| 2 | (United States) Berg Racing | 2 | 1 | 4 | 1 | 3 | 1 | 3 | 7 | 3 | 3 | 4 | C | 1 | 3 | 5 | 5 | 337.5 |
| 2 | (United States) Berg Racing | Ret | 3 | 5 | 3 | 11† | 7 | 7 | 9 | 4 | 9 | 5 | C | 5 | 8 | 9 | 6 | 337.5 |
| 3 | (Brazil) Cará Origin Motorsports | 3 | 4 | 2 | 6 | 1 | 4 | 5 | 3 | 6 | 5 | 7 | C | | | | | 126.5 |
| 4 | (United States) Scuderia Buell | 4 | 5 | 6 | Ret | 4 | Ret | 4 | 2 | 1 | | | | | | 2 | 8 | 113 |
| 5 | (United States) Momentum Motorsports | Ret | 6 | 3 | 8 | 9 | 6 | 9 | 10 | 8 | 4 | 9 | C | 4 | 2 | | | 100 |
| 5 | (United States) Momentum Motorsports | | | | Ret | Ret | Ret | 13 | Ret | 11 | 10 | 11 | C | 9 | 5 | | | 100 |
| 6 | (United States) LC Racing Academy | 11 | 9 | 11 | 4 | Ret | 3 | 2 | 4 | 14 | Ret | 6 | C | 6 | 7 | | | 82 |
| 6 | (United States) LC Racing Academy | | | | | | | | | | Ret | 10 | C | | | | | 82 |
| 7 | (United States) Ava Hanssen Racing | 6 | 8 | 9 | 7 | 5 | 9 | 8 | 11 | 5 | 6 | 8 | C | 8 | 4 | 7 | Ret | 75 |
| 8 | (United States) Crosslink Motorsport | 12 | 10 | 12 | 9 | 8 | 11 | 12 | 12 | 12 | 11 | 12† | C | 13 | 6 | 6 | 4 | 33 |
| 8 | (United States) Crosslink Motorsport | | | | | | | 14 | 13 | Ret | | | | | | | | 33 |
| 9 | (United States) Kiwi Motorsport | | | | | | | 6 | 8 | 7 | 7 | 13† | C | 11 | Ret | | | 24 |
| 10 | (United States) JENSEN | 7 | 11 | 10 | | | | | | | | | | | | | | 11 |
| 10 | (United States) JENSEN | 8 | DNS | 14 | | | | | | | | | | | | | | 11 |
| Pos | Team | NOL | | | ROA | | | MOH | | | NJM | | | VIR | | ALA | | Pts |
| Pos | Team | R1 | R2 | R3 | R1 | R2 | R3 | R1 | R2 | R3 | R1 | R2 | R3 | R1 | R2 | R1 | R2 | Pts |
