= 2025 Formula Regional Americas Championship =

Motor racing competition

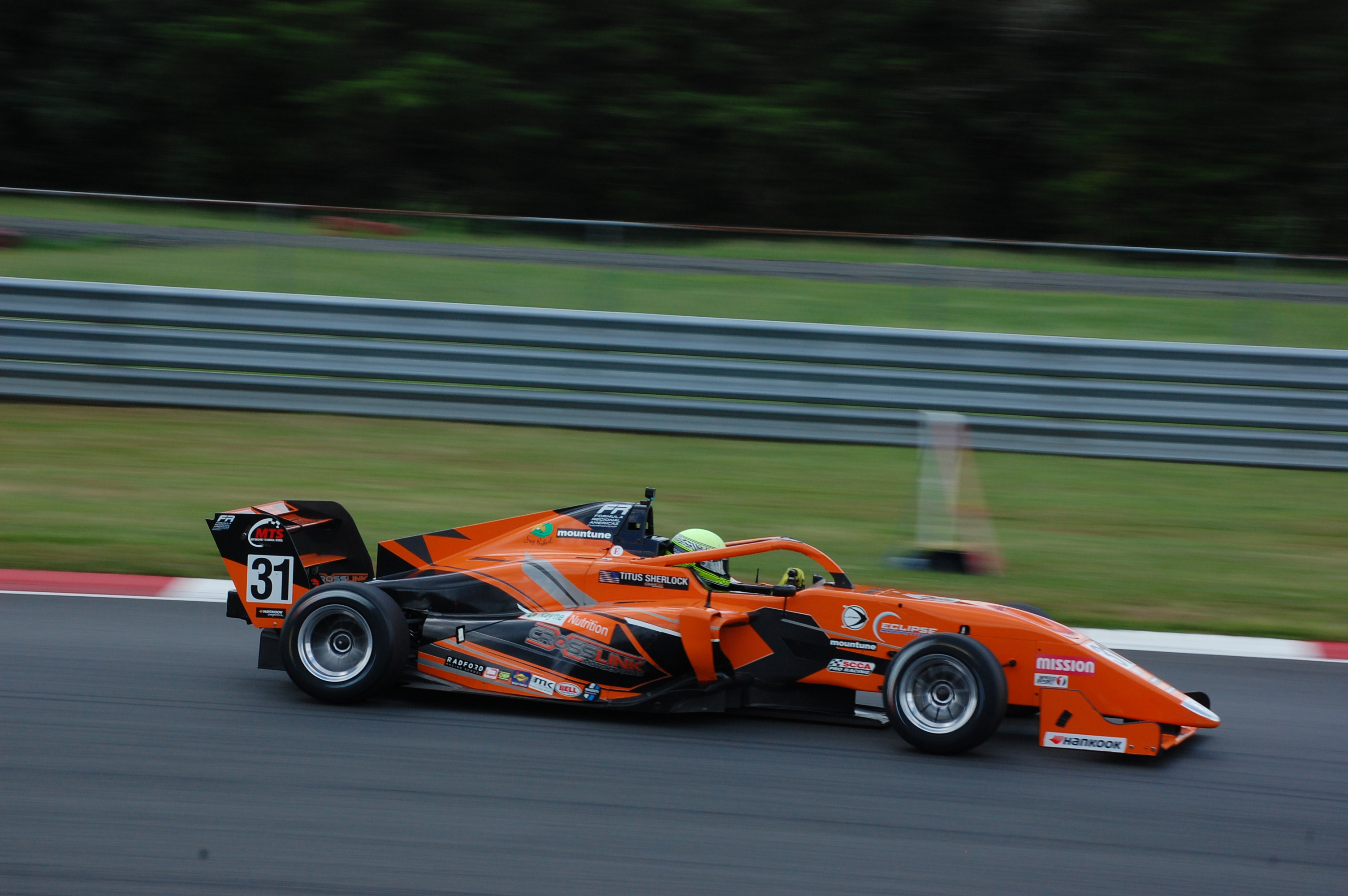
Titus Sherlock won the 2025 championship driving for Crosslink Motorsports.

The 2025 Formula Regional Americas Championship was the eighth season of a FIA-sanctioned F3/FR-level series across North America, and the sixth season under the Formula Regional moniker after a rebrand in 2020. The series was promoted by SCCA Pro Racing, the professional racing division of the Sports Car Club of America.

Crosslink Motorsports driver Titus Sherlock won the Drivers' Championship title at the penultimate race of the season, while the team of his closest competitors, Kiwi Motorsports, defended their Teams' Championship title for the third year in a row, after winning it in conjunction with Crosslink Motorsports in 2023 and 2024, with four races to spare. Kiwi Motorsports' Bruno Ribeiro, third overall, won the Rookie title, while Momentum Motorsports' Anthony Autiello was awarded the Masters' title.

== Teams and drivers ==
All drivers competed with Ligier JS F3 cars on Hankook tires powered by mountune MK20R engine power units based on the Honda K20C1 engine.

Team	No.	Driver	Status	Rounds
Jensen Global Advisors	1	(United States) Jake Pollack	R	1
Jensen Global Advisors	1	(United States) Athan Sterling	R	2
Jensen Global Advisors	2	(United States) Athan Sterling	R	1
Crosslink Motorsports	3	(United States) Hayden Bowlsbey		3–4
Crosslink Motorsports	5	(United States) Alex Benavitz	R	1–3
Crosslink Motorsports	5	(United States) Jake Pollack	R	4–6
Crosslink Motorsports	5	(United States) Landan Matriano Lim		7
Crosslink Motorsports	13	(United States) Barrett Wolfe	R	All
Crosslink Motorsports	31	(United States) Titus Sherlock		All
Kiwi Motorsports	6	(Canada) Nicole Havrda		1
Kiwi Motorsports	14	(United States) Cooper Shipman		8
Kiwi Motorsports	15	(Australia) Nicolas Stati	R	1–4
Kiwi Motorsports	22	(United States) Jett Bowling		All
Kiwi Motorsports	24	(Canada) Kevin Janzen	M	1–4, 6–8
Kiwi Motorsports	55	(Chile) Nicolás Ambiado		All
Kiwi Motorsports	01	(Brazil) Bruno Ribeiro	R	All
Atlantic Racing Team	42	(Australia) Daniel Quimby	R	1–2
Atlantic Racing Team	45	(Canada) Callum Baxter	R	6
Atlantic Racing Team	88	(Canada) James Lawley		All
Atlantic Racing Team with Team Roberts	46	(United States) Connor Roberts	R	All
Toney Driver Development	80	(United States) Brady Golan	R	All
Toney Driver Development	95	(United States) Lincoln Day	R	1–2, 4, 8
Toney Driver Development	95	(United States) Bijoy Garg		3
Toney Driver Development	95	(United States) Christian Brooks		7
Momentum Motorsports	07	(United States) Anthony Autiello	M	1–3, 5–8

Icon	Status
R	Rookie
M	Masters' class

== Race calendar ==
The 2025 calendar was announced on 27 September 2024. The championship returned to Virginia International Raceway and Barber Motorsports Park after one- and four-year absences respectively. The non-championship round at Laguna Seca was not held, as was the round at Circuit of the Americas. The rounds at Mid-Ohio, VIR and Barber Motorsports Park were scheduled to hold only two races, forming a 21-race calendar. The first race at Indianapolis was not held due to adverse weather conditions, with a third race at Mid-Ohio added to keep the 21-race tally.

Round		Circuit	Date	Support bill	Map of circuit locations
1	R1	(United States) NOLA Motorsports Park, Avondale	29 March	NOLA SpeedTour; SVRA Sprint Series; Ligier Junior Formula Championship; Formula 4 United States Championship	2025 Formula Regional Americas Championship is located in the United States
1	R2	(United States) NOLA Motorsports Park, Avondale	29 March	NOLA SpeedTour; SVRA Sprint Series; Ligier Junior Formula Championship; Formula 4 United States Championship	2025 Formula Regional Americas Championship is located in the United States
1	R3	(United States) NOLA Motorsports Park, Avondale	30 March	NOLA SpeedTour; SVRA Sprint Series; Ligier Junior Formula Championship; Formula 4 United States Championship	2025 Formula Regional Americas Championship is located in the United States
2	R1	(United States) Road America, Elkhart Lake	17 May	SVRA Sprint Series; Porsche GT3 Cup Trophy USA; Ligier Junior Formula Championship; Formula 4 United States Championship	2025 Formula Regional Americas Championship is located in the United States
2	R2	(United States) Road America, Elkhart Lake	17 May	SVRA Sprint Series; Porsche GT3 Cup Trophy USA; Ligier Junior Formula Championship; Formula 4 United States Championship	2025 Formula Regional Americas Championship is located in the United States
2	R3	(United States) Road America, Elkhart Lake	18 May	SVRA Sprint Series; Porsche GT3 Cup Trophy USA; Ligier Junior Formula Championship; Formula 4 United States Championship	2025 Formula Regional Americas Championship is located in the United States
3	R1	(United States) Indianapolis Motor Speedway, Speedway	14 June	SVRA Sprint Series; Ginetta Challenge Race Series; BMW CCA Club Racing; Sports 2000 North America	2025 Formula Regional Americas Championship is located in the United States
3	R2	(United States) Indianapolis Motor Speedway, Speedway	15 June	SVRA Sprint Series; Ginetta Challenge Race Series; BMW CCA Club Racing; Sports 2000 North America	2025 Formula Regional Americas Championship is located in the United States
3	R3	(United States) Indianapolis Motor Speedway, Speedway	15 June	SVRA Sprint Series; Ginetta Challenge Race Series; BMW CCA Club Racing; Sports 2000 North America	2025 Formula Regional Americas Championship is located in the United States
4	R1	(United States) Mid-Ohio Sports Car Course, Lexington	21 June	SVRA Sprint Series; Trans-Am Series; Formula 4 United States Championship; Ligier Junior Formula Championship	2025 Formula Regional Americas Championship is located in the United States
4	R2	(United States) Mid-Ohio Sports Car Course, Lexington	21 June	SVRA Sprint Series; Trans-Am Series; Formula 4 United States Championship; Ligier Junior Formula Championship	2025 Formula Regional Americas Championship is located in the United States
4	R3	(United States) Mid-Ohio Sports Car Course, Lexington	22 June	SVRA Sprint Series; Trans-Am Series; Formula 4 United States Championship; Ligier Junior Formula Championship	2025 Formula Regional Americas Championship is located in the United States
5	R1	(United States) New Jersey Motorsports Park, Millville	2 August	SVRA Sprint Series; Ligier Junior Formula Championship; Formula 4 United States Championship; Formula Race Promotions	2025 Formula Regional Americas Championship is located in the United States
5	R2	(United States) New Jersey Motorsports Park, Millville	3 August	SVRA Sprint Series; Ligier Junior Formula Championship; Formula 4 United States Championship; Formula Race Promotions	2025 Formula Regional Americas Championship is located in the United States
5	R3	(United States) New Jersey Motorsports Park, Millville	3 August	SVRA Sprint Series; Ligier Junior Formula Championship; Formula 4 United States Championship; Formula Race Promotions	2025 Formula Regional Americas Championship is located in the United States
6	R1	(Canada) Canadian Tire Motorsports Park, Bowmanville	29 August	NASCAR Canada Series; Radical Cup Canada; Trans-Am Series; Formula 4 United States Championship	2025 Formula Regional Americas Championship is located in the United States
6	R2	(Canada) Canadian Tire Motorsports Park, Bowmanville	30 August	NASCAR Canada Series; Radical Cup Canada; Trans-Am Series; Formula 4 United States Championship	2025 Formula Regional Americas Championship is located in the United States
6	R3	(Canada) Canadian Tire Motorsports Park, Bowmanville	31 August	NASCAR Canada Series; Radical Cup Canada; Trans-Am Series; Formula 4 United States Championship	2025 Formula Regional Americas Championship is located in the United States
7	R1	(United States) Virginia International Raceway, Alton	20 September	Ligier Junior Formula Championship; Formula 4 United States Championship; Trans-Am Series	2025 Formula Regional Americas Championship is located in the United States
7	R2	(United States) Virginia International Raceway, Alton	21 September	Ligier Junior Formula Championship; Formula 4 United States Championship; Trans-Am Series	2025 Formula Regional Americas Championship is located in the United States
8	R1	(United States) Barber Motorsports Park, Birmingham	18 October	Ligier Junior Formula Championship; Formula 4 United States Championship; Trans-Am Series	2025 Formula Regional Americas Championship is located in the United States
8	R2	(United States) Barber Motorsports Park, Birmingham	19 October	Ligier Junior Formula Championship; Formula 4 United States Championship; Trans-Am Series	2025 Formula Regional Americas Championship is located in the United States

== Race results ==
Round		Circuit	Pole position	Fastest lap	Winning driver	Winning team	Rookie winner	Masters' winner
1	R1	(United States) NOLA Motorsports Park	(Chile) Nicolás Ambiado	(Chile) Nicolás Ambiado	(United States) Titus Sherlock	Crosslink Motorsports	(United States) Barrett Wolfe	(Canada) Kevin Janzen
1	R2	(United States) NOLA Motorsports Park		(United States) Jett Bowling	(United States) Brady Golan	Toney Driver Development	(United States) Brady Golan	(United States) Anthony Autiello
1	R3	(United States) NOLA Motorsports Park		(Brazil) Bruno Ribeiro	(Chile) Nicolás Ambiado	Kiwi Motorsports	(Brazil) Bruno Ribeiro	(Canada) Kevin Janzen
2	R1	(United States) Road America	(United States) Titus Sherlock	(United States) Titus Sherlock	(United States) Titus Sherlock	Crosslink Motorsports	(Brazil) Bruno Ribeiro	(Canada) Kevin Janzen
2	R2	(United States) Road America		(United States) Jett Bowling	(United States) Titus Sherlock	Crosslink Motorsports	(Brazil) Bruno Ribeiro	(Canada) Kevin Janzen
2	R3	(United States) Road America		(United States) Jett Bowling	(United States) Titus Sherlock	Crosslink Motorsports	(United States) Brady Golan	(United States) Anthony Autiello
3	R1	(United States) Indianapolis Motor Speedway	(United States) Brady Golan	race postponed to Mid-Ohio for adverse weather conditions				
3	R2	(United States) Indianapolis Motor Speedway		(Chile) Nicolás Ambiado	(United States) Jett Bowling	Kiwi Motorsports	(Brazil) Bruno Ribeiro	(United States) Anthony Autiello
3	R3	(United States) Indianapolis Motor Speedway		(Chile) Nicolás Ambiado	(Chile) Nicolás Ambiado	Kiwi Motorsports	(Brazil) Bruno Ribeiro	(Canada) Kevin Janzen
4	R1	(United States) Mid-Ohio Sports Car Course	(Brazil) Bruno Ribeiro	(Brazil) Bruno Ribeiro	(Brazil) Bruno Ribeiro	Kiwi Motorsports	(Brazil) Bruno Ribeiro	(Canada) Kevin Janzen
4	R2	(United States) Mid-Ohio Sports Car Course		(Brazil) Bruno Ribeiro	(Chile) Nicolás Ambiado	Kiwi Motorsports	(Brazil) Bruno Ribeiro	(Canada) Kevin Janzen
4	R3	(United States) Mid-Ohio Sports Car Course		(Brazil) Bruno Ribeiro	(Brazil) Bruno Ribeiro	Kiwi Motorsports	(Brazil) Bruno Ribeiro	(Canada) Kevin Janzen
5	R1	(United States) New Jersey Motorsports Park	(United States) Jett Bowling	(Chile) Nicolás Ambiado	(Brazil) Bruno Ribeiro	Kiwi Motorsports	(Brazil) Bruno Ribeiro	(United States) Anthony Autiello
5	R2	(United States) New Jersey Motorsports Park		(Brazil) Bruno Ribeiro	(Chile) Nicolás Ambiado	Kiwi Motorsports	(Brazil) Bruno Ribeiro	no classified finishers
5	R3	(United States) New Jersey Motorsports Park		race cancelled after delays to weekend schedule				
6	R1	(Canada) Canadian Tire Motorsports Park	(United States) Jett Bowling	(Chile) Nicolás Ambiado	(United States) Titus Sherlock	Crosslink Motorsports	(United States) Connor Roberts	(Canada) Kevin Janzen
6	R2	(Canada) Canadian Tire Motorsports Park		(United States) Titus Sherlock	(United States) Titus Sherlock	Crosslink Motorsports	(United States) Connor Roberts	(Canada) Kevin Janzen
6	R3	(Canada) Canadian Tire Motorsports Park		(Brazil) Bruno Ribeiro	(United States) Titus Sherlock	Crosslink Motorsports	(Brazil) Bruno Ribeiro	(Canada) Kevin Janzen
7	R1	(United States) Virginia International Raceway	(United States) Christian Brooks	(United States) Christian Brooks	(United States) Christian Brooks	Toney Driver Development	(United States) Brady Golan	(United States) Anthony Autiello
7	R2	(United States) Virginia International Raceway		(United States) Christian Brooks	(United States) Christian Brooks	Toney Driver Development	(United States) Connor Roberts	(Canada) Kevin Janzen
8	R1	(United States) Barber Motorsports Park	(Brazil) Bruno Ribeiro (Note: Titus Sherlock was fastest in qualifying, but started sixth due to a five-place grid penalty. Bruno Ribeiro started the race from pole position.)	(United States) Jett Bowling	(United States) Brady Golan	Toney Driver Development	(United States) Brady Golan	(United States) Anthony Autiello
8	R2	(United States) Barber Motorsports Park		(Brazil) Bruno Ribeiro	(United States) Titus Sherlock	Crosslink Motorsports	(United States) Brady Golan	(United States) Anthony Autiello

== Season report ==
=== First half ===
The 2025 Formula Regional Americas Championship began at NOLA Motorsports Park. Kiwi Motorsport locked out the front row in qualifying, with Nicolás Ambiado on pole position ahead of Bruno Ribeiro. Wet conditions defined race one, where a mix of tyre choices and a cautious start led to early chaos. Toney Driver Development's Brady Golan had started on slicks to take the lead initially, but Crosslink's Titus Sherlock charged through on wet tires to take control. Two safety-car periods saw half points awarded for limited green running, and Sherlock secured victory ahead of Ambiado and Crosslink's Barrett Wolfe. Race two also began in damp conditions. Ambiado led until Sherlock again surged to the front before suffering an engine failure. Golan inherited the lead and held off Ambiado to take his first win. In the dry race three, Kiwi Motorsport's Jett Bowling converted pole position into an early advantage, but Ambiado passed Ribeiro and capitalized on a late mistake from Bowling to claim victory and the points lead ahead of Golan and Ribeiro.

Road America hosted round two, where Bowling was fastest in qualifying but caused a red flag, so he lost his best lap and Sherlock inherited pole position. Race one began on slicks before heavy rain forced a mid-race switch to wets and a long caution period. Sherlock led throughout the disrupted race, finishing ahead of Ribeiro and Atlantic/Team Roberts' Connor Roberts as only five laps were completed and half points were awarded. In race two, Ribeiro overtook Sherlock at the start, but Sherlock reclaimed the lead on lap two and stayed ahead until a caution-neutralized finish after incidents involving Toney Driver Development's Lincoln Day and Kiwi Motorsports' Kevin Janzen. Bowling started race three from pole position, before he went off at the restart after an early caution, which promoted Sherlock to the front. Further interruptions followed, and when Ribeiro and Ambiado collided battling for third, Golan inherited the final podium spot. Sherlock’s clean sweep put him atop the standings with 87 points, with Ambiado now second.

Golan took pole position at Indianapolis Motor Speedway with a margin of 0.183 seconds over Bowling, while Ambiado qualified third and points leader Sherlock fourth. Persistent rain forced the cancellation of practice and postponed the opening race to Sunday, with the third race rescheduled to Mid-Ohio. In the first race, Bowling seized the lead around the outside of turn one, while Golan ran wide and Sherlock retired early with a mechanical issue. Ambiado inherited second before a caution for an off-track moment for Wolfe bunched up the field. Bowling held firm after the restart to secure his maiden victory, as Ribeiro and Kiwi Motorsport's Nicolas Stati passed Ambiado late when he locked up on lap 17. Ambiado nevertheless earned race two pole position with the fastest lap. He lost out to Bowling at the start but reclaimed the lead with a move around the outside of turn one on lap five and pulled clear to win. Sherlock recovered to fourth, but still had to relinquish the championship lead to Ambiado, who left Indianapolis 6 points ahead of the field.

The first half of the season closed off at Mid-Ohio Sports Car Course, where Ribeiro claimed pole position ahead of Ambiado and Golan. Race one was controlled from start to finish by Ribeiro, who built a lead of 1.6 seconds before Ambiado closed back in on the final lap to finish 0.2s behind as Sherlock passed Golan for third. Ribeiro’s fastest lap earned him race two pole position, but Ambiado led early before a caution came out for Hayden Bowlsbey’s stranded Crosslink Motorsport car. After the restart, the top two fought for the lead, making contact on lap 15, with Ambiado narrowly prevailing. Sherlock in third came under pressure from Bowling, who got past him on the penultimate lap. Ribeiro started race three from pole position, but lost the lead at the start before repassing Ambiado on lap 12. Ambiado later dropped to third behind Bowling after a mistake. Ribeiro's double win saw him claim a three-point championship lead over Ambiado, with Sherlock retired from race three and dropped to fourth in the standings.

=== Second half ===
Bowling led the way at New Jersey Motorsports Park, topping both practice and qualifying to secure pole position by 0.019 seconds over championship leader Ribeiro, with Sherlock and Ambiado completing the top four. Bowling converted pole position into an early lead in race one, while contact between Ambiado and Ribeiro allowed Ambiado and Sherlock to move ahead. A mechanical issue for Bowling then handed Ambiado the lead, but a drive-through penalty for the earlier contact dropped him from contention once a pair of late caution periods brought the race to an early finish. Ribeiro inherited victory ahead of the Crosslink pair of Jake Pollack and Sherlock. Ambiado’s fastest lap earned him pole position for race two, which began after a delay to recover a stalled car. Bowling challenged for the lead at the restart but ran wide at turn one, allowing Ribeiro through. The pair circulated closely for the remainder of the race, with Ambiado prevailing. The third race was cancelled, leaving Ribeiro atop the standings, now with an eleven-point lead.

Bowling doubled up in qualifying for round six at Canadian Tire Motorsport Park, topping the session and securing pole position ahead of Sherlock, while Golan and Ambiado completed the top four. Ribeiro had an incident in practice that saw him miss qualifying and the opening race. Sherlock overtook Bowling at the start and resisted pressure from Ambiado after a caution period to take victory, with Roberts finishing third. Ambiado’s fastest lap earned him pole position for race two, but Sherlock moved ahead by turn four once racing began. Ribeiro climbed from the back before retiring mid-race with a mechanical issue, and Sherlock led Bowling and Roberts home when the race finished under caution with half-points awarded. Starting from pole position again in race three, Sherlock quickly pulled clear, while Ribeiro took second, unable to challenge the leader, and Bowling came third. Sherlock’s sweep brought him within 11.5 points of the top, with Ribeiro retaining a narrow four-point championship lead despite two non-scores.

The penultimate round, held at Virginia International Raceway, was dominated by one-off entrant Christian Brooks, who made his series debut for Toney Driver Development. He topped practice before taking pole position in qualifying over Sherlock and Ribeiro. Brooks converted his advantage into the lead at the start of race one, while Ribeiro passed Sherlock for second before retiring with smoke from his car. Brooks secured victory ahead of Golan and Sherlock. He started from pole position again in race two, with Ribeiro alongside. Ribeiro jumped the start and later received a penalty, while Sherlock made a strong getaway to move into third. Brooks kept his lead as Sherlock took second before a caution ended the race, allowing Brooks to claim his second win. Two podiums saw Sherlock reclaim the championship lead by 13.5 points over Ambiado.

Sherlock narrowly beat Ribeiro to pole position for the season finale at Barber Motorsports Park, but a grid penalty dropped him to fifth. Ambiado and Bowling failed to start due to technical issues, and after Day stalled on the grid, the field was rerouted through the pits for a rolling restart. Sherlock climbed to third within a lap, passing Shipman at turn five before a suspension failure forced Ribeiro to pit from the lead. Golan retained first position to take victory ahead of Sherlock, whose result secured the title. Bowling started race two from pole position and led early on, but Golan overtook around the outside at turn one following an early caution. Sherlock later passed Bowling and chased Golan to the finish, overtaking at the final corner to win. Ambiado completed the podium, with Sherlock ending the season 41.5 points clear in the standings.

== Championship standings ==
Points were awarded as follows:

Position	**1st**	**2nd**	**3rd**	**4th**	**5th**	**6th**	**7th**	**8th**	**9th**	**10th**
Points	25	18	15	12	10	8	6	4	2	1

=== Drivers' standings ===
Pos	Driver	NOL (United States)			ROA (United States)			IMS (United States)			MOH (United States)			NJM (United States)			MOS (Canada)			VIR (United States)		ALA (United States)		Pts
Pos	Driver	R1 (Note: Half points were awarded in the first race at NOLA as less than 50% of laps were completed under green flag conditions.)	R2	R3	R1 (Note: Half points were awarded in the first race at Road America as less than 50% of laps were completed under green flag conditions.)	R2	R3	R1	R2	R3	R1	R2	R3	R1	R2	R3	R1	R2 (Note: Half points were awarded for the second race at CTMP as less than 50% of the race were completed under green flag conditions.)	R3	R1	R2	R1	R2	Pts
1	(United States) Titus Sherlock	1	Ret	4	**1**	1	1	C	Ret	4	3	4	Ret	3	4	C	1	1	1	3	2	2	1	291.5
2	(Chile) Nicolás Ambiado	**2**	2	1	9	3	11	C	4	1	2	1	3	5	1	C	2	4	10	4	11†	DNS	3	250
3	(Brazil) Bruno Ribeiro	17	3	3	2	2	6	C	2	3	**1**	2	1	1	2	C	DNS	Ret	2	Ret	10	**Ret**	9	230
4	(United States) Jett Bowling	6	11	2	8	7	2	C	1	2	4	3	2	**9**	3	C	**10†**	2	3	Ret	3	NC	4	205
5	(United States) Brady Golan	8	1	5	4	8	3	C	**9†**	6	6	8	4	7	5	C	4	5	6	2	Ret	1	2	198
6	(United States) Connor Roberts	15	DNS	11	3	5	7	C	10†	8	9	6	5	6	6	C	3	3	4	7	4	4	6	137
7	(Canada) James Lawley	10	7	8	6	9	Ret	C	7	10	8	7	6	4	7	C	5	6	5	5	5	5	5	123.5
8	(Australia) Nicolas Stati	11	8	6	5	6	4	C	3	5	5	5	Ret											82
9	(United States) Barrett Wolfe	3	6	10	11	11	8	C	Ret	Ret	11	10	9	Ret	9	C	6	7	8	6	7	6	Ret	62.5
10	(United States) Christian Brooks																			**1**	1			50
11	(United States) Jake Pollack	7	9	Ret							10	9	8	2	8	C	7	DNS	9					42
12	(Australia) Daniel Quimby	13	4	7	12	4	5																	40
13	(United States) Alex Benavitz	4	5	Ret	14	10	Ret	C	5	9														29
14	(United States) Anthony Autiello **M**	16	10	14	Ret	Ret	9	C	11†	13				8	Ret	C	Ret	10	12	8	9	7	8	23.5
15	(United States) Lincoln Day	5	12	9	7	13	10†				WD	WD	WD									8	7	21
16	(United States) Hayden Bowlsbey							C	6	11	7	Ret	7											20
17	(United States) Cooper Shipman																					3	10	16
18	(Canada) Callum Baxter																8	8	7					12
19	(Canada) Kevin Janzen **M**	14	14	13	10	12†	Ret	C	NC	12	12	11	10				9	9	11	9	8	Ret	11	10.5
20	(United States) Bijoy Garg							C	8	7														10
21	(United States) Landan Matriano Lim																			Ret	6			8
22	(United States) Athan Sterling	9	Ret	Ret	13	Ret	Ret																	1
23	(Canada) Nicole Havrda	12	13	12																				0
Pos	Driver	R1	R2	R3	R1	R2	R3	R1	R2	R3	R1	R2	R3	R1	R2	R3	R1	R2	R3	R1	R2	R1	R2	Pts
Pos	Driver	NOL (United States)			ROA (United States)			IMS (United States)			MOH (United States)			NJM (United States)			MOS (Canada)			VIR (United States)		ALA (United States)		Pts

Colour	Result
Gold	Winner
Silver	Second place
Bronze	Third place
Green	Points classification
Blue	Non-points classification
Blue	Non-classified finish (NC)
Purple	Retired, not classified (Ret)
Red	Did not qualify (DNQ)
Red	Did not pre-qualify (DNPQ)
Black	Disqualified (DSQ)
White	Did not start (DNS)
White	Withdrew (WD)
White	Race cancelled (C)
Blank	Did not practice (DNP)
Blank	Did not arrive (DNA)
Blank	Excluded (EX)

**Bold** – Pole

Italics – Fastest Lap

† — Did not finish, but classified

=== Teams' standings ===
Only a teams' two best-finishing cars were eligible for teams' championship points.

Pos	Team	NOL (United States)			ROA (United States)			IMS (United States)			MOH (United States)			NJM (United States)			MOS (Canada)			VIR (United States)		ALA (United States)		Pts
Pos	Team	R1	R2	R3	R1	R2	R3	R1	R2	R3	R1	R2	R3	R1	R2	R3	R1	R2	R3	R1	R2	R1	R2	Pts
1	Kiwi Motorsports	2	2	1	2	2	2	C	1	1	1	1	1	1	1	C	2	2	2	4	3	3	3	602
1	Kiwi Motorsports	6	3	2	5	3	4	C	2	2	2	2	2	5	2	C	9	4	3	9	8	NC	4	602
2	Crosslink Motorsports	1	6	4	1	1	1	C	5	4	3	4	7	2	4	C	1	1	1	3	2	2	1	422
2	Crosslink Motorsports	3	Ret	10	11	10	8	C	6	9	7	9	8	3	8	C	6	7	8	6	6	6	Ret	422
3	Atlantic Racing Team (Note: Includes points scored by the No. 46 Atlantic Racing Team with Team Roberts entry)	10	4	7	3	4	5	C	7	8	8	6	5	4	6	C	3	3	4	5	4	4	5	298.5
3	Atlantic Racing Team	13	7	8	6	5	7	C	10†	10	9	7	6	6	7	C	5	6	5	7	5	5	6	298.5
4	Toney Driver Development	5	1	5	4	8	3	C	8	6	6	8	4	7	5	C	4	5	6	1	1	1	2	279
4	Toney Driver Development	8	12	9	7	13	10†	C	9†	7	WD	WD	WD							2	Ret	8	7	279
5	Momentum Motorsports	16	10	14	Ret	Ret	9	C	11†	13				8	Ret	C	Ret	10	12	8	9	7	8	23.5
6	Jensen Global Advisors	7	9	Ret	13	Ret	Ret																	6
6	Jensen Global Advisors	9	Ret	Ret																				6
Pos	Team	R1	R2	R3	R1	R2	R3	R1	R2	R3	R1	R2	R3	R1	R2	R3	R1	R2	R3	R1	R2	R1	R2	Pts
Pos	Team	NOL (United States)			ROA (United States)			IMS (United States)			MOH (United States)			NJM (United States)			MOS (Canada)			VIR (United States)		ALA (United States)		Pts
