= Plymouth, Wisconsin =

- City
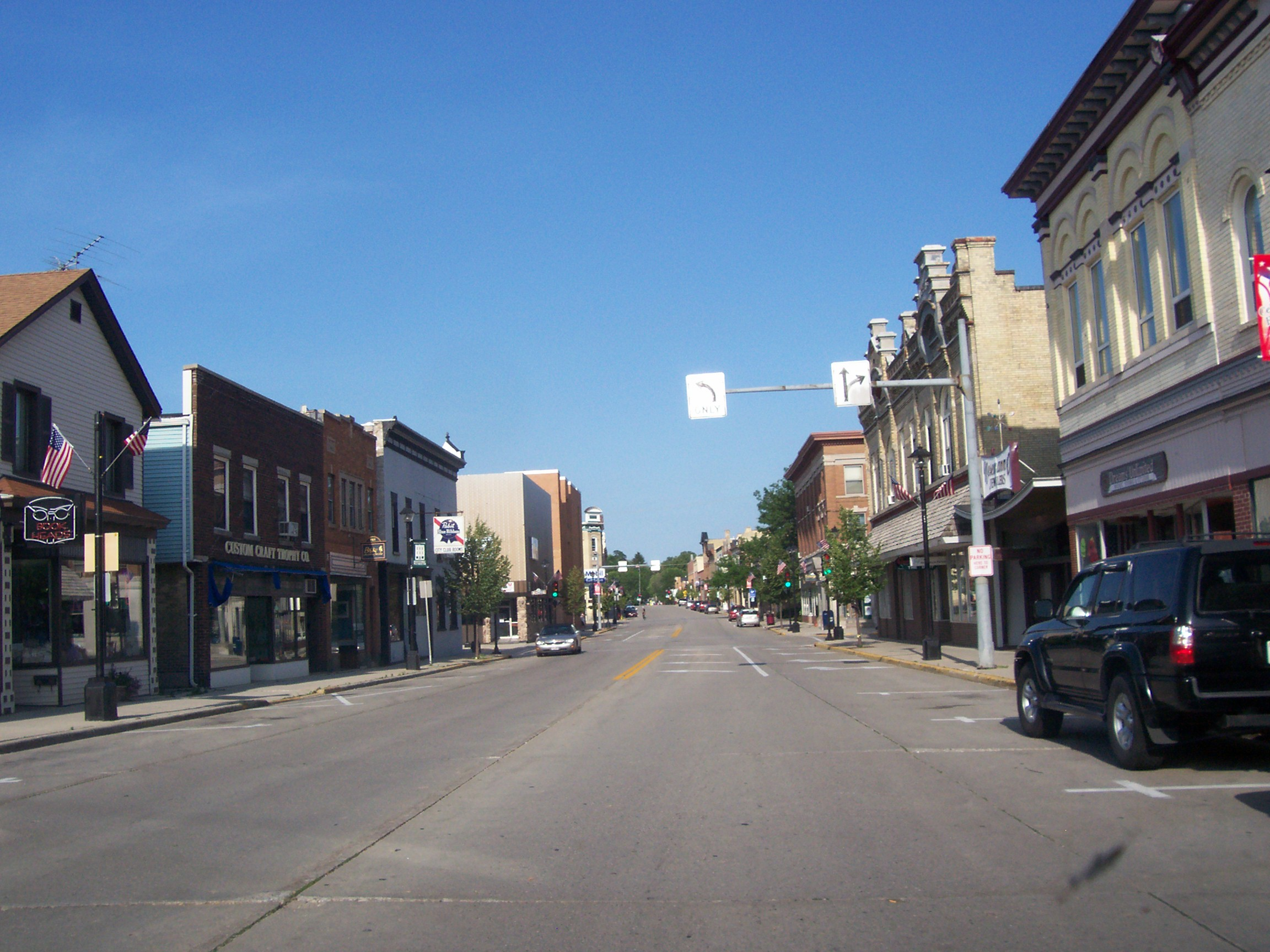
- Downtown Plymouth

- Location of Plymouth in Sheboygan County, Wisconsin.

- Location within Wisconsin Location within the United States
- Coordinates: 43°44′57″N 87°58′36″W
- Country: United States
- State: Wisconsin
- County: Sheboygan

Area
  - Total: 5.43 sq mi (14.06 km^{2})
  - Land: 5.35 sq mi (13.85 km^{2})
  - Water: 0.077 sq mi (0.20 km^{2})
- Elevation: 843 ft (257 m)

Population (2020)
  - Total: 8,932
  - Density: 1,670/sq mi (644.9/km^{2})
- Time zone: UTC-6 (Central (CST))
  - Summer (DST): UTC-5 (CDT)
- Area code: 920
- FIPS code: 55-63700
- GNIS feature ID: 1571709
- Website: www.plymouthwi.gov

Plymouth is a city in Sheboygan County, Wisconsin, United States. The population was 8,932 at the 2020 census. It is part of the Sheboygan, Wisconsin, metropolitan area. Located along the Mullet River, it is surrounded by the Town of Plymouth. It is known as "Hub City" for its former role as a center of wooden wheelwrighting. Advertising itself as "The Cheese Capital of the World," it produces 14% of the cheese consumed in the United States. The mayor is Don Pohlman.

== History ==
Plymouth was surveyed in 1835 by United States General Land Office surveyors. The Mullet river was named after one of the surveyors. The first land sold to a private party was sold on August 13, 1836 to Englishman John Law, who had emigrated from London. The next sale was to Thomas Margrave, also from London. Settlers continued arriving, leading to the Town of Plymouth being organized on April 3, 1849. In the 1840s a group of migrants arrived from Tioga County, Pennsylvania. The Thorpe family arrived from Hartford, Connecticut. The town was named Plymouth, after Plymouth, Massachusetts, where the Pilgrims had landed in 1620.

Originally known by early Native Americans as Quit Qui Oc, or Crooked River, Plymouth was settled in 1845 by Isaac Thorp and others. It was incorporated in 1877. The city is nicknamed "Hub City", both for its central location within Sheboygan County and for its history of manufacturing hubs and spokes for wagons and bicycles.

== Geography ==
According to the United States Census Bureau, the city has a total area of 5.34 square miles (13.83 km^{2}), of which 5.26 square miles (13.62 km^{2}) is land and 0.08 square miles (0.21 km^{2}) is water.

=== Climate ===
Climate data for Plymouth Wastewater Treatment Plant, Wisconsin (1991–2020 normals, extremes 1910–present)
Month	Jan	Feb	Mar	Apr	May	Jun	Jul	Aug	Sep	Oct	Nov	Dec	Year
Record high °F (°C)	60 (16)	71 (22)	84 (29)	89 (32)	94 (34)	101 (38)	107 (42)	101 (38)	98 (37)	88 (31)	75 (24)	67 (19)	107 (42)
Mean daily maximum °F (°C)	26.3 (−3.2)	29.7 (−1.3)	40.5 (4.7)	53.2 (11.8)	65.5 (18.6)	75.7 (24.3)	80.9 (27.2)	78.6 (25.9)	71.8 (22.1)	58.4 (14.7)	44.1 (6.7)	32.1 (0.1)	54.7 (12.6)
Daily mean °F (°C)	18.9 (−7.3)	21.7 (−5.7)	32.0 (0.0)	43.7 (6.5)	55.5 (13.1)	65.4 (18.6)	70.6 (21.4)	68.7 (20.4)	61.1 (16.2)	48.8 (9.3)	36.3 (2.4)	25.2 (−3.8)	45.7 (7.6)
Mean daily minimum °F (°C)	11.6 (−11.3)	13.7 (−10.2)	23.6 (−4.7)	34.2 (1.2)	45.4 (7.4)	55.1 (12.8)	60.3 (15.7)	58.8 (14.9)	50.5 (10.3)	39.3 (4.1)	28.5 (−1.9)	18.3 (−7.6)	36.6 (2.6)
Record low °F (°C)	−29 (−34)	−27 (−33)	−18 (−28)	8 (−13)	21 (−6)	30 (−1)	39 (4)	36 (2)	25 (−4)	6 (−14)	−7 (−22)	−20 (−29)	−29 (−34)
Average precipitation inches (mm)	1.59 (40)	1.41 (36)	1.97 (50)	3.63 (92)	3.83 (97)	4.22 (107)	3.50 (89)	3.69 (94)	2.81 (71)	2.96 (75)	2.14 (54)	1.82 (46)	33.57 (853)
Average snowfall inches (cm)	12.4 (31)	11.0 (28)	5.9 (15)	2.1 (5.3)	0.2 (0.51)	0.0 (0.0)	0.0 (0.0)	0.0 (0.0)	0.0 (0.0)	0.1 (0.25)	2.3 (5.8)	10.7 (27)	44.7 (114)
Average precipitation days (≥ 0.01 in)	9.3	8.5	8.9	11.0	12.9	11.6	10.8	10.2	9.2	10.8	9.1	8.9	121.2
Average snowy days (≥ 0.1 in)	7.4	6.5	3.6	1.3	0.0	0.0	0.0	0.0	0.0	0.1	2.0	6.2	27.1
Source: NOAA

== Demographics ==
Historical population
Census	Pop.	Note	%±
1880	1,052		—
1890	1,503		42.9%
1900	2,257		50.2%
1910	3,094		37.1%
1920	3,415		10.4%
1930	3,882		13.7%
1940	4,170		7.4%
1950	4,543		8.9%
1960	5,128		12.9%
1970	5,810		13.3%
1980	6,027		3.7%
1990	6,769		12.3%
2000	7,781		15.0%
2010	8,445		8.5%
2020	8,932		5.8%
U.S. Decennial Census

Plymouth city, Wisconsin – Racial and ethnic composition Note: the US Census treats Hispanic/Latino as an ethnic category. This table excludes Latinos from the racial categories and assigns them to a separate category. Hispanics/Latinos may be of any race.
Race / Ethnicity (NH = Non-Hispanic)	Pop 2000	Pop 2010	Pop 2020	% 2000	% 2010	% 2020
White alone (NH)	7,600	8,027	8,175	97.67%	95.05%	91.52%
Black or African American alone (NH)	14	31	65	0.18%	0.37%	0.73%
Native American or Alaska Native alone (NH)	17	33	30	0.22%	0.39%	0.34%
Asian alone (NH)	31	61	114	0.40%	0.72%	1.28%
Native Hawaiian or Pacific Islander alone (NH)	0	0	2	0.00%	0.00%	0.02%
Other race alone (NH)	0	1	36	0.00%	0.01%	0.40%
Mixed race or Multiracial (NH)	33	87	234	0.42%	1.03%	2.62%
Hispanic or Latino (any race)	86	205	276	1.11%	2.43%	3.09%
Total	7,781	8,445	8,932	100.00%	100.00%	100.00%

=== 2020 census ===
As of the census of 2020, there were 8,932 people, 4,011 households. The population density was 1,644.9 inhabitants per square mile (635.3/km?). There were 4,251 housing units at an average density of 782.9 per square mile (302.3/km2). The racial makeup of the city was 95.4% White, 1.0% Black or African American, 0.0% American Indian and Alaskan Native, 0.6% Asian, 2.8% Two or more races, 2.2% Hispanic or Latino.

=== 2010 census ===
As of the census of 2010, there were 8,445 people, 3,710 households, and 2,253 families residing in the city. The population density was 1,605.5 inhabitants per square mile (619.9/km^{2}). There were 4,039 housing units at an average density of 767.9 per square mile (296.5/km^{2}). The racial makeup of the city was 96.2% White, 0.4% African American, 0.4% Native American, 0.7% Asian, 0.9% from other races, and 1.4% from two or more races. Hispanic or Latino of any race were 2.4% of the population.

There were 3,710 households, of which 29.1% had children under the age of 18 living with them, 48.4% were married couples living together, 9.2% had a female householder with no husband present, 3.2% had a male householder with no wife present, and 39.3% were non-families. 33.7% of all households were made up of individuals, and 15.2% had someone living alone who was 65 years of age or older. The average household size was 2.26 and the average family size was 2.91.

The median age in the city was 40.8 years. 24.2% of residents were under the age of 18; 6.3% were between the ages of 18 and 24; 24.9% were from 25 to 44; 27.3% were from 45 to 64; and 17.3% were 65 years of age or older. The gender makeup of the city was 47.6% male and 52.4% female.

=== 2000 census ===
As of 2000 the median age in the city was 40.8 years. 24.2% of residents were under the age of 18; 6.3% were between the ages of 18 and 24; 24.9% were from 25 to 44; 27.3% were from 45 to 64; and 17.3% were 65 years of age or older. The gender makeup of the city was 47.6% male and 52.4% female.

=== German community ===
Plymouth has a large ethnic German population, comprising roughly 55% of the population. Per the 2023 American Community Survey five-year estimates, the German-American population was 5,006.

== Economy ==
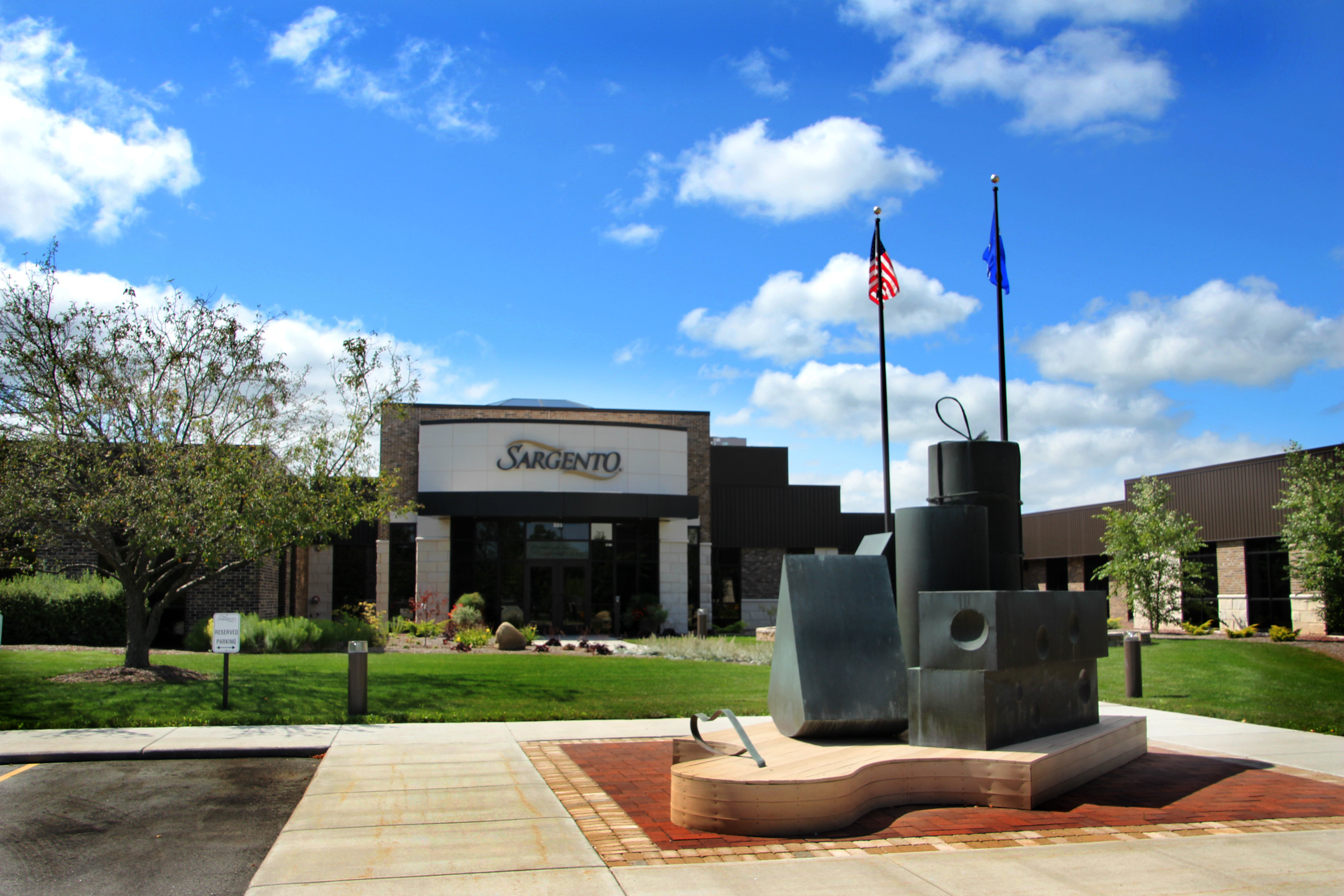
Sargento is one of Plymouth's largest employers

Plymouth, Wisconsin has a long history in the cheese industry. Once the site of the National Cheese Exchange, where cheese commodity prices were set, it now claims the mantle "Cheese Capital of the World" and is home to four cheese processing facilities: Sargento, Masters Gallery, Sartori, Great Lakes Cheese

Plymouth's historic downtown district has a mix of retail, office, and service buildings. The main traffic artery through the city runs through downtown in an area lined with shops, restaurants and other businesses. The downtown has a pedestrian network connecting neighborhoods, schools, parks and commercial areas. Tourism is an important industry for Plymouth.

Plymouth is developing its third business park in partnership with the Plymouth Industrial Development Corporation. Located east of the city limits, it offer rail access and loan and incentive programs. It will join existing parks on the north and south sides of the city. The city collaborates with the Sheboygan County Economic Development Corporation to recruit businessesto the city.

== Arts and culture ==
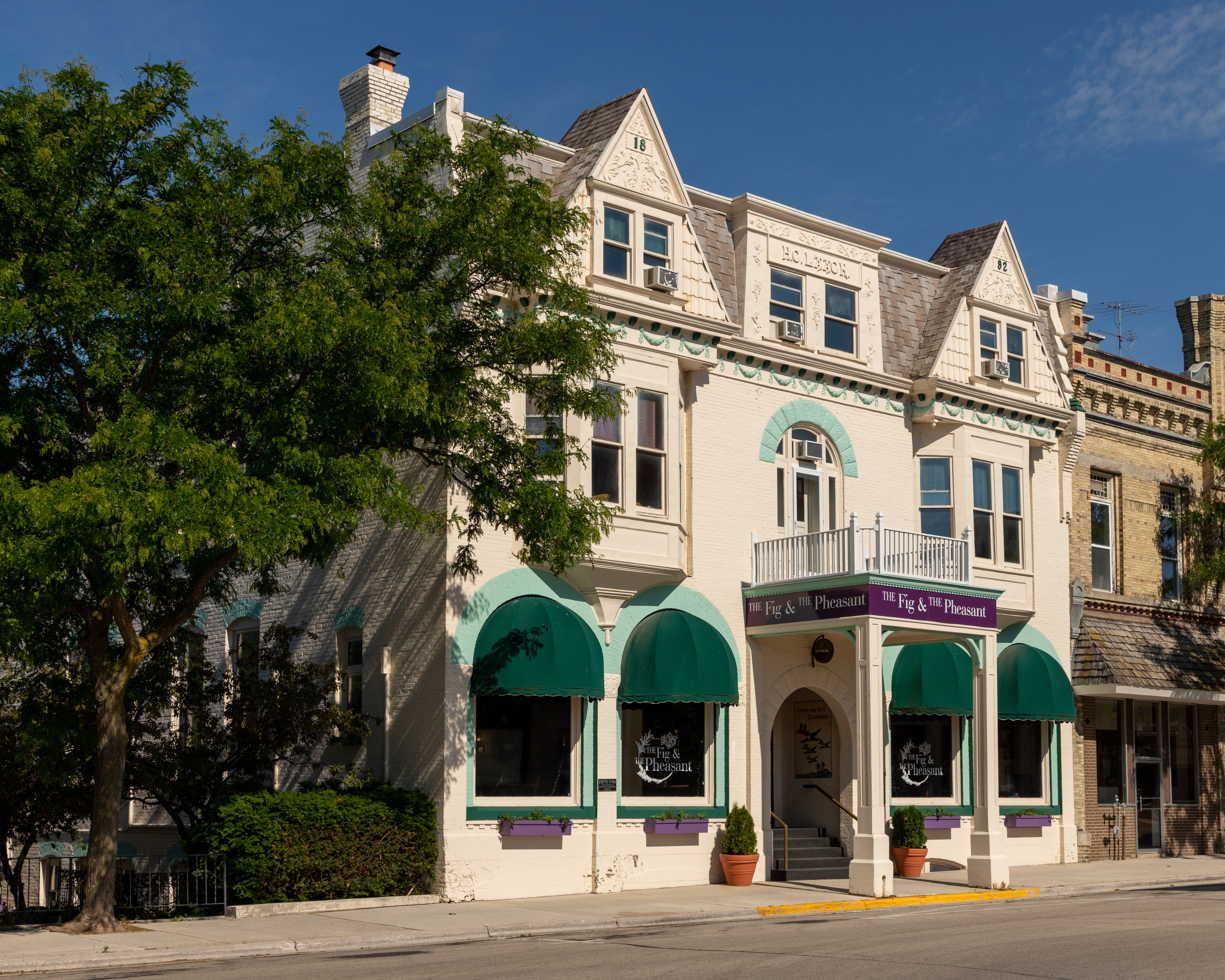
Hotel Laack in downtown Plymouth

Made of fiberglass and standing 20 feet (6.1 m) tall, the statue of Antoinette the cow is a local landmark that honors the area's legacy of dairy production. She was erected in 1977, on the spot where the Wisconsin Cheese Exchange was located in the late 19th century, as part of the city's centennial celebration. She is named after Jack Anton, who led the effort to put up the statue for the celebration.

The Sartori Big Cheese Drop is presented every year on New Year's Eve. Plymouth Arts Center initiated this event in 2007 to pay tribute to Plymouth's cheese heritage and its industry that still exists today.

Murals were painted on downtown buildings during two special events by a group of muralists called the Walldogs. Over 25 murals depict scenes of Plymouth's history.

== Parks and recreation ==
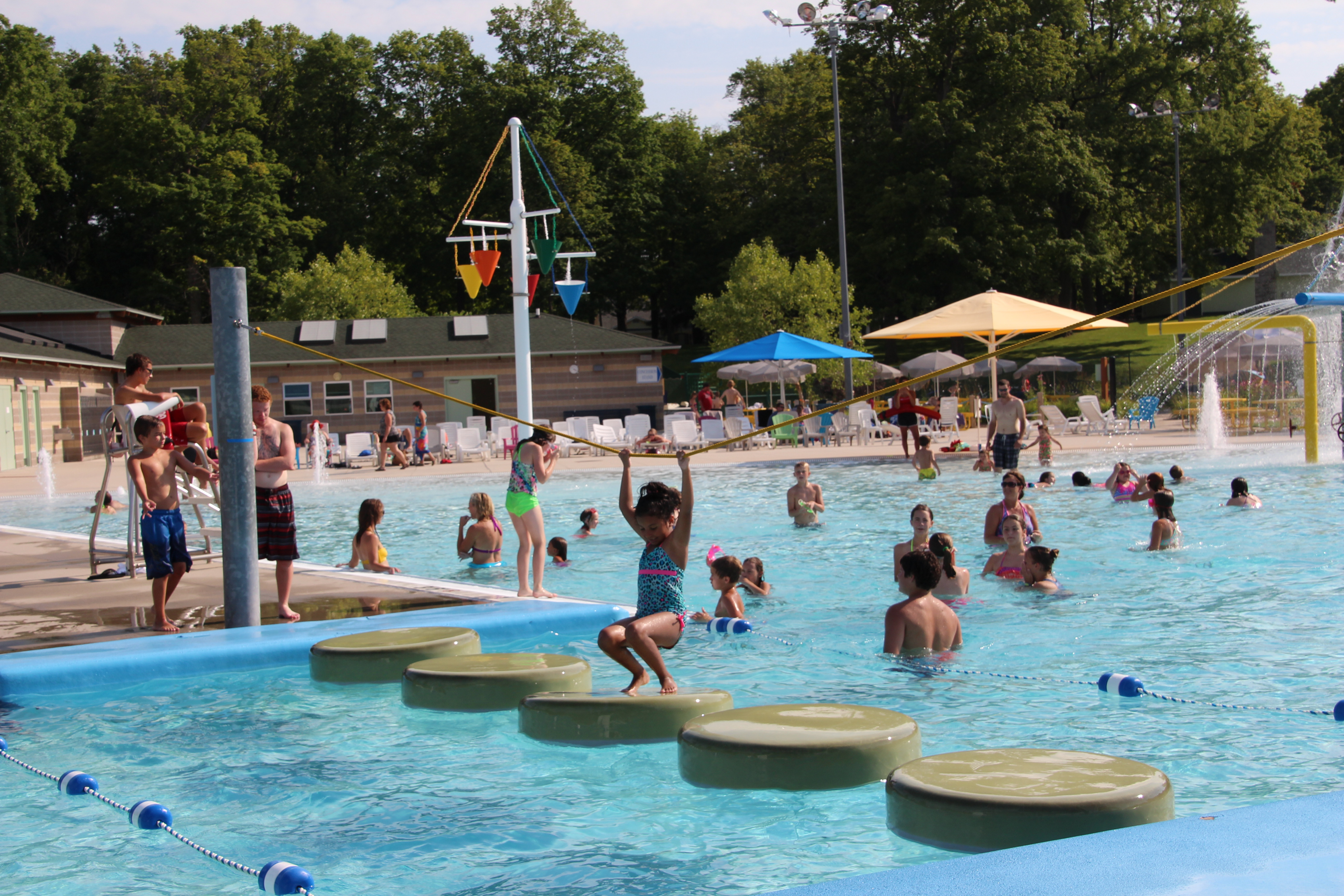
The Plymouth Aquatic Center in City Park

The city has 17 parks that offer recreational opportunities that include baseball (Plymouth Youth Athletic Association), soccer (Plymouth Soccer Club), frisbee-golf, biking, swimming (Plymouth Aquatic Center), tennis, nature walks and more.

Plymouth offers a self-guided walking tour of historic downtown, which includes more than 50 historically significant homes, businesses and buildings, two of which are listed on National Register of Historic Places.

Free concerts are held every Thursday night during the summer at Plymouth City Park. In addition, the Plymouth Arts Center hosts a variety of musical and theatre performances throughout the year.

The Sheboygan County Fair is held every year on Labor Day weekend at Sheboygan County Fair Park in Plymouth.

Festivals in the Plymouth area include the Cheese Festival in early June, the PAC's Cheese Capital Jazz and Blues Crawl for the Arts Fundraiser in August, the Mill Street Festival in July, Road America races and special events and a Holiday Gathering Christmas Parade.

Evergreen Golf Course is a 9-hole course located in Plymouth.

Plymouth Dirt Track Racing runs all summer at Sheboygan County Fair Park

The Plymouth Aquatic Center at City Park is a zero-depth-entry pool with waterslides, a sand play area and concessions.

Plymouth High School's indoor pool is open to the community during open swim times.

Downhill skiing is available at Nutt Hill in Plymouth, which opens once there is 10 inches of snow on the ground.

== Education ==
The Plymouth Joint School District serves the communities of Plymouth and nearby Cascade. It has three elementary schools, Riverview Middle School, and Plymouth High School. The Plymouth Joint School District is supported by the Plymouth Education Foundation, which provides scholarships, honors successful teachers, and raises funds for facility improvements.

St. John the Baptist Catholic School and St. John Lutheran School serve children in 3-K through eighth grade.

== Transportation ==
Plymouth is located along State Highways 57, 67 and 23. Rail access is provided by the Wisconsin and Southern Railway Company (WSOR). Sheboygan County Memorial Airport (KSBM) is seven miles away.

A single-track railroad branch line between Plymouth and Sheboygan runs through the city. Built by the Chicago & North Western (C&NW) Railroad, the track originally paralleled the electric interurban Wisconsin Power & Light line, which terminated at Elkhart Lake. In later years it was primarily a freight line for the Chicago and North Western Transportation Company, and Union Pacific after Union Pacific acquired the C&NW in 1995. In 2006, citing low demand and degraded infrastructure, Union Pacific announced plans to abandon the line west of the Kohler Company factory in Kohler, thus terminating all service to Sheboygan Falls. In 2009, the Wisconsin Department of Transportation purchased the Plymouth-Sheboygan Falls portion of the line from Union Pacific, with the intent of repairing the long dormant line to allow the Wisconsin & Southern Railroad to provide restored service to Plymouth by 2015.

Plymouth is served by the Sheboygan County Memorial Airport (KSBM), located several miles east of the city.

== Utilities ==
Electrical, water and sewerage service is provided by the municipally owned Plymouth Utilities. Natural gas service provided by Wisconsin Public Service.

Frontier Communications provides landline telephone service along with broadband DSL services and maintains a central office downtown. Spectrum is the city's cable provider.

== Notable people ==
- Daniel P. Anderson, presiding judge of the Wisconsin Court of Appeals
- Vera Eugenia Andrus, artist and printmaker
- Theodore Benfey, Wisconsin state senator
- Bill B. Bruhy, Wisconsin state representative and mayor of Plymouth
- Tony Evers, governor of Wisconsin
- Emil Fischer, president of the Green Bay Packers
- Val Heim, baseball player
- Beau Hoopman, Head Coach of University of Wisconsin-Madison Men's Rowing Team and Olympic gold medalist
- Frederick W. Krez, Wisconsin state representative
- Edwin J. Larson, Wisconsin state representative
- Walt Lautenbach, basketball player
- Major C. Mead, Wisconsin state senator
- Bill Prietzel, racing driver
- Otto Puhlman, Wisconsin state representative and first mayor of Plymouth
- Patrick Henry Smith, Wisconsin state senator
- Tyler Vorpagel, Wisconsin state representative
- Allen F. Warden, Wisconsin state representative
