= 2023 F1600 Championship Series =

13th season of the F1600 Championship Series

2023 F1600 season

Season
- Races: 21
- Start date: March 23
- End date: August 20

Awards
- Drivers' champion: (United States) Porter Aiken
- Manufacturers' Cup: (United States) Piper

The 2023 F1600 Championship Series season was the twelfth season of the F1600 Championship Series. The season began on March 23 at Road Atlanta, and ended on August 20 at Summit Point Motorsports Park.

The previous year's champion, Thomas Schrage of Rice Race Prep, moved up to the USF2000 Championship on the Road to Indy ladder. The championship was won by Porter Aiken. Ayrton Houk and Jack Sullivan went on to be Team USA scholars and raced in the Formula Ford Festival as well as the Walter Hayes Trophy in the United Kingdom.

== Drivers and teams ==
Pro Division
Team/Sponsor	No.	Drivers	Class	Rounds	Chassis	Engine
Arrive Drive Motorsports	91	(United States) BJ Shaw	R	1–6, 13–15	Spectrum	Honda
Arrive Drive Motorsports	93	(United States) Austin Holtgraewe	R	1–6, 10–15, 19–21	Spectrum	Honda
(United States) Raceworks	11	(United States) Christopher Kierce		1–6, 10–15, 19–21	Spectrum	Honda
(United States) Raceworks	48	(United States) John Kierce		13–15	Van Diemen	Honda
(United States) Raceworks	70	(United States) Sam Lockwood	M	1–6, 13–15	Spectrum	Honda
(Canada) Rice Race Prep	01	(United States) Ely Navarro	R	1–12	Mygale	Honda
(Canada) Rice Race Prep	01	(United States) Ayrton Houk		13–15	Mygale	Honda
(Canada) Rice Race Prep	01	(United States) Michael Bulzacchelli		19–21	Mygale	Honda
(Canada) Rice Race Prep	02	(United States) Ayrton Houk		4–12, 16–21	Mygale	Honda
(Canada) Rice Race Prep	02	(Canada) Misha Goikhberg		1–3	Mygale	Honda
(Canada) Rice Race Prep	03	(United States) Steve Jenks	R M	1–3	Mygale	Honda
(Canada) Rice Race Prep	03	(Canada) Misha Goikhberg		7–9	Mygale	Honda
(Canada) Rice Race Prep	03	(United States) Jason Pribyl		13–18	Mygale	Honda
(Canada) Rice Race Prep	03	(United States) Gordon Scully		19–21	Mygale	Honda
(United States) Team Pelfrey	80	(United States) Sebastian Mateo Naranjo		All	Mygale	Honda
(United States) Team Pelfrey	81	(United States) Dillion Defonce	R	1–9	Mygale	Honda
(United States) Team Pelfrey	81	(United States) Connor Willis	R	16–18	Mygale	Honda
(United States) Team Pelfrey	82	(United States) Karsten Defonce	R	1–9	Mygale	Honda
(United States) Team Pelfrey	83	(United States) Ken Bouquillion	M	1–3, 7–18	Mygale	Honda
(United States) Team Pelfrey	84	(United States) David Adorno	M	1–18	Mygale	Honda
(United States) Team Pelfrey	88	(United States) Dexter Czuba		7–9	Mygale	Honda
(United States) Team Pelfrey	88	(United States) Hugh Esterson		10–12	Mygale	Honda
Dietz Racing	18	(United States) Robert Dietz		4–6, 10–12	Van Diemen	Honda
Dietz Racing	22	(United States) James Dietz	R M	4–6, 10–12	Van Diemen	Honda
(United States) Drivers Services	2	(United States) Mike Scanlan	M	All	Spectrum	Honda
(United States) Drivers Services	18	(United States) Gary Gecelter	M	7–9, 16–18	Spectrum	Honda
(United States) Drivers Services	21	(United States) Dave Petzko	M	All	Spectrum	Honda
(United States) Drivers Services	22	(United States) Wes Allen	R	7–9	Swift	Honda
(United States) Drivers Services	23	(Australia) Eddie Beswick	R	13–18	Spectrum	Honda
(United States) Drivers Services	26	(United States) Charles Anti		1–3, 10–12	Van Diemen	Honda
Steele Carreras	7	(United States) Timothy Steele		1–9, 13–15, 19–21	Van Diemen	Honda
Steele Carreras	75	(United States) Timothy Steele		10–12	Van Diemen	Honda
(United States) Lee Racing	0	(United States) Jonathan Lee		1–3	Swift	Honda
(United States) Lee Racing	00	(United States) Jonathan Lee		4–6	Swift	Honda
(United States) Lee Racing	00	(United States) James Morgan	R M	1–3	Swift	Honda
Tovo Motorsports	031	(United States) Jackson Tovo	R	19–21	Mygale	
Tovo Motorsports	13	(United States) Ethan Tovo	R	19–21	Mygale	
(United States) Auriana Racing	3	(United States) Joe Colasacco	M	1–12, 16–18	Van Diemen	Ford / Honda
Fatboy Racing	4	(United States) Michael Siracusano	R	16–18		
Dole Racing	4	(United States) John Dole		19–21	Mygale	
Kelly Moss Inc.	8	(United States) Theodore Burns		1–6, 10–15, 19–21	Piper	
Aero Metals	9	(United States) Robert Stowell	M	10–15, 19–21	Spectrum	
PT&T Motorsports	12	(United States) Bob Reid	M	1–18	Citation	
PT&T Motorsports	12	(United States) Bob Reid	M	19–21	Spectrum	
IronRock Motorsports	09	(United States) Camryn Reed	R	13–15	Piper	
IronRock Motorsports	14	(United States) Cooper Shipman	R	1–3, 7–9, 19–21	Piper	
(United States) Steve Roux Racing	16	(United States) Steve Roux	M	7–9	Wyvern	
Wyvern	16	(United States) Steve Roux	M	1–3, 16–21	Wyvern	
(United States) Sullivan Racing	19	(United States) Jack Sullivan		1–18	Piper	Honda
	22	Kenneth Suied	G	16–18		
Practical Precision Engineering	30	(United States) Will Velkoff		7–12, 16–21	Van Diemen	
MAJ Performance	31	(United States) Scott Rubenzer	M	1–6, 10–15, 19–21	Spectrum	Honda
Red Arrow Racing	32	(United States) Trevor Russell		13–21	Ray FF	Honda
Home Tech Consultants	41	(United States) Robert Albani	M	1–3, 7–12	Mygale	
Cordova Racing	42	(United States) Joe Parsons	M	16–21	Spectrum	
CT Motorsports	45	(United States) Karsten Defonce	R	16–18	Piper	
Kingham Racing	47	(United States) Phil Kingham	M	4–6, 10–15, 19–21	Spectrum	
(Canada) Britain West Motorsports	65	(Canada) Callum Baxter		1–9	Mygale	Honda
DBM Racing	72	(United States) Steve Oseth		10–12, 16–21	Citation	
BPMS - Bell Helmets	73	(United States) Robert Perona	M	1–3	Piper	
BPMS - Bell Helmets	76	(United States) Robert Perona	M	7–9	Piper	
ThermaMasters	85	(United States) David Livingston Jr.	M	1–6, 10–15	Spectrum	Honda
Brumbaugh Racing	86	(United States) Kevin Brumbaugh	M	1–3	Van Diemen	
(United States) Lavender Competition	96	(United States) Brandon Lavender		13–15	Van Diemen	
Bulzacchelli Racing	98	(United States) Michael Bulzacchelli		1–9	Piper	Honda
(United States) Chillout Motorsports / Aiken Racing	99	(United States) Porter Aiken		All	Piper	Honda
Tatman Motorsports	122	(United States) Hunter Tatman	R	13–15	Van Diemen	
FRP F1600 Championship Series 2023

Icon	Class
M	Masters
R	Rookie
G	Guest

== Schedule ==
Rd.	Date	Track	Location
1	March 23–26	Road Atlanta	(Georgia (U.S. state)) Braselton, Georgia
2	March 23–26	Road Atlanta	(Georgia (U.S. state)) Braselton, Georgia
3	March 23–26	Road Atlanta	(Georgia (U.S. state)) Braselton, Georgia
4	April 28–30	Mid-Ohio Sports Car Course	Lexington, Ohio
5	April 28–30	Mid-Ohio Sports Car Course	Lexington, Ohio
6	April 28–30	Mid-Ohio Sports Car Course	Lexington, Ohio
7	May 26–29	Lime Rock Park	Salisbury, Connecticut
8	May 26–29	Lime Rock Park	Salisbury, Connecticut
9	May 26–29	Lime Rock Park	Salisbury, Connecticut
10	June 8–11	Pittsburgh International Race Complex	Wampum, Pennsylvania
11	June 8–11	Pittsburgh International Race Complex	Wampum, Pennsylvania
12	June 8–11	Pittsburgh International Race Complex	Wampum, Pennsylvania
13	July 6–9	Road America	Plymouth, Wisconsin
14	July 6–9	Road America	Plymouth, Wisconsin
15	July 6–9	Road America	Plymouth, Wisconsin
16	July 28–30	New Jersey Motorsports Park	Millville, New Jersey
17	July 28–30	New Jersey Motorsports Park	Millville, New Jersey
18	July 28–30	New Jersey Motorsports Park	Millville, New Jersey
19	August 18–20	Summit Point Motorsports Park	Summit Point, West Virginia
20	August 18–20	Summit Point Motorsports Park	Summit Point, West Virginia
21	August 18–20	Summit Point Motorsports Park	Summit Point, West Virginia
References: Formula Race Promotions Confirms 2023 Schedule

== Results & performance summaries ==
Round	Circuit	Location	Date	Pole position	Fastest lap	Winning driver	Masters class winner	Supporting
1	Road Atlanta	(Georgia (U.S. state)) Braselton, Georgia	March 25	(United States) Ely Navarro	(United States) Jonathan Lee	(United States) Porter Aiken	(United States) Robert Perona	F2000 Championship Series; North American Formula F1000 Championship; Atlantic Championship; SVRA Sprint Series; Trans-Am Series
2	Road Atlanta	(Georgia (U.S. state)) Braselton, Georgia	March 25		(United States) Joe Colasacco	(United States) Robert Perona	(United States) Robert Perona	F2000 Championship Series; North American Formula F1000 Championship; Atlantic Championship; SVRA Sprint Series; Trans-Am Series
3	Road Atlanta	(Georgia (U.S. state)) Braselton, Georgia	March 26		(United States) Robert Perona	(United States) Porter Aiken	(United States) Joe Colasacco	F2000 Championship Series; North American Formula F1000 Championship; Atlantic Championship; SVRA Sprint Series; Trans-Am Series
4	Mid-Ohio Sports Car Course	Lexington, Ohio	April 29	(United States) Ayrton Houk	(United States) Jack Sullivan	(United States) Jack Sullivan	(United States) Joe Colasacco	F2000 Championship Series; North American Formula F1000 Championship; Atlantic Championship; Formula Vee Challenge Cup Series
5	Mid-Ohio Sports Car Course	Lexington, Ohio	April 30		(United States) Ayrton Houk	(United States) Ely Navarro	(United States) David Adorno	F2000 Championship Series; North American Formula F1000 Championship; Atlantic Championship; Formula Vee Challenge Cup Series
6	Mid-Ohio Sports Car Course	Lexington, Ohio	April 30		(United States) Jack Sullivan	(United States) Jack Sullivan	(United States) Scott Rubenzer	F2000 Championship Series; North American Formula F1000 Championship; Atlantic Championship; Formula Vee Challenge Cup Series
7	Lime Rock Park	Salisbury, Connecticut	May 27	(United States) Ely Navarro	(United States) Porter Aiken	(United States) Jack Sullivan	(United States) Joe Colasacco	F2000 Championship Series; North American Formula F1000 Championship; SVRA Sprint Series; Trans-Am Series
8	Lime Rock Park	Salisbury, Connecticut	May 29		(United States) Ely Navarro	(United States) Ayrton Houk	(United States) Ken Bouquillion	F2000 Championship Series; North American Formula F1000 Championship; SVRA Sprint Series; Trans-Am Series
9	Lime Rock Park	Salisbury, Connecticut	May 29		(United States) Jack Sullivan	(United States) Porter Aiken	(United States) Joe Colasacco	F2000 Championship Series; North American Formula F1000 Championship; SVRA Sprint Series; Trans-Am Series
10	Pittsburgh International Race Complex	Wampum, Pennsylvania	June 10	(United States) Porter Aiken	(United States) Sebastian Mateo Naranjo	(United States) Ayrton Houk	(United States) David Adorno	F2000 Championship Series; North American Formula F1000 Championship; Atlantic Championship; Formula Vee Challenge Cup Series
11	Pittsburgh International Race Complex	Wampum, Pennsylvania	June 11		(United States) Porter Aiken	(United States) Porter Aiken	(United States) David Adorno	F2000 Championship Series; North American Formula F1000 Championship; Atlantic Championship; Formula Vee Challenge Cup Series
12	Pittsburgh International Race Complex	Wampum, Pennsylvania	June 11		(United States) Jack Sullivan	(United States) Sebastian Mateo Naranjo	(United States) Ken Bouquillion	F2000 Championship Series; North American Formula F1000 Championship; Atlantic Championship; Formula Vee Challenge Cup Series
13	Road America	Plymouth, Wisconsin	July 8	(United States) Jack Sullivan	(United States) Theodore Burns	(United States) Porter Aiken	(United States) Ken Bouquillion	F2000 Championship Series; North American Formula F1000 Championship; Atlantic Championship; Trans-Am Series
14	Road America	Plymouth, Wisconsin	July 9		(United States) Porter Aiken	(Australia) Eddie Beswick	(United States) Scott Rubenzer	F2000 Championship Series; North American Formula F1000 Championship; Atlantic Championship; Trans-Am Series
15	Road America	Plymouth, Wisconsin	July 9		(United States) Timothy Steele	(United States) Jack Sullivan	(United States) Scott Rubenzer	F2000 Championship Series; North American Formula F1000 Championship; Atlantic Championship; Trans-Am Series
16	New Jersey Motorsports Park	Millville, New Jersey	July 29	(United States) Ayrton Houk	(United States) Porter Aiken	(United States) Jack Sullivan	(United States) Joe Colasacco	F2000 Championship Series; North American Formula F1000 Championship; Formula Regional Americas Championship; Formula 4 United States Championship; SVRA Sprint Series
17	New Jersey Motorsports Park	Millville, New Jersey	July 30		(United States) Jason Pribyl	(United States) Porter Aiken	(United States) Ken Bouquillion	F2000 Championship Series; North American Formula F1000 Championship; Formula Regional Americas Championship; Formula 4 United States Championship; SVRA Sprint Series
18	New Jersey Motorsports Park	Millville, New Jersey	July 30		(United States) Ayrton Houk	(Australia) Eddie Beswick	(United States) Joe Colasacco	F2000 Championship Series; North American Formula F1000 Championship; Formula Regional Americas Championship; Formula 4 United States Championship; SVRA Sprint Series
19	Summit Point Motorsports Park	Summit Point, West Virginia	August 19	(United States) Porter Aiken	(United States) Porter Aiken	(United States) Theodore Burns	(United States) Scott Rubenzer	F2000 Championship Series; North American Formula F1000 Championship; Atlantic Championship; SVRA Sprint Series; Formula Vee Challenge Cup Series
20	Summit Point Motorsports Park	Summit Point, West Virginia	August 20		(United States) Porter Aiken	(United States) Porter Aiken	(United States) Scott Rubenzer	F2000 Championship Series; North American Formula F1000 Championship; Atlantic Championship; SVRA Sprint Series; Formula Vee Challenge Cup Series
21	Summit Point Motorsports Park	Summit Point, West Virginia	August 20		(United States) Scott Rubenzer	(United States) Ayrton Houk	(United States) Scott Rubenzer	F2000 Championship Series; North American Formula F1000 Championship; Atlantic Championship; SVRA Sprint Series; Formula Vee Challenge Cup Series

== Scoring system ==
Points are awarded to the top twenty-five classified drivers, and the top drivers who are able to achieve the Pole Position or the Fastest Lap during the qualify session are awarded with the corresponding +3 and +2 bonus points.

The Season Championship will recognize only each driver's best 18 of 21 race results including all bonus points earned.

Points are awarded using the following system:

Position	1st	2nd	3rd	4th	5th	6th	7th	8th	9th	10th	11th	12th	13th	14th	15th	16th	17th	18th	19th	20th	21st	22nd	23rd	24th	25th+	DNF
Points	50	42	37	34	31	29	27	25	23	21	19	17	15	13	11	10	9	8	7	6	5	4	3	2	1	1

Guest drivers are ineligible to score points.

== Driver standings ==
Pos	Driver	RAT			MOH			LRP			PITT			RA			NJMP			SP			Pts	Drop Points
1	**(United States) Porter Aiken**	1	3	1	2	4	2	2	21	1	**2**	1	3	1	4	5	2	1	6	**2**	1	DNS	**827**	793
2	**(United States) Ayrton Houk**				**3**	3	3	5	1	3	1	2	2	3	5	3	**3**	3	2	4	10	1	699	699
3	**(United States) Jack Sullivan**	9	4	5	1	2 (Note: 01 & 19 Found in violation of: 1.67.16.11: Yellow (Mandatory Compliance Flags). Loss of 5 race points.)	1	1	DNS	8	3	22	9	**8**	3	1	1	4	3				608	608
4	**(United States)** **Sebastian Mateo Naranjo**	2	7	19	7	6	8	9	11	5	4	3	1 (Note: 80 found to be in violation of 1.6.17.6: BLOCKING. Loss of 10 race points & loss of purse.)	4	2	4	4	5	5	3	20	3	**629**	597
5	**(United States) Theodore Burns**	8	9	9	6	23	5				8	8	8	5	6	2				1	23	2	408	408
6	**(United States) Joe Colasacco**	12	11	4	10	12	12	6	7	2	11	9	7				7	9	7				371	371
7	**(United States) Ely Navarro**	**27**	2	3	4	1	4	**3**	22 (Note: 01 Found in violation of: 1.6.17.5: SAFE PASS & 1.6.17.3: AVOIDABLE CONTACT. Loss of 15 Championship points)	4	7	4	5										353	353
8	**(United States) Timothy Steele**	13	10	7	8	24	25	7	DNF	DNS	5	5	4	17	11	7				10	3	18	338	338
9	**(United States) Scott Rubenzer**	16	12	DNF	12	15	11				21	10	11	7	7	6				6	2	4	310	310
10	**(United States) Ken Bouquillion**	18	16	24				13	4	11	10	7	6	6	9	9	8	8	20				291	291
11	**(United States) David Adorno**	10	13	13	20	11	14	DNF	23	22	9	6	10	DNF	18	13	10	12	9				255	255
12	**(Canada) Callum Baxter**	4	6	2	5	26	7	8	5	12													237	237
13	**(United States) Dillion Defonce**	7	8	8	11	7	6	12	3	14													219	219
14	**(Australia) Eddie Beswick**													9	1	11	6	2	1				213	213
15	**(United States) Christopher Kierce**	28	18	17	14	8	13				17	17	21	12	10	10				12	25	6	200	200
16	**(United States) Mike Scanlan**	23	22	25	22	19	20	20	15	20	15	16	15	13	15	17	11	18	12	23	12	10	**200**	193
17	**(United States) Robert Perona**	3	1	6				16	6	6													186	186
18	**(United States) Will Velkoff**							17	14	21	DNS	13	12				12	13	10	11	7	7	185	185
19	**(United States) Bob Reid**	20	19	27	18	14	17	18	16	16	DNF (Note: 12 found in violation of: 1.6.17.3: AVOIDABLE CONTACT. Loss of 15 Race points.)	19	19	19	17	24	15	16	15	14	15	9	**169**	180
20	**(United States) Karsten Defonce**	11	23	16	25	9	15	11	8	13							13	10	18				170	170
21	**(United States) Jonathan Lee**	5	5	10	9	5	10																160	160
22	**(United States) Charles Anti**	17	14	12							12	12	13							7	4	16	159	159
23	**(United States) Jason Pribyl**													2	8	8	DNF (Note: 03 found in violation of: 1.6.17.3: AVOIDABLE CONTACT. Loss of 10 Race points.)	6	4				**148**	157
24	**(United States) Dave Petzko**	25	24	28	23	21	23	22	19	18	18	18	24	20	20	23	17	15	14	15	13	11	**145**	141
25	**(United States) Michael Bulzacchelli**	30	DNF	14	17	10	9	14	13	DNF (Note: 98 found to have exhibited a lack of spatial awareness, and in violation of 1.6.17.3: AVOIDABLE CONTACT. Self Penalized and a Loss of 10 Race points.)										25	6	21	**122**	131
26	**(United States) David Livingston Jr.**	14	15	18	13	17	16				14	11	14	DNF	DNS	12							129	129
27	**(United States) Cooper Shipman**	22	27	22				DNF	10	9										8	5	12	127	127
28	**(Canada) Misha Goikhberg**	6	31	11				4	2	DNS													125	125
29	**(United States) Steve Oseth**										DNF	14	17				9	14	11	13	16	22	107	107
30	**(United States) BJ Shaw**	15	21	15	24 (Note: 91 Found in violation of: 1.6.17.3: AVOIDABLE CONTACT & 1.6.17.5: SAFE PASS. Loss of 10 race points for the contact, and 5 race points as 82 was unable to continue.)	13	26							11	13	16							**74**	87
31	**(United States) Trevor Russell**													10	24	DNS	DNF (Note: 32 found in violation of: 1.6.17.3: AVOIDABLE CONTACT. Loss of 10 Race points.)	11	19	5	17	20	**71**	86
32	**(United States) Connor Willis**																5	7	8				83	83
33	**(United States) Robert Albani**	21	20	23				15	12	10	13	DNF	DNS										79	79
34	**(United States) Austin Holtgraewe**	29	29	26	26	20	24				20	23	23	22	22	20				20	19	8	76	76
35	**(United States) Phil Kingham**				19	16	18				DNF	DNF	18	15	19	15				22	24	23	73	73
36	**(United States) Steve Roux**	DNS	28	30				DNF	18	19							18	17	16	19	18	14	73	73
37	**(United States) Ethan Tovo**																			9	11	5	73	73
38	**(United States) Dexter Czuba**							10	9	7													71	71
39	**(United States) Gary Gecelter**							19	17	15							14	19	13				62	62
40	**(United States) Sam Lockwood**	24	26	21	21	18	19							18	21	19							48	48
41	**(United States) Robert Dietz**				16	25	22				16	15	16										46	46
42	**(United States) Jackson Tovo**																			17	9	15	43	43
43	**(United States) Joe Parsons**																16	DNF	17	18	22	17	41	41
44	**(United States) Camryn Reed**													14	14	14							39	39
45	**(United States) John Dole**																			16	14	13	38	38
46	**(United States) James Dietz**				15	22	21				19	21	22										36	36
47	**(United States) Gordon Scully**																			24	8	19	34	34
48	**(United States) Hugh Esterson**										6	DNF	25										31	31
49	**(United States) Robert Stowell**										DNF	20	20	DNS	DNS	21				21	21	DNF	29	29
50	**(United States) Brandon Lavender**													16	16	18							28	28
51	**(United States) Steve Jenks**	19	17	20																			22	22
52	**(United States) Wes Allen**							21	20	17													20	20
53	**(United States) Hunter Tatman**													DNF	12	25							19	19
54	**(United States) John Kierce**													21	23	22							12	12
55	**(United States) Michael Siracusano**																19	DNS	DNS				7	7
56	**(United States) James Morgan**	26	25	29																			3	3
57	**(United States) Kevin Brumbaugh**	DNF	30	DNS																			2	2
Drivers ineligible for points
	**Kenneth Suied**																DNS	Wth	Wth					
Pos	Driver	RAT			MOH			LRP			PITT			RA			NJMP			SP			Pts	Drop Points
References: FRP Official Points Standings & Championship Series Central & Race Monitor

Color	Result
Gold	Winner
Silver	2nd-place finish
Bronze	3rd-place finish
Green	Top 5 finish
Light Blue	Top 10 finish
Dark Blue	Other flagged position
Purple	Did not finish (DNF)
Brown	Withdrew (Wth)
Black	Disqualified (DSQ)
White	Did Not Start (DNS)
White	Race abandoned (C)
Blank	Did not participate

**In-line notation**
**Bold**	Pole position (3 points)
Italics	Fastest lap of the race (2 points)

Master of the Year
Masters

== Incident reports ==
- Mid-Ohio 2023 - F1600 Penalty Report
- Lime Rock Park 2023 - F1600 Penalty Report
- PIRC 2023 - F1600 Penalty Report
- NJMP 2023 - F1600 Penalty Report

== Video on YouTube ==
Race 1 of Road Atlanta: FRP F1600 Feature Race 1 Road Atlanta
Race 2 of Road Atlanta: FRP F1600 Feature Race 2 Road Atlanta
Race 3 of Road Atlanta: FRP F1600 Race 3 Road Atlanta
Race 1 of Lime Rock Park: FRP 1600, Feature Race 1 at Lime Rock Park (FULL RACE)

== See also ==
- 2023 F2000 Championship Series
