= 2023 Atlantic Championship =

Motorsport racing series

2023 Atlantic Championship Series season

Season
- Races: 10
- Start date: March 23
- End date: August 20

Awards
- 016 Class Champion Open Class Champion: (United States) Jimmy Simpson (United States) Austin Hill

The 2023 Atlantic Championship Series season was the tenth season of the revived Atlantic Championship. The series is organized by Formula Race Promotions and sanctioned by SCCA Pro Racing.

The season was held over five weekends from March to August 2023.

Jimmy Simpson and Austin Hill won the 016 Class and Open Class titles respectively. Both clinched their titles during the penultimate race weekend at Road America.

== Drivers ==
Drivers competed in two classes, either in the 016 Class or in the Open Class.

=== 016 Class entries ===
Team	No.	Driver	Car	Rounds
K-Hill Motorsports	6	(United States) Christopher Ash	Swift 016	1
K-Hill Motorsports	67	(United States) Christopher Ash	Swift 016	3
K-Hill Motorsports	24	(United States) Matthew Butson	2006 Swift 016a	5
K-Hill Motorsports	21 (Note: Jimmy Simpson and Tonis Kasemets shared the No. 21 entry for round four, with Simpson driving race 1 and Kasemets driving race 2)	(United States) Jimmy Simpson	2006 Swift 016-A	1–4
K-Hill Motorsports	21	(Estonia) Tõnis Kasemets	2006 Swift 016	4
K-Hill Motorsports	63	(United States) Jim Booth	2005 Swift 016/Mazda	1–2
K-Hill Motorsports	66	(United States) Richard Zober	2006 Swift 016a Mazda	1–2, 4–5
K-Hill Motorsports	74	(United States) Dudley Fleck	2006 Swift 016 Mazda	1–2, 4
K-Hill Motorsports	84	(United States) Peter Ruggiero	2006 Swift 016a	4
Polestar	29	(United States) David Grant	2006 Swift 016	3–4
Polestar	40	(United States) Keith Grant	2017 PMR-17	1, 3–4
Ave Motorsports	44	(United States) Tony Ave	2005 Swift 016/Mazda/2300	1
One Motorsports	71	(United States) Chip Romer	2006 Swift 016	1, 3–4

=== Open Class entries ===
Team	No.	Driver	Car	Rounds
JENSEN	1	(Sweden) Oliver Westling	2019 Ligier JS F3	2
JENSEN	2	(United States) Everett Stack	2018 Ligier JS F4	5
IGY6 Motorsports	3	(United States) Hayden Bowlsbey	Ligier JS F3	2
Puma	5	(United States) Robert Wright	2022 Ligier JS F3	1, 4
K-Hill Motorsports	06	(United States) Bruce Hamilton	2001 Swift 014 MZR	4–5
K-Hill Motorsports	32	(United States) Kirk Kindsfater	2002 Swift 014 FA	4
Austin Hill Motorsports	8	(United States) Austin Hill	2019 Ligier JS F3	1–4
Robert Talbott Motorsports	17	(United States) Bob Corliss	2001 Swift 014.a	1, 3–5
Wisko Racing	63	(United States) Jim Booth	2018 Ligier	4
Antonelli Law	171	(United States) Jeffrey Antonelli	2006 Star Pro Mazda	4

== Race calendar ==
The schedule was announced on October 12, 2022. The series did not return to Barber Motorsports Park, instead opting for a round at Summit Point Motorsports Park for the first time since 2018.

Round		Circuit	Date	Support bill	Map of circuit locations
1	R1	(Georgia (U.S. state)) Road Atlanta, Braselton	March 25	SVRA Sprint Series & Endurance; Trans-Am Series	2023 Atlantic Championship is located in the United States
1	R2	(Georgia (U.S. state)) Road Atlanta, Braselton	March 26	SVRA Sprint Series & Endurance; Trans-Am Series	2023 Atlantic Championship is located in the United States
2	R1	Mid-Ohio Sports Car Course, Lexington	April 29	FRP race weekend (F2000, F1600); Formula Vee Challenge Cup	2023 Atlantic Championship is located in the United States
2	R2	Mid-Ohio Sports Car Course, Lexington	April 30	FRP race weekend (F2000, F1600); Formula Vee Challenge Cup	2023 Atlantic Championship is located in the United States
3	R1	(Pennsylvania) Pittsburgh International Race Complex, Wampum	June 10	FRP race weekend (F2000, F1600); Formula Vee Challenge Cup	2023 Atlantic Championship is located in the United States
3	R2	(Pennsylvania) Pittsburgh International Race Complex, Wampum	June 11	FRP race weekend (F2000, F1600); Formula Vee Challenge Cup	2023 Atlantic Championship is located in the United States
4	R1	(Wisconsin) Road America, Elkhart Lake	July 8	Trans-Am Series; FRP race weekend (F2000, F1600)	2023 Atlantic Championship is located in the United States
4	R2	(Wisconsin) Road America, Elkhart Lake	July 9	Trans-Am Series; FRP race weekend (F2000, F1600)	2023 Atlantic Championship is located in the United States
5	R1	(West Virginia) Summit Point Motorsports Park, Summit Point	August 19	SVRA Sprint Series; Formula Vee Challenge Cup	2023 Atlantic Championship is located in the United States
5	R2	(West Virginia) Summit Point Motorsports Park, Summit Point	August 20	SVRA Sprint Series; Formula Vee Challenge Cup	2023 Atlantic Championship is located in the United States

== Race results ==
Round		Circuit	016 Class			Open Class		
Round		Circuit	Pole position	Fastest lap	Winning driver	Pole position	Fastest lap	Winning driver
1	R1	(Georgia (U.S. state)) Road Atlanta	(United States) Tony Ave	(United States) Keith Grant	(United States) Jimmy Simpson	(United States) Austin Hill	(United States) Bob Corliss	(United States) Austin Hill
1	R2	(Georgia (U.S. state)) Road Atlanta		(United States) Jimmy Simpson	(United States) Jimmy Simpson		(United States) Austin Hill	(United States) Austin Hill
2	R1	Mid-Ohio Sports Car Course	(United States) Jimmy Simpson	(United States) Jimmy Simpson	(United States) Jimmy Simpson	(United States) Hayden Bowlsbey	(United States) Hayden Bowlsbey	(United States) Hayden Bowlsbey
2	R2	Mid-Ohio Sports Car Course	(United States) Jimmy Simpson	(United States) Jimmy Simpson	(United States) Jimmy Simpson	(United States) Austin Hill	(United States) Austin Hill	(United States) Hayden Bowlsbey
3	R1	(Pennsylvania) Pittsburgh International Race Complex	(United States) Jimmy Simpson	(United States) Jimmy Simpson	(United States) Jimmy Simpson	(United States) Bob Corliss	(United States) Bob Corliss	(United States) Austin Hill
3	R2	(Pennsylvania) Pittsburgh International Race Complex	(United States) Jimmy Simpson	(United States) Keith Grant	(United States) Keith Grant	(United States) Austin Hill	(United States) Austin Hill	(United States) Austin Hill
4	R1	(Wisconsin) Road America	(United States) Jimmy Simpson	(United States) David Grant	(United States) Jimmy Simpson	(United States) Austin Hill	(United States) Austin Hill	(United States) Austin Hill
4	R2	(Wisconsin) Road America	(United States) David Grant	(Estonia) Tõnis Kasemets	(United States) David Grant	(United States) Bruce Hamilton	(United States) Bruce Hamilton	(United States) Kirk Kindsfater
5	R1	(West Virginia) Summit Point Motorsports Park	(United States) Matthew Butson	(United States) Matthew Butson	(United States) Matthew Butson	(United States) Bruce Hamilton	(United States) Bruce Hamilton	(United States) Bruce Hamilton
5	R2	(West Virginia) Summit Point Motorsports Park	(United States) Matthew Butson	(United States) Matthew Butson	(United States) Matthew Butson	(United States) Bruce Hamilton	(United States) Bruce Hamilton	(United States) Bruce Hamilton

== Season summary ==
The 2023 season of the Atlantic Championship began at Road Atlanta with pole positions for Tony Ave and Austin Hill in the 016 and Open Classes. Ave retired, leaving Jimmy Simpson to defend from a faster Keith Grant, who could not find a way by. Similarly, Bob Corliss was also faster than Hill, but also had to be content with second place. Wright was third in the Open Class and Romer in the 016 Class. Simpson dominated the 016 field in race two, ahead of a photo-finish between Dudley Fleck and Romer. Hill was the only finishing car in the Open Class. Two double wins saw Simpson and Hill head their classes' standings after the weekend.

Rain was once again on the agenda as the field headed to Mid-Ohio. In the 016 class, Simpson established himself as a title contender early on when he took both pole positions and won both races by over ten seconds. Behind him, Fleck and Richard Zober completed the podium both times as only four drivers entered the class. The picture was less clear in the Open Class, as Hill was the only driver to have entered both rounds so far. New entry Hayden Bowlsbey swept race one and fought past Hill to also take the second victory. Both class leaders grew their points advantage in the standings.

The third event was held at Pittsburgh International Race Complex, and familiar faces were on top in qualifying. Simpson swept 016 qualifying while Corliss and Hill shared Open class pole positions. The first race saw Simpson convert his pole position to a win, ahead of David and Keith Grant. Corliss meanwhile had to give up his first place to Hill. Race two was the first race not won by Simpson, as Keith Grant took first place. Simpson still came second, ahead of Romer. Hill was the only Open Class entry to start race two, so he took an unchallenged first place. Simpson and Hill once again extended their points lead.

The fourth round at Road America saw the biggest field of the season, with 15 cars entered. Simpson was still the man to beat, as he took race one pole position and the win ahead of David Grant and Fleck. For Hill, the story was the same, as he also won from pole, leading Kirk Kindsfater and Bruce Hamilton. Simpson handed his car to Tõnis Kasemets for race two. David Grant took pole position and the win, ahead of Kasemets and Keith Grant. Hill had to retire his car, handing Kindsfater the Open Class win, with polesitter Hamilton and Jim Booth completing the podium. Simpson and Hill had now both amassed an unreachable lead in their classes.

Both class champions did not attend the final round at Summit Point. Matthew Butson swept the weekend in the 016 Class, taking both pole positions and wins ahead of Richard Zober, the only two drivers in the class. Zober consolidated his second place in the class, albeit still 82 points behind Simpson. The field was similarly small in the Open Class, with only three cars entered. Hamilton also swept both qualifyings and races in his class, ahead of Everett Stack, while Corliss was unable to start both races. Double-winner Hamilton was therefore able to overtake Corliss for second in the standings, 161 points behind champion Hill.

== Standings ==
=== Scoring system ===
Three points were awarded for pole position in each class, as well as two more points for the fastest lap per race per class.

Position	1st	2nd	3rd	4th	5th	6th	7th	8th	9th	10th	11th	12th	13th	14th	15th	16th	17th	18th	19th	20th	21st	22nd	23rd	24th	25th+
Points	50	42	37	34	31	29	27	25	23	21	19	17	15	13	11	10	9	8	7	6	5	4	3	2	1

=== 016 Class standings ===
Pos	Driver	(Georgia (U.S. state)) ATL		(Ohio) MOH		(Pennsylvania) PIT		(Wisconsin) ROA		(West Virginia) SUM		Pts
Pos	Driver	R1	R2	R1	R2	R1	R2	R1	R2	R1	R2	Pts
1	(United States) Jimmy Simpson	1	1	1	1	1	2	1	DNS			365
2	(United States) Richard Zober	4	5	3	3			5	6	2	2	283
3	(United States) Dudley Fleck	7	2	2	2			3	5			221
4	(United States) Chip Romer	3	3			4	3	4	4			213
5	(United States) Keith Grant	2	4			3	1	Ret	3			205
6	(United States) David Grant					2	Ret	2	1			140
7	(United States) Jim Booth	6	6	4	4							126
8	(United States) Matthew Butson									1	1	110
9	(United States) Christopher Ash	5	Ret			5†	4					96
10	(Estonia) Tõnis Kasemets							DNS	2			44
11	(United States) Peter Ruggiero							6	Ret			30
12	(United States) Tony Ave	Ret	Ret									3
Pos	Driver	R1	R2	R1	R2	R1	R2	R1	R2	R1	R2	Pts
Pos	Driver	(Georgia (U.S. state)) ATL		(Ohio) MOH		(Pennsylvania) PIT		(Wisconsin) ROA		(West Virginia) SUM		Pts

=== Open Class standings ===
Pos	Driver	(Georgia (U.S. state)) ATL		(Ohio) MOH		(Pennsylvania) PIT		(Wisconsin) ROA		(West Virginia) SUM		Pen.	Pts
Pos	Driver	R1	R2	R1	R2	R1	R2	R1	R2	R1	R2	Pen.	Pts
1	(United States) Austin Hill	1	1	2	2	1	1†	1	Ret				355
2	(United States) Bruce Hamilton							3	2	1	1		194
3	(United States) Bob Corliss	2	Ret			2†	DNS	5	4	DNS	DNS		157
4	(United States) Kirk Kindsfater							2	1				92
5	(United States) Hayden Bowlsbey			1	1							12	90
6	(United States) Everett Stack									2	2		84
7	(United States) Jim Booth							4	3				71
8	(United States) Robert Wright	3	DNS					6	DNS				66
9	(Sweden) Oliver Westling			3	Ret								38
—	(United States) Jeffrey Antonelli							DNS	DNS				—
Pos	Driver	R1	R2	R1	R2	R1	R2	R1	R2	R1	R2	Pen.	Pts
Pos	Driver	(Georgia (U.S. state)) ATL		(Ohio) MOH		(Pennsylvania) PIT		(Wisconsin) ROA		(West Virginia) SUM		Pen.	Pts

== See also ==
- 2023 F2000 Championship Series
- 2023 F1600 Championship Series
