= 2023 F2000 Championship Series =

13th season of the F2000 Championship Series

2023 F2000 Championship Series season

Season
- Races: 14
- Start date: March 25
- End date: August 20

Awards
- Drivers' champion: JT Novosielski

The 2023 F2000 Championship Series season was the thirteenth season of the F2000 Championship Series. It was held over fourteen races across seven race weekends. The season began on March 25 at Road Atlanta and finished on August 20 at Summit Point Motorsports Park.

JT Novosielski won the title, ahead of Robert Wright, the only other driver to contest the full season.

== Drivers ==
Team	No.	Driver	Car	Rounds
Hot Dip Racing	00	(United States) Andrew Gable	2002 Van Diemen F2000	4, 7
Auriana Racing	2	(United States) Joe Colasacco	Van Diemen FC	6
JENSEN	4	(United States) Ward Hix	2010 Van Diemen	1
Heritage	3	(United States) Greg Peluso	2003 Van Diemen	2
Citation Engineering	5	(United States) Brandon Dixon	2015 Citation F2000	1
Radon Sports	6	(United States) Matthew McDonough	2010 Radon RN10	5–6
Kevin Kelly Racing	11	(United States) Paul Farmer	2010 Radon RN10	5–6
Tarantula Racing	12	(United States) D.J. Galiffa	2001 Mazda USF 2000	2, 4
Keaton Van Thof Racing	22	(United States) Keaton Van Thof	2003 Van Diemen RF03	3, 6
RMS Motorsports	26	(United States) Rick Silver	1998 Van Diemen RF98	7
Florida RV Sales Motorsport	27	(United States) Hartley MacDonald	2006 Van Diemen RF06	2–6
Red Arrow Racing	32	(United States) Trevor Russell	1999 Van Diemen FC	1, 7
JT Novosielski Racing	33	(United States) JT Novosielski	2012 RFR F2000	All
KK Motorsports	35	(United States) Eric Presbrey	2000 Van Diemen RF03	3
Cordova Motorsports	41	(United States) Glenn Cordova	2004 Van Diemen RF04	2
Cordova Motorsports	41	(United States) Peter Portante	2004 Van Diemen	3
Cordova Motorsports	41	(United States) Theo Peppes	2002 Van Diemen RF02	6–7
Cordova Motorsports	66	(United States) Gabriele Jasper	2004 Van Diemen RF44	2–3, 6–7
LTD Motorsports	45	(United States) Dean Kiriluk	2001 Van Diemen RF01 2	2, 4
Madgame Racing	58	(United States) Mike Pepitone	2000 Van Diemen RF00/01	4, 6–7
Speed Sport Engineering	65	(United States) Michael Varacins	2020 Van Diemen F2000	4–5
Weitzenhof Racing	67	(United States) Dave Weitzenhof	1995 Citation 95SFZ	1–4, 7
Ski Motorsports	81	(United States) Tim Minor	2010 Citation Citation	1, 7
Dole Racing	84	(United States) John Dole	2015 Citation F2000	3, 6
ADSA/Wright racing	90	(United States) Robert Wright	2008 Elan DP08	All
Arrive Drive Motorsports	95	(United States) Nathan Byrd	2008 Elan DP08	2–4
Arrive Drive Motorsports	96	(United States) Dane McMahon	2012 Elan DP08 F2000	2
Tatman Motorsports	122	(United States) Hunter Tatman	2006 Van Diemen RF06	5

== Schedule ==
The schedule was announced on October 12, 2022. The championship did not return to Carolina Motorsport Park, Barber Motorsports Park and Autobahn Country Club. Also, only one round was held at Pittsburgh International Race Complex. Instead, the championship added rounds at Road Atlanta, Lime Rock Park, Road America and New Jersey Motorsports Park.

Round		Circuit	Date	Supporting	Map of circuit locations
1	R1	Road Atlanta, Braselton	March 25	SVRA Sprint Series & Endurance; Trans-Am Series	2023 F2000 Championship Series is located in the United States
1	R2	Road Atlanta, Braselton	March 26	SVRA Sprint Series & Endurance; Trans-Am Series	2023 F2000 Championship Series is located in the United States
2	R1	Mid-Ohio Sports Car Course, Lexington	April 29	FRP race weekend (Atlantic Championship, F1600); Formula Vee Challenge Cup	2023 F2000 Championship Series is located in the United States
2	R2	Mid-Ohio Sports Car Course, Lexington	April 30	FRP race weekend (Atlantic Championship, F1600); Formula Vee Challenge Cup	2023 F2000 Championship Series is located in the United States
3	R1	Lime Rock Park, Lakeville	May 29	Trans Am Memorial Day Classic; SVRA Sprint Series	2023 F2000 Championship Series is located in the United States
3	R2	Lime Rock Park, Lakeville	May 29	Trans Am Memorial Day Classic; SVRA Sprint Series	2023 F2000 Championship Series is located in the United States
4	R1	Pittsburgh International Race Complex, Wampum	June 10	FRP race weekend (Atlantic Championship, F1600); Formula Vee Challenge Cup	2023 F2000 Championship Series is located in the United States
4	R2	Pittsburgh International Race Complex, Wampum	June 11	FRP race weekend (Atlantic Championship, F1600); Formula Vee Challenge Cup	2023 F2000 Championship Series is located in the United States
5	R1	Road America, Elkhart Lake	July 8	Trans-Am Series; FRP race weekend (Atlantic Championship, F1600)	2023 F2000 Championship Series is located in the United States
5	R2	Road America, Elkhart Lake	July 9	Trans-Am Series; FRP race weekend (Atlantic Championship, F1600)	2023 F2000 Championship Series is located in the United States
6	R1	New Jersey Motorsports Park, Millville	July 30	SVRA Sprint Series; Formula Regional Americas Championship	2023 F2000 Championship Series is located in the United States
6	R2	New Jersey Motorsports Park, Millville	July 30	SVRA Sprint Series; Formula Regional Americas Championship	2023 F2000 Championship Series is located in the United States
7	R1	Summit Point Motorsports Park, Summit Point	August 19	SVRA Sprint Series; Formula Vee Challenge Cup	2023 F2000 Championship Series is located in the United States
7	R2	Summit Point Motorsports Park, Summit Point	August 20	SVRA Sprint Series; Formula Vee Challenge Cup	2023 F2000 Championship Series is located in the United States

== Results ==
Round		Circuit	Pole position	Fastest lap	Winning driver	Winning team
1	R1	Road Atlanta	(United States) Trevor Russell	(United States) Tim Minor	(United States) Tim Minor	Ski Motorsports
1	R2	Road Atlanta		(United States) Trevor Russell	(United States) Trevor Russell	Red Arrow Racing
2	R1	Mid-Ohio Sports Car Course	(United States) JT Novosielski	(United States) Nathan Byrd	(United States) JT Novosielski	JT Novosielski Racing
2	R2	Mid-Ohio Sports Car Course	(United States) Nathan Byrd	(United States) Nathan Byrd	(United States) JT Novosielski	JT Novosielski Racing
3	R1	Lime Rock Park	(United States) Peter Portante	(United States) Peter Portante	(United States) Peter Portante	Cordova Motorsports
3	R2	Lime Rock Park		(United States) Peter Portante	(United States) Peter Portante	Cordova Motorsports
4	R1	Pittsburgh International Race Complex	(United States) Nathan Byrd	(United States) Michael Varacins	(United States) Nathan Byrd	Arrive Drive Motorsports
4	R2	Pittsburgh International Race Complex	(United States) Nathan Byrd	(United States) Nathan Byrd	(United States) Nathan Byrd	Arrive Drive Motorsports
5	R1	Road America	(United States) Michael Varacins	(United States) Michael Varacins	(United States) Michael Varacins	Speed Sport Engineering
5	R2	Road America	(United States) Michael Varacins	(United States) Michael Varacins	(United States) Michael Varacins	Speed Sport Engineering
6	R1	New Jersey Motorsports Park	(United States) JT Novosielski	(United States) JT Novosielski	(United States) JT Novosielski	JT Novosielski Racing
6	R2	New Jersey Motorsports Park		(United States) Joe Colasacco	(United States) Joe Colasacco	Auriana Racing
7	R1	Summit Point Motorsports Park	(United States) Tim Minor	(United States) Tim Minor	(United States) Tim Minor	Ski Motorsports
7	R2	Summit Point Motorsports Park	(United States) Tim Minor	(United States) Tim Minor	(United States) Tim Minor	Ski Motorsports

== Standings ==
=== Scoring system ===
Three points were awarded for pole position, as well as two more points for the fastest lap per race.

Position	1st	2nd	3rd	4th	5th	6th	7th	8th	9th	10th	11th	12th	13th	14th	15th	16th	17th	18th	19th	20th	21st	22nd	23rd	24th	25th+
Points	50	42	37	34	31	29	27	25	23	21	19	17	15	13	11	10	9	8	7	6	5	4	3	2	1

Each driver's two worst results were dropped.

=== Drivers' standings ===
Pos	Driver	ATL		MOH		LIM		PIT		ROA		NJM		SUM		Pts
Pos	Driver	R1	R2	R1	R2	R1	R2	R1	R2	R1	R2	R1	R2	R1	R2	Pts
1	(United States) JT Novosielski	4	3	1	1	2	2	5	Ret	3	7	1	2	DSQ	2	492
2	(United States) Robert Wright	6	4	3	6	3	4	7	3	5	4	7	4	3	5	404
3	(United States) Nathan Byrd			2	2	4	3	1	1							270
4	(United States) Hartley MacDonald			8	9	9	9	6	4	8	5	10	9			257
5	(United States) Dave Weitzenhof	5	DNS	6	5	8	6	8	DNS	6	DNS			7	6	255
6	(United States) Gabriele Jasper			4	8	5	5					3	Ret	2	3	238
7	(United States) Michael Varacins							2	2	1	1					196
8	(United States) Tim Minor	1	DNS											1	1	162
9	(United States) Matthew McDonough									2	2	11	3			140
10	(United States) Andrew Gable							3	5					5	7	126
11	(United States) John Dole					10	7					5	5			110
12	(United States) Keaton Van Thof					7	8					6	6			110
13	(United States) Paul Farmer									7	6	8	7			108
14	(United States) Peter Portante					1	1									107
15	(United States) Theo Peppes											4	Ret	4	4	103
16	(United States) Dean Kiriluk			5	4			4	Ret							100
17	(United States) Mike Pepitone							9	6†			9	8	DNS	DNS	100
18	(United States) Joe Colasacco											2	1			94
19	(United States) Trevor Russell	3	1													92
20	(United States) Brandon Dixon	2	2													84
21	(United States) Hunter Tatman									4	3					71
22	(United States) D.J. Galiffa			10	11			10†	Ret							62
23	(United States) Glenn Cordova			9	3											60
24	(United States) Ward Hix	7	5													58
25	(United States) Eric Presbrey					6	10									50
26	(United States) Greg Peluso			7	10											48
27	(United States) Rick Silver													6	DNS	29
28	(United States) Dane McMahon			DNS	7											27
Pos	Driver	R1	R2	R1	R2	R1	R2	R1	R2	R1	R2	R1	R2	R1	R2	Pts
Pos	Driver	ATL		MOH		LIM		PIT		ROA		NJM		SUM		Pts

== See also ==
- 2023 Atlantic Championship
- 2023 F1600 Championship Series
