= Jimmy Simpson (racing driver) =

American racing driver

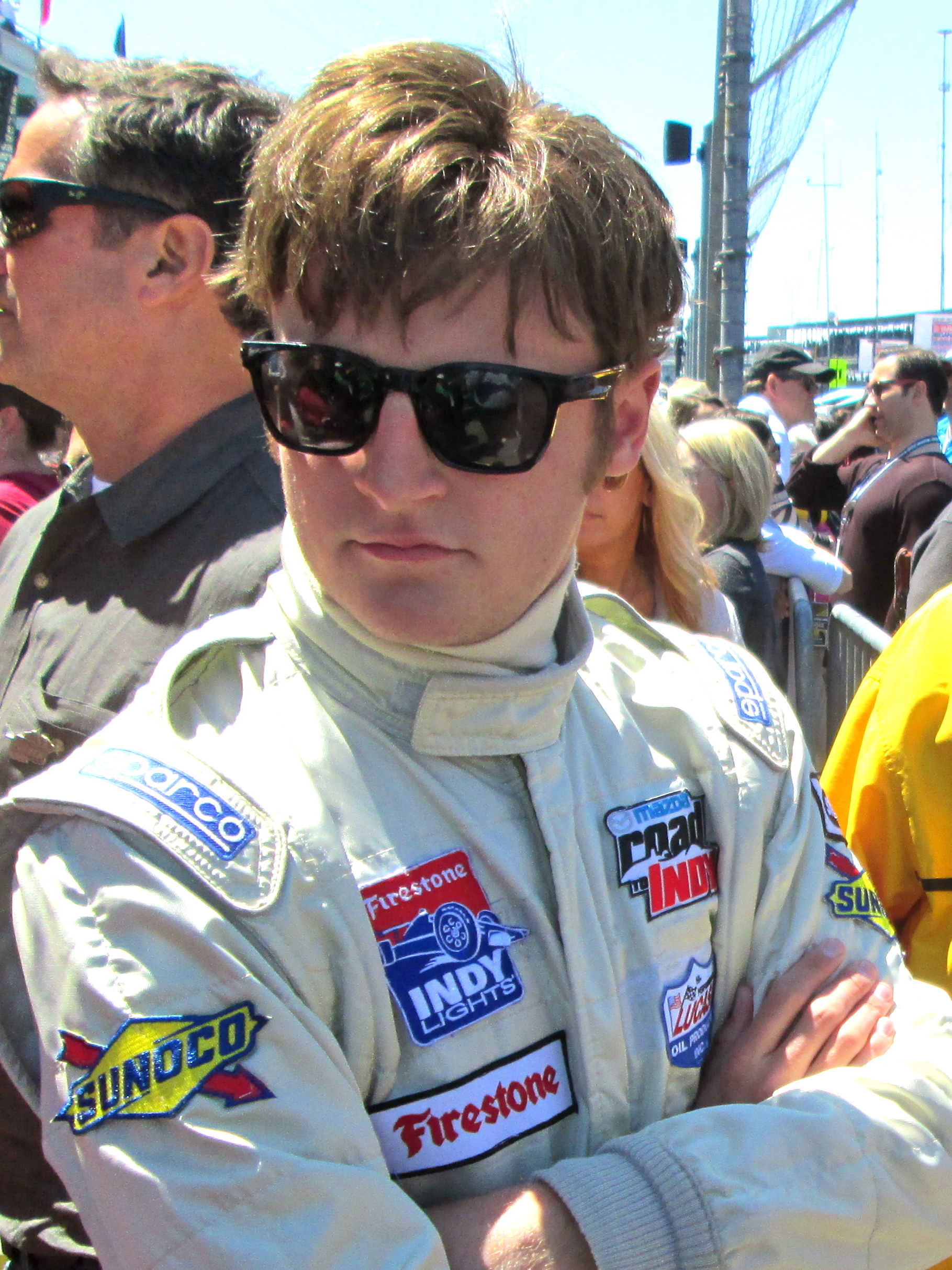
- Simpson at the 2013 Freedom 100
- Nationality: American
- Born: September 13, 1992 (age 34)

Indy Lights
- Years active: 2013–2014
- Teams: Team Moore Racing
- Starts: 3
- Wins: 0
- Poles: 0

Previous series
- 2014, 2023: Atlantic Championship

James Simpson (born September 13, 1992) is an American racing driver from Indianapolis.

== Racing career ==
Simpson began racing with a successful career in karting, including two Kart Racers of America Junior Yamaha championships in 2007 at New Castle Motorsports Park. While at Purdue University, Simpson won the Purdue Grand Prix and became the only driver to do so for four years in a row. Simpson won between 2013 and 2016. Simpson continued his success in karting with a win in 2014, and two runner-up finishes (2008 and 2012), in the RoboPong 200 endurance race at New Castle Motorsports Park in New Castle, Indiana, one of karting's most high-profile events. Simpson also competed in the USAC Midget National Championship from 2010 to 2012, competing in 25 races with multiple heat race wins but never a feature win. In 2009 Simpson finished 2nd in the USAC Ford Focus Midget Championship with multiple feature wins and was named USAC Rookie of the Year in the highly competitive Midwest Division. He also attended Skip Barber Racing School, tested a Formula BMW car, and has on occasion competed in 410 non-wing sprint car racing at Indiana's well known dirt tracks.

In 2013, Simpson began racing in SCCA Formula Atlantic and captured a race victory in his first National Atlantics race at Sebring International Raceway in January. Simpson followed the Sebring victory with a win at the first Formula Atlantic event ever held at Circuit of the America's (COTA) in March 2013, and then wins at St. Louis's Gateway International Raceway in June and Watkins Glen in July. Simpson completed his first Firestone Indy Lights test at the Indianapolis Motor Speedway on May 2 and announced his participation in the Freedom 100 on May 21. He qualified eleventh and finished seventh in the race with Team Moore Racing.

In 2014, Simpson competed full-time in the Atlantic Championship finishing second in the championship with two wins and track records at Watkins Glen and VIR, and also made an appearance in Indy Lights at the Mid-Ohio Sports Car Course double header for Team Moore.

In 2017, Simpson participated in the Kart Racers of America series winning championships in both Tag Senior and 125cc Shifter. He was undefeated in both classes throughout the year. In 2020, he followed up with another Kart Racers of America championship in Tag Senior.

After taking time off to focus on college and his karting business, Simpson had an opportunity to race Formula Atlantic again in 2023. In February, Simpson entered the SCCA Super Tour race at Circuit of the Americas. Simpson raced a Swift 016 prepared by K-Hill Motorsports. He finished with victories both Saturday and Sunday against a field of nineteen Formula Atlantic cars. Simpson continued in March with back to back wins in the Formula Racing Promotions Pro Series in the Formula Atlantic 016 class at Road Atlanta, again running for K-Hill Motorsports. In April, he continued winning with two victories at Mid-Ohio in the Formula Atlantic Pro Series. In June the Pro Series traveled to Pittsburgh International Race Complex where he won on Saturday and placed second on Sunday. In late June, Simpson won the 75th annual SCCA June Sprints at Road America in the Formula Atlantic class. The FRP Atlantic Pro Series was part of the 2023 Road America Speedtour July 7-9th. Simpson clinched the 2023 Pro Series championship with a pole position and win on Saturday.

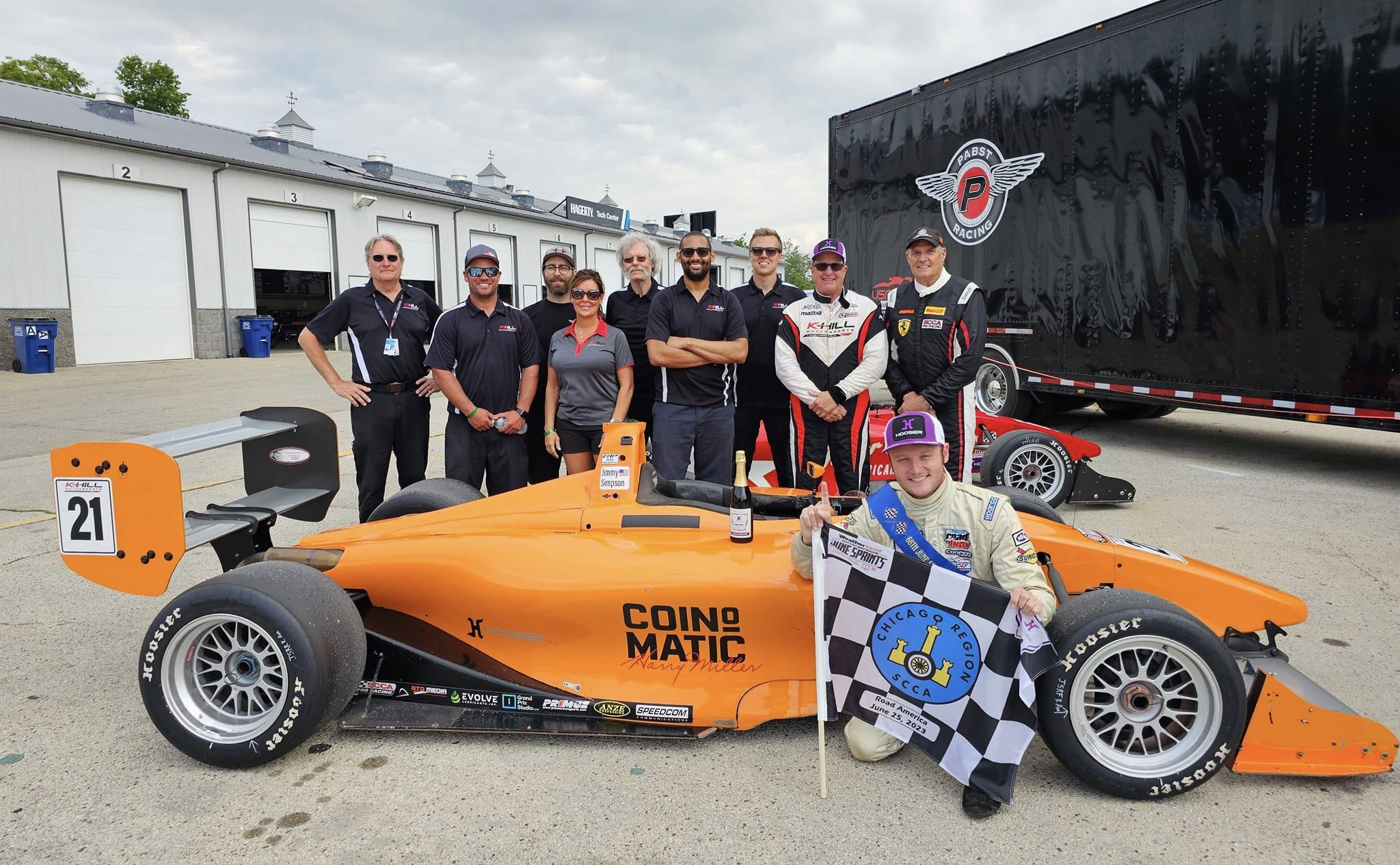

== Personal life ==
Simpson attended Cathedral High School in Indianapolis. He then attended Purdue University and earned his degree. At Purdue Simpson became the only four time (2013, 2014, 2015, and 2016) winner of the Purdue Grand Prix driving for the Electric Vehicle Club (2013) and Delts Racing (2014–2016). He also won numerous evGrand Prix races, including the International Intercollegiate Grand Prix at the Indianapolis Motor Speedway in May 2013 and 2014 for electric race cars with the Purdue team. After graduating in 2016 Simpson won the 2017 alumni Grand Prix.

== Racing record ==
=== Indy Lights ===
Year	Team	1	2	3	4	5	6	7	8	9	10	11	12	13	14	Rank	Points
2013	Team Moore Racing	STP	ALA	LBH	INDY; 7	MIL	IOW	POC	TOR	MOH	BAL	HOU	FON			16th	26
2014	Team Moore Racing	STP	LBH	ALA	ALA	IND	IND	INDY	POC	TOR	MOH; 11	MOH; 8	MIL	SNM	SNM	15th	42

=== Atlantic Championship Series ===
Year	Team	1	2	3	4	5	6	7	8	9	10	Rank	Points
2014	Comprent Motorsports	ATL1; 2	ATL2; 5	WGI1; 6	WGI2; 2	VIR1; 1	VIR2; 2	MOH1; 1	MOH2; 3	TOM1	TOM2	2nd	462
2023	K-Hill Motorsports	ATL1; 1	ATL2; 1	MOH1; 1	MOH2; 1	PIT1; 1	PIT2; 2	ROA1; 1	ROA2; DNS	SUM1	SUM2	1st	365
