= Formula Vee in Australia =

Formula Vee, a low-cost form of open-wheeler circuit racing based on parts from the Volkswagen Beetle, was first raced in Australia in 1965.

In 2004, Australian Formula Vee instituted a switch from the original 1200cc engine to the later 1600cc Beetle engine and gradually introduced other modern components (such as disc brakes) to ensure the continued availability of parts. The resulting cars are similar to Formula First vehicles raced in the US and New Zealand. As of 2024, 1200cc cars are still permitted to run and a separate class result is recorded for the slower 1200cc category.

== Competition ==
As of 2024, Formula Vees are raced in state-based racing series in every Australian state, as well as a single round "National Challenge" and a four-round national series, part of which runs as part of the Hi-Tec Oils Super Series and is televised on SBS Australia.
