= Electric Vehicle Grand Prix =

Electric go-kart race

The Electric Vehicle Grand Prix (stylized as evGrand Prix) is an electric go-kart race held at Purdue University and the Indianapolis Motor Speedway.

== History ==
Purdue University, in conjunction with University of Notre Dame, University of Indianapolis, Ivy Tech Community College, Purdue University Calumet, and Indiana University Northwest, was awarded a $6.1 million grant by the United States Department of Energy. This grant was awarded to create The Indiana Advanced Electric Vehicle Training and Education Consortium (I-AEVtec). The goal of this consortium is to educate and train the workforce needed to design, manufacture, and maintain advanced electric vehicles and the associated infrastructure. This goal includes creating online courses related to batteries, fuel cells, motors, controls, electric vehicles, and environmental impact. As part of this grant, Purdue created an event called the Electric Vehicle Grand Prix. The grant was part of the grants announced by President Obama at a speech in Elkhart, Indiana in August 2009.

== Race ==
The Electric Vehicle Grand Prix is an event at Purdue University that allows students to get real experience with electric vehicles. The first Electric Vehicle Grand Prix was held on April 18, 2010. Students join a team either through a build class or a student-organized team. Each team builds a battery-powered electric go-kart and races it in the event. The 2010 race was an endurance race consisting of 80 laps and a battery change. In 2011, a second event took place at the Indianapolis Motor Speedway where teams would compete in the International evGrand Prix. For the 2013 International evGrand Prix, the event was split up into two races. The first race featured electric karts with standard motors and batteries while the second race featured karts with upgraded motors and batteries. 2013 ended up being the last race at the Purdue Grand Prix track and so that the event could make more money, all further races were moved to Indianapolis, despite the majority of teams coming from Purdue and most teams stating that they still desired an event at Purdue. In 2015 for the first time the race was sanctioned by USAC. In 2016, the evGrand Prix became part of the Student Karting World Finals, along with the High School evGrand Prix and the new National Gas Grand Prix, all of which were sanctioned by USAC. However, the National Gas Grand Prix was canceled after only two teams purchased karts for the race. After the 2015 event the race organizers split with USAC, with the race going forward being sanctioned by the World Karting Association and being run by the staff of the US distributor of Italian kart manufacturer Topkart.

The 2017 event introduced the new high school division to the evGrand Prix, inviting high schools from around Indiana to purchase Topkart chassis and Alltrax/Motenergy powertrains to race before the collegiate event. The 2018 event brought in a new third division, the autonomous evGrand Prix. Only two teams were entered into the inaugural event, one, LHP Engineering Solutions, contracted by the event organizers and the other composed of students from the Electric Vehicle Club (EVC) at Purdue University. In the first year of the division, both teams elected to design the karts to be controlled via remote control. The student-built kart ultimately lapped the track in less than half of the time of the LHP-built kart.

== Education ==
At Purdue there were four classes offered that relate directly to electric vehicles across multiple disciplines, including "Communication and Emerging Technologies" and "Electric Vehicle Systems". However these classes were all cancelled by 2015. Many high school teams have classes involving the electric kart that then enter a kart into the race.

== Winners ==
Purdue University Event Winners
Year	Driver	Team	University
2010	Brett Hensler	Delta Sigma Phi	Purdue University
2011	Justin Cleaver	Team Theablig	Purdue University
2012	Jimmy Simpson	Electric Vehicle Club	Purdue University
2013	Jimmy Simpson	Electric Vehicle Club	Purdue University
2023	Jacob Peddycord	Electric Vehicle Club	Purdue University

Indianapolis Motor Speedway Event Winners
Year	Driver	Team	University	notes
2011	Chris Weyer	IUPUI Electric Jaguars	Indiana University – Purdue University Indianapolis	
2012	Jimmy Simpson	Electric Vehicle Club	Purdue University	
2013	Rob Havel	Delta Sigma Phi	Purdue University	race 1
2013	Jimmy Simpsonr	Electric Vehicle Club	Purdue University	race 2
2014	Chip Challis	Electric Vehicle Club	Purdue University	
2015	Michael Perugini	Cary Racing	Purdue University	
2016	Gabriel Capo	Kennesaw State Electric Vehicle Team	Kennesaw State University	
2017	Henry Davis	Motorsports at Purdue	Purdue University	
2018	Kevin Liu	Electric Vehicle Club	Purdue University	
2019	Alex Aungenstein	Electric Vehicle Club	Purdue University	

== EV vs. Gas Challenge ==
On October 25, 2014, five EV and five gas karts competed on the same track for the first time in Purdue history. The race was scheduled for October 18, but was delayed due to rain. Cary Racing swept the front row with a gas kart on pole, and an EV starting second. The gas karts dominated the race, as eventual winner Eli Salamie leading all 40 laps for Cary Racing. Christian Jones in the #34 PEF kart was the highest finishing EV kart in 4th.

== Interesting History ==
=== 2023 ===
First race since the COVID-19 pandemic, and first race returning to campus since 2013. With a total of 15 karts entering the race, 9 were from Purdue University and 9 were able to complete the race.

=== 2018 ===
First year for the high school event to have two races. The first race was red flagged so that one of the race organizers could scold the inexperienced drivers on their poor driving after a series of crashes.

21 karts entered in collegiate race, 10 coming from Purdue University.

=== 2017 ===
The first race sanction by WKA and first high school race.

Low for collegiate race entries with only 16 karts entered.

First time race ran under WKA standards rather than Purdue Grand Prix standards, including full kart bodywork, no roll cages, and no seat belts or headrests.

=== 2015 ===
The first of two races sanctioned by USAC before leaving in 2016, citing poor race organization by Purdue

=== 2013 ===
Last event at Purdue University

=== 2012 ===
- EVC sets a lap record time of 25.9 s

=== 2011 ===
- The Indiana-only race was on April 30 at Purdue University.
- A week later, on May 7, there will be a race at the Indianapolis Motor Speedway for any school wishing to participate.

=== 2010 ===
- The attendance was over 2000 people.
- 18 karts were signed up for the race, only 17 raced in the event.

== See also ==
- Purdue Grand Prix
