= Purdue Grand Prix =

Go-kart race at Purdue University

- Venue: Grand Prix Track, Northwest Sports Complex, Purdue University
- Location: West Lafayette, IN; 40°26′15.7″N 86°56′38.5″W
- Corporate sponsor: Purdue Grand Prix Foundation
- First race: May 17, 1958
- Last race: April 26, 2025
- Distance: 50 miles
- Laps: 160
- Duration: 1:10:31.054 (Aidan Fox, 2024)
- Most wins (driver): Jimmy Simpson (4)

Circuit information
- Surface: Asphalt
- Length: 0.2698 mi (0.4342 km)
- Turns: 5
- Lap record: 24.616 seconds (Carson J. Bowers, Yamaha KT100, 2026, N/A mph)

The Purdue Grand Prix is a go-kart race that has been held annually by Purdue University in West Lafayette, Indiana, since May 17, 1958. It is known as "the Greatest Spectacle in College Racing." It hosts approximately 3,500 live spectators per year, with many more watching televised or streamed broadcasts. The primary function of the event is to raise money for Purdue student scholarships under the aegis of the Purdue Grand Prix Foundation and its motto: 'Students Helping Students.' Though the race is traditionally held on a Saturday, associated festivities, parties, parades, and other events, both sanctioned and unsanctioned, begin the weekend before and are held throughout the week. Grand Prix is also a large event for alumni who often return to campus for the weekend.

== Details ==
Student organizations, resident hall clubs, co-op houses, and Greek organizations build and race go-karts on a purpose-built course located northwest of the main campus at the block of Cherry Lane, McCormick Road, and US Highway 52. Each kart is required to use a Yamaha KT100 engine and costs approximately $5,000. The event is open to all members of the Purdue student body, including students at other Purdue University System campuses. Students from Indiana University–Purdue University Indianapolis (Note: In 2022 the boards of trustees of both IU and Purdue announced that IUPUI will be split between the institutions by the fall 2024 semester. The School of Engineering and Technology, as well as the Department of Computer Science within the School of Science, will form 'Purdue University in Indianapolis,' a fully integrated extension of the West Lafayette campus. The athletic program and all other academic programs will fall under the new Indiana University Indianapolis.) have won the race on several occasions, possibly due to the motorsports engineering major offered at that campus.

Qualifications are held, weather permitting, on a single day one week before race day. The karts are divided into groups of four and are allowed seven minutes on the track. Each kart's fastest lap is recorded as its qualifying time. The top 27 times are placed in the starting field from fastest to slowest. The remaining six positions are determined by three 15-lap sprint races held prior to the main Grand Prix race. The top two finishers from each sprint race comprise the rest of the 33-kart starting grid. The race is traditionally held on a Saturday; however, due to inclement weather, the race may be postponed to Sunday.

Every five years alumni races are held where former students who participated in the Grand Prix return to race. Karts built prior to 1986 take part in a 15-lap Classic race. Newer karts race in a 35-lap Modern race.

== History ==
The first race was held on May 17, 1958, at the North Intramural Field and adjacent parking lot as a way for engineering students to exercise their skills. It was organized by David Ross and Dan Tubergan. Each cart was built from scratch and was powered by a lawnmower engine. Originally managed by the Purdue Auto Club, the Grand Prix Foundation took over administration of Grand Prix when it was founded in 1965. A purpose-built 3/8-mile track was built near Ross–Ade Stadium in 1968 for $25,000; it was first used in the 1969 Grand Prix.

The 2007 Grand Prix was the 50th-anniversary celebration. David Wolf, a Purdue graduate and astronaut, was the grand marshal for that year's pre-race parade.

The 2008 Grand Prix was the final race held on the "old" track north of Ross–Ade Stadium. This track was demolished due to the Mackey Arena expansion project. The new track, which has been used since 2009, is located at the Northwest Sports Complex. It cost roughly $1 million to build and is modeled after the World Kart Championship Track in Japan.

In 2010 the first Electric Vehicle Grand Prix was held at the Purdue Grand Prix track, following a similar format to its gasoline-powered counterpart. The annual race is usually held at the infield of the Indianapolis Motor Speedway; some years an additional race is held at the Grand Prix Track in West Lafayette. Purdue teams and teams from visiting universities are often allowed to test at Purdue's track on the days in which the gas karts are not practicing. While the EV Grand Prix does not attract as many karts as the Purdue Grand Prix, it has a much more widespread reach, attracting teams from three continents and across the United States.

== Breakfast Club ==
Breakfast Club is a tradition where students and alumni dress in costumes to fill local bars and nightclubs early in the morning. It is best described as a cross between a pep rally, a Halloween party, and a bar crawl. It was started by members of the Theta Chi fraternity in the mid-1980s who wanted to see how early in the morning an establishment could be legally open for drinking. Breakfast Club is also seen the morning of home athletic events, and plays a significant role during the football season. Many participants are dedicated; getting up at 5:00 a.m. on Saturdays and lining up at the bars on Chauncey Hill and the levee by 6:00 a.m. on game days.

== Winners ==
Year	Champion(s)	Team
1958	James Moneyhun Fred Bartlett; Gregory Boman; Ronald Moffett; Kenneth Shull	Gable Courts
1959	Dick Clayton; John Alexander; Robert Elsperman; John Jeffers; Tom Ross	Sigma Chi
1960	John Mullaly	Chauncey House
1961	Tom Ellis	Phi Delta Theta
1962	Jon Mickley; Bert Rosendahl; Bob Whiting; Jerry Williams; Tom Williams	H-1 SE Resident Hall
1963	Edward McDonald	Sigma Phi Epsilon
1964	Robert Booty	Alpha Sigma Phi
1965	Jim Feutsel	Flying Vegetables
1966	George Taylor	The Photon
1967	Al Brittingham	Kappa Delta Rho
1968	Al Brittingham	Kappa Delta Rho
1969	Gary Van der Heide	Sigma Chi
1970	James Fry	Acacia
1971	George Kozak	Wiley
1972	Mike Goodson	Alpha Eta Rho
1973	Charles Workman Jr.	Sigma Phi Epsilon
1974	Wayne Gerhart	Alpha Tau Omega
1975	Mike Brennan	Kappa Sigma
1976	Chuck Sprague	Tarkington
1977	Dave Jones	Beta Theta Pi
1978	Robert Keagy	Sigma Chi
1979	Dave Fleek	Phi Sigma Kappa
1980	Brian Grant	Tarkington
1981	David Fuhrman	FuBaR
1982	John Brenan	Alpha Chi Rho
1983	John Shumaker	Alpha Sigma Phi
1984	Curtis Chariton	
1985	Doug Wright	Pi Kappa Alpha
1986	Bob Pitzer	Cary/Meredith
1987	Dave Skelton	Pi Kappa Phi
1988	Steve Daughtery	Tarkington/Windsor
1989	Tom Smith	FarmHouse Racing
1990	Doug Hodgdon	Alpha Sigma Phi
1991	Doug Hodgdon	Alpha Sigma Phi
1992	Brian Berrisford	
1993	Ian Smith	
1994	Ian Smith	
1995	Ian Smith	
1996	Dustin Smith	
1997	Joe Troyer	Delta Theta Sigma
1998	Kyle Smith	
1999	Tom Gray	Theta Chi
2000	James Weida	
2001	Tom Gray	Theta Chi
2002	Timothy O'Brien	Wiley
2003	Timothy O'Brien	Wiley Hall Excalibur Club Racing No. 2
2004	Clayton Smith	Team Smith
2005	Timothy O'Brien	
2006	Clayton Smith	Team Smith
2007	Liz Lehmann	PMA
2008	Jon Laski	IUPUI Motorsports No. 1
2009	Travis Iles	Sigma Chi
2010	Justin Penix	IUPUI Motorsports No. 1
2011	Justin Penix	IUPUI Motorsports No. 1
2012	Blake Deister	IUPUI MKP Racing
2013	Jimmy Simpson	Electric Vehicle Club
2014	Jimmy Simpson	Delts Racing (Delta Tau Delta fraternity)
2015	Jimmy Simpson	Delts Racing
2016	Jimmy Simpson	Delts Racing
2017	Kyle Tilley	Cary Club Racing No. 1
2018	Jared Thomas	IUPUI Motorsports No. 2
2019	Brenden Johnson	IUPUI Motorsports No. 4
2020	Cancelled due to COVID-19	
2021	Jacob Peddycord	Harrison Hall Cavalier Club Racing
2022	Alexander Kardashian	Jimmy Simpson Racing
2023	Michael Cruz	Cruz Control Racing
2024	Aidan Fox	Kappa Sigma
2025	Raif Shah	Kappa Sigma
2026	Carson Bowers	Excalibur

== Trivia ==
- Ian Smith and Jimmy Simpson are the only drivers to win the Grand Prix in three consecutive years. Smith, Simpson, and Timothy O'Brien are the only drivers to win the race three times. Simpson is the only driver to win the race 4 times.
- The 2016 Purdue Grand Prix showcased one of the closest finishes in the race's history, with four-time champion Jimmy Simpson narrowly defeating Brenden Johnson by just 0.308 seconds after a thrilling, race-long battle. This victory marked Simpson's remarkable achievement of securing a fourth consecutive title at the Purdue Grand Prix.
- Five members of the Smith family (Tom Smith, Ian Smith, Dustin Smith, Kyle Smith, and Clayton Smith) have combined to win eight Grand Prix races.
- Liz Lehmann, the 2007 champion, is the first and only female driver to win as of 2023. The 2007 race was her third try. She finished 4th in 2006 and 3rd in 2008.
- Many IUPUI students have participated in the Purdue Grand Prix. The first entrant was John Steger in 1976.
- Phi Sigma Rho was the first sorority to participate, starting in the 1990s.

== See also ==
- Electric Vehicle Grand Prix
