= Formula Vee =

Race car class

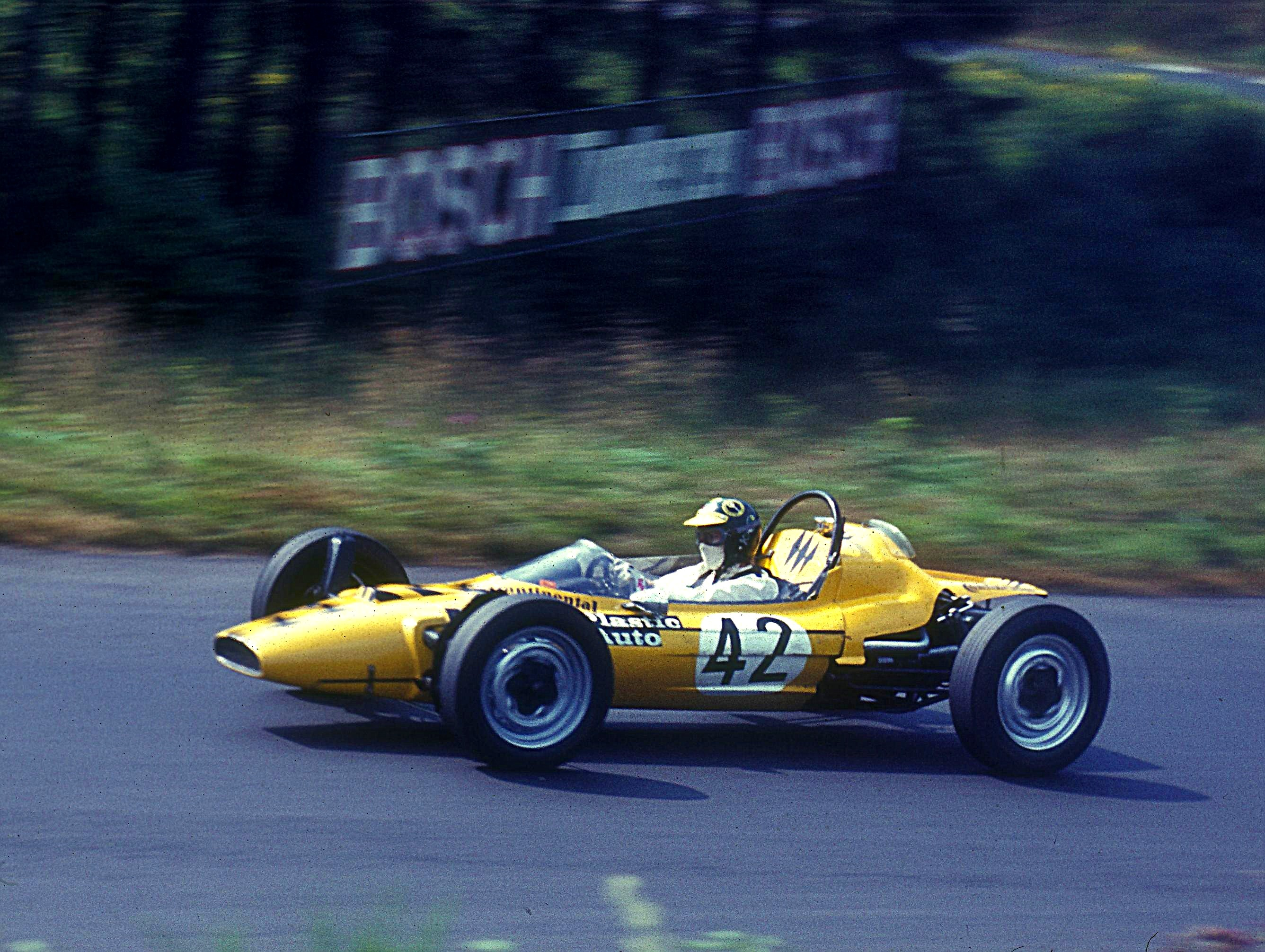
Olympic Formula Vee racing at Nürburgring in 1969

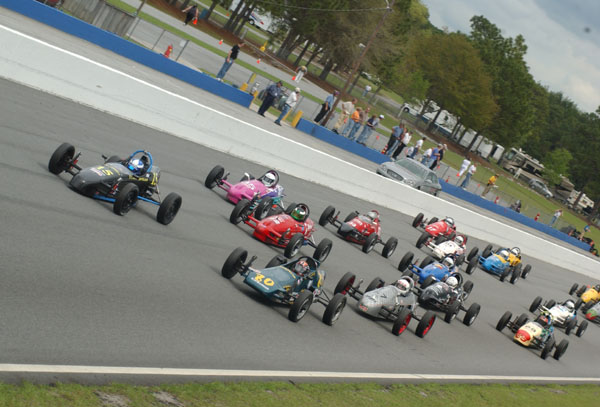
2008 Formula Vee 45th Birthday Party at Roebling Road Raceway

Formula Vee (Formula Fau Vee in Germany) or Formula Volkswagen is an open wheel, single-seater junior motor racing formula, with relatively low costs in comparison to Formula Ford. Formula First, raced in the US and New Zealand, employs the same chassis, but with upgraded motor, brakes and steering. Australia's modern Formula Vee car rules are the definition for Formula First in these countries.

On the international stage, Niki Lauda, Emerson Fittipaldi, Nelson Piquet and Keke Rosberg, all Formula 1 champions, and Scott Dixon, a six-time IndyCar champion, raced Formula Vees in Europe, New Zealand, or America at the beginning of their careers. In Australia, V8 Supercar drivers Larry Perkins, Colin Bond, John Blanchard, John Bowe, Jason Bargwanna and Paul Stokell were also racers in Formula Vee.

== Description ==
The class is based on the pre-1963 Volkswagen Beetle, utilizing a collection of stock parts to form a competitive race car around a purpose-built tube frame and racing tires. The VW engine, transmission, front suspension, brakes, and wheels are stock or modified stock parts. The body is fiberglass or carbon fiber. The intention of this class is for the average person to be able to build and maintain the car.

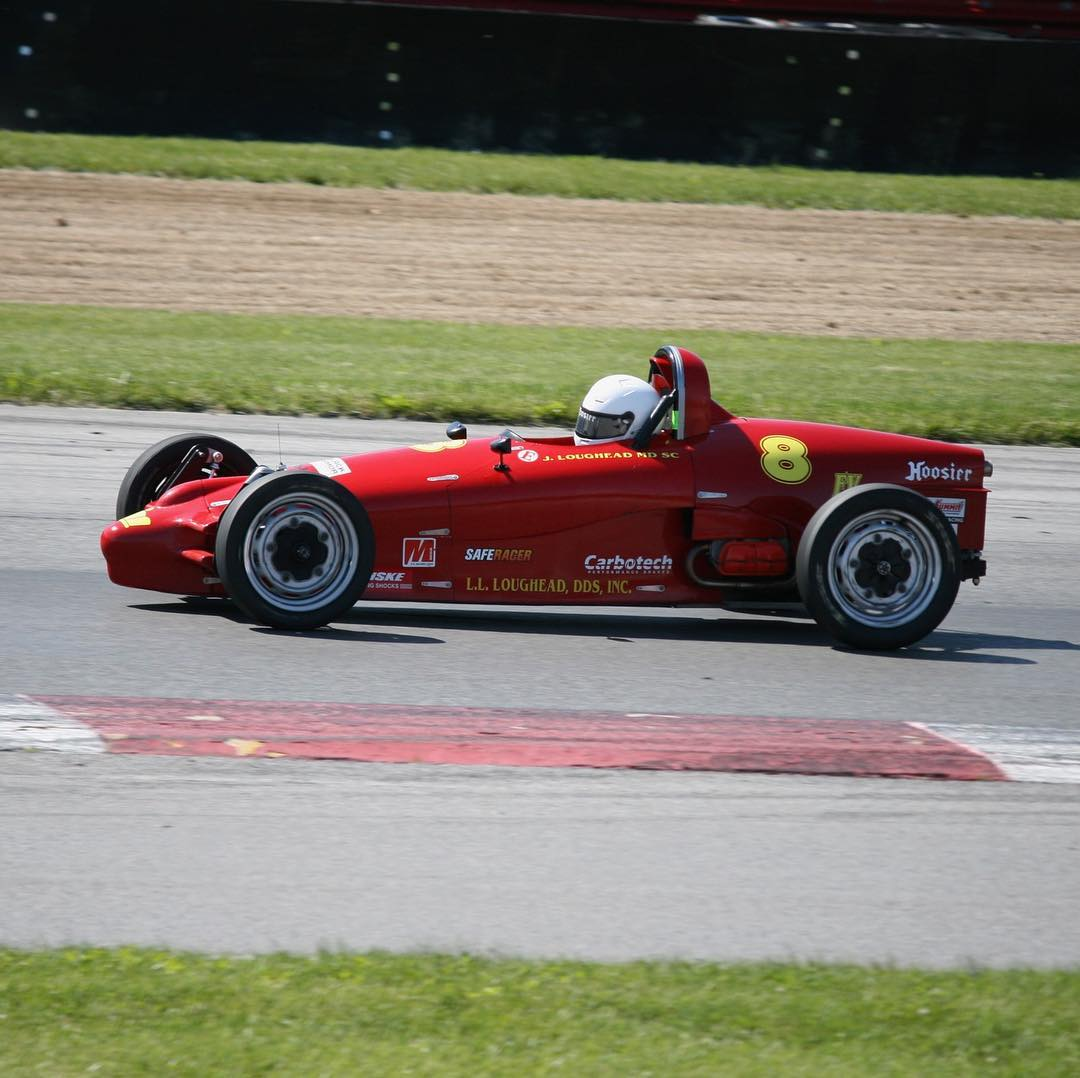
2004 SCCA National Championships Runoffs Winner Jeff Loughead

Over the years, the rules have evolved to improve performance, lower cost, and to allow the replacement of discontinued parts. In 2003, Grassroots Motorsports presented Formula Vee with the Editors' Choice Award. Unlike many open-wheel formulas, Formula Vee cars are not permitted to use wings or ground effect to produce aerodynamic downforce. The lack of these features, the limited engine power, and the similar performance of the cars makes taking advantage of slipstreaming a key tactic.

The engines are based on either the 1200cc or 1600cc variants of the Volkswagen Beetle engine. Unlike many amateur categories, competitors are permitted to build and tune their engines themselves, within strict limitations on the extent of modifications from stock permitted. The 1600cc engines used in the Australian Formula Vee series produce approximately "70-75hp"; the original 1200cc engine produces considerably less. This makes Formula Vee cars among the least powerful vehicles used in circuit racing (for comparison, the contemporary Formula 4 category uses 160 hp engines). A top-running Formula Vee car will go 190 km/h (120 mph) and corner at about 1.6 g. It weighs a minimum of 465 kg (1,025 lb) with driver or 500 kg (1,100 lb) with driver as raced in the Australian 1,600 cc (98 cu in) specification.

Purchasing and running a Formula Vee car is relatively affordable compared to most motorsport categories. In 2022, a brand-new race car for the Australian Formula Vee series was estimated to cost approximately AU$50,000 to AU$55,000 (approximately $US37,000), with competitive second-hand cars costing much less. Renting a car for a race meeting was estimated at $A1000 (approximately $US700). In the US, Formula Vee is one of the classes at the SCCA Runoffs, which awards a national championship. While it is primarily a class in the Sports Car Club of America, many other organizations have adopted Formula Vee as a class.

== Variants ==
Variants of the Formula Vee rules exist in Australia, Brazil, Canada, Germany, the UK, Ireland, South Africa, and New Zealand. Particularly notable is Formula First, racing in the US and New Zealand, which employs the same chassis, but with later model Beetle parts, a larger 1,600 cc (98 cu in) motor (New Zealand uses the 1,200 cc [73 cu in] variant) and other upgraded components such as disc brakes and rack and pinion steering. (Formula Super Vee, although initially similar, soon moved to water-cooled 1.6-litre (98 cu in) VW four-cylinder engines for higher-tech and faster cars).

== List of Formula Vee championships and events ==
Country	Series/Event Name	Active Years	Additional information
Australia	Multiple state-based championships, see Formula Vee in Australia	1965–present	
Canada	Formula 1200 Championship Series	1965–present	
Canada	Challenge Cup Series	2015–present	Also competes in the United States of America.
Canada	Autumn Challenge Cup Series	2013–2014	Also competed in the United States of America. This series became the Challenge Cup Series.
Canada	Pacific Challenge Cup Series	2022–present	Also competes in the United States of America. This series is held on the West Coast of Canada and the USA
(Republic of Ireland) Ireland	Selco.ie National Championship Series	Unknown–present	
Brazil	Campeonato Paulista de Formula Vee	2011–present	
Brazil	Copa ECPA	Unknown–present	
Brazil	Fórmula Vee Open	2021–present	Exclusively for beginners
New Zealand	Formula First New Zealand Championship Series	1967–present	
South Africa	Formula Vee Championship	1966–present	Longest running motor racing championship in South Africa
United Kingdom	Formula Vee Championship Series	1967–present	
United Kingdom	750 Motor Club Formula Vee Championship	1979–present	
United States	Formula Vee at the SCCA National Championship Runoffs	1964–present	Oldest Formula Vee event in the world.
United States	Challenge Cup Series	2015–present	Also competes in Canada.
United States	Driverz Cup Series	2018–present	Hosts challenge series in the Southeastern United States.
United States	Northeast Formula Vee Championship Series	Unknown–present	
United States	Autumn Challenge Cup Series	2013–2014	Also competed in Canada. This series became the Challenge Cup Series.
