= Formula Vee at the SCCA National Championship Runoffs =

SCCA National Championship Runoffs

Formula Vee at the SCCA National Championship Runoffs
- Venue: Road America
- Location: Town of Plymouth, Sheboygan County, at N7390 Highway 67, Elkhart Lake, Wisconsin, United States; 43°47′51″N 87°59′38″W
- First race: 1964
- Most wins (driver): (United States) Michael Varacins (7)
- Most wins (manufacturer): Lynx/Caracal (12)

Circuit information
- Surface: Asphalt
- Length: 6.515 km (4.048 mi)
- Turns: 14
- Lap record: 2:41.594 (Andrew Whitston, Protoform P2, 2023)

Formula Vee is one of the oldest classes in SCCA and competed in the first SCCA National Championship Runoffs.

Formula Vee was first introduced at the Runoffs in 1964 at Riverside International Raceway. The first edition was won by Lewis Kerr. The following decades saw many racing drivers compete in various different racing chassis. Michael Varacins is the most successful driver in the class winning seven times, at five different tracks. Varacins also builds his own chassis.

During the early years of the class the Zink were far superior winning five straight; the chassis won ten total championships. The Lynx chassis name was later changed to Caracal. The Lynx/Caracal chassis has won the most of any other chassis at twelve championships. Later in the class history, the introduction of the Vortech chassis in 2001 started an era of dominance. The chassis type won the race eight consecutive years in a row with three different drivers.

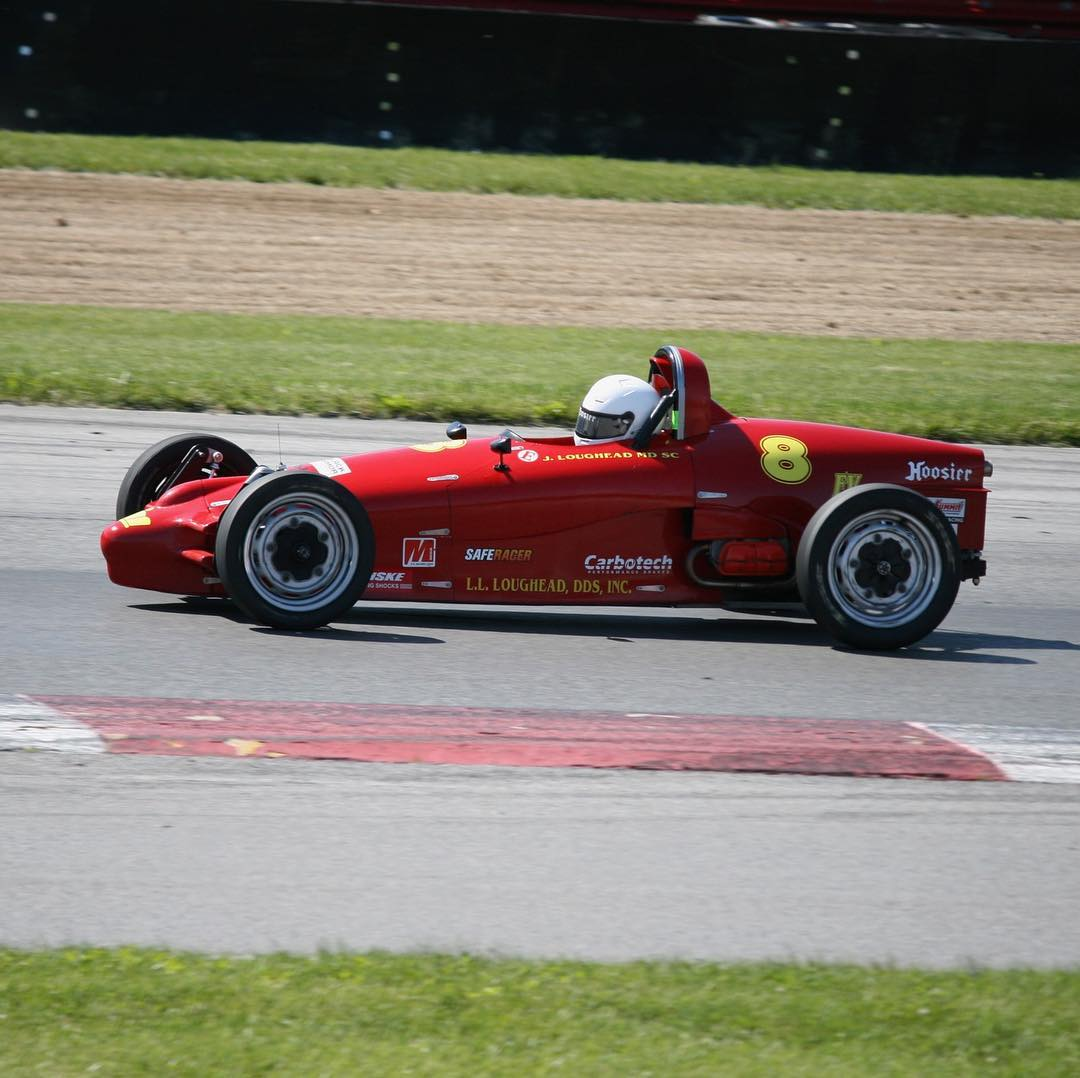
2004 winner Jeff Loughead at Mid-Ohio Sports Car Course

== Race winners ==
Year	Track	Winner	Car
Formula Vee
1964	Riverside International Raceway	(United States) Lewis Kerr	Formcar
1965	Daytona	(United States) Dan Fowler	Beach 5
1966	Riverside International Raceway	(United States) Bill Campbell	Zink
1967	Daytona	(United States) Bill Campbell	Zink
1968	Riverside International Raceway	(United States) Bill Scott	Zink
1969	Daytona	(United States) James Killion	Zink
1970	Road Atlanta	(United States) Harry Ingle	Zink
1971	Road Atlanta	(United States) Garret Van Camp	Lynx
1972	Road Atlanta	(United States) Dave Weitzenhof	Autodynamics
1973	Road Atlanta	(United States) Rollin Butler	Zink
1974	Road Atlanta	(Canada) Harry MacDonald	Lynx
1975	Road Atlanta	(United States) Mike Frangkiser	Lynx B
1976	Road Atlanta	(United States) James Brookshire	Agitator
1977	Road Atlanta	(United States) Mike Frangkiser	Lynx
1978	Road Atlanta	(United States) Don Courtney	Vista Bushwaker
1979	Road Atlanta	(United States) Wayne Moore	Zink
1980	Road Atlanta	(United States) Wayne Moore	Zink Z12.5
1981	Road Atlanta	(United States) Don Courtney	Vista Bushwaker
1982	Road Atlanta	(United States) Bill Noble	Caracal
1983	Road Atlanta	(United States) George Fizell	Zink Z12
1984	Road Atlanta	(United States) George Fizell	Zink Z12
1985	Road Atlanta	(United States) Scott Rubenzer	Citation 85V
1986	Road Atlanta	(United States) George Fizell	Caracal D
1987	Road Atlanta	(United States) Stevan Davis	Racer's Wedge
1988	Road Atlanta	(United States) George Fizell	Caracal D
1989	Road Atlanta	(United States) Bill Noble	Caracal C
1990	Road Atlanta	(United States) Bill Noble	Caracal C
1991	Road Atlanta	(United States) Skip Streets	Mysterian
1992	Road Atlanta	(United States) Stevan Davis	Racer's Wage
1993	Road Atlanta	(United States) Bill Noble	Caracal C
1994	Mid-Ohio	(United States) Bill Noble	Caracal C
1995	Mid-Ohio	(United States) Jon Adams	Adams Aero
1996	Mid-Ohio	(United States) Jaques Lazier	Mysterian M2
1997	Mid-Ohio	(United States) Jonathan Rufener	Caracal D
1998	Mid-Ohio	(United States) Brad Stout	Protoform
1999	Mid-Ohio	(United States) Roger Siebenaler	Mysterian M2
2000	Mid-Ohio	(United States) Roger Siebenaler	Mysterian M2
2001	Mid-Ohio	(United States) Brad Stout	Vortech
2002	Mid-Ohio	(United States) Brad Stout	Vortech
2003	Mid-Ohio	(United States) Stephen Oseth	Vortech
2004	Mid-Ohio	(United States) Jeff Loughead	Vortech
2005	Mid-Ohio	(United States) Brad Stout	Vortech
2006	Heartland Motorsports Park	(United States) Stephen Oseth	Vortech
2007	Heartland Motorsports Park	(United States) Stephen Oseth	Vortech
2008	Heartland Motorsports Park	(United States) Brad Stout	Vortech
2009	Road America	(United States) Michael Varacins	Speed Sport AM-5
2010	Road America	(United States) Rick Shields	VDF
2011	Road America	(United States) Roger Siebenaler	Mysterian M3
2012	Road America	(United States) Michael Varacins	Speed Sport AM-5
2013	Road America	(United States) Michael Varacins	Speed Sport AM-5
2014	Laguna Seca	(United States) Rick Shields	VDF
2015	Daytona	(United States) Michael Varacins	Speed Sport AM-5
2016	Mid-Ohio	(United States) Michael Varacins	Speed Sport AM-5
2017	Indianapolis Motor Speedway	(United States) Michael Varacins	Speed Sport AM-5
2018	Sonoma Raceway	(United States) Michael Varacins	Speed Sport AM-5
2019	Virginia International Raceway	(United States) Andrew Whitston	Protoform P2
2020	Road America	(United States) Chris Jennerjahn	Vortech
2021	Indianapolis Motor Speedway	(United States) Andrew Whitston	Protoform P2
2022	Virginia International Raceway	(United States) Brian Farnham	Silver Bullet FR-S
2023	Virginia International Raceway	(United States) Andrew Whitston	Protoform P2
2024	Road America	(United States) Steve Whitston	Protoform P2
2025	Road America	(United States) Alex Scaler	Scaler Mk1
2026	Road America	(United States) Brian Farnham	Vortech

== See also ==
- Formula Vee
