= Trey Burke (disambiguation) =

Trey Burke is an American professional basketball player.

Trey Burke may also refer to:

- Trey Burke (racing driver), (born 2004), American racing driver

== See also ==
- Troy Bourke
