= DEForce Racing =

American racing team

(United States) DEForce Racing
- Founded: 2016
- Founder(s): David Martínez; Ernesto Martínez
- Base: Angleton, Texas, United States
- Team principal(s): David Martínez; Ernesto Martínez (owner)
- Current series: USF Pro 2000 Championship; USF2000 Championship; USF Juniors
- Current drivers: USF Pro 2000 Championship: (Canada) 7. Mac Clark (Brazil) 9. Nicholas Monteiro (Mexico) 10. Jorge Garciarce; USF2000 Championship: (Brazil) 1. Nicolas Giaffone (Brazil) 10. Lucas Fecury (Australia) 11. Quinn Armstrong (United States) 12. Maxwell Jamieson (United States) 18. Brady Golan; USF Juniors (United States) 15. Jeshua Alianell (Brazil) 16. Bruno Ribeiro (United States) 17. Leandro Juncos (United States) 18. Brady Golan (Mexico) 19. Patricio Gonzalez (Mexico) 20. Rodrigo Gonzalez
- Teams' Championships: USF2000 Championship: 2021; USF Juniors: 2023
- Drivers' Championships: USF2000 Championship: 2021: Kiko Porto; Formula 4 United States Championship: 2021: Noel León; USF Juniors: 2022: Mac Clark; 2023: Nicolas Giaffone
- Website: https://www.deforceracing.com/

DEForce Racing is an American motorsport team that currently competes in the USF Pro 2000 Championship, the USF2000 Championship, and in USF Juniors. The team was founded in 2016 by former Champ Car World Series and IndyCar Series driver David Martínez, and his brother Ernesto Martínez.

== History ==
DEForce Racing was founded in 2016 by brothers David and Ernesto Martínez. The team competes in the USF Pro Championships ladder system in all three series; USF Pro 2000 Championship, USF2000 Championship, and USF Juniors.

== USF Pro 2000 Championship ==
=== 2018 ===
The team made their debut in the then named Pro Mazda Championship in 2018 and fielded two cars with drivers Kory Enders, James Raven, and Moisés de la Vara.

=== 2019 ===
The team returned to the renamed Indy Pro 2000 Championship for the 2019 season, this time running two full-time entries with returnees Kory Enders and Moisés de la Vara. Enders and de la Vara finished 7th and 8th in the championship respectively. Enders would score two podiums at Gateway Motorsports Park and the final race of the season at Laguna Seca.

=== 2020 ===
For 2020, the team expanded to four full-time entries with drivers Kory Enders, Moisés de la Vara, Manuel Sulaimán, and Parker Thompson.

== Current series results ==
=== Pro Mazda Championship / Indy Pro 2000 Championship / USF Pro 2000 Championship ===
Year	Car	Drivers	Races	Wins	Poles	F/Laps	Podiums	D.C.	Pts	T.C.	Pts
2018	Tatuus PM-18	(United States) Kory Enders	2	0	0	0	0	21st	21	8th	58
2018	Tatuus PM-18	(United Kingdom) James Raven	2	0	0	0	0	22nd	17	8th	58
2018	Tatuus PM-18	(Mexico) Moisés de la Vara	5	0	0	0	0	15th	75	8th	58
2019	Tatuus PM-18	(United States) Kory Enders	14	0	0	1	2	7th	211	5th	116
2019	Tatuus PM-18	(Mexico) Moisés de la Vara	16	0	0	0	0	8th	198	5th	116
2020	Tatuus PM-18	(United States) Kory Enders	15	0	0	0	0	10th	164	2nd	325
2020	Tatuus PM-18	(Mexico) Moisés de la Vara	14	0	0	0	0	12th	163	2nd	325
2020	Tatuus PM-18	(Mexico) Manuel Sulaimán	17	2	3	4	4	6th	289	2nd	325
2020	Tatuus PM-18	(Canada) Parker Thompson	17	0	0	0	4	7th	283	2nd	325
2021	Tatuus PM-18	(Australia) Cameron Shields	4	0	0	0	0	15th	43	10th	39
2021	Tatuus PM-18	(United States) Kory Enders	1	0	0	0	0	21st	18	10th	39
2021	Tatuus PM-18	(United States) Nolan Siegel	1	0	0	0	0	18th	21	10th	39
2022	Tatuus IP-22	(Brazil) Kiko Porto	18	1	0	0	3	7th	290	3rd	314
2022	Tatuus IP-22	(United States) Bijoy Garg	4	0	0	0	0	18th	47	3rd	314
2022	Tatuus IP-22	(United States) Nolan Siegel	18	2	2	1	6	4th	333	3rd	314
2023	Tatuus IP-22	(United States) Bijoy Garg	16	0	0	0	1	12th	154	3rd	282
2023	Tatuus IP-22	(Canada) Mac Clark	2	0	1	2	2	23rd	50	3rd	282
2023	Tatuus IP-22	(Mexico) Jorge Garciarce	2	0	0	0	0	27th	17	3rd	282
2023	Tatuus IP-22	(Brazil) Kiko Porto	18	2	2	1	8	2nd	327	3rd	282
2024	Tatuus IP-22	(Mexico) Jorge Garciarce	18	0	0	0	0	10th	199	7th	149
2024	Tatuus IP-22	(Canada) Mac Clark	16	0	0	0	0	11th	187	7th	149
2024	Tatuus IP-22	(Brazil) Nicholas Monteiro	18	0	0	0	0	13th	162	7th	149
2025	Tatuus IP-22	(Brazil) Nicholas Monteiro†	16	0	0	0	0	10th	185	7th	82
2025	Tatuus IP-22	(Mexico) Jorge Garciarce	17	0	0	0	0	14th	148	7th	82
2025	Tatuus IP-22	(Vietnam) Owen Tangavelou‡	8	0	0	0	0	19th	74	7th	82

† Monteiro drove for Turn 3 Motorsport from round 6 onwards.

‡ Tangavelou drove for Velocity Racing Development until round 5.

* Season still in progress.

=== USF2000 Championship ===
Year	Car	Drivers	Races	Wins	Poles	F/Laps	Podiums	D.C.	Pts	T.C.	Pts
2017	Tatuus USF-17	(Mexico) José Sierra	2	0	0	0	0	24th	32	5th	110
2017	Tatuus USF-17	(Mexico) Andrés Gutiérrez	3	0	0	0	0	23rd	35	5th	110
2017	Tatuus USF-17	(United States) Kory Enders	14	0	0	0	0	9th	138	5th	110
2017	Tatuus USF-17	(Mexico) Moisés de la Vara	12	0	0	0	0	12th	98	5th	110
2018	Tatuus USF-17	(United Kingdom) James Raven	3	0	1	1	1	27th	33	3rd	181
2018	Tatuus USF-17	(United States) Zach Holden	5	0	0	0	0	28th	32	3rd	181
2018	Tatuus USF-17	(United States) Kory Enders	14	0	0	0	1	8th	143	3rd	181
2018	Tatuus USF-17	(Mexico) José Sierra	14	0	1	0	2	11th	128	3rd	181
2018	Tatuus USF-17	(United States) Colin Kaminsky	14	0	0	0	0	10th	134	3rd	181
2019	Tatuus USF-17	(Mexico) Manuel Sulaimán	15	0	0	0	2	6th	211	4th	196
2019	Tatuus USF-17	(United States) Jak Crawford	7	0	0	0	0	7th	183	4th	196
2019	Tatuus USF-17	(Brazil) Eduardo Barrichello	4	0	0	0	0	11th	151	4th	196
2020	Tatuus USF-17	(Canada) Nico Christodoulou	5	0	0	0	0	21st	34	4th	210
2020	Tatuus USF-17	(Australia) Cameron Shields	16	0	1	0	2	9th	214	4th	210
2020	Tatuus USF-17	(United States) Josh Sarchet	3	0	0	0	0	25th	14	4th	210
2020	Tatuus USF-17	(Mexico) Gil Molina	2	0	0	0	0	26th	13	4th	210
2021	Tatuus USF-17	(United States) Ely Navarro	18	0	0	0	0	17th	105	1st	440
2021	Tatuus USF-17	(United States) Nolan Siegel	18	1	1	2	4	8th	227	1st	440
2021	Tatuus USF-17	(United States) Prescott Campbell	18	1	0	1	3	10th	215	1st	440
2021	Tatuus USF-17	(Brazil) Kiko Porto	18	4	6	2	10	1st	413	1st	440
2022	Tatuus USF-22	(Canada) Thomas Nepveu	18	0	1	0	3	6th	262	3rd	288
2022	Tatuus USF-22	(United States) Dylan Christie	18	0	0	0	1	11th	188	3rd	288
2022	Tatuus USF-22	(United States) Bijoy Garg	18	0	0	1	2	9th	203	3rd	288
2022	Tatuus USF-22	(Canada) Mac Clark	3	1	0	0	1	22nd	52	3rd	288
2022	Tatuus USF-22	(United States) Chase Gardner	3	0	0	0	0	31st	16	3rd	288
2023	Tatuus USF-22	(Canada) Mac Clark	18	2	2	3	6	5th	318	4th	272
2023	Tatuus USF-22	(Mexico) Jorge Garciarce	18	0	0	0	0	8th	212	4th	272
2023	Tatuus USF-22	(United States) Brady Golan	3	0	0	0	0	28th	21	4th	272
2023	Tatuus USF-22	(Brazil) Lucas Fecury	3	0	0	0	0	30th	19	4th	272
2023	Tatuus USF-22	(United States) Maxwell Jamieson	18	0	0	0	0	16th	121	4th	272
2024	Tatuus USF-22	(Brazil) Nicolas Giaffone	18	0	1	0	3	7th	245	4th	210
2024	Tatuus USF-22	(Australia) Quinn Armstrong	18	0	0	0	0	10th	184	4th	210
2024	Tatuus USF-22	(United States) Brady Golan	18	0	0	0	0	13th	154	4th	210
2024	Tatuus USF-22	(Brazil) Lucas Fecury	18	0	0	0	0	14th	146	4th	210
2024	Tatuus USF-22	(United States) Maxwell Jamieson	18	0	0	0	0	15th	135	4th	210
2025	Tatuus USF-22	(Colombia) Sebastián Garzón	18	0	0	1	1	8th	217	5th	151
2025	Tatuus USF-22	(United States) Jeshua Alianell	18	0	0	0	1	13th	170	5th	151
2025	Tatuus USF-22	(Mexico) Rodrigo González	7	0	0	0	0	19th	61	5th	151
2025	Tatuus USF-22	(Mexico) Patricio González	7	0	0	0	0	20th	56	5th	151
2025	Tatuus USF-22	(United States) Vaughn Mishko	6	0	0	0	0	21st	50	5th	151
2025	Tatuus USF-22	(United States) Brady Golan	5	0	0	0	0	23rd	31	5th	151
2025	Tatuus USF-22	(United States) Thomas Nordquist	2	0	0	0	0	28th	12	5th	151
2026	Tatuus USF-22	(Colombia) Sebastián Garzón	18	4	4	4	11	1st	383	4th	293
2026	Tatuus USF-22	(United States) Thomas Nordquist	18	0	0	0	0	14th	146	4th	293
2026	Tatuus USF-22	(Mexico) Elias Vignola	8	0	0	0	0	21st	48	4th	293
2026	Tatuus USF-22	(United States) Brady Golan	2	0	0	0	0	29th	19	4th	293

* Season still in progress.

== Timeline ==
Current series
USF Pro 2000 Championship	2016, 2018–present
USF2000 Championship	2017–present
USF Juniors	2022–present
Former series
Formula 4 United States Championship	2017–2022
