= Eduardo Barrichello =

Brazilian racing driver (born 2001)

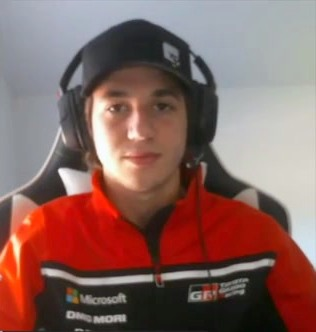
- Barrichello in 2021
- Nationality: (Brazil) Brazilian
- Born: Eduardo Alcide Barrichello; 23 September 2001 (age 25) São Paulo, São Paulo State, Brazil
- Relatives: Rubens Barrichello (father); Fernando Barrichello (brother); Affonso Giaffone (second uncle); Felipe Giaffone (uncle); Nicolas Giaffone (cousin)

FIA World Endurance Championship career
- Debut season: 2025
- Current team: Heart of Racing Team
- Categorisation: FIA Silver
- Car number: 10
- Former teams: Racing Spirit of Léman
- Starts: 14
- Championships: 0
- Wins: 0
- Podiums: 4
- Poles: 3
- Fastest laps: 2
- Best finish: 9th in 2026

Previous series
- 2021–24 2021–22 2019–20 2018: Stock Car Pro Series; FR European Championship; U.S. F2000 National Championship; Formula 4 United States Championship

Eduardo "Dudu" Alcide Barrichello (born 23 September 2001) is a Brazilian racing driver who competes in the FIA World Endurance Championship and IMSA SportsCar Championship with an Aston Martin Vantage AMR GT3 Evo for Heart of Racing Team.

== Early and personal life ==
Eduardo Alcide Barrichello was born in São Paulo on 23 September 2001. He is the son of former Formula One driver Rubens Barrichello and Silvana Giaffone Alcide, a cousin of the racing drivers Affonso and Felipe Giaffone. His brother Fernando is also a racing driver.

== Career ==
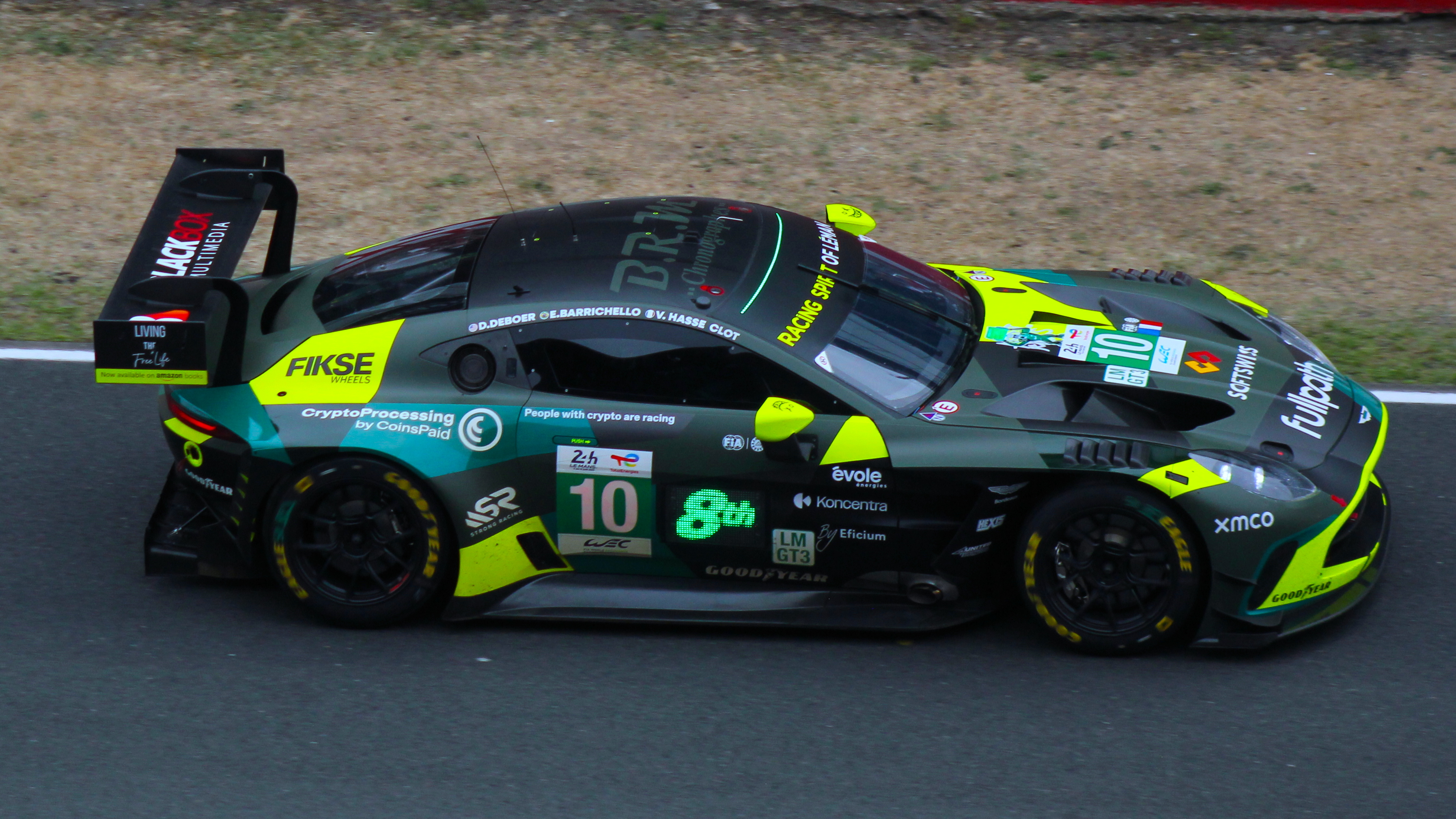
Barrichello's No. 61 car at the 2025 24 Hours of Le Mans

Barrichello made his kart racing debut in 2013 at the age of eleven. In 2018, he started a career in professional motorsport competing in the Formula 4 United States Championship. Barrichello was runner-up in the U.S. F2000 National Championship in the 2020 season. He entered the Formula Regional European Championship in 2021 and 2022.

In 2023, Barrichello competed full-time in the Stock Car Pro Series for Full Time Sports, scoring a win. In 2024, he finished third in points with two wins.

== Karting record ==
=== Karting career summary ===
Season	Series	Team	Position
2014	Florida Winter Tour — AM Engines Rotax Mini Max		45th
2015	Florida Winter Tour — Junior ROK		16th
2016	Florida Winter Tour — Rotax Junior		16th
2017	ROK Cup International Final — Junior ROK		20th
2017	Florida Winter Tour — Rotax Junior		6th
2017	Florida Winter Tour — Junior ROK		4th
2018	Orlando Cup — Shifter ROK Senior		3rd
2018	Florida Winter Tour — Senior ROK		2nd
2018	SKUSA SuperNationals — X30 Senior	NF Piquet Sports	76th
2019	Orlando Cup — Shifter ROK Senior		5th
2019	ROK the Rio — Senior ROK		7th
2019	Florida Winter Tour — Senior ROK	NF Sports	5th
2020	Florida Winter Tour — Shifter ROK	PSL Karting	24th
2022	Rotax Max Challenge Grand Finals — Senior Max	Barrichello Racing	5th
2023	Rotax Max Challenge Winter Trophy — Senior Max		1st
2023	Rotax Max Challenge Grand Finals — Senior Max	Barrichello Racing	41st
2024	Rotax Max Challenge Winter Trophy — Senior Max	PSL Karting	5th

== Racing record ==
=== Racing career summary ===
Season	Series	Team	Races	Wins	Poles	F/Laps	Podiums	Points	Position
2018	Formula 4 United States Championship	DC Autosport with Cape Motorsports	17	0	0	0	0	11	20th
2019	U.S. F2000 National Championship	Miller Vinatieri Motorsports	11	0	0	0	0	151	11th
2019	U.S. F2000 National Championship	DEForce Racing	4	0	0	0	0	151	11th
2019–20	NACAM Formula 4 Championship	Scuderia Martiga EG	2	0	0	0	1	15	19th
2020	U.S. F2000 National Championship	Pabst Racing	17	3	3	2	9	353	**2nd**
2021	Formula Regional European Championship	JD Motorsport	19	0	0	0	0	0	29th
2021	Stock Car Brasil	Full Time Sports	4	0	0	0	0	0	NC†
2022	Formula Regional European Championship	Arden Motorsport	20	0	0	0	1	51	11th
2022	Stock Car Pro Series	Full Time Sports	1	0	0	0	0	0	NC†
2023	Stock Car Pro Series	Mobil Ale	21	1	0	0	1	140	21st
2024	Stock Car Pro Series	Full Time Sports	24	2	0	2	4	868	**3rd**
2025	FIA World Endurance Championship - LMGT3	Racing Spirit of Léman	8	0	2	1	1	32	15th
2025	IMSA SportsCar Championship - GTD	van der Steur Racing	1	0	0	1	0	182	81st
2026	Intercontinental GT Challenge	Heart of Racing by SPS	1	0	0	0	0	0	NC
2026	IMSA SportsCar Championship - GTD	Heart of Racing Team	10	0	3	2	3	2742	**3rd**
2026	FIA World Endurance Championship - LMGT3	Heart of Racing Team	6	0	1	1	3	66	9th
2026–27	Asian Le Mans Series - GT3	Heart of Racing Team							

^{†} As Barrichello was a guest driver, he was ineligible to score points.

=== Complete Formula 4 United States Championship results ===
Year	Team	1	2	3	4	5	6	7	8	9	10	11	12	13	14	15	16	17	Rank	Points
2018	DC Autosport with Cape Motorsports	VIR; 1; 13	VIR; 2; 18	VIR; 3; 21	ROA; 1; 9	ROA; 2; 8	ROA; 3 Ret	MOH; 1; 14	MOH; 2; 14	MOH; 3; 10	PIT; 1; 18	PIT; 2; 14	PIT; 3; 12	NJM; 1; 12	NJM; 2; 8	NJM; 3; 11	COTA; 1; 11	COTA; 2; 11	20th	11

=== Complete U.S. F2000 National Championship results ===
Year	Team	1	2	3	4	5	6	7	8	9	10	11	12	13	14	15	16	17	Rank	Points
2019	Miller Vinatieri Motorsports	STP; 1; 13	STP; 2; 20	IMS; 1; 19	IMS; 2; 5	LOR; 1; 13	ROA; 1; 9	ROA; 2; 7	TOR; 1; 15	TOR; 2; 17	MOH; 1; 14	MOH; 2; 11							11th	151
2019	DEForce Racing												POR; 1; 8	POR; 2; 8	LAG; 1; 6	LAG; 2; 5			11th	151
2020	Pabst Racing	ROA; 1; 3	ROA; 2; 5	**MOH**; **1**; 2	MOH; 2; 11	MOH; 3; 6	LOR; 1; 10	IMS; 1; 1	IMS; 2; 1*	**IMS**; **3**; 5	MOH; 1; 10	MOH; 2; 2	MOH; 3; 7	**NJMP**; **1**; 1*	NJMP; 2; 3	NJMP; 3; 7	STP; 1; 2	STP; 2; 3	2nd	353

=== Complete NACAM Formula 4 Championship results ===
(key) (Races in bold indicate pole position) (Races in italics indicate fastest lap)

Year	Team	1	2	3	4	5	6	7	8	9	10	11	12	13	14	15	16	17	18	19	20	DC	Points
2019–20	Scuderia Martiga EG	AHR; 1; 3	AHR; 2; 14	AGS; 1	AGS; 2	AGS; 3	PUE; 1	PUE; 2	PUE; 3	MER; 1	MER; 2	MER; 3	QUE1; 1	QUE1; 2	QUE1; 3	QUE2; 1	QUE2; 2	QUE2; 3	MTY; 1	MTY; 2	MTY; 3	19th	15

=== Complete Formula Regional European Championship results ===
(key) (Races in bold indicate pole position) (Races in italics indicate fastest lap)

Year	Team	1	2	3	4	5	6	7	8	9	10	11	12	13	14	15	16	17	18	19	20	DC	Points
2021	JD Motorsport	IMO; 1; 20	IMO; 2; 23	CAT; 1 DNS	CAT; 2; 23	MCO; 1 NC	MCO; 2; 16	LEC; 1; 19	LEC; 2; 29	ZAN; 1; 23	ZAN; 2; 19	SPA; 1; 25	SPA; 2; 22	RBR; 1; 24	RBR; 2; 25	VAL; 1; 17	VAL; 2; 26	MUG; 1; 21	MUG; 2; 22	MNZ; 1; 31	MNZ; 2; 17	29th	0
2022	Arden Motorsport	MNZ; 1; 26	MNZ; 2; 20	IMO; 1; 19	IMO; 2; 17	MCO; 1; 11	MCO; 2; 13	LEC; 1; 21	LEC; 2; 15	ZAN; 1; 18	ZAN; 2; 32	HUN; 1 Ret	HUN; 2; 18	SPA; 1; 3	SPA; 2; 5	RBR; 1; 5	RBR; 2; 8	CAT; 1; 6	CAT; 2; 12	MUG; 1; 23	MUG; 2; 23	11th	51

=== Complete Stock Car Pro Series results ===
(key) (Races in bold indicate pole position; results in italics indicate fastest lap)

Year	Team	Car	1	2	3	4	5	6	7	8	9	10	11	12	13	14	15	16	17	18	19	20	21	22	23	24	25	Rank	Points
2021	Full Time Sports	Toyota Corolla	GOI; 1	GOI; 2	INT; 1	INT; 2	VCA; 1	VCA; 2	VCA; 1	VCA; 2	CAS; 1; 19	CAS; 2; 25	CUR; 1	CUR; 2	CUR; 1; 18	CUR; 2; 9	GOI; 1	GOI; 2	GOI; 1	GOI; 2	VCA; 1	VCA; 2	SCZ; 1	SCZ; 2	INT; 1	INT; 2		NC‡	0‡
2022	Full Time Sports	Toyota Corolla	INT; 1 Ret	GOI; 1	GOI; 2	RIO; 1	RIO; 2	VCA; 1	VCA; 2	VEL; 1	VEL; 2	VEL; 1	VEL; 2	INT; 1	INT; 2	VCA; 1	VCA; 2	SCZ; 1	SCZ; 2	GOI; 1	GOI; 2	GOI; 1	GOI; 2	INT; 1	INT; 2			NC‡	0‡
2023	Mobil Ale Full Time	Toyota Corolla	GOI; 1; 15	GOI; 2; 13	INT; 1; 22	INT; 2; 22	TAR; 1 WD	TAR; 2 WD	CAS; 1; 13	CAS; 2; 1	INT; 1; 12	INT; 2; 9	VCA; 1 Ret	VCA; 2 DNS	GOI; 1; 15	GOI; 2 Ret	VEL; 1; 20	VEL; 2 Ret	BUE; 1; 6	BUE; 2; 11	VCA; 1; 27	VCA; 2; 8	CAS; 1; 12	CAS; 2; 11	INT; 1; 17	INT; 2 Ret		21st	140
2024	Mobil Ale Full Time	Toyota Corolla	GOI; 1; 18	GOI; 2; 9	VCA; 1 Ret	VCA; 2 C	INT; 1; 14	INT; 2; 9	CAS; 1; 1	CAS; 2; 10	VCA; 1; 5	VCA; 2; 2	VCA; 3; 10	GOI; 1; 1	GOI; 2; 14	BLH; 1; 4	BLH; 2; 6	VEL; 1; 20†	VEL; 2; 5	BUE; 1; 19	BUE; 2 Ret	URU; 1; 8	URU; 2; 2	GOI; 1; 23	GOI; 2; 11	INT; 1; 7	INT; 2; 6	3rd	868

^{‡} As Barrichello was a guest driver, he was ineligible to score points.

=== Complete FIA World Endurance Championship results ===
(key) (Races in bold indicate pole position; races in italics indicate fastest lap)

Year	Entrant	Class	Car	Engine	1	2	3	4	5	6	7	8	Rank	Points
2025	Racing Spirit of Léman	LMGT3	Aston Martin Vantage AMR GT3 Evo	Aston Martin M177 4.0 L Turbo V8	QAT; 9	IMO; 11	SPA; 6	LMS; 9	**SÃO**; 3	COA; 11	**FUJ**; 17	BHR; 14	15th	32
2026	Heart of Racing Team	LMGT3	Aston Martin Vantage AMR GT3 Evo	Aston Martin M177 4.0 L Turbo V8	IMO	SPA; 13	LMS; 3	SÃO	**COA**; 3	FUJ; Ret	CAT; 9	MNZ; 2	9th	66

=== 24 Hours of Le Mans results ===
Year	Team	Co-Drivers	Car	Class	Laps	Pos.	Class Pos.
2025	(France) Racing Spirit of Léman	(United States) Derek DeBoer (France) Valentin Hasse-Clot	Aston Martin Vantage AMR GT3 Evo	LMGT3	336	45th	13th
2026	(United States) Heart of Racing Team	(United Kingdom) Jonny Adam (United States) Gray Newell	Aston Martin Vantage AMR GT3 Evo	LMGT3	335	35th	**3rd**

=== Complete IMSA SportsCar Championship results ===
(key) (Races in bold indicate pole position) (Races in italics indicate fastest lap)

Year	Team	Class	Make	Engine	1	2	3	4	5	6	7	8	9	10	Pos.	Points
2025	van der Steur Racing	GTD	Aston Martin Vantage AMR GT3 Evo	Aston Martin M177 4.0 L Turbo V8	DAY	SEB	LBH	LGA	WGL	MOS	ELK	VIR	IMS; 15	PET	81st	182
2026	Heart of Racing Team	GTD	Aston Martin Vantage AMR GT3 Evo	Aston Martin M177 4.0 L Turbo V8	**DAY**; 3	**SEB**; 2	LBH; 10	LGA; 2	WGL; 5	**MOS**; 6	ELK; 15	VIR; 4	IMS; 5	PET; 17	3rd	2742
