= Ely Navarro =

American racing driver

- Nationality: (United States) American
- Born: August 4, 2004 (age 22) Las Vegas, Nevada, U.S.

U.S. F2000 National Championship career
- Debut season: 2021
- Current team: DEForce Racing
- Car number: 1
- Starts: 18
- Wins: 0
- Poles: 0
- Fastest laps: 0
- Best finish: 17th in 2021

Elysiah Navarro (born August 4, 2004) is an American racing driver. He currently competes in the U.S. F2000 National Championship with DEForce Racing.

== Career highlights ==
Navarro gained recognition as a karting standout, winning the first-place prize at the Second Annual Lucas Oil School of Racing Scholarship Shootout when he was just 15 years old.

In 2020, Navarro won the Lucas Oil School of Racing Formula Car Series championship.

In the 2021 U.S. F2000 National Championship season, he participated in 18 races but did not secure any wins or poles, finishing 17th overall with a total of 105 points.

== Racing record ==
=== Career summary ===
Season	Series	Team	Races	Wins	Poles	F/Laps	Podiums	Points	Position
2021	U.S. F2000 National Championship	DEForce Racing	18	0	0	0	0	105	17th
2023	F1600 Championship Series	Rice Race Prep	12	1	2	1	3	353	7th

*Season still in progress.

== Motorsports career results ==
=== American open-wheel racing results ===
==== U.S. F2000 National Championship ====
(key) (Races in bold indicate pole position) (Races in italics indicate fastest lap) (Races with * indicate most race laps led)

Year	Team	1	2	3	4	5	6	7	8	9	10	11	12	13	14	15	16	17	18	Rank	Points
2021	DEForce Racing	ALA; 18	ALA; 18	STP; 13	STP; 16	IMS; 15	IMS; 18	IMS; 13	LOR; 14	ROA; 19	ROA; 14	MOH; 19	MOH; 18	MOH; 17	NJMP; 14	NJMP; 8	NJMP; 12	MOH; 13	MOH; 18	17th	105
