= Max Kayser =

Max Kayser may refer to:

- Max Kayser (musician)
- Max Kayser (politician)

== See also ==
- Max Keiser, American-Salvadoran broadcaster and filmmaker
- Max Kaeser, American racing driver
