= Michael Myers (racing driver) =

American racing driver

- Nationality: (United States) American
- Born: December 16, 2001 (age 24) Indianapolis, Indiana, U.S.

U.S. F2000 National Championship career
- Debut season: 2020
- Current team: Michael Myers Racing
- Car number: 42
- Starts: 23
- Wins: 0
- Podiums: 0
- Poles: 0
- Fastest laps: 0
- Best finish: 23rd in 2020

Previous series
- 2019 2019: Lucas Oil Winter Race Series; Lucas Oil Formula Car Race Series

Championship titles
- 2019: Lucas Oil Winter Race Series

Michael Myers (born December 16, 2001) is an American racing driver. He most recently competed in the U.S. F2000 National Championship with Michael Myers Racing in 2021.

== Racing Record ==
=== Career Summary ===
| Season | Series | Team | Races | Wins | Poles | F/Laps | Podiums | Points | Position |
|---|---|---|---|---|---|---|---|---|---|
| 2019 | Lucas Oil Formula Car Race Series | N/A | 18 | 3 | 0 | 2 | 7 | 450 | 2nd |
| 2019 | Lucas Oil Winter Race Series | N/A | 6 | 1 | 0 | 0 | 4 | 185 | 1st |
| 2020 | U.S. F2000 National Championship | Legacy Autosport | 8 | 0 | 0 | 0 | 0 | 29 | 23rd |
| 2021 | U.S. F2000 National Championship | Michael Myers Racing | 15 | 0 | 0 | 0 | 0 | 45 | 26th |

*Season still in progress.

== Motorsports career results ==
=== American open-wheel racing results ===
==== U.S. F2000 National Championship ====
(key) (Races in bold indicate pole position) (Races in italics indicate fastest lap) (Races with * indicate most race laps led)

| Year | Team | 1 | 2 | 3 | 4 | 5 | 6 | 7 | 8 | 9 | 10 | 11 | 12 | 13 | 14 | 15 | 16 | 17 | 18 | Rank | Points |
|---|---|---|---|---|---|---|---|---|---|---|---|---|---|---|---|---|---|---|---|---|---|
| 2021 | **Michael Myers Racing** | ALA; 1 | ALA; 2 | STP; 1; 17 | STP; 2; 22 | IMS; 1; 13 | IMS; 2 DNS | IMS; 3; 11 | LOR; 19 | ROA; 1; 22 | ROA; 2; 21 | MOH; 1; 24 | MOH; 2; 20 | MOH; 3; 12 | NJMP; 1; 21 | NJMP; 2; 23 | NJMP; 3; 21 | MOH; 4; 19 | MOH; 5; 22 | 26th | 45 |
