= Cape Motorsports =

American racing team

(United States) Cape Motorsports
- Founded: 2001
- Founder(s): Dominic Cape; Nicholas Cape
- Base: Brownsburg, Indiana, United States
- Current series: Indy NXT
- Former series: Pro Mazda Championship; USF2000 Championship
- Current drivers: Indy NXT: 20. (Italy) Matteo Nannini; (United States) 21. Nikita Johnson
- Teams' Championships: USF2000 Championship: 2006, 2012–2016, 2020; Formula 4 United States Championship: 2017–18; IMSA Prototype Challenge: 2006
- Drivers' Championships: USF2000 Championship: 2006: J. R. Hildebrand; 2012: Matthew Brabham; 2013: Scott Hargrove; 2014: Florian Latorre; 2015: Nico Jamin; 2016: Anthony Martin; 2017: Oliver Askew; 2018: Kyle Kirkwood; 2019: Braden Eves; 2022: Michael d'Orlando; Formula 4 United States Championship: 2017: Kyle Kirkwood; 2018: Dakota Dickerson; Indy NXT: 2026: Nikita Johnson
- Website: https://www.capemotorsports.com/

Cape Motorsports, currently competing as Cape Motorsports powered by ECR, is an American motorsport team that currently competes in Indy NXT. The team was founded in 2001 by brothers Dominic and Nicholas Cape.

== History ==
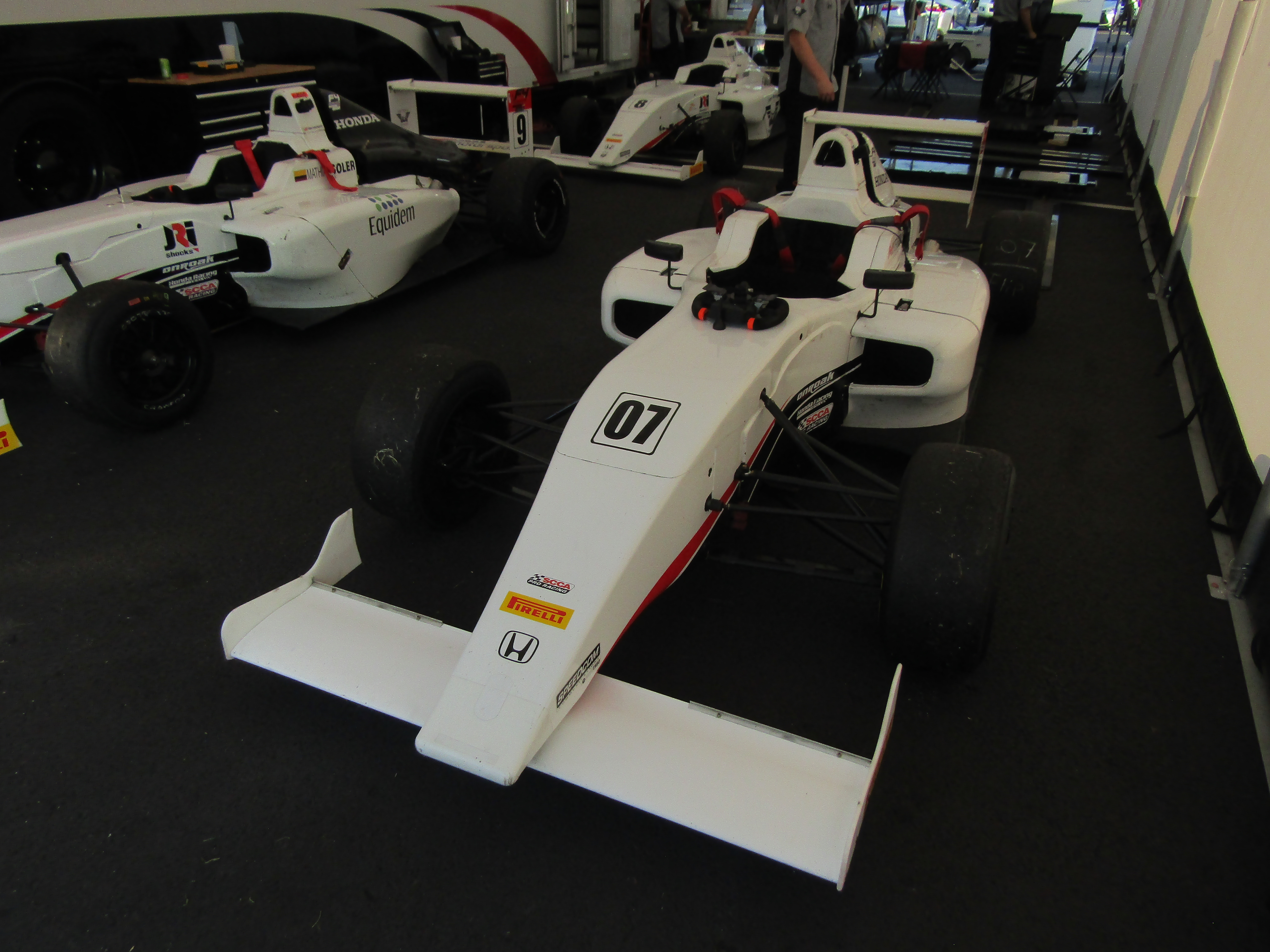
Cape Motorsports F4 cars in the Virginia International Raceway paddock (2017)

Cape Motorsports was founded in 2001 by brothers Dominic and Nicholas Cape. The team competes in the Indy NXT series where they have a technical partnership with IndyCar Series team, Ed Carpenter Racing.

The team has won 14 USF2000 Championships across 16 years with 10 different drivers.

== Current series results ==
=== Indy NXT ===
Year	Car	Drivers	Races	Wins	Poles	F/Laps	Podiums	Points	D.C.	T.C.
2010	Dallara IL-02	(Colombia) Gustavo Yacamán	13	0	0	0	1	293	10th	N/A
2023	Dallara IL-15	(Pakistan) Enaam Ahmed	7	0	0	0	0	150	18th	7th
2023	Dallara IL-15	(Australia) Matthew Brabham †	1	0	0	0	0	159	16th	7th
2023	Dallara IL-15	(Brazil) Kiko Porto	3	0	0	0	0	54	25th	7th
2023	Dallara IL-15	(United States) Jagger Jones	13	0	0	0	1	241	13th	7th
2024	Dallara IL-15	(Mexico) Salvador de Alba	14	0	0	0	2	331	5th	4th
2024	Dallara IL-15	(United States) Michael d'Orlando	7	0	0	0	0	171	18th	4th
2025	Dallara IL-15	(United Kingdom) Sebastian Murray	13	0	0	0	0	230	13th	N/A
2025	Dallara IL-15	(Mexico) Ricardo Escotto	9	0	0	0	0	144	19th	N/A
2025	Dallara IL-15	(United States) Michael d'Orlando	3	0	0	0	0	66	22nd	N/A
2026	Dallara IL-15	(United States) Nikita Johnson	17	2	0	0	9	585	1st	N/A
2026	Dallara IL-15	(Italy) Matteo Nannini	17	2	1	0	2	362	12th	N/A

† Shared results with other teams.

== Former series results ==
=== USF2000 Championship ===
Year	Car	Drivers	Races	Wins	Poles	F/Laps	Podiums	D.C.	Pts	T.C.	Pts
2010	Van Diemen DP08	(Republic of Ireland) Patrick McKenna	12	2	1	1	8	2nd	269	3rd	235
2010	Van Diemen DP08	(United Kingdom) Josh Fielding	3	0	0	0	1	11th	40	3rd	235
2010	Van Diemen DP08	(Chile) Javier Barrales	10	0	0	0	0	7th	112	3rd	235
2011	Van Diemen DP08	(United States) Shannon McIntosh	12	0	0	0	0	8th	101	2nd	259
2011	Van Diemen DP08	(Finland) Petri Suvanto	12	5	4	5	11	1st	328	2nd	259
2011	Van Diemen DP08	(France) Vincent Beltoise	5	0	0	0	0	11th	58	2nd	259
2012	Van Diemen DP08	(United States) Spencer Pigot	14	8	3	4	11	2nd	332	1st	491
2012	Van Diemen DP08	(United States) Trent Hindman	14	0	0	0	2	5th	189	1st	491
2012	Van Diemen DP08	(Norway) Henrik Furuseth (N)	14	0	0	0	0	1st (N)	205 (N)	1st	491
2012	Van Diemen DP08	(Australia) Matthew Brabham	14	4	5	8	11	1st	339	1st	491
2013	Van Diemen DP08	(United States) Neil Alberico	14	6	2	3	8	2nd	277	1st	386
2013	Van Diemen DP08	(United Kingdom) James Fletcher	5	0	0	0	0	27th	24	1st	386
2013	Van Diemen DP08	(Netherlands) Jeroen Slaghekke	10	0	0	0	0	22nd	51	1st	386
2013	Van Diemen DP08	(Canada) Scott Hargrove	14	4	3	5	9	1st	294	1st	386
2013	Van Diemen DP08	(Canada) Steve Bamford	2	0	0	0	0	NC	NC	1st	386
2014	Van Diemen DP08	(United States) Jake Eidson	14	1	0	1	8	3rd	291	1st	372
2014	Van Diemen DP08	(Germany) Keyvan Andres	14	0	0	0	0	16th	114	1st	372
2014	Van Diemen DP08	(France) Florian Latorre †	7	3	3	4	5	1st	310	1st	372
2015	Van Diemen DP08	(France) Nico Jamin	16	10	7	9	15	1st	457	1st	538
2015	Van Diemen DP08	(United States) Aaron Telitz	16	1	0	3	11	3rd	348	1st	538
2016	Van Diemen DP08	(Canada) Parker Thompson	16	4	3	7	12	2nd	374	1st	525
2016	Van Diemen DP08	(Russia) Nikita Lastochkin	15	0	0	0	0	8th	183	1st	525
2016	Van Diemen DP08	(United Kingdom) Jordan Cane	13	0	0	0	1	13th	121	1st	525
2016	Van Diemen DP08	(Australia) Anthony Martin	16	7	9	3	11	1st	394	1st	525
2017	Tatuus USF-17	(United States) Oliver Askew	14	7	8	7	11	1st	351	2nd	277
2017	Tatuus USF-17	(India) Ricky Donison	9	0	0	0	1	15th	75	2nd	277
2018	Tatuus USF-17	(United States) Kyle Kirkwood	14	12	5	6	13	1st	440	2nd	334
2019	Tatuus USF-17	(United States) Darren Keane	15	1	2	5	4	5th	270	2nd	400
2019	Tatuus USF-17	(United States) Reece Gold	15	0	0	0	0	10th	167	2nd	400
2019	Tatuus USF-17	(United States) Jak Crawford	6	0	0	0	0	7th	183	2nd	400
2019	Tatuus USF-17	(United States) Braden Eves	15	6	4	2	8	1st	361	2nd	400
2020	Tatuus USF-17	(United States) Josh Green	17	0	0	0	3	6th	245	1st	457
2020	Tatuus USF-17	(United States) Reece Gold	17	2	1	3	10	3rd	341	1st	457
2020	Tatuus USF-17	(United States) Michael d'Orlando	17	1	0	0	5	4th	295	1st	457
2020	Tatuus USF-17	(United States) Kyle Dupell	17	0	0	0	0	14th	147	1st	457
2021	Tatuus USF-17	(Canada) Thomas Nepveu	18	1	0	0	0	9th	220	3rd	367
2021	Tatuus USF-17	(United States) Evan Stamer	18	0	0	0	0	19th	65	3rd	367
2021	Tatuus USF-17	(United States) Michael d'Orlando	18	3	5	2	8	2nd	365	3rd	367
2021	Tatuus USF-17	(United States) Spike Kohlbecker	18	0	0	0	1	7th	235	3rd	367
2022	Tatuus USF-22	(United States) Jackson Lee	13	0	0	0	0	15th	109	2nd	433
2022	Tatuus USF-22	(United States) Jagger Jones	18	1	3	0	5	4th	294	2nd	433
2022	Tatuus USF-22	(United States) Michael d'Orlando	18	4	5	4	8	1st	387	2nd	433
2022	Tatuus USF-22	(United States) Nicky Hays	18	0	0	0	2	7th	235	2nd	433

(N) - National Class

† Shared results with other teams

=== Pro Mazda Championship ===
Year	Car	Drivers	Races	Wins	Poles	F/Laps	Podiums	Points	D.C.	T.C.
2014	Star Mazda Pro	(Canada) Scott Hargrove	14	3	3	4	10	299	2nd	2nd
2014	Star Mazda Pro	(United States) Neil Alberico	14	0	0	2	4	239	3rd	2nd
2015	Star Mazda Pro	(United States) Neil Alberico	16	4	2	3	8	302	2nd	3rd
2015	Star Mazda Pro	(France) Florian Latorre	16	1	1	1	3	222	8th	3rd
2015	Star Mazda Pro	(Canada) Daniel Burkett	16	0	0	0	1	176	11th	3rd
2016	Star Mazda Pro	(France) Nico Jamin	16	2	1	2	6	331	3rd	3rd
2016	Star Mazda Pro	(United States) Jake Eidson	7	0	0	0	1	106	9th	3rd
2016	Star Mazda Pro	(Mexico) Jorge Cevallos†	6	0	0	0	0	79	10th	3rd
2017	Star Mazda Pro	(Australia) Anthony Martin	12	5	6	4	11	333	2nd	?
2018	Tatuus PM-18	(United States) Oliver Askew	16	1	3	2	5	303	3rd	2nd
2018	Tatuus PM-18	(Russia) Nikita Lastochkin	16	0	0	0	0	209	9th	2nd

† Shared results with other teams

=== Formula 4 United States Championship ===
Year	Car	Drivers	Races	Wins	Poles	F/Laps	Podiums	Points	D.C.	T.C.
2017	Ligier JS F4	(United States) Kyle Kirkwood	20	9	6	10	15	345	1st	1st
2017	Ligier JS F4	(Colombia) Mathias Soler	20	0	0	0	0	88	12th	1st
2017	Ligier JS F4	(Canada) Steve Bamford	20	0	0	0	0	0	33rd	1st
2017	Ligier JS F4	(United States) Jett Noland	3	0	0	0	0	0	37th	1st
2018	Ligier JS F4	(United States) Dakota Dickerson	17	4	2	3	11	269	1st	3rd
2018	Ligier JS F4	(Brazil) Eduardo Barrichello	17	0	0	0	0	11	20th	3rd
2018	Ligier JS F4	(United States) Alex Mayer	5	0	0	0	0	4	24th	3rd
2018	Ligier JS F4	(United States) Robert Allaer	2	0	0	0	0	0	47th	3rd
2019	Ligier JS F4	(United Kingdom) Teddy Wilson	9	1	0	0	1	69	8th	5th
2019	Ligier JS F4	(United States) Nicky Hays	8	0	0	0	2	41	9th	5th
2019	Ligier JS F4	(United States) Reece Gold	5	0	0	0	0	12	18th	5th
2019	Ligier JS F4	(United States) Giano Taurino	3	0	0	0	0	12	19th	5th
2019	Ligier JS F4	(United States) Ryan McElwee	6	0	0	0	0	0	32nd	5th
2019	Ligier JS F4	(Bolivia) Rodrigo Gutiérrez	5	0	0	0	0	0	39th	5th

== Timeline ==
Current series
Indy NXT	2010, 2023–present
Former series
USF2000 Championship	2010–2022
Pro Mazda Championship	2014–2018
Formula 4 United States Championship	2017–2019
