= Grant Palmer (racing driver) =

American racing driver

- Nationality: (United States) American
- Born: February 3, 2001 (age 25) Chicago, Illinois, United States

U.S. F2000 National Championship career
- Debut season: 2021
- Current team: Exclusive Autosport
- Car number: 90
- Starts: 7
- Wins: 0
- Poles: 0
- Fastest laps: 0
- Best finish: 28th in 2021

Previous series
- 2019: Lucas Oil Winter Race Series

Grant Palmer (born February 3, 2001) is an American racing driver. He currently competes in the U.S. F2000 National Championship with Exclusive Autosport.

== Racing record ==
=== Career summary ===
Season	Series	Team	Races	Wins	Poles	F/Laps	Podiums	Points	Position
2019	Lucas Oil Winter Race Series	N/A	3	0	0	0	2	98	5th
2021	U.S. F2000 National Championship	Exclusive Autosport	7	0	0	0	0	38	28th

*Season still in progress.

== Motorsports career results ==
=== American open-wheel racing results ===
==== U.S. F2000 National Championship ====
(key) (Races in bold indicate pole position) (Races in italics indicate fastest lap) (Races with * indicate most race laps led)

Year	Team	1	2	3	4	5	6	7	8	9	10	11	12	13	14	15	16	17	18	Rank	Points
2021	**Exclusive Autosport**	ALA; 14	ALA; 15	STP; 12	STP; 17	IMS; 14	IMS; 17	IMS; 22	LOR	ROA	ROA	MOH	MOH	MOH	NJMP	NJMP	NJMP	MOH	MOH	28th	38
