= Evan Stamer =

American racing driver (born 2001)

- Nationality: (United States) American
- Born: 2001 (age 24–25) Maryville, Illinois, U.S.

U.S. F2000 National Championship career
- Debut season: 2021
- Current team: Ignite Autosport w/ Cape Motorsports
- Car number: 3
- Starts: 18
- Wins: 0
- Poles: 0
- Fastest laps: 0
- Best finish: 19th in 2021

Evan Stamer (born 2001) is an American racing driver. He currently competes in the U.S. F2000 National Championship with Ignite Autosport w/ Cape Motorsports.

== Racing record ==
=== Career summary ===
Season	Series	Team	Races	Wins	Poles	F/Laps	Podiums	Points	Position
2021	U.S. F2000 National Championship	Ignite Autosport w/ Cape Motorsports	18	0	0	0	0	65	19th

*Season still in progress.

== Motorsports career results ==
=== American open-wheel racing results ===
==== U.S. F2000 National Championship ====
(key) (Races in bold indicate pole position) (Races in italics indicate fastest lap) (Races with * indicate most race laps led)

Year	Team	1	2	3	4	5	6	7	8	9	10	11	12	13	14	15	16	17	18	Rank	Points
2021	**Ignite Autosport with Cape Motorsports**	ALA; 19	ALA; 21	STP; 23	STP; 20	IMS; 17	IMS; 23	IMS; 19	LOR; 16	ROA; 18	ROA; 11	MOH; 16	MOH; 15	MOH; 24	NJMP; 18	NJMP; 16	NJMP; 20	MOH; 22	MOH; 11	19th	65
