= Thomas Nepveu =

Canadian racing driver (born 2004)

- Nationality: (Canada) Canadian
- Born: 24 August 2004 (age 22) Oka, Quebec, Canada

U.S. F2000 National Championship career
- Debut season: 2021
- Current team: DEForce Racing
- Car number: 10
- Former teams: Cape Motorsports
- Starts: 33
- Wins: 1
- Podiums: 3
- Poles: 1
- Fastest laps: 0
- Best finish: 9th in 2021

Previous series
- 2020 2019-20: F4 USA Championship; NACAM Formula 4 Championship

Thomas Nepveu (born 24 August 2004) is a Canadian racing driver. He last competed in the NASCAR Canada Series, driving the No. 24 Ford Mustang for Dave Jacombs Racing. He also competes in the Porsche Deluxe Carrera North American Cup. He formerly competed in the U.S. F2000 National Championship with DEForce Racing.

== Career ==
=== U.S. F2000 National Championship ===
In December 2020, it was announced that Nepveu would move to the U.S. F2000 National Championship in 2021 and compete with Cape Motorsports. At the second race at Road America, he took his maiden win by a gap of 0.0679s, holding off Simon Sikes. Nepveu finished ninth at the end of the season.

In December 2021, Nepveu announced that he would switch to 2021 teams' champion DEForce Racing for the 2022 season.

== Racing record ==
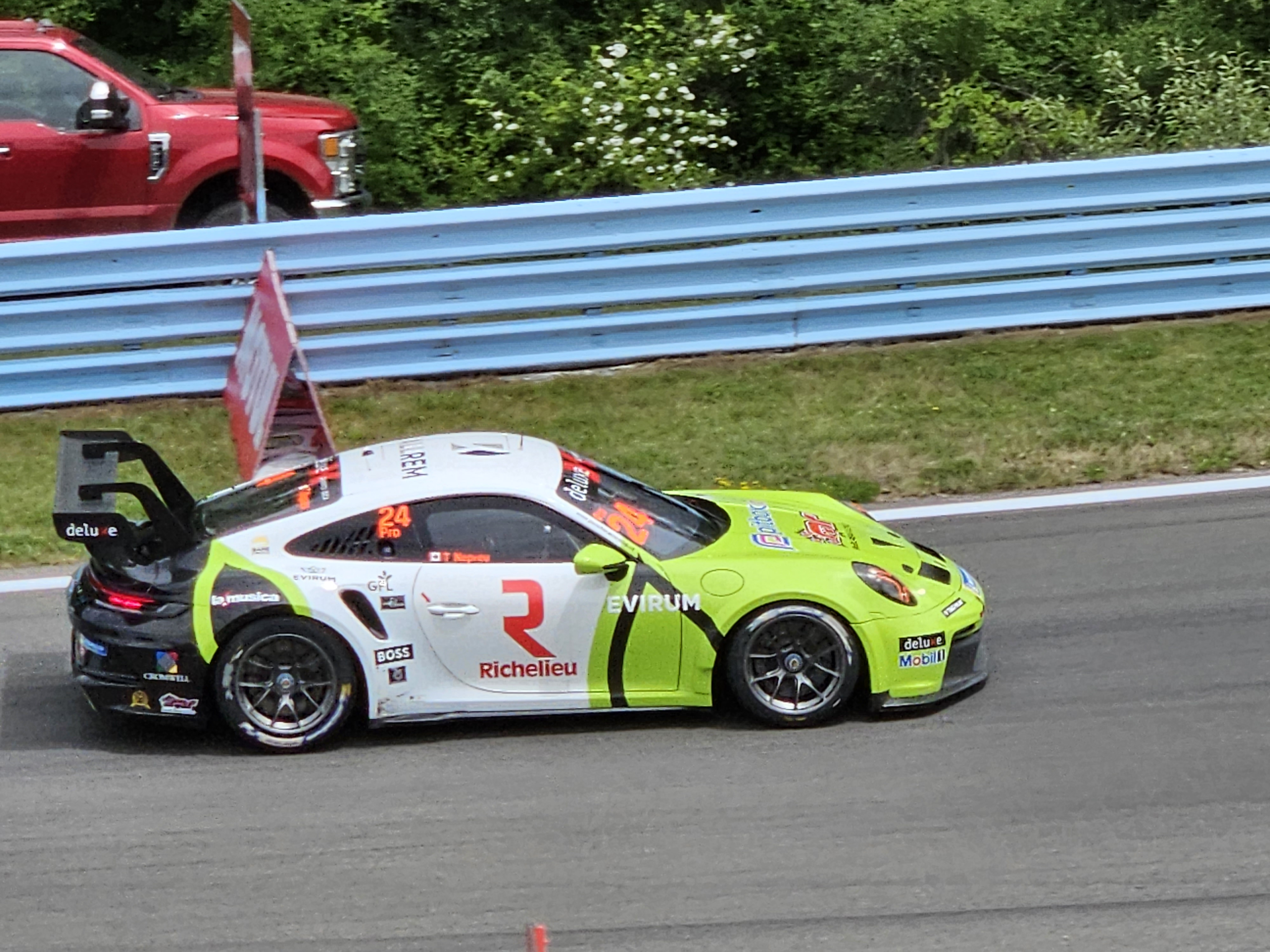
Nepveu competing in a Porsche Carrera Cup race at Watkins Glen International in 2023.

=== Career summary ===
Season	Series	Team	Races	Wins	Poles	F/Laps	Podiums	Points	Position
2019–20	NACAM Formula 4 Championship	Telcel RPL Racing	6	1	0	2	3	66	10th
2020	Formula 4 United States Championship	DEForce Racing	3	0	0	0	0	4	26th
2021	U.S. F2000 National Championship	Cape Motorsports	18	1	0	0	1	220	9th
2022	U.S. F2000 National Championship	DEForce Racing	18	0	1	0	3	262	6th
2023	Porsche Carrera Cup North America	McElrea Racing	8	0	0	0	0	30	18th
2023	NASCAR Pinty's Series	Dave Jacombs Racing	13	0	0	0	0	380	13th
2024	NASCAR Canada Series	Dave Jacombs Racing	10	0	0	0	0	302	10th

* Season still in progress.

=== American open-wheel racing results ===
==== U.S. F2000 National Championship ====
(key) (Races in bold indicate pole position) (Races in italics indicate fastest lap) (Races with * indicate most race laps led)

Year	Team	1	2	3	4	5	6	7	8	9	10	11	12	13	14	15	16	17	18	Rank	Points
2021	Cape Motorsports	ALA; 1; 13	ALA; 2; 8	STP; 1; 11	STP; 2; 7	IMS; 1; 9	IMS; 2; 8	IMS; 3; 5	LOR; 15	ROA; 1; 11	ROA; 2; 1*	MOH; 1; 13	MOH; 2; 5	MOH; 3; 9	NJMP; 1; 16	NJMP; 2; 13	NJMP; 3; 15	MOH; 4; 7	MOH; 5; 8	9th	220
2022	DEForce Racing	**STP**; **1**; 17*	STP; 2; 5	ALA; 1; 6	ALA; 2; 6	IMS; 1; 5	IMS; 2; 16	IMS; 3; 5	IRP; 6	ROA; 1; 5	ROA; 2; 3	MOH; 1; 13	MOH; 2; 12	MOH; 3; 6	TOR; 1; 11	TOR; 2; 2	POR; 1; 3	POR; 2; 9	POR; 3; 14	6th	262

* Season still in progress.
