= Prescott Campbell =

American motorsports engineer and former racing driver (born 2001)

- Nationality: (United States) American
- Born: January 10, 2001 (age 25) Newport Beach, California, U.S.

USF2000 Championship career
- Debut season: 2020
- Current team: DEForce Racing
- Car number: 11
- Starts: 35
- Wins: 1
- Poles: 0
- Fastest laps: 2
- Best finish: 10th in 2021

Previous series
- 2020–21 2019 2018–19: USF2000 Championship; Lucas Oil Winter Race Series; Lucas Oil Formula Car Race Series

Championship titles
- 2019: Lucas Oil Formula Car Race Series

Prescott Campbell (born January 10, 2001) is an American former racing driver and engineer. He last competed in the 2021 USF2000 Championship with DEForce Racing. Campbell is the 2019 Lucas Oil Formula Car Race Series champion.

== Racing career ==
=== USF2000 Championship ===
On February 10, 2020, it was announced that Campbell would move to the USF2000 Championship for 2020 driving for Exclusive Autosport. He would achieve his first podium at the final race at the New Jersey Motorsports Park round. He ended the season 11th in the standings.

Campbell would return to the series for the 2021 season, however, he would switch to DEForce Racing. He would take his maiden win at the second race at Barber Motorsports Park beating teammate Nolan Siegel. Campbell would take three podiums in total to finish tenth in the championship

=== Retirement from racing ===
On February 25, 2022, Campbell announced on social media that he would be retire from professional racing to pursue a career of being a Formula One engineer.

== Post racing career ==
In 2022, Campbell announced that he would join Williams Racing Formula One Team as a structural engineer in August of that year for a 12-month placement with the team.

== Personal life ==
Campbell is a Motorsports Engineering student at Oxford Brookes University in Oxford, England. He is a member of the university's Oxford Brookes Racing.

== Racing record ==
=== Racing career summary ===
Season	Series	Team	Races	Wins	Poles	F/Laps	Podiums	Points	Position
2018	Lucas Oil Formula Car Race Series	N/A	6	1	1	3	1	N/A	15th
2019	Lucas Oil Winter Race Series	N/A	6	3	4	3	3	178	**2nd**
2019	Lucas Oil Formula Car Race Series	N/A	15	3	4	2	11	454	**1st**
2020	USF2000 Championship	Exclusive Autosport	17	0	0	1	1	167	11th
2021	USF2000 Championship	DEForce Racing	18	1	0	1	3	215	10th

=== American open-wheel racing results ===
==== Complete Lucas Oil Formula Car Race Series results ====
(key) (Races in bold indicate pole position) (Races in italics indicate fastest lap)

Year	Team	1	2	3	4	5	6	7	8	9	10	11	12	13	14	15	16	17	18	Pos	Points
2018	N/A	PAL; 1	PAL; 2	ACC; 1	ACC; 2	NOL; 1	NOL; 2	TSM; 1	TSM; 2	NCM; 1	NCM; 2	ROA; 1; 4	ROA; 2; 5	MOH; 1; 4	**MOH**; **2**; 7	SEB; 1; 11	SEB; 2; 1			15th	N/A
2019	N/A	MOH; 1; 2	**MOH**; **2**; 13	MOH; 3; 2	VIR; 1; 3	VIR; 2 DNF	VIR; 3; 1	NJM; 1	NJM; 2	NJM; 3	**NCM**; **1**; 1	NCM; 2; 10	**NCM**; **3**; 2	ROA; 1; 3	ROA; 2 DNF	ROA; 3; 2	**SEB**; **1**; 3	SEB; 2; 1	**SEB**; **3**; 2	1st	424

==== Complete Lucas Oil Winter Race Series results ====
(key) (Races in bold indicate pole position) (Races in italics indicate fastest lap)

Year	Entrant	1	2	3	4	5	6	7	8	9	Rank	Points
2019	N/A	**SEB**; **1**; 1	**SEB**; **2**; 1	**SEB**; **3** DNF	**LGA**; **1** DNF	LGA; 2	LGA; 3 DNF	LGA; 4	**LGA**; **5**; 1	LGA; 6	2nd	178

==== USF2000 Championship ====
(key) (Races in bold indicate pole position) (Races in italics indicate fastest lap) (Races with * indicate most race laps led)

Year	Team	1	2	3	4	5	6	7	8	9	10	11	12	13	14	15	16	17	18	Rank	Points
2020	Exclusive Autosport	ROA; 1; 10	ROA; 2; 12	MOH; 1; 11	MOH; 2; 12	MOH; 3; 18	LOR; 13	IMS; 1; 14	IMS; 2; 16	IMS; 3; 10	MOH; 4; 21	MOH; 5; 10	MOH; 6; 15	NJM; 1; 5	NJM; 2; 11	NJM; 3; 3	STP; 1; 12	STP; 2; 8		11th	167
2021	DEForce Racing	ALA; 1; 2	ALA; 2; 1*	STP; 1; 16	STP; 2; 9	IMS; 1; 22	IMS; 2; 9	IMS; 3; 6	LOR; 2	ROA; 1; 12	ROA; 2; 24	MOH; 1; 27	MOH; 2; 13	MOH; 3; 27	NJMP; 1; 11	NJMP; 2; 6	NJMP; 3; 9	MOH; 1; 21	MOH; 2; 5	10th	215
