= Kiko Porto =

Brazilian racing driver (born 2003)

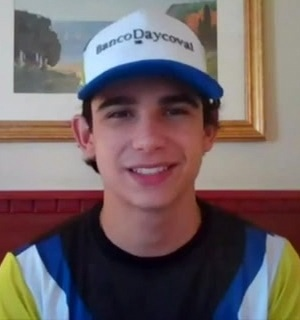
- Porto in 2021
- Nationality: (Brazil) Brazilian
- Born: Francisco Porto; 28 August 2003 (age 23); Recife, Pernambuco, Brazil

Indy NXT career
- Debut season: 2023
- Current team: HMD Motorsports
- Car number: 39
- Starts: 4
- Championships: 0
- Wins: 0
- Podiums: 0
- Poles: 0
- Fastest laps: 0
- Best finish: 25th in 2023

Previous series
- 2022 2020–21 2019 2018 2017–18: Indy Pro 2000 Championship; U.S. F2000 National Championship; Formula 4 US; Fórmula Academy Sudamericana; NACAM Formula 4 Championship

Francisco "Kiko" Porto (Portuguese pronunciation: [fɾɐ̃ˈsis.ku ˈki.ku ˈpoʁ.tu]; born 28 August 2003) is a Brazilian racing driver who competes full-time in the Lamborghini Super Trofeo North America, driving for ANSA Motorsports. He previously competed in the USF Pro 2000 Championship for DEForce Racing. He is the champion of the 2021 U.S. F2000 National Championship.

== Racing record ==
=== Career summary ===
Season	Series	Team	Races	Wins	Poles	F/Laps	Podiums	Points	Position
2017-18	NACAM Formula 4 Championship	Scuderia Martiga EG	6	0	0	1	2	50	9th
2018	Formula Academy Sudamericana	N/A	2	0	0	0	1	25	15th
2018	Formula 4 United States Championship	DEForce Racing	8	0	0	0	0	5	22nd
2019	Formula 4 United States Championship	DEForce Racing	17	3	0	0	8	220	**2nd**
2020	U.S. F2000 National Championship	DEForce Racing	12	1	1	2	4	198	10th
2021	U.S. F2000 National Championship	DEForce Racing	18	4	6	2	10	413	**1st**
2022	Indy Pro 2000 Championship	DEForce Racing	18	1	0	0	3	290	7th
2022	Stock Car Brasil	Scuderia CJ	1	0	0	0	0	0	NC†
2023	USF Pro 2000 Championship	DEForce Racing	18	2	2	1	8	326	**2nd**
2023	Indy NXT	Cape Motorsports	3	0	0	0	0	54	25th
2023	NASCAR Brasil Sprint Race - Pro	Sprint Race	3	1	0	0	1	34	15th
2024	Lamborghini Super Trofeo North America - Pro	ANSA Motorsports							
2024	Indy NXT	HMD Motorsports	1	0	0	0	0	18	26th
2025	IMSA VP Racing SportsCar Challenge - GSX	RAFA Racing Team	12	9	7	8	11	4010	**1st**
2025	Lamborghini Super Trofeo North America - Pro-Am	RAFA Racing Team	4	0	0	0	0	20	16th
2026	Michelin Pilot Challenge - GS	RAFA Racing Team	10	1	1	1	1	1630	14th
2026	Lamborghini Super Trofeo North America - Pro	RAFA Racing Team	6	0	0	0	4	57	10th

* Season still in progress.

=== Complete NACAM Formula 4 Championship results ===
(key) (Races in bold indicate pole position) (Races in italics indicate fastest lap)

Year	Entrant	1	2	3	4	5	6	7	8	9	10	11	12	13	14	15	16	17	18	19	20	21	22	DC	Points
2017–18	Scuderia Martiga EG	AHR1; 1	AHR1; 2	AHR2; 1	AHR2; 2	EDM; 1	EDM; 2	EDM; 3	PUE; 1	PUE; 2	PUE; 3	AGS; 1	AGS; 2	AGS; 3	MER; 1	MER; 2	MER; 3	MTY; 1 Ret	MTY; 2; 5	MTY; 3; 8	AHR3; 1 Ret	AHR3; 2; 2	AHR3; 3; 2	9th	50

=== Complete Formula 4 United States Championship results ===
(key) (Races in bold indicate pole position) (Races in italics indicate fastest lap)

Year	Entrant	1	2	3	4	5	6	7	8	9	10	11	12	13	14	15	16	17	DC	Points
2018	DEForce Racing	VIR; 1	VIR; 2	VIR; 3	ROA; 1	ROA; 2	ROA; 3	MOH; 1	MOH; 2	MOH; 3	PIT; 1; 10	PIT; 2; 15	PIT; 3; 10	NJMP; 1; 10	NJMP; 2; 10	NJMP; 3; 22	COTA; 1; 13	COTA; 2; 10	22nd	5
2019	DEForce Racing	ATL; 1; 2	ATL; 2; 1	ATL; 3; 3	PIT; 1; 4	PIT; 2; 1	PIT; 3; 4	VIR; 1; 3	VIR; 2; 4	VIR; 3; 11	MOH; 1; 1	MOH; 2; 9	MOH; 3; 5	SEB; 1; 3	SEB; 2; 7	SEB; 3; 2	COA; 1 Ret	COA; 2; 5	2nd	220

=== American open–wheel racing results ===
==== U.S. F2000 National Championship ====
Year	Team	1	2	3	4	5	6	7	8	9	10	11	12	13	14	15	16	17	18	Rank	Points
2020	DEForce Racing	ROA; 1	ROA; 2	MOH; 1; 8	MOH; 2; 18	MOH; 3; 11	LOR; 14	**IMS**; **1**; 3*	**IMS**; **2**; 4	IMS; 3; 3	MOH; 1; 7	MOH; 2; 8	MOH; 3; 11	NJM; 1	NJM; 2	NJM; 3	STP; 1; 1	STP; 2; 2		10th	198
2021	DEForce Racing	ALA; 1; 10	ALA; 2; 4	STP; 1; 5	**STP**; **2**; 2	IMS; 1; 7	IMS; 2; 3	IMS; 3; 1	LOR; 4	**ROA**; **1**; 1	**ROA**; **2**; 5	**MOH**; **1**; 2	**MOH**; **2**; 1	**MOH**; **3**; 5	NJM; 1; 1	NJM; 3; 2	NJM; 4; 8	MOH; 4; 3	MOH; 5; 3	1st	413

==== Indy / USF Pro 2000 Championship ====
Year	Team	1	2	3	4	5	6	7	8	9	10	11	12	13	14	15	16	17	18	Rank	Points
2022	DEForce Racing	STP; 1; 6	STP; 2; 4	ALA; 1; 8	ALA; 2; 7	IMS; 1; 6	IMS; 2; 4	IMS; 3; 8	IRP; 7	ROA; 1; 14	ROA; 2; 12	MOH; 1; 4	MOH; 2; 1*	TOR; 1; 9	TOR; 2; 6	GMP; 11	POR; 1; 15	POR; 2; 3	POR; 3; 2	7th	290
2023	DEForce Racing	STP; 1; 2	STP; 2; 2	SEB; 1; 19	SEB; 2; 3	**IMS**; **1**; 7*	IMS; 2; 11	IRP; 10	ROA; 1; 5	ROA; 2; 2	MOH; 1; 19	MOH; 2; 2	TOR; 1; 5	TOR; 2; 7	COTA; 1; 1*	**COTA**; **1**; 2	POR; 1; 1*	POR; 2; 5	POR; 3; 17	2nd	326

==== Indy NXT ====
Year	Team	1	2	3	4	5	6	7	8	9	10	11	12	13	14	Rank	Points
2023	Cape Motorsports	STP	BAR	IMS	DET	DET	RDA	MOH	IOW	NSH	IMS; 9	GMP	POR	LAG; 17	LAG; 11	25th	54
2024	HMD Motorsports	STP	BAR	IMS	IMS	DET	RDA; 12	LGA	LGA	MOH	IOW	GMP	POR	MIL	NSH	26th	18

Sporting positions
Preceded by Christian Rasmussen	U.S. F2000 National Championship; Champion; 2021	Succeeded by Michael d'Orlando
