= 2020 U.S. F2000 National Championship =

Racing season

The 2020 U.S. F2000 National Championship was the eleventh season of the U.S. F2000 National Championship since its revival in 2010. The championship serves as the first rung of the IndyCar Series's Road to Indy ladder system. An 18 race schedule was announced on 12 September 2019 featuring six permanent road courses, two street circuits, and a single oval in the Dave Steele Classic. The Dave Steele Classic race is a standalone race, while the Indianapolis road course race is now a stand-alone round due to the NASCAR Cup Series Big Machine Vodka 400 and GMR Grand Prix is a doubleheader weekend so it is full.

Danish driver Christian Rasmussen, driving for Jay Howard Driver Development, dominated the year, winning over half of all races and clinching the championship title at New Jersey Motorsports Park, two races before the end of the season

== Drivers and teams ==
Competitors entered for the March round at St. Petersburg took part in a practice session prior to the cancellation, and are marked with a C.

Team	No.	Driver(s)	Status	Round(s)
Cape Motorsports	2	(United States) Josh Green	R	C, All
Cape Motorsports	3	(United States) Reece Gold		C, All
Cape Motorsports	4	(United States) Michael d'Orlando		C, All
Cape Motorsports	8	(United States) Kyle Dupell		C, All
DEForce Racing	10	(United States) Mathias Ramirez	R	C
DEForce Racing	10	(Canada) Nico Christodoulou	R	1–2
DEForce Racing	10	(Australia) Cameron Shields		7–17
DEForce Racing	11	(United States) Josh Sarchet	R	10–12
DEForce Racing	11	(Canada) Nico Christodoulou	R	13–15
DEForce Racing	11	(Mexico) Gil Molina	R	16–17
DEForce Racing	12	(Brazil) Kiko Porto	R	C, 3–12, 16–17
Exclusive Autosport	1	(United States) Prescott Campbell	R	C, All
Exclusive Autosport	16	(United States) Josh Pierson	R	All
Exclusive Autosport	44	(United States) Christian Brooks	R	C, All
Exclusive Autosport	91	(Mexico) Manuel Cabrera		C
Jay Howard Driver Development	5	(United States) Wyatt Brichacek	R	C, All
Jay Howard Driver Development	6	(Denmark) Christian Rasmussen		C, All
Jay Howard Driver Development	7	(United States) Christian Bogle		C, All
Jay Howard Driver Development	9	(United States) Nolan Siegel		C, All
Jay Howard Driver Development	18	(United States) Bijoy Garg	R	1–9, 16–17
Legacy Autosport	20	(Australia) Cameron Shields		C, 1–6
Legacy Autosport	20	(United States) Simon Sikes	R	7–12, 16–17
Legacy Autosport	24	(United States) Michael Myers	R	7–12, 16–17
Legacy Autosport	27	(United States) Ayrton Ori	R	C, 1–5
Miller Vinatieri Motorsports	40	(United States) Jack William Miller		C, All
Miller Vinatieri Motorsports	41	(United States) Max Kaeser	R	C, 1–12
Miller Vinatieri Motorsports	41	(United States) Kent Vaccaro	R	13–15
Newman Wachs Racing	38	(United States) Jordan Missig	R	C
Pabst Racing	21	(United States) Yuven Sundaramoorthy		C, All
Pabst Racing	22	(Brazil) Eduardo Barrichello		C, All
Pabst Racing	23	(United Kingdom) Matthew Round-Garrido		C, All

Icon	Class
R	Rookie

== Schedule ==
Rd.	Date	Race name	Track	Location
1	July 9–10	USF2000 Grand Prix of Road America; Presented by Cooper Tires Honoring First Responders	R Road America	Elkhart Lake, Wisconsin
2	July 9–10	USF2000 Grand Prix of Road America; Presented by Cooper Tires Honoring First Responders	R Road America	Elkhart Lake, Wisconsin
3	July 29–30	USF2000 Championship Grand Prix of Mid-Ohio; Presented by Cooper Tires Honoring First Responders	R Mid-Ohio Sports Car Course	Lexington, Ohio
4	July 29–30	USF2000 Championship Grand Prix of Mid-Ohio; Presented by Cooper Tires Honoring First Responders	R Mid-Ohio Sports Car Course	Lexington, Ohio
5	July 29–30	USF2000 Championship Grand Prix of Mid-Ohio; Presented by Cooper Tires Honoring First Responders	R Mid-Ohio Sports Car Course	Lexington, Ohio
6	August 22	Cooper Tires Freedom 75	O Lucas Oil Raceway	Brownsburg, Indiana
7	September 3–4	Cooper Tires USF2000 Indy Grand Prix	R Indianapolis Motor Speedway Road Course	Speedway, Indiana
8	September 3–4	Cooper Tires USF2000 Indy Grand Prix	R Indianapolis Motor Speedway Road Course	Speedway, Indiana
9	September 3–4	Cooper Tires USF2000 Indy Grand Prix	R Indianapolis Motor Speedway Road Course	Speedway, Indiana
10	September 11–13	Cooper Tires USF2000 Grand Prix of Mid-Ohio	R Mid-Ohio Sports Car Course	Lexington, Ohio
11	September 11–13	Cooper Tires USF2000 Grand Prix of Mid-Ohio	R Mid-Ohio Sports Car Course	Lexington, Ohio
12	September 11–13	Cooper Tires USF2000 Grand Prix of Mid-Ohio	R Mid-Ohio Sports Car Course	Lexington, Ohio
13	October 9–11	The Andersen Companies USF2000 Grand Prix at New Jersey Motorsports Park	R New Jersey Motorsports Park	Millville, New Jersey
14	October 9–11	The Andersen Companies USF2000 Grand Prix at New Jersey Motorsports Park	R New Jersey Motorsports Park	Millville, New Jersey
15	October 9–11	The Andersen Companies USF2000 Grand Prix at New Jersey Motorsports Park	R New Jersey Motorsports Park	Millville, New Jersey
16	October 23–25	Cooper Tires USF2000 Grand Prix of St. Petersburg; Presented by Andersen RacePark	R Streets of St. Petersburg	St. Petersburg, Florida
17	October 23–25	Cooper Tires USF2000 Grand Prix of St. Petersburg; Presented by Cooper Tires	R Streets of St. Petersburg	St. Petersburg, Florida

Cancelled events
Date	Race name	Track	City
April 25–26	Never announced	R Circuit of the Americas	Austin, Texas
July 10–12	Never announced	R Exhibition Place	Toronto, Ontario, Canada
September 11–13	Never announced	R Portland International Raceway	Portland, Oregon
September 18–20	Never announced	R WeatherTech Raceway Laguna Seca	Monterey, California

== Race results ==
Round	Race	Pole position	Fastest lap	Most laps led	Race Winner	
Round	Race	Pole position	Fastest lap	Most laps led	Driver	Team
1	Road America 1	(Denmark) Christian Rasmussen	(Denmark) Christian Rasmussen	(Denmark) Christian Rasmussen	(Denmark) Christian Rasmussen	Jay Howard Driver Development
2	Road America 2	(Denmark) Christian Rasmussen	(Denmark) Christian Rasmussen	(Denmark) Christian Rasmussen	(Denmark) Christian Rasmussen	Jay Howard Driver Development
3	Mid-Ohio 1	(Brazil) Eduardo Barrichello	(Denmark) Christian Rasmussen	(Denmark) Christian Rasmussen	(Denmark) Christian Rasmussen	Jay Howard Driver Development
4	Mid-Ohio 2	(Denmark) Christian Rasmussen	(Denmark) Christian Rasmussen	(Denmark) Christian Rasmussen	(Denmark) Christian Rasmussen	Jay Howard Driver Development
5	Mid-Ohio 3	(Denmark) Christian Rasmussen	(Denmark) Christian Rasmussen	(Denmark) Christian Rasmussen	(Denmark) Christian Rasmussen	Jay Howard Driver Development
6	Freedom 75	(Denmark) Christian Rasmussen	(United States) Reece Gold	(Denmark) Christian Rasmussen	(Denmark) Christian Rasmussen	Jay Howard Driver Development
7	Indianapolis GP 1	(Brazil) Kiko Porto	(United States) Reece Gold	(Brazil) Kiko Porto	(Brazil) Eduardo Barrichello	Pabst Racing
8	Indianapolis GP 2	(Brazil) Kiko Porto	(Brazil) Eduardo Barrichello	(Brazil) Eduardo Barrichello	(Brazil) Eduardo Barrichello	Pabst Racing
9	Indianapolis GP 3	(Brazil) Eduardo Barrichello	(United States) Jack William Miller	(United States) Jack William Miller	(United States) Reece Gold	Cape Motorsports
10	Mid-Ohio 4	(Denmark) Christian Rasmussen	(Brazil) Kiko Porto	(United States) Michael d'Orlando	(United States) Michael d'Orlando	Cape Motorsports
11	Mid-Ohio 5	(United States) Reece Gold	(Denmark) Christian Rasmussen	(United States) Reece Gold	(United States) Reece Gold	Cape Motorsports
12	Mid-Ohio 6	(Denmark) Christian Rasmussen	(Denmark) Christian Rasmussen	(Denmark) Christian Rasmussen	(Denmark) Christian Rasmussen	Jay Howard Driver Development
13	New Jersey 1	(Brazil) Eduardo Barrichello	(Brazil) Eduardo Barrichello	(Brazil) Eduardo Barrichello	(Brazil) Eduardo Barrichello	Pabst Racing
14	New Jersey 2	(Denmark) Christian Rasmussen	(United States) Nolan Siegel	(Denmark) Christian Rasmussen	(Denmark) Christian Rasmussen	Jay Howard Driver Development
15	New Jersey 3	(United States) Nolan Siegel	(United States) Prescott Campbell	(Denmark) Christian Rasmussen	(Denmark) Christian Rasmussen	Jay Howard Driver Development
16	St. Petersburg 1	(Australia) Cameron Shields	(United States) Reece Gold	(Brazil) Kiko Porto	(Brazil) Kiko Porto	DEForce Racing
17	St. Petersburg 2	(United States) Christian Brooks	(Brazil) Kiko Porto	(United States) Christian Brooks	(United States) Christian Brooks	Exclusive Autosport

== Championship standings ==
=== Drivers' Championship ===
Scoring system

Position	**1st**	**2nd**	**3rd**	**4th**	**5th**	**6th**	**7th**	**8th**	**9th**	**10th**	**11th**	**12th**	**13th**	**14th**	**15th**	**16th**	**17th**	**18th**	**19th**	**20th**
Points	30	25	22	19	17	15	14	13	12	11	10	9	8	7	6	5	4	3	2	1
Points (O)	45	38	33	29	26	23	21	20	18	17	15	14	12	11	9	8	6	5	4	2

- The driver who qualifies on pole is awarded one additional point.
- One point is awarded to the driver who leads the most laps in a race.
- One point is awarded to the driver who sets the fastest lap during the race.

Pos	Driver	ROA		MOH			LOR	IMS			MOH			NJMP			STP		Points
1	(Denmark) Christian Rasmussen	**1***	**1***	1*	**1***	**1***	**1***	6	5	21	**14**	20	**1***	2	**1***	1*	19	5	394
2	(Brazil) Eduardo Barrichello	3	5	**2**	11	6	10	1	1*	**5**	10	2	7	**1***	3	7	2	3	353
3	(United States) Reece Gold	19	7	3	2	3	2	2	7	1	2	**1***	3	15	6	9	3	9	341
4	(United States) Michael d'Orlando	5	2	4	10	2	4	20	6	19	1*	7	2	3	4	17	5	4	295
5	(United States) Christian Brooks	8	20	6	5	4	5	9	3	2	4	4	8	4	7	5	20	**1***	284
6	(United States) Josh Green	2	3	17	8	7	6	4	11	6	5	19	9	18	9	2	4	11	245
7	(United Kingdom) Matthew Round-Garrido	4	4	5	4	19	7	7	14	9	8	5	6	8	17	14	7	6	228
8	(United States) Jack William Miller	18	13	16	17	5	3	21	2	4*	15	6	10	7	8	11	6	7	215
9	(Australia) Cameron Shields	7	6	9	9	DNS	12	11	13	7	6	3	5	6	2	6	**18**	19	214
10	(Brazil) Kiko Porto			8	18	11	14	**3***	**4**	3	7	8	11				1*	2	198
11	(United States) Prescott Campbell	10	12	11	12	18	13	14	16	10	21	10	15	5	11	3	12	8	167
12	(United States) Yuven Sundaramoorthy	9	8	20	6	9	9	8	9	14	9	14	16	10	5	12	21	DNS	165
13	(United States) Nolan Siegel	20	14	18	3	14	11	5	8	20	3	9	19	9	18	**18**	14	12	158
14	(United States) Kyle Dupell	14	10	7	7	8	8	18	21	18	20	21	12	17	13	4	9	14	147
15	(United States) Christian Bogle	6	9	19	14	13	16	15	15	15	11	11	13	11	12	8	10	18	144
16	(United States) Wyatt Brichacek	16	17	12	20	12	18	12	17	13	12	12	14	14	15	16	16	10	113
17	(United States) Bijoy Garg	11	15	10	13	10	17	13	19	11							11	17	86
18	(United States) Max Kaeser	15	18	14	15	16	15	10	10	8	18	17	21						79
19	(United States) Simon Sikes							16	12	16	13	18	4				8	13	70
20	(United States) Josh Pierson	13	19	15	16	17	19	17	18	12	17	16	18	13	10	10	15	DNS	57
21	(Canada) Nico Christodoulou	17	11											12	16	15			34
22	(United States) Ayrton Ori	12	16	13	19	15													30
23	(United States) Michael Myers							19	20	17	19	15	17				17	15	29
24	(United States) Kent Vaccaro													16	14	13			20
25	(United States) Josh Sarchet										16	13	20						14
26	(Mexico) Gil Molina																13	16	13

Color	Result
Gold	Winner
Silver	2nd place
Bronze	3rd place
Green	4th & 5th place
Light Blue	6th–10th place
Dark Blue	Finished (Outside Top 10)
Purple	Did not finish
Red	Did not qualify (DNQ)
Brown	Withdrawn (Wth)
Black	Disqualified (DSQ)
White	Did not start (DNS)
Blank	Did not participate

**In-line notation**
**Bold**	Pole position (1 point)
Italics	Ran fastest race lap (1 point)
*	Led most race laps (1 point); Not awarded if more than one driver leads most laps
Rookie

== See also ==
- 2020 IndyCar Series
- 2020 Indy Lights (canceled)
- 2020 Indy Pro 2000 Championship
