= Ernest Sikes =

American auto racing driver

Ernest Sikes is a former American racing driver. Sikes won the 1993 SCCA American Continental Championship, a precursor of the USF2000 series. Sikes also competed in the SCCA National Championship Runoffs.

Sikes, racing out of Lithonia, Georgia, raced in the 1991 SCCA National Championship Runoffs. Racing in the Spec Racer class, the Georgia racing driver qualified on pole position. Despite leading a couple of laps, Sikes finished in seventh place. He returned to the Runoffs in 1992 in the Formula Continental class. Again qualifying on pole position, Dave Weitzenhof won the race and Sikes settled for second place. Also in 1992 Sikes made his debut in the professional Formula Continental series, the USAC FF2000 Eastern Division. At Road Atlanta, Sikes finished in second place, behind Tom Schwietz. Joining Primus Racing in 1993, Sikes raced in the SCCA sanctioned professional Formula Continental series, the American Continental Championship. The season was very successful. Sikes won races at Road Atlanta, Infineon Raceway, Des Moines and Trois-Rivières. As he also finished the two other races on the podium, Sikes won the championship.

== Motorsports results ==
=== SCCA National Championship Runoffs ===
Year	Track	Car	Engine	Class	Finish	Start	Status
1991	Road Atlanta	Spec Racer	Ford	Spec Racer	7	1	Running
1992	Road Atlanta	Van Diemen RF92	Ford	Formula Continental	2	1	Running

=== American Open-Wheel racing results ===
(key) (Races in bold indicate pole position, races in italics indicate fastest race lap)

==== American Continental Championship results ====
Year	Entrant	1	2	3	4	5	6	7	Pos	Points
1993	Primus Racing	ATL; 1	MOS; 3	SON; 1	IOW; 1	WGI; 3	TRR; 1		1st	
1994		MOS1	WGI	IOW	TRR	MOS2	ATL; 22	DAL	-	0
