= 2021 USF2000 Championship =

Racing season

The 2021 USF2000 Championship was the twelfth season of the USF2000 Championship since its revival in 2010. The championship serves as the first rung of the IndyCar Series's Road to Indy ladder system. An 18 race schedule was announced on October 21, 2020, featuring five permanent road courses, two street circuits, and a single oval in the Dave Steele Classic.

== Drivers and teams ==
Team	No.	Drivers	Rounds
Cape Motorsports	2	(Canada) Thomas Nepveu	All
Cape Motorsports	3	(United States) Evan Stamer	All
Cape Motorsports	4	(United States) Michael d'Orlando	All
Cape Motorsports	5	(United States) Spike Kohlbecker	All
DEForce Racing	1	(United States) Ely Navarro	All
DEForce Racing	10	(United States) Nolan Siegel	All
DEForce Racing	11	(United States) Prescott Campbell	All
DEForce Racing	12	(Brazil) Kiko Porto	All
Exclusive Autosport	44	(United States) Christian Brooks	1–16
Exclusive Autosport	90	(United States) Grant Palmer	1–7
Exclusive Autosport	91	(New Zealand) Billy Frazer	All
Exclusive Autosport	92	(United Kingdom) Matthew Round-Garrido	1−13
Force Indy	99	(United States) Myles Rowe	All
Jay Howard Driver Development	6	(United States) Bijoy Garg	All
Jay Howard Driver Development	7	(United States) Chase Hyland	11–13
Jay Howard Driver Development	8	(United States) Jackson Lee	1−13, 17–18
Jay Howard Driver Development	9	(New Zealand) Peter Vodanovich	1–16
Joe Dooling Autosports	63	(United States) Trey Burke	All
Michael Myers Racing	42	(United States) Michael Myers	3−18
Miller Vinatieri Motorsports	16	(United States) Kent Vaccaro	All
Legacy Autosport	19	(United States) Andre Castro	1–4, 17–18
Legacy Autosport	19	(United States) Simon Sikes	5–7, 9–13
Legacy Autosport	19	(United States) Nathan Byrd	8
Legacy Autosport	20	(United States) Nathan Byrd	11–16
Legacy Autosport	20	(United States) Simon Sikes	1–2
Pabst Racing	22	(United States) Yuven Sundaramoorthy	All
Pabst Racing	23	(United States) Jace Denmark	All
Pabst Racing	24	(United States) Josh Pierson	All
Turn 3 Motorsport	32	(United States) Christian Weir	11–18
Turn 3 Motorsport	33	(United States) Josh Green	All
Turn 3 Motorsport	34	(United States) Dylan Christie	All
Velocity Racing Development	29	(United States) Erik Evans	1–7, 9–13

== Schedule ==
Rd.	Date	Race name	Track	Location
1	April 17–18	Cooper Tires USF2000 Grand Prix of Barber Motorsports Park	R Barber Motorsports Park	Birmingham, Alabama
2	April 17–18	Cooper Tires USF2000 Grand Prix of Barber Motorsports Park	R Barber Motorsports Park	Birmingham, Alabama
3	April 24–25	USF2000 Grand Prix of St. Petersburg; Presented by Andersen RacePark	R Streets of St. Petersburg	St. Petersburg, Florida
4	April 24–25	USF2000 Grand Prix of St. Petersburg; Presented by Andersen Interior Contracting	R Streets of St. Petersburg	St. Petersburg, Florida
5	May 14–15	USF2000 Grand Prix of Indianapolis; Presented by Cooper Tires	R Indianapolis Motor Speedway Road Course	Speedway, Indiana
6	May 14–15	USF2000 Grand Prix of Indianapolis; Presented by Cooper Tires	R Indianapolis Motor Speedway Road Course	Speedway, Indiana
7	May 14–15	USF2000 Grand Prix of Indianapolis; Presented by Cooper Tires	R Indianapolis Motor Speedway Road Course	Speedway, Indiana
8	May 29*	Cooper Tires Freedom 75	O Lucas Oil Raceway	Brownsburg, Indiana
9	June 19–20	Cooper Tires USF2000 Championship Grand Prix of Road America	R Road America	Elkhart Lake, Wisconsin
10	June 19–20	Cooper Tires USF2000 Championship Grand Prix of Road America	R Road America	Elkhart Lake, Wisconsin
11	July 3–4	Cooper Tires USF2000 Grand Prix of Mid-Ohio	R Mid-Ohio Sports Car Course	Lexington, Ohio
12	July 3–4	Cooper Tires USF2000 Grand Prix of Mid-Ohio	R Mid-Ohio Sports Car Course	Lexington, Ohio
13	July 3–4	Cooper Tires USF2000 Grand Prix of Mid-Ohio	R Mid-Ohio Sports Car Course	Lexington, Ohio
14	August 28–29	Cooper Tires USF2000 Grand Prix	R New Jersey Motorsports Park	Millville, New Jersey
15	August 28–29	Cooper Tires USF2000 Grand Prix	R New Jersey Motorsports Park	Millville, New Jersey
16	August 28–29	Cooper Tires USF2000 Grand Prix	R New Jersey Motorsports Park	Millville, New Jersey
17	October 3–4	VP Racing Fuels Champhionship Weekend Presented By Cooper Tires	R Mid-Ohio Sports Car Course	Lexington, Ohio
18	October 3–4	VP Racing Fuels Champhionship Weekend Presented By Cooper Tires	R Mid-Ohio Sports Car Course	Lexington, Ohio

* The race at Lucas Oil Raceway was originally scheduled for May 28, but was postponed due to inclement weather. The October Mid-Ohio race replaced Toronto.

== Race results ==
Round	Race	Pole position	Fastest lap	Most laps led	Race Winner	
Round	Race	Pole position	Fastest lap	Most laps led	Driver	Team
1	Birmingham 1	(United States) Yuven Sundaramoorthy	(United States) Nolan Siegel	(United States) Yuven Sundaramoorthy	(United States) Yuven Sundaramoorthy	Pabst Racing
2	Birmingham 2	(United States) Nolan Siegel	(New Zealand) Peter Vodanovich	(United States) Prescott Campbell	(United States) Prescott Campbell	DEForce Racing
3	St. Petersburg 1	(United States) Christian Brooks	(United States) Yuven Sundaramoorthy	(United States) Christian Brooks	(United States) Christian Brooks	Exclusive Autosport
4	St. Petersburg 2	(Brazil) Kiko Porto	(United States) Christian Brooks	(Brazil) Kiko Porto	(United States) Christian Brooks	Exclusive Autosport
5	Indianapolis GP 1	(United States) Christian Brooks	(United States) Nolan Siegel	(United States) Christian Brooks	(United States) Yuven Sundaramoorthy	Pabst Racing
6	Indianapolis GP 2	(United States) Yuven Sundaramoorthy	(United States) Yuven Sundaramoorthy	(United States) Yuven Sundaramoorthy	(United States) Yuven Sundaramoorthy	Pabst Racing
7	Indianapolis GP 3	(United States) Yuven Sundaramoorthy	(United States) Yuven Sundaramoorthy	(Brazil) Kiko Porto	(Brazil) Kiko Porto	DEForce Racing
8	Lucas Oil	(United States) Michael d'Orlando	(United States) Prescott Campbell	(United States) Michael d'Orlando	(United States) Michael d'Orlando	Cape Motorsports
9	Road America 1	(Brazil) Kiko Porto	(United States) Michael d'Orlando	(Brazil) Kiko Porto	(Brazil) Kiko Porto	DEForce Racing
10	Road America 2	(Brazil) Kiko Porto	(United States) Simon Sikes	(Canada) Thomas Nepveu	(Canada) Thomas Nepveu	Cape Motorsports
11	Mid-Ohio 1	(Brazil) Kiko Porto	(United States) Michael d'Orlando	(Brazil) Kiko Porto	(United States) Michael d'Orlando	Cape Motorsports
12	Mid-Ohio 2	(Brazil) Kiko Porto	(United States) Jackson Lee	(Brazil) Kiko Porto	(Brazil) Kiko Porto	DEForce Racing
13	Mid-Ohio 3	(Brazil) Kiko Porto	(United States) Yuven Sundaramoorthy	(United States) Michael d'Orlando	(United States) Michael d'Orlando	Cape Motorsports
14	New Jersey 1	(United States) Yuven Sundaramoorthy	(Brazil) Kiko Porto	(Brazil) Kiko Porto	(Brazil) Kiko Porto	DEForce Racing
15	New Jersey 2	(United States) Michael d'Orlando	(United States) Christian Weir	(Brazil) Kiko Porto	(United States) Myles Rowe	Force Indy
16	New Jersey 3	(United States) Michael d'Orlando	(New Zealand) Billy Frazer	(United States) Nolan Siegel	(United States) Nolan Siegel	DEForce Racing
17	Mid-Ohio 4	(United States) Michael d'Orlando	(United States) Yuven Sundaramoorthy	(United States) Yuven Sundaramoorthy	(United States) Yuven Sundaramoorthy	Pabst Racing
18	Mid-Ohio 5	(United States) Michael d'Orlando	(Brazil) Kiko Porto	(United States) Josh Green	(United States) Josh Green	Turn 3 Motorsport

== Championship standings ==
=== Drivers' Championship ===
Scoring system

Position	**1st**	**2nd**	**3rd**	**4th**	**5th**	**6th**	**7th**	**8th**	**9th**	**10th**	**11th**	**12th**	**13th**	**14th**	**15th**	**16th**	**17th**	**18th**	**19th**	**20th+**
Points	30	25	22	19	17	15	14	13	12	11	10	9	8	7	6	5	4	3	2	1
Points (O)	45	38	33	29	26	23	21	20	18	17	15	14	12	11	9	8	6	5	3	2

- The driver who qualifies on pole is awarded one additional point.
- One point is awarded to the driver who leads the most laps in a race.
- One point is awarded to the driver who sets the fastest lap during the race.

Pos	Driver	ALA		STP		IMS			LOR	ROA		MOH			NJMP			MOH		Points
1	(Brazil) Kiko Porto	10	4	5	**2***	7	3	1*	4	**1***	**5**	**2***	**1***	**5**	1*	2*	8	3	3	413
2	(United States) Michael d'Orlando	4	9	20	3	2	4	4	**1***	2	22	1	2	1*	5	**18**	**4**	**2**	**4**	365
3	(United States) Yuven Sundaramoorthy	**1***	10	3	24	1	**1***	**3**	6	8	6	10	14	3	**2**	20	3	1*	19	329
4	(United States) Josh Pierson	3	3	7	10	4	2	2	8	9	3	8	12	11	6	11	5	11	6	291
5	(United States) Josh Green	9	7	18	5	5	6	8	7	10	4	9	10	21	4	4	2	4	1*	279
6	(United States) Christian Brooks	5	5	**1***	1	**3***	5	DSQ	5	5	20	11	8	6	3	10	17			257
7	(United States) Spike Kohlbecker	7	11	6	6	6	7	7	11	3	8	14	11	10	10	7	11	10	7	235
8	(United States) Nolan Siegel	11	**2**	26	21	23	24	14	9	4	23	5	6	19	8	3	1*	6	2	227
9	(Canada) Thomas Nepveu	13	8	11	7	9	8	5	15	11	1*	13	5	9	16	13	15	7	8	220
10	(United States) Prescott Campbell	2	1*	16	9	22	9	6	2	12	24	27	13	27	11	6	9	21	5	215
11	(United States) Jace Denmark	8	12	15	11	10	20	15	3	6	7	7	9	7	7	5	7	20	15	210
12	(New Zealand) Billy Frazer	6	13	4	12	12	16	12	13	25	13	4	7	15	9	12	10	8	9	192
13	(United States) Myles Rowe	24	6	8	23	21	10	23	12	20	10	28	16	28	13	1	16	5	21	137
14	(United States) Simon Sikes	16	17			11	14	21		7	2	3	3	2						136
15	(United States) Dylan Christie	21	20	9	13	8	11	24	10	15	9	20	25	26	15	14	13	12	14	121
16	(United Kingdom) Matthew Round-Garrido	25	22	2	4	25	12	20	24	13	19	12	4	4						116
17	(United States) Ely Navarro	18	18	13	16	15	18	13	14	19	14	19	18	17	14	8	12	13	18	105
18	(United States) Jackson Lee	12	14	14	18	26	DNS	9	18	23	18	18	26	13				18	12	73
19	(United States) Evan Stamer	19	21	23	20	17	23	19	16	18	11	16	15	24	18	16	20	22	11	65
20	(New Zealand) Peter Vodanovich	23	23	21	15	19	15	16	23	16	15	15	28	8	17	19	22			63
21	(United States) Christian Weir											17	19	20	12	9	6	9	20	57
22	(United States) Erik Evans	15	16	22	14	16	13	10		22	25	25	21	14						54
23	(United States) Trey Burke	20	26	24	19	18	21	18	22	17	17	22	17	25	23	15	14	17	13	54
24	(United States) Kent Vaccaro	17	25	25	DNS	20	19	17	17	24	16	21	22	16	19	21	18	16	16	48
25	(United States) Andre Castro	22	19	10	8													14	10	45
26	(United States) Michael Myers			17	22	13	DNS	11	19	21	21	24	20	12	21	23	21	19	22	45
27	(United States) Bijoy Garg	DSQ	25	19	DNS	24	22	25	20	14	12	6	27	18	20†	22†	19†	15†	17†	43
28	(United States) Grant Palmer	14	15	12	17	14	17	22												38
29	(United States) Nathan Byrd								21			23	24	22	22	17	23			11
30	(United States) Chase Hyland											26	23	23						3

Color	Result
Gold	Winner
Silver	2nd place
Bronze	3rd place
Green	4th & 5th place
Light Blue	6th–10th place
Dark Blue	Finished (Outside Top 10)
Purple	Did not finish
Red	Did not qualify (DNQ)
Brown	Withdrawn (Wth)
Black	Disqualified (DSQ)
White	Did not start (DNS)
Blank	Did not participate

**In-line notation**
**Bold**	Pole position (1 point)
Italics	Ran fastest race lap (1 point)
*	Led most race laps (1 point); Not awarded if more than one driver leads most laps
Rookie

† Bijoy Garg was not eligible for points at the New Jersey Motorsports Park and the second Mid-Ohio rounds for exceeding the maximum allotted test days for championship drivers.

== See also ==
- 2021 IndyCar Series
- 2021 Indy Lights
- 2021 Indy Pro 2000 Championship
