= Trey Burke (racing driver) =

American racing driver

- Nationality: (United States) American
- Born: Trey E. Burke III; November 4, 2004 (age 22) Alvin, Texas, U.S.

U.S. F2000 National Championship career
- Debut season: 2021
- Former teams: Joe Dooling Autosports, Future Star Racing
- Starts: 29
- Championships: 0
- Wins: 1
- Podiums: 0
- Best finish: 21st in 2022

Previous series
- 2020: F1600 Championship Series

Awards
- 2021 Hard Charger U.S. F2000 National Championship 2020 Hard Charger Lucas Oil Formula Championship Series 2019 IMCA National Sprint Car Rookie of the Year 2017 POWRi NOW600's Most Respected Driver

NASCAR FedEx Freight Truck Series career
- 1 race run over 1 year
- 2022 position: 82nd
- Best finish: 82nd (2022)
- First race: 2022 O'Reilly Auto Parts 150 (Mid-Ohio)
Wins	Top tens	Poles
0	0	0
- Statistics up to date as of November 5, 2022.

Trey E. Burke III (born November 4, 2004) is an American professional racing driver. He is currently competing full-time in the IHRA Stock Car Series, driving the No. 50 Chevrolet for Ross Dalton Racing.

Burke is a fourth generation driver from Texas who started on dirt at nine years old. He has previously competed in the U.S. F2000 National Championship for Joe Dooling Autosports. He has also previously won in the International Motor Contest Association, where he became the series' youngest winner at the ago of fourteen.

== Racing career ==
On July 4, 2022, it was announced that Burke would make his NASCAR debut in the Truck Series, driving for Young's Motorsports in the race at Mid-Ohio. On September 9, it was revealed that Burke would return to Young's Motorsports to make his ARCA Menards Series debut driving the team's No. 02 car at Toledo Speedway, although he nor the team would not appear on the entry list for the race.

== Racing record ==
=== Career summary ===
Season	Series	Team	Races	Wins	Poles	F/Laps	Podiums	Points	Position
2017	POWRi Lonestar 600 - Winged A-Class	Burke Motorsports	17	0	0	0	0		3rd
2018	National Open Wheel 600 Series - Stock Non-Wing	Burke Motorsports	23	0	0	0	0	286	3rd
2018	National Open Wheel 600 Series - Winged A-Class	Burke Motorsports	21	0	0	0	3	345	3rd
2019	IMCA National Sprint Car Series - Texas	Burke Motorsports	22	3	2	0	6	624	2nd
2019	IMCA National Sprint Car Series - National	Burke Motorsports	22	3	2	0	6	624	17th
2020	Lucas Oil Formula Race Car Series	Lucas Oil School of Racing	18	2	1	0	7	419	6th
2020	F1600 Championship Series	Rice Race Prep	6	1	0	0	2	0	31st
2021	U.S. F2000 National Championship	Joe Dooling Autosports	18	0	0	0	0	54	23rd
2022	U.S. F2000 National Championship	Joe Dooling Autosports	10	0	0	0	0	60	21st
2022	Indy Pro 2000 Championship	Turn 3 Motorsport	1	0	0	0	0	14	20th
2023	USF2000 Championship	Future Star Racing	2	0	0	0	0	29	25th

*Season still in progress.

=== American open-wheel racing results ===
==== U.S. F2000 National Championship ====
(key) (Races in bold indicate pole position) (Races in italics indicate fastest lap) (Races with * indicate most race laps led)

Year	Team	1	2	3	4	5	6	7	8	9	10	11	12	13	14	15	16	17	18	Rank	Points
2021	Joe Dooling Autosports	ALA; 1; 20	ALA; 2; 26	STP; 1; 24	STP; 2; 19	IMS; 1; 18	IMS; 2; 21	IMS; 3; 18	LOR; 22	ROA; 1; 17	ROA; 2; 17	MOH; 1; 22	MOH; 2; 17	MOH; 3; 25	NJM; 1; 23	NJM; 2; 15	NJM; 3; 14	MOH; 4; 17	MOH; 5; 13	23rd	54
2022	Joe Dooling Autosports	STP; 1; 7	STP; 2; 18	ALA; 1; 16	ALA; 2; 14	IMS; 1; 10	IMS; 2; 21	IMS; 3; 20	IRP; 13	ROA; 1; 17	ROA; 2; 19	MOH; 1	MOH; 2	MOH; 3	TOR; 1	TOR; 2	POR; 1	POR; 2	POR; 3	21st	60
2023	Future Star Racing	STP; 1; 7	STP; 2; 6	SEB; 1	SEB; 2	IMS; 1	IMS; 2	IMS; 3	IRP	ROA; 1	ROA; 2	MOH; 1	MOH; 2	MOH; 3	TOR; 1	TOR; 2	POR; 1	POR; 2	POR; 3	25th	29

*Season still in progress.

=== NASCAR ===
(key) (Bold – Pole position awarded by qualifying time. Italics – Pole position earned by points standings or practice time. * – Most laps led.)

==== Camping World Truck Series ====
NASCAR Camping World Truck Series results
Year	Team	No.	Make	1	2	3	4	5	6	7	8	9	10	11	12	13	14	15	16	17	18	19	20	21	22	23	NCWTS	Pts	Ref
2022	Young's Motorsports	20	Chevy	DAY	LVS	ATL	COA	MAR	BRI	DAR	KAN	TEX	CLT	GTW	SON	KNX	NSH	MOH; 35	POC	IRP	RCH	KAN	BRI	TAL	HOM	PHO	82nd	2	

=== CARS Pro Late Model Tour ===
(key)

CARS Pro Late Model Tour results
Year	Team	No.	Make	1	2	3	4	5	6	7	8	9	10	11	12	13	CPLMTC	Pts	Ref
2025	Hettinger Racing	4	Chevy	AAS	CDL	OCS	ACE	NWS	CRW; 8	HCY	HCY	AND; 8	FLC	SBO; 12	TCM; 10	NWS; 18	14th	154	

^{*} Season still in progress

=== IHRA Late Model Sportsman Series ===
(key) (Bold – Pole position awarded by qualifying time. Italics – Pole position earned by points standings or practice time. * – Most laps led. ** – All laps led.)

IHRA Late Model Sportsman Series
Year	Team	No.	Make	1	2	3	ISCSS	Pts	Ref
2026	Ross Dalton Racing	50	Chevy	DUB; 7	CDL; 6	AND; 23	7th	105	
