= Max Kaeser =

American race car driver (born 2003)

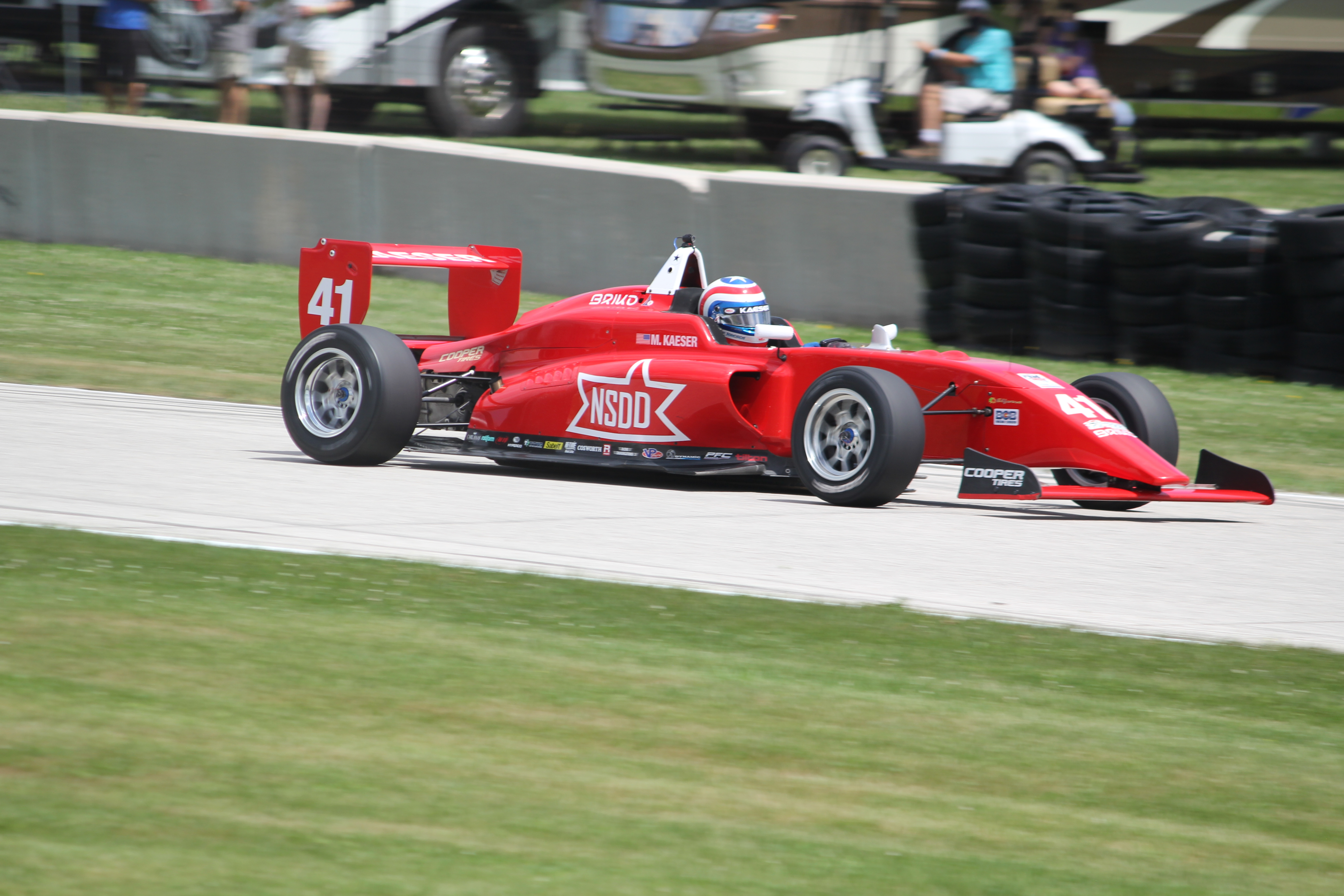
- Kaeser at Road America in 2020
- Nationality: (United States) American
- Born: May 15, 2003 (age 23) Cincinnati, Ohio, U.S.

U.S. F2000 National Championship career
- Debut season: 2020
- Current team: Miller Vinatieri Motorsports
- Car number: 41
- Starts: 12
- Wins: 0
- Poles: 0
- Fastest laps: 0

Maxwell Kaeser (born May 15, 2003) is an American race car driver.

== Racing career ==
=== Early career ===
Kaeser began karting at the age of four at G&J Kartway. He began running national events at the age of seven competing in various cadet and sportsman classes from 2011 to 2014. In 2018, Kaeser made the full time transition to cars competing in SCCA Divisional Formula F, clinching the 2018 Rocky Mountain Division SCCA Formula F Championship, 2018 Rocky Mountain Division SCCA Rookie of the Year Award, 2019 Rocky Mountain Division SCCA Formula F Championship, and 2019 SCCA Mid-States Majors Conference Championship.

=== USF2000 ===
In 2019, Kaeser participated in the Chris Griffis Memorial Test with Miller Vinatieri Motorsports. In late 2019, it was announced that he would continue with the team for the 2020 season.

== Racing record ==
=== Career summary ===
Season	Series	Team	Races	Wins	Poles	F/Laps	Podiums	Points	Position
2018	Rocky Mountain Division SCCA Formula F	N/A	16	10	N/A	N/A	15	120	1st
2019	Rocky Mountain Division SCCA Formula F	N/A	8	7	N/A	N/A	8	93	1st
2019	SCCA Mid-States Majors Conference Formula F	N/A	4	3	4	4	4	96	1st
2020	U.S. F2000 National Championship	Miller Vinatieri Motorsports	12	0	0	0	0	79	18th

* Season still in progress

== Motorsports career results ==
=== American open–wheel racing results ===
==== U.S. F2000 Championship ====
Year	Team	1	2	3	4	5	6	7	8	9	10	11	12	13	14	15	16	17	Rank	Points
2020	Miller Vinatieri Motorsports	ROA; 15	ROA; 18	MOH; 14	MOH; 15	MOH; 16	LOR; 15	IMS; 10	IMS; 10	IMS; 8	MOH; 18	MOH; 17	MOH; 21	NJMP	NJMP	NJMP	STP	STP	18th	79

* Season still in progress
