= 2022 O'Reilly Auto Parts 150 at Mid-Ohio =

15th race of the 2022 NASCAR Camping World Truck Series

Race details
- Race 15 of 23 of the 2022 NASCAR Camping World Truck Series
- Date: July 9, 2022
- Location: Mid-Ohio Sports Car Course, Lexington, Ohio
- Course: Permanent racing facility
- Course length: 2.400 miles (3.862 km)
- Distance: 67 laps, 151 mi (243 km)
- Average speed: 65.116 mph (104.794 km/h)

Pole position
Driver	Corey Heim	Kyle Busch Motorsports
- Time: 1:57.500

Most laps led
Driver	Parker Kligerman	Henderson Motorsports
- Laps: 56

Winner
No. 75	Parker Kligerman	Henderson Motorsports

Television in the United States
- Network: Fox Sports 1
- Announcers: Vince Welch, Phil Parsons, and Andy Lally

Radio in the United States
- Radio: Motor Racing Network

The 2022 O'Reilly Auto Parts 150 at Mid-Ohio was the 15th stock car race of the 2022 NASCAR Camping World Truck Series, and the first iteration of the event. The race was held on Saturday, July 9, 2022, in Lexington, Ohio at Mid-Ohio Sports Car Course, a 2.400 miles (3.862 km) permanent road course. The race took its scheduled 67 laps to complete. After an exciting battle with 3 laps to go, Parker Kligerman, driving for Henderson Motorsports, held off Zane Smith for his third career NASCAR Camping World Truck Series win, and his first of the season. Kligerman would also dominate the race in general, leading 56 laps. To fill out the podium, Carson Hocevar, driving for Niece Motorsports, would finish in 3rd, respectively.

This was the debut race for Trey Burke, Connor Mosack, Kenko Miura, and Stephen Mallozzi.

== Background ==
Mid-Ohio Sports Car Course is a road course auto racing facility located in Troy Township, Morrow County, Ohio, United States, just outside the village of Lexington. Mid-Ohio has also colloquially become a term for the entire north-central region of the state, from south of Sandusky to the north of Columbus. It hosts a number of racing series such as IndyCar, IMSA WeatherTech Sportscar Championship, NASCAR Xfinity Series, and the ARCA Menards Series, along with other club events such has SCCA and National Auto Sport Association.

=== Entry list ===
- (R) denotes rookie driver.

#	Driver	Team	Make
1	Hailie Deegan	David Gilliland Racing	Ford
02	Kaz Grala	Young's Motorsports	Chevrolet
4	John Hunter Nemechek	Kyle Busch Motorsports	Toyota
7	Dylan Lupton	Spire Motorsports	Chevrolet
9	Blaine Perkins (R)	CR7 Motorsports	Chevrolet
12	Spencer Boyd	Young's Motorsports	Chevrolet
15	Tanner Gray	David Gilliland Racing	Ford
16	Tyler Ankrum	Hattori Racing Enterprises	Toyota
17	Taylor Gray	David Gilliland Racing	Ford
18	Chandler Smith	Kyle Busch Motorsports	Toyota
19	Derek Kraus	McAnally–Hilgemann Racing	Chevrolet
20	Trey Burke	Young's Motorsports	Chevrolet
22	Austin Wayne Self	AM Racing	Chevrolet
23	Grant Enfinger	GMS Racing	Chevrolet
24	Jack Wood (R)	GMS Racing	Chevrolet
25	Matt DiBenedetto	Rackley W.A.R.	Chevrolet
32	Connor Mosack	Bret Holmes Racing	Chevrolet
33	Kenko Miura	Reaume Brothers Racing	Chevrolet
38	Zane Smith	Front Row Motorsports	Ford
40	Dean Thompson (R)	Niece Motorsports	Chevrolet
41	Justin Marks	Niece Motorsports	Chevrolet
42	Carson Hocevar	Niece Motorsports	Chevrolet
43	Stephen Mallozzi	Reaume Brothers Racing	Toyota
44	Kris Wright	Niece Motorsports	Chevrolet
45	Lawless Alan (R)	Niece Motorsports	Chevrolet
46	Mason Filippi	G2G Racing	Toyota
51	Corey Heim (R)	Kyle Busch Motorsports	Toyota
52	Stewart Friesen	Halmar Friesen Racing	Toyota
56	Timmy Hill	Hill Motorsports	Toyota
61	Chase Purdy	Hattori Racing Enterprises	Toyota
66	Ty Majeski	ThorSport Racing	Toyota
75	Parker Kligerman	Henderson Motorsports	Chevrolet
88	Matt Crafton	ThorSport Racing	Toyota
91	Colby Howard	McAnally–Hilgemann Racing	Chevrolet
98	Christian Eckes	ThorSport Racing	Toyota
99	Ben Rhodes	ThorSport Racing	Toyota
Official entry list

== Practice ==
The only 50-minute practice session was held on Friday, July 8, at 9:35 AM EST. Zane Smith, driving for Front Row Motorsports, was the fastest in the session, with a time of 1:27.605 seconds, and a speed of 92.789 mph (149.329 km/h).

Pos.	#	Driver	Team	Make	Time	Speed
1	38	Zane Smith	Front Row Motorsports	Ford	1:27.605	92.789
2	99	Ben Rhodes	ThorSport Racing	Toyota	1:27.735	92.652
3	75	Parker Kligerman	Henderson Motorsports	Chevrolet	1:27.754	92.632
Full practice results

== Qualifying ==
Qualifying was held on Friday, July 8, at 3:35 PM EST. Since Mid-Ohio Sports Car Course is a road course, the qualifying system used is a two group system, with two rounds. Drivers will be separated into two groups, Group A and Group B. Each driver will have a lap to set a time. The fastest 5 drivers from each group will advance to the final round. Drivers will also have one lap to set a time. The fastest driver to set a time in the round will win the pole.

Round 2 was cancelled due to inclement weather. Corey Heim, driving for Kyle Busch Motorsports, scored the pole for the race, after having the fastest time in Round 1, which was 1:57.500 seconds, and a speed of 69.181 mph (111.336 km/h).

Pos.	#	Driver	Team	Make	Time	Speed
1	51	Corey Heim (R)	Kyle Busch Motorsports	Toyota	1:57.500	69.181
2	75	Parker Kligerman	Henderson Motorsports	Chevrolet	1:58.032	68.869
3	42	Carson Hocevar	Niece Motorsports	Chevrolet	1:58.414	68.647
4	4	John Hunter Nemechek	Kyle Busch Motorsports	Toyota	1:58.738	68.460
5	88	Matt Crafton	ThorSport Racing	Toyota	1:59.165	68.215
6	25	Matt DiBenedetto	Rackley W.A.R.	Chevrolet	1:59.330	68.120
7	16	Tyler Ankrum	Hattori Racing Enterprises	Toyota	1:59.995	67.743
8	41	Justin Marks	Niece Motorsports	Chevrolet	2:00.506	67.456
9	7	Dylan Lupton	Spire Motorsports	Chevrolet	2:00.914	67.228
10	17	Taylor Gray	David Gilliland Racing	Ford	2:02.227	66.506
11	32	Connor Mosack	Bret Holmes Racing	Chevrolet	2:01.233	67.051
12	23	Grant Enfinger	GMS Racing	Chevrolet	2:03.654	65.738
13	38	Zane Smith	Front Row Motorsports	Ford	2:03.780	65.671
14	22	Austin Wayne Self	AM Racing	Chevrolet	2:03.821	65.650
15	99	Ben Rhodes	ThorSport Racing	Toyota	2:04.431	65.328
16	15	Tanner Gray	David Gilliland Racing	Ford	2:05.409	64.818
17	02	Kaz Grala	Young's Motorsports	Chevrolet	2:05.495	64.774
18	20	Trey Burke III	Young's Motorsports	Chevrolet	2:05.911	64.560
19	52	Stewart Friesen	Halmar Friesen Racing	Toyota	2:06.057	64.485
20	98	Christian Eckes	ThorSport Racing	Toyota	2:06.640	64.188
21	66	Ty Majeski	ThorSport Racing	Toyota	2:06.937	64.038
22	61	Chase Purdy	Hattori Racing Enterprises	Toyota	2:07.058	63.977
23	19	Derek Kraus	McAnally–Hilgemann Racing	Chevrolet	2:07.115	63.948
24	46	Mason Filippi	G2G Racing	Toyota	2:07.614	63.698
25	9	Blaine Perkins (R)	CR7 Motorsports	Chevrolet	2:07.911	63.550
26	24	Jack Wood (R)	GMS Racing	Chevrolet	2:08.345	63.336
27	45	Lawless Alan (R)	Niece Motorsports	Chevrolet	2:08.722	63.150
28	1	Hailie Deegan	David Gilliland Racing	Ford	2:08.932	63.047
29	40	Dean Thompson (R)	Niece Motorsports	Chevrolet	2:09.345	62.846
30	91	Colby Howard	McAnally–Hilgemann Racing	Chevrolet	2:09.391	62.824
31	18	Chandler Smith	Kyle Busch Motorsports	Toyota	2:09.814	62.619
Qualified by owner's points
32	33	Kenko Miura	Reaume Brothers Racing	Toyota	2:21.379	57.497
33	44	Kris Wright	Niece Motorsports	Chevrolet	2:22.732	56.951
34	56	Timmy Hill	Hill Motorsports	Toyota	2:23.234	56.752
35	12	Spencer Boyd	Young's Motorsports	Chevrolet	2:24.358	56.310
36	43	Stephen Mallozzi	Reaume Brothers Racing	Toyota	2:35.397	52.310
Official qualifying results
Official starting lineup

== Race results ==
Stage 1 Laps: 15

Pos.	#	Driver	Team	Make	Pts
1	75	Parker Kligerman	Henderson Motorsports	Chevrolet	10
2	38	Zane Smith	Front Row Motorsports	Ford	9
3	4	John Hunter Nemechek	Kyle Busch Motorsports	Toyota	8
4	51	Corey Heim (R)	Kyle Busch Motorsports	Toyota	7
5	23	Grant Enfinger	GMS Racing	Chevrolet	6
6	98	Christian Eckes	ThorSport Racing	Toyota	5
7	16	Tyler Ankrum	Hattori Racing Enterprises	Toyota	4
8	42	Carson Hocevar	Niece Motorsports	Chevrolet	3
9	41	Justin Marks	Niece Motorsports	Chevrolet	2
10	52	Stewart Friesen	Halmar Friesen Racing	Toyota	1

Stage 2 Laps: 20

Pos.	#	Driver	Team	Make	Pts
1	38	Zane Smith	Front Row Motorsports	Ford	10
2	75	Parker Kligerman	Henderson Motorsports	Chevrolet	9
3	51	Corey Heim (R)	Kyle Busch Motorsports	Toyota	8
4	98	Christian Eckes	ThorSport Racing	Toyota	7
5	42	Carson Hocevar	Niece Motorsports	Chevrolet	6
6	23	Grant Enfinger	GMS Racing	Chevrolet	5
7	52	Stewart Friesen	Halmar Friesen Racing	Toyota	4
8	16	Tyler Ankrum	Hattori Racing Enterprises	Toyota	3
9	02	Kaz Grala	Young's Motorsports	Chevrolet	2
10	66	Ty Majeski	ThorSport Racing	Toyota	1

Stage 3 Laps: 32

Fin.	St	#	Driver	Team	Make	Laps	Led	Status	Pts
1	2	75	Parker Kligerman	Henderson Motorsports	Chevrolet	67	56	Running	59
2	13	38	Zane Smith	Front Row Motorsports	Ford	67	8	Running	54
3	3	42	Carson Hocevar	Niece Motorsports	Chevrolet	67	0	Running	43
4	19	52	Stewart Friesen	Halmar Friesen Racing	Toyota	67	0	Running	38
5	20	98	Christian Eckes	ThorSport Racing	Toyota	67	0	Running	44
6	31	18	Chandler Smith	Kyle Busch Motorsports	Toyota	67	0	Running	31
7	17	02	Kaz Grala	Young's Motorsports	Chevrolet	67	0	Running	32
8	23	19	Derek Kraus	McAnally–Hilgemann Racing	Chevrolet	67	0	Running	29
9	30	91	Colby Howard	McAnally–Hilgemann Racing	Chevrolet	67	0	Running	28
10	28	1	Hailie Deegan	David Gilliland Racing	Ford	67	0	Running	27
11	12	23	Grant Enfinger	GMS Racing	Chevrolet	67	0	Running	37
12	21	66	Ty Majeski	ThorSport Racing	Toyota	67	0	Running	26
13	22	61	Chase Purdy	Hattori Racing Enterprises	Toyota	67	0	Running	24
14	14	22	Austin Wayne Self	AM Racing	Chevrolet	67	0	Running	23
15	10	17	Taylor Gray	David Gilliland Racing	Ford	67	0	Running	22
16	35	12	Spencer Boyd	Young's Motorsports	Chevrolet	67	0	Running	21
17	34	56	Timmy Hill	Hill Motorsports	Toyota	67	0	Running	20
18	5	88	Matt Crafton	ThorSport Racing	Toyota	67	0	Running	19
19	6	25	Matt DiBenedetto	Rackley W.A.R.	Chevrolet	67	0	Running	18
20	16	15	Tanner Gray	David Gilliland Racing	Ford	67	0	Running	17
21	7	16	Tyler Ankrum	Hattori Racing Enterprises	Toyota	67	0	Running	23
22	36	43	Stephen Mallozzi	Reaume Brothers Racing	Toyota	67	0	Running	15
23	15	99	Ben Rhodes	ThorSport Racing	Toyota	66	0	Running	14
24	27	45	Lawless Alan (R)	Niece Motorsports	Chevrolet	66	0	Running	13
25	33	44	Kris Wright	Niece Motorsports	Chevrolet	65	0	Accident	12
26	1	51	Corey Heim (R)	Kyle Busch Motorsports	Toyota	60	3	Transmission	26
27	29	40	Dean Thompson (R)	Niece Motorsports	Chevrolet	60	0	Running	10
28	4	4	John Hunter Nemechek	Kyle Busch Motorsports	Toyota	57	0	Running	17
29	26	24	Jack Wood (R)	GMS Racing	Chevrolet	54	0	Accident	8
30	25	9	Blaine Perkins (R)	CR7 Motorsports	Chevrolet	54	0	Accident	7
31	8	41	Justin Marks	Niece Motorsports	Chevrolet	49	0	Accident	8
32	9	7	Dylan Lupton	Spire Motorsports	Chevrolet	47	0	Accident	5
33	32	33	Kenko Miura	Reaume Brothers Racing	Toyota	42	0	Running	4
34	11	32	Connor Mosack	Bret Holmes Racing	Chevrolet	37	0	Brakes	3
35	18	20	Trey Burke III	Young's Motorsports	Chevrolet	16	0	Rear Gear	2
36	24	46	Mason Filippi	G2G Racing	Toyota	9	0	Engine	1
Official race results

== Standings after the race ==
Drivers' Championship standings

Pos	Driver	Points
1	Zane Smith	584
2	John Hunter Nemechek	526 (-58)
3	Chandler Smith	526 (-58)
4	Stewart Friesen	515 (-69)
5	Ben Rhodes	514 (-70)
6	Ty Majeski	503 (-81)
7	Christian Eckes	491 (-93)
8	Carson Hocevar	468 (-116)
9	Grant Enfinger	426 (-158)
10	Matt Crafton	398 (-186)
Official driver's standings

- Note: Only the first 10 positions are included for the driver standings.

Previous race: 2022 Rackley Roofing 200	NASCAR Camping World Truck Series; 2022 season	Next race: 2022 CRC Brakleen 150
