= Tatuus F4-T014 =

Formula racing car

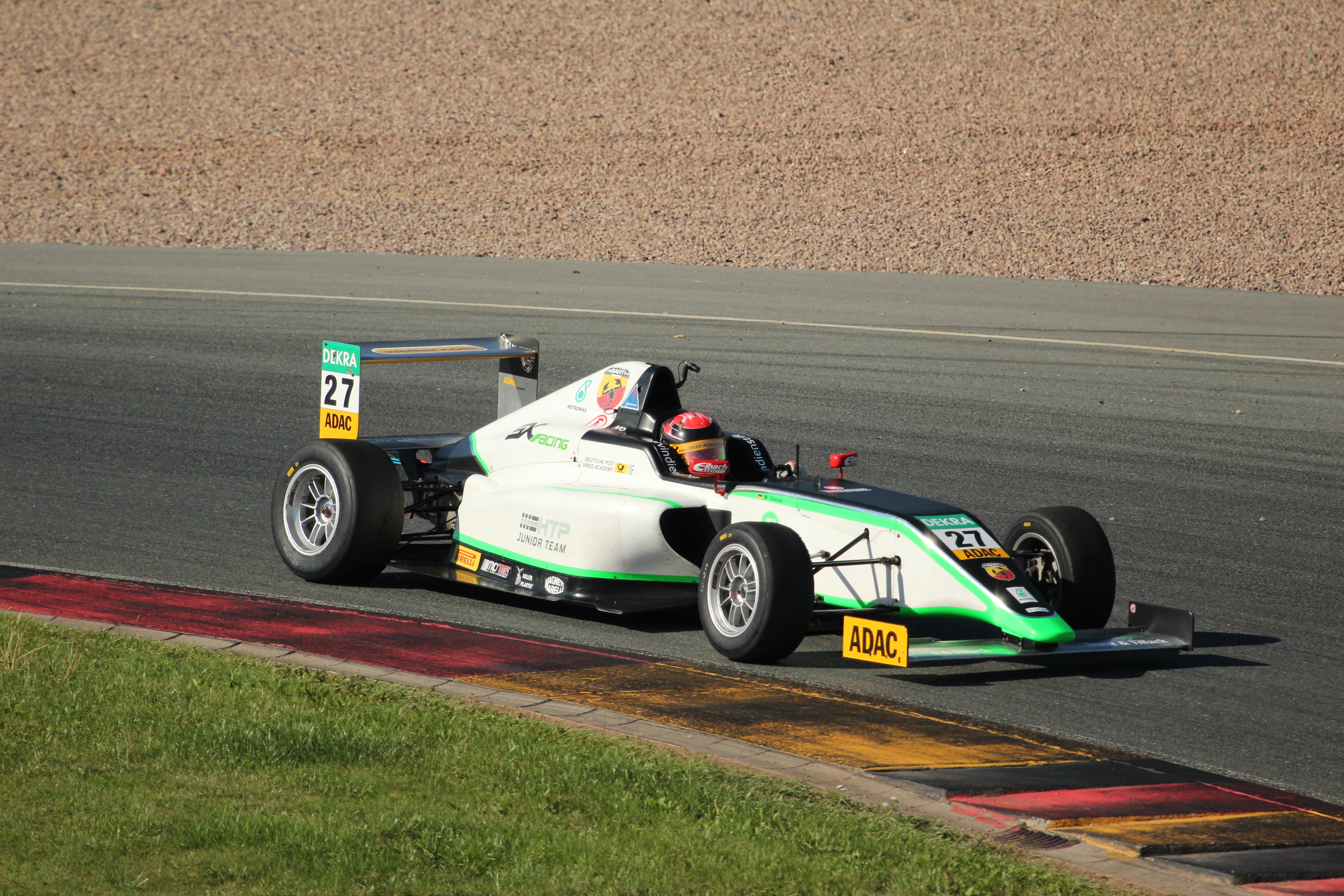
A Tatuus F4-T014 competing in the 2015 German F4 series.

The Tatuus F4-T014 is a junior formula racing car introduced in 2014 by Italian manufacturer Tatuus. The basic chassis is also used in the Tatuus MSV F4-016, Tatuus USF-17 and the Tatuus PM-18.

== F4-T014 and MSV F4-016 ==
The Tatuus F4-T014 was the first racing car homologated according to the FIA Formula 4 rules. The car was first used in the 2014 Italian F4 Championship, won by Lance Stroll. As of 2015 the chassis is also used in the ADAC Formula 4 and the SMP F4 Championship. The Italian manufacturer also got competition with Mygale and Dome entering the FIA Formula 4 market in separate championships. In 2016 Tatuus expanded further supplying the proven chassis to the Spanish and UAE championships. All Tatuus Formula 4 chassis are powered by the Abarth 1.4L inline 4 engine.

The BRDC Formula 4 Championship (not to be confused with the F4 British Championship) was launched by MotorSport Vision using the RFR MSV F4-013 chassis. Tatuus adapted the Tatuus F4-014 chassis to a more powerful Cosworth-Duratec engine. The car was first used in the 2015 BRDC Formula 4 Autumn Trophy won by Ben Barnicoat. The engine used has 70hp more than the Formula 4 spec version, making the car 10 seconds a lap quicker at most circuits. Besides the more powerful engine, the MSV version also has more aero adjustable components.

== Road to Indy ==
Tatuus was announced as the sole chassis supplier for the USF2000 in October 2015. The Tatuus USF-17 replaced the ageing Van Diemen DP08, a tube chassis racecar in use since 2008. To cope with the added risk of racing on oval circuits the car was updated with zylon side intrusion panels. The car is powered by a 2.0L Mazda engine. The USF2000 chassis is also the base car for the Pro Mazda chassis. The Pro Mazda car features the most powerful engine of all F4 based cars, a 2.0L Mazda MZR-PM18A. The engine, developed by Elite Engines, produces 275hp. Mazda factory driver Joel Miller was selected to test drive both the USF-17 and PM-18. The entire car, with modifications, can be used in all three USAC-sanctioned tiers of the Road to Indy, from USF Juniors (JR-23), to USF2000 (USF-22), to Pro 2000 (PRO-22).

== Car comparison ==
| | Tatuus F4-T014 | Tatuus MSV F4-016 | Tatuus USF-17 | Tatuus PM-18 |
|---|---|---|---|---|
| Year | 2014 | 2016 | 2017 | 2018 |
| Championships | Italian Formula 4 Championship; ADAC Formula 4 SMP F4 Championship; Spanish Formula 4 Championship; Formula 4 UAE Championship | BRDC British Formula 3 Championship | USF2000 | Pro Mazda |
| Chassis | FIA Formula 4 homologated carbon fibre composite monocoque | FIA Formula 4 homologated carbon fibre composite monocoque | carbon fibre composite monocoque | carbon fibre composite monocoque |
| Bodywork | Fibre glass | Fibre glass | Carbon fibre | Carbon fibre |
| Engine | Abarth 1.4L FTJ I4 (160hp) | Cosworth-Duratec 2.0L I4 (230hp) | Mazda 2.0L MZR (175hp) | Mazda 2.0L MZR-PM18A (275hp) |
| Transmission | Sequential Sadev six-speed gearbox | Sequential Sadev six-speed gearbox | Sequential Sadev SL75 six-speed gearbox | Sequential Sadev SL75 six-speed gearbox |
| ECU | Magneti Marelli | Magneti Marelli | Cosworth SQ6 | Cosworth SQ6 |
| Front suspension | Double wishbone with pushrods | Double wishbone with pushrods | Double wishbone with pushrods | Double wishbone with pushrods |
| Rear suspension | Double wishbone with pushrods | Double wishbone with pushrods | Double wishbone with pushrods | Double wishbone with pushrods |
| Wheelbase | 2750mm | 2750mm | 2750mm | 2750mm |
| Front track | 1510mm | 1510mm | 1560mm | 1560mm |
| Rear track | 1460mm | 1460mm | 1510mm | 1510mm |
