= USF2000 Championship =

American racing series

- Category: Single seaters
- Country: United States
- Inaugural season: 1990
- Drivers: 33
- Teams: 9
- Constructors: Tatuus
- Engine suppliers: Mazda
- Tyre suppliers: Continental
- Drivers' champion: (Colombia) Sebastián Garzón
- Teams' champion: (United States) Pabst Racing
- Official website: usf2000.com

The USF2000 Championship Presented by Continental Tire is an American racing series using an American variation of the Formula Ford standard, "F2000", that resumed operation for the 2010 season. As of 2022, it is sanctioned by the United States Auto Club (USAC), and operated by Andersen Promotions. It is the second rung of the Road to Indy.

== History ==
=== Andersen/Foschi era ===
The series was initially founded by Doug Powell in 1990, and regularly fielded over 60 entries per race. In the first seasons the series was mainly based in the western part of the United States sanctioned by the United States Auto Club. For 1992 the series started a Western Division and an Eastern Division, the Eastern Division being headed by Dan Andersen and Mike Foschi. In the 1992 season the race at Indianapolis Raceway Park (Night before the 500) and the race at Heartland Park Topeka (East-West Shootout) counted towards both championships and attracted huge fields. It was a regular site at Indianapolis that drivers had to qualify on time to make the grid for the race. In the same year the Sports Car Club of America founded the American Continental Championship. All three classes utilized the same set of rules, based on the SCCA Formula Continental regulations. In 1994 both USAC series were merged into one national championship.

For 1995 the SCCA series merged with the USAC series, creating one national championship co-sanctioned between the SCCA and USAC. The series ran on the same tracks as high ranking series such as the Indy Racing League, NASCAR Cup Series and Trans-Am Series. Many drivers graduated into the higher-ranking series, such as Indy 500 winner Dan Wheldon.

=== Jon Baytos era ===
In June 2001 the series promoter, Formula Motorsports, Inc. (headed by Andersen and Foschi), was sold to Primus Racing, Inc. (headed by Jon Baytos). Jon Baytos introduced a number of controversial rule changes that brought the series out of alignment with similar Sports Car Club of America classes. The two liter Ford NEA engine was replaced by a two-liter Ford Zetec engine which produced ten horsepower more. The shock package was also upgraded. The series also ran under Grand-Am Road Racing sanctioning. The number of competitors dwindled and the series folded at the end of the 2006 season. For 2004 until the series folding in 2006 SCCA Pro Racing was the sanctioning body for the series.

=== IndyCar era ===
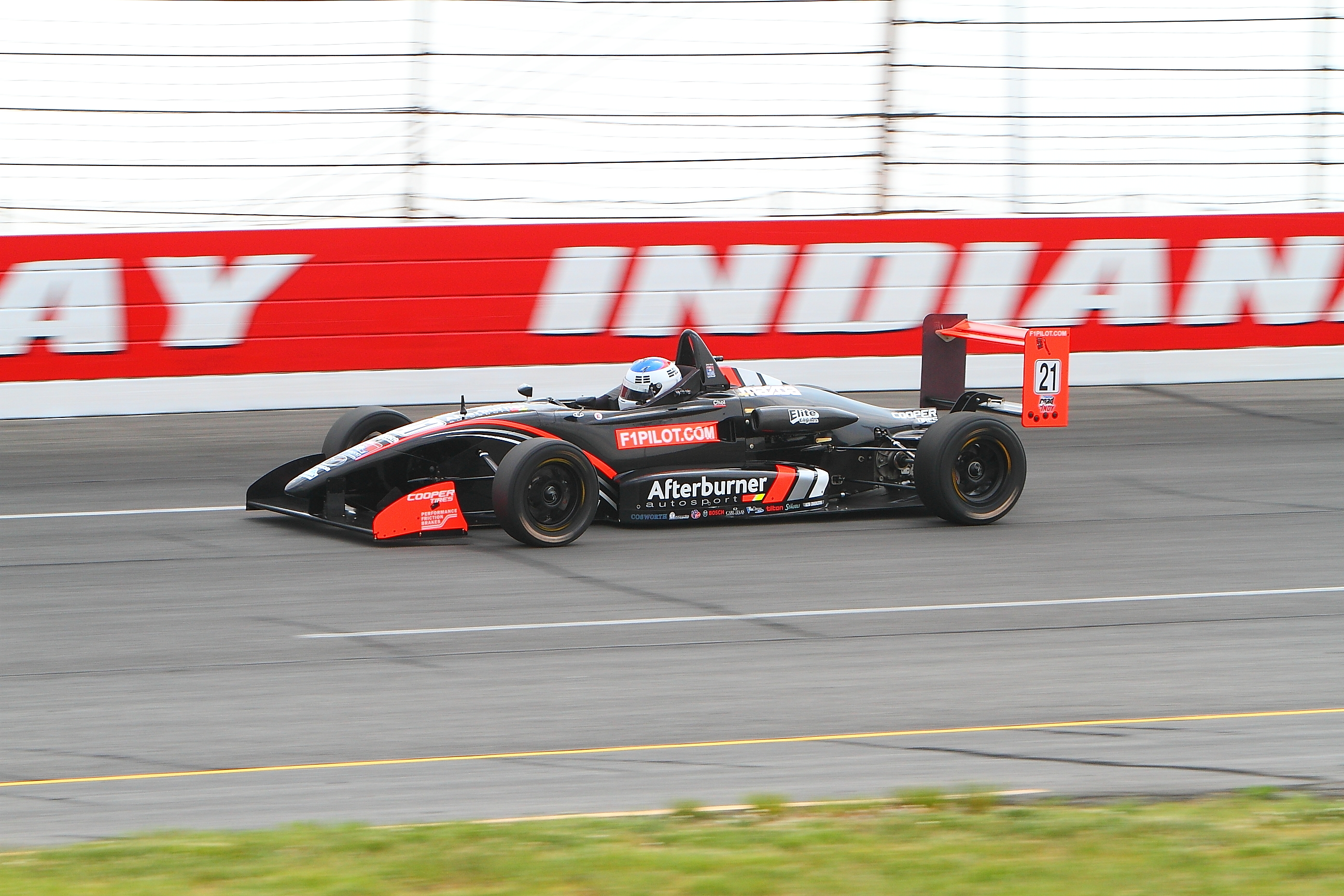
Driver Heamin Choi at Lucas Oil Raceway in 2012

Series logo from 2010-2022.

Series logo from 2023.

For 2010, the U.S. F2000 National Championship returned under the leadership of Dan Andersen, who then owned professional racing teams in Star Mazda and Indy Lights. The intent was to return F2000 to its status as a stepping stone to higher calibers of professional open wheel racing in the United States. The car rule package includes two sub-classes: the Championship class required an Elán/Van Diemen chassis with a league mandated aerodynamics package, and a sealed Mazda MZR engine.

In 2017, the series introduced the Tatuus USF-17, a full carbon monocoque chassis built to the latest FIA F3 test specifications, a significant technology leap over the previous Van Diemen steel tubular chassis. It uses the same Mazda MZR 2.0-liter naturally aspirated engine with additional safety features.

The USF2000 champion receives a scholarship package from Mazda to advance to the USF Pro 2000 Championship Presented by Cooper Tires.

=== Timeline ===
1990s										2000s										2010s
90	91	92	93	94	95	96	97	98	99	00	01	02	03	04	05	06	07	08	09	10	11	12	13	14	15	16	17	18	19
USAC West				USAC National	US F2000 National Championship							Formula Ford 2000 Zetec									USF2000 (INDYCAR)
		USAC East		USAC National	US F2000 National Championship							Formula Ford 2000 Zetec									USF2000 (INDYCAR)
		American Continental			US F2000 National Championship							Formula Ford 2000 Zetec										USF2000 Winterfest

== Sub-championships ==
Throughout the years the USF2000 series featured a number of sub-championships competitors could be eligible for.

=== Oval Crown ===
In 1996 the series introduced the Road to Indy Oval Crown. Races at Walt Disney World Speedway, Pikes Peak International Raceway, Lowe's Motor Speedway and other ovals counted towards the Oval Crown. The championship was continued until the 2002 season.

=== American Continental Championship ===
Named after the former SCCA F2000 series, the American Continental Championship, was introduced in 1999. The second tier class was open for Formula Ford 2000 cars manufactured between 1990 and 1996 and also Van Diemen chassis built in 1997. The class continued until the 2003 season. As only three drivers competed the class in 2003, the class was dropped for 2004.

=== National class ===
With the re-introduction of USF2000 in 2010, the National class was introduced. For 2010 and 2011 the national class was open to every Formula Continental spec car. For 2012 and 2013 the Formula Continental cars were outlawed. The cars allowed were the SCCA Formula Enterprises cars. The Formula Enterprises had their own pro series in 2010 and 2011, a number of the cars joined the USF2000 field for 2012. For 2012 and 2013 the Formula Enterprises cars were not allowed at Indianapolis Raceway Park. Due to low car counts, the National Class was discontinued for 2014 and 2015. The class returned in 2016, open to all Sports Car Club of America-legal FC (Formula Continental) cars, from any chassis manufacturer, dating back to 2000. With the introduction of the new Tatuus chassis in 2017, the National class was slated to be for Van Diemen cars conforming to the prior Championship Class spec. However, the first weekend only saw a single National class entry and the class was subsequently abandoned.

== Cars ==
Ford Pinto
Displacement	2.000cc
Valvetrain	SOHC
Bore	90.84mm
Stroke	76.95mm
Carburetor	Weber DGV or DGAV
hp	150+
Ford Zetec ZX3
Displacement	2.000cc
Valvetrain	DOHC
Bore	
Stroke	
Carburetor	
hp	160+
Mazda MZR
Displacement	2.000cc
Valvetrain	DOHC
Bore	
Stroke	
Carburetor	
hp	175

=== pre-2010 ===
The original USF2000 series was not a spec series as it is today. The cars were first built to SCCA Formula Continental specifications. The cars, constructed by a wide variety of manufacturers, all had a spaceframe chassis. The car featured aluminium bodywork and aerodynamic aides such as a front- and rear-wing. Until 2002 the cars were fitted with Ford Pinto engines, coded NEA. It was a naturally aspirated engine with a 2.000cc capacity. The engine had a SOHC valvetrain. Most of the parts were production Ford parts of the engine found in the Ford Escort RS2000. The manual gearbox had a maximum of four forward gears. The engines were built by various companies such as Quicksilver Racengines and Elite Engines. Different spec tires were used throughout the years. In the early 2000s Yokohama tires were used.

==== Zetec era ====
For 2002 the Ford Zetec engine was introduced to the series. Quicksilver Racengines and Elite Engines were selected as the only engine builders for the series. The engine came out of the first generation Ford Focus. The engine was strictly regulated and spec.

=== Van Diemen DP08 ===
For the relaunch in 2010 Van Diemen was selected as the supplier of the spec chassis for the series. Initially the car was named the Van Diemen DP08 the car was renamed Élan DP08 after Van Diemen was fully integrated into the latter. The car was initially designed to compete in the SCCA Formula Continental ranks but was heavily upgraded to run in the USF2000 series. The upgrades included a stronger steel spaceframe, improved side crashboxes and new brakes. Elite Engines was selected as the sole engine builder for the series. The company headed by former driver Steve Knapp builds the engines before shipping them to the Andersen Promotions headquarters.

=== Tatuus USF-17 ===
In 2016, at the 100th running of the Indianapolis 500, the new car for the 2017 U.S. F2000 National Championship was unveiled. Italian company Tatuus designed and built the USF-17. For the first time in series history the car featured a carbon fiber monocoque, opposed to the previously used spaceframe chassis. The car was based on the Tatuus designed F4-T014 FIA Formula 4 car. The engine basically remained the same but was now connected to a Cosworth SQ6 engine control unit. Sadev provides the six-speed sequential gearbox. The USF-17 can be upgraded to the PM-18 to compete in the Indy Pro 2000 Championship.

== Champions ==
Year		USAC West	USAC East	American Continental
1990 West		(United States) Vince Puleo, Jr.		
1991 West		(United States) Craig Taylor		
1992	West	(Canada) Greg Moore	(United States) Chris Simmons	(United States) Greg Ray
1992	East	(Canada) Greg Moore	(United States) Chris Simmons	(United States) Greg Ray
1992	ACC	(Canada) Greg Moore	(United States) Chris Simmons	(United States) Greg Ray
1993	West	(United States) David DeSilva	(United States) Chris Simmons	(United States) Ernest Sikes
1993	East	(United States) David DeSilva	(United States) Chris Simmons	(United States) Ernest Sikes
1993	ACC	(United States) David DeSilva	(United States) Chris Simmons	(United States) Ernest Sikes
1994	Nat	(United States) Clay Collier		(United States) Mike Borkowski
1994	ACC	(United States) Clay Collier		(United States) Mike Borkowski

=== Unified championship ===
Season	Champion	B-Division	Oval Crown	Eastern States Triple Crown	Western States Triple Crown
1995	(United States) Jeret Schroeder	(United States) Jon Groom			
1996	(United States) Steve Knapp	(United States) Jon Groom	(United States) Allen May	(United States) Steve Knapp	(Australia) Jason Bright
1997	(Brazil) Zak Morioka		(Brazil) Zak Morioka		
1998	(Australia) David Besnard		(Australia) David Besnard		
1999	(United Kingdom) Dan Wheldon				
2000	(United States) Aaron Justus	(United States) Tom Dyer			
2001	(United States) Jason Lapoint	(United States) Scott Rubenzer			
2002	(United States) Bryan Sellers	(United States) Kip Meeks			
2003	(United States) Jonathan Bomarito	(United States) Chris Dona			
2004	(United States) Bobby Wilson	(United States) Greg Pizzo			
2005	(United Kingdom) Jay Howard				
2006	(United States) J. R. Hildebrand				
2007–2009, series not held		Team Champion	National class	Winterfest	Winterfest National class
2010	(United States) Sage Karam	(United States) Andretti Autosport	(United States) Ardie Greenameyer		
2011 (W)	(Finland) Petri Suvanto	(United States) Andretti Autosport	(United States) Luca Forgeois	(United States) Zach Veach	
2012 (W)	(Australia) Matthew Brabham	(United States) Cape Motorsports	(Norway) Henrik Furuseth	(United States) Spencer Pigot	(Canada) James Dayson
2013 (W)	(Canada) Scott Hargrove	(United States) Cape Motorsports	(United States) Scott Rettich	(United States) Neil Alberico	(Canada) James Dayson
2014 (W)	(France) Florian Latorre	(United States) Cape Motorsports		(United States) R. C. Enerson	
2015 (W)	(France) Nico Jamin	(United States) Cape Motorsports		(France) Nico Jamin	
2016	(Australia) Anthony Martin	(United States) Cape Motorsports	(United States) Eric Filgueiras		
2017	(United States) Oliver Askew	(United States) Pabst Racing Services			
2018	(United States) Kyle Kirkwood	(United States) Pabst Racing Services			
2019	(United States) Braden Eves	(United States) Pabst Racing Services			
2020	(Denmark) Christian Rasmussen	(United States) Cape Motorsports			
2021	(Brazil) Kiko Porto	(United States) DEForce Racing			
2022	(United States) Michael d'Orlando	(United States) Pabst Racing			
2023	(United States) Simon Sikes	(United States) Pabst Racing			
2024	(United States) Max Garcia	(United States) Pabst Racing			
2025	(United States) Jack Jeffers	(United States) VRD Racing			
2026	(Colombia) Sebastián Garzón	(United States) Pabst Racing			

=== Constructors championship ===
Between 1997 and 2002 a constructors championship was contested. Only constructors who were Associate Members of the USF2000 championship were eligible to score points.

Constructor	Years active	1997	1998	1999	2000	2001	2002
Van Diemen	1990-2006	1	1	1	1	1	1
Tatuus	1997-2001, 2017–	2	2	4	N.C.^{1}	N.C.^{1}	
Mygale	1999-2003			2	3	3	2
Bowman	1998-1999		3	4			
Vector	2000				4		
Carbir	1999-2001			2	2	2	
Nemesis	1997	3					
Swift	1997	4			N.C.^{1}		
Constructors active in USF2000 in years without a constructors championship
Fast	1990						
Reynard	1990-1996; 2010						
Élan	2010–2016						
SCCA Enterprises	2012-2013						

^1 These manufacturers were not Associate Members of the USF2000 championship and thus were not eligible to score points.

== See also ==
- Formula Ford
- F2000 Championship Series
