= 2025 GT4 America Series =

Motor racing competition

The 2025 Pirelli GT4 America Series was the seventh season of the GT4 America Series. The season began on April 7 at Sonoma Raceway and finished on October 18 at Indianapolis Motor Speedway.

== Calendar ==
The preliminary calendar was released on June 28, 2024, featuring 13 races across seven rounds.

Race is an Endurance Round

| Round | Circuit | Date | Map |
|---|---|---|---|
| 1 | Sonoma Raceway, Sonoma, California | March 28–30 | 2025 GT4 America Series is located in the United States |
| 2 | Circuit of the Americas, Austin, Texas | April 25–27 | 2025 GT4 America Series is located in the United States |
| 3 | Sebring International Raceway, Sebring, Florida | May 16–18 | 2025 GT4 America Series is located in the United States |
| 4 | Virginia International Raceway, Alton, Virginia | July 18–20 | 2025 GT4 America Series is located in the United States |
| 5 | Road America, Elkhart Lake, Wisconsin | August 15–17 | 2025 GT4 America Series is located in the United States |
| 6 | Barber Motorsports Park, Birmingham, Alabama | September 5–7 | 2025 GT4 America Series is located in the United States |
| 7 | Indianapolis Motor Speedway, Indianapolis, Indiana | October 16–18 | 2025 GT4 America Series is located in the United States |

== Entry list ==
| Team | Car | Engine | No. | Drivers | Class | Rounds |
|---|---|---|---|---|---|---|
| (United States) Skip Barber Racing | Aston Martin Vantage AMR GT4 1–6; BMW M4 GT4 (G82) 7 | Aston Martin M177 4.0 L Turbo V8 1–6; BMW S58B30T0 3.0 L Twin Turbo I6 7 | 07 | (United States) Alex Garcia | Am | All |
| (United States) Skip Barber Racing | Aston Martin Vantage AMR GT4 1–6; BMW M4 GT4 (G82) 7 | Aston Martin M177 4.0 L Turbo V8 1–6; BMW S58B30T0 3.0 L Twin Turbo I6 7 | 07 | (United States) Michael Garcia | Am | All |
| (United States) ProSport Competition | Aston Martin Vantage AMR GT4 | Aston Martin M177 4.0 L Turbo V8 | 007 | (United States) Tim Savage | Am | 2–3 |
| (United States) ProSport Competition | Aston Martin Vantage AMR GT4 | Aston Martin M177 4.0 L Turbo V8 | 007 | (United States) Dwayne Moses | Am | 2 |
| (United States) ProSport Competition | Aston Martin Vantage AMR GT4 | Aston Martin M177 4.0 L Turbo V8 | 007 | (United States) Christopher Lee | Am | 3 |
| (United States) 89x Motorsports | Aston Martin Vantage AMR GT4 | Aston Martin M177 4.0 L Turbo V8 | 09 | (United States) John Dean | PA | 4 |
| (United States) 89x Motorsports | Aston Martin Vantage AMR GT4 | Aston Martin M177 4.0 L Turbo V8 | 09 | (United States) Michael Fitzpatrick | PA | 4 |
| (Canada) JMF Motorsports | Aston Martin Vantage AMR GT4 Evo | Aston Martin M177 4.0 L Turbo V8 | 3 | (Canada) Jonathan Neudorf | S | All |
| (Canada) JMF Motorsports | Aston Martin Vantage AMR GT4 Evo | Aston Martin M177 4.0 L Turbo V8 | 3 | (Canada) Jesse Webb | S | All |
| (Canada) JMF Motorsports | Aston Martin Vantage AMR GT4 Evo | Aston Martin M177 4.0 L Turbo V8 | 4 | (Canada) Braydon Arthur | S | All |
| (Canada) JMF Motorsports | Aston Martin Vantage AMR GT4 Evo | Aston Martin M177 4.0 L Turbo V8 | 4 | (Germany) Mike David Ortmann | S | All |
| (United States) ACI Motorsports | Porsche 718 Cayman GT4 RS Clubsport | Porsche MDG 4.0 L Flat-6 | 7 | (United States) Riley Dickinson | PA | All |
| (United States) ACI Motorsports | Porsche 718 Cayman GT4 RS Clubsport | Porsche MDG 4.0 L Flat-6 | 7 | (United States) Curt Swearingin | PA | All |
| (United States) ACI Motorsports | Porsche 718 Cayman GT4 RS Clubsport | Porsche MDG 4.0 L Flat-6 | 9 | (United States) Dan Sibille | PA | 1–3, 5–7 |
| (United States) ACI Motorsports | Porsche 718 Cayman GT4 RS Clubsport | Porsche MDG 4.0 L Flat-6 | 9 | (Netherlands) Loek Hartog | PA | 1, 5–7 |
| (United States) ACI Motorsports | Porsche 718 Cayman GT4 RS Clubsport | Porsche MDG 4.0 L Flat-6 | 9 | (Netherlands) Kay van Berlo | PA | 2–3 |
| (United States) ACI Motorsports | Porsche 718 Cayman GT4 RS Clubsport | Porsche MDG 4.0 L Flat-6 | 25 | (Canada) Damir Hot | PA | 4 |
| (United States) ACI Motorsports | Porsche 718 Cayman GT4 RS Clubsport | Porsche MDG 4.0 L Flat-6 | 25 | (New Zealand) Ryan Yardley | PA | 4 |
| (United States) OGH Motorsports | McLaren Artura GT4 | McLaren M630 3.0 L Turbo V6 | 10 | (United States) Sean Gibbons | Am | 1–5, 7 |
| (United States) OGH Motorsports | McLaren Artura GT4 | McLaren M630 3.0 L Turbo V6 | 10 | (United States) Sam Owen | Am | 1–5, 7 |
| (United States) Riley Technologies | Porsche 718 Cayman GT4 RS Clubsport | Porsche MDG 4.0 L Flat-6 | 12 | (United States) Eric Filgueiras | S | 7 |
| (United States) Riley Technologies | Porsche 718 Cayman GT4 RS Clubsport | Porsche MDG 4.0 L Flat-6 | 12 | (United States) Spencer Pumpelly | S | 7 |
| (United States) Archangel Motorsports | Aston Martin Vantage AMR GT4 Evo | Aston Martin M177 4.0 L Turbo V8 | 15 | (United States) Adrian Comstock | PA | 1–3 |
| (United States) Archangel Motorsports | Aston Martin Vantage AMR GT4 Evo | Aston Martin M177 4.0 L Turbo V8 | 15 | (United States) Thomas Merrill | PA | 1–3 |
| (United States) Rigid Speed Company | BMW M4 GT4 (G82) | BMW S58B30T0 3.0 L Twin Turbo I6 | 17 | (United States) Joseph Catania | Am | 1–5, 7 |
| (United States) Rigid Speed Company | BMW M4 GT4 (G82) | BMW S58B30T0 3.0 L Twin Turbo I6 | 17 | (United States) Lucas Catania | Am | 1–5, 7 |
| (United States) FastMD Racing with Remstar Racing | Audi R8 LMS GT4 | Audi DAR 5.2 L V10 | 20 | (United States) Farhan Siddiqi | PA (Note: The No. 20 car was classed as an invitational entry and was not eligible to score points.) | 3 |
| (United States) FastMD Racing with Remstar Racing | Audi R8 LMS GT4 | Audi DAR 5.2 L V10 | 20 | (United States) Jagger Jones | PA | 3 |
| (United States) Lone Star Racing | Mercedes-AMG GT4 | Mercedes-AMG M178 4.0 L V8 | 22 | (United States) Marc Austin | Am | 2 |
| (United States) Lone Star Racing | Mercedes-AMG GT4 | Mercedes-AMG M178 4.0 L V8 | 22 | (United States) Jason Golan | Am | 2 |
| (United States) NOLASport | Porsche 718 Cayman GT4 RS Clubsport | Porsche MDG 4.0 L Flat-6 | 23 | (United States) Michael Auriemma | PA | 1–6 |
| (United States) NOLASport | Porsche 718 Cayman GT4 RS Clubsport | Porsche MDG 4.0 L Flat-6 | 23 | (Brazil) Matheus Leist | PA | 1–6 |
| (United States) Heart of Racing Team | Aston Martin Vantage AMR GT4 Evo | Aston Martin M177 4.0 L Turbo V8 | 26 | (United States) Hannah Grisham | S | All |
| (United States) Heart of Racing Team | Aston Martin Vantage AMR GT4 Evo | Aston Martin M177 4.0 L Turbo V8 | 26 | (United States) Hannah Greenemeier | S | All |
| (United States) Fast Track Racing | BMW M4 GT4 Evo (G82) | BMW S58B30T0 3.0 L Twin Turbo I6 | 28 | (United States) Nate Cicero | PA | 1–5 |
| (United States) Fast Track Racing | BMW M4 GT4 Evo (G82) | BMW S58B30T0 3.0 L Twin Turbo I6 | 28 | (United Kingdom) Stuart McAleer | PA | 1–5 |
| (United States) Fast Track Racing | BMW M4 GT4 Evo (G82) | BMW S58B30T0 3.0 L Twin Turbo I6 | 188 | (United States) Judson Holt | Am | All |
| (United States) Fast Track Racing | BMW M4 GT4 Evo (G82) | BMW S58B30T0 3.0 L Twin Turbo I6 | 188 | (United States) Denny Stripling | Am | 3–7 |
| (United States) Fast Track Racing | BMW M4 GT4 Evo (G82) | BMW S58B30T0 3.0 L Twin Turbo I6 | 188 | (United States) Dave Ogburn | Am | 1–2 |
| (United States) Blackdog Speed Shop | McLaren Artura GT4 | McLaren M630 3.0 L Turbo V6 | 33 | (United States) Michael Cooper | PA | All |
| (United States) Blackdog Speed Shop | McLaren Artura GT4 | McLaren M630 3.0 L Turbo V6 | 33 | (United States) Tony Gaples | PA | All |
| (United States) Bimmerworld Racing | BMW M4 GT4 Evo (G82) | BMW S58B30T0 3.0 L Twin Turbo I6 | 36 | (United States) James Clay | Am | All |
| (United States) Bimmerworld Racing | BMW M4 GT4 Evo (G82) | BMW S58B30T0 3.0 L Twin Turbo I6 | 36 | (United States) Charlie Postins | Am | All |
| (United States) Bimmerworld Racing | BMW M4 GT4 Evo (G82) | BMW S58B30T0 3.0 L Twin Turbo I6 | 82 | (United States) Tyler McQuarrie | PA | All |
| (United States) Bimmerworld Racing | BMW M4 GT4 Evo (G82) | BMW S58B30T0 3.0 L Twin Turbo I6 | 82 | (United States) James Walker Jr. | PA | All |
| (United States) Dome Motorsport | Mercedes-AMG GT4 | Mercedes-AMG M178 4.0 L V8 | 37 | (United States) Marc Miller | PA 1–3, 5–7; S 4 | All |
| (United States) Dome Motorsport | Mercedes-AMG GT4 | Mercedes-AMG M178 4.0 L V8 | 37 | (United States) Eddie Killeen | PA 1–3, 5–7; S 4 | 1–3, 5–7 |
| (United States) Dome Motorsport | Mercedes-AMG GT4 | Mercedes-AMG M178 4.0 L V8 | 37 | (United States) Nate Cicero | PA 1–3, 5–7; S 4 | 4 |
| (United States) Van der Steur Racing | Aston Martin Vantage AMR GT4 Evo 3 Aston Martin Vantage AMR GT4 4–7 | Aston Martin M177 4.0 L Turbo V8 | 39 | (United States) Max Hewitt | S | 3–7 |
| (United States) Van der Steur Racing | Aston Martin Vantage AMR GT4 Evo 3 Aston Martin Vantage AMR GT4 4–7 | Aston Martin M177 4.0 L Turbo V8 | 39 | (United States) Luca Mars | S | 3–7 |
| (United States) P1 Groupe | McLaren Artura GT4 | McLaren M630 3.0 L Turbo V6 | 43 | (United States) Matt Bell | PA | 1–6 |
| (United States) P1 Groupe | McLaren Artura GT4 | McLaren M630 3.0 L Turbo V6 | 43 | (United States) Alex Vogel | PA | 1–6 |
| (United States) Driven Artists Racing Team by TPC | McLaren Artura GT4 | McLaren M630 3.0 L Turbo V6 | 44 | (United States) Zoe Barry | PA | 1 |
| (United States) Driven Artists Racing Team by TPC | McLaren Artura GT4 | McLaren M630 3.0 L Turbo V6 | 44 | (United States) Aurora Straus | PA | 1 |
| (United States) Auto Technic Racing | BMW M4 GT4 Evo (G82) | BMW S58B30T0 3.0 L Twin Turbo I6 | 52 | (United States) Zac Anderson | S | 1–5 |
| (United States) Auto Technic Racing | BMW M4 GT4 Evo (G82) | BMW S58B30T0 3.0 L Twin Turbo I6 | 52 | (United States) Colin Garett | S | 1–5 |
| (United States) Auto Technic Racing | BMW M4 GT4 Evo (G82) | BMW S58B30T0 3.0 L Twin Turbo I6 | 52 | (United States) Gafurov Muzaffar | Am | 7 |
| (United States) Auto Technic Racing | BMW M4 GT4 Evo (G82) | BMW S58B30T0 3.0 L Twin Turbo I6 | 52 | (United States) Ross Poole | Am | 7 |
| (United States) Auto Technic Racing | BMW M4 GT4 Evo (G82) | BMW S58B30T0 3.0 L Twin Turbo I6 | 53 | (United States) Matt Million | PA | All |
| (United States) Auto Technic Racing | BMW M4 GT4 Evo (G82) | BMW S58B30T0 3.0 L Twin Turbo I6 | 53 | (United States) Tyler Stone | PA | All |
| (United States) RAFA Racing Team | Toyota GR Supra GT4 Evo2 | BMW B58B30 3.0 L Twin-Turbo I6 | 68 | (United States) Tyler Gonzalez | S | All |
| (United States) RAFA Racing Team | Toyota GR Supra GT4 Evo2 | BMW B58B30 3.0 L Twin-Turbo I6 | 68 | (United States) Gresham Wagner | S | All |
| (United States) RAFA Racing Team | Toyota GR Supra GT4 Evo 1–4; Toyota GR Supra GT4 Evo2 5–7 | BMW B58B30 3.0 L Twin-Turbo I6 | 72 | (United States) Anthony Geraci | Am | All |
| (United States) RAFA Racing Team | Toyota GR Supra GT4 Evo 1–4; Toyota GR Supra GT4 Evo2 5–7 | BMW B58B30 3.0 L Twin-Turbo I6 | 72 | (United States) Kenny Schmied | Am | All |
| (United States) JTR Motorsports | Toyota GR Supra GT4 Evo2 | BMW B58B30 3.0 L Twin-Turbo I6 | 69 | (United States) Anthony McIntosh | PA | 1–4 |
| (United States) JTR Motorsports | Toyota GR Supra GT4 Evo2 | BMW B58B30 3.0 L Twin-Turbo I6 | 69 | (Canada) Parker Thompson | PA | 1–4 |
| (United States) Marco Polo Motorsports | Toyota GR Supra GT4 Evo2 | BMW B58B30 3.0 L Twin-Turbo I6 | 71 | (United States) Nicolai Elghanayan | S | 1–2, 4–6 |
| (United States) Marco Polo Motorsports | Toyota GR Supra GT4 Evo2 | BMW B58B30 3.0 L Twin-Turbo I6 | 71 | (Norway) Mads Emil Siljehaug | S | 1–2, 4–6 |
| (Canada) VPX Motorsport | Porsche 718 Cayman GT4 RS Clubsport | Porsche MDG 4.0 L Flat-6 | 77 | (United States) Danny Dyszelski | S | All |
| (Canada) VPX Motorsport | Porsche 718 Cayman GT4 RS Clubsport | Porsche MDG 4.0 L Flat-6 | 77 | (Canada) Alex Ellis | S | All |
| (United States) Random Vandals Racing | BMW M4 GT4 Evo (G82) | BMW S58B30T0 3.0 L Twin Turbo I6 | 94 | (United States) Sam Craven | PA | All |
| (United States) Random Vandals Racing | BMW M4 GT4 Evo (G82) | BMW S58B30T0 3.0 L Twin Turbo I6 | 94 | (United States) Josh Green | PA | All |
| (United States) Random Vandals Racing | BMW M4 GT4 Evo (G82) | BMW S58B30T0 3.0 L Twin Turbo I6 | 98 | (United States) Paul Sparta | Am | All |
| (United States) Random Vandals Racing | BMW M4 GT4 Evo (G82) | BMW S58B30T0 3.0 L Twin Turbo I6 | 98 | (United States) Mike Kanisczak | Am | 1–6 |
| (United States) Random Vandals Racing | BMW M4 GT4 Evo (G82) | BMW S58B30T0 3.0 L Twin Turbo I6 | 98 | (United States) Darius Trinka | Am | 7 |
| (United States) CrowdStrike Racing by Random Vandals | BMW M4 GT4 Evo (G82) | BMW S58B30T0 3.0 L Twin Turbo I6 | 97 | (United States) Kevin Boehm | S | All |
| (United States) CrowdStrike Racing by Random Vandals | BMW M4 GT4 Evo (G82) | BMW S58B30T0 3.0 L Twin Turbo I6 | 97 | (United States) Kenton Koch | S | All |
| (United States) Flying Lizard Motorsports | BMW M4 GT4 (G82) | BMW S58B30T0 3.0 L Twin Turbo I6 | 413 | (United States) Zach Lumsden | Am | 4, 7 |
| (United States) Flying Lizard Motorsports | BMW M4 GT4 (G82) | BMW S58B30T0 3.0 L Twin Turbo I6 | 413 | (United States) Kris Wilson | Am | 4, 7 |
| (United States) Flying Lizard Motorsports | BMW M4 GT4 (G82) | BMW S58B30T0 3.0 L Twin Turbo I6 | 413 | (United States) Craig Lumsden | Am | 4 (Note: Craig participated in the practice setions for round 4 at VIR, but was replaced prior to qualifying by Kris Wilson for the remainder of the weekend.) |
| (United States) Thunder Bunny Racing | Toyota GR Supra GT4 Evo2 | BMW B58B30 3.0 L Twin-Turbo I6 | 606 | (United States) Laura Hayes | Am | 1–4 |
| (United States) Thunder Bunny Racing | Toyota GR Supra GT4 Evo2 | BMW B58B30 3.0 L Twin-Turbo I6 | 606 | (United States) Allen Patten | Am | 1–4 |
| (United States) Thunder Bunny Racing | BMW M4 GT4 Evo (G82) | BMW S58B30T0 3.0 L Twin Turbo I6 | 606 | (United States) Laura Hayes | Am | 5–6 |
| (United States) Thunder Bunny Racing | BMW M4 GT4 Evo (G82) | BMW S58B30T0 3.0 L Twin Turbo I6 | 606 | (United States) Allen Patten | Am | 5–6 |

| Icon | Class |
|---|---|
| S | Silver Cup |
| PA | Pro-Am Cup |
| Am | Am Cup |

== Race results ==
Bold indicates overall winner

| Round | | Circuit | Pole position | Silver Winners | Pro/Am Winners | Am Winners | Results |
|---|---|---|---|---|---|---|---|
| 1 | R1 | (California) Sonoma | (United States) #71 Marco Polo Motorsports | **(United States) #52 Auto Technic Racing** | (United States) #33 Blackdog Speed Shop | (United States) #72 RAFA Racing Team | Report |
| 1 | R1 | (California) Sonoma | (United States) Nicolai Elghanayan (Norway) Mads Emil Siljehaug | **(United States) Zac Anderson** **(United States) Colin Garett** | (United States) Michael Cooper (United States) Tony Gaples | (United States) Anthony Geraci (United States) Kenny Schmied | Report |
| 1 | R2 | (California) Sonoma | (United States) #23 NOLASPORT | **(United States) #97 CrowdStrike Racing by Random Vandals** | (United States) #94 Random Vandals Racing | (United States) #07 Skip Barber Racing | Report |
| 1 | R2 | (California) Sonoma | (United States) Michael Auriemma (Brazil) Matheus Leist | **(United States) Kevin Boehm** **(United States) Kenton Koch** | (United States) Sam Craven (United States) Josh Green | (United States) Alex Garcia (United States) Michael Garcia | Report |
| 2 | 3H | (Texas) Austin | (United States) #69 JTR Motorsports | (United States) **#68 RAFA Racing Team** | (United States) #82 Bimmerworld Racing | (United States) #36 Bimmerworld Racing | Report |
| 2 | 3H | (Texas) Austin | (United States) Anthony McIntosh (Canada) Parker Thompson | (United States) **Tyler Gonzalez** (United States) **Gresham Wagner** | (United States) Tyler McQuarrie (United States) James Walker Jr. | (United States) James Clay (United States) Charlie Postins | Report |
| 3 | R1 | (Florida) Sebring | (United States) #9 ACI Motorsports | **(United States) #97 CrowdStrike Racing by Random Vandals** | (United States) #94 Random Vandals Racing | (United States) #36 Bimmerworld Racing | Report |
| 3 | R1 | (Florida) Sebring | (United States) Dan Sibille (Netherlands) Kay van Berlo | **(United States) Kevin Boehm** **(United States) Kenton Koch** | (United States) Sam Craven (United States) Josh Green | (United States) James Clay (United States) Charlie Postins | Report |
| 3 | R2 | (Florida) Sebring | (United States) #39 Van der Steur Racing | **(United States) #97 CrowdStrike Racing by Random Vandals** | (United States) #94 Random Vandals Racing | (United States) #36 Bimmerworld Racing | Report |
| 3 | R2 | (Florida) Sebring | (United States) Max Hewitt (United States) Luca Mars | **(United States) Kevin Boehm** **(United States) Kenton Koch** | (United States) Sam Craven (United States) Josh Green | (United States) James Clay (United States) Charlie Postins | Report |
| 4 | R1 | Virginia | (United States) #37 Dome Motorsport | **(United States) #97 CrowdStrike Racing by Random Vandals** | (United States) #94 Random Vandals Racing | (United States) #36 Bimmerworld Racing | Report |
| 4 | R1 | Virginia | (United States) Nate Cicero (United States) Marc Miller | **(United States) Kevin Boehm** **(United States) Kenton Koch** | (United States) Sam Craven (United States) Josh Green | (United States) James Clay (United States) Charlie Postins | Report |
| 4 | R2 | Virginia | (Canada) #77 VPX Motorsport | **(United States) #97 CrowdStrike Racing by Random Vandals** | (United States) #94 Random Vandals Racing | (United States) #413 Flying Lizard Motorsports | Report |
| 4 | R2 | Virginia | (United States) Danny Dyszelski (Canada) Alex Ellis | **(United States) Kevin Boehm** **(United States) Kenton Koch** | (United States) Sam Craven (United States) Josh Green | (United States) Craig Lumsden (United States) Kris Wilson | Report |
| 5 | R1 | (Wisconsin) Road America | (United States) #7 ACI Motorsports | **(United States) #97 CrowdStrike Racing by Random Vandals** | (United States) #7 ACI Motorsports | (United States) #98 Random Vandals Racing | Report |
| 5 | R1 | (Wisconsin) Road America | (United States) Riley Dickinson (United States) Curt Swearingin | **(United States) Kevin Boehm** **(United States) Kenton Koch** | (United States) Riley Dickinson (United States) Curt Swearingin | (United States) Paul Sparta (United States) Mike Kanisczak | Report |
| 5 | R2 | (Wisconsin) Road America | (United States) #68 RAFA Racing Team | **(Canada) #4 JMF Motorsports** | (United States) #7 ACI Motorsports | (United States) #17 Rigid Speed Company | Report |
| 5 | R2 | (Wisconsin) Road America | (United States) Tyler Gonzalez (United States) Gresham Wagner | **(Canada) Braydon Arthur** **(Germany) Mike David Ortmann** | (United States) Riley Dickinson (United States) Curt Swearingin | (United States) Joseph Catania (United States) Lucas Catania | Report |
| 6 | R1 | (Alabama) Barber | (United States) #43 P1 Groupe | (United States) #97 CrowdStrike Racing by Random Vandals | **(United States) #7 ACI Motorsports** | (United States) #98 Random Vandals Racing | Report |
| 6 | R1 | (Alabama) Barber | (United States) Matt Bell (United States) Alex Vogel | (United States) Kevin Boehm (United States) Kenton Koch | **(United States) Riley Dickinson** **(United States) Curt Swearingin** | (United States) Paul Sparta (United States) Mike Kanisczak | Report |
| 6 | R2 | (Alabama) Barber | (United States) #33 Blackdog Speed Shop | **(United States) #68 RAFA Racing Team** | (United States) #43 P1 Groupe | (United States) #606 Thunder Bunny Racing | Report |
| 6 | R2 | (Alabama) Barber | (United States) Michael Cooper (United States) Tony Gaples | **(United States) Tyler Gonzalez** **(United States) Gresham Wagner** | (United States) Matt Bell (United States) Alex Vogel | (United States) Laura Hayes (United States) Allen Patten | Report |
| 7 | R1 | (Indiana) Indianapolis | (United States) #33 Blackdog Speed Shop | **(United States) #68 RAFA Racing Team** | (United States) #33 Blackdog Speed Shop | (United States) #188 Fast Track Racing | Report |
| 7 | R1 | (Indiana) Indianapolis | (United States) Michael Cooper (United States) Tony Gaples | **(United States) Tyler Gonzalez** **(United States) Gresham Wagner** | (United States) Michael Cooper (United States) Tony Gaples | (United States) Laura Hayes (United States) Denny Stripling | Report |
| 8 | R2 | (Indiana) Indianapolis | (United States) #47 NOLASPORT | **(Canada) #4 JMF Motorsports** | (United States) #33 Blackdog Speed Shop | (United States) #72 RAFA Racing Team | Report |
| 8 | R2 | (Indiana) Indianapolis | (Brazil) Matheus Leist (United States) Matt Travis | **(Canada) Braydon Arthur** **(Germany) Mike David Ortmann** | (United States) Michael Cooper (United States) Tony Gaples | (United States) Judson Holt (United States) Kenny Schmied | Report |

== Championship standings ==
Points are awarded to the top ten finishers per class in each race.

| Position | | **1st** | **2nd** | **3rd** | **4th** | **5th** | **6th** | **7th** | **8th** | **9th** | **10th** |
| Points | 1 hour | 25 | 18 | 15 | 12 | 10 | 8 | 6 | 4 | 2 | 1 |
| Points | 3 hours | 50 | 36 | 30 | 24 | 20 | 16 | 12 | 8 | 4 | 2 |

=== Drivers' championship ===
| Pos. | Drivers | Team | SON | | COT | SEB | | VIR | | ELK | BAR | IND | Points |
Silver Cup
| 1 | (United States) Kevin Boehm (United States) Kenton Koch | (United States) CrowdStrike Racing by Random Vandals | 7 | 1 | 15 | 1 | 1 | 1 | 1 | | | | 163 |
| 2 | (United States) Tyler Gonzalez (United States) Gresham Wagner | (United States) RAFA Racing Team | 22† | 2 | 1 | 5 | 3 | 3 | 11 | | | | 131 |
| 3 | (United States) Zac Anderson (United States) Colin Garett | (United States) Auto Technic Racing | 1 | 7 | 17 | 4 | 4 | 5 | 5 | | | | 101 |
| 4 | (Canada) Braydon Arthur (Germany) Mike David Ortmann | (Canada) JMF Motorsports | 8 | 4 | 7 | 10 | 27 | 10 | 6 | | | | 96 |
| 5 | (United States) Danny Dyszelski (Canada) Alex Ellis | (Canada) VPX Motorsport | 27 | 5 | 25† | 9 | 5 | 4 | **4** | | | | 73 |
| 6 | (United States) Hannah Grisham (United States) Hannah Greenemeier | (United States) Heart of Racing Team | 14 | 12 | 8 | 15 | 11 | 15 | 24 | | | | 66 |
| 7 | (Canada) Jonathan Neudorf (Canada) Jesse Webb | (Canada) JMF Motorsports | 24 | 6 | 12 | 26 | 10 | 12 | 27 | | | | 57 |
| 8 | (United States) Nate Cicero (United States) Marc Miller | (United States) Dome Motorsport | | | | | | **2** | 3 | | | | 36 |
| 9 | (United States) Max Hewitt (United States) Luca Mars | (United States) Van der Steur Racing | | | | 3 | **7** | 11 | 25 | | | | 36 |
| 10 | (United States) Nicolai Elghanayan (Norway) Mads Emil Siljehaug | (United States) Marco Polo Motorsports | **23** | 19 | 19 | | | 27 | 22 | | | | 31 |
Pro-Am Cup
| 1 | (United States) Sam Craven (United States) Josh Green | (United States) Random Vandals Racing | 9 | 3 | 18 | 2 | 2 | 6 | 2 | | | | 141 |
| 2 | (United States) Tyler McQuarrie (United States) James Walker Jr. | (United States) Bimmerworld Racing | 3 | 13 | 2 | 11 | 9 | 9 | 8 | | | | 132 |
| 3 | (United States) Michael Cooper (United States) Tony Gaples | (United States) Blackdog Speed Shop | 2 | 24† | 4 | 7 | 6 | 16 | 7 | | | | 117 |
| 4 | (United States) Riley Dickinson (United States) Curt Swearingin | (United States) ACI Motorsports | 4 | 8 | 6 | 8 | 20 | 8 | 10 | | | | 97 |
| 5 | (United States) Anthony McIntosh (Canada) Parker Thompson | (United States) JTR Motorsports | 18 | 22 | **5** | 6 | 8 | WD | WD | | | | 62 |
| 6 | (United States) Michael Auriemma (Brazil) Matheus Leist | (United States) NOLASport | 5 | **18** | 10 | 28 | 15 | 20 | 9 | | | | 57 |
| 7 | (United States) Matt Million (United States) Tyler Stone | (United States) Auto Technic Racing | 25 | 9 | 9 | 29 | 18 | 13 | 13 | | | | 57 |
| 8 | (United States) Adrian Comstock (United States) Thomas Merrill | (United States) Archangel Motorsports | 6 | 25† | 3 | 13 | 26 | | | | | | 54 |
| 9 | (United States) Matt Bell (United States) Alex Vogel | (United States) P1 Groupe | 10 | 15 | 29 | 18 | 14 | 21 | 17 | | | | 38 |
| 10 | (United States) Nate Cicero (United Kingdom) Stuart McAleer | (United States) Fast Track Racing | 12 | 17 | 26 | WD | WD | WD | WD | | | | 14 |
| 11 | (United States) Eddie Killeen (United States) Marc Miller | (United States) Dome Motorsport | 19 | 23 | 27† | 17 | 21 | | | | | | 12 |
| 12 | (Canada) Damir Hot (New Zealand) Ryan Yardley | (United States) ACI Motorsports | | | | | | 18 | 23 | | | | 10 |
| 13 | (United States) John Dean (United States) Michael Fitzpatrick | (United States) 89x Motorsports | | | | | | 24 | 14 | | | | 8 |
| 14 | (United States) Dan Sibille | (United States) ACI Motorsports | 11 | 27 | 28 | **23** | 22 | | | | | | 7 |
| 15 | (Netherlands) Loek Hartog | (United States) ACI Motorsports | 11 | 27 | | | | | | | | | 4 |
| 16 | (Netherlands) Kay van Berlo | (United States) ACI Motorsports | | | 28 | **23** | 22 | | | | | | 3 |
Am Cup
| 1 | (United States) James Clay (United States) Charlie Postins | (United States) Bimmerworld Racing | 28 | 26 | 11 | 12 | 12 | 7 | 21 | | | | 141 |
| 2 | (United States) Anthony Geraci (United States) Kenny Schmied | (United States) RAFA Racing Team | 13 | 11 | 14 | 20 | 19 | 14 | 15 | | | | 129 |
| 3 | (United States) Judson Holt | (United States) Fast Track Racing | 15 | 16 | 13 | 16 | 16 | 23 | 19 | | | | 114 |
| 4 | (United States) Alex Garcia (United States) Michael Garcia | (United States) Skip Barber Racing | 21 | 10 | 23 | 19 | 17 | 22 | 18 | | | | 87 |
| 5 | (United States) Dave Ogburn | (United States) Fast Track Racing | 15 | 16 | 13 | | | | | | | | 66 |
| 6 | (United States) Paul Sparta (United States) Mike Kanisczak | (United States) Random Vandals Racing | 20 | 14 | 22 | 22 | 24 | 19 | 26 | | | | 65 |
| 7 | (United States) Joseph Catania (United States) Lucas Catania | (United States) Rigid Speed Company | 16 | 20 | | 21 | 28 | 17 | 16 | | | | 65 |
| 8 | (United States) Laura Hayes (United States) Allen Patten | (United States) Thunder Bunny Racing | 26 | DNS | 24† | 14 | 13 | 25 | 20 | | | | 60 |
| 9 | (United States) Denny Stripling | (United States) Fast Track Racing | | | | 16 | 16 | 23 | 19 | | | | 48 |
| 10 | (United States) Sean Gibbons (United States) Sam Owen | (United States) OGH Motorsports | 29 | 21 | 20 | 24 | 25 | WD | WD | | | | 38 |
| 11 | (United States) Zach Lumsden (United States) Kris Wilson | (United States) Flying Lizard Motorsports | | | | | | 26 | 12 | | | | 29 |
| 12 | (United States) Tim Savage | (United States) ProSport Competition | | | 21 | 25 | 23 | | | | | | 26 |
| 13 | (United States) Marc Austin (United States) Jason Golan | (United States) Lone Star Racing | | | 16 | | | | | | | | 24 |
| 14 | (United States) Dwayne Moses | (United States) ProSport Competition | | | 21 | | | | | | | | 16 |
| 15 | (United States) Zoe Barry (United States) Aurora Straus | (United States) Driven Artists Racing Team by TPC | 17 | DNS | | | | | | | | | 12 |
| 16 | (United States) Christopher Lee | (United States) ProSport Competition | | | | 25 | 23 | | | | | | 10 |
| — | (United States) Craig Lumsden | (United States) Flying Lizard Motorsports | | | | | | WD | WD | | | | — |
Guest drivers ineligible to score points
| — | (United States) Farhan Siddiqi (United States) Jagger Jones | (United States) FastMD Racing with Remstar Racing | | | | 27 | 29 | | | | | | — |
| Pos. | Drivers | Team | SON | | COT | SEB | | VIR | | ELK | BAR | IND | Points |

Key
| Colour | Result |
|---|---|
| Gold | Race winner |
| Silver | 2nd place |
| Bronze | 3rd place |
| Green | Points finish |
| Blue | Non-points finish |
| Blue | Non-classified finish (NC) |
| Purple | Did not finish (Ret) |
| Black | Disqualified (DSQ) |
| Black | Excluded (EX) |
| White | Did not start (DNS) |
| White | Race cancelled (C) |
| White | Withdrew (WD) |
| Blank | Did not participate |

**Bold** – Pole
Italics – Fastest Lap
† – Drivers did not finish the race but were classified, as they completed more than 75% of the race distance.

== See also ==
- 2025 British GT Championship
- 2025 GT4 European Series
- 2025 French GT4 Cup
- 2025 GT4 Australia Series
- 2025 SRO GT Cup
- 2025 SRO Japan Cup
