= 2024 GT4 America Series =

Sports car racing series

The 2024 Pirelli GT4 America Series was the sixth season of the GT4 America Series. The season began on April 7 at Sonoma Raceway and ended on October 6 at Indianapolis Motor Speedway.

== Calendar ==
The preliminary calendar was released on July 1, 2023, featuring 14 races across seven rounds. The calendar was later updated in September, replacing the second round at NOLA Motorsports Park with a round at Sebring International Raceway. Round 6, which was set as TBA on the preliminary calendar was confirmed to be a round at Barber Motorsports Park. All rounds support the 2024 GT World Challenge America. The calendar was dropped to 13 rounds with Pirelli GT4 America's first ever endurance race at COTA.

Race was an Endurance Round

Round	Circuit	Date
1	Sonoma Raceway, Sonoma, California	April 5–7
2	Sebring International Raceway, Sebring, Florida	May 3–5
3	Circuit of the Americas, Austin, Texas	May 17–19
4	Virginia International Raceway, Alton, Virginia	July 19–21
5	Road America, Elkhart Lake, Wisconsin	August 16–18
6	Barber Motorsports Park, Birmingham, Alabama	September 6–8
7	Indianapolis Motor Speedway, Indianapolis, Indiana	October 4–6

== Entry list ==
Team	Car	Engine	No.	Drivers	Class	Rounds
(United States) Precision Racing L.A.	Toyota GR Supra GT4 Evo	BMW B58B30 3.0 L Twin-Turbo I6	07	(United States) Ryan Eversley	PA	1, 3–5, 7
(United States) Precision Racing L.A.	Toyota GR Supra GT4 Evo	BMW B58B30 3.0 L Twin-Turbo I6	07	(United States) Harry Cheung	PA	1
(United States) Precision Racing L.A.	Toyota GR Supra GT4 Evo	BMW B58B30 3.0 L Twin-Turbo I6	07	(United States) Mike Lamarra	PA	3
(United States) Precision Racing L.A.	Toyota GR Supra GT4 Evo	BMW B58B30 3.0 L Twin-Turbo I6	07	(United States) Alexandra Hainer	PA	4–5
(United States) Precision Racing L.A.	Toyota GR Supra GT4 Evo	BMW B58B30 3.0 L Twin-Turbo I6	07	(United States) Terry Borcheller	PA	7
(Germany) Rotek Racing	Porsche 718 Cayman GT4 RS Clubsport	Porsche MDG 4.0 L Flat-6	098	(United States) Myles Rowe	PA	7
(Germany) Rotek Racing	Porsche 718 Cayman GT4 RS Clubsport	Porsche MDG 4.0 L Flat-6	098	(United States) Isaac Sherman	PA	7
(Germany) Rotek Racing	Porsche 718 Cayman GT4 RS Clubsport	Porsche MDG 4.0 L Flat-6	099	(United States) Robb Holland	Am	All
(Germany) Rotek Racing	Porsche 718 Cayman GT4 RS Clubsport	Porsche MDG 4.0 L Flat-6	099	(United States) Jaden Lander	Am	All
(United States) Flying Lizard Motorsports	Nissan Z Nismo GT4	Nissan VR30DDTT 3.0 L Twin-Turbo V6	5	(Canada) Damir Hot	PA	All
(United States) Flying Lizard Motorsports	Nissan Z Nismo GT4	Nissan VR30DDTT 3.0 L Twin-Turbo V6	5	(Canada) Stefan Rzadzinski	PA	1–2
(United States) Flying Lizard Motorsports	Nissan Z Nismo GT4	Nissan VR30DDTT 3.0 L Twin-Turbo V6	5	(Brazil) Rodrigo Baptista	PA	3–4, 6–7
(United States) Flying Lizard Motorsports	Nissan Z Nismo GT4	Nissan VR30DDTT 3.0 L Twin-Turbo V6	5	(United States) Andy Lee	PA	5
(United States) Flying Lizard Motorsports	Aston Martin Vantage AMR GT4	Aston Martin M177 4.0 L Turbo V8	13	(United States) Tom Dyer	PA	1–6
(United States) Flying Lizard Motorsports	Aston Martin Vantage AMR GT4	Aston Martin M177 4.0 L Turbo V8	13	(United States) Todd Parriott	PA	1–6
(United States) ACI Motorsports	Porsche 718 Cayman GT4 RS Clubsport	Porsche MDG 4.0 L Flat-6	7	(Netherlands) Kay van Berlo	PA	All
(United States) ACI Motorsports	Porsche 718 Cayman GT4 RS Clubsport	Porsche MDG 4.0 L Flat-6	7	(United States) Curt Swearingin	PA	All
(United States) Blackdog Speed Shop	Nissan Z Nismo GT4	Nissan VR30DDTT 3.0 L Twin-Turbo V6	9	(United States) Tony Gaples	PA	All
(United States) Blackdog Speed Shop	Nissan Z Nismo GT4	Nissan VR30DDTT 3.0 L Twin-Turbo V6	9	(United States) Michael Cooper	PA	1, 3–7
(United States) Blackdog Speed Shop	Nissan Z Nismo GT4	Nissan VR30DDTT 3.0 L Twin-Turbo V6	9	(United States) Max Root	PA	2
(United States) Skip Barber Racing	Aston Martin Vantage AMR GT4	Aston Martin M177 4.0 L Turbo V8	16	(United States) Marc Sharinn	Am	3–5
(United States) Skip Barber Racing	Aston Martin Vantage AMR GT4	Aston Martin M177 4.0 L Turbo V8	16	(United States) Tyler Sharinn	Am	3–5
(United States) Skip Barber Racing	Aston Martin Vantage AMR GT4	Aston Martin M177 4.0 L Turbo V8	16	(United States) Alex Garcia	Am	7
(United States) Skip Barber Racing	Aston Martin Vantage AMR GT4	Aston Martin M177 4.0 L Turbo V8	16	(United States) Michael Garcia	Am	7
(United States) OGH Motorsports	Porsche 718 Cayman GT4 RS Clubsport	Porsche MDG 4.0 L Flat-6	17	(United States) Sean Gibbons	Am	1–3
(United States) OGH Motorsports	Porsche 718 Cayman GT4 RS Clubsport	Porsche MDG 4.0 L Flat-6	17	(United States) Sam Owen	Am	1–3
(United States) RennSport1	Porsche 718 Cayman GT4 RS Clubsport	Porsche MDG 4.0 L Flat-6	18	(United States) Austin Krainz	Am 1–2; PA 4–7	1–2, 4–7
(United States) RennSport1	Porsche 718 Cayman GT4 RS Clubsport	Porsche MDG 4.0 L Flat-6	18	(United States) Roland Krainz	Am 1–2; PA 4–7	1–2, 4–7
(United States) RennSport1 - CBW Racing	Porsche 718 Cayman GT4 RS Clubsport	Porsche MDG 4.0 L Flat-6	28	(United States) John Capestro-Dubets	S	All
(United States) RennSport1 - CBW Racing	Porsche 718 Cayman GT4 RS Clubsport	Porsche MDG 4.0 L Flat-6	28	(United States) Eric Filgueiras	S	All
(United States) Carrus Callas Raceteam	BMW M4 GT4 Gen II	BMW S58B30T0 3.0 L Twin Turbo I6	20	(United States) Nicholas Shanny	Am	All
(United States) Carrus Callas Raceteam	BMW M4 GT4 Gen II	BMW S58B30T0 3.0 L Twin Turbo I6	20	(United States) Terry Borcheller	Am	1–3
(United States) Carrus Callas Raceteam	BMW M4 GT4 Gen II	BMW S58B30T0 3.0 L Twin Turbo I6	20	(United States) Chris Walsh	Am	4–7
(United States) TechSport Racing	Nissan Z Nismo GT4	Nissan VR30DDTT 3.0 L Twin-Turbo V6	22	(United States) Colin Harrison	PA	All
(United States) TechSport Racing	Nissan Z Nismo GT4	Nissan VR30DDTT 3.0 L Twin-Turbo V6	22	(United States) Eric Powell	PA	1–4
(United States) TechSport Racing	Nissan Z Nismo GT4	Nissan VR30DDTT 3.0 L Twin-Turbo V6	22	(United States) Elivan Goulart	PA	5–7
(United States) TechSport Racing	Nissan Z Nismo GT4	Nissan VR30DDTT 3.0 L Twin-Turbo V6	23	(United States) Jonathan Neudorf	S 1–4; PA 5–7	All
(United States) TechSport Racing	Nissan Z Nismo GT4	Nissan VR30DDTT 3.0 L Twin-Turbo V6	23	(United States) Michai Stephens	S 1–4; PA 5–7	1–4
(United States) TechSport Racing	Nissan Z Nismo GT4	Nissan VR30DDTT 3.0 L Twin-Turbo V6	23	(Denmark) Johan Schwartz	S 1–4; PA 5–7	5–7
(United States) Heart of Racing Team	Aston Martin Vantage AMR GT4 1–5; Aston Martin Vantage AMR GT4 Evo 6–7	Aston Martin M177 4.0 L Turbo V8	24	(Canada) Roman De Angelis	PA	All
(United States) Heart of Racing Team	Aston Martin Vantage AMR GT4 1–5; Aston Martin Vantage AMR GT4 Evo 6–7	Aston Martin M177 4.0 L Turbo V8	24	(United States) Gray Newell	PA	All
(United States) Heart of Racing Team	Aston Martin Vantage AMR GT4	Aston Martin M177 4.0 L Turbo V8	26	(United States) Hannah Greenemeier	Am 1–2; PA 3 S 4–7	All
(United States) Heart of Racing Team	Aston Martin Vantage AMR GT4	Aston Martin M177 4.0 L Turbo V8	26	(United States) Hannah Grisham	Am 1–2; PA 3 S 4–7	All
(United States) Rigid Speed Company	BMW M4 GT4 Gen II	BMW S58B30T0 3.0 L Twin Turbo I6	33	(United States) Joseph Catania	PA	5
(United States) Rigid Speed Company	BMW M4 GT4 Gen II	BMW S58B30T0 3.0 L Twin Turbo I6	33	(United States) Lucas Catania	PA	5
(United States) JMF Motorsports	Mercedes-AMG GT4	Mercedes-AMG M178 4.0 L V8	34	(Canada) Demi Chalkias	S	1–6 (Note: Demi Chalkias withdrew from the fourth round at VIR due to health reasons. Jake Cowden was allowed to compete solo after no suitable replacement for Chalkias was found.)
(United States) JMF Motorsports	Mercedes-AMG GT4	Mercedes-AMG M178 4.0 L V8	34	(Canada) Jake Cowden	S	1–6
(United States) JMF Motorsports	Mercedes-AMG GT4	Mercedes-AMG M178 4.0 L V8	34	(United States) Michai Stephens	S	7
(United States) JMF Motorsports	Mercedes-AMG GT4	Mercedes-AMG M178 4.0 L V8	34	(Canada) Jesse Webb	S	7
(United States) Bimmerworld Racing	BMW M4 GT4 Gen II	BMW S58B30T0 3.0 L Twin Turbo I6	36	(United States) James Clay	Am	All
(United States) Bimmerworld Racing	BMW M4 GT4 Gen II	BMW S58B30T0 3.0 L Twin Turbo I6	36	(United Kingdom) Charlie Postins	Am	All
(United States) Bimmerworld Racing	BMW M4 GT4 Gen II	BMW S58B30T0 3.0 L Twin Turbo I6	82	(United States) Tyler McQuarrie	PA	All
(United States) Bimmerworld Racing	BMW M4 GT4 Gen II	BMW S58B30T0 3.0 L Twin Turbo I6	82	(United States) James Walker Jr.	PA	All
(United States) OnlyFans Racing With P1 Groupe By RENNtech	Mercedes-AMG GT4	Mercedes-AMG M178 4.0 L V8	43	(United States) Matt Bell	PA	All
(United States) OnlyFans Racing With P1 Groupe By RENNtech	Mercedes-AMG GT4	Mercedes-AMG M178 4.0 L V8	43	(United States) Alex Vogel	PA	All
(United States) RENNtech Motorsports	Mercedes-AMG GT4	Mercedes-AMG M178 4.0 L V8	89	(United States) Michael Auriemma	PA	All
(United States) RENNtech Motorsports	Mercedes-AMG GT4	Mercedes-AMG M178 4.0 L V8	89	(Brazil) Matheus Leist	PA	All
(United States) NOLASport	Porsche 718 Cayman GT4 RS Clubsport	Porsche MDG 4.0 L Flat-6	47	(United States) Matt Travis	PA	6
(United States) NOLASport	Porsche 718 Cayman GT4 RS Clubsport	Porsche MDG 4.0 L Flat-6	47	(United States) Jason Hart	PA	6
(United States) NOLASport	Porsche 718 Cayman GT4 RS Clubsport	Porsche MDG 4.0 L Flat-6	52	(United States) Lee Carpentier	Am	All
(United States) NOLASport	Porsche 718 Cayman GT4 RS Clubsport	Porsche MDG 4.0 L Flat-6	52	(United States) David Peterman	Am	All
(United States) NOLASport	Porsche 718 Cayman GT4 RS Clubsport	Porsche MDG 4.0 L Flat-6	60	(United States) Steve Schneider	Am	1–3
(United States) NOLASport	Porsche 718 Cayman GT4 RS Clubsport	Porsche MDG 4.0 L Flat-6	60	(United States) Seth Thomas	Am	1–3
(United States) Auto Technic Racing	BMW M4 GT4 Gen II	BMW S58B30T0 3.0 L Twin Turbo I6	51	(United States) Zac Anderson	S	All
(United States) Auto Technic Racing	BMW M4 GT4 Gen II	BMW S58B30T0 3.0 L Twin Turbo I6	51	(United States) Colin Garrett	S	All
(United States) Auto Technic Racing	BMW M4 GT4 Gen II	BMW S58B30T0 3.0 L Twin Turbo I6	53	(United States) Matt Million	Am 1–2; PA 3–7	1–3, 5–7
(United States) Auto Technic Racing	BMW M4 GT4 Gen II	BMW S58B30T0 3.0 L Twin Turbo I6	53	(United States) Troy Lindstrom	Am 1–2; PA 3–7	1, 3
(United States) Auto Technic Racing	BMW M4 GT4 Gen II	BMW S58B30T0 3.0 L Twin Turbo I6	53	(United States) Ryan Keeley	Am 1–2; PA 3–7	2
(United States) Auto Technic Racing	BMW M4 GT4 Gen II	BMW S58B30T0 3.0 L Twin Turbo I6	53	(United States) Mark Brummond	Am 1–2; PA 3–7	4
(United States) Auto Technic Racing	BMW M4 GT4 Gen II	BMW S58B30T0 3.0 L Twin Turbo I6	53	(United States) Mike Skeen	Am 1–2; PA 3–7	4
(United States) Auto Technic Racing	BMW M4 GT4 Gen II	BMW S58B30T0 3.0 L Twin Turbo I6	53	(United States) Tyler Stone	Am 1–2; PA 3–7	5–7
(United States) TGR Smooge Racing	Toyota GR Supra GT4 Evo	BMW B58B30 3.0 L Twin-Turbo I6	55	(United States) Kevin Conway	Am	3
(United States) TGR Smooge Racing	Toyota GR Supra GT4 Evo	BMW B58B30 3.0 L Twin-Turbo I6	55	(United States) Isabella Robusto	Am	3
(United States) TGR Smooge Racing	Toyota GR Supra GT4 Evo	BMW B58B30 3.0 L Twin-Turbo I6	68	(United States) Tyler Gonzalez	S	All
(United States) TGR Smooge Racing	Toyota GR Supra GT4 Evo	BMW B58B30 3.0 L Twin-Turbo I6	68	(United States) John Geesbreght	S	1–4
(United States) TGR Smooge Racing	Toyota GR Supra GT4 Evo	BMW B58B30 3.0 L Twin-Turbo I6	68	(United States) Corey Lewis	S	5–7
(United States) KRUGSPEED	Toyota GR Supra GT4 Evo	BMW B58B30 3.0 L Twin-Turbo I6	72	(United States) Anthony Geraci	Am	All
(United States) KRUGSPEED	Toyota GR Supra GT4 Evo	BMW B58B30 3.0 L Twin-Turbo I6	72	(United States) Lance Bergstein	Am	1–2, 4–6
(United States) KRUGSPEED	Toyota GR Supra GT4 Evo	BMW B58B30 3.0 L Twin-Turbo I6	72	(United States) Elivan Goulart	Am	3
(United States) KRUGSPEED	Toyota GR Supra GT4 Evo	BMW B58B30 3.0 L Twin-Turbo I6	72	(United States) Kevin Conway	Am	7
(Canada) VPX Motorsport	Porsche 718 Cayman GT4 RS Clubsport	Porsche MDG 4.0 L Flat-6	77	(United States) Danny Dyszelski	S	6–7
(Canada) VPX Motorsport	Porsche 718 Cayman GT4 RS Clubsport	Porsche MDG 4.0 L Flat-6	77	(Canada) Alex Ellis	S	6
(Canada) VPX Motorsport	Porsche 718 Cayman GT4 RS Clubsport	Porsche MDG 4.0 L Flat-6	77	(Canada) Cayden Goodridge	S	7
(United States) Orlando Motorsport Services	McLaren Artura GT4	McLaren M630 3.0 L Turbo V6	80	(United States) Nick Longhi	Am	2, 7
(United States) Orlando Motorsport Services	McLaren Artura GT4	McLaren M630 3.0 L Turbo V6	80	(United States) Kaia Teo	Am	2, 7
(United States) Random Vandals Racing	BMW M4 GT4 Gen II	BMW S58B30T0 3.0 L Twin Turbo I6	94	(United States) Sam Craven	PA	6–7
(United States) Random Vandals Racing	BMW M4 GT4 Gen II	BMW S58B30T0 3.0 L Twin Turbo I6	94	(United States) Josh Green	PA	6–7
(United States) Random Vandals Racing	BMW M4 GT4 Gen II	BMW S58B30T0 3.0 L Twin Turbo I6	98	(United States) Kris Wilson	Am	All
(United States) Random Vandals Racing	BMW M4 GT4 Gen II	BMW S58B30T0 3.0 L Twin Turbo I6	98	(United States) Paul Sparta	Am	1–5
(United States) Random Vandals Racing	BMW M4 GT4 Gen II	BMW S58B30T0 3.0 L Twin Turbo I6	98	(United States) Michael Kanisczak	Am	6–7
(United States) CrowdStrike Racing by Random Vandals	BMW M4 GT4 Gen II	BMW S58B30T0 3.0 L Twin Turbo I6	97	(United States) Kevin Boehm	S	All
(United States) CrowdStrike Racing by Random Vandals	BMW M4 GT4 Gen II	BMW S58B30T0 3.0 L Twin Turbo I6	97	(United States) Kenton Koch	S	All
(United States) TPC Racing	McLaren Artura GT4	McLaren M630 3.0 L Turbo V6	102	(Italy) Dario Capitanio	PA	6–7
(United States) TPC Racing	McLaren Artura GT4	McLaren M630 3.0 L Turbo V6	102	(United States) Alan Grossberg	PA	6–7
(United States) Fast Track Racing	BMW M4 GT4 Gen II	BMW S58B30T0 3.0 L Twin Turbo I6	188	(United States) Judson Holt	Am	3
(United States) Fast Track Racing	BMW M4 GT4 Gen II	BMW S58B30T0 3.0 L Twin Turbo I6	188	(United States) Denny Stripling	Am	3
(Canada) RySpec Racing	Mercedes-AMG GT4	Mercedes-AMG M178 4.0 L V8	635	(United States) Danny Dyszelski	PA	2
(Canada) RySpec Racing	Mercedes-AMG GT4	Mercedes-AMG M178 4.0 L V8	635	(Denmark) Johan Schwartz	PA	2
(United States) TGR Hanley Motorsports	Toyota GR Supra GT4 Evo	BMW B58B30 3.0 L Twin-Turbo I6	999	(United States) Daniel Hanley	S	1–4
(United States) TGR Hanley Motorsports	Toyota GR Supra GT4 Evo	BMW B58B30 3.0 L Twin-Turbo I6	999	(Canada) Parker Thompson	S	1–4

Icon	Class
S	Silver Cup
PA	Pro-Am Cup
Am	Am Cup
INV	Invitational

Notes:

- Tom Kopczynski was originally set to compete for RennSport1 in the No. 28, but withdrew due to other commitments. RennSport1 substituted Kopczynski with John Capestro-Dubets, with the driver change causing the entry to move classes from Pro-Am to Silver.
- Rigid Speed Company was originally entered for the fourth round at VIR, with Joseph and Lucas Catania driving the No. 33 BMW, but later chose to move the entry to GT America.
- Rodrigo Baptista was originally scheduled to drive the No. 5 Nissan for Flying Lizard Motorsports in the fifth round at Road America, but was replaced by Andy Lee due to an scheduling conflict.
- John Geesbreght was originally scheduled to drive the No. 68 Toyota for TGR Smooge Racing in the fifth round at Road America, but was replaced by Corey Lewis.

== Race results ==
Bold indicates overall winner

Round		Circuit	Pole position	Silver Winners	Pro-Am Winners	Am Winners	Report
1	R1	(California) Sonoma	(United States) #22 TechSport Racing	**(United States) #68 TGR Smooge Racing**	(United States) #82 Bimmerworld Racing	(United States) #26 Heart of Racing Team	Report
1	R1	(California) Sonoma	(United States) Colin Harrison (United States) Eric Powell	**(United States) John Geesbreght** **(United States) Tyler Gonzalez**	(United States) Tyler McQuarrie (United States) James Walker Jr.	(United States) Hannah Greenemeier (United States) Hannah Grisham	Report
1	R2	(California) Sonoma	(United States) #999 TGR Hanley Motorsports	**(United States) #51 Auto Technic Racing**	(United States) #89 RENNtech Motorsports	(United States) #53 Auto Technic Racing	Report
1	R2	(California) Sonoma	(United States) Daniel Hanley (Canada) Parker Thompson	**(United States) Zac Anderson** **(United States) Colin Garrett**	(United States) Michael Auriemma (Brazil) Matheus Leist	(United States) Troy Lindstrom (United States) Matt Million	Report
2	R1	(Florida) Sebring	(United States) #28 RennSport1 - CBW Racing	**(United States) #28 RennSport1 - CBW Racing**	(United States) #7 ACI Motorsports	(United States) #18 RennSport1	Report
2	R1	(Florida) Sebring	(United States) John Capestro-Dubets (United States) Eric Filgueiras	**(United States) John Capestro-Dubets** **(United States) Eric Filgueiras**	(Netherlands) Kay van Berlo (United States) Curt Swearingin	(United States) Austin Krainz (United States) Roland Krainz	Report
2	R2	(Florida) Sebring	(United States) #9 Blackdog Speed Shop	**(United States) #28 RennSport1 - CBW Racing**	(United States) #9 Blackdog Speed Shop	(United States) #98 Random Vandals Racing	Report
2	R2	(Florida) Sebring	(United States) Tony Gaples (United States) Max Root	**(United States) John Capestro-Dubets** **(United States) Eric Filgueiras**	(United States) Tony Gaples (United States) Max Root	(United States) Paul Sparta (United States) Kris Wilson	Report
3	3H	(Texas) COTA	(United States) #9 Blackdog Speed Shop	**(United States) #97 CrowdStrike Racing by Random Vandals**	(United States) #82 Bimmerworld Racing	(United States) #98 Random Vandals Racing	Report
3	3H	(Texas) COTA	(United States) Tony Gaples (United States) Michael Cooper	**(United States) Kevin Boehm** **(United States) Kenton Koch**	(United States) Tyler McQuarrie (United States) James Walker Jr.	(United States) Paul Sparta (United States) Kris Wilson	Report
4	R1	Virginia	(United States) #28 RennSport1 - CBW Racing	**(United States) #28 RennSport1 - CBW Racing**	(United States) #7 ACI Motorsports	(United States) #36 Bimmerworld Racing	Report
4	R1	Virginia	(United States) John Capestro-Dubets (United States) Eric Filgueiras	**(United States) John Capestro-Dubets** **(United States) Eric Filgueiras**	(Netherlands) Kay van Berlo (United States) Curt Swearingin	(United States) James Clay (United Kingdom) Charlie Postins	Report
4	R2	Virginia	(United States) #34 JMF Motorsports	**(United States) #28 RennSport1 - CBW Racing**	(United States) #43 OnlyFans Racing With P1 Groupe By RENNtech	(Germany) #099 Rotek Racing	Report
4	R2	Virginia	(Canada) Demi Chalkias (Canada) Jake Cowden	**(United States) John Capestro-Dubets** **(United States) Eric Filgueiras**	(United States) Matt Bell (United States) Alex Vogel	(United States) Robb Holland (United States) Jaden Lander	Report
5	R1	(Wisconsin) Road America	(United States) #28 RennSport1 - CBW Racing	**(United States) #97 CrowdStrike Racing by Random Vandals**	(United States) #7 ACI Motorsports	(Germany) #099 Rotek Racing	Report
5	R1	(Wisconsin) Road America	(United States) John Capestro-Dubets (United States) Eric Filgueiras	**(United States) Kevin Boehm** **(United States) Kenton Koch**	(Netherlands) Kay van Berlo (United States) Curt Swearingin	(United States) Robb Holland (United States) Jaden Lander	Report
5	R2	(Wisconsin) Road America	(United States) #51 Auto Technic Racing	**(United States) #28 RennSport1 - CBW Racing**	(United States) #24 Heart of Racing Team	(Germany) #099 Rotek Racing	Report
5	R2	(Wisconsin) Road America	(United States) Zac Anderson (United States) Colin Garrett	**(United States) John Capestro-Dubets** **(United States) Eric Filgueiras**	(Canada) Roman De Angelis (United States) Gray Newell	(United States) Robb Holland (United States) Jaden Lander	Report
6	R1	(Alabama) Barber	(United States) #68 TGR Smooge Racing	(United States) **#51 Auto Technic Racing**	(United States) #7 ACI Motorsports	(United States) #36 Bimmerworld Racing	Report
6	R1	(Alabama) Barber	(United States) Tyler Gonzalez (United States) Corey Lewis	(United States) **Zac Anderson** (United States) **Colin Garrett**	(Netherlands) Kay van Berlo (United States) Curt Swearingin	(United States) James Clay (United Kingdom) Charlie Postins	Report
6	R2	(Alabama) Barber	(United States) #89 RENNtech Motorsports	**(United States)** #97 CrowdStrike Racing by Random Vandals	(United States) **#24 Heart of Racing Team**	(United States) #72 KRUGSPEED	Report
6	R2	(Alabama) Barber	(United States) Michael Auriemma (Brazil) Matheus Leist	(United States) Kevin Boehm (United States) Kenton Koch	(Canada) **Roman De Angelis** (United States) **Gray Newell**	(United States) Anthony Geraci (United States) Lance Bergstein	Report
7	R1	(Indiana) Indianapolis	(United States) #89 RENNtech Motorsports	(United States) **#68 TGR Smooge Racing**	(United States) Precision Racing L.A.	(Germany) #099 Rotek Racing	Report
7	R1	(Indiana) Indianapolis	(United States) Michael Auriemma (Brazil) Matheus Leist	(United States) **Tyler Gonzalez** (United States) **Corey Lewis**	(United States) Ryan Eversley (United States) Terry Borcheller	(United States) Robb Holland (United States) Jaden Lander	Report
7	R2	(Indiana) Indianapolis	(United States) #68 TGR Smooge Racing	(United States) #51 Auto Technic Racing	(United States) **#89 RENNtech Motorsports**	(United States) #36 Bimmerworld Racing	Report
7	R2	(Indiana) Indianapolis	(United States) Tyler Gonzalez (United States) Corey Lewis	(United States) Zac Anderson (United States) Colin Garrett	(United States) **Michael Auriemma** (Brazil) **Matheus Leist**	(United States) James Clay (United Kingdom) Charlie Postins	Report

== Championship Standings ==
Scoring system

Position		**1st**	**2nd**	**3rd**	**4th**	**5th**	**6th**	**7th**	**8th**	**9th**	**10th**
Points	1 hour	25	18	15	12	10	8	6	4	2	1
Points	3 hours	50	36	30	24	20	18	12	8	4	2

=== Drivers' championship ===
Pos.	Drivers	Team	SON (United States)		SEB (United States)		COT (United States)	VIR (United States)		ELK (United States)		BAR (United States)		IND (United States)		Points
Pos.	Drivers	Team	RC1	RC2	RC1	RC2	RCU	RC1	RC2	RC1	RC2	RC1	RC2	RC1	RC2	Points
Silver Cup
1	(United States) John Capestro-Dubets (United States) Eric Filgueiras	(United States) RennSport1	7	9	1	1	2	**1**	1	**3**	1	4	19	3	5	250
2	(United States) Kevin Boehm (United States) Kenton Koch	(United States) CrowdStrike Racing by Random Vandals	2	2	3	4	1	24†	2	1	19	2	2	2	Ret	231
3	(United States) Zac Anderson (United States) Colin Garrett	(United States) Auto Technic Racing	9	1	4	2	6	2	13	2	**18**	1	20	10	3	218
4	(United States) Tyler Gonzalez	(United States) TGR Smooge Racing	1	5	8	20	15	4	20†	4	2	**3**	5	1	**Ret**	184
5	(United States) John Geesbreght	(United States) TGR Smooge Racing	1	5	8	20	15	4	20†							99
6	(Canada) Demi Chalkias (Canada) Jake Cowden	(United States) JMF Motorsports	8	10	10	Ret	17	3	**22†**	Ret	8	24	11			97
7	(United States) Daniel Hanley (Canada) Parker Thompson	(United States) TGR Hanley Motorsports	28†	**4**	2	6	3	27†	21†							93
8	(United States) Corey Lewis	(United States) TGR Smooge Racing								4	2	**3**	5	1	**Ret**	85
9	(United States) Hannah Greenemeier (United States) Hannah Grisham	(United States) Heart of Racing Team						11	Ret	8	6	23	3	22	11	83
10	(United States) Michai Stephens	(United States) TechSport Racing	3	26†	DSQ	3	Ret	7	24†							78
10	(United States) Michai Stephens	(United States) JMF Motorsports												28†	4	78
11	(United States) Jonathan Neudorf	(United States) TechSport Racing	3	26†	DSQ	3	Ret	7	24†							52
Pro-Am
1	(Netherlands) Kay van Berlo (United States) Curt Swearingin	(United States) ACI Motorsports	11	6	5	7	7	5	4	5	21	7	Ret	5	Ret	219
2	(Canada) Roman De Angelis (United States) Gray Newell	(United States) Heart of Racing Team	5	8	21	10	18†	10	10	7	3	12	1	25	2	186
3	(United States) Tyler McQuarrie (United States) James Walker Jr.	(United States) Bimmerworld Racing	4	7	Ret	22	4	12	7	Ret	13	17	8	12	10	154
4	(United States) Michael Auriemma (Brazil) Matheus Leist	(United States) RENNtech Motorsports	15	3	9	18	Ret	6	18	10	11	22	**15**	**8**	1	130
5	(United States) Tony Gaples	(United States) Blackdog Speed Shop	18	17	7	**5**	**20†**	16	8	Ret	10	10	Ret	24	17	106
6	(Canada) Damir Hot	(United States) Flying Lizard Motorsports	25†	25†	13	14	Ret	8	23†	6	7	8	Ret	17	9	103
7	(United States) Ryan Eversley	(United States) Precision Racing L.A.	27†	15			9	26†	12	20	23†			4	7	85
7	(Denmark) Johan Schwartz	(Canada) RySpec Racing			6	12										85
7	(Denmark) Johan Schwartz	(United States) TechSport Racing								9	4	Ret	7	20	15	85
8	(United States) Matt Bell (United States) Alex Vogel	(United States) OnlyFans Racing with P1 Groupe by RENNtech	22	19	23	16	19†	22	3	Ret	DNS	26	4	26	23†	78
9	(United States) Tom Dyer (United States); Todd Parriott	(United States) Flying Lizard Motorsports	10	18	Ret	26	14	14	14	12	12	14	14			73
10	(United States) Michael Cooper	(United States) Blackdog Speed Shop	18	17			**20†**	16	8	Ret	10	10	Ret	24	17	66
11	(United States) Colin Harrison	(United States) TechSport Racing	**6**	14	24	13	Ret	13	Ret	19	24†	21	10	19	19	62
12	(United States) Jonathan Neudorf	(United States) TechSport Racing								9	4	Ret	7	20	15	55
13	(Brazil) Rodrigo Baptista	(United States) Flying Lizard Motorsports					Ret	8	23†			8	Ret	17	9	52
14	(United States) Austin Krainz (United States) Roland Krainz	(United States) RennSport1						25†	Ret	11	5	18	13	11	16	51
15	(United States) Eric Powell	(United States) TechSport Racing	**6**	14	24	13	Ret	13	Ret							45
16	(United States) Max Root	(United States) Blackdog Speed Shop			7	**5**										40
17	(United States) Matt Million	(United States) Auto Technic Racing					Ret			13	16	13	9	14	20	35
17	(United States) Tyler Stone	(United States) Auto Technic Racing								13	16	13	9	14	20	35
18	(United States) Mike Lamarra	(United States) Precision Racing L.A.					9									30
18	(United States) Andy Lee	(United States) Flying Lizard Motorsports								6	7					30
19	(United States) Mark Brummond (United States) Mike Skeen	(United States) Auto Technic Racing						9	6							27
20	(Canada) Stefan Rzadzinski	(United States) Flying Lizard Motorsports	25†	25†	13	14										21
21	(United States) Elivan Goulart	(United States) TechSport Racing								19	24†	21	10	19	19	17
22	(United States) Harry Cheung	(United States) Precision Racing L.A.	27†	15												9
23	(United States) Alexandra Hainer	(United States) Precision Racing L.A.						26†	12	20	23†					6
24	(United States) Joseph Catania (United States) Lucas Catania	(United States) Rigid Speed Company								17	Ret					2
25	(United States) Hannah Greenemeier (United States) Hannah Grisham	(United States) Heart of Racing Team					Ret									0
25	(United States) Troy Lindstrom	(United States) Auto Technic Racing					Ret									0
Am
1	(United States) Robb Holland (United States) Jaden Lander	(Germany) Rotek Racing	16	24†	17	23	10	17	5	14	9	15	Ret	13	13	210
2	(United States) Kris Wilson	(United States) Random Vandals Racing	13	12	12	8	5	18	9	Ret	WD	27†	Ret	18	14	200
3	(United States) Nick Shanny	(United States) Carras Callus Raceteam	19	23†	15	27†	8	19	17	15	14	16	17	21	18	173
4	(United States) Paul Sparta	(United States) Random Vandals Racing	13	12	12	8	5	18	9	Ret	WD					162
5	(United States) James Clay (United Kingdom) Charlie Postins	(United States) Bimmerworld Racing	14	28†	20	15	12	15	15	18	22†	11	Ret	Ret	12	156
6	(United States) Anthony Geraci	(United States) KRUGSPEED	20	20	22	21	13	20	16	16	15	20	12	16	26†	150
7	(United States) Chris Walsh	(United States) Carrus Callas Raceteam					8	19	17	15	14	16	17	21	18	149
8	(United States) Lance Bergstein	(United States) KRUGSPEED	20	20	22	21		20	16	16	15	20	12			108
9	(United States) Lee Carpentier (United States) David Peterman	(United States) Nolasport	21	27†	19	24	Ret	21	11	21	20	19	18	23	Ret	91
10	(United States) Hannah Greenemeier (United States) Hannah Grisham	(United States) Heart of Racing Team	12	13	16	11										65
11	(United States) Matt Million	(United States) Auto Technic Racing	17	11	14	17										60
12	(United States) Austin Krainz (United States) Roland Krainz	(United States) RennSport1	26†	16	11	9										55
13	(United States) Marc Sharinn (United States) Tyler Sharinn	(United States) Skip Barber Racing					16	23	19	22	17					44
14	(United States) Troy Lindstrom	(United States) Auto Technic Racing	17	11												35
15	(United States) Nick Longhi (United States) Kaia Teo	(United States) Orlando Motorsport Services			25†	19								27†	21	8
15	(United States) Kevin Conway	(United States) TGR Smooge Racing					Ret									26
15	(United States) Kevin Conway	(United States) KRUGSPEED												16	26†	26
16	(United States) Ryan Keeley	(United States) Auto Technic Racing			14	17										25
17	(United States) Judson Holt (United States) Denny Stripling	(United States) Fast Track Racing					11									24
18	(United States) Sean Gibbons (United States) Sam Owen	(United States) OGH Motorsports	24†	21	Ret	DNS	21†									17
19	(United States) Elivan Goulart	(United States) KRUGSPEED					13									16
20	(United States) Steve Schneider (United States) Seth Thomas	(United States) Nolasport	23	22	18	25										15
21	(United States) Isabella Robusto	(United States) TGR Smooge Racing					Ret									0
Guest drivers ineligible for points:
—	(United States) Terry Borcheller	(United States) Carras Callus Raceteam	19	23†	15	27†										—
—	(United States) Terry Borcheller	(United States) Precision Racing L.A.												4	7	—
—	(Canada) Jesse Webb	(United States) JMF Motorsports												28†	4	—
—	(United States) Matt Travis (United States) Jason Hart	(United States) NOLAsport										5	16			—
—	(United States) Danny Dyszelski	(Canada) RySpec Racing			6	12										—
—	(United States) Danny Dyszelski	(Canada) VPX Motorsport										6	6	7	6	—
—	(Canada) Alex Ellis	(Canada) VPX Motorsport										6	6			—
—	(Canada) Cayden Goodridge	(Canada) VPX Motorsport												7	6	—
—	(United States) Myles Rowe (United States) Isaac Sherman	(Germany) Rotek Racing												6	8	—
—	(United States) Sam Craven (United States) Josh Green	(United States) Random Vandals Racing										9	Ret	9	24†	—
—	(United States) Michael Kanisczak	(United States) Random Vandals Racing										27†	Ret	18	14	—
—	(Italy) Dario Capitanio (United States) Alan Grossberg	(United States) TPC Racing										25	Ret	15	25†	—
—	(United States) Alex Garcia (United States) Michael Garcia	(United States) Skip Barber Racing												Ret	22	—
Pos.	Driver	Team	SON (United States)		SEB (United States)		COT (United States)	VIR (United States)		ELK (United States)		BAR (United States)		IND (United States)		Points

Key
Colour	Result
Gold	Race winner
Silver	2nd place
Bronze	3rd place
Green	Points finish
Blue	Non-points finish
Blue	Non-classified finish (NC)
Purple	Did not finish (Ret)
Black	Disqualified (DSQ)
Black	Excluded (EX)
White	Did not start (DNS)
White	Race cancelled (C)
White	Withdrew (WD)
Blank	Did not participate

**Bold** – Pole
Italics – Fastest Lap
† – Drivers did not finish the race but were classified.

== See also ==
- 2024 British GT Championship
- 2024 GT4 European Series
- 2024 French GT4 Cup
- 2024 GT4 Australia Series
- 2024 GT World Challenge Asia
