= 2023 GT4 America Series =

Racing series

The 2023 Pirelli GT4 America Series is the fifth season of the GT4 America Series. The season began on April 2 at Sonoma Raceway and ended on October 8 at Indianapolis Motor Speedway.

== Calendar ==
The preliminary calendar was released on July 29, 2022, featuring 14 races across seven rounds. All rounds support the 2023 GT World Challenge America.

Round	Circuit	Date
1	(United States) Sonoma Raceway, Sonoma, California	March 30 – April 2
2	(United States) NOLA Motorsports Park, Avondale, Louisiana	April 28–30
3	(United States) Circuit of the Americas, Austin, Texas	May 19–21
4	(United States) Virginia International Raceway, Alton, Virginia	June 16–18
5	(United States) Road America, Elkhart Lake, Wisconsin	August 18–20
6	(United States) Sebring International Raceway, Sebring, Florida	September 22–24
7	(United States) Indianapolis Motor Speedway, Indianapolis, Indiana	October 6–8

== Entry list ==
Team	Car	Engine	No.	Drivers	Class	Rounds
(United States) Zotz Racing / CCDP Racing	Porsche 718 Cayman GT4 RS Clubsport	Porsche 4.0 L Flat-6	09	(United States) Christian Ruppel	Am	1–6
(United States) Zotz Racing / CCDP Racing	Porsche 718 Cayman GT4 RS Clubsport	Porsche 4.0 L Flat-6	09	(United States) Eric Zitza	Am	1–6
(United States) Archangel Motorsports	Aston Martin Vantage AMR GT4	Aston Martin 4.0 L Turbo V8	069	(United States) Todd Coleman	PA	1–3
(United States) Archangel Motorsports	Aston Martin Vantage AMR GT4	Aston Martin 4.0 L Turbo V8	069	(United States) Billy Johnson	PA	1–3
(Germany) Rotek Racing	Porsche 718 Cayman GT4 RS Clubsport	Porsche 4.0 L Flat-6	099	(United States) Robb Holland	Am	1–2
(Germany) Rotek Racing	Porsche 718 Cayman GT4 RS Clubsport	Porsche 4.0 L Flat-6	099	(United States) Alain Stad	Am	1–2
(United States) Flying Lizard Motorsports	Aston Martin Vantage AMR GT4	Aston Martin 4.0 L Turbo V8	2	(United States) Jason Bell	PA	3, 6–7
(United States) Flying Lizard Motorsports	Aston Martin Vantage AMR GT4	Aston Martin 4.0 L Turbo V8	2	(United States) Michael Cooper	PA	3, 6–7
(United States) Flying Lizard Motorsports	Aston Martin Vantage AMR GT4	Aston Martin 4.0 L Turbo V8	8	(United States) Andy Lee	PA; S (Note: Entered as Silver instead of Pro-Am in Race 2 of Round 6 at Sebring.)	All; 6
(United States) Flying Lizard Motorsports	Aston Martin Vantage AMR GT4	Aston Martin 4.0 L Turbo V8	8	(United States) Elias Sabo	PA; S	All; 6
(United States) Flying Lizard Motorsports	Aston Martin Vantage AMR GT4	Aston Martin 4.0 L Turbo V8	13	(United States) Tom Dyer	PA	7
(United States) Flying Lizard Motorsports	Aston Martin Vantage AMR GT4	Aston Martin 4.0 L Turbo V8	13	(United States) Todd Parriott	PA	7
(United States) ACI Motorsports	Porsche 718 Cayman GT4 RS Clubsport	Porsche 4.0 L Flat-6	7	(Netherlands) Kay van Berlo	PA	All
(United States) ACI Motorsports	Porsche 718 Cayman GT4 RS Clubsport	Porsche 4.0 L Flat-6	7	(United States) Curt Swearingin	PA	All
(United States) ACI Motorsports	Porsche 718 Cayman GT4 RS Clubsport	Porsche 4.0 L Flat-6	19	(United States) Andrew Davis	S	All
(United States) ACI Motorsports	Porsche 718 Cayman GT4 RS Clubsport	Porsche 4.0 L Flat-6	19	(United States) Francis Selldorff	S	All
(United States) ACI Motorsports	Porsche 718 Cayman GT4 RS Clubsport	Porsche 4.0 L Flat-6	58	(United States) Richard Edge	Am	All
(United States) ACI Motorsports	Porsche 718 Cayman GT4 RS Clubsport	Porsche 4.0 L Flat-6	58	(United States) Matt Halcome	Am	All
(United States) Rooster Hall Racing	BMW M4 GT4 Gen II	BMW 3.0 L Twin-Turbo I6	12	(United States) Michael Dayton	Am	4
(United States) Rooster Hall Racing	BMW M4 GT4 Gen II	BMW 3.0 L Twin-Turbo I6	12	(United States) Jason Griscavage	Am	4
(United States) Rooster Hall Racing	BMW M4 GT4 Gen II	BMW 3.0 L Twin-Turbo I6	44	(United States) Colin Garrett	PA	All
(United States) Rooster Hall Racing	BMW M4 GT4 Gen II	BMW 3.0 L Twin-Turbo I6	44	(Denmark) Johan Schwartz	PA	All
(United States) GMG Racing	Porsche 718 Cayman GT4 RS Clubsport	Porsche 4.0 L Flat-6	13	(United States) Tom Dyer	PA	5
(United States) GMG Racing	Porsche 718 Cayman GT4 RS Clubsport	Porsche 4.0 L Flat-6	13	(United States) Todd Parriott	PA	5
(United States) GMG Racing	Porsche 718 Cayman GT4 RS Clubsport	Porsche 4.0 L Flat-6	32	(United States) James Sofronas	Am	1
(United States) GMG Racing	Porsche 718 Cayman GT4 RS Clubsport	Porsche 4.0 L Flat-6	32	(United States) Kyle Washington	Am	1
(United States) GMG Racing	Porsche 718 Cayman GT4 RS Clubsport	Porsche 4.0 L Flat-6	71	(United States) Jay Logan	PA	3
(United States) GMG Racing	Porsche 718 Cayman GT4 RS Clubsport	Porsche 4.0 L Flat-6	71	(United States) Alec Udell	PA	3
(United States) RennSport1	Porsche 718 Cayman GT4 RS Clubsport	Porsche 4.0 L Flat-6	18	(United States) Austin Krainz	Am	All
(United States) RennSport1	Porsche 718 Cayman GT4 RS Clubsport	Porsche 4.0 L Flat-6	18	(Austria) Roland Krainz	Am	All
(United States) TGR Carrus Callas Raceteam	Toyota GR Supra GT4	BMW B58B30 3.0 L Twin-Turbo I6	20	(United States) Terry Borcheller	Am	All
(United States) TGR Carrus Callas Raceteam	Toyota GR Supra GT4	BMW B58B30 3.0 L Twin-Turbo I6	20	(United States) Nick Shanny	Am	All
(United States) TechSport Racing	Nissan Z Nismo GT4	Nissan VR30DDTT 3.0 L Twin-Turbo V6	22	(United States) Colin Harrison	Am	1
(United States) TechSport Racing	Nissan Z Nismo GT4	Nissan VR30DDTT 3.0 L Twin-Turbo V6	22	(United States) Eric Powell	Am	1
(United States) TechSport Racing	Nissan Z Nismo GT4	Nissan VR30DDTT 3.0 L Twin-Turbo V6	22	(United States) Colin Harrison	PA	All
(United States) TechSport Racing	Nissan Z Nismo GT4	Nissan VR30DDTT 3.0 L Twin-Turbo V6	22	(United States) Eric Powell	PA	All
(United States) TechSport Racing	Nissan Z Nismo GT4	Nissan VR30DDTT 3.0 L Twin-Turbo V6	23	(United States) Bryan Heitkotter	PA	All
(United States) TechSport Racing	Nissan Z Nismo GT4	Nissan VR30DDTT 3.0 L Twin-Turbo V6	23	(United States) Tyler Stone	PA	All
(United States) Heart of Racing Team	Aston Martin Vantage AMR GT4	Aston Martin 4.0 L Turbo V8	24	(United States) Gray Newell	PA	All
(United States) Heart of Racing Team	Aston Martin Vantage AMR GT4	Aston Martin 4.0 L Turbo V8	24	(United States) Ian James	PA	1
(United States) Heart of Racing Team	Aston Martin Vantage AMR GT4	Aston Martin 4.0 L Turbo V8	24	(Canada) Roman De Angelis	PA	2–7
(United States) Heart of Racing Team	Aston Martin Vantage AMR GT4	Aston Martin 4.0 L Turbo V8	26	(United States) Hannah Grisham	Am	All
(United States) Heart of Racing Team	Aston Martin Vantage AMR GT4	Aston Martin 4.0 L Turbo V8	26	(New Zealand) Rianna O'Meara-Hunt	Am	All
(United States) JTR Motorsports Engineering	Mercedes-AMG GT4	Mercedes-AMG M178 4.0 L V8	29	(United States) Peter Atwater	PA	1
(United States) JTR Motorsports Engineering	Mercedes-AMG GT4	Mercedes-AMG M178 4.0 L V8	29	(United States) Luca Mars	PA	1
(United States) Conquest Racing / JMF Motorsports	Mercedes-AMG GT4	Mercedes-AMG M178 4.0 L V8	34	(United States) Michai Stephens	S	All
(United States) Conquest Racing / JMF Motorsports	Mercedes-AMG GT4	Mercedes-AMG M178 4.0 L V8	34	(Canada) Jesse Webb	S	All
(United States) Conquest Racing	Mercedes-AMG GT4	Mercedes-AMG M178 4.0 L V8	35	(Brazil) Paulo Carcasci	Am	1–2
(United States) Conquest Racing	Mercedes-AMG GT4	Mercedes-AMG M178 4.0 L V8	35	(Brazil) Custodio Toledo	Am	1–2
(United States) Conquest Racing	Mercedes-AMG GT4	Mercedes-AMG M178 4.0 L V8	35	(Monaco) Cédric Sbirrazzuoli	PA	5–7
(United States) Conquest Racing	Mercedes-AMG GT4	Mercedes-AMG M178 4.0 L V8	35	(Brazil) Custodio Toledo	PA	5–7
(United States) Bimmerworld Racing	BMW M4 GT4 Gen II	BMW 3.0 L Twin-Turbo I6	36	(United States) James Clay	Am	All
(United States) Bimmerworld Racing	BMW M4 GT4 Gen II	BMW 3.0 L Twin-Turbo I6	36	(United Kingdom) Charlie Postins	Am	All
(United States) Bimmerworld Racing	BMW M4 GT4 Gen II	BMW 3.0 L Twin-Turbo I6	82	(United States) Tyler McQuarrie	PA	All
(United States) Bimmerworld Racing	BMW M4 GT4 Gen II	BMW 3.0 L Twin-Turbo I6	82	(United States) James Walker Jr.	PA	All
(United States) TGR Skip Barber Racing School	Toyota GR Supra GT4	BMW B58B30 3.0 L Twin-Turbo I6	37	(United States) Carter Fartuch	PA	All
(United States) TGR Skip Barber Racing School	Toyota GR Supra GT4	BMW B58B30 3.0 L Twin-Turbo I6	37	(United States) Matthew Forbush	PA	All
(United States) NolaSport	Porsche 718 Cayman GT4 RS Clubsport	Porsche 4.0 L Flat-6	47	(United States) Jason Hart	PA	All
(United States) NolaSport	Porsche 718 Cayman GT4 RS Clubsport	Porsche 4.0 L Flat-6	47	(United States) Matt Travis	PA	All
(United States) NolaSport	Porsche 718 Cayman GT4 RS Clubsport	Porsche 4.0 L Flat-6	52	(United States) Lee Carpentier	Am	All
(United States) NolaSport	Porsche 718 Cayman GT4 RS Clubsport	Porsche 4.0 L Flat-6	52	(United States) David Peterman	Am	All
(United States) NolaSport	Porsche 718 Cayman GT4 RS Clubsport	Porsche 4.0 L Flat-6	83	(Colombia) Nelson Calle	Am	All
(United States) NolaSport	Porsche 718 Cayman GT4 RS Clubsport	Porsche 4.0 L Flat-6	83	(United States) Juan Pablo Martinez	Am	All
(United States) Chouest Povoledo Racing	Aston Martin Vantage AMR GT4	Aston Martin 4.0 L Turbo V8	50	(United States) Ross Chouest	PA	All
(United States) Chouest Povoledo Racing	Aston Martin Vantage AMR GT4	Aston Martin 4.0 L Turbo V8	50	(Canada) Aaron Povoledo	PA	All
(United States) Auto Technic Racing	BMW M4 GT4 Gen II	BMW 3.0 L Twin-Turbo I6	51	(United States) Zac Anderson	S	1, 3–7
(United States) Auto Technic Racing	BMW M4 GT4 Gen II	BMW 3.0 L Twin-Turbo I6	51	(United States) John Capestro-Dubets	S	1, 3–4, 6–7
(United States) Auto Technic Racing	BMW M4 GT4 Gen II	BMW 3.0 L Twin-Turbo I6	253	(United States) Satakal Khalsa	Am	All
(United States) Auto Technic Racing	BMW M4 GT4 Gen II	BMW 3.0 L Twin-Turbo I6	253	(United States) Rob Walker	Am	All
(United States) Black Swan Racing	McLaren Artura GT4	McLaren M630 3.0 L Turbo V6	54	(Netherlands) Jeroen Bleekemolen	PA	1–3
(United States) Black Swan Racing	McLaren Artura GT4	McLaren M630 3.0 L Turbo V6	54	(United States) Tim Pappas	PA	1–3
(United States) TGR Smooge Racing	Toyota GR Supra GT4 Evo	BMW B58B30 3.0 L Twin-Turbo I6	67	(United States) Joey DaSilva	Am	1–2, 4–7
(United States) TGR Smooge Racing	Toyota GR Supra GT4 Evo	BMW B58B30 3.0 L Twin-Turbo I6	67	(United States) Isabella Robusto	Am	1, 4, 7
(United States) TGR Smooge Racing	Toyota GR Supra GT4 Evo	BMW B58B30 3.0 L Twin-Turbo I6	67	(United States) Tony Ave	Am	2, 5–6
(United States) TGR Smooge Racing	Toyota GR Supra GT4 Evo	BMW B58B30 3.0 L Twin-Turbo I6	67	(United States) Joey DaSilva	PA	3
(United States) TGR Smooge Racing	Toyota GR Supra GT4 Evo	BMW B58B30 3.0 L Twin-Turbo I6	67	(United States) Jesse Love	PA	3
(United States) TGR Smooge Racing	Toyota GR Supra GT4 Evo	BMW B58B30 3.0 L Twin-Turbo I6	68	(United States) Kevin Conway	S	1
(United States) TGR Smooge Racing	Toyota GR Supra GT4 Evo	BMW B58B30 3.0 L Twin-Turbo I6	68	(United States) John Geesbreght	S	1
(United States) TGR Smooge Racing	Toyota GR Supra GT4 Evo	BMW B58B30 3.0 L Twin-Turbo I6	68	(United States) Kevin Conway	PA	2–7
(United States) TGR Smooge Racing	Toyota GR Supra GT4 Evo	BMW B58B30 3.0 L Twin-Turbo I6	68	(United States) John Geesbreght	PA	2–6
(United States) TGR Smooge Racing	Toyota GR Supra GT4 Evo	BMW B58B30 3.0 L Twin-Turbo I6	68	(United States) Aaron Telitz	PA	7
(United States) KRUGSPEED	Toyota GR Supra GT4	BMW B58B30 3.0 L Twin-Turbo I6	72	(United States) Anthony Geraci	Am	2–7
(United States) KRUGSPEED	Toyota GR Supra GT4	BMW B58B30 3.0 L Twin-Turbo I6	72	(United States) Jaden Lander	Am	2–7
(United States) TGR Copeland Motorsports	Toyota GR Supra GT4	BMW B58B30 3.0 L Twin-Turbo I6	74	(United States) Tyler Gonzalez	S	1–4, 6
(United States) TGR Copeland Motorsports	Toyota GR Supra GT4	BMW B58B30 3.0 L Twin-Turbo I6	74	(United States) Tyler Maxson	S	1–4, 6
(United States) TR3 Racing	Mercedes-AMG GT4	Mercedes-AMG M178 4.0 L V8	77	(United States) Jon Branam	Am	1–4
(United States) TR3 Racing	Mercedes-AMG GT4	Mercedes-AMG M178 4.0 L V8	77	(United States) Paul Kiebler	Am	1–4
(United States) Crucial Motorsports	McLaren Artura GT4	McLaren M630 3.0 L V6	80	(United States) Nick Longhi	Am	5–6
(United States) Crucial Motorsports	McLaren Artura GT4	McLaren M630 3.0 L V6	80	(United States) Kaia Teo	Am	5–6
(United States) BGB Motorsports	Porsche 718 Cayman GT4 RS Clubsport	Porsche 4.0 L Flat-6	81	(Canada) Thomas Collingwood	Am	6
(United States) BGB Motorsports	Porsche 718 Cayman GT4 RS Clubsport	Porsche 4.0 L Flat-6	81	(United States) John Tecce	Am	6
(Canada) STR38 Motorsports	BMW M4 GT4 Gen II	BMW 3.0 L Twin-Turbo I6	88	(United States) Chandler Hull	S	All
(Canada) STR38 Motorsports	BMW M4 GT4 Gen II	BMW 3.0 L Twin-Turbo I6	88	(United States) Jon Miller	S	1, 3
(Canada) STR38 Motorsports	BMW M4 GT4 Gen II	BMW 3.0 L Twin-Turbo I6	88	(United States) Harry Gottsacker	S	2, 4–7
(Canada) STR38 Motorsports	BMW M4 GT4 Gen II	BMW 3.0 L Twin-Turbo I6	438	(United States) Chris Allen	Am	All
(Canada) STR38 Motorsports	BMW M4 GT4 Gen II	BMW 3.0 L Twin-Turbo I6	438	(United States) Robert Mau	Am	All
(United States) RENNtech Motorsports	Mercedes-AMG GT4	Mercedes-AMG M178 4.0 L V8	89	(United States) Michael Auriemma	Am	All
(United States) RENNtech Motorsports	Mercedes-AMG GT4	Mercedes-AMG M178 4.0 L V8	89	(United States) Tommy Johnson	Am	All
(United States) CrowdStrike Racing by Random Vandals	BMW M4 GT4 Gen II	BMW 3.0 L Twin-Turbo I6	92	(United States) Kevin Boehm	S	All
(United States) CrowdStrike Racing by Random Vandals	BMW M4 GT4 Gen II	BMW 3.0 L Twin-Turbo I6	92	(United States) Kenton Koch	S	All
(United States) Random Vandals Racing	BMW M4 GT4 Gen II	BMW 3.0 L Twin-Turbo I6	98	(United States) Al Carter	Am	All
(United States) Random Vandals Racing	BMW M4 GT4 Gen II	BMW 3.0 L Twin-Turbo I6	98	(United States) Paul Sparta	Am	All
(United States) Valkyrie Velocity Racing	Porsche 718 Cayman GT4 RS Clubsport	Porsche 4.0 L Flat-6	95	(United States) Rob Ferriol	PA	1–3
(United States) Valkyrie Velocity Racing	Porsche 718 Cayman GT4 RS Clubsport	Porsche 4.0 L Flat-6	95	(Canada) Mac Clark	PA	1
(United States) Valkyrie Velocity Racing	Porsche 718 Cayman GT4 RS Clubsport	Porsche 4.0 L Flat-6	95	(United States) Will Owen	PA	2–3
(United States) Valkyrie Velocity Racing	Porsche 718 Cayman GT4 RS Clubsport	Porsche 4.0 L Flat-6	96	(United States) Dominic Starkweather	S	1–3
(United States) Valkyrie Velocity Racing	Porsche 718 Cayman GT4 RS Clubsport	Porsche 4.0 L Flat-6	96	(United States) Chris Walsh	S	1–3
(United States) Valkyrie Velocity Racing	Porsche 718 Cayman GT4 RS Clubsport	Porsche 4.0 L Flat-6	97	(United States) Sean Gibbons	Am	1–3
(United States) Valkyrie Velocity Racing	Porsche 718 Cayman GT4 RS Clubsport	Porsche 4.0 L Flat-6	97	(United States) Sam Owen	Am	1–3
(United States) Extreme Velocity Motorsports	Porsche 718 Cayman GT4 RS Clubsport	Porsche 4.0 L Flat-6	99	(United States) Matt Joffe	Am	4
(United States) Extreme Velocity Motorsports	Porsche 718 Cayman GT4 RS Clubsport	Porsche 4.0 L Flat-6	99	(United States) Grant Maiman	Am	4
(United States) Van der Steur Racing	Aston Martin Vantage AMR GT4	Aston Martin 4.0 L Turbo V8	119	(United Kingdom) Jamie Day	S	5
(United States) Van der Steur Racing	Aston Martin Vantage AMR GT4	Aston Martin 4.0 L Turbo V8	119	(United States) Rory van der Steur	S	5
(United States) Van der Steur Racing	Aston Martin Vantage AMR GT4	Aston Martin 4.0 L Turbo V8	428	(United States) Brady Behrman	PA	1
(United States) Van der Steur Racing	Aston Martin Vantage AMR GT4	Aston Martin 4.0 L Turbo V8	428	(United States) Coby Shield	PA	1
(United States) Van der Steur Racing	Aston Martin Vantage AMR GT4	Aston Martin 4.0 L Turbo V8	428	(United States) Brady Behrman	Am	2–4
(United States) Van der Steur Racing	Aston Martin Vantage AMR GT4	Aston Martin 4.0 L Turbo V8	428	(United States) Coby Shield	Am	2–4
(United States) SP Motorsports	Porsche 718 Cayman GT4 RS Clubsport	Porsche 4.0 L Flat-6	899	(United States) Jaden Conwright	PA	1
(United States) SP Motorsports	Porsche 718 Cayman GT4 RS Clubsport	Porsche 4.0 L Flat-6	899	(Indonesia) Anderson Tanoto	PA	1
(United States) TGR Hanley Motorsports	Toyota GR Supra GT4 Evo	BMW B58B30 3.0 L Twin-Turbo I6	999	(United States) Daniel Hanley	S	All
(United States) TGR Hanley Motorsports	Toyota GR Supra GT4 Evo	BMW B58B30 3.0 L Twin-Turbo I6	999	(Canada) Parker Thompson	S	All

Icon	Class
S	Silver Cup
PA	Pro-Am Cup
Am	Am Cup
INV	Invitational

== Race results ==
Bold indicates overall winner

Round		Circuit	Pole position	Silver Winners	Pro/Am Winners	Am Winners	Ref.
1	R1	(United States) Sonoma	(United States) #34 Conquest Racing / JMF Motorsport	(United States) #34 Conquest Racing / JMF Motorsport	**(United States) #47 NolaSport**	(United States) #35 Conquest Racing	Report
1	R1	(United States) Sonoma	(United States) Michai Stephens (Canada) Jesse Webb	(United States) Michai Stephens (Canada) Jesse Webb	**(United States) Jason Hart** **(United States) Matt Travis**	(Brazil) Paulo Carcasci (Brazil) Custodio Toledo	Report
1	R2	(United States) Sonoma	(United States) #47 NolaSport	(United States) #34 Conquest Racing / JMF Motorsport	(United States) #50 Chouest Povoledo Racing	**(United States) #20 TGR Carrus Callas Raceteam**	Report
1	R2	(United States) Sonoma	(United States) Jason Hart (United States) Matt Travis	(United States) Michai Stephens (Canada) Jesse Webb	(United States) Ross Chouest (Canada) Aaron Povoledo	**(United States) Terry Borcheller** **(United States) Nick Shanny**	Report
2	R1	(United States) NOLA	(United States) #34 Conquest Racing / JMF Motorsport	**(United States) #51 Auto Technic Racing**	(United States) #24 Heart of Racing Team	(United States) #36 Bimmerworld Racing	Report
2	R1	(United States) NOLA	(United States) Michai Stephens (Canada) Jesse Webb	**(United States) Zac Anderson** **(United States) John Capestro-Dubets**	(Canada) Roman De Angelis (United States) Gray Newell	(United Kingdom) Charlie Postins (United States) James Clay	Report
2	R2	(United States) NOLA	(United States) #92 CrowdStrike Racing by Random Vandals	Race cancelled (Note: Due to weather condition, Race 1 of NOLA round was moved back a day and Race 2 was cancelled, with a make up race later added to Sebring round.)			
2	R2	(United States) NOLA	(United States) Kevin Boehm (United States) Kenton Koch	Race cancelled			
3	R1	(United States) COTA	(United States) #74 TGR Copeland Motorsports	**(United States) #51 Auto Technic Racing**	(United States) #68 TGR Smooge Racing	(Canada) #438 STR38 Motorsports	Report
3	R1	(United States) COTA	(United States) Tyler Gonzalez (United States) Tyler Maxson	**(United States) Zac Anderson** **(United States) John Capestro-Dubets**	(United States) Kevin Conway (United States) John Geesbreght	(United States) Robert Mau (New Zealand) Chris Allen	Report
3	R2	(United States) COTA	(United States) #54 Black Swan Racing	(United States) #999 TGR Hanley Motorsports	**(United States) #2 Flying Lizard Motorsports**	(United States) #36 Bimmerworld Racing	Report
3	R2	(United States) COTA	(Netherlands) Jeroen Bleekemolen (United States) Tim Pappas	(United States) Daniel Hanley (Canada) Parker Thompson	**(United States) Jason Bell** **(United States) Michael Cooper**	(United Kingdom) Charlie Postins (United States) James Clay	Report
4	R1	(United States) Virginia	(United States) #51 Auto Technic Racing	**(United States) #92 CrowdStrike Racing by Random Vandals**	(United States) #82 Bimmerworld Racing	(United States) #36 Bimmerworld Racing	Report
4	R1	(United States) Virginia	(United States) Zac Anderson (United States) John Capestro-Dubets	**(United States) Kevin Boehm** **(United States) Kenton Koch**	(United States) Tyler McQuarrie (United States) James Walker Jr.	(United Kingdom) Charlie Postins (United States) James Clay	Report
4	R2	(United States) Virginia	(United States) #999 TGR Hanley Motorsports	**(United States) #51 Auto Technic Racing**	(United States) #82 Bimmerworld Racing	(United States) #36 Bimmerworld Racing	Report
4	R2	(United States) Virginia	(United States) Daniel Hanley (Canada) Parker Thompson	**(United States) Zac Anderson** **(United States) John Capestro-Dubets**	(United States) Tyler McQuarrie (United States) James Walker Jr.	(United Kingdom) Charlie Postins (United States) James Clay	Report
5	R1	(United States) Road America	(United States) #34 Conquest Racing / JMF Motorsport	**(United States) #34 Conquest Racing / JMF Motorsport**	(United States) #44 Rooster Hall Racing	(United States) #36 Bimmerworld Racing	Report
5	R1	(United States) Road America	(United States) Michai Stephens (Canada) Jesse Webb	**(United States) Michai Stephens** **(Canada) Jesse Webb**	(United States) Colin Garrett (Denmark) Johan Schwartz	(United Kingdom) Charlie Postins (United States) James Clay	Report
5	R2	(United States) Road America	Session cancelled	**(United States) #51 Auto Technic Racing**	(United States) #82 Bimmerworld Racing	(United States) #36 Bimmerworld Racing	Report
5	R2	(United States) Road America	Session cancelled	**(United States) Zac Anderson**	(United States) Tyler McQuarrie (United States) James Walker Jr.	(United Kingdom) Charlie Postins (United States) James Clay	Report
6	MU	(United States) Sebring	Based on NOLA Qualifying 2	(United States) #999 TGR Hanley Motorsports	(United States) Flying Lizard Motorsports	(United States) #36 Bimmerworld Racing	Report
6	MU	(United States) Sebring	Based on NOLA Qualifying 2	(United States) Daniel Hanley (Canada) Parker Thompson	(United States) Andy Lee (United States) Elias Sabo	(United Kingdom) Charlie Postins (United States) James Clay	Report
6	R1	(United States) Sebring	(United States) #34 Conquest Racing / JMF Motorsport	**(United States) #92 CrowdStrike Racing by Random Vandals**	(United States) #47 NolaSport	(United States) #58 ACI Motorsports	Report
6	R1	(United States) Sebring	(United States) Michai Stephens (Canada) Jesse Webb	**(United States) Kevin Boehm** **(United States) Kenton Koch**	(United States) Jason Hart (United States) Matt Travis	(United States) Richard Edge (United States) Matt Halcome	Report
6	R2	(United States) Sebring	(United States) #999 TGR Hanley Motorsports	**(United States) #34 Conquest Racing / JMF Motorsport**	(United States) #2 Flying Lizard Motorsports	(United States) #72 KRUGSPEED	Report
6	R2	(United States) Sebring	(United States) Daniel Hanley (Canada) Parker Thompson	**(United States) Michai Stephens** **(Canada) Jesse Webb**	(United States) Jason Bell (United States) Michael Cooper	(United States) Anthony Geraci (United States) Jaden Lander	Report
7	R1	(United States) Indianapolis	(United States) #34 Conquest Racing / JMF Motorsport	**(United States) #92 CrowdStrike Racing by Random Vandals**	(United States) #24 Heart of Racing Team	(United States) #26 Heart of Racing Team	Report
7	R1	(United States) Indianapolis	(United States) Michai Stephens (Canada) Jesse Webb	**(United States) Kevin Boehm** **(United States) Kenton Koch**	(Canada) Roman De Angelis (United States) Gray Newell	(United States) Hannah Grisham (New Zealand) Rianna O'Meara-Hunt	Report
7	R2	(United States) Indianapolis	(United States) #2 Flying Lizard Motorsports	**(United States) #34 Conquest Racing / JMF Motorsport**	(United States) #68 TGR Smooge Racing	(United States) #26 Heart of Racing Team	Report
7	R2	(United States) Indianapolis	(United States) Jason Bell (United States) Michael Cooper	**(United States) Michai Stephens** **(Canada) Jesse Webb**	(United States) Kevin Conway (United States) Aaron Telitz	(United States) Hannah Grisham (New Zealand) Rianna O'Meara-Hunt	Report

== Championship standings ==
Scoring system

Position	**1st**	**2nd**	**3rd**	**4th**	**5th**	**6th**	**7th**	**8th**	**9th**	**10th**
Points	25	18	15	12	10	8	6	4	2	1

=== Drivers' championship ===
Pos.	Drivers	Team	SON (United States)		NOL (United States)		COA (United States)		VIR (United States)		ROA (United States)		SEB (United States)			IMS (United States)		Points
Pos.	Drivers	Team	RC1	RC2	RC1	RC2	RC1	RC2	RC1	RC2	RC1	RC2	RC1	RC2	RC3	RC1	RC2	Points
Silver Cup
1	(United States) Zac Anderson	(United States) Auto Technic Racing	7	8	1	C	1	3	2	1	3	1	2	2	3	5	20	259
2	(United States) Michai Stephens (Canada) Jesse Webb	(United States) Conquest Racing / JWF Motorsports	2	6	2	C	2	33	12	3	1	7	4	4	1	25	1	238
3	(United States) Kevin Boehm (United States) Kenton Koch	(United States) CrowdStrike Racing by Random Vandals	3	39	14	C	4	37	1	2	2	2	3	1	2	1	6	227
4	(United States) John Capestro-Dubets	(United States) Auto Technic Racing	7	8	1	C	1	3	2	1			2	2	3	5	20	219
5	(United States) Chandler Hull	(Canada) STR38 Motorsports	10	9	6	C	3	38	6	4	22	25	7	21	4	6	Ret	152
6	(United States) Andrew Davis (United States) Francis Selldorff	(United States) ACI Motorsports	4	12	11	C	11	34	10	9	Ret	16	22	8	5	4	3	145
7	(United States) Daniel Hanley (Canada) Parker Thompson	(United States) TGR Hanley Motorsports	Ret	30	35	C	7	2	DNS	DNS	10	4	1	3	8	14	Ret	142
8	(United States) Harry Gottsacker	(Canada) STR38 Motorsports			6	C			6	4	22	25	7	21	4	6	Ret	108
9	(United States) Tyler Gonzalez (United States) Tyler Maxson	(United States) TGR Copeland Motorsports	21	11	Ret	C	5	11	9	11								63
10	(United States) Jon Miller	(Canada) STR38 Motorsports	10	9			3	38										44
11	(United States) Dominic Starkweather (United States) Chris Walsh	(United States) Valkyrie Velocity Racing	12	16	29	C	30	27										40
12	(United Kingdom) Jamie Day (United States) Rory van der Steur	(United States) Van der Steur Racing									8	31						18
13	(United States) Andy Lee (United States) Elias Sabo	(United States) Flying Lizard Motorsports													27			6
Pro-Am Cup
1	(United States) Jason Hart (United States) Matt Travis	(United States) NolaSport	1	5	32	C	9	5	5	10	21	8	6	5	Ret	3	7	190
2	(United States) Tyler McQuarrie (United States) James Walker Jr.	(United States) Bimmerworld Racing	11	10	5	C	Ret	4	3	6	6	3	8	7	13	Ret	9	189
3	(United States) Andy Lee (United States) Elias Sabo	(United States) Flying Lizard Motorsports	6	7	7	C	15	8	11	13	7	9	5	Ret		19	13	135
4	(United States) Gray Newell	(United States) Heart of Racing Team	34	22	3	C	25	39	DNS	18	4	14	10	Ret	20	2	5	119
4	(Canada) Roman De Angelis	(United States) Heart of Racing Team			3	C	25	39	DNS	18	4	14	10	Ret	20	2	5	119
5	(United States) Ross Chouest (Canada) Aaron Povoledo	(United States) Chouest Povoledo Racing	5	2	4	C	Ret	12	13	8	Ret	13	24	27	29	21	8	118
6	(Netherlands) Kay van Berlo (United States) Curt Swearingin	(United States) ACI Motorsports	43	Ret	28	C	17	6	29	7	5	19	9	22	7	26	4	116
7	(United States) Kevin Conway	(United States) TGR Smooge Racing	9	38	8	C	6	7	16	28	30	20	18	28	DNS	7	2	114
8	(United States) Colin Garrett (Denmark) Johan Schwartz	(United States) Rooster Hall Racing	20	26	9	C	8	31	7	27	27	10	Ret	9	15	9	11	103
9	(United States) Jason Bell (United States) Michael Cooper	(United States) Flying Lizard Motorsports					10	1						6	6	Ret	Ret	80
10	(United States) John Geesbreght	(United States) TGR Smooge Racing	9	38	8	C	6	7	16	28	30	20	18	28	DNS			74
11	(United States) Colin Harrison (United States) Eric Powell	(United States) TechSport Racing	28	4	20	C	23	40	27	Ret	DNS	30	15	29	10	17	19	58
12	(United States) Bryan Heitkotter (United States) Tyler Stone	(United States) TechSport Racing	25	13	37	C	Ret	20	32	24			30	16	7	10	27	42
13	(United States) Carter Fartuch (United States) Matthew Forbush	(United States) TGR Skip Barber Racing School	35	3	26	C	33	26	28	Ret	14	22	17	Ret	32	24	Ret	41
14	(United States) Aaron Telitz	(United States) TGR Smooge Racing														7	2	40
15	(Monaco) Cédric Sbirrazzuoli (Brazil) Custodio Toledo	(United States) Conquest Racing									17	26	19	14	17	16	22	32
16	(United States) Tom Dyer (United States) Todd Parriott	(United States) GMG Racing									20	12				11	21	25
17	(United States) Rob Ferriol	(United States) Valkyrie Velocity Racing	8	17	24	C	29	15										18
18	(United States) Jaden Conwright (Indonesia) Anderson Tanoto	(United States) SP Motorsports	17	36			22	10										16
19	(Canada) Mac Clark	(United States) Valkyrie Velocity Racing	8	17														14
20=	(Netherlands) Jeroen Bleekemolen (United States) Tim Pappas	(United States) Black Swan Racing	Ret		12	C	Ret	36										6
20=	(United States) Jay Logan (United States) Alec Udell	(United States) GMG Racing					19	32										6
21=	(United States) Peter Atwater (United States) Luca Mars	(United States) JTR Motorsports Engineering	Ret	14														4
21=	(United States) Will Owen	(United States) Valkyrie Velocity Racing			24	C	29	15										4
22	(United States) Brady Behrman (United States) Coby Shield	(United States) Van der Steur Racing	Ret	19														1
	(United States) Ian James	(United States) Heart of Racing Team	34	22														0
	(United States) Todd Coleman (United States) Billy Johnson	(United States) Archangel Motorsports	Ret	35	Ret	C												0
	(United States) Joey DaSilva (United States) Jesse Love	(United States) TGR Smooge Racing					31	23										1
Am Cup
1	(United Kingdom) Charlie Postins (United States) James Clay	(United States) Bimmerworld Racing	15	37	10	C	13	9	4	5	9	5	11	12	11	Ret	14	256
2	(United States) Robert Mau (New Zealand) Chris Allen	(Canada) STR38 Motorsports	22	15	17	C	12	13	8	26	26	15	14	11	14	13	16	174
3	(United States) Terry Borcheller (United States) Nick Shanny	(United States) TGR Carrus Callas Raceteam	14	1	19	C	27	17	26	15	15	24	16	Ret	21	12	12	136
4	(United States) Anthony Geraci (United States) Jaden Lander	(United States) KRUGSPEED			13	C	35	35	30	12	12	21	Ret	13	9	20	23	106
5	(United States) Paul Sparta (United States) Al Carter	(United States) Random Vandals Racing	23	Ret	25	C	16	19	14	21	11	11	13	Ret	22	22	26	98
6	(United States) Hannah Grisham (New Zealand) Rianna O'Meara-Hunt	(United States) Heart of Racing Team	Ret	25	30	C	18	24	19	16	28	DNS	26	15	Ret	8	10	92
7	(United States) Satakal Khalsa (United States) Rob Walker	(United States) Auto Technic Racing	29	31	38	C	14	18	18	Ret	16	6	21	25	23	15	15	89
8	(United States) Roland Krainz (United States) Austin Krainz	(United States) RennSport1	18	29	16	C	28	21	24	31	25	18	12	26	12	23	17	79
9	(Colombia) Nelson Calle (Spain) Juan Pablo Martinez	(United States) NolaSport	19	18	34	C	26	22	15	29	29	Ret	25	17	18	18	18	75
10	(United States) Richard Edge (United States) Matt Halcome	(United States) ACI Motorsports	30	33	23	C	20	28	20	30	23	17	20	10	19			66
11	(United States) Michael Auriemma (United States) Tommy Johnson	(United States) RENNtech Motorsports	32	24	15	C	21	29	21	25	13	27	23	19	25	Ret	24	52
12	(United States) Paul Kiebler (United States) Jon Branam	(United States) TR3 Racing	24	20	18	C	34	14	25	17								45
13	(United States) Brady Behrman (United States) Coby Shield	(United States) Van der Steur Racing			22	C	24	16	17	14								43
14	(United States) Joey DaSilva	(United States) TGR Smooge Racing	16	21	Ret	C			23	19	24	Ret	28	20	24	Ret	Ret	32
15	(United States) Isabella Robusto	(United States) TGR Smooge Racing	16	21					23	19								28
16	(Brazil) Paulo Carcasci (Brazil) Custodio Toledo	(United States) Conquest Racing	13	27	33	C												27
17	(United States) David Peterman (United States) Lee Carpentier	(United States) NolaSport	31	34	Ret	C	32	25	31	23	19	23	29	18	26	Ret	25	15
18	(United States) Matt Joffe (United States) Grant Maiman	(United States) Extreme Velocity Motorsports			21	C			22	20								9
19=	(United States) Sean Gibbons (United States) Sam Owen	(United States) Valkyrie Velocity Racing	27	23	31	C	Ret	Ret										8
19=	(United States) Christian Ruppel (United States) Eric Zitza	(United States) Zotz Racing/CCDP Racing	33	Ret	36	C	36	30	34	22	18	29	27	23	28			8
20	(United States) Tony Ave	(United States) TGR Smooge Racing			Ret	C					24	Ret	28	20	24	Ret	Ret	4
21	(United States) Robb Holland (United States) Alain Stad	(Germany) Rotek Racing	26	DNS	27	C												1
	(United States) Kyle Washington (United States) James Sofronas	(United States) GMG Racing	Ret	32														0
	(United States) Michael Dayton (United States) Jason Griscavage	(United States) Rooster Hall Racing							33	Ret								0
	(United States) Nick Longhi (United States) Kaia Teo	(United States) Crucial Motorsports									Ret	28	30	30				0
	(Canada) Thomas Collingwood (United States) John Tecce	(United States) BGB Motorsports											24	31				0
Pos.	Drivers	Team	SON (United States)		NOL (United States)		COA (United States)		VIR (United States)		ROA (United States)		SEB (United States)			IMS (United States)		Points

Key
Colour	Result
Gold	Race winner
Silver	2nd place
Bronze	3rd place
Green	Points finish
Blue	Non-points finish
Blue	Non-classified finish (NC)
Purple	Did not finish (Ret)
Black	Disqualified (DSQ)
Black	Excluded (EX)
White	Did not start (DNS)
White	Race cancelled (C)
White	Withdrew (WD)
Blank	Did not participate

**Bold** – Pole
Italics – Fastest Lap
