= Danny Dyszelski =

American racing driver

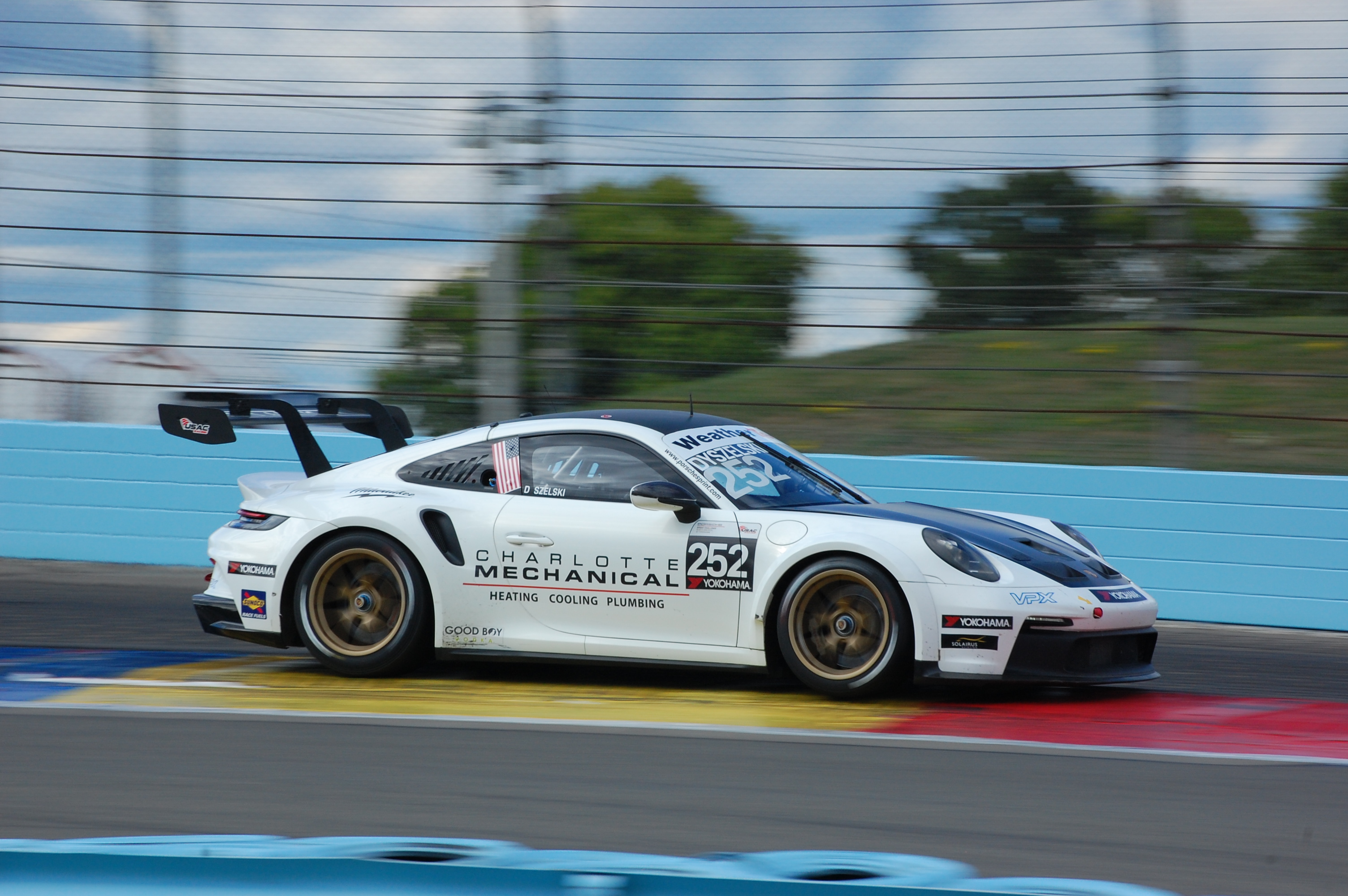
- Dyszelski at Watkins Glen in 2025
- Nationality: (United States) American
- Born: Daniel Dyszelski IV; April 10, 2008 (age 18) Lake Wylie, South Carolina, United States

USF Pro 2000 Championship career
- Debut season: 2024
- Current team: Turn 3 Motorsport
- Categorisation: FIA Silver
- Car number: 3
- Starts: 3
- Wins: 0
- Podiums: 0
- Poles: 0
- Fastest laps: 0
- Best finish: 26th in 2023

Previous series
- 2022–23: USF2000 Championship

Daniel Dyszelski IV (born April 10, 2008) is an American racing driver. He is currently competing in the 2024 USF Pro 2000 Championship driving for Turn 3 Motorsport. He previously competed in the USF2000 Championship driving for Velocity Racing Development.

== Career ==
=== Early career ===
Dyszelski’s initial exposure to motorsport came from accompanying his father to track days at a young age, where he developed an early passion for racing that he later pursued through karting and other disciplines. As a karter, he competed in several classes, often simultaneously. Dyszelski competed in all major U.S. series, including USPKS, SKUSA, ROK Cup USA, and WKA, before stepping into open-wheel racing.

=== USF2000 Championship ===
==== 2022 ====
On February 4, 2022, it was announced that Dyszelski would make his open-wheel racing debut in the 2022 USF2000 Championship driving for Jay Howard Driver Development. He would compete in 14 out of the total 18 races that season and finish 16th in the championship.

==== 2023 ====
Dyszelski would return to the championship for the 2023 season driving for Velocity Racing Development. He would not contest the seventh round held in Toronto. Dyszelski would also not compete at the final round held at Portland since he would move up to compete in the final round of the USF Pro 2000 Championship.

=== USF Pro 2000 Championship ===
==== 2023 ====
On August 31, 2023, Dyszelski announced that he would join Turn 3 Motorsport to compete in the final round of the 2023 USF Pro 2000 Championship held at Portland International Raceway. He would retire in the first race, but finished a best of 9th in race 3.

==== 2024 ====
In November 2023, it was announced that Dyszelski would move up to USF Pro 2000 Championship full-time driving for Turn 3 Motorsport.

== Racing record ==
=== Career summary ===
Season	Series	Team	Races	Wins	Poles	F/Laps	Podiums	Points	Position
2022	USF2000 Championship	Jay Howard Driver Development	14	0	0	0	0	99	16th
2022	Radical World Finals - Pro 1500	WISKO Racing	4	1	0	1	3	0	**2nd**
2023	USF2000 Championship	Velocity Racing Development	13	0	0	1	0	141	13th
2023	USF Pro 2000 Championship	Turn 3 Motorsport	3	0	0	0	0	27	26th
2023	Radical Cup North America - Pro 1500	WISKO Racing	18	?	?	?	?	?	**2nd**
2024	USF Pro 2000 Championship	Turn 3 Motorsport	18	0	1	0	2	230	7th
2024	GT4 America Series - Pro-Am	RySpec Racing	2	0	0	0	0	0	NC†
2024	GT4 America Series - Silver	VPX Motorsport	4	0	0	0	0	0	NC†
2025	GT4 America Series - Silver	VPX Motorsport							
2026	Michelin Pilot Challenge - GS	VPX Motorsports							
2026	GT World Challenge America - Pro-Am	RS1	3	0	1	0	2	60	5th

* Season still in progress.

=== American open-wheel racing results ===
==== USF2000 Championship ====
(key) (Races in bold indicate pole position) (Races in italics indicate fastest lap) (Races with * indicate most race laps led)

Year	Team	1	2	3	4	5	6	7	8	9	10	11	12	13	14	15	16	17	18	Rank	Points
2022	Jay Howard Driver Development	STP; 1	STP; 2	ALA; 1; 19	ALA; 2; 19	IMS; 1; 12	IMS; 2; 20	IMS; 3; 22	IRP; 14	ROA; 1; 12	ROA; 2; 20	MOH; 1; 10	MOH; 2; 11	MOH; 3; 16	TOR; 1	TOR; 2	POR; 1; 6	POR; 2; 12	POR; 3; 8	16th	99
2023	Velocity Racing Development	STP; 1; 16	STP; 2; 7	SEB; 1; 10	SEB; 2; 17	IMS; 1; 4	IMS; 2; 8	IMS; 3; 7	IRP; 16	ROA; 1; 10	ROA; 2; 8	MOH; 1; 12	MOH; 2; 15	MOH; 3; 8	TOR; 1	TOR; 2	POR; 1	POR; 2	POR; 3	13th	141

==== USF Pro 2000 Championship ====
(key) (Races in bold indicate pole position) (Races in italics indicate fastest lap) (Races with * indicate most race laps led)

Year	Team	1	2	3	4	5	6	7	8	9	10	11	12	13	14	15	16	17	18	Rank	Points
2023	Turn 3 Motorsport	STP; 1	STP; 2	SEB; 1	SEB; 2	IMS; 1	IMS; 2	IRP	ROA; 1	ROA; 2	MOH; 1	MOH; 2	TOR; 1	TOR; 2	COTA; 1	COTA; 1	POR; 1; 15	POR; 2; 12	POR; 3; 9	26th	27
2024	Turn 3 Motorsport	STP; 1; 19	STP; 2; 3	LOU; 1; 4	LOU; 2; 19	LOU; 3; 8	IMS; 1; 11	IMS; 2; 7	IMS; 3; 19	IRP; 4	ROA; 1; 6	ROA; 2; 5	ROA; 3; 4	MOH; 1; 18	MOH; 2; 3	**TOR**; **1**; 13	TOR; 2; 16	POR; 1; 7	POR; 2; 8	7th	230
