= Hannah Greenemeier =

American racing driver (born 2002)

- Nationality: (United States) American
- Born: August 8, 2002 (age 24) Parker, Colorado, U.S.

Michelin Pilot Challenge career
- Debut season: 2026
- Current team: Heart of Racing Team
- Categorisation: FIA Silver
- Car number: 26
- Starts: 10
- Wins: 0
- Podiums: 0
- Poles: 2
- Fastest laps: 0
- Best finish: 4th (GS) in 2026

Previous series
- 2024–2025 2023: GT4 America Series; Formula 4 United States Championship

Hannah Greenemeier (born August 8, 2002) is an American racing driver who last competed in the GS class of Michelin Pilot Challenge for Heart of Racing Team.

== Personal life ==
Greenemeier is the daughter of Gunnar and Lynette Greenemeier, who owned Carstar Collision Center and Highland Carstar Auto Body, prior to selling them in late 2022 to focus on their daughter's racing career.

== Career ==
Greenemeier began karting at the age of five. Starting out in micro karts, Greenemeier won the 2012 Southeast Karting Challenge, as well as the GoPro Motorplex Karting Challenge the following year, earning her an invite to the RMC Grand Finals. In her first year of junior karts in 2016, Greenemeier was runner-up in the Can-Am Karting Challenge and Challenge of the Americas standings, before winning the Can-Am title and securing runner-up honors in the US Open Grand Nationals to clinch another invitation to the RMC Grand Finals. Moving up to senior karts in 2018, Greenemeier was runner-up in the US Open Grand Nationals, as well as Challenge of the Americas, to earn her third invite to the RMC Grand Finals. Continuing in senior karts until 2021, Greenemeier won the 2019 SKUSA California Prokart Challenge title, before becoming the first female to clinch the SKUSA Pro Tour title in X30 Senior two years later.

In 2022, Greenemeier was a finalist for the Spec MX-5 Shootout, and tested W Series machinery, as well as winning the PMH Powering Diversity Scholarship ahead of her step-up to the Formula 4 United States Championship in 2023 with Crosslink/Kiwi Motorsport. In her only season in single-seaters, Greenemeier took a best result of sixth in race two at VIR to take 17th in overall points. That year, Greenemeier was named as a finalist for the Mazda MX-5 Cup Shootout.

Moving to GT4 competition for 2024, Grenemeier joined Heart of Racing Team's all-female project to race an Aston Martin Vantage AMR GT4 with Hannah Grisham in GT4 America. The pair started off with an Am class win at Sonoma, made a one-off start in Pro-Am, and saw out the season in Silver, taking a best overall result of third at Barber en route to ninth in points. Returning to GT4 America for 2025, Greenemeier and Grisham took a lone Silver Cup podium at the Lone Star Enduro on their way to a fifth place overall.

In 2026, Greenemeier, Grisham and Heart of Racing Team switched to the Grand Sport class of the Michelin Pilot Challenge. The two drivers combined for four pole positions—Grisham at Watkins Glen and Road America, and Greenemeier at Mosport and Indianapolis—but did not score any podium, instead relying on consistency. A trio of sixth-place finishes at Watkins Glen, Indianapolis and Road Atlanta helped the pair end the year fourth in the GS standings.

== Karting record ==
=== Karting career summary ===
Season	Series	Team	Position
2012	Florida Winter Tour — Micro Max		34th
2012	RMC Pan American — Micro Max		8th
2013	Florida Winter Tour — Micro Max		29th
2013	RMC Grand Finals — Micro Max		25th
2014	Florida Winter Tour — Vortex TaG Cadet		34th
2015	Challenge of the Americas — PSL West Mini Max		7th
2016	Challenge of the Americas — Junior Rotax		2nd
2017	Florida Winter Tour — Rotax Junior		8th
2017	Challenge of the Americas — Junior Rotax		2nd
2017	RMC Grand Finals — Junior Max		46th
2018	SKUSA SuperNationals — X30 Senior		36th
2018	RMC Grand Finals — Senior Max		24th
2019	Rotax Stars & Stripes Trophy — Rotax Senior		4th
2019	SKUSA SuperNationals — X30 Senior		12th
2021	SKUSA SuperNationals — X30 Senior		35th
2022	SKUSA Pro Tour — Pro Shifter		10th
2022	SKUSA SuperNationals — Pro Shifter		10th
2023	SKUSA SuperNationals — Pro Shifter		37th
2025	SKUSA SuperNationals — Pro X30		10th
2026	SKUSA Pro Tour — Pro X30		36th

== Racing record ==
=== Racing career summary ===
Season	Series	Team	Races	Wins	Poles	F/Laps	Podiums	Points	Position
2023	Formula 4 United States Championship	Crosslink/Kiwi Motorsport	18	0	0	0	0	17	17th
2024	GT4 America Series – Am	Heart of Racing Team	4	1	0	0	3	65	10th
2024	GT4 America Series – Pro-Am	Heart of Racing Team	1	0	0	0	0	0	25th
2024	GT4 America Series – Silver	Heart of Racing Team	8	0	0	0	2	83	9th
2025	GT4 America Series – Silver	Heart of Racing Team	12	0	0	0	1	125	5th
2026	Michelin Pilot Challenge – GS	Heart of Racing Team	10	0	2	0	0	2130	4th

^{†} As Greenemeier was a guest driver, she was ineligible to score points.

=== Complete Formula 4 United States Championship results ===
(key) (Races in bold indicate pole position) (Races in italics indicate fastest lap)

Year	Team	1	2	3	4	5	6	7	8	9	10	11	12	13	14	15	16	17	18	Pos	Points
2023	Crosslink/Kiwi Motorsport	NOL; 1; 12	NOL; 2; 11	NOL; 3; 16	ROA; 1 Ret	ROA; 2 Ret	ROA; 3 Ret	MOH; 1 Ret	MOH; 2; 18	MOH; 3; 15	NJM; 1; 11	NJM; 2 Ret	NJM; 3; 10	VIR; 1; 7	VIR; 2; 6	VIR; 3; 9	COA; 1; 12	COA; 2; 12	COA; 3; 11	17th	17

=== Complete Michelin Pilot Challenge results ===
(key) (Races in bold indicate pole position) (Races in italics indicate fastest lap)

Year	Entrant	Class	Make	1	2	3	4	5	6	7	8	9	10	Rank	Points
2026	Heart of Racing Team	Grand Sport	Aston Martin Vantage AMR GT4 Evo	DAY; 11	SEB; 17	LGA; 7	MOH; 12	**WGL**; 6	**MOS**; 15	**ELK**; 9	VIR; 8	**IMS**; 6	ATL; 6	4th	2130
