= Hannah Grisham =

American racing driver (born 2000)

- Nationality: (United States) American
- Born: February 14, 2000 (age 26) Glendora, California, U.S.
- Categorisation: FIA Silver

Championship titles
- 2019: NASA SoCal Division – Spec Miata

Hannah Grisham (born February 14, 2000) is an American racing driver who last competed in the Grand Sport class of the Michelin Pilot Challenge for Heart of Racing Team.

== Career ==
Grisham began karting at the age of six, competing until 2015. Racing mainly in her home state of California, Grisham became the second female winner of the IKF Lake Speed Achievement of Excellence in Karting award, as well as the IKF Expert designation after winning two national titles.

In 2016, Grisham made her car racing debut in the Spec Miata class of the NASA SoCal Division, in which she finished eighth overall with a best result of second at Buttonwillow. Continuing in the series for 2017, Grisham took four podiums to claim runner-up honors, as well as being the highest-placed Teen Mazda Challenge entrant. The following year, Grisham once again finished runner-up in the series, before being selected as one of four candidates for the Mazda Road to 24 Shootout.

Continuing in NASA SoCal for 2019, Grisham had a breakout year, taking six wins en route to her maiden title in car racing. Towards the end of the year, Grisham participated in the selection process for the 2020 W Series season at Almería, missing out on the grid, but later appeared as a guest driver in the series' eSports League. During the year, Grisham finished runner-up in the Spec Miata standings of the NASA SoCal Division, participated in the MX-5 Cup Shootout and joined Pirelli North America as a test driver. Grisham then made a one-off appearance in the Mazda MX-5 Cup in 2021, before spending the rest of the year and 2022 competing in the World Racing League.

In late 2022, Grisham was one of two winners of the The Heart of Racing's female talent search and joined the team for the 2023 GT4 America Series. Sharing an Aston Martin Vantage AMR GT4 with Rianna O'Meara-Hunt, the other winner of the shootout, Grisham won both races at Indianapolis to end the year sixth in the Am class. Partnering Hannah Greenemeier for her sophomore season in 2024, Grisham started off with an Am class win at Sonoma, made a one-off start in Pro-Am, and saw out the season in Silver, taking a best overall result of third at Barber en route to ninth in points. Towards the end of the year, Grisham made a Lamborghini Super Trofeo North America cameo at Indianapolis for Forty7 Motorsports, winning race one in Pro-Am with Keawn Tandon.

At the beginning of 2025, Grisham made her GT3 debut with Heart of Racing by SPS at the Dubai 24 Hour, finishing tenth overall in the team's Mercedes-AMG GT3 Evo alongside Ian James, Gray Newell and Zacharie Robichon. She then starred at the 12 Hours of Mugello, with second overall and victory in GT3 Am. Returning to GT4 America for the rest of the year, Grisham and Greenemeier took a lone Silver Cup podium at the Lone Star Enduro on their way to a fifth-place points finish.

In 2026, Grisham, Greenemeier and Heart of Racing Team switched to the Grand Sport class of the Michelin Pilot Challenge, with Grisham selected for the Aston Martin Racing Driver Academy. In the fifth round of the season at Watkins Glen, Grisham became the first woman in 19 years to qualify on overall pole, before leading the first half of the race and taking a season-best result of sixth. Following that, Grisham took pole once again at Road America, before matching her season-best result at both Indianapolis and Road Atlanta to end the year fourth in the GS standings.

== Karting record ==
=== Karting career summary ===
Season	Series	Team	Position
2012	California Pro Kart Challenge – TaG Junior		23rd
2014	SKUSA SuperNationals – TaG Junior	Mack Motorsports	63rd
2015	SKUSA SuperNationals – TaG Senior	Mack Motorsports	50th

== Racing record ==
=== Career summary ===
Season	Series	Team	Races	Wins	Poles	F/Laps	Podiums	Points	Position
2016	NASA SoCal Division – Spec Miata	Morning Star Racing						357	8th
2017	NASA SoCal Division – Spec Miata	Morning Star Racing					4	796	**2nd**
2018	NASA SoCal Division – Spec Miata	Morning Star Racing	11	2			8	820	**2nd**
2019	NASA SoCal Division – Spec Miata	Morning Star Racing/RDR Racing	12	6			9	860	**1st**
2020	NASA SoCal Division – Spec Miata	Morning Star Racing	6	2			4	441	**2nd**
2021	Mazda MX-5 Cup	Hixon Motorsports	2	0	0	0	0	220	35th
2021	World Racing League	Team Sentinel							
2022	World Racing League	Team Hagerty Drivers Club							
2023	GT4 America Series – Am	Heart of Racing Team	13	2	2	0	2	92	6th
2024	GT4 America Series – Am	Heart of Racing Team	4	1	0	0	3	65	10th
2024	GT4 America Series – Pro-Am	Heart of Racing Team	1	0	0	0	0	0	25th
2024	GT4 America Series – Silver	Heart of Racing Team	8	0	0	0	2	83	9th
2024	Lamborghini Super Trofeo North America – Pro-Am	Forty7 Motorsports	2	1	0	0	2	26	15th
2025	Middle East Trophy – GT3 Am	Heart of Racing by SPS	1	0	0	0	0	23	NC
2025	24H Series – GT3 Am	Heart of Racing by SPS	1	1	0	0	1	40	NC
2025	GT4 America Series – Silver	Heart of Racing Team	12	0	0	0	1	125	5th
2026	Michelin Pilot Challenge – GS	Heart of Racing Team	10	0	2	1	0	2130	4th

=== Complete Michelin Pilot Challenge results ===
(key) (Races in bold indicate pole position) (Races in italics indicate fastest lap)

Year	Entrant	Class	Make	1	2	3	4	5	6	7	8	9	10	Rank	Points
2026	Heart of Racing Team	Grand Sport	Aston Martin Vantage AMR GT4 Evo	DAY; 11	SEB; 17	LGA; 7	MOH; 12	**WGL**; 6	**MOS**; 15	**ELK**; 9	VIR; 8	**IMS**; 6	ATL; 6	4th	2130
