= Matt Bell (American racing driver) =

American racing driver

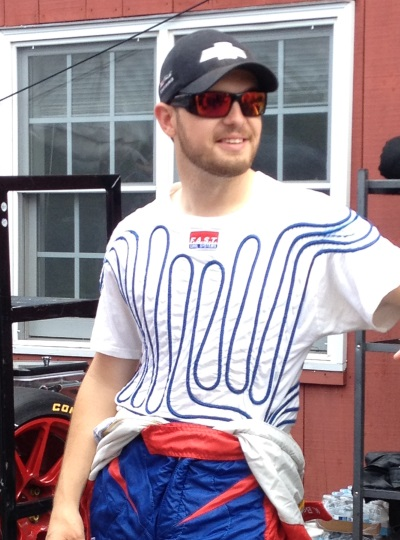
- Bell in 2014
- Nationality: (United States) American
- Born: August 31, 1985 (age 41) Mountain View, California, U.S.

Continental Tire SportsCar Challenge (GS) career
- Current team: Stevenson Motorsports
- Categorisation: FIA Silver
- Car number: 9
- Co-driver: Lawson Aschenbach
- Former teams: Turner Motorsport
- Starts: 76 (Continental)
- Wins: 8 (Continental)
- Poles: 11 (Continental)

NASCAR O'Reilly Auto Parts Series career
- 3 races run over 2 years
- 2017 position: 83rd
- Best finish: 83rd (2012, 2017)
- First race: 2012 Sargento 200 (Road America)
- Last race: 2017 Mid-Ohio Challenge (Mid-Ohio)
Wins	Top tens	Poles
0	0	0
- Statistics up to date as of August 13, 2017.

Matthew Elwin Bell (born August 31, 1985) is an American professional race car driver. Bell was born in Mountain View, California. Although Bell grew up in Los Altos, California, he attended Mountain View High School from which he graduated in 2004. After graduation, he pursued transportation design at the Academy of Art University, San Francisco, California. Shortly after his third year of attendance, Bell joined Grand America Road Racing Association Koni Challenge Series in 2008 and raced with Turner Motorsport. For two years he raced for Turner Motorsport. Bell is racing for Stevenson Motorsport in the 2010 No. 6 Sunoco Camaro. Bell resides in San Mateo, California and when not racing is an instructor at Jim Russell Racing School.

== Racing career ==
In 2012, Bell made his debut in NASCAR competition, driving the No. 4 Chevrolet in the Nationwide Series for JD Motorsports at Road America. Five years later, Bell returned to the series – now the Xfinity Series – at Mid-Ohio Sports Car Course, where he drove the No. 90 for King Autosport. His car suffered from brake issues and he violently crashed into the tire barrier in turn one; he finished 38th.

== Motorsports career results ==
=== NASCAR ===
(key) (Bold – Pole position awarded by qualifying time. Italics – Pole position earned by points standings or practice time. * – Most laps led.)

==== Xfinity Series ====
NASCAR Xfinity Series results
Year	Team	No.	Make	1	2	3	4	5	6	7	8	9	10	11	12	13	14	15	16	17	18	19	20	21	22	23	24	25	26	27	28	29	30	31	32	33	NXSC	Pts	Ref
2012	JD Motorsports	4	Chevy	DAY	PHO	LVS	BRI	CAL	TEX	RCH	TAL	DAR	IOW	CLT	DOV	MCH	ROA; 34	KEN	DAY	NHA	CHI	IND	IOW														83rd	18	
2012	Go Green Racing	39	Ford																					GLN; 36	CGV	BRI	ATL	RCH	CHI	KEN	DOV	CLT	KAN	TEX	PHO	HOM	83rd	18	
2017	King Autosport	90	Chevy	DAY	ATL	LVS	PHO	CAL	TEX	BRI	RCH	TAL	CLT	DOV	POC	MCH	IOW	DAY	KEN	NHA	IND	IOW	GLN	MOH; 38	BRI	ROA	DAR	RCH	CHI	KEN	DOV	CLT	KAN	TEX	PHO	HOM	83rd	1	

=== Sports car racing ===
(key) Bold – pole position (overall finish/class finish).

==== Continental Tire Sports Car Challenge ====
Year	Team	Class	1	2	3	4	5	6	7	8	9	10	11	12	Rank	Points
2008	Turner Motorsport	ST	DIS; 15	LRP; 42	MOS; 22	MOH; 15	WGI; 9	IWO; 2	TRR; 21	NJP; 14	UTA; 11	VIR; 4			12th	170
2009	Turner Motorsport	GS	DIS; 1	**HOM**; 24	**NJP**; 10	**LS**; 15	LRP; 3	**WGI**; 2	**MOH**; 5	BAR; 5	TRR; 1	UTA; 2	VIR; 4		3rd	288
2009	Compass360 Racing	ST	DIS	HOM	NJP	LS	LRP	WGI	MOH	BAR; 10	TRR	UTA	VIR		78th	21
2010	Stevenson Motorsports	GS	DIS; 5	HOM; 32	BAR; 14	VIR; 2	LRP; 19	WGI; 24	MOH; 18	NJP; 6	TRR; 3	UTA; 15			7th	178
2011	Stevenson Motorsports	GS	DIS; 28	HMS; 11	BAR; 5	VIR; 9	LRP; 4	WGI; 2	ROA; 1	LS; 1	NJP; 14	MOH; 33			8th	218
2012	Stevenson Motorsports	GS	DIS; 17	BAR	HMS	NJP; 12	MOH; 5	ROA; 6	WGI; 4	IMS; 8	LS; 1	LRP; 4			9th	198
2013	Stevenson Motorsports	GS	DIS; 6	COTA; 10	BAR; 2	ATL; 1	MOH; 3	WGI; 6	IMS; 20	ROA; 17	KAS; 1	LS; 2	LRP; 2		2nd	289
2014	Stevenson Motorsports	GS	DIS; 23	SEB; 8	LS; 11	LRP; 3	KAS; 15	WGI; 4	MOS; 1	IMS; 19	ROA; 14	VIR; 16	COTA; 17	ATL; 18	17th	204
2015	Stevenson Motorsports	GS	DIS; 3	**SEB**; 2	**LS**; 10	WGI; 5	MOS; 4	LRP; 5	ROA; 12	VIR; 3	COTA; 8	ATL; 8			4th	260

==== Rolex Sports Car Series ====
Year	Team	Class	1	2	3	4	5	6	7	8	9	10	11	12	13	Rank	Points
2010	Stevenson Motorsports	GT	DIS; 10	HOM	BAR	VIR	LRP	WGI	MOH	DIS	NJP	WGI	MON	UTA		21st	49
2010	Doran Racing	DP	DIS	VIR	NJP; 6	LAG	WGI	MOH	DIS	BAR	WGI	MON	UTA; 7	HOM		21st	49
2011	Doran Racing	DP	DIS; 17	HOM	BAR	VIR	LRP	WGI; 6	ROA							18th	61
2011	Michael Shank Racing	DP								LAG; 11	NJP	WGI	MON	MOH		18th	61
2012	Stevenson Motorsports	GT	DIS; 15	BAR	HOM	NJP	DET	MOH	ROA	WGI; 5	IMS; 17	WGI	MON	LAG	LRP	35th	56

=== American Le Mans Series ===
Year	Team	Class	1	2	3	4	5	6	7	8	9	10	Rank	Points
2009	LG Motorsports	GT2	SEB	STP	LBGP	UTA	LRP	MOH	ROA	MOS	ATL; 8	MRLS	**32nd**	**13**
