= Michael Cooper (racing driver) =

American race car driver (born 1989)

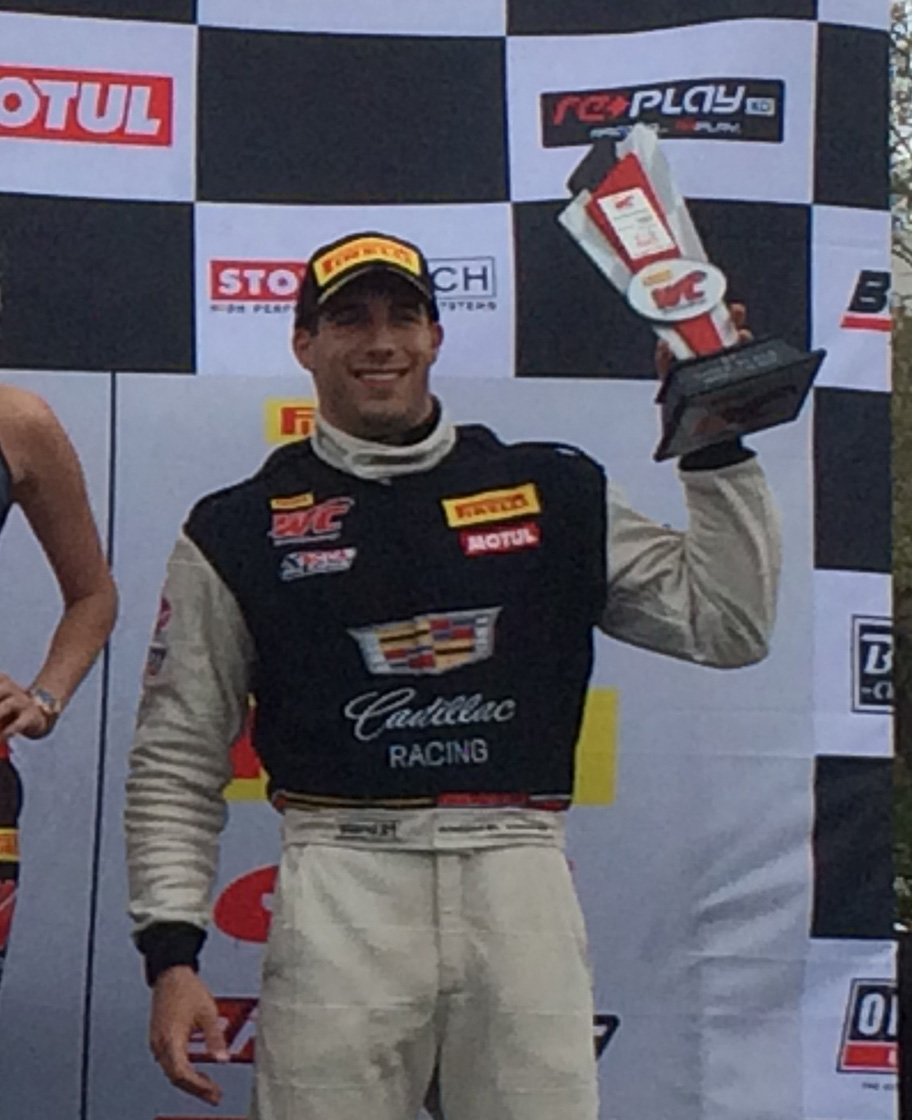
- Nationality: (United States) American
- Born: September 1, 1989 (age 37) Syosset, New York, United States

Pirelli World Challenge career
- Categorisation: FIA Silver (until 2016, 2022–); FIA Gold (2017–2021)
- Former teams: Cadillac Racing, Blackdog Racing
- Championships: 4
- Wins: 19
- Podiums: 37

Previous series
- Pirelli World Challenge, Playboy Mazda MX–5 Cup, Skip Barber Racing School

Championship titles
- 2011 2012 2015: Playboy Mazda Mx-5 Cup; Pirelli World Challenge TC Champion; GTS Champion
- Statistics up to date as of October 11, 2017.

Michael Cooper (born September 1, 1989) is an American race car driver who currently competes in the Pirelli World Challenge. He resides in Huntington, New York, and also has a business management degree from at NYIT (New York Institute of Technology), and a nutrition degree from Long Island University.

== Racing career ==
=== Early career ===
In 2009, Cooper's brother signed him up for the Bob Lutz Cadillac CTS-V Challenge driving competition. In wet conditions at Monticello Motor Club, Cooper was the fastest amateur, gaining the attention of GM Factory Driver Johnny O'Connell. From there, Cooper began his racing career at the age of 19 at Skip Barber Racing School, racing in the Mazdaspeed Challenge in 2010.

After winning several races in the Skip Barber series, Cooper stepped into the Playboy Mazda MX-5 Cup for his first season of professional racing. He won the season opening event, and went on to finish fourth in the championship, narrowly missing out on rookie of the year honors.

In 2011, Cooper won the Playboy Maxda MX-5 Cup driver championship with six poles and five wins in nine races. As a result of winning the championship, He was awarded a full season ride for the following year in the Pirelli World Challenge Touring Car (TC) division.

In similar fashion to 2011, Cooper dominated the Touring Car class in 2012, winning six out of 14 races, only finishing outside of the top five one time, and ultimately claiming the drivers championship. For 2013, Cooper did not have a full-time ride and missed the first 3 rounds of the Pirelli World Challenge touring car schedule.

Later in 2013, Cooper had the opportunity to step into a GT class car for the first time, qualifying ninth in the CRP Racing Hawk Nissan at Mid-Ohio Sports Car Course and retiring after only a few laps with a mechanical failure. 2014 was more of the same for Cooper, and without a full-time ride, he competed in his first GTS class races at Miller Motorsports Park finishing in eighth and fourth place for Blackdog Speedshop.

In 2015, Cooper made his full season debut in the GTS class of Pirelli World Challenge in the Blackdog Speedshop Z/28.R, winning only his second race of the season. He went on to win the GTS championship with four race wins and two additional podium finishes. In 2016, GM appointed Cooper as a factory driver, and hired him to race alongside Johnny O'Connell in the Pirelli World Challenge, racing the Cadillac Racing ATS-V.R. With two wins and an additional seven podiums, Cooper finished third in the championship. The following season, Cooper returned to the Pirelli World Challenge Cadillac Racing program for another full season to include the Sprint and SprintX championships. Cooper was paired with Jordan Taylor for the SprintX Championship, and the duo captured the 2017 Championship at Circuit of the Americas.

Shortly after capturing the Sprint-X championship, Cooper went on to sweep the final Sprint race weekend of the year at Sonoma Raceway. After the 2017 season, Cadillac Racing announced an end to the program, leaving Cooper a free agent.

For 2018, Cooper was announced as one of the drivers for the Callaway Competition race team and their GT3 homologated C7 Corvette in the Pirelli World Challenge GT class. However, he was released from his contract in February 2018, before the season ever started due to the teams inability to field two cars.

Cooper would continue to drive a partial GT4 sprint-x season in 2018 with teammate Tony Gaples at Blackdog Speed Shop.

== Results ==
=== Pirelli World Challenge ===
Year	Team	Car	Class	1	2	3	4	5	6	7	8	9	10	11	12	13	14	15	16	17	18	19	20	Rank	Points
2012	Atlanta Motorsports Group	MAZDASPEED3	TC	SPGP; 1	SPGP; 1	UTA; 4	UTA; 1	UTA; 5	LAG; 5	MOS; 2	MOS; 1	MOS; 4	MOH; 1	MOH; DNF	SONO; 3	SONO; 2	SONO; 1							**1st**	
2013	Atlanta Motorsports Group	MAZDASPEED3	TC	AUS -	AUS -	AUS -	LRP; 13	LRP; DNS	LRP; 10	TOR; 1	TOR; 1	MOH; 1	MOH; 1	SONO; 9	SONO; DNS	HOU; 3	HOU; 7							**5th**	
2014	Blackdog Speedshop	Camaro ZL1	GTS	SPGP -	LBGP -	BAR -	BAR -	DGP -	DGP -	ROA -	ROA -	TOR -	TOR -	MOH -	MOH -	SONO -	SONO -	UTA; 8	UTA; 4					**27th**	
2015	Blackdog Speedshop	Camaro Z/28.R	GTS	AUS; 8	AUS; 1	SPGP; 7	SPGP; 5	BAR; 5	BAR; 10	MOS; 14	MOS; 3	ROA; 17	ROA; 9	MOH; 1	MOH; 4	UTA; 6	UTA; 1	SONO; 2	SONO; 1	LAG; 10				1st	
2016	Cadillac Racing	Cadillac ATS-V.R	GT	AUS; 3	AUS; 2	SPGP; 4	SPGP; 3	LBGP; 15	BAR; 2	BAR; 1	MOS; 11	MOS; 7	LRP; 9	LRP; 14	ROA; 7	ROA; 3	MOH; 7	MOH; 1	UTA; 15	UTA; 6	SONO; 3	SONO; 21	LAG; 3	3rd	
2017	Cadillac Racing	Cadillac ATS-V.R	GT	SPGP; 7	SPGP; 5	LBGP; 14	VIR; 3	VIR; 3	MOS; 1	LRP; 4	LRP; 2	ROA; 3	ROA; 5	MOH; 2	MOH; 7	UTA; 8	UTA; 3	AUS; 4	AUS; 6	AUS; DNF	SONO; 1	SONO; 1		1st (SprintX), 2nd (Overall), 3rd (GT Sprint)	

=== Complete WeatherTech SportsCar Championship results ===
(key) (Races in bold indicate pole position; results in italics indicate fastest lap)

Year	Team	Class	Make	Engine	1	2	3	4	5	6	7	Pos.	Points
2022	Riley Motorsports	LMP3	Ligier JS P320	Nissan VK56DE 5.6 L V8	DAY; 1	SEB	MOH	WGL	MOS	ELK	PET	-*	0*
