= Myles Rowe =

American racing driver (born 2000)

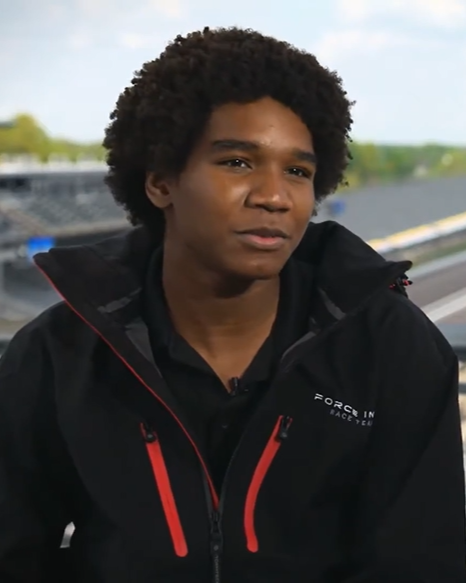
- Rowe in 2021
- Nationality: (United States) American (Jamaica) Jamaican via dual nationality
- Born: June 19, 2000 (age 26); Powder Springs, Georgia, U.S.

Indy NXT career
- Debut season: 2024
- Current team: Abel Motorsports with Force Indy
- Car number: 99
- Former teams: HMD Motorsports with Force Indy
- Starts: 36
- Championships: 0
- Wins: 3
- Podiums: 8
- Poles: 0
- Fastest laps: 0
- Best finish: 4th in 2025

Previous series
- 2024 2023 2021–22 2017–18: GT4 America Series; USF Pro 2000 Championship; USF2000 Championship; Lucas Oil Formula Car Race Series

Championship titles
- 2023: USF Pro 2000 Championship

Myles Rowe (born June 19, 2000) is an American racing driver of Jamaican descent who is currently competing in Indy NXT for Abel Motorsports with Force Indy. He is the 2023 USF Pro 2000 champion.

== Career ==
=== USF2000 Championship ===
==== 2021 ====
After not competing in motorsports for several years, newly formed team Force Indy announced that Rowe and the team would compete in the USF2000 Championship in 2021. Rowe would get his first win at the second race in New Jersey. He would make history by becoming the first African American to win in the series. Rowe would end up finishing 13th by the end of the season.

==== 2022 ====
After the 2021 season concluded, Force Indy announced that it would move up to the Indy Lights series in 2022. However, this resulted in Rowe being out of a ride for the 2022 season in the USF2000 Championship. Due to a lack of a budget for the full season, Rowe launched a GoFundMe campaign. He received a $200,000 donation which allowed him to sign with Pabst Racing to compete at the opening round in St. Petersburg. After crashing in the first race at St. Petersburg with Thomas Nepveu, Rowe would win the second race and his first with Pabst Racing. With additional sponsorship, he was able to compete at the second round at Barber and would win the first race. Rowe continued into the third round at Indianapolis searching for additional funds with his season likely to be cut short if additional funding could not be found. However, his season was saved due to additional funding from Roger Penske.

Rowe would continue to run the full season and contend for the 2022 championship. From the round at Indianapolis Raceway Park to the first race in Toronto, he would take three wins and seven straight podiums.

The championship battle would go into the final round at Portland between Jace Denmark and Michael d'Orlando. Rowe was leading the championship with 346 points with d'Orlando (323 points) and Denmark (321 points) sitting in second and third respectively. Rowe would qualify in fourth for race one but ultimately finished in tenth due to running wide trying to defend position from Nikita Johnson. This would reduce Rowe's lead in the championship to just four points ahead of Denmark.

In Race 2, Denmark started in pole position, however Rowe drove over the back of Denmark's car at turn one, causing him to fall down the order. He subsequently finished sixteenth, with fellow championship contender d'Orlando finishing in fourth.

Going into the final race, Rowe was still the championship leader with 363 points while Denmark (357 points) and d'Orlando (356 points) were in second and third respectively. Rowe would experience contact on lap one of the race demoting him to fifteenth. He managed to make up ten places to finish fifth. Ultimately, this was not enough to claim the title since rival d'Orlando managed to win the race and consequently the championship.

Rowe ended the 2022 USF2000 season with five wins, finishing second in the overall championship.

=== USF Pro 2000 Championship ===
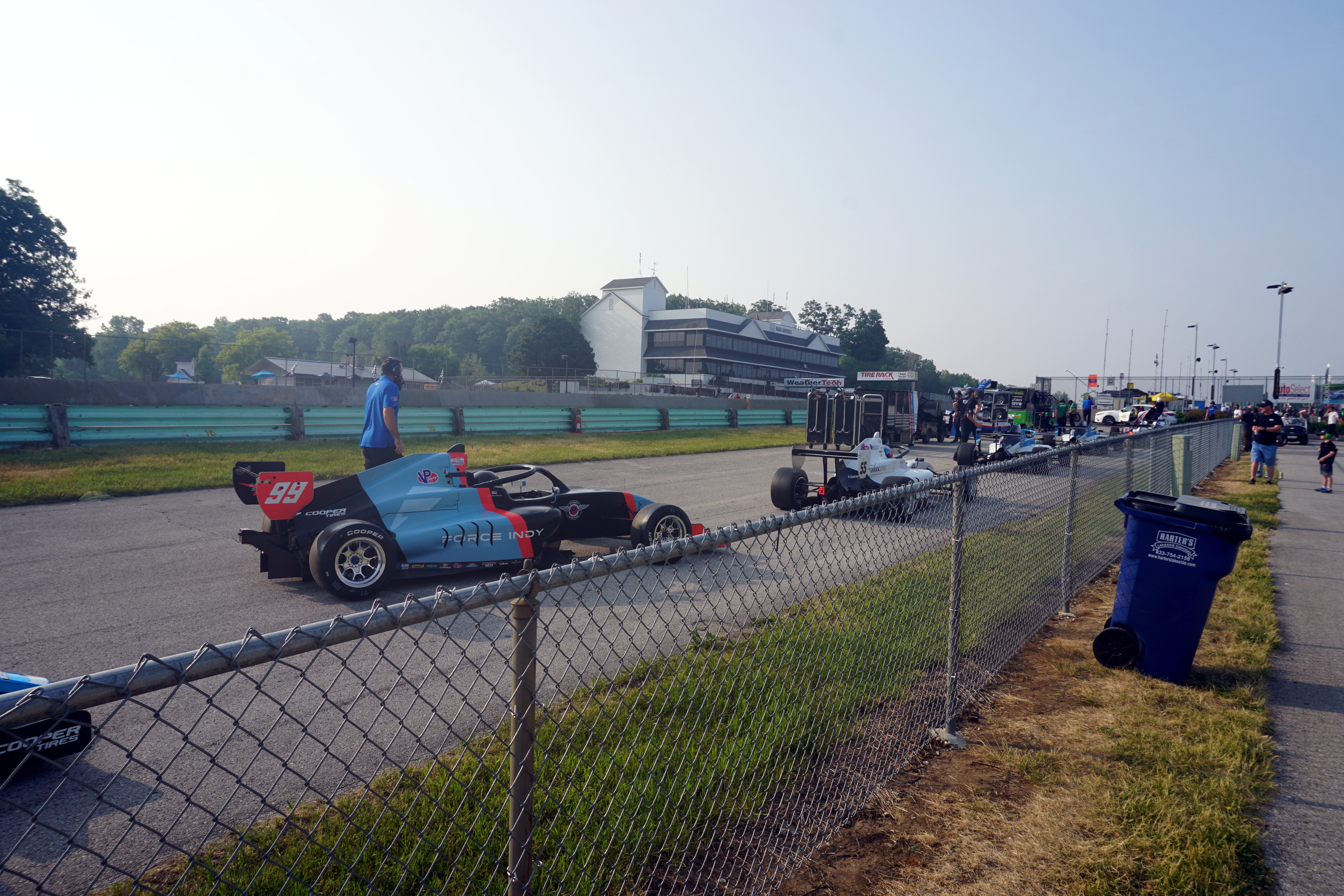
Myles Rowe before the 2023 USF Pro 2000 Championship race at Road America

For 2023, Rowe moved up to the USF Pro 2000 Championship under the Pabst Racing with Force Indy banner. He was dominant through the first quarter of the season. In the opening round at St. Petersburg, Rowe brought home two podiums, including a win in race 2. At Sebring in late March, he won both the third and fourth rounds, increasing his points total to more than 40 that of his closest competitor.

At Indianapolis, Rowe would not finish the first race at IMS but would recover to fifth place finish in the second race. He would collect a top-five in the Carb Night Classic at Indianapolis Raceway Park. At Road America, he would grab another podium in race 1 and get yet another top-five. At the sixth round at Mid-Ohio, he would finish outside of the top-ten for the first time in race 1, and in race 2, Rowe would bounce back with winning the race from pole position. Toronto would be a return to form for Rowe, leading the most laps in race 1 before unfortunately falling back to seventh, then in race 2, he would dominate to grab his fifth win of the season. In the he penultimate round at the Circuit of the Americas, Rowe would lose ground in the championship as title rival Kiko Porto would take home the win the race 1 on Saturday and second on Sunday, meanwhile Rowe grabbed fourth and sixth respectively.

At the championship finale triple-header in Portland, Rowe would come 2nd behind Porto in race 1. The next day in race 2, Rowe, starting alongside Porto would jump him into turn one and chased after Lirim Zendeli in third, and by the half-way stage of the race he would pass Zendeli for third. For the rest of the race, he would keep the cars behind and come across the line in third to become the 2023 USF Pro 2000 champion. In doing so, Rowe would also make history in becoming the first African-American driver to win an American open-wheel championship. He would also win the $640,000 scholarship to move up to Indy NXT in 2024.

=== Indy NXT ===
==== 2024 season ====
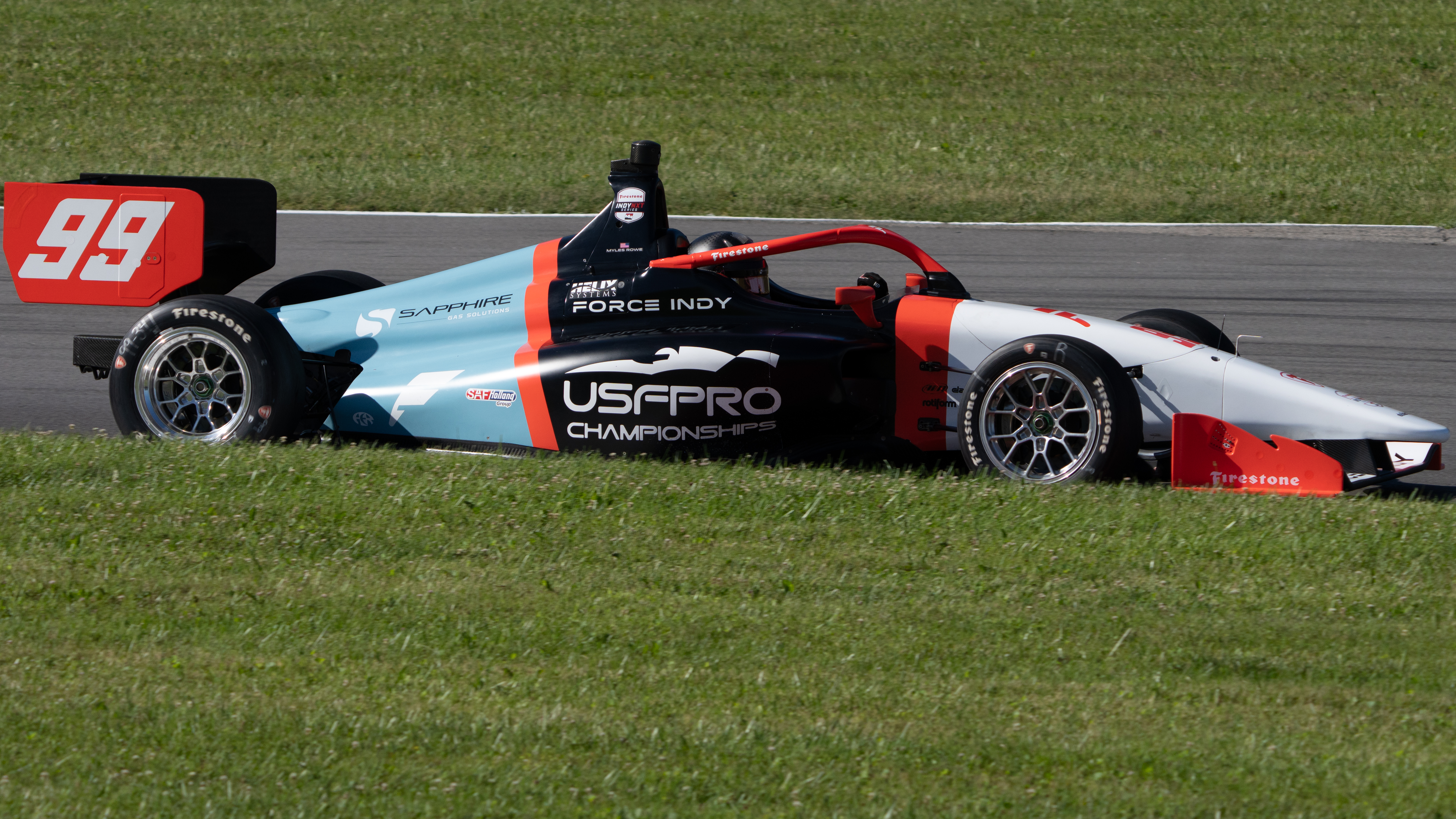
Rowe at Mid-Ohio in 2024

Shortly after the conclusion of the 2023 USF Pro 2000 season, it was announced that Rowe would be moving to the No. 99 Force Indy/HMD entry for the 2024 Indy NXT with HMD Motorsports.

==== 2025 season ====
Rowe switched to Abel Motorsports for the 2025 Indy NXT season. He would start his season strong in the opening two races of the season at St. Petersburg and Barber, finishing fourth in both races, which moved him up to third in the championship standings. For races three and four at Indianapolis, Rowe qualified in fifth. In race one at Indianapolis, Rowe moved up from his starting spot of fifth to third in the opening stages of the race. Following the second caution flag due to an incident between James Roe and Nikita Johnson, Rowe was being challenged by Salvador de Alba on the restart going into turn one. Rowe braked late into turn one and was successfully able to keep his position and stay in front of de Alba. Rowe would stay in third for the remainder of the race and went on to score his maiden podium in the series.

At Iowa Speedway, Rowe passed the dominant Dennis Hauger with fourteen laps to go and held on to earn his first career win in the Indy NXT series, becoming the first Black driver to do so.

==== 2026 season ====
Rowe remains with Abel Motorsports for the 2026 season. At the June Gateway Motorsports Park race, Rowe started 24th and last in the field, and charged to the lead on lap 47, taking the checkered flag and earning a victory that is considered historic for the Indy NXT series.

== Personal life ==
Rowe was born in Powder Springs, Georgia, although he currently resides in Brooklyn, New York.

Rowe initially pursued golf, but at the age of ten became interested in motorsport and Formula One after watching racing on television with his father.

== Karting record ==
=== Karting career summary ===
Season	Series	Team	Position
2015	SKUSA SuperNationals XIX — TaG Junior	Top Kart USA/Grand Products	52nd

== Racing record ==
=== Racing career summary ===
Season	Series	Team	Races	Wins	Poles	F/Laps	Podiums	Points	Position
2017	Lucas Oil Formula Car Race Series	N/A	6	3	2	2	3	190	13th
2018	Lucas Oil Formula Car Race Series	N/A	2	2	0	0	2	80	19th
2021	USF2000 Championship	Force Indy	18	1	0	0	1	137	13th
2022	USF2000 Championship	Pabst Racing	18	5	2	6	10	381	**2nd**
2023	USF Pro 2000 Championship	Pabst Racing with Force Indy	18	5	4	3	9	391	**1st**
2024	Indy NXT	HMD Motorsports with Force Indy	14	0	0	0	0	285	11th
2024	GT4 America Series - Pro-Am	Rotek Racing	2	0	0	0	0	0	NC†
2025	Indy NXT	Abel Motorsports with Force Indy	14	2	0	4	6	458	4th
2026	Indy NXT	Abel Motorsports with Force Indy	17	1	0	1	3	388	8th

† As Rowe was a guest driver, he was ineligible to score championship points.

* Season still in progress.

=== American open-wheel racing results ===
==== Complete Lucas Oil Formula Car Race Series results ====
(key) (Races in bold indicate pole position) (Races in italics indicate fastest lap)

Year	Team	1	2	3	4	5	6	7	8	9	10	11	12	13	14	15	16	Pos	Points
2018	N/A	PAL; 1	PAL; 2	ACC; 1; 1	ACC; 2; 1	NOL; 1	NOL; 2	TSM; 1	TSM; 2	NCM; 1	NCM; 2	ROA; 1	ROA; 2	MOH; 1	MOH; 2	SEB; 1	SEB; 2	19th	80

==== USF2000 Championship ====
(key) (Races in bold indicate pole position) (Races in italics indicate fastest lap) (Races with * indicate most race laps led)

Year	Team	1	2	3	4	5	6	7	8	9	10	11	12	13	14	15	16	17	18	Rank	Points
2021	Force Indy	ALA; 1; 24	ALA; 2; 6	STP; 1; 8	STP; 2; 23	IMS; 1; 21	IMS; 2; 10	IMS; 3; 23	LOR; 12	ROA; 1; 20	ROA; 2; 10	MOH; 1; 28	MOH; 2; 16	MOH; 3; 28	NJMP; 1; 13	NJMP; 2; 1	NJMP; 3; 16	MOH; 4; 5	MOH; 5; 21	13th	137
2022	Pabst Racing	STP; 1; 18	STP; 2; 1	**ALA**; **1**; 1*	ALA; 2; 4*	IMS; 1; 17	IMS; 2; 3	IMS; 3; 6	IRP; 3	ROA; 1; 2	ROA; 2; 2	**MOH**; **1**; 1*	MOH; 2; 1*	MOH; 3; 3	TOR; 1; 1*	TOR; 2; 5	POR; 1; 10	POR; 2; 16	POR; 3; 5	2nd	381

==== USF Pro 2000 Championship ====
(key) (Races in bold indicate pole position) (Races in italics indicate fastest lap) (Races with * indicate most race laps led)

Year	Team	1	2	3	4	5	6	7	8	9	10	11	12	13	14	15	16	17	18	Rank	Points
2023	Pabst Racing with Force Indy	STP; 1; 3	STP; 2; 1*	SEB; 1; 1*	SEB; 2; 1*	IMS; 1; 18	**IMS**; **2**; 5	IRP; 5	ROA; 1; 2	ROA; 2; 4	MOH; 1; 11	**MOH**; **2**; 1*	**TOR**; **1**; 7*	**TOR**; **2**; 1*	COTA; 1; 4	COTA; 1; 6	POR; 1; 2	POR; 2; 3	POR; 3; 10	1st	391

==== Indy NXT ====
(key) (Races in bold indicate pole position) (Races in italics indicate fastest lap) (Races with ^{L} indicate a race lap led) (Races with * indicate most race laps led)

Year	Team	1	2	3	4	5	6	7	8	9	10	11	12	13	14	15	16	17	Rank	Points
2024	HMD Motorsports with Force Indy	STP; 8	BAR; 6	IMS; 5	IMS; 7	DET; 4	RDA; 19	LAG; 6	LAG; 17	MOH; 19	IOW; 18	GMP; 17	POR; 7	MIL; 15	NSH; 14				11th	285
2025	Abel Motorsports with Force Indy	STP; 4	BAR; 4	IMS; 3	IMS; 3	DET; 18	GMP; 2	RDA; 5	MOH; 10	IOW; 1	LAG; 4	LAG; 8	POR; 3	MIL; 6	NSH; 1				4th	458
2026	Abel Motorsports with Force Indy	STP; 6	ARL; 9	BAR; 5	BAR; 23	IMS; 7	IMS; 24	DET; 2	GAT; 1*	ROA; 9	ROA; 5	MOH; 9	MOH; 16	NSS; 3	POR; 22	MIL; 21	LAG; 23	LAG; 6	8th	388

* Season still in progress.
