= 2023 USF Pro 2000 Championship =

Racing season

The 2023 USF Pro 2000 Championship was the 25th season in series history and the first under the USF Pro 2000 moniker. When the top rung of the Road to Indy ladder system, Indy Lights, was bought by Penske Entertainment (owners of IndyCar) in 2021 and the lower level series changed sanctioning to the United States Auto Club, changes were made to the other championships in the ladder that resulted in the championship being rebranded for 2023. This, together with the Indy Lights being rebranded to Indy NXT, effectively ended the "Road to Indy" branding, with the three championships below Indy NXT now collectively called "USF Pro Championships Presented by Cooper Tires".

The three Andersen Promotions series continued to have tire contracts with the Goodyear Tire and Rubber Company, while the NTT IndyCar Series and Indy NXT had tire contracts with Bridgestone Corporation to use Firestone tires.

Myles Rowe won the championship after an outstanding season where he collected 5 wins and 9 podiums, making history as he became the first African-American to win a U.S. open-wheel championship. His team, Pabst Racing, won their first championship at this level of competition.

== Series news ==
- As part of the rebrand and new alignment of the ladder system, the scholarship for the champion was increased to $664,425.

== Drivers and teams ==
All drivers competed using Tatuus IP-22 racecars with Elite Mazda 2.0-014A engines and Cooper tires.

Team	No.	Driver(s)	Round(s)
DEForce Racing	7	(United States) Bijoy Garg	1–13, 16–18
DEForce Racing	7	(Canada) Mac Clark	14–15
DEForce Racing	8	(Mexico) Jorge Garciarce	14–15
DEForce Racing	12	(Brazil) Kiko Porto	All
Exclusive Autosport	90	(United States) Yuven Sundaramoorthy	1–13
Exclusive Autosport	91	(Mexico) Salvador de Alba	All
Exclusive Autosport	92	(Sweden) Joel Granfors	1–13
Exclusive Autosport	93	(United States) Lindsay Brewer	All
Exclusive Autosport	95	(United States) Avery Towns	14–18
FatBoy Racing!	83	(United States) Charles Finelli	5–6, 8–9
Jay Howard Driver Development	4	(Mexico) Ricardo Escotto	All
Jay Howard Driver Development	6	(United States) Reece Ushijima	1–11
Jay Howard Driver Development	6	(United States) Frankie Mossman	14–18
Miller Vinatieri Motorsports	40	(United States) Jack William Miller	All
NeoTech Motorsport	81	(Brazil) Nicholas Monteiro	1–15
Pabst Racing with Force Indy	99	(United States) Myles Rowe	All
Pabst Racing	19	(United States) Jordan Missig	All
Pabst Racing	20	(United States) Jace Denmark	All
TJ Speed Motorsports	10	(Albania) Lirim Zendeli	1–6, 8–18
TJ Speed Motorsports	32	(United States) Christian Weir	1–13
TJ Speed Motorsports	32	(Brazil) Nicholas Monteiro	16–18
TJ Speed Motorsports	55	(Italy) Francesco Pizzi	All
Turn 3 Motorsport	1	(United States) Michael d'Orlando	All
Turn 3 Motorsport	2	(Republic of Ireland) Jonathan Browne	All
Turn 3 Motorsport	3	(United States) Christian Brooks	1–2
Turn 3 Motorsport	3	(Canada) Louka St-Jean	8–18
Turn 3 Motorsport	44	(United States) Christian Brooks	12–13
Turn 3 Motorsport	44	(United States) Danny Dyszelski	16–18
Turn 3 Motorsport	47	(United States) Jackson Lee	1–11
Velocity Racing Development	17	(United States) Nikita Johnson	14–18

== Schedule ==
The 2023 schedule was revealed on October 17, 2022. It featured two street circuits, six road courses and one oval round. The championship returned to Sebring for the first time since 2010 (when it was called Star Mazda Championship) and to Austin for the first time since 2013 (when it was called Pro Mazda Championship). All rounds except the weekends at Sebring, Indianapolis Raceway Park and Circuit of the Americas supported IndyCar.

Rd.	Date	Race name	Track	Location
1	March 4–5	Discount Tire Grand Prix of St. Petersburg	R Streets of St. Petersburg	St. Petersburg, Florida
2	March 4–5	Andersen Interior Contracting Grand Prix of St. Petersburg	R Streets of St. Petersburg	St. Petersburg, Florida
3	March 25–26	Cooper Tires Grand Prix of Sebring	R Sebring International Raceway	Sebring, Florida
4	March 25–26	Cooper Tires Grand Prix of Sebring	R Sebring International Raceway	Sebring, Florida
5	May 12–13	USF Pro 2000 Discount Tire Grand Prix of Indianapolis	R Indianapolis Motor Speedway Road Course	Speedway, Indiana
6	May 12–13	USF Pro 2000 Discount Tire Grand Prix of Indianapolis	R Indianapolis Motor Speedway Road Course	Speedway, Indiana
7	May 27	USF Pro 2000 Cooper Tires Freedom 90	O Lucas Oil Indianapolis Raceway Park	Brownsburg, Indiana
8	June 17–18	L&W Supply Grand Prix of Road America	R Road America	Elkhart Lake, Wisconsin
9	June 17–18	L&W Supply Grand Prix of Road America	R Road America	Elkhart Lake, Wisconsin
10	July 1–2	Cooper Tires Grand Prix of Mid-Ohio	R Mid-Ohio Sports Car Course	Lexington, Ohio
11	July 1–2	Cooper Tires Grand Prix of Mid-Ohio	R Mid-Ohio Sports Car Course	Lexington, Ohio
12	July 15–16	Cooper Tires Grand Prix of Toronto	R Exhibition Place	Toronto, Ontario, Canada
13	July 15–16	Cooper Tires Grand Prix of Toronto	R Exhibition Place	Toronto, Ontario, Canada
14	August 26–27	Discount Tire Circuit of The Americas Grand Prix	R Circuit of the Americas	Austin, Texas
15	August 26–27	Discount Tire Circuit of The Americas Grand Prix	R Circuit of the Americas	Austin, Texas
16	September 2–3	VP Racing Fuels Grand Prix of Portland	R Portland International Raceway	Portland, Oregon
17	September 2–3	VP Racing Fuels Grand Prix of Portland	R Portland International Raceway	Portland, Oregon
18	September 2–3	VP Racing Fuels Grand Prix of Portland	R Portland International Raceway	Portland, Oregon

== Race results ==
Rd.	Track	Pole position	Fastest lap	Most laps led	Race winner	
Rd.	Track	Pole position	Fastest lap	Most laps led	Driver	Team
1	(United States) Streets of St. Petersburg	(United States) Christian Brooks	(Italy) Francesco Pizzi	(United States) Christian Brooks	(United States) Christian Brooks	Turn 3 Motorsport
2	(United States) Streets of St. Petersburg	(Italy) Francesco Pizzi	(Sweden) Joel Granfors	(United States) Myles Rowe	(United States) Myles Rowe	Pabst Racing with Force Indy
3	(United States) Sebring International Raceway	(United States) Jace Denmark	(United States) Jace Denmark	(United States) Myles Rowe	(United States) Myles Rowe	Pabst Racing with Force Indy
4	(United States) Sebring International Raceway	(United States) Michael d'Orlando	(United States) Myles Rowe	(United States) Myles Rowe	(United States) Myles Rowe	Pabst Racing with Force Indy
5	(United States) Indianapolis Motor Speedway Road Course	(Brazil) Kiko Porto	(United States) Myles Rowe	(Brazil) Kiko Porto	(Mexico) Ricardo Escotto	Jay Howard Driver Development
6	(United States) Indianapolis Motor Speedway Road Course	(United States) Myles Rowe	(United States) Myles Rowe	(Sweden) Joel Granfors	(Sweden) Joel Granfors	Exclusive Autosport
7	(United States) Lucas Oil Indianapolis Raceway Park	(United States) Jack William Miller	(Mexico) Salvador de Alba	(Mexico) Salvador de Alba	(Mexico) Salvador de Alba	Exclusive Autosport
8	(United States) Road America	(United States) Michael d'Orlando	(United States) Michael d'Orlando	multiple drivers	(United States) Michael d'Orlando	Turn 3 Motorsport
9	(United States) Road America	(United States) Christian Weir	(Italy) Francesco Pizzi	(Albania) Lirim Zendeli	(Albania) Lirim Zendeli	TJ Speed Motorsports
10	(United States) Mid-Ohio Sports Car Course	(United States) Michael d'Orlando	(Mexico) Salvador de Alba	(United States) Michael d'Orlando	(United States) Michael d'Orlando	Turn 3 Motorsport
11	(United States) Mid-Ohio Sports Car Course	(United States) Myles Rowe	(Brazil) Kiko Porto	(United States) Myles Rowe	(United States) Myles Rowe	Pabst Racing with Force Indy
12	(Canada) Exhibition Place	(United States) Myles Rowe	(Mexico) Ricardo Escotto	(United States) Myles Rowe	(United States) Michael d'Orlando	Turn 3 Motorsport
13	(Canada) Exhibition Place	(United States) Myles Rowe	(United States) Jordan Missig	(United States) Myles Rowe	(United States) Myles Rowe	Pabst Racing with Force Indy
14	(United States) Circuit of the Americas	(Canada) Mac Clark	(Canada) Mac Clark	(Brazil) Kiko Porto	(Brazil) Kiko Porto	DEForce Racing
15	(United States) Circuit of the Americas	(Brazil) Kiko Porto	(Canada) Mac Clark	(United States) Nikita Johnson	(United States) Nikita Johnson	Velocity Racing Development
16	(United States) Portland International Raceway	(United States) Michael d'Orlando	(Albania) Lirim Zendeli	(Brazil) Kiko Porto	(Brazil) Kiko Porto	DEForce Racing
17	(United States) Portland International Raceway	(United States) Michael d'Orlando	(United States) Nikita Johnson	(United States) Michael d'Orlando	(United States) Michael d'Orlando	Turn 3 Motorsport
18	(United States) Portland International Raceway	(United States) Michael d'Orlando	(United States) Nikita Johnson	(United States) Nikita Johnson	(United States) Nikita Johnson	Velocity Racing Development

== Season report ==
=== First half ===
The first season under the USF Pro 2000 guise began around the streets of St. Petersburg with Turn 3's Christian Brooks on pole position. After not getting the chance to contest last year's race due to a crash in qualifying, he made the most of this opportunity and controlled the race to take a flag-to-flag win. Behind him, DEForce's Kiko Porto and Pabst's Myles Rowe were hot on his tail but could not make a move. The latter of the two started the second race in fifth and quickly worked his way up the order. He took the race lead from Porto, who had overtaken TJ Speed's pole sitter Francesco Pizzi earlier, around the half point and built a gap from there onwards. Porto took another second place by keeping Pabst's Jace Denmark behind him. Rowe left St. Petersburg as the championship leader, three points ahead of Porto, with Brooks a further three points behind.

Next up was the series' return to Sebring, where Denmark and Turn 3's Michael d'Orlando shared pole positions. Porto and d'Orlando were both unable to start the first race, while Rowe immediately went for the lead down the inside of Denmark. This top two remained until the penultimate lap, where Exclusive's Joel Granfors and Pizzi both got by Denmark onto the podium. Rowe started third in race two, but overtook both leaders into the same corner. He then made a mistake on the second safety car restart of the race, allowing TJ Speed's Lirim Zendeli to attack him from second, but did not concede the lead. A race-long fight for third was won by Porto in the end, who minimized his points disadvantage that way. Rowe's third win in a row catapulted him 42 points in the lead, ahead of Porto and Pizzi, who were equal on points.

Porto was on pole position for the first race at Indianapolis Motor Speedway. A chaotic race saw Porto fend off multiple other drivers, until a rain shower arrived and caused a stoppage. JHDD's Ricardo Escotto was by far the fastest car in the final part, rising up from tenth to the lead. Porto was less fortunate and dropped back at the same time, conceding the podium places to his teammate Reece Ushijima and d'Orlando. Rowe began the second race in first, but spun right away. Granfors used cautions and chaos to his advantage to rise from eighteenth on the grid into contention. He took the lead from Exclusive's Salvador de Alba on lap eleven, while Denmark consolidated third place. Rowe had a first race to forget as he retired and was classified 18th, but managed to salvage eighth place in race two. Still, his lead over Porto was reduced to 39 points.

The season's only oval race was the Freedom 90 at Indianapolis Raceway Park. Miller Vinatieri's Jack William Miller took pole position. Granfors ran into the back of Miller on the start, before De Alba and Pizzi both moved forward: De Alba took the lead, while Pizzi jumped into third. The Mexican controlled the race from the front, unbothered by his competitors behind and lapped traffic in front. Pizzi and Miller behind him were locked into a battle that eventually opened the door for Granfors to swoop into third. He was then also able to demote Miller to third, but was equally unable to disturb De Alba's lead. The race then ended under yellow when TJ Speed's Christian Weir hit the wall. Granfors' second place earned him second in the standings, while championship leader Rowe came fifth, his points lead now at 32 points.

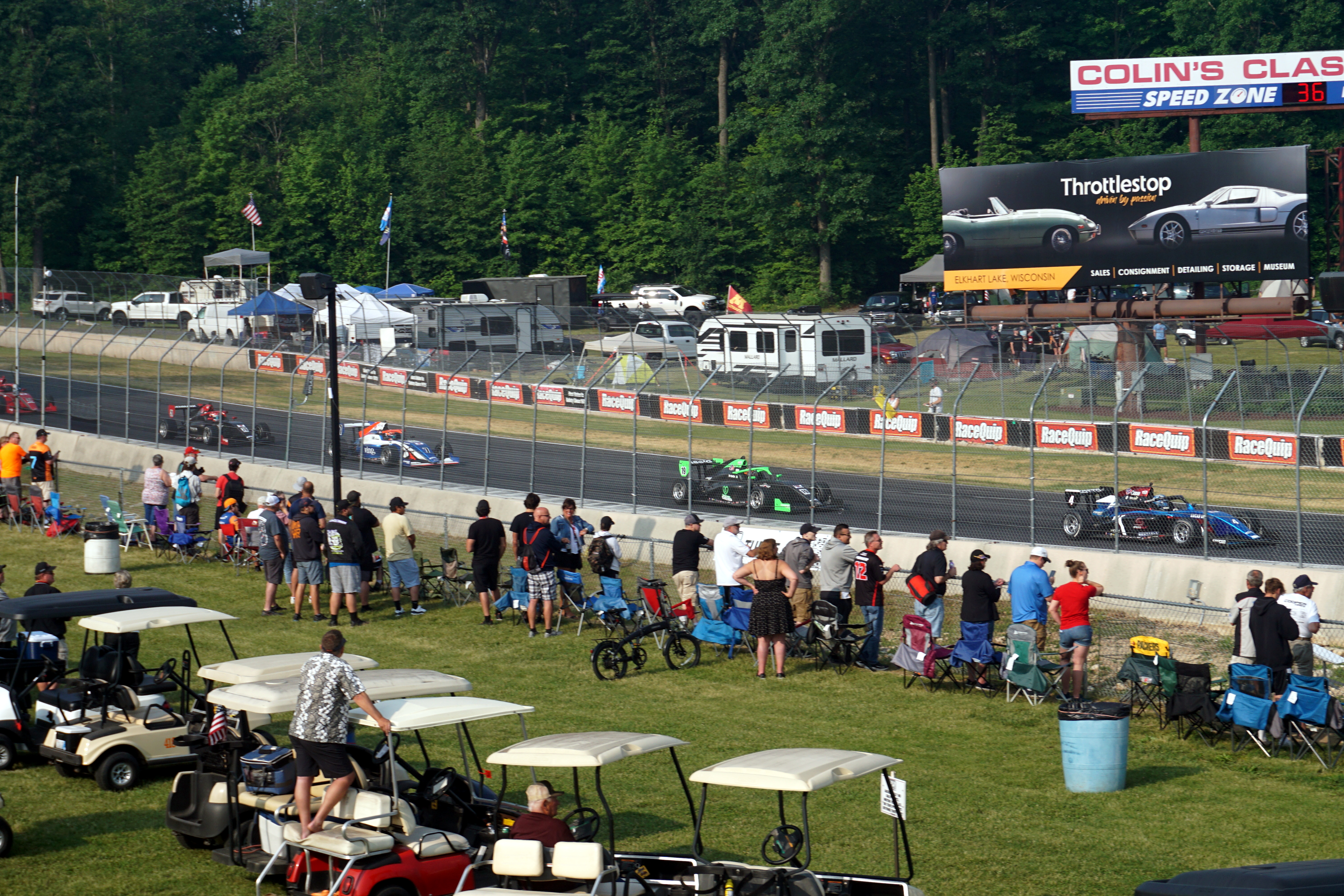
2023 USF Pro 2000 Championship race at Road America

The first half of the season came to a close with d'Orlando and Weir taking pole positions at Road America. D'Orlando held his lead in race one until he went off on lap four, allowing Rowe into the lead. Ushijima shortly claimed the lead on a restart before dropping back to fourth. D'Orlando battled back into the lead and won, ahead of Rowe and Pabst's Jordan Missig. The second race began with Weir and d'Orlando colliding on the warm-up lap, leaving Zendeli in front. He was attacked by Turn 3's Jonathan Browne and Pizzi, with the latter getting past for a short time. Zendeli got back in front and held on to win, while Porto took advantage of Browne and Pizzi battling to take second and lead the Irishman home. Rowe finished fourth, while his closest competitor Granfors had to concede second in the standings to Pizzi, now 48 points behind the leader.

=== Second half ===
D'Orlando and Rowe took pole positions in a close qualifying session at Mid-Ohio. Porto ran wide at the start of race one and rejoined unsafely, causing multiple retirements. Rain then started to fall, necessitating a stoppage, and the field was released with two laps to go. D'Orlando had led the whole race and was unaffected by the weather conditions. He won the race ahead of Denmark and Miller, who had avoided the earlier chaos. Rowe on his part was pressured by d'Orlando during the first part of race two. When a safety car was then called, Porto overtook d'Orlando on the restart to eventually form a trio of the pair and de Alba that took turns attacking Rowe. The latter prevailed, leading home Porto and d'Orlando. Rowe's fourth win extended his championship lead, while Pizzi had a horrible weekend, relinquishing second place back to Granfors, 56 points behind Rowe.

The season's only event abroad at Exhibition Place began with Rowe taking double pole positions and then crashing in qualifying. He held his lead at the start of race one, while de Alba and d'Orlando traded second behind him. A caution period was then turned into a red flag when rain hit the track. Rowe was the first to hit the wet track at racing speeds and ran deep into turn three. This allowed d'Orlando and de Alba through to take first and second, while Zendeli passed four cars to take third. A big crash at the start of race two did not disturb Rowe, neither did the attack of Denmark, who lost his front wing in the process. He collected his fifth win, while d'Orlando in second struggled and dropped behind Zendeli and Missig. Granfors was involved in the crash at the start and so dropped down the standings. Now Porto was in second place, albeit 81 points behind Rowe.

The penultimate round marked the series' return to Circuit of the Americas, and DEForce's debutant Mac Clark took pole position. The experienced Porto started race one behind him and soon took the lead. Clark tried coming back at a later restart, but was unable to do so, so settled for second place. Completing the podium was another debutant, VRD's Nikita Johnson. The American, only 15 years of age, did even better in the second race: he started third behind Porto and Clark and overtook the latter during the first lap. He then spent six laps working on Porto in the lead before he finally got past him. Johnson took the win on only his second start in the series as both debutants took double podiums. Porto's win and second place coupled with a quiet fourth and sixth place for Rowe kept the championship mathematically alive - Rowe was now 58 points in the lead.

D'Orlando took pole position for the season finale at Portland. Seven cars crashed out on the first lap as d'Orlando and Porto avoided the chaos. The former was then dropped back by a penalty, resulting in a podium consisting of Porto, Rowe and DEForce's Bijoy Garg. This kept the title fight alive for the penultimate race, which saw d'Orlando win from pole, ahead of Johnson. Rowe came third to become the first USF Pro 2000 champion, as well as the first African-American U.S. open-wheel champion. The season ended with another win for youngster Johnson. He passed poleman d'Orlando right at the start and then survived five safety car restarts in a race of high attrition. De Alba came second to secure his third place in the standings, while Browne rounded out the podium. At the end of the season, Rowe's points advantage stood at 64 points.

After Rowe ended his 2022 season by getting beat to the USF2000 title. Dominating the Sebring weekend gave him a comfortable cushion to aim for consistent, reliable finishes instead of having to take risks. While Porto managed to delay Rowe's win to the penultimate race, he never looked able to consistently keep up with Rowe enough to become a serious rival. The championship's next year also looks to be a strong one, with drivers like Clark and Johnson debuting late in 2023 and already earning wins and podiums.

== Championship standings ==
=== Drivers' Championship ===
Scoring system

Position	**1st**	**2nd**	**3rd**	**4th**	**5th**	**6th**	**7th**	**8th**	**9th**	**10th**	**11th**	**12th**	**13th**	**14th**	**15th**	**16th**	**17th**	**18th**	**19th**	**20th**
Points	30	25	22	19	17	15	14	13	12	11	10	9	8	7	6	5	4	3	2	1
Points (O)	45	38	33	29	26	23	21	20	18	17	15	14	12	11	9	8	6	5	3	2

- The driver who qualified on pole was awarded one additional point.
- One point was awarded to the driver who led the most laps in a race.
- One point was awarded to the driver who set the fastest lap during the race.

Pos	Driver	STP		SEB		IMS		IRP	ROA		MOH		TOR		COA		POR			Points
1	(United States) Myles Rowe	3	1*	1*	1*	18	**5**	5	2	4	11	**1***	**7***	**1***	4	6	2	3	10	391
2	(Brazil) Kiko Porto	2	2	19	3	**7***	11	10	5	2	19	2	5	7	1*	**2**	1*	5	17	327
3	(Mexico) Salvador de Alba	7	17	7	16	6	2	1*	14	10	10	4	2	5	8	5	10	11	2	291
4	(United States) Michael d'Orlando	18	11	16	**11**	3	14	6	**1**	20	**1***	3	1	14	17	7	**7**	**1***	**5**	288
5	(Italy) Francesco Pizzi	4	**5**	3	7	10	7	4	6	5	15	17	6	6	16	9	6	10	6	259
6	(Albania) Lirim Zendeli	16	4	6	2	13	10		19	1*	6	10	3	2	5	4	11	4	18	258
7	(United States) Jace Denmark	5	3	**4**	17	16	3	18	7	7	2	5	9	16	18	8	4	6	4	252
8	(Republic of Ireland) Jonathan Browne	10	12	12	8	4	4	7	4	3	17	15	15	10	10	13	13	9	3	230
9	(United States) Jack William Miller	14	9	11	6	5	15	**3**	16	11	3	12	18	13	7	10	12	8	14	212
10	(Sweden) Joel Granfors	9	8	2	9	20	1*	2	15	6	4	9	4	19						206
11	(United States) Jordan Missig	20	7	5	19	19	8	8	3	17	20	18	10	3	19	12	8	13	7	179
12	(United States) Bijoy Garg	12	14	14	12	17	13	14	18	19	5	8	17	9			3	7	13	154
13	(Mexico) Ricardo Escotto	15	18	18	10	1	17	15	11	9	9	11	13	15	6	18	16	19	16	153
14	(United States) Reece Ushijima	6	19	8	4	2	9	11	13	8	18	6								140
15	(United States) Yuven Sundaramoorthy	8	20	9	14	15	12	9	10	13	13	13	14	8						121
16	(United States) Christian Weir	17	10	10	13	8	6	17	9	**15**	8	14	12	17						119
17	(United States) Nikita Johnson														3	1*	14	2	1*	118
18	(United States) Lindsay Brewer	13	16	15	18	11	19	16	12	14	16	19	16	12	14	19	18	15	11	108
19	(Brazil) Nicholas Monteiro	19	13	17	15	14	16	13	20	12	12	16	11	11	15	16	19	18	19	106
20	(Canada) Louka St-Jean								8	16	7	7	19	18	13	15	5	14	8	101
21	(United States) Jackson Lee	11	15	13	5	9	18	12	17	18	14	20								84
22	(United States) Christian Brooks	**1***	6										8	4						79
23	(Canada) Mac Clark														**2**	3				50
24	(United States) Avery Towns														12	17	9	16	12	39
25	(United States) Frankie Mossman														9	11	17	17	15	37
26	(United States) Danny Dyszelski																15	12	9	27
27	(Mexico) Jorge Garciarce														11	14				17
28	(United States) Charles Finelli					12	20		21	21										12
Pos	Driver	STP		SEB		IMS		IRP	ROA		MOH		TOR		COA		POR			Points

Color	Result
Gold	Winner
Silver	2nd place
Bronze	3rd place
Green	4th & 5th place
Light Blue	6th–10th place
Dark Blue	Finished (Outside Top 10)
Purple	Did not finish
Red	Did not qualify (DNQ)
Brown	Withdrawn (Wth)
Black	Disqualified (DSQ)
White	Did not start (DNS)
Blank	Did not participate

**In-line notation**
**Bold**	Pole position (1 point)
Italics	Ran fastest race lap (1 point)
*	Led most race laps (1 point); Not awarded if more than one driver led most laps
Rookie

=== Teams' championship ===
Scoring system

Position	**1st**	**2nd**	**3rd**	**4th**	**5th**	**6th**	**7th**	**8th**	**9th**	**10th+**
Points	22	18	15	12	10	8	6	4	2	1

- Single car teams received 3 bonus points as an equivalency to multi-car teams
- Only the best two results counted for teams fielding more than two entries

Pos	Team	STP		SEB		IMS		IRP	ROA		MOH		TOR		COA		POR			Points
1	Pabst Racing (Note: The entry lists listed Pabst Racing by Force Indy as a one-car team separate from the main Pabst Racing team, while the official points listed all three cars together.)	3	1	1	1	13	3	5	2	4	2	1	7	1	4	6	2	3	4	403
1	Pabst Racing	5	3	4	14	15	5	8	3	7	11	5	9	3	15	8	4	6	7	403
2	Turn 3 Motorsport	1	6	9	5	3	4	6	1	3	1	3	1	4	10	7	5	1	3	318
2	Turn 3 Motorsport	9	9	10	8	4	11	7	5	13	7	7	8	9	12	12	8	9	5	318
3	DEForce Racing	2	2	11	3	7	9	9	6	2	5	2	5	7	1	2	1	5	9	282
3	DEForce Racing	10	11	14	11	14	10	12	12	14	14	8	12	8	2	3	3	7	13	282
4	TJ Speed Motorsports	4	4	3	2	8	6	4	7	1	6	10	3	2	5	4	7	4	6	282
4	TJ Speed Motorsports	13	5	5	7	10	7	14	8	5	8	13	6	6	14	9	10	10	14	282
5	Exclusive Autosport	7	7	2	9	6	1	1	9	6	4	4	2	5	8	5	6	11	2	263
5	Exclusive Autosport	8	12	6	12	9	2	2	11	10	10	9	4	10	11	14	9	12	8	263
6	Miller Vinatieri Motorsports	11	8	8	6	5	12	3	13	11	3	12	13	12	7	10	11	8	10	130
7	Jay Howard Driver Development	6	13	7	4	1	8	10	4	8	9	6	10	13	6	11	13	13	11	125
7	Jay Howard Driver Development	12	14	13	10	2	14	13	10	9	13	11			9	15	14	14	12	125
8	Velocity Racing Development														3	1	12	2	1	93
9	NeoTech Motorsport	14	10	12	13	12	13	11	14	12	12	14	11	11	13	13				60
10	FatBoy Racing!					11	15		15	15										16
Pos	Team	STP		SEB		IMS		IRP	ROA		MOH		TOR		COA		POR			Points

== See also ==
- 2023 IndyCar Series
- 2023 Indy NXT
- 2023 USF2000 Championship
- 2023 USF Juniors
