= Michael d'Orlando =

American racing driver (born 2002)

- Nationality: (United States) American
- Born: March 6, 2002 (age 24); Hartsdale, New York, U.S.
- Relatives: Nicholas d'Orlando (brother)

Indy NXT career
- Debut season: 2024
- Current team: Andretti Cape Indy NXT
- Car number: 3
- Starts: 6
- Championships: 0
- Wins: 0
- Podiums: 0
- Poles: 0
- Fastest laps: 0
- Best finish: TBD in 2024

Previous series
- 2023 2018–22 2019 2017: USF Pro 2000 Championship; USF2000 Championship; F4 United States Championship; F2000 Championship Series

Championship titles
- 2022: USF2000 Championship

Michael d'Orlando (born March 6, 2002) is an American racing driver who last competed in the 2025 Indy NXT driving for Andretti Cape Indy NXT. He previously drove for Turn 3 Motorsport in the 2023 USF Pro 2000 Championship. He is the 2022 USF2000 champion.

== Career ==
=== Formula 4 United States Championship ===
On July 26, 2019, it was announced that d'Orlando would compete in the Formula 4 United States Championship with Velocity Racing Development starting at the third round at Virginia International Raceway. He would end up with a third place finish at the final race at Circuit of the Americas.

=== USF2000 Championship ===
After a brief stint in the U.S. F2000 National Championship in 2018 with Team Benik, d'Orlando announced on March 3, 2020, that he would return to the series for the full 2020 season and drive for Cape Motorsports. He won his first race at Mid-Ohio and finished fourth in the standings.

On February 17, 2021, d'Orlando confirmed that he would return to the championship with Cape Motorsports for the 2021 season. He won three races that season and finished second in the championship.

d'Orlando would return to the series for a fourth year in 2022 once again with Cape Motorsports. He would compete for the championship all season with competitors Myles Rowe and Jace Denmark. The title would be decided at the final round at Portland. d'Orlando would win the final race of the season which allowed him to win the 2022 championship.

== Personal life ==
D'Orlando has a younger brother named Nicholas who is also a racing driver.

== Racing record ==
=== Career summary ===
Season	Series	Team	Races	Wins	Poles	F/Laps	Podiums	Points	Position
2017	F2000 Championship Series	Team Pelfrey	2	0	0	0	2	76	20th
2018	U.S. F2000 National Championship	Team Benik	9	0	0	0	0	56	20th
2019	Formula 4 United States Championship	Velocity Racing Development	11	0	0	0	1	40	14th
2020	U.S. F2000 National Championship	Cape Motorsports	17	1	0	0	5	295	4th
2021	U.S. F2000 National Championship	Cape Motorsports	18	3	5	2	8	365	**2nd**
2022	U.S. F2000 National Championship	Cape Motorsports	18	4	5	4	8	387	**1st**
2023	USF Pro 2000 Championship	Turn 3 Motorsport	18	4	6	1	6	288	4th
2024	Indy NXT	Andretti Cape Indy NXT	7	0	0	0	0	171	18th
2025	Indy NXT	Andretti Cape Indy NXT	3	0	0	0	0	66	22nd

* Season still in progress.

=== Complete Formula 4 United States Championship results ===
(key) (Races in bold indicate pole position) (Races in italics indicate fastest lap) (Races with * indicate most race laps led)

Year	Team	1	2	3	4	5	6	7	8	9	10	11	12	13	14	15	16	17	Rank	Points
2019	Velocity Racing Development	ATL; 1	ATL; 2	ATL; 3	PIT; 1	PIT; 2	PIT; 3	VIR; 1; 10	VIR; 2; 14	VIR; 3; 5	MOH; 1; 7	MOH; 2; 14	MOH; 3; 6	SEB; 1; 23	SEB; 2 Ret	SEB; 3 Ret	COA; 1; 30†	COA; 2; 3	14th	40

=== American open-wheel racing results ===
==== USF2000 Championship ====
(key) (Races in bold indicate pole position) (Races in italics indicate fastest lap) (Races with * indicate most race laps led)

Year	Team	1	2	3	4	5	6	7	8	9	10	11	12	13	14	15	16	17	18	Rank	Points
2018	Team Benik	STP; 1; 16	STP; 2; 23	IMS; 1; 25	IMS; 2; 15	LOR	ROA; 1; 22	ROA; 2; 6	TOR; 1	TOR; 2	MOH; 1; 8	MOH; 2; 20	MOH; 3; 8	POR; 1	POR; 2					20th	56
2020	Cape Motorsports	ROA; 1; 5	ROA; 2; 2	MOH; 1; 4	MOH; 2; 10	MOH; 3; 2	LOR; 4	IMS; 1; 20	IMS; 2; 6	IMS; 3; 19	MOH; 1; 1*	MOH; 2; 7	MOH; 3; 2	NJMP; 1; 3	NJMP; 2; 4	NJMP; 3; 17	STP; 1; 5	STP; 2; 4		4th	295
2021	Cape Motorsports	ALA; 1; 4	ALA; 2; 9	STP; 1; 20	STP; 2; 3	IMS; 1; 2	IMS; 2; 4	IMS; 3; 4	**LOR**; 1*	ROA; 1; 2	ROA; 2; 22	MOH; 1; 1	MOH; 2; 2	MOH; 3; 1*	NJMP; 1; 5	**NJMP**; **2**; 18	**NJMP**; **3**; 4	**MOH**; **4**; 2	**MOH**; **5**; 4	2nd	365
2022	Cape Motorsports	STP; 1; 4	STP; 2; 4	ALA; 1; 3	ALA; 2; 2	IMS; 1; 21	IMS; 2; 5*	IMS; 3; 2	**IRP**; 1*	**ROA**; **1**; 14*	**ROA**; **2**; 1*	MOH; 1; 14	**MOH**; **2**; 2	**MOH**; **3**; 1*	TOR; 1; 4	TOR; 2; 4	POR; 1; 7	POR; 2; 4	POR; 3; 1*	1st	387

==== USF Pro 2000 Championship ====
(key) (Races in bold indicate pole position) (Races in italics indicate fastest lap) (Races with * indicate most race laps led)

Year	Team	1	2	3	4	5	6	7	8	9	10	11	12	13	14	15	16	17	18	Rank	Points
2023	Turn 3 Motorsport	STP; 1; 18	STP; 2; 11	SEB; 1; 16	**SEB**; **2**; 11	IMS; 1; 3	IMS; 2; 14	IRP; 6	**ROA**; **1**; 1	ROA; 2; 20	**MOH**; **1**; 1*	MOH; 2; 3	TOR; 1; 1	TOR; 2; 14	COTA; 1; 17	COTA; 1; 7	**POR**; **1**; 9	**POR**; **2**; 1*	**POR**; **3**; 5	4th	288

* Season still in progress.

==== Indy NXT ====
(key) (Races in bold indicate pole position) (Races in italics indicate fastest lap) (Races with ^{L} indicate a race lap led) (Races with * indicate most race laps led)

Year	Team	1	2	3	4	5	6	7	8	9	10	11	12	13	14	Rank	Points
2024	Andretti Cape Indy NXT	STP; 4	BAR; 7	IMS; 12	IMS; 6	DET; 10	RDA; 11	LAG	LAG	MOH	IOW	GMP	POR	MIL	NSH; 6	18th	171
2025	Andretti Cape Indy NXT	STP	BAR	IMS	IMS	DET	GMP	RDA	MOH	IOW	LAG	LAG	POR; 7	MIL; 8	NSH; 14	22nd	66

* Season still in progress.
