= Jace Denmark =

American racing driver

- Nationality: (United States) American
- Born: Jace Denmark-Gessel; July 1, 2004 (age 22) Phoenix, Arizona, United States

USF Pro 2000 Championship career
- Debut season: 2023
- Current team: TJ Speed Motorsports
- Car number: 26
- Former teams: Pabst Racing
- Starts: 36
- Wins: 0
- Podiums: 12
- Poles: 2
- Fastest laps: 2
- Best finish: 3rd in 2024

Previous series
- 2021–2022 2021 2020: USF2000 Championship; F1600 Championship Series; Formula 4 United States Championship

Jace Denmark-Gessel (born July 1, 2004) is an American racing driver. He competes in the 2025 USF Pro 2000 Championship driving for TJ Speed Motorsports. Denmark previously competed in the 2024 USF Pro 2000 Championship for Pabst Racing.

== Career ==
=== USF2000 Championship ===
==== 2021 ====
On April 1, 2021, Pabst Racing announced that it had signed Denmark to drive in the U.S. F2000 National Championship. He got his first podium at Lucas Oil Indianapolis Raceway Park. Denmark finished eleventh in the championship.

==== 2022 ====
Denmark would return to the USF2000 series for the 2022 season again driving for Pabst Racing. He got his maiden win at the first race of the season at St. Petersberg after a crash with Myles Rowe and Thomas Nepveu promoted Denmark to the lead. In the second race, Denmark reached the podium again, finishing second.

Denmark continued to have multiple wins throughout the season at Road America and Toronto, before heading into the three-race season finale in Portland.

==== Season finale ====
At the beginning of the Portland race weekend, Denmark was sitting third in the championship with 321 points, just behind Michael d'Orlando (323 points) and Myles Rowe (346 points). After a successful qualifying, Denmark was in first for all three races and won Race 1 despite some contact in the opening lap. This put Denmark to within four points of Rowe (Rowe: 357, Denmark: 353 , d'Orlando: 337).

In Race 2, Denmark started in pole position, however his teammate and championship leader Rowe drove over the back of Denmark's car at turn one, causing Denmark to retire. Rowe subsequently finished sixteenth, with fellow championship contender d'Orlando finishing fourth.

Denmark (357 points) was once again on pole for Race 3 and was just six points behind championship leader Rowe (363 points), with d'Orlando just one point behind (356 points). Denmark led the way heading into turn one, but another driver, this time Thomas Nepveu made contact with Denmark's rear spinning Denmark around. This knocked Denmark out of the points. Rowe also experience contact in the opening lap, and despite making up ten places, finished the race in fifth. d'Orlando won the race, and thus won the championship.

Alongside the third place championship trophy, Denmark also received the championship's Spirit Award for the USF2000 2022 season.

=== USF Pro 2000 Championship ===
In 2023, Denmark signed with Pabst Racing for the USF Pro 2000 Championship. In the first four races, Denmark has had three top-five finishes, with one podium.

== Racing record ==
=== Career summary ===
Season	Series	Team	Races	Wins	Poles	F/Laps	Podiums	Points	Position
2020	Formula 4 United States Championship	DC Autosport	3	0	0	0	0	6	23rd
2021	F1600 Championship Series	K-Hill Motorsports	3	0	0	0	2	100	27th
2021	U.S. F2000 National Championship	Pabst Racing	18	0	0	0	1	210	11th
2022	U.S. F2000 National Championship	Pabst Racing	18	4	6	1	9	363	**3rd**
2023	USF Pro 2000 Championship	Pabst Racing	18	0	1	1	3	252	7th
2024	USF Pro 2000 Championship	Pabst Racing	18	0	1	1	9	345	**3rd**
2025	USF Pro 2000 Championship	TJ Speed Motorsports	9	0	0	0	0	118	16th
2026	Trans-Am Series - TA2								

* Season still in progress.

=== American open-wheel racing results ===
==== U.S. F2000 National Championship ====
(key) (Races in bold indicate pole position) (Races in italics indicate fastest lap) (Races with * indicate most race laps led)

Year	Team	1	2	3	4	5	6	7	8	9	10	11	12	13	14	15	16	17	18	Rank	Points
2021	Pabst Racing	ALA; 1; 8	ALA; 2; 12	STP; 1; 15	STP; 2; 11	IMS; 1; 10	IMS; 2; 20	IMS; 3; 15	LOR; 3	ROA; 1; 6	ROA; 2; 7	MOH; 1; 7	MOH; 2; 9	MOH; 3; 7	NJMP; 1; 7	NJMP; 2; 5	NJMP; 3; 7	MOH; 4; 20	MOH; 5; 15	11th	210
2022	Pabst Racing	STP; 1; 1	**STP**; **2**; 2*	ALA; 1; 11	ALA; 2; 18	IMS; 1; 14	IMS; 2; 4	IMS; 3; 4	IRP; 4	ROA; 1; 1	ROA; 2; 5	MOH; 1; 2	MOH; 2; 3	MOH; 3; 2	**TOR**; **1**; 2	**TOR**; **2**; 1*	**POR**; **1**; 1*	**POR**; **2**; 18	**POR**; **3**; 16	3rd	363

==== USF Pro 2000 Championship ====
(key) (Races in bold indicate pole position) (Races in italics indicate fastest lap) (Races with * indicate most race laps led)

Year	Team	1	2	3	4	5	6	7	8	9	10	11	12	13	14	15	16	17	18	Rank	Points
2023	Pabst Racing	STP; 1; 5	STP; 2; 3	**SEB**; **1**; 4	SEB; 2; 17	IMS; 1; 16	IMS; 2; 3	IRP; 18	ROA; 1; 7	ROA; 2; 7	MOH; 1; 2	MOH; 2; 5	TOR; 1; 9	TOR; 2; 16	COTA; 1; 18	COTA; 2; 8	POR; 1; 4	POR; 2; 6	POR; 3; 4	7th	252
2024	Pabst Racing	STP; 1; 20	STP; 2; 7	**LOU**; **1**; 3	LOU; 2; 7	LOU; 3; 2	IMS; 1; 12	IMS; 2; 3	IMS; 3; 6	IRP; 2	ROA; 1; 4	ROA; 2; 4	ROA; 3; 3	MOH; 1; 2	MOH; 2; 2	TOR; 1; 2	TOR; 2; 3	POR; 1; 14	POR; 2; 4	3rd	345
2025	TJ Speed Motorsports	STP; 1; 8	STP; 2; 6	LOU; 1; 9	LOU; 2; 7	LOU; 3; 7	IMS; 1; 7	IMS; 2; 4	IMS; 3; 15	IRP; 11	ROA; 1	ROA; 2	ROA; 3	MOH; 1	MOH; 2	TOR; 1	TOR; 2	POR; 1	POR; 2	16th	118
