= 2022 USF2000 Championship =

Car racing competition

The 2022 USF2000 Championship was the thirteenth season of the USF2000 Championship since its revival in 2010. The championship serves as the first rung of the IndyCar Series's Road to Indy ladder system. An 18 race schedule was announced on October 5, 2021 featuring five permanent road courses, two street circuits, and a single oval in the Lucas Oil Indianapolis Raceway Park.

Michael d'Orlando won the championship after surpassing both Myles Rowe and Jace Denmark in championship points during the final race of the season.

== Drivers and teams ==
Team	No.	Drivers	Rounds
Cape Motorsports	2	(United States) Jackson Lee	1–13
Cape Motorsports	3	(United States) Jagger Jones	All
Cape Motorsports	4	(United States) Michael d'Orlando	All
Cape Motorsports	5	(United States) Nicky Hays	All
DEForce Racing	10	(Canada) Thomas Nepveu	All
DEForce Racing	11	(United States) Dylan Christie	All
DEForce Racing	12	(United States) Bijoy Garg	1–15
DEForce Racing	12	(Canada) Mac Clark	16–18
DEForce Racing	13	(United States) Chase Gardner	5–7
Exclusive Autosport	90	(New Zealand) Jacob Douglas	All
Exclusive Autosport	91	(United States) Joey Brienza	6, 10, 18
Exclusive Autosport	91	(United States) Nicholas d'Orlando	14–15
Exclusive Autosport	92	(New Zealand) Billy Frazer	All
Exclusive Autosport	93	(United States) Nicholas d'Orlando	16–18
Jay Howard Driver Development	6	(Nicaragua) Frederik Lund	1–2
Jay Howard Driver Development	6	(United States) Frankie Mossman	5–7
Jay Howard Driver Development	6	(United States) Evagoras Papasavvas	9–18
Jay Howard Driver Development	7	(United States) Yeoroo Lee	1–7
Jay Howard Driver Development	7	(Australia) Lochie Hughes	11–13
Jay Howard Driver Development	7	(Nicaragua) Frederik Lund	14–15
Jay Howard Driver Development	8	(United States) Danny Dyszelski	3–13, 16–18
Jay Howard Driver Development	9	(Mexico) Jorge Garciarce	All
Joe Dooling Autosports	63	(United States) Trey Burke	1–10
Legacy Autosport	19	(United States) Simon Sikes	1–8
Pabst Racing	22	(United States) Myles Rowe	All
Pabst Racing	23	(United States) Jace Denmark	All
Turn 3 Motorsport	32	(United States) Christian Weir	All
Turn 3 Motorsport	34	(Canada) Lucas Mann	16–18
Turn 3 Motorsport with Ignite Autosport	33	(United States) Spike Kohlbecker	All
Velocity Racing Development	16	(United States) Ethan Ho	16–18
Velocity Racing Development	17	(United Kingdom) Alex Quinn	5–7
Velocity Racing Development	17	(United States) Nikita Johnson	9–13, 16–18
Velocity Racing Development	30	(Sweden) Viktor Andersson	1–7, 9–13
Velocity Racing Development	61	(United States) Nicholas d'Orlando	9–13

== Schedule ==
Round	Date	Race name	Circuit	Location
1	February 26–27	Cooper Tires Grand Prix of St. Petersburg	R Streets of St. Petersburg	St. Petersburg, Florida
2	February 26–27	Cooper Tires Grand Prix of St. Petersburg	R Streets of St. Petersburg	St. Petersburg, Florida
3	April 30 – May 1	Cooper Tires Grand Prix of Alabama	R Barber Motorsports Park	Birmingham, Alabama
4	April 30 – May 1	Cooper Tires Grand Prix of Alabama	R Barber Motorsports Park	Birmingham, Alabama
5	May 13–14	Cooper Tires Grand Prix of Indianapolis	R Indianapolis Motor Speedway Road Course	Speedway, Indiana
6	May 13–14	Cooper Tires Grand Prix of Indianapolis	R Indianapolis Motor Speedway Road Course	Speedway, Indiana
7	May 13–14	Cooper Tires Grand Prix of Indianapolis	R Indianapolis Motor Speedway Road Course	Speedway, Indiana
8	May 27	Cooper Tires Freedom 75	O Lucas Oil Indianapolis Raceway Park	Brownsburg, Indiana
9	June 11–12	Cooper Tires Grand Prix of Road America Powered by Elite Engines	R Road America	Elkhart Lake, Wisconsin
10	June 11–12	Cooper Tires Grand Prix of Road America Powered by Elite Engines	R Road America	Elkhart Lake, Wisconsin
11	July 2–3	Cooper Tires Grand Prix of Mid-Ohio	R Mid-Ohio Sports Car Course	Lexington, Ohio
12	July 2–3	Cooper Tires Grand Prix of Mid-Ohio	R Mid-Ohio Sports Car Course	Lexington, Ohio
13	July 2–3	Cooper Tires Grand Prix of Mid-Ohio	R Mid-Ohio Sports Car Course	Lexington, Ohio
14	July 16–17	Cooper Tires Grand Prix of Toronto	R Exhibition Place	Toronto, Ontario, Canada
15	July 16–17	Cooper Tires Grand Prix of Toronto	R Exhibition Place	Toronto, Ontario, Canada
16	September 2–4	Grand Prix of Portland	R Portland International Raceway	Portland, Oregon
17	September 2–4	Grand Prix of Portland	R Portland International Raceway	Portland, Oregon
18	September 2–4	Grand Prix of Portland	R Portland International Raceway	Portland, Oregon

== Race results ==
Round		Circuit	Pole position	Fastest lap	Most laps led	Race Winner	
Round		Circuit	Pole position	Fastest lap	Most laps led	Driver	Team
1	R1	(United States) Streets of St. Petersburg	(Canada) Thomas Nepveu	(United States) Myles Rowe	(Canada) Thomas Nepveu	(United States) Jace Denmark	Pabst Racing
2	R2	(United States) Streets of St. Petersburg	(United States) Jace Denmark	(United States) Myles Rowe	(United States) Jace Denmark	(United States) Myles Rowe	Pabst Racing
3	R1	(United States) Barber Motorsports Park	(United States) Myles Rowe	(United States) Michael d'Orlando	(United States) Myles Rowe	(United States) Myles Rowe	Pabst Racing
4	R2	(United States) Barber Motorsports Park	(United States) Christian Weir	(New Zealand) Billy Frazer	(United States) Jagger Jones	(United States) Jagger Jones	Cape Motorsports
5	R1	(United States) Indianapolis Motor Speedway Road Course	(United States) Jagger Jones	(United Kingdom) Alex Quinn	(United States) Jagger Jones	(United Kingdom) Alex Quinn	Velocity Racing Development
6	R2	(United States) Indianapolis Motor Speedway Road Course	(United States) Jagger Jones	(United States) Jace Denmark	(United States) Michael d'Orlando	(United Kingdom) Alex Quinn	Velocity Racing Development
7	R3	(United States) Indianapolis Motor Speedway Road Course	(United States) Jagger Jones	(United Kingdom) Alex Quinn	(United Kingdom) Alex Quinn	(United Kingdom) Alex Quinn	Velocity Racing Development
8		(United States) Lucas Oil Indianapolis Raceway Park	(United States) Michael d'Orlando	(United States) Bijoy Garg	(United States) Michael d'Orlando	(United States) Michael d'Orlando	Cape Motorsports
9	R1	(United States) Road America	(United States) Michael d'Orlando	(United States) Nicholas d'Orlando	(New Zealand) Billy Frazer	(United States) Jace Denmark	Pabst Racing
10	R2	(United States) Road America	(United States) Michael d'Orlando	(United States) Myles Rowe	(United States) Michael d'Orlando	(United States) Michael d'Orlando	Cape Motorsports
11	R1	(United States) Mid-Ohio Sports Car Course	(United States) Myles Rowe	(United States) Michael d'Orlando	(United States) Myles Rowe	(United States) Myles Rowe	Pabst Racing
12	R2	(United States) Mid-Ohio Sports Car Course	(United States) Michael d'Orlando	(United States) Christian Weir	(United States) Myles Rowe	(United States) Myles Rowe	Pabst Racing
13	R3	(United States) Mid-Ohio Sports Car Course	(United States) Michael d'Orlando	(United States) Michael d'Orlando	(United States) Michael d'Orlando	(United States) Michael d'Orlando	Cape Motorsports
14	R1	(Canada) Exhibition Place	(United States) Jace Denmark	(United States) Myles Rowe	(United States) Myles Rowe	(United States) Myles Rowe	Pabst Racing
15	R2	(Canada) Exhibition Place	(United States) Jace Denmark	(United States) Michael d'Orlando	(United States) Jace Denmark	(United States) Jace Denmark	Pabst Racing
16	R1	(United States) Portland International Raceway	(United States) Jace Denmark	(United States) Nikita Johnson	(United States) Jace Denmark	(United States) Jace Denmark	Pabst Racing
17	R2	(United States) Portland International Raceway	(United States) Jace Denmark	(United States) Myles Rowe	(Canada) Mac Clark	(Canada) Mac Clark	DEForce Racing
18	R3	(United States) Portland International Raceway	(United States) Jace Denmark	(United States) Myles Rowe	(United States) Michael d'Orlando	(United States) Michael d'Orlando	Cape Motorsports

== Championship standings ==
=== Drivers' Championship ===
Scoring system

Position	**1st**	**2nd**	**3rd**	**4th**	**5th**	**6th**	**7th**	**8th**	**9th**	**10th**	**11th**	**12th**	**13th**	**14th**	**15th**	**16th**	**17th**	**18th**	**19th**	**20th+**
Points	30	25	22	19	17	15	14	13	12	11	10	9	8	7	6	5	4	3	2	1
Points (O)	45	38	33	29	26	23	21	20	18	17	15	14	12	11	9	8	6	5	3	2

- The driver who qualifies on pole is awarded one additional point.
- One point is awarded to the driver who leads the most laps in a race.
- One point is awarded to the driver who sets the fastest lap during the race.

Pos	Driver	STP		ALA		IMS			IRP	ROA		MOH			TOR		POR			Points
1	(United States) Michael d'Orlando	4	4	3	2	21	5*	2	**1***	**14**	**1***	14	**2**	**1***	4	4	7	4	1*	387
2	(United States) Myles Rowe	18	1	**1***	4	17	3	6	3	2	2	**1***	1*	3	1*	5	10	16	5	381
3	(United States) Jace Denmark	1	**2***	11	18	14	4	4	4	1	5	2	3	2	**2**	**1***	**1***	**18**	**16**	363
4	(United States) Jagger Jones	8	3	9	1*	**2***	**18**	**3**	5	13	7	4	6	7	3	6	17	15	4	294
5	(New Zealand) Billy Frazer	2	6	2	17	3	2	7	7	3*	12	3	19	14	13	15	14	3	11	268
6	(Canada) Thomas Nepveu	**17***	5	6	6	5	16	5	6	5	3	13	12	6	11	2	3	9	14	262
7	(United States) Nicky Hays	15	8	8	7	13	8	11	17	11	9	7	5	11	6	10	8	2	2	235
8	(United States) Christian Weir	10	14	7	**3**	4	22	12	11	7	11	6	16	10	8	9	11	5	3	229
9	(United States) Bijoy Garg	3	15	4	10	20	7	8	2	6	4	9	17	9	12	14				203
10	(United States) Spike Kohlbecker	6	12	10	11	6	6	10	9	9	10	18	9	17	7	16	13	8	7	200
11	(United States) Dylan Christie	9	13	15	8	18	14	21	10	4	6	8	20	5	10	3	18	7	15	188
12	(New Zealand) Jacob Douglas	11	16	12	16	15	13	13	16	8	17	5	7	13	5	7	5	6	20	179
13	(Mexico) Jorge Garciarce	19	10	14	12	7	15	19	15	15	16	17	14	19	14	8	9	10	6	142
14	(United States) Simon Sikes	5	9	5	5	9	9	9	8											119
15	(United States) Jackson Lee	12	7	17	9	16	11	15	12	16	14	12	10	18						109
16	(United States) Danny Dyszelski			19	19	12	20	22	14	12	20	10	11	16			6	12	8	99
17	(United Kingdom) Alex Quinn					1	1	1*												93
18	(United States) Nikita Johnson									19	8	16	4	8			2	17	18	85
19	(Sweden) Viktor Andersson	13	19	13	13	11	17	16		18	15	11	13	12						81
20	(United States) Nicholas d'Orlando									10	13	15	8	20	9	12	19	19	9	77
21	(United States) Trey Burke	7	18	16	14	10	21	20	13	17	19									60
22	(Canada) Mac Clark																4	1*	19	52
23	(United States) Evagoras Papasavvas									20	DNS	19	15	15	16	11	16	14	12	51
24	(United States) Yeoroo Lee	16	11	18	15	DNS	23	17												29
25	(United States) Ethan Ho																12	11	13	27
26	(Nicaragua) Frederik Lund	14	17												15	13				25
27	(United States) Joey Brienza					DNS	12	DNS		DNS	18						DNS	DNS	10	23
28	(New Zealand) Lochie Hughes											DSQ	18	4						22
29	(United States) Frankie Mossman					8	19	14												22
30	(Canada) Lucas Mann																15	13	17	18
31	(United States) Chase Gardner					19	10	18												16
Pos	Driver	STP		ALA		IMS			IRP	ROA		MOH			TOR		POR			Points

Color	Result
Gold	Winner
Silver	2nd place
Bronze	3rd place
Green	4th & 5th place
Light Blue	6th–10th place
Dark Blue	Finished (Outside Top 10)
Purple	Did not finish
Red	Did not qualify (DNQ)
Brown	Withdrawn (Wth)
Black	Disqualified (DSQ)
White	Did not start (DNS)
Blank	Did not participate

**In-line notation**
**Bold**	Pole position (1 point)
Italics	Ran fastest race lap (1 point)
*	Led most race laps (1 point); Not awarded if more than one driver leads most laps
Rookie

== See also ==
- 2022 IndyCar Series
- 2022 Indy Lights
- 2022 Indy Pro 2000 Championship
- 2022 USF Juniors
