= Billy Frazer =

New Zealand racing driver

- Nationality: New Zealand
- Born: 30 December 2002 (age 23) Auckland, New Zealand

U.S. F2000 National Championship career
- Debut season: 2021
- Current team: Exclusive Autosport
- Car number: 92
- Starts: 33
- Wins: 0
- Podiums: 6
- Poles: 0
- Fastest laps: 2
- Best finish: 12th in 2021

Previous series
- 2021: Toyota Racing Series

Billy Frazer (born 30 December 2002) is a New Zealand racing driver. He last competed in the U.S. F2000 National Championship with Exclusive Autosport.

== Racing career ==
=== Toyota Racing Series ===
After winning the New Zealand Formula Ford title in 2020, it was announced on 13 December 2020, that he would move to the Toyota Racing Series in 2021 with M2 Competition. Frazer ended up finishing third in 2021.

=== U.S. F2000 National Championship ===
On the 11 February 2021, it was announced that Frazer would compete in the U.S. F2000 National Championship with Exclusive Autosport alongside his Toyota Racing Series campaign that same year.

After his rookie season in 2021, Frazer would compete in the championship in 2022 again with Exclusive Autosport.

== Racing record ==
=== Racing career summary ===
Season	Series	Team	Races	Wins	Poles	F/Laps	Podiums	Points	Position
2016–17	New Zealand Formula First Championship	N/A	18	0	0	0	0	469	14th
2017–18	New Zealand Formula First Championship	N/A	24	1	0	3	3	1030	5th
2018–19	New Zealand Formula First Championship	N/A	24	1	0	3	12	1347	**3rd**
2019–20	New Zealand Formula Ford Championship	N/A	15	8	2	4	10	926	**1st**
2021	Toyota Racing Series	M2 Competition	9	1	0	0	3	201	**3rd**
2021	U.S. F2000 National Championship	Exclusive Autosport	18	0	0	1	0	192	12th
2021	F1600 Championship Series	Exclusive Autosport	3	0	0	0	1	72	31st
2022	U.S. F2000 National Championship	Exclusive Autosport	18	0	0	1	7	268	5th
2023	Formula Regional Oceania Championship	Hamilton Motorsport	6	0	0	0	0	33	19th

* Season still in progress.

=== American open-wheel racing results ===
==== U.S. F2000 National Championship ====
(key) (Races in bold indicate pole position) (Races in italics indicate fastest lap) (Races with * indicate most race laps led)

Year	Team	1	2	3	4	5	6	7	8	9	10	11	12	13	14	15	16	17	18	Rank	Points
2021	Exclusive Autosport	ALA; 1; 6	ALA; 2; 13	STP; 1; 4	STP; 2; 12	IMS; 1; 12	IMS; 2; 16	IMS; 3; 12	LOR; 13	ROA; 1; 25	ROA; 2; 13	MOH; 1; 4	MOH; 2; 7	MOH; 3; 15	NJMP; 1; 9	NJMP; 2; 12	NJMP; 3; 10	MOH; 4; 8	MOH; 5; 9	12th	192
2022	Exclusive Autosport	STP; 1; 2	STP; 2; 6	ALA; 1; 2	ALA; 2; 17	IMS; 1; 3	IMS; 2; 2	IMS; 3; 7	IRP; 7	ROA; 1; 3*	ROA; 2; 12	MOH; 1; 3	MOH; 2; 19	MOH; 3; 14	TOR; 1; 13	TOR; 2; 15	POR; 1; 14	POR; 2; 3	POR; 3; 11	5th	268

* Season still in progress.

=== Complete Formula Regional Oceania Championship results ===
(key) (Races in bold indicate pole position) (Races in italics indicate fastest lap)

Year	Team	1	2	3	4	5	6	7	8	9	10	11	12	13	14	15	DC	Points
2023	Giles Motorsport	HIG; 1	HIG; 2	HIG; 3	TER; 1	TER; 2	TER; 3	MAN; 1; 14	MAN; 2; 11	MAN; 3; 15	HMP; 1; 14	HMP; 2 Ret	HMP; 3; 15	TAU; 1	TAU; 2	TAU; 3	19th	33
