= 2025 Indy NXT =

Indy NXT season

2025 Indy NXT season
- Firestone Indy NXT Series

Season
- Races: 14
- Start date: March 2
- End date: August 31

Awards
- Drivers' champion: (Norway) Dennis Hauger
- Teams' champion: (United States) Andretti Global
- Rookie of the Year: (Norway) Dennis Hauger

The 2025 Firestone Indy NXT Series was the 39th season of the Indy NXT open wheel auto racing series and the 23rd sanctioned by IndyCar, acting as the primary support series for the IndyCar Series. This was the third year of the championship running under the Indy NXT moniker following its acquisition by Penske Entertainment, the owner of the IndyCar Series, in 2022.

Andretti Global driver Dennis Hauger won the Drivers' Championship title with one race to spare, and in doing so also became Rookie of the Year.

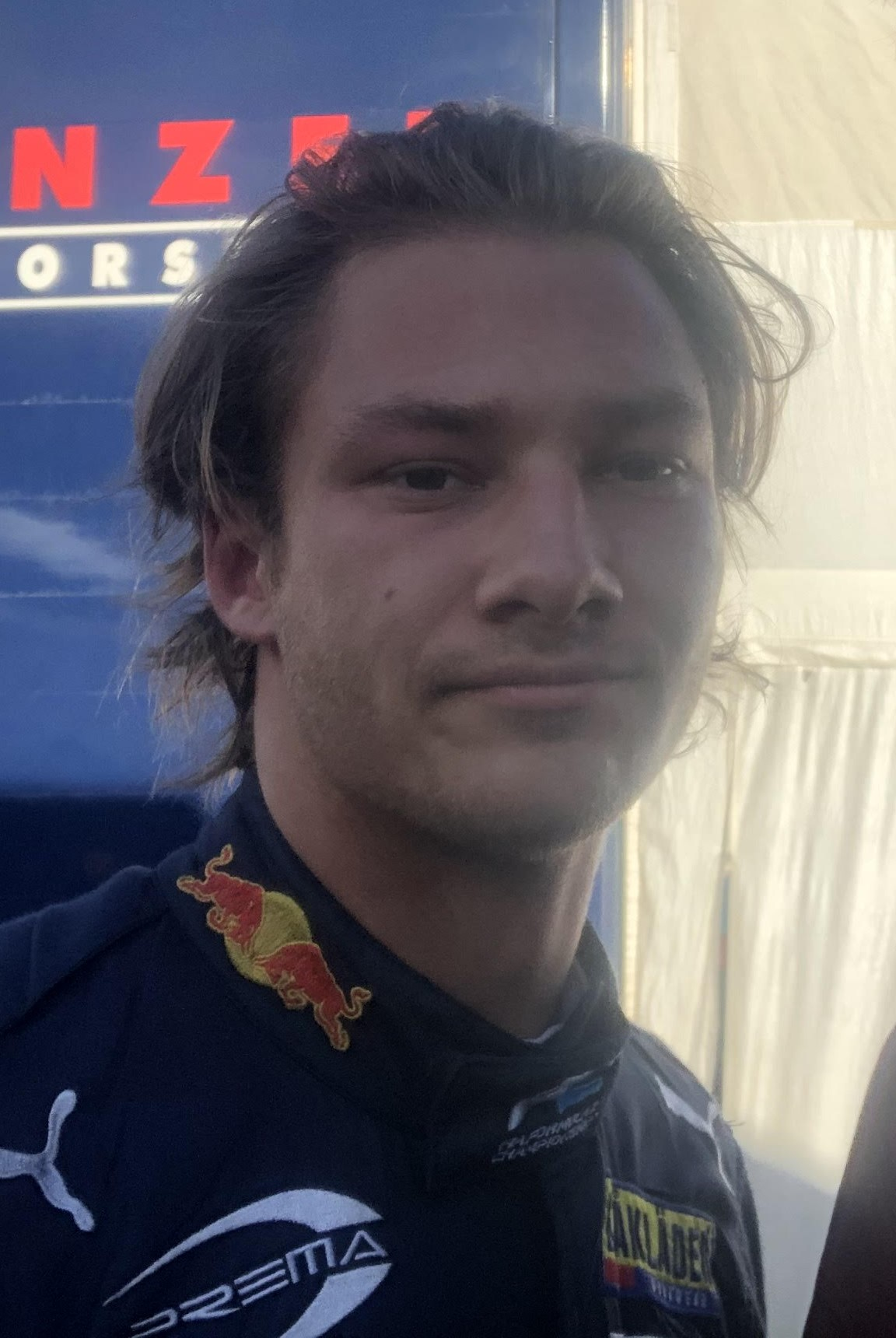
Dennis Hauger of Andretti Global won the championship in his rookie season of Indy NXT

== Teams and drivers ==
All teams used Dallara IL-15 cars with an AER produced Mazda sourced 2.0 litre engine and Firestone tires. The following drivers and teams competed in the series.

Team	No.	Drivers	Status	Round(s)
Abel Motorsports	17	(New Zealand) Callum Hedge		All
Abel Motorsports	48	(United States) Jordan Missig		All
Abel Motorsports with Miller Vinatieri Motorsports	40	(United States) Jack William Miller		All
Abel Motorsports with Force Indy	99	(United States) Myles Rowe		All
Andretti Global	26	(Australia) Lochie Hughes	R	All
Andretti Global	27	(Mexico) Salvador de Alba		All
Andretti Global	28	(Norway) Dennis Hauger	RY	All
Andretti Global	29	(Republic of Ireland) James Roe		All
Andretti Cape Indy NXT	2	(United Kingdom) Sebastian Murray	R	All
Andretti Cape Indy NXT	3	(Mexico) Ricardo Escotto		1–9
Andretti Cape Indy NXT	3	(United States) Michael d'Orlando		12–14
Chip Ganassi Racing	9	(Republic of Ireland) Jonathan Browne		1
Chip Ganassi Racing	9	(United States) Bryce Aron		2–14
Chip Ganassi Racing	10	(Netherlands) Niels Koolen		All
HMD Motorsports	11	(United States) Nolan Allaer		1–12, 14
HMD Motorsports	14	(United States) Josh Pierson		All
HMD Motorsports	16	(Australia) Tommy Smith	R	All
HMD Motorsports	18	(United States) Nikita Johnson	R	1, 3–4
HMD Motorsports	18	(United States) Max Taylor	R	2, 5, 9–11, 13
HMD Motorsports	24	(Germany) Sophia Flörsch	R	1
HMD Motorsports	24	(United States) Evagoras Papasavvas	R	2–4, 7–8
HMD Motorsports	24	(United States) Davey Hamilton Jr.		6, 9, 13–14
HMD Motorsports	24	(Brazil) Nicholas Monteiro	R	12
HMD Motorsports	30	(New Zealand) Liam Sceats	R	1–5, 7, 10–11
HMD Motorsports	38	(United States) Hailie Deegan	R	All
HMD Motorsports	39	(United States) Bryce Aron		1
HMD Motorsports	39	(United States) Juan Manuel Correa	R	3–6, 8–12
HMD Motorsports	76	(Brazil) Caio Collet		All

Icon	Status
R	Eligible for Rookie of the Year
RY	Rookie of the Year

=== Team changes ===
- On September 4, 2024, IndyCar team Chip Ganassi Racing announced its return to the Indy NXT series with a two-car effort. CGR last competed in Indy NXT's predecessor Indy Lights in 2008.
- On February 4, 2025, Abel Motorsports announced a partnership with Miller Vinatieri Motorsports to field the No. 40 as their fourth entry, with Jack William Miller as the driver.
- On February 13, 2025, Juncos Hollinger Racing announced it had elected to temporarily step back from competing in Indy NXT to focus on their IndyCar efforts, thereby relinquishing their 2025 entry despite having already signed Miguel María García to drive one of their cars.

=== Driver changes ===
- On January 16, 2024, Andretti and Cape Motorsports announced Salvador de Alba would be driving the No. 2 car of the newly formed Andretti Cape partnership in 2024. This announcement also included that de Alba's 2025 Indy NXT program would see him move over to Andretti Global.
- On September 26, 2024, it was announced that Myles Rowe and the Force Indy program supporting him would switch to Abel Motorsports for the 2025 season to field the No. 99 Abel Motorsports with Force Indy car.
- On October 8, 2024, Andretti Global announced that 2024 USF Pro 2000 champion Lochie Hughes would graduate to Indy NXT with the team.
- On October 10, 2024, HMD Motorsport disclosed that Tommy Smith, who spent the previous two years in FIA Formula 3, would pilot the No. 16 car in 2025.
- On October 14, 2024, HMD Motorsport announced two further drivers for its 2025 campaign: Bryce Aron, who would depart Andretti Global, with whom he came ninth in his debut season in 2024, and former NASCAR Xfinity Series driver Hailie Deegan, who would make her series debut.
- On October 18, 2024, Andretti Global announced that Formula 2 driver Dennis Hauger would pilot the No. 28 car, thereby completing the team's lineup.
- On October 24, 2024, Andretti Global announced Ricardo Escotto would pilot the No. 3 car run under the Andretti Cape Indy NXT guise in technical partnership with Cape Motorsports, thereby entering his first full Indy NXT season after contesting five races in 2024 with Juncos Hollinger Racing.
- On October 30, 2024, Chip Ganassi Racing announced the driver lineup for their return to Indy NXT. It consisted of two drivers departing HMD Motorsports in Jonathan Browne, who finished the 2024 season in 13th, and Niels Koolen, who finished his part-time 2024 campaign in 20th.
- On November 1, 2024, Juncos Hollinger Racing announced their first driver for 2025 in Miguel María García, who last competed in Super TC2000.
- On November 25, 2024, Abel Motorsports announced that Callum Hedge would join the team for his second Indy NXT season, departing HMD Motorsports after coming fourth in 2024.
- On December 4, 2024, Jamie Chadwick announced she would join IDEC Sport in the LMP2 class of the European Le Mans Series, thereby leaving the championship.
- On December 11, 2024, it was announced Yuven Sundaramoorthy, who was slated to drive for Abel Motorsports, had to withdraw due to “unforeseen budget challenges.”
- On December 14, 2024, Abel Motorsports announced that Jordan Missig, who contested five races with the team in 2024 as a replacement for Josh Mason, would race full-time for the team in 2025.
- On December 19, 2024, HMD Motorsports announced that FIA F3 and endurance racing driver Sophia Flörsch would join the team for the 2025 season, making her Indy NXT debut.
- On January 13, 2025, Dale Coyne Racing announced that Jacob Abel would join the team for a full-time IndyCar step-up in 2025.
- On January 21, 2025, Andretti Global announced that GB3 driver Sebastian Murray would make the jump up to Indy NXT to pilot the No. 2 Andretti Cape Indy NXT car.
- On January 29, 2025, HMD Motorsports announced that reigning USF Juniors champion Max Taylor would drive the team's No. 18 car for a part-time campaign comprising the rounds at Barber Motorsports Park, Detroit Street Circuit, Iowa Speedway, Laguna Seca and Milwaukee Mile. The following day, the team announced that Nikita Johnson would drive the No. 18 at St. Petersburg and the Indianapolis Motor Speedway, complementing his full-time program in the GB3 Championship.
- On February 13, 2025, Juncos Hollinger Racing announced it had elected to temporarily step back from competing in Indy NXT to focus on their IndyCar efforts, thereby eliminating Miguel María García from the 2025 grid.
- On February 13, 2025, HMD Motorsports announced that USF Pro 2000 driver Liam Sceats would pilot the No. 30 car. Originally only announced for the round at St. Petersburg, Sceats remained in the car for the first seven rounds - bar the race at WWTR - and also entered the Laguna Seca double-header.
- On February 24, 2025, HMD Motorsports announced that USF2000 driver Evagoras Papasavvas would drive the team's No. 18 car for a part-time campaign at World Wide Technology Raceway, Road America and Mid-Ohio.

==== Mid-season ====
- On March 27, 2025, HMD Motorsports announced that Sophia Flörsch would not continue her campaign in the No. 24 car and exit the team and the series after just one race. The team announced on April 29 that Evagoras Papasavvas would pilot that car at Barber Motorsports Park and Indianapolis, making his Indy NXT debut a month earlier than originally planned.
- On April 29, 2025, Chip Ganassi Racing announced that Bryce Aron would take over its No. 9 entry after Jonathan Browne was forced to end his campaign due to budget issues. Aron therefore left HMD Motorsports and the No. 39 car after a single round.
- On May 7, 2025, HMD Motorsports announced that IMSA driver Juan Manuel Correa would make his US open-wheel debut in the No. 39 entry vacated by Aron. Correa would enter the rounds at Indianapolis, Detroit, Gateway, Mid-Ohio, Iowa, Laguna Seca and Portland.
- On May 14, 2025, HMD Motorsports announced that sprint car racer Davey Hamilton Jr. would drive the No. 24 entry vacated by Flörsch at the four oval events of the season, returning to Indy NXT after last entering three races in its predecessor series in 2016 and 2018.
- On July 25, 2025, Andretti Cape announced that it had parted ways with Ricardo Escotto ahead of the Laguna Seca double-header. On August 5, it was announced that Michael d'Orlando would take over the No. 3 Andretti Cape entry for the final three rounds of the season.
- On July 31, 2025, HMD Motorsports announced that USF Pro 2000 driver Nicholas Monteiro would drive the No. 24 entry at Portland, making his Indy NXT debut.
- On August 19, 2025, HMD Motorsports disclosed that Nolan Allaer and the No. 11 car would not enter the Milwaukee event due to "family and school obligations".

== Schedule ==
The 2025 schedule was announced on June 13, 2024. Indy NXT visited the same twelve locations as the year before.

Rd.	Date	Race name	Track	Location
1	March 2	Indy NXT by Firestone Grand Prix of St. Petersburg	S Streets of St. Petersburg	St. Petersburg, Florida
2	May 4	Indy NXT by Firestone Grand Prix of Alabama	R Barber Motorsports Park	Birmingham, Alabama
3	May 9	Indy NXT by Firestone Indianapolis Grand Prix	R Indianapolis Motor Speedway Road Course	Speedway, Indiana
4	May 10	Indy NXT by Firestone Indianapolis Grand Prix	R Indianapolis Motor Speedway Road Course	Speedway, Indiana
5	June 1	Indy NXT by Firestone Detroit Grand Prix	S Streets of Detroit	Detroit, Michigan
6	June 15	Indy NXT by Firestone at World Wide Technology Raceway	O World Wide Technology Raceway	Madison, Illinois
7	June 22	Indy NXT by Firestone Grand Prix at Road America	R Road America	Elkhart Lake, Wisconsin
8	July 6	Indy NXT by Firestone Grand Prix at Mid-Ohio	R Mid-Ohio Sports Car Course	Lexington, Ohio
9	July 12	Indy NXT by Firestone at Iowa Speedway	O Iowa Speedway	Newton, Iowa
10	July 26	Indy NXT by Firestone Grand Prix of Monterey	R WeatherTech Raceway Laguna Seca	Monterey, California
11	July 27	Indy NXT by Firestone Grand Prix of Monterey	R WeatherTech Raceway Laguna Seca	Monterey, California
12	August 10	Indy NXT by Firestone Grand Prix of Portland	R Portland International Raceway	Portland, Oregon
13	August 24	Indy NXT by Firestone at the Milwaukee Mile	O Milwaukee Mile	West Allis, Wisconsin
14	August 31	Indy NXT by Firestone Music City Grand Prix	O Nashville Superspeedway	Lebanon, Tennessee

Icon	Meaning
O	Oval track
R	Road course
S	Street circuit

== Race results ==
Rd.	Track	Pole position	Fastest lap	Most laps led	Race winner	
Rd.	Track	Pole position	Fastest lap	Most laps led	Driver	Team
1	Streets of St. Petersburg	(Norway) Dennis Hauger	(Norway) Dennis Hauger	(Norway) Dennis Hauger	(Norway) Dennis Hauger	Andretti Global
2	Barber Motorsports Park	(Norway) Dennis Hauger	(Norway) Dennis Hauger	(Norway) Dennis Hauger	(Norway) Dennis Hauger	Andretti Global
3	Indianapolis Motor Speedway Road Course	(Australia) Lochie Hughes	(Australia) Lochie Hughes	(Australia) Lochie Hughes	(Australia) Lochie Hughes	Andretti Global
4	Indianapolis Motor Speedway Road Course	(Australia) Lochie Hughes	(United States) Josh Pierson	(Norway) Dennis Hauger	(Norway) Dennis Hauger	Andretti Global
5	Detroit Street Circuit	(Norway) Dennis Hauger	(Australia) Lochie Hughes	(Norway) Dennis Hauger	(Norway) Dennis Hauger	Andretti Global
6	World Wide Technology Raceway	(Norway) Dennis Hauger	(Brazil) Caio Collet	(Brazil) Caio Collet	(Australia) Lochie Hughes	Andretti Global
7	Road America	(Norway) Dennis Hauger	(Brazil) Caio Collet	(Norway) Dennis Hauger	(Brazil) Caio Collet	HMD Motorsports
8	Mid-Ohio Sports Car Course	(Norway) Dennis Hauger	(Brazil) Caio Collet	(Norway) Dennis Hauger	(Norway) Dennis Hauger	Andretti Global
9	Iowa Speedway	(Norway) Dennis Hauger	(Norway) Dennis Hauger	(Norway) Dennis Hauger	(United States) Myles Rowe	Abel Motorsports with Force Indy
10	WeatherTech Raceway Laguna Seca	(Brazil) Caio Collet	(Norway) Dennis Hauger	(Brazil) Caio Collet	(Brazil) Caio Collet	HMD Motorsports
11	WeatherTech Raceway Laguna Seca	(Brazil) Caio Collet	(Brazil) Caio Collet	(Brazil) Caio Collet	(Brazil) Caio Collet	HMD Motorsports
12	Portland International Raceway	(Brazil) Caio Collet	(Norway) Dennis Hauger	(Norway) Dennis Hauger	(Norway) Dennis Hauger	Andretti Global
13	Milwaukee Mile	(Norway) Dennis Hauger	(Mexico) Salvador de Alba	(Mexico) Salvador de Alba	(Mexico) Salvador de Alba	Andretti Global
14	Nashville Superspeedway	(Mexico) Salvador de Alba	(United States) Jordan Missig	(Mexico) Salvador de Alba	(United States) Myles Rowe	Abel Motorsports with Force Indy

== Season report ==
=== Opening rounds ===
The 2025 Indy NXT season began with a brilliant debut for Andretti's Dennis Hauger, who broke the track record in qualifying around the Streets of St. Petersburg to claim pole position. He led from the outset of the race, which was interrupted early by multiple crashes leading to three caution periods. Despite pressure from his teammate Lochie Hughes at each restart, Hauger gradually pulled clear after the third interruption ended on lap 24 and established a commanding lead, before a late crash for Abel/Miller Vinatieri Motorsports’ Jack William Miller brought out the pace car, ending the race under caution. Hauger secured victory ahead of Hughes, with HMD Motorsports’ Caio Collet third.

Hauger carried his dominant form into Barber Motorsports Park, taking pole position on a drying track with a lap over half a second clear of the field, while Collet topped the first group to start second. Hauger led from the rolling start but, incidents during the opening part of the race caused two cautions. During that period, Collet encountered throttle problems that dropped him out of contention, leaving Hughes, Abel/Force Indy’s Myles Rowe and HMD’s Evagoras Papasavvas to fight for the remaining podium places. Hauger steadily built a gap of over 11 seconds to win ahead of Papasavvas, who resisted Hughes to finish second on debut. Hauger extended his championship lead to 29 points.

Hughes led qualifying on the Indianapolis Motor Speedway Road Course to secure both pole positions of the weekend. At the start of race one, Hauger’s attempt to take the lead around the outside of turn one ended in contact with Rowe and HMD’s Callum Hedge, sending him off track and dropping him to the back of the field. Collet took advantage to slot into second, while Hughes built an early gap. Two cautions interrupted proceedings, but Hughes managed both restarts and controlled the race throughout, eventually finishing ahead of Collet and Rowe. Hauger recovered to eighth, allowing him to narrowly retain the championship lead by three points over Hughes, with Rowe third.

Hughes once again started from pole position for race two at Indianapolis, with Hauger alongside on the front row. An early caution was triggered by a multi-car clash involving Miller, Andretti’s James Roe, and HMD’s Nolan Allaer, which also delayed Abel’s Jordan Missig and HMD’s Nikita Johnson. On the restart, Hauger made his move on Hughes to take the lead, and although his team-mate stayed close for much of the distance, Hauger gradually edged away to win by almost five seconds. Behind them, Rowe and Andretti’s Salvador de Alba secured third and fourth. Hauger extended his points lead to 187, ahead of Hughes on 172 points and Rowe losing ground in third on 134 points.

Hauger was back in front for qualifying at Detroit, ahead of Hughes. The race began with chaos as contact between Hedge and Rowe triggered a multi-car pile-up at turn four, blocking the track and causing a stoppage. At the restart, Hauger led Hughes and de Alba. The Andretti pair fought, both suffered damage and were forced to pit, handing a huge lead to Hauger. His gap was then eradicated when Missig hit the barriers and caused a late caution. That set up a one-lap dash to the finish, which Hauger managed to win ahead of Collet. HMD’s Juan Manuel Correa claimed his first podium in just his third race in third as Hauger extended his championship lead to 240 points, 38 points ahead of Hughes.

=== Mid-season rounds ===
Round six saw the season’s first oval race at WWTR. Hauger took pole position in a rain-delayed qualifying session, with Collet second. The Brazilian immediately passed Hauger to take the lead, while Hughes endured a difficult opening lap and slipped back from fifth. The lead pair quickly broke away from the rest of the field, with Rowe running in third. The order remained largely static, until Hughes started charging through the field using the high line. He quickly reeled in the leaders to move into the lead by lap 62 and pulled away. Rowe followed Hughes’ path forward in the closing laps, ending up in second ahead of Collet. Hughes’ won the race to cut Hauger’s championship lead to 19 points.

Hauger took his fifth pole position of the year at Road America, narrowly denying Collet in qualifying. He led the opening laps of the race, holding off Collet’s challenge through the first corners. The pair soon pulled clear of the field, with HMD's Josh Pierson running a distant third. Collet slowly closed the gap to Hauger, but with no push-to-pass available, he had to wait until Hauger made a small error on lap 15. Collet drew alongside to take the lead and with it the win. Hughes and Pierson fought closely for the final podium spot all race, with the Australian eventually getting by. Hauger extended his advantage in the championship to 28 points over Hughes, with Collet strengthening his hold on third.

Mid-Ohio saw Hauger claim another pole position with a new track record. He maintained his lead at the start of the race, holding off Collet and Hughes before a dramatic crash on lap four brought out a lengthy red flag. The Andretti Cape pair of Sebastian Murray and Ricardo Escotto made contact, sending Murray’s car airborne before landing heavily near the pit straight barriers. When the race resumed under timed conditions, Hauger controlled the restart and gradually pulled away from Collet, who could not match his pace, with Hughes close behind in third. The front group remained stable through to the finish as Hauger took win number five of the year to extend his lead to 45 points.

Iowa Speedway hosted round nine. Severe storms disrupted the schedule: qualifying was cancelled and points leader Hauger was awarded pole position. Rowe made the best start from fourth to move past Collet and soon challenged Hughes, whose stern defence earned him a penalty. That left Hauger and Rowe to battle for the lead through several early caution periods. Once racing settled, Hauger held a narrow advantage until Rowe used traffic to sweep around the outside. He became the first black driver to win in Indy NXT, while de Alba overtook Collet late on for third place. With Hughes down in 16th after his penalty, Hauger once again grew his championship lead to 76 points.

Next up was a double-header at Laguna Seca, where Collet claimed pole position for both races in a weather-delayed qualifying. He made the most of his starting position in race one, leading the opening laps before a multi-car incident in the first corners eliminated Missig and de Alba and delayed several others, prompting an early caution. When racing resumed, Collet built a small gap over Hauger as Rowe pressured Pierson for third. Hauger later closed in again and ran nose-to-tail with the leader over the final laps, but Collet held firm to win by just two tenths of a second. Pierson claimed his first Indy NXT podium in third as Collet moved into second in the standings, 81 points behind Hauger.

=== Closing rounds ===
Race two began with chaos once again, with Collet leading the field as a collision between CGR's Bryce Aron and the HMD pair of Liam Sceats and Tommy Smith brought out the first caution. On the restart, Hauger ran wide and lost second to Pierson, then came under pressure from Hughes. A second caution on lap 17 was followed by a multi-car tangle involving Missig, Correa, Allaer and his HMD teammate Hailie Deegan that neutralised the race again. Soon after, contact between Hughes and Hauger caused a final caution, ending Hauger’s race and dropping Hughes down the order. Collet handled each restart to lead Pierson and Hedge home, cutting Hauger's championship lead to 42 points.

Collet secured his third consecutive pole position at Portland, denying Hauger with a last-lap effort. At the start of the race, Hauger made a brilliant double pass on Collet and Rowe through the opening complex to take the lead. Behind them, Aron spun, triggering a chain reaction that sent several cars off-track and forced a caution, with Hughes in need of a new front wing. On the restart, Collet shadowed Hauger but was unable to challenge the Norwegian, who controlled the pace to the flag and won by just under a second. Rowe completed the podium as, with two rounds remaining, Hauger extended his standings lead to 54 points over Collet, with Hughes still mathematically in contention.

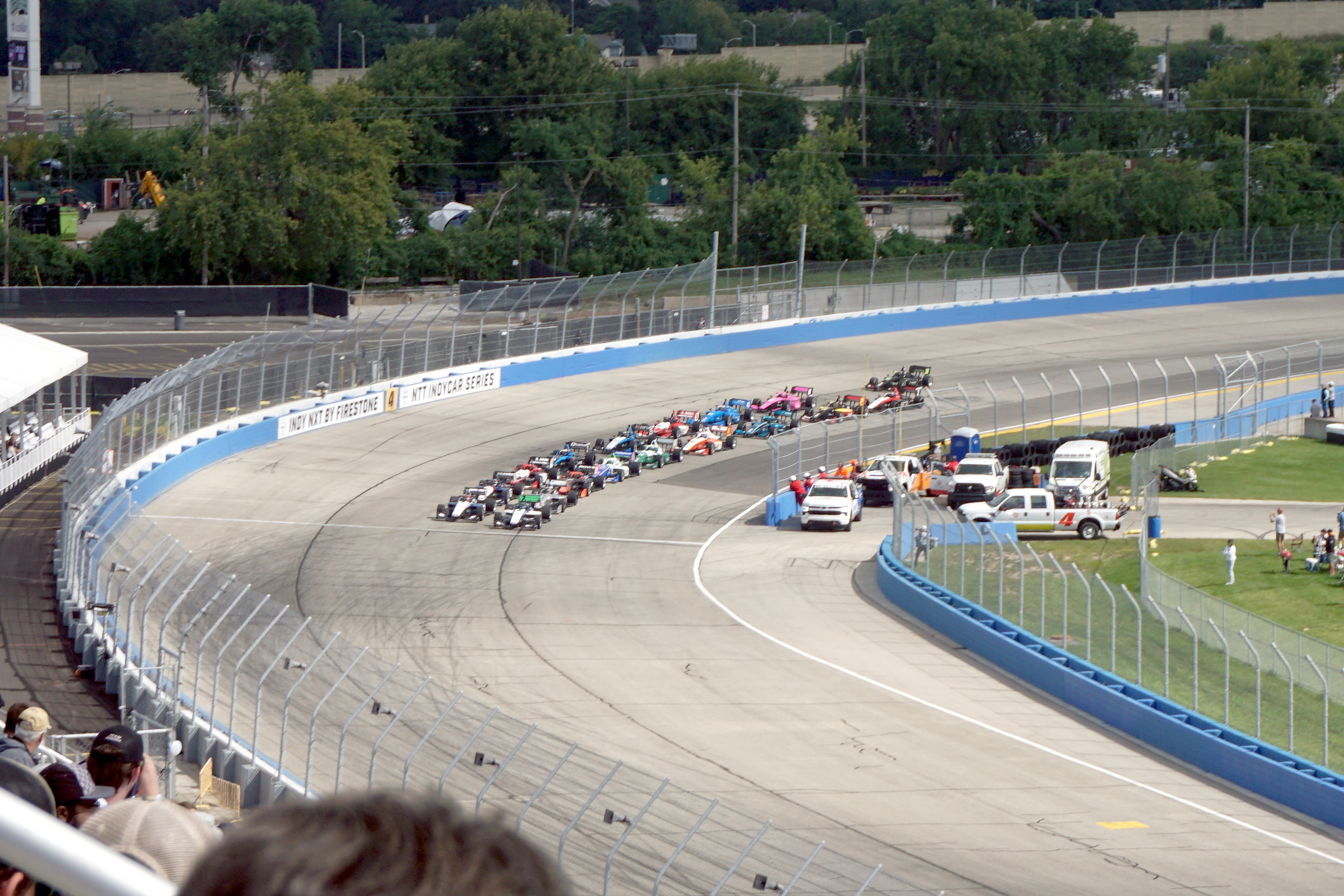
Start of the Indy NXT by Firestone at the Milwaukee Mile

Hauger ended Collet's pole position streak at the Milwaukee Mile with a two-lap average nearly a full mile per hour faster than the rest of the field. De Alba started second, but passed Hauger straight away and steadily built a gap. Hughes soon took third from Hedge, forming an all-Andretti top three that remained static until a caution was triggered when Miller spun into the wall on lap 45. On the restart, Hauger closed up on de Alba but opted not to challenge his teammate, who went on to take his maiden Indy NXT victory. Hughes followed them home in third as Hauger’s second-place finish handed him an unassailabe 69-point lead over Collet to seal the championship with one race remaining.

De Alba followed his maiden win with a maiden pole position for the final race in Nashville, ahead of Collet and Hauger. At the start, de Alba held firm under early pressure from Collet, while Rowe began a charge through the pack, quickly moving into the top five. After overtaking Hughes and repelling a brief attack from Cape's Michael d’Orlando, Rowe swept past Hauger for third and then dispatched Collet to take second place. A collision between d’Orlando and Hedge triggered a caution at mid-distance, bringing Rowe onto de Alba’s rear wing. When racing resumed, Rowe tracked the leader closely before diving past with just over 20 laps to go and edging clear to win by 0.4376 seconds.

Hauger entered the 2025 Indy NXT season as the overwhelming title favourite. With six victories, five additional podiums, and only two finishes outside the top five, Hauger’s campaign was one of commanding consistency. Behind him, Collet emerged as his closest challenger, while Hughes and Rowe also became two-time winners. Andretti Global won nine of the 14 races to take three of the top five entrant spots while delivering their second Drivers' Championship in a row.

== Championship standings ==
Scoring system

Position	**1st**	**2nd**	**3rd**	**4th**	**5th**	**6th**	**7th**	**8th**	**9th**	**10th**	**11th**	**12th**	**13th**	**14th**	**15th**	**16th**	**17th**	**18th**	**19th**	**20th**	**21st**
Points	50	40	35	32	30	28	26	24	22	20	19	18	17	16	15	14	13	12	11	10	9

- The fastest driver in each qualifying session was awarded one additional point.
- Every driver who led at least one lap was awarded a bonus point, the driver who led the most laps got two points.

=== Drivers' championship ===
Pos	Driver	STP	ALA	IMS		DET	GAT	ROA	MOH	IOW	LAG		POR	MIL	NSH	Points
1	(Norway) Dennis Hauger	**1**^{L}*	**1**^{L}*	8	1^{L}*	**1**^{L}*	**5**^{L}	**2**^{L}*	**1**^{L}*	**2**^{1L}*	2	16	1^{L}*	**2**	3	599
2	(Brazil) Caio Collet	3	19	2	5	2	3^{L}*	1^{L}	2	4	**1**^{L}*	**1**^{L}*	**2**	7	4	527
3	(Australia) Lochie Hughes	2	3	**1**^{L}*	**2**^{L}	5	1^{L}	3	3	16	6	15	10	3	5	466
4	(United States) Myles Rowe	4	4	3	3	18	2	5	10	1^{L}	4	8	3	6	1^{L}	458
5	(Mexico) Salvador de Alba	5	11	5	4	8	4	8	4	3	19	9	5	1^{L}*	**2**^{L}*	418
6	(United States) Josh Pierson	9	5	6	9	4	6	4	5	11	3	2	11	11	9	378
7	(New Zealand) Callum Hedge	8	18	4	10	11	7	6	6	6	5	3	4	4	18	358
8	(Netherlands) Niels Koolen	21	13	18	6	9	10	15	14	5	11	6	6	12	7	288
9	(United States) Jordan Missig	6	12	11	17	12	11	19	7	8	18	10	8	13	8	273
10	(United States) Jack William Miller	16	8	9	19	7	19	7	11	14	7	7	13	17	15	266
11	(United States) Bryce Aron	13	15	15	15	10	14	9	12	9	10	19	19	5	6	260
12	(Republic of Ireland) James Roe	20	10	19	11	13	18	14	13	7	14	13	18	9	10	235
13	(United Kingdom) Sebastian Murray	17	16	12	12	6	12	11	18	Wth	17	5	16	16	11	230
14	(United States) Hailie Deegan	14	17	17	18	16	16	18	17	18	12	11	17	14	13	202
15	(Australia) Tommy Smith	15	14	13	21	17	17	17	15	17	13	12	12	18	17	202
16	(United States) Nolan Allaer	19	20	16	20	15	9	16	16	19	9	14	15		12	192
17	(United States) Juan Manuel Correa			21	14	3	8		8	12	15	17	9			176
18	(New Zealand) Liam Sceats	18	6	7	8	14		10			8	18				162
19	(Mexico) Ricardo Escotto	10	9	14	16	20	13	13	19	13						144
20	(United States) Max Taylor		7			19				10	16	4		10		123
21	(United States) Evagoras Papasavvas		2	10	13			12	9							117
22	(United States) Michael d'Orlando												7	8	14	66
23	(United States) Davey Hamilton Jr.						15			15				15	16	59
24	(United States) Nikita Johnson	11		20	7											55
25	(Republic of Ireland) Jonathan Browne	7														26
26	(Germany) Sophia Flörsch	12														18
27	(Brazil) Nicholas Monteiro												14			16
Pos	Driver	STP	ALA	IMS		DET	GAT	ROA	MOH	IOW	LAG		POR	MIL	NSH	Points

Color	Result
Gold	Winner
Silver	2nd place
Bronze	3rd place
Green	4th & 5th place
Light Blue	6th–10th place
Dark Blue	Finished (Outside Top 10)
Purple	Did not finish
Red	Did not qualify (DNQ)
Brown	Withdrawn (Wth)
Black	Disqualified (DSQ)
White	Did not start (DNS)
Blank	Did not participate (DNP)
Blank	Not competing

**In-line notation**
**Bold**	Pole position (1 point)
Italics	Ran fastest race lap
^{L}	Led a race lap (1 point)
*	Led most race laps (2 points)
^{1}	Qualifying cancelled no bonus point awarded
Rookie
Rookie of the Year

- Ties in points broken by number of wins, or best finishes.

=== Entrants' championship ===
Entrants scored points in the same way drivers score points, including bonus points for pole position and laps led.

Pos	Entry	STP	ALA	IMS		DET	GAT	ROA	MOH	IOW	LAG		POR	MIL	NSH	Points
1	#28 Andretti Global	**1**^{L}*	**1**^{L}*	8	1^{L}*	**1**^{L}*	**5^{L}**	**2**^{L}	**1**^{L}*	**2**^{1L}*	2	16	1^{L}*	**2**	3	599
2	#76 HMD Motorsports	3	19	2	5	2	3^{L}*	1^{L}	2	4	**1**^{L}*	**1**^{L}*	**2**	7	4	527
3	#26 Andretti Global	2	3	**1**^{L}*	**2**^{L}	5	1^{L}	3	3	16	6	15	10	3	5	466
4	#99 Abel Motorsports with Force Indy	4	4	3	3	18	2	5	10	1^{L}	4	8	3	6	1^{L}	458
5	#27 Andretti Global	5	11	5	4	8	4	8	4	3	19	9	5	1^{L}*	**2**^{L}*	418
6	#14 HMD Motorsports	9	5	6	9	4	6	4	5	11	3	2	11	11	9	378
7	#17 Abel Motorsports	8	18	4	10	11	7	6	6	6	5	3	4	4	18	358
8	#10 Chip Ganassi Racing	21	13	18	6	9	10	15	14	5	11	6	6	12	7	288
9	#48 Abel Motorsports	6	12	11	17	12	11	19	7	8	18	10	8	13	8	273
10	#9 Chip Ganassi Racing	7	15	15	15	10	14	9	12	9	10	19	19	5	6	269
11	#40 Abel Motorsports with Miller Vinatieri Motorsports	16	8	9	19	7	19	7	11	14	7	7	13	17	15	266
12	#29 Andretti Global	20	10	19	11	13	18	14	13	7	14	13	18	9	10	235
13	#2 Andretti Cape Indy NXT	17	16	12	12	6	12	11	18	Wth	17	5	16	16	11	230
14	#24 HMD Motorsports	12	2	10	13		15	12	9	15			14	15	16	210
15	#3 Andretti Cape Indy NXT	10	9	14	16	20	13	13	19	13			7	8	14	210
16	#38 HMD Motorsports	14	17	17	18	16	16	18	17	18	12	11	17	14	13	202
17	#16 HMD Motorsports	15	14	13	21	17	17	17	15	17	13	12	12	18	17	202
18	#39 HMD Motorsports	13		21	14	3	8		8	12	15	17	9			193
19	#11 HMD Motorsports	19	20	16	20	15	9	16	16	19	9	14	15		12	192
20	#18 HMD Motorsports	11	7	20	7	19				10	16	4		10		178
21	#30 HMD Motorsports	18	6	7	8	14		10			8	18				162
Pos	Entry	STP	ALA	IMS		DET	GAT	ROA	MOH	IOW	LAG		POR	MIL	NSH	Points

== See also ==
- 2025 IndyCar Series
- 2025 USF Pro 2000 Championship
- 2025 USF2000 Championship
- 2025 USF Juniors
