= Yeoroo Lee =

American racing driver (born 2006)

- Nationality: (South Korea) Korean (United States) American
- Born: October 5, 2006 (age 20) Fair Lawn, New Jersey, U.S.

U.S. F2000 National Championship career
- Debut season: 2022
- Current team: Jay Howard Driver Development
- Car number: 7
- Starts: 6
- Wins: 0
- Podiums: 0
- Poles: 0
- Fastest laps: 0
- Best finish: TBA in 2022

Yeoroo Lee (born October 5, 2006) is a Korean-American racing driver. He last competed in the U.S. F2000 National Championship with Jay Howard Driver Development.

== Racing record ==
=== Career summary ===
| Season | Series | Team | Races | Wins | Poles | F/Laps | Podiums | Points | Position |
|---|---|---|---|---|---|---|---|---|---|
| 2022 | U.S. F2000 National Championship | Jay Howard Driver Development | 6 | 0 | 0 | 0 | 0 | 29 | 24th |

*Season still in progress.

=== American open-wheel racing results ===
==== U.S. F2000 National Championship ====
(key) (Races in bold indicate pole position) (Races in italics indicate fastest lap) (Races with * indicate most race laps led)

| Year | Team | 1 | 2 | 3 | 4 | 5 | 6 | 7 | 8 | 9 | 10 | 11 | 12 | 13 | 14 | 15 | 16 | 17 | 18 | Rank | Points |
|---|---|---|---|---|---|---|---|---|---|---|---|---|---|---|---|---|---|---|---|---|---|
| 2022 | Jay Howard Driver Development | STP; 1; 16 | STP; 2; 9 | ALA; 1; 18 | ALA; 2; 15 | IMS; 1 DNS | IMS; 2; 23 | IMS; 3; 17 | IRP | ROA; 1 | ROA; 2 | MOH; 1 | MOH; 2 | MOH; 3 | TOR; 1 | TOR; 2 | POR; 1 | POR; 2 | POR; 3 | 24th | 29 |

*Season still in progress.
