= Christian Weir =

American racing driver (born 2006)

- Nationality: (United States) American
- Born: September 24, 2006 (age 20) Naperville, Illinois, U.S.

USF Pro 2000 Championship career
- Debut season: 2023
- Current team: TJ Speed Motorsports
- Car number: 32
- Starts: 7
- Wins: 0
- Podiums: 0
- Poles: 0
- Fastest laps: 0
- Best finish: TBD in 2023

Previous series
- 2021-22 2021 2021: USF2000 Championship; Eastern Pro 4 Challenge; F4 US Championship

Championship titles
- 2021: Eastern Pro 4 Challenge

Christian Weir (born September 24, 2006) is an American racing driver. He currently competes in the U.S. F2000 National Championship with Turn 3 Motorsport.

== Career ==
=== U.S. F2000 National Championship ===
In 2021, Weir would make his debut in the series at the Mid-Ohio round with Turn 3 Motorsport and contest the rest of the season.

On December 2, 2021, it was announced that Weir would run full-time in 2022 once again with Turn 3 Motorsport.

== Racing record ==
=== Racing career summary ===
Season	Series	Team	Races	Wins	Poles	F/Laps	Podiums	Points	Position
2021	Eastern Pro 4 Challenge	Turn 3 Motorsport	8	6	5	4	8	412	**1st**
2021	U.S. F2000 National Championship	Turn 3 Motorsport	8	0	0	1	0	57	21st
2021	Formula 4 United States Championship	Gonella Racing	5	0	0	0	2	36	13th
2021	Radical Cup North America – Pro 1340	Team Stradale	6	5	5	6	5	?	?
2022	U.S. F2000 National Championship	Turn 3 Motorsport	18	0	1	1	2	229	8th
2023	USF Pro 2000 Championship	TJ Speed Motorsports	13	0	1	0	0	119	16th
2024	Toyota GR Cup North America	TechSport Racing	4	0	1	1	1	28	11th

*Season still in progress.

=== American open-wheel racing results ===
==== U.S. F2000 National Championship ====
(key) (Races in bold indicate pole position) (Races in italics indicate fastest lap) (Races with * indicate most race laps led)

Year	Team	1	2	3	4	5	6	7	8	9	10	11	12	13	14	15	16	17	18	Rank	Points
2021	Turn 3 Motorsport	ALA; 1	ALA; 2	STP; 1	STP; 2	IMS; 1	IMS; 2	IMS; 3	LOR	ROA; 1	ROA; 2	MOH; 1; 17	MOH; 2; 19	MOH; 3; 20	NJMP; 1; 12	NJMP; 2; 9	NJMP; 3; 6	MOH; 4; 9	MOH; 5; 20	21st	57
2022	Turn 3 Motorsport	STP; 1; 10	STP; 2; 14	ALA; 1; 7	**ALA**; **2**; 3	IMS; 1; 4	IMS; 2; 22	IMS; 3; 12	IRP; 11	ROA; 1; 7	ROA; 2; 11	MOH; 1; 6	MOH; 2; 16	MOH; 3; 10	TOR; 1; 8	TOR; 2; 9	POR; 1; 11	POR; 2; 5	POR; 3; 3	8th	229

==== USF Pro 2000 Championship ====
(key) (Races in bold indicate pole position) (Races in italics indicate fastest lap) (Races with * indicate most race laps led)

Year	Team	1	2	3	4	5	6	7	8	9	10	11	12	13	14	15	16	17	18	Rank	Points
2023	TJ Speed Motorsports	STP; 1; 17	STP; 2; 10	SEB; 1; 10	SEB; 2; 13	IMS; 1; 8	IMS; 2; 6	IRP; 17	ROA; 1; 9	**ROA**; **2**; 15	MOH; 1; 8	MOH; 2; 14	TOR; 1; 12	TOR; 2; 17	COTA; 1	COTA; 1	POR; 1	POR; 2	POR; 3	16th	119

=== Complete Formula 4 United States Championship results ===
(key) (Races in bold indicate pole position) (Races in italics indicate fastest lap)

Year	Team	1	2	3	4	5	6	7	8	9	10	11	12	13	14	15	16	17	Pos	Points
2021	Gonella Racing	ATL; 1	ATL; 2	ATL; 3	ROA; 1	ROA; 2	ROA; 3	MOH; 1	MOH; 2	MOH; 3	BRA; 1	BRA; 2	BRA; 3	VIR; 1; 3	VIR; 2 Ret	VIR; 3; 7	COA; 1; 3	COA; 2 Ret	13th	36
