= Nikita Johnson =

American racing driver (born 2008)

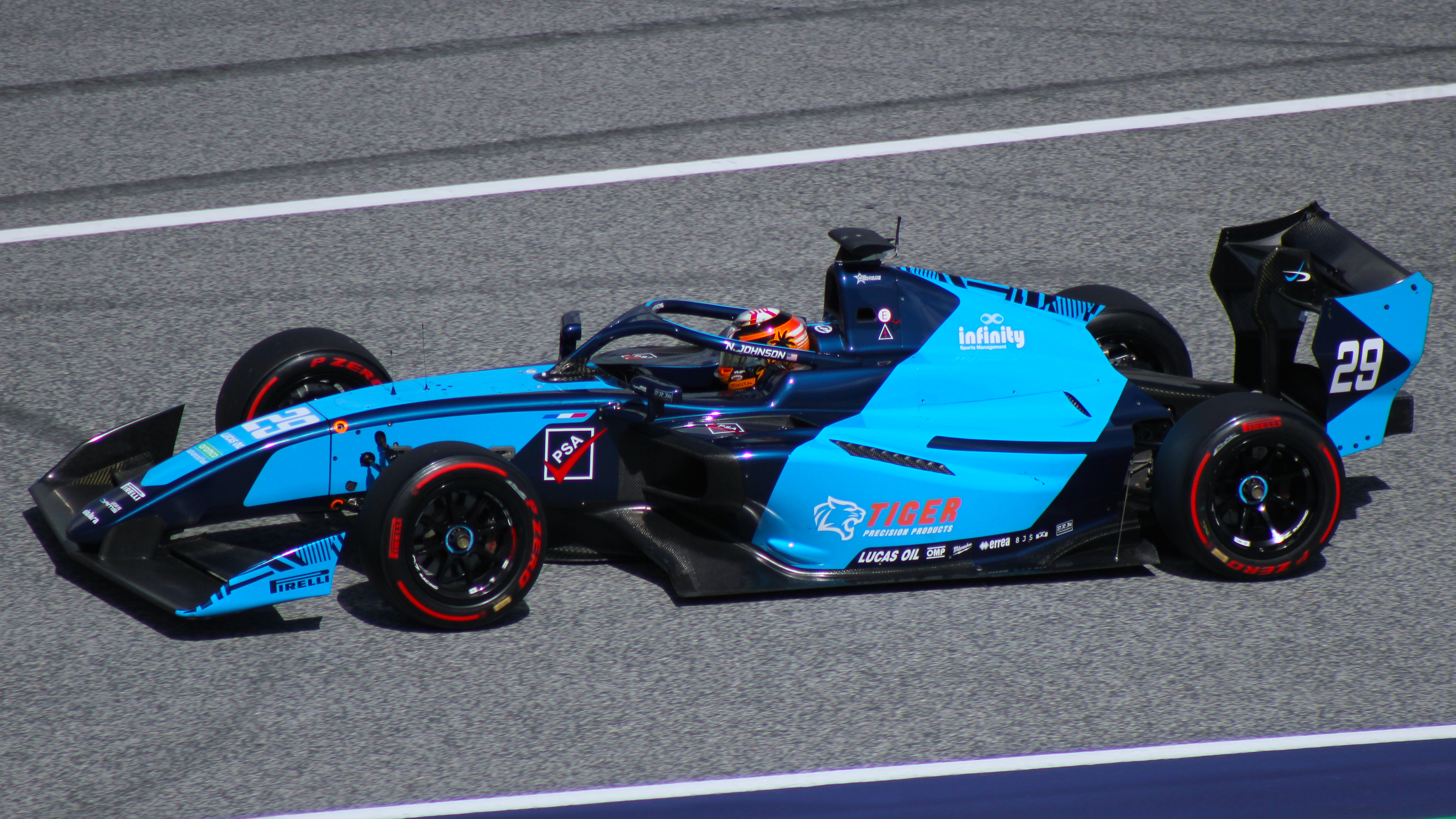
- Johnson driving the Dallara F3 2025 during the 2025 Spielberg Formula 3 round
- Nationality: (United States) American
- Born: Nikita Andreas Johnson; May 25, 2008 (age 18) Saint Petersburg, Florida, U.S
- Categorisation: FIA Silver

IndyCar Series career
- Team: No. 19 (Dale Coyne Racing)
Wins	Podiums	Poles
0	0	0

Previous series
- 2025—26 2025 2025 2024–2025 2023–24 2022–23 2022 2022: Indy NXT; FIA Formula 3 FR Oceania Championship; GB3 Championship; USF Pro 2000 Championship; USF2000 Championship; USF Juniors; YACademy Winter Series

Championship titles
- 2026 2022: Indy NXT; YACademy Winter Series

Awards
- 2026: Indy NXT Rookie of the Year

Nikita Andreas Johnson (born May 25, 2008) is an American racing driver who is set to compete in the IndyCar Series, driving the No. 19 Honda for Dale Coyne Racing.

Johnson won the 2026 Indy NXT championship with Cape Motorsports Powered by ECR and finished runner-up in the 2024 USF Pro 2000 Championship driving for Velocity Racing Development. He also raced in FIA Formula 3 for DAMS and Hitech TGR in 2025.

== Racing career ==
=== USF2000 Championship ===
==== 2023 ====
On October 6, 2022, it was announced that Johnson would compete full-time in the 2023 USF2000 Championship driving for Velocity Racing Development. This was after a campaign in the USF Juniors series where he finished third overall after taking three wins, an additional seven podiums, two poles and 352 points.

=== USF Pro 2000 Championship ===
==== 2023 ====
On August 21, 2023, Johnson announced that he would make his USF Pro 2000 Championship debut at the Circuit of the Americas driving for Velocity Racing Development. He would compete in rounds 14-18.

In race 1 at COTA, Johnson would finish on the podium behind fellow USF Pro 2000 debutant Mac Clark and race winner Kiko Porto. In race 2, Johnson started third behind Clark and Porto. He managed to get past Clark in the opening laps and closed the gap to Porto. On lap seven, Johnson battled with Porto for the lead and Johnson emerged victorious. He extended his gap to Porto to over seventeen seconds by races end to win the race. Johnson not only became the youngest race winner in the history of the USF Pro 2000 Championship at the age of fifteen, but he also became the first driver to win on all three levels of the USF Pro Championships ladder.

At the final round of the season at Portland International Raceway, Johnson qualified seven tenths of a second off pole position. In the final race of the season, Johnson lined up second alongside Michael d'Orlando. Johnson would take the lead of the race going into the first corner. The race was hectic with multiple safety cars and on-track incidents. After the final restart on lap 23, the race would remain green for the final seven laps, and Johnson would go on to win his second race in only five starts.

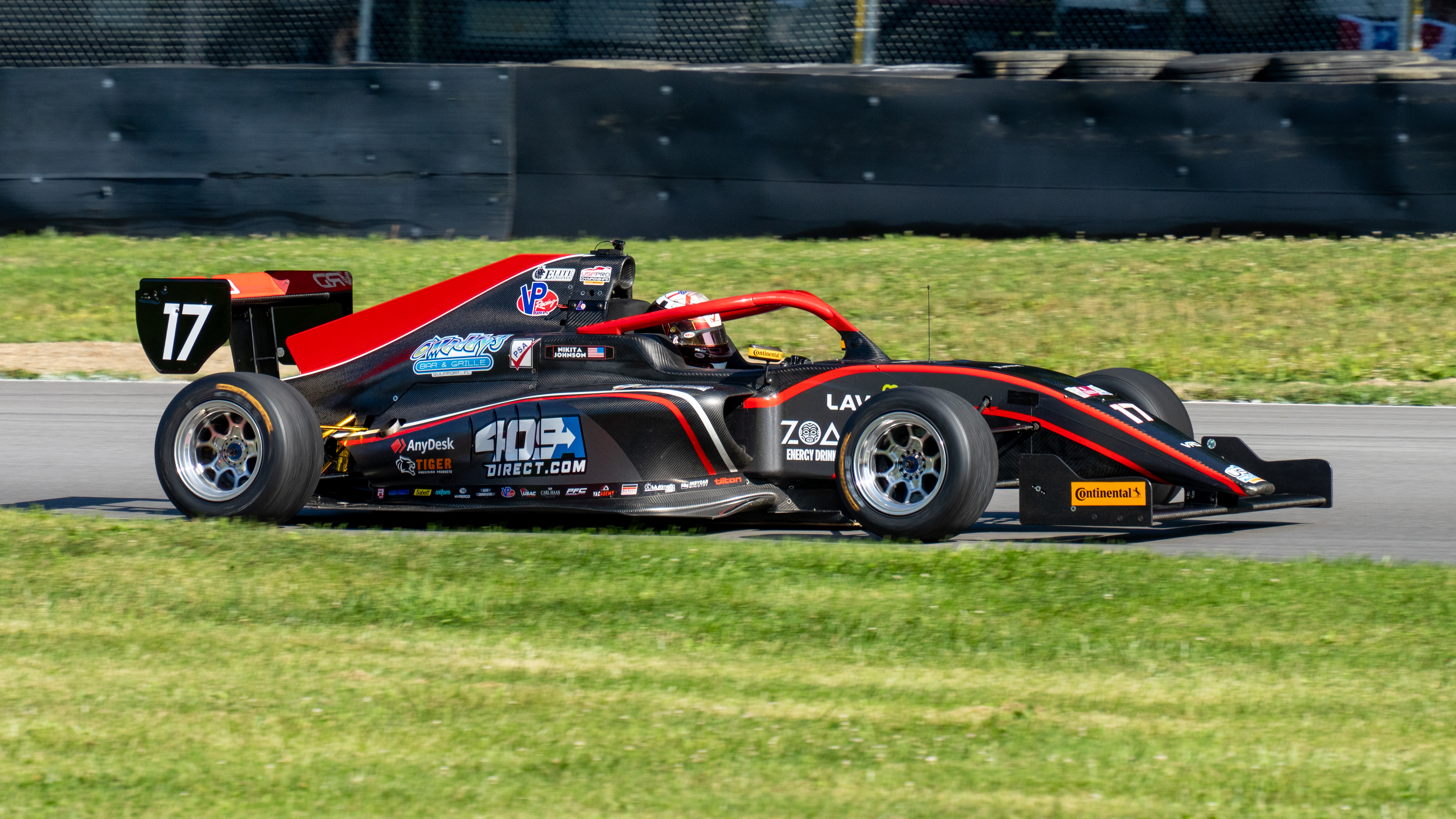
Johnson at the Mid-Ohio Sports Car Course in 2024

==== 2024 ====
On November 30, 2023, it was announced that Johnson would compete full-time in the 2024 USF Pro 2000 Championship driving for Velocity Racing Development. In 2024, Johnson would take eight wins, another two podium finishes, seven pole positions and 355 points to finish second place in the overall standings.

=== GB3 Championship ===
==== 2024 ====
On February 21, 2024, Johnson announced that he would be participating in the 2024 GB3 Championship driving for VRD Racing by Arden. However, he only began the GB3 season from round three since he had to sit out the first two rounds because he was still only fifteen years old at the time, and the minimum age requirement for GB3 is sixteen.

==== 2025 ====
Johnson contested his first full season of GB3 in 2025, moving over to Hitech Pulse-Eight.

=== Formula regional ===
==== 2025 ====
At the start of 2025, Johnson competed in the Formula Regional Oceania Championship with M2 Competition.

=== FIA Formula 3 ===
==== 2025 ====
Johnson made his debut in the FIA Formula 3 Championship at the Spielberg round, where drove for DAMS Lucas Oil after Nicola Lacorte was given a one-round suspension. He qualified last, finishing eighteenth in the sprint race and 22nd in the feature. Just days later, Johnson was confirmed by Hitech Pulse-Eight to compete for them during the Silverstone round a week later, replacing Jesse Carrasquedo Jr. He finished 27th and 26th at Silverstone, being promoted to 23rd in the feature race following penalties to other cars. He was replaced in the Spa-Francorchamps round by Freddie Slater, but returned the next time out in Budapest.

=== Indy NXT ===
==== 2025 ====
Johnson raced in selected rounds of the 2025 Indy NXT with HMD Motorsports.

==== 2026 ====
In 2026, Johnson competed full-time for the Indy NXT season with Cape Motorsports. Johnson won the championship following the second race at Laguna Seca.

=== IndyCar Series ===
==== 2027 ====
On October 27, 2026, Johnson passed his IndyCar evaluation and licensing test at Barber Motorsports Park driving for Dale Coyne Racing. On November 10, it was announced that Johnson will compete full-time in the 2027 IndyCar Series season, driving the No. 19 Honda for DCR.

=== Endurance racing ===
==== 2026 ====
At the start of 2026, Johnson was confirmed to make his endurance racing debut in the GTD Pro class with RLL Team McLaren during the 24 Hours of Daytona.

== Racing record ==
=== Career summary ===
Season	Series	Team	Races	Wins	Poles	F/Laps	Podiums	Points	Position
2022	YACademy Winter Series	Velocity Racing Development	6	3	1	3	5	103	**1st**
2022	USF Juniors	Velocity Racing Development	16	3	2	5	10	352	**3rd**
2022	USF2000 Championship	Velocity Racing Development	8	0	0	1	1	85	18th
2023	USF2000 Championship	Velocity Racing Development	18	1	2	2	8	344	**2nd**
2023	USF Pro 2000 Championship	Velocity Racing Development	5	2	0	2	4	118	17th
2024	USF Pro 2000 Championship	Velocity Racing Development	18	8	7	8	10	355	**2nd**
2024	GB3 Championship	VRD Racing by Arden	18	2	0	1	2	193	11th
2025	Formula Regional Oceania Championship	M2 Competition	15	1	0	1	6	305	**3rd**
2025	Indy NXT	HMD Motorsports	3	0	0	0	0	55	24th
2025	GB3 Championship	Hitech TGR	12	0	0	0	2	138	16th
2025	FIA Formula 3 Championship	DAMS Lucas Oil	2	0	0	0	0	0	32nd
2025	FIA Formula 3 Championship	Hitech TGR	6	0	0	0	0	0	32nd
2026	Indy NXT	Cape Motorsports Powered by ECR	17	2	0	0	9	585	**1st**
2026	IMSA SportsCar Championship - GTD Pro	RLL Team McLaren	10	0	0	1	0	2392	9th
2027	IndyCar Series	Dale Coyne Racing						-*	-*

=== American open–wheel racing results ===
==== USF Juniors ====
(key) (Races in bold indicate pole position) (Races in italics indicate fastest lap) (Races with * indicate most race laps led)

Year	Team	1	2	3	4	5	6	7	8	9	10	11	12	13	14	15	16	17	Rank	Points
2022	Velocity Racing Development	OIR; 1; 2	OIR; 2; 6	OIR; 3 C	ALA; 1; 3	ALA; 2; 5	VIR; 1; 2	VIR; 2; 13	VIR; 3; 4	MOH; 1; 4	MOH; 2; 3	MOH; 3; 2	ROA; 1; 3	ROA; 2; 1	ROA; 3; 3	COA; 1; 1	**COA**; **2**; 10	**COA**; **3**; 1	3rd	352

==== USF2000 Championship ====
(key) (Races in bold indicate pole position) (Races in italics indicate fastest lap) (Races with * indicate most race laps led)

Year	Team	1	2	3	4	5	6	7	8	9	10	11	12	13	14	15	16	17	18	Rank	Points
2022	Velocity Racing Development	STP; 1	STP; 2	ALA; 1	ALA; 2	IMS; 1	IMS; 2	IMS; 3	IRP	ROA; 1; 19	ROA; 2; 8	MOH; 1; 16	MOH; 2; 4	MOH; 3; 8	TOR; 1	TOR; 2	POR; 1; 2	POR; 2; 17	POR; 3; 18	18th	85
2023	Velocity Racing Development	STP; 1; 3	STP; 2; 1*	SEB; 1; 16	SEB; 2; 8	**IMS**; **1**; 3*	**IMS**; **2**; 3	IMS; 3; 2	IRP; 5	ROA; 1; 3	ROA; 2; 5	MOH; 1; 5	MOH; 2; 4	MOH; 3; 2	TOR; 1; 7*	TOR; 2; 18	POR; 1; 4	POR; 2; 3	POR; 3; 7	2nd	344

==== USF Pro 2000 Championship ====
(key) (Races in bold indicate pole position) (Races in italics indicate fastest lap) (Races with * indicate most race laps led)

Year	Team	1	2	3	4	5	6	7	8	9	10	11	12	13	14	15	16	17	18	Rank	Points
2023	Velocity Racing Development	STP; 1	STP; 2	SEB; 1	SEB; 2	IMS; 1	IMS; 2	IRP	ROA; 1	ROA; 2	MOH; 1	MOH; 2	TOR; 1	TOR; 2	COTA; 1; 3	COTA; 1; 1*	POR; 1; 14	POR; 2; 2	POR; 3; 1*	17th	118
2024	Velocity Racing Development	STP; 1; 4	STP; 2; 1	LOU; 1; 2	LOU; 2; 1	LOU; 3; 1*	IMS; 1; 1*	**IMS**; **2** DSQ	**IMS**; **3**; 2*	IRP; 17	ROA; 1; 7	ROA; 2; 13	ROA; 3; 6	**MOH**; **1**; 1*	MOH; 2; 1*	TOR; 1; 17	TOR; 2; 12	**POR**; **1**; 1*	**POR**; **2**; 1*	2nd	355

==== Indy NXT ====
(key) (Races in bold indicate pole position) (Races in italics indicate fastest lap) (Races with ^{L} indicate a race lap led) (Races with * indicate most race laps led)

Year	Team	1	2	3	4	5	6	7	8	9	10	11	12	13	14	15	16	17	Rank	Points
2025	HMD Motorsports	STP; 11	BAR	IMS; 20	IMS; 7	DET	GMP	RDA	MOH	IOW	LAG	LAG	POR	MIL	NSH				24th	55
2026	Cape Motorsports powered by ECR	STP; 1*	ARL; 6	BAR; 1	BAR; 3	IMS; 3	IMS; 6	DET; 6	GAT; 7	ROA; 6	ROA; 3	MOH; 7	MOH; 3	NSS; 2	POR; 8	MIL; 5	LAG; 2	LAG; 2	1st	585

==== IndyCar Series ====
(key)

Year	Team	No.	Chassis	Engine	1	2	3	4	5	6	7	8	9	10	11	12	13	14	15	16	17	Rank	Points	Ref
2027	Dale Coyne Racing	19	Dallara DW12	Honda	STP	PHX	ARL	ALA	LBH	IMS	INDY	DET	GTW	ROA	MOH	BCN	POR	MRK	MIL	MIL	LAG	-*	0*	

==== Indianapolis 500 ====
Year	Chassis	Engine	Start	Finish	Team
2027	Dallara	Honda			Dale Coyne Racing

* Season still in progress.

=== Complete GB3 Championship results ===
(key) (Races in bold indicate pole position) (Races in italics indicate fastest lap)

Year	Team	1	2	3	4	5	6	7	8	9	10	11	12	13	14	15	16	17	18	19	20	21	22	23	24	DC	Points
2024	VRD by Arden	OUL; 1	OUL; 2	OUL; 3	SIL1; 1	SIL1; 2	SIL1; 3	SPA; 1; 9	SPA; 2 Ret	SPA; 3 Ret	HUN; 1; 16	HUN; 2; 12	HUN; 3; 11^{8}	ZAN; 1; 9	ZAN; 2; 6	ZAN; 3; 1^{1}	SIL2; 1; 10	SIL2; 2; 14	SIL2; 3; 9^{4}	DON; 1; 14	DON; 2; 12	DON; 3; 11^{5}	BRH; 1; 6	BRH; 2; 9	BRH; 3; 1	11th	193
2025	Hitech TGR	SIL1; 1; 6	SIL1; 2; 3	SIL1; 3; 11	ZAN; 1; 19	ZAN; 2; 5	ZAN; 3; 6^{2}	SPA; 1 Ret	SPA; 2; 2	SPA; 3; 11	HUN; 1	HUN; 2	HUN; 3	SIL2; 1	SIL2; 2	SIL2; 3	BRH; 1; 14	BRH; 2; 18	BRH; 3; 10^{9}	DON; 1	DON; 2	DON; 3	MNZ; 1	MNZ; 2	MNZ; 3	16th	138

=== Complete Formula Regional Oceania Championship results ===
(key) (Races in bold indicate pole position) (Races in italics indicate fastest lap)

Year	Team	1	2	3	4	5	6	7	8	9	10	11	12	13	14	15	DC	Points
2025	M2 Competition	TAU; 1; 4	TAU; 2; 5	TAU; 3; 5	HMP; 1; 8	HMP; 2; 2	HMP; 3; 4	MAN; 1; 2	MAN; 2; 2	MAN; 3; 2	TER; 1; 3	TER; 2; 8	TER; 3; 5	HIG; 1; 8	HIG; 2; 1	HIG; 3; 8	3rd	305

=== Complete FIA Formula 3 Championship results ===
(key) (Races in bold indicate pole position) (Races in italics indicate fastest lap)

Year	Entrant	1	2	3	4	5	6	7	8	9	10	11	12	13	14	15	16	17	18	19	20	DC	Points
2025	DAMS Lucas Oil	MEL; SPR	MEL; FEA	BHR; SPR	BHR; FEA	IMO; SPR	IMO; FEA	MON; SPR	MON; FEA	CAT; SPR	CAT; FEA	RBR; SPR; 18	RBR; FEA; 22									32nd	0
2025	Hitech TGR													SIL; SPR; 27	SIL; FEA; 23	SPA; SPR	SPA; FEA	HUN; SPR; 23	HUN; FEA; 21	MNZ; SPR; 13	MNZ; FEA; 20	32nd	0

=== Complete IMSA SportsCar Championship results ===
(key) (Races in bold indicate pole position; races in italics indicate fastest lap)

Year	Entrant	Class	Chassis	Engine	1	2	3	4	5	6	7	8	9	10	Rank	Points
2026	RLL Team McLaren	GTD Pro	McLaren 720S GT3 Evo	McLaren M840T 4.0 L Turbo V8	DAY; 12	SEB; 9	LGA; 7	DET; 8	WGL; 11	MOS; 6	ELK; 12	VIR; 8	IMS; 8	PET; 14	9th	2392
