= Evagoras Papasavvas =

American racing driver (born 2007)

- Nationality: (United States) American (Cyprus) Cypriot via dual nationality
- Born: December 25, 2007 (age 18) Kirkland, Washington, U.S.

Indy NXT career
- Debut season: 2025
- Current team: Crosslink Motorsports
- Car number: 18, 24, 71
- Starts: 5
- Wins: 0
- Podiums: 1
- Poles: 0
- Fastest laps: 0

Previous series
- 2022–24: USF2000 Championship

Evagoras Papasavvas (born December 25, 2007) is an American-Cypriot racing driver who is currently competing in Formula Regional Americas Championship for Crosslink Motorsports. He most notably competed in Indy NXT for HMD Motorsports.

== Racing career ==
=== USF2000 ===
==== 2022 ====
On November 30, 2021, it was announced that Papasavvas would make his debut in single seaters in the 2022 U.S. F2000 National Championship driving for Jay Howard Driver Development. Due to an injury sustained racing karts, he had to miss the first half of the season. Papasavvas would make his debut at the ninth round held at Road America, but would retire during the race. He would finish 23rd in the standings.

==== 2023 ====
In late 2022, it was announced that Papasavvas would race in the 2023 USF2000 Championship once again with Jay Howard Driver Development. He would receive his maiden podium in the series at the first race held at St. Petersburg.

At Mid-Ohio, Papasavvas would qualify on pole by over two tenths of a second over championship leader Simon Sikes. However, since he missed the checkered flag and completed an extra lap before returning to the pit lane, he would receive a two-place grid penalty which resulted in a third place starting spot behind Sikes and Ethan Ho. Papasavvas managed to pass Ho into the first corner and got the lead from Sikes at turn four on lap one. On the last lap of the race, Sikes fought with Papasavvas for the lead out of turn four, however Sikes went wide into turn five which allowed Papasavvas to retake the lead into turn six. Papasavvas would hold on to grab his first win in the championship at his hometown track.

=== Indy NXT ===
==== 2025 ====
Papasavvas originally signed a deal with TJ Speed Motorsports to drive full-time in the 2025 USF Pro 2000 Championship, however, he instead backed out of the ride for a different opportunity. On February 24, 2025, it was announced that Papasavvas would join the 2025 Indy NXT driving the No. 18 for HMD Motorsports for a partial season. Papasavvas' debut would come earlier than expected, with the American filling the vacant No. 24 car for the second race at Barber following Sophia Flörsch's exit from the ride. He would have an impressive debut in the series, qualifying in third and finishing second behind race winner Dennis Hauger.

== Racing record ==
=== Career summary ===
Season	Series	Team	Races	Wins	Poles	F/Laps	Podiums	Points	Position
2022	USF2000 Championship	Jay Howard Driver Development	10	0	0	0	0	51	23rd
2023	USF2000 Championship	Jay Howard Driver Development	18	1	2	1	6	323	4th
2024	USF2000 Championship	Jay Howard Driver Development	18	2	2	1	8	326	4th
2025	Indy NXT	HMD Motorsports	5	0	0	0	1	117	21st
2026	Formula Regional Americas Championship	Crosslink Motorsports	20	5	4	8	11	241.5	**2nd**

* Season still in progress.

=== American open-wheel racing results ===
==== USF2000 Championship ====
(key) (Races in bold indicate pole position) (Races in italics indicate fastest lap) (Races with * indicate most race laps led)

Year	Team	1	2	3	4	5	6	7	8	9	10	11	12	13	14	15	16	17	18	Rank	Points
2022	Jay Howard Driver Development	STP; 1	STP; 2	ALA; 1	ALA; 2	IMS; 1	IMS; 2	IMS; 3	IRP	ROA; 1; 20	ROA; 2 DNS	MOH; 1; 19	MOH; 2; 15	MOH; 3; 15	TOR; 1; 16	TOR; 2; 11	POR; 1; 16	POR; 2; 14	POR; 3; 12	23rd	51
2023	Jay Howard Driver Development	STP; 1; 2	STP; 2; 4	SEB; 1; 3	SEB; 1; 10	IMS; 1; 19	IMS; 2; 7	IMS; 3; 6	IRP; 2	ROA; 1; 8	ROA; 2; 19	**MOH**; **1**; 1*	MOH; 2; 2	MOH; 3; 4	**TOR**; **1**; 6	TOR; 2; 7	POR; 1; 2	POR; 2; 5	POR; 3; 6	4th	323
2024	Jay Howard Driver Development	STP; 1; 2*	STP; 2; 3	NOL; 1; 2	NOL; 2; 2	NOL; 3; 2	IMS; 1; 4	IMS; 2; 19	IRP; 3	ROA; 1; 21	ROA; 2; 5	**MOH**; **1**; 8	**MOH**; **2**; 1*	MOH; 3; 14	TOR; 1; 12	TOR; 2; 1*	POR; 1; 6	POR; 2; 5	POR; 3; 15	4th	326

==== Indy NXT ====
(key) (Races in bold indicate pole position) (Races in italics indicate fastest lap) (Races with ^{L} indicate a race lap led) (Races with * indicate most race laps led)

Year	Team	1	2	3	4	5	6	7	8	9	10	11	12	13	14	Rank	Points
2025	HMD Motorsports	STP	BAR; 2	IMS; 10	IMS; 13	DET	GMP	RDA; 12	MOH; 9	IOW	LAG	LAG	POR	MIL	NSH	21st	117

* Season still in progress.
