= 2017 F2000 Championship Series =

The 2017 F2000 Championship Series season is the twelfth season of competition for the series.

== Race calendar and results ==
Round	Circuit	Location	Date	Pole position	Fastest lap	Winning driver
1	Virginia International Raceway	(United States) Alton, Virginia	April 29	(United States) Nick Palacio	(United States) Reece Everard	(United States) Nick Palacio
2	Virginia International Raceway	(United States) Alton, Virginia	April 30	(United States) Nick Palacio	(United States) Brandon Dixon	(United States) Brandon Dixon
3	Mid-Ohio Sports Car Course	(United States) Lexington, Ohio	May 12	(United States) John LaRue	(United States) John LaRue	(United States) John LaRue
4	Mid-Ohio Sports Car Course	(United States) Lexington, Ohio	May 13	(United States) Austin McCusker	(United States) Austin McCusker	(United States) Austin McCusker
5	Indianapolis Motor Speedway	(United States) Speedway, Indiana	June 10	(United States) Tim Minor	(United States) John LaRue	(United States) John LaRue
6	Indianapolis Motor Speedway	(United States) Speedway, Indiana	June 11	(United States) John LaRue	(United States) John LaRue	(United States) John LaRue
7	Mid-Ohio Sports Car Course	(United States) Lexington, Ohio	July 1	(United States) Kaylen Frederick	(United States) Oliver Askew	(United States) John McCusker
8	Mid-Ohio Sports Car Course	(United States) Lexington, Ohio	July 2	(United States) John LaRue	(United States) Oliver Askew	(United States) John LaRue
9	Pittsburgh International Race Complex	(United States) Wampum, Pennsylvania	July 29	(United States) Brandon Dixon	(United States) Brandon Dixon	(United States) Tim Minor
10	Pittsburgh International Race Complex	(United States) Wampum, Pennsylvania	July 30	(United States) Steve Jenks	(United States) Brandon Dixon	(United States) Brandon Dixon
11	Summit Point Motorsports Park	(United States) Summit Point, West Virginia	August 26			
12	Summit Point Motorsports Park	(United States) Summit Point, West Virginia	August 27			
13	New Jersey Motorsports Park	(United States) Millville, New Jersey	October 7			
14	New Jersey Motorsports Park	(United States) Millville, New Jersey	October 8			
