= 2020 Formula 4 United States Championship =

Motor racing competition

Seasons
- ← 2019 2021 →

The 2020 Formula 4 United States Championship season was the fifth season of the Formula 4 United States Championship, a motor racing series regulated according to FIA Formula 4 regulations and sanctioned by SCCA Pro Racing, the professional racing division of the Sports Car Club of America.

== Teams and drivers ==
All teams were American-registered.

Team	No.	Driver	Rounds
Alliance Racing Sponsored by Gas Monkey Energy Drink	03	(United States) Hayden Bowlsbey	All
Alliance Racing Sponsored by Gas Monkey Energy Drink	16	(United States) Ayrton Ori	1–2
Alliance Racing Sponsored by Gas Monkey Energy Drink	27	(United States) David Burketh	1–3
Alliance Racing Sponsored by Gas Monkey Energy Drink	28	(United States) Will Edwards	All
Alliance Racing Sponsored by Gas Monkey Energy Drink	33	(United States) David Dalton, Jr.	1, 3
Alliance Racing Sponsored by Gas Monkey Energy Drink	43	(United States) Will Holtz	All
Jensen Global Advisors	1	(United States) Alex Morton	1–4
Jensen Global Advisors	1	(United States) Mitch Regadas	1
Jensen Global Advisors	2	(United States) Jake Bonilla	All
Jensen Global Advisors	12	(Mexico) Gil Molina	1–3
Jay Howard Driver Development	3	(United States) Chase Hyland	1–3
Jay Howard Driver Development	4	(United States) Nick Persing	1–3
Jay Howard Driver Development	5	(United States) Sam Paley	1–3
Jay Howard Driver Development	6	(United States) Bijoy Garg	1–3
Jay Howard Driver Development	7	(United States) Christian Bogle	1–2
Jay Howard Driver Development	8	(United States) Nolan Siegel	1–2
Primus Racing	9	(United States) James Goughary, Jr.	1–3
Primus Racing	44	(United States) Aidan Yoder	1–2
Primus Racing	87	(United States) Jeremy Fairbairn	1–3
Velocity Racing Development	11	(United States) Hunter Yeany	1–5
Velocity Racing Development	21	(Barbados) Kyffin Simpson	1–3
Velocity Racing Development	29	(United States) Erik Evans	1–2, 4–6
Velocity Racing Development	99	(United States) Nick Persing	5–6
Crosslink/Kiwi Motorsport	13	(United States) Spike Kohlbecker	All
Crosslink/Kiwi Motorsport	14	(United States) Dylan Tavella	All
Crosslink/Kiwi Motorsport	19	(United States) Varun Choksey	All
Crosslink/Kiwi Motorsport	32	(Puerto Rico) José Blanco	All
Crosslink/Kiwi Motorsport	91	(New Zealand) Ronan Murphy	All
Crosslink/Kiwi Motorsport	93	(United States) Vincent Khristov	4
Crosslink/Kiwi Motorsport	93	(Sweden) Viktor Andersson	6
Group-A Racing	17	(United States) Robert Torres	All
Group-A Racing	24	(United States) Nicholas Rivers	All
Group-A Racing	62	(Jamaica) William Myers	All
DEForce Racing	22	(Canada) Nicholas Christodoulou	All
DEForce Racing	46	(United States) Davis Barringer	6
DEForce Racing	63	(Canada) Thomas Nepveu	5
DEForce Racing	84	(United States) Seth Aldretti	All
Iron Rock Motorsports	26	(United States) Cade McKee	All
RJay Racing	34	(United States) Race Liberante	4
DC Autosport	51	(United States) Josh Sarchet	All
DC Autosport	61	(United States) Jace Denmark-Gessel	2
DC Autosport	71	(Bolivia) Rodrigo Gutiérrez	4–6
New Gen Racing	87	(United States) Jeremy Fairbairn	4

== Race calendar ==
The original series schedule was announced on 19 December 2019. After multiple postponements due to the 2019-20 coronavirus pandemic, on 29 May 2020 a new schedule was revealed that added new rounds at Mid-Ohio Sports Car Course and Homestead-Miami Speedway, but no longer included a round at Road Atlanta. The final round at Circuit of the Americas, which was supposed to be held in support of the 2020 United States Grand Prix until that event canceled, was held as a triple-header.

Round		Circuit	Date	Pole position	Fastest lap	Winning driver	Winning team	Supporting
1	R1	Mid-Ohio Sports Car Course, Lexington	27 June	(United States) Christian Bogle	(United States) Nicholas Rivers	(United States) Hunter Yeany (Note: Race winner Christian Bogle was disqualified for having a non-compliant part on his car.)	Velocity Racing Development	Formula Regional Americas Championship; Trans-Am Series; SVRA
1	R2	Mid-Ohio Sports Car Course, Lexington	28 June		(Puerto Rico) José Blanco	(United States) Dylan Tavella (Note: Race winner Christian Bogle was disqualified for having a non-compliant part on his car.)	Crosslink/Kiwi Motorsport	Formula Regional Americas Championship; Trans-Am Series; SVRA
2	R1	Virginia International Raceway, Alton	18 July	(United States) Hunter Yeany	(United States) Dylan Tavella	(United States) Hunter Yeany	Velocity Racing Development	Formula Regional Americas Championship; Formula Race Promotions
2	R2	Virginia International Raceway, Alton	19 July		(United States) Hunter Yeany	(United States) Dylan Tavella	Crosslink/Kiwi Motorsport	Formula Regional Americas Championship; Formula Race Promotions
2	R3	Virginia International Raceway, Alton	19 July		(United States) Dylan Tavella	(United States) Hunter Yeany	Velocity Racing Development	Formula Regional Americas Championship; Formula Race Promotions
3	R1	Barber Motorsports Park, Birmingham	1 August	(United States) Dylan Tavella (Note: Qualifying was canceled due to severe weather. Grid for Race 1 based on points standings. Tavella was awarded pole position following a grid penalty to Hunter Yeany.)	(Canada) Nicholas Christodoulou	(United States) Hunter Yeany	Velocity Racing Development	Formula Regional Americas Championship; Radical Cup; Formula Race Promotions
3	R2	Barber Motorsports Park, Birmingham	1 August		(Puerto Rico) José Blanco	(Puerto Rico) José Blanco	Crosslink/Kiwi Motorsport	Formula Regional Americas Championship; Radical Cup; Formula Race Promotions
3	R3	Barber Motorsports Park, Birmingham	2 August		(United States) Hunter Yeany	(United States) Spike Kohlbecker	Crosslink/Kiwi Motorsport	Formula Regional Americas Championship; Radical Cup; Formula Race Promotions
3	R4	Barber Motorsports Park, Birmingham	2 August		(United States) Sam Paley	(United States) Hunter Yeany	Velocity Racing Development	Formula Regional Americas Championship; Radical Cup; Formula Race Promotions
4	R1	Sebring International Raceway, Sebring	26 September	(Puerto Rico) José Blanco	(Puerto Rico) José Blanco	(United States) Hunter Yeany	Velocity Racing Development	Formula Regional Americas Championship; ProtoAmerica
4	R2	Sebring International Raceway, Sebring	27 September		(United States) Hunter Yeany	(United States) Hunter Yeany	Velocity Racing Development	Formula Regional Americas Championship; ProtoAmerica
4	R3	Sebring International Raceway, Sebring	27 September		(United States) Hunter Yeany	(United States) Hunter Yeany	Velocity Racing Development	Formula Regional Americas Championship; ProtoAmerica
5	R1	Homestead-Miami Speedway, Homestead	3 October	(United States) Spike Kohlbecker	(Puerto Rico) José Blanco	(Puerto Rico) José Blanco	Crosslink/Kiwi Motorsport	Formula Regional Americas Championship
5	R2	Homestead-Miami Speedway, Homestead	4 October		(United States) Hunter Yeany	(Puerto Rico) José Blanco	Crosslink/Kiwi Motorsport	Formula Regional Americas Championship
5	R3	Homestead-Miami Speedway, Homestead	4 October		(United States) Hunter Yeany	(United States) Erik Evans (Note: Original race winner Hunter Yeany received a post-race penalty, awarding Evans the victory.)	Velocity Racing Development	Formula Regional Americas Championship
6	R1	Circuit of the Americas, Austin	24 October	(Puerto Rico) José Blanco	(Puerto Rico) José Blanco	(Puerto Rico) José Blanco	Crosslink/Kiwi Motorsport	Formula Regional Americas Championship; Radical Cup; Pro SRF3 Series
6	R2	Circuit of the Americas, Austin	25 October		(United States) Spike Kohlbecker	(United States) Spike Kohlbecker	Crosslink/Kiwi Motorsport	Formula Regional Americas Championship; Radical Cup; Pro SRF3 Series
6	R3	Circuit of the Americas, Austin	25 October		(United States) Spike Kohlbecker	(Puerto Rico) José Blanco	Crosslink/Kiwi Motorsport	Formula Regional Americas Championship; Radical Cup; Pro SRF3 Series

== Championship standings ==
Points were awarded as follows:

Position	**1st**	**2nd**	**3rd**	**4th**	**5th**	**6th**	**7th**	**8th**	**9th**	**10th**
Points	25	18	15	12	10	8	6	4	2	1

=== Drivers' standings ===
Pos	Driver	MOH (Note: Only 5 laps in Race 1 were completed, all under the safety car, due to a weather delay and on-track incidents. According to FIA regulations no points were awarded. Multiple drivers were disqualified for having non-compliant parts on their cars.)		VIR			BAR				SEB (Note: Jeremy Fairbairn was classified in 4th place in Race 3, but was stripped of his points after the race was completed due to an engine oil level infraction. He kept his 4th place finish while the drivers who finished behind him remained in the positions they were originally scored in.)			HMS			COA			Pts
1	(United States) Hunter Yeany	1	2	**1**	3	1	1	6	2	1	1	1	1	2	2	3				285
2	(Puerto Rico) José Blanco	3	3	Ret	4	3	26	1	11	3	**2**	17	5	1	1	2	**1**	12	1	228
3	(United States) Spike Kohlbecker	5	4	2	13	DNS	4	3	1	2	5	Ret	Ret	**4**	3	6	2	1	3	203
4	(United States) Dylan Tavella	23	1	18	1	2	**5**	4	6	5	Ret	2	2	3	5	7	6	18	2	201
5	(United States) Cade McKee	12	8	6	5	4	3	8	13	8	6	3	3	11	8	5	7	15	9	117
6	(United States) Erik Evans	10	5	10	17	DNS					3	4	Ret	7	4	1	8	3	10	101
7	(Canada) Nicholas Christodoulou	8	7	25	10	5	23	Ret	5	11	Ret	6	17	5	9	4	3	14	6	82
8	(United States) Nicholas Rivers	NC	21	5	2	19	6	7	4	21	Ret	7	16	Ret	Ret	11	5	9	Ret	72
9	(United States) Nick Persing	2	DSQ	4	9	Ret	8	DSQ	20	4				6	Ret	Ret	9	2	4	70
10	(United States) Josh Sarchet	Ret	20	3	NC	Ret	9	21	8	10	Ret	12	6	10	15	14	4	4	5	65
11	(United States) Sam Paley	4	DSQ	8	6	16	2	2	3	12										63
12	(United States) Varun Choksey	22	6	17	NC	13	7	9	9	9	9	11	15	15	Ret	DNS	11	6	11	30
13	(Jamaica) William Myers	17	16	7	NC	Ret	18	15	15	17	8	8	DNS	14	6	17	13	8	Ret	26
14	(United States) Jeremy Fairbairn	24	11	9	Ret	17	14	14	24	13	4	5	4							24
15	(United States) Bijoy Garg	DSQ	DSQ	14	12	Ret	24	5	7	7										22
16	(New Zealand) Ronan Murphy	11	Ret	24	15	15	12	10	19	14	Ret	9	8	17	Ret	8	14	19	7	17
17	(Bolivia) Rodrigo Gutiérrez										12	Ret	10	9	Ret	12	10	5	17	14
18	(Barbados) Kyffin Simpson	9	13	Ret	19	7	13	Ret	16	6										14
19	(United States) Jake Bonilla	Ret	Ret	13	11	12	11	12	14	15	Ret	Ret	14	19	7	9	17	7	12	14
20	(United States) Hayden Bowlsbey	18	9	15	Ret	Ret	17	11	17	19	7	Ret	Ret	12	12	10	12	Ret	DNS	9
21	(United States) Nolan Siegel	NC	DSQ	Ret	14	6														8
22	(United States) Will Holtz	15	10	Ret	8	14	22	16	18	18	13	13	9	13	14	18	15	10	15	8
23	(United States) Jace Denmark-Gessel			12	7	21														6
24	(United States) Race Liberante										16	Ret	7							6
25	(Mexico) Gil Molina	6	Ret	23	16	8	10	Ret	10	Ret										6
26	(Canada) Thomas Nepveu													8	11	Ret				4
27	(Sweden) Viktor Andersson																Ret	20†	8	4
28	(United States) Chase Hyland	Ret	DSQ	16	Ret	9	20	13	Ret	22										2
29	(United States) Vincent Khristov										10	10	Ret							2
30	(United States) Robert Torres	21	18	22	Ret	18	Ret	19	22	23	14	14	11	16	10	15	18	16	16	1
31	(United States) Aidan Yoder	Ret	12	19	NC	10														1
32	(United States) David Dalton, Jr.	7	15				15	Ret	Ret	DNS										0
33	(United States) Will Edwards	20	19	21	Ret	DNS	19	Ret	21	20	11	Ret	Ret	18	16	13	Ret	13	14	0
34	(United States) Davis Barringer																16	11	13	0
35	(United States) David Burketh	13	22	11	Ret	22	21	22	DNS	DNS										0
36	(United States) Ayrton Ori	14	14	Ret	18	11														0
37	(United States) Seth Aldretti	19	Ret	20	Ret	20	Ret	18	23	24	15	15	12	20	13	16	Ret	17	18	0
38	(United States) Alex Morton	WD	WD	Ret	DNS	DNS	16	17	12	16	DNS	16	13							0
39	(United States) James Goughary, Jr.	16	Ret	Ret	Ret	DNS	25	20	Ret	DNS										0
40	(United States) Mitch Regadas	Ret	17																	0
–	(United States) Christian Bogle	**DSQ**	DSQ	WD	WD	WD														0
Pos	Driver	MOH		VIR			BAR				SEB			HMS			COA			Pts

Colour	Result
Gold	Winner
Silver	Second place
Bronze	Third place
Green	Points classification
Blue	Non-points classification
Blue	Non-classified finish (NC)
Purple	Retired, not classified (Ret)
Red	Did not qualify (DNQ)
Red	Did not pre-qualify (DNPQ)
Black	Disqualified (DSQ)
White	Did not start (DNS)
White	Withdrew (WD)
White	Race cancelled (C)
Blank	Did not practice (DNP)
Blank	Did not arrive (DNA)
Blank	Excluded (EX)

**Bold** – Pole
Italics – Fastest Lap
† — Did not finish, but classified

=== Teams' standings ===
Pos	Team	Pts
1	Crosslink/Kiwi Motorsports	557
2	Velocity Racing Development	434
3	Jay Howard Driver Development	125
4	Iron Rock Motorsports	117
5	Group-A Racing	99
6	DEForce Racing	86
7	DC Autosports	85
8	New Gen Racing	22
9	Jensen Global Advisors	20
10	Alliance Racing w/ Gas Monkey	17
11	Rjay Racing	6
12	Primus Racing	3
