= Spike Kohlbecker =

American racing driver

- Nationality: (United States) American
- Born: Luke Kohlbecker; December 12, 2002 (age 23) Kirkwood, Missouri, U.S.

U.S. F2000 National Championship career
- Debut season: 2021
- Current team: Turn 3 Motorsport with Ignite Autosport
- Car number: 33
- Former teams: Ignite Autosport with Cape Motorsports
- Starts: 33
- Wins: 0
- Podiums: 1
- Poles: 0
- Fastest laps: 0
- Best finish: 7th in 2021

Previous series
- 2020 2020 2020 2019 2018-19 2018-19 2018: Toyota Racing Series; Formula 4 United States Championship; Formula Pro USA Championship; British Formula Ford Championship; New Zealand F1600 Championship; New Zealand Formula Ford Championship; Ontario Formula Ford Championship

Luke "Spike" Kohlbecker (born December 13, 2002) is an American racing driver. He last competed in the Toyota Gazoo Racing North America GR Cup with TechSport Racing. Kohlbecker previously competed in the U.S. F2000 National Championship with Turn 3 Motorsport with Ignite Autosport. Kohlbecker previously competed in the championship with Ignite Autosport with Cape Motorsports.

== Career ==
=== U.S. F2000 National Championship ===
In February 2021, Cape Motorsports forged an alliance with Ignite Autosport to field two full-time entries in the 2021 U.S. F2000 National Championship. Kohlbecker was signed as one of the drivers. Kohlbecker made his series debut at Barber Motorsports Park and scored a top-ten finish. At the first race at Road America, Kohlbecker scored a podium finishing third.

In 2022, Kohlbecker switched to Turn 3 Motorsports. His entry was also being co-run by Ignite Autosport once again.

== Racing record ==
=== Career summary ===
Season	Series	Team	Races	Wins	Poles	F/Laps	Podiums	Points	Position
2018	Ontario Formula Ford Championship	Brian Graham Racing	17	2	0	1	8	299	**3rd**
2018-19	New Zealand Formula Ford Championship	N/A	7	0	0	1	4	156	18th
2018-19	New Zealand F1600 Championship	N/A	11	0	0	1	4	277	7th
2019	British Formula Ford Championship	Cliff Dempsey Racing	23	4	1	2	11	478	**2nd**
2020	Formula Pro USA Championship	Kiwi Motorsport	2	2	0	2	2	54	6th
2020	Toyota Racing Series	Kiwi Motorsport	15	0	0	0	0	109	13th
2020	Formula 4 United States Championship	Crosslink/Kiwi Motorsport	17	2	1	2	8	203	**3rd**
2021	U.S. F2000 National Championship	Ignite Autosport with Cape Motorsports	18	0	0	0	1	235	7th
2022	U.S. F2000 National Championship	Turn 3 Motorsport with Ignite Autosport	18	0	0	0	0	200	10th
2023	Toyota GR Cup North America	TechSport Racing	13	2	0	1	6	191	**3rd**
2024	Toyota GR Cup North America	TechSport Racing	14	3	3	2	7	221	**2nd**
2025	Toyota GR Cup North America	RVA Graphics Motorsports by Speed Syndicate	14	2	0	3	5	155	**3rd**
2026	Toyota GR Cup North America	TechSport Racing	8	5	3	6	7	161	**1st***

* Season still in progress.

=== Complete Toyota Racing Series results ===
(key) (Races in bold indicate pole position) (Races in italics indicate fastest lap)

Year	Team	1	2	3	4	5	6	7	8	9	10	11	12	13	14	15	DC	Points
2020	Kiwi Motorsport	HIG; 1; 13	HIG; 2; 12	HIG; 3; 12	TER; 1; 17	TER; 2; 13	TER; 3; 13	HMP; 1; 14	HMP; 2; 15	HMP; 3 Ret	PUK; 1; 14	PUK; 2; 13	PUK; 3; 12	MAN; 1; 5	MAN; 2; 10	MAN; 3; 7	13th	109

=== American open-wheel racing results ===
==== U.S. F2000 National Championship ====
(key) (Races in bold indicate pole position) (Races in italics indicate fastest lap) (Races with * indicate most race laps led)

Year	Team	1	2	3	4	5	6	7	8	9	10	11	12	13	14	15	16	17	18	Rank	Points
2021	Ignite Autosport with Cape Motorsports	ALA; 1; 7	ALA; 2; 11	STP; 1; 6	STP; 2; 6	IMS; 1; 6	IMS; 2; 7	IMS; 3; 7	LOR; 11	ROA; 1; 3	ROA; 2; 8	MOH; 1; 14	MOH; 2; 11	MOH; 3; 10	NJMP; 1; 10	NJMP; 2; 7	NJMP; 3; 11	MOH; 4; 10	MOH; 5; 7	7th	235
2022	Turn 3 Motorsport with Ignite Autosport	STP; 1; 6	STP; 2; 12	ALA; 1; 10	ALA; 2; 11	IMS; 1; 6	IMS; 2; 6	IMS; 3; 10	IRP; 9	ROA; 1; 9	ROA; 2; 10	MOH; 1; 18	MOH; 2; 9	MOH; 3; 17	TOR; 1; 7	TOR; 2; 16	POR; 1; 13	POR; 2; 8	POR; 3; 7	10th	200

* Season still in progress.
