= Erik Evans =

American racing driver

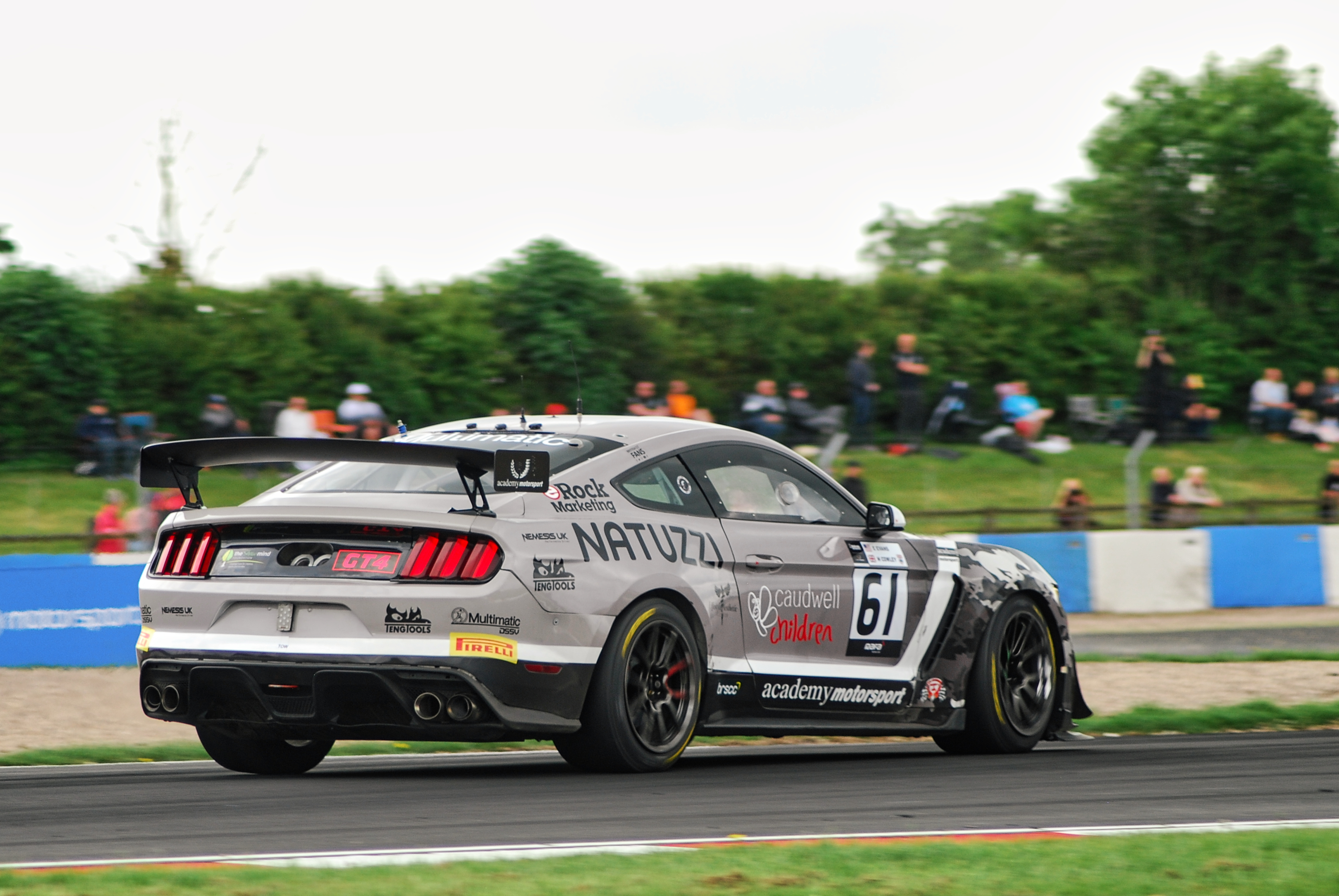
- Nationality: (United States) American
- Born: June 5, 2003 (age 23) Atlanta, Georgia, U.S.

GT4 European Series career
- Debut season: 2024
- Current team: Academy Motorsport
- Categorisation: FIA Silver
- Car number: 61
- Starts: 8 (8 entries)
- Wins: 0
- Podiums: 2
- Poles: 0
- Fastest laps: 01
- Best finish: TBD in 2024

Previous series
- 2021 2020–21: U.S. F2000 National; F4 US Championship

Championship titles
- 2023: British GT Championship - GT4

Erikson Reid Evans (born June 5, 2003) is an American racing driver. He competes in the GT4 European Series with Academy Motorsports as a Ford Racing development driver, having won the British GT Championship during his first full season in 2023. He previously completed in the U.S. F2000 National Championship with Velocity Racing Development.

== Racing record ==
=== Racing career summary ===
Season	Series	Team	Races	Wins	Poles	F/Laps	Podiums	Points	Position
2020	Formula 4 United States Championship	Velocity Racing Development	13	1	0	0	3	101	6th
2021	Formula 4 United States Championship	Velocity Racing Development	5	0	0	0	0	32	14th
2021	U.S. F2000 National Championship	Velocity Racing Development	12	0	0	0	0	54	22nd
2022	British GT Championship - GT4	Academy Motorsport	1	0	0	0	0	0	NC†
2023	British GT Championship - GT4	Academy Motorsport	9	2	0	0	4	145.5	**1st**
2023	GB4 Championship	Velocity Racing Development	2	0	0	0	0	22	22nd
2024	GT4 European Series - Silver	Academy Motorsport	12	0	0	1	2	74	8th
2024	British GT Championship - GT4	Academy Motorsport	9	0	0	0	0	72.5	6th
2025	GT4 European Series - Silver	Academy Motorsport							
2025	IMSA Ford Mustang Challenge	Academy Motorsport							
2026	GT4 European Series - Silver	Academy Motorsport							
2026	Michelin Pilot Challenge - GS	McCumbee McAleer Racing							

*Season still in progress.

=== Complete Formula 4 United States Championship results ===
(key) (Races in bold indicate pole position) (Races in italics indicate fastest lap)

Year	Team	1	2	3	4	5	6	7	8	9	10	11	12	13	14	15	16	17	18	Pos	Points
2020	Velocity Racing Development	MOH; 1; 10	MOH; 2; 5	VIR; 1; 10	VIR; 2; 17	VIR; 3 DNS	BAR; 1	BAR; 2	BAR; 3	BAR; 4	SEB; 1; 3	SEB; 2; 4	SEB; 3 Ret	HMS; 1; 7	HMS; 2; 4	HMS; 3; 1	COA; 1; 8	COA; 2; 3	COA; 3; 10	6th	101
2021	Velocity Racing Development	ATL; 1	ATL; 2	ATL; 3	ROA; 1	ROA; 2	ROA; 3	MOH; 1	MOH; 2	MOH; 3	BRA; 1	BRA; 2	BRA; 3	VIR; 1; 20	VIR; 2; 11	VIR; 3; 5	COA; 1; 5	COA; 2; 4		14th	32

=== American open–wheel racing results ===
==== Complete U.S. F2000 National Championship results ====
(key) (Races in bold indicate pole position) (Races in italics indicate fastest lap) (Races with * indicate most race laps led)

Year	Team	1	2	3	4	5	6	7	8	9	10	11	12	13	14	15	16	17	18	Rank	Points
2021	Velocity Racing Development	ALA; 15	ALA; 16	STP; 22	STP; 14	IMS; 16	IMS; 13	IMS; 10	LOR	ROA; 22	ROA; 25	MOH; 25	MOH; 21	MOH; 14	NJMP	NJMP	NJMP	MOH	MOH	22nd	54

=== Complete British GT Championship results ===
(key) (Races in bold indicate pole position) (Races in italics indicate fastest lap)

Year	Team	Car	Class	1	2	3	4	5	6	7	8	9	DC	Points
2022	Academy Motorsports	Ford Mustang GT4	GT4	OUL; 1	OUL; 2	SIL	DON	SNE; 1	SNE; 2	SPA	BRH	DON; 22	NC	0
2023	Academy Motorsports	Ford Mustang GT4	GT4	OUL; 1; 18	OUL; 2; 24	SIL; 21	DON; 18	SNE; 1 DSQ	SNE; 2 DSQ	ALG; 21	BRH; 13	DON; 15	1st	145.5
2024	Academy Motorsports	Ford Mustang GT4 (2024)	GT4	OUL; 1; 25	OUL; 2; 23	SIL; 1; 25	DON; 1; 31	SPA; 1; 15	SNE; 1 Ret	SNE; 2; 18	DON; 1; 17	BRA; 1; 23†	6th	72.5

*Season still in progress.

=== Complete GB4 Championship results ===
(key) (Races in bold indicate pole position) (Races in italics indicate fastest lap)

Year	Team	1	2	3	4	5	6	7	8	9	10	11	12	13	14	15	16	17	18	19	20	21	22	DC	Points
2023	Velocity Racing Development	OUL; 1	OUL; 2	OUL; 3	SIL1; 1	SIL1; 2	SIL1; 3	DON1; 1	DON1; 2	DON1; 3	DON1; 4	SNE; 1	SNE; 2	SNE; 3	SIL2; 1; 11	SIL2; 2; 9	SIL2; 3 C	BRH; 1	BRH; 2	BRH; 3	DON2; 1	DON2; 2	DON2; 3	22nd	22

=== Complete GT4 European Series results ===
(key) (Races in bold indicate pole position) (Races in italics indicate fastest lap)

Year	Team	Car	Class	1	2	3	4	5	6	7	8	9	10	11	12	Pos	Points
2024	Academy Motorsport	Ford Mustang GT4 (2024)	Silver	LEC; 1; 14	LEC; 2; 35	MIS; 1; 15	MIS; 2; 6	SPA; 1; 9	SPA; 2; 5	HOC; 1; 2	HOC; 2; 2	MNZ; 1; 9	MNZ; 2; 17	JED; 1; 8	JED; 2; 6	8th	74
2025	Academy Motorsport	Ford Mustang GT4 (2024)	Silver	LEC; 1; 1	LEC; 2; 8	ZAN; 1; 1	ZAN; 2; 5	SPA; 1 Ret	SPA; 2; 7	MIS; 1; 8	MIS; 2; 6	NÜR; 1 Ret	NÜR; 2; 3	CAT; 1 Ret	CAT; 2; 11	6th	97

* Season still in progress.
