= 2026 Michelin Pilot Challenge =

Motor racing competition

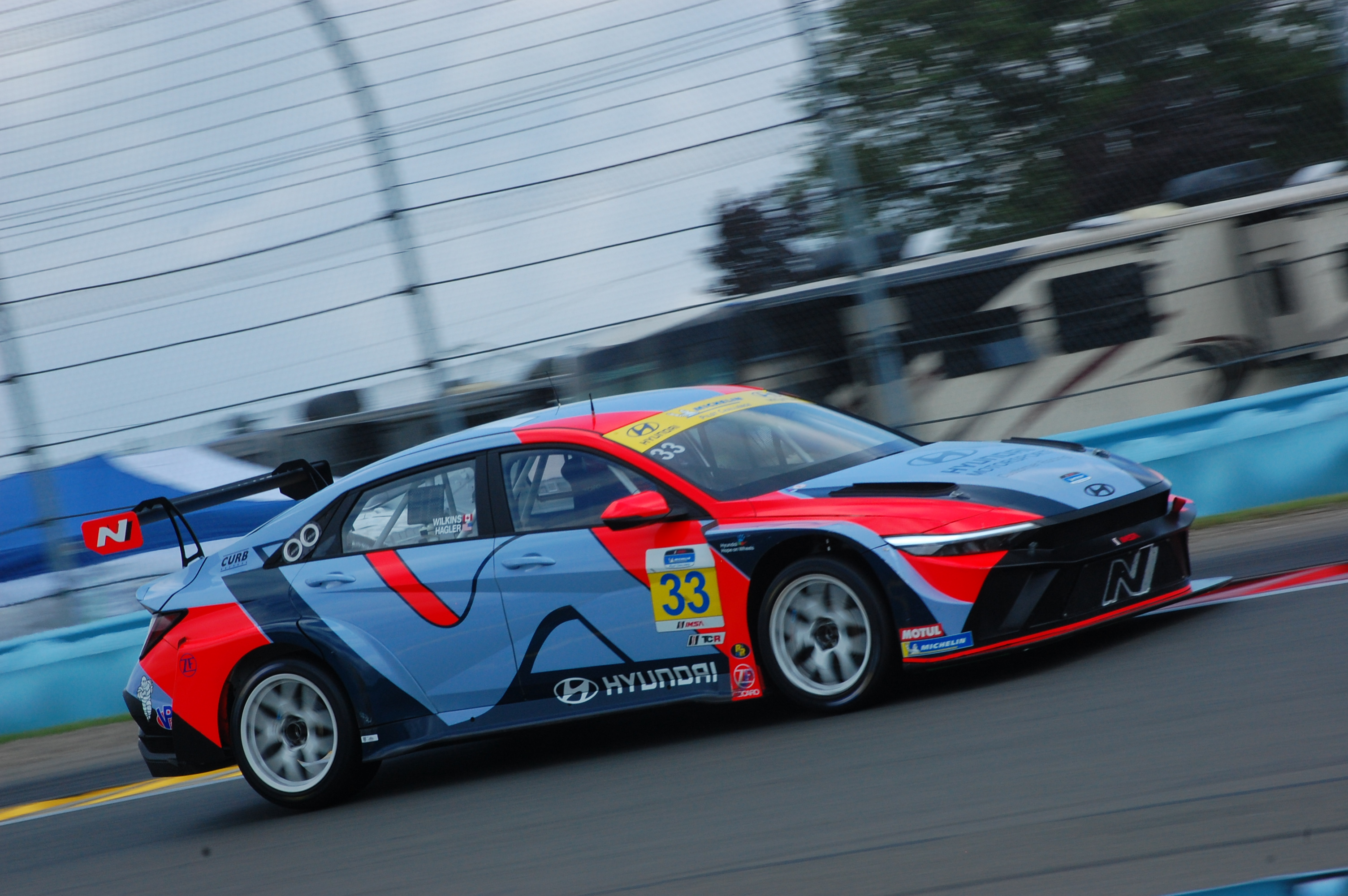
The No. 27 Auto Technic Racing won the GS Teams' Championship, with BMW winning the GS Manufacturers' Championship.
The No. 33 Bryan Herta Autosport with PR1/Mathiasen won the TCR Teams' Championship, with Hyundai winning the TCR Manufacturers' Championship.

The 2026 Michelin Pilot Challenge was the twenty-seventh season of the IMSA SportsCar Challenge and the thirteenth season organized by the International Motor Sports Association (IMSA). The season began on January 21 at Daytona International Speedway and finished on October 2 at Road Atlanta.

== Classes ==
- Grand Sport (GS)
- Touring Car (TCR)

== Calendar ==
The provisional 2026 calendar was released on March 13, 2025, featuring ten rounds.

Round	Race	Circuit	Location	Date	Duration
1	BMW M Endurance Challenge at Daytona	(United States) Daytona International Speedway	Daytona Beach, Florida	January 21–25	4 Hours
2	Alan Jay Automotive Network 120	(United States) Sebring International Raceway	Sebring, Florida	March 18–21	2 Hours
3	WeatherTech Raceway Laguna Seca 120	(United States) WeatherTech Raceway Laguna Seca	Monterey, California	May 1–3	2 Hours
4	O'Reilly Auto Parts 4 Hours of Mid-Ohio	(United States) Mid-Ohio Sports Car Course	Lexington, Ohio	June 5–7	4 Hours
5	LP Building Solutions 120 At The Glen	(United States) Watkins Glen International	Watkins Glen, New York	June 25–28	2 Hours
6	Canadian Tire Motorsport Park 120	(Canada) Canadian Tire Motorsport Park	Bowmanville, Ontario	July 10–12	2 Hours
7	Road America 120	(United States) Road America	Elkhart Lake, Wisconsin	July 30–August 2	2 Hours
8	Virginia Is For Racing Lovers Grand Prix	(United States) Virginia International Raceway	Alton, Virginia	August 20–23	2 Hours
9	Indianapolis Motor Speedway 120	(United States) Indianapolis Motor Speedway	Speedway, Indiana	September 18–20	2 Hours
10	Fox Factory 120	(United States) Michelin Raceway Road Atlanta	Braselton, Georgia	September 30–October 2	2 Hours

== Entry list ==
=== Grand Sport (GS) ===
Team	Car	Engine	No.	Drivers	Rounds
(United States) Czabok-Simpson Motorsport	Porsche 718 Cayman GT4 RS Clubsport 1–7; Aston Martin Vantage AMR GT4 Evo 8–10	Porsche MDG.GA 4.0 L Flat-6 1–7; Aston Martin M177 4.0 L Turbo V8 8–10	2	(United States) Morgan Burkhard	All
(United States) Czabok-Simpson Motorsport	Porsche 718 Cayman GT4 RS Clubsport 1–7; Aston Martin Vantage AMR GT4 Evo 8–10	Porsche MDG.GA 4.0 L Flat-6 1–7; Aston Martin M177 4.0 L Turbo V8 8–10	2	(United States) Gordon Scully	1–8
(United States) Czabok-Simpson Motorsport	Porsche 718 Cayman GT4 RS Clubsport 1–7; Aston Martin Vantage AMR GT4 Evo 8–10	Porsche MDG.GA 4.0 L Flat-6 1–7; Aston Martin M177 4.0 L Turbo V8 8–10	2	(United States) Zach Veach	9–10
(United States) Czabok-Simpson Motorsport	Porsche 718 Cayman GT4 RS Clubsport 1–7; Aston Martin Vantage AMR GT4 Evo 8–10	Porsche MDG.GA 4.0 L Flat-6 1–7; Aston Martin M177 4.0 L Turbo V8 8–10	2	(New Zealand) Madeline Stewart	1, 4
(United States) Czabok-Simpson Motorsport	Porsche 718 Cayman GT4 RS Clubsport 1–7; Aston Martin Vantage AMR GT4 Evo 8–10	Porsche MDG.GA 4.0 L Flat-6 1–7; Aston Martin M177 4.0 L Turbo V8 8–10	3	(New Zealand) Madeline Stewart	2–3, 5
(United States) Czabok-Simpson Motorsport	Porsche 718 Cayman GT4 RS Clubsport 1–7; Aston Martin Vantage AMR GT4 Evo 8–10	Porsche MDG.GA 4.0 L Flat-6 1–7; Aston Martin M177 4.0 L Turbo V8 8–10	3	(Republic of Ireland) Jonathan Browne	2–3, 5–6
(United States) Czabok-Simpson Motorsport	Porsche 718 Cayman GT4 RS Clubsport 1–7; Aston Martin Vantage AMR GT4 Evo 8–10	Porsche MDG.GA 4.0 L Flat-6 1–7; Aston Martin M177 4.0 L Turbo V8 8–10	3	(United States) Zach Veach	6
(United States) Czabok-Simpson Motorsport	Porsche 718 Cayman GT4 RS Clubsport 1–7; Aston Martin Vantage AMR GT4 Evo 8–10	Porsche MDG.GA 4.0 L Flat-6 1–7; Aston Martin M177 4.0 L Turbo V8 8–10	3	(United States) Ismaeel Ellahi	8–10
(United States) Czabok-Simpson Motorsport	Porsche 718 Cayman GT4 RS Clubsport 1–7; Aston Martin Vantage AMR GT4 Evo 8–10	Porsche MDG.GA 4.0 L Flat-6 1–7; Aston Martin M177 4.0 L Turbo V8 8–10	3	(United States) Ayrton Houk	8–10
(United States) Medusa Motorsports	Ford Mustang GT4 (S650)	Ford Coyote 5.0 L V8	4	(United States) Hunter Yeany	1–5, 7–10
(United States) Medusa Motorsports	Ford Mustang GT4 (S650)	Ford Coyote 5.0 L V8	4	(United States) Athan Sterling	1–5, 7, 9–10
(United States) Medusa Motorsports	Ford Mustang GT4 (S650)	Ford Coyote 5.0 L V8	4	(United States) Sam Corry	1
(United States) Medusa Motorsports	Ford Mustang GT4 (S650)	Ford Coyote 5.0 L V8	4	(United States) Jacob Loomis	4, 8
(United States) LAP Motorsports	Ford Mustang GT4 (S650)	Ford Coyote 5.0 L V8	6	(United States) Clayton Williams	7–10
(United States) LAP Motorsports	Ford Mustang GT4 (S650)	Ford Coyote 5.0 L V8	6	(United States) Scott Thomson	7–10
(United States) LAP Motorsports	Ford Mustang GT4 (S650)	Ford Coyote 5.0 L V8	30	(United States) Clayton Williams	1–6
(United States) LAP Motorsports	Ford Mustang GT4 (S650)	Ford Coyote 5.0 L V8	30	(United States) Scott Thomson	1–3, 6
(United States) LAP Motorsports	Ford Mustang GT4 (S650)	Ford Coyote 5.0 L V8	30	(United States) Casey Moyer	4
(United States) LAP Motorsports	Ford Mustang GT4 (S650)	Ford Coyote 5.0 L V8	30	(United States) Sandy Satullo	5
(Canada) VPX Motorsports	Porsche 718 Cayman GT4 RS Clubsport	Porsche MDG.GA 4.0 L Flat-6	7	(United States) Danny Dyszelski	1–2
(Canada) VPX Motorsports	Porsche 718 Cayman GT4 RS Clubsport	Porsche MDG.GA 4.0 L Flat-6	7	(Brazil) Matheus Leist	1–2
(United States) 89x Motorsport	Aston Martin Vantage AMR GT4	Aston Martin M177 4.0 L Turbo V8	8	(United States) Mike Fitzpatrick	1–2
(United States) 89x Motorsport	Aston Martin Vantage AMR GT4	Aston Martin M177 4.0 L Turbo V8	8	(United States) Johan Schwartz	1–2
(United States) van der Steur Racing	Aston Martin Vantage AMR GT4 Evo	Aston Martin M177 4.0 L Turbo V8	10	(United States) Ben Sloss	1, 3
(United States) van der Steur Racing	Aston Martin Vantage AMR GT4 Evo	Aston Martin M177 4.0 L Turbo V8	10	(United States) Christine Sloss	1, 3
(United States) van der Steur Racing	Aston Martin Vantage AMR GT4 Evo	Aston Martin M177 4.0 L Turbo V8	66	(United States) Trenton Estep	2–4
(United States) van der Steur Racing	Aston Martin Vantage AMR GT4 Evo	Aston Martin M177 4.0 L Turbo V8	66	(United States) Allen Patten	2–4
(United States) RaceWife Racing	Aston Martin Vantage AMR GT4 Evo	Aston Martin M177 4.0 L Turbo V8	10	(United States) Glenn McGee	9
(United States) RaceWife Racing	Aston Martin Vantage AMR GT4 Evo	Aston Martin M177 4.0 L Turbo V8	10	(United States) Christine Sloss	9
(United States) TGR RAFA Racing Team	Toyota GR Supra GT4 Evo2	BMW B58B30 3.0 L Turbo I6	12	(United States) Varun Choksey	All
(United States) TGR RAFA Racing Team	Toyota GR Supra GT4 Evo2	BMW B58B30 3.0 L Turbo I6	12	(Brazil) Kiko Porto	All
(United States) McCumbee McAleer Racing	Ford Mustang GT4 (S650)	Ford Coyote 5.0 L V8	13	(United States) Robert Noaker	All
(United States) McCumbee McAleer Racing	Ford Mustang GT4 (S650)	Ford Coyote 5.0 L V8	13	(United States) Nate Cicero	1–7
(United States) McCumbee McAleer Racing	Ford Mustang GT4 (S650)	Ford Coyote 5.0 L V8	13	(Germany) Finn Wiebelhaus	8–10
(United States) McCumbee McAleer Racing	Ford Mustang GT4 (S650)	Ford Coyote 5.0 L V8	61	(United States) Jenson Altzman	10
(United States) McCumbee McAleer Racing	Ford Mustang GT4 (S650)	Ford Coyote 5.0 L V8	61	(United States) Erik Evans	10
(United States) Circle H Racing	Aston Martin Vantage AMR GT4 Evo	Aston Martin M177 4.0 L Turbo V8	14	(United States) Thomas Merrill	All
(United States) Circle H Racing	Aston Martin Vantage AMR GT4 Evo	Aston Martin M177 4.0 L Turbo V8	14	(United States) David Hampton	1–9
(United States) Circle H Racing	Aston Martin Vantage AMR GT4 Evo	Aston Martin M177 4.0 L Turbo V8	14	(Armenia) Martin Sarukhanyan	1, 4, 10
(United States) Unitronic JDC-Miller MotorSports	Porsche 718 Cayman GT4 RS Clubsport	Porsche MDG.GA 4.0 L Flat-6	17	(United States) Chris Miller	All
(United States) Unitronic JDC-Miller MotorSports	Porsche 718 Cayman GT4 RS Clubsport	Porsche MDG.GA 4.0 L Flat-6	17	(South Africa) Mikey Taylor	All
(United States) Unitronic JDC-Miller MotorSports	Porsche 718 Cayman GT4 RS Clubsport	Porsche MDG.GA 4.0 L Flat-6	17	(United States) Nicholas Plocienik	1
(United States) Stephen Cameron Racing	Ford Mustang GT4 (S650)	Ford Coyote 5.0 L V8	19	(United States) Greg Liefooghe	All
(United States) Stephen Cameron Racing	Ford Mustang GT4 (S650)	Ford Coyote 5.0 L V8	19	(United States) Sean Quinlan	All
(Canada) Shopify Racing powered by TWOth	Porsche 718 Cayman GT4 RS Clubsport	Porsche MDG.GA 4.0 L Flat-6	22	(Canada) Trevor Hill	1–2, 6
(Canada) Shopify Racing powered by TWOth	Porsche 718 Cayman GT4 RS Clubsport	Porsche MDG.GA 4.0 L Flat-6	22	(Canada) Megan Tomlinson	1–2
(Canada) Shopify Racing powered by TWOth	Porsche 718 Cayman GT4 RS Clubsport	Porsche MDG.GA 4.0 L Flat-6	22	(Canada) Ron Tomlinson	2
(Canada) Shopify Racing powered by TWOth	Porsche 718 Cayman GT4 RS Clubsport	Porsche MDG.GA 4.0 L Flat-6	22	(Canada) Travis Hill	6
(United States) TGR Koch Copeland Motorsports	Toyota GR Supra GT4 Evo2	BMW B58B30 3.0 L Turbo I6	23	(United States) Jaxon Bell	All
(United States) TGR Koch Copeland Motorsports	Toyota GR Supra GT4 Evo2	BMW B58B30 3.0 L Turbo I6	23	(United States) Ford Koch	All
(United States) TGR Koch Copeland Motorsports	Toyota GR Supra GT4 Evo2	BMW B58B30 3.0 L Turbo I6	23	(United Kingdom) Jack Hawksworth	1
(United States) TGR Koch Copeland Motorsports	Toyota GR Supra GT4 Evo2	BMW B58B30 3.0 L Turbo I6	23	(United States) Jeremy Fletcher	4
(United States) P1 Motor Club x Murillo Racing	Mercedes-AMG GT4	Mercedes-AMG M178 4.0 L Turbo V8	24	(United States) Kenny Murillo	All
(United States) P1 Motor Club x Murillo Racing	Mercedes-AMG GT4	Mercedes-AMG M178 4.0 L Turbo V8	24	(United States) Aurora Straus	All
(United States) Auto Technic Racing	BMW M4 GT4 Evo (G82)	BMW S58B30T0 3.0 L Turbo I6	25	(United States) Tiger Tari	1
(United States) Auto Technic Racing	BMW M4 GT4 Evo (G82)	BMW S58B30T0 3.0 L Turbo I6	25	(United States) Christopher Tasca	1
(United States) Auto Technic Racing	BMW M4 GT4 Evo (G82)	BMW S58B30T0 3.0 L Turbo I6	27	(United States) Austin Krainz	All
(United States) Auto Technic Racing	BMW M4 GT4 Evo (G82)	BMW S58B30T0 3.0 L Turbo I6	27	(United Kingdom) Stevan McAleer	All
(United States) Auto Technic Racing	BMW M4 GT4 Evo (G82)	BMW S58B30T0 3.0 L Turbo I6	27	(United States) Roland Krainz	1
(United States) Heart of Racing Team	Aston Martin Vantage AMR GT4 Evo	Aston Martin M177 4.0 L Turbo V8	26	(United States) Hannah Grisham	All
(United States) Heart of Racing Team	Aston Martin Vantage AMR GT4 Evo	Aston Martin M177 4.0 L Turbo V8	26	(United States) Hannah Greenemeier	All
(United States) Heart of Racing Team	Aston Martin Vantage AMR GT4 Evo	Aston Martin M177 4.0 L Turbo V8	26	(Germany) Mike Ortmann	1
(United States) CarBahn with Peregrine Racing	BMW M4 GT4 Evo (G82)	BMW S58B30T0 3.0 L Turbo I6	37	(Australia) Cameron Shields	All
(United States) CarBahn with Peregrine Racing	BMW M4 GT4 Evo (G82)	BMW S58B30T0 3.0 L Turbo I6	37	(United States) Steve Wetterau	All
(United States) CarBahn with Peregrine Racing	BMW M4 GT4 Evo (G82)	BMW S58B30T0 3.0 L Turbo I6	39	(United States) Sean McAlister	1–7, 9–10
(United States) CarBahn with Peregrine Racing	BMW M4 GT4 Evo (G82)	BMW S58B30T0 3.0 L Turbo I6	39	(United States) Jeff Westphal	1–7, 9–10
(Canada) ST Racing by Random Vandals Racing	BMW M4 GT4 Evo (G82)	BMW S58B30T0 3.0 L Turbo I6	38	(United States) Bill Auberlen	All
(Canada) ST Racing by Random Vandals Racing	BMW M4 GT4 Evo (G82)	BMW S58B30T0 3.0 L Turbo I6	38	(Canada) Samantha Tan	All
(United States) Random Vandals Racing	BMW M4 GT4 Evo (G82)	BMW S58B30T0 3.0 L Turbo I6	92	(United States) Nicky Hays	All
(United States) Random Vandals Racing	BMW M4 GT4 Evo (G82)	BMW S58B30T0 3.0 L Turbo I6	92	(United States) Robert Megennis	1–9
(United States) Random Vandals Racing	BMW M4 GT4 Evo (G82)	BMW S58B30T0 3.0 L Turbo I6	92	(United States) Josh Green	10
(United States) Andretti Performance	Porsche 718 Cayman GT4 RS Clubsport	Porsche MDG.GA 4.0 L Flat-6	43	(United States) Jarett Andretti	3, 9
(United States) Andretti Performance	Porsche 718 Cayman GT4 RS Clubsport	Porsche MDG.GA 4.0 L Flat-6	43	(Colombia) Gabby Chaves	3, 9
(United States) Accelerating Performance	McLaren Artura GT4	McLaren M630 3.0 L Turbo V6	44	(United States) Michael Cooper	All
(United States) Accelerating Performance	McLaren Artura GT4	McLaren M630 3.0 L Turbo V6	44	(United States) Moisey Uretsky	All
(United States) Team TGM	Ford Mustang GT4 (S650)	Ford Coyote 5.0 L V8	46	(United States) Paul Holton	All
(United States) Team TGM	Ford Mustang GT4 (S650)	Ford Coyote 5.0 L V8	46	(United States) Matt Plumb	All
(United States) Team TGM	Ford Mustang GT4 (S650)	Ford Coyote 5.0 L V8	64	(United States) Ted Giovanis	All
(United States) Team TGM	Ford Mustang GT4 (S650)	Ford Coyote 5.0 L V8	64	(United States) Hugh Plumb	1–8, 10
(United States) Team TGM	Ford Mustang GT4 (S650)	Ford Coyote 5.0 L V8	64	(United States) Kris Wilson	4, 9
(United States) Kingpin Racing	Toyota GR Supra GT4 Evo2	BMW B58B30 3.0 L Turbo I6	53	(United States) Chad Carnevale	4
(United States) Kingpin Racing	Toyota GR Supra GT4 Evo2	BMW B58B30 3.0 L Turbo I6	53	(United States) Rob Walker	4
(United States) Kingpin Racing	Toyota GR Supra GT4 Evo2	BMW B58B30 3.0 L Turbo I6	53	(United States) Murray Wunderly	4
(United States) Kingpin Racing	Toyota GR Supra GT4 Evo2	BMW B58B30 3.0 L Turbo I6	53	(United States) Tyler Hoffman	8, 10
(United States) Kingpin Racing	Toyota GR Supra GT4 Evo2	BMW B58B30 3.0 L Turbo I6	53	(United States) Patrick Wilmot	8, 10
(Brazil) Panam Motorsport	Toyota GR Supra GT4 Evo2	BMW B58B30 3.0 L Turbo I6	54	(Brazil) Caio Chaves	All
(Brazil) Panam Motorsport	Toyota GR Supra GT4 Evo2	BMW B58B30 3.0 L Turbo I6	54	(Brazil) Thiago Camilo	1–2, 4, 6, 10
(Brazil) Panam Motorsport	Toyota GR Supra GT4 Evo2	BMW B58B30 3.0 L Turbo I6	54	(Brazil) Guilherme Salas	3, 5, 7–9
(United States) Winward Racing	Mercedes-AMG GT4	Mercedes-AMG M178 4.0 L Turbo V8	57	(United States) Bryce Ward	All
(United States) Winward Racing	Mercedes-AMG GT4	Mercedes-AMG M178 4.0 L Turbo V8	57	(Netherlands) "Daan Arrow"	1–4, 6–10
(United States) Winward Racing	Mercedes-AMG GT4	Mercedes-AMG M178 4.0 L Turbo V8	57	(Switzerland) Philip Ellis	5
(United States) KohR Motorsports	Ford Mustang GT4 (S650)	Ford Coyote 5.0 L V8	59	(United States) Billy Johnson	All
(United States) KohR Motorsports	Ford Mustang GT4 (S650)	Ford Coyote 5.0 L V8	59	(United States) Bob Michaelian	All
(United States) KohR Motorsports	Ford Mustang GT4 (S650)	Ford Coyote 5.0 L V8	60	(United States) Evan Slater	All
(United States) KohR Motorsports	Ford Mustang GT4 (S650)	Ford Coyote 5.0 L V8	60	(United States) Ray Mason	1–3
(United States) KohR Motorsports	Ford Mustang GT4 (S650)	Ford Coyote 5.0 L V8	60	(United States) Mike Skeen	4–10
(United States) Thunder Bunny Racing 1 (United States) Car Blanche 5–8 (United States) Oore 9–10	BMW M4 GT4 Evo (G82) 1 Aston Martin Vantage AMR GT4 Evo 5–10	BMW S58B30T0 3.0 L Turbo I6 1 Aston Martin M177 4.0 L Turbo V8 5–10	66	(United States) Trenton Estep	1, 5–10
(United States) Thunder Bunny Racing 1 (United States) Car Blanche 5–8 (United States) Oore 9–10	BMW M4 GT4 Evo (G82) 1 Aston Martin Vantage AMR GT4 Evo 5–10	BMW S58B30T0 3.0 L Turbo I6 1 Aston Martin M177 4.0 L Turbo V8 5–10	66	(United States) Allen Patten	1, 5–10
(United States) BSI Racing	Toyota GR Supra GT4 Evo2	BMW B58B30 3.0 L Turbo I6	67	(Australia) Harrison Goodman	All
(United States) BSI Racing	Toyota GR Supra GT4 Evo2	BMW B58B30 3.0 L Turbo I6	67	(United States) Lucas Weisenberg	All
(United States) Rebel Rock Racing	Aston Martin Vantage AMR GT4 Evo	Aston Martin M177 4.0 L Turbo V8	71	(United States) Frank DePew	1–2
(United States) Rebel Rock Racing	Aston Martin Vantage AMR GT4 Evo	Aston Martin M177 4.0 L Turbo V8	71	(United Kingdom) Robin Liddell	1–2
(United States) Rebel Rock Racing	Aston Martin Vantage AMR GT4 Evo	Aston Martin M177 4.0 L Turbo V8	71	(United States) Andrew Davis	1
(United States) BGB Motorsports	Porsche 718 Cayman GT4 RS Clubsport	Porsche MDG.GA 4.0 L Flat-6	83	(Canada) Thomas Collingwood	1–2, 4
(United States) BGB Motorsports	Porsche 718 Cayman GT4 RS Clubsport	Porsche MDG.GA 4.0 L Flat-6	83	(United States) Spencer Pumpelly	1–2, 4
(United States) BGB Motorsports	Porsche 718 Cayman GT4 RS Clubsport	Porsche MDG.GA 4.0 L Flat-6	83	(Belgium) Jan Heylen	1, 4
(United States) Vintage Racing Company	Porsche 718 Cayman GT4 RS Clubsport	Porsche MDG.GA 4.0 L Flat-6	91	(New Zealand) Dan Ammann	All
(United States) Vintage Racing Company	Porsche 718 Cayman GT4 RS Clubsport	Porsche MDG.GA 4.0 L Flat-6	91	(United States) Owen Trinkler	All
(United States) Vintage Racing Company	Porsche 718 Cayman GT4 RS Clubsport	Porsche MDG.GA 4.0 L Flat-6	91	(United States) Darren Law	1
(United States) Turner Motorsport	BMW M4 GT4 Evo (G82)	BMW S58B30T0 3.0 L Turbo I6	95	(United States) Dillon Machavern	All
(United States) Turner Motorsport	BMW M4 GT4 Evo (G82)	BMW S58B30T0 3.0 L Turbo I6	95	(United States) Luca Mars	All
(United States) Turner Motorsport	BMW M4 GT4 Evo (G82)	BMW S58B30T0 3.0 L Turbo I6	96	(United States) Vin Barletta	All
(United States) Turner Motorsport	BMW M4 GT4 Evo (G82)	BMW S58B30T0 3.0 L Turbo I6	96	(United States) Robby Foley	All

=== Touring Car (TCR) ===
Team	Car	No.	Drivers	Rounds
(United States) KMW Motorsports with TMR Engineering	Honda Civic Type R TCR (FL5)	5	(United States) Tim Lewis Jr.	All
(United States) KMW Motorsports with TMR Engineering	Honda Civic Type R TCR (FL5)	5	(United States) Rocco Pasquarella	All
(United States) Rockwell Autosport Development	Hyundai Elantra N TCR (2024)	15	(United States) Daniel Hanley	1–4
(United States) Rockwell Autosport Development	Hyundai Elantra N TCR (2024)	15	(United States) Doug Oakley	1–4
(United States) Rockwell Autosport Development	Hyundai Elantra N TCR (2024)	15	(Poland) Maciej Tobola	4
(United States) Bryan Herta Autosport with PR1/Mathiasen	Hyundai Elantra N TCR (2024)	18	(United States) Lance Bergstein	All
(United States) Bryan Herta Autosport with PR1/Mathiasen	Hyundai Elantra N TCR (2024)	18	(United States) Harry Gottsacker	All
(United States) Bryan Herta Autosport with PR1/Mathiasen	Hyundai Elantra N TCR (2024)	18	(United States) Jon Miller	1, 4
(United States) Bryan Herta Autosport with PR1/Mathiasen	Hyundai Elantra N TCR (2024)	33	(United States) Mason Filippi	All
(United States) Bryan Herta Autosport with PR1/Mathiasen	Hyundai Elantra N TCR (2024)	33	(United States) Bryson Morris	All
(United States) Bryan Herta Autosport with PR1/Mathiasen	Hyundai Elantra N TCR (2024)	33	(Australia) Josh Buchan	1
(United States) Bryan Herta Autosport with PR1/Mathiasen	Hyundai Elantra N TCR (2024)	76	(United States) Preston Brown	All
(United States) Bryan Herta Autosport with PR1/Mathiasen	Hyundai Elantra N TCR (2024)	76	(Belgium) Denis Dupont	All
(United States) Bryan Herta Autosport with PR1/Mathiasen	Hyundai Elantra N TCR (2024)	98	(United States) Maddie Aust	All
(United States) Bryan Herta Autosport with PR1/Mathiasen	Hyundai Elantra N TCR (2024)	98	(Canada) Mark Wilkins	All
(United States) Bryan Herta Autosport with PR1/Mathiasen	Hyundai Elantra N TCR (2024)	98	(United States) Andre Castro	1
(Puerto Rico) Victor Gonzalez Racing Team	Cupra León VZ TCR	21	(United States) Steven Clemons	1–4
(Puerto Rico) Victor Gonzalez Racing Team	Cupra León VZ TCR	21	(United States) William Tally	1–3, 5–10
(Puerto Rico) Victor Gonzalez Racing Team	Cupra León VZ TCR	21	(United States) Caleb Bacon	4–10
(Puerto Rico) Victor Gonzalez Racing Team	Cupra León VZ TCR	99	(Spain) Tyler Gonzalez (Note: Gonzalez is an American-Spanish driver competing under a Spanish licence.)	All
(Puerto Rico) Victor Gonzalez Racing Team	Cupra León VZ TCR	99	(Argentina) Franco Girolami	1–4
(Puerto Rico) Victor Gonzalez Racing Team	Cupra León VZ TCR	99	(Italy) Filippo Barberi	1
(Puerto Rico) Victor Gonzalez Racing Team	Cupra León VZ TCR	99	(United States) Steven Clemons	5–10
(United States) RVA Graphics by Speed Syndicate	Audi RS 3 LMS TCR (2021)	31	(United States) Luke Rumburg	1–2, 4, 7–8
(United States) RVA Graphics by Speed Syndicate	Audi RS 3 LMS TCR (2021)	31	(United States) Jaden Conwright	1–2, 4
(United States) RVA Graphics by Speed Syndicate	Audi RS 3 LMS TCR (2021)	31	(United States) Mark Brummond	1
(United States) RVA Graphics by Speed Syndicate	Audi RS 3 LMS TCR (2021)	31	(United States) Eric Rockwell	4
(United States) RVA Graphics by Speed Syndicate	Audi RS 3 LMS TCR (2021)	31	(United States) Don Yount	7–8
(Canada) Baker Racing	Audi RS 3 LMS TCR (2021)	52	(Canada) Sam Baker	All
(Canada) Baker Racing	Audi RS 3 LMS TCR (2021)	52	(Canada) James Vance	All
(Canada) Baker Racing	Audi RS 3 LMS TCR (2021)	56	(Canada) Dean Baker	All
(Canada) Baker Racing	Audi RS 3 LMS TCR (2021)	56	(Brazil) Bruno Junqueira	1–2, 5–6, 9–10
(Canada) Baker Racing	Audi RS 3 LMS TCR (2021)	56	(Canada) Kenny Riedmann	3–4, 7–8
(United States) Gou Racing	Cupra León VZ TCR 1 Audi RS 3 LMS TCR (2021) 2–7, 9	55	(United States) Eddie Gou	1–7, 9–10
(United States) Gou Racing	Cupra León VZ TCR 1 Audi RS 3 LMS TCR (2021) 2–7, 9	55	(United States) Eduardo Gou	1–6, 9–10
(United States) Gou Racing	Cupra León VZ TCR 1 Audi RS 3 LMS TCR (2021) 2–7, 9	55	(United States) Jon Morley	1
(United States) Gou Racing	Cupra León VZ TCR 1 Audi RS 3 LMS TCR (2021) 2–7, 9	55	(Brazil) Celso Neto	7
(Brazil) Stallion Motorsports	Cupra León VZ TCR	77	(Brazil) Celso Neto	1–6, 8–10
(Brazil) Stallion Motorsports	Cupra León VZ TCR	77	(Brazil) Raphael Reis	1–6
(Brazil) Stallion Motorsports	Cupra León VZ TCR	77	(United States) Eddie Gou	8
(Brazil) Stallion Motorsports	Cupra León VZ TCR	77	(United Kingdom) Jenson Brickley	9–10
(United States) Pegram Racing	Honda Civic Type R TCR (FL5)	72	(United States) Riley Pegram	All
(United States) Pegram Racing	Honda Civic Type R TCR (FL5)	72	(Germany) Mario Farnbacher	1, 4
(United States) Pegram Racing	Honda Civic Type R TCR (FL5)	72	(United States) Larry Pegram	2–10
(United States) HART	Honda Civic Type R TCR (FL5)	89	(United States) Tyler Chambers	1–5, 7, 10
(United States) HART	Honda Civic Type R TCR (FL5)	89	(United States) Chad Gilsinger	1–5, 7, 10
(United States) HART	Honda Civic Type R TCR (FL5)	89	(United States) Cameron Lawrence	1, 4
(Canada) Montreal Motorsport Group	Honda Civic Type R TCR (FL5)	93	(Canada) Louis-Philippe Montour	All
(Canada) Montreal Motorsport Group	Honda Civic Type R TCR (FL5)	93	(Canada) Karl Wittmer	All
(Canada) Montreal Motorsport Group	Honda Civic Type R TCR (FL5)	93	(Japan) Daijiro Yoshihara	1, 4

== Race results ==
Bold indicates overall winner.

Round	Circuit	GS Winning Team	TCR Winning Team
Round	Circuit	GS Winning Drivers	TCR Winning Drivers
1	Daytona	**(United States) #71 Rebel Rock Racing**	(United States) #76 Bryan Herta Autosport with PR1/Mathiasen
1	Daytona	**(United States) Andrew Davis** **(United States) Frank DePew** **(United Kingdom) Robin Liddell**	(United States) Preston Brown (Belgium) Denis Dupont
2	Sebring	**(United States) #44 Accelerating Performance**	(Puerto Rico) #99 Victor Gonzalez Racing Team
2	Sebring	**(United States) Michael Cooper** **(United States) Moisey Uretsky**	(Argentina) Franco Girolami (Spain) Tyler Gonzalez
3	Laguna Seca	**(United States) #95 Turner Motorsport**	(United States) #33 Bryan Herta Autosport with PR1/Mathiasen
3	Laguna Seca	**(United States) Dillon Machavern** **(United States) Luca Mars**	(United States) Mason Filippi (United States) Bryson Morris
4	Mid-Ohio	**(United States) #44 Accelerating Performance**	(Canada) #93 Montreal Motorsport Group
4	Mid-Ohio	**(United States) Michael Cooper** **(United States) Moisey Uretsky**	(Canada) Louis-Philippe Montour (Canada) Karl Wittmer (Japan) Daijiro Yoshihara
5	Watkins Glen	**(United States) #57 Winward Racing**	(United States) #5 KMW Motorsports with TMR Engineering
5	Watkins Glen	**(Switzerland) Philip Ellis** **(United States) Bryce Ward**	(United States) Tim Lewis Jr. (United States) Rocco Pasquarella
6	Mosport	**(United States) #12 TGR RAFA Racing Team**	(United States) #33 Bryan Herta Autosport with PR1/Mathiasen
6	Mosport	**(United States) Varun Choksey** **(Brazil) Kiko Porto**	(United States) Mason Filippi (United States) Bryson Morris
7	Road America	**(United States) #66 Car Blanche**	(United States) #76 Bryan Herta Autosport with PR1/Mathiasen
7	Road America	**(United States) Trenton Estep** **(United States) Allen Patten**	(United States) Preston Brown (Belgium) Denis Dupont
8	Virginia	**(United States) #19 Stephen Cameron Racing**	(Puerto Rico) #99 Victor Gonzalez Racing Team
8	Virginia	**(United States) Greg Liefooghe** **(United States) Sean Quinlan**	(United States) Steven Clemons (Spain) Tyler Gonzalez
9	Indianapolis	**(United States) #44 Accelerating Performance**	(Puerto Rico) #99 Victor Gonzalez Racing Team
9	Indianapolis	**(United States) Michael Cooper** **(United States) Moisey Uretsky**	(United States) Steven Clemons (Spain) Tyler Gonzalez
10	Road Atlanta	**(United States) #14 Circle H Racing**	(United States) #33 Bryan Herta Autosport with PR1/Mathiasen
10	Road Atlanta	**(United States) Thomas Merrill** **(Armenia) Martin Sarukhanyan**	(United States) Mason Filippi (United States) Bryson Morris

== Championship standings ==
=== Points system ===
Championship points are awarded in each class at the finish of each event. Points are awarded based on finishing positions in the race as shown in the chart below.

Position	1	2	3	4	5	6	7	8	9	10	11	12	13	14	15	16	17	18	19	20	21	22	23	24	25	26	27	28	29	30+
Race	350	320	300	280	260	250	240	230	220	210	200	190	180	170	160	150	140	130	120	110	100	90	80	70	60	50	40	30	20	10

=== Drivers' Championships ===
==== Standings: Grand Sport (GS) ====
Pos.	Drivers	DAY	SEB	LGA	MOH	WGL	MOS	ELK	VIR	IMS	ATL	Points	BDC
1	(United States) Austin Krainz (United Kingdom) Stevan McAleer	5	5	6	4	11	2	17	9	5	3	2490	-
2	(United States) Dillon Machavern (United States) Luca Mars	4	3	1	2	17	23	7	3	16	4	2440	-
3	(United States) Robert Noaker	**6**	8	**3**	10	2	3	11	21	7	13	2330	-
4	(United States) Hannah Grisham (United States) Hannah Greenemeier	11	17	7	12	**6**	**15**	**9**	8	**6**	6	2130	-
5	(United States) Michael Cooper (United States) Moisey Uretsky	18	1	9	1	4	6	19	29	1	27	2110	-
6	(United States) Bryce Ward	3	2	4	24	1	21	8	18	4	31	2070	-
7	(Brazil) Caio Chaves	23	4	10	13	7	8	3	5	20	21	1990	-
8	(United States) Morgan Burkhard	9	21	2	28	10	9	10	11	11	8	1940	-
9	(United States) Evan Slater	21	32	17	25	3	16	5	2	2	7	1900	-
10	(United States) Trenton Estep (United States) Allen Patten	16	14	12	9	5	4	1	22	31	20	1830	-
11	(United States) Nate Cicero	**6**	8	**3**	10	2	3	11				1810	-
12	(United States) Mike Skeen	21			25	3	16	5	2	2	7	1750	-
13	(Netherlands) Daan Arrow	3	2	4	24		21	8	18	4	31	1720	-
14	(United States) Varun Choksey (Brazil) Kiko Porto	34	**10**	22	6	13	1	28	7	17	18	1630	-
15	(United States) Nicky Hays	13	15	15	26	14	11	24	10	13	9	1600	-
16	(United States) Greg Liefooghe (United States) Sean Quinlan	8	7	15	11	28	19	26	1	14	26	1590	-
17	(United States) Vin Barletta (United States) Robby Foley	10	30	5	14	15	10	23	12	23	10	1580	-
18	(United States) Jaxon Bell (United States) Ford Koch	32	6	28	5	27	14	4	**4**	8	**29**	1570	-
19	(United States) Thomas Merrill	2	23	23	27	8	24	20	25	10	1	1550	-
20	(United States) Bill Auberlen (Canada) Samantha Tan	20	12	8	7	26	17	12	14	27	12	1550	-
21	(United States) Gordon Scully	9	21	2	28	10	9	10	11			1510	-
22	(Australia) Cameron Shields (United States) Steve Wetterau	27	26	18	15	9	26	6	15	12	5	1510	-
23	(United States) Paul Holton (United States) Matt Plumb	12	20	29	29	25	5	2	23	30	2	1390	-
24	(United States) Kenny Murillo (United States) Aurora Straus	14	25	19	8	19	22	14	16	21	14	1380	-
25	(United States) Robert Megennis	13	15	15	26	14	11	24	10	13		1380	-
26	(United States) Sean McAlister (United States) Jeff Westphal	30	24	13	**3**	18	7	25		3	24	1360	-
27	(United States) Chris Miller (South Africa) Mikey Taylor	28	18	14	23	29	13	15	17	9	15	1290	-
28	(Australia) Harrison Goodman (United States) Lucas Weisenberg	19	13	30	17	22	29	13	13	19	11	1240	-
29	(United States) David Hampton	2	23	23	27	8	24	20	25	10		1200	-
30	(United States) Billy Johnson (United States) Bob Michaelian	33	9	26	16	12	28	27	6	15	28	1130	-
31	(Brazil) Guilherme Salas			10		7		3	5	20		1120	-
32	(United States) Clayton Williams	15	19	24	19	16	27	18	19	29	22	930	-
33	(United States) Ted Giovanis	17	11	20	22	21	25	21	26	25	25	970	3260
34	(United States) Hugh Plumb	17	11	20	22	21	25	21	26		25	910	2960
35	(Brazil) Thiago Camilo	23	4		14		8				21	870	-
36	(New Zealand) Dan Ammann (United States) Owen Trinkler	31	31	27	20	20	12	16	27	24	17	870	3270
37	(United States) Scott Thomson	15	19	24			27	18	19	29	22	750	-
38	(Armenia) Martin Sarukhanyan	2			27						1	710	-
39	(United States) Hunter Yeany	22	31	25	30	24		22	24	18	23	610	-
40	(United States) Zach Veach						18			11	8	560	-
41	(United States) Athan Sterling	22	31	25	30	24		22		18	23	460	-
42	(Germany) Finn Wiebelhaus								21	7	13	520	-
43	(United States) Danny Dyszelski (Brazil) Matheus Leist	7	16									390	-
44	(United States) Frank DePew (United Kingdom) Robin Liddell	1	29									370	-
45	(New Zealand) Madeline Stewart	9	28	DNS	28	23						360	-
46	(United States) Andrew Davis	1										350	-
47	(Switzerland) Philip Ellis					1						350	-
48	(United States) Ismaeel Ellahi (United States) Ayrton Houk								20	26	16	310	-
49	(United States) Kris Wilson	17			22					26		290	950
50	(Canada) Trevor Hill	24	22				20					160	640
51	(United States) Roland Krainz	5										260	-
52	(United States) Jeremy Fletcher				5							260	-
53	(United States) Ray Mason	21	32	17								250	-
54	(Republic of Ireland) Jonathan Browne		28	DNS		23	18					110	-
55	(United States) Jarett Andretti (Colombia) Gabby Chaves			11						28		230	-
56	(Canada) Thomas Collingwood (United States) Spencer Pumpelly	25	27		18							230	-
57	(United States) Josh Green										9	220	-
58	(United States) Christine Sloss	29		21						22		210	970
59	(Germany) Mike Ortmann	11										200	-
60	(Belgium) Jan Heylen	25			18							190	-
61	(Canada) Ron Tomlinson	24	22									160	320
62	(United States) Sandy Satullo					16						150	-
63	(United States) Casey Moyer				19							120	-
64	(United States) Jenson Altzman (United States) Erik Evans										19	120	-
65	(United States) Ben Sloss	29		21								120	620
66	(Canada) Travis Hill						20					110	320
67	(United States) Chad Carnevale (United States) Rob Walker (United States) Murray Wunderly				21							100	320
68	(United States) Sam Corry	22										90	-
69	(United States) Glenn McGee									22		90	350
70	(United States) Jacob Loomis				30				24			80	-
71	(Canada) Megan Tomlinson	24										70	-
72	(United States) Mike Fitzpatrick (United States) Johan Schwartz (United States) Kevin Stadtlander	26										50	320
73	(United States) Tyler Hoffman (United States) Patrick Wilmot								28		30	40	-
74	(United States) Nicholas Plocienik	28										30	-
75	(United States) Darren Law	31										10	280
76	(United Kingdom) Jack Hawksworth	32										10	-
77	(United States) Tiger Tari (United States) Christopher Tasca	35										10	260
Pos.	Drivers	DAY	SEB	LGA	MOH	WGL	MOS	ELK	VIR	IMS	ATL	Points	BDC

Colour	Result
Gold	Winner
Silver	Second place
Bronze	Third place
Green	Points classification
Blue	Non-points classification
Blue	Non-classified finish (NC)
Purple	Retired, not classified (Ret)
Red	Did not qualify (DNQ)
Red	Did not pre-qualify (DNPQ)
Black	Disqualified (DSQ)
White	Did not start (DNS)
White	Withdrew (WD)
White	Race cancelled (C)
Blank	Did not practice (DNP)
Blank	Did not arrive (DNA)
Blank	Excluded (EX)

**Bold** - Pole position

Italics - Fastest lap

==== Standings: Touring Car (TCR) ====
Pos.	Drivers	DAY	SEB	LGA	MOH	WGL	MOS	ELK	VIR	IMS	ATL	Points
1	(United States) Mason Filippi (United States) Bryson Morris	3	3	**1**	8	2	1	3	**2**	5	1	3080
2	(United States) Preston Brown (Belgium) Denis Dupont	1	14	2	2	5	8	1	10	2	4	2810
3	(Canada) Louis-Philippe Montour (Canada) Karl Wittmer	12	7	3	1	**14**	**2**	**4**	4	3	**12**	2620
4	(United States) Tim Lewis Jr. (United States) Rocco Pasquarella	6	**5**	5	**11**	1	6	6	3	**11**	11	2520
5	(Spain) Tyler Gonzalez	10	1	7	14	11	10	14	1	1	10	2460
6	(United States) Maddie Aust (Canada) Mark Wilkins	4	4	6	3	6	9	10	12	9	7	2440
7	(United States) Eddie Gou	15	10	4	16	3	7	2	11	4	5	2400
8	(Canada) Dean Baker	13	9	9	9	12	3	9	5	7	3	2350
9	(United States) Lance Bergstein (United States) Harry Gottsacker	7	2	8	4	7	4	5	DNS	8	9	2300
10	(United States) Steven Clemons	14	15	14	6	11	10	14	1	1	10	2240
11	(Brazil) Celso Neto	**16**	8	11	5	8	12	2	11	12	14	2140
12	(United States) Riley Pegram	11	12	12	15	13	11	7	7	6	6	2100
13	(Canada) Sam Baker (Canada) James Vance	5	6	10	12	9	5	11	8	DNS	13	2000
14	(United States) Larry Pegram		12	12	15	13	11	7	7	6	6	1900
15	(United States) Eduardo Gou	15	10	4	16	3	7			4	5	1880
16	(United States) William Tally	14	15	14		10	13	12	6	10	2	1860
17	(United States) Caleb Bacon				6	10	13	12	6	10	2	1610
18	(United States) Tyler Chambers (United States) Chad Gilsinger	2	11		7	4		8			8	1500
19	(Canada) Kenny Riedmann	13		9	9			9	5		3	1110
20	(Brazil) Raphael Reis	**16**	8	11	5	8	12					1260
21	(Argentina) Franco Girolami	10	1	7	14							970
22	(United States) Luke Rumburg	8	16		13			13	9			960
23	(Brazil) Bruno Junqueira		9			12	3			7		950
24	(United States) Daniel Hanley (United States) Doug Oakley	9	13	13	10							790
25	(United States) Cameron Lawrence	2			7							560
26	(United States) Jaden Conwright	8	16		13							560
27	(Japan) Daijiro Yoshihara	12			1							540
28	(United States) Jon Miller	7			4							520
29	(United States) Don Yount							13	9			400
30	(Germany) Mario Farnbacher	11			15							360
31	(United Kingdom) Jenson Brickley									12	14	360
32	(Australia) Josh Buchan	3										300
33	(United States) Andre Castro	4										280
34	(United States) Mark Brummond	8										230
35	(United States) Alex Rockwell	9										220
36	(Italy) Filippo Barberi	10										210
37	(Poland) Maciej Tobola				10							210
38	(United States) Eric Rockwell				13							180
39	(United States) Jon Morley	15										160
Pos.	Drivers	DAY	SEB	LGA	MOH	WGL	MOS	ELK	VIR	IMS	ATL	Points

Colour	Result
Gold	Winner
Silver	Second place
Bronze	Third place
Green	Points classification
Blue	Non-points classification
Blue	Non-classified finish (NC)
Purple	Retired, not classified (Ret)
Red	Did not qualify (DNQ)
Red	Did not pre-qualify (DNPQ)
Black	Disqualified (DSQ)
White	Did not start (DNS)
White	Withdrew (WD)
White	Race cancelled (C)
Blank	Did not practice (DNP)
Blank	Did not arrive (DNA)
Blank	Excluded (EX)

**Bold** - Pole position

Italics - Fastest lap

=== Teams' Championships ===
==== Standings: Grand Sport (GS) ====
Pos.	Team	Car	DAY	SEB	LGA	MOH	WGL	MOS	ELK	VIR	IMS	ATL	Points
1	#27 Auto Technic Racing	BMW M4 GT4 Evo (G82)	5	5	6	4	11	2	17	9	5	3	2490
2	#95 Turner Motorsport	BMW M4 GT4 Evo (G82)	4	3	1	2	17	23	7	3	16	4	2440
3	#13 McCumbee McAleer Racing	Ford Mustang GT4	**6**	8	**3**	10	2	3	11	21	7	13	2330
4	#26 Heart of Racing Team	Aston Martin Vantage AMR GT4 Evo	11	17	7	12	**6**	**15**	**9**	8	**6**	6	2130
5	#44 Accelerating Performance	McLaren Artura GT4	18	1	9	1	4	6	19	29	1	27	2110
6	#57 Winward Racing	Mercedes-AMG GT4	3	2	4	24	1	21	8	18	4	31	2070
7	#54 Panam Motorsport	Toyota GR Supra GT4 Evo2	23	4	10	13	7	8	3	5	20	21	1990
8	#2 Czabok-Simpson Motorsport	Porsche 718 Cayman GT4 RS Clubsport 1–7; Aston Martin Vantage AMR GT4 Evo 8–10	9	21	2	28	10	9	8	11	11	8	1940
9	#60 KohR Motorsports	Ford Mustang GT4	21	32	17	25	3	16	5	2	2	7	1900
10	#66 Thunder Bunny Racing 1 #66 van der Steur Racing 2–4 #66 Car Blanche 5–8 #66 OORE 9–10	BMW M4 GT4 Evo (G82) 1 Aston Martin Vantage AMR GT4 Evo 2–10	16	14	12	9	5	4	1	22	31	20	1830
11	#12 TGR RAFA Racing Team	Toyota GR Supra GT4 Evo2	34	**10**	22	6	13	1	28	7	17	18	1630
12	#92 Random Vandals Racing	BMW M4 GT4 Evo (G82)	13	15	15	26	14	11	24	10	13	9	1600
13	#19 Stephen Cameron Racing	Ford Mustang GT4	8	7	16	11	28	19	26	1	14	26	1590
14	#96 Turner Motorsport	BMW M4 GT4 Evo (G82)	10	30	5	14	15	10	23	12	23	10	1580
15	#23 TGR Koch Copeland Motorsports	Toyota GR Supra GT4 Evo2	32	6	28	7	27	14	4	**4**	8	**29**	1570
16	#14 Circle H Racing	Aston Martin Vantage AMR GT4 Evo	2	22	23	27	8	24	20	25	10	1	1550
17	#38 ST Racing by Random Vandals Racing	BMW M4 GT4 Evo (G82)	20	12	8	7	26	17	12	14	27	22	1550
18	#37 CarBahn with Peregrine Racing	BMW M4 GT4 Evo (G82)	27	26	18	15	9	26	6	15	11	5	1510
19	#46 Team TGM	Ford Mustang GT4	12	20	29	29	25	5	2	23	30	2	1390
20	#24 Murillo Racing	Mercedes-AMG GT4	14	25	19	8	19	22	14	16	21	14	1380
21	#39 CarBahn with Peregrine Racing	BMW M4 GT4 Evo (G82)	30	24	13	**3**	18	7	25		3	24	1360
22	#17 Unitronic JDC-Miller MotorSports	Porsche 718 Cayman GT4 RS Clubsport	28	18	14	23	29	13	15	17	9	15	1290
23	#67 BSI Racing	Toyota GR Supra GT4 Evo2	19	13	30	17	22	29	11	13	19	11	1240
24	#59 KohR Motorsports	Ford Mustang GT4	33	9	26	16	11	28	27	6	15	28	1130
25	#64 Team TGM	Ford Mustang GT4	17	11	20	22	21	25	21	26	25	25	970
26	#91 Vintage Racing Company	Porsche 718 Cayman GT4 RS Clubsport	31	31	27	20	20	12	16	27	24	17	870
27	#30 LAP Motorsports	Ford Mustang GT4	15	19	24	19	16	27					660
28	#4 Medusa Motorsports	Ford Mustang GT4	22	31	25	30	24		22	24	18	23	610
29	#3 Czabok-Simpson Motorsport	Porsche 718 Cayman GT4 RS Clubsport 2–3, 5–6; Aston Martin Vantage AMR GT4 Evo 8–10		28	DNS		23	18		20	26	16	550
30	#7 VPX Motorsports	Porsche 718 Cayman GT4 RS Clubsport	7	16									390
31	#71 Rebel Rock Racing	Aston Martin Vantage AMR GT4 Evo	1	29									370
32	#6 LAP Motorsports	Ford Mustang GT4							18	19	29	22	360
33	#22 Shopify Racing powered by TWOth	Porsche 718 Cayman GT4 RS Clubsport	24	22				20					270
34	#43 Andretti Performance	Porsche 718 Cayman GT4 RS Clubsport			11						28		230
35	#83 BGB Motorsports	Porsche 718 Cayman GT4 RS Clubsport	25	27		18							230
36	#10 van der Steur Racing 1, 3 #10 RaceWife Racing 9	Aston Martin Vantage AMR GT4 Evo	29		21						22		210
37	#53 Kingpin Racing	Toyota GR Supra GT4 Evo2				21				28		30	140
38	#61 McCumbee McAleer Racing	Ford Mustang GT4										19	120
39	#8 89x Motorsport	Aston Martin Vantage AMR GT4 Evo	26										50
40	#25 Auto Technic Racing	BMW M4 GT4 Evo (G82)	35										10
Pos.	Team	Car	DAY	SEB	LGA	MOH	WGL	MOS	ELK	VIR	IMS	ATL	Points

==== Standings: Touring Car (TCR) ====
Pos.	Team	Car	DAY	SEB	LGA	MOH	WGL	MOS	ELK	VIR	IMS	ATL	Points
1	#33 Bryan Herta Autosport with PR1/Mathiasen	Hyundai Elantra N TCR (2024)	3	3	**1**	8	2	1	3	**2**	5	1	3080
2	#76 Bryan Herta Autosport with PR1 Mathiasen	Hyundai Elantra N TCR (2024)	1	14	2	2	5	8	1	10	2	4	2810
3	#93 Montreal Motorsport Group	Honda Civic Type R TCR (FL5)	12	7	3	1	**14**	**2**	**4**	4	3	**12**	2620
4	#5 KMW Motorsport with TMR Engineering	Honda Civic Type R TCR (FL5)	6	**5**	5	**11**	1	6	6	3	**11**	11	2520
5	#99 Victor Gonzalez Racing Team	Cupra León VZ TCR	10	1	7	14	11	10	14	1	1	10	2460
6	#98 Bryan Herta Autosport with PR1 Mathiasen	Hyundai Elantra N TCR (2024)	4	4	6	3	6	9	10	12	9	7	2440
7	#56 Baker Racing	Audi RS 3 LMS TCR (2021)	13	9	9	9	12	3	9	5	7	3	2350
8	#18 Bryan Herta Autosport with PR1/Mathiasen	Hyundai Elantra N TCR (2024)	7	2	8	4	7	4	5	DNS	8	9	2300
9	#55 Gou Racing	Cupra León VZ TCR 1 Audi RS 3 LMS TCR (2021) 2–10	15	10	4	16	3	7	2		4	5	2200
10	#21 Victor Gonzalez Racing Team	Cupra León VZ TCR	14	15	14	6	10	13	12	6	10	2	2110
11	#72 Pegram Racing	Honda Civic Type R TCR (FL5)	11	12	12	15	13	11	7	7	6	6	2100
12	#52 Baker Racing	Audi RS 3 LMS TCR (2021)	5	6	10	12	9	5	11	8	DNS	13	2000
13	#77 Stallion Motorsports	Cupra León VZ TCR	**16**	8	11	5	8	12		11	12	14	1820
14	#89 HART	Honda Civic Type R TCR (FL5)	2	11		7	4		8			8	1500
15	#31 RVA Graphics by Speed Syndicate	Audi RS 3 LMS TCR (2021)	8	16		13			13	9			960
16	#15 Rockwell Autosport Development	Hyundai Elantra N TCR (2024)	9	13	13	10							790
Pos.	Team	Car	DAY	SEB	LGA	MOH	WGL	MOS	ELK	VIR	IMS	ATL	Points

=== Manufacturers' Championships ===
==== Standings: Grand Sport (GS) ====
Pos.	Manufacturer	DAY	SEB	LGA	MOH	WGL	MOS	ELK	VIR	IMS	ATL	Points
1	(Germany) BMW	4	3	1	**2**	9	2	6	3	3	3	3040
2	(United States) Ford	**6**	7	**3**	10	2	3	2	1	2	2	3020
3	(United Kingdom) Aston Martin	1	14	7	9	**5**	**4**	**1**	8	**6**	1	2920
4	(Germany) Mercedes-AMG	3	2	4	8	1	21	8	16	4	14	2850
5	(United Kingdom) McLaren	18	1	9	1	4	6	19	29	1	27	2830
6	(Japan) Toyota	19	**4**	10	5	7	1	3	**4**	8	**11**	2800
7	(Germany) Porsche	7	16	2	18	10	9	10	17	9	15	2540
Pos.	Manufacturer	DAY	SEB	LGA	MOH	WGL	MOS	ELK	VIR	IMS	ATL	Points

==== Standings: Touring Car (TCR) ====
Pos.	Manufacturer	DAY	SEB	LGA	MOH	WGL	MOS	ELK	VIR	IMS	ATL	Points
1	(South Korea) Hyundai	1	2	**1**	2	2	1	1	**2**	2	1	3350
2	(Japan) Honda	2	**5**	3	**1**	**1**	**2**	**4**	3	**3**	**6**	3140
3	(Spain) Cupra	**10**	1	7	5	8	10	12	1	1	2	3070
4	(Germany) Audi	5	6	4	12	3	3	2	5	4	3	2940
Pos.	Manufacturer	DAY	SEB	LGA	MOH	WGL	MOS	ELK	VIR	IMS	ATL	Points
