= 2020 Formula Regional Americas Championship =

Motor racing competition

The 2020 Formula Regional Americas Championship powered by Honda was the third season for the FIA Formula 3 regional series across North America. The series was sanctioned by SCCA Pro Racing, the professional racing division of the Sports Car Club of America. The 2020 season was first season under the moniker of Formula Regional Americas, after a rebranding to align with the FIA single-seater development pathway. Linus Lundqvist won the championship, finishing 118 points in front of runner-up David Malukas, meanwhile Global Racing Group dominated the team's championship.

== Teams and drivers ==
Relentless Motorsports were the first Canadian-based team to compete in the series. All drivers competed with Honda-powered Ligier JS F3 cars on Hankook tires.

Team	No.	Driver	Status	Rounds
(United States) Crosslink Racing/Kiwi Motorsport	2	(Australia) Joshua Car	R	All
(Canada) Relentless Motorsports	4	(Canada) Mitch Egner	R	2
(Canada) Relentless Motorsports	93	(Canada) Andrew Dobbie	R	2–3
(United States) Global Racing Group	9	(Republic of Ireland) James Roe		All
(United States) Global Racing Group	22	(United States) Dario Cangialosi	R	All
(United States) Global Racing Group	24	(Denmark) Benjamin Pedersen		1–2
(United States) Global Racing Group	26	(Sweden) Linus Lundqvist	R	All
(United States) Global Racing Group	51	(United States) Nicky Hays	R	All
(United States) Jay Howard Driver Development	11	(Canada) Antonio Serravalle	R	1
(United States) Velocity Racing Development	11	(United States) Hunter Yeany	R G	6
(United States) Velocity Racing Development	14	(Colombia) Mathias Soler-Obel		1–2
(United States) Velocity Racing Development	27	(United Kingdom) Matt Round-Garrido		4
(United States) Abel Motorsports	15	(United States) Jacob Abel		All
(United States) Abel Motorsports	19	(United States) Blake Upton		1–3
(United States) Momentum Motorsports	16	(United States) Kent Vaccaro		1
(United States) Newman Wachs Racing	23	(Brazil) Victor Franzoni	R	All
(United States) Newman Wachs Racing	48	(United States) Jordan Missig	R	All
(United States) HMD Motorsports	39	(Canada) Marco Kacic		6
(United States) HMD Motorsports	55	(Uruguay) Santiago Urrutia	R	1
(United States) HMD Motorsports	59	(Cayman Islands) Kyffin Simpson	R	4–6
(United States) HMD Motorsports	79	(United States) David Malukas	R	All
(United States) HMD Motorsports	99	(Canada) Logan Cusson		3–6
(United States) Jensen Global Advisors	99	(Canada) Logan Cusson		1–2
(United States) Andretti Autosport	68	(Singapore) Danial Frost	R	1–4

Icon	Status
R	Rookie
G	Guest

== Race calendar ==
The series schedule was announced on 19 December 2019. However, after multiple postponements and cancellations due to the COVID-19 pandemic, a revised calendar was announced on 29 May 2020. This new calendar includes new rounds at Mid-Ohio Sports Car Course and Miami Speedway. The round at Circuit Trois-Rivières in Quebec, Canada - the planned first international event for the series - was not included in the reworked calendar. The round at Circuit of the Americas was held as a triple-header to finish out the season.

Round		Circuit	Date	Pole position	Fastest lap	Winning driver	Winning team	Supporting
1	R1	Mid-Ohio Sports Car Course, Lexington	27 June	(Sweden) Linus Lundqvist	(Sweden) Linus Lundqvist	(Sweden) Linus Lundqvist	(United States) Global Racing Group	Formula 4 United States Championship; Trans-Am Series; SVRA
1	R2	Mid-Ohio Sports Car Course, Lexington	28 June		(Sweden) Linus Lundqvist	(Sweden) Linus Lundqvist	(United States) Global Racing Group	Formula 4 United States Championship; Trans-Am Series; SVRA
2	R1	Virginia International Raceway, Alton	18 July	(Sweden) Linus Lundqvist	(Sweden) Linus Lundqvist	(Sweden) Linus Lundqvist	(United States) Global Racing Group	Formula 4 United States Championship; Formula Race Promotions
2	R2	Virginia International Raceway, Alton	19 July		(Sweden) Linus Lundqvist	(Sweden) Linus Lundqvist	(United States) Global Racing Group	Formula 4 United States Championship; Formula Race Promotions
2	R3	Virginia International Raceway, Alton	19 July		(Australia) Joshua Car	(Sweden) Linus Lundqvist	(United States) Global Racing Group	Formula 4 United States Championship; Formula Race Promotions
3	R1	Barber Motorsports Park, Birmingham	1 August	(Sweden) Linus Lundqvist	(Sweden) Linus Lundqvist	(Sweden) Linus Lundqvist	(United States) Global Racing Group	Formula 4 United States Championship; Radical Cup; Formula Race Promotions
3	R2	Barber Motorsports Park, Birmingham	2 August		(Sweden) Linus Lundqvist	(Sweden) Linus Lundqvist	(United States) Global Racing Group	Formula 4 United States Championship; Radical Cup; Formula Race Promotions
3	R3	Barber Motorsports Park, Birmingham	2 August		(Sweden) Linus Lundqvist	(Sweden) Linus Lundqvist	(United States) Global Racing Group	Formula 4 United States Championship; Radical Cup; Formula Race Promotions
4	R1	Sebring International Raceway, Sebring	26 September	(Sweden) Linus Lundqvist	(United States) David Malukas	(United States) David Malukas	(United States) HMD Motorsports	Formula 4 United States Championship; ProtoAmerica
4	R2	Sebring International Raceway, Sebring	27 September		(Sweden) Linus Lundqvist	(Sweden) Linus Lundqvist	(United States) Global Racing Group	Formula 4 United States Championship; ProtoAmerica
4	R3	Sebring International Raceway, Sebring	27 September		(Brazil) Victor Franzoni	(Sweden) Linus Lundqvist	(United States) Global Racing Group	Formula 4 United States Championship; ProtoAmerica
5	R1	Homestead-Miami Speedway, Homestead	3 October	(Sweden) Linus Lundqvist (Note: The qualifying session was canceled due to heavy rain. The Race 1 starting grid was set by point standings.)	(Sweden) Linus Lundqvist	(Sweden) Linus Lundqvist	(United States) Global Racing Group	Formula 4 United States Championship
5	R2	Homestead-Miami Speedway, Homestead	4 October		(Sweden) Linus Lundqvist	(Sweden) Linus Lundqvist	(United States) Global Racing Group	Formula 4 United States Championship
5	R3	Homestead-Miami Speedway, Homestead	4 October		(Sweden) Linus Lundqvist	(United States) David Malukas	(United States) HMD Motorsports	Formula 4 United States Championship
6	R1	Circuit of the Americas, Austin	24 October	(Sweden) Linus Lundqvist	(Sweden) Linus Lundqvist	(Sweden) Linus Lundqvist	(United States) Global Racing Group	Formula 4 United States Championship; Radical Cup; Pro SRF3 Series
6	R2	Circuit of the Americas, Austin	25 October		(Sweden) Linus Lundqvist	(Sweden) Linus Lundqvist	(United States) Global Racing Group	Formula 4 United States Championship; Radical Cup; Pro SRF3 Series
6	R3	Circuit of the Americas, Austin	25 October		(Sweden) Linus Lundqvist	(Sweden) Linus Lundqvist	(United States) Global Racing Group	Formula 4 United States Championship; Radical Cup; Pro SRF3 Series

== Championship standings ==
- Points are awarded as follows:

Position	**1st**	**2nd**	**3rd**	**4th**	**5th**	**6th**	**7th**	**8th**	**9th**	**10th**
Points	25	18	15	12	10	8	6	4	2	1

=== Drivers' standings ===
Pos	Driver	MOH		VIR			BAR			SEB			HMS			COA			Pts
Pos	Driver	R1	R2	R1	R2	R3	R1	R2	R3	R1	R2	R3	R1	R2	R3	R1	R2	R3	Pts
1	(Sweden) Linus Lundqvist	**1**	1	**1**	1	1	**1**	1	1	**6**	1	1	**1**	1	2	**1**	1	1	401
2	(United States) David Malukas	2	2	5	3	3	3	3	2	1	5	3	2	2	1	3	3	2	283
3	(Brazil) Victor Franzoni	3	8	4	6	4	2	4	4	3	2	2	3	11	3	2	2	3	225
4	(United States) Nicky Hays	9	7	10	4	7	4	2	3	11	6	7	4	4	6	5	7	8	142
5	(United States) Jacob Abel	6	6	6	9	Ret	7	5	Ret	5	3	5	7	5	8	4	4	5	133
6	(Australia) Joshua Car	14	5	2	2	2	5	6	10	4	Ret	Ret	11	9	Ret	6	9	Ret	109
7	(Republic of Ireland) James Roe	5	12	Ret	8	9	8	9	8	9	7	4	5	6	9	7	5	6	92
8	(Canada) Logan Cusson	DNS	14	8	13	Ret	13	12	12	10	4	8	6	3	4	Ret	13	7	64
9	(Singapore) Danial Frost	8	4	11	NC	5	9	7	5	2	Ret	DNS							62
10	(United States) Jordan Missig	7	13	3	14	8	6	11	6	NC	Ret	DNS	10	8	10	11	8	Ret	54
11	(United States) Dario Cangialosi	12	9	Ret	10	Ret	10	10	9	8	9	10	9	10	5	9	11	9	36
12	(Denmark) Benjamin Pedersen	4	Ret	Ret	5	6													30
13	(Cayman Islands) Kyffin Simpson									7	Ret	9	8	7	7	10	10	10	30
14	(United States) Blake Upton	13	15	7	15	10	11	8	7										17
15	(Uruguay) Santiago Urrutia	15†	3																15
16	(United Kingdom) Matthew Round-Garrido									NC	8	6							12
17	(Colombia) Mathias Soler-Obel	11	10	9	7	12													9
18	(Canada) Antonio Serravalle	10	16																1
19	(Canada) Marco Kacic															12	12	11	1
20	(Canada) Mitch Egner			Ret	11	11													0
21	(Canada) Andrew Dobbie			12	12	13	12	Ret	11										0
22	(United States) Kent Vaccaro	NC	11																0
Guest drivers ineligible to score points
—	(United States) Hunter Yeany															8	6	4	—
Pos	Driver	R1	R2	R1	R2	R3	R1	R2	R3	R1	R2	R3	R1	R2	R3	R1	R2	R3	Pts
Pos	Driver	MOH		VIR			BAR			SEB			HMS			COA			Pts

Colour	Result
Gold	Winner
Silver	Second place
Bronze	Third place
Green	Points classification
Blue	Non-points classification
Blue	Non-classified finish (NC)
Purple	Retired, not classified (Ret)
Red	Did not qualify (DNQ)
Red	Did not pre-qualify (DNPQ)
Black	Disqualified (DSQ)
White	Did not start (DNS)
White	Withdrew (WD)
White	Race cancelled (C)
Blank	Did not practice (DNP)
Blank	Did not arrive (DNA)
Blank	Excluded (EX)

**Bold** – Pole
Italics – Fastest Lap
† — Did not finish, but classified

=== Teams' Championship ===
Only a team's two best finishing cars are eligible for teams' championship points.

Pos	Team	MOH		VIR			BAR			SEB			HMS			COA			Pts
Pos	Team	R1	R2	R1	R2	R3	R1	R2	R3	R1	R2	R3	R1	R2	R3	R1	R2	R3	Pts
1	(United States) Global Racing Group	**1**	1	**1**	1	1	**1**	1	1	**6**	1	1	**1**	1	2	**1**	1	1	573
1	(United States) Global Racing Group	4	7	10	4	6	4	2	3	8	6	4	4	4	5	5	5	6	573
2	(United States) HMD Motorsports	2	2	5	3	3	3	3	2	1	4	3	2	2	1	3	3	2	367
2	(United States) HMD Motorsports	15†	3				13	12	12	7	5	8	6	3	4	10	10	7	367
3	(United States) Newman Wachs Racing	3	8	3	6	4	2	4	4	3	2	2	3	8	3	2	2	3	279
3	(United States) Newman Wachs Racing	7	13	4	14	8	6	11	6	NC	Ret	DNS	10	11	10	11	8	Ret	279
4	(United States) Abel Motorsports	6	6	6	9	Ret	7	5	7	5	3	5	7	5	8	4	4	5	150
4	(United States) Abel Motorsports	13	15	7	15	10	11	8	Ret										150
5	(United States) Crosslink/Kiwi Motorsport	14	5	2	2	2	5	6	10	4	Ret	Ret	11	9	Ret	6	9	Ret	109
6	(United States) Andretti Autosport	8	4	11	NC	5	9	7	5	2	Ret	DNS							62
7	(United States) Velocity Racing Development	11	10	9	7	12				NC	8	6				8	6	4	21
8	(United States) Jensen Global Advisors	DNS	14	8	13	Ret													4
9	(United States) Jay Howard Driver Development	10	16																1
10	(Canada) Relentless Motorsports			Ret	11	11	12	Ret	11										0
10	(Canada) Relentless Motorsports			12	12	13													0
11	(United States) Momentum Motorsports	NC	11																0
Pos	Team	R1	R2	R1	R2	R3	R1	R2	R3	R1	R2	R3	R1	R2	R3	R1	R2	R3	Pts
Pos	Team	MOH		VIR			BAR			SEB			HMS			COA			Pts
