= Velocity Racing Development =

American auto racing team

(United States) Velocity Racing Development
- Founded: 2019
- Founder(s): Dan Mitchell
- Base: Dawsonville, Georgia, United States
- Team principal(s): Dan Mitchell
- Current series: USF Pro 2000 Championship; GB3 Championship; USF2000 Championship; USF Juniors
- Former series: GB4 Championship; Formula 4 United States Championship; Formula Regional Americas Championship
- Current drivers: USF Pro 2000 Championship: (United States) 84. Frankie Mossman (United States) 88. Max Taylor; GB3 Championship: (Italy) 20. Nikita Bedrin (Mexico) 21. Patricio González (Mexico) 22. Rodrigo González; USF2000 Championship: (United States) 2. Thomas Schrage (United States) 19. Christian Cameron (United States) 25. Teddy Musella; USF Juniors: (Brazil) 10. João Vergara (Israel) 77. Matan Achituv (United States) 99. Ryan Giannetta
- Teams' Championships: USF Juniors: 2022, 2024; Formula 4 United States Championship: 2021
- Drivers' Championships: USF Juniors: 2024: Max Taylor; Formula 4 United States Championship: 2020: Hunter Yeany
- Website: https://vrd-racing.com/

Velocity Racing Development, also competing as VRD Racing in select championships, is an auto racing team from the United States. The team competes in the USF Pro Championships in the United States and the GB3 Championship in Europe, previously in collaboration with Arden Motorsport. The team is based in Dawsonville, Georgia near Atlanta Motorsports Park and was founded by British engineer Dan Mitchell.

== History ==
Velocity Racing Development was founded in 2019 by British engineer Dan Mitchell, following an engineering role with Team Benik and driver Kyle Kirkwood in 2018. VRD made its competitive debut in the 2019 F3 Americas Championship and the 2019 Formula 4 United States Championship. The team finished second in the F3 Americas teams' championship in its first year of competition.

In 2020, VRD driver Hunter Yeany won the Formula 4 United States Championship, marking the team's first drivers' title.

In 2021, VRD expanded its operation into the Road to Indy, entering into the 2021 Indy Pro 2000 Championship and the 2021 USF2000 Championship. At the end of year, the team would win the 2021 Formula 4 United States teams' championship, marking VRD's first championship.

VRD added another series to their program in the form of the 2022 USF Juniors, the inaugural season of the series. Drivers Sam Corry and Nikita Johnson would finish second and third in the drivers standings, while VRD won the teams' championship.

The following year saw continued expansion of VRD's operations with the team entering the 2023 GB3 Championship and the 2023 GB4 Championship. VRD entered a partnership with established British racing team Arden International to field cars in both championships. 2023 was a successful year for the team, finishing third in the USF2000, USF Juniors, and GB3 teams' championships.

In 2024, the team made the decision to leave the Formula Regional Americas and F4 United States championships. In the 2024 USF Juniors, VRD driver Max Taylor won the drivers' championship, marking the team's second drivers' title. VRD would also win the 2024 USF Juniors teams' championship.

In 2025, VRD elected to part ways with Arden International and enter the 2025 GB3 Championship on its own, under the name VRD Racing.

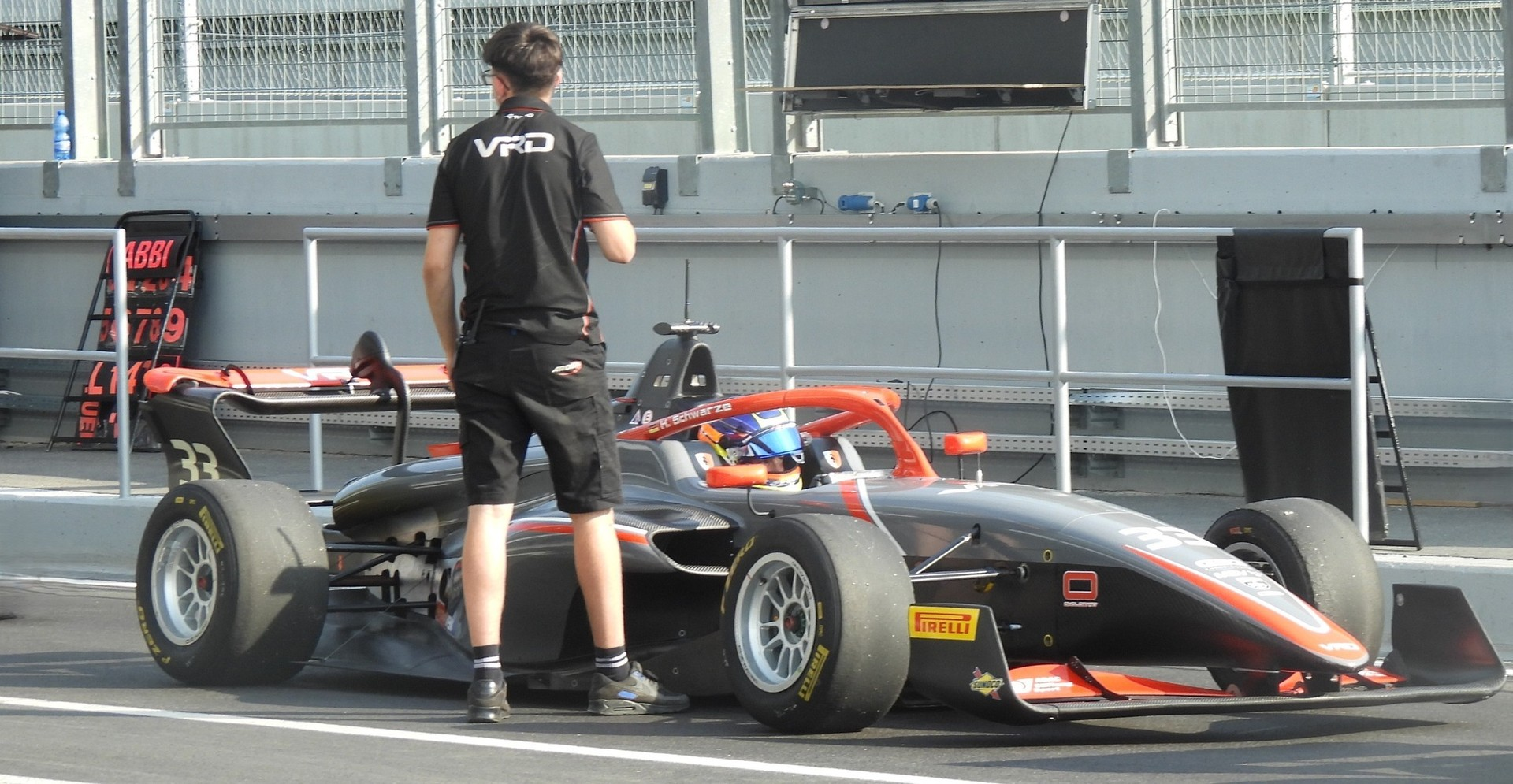
VRD Racing and driver Hugo Schwarze in the GB3 Championship

== Current series results ==
=== USF2000 Championship ===
Year	Car	Drivers	Races	Wins	Poles	F/Laps	Podiums	Points	D.C.	T.C.
2021	Tatuus USF-17	(United States) Erik Evans	12	0	0	0	0	54	22nd	12th
2022	Tatuus USF-22	(United Kingdom) Alex Quinn	3	3	0	2	3	93	17th	5th
2022	Tatuus USF-22	(United States) Nikita Johnson	8	0	0	1	1	85	18th	5th
2022	Tatuus USF-22	(Sweden) Viktor Andersson	12	0	0	0	0	81	19th	5th
2022	Tatuus USF-22	(United States) Nicholas d'Orlando†	10	0	0	1	0	77	20th	5th
2022	Tatuus USF-22	(United States) Ethan Ho	3	0	0	0	0	27	25th	5th
2023	Tatuus USF-22	(United States) Nikita Johnson	18	1	2	2	8	344	2nd	3rd
2023	Tatuus USF-22	(United States) Sam Corry	18	1	0	0	3	222	7th	3rd
2023	Tatuus USF-22	(United States) Danny Dyszelski	13	0	0	1	0	141	13th	3rd
2023	Tatuus USF-22	(United States) Gordon Scully	18	0	0	0	0	133	15th	3rd
2023	Tatuus USF-22	(United States) Max Taylor	11	0	0	0	0	86	18th	3rd
2023	Tatuus USF-22	(United States) Zack Ping	12	0	0	0	0	60	19th	3rd
2023	Tatuus USF-22	(Canada) Nico Christodoulou	2	1	0	1	1	48	21st	3rd
2024	Tatuus USF-22	(United States) Max Taylor	18	4	1	2	8	343	3rd	3rd
2024	Tatuus USF-22	(United States) Thomas Schrage‡	15	0	3	2	2	156	12th	3rd
2024	Tatuus USF-22	(Canada) Nico Christodoulou	7	1	0	1	1	92	19th	3rd
2024	Tatuus USF-22	(Australia) Xavier Kokai	10	0	0	0	0	80	20th	3rd
2024	Tatuus USF-22	(United States) Cole Kleck	5	0	0	0	0	19	25th	3rd
2025	Tatuus USF-22	(United States) Teddy Musella	18	2	2	2	9	371	2nd	1st
2025	Tatuus USF-22	(United States) Thomas Schrage	18	3	5	3	11	370	3rd	1st
2025	Tatuus USF-22	(United States) Christian Cameron	17	0	0	0	0	181	11th	1st
2025	Tatuus USF-22	(United States) Ryan Giannetta	16	0	0	0	0	98	18th	1st
2026	Tatuus USF-22	(United States) Oliver Wheldon	16	2	7	1	7	282	5th	3rd
2026	Tatuus USF-22	(Brazil) João Vergara	18	0	0	0	3	257	6th	3rd
2026	Tatuus USF-22	(United States) Ryan Giannetta	18	1	1	1	3	242	7th	3rd
2026	Tatuus USF-22	(United States) Jack Mohrhardt	18	0	0	0	0	118	15th	3rd
2026	Tatuus USF-22	(United States) Teddy Musella	2	0	0	0	0	22	27th	3rd
2026	Tatuus USF-22	(United States) Colin Aitken	2	0	0	0	0	21	28th	3rd

† D'Orlando drove for Exclusive Autosport from round 14 onwards.

‡ Schrage drove for Exclusive Autosport until round 7.

=== USF Pro 2000 Championship ===
Year	Car	Drivers	Races	Wins	Poles	F/Laps	Podiums	Points	D.C.	T.C.
2021	Tatuus PM-18	(United States) Hunter Yeany	8	0	0	0	0	79	14th	9th
2023	Tatuus IP-22	(United States) Nikita Johnson	5	2	0	2	4	118	17th	8th
2024	Tatuus IP-22	(United States) Nikita Johnson	18	8	7	8	10	355	2nd	3rd
2024	Tatuus IP-22	(Canada) Nico Christodoulou	5	0	0	0	0	48	23rd	3rd
2024	Tatuus IP-22	(United States) Shawn Rashid	4	0	0	0	0	19	27th	3rd
2024	Tatuus IP-22	(United States) Noah Ping	2	0	0	0	0	17	28th	3rd
2025	Tatuus IP-22	(United States) Max Taylor	18	1	0	0	4	268	6th	5th
2025	Tatuus IP-22	(United States) Frankie Mossman†	17	0	1	0	2	203	8th	5th
2025	Tatuus IP-22	(Vietnam) Owen Tangavelou‡	8	0	0	0	0	74	19th	5th
2026	Tatuus IP-22	(United States) Colin Aitken								
2026	Tatuus IP-22	(United States) Teddy Musella								
2026	Tatuus IP-22	(United States) Frankie Mossman								

† Mossman drove for Jay Howard Driver Development until round 5.

‡ Tangevelou drove for DEForce Racing from round 6 onwards.

=== USF Juniors ===
Year	Car	Drivers	Races	Wins	Poles	F/Laps	Podiums	Points	D.C.	T.C.
2022	Ligier JS F4	(United States) Sam Corry	16	3	3	2	11	369	2nd	1st
2022	Ligier JS F4	(United States) Nikita Johnson	16	3	2	5	10	352	3rd	1st
2022	Ligier JS F4	(United States) Alessandro de Tullio	15	5	0	5	9	314	4th	1st
2022	Ligier JS F4	(United States) Noah Ping	4	0	0	0	0	46	20th	1st
2023	Tatuus JR-23	(United States) Jimmie Lockhart	16	2	0	1	5	292	4th	3rd
2023	Tatuus JR-23	(United States) Max Taylor	16	1	0	2	3	236	6th	3rd
2023	Tatuus JR-23	(United States) Ethan Barker	16	0	0	0	0	228	7th	3rd
2023	Tatuus JR-23	(United States) Hudson Schwartz	13	0	1	1	3	208	8th	3rd
2024	Tatuus JR-23	(United States) Max Taylor	15	3	3	3	9	329	1st	1st
2024	Tatuus JR-23	(United States) Sebastian Wheldon	16	4	2	4	9	308	3rd	1st
2024	Tatuus JR-23	(United States) Christian Cameron	16	0	0	0	0	135	10th	1st
2024	Tatuus JR-23	(United States) Michael Suco	16	0	0	0	0	75	21st	1st
2025	Tatuus JR-23	(Brazil) João Vergara	16	2	2	1	6	292	3rd	2nd
2025	Tatuus JR-23	(United States) Oliver Wheldon	16	0	1	1	7	250	5th	2nd
2025	Tatuus JR-23	(Israel) Matan Achituv	16	0	0	0	0	109	14th	2nd
2025	Tatuus JR-23	(United States) Colin Aitken	6	0	0	0	0	53	21st	2nd
2026	Tatuus JR-23	(Spain) Iván Machado Perez								
2026	Tatuus JR-23	(France) Arthur Barbe								
2026	Tatuus JR-23	(Netherlands) Dean Hoogendoorn								
2026	Tatuus JR-23	(Canada) Edward Kennedy								

=== GB3 Championship ===
Year	Car	Drivers	Races	Wins	Poles	F/Laps	Podiums	Points	D.C.	T.C.
2023	Tatuus-Cosworth MSV-022	(United Kingdom) James Hedley	23	2	0	0	3	347	6th	3rd
2023	Tatuus-Cosworth MSV-022	(Canada) Nico Christodoulou	23	0	0	1	3	261	8th	3rd
2023	Tatuus-Cosworth MSV-022	(United States) Noah Ping	23	2	0	0	3	204	12th	3rd
2024	Tatuus-Cosworth MSV-022	(United States) Noah Ping	23	0	0	1	2	211	10th	5th
2024	Tatuus-Cosworth MSV-022	(United States) Nikita Johnson	18	2	0	1	2	193	11th	5th
2024	Tatuus-Cosworth MSV-022	(United Kingdom) James Hedley†	14	0	0	0	2	151	15th	5th
2024	Tatuus-Cosworth MSV-022	(United States) Shawn Rashid	23	0	0	0	1	125	17th	5th
2025	Tatuus-Cosworth MSV-025	(Germany) Hugo Schwarze	15	1	0	1	3	143	15th	8th
2025	Tatuus-Cosworth MSV-025	(Thailand) Enzo Tarnvanichkul	15	1	0	0	1	122	17th	8th
2025	Tatuus-Cosworth MSV-025	(Mexico) Patricio González	12	0	0	0	0	79	21st	8th
2025	Tatuus-Cosworth MSV-025	(Mexico) Rodrigo González‡	12	0	0	0	0	41	23rd	8th
2026	Tatuus-Cosworth MSV-2026	(Italy) Nikita Bedrin	23	8	7	10	15	533	1st	1st
2026	Tatuus-Cosworth MSV-2026	(Mexico) Patricio González	23	1	0	0	1	287	7th	1st
2026	Tatuus-Cosworth MSV-2026	(Mexico) Rodrigo González	23	0	0	0	1	152	13th	1st

† Hedley drove for Rodin Motorsport and Chris Dittmann Racing from round 4 onwards.

‡ Rodrigo González drove for Chris Dittmann Racing in round 5.

== Former series results ==
=== GB4 Championship ===
Year	Car	Drivers	Races	Wins	Poles	F/Laps	Podiums	Points	D.C.	T.C.
2023	Tatuus F4-T014	(United States) Zack Ping	8	0	0	0	0	74	16th	8th
2023	Tatuus F4-T014	(United States) Erik Evans	2	0	0	0	0	22	22nd	8th
2024	Tatuus F4-T014	(United States) Ava Dobson	6	0	0	0	0	40	17th	8th

=== Formula 4 United States Championship ===
Year	Car	Drivers	Races	Wins	Poles	F/Laps	Podiums	Points	D.C.	T.C.
2018	Ligier JS F4	(United Kingdom) Oliver Clarke	17	0	0	0	0	12	19th	10th
2018	Ligier JS F4	(United States) Sabré Cook	5	0	0	0	0	0	39th	10th
2019	Ligier JS F4	(Canada) Ryan MacDermid†	16	0	0	0	0	48	11th	6th
2019	Ligier JS F4	(United States) Michael d'Orlando	11	0	0	0	1	40	14th	6th
2019	Ligier JS F4	(United Kingdom) Oliver Clarke	6	0	0	0	0	11	20th	6th
2020	Ligier JS F4	(United States) Hunter Yeany	15	7	1	6	14	285	1st	2nd
2020	Ligier JS F4	(United States) Erik Evans	13	1	0	0	3	101	6th	2nd
2020	Ligier JS F4	(United States) Nick Persing†	15	0	0	0	1	70	9th	2nd
2020	Ligier JS F4	(Barbados) Kyffin Simpson	9	0	0	0	0	14	18th	2nd
2021	Ligier JS F4	(United States) Jason Alder	16	5	0	4	7	184	3rd	1st
2021	Ligier JS F4	(Canada) Nico Christodoulou	16	3	1	4	10	174.5	4th	1st
2021	Ligier JS F4	(United States) Hayden Bowlsbey†	17	0	0	0	1	40	11th	1st
2021	Ligier JS F4	(United States) Erik Evans	5	0	0	0	0	32	14th	1st
2021	Ligier JS F4	(United States) Nick Persing	3	0	0	0	0	0	NC	1st
2022	Ligier JS F4	(United States) Noah Ping	18	4	0	4	8	196	3rd	2nd
2022	Ligier JS F4	(United States) Matthew Christensen	15	2	1	2	4	129	6th	2nd
2022	Ligier JS F4	(United States) Nicholas Rivers	6	1	0	1	2	68	9th	2nd
2022	Ligier JS F4	(United States) Jacob Loomis	3	0	1	1	2	38	12th	2nd
2022	Ligier JS F4	(United States) Ethan Barker†	12	0	0	0	1	18	16th	2nd
2023	Ligier JS F4	(United States) Jimmie Lockhart	3	2	0	1	2	50	10th	7th
2023	Ligier JS F4	(United States) Max Taylor	3	0	0	0	0	4	25th	7th
2023	Ligier JS F4	(United States) Cole Kleck†	6	0	0	0	0	2	28th	7th

† Shared results with other teams

=== Formula Regional Americas Championship ===
Year	Car	Drivers	Races	Wins	Poles	F/Laps	Podiums	Points	D.C.	T.C.
2019	Ligier JS F3	(Colombia) Mathias Soler-Obel	16	1	1	2	6	161	3rd	2nd
2019	Ligier JS F3	(United States) Parker Locke	16	0	0	0	1	61	10th	2nd
2019	Ligier JS F3	(United States) Dominic Cicero	11	0	0	0	0	28	14th	2nd
2019	Ligier JS F3	(Canada) Antonio Serravalle	2	0	0	0	0	8	16th	2nd
2020	Ligier JS F3	(United Kingdom) Matt Round-Garrido	3	0	0	0	0	12	16th	7th
2020	Ligier JS F3	(Colombia) Mathias Soler-Obel	5	0	0	0	0	9	17th	7th
2020	Ligier JS F3	(United States) Hunter Yeany	3	0	0	0	0	0	NC	7th
2021	Ligier JS F3	(United States) Nick Persing	12	0	0	0	1	67	11th	4th
2021	Ligier JS F3	(United States) Hunter Yeany	12	0	1	0	0	67	12th	4th
2021	Ligier JS F3	(United States) Jason Alder	3	1	0	0	1	41	14th	4th
2021	Ligier JS F3	(United States) Arias Deukmedjian	3	0	0	0	0	13	18th	4th
2021	Ligier JS F3	(United Kingdom) Matt Round-Garrido	3	0	0	0	0	10	19th	4th
2022	Ligier JS F3	(Canada) Nico Christodoulou	6	0	0	0	0	44	9th	4th
2022	Ligier JS F3	(Bolivia) Rodrigo Gutiérrez	12	0	0	0	0	35	10th	4th
2023	Ligier JS F3	(United States) Cole Kleck†	6	0	0	0	1	51	10th	7th
2023	Ligier JS F3	(Bolivia) Rodrigo Gutiérrez	3	0	0	0	0	14	16th	7th

† Cleck drove for Speed Factory in round 6.

== Timeline ==
Current series
USF2000 Championship	2021–present
USF Pro 2000 Championship	2021, 2023–present
USF Juniors	2022–present
GB3 Championship	2023–present
Former series
GB4 Championship	2023–2024
Formula 4 United States Championship	2018–2023
Formula Regional Americas Championship	2019–2023
