= Hunter Yeany =

American racing driver (born 2005)

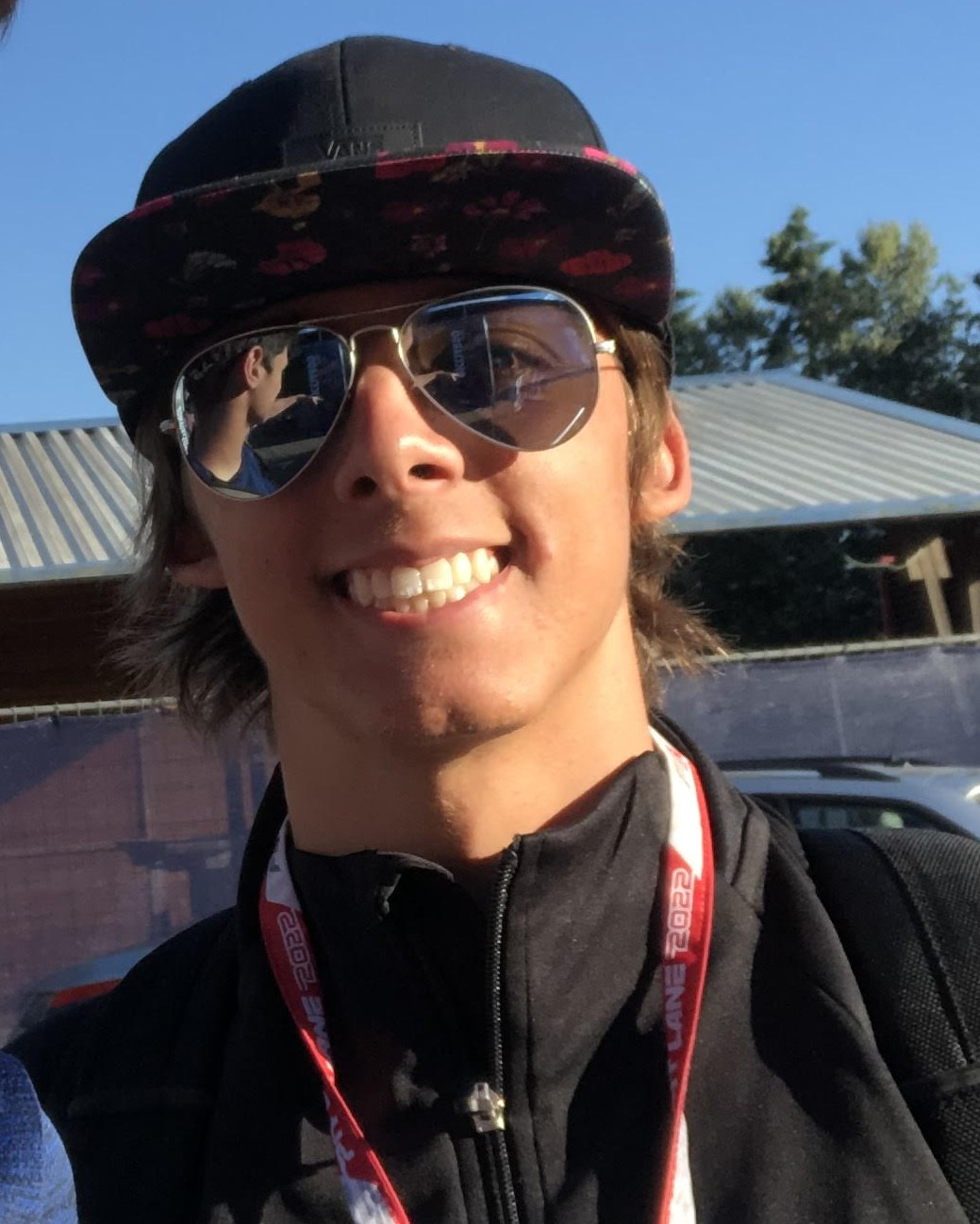
- Yeany in 2022
- Nationality: (United States) American
- Born: 11 May 2005 (age 21) Charlottesville, Virginia, U.S.

USF Pro 2000 Championship career
- Debut season: 2021
- Current team: TJ Speed Motorsports
- Car number: 27
- Former teams: Velocity Racing Development
- Starts: 16
- Wins: 1
- Podiums: 3
- Poles: 1
- Fastest laps: 0
- Best finish: 14th in 2021 & 2024

Previous series
- 2021–2023 2021 2020 2020: USF Pro 2000; FIA Formula 3 GB3; FR Americas; F4 United States

Championship titles
- 2020: Formula 4 United States Championship

Hunter Yeany (born 11 May 2005) is an American racing driver currently competing in the 2026 Michelin Pilot Challenge for Medusa Motorsports in a Ford Mustang GT4. Previously, he raced in the FIA Formula 3 Championship, the 2024 USF Pro 2000 Championship with TJ Speed Motorsports, and in Formula Regional Americas. He was the 2020 Formula 4 United States champion.

== Career ==
=== Karting ===
Yeany's karting career was predominantly in the US: finishing 13th in the 2019 SKUSA SuperNationals XX11 - KA100 Junior Class by RLV. Aside from that, not much is known about his karting career.

=== Formula 4 ===
In 2020, Yeany made his single seater debut in the Formula 4 US Championship with Velocity Racing Development, alongside Kyffin Simpson and Erik Evans. He dominated the championship, taking seven wins and 14 podiums from 15 races on his way to becoming the youngest ever winner of a Formula 4 series. His early clinching of the title led to him skipping the final round at COTA. Overall, he finished 58 points ahead of second in the standings.

=== Formula Regional Americas Championship ===
==== 2020 ====
Yeany made his debut in the Formula Regional Americas Championship in the final round of the 2020 season, continuing with Velocity Racing Development. The American finished all three races in the top ten, but was unable to score points due to his status as a guest driver.

==== 2021 ====
For 2021, Yeany raced in the series full time with the same team. He was unable to replicate his victory-laden season unlike the previous year, and missed the final two rounds due to family issues. He wounded 12th in the drivers' standings.

=== GB3 Championship ===
For the fourth round of the 2021 GB3 Championship Yeany joined Fortec Motorsports, partnering Roberto Faria and Mikkel Grundtvig. The American scored eighth and 15th-placed finishes in the first two races respectively, and achieved his first podium on a European racetrack with third place in the reversed grid race on Sunday. That allowed him to end 24th in the standings with 36 points.

=== FIA Formula 3 Championship ===
==== 2021 ====
In August 2021, Yeany was announced to join the FIA Formula 3 Championship at the Spa-Francorchamps round, replacing Formula 2-bound Enzo Fittipaldi at Charouz Racing System. He achieved a best race result of eighteenth place over two rounds. He missed the final round due to clashing commitments with the Formula Regional Americas Championship and was replaced by Ayrton Simmons. He ended 33rd in the full standings classification.

==== 2022 ====
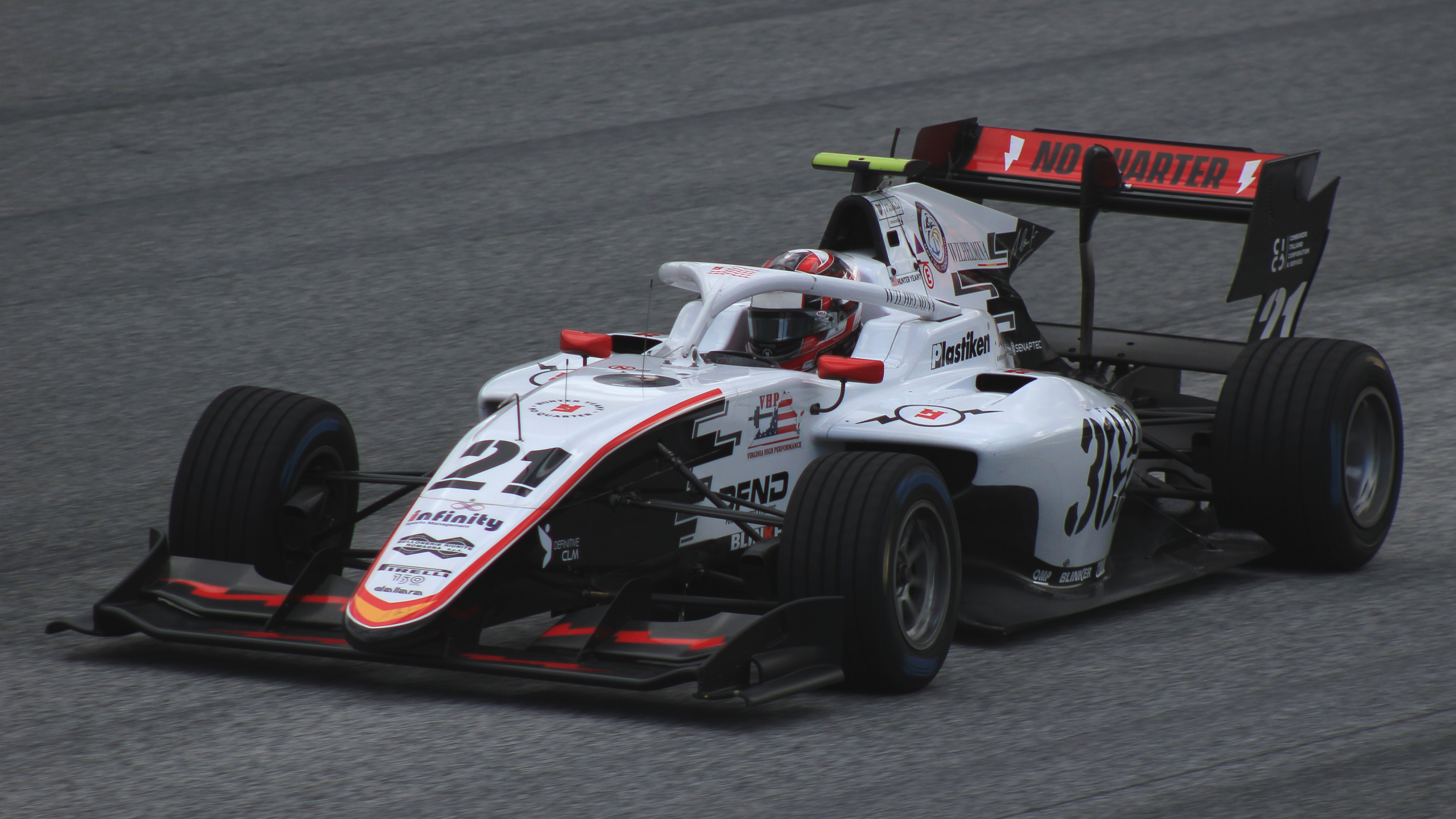
Yeany driving the Dallara F3 2019 during the 2022 Spielberg Formula 3 round.

Yeany took part in the 2021 post-season test at Circuit Ricardo Tormo with Campos Racing. In January 2022, the team announced that Yeany would drive for them in the 2022 season.

In the Spielberg round, during the sprint race, Yeany injured his wrist while making contact with a rival. He managed to continue and finish 21st. However, due to his injury, he was forced to withdraw from the feature race. Ultimately, he had to miss the Budapest round as well and was replaced by Oliver Goethe. He also missed the Zandvoort round and was replaced by Sebastián Montoya. Yeany made his return at the final round in Monza, and finished the races 24th and 17th. Yeany failed to score points and finished 33rd in the championship, with a best finish of 16th.

At the end of September, Yeany partook in the post-season test with Carlin, on Day 1 and Day 3 at Jerez.

==== 2023 ====
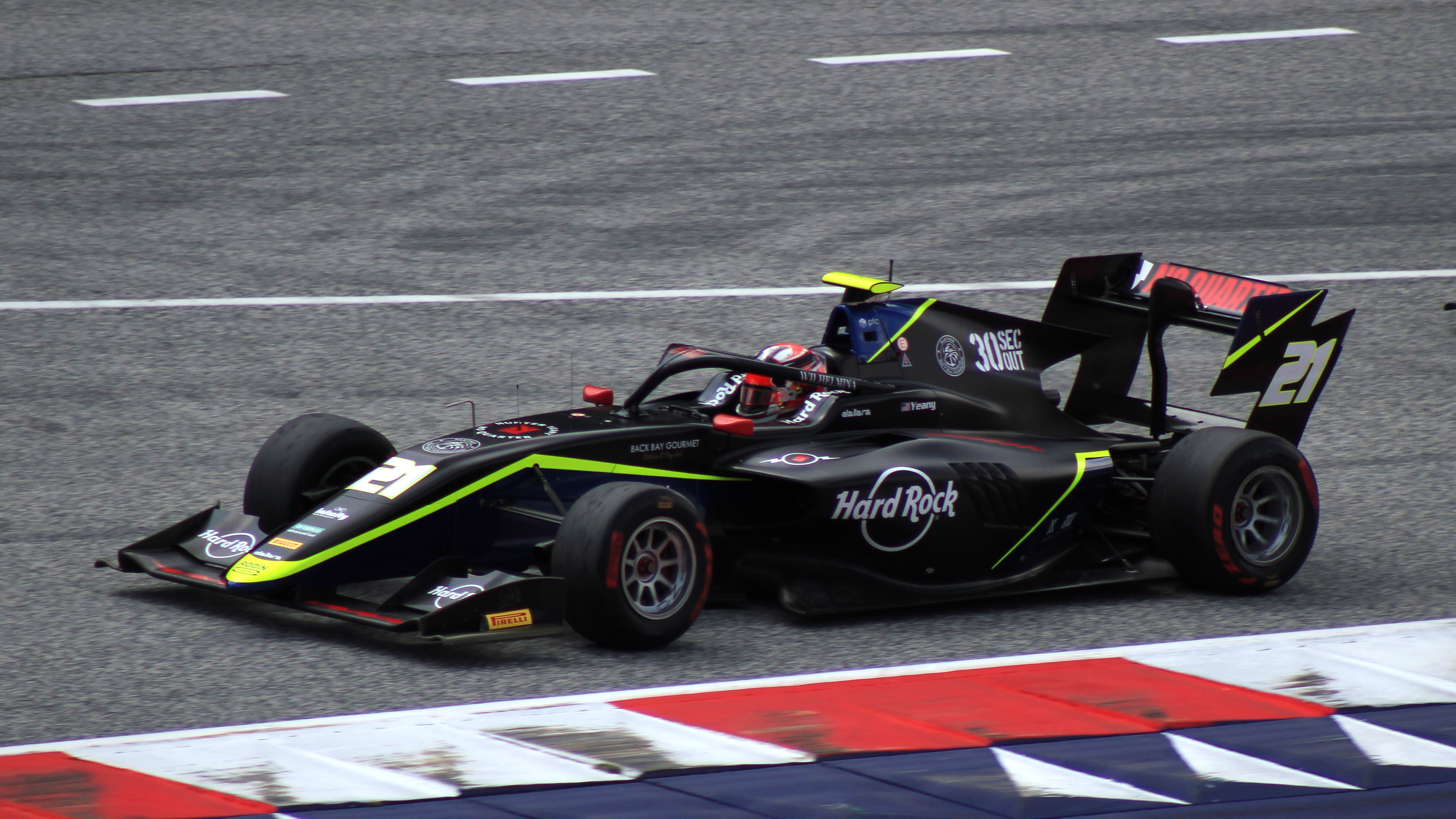
Yeany driving the Dallara F3 2019 during the 2023 Spielberg Formula 3 round.

On 19 December 2022, it was announced that Yeany would drive for Rodin Carlin in the 2023 season. He had similar results in the first half of the season compared to 2022, with a best finish of 16th place. Yeany was replaced by Max Esterson for the Silverstone and Hungary rounds. He later revealed on Instagram that he would not return to Formula 3 for the remainder of the season. Yeany would be eventually classified 30th in the standings.

=== Indy Pro 2000 / USF Pro 2000 Championship ===
==== 2021 ====
Yeany also competed in the Indy Pro 2000 Championship with Velocity Racing Development along with his Formula Regional campaign. He only competed in two rounds, before leaving the championship.

==== 2024 ====
Yeany would return to racing in America for 2024, driving in the USF Pro 2000 Championship with TJ Speed Motorsports. He took his first victory since 2020 by winning an incident-packed first race at the NOLA Motorsports Park. Yeany would miss the round at the Lucas Oil Indianapolis Raceway Park due to financial issues, and was replaced by former FIA Formula 3 rival Francesco Pizzi. He placed 14th in the standings, with 148 points.

== Personal life ==
Yeany was born in Charlottesville, Virginia and his racing hero is three-time Formula One champion Niki Lauda.

== Karting record ==
=== Karting career summary ===
Season	Series	Team	Position
2017	SKUSA SuperNationals — KA100 Junior	KartSport North America	60th
2018	SKUSA SuperNationals — Mini Swift	Veloce Sports/Benik	13th

== Racing record ==
=== Racing career summary ===
Season	Series	Team	Races	Wins	Poles	F/Laps	Podiums	Points	Position
2020	Formula 4 United States Championship	Velocity Racing Development	15	8	1	6	14	285	**1st**
2020	Formula Regional Americas Championship	Velocity Racing Development	3	0	0	0	0	0	NC†
2021	Formula Regional Americas Championship	Velocity Racing Development	12	0	1	0	0	67	12th
2021	Indy Pro 2000 Championship	Velocity Racing Development	8	0	0	0	0	79	14th
2021	FIA Formula 3 Championship	Charouz Racing System	6	0	0	0	0	0	33rd
2021	GB3 Championship	Fortec Motorsport	3	0	0	0	1	36	24th
2022	FIA Formula 3 Championship	Campos Racing	11	0	0	0	0	0	33rd
2023	FIA Formula 3 Championship	Rodin Carlin	10	0	0	0	0	0	30th
2024	USF Pro 2000 Championship	TJ Speed Motorsports	8	1	1	0	3	148	14th
2026	Michelin Pilot Challenge - GS	Medusa Motorsports							

^{†} As Yeany was a guest driver, he was ineligible to score points.

=== Complete Formula 4 United States Championship results ===
(key) (Races in bold indicate pole position) (Races in italics indicate fastest lap)

Year	Team	1	2	3	4	5	6	7	8	9	10	11	12	13	14	15	16	17	18	DC	Points
2020	Velocity Racing Development	MOH; 1; 1	MOH; 2; 2	**VIR**; **1**; 1	VIR; 2; 3	VIR; 3; 1	BAR; 1; 1	BAR; 2; 6	BAR; 3; 2	BAR; 4; 1	SEB; 1; 1	SEB; 2; 1	SEB; 3; 1	HMS; 1; 2	HMS; 2; 2	HMS; 3; 3	COA; 1	COA; 2	COA; 3	1st	285

=== Complete American open–wheel racing results ===
==== Formula Regional Americas Championship ====
(key) (Races in bold indicate pole position) (Races in italics indicate fastest lap)

Year	Team	1	2	3	4	5	6	7	8	9	10	11	12	13	14	15	16	17	18	Pos	Points
2020	Velocity Racing Development	MOH; 1	MOH; 2	VIR; 1	VIR; 2	VIR; 3	BAR; 1	BAR; 2	BAR; 3	SEB; 1	SEB; 2	SEB; 3	HMS; 1	HMS; 2	HMS; 3	COA; 1; 8	COA; 2; 6	COA; 3; 4		NC†	0
2021	Velocity Racing Development	ATL; 1; 7	ATL; 2; 6	ATL; 3; 5	**ROA**; **1**; 9	ROA; 2; 4	ROA; 3; 5	MOH; 1; 10	MOH; 2; 5	MOH; 3; 8	BRA; 1; 9	BRA; 2 Ret	BRA; 3; 9	VIR; 1	VIR; 2	VIR; 3	COA; 1	COA; 2	COA; 3	12th	67

^{†} As Yeany was a guest driver, he was ineligible to score points.

==== Indy Pro 2000 Championship / USF Pro 2000 Championship ====
(key) (Races in bold indicate pole position) (Races in italics indicate fastest lap)

Year	Team	1	2	3	4	5	6	7	8	9	10	11	12	13	14	15	16	17	18	Position	Points
2021	Velocity Racing Development	BAR; 10	BAR; 12	STP; 16	STP; 12	IMS	IMS	IMS	LOR	ROA; 8	ROA; 8	MOH; 11	MOH; 12	GMP	NJMP	NJMP	NJMP	MOH	MOH	14th	79
2024	TJ Speed Motorsports	STP; 1; 7	STP; 2; 13	LOU; 1; 1*	**LOU**; **2**; 2	LOU; 3; 3	IMS; 1; 5	IMS; 2; 11	IMS; 3; 4	IRP	ROA; 1	ROA; 2	ROA; 3	MOH; 1	MOH; 2	TOR; 1	TOR; 2	POR; 1	POR; 2	14th	148

=== Complete GB3 Championship results ===
(key) (Races in bold indicate pole position) (Races in italics indicate fastest lap)

Year	Entrant	1	2	3	4	5	6	7	8	9	10	11	12	13	14	15	16	17	18	19	20	21	22	23	24	DC	Points
2021	Fortec Motorsport	BRH; 1	BRH; 2	BRH; 3	SIL1; 1	SIL1; 2	SIL1; 3	DON1; 1	DON1; 2	DON1; 3	SPA; 1	SPA; 2	SPA; 3	SNE; 1	SNE; 2	SNE; 3	SIL2; 1	SIL2; 2	SIL2; 3	OUL; 1	OUL; 2	OUL; 3	DON2; 1; 8	DON2; 2; 15	DON2; 3; 3^{1}	24th	36

=== Complete FIA Formula 3 Championship results ===
(key) (Races in bold indicate pole position; races in italics indicate points for the fastest lap of top ten finishers)

Year	Entrant	1	2	3	4	5	6	7	8	9	10	11	12	13	14	15	16	17	18	19	20	21	DC	Points
2021	Charouz Racing System	CAT; 1	CAT; 2	CAT; 3	LEC; 1	LEC; 2	LEC; 3	RBR; 1	RBR; 2	RBR; 3	HUN; 1	HUN; 2	HUN; 3	SPA; 1; 18	SPA; 2; 25	SPA; 3 NC	ZAN; 1 Ret	ZAN; 2; 23	ZAN; 3; 22	SOC; 1	SOC; 2	SOC; 3	33rd	0
2022	Campos Racing	BHR; SPR; 23	BHR; FEA; 21	IMO; SPR; 17	IMO; FEA; 16	CAT; SPR; 27	CAT; FEA; 26	SIL; SPR; 16	SIL; FEA; 19	RBR; SPR; 22	RBR; FEA; WD	HUN; SPR	HUN; FEA	SPA; SPR	SPA; FEA	ZAN; SPR	ZAN; FEA	MNZ; SPR; 24	MNZ; FEA; 17				33rd	0
2023	Rodin Carlin	BHR; SPR; 20	BHR; FEA; 22	MEL; SPR; 22	MEL; FEA; 17	MON; SPR; 27	MON; FEA; 20	CAT; SPR; 16	CAT; FEA; Ret	RBR; SPR; 19	RBR; FEA; 21	SIL; SPR	SIL; FEA	HUN; SPR	HUN; FEA	SPA; SPR	SPA; FEA	MNZ; SPR	MNZ; FEA				30th	0

Sporting positions
Preceded by Joshua Car	Formula 4 United States Championship; Champion; 2020	Succeeded by Noel León
