= 2017 Pro Mazda Championship =

The 2017 Pro Mazda Championship was the 19th season in series history. A 12-race schedule was announced in September 2016.

This was the final season using the Star chassis and Mazda rotary engine combination. In 2018, the Tatuus-designed PM18 chassis would be the specified car, mated to a Mazda MZR piston engine.

Brazilian Victor Franzoni, who secured his ride in Pro Mazda with Juncos Racing the week before the season started, prevailed in a season-long back-and-forth championship battle with 2016 U.S. F2000 National Championship winner Anthony Martin. Franzoni held a small lead heading into the series' final double-header at Watkins Glen International. Franzoni won both races to clinch the championship. Franzoni finished first or second in every race and finished with seven wins from six poles. Martin won five races from six poles. Carlos Cunha captured podium finishes in the last five races (for six total) to capture third in the championship ahead of TJ Fischer who finished on the podium in the first four races but faded down the stretch. Every race was won by either Franzoni or Martin and every pole but one was captured by them, with Cunha sitting on the pole for the first race at the Mid-Ohio Sports Car Course.

The less-expensive National Class was more hotly contested than usual on an individual race basis, with some races seeing as many as five entries. However, only one driver Brendan Puderbach contested all twelve rounds of the championship and by virtue of that captured the National Class title. Bob Kaminsky captured a class-best five class wins and finished second in the championship.

== Drivers and teams ==
Team	No.	Drivers	Rounds
ArmsUp Motorsports	3	(United States) Matt Machiko	3–4, 11–12
ArmsUp Motorsports	6	(United States) Max Hanratty	1–2, 5–9
Cape Motorsports	8	(Australia) Anthony Martin	All
FatBoy Racing	3	(United States) Matt Machiko	1–2
FatBoy Racing	31	(United States) Brendan Puderbach (N)	All
FatBoy Racing	83	(United States) Charles Finelli (N)	1–6, 11–12
JDC MotorSports	12	(United States) Kris Wright	5–9, 11–12
Juncos Racing	23	(Brazil) Victor Franzoni	All
Juncos Racing	60	(United States) Jeff Green	All
Kaminsky Racing	57	(United States) Bob Kaminsky (N)	3–9
Kevin Davis Racing	44	(United States) Kevin Davis (N)	1–4
Team Pelfrey	80	(Russia) Nikita Lastochkin	All
Team Pelfrey	81	(Brazil) Carlos Cunha	All
Team Pelfrey	82	(United States) TJ Fischer	All
Team Pelfrey	84	(United States) Robert Megennis	11–12
Unfair Advantage Motorsports	2	(United States) Dave Zavelson (N)	5–9
Unfair Advantage Motorsports	5	(United States) Kevin Bury (N)	5–9
World Speed Motorsports	2	(Australia) Steven Ford (N)	3–4
World Speed Motorsports	13	(United States) Bobby Eberle	All
World Speed Motorsports	14	(United States) Sting Ray Robb	All
World Speed Motorsports	15	(United States) Phillippe Denes	1–4

Icon	Class
(N)	National Class

== Race calendar and results ==
Rnd	Circuit	Location	Date	Pole position	Fastest lap	Most laps led	Winning driver	Winning team
1	Streets of St. Petersburg	St. Petersburg, Florida	March 11	(Australia) Anthony Martin	(Australia) Anthony Martin	(Australia) Anthony Martin	(Australia) Anthony Martin	Cape Motorsports
2	Streets of St. Petersburg	St. Petersburg, Florida	March 12	(Australia) Anthony Martin	(Australia) Anthony Martin	(Australia) Anthony Martin	(Australia) Anthony Martin	Cape Motorsports
3	Indianapolis Motor Speedway road course	Speedway, Indiana	May 12	(Brazil) Victor Franzoni	(Brazil) Victor Franzoni	(Brazil) Victor Franzoni	(Brazil) Victor Franzoni	Juncos Racing
4	Indianapolis Motor Speedway road course	Speedway, Indiana	May 13	(Brazil) Victor Franzoni	(Brazil) Victor Franzoni	(Brazil) Victor Franzoni	(Brazil) Victor Franzoni	Juncos Racing
5	Grand Prix of Road America	Elkhart Lake, Wisconsin	June 25	(Brazil) Victor Franzoni	(Brazil) Victor Franzoni	(Brazil) Victor Franzoni	(Brazil) Victor Franzoni	Juncos Racing
6	Grand Prix of Road America	Elkhart Lake, Wisconsin	June 26	(Australia) Anthony Martin	(United States) TJ Fischer	(Australia) Anthony Martin	(Australia) Anthony Martin	Cape Motorsports
7	Mid-Ohio Sports Car Course	Lexington, Ohio	July 28	(Brazil) Carlos Cunha	(Brazil) Victor Franzoni	(Australia) Anthony Martin	(Australia) Anthony Martin	Cape Motorsports
8	Mid-Ohio Sports Car Course	Lexington, Ohio	July 29	(Australia) Anthony Martin	(Australia) Anthony Martin	(Australia) Anthony Martin	(Brazil) Victor Franzoni	Juncos Racing
9	Mid-Ohio Sports Car Course	Lexington, Ohio	July 30	(Australia) Anthony Martin	(Australia) Anthony Martin	(Australia) Anthony Martin	(Australia) Anthony Martin	Cape Motorsports
10	Gateway Motorsports Park	Madison, Illinois	August 25	(Australia) Anthony Martin	(Brazil) Victor Franzoni	(Brazil) Victor Franzoni	(Brazil) Victor Franzoni	Juncos Racing
11	Watkins Glen International	Watkins Glen, New York	September 2	(Brazil) Victor Franzoni	(Brazil) Victor Franzoni	(Australia) Anthony Martin	(Brazil) Victor Franzoni	Juncos Racing
12	Watkins Glen International	Watkins Glen, New York	September 3	(Brazil) Victor Franzoni	(Brazil) Carlos Cunha	(Brazil) Victor Franzoni	(Brazil) Victor Franzoni	Juncos Racing

== Championship standings ==
=== Drivers' Championship ===
Pos	Driver	STP		IMS		ROA		MOH			GMP	WGL		Points
Championship class
1	(Brazil) Victor Franzoni	2	2	**1***	**1***	**1***	2	2	1	2	1*	**1***	**1***	351
2	(Australia) Anthony Martin	**1***	**1***	2	4	2	**1***	1*	**2***	**1***	**2**	2	3	333
3	(Brazil) Carlos Cunha	4	12	4	3	9	4	**4**	3	3	3	3	2	237
4	(United States) TJ Fischer	3	3	3	2	15	12	3	4	4	4	10	5	224
5	(Russia) Nikita Lastochkin	5	5	6	5	3	3	5	5	6	6	13	4	203
6	(United States) Sting Ray Robb	7	4	7	7	4	11	10	6	5	7	4	6	185
7	(United States) Bobby Eberle	10	8	8	8	8	6	9	11	7	9	7	9	157
8	(United States) Jeff Green	13	9	10	13	6	5	13	13	10	5	11	10	151
9	(United States) Max Hanratty	8	6			5	15	6	10	8				97
10	(United States) Kris Wright					13	9	7	8	11		5	8	95
11	(United States) Matt Machiko	9	13	11	9							6	7	74
12	(United States) Phillippe Denes	6	7	5	6									61
13	(United States) Robert Megennis											12	DNS	21
National class
1	(United States) Brendan Puderbach	12	14	DNS	11	10	14	14	12	13	8	8	DNS	187
2	(United States) Bob Kaminsky			9	14	7	13	8	7	9				134
3	(United States) Charles Finelli	14	10	14	DNS	12	8					9	DNS	115
4	(United States) Dave Zavelson					11	7	11	9	12				91
5	(United States) Kevin Davis	11	11	12	10									80
6	(United States) Kevin Bury					14	10	12	14	14				64
7	(Australia) Steven Ford			13	12									30
Pos	Driver	STP		IMS		ROA		MOH			GMP	WGL		Points

Color	Result
Gold	Winner
Silver	2nd place
Bronze	3rd place
Green	4th & 5th place
Light Blue	6th–10th place
Dark Blue	Finished (Outside Top 10)
Purple	Did not finish
Red	Did not qualify (DNQ)
Brown	Withdrawn (Wth)
Black	Disqualified (DSQ)
White	Did not start (DNS)
Blank	Did not participate

**In-line notation**
**Bold**	Pole position (1 point)
Italics	Ran fastest race lap (1 point)
*	Led most race laps (1 point); Not awarded if more than one driver leads most laps
Rookie

=== Teams' championship ===
Pos	Team	Points
1	Team Pelfrey	381
2	Juncos Racing	372
3	World Speed Motorsports	267

== See also ==
2017 IndyCar Series season
2017 Indy Lights championship
