= Victor Franzoni =

Brazilian racing driver

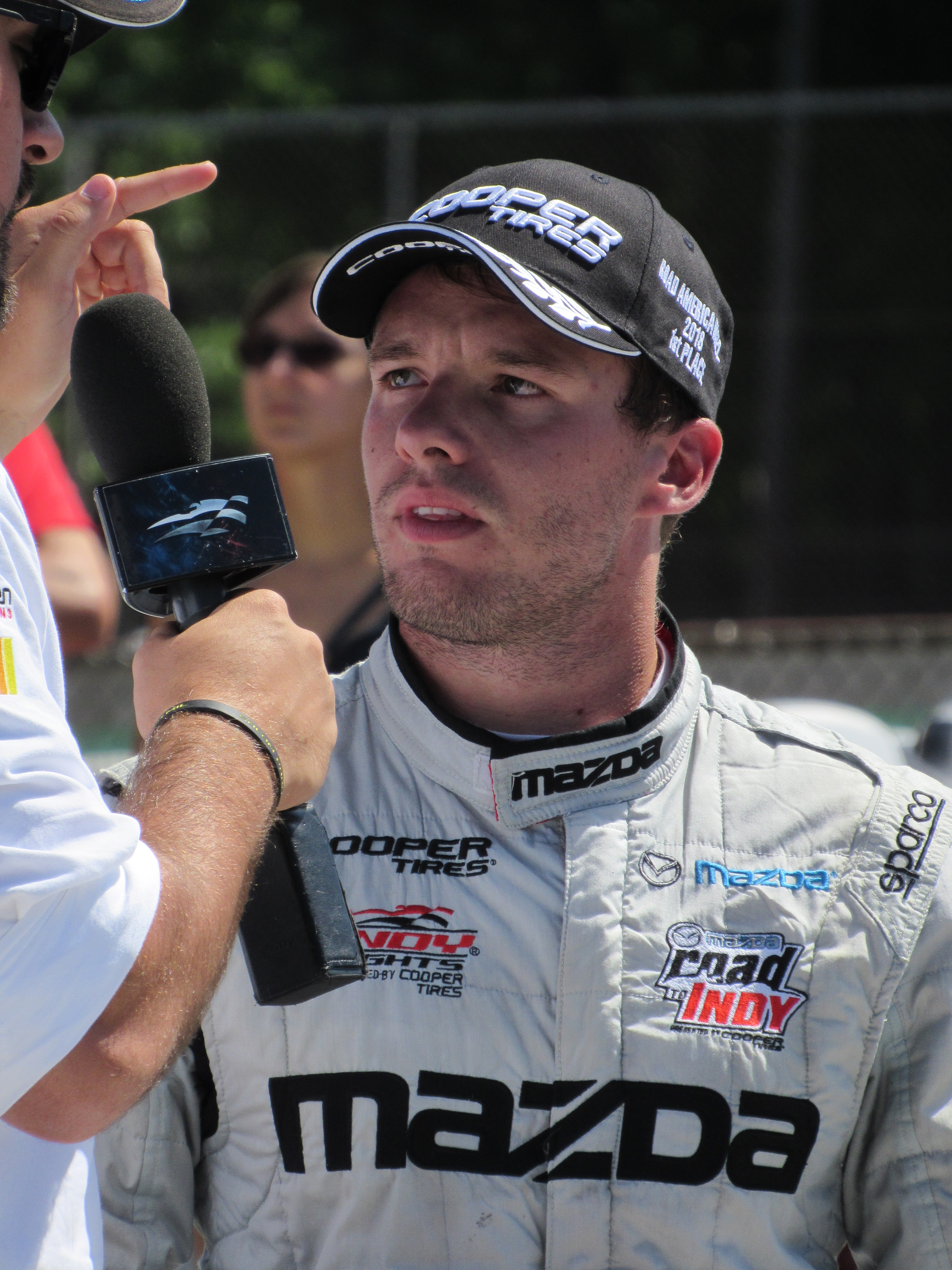
- Franzoni in 2018
- Nationality: Brazilian
- Born: Victor Coelho Franzoni da Silva; 5 October 1995 (age 31) São Paulo, São Paulo, Brazil
- Categorisation: FIA Silver

Previous series
- 2014-2016 2015 2013 2012 2011: USF2000; Pro Mazda; Eurocup Formula Renault 2.0; Formula Renault 2.0 Alps; Formula Future Fiat

Victor Coelho Franzoni da Silva (born 5 October 1995) is a Brazilian racing driver who most recently competed in Copa Truck. Franzoni raced in Formula Renault in Europe before switching to competition in the United States on the Road to Indy. He was champion of the Pro Mazda Championship in 2017, and previously competed in the IMSA SportsCar Championship and Indy NXT for Juncos Racing.

== Career ==
After karting Franzoni made his auto racing debut in the Brazilian Formula Future Fiat in 2011. Franzoni won races at Interlagos and Curitiba. A strong end of the season, with four consecutive podium finishes, placed Franzoni fourth in the series standings. In August 2011, Franzoni made his European racing debut at Circuit de Spa-Francorchamps. In the 2011 Formula Abarth season, the Brazilian joined Cram Competition with a best finish of ninth.

In 2012, Franzoni started the season in the Formula 3 Brazil Open. Racing in Class B, for older cars, Franzoni crashed out of the final race. For the regular season Franzoni joined Koiranen Motorsport for the 2012 Formula Renault 2.0 Alps Series. With two fourth places at the Red Bull Ring as his best result, Franzoni ended eleventh in the final standings. For 2013, Franzoni remained at Koiranen for their 2013 Eurocup Formula Renault 2.0 campaign. Struggling midfield, Franzoni scored two point finishes. In January 2014, Franzoni raced at Interlagos to compete in the 2014 Formula 3 Brazil Open. With a retirement in the pre-final, Franzoni was condemned to start the final race in seventh place. After a strong race, Franzoni finished second, behind Felipe Guimarães.

The 2014 regular season marked Franzoni's debut in the American USF2000 series. At Afterburner Autosport, he won his debut race in the streets of St. Petersburg. Collecting a total of four podium finishes, including his oval racing debut at Lucas Oil Raceway, Franzoni ended fifth in the season standings. The following season, Franzoni remained at Afterburner for the first six races of the season. Franzoni won one of the races at NOLA Motorsports Park before moving up into the Pro Mazda Championship, scoring another three top five finishes. Moving back into USF2000, Franzoni joined ArmsUp Motorsports. Franzoni won three races, at Toronto, and two at Laguna Seca. With another eight podium finishes, Franzoni secured the third place in the championship.

== Racing record ==
=== Career summary ===
Season	Series	Team	Races	Wins	Poles	F/Laps	Podiums	Points	Position
2011	Formula Future Fiat Brasil		11	2	0	6	6	98	5th
2011	Formula Abarth European Series	Cram Competition	2	0	0	0	0	2	23rd
2011	Formula Abarth Italian Series	Cram Competition	2	0	0	0	0	3	21st
2012	Eurocup Formula Renault 2.0	Koiranen Motorsport	2	0	0	0	0	0	45th
2012	Formula Renault 2.0 Alps Series	Koiranen Motorsport	12	0	2	0	0	44	11th
2012	Formula 3 Brazil Open	Hitech Racing	1	0	0	0	0	N/A	DNF
2013	Eurocup Formula Renault 2.0	Koiranen GP	14	0	0	0	0	7	19th
2014	U.S. F2000 National Championship	Afterburner Autosport	14	1	1	2	4	202	5th
2014	U.S. F2000 Winterfest	Afterburner Autosport	5	1	0	1	3	84	7th
2014	Eurocup Formula Renault 2.0	China BRT by JCS	2	0	0	0	0	4	21st
2014	Formula 3 Brazil Open	Hitech Racing	1	0	0	0	1	N/A	**2nd**
2015	U.S. F2000 National Championship	Afterburner Autosport	6	1	0	2	2	98	14th
2015	U.S. F2000 Winterfest	Afterburner Autosport	5	2	1	1	3	131	**2nd**
2015	Pro Mazda Championship	M1 Racing	9	0	0	1	0	91	16th
2015	Formula 3 Brasil - Class A	RR Racing	2	0	0	0	0	5	13th
2016	U.S. F2000 National Championship	ArmsUp Motorsports	16	3	2	3	11	360	**3rd**
2017	Pro Mazda Championship	Juncos Racing	12	7	6	7	12	351	**1st**
2018	Indy Lights	Juncos Racing	17	1	1	3	5	341	5th
2018	Súper TC2000	Renault Sport	1	0	0	0	0	0	NC
2019	IMSA SportsCar Championship - DPi	Juncos Racing	2	0	0	0	0	43	26th
2019	IMSA SportsCar Championship - GTD	Via Italia Racing	1	0	1	0	0	23	51st
2020	Formula Regional Americas Championship	Newman Wachs Racing	17	0	0	1	10	225	**3rd**
2020	Lamborghini Super Trofeo Europe - Pro-Am	Oregon Team	2	1	1	1	2	28	7th
2022	Império Endurance Brasil - GT3	Via Italia Racing	1	0	0	0	0	?	?
2023	Copa Truck	Tiger Team							
2023	Indy NXT	Juncos Hollinger Racing	5	0	0	0	0	91	21st

=== Complete Eurocup Formula Renault 2.0 results ===
(key) (Races in bold indicate pole position; races in italics indicate fastest lap)

Year	Entrant	1	2	3	4	5	6	7	8	9	10	11	12	13	14	DC	Points
2012	Koiranen Motorsport	ALC; 1	ALC; 2	SPA; 1; 22	SPA; 2 Ret	NÜR; 1	NÜR; 2	MSC; 1	MSC; 2	HUN; 1	HUN; 2	LEC; 1	LEC; 2	CAT; 1	CAT; 2	45th	0
2013	Koiranen GP	ALC; 1; 19	ALC; 2; 13	SPA; 1; 12	SPA; 2; 13	MSC; 1; 26	MSC; 2; 17	RBR; 1; 19	RBR; 2 Ret	HUN; 1 Ret	HUN; 2; 23	LEC; 1; 12	LEC; 2; 8	CAT; 1; 10	CAT; 2; 30†	19th	7
2014	China BRT by JCS	ALC; 1	ALC; 2	SPA; 1	SPA; 2	MSC; 1	MSC; 2	NÜR; 1; 9	NÜR; 2; 19	HUN; 1	HUN; 2	LEC; 1	LEC; 2	JER; 1	JER; 2	20th	4

=== Complete Formula Renault 2.0 Alps Series results ===
(key) (Races in bold indicate pole position; races in italics indicate fastest lap)

Year	Team	1	2	3	4	5	6	7	8	9	10	11	12	13	14	Pos	Points
2012	Koiranen Motorsport	MNZ; 1 Ret	MNZ; 2; 16	PAU; 1; 23	PAU; 2; 19	IMO; 1 Ret	IMO; 2; 16	SPA; 1	SPA; 2	**RBR**; **1**; 4	**RBR**; **2**; 4	MUG; 1; 9	MUG; 2; 8	CAT; 1; 6	CAT; 2; 8	11th	44

=== Complete Formula 3 Brasil results ===
(key) (Races in bold indicate pole position) (Races in italics indicate fastest lap)

Year	Entrant	1	2	3	4	5	6	7	8	9	10	11	12	13	14	15	16	Pos	Points
2015	Hitech Racing	CUR1; 1	CUR1; 2	VEL; 1	VEL; 2	SCS; 1	SCS; 2	CUR2; 1	CUR2; 2	CAS; 1	CAS; 2	CGR; 1	CGR; 2	CUR3; 1	CUR3; 2	INT; 1 Ret	INT; 2; 7	13th	5

=== American open-wheel racing results ===
(key) (Races in bold indicate pole position, races in italics indicate fastest race lap)

==== USF2000 National Championship ====
Year	Team	1	2	3	4	5	6	7	8	9	10	11	12	13	14	15	16	Rank	Points
2014	Afterburner Autosport	**STP**; 1	STP; DSQ	BAR; 13	BAR; 3	IMS; 15	IMS; 3	LOR; 3	TOR; 7	TOR; 4	MOH; 8	MOH; 14	MOH; 5	SON; 6	SON; 19			5th	202
2015	Afterburner Autosport	STP; 6	STP; 16	NOL; 4	NOL; 1	BAR; 2	BAR; DSQ	IMS	IMS	LOR	TOR	TOR	MOH	MOH	MOH	LAG	LAG	14th	98
2016	ArmsUp Motorsports	STP; 6	STP; 12	BAR; 2	BAR; 9	IMS; 3	IMS; 2	LOR; 3	ROA; 4	ROA; 2	TOR; 1	TOR; 3	MOH; 2	MOH; 3	MOH; 4	**LAG**; 1	**LAG**; 1	3rd	360

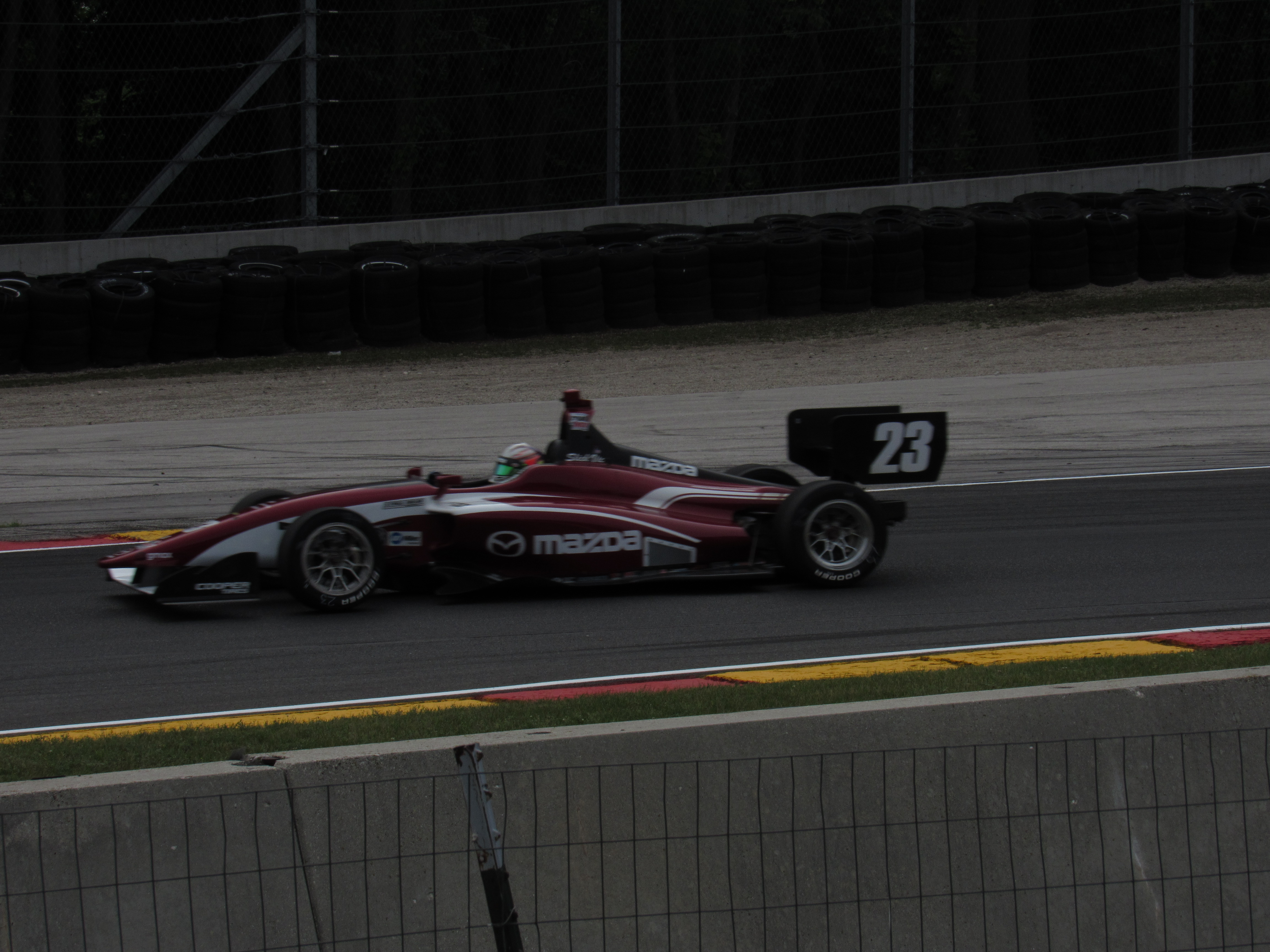
Franzoni driving his Indy Lights car at Road America in 2018

==== Pro Mazda Championship ====
Year	Team	1	2	3	4	5	6	7	8	9	10	11	12	13	14	15	16	17	Rank	Points
2015	M1 Racing	STP	STP	LOU	LOU	BAR	BAR	IMS; 10	IMS; 5	IMS; 19	LOR; 6	TOR; 4	TOR; 16	IOW	MOH; 10	MOH; 4	LGA; 19	LGA; DNS	16th	91
2017	Juncos Racing	STP; 2	STP; 2	**IMS**; 1	**IMS**; 1	**RDA**; 1	RDA; 2	MOH; 2	MOH; 1	MOH; 2	GMP; 1	**WGL**; 1	**WGL**; 1						1st	351

==== Indy Lights ====
Year	Team	1	2	3	4	5	6	7	8	9	10	11	12	13	14	15	16	17	Rank	Points
2018	Juncos Racing	STP; 4	STP; 4	ALA; 4	ALA; 2	IMS; 6	IMS; 3	INDY; 8	**RDA**; 3	RDA; 1	IOW; 6	TOR; 6	TOR; 7	MOH; 4	MOH; 6	GTW; 6	POR; 3	POR; 5	5th	341
2023	Juncos Hollinger Racing	STP	ALA	IMS	DET	DET	ROA	MOH	IOW	NSH; 14	IMS; 19	GTW	POR; 11	LAG; 6	LAG; 13				21st	91

=== Complete IMSA SportsCar Championship results ===
(key) (Races in bold indicate pole position; results in italics indicate fastest lap)

Year	Entrant	Class	Make	Engine	1	2	3	4	5	6	7	8	9	10	11	Rank	Points
2019	Via Italia Racing	GTD	Ferrari 488 GT3	Ferrari F154CB 3.9 L Turbo V8	**DAY**; 8	SEB	MOH				LIM		VIR			51st	23
2019	Juncos Racing	DPi	Cadillac DPi-V.R	Cadillac 5.5 L V8				DET; 8	WGL	MOS; 11		ELK		LGA	PET	26th	43

Sporting positions
Preceded by Aaron Telitz	Pro Mazda Championship; Champion; 2017	Succeeded by Rinus VeeKay
