= Anthony Martin (racing driver) =

Australian racing driver

- Born: 13 February 1995 (age 31) Kalgoorlie, Western Australia, Australia

U.S. F2000 National Championship career
- Debut season: 2015
- Current team: Cape Motorsports & Wayne Taylor Racing
- Car number: 8
- Former teams: John Cummiskey Racing

Anthony Martin (born 13 February 1995) is an Australian former race car driver.

== Early life ==
Martin was born in Kalgoorlie, Western Australia. He began racing go karts at the age of 13.

== Career ==
In 2013 and 2014, Martin competed in Australian Formula Ford Championship. He was the 2013 Western Australia Formula Ford Champion and Rookie of the Year and 2014 championship runner-up. In 2015, he made his debut in the U.S. F2000 National Championship with John Cummiskey Racing. He finished in fourth place and was named rookie of the year. He returned to the series in 2016, moving to Cape Motorsports with Wayne Taylor Racing and won the championship after a six-win season. The win saw him climb the Road to Indy ladder.

In 2017, Martin made his Pro Mazda Championship debut with Cape Motorsports and finished the year in second place.

== Racing record ==
=== Career summary ===
| Season | Series | Team | Races | Wins | Poles | F/laps | Podiums | Points | Position |
|---|---|---|---|---|---|---|---|---|---|
| 2013 | Western Australia Formula Ford 1600 | Anthony Martin | ? | ? | ? | ? | ? | 30 | 9th |
| 2014 | Western Australia Formula Ford 1600 | Fastlane Racing | 18 | 7 | 0 | 2 | 16 | 391 | 2nd |
| 2015 | U.S. F2000 National Championship | John Cummiskey Racing | 16 | 0 | 0 | 0 | 6 | 300 | 4th |
| 2016 | U.S. F2000 National Championship | Cape Motorsports with Wayne Taylor Racing | 16 | 7 | 4 | 3 | 9 | 347 | 1st |
| 2017 | Pro Mazda Championship | Cape Motorsports | 12 | 5 | 6 | 4 | 11 | 333 | 2nd |
| 2017 | Atlantic Championship | | 2 | 0 | 1 | 0 | 0 | 59 | 19th |

== Motorsports career results ==
=== American open–wheel racing results ===
==== U.S. F2000 National Championship ====
| Year | Team | 1 | 2 | 3 | 4 | 5 | 6 | 7 | 8 | 9 | 10 | 11 | 12 | 13 | 14 | 15 | 16 | Rank | Points |
|---|---|---|---|---|---|---|---|---|---|---|---|---|---|---|---|---|---|---|---|
| 2015 | John Cummiskey Racing | STP; 4 | STP; 4 | NOL; 16 | NOL; 5 | BAR; 4 | BAR; 2 | IMS; 4 | IMS; 3 | LOR; 4 | TOR; 3 | TOR; 4 | MOH; 2 | MOH; 14 | MOH; 4 | LAG; 2 | LAG; 4 | 4th | 300 |
| 2016 | Cape Motorsports Wayne Taylor Racing | STP; 5 | STP; 10 | BAR; 3 | BAR; 4 | IMS; 1 | IMS; 4 | LOR; 1 | ROA; 1 | ROA; 1 | TOR; 16 | TOR; 2 | MOH; 1 | MOH; 1 | MOH; 1 | LAG; 3 | LAG; 2 | 1st | 394 |

==== Pro Mazda Championship ====
| Year | Team | 1 | 2 | 3 | 4 | 5 | 6 | 7 | 8 | 9 | 10 | 11 | 12 | Rank | Points |
|---|---|---|---|---|---|---|---|---|---|---|---|---|---|---|---|
| 2017 | Cape Motorsports | STP; 1 | STP; 1 | IMS; 2 | IMS; 4 | ROA; 2 | ROA; 1 | MOH; 1 | MOH; 2 | MOH; 1 | GMP; 2 | WGL; 2 | WGL; 3 | 2nd | 333 |

Sporting positions
| Preceded by Nico Jamin | U.S. F2000; Champion; 2016 | Succeeded by Oliver Askew |
