= USF Pro 2000 Championship =

North American auto racing series

- Category: Open Wheel Racing
- Country: United States
- Inaugural season: 1991
- Drivers: 28
- Teams: 8
- Constructors: Tatuus
- Engine suppliers: Mazda
- Tire suppliers: Continental
- Drivers' champion: (United States) Jack Jeffers
- Teams' champion: (United States) Turn 3 Motorsport
- Official website: usfpro2000.com

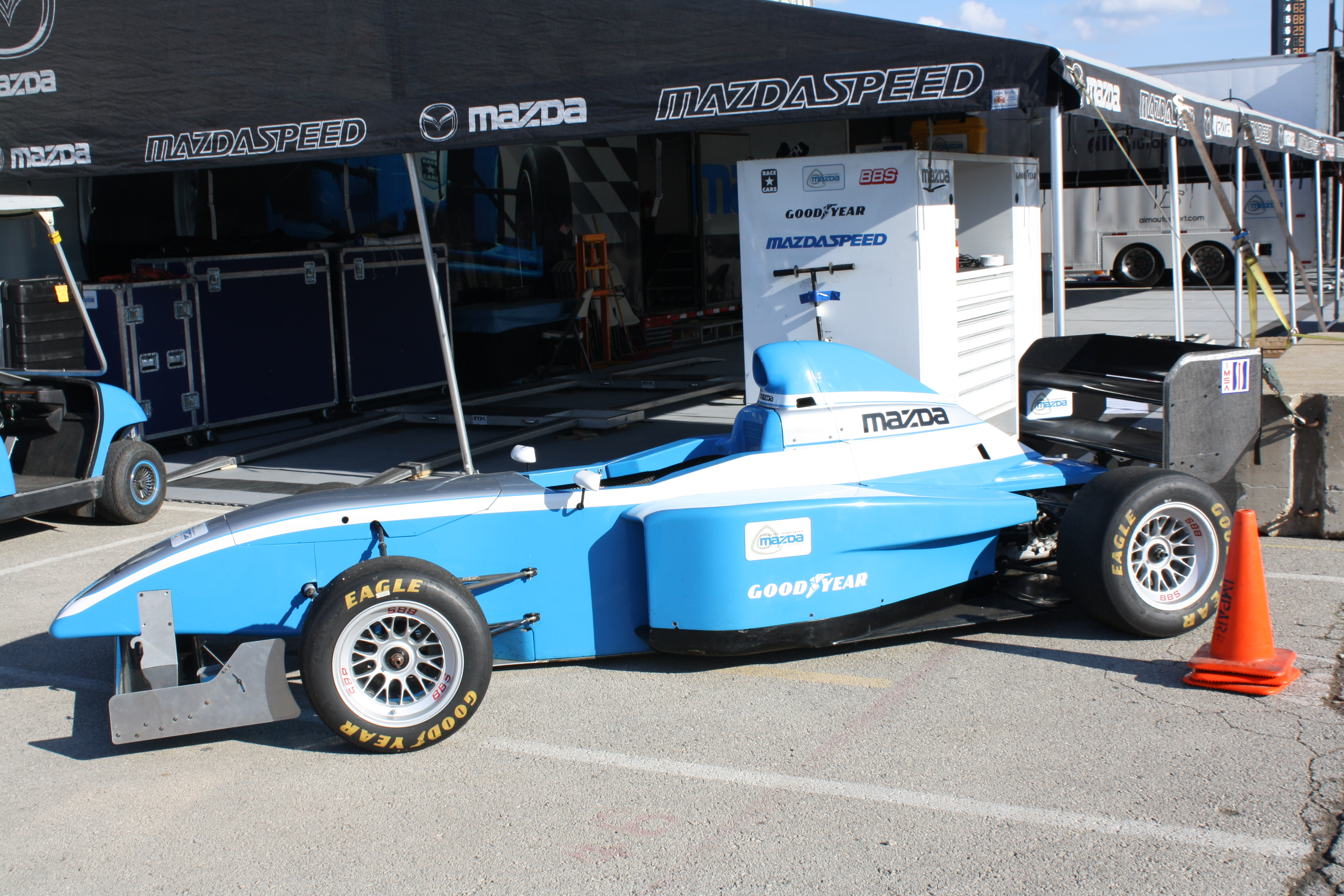
Star Mazda car in 2009

The USF Pro 2000 Championship Presented by Continental Tires, formerly known as the Star Mazda Championship, Pro Mazda Championship, and later Indy Pro 2000 Championship, is a North American open-wheel racing series held since 1991. It serves as the third step on the USF Pro Championships ladder system, between the USF2000 Championship and Indy NXT. The series is sanctioned by the United States Auto Club (USAC) and operated by Andersen Promotions. It competes on all open-wheel disciplines: road courses, street courses, and ovals.

The series' champion is awarded a scholarship package to advance to Indy NXT competition for the following season. Many Pro Mazda/USF Pro 2000 graduates have gone on to race in top-tier open-wheel series, including American Formula One and NASCAR driver Scott Speed, IndyCar Series drivers Marco Andretti, Graham Rahal, James Hinchcliffe and Raphael Matos, and Rolex Sports Car Series and NASCAR driver Michael McDowell.

== History ==
=== Background ===
In 1983, a number of Formula Ford race cars powered by Mazda rotary engines were built by Hayashi Racing in Japan and imported to the United States for use by the Jim Russell Racing School. Enough cars were constructed to run a one-make series, the Mazda Pro Series, which began in 1984 at the Long Beach Grand Prix. In late 1984, following modifications to the cars' rollover structures to bring them in line with SCCA regulations, the so-called "Formula Russell" became so popular that numerous regional and divisional series were established by the Jim Russell Racing School.

Throughout the remainder of the 1980s, the series would gain six geographic divisions, each of which held their own championship. Early Mazda Pro Series competitors included Johnny O'Connell, Tommy Kendall, Mike Groff, Jeff Krosnoff, Norm Breedlove (son of Craig Breedlove), and Jon Beekhuis.

=== Foundation ===
==== 1990s ====
The Star Mazda Championship debuted in 1991 at Willow Springs, with Mark Rodrigues driving for Valley Motor Center (the constructor of the new 1990 chassis) claiming the inaugural win. The series gradually rose in importance on the American open-wheel racing landscape, as similar series such as the Barber Dodge Pro Series, Formula BMW Americas and Formula TR 2000 Pro Series ceased to operate, and later emerged as the primary series of its kind in the US.

1996 marked the first Star Mazda Championship race as a supporting event on an Indy Racing League weekend at the Phoenix 200 in March, and the first nationally televised Star Mazda Championship race. A new title sponsor was gained in 1999, making the series the Best Western Star Mazda Championship; the same year, it became a national professional series supporting the American Le Mans Series in its inaugural year. Joey Hand won five of the season's seven races and became the first driver in series history to win four races in a row. His prize included a new Mazda Miata road car.

==== 2000s ====
In 2001, the series was renamed the Star Mazda North American Championship Presented by Goodyear. Scott Bradley with World Speed Motorsports claimed the championship.

In 2003, the decision was made to utilize the Mazda RX-8's new 13B-MSP Renesis engine in a new Star Mazda car. The Star Mazda "Pro" car was introduced the following year, with a carbon fiber chassis built by Élan Motorsport Technologies and a power output of 250 hp (190 kW) from said Renesis engine (up from the previous 13B's 190 hp (140 kW)). Michael McDowell, Raphael Matos, and Adrian Carrio won the 2004, 2005, and 2006 championships, respectively.

2007 saw the formation of the Mazdaspeed Motorsports Driver Development Ladder, created to provide funding for champions in various Mazda-powered series to move up in class. Dane Cameron became the first Star Mazda champion to move up to the Atlantic Championship via the Mazdaspeed ladder. Joel Miller, the 2007 Skip Barber Pro Series Champion, became the first driver to move up to Star Mazda via the ladder in 2008.

Also in 2008, the Star Mazda Championship changed from rolling starts to standing starts to better prepare drivers for moving up to the Atlantic Championship and Champ Car World Series. Bias-ply racing slicks were abandoned in favour of radials designed specifically for the series by Goodyear (the sole tire provider for the national series since its inception). Both Goodyear and Mazda signed 5-year extensions of their title sponsorship of the series, through the end of the 2012 season.

In 2009, the Star Mazda car underwent its first major mechanical upgrade since it was introduced, which included a revised aerodynamic package and engine and suspension modifications. This optional upgrade was designed to lower the cost of competition and make the car easier to maintain and tune. That year, Raphael Matos became the first Star Mazda driver to race in each Mazda-powered series (Skip Barber, Star Mazda, Atlantic) and graduate to IndyCar. Oval races also rejoined the Star Mazda schedule for the first time since 2006; events included the Milwaukee Mile (winner Anders Krohn) and the Iowa Speedway (winner Peter Dempsey).

==== 2010s ====
In 2010, the Star Mazda Championship became a part of the IRL-sanctioned Mazda Road to Indy program, alongside the U.S. F2000 and Indy Lights. Through the Mazda Road to Indy program, the Star Mazda champion would receive funding to compete in Indy Lights the following year. The first Road to Indy race was held with all three series at the same event, the 2010 Grand Prix of St. Petersburg. Championship winner Conor Daly became the fourth driver in Star Mazda history (after Joey Hand in 1999, Michael McDowell in 2004, and Raphael Matos in 2005) to win four races in a row. Andretti Autosport joined the series in 2011, becoming the first team to compete at every level of the Road to Indy, including IndyCar. Tristan Vautier and Jack Hawksworth respectively won the 2011 and 2012 championships.

In December 2012, Star Mazda series founder Gary Rodriguez sold the series to Dan Andersen's Andersen Promotions, which already sanctioned the USF2000 Championship, Andersen previously owned a multi-car Star Mazda team, Andersen Racing. The series was renamed the Pro Mazda Championship, and Cooper became the new tire supplier.

Rookie Matthew Brabham of Andretti Autosport won the 2013 championship, with Gabby Chaves, Sage Karam, Jack Hawksworth, and Zach Veach advancing to Indy Lights.

in 2014, Juncos Racing's Spencer Pigot and Wayne Taylor Racing's Scott Hargrove battled down to the wire, with the championship title changing hands three times through the last race. Pigot, leading going into the race, came together with Hargrove and fell to the back of the field, only to see his championship hopes return when Hargrove's gearbox failed. Pigot took the title by 10 points and earned the Mazda scholarship into the Indy Lights series. Also graduating to Indy lights were Pigot's Juncos teammate Kyle Kaiser and Andretti Autosport's Shelby Blackstock.

Uruguayan Santiago Urrutia earned the 2015 title over American Neil Alberico with three wins and 10 podium finishes. Uruttia earned a $590,300 scholarship into the Indy Lights series, where he would be joined by Alberico and Andretti's Dalton Kellett.

Team Pelfrey teammates Pato O'Ward and Aaron Telitz battled throughout the 2016 season, with O'Ward taking six of the first seven victories and Telitz taking five of the final seven. Telitz's run of nine straight podium finishes (including a sweep of the victories at his home track of Road America) to end the season sealed his championship victory and the $601,700 scholarship into the Indy Lights series.

In 2018, the Indy Pro 2000 switched to a chassis by Tatuus, the PM-18, which is based on the USF-17 that debuted in USF2000 the previous season. It has a carbon and aluminum honeycomb monocoque chassis, and a 2.0L 275 hp engine. Also, the scholarship to Indy Lights was increased to $790,300, the top three in the final championship standings would be awarded an Indy Lights test, and the top rookie would receive a Mazda road car. Juncos Racing's Victor Franzoni and Cape Motorsports' Anthony Martin enjoyed a spirited fight from the season opener, with the pair splitting the first 10 races of the season. At the Watkins Glen finale, Franzoni scored both victories to take the 2017 championship over Martin by 18 points. Franzoni graduated to Indy Lights with Juncos Racing, who fielded a team in the 2018 Indianapolis 500.

Mazda departed from the Road to Indy program for the 2019 season. The series was rebranded to Indy Pro 2000, with Andersen Promotions maintaining its ownership of the series.

==== 2020s ====
The USF Pro 2000 Championship launched an updated Tatuus IP-22 chassis for the 2022 season, including the adoption of a halo. The following year, the series was rebranded as USF Pro 2000 Championship as the Road to Indy program was replaced by the USF Pro Championships.

For the 2024 season, Continental became the new tire provider for the USF Pro Championships, including the USF Pro 2000.

In 2026, the series announced a new Tatuus chassis for the 2028 season. It will have a new Honda K20-based 2.0L turbocharged engine, with over 300 hp and a push-to-pass system.

== Cars ==
=== Star Formula Mazda 'Pro' (2004–2017) ===
Star Mazda 'Pro'
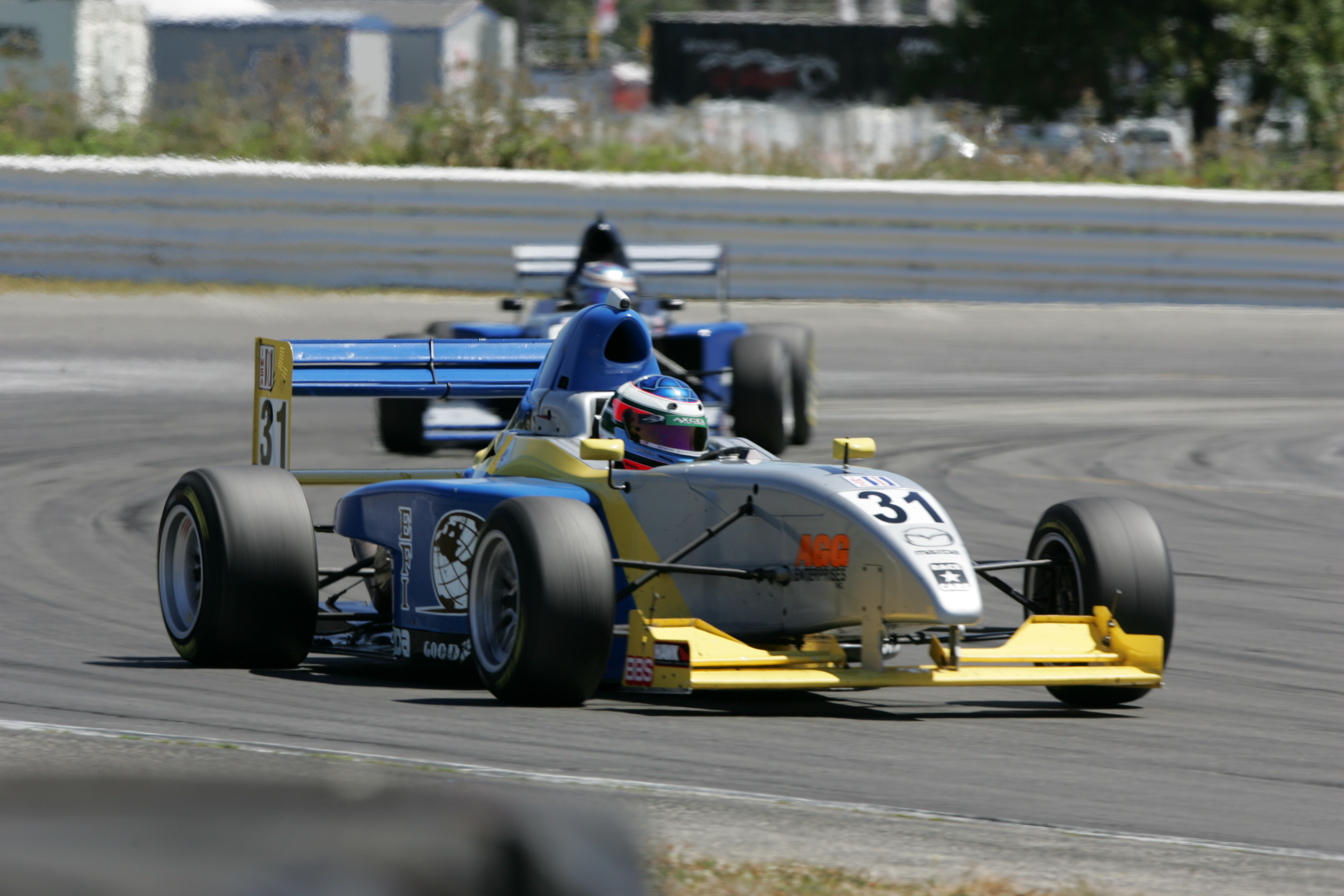
- Category: Star Mazda (Formula Mazda)
- Constructor: Star Race Cars

Technical specifications
- Chassis: Carbon fiber composite monocoque
- Suspension: Pushrod, inboard with two-way adjustable shock absorbers, adjustable rear anti-roll bar, cockpit adjustable front anti-roll bar.
- Engine: Mazda "Renesis" 1.3 L (79.3 cu in) 2-rotor wankel mid-engined
- Transmission: 6-speed sequential manual
- Power: 240–260 hp (180–190 kW)
- Weight: ~ 1,090 lb (494.4 kg)
- Tyres: Goodyear (1991–2012); Cooper (2013–2017)

Competition history
- Debut: 2004

The Star Mazda Pro is an open-wheel formula racing car, designed, developed and built by Star Race Cars, for the North American Pro Mazda Championship spec-series, between 2004 and 2017.

=== Tatuus PM-18 (2018–2021) ===
Tatuus PM-18
- Category: Indy Pro 2000
- Predecessor: Tatuus USF-17
- Successor: Tatuus IP-22

Technical specifications
- Chassis: Carbon fiber and aluminum honeycomb monocoque built to FIA F4 standards
- Suspension: Double-wishbone push-rod (front and rear)
- Axle track: 1,560 mm (61.42 in) (front); 1,510 mm (59.45 in) (rear)
- Wheelbase: 2,750 mm (108.27 in)
- Engine: Mazda MZR-PM18A 1,999 cc (122 cu in) inline-4
- Transmission: Sadev SL82 6-speed sequential with Magneti Marelli gear shift system
- Power: 275 hp (205 kW)
- Weight: Approx. 500 kg (1,102 lb) dry
- Brakes: Performance Friction Brakes ZR24 4-piston monobloc calipers with 274 mm (11 in) discs (front and rear) with driver-adjustable bias
- Tires: Cooper

Competition history
- Debut: 2018

The Tatuus PM-18, used from 2018 through 2021, is based on the previous year's USF-17 chassis to help control teams' operational costs.

- Chassis: Includes side impact panels, front and rear impact structures, HANS-compliant IndyCar head restraint, front and rear wheel tethers, upgraded uprights, and upgraded front bulkhead structure for US-specific ovals
- Bodywork: Unique Indy Pro 2000 engine cover, carbon composite diffuser, adjustable dual-element rear wing and single plane carbon fiber front wing with adjustable flaps and Indy Pro 2000-specific front and rear endplates. All bodywork carbon fiber construction.
- Electrical: Cosworth Omega L2 Plus Data Logger linked via CAN to Cosworth SQ6 ECU and GCU; option to upgrade to an Omega Pro at an added cost
- Steering wheel: Cosworth CFW277 with integrated dash and gear change paddles
- Fuel capacity: 40 L (11 US gal)
- Fuel delivery: Electronic fuel injection
- Suspension: Dynamic DSSV two-way adjustable dampers and a range of adjustable front and rear anti-roll bars. Springs provided by Hyperco, with six spring rates available, interchangeable for front and rear axles. Upgraded front and rear uprights for US-specific ovals. Ride height, camber, and toe adjustment on both axles, with roll center, anti-squat, and anti-dive adjustments on the rear axle.

=== Tatuus IP-22 (2022) ===
The Tatuus IP-22 is the replacement for the PM-18, now featuring a halo.

== Champions ==
Season	Champion
Star Mazda Championship
1991	(United States) Mark Rodriguez
1992	(United States) Chuck West
1993	(United States) Ben Massey
1994	(United States) Brad Loehner
1995	(United States) Mark Rodriguez
1996	(United States) Rich Stephens
1997	(United States) Tony Buffomante
1998	(United States) Ian Lacy
1999	(United States) Joey Hand
2000	(United States) Bernardo Martinez
2001	(United States) Scott Bradley
2002	(United States) Guy Cosmo
2003	(Venezuela) Luis Schiavo
2004	(United States) Michael McDowell
2005	(Brazil) Raphael Matos
2006	(United States) Adrian Carrio
2007	(United States) Dane Cameron
2008	(United States) John Edwards
2009	(United Kingdom) Adam Christodoulou
2010	(United States) Conor Daly
2011	(France) Tristan Vautier
2012	(United Kingdom) Jack Hawksworth
Pro Mazda Championship
2013	(Australia) Matthew Brabham
2014	(United States) Spencer Pigot
2015	(Uruguay) Santiago Urrutia
2016	(United States) Aaron Telitz
2017	(Brazil) Victor Franzoni
2018	(Netherlands) Rinus VeeKay
Indy Pro 2000 Championship
2019	(United States) Kyle Kirkwood
2020	(United States) Sting Ray Robb
2021	(Denmark) Christian Rasmussen
2022	(United Kingdom) Louis Foster
USF Pro 2000 Championship
2023	(United States) Myles Rowe
2024	(Australia) Lochie Hughes
2025	(United States) Max Garcia
2026	(United States) Jack Jeffers
