= Robert Megennis =

American racing driver

Robert Kwon Megennis
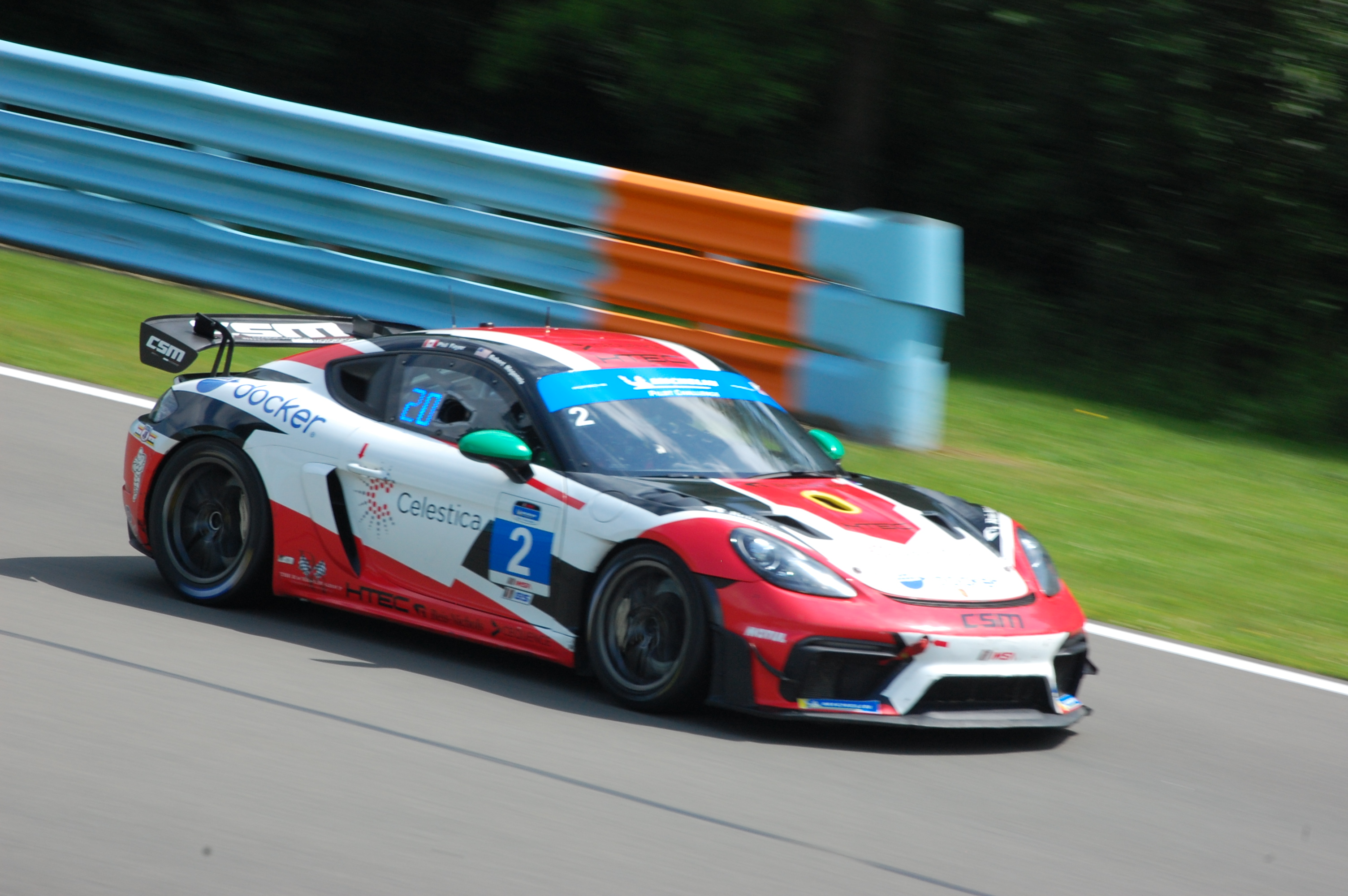
- Nationality: (United States) American (United Kingdom) British (South Korea) Korean via triple nationality
- Born: March 5, 2000 (age 26) New York City, New York, U.S.

2020 Indy Lights career
- Debut season: 2019
- Categorisation: FIA Silver
- Car number: 27
- Former teams: Andretti Autosport
- Starts: 30
- Wins: 1
- Poles: 2
- Fastest laps: 3
- Best finish: 5th in 2019

Robert Kwon Megennis (born March 5, 2000) is an American-British-Korean race car driver who has been active since 2015 starting his career in the F1600, later moving up to the USF2000 series, Pro Mazda, and Indy Lights. He previously competed in the Indian based MRF Challenge Championship across the 2017-18 Season. He currently races with Turner Motorsport in the IMSA Michelin Pilot Challenge, Grand Sport class.

== Racing record ==
=== Career summary ===
Season	Series	Team	Races	Wins	Poles	F/Laps	Podiums	Points	Position
2015	F1600 Championship Series	Team Pelfrey	19	0	1	2	8	521	8th
2016	USF2000 National Championship	Team Pelfrey	16	0	0	0	2	224	6th
2017	USF2000 National Championship	Team Pelfrey	14	1	1	0	1	173	6th
2017	Pro Mazda Championship	Team Pelfrey	1	0	0	0	0	21	13th
2017–18	MRF Challenge Formula 2000 Championship	MRF Racing	16	0	0	0	0	54	10th
2018	Pro Mazda Championship	Juncos Racing	16	0	0	1	6	274	5th
2019	Indy Lights	Andretti Autosport	18	1	2	2	5	355	5th
2020	European Le Mans Series - LMP3	RLR MSport	2	0	0	0	0	18	19th
2020	Intercontinental GT Challenge	Racers Edge Motorsports	1	0	0	0	0	6	18th
2021	Indy Lights	Andretti Autosport	20	0	0	1	3	307	6th
2021	IMSA SportsCar Championship - GTD	Vasser Sullivan Racing	5	0	0	0	1	1042	25th
2022	IMSA SportsCar Championship - GTD	CarBahn with Peregrine Racing	11	0	0	0	2	2651	7th
2023	Michelin Pilot Challenge - GS	Turner Motorsport	10	0	2	0	2	1800	13th
2023	Michelin Pilot Challenge - TCR	Deily Motorsports	1	0	0	0	0	170	38th
2023	IMSA SportsCar Championship - GTD	NTE Sport	1	0	0	0	0	120	69th
2024	Michelin Pilot Challenge - GS	Turner Motorsport	10	0	0	1	2	2360	5th
2024	24H Series - GT3	Optimum Motorsport							
2025	Michelin Pilot Challenge - GS	Czabok-Simpson Motorsport	10	0	0	0	0	1430	14th
2025	IMSA SportsCar Championship - GTD	Gradient Racing	5	0	0	0	0	1318	21st
2025	IMSA SportsCar Championship - GTD	Triarsi Competizione	1	0	0	0	0	1318	21st
2026	Michelin Pilot Challenge - GS	Random Vandals Racing	9	0	0	0	0	1380	25th
2026	IMSA SportsCar Championship - GTD	Triarsi Competizione	5	0	0	1	1	1264	26th

=== American open–wheel racing results ===
==== U.S. F2000 National Championship ====
Year	Team	1	2	3	4	5	6	7	8	9	10	11	12	13	14	15	16	Rank	Points
2016	Team Pelfrey	STP; 3	STP; 8	BAR; 12	BAR; 3	IMS; 8	IMS; 10	LOR; 6	ROA; 7	ROA; 11	TOR; 5	TOR; 5	MOH; 19	MOH; 4	MOH; 7	LAG; 8	LAG; 8	**6th**	**224**
2017	Team Pelfrey	STP; 1	STP; 19	BAR; 4	BAR; 6	IMS; DSQ	IMS; 7	ROA; 7	ROA; 15	IOW; 5	TOR; 13	TOR; 5	MOH; 17	MOH; 7	WGL; 10			6th	173

==== Pro Mazda Championship ====
Year	Team	1	2	3	4	5	6	7	8	9	10	11	12	13	14	15	16	Rank	Points
2017	Team Pelfrey	STP	STP	IMS	IMS	ROA	ROA	MOH	MOH	MOH	GMP	WGL; 12	WGL; DNS					13th	21
2018	Juncos Racing	STP; 3	STP; 16	BAR; 14	BAR; 6	IMS; 14	IMS; 8	LOR; 3	ROA; 8	ROA; 10	TOR; 12	TOR; 3	MOH; 3	MOH; 2	GMP; 2	POR; 5	POR; 7	5th	269

==== Indy Lights ====
Year	Team	1	2	3	4	5	6	7	8	9	10	11	12	13	14	15	16	17	18	19	20	Rank	Points
2019	Andretti Autosport	STP; 6	STP; 9	COA; 3	COA; 2	**IMS**; 1	IMS; 4	**INDY**; 8	RDA; 2	RDA; 6	TOR; 6	TOR; 5	MOH; 4	MOH; 9	GTW; 5	POR; 3	POR; 5	LAG; 3	LAG; 4			5th	355
2021	Andretti Autosport	ALA; 6	ALA; 13	STP; 4	STP; 7	IMS; 8	IMS; 7	DET; 8	DET; 8	RDA; 3	RDA; 2	MOH; 8	MOH; 7	GTW; 7	GTW; 7	POR; 5	POR; 5	LAG; 10	LAG; 6	MOH; 3	MOH; 9	7th	319

=== Complete European Le Mans Series results ===
(key) (Races in bold indicate pole position; results in italics indicate fastest lap)

Year	Entrant	Class	Chassis	Engine	1	2	3	4	5	Rank	Points
2020	RLR MSport	LMP3	Ligier JS P320	Nissan VK56DE 5.6L V8	LEC	SPA; 7	LEC; 4	MNZ	ALG	19th	18

=== Complete IMSA SportsCar Championship results ===
(key) (Races in bold indicate pole position; races in italics indicate fastest lap)

Year	Entrant	Class	Make	Engine	1	2	3	4	5	6	7	8	9	10	11	12	Rank	Points
2021	Vasser Sullivan Racing	GTD	Lexus RC F GT3	Lexus 5.0 L V8	DAY; 13	SEB; 6	MOH	DET	WGL; 11	WGL	LIM	ELK	LGA	LBH	VIR	PET; 3	25th	1042
2022	CarBahn with Peregrine Racing	GTD	Lamborghini Huracán GT3 Evo	Lamborghini 5.2 L V10	DAY; 17	SEB; 13	LBH; 11	LGA; 2	MOH; 4	DET; 6	WGL; 7	MOS	LIM; 3	ELK; 2	VIR; 11	PET; 15	7th	2651
2023	NTE Sport	GTD	Lamborghini Huracán GT3 Evo 2	Lamborghini 5.2 L V10	DAY; 20	SEB	LBH	LGA	WGL	MOS	LIM	ELK	VIR	IMS	PET		69th	120
2025	Gradient Racing	GTD	Ford Mustang GT3	Ford Coyote 5.4 L V8	DAY	SEB	LBH; 10	LGA; 14	WGL	MOS; 12	ELK; 12	VIR; 5	IMS				21st	1318
2025	Triarsi Competizione	GTD	Ferrari 296 GT3	Ferrari F163CE 3.0 L Turbo V6										PET; 14			21st	1318
2026	Triarsi Competizione	GTD	Ferrari 296 GT3 Evo	Ferrari F163CE 3.0 L Turbo V6	DAY; 7	SEB; 14	LBH	LGA	WGL; 8	MOS	ELK; 2	VIR	IMS	PET; 9			26th	1264

=== IMSA Michelin Pilot Challenge results ===
(key) (Races in bold indicate pole position; races in italics indicate fastest lap)

Year	Entrant	Class	Make	Engine	1	2	3	4	5	6	7	8	9	10	11	Rank	Points
2023	Turner Motorsport	GS	BMW M4 GT4 Gen II	BMW 3.0 L Twin-Turbo I6	DAY; 26	SEB; 2	LGA; 9	DET; 19	WGL; 2	MOS; DSQ#		ELK; 7	VIR; 12	IMS; 11	ATL; 24##	13th	1800
2023	Deily Motorsports	TCR	Hyundai Elantra N TCR	Hyundai 2.0 L Turbo							LIM; 14					38th	170
2024	Turner Motorsport	GS	BMW M4 GT4 Gen II	BMW S58B30T0 3.0 L Twin-Turbo I6	DAY; 4	SEB; 14	LGA; 9	MOH; 6	WGL; 2	MOS; 12	ELK; 9	VIR; 11	IMS; 3	ATL; 10		5th	2360
2025	Czabok-Simpson Motorsport	GS	Porsche 718 Cayman GT4 RS Clubsport	Porsche MDG 4.0 L Flat-6	DAY; 14	SEB; 18	LGA; 24	MOH; 14	WGL; 12	MOS; 13	ELK; 9	VIR; 24	IMS; 21	ATL; 18		14th	1430

^{#} Won race, but disqualified on post-race inspection and placed 24th. ^{##} Placed last in class for Min Drive Time violation.
