= 2022 Hyundai Monterey SportsCar Championship =

Sports car race in California

The layout of the WeatherTech Raceway Laguna Seca

The 2022 Hyundai Monterey SportsCar Championship was a sports car race held at WeatherTech Raceway Laguna Seca near Monterey, California on May 1, 2022. It was the fourth round of the 2022 IMSA SportsCar Championship and the second round of the 2022 WeatherTech Sprint Cup. Wayne Taylor Racing's No. 10 car piloted by Ricky Taylor and Filipe Albuquerque collected their first victory of the season.

== Background ==
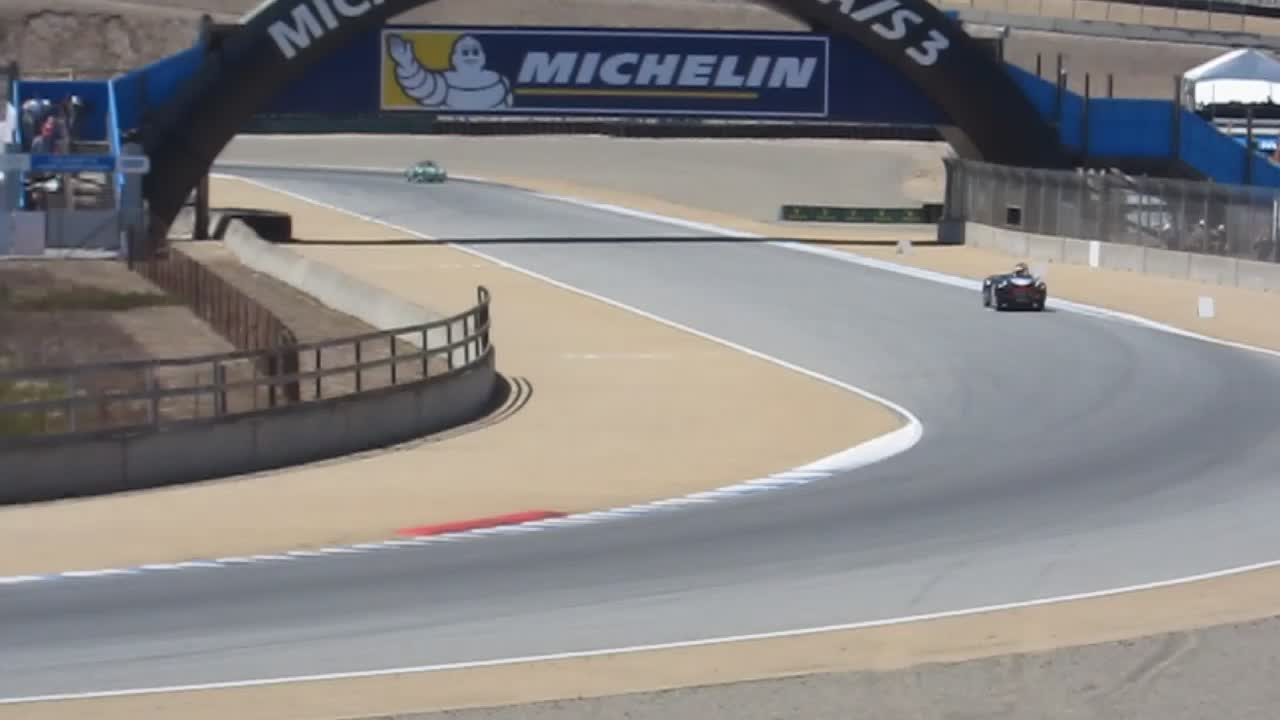
WeatherTech Raceway Laguna Seca, where the race was held.

International Motor Sports Association's (IMSA) president John Doonan confirmed the race was part of the schedule for the 2022 IMSA SportsCar Championship (IMSA SCC) in August 2021. It was the ninth consecutive year the event was held as part of the WeatherTech SportsCar Championship. The 2022 Hyundai Monterey SportsCar Championship was the fourth of twelve scheduled sports car races of 2022 by IMSA, and it was the second of eight rounds held as part of the WeatherTech Sprint Cup. The race was held at the eleven-turn 2.238 mi (3.602 km) WeatherTech Raceway Laguna Seca on May 1, 2022.

On April 21, 2022, IMSA released the latest technical bulletin outlining Balance of Performance for the event. In DPi, the Acura ARX-05 received a 10 kilogram weight break while the Cadillac DPi-V.R received a 10 kilogram weight increase. In GTD Pro and GTD, the Chevrolet Corvette C8.R GTD received a 20 kilogram weight increase. The BMW M4 GT3 received a 6 horsepower increase.

Before the race, Alex Lynn and Earl Bamber led the DPi Drivers' Championship with 1005 points, 3 points clear of Tristan Vautier and Richard Westbrook in second followed by Tom Blomqvist and Oliver Jarvis in third with 973 points. In LMP2, Ben Keating, Scott Huffaker, and Mikkel Jensen led the Drivers' Championship with a 37 point advantage over Frits van Eerd and Giedo van der Garde. With 990 points, Antonio García and Jordan Taylor led the GTD Pro Drivers' Championship by 30 points over Matt Campbell and Mathieu Jaminet in second followed by Ben Barnicoat and Jack Hawksworth in third with 919 points. With 672 points, Stevan McAleer and Mike Skeen led the GTD Drivers' Championship, 53 points ahead of Luís Pérez Companc, Simon Mann, and Toni Vilander in second followed by Ryan Hardwick, Jan Heylen, and Zacharie Robichon in third with 615 points. Cadillac, Chevrolet, and Porsche were leading their respective Manufacturers' Championships, while Cadillac Racing, PR1/Mathiasen Motorsports, Corvette Racing, and Gilbert Korthoff Motorsports each led their own Teams' Championships.

=== Entries ===
A total of 32 cars took part in the event, split across four classes. 6 were entered in DPi, 6 in LMP2, 6 in GTD Pro, and 14 in GTD. In LMP2, Patrick Kelly joined Josh Pierson in the PR1/Mathiasen Motorsports No. 52 entry. In GTD, Gradient Racing and Crucial Motorsports skipped after competing at Long Beach. NTE Sport returned after being forced to withdraw at the previous race. Marco Holzer joined NTE Sport making his first start in the IMSA SportsCar Championship since 2015. Dirk Müller subbed for Mike Skeen, who tested positive for COVID-19, in the Team Korthoff Motorsports No. 32.

== Practice ==
There were two practice sessions preceding the start of the race on Sunday; one on Friday and one on Saturday. The first session on Friday afternoon ran for 90 minutes while the second session on Saturday morning lasted 105 minutes.

== Qualifying ==
Saturday's afternoon qualifying was broken into two sessions, with one session for the DPi and LMP2, GTD Pro and GTD classes, which lasted for 15 minutes each, and a ten minute interval between the sessions. The rules dictated that all teams nominated a driver to qualify their cars, with the Pro-Am (LMP2/GTD) classes requiring a Bronze/Silver Rated Driver to qualify the car. The competitors' fastest lap times determined the starting order. IMSA then arranged the grid to put DPis ahead of the LMP2, GTD Pro, and GTD cars.

=== Qualifying results ===
Pole positions in each class are indicated in bold and by ‡.

Pos.	Class	PIC	No.	Team	Driver	Time	Gap	Grid
1	**DPi**	**1**	**10**	**(United States) WTR - Konica Minolta Acura**	**(United States)** Ricky Taylor	**1:13.924**	-	1‡
2	DPi	2	60	(United States) Meyer Shank Racing with Curb-Agajanian	(United Kingdom) Oliver Jarvis	1:14.013	+0.089	2
3	DPi	3	02	(United States) Cadillac Racing	(United Kingdom) Alex Lynn	1:14.072	+0.148	3
4	DPi	4	01	(United States) Cadillac Racing	(France) Sébastien Bourdais	1:14.517	+0.593	4
5	DPi	5	5	(United States) JDC-Miller MotorSports	(France) Tristan Vautier	1:14.877	+0.953	5
6	DPi	6	31	(United States) Whelen Engineering Racing	(United States) Tristan Nunez	1:15.576	+1.652	6
7	**LMP2**	**1**	**11**	**(United States) PR1/Mathiasen Motorsports**	**(United States) Steven Thomas**	**1:17.571**	**+3.647**	7‡
8	LMP2	2	52	(United States) PR1/Mathiasen Motorsports	(United States) Patrick Kelly	1:17.628	+3.704	8
9	LMP2	3	81	(United States) DragonSpeed - 10 Star	(Sweden) Henrik Hedman	1:18.267	+4.343	9
10	LMP2	4	20	(Denmark) High Class Racing	(Denmark) Dennis Andersen	1:18.747	+4.823	10
11	LMP2	5	8	(United States) Tower Motorsport	(Canada) John Farano	1:19.551	+5.627	11
12	LMP2	6	18	(United States) Era Motorsport	(United States) Dwight Merriman	1:20.614	+6.690	12
13	**GTD Pro**	**1**	**9**	**(Canada) Pfaff Motorsports**	**(France) Mathieu Jaminet**	**1:23.142**	**+9.218**	13‡
14	GTD Pro	2	79	(United States) WeatherTech Racing	(Spain) Daniel Juncadella	1:23.164	+9.240	14
15	GTD Pro	3	23	(United States) Heart of Racing Team	(Spain) Alex Riberas	1:23.368	+9.444	15
16	**GTD**	**1**	**57**	**(United States) Winward Racing**	**(United States) Russell Ward**	**1:23.567**	**+9.643**	16‡
17	GTD Pro	4	25	(United States) BMW M Team RLL	(United States) John Edwards	1:23.740	+9.816	17
18	GTD	2	42	(United States) NTE Sport/SSR	(United States) Jaden Conwright	1:23.777	+9.853	18
19	GTD	3	96	(United States) Turner Motorsport	(United States) Robby Foley	1:23.821	+9.897	19
20	GTD	4	27	(United States) Heart of Racing Team	(Canada) Roman De Angelis	1:23.852	+9.928	20
21	GTD	5	39	(United States) CarBahn with Peregrine Racing	(United States) Robert Megennis	1:23.881	+9.957	21
22	GTD Pro	5	14	(United States) Vasser Sullivan Racing	(United Kingdom) Jack Hawksworth	1:23.953	+10.029	22
23	GTD	6	1	(United States) Paul Miller Racing	(United States) Madison Snow	1:24.121	+10.197	23
24	GTD	7	51	(Philippines) RWR Eurasia Motorsport	(Australia) Aidan Read	1:24.126	+10.202	24
25	GTD Pro	6	3	(United States) Corvette Racing	(United States) Jordan Taylor	1:24.160	+10.236	25
26	GTD	8	32	(United States) Team Korthoff Motorsports	(United Kingdom) Stevan McAleer	1:24.162	+10.238	26
27	GTD	9	12	(United States) Vasser Sullivan Racing	(United States) Frankie Montecalvo	1:24.444	+10.520	32^{1}
28	GTD	10	28	(United States) Alegra Motorsports	(United States) Michael de Quesada	1:24.471	+10.547	27
29	GTD	11	16	(United States) Wright Motorsports	(United States) Ryan Hardwick	1:24.637	+10.713	28
30	GTD	12	70	(United Kingdom) Inception Racing with Optimum Motorsport	(United States) Brendan Iribe	1:24.948	+11.024	29
31	GTD	13	99	(United States) Team Hardpoint	(United States) Rob Ferriol	1:25.152	+11.228	30
32	GTD	14	34	(United States) GMG Racing	(United States) Kyle Washington	1:27.310	+13.386	31

- ^{1} The No. 12 Vasser Sullivan Racing entry was moved to the back of the GTD field as per Article 40.1.4 of the Sporting regulations (Change of starting tires).

== Race ==
=== Post-Race ===
As a result of finishing in second place, Blomqvist and Jarvis took the lead of the DPi Drivers' Championship. Filipe Albuquerque and Ricky Taylor advanced from fourth to second while Bamber and Lynn dropped from first to fourth. Dalziel and Merriman took the lead of the LMP2 Drivers' Championship with 675 points while Farano and Delétraz advanced from eighth to second. Campbell and Jaminet retook the lead of the GTD Pro Drivers' Championship with 1345 points while Antonio García and Jordan Taylor dropped from first to second. Hardwick and Heylen took the lead of the GTD Drivers' Championship with 985 points while McAleer dropped from first to second. Auberlen and Foley advanced from tenth to third while Megennis and Jeff Westphal jumped from seventeenth to fifth. Acura and Porsche became the leaders of their respective Manufactures' Championships while PR1/Mathiasen Motorsports continued to top the LMP2 Teams' Championship. Meyer Shank Racing, Pfaff Motorsports, and Wright Motorsports became the leaders of their respective class Teams' Championships with eight rounds remaining.

=== Race results ===
Class winners are denoted in bold and ‡.

Pos	Class	PIC	No.	Team	Drivers	Chassis	Laps	Time/Retired
Pos	Class	PIC	No.	Team	Drivers	Engine	Laps	Time/Retired
1	**DPi**	**1**	**10**	**(United States) WTR - Konica Minolta Acura**	**(United States) Ricky Taylor (Portugal) Filipe Albuquerque**	**Acura ARX-05**	**117**	**2:41:05.230 ‡**
1	**DPi**	**1**	**10**	**(United States) WTR - Konica Minolta Acura**	**(United States) Ricky Taylor (Portugal) Filipe Albuquerque**	**Acura AR35TT 3.5 L Turbo V6**	**117**	**2:41:05.230 ‡**
2	DPi	2	60	(United States) Meyer Shank Racing with Curb-Agajanian	(United Kingdom) Oliver Jarvis (United Kingdom) Tom Blomqvist	Acura ARX-05	117	+1.080
2	DPi	2	60	(United States) Meyer Shank Racing with Curb-Agajanian	(United Kingdom) Oliver Jarvis (United Kingdom) Tom Blomqvist	Acura AR35TT 3.5 L Turbo V6	117	+1.080
3	DPi	3	31	(United States) Whelen Engineering Racing	(United States) Tristan Nunez (Brazil) Pipo Derani	Cadillac DPi-V.R	117	+26.744
3	DPi	3	31	(United States) Whelen Engineering Racing	(United States) Tristan Nunez (Brazil) Pipo Derani	Cadillac 5.5 L V8	117	+26.744
4	DPi	4	5	(United States) JDC-Miller MotorSports	(France) Tristan Vautier (United Kingdom) Richard Westbrook	Cadillac DPi-V.R	117	+33.375
4	DPi	4	5	(United States) JDC-Miller MotorSports	(France) Tristan Vautier (United Kingdom) Richard Westbrook	Cadillac 5.5 L V8	117	+33.375
5	DPi	5	02	(United States) Cadillac Racing	(United Kingdom) Alex Lynn (New Zealand) Earl Bamber	Cadillac DPi-V.R	116	+1 lap
5	DPi	5	02	(United States) Cadillac Racing	(United Kingdom) Alex Lynn (New Zealand) Earl Bamber	Cadillac 5.5 L V8	116	+1 lap
6	**LMP2**	**1**	**8**	**(United States) Tower Motorsport**	**(Canada) John Farano (Switzerland) Louis Deletraz**	**Oreca 07**	**114**	**+3 laps‡**
6	**LMP2**	**1**	**8**	**(United States) Tower Motorsport**	**(Canada) John Farano (Switzerland) Louis Deletraz**	**Gibson GK428 4.2 L V8**	**114**	**+3 laps‡**
7	LMP2	2	18	(United States) Era Motorsport	(United States) Dwight Merriman (United Kingdom) Ryan Dalziel	Oreca 07	114	+3 Laps
7	LMP2	2	18	(United States) Era Motorsport	(United States) Dwight Merriman (United Kingdom) Ryan Dalziel	Gibson GK428 4.2 L V8	114	+3 Laps
8	LMP2	3	81	(United States) DragonSpeed - 10 Star	(Sweden) Henrik Hedman (Colombia) Juan Pablo Montoya	Oreca 07	113	+4 Laps
8	LMP2	3	81	(United States) DragonSpeed - 10 Star	(Sweden) Henrik Hedman (Colombia) Juan Pablo Montoya	Gibson GK428 4.2 L V8	113	+4 Laps
9	LMP2	4	52	(United States) PR1/Mathiasen Motorsports	(United States) Josh Pierson (United States) Patrick Kelly	Oreca 07	113	+4 Laps
9	LMP2	4	52	(United States) PR1/Mathiasen Motorsports	(United States) Josh Pierson (United States) Patrick Kelly	Gibson GK428 4.2 L V8	113	+4 Laps
10	LMP2	5	11	(United States) PR1/Mathiasen Motorsports	(United States) Steven Thomas (United States) Jonathan Bomarito	Oreca 07	113	+4 Laps
10	LMP2	5	11	(United States) PR1/Mathiasen Motorsports	(United States) Steven Thomas (United States) Jonathan Bomarito	Gibson GK428 4.2 L V8	113	+4 Laps
11	LMP2	6	20	(Denmark) High Class Racing	(Denmark) Dennis Andersen (Denmark) Anders Fjordbach	Oreca 07	113	+4 Laps
11	LMP2	6	20	(Denmark) High Class Racing	(Denmark) Dennis Andersen (Denmark) Anders Fjordbach	Gibson GK428 4.2 L V8	113	+4 Laps
12	**GTD Pro**	**1**	**9**	**(Canada) Pfaff Motorsports**	**(France) Mathieu Jaminet (Australia) Matt Campbell**	**Porsche 911 GT3 R**	**107**	**+10 Laps‡**
12	**GTD Pro**	**1**	**9**	**(Canada) Pfaff Motorsports**	**(France) Mathieu Jaminet (Australia) Matt Campbell**	**Porsche 4.0 L Flat-6**	**107**	**+10 Laps‡**
13	GTD Pro	2	14	(United States) Vasser Sullivan Racing	(United Kingdom) Jack Hawksworth (United Kingdom) Ben Barnicoat	Lexus RC F GT3	107	+10 Laps
13	GTD Pro	2	14	(United States) Vasser Sullivan Racing	(United Kingdom) Jack Hawksworth (United Kingdom) Ben Barnicoat	Toyota 2UR 5.0 L V8	107	+10 Laps
14	GTD Pro	3	25	(United States) BMW M Team RLL	(United States) John Edwards (United States) Connor De Phillippi	BMW M4 GT3	107	+10 Laps
14	GTD Pro	3	25	(United States) BMW M Team RLL	(United States) John Edwards (United States) Connor De Phillippi	BMW S58B30T0 3.0 L Twin Turbo I6	107	+10 Laps
15	GTD Pro	4	3	(United States) Corvette Racing	(United States) Jordan Taylor (Spain) Antonio Garcia	Chevrolet Corvette C8.R GTD	107	+10 Laps
15	GTD Pro	4	3	(United States) Corvette Racing	(United States) Jordan Taylor (Spain) Antonio Garcia	Chevrolet 5.5 L V8	107	+10 Laps
16	**GTD**	**1**	**16**	**(United States) Wright Motorsports**	**(United States) Ryan Hardwick (Belgium) Jan Heylen**	**Porsche 911 GT3 R**	**107**	**+10 Laps‡**
16	**GTD**	**1**	**16**	**(United States) Wright Motorsports**	**(United States) Ryan Hardwick (Belgium) Jan Heylen**	**Porsche 4.0 L Flat-6**	**107**	**+10 Laps‡**
17	GTD	2	39	(United States) CarBahn with Peregrine Racing	(United States) Robert Megennis (United States) Jeff Westphal	Lamborghini Huracán GT3 Evo	107	+10 Laps
17	GTD	2	39	(United States) CarBahn with Peregrine Racing	(United States) Robert Megennis (United States) Jeff Westphal	Lamborghini 5.2 L V10	107	+10 Laps
18	GTD	3	96	(United States) Turner Motorsport	(United States) Robby Foley (United States) Bill Auberlen	BMW M4 GT3	107	+10 Laps
18	GTD	3	96	(United States) Turner Motorsport	(United States) Robby Foley (United States) Bill Auberlen	BMW S58B30T0 3.0 L Twin Turbo I6	107	+10 Laps
19	GTD Pro	5	23	(United States) Heart of Racing Team	(Spain) Alex Riberas (United Kingdom) Ross Gunn	Aston Martin Vantage AMR GT3	107	+10 Laps
19	GTD Pro	5	23	(United States) Heart of Racing Team	(Spain) Alex Riberas (United Kingdom) Ross Gunn	Aston Martin 4.0 L Turbo V8	107	+10 Laps
20	GTD	4	1	(United States) Paul Miller Racing	(United States) Madison Snow (United States) Bryan Sellers	BMW M4 GT3	107	+10 Laps
20	GTD	4	1	(United States) Paul Miller Racing	(United States) Madison Snow (United States) Bryan Sellers	BMW S58B30T0 3.0 L Twin Turbo I6	107	+10 Laps
21	GTD	5	32	(United States) Team Korthoff Motorsports	(United Kingdom) Stevan McAleer (Germany) Dirk Muller	Mercedes-AMG GT3 Evo	107	+10 laps
21	GTD	5	32	(United States) Team Korthoff Motorsports	(United Kingdom) Stevan McAleer (Germany) Dirk Muller	Mercedes-AMG M159 6.2 L V8	107	+10 laps
22	GTD	6	42	(United States) NTE Sport/SSR	(United States) Jaden Conwright (Germany) Marco Holzer	Lamborghini Huracán GT3 Evo	107	+10 Laps
22	GTD	6	42	(United States) NTE Sport/SSR	(United States) Jaden Conwright (Germany) Marco Holzer	Lamborghini 5.2 L V10	107	+10 Laps
23	GTD Pro	6	79	(United States) WeatherTech Racing	(Spain) Daniel Juncadella (United States) Cooper MacNeil	Mercedes-AMG GT3 Evo	107	+10 laps
23	GTD Pro	6	79	(United States) WeatherTech Racing	(Spain) Daniel Juncadella (United States) Cooper MacNeil	Mercedes-AMG M159 6.2 L V8	107	+10 laps
24	GTD	7	27	(United States) Heart of Racing Team	(Canada) Roman De Angelis (Belgium) Maxime Martin	Aston Martin Vantage AMR GT3	107	+10 Laps
24	GTD	7	27	(United States) Heart of Racing Team	(Canada) Roman De Angelis (Belgium) Maxime Martin	Aston Martin 4.0 L Turbo V8	107	+10 Laps
25	GTD	8	12	(United States) Vasser Sullivan Racing	(United States) Frankie Montecalvo (United States) Aaron Telitz	Lexus RC F GT3	107	+10 Laps
25	GTD	8	12	(United States) Vasser Sullivan Racing	(United States) Frankie Montecalvo (United States) Aaron Telitz	Toyota 2UR 5.0 L V8	107	+10 Laps
26	GTD	9	28	(United States) Alegra Motorsports	(United States) Michael de Quesada (Canada) Daniel Morad	Mercedes-AMG GT3 Evo	106	+11 laps
26	GTD	9	28	(United States) Alegra Motorsports	(United States) Michael de Quesada (Canada) Daniel Morad	Mercedes-AMG M159 6.2 L V8	106	+11 laps
27	GTD	10	99	(United States) Team Hardpoint	(United States) Rob Ferriol (United Kingdom) Katherine Legge	Porsche 911 GT3 R	106	+11 Laps
27	GTD	10	99	(United States) Team Hardpoint	(United States) Rob Ferriol (United Kingdom) Katherine Legge	Porsche 4.0 L Flat-6	106	+11 Laps
28	GTD	11	34	(United States) GMG Racing	(United States) Kyle Washington (United States) James Sofronas	Porsche 911 GT3 R	105	+12 Laps
28	GTD	11	34	(United States) GMG Racing	(United States) Kyle Washington (United States) James Sofronas	Porsche 4.0 L Flat-6	105	+12 Laps
29	GTD	12	51	(Philippines) RWR Eurasia Motorsport	(Australia) Aidan Read (United States) Ryan Eversley	Acura NSX GT3 Evo22	103	+14 Laps
29	GTD	12	51	(Philippines) RWR Eurasia Motorsport	(Australia) Aidan Read (United States) Ryan Eversley	Acura 3.5 L Turbo V6	103	+14 Laps
30 DNF	GTD	13	70	(United Kingdom) Inception Racing	(United States) Brendan Iribe (Denmark) Frederik Schandorff	McLaren 720S GT3	45	Diffuser
30 DNF	GTD	13	70	(United Kingdom) Inception Racing	(United States) Brendan Iribe (Denmark) Frederik Schandorff	McLaren M840T 4.0L Turbo V8	45	Diffuser
31 DNF	GTD	14	57	(United Kingdom) Winward Racing	(United States) Russell Ward (United Kingdom) Philip Ellis	Mercedes-AMG GT3 Evo	21	Accident
31 DNF	GTD	14	57	(United Kingdom) Winward Racing	(United States) Russell Ward (United Kingdom) Philip Ellis	Mercedes-AMG M159 6.2 L V8	21	Accident
32 DNF	DPi	6	01	(United States) Cadillac Racing	(France) Sebastien Bourdais (Netherlands) Renger van der Zande	Cadillac DPi-V.R	10	Electrical
32 DNF	DPi	6	01	(United States) Cadillac Racing	(France) Sebastien Bourdais (Netherlands) Renger van der Zande	Cadillac 5.5 L V8	10	Electrical

== Standings after the race ==
DPi Drivers' Championship standings
Pos.	+/–	Driver	Points
1	2	(United Kingdom) Tom Blomqvist (United Kingdom) Oliver Jarvis	1325
2	2	(Portugal) Filipe Albuquerque (United States) Ricky Taylor	1325
3	1	(France) Tristan Vautier (United Kingdom) Richard Westbrook	1308
4	3	(United Kingdom) Alex Lynn (New Zealand) Earl Bamber	1295
5	1	(Brazil) Pipo Derani (United States) Tristan Nunez	1249

LMP2 Drivers' Championship standings
Pos.	+/–	Driver	Points
1	2	(United Kingdom) Ryan Dalziel (United States) Dwight Merriman	675
2	6	(Canada) John Farano (Switzerland) Louis Delétraz	642
3	1	(United States) Josh Pierson	615
4		(United States) Steven Thomas (United States) Jonathan Bomarito	598
5	4	(Colombia) Juan Pablo Montoya (Sweden) Henrik Hedman	592

LMP3 Drivers' Championship standings
Pos.	+/–	Driver	Points
1		(Portugal) João Barbosa (United States) Lance Willsey (Denmark) Malthe Jakobsen	374
2		(United States) Ari Balogh (United States) Dakota Dickerson (Canada) Garett Grist	343
3		(United States) Daniel Goldburg (Sweden) Rasmus Lindh (Australia) Cameron Shields	326
4		(Germany) Lars Kern (Canada) Kuno Wittmer (Canada) Orey Fidani	302
5		(United States) Jon Bennett (United States) Colin Braun (United States) George Kurtz	285

GTD Pro Drivers' Championship standings
Pos.	+/–	Driver	Points
1	1	(Australia) Matt Campbell (France) Mathieu Jaminet	1345
2	1	(Spain) Antonio García (United States) Jordan Taylor	1295
3		(United Kingdom) Ben Barnicoat (United Kingdom) Jack Hawksworth	1265
4		(United States) Cooper MacNeil	1112
5		(United Kingdom) Ross Gunn (Spain) Alex Riberas	1106

GTD Drivers' Championship standings
Pos.	+/–	Driver	Points
1	2	(United States) Ryan Hardwick (Belgium) Jan Heylen	985
2	1	(United Kingdom) Stevan McAleer	955
3	7	(United States) Bill Auberlen (United States) Robby Foley	783
4	3	(United States) Brendan Iribe	743
5	12	(United States) Robert Megennis (United States) Jeff Westphal	709

- Note: Only the top five positions are included for all sets of standings.

DPi Teams' Championship standings
Pos.	+/–	Team	Points
1	2	(United States) #60 Meyer Shank Racing w/ Curb-Agajanian	1325
2	2	(United States) #10 WTR - Konica Minolta Acura	1325
3	1	(United States) #5 JDC-Miller MotorSports	1308
4	3	(United States) #02 Cadillac Racing	1295
5	1	(United States) #31 Whelen Engineering Racing	1249

LMP2 Teams' Championship standings
Pos.	+/–	Team	Points
1		(United States) #52 PR1/Mathiasen Motorsports	697
2	1	(United States) #18 Era Motorsport	675
3	4	(United States) #8 Tower Motorsport	642
4		(United States) #11 PR1/Mathiasen Motorsports	598
5	3	(United States) #81 DragonSpeed USA	592

LMP3 Teams' Championship standings
Pos.	+/–	Team	Points
1		(United States) #33 Sean Creech Motorsport	374
2		(United States) #30 Jr III Motorsports	343
3		(United States) #38 Performance Tech Motorsports	326
4		(Canada) #13 AWA	302
5		(United States) #54 CORE Autosport	285

GTD Pro Teams' Championship standings
Pos.	+/–	Team	Points
1	1	(Canada) #9 Pfaff Motorsports	1345
2	1	(United States) #3 Corvette Racing	1295
3		(United States) #14 Vasser Sullivan Racing	1265
4		(United States) #79 WeatherTech Racing	1112
5		(United States) #23 Heart of Racing Team	1106

GTD Teams' Championship standings
Pos.	+/–	Team	Points
1	2	(United States) #16 Wright Motorsports	985
2	1	(United States) #32 Gilbert Korthoff Motorsports	955
3	6	(United States) #96 Turner Motorsport	783
4	3	(United Kingdom) #70 Inception Racing with Optimum Motorsport	743
5	9	(United States) #39 CarBahn with Peregrine Racing	709

- Note: Only the top five positions are included for all sets of standings.

DPi Manufacturers' Championship standings
Pos.	+/–	Manufacturer	Points
1	1	(Japan) Acura	1474
2	1	(United States) Cadillac	1474

GTD Pro Manufacturers' Championship standings
Pos.	+/–	Manufacturer	Points
1	1	(Germany) Porsche	1345
2	1	(United States) Chevrolet	1305
3		(Japan) Lexus	1295
4		(Germany) Mercedes-AMG	1220
5	1	(Germany) BMW	1180

GTD Manufacturers' Championship standings
Pos.	+/–	Manufacturer	Points
1	2	(Germany) Porsche	1024
2		(Germany) Mercedes-AMG	998
3	1	(United Kingdom) Aston Martin	916
4	2	(Germany) BMW	904
5	3	(Italy) Lamborghini	873

- Note: Only the top five positions are included for all sets of standings.

IMSA SportsCar Championship
Previous race: 2022 Grand Prix of Long Beach	2022 season	Next race: 2022 Lexus Grand Prix at Mid-Ohio
