= Adrian Carrio =

American race car driver

Adrian James "Ace" Carrio (born January 12, 1989) is an American race car driver from Monument, Colorado.

Carrio was born in Glendora, California. He began go-karting at the age of eight, winning several national championships. Carrio stepped up to cars in 2004, finishing second in the Formula TR 2000 Championship. In 2005, he moved up to the competitive Star Mazda series and won the series title in 2006 with two wins and six pole positions. For 2007, Carrio moved to the Champ Car Atlantic series, driving for Genoa Racing. The season was a struggle, with Carrio finishing 18th in points with only two top-ten finishes, a sixth at San Jose and a seventh at Edmonton. Carrio has not participated in a professional race since.

Sporting positions
Preceded by Raphael Matos	Star Mazda Championship Champion; 2006	Succeeded by Dane Cameron
