= Jordan Cane =

British racing driver (born 2001)

- Nationality: (United Kingdom) British
- Born: 23 May 2001 (age 25) King's Lynn, Norfolk, England

F1600 Championship Series career
- Debut season: 2015

Jordan Cane (born 23 May 2001) is a British former racing driver from West Sussex, England. Making his racing debut in the United States in 2015, he was the youngest active Formula Car racer and was the youngest to score a point in the F1600 Championship Series. Cane retired from racing in July 2018, citing budgetary concerns.

== Career ==
Cane attended the Goodwood Festival of Speed, where he became interested in motorsports and asked his father to help him make his way into the industry. From 2012 to 2014 Jordan was competitively karting. In Jordan’s first karting experience, at Thruxton Circuit, he broke the track record after just four sessions. In those two years, Cane received awards such as Best Novice and entered into the British Super One Championship, where he placed tenth. Around that same time, he found himself traveling to America to try his hand at racing cars which led to attending the Skip Barber Racing School where he completed a 3-Day Racing School and an Advanced Racing School at Lime Rock Park.

For the 2015 season, Cane joined Team Pelfrey for the F1600 Championship Series. His first win as the youngest British driver in open-wheel racing took place at Mid-Ohio Sports Car Course on 5 July 2015. Continuing with the momentum, Cane had from Mid-Ohio Sports Car Course, he won two more races and placed third in the first of three at Pittsburgh International Race Complex. The next round took F1600 Championship Series to New Jersey Motorsports Park where Cane took home another victory and two more podiums, ending the weekend with his fourth win of the season and two-second-place finishes. He then went on to sweeping the final weekend back at Pittsburgh International Race Complex, taking all three wins which placed him fourth overall in the championship, despite missing the first six races due to age restrictions.

== Racing record ==
=== Career summary ===
Season	Series	Team	Races	Wins	Poles	F/Laps	Podiums	Points	Position
2015	F1600 Championship Series	Team Pelfrey	15	7	0	3	10	584	4th
2016	U.S. F2000 National Championship	Team Pelfrey	6	0	0	0	1	121	13th
2016	U.S. F2000 National Championship	Cape Motorsports Wayne Taylor Racing	7	0	0	0	0	121	13th
2017	BRDC British Formula 3 Championship	Douglas Motorsport	18	3	0	0	5	288	8th
2018	BRDC British Formula 3 Championship	Douglas Motorsport	11	0	0	0	2	159	14th

=== F1600 Championship Series ===
Year	Team	1	2	3	4	5	6	7	8	9	10	11	12	13	14	15	16	17	18	19	20	Rank	Points
2015	Team Pelfrey	ATL	ATL	ATL	WGL	WGL	WGL	VIR; DNS	VIR; 8	VIR; 8	MOH; 6	MOH; 1	MOH; 6	PIT; 3	PIT; 1	PIT; 1	NJ; 1	NJ; 2	NJ; 2	PIT; 1	PIT; 1	4th	584

=== U.S. F2000 National Championship ===
Year	Team	1	2	3	4	5	6	7	8	9	10	11	12	13	14	15	16	Rank	Points
2016	Team Pelfrey	STP; 25	STP; 3	BAR; 6	BAR; 19	IMS; 10	IMS; 21	LOR										13th	121
2016	Cape Motorsports Wayne Taylor Racing								ROA; 21	ROA; 6	TOR; 9	TOR; 16	MOH; 8	MOH; 9	MOH; 14	LAG	LAG	13th	121
