= 2011 Formula Future Fiat season =

2011 Formula Future Fiat

Seasons
- ← 2010 none →

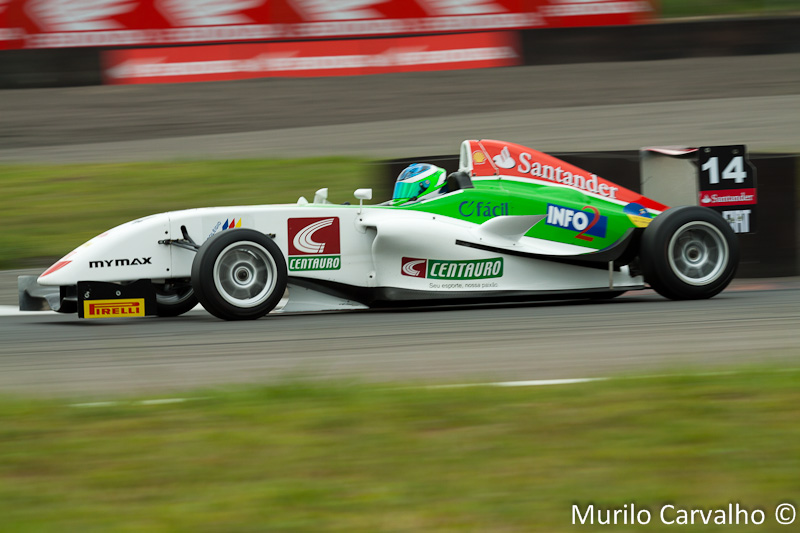
Guilherme Silva in the final race of 2011 season at Velopark.

The 2011 Formula Future Fiat season was the second Formula Future Fiat season. It began on 27 March at Londrina and concluded on October 30 at Velopark, after 12 races to be held at six meetings.

Guilherme Silva won the championship, taking two victories and four second places for a championship-winning margin of 7 points over runner-up Luir Miranda. Miranda talking two wins at Brasilía and Londrina. John Louis finished the season in third place, taking victories at first and second meetings at Interlagos, Londrina and Curitiba. Guilherme Salas and Victor Franzoni earned two wins each.

== Drivers ==
All cars are powered by FPT engines and use Signatech chassis. All drivers were Brazilian-registered.

No.	Driver	Rounds
1	John Louis	All
2	Eduardo Banzolli	All
5	Lucas de la Vega	1–5
6	Ricardo Landucci	1–4
9	Felipe Donato	All
11	André Predalli	1
13	Johilton Pavlak	1–3
14	Guilherme Silva	All
16	Francisco Alfaya	2
17	Guilherme Salas	All
23	Victor Franzoni	All
42	Luir Miranda	All

== Race calendar and results ==
All races were held in Brazil.

Round		Circuit	Date	Pole position	Fastest lap	Winning driver
1	R1	Autódromo José Carlos Pace	May 7	John Louis	Victor Franzoni	John Louis
1	R2	Autódromo José Carlos Pace	May 8		Felipe Donato	Victor Franzoni
2	R1	Autódromo Internacional Nelson Piquet	June 11	Guilherme Silva	Guilherme Silva	Guilherme Silva
2	R2	Autódromo Internacional Nelson Piquet	June 12		John Louis	Luir Miranda
3	R1	Autódromo Internacional Ayrton Senna	July 16	John Louis	Victor Franzoni	John Louis
3	R2	Autódromo Internacional Ayrton Senna	July 17		Victor Franzoni	Luir Miranda
4	R1	Autódromo José Carlos Pace	August 13	Luir Miranda	John Louis	Guilherme Salas
4	R2	Autódromo José Carlos Pace	August 14		Eduardo Banzoli	John Louis
5	R1	Autódromo Internacional de Curitiba	September 24	Lucas de la Vega	Victor Franzoni	Victor Franzoni
5	R2	Autódromo Internacional de Curitiba	September 25		Victor Franzoni	John Louis
6	R1	Velopark, Nova Santa Rita	October 29	John Louis	Luir Miranda	Guilherme Salas
6	R2	Velopark, Nova Santa Rita	October 30		Victor Franzoni	Guilherme Silva

== Championship Standings ==
- Points were awarded as follows:

Pos	1	2	3	4	5	6	7	8	9	10
Race 1	20	14	12	10	8	6	4	3	2	1
Race 2	15	12	10	8	6	4	2	1	0	

Pos	Driver	INT		BRA		LON		INT		CUR		VEL		Points
1	Guilherme Silva	3	2	**1**	2	8	6	3	4	2	Ret	2	1	123
2	Luir Miranda	2	3	6	1	2	1	**Ret**	NC	3	4	4	2	116
3	John Louis	**1**	Ret	2	7	**1**	5	2	1	Ret	1	**6**	Ret	112
4	Guilherme Salas	4	6	7	4	Ret	9	1	5	6	2	1	4	98
5	Victor Franzoni	7	1	4	DSQ	3	8	7	Ret	1	3	3	3	98
6	Felipe Donato	11	7	3	5	4	10	5	2	5	Ret	5	5	72
7	Eduardo Banzolli	6	Ret	9	6	6	3	4	3	4	5	Ret	6	68
8	Lucas de la Vega	10	5	5	DSQ	5	7	6	6	**7**	6			43
9	Johilton Pavlak	8	8	8	3	9	2							31
10	Ricardo Landucci	9	Ret	10	8	7	4	Ret	7					18
11	André Predalli	5	4											16
	Francisco Alfaya			DNS	DNS									0
Pos	Driver	INT		BRA		LON		INT		CUR		VEL		Points

Colour	Result
Gold	Winner
Silver	Second place
Bronze	Third place
Green	Points classification
Blue	Non-points classification
Blue	Non-classified finish (NC)
Purple	Retired, not classified (Ret)
Red	Did not qualify (DNQ)
Red	Did not pre-qualify (DNPQ)
Black	Disqualified (DSQ)
White	Did not start (DNS)
White	Withdrew (WD)
White	Race cancelled (C)
Blank	Did not practice (DNP)
Blank	Did not arrive (DNA)
Blank	Excluded (EX)

**Bold** – Pole
Italics – Fastest Lap
