= 2022 Grand Prix of Long Beach =

Sports car race in California

The layout of the Long Beach Street Circuit

The 2022 Grand Prix of Long Beach (formally known as the Acura Grand Prix of Long Beach) was a sports car race held at Long Beach Street Circuit in Long Beach, California on April 9, 2022. It was the third round of the 2022 IMSA SportsCar Championship and the first round of the 2022 WeatherTech Sprint Cup.

== Background ==
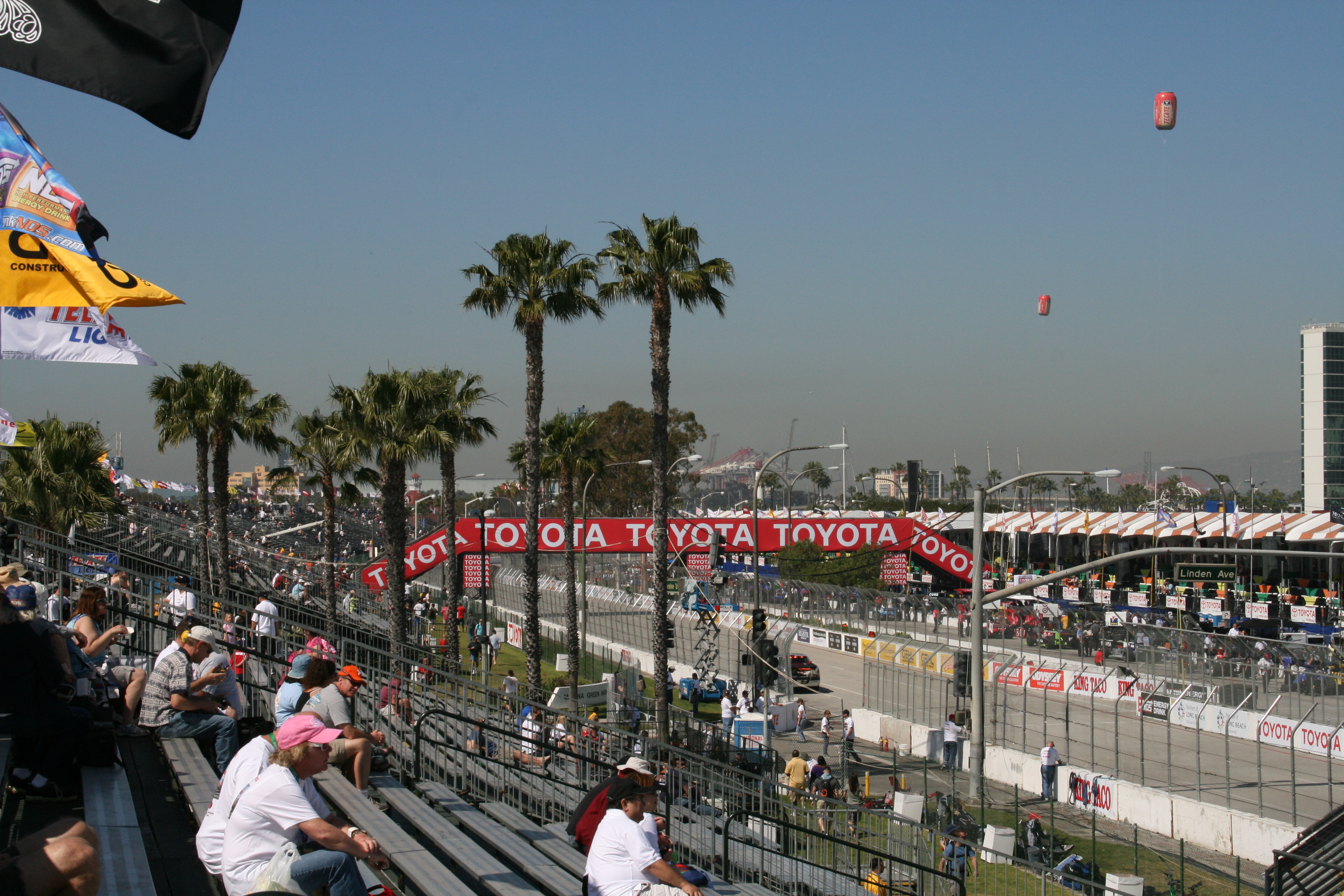
The Long Beach Street Circuit (pictured in 2009), where the race was held.

International Motor Sports Association's (IMSA) president John Doonan confirmed the race was part of the schedule for the 2022 IMSA SportsCar Championship (IMSA SCC) in August 2021. It was the eighth year the event was held as part of the WeatherTech SportsCar Championship, and the fourteenth annual running of the race, counting the period between 2006 and 2013 when it was a round of the Rolex Sports Car Series and the American Le Mans Series respectively. The 2022 Grand Prix of Long Beach was the third of twelve scheduled sports car races of 2022 by IMSA, the shortest of the season in terms of distance, and it was the first round held as part of the WeatherTech Sprint Cup. The race was held at the eleven-turn 1.968 mi (3.167 km) Long Beach Street Circuit in Long Beach, California on April 9, 2022.

On March 31, 2022, IMSA released the latest technical bulletin outlining Balance of Performance for the DPi, GTD Pro, and GTD classes. In DPi, the Acura ARX-05 received a 10 kilogram weight break. In GTD Pro and GTD, the Chevrolet Corvette C8.R GTD received a 10 kilogram weight increase, a 0.4mm smaller air restrictor, and a fuel capacity reduction of 4 liters. The BMW M4 GT3 lost 17 horsepower as well a 20 kilogram weight break and a fuel capacity reduction of 8 liters. The Porsche 911 GT3 R was given a 2mm larger air restrictor while the Acura NSX GT3 Evo22 received an increase in turbo boost pressure. The McLaren 720S GT3 was given a 15 kilogram weight break.

Before the race, Tristan Vautier, Richard Westbrook, and Loïc Duval led the DPi Drivers' Championship with 676 points, 11 points ahead of Filipe Albuquerque, Ricky Taylor, and Will Stevens in second followed by Tom Blomqvist and Oliver Jarvis in third with 663 points. With 668 points, the GTD Pro Drivers' Championship was led by Matt Campbell, Mathieu Jaminet, and Felipe Nasr with a thirteen-point advantage over Antonio García, Jordan Taylor, and Nicky Catsburg. With 672 points, Stevan McAleer and Mike Skeen led the GTD Drivers' Championship, 53 points ahead of Luís Pérez Companc, Simon Mann, and Toni Vilander in second followed by Ryan Hardwick, Jan Heylen, and Zacharie Robichon in third with 615 points. Cadillac, Porsche, and Ferrari were leading their respective Manufacturers' Championships, while JDC-Miller MotorSports, Pfaff Motorsports, and Gilbert Korthoff Motorsports each led their own Teams' Championships.

=== Entries ===
A total of 26 cars took part in the event, split across three classes. 6 were entered in DPi, 6 in GTD Pro, and 15 in GTD. The only change from the previous round in DPi was the absence of Ally Cadillac Racing. In GTD Pro, Risi Competizione, TR3 Racing, and Racers Edge Motorsports with WTR were absent. BMW M Team RLL scaled down to 1 car in order to focus on development for LMDh in 2023. WeatherTech Racing also scaled down to 1 car and changed its full season entry from using the Porsche 911 GT3 R to the Mercedes-AMG GT3 Evo. In GTD, NTE Sport skipped after its transporter suffered a tire blowout en route to the event. GMG Racing made its first appearance since the 2021 Long Beach round while Crucial Motorsports made its sprint debut at this event. Rick Ware Racing made its season debut with drivers Ryan Eversley and Aidan Read.

== Practice ==
There were two practice sessions preceding the start of the race on Saturday, one on Friday morning and one on Friday afternoon. The first session lasted 90 minutes on Friday morning while the second session on Friday afternoon lasted 105 minutes.

== Qualifying ==
Friday's afternoon qualifying was broken into two sessions, with one session for the DPi, GTD Pro and GTD classes, which lasted for 15 minutes each, and a ten minute interval between the sessions. The rules dictated that all teams nominated a driver to qualify their cars, with the Pro-Am (GTD) classes requiring a Bronze/Silver Rated Driver to qualify the car. The competitors' fastest lap times determined the starting order. IMSA then arranged the grid to put DPis ahead of the GTD Pro and GTD cars.

=== Qualifying results ===
Pole positions in each class are indicated in bold and by ‡.

Pos.	Class	No.	Team	Driver	Time	Gap	Grid
1	**DPi**	**01**	**(United States) Cadillac Racing**	**(France) Sébastien Bourdais**	**1:09.472**	-	1‡
2	DPi	02	(United States) Cadillac Racing	(United Kingdom) Alex Lynn	1:09.833	+0.361	2
3	DPi	60	(United States) Meyer Shank Racing with Curb-Agajanian	(United Kingdom) Tom Blomqvist	1:09.939	+0.467	3
4	DPi	31	(United States) Whelen Engineering Racing	(Brazil) Pipo Derani	1:10.001	+0.529	4
5	DPi	5	(United States) JDC-Miller MotorSports	(France) Tristan Vautier	1:10.376	+0.904	5
6	DPi	10	(United States) WTR - Konica Minolta Acura	(Portugal) Filipe Albuquerque	1:10.576	+1.104	6
7	**GTD Pro**	**3**	**(United States) Corvette Racing**	**(United States) Jordan Taylor**	**1:18.048**	**+8.576**	7‡
8	GTD Pro	25	(United States) BMW M Team RLL	(United States) Connor De Phillippi	1:18.115	+8.643	25 (Note: The No. 25 BMW M Team RLL qualifying time was invalidated post-session due to a technical infraction, and remaining valid time of 1:21.425 was used for grid instead.)
9	GTD Pro	9	(Canada) Pfaff Motorsports	(France) Mathieu Jaminet	1:18.173	+8.701	8
10	GTD Pro	23	(United States) Heart of Racing Team	(United Kingdom) Ross Gunn	1:18.437	+8.965	9
11	**GTD**	**1**	**(United States) Paul Miller Racing**	**(United States) Madison Snow**	**1:18.487**	**+9.015**	10‡
12	GTD	96	(United States) Turner Motorsport	(United States) Robby Foley	1:18.599	+9.127	18 (Note: The No. 96 Turner Motorsport qualifying time was invalidated post-session due to a technical infraction, and remaining valid time of 1:19.254 was used for grid instead.)
13	GTD Pro	14	(United States) Vasser Sullivan Racing	(United Kingdom) Jack Hawksworth	1:18.627	+9.155	11
14	GTD	32	(United States) Team Korthoff Motorsports	(United States) Mike Skeen	1:18.918	+9.446	12
15	GTD	59	(United States) Crucial Motorsports	(United States) Jon Miller	1:18.932	+9.460	13
16	GTD	57	(United States) Winward Racing	(United States) Russell Ward	1:18.973	+9.501	14
17	GTD	66	(United States) Gradient Racing	(United States) Marc Miller	1:19.146	+9.674	15
18	GTD	27	(United States) Heart of Racing Team	(Canada) Roman De Angelis	1:19.181	+9.709	16
19	GTD	12	(United States) Vasser Sullivan Racing	(United States) Frankie Montecalvo	1:19.181	+9.709	17
20	GTD	51	(Philippines) RWR Eurasia Motorsport	(Australia) Aidan Read	1:19.366	+9.894	19
21	GTD	70	(United Kingdom) Inception Racing with Optimum Motorsport	(United States) Brendan Iribe	1:19.385	+9.913	20
22	GTD	39	(United States) CarBahn with Peregrine Racing	(United States) Robert Megennis	1:19.742	+10.270	21
23	GTD Pro	79	(United States) WeatherTech Racing	(United States) Cooper MacNeil	1:19.743	+10.271	22
24	GTD	16	(United States) Wright Motorsports	(United States) Ryan Hardwick	1:20.072	+10.600	23
25	GTD	99	(United States) Team Hardpoint	(United States) Rob Ferriol	1:21.079	+11.607	24
26	GTD	34	(United States) GMG Racing	(United States) Kyle Washington	1:23.938	+14.466	26
QUALIFYING RESULTS STARTING GRID

== Race ==
=== Post-race ===
As a result of finishing second place, Bamber and Lynn took the lead of the DPi Drivers' Championship with 1005 points. Bourdais and van der Zande advanced from seventh to fifth while Filipe Albuquerque and Ricky Taylor dropped from second to fourth. As a result of winning the race, Gunn and Riberas advanced from tenth to fifth in the GTD Pro Drivers' Championship. Jordan Taylor and Antonio García jumped from second to first while MacNeil advanced from ninth to fourth. GTD drivers, teams, and manufactures did not score full season points due to the event only counting towards the WeatherTech Sprint Cup. Cadillac continued to top the DPi Manufactures' Championship while Chevrolet took the lead of the GTD Pro Manufactures' Championship. Cadillac Racing and Corvette Racing leaders of their respective class Teams' Championships with ten rounds remaining.

=== Race results ===
Class winners are denoted in bold and ‡.

Pos	Class	No	Team	Drivers	Chassis	Laps	Time/Retired
Pos	Class	No	Team	Drivers	Engine	Laps	Time/Retired
1	**DPi**	**01**	**(United States) Cadillac Racing**	**(France) Sébastien Bourdais (Netherlands) Renger van der Zande**	**Cadillac DPi-V.R**	**73**	**1:40:48.134‡**
1	**DPi**	**01**	**(United States) Cadillac Racing**	**(France) Sébastien Bourdais (Netherlands) Renger van der Zande**	**Cadillac 5.5 L V8**	**73**	**1:40:48.134‡**
2	DPi	02	(United States) Cadillac Racing	(United Kingdom) Alex Lynn (New Zealand) Earl Bamber	Cadillac DPi-V.R	73	+3.761
2	DPi	02	(United States) Cadillac Racing	(United Kingdom) Alex Lynn (New Zealand) Earl Bamber	Cadillac 5.5 L V8	73	+3.761
3	DPi	5	(United States) JDC-Miller MotorSports	(France) Tristan Vautier (United Kingdom) Richard Westbrook	Cadillac DPi-V.R	73	+9.048
3	DPi	5	(United States) JDC-Miller MotorSports	(France) Tristan Vautier (United Kingdom) Richard Westbrook	Cadillac 5.5 L V8	73	+9.048
4	DPi	60	(United States) Meyer Shank Racing with Curb-Agajanian	(United Kingdom) Tom Blomqvist (United Kingdom) Oliver Jarvis	Acura ARX-05	73	+10.014
4	DPi	60	(United States) Meyer Shank Racing with Curb-Agajanian	(United Kingdom) Tom Blomqvist (United Kingdom) Oliver Jarvis	Acura AR35TT 3.5 L Turbo V6	73	+10.014
5	DPi	31	(United States) Whelen Engineering Racing	(Brazil) Pipo Derani (United States) Tristan Nunez	Cadillac DPi-V.R	73	+10.535
5	DPi	31	(United States) Whelen Engineering Racing	(Brazil) Pipo Derani (United States) Tristan Nunez	Cadillac 5.5 L V8	73	+10.535
6	DPi	10	(United States) WTR - Konica Minolta Acura	(Portugal) Filipe Albuquerque (United States) Ricky Taylor	Acura ARX-05	73	+11.979
6	DPi	10	(United States) WTR - Konica Minolta Acura	(Portugal) Filipe Albuquerque (United States) Ricky Taylor	Acura AR35TT 3.5 L Turbo V6	73	+11.979
7	**GTD Pro**	**23**	**(United States) Heart of Racing Team**	**(United Kingdom) Ross Gunn (Spain) Alex Riberas**	**Aston Martin Vantage AMR GT3**	**69**	**+4 Laps‡**
7	**GTD Pro**	**23**	**(United States) Heart of Racing Team**	**(United Kingdom) Ross Gunn (Spain) Alex Riberas**	**Aston Martin 4.0 L Turbo V8**	**69**	**+4 Laps‡**
8	GTD Pro	14	(United States) Vasser Sullivan Racing	(United Kingdom) Jack Hawksworth (United Kingdom) Ben Barnicoat	Lexus RC F GT3	69	+4 Laps
8	GTD Pro	14	(United States) Vasser Sullivan Racing	(United Kingdom) Jack Hawksworth (United Kingdom) Ben Barnicoat	Toyota 2UR 5.0 L V8	69	+4 Laps
9	**GTD**	**1**	**(United States) Paul Miller Racing**	**(United States) Madison Snow (United States) Bryan Sellers**	**BMW M4 GT3**	**69**	**+4 Laps‡**
9	**GTD**	**1**	**(United States) Paul Miller Racing**	**(United States) Madison Snow (United States) Bryan Sellers**	**BMW S58B30T0 3.0 L Twin Turbo I6**	**69**	**+4 Laps‡**
10	GTD Pro	3	(United States) Corvette Racing	(United States) Jordan Taylor (Spain) Antonio García	Chevrolet Corvette C8.R GTD	69	+4 Laps
10	GTD Pro	3	(United States) Corvette Racing	(United States) Jordan Taylor (Spain) Antonio García	Chevrolet 5.5 L V8	69	+4 Laps
11	GTD	66	(United States) Gradient Racing	(United States) Marc Miller (Germany) Mario Farnbacher	Acura NSX GT3 Evo22	69	+4 Laps
11	GTD	66	(United States) Gradient Racing	(United States) Marc Miller (Germany) Mario Farnbacher	Acura 3.5 L Turbo V6	69	+4 Laps
12	GTD	12	(United States) Vasser Sullivan Racing	(United States) Frankie Montecalvo (United States) Aaron Telitz	Lexus RC F GT3	69	+4 Laps
12	GTD	12	(United States) Vasser Sullivan Racing	(United States) Frankie Montecalvo (United States) Aaron Telitz	Toyota 2UR 5.0 L V8	69	+4 Laps
13	GTD	96	(United States) Turner Motorsport	(United States) Robby Foley (United States) Bill Auberlen	BMW M4 GT3	69	+4 Laps
13	GTD	96	(United States) Turner Motorsport	(United States) Robby Foley (United States) Bill Auberlen	BMW S58B30T0 3.0 L Twin Turbo I6	69	+4 Laps
14	GTD	16	(United States) Wright Motorsports	(United States) Ryan Hardwick (Belgium) Jan Heylen	Porsche 911 GT3 R	69	+4 Laps
14	GTD	16	(United States) Wright Motorsports	(United States) Ryan Hardwick (Belgium) Jan Heylen	Porsche 4.0 L Flat-6	69	+4 Laps
15	GTD	32	(United States) Team Korthoff Motorsports	(United States) Mike Skeen (United Kingdom) Stevan McAleer	Mercedes-AMG GT3 Evo	69	+4 Laps
15	GTD	32	(United States) Team Korthoff Motorsports	(United States) Mike Skeen (United Kingdom) Stevan McAleer	Mercedes-AMG M159 6.2 L V8	69	+4 Laps
16	GTD	99	(United States) Team Hardpoint	(United States) Rob Ferriol (United Kingdom) Katherine Legge	Porsche 911 GT3 R	69	+4 Laps
16	GTD	99	(United States) Team Hardpoint	(United States) Rob Ferriol (United Kingdom) Katherine Legge	Porsche 4.0 L Flat-6	69	+4 Laps
17	GTD	51	(Philippines) RWR Eurasia Motorsport	(Australia) Aidan Read (United States) Ryan Eversley	Acura NSX GT3 Evo22	69	+4 Laps
17	GTD	51	(Philippines) RWR Eurasia Motorsport	(Australia) Aidan Read (United States) Ryan Eversley	Acura 3.5 L Turbo V6	69	+4 Laps
18	GTD	70	(United Kingdom) Inception Racing with Optimum Motorsport	(United States) Brendan Iribe (Denmark) Frederik Schandorff	McLaren 720S GT3	69	+4 Laps
18	GTD	70	(United Kingdom) Inception Racing with Optimum Motorsport	(United States) Brendan Iribe (Denmark) Frederik Schandorff	McLaren M840T 4.0L Turbo V8	69	+4 Laps
19	GTD Pro	79	(United States) WeatherTech Racing	(United States) Cooper MacNeil (Italy) Raffaele Marciello	Mercedes-AMG GT3 Evo	69	+4 Laps
19	GTD Pro	79	(United States) WeatherTech Racing	(United States) Cooper MacNeil (Italy) Raffaele Marciello	Mercedes-AMG M159 6.2 L V8	69	+4 Laps
20	GTD	34	(United States) GMG Racing	(United States) Kyle Washington (United States) James Sofronas	Porsche 911 GT3 R	67	+6 Laps
20	GTD	34	(United States) GMG Racing	(United States) Kyle Washington (United States) James Sofronas	Porsche 4.0 L Flat-6	67	+6 Laps
21 DNF	GTD	39	(United States) CarBahn with Peregrine Racing	(United States) Robert Megennis (United States) Jeff Westphal	Lamborghini Huracán GT3 Evo	57	Accident Damage
21 DNF	GTD	39	(United States) CarBahn with Peregrine Racing	(United States) Robert Megennis (United States) Jeff Westphal	Lamborghini 5.2 L V10	57	Accident Damage
22 DNF	GTD	27	(United States) Heart of Racing Team	(Canada) Roman De Angelis (Belgium) Maxime Martin	Aston Martin Vantage AMR GT3	48	Accident
22 DNF	GTD	27	(United States) Heart of Racing Team	(Canada) Roman De Angelis (Belgium) Maxime Martin	Aston Martin 4.0 L Turbo V8	48	Accident
23 DNF	GTD	59	(United States) Crucial Motorsports	(United States) Jon Miller (United States) Paul Holton	McLaren 720S GT3	47	Alternator Belt
23 DNF	GTD	59	(United States) Crucial Motorsports	(United States) Jon Miller (United States) Paul Holton	McLaren M840T 4.0L Turbo V8	47	Alternator Belt
24 DNF	GTD	57	(United States) Winward Racing	(United States) Russell Ward (United Kingdom) Philip Ellis	Mercedes-AMG GT3 Evo	33	Accident Damage
24 DNF	GTD	57	(United States) Winward Racing	(United States) Russell Ward (United Kingdom) Philip Ellis	Mercedes-AMG M159 6.2 L V8	33	Accident Damage
25 DNF	GTD Pro	9	(Canada) Pfaff Motorsports	(France) Mathieu Jaminet (Australia) Matt Campbell	Porsche 911 GT3 R	29	Radiator
25 DNF	GTD Pro	9	(Canada) Pfaff Motorsports	(France) Mathieu Jaminet (Australia) Matt Campbell	Porsche 4.0 L Flat-6	29	Radiator
26	GTD Pro	25	(United States) BMW M Team RLL	(United States) Connor De Phillippi (United States) John Edwards	BMW M4 GT3	69^{1}	+4 Laps
26	GTD Pro	25	(United States) BMW M Team RLL	(United States) Connor De Phillippi (United States) John Edwards	BMW S58B30T0 3.0 L Twin Turbo I6	69^{1}	+4 Laps
Sources:

- ^{1} The #25 BMW M Team RLL entry was demoted to last in the GTD Pro class as Connor De Phillippi exceeded maximum drive time for the race.

== Standings after the race ==
DPi Drivers' Championship standings
Pos.	+/–	Driver	Points
1	3	(United Kingdom) Alex Lynn (New Zealand) Earl Bamber	1005
2	1	(France) Tristan Vautier (United Kingdom) Richard Westbrook	1002
3		(United Kingdom) Tom Blomqvist (United Kingdom) Oliver Jarvis	973
4	2	(Portugal) Filipe Albuquerque (United States) Ricky Taylor	940
5	2	(France) Sébastien Bourdais (Netherlands) Renger van der Zande	926

LMP2 Drivers' Championship standings
Pos.	+/–	Driver	Points
1		(United States) Ben Keating (United States) Scott Huffaker (Denmark) Mikkel Jensen	385
2		(Netherlands) Frits van Eerd (Netherlands) Giedo van der Garde	348
3		(United Kingdom) Ryan Dalziel (United States) Dwight Merriman (United Kingdom) Kyle Tilley	330
4		(United States) Steven Thomas (United States) Josh Pierson (United States) Jonathan Bomarito	303
5		(United States) James McGuire (United Kingdom) Guy Smith (United Kingdom) Duncan Tappy	284

LMP3 Drivers' Championship standings
Pos.	+/–	Driver	Points
1		(Portugal) João Barbosa (United States) Lance Willsey (Denmark) Malthe Jakobsen	374
2		(United States) Ari Balogh (United States) Dakota Dickerson (Canada) Garett Grist	343
3		(United States) Daniel Goldburg (Sweden) Rasmus Lindh (Australia) Cameron Shields	326
4		(Germany) Lars Kern (Canada) Kuno Wittmer (Canada) Orey Fidani	302
5		(United States) Jon Bennett (United States) Colin Braun (United States) George Kurtz	285

GTD Pro Drivers' Championship standings
Pos.	+/–	Driver	Points
1	1	(Spain) Antonio García (United States) Jordan Taylor	990
2	1	(Australia) Matt Campbell (France) Mathieu Jaminet	960
3	2	(United Kingdom) Ben Barnicoat (United Kingdom) Jack Hawksworth	919
4	4	(United States) Cooper MacNeil	830
5	5	(United Kingdom) Ross Gunn (Spain) Alex Riberas	816

GTD Drivers' Championship standings
Pos.	+/–	Driver	Points
1		(United Kingdom) Stevan McAleer (United States) Mike Skeen	672‡
2		(Argentina) Luís Pérez Companc (United Kingdom) Simon Mann (Finland) Toni Vilander	619‡
3		(United States) Ryan Hardwick (Belgium) Jan Heylen (Canada) Zacharie Robichon	615‡
4		(United States) Andy Lally (United States) John Potter (United States) Spencer Pumpelly	609‡
5		(Australia) Scott Andrews	587‡

- Note: Only the top five positions are included for all sets of standings.
- ‡: Points count towards WeatherTech Sprint Cup championship only.

DPi Teams' Championship standings
Pos.	+/–	Team	Points
1	3	(United States) #02 Cadillac Racing	1005
2	1	(United States) #5 JDC-Miller MotorSports	1002
3		(United States) #60 Meyer Shank Racing w/ Curb-Agajanian	973
4	2	(United States) #10 WTR - Konica Minolta Acura	940
5	2	(United States) #01 Cadillac Racing	926

LMP2 Teams' Championship standings
Pos.	+/–	Team	Points
1		(United States) #52 PR1/Mathiasen Motorsports	385
2		(Netherlands) #29 Racing Team Nederland	348
3		(United States) #18 Era Motorsport	330
4		(United States) #11 PR1/Mathiasen Motorsports	303
5		(United Kingdom) #22 United Autosports	284

LMP3 Teams' Championship standings
Pos.	+/–	Team	Points
1		(United States) #33 Sean Creech Motorsport	374
2		(United States) #30 Jr III Motorsports	343
3		(United States) #38 Performance Tech Motorsports	326
4		(Canada) #13 AWA	302
5		(United States) #54 CORE Autosport	285

GTD Pro Teams' Championship standings
Pos.	+/–	Team	Points
1	1	(United States) #3 Corvette Racing	990
2	1	(Canada) #9 Pfaff Motorsports	960
3	2	(United States) #14 Vasser Sullivan Racing	919
4	4	(United States) #79 WeatherTech Racing	830
5	5	(United States) #23 Heart of Racing Team	816

GTD Teams' Championship standings
Pos.	+/–	Team	Points
1		(United States) #32 Gilbert Korthoff Motorsports	672‡
2		(Italy) #21 AF Corse	619‡
3		(United States) #16 Wright Motorsports	615‡
4		(United States) #44 Magnus Racing	609‡
5		(Italy) #47 Cetilar Racing	567‡

- Note: Only the top five positions are included for all sets of standings.
- ‡: Points count towards WeatherTech Sprint Cup championship only.

DPi Manufacturers' Championship standings
Pos.	+/–	Manufacturer	Points
1		(United States) Cadillac	1122
2		(Japan) Acura	1089

GTD Pro Manufacturers' Championship standings
Pos.	+/–	Manufacturer	Points
1	1	(United States) Chevrolet	1000
2	1	(Germany) Porsche	960
3	3	(Japan) Lexus	949
4	1	(Germany) Mercedes-AMG	938
5	3	(United Kingdom) Aston Martin	886

GTD Manufacturers' Championship standings
Pos.	+/–	Manufacturer	Points
1		(Italy) Ferrari	684‡
2		(Germany) Mercedes-AMG	683‡
3		(Germany) Porsche	650‡
4		(United Kingdom) Aston Martin	628‡
5		(United Kingdom) McLaren	598‡

- Note: Only the top five positions are included for all sets of standings.
- ‡: Points count towards WeatherTech Sprint Cup championship only.

IMSA SportsCar Championship
Previous race: 2022 12 Hours of Sebring	2022 season	Next race: 2022 Hyundai Monterey SportsCar Championship
