= Formula Future Fiat =

Single-Seater Racing Championship

- Category: Open wheeled
- Country: Brazil
- Inaugural season: 2010
- Folded: 2011
- Constructors: (France) (Italy) Signatech Fiat
- Engine suppliers: (Italy) FPT
- Last Drivers' champion: Guilerme Silva

Formula Future Fiat was an open wheel racing series founded in 2010 by Felipe Massa and his family. It was based in Brazil. The champion received support to compete in Formula Abarth.

The category was founded in 2010 by Felipe Massa and his family. The series was organized in collaboration with the Confederação Brasileira de Automobilismo (CBA), RM Racing Events and Carlinhos Romagnolli Promoções e Eventos.

== History ==
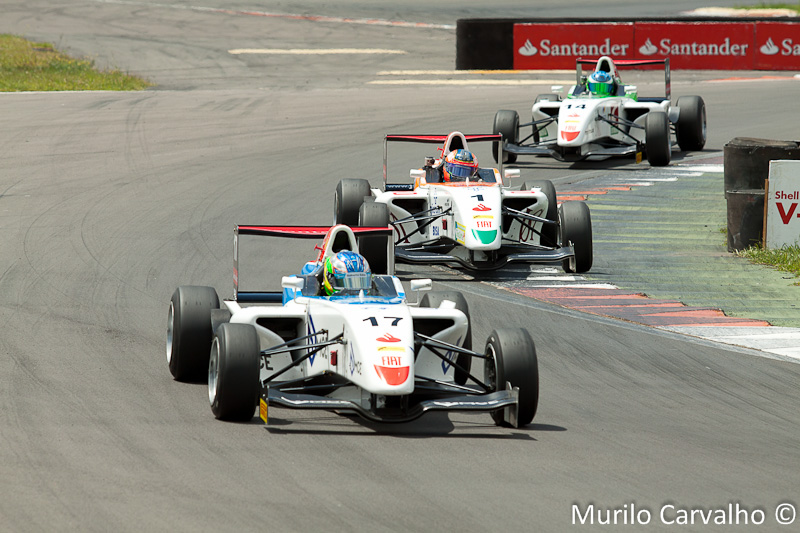
Last race of 2011 Season.

The largest attraction of this category was the low cost to enter, thus enabling the continuation of drivers coming out of karting to develop their skills driving formula racing cars for when they arrive overseas in a luggage grade experience in next-generation cars.

The category is organized to support driver development through a structured program. During the season, the organization provides standardized services, including prepared garages, transportation of cars, and access to mechanics, engineers, fuel tires, and maintenance. These elements are included as part of the package available to participating drivers.

== The car ==
The car was designed to comply with the Signatech-Fiat. The FPT engine have 150 hp and a top speed of more than 200 km/h. The transmission has five forward speeds with sequential shift mechanism. Pirelli is the single tyre supplier for the championship.

== Regulation ==
Drivers have four free practice sessions of 30-minutes and 20-minutes. On Saturday drivers have a qualifying session. The qualifying session decides the grid order for Saturday's race.

On Sunday race, the grid is decided by the Saturday result with top 8 being reversed, so the driver who finished 8th on Saturday will start from pole position and the winner will start from 8th place.

Formula Future Fiat points system
	1st	2nd	3rd	4th	5th	6th	7th	8th	9th	10th
Race 1	20	14	12	10	8	6	4	3	2	1
Race 2	15	12	10	8	6	4	2	1		

== Champions ==
All drivers were Brazilian-registered.

Season	Champion	Second	Third
2010	(Brazil) Nicolas Costa	(Brazil) Francisco Alfaya	(Brazil) João Jardim
2011	(Brazil) Guilherme Silva	(Brazil) Luir Miranda	(Brazil) John Louis

== Circuits ==
The circuits for the 2011 season were:

- Autódromo José Carlos Pace (Interlagos), São Paulo, SP
- Autódromo Internacional de Curitiba, Pinhais, PR
- Velopark, Nova Santa Rita, RS
- Autódromo Internacional Ayrton Senna, Londrina, PR
- Autódromo Internacional Nelson Piquet, Brasília, DF

Former circuits in the Formula Future Fiat championship include:

- Autódromo Internacional Nelson Piquet (Jacarepaguá), Rio de Janeiro, RJ (last race: 2010)
- Autódromo Internacional de Santa Cruz do Sul, Santa Cruz do Sul, RS (last race: 2010)
