= 2016 U.S. F2000 National Championship =

Car racing competition

The 2016 U.S. F2000 National Championship was the seventh season – since its revival in 2010 – of the U.S. F2000 National Championship, an open wheel auto racing series that is the first step in INDYCAR's Road to Indy ladder, and is owned by Andersen Promotions. A 16-race schedule was announced on October 27, 2015. The National class was re-introduced, for SCCA Formula Continental cars.

Australian Anthony Martin and his Cape Motorsports teammate Canadian Parker Thompson were neck and neck throughout the season. Ultimately Martin captured the championship on the back of seven wins compared to Thompson's four. Thompson finished on the podium in twelve of the sixteen races, one more than Martin. Brazilian Victor Franzoni won three races and was running at the finish of every race and finished third in points, fourteen points behind Thompson. Jordan Lloyd and Luo Yufeng also captured race victories.

Cape Motorsports won the team championship by a comfortable margin.

Eric Filgueiras won the National Class championship, largely unopposed.

2016 was the final year for the Van Diemen-designed Formula Continental derived cars in Championship Class. In 2017 it will be replaced by a new bespoke design from Tatuus. The old cars will remain eligible for National Class.

== Drivers and teams ==
Team	No.	Driver(s)	Status	Round(s)
Afterburner Autosport	17	(Brazil) Felipe Ortiz	R	1–2
Afterburner Autosport	17	(Colombia) Christian Muñoz	R	12–14
Afterburner Autosport	18	(United States) Dakota Dickerson	R	All
ArmsUp Motorsports	6	(United States) Max Hanratty		1–6, 8–9
ArmsUp Motorsports	7	(United States) Dale VandenBush	R N	5–6, 8–9
ArmsUp Motorsports	9	(Brazil) Victor Franzoni		All
ArmsUp Motorsports	16	(United States) Devin Wojcik	R	8–9
Cape Motorsports; Wayne Taylor Racing	2	(Canada) Parker Thompson		All
Cape Motorsports; Wayne Taylor Racing	3	(Russia) Nikita Lastochkin		1–6, 8–16
Cape Motorsports; Wayne Taylor Racing	4	(United Kingdom) Jordan Cane	R	8–14
Cape Motorsports; Wayne Taylor Racing	8	(Australia) Anthony Martin		All
Chastain Motorsports	5	(United States) Austin McCusker	R	1–14
Chastain Motorsports	77	(United States) Sam Chastain	R	1–6, 8–14
FatBoy Racing	15	(United States) Brendan Puderbach	R N	1–2, 5–6, 8–11
FatBoy Racing	44	(United States) Charles Finelli	R N	1–2, 5–6
JAY Motorsports	91	(Australia) Luke Gabin		All
JAY Motorsports	92	(United States) Cameron Das	R	3–6, 8–16
JDC Motorsports	52	(United States) Robert Allaer	R N	1–2
JDC Motorsports	72	(United States) Tazio Ottis	R	All
John Cummiskey Racing	33	(Norway) Ayla Ågren		1–9, 12–14
John Cummiskey Racing	33	(New Zealand) Michael Scott	R	15–16
John Cummiskey Racing	34	(Brazil) Lucas Kohl	R	All
Pabst Racing Services	21	(Australia) Jordan Lloyd		All
Pabst Racing Services	22	(United States) Garth Rickards		All
Pabst Racing Services	23	(China) Luo Yufeng		All
RJB Motorsports	19	(United States) Michai Stephens	R	1–6, 8–14
RJB Motorsports	20	(United States) Clint McMahan	R	1–6, 8–14
Spencer Racing	12	(United States) Eric Filgueiras	R N	1–6, 8–14
Team Pelfrey	80	(United States) Robert Megennis	R	All
Team Pelfrey	81	(United Kingdom) Jordan Cane	R	1–6
Team Pelfrey	81	(United States) Kaylen Frederick	R	15–16
Team Pelfrey	82	(United States) TJ Fischer	R	1–6
Team Pelfrey	82	(United States) Phillippe Denes	R	15–16
Team Pelfrey	83	(New Zealand) James Munro	R	1–4
Tomasi Motorsports	11	(United States) Robert Armington	R N	5–6, 15–16

Icon	Class
R	Rookie
N	National Class

== Schedule ==
The schedule for the 2016 season was announced on October 27, 2016. The championship continued to feature 16 races. The visit at NOLA Motorsports Park was discontinued along with the Indy Grand Prix of Louisiana after just one year. It was replaced by Road America, which was returning to the IndyCar Series calendar, and had last been visited by U.S. F2000 in the 2012 season.

Icon	Legend
O	Oval/Speedway
R	Road course
S	Street circuit

Rd.	Date	Race name	Track	Location
1	March 12	Priority Marine Construction Grand Prix of St. Petersburg	S Streets of St. Petersburg	St. Petersburg, Florida
2	March 12	Hi-Tide Boat Lifts Grand Prix of St. Petersburg	S Streets of St. Petersburg	St. Petersburg, Florida
3	April 22–23	Cooper Tires USF2000 Grand Prix of Alabama	R Barber Motorsports Park	Birmingham, Alabama
4	April 22–23	Cooper Tires USF2000 Grand Prix of Alabama	R Barber Motorsports Park	Birmingham, Alabama
5	May 13–14	Cooper Tires USF2000 Grand Prix of Indianapolis	R Indianapolis Motor Speedway Road Course	Speedway, Indiana
6	May 13–14	Cooper Tires USF2000 Grand Prix of Indianapolis	R Indianapolis Motor Speedway Road Course	Speedway, Indiana
7	May 27	Mazda Freedom 75	O Lucas Oil Raceway	Clermont, Indiana
8	June 25	Cooper Tires USF2000 Grand Prix of Road America	R Road America	Elkhart Lake, Wisconsin
9	June 25	Cooper Tires USF2000 Grand Prix of Road America	R Road America	Elkhart Lake, Wisconsin
10	July 16–17	Allied Building Products Grand Prix of Toronto	S Exhibition Place	Toronto, Canada
11	July 16–17	Allied Building Products Grand Prix of Toronto	S Exhibition Place	Toronto, Canada
12	July 29–31	Allied Building Products Grand Prix of Mid-Ohio	R Mid-Ohio Sports Car Course	Lexington, Ohio
13	July 29–31	Allied Building Products Grand Prix of Mid-Ohio	R Mid-Ohio Sports Car Course	Lexington, Ohio
14	July 29–31	Allied Building Products Grand Prix of Mid-Ohio	R Mid-Ohio Sports Car Course	Lexington, Ohio
15	September 10–11	Cooper Tires Grand Prix of Monterey	R WeatherTech Raceway Laguna Seca	Salinas, California
16	September 10–11	Cooper Tires Grand Prix of Monterey	R WeatherTech Raceway Laguna Seca	Salinas, California

== Race results ==
Rd.	Track	Pole position	Fastest lap	Most laps led	Race winner	
Rd.	Track	Pole position	Fastest lap	Most laps led	Driver	Team
1	Streets of St. Petersburg	(Australia) Jordan Lloyd	(Australia) Anthony Martin	(Australia) Jordan Lloyd	(Australia) Jordan Lloyd	Pabst Racing
2	Streets of St. Petersburg	(Australia) Jordan Lloyd	(China) Luo Yufeng	(Australia) Jordan Lloyd	(China) Luo Yufeng	Pabst Racing
3	Barber Motorsports Park	(Canada) Parker Thompson	(Canada) Parker Thompson	(Canada) Parker Thompson	(Canada) Parker Thompson	Cape Motorsports with WTR
4	Barber Motorsports Park	(Australia) Anthony Martin	(Canada) Parker Thompson	(Canada) Parker Thompson	(Canada) Parker Thompson	Cape Motorsports with WTR
5	Indianapolis Motor Speedway Road Course	(Australia) Anthony Martin	(Canada) Parker Thompson	(Australia) Anthony Martin	(Australia) Anthony Martin	Cape Motorsports with WTR
6	Indianapolis Motor Speedway Road Course	(Canada) Parker Thompson	(Canada) Parker Thompson	(Canada) Parker Thompson	(Canada) Parker Thompson	Cape Motorsports with WTR
7	Lucas Oil Raceway	(Canada) Parker Thompson	(Canada) Parker Thompson	(Canada) Parker Thompson	(Australia) Anthony Martin	Cape Motorsports with WTR
8	Road America	(Australia) Anthony Martin	(Australia) Anthony Martin	(Australia) Anthony Martin	(Australia) Anthony Martin	Cape Motorsports with WTR
9	Road America	(Australia) Anthony Martin	(Australia) Jordan Lloyd	(Australia) Anthony Martin	(Australia) Anthony Martin	Cape Motorsports with WTR
10	Streets of Toronto	(Australia) Anthony Martin	(Brazil) Victor Franzoni	(Brazil) Victor Franzoni	(Brazil) Victor Franzoni	ArmsUp Motorsports
11	Streets of Toronto	(Australia) Anthony Martin	(Australia) Jordan Lloyd	(Canada) Parker Thompson	(Canada) Parker Thompson	Cape Motorsports with WTR
12	Mid-Ohio Sports Car Course	(Australia) Anthony Martin	(Australia) Anthony Martin	(Australia) Anthony Martin	(Australia) Anthony Martin	Cape Motorsports with WTR
13	Mid-Ohio Sports Car Course	(Australia) Anthony Martin	(Canada) Parker Thompson	(Australia) Anthony Martin	(Australia) Anthony Martin	Cape Motorsports with WTR
14	Mid-Ohio Sports Car Course	(Australia) Anthony Martin	(Canada) Parker Thompson	(Australia) Anthony Martin	(Australia) Anthony Martin	Cape Motorsports with WTR
15	WeatherTech Raceway Laguna Seca	(Brazil) Victor Franzoni	(Brazil) Victor Franzoni	(Brazil) Victor Franzoni	(Brazil) Victor Franzoni	ArmsUp Motorsports
16	WeatherTech Raceway Laguna Seca	(Brazil) Victor Franzoni	(Brazil) Victor Franzoni	(Brazil) Victor Franzoni	(Brazil) Victor Franzoni	ArmsUp Motorsports

== Championship standings ==
=== Drivers' Championship ===
Pos	Driver	STP		BAR		IMS		LOR	ROA		TOR		MOH			LAG		Points
Championship class
1	(Australia) Anthony Martin	5	10	3	**4**	**1***	4	1	**1***	**1***	**16**	**2**	**1***	**1***	**1***	3	2	394
2	(Canada) Parker Thompson	15	4	**1***	1*	2	**1***	**2***	5	3	3	1*	17	2	2	2	3	374
3	(Brazil) Victor Franzoni	6	12	2	9	3	2	3	4	2	1*	3	2	3	4	**1***	**1***	360
4	(Australia) Jordan Lloyd	**1***	**2***	5	20	4	5	4	2	21	2	8	4	16	5	5	4	276
5	(Australia) Luke Gabin	4	5	4	2	20	3	11	3	7	4	10	3	11	16	4	5	252
6	(United States) Robert Megennis	3	8	12	3	8	10	6	7	11	5	5	19	4	7	8	8	224
7	(China) Luo Yufeng	2	1	14	11	5	6	5	24	9	6	7	18	17	9	6	7	212
8	(Russia) Nikita Lastochkin	9	7	7	5	23	11		6	8	17	6	6	7	8	11	6	183
9	(United States) Dakota Dickerson	8	22	17	13	11	20	9	12	10	7	4	5	5	6	10	10	176
10	(United States) Garth Rickards	24	6	9	7	15	7	7	23	5	15	17	7	6	3	12	15	172
11	(Norway) Ayla Ågren	10	13	8	6	7	12	8	8	4			10	21	11			137
12	(Brazil) Lucas Kohl	23	14	21	21	6	8	10	11	13	10	12	9	18	12	9	9	136
13	(United Kingdom) Jordan Cane	25	3	6	19	10	21		21	6	9	16	8	9	14			121
14	(United States) Austin McCusker	20	DNS	10	8	14	23	12	10	15	11	11	11	8	10			118
15	(United States) Tazio Ottis	12	15	15	17	16	14	DNS	17	17	12	14	15	12	15	15	16	102
16	(United States) Cameron Das			20	12	17	24		9	14	8	15	DNS	10	20	14	12	83
17	(United States) Michai Stephens	11	DNS	19	15	18	15		13	20	13	9	12	14	13			82
18	(United States) Sam Chastain	13	16	18	22	12	13		20	23	DNS		16	13	18			62
19	(United States) TJ Fischer	22	9	13	10	9	9											58
20	(United States) Clint McMahan	7	23	23	14	19	16		16	19	DNS		13	19	17			52
21	(United States) Max Hanratty	26	20	16	16	13	19		15	12								42
22	(United States) Phillippe Denes															7	11	24
23	(New Zealand) James Munro	18	21	11	23													20
24	(United States) Kaylen Frederick															13	13	16
25	(Colombia) Christian Muñoz												14	15	19			15
26	(Brazil) Felipe Ortiz	21	11															14
27	(United States) Devin Wojcik								14	16								12
28	(New Zealand) Michael Scott															17	14	12
National class
1	(United States) Eric Filgueiras	14	17	22	18	21	25		22	24	14	13	20	20	DNS			262
2	(United States) Brendan Puderbach	19	18			25	22		19	22	18							111
3	(United States) Robert Armington					22	18									16	17	80
4	(United States) Dale VandenBush					26	17		18	18								76
5	(United States) Charles Finelli	17	24			24												42
6	(United States) Robert Allaer	16	19															33
Pos	Driver	STP		BAR		IMS		LOR	ROA		TOR		MOH			LAG		Points

Color	Result
Gold	Winner
Silver	2nd place
Bronze	3rd place
Green	4th & 5th place
Light Blue	6th–10th place
Dark Blue	Finished (Outside Top 10)
Purple	Did not finish
Red	Did not qualify (DNQ)
Brown	Withdrawn (Wth)
Black	Disqualified (DSQ)
White	Did not start (DNS)
Blank	Did not participate

**In-line notation**
**Bold**	Pole position (1 point)
Italics	Ran fastest race lap (1 point)
*	Led most race laps (1 point); Not awarded if more than one driver leads most laps
Rookie

=== Teams' Championship ===
Pos	Team	Points
1	Cape Motorsports w/ Wayne Taylor Racing	525
2	Pabst Racing	338
3	ArmsUp Motorsports	271
4	JAY Motorsports	186
5	Team Pelfrey	180
6	John Cummiskey Racing	110
7	Chastain Motorsports	52
8	RJB Motorsports	34
