= Benjamin Pedersen =

Danish racing driver (born 1999)

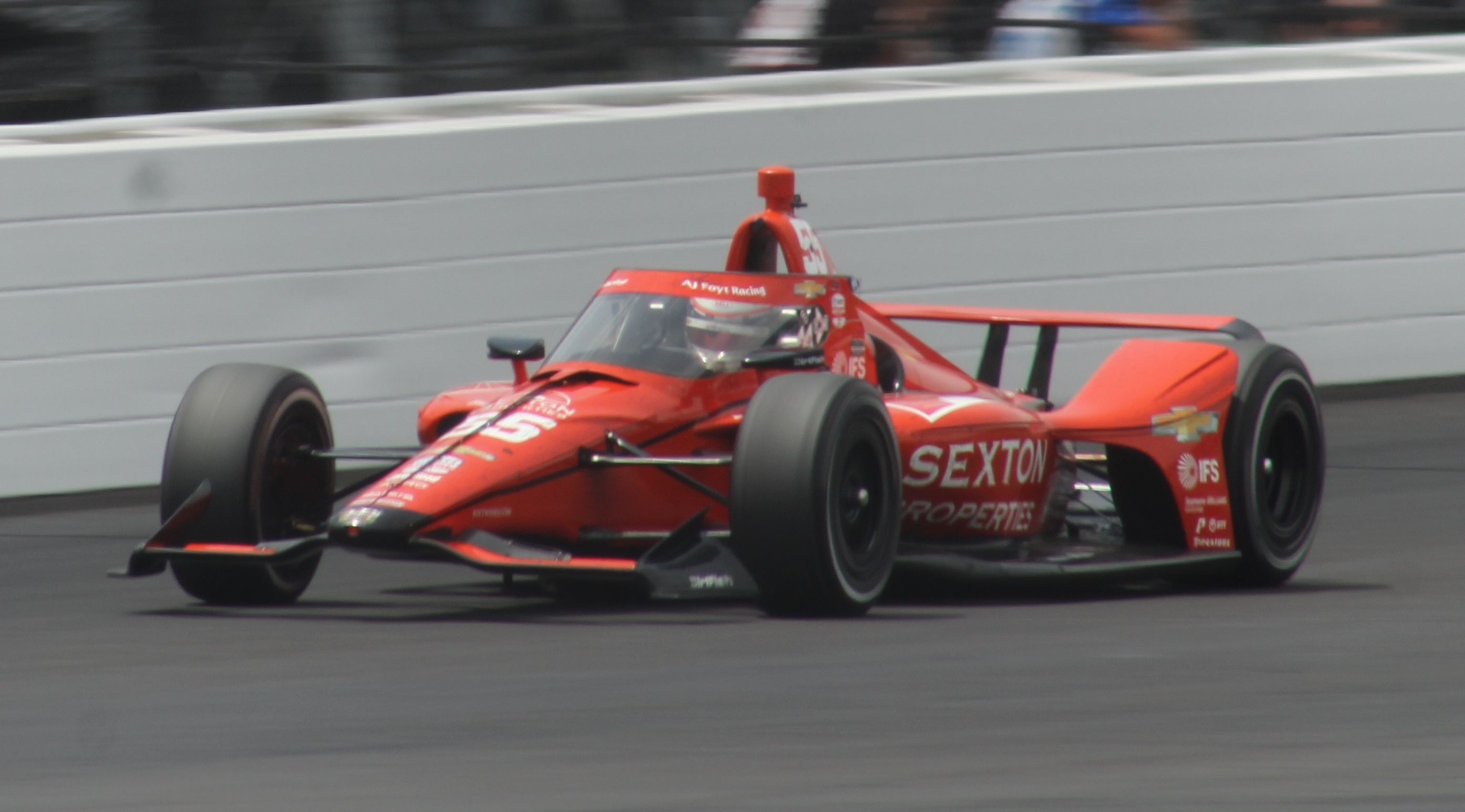
- Pedersen at the 2023 Indianapolis 500
- Nationality: (Denmark) Danish
- Born: 11 May 1999 (age 27) Copenhagen, Denmark

IMSA SportsCar Championship career
- Debut season: 2025
- Current team: Vasser Sullivan Racing
- Categorisation: FIA Silver
- Former teams: PR1/Mathiasen Motorsports
- Starts: 16
- Wins: 1
- Podiums: 3
- Poles: 1
- Fastest laps: 0
- Best finish: 4th in 2026

IndyCar Series career
- 17 races run over 1 year
- Best finish: 16th (2023)
- First race: 2023 Firestone Grand Prix of St. Petersburg (St. Petersburg)
- Last race: 2023 Grand Prix of Monterey (Laguna Seca)
Wins	Podiums	Poles
0	0	0

Previous series
- 2024 2023 2021-2022 2019-2020 2018-2020 2016-2018: European Le Mans Series; IndyCar Series; Indy Lights; BRDC British F3; F3 Americas Championship; F4 United States Championship

Benjamin Pedersen (born 11 May 1999) is a Danish racing driver who competes in the IMSA SportsCar Championship for Vasser Sullivan Racing. He previously raced in the IndyCar Series, driving the No. 55 Chevrolet for A. J. Foyt Racing.

Pedersen is a member of A14 Management, overseen by two-time Formula One world champion Fernando Alonso.

== Career ==
=== Lower formulae ===
Pedersen began his single-seater career in 2016, driving for the Leading Edge Grand Prix in cooperation with Global Racing Group, a team set up by his father, Christian Pedersen, in the F4 United States Championship. While he had a strong start with a podium finish at Mid-Ohio, Pedersen ended up tenth in the drivers' standings.

For the 2017 season, Pedersen remained in the F4 US series, partnering with Justin Sirgany and Jacob Loomis at Global Racing Group. This season yielded more success, as he took podiums in the first two events before ending the campaign on a particularly impressive note, winning twice in the penultimate round and once more at the season finale, held as part of the 2017 United States Grand Prix weekend. These results led to Pedersen finishing fourth overall, beating both his teammates.

In 2018, Pedersen returned to tackle the F4 US Championship for the final time, where he won two victories, and placed fifth in the standings.

=== Formula Regional & BRDC F3 ===
Parallel to his F4 campaign, Pedersen competed in the inaugural season of the F3 Americas Championship. Despite missing two events, Pedersen finished third overall, beaten by fellow GRG driver Baltazar Leguizamón.

In 2019, Pedersen performed double duties in the F3 Americas and BRDC F3 championships, the latter becoming his first venture into European racing. In the former, Pedersen won seven races, which included a triple of victories at Sebring, which put him second in the standings. Over in British F3, a victory in the reverse-grid race at Silverstone, coupled with a further podium in Snetterton, left Pedersen 14th overall.

An entire season of the BRDC British F3 Championship was on the cards for Pedersen in 2020, driving for Double R Racing. He ended the season ninth in the drivers' standings, taking three podiums and another win in Silvestone.

=== Indy Lights ===
Pedersen switched to the Road to Indy ladder for 2021, driving for Global Racing Group in Indy Lights. The season began with a second place at Barber, although he would fail to take any podiums throughout the following three rounds. Pedersen, who was racing under an American licence by this stage, bounced back with a podium appearance at Road America before going on to experience a strong second half of the campaign, with four third-placed finishes elevating him to fourth overall.

In 2022, Pedersen returned to Indy Lights for his sophomore season. Having scored five podiums, which contained his first win in the category at Portland, Pedersen took fifth in the championship.

== IndyCar Series ==
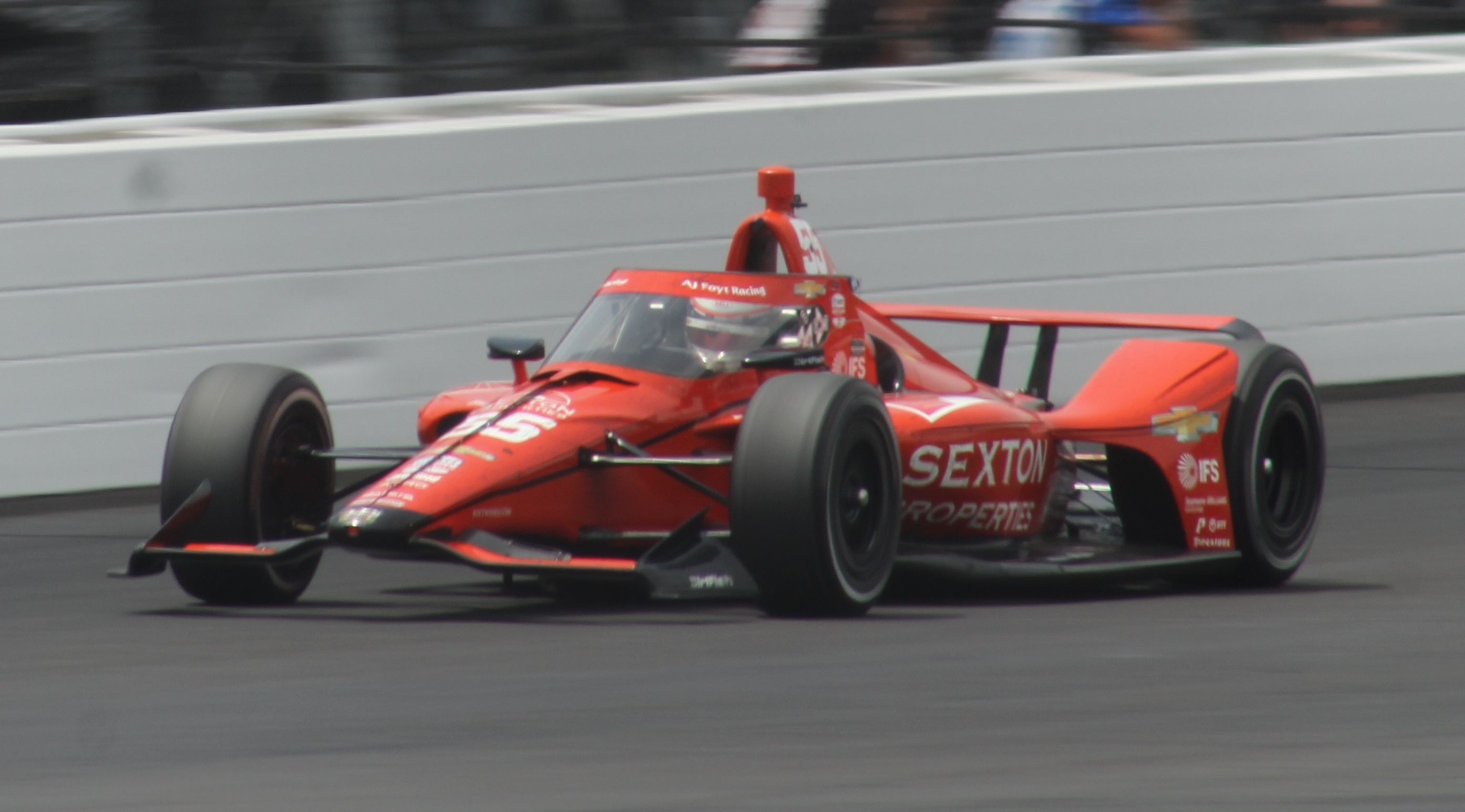
Pedersen competing in the 2023 Indianapolis 500.

Having tested for Juncos Hollinger Racing at the end of June, it was announced that Pedersen would enter the IndyCar Series in 2023, driving for the A. J. Foyt Racing team alongside Santino Ferrucci. In his first Indianapolis 500, Pedersen was named Rookie of the Year.

== Personal life ==
Pedersen was born in Copenhagen, Denmark. At age four, his family emigrated to the United States, settling in Sammamish, Washington.

After joining A. J. Foyt Racing, Pedersen relocated to Indianapolis, Indiana, in 2022.

== Racing record ==
=== Career summary ===
Season	Series	Team	Races	Wins	Poles	F/Laps	Podiums	Points	Position
2016	Formula 4 United States Championship	Leading Edge Grand Prix & Global Racing Group	15	0	0	0	1	57	10th
2017	Formula 4 United States Championship	Global Racing Group	20	3	2	2	6	147	4th
2018	Formula 4 United States Championship	Global Racing Group	17	2	1	2	4	166	5th
2018	F3 Americas Championship	Global Racing Group	11	0	0	1	10	183	**3rd**
2019	BRDC British Formula 3 Championship	Global Racing Group	21	1	0	0	2	200	14th
2019	F3 Americas Championship	Global Racing Group	10	7	3	2	9	221	**2nd**
2020	BRDC British Formula 3 Championship	Double R Racing	24	1	0	0	2	299	9th
2020	Euroformula Open Championship	Double R Racing	3	0	0	0	0	14	15th
2020	Formula Regional Americas Championship	Global Racing Group	5	0	0	0	0	30	12th
2021	Indy Lights	Global Racing Group with HMD Motorsports	20	0	0	1	6	356	4th
2022	Indy Lights	Global Racing Group with HMD Motorsports	14	1	1	1	5	444	5th
2023	IndyCar Series	A.J. Foyt Enterprises	17	0	0	0	0	129	27th
2024	European Le Mans Series - LMP2	Nielsen Racing	3	0	0	0	0	1	22nd
2025	IMSA SportsCar Championship - LMP2	PR1/Mathiasen Motorsports	7	0	0	0	1	1826	10th
2025	European Le Mans Series - LMP2	Duqueine Team	3	0	0	0	0	1	18th
2026	IMSA SportsCar Championship - GTD	Vasser Sullivan Racing	10	1	1	0	2	2677	4th

=== Complete Formula 4 United States Championship results ===
(key) (Races in bold indicate pole position) (Races in italics indicate fastest lap)

Year	Entrant	1	2	3	4	5	6	7	8	9	10	11	12	13	14	15	16	17	18	19	20	DC	Points
2016	Leading Edge Grand Prix	MOH1; 1; 3	MOH1; 2; 9	MOH1; 3; 5	MOH2; 1 Ret	MOH2; 2 Ret	MOH2; 3 Ret	NJMP; 1; 9	NJMP; 2; 4	NJMP; 3; 10	ATL; 1; 11	ATL; 2; 6	ATL; 3; 10	HMS; 1; 7	HMS; 2 Ret	HMS; 2 Ret						10th	57
2017	Global Racing Group	**HMS**; **1**; 2	HMS; 2; 11	HMS; 2 Ret	IMS; 1; 18	IMS; 2; 15	IMS; 3; 3	MSP; 1; 25	MSP; 2; 16	MSP; 3; 14	MOH; 1; 16	MOH; 2; 8	MOH; 3; 10	VIR; 1; 5	VIR; 2; 9	VIR; 3; 7	**COTA1**; **1**; 1	COTA1; 2; 1	COTA1; 3; 3	COTA2; 1; 1	COTA2; 2; 10	4th	147
2018	Global Racing Group	**VIR**; **1**; 1	VIR; 2; 4	VIR; 3; 5	ROA; 1; 1	ROA; 2; 4	ROA; 3; 3	MOH; 1; 5	MOH; 2; 5	MOH; 3; 4	PIT; 1; 3	PIT; 2; 21	PIT; 3; 7	NJMP; 1; 8	NJMP; 2 Ret	NJMP; 3; 14	COTA; 1; 5	COTA; 2 Ret				5th	166

=== Complete BRDC British Formula 3 Championship results ===
(key) (Races in bold indicate pole position) (Races in italics indicate fastest lap)

Year	Team	1	2	3	4	5	6	7	8	9	10	11	12	13	14	15	16	17	18	19	20	21	22	23	24	Pos	Points
2019	Global Racing Group	OUL; 1 Ret	OUL; 2; 10^{5}	OUL; 3; 10	SNE; 1; 10	SNE; 2; 2^{5}	SNE; 3; 8	SIL1; 1; 18	SIL1; 2; 1	SIL1; 3; 10	DON1; 1; 9	DON1; 2; 5^{1}	DON1; 3; 10	SPA; 1; 12	SPA; 2; 6^{1}	SPA; 3; 17	BRH; 1; 10	BRH; 2; 13	BRH; 3; 14	SIL2; 1 Ret	SIL2; 2; 10^{7}	SIL2; 3; 16	DON2; 1	DON2; 2	DON2; 3	14th	200
2020	Double R Racing	OUL; 1; 11	OUL; 2; 4	OUL; 3; 12	OUL; 4; 15	DON1; 1; 9	DON1; 2; 5^{5}	DON1; 3; 7	BRH; 1; 8	BRH; 2; 6^{1}	BRH; 3; 9	BRH; 4; 10	DON2; 1; 6	DON2; 2; 15	DON2; 3; 9	SNE; 1 Ret	SNE; 2; 6^{11}	SNE; 3; 3	SNE; 4; 14	DON3; 1; 6	DON3; 2; 2^{1}	DON3; 3; 5	SIL; 1; 15	SIL; 2; 1^{2}	SIL; 3; 14	9th	299

=== American open-wheel racing results ===
(key)

==== Indy Lights ====
(key) (Races in bold indicate pole position) (Races in italics indicate fastest lap) (Races with ^{L} indicate a race lap led) (Races with * indicate most race laps led)

Year	Team	1	2	3	4	5	6	7	8	9	10	11	12	13	14	15	16	17	18	19	20	Rank	Points
2021	Global Racing Group with HMD Motorsports	ALA; 2	ALA; 7	STP; 10	STP; 6	IMS; 10	IMS; 9	DET; 11	DET; 6	RDA; 2	RDA; 7	MOH; 7	MOH; 8	GTW; 3	GTW; 3	POR; 4	POR; 4	LAG; 3	LAG; 5	MOH; 9	MOH; 3	4th	356
2022	Global Racing Group with HMD Motorsports	STP; 2	ALA; 2	IMS; 11	IMS; 4	DET; 2	DET; 6	RDA; 11	MOH; 6	IOW; 9	NSH; 6	GTW; 3	**POR**; 1^{L}*	LAG; 5	LAG; 6							5th	444

==== IndyCar Series ====
(key) (Races in bold indicate pole position; races in italics indicate fastest lap)

Year	Team	No.	Chassis	Engine	1	2	3	4	5	6	7	8	9	10	11	12	13	14	15	16	17	Rank	Points	Ref
2023	A.J. Foyt Enterprises	55	Dallara DW12	Chevrolet	STP; 27	TXS; 15	LBH; 24	ALA; 22	IMS; 24	INDY; 21	DET; 20	ROA; 21	MOH; 26	TOR; 27	IOW; 27	IOW; 27	NSH; 23	IMS; 26	GTW; 28	POR; 22	LAG; 16	27th	129	

==== Indianapolis 500 ====
Year	Chassis	Engine	Start	Finish	Team
2023	Dallara	Chevrolet	11	21	A. J. Foyt Racing

=== Complete European Le Mans Series results ===
Year	Entrant	Class	Chassis	Engine	1	2	3	4	5	6	Rank	Points
2024	Nielsen Racing	LMP2	Oreca 07	Gibson GK428 4.2 L V8	CAT	LEC	IMO	SPA; 13	MUG; 10	ALG; 11	22nd	1
2025	Duqueine Team	LMP2	Oreca 07	Gibson GK428 4.2 L V8	CAT	LEC	IMO	SPA; 10	SIL; 11	ALG; Ret	18th	1

=== Complete IMSA SportsCar Championship results ===
(key) (Races in bold indicate pole position) (Races in italics indicate fastest lap)

Year	Entrant	Class	Make	Engine	1	2	3	4	5	6	7	8	9	10	Pos.	Points
2025	PR1/Mathiasen Motorsports	LMP2	Oreca 07	Gibson GK428 V8	DAY; 3	SEB; 9	WGL; 12	MOS; 5	ELK; 13	IMS; 8	PET; 4				10th	1826
2026	Vasser Sullivan Racing	GTD	Lexus RC F GT3	Toyota 2UR-GSE 5.0 L V8	DAY; 9	SEB; 12	LBH; 1	LGA; 6	**WGL**; 4	MOS; 2	ELK; 9	VIR; 9	IMS; 8	PET; 11	4th	2677

Sporting positions
Preceded by Jimmie Johnson	Indianapolis 500; Rookie of the Year; 2023	Succeeded by Kyle Larson
