= 2025 Focused Health 250 (COTA) =

3rd race of the 2025 NASCAR Xfinity Series

Race details
- Race 3 of 33 of the 2025 NASCAR Xfinity Series
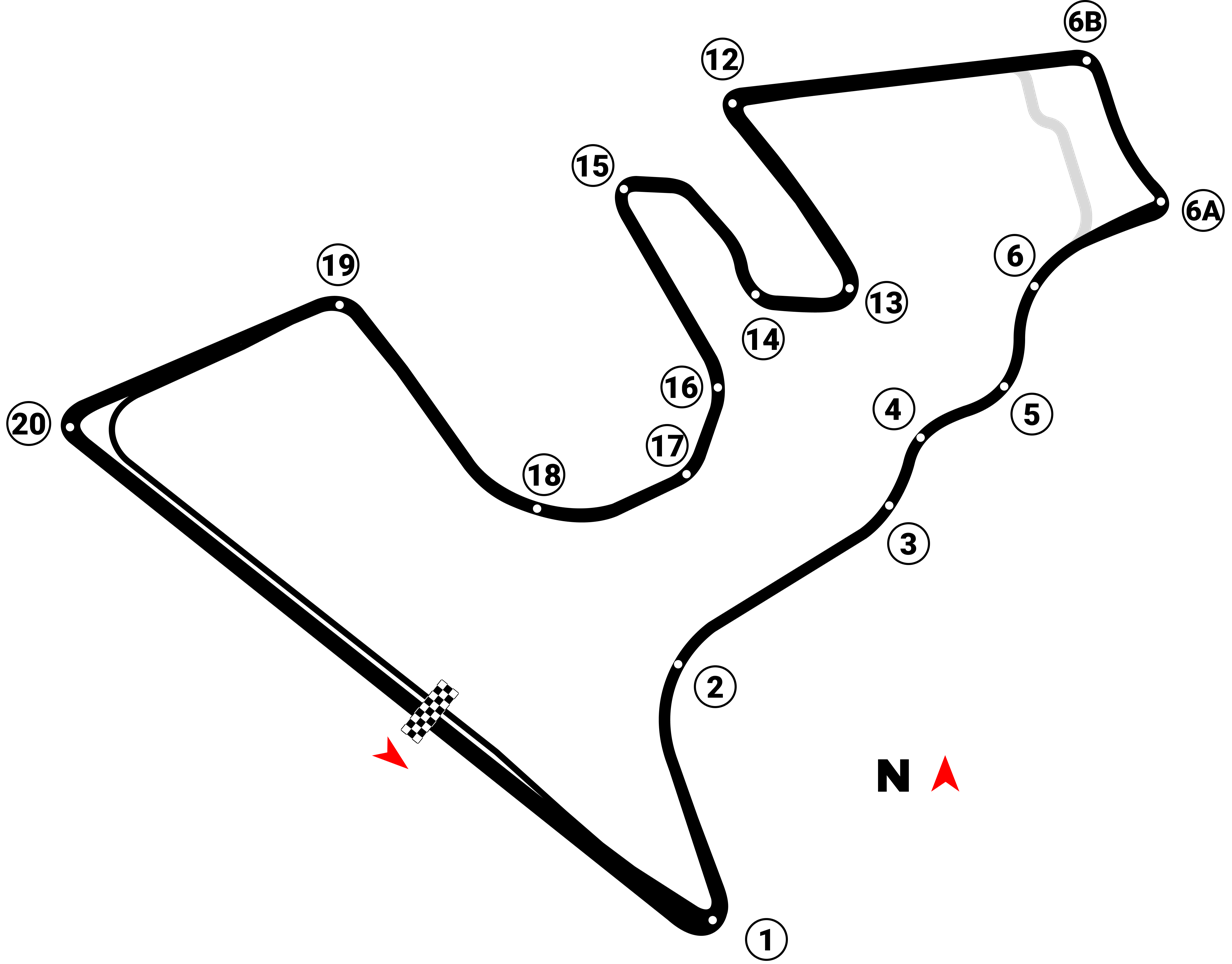
- Date: March 1, 2025
- Official name: 5th Annual Focused Health 250
- Location: Circuit of the Americas in Austin, Texas
- Course: Permanent racing facility
- Course length: 2.400 miles (3.792 km)
- Distance: 65 laps, 156 mi (251 km)
- Scheduled distance: 65 laps, 156 mi (251 km)
- Average speed: 70.095 mph (112.807 km/h)

Pole position
Driver	Connor Zilisch	JR Motorsports
- Time: 1:37.262

Most laps led
Driver	Connor Zilisch	JR Motorsports
- Laps: 26

Winner
No. 88	Connor Zilisch	JR Motorsports

Television in the United States
- Network: The CW
- Announcers: Adam Alexander, Jamie McMurray, and Parker Kligerman

Radio in the United States
- Radio: PRN

The 2025 Focused Health 250 was the 3rd stock car race of the 2025 NASCAR Xfinity Series, and the 5th iteration of the event. The race was held on Saturday, March 1, 2025, at Circuit of the Americas in Austin, Texas, a 2.400 miles (3.862 km) road course. The race took the scheduled 65 laps to complete.

Connor Zilisch, driving for JR Motorsports, navigated through late-race adversity, and continued his road course dominance by winning the pole and leading a race-high 26 laps, earning his second career NASCAR Xfinity Series win, and his first of the season. To fill out the podium, William Byron, driving for Hendrick Motorsports, and Sam Mayer, driving for Haas Factory Team, would finish 2nd and 3rd, respectively.

== Report ==
=== Background ===
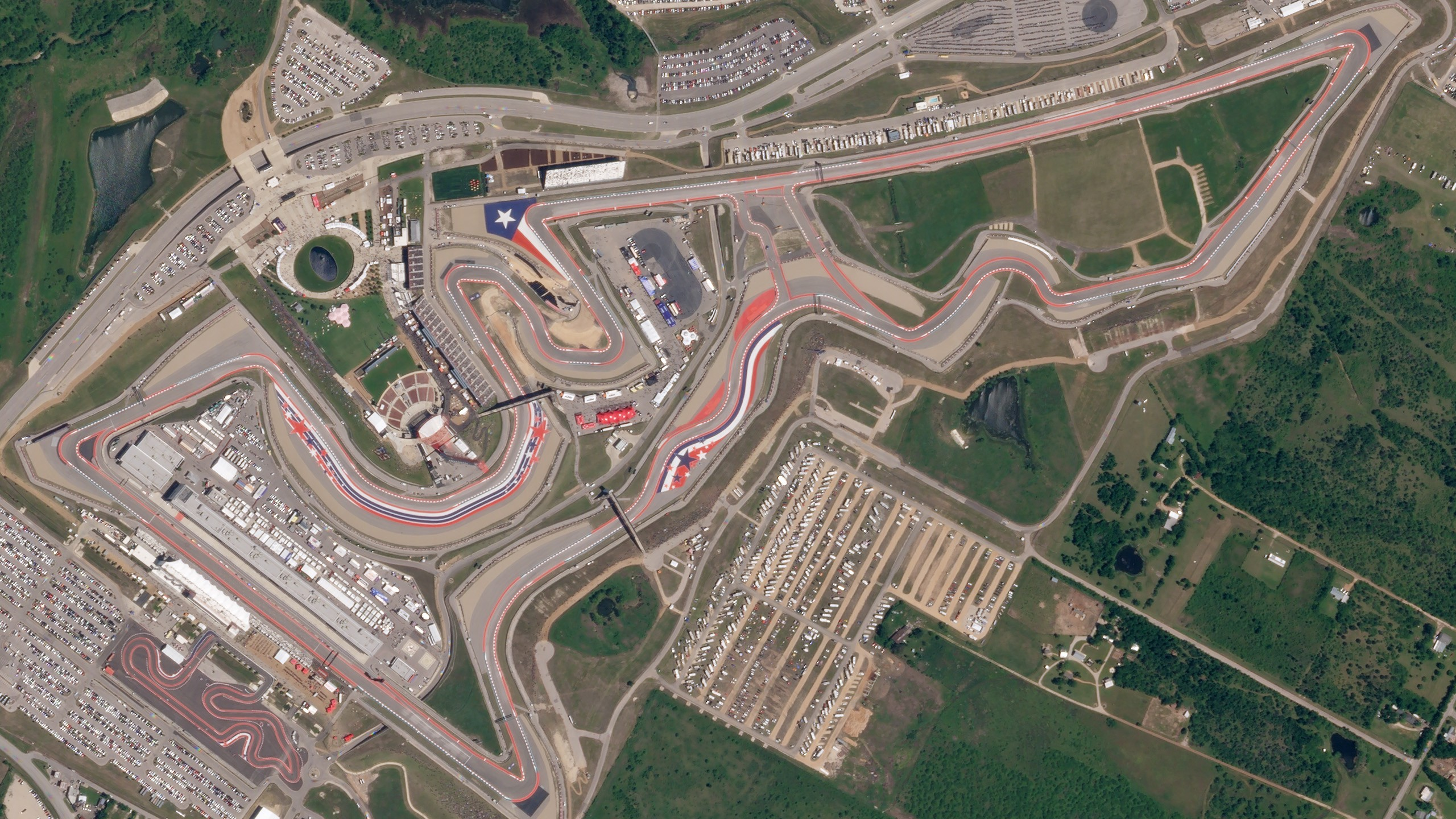
Aerial view of Circuit of the Americas, the track where the race will be held.

Circuit of the Americas (COTA) is a grade 1 FIA-specification motorsports facility located within the extraterritorial jurisdiction of Austin, Texas. It features a 3.426-mile (5.514 km) road racing circuit. The facility is home to the Formula One United States Grand Prix, and the Motorcycle Grand Prix of the Americas, a round of the FIM Road Racing World Championship. It previously hosted the Supercars Championship, the FIA World Endurance Championship, the IMSA SportsCar Championship, and IndyCar Series.

On November 20, 2024, it was announced that the race would move to the 2.400 mi (3.862 km) layout.

==== Entry list ====
- (R) denotes rookie driver.
- (i) denotes driver who is ineligible for series driver points.

#	Driver	Team	Make
00	Sheldon Creed	Haas Factory Team	Ford
1	Carson Kvapil (R)	JR Motorsports	Chevrolet
2	Jesse Love	Richard Childress Racing	Chevrolet
4	Parker Retzlaff	Alpha Prime Racing	Chevrolet
5	Kris Wright	Our Motorsports	Chevrolet
07	Alex Labbé	SS-Green Light Racing	Chevrolet
7	Justin Allgaier	JR Motorsports	Chevrolet
8	Sammy Smith	JR Motorsports	Chevrolet
9	Ross Chastain (i)	JR Motorsports	Chevrolet
10	Daniel Dye (R)	Kaulig Racing	Chevrolet
11	Josh Williams	Kaulig Racing	Chevrolet
14	Carson Hocevar (i)	SS-Green Light Racing	Chevrolet
16	Christian Eckes (R)	Kaulig Racing	Chevrolet
17	William Byron (i)	Hendrick Motorsports	Chevrolet
18	William Sawalich (R)	Joe Gibbs Racing	Toyota
19	Riley Herbst (i)	Joe Gibbs Racing	Toyota
20	Brandon Jones	Joe Gibbs Racing	Toyota
21	Austin Hill	Richard Childress Racing	Chevrolet
24	Corey Heim (i)	Sam Hunt Racing	Toyota
25	Harrison Burton	AM Racing	Ford
26	Dean Thompson (R)	Sam Hunt Racing	Toyota
27	Jeb Burton	Jordan Anderson Racing	Chevrolet
28	Kyle Sieg	RSS Racing	Ford
31	Blaine Perkins	Jordan Anderson Racing	Chevrolet
32	Austin Green	Jordan Anderson Racing	Chevrolet
35	Baltazar Leguizamón	Joey Gase Motorsports	Chevrolet
39	Ryan Sieg	RSS Racing	Ford
41	Sam Mayer	Haas Factory Team	Ford
42	Anthony Alfredo	Young's Motorsports	Chevrolet
44	Brennan Poole	Alpha Prime Racing	Chevrolet
45	Brad Perez	Alpha Prime Racing	Chevrolet
48	Nick Sanchez (R)	Big Machine Racing	Chevrolet
50	Preston Pardus	Pardus Racing	Chevrolet
51	Jeremy Clements	Jeremy Clements Racing	Chevrolet
53	Sage Karam	Joey Gase Motorsports	Toyota
54	Taylor Gray (R)	Joe Gibbs Racing	Toyota
70	Thomas Annunziata	Cope Family Racing	Chevrolet
71	Ryan Ellis	DGM Racing	Chevrolet
88	Connor Zilisch (R)	JR Motorsports	Chevrolet
91	Josh Bilicki	DGM Racing	Chevrolet
99	Matt DiBenedetto	Viking Motorsports	Chevrolet
Official entry list

== Practice ==
The first and only practice session was held on Friday, February 28, at 4:00 PM CST, and lasted for 50 minutes. Connor Zilisch, driving for JR Motorsports, would set the fastest time in the session, with a lap of 1:37.839, and a speed of 88.308 mph (142.118 km/h).

Pos.	#	Driver	Team	Make	Time	Speed
1	88	Connor Zilisch (R)	JR Motorsports	Chevrolet	1:37.839	88.308
2	2	Jesse Love	Richard Childress Racing	Chevrolet	1:38.392	87.812
3	21	Austin Hill	Richard Childress Racing	Chevrolet	1:38.634	87.597
Full practice results

== Qualifying ==
Qualifying was held on Friday, February 28, at 5:00 PM CST. Since Circuit of the Americas is a road course, the qualifying procedure used is a two group, one round system. Drivers will be separated into two groups, Group A and B. Both groups will be 20 minutes long, and each driver will have multiple laps to set a time. Whoever sets the fastest time between both groups will win the pole.

Under a 2021 rule change, the timing line in road course qualifying is "not" the start-finish line. Instead, the timing line for qualifying will be set at the exit of Istanbul 8. Connor Zilisch, driving for JR Motorsports, would score the pole for the race, with a lap of 1:37.262, and a speed of 88.832 mph (142.961 km/h).

Three drivers failed to qualify: Brad Perez, Parker Retzlaff, and Thomas Annunziata.

=== Qualifying results ===
Pos.	#	Driver	Team	Make	Time	Speed
1	88	Connor Zilisch (R)	JR Motorsports	Chevrolet	1:37.262	88.832
2	9	Ross Chastain (i)	JR Motorsports	Chevrolet	1:37.446	88.664
3	17	William Byron (i)	Hendrick Motorsports	Chevrolet	1:38.236	87.951
4	7	Justin Allgaier	JR Motorsports	Chevrolet	1:38.390	87.814
5	1	Carson Kvapil (R)	JR Motorsports	Chevrolet	1:38.485	87.729
6	24	Corey Heim (i)	Sam Hunt Racing	Toyota	1:38.540	87.680
7	54	Taylor Gray (R)	Joe Gibbs Racing	Toyota	1:38.564	87.659
8	41	Sam Mayer	Haas Factory Team	Ford	1:38.603	87.624
9	19	Riley Herbst (i)	Joe Gibbs Racing	Toyota	1:38.613	87.615
10	16	Christian Eckes (R)	Kaulig Racing	Chevrolet	1:38.742	87.501
11	2	Jesse Love	Richard Childress Racing	Chevrolet	1:38.841	87.413
12	21	Austin Hill	Richard Childress Racing	Chevrolet	1:38.852	87.403
13	20	Brandon Jones	Joe Gibbs Racing	Toyota	1:38.887	87.372
14	00	Sheldon Creed	Haas Factory Team	Ford	1:39.008	87.266
15	10	Daniel Dye (R)	Kaulig Racing	Chevrolet	1:39.095	87.189
16	8	Sammy Smith	JR Motorsports	Chevrolet	1:39.115	87.171
17	42	Anthony Alfredo	Young's Motorsports	Chevrolet	1:39.196	87.100
18	31	Blaine Perkins	Jordan Anderson Racing	Chevrolet	1:39.247	87.056
19	48	Nick Sanchez (R)	Big Machine Racing	Chevrolet	1:39.248	87.055
20	32	Austin Green	Jordan Anderson Racing	Chevrolet	1:39.313	86.998
21	11	Josh Williams	Kaulig Racing	Chevrolet	1:39.431	86.894
22	99	Matt DiBenedetto	Viking Motorsports	Chevrolet	1:39.439	86.887
23	18	William Sawalich (R)	Joe Gibbs Racing	Toyota	1:39.490	86.843
24	14	Carson Hocevar (i)	SS-Green Light Racing	Chevrolet	1:39.572	86.771
25	50	Preston Pardus	Pardus Racing	Chevrolet	1:39.834	86.544
26	91	Josh Bilicki	DGM Racing	Chevrolet	1:39.991	86.408
27	07	Alex Labbé	SS-Green Light Racing	Chevrolet	1:40.058	86.350
28	53	Sage Karam	Joey Gase Motorsports	Chevrolet	1:40.093	86.320
29	27	Jeb Burton	Jordan Anderson Racing	Chevrolet	1:40.214	86.215
30	26	Dean Thompson (R)	Sam Hunt Racing	Toyota	1:40.244	86.190
31	25	Harrison Burton	AM Racing	Ford	1:40.367	86.084
32	44	Brennan Poole	Alpha Prime Racing	Chevrolet	1:40.431	86.029
Qualified by owner's points
33	5	Kris Wright	Our Motorsports	Chevrolet	1:40.527	85.947
34	71	Ryan Ellis	DGM Racing	Chevrolet	1:40.563	85.916
35	51	Jeremy Clements	Jeremy Clements Racing	Chevrolet	1:40.677	85.819
36	28	Kyle Sieg	RSS Racing	Ford	1:41.269	85.317
37	35	Baltazar Leguizamón	Joey Gase Motorsports	Chevrolet	1:42.090	84.631
38	39	Ryan Sieg	RSS Racing	Ford	—	—
Failed to qualify
39	45	Brad Perez	Alpha Prime Racing	Chevrolet	1:40.599	85.886
40	4	Parker Retzlaff	Alpha Prime Racing	Chevrolet	1:41.057	85.496
41	70	Thomas Annunziata	Cope Family Racing	Chevrolet	—	—
Official qualifying results
Official starting lineup

== Race results ==
Stage 1 Laps: 20

Pos.	#	Driver	Team	Make	Pts
1	17	William Byron (i)	Hendrick Motorsports	Chevrolet	0
2	9	Ross Chastain (i)	JR Motorsports	Chevrolet	0
3	24	Corey Heim (i)	Sam Hunt Racing	Toyota	0
4	41	Sam Mayer	Haas Factory Team	Ford	7
5	7	Justin Allgaier	JR Motorsports	Chevrolet	6
6	21	Austin Hill	Richard Childress Racing	Chevrolet	5
7	16	Christian Eckes (R)	Kaulig Racing	Chevrolet	4
8	8	Sammy Smith	JR Motorsports	Chevrolet	3
9	42	Anthony Alfredo	Young's Motorsports	Chevrolet	2
10	07	Alex Labbé	SS-Green Light Racing	Chevrolet	1

Stage 2 Laps: 20

Pos.	#	Driver	Team	Make	Pts
1	25	Harrison Burton	AM Racing	Ford	10
2	10	Daniel Dye (R)	Kaulig Racing	Chevrolet	9
3	8	Sammy Smith	JR Motorsports	Chevrolet	8
4	27	Jeb Burton	Jordan Anderson Racing	Chevrolet	7
5	39	Ryan Sieg	RSS Racing	Ford	6
6	44	Brennan Poole	Alpha Prime Racing	Chevrolet	5
7	07	Alex Labbé	SS-Green Light Racing	Chevrolet	4
8	11	Josh Williams	Kaulig Racing	Chevrolet	3
9	53	Sage Karam	Joey Gase Motorsports	Toyota	2
10	28	Kyle Sieg	RSS Racing	Ford	1

Stage 3 Laps: 25

Fin	St	#	Driver	Team	Make	Laps	Led	Status	Pts
1	1	88	Connor Zilisch (R)	JR Motorsports	Chevrolet	65	26	Running	40
2	3	17	William Byron (i)	Hendrick Motorsports	Chevrolet	65	3	Running	0
3	8	41	Sam Mayer	Haas Factory Team	Ford	65	0	Running	41
4	12	21	Austin Hill	Richard Childress Racing	Chevrolet	65	6	Running	38
5	10	16	Christian Eckes (R)	Kaulig Racing	Chevrolet	65	0	Running	36
6	11	2	Jesse Love	Richard Childress Racing	Chevrolet	65	6	Running	31
7	7	54	Taylor Gray (R)	Joe Gibbs Racing	Toyota	65	3	Running	30
8	2	9	Ross Chastain (i)	JR Motorsports	Chevrolet	65	2	Running	0
9	23	18	William Sawalich (R)	Joe Gibbs Racing	Toyota	65	0	Running	28
10	18	31	Blaine Perkins	Jordan Anderson Racing	Chevrolet	65	0	Running	27
11	16	8	Sammy Smith	JR Motorsports	Chevrolet	65	0	Running	37
12	14	00	Sheldon Creed	Haas Factory Team	Ford	65	0	Running	25
13	9	19	Riley Herbst (i)	Joe Gibbs Racing	Toyota	65	7	Running	0
14	27	07	Alex Labbé	SS-Green Light Racing	Chevrolet	65	0	Running	28
15	21	11	Josh Williams	Kaulig Racing	Chevrolet	65	0	Running	25
16	34	71	Ryan Ellis	DGM Racing	Chevrolet	65	0	Running	21
17	15	10	Daniel Dye (R)	Kaulig Racing	Chevrolet	65	0	Running	29
18	30	26	Dean Thompson (R)	Sam Hunt Racing	Toyota	65	0	Running	19
19	38	39	Ryan Sieg	RSS Racing	Ford	65	0	Running	24
20	32	44	Brennan Poole	Alpha Prime Racing	Chevrolet	65	0	Running	22
21	17	42	Anthony Alfredo	Young's Motorsports	Chevrolet	65	0	Running	18
22	26	91	Josh Bilicki	DGM Racing	Chevrolet	65	0	Running	15
23	5	1	Carson Kvapil (R)	JR Motorsports	Chevrolet	65	7	Running	15
24	19	48	Nick Sanchez (R)	Big Machine Racing	Chevrolet	65	0	Running	13
25	29	27	Jeb Burton	Jordan Anderson Racing	Chevrolet	65	0	Running	19
26	20	32	Austin Green	Jordan Anderson Racing	Chevrolet	65	0	Running	11
27	36	28	Kyle Sieg	RSS Racing	Ford	65	0	Running	11
28	35	51	Jeremy Clements	Jeremy Clements Racing	Chevrolet	65	0	Running	9
29	4	7	Justin Allgaier	JR Motorsports	Chevrolet	65	0	Running	14
30	13	20	Brandon Jones	Joe Gibbs Racing	Toyota	65	0	Running	7
31	6	24	Corey Heim (i)	Sam Hunt Racing	Toyota	65	0	Running	0
32	22	99	Matt DiBenedetto	Viking Motorsports	Chevrolet	65	0	Running	5
33	33	5	Kris Wright	Our Motorsports	Chevrolet	64	0	Running	4
34	28	53	Sage Karam	Joey Gase Motorsports	Toyota	58	0	Transmission	5
35	31	25	Harrison Burton	AM Racing	Ford	55	5	Axle	12
36	25	50	Preston Pardus	Pardus Racing	Chevrolet	26	0	Rear End	1
37	37	35	Baltazar Leguizamón	Joey Gase Motorsports	Chevrolet	17	0	Suspension	1
38	24	14	Carson Hocevar (i)	SS-Green Light Racing	Chevrolet	3	0	Accident	0
Official race results

== Standings after the race ==
Drivers' Championship standings

	Pos	Driver	Points
	1	Austin Hill	122
1	2	Jesse Love	109 (–13)
1	3	Sheldon Creed	108 (–14)
4	4	Sam Mayer	94 (–28)
1	5	Justin Allgaier	90 (–32)
5	6	Sammy Smith	87 (–35)
2	7	Jeb Burton	85 (–37)
5	8	Taylor Gray	75 (–47)
11	9	Christian Eckes	74 (–48)
4	10	Harrison Burton	73 (–49)
2	11	Carson Kvapil	68 (–54)
5	12	William Sawalich	68 (–54)
Official driver's standings

Manufacturers' Championship standings

	Pos	Manufacturer	Points
	1	Chevrolet	120
1	2	Ford	96 (–24)
1	3	Toyota	96 (–24)

- Note: Only the first 12 positions are included for the driver standings.

Previous race: 2025 Bennett Transportation & Logistics 250	NASCAR Xfinity Series; 2025 season	Next race: 2025 GOVX 200
