= Jacob Abel (racing driver) =

American racing driver (born 2001)

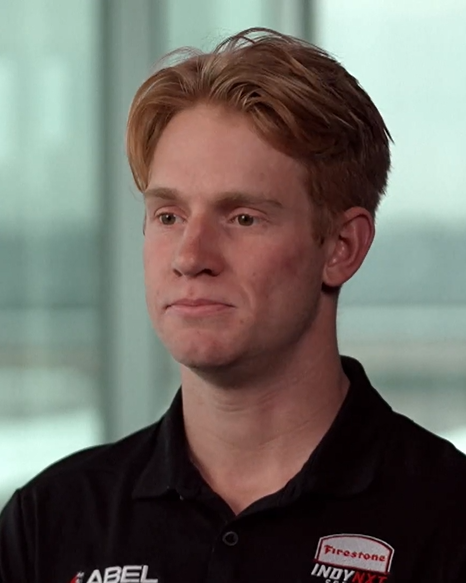
- Abel in 2024
- Nationality: (United States) American
- Born: William Jacob Abel; March 9, 2001 (age 25) Louisville, Kentucky, U.S.
- Categorisation: FIA Silver

IndyCar Series career
- 17 races run over 2 years
- Team: No. 51 (Abel Motorsports)
- Best finish: 27th (2025)
- First race: 2025 Firestone Grand Prix of St. Petersburg (St. Petersburg)
- Last race: 2026 Indianapolis 500 (Indianapolis)
Wins	Podiums	Poles
0	0	0

Previous series
- 2022–24, 2026 2021 2021 2021 2020–21 2019–21 2017–18 2017–18: Indy NXT; GT World Challenge America; IMSA SportsCar Championship; Stadium Super Trucks; FR Americas; Indy Pro 2000; F4 United States; USF2000

William Jacob Abel (born March 9, 2001) is an American racing driver who competes in the IMSA SportsCar Championship in LMP2 for Era Motorsport. He has competed in the IndyCar Series for Dale Coyne Racing full-time in 2025, and Abel Motorsports at the Indianapolis 500 in 2026. He previously competed in Indy Lights/Indy NXT for Abel Motorsports between 2022 and 2024, with a one-off weekend in 2026.

== Junior racing career ==
=== Lower formulae ===
Abel began his senior racing career in 2017 at the age of sixteen, competing in the F4 United States Championship with Abel Motorsports. The following season, Abel stepped back to a partial-season schedule in both the F4 United States Championship and the new-for-2018 F3 Americas Championship. Abel would score four podiums in his opening season in F3, en route to a fourth place championship finish. He took his first win in the series early the following season, scoring back-to-back victories at Road Atlanta.

In 2023, Abel stepped outside of North America for the first time in his racing career, taking part in the 2023 Formula Regional Oceania Championship with Kiwi Motorsport. He claimed four podium finishes, completing the season with a third place championship finish. He returned to the series in 2024, making his first appearance during Round 4 at Euromarque Motorsport Park.

=== Road to Indy ===
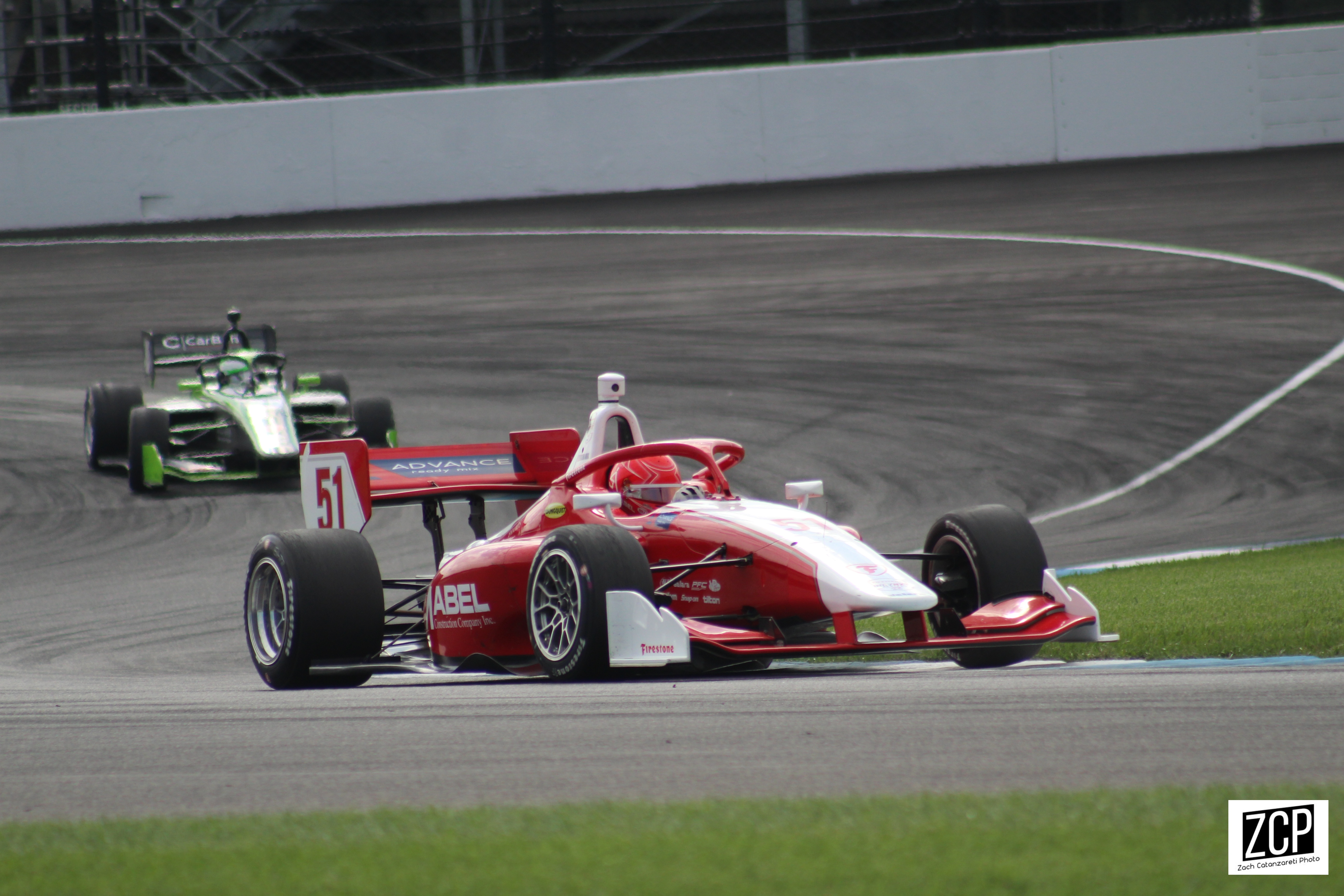
Abel at the Indy NXT race at Indianapolis in 2023

Abel made his Road to Indy debut in July 2017 at Mid-Ohio, driving for Newman Wachs Racing. After a part-time schedule in the series for 2018, Abel stepped up to the Indy Pro 2000 Championship in 2019. His opening season in the championship was quiet, as he finished ninth overall with no podiums and two top-fives. He would compete in just seven races in 2020 to supplement a full-season drive in the Formula Regional Americas Championship, scoring his first Indy Pro 2000 podium at Mid-Ohio that September.

For 2021, Abel committed to a full-time schedule in Indy Pro 2000. Claiming two podiums, one each at Road America and Mid-Ohio, Abel finished his first full season sixth in the standings.

For 2022, Abel stepped up to Indy Lights, once again with Abel Motorsports. He finished eighth in the championship during his rookie season, finishing as high as fourth at Portland and Laguna Seca. For 2023, Abel returned to the series. He scored his first series podium in the opening race of the season at St. Petersburg, leading 27 of 40 laps before dropping to third on a late restart. He would finish a season-high second at Road America and Iowa (where he claimed pole), finishing fifth in the championship. In November 2023, Abel embarked on an IndyCar test with Dale Coyne Racing.

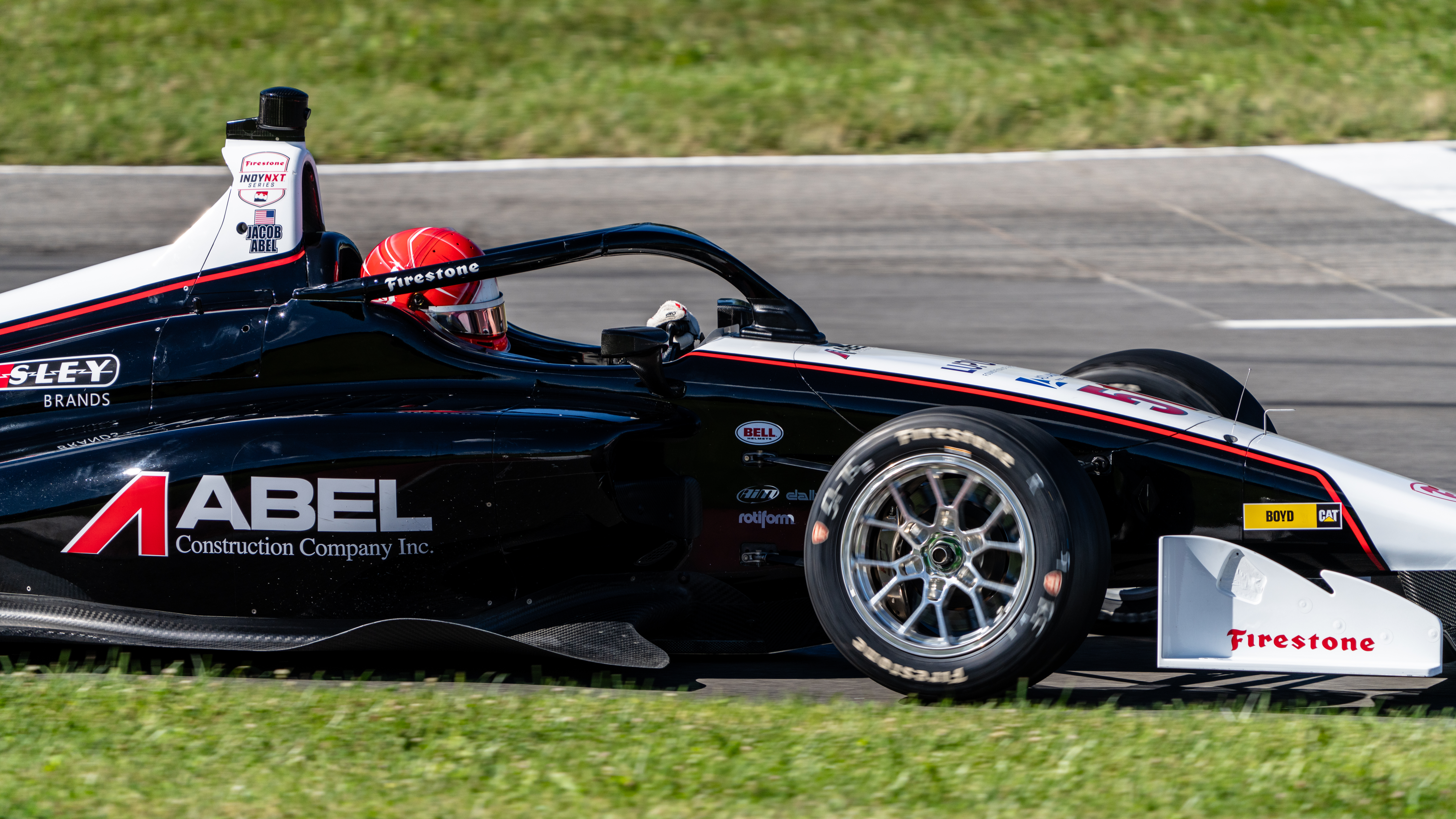
Abel in practice for the Indy NXT race at Mid-Ohio in 2024

Abel and his family's team returned for his third year in the series in 2024. Following a second place at the season-opener in St. Petersburg, Abel took pole at Barber, from where he led every lap to take his first victory in the category. Abel followed that up with another lights-to-flag victory at Indianapolis, and claimed his third and final race win of the season later in the year at Portland. Abel finished the 2024 season second in the championship, with a career-high three wins, ten podiums, and three pole positions.

Abel returned to Indy NXT in 2026 as a replacement for Jordan Missig at his family's team for the final four races of the season.

== IndyCar Series ==
In November 2024, Abel took part in an IndyCar test at Texas Motor Speedway, driving with Chip Ganassi Racing. During the test, Abel made a strong impression on Ganassi's managing director Mike Hull, who advocated for Abel to land a seat in the series for 2025. On January 13, 2025, it was announced that Abel would make the step up to the NTT IndyCar Series to compete full time in the No. 51 Honda for Dale Coyne Racing. Following a difficult season where he placed lowest of the full-time drivers — 48 points behind nearest driver Devlin DeFrancesco, Abel was dropped at the end of the season to make way for reigning Indy NXT champion Dennis Hauger. Abel also competed that year in a driver shootout with his then Dale Coyne Racing teammate Rinus VeeKay, for a spot among the 2025 Indy 500 starting lineup, which he ultimately lost to VeeKay.

On April 20, 2026, it was announced that Abel will compete in the 2026 Indianapolis 500 for Abel Motorsports.

== Sportscar racing career ==
=== 2021 ===
In March 2021, Abel was announced as part of HPD's 2021 Junior Factory Lineup. As a result, Abel would compete part-time with Racers Edge Motorsports in the GT World Challenge America. Later that season, Abel joined Compass Racing for the IMSA SportsCar Championship event at WeatherTech Raceway Laguna Seca, substituting for Jeff Kingsley. The following weekend, Abel scored his first class victory in GT3 machinery in race #1 of the GT World Challenge America event at Watkins Glen.

=== 2026 ===
After losing his IndyCar seat, Abel joined the IMSA Sportscar Championship to contest the endurance rounds, driving for Era Motorsport in the LMP2 category.

== Other racing ==
=== Stadium Super Trucks (2021) ===
In August 2021, Abel made his Stadium Super Trucks debut at the Music City Grand Prix, where he drove a truck sponsored by Crosley Brands. He finished runner-up in the second and final race of the weekend.

== Personal life ==
A graduate of Trinity High School in Louisville, Abel attended college part-time at Butler University while pursuing his racing career. A marketing major, Abel stated that his education helped him understand the financial and business aspects of motorsports.

== Racing record ==
=== Career summary ===
Season	Series	Team	Races	Wins	Poles	F/Laps	Podiums	Points	Position
2017	Formula 4 United States Championship	Abel Motorsports	19	0	0	0	0	9	24th
2017	U.S. F2000 National Championship	Newman Wachs Racing	2	0	0	0	0	14	31st
2018	F3 Americas Championship	Abel Motorsports	11	0	0	0	4	124	4th
2018	Formula 4 United States Championship	Abel Motorsports	12	0	0	0	0	24	15th
2018	U.S. F2000 National Championship	Abel Motorsports	5	0	0	0	0	47	23rd
2019	F3 Americas Championship	Abel Motorsports	11	2	0	3	8	155	4th
2019	Indy Pro 2000 Championship	Abel Motorsports	14	0	0	0	0	198	9th
2020	Formula Regional Americas Championship	Abel Motorsports	17	0	0	0	1	133	5th
2020	Indy Pro 2000 Championship	Abel Motorsports	7	0	0	0	1	107	14th
2021	Indy Pro 2000 Championship	Abel Motorsports	18	0	0	3	2	292	6th
2021	Formula Regional Americas Championship	Newman Wachs Racing	3	1	0	1	2	43	13th
2021	Stadium Super Trucks	Crosley Brands	3	0	0	0	1	39	14th
2021	GT World Challenge America - Pro-Am	Racers Edge Motorsports	6	1	0	0	2	66	14th
2021	IMSA SportsCar Championship - GTD	Compass Racing	1	0	0	0	0	204	65th
2022	Indy Lights	Abel Motorsports	14	0	0	0	0	355	8th
2023	Formula Regional Oceania Championship	Kiwi Motorsport	15	0	0	0	4	265	**3rd**
2023	Indy NXT	Abel Motorsports	14	0	1	0	4	397	5th
2024	Indy NXT	Abel Motorsports	14	3	3	3	10	517	**2nd**
2024	Formula Regional Oceania Championship	mtec Motorsport	6	0	0	0	1	118	13th
2025	IndyCar Series	Dale Coyne Racing	16	0	0	0	0	123	27th
2025–26	Asian Le Mans Series - LMP2	Vector Sport RLR	6	0	0	0	0	18	16th
2026	IMSA SportsCar Championship - LMP2	Era Motorsport	5	0	0	1	2	1420	20th
2026	IndyCar Series	Abel Motorsports	1	0	0	0	0	6	29th
2026	Indy NXT	Abel Motorsports	4	0	0	1	0	101	25th

* Season still in progress.

=== Complete Formula 4 United States Championship results ===
(key) (Races in bold indicate pole position) (Races in italics indicate fastest lap)

Year	Entrant	1	2	3	4	5	6	7	8	9	10	11	12	13	14	15	16	17	18	19	20	DC	Points
2017	Abel Motorsports	HMS; 1; 24	HMS; 2 Ret	HMS; 3 DNS	IMS; 1; 10	IMS; 2; 25	IMS; 3; 8	MSP; 1; 14	MSP; 2; 17	MSP; 3; 12	MOH; 1; 9	MOH; 2; 10	MOH; 3; 12	VIR; 1; 15	VIR; 2; 14	VIR; 3; 13	COTA1; 1; 20	COTA1; 2; 15	COTA1; 3; 10	COTA2; 1; 12	COTA2; 2; 29	24th	9
2018	Abel Motorsports	VIR; 1; 23	VIR; 2; 7	VIR; 3; 7	ROA; 1; 12	ROA; 2; 11	ROA; 3; 8	MOH; 1; 11	MOH; 2; 6	MOH; 3 Ret	PIT; 1; 15	PIT; 2; 12	PIT; 3; 13	NJMP; 1 WD	NJMP; 2 WD	NJMP; 3 WD	COTA; 1	COTA; 2				15th	24

=== Complete Formula Regional Americas results ===
(key) (Races in bold indicate pole position) (Races in italics indicate fastest lap)

Year	Entrant	1	2	3	4	5	6	7	8	9	10	11	12	13	14	15	16	17	DC	Points
2018	Abel Motorsports	PIT; 1	PIT; 2	PIT; 3	MOH; 1	MOH; 2	MOH; 3	NJM; 1; 3	NJM; 2; 3	NJM; 3; 3	ROA; 1; 5	ROA; 2; 4	ROA; 3; 4	NOL; 1 Ret	NOL; 2; 5	NOL; 3; 3	COTA; 1; 6	COTA; 2; 4	4th	124
2019	Abel Motorsports	BAR; 1; 3	BAR; 2; 4	ATL; 1; 1	ATL; 2; 1	ATL; 3; 3	PIT; 1; 3	PIT; 2; 3	PIT; 3; 11	VIR; 1	VIR; 2	VIR; 3	ROA; 1	ROA; 2	SEB; 1; 2	SEB; 2 Ret	SEB; 3; 3		4th	155
2020	Abel Motorsports	MOH; 1; 6	MOH; 2; 6	VIR; 1; 6	VIR; 2; 9	VIR; 3 Ret	BAR; 1; 7	BAR; 2; 5	BAR; 3 Ret	SEB; 1; 5	SEB; 2; 3	SEB; 3; 5	HMS; 1; 7	HMS; 2; 5	HMS; 3; 8	COA; 1; 4	COA; 2; 4	COA; 3; 5	5th	133

=== American open–wheel racing results ===
==== U.S. F2000 National Championship ====
Year	Team	1	2	3	4	5	6	7	8	9	10	11	12	13	14	Rank	Points
2017	Newman Wachs Racing	STP	STP	BAR	BAR	IMS	IMS	ROA	ROA	IOW	TOR	TOR	MOH; 16	MOH; 13	WGL	31st	14
2018	Abel Motorsports	STP	STP	IMS	IMS	LOR	ROA; 15	ROA; 10	TOR	TOR	MOH; 11	MOH; 11	MOH; 11	POR	POR	23rd	47

==== Indy Pro 2000 Championship ====
Year	Team	1	2	3	4	5	6	7	8	9	10	11	12	13	14	15	16	17	18	Rank	Points
2019	Abel Motorsports	STP; 9	STP; 11	IMS; 6	IMS; 7	LOR; 5	ROA	ROA	TOR; 6	TOR; 7	MOH; 12	MOH; 10	GTW; 12	POR; 7	POR; 8	LAG; 7	LAG; 5			9th	198
2020	Abel Motorsports	ROA	ROA	MOH	MOH	MOH	LOR; 12	GMP; 10	IMS	IMS	IMS	MOH; 7	MOH; 3	NJM; 9	NJM; 6	NJM; 8	STP	STP		14th	107
2021	Abel Motorsports	ALA; 8	ALA; 5	STP; 15	STP; 7	IMS; 6	IMS; 7	IMS; 13	LOR; 6	ROA; 3	ROA; 5	MOH; 3	MOH; 6	GMP; 6	NJM; 5	NJM; 5	NJM; 4	MOH; 6	MOH; 9	6th	292

==== Indy NXT ====
Year	Team	1	2	3	4	5	6	7	8	9	10	11	12	13	14	15	16	17	Rank	Points
2022	Abel Motorsports	STP; 10	BAR; 6	IMS; 8	IMS; 5	DET; 14	DET; 12	RDA; 5	MOH; 11	IOW; 6	NSH; 9	GMP; 7	POR; 4	LAG; 4	LAG; 5				8th	355
2023	Abel Motorsports	STP; 3*	BAR; 16	IMS; 9	DET; 4	DET; 9	RDA; 2	MOH; 6	**IOW**; 2^{L}	NSH; 3	IMS; 4	GMP; 4	POR; 16	LAG; 14	LAG; 5				5th	397
2024	Abel Motorsports	STP; 2	**BAR**; 1*	**IMS**; 1*	**IMS**; 2	DET; 5	RDA; 3	LAG; 3	LAG; 11	MOH; 3	IOW; 15	GMP; 2	POR; 1*	MIL; 2	NSH; 8				2nd	517
2026	Abel Motorsports	STP	ARL	BAR	BAR	IMS	IMS	DET	GAT	ROA	ROA	MOH	MOH	NSS	POR; 5	MIL; 9	LAG; 13	LAG; 4	25th	101

==== IndyCar Series ====
(key)

Year	Team	No.	Chassis	Engine	1	2	3	4	5	6	7	8	9	10	11	12	13	14	15	16	17	18	Rank	Points	Ref
2025	Dale Coyne Racing	51	Dallara DW12	Honda	STP; 23	THE; 25	LBH; 26	ALA; 27	IMS; 24	INDY; DNQ	DET; 18	GTW; 21	ROA; 23	MOH; 22	IOW; 27	IOW; 11	TOR; 23	LAG; 26	POR; 23		NSH; 23		27th	123	
2025	Dale Coyne Racing	50	Dallara DW12	Honda																MIL; 21			27th	123	
2026	Abel Motorsports	51	Dallara DW12	Chevrolet	STP	PHX	ARL	ALA	LBH	IMS	INDY; 24	DET	GTW	ROA	MOH	NSH	POR	MRK	WSH	MIL	MIL	LAG	29th	6	

* Season still in progress.

===== Indianapolis 500 =====
Year	Chassis	Engine	Start	Finish	Team
2025	Dallara	Honda	DNQ		Dale Coyne Racing
2026	Dallara	Chevrolet	30	24	Abel Motorsports

=== Complete IMSA SportsCar Championship results ===
(key) (Races in bold indicate pole position)

Year	Team	Class	Make	Engine	1	2	3	4	5	6	7	8	9	10	11	12	Rank	Points
2021	Compass Racing	GTD	Acura NSX GT3 Evo	Acura 3.5 L Turbo V6	DAY	SEB	MOH	DET	WGL	WGL	LIM	ELK	LGA; 13	LBH	VIR	PET	65th	204
2026	Era Motorsport	LMP2	Oreca 07	Gibson GK428 4.2 L V8	DAY; 9	SEB; 4	WGL; 3	MOS	ELK; 10	IMS	PET; 3						20th	1420

=== Stadium Super Trucks ===
(key) (Bold – Pole position. Italics – Fastest qualifier. * – Most laps led.)

Stadium Super Trucks results
Year	1	2	3	4	5	6	7	8	9	10	SSTC	Pts	Ref
2021	STP	STP	MOH	MOH	MOH	MOH	NSH; 12	NSH; 2	LBH; 13	LBH; DNS	14th	39	

=== Complete Formula Regional Oceania Championship results ===
(key) (Races in bold indicate pole position) (Races in italics indicate fastest lap)

Year	Team	1	2	3	4	5	6	7	8	9	10	11	12	13	14	15	DC	Points
2023	Kiwi Motorsport	HIG; 1; 6	HIG; 2; 2	HIG; 3; 6	TER; 1; 3	TER; 2; 6	TER; 3; 5	MAN; 1; 3	MAN; 2; 4	MAN; 3; 4	HMP; 1; 7	HMP; 2; 2	HMP; 3; 8	TAU; 1 Ret	TAU; 2; 9	TAU; 3; 6	3rd	265
2024	mtec Motorsport	TAU; 1	TAU; 2	TAU; 3	MAN; 1	MAN; 2	MAN; 3	HMP; 1	HMP; 2	HMP; 3	RUA; 1; 3	RUA; 2; 7	RUA; 3; 5	HIG; 1; 5	HIG; 2; 4	HIG; 3; 4	13th	118

=== Complete Asian Le Mans Series results ===
(key) (Races in bold indicate pole position) (Races in italics indicate fastest lap)

Year	Team	Class	Car	Engine	1	2	3	4	5	6	Pos.	Points
2025–26	Vector Sport RLR	LMP2	Oreca 07	Gibson GK428 4.2 L V8	SEP; 1; 8	SEP; 2; 15	DUB; 1; 4	DUB; 2; 10	ABU; 1; 10	ABU; 2; 14	16th	18
