= 2023 Pit Boss 250 =

6th race of the 2023 NASCAR Xfinity Series

2023 Pit Boss 250 presented by USA Today
Race details
- Race 6 of 33 of the 2023 NASCAR Xfinity Series
- Date: March 25, 2023
- Official name: 3rd Annual Pit Boss 250
- Location: Circuit of the Americas, Austin, Texas
- Course: Permanent racing facility
- Course length: 3.426 miles (5.514 km)
- Distance: 46 laps, 157 mi (253 km)
- Scheduled distance: 46 laps, 157 mi (253 km)
- Average speed: 75.263 mph (121.124 km/h)

Pole position
Driver	A. J. Allmendinger	Kaulig Racing
- Time: 2:13.184

Most laps led
Driver	A. J. Allmendinger	Kaulig Racing
- Laps: 28

Winner
No. 10	A. J. Allmendinger	Kaulig Racing

Television in the United States
- Network: FS1
- Announcers: Adam Alexander, Brad Keselowski, and Joey Logano

Radio in the United States
- Radio: PRN

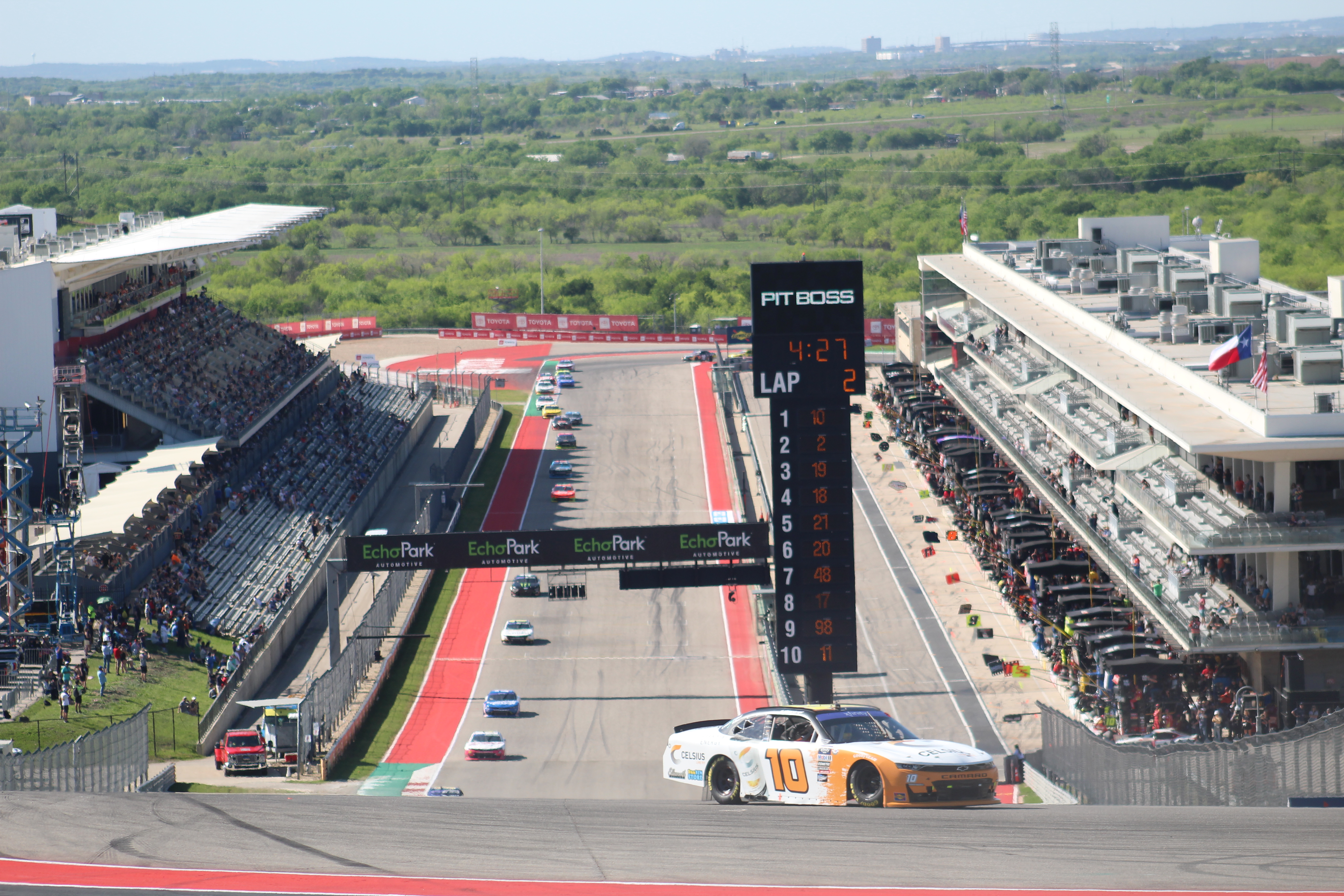

The 2023 Pit Boss 250 presented by USA Today was the 6th stock car race of the 2023 NASCAR Xfinity Series, and the 3rd iteration of the event. The race was held on Saturday, March 25, 2023, in Austin, Texas, at Circuit of the Americas, a 3.426 miles (5.514 km) permanent asphalt road course. The race completed the scheduled 46 laps. A. J. Allmendinger, driving for Kaulig Racing, would put on a dominating performance, leading 28 laps for his 16th career NASCAR Xfinity Series win, and his first of the season. To fill out the podium, William Byron, driving for Hendrick Motorsports, and Ty Gibbs, driving for Joe Gibbs Racing, would finish 2nd and 3rd, respectively.

== Background ==
Circuit of the Americas (COTA) is a grade 1 FIA-specification motorsports facility located within the extraterritorial jurisdiction of Austin, Texas. It features a 3.426-mile (5.514 km) road racing circuit. The facility is home to the Formula One United States Grand Prix, and the Motorcycle Grand Prix of the Americas, a round of the FIM Road Racing World Championship. It previously hosted the Supercars Championship, the FIA World Endurance Championship, the IMSA SportsCar Championship, and IndyCar Series.

=== Entry list ===
- (R) denotes rookie driver.
- (i) denotes driver who is ineligible for series driver points.

#	Driver	Team	Make
00	Cole Custer	Stewart-Haas Racing	Ford
1	Sam Mayer	JR Motorsports	Chevrolet
02	Kyle Weatherman	Our Motorsports	Chevrolet
2	Sheldon Creed	Richard Childress Racing	Chevrolet
4	Garrett Smithley	JD Motorsports	Chevrolet
6	Brennan Poole	JD Motorsports	Chevrolet
07	Carson Hocevar (i)	SS-Green Light Racing	Chevrolet
7	Justin Allgaier	JR Motorsports	Chevrolet
08	Aric Almirola (i)	SS-Green Light Racing	Ford
8	Josh Berry	JR Motorsports	Chevrolet
9	Brandon Jones	JR Motorsports	Chevrolet
10	A. J. Allmendinger (i)	Kaulig Racing	Chevrolet
11	Daniel Hemric	Kaulig Racing	Chevrolet
16	Chandler Smith (R)	Kaulig Racing	Chevrolet
17	William Byron (i)	Hendrick Motorsports	Chevrolet
18	Sammy Smith (R)	Joe Gibbs Racing	Toyota
19	Ty Gibbs (i)	Joe Gibbs Racing	Toyota
20	John Hunter Nemechek	Joe Gibbs Racing	Toyota
21	Austin Hill	Richard Childress Racing	Chevrolet
24	Connor Mosack (R)	Sam Hunt Racing	Toyota
25	Brett Moffitt	AM Racing	Ford
26	Kaz Grala	Sam Hunt Racing	Toyota
27	Jeb Burton	Jordan Anderson Racing	Chevrolet
28	Kyle Sieg	RSS Racing	Ford
31	Parker Retzlaff (R)	Jordan Anderson Racing	Chevrolet
35	Parker Chase	Emerling-Gase Motorsports	Toyota
38	Joe Graf Jr.	RSS Racing	Ford
39	Ryan Sieg	RSS Racing	Ford
43	Ryan Ellis	Alpha Prime Racing	Chevrolet
44	Sage Karam	Alpha Prime Racing	Chevrolet
45	Jeffrey Earnhardt	Alpha Prime Racing	Chevrolet
48	Parker Kligerman	Big Machine Racing	Chevrolet
50	Preston Pardus	Pardus Racing	Chevrolet
51	Jeremy Clements	Jeremy Clements Racing	Chevrolet
53	Brad Perez	Emerling-Gase Motorsports	Chevrolet
66	Cameron Lawrence	MBM Motorsports	Toyota
74	Baltazar Leguizamón	CHK Racing	Chevrolet
78	Anthony Alfredo	B. J. McLeod Motorsports	Chevrolet
88	Miguel Paludo	JR Motorsports	Chevrolet
91	Josh Bilicki	DGM Racing	Chevrolet
92	Alex Labbé	DGM Racing	Chevrolet
98	Riley Herbst	Stewart-Haas Racing	Ford
Official entry list

== Practice ==
The first and only practice session was held on Friday, March 24, at 5:30 PM CST, and would last for 20 minutes. A. J. Allmendinger, driving for Kaulig Racing, would set the fastest time in the session, with a lap of 2:15.055, and an average speed of 90.896 mph (146.283 km/h).

Pos.	#	Driver	Team	Make	Time	Speed
1	10	A. J. Allmendinger (i)	Kaulig Racing	Chevrolet	2:15.055	90.896
2	17	William Byron (i)	Hendrick Motorsports	Chevrolet	2:15.507	90.593
3	2	Sheldon Creed	Richard Childress Racing	Chevrolet	2:16.012	90.257
Full practice results

== Qualifying ==
Qualifying was held on Friday, March 24, at 6:00 PM CST. Since Circuit of the Americas is a road course, the qualifying system is a two group system, with two rounds. Drivers will be separated into two groups, Group A and Group B. Each driver will have multiple laps to set a time. The fastest 5 drivers from each group will advance to the final round. The fastest driver to set a time in that round will win the pole.

Under a 2021 rule change, the timing line in road course qualifying is ''not'' the start-finish line. Instead, the timing line for qualifying will be set at the exit of Istanbul 8. A. J. Allmendinger, driving for Kaulig Racing, would win the pole after advancing from the preliminary round and setting the fastest lap in Round 2, with a lap of 2:13.184, and an average speed of 92.173 mph (148.338 km/h).

Four drivers would fail to qualify: Garrett Smithley, Parker Chase, Cameron Lawrence, and Baltazar Leguizamón.

=== Full qualifying results ===
Pos.	#	Driver	Team	Make	Time (R1)	Speed (R1)	Time (R2)	Speed (R2)
1	10	A. J. Allmendinger (i)	Kaulig Racing	Chevrolet	2:12.933	92.347	2:13.184	92.173
2	18	Sammy Smith (R)	Joe Gibbs Racing	Toyota	2:14.209	91.469	2:13.686	91.827
3	19	Ty Gibbs (i)	Joe Gibbs Racing	Toyota	2:12.929	92.350	2:13.922	91.665
4	2	Sheldon Creed	Richard Childress Racing	Chevrolet	2:13.719	91.804	2:13.941	91.652
5	48	Parker Kligerman	Big Machine Racing	Chevrolet	2:14.009	91.606	2:14.612	91.195
6	20	John Hunter Nemechek	Joe Gibbs Racing	Toyota	2:14.711	91.128	2:14.871	91.020
7	98	Riley Herbst	Stewart-Haas Racing	Ford	2:14.433	91.317	2:14.933	90.978
8	7	Justin Allgaier	JR Motorsports	Chevrolet	2:14.127	91.525	2:14.986	90.943
9	17	William Byron (i) (Note: Byron's time in Round 2 was disallowed after cutting the esses in turn 4.)	Hendrick Motorsports	Chevrolet	2:13.002	92.299	—	—
10	00	Cole Custer	Stewart-Haas Racing	Ford	2:13.764	91.774	—	—
Eliminated from Round 1
11	11	Daniel Hemric	Kaulig Racing	Chevrolet	2:14.153	91.507	—	—
12	21	Austin Hill	Richard Childress Racing	Chevrolet	2:14.412	91.331	—	—
13	08	Aric Almirola (i)	SS-Green Light Racing	Ford	2:14.503	91.269	—	—
14	1	Sam Mayer	JR Motorsports	Chevrolet	2:14.750	91.102	—	—
15	8	Josh Berry	JR Motorsports	Chevrolet	2:15.098	90.867	—	—
16	44	Sage Karam	Alpha Prime Racing	Chevrolet	2:15.330	90.712	—	—
17	07	Carson Hocevar (i)	SS-Green Light Racing	Chevrolet	2:15.393	90.669	—	—
18	88	Miguel Paludo	JR Motorsports	Chevrolet	2:15.436	90.641	—	—
19	50	Preston Pardus	Pardus Racing	Chevrolet	2:15.521	90.584	—	—
20	26	Kaz Grala	Sam Hunt Racing	Toyota	2:15.613	90.522	—	—
21	27	Jeb Burton	Jordan Anderson Racing	Chevrolet	2:15.646	90.500	—	—
22	24	Connor Mosack (R)	Sam Hunt Racing	Toyota	2:15.674	90.482	—	—
23	92	Alex Labbé	DGM Racing	Chevrolet	2:15.683	90.476	—	—
24	91	Josh Bilicki	DGM Racing	Chevrolet	2:15.754	90.428	—	—
25	51	Jeremy Clements	Jeremy Clements Racing	Chevrolet	2:15.775	90.414	—	—
26	9	Brandon Jones	JR Motorsports	Chevrolet	2:15.829	90.378	—	—
27	16	Chandler Smith (R)	Kaulig Racing	Chevrolet	2:16.079	90.212	—	—
28	25	Brett Moffitt	AM Racing	Ford	2:16.709	89.797	—	—
29	78	Anthony Alfredo	B. J. McLeod Motorsports	Chevrolet	2:16.792	89.742	—	—
30	53	Brad Perez	Emerling-Gase Motorsports	Chevrolet	2:16.806	89.733	—	—
31	39	Ryan Sieg	RSS Racing	Ford	2:16.933	89.650	—	—
32	43	Ryan Ellis	Alpha Prime Racing	Chevrolet	2:17.387	89.353	—	—
33	02	Kyle Weatherman	Our Motorsports	Chevrolet	2:17.505	89.277	—	—
Qualified by owner's points
34	31	Parker Retzlaff (R)	Jordan Anderson Racing	Chevrolet	2:18.436	88.676	—	—
35	38	Joe Graf Jr.	RSS Racing	Ford	2:18.650	88.539	—	—
36	45	Jeffrey Earnhardt	Alpha Prime Racing	Chevrolet	2:19.032	88.296	—	—
37	6	Brennan Poole	JD Motorsports	Chevrolet	2:19.803	87.809	—	—
38	28	Kyle Sieg	RSS Racing	Ford	2:21.098	87.003	—	—
Failed to qualify
39	66	Cameron Lawrence	MBM Motorsports	Toyota	2:18.651	88.539	—	—
40	74	Baltazar Leguizamón	CHK Racing	Chevrolet	2:20.491	87.379	—	—
41	4	Garrett Smithley	JD Motorsports	Chevrolet	2:21.258	86.905	—	—
42	35	Parker Chase	Emerling-Gase Motorsports	Toyota	—	—	—	—
Official qualifying results
Official starting lineup

== Race results ==
Stage 1 Laps: 14

Pos.	#	Driver	Team	Make	Pts
1	10	A. J. Allmendinger (i)	Kaulig Racing	Chevrolet	0
2	2	Sheldon Creed	Richard Childress Racing	Chevrolet	9
3	48	Parker Kligerman	Big Machine Racing	Chevrolet	8
4	19	Ty Gibbs (i)	Joe Gibbs Racing	Toyota	0
5	17	William Byron (i)	Hendrick Motorsports	Chevrolet	0
6	98	Riley Herbst	Stewart-Haas Racing	Ford	5
7	7	Justin Allgaier	JR Motorsports	Chevrolet	4
8	9	Brandon Jones	JR Motorsports	Chevrolet	3
9	18	Sammy Smith (R)	Joe Gibbs Racing	Toyota	2
10	1	Sam Mayer	JR Motorsports	Chevrolet	1

Stage 2 Laps: 16

Pos.	#	Driver	Team	Make	Pts
1	2	Sheldon Creed	Richard Childress Racing	Chevrolet	10
2	39	Ryan Sieg	RSS Racing	Ford	9
3	20	John Hunter Nemechek	Joe Gibbs Racing	Toyota	8
4	08	Aric Almirola (i)	SS-Green Light Racing	Ford	0
5	8	Josh Berry	JR Motorsports	Chevrolet	6
6	10	A. J. Allmendinger (i)	Kaulig Racing	Chevrolet	0
7	17	William Byron (i)	Hendrick Motorsports	Chevrolet	0
8	19	Ty Gibbs (i)	Joe Gibbs Racing	Toyota	0
9	18	Sammy Smith (R)	Joe Gibbs Racing	Toyota	2
10	27	Jeb Burton	Jordan Anderson Racing	Chevrolet	1

Stage 3 Laps: 16

Fin	St	#	Driver	Team	Make	Laps	Led	Status	Pts
1	1	10	A. J. Allmendinger (i)	Kaulig Racing	Chevrolet	46	28	Running	0
2	9	17	William Byron (i)	Hendrick Motorsports	Chevrolet	46	1	Running	0
3	3	19	Ty Gibbs (i)	Joe Gibbs Racing	Toyota	46	0	Running	0
4	2	18	Sammy Smith (R)	Joe Gibbs Racing	Toyota	46	0	Running	37
5	8	7	Justin Allgaier	JR Motorsports	Chevrolet	46	0	Running	36
6	11	11	Daniel Hemric	Kaulig Racing	Chevrolet	46	0	Running	31
7	14	1	Sam Mayer	JR Motorsports	Chevrolet	46	0	Running	31
8	15	8	Josh Berry	JR Motorsports	Chevrolet	46	0	Running	35
9	4	2	Sheldon Creed	Richard Childress Racing	Chevrolet	46	16	Running	47
10	7	98	Riley Herbst	Stewart-Haas Racing	Ford	46	0	Running	32
11	26	9	Brandon Jones	JR Motorsports	Chevrolet	46	0	Running	29
12	27	16	Chandler Smith (R)	Kaulig Racing	Chevrolet	46	0	Running	25
13	18	88	Miguel Paludo	JR Motorsports	Chevrolet	46	0	Running	24
14	25	51	Jeremy Clements	Jeremy Clements Racing	Chevrolet	46	0	Running	23
15	23	92	Alex Labbé	DGM Racing	Chevrolet	46	0	Running	22
16	29	78	Anthony Alfredo	B. J. McLeod Motorsports	Chevrolet	46	0	Running	21
17	34	31	Parker Retzlaff (R)	Jordan Anderson Racing	Chevrolet	46	0	Running	20
18	20	26	Kaz Grala	Sam Hunt Racing	Toyota	46	0	Running	19
19	22	24	Connor Mosack (R)	Sam Hunt Racing	Toyota	46	0	Running	18
20	32	43	Ryan Ellis	Alpha Prime Racing	Chevrolet	46	0	Running	17
21	21	27	Jeb Burton	Jordan Anderson Racing	Chevrolet	46	0	Running	17
22	33	02	Kyle Weatherman	Our Motorsports	Chevrolet	46	0	Running	15
23	31	39	Ryan Sieg	RSS Racing	Ford	46	0	Running	23
24	13	08	Aric Almirola (i)	SS-Green Light Racing	Ford	46	0	Running	0
25	36	45	Jeffrey Earnhardt	Alpha Prime Racing	Chevrolet	46	0	Running	12
26	38	28	Kyle Sieg	RSS Racing	Ford	46	0	Running	11
27	6	20	John Hunter Nemechek	Joe Gibbs Racing	Toyota	46	0	Running	18
28	24	91	Josh Bilicki	DGM Racing	Chevrolet	46	0	Running	9
29	30	53	Brad Perez	Emerling-Gase Motorsports	Chevrolet	46	0	Running	8
30	35	38	Joe Graf Jr.	RSS Racing	Ford	46	0	Running	7
31	5	48	Parker Kligerman	Big Machine Racing	Chevrolet	46	1	Running	14
32	10	00	Cole Custer	Stewart-Haas Racing	Ford	45	0	Running	5
33	37	6	Brennan Poole	JD Motorsports	Chevrolet	29	0	Steering	4
34	28	25	Brett Moffitt	AM Racing	Ford	27	0	Engine	3
35	16	44	Sage Karam	Alpha Prime Racing	Chevrolet	23	0	Engine	2
36	19	50	Preston Pardus	Pardus Racing	Chevrolet	16	0	Suspension	1
37	12	21	Austin Hill	Richard Childress Racing	Chevrolet	13	0	Engine	1
38	17	07	Carson Hocevar (i)	SS-Green Light Racing	Chevrolet	7	0	Suspension	0
Official race results

== Standings after the race ==
Drivers' Championship standings

	Pos	Driver	Points
	1	Austin Hill	249
1	2	Riley Herbst	234 (-15)
1	3	John Hunter Nemechek	220 (–29)
1	4	Justin Allgaier	200 (–49)
1	5	Chandler Smith	196 (–53)
	6	Sam Mayer	187 (–62)
	7	Sammy Smith	185 (–64)
4	8	Sheldon Creed	184 (–65)
1	9	Josh Berry	183 (–66)
	10	Daniel Hemric	176 (–73)
	11	Parker Kligerman	156 (–93)
3	12	Cole Custer	152 (–97)
Official driver's standings

- Note: Only the first 12 positions are included for the driver standings.

Previous race: 2023 RAPTOR King of Tough 250	NASCAR Xfinity Series; 2023 season	Next race: 2023 ToyotaCare 250
