= 2018 F3 Americas Championship =

Motor racing competition

The 2018 F3 Americas Championship powered by Honda was the inaugural season for the all-new FIA Formula 3 regional series across North America, sanctioned by SCCA Pro Racing, the professional racing division of the Sports Car Club of America. This was the third season in total for Formula 3 racing in the United States, which was last run in 2001 with the United States Formula Three Championship.

The season began on 4 August at Pittsburgh International Race Complex and concluded on 21 October at Circuit of the Americas, after 17 races to be held at 6 meetings.

== Teams and drivers ==
Team	No.	Driver	Rounds
Abel Motorsports	8	(United States) Kyle Kirkwood	All
Abel Motorsports	51	(United States) Jacob Abel	3–6
Global Racing Group	9	(Argentina) Baltazar Leguizamón	All
Global Racing Group	24	(Denmark) Benjamin Pedersen	2, 4–6
Global Racing Group	66	(United States) Parker Locke	4–6
Importante Autosport	13	(United States) Peter Portante	1
Southern Motorsports	61	(United States) John Paul Southern, Jr.	All
Howard Motorsports	81	(United States) David Glassman	5

== Race calendar ==
All races were held on permanent road courses in the United States. The series schedule was announced on May 9, 2018.

Round		Circuit	Date	Pole position	Fastest lap	Winning driver	Winning team	Supporting
1	R1	Pittsburgh International Race Complex, Wampum	4 August	(Argentina) Baltazar Leguizamón	(United States) Kyle Kirkwood	(United States) Kyle Kirkwood	Abel Motorsports	Trans-Am Series; Atlantic Championship; Formula 4 United States Championship
1	R2	Pittsburgh International Race Complex, Wampum	5 August		(United States) Kyle Kirkwood	(United States) Kyle Kirkwood	Abel Motorsports	Trans-Am Series; Atlantic Championship; Formula 4 United States Championship
1	R3	Pittsburgh International Race Complex, Wampum	5 August		(United States) Kyle Kirkwood	(United States) Kyle Kirkwood	Abel Motorsports	Trans-Am Series; Atlantic Championship; Formula 4 United States Championship
2	R4	Mid-Ohio Sports Car Course, Lexington	August 10	(United States) Kyle Kirkwood	(United States) Kyle Kirkwood	(United States) Kyle Kirkwood	Abel Motorsports	NASCAR Xfinity Series; Trans-Am Series
2	R5	Mid-Ohio Sports Car Course, Lexington	August 10		(United States) Kyle Kirkwood	(United States) Kyle Kirkwood	Abel Motorsports	NASCAR Xfinity Series; Trans-Am Series
2	R6	Mid-Ohio Sports Car Course, Lexington	August 11		(United States) Kyle Kirkwood	(United States) Kyle Kirkwood	Abel Motorsports	NASCAR Xfinity Series; Trans-Am Series
3	R7	New Jersey Motorsports Park, Millville	September 15	(United States) Kyle Kirkwood	(United States) Kyle Kirkwood	(United States) Kyle Kirkwood	Abel Motorsports	Atlantic Championship; Formula 4 United States Championship
3	R8	New Jersey Motorsports Park, Millville	September 16		(United States) Kyle Kirkwood	(United States) Kyle Kirkwood	Abel Motorsports	Atlantic Championship; Formula 4 United States Championship
3	R9	New Jersey Motorsports Park, Millville	September 16		(United States) Kyle Kirkwood	(Argentina) Baltazar Leguizamón	Global Racing Group	Atlantic Championship; Formula 4 United States Championship
4	R10	Road Atlanta, Braselton	September 22	(United States) Kyle Kirkwood	(United States) Kyle Kirkwood	(United States) Kyle Kirkwood	Abel Motorsports	Historic Sportscar Racing
4	R11	Road Atlanta, Braselton	September 23		(United States) Kyle Kirkwood	(United States) Kyle Kirkwood	Abel Motorsports	Historic Sportscar Racing
4	R12	Road Atlanta, Braselton	September 23		(United States) Parker Locke	(United States) Kyle Kirkwood	Abel Motorsports	Historic Sportscar Racing
5	R13	NOLA Motorsports Park, Avondale	October 13	(United States) Kyle Kirkwood	(United States) Kyle Kirkwood	(Argentina) Baltazar Leguizamón	Global Racing Group	Edge Addicts
5	R14	NOLA Motorsports Park, Avondale	October 14		(United States) Kyle Kirkwood	(United States) Kyle Kirkwood	Abel Motorsports	Edge Addicts
5	R15	NOLA Motorsports Park, Avondale	October 14		(United States) Kyle Kirkwood	(United States) Kyle Kirkwood	Abel Motorsports	Edge Addicts
6	R16	Circuit of the Americas, Austin	October 20	(United States) Kyle Kirkwood	(United States) Kyle Kirkwood	(United States) Kyle Kirkwood	Abel Motorsports	Formula One; Formula 4 United States Championship
6	R17	Circuit of the Americas, Austin	October 21		(Denmark) Benjamin Pedersen	(United States) Kyle Kirkwood	Abel Motorsports	Formula One; Formula 4 United States Championship

== Championship standings ==
- Points are awarded as follows:

Position	**1st**	**2nd**	**3rd**	**4th**	**5th**	**6th**	**7th**	**8th**	**9th**	**10th**
Points	25	18	15	12	10	8	6	4	2	1

=== Drivers' standings ===
Pos	Driver	PIT (Note: Peter Portante was a non-classified finisher in Race 2, finishing 4 laps down in 3rd place. He was not awarded points.)			MOH			NJM			ROA			NOL			COTA		Pts
Pos	Driver	R1	R2	R3	R1	R2	R3	R1	R2	R3	R1	R2	R3	R1	R2	R3	R1	R2	Pts
1	(United States) Kyle Kirkwood	1	1	1	**1**	1	1	**1**	1	2	**1**	1	1	**4**	1	1	**1**	1	405
2	(Argentina) Baltazar Leguizamón	**2**	2	2	3	3	2	2	4	1	2	3	3	1	2	2	5	DNS	276
3	(Denmark) Benjamin Pedersen				2	2	3				3	2	2	2	3	4	2	2	183
4	(United States) Jacob Abel							3	3	3	5	4	4	Ret	5	3	6	4	124
5	(United States) John Paul Southern, Jr.	3	Ret	3	Ret	4	4	4	2	Ret	Ret	DNS	DNS	Ret	DNS	Ret	4	5	106
6	(United States) Parker Locke										4	5	Ret	3	4	5	3	3	89
7	(United States) Peter Portante	4	NC	Ret															12
–	(United States) David Glassman													WD	WD	WD			–
Pos	Driver	R1	R2	R3	R1	R2	R3	R1	R2	R3	R1	R2	R3	R1	R2	R3	R1	R2	Pts
Pos	Driver	PIT (Note: Peter Portante was a non-classified finisher in Race 2, finishing 4 laps down in 3rd place. He was not awarded points.)			MOH			NJM			ROA			NOL			COTA		Pts

Colour	Result
Gold	Winner
Silver	Second place
Bronze	Third place
Green	Points classification
Blue	Non-points classification
Blue	Non-classified finish (NC)
Purple	Retired, not classified (Ret)
Red	Did not qualify (DNQ)
Red	Did not pre-qualify (DNPQ)
Black	Disqualified (DSQ)
White	Did not start (DNS)
White	Withdrew (WD)
White	Race cancelled (C)
Blank	Did not practice (DNP)
Blank	Did not arrive (DNA)
Blank	Excluded (EX)

**Bold** – Pole
Italics – Fastest Lap
† — Did not finish, but classified

=== Teams Championship ===
Pos	Team	Pts
1	Abel Motorsports	529
2	Global Racing Group	459
3	Southern Motorsports	106
4	Importante Autosport	12
5	Howard Motorsports	0
