= Kyle Kirkwood =

American racing driver (born 1998)

- Kirkwood in 2026
- Nationality: (United States) American
- Born: Kyle MacLean Kirkwood; October 19, 1998 (age 28) Jupiter, Florida, United States
- Categorisation: FIA Silver (2020–2022); FIA Gold (2023–2026); FIA Platinum (2027–)

IndyCar Series career
- 86 races run over 5 years
- Team: No. 27 (Andretti Global)
- Best finish: 2nd (2026)
- First race: 2022 Firestone Grand Prix of St. Petersburg (St. Petersburg)
- Last race: 2026 Mission Grand Prix of Monterey (Laguna Seca)
- First win: 2023 Grand Prix of Long Beach (Long Beach)
- Last win: 2026 Freedom 250 Grand Prix (Washington, D.C.)
Wins	Podiums	Poles
7	12	4

Previous series
- 2021 2019 2019 2018 2018 2016-17 2015: Indy Lights; Euroformula Open Championship; Indy Pro 2000 Championship; F3 Americas Championship; U.S. F2000 National Championship; Formula 4 United States Championship; F1600 Championship Series

Championship titles
- 2021 2019 2018 2018 2017: Indy Lights Championship; Indy Pro 2000 Championship; F3 Americas Championship; U.S. F2000 National Championship; Formula 4 United States Championship

Awards
- 2016: Team USA Scholarship

Kyle MacLean Kirkwood (born October 19, 1998) is an American auto racing driver. He competes in the IndyCar Series, driving the No. 27 Dallara-Honda for Andretti Global.

Kirkwood has won some notable IndyCar Series races including the inaugural runnings of the Freedom 250 Grand Prix and the Java House Grand Prix of Arlington, as well as a two-time winner of the Acura Grand Prix of Long Beach.

== Career ==
=== Karting ===
Born in Jupiter, Florida, Kirkwood began karting at a young age, often competing alongside fellow Jupiter native Oliver Askew. Throughout his karting career, he amassed multiple titles, including the AM Engines Formula Tag Junior championship in 2012, the SKUSA SuperNationals XVII - S5 Junior championship in 2013, and back-to-back wins at the Florida Winter Tour in 2015 and 2016.

=== Lower formula ===
In 2015, Kirkwood made his single-seater debut in the F1600 Championship with Chastain Motorsports. He took victory in the season opener at Road Atlanta and contested a further six rounds to finish sixteenth.

Following his performance in Formula 4 United States, Kirkwood returned to the Formula Ford scene in 2016 to represent Team USA in the Formula Ford Festival and Walter Hayes Trophy event, finishing seventh and fourth overall in both respective events.

In 2016, Kirkwood joined the inaugural Formula 4 United States Championship with Primus Racing, which saw him claim a win at Mid-Ohio and finish third in the overall standings . In September 2016, Kirkwood was awarded with the Team USA scholarship.

After competing with them in pre-season testing at NOLA, Kirkwood returned to the championship the following year, switching to newcomers Cape Motorsports. He achieved nine victories, including back-to-back hat-tricks at Indianapolis and Motorsport Park, wrapping up the title in the Formula One supporting season finale at the Circuit of the Americas. During the season, Kirkwood was once again selected as a candidate for the Team USA scholarship.

=== International Formula 3 ===
In August 2018, Kirkwood joined Abel Motorsports to contest the inaugural season of F3 Americas. The season saw him claim fifteen of the seventeen race victories on offer and seal his third consecutive championship at NOLA with a round to spare.

The following year, Kirkwood made a one-off appearance with RP Motorsport in the season finale of the Euroformula Open Championship at Monza, which saw him take a best-placed finish of sixth in race two.

=== Formula E ===
In February 2020, Kirkwood was announced to be participating in the rookie test at Marrakesh with BMW i Andretti Motorsport.

=== Road to Indy ===
In December 2016, Kirkwood engaged in the Mazda Road to Indy Shootout, but lost out on the scholarship to Askew.

==== USF2000 ====
In 2017, Kirkwood partook in the Chris Griffis Memorial Test with Swan-RJB Motorsports. In February 2018, he reunited with Cape Motorsports to contest the 2018 championship. In his rookie season, Kirkwood dominated proceedings, taking twelve of the fourteen victories and sealed his second title in a year at Mid-Ohio which matched J. R. Hildebrand's record of wins across a season.

==== Indy Pro 2000 ====
Kirkwood graduated to the championship in 2019, selecting RP Motorsport Racing as his team. After faltering in earlier rounds, Kirkwood took his maiden victories in both races at Road America. From the second race at Toronto, Kirkwood dominated the season and won his fourth consecutive title at the season finale in Laguna Seca despite being taken out by Danial Frost.

==== Indy Lights ====
In December 2019, Kirkwood participated in the post-season test at Sebring with reigning champions Andretti Autosport. The following month, Andretti confirmed Kirkwood would race with them for the 2020 season. Unfortunately, that year's running of the championship was canceled due to the COVID-19 pandemic.

Kirkwood won the 2021 Indy Lights Championship for Andretti Autosport. In doing so, he became the first driver to win a championship by winning all three steps on the Road to Indy in the Indy series.

=== IndyCar ===
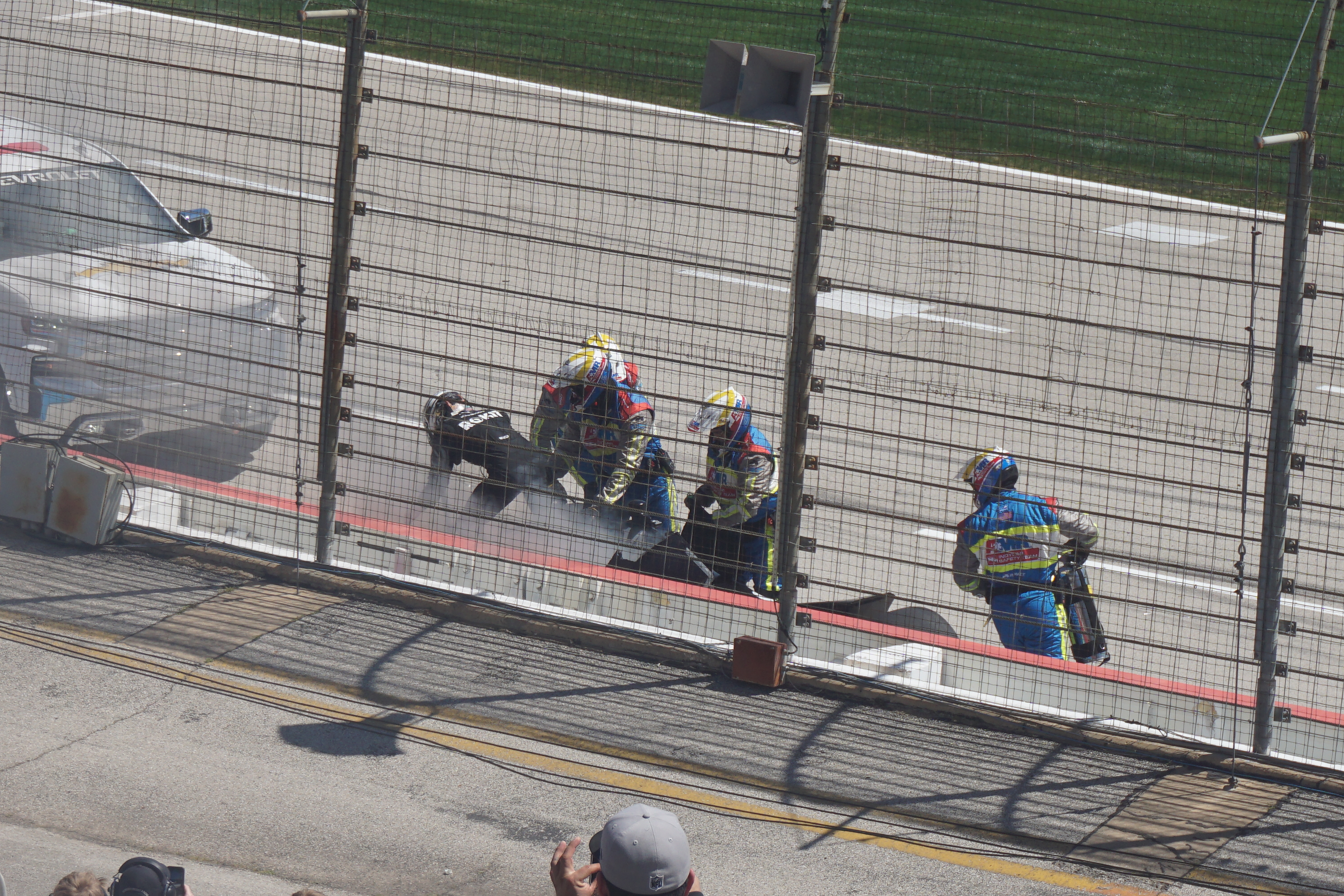
Kirkwood after crashing during the 2022 XPEL 375

Throughout 2021, Kirkwood was coveted by different teams in the IndyCar Series paddock. Andretti Autosport owner Michael Andretti stated he intended to keep Kirkwood in the Andretti Autosport stable and reiterated this after Kirkwood won the Indy Lights championship. Andretti stated that he was considering moving Kirkwood to Formula E if a seat did not open up in IndyCar.

As part of winning the Indy Lights championship, Kirkwood was guaranteed to compete in three IndyCar races in 2022, including the 2022 Indianapolis 500.

On November 10, 2021, it was announced that Kirkwood would drive the No. 14 entry, full-time, for A. J. Foyt Enterprises during the 2022 IndyCar Series season. He had a best finish of tenth at Long Beach, and ranked 24th in points.

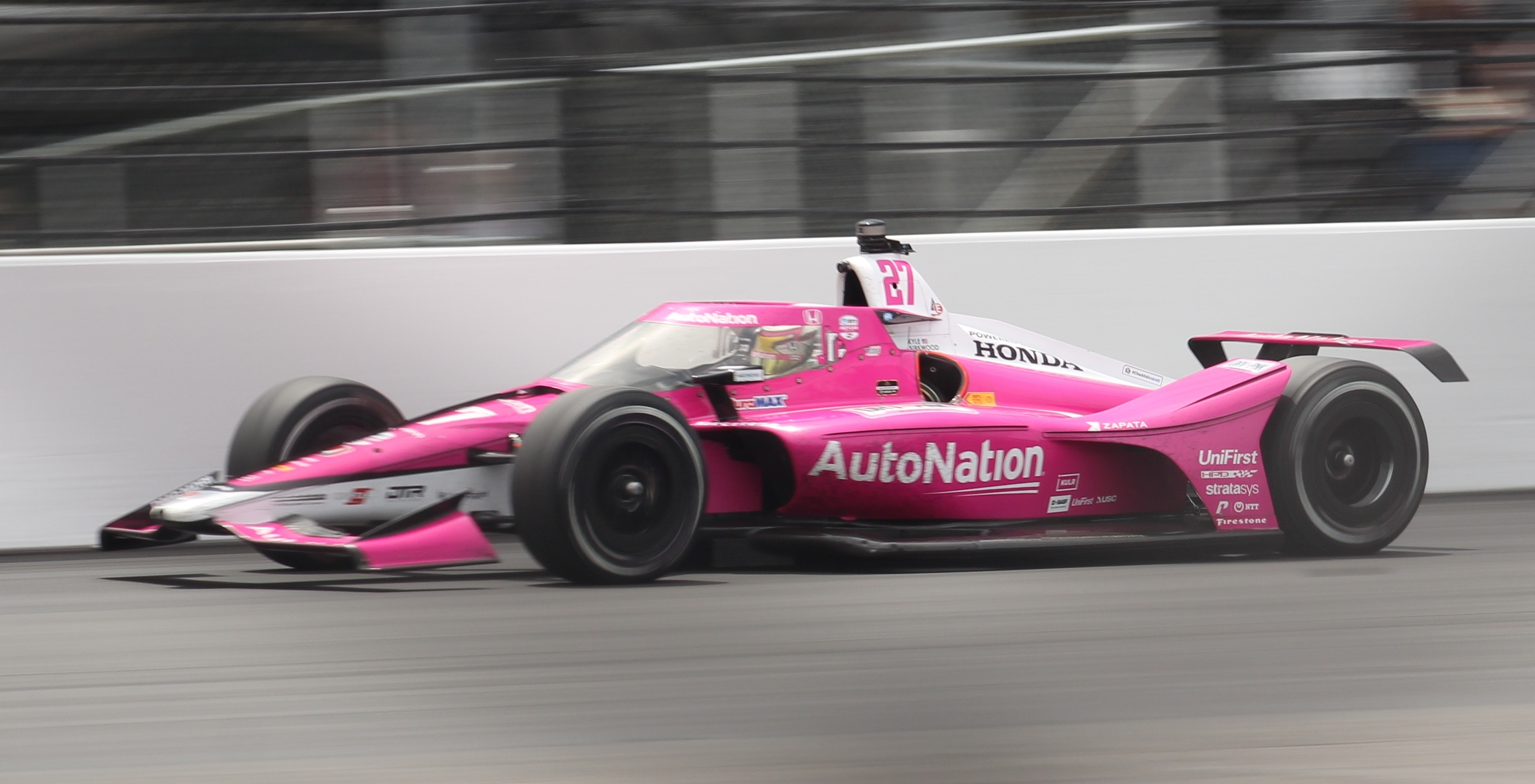
Kirkwood during the 2023 Indianapolis 500

On June 1, 2022, Kirkwood and Andretti Autosport announced he would return to the Andretti stable for the 2023 season to replace the departing Alexander Rossi. Kirkwood took his first IndyCar win at the 2023 Acura Grand Prix of Long Beach. Kirkwood took a second win at the 2023 Big Machine Music City Grand Prix.

The 2024 season saw Kirkwood's season end up without a win, but he was competitive in many races and ultimately finished seventh in the overall championship. In 2025, Kirkwood registered three wins which included races at Long Beach, Detroit, and Gateway. For his efforts, he finished fourth in the championship standings in 2025. The next year in 2026, he won the inaugural runnings of the Java House Grand Prix of Arlington and the Freedom 250 Grand Prix.

=== Sports car racing ===
With the 2020 Indy Lights season cancelled due to the COVID-19 pandemic, Kirkwood drove four races in the IMSA Prototype Challenge and also joined AIM Vasser Sullivan Racing for a limited GTD schedule.

== Karting record ==
=== Karting career summary ===
Season	Series	Team	Position
2008	Rotax Max Challenge Grand Nationals USA - Minimax		13th
2009	Rotax Max Challenge Grand Nationals USA - Minimax		6th
2009	South West Regional Cup - Mini Max		19th
2010	Florida Winter Tour - Mini Max		5th
2011	South Florida Rotax Max Challenge - Mini Max		12th
2011	WKA Manufacturer's Cup - Yamaha Jr Heavy		3rd
2012	Florida Winter Tour - Rotax Junior		5th
2012	Florida Winter Tour - TaG Junior		1st
2012	WKA Manufacturer's Cup - Yamaha Jr Heavy		3rd
2012	WKA Manufacturer's Cup - Yamaha Jr Lite		9th
2012	Rotax Max Challenge Pan American Championship - Junior		4th
2013	Florida Winter Tour - Rotax Junior		3rd
2013	SKUSA SuperNationals XVII - S5 Junior	Ocala Grand Prix	1st
2013	Rotax Max Challenge Grand Finals - Junior Max	Maxspeed Group	12th
2014	Florida Winter Tour - Rotax Senior	OGP	2nd
2014	Florida Winter Tour - Stock Moto		8th
2014	SKUSA SuperNationals XVIII - S2	Ocala Grand Prix	
2014	SKUSA Pro Tour - S2		3rd
2015	Florida Winter Tour - Rotax Senior		1st
2015	Florida Winter Tour - Senior ROK		1st
2015	Florida Winter Tour - Shifter ROK		9th
2015	ROK Cup International Final - Super ROK		11th
2015	Rotax Max Challenge Grand Finals - Senior Max	Maxspeed Group	4th
2016	Florida Winter Tour - Shifter ROK		1st
2016	Florida Winter Tour - Senior ROK		1st
2016	SKUSA Pro Tour - S1		25th
2016	SKUSA SuperNationals XX - X30 Senior	PSL Karting	38th
2016	SKUSA SuperNationals XX - S1 Pro Stock		22nd

== Racing record ==
=== Racing career summary ===
Season	Series	Team	Races	Wins	Poles	F/Laps	Podiums	Points	Position
2015	F1600 Championship Series	Chastain Motorsports	7	1	0	1	2	181	16th
2016	Formula 4 United States Championship	Primus Racing	15	1	1	1	9	183	**3rd**
2016	Formula Ford Festival	Cliff Dempsey Racing	1	0	0	0	0	N/A	7th
2016	Walter Hayes Trophy - Heats/Semis	Cliff Dempsey Racing	4	1	0	1	2	0	NC
2016	Walter Hayes Trophy	Cliff Dempsey Racing	1	0	0	0	0	0	4th
2017	Formula 4 United States Championship	Cape Motorsports	20	9	6	10	15	345	**1st**
2018	F3 Americas Championship	Abel Motorsports	17	15	5	15	16	405	**1st**
2018	U.S. F2000 National Championship	Cape Motorsports	14	12	5	6	13	374	**1st**
2019	Indy Pro 2000 Championship	RP Motorsport Racing	16	9	5	7	11	419	**1st**
2019	Euroformula Open Championship	RP Motorsport Racing	2	0	0	0	0	0	NC†
2020	IMSA SportsCar Championship - GTD	AIM Vasser Sullivan	2	0	0	0	0	42	37th
2020	IMSA Prototype Challenge	Forty7 Motorsports	4	1	0	4	2	109	16th
2021	Indy Lights	Andretti Autosport	20	10	7	9	14	537	**1st**
2021	IMSA SportsCar Championship - GTD	Vasser Sullivan Racing	5	0	1	0	0	898	29th
2022	IndyCar Series	A. J. Foyt Enterprises	17	0	0	0	0	183	24th
2022	IMSA SportsCar Championship - GTD Pro	Vasser Sullivan Racing	3	1	1	0	1	999	9th
2022	IMSA SportsCar Championship - GTD	Vasser Sullivan Racing	1	1	1	0	1	385	45th
2023	IndyCar Series	Andretti Autosport	17	2	1	1	2	352	11th
2023	IMSA SportsCar Championship - GTD Pro	Vasser Sullivan Racing	2	0	1	0	1	617	13th
2023	IMSA SportsCar Championship - GTD	Vasser Sullivan Racing	1	0	0	0	0	284	50th
2024	IndyCar Series	Andretti Global	17	0	1	0	1	420	7th
2024	IMSA SportsCar Championship - GTD Pro	Vasser Sullivan	3	1	1	0	1	817	19th
2025	IndyCar Series	Andretti Global	17	3	1	0	3	433	4th
2025	IMSA SportsCar Championship - GTD Pro	Vasser Sullivan Racing	3	0	0	0	0	722	19th
2025	IMSA SportsCar Championship - GTD	Vasser Sullivan Racing	1	0	0	0	0	188	77th
2026	IndyCar Series	Andretti Global	18	2	1	1	6	545	**2nd**
2026	IMSA SportsCar Championship - GTD Pro	Vasser Sullivan Racing	3	0	1	0	0	694	23rd

^{†} As Kirkwood was a guest driver, he was ineligible to score points. ^{*} Season still in progress.

=== Complete Formula 4 United States Championship results ===
(key) (Races in bold indicate pole position) (Races in italics indicate fastest lap)

Year	Entrant	1	2	3	4	5	6	7	8	9	10	11	12	13	14	15	16	17	18	19	20	DC	Points
2016	Primus Racing	**MOH1**; **1**; 2	MOH1; 2; 2	MOH1; 3; 2	MOH2; 1; 1	MOH2; 2 Ret	MOH2; 3; 2	NJMP; 1; 2	NJMP; 2; 11	NJMP; 3 Ret	ATL; 1; 2	ATL; 2; 3	ATL; 3; 3	HMS; 1; 5	HMS; 2; 9	HMS; 3; 6						3rd	183
2017	Cape Motorsports	HMS; 1 Ret	HMS; 2; 8	HMS; 3; 10	**IMS**; **1**; 1	IMS; 2; 1	IMS; 3; 1	MSP; 1; 1	MSP; 2; 1	MSP; 3; 1	**MOH**; **1**; 7	MOH; 2; 2	MOH; 3; 1	**VIR**; **1**; 8	VIR; 2; 2	VIR; 3; 1	COTA1; 1; 2	COTA1; 2; 3	COTA1; 3; 2	**COTA2**; **1**; 2	COTA2; 2; 1	1st	345

=== American open–wheel racing results ===
==== U.S. F2000 Championship ====
Year	Team	1	2	3	4	5	6	7	8	9	10	11	12	13	14	Rank	Points
2018	Cape Motorsports	STP; 1	STP; 5	**IMS**; 2	**IMS**; 1	**LOR**; 1	ROA; 1	ROA; 1	TOR; 1	TOR; 1	**MOH**; 1	MOH; 1	MOH; 1	**POR**; 1	POR; 1	1st	440

==== Indy Pro 2000 Championship ====
Year	Team	1	2	3	4	5	6	7	8	9	10	11	12	13	14	15	16	Rank	Points
2019	RP Motorsport Racing	STP; 14	STP; 2	IMS; 2	IMS; 13	LOR; 4	ROA; 1	ROA; 1	**TOR**; 8	**TOR**; 1	**MOH**; 1	**MOH**; 1	GTW; 1	POR; 1	**POR**; 1	LAG; 1	LAG; 14	1st	419

==== Indy Lights ====
Year	Team	1	2	3	4	5	6	7	8	9	10	11	12	13	14	15	16	17	18	19	20	Rank	Points
2021	Andretti Autosport	ALA; 9	ALA; 5	**STP**; 1	STP; 2	IMS; 4	IMS; 4	**DET**; 1	DET; 1	RDA; 1	RDA; 12	**MOH**; 1	MOH; 1	GTW; 2	**GTW**; 2	POR; 2	POR; 1	**LAG**; 1	**LAG**; 1	**MOH**; 1	MOH; 5	1st	537

==== IndyCar Series ====
(key) (Races in bold indicate pole position; races in italics indicate fastest lap)

Year	Team	No.	Chassis	Engine	1	2	3	4	5	6	7	8	9	10	11	12	13	14	15	16	17	18	Rank	Points	Ref
2022	A. J. Foyt Enterprises	14	Dallara DW12	Chevrolet	STP; 18	TXS; 25	LBH; 10	ALA; 22	IMS; 26	INDY; 17	DET; 24	ROA; 20	MOH; 26	TOR; 22	IOW; 15	IOW; 25	IMS; 23	NSH; 19	GTW; 17	POR; 13	LAG; 21		24th	183	
2023	Andretti Autosport	27	Dallara DW12	Honda	STP; 15	TXS; 27	**LBH**; 1*	ALA; 12	IMS; 14	INDY; 28	DET; 6	ROA; 9	MOH; 17	TOR; 15	IOW; 7	IOW; 11	NSH; 1*	IMS; 9	GTW; 15	POR; 10	LAG; 25		11th	352	
2024	Andretti Global	27	Dallara DW12	Honda	STP; 10	THE; DNQ	LBH; 7	ALA; 10	IMS; 11	INDY; 7	DET; 4	ROA; 5	LAG; 5	MOH; 8	IOW; 7	IOW; 16	TOR; 2	GTW; 22	POR; 10	MIL; 12	MIL; 8	**NSH**; 4*	7th	420	
2025	Andretti Global	27	Dallara DW12	Honda	STP; 5	THE; 8	**LBH**; 1*	ALA; 11	IMS; 8	INDY; 32	DET; 1*	GTW; 1	ROA; 4	MOH; 8	IOW; 26	IOW; 18	TOR; 6	LAG; 16	POR; 20	MIL; 12	NSH; 6		4th	433	
2026	Andretti Global	27	Dallara DW12	Honda	STP; 4	PHX; 2	ARL; 1*	ALA; 5	LBH; 4	IMS; 9	INDY; 16	DET; 2	GTW; 6	ROA; 10	MOH; 3	**NSH**; 10	POR; 5	MRK; 21	WSH; 1*	MIL; 15	MIL; 6	LAG; 2	2nd	545	

==== Indianapolis 500 ====
Year	Chassis	Engine	Start	Finish	Team
2022	Dallara	Chevrolet	28	17	A. J. Foyt Enterprises
2023	Dallara	Honda	15	28	Andretti Autosport
2024	Dallara	Honda	11	7	Andretti Global
2025	Dallara	Honda	23	32	Andretti Global
2026	Dallara	Honda	25	16	Andretti Global

=== Complete IMSA SportsCar Championship results ===
(key) (Races in bold indicate pole position; races in italics indicate fastest lap)

Year	Entrant	Class	Make	Engine	1	2	3	4	5	6	7	8	9	10	11	12	Rank	Points
2020	AIM Vasser Sullivan	GTD	Lexus RC F GT3	Lexus 5.0 L V8	DAY	DAY	SEB	ELK	VIR	ATL	MOH	CLT	PET; 8	LGA	SEB; 12		37th	42
2021	Vasser Sullivan Racing	GTD	Lexus RC F GT3	Lexus 5.0 L V8	DAY; 16	SEB; 7	MOH	DET	**WGL**; 6	WGL	LIM	ELK	LGA	LBH	VIR	PET; 15	29th	898
2022	Vasser Sullivan Racing	GTD Pro	Lexus RC F GT3	Toyota 2UR-GSE 5.0 L V8	DAY; 4	SEB	LBH	LGA			WGL; 4	MOS	LIM	ELK	VIR	**PET**; 1	9th	999
2022	Vasser Sullivan Racing	GTD	Lexus RC F GT3	Toyota 2UR-GSE 5.0 L V8					MOH	**DET**; 1							45th	385
2023	Vasser Sullivan Racing	GTD	Lexus RC F GT3	Toyota 2UR-GSE 5.0 L V8	DAY; 5												50th	284
2023	Vasser Sullivan Racing	GTD Pro	Lexus RC F GT3	Toyota 2UR-GSE 5.0 L V8		SEB; 2	LBH	LGA	WGL	MOS	LIM	ELK	VIR	IMS	**PET**; 8		13th	617
2024	VasserSullivan	GTD Pro	Lexus RC F GT3	Toyota 2UR-GSE 5.0 L V8	DAY; 11	**SEB**; 1	LGA	DET	WGL	MOS	ELK	VIR	IMS	PET; 13			19th	817
2025	Vasser Sullivan Racing	GTD Pro	Lexus RC F GT3	Toyota 2UR-GSE 5.0 L V8	DAY; 11	SEB; 11		LGA	DET	WGL	MOS	ELK	VIR	IMS	PET; 6		19th	722
2025	Vasser Sullivan Racing	GTD	Lexus RC F GT3	Toyota 2UR-GSE 5.0 L V8	DAY; 14		LBH										77th	188
2026	Vasser Sullivan Racing	GTD Pro	Lexus RC F GT3	Toyota 2UR-GSE 5.4 L V8	DAY; 10	**SEB**; 11	LGA	DET	WGL	MOS	ELK	VIR	IMS	PET; 10			23rd	694

Sporting positions
Preceded by Cameron Das	Formula 4 United States Championship; Champion; 2017	Succeeded by Dakota Dickerson
Preceded by Oliver Askew	U.S. F2000 National Championship; Champion; 2018	Succeeded by Braden Eves
Preceded by Inaugural	F3 Americas Championship; Champion; 2018	Succeeded by Dakota Dickerson
Preceded by Rinus VeeKay (Pro Mazda Championship)	Indy Pro 2000 Championship; Champion; 2019	Succeeded by Sting Ray Robb
Preceded by Oliver Askew (2019)	Indy Lights; Champion; 2021	Succeeded by Linus Lundqvist
