= 2017 Formula 4 United States Championship =

Motor racing competition

The 2017 Formula 4 United States Championship season was the second season of the United States Formula 4 Championship, a motor racing series regulated according to FIA Formula 4 regulations and sanctioned by SCCA Pro Racing, the professional racing division of the Sports Car Club of America. It began on 8 April at Homestead-Miami Speedway and finished on 22 October at the Circuit of the Americas, after seven triple header rounds.

== Teams and drivers ==
All teams were American-registered.

Team	No.	Driver	Rounds
Group A Racing	1	(United States) Konrad Czaczyk	1
Group A Racing	29	(United States) Jonathan Scarallo	All
Group A Racing	30	(United States) Flinn Lazier	2
Group A Racing	30	(United States) Russ McDonough IV	6–7
Momentum Motorsports	2	(United States) Skylar Robinson	All
Momentum Motorsports	16	(United States) Kent Vaccaro	All
Indy Motorsport Group	3	(United States) Vincent Khristov	1–6
Indy Motorsport Group	10	(United States) Davis Durrett	1–6
Indy Motorsport Group	10	(United States) Chandler Horton	7
Indy Motorsport Group	35	(United States) Chris Archinaco	1–5
Indy Motorsport Group	35	(United States) Nick Andries	6
Indy Motorsport Group	62	(Canada) Raphael Forcier	All
Primus Racing Team	4	(United States) James Goughary Jr	All
Primus Racing Team	5	(United States) Austin McCusker	All
Jay Howard's Motorsports Driver Development	6	(United States) Parker Locke	All
Jay Howard's Motorsports Driver Development	11	(United States) Colin Mullan	4
Jay Howard's Motorsports Driver Development	11	(United States) Tyler O'Connor	5
Jay Howard's Motorsports Driver Development	14	(United States) Max Peichel	1–4
Jay Howard's Motorsports Driver Development	14	(United States) Elliot Finlayson	5
Jay Howard's Motorsports Driver Development	14	(United States) Dalton Peak	6–7
Jay Howard's Motorsports Driver Development	26	(United States) Sam Paley	1, 3, 7
Jay Howard's Motorsports Driver Development	41	(United States) Braden Eves	2, 6–7
Jay Howard's Motorsports Driver Development	61	(United States) John Paul Southern Jr	All
Cape Motorsports	07	(Canada) Steve Bamford	All
Cape Motorsports	8	(United States) Kyle Kirkwood	All
Cape Motorsports	9	(Colombia) Mathias Soler	All
Cape Motorsports	51	(United States) Jett Noland	1
JDX Racing	7	(United States) Blake Mount	All
JDX Racing	19	(United States) Timo Reger	1–6
JDX Racing	28	(United States) Ben Waddell	All
DEForce Racing	12	(Mexico) Moisés de la Vara	5–6
DEForce Racing	77	(United States) Kory Enders	5–7
HellHound Motorsports; Abel Motorsports	21	(United States) John Andrew Entwistle	1–2, 7
HellHound Motorsports; Abel Motorsports	22	(United States) Jacob Abel	All
Global Racing Group	24	(Denmark) Benjamin Pedersen	All
Global Racing Group	N/A	(France) Pierre Thiriet	6
Global Racing Group	25	(Denmark) Frederik Vesti	7
Global Racing Group	39	(Jamaica) Justin Sirgany	All
Global Racing Group	68	(United States) Jacob Loomis	1–6
Austin Kaszuba Racing	27	(United States) Austin Kaszuba	1–2
Crosslink Racing	27	(United States) Austin Kaszuba	4–7
Crosslink Racing	37	(South Africa) Jordan Sherratt	All
Miller Vinatieri Leguizamón Motorsports	40	(United States) Jack William Miller	1, 3–7
Miller Vinatieri Leguizamón Motorsports	45	(Argentina) Baltazar Leguizamón	All
Miller Vinatieri Leguizamón Motorsports	65	(United States) Alan Miller	1–2
Miller Vinatieri Leguizamón Motorsports	65	(United States) Chandler Horton	4
Miller Vinatieri Leguizamón Motorsports	96	(United States) Lawson Nagel	All
Kiwi Motorsport LTD	85	(United States) Dakota Dickerson	3, 5–7
Kiwi Motorsport LTD	86	(New Zealand) Brendon Leitch	All
C.G. Racing	97	(United States) Christopher Gumprecht	2, 4–5

== Race calendar ==
Round		Circuit	Date	Pole position	Fastest lap	Winning driver	Winning team	Supporting
1	R1	(United States) Homestead-Miami Speedway (Homestead, Florida)	8 April	(Denmark) Benjamin Pedersen	(Canada) Raphael Forcier	(United States) Timo Reger	JDX Racing	Trans-Am Series
1	R2	(United States) Homestead-Miami Speedway (Homestead, Florida)	9 April		(United States) Kyle Kirkwood	(Canada) Raphael Forcier	Indy Motorsport Group	Trans-Am Series
1	R3	(United States) Homestead-Miami Speedway (Homestead, Florida)	9 April		(United States) Sam Paley	(United States) Timo Reger	JDX Racing	Trans-Am Series
2	R1	(United States) Indianapolis Motor Speedway (Speedway, Indiana)	10 June	(United States) Kyle Kirkwood	(United States) Timo Reger	(United States) Kyle Kirkwood	Cape Motorsports	Sportscar Vintage Racing Association; Atlantic Championship
2	R2	(United States) Indianapolis Motor Speedway (Speedway, Indiana)	11 June		(United States) Kyle Kirkwood	(United States) Kyle Kirkwood	Cape Motorsports	Sportscar Vintage Racing Association; Atlantic Championship
2	R3	(United States) Indianapolis Motor Speedway (Speedway, Indiana)	11 June		(United States) Kyle Kirkwood	(United States) Kyle Kirkwood	Cape Motorsports	Sportscar Vintage Racing Association; Atlantic Championship
3	R1	(Canada) Canadian Tire Motorsport Park (Bowmanville, Ontario)	8 July	(United States) Dakota Dickerson	(United States) Kyle Kirkwood	(United States) Kyle Kirkwood	Cape Motorsports	Weathertech Sportscar Championship
3	R2	(Canada) Canadian Tire Motorsport Park (Bowmanville, Ontario)	9 July		(United States) Kyle Kirkwood	(United States) Kyle Kirkwood	Cape Motorsports	Weathertech Sportscar Championship
3	R3	(Canada) Canadian Tire Motorsport Park (Bowmanville, Ontario)	9 July		(United States) Kyle Kirkwood	(United States) Kyle Kirkwood	Cape Motorsports	Weathertech Sportscar Championship
4	R1	(United States) Mid-Ohio Sports Car Course (Lexington, Ohio)	11 August	(United States) Kyle Kirkwood	(New Zealand) Brendon Leitch	(New Zealand) Brendon Leitch	Kiwi Motorsport	Trans-Am Series; NASCAR Xfinity Series
4	R2	(United States) Mid-Ohio Sports Car Course (Lexington, Ohio)	11 August		(United States) Kyle Kirkwood	(United States) Skylar Robinson	Momentum Motorsports	Trans-Am Series; NASCAR Xfinity Series
4	R3	(United States) Mid-Ohio Sports Car Course (Lexington, Ohio)	12 August		(United States) Kyle Kirkwood	(United States) Kyle Kirkwood	Cape Motorsports	Trans-Am Series; NASCAR Xfinity Series
5	R1	(United States) Virginia International Raceway (Alton, Virginia)	26 August	(United States) Kyle Kirkwood	(United States) Kyle Kirkwood	(Argentina) Baltazar Leguizamón	Miller Vinatieri Leguizamón Motorsports	Weathertech Sportscar Championship
5	R2	(United States) Virginia International Raceway (Alton, Virginia)	26 August		(United States) Tyler O'Connor	(South Africa) Jordan Sherratt	Crosslink Racing	Weathertech Sportscar Championship
5	R3	(United States) Virginia International Raceway (Alton, Virginia)	27 August		(United States) Kyle Kirkwood	(United States) Kyle Kirkwood	Cape Motorsports	Weathertech Sportscar Championship
6	R1	(United States) Circuit of the Americas (Austin, Texas)	15 September	(Denmark) Benjamin Pedersen	(Denmark) Benjamin Pedersen	(Denmark) Benjamin Pedersen	Global Racing Group	FIA World Endurance Championship
6	R2	(United States) Circuit of the Americas (Austin, Texas)	15 September		(United States) Dakota Dickerson	(Denmark) Benjamin Pedersen	Global Racing Group	FIA World Endurance Championship
6	R3	(United States) Circuit of the Americas (Austin, Texas)	16 September		(United States) Braden Eves	(United States) Braden Eves	Jay Howard's Motorsports Driver Development	FIA World Endurance Championship
7	R1	(United States) Circuit of the Americas (Austin, Texas)	21 October	(United States) Kyle Kirkwood	(Denmark) Benjamin Pedersen	(Denmark) Benjamin Pedersen	Global Racing Group	Formula One
7	R2	(United States) Circuit of the Americas (Austin, Texas)	22 October		(United States) Austin Kaszuba	(United States) Kyle Kirkwood	Cape Motorsports	Formula One

== Championship standings ==
Points were awarded to the top 10 classified finishers in each race.

Position	**1st**	**2nd**	**3rd**	**4th**	**5th**	**6th**	**7th**	**8th**	**9th**	**10th**
Points	25	18	15	12	10	8	6	4	2	1

=== Drivers' standings ===
Pos	Driver	HMS			IMS			MSP			MOH			VIR			COTA1			COTA2		Points
1	(United States) Kyle Kirkwood	Ret	8	10	**1**	1	1	1	1	1	**7**	2	1	**8**	2	1	2	3	2	**2**	1	345
2	(Canada) Raphael Forcier	9	1	3	4	5	5	2	15	16	3	4	5	7	3	5	11	11	Ret	9	28	162
3	(United States) Dakota Dickerson							**4**	2	2				3	4	4	4	6	4	3	2	152
4	(Denmark) Benjamin Pedersen	**2**	11	Ret	18	15	3	25	16	14	16	8	10	5	9	7	**1**	1	3	1	10	147
5	(South Africa) Jordan Sherratt	7	DNS	15	13	20	7	7	5	4	2	27	7	2	1	3	7	28	14	8	11	132
6	(United States) Braden Eves				2	3	4										3	2	1	4	3	130
7	(United States) Timo Reger	1	2	1	23	2	6	5	4	6	14	14	15	14	21	20	19	Ret	13			124
8	(New Zealand) Brendon Leitch	12	12	12	12	26	14	6	6	15	1	3	2	4	8	Ret	16	9	11	5	4	113
9	(Argentina) Baltazar Leguizamón	6	Ret	Ret	8	7	11	9	13	3	19	11	Ret	1	5	8	Ret	8	5	7	5	104
10	(United States) Skylar Robinson	26	17	11	9	11	28	Ret	21	18	6	1	4	6	6	2	5	29	7	14	8	101
11	(United States) Jacob Loomis	3	6	DNS	20	4	2	3	3	7	10	16	Ret	23	Ret	18	10	14	26			91
12	(Colombia) Mathias Soler	10	4	5	6	13	10	10	7	5	Ret	21	6	9	13	10	6	7	6	25	7	88
13	(United States) Ben Waddell	15	3	9	3	Ret	9	15	12	26	4	12	11	13	16	14	8	5	Ret	19	6	68
14	(United States) James Goughary Jr	4	5	8	15	Ret	15	17	25	23	17	5	8	Ret	22	16	27	22	Ret	Ret	20	40
15	(United States) Austin Kaszuba	8	7	2	25	8	12				21	26	Ret	11	10	Ret	14	13	18	11	26	33
16	(Jamaica) Justin Sirgany	DNS	15	19	7	23	13	12	Ret	DNS	15	6	3	25	18	11	12	Ret	DNS	17	15	29
17	(United States) Kory Enders													19	11	15	15	4	8	6	14	28
18	(United States) Jack William Miller	5	Ret	6				11	10	9	Ret	20	14	30	17	12	EX	18	19	27	9	23
19	(United States) John Paul Southern Jr	DNS	21	22	19	15	Ret	13	8	8	11	24	Ret	10	7	9	13	10	9	13	18	20
20	(United States) Jonathan Scarallo	11	9	4	DSQ	9	25	Ret	18	17	Ret	18	9	17	12	Ret	18	16	Ret	20	31	18
21	(United States) Flinn Lazier				5	6	Ret															18
22	(United States) Colin Mullan										5	7	13									16
23	(United States) Austin McCusker	22	20	16	17	12	20	8	9	13	8	13	NC	28	Ret	19	9	20	17	15	27	12
24	(United States) Jacob Abel	24	Ret	DNS	10	25	8	14	17	12	9	10	12	15	14	13	20	15	10	12	29	9
25	(United States) Tyler O'Connor													24	29	6						8
26	(United States) Sam Paley	13	10	7				19	14	10										16	13	8
27	(United States) Davis Durrett	18	19	13	24	19	16	18	20	19	22	9	17	DNS	20	23	DNS	23	22			2
28	(United States) Max Peichel	Ret	13	20	11	10	23	16	11	11	Ret	DNS	DNS									1
29	(Denmark) Frederik Vesti																			10	12	1
30	(United States) Blake Mount	17	Ret	Ret	Ret	16	21	22	Ret	24	12	25	18	21	23	25	17	12	25	29	24	0
31	(Mexico) Moisés de la Vara													29	15	Ret	29	30	12			0
32	(United States) Elliot Finlayson													12	24	17						0
33	(Canada) Steve Bamford	16	16	18	Ret	21	22	23	22	22	13	17	21	18	19	22	25	21	24	23	23	0
34	(United States) Lawson Nagel	Ret	24	14	16	18	17	20	19	25	24	Ret	19	16	25	26	24	24	21	18	21	0
35	(United States) John Andrew Entwistle	25	14	17	Ret	DNS	DNS													28	25	0
36	(United States) Chris Archinaco	Ret	Ret	21	14	22	18	21	23	Ret	Ret	Ret	20	DNS	DNS	DNS						0
37	(United States) Jett Noland	14	22	Ret																		0
38	(United States) Dalton Peak																28	19	15	21	18	0
39	(United States) Chandler Horton										Ret	15	Ret							22	30	0
40	(United States) Kent Vaccaro	19	23	DNS	21	28	27	Ret	Ret	Ret	18	22	16	22	30	Ret	22	EX	20	24	17	0
41	(United States) Parker Locke	20	Ret	DNS	26	24	26	24	24	21	23	19	24	20	26	21	21	25	16	26	19	0
42	(United States) Vincent Khristov	23	18	Ret	27	17	19	Ret	Ret	20	20	23	22	26	27	24	23	17	Ret			0
43	(United States) Alan Miller	21	Ret	Ret	22	27	24															0
44	(United States) Russ McDonough IV																26	26	Ret	Ret	22	0
45	(United States) Christopher Gumprecht				DNS	DNS	DNS				DNS	DNS	23	27	28	27						0
46	(United States) Nick Andries																Ret	27	23			0
–	(United States) Konrad Czaczyk	DNS	DNS	DNS																		–
–	(France) Pierre Thiriet																WD	WD	WD			–
Pos	Driver	HMS			IMS			MSP			MOH			VIR			COTA1			COTA2		Points

Colour	Result
Gold	Winner
Silver	Second place
Bronze	Third place
Green	Points classification
Blue	Non-points classification
Blue	Non-classified finish (NC)
Purple	Retired, not classified (Ret)
Red	Did not qualify (DNQ)
Red	Did not pre-qualify (DNPQ)
Black	Disqualified (DSQ)
White	Did not start (DNS)
White	Withdrew (WD)
White	Race cancelled (C)
Blank	Did not practice (DNP)
Blank	Did not arrive (DNA)
Blank	Excluded (EX)

**Bold** – Pole
Italics – Fastest Lap

=== Teams' championship ===
Pos	Team	Points
1	Cape Motorsports	433
2	Global Racing Group	268
3	Kiwi Motorsport	266
4	JDX Racing	192
5	Jay Howard's Motorsports Driver Development	183
6	Indy Motorsport Group	164
7	Crosslink Racing	164
8	Miller Vinatieri Leguizamón Motorsports	127
9	Momentum Motorsports	101
10	Primus Racing Team	52
11	Group A Racing	36
12	Austin Kaszuba Racing	32
13	DEForce Racing	24
14	Abel Motorsports	9
15	C.G. Racing	0
