= Baltazar Leguizamón =

Argentine racing driver (born 2000)

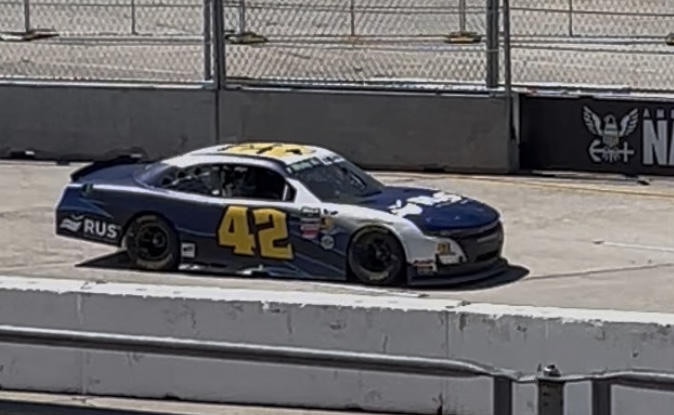
- Leguizamón's No. 42 car at the Coronado Street Course in 2026
- Nationality: (Argentina) Argentine
- Born: 11 August 2000 (age 26) Arrecifes, Argentina

NASCAR O'Reilly Auto Parts Series career
- 4 races run over 2 years
- 2026 position: 53rd
- Best finish: 53rd (2026)
- First race: 2025 Focused Health 250 (Austin)
- Last race: 2026 National Debt Relief 250 (Martinsville)
Wins	Top tens	Poles
0	0	0
- Statistics up to date as of 7 November 2026.

Baltazar Leguizamón (born 11 August 2000) is an Argentine professional racing driver. He last competed part-time in the NASCAR O'Reilly Auto Parts Series, driving the No. 30 Chevrolet Camaro SS for Barrett-Cope Racing, and the No. 42 Chevrolet Camaro SS for Young's Motorsports.

== Racing career ==
=== Early career ===
Leguizamón began his racing career in karting before progressing to single-seater categories in South America. Between 2015 and 2018, he competed in Formula 4 Sudamericana, Formula 4 United States Championship, NACAM Formula 4 Championship, Atlantic Championship and F3 Americas Championship, achieving multiple wins and podiums, including a championship title in the 2018 Atlantic Championship with K-Hill Motorsports.

=== Argentina ===
From 2019 onwards, Leguizamón competed in the Top Race V6 and TC Mouras series, driving for his own team DM Team.

=== NASCAR ===
On 21 March 2023, it was announced that Leguizamon would attempt to make his NASCAR Xfinity Series debut for CHK Racing for the race at COTA. He was originally scheduled to drive for MBM Motorsports for that race, but that would not happen due to sponsorship issues. He would ultimately fail to qualify.

In 2025, Leguizamón debuted in the NASCAR Xfinity Series at the Circuit of the Americas in Austin, Texas. The event marked his first appearance in one of NASCAR’s three national divisions, making him the first Argentine driver of his generation to reach that level. He finished in 37th due to mechanical issues.

On 5 January 2026, it was announced that Leguizamón will run a partial schedule in the now renamed NASCAR O'Reilly Auto Parts Series, driving the No. 30 Chevrolet for Barrett-Cope Racing. He ran San Diego at the Coronado Street Course with Young's Motorsports in their No. 42.

== Personal life ==
He is the son of Alejandro Leguizamón, businessman and former racing driver.

== Racing record ==
=== Career summary ===
Season	Series	Team	Races	Wins	Poles	F/Laps	Podiums	Points	Position
2015	Formula 4 Sudamericana	N/A	9	0	0	0	4	125	6th
2016	Formula 4 Sudamericana	N/A	6	1	0	0	3	72	10th
2016	Formula 4 United States Championship	Momentum Motorsport	8	0	0	0	0	72	6th
2016	Formula 4 United States Championship	MVM Motorsports	6	0	0	0	2	72	6th
2016	Formula Renault 2.0 Argentina	Werner Competición	4	0	0	0	0	13	29th
2016–17	NACAM Formula 4 Championship	MomoF4 Team	0	0	0	0	0	0	NC
2017	Formula 4 United States Championship	Miller Vinatieri Leguizamón Motorsports	20	1	0	0	2	104	9th
2018	F3 Americas Championship	Global Racing Group	16	2	3	0	14	276	**2nd**
2018	Top Race Series	DM Team	1	0	0	0	0	10	17th
2018	Atlantic Championship	K-Hill Motorsports	13	10	7	4	13	600	**1st**
2019	F3 Americas Championship	Global Racing Group	8	0	0	0	5	100	7th
2019	Top Race Series	InBest Racing	6	0	0	0	0	28	17th
2020	Top Race Series	DM Team	12	1	1	0	6	90	5th
2021	Top Race V6	Pfening Competición	20	0	0	0	3	66	11th
2021	TC Mouras	DM Team by Galarza	6	0	0	0	0	124	28th
2022	TC2000 Championship	FS Motorsport	1	0	0	0	0	0	23rd
2022	Top Race V6	DM Team	6	0	0	0	1	13	18th
2023	TC Mouras	DM Team	15	0	0	0	2	440.5	11th
2023	NASCAR Xfinity Series	CHK Racing	0	0	0	0	0	0	NC
2025	NASCAR Xfinity Series	Joey Gase Motorsports with Scott Osteen	1	0	0	0	0	1	74th

=== NASCAR ===
(key) (Bold – Pole position awarded by qualifying time. Italics – Pole position earned by points standings or practice time. * – Most laps led.)

==== O'Reilly Auto Parts Series ====
NASCAR O'Reilly Auto Parts Series results
Year	Team	No.	Make	1	2	3	4	5	6	7	8	9	10	11	12	13	14	15	16	17	18	19	20	21	22	23	24	25	26	27	28	29	30	31	32	33	NOAPSC	Pts	Ref
2023	CHK Racing	74	Chevy	DAY	CAL	LVS	PHO	ATL	COA; DNQ	RCH	MAR	TAL	DOV	DAR	CLT	PIR	SON	NSH	CSC	ATL	NHA	POC	ROA	MCH	IRC	GLN	DAY	DAR	KAN	BRI	TEX	ROV	LVS	HOM	MAR	PHO	112th	0	
2025	Joey Gase Motorsports with Scott Osteen	35	Chevy	DAY	ATL	COA; 37	PHO	LVS	HOM	MAR	DAR	BRI	CAR	TAL	TEX	CLT	NSH	MXC	POC	ATL	CSC	SON	DOV	IND	IOW	GLN	DAY	PIR	GTW	BRI	KAN	ROV	LVS	TAL	MAR	PHO	74th	1	
2026	Barrett-Cope Racing	30	Chevy	DAY	ATL	COA; 37	PHO	LVS	DAR	MAR	CAR	BRI	KAN	TAL	TEX	GLN	DOV	CLT	NSH	POC																	53rd	15	
2026	Young's Motorsports	42	Chevy																		COR; 33	SON	CHI	ATL	IND	IOW	DAY	DAR	GTW	BRI	LVS	CLT	PHO	TAL	MAR; 27	HOM	53rd	15	
