= 2015 U.S. F2000 Winterfest =

Winter racing series

The 2015 U.S. F2000 Cooper Tires Winterfest was the fifth year of the winter racing series promoted by the U.S. F2000 National Championship. It consisted of five races held during two race meets during February 2015 and served as preparation for the 2015 U.S. F2000 National Championship.

The championship was won by Cape Motorsports driver Nico Jamin, after his race victory in the final race at Barber Motorsports Park, which awarded double points after one of the track's scheduled three races was canceled due to bad weather. Jamin finished five points clear of Afterburner Autosport's Victor Franzoni, who won two races and lost a third due to a rules infraction. A further three points behind in third place was the only other race winner, Jake Eidson of Pabst Racing Services, who won two races at NOLA Motorsports Park.

== Drivers and teams ==
Team	No.	Drivers	Notes
(United States) Afterburner Autosport	14	(United States) Michai Stephens	
(United States) Afterburner Autosport	17	(Brazil) Victor Franzoni	
(United States) Afterburner Autosport	18	(Brazil) Bruna Tomaselli	
(United States) ArmsUp Motorsports	5	(Germany) Keyvan Andres Soori	
(United States) ArmsUp Motorsports	6	(United States) Max Hanratty	
(United States) ArmsUp Motorsports	16	(Canada) James Dayson	
(United States) Cape Motorsports w/ Wayne Taylor Racing	2	(France) Nico Jamin	
(United States) Cape Motorsports w/ Wayne Taylor Racing	3	(United States) Aaron Telitz	
(United States) JAY Motorsports	12	(United States) Augie Lerch	
(United States) JDC Motorsports	80	(Canada) Parker Thompson	
(United States) John Cummiskey Racing	33	(Australia) Anthony Martin	
(United States) John Cummiskey Racing	94	(Australia) Jordan Lloyd	
(United States) M2 Autosport	79	(Colombia) Santiago Lozano	
(United States) Pabst Racing Services	22	(United States) Jake Eidson	
(United States) Pabst Racing Services	23	(China) Luo Yufeng	
(United States) Team Pelfrey	81	(Norway) Ayla Ågren	
(United States) Team Pelfrey	82	(Australia) Luke Gabin	
(United States) Team Pelfrey	83	(United States) Garth Rickards	
(United States) Team Pelfrey	84	(Russia) Nikita Lastochkin	

== Race calendar and results ==
The series schedule, along with the other Road to Indy series schedules, was announced on November 3, 2014.

Rnd	Circuit	Location	Date	Pole position	Fastest lap	Most laps led	Winning driver	Winning team
1	NOLA Motorsports Park	Avondale, Louisiana	February 19	(United States) Jake Eidson	(United States) Jake Eidson	(United States) Jake Eidson	(United States) Jake Eidson	Pabst Racing Services
2	NOLA Motorsports Park	Avondale, Louisiana	February 20		(Brazil) Victor Franzoni	(Brazil) Victor Franzoni	(Brazil) Victor Franzoni	Afterburner Autosport
3	NOLA Motorsports Park	Avondale, Louisiana	February 20		(United States) Jake Eidson	(France) Nico Jamin	(United States) Jake Eidson	Pabst Racing Services
4	Barber Motorsports Park	Birmingham, Alabama	February 25	Canceled due to weather				
5	Barber Motorsports Park	Birmingham, Alabama	February 26	(Brazil) Victor Franzoni	(United States) Jake Eidson	(Brazil) Victor Franzoni	(Brazil) Victor Franzoni	Afterburner Autosport
6	Barber Motorsports Park	Birmingham, Alabama	February 26		(United States) Aaron Telitz	(Brazil) Victor Franzoni	(France) Nico Jamin	Cape Motorsports w/ WTR

== Championship standings ==
=== Drivers' championship ===
Pos	Driver	NOL			BAR			Points
1	(France) Nico Jamin	3	2	17*	C	3	1	136
2	(Brazil) Victor Franzoni	6	1*	DSQ	C	1*	2*	131
3	(United States) Jake Eidson	**1***	3	1	C	2	14	128
4	(Australia) Anthony Martin	5	13	3	C	4	3	110
5	(United States) Aaron Telitz	2	4	5	C	14	4	108
6	(Canada) Parker Thompson	7	8	7	C	5	6	88
7	(United States) Garth Rickards	18	9	4	C	7	5	82
8	(Australia) Jordan Lloyd	4	5	2	C	6	15	76
9	(Russia) Nikita Lastochkin	8	11	13	C	12	8	66
10	(Australia) Luke Gabin	10	6	6	C	13	13	65
11	(Norway) Ayla Ågren	13	14	8	C	9	9	64
12	(United States) Michai Stephens	17	18	9	C	11	7	57
13	(United States) Augie Lerch	14	15	14	C	8	10	55
14	(United States) Max Hanratty	12	12	15	C	10	11	55
15	(Germany) Keyvan Andres Soori	9	7	11	C	DNS	DNS	36
16	(Canada) James Dayson	15	17	16	C	DNS	12	33
17	(China) Luo Yufeng	11	10	10				32
18	(Colombia) Santiago Lozano	16	16	12	C	DNS	DNS	19
Pos	Driver	NOL			BAR			Points

Color	Result
Gold	Winner
Silver	2nd place
Bronze	3rd place
Green	4th & 5th place
Light Blue	6th–10th place
Dark Blue	Finished (Outside Top 10)
Purple	Did not finish
Red	Did not qualify (DNQ)
Brown	Withdrawn (Wth)
Black	Disqualified (DSQ)
White	Did not start (DNS)
White	Race canceled (C)
Blank	Did not participate

**In-line notation**
**Bold**	Pole position (1 point)
Italics	Ran fastest race lap (1 point)
*	Led most race laps (1 point)

=== Teams' championship ===
Pos	Team	Points
1	(United States) Cape Motorsports w/ Wayne Taylor Racing	158
2	(United States) John Cummiskey Racing	116
3	(United States) Afterburner Autosport	107
4	(United States) Pabst Racing	92
5	(United States) Team Pelfrey	71
6	(United States) JDC Motorsports	60
7	(United States) JAY Motorsports	29
8	(United States) ArmsUp Motorsports	17
9	(United States) M2 Autosport	12
