= Garth Rickards =

Garth Rickards (born September 23, 1992) is an American former racing driver residing in Mechanicsburg, Pennsylvania. He graduated from Shippensburg University of Pennsylvania with a bachelor's degree in Business Administration and Management.

Rickards grew up around racing but began racing himself in 2012-2013 where he completed the Skip Barber Racing School program. The following year, 2014, Garth partnered up with Team Pelfrey in the F1600 Championship Series for his second season in open wheel racing. He received Rookie of the Year honors with one win and nine podiums. Also, Rickards was nominated for the Team USA Scholarship because of his performance in the 2014 season, where he placed second in the F1600 Championship Series.

In 2015, Rickards entered the Mazda Road to Indy in the U.S. F2000 National Championship with Team Pelfrey.

In his final racing season, Rickards competed with Carlin in the 2017 Indy Lights season taking home four top-tens.

== Complete motorsports results ==
=== American Open-Wheel racing results ===
(key) (Races in bold indicate pole position, races in italics indicate fastest race lap)

==== F1600 Championship Series ====
Year	Team	1	2	3	4	5	6	7	8	9	10	11	12	13	14	Rank	Points
2014	Team Pelfrey	ATL; 3	ATL; 5	WAT; 3	WAT; 2	VIR; 3	VIR; 5	MOH; 2	MOH; 4	PIT; 2	PIT; Ret	CON; 3	CON; 2	WAT; 1	WAT; 5	**2nd**	**479**

==== U.S. F2000 National Championship ====
Year	Team	1	2	3	4	5	6	7	8	9	10	11	12	13	14	15	16	Rank	Points
2014	JDC Motorsports	STP	STP	BAR	BAR	IMS	IMS	LOR	TOR; 16	TOR; 16	MOH	MOH	MOH	SNM	SNM			**23rd**	**10**
2015	Team Pelfrey	STP; 7	STP; 15	NOL; 11	NOL; 8	BAR; 6	BAR; 11	IMS; 7	IMS; 17	LOR; 9	TOR; 5	TOR; 6	MOH; 18	MOH; 5	MOH; 8	LAG; 9	LAG; 10	**9th**	**186**
2016	Pabst Racing Services	STP; 24	STP; 6	BAR; 9	BAR; 7	IMS; 15	IMS; 7	LOR; 7	ROA; 23	ROA; 5	TOR; 15	TOR; 17	MOH; 7	MOH; 6	MOH; 3	LAG; 12	LAG; 15	**10th**	**172**

==== U.S. F2000 National Championship - Winterfest ====
Year	Team	1	2	3	4	5	Rank	Points
2015	Team Pelfrey	NOL; 18	NOL; 9	NOL; 4	BAR; 7	BAR; 5	**7th**	**82**

==== Atlantic Championship ====
Year	Team	1	2	3	4	5	6	7	8	9	10	11	12	13	14	15	Rank	Points
2015	K-Hill Motorsports	PBI	ATL	ATL	WGL; 3	WGL; 3	VIR; 2	VIR; 3	MOH	MOH	PIT	PIT	NJMP; 3	NJMP; 2	PIT; 1	PIT; 3	**6th**	**321**

==== Indy Lights ====
Year	Team	1	2	3	4	5	6	7	8	9	10	11	12	13	14	15	16	Rank	Points
2017	Carlin	STP; 11	STP; 13	ALA; 14	ALA; 12	IMS; 10	IMS; 12	INDY; 7	ROA; 13	ROA; 13	IOW; 13	TOR; 9	TOR; 8	MOH; 13	MOH; 14	GMP; 13	WGL; DNS	14th	146
