= Robert Alon =

American racing driver

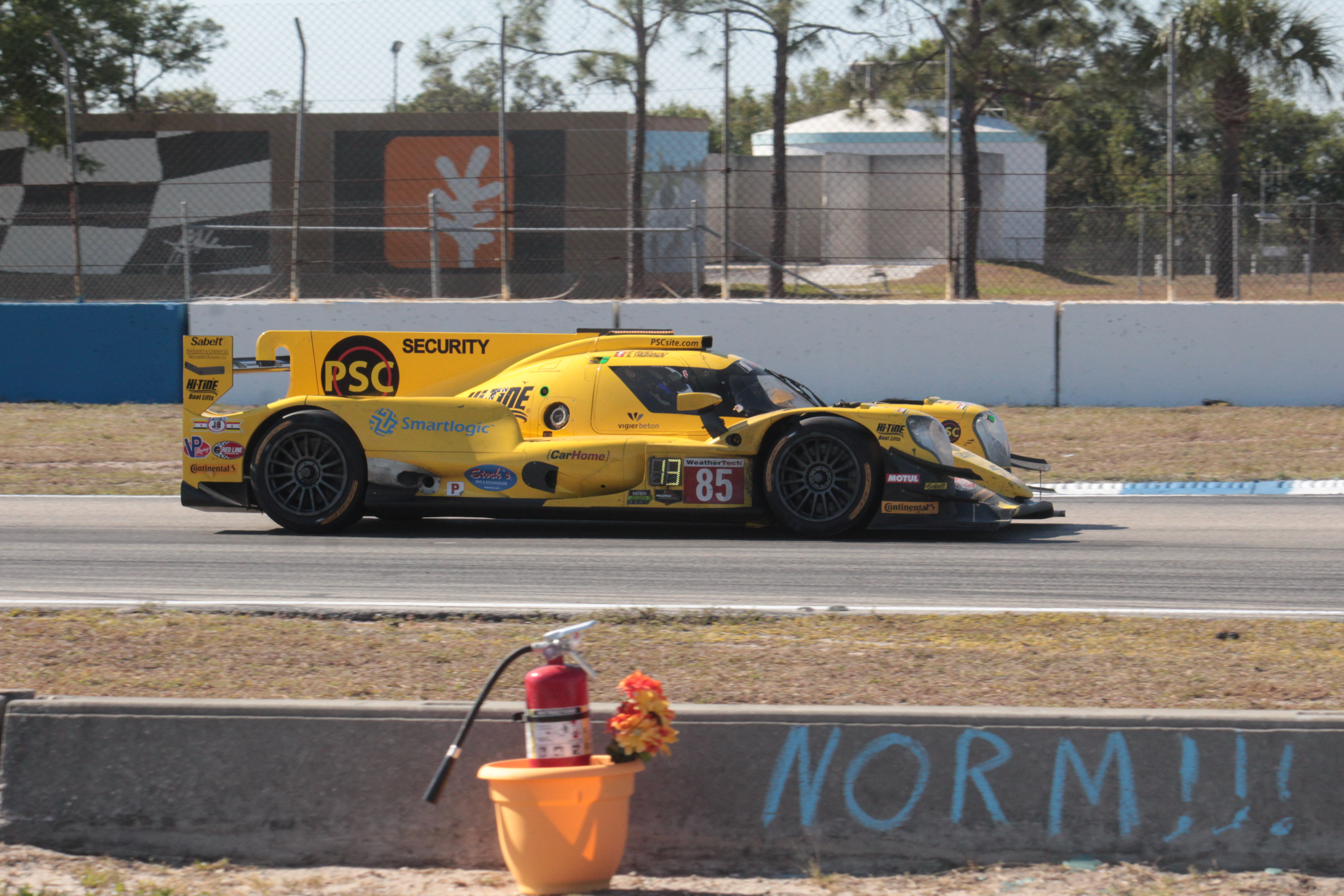
- Alon at the 2018 12 Hours of Sebring
- Nationality: American
- Born: July 10, 1990 (age 36) Santa Monica, California, U.S.
- Categorisation: FIA Silver

Robert Orr Alon (born July 10, 1990, in Santa Monica, California) is an American former racing driver who competed for JDC–Miller MotorSports in the IMSA SportsCar Championship.

== Racing record ==
=== Career summary ===
Season	Series	Team	Races	Wins	Podiums	Points	Position
2014	IMSA Cooper Tires Prototype Lites - L1	Performance Tech Motorsports	14	0	2	124	5th
2015	IMSA Cooper Tires Prototype Lites - L1	Performance Tech Motorsports	14	0	5	164	5th
2015	U.S. F2000 National Championship	JDC MotorSports	2	0	0	18	25th
2015	US Prototype Championship Series - PR-1		2	2	2	63	3rd
2016	IMSA SportsCar Championship - Prototype Challenge	PR1/Mathiasen Motorsports	11	3	9	355	2nd
2017	IMSA Sportscar Championship - GTD	3GT Racing	12	0	0	252	12th
2018	IMSA Sportscar Championship - Prototype	JDC-Miller MotorSports	10	0	0	216	11th

== Motorsports career results ==
=== American open–wheel racing ===
(key) (Races in bold indicate pole position; races in italics indicate fastest lap)

==== U.S. F2000 National Championship ====
Year	Team	1	2	3	4	5	6	7	8	9	10	11	12	13	14	15	16	Rank	Points
2015	JDC MotorSports	STP	STP	NOL	NOL	BAR	BAR	IMS	IMS	LOR	TOR	TOR	MOH	MOH	MOH	LAG; 12	LAG; 12	25th	18

=== WeatherTech SportsCar Championship results ===
(key)(Races in bold indicate pole position. Races in italics indicate fastest race lap in class. Results are overall/class)

Year	Entrant	Class	Chassis	Engine	1	2	3	4	5	6	7	8	9	10	11	12	Rank	Points
2016	PR1/Mathiasen Motorsports	PC	Oreca FLM09	Chevrolet LS3 6.2 L V8	DAY; 2	SEB; 2	LBH; 6	LGA; 1	DET; 3	WGL; 5	MOS; 3	LIM; 2	ELK; 1	COA; 2	PET; 1		2nd	355
2017	3GT Racing	GTD	Lexus RC F GT3	Lexus 5.0 L V8	DAY; 14	SEB; 13	LBH; 11	COA; 13	DET; 7	WGL; 5	MOS; 12	LIM; 7	ELK; 8	VIR; 7	LGA; 14	PET; 10	12th	252
2018	JDC-Miller MotorSports	P	Oreca 07	Gibson GK428 4.2 L V8	DAY; 6	SEB; 9	LBH; 13	MOH; 12	DET; 10	WGL; 8	MOS; 8	**ELK**; 12	LGA; 7	PET; 9			11th	216
