= 2017 Continental Tire Road Race Showcase =

Ninth round of the 2017 IMSA SportsCar Championship

Track map of Road America

The 2017 Continental Tire Road Race Showcase was a sports car race sanctioned by the International Motor Sports Association (IMSA). The Race was held at Road America in Elkhart Lake, Wisconsin on August 6, 2017. The race was the ninth round of the 2017 IMSA SportsCar Championship.

== Background ==
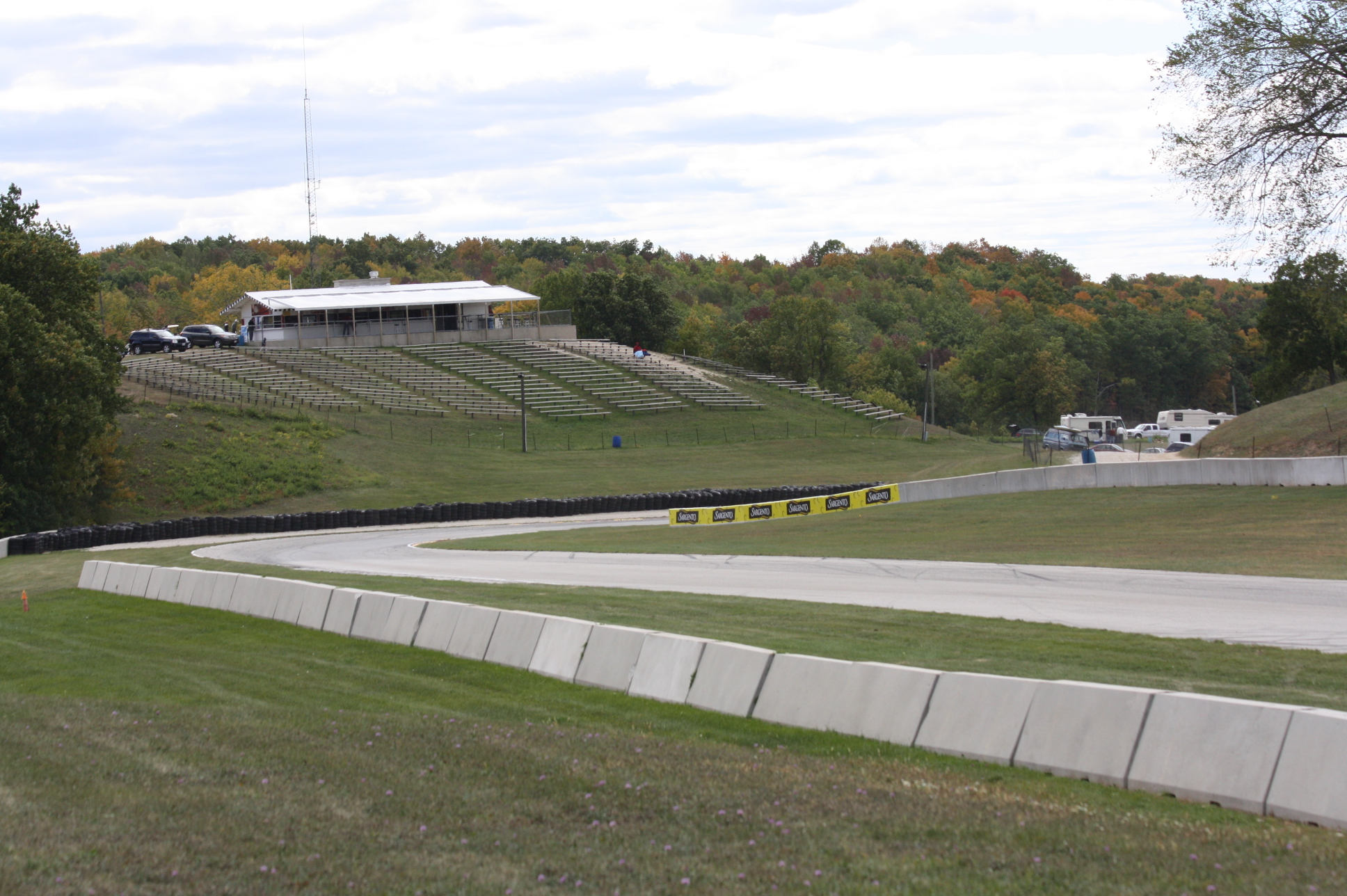
Road America, where the race was held.

IMSA's president Scott Atherton confirmed the Continental Tire Road Race Showcase was part of the series' schedule for the 2017 IMSA SportsCar Championship at Road America's victory lane in August 2016. It was the fourth consecutive year the event was held as part of the WeatherTech SportsCar Championship. The 2017 Continental Tire Road Race Showcase was the ninth of twelve scheduled sports car races of 2017 by IMSA, and was the sixth round not held on the held as part of the North American Endurance Cup. The race was held at the fourteen-turn 4.048 mi (6.515 km) Road America in Elkhart Lake, Wisconsin on August 6, 2017. After the Northeast Grand Prix two weeks earlier, Jordan Taylor and Ricky Taylor led the Prototype Drivers' Championship with 226 points, ahead of João Barbosa and Christian Fittipaldi with 207 points, and Misha Goikhberg and Stephen Simpson with 200 points. With 216 points, the PC Drivers' Championship was led by James French and Patricio O'Ward with a thirty-four point advantage over Don Yount. Antonio García and Jan Magnussen led the GTLM Drivers' Championship with 211 points, ahead of Joey Hand and Dirk Müller with 204 points. In GTD, the Drivers' Championship was led by Alessandro Balzan and Christina Nielsen with 228 points, ahead of Ben Keating and Jeroen Bleekemolen with 211 points. Cadillac, Chevrolet, and Mercedes-AMG were leading their respective Manufacturers' Championships, while Wayne Taylor Racing, Performance Tech Motorsports, Corvette Racing, and Scuderia Corsa each led their own Teams' Championships.

During this race weekend, IMSA holds their "State of the Series" annual press conference, in which they confirm and announce their future plans for the series they sanction.

On July 27, 2017, IMSA released the latest technical bulletin outlining Balance of performance for the event. In GTLM, the Ford GT received an increase in turbo boost pressure.

== Entries ==
A total of 34 cars took part in the event split across 4 classes. 8 cars were entered in P, 3 in PC, 8 in GTLM, and 15 in GTD. In P, José Gutiérrez and Olivier Pla replaced David Ostella and Nicholas Boulle in the PR1/Mathiasen Motorsports entry. VisitFlorida Racing switched from the Riley Mk. 30 to the Ligier JS P217. Mazda Motorsports were absent after Joest Racing took over the RT24-P program and undergo extensive testing. As a result, the team would not contest the remaining races of the season and SpeedSource would shut down. In PC, Gustavo Yacamán joined Mark Kvamme in the #26 BAR1 Motorsports entry. In GTD, Alex Job Racing and TRG skipped the event. Lone Star Racing made their first appearance since the Circuit of the Americas round. Michael de Quesada returned to the Alegra Motorsports entry. Scott Pruett and Robert Alon swapped seats in the 3GT Racing entries. Riley Motorsports - WeatherTech Racing switched from the Mercedes-AMG GT3 to the Porsche 911 GT3 R due to BOP concerns.

== Practice ==
There were three practice sessions preceding the start of the race on Sunday, two on Friday and one on Saturday. The first two one-hour sessions were on Friday morning and afternoon. The third on Saturday morning lasted an hour.

=== Practice 1 ===
The first practice session took place at 11:20 am CT on Friday and ended with Marc Goossens topping the charts for VisitFlorida Racing, with a lap time of 1:59.977. The PC class was topped by the #38 Performance Tech Motorsports Oreca FLM09 of James French with a time of 2:07.523. Patrick Pilet was fastest in GTLM while Patrick Lindsey set the fastest time in GTD.

Pos.	Class	No.	Team	Driver	Time	Gap
1	P	90	VisitFlorida Racing	Marc Goossens	1:59.977	_
2	P	5	Mustang Sampling Racing	Christian Fittipaldi	2:00.890	+0.913
3	P	52	PR1/Mathiasen Motorsports	Oliver Pla	2:01.029	+1.052

=== Practice 2 ===
The second practice session took place at 4:10 pm CT on Friday and ended with Stephen Simpson topping the charts for JDC-Miller MotorSports, with a lap time of 1:55.057. Patricio O'Ward set the fastest time in PC. The GTLM class was topped by the #66 Ford Chip Ganassi Racing Ford GT of Dirk Müller with a time of 2:03.967. Antonio García was second in the #3 Corvette Racing entry and Bill Auberlen rounded out the top 3. Colin Braun was fastest in GTD.

Pos.	Class	No.	Team	Driver	Time	Gap
1	P	85	JDC-Miller MotorSports	Stephen Simpson	1:55.057	_
2	P	5	Mustang Sampling Racing	João Barbosa	1:55.161	+0.104
3	P	31	Whelen Engineering Racing	Dane Cameron	1:55.224	+0.167

=== Practice 3 ===
The third and final practice session took place at 8:55 am CT on Saturday and ended with Ryan Dalziel topping the charts for Tequila Patrón ESM, with a lap time of 1:53.851. Patricio O'Ward set the fastest time PC by 2.984 seconds ahead of Buddy Rice in the #20 BAR1 Motorsports entry. The GTLM class was topped by the #24 BMW Team RLL BMW M6 GTLM of Martin Tomczyk with a time of 2:02.129. Lawson Aschenbach was fastest in GTD. The session ended early after Katherine Legge crashed at Canada Corner. The car suffered heavy damage to the front, but Legge was uninjured and exited her car.

Pos.	Class	No.	Team	Driver	Time	Gap
1	P	2	Tequila Patrón ESM	Ryan Dalziel	1:53.851	_
2	P	10	Wayne Taylor Racing	Jordan Taylor	1:53.994	+0.143
3	P	85	JDC-Miller MotorSports	Stephen Simpson	1:54.040	+0.189

== Qualifying ==
In Saturday afternoon's 90-minute four-group qualifying, each category had separate 15-minute sessions. Regulations stipulated that teams nominate one qualifying driver, with the fastest laps determining each class' starting order. IMSA arranged the grid to put Prototypes ahead of the PC, GTLM and GTD cars.

The first was for cars in GTD class. Jeroen Mul qualified on pole for the class driving the #16 car for Change Racing, besting Jesse Krohn in the Turner Motorsport entry.

The second session of qualifying was for cars in the GTLM class. Dirk Müller qualified on pole driving the #66 car for Ford Chip Ganassi Racing, beating Ryan Briscoe in the sister #67 entry Ford Chip Ganassi Racing by over seven tenths of a second.

The third session of qualifying was for cars in the PC class. James French set the fastest time driving the #38 Performance Tech Motorsports entry.

The final session of qualifying was for the P class. Ricky Taylor qualified on pole driving the #10 car for Wayne Taylor Racing, besting José Gutiérrez in the #52 entry from PR1/Mathiasen Motorsports.

=== Qualifying results ===
Pole positions in each class are indicated in bold and by ‡.

Pos.	Class	No.	Team	Driver	Time	Gap	Grid
1	**P**	**10**	**(United States) Wayne Taylor Racing**	**(United States) Ricky Taylor**	**1:53.058**	**_**	1‡
2	P	52	(United States) PR1/Mathiasen Motorsports	(Mexico) José Gutiérrez	1:54.075	+1.017	2
3	P	2	(United States) Tequila Patrón ESM	(United States) Scott Sharp	1:54.088	+1.030	3
4	P	90	(United States) VisitFlorida Racing	(Belgium) Marc Goossens	1:54.186	+1.128	4
5	P	22	(United States) Tequila Patrón ESM	(United States) Johannes van Overbeek	1:54.189	+1.131	5
6	P	31	(United States) Whelen Racing Engineering	(United States) Eric Curran	1:54.222	+1.164	6
7	P	5	(United States) Mustang Sampling Racing	(Brazil) Christian Fittipaldi	1:54.588	+1.530	11^{1}
8	P	85	(United States) JDC-Miller MotorSports	(Canada) Mikhail Goikhberg	1:54.648	+1.590	7
9	**PC**	**38**	**(United States) Performance Tech Motorsports**	**(United States) James French**	**1:59.149**	**+6.091**	8‡
10	**GTLM**	**66**	**(United States) Ford Chip Ganassi Racing**	**(Germany) Dirk Müller**	**2:01.422**	**+8.364**	12‡
11	PC	20	(United States) BAR1 Motorsports	(United States) Don Yount	2:02.128	+9.070	9
12	GTLM	67	(United States) Ford Chip Ganassi Racing	(Australia) Ryan Briscoe	2:02.203	+9.145	13
13	GTLM	25	(United States) BMW Team RLL	(United Kingdom) Alexander Sims	2:02.211	+9.153	14
14	GTLM	912	(United States) Porsche GT Team	(Italy) Gianmaria Bruni	2:02.440	+9.382	15
15	GTLM	24	(United States) BMW Team RLL	(Germany) Martin Tomczyk	2:02.583	+9.525	33^{2}
16	GTLM	911	(United States) Porsche GT Team	(France) Patrick Pilet	2:02.670	+9.612	16
17	GTLM	4	(United States) Corvette Racing	(United Kingdom) Oliver Gavin	2:03.358	+10.300	17
18	GTLM	3	(United States) Corvette Racing	(Denmark) Jan Magnussen	2:03.581	+10.523	18
19	PC	26	(United States) BAR1 Motorsports	(United States) Mark Kvamme	2:04.817	+11.759	10
20	**GTD**	**16**	**(United States) Change Racing**	**(Netherlands) Jeroen Mul**	**2:06.649**	**+13.591**	19‡
21	GTD	96	(United States) Turner Motorsport	(Finland) Jesse Krohn	2:06.823	+13.765	20
22	GTD	73	(United States) Park Place Motorsports	(United States) Patrick Lindsey	2:07.149	+14.091	21
23	GTD	15	(United States) 3GT Racing	(United States) Scott Pruett	2:07.170	+14.112	22
24	GTD	57	(United States) Stevenson Motorsports	(United States) Andrew Davis	2:07.403	+14.345	23
25	GTD	48	(United States) Paul Miller Racing	(United States) Madison Snow	2:07.415	+14.357	35^{3}
26	GTD	86	(United States) Michael Shank Racing with Curb-Agajanian	(Brazil) Oswaldo Negri Jr.	2:07.469	+14.411	24
27	GTD	63	(United States) Scuderia Corsa	(Denmark) Christina Nielsen	2:07.477	+14.419	25
28	GTD	33	(United States) Riley Motorsports - Team AMG	(United States) Ben Keating	2:07.793	+14.735	26
29	GTD	14	(United States) 3GT Racing	(United States) Robert Alon	2:07.984	+14.926	27
30	GTD	50	(United States) Riley Motorsports - WeatherTech Racing	(United States) Cooper MacNeil	2:08.979	+15.921	28
31	GTD	75	(United States) SunEnergy1 Racing	(Australia) Kenny Habul	2:09.321	+16.263	32^{4}
32	GTD	54	(United States) CORE Autosport	(United States) Jon Bennett	2:09.547	+16.489	29
33	GTD	28	(United States) Alegra Motorsports	(United States) Michael de Quesada	2:10.442	+17.384	34^{5}
34	GTD	80	(United States) Lone Star Racing	(United States) Dan Knox	Disqualified		30
35	GTD	93	(United States) Michael Shank Racing with Curb-Agajanian	Did Not Participate			31^{6}
Sources:

- ^{1} The No. 5 Mustang Sampling Racing entry was moved to the back of the P field as per Article 43.6 of the Sporting regulations (Change of starting tires).
- ^{2} The No. 24 BMW Team RLL entry was moved to the back of the GTLM field as per Articles 40.2.12 and 43.6 of the Sporting regulations (Engine change) and (Change of starting tires).
- ^{3} The No. 48 Paul Miller Racing entry initially qualified sixth for the GTD class. However, their car failed post qualifying inspection after the team's Lamborghini was using unhomologated parts as well as not meeting technical compliance. The car's ECU was also confiscated by IMSA. As a result, Paul Miller Racing were fined $7,500, and received a 15-point penalty in the Drivers' and Teams' Championships.
- ^{4} The No. 75 SunEnergy1 Racing entry was moved to the back of the GTD field as per Article 43.6 of the Sporting regulations (Change of starting tires).
- ^{5} The No. 28 Alegra Motorsports entry was moved to the back of the GTD field as per Article 43.6 of the Sporting regulations (Change of starting tires).
- ^{6} The No. 93 Michael Shank Racing with Curb-Agajanian entry was moved to the back of the GTD as per Article 43.5 of the Sporting regulations (Change of starting driver).

== Race ==
=== Post-race ===
The result kept Jordan Taylor and Ricky Taylor atop the Prototype Drivers' Championship with 258 points, 26 points ahead of sixth-place finishers Barbosa and Fittipaldi. As a result of winning the race, French and O'Ward clinched the PC Drivers' Championship with 1 race left for the category. In the GTLM Drivers' Championship, Hand and Müller advanced from third to second. The result kept Balzan and Nielsen atop the GTD Drivers' Championship while Aschenbach and Davis advanced from fifth to third. Cadillac, and Ferrari continued to top their respective Manufacturers' Championships. Ford took the lead of the GTLM Manufactures' Championship while Wayne Taylor Racing, Performance Tech Motorsports, Corvette Racing, and Scuderia Corsa kept their respective advantages in the Teams' Championships with three rounds left in the season.

=== Results ===
Class winners are denoted in bold and ‡.

Final race classification
Pos	Class	No.	Team	Drivers	Chassis	Tire	Laps	Time/Retired
Pos	Class	No.	Team	Drivers	Engine	Tire	Laps	Time/Retired
1	**P**	**22**	**(United States) Tequila Patrón ESM**	**(United States) Johannes van Overbeek (Brazil) Pipo Derani**	**Nissan Onroak DPi**	C	**71**	**2:40.35.461‡**
1	**P**	**22**	**(United States) Tequila Patrón ESM**	**(United States) Johannes van Overbeek (Brazil) Pipo Derani**	**Nissan VR38DETT 3.8 L Turbo V6**	C	**71**	**2:40.35.461‡**
2	P	10	(United States) Wayne Taylor Racing	(United States) Ricky Taylor (United States) Jordan Taylor	Cadillac DPi-V.R	C	71	+2.356
2	P	10	(United States) Wayne Taylor Racing	(United States) Ricky Taylor (United States) Jordan Taylor	Cadillac 6.2 L V8	C	71	+2.356
3	P	2	(United States) Tequila Patrón ESM	(United States) Scott Sharp (United Kingdom) Ryan Dalziel	Nissan Onroak DPi	C	71	+2.718
3	P	2	(United States) Tequila Patrón ESM	(United States) Scott Sharp (United Kingdom) Ryan Dalziel	Nissan VR38DETT 3.8 L Turbo V6	C	71	+2.718
4	P	31	(United States) Whelen Engineering Racing	(United States) Dane Cameron (United States) Eric Curran	Cadillac DPi-V.R	C	71	+5.385
4	P	31	(United States) Whelen Engineering Racing	(United States) Dane Cameron (United States) Eric Curran	Cadillac 6.2 L V8	C	71	+5.385
5	P	90	(United States) VisitFlorida Racing	(Belgium) Marc Goossens (Netherlands) Renger van der Zande	Ligier JS P217	C	71	+6.999
5	P	90	(United States) VisitFlorida Racing	(Belgium) Marc Goossens (Netherlands) Renger van der Zande	Gibson GK428 4.2 L V8	C	71	+6.999
6	P	5	(United States) Mustang Sampling Racing	(Portugal) João Barbosa (Brazil) Christian Fittipaldi	Cadillac DPi-V.R	C	71	+9.714
6	P	5	(United States) Mustang Sampling Racing	(Portugal) João Barbosa (Brazil) Christian Fittipaldi	Cadillac 6.2 L V8	C	71	+9.714
7	P	85	(United States) JDC-Miller MotorSports	(Canada) Mikhail Goikhberg (South Africa) Stephen Simpson	Oreca 07	C	71	+11.219
7	P	85	(United States) JDC-Miller MotorSports	(Canada) Mikhail Goikhberg (South Africa) Stephen Simpson	Gibson GK428 4.2 L V8	C	71	+11.219
8	P	52	(United States) PR1/Mathiasen Motorsports	(France) Olivier Pla (Mexico) José Gutiérrez	Ligier JS P217	C	71	+1:37.992
8	P	52	(United States) PR1/Mathiasen Motorsports	(France) Olivier Pla (Mexico) José Gutiérrez	Gibson GK428 4.2 L V8	C	71	+1:37.992
9	**PC**	**38**	**(United States) Performance Tech Motorsports**	**(United States) James French (Mexico) Patricio O'Ward**	**Oreca FLM09**	C	**70**	**+1 lap‡**
9	**PC**	**38**	**(United States) Performance Tech Motorsports**	**(United States) James French (Mexico) Patricio O'Ward**	**Chevrolet 6.2 L V8**	C	**70**	**+1 lap‡**
10	PC	26	(United States) BAR1 Motorsports	(Colombia) Gustavo Yacamán (United States) Mark Kvamme	Oreca FLM09	C	70	+1 lap
10	PC	26	(United States) BAR1 Motorsports	(Colombia) Gustavo Yacamán (United States) Mark Kvamme	Chevrolet 6.2 L V8	C	70	+1 lap
11	**GTLM**	**66**	**(United States) Ford Chip Ganassi Racing**	**(Germany) Dirk Müller (United States) Joey Hand**	**Ford GT**	MI	**69**	**+2 Laps‡**
11	**GTLM**	**66**	**(United States) Ford Chip Ganassi Racing**	**(Germany) Dirk Müller (United States) Joey Hand**	**Ford EcoBoost 3.5 L Twin-turbo V6**	MI	**69**	**+2 Laps‡**
12	GTLM	912	(United States) Porsche GT Team	(Italy) Gianmaria Bruni (Belgium) Laurens Vanthoor	Porsche 911 RSR	MI	69	+2 Laps
12	GTLM	912	(United States) Porsche GT Team	(Italy) Gianmaria Bruni (Belgium) Laurens Vanthoor	Porsche 4.0 L Flat-6	MI	69	+2 Laps
13	GTLM	67	(United States) Ford Chip Ganassi Racing	(Australia) Ryan Briscoe (United Kingdom) Richard Westbrook	Ford GT	MI	69	+2 Laps
13	GTLM	67	(United States) Ford Chip Ganassi Racing	(Australia) Ryan Briscoe (United Kingdom) Richard Westbrook	Ford EcoBoost 3.5 L Twin-turbo V6	MI	69	+2 Laps
14	GTLM	3	(United States) Corvette Racing	(Denmark) Jan Magnussen (Spain) Antonio García	Chevrolet Corvette C7.R	MI	69	+2 Laps
14	GTLM	3	(United States) Corvette Racing	(Denmark) Jan Magnussen (Spain) Antonio García	Chevrolet LT5.5 5.5 L V8	MI	69	+2 Laps
15	GTLM	4	(United States) Corvette Racing	(United Kingdom) Oliver Gavin (United States) Tommy Milner	Chevrolet Corvette C7.R	MI	69	+2 Laps
15	GTLM	4	(United States) Corvette Racing	(United Kingdom) Oliver Gavin (United States) Tommy Milner	Chevrolet LT5.5 5.5 L V8	MI	69	+2 Laps
16	GTLM	25	(United States) BMW Team RLL	(United States) Bill Auberlen (United Kingdom) Alexander Sims	BMW M6 GTLM	MI	69	+2 Laps
16	GTLM	25	(United States) BMW Team RLL	(United States) Bill Auberlen (United Kingdom) Alexander Sims	BMW 4.4 L Turbo V8	MI	69	+2 Laps
17	**GTD**	**96**	**(United States) Turner Motorsport**	**(Germany) Jens Klingmann (Finland) Jesse Krohn**	**BMW M6 GT3**	C	**68**	**+3 Laps‡**
17	**GTD**	**96**	**(United States) Turner Motorsport**	**(Germany) Jens Klingmann (Finland) Jesse Krohn**	**BMW 4.4L Turbo V8**	C	**68**	**+3 Laps‡**
18	GTD	73	(United States) Park Place Motorsports	(Germany) Jörg Bergmeister (United States) Patrick Lindsey	Porsche 911 GT3 R	C	68	+3 Laps
18	GTD	73	(United States) Park Place Motorsports	(Germany) Jörg Bergmeister (United States) Patrick Lindsey	Porsche 4.0 L Flat-6	C	68	+3 Laps
19	GTD	57	(United States) Stevenson Motorsports	(United States) Andrew Davis (United States) Lawson Aschenbach	Audi R8 LMS	C	68	+3 Laps
19	GTD	57	(United States) Stevenson Motorsports	(United States) Andrew Davis (United States) Lawson Aschenbach	Audi 5.2L V10	C	68	+3 Laps
20	GTD	33	(United States) Riley Motorsports – Team AMG	(Netherlands) Jeroen Bleekemolen (United States) Ben Keating	Mercedes-AMG GT3	C	68	+3 Laps
20	GTD	33	(United States) Riley Motorsports – Team AMG	(Netherlands) Jeroen Bleekemolen (United States) Ben Keating	Mercedes AMG M159 6.2 L V8	C	68	+3 Laps
21	GTD	63	(United States) Scuderia Corsa	(Denmark) Christina Nielsen (Italy) Alessandro Balzan	Ferrari 488 GT3	C	68	+3 Laps
21	GTD	63	(United States) Scuderia Corsa	(Denmark) Christina Nielsen (Italy) Alessandro Balzan	Ferrari F154CB 3.9 L Turbo V8	C	68	+3 Laps
22	GTD	48	(United States) Paul Miller Racing	(United States) Bryan Sellers (United States) Madison Snow	Lamborghini Huracán GT3	C	67	+4 Laps
22	GTD	48	(United States) Paul Miller Racing	(United States) Bryan Sellers (United States) Madison Snow	Lamborghini 5.2 L V10	C	67	+4 Laps
23	GTD	54	(United States) CORE Autosport	(United States) Jon Bennett (United States) Colin Braun	Porsche 911 GT3 R	C	67	+4 Laps
23	GTD	54	(United States) CORE Autosport	(United States) Jon Bennett (United States) Colin Braun	Porsche 4.0 L Flat-6	C	67	+4 Laps
24	GTD	14	(United States) 3GT Racing	(United States) Robert Alon (United States) Sage Karam	Lexus RC F GT3	C	67	+4 Laps
24	GTD	14	(United States) 3GT Racing	(United States) Robert Alon (United States) Sage Karam	Lexus 5.0L V8	C	67	+4 Laps
25	GTD	50	(United States) Riley Motorsports – WeatherTech Racing	(United States) Cooper MacNeil (United States) Gunnar Jeannette	Porsche 911 GT3 R	C	67	+4 Laps
25	GTD	50	(United States) Riley Motorsports – WeatherTech Racing	(United States) Cooper MacNeil (United States) Gunnar Jeannette	Porsche 4.0 L Flat-6	C	67	+4 Laps
26	GTD	15	(United States) 3GT Racing	(United States) Scott Pruett (United Kingdom) Jack Hawksworth	Lexus RC F GT3	C	67	+4 Laps
26	GTD	15	(United States) 3GT Racing	(United States) Scott Pruett (United Kingdom) Jack Hawksworth	Lexus 5.0L V8	C	67	+4 Laps
27	GTLM	24	(United States) BMW Team RLL	(United States) John Edwards (Germany) Martin Tomczyk	BMW M6 GTLM	MI	67	+4 Laps
27	GTLM	24	(United States) BMW Team RLL	(United States) John Edwards (Germany) Martin Tomczyk	BMW 4.4 L Turbo V8	MI	67	+4 Laps
28	GTD	28	(United States) Alegra Motorsports	(United States) Michael de Quesada (Canada) Daniel Morad	Porsche 911 GT3 R	C	66	+5 Laps
28	GTD	28	(United States) Alegra Motorsports	(United States) Michael de Quesada (Canada) Daniel Morad	Porsche 4.0 L Flat-6	C	66	+5 Laps
29	GTD	75	(United States) SunEnergy1 Racing	(France) Tristan Vautier (Australia) Kenny Habul	Mercedes-AMG GT3	C	64	+7 Laps
29	GTD	75	(United States) SunEnergy1 Racing	(France) Tristan Vautier (Australia) Kenny Habul	Mercedes AMG M159 6.2 L V8	C	64	+7 Laps
30	GTD	16	(United States) Change Racing	(United States) Corey Lewis (Netherlands) Jeroen Mul	Lamborghini Huracán GT3	C	64	+7 Laps
30	GTD	16	(United States) Change Racing	(United States) Corey Lewis (Netherlands) Jeroen Mul	Lamborghini 5.2 L V10	C	64	+7 Laps
31	PC	20	(United States) BAR1 Motorsports	(United States) Don Yount (United States) Buddy Rice	Oreca FLM09	C	60	+11 Laps
31	PC	20	(United States) BAR1 Motorsports	(United States) Don Yount (United States) Buddy Rice	Chevrolet 6.2 L V8	C	60	+11 Laps
32 DNF	GTLM	911	(United States) Porsche GT Team	(France) Patrick Pilet (Germany) Dirk Werner	Porsche 911 RSR	MI	55	Gearbox
32 DNF	GTLM	911	(United States) Porsche GT Team	(France) Patrick Pilet (Germany) Dirk Werner	Porsche 4.0 L Flat-6	MI	55	Gearbox
33 DNF	GTD	86	(United States) Michael Shank Racing with Curb Agajanian	(United States) Jeff Segal (Brazil) Oswaldo Negri Jr.	Acura NSX GT3	C	47	Puncture
33 DNF	GTD	86	(United States) Michael Shank Racing with Curb Agajanian	(United States) Jeff Segal (Brazil) Oswaldo Negri Jr.	Acura 3.5 L Turbo V6	C	47	Puncture
34 DNF	GTD	93	(United States) Michael Shank Racing with Curb Agajanian	(United States) Andy Lally (United Kingdom) Katherine Legge	Acura NSX GT3	C	43	Crash
34 DNF	GTD	93	(United States) Michael Shank Racing with Curb Agajanian	(United States) Andy Lally (United Kingdom) Katherine Legge	Acura 3.5 L Turbo V6	C	43	Crash
35 DNF	GTD	80	(United States) Lone Star Racing	(United States) Dan Knox (United States) Mike Skeen	Mercedes-AMG GT3	C	--	Did Not Start
35 DNF	GTD	80	(United States) Lone Star Racing	(United States) Dan Knox (United States) Mike Skeen	Mercedes AMG M159 6.2 L V8	C	--	Did Not Start

Tyre manufacturers
Key
Symbol	Tyre manufacturer
**C**	Continental
**MI**	Michelin

== Standings after the race ==
Prototype Drivers' Championship standings
Pos.	+/–	Driver	Points
1		(United States) Jordan Taylor (United States) Ricky Taylor	258
2		(Portugal) João Barbosa (Brazil) Christian Fittipaldi	232
3	1	(United States) Dane Cameron (United States) Eric Curran	227
4	1	(Canada) Misha Goikhberg (South Africa) Stephen Simpson	224
5		(United Kingdom) Ryan Dalziel (United States) Scott Sharp	213

PC Drivers' Championship standings
Pos.	+/–	Driver	Points
1		(United States) James French (Mexico) Patricio O'Ward	252
2		(United States) Don Yount	212
3		(United States) Buddy Rice	150
4	1	(Colombia) Gustavo Yacamán	121
5	1	(United States) Kyle Masson	108

GTLM Drivers' Championship standings
Pos.	+/–	Driver	Points
1		(Spain) Antonio García (Denmark) Jan Magnussen	239
2	1	(United States) Bill Auberlen (United Kingdom) Alexander Sims	231
3	1	(United States) Joey Hand (Germany) Dirk Müller	230
4		(Australia) Ryan Briscoe (United Kingdom) Richard Westbrook	225
5		(France) Patrick Pilet (Germany) Dirk Werner	217

GTD Drivers' Championship standings
Pos.	+/–	Driver	Points
1		(Italy) Alessandro Balzan (Denmark) Christina Nielsen	254
2		(Netherlands) Jeroen Bleekemolen (United States) Ben Keating	239
3	2	(United States) Lawson Aschenbach (United States) Andrew Davis	225
4	1	(United States) Andy Lally (United Kingdom) Katherine Legge	221
5	1	(Germany) Jens Klingmann	220

- Note: Only the top five positions are included for all sets of standings.

Prototype Teams' Championship standings
Pos.	+/–	Team	Points
1		(United States) #10 Wayne Taylor Racing	258
2		(United States) #5 Mustang Sampling Racing	232
3	1	(United States) #31 Whelen Engineering Racing	227
4	1	(United States) #85 JDC-Miller MotorSports	224
5		(United States) #2 Tequila Patrón ESM	213

PC Teams' Championship standings
Pos.	+/–	Team	Points
1		(United States) #38 Performance Tech Motorsports	252
2		(United States) #26 BAR1 Motorsports	217
3		(United States) #20 BAR1 Motorsports	212
4		(United States) #8 Starworks Motorsport	58
5		(United States) #88 Starworks Motorsport	28

GTLM Teams' Championship standings
Pos.	+/–	Team	Points
1		(United States) #3 Corvette Racing	239
2	1	(United States) #66 Ford Chip Ganassi Racing	231
3	1	(United States) #25 BMW Team RLL	230
4		(United States) #67 Ford Chip Ganassi Racing	225
5		(United States) #911 Porsche GT Team	217

GTD Teams' Championship standings
Pos.	+/–	Team	Points
1		(United States) #63 Scuderia Corsa	254
2		(United States) #33 Riley Motorsports Team AMG	239
3	2	(United States) #57 Stevenson Motorsports	225
4	1	(United States) #93 Michael Shank Racing with Curb-Agajanian	221
5	1	(United States) #96 Turner Motorsport	220

- Note: Only the top five positions are included for all sets of standings.

Prototype Manufacturers' Championship standings
Pos.	+/–	Manufacturer	Points
1		(United States) Cadillac	277
2		(Japan) Nissan	253
3		(Japan) Mazda	216

GTLM Manufacturers' Championship standings
Pos.	+/–	Manufacturer	Points
1	1	(United States) Ford	254
2	1	(United States) Chevrolet	253
3		(Germany) BMW	244
4		(Germany) Porsche	241
5		(Italy) Ferrari	112

GTD Manufacturers' Championship standings
Pos.	+/–	Manufacturer	Points
1		(Italy) Ferrari	264
2		(Germany) Mercedes-AMG	263
3	2	(Germany) Porsche	257
4	1	(Japan) Acura	255
5	1	(Germany) Audi	251

- Note: Only the top five positions are included for all sets of standings.

IMSA SportsCar Championship
Previous race: Northeast Grand Prix	2017 season	Next race: Michelin GT Challenge at VIR
