= Parker Thompson =

Canadian racing driver

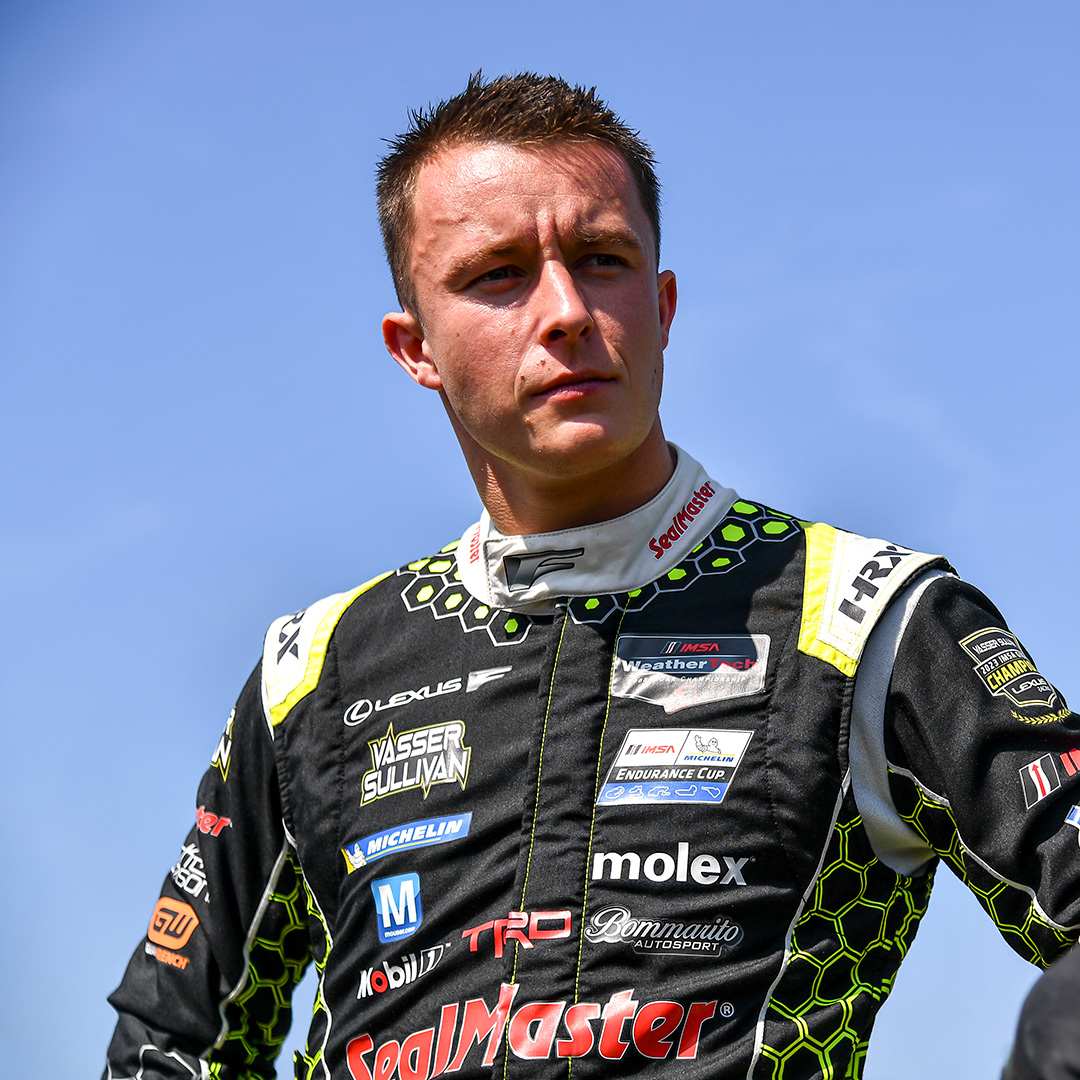
- Thompson in 2024
- Nationality: (Canada) Canadian
- Born: 2 March 1998 (age 28) Red Deer, Alberta, Canada

IMSA SportsCar Championship career
- Debut season: 2023
- Current team: Bryan Herta Autosport with PR1/Mathiasen Motorsports
- Categorisation: FIA Silver
- Car number: 52
- Former teams: Vasser Sullivan Racing
- Starts: 30
- Wins: 2
- Podiums: 8
- Poles: 7
- Fastest laps: 1
- Best finish: 1st in 2024

Previous series
- 2015–2017 2018–2020 2019 2021–2022 2023: U.S. F2000 National Championship; Indy Pro 2000 Championship; Canadian Touring Car Championship; Porsche Carrera Cup North America; GT4 America Series; IMSA SportsCar Championship

Parker Thompson (born 2 March 1998) is a Canadian race car driver from Red Deer, Alberta, Canada. He currently competes in the IMSA SportsCar Championship in the LMP2 class for Bryan Herta Autosport with PR1/Mathiasen Motorsports, and in the FIA World Endurance Championship in the LMGT3 for Team WRT.

== Career ==
=== Early career ===
Thompson began racing at the age of eight, competing in the Calgary Kart Racing Club a short distance from his family residence in Red Deer, Alberta, Canada. From the local club, Thompson graduated to the global ranks of karting. In 2012, he finished third in the junior category of the Rotax World Karting Finals in Portimao, Portugal. In 2013, he joined the World Series of Karting with team Energy Corse where he earned eight top five finishes, four podium finishes, five Superpole sessions, two Superpole wins and a final win.

=== Open wheel career ===
In 2015, Thompson began competition in open-wheel racing, with a focus on the Road to Indy. Thompson finished second place overall in the 2016 U.S. F2000 Championship with Cape Motorsports. In 2018, he finished second place overall again, this time in the Pro Mazda Championship, with Exclusive Autosport. After a total of six seasons on the Road to Indy (2015-2020), he holds the record for the most top-five finishes across all series.

Thompson also participated in other open-wheel championship series. Driving for Exclusive Autosport, he was the Canadian Formula 1600 Super Series Champion in 2017.

=== Sports car racing ===
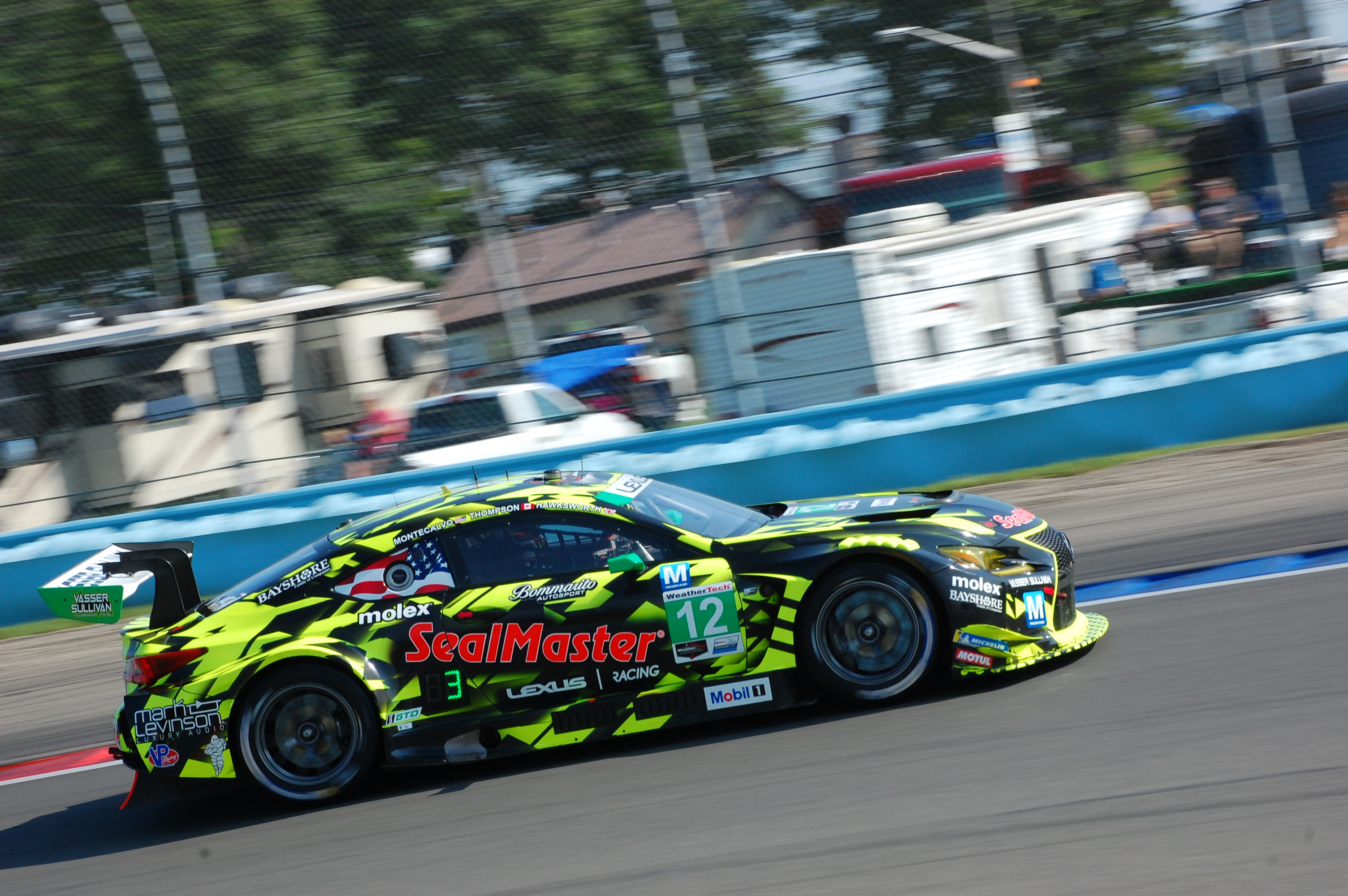
Thompson at Watkins Glen in 2025

In 2019 Thompson initiated a move into sports car racing, participating in the IMSA GT3 Cup Challenge in Canada and the United States, as well as the Canadian Touring Car Championship where he was the GTS class champion. 2021 and 2022 saw Thompson compete full time in the IMSA Porsche Carrera Cup North America as a pro-class entry with JDX Racing. After placing third in the 2021 season championship, Thompson earned the season's championship title in 2022.

In 2023, Thompson joined Vasser Sullivan Racing to pilot the #12 Lexus RC F GT3 in GTD class in the IMSA SportsCar Championship at all Michelin Endurance Cup events.

== Racing record ==
=== Career summary ===
Season	Series	Team	Races	Wins	Poles	F/Laps	Podiums	Points	Position
2015	U.S. F2000 National Championship	JDC Motorsports	16	0	0	0	0	221	5th
2015	U.S. F2000 Winterfest	JDC Motorsports	5	0	0	0	0	88	6th
2016	U.S. F2000 National Championship	Cape Motorsports; Wayne Taylor Racing	16	4	3	7	12	374	**2nd**
2017	U.S. F2000 National Championship	Exclusive Autosport	14	3	3	1	6	269	**3rd**
2017	Formula 1600 Super Series Canada	Exclusive Autosport	11	7	3	?	10	275	**1st**
2018	Pro Mazda Championship	Exclusive Autosport	16	3	3	5	6	345	**2nd**
2019	Indy Pro 2000 Championship	Abel Motorsports	16	2	3	1	8	344	**3rd**
2019	Porsche GT3 Cup Challenge USA	JDX Racing	4	1	1	1	4	184	NC
2019	Porsche GT3 Cup Challenge CAN	SCB Racing	12	0	2	0	6	343	**2nd**
2019	Canadian Touring Car Championship	Speedstar Motorsport	8	7	8	8	7	792	**1st**
2020	Indy Pro 2000 Championship	DEForce Racing	17	0	0	0	4	283	7th
2020	IMSA Prototype Challenge	Forty7 Motorsports	1	0	0	0	0	18	33rd
2021	Porsche Carrera Cup North America	JDX Racing	16	3	0	2	8	258	**3rd**
2022	Porsche Carrera Cup North America	JDX Racing	16	5	1	1	12	306	**1st**
2022	IMSA Prototype Challenge	Sean Creech Motorsport	2	0	0	2	1	550	19th
2023	GT4 America Series - Silver	TGR Hanley Motorsports	15	1	2	3	4	142	7th
2023	IMSA SportsCar Championship - GTD	Vasser Sullivan Racing	4	1	0	0	1	1138	21st
2023	Michelin Pilot Challenge - GS	TGR Hattori Motorsports	1	1	1	0	1	350	38th
2024	GT4 America Series - Silver	TGR Hanley Motorsports	7	0	1	0	2	49	5th
2024	IMSA SportsCar Championship - GTD	Vasser Sullivan	10	0	3	0	1	2527	6th
2024	IMSA SportsCar Championship - GTD Pro	Vasser Sullivan	1	0	0	0	0	301	34th
2024	Michelin Pilot Challenge - GS	TGR Team Hattori Motorsports	1	0	0	0	0	100	71st
2024	992 Endurance Cup	Mühlner Motorsport	1	0	0	0	0	N/A	21st
2024-25	Asian Le Mans Series - GT	2 Seas Motorsport	6	1	0	0	1	43	6th
2025	IMSA SportsCar Championship - GTD Pro	Vasser Sullivan Racing	1	0	0	0	0	300	27th
2025	IMSA SportsCar Championship - GTD	Vasser Sullivan Racing	10	0	3	0	5	2851	4th
2025	GT4 America Series - Pro-Am	TGR JTR Motorsports							
2025	Le Mans Cup - GT3	Racing Spirit of Léman	2	0	0	0	1	0	NC†
2025	GT World Challenge Europe Endurance Cup	2 Seas Motorsport	1	0	0	0	0	0	NC
2025-26	Asian Le Mans Series - GT	Team WRT	6	2	0	0	3	70	**2nd**
2025-26	24H Series Middle East - GT3	Team WRT							
2026	IMSA SportsCar Championship - LMP2	Bryan Herta Autosport with PR1/Mathiasen	5	0	0	0	0	1361	19th
2026	FIA World Endurance Championship - LMGT3	Team WRT	8	1	0	0	3	78	5th
2026	Intercontinental GT Challenge	Team WRT	1	0	0	0	0	6	27th
2026	Italian GT Championship Sprint Cup - GT3	BMW Italia Ceccato Racing	8	0	0	0	1	30	11th
2026	Nürburgring Langstrecken-Serie - BMW M240i	Adrenalin Motorsport Team Mainhattan Wheels							
2026	European Le Mans Series - LMGT3	Racing Spirit of Léman	1	0	1	0	0	1	34th
2026-27	Asian Le Mans Series - GT3	Team WRT							

^{*} Season still in progress.

=== American open-wheel racing results ===
==== U.S. F2000 National Championship ====
Year	Team	1	2	3	4	5	6	7	8	9	10	11	12	13	14	15	16	Rank	Points
2015	JDC Motorsports	STP; 15	STP; 6	NOL; 7	NOL; 4	BAR; 5	BAR; 5	IMS; 14	IMS; 6	LOR; 6	TOR; 11	TOR; 12	MOH; 5	MOH; 4	MOH; 5	LAG; 5	LAG; 14	**5th**	**221**
2016	Cape Motorsports Wayne Taylor Racing	STP; 15	STP; 4	BAR; 1	BAR; 1	IMS; 2	IMS; 1	LOR; 2	ROA; 5	ROA; 3	TOR; 3	TOR; 1	MOH; 17	MOH; 2	MOH; 2	LAG; 2	LAG; 3	**2nd**	**374**
2017	Exclusive Autosport	STP; 5	STP; 3	BAR; 5	BAR; 3	IMS; 19	IMS; 4	ROA; 5	ROA; 5	IOW; 12	TOR; 1	TOR; 1	MOH; 2	MOH; 1	WGI; 16			3rd	269

==== Indy Pro 2000 Championship ====
Year	Team	1	2	3	4	5	6	7	8	9	10	11	12	13	14	15	16	17	Rank	Points
2018	Exclusive Autosport	STP; 2	STP; 5	BAR; 1	BAR; 2	IMS; 5	IMS; 1	LOR; 1	ROA; 4	ROA; 4	TOR; 8	TOR; 8	MOH; 5	MOH; 6	GMP; 6	POR; 3	POR; 5		2nd	345
2019	Abel Motorsports	STP; 1	STP; 1	IMS; 5	IMS; 5	LOR; 10	ROA; 3	ROA; 3	TOR; 3	TOR; 2	MOH; 11	MOH; 4	GTW; 6	PIR; 3	PIR; 4	LAG; 4	LAG; 2		3rd	344
2020	DEForce Racing	ROA; 14	ROA; 16	MOH; 3	MOH; 4	MOH; 4	LOR; 10	GMP; 6	IMS; 3	IMS; 4	IMS; 5	MOH; 13	MOH; 2	NJM; 4	NJM; 2	NJM; 4	STP; 13	STP; 12	7th	283

=== Canadian regional racing results ===
==== Formula 1600 Super Series ====
Year	Team	1	2	3	4	5	6	7	8	9	10	11	Rank	Points
2017	Exclusive Autosport	CGV; 1	CGV; 1	CTMP; 3	CTMP; 1	CTMP; 1	CTR; 2	CTR; 3	CTR; 15	CMP; 1	CMP; 1	CMP; 1	1st	275

==== Canadian Touring Car Championship ====
Year	Team	1	2	3	4	5	6	7	8	9	10	Rank	Points
2019	Speedstar Motorsport	CTMP; 1	CTMP; 1	CMP; 1	CMP; 1	SMP; 1	SMP; 1	CTR; DNF	CTR; 1	CTMP	CTMP	1st	946

==== IMSA GT3 Cup Challenge Canada ====
Year	Team	1	2	3	4	5	6	7	8	9	10	11	12	Rank	Points
2019	SCB Racing	CTMP; 2	CTMP; 3	CGV; 2	CGV; 7	CTMP; 5	CTMP; 2	TOR; 3	TOR; 5	ROA; 6	ROA; 6	CMT; 4	CMT; 2	2nd	343

=== American sports car racing results ===
==== IMSA GT3 Cup Challenge America ====
Year	Team	1	2	3	4	5	6	7	8	9	10	11	12	13	14	15	16	Rank	Points
2019	JDX Racing	BAR; 3	BAR; 3	MOH; 1	MOH; 2	CGV; 2	CGV; 6	WGI	WGI	ROA	ROA	VIR	VIR	LAG	LAG	ATL	ATL	16th	184

==== IMSA Carrera Cup North America ====
Year	Team	1	2	3	4	5	6	7	8	9	10	11	12	13	14	15	16	Rank	Points
2021	JDX Racing	SEB; 4	SEB; 5	COTA; 1	COTA; 4	WGI; 7	WGI; 6	ROA; 2	ROA; 1	IMS; 2	IMS; 1	IMS; 9	VIR; 4	VIR; 3	ATL; 3	ATL; 3	ATL; 4	3rd	258
2022	JDX Racing	SEB; 3	SEB; 3	LBC; 2	LBC; 4	LAG; 1	LAG; 1	WGI; 3	WGI; 4	TOR; 6	TOR; 2	ROA; 1	ROA; 2	IMS; 1	IMS; 32	ATL; 1	ATL; 3	1st	306

==== IMSA SportsCar Championship ====
(key) (Races in bold indicate pole position) (Races in italics indicate fastest lap)

Year	Team	Class	Car	Engine	1	2	3	4	5	6	7	8	9	10	11	Pos.	Points
2023	Vasser Sullivan Racing	GTD	Lexus RC F GT3	Toyota 2UR 5.0 L V8	DAY; 5	SEB; 5	LBH	MON	WGL; 1	MOS	LIM	ELK	VIR	IMS	PET; 16	21st	1138
2024	VasserSullivan	GTD	Lexus RC F GT3	Toyota 2UR 5.0 L V8	**DAY**; 15	SEB; 13	**LBH**; 1	LGA; 9		**WGL**; 4	**MOS**; 5	ELK; 11	VIR; 9	IMS; 22	PET; 3	6th	2527
2024	VasserSullivan	GTD Pro	Lexus RC F GT3	Toyota 2UR 5.0 L V8					DET; 4							34th	301
2025	Vasser Sullivan Racing	GTD	Lexus RC F GT3	Toyota 2UR 5.0 L V8	DAY; 14	SEB; 2	**LBH**; 2	LGA; 2		WGL; 11	**MOS**; 3	ELK; 11	**VIR**; 9	IMS; 9	PET; 3	4th	2851
2025	Vasser Sullivan Racing	GTD Pro	Lexus RC F GT3	Toyota 2UR 5.0 L V8					DET; 9							27th	300
2026	Bryan Herta Autosport with PR1/Mathiasen	LMP2	Oreca 07	Gibson GK428 4.2 L V8	DAY; 6	SEB; 8	WGL; 6	MOS	ELK; 6	IMS	PET; 8					19th	1361

=== Complete Asian Le Mans Series results ===
(key) (Races in bold indicate pole position) (Races in italics indicate fastest lap)

Year	Team	Class	Car	1	2	3	4	5	6	Pos.	Points
2024–25	2 Seas Motorsport	GT	Mercedes-AMG GT3 Evo	SEP; 1; 8	SEP; 2; 8	DUB; 1; 1	DUB; 2; 6	ABU; 1 Ret	ABU; 2 Ret	6th	43
2025–26	Team WRT	GT	BMW M4 GT3 Evo	SEP; 1; 12	SEP; 2; 2	DUB; 1 Ret	DUB; 2; 1	ABU; 1; 1	ABU; 2; 10	2nd	70

=== Complete FIA World Endurance Championship results ===
(key) (Races in bold indicate pole position) (Races in italics indicate fastest lap)

Year	Entrant	Class	Chassis	Engine	1	2	3	4	5	6	7	8	Rank	Points
2026	Team WRT	LMGT3	BMW M4 GT3 Evo	BMW P58 3.0 L I6 t	IMO; 1	SPA; 11	LMS; Ret	SÃO; 2	COA; 11	FUJ; 6	CAT; 3	MNZ; 4	5th	78

=== Complete 24 Hours of Le Mans results ===
Year	Team	Co-Drivers	Car	Class	Laps	Pos.	Class Pos.
2026	(Belgium) Team WRT	(United Kingdom) Dan Harper (United States) Anthony McIntosh	BMW M4 GT3 Evo	LMGT3	291	DNF	DNF

=== Complete European Le Mans Series results ===
(key) (Races in bold indicate pole position; results in italics indicate fastest lap)

Year	Entrant	Class	Chassis	Engine	1	2	3	4	5	6	Rank	Points
2026	Racing Spirit of Léman	LMGT3	Aston Martin Vantage AMR GT3 Evo	Aston Martin M177 4.0 L Turbo V8	CAT	LEC	IMO	**SPA**; 12	SIL	ALG	34th	1
