= 2014 F1600 Championship Series =

2014 F1600 Championship season

Seasons
- ← 2013 2015 →

The 2014 F1600 Championship Series season was the fourth season of the F1600 Championship Series. The season commenced on April 12 at Road Atlanta, and ended on October 12 at Watkins Glen International after 14 races held at 7 meetings.

No fewer than eleven drivers won races during the season, but it was Norway's Ayla Ågren who won the title for Team Pelfrey. Ågren had trailed her team-mate Garth Rickards by nine points going into the final round, but her last-lap victory in the final race of the season; her third win of 2014 – passing Sam Chastain to do so – allowed her to take the championship title, ahead of Rickards by a total of thirteen points. Team Pelfrey swept the top three placings in the final championship standings, as Augie Lerch managed to surpass Jack Mitchell, Jr. by eleven points, again with results in the final race of the season. The only other driver to win multiple races during the season was James Goughary, who won races at the first Watkins Glen meeting as well as Road Atlanta, en route to finishing fifth overall in the championship and as the best placed Masters class driver. Rickards, Chastain, Lerch and Mitchell all won a race each, while other drivers to win were Franklin Futrelle at Road Atlanta, Mikhail Goikhberg at the first Watkins Glen meeting, Brandon Newey and Steve Bamford at Virginia International Raceway, as well as Evan Mehan at Thompson Speedway Motorsports Park.

== Drivers and teams ==
Team	No.	Driver	Car	Engine	Notes
Polestar Racing Group	0	(United States) Lewis Cooper III	Van Diemen	Ford Kent	Masters class; Road Atlanta & Mid-Ohio only
ONP Racing	2	(United States) Mike Scanlan	Spectrum	Honda Fit	Masters class
Auriana Racing	3	(United States) Joe Colasacco	Van Diemen RF05	Honda Fit	Masters class; Road Atlanta & Mid-Ohio only
Bjerke Motorsports	4	(United States) Ryan Bjerke	Van Diemen	Ford Kent	Thompson only
Dotworks Racing	06	(United States) Austin McCusker	Van Diemen VD01	Honda Fit	
Rice Race Prep.	07	(Canada) Steve Bamford	Mygale SJ11	Honda Fit	Masters class
Ski Motorsports	7	(United States) James Goughary	Van Diemen RF00	Honda Fit	Masters class
Raceworks	9	(United States) Brandon Angel	Spectrum	Honda Fit	
Raceworks	70	(United States) Sam Lockwood	Spectrum 014	Honda Fit	Watkins Glen 2 only
Raceworks	97	(United States) Franklin Futrelle	Spectrum 014	Honda Fit	
Swan Motorsports	10	(United States) Max Mällinen	Spectrum 014	Honda Fit	
WISKO Racing	13	(Russia) Nikita Lastochkin	Mygale SJ	Honda Fit	Road Atlanta only
WISKO Racing	13	(United States) Andrew Hobbs	Mygale SJ	Honda Fit	Watkins Glen 1 onwards
WISKO Racing	24	(United States) Will Harvey	Mygale SJ	Honda Fit	
Buffalo Motorsports	18	(United States) Dan Pyanowski	Van Diemen RF00	Honda Fit	Masters class; Watkins Glen & Mid-Ohio only
Art Foster Racing	21	(United States) Arthur Foster	Spectrum 014	Honda Fit	Masters class
Front Range MotorSports	23	(United States) Reid Hazelton	Van Diemen	Honda Fit	Watkins Glen 1 only
Front Range MotorSports	66	(United States) Bob Melvin	Van Diemen	Ford Kent	Masters class
Chastain Motorsports LLC	27	(United States) Sam Chastain	Mygale SJ13	Honda Fit	
Chastain Motorsports LLC	28	(United States) Andrew Lewis	Mygale	Honda Fit	Watkins Glen 2 only
Chastain Motorsports LLC	29	(United States) Evan Mehan	Mygale	Honda Fit	Skipped VIR
Chastain Motorsports LLC	29	(United States) Brandon Newey	Mygale	Honda Fit	VIR only
GRT Racing	31	(United States) Scott Rubenzer	Spectrum	Honda Fit	Masters class; skipped Watkins Glen & Pittsburgh
	36	(United States) Steve Roux	Wyvern	Honda Fit	Watkins Glen 1 & Thompson only
Kenneth Boquillion	45	(United States) Kenneth Boquillion	Mygale	Honda Fit	Masters class; Thompson only
505A Racing	46	(United States) Douglas Voss	Spectrum 012B	Honda Fit	Masters class
Trimark Racing	50	(United States) Keith Joslyn	Van Diemen RF98	Honda Fit	Masters class; Watkins Glen 1 only
Andrew Lewis	73	(United States) Andrew Lewis	Piper DF-3		Road Atlanta only
FF75	75	(United States) Donald Baggett	Swift DB6	Ford Kent	Masters class; skipped Watkins Glen & Pittsburgh
Team Pelfrey	80	(Colombia) Esteban Garzón	Mygale SJ12	Honda Fit	Road Atlanta only
Team Pelfrey	80	(Russia) Nikita Lastochkin	Mygale SJ12	Honda Fit	Watkins Glen 1 onwards
Team Pelfrey	81	(Norway) Ayla Ågren	Mygale SJ12	Honda Fit	
Team Pelfrey	82	(United States) Augie Lerch	Mygale SJ12	Honda Fit	
Team Pelfrey	83	(United States) Garth Rickards	Mygale SJ12	Honda Fit	
Drivers Services	88	(United States) Bill Valet	Swift DB6	Ford Kent	Watkins Glen 1 only
Exclusive Autosport	90	(Canada) Jayson Clunie	Spectrum 014	Honda Fit	Masters class; Road Atlanta only
Exclusive Autosport	91	(United States) Max Hanratty	Spectrum 014	Honda Fit	Road Atlanta only
Exclusive Autosport	92	(Canada) Jeff Kingsley	Spectrum 014	Honda Fit	Road Atlanta only
Exclusive Autosport	93	(United States) Jack Mitchell, Jr.	Spectrum 014	Honda Fit	
K-Hill Motorsports	98	(Russia) Mikhail Goikhberg	Mygale	Honda Fit	Watkins Glen 1 only
Dexter Czuba	99	(United States) Dexter Czuba	Van Diemen	Ford Kent	Thompson only

== Race calendar and results ==
Round	Circuit	Location	Date	Pole position	Fastest lap	Winning driver
1	Road Atlanta	(United States) Braselton, Georgia	April 12	(United States) Garth Rickards	(Canada) Steve Bamford	(United States) Franklin Futrelle
2	Road Atlanta	(United States) Braselton, Georgia	April 13	(United States) James Goughary	(United States) James Goughary	(United States) James Goughary
3	Watkins Glen International	(United States) Watkins Glen, New York	May 17	(United States) James Goughary	(United States) Augie Lerch	(United States) James Goughary
4	Watkins Glen International	(United States) Watkins Glen, New York	May 18	(United States) Garth Rickards	(United States) Garth Rickards	(Russia) Mikhail Goikhberg
5	Virginia International Raceway	(United States) Alton, Virginia	June 7	(United States) Brandon Newey	(Norway) Ayla Ågren	(United States) Brandon Newey
6	Virginia International Raceway	(United States) Alton, Virginia	June 8	(United States) Brandon Newey	(Norway) Ayla Ågren	(Canada) Steve Bamford
7	Mid-Ohio Sports Car Course	(United States) Lexington, Ohio	July 5	(United States) Garth Rickards	(United States) Garth Rickards	(Norway) Ayla Ågren
8	Mid-Ohio Sports Car Course	(United States) Lexington, Ohio	July 6	(United States) Sam Chastain	(Norway) Ayla Ågren	(United States) Augie Lerch
9	Pittsburgh International Race Complex	(United States) Wampum, Pennsylvania	August 2	(United States) Jack Mitchell, Jr.	(United States) Garth Rickards	(Norway) Ayla Ågren
10	Pittsburgh International Race Complex	(United States) Wampum, Pennsylvania	August 3	(United States) Jack Mitchell, Jr.	(United States) Evan Mehan	(United States) Jack Mitchell, Jr.
11	Thompson Speedway Road Course	(United States) Thompson, Connecticut	August 30	(United States) Evan Mehan	(United States) Evan Mehan	(United States) Evan Mehan
12	Thompson Speedway Road Course	(United States) Thompson, Connecticut	August 31	(United States) Evan Mehan	(Norway) Ayla Ågren	(United States) Sam Chastain
13	Watkins Glen International	(United States) Watkins Glen, New York	October 11	(Russia) Nikita Lastochkin	(United States) Garth Rickards	(United States) Garth Rickards
14	Watkins Glen International	(United States) Watkins Glen, New York	October 12	(Norway) Ayla Ågren	(United States) Augie Lerch	(Norway) Ayla Ågren

== Final points standings ==
Place	Driver	Starts	Points
1	(Norway) Ayla Ågren	12	492
2	(United States) Garth Rickards	12	479
3	(United States) Augie Lerch	12	413
4	(United States) Jack Mitchell, Jr.	12	408
5	(United States) James Goughary (M)	12	381
6	(Russia) Nikita Lastochkin	12	360
7	(United States) Sam Chastain	12	358
8	(Canada) Steve Bamford (M)	12	326
9	(United States) Arthur Foster (M)	12	300
10	(United States) Will Harvey	12	264
11	(United States) Andrew Hobbs	10	226
12	(United States) Mike Scanlan (M)	12	160
13	(United States) Evan Mehan	6	155
14	(United States) Austin McCusker	10	109
15	(United States) Brandon Angel	6	98
15	(United States) Brandon Newey	2	98
17	(United States) Douglas Voss	8	97
18	(United States) Scott Rubenzer (M)	6	88
19	(Russia) Mikhail Goikhberg	2	77
20	(United States) Lewis Cooper III (M)	4	72
20	(United States) Joe Colasacco (M)	4	72
22	(United States) Franklin Futrelle	5	66
23	(United States) Max Mallinen	6	61
24	(United States) Bob Melvin	6	44
25	(Canada) Jayson Clunie	2	36
25	(United States) Reid Hazleton	2	36
27	(Colombia) Esteban Garzón	2	34
27	(United States) Andrew Lewis	2	34
29	(United States) Donald Baggett	4	29
29	(United States) Steve Roux (M)	3	29
31	(United States) Bill Valet	2	28
32	(United States) Sam Lockwood (M)	2	26
33	(Canada) Jeff Kingsley	2	24
34	(United States) Ryan Bjerke	2	18
34	(United States) Dexter Czuba	2	18
36	(United States) Keith Joslyn	2	17
37	(United States) Max Hanratty	2	14
38	(United States) Dan Pyanowski	2	11

- (M) Indicates Masters class driver
