= Augie Lerch =

American racing driver

- Nationality: American
- Born: December 5, 1996 (age 29)

Previous series
- 2015 2015 2015–2016 2014: U.S. F2000 National Championship; USF2000 Winterfest; Stadium Super Trucks; F1600 Championship Series

Augie Lerch (born December 5, 1996) is an American racing driver residing in Tucson, Arizona.

Lerch grew up kart racing, starting at the age of seven. By pushing through the ranks he landed in 3rd place in the S2 Championship class in the SKUSA SuperNationals by 2013. The following year, he competed in Rok Cup International at South Garda. That same year, he and Team Pelfrey partnered up in the F1600 Championship Series for his first run in open wheel racing. He placed third overall in the championship, winning one event at Mid-Ohio Sports Car Course and taking two more podiums in Watkins Glen International.

For 2015, Lerch entered the Mazda Road to Indy in the U.S. F2000 National Championship with JAY Motorsports. Reaching mid-season and still with little progress developing the car, Lerch brought on Engineer, Daryl Bear, a force that helped bring RC Enerson to success in 2014. Despite the improvements that were made during this time, Lerch felt that the short time left on the schedule will not allow for enough gain in the Championship.

In September 2015, Lerch made his Stadium Super Trucks debut in the Sand Sports Super Show at the OC Fair & Event Center in Costa Mesa, California. Running three races, he recorded a best finish of third. Later in the year, he began racing in Global Rallycross Lites. The following year, he returned to SST at the Grand Prix of St. Petersburg.

== Motorsports career results ==
=== F1600 Championship Series ===
| Year | Team | 1 | 2 | 3 | 4 | 5 | 6 | 7 | 8 | 9 | 10 | 11 | 12 | 13 | 14 | Rank | Points |
|---|---|---|---|---|---|---|---|---|---|---|---|---|---|---|---|---|---|
| 2014 | Team Pelfrey | ATL; 7 | ATL; 6 | WAT; 5 | WAT; 4 | VIR; 4 | VIR; 6 | MOH; 4 | MOH; 1 | PIT; 3 | PIT; 10 | TSMP; 5 | TSMP; 7 | WAT; 2 | WAT; 3 | **3rd** | **419** |

=== U.S. F2000 Winterfest ===
| Year | Team | 1 | 2 | 3 | 4 | 5 | Rank | Points |
|---|---|---|---|---|---|---|---|---|
| 2015 | JAY Motorsports | NOL; 14 | NOL; 15 | NOL; 14 | BAR; 8 | BAR; 10 | **13th** | **55** |

=== U.S. F2000 National Championship ===
| Year | Team | 1 | 2 | 3 | 4 | 5 | 6 | 7 | 8 | 9 | 10 | 11 | 12 | 13 | 14 | 15 | 16 | Rank | Points |
|---|---|---|---|---|---|---|---|---|---|---|---|---|---|---|---|---|---|---|---|
| 2015 | JAY Motorsports | STP; 13 | STP; DNS | NOL; 13 | NOL; 10 | BAR; 12 | BAR; 12 | IMS; 10 | IMS; 16 | LOR; 13 | TOR | TOR | MOH | MOH | MOH | LAG | LAG | **15th** | **69** |

=== Stadium Super Trucks ===
(key) (Bold – Pole position. Italics – Fastest qualifier. * – Most laps led.)

Stadium Super Trucks results
| Year | 1 | 2 | 3 | 4 | 5 | 6 | 7 | 8 | 9 | 10 | 11 | 12 | 13 | 14 | 15 | 16 | 17 | 18 | 19 | 20 | 21 | 22 | SSTC | Pts | Ref |
|---|---|---|---|---|---|---|---|---|---|---|---|---|---|---|---|---|---|---|---|---|---|---|---|---|---|
| 2015 | ADE | ADE | ADE | STP | STP | LBH | DET | DET | DET | AUS | TOR | TOR | OCF; 3 | OCF; 6 | **OCF**; 6 | SRF | SRF | SRF | SRF | SYD | LVV | LVV | 14th | 71 | |
| 2016 | ADE | ADE | ADE | STP; 7 | STP; 10 | LBH | LBH | DET | DET | DET | TOW | TOW | TOW | TOR | TOR | CLT | CLT | OCF | OCF | SRF | SRF | SRF | 29th | 25 | |
