= Nico Jamin =

French racing driver

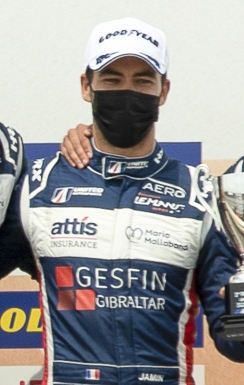
- Nationality: (France) French
- Born: Nicolas Jamin; December 5, 1995 (age 30) Rouen, France
- Categorisation: FIA Silver (until 2017); FIA Gold (2018–)

Championship titles
- 2015: USF2000 Championship

Nicolas Jamin (born December 5, 1995) is a French racing driver who currently competes in the European Le Mans Series with United Autosports.

== Open Wheel Racing ==
=== F2000 ===
Jamin made his professional debut in the 2014 U.S. F2000 National Championship with Belardi Auto Racing and Pabst Racing Services. He returned in 2015 in the U.S. F2000 National Championship with Cape Motorsports Wayne Taylor Racing. He then won ten of the fifteen races in the 2015 season on his way to the title. He finished on the podium in every race except one, earning an automatic promotion to the Pro Mazda Championship in 2016.

=== Pro Mazda ===
Jamin scored two wins and six podiums in his debut season in the Pro Mazda Championship, finishing third in the standings. After being scouted by Andretti Autosport during an end of season test, he was signed to drive in the Indy Lights championship for them in 2017.

=== Indy Lights ===
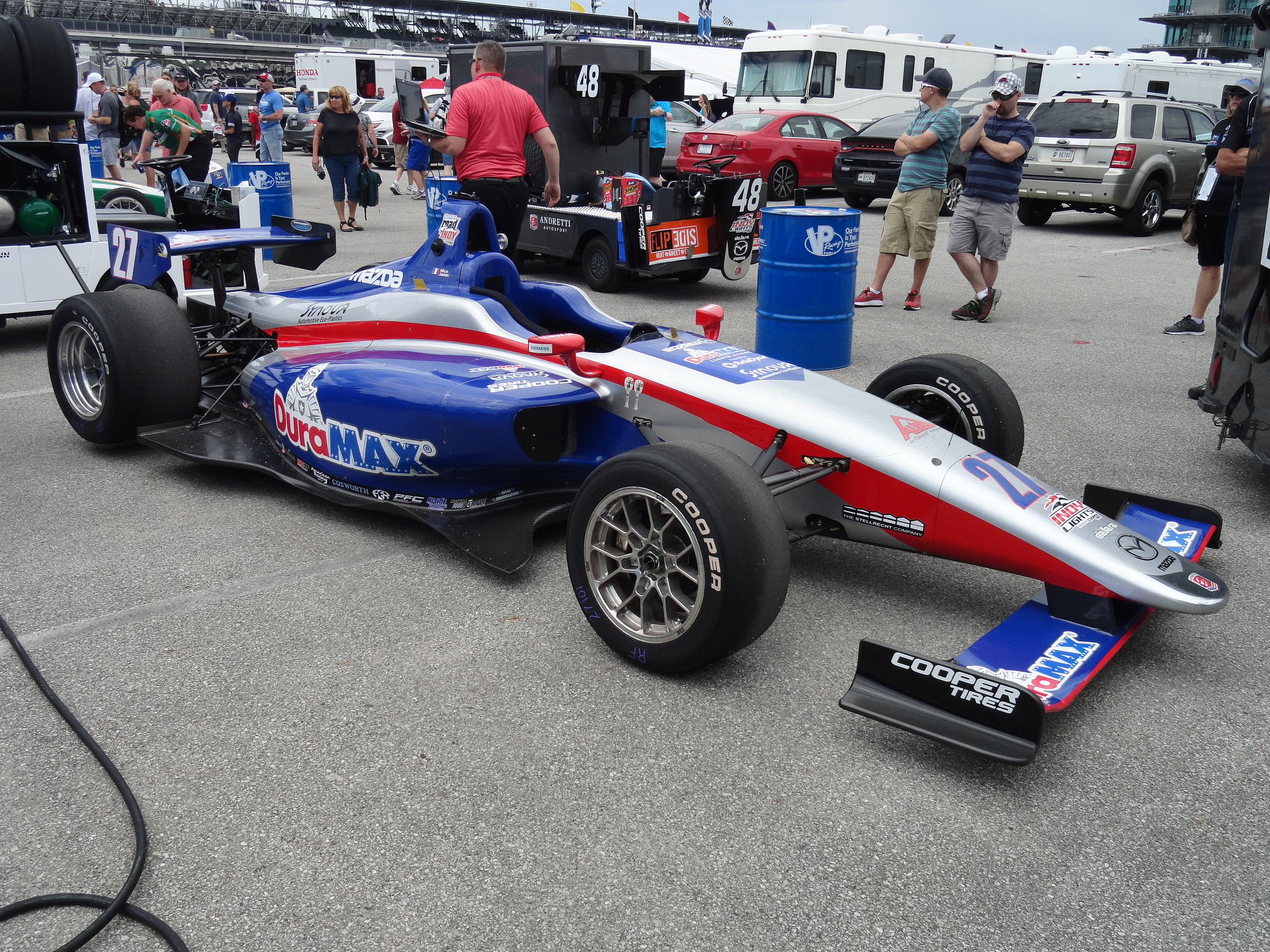
2017 Indy Lights car of Nico Jamin at the Freedom 100

Jamin joined Andretti Autosport for the 2017 Indy Lights season and recorded his first win in April at Barber Motorsports Park.

=== Sports Car Racing ===
Jamin joined ANSA Motorsports in 2017 for his first LMP3 experience in the IMSA Prototype Challenge series (formerly IMSA Lites), where he won both races of his debut weekend at Sebring International Raceway.

Jamin made his first-ever Pirelli World Challenge start in 2017 at Virginia International Raceway where he swept the weekend, winning both races in the GTS class, driving a KTM X-Bow GT4 for ANSA Motorsports. After previously appearing for AKKA ASP Team in the GT World Challenge Europe in 2018, Jamin returned to the series in 2023, taking part in a Bronze Cup entry for AGS Events alongside Antonin Borga and Leonardo Gorini.

== Racing record ==
=== Career summary ===
Season	Series	Team	Races	Wins	Poles	F/Laps	Podiums	Points	Position
2012	French F4 Championship	Auto Sport Academy	14	0	0	0	4	102	7th
2013	Formula Renault 2.0 Northern European Cup	ART Junior Team	16	0	0	0	1	144	7th
2013	Eurocup Formula Renault 2.0	ART Junior Team	2	0	0	0	0	0	NC†
2013	Formula Renault 2.0 Alps Series	AV Formula	0	0	0	0	0	0	NC
2014	U.S. F2000 National Championship	Belardi Auto Racing	7	0	0	0	1	154	9th
2014	U.S. F2000 National Championship	Pabst Racing Services	7	0	0	0	0	154	9th
2014	U.S. F2000 Winterfest	Belardi Auto Racing	6	0	0	0	0	46	13th
2015	U.S. F2000 National Championship	Cape Motorsports with WTR	16	10	7	9	15	457	**1st**
2015	U.S. F2000 Winterfest	Cape Motorsports with WTR	5	1	0	0	4	136	**1st**
2015	Cooper Tires Prototype Lites - L1	ANSA Motorsports	2	0	0	0	1	16	23rd
2015	V de V Challenge Endurance Proto - Scratch	CD Sport	1	0	0	0	0	0	NC
2016	Pro Mazda Championship	Cape Motorsports with WTR	16	2	1	2	6	331	**3rd**
2017	Indy Lights	Andretti Autosport	16	3	1	1	5	269	7th
2017	IMSA Prototype Challenge - LMP3	ANSA Motorsports	2	2	2	2	2	42	9th
2017	Pirelli World Challenge - GTS	ANSA Motorsports	2	2	1	2	2	51	23rd
2018	Blancpain GT Series Endurance Cup	AKKA ASP Team	5	0	0	0	0	0	NC
2018	Blancpain GT Series Sprint Cup	AKKA ASP Team	10	0	1	0	1	45	6th
2018	European Le Mans Series - LMP2	Duqueine Engineering	6	0	1	0	1	34	11th
2019	European Le Mans Series - LMP2	Duqueine Engineering	6	0	0	0	1	45	9th
2019	24 Hours of Le Mans - LMP2	Duqueine Engineering	1	0	0	0	0	N/A	7th
2020	European Le Mans Series - LMP2	Panis Racing	5	0	0	0	1	47	4th
2020	24 Hours of Le Mans - LMP2	Panis Racing	1	0	0	0	1	N/A	**3rd**
2021	European Le Mans Series - LMP2	United Autosports	5	0	0	0	1	28.5	12th
2021	24 Hours of Le Mans - LMP2	United Autosports	1	0	0	0	0	N/A	DNF
2021	Lamborghini Super Trofeo North America - Pro	ANSA Motorsports	2	0	1	0	0	9	13th
2022	European Le Mans Series - LMP2	Panis Racing	6	0	1	0	4	94	**2nd**
2022	24 Hours of Le Mans - LMP2	Panis Racing	1	0	0	0	0	N/A	12th
2023	GT World Challenge Europe Endurance Cup	AGS Events	4	0	0	0	0	0	NC
2023	Lamborghini Super Trofeo North America - Pro	ANSA Motorsports	12	0	0	0	3	96	4th
2024	Lamborghini Super Trofeo North America - Pro	ANSA Motorsports							
2026	Lamborghini Super Trofeo North America - Pro	ANSA Motorsports	2	0	0	0	2	22	17th

† As he was a guest driver, Jamin was ineligible to score points.

=== Complete French F4 Championship results ===
(key) (Races in bold indicate pole position; races in italics indicate fastest lap)

Year	1	2	3	4	5	6	7	8	9	10	11	12	13	14	DC	Points
2012	LÉD; 1; 8	LÉD; 2; 15	PAU; 1; 10	PAU; 2; 6	VDV; 1; 6	VDV; 2; 12	MAG; 1; 7	MAG; 2; 5	NAV; 1; 3	NAV; 2; 3	LMS; 1; 9	LMS; 2 Ret	LEC; 1; 3	LEC; 2; 2	7th	102

=== Complete Eurocup Formula Renault 2.0 results ===
(key) (Races in bold indicate pole position; races in italics indicate fastest lap)

Year	Entrant	1	2	3	4	5	6	7	8	9	10	11	12	13	14	DC	Points
2013	ART Junior Team	ALC; 1	ALC; 2	SPA; 1	SPA; 2	MSC; 1	MSC; 2	RBR; 1	RBR; 2	HUN; 1	HUN; 2	LEC; 1; 21	LEC; 2; 18	CAT; 1	CAT; 2	NC†	0

† As Jamin was a guest driver, he was ineligible for points

=== Complete Formula Renault 2.0 NEC results ===
(key) (Races in bold indicate pole position) (Races in italics indicate fastest lap)

Year	Entrant	1	2	3	4	5	6	7	8	9	10	11	12	13	14	15	16	17	DC	Points
2013	ART Junior Team	HOC; 1; 31	HOC; 2 Ret	HOC; 3; 28	NÜR; 1; 21	NÜR; 2; 17	SIL; 1; 4	SIL; 2; 3	SPA; 1; 7	SPA; 2; 10	ASS; 1; 7	ASS; 2; 10	MST; 1; 11	MST; 2; 12	MST; 3; 7	ZAN; 1; 15	ZAN; 2; 7	ZAN; 3 C	7th	144

=== American open-wheel racing results ===
==== U.S. F2000 National Championship ====
Year	Team	1	2	3	4	5	6	7	8	9	10	11	12	13	14	15	16	Rank	Points
2014	Belardi Auto Racing	STP; 3	STP; 14	BAR; 6	BAR; 10	IMS; 9	IMS; 19	LOR; 10										**9th**	**154**
2014	Pabst Racing Services								TOR; 20	TOR; 6	MOH; 11	MOH; 5	MOH; 9	SNM; 9	SNM; 8			**9th**	**154**
2015	Cape Motorsports with Wayne Taylor Racing	STP; 3	STP; 3	**NOL**; 1	NOL; 2	**BAR**; 14	BAR; 1	**IMS**; 1	IMS; 1	**LOR**; 2	**TOR**; 2	TOR; 1	**MOH**; 1	MOH; 1	MOH; 1	**LAG**; 1	LAG; 1	1st	457

==== Pro Mazda Championship ====
Year	Team	1	2	3	4	5	6	7	8	9	10	11	12	13	14	15	16	Rank	Points
2016	Cape Motorsports with Wayne Taylor Racing	STP; 4	STP; 4	ALA; 6	ALA; 4	IMS; 5	IMS; 4	LOR; 7	ROA; 10	ROA; 2	TOR; 2	TOR; 3	**MOH**; 1	MOH; 1	LAG; 4	LAG; 3	LAG; 4	**3rd**	**331**

==== Indy Lights ====
Year	Team	1	2	3	4	5	6	7	8	9	10	11	12	13	14	15	16	Rank	Points
2017	Andretti Autosport	STP; 7	STP; 14	ALA; 1	ALA; 3	**IMS**; 1	IMS; 4	INDY; 10	ROA; 6	ROA; 14	IOW; 7	TOR; 14	TOR; 12	MOH; 3	MOH; 1	GMP; 11	WGL; 5	7th	269

=== Complete Blancpain GT Series Sprint Cup results ===
Year	Team	Car	Class	1	2	3	4	5	6	7	8	9	10	Pos.	Points
2018	AKKA ASP Team	Mercedes-AMG GT3	Pro	ZOL; 1; 9	ZOL; 2; 4	BRH; 1; 5	BRH; 2; 6					NÜR; 1; 7	NÜR; 2; 6	6th	45
2018	AKKA ASP Team	Mercedes-AMG GT3	Silver					**MIS**; **1** Ret	MIS; 2; 5	HUN; 1; 3	HUN; 2; 8			4th	50.5

=== Complete European Le Mans Series results ===
Year	Entrant	Class	Chassis	Engine	1	2	3	4	5	6	Rank	Points
2018	Duqueine Engineering	LMP2	Oreca 07	Gibson GK428 4.2 L V8	LEC; 3	MNZ; 6	RBR; DSQ	SIL; 7	SPA; 5‡	**ALG**; Ret	11th	35
2019	Duqueine Engineering	LMP2	Oreca 07	Gibson GK428 4.2 L V8	LEC; 3	MNZ; 6	CAT; 4	SIL; Ret	SPA; 5	ALG; Ret	9th	45
2020	Panis Racing	LMP2	Oreca 07	Gibson GK428 4.2 L V8	LEC; Ret	SPA; 3	LEC; 4	MNZ; 5	ALG; 5		4th	47
2021	United Autosports	LMP2	Oreca 07	Gibson GK428 4.2 L V8	CAT; 9	RBR; 16	LEC; 3	MNZ; WD	SPA; 5	ALG; 10	12th	28.5
2022	Panis Racing	LMP2	Oreca 07	Gibson GK428 4.2 L V8	LEC; 3	IMO; 4	MNZ; 2	**CAT**; 2	SPA; 4	ALG; 2	2nd	94

^{‡} Half points awarded as less than 75% of race distance was completed.

=== Complete FIA World Endurance Championship results ===
(key) (Races in bold indicate pole position; races in italics indicate fastest lap)

Year	Entrant	Class	Chassis	Engine	1	2	3	4	5	6	7	8	Rank	Points
2018-19	Duqueine Engineering	LMP2	Oreca 07	Gibson GK428 4.2 L V8	SPA	LMS	SIL	FUJ	SHA	SEB	SPA	LMS; 7	NC	0
2019-20	Panis Racing	LMP2	Oreca 07	Gibson GK428 4.2 L V8	SIL	FUJ	SHA	BHR	COA	SPA	LMS; 3	BHR	NC	0
2021	United Autosports	LMP2	Oreca 07	Gibson GK428 4.2 L V8	SPA	ALG	MNZ	LMS; Ret	BHR	BHR			NC	0
2022	Panis Racing	LMP2	Oreca 07	Gibson GK428 4.2 L V8	SEB	SPA	LMS; 12	MNZ	FUJ	BHR			-*	-*

=== Complete 24 Hours of Le Mans results ===
Year	Team	Co-Drivers	Car	Class	Laps	Pos.	Class Pos.
2019	(France) Duqueine Engineering	(France) Romain Dumas (France) Pierre Ragues	Oreca 07-Gibson	LMP2	363	12th	7th
2020	(France) Panis Racing	(France) Julien Canal (France) Matthieu Vaxivière	Oreca 07-Gibson	LMP2	368	7th	**3rd**
2021	(United Kingdom) United Autosports	(South Africa) Jonathan Aberdein (Venezuela) Manuel Maldonado	Oreca 07-Gibson	LMP2	75	DNF	DNF
2022	(France) Panis Racing	(France) Julien Canal (Netherlands) Job van Uitert	Oreca 07-Gibson	LMP2	366	16th	12th

Sporting positions
Preceded by R. C. Enerson	U.S. F2000 Winterfest; Champion; 2015	Succeeded by Incumbent
Preceded by Florian Latorre	U.S. F2000 National Championship; Champion; 2015	Succeeded by Anthony Martin
