= 2016 SportsCar Grand Prix =

Seventh round of the 2016 IMSA SportsCar Championship season

Canadian Tire Motorsport Park

The 2016 Mobil 1 SportsCar Grand Prix was a sports car race sanctioned by the International Motor Sports Association (IMSA) held at Canadian Tire Motorsport Park near Bowmanville, Ontario on July 10, 2016. The race was the seventh round of the 2016 WeatherTech SportsCar Championship and the event marked the 31st IMSA sanctioned sports car race held at the facility.

== Background ==
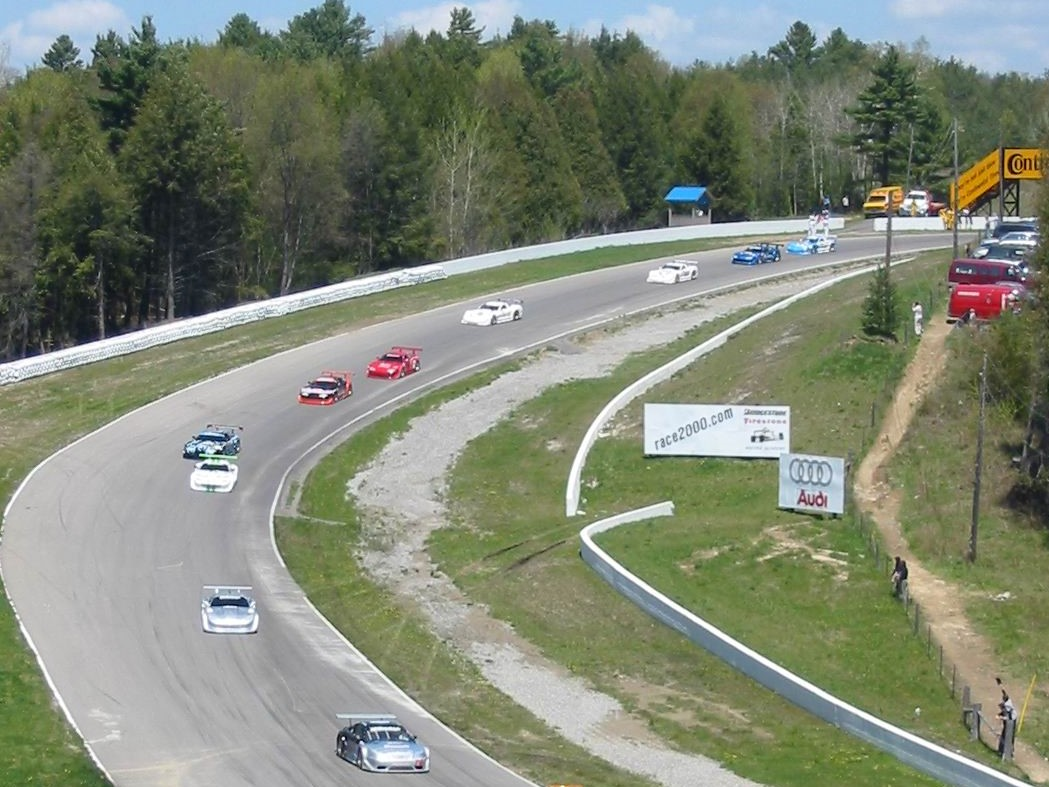
Canadian Tire Motorsports Park, where the race was held.

International Motor Sports Association (IMSA) president Scott Atherton confirmed the race was part of the schedule for the 2016 IMSA SportsCar Championship (IMSA SCC) in August 2015. It was the third consecutive year the event was held as part of the WeatherTech SportsCar Championship, thirty-fifth annual running of the race. The 1 Mobil 1 SportsCar Grand Prix was the second of seventh scheduled automobile endurance races of 2016 by IMSA, and was the fourth round not held on the held as part of the North American Endurance Cup. The race was held at the ten-turn 2.459 mi (3.957 km) Canadian Tire Motorsports Park in Bowmanville, Ontario, Canada on July 10, 2016. For 2016, the WeatherTech Championship race featured all four classes, Prototype (P), Prototype Challenge (PC), GT Le Mans (GTLM) and the GT Daytona (GTD) for the first time since the 2013 edition of the Grand Prix. The weekend also included races for the Continental Tire SportsCar Challenge, Mazda Prototype Lites, the Global MX-5 Cup and the Nissan Micra Cup.

Before the race, João Barbosa and Christian Fittipaldi led the Prototype Drivers' Championship with 187 points, ahead of Jordan Taylor and Ricky Taylor in second by 7 points, and Eric Curran and Dane Cameron in third 180 points. With 198 points, PC was led by Alex Popow and Renger van der Zande over Robert Alon and Tom Kimber-Smith by 3 points. In GTLM, Oliver Gavin and Tommy Milner led the Drivers' Championship with 159 points, 8 points ahead of Ryan Briscoe and Richard Westbrook. In GTD, the Drivers' Championship was led by Alessandro Balzan and Christina Nielsen with 162 points; the duo held a thirteen-point advantage over Mario Farnbacher and Alex Riberas. Chevrolet and Ferrari were leading their respective Manufacturers' Championships, while Wayne Taylor Racing, Starworks Motorsport, Corvette Racing, and Scuderia Corsa each led their own Teams' Championships.

== Practice ==
There were three practice sessions preceding the start of the race on Sunday: two on Friday and one on Saturday. The first two one-hour sessions were on Friday morning and afternoon while the third session on Saturday morning lasted one hour.

The first practice session was held in damp weather. Jordan Taylor set the fastest lap in the No. 10 WTR Corvette DP at 1 minute, 11.158 seconds, 0.985 seconds faster than Tristan Nunez's No. 55 Mazda. Ryan Dalziel in VFR's No. 90 vehicle was third, and Oswaldo Negri Jr.'s No. 60 MSR ligier was fourth. The seven-vehicle PC class was led by PR1/Mathiasen Motorsports's No. 52 car, driven by Tom Kimber-Smith with a time of 1 minute, 13.154 seconds. The two Corvette Racing team cars of Oliver Gavin (No. 4) and Antonio García (No. 3) led GTLM. Andy Lally's No. 44 Magnus Audi R8 recorded the fastest time in GTD.

Rain continued to affect the track in the second practice session. Jordan Taylor was fastest with a time of 1 minute, 11.206 seconds, followed by the AER cars of Fittipaldi and Cameron in second and third. A 1:12.131 lap saw Renger van der Zande's No. 8 Starworks vehicle lead PC. Bill Auberlen led GTLM in the No. 25 BMW with a 1-minute, 15.961 lap. Tommy Milner's No. 4 Corvette was second. Müller in the No. 66 CGR Ford GT was third in GTLM. Lally's No. 44 Magnus Audi R8 led GTD, and Spencer Pumpelly, in the No.16 Change Racing Lamborghini, was second in class.

The final practice was held on a dry race track which allowed for faster lap times. Negri's MSR Ligier set the fastest overall lap of 1:10.522, 0.002 seconds faster than Bomarito's No. 55 Mazda. van der Zande led the PC class with a 1 minute, 11.884 second lap in Starworks' No. 8 car. Corvette Racing paced GTLM with García's No. 3 car lapping 1:15.233, ahead of the two BMW M6 GTLMs. With a 1:17.888 lap, David led the GTD class in the No. 6 Stevenson Audi R8.

== Qualifying ==
In Saturday afternoon's 90-minute four-group qualifying, each category had separate 15-minute sessions. Regulations stipulated that teams nominate one qualifying driver, with the fastest laps determining each class' starting order. IMSA arranged the grid to put Prototypes ahead of the PC, GTLM and GTD cars.

=== Qualifying results ===
Pole positions in each class are indicated in bold and by ‡. P stands for Prototype, PC (Prototype Challenge), GTLM (Grand Touring Le Mans) and GTD (Grand Touring Daytona).

Pos.	Class	No.	Team	Driver	Time	Gap	Grid
1	**P**	**55**	**(Japan) Mazda Motorsports**	**(United States) Tristan Nunez**	**1:10.126**	**_**	1 ‡
2	P	10	(United States) Wayne Taylor Racing	(United States) Ricky Taylor	1:10.435	+0.309	2
3	P	70	(Japan) Mazda Motorsports	(United States) Tom Long	1:10.572	+0.446	3
4	P	5	(United States) Action Express Racing	(Brazil) Christian Fittipaldi	1:10.761	+0.635	4
5	P	31	(United States) Action Express Racing	(United States) Eric Curran	1:11.177	+1.051	5
6	P	90	(United States) VisitFlorida Racing	(Belgium) Marc Goossens	1:11.296	+1.170	6
7	P	60	(United States) Michael Shank Racing with Curb-Agajanian	(United States) John Pew	1:11.760	+1.634	7
8	PC	54	(United States) CORE Autosport	(United States) Colin Braun	1:11.946	+1.820	15^{1}
9	**PC**	**38**	**(United States) Performance Tech Motorsports**	**(United States) James French**	**1:12.372**	**+2.246**	8‡
10	PC	85	(United States) JDC-Miller MotorSports	(South Africa) Stephen Simpson	1:12.448	+2.322	9
11	PC	20	(United States) BAR1 Motorsports	(United States) Matt McMurry	1:12.471	+2.345	10
12	PC	52	(United States) PR1/Mathiasen Motorsports	(United States) Robert Alon	1:12.505	+2.379	111
13	PC	8	(United States) Starworks Motorsport	(Venezuela) Alex Popow	1:13.197	+3.071	12
14	P	0	(United States) Panoz DeltaWing Racing	(United Kingdom) Katherine Legge	1:14.077	+3.951	13
15	PC	88	(United States) Starworks Motorsport	(United States) Mark Kvamme	1:15.020	+4.894	14
16	**GTLM**	**3**	**(United States) Corvette Racing**	**(Spain) Antonio García**	**1:15.198**	**+5.072**	16‡
17	GTLM	66	(United States) Ford Chip Ganassi Racing	(Germany) Dirk Müller	1:15.236	+5.110	17
18	GTLM	67	(United States) Ford Chip Ganassi Racing	(United Kingdom) Richard Westbrook	1:15.430	+5.304	18
19	GTLM	100	(United States) BMW Team RLL	(Germany) Lucas Luhr	1:15.446	+5.320	19
20	GTLM	25	(United States) BMW Team RLL	(United States) Bill Auberlen	1:15.501	+5.375	20
21	GTLM	4	(United States) Corvette Racing	(United Kingdom) Oliver Gavin	1:15.549	+5.423	21
22	GTLM	62	(United States) Risi Competizione	(Italy) Giancarlo Fisichella	1:15.780	+5.654	22
23	GTLM	912	(United States) Porsche North America	(New Zealand) Earl Bamber	1:16.230	+6.104	23
24	GTLM	911	(United States) Porsche North America	(United Kingdom) Nick Tandy	1:16.476	+6.350	24
25	**GTD**	**23**	**(United States) Team Seattle/Alex Job Racing**	**(Spain) Alex Riberas**	**1:18.245**	**+8.119**	25‡
26	GTD	6	(United States) Stevenson Motorsports	(United States) Andrew Davis	1:18.582	+8.456	26
27	GTD	16	(United States) Change Racing	(United States) Spencer Pumpelly	1:18.672	+8.546	27
28	GTD	96	(United States) Turner Motorsport	(United States) Bret Curtis	1:18.673	+8.547	28
29	GTD	73	(United States) Park Place Motorsports	(United States) Patrick Lindsey	1:18.745	+8.619	29
30	GTD	9	(United States) Stevenson Motorsports	(United States) Matt Bell	1:18.832	+8.706	30
31	GTD	27	(United States) Dream Racing	(Monaco) Cédric Sbirrazzuoli	1:19.000	+8.874	31
32	GTD	33	(United States) Riley Motorsports	(United States) Ben Keating	1:19.132	+9.006	32
33	GTD	48	(United States) Paul Miller Racing	(United States) Madison Snow	1:19.151	+9.025	33
34	GTD	63	(United States) Scuderia Corsa	(Denmark) Christina Nielsen	1:19.332	+9.206	34
35	GTD	97	(United States) Turner Motorsport	(United States) Michael Marsal	1:20.070	+9.944	35
36	GTD	44	(United States) Magnus Racing	(United States) John Potter	1:20.197	+10.071	36^{2}
37	GTD	22	(United States) Alex Job Racing	(United States) Cooper MacNeil	1:20.269	+10.143	37
Sources:

- ^{1} The No. 54 CORE Autosport entry was moved to the back of the PC field as per Article 43.1 of the Sporting regulations (Change of starting driver).
- ^{2} The No. 44 Magnus Racing entry was moved to the back of the GTD field as per Article 40.1.5 of the Sporting regulations (Change of starting tires).

== Report ==
=== Race summary ===
The race was won overall by Eric Curran and Dane Cameron, driving a Chevrolet Corvette DP for Action Express Racing. They finished ahead of the Action Express Racing sister car of João Barbosa and Christian Fittipaldi, while the podium was completed by Ricky and Jordan Taylor of Wayne Taylor Racing. In sixth place overall, CORE Autosport won the Prototype Challenge class with drivers Jon Bennett and Colin Braun, while the GT Le Mans honors were taken by Ford Chip Ganassi Racing drivers Ryan Briscoe and Richard Westbrook in the Ford GT in fourteenth place overall. The GT Daytona class was won by Bret Curtis and Jens Klingmann in the Turner Motorsport BMW M6 GT3.

=== Post-race ===
With a total of 220 points, Barbosa and Fittipaldi's second-place finished allowed them to keep their advantage in the Prototype Drivers' Championship. Curran and Cameron advanced from third to second. The final results of PC allowed Popow and van der Zande to extend their advantage in the Drivers' Championship to 14 points over Alon and Kimber-Smith. Gavin and Milner's fourth-place finish kept them atop the GTLM Drivers' Championship, but their advantage was reduced to 5 points over race winners Briscoe and Westbrook. Balzan and Nielsen's fourth-place finish allowed them to increase their advantage in the GTD Drivers' Championship to 22 points over Farnbacher and Riberas. Davis and Liddell advanced from sixth to fifth while Keen and MacNeil dropped to seventh. Chevrolet and Ferrari continued to top their respective Manufactures' Championships while Action Express Racing, Starworks Motorsport, Corvette Racing, and Scuderia Corsa kept their respective advantages in their of Teams' Championships with five rounds left in the season.

=== Race results ===
Class winners are denoted in bold and ‡. P stands for Prototype, PC (Prototype Challenge), GTLM (Grand Touring Le Mans) and GTD (Grand Touring Daytona).

Final race classification
Pos	Class	No.	Team	Drivers	Chassis	Tire	Laps	Time/Retired
Pos	Class	No.	Team	Drivers	Engine	Tire	Laps	Time/Retired
1	**P**	**31**	**(United States) Action Express Racing**	**(United States) Eric Curran (United States) Dane Cameron**	**Corvette Daytona Prototype**	C	**125**	**2:41:22.601‡**
1	**P**	**31**	**(United States) Action Express Racing**	**(United States) Eric Curran (United States) Dane Cameron**	**Chevrolet 5.5 L V8**	C	**125**	**2:41:22.601‡**
2	P	5	(United States) Action Express Racing	(Portugal) João Barbosa (Brazil) Christian Fittipaldi	Corvette Daytona Prototype	C	125	+10.112
2	P	5	(United States) Action Express Racing	(Portugal) João Barbosa (Brazil) Christian Fittipaldi	Chevrolet 5.5 L V8	C	125	+10.112
3	P	10	(United States) Wayne Taylor Racing	(United States) Jordan Taylor (United States) Ricky Taylor	Corvette Daytona Prototype	C	125	+18.124
3	P	10	(United States) Wayne Taylor Racing	(United States) Jordan Taylor (United States) Ricky Taylor	Chevrolet 5.5 L V8	C	125	+18.124
4	P	90	(United States) VisitFlorida Racing	(Belgium) Marc Goossens (United Kingdom) Ryan Dalziel	Corvette Daytona Prototype	C	125	+32.183
4	P	90	(United States) VisitFlorida Racing	(Belgium) Marc Goossens (United Kingdom) Ryan Dalziel	Chevrolet 5.5 L V8	C	125	+32.183
5	P	70	(Japan) Mazda Motorsports	(United States) Tom Long (United States) Joel Miller	Mazda Prototype	C	125	+42.575
5	P	70	(Japan) Mazda Motorsports	(United States) Tom Long (United States) Joel Miller	Mazda MZ-2.0T 2.0 L I4 Turbo	C	125	+42.575
6	**PC**	**54**	**(United States) CORE Autosport**	**(United States) Jon Bennett (United States) Colin Braun**	**Oreca FLM09**	C	**123**	**+2 Laps‡**
6	**PC**	**54**	**(United States) CORE Autosport**	**(United States) Jon Bennett (United States) Colin Braun**	**Chevrolet 6.2 L V8**	C	**123**	**+2 Laps‡**
7	PC	8	(United States) Starworks Motorsport	(Venezuela) Alex Popow (Netherlands) Renger van der Zande	Oreca FLM09	C	123	+2 Laps
7	PC	8	(United States) Starworks Motorsport	(Venezuela) Alex Popow (Netherlands) Renger van der Zande	Chevrolet 6.2 L V8	C	123	+2 Laps
8	PC	52	(United States) PR1/Mathiasen Motorsports	(United States) Robert Alon (United Kingdom) Tom Kimber-Smith	Oreca FLM09	C	123	+2 Laps
8	PC	52	(United States) PR1/Mathiasen Motorsports	(United States) Robert Alon (United Kingdom) Tom Kimber-Smith	Chevrolet 6.2 L V8	C	123	+2 Laps
9	PC	38	(United States) Performance Tech Motorsports	(United States) James French (Canada) Kyle Marcelli	Oreca FLM09	C	123	+2 Laps
9	PC	38	(United States) Performance Tech Motorsports	(United States) James French (Canada) Kyle Marcelli	Chevrolet 6.2 L V8	C	123	+2 Laps
10	PC	85	(United States) JDC-Miller MotorSports	(Canada) Misha Goikhberg (South Africa) Stephen Simpson	Oreca FLM09	C	122	+3 Laps
10	PC	85	(United States) JDC-Miller MotorSports	(Canada) Misha Goikhberg (South Africa) Stephen Simpson	Chevrolet 6.2 L V8	C	122	+3 Laps
11	P	60	(United States) Michael Shank Racing with Curb-Agajanian	(United States) John Pew (Brazil) Oswaldo Negri Jr.	Ligier JS P2	C	122	+3 Laps
11	P	60	(United States) Michael Shank Racing with Curb-Agajanian	(United States) John Pew (Brazil) Oswaldo Negri Jr.	Honda HR35TT 3.5 Turbo V6	C	122	+3 Laps
12	PC	20	(United States) BAR1 Motorsports	(United States) Matt McMurry (United Kingdom) Johnny Mowlem	Oreca FLM09	C	122	+3 Laps
12	PC	20	(United States) BAR1 Motorsports	(United States) Matt McMurry (United Kingdom) Johnny Mowlem	Chevrolet 6.2 L V8	C	122	+3 Laps
13	P	0	(United States) Panoz DeltaWing Racing	(United Kingdom) Katherine Legge (United States) Sean Rayhall	DeltaWing DWC13	C	121	+4 Laps
13	P	0	(United States) Panoz DeltaWing Racing	(United Kingdom) Katherine Legge (United States) Sean Rayhall	Élan (Mazda) 1.9 L I4 Turbo	C	121	+4 Laps
14	**GTLM**	**67**	**(United States) Ford Chip Ganassi Racing**	**(Australia) Ryan Briscoe (United Kingdom) Richard Westbrook**	**Ford GT**	M	**119**	**+6 Laps‡**
14	**GTLM**	**67**	**(United States) Ford Chip Ganassi Racing**	**(Australia) Ryan Briscoe (United Kingdom) Richard Westbrook**	**Ford EcoBoost 3.5 L Twin-turbo V6**	M	**119**	**+6 Laps‡**
15	GTLM	4	(United States) Corvette Racing	(United Kingdom) Oliver Gavin (United States) Tommy Milner	Chevrolet Corvette C7.R	M	119	+6 Laps
15	GTLM	4	(United States) Corvette Racing	(United Kingdom) Oliver Gavin (United States) Tommy Milner	Chevrolet LT5.5 5.5 L V8	M	119	+6 Laps
16	PC	88	(United States) Starworks Motorsport	(United States) Mark Kvamme (United Kingdom) Richard Bradley	Oreca FLM09	C	119	+6 Laps
16	PC	88	(United States) Starworks Motorsport	(United States) Mark Kvamme (United Kingdom) Richard Bradley	Chevrolet 6.2 L V8	C	119	+6 Laps
17	GTLM	3	(United States) Corvette Racing	(Spain) Antonio García (Denmark) Jan Magnussen	Chevrolet Corvette C7.R	M	119	+6 Laps
17	GTLM	3	(United States) Corvette Racing	(Spain) Antonio García (Denmark) Jan Magnussen	Chevrolet LT5.5 5.5 L V8	M	119	+6 Laps
18	GTLM	25	(United States) BMW Team RLL	(United States) Bill Auberlen (Germany) Dirk Werner	BMW M6 GTLM	M	119	+6 Laps
18	GTLM	25	(United States) BMW Team RLL	(United States) Bill Auberlen (Germany) Dirk Werner	BMW 4.4 L Turbo V8	M	119	+6 Laps
19	GTLM	66	(United States) Ford Chip Ganassi Racing	(Germany) Dirk Müller (United States) Joey Hand	Ford GT	M	119	+6 Laps
19	GTLM	66	(United States) Ford Chip Ganassi Racing	(Germany) Dirk Müller (United States) Joey Hand	Ford EcoBoost 3.5 L Twin-turbo V6	M	119	+6 Laps
20	GTLM	912	(United States) Porsche North America	(New Zealand) Earl Bamber (France) Frédéric Makowiecki	Porsche 911 RSR	M	119	+6 Laps
20	GTLM	912	(United States) Porsche North America	(New Zealand) Earl Bamber (France) Frédéric Makowiecki	Porsche 4.0 L Flat-6	M	119	+6 Laps
21	GTLM	62	(United States) Risi Competizione	(Finland) Toni Vilander (Italy) Giancarlo Fisichella	Ferrari 488 GTE	M	119	+6 Laps
21	GTLM	62	(United States) Risi Competizione	(Finland) Toni Vilander (Italy) Giancarlo Fisichella	Ferrari F154CB 3.9 L Turbo V8	M	119	+6 Laps
22	GTLM	911	(United States) Porsche North America	(France) Patrick Pilet (United Kingdom) Nick Tandy	Porsche 911 RSR	M	119	+6 Laps
22	GTLM	911	(United States) Porsche North America	(France) Patrick Pilet (United Kingdom) Nick Tandy	Porsche 4.0 L Flat-6	M	119	+6 Laps
23	**GTD**	**96**	**(United States) Turner Motorsport**	**(United States) Bret Curtis (Germany) Jens Klingmann**	**BMW M6 GT3**	C	**116**	**+9 Laps‡**
23	**GTD**	**96**	**(United States) Turner Motorsport**	**(United States) Bret Curtis (Germany) Jens Klingmann**	**BMW 4.4 L Turbo V8**	C	**116**	**+9 Laps‡**
24	GTD	6	(United States) Stevenson Motorsports	(United States) Andrew Davis (United Kingdom) Robin Liddell	Audi R8 LMS	C	116	+9 Laps
24	GTD	6	(United States) Stevenson Motorsports	(United States) Andrew Davis (United Kingdom) Robin Liddell	Audi 5.2L V10	C	116	+9 Laps
25	GTD	48	(United States) Paul Miller Racing	(United States) Bryan Sellers (United States) Madison Snow	Lamborghini Huracán GT3	C	116	+9 Laps
25	GTD	48	(United States) Paul Miller Racing	(United States) Bryan Sellers (United States) Madison Snow	Lamborghini 5.2 L V10	C	116	+9 Laps
26	GTD	63	(United States) Scuderia Corsa	(Denmark) Christina Nielsen (Italy) Alessandro Balzan	Ferrari 488 GT3	C	116	+9 Laps
26	GTD	63	(United States) Scuderia Corsa	(Denmark) Christina Nielsen (Italy) Alessandro Balzan	Ferrari F154CB 3.9 L Turbo V8	C	116	+9 Laps
27	GTD	16	(United States) Change Racing	(United States) Corey Lewis (United States) Spencer Pumpelly	Lamborghini Huracán GT3	C	116	+9 Laps
27	GTD	16	(United States) Change Racing	(United States) Corey Lewis (United States) Spencer Pumpelly	Lamborghini 5.2 L V10	C	116	+9 Laps
28	GTD	73	(United States) Park Place Motorsports	(Germany) Jörg Bergmeister (United States) Patrick Lindsey	Porsche 911 GT3 R	C	116	+9 Laps
28	GTD	73	(United States) Park Place Motorsports	(Germany) Jörg Bergmeister (United States) Patrick Lindsey	Porsche 4.0 L Flat-6	C	116	+9 Laps
29	GTD	22	(United States) Alex Job Racing	(United States) Cooper MacNeil (United States) Leh Keen	Porsche 911 GT3 R	C	115	+10 Laps
29	GTD	22	(United States) Alex Job Racing	(United States) Cooper MacNeil (United States) Leh Keen	Porsche 4.0 L Flat-6	C	115	+10 Laps
30	GTD	27	(United States) Dream Racing	(Monaco) Cédric Sbirrazzuoli (Italy) Fabio Babini	Lamborghini Huracán GT3	C	115	+10 Laps
30	GTD	27	(United States) Dream Racing	(Monaco) Cédric Sbirrazzuoli (Italy) Fabio Babini	Lamborghini 5.2 L V10	C	115	+10 Laps
31	GTD	9	(United States) Stevenson Motorsports	(United States) Lawson Aschenbach (United States) Matt Bell	Audi R8 LMS	C	114	+11 Laps
31	GTD	9	(United States) Stevenson Motorsports	(United States) Lawson Aschenbach (United States) Matt Bell	Audi 5.2L V10	C	114	+11 Laps
32 DNF	GTD	44	(United States) Magnus Racing	(United States) John Potter (United States) Andy Lally	Audi R8 LMS	C	112	Accident
32 DNF	GTD	44	(United States) Magnus Racing	(United States) John Potter (United States) Andy Lally	Audi 5.2L V10	C	112	Accident
33	GTD	33	(United States) Riley Motorsports	(Netherlands) Jeroen Bleekemolen (United States) Ben Keating	Dodge Viper GT3-R	C	110	+15 Laps
33	GTD	33	(United States) Riley Motorsports	(Netherlands) Jeroen Bleekemolen (United States) Ben Keating	Dodge 8.3L V10	C	110	+15 Laps
34	GTLM	100	(United States) BMW Team RLL	(United States) John Edwards (Germany) Lucas Luhr	BMW M6 GTLM	M	108	+17 Laps
34	GTLM	100	(United States) BMW Team RLL	(United States) John Edwards (Germany) Lucas Luhr	BMW 4.4 L Turbo V8	M	108	+17 Laps
35	GTD	23	(United States) Team Seattle/Alex Job Racing	(Germany) Mario Farnbacher (Spain) Alex Riberas	Porsche 911 GT3 R	C	106	+19 Laps
35	GTD	23	(United States) Team Seattle/Alex Job Racing	(Germany) Mario Farnbacher (Spain) Alex Riberas	Porsche 4.0 L Flat-6	C	106	+19 Laps
36 DNF	P	55	(Japan) Mazda Motorsports	(United States) Jonathan Bomarito (United States) Tristan Nunez	Mazda Prototype	C	60	Rear hub
36 DNF	P	55	(Japan) Mazda Motorsports	(United States) Jonathan Bomarito (United States) Tristan Nunez	Mazda MZ-2.0T 2.0 L I4 Turbo	C	60	Rear hub
37 DNF	GTD	97	(United States) Turner Motorsport	(United States) Michael Marsal (Finland) Markus Palttala	BMW M6 GT3	C	34	Gearbox
37 DNF	GTD	97	(United States) Turner Motorsport	(United States) Michael Marsal (Finland) Markus Palttala	BMW 4.4L Turbo V8	C	34	Gearbox

Tyre manufacturers
Key
Symbol	Tyre manufacturer
**C**	Continental
**M**	Michelin

== Championship standings after the race ==
Prototype Drivers' Championship standings
Pos.	+/–	Driver	Points
1		(Portugal) João Barbosa (Brazil) Christian Fittipaldi	220
2	1	(United States) Eric Curran (United States) Dane Cameron	216
3	1	(United States) Jordan Taylor (United States) Ricky Taylor	211
4		(Belgium) Marc Goossens	197
5		(Brazil) Oswaldo Negri Jr.	191

PC Drivers' Championship standings
Pos.	+/–	Driver	Points
1		(Venezuela) Alex Popow (Netherlands) Renger van der Zande	231
2		(United States) Robert Alon (United Kingdom) Tom Kimber-Smith	217
3		(South Africa) Stephen Simpson (Canada) Misha Goikhberg	209
4		(United States) Jon Bennett (United States) Colin Braun	188
5		(United States) James French (Canada) Kyle Marcelli	179

GTLM Drivers' Championship standings
Pos.	+/–	Driver	Points
1		(United Kingdom) Oliver Gavin (United States) Tommy Milner	192
2		(Australia) Ryan Briscoe (United Kingdom) Richard Westbrook	187
3		(United States) Bill Auberlen (Germany) Dirk Werner	170
4	1	(New Zealand) Earl Bamber (France) Frédéric Makowiecki	166
5	1	(Spain) Antonio García (Denmark) Jan Magnussen	164

GTD Drivers' Championship standings
Pos.	+/–	Driver	Points
1		(Italy) Alessandro Balzan (Denmark) Christina Nielsen	191
2		(Germany) Mario Farnbacher (Spain) Alex Riberas	169
3		(United States) Andy Lally (United States) John Potter	163
4		(Netherlands) Jeroen Bleekemolen (United States) Ben Keating	155
5	1	(United States) Andrew Davis (United Kingdom) Robin Liddell	152

- Note: Only the top five positions are included for all sets of standings.

Prototype Teams' Championship standings
Pos.	+/–	Team	Points
1		(United States) No. 5 Action Express Racing	220
2	1	(United States) No. 31 Action Express Racing	216
3	1	(United States) No. 10 Wayne Taylor Racing	211
4		(United States) No. 90 VisitFlorida Racing	197
5		(United States) No. 60 Michael Shank Racing with Curb-Agajanian	191

PC Teams' Championship standings
Pos.	+/–	Team	Points
1		(United States) No. 8 Starworks Motorsport	231
2		(United States) No. 52 PR1/Mathiasen Motorsports	217
3	1	(United States) No. 54 CORE Autosport	211
4	1	(United States) No. 85 JDC-Miller MotorSports	209
5		(United States) No. 38 Performance Tech Motorsports	204

GTLM Teams' Championship standings
Pos.	+/–	Team	Points
1		(United States) No. 4 Corvette Racing	192
2		(United States) No. 67 Ford Chip Ganassi Racing	187
3		(United States) No. 25 BMW Team RLL	170
4	1	(United States) No. 912 Porsche North America	166
5	2	(United States) No. 3 Corvette Racing	164

GTD Teams' Championship standings
Pos.	+/–	Team	Points
1		(United States) No. 63 Scuderia Corsa	191
2		(United States) No. 23 Team Seattle/Alex Job Racing	169
3		(United States) No. 44 Magnus Racing	163
4		(United States) No. 33 Riley Motorsports	155
5	1	(United States) No. 6 Stevenson Motorsports	152

- Note: Only the top five positions are included for all sets of standings.

Prototype Manufacturers' Championship standings
Pos.	+/–	Manufacturer	Points
1		(United States) Chevrolet	236
2		(Japan) Honda	227
3		(Japan) Mazda	212
4		(Germany) BMW	56
5		(United States) Ford	30

GTLM Manufacturers' Championship standings
Pos.	+/–	Manufacturer	Points
1		(United States) Chevrolet	192
2	1	(United States) Ford	185
3	1	(Germany) Porsche	181
4	1	(Germany) BMW	174
5	1	(Italy) Ferrari	174

GTD Manufacturers' Championship standings
Pos.	+/–	Manufacturer	Points
1		(Italy) Ferrari	185
2	1	(Germany) Audi	185
3	1	(Germany) Porsche	183
4	1	(Germany) BMW	169
5	1	(United States) Dodge	167

- Note: Only the top five positions are included for all sets of standings.

IMSA SportsCar Championship
Previous race: 6 Hours of The Glen	2016 season	Next race: Northeast Grand Prix
