= 2015 U.S. F2000 National Championship =

Car racing competition

Seasons
- ← 2014 2016 →

The 2015 U.S. F2000 National Championship was the sixth season – since its revival in 2010 – of the U.S. F2000 National Championship, an open wheel auto racing series that is the first step in INDYCAR's Road to Indy ladder, and is owned by Andersen Promotions. It was the second season featuring a single class of competition. The schedule expanded to 16 races from 14 in 2014 with the addition of a pair of races at NOLA Motorsports Park and Mazda Raceway Laguna Seca, where the series previously raced in 2013. Nearby Sonoma Raceway was dropped from the schedule.

French second year driver Nico Jamin captured the championship driving for Cape Motorsports with Wayne Taylor Racing. Jamin won ten of the sixteen rounds and finished on the podium of every race except one. American Jake Eidson of Pabst Racing finished on the podium in every race but two, however, he only won four races and Jamin soundly exceeded him for the championship by 72 points. Cape's Aaron Telitz captured one victory among his ten podium finishes and captured third in the championship. Brazilian Victor Franzoni captured a win in the fourth round of the championship, but his team was suspended for repeated equipment rules violations and Franzoni moved to the Pro Mazda Championship. Australian Anthony Martin finished on the podium five times and captured rookie of the year honors.

== Drivers and teams ==
Team	No.	Driver(s)	Status	Round(s)
Abel Motorsports	51	(United States) Bill Abel	R	7–9
Afterburner Autosport (Note: Skipped Indianapolis, LOR & Toronto due to team sanctions)	17	(Brazil) Victor Franzoni		1–6
Afterburner Autosport	17	(United Kingdom) Sennan Fielding	R	12–14
Afterburner Autosport	18	(United States) Jack Mitchell	R	12–16
ArmsUp Motorsports	5	(Germany) Keyvan Andres Soori		All
ArmsUp Motorsports	6	(United States) Max Hanratty	R	All
ArmsUp Motorsports	7	(United States) Peter Portante		15–16
ArmsUp Motorsports	16	(Canada) James Dayson		All
Cape Motorsports with WTR	2	(France) Nico Jamin		All
Cape Motorsports with WTR	3	(United States) Aaron Telitz		All
D2D Motorsports	61	(United States) Andrew List (Note: Missed NOLA to Mid-Ohio due to practice crash during testing)		1–2, 12–14
JAY Motorsports	12	(United States) Augie Lerch	R	1–9
JDC Motorsports	19	(United States) Sam Chastain	R	7–8
JDC Motorsports	19	(United States) Robert Alon	R	15–16
JDC Motorsports	80	(Canada) Parker Thompson	R	All
John Cummiskey Racing	33	(Australia) Anthony Martin	R	All
John Cummiskey Racing	94	(Australia) Jordan Lloyd	R	1–4
Pabst Racing	22	(United States) Jake Eidson		All
Pabst Racing	23	(China) Luo Yufeng	R	All
RJB Motorsports	9	(United States) Alex Mayer	R	12–14
RJB Motorsports	10	(United States) Clint McMahan	R	12–14
Swan Motorsports	9	(United States) Tyler Hunter	R	7–8
Team Pelfrey	81	(Norway) Ayla Ågren	R	All
Team Pelfrey	82	(Australia) Luke Gabin	R	All
Team Pelfrey	83	(United States) Garth Rickards	R	All
Team Pelfrey	84	(Russia) Nikita Lastochkin	R	All

Icon	Status
R	Rookie

== Schedule ==
The series schedule was announced on November 3, 2014. The series visited NOLA Motorsports Park for the first time, expanding the schedule to 16 races, and returned to Laguna Seca after a one-year absence, replacing Sonoma Raceway in support of the Road to Indy season finale standalone event.

Icon	Legend
O	Oval/Speedway
R	Road course
S	Street circuit

Rd.	Date	Race name	Track	Location
1	March 28–29	Cooper Tires Grand Prix of St. Petersburg	S Streets of St. Petersburg	St. Petersburg, Florida
2	March 28–29	Cooper Tires Grand Prix of St. Petersburg	S Streets of St. Petersburg	St. Petersburg, Florida
3	April 11–12	Cooper Tires Grand Prix of Louisiana	R NOLA Motorsports Park	Avondale, Louisiana
4	April 11–12	Cooper Tires Grand Prix of Louisiana	R NOLA Motorsports Park	Avondale, Louisiana
5	April 25–26	Cooper Tires Grand Prix of Alabama	R Barber Motorsports Park	Birmingham, Alabama
6	April 25–26	Cooper Tires Grand Prix of Alabama	R Barber Motorsports Park	Birmingham, Alabama
7	May 8–9	Mazda USF2000 Grand Prix of Indianapolis	R Indianapolis Motor Speedway Road Course	Speedway, Indiana
8	May 8–9	Mazda USF2000 Grand Prix of Indianapolis	R Indianapolis Motor Speedway Road Course	Speedway, Indiana
9	May 23	Mazda Freedom 75	O Lucas Oil Raceway	Clermont, Indiana
10	June 13–14	Allied Building Products Grand Prix of Toronto	S Exhibition Place	Toronto, Ontario
11	June 13–14	Allied Building Products Grand Prix of Toronto	S Exhibition Place	Toronto, Ontario
12	August 1–2	Allied Building Products Grand Prix of Mid-Ohio	R Mid-Ohio Sports Car Course	Lexington, Ohio
13	August 1–2	Allied Building Products Grand Prix of Mid-Ohio	R Mid-Ohio Sports Car Course	Lexington, Ohio
14	August 1–2	Allied Building Products Grand Prix of Mid-Ohio	R Mid-Ohio Sports Car Course	Lexington, Ohio
15	September 12–13	Cooper Tires USF2000 Grand Prix powered by Mazda	R Mazda Raceway Laguna Seca	Monterey, California
16	September 12–13	Cooper Tires USF2000 Grand Prix powered by Mazda	R Mazda Raceway Laguna Seca	Monterey, California

== Race results ==
Rd.	Track	Pole position	Fastest lap	Most laps led	Race winner	
Rd.	Track	Pole position	Fastest lap	Most laps led	Driver	Team
1	Streets of St. Petersburg	(United States) Jake Eidson	(United States) Jake Eidson	(United States) Jake Eidson	(United States) Jake Eidson	Pabst Racing
2	Streets of St. Petersburg		(United States) Aaron Telitz	(United States) Jake Eidson	(United States) Jake Eidson	Pabst Racing
3	NOLA Motorsports Park	(France) Nico Jamin	(United States) Aaron Telitz	(France) Nico Jamin	(France) Nico Jamin	Cape Motorsports with WTR
4	NOLA Motorsports Park		(Brazil) Victor Franzoni	(Brazil) Victor Franzoni	(Brazil) Victor Franzoni	Afterburner Autosport
5	Barber Motorsports Park	(France) Nico Jamin	(Brazil) Victor Franzoni	(Brazil) Victor Franzoni	(United States) Aaron Telitz	Cape Motorsports with WTR
6	Barber Motorsports Park		(France) Nico Jamin	(France) Nico Jamin	(France) Nico Jamin	Cape Motorsports with WTR
7	Indianapolis Motor Speedway road course	(France) Nico Jamin	(United States) Aaron Telitz	(United States) Aaron Telitz	(France) Nico Jamin	Cape Motorsports with WTR
8	Indianapolis Motor Speedway road course		(France) Nico Jamin	(France) Nico Jamin	(France) Nico Jamin	Cape Motorsports with WTR
9	Lucas Oil Raceway at Indianapolis	(France) Nico Jamin	(France) Nico Jamin	(United States) Jake Eidson	(United States) Jake Eidson	Pabst Racing
10	Streets of Toronto	(France) Nico Jamin	(United States) Jake Eidson	(United States) Jake Eidson	(United States) Jake Eidson	Pabst Racing
11	Streets of Toronto		(France) Nico Jamin	(France) Nico Jamin	(France) Nico Jamin	Cape Motorsports with WTR
12	Mid-Ohio Sports Car Course	(France) Nico Jamin	(France) Nico Jamin	(France) Nico Jamin	(France) Nico Jamin	Cape Motorsports with WTR
13	Mid-Ohio Sports Car Course		(France) Nico Jamin	(France) Nico Jamin	(France) Nico Jamin	Cape Motorsports with WTR
14	Mid-Ohio Sports Car Course		(France) Nico Jamin	(France) Nico Jamin	(France) Nico Jamin	Cape Motorsports with WTR
15	Mazda Raceway Laguna Seca	(France) Nico Jamin	(France) Nico Jamin	(France) Nico Jamin	(France) Nico Jamin	Cape Motorsports with WTR
16	Mazda Raceway Laguna Seca		(France) Nico Jamin	(France) Nico Jamin	(France) Nico Jamin	Cape Motorsports with WTR

== Championship standings ==
=== Drivers' Championship ===
Pos	Driver	STP		NOL		BAR		IMS		LOR	TOR		MOH			LAG		Points
1	(France) Nico Jamin	3	3	**1***	2	**14**	1*	**1**	1*	**2**	**2**	1*	**1***	1*	1*	**1***	1*	457
2	(United States) Jake Eidson	**1***	1*	3	3	3	3	2	12	1*	1*	2	4	2	3	3	3	385
3	(United States) Aaron Telitz	2	2	2	16	1	4	3*	2	3	6	5	3	3	2	4	2	348
4	(Australia) Anthony Martin	4	4	16	5	4	2	4	3	4	3	4	2	14	4	2	4	300
5	(Canada) Parker Thompson	15	6	7	4	5	5	14	6	6	11	12	5	4	5	5	14	221
6	(Australia) Luke Gabin	17	9	8	14	15	14	5	4	8	4	3	7	7	6	15	15	194
7	(China) Luo Yufeng	5	14	15	9	8	6	17	5	5	12	7	6	8	12	8	9	193
8	(Russia) Nikita Lastochkin	10	8	10	12	10	8	8	7	12	8	8	11	10	10	7	5	193
9	(United States) Garth Rickards	7	15	11	8	6	11	7	17	9	5	6	18	5	8	9	10	186
10	(Norway) Ayla Ågren	9	10	9	11	9	10	6	14	11	7	9	10	6	11	11	7	186
11	(Germany) Keyvan Andres Soori	16	7	6	7	7	7	15	10	7	13	13	8	11	18	6	8	177
12	(United States) Max Hanratty	11	11	12	13	11	9	16	9	10	9	10	14	13	13	13	11	151
13	(Canada) James Dayson	14	13	14	15	13	13	12	15	15	10	11	16	16	16	14	13	116
14	(Brazil) Victor Franzoni	6	16	4	1*	2*	DSQ											98
15	(United States) Augie Lerch	13	DNS	13	10	12	12	10	16	13								69
16	(Australia) Jordan Lloyd	8	5	5	6													62
17	(United Kingdom) Sennan Fielding												9	9	7			38
18	(United States) Andrew List	12	12										17	17	15			32
19	(United States) Jack Mitchell												12	12	9			30
20	(United States) Peter Portante															10	6	26
21	(United States) Sam Chastain							9	8									25
22	(United States) Bill Abel							13	13	14								23
23	(United States) Tyler Hunter							11	11									20
24	(United States) Alex Mayer												15	15	14			19
25	(United States) Robert Alon															12	12	18
26	(United States) Clint McMahan												13	18	17			15
Pos	Driver	STP		NOL		BAR		IMS		LOR	TOR		MOH			LAG		Points

Color	Result
Gold	Winner
Silver	2nd place
Bronze	3rd place
Green	4th & 5th place
Light Blue	6th–10th place
Dark Blue	Finished (Outside Top 10)
Purple	Did not finish
Red	Did not qualify (DNQ)
Brown	Withdrawn (Wth)
Black	Disqualified (DSQ)
White	Did not start (DNS)
Blank	Did not participate

**In-line notation**
**Bold**	Pole position (1 point)
Italics	Ran fastest race lap (1 point)
*	Led most race laps (1 point); Not awarded if more than one driver leads most laps
Rookie

=== Teams' Championship ===
Pos	Team	Points
1	Cape Motorsports w/ Wayne Taylor Racing	538
2	Pabst Racing	335
3	John Cummiskey Racing	260
4	Team Pelfrey	188
5	JDC Motorsports	158
6	ArmsUp Motorsports	99
7	Afterburner Autosport	92
8	JAY Motorsports	35
9	D2D Motorsports	20
10	Abel Motorsports	12
11	Swan Racing	9
12	RJB Motorsports	6
