= Matthew Round-Garrido =

British racing driver

- Nationality: (United Kingdom) British (Spain) Spanish
- Born: 20 April 2000 (age 26) Stourbridge, England, United Kingdom

Indy Pro 2000 Championship career
- Debut season: 2019
- Current team: Exclusive Autosport
- Car number: 92
- Starts: 6
- Wins: 0
- Podiums: 0
- Poles: 0
- Fastest laps: 0
- Best finish: 17th in 2019

Previous series
- 2019–2021 2020–21 2018 2016–18: U.S. F2000 National Championship; FR Americas Championship; Formula Ford Championship; Formula Ford Festival

Matthew Round-Garrido (born 20 April 2000) is a Spanish-British racing driver who most recently competed in the Indy Pro 2000 Championship with Exclusive Autosport. Round-Garrido previously competed in the U.S. F2000 National Championship with Exclusive Autosport.

== Racing career ==
=== Indy Pro 2000 ===
On February 11, 2022, it was announced that Round-Garrido would move up to the Indy Pro 2000 Championship with Exclusive Autosport to compete in the 2022 season.

== Racing record ==
=== Career summary ===
Season	Series	Team	Races	Wins	Poles	F/Laps	Podiums	Points	Position
2016	Formula Ford Festival	N/A	1	0	0	0	0	0	16th
2017	Formula Ford Festival	N/A	1	0	0	0	0	0	9th
2018	Formula Ford Festival	N/A	1	0	0	0	0	0	9th
2018	National Formula Ford Championship	N/A	23	2	1	2	7	376	3rd
2019	Indy Pro 2000 Championship	BN Racing Jay Howard Driver Development	4	0	0	0	0	34	17th
2019	U.S. F2000 National Championship	Jay Howard Driver Development	5	0	0	0	0	122	14th
2019	U.S. F2000 National Championship	BN Racing	6	0	0	0	1	122	14th
2020	Formula Regional Americas Championship	Velocity Racing Development	3	0	0	0	0	12	16th
2020	U.S. F2000 National Championship	Pabst Racing	17	0	0	0	0	228	7th
2021	Formula Regional Americas Championship	Velocity Racing Development	3	0	0	0	0	10	19th
2021	U.S. F2000 National Championship	Exclusive Autosport	13	0	0	0	1	116	16th
2022	Indy Pro 2000 Championship	Exclusive Autosport	2	0	0	0	0	23	19th

*Season still in progress.

== Motorsports career results ==
=== American open-wheel racing results ===
==== U.S. F2000 Championship ====
(key) (Races in bold indicate pole position) (Races in italics indicate fastest lap) (Races with * indicate most race laps led)

Year	Team	1	2	3	4	5	6	7	8	9	10	11	12	13	14	15	16	17	18	Rank	Points
2019	Jay Howard Driver Development	STP; 1; 12	STP; 2; 9	IMS; 1; 13	IMS; 2; 17	LOR; 16														14th	122
2019	BN Racing						ROA; 1; 15	ROA; 2; 8	TOR; 1; 8	TOR; 2; 3	MOH; 1; 4	MOH; 2; 13	POR; 1	POR; 2	POR; 1	POR; 2				14th	122
2020	Pabst Racing	ROA; 1; 4	ROA; 2; 4	MOH; 1; 5	MOH; 2; 4	MOH; 3; 19	LOR; 7	IMS; 1; 7	IMS; 2; 14	IMS; 3; 9	MOH; 4; 8	MOH; 5; 5	MOH; 6; 6	NJMP; 1; 8	NJMP; 2; 17	NJMP; 3; 14	STP; 1; 7	STP; 2; 6		7th	228
2021	Exclusive Autosport	ALA; 1; 25	ALA; 2; 22	STP; 1; 2	STP; 2; 4	IMS; 1; 25	IMS; 2; 12	IMS; 3; 20	LOR; 24	ROA; 1; 13	ROA; 2; 19	MOH; 1; 12	MOH; 2; 4	MOH; 3; 4	NJMP; 1	NJMP; 2	NJMP; 3	MOH; 1	MOH; 2	16th	116

==== Indy Pro 2000 Championship ====
(key) (Races in bold indicate pole position) (Races in italics indicate fastest lap) (Races with * indicate most race laps led)

Year	Team	1	2	3	4	5	6	7	8	9	10	11	12	13	14	15	16	17	18	Rank	Points
2019	BN Racing w/ Jay Howard Driver Development	STP; 1	STP; 2	IMS; 1	IMS; 2	LOR	ROA; 1	ROA; 2	TOR; 1	TOR; 2	MOH; 1	MOH; 2	GTW	POR; 1; 13	POR; 2; 12	LAG; 1; 15	LAG; 2; 10			17th	34
2022	Exclusive Autosport	STP; 1; 10	STP; 2; 9	ALA; 1	ALA; 2	IMS; 1	IMS; 2	IMS; 3	IRP	ROA; 1	ROA; 2	MOH; 1	MOH; 2	TOR; 1	TOR; 2	GMP	POR; 1	POR; 2	POR; 3	19th	23

=== Complete Formula Regional Americas Championship results ===
(key) (Races in bold indicate pole position) (Races in italics indicate fastest lap)

Year	Team	1	2	3	4	5	6	7	8	9	10	11	12	13	14	15	16	17	18	Rank	Points
2020	Velocity Racing Development	MOH; 1	MOH; 2	VIR; 1	VIR; 2	VIR; 3	BAR; 1	BAR; 2	BAR; 3	SEB; 1 NC	SEB; 2; 8	SEB; 3; 6	HMS; 1	HMS; 2	HMS; 3	COA; 1	COA; 2	COA; 3		16th	12
2021	Velocity Racing Development	ATL; 1; 9	ATL; 2; 9	ATL; 3; 7	ROA; 1	ROA; 2	ROA; 3	MOH; 1	MOH; 2	MOH; 3	BRA; 1	BRA; 2	BRA; 3	VIR; 1	VIR; 2	VIR; 3	COA; 1	COA; 2	COA; 3	19th	10
