= 2024 USF Pro 2000 Championship =

Racing season

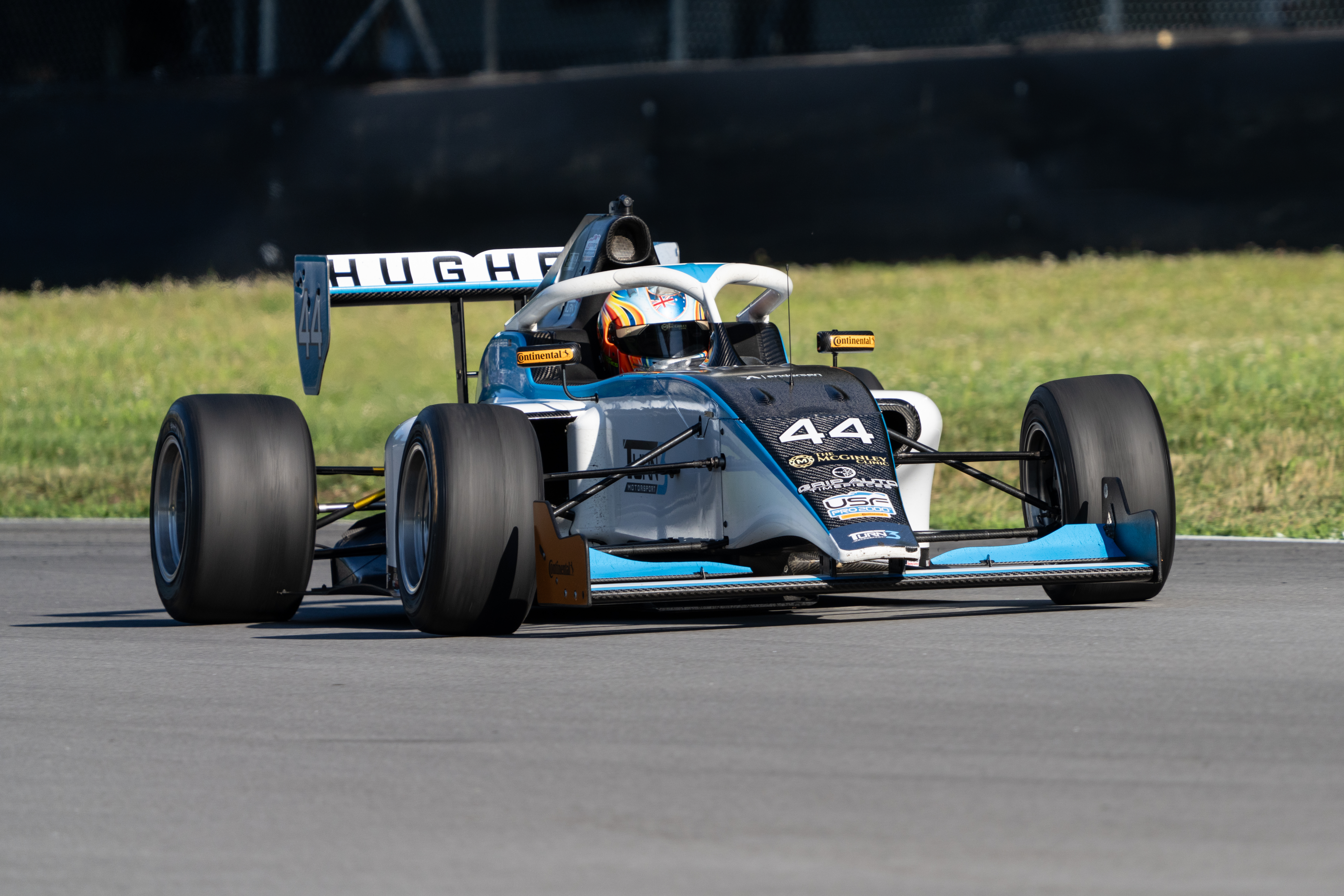
Drivers' Champion Lochie Hughes driving his No. 44 Turn 3 Motorsport car at Mid-Ohio.

The 2024 USF Pro 2000 Championship presented by Continental Tire was the 26th season in series history and the second under the USF Pro 2000 moniker after the three championships below the Indy NXT series were rebranded in 2023 following the acquisition of Indy NXT by Penske Entertainment.

Australian series rookie Lochie Hughes won the Drivers' Championship at the penultimate race of the season after collecting four wins and six further podium finishes. Pabst Racing, the team fielding the drivers in third and fourth in the standings, defended their Teams' Championship at the same race.

== Series news ==
- The scholarship for the champion was slightly increased to $681,500.
- All three ladder series organized by Andersen Promotions ended their long-running affiliation with Cooper Tires as supplier and presenting partner. Continental is the new tire supplier and title partner of the series.

== Drivers and teams ==
All drivers competed using Tatuus IP-22 racecars with Elite Mazda 2.0-014A engines and Continental tires.

Team	No.	Driver(s)	Status	Round(s)
BN Racing	74	(Colombia) Nicolás Baptiste	R	1–14
BN Racing	77	(Mexico) Ricardo Escotto		All
BN Racing	78	(Mexico) Arturo Flores	R	6–8, 10–12
BN Racing	78	(United States) Alessandro de Tullio	R	13–18
Comet/NCMP Racing	21	(United States) Logan Adams	R	1–8, 10–16
DEForce Racing	7	(Canada) Mac Clark	R	1–16
DEForce Racing	9	(Brazil) Nicholas Monteiro		All
DEForce Racing	10	(Mexico) Jorge Garciarce	R	All
Exclusive Autosport	92	(United States) Braden Eves		1–14
Exclusive Autosport	95	(United States) Avery Towns	R	1–2
FatBoy Racing!	83	(United States) Charles Finelli		6–12
Jay Howard Driver Development	4	(United States) Tanner DeFabis	R	17–18
Jay Howard Driver Development	6	(United States) Frankie Mossman		All
Pabst Racing	18	(United States) Simon Sikes	R	All
Pabst Racing	19	(United States) Christian Brooks	R	1–14
Pabst Racing	19	(Netherlands) Glenn van Berlo	R	15–18
Pabst Racing	20	(United States) Jace Denmark		All
TJ Speed Motorsports	26	(New Zealand) Liam Sceats	R	All
TJ Speed Motorsports	27	(United States) Hunter Yeany		1–8
TJ Speed Motorsports	27	(Italy) Francesco Pizzi		9
TJ Speed Motorsports	28	(United States) David Morales	R	1–5
TJ Speed Motorsports	28	(United States) Bryce Aron	R	9
TJ Speed Motorsports	28	(United States) Cooper Becklin	R	10–18
Turn 3 Motorsport	2	(Republic of Ireland) Adam Fitzgerald	R	1–8
Turn 3 Motorsport	3	(United States) Danny Dyszelski	R	All
Turn 3 Motorsport	33	(United States) Tyke Durst	R	All
Turn 3 Motorsport	44	(Australia) Lochie Hughes	R	All
Turn 3 Motorsport	68	(United States) Ethan Ho	R	1–14
Velocity Racing Development	17	(United States) Nikita Johnson		All
Velocity Racing Development	32	(United States) Shawn Rashid	R	1–5, 15–16
Velocity Racing Development	32	(Canada) Nico Christodoulou		10–14
Velocity Racing Development	65	(United States) Noah Ping	R	17–18

Icon	Status
R	Rookie

=== Team changes ===
Miller Vinatieri Motorsports left the series to move up to Indy NXT.

After NeoTech Motorsport's only driver Nicholas Monteiro moved to TJ Speed Motorsports halfway through 2023 and now joined DEForce Racing, the team discontinued their series entry.

BN Racing returned to the series with two full-time entries after last participating during the 2020 season.

Comet/NCMP Racing joined the championship, fielding a single car.

=== Driver changes ===
Reigning Teams' champions Pabst Racing signed two new drivers following Jordan Missig's departure from the series and reigning series champion Myles Rowe's graduation to Indy NXT. The team promoted Simon Sikes after he won the 2023 USF2000 Championship with the same team and signed Christian Brooks after he contested a handful of races during the 2023 season for Turn 3 Motorsport.

Turn 3 Motorsport saw a complete overhaul of their lineup, as the team took on five series rookies. One Irishman replaced another in the No. 2 car, with Formula Regional European competitor Adam Fitzgerald replacing Indy NXT-bound Jonathan Browne. Danny Dyszelski graduated from USF2000 competition to replace Louka St-Jean in the No. 3 car after having already contested the final two rounds of the 2023 season with the team. The No. 44 and No. 68 cars are also piloted by USF2000 graduates, with Lochie Hughes and Ethan Ho joining the team after coming third and 13th in the 2023 USF2000 championship, respectively. The teams final car, the No. 33 entry, is driven by Tyke Durst, who graduated from US Formula 4 competition and replaced IMSA VP Racing SportsCar Challenge-bound Jackson Lee.

DEForce Racing signed one Brazilian to replace another, with Kiko Porto joining ANSA Motorsports in the Lamborghini Super Trofeo North America and his seat being filled by Nicholas Monteiro, who came 19th in 2023 with NeoTech Motorsport and TJ Speed. The team also kept two drivers they fielded in the 2023 season finale, with Mac Clark replacing ELMS-bound Bijoy Garg and Jorge Garciarce remaining in the team's third car.

TJ Speed Motorsports also signed three new drivers to replace Lirim Zendeli, Christian Weir and Francesco Pizzi. The team signed FROC and FRJ runner-up Liam Sceats as well as two Americans returning from European competition in former FIA F3 competitor Hunter Yeany and GB3 and Eurocup-3 driver David Morales.

After running as many as four cars during some rounds in 2023, Exclusive Autosport downsized to one full-time entry in 2024. After Yuven Sundaramoorthy, Salvador de Alba and Lindsay Brewer all graduated to Indy NXT and Joel Granfors left the series, the team welcomed back Braden Eves, who competed with the team in the 2020 and 2021 seasons before a move to JHDD for 2022 and a hiatus in 2023. The team also fielded Avery Towns for the season opener at St. Petersburg.

Jack William Miller followed his family-run team's move to the Indy NXT championship.

Jay Howard Driver Development saw Ricardo Escotto move to BN Racing and Reece Ushijima depart the championship. The team retained Frankie Mossman, who already did five races with the team in 2023.

Velocity Racing Development expanded to two cars for the events at St. Petersburg and NOLA, with Nikita Johnson, who did the 2023 season finale with the team, being joined by Shawn Rashid and both drivers also embarking on a campaign in the GB3 championship through VRD's collaboration with Arden Motorsport.

Returning team BN Racing fielded two Latin American drivers, with Nicolás Baptiste returning to the Americas after competing in Formula Regional Europe and Ricardo Escotto departing JHDD to embark on his sophomore season in the championship.

New team Comet/NCMP Racing signed Logan Adams to drive their single entry, who jumps up to USF Pro 2000 after competing in US F4 and USF2000 in 2023.

==== Mid-season changes ====
Ahead of the Grand Prix of Indianapolis, David Morales left TJ Speed Motorsports due to budgetary constraints after crashing his car in both St. Petersburg and NOLA. He was not replaced. Mexican driver Arturo Flores joined the grid in the No. 78 BN Racing car, making his series debut after two years of competing in the F4 NACAM championship. Long-time driver Charles Finelli also rejoined the grid at Indianapolis in his own FatBoy Racing! team.

Ahead of the Freedom 90, Adam Fitzgerald announced he would not continue his championship campaign to focus on recovering from his back injury that he sustained in the crash that took Dilano van 't Hoff's life in 2023. TJ Speed Motorsport also altered their lineup further, with Indy NXT driver Bryce Aron joining to pilot Morales's No. 28 car and series returnee Francesco Pizzi taking over the No. 27 car from Yeany, who struggled for funding. Both Arturo Flores (BN Racing) and Logan Adams (Comet/NCMP Racing) were not entered.

Ahead of the round at Road America, Canadian driver Nico Christodoulou announced his step up to USF Pro 2000 with VRD, after multiple outings and two wins in USF2000 since 2020. TJ Speed Motorsport saw both Bryce Aron and Francesco Pizzi depart after their outing at the Freedom 90. FR Americas driver Cooper Becklin took over the No. 27 car, while the No. 28 car was not fielded. Logan Adams and Comet/NCMP Racing rejoined the grid at Road America, as did Arturo Flores for BN Racing.

In the days leading up to the Grand Prix of Mid-Ohio, BN Racing announced a new signing in Alessandro de Tullio, who came fourth in USF Juniors in 2022 and stepped into the car previously piloted by Arturo Flores. Charles Finelli left the championship ahead of the weekend.

Multiple drivers ended their season early ahead of the Grand Prix of Toronto. Braden Eves, who had already announced difficulties concerning his budget ahead of Mid-Ohio, was among them, meaning Exclusive Autosport did not field any drivers. Nico Christodoulou did not attend his home event, he was replaced by returnee Shawn Rashid in the No. 32 VRD car. Christian Brooks, who initially confirmed he would finish his campaign despite his Indy NXT commitment, was replaced by GT driver Glenn van Berlo. Nicolás Baptiste (BN Racing) and Ethan Ho (Turn 3 Motorsport) were also absent.

DEForce Racing's Mac Clark and Comet/NCMP Racing's Logan Adams were not on the grid for the Grand Prix of Portland. While Shawn Rashid also did not attend the season finale, VRD instead brought another driver over from its sister GB3 operation to make his series debut in Noah Ping. JHDD also welcomed a series debutant in its USF2000 driver Tanner DeFabis.

== Schedule ==
The 2024 schedule was revealed on October 31, 2023. It featured two street circuits, five road courses and one oval round, one event less than the year before. The round at Sebring International Raceway was dropped in favor of a triple-header at NOLA Motorsports Park, the first time the championship returned there since the 2015 Pro Mazda Championship. The round at Circuit of the Americas was also dropped, while the rounds at Indianapolis Motor Speedway and Road America were made into triple-headers to keep the race tally at 18. All rounds except the weekends at NOLA and Indianapolis Raceway Park supported IndyCar.

Rd.	Date	Race name	Track	Location
1	March 8–10	Foundation Building Materials Grand Prix of St. Petersburg	R Streets of St. Petersburg	St. Petersburg, Florida
2	March 8–10	Foundation Building Materials Grand Prix of St. Petersburg	R Streets of St. Petersburg	St. Petersburg, Florida
3	April 5–7	Continental Tire Grand Prix of Louisiana	R NOLA Motorsports Park	Avondale, Louisiana
4	April 5–7	Continental Tire Grand Prix of Louisiana	R NOLA Motorsports Park	Avondale, Louisiana
5	April 5–7	Continental Tire Grand Prix of Louisiana	R NOLA Motorsports Park	Avondale, Louisiana
6	May 9–11	VP Racing Grand Prix of Indianapolis	R Indianapolis Motor Speedway Road Course	Speedway, Indiana
7	May 9–11	VP Racing Grand Prix of Indianapolis	R Indianapolis Motor Speedway Road Course	Speedway, Indiana
8	May 9–11	VP Racing Grand Prix of Indianapolis	R Indianapolis Motor Speedway Road Course	Speedway, Indiana
9	May 23–25	Continental Tire Freedom 90	O Lucas Oil Indianapolis Raceway Park	Brownsburg, Indiana
10	June 6–9	Elite Engines Grand Prix of Road America	R Road America	Elkhart Lake, Wisconsin
11	June 6–9	Elite Engines Grand Prix of Road America	R Road America	Elkhart Lake, Wisconsin
12	June 6–9	Elite Engines Grand Prix of Road America	R Road America	Elkhart Lake, Wisconsin
13	July 4–7	Tatuus Grand Prix of Mid-Ohio	R Mid-Ohio Sports Car Course	Lexington, Ohio
14	July 4–7	Tatuus Grand Prix of Mid-Ohio	R Mid-Ohio Sports Car Course	Lexington, Ohio
15	July 19–21	Continental Tire Grand Prix of Toronto	R Exhibition Place	Toronto, Ontario
16	July 19–21	Continental Tire Grand Prix of Toronto	R Exhibition Place	Toronto, Ontario
17	August 22–25	Continental Tire Grand Prix of Portland	R Portland International Raceway	Portland, Oregon
18	August 22–25	Continental Tire Grand Prix of Portland	R Portland International Raceway	Portland, Oregon

== Race results ==
Rd.	Track	Pole position	Fastest lap	Most laps led	Race winner	
Rd.	Track	Pole position	Fastest lap	Most laps led	Driver	Team
1	(United States) Streets of St. Petersburg	(Australia) Lochie Hughes	(United States) Nikita Johnson	(Australia) Lochie Hughes	(Australia) Lochie Hughes	Turn 3 Motorsport
2	(United States) Streets of St. Petersburg	(Australia) Lochie Hughes	(United States) Nikita Johnson	(Australia) Lochie Hughes	(United States) Nikita Johnson	Velocity Racing Development
3	(United States) NOLA Motorsports Park	(United States) Jace Denmark	(United States) Nikita Johnson	(United States) Hunter Yeany	(United States) Hunter Yeany	TJ Speed Motorsports
4	(United States) NOLA Motorsports Park	(United States) Hunter Yeany	(United States) Nikita Johnson	(United States) Hunter Yeany	(United States) Nikita Johnson	Velocity Racing Development
5	(United States) NOLA Motorsports Park	(United States) Nikita Johnson	(United States) Nikita Johnson	(United States) Nikita Johnson	(United States) Nikita Johnson	Velocity Racing Development
6	(United States) Indianapolis Motor Speedway Road Course	(United States) Nikita Johnson	(United States) Nikita Johnson	(United States) Nikita Johnson	(United States) Nikita Johnson	Velocity Racing Development
7	(United States) Indianapolis Motor Speedway Road Course	(United States) Nikita Johnson	(United States) Simon Sikes (Note: Nikita Johnson took the fastest lap, led the most laps and won the race, but was disqualified for a technical infringement. Sceats and Sikes inherited the win and the bonus points.)	(New Zealand) Liam Sceats	(New Zealand) Liam Sceats	TJ Speed Motorsports
8	(United States) Indianapolis Motor Speedway Road Course	(United States) Nikita Johnson	(United States) Nikita Johnson	(United States) Nikita Johnson	(United States) Simon Sikes	Pabst Racing
9	(United States) Lucas Oil Indianapolis Raceway Park	(United States) Braden Eves	(United States) Braden Eves	(United States) Braden Eves	(United States) Braden Eves	Exclusive Autosport
10	(United States) Road America	(Australia) Lochie Hughes	(United States) Frankie Mossman	(Australia) Lochie Hughes	(Australia) Lochie Hughes	Turn 3 Motorsport
11	(United States) Road America	(United States) Simon Sikes	(Australia) Lochie Hughes	(United States) Simon Sikes	(Australia) Lochie Hughes	Turn 3 Motorsport
12	(United States) Road America	(United States) Christian Brooks	(United States) Simon Sikes	(Australia) Lochie Hughes	(Australia) Lochie Hughes	Turn 3 Motorsport
13	(United States) Mid-Ohio Sports Car Course	(United States) Nikita Johnson	(United States) Simon Sikes	(United States) Nikita Johnson	(United States) Nikita Johnson	Velocity Racing Development
14	(United States) Mid-Ohio Sports Car Course	(United States) Simon Sikes	(United States) Nikita Johnson	(United States) Nikita Johnson	(United States) Nikita Johnson	Velocity Racing Development
15	(Canada) Exhibition Place	(United States) Danny Dyszelski	(United States) Jace Denmark	(United States) Simon Sikes	(United States) Simon Sikes	Pabst Racing
16	(Canada) Exhibition Place	(Australia) Lochie Hughes	(Australia) Lochie Hughes	(Australia) Lochie Hughes	(Australia) Lochie Hughes	Turn 3 Motorsport
17	(United States) Portland International Raceway	(United States) Nikita Johnson	(United States) Simon Sikes	(United States) Nikita Johnson	(United States) Nikita Johnson	Velocity Racing Development
18	(United States) Portland International Raceway	(United States) Nikita Johnson	(Australia) Lochie Hughes	(United States) Nikita Johnson	(United States) Nikita Johnson	Velocity Racing Development

== Season report ==
=== First half ===
The 2024 USF Pro 2000 Championship kicked off around the Streets of St. Petersburg with Turn 3’s Lochie Hughes taking pole position. He held his lead after an initially aborted start. Seven drivers fell victim to the narrow course across the race, but Hughes managed multiple restarts to secure the win on his series debut, with Pabst’s Christian Brooks and TJ Speed’s Liam Sceats right behind him. Hughes also started the second race from pole, with the opening of the race much the same as the day before. VRD’s Nikita Johnson was able to climb from fourth to second in the opening phase and began pressuring Hughes. The Australian initially held on, but on lap 20 Johnson took the lead on a restart and led Hughes and his teammate Danny Dyszelski home. Still, Hughes left Florida as the championship leader.

The second weekend of the season was held at NOLA, and Pabst’s Jace Denmark and TJ Speed’s Hunter Yeany shared pole positions. Race one began with Yeany taking the lead, never to look back. Through multiple incidents, Johnson used the ensuing restarts to climb from seventh to third, before a three-car crash caused a red flag. That set up a dash to the finish, where Johnson also moved past Denmark. The second race saw Johnson continue right where he left off: starting fifth, he quickly moved into second after an early caution. Polesitter Yeany initially built a gap as BN Racing’s Nicolás Baptiste held off Johnson, before the American was able to move past He took the lead on lap 11 and continued to win the race. Baptiste fell to fifth, allowing Pabst’s Simon Sikes onto the podium. Race three had Johnson starting from pole position, so he did not have to make up any positions to take the lead. He controlled Denmark and Yeany behind him in a largely processional race where the top five all finished where they started. Championship leader Hughes had a horrible weekend, retiring from the first two races and dropping to sixth. Johnson’s two wins handed him a 40-point standings lead over Yeany.

Another triple-header followed at Indianapolis, and this time Johnson was unbeatable in qualifying. Sceats overtook him at the start of the first race, but Johnson retook the lead straight away a lap later. Sceats then dropped behind Hughes shortly before a caution was called. Hughes also found no way to deny Johnson his third win in a row, before then falling back to third when Sceats repassed him. The second race played out much the same - Johnson started on pole position, lost the lead to Sceats, retook it on lap four and led every lap thereafter.Hughes, in third again, made no attempt to move into second past Sceats this time, instead opting to settle for third. Race three, again started on pole position by Johnson, saw Hughes take the lead into the first turn. Johnson moved back into first place, with Hughes also losing out to Sikes the lap after. This time, Johnson was unable to gap the field: Sikes held on to him through the race, and on lap 20 made his move to take the win. Three days later, Johnson was disqualified from race two and docked 20 points for a technical infringement after rival teams raised concerns about his car having a power advantage. This decreased Johnson’s points lead over Yeany to 24.

Up next was the season’s only oval race at IRP. Exclusive Autosport’s Braden Eves was the man to beat all weekend, fastest in all test sessions and also in qualifying. Heavy rain saw the race postponed by a day, but when the green flag was waved, Eves immediately took off and led every lap until he won the race. Denmark came home second and Hughes in third. That catapulted him straight into second in the standings, just a single point behind Johnson, who did not finish after crashing his car into turn three.

=== Second half ===
Teams and drivers then traveled to Road America, where Hughes, Sikes and Brooks claimed pole positions. The opening race saw Hughes initially lose his pole position to Sikes before reclaiming it two laps later. Hughes then had to fend off JHDD’s Frankie Mossmann, who had moved past Sikes. On the final lap Sikes tried retaking second, but went off track and beached his car, handing BN Racing’s Ricardo Escotto a podium. Race two started with a caution, before Brooks and Sikes started battling for the lead. Hughes, starting in third, picked off Brooks to claim second before another caution. He attacked Sikes at the restart, pressuring him until lap 11 when he took the lead. Sikes dropped down the order afterwards, allowing Sceats onto the podium. The weekend’s final race saw Brooks hold on to the lead, while Hughes quickly got past Sikes into second. After initially fending off the Australian, Brooks had to give up first place on a restart on lap six. The top two remained unchanged from then on, while Sikes gradually dropped down the field. Hughes triple win saw him amass a 50-point lead over Denmark, while Johnson dropped to third after a mediocre weekend without a top-five finish.

Mid-Ohio hosted rounds 13 and 14, and Johnson and Sikes shared pole positions for the races. Race one was a straightforward affair for poleman Johnson, with the only hiccup of his flag-to-flag victory coming before the green when the start had to be aborted. Denmark and Brooks completed the podium behind him after a similarly trouble-free race. The second race saw Johnson on top once again: He started fourth, took third from Brooks on lap four and then made two quick moves on a restart to overtake Denmark and Sikes. A multi-car incident then took out Brooks and sent Sikes and Hughes down the order. This allowed Dyszelski onto the podium. Johnson’s double win allowed him to close his gap to Hughes to 26 points, with the latter able to salvage a seventh place in the second race despite his earlier crash.

The penultimate weekend of the season, around Exhibition Place in Toronto, had Dyszelski and Hughes share pole positions. The first race started disastrous for both title contenders: Dsyzelski and Hughes collided, with Hughes forced to pit and Sikes getting past both into the lead, while Johnson drove into the back of Sceats and ended his race in the barriers. Sikes led Denmark and Escotto home, while Hughes had a remarkable climb back up the order that ended in fifth. Race two was much more straightforward for Hughes, as he drove a faultless flag-to-flag race ahead of Sceats and Denmark. Multiple caution periods interrupted proceedings, with only eleven cars finishing the race. Johnson was among the retirees after a spin, completing his awful weekend that saw him fall to third in the standings. Hughes now led by 35 points ahead of Denmark.

The final two rounds of 2024 at Portland both began with Johnson on pole position. The first race was held in slippery conditions, with multiple drivers retiring before even reaching the first turn. Hughes dropped down the order on the subsequent restart while Mossman swept into second. He set off to catch Johnson, but was unable to pass him before being overtaken by Sikes. Hughes, under pressure late in the race, held on to sixth place by 0.2 seconds to win the championship. Johnson had to fend off Hughes at the beginning of race two, but was unchallenged afterwards to end the season with a flag-to-flag victory. The top four ran largely processional, with the only change in that group being Sikes taking third from Denmark on lap 26. In the final standings, Johnson’s two wins lifted him back to second place ahead of Denmark, with Hughes’ gap at 40 points.

The final points table meant that without his disqualification and subsequent points deduction, Johnson would have won the 2024 championship. This penalty being the deciding factor in the championship showed how close Johnson and Hughes were throughout the season. Both had difficult phases, Johnson after his disqualification and Hughes at NOLA, but both also dominated their fair share of races. Johnson won the same amount of races before and after his disqualification, so the performance advantage he was accused of was not all that apparent, but his car clearly violated the technical regulations, so the disqualification was never in question.

== Championship standings ==
=== Drivers' Championship ===
Scoring system

Position	**1st**	**2nd**	**3rd**	**4th**	**5th**	**6th**	**7th**	**8th**	**9th**	**10th**	**11th**	**12th**	**13th**	**14th**	**15th**	**16th**	**17th**	**18th**	**19th**	**20th+**
Points	30	25	22	19	17	15	14	13	12	11	10	9	8	7	6	5	4	3	2	1
Points (O)	45	38	33	29	26	23	21	20	18	17	15	14	12	11	9	8	6	5	3	2

- The driver who qualified on pole was awarded one additional point.
- One point was awarded to the driver who led the most laps in a race.
- One point was awarded to the driver who set the fastest lap during the race.

Pos	Driver	STP		NOL			IMS			IRP	ROA			MOH		TOR		POR		Points
1	(Australia) Lochie Hughes	**1***	**2***	19	18	10	3	2	3	3	**1***	1	1*	4	7	5	**1***	6	2	395
2	(United States) Nikita Johnson	4	1	2	1	**1***	**1***	**DSQ**	**2***	17	7	13	6	**1***	1*	17	12	**1***	**1***	355
3	(United States) Jace Denmark	20	7	**3**	7	2	12	3	6	2	4	4	3	2	2	2	3	14	4	345
4	(United States) Simon Sikes	21	11	10	3	4	7	15	1	15	20	**17***	5	5	**8**	1*	8	2	3	272
5	(New Zealand) Liam Sceats	3	6	18	8	11	2	1*	5	9	8	3	8	14	19	16	2	15	12	256
6	(United States) Christian Brooks	2	5	8	10	7	8	5	7	11	5	2	**2**	3	18					232
7	(United States) Danny Dyszelski	19	3	4	19	8	11	7	19	4	6	5	4	18	3	**13**	16	7	8	230
8	(United States) Frankie Mossman	8	4	9	11	9	19	10	8	8	2	19	19	7	20	8	6	3	6	222
9	(Mexico) Ricardo Escotto	16	17	7	6	6	4	12	9	14	3	15	17	9	5	3	17	4	13	218
10	(Mexico) Jorge Garciarce	11	10	13	9	14	10	16	12	10	9	7	10	8	15	7	5	13	7	199
11	(Canada) Mac Clark	6	9	5	4	5	21	18	21	6	10	20	15	6	9	6	4			187
12	(United States) Braden Eves	5	8	12	16	16	18	4	11	**1***	15	6	14	12	17					170
13	(Brazil) Nicholas Monteiro	12	15	16	15	17	13	8	16	12	11	11	9	17	11	10	7	11	10	162
14	(United States) Hunter Yeany	7	13	1*	**2***	3	5	11	4											148
15	(Colombia) Nicolás Baptiste	9	18	6	5	12	6	6	10	7	18	16	11	19	16					143
16	(United States) Logan Adams	13	12	14	14	18	16	DNS	14		12	8	20	16	4	11	10			114
17	(United States) Tyke Durst	17	16	11	17	19	17	17	20	13	14	10	18	20	13	12	14	12	15	107
18	(United States) Cooper Becklin										13	9	12	15	12	9	9	10	11	90
19	(United States) Ethan Ho	10	20	20	12	13	20	9	13	16	16	21	DNS	13	14					80
20	(United States) Alessandro de Tullio													11	10	4	15	8	14	66
21	(Republic of Ireland) Adam Fitzgerald	15	14	17	13	15	9	19	15											51
22	(Netherlands) Glenn van Berlo															15	11	5	5	50
23	(Canada) Nico Christodoulou										21	14	7	10	6					48
24	(Mexico) Arturo Flores						15	13	17		17	12	13							39
25	(United States) Charles Finelli						14	14	18	DNS	19	18	16							27
26	(United States) Bryce Aron									5										26
27	(United States) Shawn Rashid	18	21	Wth	Wth	Wth										14	13			19
28=	(United States) Tanner DeFabis																	9	16	17
28=	(United States) Noah Ping																	16	9	17
30	(United States) Avery Towns	14	19																	9
31	(United States) David Morales	22	DNS	15	DNS	DNS														7
32	(Italy) Francesco Pizzi									18										5
Pos	Driver	STP		NOL			IMS			IRP	ROA			MOH		TOR		POR		Points

Color	Result
Gold	Winner
Silver	2nd place
Bronze	3rd place
Green	4th & 5th place
Light Blue	6th–10th place
Dark Blue	Finished (Outside Top 10)
Purple	Did not finish
Red	Did not qualify (DNQ)
Brown	Withdrawn (Wth)
Black	Disqualified (DSQ)
White	Did not start (DNS)
Blank	Did not participate

**In-line notation**
**Bold**	Pole position (1 point)
Italics	Ran fastest race lap (1 point)
*	Led most race laps (1 point); Not awarded if more than one driver led most laps
Rookie

=== Teams' championship ===
Scoring system

Position	**1st**	**2nd**	**3rd**	**4th**	**5th**	**6th**	**7th**	**8th**	**9th**	**10th+**
Points	22	18	15	12	10	8	6	4	2	1

- Single car teams received 3 bonus points as an equivalency to multi-car teams
- Only the best two results counted for teams fielding more than two entries

Pos	Team	STP		NOL			IMS			IRP	ROA			MOH		TOR		POR		Points
1	Pabst Racing	2	5	3	3	2	7	3	1	2	4	2	2	2	2	1	3	2	3	445
1	Pabst Racing	16	7	8	7	4	8	5	6	11	5	4	3	3	8	2	7	5	4	445
2	Turn 3 Motorsport	1	2	4	11	7	3	2	3	3	1	1	1	4	3	6	1	6	2	365
2	Turn 3 Motorsport	10	3	10	12	9	9	7	12	4	6	5	4	12	7	11	12	7	7	365
3	Velocity Racing Development	4	1	2	1	1	1	DSQ	2	13	7	12	5	1	1	12	10	1	1	241
3	Velocity Racing Development	15	16	15	15	15					16	13	6	9	6	14	11	14	8	241
4	TJ Speed Motorsports	3	6	1	2	3	2	1	4	5	8	3	7	13	12	9	2	10	10	238
4	TJ Speed Motorsports	7	12	14	8	10	5	10	5	9	12	9	11	14	14	13	8	13	11	238
5	BN Racing	9	13	6	5	6	4	6	8	7	3	11	10	8	5	3	13	4	12	171
5	BN Racing	14	14	7	6	11	6	11	9	12	14	14	12	10	10	4	14	8	13	171
6	Jay Howard Driver Development	8	4	9	10	8	15	9	7	8	2	16	15	6	15	8	6	3	5	153
6	Jay Howard Driver Development																	9	14	153
7	DEForce Racing	6	9	5	4	5	10	8	11	6	9	7	8	5	9	5	4	11	6	149
7	DEForce Racing	11	10	12	9	12	11	13	14	10	10	10	9	7	11	7	5	12	9	149
8	Exclusive Autosport	5	8	11	14	13	14	4	10	1	13	6	13	11	13					103
8	Exclusive Autosport	13	15																	103
9	Comet/NCMP Racing	12	11	13	13	14	13	DNS	13		11	8	16	15	4	10	9			71
10	FatBoy Racing!						12	12	15	DNS	15	15	14							24
Pos	Team	STP		NOL			IMS			IRP	ROA			MOH		TOR		POR		Points

== See also ==
- 2024 IndyCar Series
- 2024 Indy NXT
- 2024 USF2000 Championship
- 2024 USF Juniors
