= Ricardo Escotto =

Mexican racing driver (born 2004)

- Nationality: (Mexico) Mexican
- Born: Ricardo Escotto Lechuga; 14 December 2004 (age 21); Mexico City, Mexico

Indy NXT career
- Debut season: 2024
- Current team: Juncos Hollinger Racing
- Car number: 3
- Former teams: Andretti Cape Indy NXT
- Starts: 24
- Championships: 0
- Wins: 0
- Podiums: 0
- Poles: 0
- Fastest laps: 0
- Best finish: 23rd in 2024

Previous series
- 2022 2022 2022: F4 UAE; F4 Spanish; Italian F4

Ricardo Escotto Lechuga (born 14 December 2004) is a Mexican racing driver who last competed in FIA Formula 3 for AIX Racing.

== Career ==
=== Formula 4 UAE Championship ===
Following a three-year hiatus from racing, Escotto signed with Cram – Hitech GP to compete in the 2022 Formula 4 UAE Championship. He had a difficult season with no points and finishing 25th in the standings.

=== F4 Spanish Championship ===
For the 2022 season, Escotto Joined Cram-Pinnacle to compete full-time in the 2022 F4 Spanish Championship. He had a best result of ninth twice at Aragón and finished 22nd in the championship.

=== Italian F4 Championship ===
Alongside his campaign in the F4 Spanish Championship, Escotto competed in select rounds of the 2022 Italian F4 Championship with Cram Motorsport.

=== USF Pro 2000 Championship ===
==== 2023 ====
For 2023, Escotto made the switch to America, competing in the 2023 USF Pro 2000 Championship with Jay Howard Driver Development. He would get his first win in the championship at Indianapolis, finishing ahead of his teammate Reece Ushijima. Escotto wouldn't finish on the podium again in the remainder of the season, and finished thirteenth in the standings.

==== 2024 ====
Escotto returned for the 2024 season, switching teams to BN Racing. He would have a more successful season, finishing on the podium twice at Road America and Toronto respectively. Escotto finished ninth in the championship.

=== Indy NXT ===
==== 2024 ====
On May 31, 2024, it was announced that Escotto would make his debut in the Indy NXT series for Juncos Hollinger Racing, where he would drive in five races for the team. He would have his highest result of thirteenth at Laguna Seca and Milwaukee.

==== 2025 ====
For 2025, Escotto moved up to the series full-time for the 2025 season. He signed with Andretti Cape Indy NXT, becoming an Andretti Global affiliated driver and with the aim of driving for the team for the 2026 season. However, on July 25, Andretti Cape announced that it had parted ways with Escotto ahead of the Laguna Seca double-header.

==== 2026 ====
On January 14, 2026, it was announced that Escotto will return to Indy NXT in 2026 with Juncos Hollinger Racing.

=== FIA Formula 3 ===
In June 2026, Escotto made a cameo appearance in FIA Formula 3 with AIX Racing at the Barcelona round, as a stand-in replacement for an injured Brad Benavides. He reprised his role as replacement driver for the Silverstone and Spa-Francorchamps rounds. He was replaced by Salim Hanna for the Hungary round but was announced to return to the team for the final two rounds of the season in Monza and Madrid. However, he was unable to partake in the latter round after being involved in a road traffic accident.

== Racing record ==
=== Career summary ===
| Season | Series | Team | Races | Wins | Poles | F/Laps | Podiums | Points | Position |
|---|---|---|---|---|---|---|---|---|---|
| 2018–19 | NACAM Formula 4 Championship | FRF Racing | 3 | 0 | 0 | 0 | 0 | 3 | 18th |
| 2022 | Formula 4 UAE Championship | Cram – Hitech GP | 20 | 0 | 0 | 0 | 0 | 0 | 25th |
| 2022 | F4 Spanish Championship | Cram-Pinnacle | 17 | 0 | 0 | 0 | 0 | 4 | 22nd |
| 2022 | Italian F4 Championship | Cram Motorsport | 6 | 0 | 0 | 0 | 0 | 0 | 48th |
| 2023 | USF Pro 2000 Championship | Jay Howard Driver Development | 18 | 1 | 0 | 1 | 1 | 153 | 13th |
| 2024 | USF Pro 2000 Championship | BN Racing | 18 | 0 | 0 | 0 | 2 | 218 | 9th |
| 2024 | Indy NXT | Juncos Hollinger Racing | 5 | 0 | 0 | 0 | 0 | 59 | 23rd |
| 2024 | Euroformula Open Championship | Team Motopark | 3 | 0 | 0 | 0 | 0 | 18 | 13th |
| 2025 | Indy NXT | Andretti Cape Indy NXT | 9 | 0 | 0 | 0 | 0 | 144 | 19th |
| 2026 | Indy NXT | Juncos Hollinger Racing | 10 | 0 | 0 | 0 | 0 | 142 | 24th |
| 2026 | FIA Formula 3 Championship | AIX Racing | 8 | 0 | 0 | 0 | 0 | 0 | 31st |

^{*} Season still in progress.

=== Complete NACAM Formula 4 Championship results ===
(key) (Races in bold indicate pole position) (Races in italics indicate fastest lap)

| Year | Team | 1 | 2 | 3 | 4 | 5 | 6 | 7 | 8 | 9 | 10 | 11 | 12 | 13 | 14 | 15 | 16 | 17 | 18 | 19 | 20 | DC | Points |
|---|---|---|---|---|---|---|---|---|---|---|---|---|---|---|---|---|---|---|---|---|---|---|---|
| 2018-19 | FRF Racing | AHR1; 1 | AHR1; 2 | PUE; 1 | PUE; 2 | PUE; 3 | SLP; 1 | SLP; 2 | SLP; 3 | MTY; 1 | MTY; 2 | MTY; 3 | AGS; 1 | AGS; 2 | AGS; 3 | PUE; 1 | PUE; 2 | PUE; 3 | AHR2; 1; 9 | AHR2; 2; 11 | AHR2; 3; 10 | 18th | 3 |

=== Complete Formula 4 UAE Championship results ===
(key) (Races in bold indicate pole position) (Races in italics indicate fastest lap)

| Year | Team | 1 | 2 | 3 | 4 | 5 | 6 | 7 | 8 | 9 | 10 | 11 | 12 | 13 | 14 | 15 | 16 | 17 | 18 | 19 | 20 | DC | Points |
|---|---|---|---|---|---|---|---|---|---|---|---|---|---|---|---|---|---|---|---|---|---|---|---|
| 2022 | Cram – Hitech GP | YMC1; 1; 13 | YMC1; 2; 16 | YMC1; 3; 14 | YMC1; 4; 15 | DUB1; 1; 18 | DUB1; 2; 16 | DUB1; 3; 23 | DUB1; 4; 18 | DUB2; 1; 14 | DUB2; 2 Ret | DUB2; 3; 14 | DUB2; 4; 14 | DUB3; 1; 16 | DUB3; 2; 18 | DUB3; 3; 19 | DUB3; 4; 11 | YMC2; 1; 17 | YMC2; 2 Ret | YMC2; 3; 16 | YMC2; 4; 25 | 25th | 0 |

=== Complete F4 Spanish Championship results ===
(key) (Races in bold indicate pole position) (Races in italics indicate fastest lap)

| Year | Team | 1 | 2 | 3 | 4 | 5 | 6 | 7 | 8 | 9 | 10 | 11 | 12 | 13 | 14 | 15 | 16 | 17 | 18 | 19 | 20 | 21 | DC | Points |
|---|---|---|---|---|---|---|---|---|---|---|---|---|---|---|---|---|---|---|---|---|---|---|---|---|
| 2022 | Cram-Pinnacle | ALG; 1; 16 | ALG; 2 Ret | ALG; 3; 26 | JER; 1; 20 | JER; 2; 18 | JER; 3; 17 | CRT; 1; 17 | CRT; 2; 25 | CRT; 3 Ret | SPA; 1 Ret | SPA; 2; 15 | SPA; 3 Ret | ARA; 1; 9 | ARA; 2; 12 | ARA; 3; 9 | NAV; 1 Ret | NAV; 2 Ret | NAV; 3 EX | CAT; 1 | CAT; 2 | CAT; 3 | 22nd | 4 |

=== Complete Italian F4 Championship results ===
(key) (Races in bold indicate pole position) (Races in italics indicate fastest lap)

| Year | Team | 1 | 2 | 3 | 4 | 5 | 6 | 7 | 8 | 9 | 10 | 11 | 12 | 13 | 14 | 15 | 16 | 17 | 18 | 19 | 20 | 21 | DC | Points |
|---|---|---|---|---|---|---|---|---|---|---|---|---|---|---|---|---|---|---|---|---|---|---|---|---|
| 2022 | Cram Motorsport | IMO; 1 Ret | IMO; 2; 20 | IMO; 3 Ret | MIS; 1 | MIS; 2 | MIS; 3 | SPA; 1; 28 | SPA; 2; 33† | SPA; 3; 22 | VLL; 1 | VLL; 2 | VLL; 3 | RBR; 1 | RBR; 2 | RBR; 3 | MNZ; 1 | MNZ; 2 | MNZ; 3 | MUG; 1 | MUG; 2 | MUG; 3 | 48th | 0 |

=== Complete Euroformula Open Championship results ===
(key) (Races in bold indicate pole position) (Races in italics indicate fastest lap)

| Year | Team | 1 | 2 | 3 | 4 | 5 | 6 | 7 | 8 | 9 | 10 | 11 | 12 | 13 | 14 | 15 | 16 | 17 | 18 | 19 | 20 | 21 | 22 | 23 | 24 | DC | Points |
|---|---|---|---|---|---|---|---|---|---|---|---|---|---|---|---|---|---|---|---|---|---|---|---|---|---|---|---|
| 2024 | Team Motopark | PRT; 1 | PRT; 2 | PRT; 3 | HOC; 1 | HOC; 2 | HOC; 3 | SPA; 1 | SPA; 2 | SPA; 3 | HUN; 1 | HUN; 2 | HUN; 3 | LEC; 1 | LEC; 2 | LEC; 3 | RBR; 1 | RBR; 2 | RBR; 3 | CAT; 1; 7 | CAT; 2; 7 | CAT; 3; 7 | MNZ; 1 | MNZ; 2 | MNZ; 3 | 13th | 18 |

=== American open–wheel racing results ===
==== USF Pro 2000 Championship ====
(key) (Races in bold indicate pole position) (Races in italics indicate fastest lap) (Races with * indicate most race laps led)

| Year | Team | 1 | 2 | 3 | 4 | 5 | 6 | 7 | 8 | 9 | 10 | 11 | 12 | 13 | 14 | 15 | 16 | 17 | 18 | Rank | Points |
|---|---|---|---|---|---|---|---|---|---|---|---|---|---|---|---|---|---|---|---|---|---|
| 2023 | Jay Howard Driver Development | STP; 1; 15 | STP; 2; 18 | SEB; 1; 18 | SEB; 2; 10 | IMS; 1; 1 | IMS; 2; 17 | IRP; 15 | ROA; 1; 11 | ROA; 2; 9 | MOH; 1; 9 | MOH; 2; 11 | TOR; 1; 13 | TOR; 2; 15 | COTA; 1; 6 | COTA; 1; 18 | POR; 1; 16 | POR; 2 DNS | POR; 3; 16 | 13th | 153 |
| 2024 | BN Racing | STP; 1; 16 | STP; 2; 17 | LOU; 1; 7 | LOU; 2; 6 | LOU; 3; 6 | IMS; 1; 4 | IMS; 2; 12 | IMS; 3; 9 | IRP; 14 | ROA; 1; 3 | ROA; 2; 15 | ROA; 3; 17 | MOH; 1; 9 | MOH; 2; 5 | TOR; 1; 3 | TOR; 2; 17 | POR; 1; 4 | POR; 2; 13 | 9th | 218 |

==== Indy NXT ====
(key) (Races in bold indicate pole position) (Races in italics indicate fastest lap) (Races with ^{L} indicate a race lap led) (Races with * indicate most race laps led)

| Year | Team | 1 | 2 | 3 | 4 | 5 | 6 | 7 | 8 | 9 | 10 | 11 | 12 | 13 | 14 | 15 | 16 | 17 | Rank | Points |
|---|---|---|---|---|---|---|---|---|---|---|---|---|---|---|---|---|---|---|---|---|
| 2024 | Juncos Hollinger Racing | STP | BAR | IMS1 | IMS2 | DET; 21 | RDA | LAG1; 18 | LAG2; 13 | MOH | IOW | GMP | POR; 17 | MIL; 13 | NSH | | | | 23rd | 59 |
| 2025 | Andretti Cape | STP; 10 | BAR; 9 | IMS; 14 | IMS; 16 | DET; 20 | GMP; 13 | RDA; 13 | MOH; 19 | IOW; 13 | LAG | LAG | POR | MIL | NSH | | | | 19th | 144 |
| 2026 | Juncos Hollinger Racing | STP; 13 | ARL; 12 | BAR; 7 | BAR; 17 | IMS; 24 | IMS; 20 | DET; 24 | GAT; 19 | ROA; 14 | ROA; 11 | MOH | MOH | NSS | POR | MIL | LAG | LAG | 24th | 142 |

* Season still in progress.

=== Complete FIA Formula 3 Championship results ===
(key) (Races in bold indicate pole position) (Races in italics indicate fastest lap)

| Year | Entrant | 1 | 2 | 3 | 4 | 5 | 6 | 7 | 8 | 9 | 10 | 11 | 12 | 13 | 14 | 15 | 16 | 17 | 18 | 19 | DC | Points |
|---|---|---|---|---|---|---|---|---|---|---|---|---|---|---|---|---|---|---|---|---|---|---|
| 2026 | AIX Racing | MEL; SPR | MEL; FEA | MON; SPR | MON; FEA | CAT; SPR; 22 | CAT; FEA; 23 | RBR; SPR | RBR; FEA | SIL; SPR; 28 | SIL; FEA; Ret | SPA; SPR; 22 | SPA; FEA; 26 | HUN; SPR | HUN; FEA | MNZ; SPR; 22 | MNZ; FEA; 15 | MAD; SPR | MAD; FEA1 | MAD; FEA2 | 31st | 0 |
