= 2019 Indy Lights =

Indy Lights season

2019 Indy Lights season
- Indy Lights

Season
- Races: 18
- Start date: March 9
- End date: September 22

Awards
- Drivers' champion: (United States) Oliver Askew
- Teams' champion: (United States) Andretti Autosport
- Rookie of the Year: (United States) Oliver Askew

The 2019 Indy Lights season was the 34th season of the Indy Lights open wheel motor racing series and the 18th sanctioned by IndyCar, acting as the primary support series for the IndyCar Series. Oliver Askew won a tight championship race with Rinus Veekay. Askew won seven races to Veekay's six. Toby Sowery, Robert Megennis, and Ryan Norman each captured a single race win as did Aaron Telitz, who only participated in seven mid-season races, and Zachary Claman, who won the season opener but dropped out of the series after six races due to funding issues. Julien Falchero also dropped out of the season after four races after expected good results failed to materialize. Jarett Andretti made his first and only Indy Lights start in the Freedom 100 and set fastest lap on his way to a sixth place finish. Dalton Kellett moved onto IndyCar after this season despite only registering a single podium finish in 2019 Indy Lights.

The subsequent 2020 Indy Lights season would end up being canceled due to the impact of the COVID-19 pandemic on sports.

== Team and driver chart ==
Team	No.	Drivers	Rounds
Andretti Autosport	18	(United States) Jarett Andretti	7
Andretti Autosport	27	(United States) Robert Megennis	All
Andretti Autosport	28	(United States) Oliver Askew	All
Andretti Autosport	48	(United States) Ryan Norman	All
Belardi Auto Racing	4	(France) Julien Falchero	1–4
Belardi Auto Racing	4	(United States) Aaron Telitz	7–13
Belardi Auto Racing	5	(Brazil) Lucas Kohl	All
Belardi Auto Racing	13	(Canada) Zachary Claman	1–6
Belardi Auto Racing with Jonathan Byrd's Racing	17	(United States) Chris Windom	7
BN Racing Team Pelfrey; HMD Motorsports^{1}	2	(United Kingdom) Toby Sowery	All
BN Racing; HMD Motorsports^{1}	79	(United States) David Malukas	All
Juncos Racing	21	(Netherlands) Rinus VeeKay	All
Juncos Racing	67	(Canada) Dalton Kellett	All

^{1}HMD Motorsports acquired BN Racing's Indy Lights operation in August 2019

== Schedule ==
Rd.	Date	Race name	Track	Location
1	March 9	(United States) St. Petersburg Twin 150k	Streets of St. Petersburg	St. Petersburg, Florida
2	March 10	(United States) St. Petersburg Twin 150k	Streets of St. Petersburg	St. Petersburg, Florida
3	March 23	(United States) Indy Lights Classic	Circuit of the Americas	Austin, Texas
4	March 24	(United States) Indy Lights Classic	Circuit of the Americas	Austin, Texas
5	May 10	(United States) Indy Lights Grand Prix	Indianapolis Motor Speedway road course	Speedway, Indiana
6	May 11	(United States) Indy Lights Grand Prix	Indianapolis Motor Speedway road course	Speedway, Indiana
7	May 24	(United States) Freedom 100	Indianapolis Motor Speedway oval	Speedway, Indiana
8	June 22	(United States) Mazda Grand Prix of Road America	Road America	Elkhart Lake, Wisconsin
9	June 23	(United States) Mazda Grand Prix of Road America	Road America	Elkhart Lake, Wisconsin
10	July 13	(Canada) Grand Prix of Toronto	Exhibition Place	Toronto, Ontario, Canada
11	July 14	(Canada) Grand Prix of Toronto	Exhibition Place	Toronto, Ontario, Canada
12	July 27	(United States) Grand Prix of Mid-Ohio	Mid-Ohio Sports Car Course	Lexington, Ohio
13	July 28	(United States) Grand Prix of Mid-Ohio	Mid-Ohio Sports Car Course	Lexington, Ohio
14	August 24	(United States) Illinois 250k	Gateway Motorsports Park	Madison, Illinois
15	August 31	(United States) Grand Prix of Portland	Portland International Raceway	Portland, Oregon
16	September 1	(United States) Grand Prix of Portland	Portland International Raceway	Portland, Oregon
17	September 21	(United States) Monterey Grand Prix	WeatherTech Raceway Laguna Seca	Monterey, California
18	September 22	(United States) Monterey Grand Prix	WeatherTech Raceway Laguna Seca	Monterey, California

== Race results ==
Round	Race	Pole position	Fastest lap	Most laps led	Race Winner	
Round	Race	Pole position	Fastest lap	Most laps led	Driver	Team
1	St. Petersburg 1	(Canada) Zachary Claman	(Canada) Zachary Claman	(Canada) Zachary Claman	(Canada) Zachary Claman	Belardi Auto Racing
2	St. Petersburg 2	(United States) Oliver Askew	(United States) Robert Megennis	(Netherlands) Rinus VeeKay	(Netherlands) Rinus VeeKay	Juncos Racing
3	Austin 1	(United States) Oliver Askew	(United States) Oliver Askew	(United States) Oliver Askew	(United States) Oliver Askew	Andretti Autosport
4	Austin 2	(United States) Oliver Askew	(United States) Robert Megennis	(United States) Oliver Askew	(United States) Oliver Askew	Andretti Autosport
5	Indianapolis GP 1	(United States) Robert Megennis	(United States) Oliver Askew	(United States) Robert Megennis	(United States) Robert Megennis	Andretti Autosport
6	Indianapolis GP 2	(Netherlands) Rinus VeeKay	(Netherlands) Rinus VeeKay	(Netherlands) Rinus VeeKay	(Netherlands) Rinus VeeKay	Juncos Racing
7	Freedom 100	(United States) Robert Megennis	(United States) Jarett Andretti	(United States) Ryan Norman	(United States) Oliver Askew	Andretti Autosport
8	Road America 1	(Netherlands) Rinus VeeKay	(Netherlands) Rinus VeeKay	(United States) Ryan Norman	(United States) Ryan Norman	Andretti Autosport
9	Road America 2	(Netherlands) Rinus VeeKay	(Netherlands) Rinus VeeKay	(Netherlands) Rinus VeeKay	(Netherlands) Rinus VeeKay	Juncos Racing
10	Toronto 1	(United States) Aaron Telitz	(United States) Aaron Telitz	(United States) Aaron Telitz	(United States) Aaron Telitz	Belardi Auto Racing
11	Toronto 2	(United States) Oliver Askew	(United States) Aaron Telitz	(United States) Aaron Telitz	(United States) Oliver Askew	Andretti Autosport
12	Mid-Ohio 1	(United States) Oliver Askew	(United States) Oliver Askew	(United States) Oliver Askew	(United States) Oliver Askew	Andretti Autosport
13	Mid-Ohio 2	(United States) Oliver Askew	(United States) Oliver Askew	(United States) Oliver Askew	(United States) Oliver Askew	Andretti Autosport
14	Gateway	(United States) Oliver Askew	(United States) Oliver Askew	(Netherlands) Rinus VeeKay	(United States) Oliver Askew	Andretti Autosport
15	Portland 1	(Netherlands) Rinus VeeKay	(United Kingdom) Toby Sowery	(Netherlands) Rinus VeeKay	(Netherlands) Rinus VeeKay	Juncos Racing
16	Portland 2	(Netherlands) Rinus VeeKay	(Netherlands) Rinus VeeKay	(United Kingdom) Toby Sowery	(United Kingdom) Toby Sowery	HMD Motorsports/Team Pelfrey
17	Laguna Seca 1	(Netherlands) Rinus VeeKay	(Netherlands) Rinus VeeKay	(Netherlands) Rinus VeeKay	(Netherlands) Rinus VeeKay	Juncos Racing
18	Laguna Seca 2	(Netherlands) Rinus VeeKay	(Netherlands) Rinus VeeKay	(Netherlands) Rinus VeeKay	(Netherlands) Rinus VeeKay	Juncos Racing

== Championship standings ==
=== Drivers' Championship ===
Scoring system

Position	**1st**	**2nd**	**3rd**	**4th**	**5th**	**6th**	**7th**	**8th**	**9th**	**10th**	**11th**	**12th**	**13th**	**14th**	**15th**	**16th**	**17th**	**18th**	**19th**	**20th**
Points (R)	30	25	22	19	17	15	14	13	12	11	10	9	8	7	6	5	4	3	2	1
Points (O)	45	38	33	29	26	23	21	20	18	17	15	14	12	11	9	8	6	5	4	2

- The driver who qualifies on pole is awarded one additional point.
- An additional point is awarded to the driver who leads the most laps in a race.

Pos	Driver	STP		AUS		IMS		INDY	ROA		TOR		MOH		GMP	POR		LAG		Points
1	(United States) Oliver Askew RY	3	**10**	**1***	**1***	2	3	1	5	3	2	**1**	**1***	**1***	**1**	2	3	4	2	486
2	(Netherlands) Rinus VeeKay R	5	1*	2	4	3	**1***	3	**7**	**1***	3	9	3	3	2*	**1***	**2**	**1***	**1***	465
3	(United Kingdom) Toby Sowery R	2	3	5	6	7	5	4	4	8	5	2	9	2	8	4	1*	2	3	367
4	(United States) Ryan Norman	7	6	6	8	4	8	2*	1*	2	4	4	2	4	4	7	4	7	5	359
5	(United States) Robert Megennis R	6	9	3	2	**1***	4	**8**	2	6	6	5	4	9	5	3	5	3	4	355
6	(United States) David Malukas R	4	4	10	3	6	6	11	6	4	9	8	5	5	3	6	8	5	7	301
7	(Canada) Dalton Kellett	10	8	9	9	8	7	5	8	7	8	3	7	8	6	5	6	6	6	275
8	(Brazil) Lucas Kohl R	9	7	8	7	9	9	7	9	9	7	7	6	7	7	8	7	8	8	253
9	(United States) Aaron Telitz							9	3	5	**1***	6*	8	6						133
10	(Canada) Zachary Claman	**1***	2	7	10	5	2													124
11	(France) Julien Falchero R	8	5	4	5															66
12	(United States) Jarett Andretti R							6												23
13	(United States) Chris Windom R							10												17
Pos	Driver	STP		AUS		IMS		INDY	ROA		TOR		MOH		GMP	POR		LAG		Points

Color	Result
Gold	Winner
Silver	2nd place
Bronze	3rd place
Green	4th & 5th place
Light Blue	6th–10th place
Dark Blue	Finished (Outside Top 10)
Purple	Did not finish
Red	Did not qualify (DNQ)
Brown	Withdrawn (Wth)
Black	Disqualified (DSQ)
White	Did not start (DNS)
Blank	Did not participate (DNP)
Blank	Not competing

**In-line notation**
**Bold**	Pole position (1 point)
Italics	Ran fastest race lap
*	Led most race laps (1 point)
^{1}	Qualifying cancelled no bonus point awarded
R	Rookie
RY	Rookie of the Year

- Ties in points broken by number of wins, or best finishes.

=== Teams' championship ===
Scoring system

Position	**1st**	**2nd**	**3rd**	**4th**	**5th**	**6th**	**7th**	**8th**	**9th**	**10th+**
Points	22	18	15	12	10	8	6	4	2	1

- Single car teams receive 3 bonus points as an equivalency to multi-car teams
- Only the best two results count for teams fielding more than two entries

Pos	Team	Points
1	Andretti Autosport	581
2	Juncos Racing	432
3	BN Racing/HMD Motorsports	388
4	Belardi Auto Racing	304

== See also ==
- 2019 IndyCar Series
- 2019 Indy Pro 2000 Championship
- 2019 U.S. F2000 National Championship
