= BN Racing =

American racing team

(United States) BN Racing
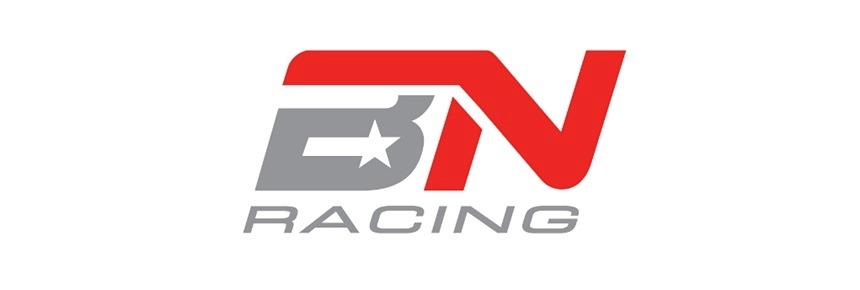
- Founded: 2007
- Base: Florida
- Team principal(s): Bryn Nuttall
- Current series: USF Pro 2000 Championship
- Former series: Indy NXT; USF2000 Championship
- Current drivers: 74. (Colombia) Nicolás Baptiste; 77. (Mexico) Ricardo Escotto
- Noted drivers: (United States) David Malukas (United Kingdom) Toby Sowery (United Kingdom) Jamie Caroline
- Website: https://www.bn-racing.com/racing/

BN Racing is an American racing team currently competing in the USF Pro 2000 Championship. The team is owned by Bryn Nuttall. The team currently fields the No. 74 for Nicolás Baptiste and the No. 77 for Ricardo Escotto in the 2024 USF Pro 2000 Championship.

== USF Pro Championships (2017–present) ==
=== Indy Lights ===
==== 2019 ====
BN Racing entered the 2019 Indy Lights series. David Malukas ran for the team in 2019 with a limited budget. In August, the team sold off their Indy Lights operation to Malukas' father Henry. Henry Malukas then formed HMD Motorsports as a result.

=== USF2000 Championship ===
The team entered the USF2000 series in 2017 running a limited schedule.

=== USF Pro 2000 Championship ===
==== 2018 ====
Along with USF2000, the team also entered the 2018 Pro Mazda Championship with two cars, and had several wins.

==== 2024 ====
After a 4-year hiatus, owner and team principal Bryn Nuttall announced that the team would make a return to racing by entering into the 2024 USF Pro 2000 Championship. The team signed Columbian Nicolás Baptiste and Mexican Ricardo Escotto to compete full-time for the 2024 season.

== Current series results ==
=== Pro Mazda Championship / Indy Pro 2000 Championship / USF Pro 2000 Championship ===
Year	Car	Drivers	Races	Wins	Poles	F/Laps	Podiums	Points	D.C.	T.C.
2018	Tatuus PM-18	(United States) David Malukas	16	3	3	2	6	302	4th	3rd
2018	Tatuus PM-18	(United States) Charles Finelli	13	0	0	0	0	143	10th	3rd
2018	Tatuus PM-18	(United States) Kris Wright	10	0	0	0	0	110	12th	3rd
2018	Tatuus PM-18	(United Kingdom) Toby Sowery	2	0	0	1	2	51	16th	3rd
2019	Tatuus PM-18	(United Kingdom) Matthew Round-Garrido	4	0	0	0	0	34	17th	10th
2020	Tatuus PM-18	(United States) Jacob Loomis	8	0	1	1	0	76	17th	9th
2020	Tatuus PM-18	(United States) Sabré Cook	5	0	0	0	0	47	19th	9th
2024	Tatuus IP-22	(Mexico) Ricardo Escotto	18	0	0	0	2	218	9th	5th
2024	Tatuus IP-22	(Colombia) Nicolás Baptiste	14	0	0	0	0	143	15th	5th
2024	Tatuus IP-22	(United States) Alessandro de Tullio	6	0	0	0	0	66	20th	5th
2024	Tatuus IP-22	(Mexico) Arturo Flores	6	0	0	0	0	39	24th	5th

* Season still in progress.

== Former series results ==
=== Indy Lights / Indy NXT ===
Year	Car	Drivers	Races	Wins	Poles	F/Laps	Podiums	Points	D.C.	T.C.
2019	Dallara IL-15	(United Kingdom) Toby Sowery	18	1	0	1	7	367	3rd	3rd
2019	Dallara IL-15	(United States) David Malukas	18	0	0	0	2	301	6th	3rd

† Shared results with other teams.

=== U.S. F2000 National Championship ===
Year	Car	Drivers	Races	Wins	Poles	F/Laps	Podiums	Points	D.C.	T.C.
2017	Tatuus USF-17	(United States) David Malukas	9	0	1	0	1	108	10th	?
2017	Tatuus USF-17	(United States) Zach Holden	1	0	0	0	0	1	36th	?
2018	Tatuus USF-17	(Republic of Ireland) Keith Donegan†	12	0	0	0	1	139	9th	7th
2018	Tatuus USF-17	(United States) Russell McDonough	14	0	0	0	0	60	19th	7th
2018	Tatuus USF-17	(United Kingdom) Jamie Caroline	4	0	0	0	0	40	25th	7th
2019	Tatuus USF-17	(United States) Zach Holden	12	0	0	0	2	170	9th	6th
2019	Tatuus USF-17	(United Kingdom) Matthew Round-Garrido†	11	0	0	0	1	122	14th	6th
2019	Tatuus USF-17	(Venezuela) Anthony Famularo	7	0	0	0	0	67	19th	6th

† Shared results with other teams.
