= 2019 Indy Pro 2000 Championship =

The 2019 Indy Pro 2000 championship presented by Cooper Tires was the 21st season in series history. A 16-race schedule was announced on 25 September 2018, featuring five permanent road circuits and two street circuits on the NTT IndyCar Series hosting doubleheaders, and single races at the Dave Steele Classic and World Wide Technology Raceway, a flat intermediate oval. Following the departure of Mazda from the Road to Indy program, it was the first championship run under the new "Indy Pro 2000" name instead of the previous "Pro Mazda Championship."

American Kyle Kirkwood of RP Motorsport won nine of the sixteen races yet still found himself in a close fight for the championship with Swedish driver Rasmus Lindh of Juncos Racing. Lindh won only three times, but fifth or better in every race and only finished off the podium three times. Kirkwood only needed to start the final race to clinch the championship and was knocked out by an incident on the first lap of the final race, leaving the final points margin of victory a scant two points. Canadian Parker Thompson of Abel Motorsports won the opening doubleheader of the season but not again for the rest of the season and finished third in points, well back of Kirkwood and Lindh. Sting Ray Robb captured two poles but was winless and finished fourth in points while Singaporean driver Danial Frost won twice and finished fifth, rounding out the season's winners.

Juncos edged out RP for the Teams' championship by a significant margin despite Lindh losing out on the championship on the back of Robb's strong performance in their second car. RP's second car was piloted by three different drivers who tallied only two podium finishes between them.

== Drivers and teams ==
Team	No.	Drivers	Rounds
Abel Motorsports	8	(Canada) Parker Thompson	All
Abel Motorsports	51	(United States) Jacob Abel	1–5, 8–16
DEForce Racing	6	(Mexico) Moisés de la Vara	All
DEForce Racing	7	(United States) Kory Enders	All
Exclusive Autosport	68	(Singapore) Danial Frost	All
Exclusive Autosport	90	(Russia) Nikita Lastochkin	All
Exclusive Autosport	91	(United States) Parker Locke	1–2
Exclusive Autosport	91	(United States) Phillippe Denes	15–16
FatBoy Racing!	83	(United States) Charles Finelli	1–12, 15–16
FatBoy Racing!	98	(United States) Phillippe Denes	1–11
BN Racing; Jay Howard Driver Development	27	(United Kingdom) Matthew Round-Garrido	13–16
JDL Racing	9	(United States) Jacob Loomis	3–4, 6–7
Juncos Racing	2	(United States) Sting Ray Robb	All
Juncos Racing	10	(Sweden) Rasmus Lindh	All
Pserra Racing; Jay Howard Driver Development	11	(Canada) Antonio Serravalle	1–11
Pserra Racing; RP Motorsport Racing	11	(Canada) Antonio Serravalle	13–16
RP Motorsport Racing	5	(Italy) Damiano Fioravanti	1–2
RP Motorsport Racing	5	(Guatemala) Ian Rodríguez	3–4, 6–11
RP Motorsport Racing	5	(Russia) Artem Petrov	12–16
RP Motorsport Racing	28	(United States) Kyle Kirkwood	All
Turn 3 Motorsport	3	(Canada) Antoine Comeau	10–16

== Schedule ==
Rd.	Date	Race name	Track	Location
1	March 9	(United States) St. Petersburg 100	Streets of St. Petersburg	St. Petersburg, Florida
2	March 10	(United States) St. Petersburg 100	Streets of St. Petersburg	St. Petersburg, Florida
3	May 10	(United States) Grand Prix of Indianapolis	Indianapolis Motor Speedway road course	Speedway, Indiana
4	May 11	(United States) Grand Prix of Indianapolis	Indianapolis Motor Speedway road course	Speedway, Indiana
5	May 24	(United States) Dave Steele Carb Night Classic	Lucas Oil Raceway oval	Clermont, Indiana
6	June 22	(United States) Mazda Grand Prix of Road America	Road America	Elkhart Lake, Wisconsin
7	June 23	(United States) Mazda Grand Prix of Road America	Road America	Elkhart Lake, Wisconsin
8	July 13	(Canada) Grand Prix of Toronto	Exhibition Place	Toronto, Ontario, Canada
9	July 14	(Canada) Grand Prix of Toronto	Exhibition Place	Toronto, Ontario, Canada
10	July 27	(United States) Grand Prix of Mid-Ohio	Mid-Ohio Sports Car Course	Lexington, Ohio
11	July 28	(United States) Grand Prix of Mid-Ohio	Mid-Ohio Sports Car Course	Lexington, Ohio
12	August 24	(United States) Cooper Tires Indy Pro 2000 Oval Challenge of St. Louis	Gateway Motorsports Park	Madison, Illinois
13	August 31	(United States) Grand Prix of Portland	Portland International Raceway	Portland, Oregon
14	September 1	(United States) Grand Prix of Portland	Portland International Raceway	Portland, Oregon
15	September 21	(United States) WeatherTech Raceway Laguna Seca	WeatherTech Raceway Laguna Seca	Monterey, California
16	September 22	(United States) WeatherTech Raceway Laguna Seca	WeatherTech Raceway Laguna Seca	Monterey, California

== Race results ==
Round	Race	Pole position	Fastest lap	Most laps led	Race Winner	
Round	Race	Pole position	Fastest lap	Most laps led	Driver	Team
1	St. Petersburg 1	(Canada) Parker Thompson	(Canada) Parker Thompson	(Sweden) Rasmus Lindh	(Canada) Parker Thompson	Abel Motorsports
2	St. Petersburg 2	(Canada) Parker Thompson	(United States) Kyle Kirkwood	(Canada) Parker Thompson	(Canada) Parker Thompson	Abel Motorsports
3	Indianapolis GP 1	(Sweden) Rasmus Lindh	(United States) Kyle Kirkwood	(Sweden) Rasmus Lindh	(Sweden) Rasmus Lindh	Juncos Racing
4	Indianapolis GP 2	(Sweden) Rasmus Lindh	(United States) Kyle Kirkwood	(Sweden) Rasmus Lindh	(Sweden) Rasmus Lindh	Juncos Racing
5	Dave Steele Classic	(Singapore) Danial Frost	(Singapore) Danial Frost	(Singapore) Danial Frost	(Singapore) Danial Frost	Exclusive Autosport
6	Road America 1	(Canada) Parker Thompson	(Sweden) Rasmus Lindh	(United States) Kyle Kirkwood	(United States) Kyle Kirkwood	RP Motorsport Racing
7	Road America 2	(Sweden) Rasmus Lindh	(Sweden) Rasmus Lindh	(United States) Kyle Kirkwood	(United States) Kyle Kirkwood	RP Motorsport Racing
8	Toronto 1	(United States) Kyle Kirkwood	(Guatemala) Ian Rodríguez	(Singapore) Danial Frost	(Singapore) Danial Frost	Exclusive Autosport
9	Toronto 2	(United States) Kyle Kirkwood	(Sweden) Rasmus Lindh	(United States) Kyle Kirkwood	(United States) Kyle Kirkwood	RP Motorsport Racing
10	Mid-Ohio 1	(United States) Kyle Kirkwood	(United States) Kyle Kirkwood	(United States) Kyle Kirkwood	(United States) Kyle Kirkwood	RP Motorsport Racing
11	Mid-Ohio 2	(United States) Kyle Kirkwood	(United States) Kyle Kirkwood	(United States) Kyle Kirkwood	(United States) Kyle Kirkwood	RP Motorsport Racing
12	Gateway	(Sweden) Rasmus Lindh	(United States) Kory Enders	(United States) Kyle Kirkwood	(United States) Kyle Kirkwood	RP Motorsport Racing
13	Portland 1	(United States) Sting Ray Robb	(United States) Kyle Kirkwood	(United States) Kyle Kirkwood	(United States) Kyle Kirkwood	RP Motorsport Racing
14	Portland 2	(United States) Kyle Kirkwood	(United States) Kyle Kirkwood	(United States) Kyle Kirkwood	(United States) Kyle Kirkwood	RP Motorsport Racing
15	Laguna Seca 1	(United States) Sting Ray Robb	(United States) Sting Ray Robb	(United States) Sting Ray Robb	(United States) Kyle Kirkwood	RP Motorsport Racing
16	Laguna Seca 2	(Sweden) Rasmus Lindh	(Sweden) Rasmus Lindh	(Sweden) Rasmus Lindh	(Sweden) Rasmus Lindh	Juncos Racing

== Championship standings ==
=== Drivers' Championship ===
Scoring system

Position	**1st**	**2nd**	**3rd**	**4th**	**5th**	**6th**	**7th**	**8th**	**9th**	**10th**	**11th**	**12th**	**13th**	**14th**	**15th**	**16th**	**17th**	**18th**	**19th**	**20th**
Points	30	25	22	19	17	15	14	13	12	11	10	9	8	7	6	5	4	3	2	1
Points (O)	45	38	33	29	26	23	21	20	18	17	15	14	12	11	9	8	6	5	4	2

- The driver who qualifies on pole is awarded one additional point.
- One point is awarded to the driver who leads the most laps in a race.
- One point is awarded to the driver who sets the fastest lap during the race.

Pos	Driver	STP		IMS		LOR	ROA		TOR		MOH		GMP	POR		LAG		Points
1	(United States) Kyle Kirkwood	14	2	2	13	4	1*	1*	**8**	**1***	**1***	**1***	1*	1*	**1***	1	14	419
2	(Sweden) Rasmus Lindh	2*	4	**1***	**1***	3	4	**2**	2	3	2	3	**2**	5	3	3	**1***	417
3	(Canada) Parker Thompson	**1**	**1***	5	5	10	**3**	3	3	2	11	4	6	3	4	4	2	344
4	(United States) Sting Ray Robb	3	5	4	2	2	7	10	11	5	5	2	5	**8**	2	**2***	6	323
5	(Singapore) Danial Frost	4	3	3	3	**1***	11	12	1*	4	13	6	4	2	6	6	12	318
6	(Russia) Nikita Lastochkin	5	7	7	4	11	5	5	10	8	4	7	8	6	9	9	13	237
7	(United States) Kory Enders	13	10	8	10	6	9	9	7	9	DNS	DNS	3	11	10	11	3	211
8	(Mexico) Moisés de la Vara	6	6	13	6	7	10	11	13	10	10	13	11	9	11	12	4	198
9	(United States) Jacob Abel	9	11	6	7	5			6	7	12	10	12	7	8	7	5	198
10	(Canada) Antonio Serravalle	7	13	9	9	12	DNS	8	4	13	7	9		4	7	10	8	188
11	(United States) Phillippe Denes	8	8	12	8	8	6	7	9	12	6	8				8	7	173
12	(United States) Charles Finelli	12	DNS	10	14	9	DNS	DNS	12	11	8	12	10			13	11	133
13	(Guatemala) Ian Rodríguez			14	12		2	4	5	6	3	5						132
14	(Canada) Antoine Comeau										9	11	9	12	13	14	9	76
15	(Russia) Artem Petrov												7	10	5	5	15	72
16	(United States) Jacob Loomis			11	11		8	6										48
17	(United Kingdom) Matthew Round-Garrido													13	12	15	10	34
18	(Italy) Damiano Fioravanti	11	9															22
19	(United States) Parker Locke	10	12															20

Color	Result
Gold	Winner
Silver	2nd place
Bronze	3rd place
Green	4th & 5th place
Light Blue	6th–10th place
Dark Blue	Finished (Outside Top 10)
Purple	Did not finish
Red	Did not qualify (DNQ)
Brown	Withdrawn (Wth)
Black	Disqualified (DSQ)
White	Did not start (DNS)
Blank	Did not participate

**In-line notation**
**Bold**	Pole position (1 point)
Italics	Ran fastest race lap (1 point)
*	Led most race laps (1 point); Not awarded if more than one driver leads most laps
Rookie

=== Teams' championship ===
Scoring system

Position	**1st**	**2nd**	**3rd**	**4th**	**5th**	**6th**	**7th**	**8th**	**9th**	**10th+**
Points	22	18	15	12	10	8	6	4	2	1

- Single car teams receive 3 bonus points as an equivalency to multi-car teams
- Only the best two results count for teams fielding more than two entries

Pos	Team	Points
1	Juncos Racing	442
2	RP Motorsport Racing	362
3	Abel Motorsports	282
4	Exclusive Autosport	273
5	DEForce Racing	116
6	Pserra Racing; Jay Howard Driver Development	105
7	FatBoy Racing!	73
8	Turn 3 Motorsport	31
9	JDL Racing	26
10	BN Racing; Jay Howard Driver Development	16

== See also ==
- 2019 IndyCar Series
- 2019 Indy Lights
- 2019 U.S. F2000 National Championship
