= Nicolás Baptiste =

Colombian racing driver (born 2005)

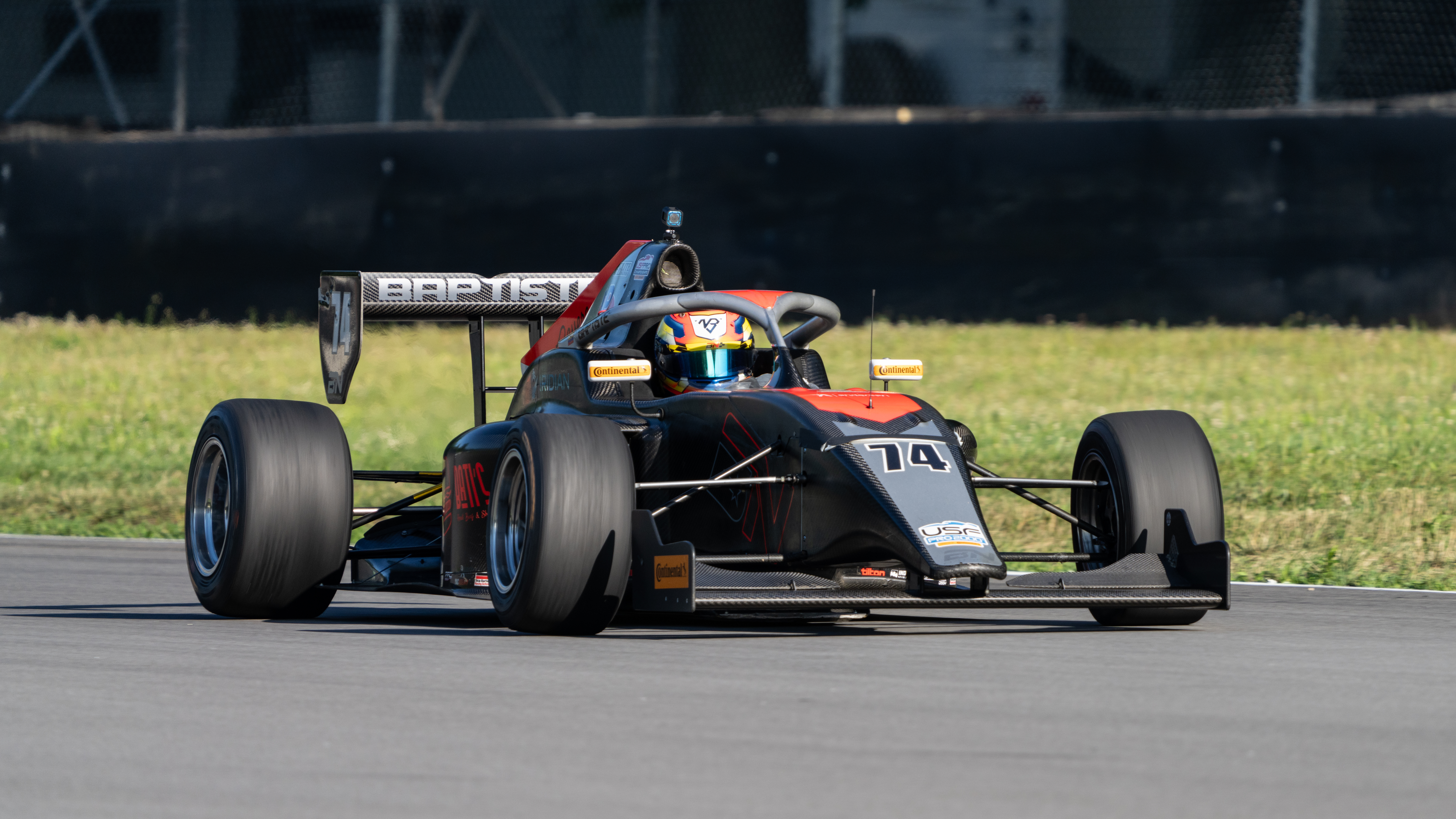
- Baptiste at the Mid-Ohio Sports Car Course in 2024
- Nationality: (Colombia) Colombian
- Born: 31 October 2005 (age 21) Bogotà, Colombia

USF Pro 2000 Championship career
- Debut season: 2024
- Current team: BN Racing
- Categorisation: FIA Silver
- Car number: 74
- Starts: 14 (14 entries)
- Wins: 0
- Podiums: 0
- Poles: 0
- Fastest laps: 0
- Best finish: 15th in 2024

Previous series
- 2022 2020–2021 2020: Formula Regional European Championship; Italian F4 Championship; F4 Spanish Championship

Nicolás Baptiste Velasco (born 31 October 2005) is a Colombian racing driver who last competed in the 2024 USF Pro 2000 Championship for BN Racing. He previously competed in the 2022 Formula Regional European Championship for FA Racing.

== Career ==
=== Karting ===
Baptiste debuted in karting at the age of nine and started karting competitively two years later in 2016. His highest ranking in a karting competition would be eighth in the Colombia Rotax Max Challenge. He took part in the European Championship in 2020, ending up 60th in the standings.

=== Formula 4 ===
==== 2020 ====
Baptiste made his single-seater debut during the penultimate round of the 2020 F4 Spanish Championship, a week after his fifteenth birthday. He took part in one weekend, the Jarama round, and finished 14th and two twelfth places in the races.

Two weeks later, Baptiste made his debut in the 2020 Italian F4 Championship with Cram Motorsport for the final two rounds. He took a best finish of 15th and finished 27th in the championship.

==== 2021 ====
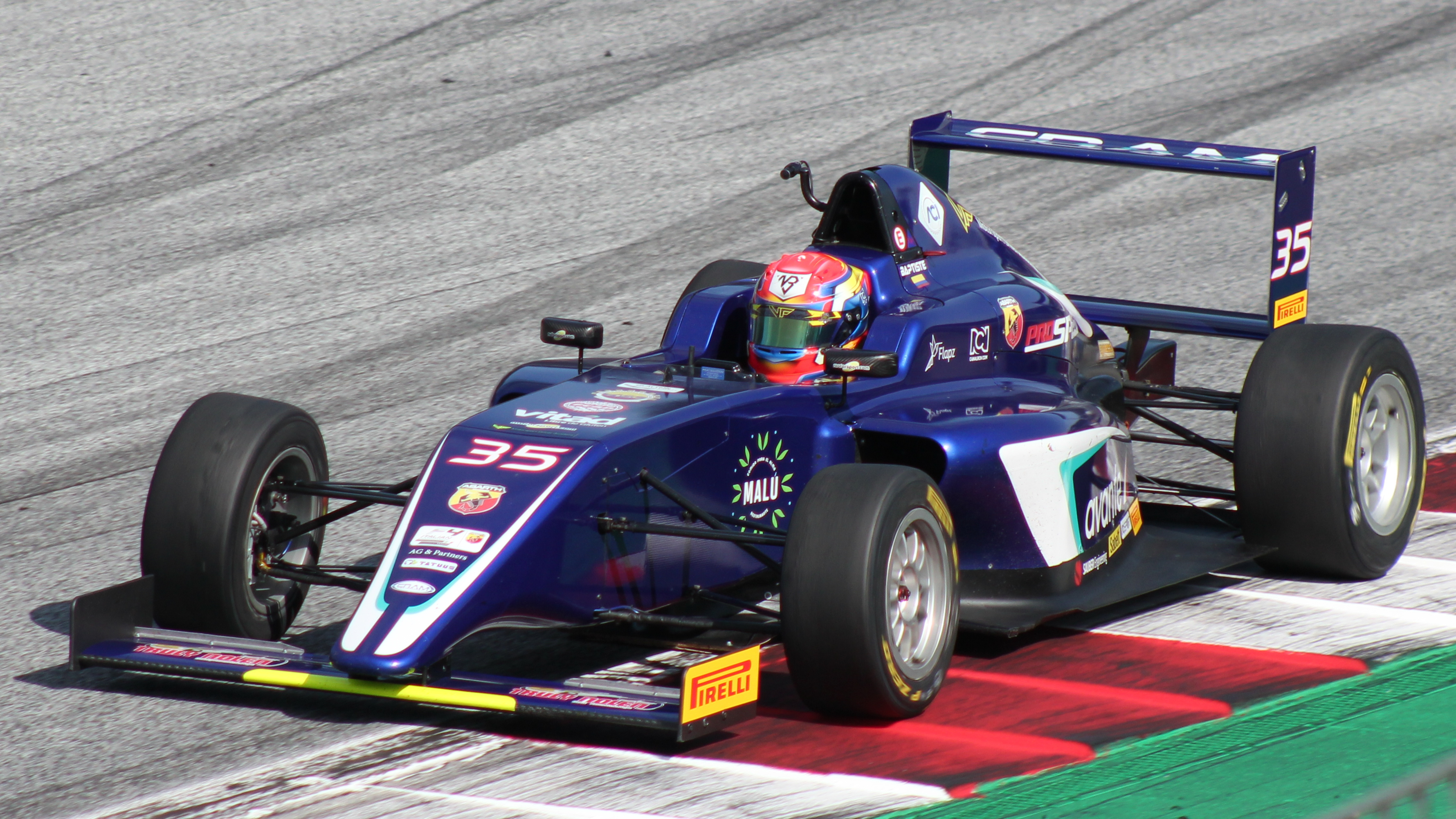
Baptiste racing in the 2021 Italian F4 Championship at the Red Bull Ring.

Baptiste contested the full 2021 Italian F4 Championship as his main campaign, again with Cram Motorsport. He scored his first points in eighth place during the second Misano race, and he was also the second best rookie. His next points finish came at the last race in the Red Bull Ring scoring a fifth place and placing the best of the rookies. Baptiste would not go on to score any more points and he finished 24th in the championship with 14 points, and ninth in the rookies'.

=== Formula Regional European Championship ===
==== 2022 ====
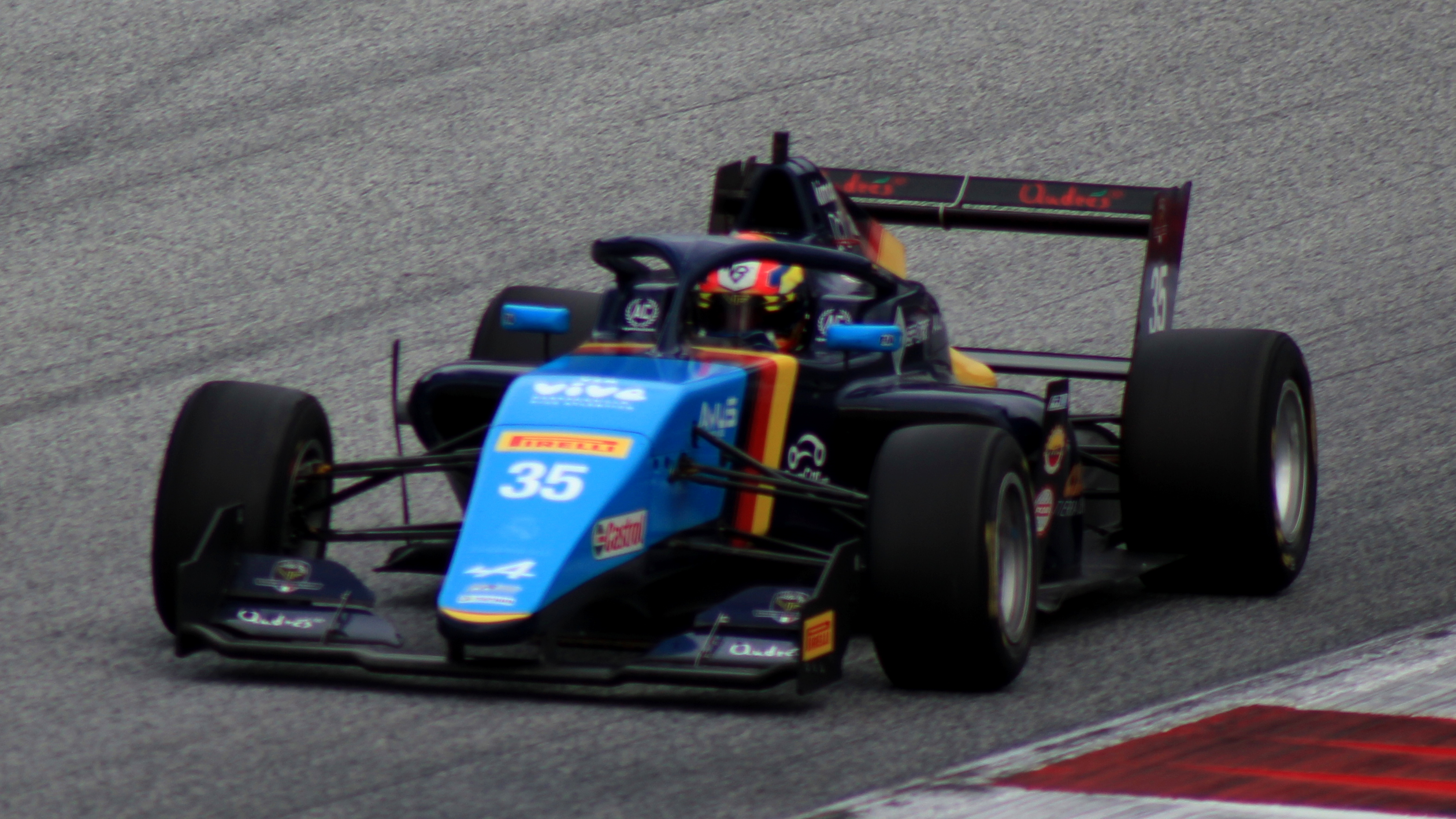
Baptiste racing in the 2022 Formula Regional European Championship at the Red Bull Ring.

Baptiste stepped up to the 2022 Formula Regional European Championship. He joined two-time Formula One World Champion Fernando Alonso's team, FA Racing, alongside Victor Bernier and Esteban Masson. During his debut weekend in Monza, he finished 16th and 29th. Baptiste ended very strongly during the final weekend in Mugello, he qualified a season high of seventh during the first race, although he would drop to 15th which was his season best result. Baptiste would finish 29th in the standings, the only one in his team not to score points during the season.

==== 2023 ====
Baptiste was expected to remain in Formula Regional for 2023, switching over to Saintéloc Racing. However, for unknown reasons, he did not compete in any race.

=== USF Pro 2000 Championship ===
After a year on the sidelines, Baptiste returned to racing in 2024 with a full-time drive in the USF Pro 2000 Championship with BN Racing. He had a highest finish that year of fifth during the second race in NOLA Motorsports Park. He ended his season early with two rounds to go and finished 15th in the championship with 143 points.

== Karting record ==
=== Karting career summary ===
Season	Series	Team	Position
2016	Rotax Max Challenge Colombia — Mini Max		8th
2016	SKUSA SuperNationals — Mini Swift	Team Montoya	65th
2017	SKUSA SuperNationals — Mini Swift	Team Montoya	49th
2018	SKUSA SuperNationals — X30 Junior	Team Montoya	62nd
2019	SKUSA SuperNationals — X30 Junior		—
2019	WSK Open Cup — OKJ	Lennox Racing Team	62nd
2019	CIK-FIA European Championship — OKJ	Lennox Racing Team	—
2019	CIK-FIA World Championship — OKJ	Lennox Racing Team	—
2019	WSK Euro Series — OKJ	Lennox Racing Team	—
2019	WSK Super Master Series — OKJ	Lennox Racing Team	—
2019	CIK-FIA Karting Academy Trophy	Lennox Racing Team	—
2020	SKUSA Winter Series — X30 Senior		—
2020	CIK-FIA European Championship — OK	Ward Racing	60th
2020	WSK Super Master Series — OK	Ward Racing	54th

== Racing record ==
=== Racing career summary ===
Season	Series	Team	Races	Wins	Poles	F/Laps	Podiums	Points	Position
2020	Italian F4 Championship	Cram Motorsport	5	0	0	0	0	0	37th
2020	F4 Spanish Championship	Drivex School	3	0	0	0	0	0	NC†
2021	Italian F4 Championship	Cram Motorsport	21	0	0	0	0	14	24th
2022	Formula Regional European Championship	FA Racing by MP	19	0	0	0	0	0	29th
2024	USF Pro 2000 Championship	BN Racing	14	0	0	0	0	143	15th

^{†} As Baptiste was a guest driver, he was ineligible to score points.
^{*} Season still in progress.

=== Complete Italian F4 Championship results ===
(key) (Races in bold indicate pole position) (Races in italics indicate fastest lap)

Year	Team	1	2	3	4	5	6	7	8	9	10	11	12	13	14	15	16	17	18	19	20	21	Pos	Points
2020	Cram Motorsport	MIS; 1	MIS; 2	MIS; 3	IMO1; 1	IMO1; 2	IMO1; 3	RBR; 1	RBR; 2	RBR; 3	MUG; 1	MUG; 2	MUG; 3	MNZ; 1	MNZ; 2	MNZ; 3	IMO2; 1; 27	IMO2; 2; 15	IMO2; 3; 31	VLL; 1 Ret	VLL; 2 C	VLL; 3; 26	37th	0
2021	Cram Motorsport	LEC; 1; 29	LEC; 2; 18	LEC; 3; 26	MIS; 1; 19	MIS; 2; 8	MIS; 3; 22	VLL; 1; 18	VLL; 2; 15	VLL; 3; 19	IMO; 1; 13	IMO; 2; 24	IMO; 3; 24	RBR; 1 Ret	RBR; 2; 17	RBR; 3; 5	MUG; 1; 24	MUG; 2; 19	MUG; 3; 25	MNZ; 1 Ret	MNZ; 2; 32†	MNZ; 3; 17	24th	14

=== Complete F4 Spanish Championship results ===
(key) (Races in bold indicate pole position) (Races in italics indicate fastest lap)

Year	Team	1	2	3	4	5	6	7	8	9	10	11	12	13	14	15	16	17	18	19	20	21	DC	Points
2020	Drivex School	NAV; 1	NAV; 2	NAV; 3	LEC; 1	LEC; 2	LEC; 3	JER; 1	JER; 2	JER; 3	CRT; 1	CRT; 2	CRT; 3	ARA; 1	ARA; 2	ARA; 3	JAR; 1; 14	JAR; 2; 12	JAR; 3; 12	CAT; 1	CAT; 2	CAT; 3	NC†	0

^{†} As Baptiste was a guest driver, he was ineligible to score points.

=== Complete Formula Regional European Championship results ===
(key) (Races in bold indicate pole position) (Races in italics indicate fastest lap)

Year	Team	1	2	3	4	5	6	7	8	9	10	11	12	13	14	15	16	17	18	19	20	DC	Points
2022	FA Racing by MP	MNZ; 1; 16	MNZ; 2; 29	IMO; 1 Ret	IMO; 2; 26	MCO; 1 DNQ	MCO; 2; 25	LEC; 1; 33	LEC; 2; 28	ZAN; 1; 27	ZAN; 2; 26	HUN; 1; 30	HUN; 2; 28	SPA; 1; 30	SPA; 2; 27	RBR; 1; 25	RBR; 2; 21	CAT; 1; 31	CAT; 2; 22	MUG; 1; 15	MUG; 2; 21	29th	0

=== American open-wheel racing results ===
==== USF Pro 2000 Championship ====
(key) (Races in bold indicate pole position) (Races in italics indicate fastest lap) (Races with * indicate most race laps led)

Year	Team	1	2	3	4	5	6	7	8	9	10	11	12	13	14	15	16	17	18	Rank	Points
2024	BN Racing	STP; 1; 9	STP; 2; 18	LOU; 1; 6	LOU; 2; 5	LOU; 3; 12	IMS; 1; 6	IMS; 2; 6	IMS; 3; 10	IRP; 7	ROA; 1; 18	ROA; 2; 16	ROA; 3; 11	MOH; 1; 19	MOH; 2; 16	TOR; 1	TOR; 2	POR; 1	POR; 2	15th	143
