= Grand Prix of Indianapolis =

IndyCar Series races at the Indianapolis Motor Speedway Road Course

IndyCar Series at the Indianapolis Motor Speedway Road Course

IndyCar Series
- Venue: Indianapolis Motor Speedway
- Location: Speedway, Indiana, U.S.

Events in the NTT IndyCar Series have been held annually at the Indianapolis Motor Speedway Road Course in Speedway, Indiana since 2014. Events are known as the IndyCar Grand Prix and the Grand Prix of Indianapolis.

== History ==
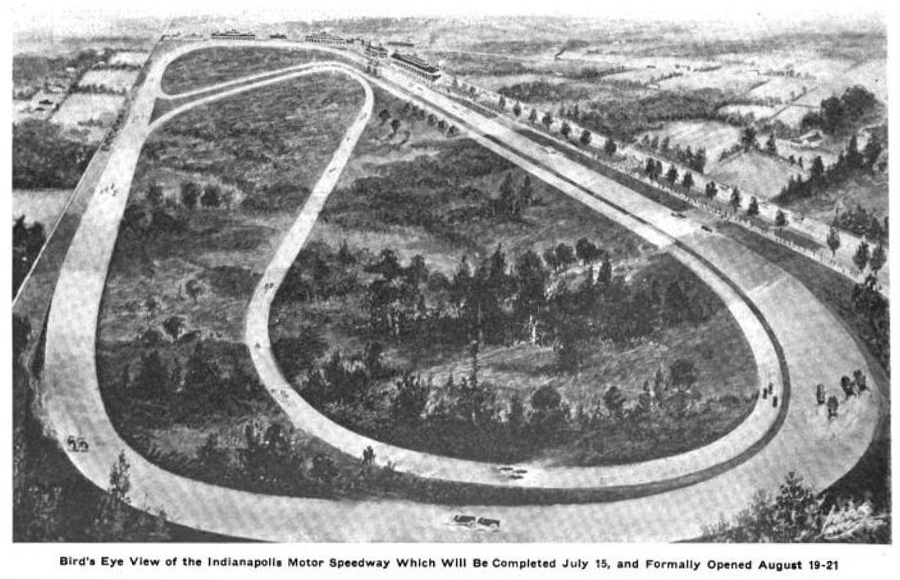
An early rendering of a combined road course layout, ca. 1909.

The addition of the Grand Prix of Indianapolis established two Indy car races in the Indianapolis area. It was the first time since 1970 that multiple Championship/Indy car races are being held in the greater Indianapolis area. Through 1970, the Indy 500 was accompanied by the Hoosier Hundred at the Indiana State Fairgrounds, which at the time was a National Championship event. The Hoosier Grand Prix at Indianapolis Raceway Park was held as a USAC Champ Car race from 1965 to 1970.

When the Indianapolis Motor Speedway was under construction in 1909, the original plans included a combined road course layout. This would have allowed for both oval track and road course events. According to historian Donald Davidson, some initial grading appears to have been completed for what would have been a 5-mile layout, but plans for the road course were scrapped during construction. It was not until 1998 that plans for a road course layout at the facility were revived, when the United States Grand Prix was announced.

In 1990, a street circuit in downtown Indianapolis was proposed, with a goal of attracting a Formula One or CART Indy car race. The layout encompassed roads near the Hoosier Dome and Indianapolis Zoo. The plan never materialized.

In the 2020 season, four races were held in Indianapolis, with the three road course events—one during the NASCAR and two during the Intercontinental GT Challenge meeting—as a result of COVID-19 pandemic-related postponements. For 2021, one road course was held during the month of May and one during the NASCAR weekend.

== Current race ==
Sonsio Grand Prix

IndyCar Series
- Venue: Indianapolis Motor Speedway
- Corporate sponsor: Sonsio Vehicle Protection
- First race: 2014
- Distance: 207.315 miles (333.641 km)
- Laps: 85
- Previous names: Grand Prix of Indianapolis (2014); Angie's List Grand Prix of Indianapolis (2015–2016); INDYCAR Grand Prix (2017–2019); GMR Grand Prix (2020–2023)
- Most wins (driver): Will Power; Simon Pagenaud; Álex Palou (3)
- Most wins (team): Team Penske (5)
- Most wins (manufacturer): Chassis: Dallara (12); Engine: Chevrolet (7)

The Sonsio Grand Prix is an IndyCar Series race held on the combined road course at the Indianapolis Motor Speedway in Speedway, Indiana. The race was first held in 2014 and is typically held on a Saturday in mid-May, two weekends prior to the Indianapolis 500. The race serves as a lead-in to the Indianapolis 500, and includes support races from the Road to Indy, including Indy NXT, USF Pro 2000 Championship and USF2000 Championship.

The race is run on a newer, modified layout of the circuit previously used for the Formula One United States Grand Prix, and later the Moto GP motorcycle event.

=== Background ===
Flyover at the 2016 Grand Prix

In 2012, Hulman & Co., then parent company of the Indianapolis Motor Speedway, hired Boston Consulting Group to evaluate its business operations. In their report, one of their suggestions was to explore the possibility of hosting an IndyCar Series race on the road course at Indy. The modern FIA Grade One infield road course had opened in 2000, and was initially used for the United States Grand Prix from 2000 to 2007. Later, it was used for Moto GP, and Grand Am. The layout for the infield road course was originally designed in 1992 by Kevin Forbes during the reconstruction of the Brickyard Crossing golf course. It had already gone through some various improvements, most notably in 2008 when the "Snake Pit" segment was added in the infield of oval turn one. Indy cars had never raced on the road course layout, sticking only to the oval circuit for the Indianapolis 500, but their support series, the Indy Lights, had raced there four times. Occasionally Indy cars used the Indianapolis road course as a test facility, since many teams are headquartered in the Indianapolis area. Dan Wheldon notably tested the DW12 chassis at the course in September 2011.

In September 2013, an IndyCar feasibility test was conducted on the Indianapolis Motor Speedway road course. The test yielded positive results. Speculation immediately began to grow about a possible race for 2014, either as a May "doubleheader" event with the Indy 500, or a stand-alone race in the fall. The inaugural race was announced on October 1, 2013, and was scheduled for early May. The decision was made to utilize the course in a clockwise layout, and to re-work certain parts of the track.

==== Course changes ====
In October 2013, a construction project began to reconfigure the road course layout in order to the make the circuit more competitive, better for fans, and more suited for Indy cars. The entire road course portion was repaved, while several segments were modified. Corner one of road course was changed to a 90-degree turn with a raised curb on the inside. The road course portion inside oval turn four was revised to bypass two slow turns, and effectively lengthened the Hulman Boulevard backstretch. At the end of the Hulman Blvd. backstretch, a new 90-degree left corner leads to a new series of faster turns behind the Museum. Rather than follow original corner 13 (oval turn 1) like the U.S. Grand Prix did, the IndyCar circuit mimics the motorcycle course, and utilized the "Snake Pit" infield complex. Two of the tighter, sharper, corners (utilized by the motorcycles) were bypassed and replaced with a single 90-degree right turn leading to the pit entry. The new course distance measures 2.439 miles (3.925 km).

==== Schedule ====
From 2014 to 2019, and again since 2021, the IndyCar Grand Prix has been scheduled for the Saturday two weeks before the Indianapolis 500. The race effectively serves as an "opening weekend" for the month of May activities at the Speedway. The race is on the Saturday that was once used for Indy 500 pole day (1952–1997 & 2001–2009), and in other years the opening day of practice (1998–2000 & 2010–2013).

From 2014 to 2016, the race was known as the Grand Prix of Indianapolis, and from 2015 to 2016 it was sponsored by Angie's List. For 2017, the Angie's List title sponsorship was dropped, and the race name was changed to the IndyCar Grand Prix. This was done in order to reduce confusion with the previous Formula One grand prix race that used to be held there, and to emphasize to fans that the race was part of the American-based IndyCar Series.

Saturday was selected for the race due to the fact that the Sunday two weeks before the Indy 500 is usually Mother's Day (a day usually avoided by motorsports). In addition, the track is closed on Sunday to allow crews to convert the track back to the oval layout, and to allow teams to convert their cars from road course to oval configuration. Practice for the Indy 500 on the oval begins the following day on Monday or Tuesday.

For 2021, the GMR Grand Prix moved back to its normal date in early May, with the pandemic-induced meeting held during the NASCAR Verizon 200 weekend continuing. During the NASCAR weekend, the race is an early afternoon Saturday event with the NASCAR Xfinity Shell 150 as the nightcap. Big Machine Spiked Coolers sponsored the first event.

On November 1, 2023, Sonsio Vehicle Protection was named the sponsor of the race.

=== Past winners ===
Season	Date	Driver	Team	Chassis	Engine	Race Distance		Race Time	Average Speed	Report
Season	Date	Driver	Team	Chassis	Engine	Laps	Miles (km)	Race Time	Average Speed	Report
2014	May 10	(France) Simon Pagenaud	Sam Schmidt Motorsports	Dallara (1)	Honda (1)	82	199.998 (321.85)	2:04:24	96.463 mph (155.242 km/h)	Report
2015	May 9	(Australia) Will Power	Team Penske	Dallara (2)	Chevrolet (1)	82	199.998 (321.85)	1:42:42	116.842 mph (188.039 km/h)	Report
2016	May 14	(France) Simon Pagenaud (2)	Team Penske (2)	Dallara (3)	Chevrolet (2)	82	199.998 (321.85)	1:50:19	108.784 mph (175.071 km/h)	Report
2017	May 13	(Australia) Will Power (2)	Team Penske (3)	Dallara (4)	Chevrolet (3)	85	207.315 (333.641)	1:42:58	120.813 mph (194.430 km/h)	Report
2018	May 12	(Australia) Will Power (3)	Team Penske (4)	Dallara (5)	Chevrolet (4)	85	207.315 (333.641)	1:49:46	113.318 mph (182.368 km/h)	Report
2019	May 11	(France) Simon Pagenaud (3)	Team Penske (5)	Dallara (6)	Chevrolet (5)	85	207.315 (333.641)	2:00:28	103.254 mph (166.171 km/h)	Report
2021	May 15	(Netherlands) Rinus VeeKay	Ed Carpenter Racing	Dallara (7)	Chevrolet (6)	85	207.315 (333.641)	1:47:09	116.096 mph (186.838 km/h)	Report
2022	May 14	(United States) Colton Herta	Andretti Autosport with Curb Agajanian	Dallara (8)	Honda (2)	75*	182.925 (294.389)	2:01:56	90.008 mph (144.854 km/h)	Report
2023	May 13	(Spain) Álex Palou	Chip Ganassi Racing	Dallara (9)	Honda (3)	85	207.315 (333.641)	1:47:57	115.234 mph (185.451 km/h)	Report
2024	May 11	(Spain) Álex Palou (2)	Chip Ganassi Racing (2)	Dallara (10)	Honda (4)	85	207.315 (333.641)	1:45:27	117.956 mph (189.832 km/h)	Report
2025	May 10	(Spain) Álex Palou (3)	Chip Ganassi Racing (3)	Dallara (11)	Honda (5)	85	207.315 (333.641)	1:48:00	115.163 mph (185.337 km/h)	Report
2026	May 9	(Denmark) Christian Lundgaard	Arrow McLaren (2)	Dallara (12)	Chevrolet (7)	85	207.315 (333.641)	1:55:40	107.536 mph (173.062 km/h)	Report

Notes

- 2022: Race delayed by approx. 45 minutes due to lightning and shortened due to two-hour time limit.

=== Summaries ===
==== 2014 ====
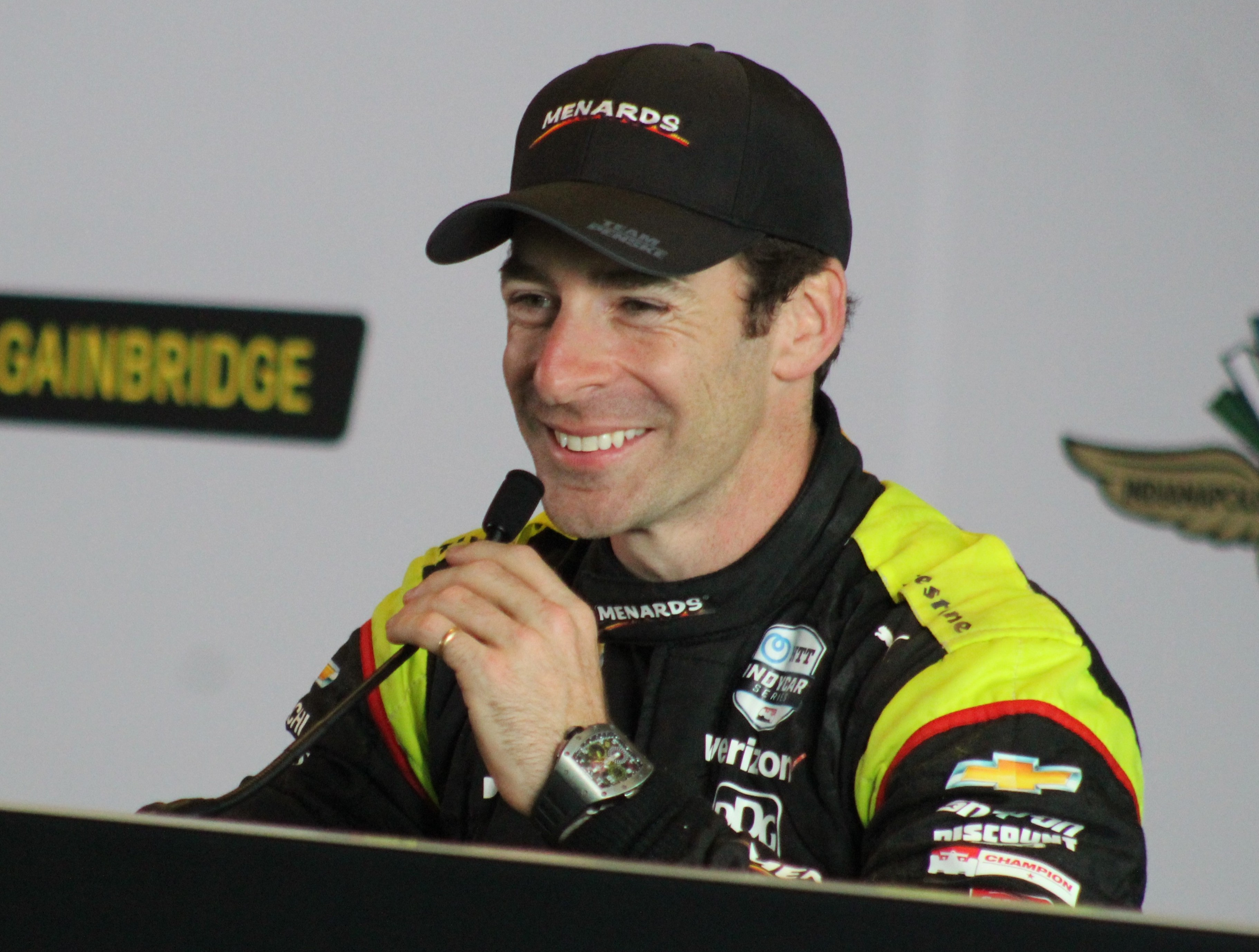
Simon Pagenaud is a three-time winner of the Grand Prix of Indianapolis.

The month of May at Indianapolis opened with the Inaugural Grand Prix of Indianapolis on the Speedway's road course. With the field lined up for a standing start, polesitter Sebastián Saavedra's car stalled. A huge crash resulted, involving Saavedra, Carlos Muñoz, and Mikhail Aleshin, showering debris along the frontstretch and into the pit area.

Late in the race, Simon Pagenaud led Ryan Hunter-Reay. Both drivers were low on fuel, and trying to nurse their cars to the finish. Hélio Castroneves, who had pitted for fuel, was charging through the field, and looking to run down the leaders. Pagenaud held off the challenge, and crossed the finish line just ahead of Hunter-Reay and Castroneves. Pagenaud's car ran out of fuel on the cool down lap. Series rookie Jack Hawksworth, who earned his first front-row start, led a field-high 31 laps and finished seventh.

==== 2015 ====
Will Power won the pole position for the second annual Angie's List Grand Prix of Indianapolis, continuing a dominating trend in 2015 for Penske Racing during qualifying. Penske cars qualified first, third, fourth, and fifth, with Ganassi's Scott Dixon (2nd) situated on the outside of the front row.

At the start, a multi-car tangle in turn one saw Scott Dixon spin out in front of the entire field. Hélio Castroneves (in his milestone 300th Indy car start) was involved in contact, as was Josef Newgarden, and others. Will Power took the lead and dominated the race, leading 65 of 82 laps. Power became the fifth different winner in as many races for 2015.

For the second race in a row, Graham Rahal had a spirited run to finish second. After the final round of pit stops, Rahal was able to close within two seconds of the lead, but was unable to catch Power in the final few laps. The races was slowed for only one yellow to clean up the incident on lap 1.

==== 2016 ====
Simon Pagenaud became the first two-time winner of the Angie's List Grand Prix of Indianapolis. Pagenaud started from the pole position and led 57 of the 82 laps. After a caution came out on lap 38, Conor Daly came to the lead for a total of 14 laps while the field was cycling through different pit stop strategies. On the final series of pit stops, Pagenaud executed a very fast in-lap and out-lap, including a lightning fast 6.7-second pit stop. He emerged as the leader, and led the final 14 laps to victory. Cold temperatures and cloudy, windy conditions made for one of the coldest Indy car races in Speedway history.

It was Team Penske's second consecutive win in the Grand Prix, and 18th overall win at Indy.

==== 2017 ====
Will Power started from the pole position and led 61 of 85 laps en route to victory. The race went the entire distance caution free. Hélio Castroneves led 24 laps, but slipped to fifth at the finish after their tire strategy did not work out favorably. After his final pit stop, Castroneves slipped from second to fifth in the waning laps on the primary black tires, while all the other leaders were on the option red tires.

==== 2018 ====
Will Power won the IndyCar Grand Prix for the second year in a row, and third time overall. Power started on the pole position and led 56 of the 85 laps. Power chased down leader Robert Wickens to take the lead on lap 51 with a daring pass on the outside of turn one. When a full-course caution came out on lap 56 due to a spin by Josef Newgarden, all the leaders headed to the pits for their final pit stops. Power edged Wickens to the blend line by about two feet, to be the lead out of the pits. Powers held off Scott Dixon and Wickens for the victory.

Power's victory was the milestone 200th Indy car victory for Penske Racing, and two weeks later, Power would sweep the month by winning the Indianapolis 500.

==== 2019 ====
In wet and rainy conditions, Simon Pagenaud won the IndyCar Grand Prix for the third time, and matching Will Power's accomplishment from a year earlier, swept the month of May by winning the Indianapolis 500 two weeks later. Pagenaud charged from sixth place to first over the final 18 laps. With two laps to go, race leader Scott Dixon led Pagenaud as they approached the end of the Hulman Boulevard backstretch. Dixon slid a little wide in turn 7, and Pagenaud took the lead in turns 8–9. Pagenaud pulled out to a two-second victory.

== Summer race ==
Gallagher Grand Prix
IndyCar Series
- Venue: Indianapolis Motor Speedway
- Corporate sponsor: Gallagher
- First race: 2020
- Last race: 2023
- Distance: 207.315 miles (333.641 km)
- Laps: 85
- Previous names: IndyCar Grand Prix (2020); Big Machine Spiked Coolers Grand Prix (2021); Gallagher Grand Prix (2022–2023)
- Most wins (driver): Scott Dixon (2)
- Most wins (team): Chip Ganassi Racing (2)
- Most wins (manufacturer): Chassis: Dallara (4); Engine: Honda (3)

The Gallagher Grand Prix was held during the summer as a support race for the NASCAR Cup Series Verizon 200 at the Brickyard. The race was run from 2020 until 2023.

=== History ===
On April 29, 2022, the Arthur J. Gallagher & Co. was named sponsor of the summer race.

=== Past winners ===
Season	Date	Driver	Team	Chassis	Engine	Race Distance		Race Time	Average Speed	Report
Season	Date	Driver	Team	Chassis	Engine	Laps	Miles (km)	Race Time	Average Speed	Report
2020	July 4*	(New Zealand) Scott Dixon	Chip Ganassi Racing	Dallara (1)	Honda (1)	80	195.12 (314.02)	1:41:59	114.789 mph (184.735 km/h)	Report
2021	August 14	(Australia) Will Power	Team Penske	Dallara (2)	Chevrolet (1)	85	207.315 (333.641)	1:49:38	113.458 mph (182.593 km/h)	Report
2022	July 30	(United States) Alexander Rossi	Andretti Autosport	Dallara (3)	Honda (2)	85	207.315 (333.641)	1:48:39	114.483 mph (184.243 km/h)	Report
2023	August 12	(New Zealand) Scott Dixon	Chip Ganassi Racing	Dallara (4)	Honda (3)	85	207.315 (333.641)	1:51:24	111.647 mph (179.678 km/h)	Report

=== Summaries ===
==== 2020 ====
Due to the COVID-19 pandemic, the GMR Grand Prix was moved from its traditional May date to July 4 weekend. It became part of the NASCAR Big Machine Hand Sanitizer 400 weekend, and was part of a doubleheader on Saturday with the Pennzoil 150 of the Xfinity Series. Scott Dixon dominated the race, running away from the field after a full-course caution shuffled the standings on lap 36. Dixon had made his second pit stop under green on lap 33, but three laps later Oliver Askew crashed hard in turn 14. The leaders subsequently pitted under the caution, allowing Dixon to cycle up to the front of the pack. After the green came back out, Dixon chased down leader Graham Rahal and took the lead on lap 48. Despite Rahal only making two pit stops - compared to three by Dixon - Dixon was able to cruise over the final twenty laps, and he won by 19.9469 seconds. It was Dixon's first victory (after three second places) in the GMR Grand Prix, and Dixon's first victory at the Indianapolis Motor Speedway since winning the 2008 Indianapolis 500.

== Fall race ==
Harvest Grand Prix
IndyCar Series
- Venue: Indianapolis Motor Speedway
- Corporate sponsor: Harvest Auto Racing Classic
- First race: 2020
- Last race: 2020
- Distance: 207.315 miles (333.641 km)
- Laps: 85
- Previous names: Harvest Grand Prix (2020)
- Most wins (team): Team Penske (2)
- Most wins (manufacturer): Chassis: Dallara (2); Engine: Chevrolet (2)

The Harvest Grand Prix was a two-race doubleheader, held on the weekend of the Intercontinental GT Challenge.

=== History ===
On April 6, 2020, the IndyCar Series announced that as part of revisions to the 2020 season due to the COVID-19 pandemic, it would add a third event at the Indianapolis Motor Speedway to the schedule known as the IndyCar Harvest GP on the road course. Later, it was expanded to become a doubleheader on October 2–3. Its naming pays tribute to the Harvest Auto Racing Classic, and served as a support event accompanying the inaugural Indianapolis 8 Hour of the Intercontinental GT Challenge circuit. It was the second road course race at IMS for the 2020 season, alongside the GMR Grand Prix (which was moved to July 4 as part of NASCAR's Brickyard 400 weekend).

=== Past winners ===
Season	Date	Driver	Team	Chassis	Engine	Race Distance		Race Time	Average Speed	Report
Season	Date	Driver	Team	Chassis	Engine	Laps	Miles (km)	Race Time	Average Speed	Report
2020	October 2	(United States) Josef Newgarden	Team Penske	Dallara	Chevrolet	85	207.315 (333.641)	01:44:28	119.060	Report
2020	October 3	(Australia) Will Power	Team Penske	Dallara	Chevrolet	75	182.925 (294.389)	01:32:08	119.115	Report

=== Summaries ===
==== 2020 ====
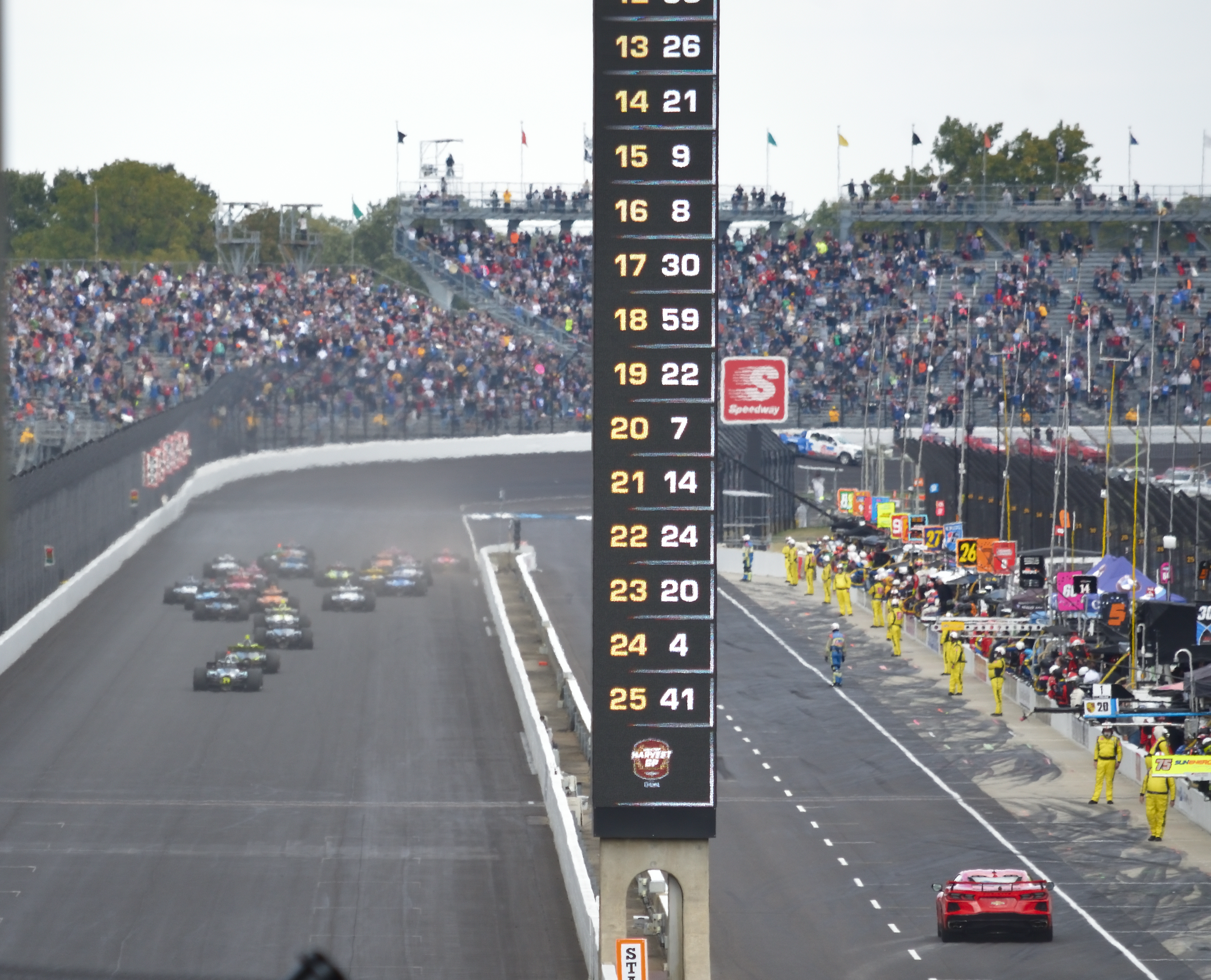
The field races into turn 1 at the start of Race 2 of the 2020 Harvest GP. Spectators were allowed for the final two major race meetings of 2020 at the Speedway (Intercontinental GT Challenge and MotoAmerica in October) after being prohibited for the Big Machine 400, Indianapolis 500, and Road to Indy meetings.

Also because of the pandemic, and race cancellations, two races were added as part of the Intercontinental GT Challenge weekend 8 Hours of Indianapolis in October, and the first race meeting of the season open to spectators. The first race of the Harvest GP doubleheader was held on Friday October 2. The race was scheduled for 85 laps, and rookie Rinus VeeKay won the pole position. Colton Herta grabbed the lead on the first lap from the third starting position. VeeKay was able to take the lead on lap 7, then led the next 15 laps. Later in the race, Herta was back in the lead with Josef Newgarden chasing him down. Going into turn one on lap 60, Newgarden made a decisive pass, and Herta locked up the tires and overshot the turn. The leaders then made their final pits stops, with Newgarden coming back out as the leader. Newgarden led the final 25 laps to victory, and was able to close the gap in the championship hunt as points leader Scott Dixon managed only a ninth-place result.

The second race of the Harvest GP doubleheader was held on Saturday October 3. The race was scheduled for 75 laps (down from 85 laps on Friday). Will Power started from the pole position and led all 75 laps, scoring his fourth win on the Indianapolis Motor Speedway road course. Power took the lead as the start, and pulled out to comfortable lead. After the final round of pit stops, Alexander Rossi and Colton Herta were battling for second place. Herta passed Rossi, then set his sights on power. With Power's tires starting to go away, Herta closed the gap to less than half a second. Power held on to win by only 0.8932 seconds in the caution-free event.

== Support races ==
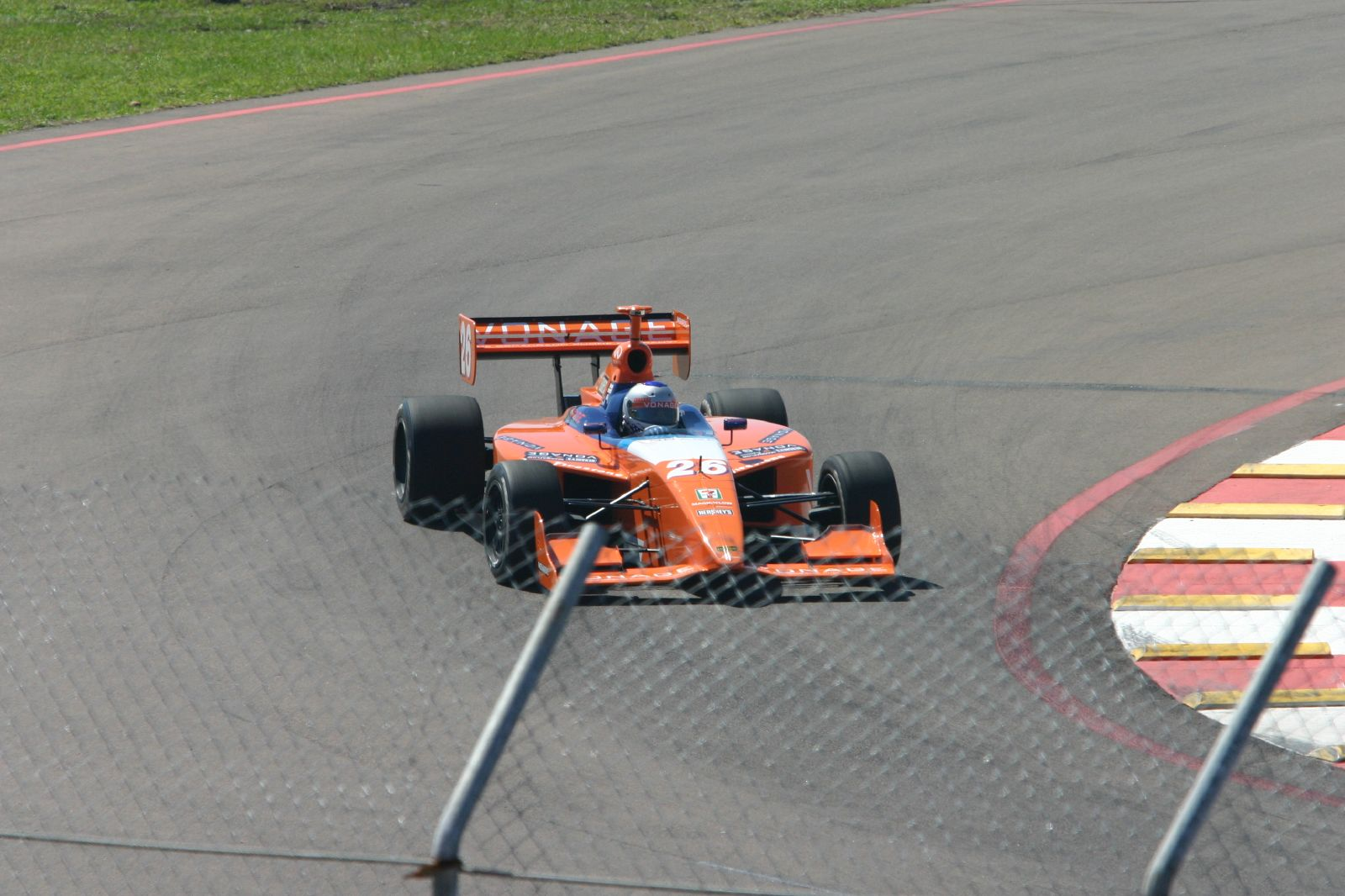
In 2005 Marco Andretti won the first Indy Lights race on the Indianapolis road course (then known as the Liberty Challenge)

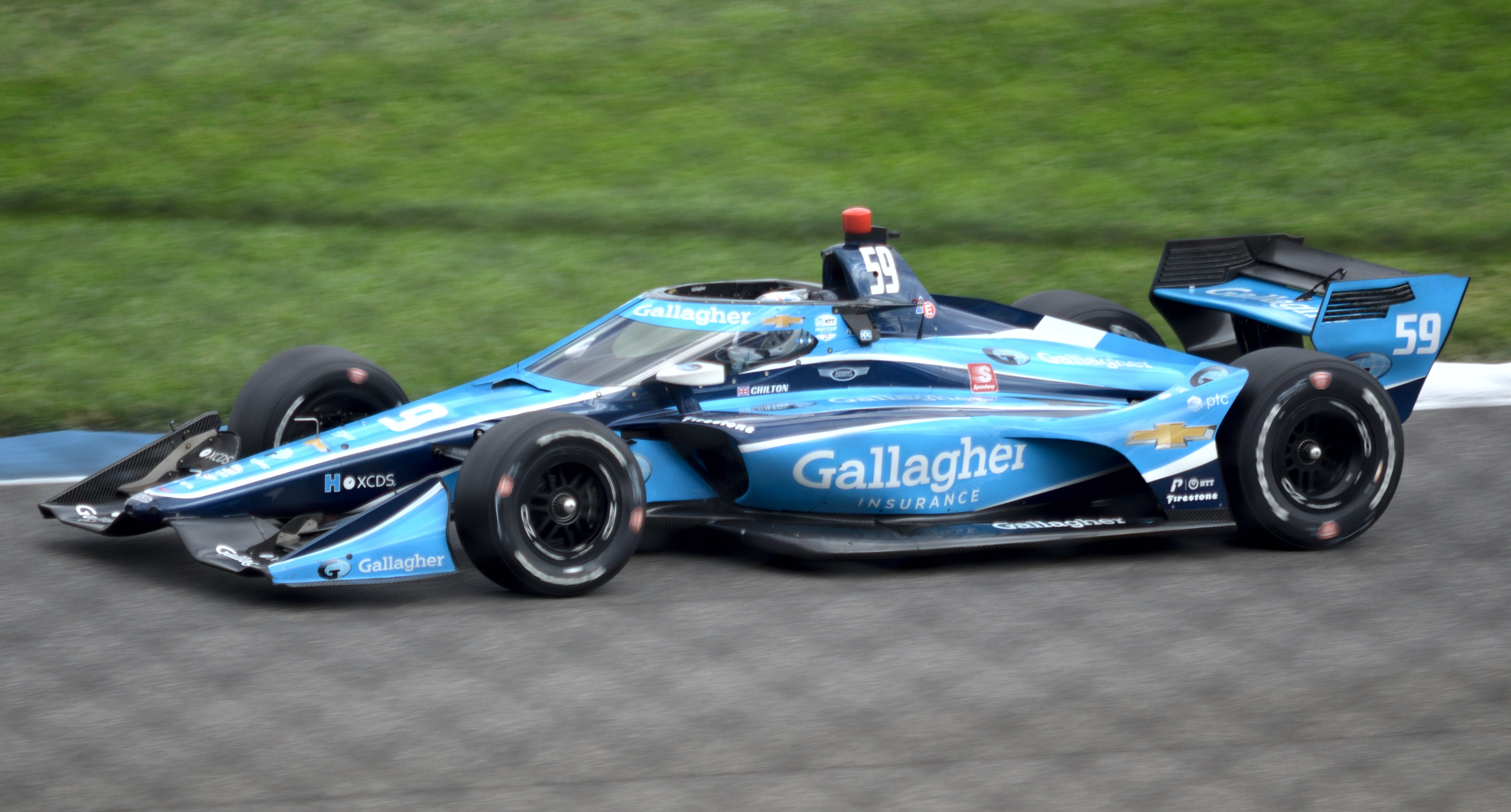
Max Chilton races through turn 14 during the 2020 IndyCar Harvest GP.

=== Indy NXT / Indy Lights ===
The Indy NXT Indianapolis Grand Prix is a pair of twin races in the Indy NXT series, held on the combined road course at the Indianapolis Motor Speedway. For the first three years of its existence, the Indy Pro Series was contested on oval tracks only. All Indy Pro Series races were run as support to IRL/IndyCar Series events. Road course and street course events were added to both series in 2005, and the series was renamed to Indy Lights beginning in 2008.

The race was first introduced as the Liberty Challenge (2005–2007) and was held as a support race to the Formula One United States Grand Prix at Indianapolis. The Liberty Challenge was the first Indy Pro Series race which was not run as support to an IndyCar Series weekend. This move allowed the Indy Pro Series drivers valuable exposure in front of the Formula One teams and fans. Some drivers, such as Graham Rahal, ran this race as a one-off, while running full-time in other series (such as the Atlantics). The U.S. Grand Prix at Indianapolis ended after 2007, and the Liberty Challenge event was put on hiatus.

An Indy Lights (now Indy NXT) race on the Indianapolis road course was revived in 2014 as part of the new IndyCar Grand Prix weekend. However, the original Liberty Challenge name was dropped. In addition, the race was now being contested on the newer 2.439-mile road course layout used by the IndyCar Series.

Season	Date	Winning driver	Winning team
Indy Pro Series
2005	June 18	(United States) Marco Andretti	Andretti Green Racing
2006	July 1	(United Kingdom) Alex Lloyd	Gary Peterson
2007	June 16	(Japan) Hideki Mutoh	Super Aguri Panther Racing
2007	June 17	(United States) Bobby Wilson	Brian Stewart Racing
Indy Lights
2014	May 9	(Australia) Matthew Brabham	Andretti Autosport
2014	May 10	(Brazil) Luiz Razia	Schmidt Peterson Motorsports
2015	May 8	(United Kingdom) Jack Harvey	Schmidt Peterson Motorsports
2015	May 9	(United States) Sean Rayhall	8 Star Motorsports
2016	May 13	(United Arab Emirates) Ed Jones	Carlin
2016	May 14	(United Kingdom) Dean Stoneman	Andretti Autosport
2017	May 12	(France) Nico Jamin	Andretti Autosport
2017	May 13	(United States) Kyle Kaiser	Juncos Racing
2018	May 11	(United States) Colton Herta	Andretti Steinbrenner Racing
2018	May 12	(United States) Colton Herta	Andretti Steinbrenner Racing
2019	May 10	(United States) Robert Megennis	Andretti Autosport
2019	May 11	(Netherlands) Rinus VeeKay	Juncos Racing
2020	Canceled due to the COVID-19 pandemic		
2021	May 14	(Sweden) Linus Lundqvist	HMD Motorsports
2021	May 15	(United States) David Malukas	HMD Motorsports
2022	May 13	(Singapore) Danial Frost	HMD Motorsports w/ Dale Coyne Racing
2022	May 14	(Sweden) Linus Lundqvist	HMD Motorsports w/ Dale Coyne Racing
Indy NXT
2023	May 13	(Italy) Matteo Nannini	Juncos Hollinger Racing
2024	May 10	(United States) Jacob Abel	Abel Motorsports
2024	May 11	(United Kingdom) Louis Foster	Andretti Global
2025	May 9	(Australia) Lochie Hughes	Andretti Global
2025	May 10	(Norway) Dennis Hauger	Andretti Global
2026	May 8	(Brazil) Enzo Fittipaldi	HMD Motorsports
2026	May 9	(Poland) Tymek Kucharczyk	HMD Motorsports

=== USF Pro 2000 Championship ===
Pro Mazda Championship
Season	Date	Winning driver	Winning team
2014	May 9	(Canada) Scott Hargrove	Cape Motorsports
2014	May 10	(Canada) Scott Hargrove	Cape Motorsports
2015*	May 7	(Malaysia) Weiron Tan	Andretti Autosport
2015*	May 8	(France) Timothé Buret	Juncos Racing
2015*	May 9	(Uruguay) Santiago Urrutia	Team Pelfrey
2016	May 13	(Mexico) Patricio O'Ward	Team Pelfrey
2016	May 14	(Mexico) Patricio O'Ward	Team Pelfrey
2017	May 12	(Brazil) Victor Franzoni	Juncos Racing
2017	May 13	(Brazil) Victor Franzoni	Juncos Racing
2018	May 11	(United Kingdom) Harrison Scott	RP Motorsport
2018	May 12	(Canada) Parker Thompson	Exclusive Autosport
Indy Pro 2000 Championship
2019	May 10	(Sweden) Rasmus Lindh	Juncos Racing
2019	May 11	(Sweden) Rasmus Lindh	Juncos Racing
2020*	September 3	(United States) Sting Ray Robb	Juncos Racing
2020*	September 4	(United States) Sting Ray Robb	Juncos Racing
2020*	September 4	(United States) Sting Ray Robb	Juncos Racing
2021	May 14	(Denmark) Christian Rasmussen	Jay Howard Driver Development
2021	May 15	(Russia) Artem Petrov	Exclusive Autosport
2021	May 15	(Denmark) Christian Rasmussen	Jay Howard Driver Development
2022	May 13	(Mexico) Salvador de Alba	Jay Howard Driver Development
2022	May 14	(United States) Reece Gold	Juncos Hollinger Racing
2022	May 14	(United Kingdom) Louis Foster	Exclusive Autosport
USF Pro 2000 Championship
2023	May 12	(Mexico) Ricardo Escotto	Jay Howard Driver Development
2023	May 13	(Sweden) Joel Granfors	Exclusive Autosport
2024	May 10	(United States) Nikita Johnson	Velocity Racing Development
2024	May 11	(New Zealand) Liam Sceats	TJ Speed Motorsports
2024	May 11	(United States) Simon Sikes	Pabst Racing
2025	May 9	(Israel) Ariel Elkin	TJ Speed Motorsports
2025	May 10	(New Zealand) Jacob Douglas	Pabst Racing
2025	May 10	(Israel) Ariel Elkin	TJ Speed Motorsports
2026	May 9	(New Zealand) Jacob Douglas	Pabst Racing
2026	May 9	(United States) Jack Jeffers	Exclusive Autosport

=== U.S. F2000 National Championship ===
Season	Date	Winning driver	Winning team
2014	May 9	(United States) Will Owen	Pabst Racing Services
2014	May 10	(United States) Adrian Starrantino	JAY Motorsports
2015	May 8	(France) Nico Jamin	Cape Motorsports with Wayne Taylor Racing
2015	May 9	(France) Nico Jamin	Cape Motorsports with Wayne Taylor Racing
2016	May 13	(Australia) Anthony Martin	Cape Motorsports with Wayne Taylor Racing
2016	May 14	(Canada) Parker Thompson	Cape Motorsports with Wayne Taylor Racing
2017	May 12	(United States) Oliver Askew	Cape Motorsports
2017	May 13	(United States) Oliver Askew	Cape Motorsports
2018	May 11	(France) Alexandre Baron	Swan-RJB Motorsports
2018	May 12	(United States) Kyle Kirkwood	Cape Motorsports
2019	May 10	(United States) Braden Eves	Cape Motorsports
2019	May 11	(United States) Braden Eves	Cape Motorsports
2020*	September 3	(Brazil) Eduardo Barrichello	Pabst Racing
2020*	September 4	(Brazil) Eduardo Barrichello	Pabst Racing
2020*	September 4	(United States) Reece Gold	Cape Motorsports
2021	May 14	(United States) Yuven Sundaramoorthy	Pabst Racing
2021	May 14	(United States) Yuven Sundaramoorthy	Pabst Racing
2021	May 15	(Brazil) Kiko Porto	DEForce Racing
2022	May 13	(United Kingdom) Alex Quinn	Velocity Racing Development
2022	May 14	(United Kingdom) Alex Quinn	Velocity Racing Development
2022	May 14	(United Kingdom) Alex Quinn	Velocity Racing Development
2023	May 12	(United States) Sam Corry	Velocity Racing Development
2023	May 13	(United States) Simon Sikes	Pabst Racing
2023	May 13	(Australia) Lochie Hughes	Jay Howard Driver Development
2024	May 10	(United States) Max Taylor	Velocity Racing Development
2024	May 11	(United States) Max Garcia	Pabst Racing
2025	May 9	(United States) Jack Jeffers	Exclusive Autosport
2025	May 10	(United States) Thomas Schrage	Velocity Racing Development
2026	May 8	(Canada) Anthony Martella	Exclusive Autosport
2026	May 9	(Colombia) Sebastián Garzón	DEForce Racing
2026	May 9	(Australia) Brad Majman	Pabst Racing

- 2015: Three races were held in 2015. Due to severe weather at the NOLA race, that event was cancelled. The race was made up and moved to Indianapolis, utilizing the same grid.
- 2020: Due to the logistics of attempting to hold the Road to Indy (USF2000 and Pro 2000) events on the NASCAR Brickyard weekend, following the cancellation of the traditional May meeting caused by the COVID-19 pandemic, the event was moved to a stand-alone date in September. Indy Lights was not held as the series did not compete in 2020.

Preceded by Grand Prix of Long Beach	IndyCar Series; Sonsio Grand Prix	Succeeded by Indianapolis 500
