= Amanda Cartier =

American Female Formula 4 Race Car Driver

- Nationality: (United States) American
- Born: 14 November 1977 (age 48) Houston, Texas, U.S.

2019 Formula 4 United States Championship career
- Debut season: 2019 Formula Pro USA Western Championships
- Current team: World Speed Motorsports
- Car number: 32
- Starts: 6
- Wins: 3
- Best finish: 6th in 2019

Previous series
- 2019: Formula Pro USA Western Championships

Championship titles
- 2019: F4 Masters Vice-Champion

Amanda Cartier (born November 14, 1977, in Houston, Texas) is an American female race car driver with residence in San Francisco, California, United States. She currently competes in both the Formula Pro USA Western Championships. and Formula 4 United States Championship series.

== Racing career ==
Cartier began her racing career in 2014 by spending two years racing Rotax 125 TAG karts in the Simraceway Arrive and Drive Series with second overall place in the championship in 2015. She then furthered her training by completing the Simraceway Formula 3 School of Racing program located at Sonoma Raceway.

Cartier's F4 racing career started in 2019 when she made her professional racing debut running a half-season in the SCCA Pro Racing sanctioned Formula Pro USA Western Championships with the World Speed Motorsports team. She would go on to win two F4 Masters Class trophies at Sonoma Raceway, ending the season as F4 Masters Vice-Champion and an overall sixth place in the season points championship.

Currently, Cartier had joined in the F4 U.S. Championship support race during the 2019 Formula 1 US Grand Prix at the Circuit of the Americas with two other women. She has announced to continue with Formula Pro USA Championships in 2020.

== Racing record ==
=== Career summary ===
Season	Series	Team	Races	Wins	Poles	F/Laps	Podiums	Points	Position
2019	Formula 4 United States Championship	WorldSpeed Motorsports	2	0	0	0	0	0	45th
2019	Formula Pro USA Championship - FPUSA-4	WorldSpeed Motorsports	6	0	0	0	0	62	6th

=== FPUSA F4 Series Results ===
(key) (Races in bold indicate class win) (Races in italics indicate pole position)

Year	1	2	3	4	5	6	7	8	9	10	11	12	DC	Points
2019	SONOMA	SONOMA	AUTO	AUTO	PORTLAND	PORTLAND	**SONOMA**; **10**	**SONOMA**; **8**	LAGUNA; 10	LAGUNA; 12	LAGUNA; 10	**LAGUNA**; **12**	6th	62

=== USF4 Series Results ===
(key) (Races in bold indicate class win) (Races in italics indicate pole position)

Year	1	2	3	4	5	6	7	8	9	10	11	12	13	14	15	16	17	DC	Points
2019	ATL	ATL	ATL	PIT	PIT	PIT	VIR	VIR	VIR	MDO	MDO	MDO	SEB	SEB	SEB	COTA; 27	COTA; 30	27	0
