= William Lambros =

American racing driver

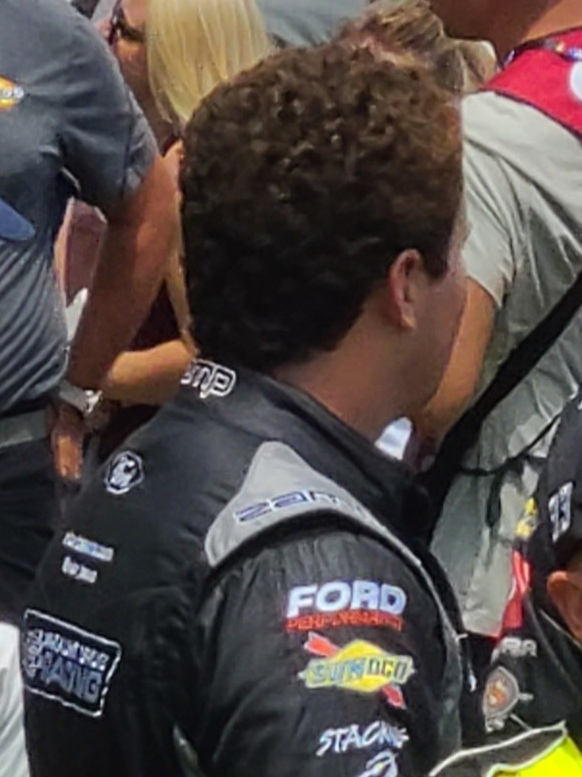
- Lambros at Lime Rock Park in 2025
- Born: William J. Lambros; May 6, 2003 (age 23); Montauk, New York, U.S.

NASCAR FedEx Freight Truck Series career
- 2 races run over 1 year
- 2025 position: 64th
- Best finish: 64th (2025)
- First race: 2025 LiUNA! 150 (Lime Rock)
- Last race: 2025 Mission 176 at The Glen (Watkins Glen)
Wins	Top tens	Poles
0	0	0
- Statistics up to date as of November 1, 2025.

William J. Lambros (born May 6, 2003) is an American professional stock car racing driver. He last competed part-time in the NASCAR Craftsman Truck Series, driving the No. 2 Ford F-150 for Reaume Brothers Racing.

== Racing career ==
Lambros has previously competed in series such as the SMART Modified Tour, the Monaco Modified Tri-Track Series, the Formula 4 United States Championship, the TC America Series, and the Michelin Pilot Challenge.

Lambros first raced at the age of five, competing in go-karts. He then won his first karting championship at the age of thirteen before earning his racing license after completing the Skip Barber 3-Day Racing School and 2-Day Advanced Racing School. He then joined the Skip Barber Driver Development program in 2018.

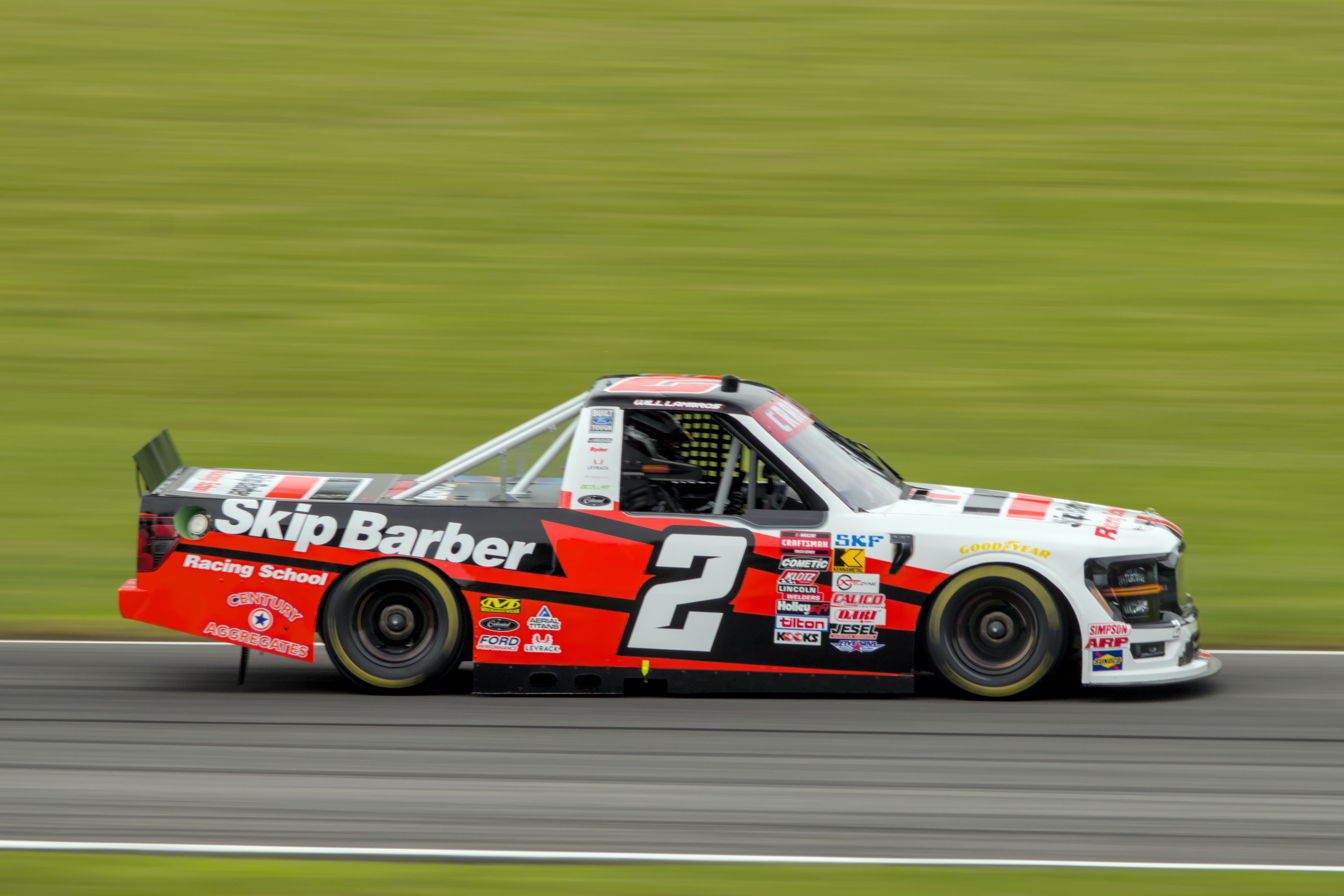
Lambros' No. 2 truck at Lime Rock Park in 2025

In 2025, it was revealed that Lambros would make his debut in the NASCAR Craftsman Truck Series at Lime Rock Park, driving the No. 2 Ford for Reaume Brothers Racing. He made his second Truck Series start in the same truck later in the summer at Watkins Glen International.

== Personal life ==
Lambros is the older brother of fellow racing driver Dean Lambros.

== Motorsports career results ==
=== Single seater career summary ===
Season	Series	Team	Races	Wins	Poles	F/Laps	Podiums	Points	Position
2018	Formula 4 United States Championship	Momentum Motorsports w/ Skip Barber Momentum F4	3	0	0	0	0	0	42nd

=== Stock car career summary ===
Season	Series	Team	Races	Wins	Top 5	Top 10	Points	Position
2024	SMART Modified Tour	Georde Lambros	4	0	0	2	121	24th
2025	SMART Modified Tour	Georde Lambros	2	0	1	2	74	29th
2025	NASCAR Craftsman Truck Series	Reaume Brothers Racing	2	0	0	0	12	64th
2026	SMART Modified Tour	Georde Lambros	13	0	1	3	352	10th

=== Complete Formula 4 United States Championship results ===
(key) (Races in bold indicate pole position) (Races in italics indicate fastest lap)

Year	Entrant	1	2	3	4	5	6	7	8	9	10	11	12	13	14	15	16	17	DC	Points
2018	Momentum Motorsports w/ Skip Barber Momentum F4	VIR; 1	VIR; 2	VIR; 3	ROA; 1	ROA; 2	ROA; 3	MOH; 1	MOH; 2	MOH; 3	PIT; 1	PIT; 2	PIT; 3	NJMP; 1; 22	NJMP; 2; 17	NJMP; 3; 18	COTA; 1	COTA; 2	42nd	0

=== NASCAR ===
(key) (Bold – Pole position awarded by qualifying time. Italics – Pole position earned by points standings or practice time. * – Most laps led.)

==== Craftsman Truck Series ====
NASCAR Craftsman Truck Series results
Year	Team	No.	Make	1	2	3	4	5	6	7	8	9	10	11	12	13	14	15	16	17	18	19	20	21	22	23	24	25	NCTC	Pts	Ref
2025	Reaume Brothers Racing	2	Ford	DAY	ATL	LVS	HOM	MAR	BRI	CAR	TEX	KAN	NWS	CLT	NSH	MCH	POC	LRP; 27	IRP	GLN; 35	RCH	DAR	BRI	NHA	ROV	TAL	MAR	PHO	64th	12	

^{*} Season still in progress
^{1} Ineligible for series points

=== SMART Modified Tour ===
SMART Modified Tour results
Year	Car owner	No.	Make	1	2	3	4	5	6	7	8	9	10	11	12	13	14	SMTC	Pts	Ref
2024	Georde Lambros	77L	N/A	FLO; 8														24th	121	
2024	Georde Lambros	77R	N/A		CRW; 11													24th	121	
2024	Georde Lambros	77	N/A			SBO; 17	TRI; 8	ROU	HCY	FCS	CRW	JAC	CAR	CRW	DOM	SBO	NWS	24th	121	
2025	Georde Lambros	77NY	N/A	FLO	AND	SBO	ROU	HCY	FCS	CRW	CPS	CAR	CRW	DOM	FCS	TRI; 7	NWS; 5	29th	74	
2026	Georde Lambros	77NY	N/A	FLO; 14	AND; 12	SBO; 6	DOM; 5	HCY; 14	WKS; 11	FCR; 13	CRW; 10	PUL; 15	CAR; 18	ROU; 15	TRI; 17	NWS; 31		10th	352	
