= Christian Bogle =

American racing driver (born 2001)

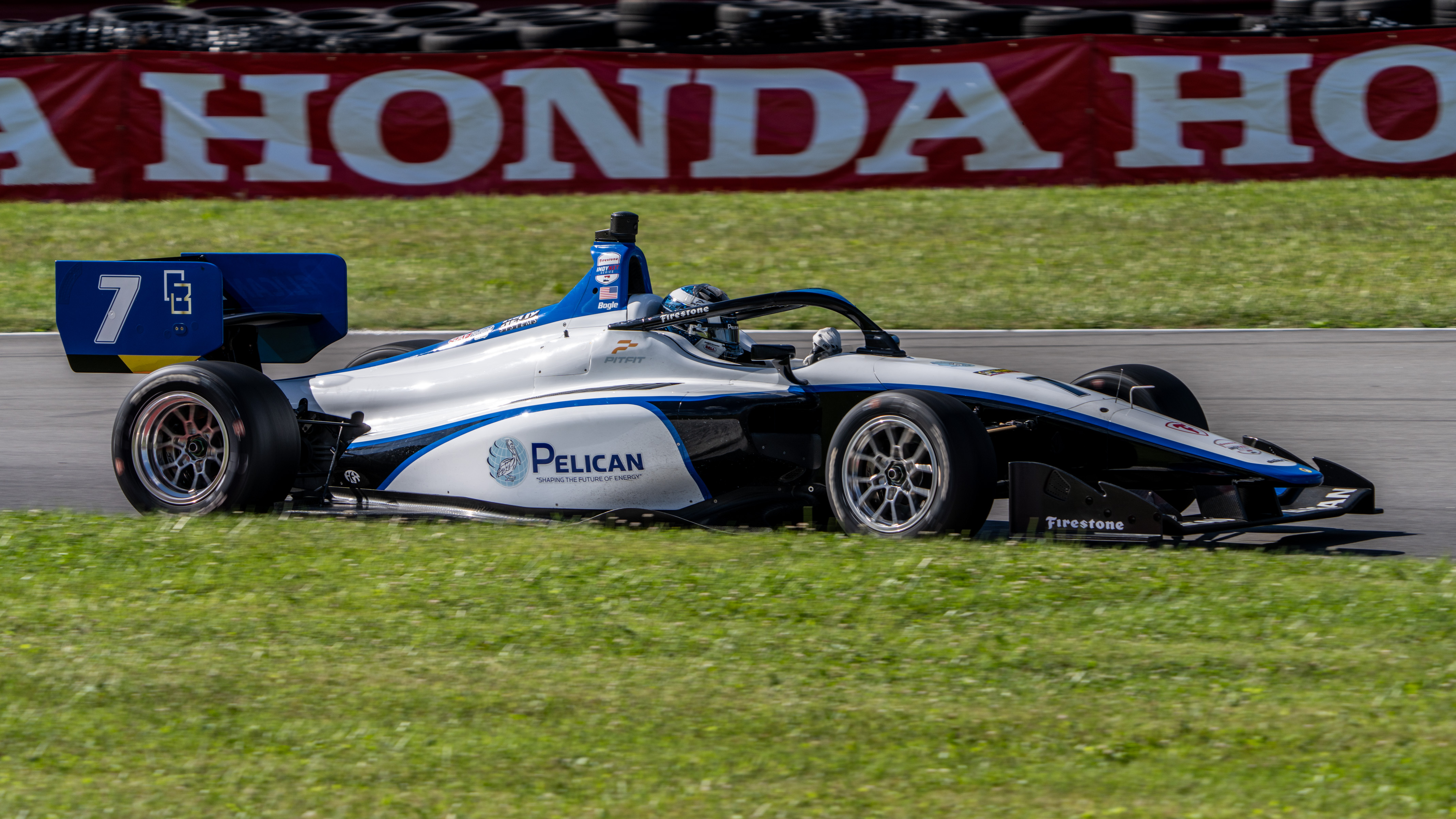
- Nationality: (United States) American
- Born: March 6, 2001 (age 25) Covington, Louisiana, U.S.

GT World Challenge Europe career
- Debut season: 2025
- Current team: Barwell Motorsport
- Categorisation: FIA Silver
- Car number: 76
- Starts: 1 (1 entries)
- Wins: 0
- Podiums: 0
- Poles: 0
- Fastest laps: 0

Previous series
- 2021–24 2023, 2023–24 2022 2021 2019–20 2018–20 2018 2018: Indy NXT; Asian Le Mans Series Le Mans Cup; FR Americas Championship; USF2000 Championship; F4 United States Championship; Atlantic Championship; F2000 Championship Series

Christian Bogle (born March 6, 2001) is an American race car driver from Covington, Louisiana. He last competed in the 2025 GT World Challenge Europe for Barwell Motorsport. Bogle previously competed in Indy NXT from 2021 to 2024.

== Early career ==
=== Lower formulae ===
Having foregone a career in karting, Bogle made his racing debut in 2018, competing in the F4 United States Championship for Jay Howard's team in the latter half of the campaign. He failed to score any points, taking a best finish of 17th place in New Jersey.

For the 2019 season, Bogle would perform double duties with the Jay Howard Driver Development outfit, racing in both the F4 US and U.S. F2000 National championships. The latter would see no meaningful results, with a sole top-ten finish in Toronto helping Bogle to seventeenth in the standings, although in the former a pair of wins at the Circuit of the Americas, the first of his single-seater career, put Bogle tenth in the overall table.

Remaining with JHDD, Bogle would embark on another season of U.S. F2000 in 2020. The start to the season yielded a pair of top-ten results, before Bogle was forced to wait until the penultimate round for his next finish inside the top-ten. He ended his season fifteenth in the drivers' standings.

=== Indy Lights ===
Bogle progressed to the Indy Lights series for 2021, teaming up with Carlin to partner Alex Peroni. Whilst his teammate took a podium in Indianapolis, Bogle remained in the lower half of the top-ten for the majority of the season, getting a highest placing of seventh at Detroit, which placed him eleventh overall at the conclusion of the campaign.

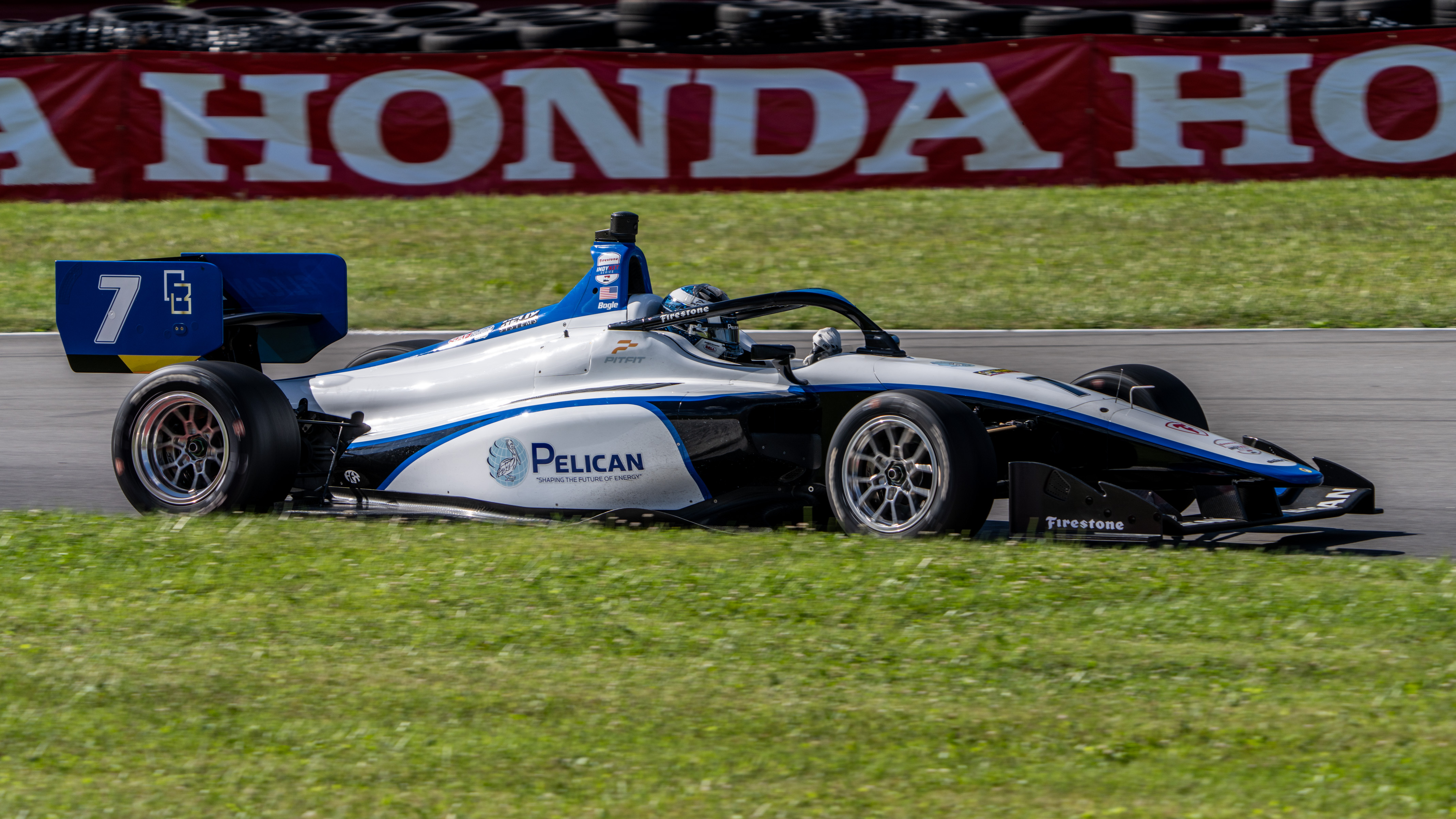
Bogle's 2024 Indy NXT car

HMD Motorsports with Dale Coyne Racing was Bogle's destination for the 2022 Indy Lights season, where he would be joined by Linus Lundqvist and Danial Frost throughout the entirety of the year. Even though Bogle improved his best result compared to the previous year, scoring a fourth place in Detroit, he would remain eleventh in the championship, a mere 277 points behind Lundqvist, who won the title.

For 2023, Bogle stayed on with HMD for a season in the newly rebranded Indy NXT series.

== Sportscar career ==
2022 saw Bogle taking his first step into sportscar racing, as he joined Team Virage for the final two rounds of the Le Mans Cup. He finished twentieth at Spa, before retiring from the race in Portimão.

Bogle teamed up with Indy NXT rookie Nolan Siegel and amateur driver Charles Crews for the Asian Le Mans Series at the start of 2023. Driving for Inter Europol Competition in the LMP2 category, the season opener in Dubai would start out promisingly, with Crews taking pole position, although a comparatively slow stint saw Bogle lose positions during the middle part of the race. Siegel later got the team back up to podium places, before a wheel issue with under half an hour to go forced the team to retire. A turnaround came the following day, as Bogle seemed much more settled within the car, helping the team to take victory on Sunday.

=== GT World Challenge Europe ===
For 2025, Bogle would make a full move to sportscar racing, competing in the 2025 GT World Challenge Europe for Barwell Motorsport alongside co-drivers Bijoy Garg and Adam Ali.

== Racing record ==
=== Career summary ===
Season	Series	Team	Races	Wins	Poles	F/Laps	Podiums	Points	Position
2018	Formula 4 United States Championship	Jay Howard's Motorsports Driver Development	8	0	0	0	0	0	43rd
2018	Atlantic Championship		2	0	0	0	0	0	NC
2018	F2000 Championship		2	0	0	0	0	0	NC
2019	U.S. F2000 National Championship	Jay Howard Driver Development	15	0	0	0	0	93	17th
2019	Formula 4 United States Championship	Jay Howard Driver Development	11	2	0	0	2	54	10th
2020	U.S. F2000 National Championship	Jay Howard Driver Development	17	0	0	0	0	144	15th
2020	Formula 4 United States Championship	Jay Howard Driver Development	2	0	1	0	0	0	NC
2021	Formula Regional Americas Championship	Jay Howard Driver Development	8	0	0	0	0	41	15th
2021	Indy Lights	Carlin	20	0	0	0	0	227	11th
2022	Indy Lights	HMD Motorsports with Dale Coyne Racing	14	0	0	0	0	298	11th
2022	Le Mans Cup - LMP3	Team Virage	2	0	0	0	0	0	NC
2023	Asian Le Mans Series - LMP2	Inter Europol Competition	4	1	2	0	1	39	5th
2023	Indy NXT	HMD Motorsports with Dale Coyne Racing	14	0	0	0	0	266	11th
2023-24	Asian Le Mans Series - GT	Project 1	5	0	0	0	0	11	21st
2024	Indy NXT	HMD Motorsports	14	0	0	0	0	284	12th
2025	GT World Challenge Europe Endurance Cup	Barwell Motorsport	2	0	0	0	0	0	NC
2025	GT World Challenge Europe Sprint Cup	Barwell Motorsport	4	0	0	0	0	0	NC
2026	Formula Regional Americas Championship	Toney Driver Development	20	0	0	0	5	176.5	5th

^{*} Season still in progress.

=== Complete Formula 4 United States Championship results ===
(key) (Races in bold indicate pole position) (Races in italics indicate fastest lap)

Year	Entrant	1	2	3	4	5	6	7	8	9	10	11	12	13	14	15	16	17	18	DC	Points
2018	Jay Howard's Motorsports Driver Development	VIR; 1	VIR; 2	VIR; 3	ROA; 1	ROA; 2	ROA; 3	MOH; 1	MOH; 2	MOH; 3	PIT; 1; 23	PIT; 2; 20	PIT; 3; 20	NJMP; 1; 26	NJMP; 2; 20	NJMP; 3; 17	COTA; 1; 29	COTA; 2; 22		43rd	0
2019	Jay Howard Driver Development	ATL; 1; 19	ATL; 2; 14	ATL; 3; 15	PIT; 1	PIT; 2	PIT; 3	VIR; 1	VIR; 2	VIR; 3	MOH; 1; 10	MOH; 2; 16	MOH; 3 Ret	SEB; 1; 10	SEB; 2; 9	SEB; 3 Ret	COA; 1; 1	COA; 2; 1		10th	54
2020	Jay Howard Driver Development	MOH; 1 DSQ	MOH; 2 DSQ	VIR; 1 WD	VIR; 2 WD	VIR; 3 WD	BARR; 1	BARR; 2	BARR; 3	BARR; 4	SEB; 1	SEB; 2	SEB; 3	HMS; 1	HMS; 2	HMS; 3	COA; 1	COA; 2	COA; 3	41st	0

=== Complete Formula Regional Americas Championship results ===
(key) (Races in bold indicate pole position) (Races in italics indicate fastest lap)

Year	Entrant	1	2	3	4	5	6	7	8	9	10	11	12	13	14	15	16	17	18	19	20	21	DC	Points
2021	Jay Howard Driver Development	ATL; 1; 8	ATL; 2; 10	ATL; 3 NC	ROA; 1; 5	ROA; 2; 9	ROA; 3 DNS	MOH; 1; 4	MOH; 2; 7	MOH; 3; 7	BRA; 1	BRA; 2	BRA; 3	VIR; 1	VIR; 2	VIR; 3	COA; 1	COA; 2	COA; 3				15th	41
2026	Toney Driver Development	NOL; 1; 2	NOL; 2; 6	NOL; 3; 4	ROA; 1; 4	ROA; 2; 3	ROA; 3 C	MOH; 1; 5	ROH; 2; 3	IMS; 1; 8	IMS; 2 Ret	IMS; 3 Ret	NJM; 1; 3	NJM; 2; 6	NJM; 3; 4	MOS; 1; 10	MOS; 2; 7	MOS; 3; 4	VIR; 1 Ret	VIR; 2; 4	ALA; 1; 4	ALA; 2; 2	5th	176.5

=== American open–wheel racing results ===
==== U.S. F2000 National Championship ====
Year	Team	1	2	3	4	5	6	7	8	9	10	11	12	13	14	15	16	17	Rank	Points
2019	Jay Howard Driver Development	STP; 15	STP; 19	IMS; 16	IMS; 15	LOR; 15	ROA; 11	ROA; 15	TOR; 10	TOR; 13	MOH; 15	MOH; 15	POR; 16	POR; 18	LAG; 18	LAG; 14			17th	93
2020	Jay Howard Driver Development	ROA; 6	ROA; 9	MOH; 19	MOH; 14	MOH; 13	LOR; 16	IMS; 15	IMS; 15	IMS; 15	MOH; 11	MOH; 11	MOH; 13	NJM; 11	NJM; 12	NJM; 8	STP; 10	STP; 18	15th	144

==== Indy Lights / Indy NXT ====
Year	Team	1	2	3	4	5	6	7	8	9	10	11	12	13	14	15	16	17	18	19	20	Rank	Points
2021	Carlin	ALA; 10	ALA; 10	STP; 11	STP; 12	IMS; 12	IMS; 12	DET; 13	DET; 7	RDA; 9	RDA; 8	MOH; 10	MOH; 13	GTW; 8	GTW; 9	POR; 10	POR; 8	LAG; 11	LAG; 11	MOH; 12	MOH; 10	11th	227
2022	HMD Motorsports w/ Dale Coyne Racing	STP; 9	ALA; 14	IMS; 7	IMS; 14	DET; 4	DET; 14	RDA; 12	MOH; 8	IOW; 10	NSH; 7	GTW; 11	POR; 11	LAG; 9	LAG; 10							11th	298
2023	HMD Motorsports with Dale Coyne Racing	STP; 12	BAR; 7	IMS; 18	DET; 6	DET; 15	ROA; 13	MOH; 16	IOW; 13	NSH; 12	IMS; 13	GMP; 11	POR; 4	LAG; 11	LAG; 16							11th	266
2024	HMD Motorsports	STP; 10	BAR; 13	IMS; 9	IMS; 15	DET; 11	ROA; 14	LAG; 7	LAG; 8	MOH; 11	IOW; 6	GTW; 8	POR; 11	MIL; 14	NSH; 11							12th	284

=== Complete Asian Le Mans Series results ===
(key) (Races in bold indicate pole position) (Races in italics indicate fastest lap)

Year	Team	Class	Car	Engine	1	2	3	4	5	Pos.	Points
2023	Inter Europol Competition	LMP2	Oreca 07	Gibson GK428 4.2 L V8	**DUB**; **1** Ret	**DUB**; **2**; 1	ABU; 1; 4	ABU; 2 NC		5th	39
2023–24	Team Project 1	GT	BMW M4 GT3	BMW S58B30T0 3.0 L Turbo I6	SEP; 1; 18	SEP; 2; 10	DUB; 7	ABU; 1; 8	ABU; 2; 15	21st	11
