= Christian Brooks =

American racing driver (born 2000)

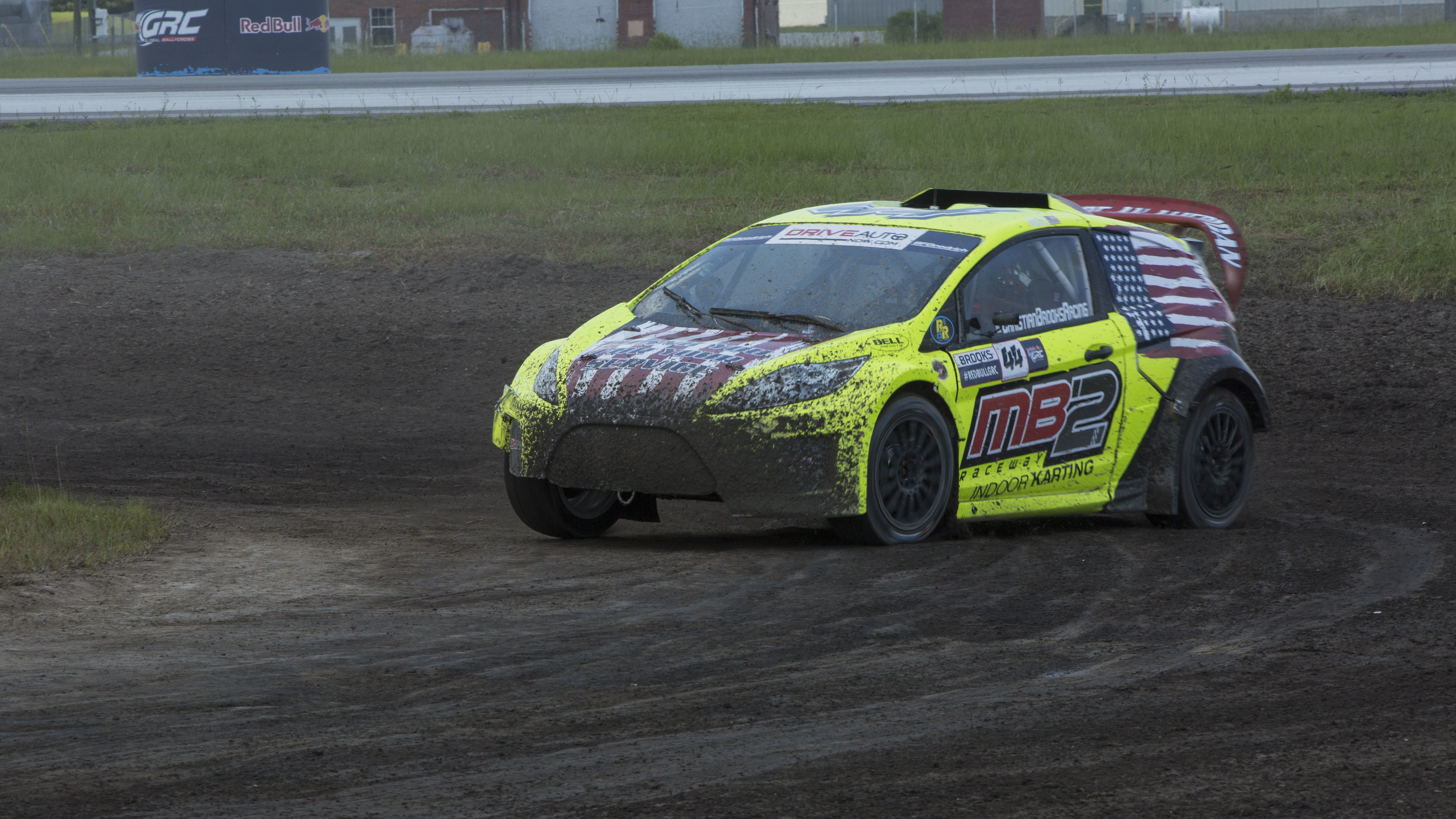
- Brooks competing in a Red Bull Global Rallycross event in 2016
- Nationality: (United States) American
- Born: September 29, 2000 (age 26); Santa Clarita, California, U.S.

Indy NXT career
- Debut season: 2024
- Current team: HMD Motorsports
- Car number: 39
- Starts: 5
- Championships: 0
- Wins: 0
- Podiums: 0
- Poles: 0
- Fastest laps: 0
- Best finish: TBD in 2024

Indy Pro 2000 Championship career
- Debut season: 2021
- Current team: Pabst Racing
- Car number: 19
- Starts: 18
- Championships: 0
- Wins: 1
- Podiums: 4
- Poles: 2
- Fastest laps: 0
- Best finish: 17th in 2021

Previous series
- 2020–21 2019: U.S. F2000 National Championship; Formula 4 United States Championship

Christian Brooks (born September 29, 2000) is an American racing driver. He most recently competed in the 2024 Indy NXT for HMD Motorsports and the 2024 USF Pro 2000 Championship driving for Pabst Racing. Brooks previously drove for Turn 3 Motorsport in the USF Pro 2000 Championship and previously competed in the USF2000 Championship with Exclusive Autosport.

== Career ==
=== Rallycross ===
==== 2017 ====
In 2017, Brooks competed in the Global RallyCross Championship driving for Dreyer & Reinbold Racing in GRC Lites. He took three wins and nine podiums en route to finish second in the standings.

==== 2018 ====
Brooks would return to rallycross with Dreyer & Reinbold Racing in 2018. He would compete in the newly formed Americas Rallycross Championship after the Global RallyCross Championship shut down at the end of 2017. He would finish second in the championship with four podiums in five races.

=== Formula 4 United States Championship ===
In 2019, Brooks would move up from karting to open-wheel racing driving for Jay Howard Driver Development in the Formula 4 United States Championship. Brooks would go on to have a competitive season with two wins and eight podiums finishing third in the championship.

=== USF2000 Championship ===
==== 2020 ====
On March 7, 2020, it was announced that Brooks would make his USF2000 Championship debut driving for Exclusive Autosport. At the final round of the season in St. Petersburg, Brooks would qualify in pole position for the first time all year and go on to get his first win in the series. He would finish fifth in the championship. Brooks won Rookie of the Year honors.

==== 2021 ====
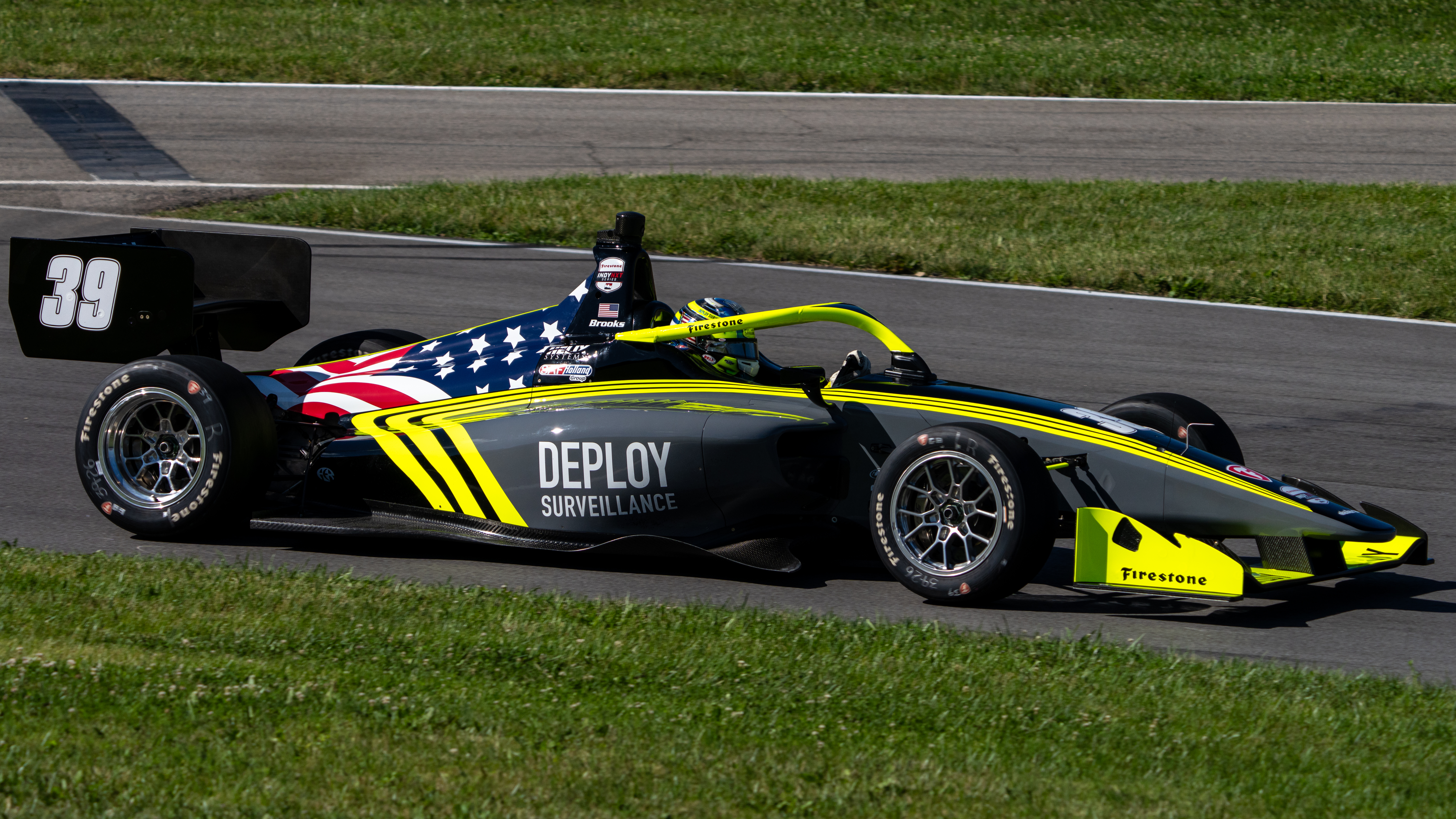
Brooks at Mid-Ohio Sports Car Course in 2024

Brooks would return to the series for the 2021 season once again driving for Exclusive Autosport. At the second round in St. Petersburg, he would take pole for the first race. Brooks would go on to win the race after a lengthy cleanup due to a major crash that took out six competitors. He would also win the second race at St. Petersburg after battling with Kiko Porto during the final laps of the race. Brooks would finish sixth in the championship with two poles, two wins, and four podiums.

== Racing record ==
=== Career summary ===
Season	Series	Team	Races	Wins	Poles	F/Laps	Podiums	Points	Position
2017	Global RallyCross Championship	Dreyer & Reinbold Racing	12	3	N/A	N/A	9	692	**2nd**
2018	Americas Rallycross Championship	Dreyer & Reinbold Racing	5	0	N/A	N/A	4	114	**2nd**
2019	Formula 4 United States Championship	Jay Howard Driver Development	16	2	0	2	8	209	**3rd**
2020	USF2000 Championship	Exclusive Autosport	17	1	0	0	3	284	5th
2021	USF2000 Championship	Exclusive Autosport	16	2	2	1	4	257	6th
2021	Indy Pro 2000 Championship	Exclusive Autosport	2	0	0	0	0	34	17th
2022	Indy Pro 2000 Championship	Exclusive Autosport	0	0	0	0	0	0	NC
2023	USF Pro 2000 Championship	Turn 3 Motorsport	4	1	1	0	1	79	22nd
2024	USF Pro 2000 Championship	Pabst Racing	14	0	1	0	4	232	6th
2024	Indy NXT	HMD Motorsports	8	0	0	0	0	208	16th
2025	Formula Regional Americas Championship	Toney Driver Development	2	2	1	2	2	50	10th

*Season still in progress.

=== Complete Formula 4 United States Championship results ===
(key) (Races in bold indicate pole position) (Races in italics indicate fastest lap) (Races with * indicate most race laps led)

Year	Team	1	2	3	4	5	6	7	8	9	10	11	12	13	14	15	16	17	Rank	Points
2019	Jay Howard Driver Development	ATL; 1 DSQ	ATL; 2; 6	ATL; 3; 6	PIT; 1; 9	PIT; 2; 2	PIT; 3; 2	VIR; 1; 11	VIR; 2; 3	VIR; 3; 1	MOH; 1; 8	MOH; 2; 4	MOH; 3; 2	SEB; 1; 4	SEB; 2; 1	SEB; 3; 6	COA; 1; 2	COA; 2; 2	3rd	209

=== Complete Formula Regional Americas Championship results ===
(key) (Races in bold indicate pole position) (Races in italics indicate fastest lap)

Year	Team	1	2	3	4	5	6	7	8	9	10	11	12	13	14	15	16	17	18	19	20	21	22	DC	Points
2025	Toney Driver Development	NOL; 1	NOL; 2	NOL; 3	ROA; 1	ROA; 2	ROA; 3	IMS; 1	IMS; 2	IMS; 3	MOH; 1	MOH; 2	MOH; 3	NJM; 1	NJM; 2	NJM; 3	MOS; 1	MOS; 2	MOS; 3	**VIR**; **1**; 1	VIR; 2; 1	BAR; 1	BAR; 2	10th	50

=== American open-wheel racing results ===
==== USF2000 Championship ====
(key) (Races in bold indicate pole position) (Races in italics indicate fastest lap) (Races with * indicate most race laps led)

Year	Team	1	2	3	4	5	6	7	8	9	10	11	12	13	14	15	16	17	18	Rank	Points
2020	Exclusive Autosport	ROA; 1; 8	ROA; 2; 20	MOH; 1; 6	MOH; 2; 5	MOH; 3; 4	LOR; 5	IMS; 1; 9	IMS; 2; 3	IMS; 3; 2	MOH; 4; 4	MOH; 5; 4	MOH; 6; 8	NJMP; 1; 4	NJMP; 2; 7	NJMP; 3; 5	STP; 1; 20	STP; 2; **1***		5th	284
2021	Exclusive Autosport	ALA; 1; 5	ALA; 2; 5	STP; 1; **1***	STP; 2; 1	IMS; 1; **3***	IMS; 2; 5	IMS; 3 DSQ	LOR; 5	ROA; 1; 5	ROA; 2; 20	MOH; 1; 11	MOH; 2; 8	MOH; 3; 6	NJMP; 1; 3	NJMP; 2; 10	NJMP; 3; 17	MOH; 1	MOH; 2	6th	257

==== Indy Pro 2000 Championship / USF Pro 2000 Championship ====
(key) (Races in bold indicate pole position) (Races in italics indicate fastest lap) (Races with * indicate most race laps led)

Year	Team	1	2	3	4	5	6	7	8	9	10	11	12	13	14	15	16	17	18	Rank	Points
2021	Exclusive Autosport	ALA; 1	ALA; 2	STP; 1	STP; 2	IMS; 1	IMS; 2	IMS; 3	LOR	ROA; 1	ROA; 2	MOH; 1	MOH; 2	GMP	NJMP; 1	NJMP; 2	NJMP; 3	MOH; 3; 5	MOH; 4; 5	17th	34
2022	Exclusive Autosport	STP; 1 DNS	STP; 2 DNS	ALA; 1	ALA; 2	IMS; 1	IMS; 2	IMS; 3	IRP	ROA; 1	ROA; 2	MOH; 1	MOH; 2	TOR; 1	TOR; 2	GMP	POR; 1	POR; 2	POR; 3	—	0
2023	Turn 3 Motorsport	**STP**; **1**; 1*	STP; 2; 6	SEB; 1	SEB; 2	IMS; 1	IMS; 2	IRP	ROA; 1	ROA; 2	MOH; 1	MOH; 2	TOR; 1; 8	TOR; 2; 4	COA; 1	COA; 2	POR; 1	POR; 2	POR; 3	22nd	79
2024	Pabst Racing	STP; 1; 2	STP; 2; 5	LOU; 1; 8	LOU; 2; 10	LOU; 3; 7	IMS; 1; 8	IMS; 2; 5	IMS; 3; 7	IRP; 11	ROA; 1; 5	ROA; 2; 2	**ROA**; **3**; 2	MOH; 1; 3	MOH; 2; 18	TOR; 1	TOR; 2	POR; 1	POR; 2	6th	232

*Season still in progress.

==== Indy NXT ====
Year	Team	1	2	3	4	5	6	7	8	9	10	11	12	13	14	Rank	Points
2024	HMD Motorsports	STP	BAR	IMS	IMS	DET	RDA	LGA; 8	LGA; 7	MOH; 5	IOW; 5	GMP; 7	POR; 5	MIL; 10	NSH; 9	16th	208
