= Arthur Leist (racing driver) =

Brazilian racing driver (born 2001)

- Nationality: (Brazil) Brazilian
- Born: 18 June 2001 (age 25) Novo Hamburgo, Brazil
- Relatives: Matheus Leist (brother)

Stock Car Pro Series career
- Debut season: 2023
- Current team: Crown Racing
- Car number: 81
- Starts: 26
- Wins: 0
- Poles: 0
- Fastest laps: 1
- Best finish: 19th in 2024

Previous series
- 2020-2022 2018-2019: Stock Series; Formula 4 United States Championship

Arthur Leist (born 18 June 2001) is a Brazilian auto racing driver. He currently drives an Toyota Corolla Cross for Crown Racing in the Stock Car Pro Series. His debut in motorsport was in 2018 in Formula 4 United States Championship, then moved to Stock Light back in 2020, when was third place in 2022. In 2024, he moved up to Stock Car Pro Series with Full Time Sports,. For 2025, he was announced as Crown Racing driver. He did sporadic rounds in the TCR South America Touring Car Championship and Império Endurance Brasil.

== Career ==
=== Formula 4 United States Championship ===
Leist's debut in single seater racing was in the 2018 Formula 4 United States Championship season, driving for Crosslink Kiwi Motorsport, where he achieved two podiums and an fastest lap. For the next year. he returned with the same team and finished the season in fourth place with two wins, four poles and four podiums.

=== Stock Light Brasil ===
After two years racing in American motorsport, Leist returned to Brazil to race in Stock Light, the Stock Car Pro Series feeder series. He joined Mortech Motorsport for the 2020 season and the following years 2021 and 2022, in the meantime, he achieved six wins, three pole positions, eight fastest laps and 20 podiums, and finished third place in 2022.

=== Endurance Brasil and TCR ===
Between 2020 and 2024, Leist did rounds in Império Endurance Brasil and TCR South America Touring Car Championship, in 2020 he did two rounds in different cars, driving an Metalmoro JLM AJR on P1 class for Mc Tubarão team and an Metalmoro MRX on P3 class for Motocar racing, in 2021, he returned to Endurance Brasil with Power Imports team and did four races with an Metalmoro AJR gaining one podium. In 2024, he raced with an Lynk & Co 03 as guest driver with Full Time Sports in TCR South America.

=== Stock Car Pro Series ===
Leist's debut in the major Brazilian motorsport series was in the 2022 Stock Car Pro Series season as a guest driver with Felipe Baptista. In 2023, he did one round with Full Time Sports, where he got a full-time seat for the 2024 Stock Car Pro Series season. For 2025, he moved on to Crown Racing, achieving two third places as the season goes on.

== Racing record ==
=== Racing career summary ===
Season	Series	Team	Races	Wins	Poles	F/Laps	Podiums	Points	Position
2017	Fórmula 3 Brasil - Academy Class	Cesário F3	0	0	0	0	0	0	NC
2018	Formula 4 United States Championship	Crosslink Kiwi Motorsport	17	0	0	1	2	73	9th
2019	Formula 4 United States Championship	Crosslink Kiwi Motorsport	16	2	4	3	4	126	4th
2020	Império Endurance Brasil - P1	Mc Tubarão	1	0	0	0	1	?	?
2020	Império Endurance Brasil - P3	Motocar racing	1	0	1	1	0	?	?
2020	Stock Light Brasil	Mortech Motorsport	12	1	1	1	2	179	5th
2021	Stock Light Brasil	Mortech Motorsport	16	0	1	2	7	259	4th
2022	Stock Car Pro Series	Full Time Sports	1	0	0	0	0	?	?
2022	Império Endurance Brasil - P1	Power imports	4	0	0	0	1	?	?
2022	Stock Series	Mortech Motorsport	16	5	1	6	11	310	3rd
2023	Stock Car Pro Series	Texaco Racing	2	0	0	0	0	9	32nd
2024	TCR South America Touring Car Championship	PMO Full Time Sports	1	0	0	0	0	24	37th
2024	TCR Brazil Touring Car Championship	PMO Full Time Sports	1	0	0	0	0	24	21st
2024	Stock Car Pro Series	Full Time Sports	24	0	0	1	0	553	19th
2025	Stock Car Pro Series	Crown Racing	9	0	0	0	2	283	7th*

* Season still in progress.
