= 2019 Formula 4 United States Championship =

Motor racing competition

Seasons
- ← 2018 2020 →

The 2019 Formula 4 United States Championship season was the fourth season of the United States Formula 4 Championship, a motor racing series regulated according to FIA Formula 4 regulations and sanctioned by SCCA Pro Racing, the professional racing division of the Sports Car Club of America.

== Teams and drivers ==
All teams were American-registered.

| Team | No. | Driver | Rounds |
|---|---|---|---|
| Harris Hill Driver Development | 2 | (United States) Jake Bonilla | 6 |
| Jensen Global Advisors | 2 | (Mexico) Íñigo León | 1 |
| DEForce Racing | 2 | (Mexico) Pablo Pérez de Lara | 5 |
| DEForce Racing | 12 | (Brazil) Kiko Porto | All |
| DEForce Racing | 77 | (United States) Kory Enders | 6 |
| DEForce Racing | 88 | (Mexico) Chara Mansur | 6 |
| DEForce Racing | 99 | (Brazil) Guilherme Peixoto | All |
| Jay Howard Driver Development | 3 | (United States) Hayden Bowlsbey | All |
| Jay Howard Driver Development | 4 | (United States) Christian Brooks | All |
| Jay Howard Driver Development | 5 | (United States) Wyatt Brichacek | All |
| Jay Howard Driver Development | 6 | (Canada) Robert Soroka | 1, 4–5 |
| Jay Howard Driver Development | 6 | (United States) Zoey Edenholm | 6 |
| Jay Howard Driver Development | 7 | (United States) Christian Bogle | 1, 4–6 |
| Jay Howard Driver Development | 8 | (United Kingdom) Jonny Wilkinson | 1 |
| Jay Howard Driver Development | 8 | (United States) Nolan Siegel | 6 |
| Crosslink/Kiwi Motorsport | 9 | (Australia) Joshua Car | All |
| Crosslink/Kiwi Motorsport | 18 | (Brazil) Arthur Leist | All |
| Crosslink/Kiwi Motorsport | 27 | (United States) Liam Snyder | 4 |
| Crosslink/Kiwi Motorsport | 32 | (Puerto Rico) José Blanco | All |
| Crosslink/Kiwi Motorsport | 47 | (United States) Dante Yu | 1–3, 6 |
| Crosslink/Kiwi Motorsport | 57 | (United States) Josh Sarchet | 6 |
| Primus Racing | 11 | (United States) James Goughary Jr. | 5 |
| Primus Racing | 13 | (China) Sicheng Li | 3–6 |
| Primus Racing | 44 | (United States) Aidan Yoder | All |
| Primus Racing | 69 | (New Zealand) Josh Bethune | All |
| Alliance Racing Sponsored by Gas Monkey Energy Drink | 14 | (United States) Dylan Tavella | All |
| Alliance Racing Sponsored by Gas Monkey Energy Drink | 15 | (United States) Chandler Horton | All |
| Alliance Racing Sponsored by Gas Monkey Energy Drink | 16 | (Canada) Ryan MacDermid | 1–4 |
| Alliance Racing Sponsored by Gas Monkey Energy Drink | 24 | (United States) Zoey Edenholm | 1–5 |
| Alliance Racing Sponsored by Gas Monkey Energy Drink | 28 | (United States) Will Edwards | All |
| Alliance Racing Sponsored by Gas Monkey Energy Drink | 53 | (United Kingdom) Tommy Foster | 6 |
| Group-A Racing | 17 | (United States) Robert Torres | 5–6 |
| Group-A Racing | 93 | (United States) David Porcelli | 1–4 |
| Group-A Racing | 93 | (United States) David Dalton Jr. | 5–6 |
| Group-A Racing | 96 | (United States) Shehan Chandrasoma | 6 |
| Quantum Racing Services | 20 | (United States) Matt Rivard | All |
| DC Autosport with Cape Motorsports | 21 | (United Kingdom) Teddy Wilson | 1–3 |
| DC Autosport with Cape Motorsports | 21 | (Bolivia) Rodrigo Gutiérrez | 5–6 |
| DC Autosport with Cape Motorsports | 26 | (United States) Ryan McElwee | 1–2 |
| DC Autosport with Cape Motorsports | 26 | (United States) Reece Gold | 5–6 |
| DC Autosport with Cape Motorsports | 51 | (United States) Nicky Hays | 3–4, 6 |
| DC Autosport with Cape Motorsports | 88 | (United States) Giano Taurino | 2 |
| World Speed Motorsports | 25 | (United States) Courtney Crone | 6 |
| World Speed Motorsports | 33 | (United States) Amanda Cartier | 6 |
| World Speed Motorsports | 55 | (United States) Kyle Loh | 6 |
| Velocity Racing Development | 61 | (United States) Michael d'Orlando | 3–6 |
| Velocity Racing Development | 62 | (United Kingdom) Oliver Clarke | 1–2 |
| Velocity Racing Development | 66 | (Canada) Ryan MacDermid | 5–6 |
| Doran Motorsports Group | 95 | (Canada) Marco Kacic | 6 |

== Race calendar ==
All races will be held on permanent road courses in the United States. The series schedule was announced on 7 December 2018.

| Round | | Circuit | Date | Pole position | Fastest lap | Winning driver | Winning team | Supporting |
|---|---|---|---|---|---|---|---|---|
| 1 | R1 | Road Atlanta, Braselton | 19 April | (Australia) Joshua Car (Note: Heavy rains cancelled the qualifying session. Starting grid was set based on fastest times from the practice sessions.) | (United Kingdom) Jonny Wilkinson | (United Kingdom) Teddy Wilson | DC Autosport with Cape Motorsports | F3 Americas Championship; Formula Race Promotions |
| 1 | R2 | Road Atlanta, Braselton | 20 April | | (United States) Aidan Yoder | (Brazil) Kiko Porto | DEForce Racing | F3 Americas Championship; Formula Race Promotions |
| 1 | R3 | Road Atlanta, Braselton | 20 April | | (Brazil) Arthur Leist | (Australia) Joshua Car | Crosslink/Kiwi Motorsport | F3 Americas Championship; Formula Race Promotions |
| 2 | R4 | Pittsburgh International Race Complex, Wampum | 22 June | (Brazil) Arthur Leist | (Brazil) Arthur Leist | (Brazil) Arthur Leist | Crosslink/Kiwi Motorsport | F3 Americas Championship |
| 2 | R5 | Pittsburgh International Race Complex, Wampum | 23 June | | (United States) Dylan Tavella | (Brazil) Kiko Porto | DEForce Racing | F3 Americas Championship |
| 2 | R6 | Pittsburgh International Race Complex, Wampum | 23 June | | (United States) Christian Brooks | (Australia) Joshua Car | Crosslink/Kiwi Motorsport | F3 Americas Championship |
| 3 | R7 | Virginia International Raceway, Alton | 27 July | (Brazil) Arthur Leist | (Puerto Rico) José Blanco | (Australia) Joshua Car | Crosslink/Kiwi Motorsport | F3 Americas Championship; Formula Race Promotions |
| 3 | R8 | Virginia International Raceway, Alton | 28 July | | (Brazil) Arthur Leist | (Brazil) Arthur Leist | Crosslink/Kiwi Motorsport | F3 Americas Championship; Formula Race Promotions |
| 3 | R9 | Virginia International Raceway, Alton | 28 July | | (Brazil) Guilherme Peixoto | (United States) Christian Brooks | Jay Howard Driver Development | F3 Americas Championship; Formula Race Promotions |
| 4 | R10 | Mid-Ohio Sports Car Course, Lexington | 9 August | (Brazil) Guilherme Peixoto | (Australia) Joshua Car | (Brazil) Kiko Porto | DEForce Racing | NASCAR Xfinity Series; Trans-Am Series |
| 4 | R11 | Mid-Ohio Sports Car Course, Lexington | 9 August | | (Australia) Joshua Car | (Australia) Joshua Car | Crosslink/Kiwi Motorsport | NASCAR Xfinity Series; Trans-Am Series |
| 4 | R12 | Mid-Ohio Sports Car Course, Lexington | 10 August | | (Australia) Joshua Car | (Australia) Joshua Car | Crosslink/Kiwi Motorsport | NASCAR Xfinity Series; Trans-Am Series |
| 5 | R13 | Sebring International Raceway, Sebring | 14 September | (Puerto Rico) José Blanco | (Puerto Rico) José Blanco | (Puerto Rico) José Blanco | Crosslink/Kiwi Motorsport | F3 Americas Championship |
| 5 | R14 | Sebring International Raceway, Sebring | 14 September | | (Puerto Rico) José Blanco | (United States) Christian Brooks | Jay Howard Driver Development | F3 Americas Championship |
| 5 | R15 | Sebring International Raceway, Sebring | 15 September | | (Australia) Joshua Car | (Australia) Joshua Car | Crosslink/Kiwi Motorsport | F3 Americas Championship |
| 6 | R16 | Circuit of the Americas, Austin | 2 November | (Puerto Rico) José Blanco | (Australia) Joshua Car | (United States) Christian Bogle | Jay Howard Driver Development | Formula One |
| 6 | R17 | Circuit of the Americas, Austin | 3 November | | (United States) Christian Brooks | (United States) Christian Bogle (Note: Race winner Christian Brooks received a post race penalty for "crowding", promoting Bogle to the victory.) | Jay Howard Driver Development | Formula One |

== Championship standings ==
Points were awarded as follows:

| Position | **1st** | **2nd** | **3rd** | **4th** | **5th** | **6th** | **7th** | **8th** | **9th** | **10th** |
| Points | 25 | 18 | 15 | 12 | 10 | 8 | 6 | 4 | 2 | 1 |

=== Drivers' standings ===
| Pos | Driver | ATL | | | PIT | | | VIR | | | MOH | | | SEB | | | COA | | Pts |
|---|---|---|---|---|---|---|---|---|---|---|---|---|---|---|---|---|---|---|---|
| 1 | (Australia) Joshua Car | **3** | 3 | 1 | 2 | 3 | 1 | 1 | 2 | 2 | 2 | 1 | 1 | 2 | 4 | 1 | 29† | 9 | 299 |
| 2 | (Brazil) Kiko Porto | 2 | 1 | 3 | 4 | 1 | 4 | 3 | 4 | 11 | 1 | 9 | 5 | 3 | 7 | 2 | Ret | 5 | 220 |
| 3 | (United States) Christian Brooks | DSQ | 6 | 6 | 9 | 2 | 2 | 11 | 3 | 1 | 8 | 4 | 2 | 4 | 1 | 6 | 2 | 2 | 209 |
| 4 | (Puerto Rico) José Blanco | 6 | 2 | 4 | 3 | Ret | 3 | 2 | 7 | Ret | 9 | 7 | Ret | **1** | 2 | 3 | **28** | 26 | 158 |
| 5 | (Brazil) Arthur Leist | 5 | 19 | 2 | **1** | 5 | 10 | **4** | 1 | 3 | 5 | Ret | Ret | 5 | DNS | 5 | 6 | 11 | 154 |
| 6 | (Brazil) Guilherme Peixoto | 7 | 17 | 10 | 7 | 7 | 9 | 9 | 5 | 8 | **4** | 3 | 3 | Ret | 8 | 4 | 4 | Ret | 107 |
| 7 | (United States) Dylan Tavella | 4 | 9 | Ret | 6 | 4 | DSQ | 8 | Ret | DNS | 11 | Ret | 4 | 8 | 3 | 8 | 26 | Ret | 73 |
| 8 | (United Kingdom) Teddy Wilson | 1 | 5 | 7 | 5 | 9 | 7 | 5 | Ret | Ret | | | | | | | | | 69 |
| 9 | (United States) Nicky Hays | | | | | | | 6 | 12 | Ret | 3 | 2 | 15 | | | | 8 | 4 | 57 |
| 10 | (United States) Christian Bogle | 19 | 14 | 15 | | | | | | | 10 | 16 | Ret | 10 | 9 | Ret | 1 | 1 | 54 |
| 11 | (Canada) Ryan MacDermid | 10 | 10 | 12 | 11 | 6 | 5 | 12 | 8 | 6 | 18 | 8 | DNS | 12 | 19 | 7 | 31 | 7 | 48 |
| 12 | (United States) Wyatt Brichacek | 22† | 8 | 8 | 13 | Ret | 19 | 7 | Ret | 7 | 6 | 5 | Ret | 24 | 15 | 11 | DNS | 6 | 46 |
| 13 | (United States) Chandler Horton | 12 | 4 | 11 | Ret | 16 | 13 | 15 | Ret | DNS | 13 | 10 | 7 | 7 | 6 | 10 | 5 | 29 | 44 |
| 14 | (United States) Michael d'Orlando | | | | | | | 10 | 14 | 5 | 7 | 14 | 6 | 23 | Ret | Ret | 30† | 3 | 40 |
| 15 | (United States) Dante Yu | 14 | 21 | Ret | 8 | Ret | Ret | 13 | 6 | 4 | | | | | | | 24 | 14 | 24 |
| 16 | (United States) Kory Enders | | | | | | | | | | | | | | | | 3 | 13 | 15 |
| 17 | (United States) James Goughary Jr. | | | | | | | | | | | | | 9 | 5 | 20† | | | 12 |
| 18 | (United States) Reece Gold | | | | | | | | | | | | | 6 | Ret | 16 | 12 | 8 | 12 |
| 19 | (United States) Giano Taurino | | | | 16 | 8 | 6 | | | | | | | | | | | | 12 |
| 20 | (United Kingdom) Oliver Clarke | Ret | 11 | 5 | 10 | 18 | 16 | | | | | | | | | | | | 11 |
| 21 | (United States) David Porcelli | 9 | 7 | 9 | 15 | 11 | 15 | Ret | Ret | DNS | 12 | Ret | 12 | | | | | | 10 |
| 22 | (United States) Liam Snyder | | | | | | | | | | 17 | 6 | Ret | | | | | | 8 |
| 23 | (New Zealand) Josh Bethune | 15 | 12 | 13 | 12 | 10 | 8 | DNS | 10 | Ret | 20 | 13 | DNS | 11 | 13 | 9 | 17 | 15 | 8 |
| 24 | (United States) Nolan Siegel | | | | | | | | | | | | | | | | 7 | 10 | 7 |
| 25 | (United States) Hayden Bowlsbey | 16 | 16 | 14 | 18 | 12 | 12 | 18 | 17 | 12 | 14 | Ret | 8 | Ret | 11 | 13 | 10 | 20 | 5 |
| 26 | (United Kingdom) Jonny Wilkinson | 8 | 13 | 18 | | | | | | | | | | | | | | | 4 |
| 27 | (United States) Aidan Yoder | 18 | 15 | 21† | 20 | Ret | Ret | Ret | 13 | Ret | 15 | Ret | 11 | 13 | 10 | Ret | 9 | 18 | 3 |
| 28 | (China) Sicheng Li | | | | | | | Ret | 15 | 10 | 22 | 15 | 9 | 20 | Ret | DNS | 22 | Ret | 3 |
| 29 | (United States) Matt Rivard | 13 | Ret | 16 | 17 | 17 | 14 | 14 | 11 | 9 | DNS | DNS | DNS | 18 | 16 | 14 | DNS | DNS | 2 |
| 30 | (United States) Zoey Edenholm | 17 | 18 | 19 | 14 | 14 | 17 | 17 | 9 | Ret | 19 | 12 | 13 | 15 | 20 | 18 | 13 | 17 | 2 |
| 31 | (Canada) Robert Soroka | 21 | 20 | 22 | | | | | | | 16 | 11 | 10 | 14 | 14 | Ret | | | 1 |
| 32 | (United States) Ryan McElwee | 11 | Ret | 17 | Ret | 13 | 11 | | | | | | | | | | | | 0 |
| 33 | (Canada) Marco Kacic | | | | | | | | | | | | | | | | 11 | 16 | 0 |
| 34 | (Mexico) Pablo Pérez de Lara | | | | | | | | | | | | | 16 | 12 | 21 | | | 0 |
| 35 | (United States) David Dalton Jr. | | | | | | | | | | | | | 17 | 18 | 12 | 19 | 19 | 0 |
| 36 | (United Kingdom) Tommy Foster | | | | | | | | | | | | | | | | 18 | 12 | 0 |
| 37 | (United States) Will Edwards | 20 | 22 | 20 | 19 | 15 | 18 | 16 | 16 | DNS | 21 | Ret | 14 | 22 | DSQ | 19 | 25 | 28 | 0 |
| 38 | (United States) Kyle Loh | | | | | | | | | | | | | | | | 14 | 22 | 0 |
| 39 | (Bolivia) Rodrigo Gutiérrez | | | | | | | | | | | | | 19 | 17 | 15 | 20 | 25 | 0 |
| 40 | (United States) Courtney Crone | | | | | | | | | | | | | | | | 15 | 21 | 0 |
| 41 | (Mexico) Chara Mansur | | | | | | | | | | | | | | | | 16 | 27 | 0 |
| 42 | (United States) Robert Torres | | | | | | | | | | | | | 21 | 21 | 17 | DNS | 31 | 0 |
| 43 | (United States) Jake Bonilla | | | | | | | | | | | | | | | | 21 | 23 | 0 |
| 44 | (United States) Josh Sarchet | | | | | | | | | | | | | | | | 23 | 24 | 0 |
| 45 | (United States) Amanda Cartier | | | | | | | | | | | | | | | | 27 | 30 | 0 |
| — | (United States) Shehan Chandrasoma | | | | | | | | | | | | | | | | Ret | Ret | 0 |
| — | (Mexico) Íñigo León | DNS | DNS | DNS | | | | | | | | | | | | | | | — |
| Pos | Driver | ATL | | | PIT | | | VIR | | | MOH | | | SEB | | | COA | | Pts |

| Colour | Result |
|---|---|
| Gold | Winner |
| Silver | Second place |
| Bronze | Third place |
| Green | Points classification |
| Blue | Non-points classification |
| Blue | Non-classified finish (NC) |
| Purple | Retired, not classified (Ret) |
| Red | Did not qualify (DNQ) |
| Red | Did not pre-qualify (DNPQ) |
| Black | Disqualified (DSQ) |
| White | Did not start (DNS) |
| White | Withdrew (WD) |
| White | Race cancelled (C) |
| Blank | Did not practice (DNP) |
| Blank | Did not arrive (DNA) |
| Blank | Excluded (EX) |

**Bold** – Pole
Italics – Fastest Lap
† — Did not finish, but classified

=== Teams' standings ===
| Pos | Team | Pts |
|---|---|---|
| 1 | Crosslink Kiwi Motorsports | 537 |
| 2 | DEForce Racing | 342 |
| 3 | Jay Howard Driver Development | 308 |
| 4 | Alliance Racing w/ Gas Monkey | 155 |
| 5 | DC Autosports w/ Cape Motorsports | 150 |
| 6 | Velocity Racing Development | 63 |
| 7 | Primus Racing | 26 |
| 8 | Group-A Racing | 10 |
| 9 | Quantum Racing Services | 2 |
| 10 | Doran Motorsports Group | 0 |
| 11 | World Speed Motorsports | 0 |
| 12 | Harris Hill Driver Development | 0 |
| 13 | Jensen Global Advisors | 0 |
