= Wyatt Brichacek =

American racing driver (born 2000)

- Brichacek in 2026
- Nationality: (United States) American
- Born: October 23, 2000 (age 26) Noblesville, Indiana, U.S.

European Le Mans Series career
- Debut season: 2023
- Current team: DKR Engineering
- Categorisation: FIA Silver
- Car number: 4
- Former teams: Inter Europol Competition
- Starts: 17 (17 entries)
- Wins: 0
- Podiums: 3
- Poles: 2
- Fastest laps: 5
- Best finish: 4th (LMP3) in 2023

Previous series
- 2021–22 2019–20 2018–19: Indy Pro 2000 Championship; U.S. F2000 National Championship; F4 US Championship

Wyatt Brichacek (born October 23, 2000) is an American racing driver who competes in the European Le Mans Series and in the 2025 Le Mans Cup in LMP3 driving for DKR Engineering.

== Career ==
=== Lower formulae ===
Brichacek began competing in the Formula 4 United States Championship in 2018, taking part in the full season with Jay Howard Driver Development. He signed on for a second season in 2019.

=== Road to Indy ===
Brichacek debuted on the Road to Indy in late 2019, taking part in a one-off weekend in the U.S. F2000 National Championship. For 2020, Brichacek embarked upon a full-season drive in the series. The following season, he stepped up to the Indy Pro 2000 Championship. Returning for a sophomore season with Jay Howard Driver Development in 2022, Brichacek began the season by taking top honors in the pre-season test at Homestead-Miami Speedway. Mid-way through his 2022 season, Brichacek switched from Jay Howard Driver Development to Exclusive Autosport at the Road America rounds.

=== Sports car racing ===
In 2023, Brichacek began driving for Inter Europol Competition in the Asian Le Mans Series, competing in the LMP3 class. Brichacek continued with the team for the 2023 European Le Mans Series season, once again in the LMP3 ranks. Alongside Miguel Cristóvão and Kai Askey, Brichacek claimed two class podium finishes en route to a fourth-place finish in the championship. Brichacek additionally scored a class pole at Aragón, although the team would fail to finish the race.

== Racing record ==
=== Racing career summary ===
Season	Series	Team	Races	Wins	Poles	F/Laps	Podiums	Points	Position
2017	Lucas Oil Formula Car Race Series		6	0	0	0	0	140	16th
2018	Formula 4 United States Championship	Jay Howard's Motorsport Driver Development	17	0	0	0	0	16	17th
2019	Formula 4 United States Championship	Jay Howard Driver Development	16	0	0	0	0	46	12th
2019	U.S. F2000 National Championship	Jay Howard Driver Development	2	0	0	0	0	16	24th
2020	U.S. F2000 National Championship	Jay Howard Driver Development	17	0	0	0	0	113	16th
2020	Formula Pro USA F4 Winter Series	Jay Howard Driver Development	1	1	1	1	1	29	7th
2021	Indy Pro 2000 Championship	Jay Howard Driver Development	18	0	0	0	0	212	10th
2022	Indy Pro 2000 Championship	Jay Howard Driver Development	8	0	0	2	0	160	13th
2022	Indy Pro 2000 Championship	Exclusive Autosport	6	0	0	0	0	160	13th
2023	Asian Le Mans Series - LMP3	Inter Europol Competition	4	0	0	0	0	12	13th
2023	European Le Mans Series - LMP3	Inter Europol Competition	6	0	1	0	2	57	4th
2023	Michelin Pilot Challenge - GS	van der Steur Racing	1	0	0	0	0	190	52nd
2024	Prototype Winter Series - Class 3	DKR Engineering	2	0	1	0	1	11.43	9th
2024	European Le Mans Series - LMP3	DKR Engineering	6	0	1	3	1	53	6th
2024	Le Mans Cup - LMP3	WTM by Rinaldi Racing	2	0	0	1	0	6	25th
2024	Ultimate Cup Series - Proto P3	RLR MSport	1	1	0	0	1	25	14th
2025	Le Mans Cup - LMP3	DKR Engineering	7	0	0	0	0	9	17th
2025	European Le Mans Series - LMP3	DKR Engineering	6	0	0	0	1	41	10th
2025	GT World Challenge Europe Endurance Cup	Saintéloc Racing	1	0	0	0	0	0	NC
2025	GT World Challenge Europe Endurance Cup - Silver	Saintéloc Racing	1	0	0	0	1	26	15th
2025	IMSA SportsCar Championship - GTD	Lone Star Racing	3	0	0	0	0	495	44th
2026	IMSA VP Racing SportsCar Challenge - LMP3	Toney Driver Development	8	5	4	5	6	2540	5th
2026	European Le Mans Series - LMP3	DKR Engineering	5	0	0	0	1	42	10th
2026	Le Mans Cup - LMP3	Nielsen Racing	1	0	0	0	0	0	37th
2026	GT World Challenge Europe Endurance Cup	Team RJN	1	0	0	0	0	0	NC
2026	GT World Challenge America - Pro-Am	JMF Motorsports	1	0	0	0	0	0	NC†

^{*} Season still in progress.

=== Complete Formula 4 United States Championship results ===
(key) (Races in bold indicate pole position) (Races in italics indicate fastest lap)

Year	Entrant	1	2	3	4	5	6	7	8	9	10	11	12	13	14	15	16	17	DC	Points
2018	Jay Howard's Motorsport Driver Development	VIR; 1; 8	VIR; 2; 9	VIR; 3; 17	ROA; 1; 19	ROA; 2; 28	ROA; 3 Ret	MOH; 1; 12	MOH; 2; 15	MOH; 3 Ret	PIT; 1 Ret	PIT; 2 Ret	PIT; 3; 14	NJMP; 1; 16	NJMP; 2; 12	NJMP; 3; 15	COTA; 1; 12	COTA; 2; 5	17th	16
2019	Jay Howard Driver Development	ATL; 22†	ATL; 8	ATL; 8	PIT; 13	PIT; Ret	PIT; 19	VIR; 7	VIR; Ret	VIR; 7	MOH; 6	MOH; 5	MOH; Ret	SEB; 24	SEB; 15	SEB; 11	COA; DNS	COA; 6	12th	46

=== American open–wheel racing results ===
==== U.S. F2000 National Championship ====
Year	Team	1	2	3	4	5	6	7	8	9	10	11	12	13	14	15	16	17	Rank	Points
2019	Jay Howard Driver Development	STP; 1	STP; 2	IMS; 1	IMS; 2	LOR	ROA; 1	ROA; 2	TOR; 1	TOR; 1	MOH; 1	MOH; 2	POR; 1	POR; 2	LAG; 1; 8	LAG; 2; 18			24th	16
2020	Jay Howard Driver Development	ROA; 1; 16	ROA; 2; 17	MOH; 1; 12	MOH; 2; 20	MOH; 3; 12	LOR; 18	IMS; 1; 12	IMS; 2; 17	IMS; 3; 13	MOH; 4; 12	MOH; 5; 12	MOH; 6; 14	NJM; 1; 14	NJM; 2; 15	NJM; 3; 16	STP; 1; 16	STP; 2; 10	16th	112

==== Indy Pro 2000 Championship ====
Year	Team	1	2	3	4	5	6	7	8	9	10	11	12	13	14	15	16	17	18	Rank	Points
2021	Jay Howard Driver Development	ALA; 1; 14	ALA; 2; 6	STP; 1; 8	STP; 2; 15	IMS; 1; 12	IMS; 2; 13	IMS; 3; 12	LOR; 10	ROA; 1; 12	ROA; 2; 9	MOH; 1; 10	MOH; 2; 10	GMP; 10	NJM; 1; 8	NJM; 2; 6	NJM; 3; 6	MOH; 4; 9	MOH; 5; 8	10th	212
2022	Jay Howard Driver Development	STP; 1; 13	STP; 2; 5	ALA; 1; 11	ALA; 2; 13	IMS; 1; 10	IMS; 2; 7	IMS; 3; 4	IRP; 13											13th	160
2022	Exclusive Autosport									ROA; 1; 15	ROA; 2; 11	MOH; 1; 9	MOH; 2; 13	TOR; 1; 11	TOR; 2; 8	GMP	POR; 1	POR; 2	POR; 3	13th	160

* Season still in progress.

=== Complete Asian Le Mans Series results ===
(key) (Races in bold indicate pole position) (Races in italics indicate fastest lap)

Year	Team	Class	Car	Engine	1	2	3	4	Pos.	Points
2023	Inter Europol Competition	LMP3	Ligier JS P320	Nissan VK56DE 5.6L V8	DUB; 1; 9	DUB; 2; 12	ABU; 1; 9	ABU; 2; 6	13th	12

=== Complete European Le Mans Series results ===
(key) (Races in bold indicate pole position; results in italics indicate fastest lap)

Year	Entrant	Class	Chassis	Engine	1	2	3	4	5	6	Rank	Points
2023	Inter Europol Competition	LMP3	Ligier JS P320	Nissan VK56DE 5.6 L V8	CAT; 2	LEC; 6	**ARA**; Ret	SPA; 2	PRT; Ret	ALG; 4	4th	57
2024	DKR Engineering	LMP3	Duqueine M30 - D08	Nissan VK56DE 5.6L V8	CAT; 5	LEC; 2	**IMO**; 6	SPA; 7	MUG; Ret	ALG; 5	6th	53
2025	DKR Engineering	LMP3	Ginetta G61-LT-P3 Evo	Toyota V35A 3.5 L V6	CAT; Ret	LEC; 5	IMO; 8	SPA; 8	MUG; 6	ALG; 3	10th	41
2026	DKR Engineering	LMP3	Ligier JS P325	Toyota V35A 3.5 L V6	CAT; 9	LEC; 3	IMO; 5	SPA; 6	SIL; 7	ALG	10th	42

^{*} Season still in progress.

=== Complete Le Mans Cup results ===
(key) (Races in bold indicate pole position; results in italics indicate fastest lap)

Year	Entrant	Class	Chassis	1	2	3	4	5	6	7	Rank	Points
2024	WTM by Rinaldi Racing	LMP3	Ligier JS P320	CAT	LEC	LMS; 1	LMS; 2	SPA	MUG; 11	ALG; 8	25th	6
2025	DKR Engineering	LMP3	Ginetta G61-LT-P3 Evo	CAT; 16	LEC; 10	LMS; 1; 17	LMS; 2; 17	SPA; 15	SIL; 12	ALG; 6	17th	9

^{*} Season still in progress.
