= 2019 F3 Americas Championship =

Motor racing competition

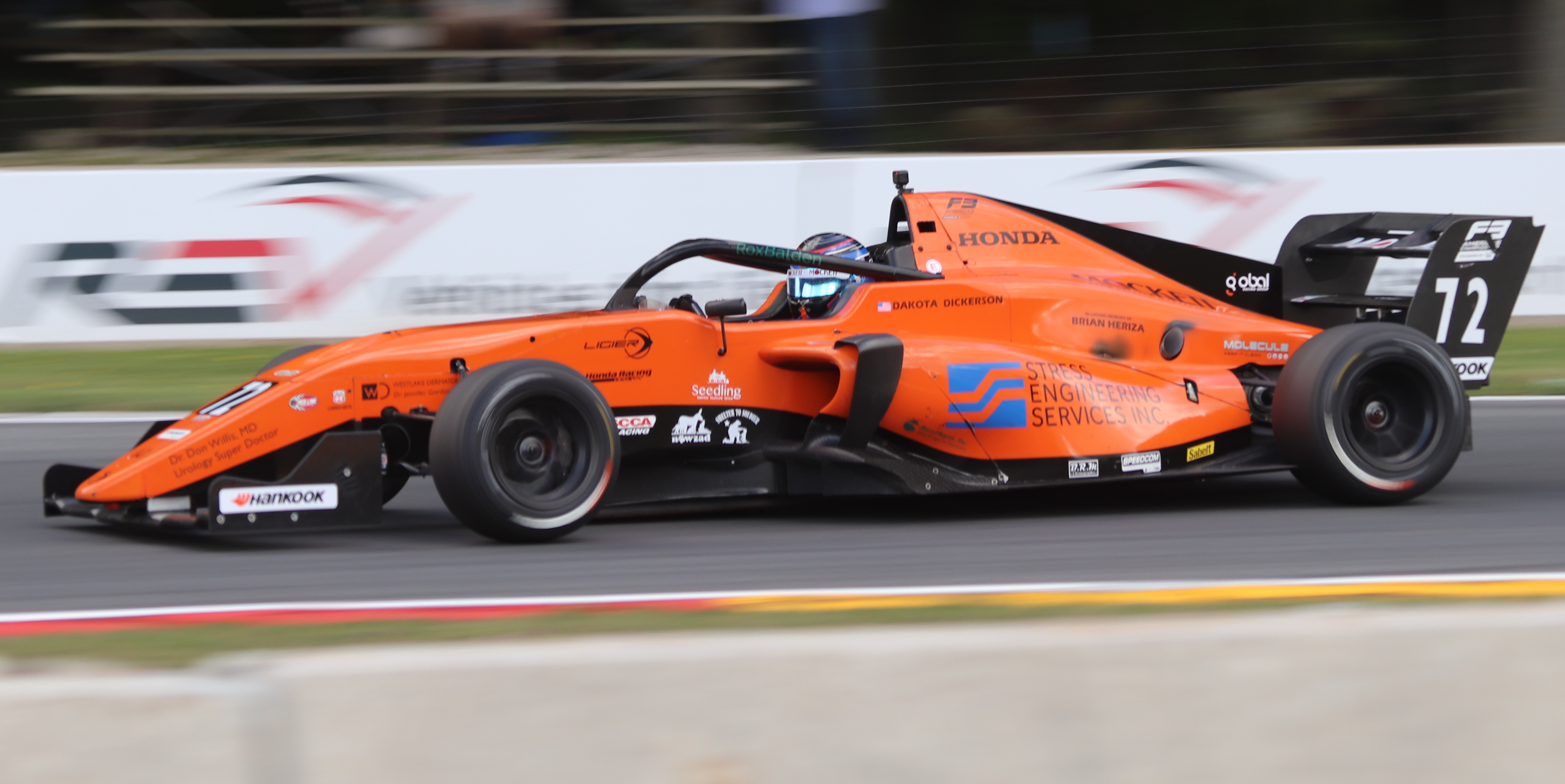
2019 Champion Dakota Dickerson racing at Road America.

The 2019 F3 Americas Championship powered by Honda was the second season for the FIA Formula 3 regional series across North America. The series is sanctioned by SCCA Pro Racing, the professional racing division of the Sports Car Club of America.

The season began on 5 April at Barber Motorsports Park as part of the Honda Indy Grand Prix of Alabama and concluded on 15 September at Sebring International Raceway after six rounds.

== Teams and drivers ==
All teams are American-registered.

Team	No.	Driver	Rounds
Velocity Racing Development	5	(United States) Parker Locke	All
Velocity Racing Development	11	(Canada) Antonio Serravalle	5
Velocity Racing Development	14	(Colombia) Mathias Soler-Obel	All
Velocity Racing Development	25	(United States) Dominic Cicero	1–4
Global Racing Group	9	(Argentina) Baltazar Leguizamón	1–3
Global Racing Group	19	(United States) Blake Upton	2–6
Global Racing Group	24	(Denmark) Benjamin Pedersen	1, 4–6
Global Racing Group	72	(United States) Dakota Dickerson	All
Global Racing Group	95	(Republic of Ireland) James Roe	All
Momentum Motorsports	16	(United States) Kent Vaccaro	All
Momentum Motorsports	34	(Canada) Megan Gilkes	3–4
Momentum Motorsports	49	(United States) Quinlan Lall	4
Momentum Motorsports	67	(United States) Shea Holbrook	1–2, 4
Momentum Motorsports	67	(United States) Quinlan Lall	3
Kiwi Motorsport	34	(United States) Austin Kaszuba	1–2
DEForce Racing	34	(United Kingdom) James Raven	6
Abel Motorsports	49	(Netherlands) Danny van Dongen	6
Abel Motorsports	51	(United States) Jacob Abel	1–3, 6
Southern Motorsports	61	(United States) John Paul Southern, Jr.	All
Jensen Global Advisors	99	(Canada) Logan Cusson	All

== Race calendar ==
All races were held on permanent road courses in the United States. The series schedule was announced on 7 December 2018. On 21 February 2019 the series announced the addition of Road America to the schedule. Four rounds were joint F3 Americas and United States F4 championship rounds, with events at one NTT IndyCar Series and one NASCAR Xfinity Series round each.

Round		Circuit	Date	Pole position	Fastest lap	Winning driver	Winning team	Supporting
1	R1	Barber Motorsports Park, Birmingham	6 April	(Denmark) Benjamin Pedersen	(United States) Dakota Dickerson	(Denmark) Benjamin Pedersen	Global Racing Group	IndyCar Series
1	R2	Barber Motorsports Park, Birmingham	7 April		(Canada) Logan Cusson	(United States) Dakota Dickerson	Global Racing Group	IndyCar Series
2	R3	Road Atlanta, Braselton	19 April	(United States) Dakota Dickerson (Note: Heavy rains cancelled the qualifying session. Starting grid set based on current point standings.)	(United States) Dakota Dickerson	(United States) Jacob Abel	Abel Motorsports	Formula 4 United States Championship; Formula Race Promotions
2	R4	Road Atlanta, Braselton	20 April		(United States) Kent Vaccaro	(United States) Jacob Abel	Abel Motorsports	Formula 4 United States Championship; Formula Race Promotions
2	R5	Road Atlanta, Braselton	20 April		(United States) Dakota Dickerson	(United States) Dakota Dickerson	Global Racing Group	Formula 4 United States Championship; Formula Race Promotions
3	R6	Pittsburgh International Race Complex, Wampum	22 June	(United States) Dakota Dickerson	(United States) Dakota Dickerson	(United States) Dakota Dickerson	Global Racing Group	Formula 4 United States Championship
3	R7	Pittsburgh International Race Complex, Wampum	23 June		(United States) Dakota Dickerson	(United States) Dakota Dickerson	Global Racing Group	Formula 4 United States Championship
3	R8	Pittsburgh International Race Complex, Wampum	23 June		(United States) Dakota Dickerson	(United States) Dakota Dickerson	Global Racing Group	Formula 4 United States Championship
4	R9	Virginia International Raceway, Alton	27 July	(Denmark) Benjamin Pedersen	(Colombia) Mathias Soler-Obel	(Denmark) Benjamin Pedersen	Global Racing Group	Formula 4 United States Championship; Formula Race Promotions
4	R10	Virginia International Raceway, Alton	28 July		(Colombia) Mathias Soler-Obel	(Denmark) Benjamin Pedersen	Global Racing Group	Formula 4 United States Championship; Formula Race Promotions
4	R11	Virginia International Raceway, Alton	28 July		(United States) Dakota Dickerson	(Colombia) Mathias Soler-Obel	Velocity Racing Development	Formula 4 United States Championship; Formula Race Promotions
5	R12	Road America, Elkhart Lake	23 August	(Colombia) Mathias Soler-Obel	(Denmark) Benjamin Pedersen	(Republic of Ireland) James Roe	Global Racing Group	NASCAR Xfinity Series; Trans-Am Series; Stadium Super Trucks
5	R13	Road America, Elkhart Lake	24 August		(Denmark) Benjamin Pedersen	(Denmark) Benjamin Pedersen	Global Racing Group	NASCAR Xfinity Series; Trans-Am Series; Stadium Super Trucks
6	R14	Sebring International Raceway, Sebring	14 September	(Denmark) Benjamin Pedersen	(United States) Jacob Abel	(Denmark) Benjamin Pedersen	Global Racing Group	Formula 4 United States Championship
6	R15	Sebring International Raceway, Sebring	14 September		(United States) Jacob Abel	(Denmark) Benjamin Pedersen	Global Racing Group	Formula 4 United States Championship
6	R16	Sebring International Raceway, Sebring	15 September		(United States) Jacob Abel	(Denmark) Benjamin Pedersen	Global Racing Group	Formula 4 United States Championship

== Championship standings ==
- Points are awarded as follows:

Position	**1st**	**2nd**	**3rd**	**4th**	**5th**	**6th**	**7th**	**8th**	**9th**	**10th**
Points	25	18	15	12	10	8	6	4	2	1

=== Drivers' standings ===
Pos	Driver	BAR		ATL			PIT			VIR			ROA		SEB			Pts
Pos	Driver	R1	R2	R1	R2	R3	R1	R2	R3	R1	R2	R3	R1	R2	R1	R2	R3	Pts
1	(United States) Dakota Dickerson	2	1	**3**	6	1	**1**	1	1	3	4	4	Ret	2	5	2	2	269
2	(Denmark) Benjamin Pedersen	**1**	2							**1**	1	2	5	1	**1**	1	1	221
3	(Colombia) Mathias Soler-Obel	Ret	5	Ret	Ret	13†	6	6	4	2	2	1	**2**	3	3	4	9†	161
4	(United States) Jacob Abel	3	4	1	1	3	3	3	11						2	Ret	3	155
5	(Republic of Ireland) James Roe	4	7	4	Ret	6	5	7	6	8	5	5	1	6	6	5	5	147
6	(United States) John Paul Southern, Jr.	8	Ret	Ret	4	4	4	5	5	Ret	6	Ret	3	4	4	3	4	134
7	(Argentina) Baltazar Leguizamón	5	Ret	2	Ret	2	2	2	2									100
8	(United States) Blake Upton			9	5	7	8	10	8	6	8	7	4	5	8	6	7	85
9	(United States) Quinlan Lall						11	4	3	4	3	3						69
10	(United States) Parker Locke	10	9	7	2	8	7	8	7	9	Ret	NC	Ret	Ret	Ret	8	6	61
11	(United States) Kent Vaccaro	9	3	11	8	11	Ret	9	9	10†	9	6	Ret	DNS	7	Ret	DNS	42
12	(Canada) Logan Cusson	6	11	10	7	9	10	12	12	7	7	NC	Ret	DNS	Ret	7	8	40
13	(United States) Shea Holbrook	Ret	6	8	3	10				Ret	DNS	DNS						28
14	(United States) Dominic Cicero	7	10	5	Ret	12	12	11	10	5	Ret	Ret						28
15	(United States) Austin Kaszuba	Ret	8	6	DSQ	5												22
16	(Canada) Antonio Serravalle												6	NC				8
17	(Canada) Megan Gilkes						9	13	13	Ret	DNS	DNS						2
—	(United Kingdom) James Raven														Ret	Ret	DNS	0
—	(Netherlands) Danny van Dongen														Ret	DNS	DNS	0
Pos	Driver	R1	R2	R1	R2	R3	R1	R2	R3	R1	R2	R3	R1	R2	R1	R2	R3	Pts
Pos	Driver	BAR		ATL			PIT			VIR			ROA		SEB			Pts

Colour	Result
Gold	Winner
Silver	Second place
Bronze	Third place
Green	Points classification
Blue	Non-points classification
Blue	Non-classified finish (NC)
Purple	Retired, not classified (Ret)
Red	Did not qualify (DNQ)
Red	Did not pre-qualify (DNPQ)
Black	Disqualified (DSQ)
White	Did not start (DNS)
White	Withdrew (WD)
White	Race cancelled (C)
Blank	Did not practice (DNP)
Blank	Did not arrive (DNA)
Blank	Excluded (EX)

**Bold** – Pole
Italics – Fastest Lap
† — Did not finish, but classified

=== Teams Championship ===
Pos	Team	Pts
1	Global Racing Group	617
2	Velocity Racing Development	254
3	Abel Motorsports	155
4	Momentum Motorsports	141
5	Southern Motorsports	134
6	Jensen Global Advisors	40
7	Kiwi Motorsport	22
8	DEForce Racing	0
