= James Roe (racing driver) =

Irish racing driver (born 1998)

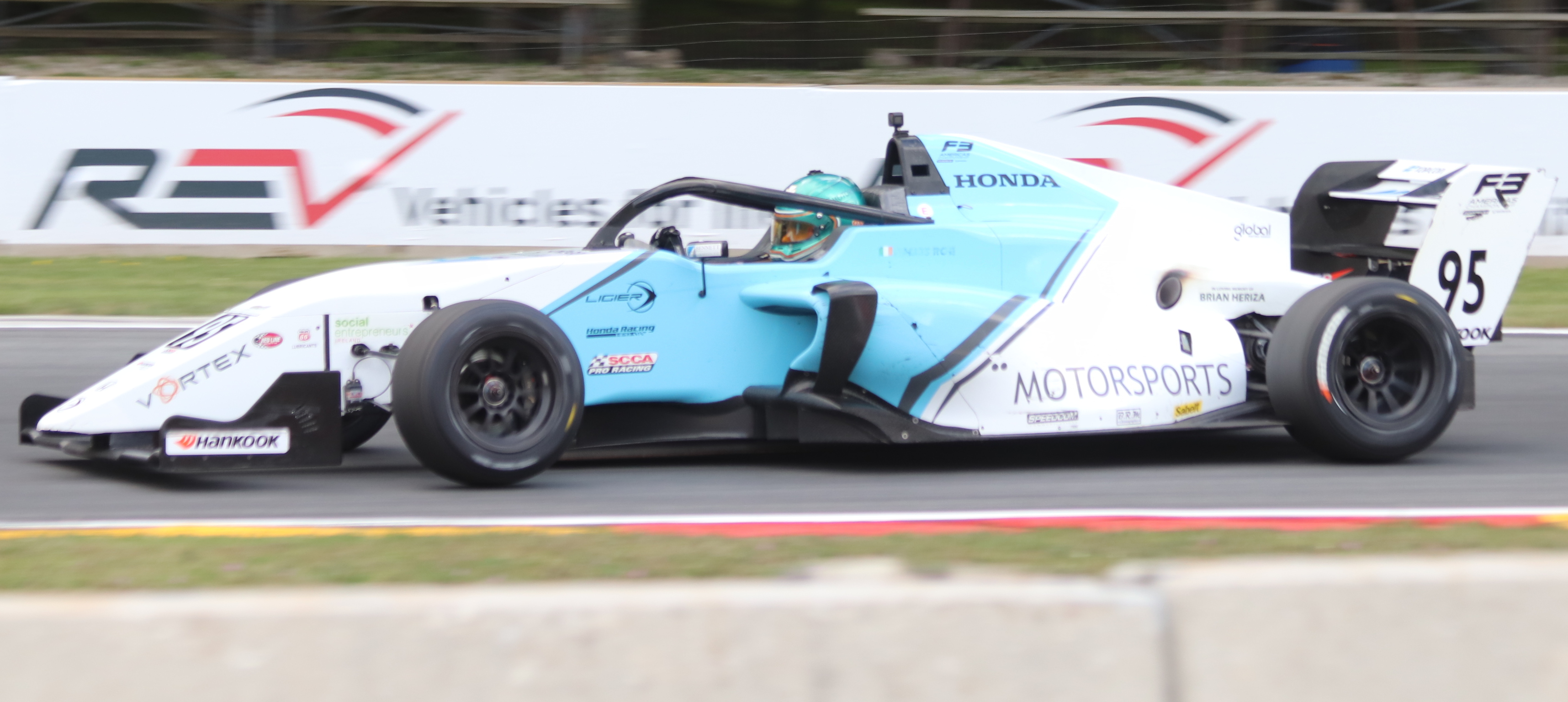
- Roe at Road America
- Nationality: (Republic of Ireland) Irish
- Born: James Roe Jr. 11 October 1998 (age 28) Naas, County Kildare, Ireland
- Relatives: Michael Roe (uncle)

Indy NXT career
- Debut season: 2022
- Current team: Chip Ganassi Racing
- Car number: 8
- Starts: 55
- Championships: 0
- Wins: 0
- Podiums: 3
- Poles: 1
- Fastest laps: 0
- Best finish: 6th in 2024

IMSA SportsCar Championship career
- Debut season: 2025
- Current team: Pratt Miller Motorsports
- Categorisation: FIA Silver
- Car number: 73
- Starts: 1
- Championships: 0
- Wins: 0
- Podiums: 0
- Poles: 0
- Fastest laps: 0
- Best finish: TBD in 2025 (LMP2)

Previous series
- 2021 2020 2019 2018 2018 2016-17: Indy Pro 2000 Championship; FR Americas Championship; F3 Americas Championship; U.S. F2000 National Championship; F2000 Championship Series; F4 UAE Championship

James Roe Jr. (born 11 October 1998) is an Irish racing driver. He competes in Indy NXT for Chip Ganassi Racing. He previously drove for TJ Speed Motorsports in 2022. Roe previously competed in the Indy Pro 2000 Championship with Turn 3 Motorsport. Roe is a nephew of former racing driver Michael Roe.

== Racing career ==
=== Early career ===
Roe started racing at the age of fifteen, later than most of his peers. He and his family saved up funds and purchased his first race car, a Ginetta G20, allowing him to take part in the 2014 Ginetta Junior Ireland series.

Roe competed again in the 2015 Ginetta Junior Ireland series. He was on the podium ten times and won five races, finishing second overall.

In 2018, Roe moved from Ireland to the United States to further pursue a career in motorsport, and has been living there ever since.

=== Indy Pro 2000 ===
On February 22, 2021, it was announced that Roe would be joining Turn 3 Motorsport to compete in the 2021 Indy Pro 2000 Championship. Roe managed to get his first win of the season at the final race in Mid-Ohio, finishing ahead of Enaam Ahmed and 2021 series champion, Christian Rasmussen.

=== Indy NXT ===
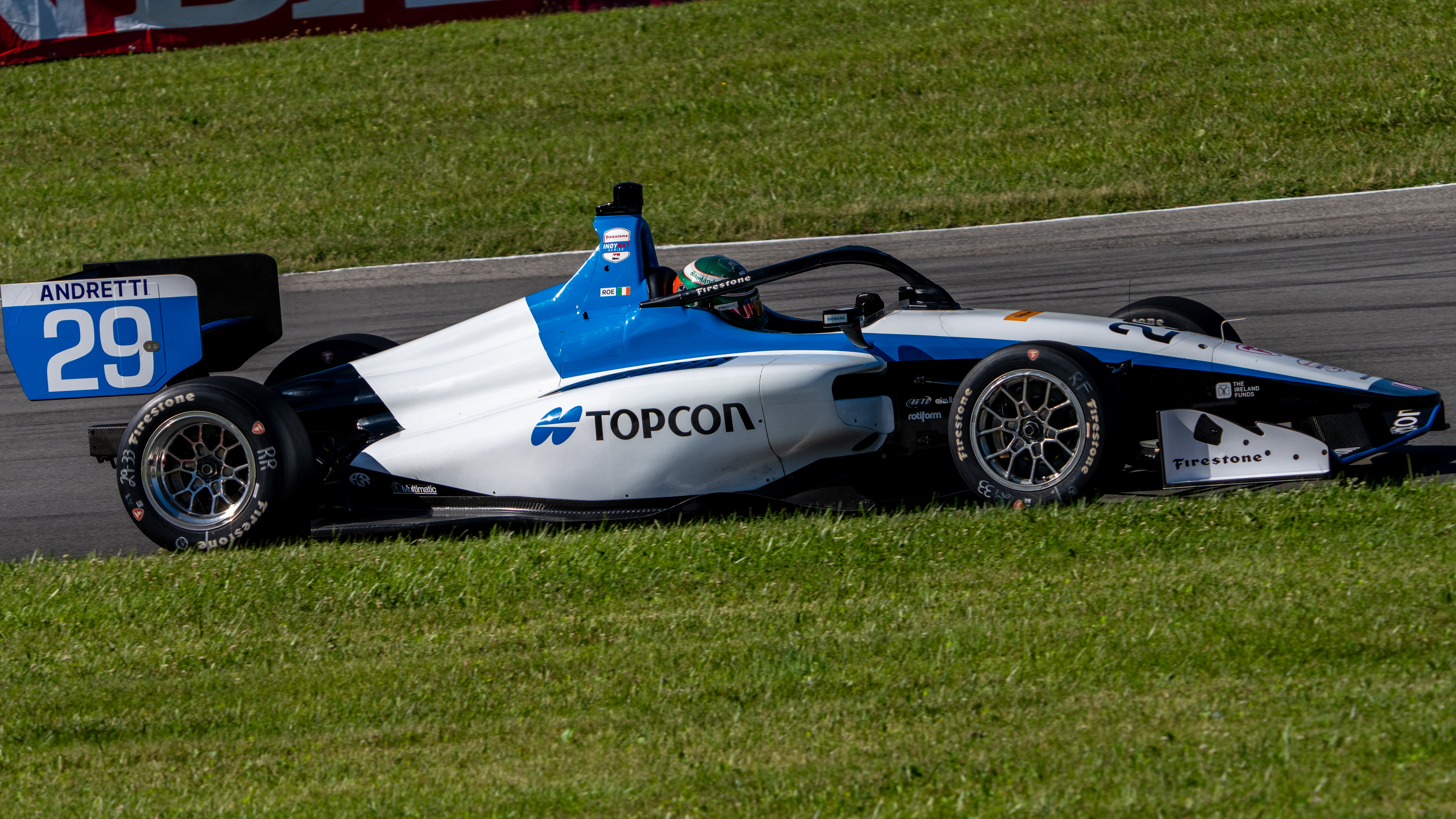
Roe Jr. at Mid-Ohio in 2024

For the 2022 season, Roe moved to TJ Speed Motorsports to compete in the Indy Lights series. He scored three top ten finishes in his nine races with the team before contesting two rounds with HMD. As Roe missed the final three races, he ended up twelfth in the standings.

On January 4, 2023, it was announced that Roe would compete full-time in the 2023 Indy NXT season for Andretti Autosport after impressing the team during a test session at Barber Motorsports Park. Having fought for the win at the Indianapolis Road Course, Roe scored his first podium in the series, finishing second. He ended the season seventh in the championship, finishing ahead of Jamie Chadwick but behind Hunter McElrea and Louis Foster in the teammate battle.

In 2024, Roe remained in Indy NXT and once again partnered Chadwick and Foster at Andretti. During a patchy first half of the season, which included three retirements, Roe managed to score a sole podium at Barber, finishing third. At the first oval race in Iowa, Roe took the first pole position of his NXT career, setting the series' lap record at the track in the process. Having led the vast majority of the race, Roe was passed by teammate Foster late on and finished second.

Roe continued driving for Andretti Autosport for the 2025 Indy NXT season. He finished 12th in the standings and failed to score a better finish than seventh in Iowa.

Roe switched to Chip Ganassi Racing for the 2026 season.

=== Endurance racing ===
During 2025, Roe also raced in the four Michelin Endurance Cup rounds of the IMSA SportsCar Championship for Pratt Miller Motorsports. Partnering Pietro Fittipaldi and gentleman driver Chris Cumming, he claimed a season-best result of seventh at Petit Le Mans. At the end of the year, Roe joined TF Sport to race a Chevrolet Corvette Z06 GT3.R in the 2025–26 Asian Le Mans Series alongside Matt Bell and Blake McDonald.

== Racing record ==
=== Career summary ===
Season	Series	Team	Races	Wins	Poles	F/Laps	Podiums	Points	Position
2016–17	Formula 4 UAE Championship	Rasgaira Motorsports	4	0	0	0	1	49	11th
2018	F2000 Championship Series	ArmsUp Motorsports	14	3	0	3	7	414	2nd
2018	U.S. F2000 National Championship	Swan-RJB Motorsports	2	0	0	0	0	26	30th
2019	F3 Americas Championship	Global Racing Group	16	1	0	0	1	147	5th
2020	Formula Regional Americas Championship	Global Racing Group	17	0	0	0	0	92	7th
2021	Indy Pro 2000 Championship	Turn 3 Motorsport	18	1	1	0	1	243	7th
2022	Indy Lights	TJ Speed Motorsports	9	0	0	0	0	219	12th
2022	Indy Lights	HMD Motorsports with Dale Coyne Racing	2	0	0	0	0	219	12th
2022	Italian GT Championship - GT3 Pro-Am	Imperiale Racing	3	1	0	0	2	0	NC†
2022	International GT Open	Imperiale Racing	2	0	0	0	0	4	23rd
2023	Indy NXT	Andretti Autosport	14	0	0	0	1	335	7th
2024	Indy NXT	Andretti Global	14	0	1	0	2	316	6th
2025	Indy NXT	Andretti Global	14	0	0	0	0	235	12th
2025	IMSA SportsCar Championship - LMP2	Pratt Miller Motorsports	4	0	0	0	0	970	30th
2025-26	Asian Le Mans Series - GT	TF Sport	6	0	0	0	0	4	24th
2026	Indy NXT	Chip Ganassi Racing	17	0	0	0	0	214	20th
2026	IMSA SportsCar Championship - GTD	Lone Star Racing	5	0	0	0	0	1372	21st

^{†} As Roe Jr. was a guest driver, he was ineligible for points. *Season still in progress.

== Motorsports career results ==
=== Complete Formula 4 UAE Championship results ===
(key) (Races in bold indicate pole position) (Races in italics indicate fastest lap)

Year	Team	1	2	3	4	5	6	7	8	9	10	11	12	13	14	15	16	17	18	Rank	Points
2016-17	Rasgaira Motorsports	DUB; 1; 4	DUB; 2; 4	DUB; 3; 3	ABU; 1; 5	ABU; 2 DNS	ABU; 3 DNS	ABU; 4 DNS	DUB; 1	DUB; 2	DUB; 3	ABU; 1	ABU; 2	ABU; 3	ABU; 4	ABU; 1	ABU; 2	ABU; 3	ABU; 4	11th	49

=== American open-wheel results ===
==== F2000 Championship Series ====
(key) (Races in bold indicate pole position) (Races in italics indicate fastest lap)

Year	Team	1	2	3	4	5	6	7	8	9	10	11	12	13	14	Rank	Points
2018	ArmsUp Motorsports	ATL; 6	ATL; 3	WGL; 8	WGL; 1	VIR; 15	VIR; 1	MOH; 8	MOH; 3	PIT; Ret	PIT; 5	SPM; 3	SPM; Ret	NJM; 1	NJM; 3	2nd	414

==== U.S. F2000 National Championship Series ====
(key) (Races in bold indicate pole position) (Races in italics indicate fastest lap)

Year	Team	1	2	3	4	5	6	7	8	9	10	11	12	13	14	Rank	Points
2018	Swan-RJB Motorsports	STP; 1	STP; 2	IMS; 1; 12	IMS; 2; 5	LOS	ROA; 1	ROA; 2	TOR; 1	TOR; 2	MOH; 1	MOH; 2	MOH; 3	POR; 1	POR; 2	30th	26

==== F3 / Formula Regional Americas Championship ====
(key) (Races in bold indicate pole position) (Races in italics indicate fastest lap)

Year	Team	1	2	3	4	5	6	7	8	9	10	11	12	13	14	15	16	17	Rank	Points
2019	Global Racing Group	BAR; 1; 4	BAR; 2; 7	ATL; 1; 4	ATL; 2 Ret	ATL; 3; 6	PIT; 1; 5	PIT; 2; 7	PIT; 3; 6	VIR; 1; 8	VIR; 2; 5	VIR; 3; 5	ROA; 1; 1	ROA; 2; 6	SEB; 1; 6	SEB; 2; 5	SEB; 3; 5		5th	147
2020	Global Racing Group	MOH; 1; 5	MOH; 2; 12	VIR; 1 Ret	VIR; 2; 8	VIR; 3; 9	BAR; 1; 8	BAR; 2; 9	BAR; 3; 8	SEB; 1; 9	SEB; 2; 7	SEB; 3; 4	HMS; 1; 5	HMS; 2; 6	HMS; 3; 9	COA; 1; 7	COA; 2; 5	COA; 3; 6	7th	92

==== Indy Pro 2000 Championship ====
(key) (Races in bold indicate pole position) (Races in italics indicate fastest lap) (Races with * indicate most race laps led)

Year	Team	1	2	3	4	5	6	7	8	9	10	11	12	13	14	15	16	17	18	Rank	Points
2021	Turn 3 Motorsport	ALA; 1; 15	ALA; 2; 11	STP; 1; 13	STP; 2; 16	IMS; 1; 8	IMS; 2; 10	IMS; 3; 11	LOR; 11	ROA; 1; 6	ROA; 2; 10	MOH; 1; 8	MOH; 2; 11	**GMP**; 4	NJM; 1; 6	NJM; 2; 10	NJM; 3; 5	MOH; 1; 11	MOH; 2; 1*	7th	243

==== Indy Lights / NXT ====
(key) (Races in bold indicate pole position) (Races in italics indicate fastest lap) (Races with * indicate most race laps led)

Year	Team	1	2	3	4	5	6	7	8	9	10	11	12	13	14	15	16	17	Rank	Points
2022	TJ Speed Motorsports	STP; 13	BAR; 13	IMS; 13	IMS; 13	DET; 7	DET; 9	RDA; 7	MOH; 12	IOW; 13									12th	219
2022	HMD Motorsports with Dale Coyne Racing										NSH; 12	GMP; 8	POR	LAG	LAG				12th	219
2023	Andretti Autosport	STP; 17	BAR; 5	IMS; 7	DET; 10	DET; 6	RDA; 5	MOH; 12	IOW; 9	NSH; 4	IMS; 2	STL; 15	POR; 8	LAG; 9	LAG; 15				7th	335
2024	Andretti Global	STP; 16	BAR; 3	IMS; 15	IMS; 4	DET; 16	RDA; 18	LAG; 5	LAG; 19	MOH; 15	**IOW**; 2*	GMP; 10	POR; 16	MIL; 6	NSH; 4				6th	316
2025	Andretti Global	STP; 20	BAR; 10	IMS; 19	IMS; 11	DET; 13	GMP; 18	RDA; 14	MOH; 13	IOW; 7	LAG; 14	LAG; 13	POR; 18	MIL; 9	NSH; 10				12th	235
2026	Chip Ganassi Racing	STP; 21	ARL; 17	BAR; 23	BAR; 12	IMS; 10	IMS; 22	DET; 18	GAT; 18	ROA; 15	ROA; 19	MOH; 20	MOH; 19	NSS; 16	POR; 14	MIL; 15	LAG; 21	LAG; 16	20th	214

* Season still in progress.

=== Complete IMSA SportsCar Championship results ===
(key) (Races in bold indicate pole position; results in italics indicate fastest lap)

Year	Team	Class	Make	Engine	1	2	3	4	5	6	7	8	9	10	Pos.	Points
2025	Pratt Miller Motorsports	LMP2	Oreca 07	Gibson GK428 4.2 L V8	DAY; 9	SEB; 11	WGL	MOS	ELK	IMS; 9	PET; 7				30th	970
2026	Lone Star Racing	GTD	Mercedes-AMG GT3 Evo	Mercedes-AMG M159 6.2 L V8	DAY; 6	SEB; 4	LBH	LGA	WGL; 10	MOS	ELK; 6	VIR	IMS	PET; 4	21st	1372
