= Dakota Dickerson =

American racing driver

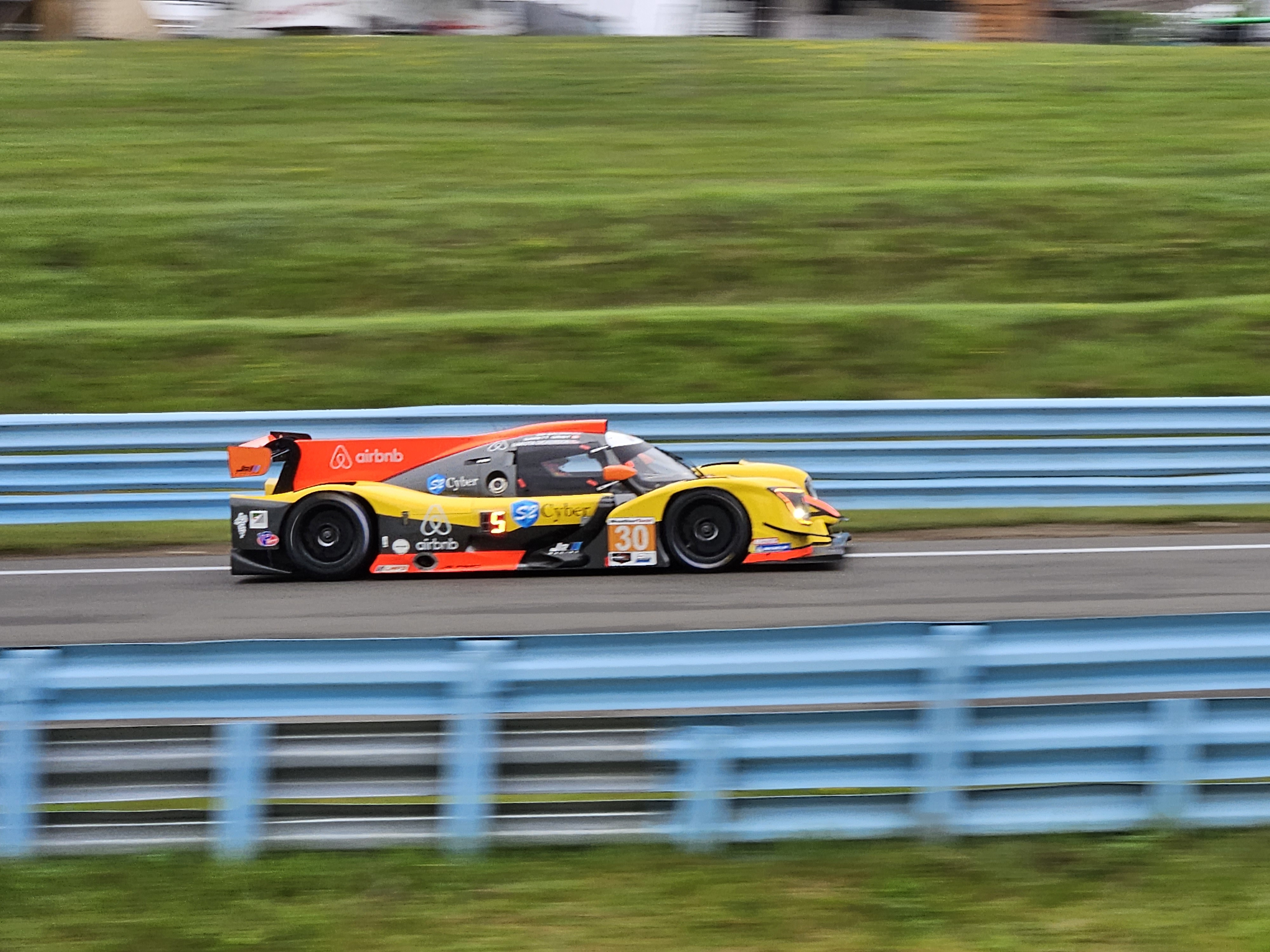
- Dickerson competing in LMP3 in 2023
- Nationality: (United States) American
- Born: December 2, 1996 (age 29) San Diego, California, U.S.
- Categorisation: FIA Silver

Dakota Dickerson (born December 2, 1996) is an American racing driver. He won the 2018 Formula 4 United States Championship and 2019 F3 Americas Championship.

== Racing record ==
=== Career summary ===
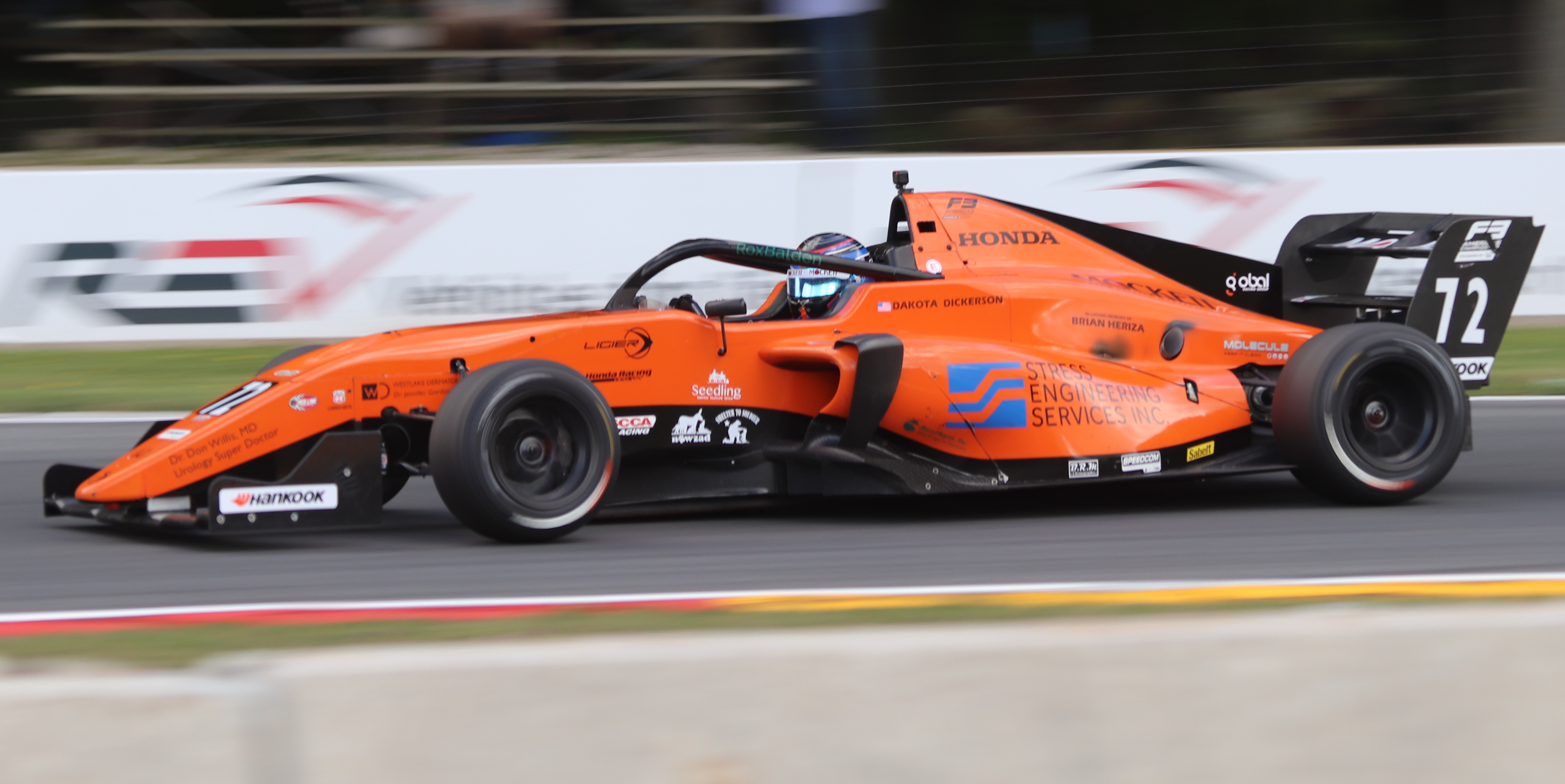
Dickerson's 2019 F3 Americas Championship car at Road America

Season	Series	Team	Races	Wins	Poles	F/Laps	Podiums	Points	Position
2016	U.S. F2000 National Championship	Afterburner Autosport	16	0	0	0	0	176	9th
2017	U.S. F2000 National Championship	Newman Wachs Racing	6	0	0	0	0	86	14th
2017	Formula 4 United States Championship	Kiwi Motorsport LTD	11	0	1	1	5	152	**3rd**
2018	Formula 4 United States Championship	DC Autosport w/ Cape Motorsports	17	4	2	3	11	269	**1st**
2018	U.S. F2000 National Championship	ArmsUp Motorsports	9	0	1	0	1	120	13th
2019	F3 Americas Championship	Global Racing Group	16	5	2	7	11	269	**1st**
2019	U.S. F2000 National Championship	Legacy Autosport	2	0	0	0	0	12	25th
2019	IMSA Prototype Challenge	ANSA Motorsports	1	0	0	0	0	89	16th
2019	IMSA Prototype Challenge	MLT Motorsports	3	1	0	0	1	89	16th
2020	IMSA Prototype Challenge	MLT Motorsports	6	1	0	0	2	174	**2nd**
2020	Michelin Pilot Challenge - TCR	LA Honda World Racing	1	0	0	0	0	19	NC
2021	IMSA Prototype Challenge - LMP3-1	MLT Motorsports	6	1	0	0	5	1850	**1st**
2021	GT World Challenge America - Pro Am	Racers Edge Motorsport	7	2	1	0	6	138	4th
2022	IMSA Prototype Challenge	MLT Motorsports	1	0	0	0	0	480	21st
2022	IMSA Prototype Challenge	JDC MotorSports	1	0	0	0	0	480	21st
2022	IMSA SportsCar Championship - LMP3	Jr III Motorsports	1	0	0	0	1	1195	10th
2022	IMSA SportsCar Championship - LMP3	MLT Motorsports	3	0	0	0	0	1195	10th
2023	IMSA SportsCar Championship - LMP3	Andretti Autosport	1	0	0	0	0	1213	8th
2023	IMSA SportsCar Championship - LMP3	Jr III Motorsports	3	1	0	2	2	1213	8th
2023	IMSA SportsCar Championship - LMP3	MLT Motorsports	1	0	0	0	0	1213	8th
2023	GT4 European Series - Pro-Am	W&S Motorsport	4	0	0	0	0	8	23rd

^{*} Season still in progress.

=== American open–wheel racing results ===
==== U.S. F2000 National Championship ====
Year	Team	1	2	3	4	5	6	7	8	9	10	11	12	13	14	15	16	Rank	Points
2016	Afterburner Autosport	STP; 8	STP; 22	BAR; 17	BAR; 13	IMS; 11	IMS; 20	LOR; 9	ROA; 12	ROA; 10	TOR; 7	TOR; 4	MOH; 5	MOH; 5	MOH; 6	LAG; 10	LAG; 10	**9th**	**176**
2017	Newman Wachs Racing	STP; 6	STP; 6	BAR; 6	BAR; 10	IMS; 4	IMS; 10	ROA	ROA	IOW	TOR	TOR	MOH	MOH	WGL			14th	86
2018	ArmsUp Motorsports	STP	STP	IMS	IMS	LOR	ROA; 14	ROA; 9	TOR; 2	TOR; 6	MOH; 6	MOH; 6	MOH; 18	POR; 8	POR; 7			13th	120
2019	Legacy Autosport	STP	STP	IMS; 21	IMS; 7	LOR	ROA	ROA	TOR	TOR	MOH	MOH	POR	POR	LAG	LAG		25th	15

=== Complete Formula 4 United States Championship results ===
(key) (Races in bold indicate pole position) (Races in italics indicate fastest lap)

Year	Entrant	1	2	3	4	5	6	7	8	9	10	11	12	13	14	15	16	17	18	19	20	DC	Points
2017	Kiwi Motorsport Ltd	HMS; 1	HMS; 2	HMS; 2	IMS; 1	IMS; 2	IMS; 2	**MSP**; **1**; 4	MSP; 2; 2	MSP; 3; 2	MOH; 1	MOH; 2	MOH; 3	VIR; 1; 3	VIR; 2; 4	VIR; 3; 4	COTA1; 1; 4	COTA1; 2; 6	COTA1; 3; 4	COTA2; 1; 3	COTA2; 2; 2	3rd	152

=== Complete WeatherTech SportsCar Championship results ===
(key) (Races in bold indicate pole position; results in italics indicate fastest lap)

Year	Team	Class	Make	Engine	1	2	3	4	5	6	7	Pos.	Points
2022	Jr III Motorsports	LMP3	Ligier JS P320	Nissan VK56DE 5.6 L V8	DAY	SEB; 2	LGA			ELK; 5	PET	10th	1195
2022	MLT Motorsports	LMP3	Ligier JS P320	Nissan VK56DE 5.6 L V8				MOH; 5	WGL; 7			10th	1195
2023	Andretti Autosport	LMP3	Ligier JS P320	Nissan VK56DE 5.6 L V8	DAY; 7	SEB; 8	WGL; 2	MOS	ELK	IMS	PET	14th*	578*

Sporting positions
Preceded by Kyle Kirkwood	Formula 4 United States Championship; Champion; 2018	Succeeded by Joshua Car
