= Joshua Car =

Australian race car driver

- Nationality: (Australia) Australian
- Born: 1 August 2000 (age 26) Sydney, Australia

Formula 4 United States Championship career
- Debut season: 2018
- Current team: Crosslink/Kiwi Motorsport
- Car number: 9
- Starts: 34
- Wins: 8
- Podiums: 18
- Poles: 2
- Best finish: 1st in 2019

Joshua Car (born 1 August 2000) is an Australian race car driver with residence in Dallas, Texas, United States.

== Career ==
Car began his racing career in karting in 2013. In 2018, he made his debut in the Formula 4 United States Championship with Crosslink Racing w/ Kiwi Motorsport. He returned to the series in 2019, and won the championship.

== Racing record ==
=== Career summary ===
| Season | Series | Team | Races | Wins | Poles | F/laps | Podiums | Points | Position |
|---|---|---|---|---|---|---|---|---|---|
| 2018 | Formula 4 United States Championship | Crosslink Racing with Kiwi Motorsport | 17 | 2 | 0 | 1 | 4 | 168 | 4th |
| 2019 | Formula 4 United States Championship | Crosslink/Kiwi Motorsport | 15 | 6 | 1 | 5 | 14 | 299 | **1st** |
| 2020 | Formula Regional Americas Championship | Crosslink Racing/Kiwi Motorsport | 17 | 0 | 0 | 1 | 3 | 109 | 6th |
| 2021 | Formula Regional Americas Championship | Team Crosslink | 17 | 3 | 3 | 5 | 9 | 218 | **2nd** |

^{*} Season still in progress.

=== Complete Formula 4 United States Championship results ===
(key) (Races in bold indicate pole position) (Races in italics indicate fastest lap)

| Year | Entrant | 1 | 2 | 3 | 4 | 5 | 6 | 7 | 8 | 9 | 10 | 11 | 12 | 13 | 14 | 15 | 16 | 17 | DC | Points |
|---|---|---|---|---|---|---|---|---|---|---|---|---|---|---|---|---|---|---|---|---|
| 2018 | Crosslink Racing with Kiwi Motorsport | VIR; 1; 4 | VIR; 2; 6 | VIR; 3; 4 | ROA; 1 Ret | ROA; 2; 21 | ROA; 3; 7 | MOH; 1; 7 | MOH; 2; 10 | MOH; 3; 6 | PIT; 1; 4 | PIT; 2; 1 | PIT; 3; 1 | NJMP; 1; 6 | NJMP; 2; 7 | NJMP; 3; 3 | COTA; 1; 7 | COTA; 2; 2 | 4th | 168 |
| 2019 | Crosslink/Kiwi Motorsport | **ATL**; 3 | ATL; 3 | ATL; 1 | PIT; 2 | PIT; 3 | PIT; 1 | VIR; 1 | VIR; 2 | VIR; 2 | MOH; 2 | MOH; 1 | MOH; 1 | SEB; 2 | SEB; 4 | SEB; 1 | COA; 29† | COA; 9 | 1st | 299 |

Sporting positions
| Preceded by Dakota Dickerson | Formula 4 United States Championship; Champion; 2019 | Succeeded by Hunter Yeany |
