= Simraceway =

2011 video game

- Developer: Ignite Game Technologies
- Platform: Microsoft Windows
- Genre: Racing
- Modes: Single-player, multiplayer

Simraceway was an online racing simulation that hosted live, multiplayer racing events. The race environment was developed by Ignite Game Technologies, Inc. The service used a client-server software model similar to popular online games such as World of Warcraft allowing the racing environment to be continually updated.

Simraceway allowed racers to compete online for free or prize-based competitions monitored by professional race marshals who encouraged fair, competitive racing. The service was free to join and went into full release in November 2011. The servers were shut down on August 14, 2016.

== Gameplay ==
Simraceway offered multiplayer auto racing over the internet and used laser scanned tracks for millimeter accuracy of the racing surface to provide a realistic experience. The environment also used unique skill quantification technology to enable highly accurate player skill matching. The platform was designed for both amateur and professional racing drivers.

=== Professional consultants ===
Two individuals with experience in autosport racing were consultants in developing the game in 2011. In August, two-time Indy 500 winner Dan Wheldon signed on to the Simraceway team to help design the gameplay experience and develop the physics engine. In October, Dario Franchitti signed on to the Simraceway team to help with the design of the tracks, cars and overall gameplay experience.

== Tracks ==
In addition to original blueprints of many tracks, developers used laser scanning technology to achieve millimeter-accurate precision track recreations. Simraceway featured 30 laser scanned and fictional circuits, such as Mid-Ohio, Daytona International Speedway, Brno and more.

== Licensing ==
Ignite Game Technologies signed deals to include modern and historic licensed content from a variety of car and racing brands including Bentley, Bugatti, Ford, Mitsubishi, Saleen and Volkswagen. Models included F1, Indycar & GT race cars as well as various street cars. In November 2011 Simraceway licensed the entire catalogue (60) of McLaren group vehicles (both F1 and automotive divisions). For realism, vehicles were laser scanned and custom sound recorded.

== Peripherals ==
In November 2011 SteelSeries and Simraceway formed a partnership to release the "SteelSeries Simraceway SRW-S1" steering wheel, an officially branded, motion sensing steering wheel.

== Racing facility ==
Simraceway racing facility

In August 2011, Simraceway teamed up with Jim Russell driving school and opened a 30,000 square-foot performance driving facility at Infineon Raceway in Sonoma, Calif. It offers 70 vehicles ranging from Karts to the Mitsubishi Lancer Evolution to a fleet of custom-built Lola-engineered Formula Three racing cars and is the largest single user of Infineon Raceway.
