= 2018 Formula 4 United States Championship =

Motor racing competition

The 2018 Formula 4 United States Championship season was the third season of the United States Formula 4 Championship, a motor racing series regulated according to FIA Formula 4 regulations and sanctioned by SCCA Pro Racing, the professional racing division of the Sports Car Club of America.

== Teams and drivers ==
All teams were American-registered.

Team	No.	Driver	Rounds
Momentum Motorsports; Skip Barber Momentum F4	2	(United States) William Lambros	5
Momentum Motorsports; Skip Barber Momentum F4	16	(United States) Kent Vaccaro	All
Jay Howard's Motorsports Driver Development	3	(United States) Aidan Yoder	1–2
Jay Howard's Motorsports Driver Development	3	(United States) Daniel Berry	5–6
Jay Howard's Motorsports Driver Development	4	(United Kingdom) Teddy Wilson	All
Jay Howard's Motorsports Driver Development	5	(United States) Wyatt Brichacek	All
Jay Howard's Motorsports Driver Development	6	(Denmark) Christian Rasmussen	All
Jay Howard's Motorsports Driver Development	7	(United States) Braden Eves	1–3
Jay Howard's Motorsports Driver Development	7	(United States) Hanna Zellers	4–6
Jay Howard's Motorsports Driver Development	25	(United States) Christian Bogle	4–6
BAR Driver Development	05	(United States) Ben Anderson	4, 6
Full Gas Motorsports	06	(United States) Jake French	1–3, 6
Global Racing Group	8	(United States) Angela Durazo	1–3
Global Racing Group	19	(United States) Blake Upton	All
Global Racing Group	24	(Denmark) Benjamin Pedersen	All
Global Racing Group	66	(United States) Parker Locke	1–5
DC Autosport with Cape Motorsports	9	(United States) Dakota Dickerson	All
DC Autosport with Cape Motorsports	52	(United States) Robert Allaer	4
DC Autosport with Cape Motorsports	75	(United States) Alex Mayer	5–6
DC Autosport with Cape Motorsports	91	(Brazil) Eduardo Barrichello	All
PR1 Motorsports	09	(United States) Scott Huffaker	6
PR1 Motorsports	96	(United States) Calder McWhinney	6
Primus Racing	11	(United States) James Goughary	3, 5
Primus Racing	11	(United States) Aidan Yoder	6
Primus Racing	57	(United States) Justin Gordon	1–3
Primus Racing	94	(Republic of Ireland) Jordan Dempsey	1
DEForce Racing	12	(United Kingdom) James Raven	All
DEForce Racing	23	(Brazil) Francisco Porto	4–6
DEForce Racing	55	(United States) Kory Enders	5–6
Miller Vinatieri Motorsports	14	(United States) Dylan Tavella	All
Miller Vinatieri Motorsports	40	(United States) Jack William Miller	All
Alliance Racing	15	(United States) Chandler Horton	1, 3–6
Alliance Racing	28	(United States) Will Edwards	1, 3–6
Century Auto Racing	17	(United States) Vincent Khristov	1–3
Century Auto Racing	35	(United States) Chris Archinaco	1–4
Century Auto Racing	77	(United Kingdom) Matthew Cowley	1–3
Abel Motorsports	21	(United States) Jacob Loomis	1–2, 4
Abel Motorsports	22	(United States) Jacob Abel	1–5
Group-A Racing	26	(United States) Sam Paley	2–3
Group-A Racing	26	(United States) Ricco Shlaimoun	4–6
Group-A Racing	44	(United States) Ethan Billions	1–2
Group-A Racing	44	(United States) David Porcelli	5
Group-A Racing	44	(United States) Shehan Chandrasoma	6
Group-A Racing	93	(South Africa) Cameron O'Connor	All
Crosslink Racing with Kiwi Motorsport	29	(Denmark) Aske Nygaard Bramming	6
Crosslink Racing with Kiwi Motorsport	30	(Brazil) Arthur Leist	All
Crosslink Racing with Kiwi Motorsport	31	(New Zealand) Conrad Clark	All
Crosslink Racing with Kiwi Motorsport	32	(Puerto Rico) José Blanco-Chock	All
Crosslink Racing with Kiwi Motorsport	33	(Australia) Joshua Car	All
Crosslink Racing with Kiwi Motorsport	34	(United States) Austin Kaszuba	All
Team BENIK; Velocity Racing Developments	37	(United States) Sabré Cook	5–6
Team BENIK; Velocity Racing Developments	51	(United Kingdom) Oliver Clarke	All
K-Hill Motorsports	88	(United States) Kaylen Frederick	1
Margraf Racing	TBA	(United States) Ryan McElwee	6

== Race calendar ==
The calendar was unveiled on 9 December 2017. All races were held in the United States.

Round		Circuit	Date	Pole position	Fastest lap	Winning driver	Winning team	Supporting
1	R1	Virginia International Raceway, Alton	28 April	(Denmark) Benjamin Pedersen	(United Kingdom) Teddy Wilson	(Denmark) Benjamin Pedersen	Global Racing Group	Pirelli World Challenge; SprintX GT Championship
1	R2	Virginia International Raceway, Alton	29 April		(Denmark) Christian Rasmussen	(Denmark) Christian Rasmussen	Jay Howard's Motorsports Driver Development	Pirelli World Challenge; SprintX GT Championship
1	R3	Virginia International Raceway, Alton	29 April		(Denmark) Christian Rasmussen	(Denmark) Christian Rasmussen	Jay Howard's Motorsports Driver Development	Pirelli World Challenge; SprintX GT Championship
2	R1	Road Atlanta, Braselton	11 May	(Denmark) Christian Rasmussen	(Denmark) Benjamin Pedersen	(Denmark) Benjamin Pedersen	Global Racing Group	Formula D
2	R2	Road Atlanta, Braselton	12 May		(United States) Dakota Dickerson	(United Kingdom) James Raven	DEForce Racing	Formula D
2	R3	Road Atlanta, Braselton	12 May		(Denmark) Benjamin Pedersen	(Puerto Rico) José Blanco-Chock	Crosslink Racing with Kiwi Motorsport	Formula D
3	R1	Mid-Ohio Sports Car Course, Lexington	30 June	(United States) Dakota Dickerson	(United States) Dakota Dickerson	(United States) Dakota Dickerson	DC Autosport with Cape Motorsports	Atlantic Championship
3	R2	Mid-Ohio Sports Car Course, Lexington	1 July		(United Kingdom) James Raven	(Denmark) Christian Rasmussen	Jay Howard's Motorsports Driver Development	Atlantic Championship
3	R3	Mid-Ohio Sports Car Course, Lexington	1 July		(Denmark) Christian Rasmussen	(Denmark) Christian Rasmussen	Jay Howard's Motorsports Driver Development	Atlantic Championship
4	R1	Pittsburgh International Race Complex, Wampum	4 August	(Puerto Rico) José Blanco-Chock (Note: Arthur Leist and Joshua Car qualified first and second but were handed grid penalties for failing to respect the red flag, thus handing pole position to the third fastest qualifier José Blanco-Chock.)	(Puerto Rico) José Blanco-Chock	(Puerto Rico) José Blanco-Chock	Crosslink Racing with Kiwi Motorsport	Trans-Am Series; Atlantic Championship; F3 Americas Championship
4	R2	Pittsburgh International Race Complex, Wampum	5 August		(Australia) Joshua Car	(Australia) Joshua Car	Crosslink Racing with Kiwi Motorsport	Trans-Am Series; Atlantic Championship; F3 Americas Championship
4	R3	Pittsburgh International Race Complex, Wampum	5 August		(Brazil) Arthur Leist	(Australia) Joshua Car	Crosslink Racing with Kiwi Motorsport	Trans-Am Series; Atlantic Championship; F3 Americas Championship
5	R1	New Jersey Motorsports Park, Millville	15 September	(United Kingdom) Teddy Wilson	(United States) Kent Vaccaro	(Puerto Rico) José Blanco-Chock	Crosslink Racing with Kiwi Motorsport	Atlantic Championship; F3 Americas Championship
5	R2	New Jersey Motorsports Park, Millville	16 September		(United Kingdom) James Raven	(United States) Dakota Dickerson	DC Autosport with Cape Motorsports	Atlantic Championship; F3 Americas Championship
5	R3	New Jersey Motorsports Park, Millville	16 September		(United States) Dakota Dickerson	(United States) Dakota Dickerson	DC Autosport with Cape Motorsports	Atlantic Championship; F3 Americas Championship
6	R1	Circuit of the Americas, Austin	20 October	(United States) Dakota Dickerson	(United States) Dakota Dickerson	(United States) Dakota Dickerson	DC Autosport with Cape Motorsports	Formula One; F3 Americas Championship
6	R2	Circuit of the Americas, Austin	21 October		(Denmark) Christian Rasmussen	(Denmark) Christian Rasmussen	Jay Howard's Motorsports Driver Development	Formula One; F3 Americas Championship

== Championship standings ==
Points were awarded as follows:

Position	**1st**	**2nd**	**3rd**	**4th**	**5th**	**6th**	**7th**	**8th**	**9th**	**10th**
Points	25	18	15	12	10	8	6	4	2	1

=== Drivers' standings ===
Pos	Driver	VIR			ROA			MOH			PIT			NJM			COTA		Pts
1	(United States) Dakota Dickerson	3	2	3	3	2	4	**1**	2	5	6	4	5	2	1	1	**1**	Ret	269
2	(United Kingdom) James Raven	7	8	Ret	2	1	2	4	4	2	13	2	4	4	2	4	3	6	208
3	(Denmark) Christian Rasmussen	2	1	1	**Ret**	12	17	2	1	1	5	24	9	9	9	10	2	1	196
4	(Australia) Joshua Car	4	6	4	Ret	21	7	7	10	6	4	1	1	6	7	3	7	2	168
5	(Denmark) Benjamin Pedersen	**1**	4	5	1	4	3	5	5	4	3	21	7	8	Ret	14	5	Ret	166
6	(Puerto Rico) José Blanco-Chock	6	10	25	5	3	1	19	Ret	DNS	**1**	19	2	1	3	21	Ret	4	154
7	(United Kingdom) Teddy Wilson	29	3	2	Ret	18	19	3	3	3	8	3	Ret	**7**	4	2	10	17	134
8	(United States) Austin Kaszuba	5	29	6	4	7	6	10	13	8	2	5	6	30	Ret	13	14	16	85
9	(Brazil) Arthur Leist	15	24	9	13	14	Ret	6	9	7	7	10	3	3	6	5	27	27	73
10	(United States) Kent Vaccaro	27	Ret	24	16	13	Ret	Ret	23	20	Ret	Ret	8	5	DSQ	6	8	9	28
11	(United States) Kory Enders													13	24	DNS	4	3	27
12	(New Zealand) Conrad Clark	28	12	Ret	10	9	9	9	11	13	9	7	Ret	11	5	24	9	12	27
13	(United States) Jacob Loomis	9	5	12	8	6	Ret				26	17	11						24
14	(United States) Braden Eves	10	17	8	6	5	10	22	12	14									24
15	(United States) Jacob Abel	23	7	7	12	11	8	11	6	Ret	15	12	13	WD					24
16	(United States) Justin Gordon	11	26	19	7	10	5	23	7	Ret									23
17	(United States) Wyatt Brichacek	8	9	17	19	28	Ret	12	15	Ret	Ret	Ret	14	16	12	15	12	5	16
18	(United States) Jack William Miller	30	19	14	14	Ret	DNS	8	DSQ	19	11	6	Ret	DNS	26	23	16	Ret	12
19	(United Kingdom) Oliver Clarke	Ret	21	23	21	23	15	24	Ret	Ret	20	11	DSQ	19	29	7	28	7	12
20	(Brazil) Eduardo Barrichello	13	18	21	9	8	Ret	14	14	10	18	14	12	12	8	11	11	11	11
21	(United States) Scott Huffaker																6	14	8
22	(Brazil) Francisco Porto										10	15	10	10	10	22	13	10	5
23	(United States) Sam Paley				15	17	Ret	13	8	11									4
24	(United States) Alex Mayer													17	11	8	17	Ret	4
25	(United States) Chandler Horton	21	28	20				Ret	21	15	17	8	15	28	15	12	24	Ret	4
26	(Denmark) Aske Nygaard Bramming																Ret	8	4
27	(South Africa) Cameron O'Conner	18	13	11	17	16	Ret	Ret	Ret	18	12	9	Ret	21	18	Ret			2
28	(United States) Vincent Khristov	14	Ret	18	23	27	14	26	Ret	9									2
29	(United States) David Porcelli													18	23	9			2
30	(United States) Jake French	22	11	10	DNQ			Ret	DNS	WD									1
31	(United Kingdom) Matthew Cowley	12	Ret	Ret	11	15	11	25	Ret	Ret									0
32	(United States) Parker Locke	20	16	16	26	25	16	16	17	12	19	16	17	15	13	Ret			0
33	(United States) Aidan Yoder	24	20	26	18	19	12										26	19	0
34	(United States) Kaylen Frederick	Ret	23	12															0
35	(United States) Dylan Tavella	19	14	15	25	20	13	17	16	17	14	13	Ret	20	14	Ret	23	Ret	0
36	(United States) Blake Upton	25	25	28	24	24	18	21	20	Ret	21	18	16	23	19	Ret	20	13	0
37	(United States) James Goughary							15	19	Ret				14	25	Ret			0
38	(United States) Chris Archinaco	17	15	22	20	26	Ret	18	18	16	16	Ret	Ret						0
39	(United States) Sabré Cook													25	16	16	19	15	0
40	(United States) Ben Anderson										25	22	21				15	21	0
41	(United States) Ethan Billions	16	22	27	22	22	Ret												0
42	(United States) William Lambros													22	17	18			0
43	(United States) Christian Bogle										23	20	20	26	20	17	29	22	0
44	(United States) Shehan Chandrasoma																18	18	0
45	(United States) Ricco Shlaimoun										24	26	18	27	21	Ret	22	23	0
46	(United States) Daniel Berry													29	22	19	30	24	0
47	(United States) Robert Allaer										Ret	DNS	19						0
48	(United States) Hanna Zellers										22	25	NC	24	27	Ret	21	20	0
49	(United States) Will Edwards	DNQ						DNQ			Ret	23	22†	31	28	20	25	26	0
50	(United States) Angela Durazo	26	27	Ret	DNQ			20	22	Ret									0
51	(United States) Calder McWhinney																Ret	25	0
—	(Republic of Ireland) Jordan Dempsey	Ret	Ret	DNS															—
—	(United States) Ryan McElwee																WD	WD	—
Pos	Driver	VIR			ROA			MOH			PIT			NJM			COTA		Pts

Colour	Result
Gold	Winner
Silver	Second place
Bronze	Third place
Green	Points classification
Blue	Non-points classification
Blue	Non-classified finish (NC)
Purple	Retired, not classified (Ret)
Red	Did not qualify (DNQ)
Red	Did not pre-qualify (DNPQ)
Black	Disqualified (DSQ)
White	Did not start (DNS)
White	Withdrew (WD)
White	Race cancelled (C)
Blank	Did not practice (DNP)
Blank	Did not arrive (DNA)
Blank	Excluded (EX)

**Bold** – Pole
Italics – Fastest Lap
† — Did not finish, but classified

=== Teams' standings ===
Pos	Team	Pts
1	Crosslink Kiwi Motorsports	407
2	Jay Howard's Motorsports Driver Development	363
3	DC Autosports w/ Cape Motorsports	284
4	DEForce Racing	239
5	Global Racing Group	166
6	Abel Motorsports	48
7	Skip Barber Momentum F4	28
8	Primus Racing	23
9	Miller Vinatieri Motorsports	12
10	Velocity Racing Developments	12
11	PR1 Motorsports	8
12	Group-A Racing	8
13	Alliance Racing	4
14	Century Auto Racing	2
15	Full Gas Motorsports	1
16	K-Hill Motorsports	0
17	BAR Driver Development	0
