= Formula 4 United States Championship =

Racing series

- Category: FIA Formula 4
- Country: United States; Canada
- Region: North America
- Inaugural season: 2016
- Constructors: Ligier Automotive
- Engine suppliers: Honda (2016–2023); Ligier Automotive (2024–present)
- Tyre suppliers: Hankook
- Drivers' champion: (United States) Cooper Shipman
- Teams' champion: (United States) Kiwi Motorsport
- Official website: https://www.f4uschampionship.com

The Formula 4 United States Championship is an auto racing series that is held under FIA Formula 4 regulations. The championship is sanctioned by SCCA Pro Racing, the professional racing division of the Sports Car Club of America, in conjunction with the Automobile Competition Committee for the United States, the United States representative to the FIA. It is a spec series, with all competitors using the same chassis and engine.

The championship is designed to support North American drivers entering international open-wheel racing, by using the same regulations used by other series globally, rather than compete with the existing IndyCar Road to Indy ladder, with the drivers earning points towards an FIA Superlicence. Originally, it served as an initial step into car racing for drivers graduating from karting, but that level was supplanted by the JSF4 Championship, launched in 2024 with the previous generation cars in order to give drivers another entry level series where the champion earns a funded ride to the United States F4 Championship.

== Championship format ==
Each event of the championship consists of three races, which are run on the support package of other motorsport events in the United States and starting in 2017, Canada. The inaugural season consisted of five events, and expanded to additional rounds in the following seasons. Initially only run at race tracks on the East Coast of the United States, the championship will expand to separate East and West Coast series in the future with Canadian rounds in association with United States–based series.

The chassis is provided by Onroak Automotive, with a 2000cc Honda K20 detuned to 160hp and supplied by Honda Performance Development, which both meet the FIA price caps for Formula 4. The tyres were by provided by Pirelli until 2018 season and by Hankook since 2019, and are similarly price capped. The total cost for a driver to compete in a full season of the 2016 championship is estimated at $115,000.

== Champions ==
=== Drivers ===
Season	Champion	Team	Races	Wins	Poles	Fastest lap	Podiums	Points	Margins
2016	(United States) Cameron Das	(United States) JDX Racing	15	9	4	9	9	281	57
2017	(United States) Kyle Kirkwood	(United States) Cape Motorsports	20	9	4	10	15	345	183
2018	(United States) Dakota Dickerson	(United States) DC Autosport with Cape Motorsports	17	6	1	5	15	299	79
2019	(Australia) Joshua Car	(United States) Crosslink Racing with Kiwi Motorsport	17	4	2	4	11	269	61
2020	(United States) Hunter Yeany	(United States) Velocity Racing Development	16	8	1	6	15	285	57
2021	(Mexico) Noel León	(United States) DEForce Racing	17	2	4	1	10	212	20.5
2022	(Australia) Lochie Hughes	(United States) Jay Howard Driver Development	18	6	2	5	10	277	55
2023	(Canada) Patrick Woods-Toth	(United States) Crosslink/Kiwi Motorsport	18	4	1	2	14	263.5	82.5
2024	(Australia) Daniel Quimby	(Canada) Atlantic Racing Team	15	5	1	3	10	227.5	4.5
2025	(United States) Cooper Shipman	(United States) Kiwi Motorsport	15	9	4	8	13	298.5	32.5

=== Teams ===
Season	Team	Drivers	Wins	Poles	Fastest lap	Podiums	Points	Margins
2016	(United States) JDX Racing	3	9	4	9	10	353	11
2017	(United States) Cape Motorsports	4	9	4	10	15	433	165
2018	(United States) Crosslink Racing with Kiwi Motorsport	6	5	3	3	13	407	44
2019	(United States) Crosslink Racing with Kiwi Motorsport	6	9	5	11	25	537	195
2020	(United States) Crosslink Racing with Kiwi Motorsport	7	9	4	9	26	557	123
2021	(United States) Velocity Racing Development	5	8	1	8	17	381.5	144
2022	(United States) Crosslink Racing with Kiwi Motorsport	8	5	1	1	18	447.5	41.5
2023	(United States) Crosslink/Kiwi Motorsport	9	7	4	6	26	541.5	325.5
2024	(United States) Crosslink/Kiwi Motorsport	4	5	3	9	16	422	194.5
2025	(United States) Kiwi Motorsport	4	9	4	8	20	507	118.5

== Circuits ==
Green dots represent circuits as of the 2026 season, purple represent the returning circuits, red represent former circuits.
- **Bold** denotes a current circuit is used in the 2026 season.
  - Italic denotes a returning circuit will be used in the 2027 season.

Number	Circuits	Rounds	Years
1	**Mid-Ohio Sports Car Course**	10 (Note: Mid-Ohio Sports Car Course hosted 2 rounds in 2016.)	2016–present
2	(Texas) Circuit of the Americas	9 (Note: Circuit of the Americas hosted 2 rounds in 2017.)	2017–2024
2	**Virginia International Raceway**	9	2017–2023, 2025–present
4	**New Jersey Motorsports Park**	7	2016, 2018, 2022–2026
5	(Wisconsin) **Road America**	6	2021–present
6	(Georgia (U.S. state)) **Road Atlanta**	4	2016, 2018–2019, 2021, 2027
6	(Louisiana) **NOLA Motorsports Park**	4	2022–2023, 2025–2026
8	(Florida) Homestead-Miami Speedway	3	2016–2017, 2020
8	(Ontario) **Canadian Tire Motorsport Park**	3 (Note: Canadian Tire Motorsport Park will host 2 rounds in 2027.)	2017, 2024-present
8	(Alabama) **Barber Motorsports Park**	3	2020, 2025–present
11	(Pennsylvania) Pittsburgh International Race Complex	2	2018–2019
11	(Florida) Sebring International Raceway	2	2019–2020
13	(Indiana) Indianapolis Motor Speedway	1	2017
13	(Minnesota) Brainerd International Raceway	1	2021
