= USF Pro Championships =

Racing driver development program

USF Pro Championships logo

Road to Indy logo

The USF Pro Championships Presented by Continental Tire, formerly known as the Road to Indy Presented by Cooper Tires, is a racecar driver development program, providing a scholarship-funded path to reach the IndyCar Series and Indianapolis 500. Sanctioned by the United States Auto Club (USAC), the series are owned and managed by Andersen Promotions.

Since its launch in 2010, the ladder system has attracted competitors from around the globe, who have showcased their talents at premier venues on a mix of road courses, temporary street circuits, and ovals.

== Participating series (in order from lowest to highest ranking) ==
Series Name	Description	Year founded
USF Juniors	A first step on the pathway for younger drivers. Sanctioned by USAC	2022
USF2000 Championship	Competing for a scholarship to the next stage of the pathway. Sanctioned by USAC	1990
USF Pro 2000 Championship	Competing for a scholarship to the next stage of the pathway. Sanctioned by USAC	1991
Indy NXT	A developmental championship supporting IndyCar Series at specific races across the season. Sanctioned by IndyCar	1977 (predecessor); 1986 (original); 2002 (current)
IndyCar Series	Highest class of American open-wheel formula racing cars. Sanctioned by IndyCar	1996 with history going back to the early 1900s

In 2021 Kyle Kirkwood won the Indy Lights championship and became the first driver to win a championship and thus scholarship at every rung of the ladder on his way to IndyCar. However, both Sage Karam and Matthew Brabham won scholarships from U.S. F2000 and made it to IndyCar. Karam, Brabham, Tristan Vautier, Oliver Askew, and Spencer Pigot have all won two scholarships on their way to IndyCar. In 2017, Josef Newgarden became the first Road to Indy graduate and scholarship winner to win the IndyCar Series championship.

== Mazda Road to Indy Shootout ==
From 2016 to 2018, a shootout race for up-and-coming talents was held. In a knock-out format, drivers who won championships in various beginner-level series were invited to compete for a $200,000 scholarship to race in the USF2000 series.

=== Shootout winners ===
Year	Track	Winner
2016	Mazda Raceway Laguna Seca	(United States) Oliver Askew
2017	Wild Horse Pass Motorsports Park	(Republic of Ireland) Keith Donegan
2018	Wild Horse Pass Motorsports Park	(New Zealand) Hunter McElrea

== Champions ==
IndyCar Series		Indy NXT		USF Pro 2000		USF2000		USF Juniors	
2010	(United Kingdom) Dario Franchitti	2010	(France) Jean-Karl Vernay	2010	(United States) Conor Daly	2010	(United States) Sage Karam	Not Held	
2011	(United Kingdom) Dario Franchitti	2011	(United States) Josef Newgarden	2011	(France) Tristan Vautier	2011	(Finland) Petri Suvanto	Not Held	
2012	(United States) Ryan Hunter-Reay	2012	(France) Tristan Vautier	2012	(United Kingdom) Jack Hawksworth	2012	(Australia) Matthew Brabham	Not Held	
2013	(New Zealand) Scott Dixon	2013	(United States) Sage Karam	2013	(Australia) Matthew Brabham	2013	(Canada) Scott Hargrove	Not Held	
2014	(Australia) Will Power	2014	(Colombia) Gabby Chaves	2014	(United States) Spencer Pigot	2014	(France) Florian Latorre	Not Held	
2015	(New Zealand) Scott Dixon	2015	(United States) Spencer Pigot	2015	(Uruguay) Santiago Urrutia	2015	(France) Nico Jamin	Not Held	
2016	(France) Simon Pagenaud	2016	(United Arab Emirates) Ed Jones	2016	(United States) Aaron Telitz	2016	(Australia) Anthony Martin	Not Held	
2017	(United States) Josef Newgarden	2017	(United States) Kyle Kaiser	2017	(Brazil) Victor Franzoni	2017	(United States) Oliver Askew	Not Held	
2018	(New Zealand) Scott Dixon	2018	(Mexico) Patricio O'Ward	2018	(Netherlands) Rinus VeeKay	2018	(United States) Kyle Kirkwood	Not Held	
2019	(United States) Josef Newgarden	2019	(United States) Oliver Askew	2019	(United States) Kyle Kirkwood	2019	(United States) Braden Eves	Not Held	
2020	(New Zealand) Scott Dixon	2020	Not held (COVID-19 pandemic)	2020	(United States) Sting Ray Robb	2020	(Denmark) Christian Rasmussen	Not Held	
2021	(Spain) Álex Palou	2021	(United States) Kyle Kirkwood	2021	(Denmark) Christian Rasmussen	2021	(Brazil) Kiko Porto	Not Held	
2022	(Australia) Will Power	2022	(Sweden) Linus Lundqvist	2022	(United Kingdom) Louis Foster	2022	(United States) Michael d'Orlando	2022	(Canada) Mac Clark
2023	(Spain) Álex Palou	2023	(Denmark) Christian Rasmussen	2023	(United States) Myles Rowe	2023	(United States) Simon Sikes	2023	(Brazil) Nicolas Giaffone
2024	(Spain) Álex Palou	2024	(United Kingdom) Louis Foster	2024	(Australia) Lochie Hughes	2024	(United States) Max Garcia	2024	(United States) Max Taylor
2025	(Spain) Álex Palou	2025	(Norway) Dennis Hauger	2025	(United States) Max Garcia	2025	(United States) Jack Jeffers	2025	(Brazil) Leonardo Escorpioni
2026	(Spain) Álex Palou	2026	(United States) Nikita Johnson	2026	(United States) Jack Jeffers	2026	(Colombia) Sebastián Garzón	2026	(Poland) Karol Pasiewicz
