= 2019 U.S. F2000 National Championship =

Car racing competition

The 2019 Cooper Tires USF2000 Championship was the tenth season – since its revival in 2010 – of the U.S. F2000 National Championship, an open wheel auto racing series that is the first step in INDYCAR's Road to Indy ladder, operated by Andersen Promotions.

American Braden Eves of Cape Motorsports won the championship in a tightly contested points race by winning the final race at WeatherTech Raceway Laguna Seca over New Zealander Hunter McElrea of Pabst Racing. Eves won six times with two other podium finishes while McElrea, who had won the Road to Indy Shootout to earn his place on the U.S. F2000 grid, won four times with eight other podiums. Danish driver Christian Rasmussen won three races and finished tied for the third most points with American Colin Kaminsky. Rasmussen won third by virtue of Kaminsky not capturing any race wins. Darren Keane won one race and finished fifth in the championship. Australian Cameron Shields, who ended his championship campaign after the Toronto round, was the sole other race winner on the season.

Pabst Racing won its third straight team championship despite their top driver McElrea losing out on the drivers' championship.

== Drivers and teams ==
Team	No.	Drivers	Status	Rounds
BN Racing	27	(United States) Zach Holden		1–4
BN Racing	27	(United Kingdom) Matthew Round-Garrido	R	6–11
BN Racing	28	(Venezuela) Anthony Famularo	R	1–7
Cape Motorsports	2	(United States) Darren Keane		All
Cape Motorsports	3	(United States) Reece Gold	R	All
Cape Motorsports	4	(United States) Jak Crawford	R	10–15
Cape Motorsports	8	(United States) Braden Eves	R	All
DEForce Racing	12	(Mexico) Manuel Sulaimán	R	All
DEForce Racing	52	(United States) Jak Crawford	R	3–9
DEForce Racing	91	(Brazil) Eduardo Barrichello	R	12–15
Exclusive Autosport	90	(Mexico) Manuel Cabrera		1–5
Jay Howard Driver Development	5	(United Kingdom) Matthew Round-Garrido	R	1–5
Jay Howard Driver Development	5	(United States) Josh Green	R	12–13
Jay Howard Driver Development	5	(United States) Wyatt Brichacek	R	14–15
Jay Howard Driver Development	6	(Denmark) Christian Rasmussen	R	All
Jay Howard Driver Development	7	(United States) Christian Bogle	R	All
Legacy Autosport	14	(France) Alex Baron		1–7
Legacy Autosport	14	(United States) Zach Holden		8–15
Legacy Autosport	77	(Mexico) José Sierra		1–2
Legacy Autosport	77	(United States) Dakota Dickerson		3–4
Legacy Autosport	77	(United States) Timmy Pagliuso	R	10–11
Legacy Autosport	77	(United States) Ayrton Ori	R	12–15
Miller Vinatieri Motorsports	40	(United States) Jack William Miller	R	All
Miller Vinatieri Motorsports	41	(Brazil) Eduardo Barrichello	R	1–11
Newman Wachs Racing	36	(United States) Nolan Siegel	R	All
Newman Wachs Racing	73	(Australia) Cameron Shields	R	1–9
Newman Wachs Racing	73	(United States) Kyle Dupell		12–15
Pabst Racing Services	21	(United States) Yuven Sundaramoorthy	R	All
Pabst Racing Services	22	(New Zealand) Hunter McElrea	R	All
Pabst Racing Services	23	(United States) Colin Kaminsky		All
Pabst Racing Services	24	(Brazil) Bruna Tomaselli		All
Team E-JAY Racing	69	(United States) Nate Aranda	R	1–2

Icon	Class
R	Rookie

== Schedule ==
A 15-race schedule was announced on September 25, 2018, consisting of five permanent road courses and two street circuits on the NTT IndyCar Series schedule each hosting doubleheaders, and a single race at the Dave Steele Classic on a short oval.

Icon	Legend
O	Oval/Speedway
R	Road course
S	Street circuit

Rd.	Date	Race name	Track	Location
1	March 9–10	USF2000 St. Petersburg Grand Prix	S Streets of St. Petersburg	St. Petersburg, Florida
2	March 9–10	USF2000 St. Petersburg Grand Prix	S Streets of St. Petersburg	St. Petersburg, Florida
3	May 10–11	USF2000 Grand Prix of Indianapolis	R Indianapolis Motor Speedway Road Course	Speedway, Indiana
4	May 10–11	USF2000 Grand Prix of Indianapolis	R Indianapolis Motor Speedway Road Course	Speedway, Indiana
5	May 24	Cooper Tires Freedom 75	O Lucas Oil Raceway	Clermont, Indiana
6	June 22–23	Cooper Tires USF2000 Grand Prix of Road America	R Road America	Elkhart Lake, Wisconsin
7	June 22–23	Cooper Tires USF2000 Grand Prix of Road America	R Road America	Elkhart Lake, Wisconsin
8	July 13–14	Cooper Tires USF2000 Grand Prix	S Exhibition Place	Toronto, Ontario
9	July 13–14	Cooper Tires USF2000 Grand Prix	S Exhibition Place	Toronto, Ontario
10	July 27–28	Cooper Tires USF2000 Grand Prix of Mid-Ohio	R Mid-Ohio Sports Car Course	Lexington, Ohio
11	July 27–28	Cooper Tires USF2000 Grand Prix of Mid-Ohio	R Mid-Ohio Sports Car Course	Lexington, Ohio
12	August 31–September 1	Cooper Tires USF2000 Portland Grand Prix	R Portland International Raceway	Portland, Oregon
13	August 31–September 1	Cooper Tires USF2000 Portland Grand Prix	R Portland International Raceway	Portland, Oregon
14	September 21–22	Cooper Tires USF2000 Grand Prix at WRLS	R WeatherTech Raceway Laguna Seca	Monterey, California
15	September 21–22	Cooper Tires USF2000 Grand Prix at WRLS	R WeatherTech Raceway Laguna Seca	Monterey, California

== Race results ==
Round	Race	Pole position	Fastest lap	Most laps led	Race winner	
Round	Race	Pole position	Fastest lap	Most laps led	Driver	Team
1	Streets of St. Petersburg	(United States) Braden Eves	(United States) Darren Keane	(United States) Braden Eves	(United States) Braden Eves	Cape Motorsports
2	Streets of St. Petersburg	(United States) Darren Keane	(Denmark) Christian Rasmussen	(United States) Darren Keane	(United States) Braden Eves	Cape Motorsports
3	Indianapolis Motor Speedway Road Course	(United States) Braden Eves	(United States) Darren Keane	(United States) Braden Eves	(United States) Braden Eves	Cape Motorsports
4	Indianapolis Motor Speedway Road Course	(United States) Braden Eves	(United States) Braden Eves	(United States) Braden Eves	(United States) Braden Eves	Cape Motorsports
5	Lucas Oil Raceway	(United States) Colin Kaminsky	(Australia) Cameron Shields	(Australia) Cameron Shields	(Australia) Cameron Shields	Newman Wachs Racing
6	Road America	(United States) Colin Kaminsky	(United States) Braden Eves	(New Zealand) Hunter McElrea	(New Zealand) Hunter McElrea	Pabst Racing Services
7	Road America	(New Zealand) Hunter McElrea	(United States) Darren Keane	(United States) Braden Eves	(United States) Braden Eves	Cape Motorsports
8	Streets of Toronto	(Denmark) Christian Rasmussen	(United States) Darren Keane	(United States) Darren Keane (Denmark) Christian Rasmussen	(United States) Darren Keane	Cape Motorsports
9	Streets of Toronto	(United States) Darren Keane	(United States) Darren Keane	(Denmark) Christian Rasmussen	(Denmark) Christian Rasmussen	Jay Howard Driver Development
10	Mid-Ohio Sports Car Course	(New Zealand) Hunter McElrea	(Denmark) Christian Rasmussen	(Denmark) Christian Rasmussen	(Denmark) Christian Rasmussen	Jay Howard Driver Development
11	Mid-Ohio Sports Car Course	(New Zealand) Hunter McElrea	(New Zealand) Hunter McElrea	(New Zealand) Hunter McElrea	(New Zealand) Hunter McElrea	Pabst Racing Services
12	Portland International Raceway	(New Zealand) Hunter McElrea	(New Zealand) Hunter McElrea	(New Zealand) Hunter McElrea	(New Zealand) Hunter McElrea	Pabst Racing Services
13	Portland International Raceway	(New Zealand) Hunter McElrea	(Denmark) Christian Rasmussen	(New Zealand) Hunter McElrea	(New Zealand) Hunter McElrea	Pabst Racing Services
14	WeatherTech Raceway Laguna Seca	(United States) Braden Eves	(New Zealand) Hunter McElrea	(Denmark) Christian Rasmussen	(Denmark) Christian Rasmussen	Jay Howard Driver Development
15	WeatherTech Raceway Laguna Seca	(United States) Colin Kaminsky	(Denmark) Christian Rasmussen	(United States) Braden Eves	(United States) Braden Eves	Cape Motorsports

== Championship standings ==
Scoring system

Position	**1st**	**2nd**	**3rd**	**4th**	**5th**	**6th**	**7th**	**8th**	**9th**	**10th**	**11th**	**12th**	**13th**	**14th**	**15th**	**16th**	**17th**	**18th**	**19th**	**20th+**
Points (R)	30	25	22	19	17	15	14	13	12	11	10	9	8	7	6	5	4	3	2	1
Points (O)	45	38	33	29	26	23	21	20	18	17	15	14	12	11	9	8	6	5	4	2

- One point is awarded to the driver who qualifies on pole position.
- One point is awarded to the driver who leads the most laps in the race.
- One point is awarded to the driver who sets the fastest lap during the race.

=== Drivers' Championship ===
Pos	Driver	STP		IMS		LOR	ROA		TOR		MOH		POR		LAG		Points
1	(United States) Braden Eves	**1***	1	**1***	**1***	5	4	1*	4	11	8	7	2	2	**4**	1*	361
2	(New Zealand) Hunter McElrea	3	2	2	3	11	1*	**3**	3	14	**2**	**1***	**1***	**1***	2	7	356
3	(Denmark) Christian Rasmussen	4	15	20	8	6	17	5	**2***	1*	1*	2	3	17	1*	2	282
4	(United States) Colin Kaminsky	16	5	4	10	**3**	**2**	4	6	12	3	3	4	4	3	**3**	282
5	(United States) Darren Keane	7	**14***	6	2	7	12	2	1*	**2**	9	6	5	5	7	6	270
6	(Mexico) Manuel Sulaimán	2	6	3	18	9	5	16	7	4	11	8	7	7	9	11	211
7	(United States) Jak Crawford			18	4	4	14	6	12	5	7	5	6	6	5	15	183
8	(Brazil) Bruna Tomaselli	6	7	10	11	19	6	11	11	7	5	10	9	9	12	10	174
9	(United States) Zach Holden	5	3	7	21				5	15	10	4	10	3	10	4	170
10	(United States) Reece Gold	10	8	14	12	8	8	10	13	9	12	9	12	11	11	8	167
11	(Brazil) Eduardo Barrichello	13	20	19	5	13	9	7	15	17	14	11	8	8	6	5	151
12	(United States) Yuven Sundaramoorthy	8	11	12	13	12	7	12	14	8	6	14	15	14	15	9	150
13	(Australia) Cameron Shields	11	16	5	16	1*	3	9	17	6							137
14	(United Kingdom) Matthew Round-Garrido	12	9	13	17	16	15	8	8	3	4	13					122
15	(United States) Nolan Siegel	14	12	15	14	10	10	14	16	10	16	17	17	12	14	17	113
16	(United States) Jack William Miller	18	17	17	19	17	13	13	9	16	13	12	13	13	17	13	97
17	(United States) Christian Bogle	15	19	16	15	15	11	15	10	13	15	15	16	18	18	14	93
18	(France) Alex Baron	21	4	9	6	2	18	17									92
19	(Venezuela) Anthony Famularo	9	10	8	9	14	16	18									67
20	(United States) Kyle Dupell												14	15	13	12	30
21	(United States) Josh Green												11	10			21
22	(Mexico) Manuel Cabrera	19	18	11	20	18											21
23	(United States) Ayrton Ori												18	16	16	16	18
24	(United States) Wyatt Brichacek														8	18	16
25	(United States) Dakota Dickerson			21	7												15
26	(Mexico) José Sierra	17	13														12
27	(United States) Timmy Pagliuso										17	16					9
28	(United States) Nate Aranda	20	DNS														2

Color	Result
Gold	Winner
Silver	2nd place
Bronze	3rd place
Green	4th & 5th place
Light Blue	6th–10th place
Dark Blue	Finished (Outside Top 10)
Purple	Did not finish (DNF)
Red	Did not qualify (DNQ)
Brown	Withdrawn (Wth)
Black	Disqualified (DSQ)
White	Did not start (DNS)
Blank	Did not participate

**In-line notation**
**Bold**	Pole position (1 point)
Italics	Ran fastest race lap (1 point)
*	Led most race laps (1 point); Not awarded if more than one driver leads most laps
Rookie

=== Teams' championship ===
Scoring system

Position	**1st**	**2nd**	**3rd**	**4th**	**5th**	**6th**	**7th**	**8th**	**9th**	**10th+**
Points	22	18	15	12	10	8	6	4	2	1

- Single car teams receive 3 bonus points as an equivalency to multi-car teams
- Only the best two results count for teams fielding more than two entries

Pos	Team	Points
1	Pabst Racing Services	405
2	Cape Motorsports	400
3	Jay Howard Driver Development	201
4	DEForce Racing	196
5	Legacy Autosport	135
6	BN Racing	99
7	Newman Wachs Racing	93
8	Miller Vinatieri Motorsports	63
9	Exclusive Autosport	20
10	Team E-JAY	6

== See also ==
- 2019 IndyCar Series
- 2019 Indy Lights
- 2019 Indy Pro 2000 Championship
