= Hunter McElrea =

New Zealand racing driver (born 1999)

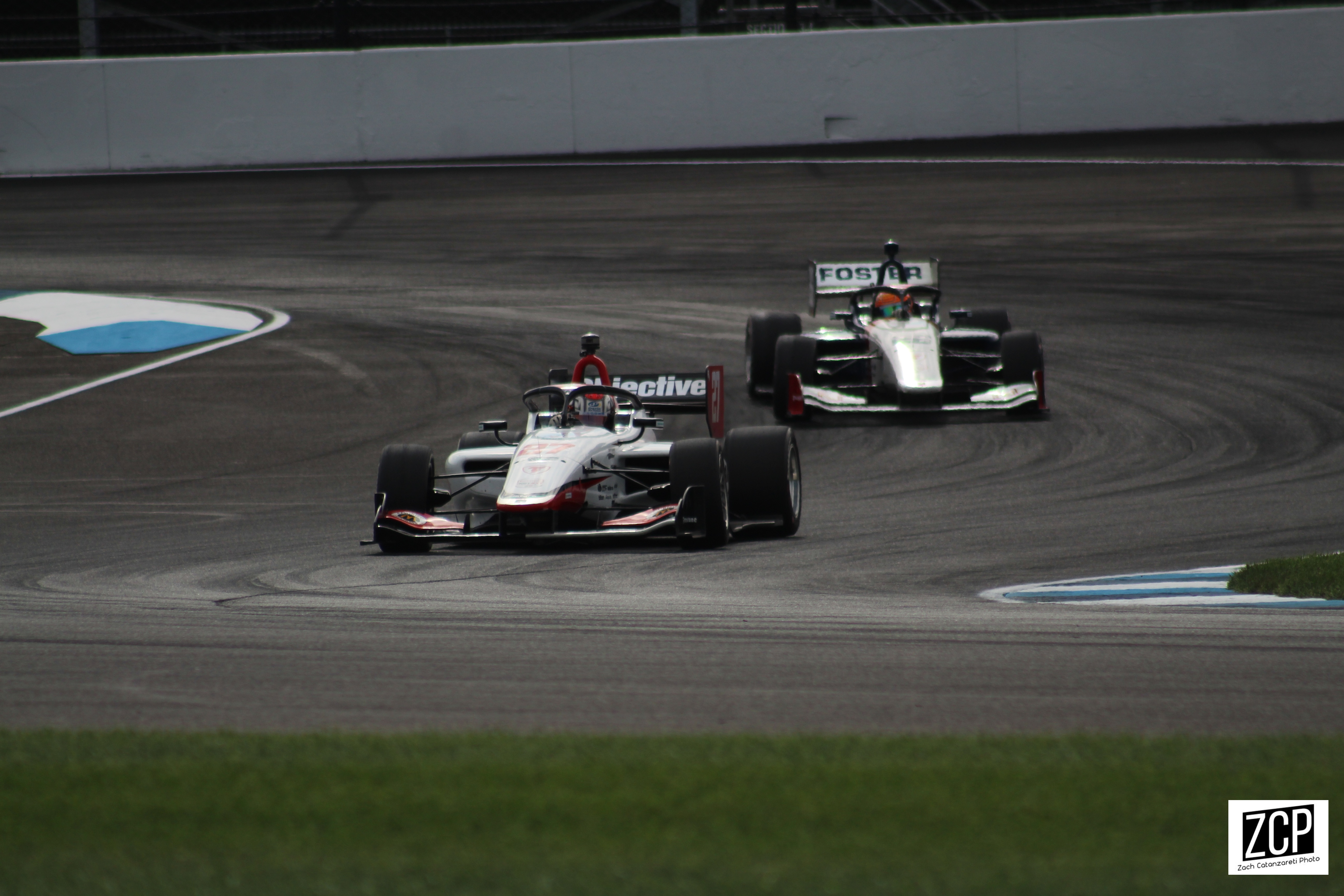
- Nationality: (New Zealand) New Zealander
- Born: 21 November 1999 (age 26) Los Angeles, California, U.S.

IMSA SportsCar Championship career
- Debut season: 2024
- Current team: TDS Racing
- Categorisation: FIA Silver
- Car number: 11
- Starts: 16 (16 entries)
- Wins: 5
- Podiums: 7
- Poles: 1
- Fastest laps: 4
- Best finish: 9th in 2025

IndyCar Series career
- 1 race run over 1 year
- Team: No. 18 (Dale Coyne Racing)
- Best finish: 41st (2024)
- First race: 2024 Honda Indy Toronto (Exhibition Place)
Wins	Podiums	Poles
0	0	0

Previous series
- 2016–18 2019 2020–21 2022–23: Australian Formula Ford; U.S. F2000 National Championship; Indy Pro 2000 Championship; Indy Lights

Championship titles
- 2024-2025 2018: IMSA Michelin Endurance Cup (LMP2); Australian Formula Ford

Hunter McElrea (born 21 November 1999 in Los Angeles, California, United States) is an American-born New Zealand racing driver currently competing in the IMSA SportsCar Championship in LMP2 for United Autosports USA. He is also the reserve driver for IndyCar Series team Ed Carpenter Racing.

== Junior career ==
=== Karting ===
McElrea began his career in karting at the age of seven.

=== Formula Ford ===
In 2015, McElrea stepped up to single-seaters, competing in Formula Ford championships in both Australia and New Zealand, sometimes with the family outfit McElrea Racing. In 2018, McElrea contested a second full season of Australian Formula Ford with Sonic Motor Racing Services, accumulating thirteen wins and becoming the first non-Australian driver to win the title since 1985.

=== Road to Indy ===
==== USF2000 Championship ====
In December 2018, McElrea won the $200,000 Mazda Road to Indy Shootout at Wild Horse Pass Motorsports Park to compete in the 2019 U.S. F2000 National Championship. Joining with Pabst Racing, McElrea claimed four victories, including back-to-back wins at Portland and ultimately finished as championship runner-up after missing out on the title five points to Braden Eves.

=== Indy Pro 2000 ===
In October 2019, McElrea reunited with Pabst to partake in the Chris Griffis Memorial Test, setting the fastest time in the Indy Pro 2000 category. In March the following year, Pabst officially confirmed McElrea as one of its entrants into the 2020 championship. His rookie season in Indy Pro 2000 netted him 5th position in championship, with six podiums and a win at the final race of the year at the Grand Prix of St. Petersburg. McElrea again signed for Pabst Racing, for the 2021 season. McElrea won races at Barber Motorsports Park, Mid-Ohio Sports Car Course and New Jersey Motorsports Park on his way to third in the championship. He also claimed seven podiums and a season leading five pole positions.

=== Indy Lights ===
McElrea signed with Andretti Autosport, for the 2022 Indy Lights season. He scored pole position on debut at the Grand Prix of St. Petersburg. In 2022, McElrea achieved three pole positions, two race wins at Mid-Ohio Sports Car Course and Iowa Speedway, and claimed 'Rookie of the Year' honours. On 3 September, Andretti Autosport announced that McElrea would join them again for the 2023 season.

== IndyCar Series ==
=== 2024 ===
Prior to the twelfth round of the 2024 IndyCar Series, Dale Coyne Racing announced that it had signed McElrea to contest the Toronto IndyCar race in their No. 18 Honda. McElrea showed good pace throughout the weekend, but ultimately retired during the race, finishing 24th.

=== 2026 ===
On 27 March 2026, Ed Carpenter Racing hired McElrea as its reserve driver for the 2026 IndyCar Series.

== Sportscar racing career ==
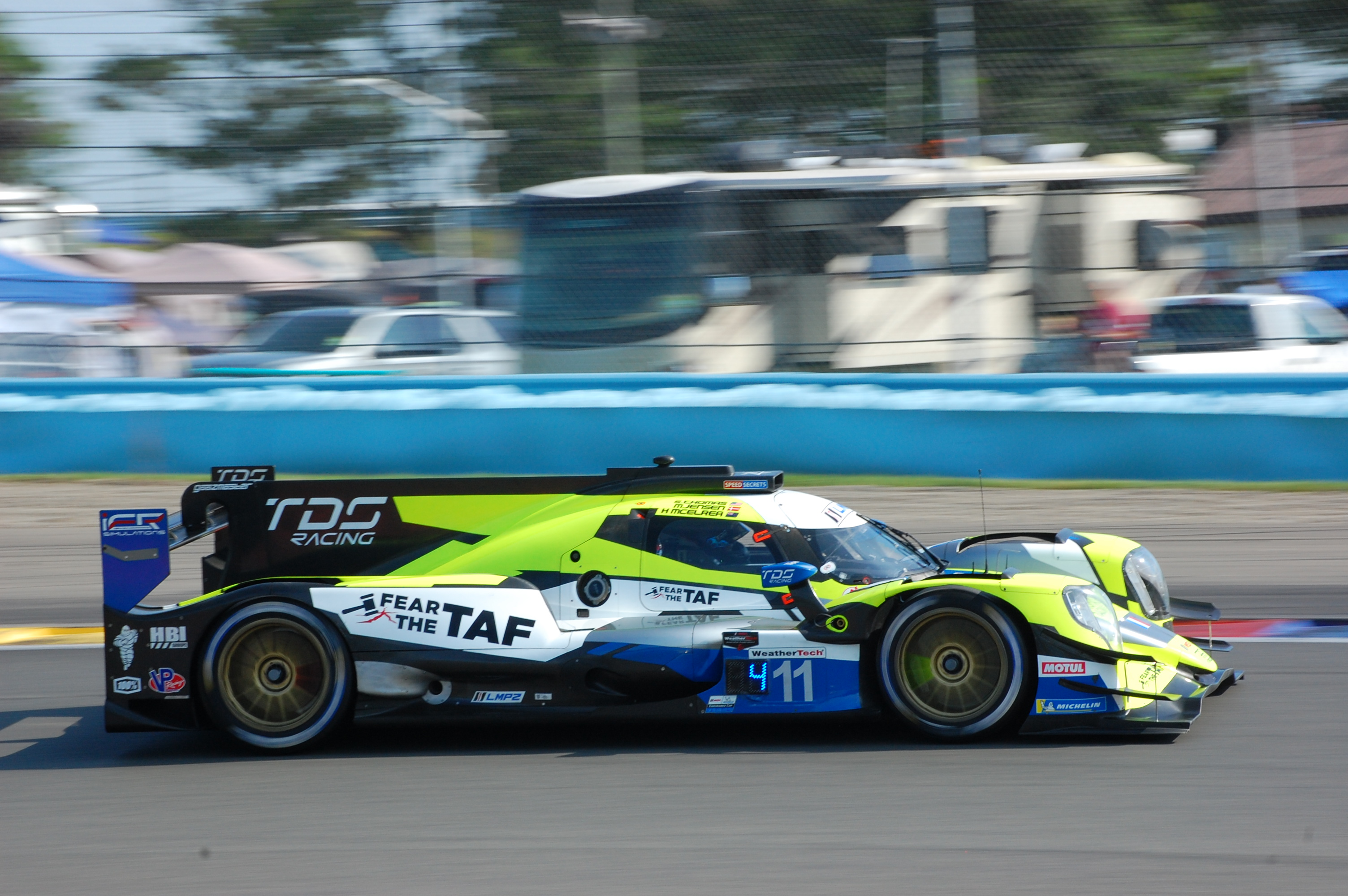
McElrea's Oreca 07 at Watkins Glen in 2025

=== IMSA SportsCar Championship ===
==== 2024 ====
In 2024, McElrea made the switch to sportscar racing and signed with TDS Racing to compete in the 2024 IMSA SportsCar Championship in LMP2. He would compete in the Michelin Endurance Cup rounds alongside Steven Thomas and Mikkel Jensen. McElrea would get his first win in the championship at Indianapolis and would win again at the 2024 Petit Le Mans.

==== 2025 ====
McElrea returned to the championship for the 2025 season, continuing to compete with TDS Racing. He would once again join Steven Thomas and Mikkel Jensen.

== Personal life ==
McElrea is the third generation in his motor racing family. His grandfather Rod McElrea won the New Zealand Beach Racing championships, in Nelson, in 1971 and the OSCA championships in 1983. His father Andy McElrea won the 1991 New Zealand Formula Ford Championship, and the 1996 New Zealand Trans-Am Championship. Andy is also the Founder & Team Principal of McElrea Racing, which competes in the Porsche Carrera Cup Australia Championship & Porsche Sprint Challenge Australia.

== Racing record ==
=== Career summary ===
Season	Series	Team	Races	Wins	Poles	F/Laps	Podiums	Points	Position
2015	Queensland Formula Ford	McElrea Racing	3	2	1	0	3	83	NC
2016	Australian Formula Ford Series	Torelli Motorsport	12	0	0	0	0	78	9th
2016	Queensland Formula Ford 1600 Series	McElrea Racing	8	6	1	3	8	117	NC
2017	Australian Formula Ford Series	Sonic Motor Racing Services	17	2	2	3	9	189	4th
2018	Australian Formula Ford Series	Sonic Motor Racing Services	21	13	3	7	16	321	**1st**
2019	U.S. F2000 National Championship	Pabst Racing	15	4	5	3	12	356	**2nd**
2020	Indy Pro 2000 Championship	Pabst Racing	17	1	0	2	6	320	5th
2021	Indy Pro 2000 Championship	Pabst Racing	18	3	5	1	7	378	**3rd**
2022	Indy Lights	Andretti Autosport	14	2	3	1	7	460	4th
2023	Indy NXT	Andretti Autosport	14	2	2	4	6	474	**2nd**
2024	IMSA SportsCar Championship - LMP2	TDS Racing	5	2	0	1	3	1563	18th
2024	IndyCar Series	Dale Coyne Racing	1	0	0	0	0	6	41st
2025	IMSA SportsCar Championship - LMP2	TDS Racing	6	2	1	2	3	1828	9th
2026	IMSA SportsCar Championship - LMP2	United Autosports USA	5	1	0	1	1	1336	21st
2026	IndyCar Series	ECR	Reserve driver						
2026-27	Asian Le Mans Series - LMP2	United Autosports							

* Season still in progress.

=== American open–wheel racing results ===
==== U.S. F2000 National Championship ====
Year	Team	1	2	3	4	5	6	7	8	9	10	11	12	13	14	15	Rank	Points
2019	Pabst Racing	STP; 1; 3	STP; 2; 2	IMS; 1; 2	IMS; 2; 3	LOR; 11	ROA; 1; 1	ROA; 2; 3	TOR; 1; 3	TOR; 2; 14	MOH; 1; 2	MOH; 2; 1	POR; 1; 1	POR; 2; 1	LAG; 1; 2	LAG; 2; 7	2nd	356

==== Indy Pro 2000 Championship ====
Year	Team	1	2	3	4	5	6	7	8	9	10	11	12	13	14	15	16	17	18	Rank	Points
2020	Pabst Racing	ROA; 1; 15	ROA; 2; 15	MOH; 1; 8	MOH; 2; 6	MOH; 3; 2	LOR; 2	GMP; 11	IMS; 1; 2	IMS; 2; 6	IMS; 3; 2	MOH; 4; 3	MOH; 5; 9	NJM; 1; 6	NJM; 2; 4	NJM; 3; 5	STP; 1; 4	STP; 2; 1		5th	320
2021	Pabst Racing	ALA; 1; 6	ALA; 2; 1	STP; 1; 3	STP; 2; 4	IMS; 1; 10	IMS; 2; 8	IMS; 3; 7	LOR; 5	ROA; 1; 7	ROA; 2; 6	MOH; 1; 4	MOH; 2; 1	GMP; 3	NJM; 1; 2	NJM; 2; 2	NJM; 3; 1	MOH; 4; 7	MOH; 5; 6	3rd	378

==== Indy Lights/Indy NXT ====
(key) (Races in bold indicate pole position) (Races in italics indicate fastest lap) (Races with ^{L} indicate a race lap led) (Races with * indicate most race laps led)

Year	Team	1	2	3	4	5	6	7	8	9	10	11	12	13	14	Rank	Points
2022	Andretti Autosport	**STP**; 14^{L}	ALA; 12	IMS; 2^{L}	IMS; 6	DET; 12	DET; 2	RDA; 3	**MOH**; 1^{L}*	**IOW**; 1^{L}*	NSH; 3	GTW; 5	POR; 5	LAG; 3	LAG; 8	4th	460
2023	Andretti Autosport	STP; 5	BAR; 13	IMS; 4	DET; 7^{L}	DET; 4	RDA; 3	MOH; 4	IOW; 5	NSH; 2	**IMS**; 1^{L}*	GMP; 3^{L}	POR; 15	**LAG**; 1^{L}*	LAG; 2	2nd	474

==== IndyCar Series ====
(key) (Races in bold indicate pole position; races in italics indicate fastest lap)

Year	Team	No.	Chassis	Engine	1	2	3	4	5	6	7	8	9	10	11	12	13	14	15	16	17	18	Rank	Points	Ref
2024	Dale Coyne Racing	18	Dallara DW12	Honda	STP	THE	LBH	ALA	IMS	INDY	DET	ROA	LAG	MOH	IOW	IOW	TOR; 24	GTW	POR	MIL	MIL	NSH	41st	6	

=== Complete IMSA SportsCar Championship results ===
(key) (Races in bold indicate pole position; results in italics indicate fastest lap)

Year	Team	Class	Make	Engine	1	2	3	4	5	6	7	Rank	Points
2024	TDS Racing	LMP2	Oreca 07	Gibson GK428 4.2 L V8	DAY; 13	SEB; 2	WGL; 9	MOS	ELK	IMS; 1	PET; 1	18th	1563
2025	TDS Racing	LMP2	Oreca 07	Gibson GK428 4.2 L V8	DAY; 8	**SEB**; 3	WGL; 11	MOS; 8	ELK	IMS; 1	PET; 1	9th	1828
2026	United Autosports USA	LMP2	Oreca 07	Gibson GK428 4.2 L V8	DAY; 10	SEB; 1	WGL; 9	MOS	ELK; 9	IMS	PET; 9	21st	1336

Sporting positions
Preceded by Ben Hanley; George Kurtz	Michelin Endurance Cup; LMP2 Champion; 2024-2025; With: Mikkel Jensen & Steven Thomas	Succeeded by Toby Sowery; George Kurtz; Alex Quinn
