= 2018 U.S. F2000 National Championship =

Car racing competition

The 2018 Cooper Tires USF2000 Championship Powered by Mazda was the ninth season – since its revival in 2010 – of the U.S. F2000 National Championship, an open wheel auto racing series that is the first step in INDYCAR's Road to Indy ladder, operated by Andersen Promotions.

American Kyle Kirkwood driving for Cape Motorsports in a single-car effort dominated the championship, winning twelve of the fourteen races. The only other driver to win was two consecutive races won by former Indy Lights competitor Alexandre Baron for Swan-RJB Motorsports early in the season. Baron left the series after seven races. Swede Rasmus Lindh finished well back in second place driving for Pabst Racing who won the team championship in a close battle. Lindh didn't capture a second place finish until the final race of the season. Just behind Lindh were Brazilians Lucas Kohl and Igor Fraga. Fourteen drivers competed in all fourteen races.

== Drivers and teams ==
Team	No.	Driver(s)	Status	Round(s)
Abel Motorsports	79	(United States) Jacob Abel	R	6–7, 10–12
ArmsUp Motorsports	9	(United States) Dakota Dickerson		6–14
ArmsUp Motorsports	14	(United States) Max Peichel	R	3–4, 6–9, 13–14
ArmsUp Motorsports	30	(Republic of Ireland) Keith Donegan	R	1–5
BN Racing	28	(United Kingdom) Jamie Caroline	R	1–4
BN Racing	28	(Republic of Ireland) Keith Donegan	R	6–12
BN Racing	29	(United States) Russell McDonough	R	All
Cape Motorsports	8	(United States) Kyle Kirkwood	R	All
DEForce Racing	7	(United Kingdom) James Raven	R	10–12
DEForce Racing	10	(United States) Zach Holden	R	1–5
DEForce Racing	11	(United States) Kory Enders		All
DEForce Racing	12	(Mexico) José Sierra	R	All
DEForce Racing	27	(United States) Colin Kaminsky		All
Exclusive Autosport	90	(Mexico) Manuel Cabrera	R	1–7
Exclusive Autosport	90	(United States) Yuven Sundaramoorthy	R	10–12
Exclusive Autosport	90	(Canada) Kellen Ritter	R	13–14
Exclusive Autosport	91	(Brazil) Igor Fraga	R	All
Exclusive Autosport	92	(Singapore) Danial Frost	R	6–12
Exclusive Autosport	93	(Canada) Jayson Clunie		1–2
Newman Wachs Racing	36	(United States) Darren Keane		1–12
Newman Wachs Racing	37	(United States) David Osborne	R	1–7, 10–12
Newman Wachs Racing	38	(United Kingdom) Oscar DeLuzuriaga	R	All
Newman Wachs Racing	41	(United States) Braden Eves	R	13–14
Pabst Racing Services	21	(Guyana) Calvin Ming		All
Pabst Racing Services	22	(Brazil) Lucas Kohl		All
Pabst Racing Services	23	(Sweden) Rasmus Lindh	R	All
Pabst Racing Services	24	(United States) Kaylen Frederick		All
Sol.O Racing	5	(Colombia) Mathias Soler-Obel	R	1–7
Swan-RJB Motorsports	19	(France) Alexandre Baron		1–7
Swan-RJB Motorsports	20	(Republic of Ireland) James Roe	R	3–4
Team Benik	31	(United States) Sabré Cook	R	1–4, 6–7, 10–12
Team Benik	51	(United States) Michael d'Orlando	R	1–4, 6–7, 10–12
Team Pelfrey	80	(South Africa) Julian van der Watt	R	All
Team Pelfrey	81	(United States) Kyle Dupell	R	All
Team Pelfrey	82	(Brazil) Bruna Tomaselli		All

Icon	Class
R	Rookie

== Schedule ==
A 14-race schedule was announced on October 17, 2017.

Icon	Legend
O	Oval/Speedway
R	Road course
S	Street circuit

Rd.	Date	Race name	Track	Location
1	March 10–11	Cooper Tires USF2000 Grand Prix of St. Petersburg	S Streets of St. Petersburg	St. Petersburg, Florida
2	March 10–11	Cooper Tires USF2000 Grand Prix of St. Petersburg	S Streets of St. Petersburg	St. Petersburg, Florida
3	May 11–12	USF2000 Royal Purple Grand Prix of Indianapolis	R Indianapolis Motor Speedway Road Course	Speedway, Indiana
4	May 11–12	USF2000 Royal Purple Grand Prix of Indianapolis	R Indianapolis Motor Speedway Road Course	Speedway, Indiana
5	May 25	Cooper Tires Freedom 75	O Lucas Oil Raceway	Clermont, Indiana
6	June 23–24	Cooper Tires Grand Prix of Road America	R Road America	Elkhart Lake, Wisconsin
7	June 23–24	Cooper Tires Grand Prix of Road America	R Road America	Elkhart Lake, Wisconsin
8	July 14–15	Cooper Tires USF2000 Grand Prix of Toronto	S Exhibition Place	Toronto, Ontario
9	July 14–15	Cooper Tires USF2000 Grand Prix of Toronto	S Exhibition Place	Toronto, Ontario
10	July 27–29	Cooper Tires USF2000 Mid-Ohio Grand Prix	R Mid-Ohio Sports Car Course	Lexington, Ohio
11	July 27–29	Cooper Tires USF2000 Mid-Ohio Grand Prix	R Mid-Ohio Sports Car Course	Lexington, Ohio
12	July 27–29	Cooper Tires USF2000 Mid-Ohio Grand Prix	R Mid-Ohio Sports Car Course	Lexington, Ohio
13	September 1–2	Cooper Tires USF2000 Grand Prix of Portland	R Portland International Raceway	Portland, Oregon
14	September 1–2	Cooper Tires USF2000 Grand Prix of Portland	R Portland International Raceway	Portland, Oregon

== Race results ==
Rd.	Track	Pole position	Fastest lap	Most laps led	Race winner	
Rd.	Track	Pole position	Fastest lap	Most laps led	Driver	Team
1	Streets of St. Petersburg	(Mexico) José Sierra	(France) Alexandre Baron	(United States) Kyle Kirkwood	(United States) Kyle Kirkwood	Cape Motorsports
2	Streets of St. Petersburg	(France) Alexandre Baron	(France) Alexandre Baron	(France) Alexandre Baron	(France) Alexandre Baron	Swan-RJB Motorsports
3	Indianapolis Motor Speedway Road Course	(United States) Kyle Kirkwood	(France) Alexandre Baron	(France) Alexandre Baron	(France) Alexandre Baron	Swan-RJB Motorsports
4	Indianapolis Motor Speedway Road Course	(United States) Kyle Kirkwood	(France) Alexandre Baron	(United States) Kyle Kirkwood	(United States) Kyle Kirkwood	Cape Motorsports
5	Lucas Oil Raceway	(United States) Kyle Kirkwood	(United States) Kyle Kirkwood	(United States) Kyle Kirkwood	(United States) Kyle Kirkwood	Cape Motorsports
6	Road America	(Sweden) Rasmus Lindh	(United States) Kyle Kirkwood	(United States) Kyle Kirkwood	(United States) Kyle Kirkwood	Cape Motorsports
7	Road America	(Sweden) Rasmus Lindh	(United States) Kyle Kirkwood	(Brazil) Lucas Kohl	(United States) Kyle Kirkwood	Cape Motorsports
8	Streets of Toronto	(United States) Dakota Dickerson	(Sweden) Rasmus Lindh	(United States) Kyle Kirkwood	(United States) Kyle Kirkwood	Cape Motorsports
9	Streets of Toronto	(United States) Kaylen Frederick	(Sweden) Rasmus Lindh	(United States) Kyle Kirkwood	(United States) Kyle Kirkwood	Cape Motorsports
10	Mid-Ohio Sports Car Course	(United States) Kyle Kirkwood	(Sweden) Rasmus Lindh	(United States) Kyle Kirkwood	(United States) Kyle Kirkwood	Cape Motorsports
11	Mid-Ohio Sports Car Course	(United States) Kaylen Frederick	(United Kingdom) James Raven	(United States) Kyle Kirkwood	(United States) Kyle Kirkwood	Cape Motorsports
12	Mid-Ohio Sports Car Course	(United Kingdom) James Raven	(United States) Kyle Kirkwood	(United States) Kyle Kirkwood	(United States) Kyle Kirkwood	Cape Motorsports
13	Portland International Raceway	(United States) Kyle Kirkwood	(United States) Kyle Kirkwood	(United States) Kyle Kirkwood	(United States) Kyle Kirkwood	Cape Motorsports
14	Portland International Raceway	(Sweden) Rasmus Lindh	(United States) Kyle Kirkwood	(United States) Kyle Kirkwood	(United States) Kyle Kirkwood	Cape Motorsports

== Championship standings ==
Scoring system

Position	**1st**	**2nd**	**3rd**	**4th**	**5th**	**6th**	**7th**	**8th**	**9th**	**10th**	**11th**	**12th**	**13th**	**14th**	**15th**	**16th**	**17th**	**18th**	**19th**	**20th+**
Points (R)	30	25	22	19	17	15	14	13	12	11	10	9	8	7	6	5	4	3	2	1
Points (O)	45	38	33	29	26	23	21	20	18	17	15	14	12	11	9	8	6	5	4	2

- One point is awarded to the driver who qualifies on pole position.
- One point is awarded to the driver who leads the most laps in the race.
- One point is awarded to the driver who sets the fastest lap during the race.

=== Drivers' Championship ===
Pos	Driver	STP		IMS		LOR	ROA		TOR		MOH			POR		Points
1	(United States) Kyle Kirkwood	1*	5	**2**	**1***	**1***	1*	1	1*	1*	**1***	1*	1*	**1***	1*	440
2	(Sweden) Rasmus Lindh	10	24	14	3	3	**4**	**18**	4	3	10	4	3	4	**2**	238
3	(Brazil) Lucas Kohl	13	3	26	7	4	23	3*	9	15	2	2	6	5	5	215
4	(Brazil) Igor Fraga	8	2	8	17	7	8	5	7	2	17	3	5	15	4	213
5	(Guyana) Calvin Ming	4	8	6	19	9	6	15	6	11	3	5	7	2	6	206
6	(United States) Kaylen Frederick	11	9	22	21	2	2	2	3	**8**	24	**23**	19	7	15	173
7	(South Africa) Julian van der Watt	5	11	7	8	19	24	17	10	5	5	8	14	9	3	162
8	(United States) Kory Enders	19	10	5	6	11	5	19	16	14	9	16	24	3	9	143
9	(Republic of Ireland) Keith Donegan	14	13	24	11	6	3	13	5	17	4	21	4			139
10	(United States) Colin Kaminsky	6	22	9	16	13	12	4	12	18	12	7	12	17	8	134
11	(Mexico) José Sierra	**2**	6	3	26	5	9	23	18	7	19	19	22	12	17	128
12	(France) Alexandre Baron	22	**1***	1*	2	21	7	7								123
13	(United States) Dakota Dickerson						14	9	**2**	6	6	6	18	8	7	120
14	(United States) Darren Keane	3	12	23	4	8	10	20	17	12	21	17	17			105
15	(United States) Kyle Dupell	9	15	16	23	17	13	21	15	9	15	14	13	10	10	100
16	(Brazil) Bruna Tomaselli	7	14	19	22	14	17	11	13	13	20	13	16	18	16	87
17	(Singapore) Danial Frost						19	16	8	4	7	9	9			77
18	(United Kingdom) Oscar DeLuzuriaga	20	19	20	13	16	21	12	11	10	22	24	21	13	14	69
19	(United States) Russell McDonough	23	25	18	12	20	16	26	14	16	23	12	23	16	11	60
20	(United States) Michael d'Orlando	16	23	25	15		22	6			8	20	8			56
21	(Colombia) Mathias Soler-Obel	12	16	13	18	12	11	14								56
22	(Mexico) Manuel Cabrera	25	21	11	9	10	26	8								55
23	(United States) Jacob Abel						15	10			11	11	11			47
24	(United States) David Osborne	18	18	15	20	15	18	22			13	15	15			46
25	(United Kingdom) Jamie Caroline	24	4	4	24											40
26	(United States) Max Peichel			17	10		20	24	DNS	DNS				14	12	35
27	(United Kingdom) James Raven										18	18	**2**			33
28	(United States) Zach Holden	21	7	10	25	18										32
29	(United States) Yuven Sundaramoorthy										14	10	10			29
30	(United States) Sabré Cook	15	17	21	14		25	25			16	22	20			27
31	(Republic of Ireland) James Roe			12	5											26
32	(United States) Braden Eves													6	18	18
33	(Canada) Kellen Ritter													11	13	18
34	(Canada) Jayson Clunie	17	20													5
Pos	Driver	STP		IMS		LOR	ROA		TOR		MOH			POR		Points

Color	Result
Gold	Winner
Silver	2nd place
Bronze	3rd place
Green	4th & 5th place
Light Blue	6th–10th place
Dark Blue	Finished (Outside Top 10)
Purple	Did not finish (DNF)
Red	Did not qualify (DNQ)
Brown	Withdrawn (Wth)
Black	Disqualified (DSQ)
White	Did not start (DNS)
Blank	Did not participate

**In-line notation**
**Bold**	Pole position (1 point)
Italics	Ran fastest race lap (1 point)
*	Led most race laps (1 point); Not awarded if more than one driver leads most laps
Rookie

=== Teams' championship ===
Scoring system

Position	**1st**	**2nd**	**3rd**	**4th**	**5th**	**6th**	**7th**	**8th**	**9th**	**10th+**
Points	22	18	15	12	10	8	6	4	2	1

- Single car teams receive 3 bonus points as an equivalency to multi-car teams
- Only the best two results count for teams fielding more than two entries

Pos	Team	Points
1	Pabst Racing	349
2	Cape Motorsports	334
3	DEForce Racing	181
4	Exclusive Autosport	166
5	Swan-RJB Motorsports	104
6	ArmsUp Motorsports	102
7	BN Racing	101
8	Team Pelfrey	101
9	Newman Wachs Racing	69
10	Team BENIK	33
11	Sol.O Racing	28
12	Abel Motorsports	22

== See also ==
2018 IndyCar Series
2018 Indy Lights
2018 Pro Mazda Championship

== See also ==
- 2018 IndyCar Series
- 2018 Indy Lights
- 2018 Pro Mazda Championship
