= Rasmus Lindh =

Swedish racing driver (born 2001)

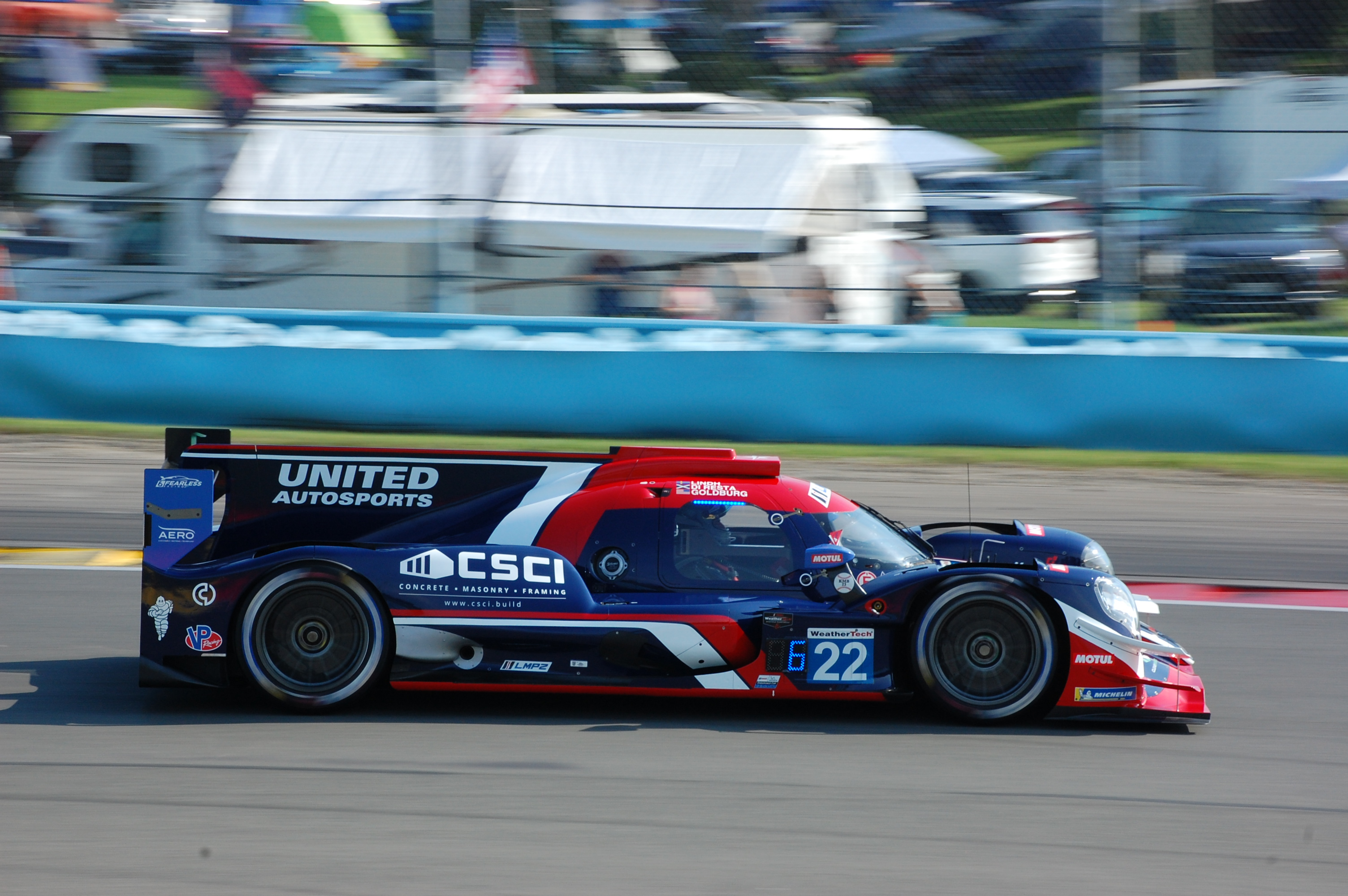
- Lindh at Watkins Glen in 2025
- Nationality: (Sweden) Swedish
- Born: Rasmus Mathias Lindh; 6 July 2001 (age 25) Gothenburg, Sweden

IMSA SportsCar Championship career
- Debut season: 2021
- Current team: United Autosports USA/DragonSpeed
- Categorisation: FIA Silver
- Car number: 22/81
- Former teams: JDC–Miller MotorSports, Andretti Autosport, Performance Tech Motorsports
- Starts: 28 (28 entries)
- Wins: 2
- Podiums: 5
- Poles: 5
- Fastest laps: 2
- Best finish: 5th in 2021

Previous series
- 2024 2021, 2023 2019 2018: European Le Mans Series; Indy NXT; Indy Pro 2000 Championship; U.S. F2000 National Championship

Rasmus Mathias Lindh (born 6 July 2001) is a Swedish racing driver who currently competes in the IMSA SportsCar Championship driving for United Autosports in LMP2. He competed in Indy NXT in 2023 for Juncos Hollinger Racing in the No. 76 car, after switching from HMD Motorsports with Dale Coyne Racing. Lindh previously competed in the then Indy Lights for Juncos.

== Career ==
=== Karting ===
Born in Gothenburg, Lindh began his career in karting at the age of six before going professional in 2009, collecting numerous titles in his native Sweden as well as partaking in the CIK-FIA European championships with the likes of Birel ART and Ricciardo Kart Racing.

=== Road to Indy ===
==== USF2000 ====
In October 2017, Lindh partook in the USF2000 category of the Chris Griffis Memorial Test with Team BENIK. Three months later, it was confirmed Lindh would make his single-seater debut in the 2018 season with Pabst Racing Services. Despite coming away without a win, Lindh achieved three pole positions and five podiums to finish as vice-champion to Kyle Kirkwood.

==== Pro Mazda/Indy Pro 2000 ====
In September 2018, Lindh partook in the Pro Mazda category of the Chris Griffis Memorial Test with Juncos Racing. In February 2019, it was announced Lindh would race with Juncos in the newly re-branded Indy Pro 2000 Championship. In the first race at the Indianapolis GP, Lindh claimed his maiden single-seater win after starting from pole position. He achieved one final victory in the second race at Laguna Seca and once again finished as championship runner-up to Kirkwood.

==== Indy Lights ====
In October 2019, Lindh was named as one of Andretti Autosport's entrants in the Chris Griffis Memorial test. Two months later, Lindh joined HMD Motorsports for the second test at Sebring, setting the fastest time of the test. In March 2020, it was announced Lindh would partake in the Spring Training session at Homestead with Belardi Auto Racing who subsequently named him as their first driver signing for the 2020 season, which would subsequently be cancelled due to the COVID-19 pandemic. On 8 September 2021, it was reported on the RACER web site that Lindh had rejoined Juncos Hollinger Racing for rest of the 2021 Indy Lights season.

Lindh would return to Indy Lights, rebranded as Indy NXT, in 2023 with a full-time seat at HMD Motorsports in the No. 10 car sponsored by GarageXYZ.

== Racing record ==
=== Career summary ===
Season	Series	Team	Races	Wins	Poles	F/Laps	Podiums	Points	Position
2018	U.S. F2000 National Championship	Pabst Racing Services	14	0	3	3	5	238	**2nd**
2019	Indy Pro 2000 Championship	Juncos Racing	16	3	5	4	13	417	**2nd**
2019	Porsche Carrera Cup Scandinavia	Mtech Competition	2	0	0	1	0	0	NC†
2020	IMSA Prototype Challenge	Performance Tech Motorsports	5	0	0	1	2	132	12th
2020	Indy Pro 2000 Championship	Turn 3 Motorsport	2	0	0	0	0	34	20th
2020	Porsche Carrera Cup Scandinavia	Fragus Motorsport	2	0	0	0	0	0	NC†
2021	IMSA SportsCar Championship - LMP3	Performance Tech Motorsports	7	0	2	0	2	1790	5th
2021	IMSA Prototype Challenge - LMP3-1	Performance Tech Motorsports	6	1	0	0	3	1540	4th
2021	Indy Lights	Juncos Racing	6	0	0	0	0	81	14th
2022	IMSA SportsCar Championship - LMP3	Andretti Autosport	1	0	1	0	0	922	16th
2022	IMSA SportsCar Championship - LMP3	Performance Tech Motorsports	3	0	0	1	2	922	16th
2023	Indy NXT	HMD Motorsports with Dale Coyne Racing	1	0	0	0	0	210	14th
2023	Indy NXT	Juncos Hollinger Racing	9	0	0	0	1	210	14th
2023	IMSA SportsCar Championship - LMP3	Andretti Autosport	1	0	0	0	0	532	21st
2023	IMSA SportsCar Championship - LMP3	JDC-Miller MotorSports	2	0	0	0	0	532	21st
2024	IMSA SportsCar Championship - LMP2	DragonSpeed	2	0	0	1	0	492	35th
2024	IMSA SportsCar Championship - GTD	DragonSpeed	1	0	0	0	0	190	67th
2024	European Le Mans Series - LMP2	Duqueine Team	1	0	0	0	0	0	26th
2025	IMSA SportsCar Championship - LMP2	United Autosports USA	5	2	1	0	2	1565	17th
2025	IMSA SportsCar Championship - GTD Pro	DragonSpeed	1	0	0	0	0	251	34th
2026	IMSA SportsCar Championship - LMP2	United Autosports USA	5	0	1	0	1	1505	17th
2026	24 Hours of Le Mans - LMP2	United Autosports	1	0	0	0	0	N/A	8th

=== American open-wheel racing results ===
(key)

==== U.S. F2000 National Championship ====
Year	Team	1	2	3	4	5	6	7	8	9	10	11	12	13	14	Rank	Points
2018	Pabst Racing Services	STP; 10	STP; 24	IMS; 14	IMS; 3	LOR; 3	**ROA**; 4	**ROA**; 18	TOR; 4	TOR; 3	MOH; 10	MOH; 4	MOH; 3	POR; 4	**POR**; 2	2nd	238

==== Indy Pro 2000 Championship ====
Year	Team	1	2	3	4	5	6	7	8	9	10	11	12	13	14	15	16	17	Rank	Points
2019	Juncos Racing	STP; 2	STP; 4	**IMS**; 1	**IMS**; 1	LOR; 3	ROA; 4	**ROA**; 2	TOR; 2	TOR; 3	MOH; 2	MOH; 3	**GTW**; 2	PIR; 5	PIR; 3	LAG; 3	**LAG**; 1		2nd	417
2020	Turn 3 Motorsport	ROA	ROA	MOH	MOH	MOH	LOR	GMP	IMS	IMS	IMS	MOH	MOH	NJM	NJM	NJM	STP; 6	STP; 4	20th	34

==== Indy NXT ====
Year	Team	1	2	3	4	5	6	7	8	9	10	11	12	13	14	15	16	17	18	19	20	Rank	Points
2021	Juncos Racing	ALA	ALA	STP	STP	IMS	IMS	DET	DET	RDA	RDA	MOH	MOH	GTW	GTW	POR; 7	POR; 9	LAG; 5	LAG; 7	MOH; 10	MOH; 8	14th	81
2023	HMD Motorsports with Dale Coyne Racing	STP; 9	BAR																			14th	210
2023	Juncos Hollinger Racing			IMS; 8	DET; 12	DET; 14	RDA; 18	MOH; 7	IOW; 3	NSH; 7	IMS; 15	GMP; 14	POR	LAG	LAG							14th	210

=== Complete IMSA SportsCar Championship results ===
(key) (Races in bold indicate pole position; races in italics indicate fastest lap)

Year	Entrant	Class	Make	Engine	1	2	3	4	5	6	7	8	9	10	Rank	Points
2021	Performance Tech Motorsports	LMP3	Ligier JS P320	Nissan VK56DE 5.6 L V8	DAY; 6†	**SEB**; 7	MOH; 2	WGL; 7	WGL; 5	**ELK**; 2	PET; 9				5th	1790
2022	Andretti Autosport	LMP3	Ligier JS P320	Nissan VK56DE 5.6 L V8	**DAY**; 4†										16th	922
2022	Performance Tech Motorsports	LMP3	Ligier JS P320	Nissan VK56DE 5.6 L V8		SEB; 3	MOH; 7	WGL; 3	MOS	ELK	PET				16th	922
2023	Andretti Autosport	LMP3	Ligier JS P320	Nissan VK56DE 5.6 L V8	DAY; 7	SEB									21st	532
2023	JDC-Miller MotorSports	LMP3	Duqueine M30 - D08	Nissan VK56DE 5.6 L V8			WGL; 9	MOS	ELK	IMS	PET; 4				21st	532
2024	DragonSpeed USA	LMP2	Oreca 07	Gibson GK428 4.2 L V8	DAY	SEB; 7			WGL; 10	MOS	ELK				35th	492
2024	DragonSpeed USA	GTD	Ferrari 296 GT3	Ferrari F163CE 3.0 L Turbo V6			LBH	LGA				VIR	IMS; 13	PET	67th	190
2025	United Autosports USA	LMP2	Oreca 07	Gibson GK428 4.2 L V8	**DAY**; 1	SEB; 8			WGL; 1	MOS	ELK		IMS; 4	PET; 11	17th	1565
2025	DragonSpeed	GTD Pro	Ferrari 296 GT3	Ferrari F163CE 3.0 L Turbo V6			LGA	DET; 8				VIR			34th	251
2026	United Autosports USA	LMP2	Oreca 07	Gibson GK428 4.2 L V8	DAY; 4	SEB; 2	WGL; 5	MOS	**ELK**; 7	IMS	PET; 6				17th	1505

^{†} Points only counted towards the Michelin Endurance Cup, and not the overall LMP3 Championship.

=== Complete European Le Mans Series results ===
Year	Entrant	Class	Chassis	Engine	1	2	3	4	5	6	Rank	Points
2024	Duqueine Team	LMP2	Oreca 07	Gibson GK428 4.2 L V8	CAT	LEC	IMO	SPA; 12	MUG	ALG	26th	0

=== Complete 24 Hours of Le Mans results ===
Year	Team	Co-Drivers	Car	Class	Laps	Pos.	Class Pos.
2026	(United Kingdom) United Autosports	(Denmark) Mikkel Jensen (Switzerland) Grégoire Saucy	Oreca 07-Gibson	LMP2	358	22nd	8th
