= 2020 Indy Pro 2000 Championship =

The 2020 Indy Pro 2000 Championship was the 22nd season in series history. An 18-round schedule was announced on 12 September 2019, featuring six permanent road courses, two street circuits, and two ovals. Except for the two Indianapolis-area rounds, they were NTT IndyCar Series support races. The Indianapolis road course race was a stand-alone race because the NASCAR Cup Series Big Machine 400 weekend was combined with the GMR Grand Prix weekend as a double header so that weekend is full, and the Lucas Oil Raceway round, normally held on Indianapolis 500 weekend, is part of the USAC Silver Crown Series Dave Steele Classic round.

RP Motorsport USA withdrew from the series this season because of travel restrictions due to the 2019-20 coronavirus pandemic.

American Sting Ray Robb, driving for Juncos Racing, clinched the championship with two races remaining on the season.

== Drivers and teams ==
Competitors entered for the March round at St. Petersburg took part in a practice session prior to the cancellation, and are marked with a C.

Team	No.	Drivers	Rounds
Abel Motorsports	51	(United States) Jacob Abel	6–7, 11–15
Andretti Steinbrenner Autosport	17	(Canada) Devlin DeFrancesco	All
DEForce Racing	6	(Mexico) Moisés de la Vara	C, 1–12, 16–17
DEForce Racing	7	(United States) Kory Enders	C, 3–17
DEForce Racing	8	(Mexico) Manuel Sulaimán	C, All
DEForce Racing	9	(Canada) Parker Thompson	C, All
Exclusive Autosport	1	(United States) Braden Eves	C, 1–10
Exclusive Autosport	90	(France) Tristan Charpentier	16–17
FatBoy Racing!	83	(United States) Charles Finelli	C, 1–7, 11–17
Juncos Racing	2	(United States) Sting Ray Robb	C, All
Juncos Racing	42	(Russia) Artem Petrov	C, All
Juncos Racing	69	(United States) Nate Aranda	1–6, 8–10, 16–17
Legacy Autosport	20	(United States) Kody Swanson	6–7
Pabst Racing	18	(New Zealand) Hunter McElrea	C, All
Pabst Racing	19	(United States) Colin Kaminsky	C, All
Pabst Racing	57	(United States) Bob Kaminsky	1–5, 8–12
RP Motorsport USA	4	(Sweden) Lucas Petersson	C
RP Motorsport USA	5	(United States) Phillippe Denes	C
BN Racing w/ Team Benik	36	(United States) Jacob Loomis	1–5, 8–10
BN Racing w/ Team Benik	37	(United States) Sabré Cook	C, 1–5
Turn 3 Motorsport	3	(Brazil) Lucas Kohl	C
Turn 3 Motorsport	3	(Canada) Antoine Comeau	1–15
Turn 3 Motorsport	3	(Sweden) Rasmus Lindh	16–17
Turn 3 Motorsport	68	(Singapore) Danial Frost	All

== Schedule ==
Rd.	Date	Race name	Track	Location
1	July 9–10	Indy Pro 2000 Grand Prix of Road America; Presented by Cooper Tires Honoring First Responders	R Road America	Elkhart Lake, Wisconsin
2	July 9–10	Indy Pro 2000 Grand Prix of Road America; Presented by Cooper Tires Honoring First Responders	R Road America	Elkhart Lake, Wisconsin
3	July 29–30	Indy Pro 2000 Grand Prix of Mid-Ohio; Presented by Cooper Tires Honoring First Responders	R Mid-Ohio Sports Car Course	Lexington, Ohio
4	July 29–30	Indy Pro 2000 Grand Prix of Mid-Ohio; Presented by Cooper Tires Honoring First Responders	R Mid-Ohio Sports Car Course	Lexington, Ohio
5	July 29–30	Indy Pro 2000 Grand Prix of Mid-Ohio; Presented by Cooper Tires Honoring First Responders	R Mid-Ohio Sports Car Course	Lexington, Ohio
6	August 22	Cooper Tires Freedom 90	O Lucas Oil Raceway	Brownsburg, Indiana
7	August 29	Indy Pro 2000 Oval Challenge of St. Louis; Presented by Cooper Tires	O World Wide Technology Raceway	Madison, Illinois
8	September 3–4	Cooper Tires Indy Pro 2000 Indy Grand Prix	R Indianapolis Motor Speedway Road Course	Speedway, Indiana
9	September 3–4	Cooper Tires Indy Pro 2000 Indy Grand Prix	R Indianapolis Motor Speedway Road Course	Speedway, Indiana
10	September 3–4	Cooper Tires Indy Pro 2000 Indy Grand Prix	R Indianapolis Motor Speedway Road Course	Speedway, Indiana
11	September 11–13	Surgere Indy Pro 2000 Grand Prix of Mid-Ohio	R Mid-Ohio Sports Car Course	Lexington, Ohio
12	September 11–13	Surgere Indy Pro 2000 Grand Prix of Mid-Ohio	R Mid-Ohio Sports Car Course	Lexington, Ohio
13	October 9–11	Cooper Tires Indy Pro 2000 Grand Prix at New Jersey Motorsports Park	R New Jersey Motorsports Park	Millville, New Jersey
14	October 9–11	Cooper Tires Indy Pro 2000 Grand Prix at New Jersey Motorsports Park	R New Jersey Motorsports Park	Millville, New Jersey
15	October 9–11	Cooper Tires Indy Pro 2000 Grand Prix at New Jersey Motorsports Park	R New Jersey Motorsports Park	Millville, New Jersey
16	October 23–25	Indy Pro 2000 Grand Prix of St. Petersburg; Presented by Cooper Tires	R Streets of St. Petersburg	St. Petersburg, Florida
17	October 23–25	Indy Pro 2000 Grand Prix of St. Petersburg; Presented by Allied Building Products	R Streets of St. Petersburg	St. Petersburg, Florida

Cancelled events
Date	Race name	Track	City
April 25–26	Never announced	R Circuit of the Americas	Austin, Texas
July 10–12	Never announced	R Exhibition Place	Toronto, Ontario, Canada
September 11–13	Never announced	R Portland International Raceway	Portland, Oregon
September 18–20	Never announced	R WeatherTech Raceway Laguna Seca	Monterey, California

== Race results ==
Round	Race	Pole position	Fastest lap	Most laps led	Race Winner	
Round	Race	Pole position	Fastest lap	Most laps led	Driver	Team
1	Road America 1	(Canada) Devlin DeFrancesco	(Mexico) Manuel Sulaimán	(Canada) Devlin DeFrancesco	(Singapore) Danial Frost	Turn 3 Motorsport
2	Road America 2	(Mexico) Manuel Sulaimán	(United States) Braden Eves	(Russia) Artem Petrov	(Russia) Artem Petrov	Juncos Racing
3	Mid-Ohio 1	(United States) Braden Eves	(New Zealand) Hunter McElrea	(United States) Braden Eves	(United States) Braden Eves	Exclusive Autosport
4	Mid-Ohio 2	(United States) Braden Eves	(United States) Jacob Loomis	(Russia) Artem Petrov	(Russia) Artem Petrov	Juncos Racing
5	Mid-Ohio 3	(United States) Jacob Loomis	(Singapore) Danial Frost	(United States) Sting Ray Robb	(United States) Sting Ray Robb	Juncos Racing
6	Freedom 90	(Mexico) Manuel Sulaimán	(Mexico) Manuel Sulaimán	(United States) Kody Swanson	(United States) Kody Swanson	Legacy Autosport
7	Gateway	(Canada) Devlin DeFrancesco	(United States) Braden Eves	(Canada) Devlin DeFrancesco	(Canada) Devlin DeFrancesco	Andretti Steinbrenner Autosport
8	Indianapolis GP 1	(Russia) Artem Petrov	(United States) Sting Ray Robb	(United States) Sting Ray Robb	(United States) Sting Ray Robb	Juncos Racing
9	Indianapolis GP 2	(United States) Sting Ray Robb	(United States) Sting Ray Robb	(United States) Sting Ray Robb	(United States) Sting Ray Robb	Juncos Racing
10	Indianapolis GP 3	(United States) Sting Ray Robb	(United States) Sting Ray Robb	(United States) Sting Ray Robb	(United States) Sting Ray Robb	Juncos Racing
11	Mid-Ohio 4	(Singapore) Danial Frost	(New Zealand) Hunter McElrea	(Mexico) Manuel Sulaimán	(Mexico) Manuel Sulaimán	DEForce Racing
12	Mid-Ohio 5	(Mexico) Manuel Sulaimán	(Mexico) Manuel Sulaimán	(United States) Sting Ray Robb	(United States) Sting Ray Robb	Juncos Racing
13	New Jersey 1	(Canada) Devlin DeFrancesco	(Canada) Devlin DeFrancesco	(Canada) Devlin DeFrancesco	(Canada) Devlin DeFrancesco	Andretti Steinbrenner Autosport
14	New Jersey 2	(United States) Sting Ray Robb	(United States) Colin Kaminsky	(United States) Sting Ray Robb	(United States) Sting Ray Robb	Juncos Racing
15	New Jersey 3	(United States) Colin Kaminsky	(Mexico) Manuel Sulaimán	(Mexico) Manuel Sulaimán	(Mexico) Manuel Sulaimán	DEForce Racing
16	St. Petersburg 1	(United States) Sting Ray Robb	(United States) Sting Ray Robb	(United States) Sting Ray Robb	(United States) Sting Ray Robb	Juncos Racing
17	St. Petersburg 2	(United States) Sting Ray Robb	(United States) Sting Ray Robb	(New Zealand) Hunter McElrea	(New Zealand) Hunter McElrea	Pabst Racing

== Championship standings ==
=== Drivers' Championship ===
Scoring system

Position	**1st**	**2nd**	**3rd**	**4th**	**5th**	**6th**	**7th**	**8th**	**9th**	**10th**	**11th**	**12th**	**13th**	**14th**	**15th**	**16th**	**17th**	**18th**	**19th**	**20th**
Points	30	25	22	19	17	15	14	13	12	11	10	9	8	7	6	5	4	3	2	1
Points (O)	45	38	33	29	26	23	21	20	18	17	15	14	12	11	9	8	6	5	4	2

- The driver who qualifies on pole is awarded one additional point.
- One point is awarded to the driver who leads the most laps in a race.
- One point is awarded to the driver who sets the fastest lap during the race.

Pos	Driver	ROA		MOH			LOR	GMP	IMS			MOH		NJMP			STP		Points
1	(United States) Sting Ray Robb	5	2	10	3	1*	6	4	1*	**1***	**1***	4	1*	2	**1***	3	**1***	**5**	437
2	(Canada) Devlin DeFrancesco	**2***	4	7	2	3	4	**1***	4	2	8	14	11	**1***	10	10	7	6	341
3	(Singapore) Danial Frost	1	3	2	8	11	5	5	5	5	9	**2**	5	12	5	7	2	3	329
4	(Russia) Artem Petrov	13	1*	5	1*	8	9	3	**10**	3	3	5	4	5	3	11	3	9	326
5	(New Zealand) Hunter McElrea	15	15	8	6	2	2	11	2	6	2	3	9	6	4	5	4	1*	320
6	(Mexico) Manuel Sulaimán	16	**11**	4	5	6	**3**	7	DNS	14	4	1*	**7**	3	11	1*	5	10	289
7	(Canada) Parker Thompson	14	16	3	4	4	10	6	3	4	5	13	2	4	2	4	13	12	283
8	(United States) Colin Kaminsky	3	6	6	15	16	8	13	6	11	10	6	6	7	8	**2**	9	2	252
9	(Canada) Antoine Comeau	8	7	15	11	7	13	8	7	12	14	9	10	8	7	9			181
10	(United States) Kory Enders			17	17	5	14	9	8	13	11	8	14	10	9	6	14	7	164
11	(United States) Braden Eves	4	5	**1***	**9**	9	7	2	12	DNS	DNS								163
12	(Mexico) Moisés de la Vara	7	8	16	7	12	11	15	11	7	6	10	8				8	13	163
13	(United States) Nate Aranda	9	9	12	10	13	DNS		9	9	12						10	8	109
14	(United States) Jacob Abel						12	10				7	3	9	6	8			107
15	(United States) Charles Finelli	12	13	14	14	14	DNS	14				12	13	11	DNS	DNS	12	14	92
16	(United States) Bob Kaminsky	11	12	13	13	10			14	10	13	11	12						91
17	(United States) Jacob Loomis	6	14	9	16	**DSQ**			13	8	7								76
18	(United States) Kody Swanson						1*	12											60
19	(United States) Sabré Cook	10	10	11	12	15													47
20	(Sweden) Rasmus Lindh																6	4	34
21	(France) Tristan Charpentier																11	11	20

Color	Result
Gold	Winner
Silver	2nd place
Bronze	3rd place
Green	4th & 5th place
Light Blue	6th–10th place
Dark Blue	Finished (Outside Top 10)
Purple	Did not finish
Red	Did not qualify (DNQ)
Brown	Withdrawn (Wth)
Black	Disqualified (DSQ)
White	Did not start (DNS)
Blank	Did not participate

**In-line notation**
**Bold**	Pole position (1 point)
Italics	Ran fastest race lap (1 point)
*	Led most race laps (1 point); Not awarded if more than one driver leads most laps
Rookie

== See also ==
- 2020 IndyCar Series
- 2020 Indy Lights (canceled)
- 2020 U.S. F2000 National Championship
