= Abel Motorsports =

American auto racing team

(United States) Abel Motorsports
- Founded: 1972; 54 years ago
- Founder(s): Bill Abel
- Base: Indianapolis, Indiana
- Team principal(s): Bill Abel; John Brunner
- Current series: IndyCar Series; Indy NXT
- Former series: U.S. F2000 National Championship; Formula 4 United States Championship; Formula Regional Americas Championship; Indy Pro 2000 Championship
- Current drivers: IndyCar Series; 51. (United States) Jacob Abel (part-time); Indy NXT: 32. (Netherlands) Niels Koolen
- Noted drivers: Jacob Abel
- Website: https://abelmotorsports.com/

Abel Motorsports is an American auto racing team which competes part-time in the IndyCar Series and full-time in the Indy NXT series. The team is owned by Bill Abel.

== History ==
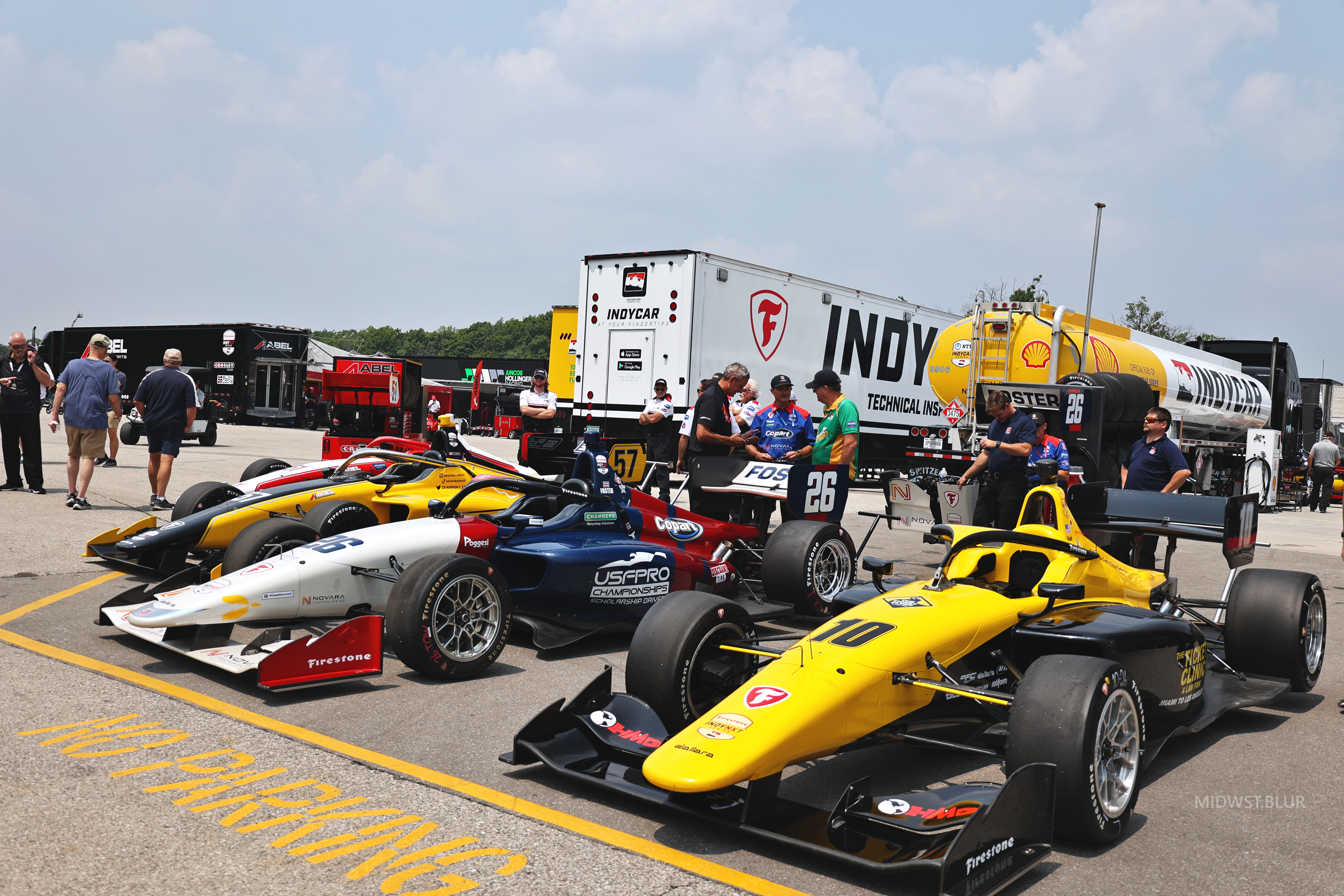
Abel Motorsports Indy NXT cars in the paddock at Road America, 2023

They have competed at numerous levels of the Road to Indy. In April 2024, at Barber Motorsports Park, the team recorded its first victory in the Indy NXT series.

After competing in the 2023 Indianapolis 500, the team announced an attempt to make the race in 2024. In early May, 2024, the team announced they had withdrawn their entry in the race, after driver R. C. Enerson failed to locate funding for the effort.

== Current series results ==
=== Indy Lights/Indy NXT ===
Year	Car	Drivers	Races	Wins	Poles	F/Laps	Podiums	Points	D.C.	T.C.
2022	Dallara IL-15	(United States) Jacob Abel	14	0	0	0	0	355	8th	4th
2022	Dallara IL-15	(Canada) Antonio Serravalle†	9	0	0	0	0	204	13th	4th
2022	Dallara IL-15	(United States) Ryan Phinny	4	0	0	0	0	77	14th	4th
2022	Dallara IL-15	(United States) Flinn Lazier	3	0	0	0	0	54	15th	4th
2023	Dallara IL-15	(United States) Jacob Abel	14	0	1	0	4	397	5th	3rd
2023	Dallara IL-15	(United States) Colin Kaminsky	8	0	0	0	0	159	17th	3rd
2023	Dallara IL-15	(United States) Yuven Sundaramoorthy	4	0	0	0	0	77	22nd	3rd
2023	Dallara IL-15	(Italy) Francesco Pizzi	4	0	0	0	0	55	22nd	3rd
2024	Dallara IL-15	(United States) Jacob Abel	14	3	3	3	10	517	2nd	3rd
2024	Dallara IL-15	(United States) Yuven Sundaramoorthy	14	0	0	0	2	309	8th	3rd
2024	Dallara IL-15	(United States) Jordan Missig	5	0	0	0	0	74	22nd	3rd
2024	Dallara IL-15	(United States) Taylor Ferns	4	0	0	0	0	53	24th	3rd
2024	Dallara IL-15	(United Kingdom) Josh Mason	2	0	0	0	0	27	25th	3rd
2025	Dallara IL-15	(United States) Myles Rowe	14	2	0	4	6	458	4th	N/A
2025	Dallara IL-15	(New Zealand) Callum Hedge	14	0	0	0	1	358	7th	N/A
2025	Dallara IL-15	(United States) Jordan Missig	14	0	0	1	0	273	9th	N/A
2025	Dallara IL-15	(United States) Jack William Miller	14	0	0	0	0	266	10th	N/A
2026	Dallara IL-15	(United States) Myles Rowe	17	1	0	1	3	388	8th	N/A
2026	Dallara IL-15	(United States) Max Garcia	17	1	0	0	2	381	10th	N/A
2026	Dallara IL-15	(United States) Colin Kaminsky	17	0	0	0	0	222	18th	N/A
2026	Dallara IL-15	(United States) Jordan Missig	13	0	0	0	0	216	19th	N/A
2026	Dallara IL-15	(United States) Jacob Abel	4	0	0	1	0	101	25th	N/A

* Season still in progress.

† Serravalle competed for HMD Motorsports with Dale Coyne Racing from round 3 onwards.

=== Complete IndyCar series results ===
(key)

Year	Chassis	Engine	Drivers	No.	1	2	3	4	5	6	7	8	9	10	11	12	13	14	15	16	17	18	Pts Pos	Pos
2023					STP	TXS	LBH	ALA	IMS	INDY	DET	ROA	MOH	TOR	IOW		IMS	NSH	GAT	POR	LAG			
2023	Dallara DW12	Chevrolet IndyCar V6t	(United States) R. C. Enerson (R)	50						32													36th	5
2026					STP	PHX	ARL	ALA	LBH	IMS	INDY	DET	GAT	ROA	MOH	NSH	POR	MAR	D.C.	MIL		LAG		
2026	Dallara DW12	Chevrolet IndyCar V6t	(United States) Jacob Abel	51							24												29th*	6*

== Former series results ==
=== U.S. F2000 National Championship ===
Year	Car	Drivers	Races	Wins	Poles	F/Laps	Podiums	Points	D.C.	T.C.
2015	Élan DP08	(United States) Bill Abel	3	0	0	0	0	23	22nd	10th
2018	Tatuus USF-17	(United States) Jacob Abel	5	0	0	0	0	47	23rd	12th

=== Formula 4 United States Championship ===
Year	Car	Drivers	Races	Wins	Poles	F/Laps	Podiums	Points	D.C.	T.C.
2017	Ligier JS F4	(United States) Jacob Abel	19	0	0	0	0	9	24th	14th
2017	Ligier JS F4	(United States) John Andrew Entwistle	6	0	0	0	0	0	35th	14th
2018	Ligier JS F4	(United States) Jacob Loomis	9	0	0	0	0	24	13th	6th
2018	Ligier JS F4	(United States) Jacob Abel	12	0	0	0	0	24	15th	6th

=== Formula Regional Americas Championship ===
Year	Car	Drivers	Races	Wins	Poles	F/Laps	Podiums	Points	D.C.	T.C.
2018	Ligier JS F3	(United States) Kyle Kirkwood	17	15	5	15	16	405	1st	1st
2018	Ligier JS F3	(United States) Jacob Abel	11	0	0	0	4	124	4th	1st
2019	Ligier JS F3	(United States) Jacob Abel	11	2	0	3	8	155	4th	3rd
2019	Ligier JS F3	(Netherlands) Danny van Dongen	1	0	0	0	0	0	NC	3rd
2020	Ligier JS F3	(United States) Jacob Abel	17	0	0	0	1	133	5th	4th
2020	Ligier JS F3	(United States) Blake Upton	9	0	0	0	0	17	14th	4th

=== Indy Pro 2000 Championship ===
Year	Car	Drivers	Races	Wins	Poles	F/Laps	Podiums	Points	D.C.	T.C.
2019	Tatuus PM-18	(Canada) Parker Thompson	16	2	3	1	8	344	3rd	3rd
2019	Tatuus PM-18	(United States) Jacob Abel	14	0	0	0	0	198	9th	3rd
2020	Tatuus PM-18	(United States) Jacob Abel	7	0	0	0	1	107	14th	N/A
2021	Tatuus PM-18	(United States) Jacob Abel	18	0	0	3	2	292	6th	5th

=== IndyCar Series ===
Year	Car	Drivers	Races	Wins	Poles	F/Laps	Podiums	Points	D.C.
2023	Dallara DW12	(United States) R. C. Enerson	1	0	0	0	0	5	36th
2026	Dallara DW12	(United States) Jacob Abel	1	0	0	0	0	6	29th

== Timeline ==
Current series
Indy NXT	2022–present
Former series
IndyCar Series	2023, 2026
U.S. F2000 National Championship	2015, 2018
Formula 4 United States Championship	2017–2018
Formula Regional Americas Championship	2018–2020
Indy Pro 2000 Championship	2019–2021
