= Colin Kaminsky =

American racing driver (born 1999)

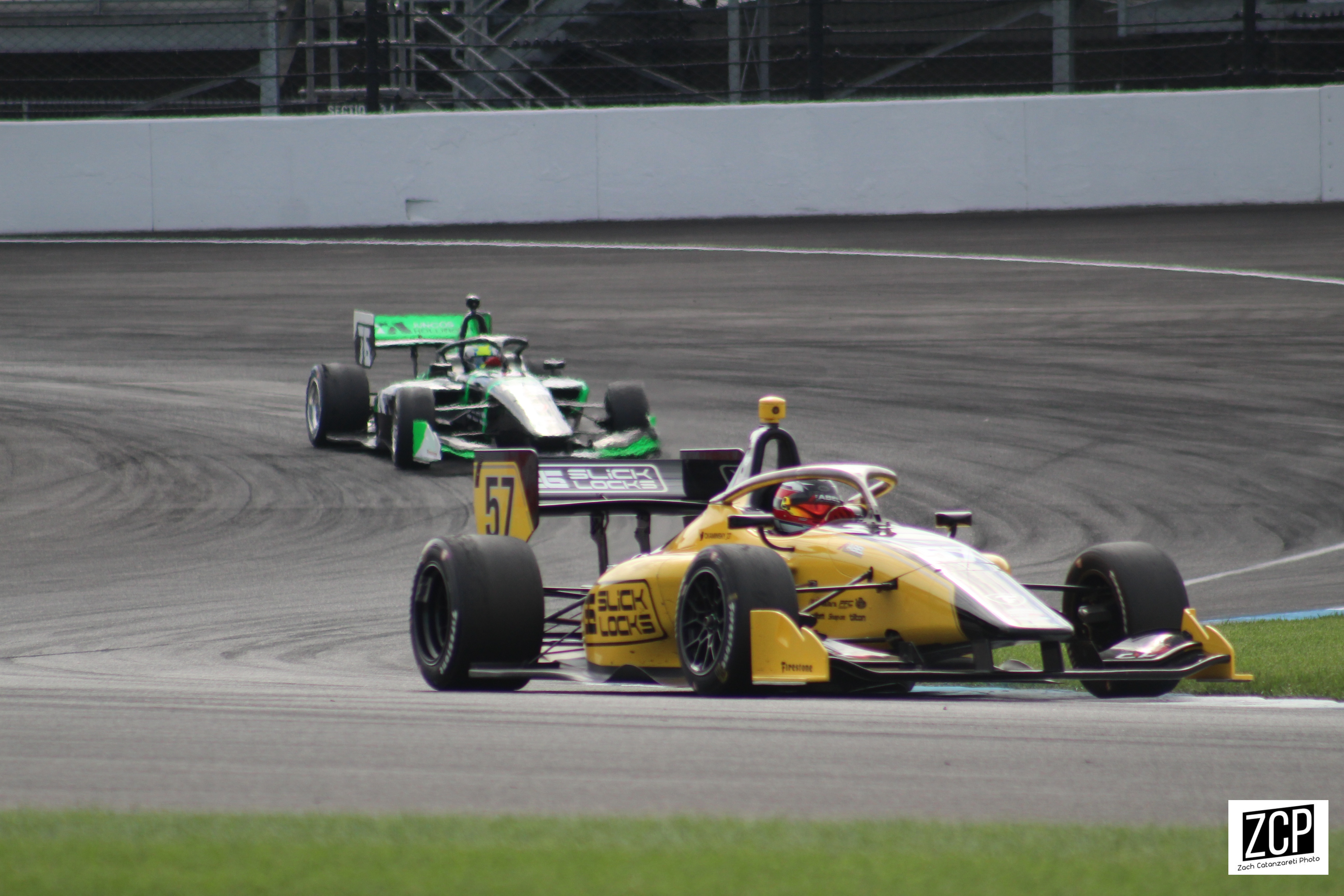
- Nationality: (United States) American
- Born: May 27, 1999 (age 27) Joliet, Illinois, United States

Indy NXT career
- Debut season: 2023
- Current team: Abel Motorsports
- Car number: TBA
- Starts: 8
- Wins: 0
- Podiums: 0
- Poles: 0
- Fastest laps: 0
- Best finish: 17th in 2023

Previous series
- 2020–22 2017–19: Indy Pro 2000 Championship; U.S. F2000 National Championship

Championship titles
- 0

Colin Kaminsky (born May 27, 1999) is an American racing driver set to drive in the Indy NXT for Abel Motorsports. He previously competed in the Indy Pro 2000 Championship with Pabst Racing before his Indy NXT debut. He has also previously competed in the Porsche Carrera Cup North America.

== Career ==
=== U.S. F2000 National Championship ===
In 2017, Kaminsky made his open-wheel racing debut in the U.S. F2000 National Championship, driving for Kaminsky Racing. He finished 18th in the final points standings with a best finish of eighth at Road America. He returned to the series the following year, this time driving a full season for DEForce Racing, where he finished tenth in the points after getting a best finish of fourth, once again at Road America. In 2019, Kaminsky switched to Pabst Racing, where he won three poles and earned seven podiums to finish fourth in the final points standings.

=== Indy Pro 2000 Championship ===
In 2020, Kaminsky moved over to the Indy Pro 2000 Championship, remaining with Pabst Racing. He finished eighth in the standings with one pole and three podium finishes. Kaminsky remained with the team the following season, but only ran the first seven races of the year and finished 13th in the points. Regardless, he was once again retained by the team in 2022, where he ran in the first ten races before being released. He finished 14th in the standings with three podium finishes.

=== Indy NXT ===
==== 2023 season ====
In 2023, it was announced that Kaminsky would drive for Abel Motorsports for the 2023 season. He ran the first six races, getting a best finish of sixth at Barber Motorsports Park, before skipping the next three races. He would make two more starts with the team at the Indianapolis Motor Speedway Road Course and World Wide Technology Raceway, and finished 17th in the final points standings.

==== 2026 season ====
After a year away from racing, Kaminsky returned to the Indy NXT for the 2026 season, once again with Abel Motorsports.

== Racing record ==
=== Racing career summary ===
Season	Series	Team	Races	Wins	Poles	F/Laps	Podiums	Points	Position
2017	U.S. F2000 National Championship	Kaminsky Racing	10	0	0	0	0	68	18th
2018	U.S. F2000 National Championship	DEForce Racing	14	0	0	0	0	134	11th
2019	U.S. F2000 National Championship	Pabst Racing	15	0	2	0	7	282	4th
2020	Indy Pro 2000 Championship	Pabst Racing	17	0	0	1	3	252	8th
2021	Indy Pro 2000 Championship	Pabst Racing	7	0	0	0	0	91	13th
2022	Indy Pro 2000 Championship	Pabst Racing	10	0	0	0	3	144	14th
2023	Indy NXT	Abel Motorsports	8	0	0	0	0	159	17th
2024	Porsche Carrera Cup North America	Topp Racing Performance	16	0	0	0	0	93	11th
2026	Indy NXT	Abel Motorsports	17	0	0	0	0	222	18th

* Season still in progress.

=== SCCA National Championship Runoffs results ===
Year	Track	Car	Engine	Class	Finish	Start	Status
2016	Mid-Ohio	Spec Racer	Ford	Spec Racer Ford Gen 3	39	25	Running
2017	Indianapolis Motor Speedway	Spec Racer	Ford	Spec Racer Ford Gen 3	5	7	Running
2021	Indianapolis Motor Speedway	Spec Racer	Ford	Spec Racer Ford Gen 3	64	14	Retired

=== American open-wheel racing results ===
==== U.S. F2000 National Championship ====
(key) (Races in bold indicate pole position) (Races in italics indicate fastest lap) (Races with * indicate most race laps led)

Year	Team	1	2	3	4	5	6	7	8	9	10	11	12	13	14	15	Rank	Points
2017	Kaminsky Racing	STP; 1; 16	STP; 2; 14	BAR; 1; 19	BAR; 2; 15	IMS; 1; 12	IMS; 2; 22	ROA; 1; 9	ROA; 2; 8	IOW	TOR; 1	TOR; 2	MOH; 1; 13	MOH; 2; 17	WGL		18th	68
2018	DEForce Racing	STP; 1; 6	STP; 2; 22	IMS; 1; 9	IMS; 2; 16	LOR; 13	ROA; 1; 12	ROA; 2; 4	TOR; 1; 12	TOR; 2; 18	MOH; 1; 12	MOH; 2; 7	POR; 1; 12	POR; 2; 17	LAG; 1; 8		10th	134
2019	Pabst Racing	STP; 1; 16	STP; 2; 5	IMS; 1; 4	IMS; 2; 10	**LOR**; 3	**ROA**; **1**; 2	ROA; 2; 4	TOR; 1; 6	TOR; 2; 12	MOH; 1; 3	MOH; 2; 3	POR; 1; 4	POR; 2; 4	LAG; 1; 3	**LAG**; **2**; 3	4th	282

==== Indy Pro 2000 Championship ====
(key) (Races in bold indicate pole position) (Races in italics indicate fastest lap) (Races with * indicate most race laps led)

Year	Team	1	2	3	4	5	6	7	8	9	10	11	12	13	14	15	16	17	18	Rank	Points
2020	Pabst Racing	ROA; 1; 3	ROA; 2; 6	MOH; 1; 6	MOH; 2; 15	MOH; 3; 16	LOR; 8	GMP; 13	IMS; 1; 6	IMS; 2; 11	IMS; 3; 10	MOH; 1; 6	MOH; 2; 6	NJM; 1; 7	NJM; 2; 8	**NJM**; **3**; 2	STP; 1; 9	STP; 2; 2		8th	252
2021	Pabst Racing	ALA; 1; 7	ALA; 2; 7	STP; 1; 9	STP; 2; 5	IMS; 1; 7	IMS; 2; 12	IMS; 3; 10	LOR	ROA; 1	ROA; 2	MOH; 1	MOH; 2	GMP	NJM; 1	NJM; 2	NJM; 3	MOH; 1	MOH; 2	13th	91
2022	Pabst Racing	STP; 1; 14	STP; 2; 12	ALA; 1; 2	ALA; 2; 12	IMS; 1; 3	IMS; 2; 2	IMS; 3; 10	IRP; 14	ROA; 1; 7	ROA; 2; 10	MOH; 1	MOH; 2	TOR; 1	TOR; 2	GMP	POR; 1	POR; 2	POR; 3	14th	144

==== Indy NXT ====
Year	Team	1	2	3	4	5	6	7	8	9	10	11	12	13	14	15	16	17	Rank	Points
2023	Abel Motorsports	STP; 11	BAR; 6	IMS; 12	DET; 16	DET; 8	RDA; 10	MOH	IOW	NSH	IMS; 11	GMP; 13	POR	LAG	LAG				17th	159
2026	Abel Motorsports	STP; 15	ARL; 24	BAR; 16	BAR; 18	IMS; 16	IMS; 15	DET; 10	GAT; 17	ROA; 20	ROA; 21	MOH; 17	MOH; 22	NSS; 19	POR; 12	MIL; 18	LAG; 15	LAG; 13	18th	222
