= Lucas Kohl =

Brazilian racing driver

- Nationality: (Brazil) Brazilian
- Born: Lucas Bell Kohl; May 4, 1998 (age 28) Santa Cruz do Sul, Brazil

Stock Car Pro Series / Império Endurance Brasil career
- Debut season: 2014
- Current team: HOT CAR COMPETIÇÔES (STOCK CAR PRO SERIES BRAZIL)
- Categorisation: FIA Silver
- Car number: 95
- Former teams: Motertech racing (Brazil), Mottin Racing (Brazil), KTF Sports(Brazil), Motorcar Racing (Brazil), Belardi Auto Racing (USA), Pabst Racing (USA), John Cummiskey Racing

Lucas Bell Kohl (born May 4, 1998) is a Brazilian racing driver. He has previously competed in Indy Lights, the U.S. F2000 National Championship, the Stock Series, and the Stock Car Pro Series.

== Racing record ==
=== Career summary ===
| Season | Series | Team | Races | Wins | Poles | F/Laps | Podiums | Points | Position |
|---|---|---|---|---|---|---|---|---|---|
| 2014 | Fórmula Junior RS | | 16 | 8 | 4 | 7 | 16 | 352 | 1st |
| 2014 | Formula 4 Sudamericana | | 3 | 0 | 0 | 0 | 0 | 26 | 15th |
| 2016 | U.S. F2000 National Championship | John Cummiskey Racing | 16 | 0 | 0 | 0 | 0 | 136 | 12th |
| 2017 | U.S. F2000 National Championship | Pabst Racing Services | 14 | 0 | 0 | 0 | 1 | 160 | 7th |
| 2018 | U.S. F2000 National Championship | Pabst Racing Services | 14 | 0 | 0 | 0 | 4 | 215 | 3rd |
| 2019 | Indy Lights | Belardi Auto Racing | 18 | 0 | 0 | 0 | 0 | 253 | 8th |
| 2020 | Stock Light | KTF Sports | 12 | 0 | 0 | 0 | 0 | 135 | 12th |
| 2020 | Império Endurance Brasil - P2 | Motorcar Racing | 6 | 3 | 2 | 2 | 4 | 480 | 1st |
| 2021 | Stock Light | KTF Sports | 16 | 1 | 2 | 0 | 2 | 193 | 9th |
| 2021 | Império Endurance Brasil - P1 | Motorcar Racing | 4 | 1 | 1 | 1 | 3 | 265 | 13th |
| 2021 | Império Endurance Brasil - GT4 | MC Tubarão | 1 | 1 | 0 | 0 | 1 | 160 | 7th |
| 2022 | Império Endurance Brasil - P2 | Mottin Racing | 2 | 1 | 0 | 1 | 1 | 150 | 36th |
| 2022 | Stock Series | Stock Med - Motortech | 16 | 0 | 0 | 0 | 3 | 248 | 5th |
| 2023 | Stock Car Pro Series | Hot Car Competições | 24 | 0 | 0 | 0 | 0 | 48 | 29th |

== Motorsports career results ==
=== American open–wheel racing results ===
==== U.S. F2000 National Championship ====
| Year | Team | 1 | 2 | 3 | 4 | 5 | 6 | 7 | 8 | 9 | 10 | 11 | 12 | 13 | 14 | 15 | 16 | Rank | Points |
|---|---|---|---|---|---|---|---|---|---|---|---|---|---|---|---|---|---|---|---|
| 2016 | John Cummiskey Racing | STP; 23 | STP; 14 | BAR; 21 | BAR; 21 | IMS; 6 | IMS; 8 | LOR; 10 | ROA; 11 | ROA; 13 | TOR; 10 | TOR; 12 | MOH; 9 | MOH; 18 | MOH; 12 | LAG; 9 | LAG; 9 | 12th | 136 |
| 2017 | Pabst Racing Services | STP; 12 | STP; 11 | BAR; 23 | BAR; 16 | IMS; 16 | IMS; 9 | ROA; 3 | ROA; 6 | IOW; 7 | TOR; 5 | TOR; 15 | MOH; 4 | MOH; 8 | WGL; 9 | | | 7th | 160 |
| 2018 | Pabst Racing Services | STP; 13 | STP; 3 | IMS; 26 | IMS; 7 | LOR; 4 | ROA; 23 | ROA; 3 | TOR; 9 | TOR; 15 | MOH; 2 | MOH; 2 | MOH; 6 | POR; 5 | POR; 5 | | | 3rd | 215 |

==== Indy Lights ====
| Year | Team | 1 | 2 | 3 | 4 | 5 | 6 | 7 | 8 | 9 | 10 | 11 | 12 | 13 | 14 | 15 | 16 | 17 | 18 | Rank | Points |
|---|---|---|---|---|---|---|---|---|---|---|---|---|---|---|---|---|---|---|---|---|---|
| 2019 | Belardi Auto Racing | STP; 9 | STP; 7 | COA; 8 | COA; 7 | IMS; 9 | IMS; 9 | INDY; 7 | RDA; 9 | RDA; 9 | TOR; 7 | TOR; 7 | MOH; 6 | MOH; 7 | GTW; 7 | POR; 8 | POR; 7 | LAG; 8 | LAG; 8 | 8th | 253 |

=== Stock Light ===
| Ano | Equipe | 1 | 2 | 3 | 4 | 5 | 6 | 7 | 8 | 9 | 10 | 11 | 12 | 13 | 14 | 15 | 16 | DC | Points |
|---|---|---|---|---|---|---|---|---|---|---|---|---|---|---|---|---|---|---|---|
| 2020 | KTF Racing | GOI; 8 | GOI; DNF | INT; DNS | INT; 9 | LON; 8 | LON; 11 | VCT; 5 | VCT; DNF | GOI; 5 | GOI; 4 | INT; 7 | INT; 10 | | | | | 12th | 135 |
| 2021 | KTF Sports | GOI; 7 | GOI; 9 | INT; 10 | INT; 3 | VCT; 6 | VCT; DNF | CWB; DSQ | CWB; 4 | CWB; 5 | CWB; 10 | VCT; 7 | VCT; DNF | SCS; 10 | SCS; 1 | INT; 7 | INT; 4 | 9th | 193 |
| 2022 | Motortech Competições | GOI; 5 | GOI; 3 | RJ; 5 | RJ; DNF | VCT; 4 | VCT; 4 | VPK; 4 | VPK; 4 | INT; 5 | INT; 10 | SCR; 3 | SCR; 4 | GOI; 6 | GOI; 5 | INT; 5 | INT; 3 | 5th | 248 |
