= Braden Eves =

American racing driver

- Nationality: (United States) American
- Born: May 3, 1999 (age 27) Gahanna, Ohio, U.S.

USF Pro 2000 Championship career
- Debut season: 2020
- Current team: Exclusive Autosport
- Categorisation: FIA Silver
- Car number: 92
- Former teams: Jay Howard Driver Development
- Starts: 40
- Wins: 5
- Podiums: 15
- Poles: 4
- Fastest laps: 2
- Best finish: 2nd in 2021

Previous series
- 2017-18 2018 2018-19: F4 USA Championship; F1600 Championship Series; U.S. F2000 National Championship

Championship titles
- 2019: USF2000 Championship

Braden Eves (born May 3, 1999) is an American racing driver. He last competed in the USF Pro 2000 Championship driving for Exclusive Autosport. He previously drove for Jay Howard Driver Development.

== Career ==
=== USF Pro 2000 Championship ===
Eves earned his first USF Pro 2000 Championship win at the Mid-Ohio Sports Car Course in 2020.

== Racing record ==
=== Career summary ===
Season	Series	Team	Races	Wins	Poles	F/Laps	Podiums	Points	Position
2017	Formula 4 United States Championship	Jay Howard's Motorsports Driver Development	8	1	0	0	6	130	6th
2018	Formula 4 United States Championship	Jay Howard's Motorsports Driver Development	9	0	0	0	0	24	14th
2018	F1600 Championship Series		3	2	1	1	3	144	18th
2018	U.S. F2000 National Championship	Newman Wachs Racing	2	0	0	0	0	18	32nd
2019	U.S. F2000 National Championship	Cape Motorsports	15	6	4	2	8	361	**1st**
2020	Indy Pro 2000 Championship	Exclusive Autosport	8	1	2	2	2	163	11th
2021	Indy Pro 2000 Championship	Exclusive Autosport	18	3	2	0	9	407	**2nd**
2022	Indy Pro 2000 Championship	Jay Howard Driver Development	18	1	0	0	5	304	5th
2024	USF Pro 2000 Championship	Exclusive Autosport	14	1	1	1	1	170	12th

* Season still in progress.

=== Complete Formula 4 United States Championship results ===
(key) (Races in bold indicate pole position) (Races in italics indicate fastest lap)

Year	Entrant	1	2	3	4	5	6	7	8	9	10	11	12	13	14	15	16	17	DC	Points
2018	Jay Howard's Motorsports Driver Development	VIR; 1; 10	VIR; 2; 17	VIR; 3; 8	ROA; 1; 6	ROA; 2; 5	ROA; 3; 10	MOH; 1; 22	MOH; 2; 12	MOH; 3; 14	PIT; 1	PIT; 2	PIT; 3	NJMP; 1	NJMP; 2	NJMP; 3	COTA; 1	COTA; 2	14th	24

=== American open–wheel racing results ===
==== U.S. F2000 National Championship ====
(key) (Races in bold indicate pole position) (Races in italics indicate fastest lap) (Races with * indicate most race laps led)

Year	Team	1	2	3	4	5	6	7	8	9	10	11	12	13	14	15	Rank	Points
2018	Newman Wachs Racing	STP; 1	STP; 2	IMS; 1	IMS; 2	LOR	ROA; 1	ROA; 2	TOR; 1	TOR; 2	MOH; 1	MOH; 2	MOH; 3	POR; 6	POR; 18		32nd	18
2019	Cape Motorsports	**STP**; **1**; 1	STP; 2; 1	**IMS**; **1**; 1	**IMS**; **2**; 1	LOR; 5	ROA; 1; 4	ROA; 2; 1	TOR; 1; 4	TOR; 2; 11	MOH; 1; 8	MOH; 2; 7	POR; 1; 2	POR; 2; 2	**LAG**; **1**; 4	LAG; 2; 1	1st	361

==== Indy Pro 2000 Championship / USF Pro 2000 Championship ====
(key) (Races in bold indicate pole position) (Races in italics indicate fastest lap) (Races with * indicate most race laps led)

Year	Team	1	2	3	4	5	6	7	8	9	10	11	12	13	14	15	16	17	18	Rank	Points
2020	Exclusive Autosport	ROA; 1; 4	ROA; 2; 5	**MOH**; **1**; 1	**MOH**; **2**; 9	MOH; 3; 9	LOR; 7	GMP; 2	IMS; 1; 12	IMS; 2 DNS	IMS; 3 DNS	NJM; 1	NJM; 2	NJM; 3	STP; 1	STP; 2				11th	163
2021	Exclusive Autosport	**ALA**; **1**; 1	ALA; 2; 4	**STP**; **1**; 1	STP; 2; 6	IMS; 1; 2	IMS; 2; 2	IMS; 3; 3	LOR; 4	ROA; 1; 4	ROA; 2; 4	MOH; 1; 5	MOH; 2; 9	GMP; 1	NJM; 1; 7	NJM; 2; 3	NJM; 3; 2	MOH; 1; 3	MOH; 2; 10	2nd	407
2022	Jay Howard Driver Development	STP; 1; 4	STP; 2; 3	ALA; 1; 5	ALA; 2; 2	IMS; 1 DSQ	IMS; 2; 9	IMS; 3; 2	IRP; 11	ROA; 1; 5	ROA; 2; 1*	MOH; 1; 8	MOH; 2; 8	TOR; 1; 12	TOR; 2; 5	GMP; 3	POR; 1; 7	POR; 2; 9	POR; 3; 11	5th	304
2024	Exclusive Autosport	STP; 1; 5	STP; 2; 8	LOU; 1; 12	LOU; 2; 16	LOU; 3; 16	IMS; 1; 18	IMS; 2; 4	IMS; 3; 11	**IRP**; 1*	ROA; 1; 15	ROA; 2; 6	ROA; 3; 14	MOH; 1; 12	MOH; 2; 17	TOR; 1	TOR; 2	POR; 1	POR; 2	12th	170

*Season still in progress.

Sporting positions
Preceded by Kyle Kirkwood	U.S. F2000 National Championship champion 2019	Succeeded by Christian Rasmussen
