= 2023 Indy NXT =

Indy NXT season

2023 Indy NXT season
- Firestone Indy NXT Series

Season
- Races: 14
- Start date: March 5
- End date: September 10

Awards
- Drivers' champion: (Denmark) Christian Rasmussen
- Teams' champion: (United States) HMD Motorsports with Dale Coyne Racing
- Rookie of the Year: (United States) Nolan Siegel

The 2023 Firestone Indy NXT Series was the 37th season of the Indy NXT open wheel motor racing series and the 21st sanctioned by IndyCar, acting as the primary support series for the IndyCar Series. Known as Indy Lights before 2023, the championship was rebranded following its acquisition by Penske Entertainment, the owner of the IndyCar Series, in 2022. This rebrand coincided with the three lower support series, still run by Anderson Promotions, also changing their branding.

Linus Lundqvist, the reigning 2022 Indy Lights champion, became a free agent after the season, so he did not defend his championship. Succeeding him as the first ever Indy NXT champion was Christian Rasmussen, who won the title after collecting five wins and nine podiums throughout the season. His team, HMD Motorsports with Dale Coyne Racing, won the Teams' championship.

== Series news ==
- On June 22, 2022, it was announced that after seven seasons, Cooper Tires would be replaced as tire supplier by Firestone.
- As part of the rebrand, the prize structure was changed. The champion received a sum of $850,000 to spend on tests at Texas Motor Speedway and Indianapolis Motor Speedway as well as to run the 2024 Indianapolis 500 and an additional IndyCar race. The drivers finishing second and third in the championship received $125,000 and $65,000 respectively.

== Team and driver chart ==
All teams used Dallara IL-15 cars with an AER produced Mazda sourced 2.0 litre engine and Firestone tires. The following drivers and teams competed in the series.

Team	No.	Drivers	Round(s)
Abel Motorsports	51	(United States) Jacob Abel	All
Abel Motorsports	55	(Italy) Francesco Pizzi R	9–10, 13–14
Abel Motorsports	57	(United States) Colin Kaminsky R	1–6, 10–11
Abel Motorsports	57	(United States) Yuven Sundaramoorthy R	9, 12–14
Andretti Autosport	26	(United Kingdom) Louis Foster R	All
Andretti Autosport	27	(New Zealand) Hunter McElrea	All
Andretti Autosport	28	(United Kingdom) Jamie Chadwick R	All
Andretti Autosport	29	(Republic of Ireland) James Roe	All
Cape Motorsports	47	(Pakistan) Enaam Ahmed R	1–7
Cape Motorsports	47	(Australia) Matthew Brabham	9
Cape Motorsports	47	(Brazil) Kiko Porto R	10, 13–14
Cape Motorsports	98	(United States) Jagger Jones R	1–10, 12-14
HMD Motorsports	14	(United States) Josh Pierson R	1, 3, 6–12
HMD Motorsports	14	(United Kingdom) Toby Sowery	2, 4–5
HMD Motorsports	21	(Cayman Islands) Kyffin Simpson	1–10, 12–14
HMD Motorsports with Dale Coyne Racing	3	(United States) Josh Green R	1–6
HMD Motorsports with Dale Coyne Racing	6	(Denmark) Christian Rasmussen	All
HMD Motorsports with Dale Coyne Racing	7	(United States) Christian Bogle	All
HMD Motorsports with Dale Coyne Racing	10	(Sweden) Rasmus Lindh	1
HMD Motorsports with Dale Coyne Racing	10	(United States) Reece Gold R	3–14
HMD Motorsports with Dale Coyne Racing	39	(United States) Nolan Siegel R	All
HMD Motorsports with Dale Coyne Racing	68	(Singapore) Danial Frost	All
HMD Motorsports with Force Indy	99	(United States) Ernie Francis Jr.	1–2, 4–14
Juncos Hollinger Racing	75	(Italy) Matteo Nannini R	1–7
Juncos Hollinger Racing	75	(Australia) Matthew Brabham	8, 11
Juncos Hollinger Racing	75	(Brazil) Victor Franzoni	9–10, 12–14
Juncos Hollinger Racing	76	(United States) Reece Gold R	1–2
Juncos Hollinger Racing	76	(Sweden) Rasmus Lindh	3–11
Juncos Hollinger Racing	76	(Australia) Matthew Brabham	12–14

R Eligible for Rookie of the Year
- Legacy Autosport planned to enter the series, but later confirmed it would not do so.

=== Team changes ===
- In July 2022, Cape Motorsports, a long-time USF2000 team with consistent success, announced they would enter Indy NXT for 2023. They won the 2022 USF2000 Driver's Championship with Michael d'Orlando.
- In September 2022, Juncos Hollinger Racing announced its return to the series after not competing in 2022 to focus on their IndyCar entry.
- In October 2022, Force Indy announced a collaboration with HMD Motorsports to co-run the No. 99 entry under the HMD Motorsports with Force Indy guise.

=== Driver changes ===
- On September 7, 2022, new entrant Cape Motorsport announced their first driver to be Jagger Jones, grandson of Parnelli Jones. Jones made the step up directly from the USF2000 series where he came fourth in 2022, skipping the Indy Pro 2000 series.
- On September 15, 2022, HMD Motorsports with Dale Coyne Racing confirmed Josh Green, stepping up from Indy Pro 2000 after coming 6th in 2022 with Turn 3 Motorsports.
- On October 6, 2022, Road to Indy double-champion Christian Rasmussen announced he would leave Andretti and move to HMD Motorsports with Dale Coyne Racing for the 2023 season. His replacement at the team was later announced to be Jamie Chadwick, three-time W Series champion and the first female driver in 13 years to compete full-time in Indy NXT.
- On October 17, 2022, Rasmus Lindh announced his return to Indy NXT with HMD Motorsports with Dale Coyne Racing. He last competed in the series in 2021, coming 14th with Juncos Racing.
- On October 18, 2022, HMD Motorsports announced the signing of Josh Pierson for a part-time schedule alongside his WEC and IMSA campaigns. His signing completed HMD's eight-car entry, confirming the exit of Manuel Sulaimán and reigning champion Linus Lundqvist.
- On January 4, 2023, Andretti confirmed that James Roe would move to their team. He drove for TJ Speed and HMD Motorsports in 2022 and came 12th in the championship. Roe replaced Matthew Brabham, who returned to competing in the Stadium Super Trucks Series.
- On January 18, 2023, IndyCar team Dale Coyne Racing announced Andretti driver Sting Ray Robb as their 2023 driver for the No. 51 car. Louis Foster, 2022 Indy Pro 2000 champion, was signed to replace him.
- On February 3, 2023, IndyCar team A. J. Foyt Racing announced a multi-year deal with Global Racing Group with HMD Motorsports driver Benjamin Pedersen, who came fifth in the 2022 season.
- On February 8, 2023, Abel Motorsports announced Colin Kaminsky as their second driver alongside Jacob Abel. He made the step up after three years in Indy Pro 2000, achieving six podiums in that period. Abel Motorsports' three other drivers would leave the series, with Antonio Serravalle moving to the IMSA SportsCar Championship.
- On February 25, 2023, Enaam Ahmed announced his move to new team Cape Motorsports. Ahmed stepped up from the Indy Pro 2000 championship after finishing the 2022 season in third.

=== Mid-season changes ===
- On March 14, 2023, Toby Sowery announced his return to the Indy NXT series. He last competed in 2021 and was signed by HMD Motorsports to replace Josh Pierson for the races at Barber and Detroit. He was originally due to also drive at Laguna Seca, but did not do so.
- On April 28, 2023, Rasmus Lindh announced he had parted ways with HMD Motorsports with Dale Coyne Racing due to funding issues.
- On May 5, 2023, it was announced that Reece Gold mutually parted ways with Juncos Hollinger Racing to join HMD Motorsports with Dale Coyne Racing in the No. 10 entry, replacing Rasmus Lindh.
- On May 10, 2023, Juncos Hollinger Racing announced that Rasmus Lindh would drive the No. 76 entry, thereby completing a swap between Lindh and Gold.
- On May 11, 2023, HMD Motorsports and Force Indy announced that Ernie Francis Jr. would be unable to compete in the third round of the championship because of a fractured wrist he sustained at the start of the Barber event. Francis Jr. returned to competition from round 4 onwards.
- Josh Green and Colin Kaminsky left the championship ahead of round 7 at Mid-Ohio.
- On July 18, 2023, Juncos Hollinger Racing announced the immediate termination of their contract with Matteo Nannini. Two days later, his replacement for Iowa was revealed to be Matthew Brabham, who came third with Andretti in 2022.
- Enaam Ahmed was absent from Iowa, bringing the grid down to 16 cars. In the same press release that announced former Cape Motorsports driver Matthew Brabham as Ahmed's substitute driver for the Nashville race, it was announced that Ahmed wouldn't return to the team for the remainder of the season.
- On July 26, 2023, Abel Motorsports announced that USF Pro 2000 drivers Yuven Sundaramoorthy and Francesco Pizzi would be driving the No. 57 and No. 55 cars respectively for parts of the rest of the season. Both were announced to drive at Nashville and Laguna Seca, with Sundaramoorthy also doing the Portland race and Pizzi also doing the second Indianapolis race.
- On August 1, 2023, Juncos Hollinger announced Victor Franzoni to drive the No. 75, previously piloted by Nannini and then by substitute Brabham, for the remaining road and street course races. Franzoni last competed in the category in 2018, also for Juncos, and came fifth.
- On August 9, 2023, Cape Motorsports announced that USF Pro 2000 racer Kiko Porto would make his Indy NXT debut in the No. 47 car previously piloted by Ahmed and then by substitute Brabham, in the rounds at Indianapolis and Laguna Seca. Brabham once again filled in at WWTR.
- On August 21, 2023, Kyffin Simpson announced his absence from round 11 at WWTR due to the round clashing with the European Le Mans Series, where he competes for Algarve Pro Racing.
- Cape Motorsport was absent from Gateway as Kiko Porto prioritized his USF Pro 2000 campaign and Jagger Jones also did not compete, bringing the grid for the event down to 15 cars. Cape returned with one car for Jones for Portland.
- On August 31, 2023, Juncos Hollinger announced that Brabham would fill in for Rasmus Lindh at the last two weekends at Portland and Laguna Seca.

== Schedule ==
The schedule was released on November 3, 2022; with the only minor change from last season being the changed location of the Detroit round from Belle Isle to downtown Detroit. A small update to the schedule was announced on February 22, 2023: the Indianapolis doubleheader was split, with one race running on the GMR Grand Prix weekend and the other race moved to the NASCAR Cup Series Verizon 200 weekend in August.

Rd.	Date	Race name	Track	Location
1	March 5	Indy NXT by Firestone Grand Prix of St. Petersburg	R Streets of St. Petersburg	St. Petersburg, Florida
2	April 30	Indy NXT by Firestone Grand Prix of Alabama	R Barber Motorsports Park	Birmingham, Alabama
3	May 13	Indy NXT by Firestone Grand Prix of Indianapolis	R Indianapolis Motor Speedway Road Course	Speedway, Indiana
4	June 3–4	Indy NXT by Firestone Detroit Grand Prix	R Detroit Street Circuit	Detroit, Michigan
5	June 3–4	Indy NXT by Firestone Detroit Grand Prix	R Detroit Street Circuit	Detroit, Michigan
6	June 18	Indy NXT by Firestone Grand Prix at Road America	R Road America	Elkhart Lake, Wisconsin
7	July 2	Indy NXT by Firestone Grand Prix at Mid-Ohio	R Mid-Ohio Sports Car Course	Lexington, Ohio
8	July 22	Indy NXT by Firestone at Iowa Speedway	O Iowa Speedway	Newton, Iowa
9	August 6	Indy NXT by Firestone Music City Grand Prix	R Nashville Street Circuit	Nashville, Tennessee
10	August 11	Indy NXT by Firestone Grand Prix of Indianapolis	R Indianapolis Motor Speedway Road Course	Speedway, Indiana
11	August 26	Indy NXT by Firestone OUTFRONT Showdown	O World Wide Technology Raceway	Madison, Illinois
12	September 3	Indy NXT by Firestone Grand Prix of Portland	R Portland International Raceway	Portland, Oregon
13	September 9–10	Indy NXT by Firestone Grand Prix of Monterey	R WeatherTech Raceway Laguna Seca	Monterey, California
14	September 9–10	Indy NXT by Firestone Grand Prix of Monterey	R WeatherTech Raceway Laguna Seca	Monterey, California

O Oval track
R Road/street course

== Race results ==
Rd.	Track	Pole position	Fastest lap	Most laps led	Race winner	
Rd.	Track	Pole position	Fastest lap	Most laps led	Driver	Team
1	(United States) Streets of St. Petersburg	(United Kingdom) Louis Foster	(Denmark) Christian Rasmussen	(United States) Jacob Abel	(Singapore) Danial Frost	HMD Motorsports with Dale Coyne Racing
2	(United States) Barber Motorsports Park	(Denmark) Christian Rasmussen	(Denmark) Christian Rasmussen	(Denmark) Christian Rasmussen	(Denmark) Christian Rasmussen	HMD Motorsports with Dale Coyne Racing
3	(United States) Indianapolis Motor Speedway Road Course	(Italy) Matteo Nannini	(Italy) Matteo Nannini	(Italy) Matteo Nannini	(Italy) Matteo Nannini	Juncos Hollinger Racing
4	(United States) Detroit Street Circuit	(United Kingdom) Louis Foster	(New Zealand) Hunter McElrea	(United States) Reece Gold	(United States) Reece Gold	HMD Motorsports with Dale Coyne Racing
5	(United States) Detroit Street Circuit	(United Kingdom) Louis Foster	(New Zealand) Hunter McElrea	(United States) Nolan Siegel	(United States) Nolan Siegel	HMD Motorsports with Dale Coyne Racing
6	(United States) Road America	(Cayman Islands) Kyffin Simpson	(United States) Nolan Siegel	(United States) Nolan Siegel	(United States) Nolan Siegel	HMD Motorsports with Dale Coyne Racing
7	(United States) Mid-Ohio Sports Car Course	(Denmark) Christian Rasmussen	(Denmark) Christian Rasmussen	(Denmark) Christian Rasmussen	(United Kingdom) Louis Foster	Andretti Autosport
8	(United States) Iowa Speedway	(United States) Jacob Abel	(United Kingdom) Louis Foster	(Denmark) Christian Rasmussen	(Denmark) Christian Rasmussen	HMD Motorsports with Dale Coyne Racing
9	(United States) Nashville Street Circuit	(Denmark) Christian Rasmussen	(New Zealand) Hunter McElrea	(Denmark) Christian Rasmussen	(Denmark) Christian Rasmussen	HMD Motorsports with Dale Coyne Racing
10	(United States) Indianapolis Motor Speedway Road Course	(New Zealand) Hunter McElrea	(United Kingdom) Louis Foster	(New Zealand) Hunter McElrea	(New Zealand) Hunter McElrea	Andretti Autosport
11	(United States) World Wide Technology Raceway	(Denmark) Christian Rasmussen	(New Zealand) Hunter McElrea	(Denmark) Christian Rasmussen	(Denmark) Christian Rasmussen	HMD Motorsports with Dale Coyne Racing
12	(United States) Portland International Raceway	(United Kingdom) Louis Foster	(United States) Nolan Siegel	(United Kingdom) Louis Foster	(United Kingdom) Louis Foster	Andretti Autosport
13	(United States) WeatherTech Raceway Laguna Seca	(New Zealand) Hunter McElrea	(Denmark) Christian Rasmussen	(New Zealand) Hunter McElrea	(New Zealand) Hunter McElrea	Andretti Autosport
14	(United States) WeatherTech Raceway Laguna Seca	(Denmark) Christian Rasmussen	(Denmark) Christian Rasmussen	(Denmark) Christian Rasmussen	(Denmark) Christian Rasmussen	HMD Motorsports with Dale Coyne Racing

== Season report ==
=== Opening rounds ===
The first round of the newly rebranded Indy NXT began with a record 19 cars in St. Petersburg, the most entries since 2012. Andretti's Louis Foster took pole position for the event. HMD's Christian Rasmussen moved up to second place during the opening part of the race, before Abel's Jacob Abel swept past both of them on the restart of a caution. Foster held on to him before clipping the wall and falling down the field. On the next restart, HMD's Nolan Siegel mimicked Abel's move to jump into the lead from third, while his teammate Danial Frost jumped to second. Another restart, the fifth one of the race, another move for the lead: Frost took the lead from Siegel and led him and Abel home.

A break of almost two months followed before the second round at Barber Motorsports Park, where Rasmussen was on pole position. He built a two-second gap over Siegel before a safety car nullified his efforts. Siegel could do nothing on the restart, however, so Rasmussen kept leading until another safety car was called. This then turned into a red flag, when the recovery vehicle sent out to retrieve Foster's car got stuck in the mud. After that stoppage, the top two remained the same. Rasmussen took the win and with it the championship lead, by four points over Siegel. Foster's demise meanwhile had promoted HMD's Toby Sowery to the podium on his return to the series.

Juncos's Matteo Nannini took the teams' first pole position since 2019 for the first race at Indianapolis Motor Speedway. He needed three attempts to lead the field to green to the satisfaction of the officials and then benefitted from the cars behind him battling. He built a 1.5 second gap, while Foster overtook second-placed Andretti man Hunter McElrea and set out after Nannini. While HMD's Kyffin Simpson overtook Rasmussen for third, Nannini and Foster started battling. Foster could not find a way past Nannini, though, and had to settle for second, while Nannini took his maiden win. Rasmussen, fifth in the end, still grew his standings lead to 18 points as Siegel could only manage 13th place.

Foster took a double pole position despite having a broken suspension on Indy NXT's debut around the Detroit Street Circuit. Foster's first race ended quickly, though, when McElrea tipped him into a spin through the first turn. The New Zealander was hit with a drive-through penalty that promoted HMD's Reece Gold to the front. Siegel continuously attacked him after the restart and got by. He looked set to win the race, before a gearbox issue on the final lap saw him tumble down the order. Gold took the win, ahead of Cape's Jagger Jones and HMD's Ernie Francis Jr. in third. Siegel came home eighth, still one spot ahead of Rasmussen, to shorten the standings gap down to 15 points.

A day later, Siegel was on a mission to get redemption. He jumped Foster and Rasmussen at the start as the pair battled for position. Rasmussen then set out after him, but Siegel kept him behind until a safety car was called when Jones hit the wall. Rasmussen got alongside Siegel at the restart, but Siegel held on to the lead. He then pulled out a two-second gap before another safety car interruption, this time for Simpson. This second restart with two laps to go posed no threat to Siegel, and he led Rasmussen home to again shrink the championship lead, down to only two points. Foster had spent the whole race in third place and finished there after holding off McElrea in the end.

=== Mid-season rounds ===
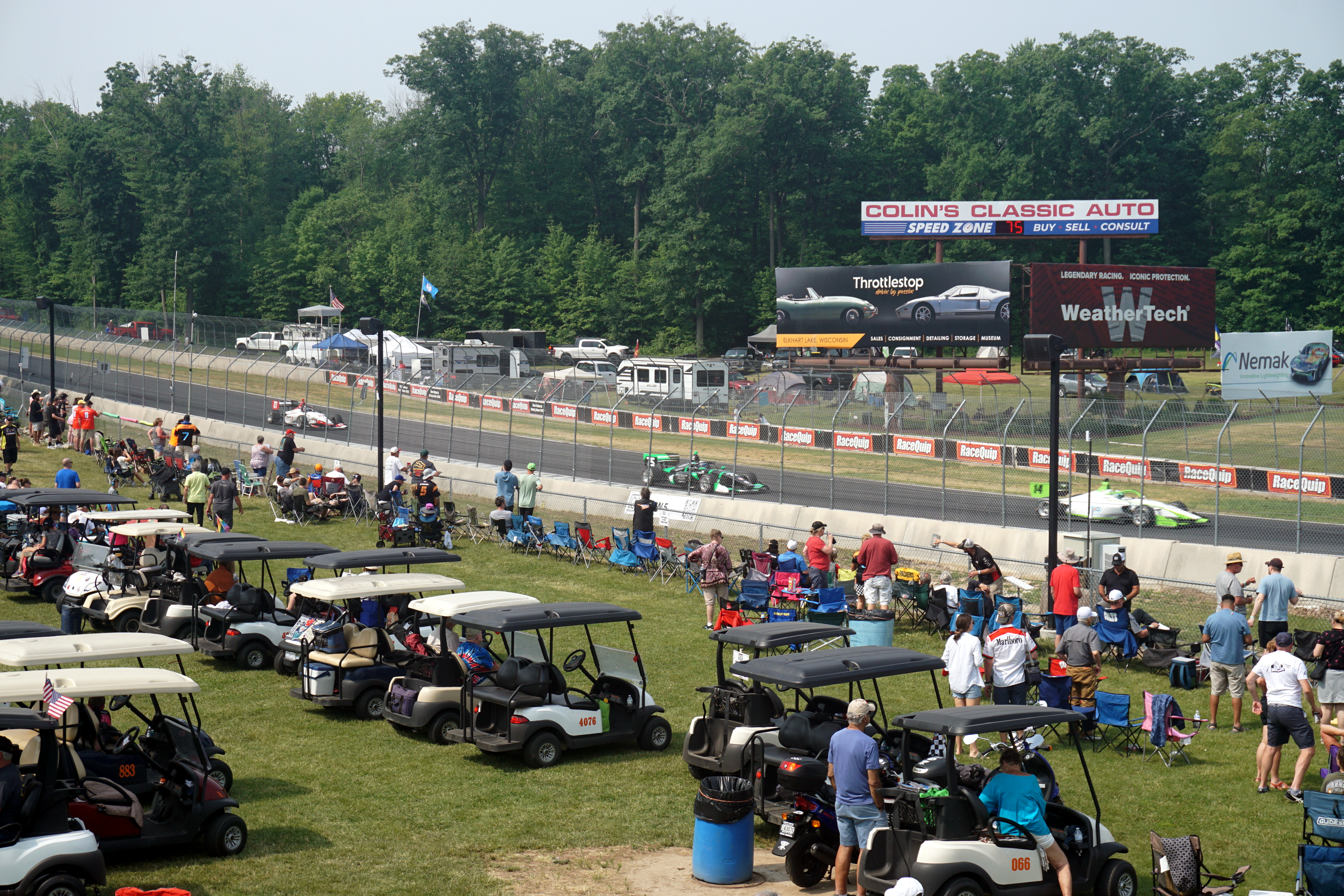
Indy NXT race at Road America

Simpson took his maiden pole position when the championship visited Road America. He ran off the road into the first turn, however, ceding his lead to Gold ahead of Foster and Siegel and dropping down to seventh. Foster soon attacked Gold, but could not get by, so he lost momentum. Siegel took the opportunity to jump into second. A few laps later, he was the one to attack Gold, and he did so successfully to claim the lead. After an interruption when championship leader Rasmussen retired, Gold had to give up on his podium hopes when Abel and later also McElrea got by him. Siegel's win saw him claim the championship lead, 39 points ahead of Rasmussen, who was classified 19th.

The first half of the season ended at Mid-Ohio, where Rasmussen was on pole position. Two safety cars, the first one brought out when Frost spun and the second when HMD's Christian Bogle beached his car, did not disturb the Dane. He kept leading until rain started to fall late in the race. He made a mistake, that allowed Foster past him. Championship leader Siegel then lost control over his car on the final lap to drop out of the top five into 15th. On the subsequent restart, Simpson was able to overtake Rasmussen for second. Foster held on to take his maiden win, while Siegels late error, coupled with Rasmussen's third place, saw the American's championship lead reduced to 17 points.

Indy NXT's first oval race came at Iowa Speedway, and Abel took pole position. His lead only lasted for two laps before Rasmussen took the lead. The overtake slashed Abel's momentum. He dropped down behind Siegel and battle for third with McElrea. Later in the race, McElrea began attacking Siegel for second. The cars made contact, damaging Siegel's toe link and sending him into the pits. McElrea was later overtaken by Juncos's Rasmus Lindh, while Abel had closed up to Rasmussen. He was much faster than the race leader, but ran out of laps and finished second in a photo-finish, only 0.1 seconds behind. Rasmussen's win saw him take the championship lead by 22 points over Siegel.

Qualifying in Nashville was cancelled due to bad weather, so Rasmussen started from pole position. He kept his lead ahead of Siegel, while the latter dropped down the order. McElrea, thus promoted to second, could not keep up with Rasmussen. Three times the race was interrupted by safety car periods, three times Rasmussen's lead was reduced to nothing, three times he got clean restarts and was not troubled by McElrea behind him. He took a lights-to-flag win to extend his championship lead over Siegel, who finished fifth, to 44 points. Abel completed the podium after a race-long battle with Foster, before the pair made contact and the latter dropped back.

McElrea took pole position on the series' return to Indianapolis Motor Speedway. Foster got past Simpson into third and further up into second past his teammate James Roe by the end of lap two. He then shadowed McElrea until lap 27, where he attempted a move that resulted in contact, forcing him into retirement. This brought Roe back into second, 6.5 seconds back from the lead. He brought that gap down to almost nothing entering the final lap and looked set to overtake McElrea. The New Zealander defended hard into turn one to keep the lead and take the win. This saw him take second place in the standings, 33 points behind Rasmussen, who struggled and finished sixth.

=== Closing rounds ===
The weekend at Gateway was affected by a rain storm that saw qualifying cancelled and the race delayed by multiple hours. Rasmussen held his lead, based on entrant points, while Roe rose from sixth to second, before McElrea got back past and Roe dropped down the order. Traffic then brought Rasmussen back into the clutches of McElrea, who took the lead in a smart move when Rasmussen attempted to lap McElrea's teammate Jamie Chadwick. Rasmussen then used a similar move to get back in front when McElrea lapped Lindh. A late caution reignited the fight for the other podium spaces, with Foster coming out second ahead of McElrea. Rasmussen grew his standings lead to 50 points.

The penultimate destination was Portland International Raceway, where Foster took pole position. The opening lap began with a multi-car crash involving championship leaders Rasmussen and McElrea. Juncos's Victor Franzoni had locked up into turn one and hit Gold, causing further contact and spins. Foster took the restart ahead of Frost and Siegel, and the top trio remained that way until the final stages of the race. There, Siegel got past Frost to finish second. Rasmussen had managed to stay on the lead lap after the crash and salvaged fifth place, while McElrea finished 15th. This extended Rasmussen's lead to 65 points, while Siegel closed up to only five points behind McElrea.

The final weekend of the season at Laguna Seca began with McElrea and Rasmussen sharing pole positions. Little action happened in the opening stages of the race, with McElrea holding the lead ahead of Rasmussen. A safety car for the retiring Foster bunched the field back up, but the restart lasted only a few corners before another caution. Two more cautions further disrupted the race before it ended, also under yellow flag conditions. Rasmussen had chosen not to attack McElrea for the lead, as he only needed to start the next race to secure his championship. McElrea was now 53 points behind him, with Siegel a further 44 points back after having to retire his car.

Rasmussen became the inaugural Indy NXT champion when he started the final race of the season on pole position. He completely controlled the race, building a sizable gap to the rest of the field before a safety car for Simpson and Gold colliding nullified his advantage. He was unassailable at the restart, breaking away instantly and lapping much faster than everyone else. By the end of the race, he had a 17-second lead. McElrea himself was similarly unchallenged from behind, as he also built a 19-second gap to Foster in third. Siegel finished seventh to claim third in the standings, five points ahead of Foster, which also secured him the Rookie of the Year title.

The championship's first year under the Indy NXT guise was its strongest in a long time. Even as mid-season driver changes set in and drivers withdrew their entries, the grid never dropped below 15 drivers, while the previous year had a maximum of 14 cars competing at a time.

== Championship standings ==
=== Drivers' Championship ===
Scoring system

Position	**1st**	**2nd**	**3rd**	**4th**	**5th**	**6th**	**7th**	**8th**	**9th**	**10th**	**11th**	**12th**	**13th**	**14th**	**15th**	**16th**	**17th**	**18th**	**19th**	**20th**
Points	50	40	35	32	30	28	26	24	22	20	19	18	17	16	15	14	13	12	11	10

- The driver who qualified on pole was awarded one additional point.
- Every driver who led at least one lap was awarded a bonus point, the driver who led the most laps got two points.

Pos	Driver	STP	ALA	IMS1	DET		ROA	MOH	IOW	NSH	IMS2	GAT	POR	LAG		Points
1	(Denmark) Christian Rasmussen	4	**1**^{L}*	5	9	2	19	**3**^{L}*	1^{L*}	**1**^{1L}*	6	**1**^{1L}*	5	2	**1**^{L*}	539
2	(New Zealand) Hunter McElrea	5	13	4	7^{L}	4	3	4	5	2	**1**^{L}*	3^{L}	15	**1**^{L}*	2	474
3	(United States) Nolan Siegel RY	2^{L}	2	13	8^{L}	1^{L}*	1^{L}*	15	15	5	12	6	2	16	7	415
4	(United Kingdom) Louis Foster R	**14**^{L}	14	2	**19**	**3**^{L}	6	1^{L}	7	6	17	2	**1**^{L}*	18	3	410
5	(United States) Jacob Abel	3^{L}*	16	9	4	9	2	6	**2**^{L}	3	4	4	16	14	5	397
6	(Singapore) Danial Frost	1^{L}	10	11	18	5	7	11	14	16	7	5	3	3	6	361
7	(Republic of Ireland) James Roe	17	5	7	10	6	5	12	9	4	2	15	8	9	15	335
8	(United States) Reece Gold R	8	17	16	1^{L}*	12	4^{L}	5	12	9	3	9	14	10	14	334
9	(United States) Ernie Francis Jr.	6	8		3	7	12	13	8	18	14	8	7	7	8	300
10	(Cayman Islands) Kyffin Simpson	10	18	3	13	17	**8**	2	16	15	5		13	4	17	283
11	(United States) Christian Bogle	12	7	18	6	15	13	16	13	12	13	11	4	11	16	266
12	(United Kingdom) Jamie Chadwick R	13	11	15	11	16	15	10	10	8	10	12	6	15	12	262
13	(United States) Jagger Jones R	18	12	14	2	19	9	14	11	17	18		12	8	10	241
14	(Sweden) Rasmus Lindh	9		8	12	14	18	7	3	7	15	14				210
15	(United States) Josh Pierson R	16		17			11	9	6	10	8	10	17			173
16	(Australia) Matthew Brabham								4	13		7	9	5	4	159
17	(United States) Colin Kaminsky R	11	6	12	16	8	10				11	13				159
18	(Pakistan) Enaam Ahmed R	19	4	10	5	10	17	8								150
19	(Italy) Matteo Nannini R	15	15	**1**^{L}*	14	11	16	17								146
20	(United States) Josh Green R	7	9	6	15	18	14									119
21	(Brazil) Victor Franzoni									14	19		11	6	13	91
22	(United States) Yuven Sundaramoorthy R									11			10	13	9	77
23	(United Kingdom) Toby Sowery		3		17	13										65
24	(Italy) Francesco Pizzi R									19	16			12	18	55
25	(Brazil) Kiko Porto R										9			17	11	54
Pos	Driver	STP	ALA	IMS1	DET		ROA	MOH	IOW	NSH	IMS2	GAT	POR	LAG		Points

Color	Result
Gold	Winner
Silver	2nd place
Bronze	3rd place
Green	4th & 5th place
Light Blue	6th–10th place
Dark Blue	Finished (Outside Top 10)
Purple	Did not finish
Red	Did not qualify (DNQ)
Brown	Withdrawn (Wth)
Black	Disqualified (DSQ)
White	Did not start (DNS)
Blank	Did not participate (DNP)
Blank	Not competing

**In-line notation**
**Bold**	Pole position (1 point)
Italics	Ran fastest race lap
^{L}	Led a race lap (1 point)
*	Led most race laps (2 points)
^{1}	Qualifying cancelled no bonus point awarded
R	Rookie
RY	Rookie of the Year

- Ties in points broken by number of wins, or best finishes.

=== Teams' championship ===
Scoring system

Position	**1st**	**2nd**	**3rd**	**4th**	**5th**	**6th**	**7th**	**8th**	**9th**	**10th+**
Points	22	18	15	12	10	8	6	4	2	1

- Single car teams received 3 bonus points as an equivalency to multi-car teams
- Only the best two results counted for teams fielding more than two entries

Pos	Team	STP	ALA	IMS1	DET		ROA	MOH	IOW	NSH	IMS2	GAT	POR	LAG		Points
1	HMD Motorsports with Dale Coyne Racing	1	1	5	1	1	1	3	1	1	3	1	2	2	1	433
1	HMD Motorsports with Dale Coyne Racing	2	2	6	6	2	4	5	10	5	6	5	3	3	6	433
2	Andretti Autosport	4	5	2	7	3	3	1	5	2	1	2	1	1	2	364
2	Andretti Autosport	9	8	4	8	4	5	4	7	4	2	3	4	9	3	364
3	Abel Motorsports	3	6	8	4	6	2	6	2	3	4	4	7	10	5	184
3	Abel Motorsports	8	11	10	12	7	8			8	9	9	11	11	8	184
4	Juncos Hollinger Racing	6	10	1	9	9	11	7	3	6	11	6	6	5	4	144
4	Juncos Hollinger Racing	10	12	7	11	11	13	12	4	10	13	10	8	6	11	144
5	HMD Motorsports	7	3	3	10	10	6	2	6	7	5	8	10	4	12	133
5	HMD Motorsports	11	13	12	13	12	9	9	11	11	7		12			133
6	HMD Motorsports with Force Indy	5	7		3	5	10	10	8	13	10	7	5	7	7	113
7	Cape Motorsports	12	4	9	2	8	7	8	9	9	8		9	8	9	90
7	Cape Motorsports	13	9	11	5	13	12	11		12	12			12	10	90
Pos	Team	STP	ALA	IMS1	DET		ROA	MOH	IOW	NSH	IMS2	GAT	POR	LAG		Points

== See also ==
- 2023 IndyCar Series
- 2023 USF Pro 2000 Championship
- 2023 USF2000 Championship
- 2023 USF Juniors
