= 2020 Indy Lights =

Cancelled Indy Lights season

2020 Indy Lights season
- Indy Lights

Season
- Races: ~~18~~
- Start date: ~~March 14~~
- End date: ~~September 20~~

Awards

The 2020 Indy Lights season was to have been the 35th season of the Indy Lights open wheel motor racing series and the 19th sanctioned by IndyCar, acting as the primary support series for the IndyCar Series. The opening round at St. Petersburg was suspended mid-way due to the COVID-19 pandemic. The following rounds were also delayed, as a revised calendar was released on March 26, 2020. The season was later cancelled entirely and the series went into a hiatus until 2021, making it the first time in history that the Indy Lights season did not run.

== Team and driver chart ==
The following drivers and teams were announced, and took part in an official practice session at St. Petersburg prior to the cancellation of the season.

Team	No.	Drivers
Andretti Autosport	27	(United States) Robert Megennis
Andretti Autosport	28	(United States) Kyle Kirkwood
Andretti Autosport	48	(France) Tristan Charpentier
Andretti Autosport	68	(Singapore) Danial Frost
Belardi Auto Racing	5	(United Kingdom) Toby Sowery
Belardi Auto Racing	10	(Sweden) Rasmus Lindh
Exclusive Autosport	90	(Russia) Nikita Lastochkin
HMD Motorsports	11	(Canada) Antonio Serravalle
HMD Motorsports	55	(Uruguay) Santiago Urrutia
HMD Motorsports	79	(United States) David Malukas

== Schedule ==
The following was the revised schedule prior to the cancellation of the season.

Rd.	Date	Race name	Track	Location
1	June 19–21	TBA	R Road America	Elkhart Lake, Wisconsin
2	June 19–21	TBA	R Road America	Elkhart Lake, Wisconsin
3	June 19–21	TBA	R Road America	Elkhart Lake, Wisconsin
4	July 2–3	TBA	R Indianapolis Motor Speedway road course	Speedway, Indiana
5	July 2–3	TBA	R Indianapolis Motor Speedway road course	Speedway, Indiana
6	August 7–9	TBA	R Mid-Ohio Sports Car Course	Lexington, Ohio
7	August 7–9	TBA	R Mid-Ohio Sports Car Course	Lexington, Ohio
8	August 7–9	TBA	R Mid-Ohio Sports Car Course	Lexington, Ohio
9	August 21	Freedom 100	O Indianapolis Motor Speedway oval	Speedway, Indiana
10	August 29	TBA	O Gateway Motorsports Park	Madison, Illinois
11	September 11–13	TBA	R Portland International Raceway	Portland, Oregon
12	September 11–13	TBA	R Portland International Raceway	Portland, Oregon
13	September 18–20	TBA	R WeatherTech Raceway Laguna Seca	Monterey, California
14	September 18–20	TBA	R WeatherTech Raceway Laguna Seca	Monterey, California
15	October 23–25	TBA	R Streets of St. Petersburg	St. Petersburg, Florida
16	October 23–25	TBA	R Streets of St. Petersburg	St. Petersburg, Florida

Cancelled events
Date	Race name	Track	Location
March 14 & 15	Never announced	R Streets of St. Petersburg	St. Petersburg, Florida
April 4 & 5	Never announced	R Barber Motorsports Park	Birmingham, Alabama
May 30 & 31	Never announced	R The Raceway at Belle Isle Park	Detroit, Michigan
July 11 & 12	Never announced	R Exhibition Place	Toronto, Ontario, Canada

== See also ==
- 2020 IndyCar Series
- 2020 Indy Pro 2000 Championship
- 2020 U.S. F2000 National Championship
