= Augie Pabst III =

American racing driver

- Nationality: (United States) American
- Born: August Uihlein Pabst III
- Wins: 0
- Poles: 0
- Fastest laps: 0

August Uihlein Pabst III is a former racing driver and current team owner of Pabst Racing. He is also the great-great grandson of Frederick Pabst, founder of the Pabst Brewing Company, and the great-great grandson of August Uihlein of Joseph Schlitz Brewing Company.

== Racing career ==
Augie was born into a racing family. His father, Augie Pabst, won the SCCA National Sports Car Championship in the B Modified class in 1960.

Pabst started his auto racing career in Sports Car Club of America in 1991. After racing in Formula Ford, Pabst started in the Shelby Can-Am class. The driver from Oconomowoc, Wisconsin won the 1995 Cen-Div Division National championship in the amateur Shelby Can-Am class. and placed second in the Dodge Pro Series. The following year, Pabst competed in the Formula Continental class placing nineteenth in the Cen-Div National championship.

In 1997, Pabst competed his last season in the United States Formula Ford 2000 National Championship. Racing a Van Diemen chassis, Pabst scored various top-ten finishes placing thirteenth in the championship standings.

== Racing management ==
In 1998, Pabst took over Pabst Racing Services expanding the race team. Pabst focused on the servicing of a variety of race cars for clients. The team was most dedicated to their USF2000 entry. Tõnis Kasemets was one of the drivers successful for the Pabst team winning races in the series. In 2005, Pabst was the crew chief for Kasemets in the Atlantic Championship. Kasemets entered his own team, Team Tonis, which was technically supported by Pabst Racing Services.

Pabst Racing is a four-time U.S. F2000 National Championship team champion (2017–19, 2022), and fields teams at the USF2000 and USF Pro 2000 levels.

== Racing record ==
=== SCCA National Championship Runoffs ===
Year	Track	Car	Engine	Class	Finish	Start	Status
1992	Road Atlanta	Shelby Can-Am	Dodge	Shelby Can-Am	12	3	Retired
1992	Mid-Ohio	Shelby Can-Am	Dodge	Shelby Can-Am	2	2	Running

=== American Open-Wheel racing results ===
(key) (Races in bold indicate pole position, races in italics indicate fastest race lap)

==== Complete USF2000 National Championship results ====
Year	Entrant	1	2	3	4	5	6	7	8	9	10	11	12	Pos	Points
1996		WDW; 23	STP; 7	PIR; 22	DSC1; 37	MOS; 42	IRP; 22	RIR	WGI1; 14	WGI2; 13	MOH; 19	NHS	LVS; 31	**30th**	**35**
1997	Pabst Racing Services	WDW; 21	STP; 6	PIR; 17	DSC1; 7	DSC2; 14	SAV; 13	PPI; 27	CHA1; 13	CHA2; 7	MOH; 14	WGI; 12	WGI; 10	**13th**	**98**
