= Reece Gold =

American racing driver (born 2002)

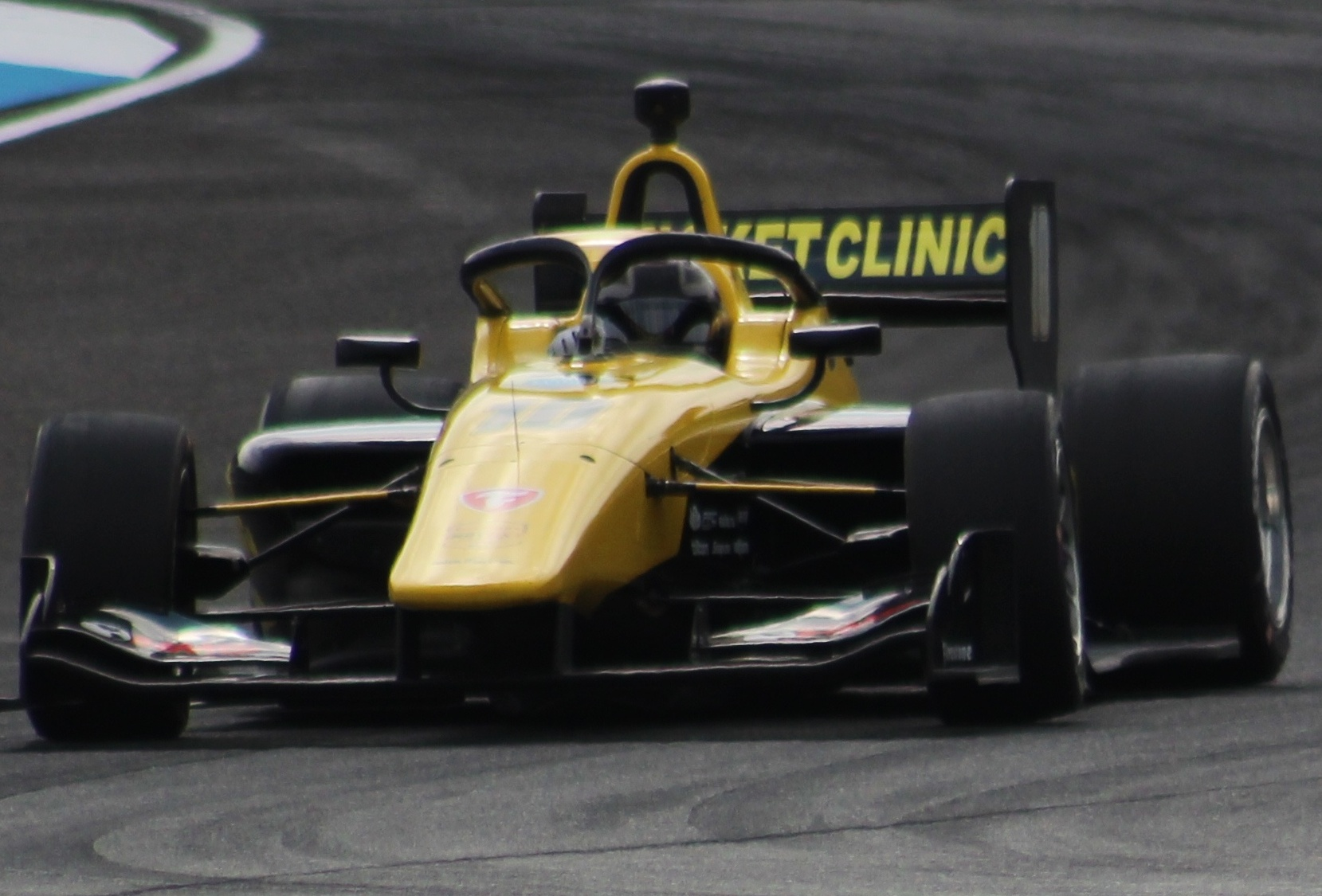
- Gold in 2023
- Nationality: (United States) American
- Born: September 2, 2002 (age 24) Miami, Florida, United States

European Le Mans Series career
- Debut season: 2025
- Current team: Inter Europol Competition
- Categorisation: FIA Silver
- Car number: 88
- Starts: 6 (6 entries)
- Wins: 0
- Podiums: 2
- Poles: 0
- Fastest laps: 0

Previous series
- 2023–24 2021–22 2019–20 2019: Indy NXT; Indy Pro 2000 Championship; U.S. F2000 National Championship; F4 USA Championship

Championship titles
- 2018: Lucas Oil Formula Car Race Series

Reece Gold (born September 2, 2002) is an American racing driver who last competed in the European Le Mans Series in LMP3 driving for Inter Europol Competition. He previously competed in Indy NXT driving for HMD Motorsports with Dale Coyne Racing.

== Junior career ==
=== USF2000 Championship ===
On January 29, 2019, it was announced that Gold would move up to the USF2000 Championship in 2019 with Cape Motorsports after winning the Lucas Oil Formula Car Race Series and a $100,000 scholarship in 2018. He would finish tenth in the championship that year.

Gold would return to the championship with Cape Motorsports the following season. At the ninth round of the season at the Indianapolis Motor Speedway, he would get his maiden win of the season. He managed to get his first pole and get his second win at the fifth Mid-Ohio race. Gold finished the season with two wins, one pole, and ten podiums to end third in the standings.

=== Indy Pro 2000 ===
On October 23, 2020, it was announced that Gold would move up to the Indy Pro 2000 Championship with Juncos Racing for the 2021 season. He would get his maiden win of the season at the third race at New Jersey Motorsports Park.

Gold would return to the championship in 2022 once again with Juncos Hollinger Racing. He had a breakout season battling for the championship with rookie Louis Foster, however he would finish second behind Foster.

=== Indy NXT ===
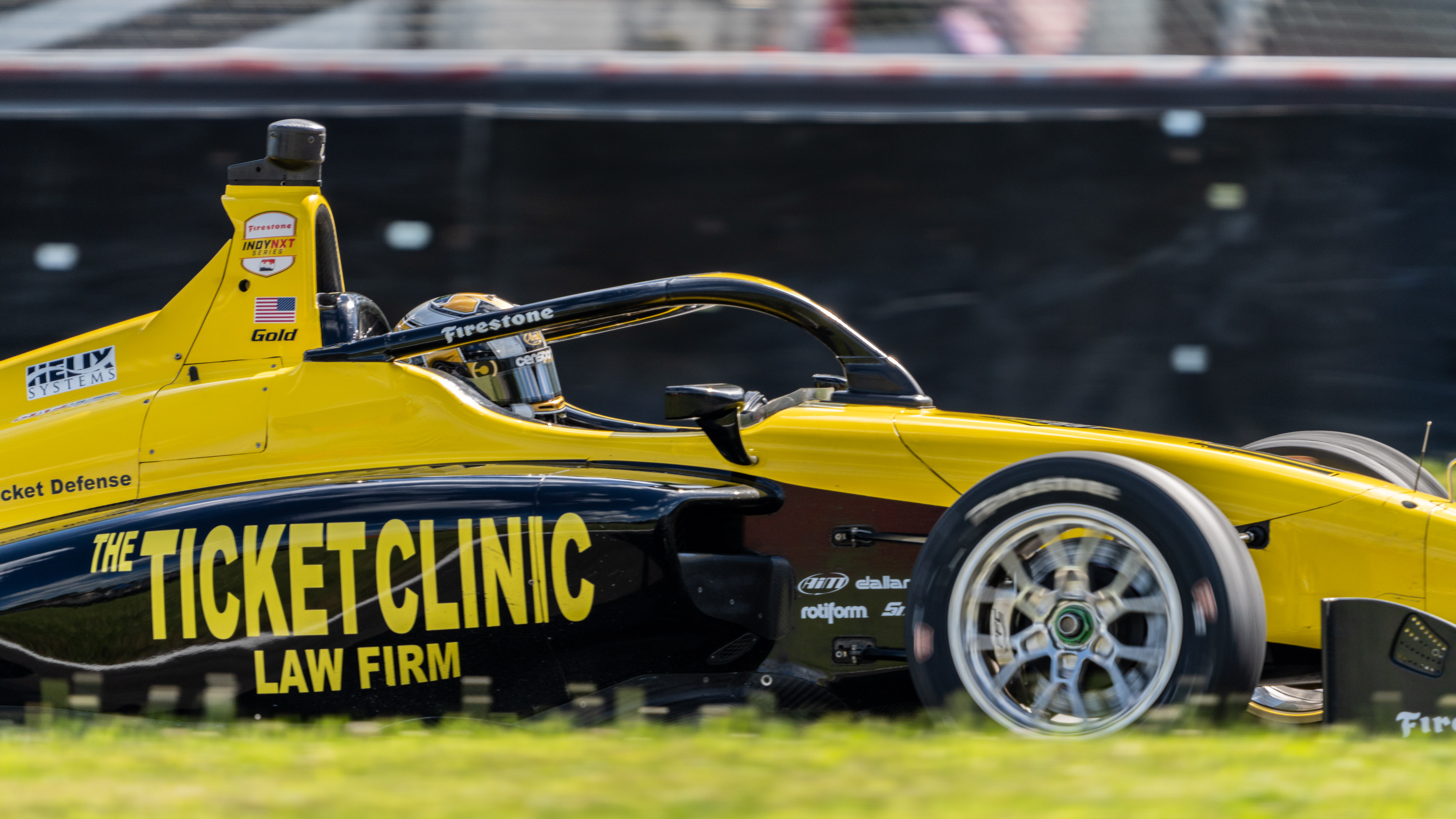
Gold's 2024 Indy NXT car at Mid-Ohio Sports Car Course

At the end of 2022, Gold announced that he would move up to the 2023 Indy NXT driving for Juncos Hollinger Racing. On May 5, 2023, it was announced that Gold would switch teams mid-season to HMD Motorsports. At the first race at the Detroit round, Gold would get his first win in dramatic fashion after leader Nolan Siegel would encounter mechanical issues on the final lap of the race.

== Sportscar racing career ==
Following his 2024 Indy NXT season, Gold made the switch to sportscar racing and signed with Inter Europol Competition to compete in the 2025 European Le Mans Series in LMP3.

== Racing record ==
=== Career summary ===
Season	Series	Team	Races	Wins	Poles	F/Laps	Podiums	Points	Position
2018	Lucas Oil Formula Car Race Series	N/A	16	5	7	4	13	484	**1st**
2019	Formula 4 United States Championship	DC Autosport with Cape Motorsports	5	0	0	0	0	12	18th
2019	U.S. F2000 National Championship	Cape Motorsports	15	0	0	0	0	167	10th
2019-20	NACAM Formula 4 Championship	Scuderia Martiga EG	3	0	0	0	1	38	14th
2020	U.S. F2000 National Championship	Cape Motorsports	17	2	1	3	10	341	**3rd**
2021	Indy Pro 2000 Championship	Juncos Hollinger Racing	18	1	5	3	7	366	5th
2022	Indy Pro 2000 Championship	Juncos Hollinger Racing	18	4	5	2	7	390	**2nd**
2023	Indy NXT	Juncos Hollinger Racing	2	0	0	0	0	334	8th
2023	Indy NXT	HMD Motorsports with Dale Coyne Racing	12	1	0	0	2	334	8th
2024	Indy NXT	HMD Motorsports	13	0	0	1	0	289	10th
2025	European Le Mans Series - LMP3	Inter Europol Competition	6	0	0	1	2	66	**3rd**
2025	GT World Challenge Europe Endurance Cup	Saintéloc Racing	4	0	0	0	0	0	NC

* Season still in progress.

=== American open-wheel racing results ===
==== Complete Lucas Oil Formula Car Race Series results ====
(key) (Races in bold indicate pole position) (Races in italics indicate fastest lap)

Year	Team	1	2	3	4	5	6	7	8	9	10	11	12	13	14	15	16	Pos	Points
2018	N/A	PAL; 1; 2	PAL; 2; 5	ACC; 1; 3	ACC; 2 DNF	**NOL**; **1**; 1	**NOL**; **2**; 2	**TSM**; **1**; 1	**TSM**; **2**; 2	**NCM**; **1**; 1	NCM; 2; 1	**ROA**; **1**; 2	ROA; 2; 2	MOH; 1; 2	MOH; 2; 1	**SEB**; **1**; 2	SEB; 2; 5	1st	484

==== Formula 4 United States Championship ====
Year	Team	1	2	3	4	5	6	7	8	9	10	11	12	13	14	15	16	17	Rank	Points
2019	DC Autosport with Cape Motorsports	ATL; 1	ATL; 2	ATL; 3	PIT; 1	PIT; 2	PIT; 3	VIR; 1	VIR; 2	VIR; 3	MOH; 1	MOH; 2	MOH; 3	SEB; 1; 6	SEB; 2 Ret	SEB; 3; 16	COA; 1; 12	COA; 2; 8	18th	12

==== U.S. F2000 National Championship ====
(key) (Races in bold indicate pole position) (Races in italics indicate fastest lap) (Races with * indicate most race laps led)

Year	Team	1	2	3	4	5	6	7	8	9	10	11	12	13	14	15	16	17	Rank	Points
2019	Cape Motorsports	STP; 1; 10	STP; 2; 8	IMS; 1; 14	IMS; 2; 12	LOR; 8	ROA; 1; 8	ROA; 2; 10	TOR; 1; 13	TOR; 2; 9	MOH; 1; 12	MOH; 2; 9	POR; 1; 12	POR; 2; 11	LAG; 1; 11	LAG; 2; 8			10th	167
2020	Cape Motorsports	ROA; 1; 19	ROA; 2; 7	MOH; 1; 3	MOH; 2; 2	MOH; 3; 3	LOR; 2	IMS; 1; 2	IMS; 2; 7	IMS; 3; 1	MOH; 4; 2	**MOH**; **5**; 1*	MOH; 6; 3	NJM; 1; 15	NJM; 2; 6	NJM; 3; 9	STP; 1; 3	STP; 2; 9	3rd	341

==== Indy Pro 2000 Championship ====
(key) (Races in bold indicate pole position) (Races in italics indicate fastest lap) (Races with * indicate most race laps led)

Year	Team	1	2	3	4	5	6	7	8	9	10	11	12	13	14	15	16	17	18	Rank	Points
2021	Juncos Hollinger Racing	ALA; 1; 3	ALA; 2; 13	STP; 1; 6	STP; 2; 3	**IMS**; **1**; 3	**IMS**; **2**; 4	**IMS**; **3**; 2	**LOR**; 2*	ROA; 1; 5	ROA; 2; 2	MOH; 1; 6	MOH; 2; 4	GMP; 8	**NJM**; **1**; 1	NJM; 2; 4	NJM; 3; 10	MOH; 3; 4	MOH; 4; 11	5th	366
2022	Juncos Hollinger Racing	STP; 1; 7	STP; 2; 10	**ALA**; **1**; 1*	ALA; 2; 5	IMS; 1; 4	IMS; 2; 1*	IMS; 3; 15	**IRP**; 2*	**ROA**; **1**; 6	ROA; 2; 5	MOH; 1; 7	MOH; 2; 6	TOR; 1; 4	TOR; 2; 2	GMP; 6	POR; 1; 2	**POR**; **2**; 1*	**POR**; **3**; 1*	2nd	390

==== Indy NXT ====
(key) (Races in bold indicate pole position) (Races in italics indicate fastest lap) (Races with ^{L} indicate a race lap led) (Races with * indicate most race laps led)

Year	Team	1	2	3	4	5	6	7	8	9	10	11	12	13	14	Rank	Points
2023	Juncos Hollinger Racing	STP; 8	BAR; 17													8th	334
2023	HMD Motorsports with Dale Coyne Racing			IMS; 16	DET; 1^{L*}	DET; 12	RDA; 4^{L}	MOH; 5	IOW; 12	NSH; 9	IMS; 3	GMP; 9	POR; 14	LAG; 10	LAG; 14	8th	334
2024	HMD Motorsports	STP; 5	BAR; 11	IMS; 6	IMS; 11	DET; 6	RDA; 4	LAG; 14	LAG; 18	MOH; 6	IOW; 12	GMP; 12	POR; 6	MIL; 17	NSH	10th	289

=== Complete European Le Mans Series results ===
(key) (Races in bold indicate pole position; results in italics indicate fastest lap)

Year	Entrant	Class	Chassis	Engine	1	2	3	4	5	6	Rank	Points
2025	Inter Europol Competition	LMP3	Ligier JS P325	Toyota V35A-FTS 3.5 L V6	CAT; 3	LEC; 4	IMO; 7	SPA; 3	SIL; 5	ALG; 6	3rd	66
