= 2022 Indy Pro 2000 Championship =

Racing season

The 2022 Indy Pro 2000 Championship was the 24th season in series history, and the fourth and final season held under the Indy Pro 2000 moniker. It served as the second rung of the Road to Indy ladder system, with the winner earning an Indy Lights scholarship for the following season. Rookie Louis Foster won the Drivers' championship, while Juncos Hollinger Racing won their fifth Teams' championship.

== Drivers and teams ==
All drivers competed using Tatuus-built racecars, with the halo safety device being incorporated for the first time in 2022.

Team	No.	Driver(s)	Round(s)
DEForce Racing	1	(Brazil) Kiko Porto	All
DEForce Racing	7	(United States) Bijoy Garg	15–18
DEForce Racing	8	(United States) Nolan Siegel	All
Exclusive Autosport	90	(United Kingdom) Louis Foster	All
Exclusive Autosport	91	(United States) Christian Brooks	1–2
Exclusive Autosport	92	(United Kingdom) Matthew Round-Garrido	1–2
Exclusive Autosport	92	(United States) Wyatt Brichacek	9–14, 16–18
Exclusive Autosport	93	(United States) Lindsay Brewer	5–7, 9–10, 13–18
FatBoy Racing!	83	(United States) Charles Finelli	3–10
Jay Howard Driver Development	4	(United States) Braden Eves	All
Jay Howard Driver Development	5	(United States) Wyatt Brichacek	1–8
Jay Howard Driver Development	5	(Australia) Marcos Flack	15–18
Jay Howard Driver Development	6	(Mexico) Salvador de Alba	All
Juncos Hollinger Racing	47	(Pakistan) Enaam Ahmed	All
Juncos Hollinger Racing	55	(United States) Reece Gold	All
Miller Vinatieri Motorsport	40	(United States) Jack William Miller	All
Pabst Racing	18	(United States) Yuven Sundaramoorthy	All
Pabst Racing	19	(United States) Jordan Missig	All
Pabst Racing	27	(United States) Colin Kaminsky	1–10
Turn 3 Motorsport	2	(Republic of Ireland) Jonathan Browne	1–14, 16–18
Turn 3 Motorsport	2	(United States) Trey Burke	15
Turn 3 Motorsport	3	(United States) Josh Green	All

- Casey Putsch was signed to compete with Legacy Autosport, but neither team nor driver entered any rounds.

== Schedule ==
The schedule was announced on October 5, 2021, and featured two street courses, five road courses and two ovals.

Rd.	Date	Race name	Track	Location
1	February 26–27	Andersen Interior Contracting Grand Prix of St. Petersburg	R Streets of St. Petersburg	St. Petersburg, Florida
2	February 26–27	Andersen Interior Contracting Grand Prix of St. Petersburg	R Streets of St. Petersburg	St. Petersburg, Florida
3	April 30 – May 1	Andersen Interior Contracting Grand Prix of Alabama	R Barber Motorsports Park	Birmingham, Alabama
4	April 30 – May 1	Andersen Interior Contracting Grand Prix of Alabama	R Barber Motorsports Park	Birmingham, Alabama
5	May 13–14	Cooper Tires Grand Prix of Indianapolis supporting Indycar Ministry	R Indianapolis Motor Speedway Road Course	Speedway, Indiana
6	May 13–14	Cooper Tires Grand Prix of Indianapolis supporting Indycar Ministry	R Indianapolis Motor Speedway Road Course	Speedway, Indiana
7	May 13–14	Cooper Tires Grand Prix of Indianapolis supporting Indycar Ministry	R Indianapolis Motor Speedway Road Course	Speedway, Indiana
8	May 27	Cooper Tires Freedom 90	O Lucas Oil Raceway	Brownsburg, Indiana
9	June 11–12	Cooper Tires Indy Pro 2000 Grand Prix Powered by Elite Engines	R Road America	Elkhart Lake, Wisconsin
10	June 11–12	Cooper Tires Indy Pro 2000 Grand Prix Powered by Elite Engines	R Road America	Elkhart Lake, Wisconsin
11	July 2–3	Cooper Tires Indy Pro 2000 Grand Prix of Mid-Ohio	R Mid-Ohio Sports Car Course	Lexington, Ohio
12	July 2–3	Cooper Tires Indy Pro 2000 Grand Prix of Mid-Ohio	R Mid-Ohio Sports Car Course	Lexington, Ohio
13	July 16–17	L&W Supply Grand Prix of Toronto	R Exhibition Place	Toronto, Ontario, Canada
14	July 16–17	L&W Supply Grand Prix of Toronto	R Exhibition Place	Toronto, Ontario, Canada
15	August 20	Cooper Tires Indy Pro 2000 Oval Challenge of St. Louis	O World Wide Technology Raceway	Madison, Illinois
16	September 2–4	Cooper Tires Indy Pro 2000 Grand Prix of Portland	R Portland International Raceway	Portland, Oregon
17	September 2–4	Cooper Tires Indy Pro 2000 Grand Prix of Portland	R Portland International Raceway	Portland, Oregon
18	September 2–4	Cooper Tires Indy Pro 2000 Grand Prix of Portland	R Portland International Raceway	Portland, Oregon

== Race results ==
Round		Circuit	Pole position	Fastest lap	Most laps led	Race Winner	
Round		Circuit	Pole position	Fastest lap	Most laps led	Driver	Team
1	R1	(United States) Streets of St. Petersburg	(United States) Josh Green	(United States) Nolan Siegel	(United States) Josh Green	(United States) Josh Green	Turn 3 Motorsport
2	R2	(United States) Streets of St. Petersburg	(United States) Nolan Siegel	(United Kingdom) Louis Foster	(United States) Nolan Siegel	(United States) Nolan Siegel	DEForce Racing
3	R1	(United States) Barber Motorsports Park	(United States) Reece Gold	(United Kingdom) Louis Foster	(United States) Reece Gold	(United States) Reece Gold	Juncos Hollinger Racing
4	R2	(United States) Barber Motorsports Park	(United States) Nolan Siegel	(United Kingdom) Louis Foster	(United States) Nolan Siegel	(United States) Nolan Siegel	DEForce Racing
5	R1	(United States) Indianapolis Motor Speedway Road Course	(Republic of Ireland) Jonathan Browne	(United States) Wyatt Brichacek	(Mexico) Salvador de Alba Jr.	(Mexico) Salvador de Alba Jr.	Jay Howard Driver Development
6	R2	(United States) Indianapolis Motor Speedway Road Course	(United States) Jack William Miller	(United Kingdom) Louis Foster	(United States) Reece Gold	(United States) Reece Gold	Juncos Hollinger Racing
7	R3	(United States) Indianapolis Motor Speedway Road Course	(United States) Jack William Miller	(United States) Wyatt Brichacek	(United Kingdom) Louis Foster	(United Kingdom) Louis Foster	Exclusive Autosport
8		(United States) Indianapolis Raceway Park	(United States) Reece Gold	(United Kingdom) Louis Foster	(United States) Reece Gold	(United Kingdom) Louis Foster	Exclusive Autosport
9	R1	(United States) Road America	(United States) Reece Gold	(United States) Reece Gold	(United Kingdom) Louis Foster	(United Kingdom) Louis Foster	Exclusive Autosport
10	R2	(United States) Road America	(United States) Josh Green	(United States) Jack William Miller	(United States) Braden Eves	(United States) Braden Eves	Jay Howard Driver Development
11	R1	(United States) Mid-Ohio Sports Car Course	(United Kingdom) Louis Foster	(United Kingdom) Louis Foster	(United Kingdom) Louis Foster	(United Kingdom) Louis Foster	Exclusive Autosport
12	R2	(United States) Mid-Ohio Sports Car Course	(United Kingdom) Louis Foster	(Mexico) Salvador de Alba Jr.	(Brazil) Kiko Porto	(Brazil) Kiko Porto	DEForce Racing
13	R1	(Canada) Exhibition Place	(United Kingdom) Louis Foster	(United Kingdom) Louis Foster	(United Kingdom) Louis Foster	(United Kingdom) Louis Foster	Exclusive Autosport
14	R2	(Canada) Exhibition Place	(United Kingdom) Louis Foster	(United Kingdom) Louis Foster	(United Kingdom) Louis Foster	(United Kingdom) Louis Foster	Exclusive Autosport
15		(United States) World Wide Technology Raceway	(Mexico) Salvador de Alba Jr.	(Mexico) Salvador de Alba Jr.	(Mexico) Salvador de Alba Jr.	(Mexico) Salvador de Alba Jr.	Jay Howard Driver Development
16	R1	(United States) Portland International Raceway	(United Kingdom) Louis Foster	(United States) Reece Gold	(United Kingdom) Louis Foster	(United Kingdom) Louis Foster	Exclusive Autosport
17	R2	(United States) Portland International Raceway	(United States) Reece Gold	(United Kingdom) Louis Foster	(United States) Reece Gold	(United States) Reece Gold	Juncos Hollinger Racing
18	R3	(United States) Portland International Raceway	(United States) Reece Gold	(United Kingdom) Louis Foster	(United States) Reece Gold	(United States) Reece Gold	Juncos Hollinger Racing

== Season review ==
=== First half ===
The fourth Indy Pro 2000 season began with its traditional two rounds on the Streets of St. Petersburg. Josh Green led the field to green after earning the first pole position of the year, quickly creating a gap back to Enaam Ahmed in second and Louis Foster in third. Ahmed worked hard to reduce the gap to Green in the second half of the race, but the latter held on to win on his debut. A day later, it was Nolan Siegel's time to shine. He led from pole, ahead of Wyatt Brichacek and Ahmed, the latter getting overtaken by Braden Eves at the start. Two cautions and subsequent restarts, first for a collision between Salvador de Alba and Reece Gold and then for Ahmed colliding with the wall, helped Foster to rise to second ahead of Eves, but Siegel remained in the lead to win. He left St. Petersburg as the championship leader, two points ahead of Foster.

The championship then headed to Barber Motorsports Park in Alabama, with Gold securing pole for the first race. He led from start to finish, remaining unchallenged throughout a caution-free race, with the only incident being a collision between de Alba and Jack William Miller. Colin Kaminsky came second, ahead of Ahmed and Foster. Siegel claimed pole for race two, leading Eves, while Foster gained three places at the start, rising from sixth to third. He pressured Eves all race long, but the latter remained mistake-free throughout another race without any yellow flags. Siegel became the season's first repeat winner, keeping his championship lead ahead of Foster.

Next up was the Indianapolis Motor Speedway, with a triple-header held on the road course. The weekend started in chaotic fashion when surprise polesitter Jonathan Browne locked up in turn one, producing a slide which collected Foster and Miller, retiring both cars. Eves rose from tenth to second among the chaos, so became the race leader when Browne had to serve a penalty for the incident. He went on to finish first, but was later disqualified in the post-race technical inspection. This promoted de Alba to his first win, ahead of Yuven Sundaramoorthy and Kaminsky. The second race was also filled with incidents, between polesitter Miller and Foster on lap one, the latter receiving a penalty, as well as incidents affecting Jordan Missig, Ahmed and Eves. Gold, who started in fourth, kept his nose clean to eventually win, leading home Kaminsky and Siegel. The final race of the weekend saw Miller start from pole again, with Foster cleanly overtaking him for the lead this time. A caution brought the field back together and led to multiple changes in the order, but Foster held on for his first win, ahead of Eves and Miller. Siegel's relative consistency kept him in the championship lead by a three-point margin, ahead of Foster.

The first oval race of the season was held at Indianapolis Raceway Park. Gold qualified on pole, leading his Juncos teammate Ahmed. Foster started third and began pressuring Ahmed right from the start, with the pass for second coming 45 laps into the race. He then overtook Gold two laps later and built a gap, which was nullified by a caution as Kaminsky brushed the wall. Foster was unchallenged at the restart and led home Gold and Green. This win also earned him the championship lead, 14 points clear of Gold.

The halfway point of the season came at Road America, where Foster continued his run of form. He started the first race in third, but as polesitter Gold ran wide on the first lap, Foster managed to gain the lead. He quickly took off after a brief caution and remained unchallenged until the end. Second place was contested between Eves, de Alba and Green, with the latter eventually succeeding. Ahmed started second, then slipped away at the start and came back to eventually finish third. The second race of the weekend saw Green start from pole, with Eves pressuring and eventually passing him. Miller started seventh, but rose quickly enough to also pass Green and begin attacking Eves, albeit without success. Third place was hotly contested all through the race, with de Alba eventually clinching it. Foster's run came to a sudden end, as an error saw him finish thirteenth. He still remained in the championship lead, though, 19 points ahead of Gold.

=== Second half ===
Foster was back on form in Mid-Ohio, earning pole for both races. He braced two caution periods in the first race as Sundaramoorthy and Browne retired, but no one could stop him. De Alba rose from fifith to third at the start and eventually passed Siegel for second. In the end, Foster was over 14 seconds clear from de Alba and Siegel. The second race was a different story, though, as Kiko Porto passed Foster into turn two on the opening lap. Porto resisted Foster's pressure for the whole race, with the gap never growing beyond a second, and held on for his first win, with Sundaramoorthy in third. Foster played it safe to finish second, boosting his championship lead to 49 points.

Teams and drivers made their return to Canada and to Exhibition Place two weeks later. Foster continued to tighten his grip on the championship, once again clinching two pole positions. Race one saw a flag-to-flag victory by the Englishman, holding of Ahmed at the start and surviving two caution restarts when Browne lost his front wing and de Alba retired. Foster led home Ahmed and Green, who bounced back after crashing in qualifying the day before. Race two started with a multi-car crash in turn one involving five cars and ending Green's race. On the restart, a second caution was immediately called as Browne spun and took out himself as well as Siegel. Foster controlled the second restart and the rest of the race, finishing ahead of Gold in second and Sundaramoorthy, both profiting from a post-race penalty for Missig. Foster took a maximum of 66 points in Toronto and now lead the standings by 63 points, from Gold and Siegel.

The second oval race of the season came next, at World Wide Technology Raceway in St. Louis. De Alba dominated proceedings, leading all test sessions and then qualifying to start from pole. Siegel started fourth and gained to places on the opening lap. The battle for second place then grew to a four-car fight, with Green, Eves and Foster battling it out. In the end, de Alba won in dominating fashion, Siegel managed to hold on to second, and Eves was third after Green ran wide with ten laps remaining. Foster came fourth, further cementing his championship lead, now 77 points ahead of Gold.

The season ended at Portland International Raceway, where Foster once again claimed the first pole position of the weekend. He was challenged by Gold in the opening part of race one, but remained in first place as an incident between Siegel, Porto and Miller promoted Ahmed to third behind the leading pair. Behind him was Marcos Flack, who surprised in just his second race by jumping from 16th on the grid to fourth place in the span of a single lap. Foster's seventh win of the season earned him the championship. Race two saw Gold lead from pole and dominate the race, as Porto slotted into second ahead of Foster at the start. Foster was still battling for second despite having already sealed the championship, and eventually passed Porto, but Gold had pulled out a gap to the rest of the field by then and won the race. The last race of the season saw Gold secure second place in the championship with another win, ahead of Porto and Siegel, who held second and third for the entirety of the race. Ahmed came fourth, thereby securing third place in the standings, just five points ahead of Siegel.

== Championship standings ==
=== Drivers' Championship ===
Scoring system

Position	**1st**	**2nd**	**3rd**	**4th**	**5th**	**6th**	**7th**	**8th**	**9th**	**10th**	**11th**	**12th**	**13th**	**14th**	**15th**	**16th**	**17th**	**18th**	**19th**	**20th**
Points	30	25	22	19	17	15	14	13	12	11	10	9	8	7	6	5	4	3	2	1
Points (O)	45	38	33	29	26	23	21	20	18	17	15	14	12	11	9	8	6	5	3	2

- The driver who qualified on pole is awarded one additional point.
- One point was awarded to the driver who leads the most laps in a race.
- One point was awarded to the driver who sets the fastest lap during the race.

Pos	Driver	STP		ALA		IMS			IRP	ROA		MOH		TOR		GMP	POR			Points
1	(United Kingdom) Louis Foster	3	2	4	3	14	13	1*	1	1*	13	**1***	**2**	**1***	**1***	4	**1***	2	6	451
2	(United States) Reece Gold	7	10	**1***	5	4	1*	15	**2***	**6**	5	7	6	4	2	6	2	**1***	**1***	390
3	(Pakistan) Enaam Ahmed	2	13	3	4	5	15	5	4	3	4	6	4	2	7	7	3	4	4	338
4	(United States) Nolan Siegel	5	**1***	7	**1***	13	3	6	5	11	7	3	7	5	12	2	14	8	3	333
5	(United States) Braden Eves	4	3	5	2	DSQ	9	2	11	5	1*	8	8	12	5	3	7	9	11	304
6	(United States) Josh Green	**1***	11	6	6	11	11	7	3	2	**6**	5	9	3	13	5	9	13	8	298
7	(Brazil) Kiko Porto	6	4	8	7	6	4	8	7	14	12	4	1*	9	6	11	15	3	2	290
8	(Mexico) Salvador de Alba	9	15	15	8	1*	6	16	8	4	3	2	5	14	DNS	**1***	8	6	7	289
9	(United States) Jack William Miller	8	6	13	10	15	**5**	**3**	9	13	2	10	12	8	4	14	13	5	5	251
10	(United States) Yuven Sundaramoorthy	11	7	12	11	2	8	12	12	10	8	13	3	6	3	9	11	11	10	244
11	(United States) Jordan Missig	12	8	9	14	7	16	11	9	9	15	11	10	7	9	DNS	6	7	9	199
12	(Republic of Ireland) Jonathan Browne	15	14	10	9	**9**	10	9	10	8	9	12	11	10	11		5	14	12	187
13	(United States) Wyatt Brichacek	13	5	11	13	10	7	4	13	15	11	9	13	11	8		Wth	Wth	Wth	160
14	(United States) Colin Kaminsky	14	12	2	12	3	2	10	14	7	10									144
15	(United States) Lindsay Brewer					8	12	13		16	14			13	10	13	12	12	14	98
16	(United States) Charles Finelli			14	15	12	14	14	15	12	16									59
17	(Australia) Marcos Flack															8	4	15	15	51
18	(United States) Bijoy Garg															10	10	10	13	47
19	(United Kingdom) Matthew Round-Garrido	10	9																	23
20	(United States) Trey Burke															12				14
—	(United States) Christian Brooks	DNS	DNS																	—
Pos	Driver	STP		ALA		IMS			IRP	ROA		MOH		TOR		GMP	POR			Points

Color	Result
Gold	Winner
Silver	2nd place
Bronze	3rd place
Green	4th & 5th place
Light Blue	6th–10th place
Dark Blue	Finished (Outside Top 10)
Purple	Did not finish
Red	Did not qualify (DNQ)
Brown	Withdrawn (Wth)
Black	Disqualified (DSQ)
White	Did not start (DNS)
Blank	Did not participate

**In-line notation**
**Bold**	Pole position (1 point)
Italics	Ran fastest race lap (1 point)
*	Led most race laps (1 point); Not awarded if more than one driver leads most laps
Rookie

=== Teams' championship ===
Scoring system

Position	**1st**	**2nd**	**3rd**	**4th**	**5th**	**6th**	**7th**	**8th**	**9th**	**10th+**
Points	22	18	15	12	10	8	6	4	2	1

- Single car teams received 3 bonus points as an equivalency to multi-car teams
- Only the best two results counted for teams fielding more than two entries

Pos	Team	STP		ALA		IMS			LOR	ROA		MOH		TOR		GMP	POR			Points
1	Juncos Hollinger Racing	2	10	1	4	4	1	5	2	3	4	6	4	2	2	6	2	1	1	419
1	Juncos Hollinger Racing	7	12	3	5	5	14	14	4	6	5	7	6	4	7	7	3	4	4	419
2	Jay Howard Driver Development	4	3	5	2	1	6	2	8	4	1	2	5	12	5	1	4	6	7	324
2	Jay Howard Driver Development	9	5	11	8	9	7	4	11	5	3	8	8	13	DNS	3	7	9	11	324
3	DEForce Racing	5	1	7	1	6	3	6	5	10	7	3	1	5	6	2	9	3	2	314
3	DEForce Racing	6	4	8	7	12	4	8	7	13	12	4	7	9	11	9	13	8	3	314
4	Exclusive Autosport	3	2	4	3	7	11	1	1	1	11	1	2	1	1	4	1	2	6	307
4	Exclusive Autosport	10	9			13	12	12		14	13	9	13	11	8	11	11	11	13	307
5	Pabst Racing	11	7	2	11	2	2	10	6	7	8	11	3	6	3	8	6	7	9	185
5	Pabst Racing	12	8	9	12	3	8	11	12	9	10	13	10	7	9	DNS	10	10	10	185
6	Turn 3 Motorsport	1	11	6	6	8	9	7	3	2	6	5	9	3	10	5	5	12	8	172
6	Turn 3 Motorsport	13	13	10	9	10	10	9	10	8	9	12	11	10	12	10	8	13	12	172
7	Miller Vinatieri Motorsport	8	6	12	10	14	5	3	9	12	2	10	12	8	4	12	12	5	5	155
8	FatBoy Racing!			13	13	11	13	13	13	11	14									32
Pos	Team	STP		ALA		IMS			LOR	ROA		MOH		TOR		GMP	POR			Points

== See also ==
- 2022 IndyCar Series
- 2022 Indy Lights
- 2022 U.S. F2000 National Championship
- 2022 USF Juniors
