= 2024 Indy NXT =

Indy NXT season

2024 Indy NXT season
- Firestone Indy NXT Series

Season
- Races: 14
- Start date: March 10
- End date: September 15

Awards
- Drivers' champion: (United Kingdom) Louis Foster
- Teams' champion: (United States) Andretti Global
- Rookie of the Year: (Brazil) Caio Collet

The 2024 Firestone Indy NXT Series was the 37th season of the Indy NXT open wheel auto racing series and the 22nd sanctioned by IndyCar, acting as the primary support series for the IndyCar Series. This was the second year of the championship running under the Indy NXT moniker following its acquisition by Penske Entertainment, the owner of the IndyCar Series, in 2022.

Louis Foster, driving for Andretti Global, won the championship at the penultimate race while taking his seventh race win of the season. His team also won the Teams' Championship, while HMD Motorsports driver Caio Collet won Rookie of the Year honors at the same race.

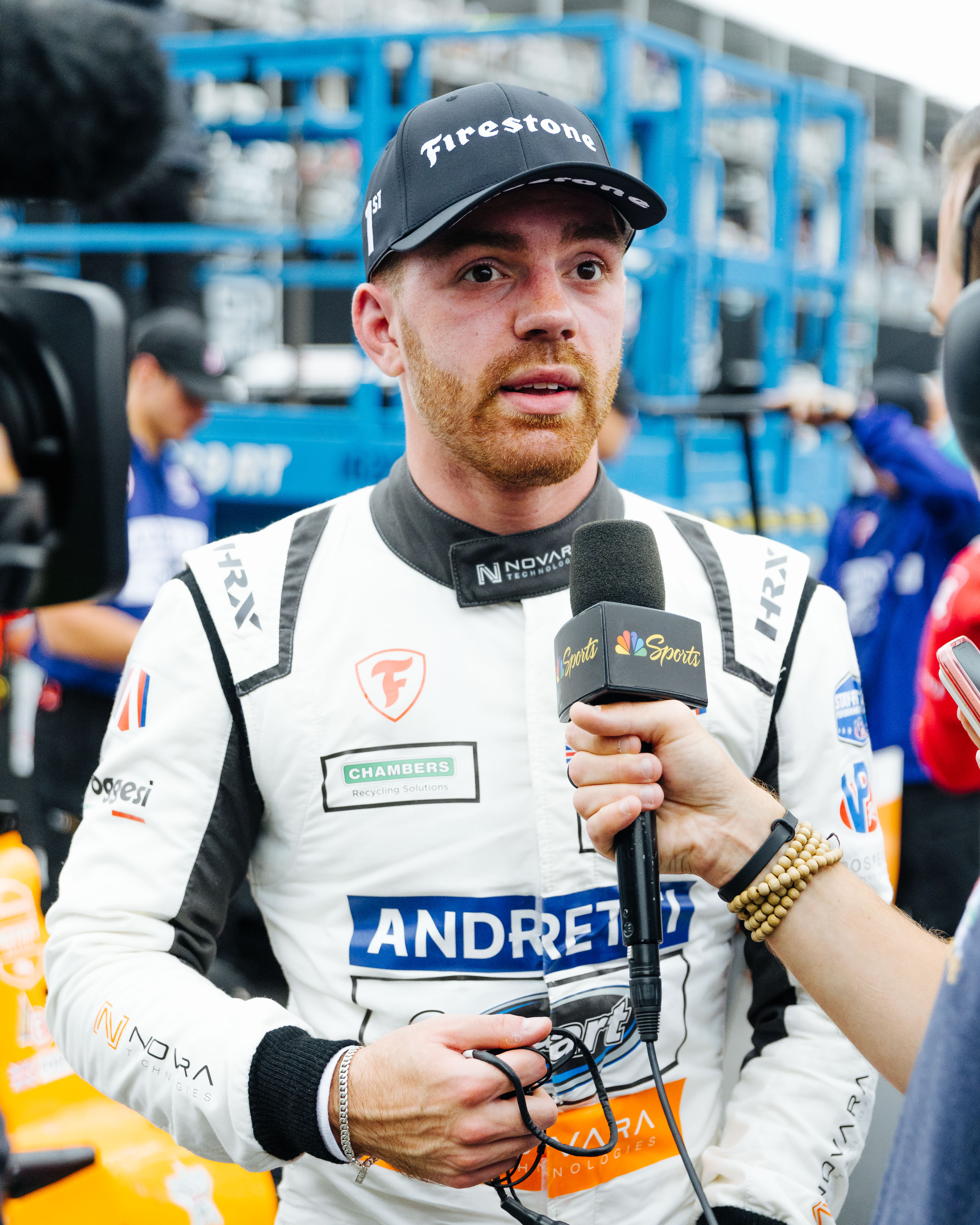
Louis Foster of Andretti Global won the championship in his second season of Indy NXT

== Series news ==
- Indy NXT saw a revised qualifying procedure introduced for 2024. After the whole field previously had only eight minutes to set a time to form the grid, drivers were now split into two groups based on their practice times, with each group getting the track to themselves. The drivers of the faster group started from the odd-numbered grid spots, with the other group in the even-numbered spots. On double-header weekends, the fastest two laps of each driver were taken to form both races' grids.

== Teams and drivers ==
All teams used Dallara IL-15 cars with an AER produced Mazda sourced 2.0 litre engine and Firestone tires. The following drivers and teams competed in the series.

Team	No.	Drivers	Status	Round(s)
Abel Motorsports	21	(United Kingdom) Josh Mason	R	1–2
Abel Motorsports	21	(United States) Jordan Missig	R	3–4, 6, 9, 11
Abel Motorsports	22	(United States) Yuven Sundaramoorthy	R	All
Abel Motorsports	51	(United States) Jacob Abel		All
Abel Motorsports	55	(United States) Taylor Ferns	R	10–11, 13–14
Andretti Global	26	(United Kingdom) Louis Foster		All
Andretti Global	27	(United States) Bryce Aron	R	All
Andretti Global	28	(United Kingdom) Jamie Chadwick		All
Andretti Global	29	(Republic of Ireland) James Roe Jr.		All
Andretti Cape Indy NXT	2	(Mexico) Salvador de Alba	R	All
Andretti Cape Indy NXT	3	(United States) Michael d'Orlando	R	1–6, 14
HMD Motorsports	7	(United States) Christian Bogle		All
HMD Motorsports	10	(United States) Reece Gold		1–13
HMD Motorsports	10	(United States) Nolan Allaer	R	14
HMD Motorsports	11	(United States) Nolan Allaer	R	1–9
HMD Motorsports	14	(United States) Josh Pierson		All
HMD Motorsports	17	(New Zealand) Callum Hedge	R	All
HMD Motorsports	18	(Brazil) Caio Collet	RY	All
HMD Motorsports	23	(Republic of Ireland) Jonathan Browne	R	All
HMD Motorsports	33	(Netherlands) Niels Koolen	R	1–8, 10
HMD Motorsports	33	(United States) Jagger Jones		9
HMD Motorsports	39	(United States) Nolan Siegel		1–6 (Note: Nolan Siegel was replaced by Kiko Porto for round 6 after opening practice as he was called up to drive the No. 78 Juncos Hollinger Racing IndyCar in place of Agustín Canapino.)
HMD Motorsports	39	(Brazil) Kiko Porto	R	6
HMD Motorsports	39	(United States) Christian Brooks	R	7–14
HMD Motorsports with Force Indy	99	(United States) Myles Rowe	R	All
Juncos Hollinger Racing	75	(Mexico) Ricardo Escotto	R	5, 7–8
Juncos Hollinger Racing	76	(United States) Lindsay Brewer	R	1–8
Juncos Hollinger Racing	76	(Mexico) Ricardo Escotto	R	12–13
Miller Vinatieri Racing	40	(United States) Jack William Miller	R	All

Icon	Status
R	Eligible for Rookie of the Year
RY	Rookie of the Year

=== Team changes ===
- On September 5, 2023, Andretti Autosport announced a rebrand that would take effect for the 2024 season, with all of its race teams running under the Andretti Global banner.
- On November 28, 2023, former IndyCar Series driver Jack Miller announced that his team Miller Vinatieri Motorsports would be joining Indy NXT in 2024.
- On January 15, 2024, Andretti Global and Cape Motorsports announced that the two teams had formed a "technical partnership" for the 2024 season, with the latter running its cars under the Andretti Cape Indy NXT guise.

=== Driver changes ===
- On September 6, 2023, reigning USF Pro 2000 champion Myles Rowe announced he would join HMD Motorsports in the No. 99 entry co-run by Force Indy. This meant Ernie Francis Jr. would leave the team.
- On September 18, 2023, Chip Ganassi Racing announced that development driver Kyffin Simpson would join the team full time in 2024. Simpson came tenth in 2023 driving for HMD Motorsports.
- On October 11, 2023, Andretti Global announced that Bryce Aron would step up from the Euroformula Open Championship to join the team in 2024.
- On October 25, 2023, Ed Carpenter Racing announced that reigning champion Christian Rasmussen would step up to the IndyCar series on a partial schedule.
- On November 20, 2023, HMD Motorsports announced Formula Regional Oceania runner-up and Formula Regional Americas champion Callum Hedge would graduate to Indy NXT and drive the No. 17 car.
- On November 28, 2023 coinciding with Miller Vinatieri Motorsports' announcement, the team confirmed that Jack William Miller would be driving the No. 40 car, graduating after three years of competing in the USF Pro 2000 Championship.
- On November 29, 2023, HMD Motorsports announced their sixth driver would be Jonathan Browne, who steps up after two years spent in the USF Pro 2000 Championship and drives the No. 23 car.
- On December 21, 2023, HMD Motorsport revealed that the eighth driver joining their squad in the No. 33 car would be Niels Koolen, who moved over from European Formula Regional competition, where his 2023 season saw him contest two championships, albeit without scoring points.
- On December 22, 2023, Juncos Hollinger Racing announced that Lindsay Brewer would be stepping up full-time to Indy NXT in 2024 after two years of competing in USF Pro 2000.
- On January 16, 2024, Andretti and Cape Motorsports announced Salvador de Alba would be driving the No. 2 car of the newly formed Andretti Cape partnership. The teams also already announced his 2025 Indy NXT campaign to be with Andretti Global.
- On January 24, 2024, SCCA National Runoffs Champion Nolan Allaer announced his graduation to Indy NXT with HMD Motorsports, jumping up from Formula Ford and F1600 competition.
- On February 7, 2024, HMD Motorsports announced the tenth and final driver of their lineup: Caio Collet joined the championship after competing in FIA Formula 3 for three years and collecting three wins over that timespan.
- On February 27, 2024, Abel Motorsports announced that it would expand to a three-car program in 2024, with former Formula 2 and Euroformula Open driver Josh Mason piloting the No. 21 car.
- On March 5, 2024, USF Pro 2000 driver Michael d'Orlando confirmed his step up to Indy NXT with Andretti Cape for the season opener at St. Petersburg. D'Orlando continued with the team on a race-by-race basis until he was forced to depart the series ahead of the Laguna Seca double-header due to budgetary issues. He later announced he would return to the championship to compete at the season finale.

==== Mid-season ====
- On March 26, 2024, Abel Motorsport announced they would enter a fourth car for the four oval events, piloted by USAC short-track driver Taylor Ferns.
- On May 2, 2024, Abel Motorsport released a statement stating Josh Mason would not drive the No. 21 car in the Indianapolis Grand Prix for budgetary reasons. Jordan Missig was named as his replacement a day later, with the American making his Indy NXT debut after spending the last three years in USF Pro 2000. Missig would also join the team for Road America, Mid-Ohio and Gateway, while Abel did not field the No. 21 car at the rest of the races.
- On May 31, 2024, Juncos Hollinger Racing announced it had signed USF Pro 2000 competitor Ricardo Escotto for a part-time schedule comprising the races at Detroit, Laguna Seca, Milwaukee and Nashville. Escotto also entered the round at Portland with the team, but was absent from Nashville.
- On June 8, 2024, HMD Motorsports announced that Nolan Siegel would withdraw from the race at Road America so he could focus on his new IndyCar duties with Juncos Hollinger Racing, replacing Agustín Canapino for the round.
  - HMD Motorsports would later announce that Kiko Porto would replace Siegel for the Road America round, making first his Indy NXT start since Laguna Seca last season.
  - On June 18, 2024, HMD Motorsports revealed that USF Pro 2000 race-winner Christian Brooks would compete for the team for the rest of the season. On the same day, IndyCar team Arrow McLaren announced it had signed Nolan Siegel on a multi-year deal that would begin at Laguna Seca.
- On June 12, 2024, HMD Motorsports announced the departure of Niels Koolen after the double-header at Laguna Seca. Jagger Jones, 13th in last years' championship, returned to the series to drive the No. 33 car at Mid-Ohio.
  - Koolen later initially confirmed he would return to see out the season with his team from Iowa onwards, but did not do so.
- On July 4, 2024, Juncos Hollinger Racing announced it had dropped Lindsay Brewer from its team due to unfulfilled contractual obligations. That meant that the team did not enter any cars at Mid-Ohio, Iowa, Gateway and Nashville.
- On July 10, 2024, HMD driver Nolan Allaer announced that he would not continue his campaign from Iowa onwards, instead electing to focus on securing his budget for 2025. Allaer would later return to contest the season finale with HMD, replacing Reece Gold, who was absent from Nashville after already withdrawing from Milwaukee because of a crash in practice.

== Schedule ==
The 2024 schedule was announced on October 4, 2023. The IMS weekend in May became a double-header again as the second IMS weekend was removed, while the Detroit weekend only held a single race. The Laguna Seca double-header was moved to June following the rescheduling of the Monterey Grand Prix. The round at Nashville became the season finale to follow the same move for the Music City Grand Prix. The championship returned to the Milwaukee Mile for the first time since 2015.

On February 14, It was announced that the Big Machine Music City Grand Prix would be moved from the downtown Streets of Nashville to the Nashville Superspeedway instead due to anticipated construction beginning on the new Tennessee Titans Stadium, which interfered with the course for the race.

Rd.	Date	Race name	Track	Location
1	March 10	Indy NXT by Firestone Grand Prix of St. Petersburg	R Streets of St. Petersburg	St. Petersburg, Florida
2	April 28	Indy NXT by Firestone Grand Prix of Alabama	R Barber Motorsports Park	Birmingham, Alabama
3	May 10	Indy NXT by Firestone Indianapolis Grand Prix	R Indianapolis Motor Speedway Road Course	Speedway, Indiana
4	May 11	Indy NXT by Firestone Indianapolis Grand Prix	R Indianapolis Motor Speedway Road Course	Speedway, Indiana
5	June 2	Indy NXT by Firestone Detroit Grand Prix	R Detroit Street Circuit	Detroit, Michigan
6	June 9	Indy NXT by Firestone Grand Prix at Road America	R Road America	Elkhart Lake, Wisconsin
7	June 22	Indy NXT by Firestone Grand Prix of Monterey	R WeatherTech Raceway Laguna Seca	Monterey, California
8	June 23	Indy NXT by Firestone Grand Prix of Monterey	R WeatherTech Raceway Laguna Seca	Monterey, California
9	July 7	Indy NXT by Firestone Grand Prix at Mid-Ohio	R Mid-Ohio Sports Car Course	Lexington, Ohio
10	July 13	Indy NXT by Firestone Iowa 100	O Iowa Speedway	Newton, Iowa
11	August 17	Indy NXT by Firestone Outfront Showdown	O World Wide Technology Raceway	Madison, Illinois
12	August 25	Indy NXT by Firestone Grand Prix of Portland	R Portland International Raceway	Portland, Oregon
13	August 31	Indy NXT by Firestone Milwaukee 100	O Milwaukee Mile	West Allis, Wisconsin
14	September 15	Indy NXT by Firestone Music City Grand Prix	O Nashville Superspeedway	Lebanon, Tennessee

Icon	Meaning
R	Road/street course
O	Oval track

== Race results ==
Rd.	Track	Pole Position	Fastest lap	Most laps led	Race winner	
Rd.	Track	Pole Position	Fastest lap	Most laps led	Driver	Team
1	Streets of St. Petersburg	(United States) Nolan Siegel	(United States) Reece Gold	(United States) Nolan Siegel	(United States) Nolan Siegel	HMD Motorsports
2	Barber Motorsports Park	(United States) Jacob Abel	(Brazil) Caio Collet	(United States) Jacob Abel	(United States) Jacob Abel	Abel Motorsports
3	Indianapolis Motor Speedway Road Course	(United States) Jacob Abel	(United States) Jacob Abel	(United States) Jacob Abel	(United States) Jacob Abel	Abel Motorsports
4	Indianapolis Motor Speedway Road Course	(United States) Jacob Abel	(United Kingdom) Louis Foster	(Brazil) Caio Collet	(United Kingdom) Louis Foster	Andretti Global
5	Detroit Street Circuit	(United Kingdom) Louis Foster	(United Kingdom) Louis Foster	(United Kingdom) Louis Foster	(United Kingdom) Louis Foster	Andretti Global
6	Road America	(United Kingdom) Jamie Chadwick	(United States) Jacob Abel	(United Kingdom) Jamie Chadwick	(United Kingdom) Jamie Chadwick	Andretti Global
7	WeatherTech Raceway Laguna Seca	(United Kingdom) Louis Foster	(United Kingdom) Louis Foster	(United Kingdom) Louis Foster	(United Kingdom) Louis Foster	Andretti Global
8	WeatherTech Raceway Laguna Seca	(United Kingdom) Louis Foster	(United Kingdom) Louis Foster	(United Kingdom) Louis Foster	(United Kingdom) Louis Foster	Andretti Global
9	Mid-Ohio Sports Car Course	(Brazil) Caio Collet	(Brazil) Caio Collet	(Brazil) Caio Collet	(Brazil) Caio Collet	HMD Motorsports
10	Iowa Speedway	(Republic of Ireland) James Roe Jr.	(Brazil) Caio Collet	(Republic of Ireland) James Roe Jr.	(United Kingdom) Louis Foster	Andretti Global
11	World Wide Technology Raceway	(United Kingdom) Louis Foster	(United Kingdom) Louis Foster	(United Kingdom) Louis Foster	(United Kingdom) Louis Foster	Andretti Global
12	Portland International Raceway	(United Kingdom) Louis Foster	(United Kingdom) Louis Foster	(United States) Jacob Abel	(United States) Jacob Abel	Abel Motorsports
13	Milwaukee Mile	(United Kingdom) Louis Foster	(United Kingdom) Louis Foster	(United Kingdom) Louis Foster	(United Kingdom) Louis Foster	Andretti Global
14	Nashville Superspeedway	(United Kingdom) Louis Foster	(United States) Jacob Abel	(United Kingdom) Louis Foster	(United Kingdom) Louis Foster	Andretti Global

== Season report ==
=== Opening rounds ===
The 2024 Indy NXT season began with 21 cars at St. Petersburg, where HMD's Nolan Siegel took pole position ahead of Abel Motorsports' Jacob Abel. Abel tried to attack Siegel at the start, but the latter was quickly able to build up a gap. Two caution periods caused by Andretti's Bryce Aron and Miller Vinatieri's Jack William Miller nullified Siegel's advantage, but he was faultless at both restarts and took the win. Andretti's Louis Foster started fourth, but quickly got by his teammate James Roe Jr. into third. He put pressure on Abel for second throughout the race, but could not find a way past him. Multiple drivers brushed walls or collided with each other, only 14 cars finished the race.

After leading both practice sessions at Barber Motorsports Park, Abel continued his pace in qualifying to take pole position. Siegel was in second in a reverse of the first round's grid. The top two remained unchanged at the start and through an early caution period called when Abel's teammate Yuven Sundaramoorthy stopped on track. The leading pair then gapped the field, with Siegel attempting moves multiple times, but unable to make them stick. Roe Jr. held off HMD's Caio Collet to come third. With a win each, Abel and Siegel were now the joint championship leaders. Foster - who overcame car problems to rise from 21st on the grid to fifth in the race - was third, 29 points behind.

Abel continued his one-lap pace at Indianapolis to take both pole positions for the double-header. Having taken his and his teams' maiden win at Mid-Ohio, Abel immediately doubled up at the next race: He made a great start, leaving Collet and Foster to fight over second, and went unchallenged until the finish. Behind him, a collision between Foster and Collet took out the Brazilian, before Siegel got involved. He made a move past Foster that broke the Brit's nose cone and forced him to pit. Two more late cautions allowed Foster to recover to seventh, while his teammate Jamie Chadwick avoided the carnage to claim third. Abel now led Siegel by 14 points, with Foster a further 44 behind.

The second race at Indianapolis began four cars wide into the first turn, with Collet taking the lead from Abel and Foster and Chadwick slotting in behind. While Collet controlled the opening part of the race, Foster began putting pressure on Abel and passed him to move into second. By the halfway point, Foster was on Collet's tail. He attacked him into turn one, ran wide and had to let off before he was able to try again, this time managing to claim the lead. Abel quickly followed past Collet, but could not trouble Foster's lead. With Siegel in fifth, Abel grew his lead to 24 points. Foster's win saw him close up his gap to the top two to 23 points.

The Detroit Street Circuit hosted round five, and Foster topped both practice sessions before taking pole position. Abel started alongside him, but lost out to Collet at the start. The narrow track soon claimed its first victims, with Foster having to manage three caution periods. Abel started struggling for pace in the second half of the race. Cape's Michael d'Orlando started pressuring him before putting on a move, causing a collision that saw Abel drop to fifth behind the HMD pair of Callum Hedge and Myles Rowe. Siegel had a technical problem that saw him start the race multiple laps behind. He finished 18th, which allowed Foster to take second in the standings, 25 points behind Abel.

=== Mid-season rounds ===
Road America was up next, where Chadwick claimed her maiden pole position. She held her lead over Foster at the start, before Abel moved into second in the first exchange of blows of a race-long battle between the championship leaders. Two caution periods followed, with Abel pressuring Chadwick at the first restart but not finding a way past. Foster then moved back into second, but was similarly unable to pass Chadwick. A late red flag set up a two-lap dash to the finish: Abel and Foster battled, leaving Chadwick to take the first Indy NXT win by a woman since Pippa Mann in 2010. Foster held off Abel in a photo finish to reduce his championship points gap to 20.

Foster claimed both pole positions for the Laguna Seca double-header. Collet started the first race in second place and seemed to have a slightly better start, but Foster exited the first turn in the lead. An early safety car caused by HMD's Reece Gold retiring in the gravel also offered no opportunity for Collet to trouble Foster. The Brit then went on to gap the field, finishing eight seconds clear. After battling Abel all race before finally getting past, Sundaramoorthy was on course to finish third before making contact with a backmarker on the final lap. He limped across the line on three wheels, allowing Abel back into third to deny Foster the championship lead, with the pair now equal on points.

The second race of the weekend proceeded in very similar fashion, as Foster's pace continued to be a step above the rest of the field. Collet started second again and remained unable to threaten Foster. A spin by Hedge caused a caution period halfway through the race, but Foster controlled the restart and went on to complete his weekend sweep. Joint championship leader Abel's race was more troubled: he started third behind Gold and fought him all race before the pair made contact to send Gold airborne. This saw Aron get into third, before Abel was handed a drive-through penalty that dropped him to eleventh. Foster's faultless weekend meant he now held a 35-point lead.

Mid-Ohio hosted round ten, and a repaving meant Collet not only took pole position, but also set a new lap record. A four-car incident interrupted the start of the race when Abel's Jordan Missig and Aron collided with Chadwick and Miller. Collet controlled both the initial start and the subsequent restart to stay clear of Foster. The only threat to his win, albeit only a slight one, came when Foster closed up to him after both had to lap a backmarker. Collet remained faultless to claim his maiden win, six seconds ahead. Foster and Abel had similarly quiet races to round out the podium, with Foster thereby extending his points lead to 40.

Iowa hosted the season's first oval race. Roe Jr. took pole position before the event was shortened by 20 laps after concerns about high tire wear arose in practice. Roe held onto his lead until the race was interrupted by a heavy crash between Collet and Rowe. The ensuing caution period lasted for almost half the race, and when racing resumed, multiple battles broke out. Roe and Foster broke away from the pack while Chadwick had to defend her third place and Abel had to retire with a flat tire. Foster managed to take the lead, while Chadwick lost out to Cape's Salvador de Alba before dropping down the order. A late caution then froze the order, with Foster growing his points lead to 77.

=== Closing rounds ===
The next race at Gateway saw Foster return to the top spot in qualifying with his first oval pole position. The first retirement of the race came before it even started when Miller collided with the cars in front as the start formation built up. The atrition continued, with the first caution already thrown after just half a lap. On the subsequent restart, Foster pulled away while Chadwick and Collet battled behind him, only to crash and cause another interruption. This saw Abel move into second, but he also had nothing in hand to fight Foster, who remained unchallenged throughout the rest of the race. Sundaramoorthy took his maiden podium in third, while Foster was now 90 points ahead of Abel.

The final road course race of 2024 at Portland saw Foster take pole position number five of the year. Abel had to outscore Foster to stay mathematically in championship contention, and seized his opportunity right at the first turn to claim the lead. A caution was then called when JHR's Ricardo Escotto rear-ended Roe Jr.'s car. That brought Foster back onto Abel's tail, but he was unable to move ahead. Foster continued pressuring Abel throughout the rest of the race, but the American drove without mistakes to stay in the lead. Aron claimed third, and the championship remained open going into the penultimate race with 79 points between Foster and Abel.

The penultimate race of the season at Milwaukee had Foster take another pole position. Foster only needed to finish inside the top six to seal his championship, but he did not put a single foot wrong all race. He controlled the start as his only rival Abel slipped down the order from alongside him, controlled a mid-race restart ahead of Chadwick and de Alba and led every lap of the race on the way to the championship title. De Alba and Chadwick were overtaken by Abel later in the race, but the American was unable to close up to Foster. He had to be content with second both in the race and in the standings as Foster now had an unsurmountable 92-point lead.

The season finale saw Indy NXT return to the Nashville Superspeedway for the first time since 2008. The qualifying session was rained off, so newly crowned champion Foster started the race from pole position. Abel was to start alongside him, but had a technical problem on the warm-up laps and had to start from the back. Collet and HMD's Christian Brooks were next in the order, but they fought among themselves and allowed Foster to stretch away. Sundaramoorthy spent the opening part rising from eleventh to second before attacking Foster on a restart after Miller and Chadwick collided. Foster was able to hold Sundaramoorty off to round out his dominant season with an eighth win.

Foster took a couple of races to bed himself into his sophomore Indy NXT season, but as soon as he started winning races, he never finished outside the top two positions. With Siegels mid-season graduation to IndyCar, the title fight quickly narrowed down to a duel between Abel and Foster, and Foster had the upper hand at almost every track. As four of the last five races were at ovals, a discipline where Abel had more experience, a resurgence for Abel seemed on the cards. But Foster silenced his doubters by winning every oval race and leading every lap at all but one of them. The Indy NXT series continued its growth, with 21 cars competing at the opening five rounds, a car count last seen in 2009.

== Championship standings ==
=== Drivers' Championship ===
Scoring system

Position	**1st**	**2nd**	**3rd**	**4th**	**5th**	**6th**	**7th**	**8th**	**9th**	**10th**	**11th**	**12th**	**13th**	**14th**	**15th**	**16th**	**17th**	**18th**	**19th**	**20th**	**21st**
Points	50	40	35	32	30	28	26	24	22	20	19	18	17	16	15	14	13	12	11	10	9

- The fastest driver in each qualifying session was awarded one additional point.
- Every driver who led at least one lap was awarded a bonus point, the driver who led the most laps got two points.

Pos	Driver	STP	ALA	IMS		DET	ROA	LAG		MOH	IOW	GAT	POR	MIL	NSH	Points
1	(United Kingdom) Louis Foster	3	5	7	1^{L}	**1**^{L}*	2	**1**^{L}*	**1**^{L}*	2	1^{L}	**1**^{L}*	**2**	**1**^{L}*	**1**^{1L}*	639
2	(United States) Jacob Abel	2	**1**^{L}*	**1**^{L}*	**2**	5	3	3	11	3	15	2	1^{L}*	2	8	517
3	(Brazil) Caio Collet RY	7	4	19	3^{L}*	2	5	2	2	**1**^{L}*	17	14	4	8	3	436
4	(New Zealand) Callum Hedge R	11	9	4	10	3	6	12	16	4	4	5	13	11	16	332
5	(Mexico) Salvador de Alba R	9	10	11	9	7	21	11	5	16	3	4	12	3	5	331
6	(Republic of Ireland) James Roe Jr.	16	3	15	4	16	18	5	19	15	**2**^{L}*	10	16	6	4	316
7	(United Kingdom) Jamie Chadwick	20	20	3	16	12	**1**^{L}*	9	6	10	7	16	14	5	17	310
8	(United States) Yuven Sundaramoorthy R	12	21	20	21	14	9	4	4	14	10	3	8	7	2	309
9	(United States) Bryce Aron R	19	8	14	19	20	8	16	3	18	8	6	3	4	7	302
10	(United States) Reece Gold	5	11	6	11	6	4	14	18	6	12	12	6	17		289
11	(United States) Myles Rowe R	8	6	5	7	4	19	6	17	19	18	17	7	15	14	285
12	(United States) Christian Bogle	10	13	9	15	11	14	7	8	11	6	8	11	14	11	284
13	(Republic of Ireland) Jonathan Browne R	6	14	8	8	9	17	15	20	7	9	11	10	9	12	279
14	(United States) Josh Pierson	13	17	21	12	8	7	13	9	9	11	13	9	12	10	264
15	(United States) Jack William Miller R	18	12	16	18	15	15	10	10	12	14	18	15	16	15	216
16	(United States) Christian Brooks R							8	7	5	5	7	5	10	9	208
17	(United States) Nolan Siegel	**1**^{L}*	2	2	5	18	Wth									177
18	(United States) Michael d'Orlando R	4	7	12	6	10	11								6	171
19	(United States) Nolan Allaer R	14	18	13	17	17	10	20	14	8					13	158
20	(Netherlands) Niels Koolen R	21	15	10	14	13	13	19	12		13					140
21	(United States) Lindsay Brewer R	15	19	17	20	19	16	17	15							102
22	(United States) Jordan Missig R			18	13		20			17		9				74
23	(Mexico) Ricardo Escotto R					21		18	13				17	13		59
24	(United States) Taylor Ferns R										16	15		18	18	53
25	(United Kingdom) Josh Mason R	17	16													27
26	(Brazil) Kiko Porto R						12									18
27	(United States) Jagger Jones									13						17
Pos	Driver	STP	ALA	IMS		DET	ROA	LAG		MOH	IOW	GAT	POR	MIL	NSH	Points

Color	Result
Gold	Winner
Silver	2nd place
Bronze	3rd place
Green	4th & 5th place
Light Blue	6th–10th place
Dark Blue	Finished (Outside Top 10)
Purple	Did not finish
Red	Did not qualify (DNQ)
Brown	Withdrawn (Wth)
Black	Disqualified (DSQ)
White	Did not start (DNS)
Blank	Did not participate (DNP)
Blank	Not competing

**In-line notation**
**Bold**	Pole position (1 point)
Italics	Ran fastest race lap
^{L}	Led a race lap (1 point)
*	Led most race laps (2 points)
^{1}	Qualifying cancelled no bonus point awarded
R	Rookie
RY	Rookie of the Year

- Ties in points broken by number of wins, or best finishes.

=== Teams' championship ===
Scoring system

Position	**1st**	**2nd**	**3rd**	**4th**	**5th**	**6th**	**7th**	**8th**	**9th**	**10th+**
Points	22	18	15	12	10	8	6	4	2	1

- Single car teams received 3 bonus points as an equivalency to multi-car teams
- Only the best two results counted for teams fielding more than two entries

Pos	Team	STP	ALA	IMS		DET	ROA	LAG		MOH	IOW	GAT	POR	MIL	NSH	Points
1	Andretti Global	3	3	3	1	1	1	1	1	2	1	1	2	1	1	428
1	Andretti Global	10	5	6	4	8	2	5	3	5	2	6	3	4	4	428
2	HMD Motorsports	1	2	2	3	2	4	2	2	1	4	5	4	5	3	351
2	HMD Motorsports	5	4	4	5	3	5	7	6	4	5	7	5	7	8	351
3	Abel Motorsports	2	1	1	2	5	3	3	4	3	6	2	1	2	2	310
3	Abel Motorsports	8	10	11	9	9	6	4	8	7	8	3	7	6	7	310
4	Andretti Cape Indy NXT	4	7	7	6	6	7	9	5	8	3	4	8	3	5	167
4	Andretti Cape Indy NXT	7	8	8	8	7	11								6	167
5	HMD Motorsports with Force Indy	6	6	5	7	4	10	6	11	9	9	8	6	9	9	113
6	Miller Vinatieri Racing	11	9	9	10	10	8	8	7	6	7	9	9	10	10	79
7	Juncos Hollinger Racing	9	11	10	11	11	9	10	9				10	8		40
7	Juncos Hollinger Racing					12		11	10							40
Pos	Team	STP	ALA	IMS		DET	ROA	LAG		MOH	IOW	GAT	POR	MIL	NSH	Points

== See also ==
- 2024 IndyCar Series
- 2024 USF Pro 2000 Championship
- 2024 USF2000 Championship
- 2024 USF Juniors
