= 2021 Indy Pro 2000 Championship =

Racing season

The 2021 Indy Pro 2000 Championship was the 23rd season in series history. An 18-round schedule was announced on October 21, 2020, featuring five permanent road courses, two street circuits, and two ovals. The series started on April 17, 2021 at Barber Motorsports Park.

Danish Christian Rasmussen, driving for Jay Howard Driver Development, won the championship in the last race of the season at the Mid-Ohio Sports Car Course.

== Drivers and teams ==
| Team | No. | Drivers | Rounds |
|---|---|---|---|
| Abel Motorsports | 51 | (United States) Jacob Abel | All |
| DEForce Racing | 7 | (Australia) Cameron Shields | 1–4 |
| DEForce Racing | 7 | (United States) Kory Enders | 13 |
| DEForce Racing | 8 | (United States) Nolan Siegel | 13 |
| Exclusive Autosport | 42 | (Russia) Artem Petrov | All |
| Exclusive Autosport | 44 | (United States) Christian Brooks | 17–18 |
| Exclusive Autosport | 91 | (United States) Braden Eves | All |
| Jay Howard Driver Development | 1 | (Denmark) Christian Rasmussen | All |
| Jay Howard Driver Development | 5 | (United States) Wyatt Brichacek | All |
| Juncos Racing; Juncos Hollinger Racing | 21 | (Barbados) Kyffin Simpson | 1–16 |
| Juncos Racing; Juncos Hollinger Racing | 22 | (Mexico) Manuel Sulaimán | 1–16 |
| Juncos Racing; Juncos Hollinger Racing | 22 | (United Kingdom) Enaam Ahmed | 17–18 |
| Juncos Racing; Juncos Hollinger Racing | 55 | (United States) Reece Gold | All |
| Legacy Autosport | 20 | (United States) Flinn Lazier | 1–4 |
| Miller Vinatieri Motorsports | 40 | (United States) Jack William Miller | All |
| Pabst Racing | 18 | (New Zealand) Hunter McElrea | All |
| Pabst Racing | 19 | (United States) Jordan Missig | 17–18 |
| Pabst Racing | 27 | (United States) Colin Kaminsky | 1–7 |
| RP Motorsport USA | 74 | (Brazil) Enzo Fittipaldi | 1–4 |
| RP Motorsport USA | 77 | (United Kingdom) Enaam Ahmed | 1–8 |
| Turn 3 Motorsport | 3 | (Republic of Ireland) James Roe | All |
| Velocity Racing Development | 11 | (United States) Hunter Yeany | 1–4, 9–12 |

== Schedule ==
| Rd. | Date | Race name | Track | Location |
|---|---|---|---|---|
| 1 | April 17–18 | Indy Pro 2000 Grand Prix of Barber Motorsports Park; Presented by Cooper Tires | R Barber Motorsports Park | Birmingham, Alabama |
| 2 | April 17–18 | Indy Pro 2000 Grand Prix of Barber Motorsports Park; Presented by Cooper Tires | R Barber Motorsports Park | Birmingham, Alabama |
| 3 | April 24–25 | Indy Pro 2000 Grand Prix of St. Petersburg; Presented by Cooper Tires | R Streets of St. Petersburg | St. Petersburg, Florida |
| 4 | April 24–25 | Indy Pro 2000 Grand Prix of St. Petersburg; Presented by Cooper Tires | R Streets of St. Petersburg | St. Petersburg, Florida |
| 5 | May 14–15 | Indy Pro 2000 Grand Prix of Indianapolis; Presented by Cooper Tires | R Indianapolis Motor Speedway Road Course | Speedway, Indiana |
| 6 | May 14–15 | Indy Pro 2000 Grand Prix of Indianapolis; Presented by Cooper Tires | R Indianapolis Motor Speedway Road Course | Speedway, Indiana |
| 7 | May 14–15 | Indy Pro 2000 Grand Prix of Indianapolis; Presented by Cooper Tires | R Indianapolis Motor Speedway Road Course | Speedway, Indiana |
| 8 | May 28–29* | Cooper Tires Freedom 90 | O Lucas Oil Raceway | Brownsburg, Indiana |
| 9 | June 19–20 | Cooper Tires Grand Prix of Road America; Powered by Elite Engines | R Road America | Elkhart Lake, Wisconsin |
| 10 | June 19–20 | Cooper Tires Grand Prix of Road America; Powered by Elite Engines | R Road America | Elkhart Lake, Wisconsin |
| 11 | July 3–4 | Cooper Tires Indy Pro 2000 Grand Prix of Mid-Ohio | R Mid-Ohio Sports Car Course | Lexington, Ohio |
| 12 | July 3–4 | Cooper Tires Indy Pro 2000 Grand Prix of Mid-Ohio | R Mid-Ohio Sports Car Course | Lexington, Ohio |
| 13 | August 21 | Cooper Tires Indy Pro 2000 Oval Challenge of St. Louis | O World Wide Technology Raceway | Madison, Illinois |
| 14 | August 28–29 | Indy Pro 2000 Grand Prix; Presented by The Andersen Companies | R New Jersey Motorsports Park | Millville, New Jersey |
| 15 | August 28–29 | Indy Pro 2000 Grand Prix; Presented by The Andersen Companies | R New Jersey Motorsports Park | Millville, New Jersey |
| 16 | August 28–29 | Indy Pro 2000 Grand Prix; Presented by The Andersen Companies | R New Jersey Motorsports Park | Millville, New Jersey |
| 17 | October 1–3 | VP Racing Fuels Champhionship Weekend; Presented By Cooper Tires | R Mid-Ohio Sports Car Course | Lexington, Ohio |
| 18 | October 1–3 | VP Racing Fuels Champhionship Weekend; Presented By Cooper Tires | R Mid-Ohio Sports Car Course | Lexington, Ohio |

* The race at Lucas Oil Raceway began on May 28, but was stopped and postponed to May 29 due to inclement weather.

* Following the cancellation of the Honda Indy Toronto, promoters replaced it with the second Mid-Ohio round.

== Race results ==
| Round | Race | Pole position | Fastest lap | Most laps led | Race Winner | |
| Round | Race | Pole position | Fastest lap | Most laps led | Driver | Team |
|---|---|---|---|---|---|---|
| 1 | Birmingham 1 | (United States) Braden Eves | (Denmark) Christian Rasmussen | (United States) Braden Eves | (United States) Braden Eves | Exclusive Autosport |
| 2 | Birmingham 2 | (Denmark) Christian Rasmussen | (Denmark) Christian Rasmussen | (Denmark) Christian Rasmussen | (New Zealand) Hunter McElrea (Note: Christian Rasmussen finished the race first, but was given a 5 second post race penalty for blocking, giving the win to McElrea.) | Pabst Racing |
| 3 | St. Petersburg 1 | (United States) Braden Eves | (United States) Jack William Miller | (United States) Braden Eves | (United States) Braden Eves | Exclusive Autosport |
| 4 | St. Petersburg 2 | (New Zealand) Hunter McElrea | (Denmark) Christian Rasmussen | (Denmark) Christian Rasmussen | (Denmark) Christian Rasmussen | Jay Howard Driver Development |
| 5 | Indianapolis GP 1 | (United States) Reece Gold | (United States) Reece Gold | (United States) Braden Eves | (Denmark) Christian Rasmussen | Jay Howard Driver Development |
| 6 | Indianapolis GP 2 | (United States) Reece Gold | (Denmark) Christian Rasmussen | (Russia) Artem Petrov | (Russia) Artem Petrov | Exclusive Autosport |
| 7 | Indianapolis GP 3 | (United States) Reece Gold | (United Kingdom) Enaam Ahmed | (Denmark) Christian Rasmussen | (Denmark) Christian Rasmussen | Jay Howard Driver Development |
| 8 | Lucas Oil | (United States) Reece Gold | (United States) Reece Gold | (United States) Reece Gold | (Denmark) Christian Rasmussen | Jay Howard Driver Development |
| 9 | Road America 1 | (Mexico) Manuel Sulaimán | (United States) Jacob Abel | (Mexico) Manuel Sulaimán | (Mexico) Manuel Sulaimán | Juncos Racing |
| 10 | Road America 2 | (Mexico) Manuel Sulaimán | (Denmark) Christian Rasmussen | (Denmark) Christian Rasmussen | (Denmark) Christian Rasmussen | Jay Howard Driver Development |
| 11 | Mid-Ohio 1 | (Denmark) Christian Rasmussen | (Denmark) Christian Rasmussen | (Denmark) Christian Rasmussen | (Denmark) Christian Rasmussen | Jay Howard Driver Development |
| 12 | Mid-Ohio 2 | (New Zealand) Hunter McElrea | (Cayman Islands) Kyffin Simpson | (New Zealand) Hunter McElrea | (New Zealand) Hunter McElrea | Pabst Racing |
| 13 | Gateway | (Republic of Ireland) James Roe | (Denmark) Christian Rasmussen | (United States) Braden Eves | (United States) Braden Eves | Exclusive Autosport |
| 14 | New Jersey 1 | (United States) Reece Gold | (United States) Reece Gold | (United States) Reece Gold | (United States) Reece Gold | Juncos Hollinger Racing |
| 15 | New Jersey 2 | (New Zealand) Hunter McElrea | (United States) Jacob Abel | (Russia) Artem Petrov | (Russia) Artem Petrov | Exclusive Autosport |
| 16 | New Jersey 3 | (New Zealand) Hunter McElrea | (Denmark) Christian Rasmussen | (New Zealand) Hunter McElrea | (New Zealand) Hunter McElrea | Pabst Racing |
| 17 | Mid-Ohio 3 | (Russia) Artem Petrov | (New Zealand) Hunter McElrea | (Denmark) Christian Rasmussen | (Denmark) Christian Rasmussen | Jay Howard Driver Development |
| 18 | Mid-Ohio 4 | (New Zealand) Hunter McElrea | (United States) Jacob Abel | (Republic of Ireland) James Roe | (Republic of Ireland) James Roe | Turn 3 Motorsport |

== Championship standings ==
=== Drivers' Championship ===
Scoring system

| Position | **1st** | **2nd** | **3rd** | **4th** | **5th** | **6th** | **7th** | **8th** | **9th** | **10th** | **11th** | **12th** | **13th** | **14th** | **15th** | **16th** | **17th** | **18th** | **19th** | **20th** |
| Points | 30 | 25 | 22 | 19 | 17 | 15 | 14 | 13 | 12 | 11 | 10 | 9 | 8 | 7 | 6 | 5 | 4 | 3 | 2 | 1 |
| Points (O) | 45 | 38 | 33 | 29 | 26 | 23 | 21 | 20 | 18 | 17 | 15 | 14 | 12 | 11 | 9 | 8 | 6 | 5 | 3 | 2 |

- The driver who qualified on pole was awarded one additional point.
- One point was awarded to the driver who led the most laps in a race.
- One point was awarded to the driver who set the fastest lap during the race.

| Pos | Driver | ALA | | STP | | IMS | | | IRP | ROA | | MOH1 | | GMP | NJMP | | | MOH2 | | Points |
|---|---|---|---|---|---|---|---|---|---|---|---|---|---|---|---|---|---|---|---|---|
| 1 | (Denmark) Christian Rasmussen | 13 | **2*** | 2 | 1* | 1 | 9 | 1* | 1 | 10 | 1* | **1*** | 5 | 2 | 3 | 9 | 9 | 1* | 3 | 445 |
| 2 | (United States) Braden Eves | **1*** | 4 | **1*** | 6 | 2* | 2 | 3 | 4 | 4 | 4 | 5 | 9 | 1* | 7 | 3 | 2 | 3 | 10 | 407 |
| 3 | (New Zealand) Hunter McElrea | 6 | 1 | 3 | **4** | 10 | 8 | 7 | 5 | 7 | 6 | 4 | **1*** | 3 | 2 | **2** | **1*** | 7 | **6** | 378 |
| 4 | (Russia) Artem Petrov | 2 | 3 | 4 | 8 | 5 | 1* | 5 | 7 | 2 | 11 | 2 | 2 | 12 | 9 | 1* | 3 | **2** | 4 | 374 |
| 5 | (United States) Reece Gold | 3 | 13 | 6 | 3 | **3** | **4** | **2** | **2*** | 5 | 2 | 6 | 4 | 8 | **1*** | 4 | 10 | 4 | 11 | 366 |
| 6 | (United States) Jacob Abel | 8 | 5 | 15 | 7 | 6 | 7 | 13 | 6 | 3 | 5 | 3 | 6 | 6 | 5 | 5 | 4 | 6 | 9 | 292 |
| 7 | (Republic of Ireland) James Roe | 15 | 11 | 13 | 16 | 8 | 10 | 11 | 11 | 6 | 10 | 8 | 11 | **4** | 6 | 10 | 5 | 11 | 1* | 241 |
| 8 | (Barbados) Kyffin Simpson | 11 | 17 | 10 | 14 | 4 | 3 | 6 | 8 | 11 | 3 | 7 | 3 | 11 | 10 | 8 | 7 | | | 231 |
| 9 | (Mexico) Manuel Sulaimán | DSQ | 8 | 5 | 2 | 9 | 11 | 8 | 3 | **1*** | **7** | 12 | 7 | 7 | Wth | Wth | Wth | | | 214 |
| 10 | (United States) Wyatt Brichacek | 14 | 6 | 8 | 15 | 12 | 13 | 12 | 10 | 12 | 9 | 10 | 10 | 10 | 8 | 6 | 6 | 9 | 8 | 212 |
| 11 | (United States) Jack William Miller | 16 | 14 | 12 | 13 | 11 | 6 | 9 | 9 | 9 | DNS | 9 | 8 | 13 | 4 | 7 | 8 | 12 | 7 | 203 |
| 12 | (United Kingdom) Enaam Ahmed | 5 | 9 | 7 | 9 | 13 | 5 | 4 | Wth | | | | | | | | | 8 | 2 | 138 |
| 13 | (United States) Colin Kaminsky | 7 | 7 | 9 | 5 | 7 | 12 | 10 | | | | | | | | | | | | 91 |
| 14 | (United States) Hunter Yeany | 10 | 12 | 16 | 12 | | | | | 8 | 8 | 11 | 12 | | | | | | | 79 |
| 15 | (Australia) Cameron Shields | 4 | 15 | 14 | 10 | | | | | | | | | | | | | | | 43 |
| 16 | (United States) Flinn Lazier | 9 | 16 | 11 | 11 | | | | | | | | | | | | | | | 37 |
| 17 | (United States) Christian Brooks | | | | | | | | | | | | | | | | | 5 | 5 | 34 |
| 18 | (United States) Nolan Siegel | | | | | | | | | | | | | 5 | | | | | | 26 |
| 19 | (Brazil) Enzo Fittipaldi | 12 | 10 | DNS | DNS | | | | | | | | | | | | | | | 20 |
| 20 | (United States) Jordan Missig | | | | | | | | | | | | | | | | | 10 | 12 | 20 |
| 21 | (United States) Kory Enders | | | | | | | | | | | | | 9 | | | | | | 18 |
| Pos | Driver | ALA | | STP | | IMS | | | IRP | ROA | | MOH1 | | GMP | NJMP | | | MOH2 | | Points |

| Color | Result |
|---|---|
| Gold | Winner |
| Silver | 2nd place |
| Bronze | 3rd place |
| Green | 4th & 5th place |
| Light Blue | 6th–10th place |
| Dark Blue | Finished (Outside Top 10) |
| Purple | Did not finish |
| Red | Did not qualify (DNQ) |
| Brown | Withdrawn (Wth) |
| Black | Disqualified (DSQ) |
| White | Did not start (DNS) |
| Blank | Did not participate |

**In-line notation**
| **Bold** | Pole position (1 point) |
| Italics | Ran fastest race lap (1 point) |
| * | Led most race laps (1 point); Not awarded if more than one driver leads most laps |
Rookie

=== Teams' championship ===
Scoring system

| Position | **1st** | **2nd** | **3rd** | **4th** | **5th** | **6th** | **7th** | **8th** | **9th** | **10th+** |
| Points | 22 | 18 | 15 | 12 | 10 | 8 | 6 | 4 | 2 | 1 |

- Single car teams received 3 bonus points as an equivalency to multi-car teams
- Only the best two results counted for teams fielding more than two entries

| Pos | Team | ALA | | STP | | IMS | | | LOR | ROA | | MOH | | GMP | NJMP | | | MOH | | Points |
|---|---|---|---|---|---|---|---|---|---|---|---|---|---|---|---|---|---|---|---|---|
| 1 | Exclusive Autosport | 1 | 3 | 1 | 6 | 2 | 1 | 3 | 4 | 2 | 4 | 2 | 2 | 1 | 7 | 1 | 2 | 2 | 4 | 473 |
| 1 | Exclusive Autosport | 2 | 4 | 4 | 8 | 5 | 2 | 5 | 7 | 4 | 10 | 5 | 8 | 11 | 9 | 3 | 3 | 3 | 5 | 473 |
| 2 | Juncos Racing; Juncos Hollinger Racing | 3 | 8 | 5 | 2 | 3 | 3 | 2 | 2 | 1 | 2 | 6 | 3 | 7 | 1 | 4 | 7 | 4 | 2 | 384 |
| 2 | Juncos Racing; Juncos Hollinger Racing | 11 | 13 | 6 | 3 | 4 | 4 | 6 | 3 | 5 | 3 | 7 | 4 | 8 | 10 | 8 | 10 | 7 | 10 | 384 |
| 3 | Jay Howard Driver Development | 13 | 2 | 2 | 1 | 1 | 9 | 1 | 1 | 10 | 1 | 1 | 5 | 2 | 3 | 6 | 6 | 1 | 3 | 312 |
| 3 | Jay Howard Driver Development | 14 | 6 | 8 | 14 | 11 | 12 | 11 | 9 | 11 | 8 | 10 | 9 | 10 | 8 | 9 | 9 | 8 | 8 | 312 |
| 4 | Pabst Racing | 6 | 1 | 3 | 4 | 7 | 8 | 7 | 5 | 7 | 6 | 4 | 1 | 3 | 2 | 2 | 1 | 6 | 6 | 273 |
| 4 | Pabst Racing | 7 | 7 | 9 | 5 | 9 | 11 | 9 | | | | | | | | | | 9 | 11 | 273 |
| 5 | Abel Motorsports | 8 | 5 | 14 | 7 | 6 | 7 | 12 | 6 | 3 | 5 | 3 | 6 | 6 | 5 | 5 | 4 | 5 | 9 | 198 |
| 6 | Turn 3 Motorsport | 15 | 11 | 12 | 15 | 8 | 10 | 10 | 10 | 6 | 9 | 8 | 10 | 4 | 6 | 10 | 5 | 10 | 1 | 134 |
| 7 | Miller Vinatieri Motorsports | 16 | 14 | 11 | 13 | 10 | 6 | 8 | 8 | 9 | DNS | 9 | 7 | 12 | 4 | 7 | 8 | 11 | 7 | 112 |
| 8 | RP Motorsport USA | 5 | 9 | 7 | 9 | 12 | 5 | 4 | Wth | | | | | | | | | | | 54 |
| 8 | RP Motorsport USA | 12 | 10 | DNS | DNS | | | | | | | | | | | | | | | 54 |
| 9 | Velocity Racing Development | 10 | 12 | 15 | 12 | | | | | 8 | 7 | 11 | 11 | | | | | | | 40 |
| 10 | DEForce Racing | 4 | 15 | 13 | 10 | | | | | | | | | 5 | | | | | | 39 |
| 10 | DEForce Racing | | | | | | | | | | | | | 9 | | | | | | 39 |
| 11 | Legacy Autosport | 9 | 16 | 10 | 11 | | | | | | | | | | | | | | | 17 |
| Pos | Team | ALA | | STP | | IMS | | | LOR | ROA | | MOH | | GMP | NJMP | | | MOH | | Points |

== See also ==
- 2021 IndyCar Series
- 2021 Indy Lights
- 2021 U.S. F2000 National Championship
