= Jack William Miller =

American racing driver (born 2003)

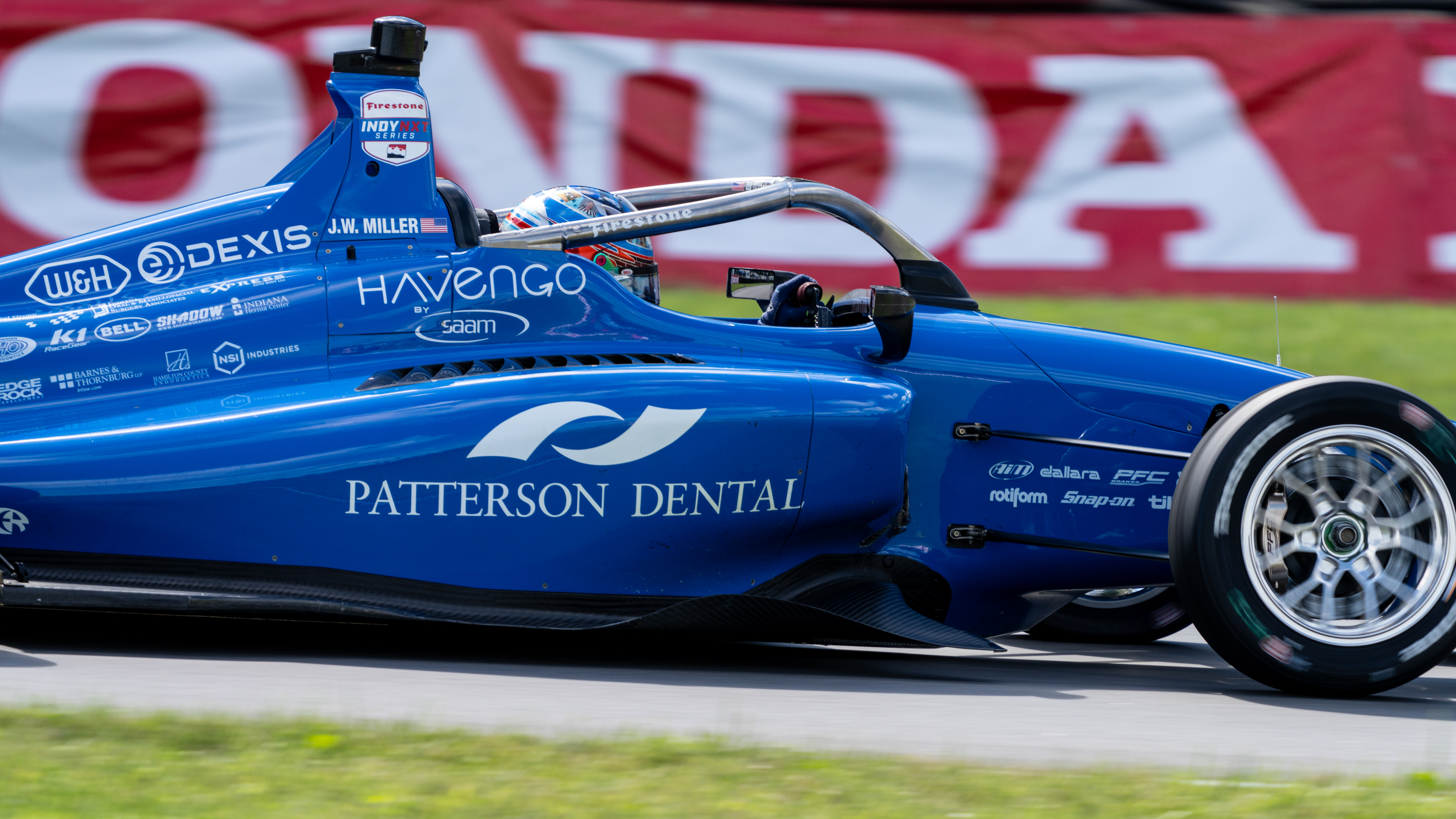
- Miller at Mid-Ohio in 2024
- Nationality: (United States) American
- Born: Jack William Miller; June 25, 2003 (age 23); Indianapolis, Indiana, U.S.

Indy NXT career
- Debut season: 2024
- Current team: Abel Motorsports with Miller Vinatieri Motorsports
- Car number: 40
- Starts: 16
- Championships: 0
- Wins: 0
- Podiums: 0
- Poles: 0
- Fastest laps: 0
- Best finish: 15th in 2024

Previous series
- 2021–23 2019–20 2017–18: Indy Pro 2000 Championship; U.S. F2000 National Championship; F4 USA Championship

Jack William "J.W." Miller (born June 25, 2003) is an American racing driver. He last competed in the Indy NXT championship for Abel Motorsports with Miller Vinatieri Motorsports.

== Personal life ==
Miller is a triathlete and fitness enthusiast and can be seen riding his bike around Indianapolis.

Miller is the son of former Indy Racing League driver and dentist Jack Miller.

== Racing record ==
=== Career summary ===
Season	Series	Team	Races	Wins	Poles	F/Laps	Podiums	Points	Position
2017	Formula 4 United States Championship	MVL Motorsport	17	0	0	0	0	23	18th
2018	Formula 4 United States Championship	Miller Vinatieri Motorsports	15	0	0	0	0	12	18th
2019	U.S. F2000 National Championship	Miller Vinatieri Motorsports	15	0	0	0	0	97	16th
2020	U.S. F2000 National Championship	Miller Vinatieri Motorsports	17	0	0	1	2	215	8th
2021	Indy Pro 2000 Championship	Miller Vinatieri Motorsports	17	0	0	1	0	189	11th
2022	Indy Pro 2000 Championship	Miller Vinatieri Motorsports	18	0	2	1	2	251	9th
2023	USF Pro 2000 Championship	Miller Vinatieri Motorsports	18	0	1	0	2	212	9th
2024	Indy NXT	Miller Vinatieri Racing	14	0	0	0	0	216	15th
2025	Indy NXT	Abel Motorsports with Miller Vinatieri Motorsports	14	0	0	0	0	266	10th
2026	Lamborghini Super Trofeo North America - Pro-Am	Alliance Racing	6	0	0	0	0	49	8th
2026	Lamborghini Super Trofeo North America - Pro-Am	Forty7 Motorsports	6	0	0	0	0	49	8th
2026	USF Pro 2000 Championship	Exclusive Autosport	0	0	0	0	0	0	NC

* Season still in progress.

=== Complete Formula 4 United States Championship results ===
(key) (Races in bold indicate pole position) (Races in italics indicate fastest lap)

Year	Entrant	1	2	3	4	5	6	7	8	9	10	11	12	13	14	15	16	17	18	19	20	DC	Points
2017	MVL Motorsports	HMS; 1; 5	HMS; 2 Ret	HMS; 3; 6	IMS; 1	IMS; 2	IMS; 3	MSP; 1; 11	MSP; 2; 10	MSP; 3; 9	MOH; 1 Ret	MOH; 2; 20	MOH; 3; 14	VIR; 1; 30	VIR; 2; 17	VIR; 3; 12	COTA1; 1 EX	COTA1; 2; 18	COTA1; 3; 19	COTA2; 1; 27	COTA2; 2; 9	18th	23
2018	Miller Vinatieri Motorsports	VIR; 1; 30	VIR; 2; 19	VIR; 3; 14	ROA; 1; 14	ROA; 2 Ret	ROA; 3 DNS	MOH; 1; 8	MOH; 2 DSQ	MOH; 3; 19	PIT; 1; 11	PIT; 2; 6	PIT; 3 Ret	NJMP; 1 DNS	NJMP; 2; 26	NJMP; 3; 23	COTA; 1; 16	COTA; 2 Ret				18th	12

=== American open-wheel racing results ===
==== U.S. F2000 National Championship ====
(key) (Races in bold indicate pole position) (Races in italics indicate fastest lap) (Races with * indicate most race laps led)

Year	Team	1	2	3	4	5	6	7	8	9	10	11	12	13	14	15	16	17	Rank	Points
2019	Miller Vinatieri Motorsports	STP; 1; 18	STP; 2; 17	IMS; 1; 17	IMS; 2; 19	LOR; 17	ROA; 1; 13	ROA; 2; 13	TOR; 1; 9	TOR; 2; 16	MOH; 1; 13	MOH; 2; 12	POR; 1; 13	POR; 2; 13	POR; 1; 17	POR; 2; 13			16th	97
2020	Miller Vinatieri Motorsports	ROA; 1; 18	ROA; 2; 13	MOH; 1; 16	MOH; 2; 17	MOH; 3; 5	LOR; 3	IMS; 1; 21	IMS; 2; 2	IMS; 3; 4*	MOH; 4; 15	MOH; 5; 6	MOH; 6; 10	NJMP; 1; 7	NJMP; 2; 8	NJMP; 3; 11	STP; 1; 6	STP; 2; 7	8th	215

==== Indy Pro 2000 / USF Pro 2000 Championship ====
(key) (Races in bold indicate pole position) (Races in italics indicate fastest lap) (Races with * indicate most race laps led)

Year	Team	1	2	3	4	5	6	7	8	9	10	11	12	13	14	15	16	17	18	Rank	Points
2021	Miller Vinatieri Motorsports	ALA; 1; 16	ALA; 2; 14	STP; 1; 12	STP; 2; 13	IMS; 1; 11	IMS; 2; 6	IMS; 3; 9	LOR; 9	ROA; 1; 9	ROA; 2 DNS	MOH; 1; 9	MOH; 2; 8	GMP; 13	NJMP; 1; 4	NJMP; 2; 7	NJMP; 3; 8	MOH; 3; 12	MOH; 4; 7	11th	203
2022	Miller Vinatieri Motorsports	STP; 1; 8	STP; 2; 6	ALA; 1; 13	ALA; 2; 10	IMS; 1; 15	**IMS**; **2**; 5	**IMS**; **3**; 3	IRP; 9	ROA; 1; 13	ROA; 2; 2	MOH; 1; 10	MOH; 2; 12	TOR; 1; 8	TOR; 2; 4	GMP; 14	POR; 1; 13	POR; 2; 5	POR; 3; 5	9th	251
2023	Miller Vinatieri Motorsports	STP; 1; 14	STP; 2; 9	SEB; 1; 11	SEB; 2; 6	IMS; 1; 5	IMS; 2; 15	**IRP**; 3	ROA; 1; 16	ROA; 2; 11	MOH; 1; 3	MOH; 2; 12	TOR; 1; 18	TOR; 2; 13	COTA; 1; 7	COTA; 1; 10	POR; 1; 12	POR; 2; 8	POR; 3; 14	9th	212
2026	Exclusive Autosport	ARL; 1	ARL; 2	IMS; 1 DNS	IMS; 2 DNS	IRP	ROA; 1	ROA; 2	MOH; 1	MOH; 2	MOH; 3	POR; 1	POR; 2	MAR; 1	MAR; 2	MIL	ROA; 1	ROA; 2	ROA; 3	—*	0*

* Season still in progress.

==== Indy NXT ====
(key) (Races in bold indicate pole position) (Races in italics indicate fastest lap) (Races with ^{L} indicate a race lap led) (Races with * indicate most race laps led)

Year	Team	1	2	3	4	5	6	7	8	9	10	11	12	13	14	Rank	Points
2024	Miller Vinatieri Motorsports	STP; 18	BAR; 12	IMS; 16	IMS; 18	DET; 15	RDA; 15	LAG; 10	LAG; 10	MOH; 12	IOW; 14	GMP; 18	POR; 15	MIL; 16	NSH; 15	15th	216
2025	Abel Motorsports with Miller Vinatieri Motorsports	STP; 16	BAR; 8	IMS; 9	IMS; 19	DET; 7	GMP; 19	RDA; 7	MOH; 11	IOW; 14	LAG; 7	LAG; 7	POR; 13	MIL; 17	NSH; 15	10th	266

* Season still in progress.
