= Jonathan Browne (racing driver) =

Irish racing driver (born 2000)

- Nationality: (Republic of Ireland) Irish
- Born: 10 July 2000 (age 26) Ratoath, County Meath, Ireland

Indy NXT career
- Debut season: 2024
- Categorisation: FIA Silver
- Car number: 9
- Former teams: Chip Ganassi Racing, HMD Motorsports
- Starts: 15
- Championships: 0
- Wins: 0
- Podiums: 0
- Poles: 0
- Fastest laps: 0
- Best finish: 13th in 2024

Jonathan Browne (born 10 July 2000) is an Irish racing driver. He most recently competed in the 2025 Indy NXT with Chip Ganassi Racing.

== Career ==
Browne started racing in Irish and British karting competitions before moving into the UK's Formula Ford championship in 2018. He finished his first year sixteenth but improved to fifth overall during his sophomore season, taking a win and four further podiums. Browne also dominated the Formula Ford Festival in 2019, winning from pole for Cliff Dempsey Racing. He once again took pole in 2020 but finished the race in second place behind Rory Smith.

In 2021, Browne stepped up to the GB3 Championship with Hillspeed, competing in the series' final three events. At his debut round in Silverstone Browne finished third in the opening race. He would go on to end up nineteenth in the standings.

Browne moved onto the Road to Indy pathway in 2022, racing for Turn 3 Motorsport in the Indy Pro 2000 Championship. Though he scored his maiden pole position at Indianapolis, he only took a best race finish of fifth — in a year where Browne was juggling his driving commitments in the US with his final year of university in Ireland — and concluded the campaign twelfth overall. Despite this, Browne returned to Turn 3 for the 2023 season. His second year bore more fruit, as Browne took third place at Road America after a brief battle for the lead with Lirim Zendeli and Francesco Pizzi and capped off the season by finishing third at Portland. Browne finished eighth in the championship, four places below rookie teammate Michael d'Orlando.

After two years in the third-tier feeder series, Browne progressed to Indy NXT in 2024, driving for HMD Motorsports. He finished inside the top ten in eight of the 14 races but lacked any standout results, leaving him thirteenth at season's end, third-lowest of all full-time entrants.

== Personal life ==
Browne graduated from TU Dublin with a degree in mechanical engineering.

== Racing record ==
=== Career summary ===
Season	Series	Team	Races	Wins	Poles	F/Laps	Podiums	Points	Position
2018	National Formula Ford Championship		23	0	0	0	0	93	16th
2018	Formula Ford Festival		1	0	0	0	0	N/A	12th
2019	National Formula Ford Championship	Cliff Dempsey Racing	20	1	2	2	5	376	5th
2019	Formula Ford Festival	Cliff Dempsey Racing	1	1	1	1	1	N/A	**1st**
2020	BRSCC National FF1600 Championship	Low Dempsey Racing	7	0	0	1	1	150	4th
2020	Formula Ford Festival	Low Dempsey Racing	1	0	1	0	1	N/A	**2nd**
2021	GB3 Championship	Hillspeed	9	0	0	0	1	83	19th
2021	Formula Ford Festival	Vamos Racing	1	0	0	0	0	N/A	8th
2022	Indy Pro 2000 Championship	Turn 3 Motorsport	17	0	1	0	0	187	12th
2023	USF Pro 2000 Championship	Turn 3 Motorsport	18	0	0	0	2	230	8th
2024	Indy NXT	HMD Motorsports	14	0	0	0	0	279	13th
2025	Indy NXT	Chip Ganassi Racing	1	0	0	0	0	26	25th
2026	Michelin Pilot Challenge - GS	Czabok-Simpson Motorsport	3	0	0	0	0	110	54th
2026-27	Asian Le Mans Series - LMP2	Team Virage							

^{*} Season still in progress.

=== American open–wheel racing results ===
==== Indy Pro 2000 Championship / USF Pro 2000 Championship ====
Year	Team	1	2	3	4	5	6	7	8	9	10	11	12	13	14	15	16	17	18	Rank	Points
2022	Turn 3 Motorsport	STP; 1; 15	STP; 2; 14	ALA; 1; 10	ALA; 2; 9	**IMS**; **1**; 9	IMS; 2; 10	IMS; 3; 9	IRP; 10	ROA; 1; 8	ROA; 2; 9	MOH; 1; 12	MOH; 2; 11	TOR; 1; 10	TOR; 2; 11	GMP	POR; 1; 5	POR; 2; 14	POR; 3; 12	12th	187
2023	Turn 3 Motorsport	STP; 1; 10	STP; 2; 12	SEB; 1; 12	SEB; 2; 8	IMS; 1; 4	IMS; 2; 4	IRP; 7	ROA; 1; 4	ROA; 2; 3	MOH; 1; 17	MOH; 2; 15	TOR; 1; 15	TOR; 2; 10	COTA; 1; 10	COTA; 1; 13	POR; 1; 13	POR; 2; 9	POR; 3; 3	8th	230

==== Indy NXT ====
(key) (Races in bold indicate pole position) (Races in italics indicate fastest lap) (Races with ^{L} indicate a race lap led) (Races with * indicate most race laps led)

Year	Team	1	2	3	4	5	6	7	8	9	10	11	12	13	14	Rank	Points
2024	HMD Motorsports	STP; 6	BAR; 14	IMS; 8	IMS; 8	DET; 9	RDA; 17	LAG; 15	LAG; 20	MOH; 7	IOW; 9	GMP; 11	POR; 10	MIL; 9	NSH; 12	13th	279
2025	Chip Ganassi Racing	STP; 7	BAR	IMS	IMS	DET	GMP	RDA	MOH	IOW	LAG	LAG	POR	MIL	NSH	25th	26

* Season still in progress.
