= Louis Foster =

British racing driver (born 2003)

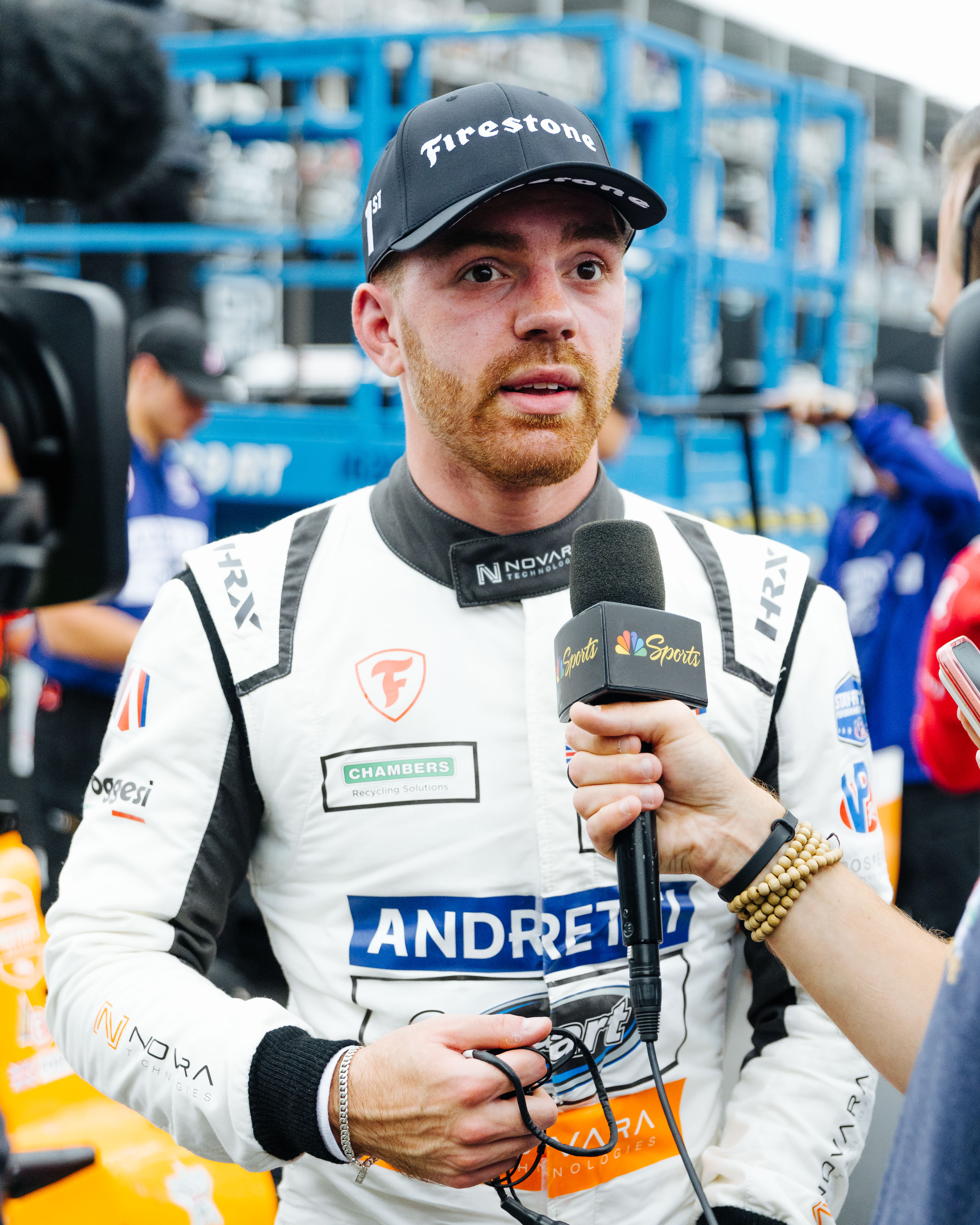
- Foster at 2024 Detroit Grand Prix
- Nationality: (United Kingdom) British
- Born: 27 July 2003 (age 23) Odiham, Hampshire, England
- Categorisation: FIA Silver

IndyCar Series career
- 31 races run over 2 years
- Team: No. 45 (Rahal Letterman Lanigan Racing)
- Best finish: 18th (2026)
- First race: 2025 Firestone Grand Prix of St. Petersburg (St. Petersburg)
- Last race: 2026 Mission Grand Prix of Monterey (Laguna Seca)
| Wins | Podiums | Poles |
|---|---|---|
| 0 | 0 | 2 |

Previous series
- 2023–2024 2022 2020–2021 2020 2019 2018: Indy NXT; Indy Pro 2000 Championship; Euroformula Open Championship; BRDC British Formula 3 Championship; F4 British Championship; Ginetta Junior Championship

Championship titles
- 2024 2022 2020 2018: Indy NXT; Indy Pro 2000 Championship; BRDC British Formula 3 Rookie Championship; Ginetta Junior Rookie Championship

Awards
- 2025: IndyCar Rookie of the Year

NASCAR FedEx Freight Truck Series career
- 1 race run over 1 year
- 2026 position: 74th
- Best finish: 74th (2026)
- First race: 2026 LiUNA! 150 (Lime Rock)
| Wins | Top tens | Poles |
|---|---|---|
| 0 | 0 | 0 |
- Statistics up to date as of 6 November 2026.

Louis James Foster (born 27 July 2003) is a British racing driver. He competes full-time in the NTT IndyCar Series, driving the No. 45 Honda for Rahal Letterman Lanigan Racing. He is the 2024 Indy NXT champion and also won the 2022 Indy Pro 2000 championship. Foster previously competed in the 2021 Euroformula Open Championship with CryptoTower Racing and the 2020 BRDC British Formula 3 Championship with Double R Racing where he finished third.

== Early racing career ==
=== Karting ===
Foster began karting at the age of nine. He competed at local karting circuits, Camberley and Forest Edge, winning championships at both, in 2013 and 2015 respectively.

=== Ginetta Junior Championship ===
Foster made his car racing debut in the final three meetings of the 2017 Ginetta Junior Championship, driving with Elite Motorsport. He then competed in that year's Ginetta Junior Winter Series, where he won the Rookie Championship.

Foster returned to the championship in 2018 and was a persistent title contender throughout the season. Foster claimed nineteen podiums, of which nine were victories plus four pole positions and two fastest laps on his way to second place in the championship. He scored the most points of any driver but lost out on the title by just eight points to teammate Adam Smalley after dropped scores were accounted for.

During the campaign, Foster accrued several records; the first rookie to win three races in one weekend, the first driver to win five races in succession and the youngest driver to score an outright victory.

=== F4 British Championship ===
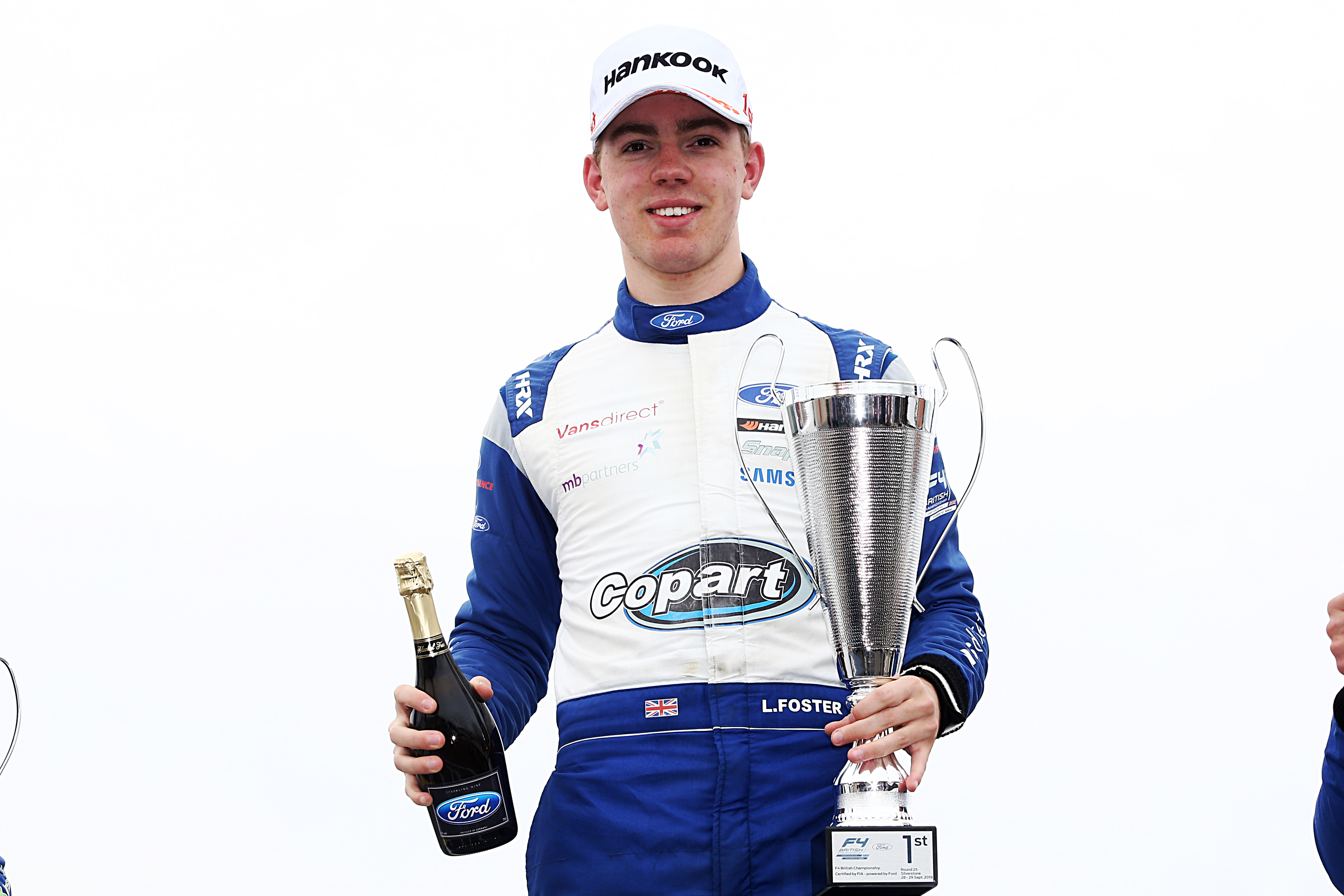
Foster after winning a British F4 race at Silverstone.

Following his successful stint in Ginetta Juniors, Foster moved to single-seaters when he joined Double R Racing for the 2019 F4 British Championship certified by FIA, powered by Ford EcoBoost season. In February 2019, Foster received sponsorship from global used car dealership Copart.

Foster was immediately on the pace, taking victory in only the second race of the season. He followed that with a sublime weekend in Donington, winning two races and scoring a third-place finish in the other to give him a seventeen point lead in the championship table.

Across the rest of the season, Foster accrued another three wins and nine podium finishes - dominating at Silverstone – to finish the year third in the championship, remaining in the title hunt until the season finale weekend at Brands Hatch.

=== BRDC F3 Championship ===
For 2020, Foster graduated to the BRDC British F3 Championship, remaining with Double R Racing. The opening round at Oulton Park, scheduled for 11 and 13 April, was postponed due to the COVID-19 pandemic.

The season subsequently began at Oulton Park on the 1st and 2 August. In the opening qualifying session of the year, Foster set the benchmark and claimed double pole position in his debut weekend in the series. He followed his qualifying success with a maiden podium finish.

Moving on to Donington Park, Foster claimed his first win the series with a mature drive from the front-row of the grid. He then claimed a string of top-ten finishes, including climbing ten places from 18th to 8th in the second race at Donington.

Further success came at Brands Hatch when Foster scored three top-six finishes, including a third-place podium in the final race. He carried this momentum into the series' second visit to Donington Park, where he claimed another race victory, this time climbing from sixth on the grid, alongside two eleventh place finishes.

Snetterton marked Foster's most successful weekend in the series to date as the Hampshire racer took his second double pole position of the season before converting those into his third win of the year and a further second-place podium alongside fourth and fifth in the additional two races. It also meant Foster took the lead of the Jack Cavill Pole Position Cup.

=== Euroformula Open ===
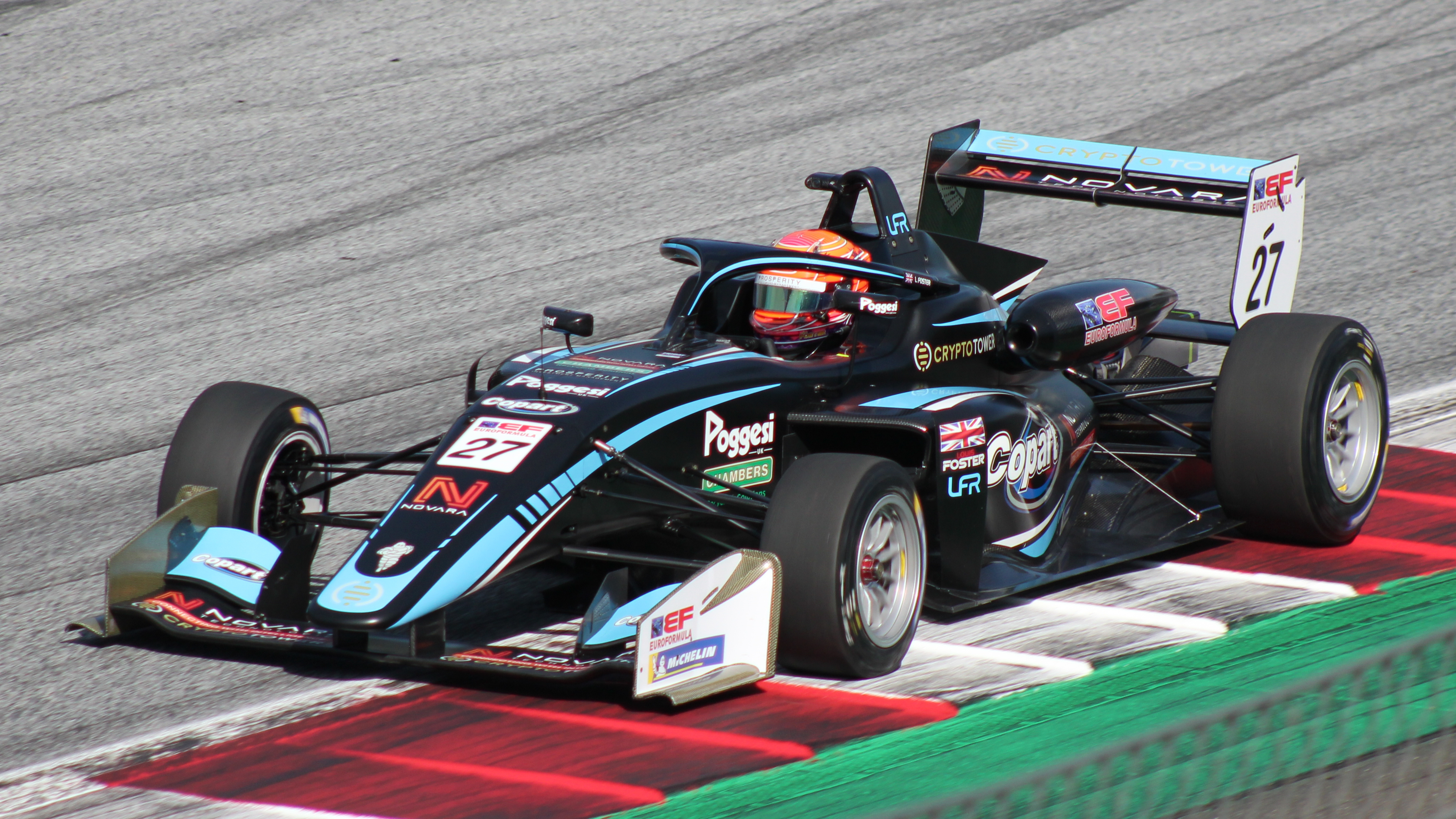
Foster driving at the Red Bull Ring during the 2021 Euroformula Open Championship.

It was announced in October 2020 that Foster would make his debut in Euroformula Open at Circuit de Spa-Francorchamps. Competing with Double R Racing once again, Foster quickly found himself on the pace as he gained four places in the opening race to break into the top ten. Qualifying fifth for the second race, Foster launched himself to third on the first lap and put himself in prime position to take victory in only his second race in the series.

Shortly after making his debut at Spa-Francorchamps, it was announced that Foster would also contest the rescheduled season finale at Circuit de Barcelona-Catalunya, with the track hosting four races in lieu of the cancelled round at Circuito del Jarama. After qualifying eleventh, tenth, fourth and twelfth, Foster pulled off a number of daring overtakes in races one and two to climb into the top ten, finishing eighth in both races. Starting from fourth in race three, Foster leapfrogged two cars on the first lap to take second place and another podium finish in the series, coming within touching distance of the win.

In 2021, Foster switched to CryptoTower Racing to contest the full season. He took pole position at the first round at Portimão and finished in the podium in races 1 and 3, with his brake disc exploding on the formation lap in race 2. Foster secured another two podiums at the second round at Paul Ricard before going on to take a triple win at the third round of the championship at Spa-Francorchamps.

In September, for finishing as Euroformula Open vice champion, Foster was nominated for the Autosport BRDC Award.

=== Indy Pro 2000 ===
Earlier in 2021, Foster ran in a private test with Jay Howard Driver Development and later ran in the Chris Griffis Memorial Test with Exclusive Autosport, setting the fastest time of the test. For the 2022 season, Foster signed to drive for Exclusive Autosport for the full season. A dominant season ensued, as the Briton won seven races, taking the title at the final round at Portland.

=== Formula Regional ===
During his 2023 pre-season, Foster joined the 2023 Formula Regional Oceania Championship with Giles Motorsport for the final three rounds, winning on debut at Manfeild.

=== Indy NXT ===
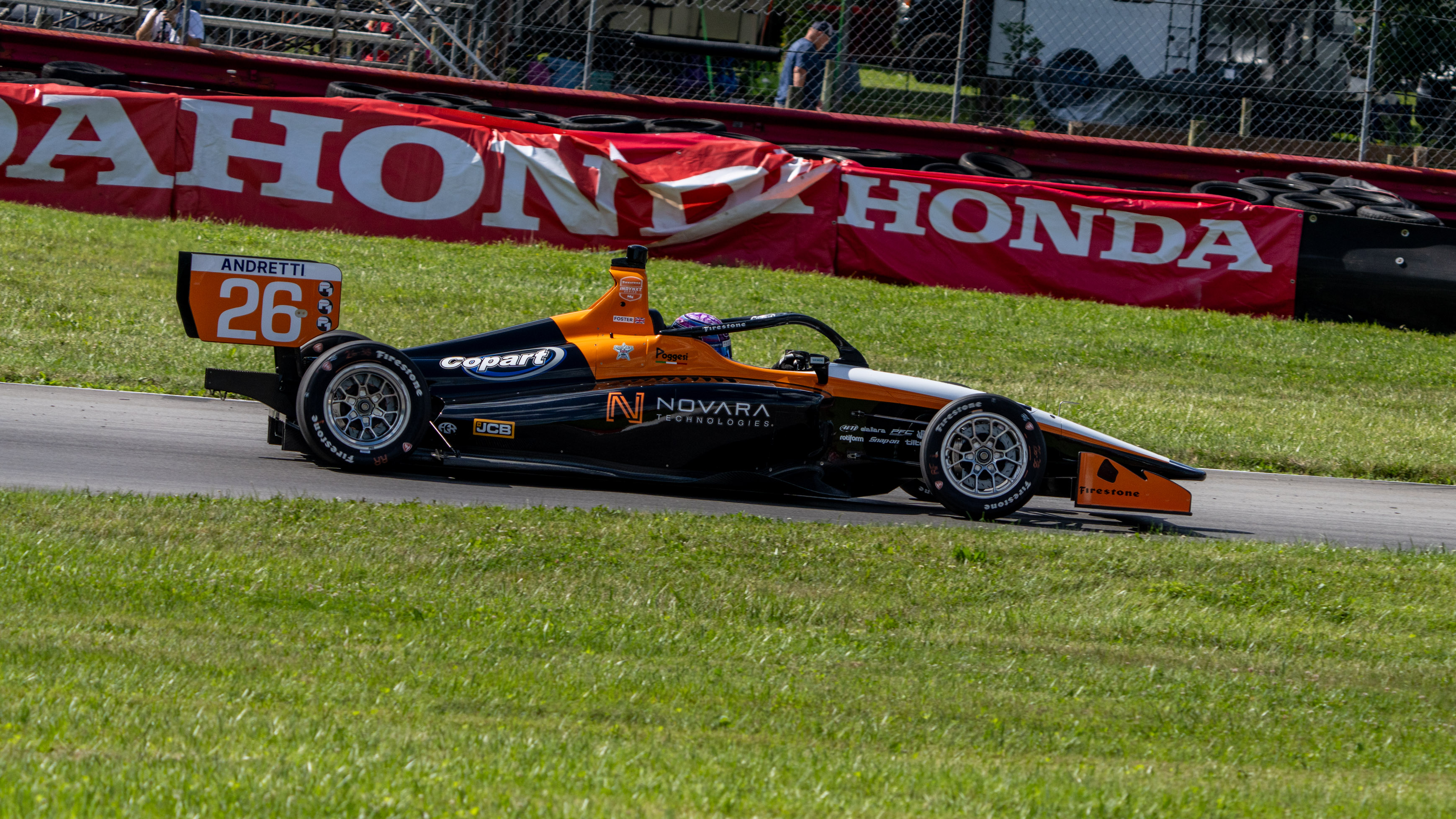
Foster's 2024 Indy NXT car

Following his Indy Pro Championship victory, Foster was announced to be signing for Andretti Autosport for the 2023 Indy NXT season. Foster showed speed from the very first race weekend with pole position on his debut weekend at Round 1 in St Petersburg. Over the course of the 2023 season, Foster secured four pole positions, including a double pole at the Detroit Street Circuit, and two race wins at Mid Ohio and Portland.

Foster signed again to continue with Andretti for the 2024 Indy NXT season where he won the championship in dominant fashion, winning eight of fourteen races and taking seven pole positions.

=== IndyCar career ===
Foster tested an Andretti Autosport car at Road America in September 2023.

==== Rahal Letterman Lanigan Racing (2025–) ====
===== 2025 season =====
On October 9, Foster was announced to have signed a multi-year deal with Rahal Letterman Lanigan Racing.

Foster won the prestigious Indycar Rookie of the Year Award after showing consistent speed over the course of the 2025 Indycar season and finishing as the lead Rookie driver in the Championship. A highlight of the season was a stunning Pole Position at the Road America Road Course.

===== 2026 season =====
At the end of 2025, Foster penned a multi-year deal to remain with Rahal Letterman Lanigan Racing for 2026 and beyond.

=== NASCAR career ===
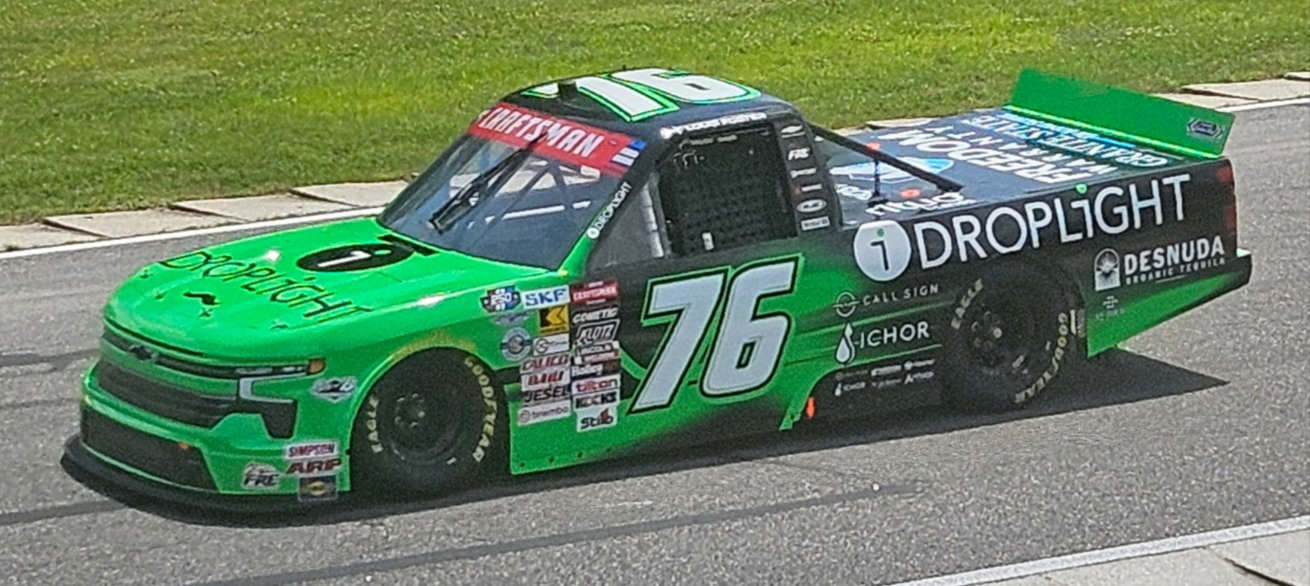
Foster's No. 76 truck at Lime Rock Park in 2026

Before IndyCar's Mid-Ohio race, it was announced that Foster will make his debut in the NASCAR Craftsman Truck Series at Lime Rock Park, driving the No. 76 Chevrolet Silverado for Freedom Racing Enterprises.

== Personal life ==
Louis is the son of former British Touring Car Championship racer Nick Foster. He attended Lord Wandsworth College in Hook, Hampshire.

== Racing record ==
=== Career summary ===
| Season | Series | Team | Races | Wins | Poles | F/Laps | Podiums | Points | Position |
|---|---|---|---|---|---|---|---|---|---|
| 2017 | Ginetta Junior Championship | Elite Motorsport | 9 | 0 | 0 | 0 | 0 | 75 | 19th |
| 2017 | Ginetta Junior Winter Series | Elite Motorsport | 4 | 0 | 0 | 0 | 0 | 76 | 6th |
| 2018 | Ginetta Junior Championship | Elite Motorsport | 26 | 9 | 4 | 2 | 19 | 671 | **2nd** |
| 2019 | F4 British Championship | Double R Racing | 30 | 6 | 5 | 9 | 13 | 353 | **3rd** |
| 2019–20 | MRF Challenge Formula 2000 | MRF Racing | 6 | 1 | 0 | 2 | 2 | 79 | 10th |
| 2020 | BRDC British Formula 3 Championship | Double R Racing | 24 | 3 | 4 | 1 | 6 | 396 | **3rd** |
| 2020 | Euroformula Open Championship | Double R Racing | 7 | 1 | 0 | 0 | 2 | 57 | 12th |
| 2021 | Euroformula Open Championship | CryptoTower Racing | 24 | 3 | 2 | 4 | 13 | 315 | **2nd** |
| 2022 | Indy Pro 2000 Championship | Exclusive Autosport | 18 | 7 | 5 | 10 | 12 | 451 | **1st** |
| 2023 | Formula Regional Oceania Championship | Giles Motorsport | 9 | 1 | 0 | 4 | 4 | 147 | 12th |
| 2023 | Indy NXT | Andretti Autosport | 14 | 2 | 4 | 2 | 6 | 410 | 4th |
| 2024 | Indy NXT | Andretti Global | 14 | 8 | 7 | 7 | 12 | 639 | **1st** |
| 2025 | IndyCar Series | Rahal Letterman Lanigan Racing | 17 | 0 | 1 | 0 | 0 | 213 | 23rd |
| 2026 | IndyCar Series | Rahal Letterman Lanigan Racing | 18 | 0 | 1 | 0 | 0 | 267 | 18th |
| 2026 | NASCAR Trucks | Freedom Racing Enterprises | 1 | 0 | 0 | 0 | 0 | -* | -* |

* Season still in progress

=== Complete Ginetta Junior Championship results ===
(key) (Races in bold indicate pole position) (Races in italics indicate fastest lap)

| Year | Team | 1 | 2 | 3 | 4 | 5 | 6 | 7 | 8 | 9 | 10 | 11 | 12 | 13 | 14 | 15 | 16 | 17 | 18 | 19 | 20 | 21 | 22 | 23 | 24 | 25 | 26 | DC | Points |
|---|---|---|---|---|---|---|---|---|---|---|---|---|---|---|---|---|---|---|---|---|---|---|---|---|---|---|---|---|---|
| 2017 | Elite Motorsport | BHI; 1 | BHI; 2 | DON; 1 | DON; 2 | DON; 3 | THR1; 1 | THR1; 2 | OUL; 1 | OUL; 2 | CRO; 1 | CRO; 2 | CRO; 3 | SNE; 1 | SNE; 2 | SNE; 3 | KNO; 1 | KNO; 2 | ROC; 1 Ret | ROC; 2; 15 | ROC; 3; 13 | SIL; 1; 15 | SIL; 2; 13 | SIL; 3; 9 | BHGP; 1; 12 | BHGP; 2; 9 | BHGP; 3; 8 | 19th | 75 |
| 2018 | Elite Motorsport | BHI; 1; 4 | BHI; 2; 4 | DON; 1; 2 | DON; 2; 3 | DON; 3; 1 | THR1; 1; 8 | **THR1**; **2**; 3 | OUL; 1; 3 | OUL; 2; 2 | CRO; 1; 5 | CRO; 2; 7 | CRO; 3; 3 | **SNE**; **1**; 4 | SNE; 2; 3 | SNE; 3; 3 | ROC; 1; 1 | ROC; 2; 1 | **ROC**; **3**; 2 | KNO; 1; 1 | **KNO**; **2**; 1 | SIL; 1; 1 | SIL; 2; 1 | **SIL**; **3**; 1 | BHGP; 1; 4 | BHGP; 2; 2 | BHGP; 3; 1 | 2nd | 671 |

=== Complete F4 British Championship results ===
(key) (Races in bold indicate pole position) (Races in italics indicate fastest lap)

| Year | Team | 1 | 2 | 3 | 4 | 5 | 6 | 7 | 8 | 9 | 10 | 11 | 12 | 13 | 14 | 15 | 16 | 17 | 18 | 19 | 20 | 21 | 22 | 23 | 24 | 25 | 26 | 27 | 28 | 29 | 30 | Pos | Points |
|---|---|---|---|---|---|---|---|---|---|---|---|---|---|---|---|---|---|---|---|---|---|---|---|---|---|---|---|---|---|---|---|---|---|
| 2019 | Double R Racing | BRI; 1; 7 | BRI; 2; 1 | BRI; 3; 4 | **DON**; **1**; 1 | DON; 2; 3 | **DON**; **3**; 1 | **THR1**; **1**; 10 | THR1; 2; 4 | THR1; 3; 2 | CRO; 1; 3 | CRO; 2; 6 | CRO; 3; 2 | OUL; 1; 6 | OUL; 2; 6 | OUL; 3; 5 | SNE; 1; 8 | SNE; 2; 4 | SNE; 3; 8 | THR2; 1; 12 | THR2; 2 Ret | THR2; 3; 3 | KNO; 1 Ret | KNO; 2; 5 | KNO; 3; 1 | **SIL**; **1**; 1 | SIL; 2; 3 | **SIL**; **3**; 1 | BHGP; 1 Ret | BHGP; 2; 6 | BHGP; 3; 6 | 3rd | 353 |

=== Complete MRF Challenge Formula 2000 Championship results ===
(key) (Races in bold indicate pole position) (Races in italics indicate fastest lap)

| Year | 1 | 2 | 3 | 4 | 5 | 6 | 7 | 8 | 9 | 10 | 11 | 12 | 13 | 14 | 15 | DC | Points |
|---|---|---|---|---|---|---|---|---|---|---|---|---|---|---|---|---|---|
| 2019–20 | DUB; 1 | DUB; 2 | DUB; 3 | DUB; 4 | DUB; 5 | BHR; 1 | BHR; 2 | BHR; 3 | BHR; 4 | CHE; 1; 4 | CHE; 2; 10 | CHE; 3; 3 | CHE; 4; 5 | CHE; 5; 1 | CHE; 6; 4 | 10th | 79 |

=== Complete BRDC British Formula 3 Championship results ===
(key) (Races in bold indicate pole position) (Races in italics indicate fastest lap)

| Year | Entrant | 1 | 2 | 3 | 4 | 5 | 6 | 7 | 8 | 9 | 10 | 11 | 12 | 13 | 14 | 15 | 16 | 17 | 18 | 19 | 20 | 21 | 22 | 23 | 24 | DC | Points |
|---|---|---|---|---|---|---|---|---|---|---|---|---|---|---|---|---|---|---|---|---|---|---|---|---|---|---|---|
| 2020 | Double R Racing | **OUL**; **1**; 13 | OUL; 2 Ret | **OUL**; **3**; 3 | OUL; 4; 8 | DON1; 1; 1 | DON1; 2; 8^{10} | DON1; 3; 6 | BRH; 1; 4 | BRH; 2; 14 | BRH; 3; 6 | BRH; 4; 3 | DON2; 1; 11 | DON2; 2; 1^{5} | DON2; 3; 11 | **SNE**; **1**; 2 | SNE; 2; 4^{8} | **SNE**; **3**; 1 | **SNE**; **4**; 5 | DON3; 1 Ret | DON3; 2; 12 | DON3; 3; 4 | SIL; 1; 5 | SIL; 2; 5^{8} | SIL; 3; 16 | 3rd | 396 |

=== Complete Euroformula Open Championship results ===
(key) (Races in bold indicate pole position; races in italics indicate points for the fastest lap of top ten finishers)

| Year | Entrant | 1 | 2 | 3 | 4 | 5 | 6 | 7 | 8 | 9 | 10 | 11 | 12 | 13 | 14 | 15 | 16 | 17 | 18 | 19 | 20 | 21 | 22 | 23 | 24 | DC | Points |
|---|---|---|---|---|---|---|---|---|---|---|---|---|---|---|---|---|---|---|---|---|---|---|---|---|---|---|---|
| 2020 | Double R Racing | HUN; 1 | HUN; 2 | LEC; 1 | LEC; 2 | RBR; 1 | RBR; 2 | MNZ; 1 | MNZ; 2 | MNZ; 3 | MUG; 1 | MUG; 2 | SPA; 1; 7 | SPA; 2; 1 | SPA; 3 Ret | CAT; 1; 8 | CAT; 2; 8 | CAT; 3; 2 | CAT; 4 Ret | | | | | | | 12th | 57 |
| 2021 | CryptoTower Racing | **POR**; **1**; 2 | POR; 2 NC | POR; 3; 2 | LEC; 1; 3 | LEC; 2; 2 | LEC; 3; 6 | **SPA**; **1**; 1 | SPA; 2; 1 | SPA; 3; 1 | HUN; 1; 7 | HUN; 2; 4 | HUN; 3; 6 | IMO; 1; 2 | IMO; 2; 5 | IMO; 3; 4 | RBR; 1; 2 | RBR; 2; 3 | RBR; 3; 3 | MNZ; 1 Ret | MNZ; 2; 14 | MNZ; 3 Ret | CAT; 1; 5 | CAT; 2; 2 | CAT; 3; 3 | 2nd | 315 |

=== Complete Formula Regional Oceania Championship results ===
(key) (Races in bold indicate pole position) (Races in italics indicate fastest lap)

| Year | Team | 1 | 2 | 3 | 4 | 5 | 6 | 7 | 8 | 9 | 10 | 11 | 12 | 13 | 14 | 15 | DC | Points |
|---|---|---|---|---|---|---|---|---|---|---|---|---|---|---|---|---|---|---|
| 2023 | Giles Motorsport | HIG; 1 | HIG; 2 | HIG; 3 | TER; 1 | TER; 2 | TER; 3 | MAN; 1; 1 | MAN; 2; 2 | MAN; 3; 13 | HMP; 1 Ret | HMP; 2; 8 | HMP; 3; 2 | TAU; 1; 2 | TAU; 2; 7 | TAU; 3; 15 | 12th | 147 |

=== American open-wheel racing results ===
==== Indy Pro 2000 Championship ====
(key) (Races in bold indicate pole position) (Races in italics indicate fastest lap) (Races with * indicate most race laps led)

| Year | Team | 1 | 2 | 3 | 4 | 5 | 6 | 7 | 8 | 9 | 10 | 11 | 12 | 13 | 14 | 15 | 16 | 17 | 18 | Ran | Points |
|---|---|---|---|---|---|---|---|---|---|---|---|---|---|---|---|---|---|---|---|---|---|
| 2022 | Exclusive Autosport | STP; 1; 3 | STP; 2; 2 | ALA; 1; 4 | ALA; 2; 3 | IMS; 1; 14 | IMS; 2; 13 | IMS; 3; 1* | IRP; 1 | ROA; 1; 1* | ROA; 2; 13 | **MOH**; **1**; 1* | **MOH**; **2**; 2 | **TOR**; **1**; 1* | **TOR**; **2**; 1* | GMP; 4 | **POR**; **1**; 1* | POR; 2; 2 | POR; 3; 6 | 1st | 451 |

==== Indy NXT ====
(key) (Races in bold indicate pole position) (Races in italics indicate fastest lap) (Races with ^{L} indicate a race lap led) (Races with * indicate most race laps led)

| Year | Team | 1 | 2 | 3 | 4 | 5 | 6 | 7 | 8 | 9 | 10 | 11 | 12 | 13 | 14 | Rank | Points |
|---|---|---|---|---|---|---|---|---|---|---|---|---|---|---|---|---|---|
| 2023 | Andretti Autosport | **STP**; 14^{L} | BAR; 14 | IMS; 2 | **DET**; 19 | **DET**; 3^{L} | RDA; 6 | MOH; 1^{L} | IOW; 7 | NSH; 6 | IMS; 17 | GMP; 2 | **POR**; 1^{*} | LAG; 18 | LAG; 3 | 4th | 410 |
| 2024 | Andretti Global | STP; 3 | BAR; 5 | IMS; 7 | IMS; 1 | **DET**; 1 | RDA; 2 | **LAG**; 1* | **LAG**; 1* | MOH; 2 | IOW; 1 | **GMP**; 1* | **POR**; 2 | **MIL**; 1* | **NSH**; 1* | 1st | 639 |

==== IndyCar Series ====
(key) (Races in bold indicate pole position; races in italics indicate fastest lap)

| Year | Team | No. | Chassis | Engine | 1 | 2 | 3 | 4 | 5 | 6 | 7 | 8 | 9 | 10 | 11 | 12 | 13 | 14 | 15 | 16 | 17 | 18 | Rank | Points | Ref |
|---|---|---|---|---|---|---|---|---|---|---|---|---|---|---|---|---|---|---|---|---|---|---|---|---|---|
| 2025 | Rahal Letterman Lanigan Racing | 45 | Dallara DW12 | Honda | STP; 27 | THE; 24 | LBH; 16 | ALA; 26 | IMS; 11 | INDY; 12 | DET; 22 | GTW; 26 | **ROA**; 11 | MOH; 14 | IOW; 14 | IOW; 14 | TOR; 21 | LAG; 17 | POR; 13 | MIL; 17 | NSH; 20 | | 23rd | 213 | |
| 2026 | Rahal Letterman Lanigan Racing | 45 | Dallara DW12 | Honda | STP; 14 | PHX; 23 | ARL; 13 | ALA; 25 | LBH; 16 | IMS; 7 | INDY; 21 | DET; 7 | GTW; 20 | ROA; 14 | MOH; 18 | NSH; 17 | POR; 15 | **MRK**; 22* | WSH; 18 | MIL; 11 | MIL; 10 | LAG; 14 | 18th | 267 | |

==== Indianapolis 500 ====
| Year | Chassis | Engine | Start | Finish | Team |
|---|---|---|---|---|---|
| 2025 | Dallara | Honda | 20 | 12 | Rahal Letterman Lanigan Racing |
| 2026 | Dallara | Honda | 21 | 21 | Rahal Letterman Lanigan Racing |

=== NASCAR ===
(key) (Bold – Pole position awarded by qualifying time. Italics – Pole position earned by points standings or practice time. * – Most laps led. ** – All laps led.)

==== Craftsman Truck Series ====
NASCAR Craftsman Truck Series results
| Year | Team | No. | Make | 1 | 2 | 3 | 4 | 5 | 6 | 7 | 8 | 9 | 10 | 11 | 12 | 13 | 14 | 15 | 16 | 17 | 18 | 19 | 20 | 21 | 22 | 23 | 24 | 25 | NCTSC | Pts | Ref |
|---|---|---|---|---|---|---|---|---|---|---|---|---|---|---|---|---|---|---|---|---|---|---|---|---|---|---|---|---|---|---|---|
| 2026 | Freedom Racing Enterprises | 76 | Chevy | DAY | ATL | STP | DAR | ROC | BRI | TEX | GLN | DOV | CLT | NSH | MCH | COR | LRP; 21 | NWS | IRP | RCH | NHA | BRI | KAN | CLT | PHO | TAL | MAR | HOM | 74th | 16 | |

Sporting positions
| Preceded by Linus Lundqvist | IndyCar Series; Rookie of the Year; 2025 | Succeeded by Incumbent |
