= Jack Miller (racing driver) =

American racing driver (born 1961)

- Nationality: American
- Born: June 14, 1961 (age 65) Indianapolis, Indiana, U.S.
- Retired: 2001

Indy Racing League IndyCar Series
- Years active: 1997–2001
- Teams: Arizona Motorsport; Sinden Racing Services; Tri-Star Racing; Cahill Racing
- Starts: 22
- Wins: 0
- Poles: 0
- Best finish: 9 in 1996–1997 & 1998

Previous series
- 1986, 1992–1996: Indy Lights

Championship titles
- 1993: Indy Lights B-Series Champion

Jack Miller (born June 14, 1961), usually known as Dr. Jack Miller, is an American retired racing driver. He drove in the Indy Racing League from 1997 to 2001 and the Indianapolis 500 from 1997 to 1999. Miller is a practicing dentist and was accordingly "The Racing Dentist." For much of his racing career, he was sponsored by dental product companies including Crest and Water Pik.

Miller's best IRL finish was a ninth in 1998 at Charlotte. His best finish in the Indianapolis 500 was a twentieth his rookie year of 1997. During his stay in Indy Lights he won the 1993 B-series championship. This class of racing was only run in 1993 and consisted of drivers using the previous March chassis as the rest of the series introduced new Lola chassis. Miller won the championship by virtue of being the only driver to compete in every race in a B-series car.

Miller's final IRL start came at Atlanta in 2001. Miller was involved in a thirteen-car crash, and suffered injuries that ended his racing career. He was planning on entering the 2001 Indianapolis 500, but withdrew after the crash and retired from driving.

In 2016, Miller co-founded Miller Vinatieri Motorsports with former Indianapolis Colts kicker Adam Vinatieri, with the team initially entering cars in the Formula 4 United States Championship, but later moving to the Road to Indy with entries into the U.S. F2000 National Championship and the Indy Pro 2000 Championship.

Miller's son, Jack William Miller, is also a racing driver and has driven for the Miller Vinatieri team since 2018.

== Motorsports Career Results ==
=== American Open-Wheel ===
(key) (Races in bold indicate pole position)

==== IndyCar ====
Year	Team	1	2	3	4	5	6	7	8	9	10	11	12	13	Rank	Points	Ref
**1996-97**	Arizona Motorsports	NWH	LSV	WDW; 15	PHX; 20	INDY; 20	TXS; 24	PPI; 16	CHR; 23	NH2; 19	LV2; 29				**23rd**	**114**	
**1998**	Sinden Racing Services	WDW; 23	PHX; DNQ	INDY; 21	TXS; 22	NWH; 16	DOV; 20	CLT; 9	PPIR; 23	ATL; 27	TX2; 12	LSV; 28			**23rd**	**100**	
**1999**	Tri-Star Motorsports	WDW	PHX	CLT	INDY; 31	TXS	PPI	ATL; 18	DOV	PP2	LSV	TX2			**39th**	**13**	
**2000**	Tri-Star Motorsports	WDW	PHX	LSV; 24	INDY; DNQ	TXS	PPI	ATL	KTY	TX2					**45th**	**6**	
**2001**	Cahill Racing	PHX	HMS	ATL; 25	INDY; Wth	TXS	PPI	RIR	KAN	NSH	KTY	STL	CHI	TX2	**46th**	**5**	

Years	Teams	Races	Poles	Wins	Podiums (Non-win)	Top 10s (Non-podium)	Indianapolis 500 Wins	Championships
5	3	22	0	0	0	1	0	0

==== Indy 500 results ====
Year	Chassis	Engine	Start	Finish
1997	Dallara	Infiniti	17th	20th
1998	Dallara	Infiniti	15th	21st
1999	Dallara	Oldsmobile	31st	31st
2000	Dallara	Oldsmobile	Failed to Qualify	
2001	Withdrew due to injury			
