= 2022 24 Hours of Daytona =

60th 24 Hours of Daytona race

| Previous: 2021 | Next: 2023 |
Index: Races | Winners

Map of the Daytona International Speedway combined road course

The 2022 24 Hours of Daytona (formally the 2022 Rolex 24 at Daytona) was an endurance sports car race sanctioned by the International Motor Sports Association (IMSA). The event was held at Daytona International Speedway combined road course in Daytona Beach, Florida, on January 29–30, 2022. This event was the 60th running of the 24 Hours of Daytona since its inception in 1962, and the first of 12 races across multiple classes in the 2022 IMSA SportsCar Championship, as well as the first of four rounds in the 2022 Michelin Endurance Cup. The #60 Meyer Shank Racing Acura, driven by Tom Blomqvist, Hélio Castroneves, Oliver Jarvis, Simon Pagenaud, took the overall win in one of the most competitive events in race history. The top four overall finishers led for at least 88 laps each. Despite being fourth with around three hours left in the race, a monster stretch from Blomqvist helped his team assume the lead before giving way to Castroneves. Castroneves held off former teammate and two-time champion Ricky Taylor to win his second Rolex 24 in a row. The final margin of 3.028 seconds was the third closest in race history. It was also Meyer Shank Racing's first win in IMSA since 2020.

== Background ==
Daytona International Speedway, where the race was held

NASCAR founder Bill France Sr., who built Daytona International Speedway in 1959, conceived of the 24 Hours of Daytona to attract European sports-car endurance racing to the United States and provide international exposure to the speedway. It is informally considered part of the Triple Crown of Endurance Racing, with the 12 Hours of Sebring and the 24 Hours of Le Mans.

International Motor Sports Association's (IMSA) president John Doonan confirmed the race was part of the schedule for the 2022 IMSA SportsCar Championship (IMSA SCC) in August 2021. It was the ninth consecutive year it was part of the IMSA SCC, and 60th 24 Hours of Daytona. The 24 Hours of Daytona was the first of twelve scheduled sports car endurance races of 2022 by IMSA, and the first of four races of the Michelin Endurance Cup (MEC). It took place at the 12-turn, 3.56-mile (5.73 km) Daytona International Speedway in Daytona Beach, Florida from January 29 to 30.

== Entries ==
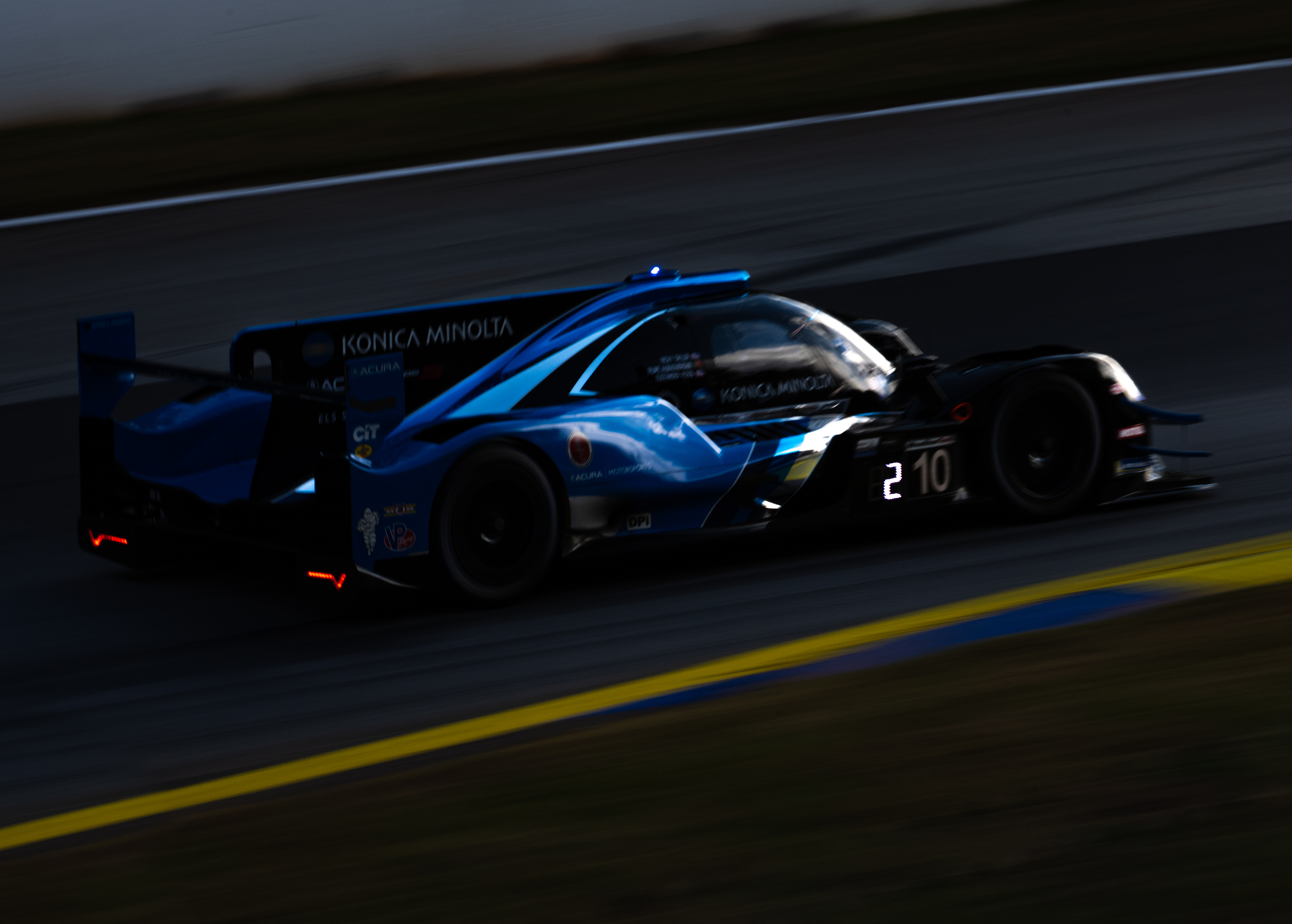
Wayne Taylor Racing (pictured during practice for the 2021 Petit Le Mans) entered the 2022 24 Hours of Daytona as the defending race winners, having won the 24-hour race in the prior three editions -- 2021, 2020, and 2019.

The list of entries for the 24-hour race consisted of 61 cars across five classes, the largest field for the 24 Hours of Daytona since the inception of the IMSA SportsCar Championship in 2014. There were seven entries in Daytona Prototype International (DPi), 10 entries in Le Mans Prototype 2 (LMP2), nine entries in LMP3, and 35 entries across both GT Daytona classes, with 12 entered in GTD Pro, and 23 entered in GTD.

After the demise of the GT Le Mans (GTLM) class at the end of the 2021 Season, the International Motor Sports Association replaced the class with an all-pro version of the existing GT Daytona (GTD) class, known as GTD-Pro. The class would run under the same balance of performance restrictions as the existing GTD class, after the two classes had their regulations aligned in August 2021. The aligned Balance of Performance and sporting regulations was a key factor in the record 35 car field, helping to drum up major interest in an all-pro version of an already popular class.

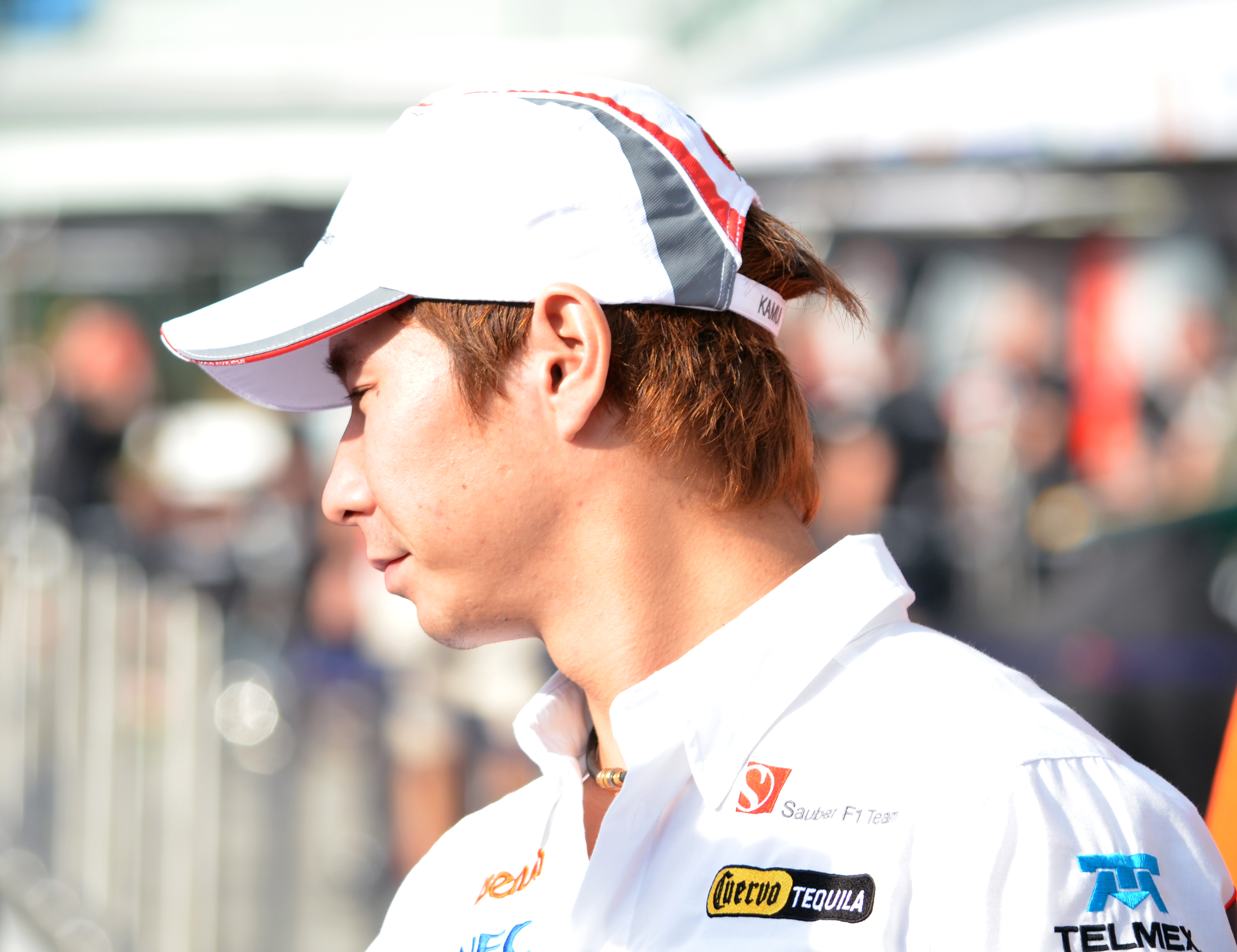
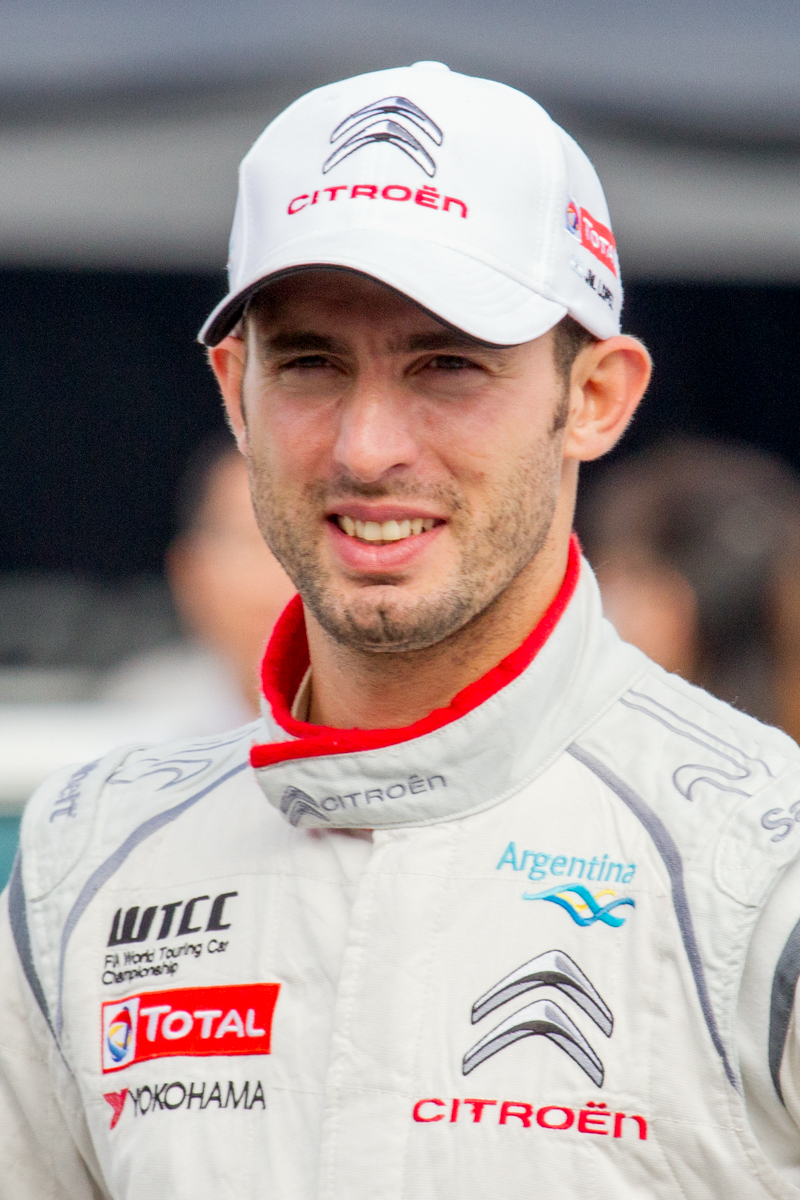
Two of the drivers who won the 2021 24 Hours of Le Mans overall, Kamui Kobayashi (pictured in 2011) and José María López (pictured in 2014), took part in the race with an Action Express Racing-entered Cadillac DPi-V.R.

In the Daytona Prototype International class, Chip Ganassi Racing expanded to a two-car full-season Cadillac operation, after just running a single car for 2021. Action Express Racing continued to run an extra car for the race, with Toyota Gazoo Racing driver José María López in place of Meyer-Shank Racing-bound Simon Pagenaud. Mazda Motorsports withdrew after the 2021 season had drawn to a close, leaving only two brands in the class, Cadillac and Acura. This edition of the Daytona is also set to be the final one to include the DPi class before the introduction of LMDh for 2023.

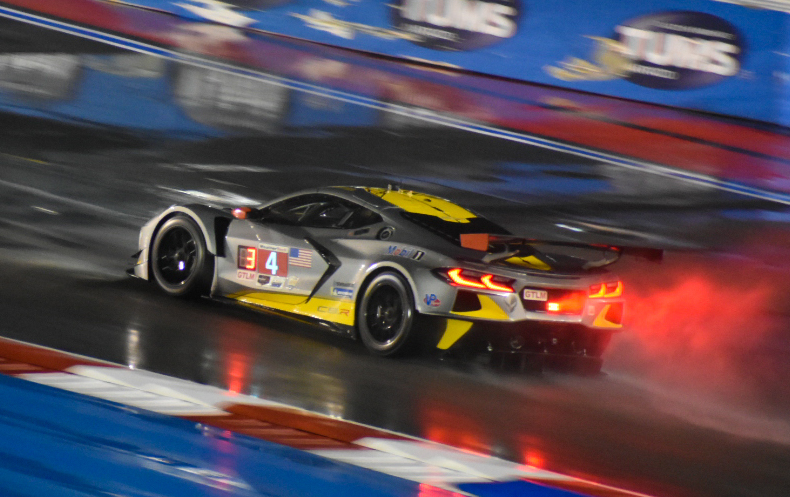
Corvette Racing moved to the new GTD Pro class with a de-tuned version of their Chevrolet Corvette C8.R.

After the demise of GTLM, Corvette Racing and BMW Team RLL moved to the GTD Pro class. The former de-tuned their designed-for-GTLM Chevrolet Corvette C8.R to GT3 specification, whilst the latter entered the class with the brand-new BMW M4 GT3. Both organizations have one full-season team and one extra car for Endurance races.

== Roar Before the 24 ==
=== Motul Pole Award 100 ===
The Motul Pole Award 100 was held on January 23. It was a qualifying race, awarding qualifying points and determining the starting lineup for the 24 Hours of Daytona.

==== Results ====
Class winners denoted in bold and with ‡.

| Pos | Class | No. | Team / Entrant | Drivers | Chassis | Laps | Time/Retired |
| Pos | Class | No. | Team / Entrant | Drivers | Engine | Laps | Time/Retired |
|---|---|---|---|---|---|---|---|
| 1 | **DPi** | **10** | **Konica Minolta Acura ARX-05** | **(United States) Ricky Taylor (Portugal) Filipe Albuquerque** | **Acura ARX-05** | **61** | **1:40:45.641**‡ |
| 1 | **DPi** | **10** | **Konica Minolta Acura ARX-05** | **(United States) Ricky Taylor (Portugal) Filipe Albuquerque** | **Acura AR35TT 3.5 L Turbo V6** | **61** | **1:40:45.641**‡ |
| 2 | DPi | 5 | JDC-Miller MotorSports | (France) Tristan Vautier (United Kingdom) Richard Westbrook | Cadillac DPi-V.R | 61 | +7.900 |
| 2 | DPi | 5 | JDC-Miller MotorSports | (France) Tristan Vautier (United Kingdom) Richard Westbrook | Cadillac 5.5 L V8 | 61 | +7.900 |
| 3 | DPi | 48 | Ally Cadillac | (Japan) Kamui Kobayashi (United States) Jimmie Johnson | Cadillac DPi-V.R | 61 | +9.569 |
| 3 | DPi | 48 | Ally Cadillac | (Japan) Kamui Kobayashi (United States) Jimmie Johnson | Cadillac 5.5 L V8 | 61 | +9.569 |
| 4 | DPi | 60 | Meyer Shank Racing with Curb Agajanian | (United Kingdom) Oliver Jarvis (United Kingdom) Tom Blomqvist | Acura ARX-05 | 61 | +15.643 |
| 4 | DPi | 60 | Meyer Shank Racing with Curb Agajanian | (United Kingdom) Oliver Jarvis (United Kingdom) Tom Blomqvist | Acura AR35TT 3.5 L Turbo V6 | 61 | +15.643 |
| 5 | DPi | 01 | Cadillac Racing | (Netherlands) Renger van der Zande (France) Sébastien Bourdais | Cadillac DPi-V.R | 61 | +22.680 |
| 5 | DPi | 01 | Cadillac Racing | (Netherlands) Renger van der Zande (France) Sébastien Bourdais | Cadillac 5.5 L V8 | 61 | +22.680 |
| 6 | DPi | 02 | Cadillac Racing | (New Zealand) Earl Bamber (United Kingdom) Alex Lynn | Cadillac DPi-V.R | 61 | +25.550 |
| 6 | DPi | 02 | Cadillac Racing | (New Zealand) Earl Bamber (United Kingdom) Alex Lynn | Cadillac 5.5 L V8 | 61 | +25.550 |
| 7 | DPi | 31 | Whelen Engineering Racing | (Brazil) Pipo Derani (United States) Tristan Nunez | Cadillac DPi-V.R | 61 | +56.737 |
| 7 | DPi | 31 | Whelen Engineering Racing | (Brazil) Pipo Derani (United States) Tristan Nunez | Cadillac 5.5 L V8 | 61 | +56.737 |
| 8 | **LMP2** | **52** | **PR1/Mathiasen Motorsports** | **(United States) Ben Keating (Denmark) Mikkel Jensen** | **Oreca 07** | **60** | **+1 Lap‡** |
| 8 | **LMP2** | **52** | **PR1/Mathiasen Motorsports** | **(United States) Ben Keating (Denmark) Mikkel Jensen** | **Gibson Technology GK428 4.2 L V8** | **60** | **+1 Lap‡** |
| 9 | LMP2 | 11 | PR1/Mathiasen Motorsports | (United States) Steven Thomas (United States) Jonathan Bomarito | Oreca 07 | 60 | +1 Lap |
| 9 | LMP2 | 11 | PR1/Mathiasen Motorsports | (United States) Steven Thomas (United States) Jonathan Bomarito | Gibson Technology GK428 4.2 L V8 | 60 | +1 Lap |
| 10 | LMP2 | 68 | G-Drive Racing by APR | (France) François Heriau (Germany) René Rast | Aurus 01 | 60 | +1 Lap |
| 10 | LMP2 | 68 | G-Drive Racing by APR | (France) François Heriau (Germany) René Rast | Gibson Technology GK428 4.2 L V8 | 60 | +1 Lap |
| 11 | LMP2 | 20 | High Class Racing | (Denmark) Dennis Andersen (Switzerland) Fabio Scherer | Oreca 07 | 60 | +1 Lap |
| 11 | LMP2 | 20 | High Class Racing | (Denmark) Dennis Andersen (Switzerland) Fabio Scherer | Gibson Technology GK428 4.2 L V8 | 60 | +1 Lap |
| 12 | LMP2 | 81 | DragonSpeed USA | (United States) Eric Lux (Canada) Devlin DeFrancesco | Oreca 07 | 60 | +1 Lap |
| 12 | LMP2 | 81 | DragonSpeed USA | (United States) Eric Lux (Canada) Devlin DeFrancesco | Gibson Technology GK428 4.2 L V8 | 60 | +1 Lap |
| 13 | LMP2 | 29 | Racing Team Nederland | (Netherlands) Frits van Eerd (United States) Dylan Murry | Oreca 07 | 60 | +1 Lap |
| 13 | LMP2 | 29 | Racing Team Nederland | (Netherlands) Frits van Eerd (United States) Dylan Murry | Gibson Technology GK428 4.2 L V8 | 60 | +1 Lap |
| 14 | LMP2 | 69 | G-Drive Racing by APR | (United States) John Falb (Australia) James Allen | Aurus 01 | 59 | +2 Laps |
| 14 | LMP2 | 69 | G-Drive Racing by APR | (United States) John Falb (Australia) James Allen | Gibson Technology GK428 4.2 L V8 | 59 | +2 Laps |
| 15 | LMP2 | 8 | Tower Motorsport | (Canada) John Farano (Switzerland) Louis Delétraz | Oreca 07 | 59 | +2 Laps |
| 15 | LMP2 | 8 | Tower Motorsport | (Canada) John Farano (Switzerland) Louis Delétraz | Gibson Technology GK428 4.2 L V8 | 59 | +2 Laps |
| 16 | LMP2 | 22 | United Autosports | (United States) James McGuire (United States) Will Owen | Oreca 07 | 59 | +2 Laps |
| 16 | LMP2 | 22 | United Autosports | (United States) James McGuire (United States) Will Owen | Gibson Technology GK428 4.2 L V8 | 59 | +2 Laps |
| 17 | **LMP3** | **36** | **Andretti Autosport** | **(United States) Jarett Andretti (Australia) Josh Burdon** | **Ligier JS P320** | **57** | **+4 Laps‡** |
| 17 | **LMP3** | **36** | **Andretti Autosport** | **(United States) Jarett Andretti (Australia) Josh Burdon** | **Nissan VK56DE 5.6L V8** | **57** | **+4 Laps‡** |
| 18 | LMP3 | 6 | Mühlner Motorsports America | (Germany) Mortiz Kranz (United States) Ayrton Ori | Duqueine M30 - D08 | 56 | +5 Laps |
| 18 | LMP3 | 6 | Mühlner Motorsports America | (Germany) Mortiz Kranz (United States) Ayrton Ori | Nissan VK56DE 5.6L V8 | 56 | +5 Laps |
| 19 | LMP3 | 13 | AWA | (Canada) Orey Fidani (Canada) Kuno Wittmer | Duqueine M30 - D08 | 56 | +5 Laps |
| 19 | LMP3 | 13 | AWA | (Canada) Orey Fidani (Canada) Kuno Wittmer | Nissan VK56DE 5.6L V8 | 56 | +5 Laps |
| 20 | **GTD Pro** | **63** | **TR3 Racing** | **(Italy) Andrea Caldarelli (Italy) Mirko Bortolotti** | **Lamborghini Huracán GT3 Evo** | **56** | **+5 Laps‡** |
| 20 | **GTD Pro** | **63** | **TR3 Racing** | **(Italy) Andrea Caldarelli (Italy) Mirko Bortolotti** | **Lamborghini 5.2 L V10** | **56** | **+5 Laps‡** |
| 21 | GTD Pro | 9 | Pfaff Motorsports | (France) Mathieu Jaminet (Brazil) Felipe Nasr | Porsche 911 GT3 R | 56 | +5 Laps |
| 21 | GTD Pro | 9 | Pfaff Motorsports | (France) Mathieu Jaminet (Brazil) Felipe Nasr | Porsche MA1.76/MDGG.G 4.0 L Flat 6 | 56 | +5 Laps |
| 22 | **GTD** | **57** | **Winward Racing** | **(United States) Russell Ward (Austria) Lucas Auer** | **Mercedes-AMG GT3 Evo** | **56** | **+5 Laps‡** |
| 22 | **GTD** | **57** | **Winward Racing** | **(United States) Russell Ward (Austria) Lucas Auer** | **Mercedes-AMG M159 6.2 L V8** | **56** | **+5 Laps‡** |
| 23 | GTD | 59 | Crucial Motorsports | (United States) Jon Miller (United States) Paul Holton | McLaren 720S GT3 | 56 | +5 Laps |
| 23 | GTD | 59 | Crucial Motorsports | (United States) Jon Miller (United States) Paul Holton | McLaren M840T 4.0L Turbo V8 | 56 | +5 Laps |
| 24 | GTD Pro | 15 | Proton USA | (Germany) Dirk Müller (United States) Austin Cindric | Mercedes-AMG GT3 Evo | 56 | +5 Laps |
| 24 | GTD Pro | 15 | Proton USA | (Germany) Dirk Müller (United States) Austin Cindric | Mercedes-AMG M159 6.2 L V8 | 56 | +5 Laps |
| 25 | GTD Pro | 23 | Heart of Racing Team | (United Kingdom) Ross Gunn (Spain) Alex Riberas | Aston Martin Vantage AMR GT3 | 55 | +6 Laps |
| 25 | GTD Pro | 23 | Heart of Racing Team | (United Kingdom) Ross Gunn (Spain) Alex Riberas | Aston Martin 4.0 L Turbo V8 | 55 | +6 Laps |
| 26 | GTD Pro | 14 | VasserSullivan | (United Kingdom) Ben Barnicoat (United States) Kyle Kirkwood | Lexus RC F GT3 | 55 | +6 Laps |
| 26 | GTD Pro | 14 | VasserSullivan | (United Kingdom) Ben Barnicoat (United States) Kyle Kirkwood | Toyota 2UR 5.0 L V8 | 55 | +6 Laps |
| 27 | GTD | 12 | VasserSullivan | (United States) Frankie Montecalvo (United States) Townsend Bell | Lexus RC F GT3 | 55 | +6 Laps |
| 27 | GTD | 12 | VasserSullivan | (United States) Frankie Montecalvo (United States) Townsend Bell | Toyota 2UR 5.0 L V8 | 55 | +6 Laps |
| 28 | GTD | 75 | SunEnergy1 | (Australia) Kenny Habul (Italy) Raffaele Marciello | Mercedes-AMG GT3 Evo | 55 | +6 Laps |
| 28 | GTD | 75 | SunEnergy1 | (Australia) Kenny Habul (Italy) Raffaele Marciello | Mercedes-AMG M159 6.2 L V8 | 55 | +6 Laps |
| 29 | GTD | 32 | Gilbert Korthoff Racing | (United States) Mike Skeen (United States) Guy Cosmo | Mercedes-AMG GT3 Evo | 55 | +6 Laps |
| 29 | GTD | 32 | Gilbert Korthoff Racing | (United States) Mike Skeen (United States) Guy Cosmo | Mercedes-AMG M159 6.2 L V8 | 55 | +6 Laps |
| 30 | GTD Pro | 3 | Corvette Racing | (Spain) Antonio García (United States) Jordan Taylor | Chevrolet Corvette C8.R GTD | 55 | +6 Laps |
| 30 | GTD Pro | 3 | Corvette Racing | (Spain) Antonio García (United States) Jordan Taylor | Chevrolet 5.5 L V8 | 55 | +6 Laps |
| 31 | GTD | 28 | Alegra Motorsports | (United States) Michael de Quesada (Sweden) Linus Lundqvist | Mercedes-AMG GT3 Evo | 55 | +6 Laps |
| 31 | GTD | 28 | Alegra Motorsports | (United States) Michael de Quesada (Sweden) Linus Lundqvist | Mercedes-AMG M159 6.2 L V8 | 55 | +6 Laps |
| 32 | GTD | 70 | Inception Racing | (United States) Brendan Iribe (United Kingdom) Ollie Millroy | McLaren 720S GT3 | 55 | +6 Laps |
| 32 | GTD | 70 | Inception Racing | (United States) Brendan Iribe (United Kingdom) Ollie Millroy | McLaren M840T 4.0 L Turbo V8 | 55 | +6 Laps |
| 33 | LMP3 | 7 | Forty7 Motorsports | (United States) Mark Kvamme (France) Antoine Doquin | Duqueine M30 - D08 | 55 | +6 Laps |
| 33 | LMP3 | 7 | Forty7 Motorsports | (United States) Mark Kvamme (France) Antoine Doquin | Nissan VK56DE 5.6L V8 | 55 | +6 Laps |
| 34 | GTD | 39 | CarBahn with Peregrine Racing | (United States) Robert Megennis (United Kingdom) Sandy Mitchell | Lamborghini Huracán GT3 Evo | 55 | +6 Laps |
| 34 | GTD | 39 | CarBahn with Peregrine Racing | (United States) Robert Megennis (United Kingdom) Sandy Mitchell | Lamborghini 5.2 L V10 | 55 | +6 Laps |
| 35 | GTD Pro | 4 | Corvette Racing | (United States) Tommy Milner (Denmark) Marco Sørensen | Chevrolet Corvette C8.R GTD | 55 | +6 Laps |
| 35 | GTD Pro | 4 | Corvette Racing | (United States) Tommy Milner (Denmark) Marco Sørensen | Chevrolet 5.5 L V8 | 55 | +6 Laps |
| 36 | GTD Pro | 79 | WeatherTech Racing | (France) Julien Andlauer (Belgium) Alessio Picariello | Porsche 911 GT3 R | 55 | +6 Laps^{1} |
| 36 | GTD Pro | 79 | WeatherTech Racing | (France) Julien Andlauer (Belgium) Alessio Picariello | Porsche MA1.76/MDGG.G 4.0 L Flat 6 | 55 | +6 Laps^{1} |
| 37 | GTD Pro | 97 | WeatherTech Racing | (Germany) Maro Engel (France) Jules Gounon | Mercedes-AMG GT3 Evo | 55 | +6 Laps^{2} |
| 37 | GTD Pro | 97 | WeatherTech Racing | (Germany) Maro Engel (France) Jules Gounon | Mercedes-AMG M159 6.2 L V8 | 55 | +6 Laps^{2} |
| 38 | GTD | 44 | Magnus Racing | (United States) John Potter (United States) Andy Lally | Aston Martin Vantage AMR GT3 | 55 | +6 Laps |
| 38 | GTD | 44 | Magnus Racing | (United States) John Potter (United States) Andy Lally | Aston Martin 4.0 L Turbo V8 | 55 | +6 Laps |
| 39 | GTD | 98 | Northwest AMR | (Canada) Paul Dalla Lana (United Kingdom) David Pittard | Aston Martin Vantage AMR GT3 | 55 | +6 Laps |
| 39 | GTD | 98 | Northwest AMR | (Canada) Paul Dalla Lana (United Kingdom) David Pittard | Aston Martin 4.0 L Turbo V8 | 55 | +6 Laps |
| 40 | GTD Pro | 2 | KCMG | (France) Patrick Pilet (Switzerland) Alexandre Imperatori | Porsche 911 GT3 R | 55 | +6 Laps |
| 40 | GTD Pro | 2 | KCMG | (France) Patrick Pilet (Switzerland) Alexandre Imperatori | Porsche MA1.76/MDGG.G 4.0 L Flat 6 | 55 | +6 Laps |
| 41 | GTD | 16 | Wright Motorsports | (United States) Ryan Hardwick (Belgium) Jan Heylen | Porsche 911 GT3 R | 55 | +6 Laps^{3} |
| 41 | GTD | 16 | Wright Motorsports | (United States) Ryan Hardwick (Belgium) Jan Heylen | Porsche MA1.76/MDGG.G 4.0 L Flat 6 | 55 | +6 Laps^{3} |
| 42 | GTD | 47 | Cetilar Racing | (Italy) Roberto Lacorte (Italy) Alessio Rovera | Ferrari 488 GT3 Evo 2020 | 55 | +6 Laps |
| 42 | GTD | 47 | Cetilar Racing | (Italy) Roberto Lacorte (Italy) Alessio Rovera | Ferrari F154CB 3.9 L Turbo V8 | 55 | +6 Laps |
| 43 | GTD Pro | 62 | Risi Competizione | (Brazil) Daniel Serra (Italy) Davide Rigon | Ferrari 488 GT3 Evo 2020 | 55 | +6 Laps |
| 43 | GTD Pro | 62 | Risi Competizione | (Brazil) Daniel Serra (Italy) Davide Rigon | Ferrari F154CB 3.9 L Turbo V8 | 55 | +6 Laps |
| 44 | GTD Pro | 25 | BMW Team RLL | (United States) Connor De Phillippi (United States) John Edwards | BMW M4 GT3 | 55 | +6 Laps |
| 44 | GTD Pro | 25 | BMW Team RLL | (United States) Connor De Phillippi (United States) John Edwards | BMW S58B30T0 3.0 L Twin-Turbo I6 | 55 | +6 Laps |
| 45 | GTD | 19 | TR3 Racing | (United States) John Megrue (United States) Jeff Segal | Lamborghini Huracán GT3 Evo | 55 | +6 Laps |
| 45 | GTD | 19 | TR3 Racing | (United States) John Megrue (United States) Jeff Segal | Lamborghini 5.2 L V10 | 55 | +6 Laps |
| 46 | GTD Pro | 24 | BMW Team RLL | (United Kingdom) Nick Yelloly (South Africa) Sheldon van der Linde | BMW M4 GT3 | 55 | +6 Laps |
| 46 | GTD Pro | 24 | BMW Team RLL | (United Kingdom) Nick Yelloly (South Africa) Sheldon van der Linde | BMW S58B30T0 3.0 L Twin Turbo I6 | 55 | +6 Laps |
| 47 | GTD | 99 | Team Hardpoint | (United Kingdom) Stefan Wilson (United States) Nick Boulle | Porsche 911 GT3 R | 55 | +6 Laps |
| 47 | GTD | 99 | Team Hardpoint | (United Kingdom) Stefan Wilson (United States) Nick Boulle | Porsche MA1.76/MDGG.G 4.0 L Flat 6 | 55 | +6 Laps |
| 48 | GTD | 34 | GMG Racing | (United States) Kyle Washington (Austria) Klaus Bachler | Porsche 911 GT3 R | 55 | +6 Laps |
| 48 | GTD | 34 | GMG Racing | (United States) Kyle Washington (Austria) Klaus Bachler | Porsche MA1.76/MDGG.G 4.0 L Flat 6 | 55 | +6 Laps |
| 49 | GTD | 66 | Gradient Racing | (Barbados) Kyffin Simpson (United Kingdom) Till Bechtolsheimer | Acura NSX GT3 Evo22 | 55 | +6 Laps |
| 49 | GTD | 66 | Gradient Racing | (Barbados) Kyffin Simpson (United Kingdom) Till Bechtolsheimer | Acura 3.5 L Turbo V6 | 55 | +6 Laps |
| 50 | GTD | 21 | AF Corse | (Argentina) Luís Pérez Companc (Finland) Toni Vilander | Ferrari 488 GT3 Evo 2020 | 54 | +7 Laps |
| 50 | GTD | 21 | AF Corse | (Argentina) Luís Pérez Companc (Finland) Toni Vilander | Ferrari F154CB 3.9 L Turbo V8 | 54 | +7 Laps |
| 51 | LMP3 | 33 | Sean Creech Motorsport | (Portugal) João Barbosa (United States) Lance Willsey | Ligier JS P320 | 54 | +7 Laps |
| 51 | LMP3 | 33 | Sean Creech Motorsport | (Portugal) João Barbosa (United States) Lance Willsey | Nissan VK56DE 5.6L V8 | 54 | +7 Laps |
| 52 | GTD | 42 | NTE Sport | (United States) Don Yount (Chile) Benjamín Hites | Lamborghini Huracán GT3 Evo | 53 | +8 Laps |
| 52 | GTD | 42 | NTE Sport | (United States) Don Yount (Chile) Benjamín Hites | Lamborghini 5.2 L V10 | 53 | +8 Laps |
| 53 | LMP3 | 26 | Mühlner Motorsports America | (Australia) Cameron Shields (Belgium) Ugo de Wilde | Duqueine M30 - D08 | 53 | +8 Laps |
| 53 | LMP3 | 26 | Mühlner Motorsports America | (Australia) Cameron Shields (Belgium) Ugo de Wilde | Nissan VK56DE 5.6L V8 | 53 | +8 Laps |
| 54 DNF | GTD | 64 | Team TGM | (United States) Ted Giovanis (United States) Owen Trinkler | Porsche 911 GT3 R | 45 | Not running |
| 54 DNF | GTD | 64 | Team TGM | (United States) Ted Giovanis (United States) Owen Trinkler | Porsche MA1.76/MDGG.G 4.0 L Flat 6 | 45 | Not running |
| 55 DNF | LMP2 | 18 | Era Motorsport | (United States) Dwight Merriman (France) Paul-Loup Chatin | Oreca 07 | 38 | Not running |
| 55 DNF | LMP2 | 18 | Era Motorsport | (United States) Dwight Merriman (France) Paul-Loup Chatin | Gibson Technology GK428 4.2 L V8 | 38 | Not running |
| 56 DNF | GTD | 96 | Turner Motorsport | (United States) Robby Foley (United States) Bill Auberlen | BMW M4 GT3 | 28 | Not running |
| 56 DNF | GTD | 96 | Turner Motorsport | (United States) Robby Foley (United States) Bill Auberlen | BMW S58B30T0 3.0 L Twin Turbo I6 | 28 | Not running |
| 57 DNF | GTD | 27 | Heart of Racing Team | (Canada) Roman De Angelis (United Kingdom) Tom Gamble | Aston Martin Vantage AMR GT3 | 27 | Not running |
| 57 DNF | GTD | 27 | Heart of Racing Team | (Canada) Roman De Angelis (United Kingdom) Tom Gamble | Aston Martin 4.0 L Turbo V8 | 27 | Not running |
| 58 DNF | LMP3 | 38 | Performance Tech Motorsports | (Japan) Hikaru Abe (Chile) Nico Pino | Ligier JS P320 | 22 | Not running |
| 58 DNF | LMP3 | 38 | Performance Tech Motorsports | (Japan) Hikaru Abe (Chile) Nico Pino | Nissan VK56DE 5.6L V8 | 22 | Not running |
| 59 DNF | GTD | 71 | T3 Motorsport North America | (France) Franck Perera (Canada) Misha Goikhberg | Lamborghini Huracán GT3 Evo | 16 | Not running |
| 59 DNF | GTD | 71 | T3 Motorsport North America | (France) Franck Perera (Canada) Misha Goikhberg | Lamborghini 5.2 L V10 | 16 | Not running |
| 60 DNF | LMP3 | 74 | Riley Motorsports | (United States) Gar Robinson (Brazil) Felipe Fraga | Ligier JS P320 | 5 | Not running |
| 60 DNF | LMP3 | 74 | Riley Motorsports | (United States) Gar Robinson (Brazil) Felipe Fraga | Nissan VK56DE 5.6L V8 | 5 | Not running |
| DNS | LMP3 | 54 | CORE Autosport | (United States) Jon Bennett (United States) George Kurtz | Ligier JS P320 | 0 | Did not start |
| DNS | LMP3 | 54 | CORE Autosport | (United States) Jon Bennett (United States) George Kurtz | Nissan VK56DE 5.6L V8 | 0 | Did not start |

- ^{1} The #79 WeatherTech Racing entry received a post-race 50 second time penalty for failure to adhere to mandated tire operational requirements.
- ^{2} The #97 WeatherTech Racing entry received a post-race 50 second time penalty for failure to adhere to mandated tire operational requirements.
- ^{3} The #16 Wright Motorsports entry received a post-race 50 second time penalty for failure to adhere to mandated tire operational requirements.

== Post-race ==
Since it was the season's first race, Blomqvist, Jarvis, Castroneves, and Pagenaud led the DPi Drivers' Championship with 378 points each. Albuquerque, Ricky Taylor, Stevens, and Rossi were second with 355 points each. Vautier, Westbrook, Duval, and Keating were third with 332 points. Campbell, Jaminet, and Nasr led the GTD Pro Drivers' Championship with 382 points each. Rigon, Serra, Calado, and Pier Giudi were second with 340 points. Imperatori, Olsen, Pilet, and Vanthoor were third with 321 points. Hardwick, Heylen, Robichon, and Lietz led the GTD Drivers' Championship, followed by the second-placed Lally, Potter, Pumpelly, and Adam. McAleer, Skeen, Andrews, and Davidson were third. LMP2 drivers and teams as well as LMP3 drivers and teams didn't score full season points due to the event only counting towards the Michelin Endurance Cup. Meyer Shank Racing w/ Curb-Agajanian, Pfaff Motorsports, and Wright Motorsports became the leaders of their respective class Teams' Championships. Acura, and Porsche assumed the lead of their respective Manufacturers' Championships with eleven races left in the season.

=== Results ===
Class winners denoted in bold and with ‡

| Pos | Class | No. | Team / Entrant | Drivers | Chassis | Laps | Time/Retired |
| Pos | Class | No. | Team / Entrant | Drivers | Engine | Laps | Time/Retired |
|---|---|---|---|---|---|---|---|
| 1 | **DPi** | **60** | **(United States) Meyer Shank Racing w/ Curb-Agajanian** | **(United Kingdom) Tom Blomqvist (Brazil) Hélio Castroneves (United Kingdom) Oliver Jarvis (France) Simon Pagenaud** | **Acura ARX-05** | **761** | **24:00:23.026‡** |
| 1 | **DPi** | **60** | **(United States) Meyer Shank Racing w/ Curb-Agajanian** | **(United Kingdom) Tom Blomqvist (Brazil) Hélio Castroneves (United Kingdom) Oliver Jarvis (France) Simon Pagenaud** | **Acura AR35TT 3.5 L Turbo V6** | **761** | **24:00:23.026‡** |
| 2 | DPi | 10 | (United States) Konica Minolta Acura | (Portugal) Filipe Albuquerque (United States) Alexander Rossi (United Kingdom) Will Stevens (United States) Ricky Taylor | Acura ARX-05 | 761 | +3.028 |
| 2 | DPi | 10 | (United States) Konica Minolta Acura | (Portugal) Filipe Albuquerque (United States) Alexander Rossi (United Kingdom) Will Stevens (United States) Ricky Taylor | Acura AR35TT 3.5 L Turbo V6 | 761 | +3.028 |
| 3 | DPi | 5 | (United States) JDC-Miller MotorSports | (France) Loïc Duval (United States) Ben Keating (France) Tristan Vautier (United Kingdom) Richard Westbrook | Cadillac DPi-V.R | 761 | +4.420 |
| 3 | DPi | 5 | (United States) JDC-Miller MotorSports | (France) Loïc Duval (United States) Ben Keating (France) Tristan Vautier (United Kingdom) Richard Westbrook | Cadillac 5.5 L V8 | 761 | +4.420 |
| 4 | DPi | 31 | (United States) Whelen Engineering Racing | (United Kingdom) Mike Conway (Brazil) Pipo Derani (United States) Tristan Nunez | Cadillac DPi-V.R | 761 | +5.615 |
| 4 | DPi | 31 | (United States) Whelen Engineering Racing | (United Kingdom) Mike Conway (Brazil) Pipo Derani (United States) Tristan Nunez | Cadillac 5.5 L V8 | 761 | +5.615 |
| 5 | **LMP2** | **81** | **(United States) DragonSpeed USA** | **(Canada) Devlin DeFrancesco (United States) Colton Herta (United States) Eric Lux (Mexico) Pato O'Ward** | **Oreca 07** | **751** | **+10 Laps‡** |
| 5 | **LMP2** | **81** | **(United States) DragonSpeed USA** | **(Canada) Devlin DeFrancesco (United States) Colton Herta (United States) Eric Lux (Mexico) Pato O'Ward** | **Gibson GK428 4.2 L V8** | **751** | **+10 Laps‡** |
| 6 | LMP2 | 29 | (Netherlands) Racing Team Nederland | (Netherlands) Frits van Eerd (Netherlands) Giedo van der Garde (United States) Dylan Murry (Netherlands) Rinus VeeKay | Oreca 07 | 751 | +10 Laps |
| 6 | LMP2 | 29 | (Netherlands) Racing Team Nederland | (Netherlands) Frits van Eerd (Netherlands) Giedo van der Garde (United States) Dylan Murry (Netherlands) Rinus VeeKay | Gibson GK428 4.2 L V8 | 751 | +10 Laps |
| 7 | LMP2 | 8 | (United States) Tower Motorsport | (Portugal) Rui Andrade (Switzerland) Louis Delétraz (Canada) John Farano (Austria) Ferdinand Habsburg-Lothringen | Oreca 07 | 751 | +10 Laps |
| 7 | LMP2 | 8 | (United States) Tower Motorsport | (Portugal) Rui Andrade (Switzerland) Louis Delétraz (Canada) John Farano (Austria) Ferdinand Habsburg-Lothringen | Gibson GK428 4.2 L V8 | 751 | +10 Laps |
| 8 | LMP2 | 52 | (United States) PR1/Mathiasen Motorsports | (United States) Scott Huffaker (Denmark) Mikkel Jensen (United States) Ben Keating (France) Nicolas Lapierre | Oreca 07 | 751 | +10 Laps |
| 8 | LMP2 | 52 | (United States) PR1/Mathiasen Motorsports | (United States) Scott Huffaker (Denmark) Mikkel Jensen (United States) Ben Keating (France) Nicolas Lapierre | Gibson GK428 4.2 L V8 | 751 | +10 Laps |
| 9 | LMP2 | 68 | (Russia) G-Drive Racing by APR | (France) François Heriau (United Arab Emirates) Ed Jones (Denmark) Oliver Rasmussen (Germany) René Rast | Aurus 01 | 744 | +17 Laps |
| 9 | LMP2 | 68 | (Russia) G-Drive Racing by APR | (France) François Heriau (United Arab Emirates) Ed Jones (Denmark) Oliver Rasmussen (Germany) René Rast | Gibson GK428 4.2 L V8 | 744 | +17 Laps |
| 10 | LMP2 | 22 | (United Kingdom) United Autosports | (United Kingdom) Phil Hanson (United States) James McGuire (United States) Will Owen (United Kingdom) Guy Smith | Oreca 07 | 740 | +21 Laps |
| 10 | LMP2 | 22 | (United Kingdom) United Autosports | (United Kingdom) Phil Hanson (United States) James McGuire (United States) Will Owen (United Kingdom) Guy Smith | Gibson GK428 4.2 L V8 | 740 | +21 Laps |
| 11 | DPi | 48 | (United States) Ally Cadillac Racing | (United States) Jimmie Johnson (Japan) Kamui Kobayashi (Argentina) José María López (Germany) Mike Rockenfeller | Cadillac DPi-V.R | 739 | +22 Laps |
| 11 | DPi | 48 | (United States) Ally Cadillac Racing | (United States) Jimmie Johnson (Japan) Kamui Kobayashi (Argentina) José María López (Germany) Mike Rockenfeller | Cadillac 5.5 L V8 | 739 | +22 Laps |
| 12 | DPi | 02 | (United States) Cadillac Racing | (New Zealand) Earl Bamber (Sweden) Marcus Ericsson (United Kingdom) Alex Lynn (Denmark) Kevin Magnussen | Cadillac DPi-V.R | 734 | +27 Laps |
| 12 | DPi | 02 | (United States) Cadillac Racing | (New Zealand) Earl Bamber (Sweden) Marcus Ericsson (United Kingdom) Alex Lynn (Denmark) Kevin Magnussen | Cadillac 5.5 L V8 engine | 734 | +27 Laps |
| 13 | **LMP3** | **74** | **(United States) Riley Motorsports** | **(Netherlands) Kay van Berlo (United States) Michael Cooper (Brazil) Felipe Fraga (United States) Gar Robinson** | **Ligier JS P320** | **723** | **+38 Laps‡** |
| 13 | **LMP3** | **74** | **(United States) Riley Motorsports** | **(Netherlands) Kay van Berlo (United States) Michael Cooper (Brazil) Felipe Fraga (United States) Gar Robinson** | **Nissan VK56DE 5.6 L V8** | **723** | **+38 Laps‡** |
| 14 | DPi | 01 | (United States) Cadillac Racing | (France) Sébastien Bourdais (New Zealand) Scott Dixon (Spain) Álex Palou (Netherlands) Renger van der Zande | Cadillac DPi-V.R | 722 | +39 Laps |
| 14 | DPi | 01 | (United States) Cadillac Racing | (France) Sébastien Bourdais (New Zealand) Scott Dixon (Spain) Álex Palou (Netherlands) Renger van der Zande | Cadillac 5.5 L V8 | 722 | +39 Laps |
| 15 | LMP3 | 33 | (United States) Sean Creech Motorsport | (Portugal) João Barbosa (Denmark) Malthe Jakobsen (Guernsey) Sebastian Priaulx (United States) Lance Willsey | Ligier JS P320 | 722 | +39 Laps |
| 15 | LMP3 | 33 | (United States) Sean Creech Motorsport | (Portugal) João Barbosa (Denmark) Malthe Jakobsen (Guernsey) Sebastian Priaulx (United States) Lance Willsey | Nissan VK56DE 5.6 L V8 | 722 | +39 Laps |
| 16 | LMP3 | 54 | (United States) CORE Autosport | (United States) Jon Bennett (United States) Colin Braun (Sweden) Niclas Jönsson (United States) George Kurtz | Ligier JS P320 | 721 | +40 Laps |
| 16 | LMP3 | 54 | (United States) CORE Autosport | (United States) Jon Bennett (United States) Colin Braun (Sweden) Niclas Jönsson (United States) George Kurtz | Nissan VK56DE 5.6 L V8 | 721 | +40 Laps |
| 17 | LMP3 | 36 | (United States) Andretti Autosport | (United States) Jarett Andretti (Australia) Josh Burdon (Colombia) Gabby Chaves (Sweden) Rasmus Lindh | Ligier JS P320 | 719 | +42 Laps |
| 17 | LMP3 | 36 | (United States) Andretti Autosport | (United States) Jarett Andretti (Australia) Josh Burdon (Colombia) Gabby Chaves (Sweden) Rasmus Lindh | Nissan VK56DE 5.6 L V8 | 719 | +42 Laps |
| 18 | **GTD; Pro** | **9** | **(Canada) Pfaff Motorsports** | **(Australia) Matt Campbell (France) Mathieu Jaminet (Brazil) Felipe Nasr** | **Porsche 911 GT3 R** | **711** | **+50 Laps‡** |
| 18 | **GTD; Pro** | **9** | **(Canada) Pfaff Motorsports** | **(Australia) Matt Campbell (France) Mathieu Jaminet (Brazil) Felipe Nasr** | **Porsche MA1.76/MDG.G 4.0 L Flat-6 engine** | **711** | **+50 Laps‡** |
| 19 | GTD; Pro | 62 | (United States) Risi Competizione | (United Kingdom) James Calado (Italy) Alessandro Pier Guidi (Italy) Davide Rigon (Brazil) Daniel Serra | Ferrari 488 GT3 Evo 2020 | 711 | +50 Laps |
| 19 | GTD; Pro | 62 | (United States) Risi Competizione | (United Kingdom) James Calado (Italy) Alessandro Pier Guidi (Italy) Davide Rigon (Brazil) Daniel Serra | Ferrari F154CB 3.9 L Turbo V8 | 711 | +50 Laps |
| 20 | GTD; Pro | 2 | (Hong Kong) KCMG | (Switzerland) Alexandre Imperatori (Norway) Dennis Olsen (France) Patrick Pilet (Belgium) Laurens Vanthoor | Porsche 911 GT3 R | 711 | +50 Laps |
| 20 | GTD; Pro | 2 | (Hong Kong) KCMG | (Switzerland) Alexandre Imperatori (Norway) Dennis Olsen (France) Patrick Pilet (Belgium) Laurens Vanthoor | Porsche MA1.76/MDG.G 4.0 L Flat-6 engine | 711 | +50 Laps |
| 21 | GTD; Pro | 14 | (United States) VasserSullivan | (United Kingdom) Ben Barnicoat (United Kingdom) Jack Hawksworth (United States) Kyle Kirkwood | Lexus RC F GT3 | 711 | +50 Laps |
| 21 | GTD; Pro | 14 | (United States) VasserSullivan | (United Kingdom) Ben Barnicoat (United Kingdom) Jack Hawksworth (United States) Kyle Kirkwood | Toyota 2UR 5.0 L V8 | 711 | +50 Laps |
| 22 | GTD; Pro | 15 | (Germany) Proton USA | (Germany) Patrick Assenheimer (United States) Austin Cindric (Germany) Dirk Müller | Mercedes-AMG GT3 Evo | 709 | +52 Laps |
| 22 | GTD; Pro | 15 | (Germany) Proton USA | (Germany) Patrick Assenheimer (United States) Austin Cindric (Germany) Dirk Müller | Mercedes-AMG M159 6.2 L V8 | 709 | +52 Laps |
| 23 | **GTD** | **16** | **(United States) Wright Motorsports** | **(United States) Ryan Hardwick (Belgium) Jan Heylen (Austria) Richard Lietz (Canada) Zacharie Robichon** | **Porsche 911 GT3 R** | **707** | **+54 Laps‡** |
| 23 | **GTD** | **16** | **(United States) Wright Motorsports** | **(United States) Ryan Hardwick (Belgium) Jan Heylen (Austria) Richard Lietz (Canada) Zacharie Robichon** | **Porsche MA1.76/MDG.G 4.0 L Flat-6 engine** | **707** | **+54 Laps‡** |
| 24 | GTD | 44 | (United States) Magnus Racing | (United Kingdom) Jonathan Adam (United States) Andy Lally (United States) John Potter (United States) Spencer Pumpelly | Aston Martin Vantage AMR GT3 | 707 | +54 Laps |
| 24 | GTD | 44 | (United States) Magnus Racing | (United Kingdom) Jonathan Adam (United States) Andy Lally (United States) John Potter (United States) Spencer Pumpelly | Aston Martin 4.0 L Turbo V8 | 707 | +54 Laps |
| 25 | GTD | 32 | (United States) Gilbert Korthoff Motorsports | (Australia) Scott Andrews (Australia) James Davison (United Kingdom) Stevan McAleer (United States) Mike Skeen | Mercedes-AMG GT3 Evo | 707 | +54 Laps |
| 25 | GTD | 32 | (United States) Gilbert Korthoff Motorsports | (Australia) Scott Andrews (Australia) James Davison (United Kingdom) Stevan McAleer (United States) Mike Skeen | Mercedes-AMG M159 6.2 L V8 | 707 | +54 Laps |
| 26 | GTD | 21 | (Italy) AF Corse | (Argentina) Luís Pérez Companc (United Kingdom) Simon Mann (Denmark) Nicklas Nielsen (Finland) Toni Vilander | Ferrari 488 GT3 Evo 2020 | 707 | +54 Laps |
| 26 | GTD | 21 | (Italy) AF Corse | (Argentina) Luís Pérez Companc (United Kingdom) Simon Mann (Denmark) Nicklas Nielsen (Finland) Toni Vilander | Ferrari F154CB 3.9 L Turbo V8 | 707 | +54 Laps |
| 27 | GTD | 70 | (United Kingdom) Inception Racing | (United States) Brendan Iribe (United Kingdom) Ollie Millroy (South Africa) Jordan Pepper (Denmark) Frederik Schandorff | McLaren 720S GT3 | 705 | +56 Laps |
| 27 | GTD | 70 | (United Kingdom) Inception Racing | (United States) Brendan Iribe (United Kingdom) Ollie Millroy (South Africa) Jordan Pepper (Denmark) Frederik Schandorff | McLaren M840T 4.0 L Turbo V8 | 705 | +56 Laps |
| 28 | GTD | 57 | (United States) Winward Racing | (Austria) Lucas Auer (United Kingdom) Philip Ellis (Canada) Mikaël Grenier (United States) Russell Ward | Mercedes-AMG GT3 Evo | 699 | +62 Laps |
| 28 | GTD | 57 | (United States) Winward Racing | (Austria) Lucas Auer (United Kingdom) Philip Ellis (Canada) Mikaël Grenier (United States) Russell Ward | Mercedes-AMG M159 6.2 L V8 | 699 | +62 Laps |
| 29 | GTD; Pro | 3 | (United States) Corvette Racing | (Netherlands) Nicky Catsburg (Spain) Antonio García (United States) Jordan Taylor | Chevrolet Corvette C8.R GTD | 698 | +63 Laps |
| 29 | GTD; Pro | 3 | (United States) Corvette Racing | (Netherlands) Nicky Catsburg (Spain) Antonio García (United States) Jordan Taylor | Chevrolet 5.5 L V8 | 698 | +63 Laps |
| 30 | GTD; Pro | 25 | (United States) BMW Team RLL | (United States) John Edwards (Brazil) Augusto Farfus (Finland) Jesse Krohn (United States) Connor De Phillippi | BMW M4 GT3 | 698 | +63 Laps |
| 30 | GTD; Pro | 25 | (United States) BMW Team RLL | (United States) John Edwards (Brazil) Augusto Farfus (Finland) Jesse Krohn (United States) Connor De Phillippi | BMW S58B30T0 3.0 L Twin Turbo I6 | 698 | +63 Laps |
| 31 | GTD | 64 | (United States) Team TGM | (United States) Ted Giovanis (United States) Hugh Plumb (United States) Matt Plumb (United States) Owen Trinkler | Porsche 911 GT3 R | 697 | +64 Laps |
| 31 | GTD | 64 | (United States) Team TGM | (United States) Ted Giovanis (United States) Hugh Plumb (United States) Matt Plumb (United States) Owen Trinkler | Porsche MA1.76/MDG.G 4.0 L Flat-6 engine | 697 | +64 Laps |
| 32 | LMP3 | 13 | (Canada) AWA | (United Kingdom) Matthew Bell (Canada) Orey Fidani (Germany) Lars Kern (Canada) Kuno Wittmer | Duqueine M30 - D08 | 695 | +66 Laps |
| 32 | LMP3 | 13 | (Canada) AWA | (United Kingdom) Matthew Bell (Canada) Orey Fidani (Germany) Lars Kern (Canada) Kuno Wittmer | Nissan VK56DE 5.6 L V8 | 695 | +66 Laps |
| 33 | GTD | 71 | (Germany) T3 Motorsport North America | (Canada) Misha Goikhberg (Guatemala) Mateo Llarena (Germany) Maximilian Paul (France) Franck Perera | Lamborghini Huracán GT3 Evo | 692 | +69 Laps |
| 33 | GTD | 71 | (Germany) T3 Motorsport North America | (Canada) Misha Goikhberg (Guatemala) Mateo Llarena (Germany) Maximilian Paul (France) Franck Perera | Lamborghini 5.2 L V10 | 692 | +69 Laps |
| 34 | GTD | 27 | (United States) Heart of Racing Team | (Canada) Roman De Angelis (United Kingdom) Tom Gamble (United Kingdom) Ian James (United Kingdom) Darren Turner | Aston Martin Vantage AMR GT3 | 688 | +73 Laps |
| 34 | GTD | 27 | (United States) Heart of Racing Team | (Canada) Roman De Angelis (United Kingdom) Tom Gamble (United Kingdom) Ian James (United Kingdom) Darren Turner | Aston Martin 4.0 L Turbo V8 | 688 | +73 Laps |
| 35 | LMP3 | 26 | (Belgium) Mühlner Motorsports America | (United States) Charles Crews (Australia) Cameron Shields (United States) Nolan Siegel (Belgium) Ugo de Wilde | Duqueine M30 - D08 | 681 | +80 Laps |
| 35 | LMP3 | 26 | (Belgium) Mühlner Motorsports America | (United States) Charles Crews (Australia) Cameron Shields (United States) Nolan Siegel (Belgium) Ugo de Wilde | Nissan VK56DE 5.6 L V8 | 681 | +80 Laps |
| 36 | GTD; Pro | 79 | (United States) WeatherTech Racing | (France) Julien Andlauer (Italy) Matteo Cairoli (United States) Cooper MacNeil (Belgium) Alessio Picariello | Porsche 911 GT3 R | 673 | +88 Laps |
| 36 | GTD; Pro | 79 | (United States) WeatherTech Racing | (France) Julien Andlauer (Italy) Matteo Cairoli (United States) Cooper MacNeil (Belgium) Alessio Picariello | Porsche MA1.76/MDG.G 4.0 L Flat-6 engine | 673 | +88 Laps |
| 37 | GTD | 99 | (United States) Team Hardpoint | (United States) Nick Boulle (United States) Rob Ferriol (United Kingdom) Katherine Legge (United Kingdom) Stefan Wilson | Porsche 911 GT3 R | 672 | +89 Laps |
| 37 | GTD | 99 | (United States) Team Hardpoint | (United States) Nick Boulle (United States) Rob Ferriol (United Kingdom) Katherine Legge (United Kingdom) Stefan Wilson | Porsche MA1.76/MDG.G 4.0 L Flat-6 engine | 672 | +89 Laps |
| 38 DNF | GTD | 19 | (United States) TR3 Racing | (Italy) Giacomo Altoè (United States) John Megrue (United States) Jeff Segal (United States) Bill Sweedler | Lamborghini Huracán GT3 Evo | 669 | Mechanical |
| 38 DNF | GTD | 19 | (United States) TR3 Racing | (Italy) Giacomo Altoè (United States) John Megrue (United States) Jeff Segal (United States) Bill Sweedler | Lamborghini 5.2 L V10 | 669 | Mechanical |
| 39 | GTD | 98 | (Canada) Northwest AMR | (Republic of Ireland) Charlie Eastwood (Canada) Paul Dalla Lana (United Kingdom) David Pittard (Denmark) Nicki Thiim | Aston Martin Vantage AMR GT3 | 667 | +94 Laps |
| 39 | GTD | 98 | (Canada) Northwest AMR | (Republic of Ireland) Charlie Eastwood (Canada) Paul Dalla Lana (United Kingdom) David Pittard (Denmark) Nicki Thiim | Aston Martin 4.0 L Turbo V8 | 667 | +94 Laps |
| 40 | GTD; Pro | 24 | (United States) BMW Team RLL | (Austria) Philipp Eng (South Africa) Sheldon van der Linde (Germany) Marco Wittmann (United Kingdom) Nick Yelloly | BMW M4 GT3 | 665 | +96 Laps |
| 40 | GTD; Pro | 24 | (United States) BMW Team RLL | (Austria) Philipp Eng (South Africa) Sheldon van der Linde (Germany) Marco Wittmann (United Kingdom) Nick Yelloly | BMW S58B30T0 3.0 L Twin Turbo I6 | 665 | +96 Laps |
| 41 DNF | LMP2 | 11 | (United States) PR1/Mathiasen Motorsports | (United States) Jonathan Bomarito (United States) Josh Pierson (United States) Steven Thomas (United Kingdom) Harry Tincknell | Oreca 07 | 663 | Mechanical |
| 41 DNF | LMP2 | 11 | (United States) PR1/Mathiasen Motorsports | (United States) Jonathan Bomarito (United States) Josh Pierson (United States) Steven Thomas (United Kingdom) Harry Tincknell | Gibson GK428 4.2 L V8 | 663 | Mechanical |
| 42 | GTD | 66 | (United States) Gradient Racing | (United Kingdom) Till Bechtolsheimer (Germany) Mario Farnbacher (United States) Marc Miller (Barbados) Kyffin Simpson | Acura NSX GT3 Evo22 | 659 | +102 Laps |
| 42 | GTD | 66 | (United States) Gradient Racing | (United Kingdom) Till Bechtolsheimer (Germany) Mario Farnbacher (United States) Marc Miller (Barbados) Kyffin Simpson | Acura 3.5 L Turbo V6 | 659 | +102 Laps |
| 43 | GTD | 47 | (Italy) Cetilar Racing | (Italy) Antonio Fuoco (Italy) Roberto Lacorte (Italy) Alessio Rovera (Italy) Giorgio Sernagiotto | Ferrari 488 GT3 Evo 2020 | 652 | +109 Laps |
| 43 | GTD | 47 | (Italy) Cetilar Racing | (Italy) Antonio Fuoco (Italy) Roberto Lacorte (Italy) Alessio Rovera (Italy) Giorgio Sernagiotto | Ferrari F154CB 3.9 L Turbo V8 | 652 | +109 Laps |
| 44 | GTD | 12 | (United States) VasserSullivan | (United States) Townsend Bell (United States) Richard Heistand (United States) Frankie Montecalvo (United States) Aaron Telitz | Lexus RC F GT3 | 634 | +127 Laps |
| 44 | GTD | 12 | (United States) VasserSullivan | (United States) Townsend Bell (United States) Richard Heistand (United States) Frankie Montecalvo (United States) Aaron Telitz | Toyota 2UR 5.0 L V8 | 634 | +127 Laps |
| 45 | GTD; Pro | 4 | (United States) Corvette Racing | (United States) Tommy Milner (Denmark) Marco Sørensen (United Kingdom) Nick Tandy | Chevrolet Corvette C8.R GTD | 626 | +135 Laps |
| 45 | GTD; Pro | 4 | (United States) Corvette Racing | (United States) Tommy Milner (Denmark) Marco Sørensen (United Kingdom) Nick Tandy | Chevrolet 5.5 L V8 | 626 | +135 Laps |
| 46 DNF | LMP3 | 38 | (United States) Performance Tech Motorsports | (Japan) Hikaru Abe (Canada) Garett Grist (United States) Daniel Goldburg (Chile) Nico Pino | Ligier JS P320 | 588 | Drivetrain |
| 46 DNF | LMP3 | 38 | (United States) Performance Tech Motorsports | (Japan) Hikaru Abe (Canada) Garett Grist (United States) Daniel Goldburg (Chile) Nico Pino | Nissan VK56DE 5.6 L V8 | 588 | Drivetrain |
| 47 DNF | LMP2 | 69 | (Russia) G-Drive Racing with APR | (Australia) James Allen (United States) John Falb (Italy) Luca Ghiotto (Netherlands) Tijmen van der Helm | Aurus 01 | 556 | Clutch |
| 47 DNF | LMP2 | 69 | (Russia) G-Drive Racing with APR | (Australia) James Allen (United States) John Falb (Italy) Luca Ghiotto (Netherlands) Tijmen van der Helm | Gibson GK428 4.2 L V8 | 556 | Clutch |
| 48 DNF | GTD | 42 | (United States) NTE Sport | (United States) Jaden Conwright (Chile) Benjamín Hites (Finland) Markus Palttala (United States) Don Yount | Lamborghini Huracán GT3 Evo | 524 | Puncture damage |
| 48 DNF | GTD | 42 | (United States) NTE Sport | (United States) Jaden Conwright (Chile) Benjamín Hites (Finland) Markus Palttala (United States) Don Yount | Lamborghini 5.2 L V10 | 524 | Puncture damage |
| 49 DNF | GTD; Pro | 97 | (United States) WeatherTech Racing | (Germany) Maro Engel (France) Jules Gounon (Spain) Daniel Juncadella (United States) Cooper MacNeil | Mercedes-AMG GT3 Evo | 487 | Engine |
| 49 DNF | GTD; Pro | 97 | (United States) WeatherTech Racing | (Germany) Maro Engel (France) Jules Gounon (Spain) Daniel Juncadella (United States) Cooper MacNeil | Mercedes-AMG M159 6.2 L V8 | 487 | Engine |
| 50 DNF | LMP3 | 7 | (United States) Forty7 Motorsports | (France) Antoine Doquin (United States) Trenton Estep (United States) Mark Kvamme (United States) Austin McCusker | Duqueine M30 - D08 | 425 | Fire |
| 50 DNF | LMP3 | 7 | (United States) Forty7 Motorsports | (France) Antoine Doquin (United States) Trenton Estep (United States) Mark Kvamme (United States) Austin McCusker | Nissan VK56DE 5.6 L V8 | 425 | Fire |
| 51 DNF | GTD; Pro | 63 | (United States) TR3 Racing | (Italy) Mirko Bortolotti (Italy) Andrea Caldarelli (Switzerland) Rolf Ineichen (Italy) Marco Mapelli | Lamborghini Huracán GT3 Evo | 400 | Accident damage |
| 51 DNF | GTD; Pro | 63 | (United States) TR3 Racing | (Italy) Mirko Bortolotti (Italy) Andrea Caldarelli (Switzerland) Rolf Ineichen (Italy) Marco Mapelli | Lamborghini 5.2 L V10 | 400 | Accident damage |
| 52 DNF | LMP3 | 6 | (Belgium) Mühlner Motorsports America | (Dominican Republic) Efrin Castro (Germany) Mortiz Kranz (United States) Joel Miller (United States) Ayrton Ori | Duqueine M30 - D08 | 363 | Accident damage |
| 52 DNF | LMP3 | 6 | (Belgium) Mühlner Motorsports America | (Dominican Republic) Efrin Castro (Germany) Mortiz Kranz (United States) Joel Miller (United States) Ayrton Ori | Nissan VK56DE 5.6 L V8 | 363 | Accident damage |
| 53 DNF | GTD | 39 | (United States) CarBahn with Peregine Racing | (United States) Corey Lewis (United States) Robert Megennis (United Kingdom) Sandy Mitchell (United States) Jeff Westphal | Lamborghini Huracán GT3 Evo | 349 | Contact damage |
| 53 DNF | GTD | 39 | (United States) CarBahn with Peregine Racing | (United States) Corey Lewis (United States) Robert Megennis (United Kingdom) Sandy Mitchell (United States) Jeff Westphal | Lamborghini 5.2 L V10 | 349 | Contact damage |
| 54 DNF | LMP2 | 20 | (Denmark) High Class Racing | (Denmark) Dennis Andersen (Denmark) Anders Fjordbach (Switzerland) Nico Müller (Switzerland) Fabio Scherer | Oreca 07 | 345 | Accident damage |
| 54 DNF | LMP2 | 20 | (Denmark) High Class Racing | (Denmark) Dennis Andersen (Denmark) Anders Fjordbach (Switzerland) Nico Müller (Switzerland) Fabio Scherer | Gibson GK428 4.2 L V8 | 345 | Accident damage |
| 55 DNF | LMP2 | 18 | (United States) Era Motorsport | (France) Paul-Loup Chatin (United Kingdom) Ryan Dalziel (United States) Dwight Merriman (United Kingdom) Kyle Tilley | Oreca 07 | 718^{1} | Gearbox |
| 55 DNF | LMP2 | 18 | (United States) Era Motorsport | (France) Paul-Loup Chatin (United Kingdom) Ryan Dalziel (United States) Dwight Merriman (United Kingdom) Kyle Tilley | Gibson GK428 4.2 L V8 | 718^{1} | Gearbox |
| 56 DNF | GTD | 96 | (United States) Turner Motorsport | (United States) Bill Auberlen (United States) Michael Dinan (United States) Robby Foley (Germany) Jens Klingmann | BMW M4 GT3 | 280 | Diffuser damage |
| 56 DNF | GTD | 96 | (United States) Turner Motorsport | (United States) Bill Auberlen (United States) Michael Dinan (United States) Robby Foley (Germany) Jens Klingmann | BMW S58B30T0 3.0 L Twin Turbo I6 | 280 | Diffuser damage |
| 57 DNF | GTD | 59 | (United States) Crucial Motorsports | (United States) Lance Bergstein (United States) Patrick Gallagher (United States) Paul Holton (United States) Jon Miller | McLaren 720S GT3 | 263 | Oil leak |
| 57 DNF | GTD | 59 | (United States) Crucial Motorsports | (United States) Lance Bergstein (United States) Patrick Gallagher (United States) Paul Holton (United States) Jon Miller | McLaren M840T 4.0 L Turbo V8 | 263 | Oil leak |
| 58 DNF | GTD | 28 | (United States) Alegra Motorsports | (Germany) Maximilian Götz (Sweden) Linus Lundqvist (Canada) Daniel Morad (United States) Michael de Quesada | Mercedes-AMG GT3 Evo | 181 | Alternator |
| 58 DNF | GTD | 28 | (United States) Alegra Motorsports | (Germany) Maximilian Götz (Sweden) Linus Lundqvist (Canada) Daniel Morad (United States) Michael de Quesada | Mercedes-AMG M159 6.2 L V8 | 181 | Alternator |
| 59 DNF | GTD; Pro | 23 | (United States) Heart of Racing Team | (United Kingdom) Ross Gunn (Belgium) Maxime Martin (Spain) Alex Riberas | Aston Martin Vantage AMR GT3 | 103 | Accident |
| 59 DNF | GTD; Pro | 23 | (United States) Heart of Racing Team | (United Kingdom) Ross Gunn (Belgium) Maxime Martin (Spain) Alex Riberas | Aston Martin 4.0 L Turbo V8 | 103 | Accident |
| 60 DNF | GTD | 75 | (Australia) SunEnergy1 | (Australia) Kenny Habul (Italy) Raffaele Marciello (Germany) Fabian Schiller (Germany) Luca Stolz | Mercedes-AMG GT3 Evo | 101 | Accident |
| 60 DNF | GTD | 75 | (Australia) SunEnergy1 | (Australia) Kenny Habul (Italy) Raffaele Marciello (Germany) Fabian Schiller (Germany) Luca Stolz | Mercedes-AMG M159 6.2 L V8 | 101 | Accident |
| 61 DNF | GTD | 34 | (United States) GMG Racing | (Austria) Klaus Bachler (Netherlands) Jeroen Bleekemolen (United States) James Sofronas (United States) Kyle Washington | Porsche 911 GT3 R | 88 | Accident |
| 61 DNF | GTD | 34 | (United States) GMG Racing | (Austria) Klaus Bachler (Netherlands) Jeroen Bleekemolen (United States) James Sofronas (United States) Kyle Washington | Porsche MA1.76/MDG.G 4.0 L Flat-6 engine | 88 | Accident |
BOX SCORE

- ^{1} The #18 Era Motorsports entry was demoted to last in the LMP2 class as Kyle Tilley failed to meet minimum drive time for the race.

== Standings after the race ==
DPi Drivers' Championship standings
| Pos. | Driver | Points |
|---|---|---|
| 1 | (United Kingdom) Tom Blomqvist (United Kingdom) Oliver Jarvis (Brazil) Hélio Castroneves (France) Simon Pagenaud | 378 |
| 2 | (Portugal) Filipe Albuquerque (United States) Ricky Taylor (United Kingdom) Will Stevens (United States) Alexander Rossi | 355 |
| 3 | (France) Tristan Vautier (United Kingdom) Richard Westbrook (France) Loïc Duval (United States) Ben Keating | 332 |
| 4 | (Brazil) Pipo Derani (United States) Tristan Nunez (United Kingdom) Mike Conway | 304 |
| 5 | (Japan) Kamui Kobayashi (Germany) Mike Rockenfeller (United States) Jimmie Johnson (Argentina) José María López | 290 |

LMP2 Drivers' Championship standings
| Pos. | Driver | Points |
|---|---|---|
| 1 | (Canada) Devlin DeFrancesco (United States) Colton Herta (United States) Eric Lux (Mexico) Patricio O'Ward | 0‡ |
| 2 | (United States) Dylan Murry (Netherlands) Frits van Eerd (Netherlands) Giedo van der Garde (Netherlands) Rinus VeeKay | 0‡ |
| 3 | (Canada) John Farano (Switzerland) Louis Delétraz (Portugal) Rui Andrade (Austria) Ferdinand Habsburg-Lothringen | 0‡ |
| 4 | (United States) Ben Keating (United States) Scott Huffaker (Denmark) Mikkel Jensen (France) Nicolas Lapierre | 0‡ |
| 5 | (France) François Heriau (United Arab Emirates) Ed Jones (Denmark) Oliver Rasmussen (Germany) René Rast | 0‡ |

LMP3 Drivers' Championship standings
| Pos. | Driver | Points |
|---|---|---|
| 1 | (United States) Gar Robinson (Brazil) Felipe Fraga (United States) Michael Cooper (Netherlands) Kay van Berlo | 0‡ |
| 2 | (Portugal) João Barbosa (Denmark) Malthe Jakobsen (United States) Lance Willsey (Guernsey) Sebastian Priaulx | 0‡ |
| 3 | (United States) Jon Bennett (United States) Colin Braun (United States) George Kurtz (Sweden) Niclas Jönsson | 0‡ |
| 4 | (United States) Jarett Andretti (Colombia) Gabby Chaves (Sweden) Rasmus Lindh (Australia) Josh Burdon | 0‡ |
| 5 | (United Kingdom) Matthew Bell (Canada) Orey Fidani (Germany) Lars Kern (Canada) Kuno Wittmer | 0‡ |

GTD Pro Drivers' Championship standings
| Pos. | Driver | Points |
|---|---|---|
| 1 | (Australia) Matt Campbell (France) Mathieu Jaminet (Brazil) Felipe Nasr | 382 |
| 2 | (Italy) Davide Rigon (Brazil) Daniel Serra (United Kingdom) James Calado (Italy) Alessandro Pier Guidi | 340 |
| 3 | (Switzerland) Alexandre Imperatori (Norway) Dennis Olsen (France) Patrick Pilet (Belgium) Laurens Vanthoor | 321 |
| 4 | (United Kingdom) Ben Barnicoat (United Kingdom) Jack Hawksworth (United States) Kyle Kirkwood | 306 |
| 5 | (Germany) Patrick Assenheimer (United States) Austin Cindric (Germany) Dirk Müller | 290 |

GTD Drivers' Championship standings
| Pos. | Driver | Points |
|---|---|---|
| 1 | (United States) Ryan Hardwick (Belgium) Jan Heylen (Canada) Zacharie Robichon (Austria) Richard Lietz | 370 |
| 2 | (United States) Andy Lally (United States) John Potter (United States) Spencer Pumpelly (United Kingdom) Jonathan Adam | 342 |
| 3 | (United Kingdom) Stevan McAleer (United States) Mike Skeen (Australia) Scott Andrews (Australia) James Davison | 326 |
| 4 | (Argentina) Luís Pérez Companc (United Kingdom) Simon Mann (Finland) Toni Vilander (Denmark) Nicklas Nielsen | 294 |
| 5 | (United Kingdom) Phillip Ellis (United States) Russell Ward (Austria) Lucas Auer (Canada) Mikaël Grenier | 285 |

- Note: Only the top five positions are included for all sets of standings.
- ‡: Points only awarded towards Michelin Endurance Cup championship.

DPi Teams' Championship standings
| Pos. | Team | Points |
|---|---|---|
| 1 | (United States) #60 Meyer Shank Racing w/ Curb-Agajanian | 378 |
| 2 | (United States) #10 WTR - Konica Minolta Acura | 355 |
| 3 | (United States) #5 JDC-Miller MotorSports | 332 |
| 4 | (United States) #31 Whelen Engineering Racing | 304 |
| 5 | (United States) #48 Ally Cadillac Racing | 290 |

LMP2 Teams' Championship standings
| Pos. | Team | Points |
|---|---|---|
| 1 | (United States) #81 DragonSpeed USA | 0‡ |
| 2 | (Netherlands) #29 Racing Team Nederland | 0‡ |
| 3 | (United States) #8 Tower Motorsport | 0‡ |
| 4 | (United States) #52 PR1/Mathiasen Motorsports | 0‡ |
| 5 | (Russia) #68 G-Drive Racing by APR | 0‡ |

LMP3 Teams' Championship standings
| Pos. | Team | Points |
|---|---|---|
| 1 | (United States) #74 Riley Motorsports | 0‡ |
| 2 | (United States) #33 Sean Creech Motorsport | 0‡ |
| 3 | (United States) #54 CORE Autosport | 0‡ |
| 4 | (United States) #36 Andretti Autosport | 0‡ |
| 5 | (Canada) #13 AWA | 0‡ |

GTD Pro Teams' Championship standings
| Pos. | Team | Points |
|---|---|---|
| 1 | (Canada) #9 Pfaff Motorsports | 382 |
| 2 | (United States) #62 Risi Competizione | 340 |
| 3 | (Hong Kong) #2 KCMG | 321 |
| 4 | (United States) #14 Vasser Sullivan Racing | 306 |
| 5 | (Germany) #15 Proton USA | 290 |

GTD Teams' Championship standings
| Pos. | Team | Points |
|---|---|---|
| 1 | (United States) #16 Wright Motorsports | 370 |
| 2 | (United States) #44 Magnus Racing | 342 |
| 3 | (United States) #32 Gilbert Korthoff Motorsports | 326 |
| 4 | (Italy) #21 AF Corse | 294 |
| 5 | (United States) #57 Winward Racing | 285 |

- Note: Only the top five positions are included for all sets of standings.
- ‡: Points only awarded towards Michelin Endurance Cup championship.

DPi Manufacturers' Championship standings
| Pos. | Manufacturer | Points |
|---|---|---|
| 1 | (Japan) Acura | 385 |
| 2 | (United States) Cadillac | 352 |

GTD Pro Manufacturers' Championship standings
| Pos. | Manufacturer | Points |
|---|---|---|
| 1 | (Germany) Porsche | 382 |
| 2 | (Italy) Lamborghini | 344 |
| 3 | (Japan) Lexus | 326 |
| 4 | (Germany) Mercedes-AMG | 310 |
| 5 | (United States) Chevrolet | 285 |

GTD Manufacturers' Championship standings
| Pos. | Manufacturer | Points |
|---|---|---|
| 1 | (Germany) Porsche | 375 |
| 2 | (United Kingdom) Aston Martin | 346 |
| 3 | (Germany) Mercedes-AMG | 335 |
| 4 | (Italy) Ferrari | 304 |
| 5 | (United Kingdom) McLaren | 292 |

- Note: Only the top five positions are included for all sets of standings.

IMSA SportsCar Championship
| Previous race: none | 2022 season | Next race: 12 Hours of Sebring |
