= Josh Green (racing driver) =

American racing driver (born 2002)

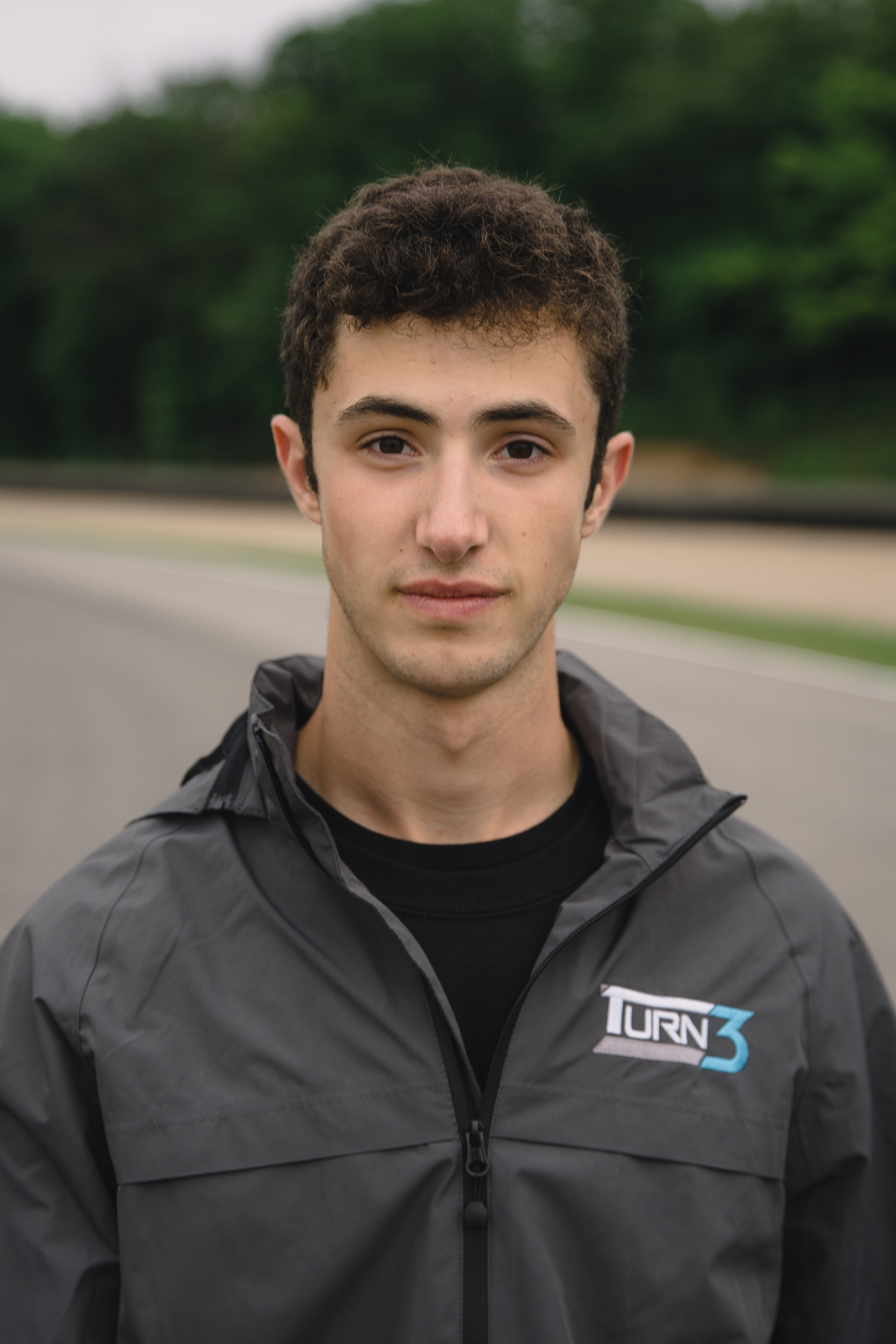
- Green in 2022
- Nationality: (United States) American
- Born: November 15, 2002 (age 23) Mount Kisco, New York, United States

GT4 America Series career
- Debut season: 2024
- Current team: Random Vandals Racing
- Categorisation: FIA Silver
- Car number: 94
- Starts: 9
- Wins: 3
- Podiums: 3
- Poles: 0
- Fastest laps: 0
- Best finish: NC in 2024 (Pro-Am)

Previous series
- 2024 2024 2023 2022 2019–21 2019 2019: IMSA SportsCar Challenge; Michelin Pilot Challenge; Indy NXT; Indy Pro 2000 Championship; U.S. F2000 National Championship; F1600 Championship Series; Formula Ford Festival

Josh Green (born November 15, 2002) is an American racing driver. He currently competes in the 2026 GT4 America Series in the Pro-Am category, partnering Sam Craven at Random Vandals Racing. He previously competed in the 2023 INDY NXT season driving for HMD Motorsports with Dale Coyne Racing.

== Racing career ==
=== Karting ===
Green first competed in racing driving indoor karts in 2015. He quickly moved into outdoor karting at Oakland Valley Raceway Park in Cuddebackville, NY, running in club and regional events in 2016. Over the next two years, Green competed in regional and national events, and won the IAME X30 Junior championship in the 2018 WKA Manufacturers Cup. He was also invited to race in the IAME International Final at Le Mans, France.

=== Junior formulae ===
In 2019, Green added a formula car racing program to his karting schedule running in the FRP F1600 Championship Series. He won eight races and finished on the podium in eighteen of the 21 races, finishing second overall in the championship. This season-long performance caught the eye of Team USA Scholarship’s Jeremy Shaw who invited Josh to the program’s shootout at Road America in September 2019. Green was one of the two drivers selected to join Team USA at the BRSCC Formula Ford Festival and Walter Hayes Trophy events in England. He finished in the top-ten at the Festival and was the top qualifier in the wet for the WHT at Silverstone.

=== USF2000 Championship ===
Green made his Road to Indy debut at Portland International Raceway in September 2019, competing in USF2000 for Jay Howard Driver Development. He took a best finish of tenth in the second race of the weekend.

In 2020, Green contested the full USF2000 season with Cape Motorsports. He finished sixth in the championship with three podiums, two of which came in the opening weekend of the season.

Green remained in the series for 2021, this time with Turn 3 Motorsport. After winning the final race of the season, he finished fifth in the standings, with one additional podium.

=== Indy Pro 2000 ===
On November 18, 2021, it was announced that Green would move up to Indy Pro 2000 with Turn 3 Motorsport to compete in the 2022 season. He won on his debut in the series, having started from pole position and led the most laps. With three additional podiums, he finished the season in sixth place overall.

=== Indy NXT ===
On September 15, 2022, Green announced that he would move up another rung in the Road to Indy ladder to Indy NXT in 2023 and drive for HMD Motorsports with Dale Coyne Racing. He finished in the top ten in his first three races, with a high of sixth at the Indianapolis Motor Speedway. However, he left the series prior to round 7 at Mid-Ohio.

=== Sportscars ===
For 2024, Green switched to driving in sportscars. He entered round two of the Michelin Pilot Challenge, partnering Marc Miller at Thaze Competition. The pair finished 16th overall in the race. He then entered rounds three and four of the IMSA VP Racing SportsCar Challenge, again for Thaze Competition. He finished on the GSX class podium in all four races, taking a class win in race two at Mosport.

Late in 2024, Green made his GT4 America Series debut for Random Vandals Racing, partnering Sam Craven for the final two rounds. He remained with the team and with Craven for 2025. The pair took three class wins in the first five races, finishing on the overall podium each time.

== Racing record ==
=== Career summary ===
Season	Series	Team	Races	Wins	Poles	F/Laps	Podiums	Points	Position
2019	Formula Ford Festival	Cliff Dempsey Racing/Team USA Scholarship	1	0	0	0	0	N/A	10th
2019	U.S. F2000 National Championship	Jay Howard Driver Development	2	0	0	0	0	21	21st
2019	F1600 Championship Series	Team Pelfrey	21	8	5	7	18	856	**2nd**
2020	U.S. F2000 National Championship	Cape Motorsports	17	0	0	0	3	245	6th
2021	U.S. F2000 National Championship	Turn 3 Motorsport	18	1	0	0	2	280	5th
2022	Indy Pro 2000 Championship	Turn 3 Motorsport	18	1	2	0	4	298	6th
2023	Indy NXT	HMD Motorsports with Dale Coyne Racing	6	0	0	0	0	119	20th
2024	Michelin Pilot Challenge - GS	Thaze Competition	1	0	0	0	0	150	63rd
2024	IMSA VP Racing SportsCar Challenge - GS	Thaze Competition	4	1	0	0	4	1290	10th
2024	GT4 America Series - Pro-Am	Random Vandals Racing	4	0	0	0	0	NC†	NC†
2025	GT4 America Series - Pro-Am	Random Vandals Racing	5	3	0	0	3	91*	2nd*
2026	GT4 America Series - Pro-Am	Random Vandals Racing							
2026	Michelin Pilot Challenge - GS	Random Vandals Racing							

* Season still in progress.

† As Green was a guest driver, he was ineligible to score points.

=== American open-wheel racing results ===
==== U.S. F2000 National Championship ====
(key) (Races in bold indicate pole position) (Races in italics indicate fastest lap) (Races with * indicate most race laps led)

Year	Team	1	2	3	4	5	6	7	8	9	10	11	12	13	14	15	16	17	18	Rank	Points
2019	Jay Howard Driver Development	STP; 1	STP; 2	IMS; 1	IMS; 2	LOR	ROA; 1	ROA; 2	TOR; 1	TOR; 2	MOH; 1	MOH; 2	POR; 1; 11	POR; 2; 10	LAG; 1	LAG; 1				21st	21
2020	Cape Motorsports	ROA; 1; 2	ROA; 2; 3	MOH; 1; 17	MOH; 2; 8	MOH; 3; 7	LOR; 6	IMS; 1; 4	IMS; 2; 11	IMS; 3; 6	MOH; 4; 5	MOH; 5; 19	MOH; 6; 9	NJM; 1; 18	NJM; 2; 9	NJM; 3; 2	STP; 1; 4	STP; 2; 11		6th	245
2021	Turn 3 Motorsport	ALA; 1; 9	ALA; 2; 7	STP; 1; 18	STP; 2; 5	IMS; 1; 5	IMS; 2; 6	IMS; 3; 8	LOR; 7	ROA; 1; 10	ROA; 2; 4	MOH; 1; 9	MOH; 2; 10	MOH; 3; 21	NJMP; 1; 4	NJMP; 2; 4	NJMP; 3; 2	MOH; 4; 4	MOH; 5; 1*	5th	279

==== Indy Pro 2000 Championship ====
(key) (Races in bold indicate pole position) (Races in italics indicate fastest lap) (Races with * indicate most race laps led)

Year	Team	1	2	3	4	5	6	7	8	9	10	11	12	13	14	15	16	17	18	Rank	Points
2022	Turn 3 Motorsport	**STP**; **1**; 1*	STP; 2; 11	ALA; 1; 6	ALA; 2; 6	IMS; 1; 11	IMS; 2; 11	IMS; 3; 7	IRP; 3	ROA; 1; 2	**ROA**; **2**; 6	MOH; 1; 5	MOH; 2; 9	TOR; 1; 3	TOR; 2; 13	GMP; 5	POR; 1; 9	POR; 2; 13	POR; 3; 8	6th	298

==== Indy NXT ====
(key) (Races in bold indicate pole position) (Races in italics indicate fastest lap) (Races with ^{L} indicate a race lap led) (Races with * indicate most race laps led)

Year	Team	1	2	3	4	5	6	7	8	9	10	11	12	13	14	Rank	Points
2023	HMD Motorsports with Dale Coyne Racing	STP; 7	ALA; 9	IMS; 6	DET; 15	DET; 18	RDA; 14	MOH	IOW	NSH	IMS	GMP	POR	LAG	LAG	20th	119
