= 2019 F1600 Championship Series =

8th season of the F1600 Championship Series

2019 F1600 season

Season
- Races: 21
- Start date: April 18
- End date: September 15

Awards
- Drivers' champion: (United States) Jonathan Kotyk
- Manufacturers' Cup: (France) Mygale

The 2019 F1600 Championship Series season was the eighth season of the F1600 Championship Series.

Jonathan Kotyk successfully defended his 2018 SCCA National Runoffs Formula F title this year with K-Hill Motorsports, which also signed him to compete in the F1600 Championship Series.

His main rival throughout the season was fellow Team USA scholar and Team Pelfrey driver Josh Green. The two dominated the early part of the championship, going unbeaten in the first 12 races. Their winning streak was briefly interrupted at Pittsburgh, where F2000 driver Simon Sikes stepped down a category to claim victory. Once the Kotyk–Green dominance resumed, it was Kotyk who held the upper hand, winning the remaining six races.

Josh Green, the 2019 F1600 Series runner-up, was selected as a Team USA Scholarship recipient for the season. As part of the program, he will benefit from a range of valuable support services.

Scott Rubenzer claimed the title of F1600 Master Champion, while Bob Reid and Mike Scanlan completed the 2019 final podium in second and third place, respectively.

Alvise Anti received special recognition for his contributions to FRP. He kept his son Charles (#26) competitive within a highly challenging field prepared by major teams.

== Drivers and teams ==
Pro Division
Team/Sponsor	No.	Drivers	Rounds	Chassis	Engine
(United States) Lee Racing	05	(United States) John Robinson II (M)	10–12	Swift	Ford
(United States) Lee Racing	177	(United States) Jonathan Lee	10–12	Swift	Ford
(Canada) Rice Race Prep	07	(United States) Burton August	All	Mygale	Honda
(Canada) Rice Race Prep	13	(Canada) Misha Goikhberg	1–6	Mygale	Honda
(Canada) Rice Race Prep	13	(United States) Alex Scaler	7–9; 19–21	Mygale	Honda
(Canada) Rice Race Prep	13	(United States) Rick Payne (M)	10–12	Mygale	Honda
(Canada) Rice Race Prep	13	(United States) Simon Sikes	13–15	Mygale	Honda
(Canada) Rice Race Prep	18	(United States) Jackson Lee	16–18	Mygale	Honda
(United States) K-Hill Motorsports	7	(United States) Bryce Aron	4–21	Mygale	Honda
(United States) K-Hill Motorsports	81	(United States) Bryce Aron	1–3	Mygale	Honda
(United States) K-Hill Motorsports	8	(United States) Jonathan Kotyk	1–6; 10–21	Mygale	Honda
(United States) K-Hill Motorsports	18	(United States) Jonathan Kotyk	7–9	Mygale	Honda
Polestar	19	(United States) Tim Dunn (M)	1–3	PMR-17	Honda
Polestar	40	(United States) Keith Grant (M)	10–12	PMF-17	Ford
(United States) Team Pelfrey	27	(United States) Ayrton Ori	1–12	Mygale	Honda
(United States) Team Pelfrey	80	(United States) Josh Green	All	Mygale	Honda
(United States) Team Pelfrey	81	(United States) Dexter Czuba	4–15	Mygale	Honda
(United States) Raceworks	42	(United States) Ryan Bjerke	1–3; 7–12	Spectrum	Honda
(United States) Raceworks	70	(United States) Sam Lockwood (M)	7–9	Spectrum	Honda
(Canada) Britain West Motorsports	04	(Canada) Matt Gidman	1–3	Van Diemen	Honda
(Canada) Britain West Motorsports	63	(Canada) Gord Ross (M)	1–3	Mygale	Honda
(Canada) Britain West Motorsports	65	(Canada) Zachary Vanier	1–3	Mygale	Honda
Heritage Security & Service	03	(United States) Greg Peluso (M)	10–12	Van Diemen	Honda
(United States) Drivers Services	2	(United States) Mike Scanlan (M)	All	Spectrum	Honda
Alpine Litho-Graphics	4	(United States) Cliff Johnson (M)	1–3; 7–9	Piper	Honda
	4	(United States) Charles Finelli (M)	18–21		
(United States) Auriana Racing	5	(United States) Joe Colasacco (M)	16–18	Van Diemen	Honda
ATC Technologies Inc.	11	(United States) Christopher Kierce	7–9	Van Diemen	Honda
(United States) Steve Roux Racing	11	(United States) Steve Roux (M)	18–21	Wyvern	Honda
Weiss	12	(United States) Bob Reid (M)	All	Citation	Honda
Shady Hill Clayworks	21	(United States) David Petzko (M)	1–9; 10–21	Spectrum	Honda
Steelfiber	24	(United States) Christopher Horan	7–9; 13–15	Van Diemen	Honda
(United States) AntiSpeed	26	(United States) Charles Anti	1–3; 7–21	Van Diemen	Honda
Practical Precision Engineering	30	(United States) Will Velkoff	18–21	Van Diemen	Honda
Morgan's Collision Center	31	(United States) Scott Rubenzer (M)	1–18	Spectrum	Honda
Aero Services Winchester	36	(United States) Steve Oseth (M)	18–21	Citation	Honda
Home Tech Bldg. Consultants	41	(United States) Robert Albani (M)	13–15	Mygale	Honda
Home Tech Bldg. Consultants	81	(United States) Robert Albani (M)	18–21	Mygale	Honda
Steel Services	72	(United States) Tom Schwietz (M)	7–9; 18–21	Citation	Honda
ThursdayPools	77	(United States) Zachary Rivard	7–9	Van Diemen	
Parametric Solutions	93	(United States) Christian Lall Dass	1–9	Piper	Honda

(M): indicates Masters Class driver (for drivers 39 years and older)

== Schedule ==
Rd.	Date	Track	Location
1	April 18–20	Michelin Raceway Road Atlanta	(Georgia (U.S. state)) Braselton, Georgia
2	April 18–20	Michelin Raceway Road Atlanta	(Georgia (U.S. state)) Braselton, Georgia
3	April 18–20	Michelin Raceway Road Atlanta	(Georgia (U.S. state)) Braselton, Georgia
4	May 10–12	Watkins Glen International	(New York (state)) Dix, New York
5	May 10–12	Watkins Glen International	(New York (state)) Dix, New York
6	May 10–12	Watkins Glen International	(New York (state)) Dix, New York
7	June 28–30	Mid-Ohio Sports Car Course	Lexington, Ohio
8	June 28–30	Mid-Ohio Sports Car Course	Lexington, Ohio
9	June 28–30	Mid-Ohio Sports Car Course	Lexington, Ohio
10	July 26–28	Virginia International Raceway	Alton, Virginia
11	July 26–28	Virginia International Raceway	Alton, Virginia
12	July 26–28	Virginia International Raceway	Alton, Virginia
13	August 2–4	Pittsburgh International Race Complex	Wampum, Pennsylvania
14	August 2–4	Pittsburgh International Race Complex	Wampum, Pennsylvania
15	August 2–4	Pittsburgh International Race Complex	Wampum, Pennsylvania
16	August 23–25	Summit Point Motorsports Park	Summit Point, West Virginia
17	August 23–25	Summit Point Motorsports Park	Summit Point, West Virginia
18	August 23–25	Summit Point Motorsports Park	Summit Point, West Virginia
19	September 13–15	New Jersey Motorsports Park	Millville, New Jersey
20	September 13–15	New Jersey Motorsports Park	Millville, New Jersey
21	September 13–15	New Jersey Motorsports Park	Millville, New Jersey

== Results & performance summaries ==
Round	Circuit	Location	Date	Pole position	Fastest lap	Winning driver
1	Michelin Raceway Road Atlanta	(Georgia (U.S. state)) Braselton, Georgia	April 19	(Canada) Zachary Vanier	(Canada) Misha Goikhberg	(United States) Josh Green
2	Michelin Raceway Road Atlanta	(Georgia (U.S. state)) Braselton, Georgia	April 20		(Canada) Misha Goikhberg	(United States) Jonathan Kotyk
3	Michelin Raceway Road Atlanta	(Georgia (U.S. state)) Braselton, Georgia	April 20		(Canada) Zachary Vanier	(United States) Jonathan Kotyk
4	Watkins Glen International	(New York (state)) Dix, New York	May 11	(United States) Jonathan Kotyk	(Canada) Misha Goikhberg	(United States) Jonathan Kotyk
5	Watkins Glen International	(New York (state)) Dix, New York	May 12		(United States) Josh Green	(United States) Jonathan Kotyk
6	Watkins Glen International	(New York (state)) Dix, New York	May 12		(United States) Josh Green	(United States) Josh Green
7	Mid-Ohio Sports Car Course	Lexington, Ohio	June 29	(United States) Alex Scaler	(United States) Jonathan Kotyk	(United States) Jonathan Kotyk
8	Mid-Ohio Sports Car Course	Lexington, Ohio	June 30		(United States) Alex Scaler	(United States) Jonathan Kotyk
9	Mid-Ohio Sports Car Course	Lexington, Ohio	June 30		(United States) Josh Green	(United States) Josh Green
10	Virginia International Raceway	Alton, Virginia	July 27	(United States) Josh Green	(United States) Josh Green	(United States) Josh Green
11	Virginia International Raceway	Alton, Virginia	July 28		(United States) Josh Green	(United States) Josh Green
12	Virginia International Raceway	Alton, Virginia	July 28		(United States) Josh Green	(United States) Josh Green
13	Pittsburgh International Race Complex	Wampum, Pennsylvania	August 3	(United States) Josh Green	(United States) Dexter Czuba	(United States) Simon Sikes
14	Pittsburgh International Race Complex	Wampum, Pennsylvania	August 4		(United States) Simon Sikes	(United States) Jonathan Kotyk
15	Pittsburgh International Race Complex	Wampum, Pennsylvania	August 4		(United States) Dexter Czuba	(United States) Simon Sikes
16	Summit Point Motorsports Park	Summit Point, West Virginia	October 24	(United States) Josh Green	(United States) Josh Green	(United States) Josh Green
17	Summit Point Motorsports Park	Summit Point, West Virginia	October 24		(United States) Jackson Lee	(United States) Jonathan Kotyk
18	Summit Point Motorsports Park	Summit Point, West Virginia	August 25		(United States) Bryce Aron	(United States) Jonathan Kotyk
19	New Jersey Motorsports Park	Millville, New Jersey	September 15	(United States) Jonathan Kotyk	(United States) Josh Green	(United States) Jonathan Kotyk
20	New Jersey Motorsports Park	Millville, New Jersey	September 15		(United States) Jonathan Kotyk	(United States) Jonathan Kotyk
21	New Jersey Motorsports Park	Millville, New Jersey	September 15		(United States) Jonathan Kotyk	(United States) Josh Green
References: F1600 Archive Results

== Driver Standings ==
Pos	Driver	RA			WGL			MO			VIR			PITT			SP			NJMP			Pts
1	(United States) Jonathan Kotyk	2	1	1	**1**	1	2	1	1	5	2	2	2	3	1	5	2	1	1	**1**	1	2	896
2	(United States) Josh Green	1	2	5	3	2	1	2	6	1	**1**	1	1	**2**	2	12	**1**	2	3	2	3	1	856
3	(United States) Bryce Aron	5	4	3	5	12	DNS	7	10	3	6	4	3	6	4	4	3	3	4	3	2	3	639
4	(United States) Burton August	6	8	13	8	11	9	11	13	10	14	DNF	7	8	9	6	5	4	DNS	5	5	5	464
5	(United States) Dexter Czuba				4	3	3	3	4	2	5	3	4	4	3	2							442
6	(United States) Charles Anti	7	DNF	DNS				13	14	13	4	5	9	7	7	7	6	5	5	6	6	6	416
7	(United States) Scott Rubenzer (M)	16	DNF	10	11	7	7	9	9	9	7	14	10	9	8	8	8	8	6				386
8	(United States) Bob Reid (M)	15	14	14	12	8	8	18	18	17	9	11	12	12	11	9	9	9	8	7	7	9	378
9	(United States) Mike Scanlan (M)	18	13	12	10	10	10	14	17	15	12	10	11	10	10	11	11	7	7	11	13	12	361
10	(United States) Christian Lall Dass	9	5	4	2	5	5	5	7	6													277
11	(United States) Ayrton Ori	DSQ	16	6	6	6	4	8	3	4	13	15	14										266
12	(United States) David Petzko (M)	13	11	15	9	9	11	19	19	18				13	13	10	10	11	9	DNF	DNS	DNS	255
13	(United States) Ryan Bjerke	8	6	7				10	11	8	3	6	5										241
14	(Canada) Misha Goikhberg	3	3	2	7	4	6																209
15	(United States) Alex Scaler							**6**	2	19										4	4	4	185
16	(United States) Christopher Horan (M)							4	5	11				5	6	3							181
17	(United States) Simon Sikes													1	5	1							133
18	(United States) Robert Albani (M)													12	12	DNS				10	8	10	103
19	(United States) Jackson Lee																4	10	2				99
20	(United States) Cliff Johnson (M)	12	9	DNS				12	12	20													78
21	(United States) Keith Grant (M)										8	7	8										77
22	(Canada) Zachary Vanier	**4**	12	8																			75
23	(Canada) Gord Ross (M)	10	7	9																			69
24	(United States) Charles Finelli (M)																			8	11	8	67
25	(United States) Jonathan Lee										15	8	6										65
26	(United States) Tom Schwietz (M)							15	15	14										9	DNF	DNS	59
27	(United States) Zachary Rivard							20	8	7													58
28	(United States) Joe Colasacco (M)																7	6	DNS				56
29	(United States) Steve Oseth (M)																			DNS	9	7	50
30	(United States) Rick Payne (M)										16	9	13										48
31	(Canada) Matt Gidman	11	15	11																			47
32	(United States) Tim Dunn (M)	14	10	16																			42
33	(United States) Will Velkoff																			DNF	10	11	41
34	(United States) Christopher Kierce							16	16	12													37
35	(United States) Greg Peluso (M)										11	12	DNS										36
36	(United States) John Robinson II (M)										10	13	DNS										35
37	(United States) Steve Roux (M)																			12	12	DNS	34
Drivers ineligible for points
	(United States) Sam Lockwood (M)							17	20	16													
Pos	Driver	RA			WGL			MO			VIR			PITT			SP			NJMP			Pts
References: F1600 Championship Series 2019 & Season Points Standings

Color	Result
Gold	Winner
Silver	2nd-place finish
Bronze	3rd-place finish
Green	Top 5 finish
Light Blue	Top 10 finish
Dark Blue	Other flagged position
Purple	Did not finish (DNF)
Brown	Withdrew (Wth)
Black	Disqualified (DSQ)
White	Did Not Start (DNS)
White	Race abandoned (C)
Blank	Did not participate

**In-line notation**
**Bold**	Pole position (3 points)
Italics	Fastest lap of the race (2 points)

== See also ==
- F1600 Championship Series
- 2019 F2000 Championship Series
