= Ayrton Ori =

American racing driver (born 2004)

- Born: June 23, 2004 (age 22); Orlando, Florida, U.S.

ARCA Menards Series career
- 1 race run over 1 year
- Best finish: 78th (2020)
- First race: 2020 General Tire 100 (Daytona RC)
Wins	Top tens	Poles
0	0	0
- Statistics up to date as of January 27, 2025.

Ayrton Ori (born June 23, 2004) is an American professional auto racing driver who has previously competed in the ARCA Menards Series and the GB3 Championship.

Ori has also competed in series such as the Formula 4 United States Championship, the USF2000 Championship, and the Lucas Oil Formula Car Race Series, and has previously competed in the 24 Hours at Daytona.

== Racing record ==
=== Career summary ===
Season	Series	Team	Races	Wins	Poles	F/Laps	Podiums	Points	Position
2018	F1600 Championship Series		12	0	0	0	0	175	17th
2019	F1600 Championship Series	Team Pelfrey	12	0	0	0	1	266	11th
2019	U.S. F2000 National Championship	Legacy Autosport	4	0	0	0	0	18	23rd
2020	Formula 4 United States Championship	Alliance Racing	5	0	0	0	0	0	36th
2020	U.S. F2000 National Championship	Legacy Autosport	5	0	0	0	0	30	22nd
2020	ARCA Menards Series	Visconti Motorsports	1	0	0	0	0	27	78th
2021	IMSA SportsCar Championship - LMP3	Performance Tech Motorsports	1	0	0	0	0	0	NC†
2022	IMSA SportsCar Championship - LMP3	Mühlner Motorsports America	1	0	0	0	0	0	NC†
2022	GB3 Championship	Chris Dittmann Racing	3	0	0	0	0	0	24th

=== ARCA Menards Series ===
(key) (Bold – Pole position awarded by qualifying time. Italics – Pole position earned by points standings or practice time. * – Most laps led.)

ARCA Menards Series results
Year	Team	No.	Make	1	2	3	4	5	6	7	8	9	10	11	12	13	14	15	16	17	18	19	20	AMSC	Pts	Ref
2020	Visconti Motorsports	74	Chevy	DAY	PHO	TAL	POC	IRP	KEN	IOW	KAN	TOL	TOL	MCH	DAY; 17	GTW	L44	TOL	BRI	WIN	MEM	ISF	KAN	78th	27	

=== Complete Formula 4 United States Championship results ===
(key) (Races in bold indicate pole position) (Races in italics indicate fastest lap)

Year	Team	1	2	3	4	5	6	7	8	9	10	11	12	13	14	15	16	17	18	DC	Points
2020	Alliance Racing	MOH; 1; 14	MOH; 2; 14	VIR; 1 Ret	VIR; 2; 18	VIR; 3; 11	BAR; 1	BAR; 2	BAR; 3	BAR; 4	SEB; 1	SEB; 2	SEB; 3	HMS; 1	HMS; 2	HMS; 3	COA; 1	COA; 2	COA; 3	36th	0

=== Complete American open–wheel racing results ===
==== U.S. F2000 National Championship ====
Year	Team	1	2	3	4	5	6	7	8	9	10	11	12	13	14	15	16	17	Rank	Points
2019	Legacy Autosport	STP; 1	STP; 2	IMS; 1	IMS; 2	LOR	ROA; 1	ROA; 2	TOR; 1	TOR; 1	MOH; 1	MOH; 2	POR; 1; 18	POR; 2; 16	LAG; 1; 16	LAG; 2; 16			23rd	19
2020	Legacy Autosport	ROA; 1; 12	ROA; 2; 16	MOH; 1; 13	MOH; 2; 19	MOH; 3; 15	LOR; 18	IMS; 1	IMS; 2	IMS; 3	MOH; 4	MOH; 5	MOH; 6	NJM; 1	NJM; 2	NJM; 3	STP; 1	STP; 2	22nd	30

=== Complete GB3 Championship results ===
(key) (Races in bold indicate pole position) (Races in italics indicate fastest lap)

Year	Team	1	2	3	4	5	6	7	8	9	10	11	12	13	14	15	16	17	18	19	20	21	22	23	24	DC	Points
2022	Chris Dittmann Racing	OUL; 1	OUL; 2	OUL; 3	SIL; 1	SIL; 2	SIL; 3	DON; 1	DON; 2	DON; 3	SNE; 1	SNE; 2	SNE; 3	SPA; 1	SPA; 2	SPA; 3	SIL; 1; 23	SIL; 2; 18	SIL; 3; 17	BHGP; 1	BHGP; 2	BHGP; 3	DON; 1	DON; 2	DON; 3	24th	3
