= Catalina Cuellar-Gempeler =

Colombian microbial ecologist

- Born: August 25, 1984 (age 42); Bogotá, Colombia
- Education: University of the Andes (B.Sc.); University of Texas at Austin (PhD)
- Scientific career
- Fields: Microbiology
- Workplaces: California State Polytechnic University, Humboldt

Catalina Cuellar-Gempeler (1984-) is a Colombian microbial ecologist and marine microbiologist, currently an associate professor at Cal Poly Humboldt. Her research focuses on understanding microbial metacommunity dynamics, eco-evolutionary dynamics, and ecosystem dynamics. Her research group, the CGlab uses host associated microbial communities as a model system to understand how processes of community assembly result in patterns of diversity and function. The lab's main emphasis is on the microbes used in digestion in the Californian and Eastern carnivorous pitcher plants. In March 2021, Cuellar-Gempeler was awarded an Early Career grant of $1 million by the National Science Foundation.

== Early life and education ==
Cuellar-Gempeler was born in 1984, in Bogotá, Colombia. She is the oldest of three children. Her father Carlos Cuellar Cubides is a Colombian gastroenterologist in Bogotá, while her mother, Emilia Gempeler, of Swiss descent, is a senior occupational health nurse. As a young child and teenager, Cuellar-Gempeler attended Helvetia school, a private multilingual (Spanish, German, French) Swiss school located in Suba, Bogotá, Colombia. As a child, she marveled at the diversity and beauty of the colombian country side, spending weekends and school breaks in Sasaima (Cundinamarca) with her maternal grandparents. After graduating high school first in her class, Cuellar-Gempeler started her studies at University of the Andes in Bogotá, graduating with both a B.Sc. in biology and a B.Sc. in microbiology in 2009. During her studies, Cuellar-Gempeler was an outstanding student, who thrived in all subjects ranging from cellular biology to chemistry and physics. Cuellar-Gempeler showed an interest in microbes early on, recognizing their role in major ecosystems during field trips to the Andes, the Amazon and the Caribbean coast in Colombia. When she was back home from the Sierra Nevada del Cocuy she couldn’t stop thinking about the microbes living around her, who have much shorter lifespans than humans. She attended graduate school at the University of Texas at Austin where she earned a PhD in integrative biology. Cuellar-Gempeler's PhD thesis focused on ecological and assembly processes driving crustacean-associated microbial communities.

== Academic career ==
After obtaining her PhD in 2016, Cuellar-Gempeler was hired as a post-doctoral scholar at Florida State University for two years, where she began working with carnivorous pitcher plants and their associated microbial communities. In 2018, she and her husband moved to Humboldt State University in Arcata, California, where she is now an associate professor. The Cuellar-Gempeler lab or CGLab investigates the functioning and assembly of microbial communities hosted by animals and plants. The lab's main research themes comprise ecological theory, microbiology and natural history.

== Research and teaching ==
Since the beginning of her academic career, Cuellar-Gempeler has been interested not only in understanding the interaction between metazoans and microorganisms, but also in environmental education. Before graduating from the University of the Andes, she took a semester off to take a field guiding course at Kruger National Park, South Africa, where she improved her knowledge about African ecosystems and her leading and teaching skills. As a PhD candidate at the University of Texas at Austin she worked as an assistant teacher for Molecules to Organisms, ecology, limnology and scientific inquiry. Currently, at her assistant professor appointment she is teaching general microbiology, microbial ecology and marine microbiology. Cuellar-Gempeler's lab main focus is on Biodiversity-Ecosystem function relationships in pitcher plant meta-communities, microbial ecology of conservation of Astragalus applegatei's mycorrhizae, and microbiome of invasive marine invertebrates. Her lab's main research areas are:

- Biodiversity-Ecosystem function relationships in pitcher plant metacommunities - Research exploring the degradative functioning of bacterial communities, with investigation mostly based on experimental studies and on field sampling of the microbial biodiversity in pitcher plants.
- Microbial ecology of conservation: Astragalus applegatei 's mycorrhizae - Research exploring the effect of oil microorganisms on the success of populations of endangered plants. This branch of research is being done in collaboration with Kerry Byrne.
- Microbiome of invasive marine invertebrates - Research investigating the variation of microbial communities within an invasive, wide-spread anemone. The main focus of this research is to understand which conditions are driving microbial community assembly. Will Ryan and Stacy Krueger-Hadfield from University of Alabama at Birmingham are collaborating on this project.

== Awards and honors ==
Cuellar-Gempeler has been awarded an Early Career grant for $1 million by the National Science Foundation. This award is given to outstanding academics who have great potential to become role models in their communities while engaging in both research and education.

== Selected publications ==
- C. Cuellar-Gempeler. 2021. Diversity-function relationships and the underlying ecological mechanisms in host-associated microbial communities. In: Advances in Environmental Microbiology, Vol 8. 297-326
- Munoz-Ucros, J., M. Zwetsloot, C. Cuellar-Gempeler and T. Bauerle. Spatio-temporal patterns of rhizosphere microbiome assembly: from ecological theory to agricultural application. Journal of Applied Ecology 58(5):894-904
- Cuellar-Gempeler, C. and P. Munguia. 2019. Habitat filters mediate successional trajectories in bacterial communities associated with the striped shore crab. Oecologia 191(4): 957-970
- T.E. Miller, M. L. Buhler and C. Cuellar-Gempeler. 2019. Species-specific differences determine responses to a resource pulse and predation. Oecologia 190(1) 169-178
- C. Cuellar-Gempeler, and M. Leibold. 2019. Key colonist pools and habitat filters mediate diversity of fiddler crab-associated microbial communities. Ecology 100(4): e02628
- C. Cuellar-Gempeler and M.A. Leibold, 2018. Multiple colonist pools shape fiddler crab-associated microbial communities. The ISME Journal 12:825-837. Accession number: PRJNA496296
- E. Canter, C. Cuellar-Gempeler, A. Pastore, T.E. Miller and O. Mason, 2018. Predator identity more than predator richness structures aquatic microbial assemblages in Sarracenia purpurea leaves. Ecology
- Holdridge, E., C. Cuellar-Gempeler, and C. terHost, 2016. A shift from exploitation to interference competition with increasing density affects population and community dynamics. Ecology and Evolution 6 (15):5333-5341
- Cuellar-Gempeler, C. and P. Munguia. 2013. Fiddler crabs affect bacterial assemblages in mangrove forest sediments. Community Ecology 14(1): 59-66
