= Tatiana Calderón =

Colombian race car driver (born 1993)

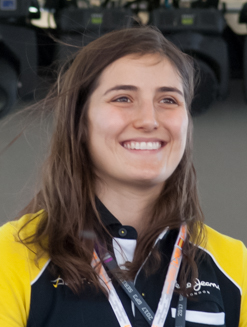
- Calderón in 2017
- Nationality: Colombian
- Full name: Tatiana Calderón Noguera
- Born: 10 March 1993 (age 33) Bogotá, Colombia

IMSA SportsCar Championship career
- Debut season: 2020
- Current team: Gradient Racing
- Categorisation: FIA Silver
- Former teams: GEAR Racing powered by GRT Grasser
- Starts: 9
- Championships: 0
- Wins: 0
- Podiums: 0
- Poles: 0
- Fastest laps: 0
- Best finish: 40th in 2025

Previous series
- 2023 2022 2020–21 2019 2016–18 2015–16 2013–15 2013 2011–13 2010–11: European Le Mans Series; IndyCar Series; Super Formula Championship; FIA Formula 2 Championship; GP3 Series; MRF Challenge; FIA European F3; British F3 Championship; European F3 Open; Pro Mazda Championship

IndyCar Series career
- 7 races run over 1 year
- 2022 position: 29th
- Best finish: 29th (2022)
- First race: 2022 Firestone Grand Prix of St. Petersburg (St. Petersburg)
- Last race: 2022 Honda Indy 200 (Mid-Ohio)
Wins	Podiums	Poles
0	0	0

Tatiana Calderón Noguera (born 10 March 1993) is a Colombian racing driver who currently competes in the NASCAR Brasil Series for SG28 Racing and serves as test driver for the Formula 2 and Formula 3 Championships. Calderón previously drove for the Drago Corse with ThreeBond squad in the Super Formula Championship and for Richard Mille Racing in the FIA World Endurance Championship.

Born into a family of car dealers, Calderón began racing go-karts at the age of nine, and was the first woman to win national karting championships in either Colombia or the United States. She progressed to car racing at the age of 17 in the Star Mazda Championship, taking two podiums in the 2011 season, a race victory in the 2014 Florida Winter Series, and was runner-up in the 2015–16 MRF Challenge Formula 2000 Championship. Calderón was the first woman to stand on the podium in the British Formula 3 International Series and the first to lead a lap in the FIA Formula 3 European Championship. From 2016 to 2018, she competed in the GP3 Series and later the 2019 Formula 2 Championship. Calderón was employed by the Sauber Formula One team (later Alfa Romeo Racing) as a development and test driver from 2018 to 2021.

== Early and personal life ==
Calderón was born in Colombia's capital of Bogotá on 10 March 1993 to Alberto Calderón Palau and María Clara Noguera Calderón. Alberto is the first cousin of Juan Manuel Santos, a former President of Colombia, and María is the daughter of Rodrigo Noguera Laborde, the co-founder of the Sergio Arboleda University. Her parents operate a Kia dealership in Bogotá. Calderón has an older sister named Paula, who co-manages the career of her younger sibling with former driver Fernando Plata, and a younger brother, Felipe. She was educated at Colegio Helvetia in Bogotá from 1997 to 2011, learning English and German, along with her native Spanish, and accommodated her racing with her education, sometimes having to miss weeks of school. Calderón played football, tennis, field hockey, golf, and tried horse riding before settling on motor racing at the age of nine. Since 2012, she has lived in the Spanish capital of Madrid.

== Racing career ==
=== Karting (2002–2008) ===
When Calderón was four years old, she first drove around Bogotá's streets while perched on her father's lap and holding the steering wheel of the family vehicle. She was introduced to racing by her sister, and aged nine began driving go-karts visiting a rental race track north of Bogotá in the city's 170th street close to the family home with Paula and some of her friends. The two siblings went to the track every night after school and on weekends. Around the age of ten Calderón began seriously considering a possible motor racing career. She persuaded her father greatly to purchase a green go-kart and a 50cc motorcycle for personal use on her family's farm, and he taught her about the mechanics of racing. Calderón's mother tried to sway her away from racing because she believed it was too dangerous, though she later supported her daughter's career choice on the condition she maintained good grades in school. Calderón was inspired by Juan Pablo Montoya's achievements and Ayrton Senna, a three-time Formula One World Champion.

Calderón was frequently rammed by her male competitors as she started to win races, so she had to respond to show that she was unfazed. She became the first female Colombian national karting champion in 2005 when she won the EasyKart National Championship. She was third in the Stars of Karting Este Division, won the Rotax Junior Division of the Colombian Kart Championship and was runner-up in the EasyKart National Championship the following year. Calderón drove her first racing car aged 14, sharing a Kia Picanto with her sister. Around this time, the owners of her local go-kart track later let her drive a professional four-stroke go-kart after she began winning races. In 2008, she became the first woman to win the Snap-On-Stars of Karting Divisional Championship-JICA Eastern Championship and the IAME International Challenge series. The former achievement made Calderón the first woman champion of a national American karting series.

=== Early career (2009–2014) ===
After winning the Snap-On-Stars of Karting Divisional Championship-JICA Eastern Championship, she told her parents of her decision to focus on racing and not enroll at university. Calderón had more success in 2009 when she made her sports car debut, coming second in the Radical European Master Series – SR5 with one victory and ten podium finishes, accruing 240 points for the PoleVision team. She finished second in that year's Colombian Rotax Senior Max Challenge. Aged seventeen, Calderón moved into open-wheel racing, driving in the Star Mazda Championship (part of the Road to Indy programme) in 2010 for Juncos Racing in its No. 25 car. She had five top-ten finishes, with a best of seventh in the first Autobahn Country Club race. In thirteen races, Calderón finished with 320 points for a final championship position of tenth. She also won the Colombian Rotax Championship that year.

Calderón joined the Derek Daly Academy driver development programme in early 2011 after reading a book authored by Daly. While Daly advised Calderón and helped her to transition to driving more powerful cars, she stayed with Juncos Racing for the 2011 Star Mazda Championship and changed her car number to 10. Calderón took two third-place finishes at Barber Motorsports Park and Canadian Tire Motorsport Park. These results made her the first woman to mount the podium in Star Mazda Championship history. Her final championship position was sixth with 322 points scored. Calderón entered the final three rounds of the 2011 European F3 Open Championship for Team West-Tec in October, scoring three points by finishing eighth in the second Circuit de Catalunya race, placing 21st in the drivers' standings.

Calderón entered into discussions to compete in Indy Lights for the 2012 season but she declined due to her and her father's dislike of oval tracks. Around this time, Calderón began working with racer Andy Soucek to better her driving ability. That year, she raced the entire 2012 European F3 Open Championship with EmiliodeVillota Motorsport with team owner Emilio de Villota as her race engineer. Calderón finished the season with eight top-ten finishes for ninth in the championship and 56 points scored. In October, she drove the final two weekends of the 2012 Formula Renault 2.0 Alps Series for AV Formula, scoring no points to place 33rd in the standings. Two months later, Calderón flew to Colombia to enter the 6 Hours of Bogotá in a No. 91 Radical car that she shared with Juan Camilo Acosta, Juan Esteban García and Luis Carlos Martínez, finishing third overall and second in class.

For the 2013 season, Calderón joined Double R Racing for both the FIA Formula 3 European Championship and the British Formula 3 International Series. Before that, Calderón entered the five-round, fifteen-race New Zealand-based Toyota Racing Series with ETEC Motorsport as the series' sole woman driver. That year, she became the first woman to stand on the overall podium in British Formula 3 history with a third-place finish at the Nürburgring round. She scored no points in the European series, in part because of tyre issues, and Double R Racing's inexperience competing in the championship. In July, Calderón finished 20th in the Masters of Formula 3 at Circuit Zandvoort. In late October, she tested an Auto GP car in a two-day test session at the Circuito de Jerez. She made a guest appearance for EmiliodeVillota Motorsport in the season-ending European F3 Open Championship round at the Circuit de Catalunya but was ineligible to score points.

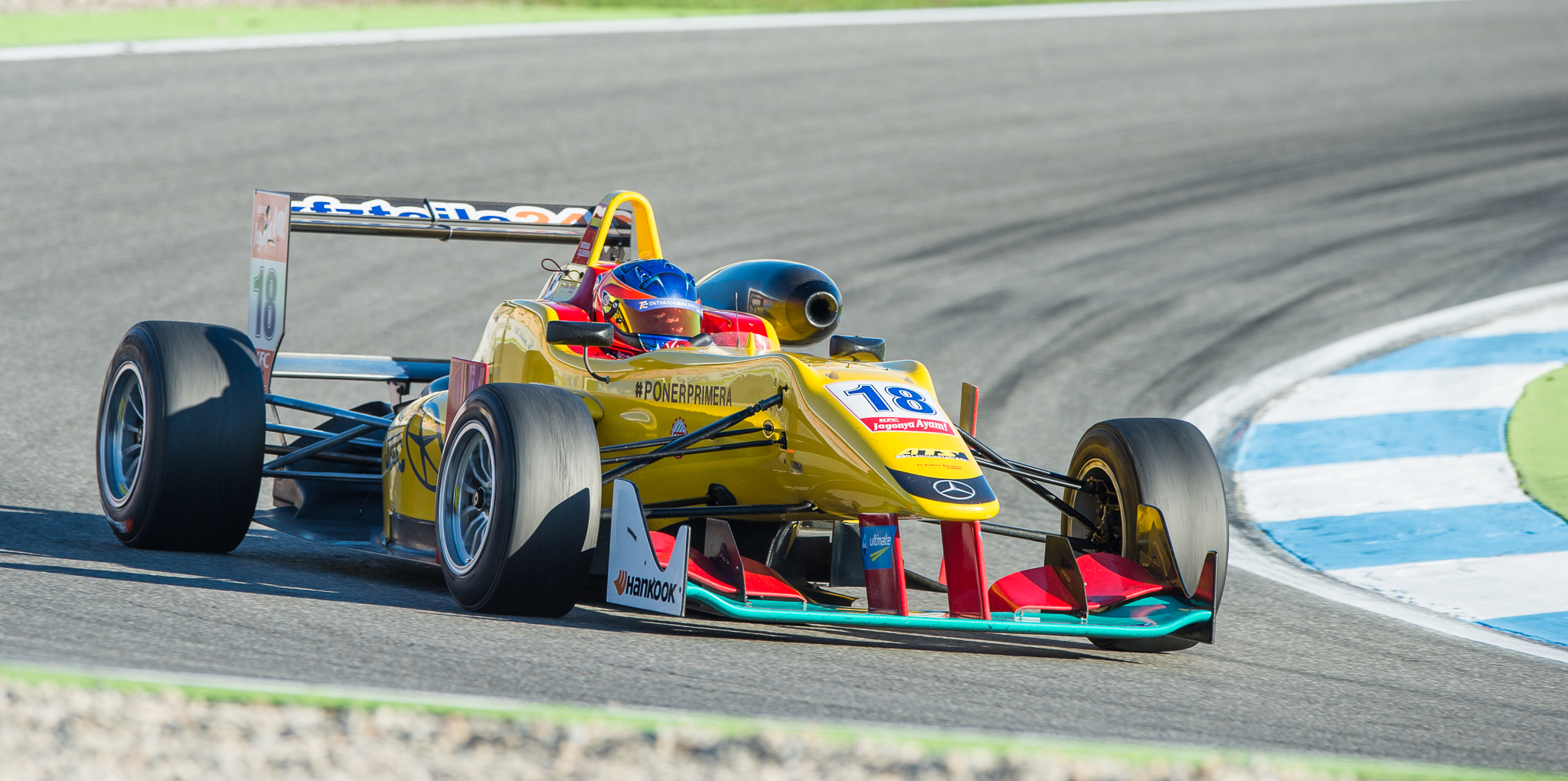
Competing for Jo Zeller Racing at the Hockenheimring in 2014

During the 2014 Florida Winter Series Calderón won her first open-wheel race at Sebring International Raceway. She finished fifth in the championship standings with two more top five finishes. Not long after, Calderón returned to Europe and entered the EuroFormula Open Winter series round at Circuit Paul Ricard, finishing fourth for EmiliodeVillota Motorsport. She had originally signed for Signature Team days before the 2014 FIA Formula 3 European Championship began; a lack of testing time and the misgivings of her being noncompetitive due to the car's under-powered engine led her to join Jo Zeller Racing. (Note: Calderón raced a Jo Zeller Racing car prepared by Mücke Motorsport at the season-opening round at the Silverstone Circuit in place of Sandro Zeller.) During the season, in which she was advised by Anthony Hamilton, the father of driver Lewis Hamilton, regular points-scoring finishes put her 15th in the drivers' standings. In November, Calderón became the first woman to contest the Macau Grand Prix since Cathy Muller in 1983, finishing 13th.

=== Formula 3 and GP3 Series (2015–2018) ===
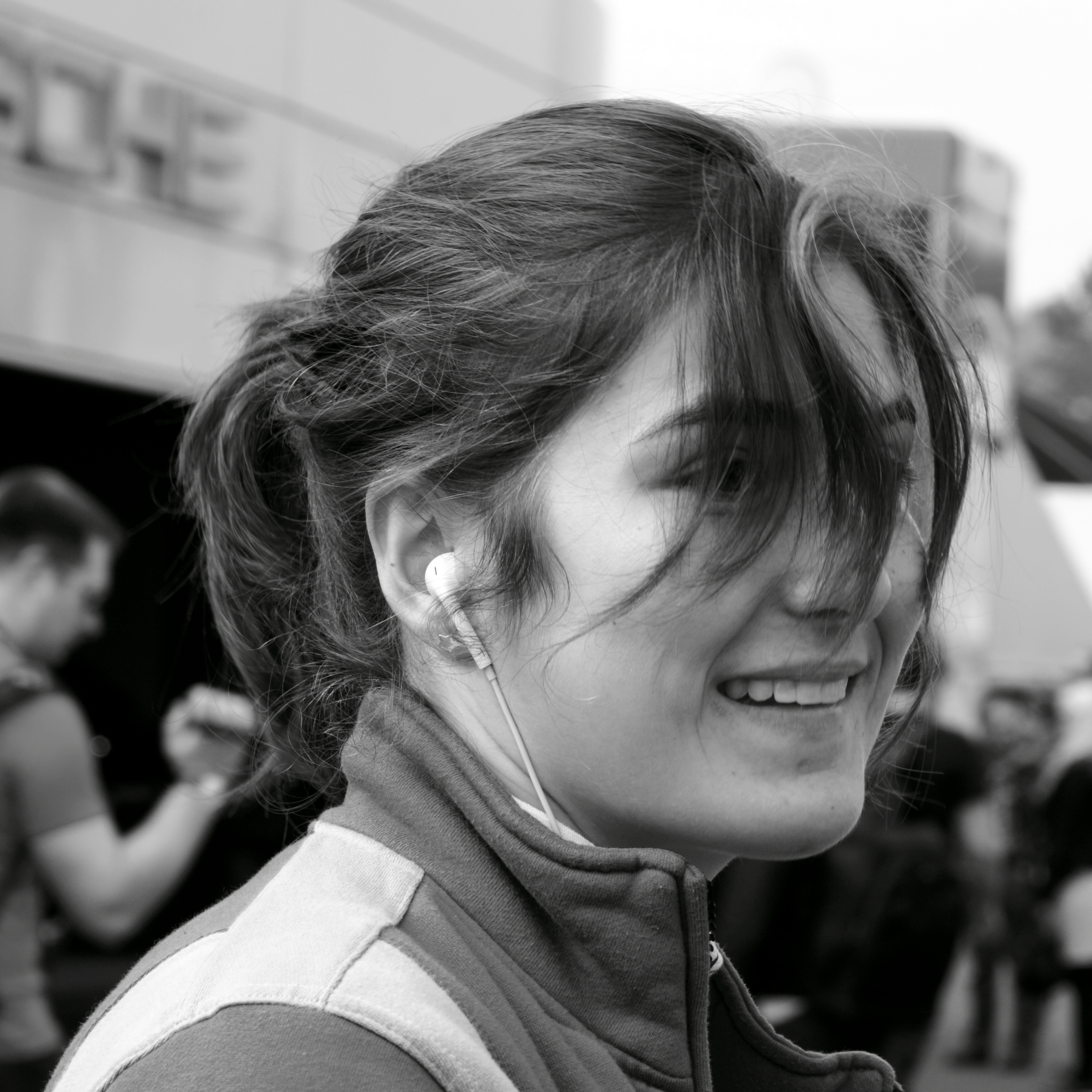
Calderón as a Carlin driver in 2015

In late 2014, driver Susie Wolff began to mentor and advise Calderón. She moved to Carlin for the 2015 FIA Formula 3 European Championship after testing with the team in December 2014. Calderón briefly led the rain-affected third race at Spa-Francorchamps, becoming the first woman to lead a series race. She scored no points to go unranked in the 33-race season. During the 2015–2016 season, Calderón drove in the MRF Challenge Formula 2000 Championship for MRF Racing, where she developed a reputation for risky overtaking because the cars' low downforce allowed them to run close together. She consistently finished in the top five, winning at the Dubai Autodrome and was runner-up to Pietro Fittipaldi in the points standings.

Due to a regulation introduced by motorsport's governing body, the Fédération Internationale de l'Automobile, in late 2015 limiting drivers to three full seasons in European F3, Calderón was ineligible to enter the series for a fourth consecutive season. She instead contested the 2016 GP3 Series for Arden International and was the team's first woman driver in history. She had tested a World Series Formula V8 3.5 car with Pons Racing at Ciudad del Motor de Aragón in November 2015 before choosing GP3 two months later because it was faster. Calderón scored two points from tenth-place finishes at the Hockenheimring and the Autodromo Nazionale Monza for 21st in the drivers' championship. She was slow in qualifying, giving her an average starting position of seventeenth. Calderón was third at the Red Bull Ring and took 66 points for Teo Martín Motorsport and then RP Motorsport in six rounds of the Euroformula Open Championship. She was also a panellist on the Canal F1 Latin America show Directo Fórmula.

At the end of 2016, Calderón was introduced to the Sauber Formula One team principal Monisha Kaltenborn and began working for Sauber as a development driver. In addition to continuing her GP3 schedule, she conducted tests in Sauber's simulator and joined the team at race weekends. Calderón switched teams from Arden to DAMS for the 2017 season. She had a best result of seventh at the Monza feature race and was eighth at the Circuito de Jerez to finish eighteenth in the drivers' championship with seven points. Calderón drove in the series-ending round of the World Series Formula V8 3.5 at Bahrain International Circuit in place of Damiano Fioravanti at RP Motorsport. She finished third in the second race, taking the first podium finish for a woman in the series.

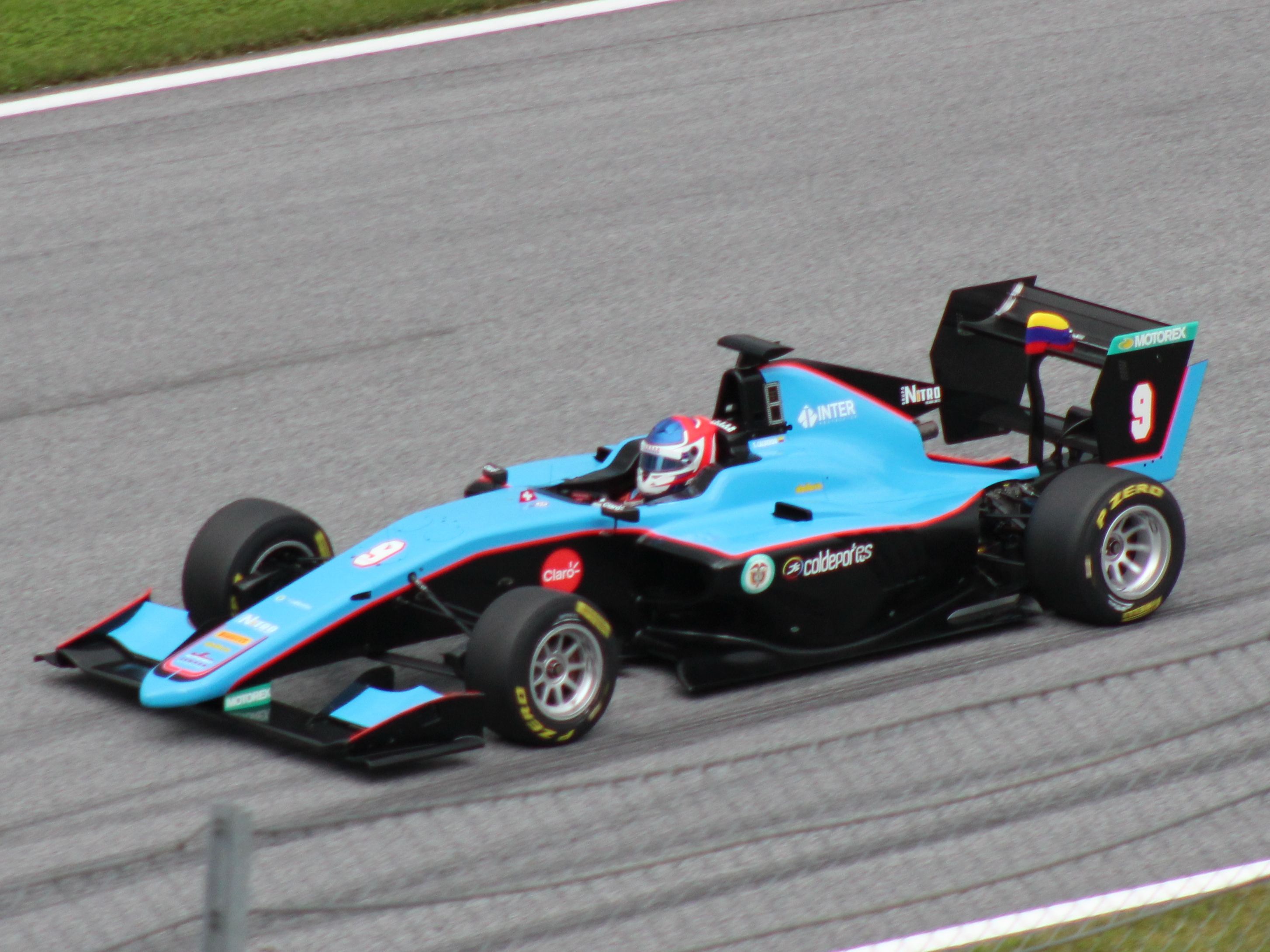
Driving for Jenzer Motorsport at the Red Bull Ring in 2018.

Calderón moved to Jenzer Motorsport for the 2018 GP3 Series after DAMS left the championship. A month later, Sauber made Calderón its test driver, spending time in the team's simulator and engineers coached her at its headquarters and race circuits. (Note: Simona de Silvestro was employed by Sauber as an affiliate driver during 2014.) In GP3, her performance improved from 2017, scoring eleven points over seven races for a championship placing of sixteenth. After Calderón expressed her hope of testing for Sauber before the year was over, she drove the team's C37 in a promotional day at the Autódromo Hermanos Rodríguez on 30 October, becoming the first Latin American woman to drive a Formula One car. Calderón drove a 2013 C32 car in a two-day test session at the Fiorano Circuit a month later. On 16 December, she tested the Techeetah DS E-TENSE FE19 electric car at the inaugural Formula E in-season test in Ad Diriyah, and drove it again in the series' rookie test at Marrakesh's Circuit International Automobile Moulay El Hassan on 13 January 2019.

=== Formula 2 and Super Formula (2019–2022) ===
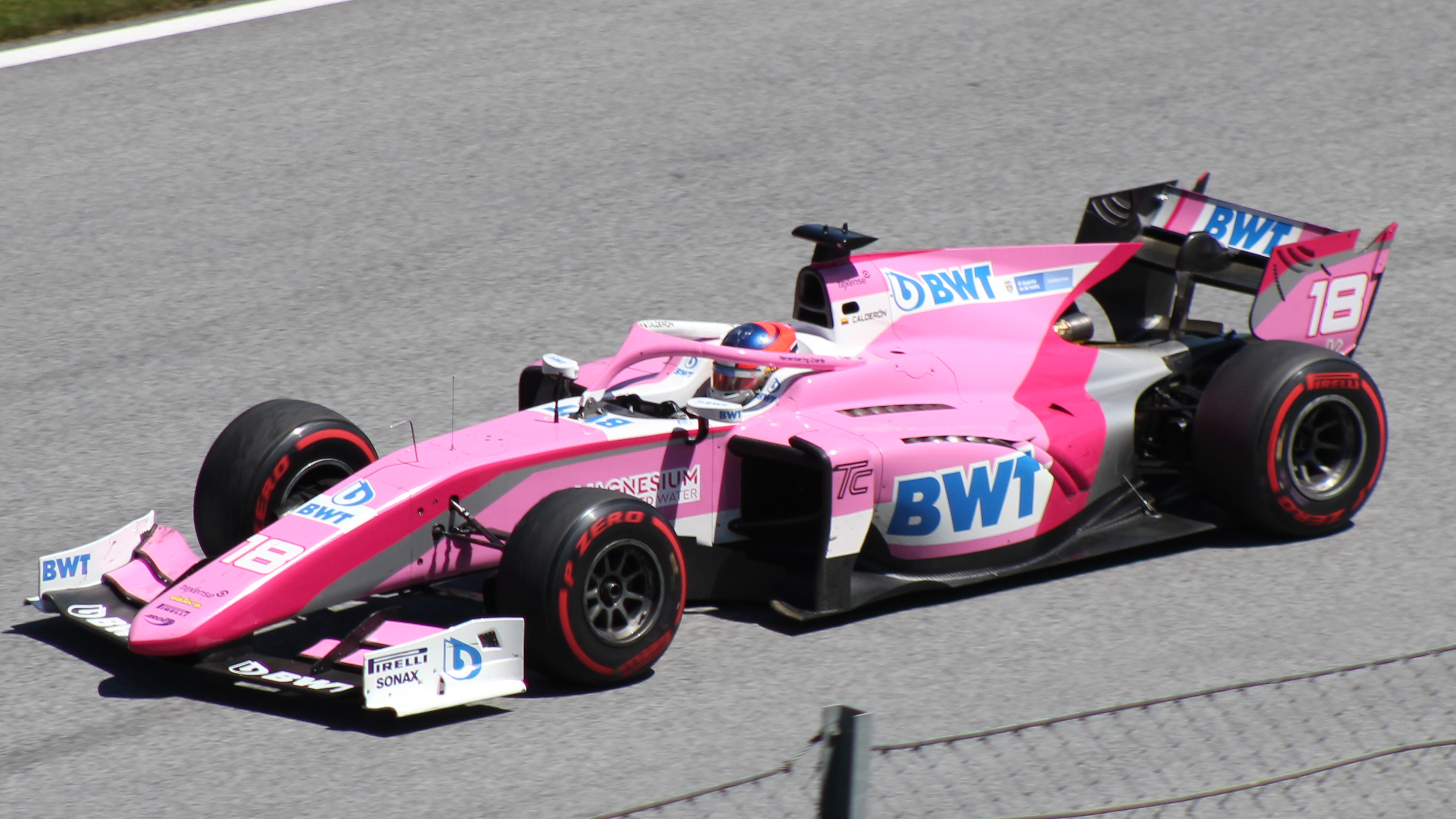
Calderon at the 2019 Spielberg Formula 2 round with BWT Arden

Calderón returned to Arden for the 2019 Formula 2 Championship and became the first woman to drive in the series. The renamed Alfa Romeo Racing team retained her as its test driver for the year. She stated that her two Formula One test sessions assisted her acclimatisation to Formula 2. At the Baku feature race, Calderón became the first woman in history to lead a lap in Formula 2. Poor qualifying results from a lack of tyre preparation led her to employ different strategies to gain position in a feature race. She had two race engineers during the season. Calderón had a best finish of eleventh at Circuit Paul Ricard and was 22nd in the drivers' standings with no points scored. Late in the year, she obtained sponsorship that allowed her to enter the season-ending Autódromo Hermanos Rodríguez double header round of the Porsche Supercup in Team Project 1's No. 24 911 GT3 Cup car, retiring from the first race and finishing 25th and last in the second.

Following the purchase of Arden's Formula 2 entry for the 2020 season by HWA Racelab and the signing of drivers Giuliano Alesi and Artem Markelov, Calderón left the team and sought a career in either American or endurance racing. As a result, she left Formula 2 to join the Super Formula Championship with Drago Corse with ThreeBond for the 2020 season. Team owner Ryo Michigami negotiated with her late in December 2019 and concluded with an agreement not long after. Michigami selected Calderón over Nobuharu Matsushita for the seat and she spoke to him regularly about the SF19 car. In addition to her Super Formula seat she remained at Alfa Romeo's Formula One team as a test driver. Calderón worked with the reserve driver Robert Kubica to develop its C39 car, and was appointed an ambassador for the team. She also entered three rounds of the 2019–20 F3 Asian Championship with Seven GP, taking six top-ten finishes for 31 points and thirteenth in the drivers' standings.

In August 2022, Calderón joined Charouz Racing System, replacing Cem Bölükbaşı for the concluding four rounds of the 2022 Formula 2 Championship with financing from pop singer Karol G. She injured her right hand in an accident with Olli Caldwell in the Monza sprint race and she spent the following two months recuperating with the help of therapy to regain her strength in her arm and injured hand. Calderón finished the year 28th in the Drivers' Championship and achieved no points-scoring finishes. Calderón left Charouz Racing System at the conclusion of the season due to her not having enough sponsorship funding in order for her to continue to race in Formula One's support categories or IndyCar.

=== Sports car racing (2020–2025) ===
Calderón entered the 2020 24 Hours of Daytona (part of the IMSA SportsCar Championship) alongside Rahel Frey, Katherine Legge and Christina Nielsen in the No. 19 GEAR Racing Lamborghini Huracán GT3 Evo. (Note: Ana Beatriz was due to partner Calderón at Daytona before she withdrew due to pregnancy.) Calderón prepared for the race by increasing her fitness regime and sleeping less in case she was told to drive early in the morning. Multiple car issues relegated the team to a sixteenth-place finish in class. She shared a Le Mans Prototype 2 (LMP2) Oreca 07-Gibson car in the European Le Mans Series (ELMS) with Sophia Flörsch on the all-female Signatech-run Richard Mille Racing team in 2020. Calderón finished the ELMS season with three top-tens for eleventh in the Drivers' Championship with 19.5 points and was 23rd in the Super Formula Championship with zero points. In September, she made her 24 Hours of Le Mans debut alongside Flörsch and Beitske Visser, finishing ninth in LMP2 and 13th overall.

In 2021, Calderón raced in the FIA World Endurance Championship (WEC) in the No. 1 Richard Mille Racing-run Oreca 07-Gibson LMP2 car with Flörsch and Visser and continued to drive for the single car Drago Corse team in the Super Formula Championship. She was also retained as Alfa Romeo's test and development driver. Calderón's WEC season saw her finish seventeenth in the LMP2 Drivers' Championship with 23 points with four top-ten finishes in the five races that she entered. She concluded the Super Formula season without scoring any points in the four races she drove for 24th in the championship standings.

Calderón signed to drive for the Team Virage squad in the LMP2 Pro-Am class of the ELMS in the 2023 ELMS season alongside Rob Hodes and Ian Rodríguez in its Oreca 07 entry. She ended the season 16th in the LMP2 Pro/Am Drivers' Championship with five top-tens and one pole position. Calderón joined Legge, Stevan McAleer and Sheena Monk as a driver of Gradient Racing's No. 66 Acura NSX GT3 Evo22 for the five-round North American Endurance Cup in the GTD category of the 2024 IMSA SportsCar Championship, joined by Stevan McAleer for the 2024 24 Hours of Daytona. She concluded the season with no top-ten finishes and was 41st in the class standings with 883 points.

=== IndyCar Series and Formula E (2022, 2025) ===
Calderón tested Sébastien Bourdais' No. 14 A. J. Foyt Enterprises-prepared Dallara-Chevrolet car for 87 laps during a single day at Mid-Ohio Sports Car Course in July 2021 through a sponsorship agreement. She prepared for two weeks learning the circuit and the car and received coaching and mentoring.

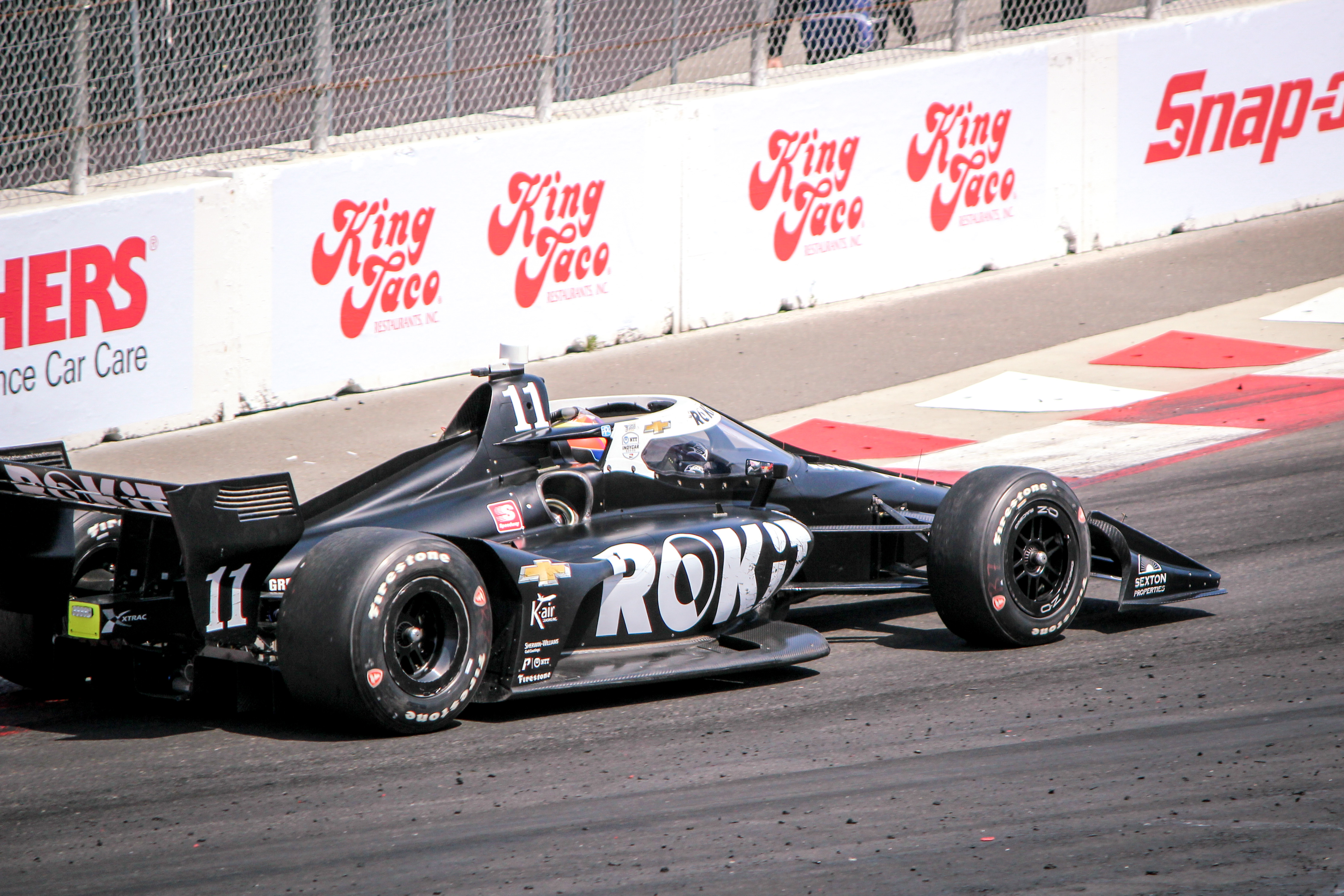
Calderón during the 2022 Acura Grand Prix of Long Beach

Calderón impressed A. J. Foyt Enterprises with her performance, and the team considered her a potential driver for the 2022 IndyCar Series. She left Alfa Romeo in 2021, and signed to drive the No. 11 A. J. Foyt Enterprises Dallara-Chevrolet vehicle, originally for each of the twelve street and road course rounds of the 2022 IndyCar Series; she was replaced by J. R. Hildebrand for the oval track races. Calderón struggled to acclimatise to the circuits she raced at owing to restrictions on testing that limited her to a single pre-season test session, her lack of IndyCar track knowledge as well as adapting to new tyres and a car requiring physical effort. After competing in seven races, she was sidelined due to repeated missed payments by her team's primary sponsor. She ended the season 29th in the drivers' standings with 58 points scored.

In February 2025, Calderón joined Lola Yamaha ABT to participate in the Formula E rookie free practice session coinciding the Jeddah ePrix. She returned in October later that year, where she was selected by Citroën Racing to participate in the all women's test at the Circuit Ricardo Tormo.

=== Stock car racing (2026–present) ===
In 2026, Calderón was scheduled to join the Brazilian Stock Car Pro Series with new team SG28 Racing – however, after the teams' cars were delivered late and without the required running gear, she switched to the NASCAR Brasil Series. On 20 September 2026, at the Circuito dos Cristais, Calderón became the first woman to win a race in the NASCAR Brasil Series.

== Driving style ==
Calderón describes herself as a smooth driver; she feels she reacts better to more powerful cars and in wet weather. She exercises hard to be able to handle a high-performance racing car because women often have on average less muscular mass than men. She said that she increased the thickness of her neck by 9 cm (3.5 in) while training to deal with the high amount of g-force that she feels in a Formula One car. Calderón's short stature of 5 ft 4 in (1.63 m) makes it challenging for her to find the right angle and maximise arm force. The GP3 Series regulations prevented her from having a rest placed at the back of her helmet. Calderón also spent half of the 2016 season figuring out where she liked to sit, making it touch her legs when steering and decided to adjust the position of her car pedals for more comfort.

== Racing record ==
=== Career summary ===
Season	Series	Team	Races	Wins	Poles	F/Laps	Podiums	Points	Position
2009	Radical European Master Series - SR5	Hope Pole Vision Racing	10	1	0	0	10	240	**2nd**
2010	Star Mazda Championship	Juncos Racing	13	0	0	0	0	320	10th
2011	Star Mazda Championship	Juncos Racing	11	0	0	0	2	322	6th
2011	European F3 Open	Team West-Tec	6	0	0	0	0	2	21st
2012	European F3 Open	EmiliodeVillota Motorsport	16	0	0	0	0	56	9th
2012	Formula Renault 2.0 Alps	AV Formula	4	0	0	0	0	0	33rd
2013	FIA Formula 3 European Championship	Double R Racing	30	0	0	0	0	0	32nd
2013	British Formula 3 International Series	Double R Racing	12	0	0	0	1	79	7th
2013	Masters of Formula 3	Double R Racing	1	0	0	0	0	N/A	20th
2013	Toyota Racing Series	ETEC Motorsport	15	0	0	0	0	432	12th
2014	FIA Formula 3 European Championship	Jo Zeller Racing	33	0	0	0	0	29	15th
2014	Macau Grand Prix	Mücke Motorsport	1	0	0	0	0	N/A	13th
2014	Florida Winter Series	Ferrari Driver Academy	12	1	0	1	1	N/A	5th
2015	FIA Formula 3 European Championship	Carlin	33	0	0	0	0	0	27th
2015–16	MRF Challenge Formula 2000 Championship	MRF Racing	14	1	0	1	7	199	**2nd**
2016	GP3 Series	Arden International	18	0	0	0	0	2	21st
2016	Euroformula Open Championship	Teo Martín Motorsport	10	0	0	0	1	66	9th
2016	Spanish Formula 3 Championship	Teo Martín Motorsport	6	0	0	0	0	32	6th
2017	GP3 Series	DAMS	15	0	0	0	0	7	18th
2017	World Series Formula V8 3.5	RP Motorsport	2	0	0	0	1	25	14th
2018	GP3 Series	Jenzer Motorsport	18	0	0	0	0	11	16th
2018	Formula One	Alfa Romeo Sauber F1 Team	Test/Development driver						
2018–19	Formula E	DS Techeetah	Test driver						
2019	FIA Formula 2 Championship	BWT Arden	22	0	0	0	0	0	22nd
2019	Porsche Supercup	Team Project 1 - FACH	2	0	0	0	0	0	NC
2019	Formula One	Alfa Romeo Racing	Test driver						
2019–20	F3 Asian Championship	Seven GP	9	0	0	0	0	31	13th
2020	Super Formula	Drago Corse with ThreeBond	5	0	0	0	0	0	23rd
2020	European Le Mans Series - LMP2	Richard Mille Racing Team	4	0	0	0	0	19.5	11th
2020	24 Hours of Le Mans - LMP2	Richard Mille Racing Team	1	0	0	0	0	N/A	9th
2020	IMSA SportsCar Championship - GTD	GEAR Racing powered by GRT Grasser	1	0	0	0	0	15	57th
2020	Formula One	Alfa Romeo Racing Orlen	Test driver						
2021	Super Formula	Drago Corse with ThreeBond	4	0	0	0	0	0	24th
2021	FIA World Endurance Championship - LMP2	Richard Mille Racing Team	5	0	0	0	0	23	17th
2021	24 Hours of Le Mans - LMP2	Richard Mille Racing Team	1	0	0	0	0	N/A	DNF
2021	Formula One	Alfa Romeo Racing Orlen	Test driver						
2022	IndyCar Series	A. J. Foyt Racing	7	0	0	0	0	58	29th
2022	FIA Formula 2 Championship	Charouz Racing System	7	0	0	0	0	0	28th
2023	European Le Mans Series - LMP2 Pro-Am	Team Virage	6	0	1	0	0	24	16th
2024	IMSA SportsCar Championship - GTD	Gradient Racing	5	0	0	0	0	883	41st
2025	IMSA SportsCar Championship - GTD	Gradient Racing	3	0	0	0	0	613	40th
2026	NASCAR Brasil Series	SG28 Racing by Pole Motorsport	2	0	0	0	0	2	18th*
2026	NASCAR Brasil Challenge Championship	SG28 Racing by Pole Motorsport	2	0	0	0	0	18	8th*
2026	Stock Car Pro Series	SG28 by RTR	0	0	0	0	0	0	36th*
2026	GT Challenge de las Américas - GTS Turbo	NACent Racing	2	1	1		2		
2026	Lamborghini Super Trofeo North America - Pro	RAFA Racing Team	2	0	0	0	0	1	24th

^{†} As Calderón was a guest driver, she was ineligible for points. ^{*} Season still in progress.

=== American open–wheel racing results ===
==== Complete Star Mazda Championship results ====
Year	Team	1	2	3	4	5	6	7	8	9	10	11	12	13	Rank	Points	Ref
2010	Juncos Racing	SEB; 20	STP; 19	LAG; 9	IRP; 11	IOW; 12	NJ1; 11	NJ2; 9	ACC; 7	ACC; 11	TRO; 9	ROA; 8	MOS; 16	ATL; 11	10th	320	
2011	Juncos Racing	STP; 18	BAR; 3	IRP; 9	MIL; 9	IOW; 5	MOS; 3	TRO; 12	TRO; 8	SON; 5	BAL; 8	LAG; 7			6th	322	

==== IndyCar Series ====
(key) (Races in bold indicate pole position; races in italics indicate fastest lap)

Year	Team	No.	Chassis	Engine	1	2	3	4	5	6	7	8	9	10	11	12	13	14	15	16	17	Rank	Points	Ref
2022	A. J. Foyt Enterprises	11	Dallara DW12	Chevrolet	STP; 24	TXS	LBH; 16	ALA; 26	IMS; 15	INDY	DET; 23	ROA; 25	MOH; 25	TOR	IOW	IOW	IMS	NSH	GTW	POR	LAG	29th	58	

=== Complete Euroformula Open Championship results ===
(key) (Races in bold indicate pole position; races in italics indicate fastest lap)

Year	Team	Class	1	2	3	4	5	6	7	8	9	10	11	12	13	14	15	16	Pos	Points
2011	Team West-Tec	A	VAL; 1	VAL; 2	MAG; 1	MAG; 2	SPA; 1	SPA; 2	BRH; 1	BRH; 2	ALG; 1	ALG; 2	MON; 1; 11	MON; 2; 10	JER; 1; 14	JER; 2; 13	CAT; 1; 17	CAT; 2; 8	21st	3
2012	Emilio de Villota Motorsport	A	ALG; 1 Ret	ALG; 2; 10	NÜR; 1 Ret	NÜR; 2; 11	SPA; 1; 14	SPA; 2; 9	BRH; 1; 12	BRH; 2; 10	LEC; 1; 5	LEC; 2; 7	HUN; 1; 4	HUN; 2; 7	MNZ; 1; 12	MNZ; 2; 16	CAT; 1; 8	CAT; 2; 7	9th	56
2016	Teo Martín Motorsport	A	EST; 1 Ret	EST; 2; 6	SPA; 1; 13	SPA; 2; 8	LEC; 1	LEC; 2	SIL; 1	SIL; 2									9th	66
2016	RP Motorsport	A									RBR; 1; 3	RBR; 2; 5	MNZ; 1	MNZ; 2	JER; 1; 6	JER; 2; 7	CAT; 1; 7	CAT; 2; 12	9th	66

=== Complete Formula Renault 2.0 Alps Series results ===
(key) (Races in bold indicate pole position; races in italics indicate fastest lap)

Year	Team	1	2	3	4	5	6	7	8	9	10	11	12	13	14	Pos	Points
2012	AV Formula	MNZ; 1	MNZ; 2	PAU; 1	PAU; 2	IMO; 1	IMO; 2	SPA; 1	SPA; 2	RBR; 1	RBR; 2	MUG; 1; 16	MUG; 2; 20	CAT; 1; 20	CAT; 2; 14	33rd	0

=== Complete British Formula Three Championship results ===
(key) (Races in bold indicate pole position; races in italics indicate fastest lap)

Year	Team	Class	1	2	3	4	5	6	7	8	9	10	11	12	Pos	Points
2013	Double R Racing	International	SIL; 1; 5	SIL; 2; 7	SIL; 3; 9	SPA; 1; 4	SPA; 2; 4	SPA; 3; 6	BRH; 1; 8	BRH; 2; 7	BRH; 3; 7	NÜR; 1; 6	NÜR; 2; 3	NÜR; 3; 8	7th	79

=== Complete FIA Formula 3 European Championship results ===
(key)

Year	Entrant	Engine	1	2	3	4	5	6	7	8	9	10	11	12	13	14	15	16	17	18	19	20	21	22	23	24	25	26	27	28	29	30	31	32	33	DC	Points	Ref
2013	Double R Racing	Mercedes	MNZ; 1; 19	MNZ; 2; 23	MNZ; 3; 21	SIL; 1; 22	SIL; 2; 19	SIL; 3; 15	HOC; 1; 26	HOC; 2; 26	HOC; 3; 23	BRH; 1; 22	BRH; 2; 25	BRH; 3; 20	RBR; 1; 21	RBR; 2; 20	RBR; 3; 17	NOR; 1 Ret	NOR; 2; 26	NOR; 3 Ret	NÜR; 1; 22	NÜR; 2; 20	NÜR; 3; 19	ZAN; 1; 21	ZAN; 2; 22	ZAN; 3; 24	VAL; 1; 20	VAL; 2; 20	VAL; 3; 20	HOC; 1; 21	HOC; 2; 22	HOC; 3 Ret				32nd	0	
2014	Jo Zeller Racing	Mercedes	SIL; 1; 23	SIL; 2; 18	SIL; 3; 19	HOC; 1; 18	HOC; 2; 22	HOC; 3; 18	PAU; 1; 18	PAU; 2 Ret	PAU; 3; 15	HUN; 1; 20	HUN; 2; 15	HUN; 3; 16	SPA; 1; 15	SPA; 2; 5	SPA; 3; 17	NOR; 1 Ret	NOR; 2 Ret	NOR; 3; 10	MSC; 1; 14	MSC; 2; 11	MSC; 3; 8	RBR; 1; 15	RBR; 2; 13	RBR; 3; 9	NÜR; 1 Ret	NÜR; 2; 9	NÜR; 3; 8	IMO; 1; 9	IMO; 2; 14	IMO; 3 Ret	HOC; 1; 12	HOC; 2; 8	HOC; 3 Ret	15th	29	
2015	Carlin	Volkswagen	SIL; 1; 20	SIL; 2 Ret	SIL; 3; 22	HOC; 1 Ret	HOC; 2; 21	HOC; 3; 25	PAU; 1; 17	PAU; 2; 19	PAU; 3 Ret	MNZ; 1; 17	MNZ; 2; 22	MNZ; 3; 13	SPA; 1; 25	SPA; 2; 25	SPA; 3; 18	NOR; 1; 14	NOR; 2; 12	NOR; 3; 14	ZAN; 1; 19	ZAN; 2; 11	ZAN; 3; 14	RBR; 1; 13	RBR; 2; 21	RBR; 3; 16	ALG; 1; 29	ALG; 2 Ret	ALG; 3; 15	NÜR; 1; 20	NÜR; 2; 15	NÜR; 3 Ret	HOC; 1; 18	HOC; 2; 21	HOC; 3; 24	27th	0	

=== Complete Macau Grand Prix results ===
Year	Team	Car	Qualifying	Quali Race	Main race	Refs
2014	(Germany) Mücke Motorsport	Dallara F312	21st	16th	13th	

=== Complete MRF Challenge Formula 2000 Championship results ===
(key) (Races in bold indicate pole position; races in italics indicate fastest lap)

Year	1	2	3	4	5	6	7	8	9	10	11	12	13	14	Pos	Points
2015–16	ABU; 1; 5	ABU; 2; 2	ABU; 3; 3	ABU; 4; 2	BHR; 1; 3	BHR; 2; 6	DUB; 1; 4	DUB; 2; 1	DUB; 3; 4	DUB; 4; 3	CHE; 1; 5	CHE; 2; 4	CHE; 3; 4	CHE; 4; 3	2nd	199

=== Complete GP3 Series results ===
(key) (Races in bold indicate pole position) (Races in italics indicate fastest lap) (Small number denotes finishing position)

Year	Entrant	1	2	3	4	5	6	7	8	9	10	11	12	13	14	15	16	17	18	Pos	Points
2016	Arden International	CAT; FEA; 14	CAT; SPR; 18	RBR; FEA; 20	RBR; SPR; Ret	SIL; FEA; 17	SIL; SPR; 20	HUN; FEA; 21	HUN; SPR; 21	HOC; FEA; 10	HOC; SPR; 9	SPA; FEA; 14	SPA; SPR; Ret	MNZ; FEA; 10	MNZ; SPR; 16	SEP; FEA; Ret	SEP; SPR; 15	YMC; FEA; Ret	YMC; SPR; Ret	21st	2
2017	DAMS	CAT; FEA; 14	CAT; SPR; Ret	RBR; FEA; 13	RBR; SPR; 12	SIL; FEA; 14	SIL; SPR; 15	HUN; FEA; Ret	HUN; SPR; 13	SPA; FEA; 16	SPA; SPR; 13	MNZ; FEA; 7	MNZ; SPR; C	JER; FEA; 13	JER; SPR; 8	YMC; FEA; 16	YMC; SPR; 15			18th	7
2018	Jenzer Motorsport	CAT; FEA; Ret	CAT; SPR; Ret	LEC; FEA; 17	LEC; SPR; 16	RBR; FEA; 12	RBR; SPR; 12	SIL; FEA; Ret	SIL; SPR; 10	HUN; FEA; 11	HUN; SPR; 8	SPA; FEA; 10	SPA; SPR; 9	MNZ; FEA; 15	MNZ; SPR; 6	SOC; FEA; 10	SOC; SPR; 7	YMC; FEA; 10	YMC; SPR; 8	16th	11

=== Complete World Series Formula V8 3.5 results ===
(key) (Races in bold indicate pole position) (Races in italics indicate fastest lap) (Small number denotes finishing position)

Year	Entrant	1	2	3	4	5	6	7	8	9	10	11	12	13	14	15	16	17	18	Pos	Points
2017	RP Motorsport	SIL; 1	SIL; 2	SPA; 1	SPA; 2	MNZ; 1	MNZ; 2	JER; 1	JER; 2	ALC; 1	ALC; 2	NÜR; 1	NÜR; 2	MEX; 1	MEX; 2	COA; 1	COA; 2	BHR; 1; 5	BHR; 2; 3	14th	25

=== Complete FIA Formula 2 Championship results ===
(key) (Races in bold indicate pole position) (Races in italics indicate points for the fastest lap of top ten finishers) (Small number denotes finishing position)

Year	Entrant	1	2	3	4	5	6	7	8	9	10	11	12	13	14	15	16	17	18	19	20	21	22	23	24	25	26	27	28	DC	Points
2019	BWT Arden	BHR; FEA; 13	BHR; SPR; 15	BAK; FEA; Ret	BAK; SPR; Ret	CAT; FEA; 13	CAT; SPR; 13	MON; FEA; 14	MON; SPR; Ret	LEC; FEA; 11	LEC; SPR; 19†	RBR; FEA; 17	RBR; SPR; 13	SIL; FEA; 14	SIL; SPR; 16	HUN; FEA; 16	HUN; SPR; Ret	SPA; FEA; C	SPA; SPR; C	MNZ; FEA; Ret	MNZ; SPR; 14	SOC; FEA; 15	SOC; SPR; 16	YMC; FEA; 16	YMC; SPR; 14					22nd	0
2022	Charouz Racing System	BHR; SPR	BHR; FEA	JED; SPR	JED; FEA	IMO; SPR	IMO; FEA	CAT; SPR	CAT; FEA	MCO; SPR	MCO; FEA	BAK; SPR	BAK; FEA	SIL; SPR	SIL; FEA	RBR; SPR	RBR; FEA	LEC; SPR	LEC; FEA	HUN; SPR	HUN; FEA	SPA; SPR; 19	SPA; FEA; 18	ZAN; SPR; Ret	ZAN; FEA; Ret	MNZ; SPR; Ret	MNZ; FEA; DNS	YMC; SPR; 20	YMC; FEA; 18	28th	0

^{†} Driver did not finish the race, but was classified as she completed over 90% of the race distance.

=== Complete F3 Asian Championship results ===
(key) (Races in bold indicate pole position; races in italics indicate fastest lap)

Year	Team	1	2	3	4	5	6	7	8	9	10	11	12	13	14	15	Pos	Points
2019–20	Seven GP	SEP1; 1 Ret	SEP1; 2; 4	SEP1; 3; 9	DUB; 1; 11	DUB; 2; 9	DUB; 3; 9	ABU; 1; 8	ABU; 2 Ret	ABU; 3; 10	SEP2; 1	SEP2; 2	SEP2; 3	CHA; 1	CHA; 2	CHA; 3	13th	31

=== Complete Porsche Supercup results ===
(key) (Races in bold indicate pole position) (Races in italics indicate fastest lap) (Small number denotes finishing position)

Year	Team	1	2	3	4	5	6	7	8	9	10	Pos.	Points	Ref
2019	Project 1/FACH	CAT	MON	RBR	SIL	HOC	HUN	SPA	MNZ	MEX; Ret	MEX; 25	NC†	0†	

^{†} As Calderón was a guest driver, she was ineligible for points.

=== Complete IMSA SportsCar Championship results ===
(key) (Races in bold indicate pole position; races in italics indicate fastest lap; small number denotes finishing position)

Year	Entrant	Class	Make	Engine	1	2	3	4	5	6	7	8	9	10	11	Rank	Points	Ref
2020	GEAR Racing powered by GRT Grasser	GTD	Lamborghini Huracán GT3 Evo	Lamborghini 5.2 L V10	DAY; 16	DAY	SEB	ELK	VIR	ATL	MOH	CLT	PET	LGA	SEB	57th	15	
2024	Gradient Racing	GTD	Acura NSX GT3 Evo22	Acura 3.5 L Turbo V6	DAY; 19	SEB; 17	LBH	LGA	WGL; 13	MOS	ELK	VIR	IMS; 16	PET; 12		41st	883	
2025	Gradient Racing	GTD	Ford Mustang GT3	Ford Coyote 5.4 L V8	DAY; 17	SEB; 13	LBH	LGA	WGL; 6	MOS	ELK	VIR	IMS	PET		40th	613	

=== Complete European Le Mans Series results ===
(key) (Races in bold indicate pole position; results in italics indicate fastest lap)

Year	Entrant	Class	Chassis	Engine	1	2	3	4	5	6	Rank	Points
2020	Richard Mille Racing Team	LMP2	Oreca 07	Gibson GK428 4.2 L V8	LEC; 5	SPA; 6	LEC	MNZ; 10	ALG; 11		11th	19.5
2023	Team Virage	LMP2 Pro-Am	Oreca 07	Gibson GK428 4.2 L V8	CAT; 9	LEC; NC	ARA; 6	SPA; 5	**ALG**; 9	ALG; 10	16th	24

=== Complete 24 Hours of Le Mans results ===
Year	Team	Co-Drivers	Car	Class	Laps	Pos.	Class Pos.
2020	(France) Richard Mille Racing Team	(Germany) Sophia Flörsch (Netherlands) Beitske Visser	Oreca 07-Gibson	LMP2	364	13th	9th
2021	(France) Richard Mille Racing Team	(Germany) Sophia Flörsch (Netherlands) Beitske Visser	Oreca 07-Gibson	LMP2	74	DNF	DNF

=== Complete Super Formula results ===
(key) (Races in bold indicate pole position) (Races in italics indicate fastest lap)

Year	Team	Engine	1	2	3	4	5	6	7	DC	Points
2020	Drago Corse with ThreeBond	Honda	MOT; 12	OKA	SUG	AUT; 16	SUZ; 13	SUZ; 12	FUJ; 17	23rd	0
2021	Drago Corse with ThreeBond	Honda	FUJ; 13	SUZ; 17	AUT	SUG	MOT	MOT; Ret	SUZ; 19	24th	0

=== Complete FIA World Endurance Championship results ===
(key) (Races in bold indicate pole position) (Races in italics indicate fastest lap)

Year	Entrant	Class	Chassis	Engine	1	2	3	4	5	6	Rank	Points
2021	Richard Mille Racing Team	LMP2	Oreca 07	Gibson GK428 4.2 L V8	SPA; 8	ALG; 6	MNZ; 8	LMS; Ret	BHR	BHR; 9	17th	23

=== Complete Stock Car Pro Series results ===
Year	Team	Car	1	2	3	4	5	6	7	8	9	10	11	12	13	14	15	16	17	18	19	20	21	22	23	24	Rank	Points
2026	SG28 by RTR	Toyota Corolla Cross	CRS; 1 WD	CRS; 2 WD	CAS; 1	CAS; 2	INT; 1	INT; 2	GOI; 1	GOI; 2	CUI; 1	CUI; 2	VCA; 1	VCA; 2	SCZ; 1	SCZ; 2	CRS; 1	CRS; 2	BRA; 1	BRA; 2	CAS; 1	CAS; 2	VEL; 1	VEL; 2	INT; 1	INT; 2	36th*	0*

^{*} Season still in progress.
