= Canal F1 Latin America =

Subscription television channel

Canal F1 Latin America was a subscription television channel which was dedicated to the broadcasting of motor racing to the Caribbean as well as Central and Latin America (apart from Brazil). It was launched on 1 March 2015 and ceased transmission in most of its market on 1 January 2018 before being shut down in Chile the following month. The channel broadcast Formula One, the GP2 Series, the FIA Formula 2 Championship, the GP3 Series, the Porsche Supercup and the TCR International Series.

== History ==
Mediapro acquired exclusive rights to broadcast Formula One (F1) motor racing live in the Caribbean as well as Central and Latin America (except for Brazil) from 2015 to 2019 in March 2014. It launched the Canal F1 Latin America channel on 1 March 2015 during the pre-season test session at the Circuit de Barcelona-Catalunya race circuit and the channel would broadcast motor racing on the channel 24 hours a day, seven days a week all-year round. Agreements were reached to carry the channel as well as several interactive channels in both standard and high definition forms in the countries of Argentina, Chile, Colombia, Ecuador, Peru, Uruguay and Venezuela on the pay television satellite platform DirecTV; the same terms were reached with Sky México in Costa Rica, and with IPTV operator TotalPlay in Mexico. The channel won the Formula One Television Trophy that same year.

For the 2016 Formula One World Championship, Canal F1 Latin America sponsored the Force India team. Mediapro reached an agreement with the Argentine cable television operator Supercanal to carry the channel in the provinces of Catamarca, Chubut, Córdoba, La Rioja, Mendoza, Neuquén, Río Negro, San Juan, San Luis, Santa Cruz, Santa Fe, Tierra del Fuego and Tucumán and also with the Argentine local cable television providers association Red Intercable. Another carriage agreement was signed with pay-TV platform Movistar TV to carry the channel on its platform in Chile, Colombia and Venezuela. The following year, Canal F1 Latin America continued to be carried on the Mexican pay-television operator Megacable after a new carriage agreement was reached by it and Mediapro. This ensured that the channel could be broadcast to a total of 12 million Latin American households.

Whilst the channel attained record-high ratings on television, it considered whether it should continue broadcasting or cease transmission because it became increasingly expensive to operate. Canal F1 Latin America ceased broadcasting in Latin America on 1 January 2018 when the Fox Sports network acquired exclusive rights for the region; transmission ceased in Chile on 28 February 2018. The decision was influenced by F1's commercial rights being acquired by Liberty Media and it wanting a balance towards pay and free-to-air television as well as streaming platforms.

== Programmes ==
Canal F1 Latin America broadcast every practice session, qualifying session and races at each F1 Grand Prix, GP2 Series until 2016, the FIA Formula 2 Championship in 2017, the GP3 Series, the Porsche Supercup and the TCR International Series motor racing championships. Previews, the post-race press conferences, post-race analysis and debate of each F1 Grand Prix were broadcast part of the channel's coverage of F1 and the programmes for this were called GP Confidential, El resumen de la Fórmula 1, Directo Fórmula, Planeta F1, Warm Up and From the Paddock. Canal F1 Latin America also broadcast the Sweet Stop and Formula G&L shows, which were both focused on presenting F1 in a light-hearted manner and on each hosting nation's eccentricities. It also featured the Legends Racing programme in which previous Grands Prix were broadcast.

== Personnel ==
Presenters and collaborators who had worked for the channel during its existence included Colombia's Tatiana Calderón, Diego Mejía, Juan Pablo Montoya, Christian Gonzalez, Christian Rouco, Enrique Scalabroni, Facu Regalia and Víctor Seara from Argentina, Mexico's Giselle Zarur, Álvaro Ademà, Albert Fábrega, Manuel Franco, Cristina Gullón, Carmen Jordá, Pedro de la Rosa, Raimon Durán and Nira Juanco of Spain as well as Jessika Fortunato and Rodolfo González from Venezuela. Liborio García was employed to be Canal F1 Latin America's editor.
