= João Victor Horto =

Brazilian racing driver

- Nationality: (Brazil) Brazilian
- Born: September 29, 1990 (age 36) Londrina

Firestone Indy Lights career
- Current team: Juncos Racing
- Car number: 86
- Starts: 3
- Wins: 0
- Poles: 0
- Fastest laps: 0
- Best finish: 15th in 2012

Previous series
- 2010-2011 2009: Star Mazda; Formula BMW Americas

João Victor "JV" Horto (born September 29, 1990) is a Brazilian racing driver from Londrina.

After karting, Horto went to the United States in 2009 to compete in the Formula BMW Americas championship where he finished seventh, scoring a best finish of second at Road America. In 2010, he drove in the Star Mazda series for Team Apex. He finished seventh in points with two second place finishes as well as two thirds. In 2011, he returned to the series, this time driving for Juncos Racing. He improved to fourth in the championship, winning the race at Mosport Park.

In 2012, Horto continued with Juncos Racing but moved up to the Firestone Indy Lights series, the next step in IndyCar's Mazda Road to Indy program. Horto competed in three of the first four races of the season, including the Freedom 100 before leaving the team and series. His best finish was seventh in both the Freedom 100 and at Barber Motorsports Park. He finished fifteenth in points.

== American open-wheel results ==
=== Star Mazda Championship ===
| Year | Team | 1 | 2 | 3 | 4 | 5 | 6 | 7 | 8 | 9 | 10 | 11 | 12 | 13 | Rank | Points |
|---|---|---|---|---|---|---|---|---|---|---|---|---|---|---|---|---|
| 2010 | Team Apex | SEB; 6 | STP; 2 | LAG; 17 | ORP; 3 | IOW; 3 | NJ1; 7 | NJ2; 2 | ACC; 10 | ACC; 24 | TRO; 6 | ROA; 19 | MOS; 12 | ATL; 8 | 7th | 381 |
| 2011 | Juncos Racing | STP; 14 | BAR; 4 | IND; 5 | MIL; 7 | IOW; 2 | MOS; 1 | TRO; 2 | TRO; 4 | SON; 6 | BAL; 3 | LAG; 6 | | | 4th | 375 |

=== Indy Lights ===
| Year | Team | 1 | 2 | 3 | 4 | 5 | 6 | 7 | 8 | 9 | 10 | 11 | 12 | Rank | Points | Ref |
|---|---|---|---|---|---|---|---|---|---|---|---|---|---|---|---|---|
| 2012 | Juncos Racing | STP; 13 | ALA; 7 | LBH | INDY; 7 | DET | MIL | IOW | TOR | EDM | TRO | BAL | FON | 15th | 69 | |
