= Giselle Zarur =

Mexican sports journalist

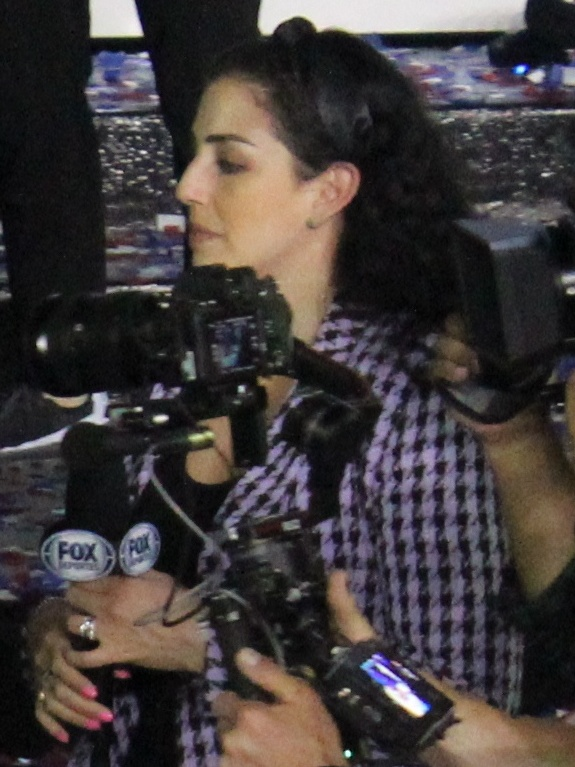
- Zarur at Daytona International Speedway in 2023
- Born: Giselle Zarur Maccise; 29 May 1987 (age 39); Mexico City, Mexico
- Occupations: Sports journalist; Television reporter
- Years active: 2010–present
- Employers: Televisa (2010–2018); Fox Deportes (2019–presenter)
- Spouse: Harold Rodriguez (m. 2019)

Giselle Zarur Maccise (born 29 May 1987) is a Mexican sports journalist and television reporter for Fox Deportes. She has also worked for the Televisa and Canal F1 Latin America television networks, and has covered a wide variety of sports throughout her career, such as Formula One and NASCAR motor racing, the Liga MX football league, tennis and Super Bowl LIV in Miami.

== Biography ==
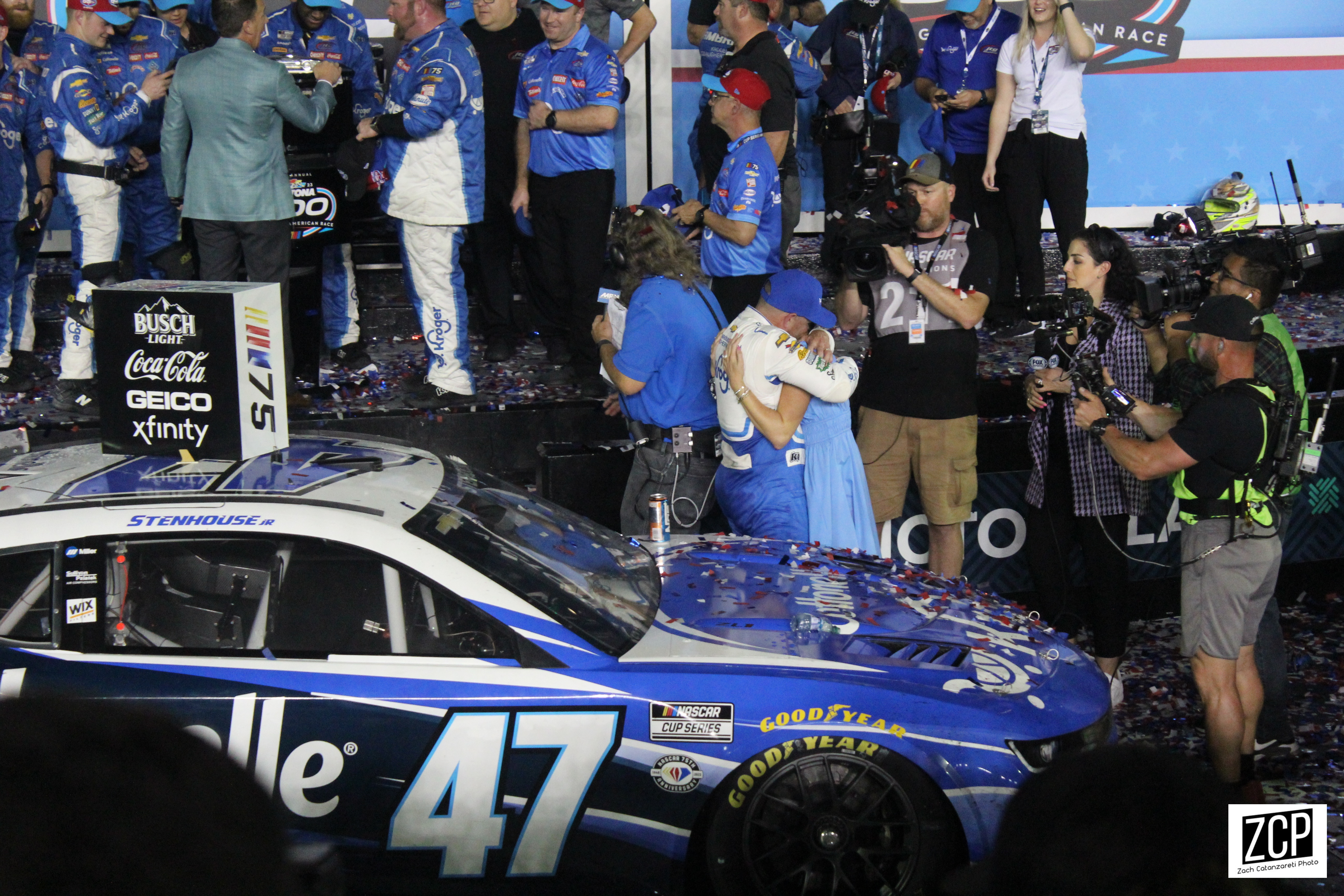
Zarur (holding the Fox microphone) waiting to interview Ricky Stenhouse Jr. after the 2023 Daytona 500

Zarur was born on 29 May 1987, in Mexico City, Mexico. She is of Lebanese descent through her parents and grandparents, and is a graduate of the Centro de Estudios en Ciencias de la Comunicación. Zarur began her broadcasting career with mass media company Televisa in 2010, and covered a wide variety of sports such as Formula One motor racing, the Liga MX football league and tennis; Formula One is where she garnered the most recognition for her expertise in the series and reported on the whole season. She also reported on Formula One for Canal F1 Latin America, the network's official Latin American broadcast station. Zarur's work in Mexican football saw her report on major league finals and matches in the country, such as the El Súper Clásico rivalry between the América and Guadalajara clubs.

She did her final broadcast of Formula One for Canal F1 Latin America at the 2017 Abu Dhabi Grand Prix. In late October 2018, Zarur left Televisa, and subsequently moved to the city of Los Angeles to take up employment with the Spanish-language Fox Deportes network in the United States. She denied media reports Televisa sacked her following the mass media company's decision to dismiss some of its commentators and presenters in April 2019. Zarur had felt her career at Televisa was over, and she began working for Fox Deportes in July 2019. She presents Fox Deportes' weekly broadcast of Liga MX from Mexico and covered Super Bowl LIV in Miami.

In 2022, Zarur became the first Latina to be a broadcaster for the Daytona 500 when she was a pit reporter for the race for Fox Deportes.

== Personal life ==
Zarur became engaged to Harold Rodríguez in October 2018, and married him at a ceremony in San Fernando, California on 19 October 2019. She is a fan of Club América football club.
