= 2010 Star Mazda Championship =

Season of open wheel auto racing series

Seasons
- ← 2009 2011 →

The 2010 Star Mazda Championship was the twelfth season of the Star Mazda Championship, an open wheel auto racing series that competes using spec chassis and engines. It was the third season under the sanctioning of the International Motor Sports Association and the first under the Indy Racing League's new Road to Indy ladder.

Conor Daly became series champion after finishing in the top four positions in each of the twelve races prior to clinching the title at Mosport International Raceway. At the same meeting, Carlos Conde sealed the Masters title for drivers over 45 years of age, while J. W. Roberts secured the Expert title for drivers between 30 and 44 at Trois-Rivières.

== Drivers and teams ==
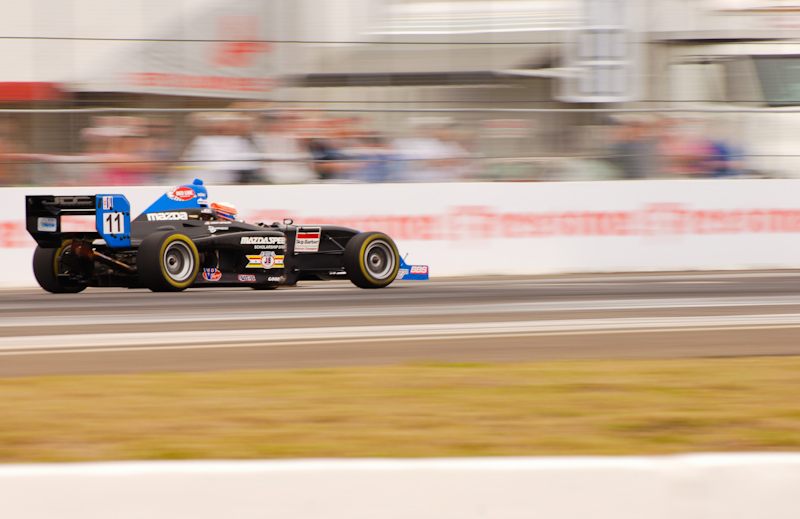
Connor De Phillippi finished 3rd at the championship

Team	No	Drivers	Notes
(United States) Team Apex	9	(Venezuela) Jorge Goncalvez	
(United States) Team Apex	18	(Brazil) João Victor Horto	
(United States) Team Apex	28	(Colombia) Juan Piedrahita	Skipped ORP & Iowa
(United States) Team Apex	28	(United States) Bob Kaminsky	Masters; Autobahn only
(United States) JDC MotorSports	11	(United States) Connor De Phillippi	
(United States) JDC MotorSports	19	(Brazil) Caio Lara	
(United States) JDC MotorSports	55	(United States) Gerry Kraut	Masters; Sebring, Laguna Seca and Autobahn
(United States) JDC MotorSports	64	(United States) Patrick O'Neill	Expert; Skipped ORP, Iowa, Autobahn, Mosport & Road Atlanta
(United States) JDC MotorSports	75	(United States) Jeff Garibotti	Autobahn only
(United States) JDC MotorSports	78	(Russia) Mikhail Goikhberg	Mosport only
(United States) JDC MotorSports	85	(United States) Chris Miller	
(Canada) AIM Autosport	13	(Canada) Michael Furfari	Sebring & St. Pete only
(Canada) AIM Autosport	16	(Canada) David Ostella	Skipped Road Atlanta
(Canada) AIM Autosport	23	(United States) Walt Bowlin	Masters; New Jersey onwards
(Canada) AIM Autosport	29	(United States) Phil Fogg, Jr.	Laguna Seca only
(Canada) AIM Autosport	44	(Canada) Zack Meyer	Mosport only
(Canada) AIM Autosport	72	(United States) Larry Pegram	Expert; New Jersey and Road Atlanta
(United States) World Speed Motorsports	15	(United States) Frank McCormick	Laguna Seca only
(United States) Andersen Racing	17	(Canada) Mikaël Grenier	Skipped Road Atlanta
(United States) Andersen Racing	27	(United States) Court Vernon	Sebring & St. Pete only
(United States) Andersen Racing	37	(United States) Dom Bastien	Masters; Sebring, New Jersey, Road America and Road Atlanta
(United States) Andersen Racing	38	(France) Tristan Vautier	
(United States) Andersen Racing	47	(Norway) Anders Krohn	
(United States) Andersen Racing	81	(United States) Nick Andries	St. Pete, Iowa onwards
(Venezuela) Linares Racing	20	(Venezuela) Carlos Linares	
(Venezuela) Linares Racing	21	(Chile) Kevin Toledo	Autobahn and Trois-Rivières
(United States) Juncos Racing	22	(United States) Conor Daly	
(United States) Juncos Racing	25	(Colombia) Tatiana Calderón	
(United States) Juncos Racing	60	(Chile) Martin Scuncio	Road Atlanta only
(United States) Juncos Racing	61	(United States) Sean Burstyn	Autobahn only
(United States) Juncos Racing	66	(United States) Rusty Mitchell	Mitchell merged entry to Juncos Racing from Iowa onwards
(United States) Juncos Racing	94	(United States) Hayden Duerson	Sebring & St. Pete only
(United States) Team GDT	24	(United States) Ian Harms	Sebring only
(United States) Team GDT	31	(Puerto Rico) Carlos Conde	Masters; Skipped Laguna Seca, ORP, Iowa & Road Atlanta
(United States) Team GDT	33	(United Kingdom) Richard Kent	Sebring & St. Pete only
(United States) Team GDT	51	(United States) Alex Ardoin	Trois-Rivières only
(United States) Team GDT	65	(United States) J. W. Roberts	Expert; Skipped ORP and Mosport
(United States) Team GDT	91	(United States) Ashley Freiberg	Autobahn only
(United States) Mitchell Motorsports	66	(United States) Rusty Mitchell	Merged to Juncos Racing after ORP

== Race calendar and results ==
The calendar was announced on November 23, 2009. The new partnership with the IRL begins with three weekends shared with the IndyCar Series and Indy Lights including a race at O'Reilly Raceway Park at Indianapolis the night before the Indianapolis 500. Star Mazda will also support the two series in St. Petersburg and at Iowa Speedway. Five races will support the American Le Mans Series, and will also join the Continental Tire Sports Car Challenge at Trois-Rivières.

Round	Circuit	Location	Date	Pole position	Fastest lap	Winning driver	Winning team	Supporting
1	Sebring International Raceway	Sebring, Florida	March 19	(Norway) Anders Krohn	(Norway) Anders Krohn	(France) Tristan Vautier	(United States) Andersen Racing	American Le Mans Series
2	Streets of St. Petersburg	St. Petersburg, Florida	March 28	(United States) Conor Daly	(United States) Conor Daly	(United States) Conor Daly	(United States) Juncos Racing	IndyCar Series
3	Mazda Raceway Laguna Seca	Monterey, California	May 23	(United States) Conor Daly	(United States) Connor De Phillippi	(United States) Conor Daly	(United States) Juncos Racing	American Le Mans Series
4	O'Reilly Raceway Park	Clermont, Indiana	May 29	(Canada) Mikaël Grenier	(United States) Conor Daly	(United States) Conor Daly	(United States) Juncos Racing	USAC National Midget Series
5	Iowa Speedway	Newton, Iowa	June 19	(United States) Conor Daly	(United States) Conor Daly	(United States) Conor Daly	(United States) Juncos Racing	IndyCar Series
6	New Jersey Motorsports Park	Millville, New Jersey	June 26	(United States) Conor Daly	(United States) Conor Daly	(Brazil) Caio Lara	(United States) JDC MotorSports	stand-alone
7	New Jersey Motorsports Park	Millville, New Jersey	June 27	(United States) Conor Daly	(Brazil) João Victor Horto	(France) Tristan Vautier	(United States) Andersen Racing	stand-alone
8	Autobahn Country Club	Joliet, Illinois	July 31	(Canada) Mikaël Grenier	(United States) Conor Daly	(Canada) Mikaël Grenier	(United States) Andersen Racing	stand-alone
9	Autobahn Country Club	Joliet, Illinois	August 1	(United States) Conor Daly	(United States) Conor Daly	(United States) Conor Daly	(United States) Juncos Racing	stand-alone
10	Circuit Trois-Rivières	Trois-Rivières, Québec	August 15	(United States) Conor Daly	(United States) Alex Ardoin	(United States) Alex Ardoin	(United States) Team GDT	Continental Tire Sports Car Challenge
11	Road America	Elkhart Lake, Wisconsin	August 21	(United States) Conor Daly	(United States) Conor Daly	(United States) Conor Daly	(United States) Juncos Racing	American Le Mans Series
12	Mosport International Raceway	Bowmanville, Ontario	August 28	(United States) Conor Daly	(United States) Connor De Phillippi	(United States) Conor Daly	(United States) Juncos Racing	American Le Mans Series
13	Road Atlanta	Braselton, Georgia	October 1	(United States) Connor De Phillippi	(United States) Connor De Phillippi	(United States) Connor De Phillippi	(United States) JDC MotorSports	American Le Mans Series

== Championship standings ==
=== Drivers' ===
Pos	Driver	SEB (United States)	STP (United States)	LAG (United States)	ORP (United States)	IOW (United States)	NJ (United States)		ACC (United States)		TRO (Canada)	ROA (United States)	MOS (Canada)	ATL (United States)	Points
Overall
1	(United States) Conor Daly	3	**1**	**1**	1	**1**	**3**	**4**	3	**1**	**3**	**1**	**1**	3	539
2	(Norway) Anders Krohn	**5**	4	2	5	5	2	3	6	3	4	4	5	2	460
3	(United States) Connor De Phillippi	7	5	4	7	4	4	8	13	5	17	3	3	**1**	417
4	(Venezuela) Jorge Goncalvez	2	17	11	10	2	9	5	21	7	2	2	2	9	409
5	(France) Tristan Vautier	1	9	15	6	8	6	1	23	2	11	13	4	5	400
6	(Brazil) Caio Lara	10	3	6	9	7	1	6	2	9	7		7	6	382
7	(Brazil) João Victor Horto	6	2	17	3	3	7	2	10	24	6	19	12	8	381
8	(Canada) Mikaël Grenier	4	6	3	**2**	15	5	21	**1**	4	10	16	6		366
9	(United States) Rusty Mitchell	11	10	8	4	10	20	10	13	6	8	5	9	12	350
10	(Colombia) Tatiana Calderón	20	19	9	11	12	11	9	7	11	9	8	16	11	320
11	(United States) Chris Miller	9	15	7	13	13	8	14	22	13	14	17	8	10	313
12	(Canada) David Ostella	13	7	18	8	14	22	7	4	23	5	7	10		306
13	(Venezuela) Carlos Linares	14	22		12	11	16	11	12	12	16	12	13	14	275
14	(United States) J. W. Roberts	17	16	13		9	14	17	16	20	13	11		15	248
15	(United States) Nick Andries					6	12	12	9	10	18	14	11	7	231
16	(Colombia) Juan Piedrahita	19	11	5			10	13				6	15	13	199
17	(Puerto Rico) Carlos Conde	16	18				15	18	17	16	15	9	18		192
18	(United States) Gerry Kraut	12		8			13	20	19	18		18	17		170
19	(United States) Dom Bastien	15					18	19	18	21		15		16	140
20	(United States) Walt Bowlin						19	22	20	22	19			18	108
21	(United States) Patrick O'Neill		14	16			21	15							80
22	(United States) Court Vernon	21	13									10			64
23	(United States) Larry Pegram						17	16						17	59
24	(Canada) Michael Furfari	8	12												52
25	(United Kingdom) Richard Kent	23	8												42
26	(United States) Hayden Duerson	18	20												34
unregistered drivers
	(United States) Alex Ardoin										1				0
	(Chile) Martin Scuncio													4	0
	(United States) Ashley Freiberg								5	19					0
	(Chile) Kevin Toledo								8	8	12				0
	(United States) Bob Kaminsky								11	14					0
	(United States) Frank McCormick			12											0
	(United States) Phil Fogg			14											0
	(Canada) Zack Meyer												14		0
	(United States) Jeff Garibotty								15	17					0
	(United States) Sean Burstyn									15					0
	(Russia) Mikhail Goikhberg												19		0
	(United States) Nick Andries		21												0
	(United States) Ian Harms	22													0
Expert (best ten results)
1	(United States) J. W. Roberts	17	16	13		9	14	17	16	20	13	11		15	196
2	(United States) Patrick O'Neill		14	16			21	15							70
3	(United States) Larry Pegram						17	16						17	48
Masters (best ten results)
1	(Puerto Rico) Carlos Conde	16	18				15	18	17	16	15	9	18		166
2	(United States) Gerry Kraut	12		10			13	20	19	18		18	17		138
3	(United States) Dom Bastien	15					18	19	18	21		15		16	112
4	(United States) Walt Bowlin						19	22	20	22	19			18	80
Pos	Driver	SEB (United States)	STP (United States)	LAG (United States)	ORP (United States)	IOW (United States)	NJ (United States)		ACC (United States)		TRO (Canada)	ROA (United States)	MOS (Canada)	ATL (United States)	Points

Color	Result
Gold	Winner
Silver	2nd place
Bronze	3rd place
Green	4th & 5th place
Light Blue	6th–10th place
Dark Blue	Finished (Outside Top 10)
Purple	Did not finish
Red	Did not qualify (DNQ)
Brown	Withdrawn (Wth)
Black	Disqualified (DSQ)
White	Did not start (DNS)
Blank	Did not participate (DNP)
Blank	Not competing

**In-line notation**
**Bold**	Pole position (1 point)
Italics	Ran fastest race lap

=== Teams' ===
Pos	Team	SEB (United States)	STP (United States)	LAG (United States)	ORP (United States)	IOW (United States)	NJ (United States)		ACC (United States)		TRO (Canada)	ROA (United States)	MOS (Canada)	ATL (United States)	Points
1	(United States) Andersen Racing	1	4	2	2	5	2	1	1	2	4	4	4	2	339
1	(United States) Andersen Racing	4	6	3	5	6	5	3	6	3	10	13	5	5	339
2	(United States) Juncos Racing	3	1	1	1	1	3	4	3	1	3	1	1	3	324
2	(United States) Juncos Racing	18	19	9	11	10	8	9	7	6	8	5	9	4	324
3	(United States) Team Apex	2	2	5	3	2	6	2	10	7	2	2	2	8	285
3	(United States) Team Apex	6	11	11	10	3	7	5	11	14	6	6	12	9	285
4	(United States) JDC MotorSports	7	3	4	7	4	1	6	2	5	7	3	3	1	279
4	(United States) JDC MotorSports	9	5	6	9	7	4	8	11	9	14	17	7	6	279
5	(Canada) AIM Autosport	8	7	14	8	14	17	7	4	14	5	7	10	17	149
5	(Canada) AIM Autosport	13	12	18			19	17	20	24	19		14	18	149
6	(United States) Team GDT	17	8	13		9	14	17	5	16	1	9	18	15	144
6	(United States) Team GDT	23	16				15	18	16	19	13	11			144
7	(Venezuela) Linares Racing	14	22		12	11	16	11	8	8	12	12	13	14	131
7	(Venezuela) Linares Racing								12	12	16				131
8	(United States) Mitchell Motorsports	11	10	8	4										55
9	(United States) World Speed Motorsports			12											11
Pos	Team	SEB (United States)	STP (United States)	LAG (United States)	ORP (United States)	IOW (United States)	NJ (United States)		ACC (United States)		TRO (Canada)	ROA (United States)	MOS (Canada)	ATL (United States)	Points
