= Nick Andries =

American open-wheel racing driver (born 1990)

Nicholas Andries
- Nationality: (United States) American
- Born: November 19, 1990 (age 35) Pinellas Park, Florida, U.S.

Pro Mazda Championship career
- Current team: JDC Motorsports
- Years active: 2010-2011, 2013
- Car number: 19
- Starts: 22
- Wins: 0
- Poles: 1
- Best finish: 3rd in 2011

Previous series
- 2012: Indy Lights

Nicholas Andries (born November 19, 1990) is an American open-wheel racing driver from Pinellas Park, Florida.

== Career ==
After karting from the age of five in 1995 to 2008, Andries competed in the Skip Barber Scholarship Shootout in 2008 winning one of three top prizes. Funded on the scholarship in 2009, Andries dominated the Skip Barber Summer Series with eleven wins and fourteen podiums in 14 races, winning the Championship and Rookie of the Year. Andries moved to the Skip Barber National Championship in 2010, finishing sixth with one win and three other podium finishes. He also participated in nine of the thirteen rounds of the Star Mazda Championship for Andersen Racing with a best finish of sixth at the Iowa Speedway and good enough for fifteenth in the championship.

In 2011, Andries competed in the full Star Mazda season for Team Pelfrey. He failed to win, but finished on the podium a series high seven times, including four runner-up finishes. He finished third in points.

Andries made his Firestone Indy Lights debut for Bryan Herta Autosport in Long Beach.

For 2013, Andres returned to the renamed Pro Mazda Series, driving for JDC MotorSports.

== Motorsports career results ==
=== American open–wheel racing results ===
(key)

==== Pro Mazda Championship ====
Year	Team	No.	1	2	3	4	5	6	7	8	9	10	11	12	13	14	15	16	Rank	Points
2010	Andersen Racing	81	SEB	STP	LAG	IRP	IOW; 6	NJ1; 12	NJ2; 12	ACC; 9	ACC; 10	TRO; 18	ROA; 14	MOS; 11	ATL; 7				15th	231
2011	Team Pelfrey	81	STP; 17	ALA; 2	IRP; 2	MIL; 3	IOW; 7	MOS; 4	TRO; 3	TRO; 2	SNM; 3	BAL; 9	LAG; 2						3rd	385
2013	JDC MotorSports	19	AUS; 15	AUS; 8	STP; 12	STP; 5	IRP	MIL	TOR	TOR	MOS	MOS	MOH	MOH	TRO	TRO	HOU	HOU	14th	40

==== Indy Lights ====
Year	Team	No.	1	2	3	4	5	6	7	8	9	10	11	12	Rank	Points
2012	Bryan Herta Autosport	28	STP	ALA	LBH; 13	INDY	DET	MIL	IOW	TOR	EDM	TRO	BAL	FON	26th	17

^{*} Season still in progress
