= Connor De Phillippi =

American racing driver (born 1992)

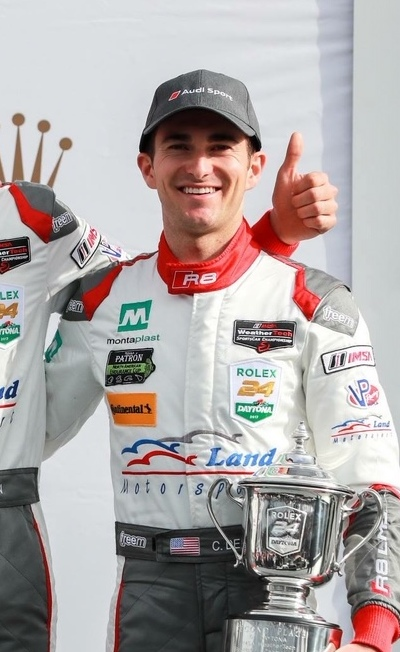
- De Phillippi at the 2017 24 Hours of Daytona.
- Nationality: American
- Born: Connor Steven De Phillippi; December 25, 1992 (age 33) San Clemente, California, U.S.

IMSA WeatherTech SportsCar Championship career
- Debut season: 2014
- Current team: Paul Miller Racing
- Categorisation: FIA Gold (2014–2015, 2018–); FIA Silver (2016–2017)
- Car number: 25

Previous series
- 2016-2017 2013-2015 2013 2010-2012 2010 2009 2008: ADAC GT Masters; Porsche Carrera Cup Germany; VLN Series; Star Mazda Championship; Legends Silver State Championship; Skip Barber National Championship; Skip Barber West Coast Series

Championship titles
- 2008 2009 2009 2016 2025 2026: Skip Barber West Coast Series; Skip Barber National Championship; Legends Silver State Championship; ADAC GT Masters; GT World Challenge America - Pro; IMSA SportsCar Championship - GTD Pro

Awards
- 2008 2009 2009 2010 2013 2013: Skip Barber Shoot-Out Winner; Team USA Scholarship Winner; Walter Hayes Trophy Award; Star Mazda Rookie of the Year; Porsche Junioren Recipient; Porsche Carrera Cup Germany Rookie of the Year

Connor Steven De Phillippi (born December 25, 1992) is an American professional racing driver and gold rated BMW Motorsport works driver.

== Racing career ==
=== Early career ===
De Phillippi began karting at the age of five and had won 21 national titles by the age of 14, including four SKUSA SuperNationals titles. In 2007, he was selected as a member of Team USA for the Brazilian Granja Viana 500-mile kart race. The field included Rubens Barrichello, Felipe Massa, Tony Kanaan and Nelson Piquet Jr., among other drivers. Team USA reached second place during De Phillippi's stint before an incident involving lapped traffic later in the race ended the team's chances of a podium finish.

=== 2008–2009 Skip Barber ===
In 2008, De Phillippi moved from karting to open-wheel racing and won the Skip Barber West Coast Series championship and Rookie of the Year award. He also participated in the Skip Barber National Series Racing Shoot-out and received a full-season entry in the Skip Barber National Championship as part of the MAZDASPEED driver development program. He finished sixth in the national series and received the Rising Star Award from eFormulaCarNews.com and its readers.

=== Skip Barber National Championship and Team USA Scholarship ===
In 2009, De Phillippi won the Skip Barber National Championship with seven victories in 14 races. The championship earned him a place in the 2010 Star Mazda Championship as part of the Mazda Road to Indy program. After receiving the Team USA Scholarship, he competed in the Formula Ford Festival at Silverstone Circuit and won the Walter Hayes Trophy, becoming its youngest winner and the second American to win the event. He also won the 2009 Silver State Championship in the U.S. Legends Series.

=== Star Mazda Championship Series ===
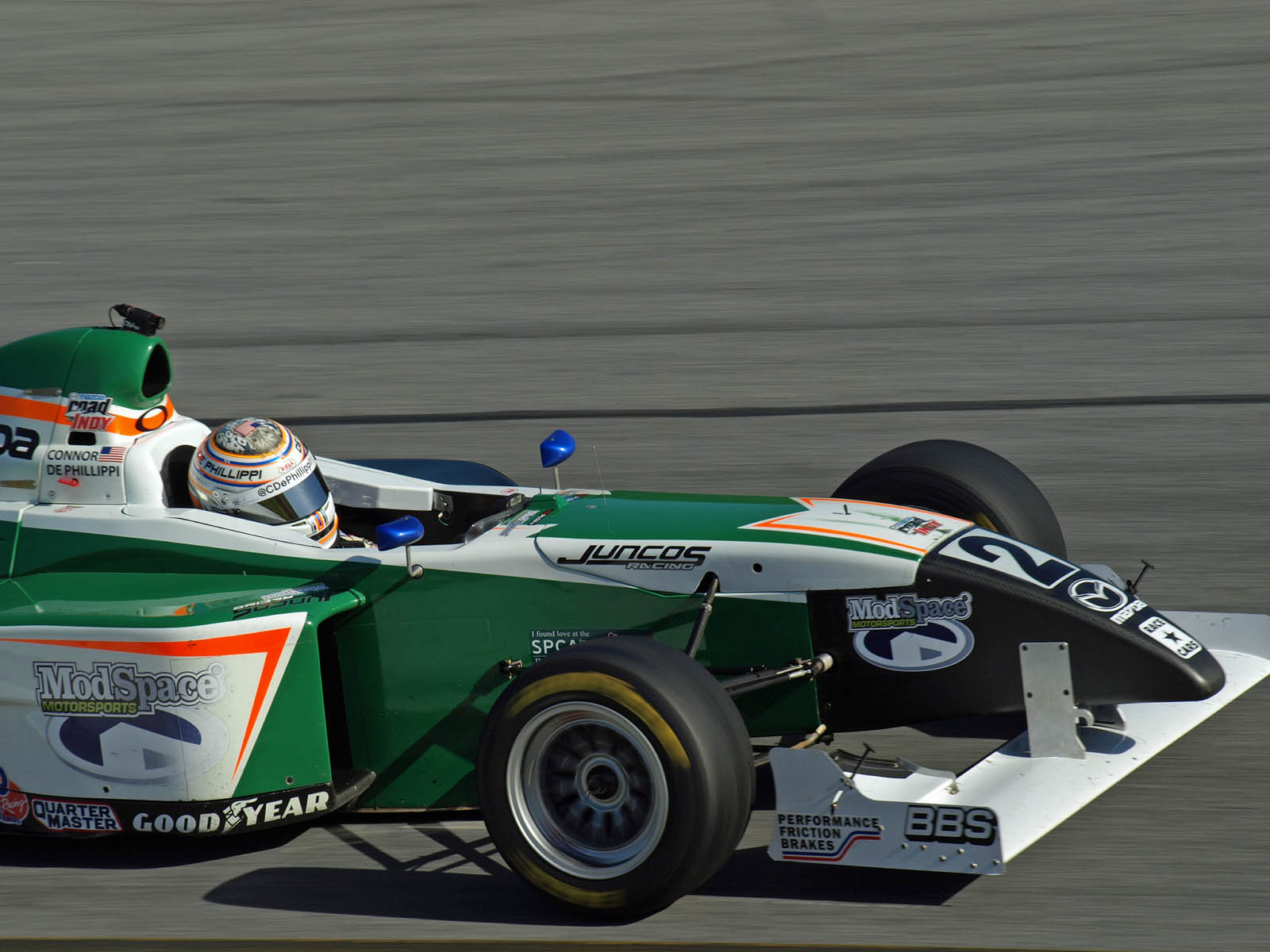
De Phillippi in the 2012 Star Mazda race at Road Atlanta

In 2010, De Phillippi competed in the Star Mazda Championship for JDC MotorSports, finishing third in points. He won the final race of the season at Road America and received Rookie of the Year honors.

In 2011, De Phillippi returned to the Star Mazda Championship with Team Pelfrey. He won the season-opening race at the Honda Grand Prix of St. Petersburg. He also won the Night Before the 500 at Lucas Oil Raceway at Indianapolis, setting a track record of 19.999 seconds, starting from pole position and leading all 85 laps. De Phillippi won two additional races at Circuit Trois-Rivières and Mazda Raceway Laguna Seca. He finished second in the championship behind Tristan Vautier with four victories, while Team Pelfrey won the series team championship.

De Phillippi planned to move to the Indy Lights series, but the proposed deal did not materialize. He instead returned to the Star Mazda Championship with Juncos Racing and won the opening race at St. Petersburg. During round five, he took pole position for the Night Before the 500, led every lap and recorded the fastest lap of the race. He finished fourth in the championship, losing the tie-breaker for third to Sage Karam, who recorded three victories to De Phillippi's two.

=== Porsche Junior factory driver ===
On November 27, 2012, De Phillippi was announced as a Porsche Junioren factory driver for the 2013 Porsche Carrera Cup Germany.

De Phillippi was the second American to receive Porsche AG funding, after Patrick Long.

=== 2013 ===
For the 2013 season, De Phillippi joined FÖRCH Racing by Lukas Motorsport and competed in the Porsche Carrera Cup Germany.

The season was De Phillippi's first competing in a closed-cockpit car. He finished every race before retiring from the final round at the Hockenheimring and was named the 2013 Porsche Carrera Cup Germany Rookie of the Year.

De Phillippi also competed with Manthey Racing in two rounds of the VLN at the Nürburgring Nordschleife.

=== 2014 ===
In January 2014, De Phillippi competed in the Dubai 24 Hour with FACH Auto Tech, sharing a Porsche 997 GT3 R with Sebastian Asch, Martin Ragginger and Otto Klohs. A mechanical failure required repairs during the race, and the team finished tenth in class.

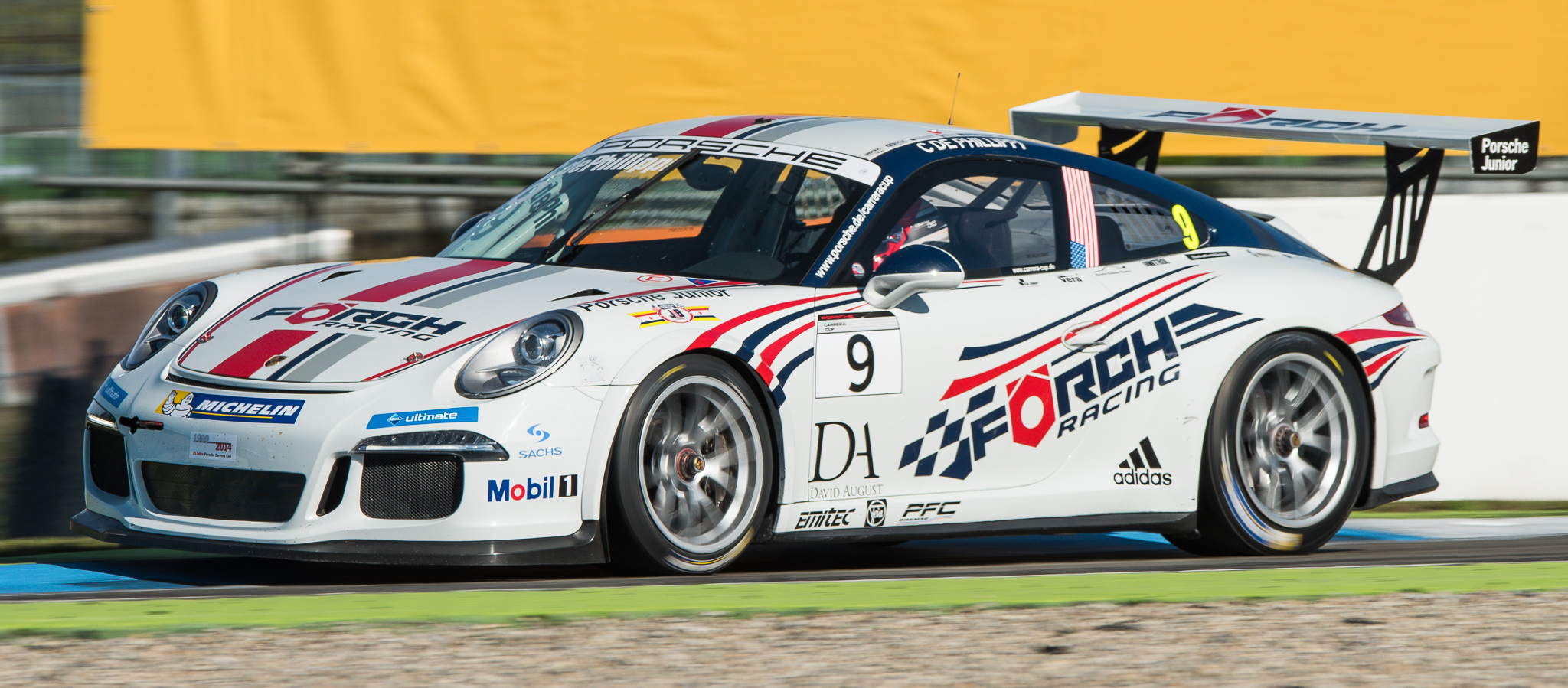
De Phillippi in Porsche Carrera Cup - Hockenheimring 2014

Later that month, De Phillippi made his debut in the Rolex 24 at Daytona, the opening event of the inaugural Tudor United SportsCar Championship. He shared the No. 73 Park Place Motorsports Porsche GT3 America with Patrick Lindsey, Kevin Estre, Jason Hart and Mike Vess. The team completed 645 laps and finished 13th in class.

=== 2021 ===
During the 2021 Mobil 1 Sebring 12 Hours, De Phillippi made contact with the class-leading Corvette Racing C8.R with less than ten minutes remaining. IMSA assessed him a drive-through penalty for avoidable contact.

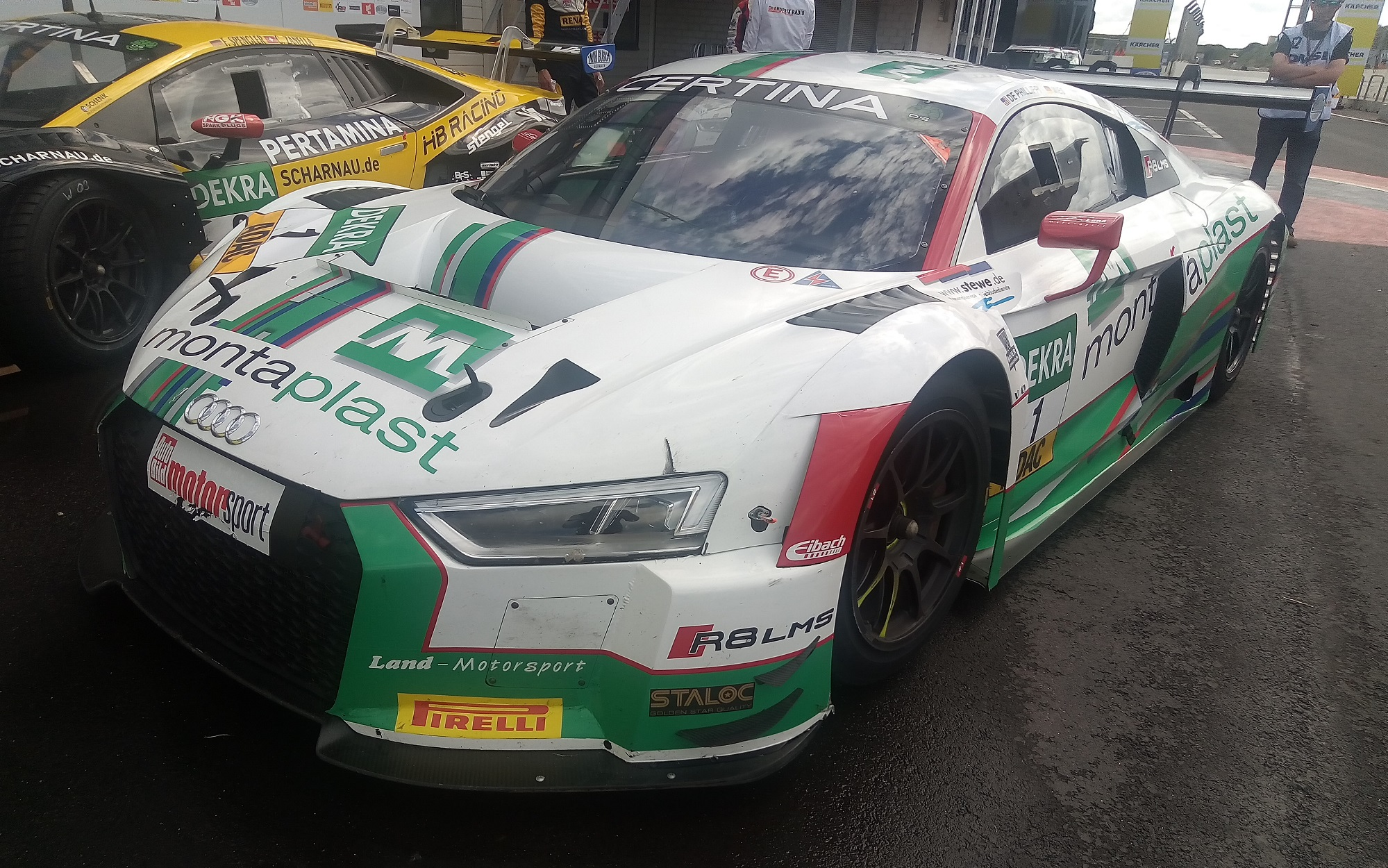
Land Motorsport Audi R8 shared by Connor De Phillippi and Christopher Mies.

== Racing record ==
=== Racing career summary ===
Season	Series	Team	Races	Wins	Poles	F/Laps	Podiums	Points	Position
2010	Star Mazda Championship	JDC MotorSports	13	1	1	3	3	417	**3rd**
2011	Star Mazda Championship	Team Pelfrey	11	4	2	3	6	401	**2nd**
2012	Star Mazda Championship	Juncos Racing	17	2	2	1	10	325	4th
2013	Porsche Carrera Cup Germany	FÖRCH Racing by Lukas Motorsport	17	0	0	0	0	116	9th
2014	United SportsCar Championship - GTD	Park Place Motorsports	1	0	0	0	0	1	131st
2014	Porsche Supercup	FÖRCH Racing by Lukas Motorsport	8	0	0	0	0	54	11th
2014	Porsche Carrera Cup Germany	FÖRCH Racing by Lukas Motorsport	18	1	2	0	3	121	8th
2015	United SportsCar Championship - GTD	Mühlner Motorsports America	1	0	0	0	0	1	60th
2015	Porsche Supercup	VERVA Lechner Racing Team	10	0	1	0	0	53	12th
2015	Porsche Carrera Cup Germany	Land Motorsport	18	0	0	0	1	124	10th
2016	IMSA SportsCar Championship - GTD	Stevenson Motorsports	1	0	0	0	0	1	65th
2016	ADAC GT Masters	Montaplast by Land-Motorsport	16	1	3	1	7	168	**1st**
2016	24 Hours of Nürburgring - SP9	Montaplast by Land-Motorsport	1	0	0	0	0	N/A	DNF
2016	24H Series - A6	Land-Motorsport GmbH	1						
2016	Blancpain GT Series Endurance Cup	Belgian Audi Club WRT	1	0	0	0	0	0	NC
2017	IMSA SportsCar Championship - GTD	Montaplast by Land-Motorsport	3	1	0	0	2	96	28th
2017	ADAC GT Masters	Montaplast by Land-Motorsport	14	1	0	0	4	120	**3rd**
2017	Blancpain GT Series Endurance Cup	Audi Sport Team WRT	1	0	0	0	0	16	20th
2017	24 Hours of Nürburgring - SP9	Audi Sport Team Land	1	1	0	0	1	N/A	**1st**
2018	IMSA SportsCar Championship - GTLM	BMW Team RLL	11	2	1	0	4	304	6th
2018	Blancpain GT Series Endurance Cup	ROWE Racing	1	0	0	0	0	0	NC
2018	24 Hours of Nürburgring - SP9	ROWE Racing	1	0	0	0	0	N/A	DNF
2019	IMSA SportsCar Championship - GTLM	BMW Team RLL	11	1	0	0	2	293	6th
2019	24 Hours of Nürburgring - SP9	ROWE Racing	1	0	0	0	0	N/A	DNF
2020	IMSA SportsCar Championship - GTLM	BMW Team RLL	11	1	0	0	4	313	4th
2021	IMSA SportsCar Championship - GTLM	BMW Team RLL	4	0	0	0	2	1251	7th
2021	24 Hours of Nürburgring - SP9	ROWE Racing	1	0	0	0	1	N/A	**2nd**
2021	Le Mans Cup - LMP3	Phoenix Racing	2	0	0	0	0	0	NC
2022	IMSA SportsCar Championship - GTD Pro	BMW Team RLL	10	0	1	0	2	2872	6th
2022	24 Hours of Nürburgring - SP9	ROWE Racing	1	0	0	0	0	N/A	DNF
2023	IMSA SportsCar Championship - GTP	BMW Team RLL	9	1	0	1	5	2687	6th
2023	24 Hours of Nürburgring - SP9	ROWE Racing	1	0	0	0	0	N/A	DNF
2024	IMSA SportsCar Championship - GTP	BMW Team RLL	9	0	0	0	1	2392	8th
2024	GT World Challenge Europe Endurance Cup	Century Motorsport	1	0	0	0	0	0	NC
2024	GT World Challenge America - Pro	Random Vandals Racing	1	0	0	0	0	0	NC
2025	IMSA SportsCar Championship - GTD Pro	Paul Miller Racing	5	0	0	0	1	1389	15th
2025	GT World Challenge America - Pro	Random Vandals Racing	13	6	7	6	11	283.5	**1st**
2025	GT World Challenge Europe Endurance Cup	BMW Italia Ceccato Racing	1	0	0	0	0	0	NC
2025	IMSA SportsCar Championship - LMP2	Inter Europol Competition	1	0	0	0	1	341	44th
2026	IMSA SportsCar Championship - GTD Pro	Paul Miller Racing	10	1	2	1	4	3012	**1st**
2026	Nürburgring Langstrecken-Serie - SP-X	Schubert Motorsport							
2026	24 Hours of Nürburgring - SP-X	Schubert Motorsport	1	1	1	1	1	N/A	**1st**
2026	GT World Challenge America - Pro	Turner Motorsport	1	1	1	0	1	0	NC†

^{*} Season still in progress.

=== American open-wheel racing results ===
(key) (Races in bold indicate pole position) (Races in italics indicate fastest lap)

==== Star Mazda Championship ====
Year	Team	1	2	3	4	5	6	7	8	9	10	11	12	13	14	15	16	17	Rank	Points	Ref
2010	JDC MotorSports	SEB; 7	STP; 5	LAG; 4	ORP; 7	IOW; 4	NJ1; 4	NJ2; 8	ACC; 13	ACC; 5	TRO; 17	ROA; 3	MOS; 3	ATL; 1					**3rd**	**417**	
2011	Team Pelfrey	STP; 1	BAR; 10	IND; 1	MIL; 6	IOW; 11	MOS; 2	TRO; 5	TRO; 1	SON; 2	BAL; 10	LAG; 1							**2nd**	**401**	
2012	Juncos Racing	STP; 1	STP; 5	BAR; 5	BAR; 3	IND; 1	IOW; 3	TOR; 7	TOR; 16	EDM; 6	EDM; 13	TRO; 3	TRO; 13	BAL; 2	BAL; 3	LAG; 3	LAG; 3	ATL; 3	**4th**	**325**	

=== Complete Porsche Carrera Cup Germany results ===
(key) (Races in bold indicate pole position) (Races in italics indicate fastest lap)

Year	Team	1	2	3	4	5	6	7	8	9	10	11	12	13	14	15	16	17	18	Rank	Points
2013	FÖRCH Racing by Lukas Motorsport	HOC; 1; 10	HOC; 2; 11	NNS; 9	RBR; 1; 13	RBR; 2; 7	LAU; 1; 7	LAU; 2; 8	NOR; 1; 8	NOR; 2; 7	NÜR; 1; 7	NÜR; 2; 12	OSC; 1; 11	OSC; 2; 12	ZAN; 1; 4	ZAN; 2; 8	HOC; 1; 11	HOC; 2 Ret		9th	116
2014	FÖRCH Racing by Lukas Motorsport	HOC; 1; 5	**HOC**; **2**; 2	OSC; 1; 7	OSC; 2; 4	HUN; 1; 3	**HUN**; **2**; 1	NOR; 1 Ret	NOR; 2; 16	RBR; 1; 12	RBR; 2; 9	NÜR; 1; 10	NÜR; 2; 18	LAU; 1; 9	LAU; 2; 10	SAC; 1; 18	SAC; 2; 31	HOC; 1; 22	HOC; 2; 11	8th	121
2015	Land Motorsport	HOC; 1; 9	HOC; 2; 5	NNS; 11	LAU; 1; 9	LAU; 2; 11	NOR; 1; 3	NOR; 2; 9	ZAN; 1; 4	ZAN; 2; 11	RBR; 1; 11	RBR; 2; 5	OSC; 1; 9	OSC; 2; 17	NÜR; 1; 10	NÜR; 2; 14	HOC; 1; 17	HOC; 2; 6		10th	124

=== Complete Porsche Supercup results ===
(key) (Races in bold indicate pole position) (Races in italics indicate fastest lap)

Year	Team	1	2	3	4	5	6	7	8	9	10	11	Pos.	Points
2014	FÖRCH Racing by Lukas Motorsport	CAT; 11	MON; 4	RBR; DSQ	SIL; 4	HOC; 8	HUN; 13	SPA; 10	MNZ; 13	COA	COA		11th	54
2015	VERVA Lechner Racing Team	CAT; 11	MON; 7	**RBR**; 4	SIL; 14	HUN; 13	SPA; 18	SPA; 9	MNZ; 17	MNZ; 11	COA; C	COA; 5	12th	53

=== Complete IMSA SportsCar Championship results ===
(key) (Races in bold indicate pole position; results in italics indicate fastest lap)

Year	Team	Class	Make	Engine	1	2	3	4	5	6	7	8	9	10	11	12	Pos.	Points	Ref
2014	Park Place Motorsports	GTD	Porsche 911 GT America	Porsche 4.0 L Flat-6	DAY; 13	SEB	LGA	DET	WGL	MOS	IND	ELK	VIR	COA	PET		131st	1	
2015	Mühlner Motorsports America	GTD	Porsche 911 GT America	Porsche 4.0 L Flat-6	DAY; 15†	SEB; WD^{1}	LGA	BEL	WGL	LIM	ELK	VIR	AUS	PET			60th	1	
2016	Stevenson Motorsports	GTD	Audi R8 LMS	Audi 5.2 L V10	DAY	SEB; 8†	LGA	BEL	WGL	MOS	LIM	ELK	VIR	AUS	PET		65th	1	
2017	Montaplast by Land-Motorsport	GTD	Audi R8 LMS	Audi 5.2 L V10	DAY; 2	SEB; 4	LBH	AUS	BEL	WGL	MOS	LIM	ELK	VIR	LGA	PET; 1	28th	96	
2018	BMW Team RLL	GTLM	BMW M8 GTE	BMW S63 4.0 L Twin-turbo V8	DAY; 9	**SEB**; 2	LBH; 8	MDO; 2	WGL; 7	MOS; 7	LIM; 7	ELK; 6	VIR; 1	LGA; 1	PET; 4		6th	304	
2019	BMW Team RLL	GTLM	BMW M8 GTE	BMW S63 4.0 L Twin-turbo V8	DAY; 1	SEB; 7	LBH; 7	MDO; 4	WGL; 7	MOS; 4	LIM; 7	ELK; 5	VIR; 7	LGA; 5	PET; 3		6th	293	
2020	BMW Team RLL	GTLM	BMW M8 GTE	BMW S63 4.0 L Twin-turbo V8	DAY; 5	DAY; 4	SEB; 4	ELK; 6	VIR; 2	ATL; 1	MDO; 3	CLT; 3	PET; 6	LGA; 5	SEB; 4		4th	313	
2021	BMW Team RLL	GTLM	BMW M8 GTE	BMW S63 4.0 L Twin-turbo V8	DAY; 5	SEB; 2	DET	WGL; 3	WGL	LIM	ELK	LGA	LBH	VIR	PET; 5		7th	1251	
2022	BMW M Team RLL	GTD Pro	BMW M4 GT3	BMW P58 3.0 L Twin Turbo I6	DAY; 7	SEB; 10	LBH; 4	LGA; 3	**WGL**; 7	MOS; 5	LIM; 5	ELK; 5	VIR; 5	PET; 4			6th	2872	
2023	BMW M Team RLL	GTP	BMW M Hybrid V8	BMW P66/3 4.0 L Turbo V8	DAY; 9	SEB; 2	LBH; 2	MON; 8	WGL; 1	MOS; 3	ELK; 10	IMS; 3	PET; 7				6th	2687	
2024	BMW M Team RLL	GTP	BMW M Hybrid V8	BMW P66/3 4.0 L Turbo V8	DAY; 7	SEB; 4	LBH; 9	LGA; 7	DET; 10	WGL; 6	ELK; 10	IMS; 2	PET; 10				8th	2392	
2025	Paul Miller Racing	GTD Pro	BMW M4 GT3 Evo	BMW P58 3.0 L Twin Turbo I6	DAY; 4	SEB; 3	LGA	DET	WGL; 7	MOS		VIR	IMS; 8	PET; 9			15th	1389	
2025	Inter Europol Competition	LMP2	Oreca 07	Gibson GK428 4.2 L V8							ELK; 2						44th	341	
2026	Paul Miller Racing	GTD Pro	BMW M4 GT3 Evo	BMW P58 3.0 L Twin Turbo I6	DAY; 1	SEB; 5	LGA; 8	DET; 4	WGL; 2	**MOS**; 3	ELK; 11	VIR; 5	IMS; 6	**PET**; 3			1st	3012	

^{1} The No. 18 of Mühlner Motorsports America withdrew from the 12 Hours of Sebring before Practice.
^{†} De Phillippi did not complete sufficient laps in order to score full points.

=== Complete ADAC GT Masters results ===
(key) (Races in bold indicate pole position) (Races in italics indicate fastest lap)

Year	Team	Car	1	2	3	4	5	6	7	8	9	10	11	12	13	14	Rank	Points
2016	Montaplast by Land-Motorsport	Audi R8 LMS	**OSC**; **1**; 2	OSC; 2; 2	SAC; 1; 2	SAC; 2; 7	LAU; 1; 6	LAU; 2; 3	RBR; 1 Ret	RBR; 2; 6	NÜR; 1; 18	NÜR; 2; 1	**ZAN**; **1**; 2	ZAN; 2; 4	**HOC**; **1**; 2	HOC; 2; 8	**1st**	**168**
2017	Montaplast by Land-Motorsport	Audi R8 LMS	OSC; 1; 3	OSC; 2; 10	LAU; 1; 18	LAU; 2; 2	RBR; 1; 8	RBR; 2 Ret	ZAN; 1; 12	ZAN; 2; 1	NÜR; 1; 17	NÜR; 2; 6	**SAC**; **1**; 1	SAC; 2; 9	HOC; 1; 2	HOC; 2; 8	**3rd**	**120**

=== Complete 24 Hours of Nürburgring results ===
Year	Team	Co-Drivers	Car	Class	Laps	Pos.	Class Pos.
2016	(Germany) Montaplast By Land-Motorsport	(Germany) Marc Basseng (Germany) Mike Rockenfeller (Germany) Timo Scheider	Audi R8 LMS	SP9	67	DNF	DNF
2017	(Germany) Audi Sport Team Land	(Germany) Christopher Mies (South Africa) Kelvin van der Linde (Germany) Markus Winkelhock	Audi R8 LMS	SP9	158	**1st**	**1st**
2018	(Germany) ROWE Racing	(Finland) Jesse Krohn (United Kingdom) Alexander Sims (Germany) Martin Tomczyk	BMW M6 GT3	SP9	16	DNF	DNF
2019	(Germany) ROWE Racing	(United Kingdom) Tom Blomqvist (Austria) Philipp Eng (Denmark) Mikkel Jensen	BMW M6 GT3	SP9	22	DNF	DNF
2021	(Germany) ROWE Racing	(Germany) Martin Tomczyk (South Africa) Sheldon van der Linde (Germany) Marco Wittmann	BMW M6 GT3	SP9	59	**2nd**	**2nd**
2022	(Germany) ROWE Racing	(Austria) Philipp Eng (Brazil) Augusto Farfus (United Kingdom) Nick Yelloly	BMW M4 GT3	SP9	18	DNF	DNF
2023	(Germany) ROWE Racing	(Austria) Philipp Eng (Brazil) Augusto Farfus (United Kingdom) Nick Yelloly	BMW M4 GT3	SP9	83	DNF	DNF
2026	(Germany) Schubert Motorsport	(Germany) Jens Klingmann (United States) Neil Verhagen (Belgium) Ugo de Wilde	BMW M3 Touring 24H	SP-X	156	4th	1st

=== Complete GT World Challenge Europe results ===
==== GT World Challenge Europe Endurance Cup ====
(key) (Races in bold indicate pole position) (Races in italics indicate fastest lap)

Year	Team	Car	Class	1	2	3	4	5	6	7	Pos.	Points
2016	Belgian Audi Club Team WRT	Audi R8 LMS	Pro	MNZ	SIL	LEC	SPA; 6H	SPA; 12H	SPA; 24H	NÜR; Ret	NC	0
2017	Audi Sport Team WRT	Audi R8 LMS	Pro	MNZ	SIL	LEC	SPA; 6H; 4	SPA; 12H; 10	SPA; 24H; 5	CAT	20th	16
2018	ROWE Racing	BMW M6 GT3	Pro	MNZ	SIL; 13	LEC	SPA; 6H	SPA; 12H	SPA; 24H	CAT	NC	0
2024	Century Motorsport	BMW M4 GT3	Bronze	LEC	SPA; 6H; 49	SPA; 12H; 44	SPA; 24H; 33	NÜR	MNZ	JED	42nd	2
2025	BMW Italia Ceccato Racing	BMW M4 GT3 Evo	Bronze	LEC	MNZ	SPA; 6H; 57	SPA; 12H; 42	SPA; 24H; 49†	NÜR	CAT	NC	0

Sporting positions
Preceded by Sebastian Asch; Luca Ludwig	ADAC GT Masters Champion; 2016 with: Christopher Mies	Succeeded by Jules Gounon
