= 2011 Star Mazda Championship =

Seasons
- ← 2010 2012 →

The 2011 Star Mazda Championship was the 13th Star Mazda Championship season, the second under the Mazda Road to Indy program, and the first under IndyCar sanctioning, after 12 years under the International Motor Sports Association umbrella. As part of the program's expansion, the series champion will be provided a scholarship to advance into Firestone Indy Lights for the 2012 season. The season will feature 11 races over 10 weekends, with four road courses, three street circuits and three ovals on the schedule.

The series consisted of a main championship as well as an Expert championship for drivers over 30 years of age, combining previous years' Expert and Masters championships.

JDC MotorSports' Tristan Vautier won four races on his way to the championship by a 25-point margin over Connor De Phillippi, who also won four races. Vautier finished in the top five in every race. Andretti Autosport rookie Sage Karam also won two oval races and captured Rookie of The Year honors. J. W. Roberts won the Expert Championship when closest rival Walt Bowlin did not enter the final race of the season. The team championship went to Team Pelfrey which fielded cars for De Phllippi and Nick Andries, who finished third in points.

== Drivers and teams ==
Team	No.	Drivers	Notes
(United States) JDC MotorSports	5	(France) Tristan Vautier	
(United States) JDC MotorSports	19	(Russia) Mikhail Goikhberg	Infineon only
(United States) JDC MotorSports	27	(United States) Nick Mancuso	Selected races
(United States) JDC MotorSports	39	(Brazil) João Jardim	Indianapolis onwards
(United States) JDC MotorSports	64	(United States) Patrick O'Neill	Expert; Infineon only
(United States) JDC MotorSports	85	(United States) Chris Miller	St. Pete and Mosport only
(United States) Juncos Racing	7	(Brazil) João Victor Horto	
(United States) Juncos Racing	10	(Colombia) Tatiana Calderón	
(United States) Juncos Racing	28	(United States) Gustavo Menezes	
(United States) Juncos Racing	39	(United States) Richard Heistand	Left team after St. Pete
(United States) Juncos Racing	60	(Chile) Martin Scuncio	Left series after Mosport
(United States) Team Pelfrey	11	(United States) Connor De Phillippi	
(United States) Team Pelfrey	81	(United States) Nick Andries	
(United States) World Speed Motorsports	16	(United Kingdom) Lloyd Read	Laguna Seca only
(United States) Team GDT	19	(United States) Richard Heistand	Barber only
(United States) Team GDT	37	(United States) Dom Bastien	Expert; Laguna Seca only
(United States) Team GDT	48	(Republic of Ireland) Patrick McKenna	Skipped Milwaukee, Iowa and Baltimore
(United States) Team GDT	65	(United States) J. W. Roberts	Expert; Skipped Barber and Milwaukee
(Venezuela) Linares Racing	20	(Venezuela) Carlos Linares	
(Canada) AIM Autosport	23	(United States) Walt Bowlin	Expert; St. Pete, Barber, Mosport, Trois-Rivières, Infineon and Baltimore only
(Canada) AIM Autosport	66	(Canada) Zack Meyer	St. Pete and Barber only
(Canada) AIM Autosport	72	(United States) Larry Pegram	Expert; St. Pete, Barber, Trois-Rivières, Infineon only
(Canada) AIM Autosport	99	(United States) Learic Cramer	Baltimore only
(Canada) The Racing Company	26	(Canada) Jérimy Daniel	Skipped Iowa and Infineon
(United States) Fogg Racing	29	(United States) Phil Fogg, Jr.	Expert; Infineon only
(United States) Andretti Autosport	77	(United States) Zach Veach	Infineon and Laguna Seca only
(United States) Andretti Autosport	88	(United States) Sage Karam	

== Race calendar and results ==
The race schedule was announced on December 20, 2010.

Rnd	Circuit	Location	Date	Pole position	Fastest lap	Winning driver	Winning team	Supporting
1	Streets of St. Petersburg	St. Petersburg, Florida	March 26	(Chile) Martin Scuncio	(United States) Connor De Phillippi	(United States) Connor De Phillippi	(United States) Team Pelfrey	IndyCar Series
2	Barber Motorsports Park	Birmingham, Alabama	April 10	(France) Tristan Vautier	(France) Tristan Vautier	(France) Tristan Vautier	(United States) JDC MotorSports	IndyCar Series
3	Lucas Oil Raceway at Indianapolis	Brownsburg, Indiana	May 28	(United States) Connor De Phillippi	(United States) Nick Andries	(United States) Connor De Phillippi	(United States) Team Pelfrey	USAC Midgets
4	Milwaukee Mile	West Allis, Wisconsin	June 19	(United States) Nick Andries	(United States) Sage Karam	(United States) Sage Karam	(United States) Andretti Autosport	IndyCar Series
5	Iowa Speedway	Newton, Iowa	June 25	(United States) Sage Karam	(United States) Sage Karam	(United States) Sage Karam	(United States) Andretti Autosport	IndyCar Series
6	Mosport International Raceway	Bowmanville, Ontario	July 24	(United States) Sage Karam	(United States) Nick Andries	(Brazil) João Victor Horto	(United States) Juncos Racing	American Le Mans Series
7	Circuit Trois-Rivières	Trois-Rivières, Quebec	August 6	(France) Tristan Vautier	(France) Tristan Vautier	(France) Tristan Vautier	(United States) JDC MotorSports	Firestone Indy Lights
8	Circuit Trois-Rivières	Trois-Rivières, Quebec	August 7	(France) Tristan Vautier	(United States) Connor De Phillippi	(United States) Connor De Phillippi	(United States) Team Pelfrey	Firestone Indy Lights
9	Infineon Raceway	Sonoma, California	August 27	(France) Tristan Vautier	(France) Tristan Vautier	(France) Tristan Vautier	(United States) JDC MotorSports	IndyCar Series
10	Streets of Baltimore	Baltimore, Maryland	September 4	(France) Tristan Vautier	(France) Tristan Vautier	(France) Tristan Vautier	(United States) JDC MotorSports	IndyCar Series
11	Mazda Raceway Laguna Seca	Monterey, California	September 18	(United States) Connor De Phillippi	(United States) Connor De Phillippi	(United States) Connor De Phillippi	(United States) Team Pelfrey	American Le Mans Series

== Championship standings ==
=== Drivers' ===
Pos	Driver	STP (United States)	BAR (United States)	IND (United States)	MIL (United States)	IOW (United States)	MOS (Canada)	TRO (Canada)		SON (United States)	BAL (United States)	LAG (United States)	Points
Overall
1	(France) Tristan Vautier	3	**1**	4	4	4	5	**1**	**3**	**1**	**1**	5	426
2	(United States) Connor De Phillippi	1	10	**1**	6	11	2	5	1	2	10	**1**	401
3	(United States) Nick Andries	17	2	2	**3**	7	4	3	2	3	9	2	385
4	(Brazil) João Victor Horto	14	4	5	7	2	1	2	4	6	3	6	375
5	(United States) Sage Karam	15	9	3	1	**1**	**13**	4	5	4	2	16	364
6	(Colombia) Tatiana Calderón	18	3	9	9	5	3	12	8	5	8	7	322
7	(Venezuela) Carlos Linares	6	5	13	10	8	10	7	9	13	11	8	301
8	(United States) Gustavo Menezes	8	7	7	5	3	6	6	6	9	4	15	297
9	(Brazil) João Jardim			14	8	6	8	14	7	8	7	12	244
10	(Canada) Jérimy Daniel	10	15	10	12		11	8	10		5	10	237
11	(United States) J. W. Roberts	11		12		10		9	12	14	13	13	200
12	(United States) Nick Mancuso	7	6	8	11	9				10		9	194
13	(Chile) Martin Scuncio	**2**	11	6	2	12	9						187
14	(Republic of Ireland) Patrick McKenna	4	13	11			14	13	14			4	186
15	(United States) Walt Bowlin	16	14				12	11	13	16	6		168
16	(United States) Larry Pegram	13^{1}	8					10	11	12			105
17	(United States) Chris Miller	5					7						61
18	(Canada) Zack Meyer	12	12										48
19	(United States) Richard Heistand	9	16										47
Expert Class
1	(United States) J. W. Roberts	11		12		10		9	12	14	13	13	148
2	(United States) Walt Bowlin	16	14				12	11	13	16	6		114
3	(United States) Larry Pegram	13^{1}	8					10	11	12			76
unregistered drivers
	(United States) Zach Veach									7		3	
	(Russia) Mikhail Goikhberg									11			
	(United Kingdom) Lloyd Read											11	
	(United States) Learic Cramer										12		
	(United States) Dom Bastien											14	
	(United States) Phil Fogg, Jr.									15			
	(United States) Patrick O'Neill									17			
Pos	Driver	STP (United States)	BAR (United States)	IND (United States)	MIL (United States)	IOW (United States)	MOS (Canada)	TRO (Canada)		SON (United States)	BAL (United States)	LAG (United States)	Points

Color	Result
Gold	Winner
Silver	2nd place
Bronze	3rd place
Green	4th & 5th place
Light Blue	6th–10th place
Dark Blue	Finished (Outside Top 10)
Purple	Did not finish
Red	Did not qualify (DNQ)
Brown	Withdrawn (Wth)
Black	Disqualified (DSQ)
White	Did not start (DNS)
Blank	Did not participate (DNP)
Blank	Not competing

**In-line notation**
**Bold**	Pole position (1 point)
Italics	Ran fastest race lap (1 point)

^{1}Larry Pegram was not registered for the championship at St. Pete and not eligible for points.

Position	1	2	3	4	5	6	7	8	9	10	11	12	13	14	15	16	17	18	19	20	21	22	23	24	25	26	27	28	29	30	31	32	33	34	35
Points	44	40	37	34	32	30	29	28	27	26	25	24	23	22	21	20	19	18	17	16	15	14	13	12	11	10	9	8	7	6	5	4	3	2	1

=== Teams' ===
Pos	Team	Points
1	(United States) Team Pelfrey	293
2	(United States) Juncos Racing	274
3	(United States) JDC MotorSports	270
4	(United States) Andretti Autosport	195
5	(Venezuela) Linares Racing	144
6	(United States) Team GDT	118
7	(Canada) The Racing Company	113
8	(Canada) AIM Autosport	86
