= Red Intercable (Argentina) =

Red Intercable SA is a network of independent cable television operators in Argentina. This company acts as an agent for more than 230 small and medium enterprises (SMEs) in over 580 locations in 21 provinces. It reaches more than 610,000 households around the country.

== History ==
The roots of Red Intercable are linked to the very origin of cable television in Argentina. In the 60s, small entrepreneurs in the interior, at their own risk and effort, developed networks in remote towns of the great capitals that were not in reach of the air television. In the 90s, driven by the various provincial associations, an organization of cable operators emerged. This organization grouped both of Argentina's largest operators of small systems, as Cable Television. In 1998, during one of the concentration processes that took place in Argentina, separate cable operators created Red Intercable SA.

== Services ==
- Digital Television for SMEs Pack Programming Platform Content Complementarios
- Monthly Magazine subscribers
- Enabling-Disabling Centralized Remote Encoding Addressable
- Tax Advice
- Legal and audio signal with exclusive content

=== NOC ===
Red Intercable Digital SA, has an operations center where workers carry out their maintenance, control, and monitoring of the network in different localities to which it serves.

=== Research and development ===
As a broadband product, Red Intercable later developed Soon Digital SA: an Internet service and IP telephone company that provides connectivity to the localities in which it operates.
