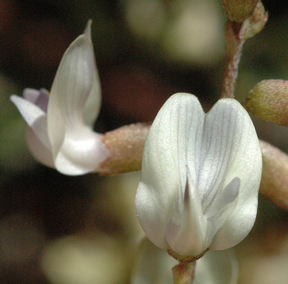

Conservation status
- Critically Imperiled (NatureServe)

Scientific classification
- Kingdom: Plantae
- Clade: Tracheophytes
- Clade: Angiosperms
- Clade: Eudicots
- Clade: Rosids
- Order: Fabales
- Family: Fabaceae
- Subfamily: Faboideae
- Genus: Astragalus
- Species: A. applegatei

Binomial name
- Astragalus applegatei M.Peck

Synonyms
- Astragalus applegatii M.Peck, orth. var.

= Astragalus applegatei =

Applegate's milkvetch

Species of legume

Astragalus applegatei is a rare species of milkvetch known by the common name Applegate's milkvetch. Its scientific name is also spelt Astragalus applegatii. It is endemic to Klamath County, Oregon, where it is known from three populations, one of which is made up of only three plants. Much of the remaining habitat is seriously threatened by development, introduced plant species, and other forces. This is a federally listed endangered species of the United States.

The plant is a perennial herb with clustered or spreading prostrate stems growing from a taproot. It may form mats nearly a metre wide and up to 40 cm tall. The leaves are up to 8 cm long and are each made up of several pairs of leaflets 1 or 2 cm long. The inflorescence is a raceme of nodding flowers. The flower has a cuplike, toothed calyx of sepals coated in black hairs. The corolla is whitish to lavender with purple tips on the petals. The fruit is a purple-mottled legume pod roughly 1 cm long.

The native habitat of the plant is a seasonally wet floodplain with alkali soils, part of the Klamath Basin.

The largest of the three populations is on land which is partially owned and protected by The Nature Conservancy, but the other part is vulnerable to development. The second and third populations are very small and may not survive as they become inbred. There was once a fourth population, but it was destroyed when its habitat was made into a grocery store and a car dealership.
