= Colegio Helvetia =

Private Swiss school in Bogotá, Colombia

Coordinates: 4.71486°N 74.07622°W

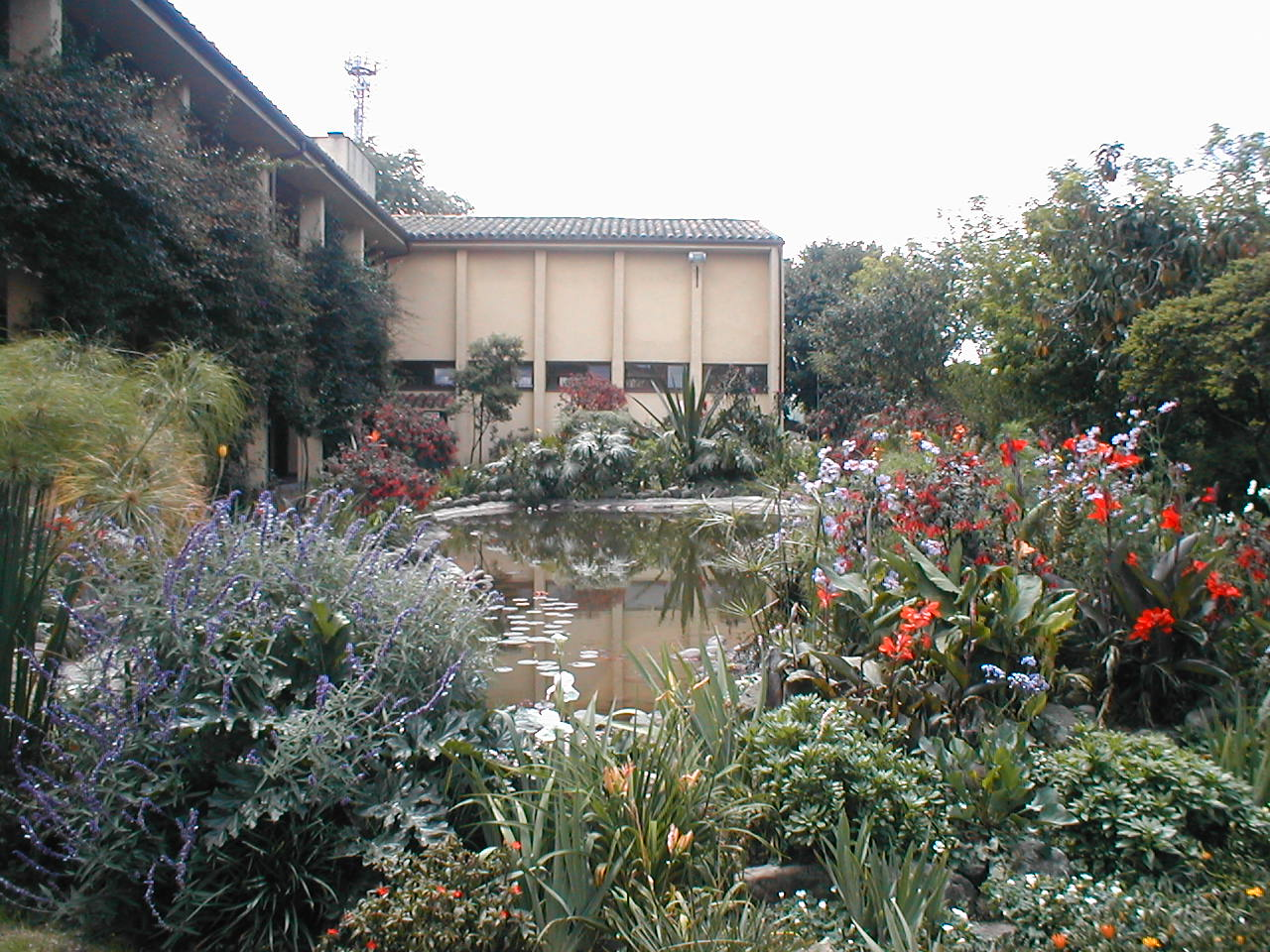
Pond of the school

Colegio Helvetia is a private multilingual (Spanish, German, French) Swiss school located in Suba, Bogotá, Colombia.

== History ==
Founded in 1949, only 49 students and 5 Swiss teachers activities in an old house located in the Carrera Séptima (Seventh Avenue) in Bogotá. Four years later, it was moved to its current location, at the 128th street near the Avenida Boyacá. The new buildings were constructed by Victor Schmidt, a Swiss architect who lived his last years in Colombia. The Colegio Helvetia was declared Colombia's national monument in 1992. The first group of students graduated in 1956.

Since its founding year until 1969, the school only taught in Spanish and French, but in that year, a German section began and boys and girls, who received classes in different groups, were brought together. The buildings did not change much until the year 2000, where the CI (Centro de Investigación) was built, a modern and complete library with books in Spanish, German, French, English and Italian, and broadband Internet access.

In 2003, former principal Karl Schmidt implemented the Matura, a demanding four-year programme of international education Swiss diploma, that grants students access to any university in Switzerland or in the European Union. The first class to graduate with the Matura was the 2007 class, on June 29.

== Features ==
The school is divided into three levels: Dibi-Däbi (kinder 1- second grade), primary school (third grade-sixth grade) and high school( seventh grade- twelfth grade). It has two sections, French and German. The school has two libraries, one for Dibi- Däbi and one for the other two levels. It also has one gym, two soccer fields, three basketball courts and 5 volleyball courts.

== Campus ==
The campus is known since it is mostly grass, with classical, beautiful buildings and many trees and flowers. It has a small lake with fish and turtles, which is surrounded by plants of all kinds. In the library there are many computers which the students can use when they want, and two new computer rooms will be built during the second semester of 2008.
