= 2016 Monterey Grand Prix =

American sports car races

Track map of Mazda Raceway Laguna Seca

The 2016 Continental Tire Monterey Grand Prix were a pair of sports car races sanctioned by the International Motor Sports Association (IMSA) held on the Mazda Raceway Laguna Seca in Monterey, California, United States, on May 1, 2016. The events served as the fourth of twelve scheduled rounds of the 2016 IMSA SportsCar Championship. Both races were contested over two hours. The race marked the third time that the course had been used for IMSA racing and the second time that the venue had featured a doubleheader weekend with two races.

During the first race, the No. 55 Mazda Prototype driven by of Tristan Nunez started in first position overall and held the lead until a slow pit stop during the second full course caution period.This handed the lead to Sean Rayhall in the No. 0 DeltaWing who held first position until Oswaldo Negri Jr. overtook Rayhall on the restart. Negri maintained the No. 60 Michael Shank Racing Ligier's advantage after the final pit stop cycle to secure the victory. VisitFlorida Racing's No. 90 car of Marc Goossens and Ryan Dalziel finished second and the No. 31 Action Express Racing Corvette Daytona Prototype of Eric Curran and Dane Cameron came in third. Ford Chip Ganassi Racing won the Grand Touring Le Mans (GTLM) category with a Ford GT shared by Ryan Briscoe and Richard Westbrook after Westbrook saved fuel in the closing minutes. Scuderia Corsa were second in class with Daniel Serra and Alessandro Pier Guidi. Porsche took third with Earl Bamber and Frédéric Makowiecki sharing a 911 RSR.

During the second race, Robert Alon started in first position overall, but was passed by James French on lap 4. After the pit stop cycle, Tom Kimber-Smith took the lead and maintained the PR1/Mathiasen Motorsports' car advantage to secure victory in the Prototype Challenge (PC) category. Alex Popow and Renger van der Zande finished second, while Jon Bennett and Colin Braun was third. Mario Farnbacher and Alex Riberas in the No. 23 Alex Job Racing Porsche were unchallenged throughout the race and took the victory in the Grand Touring Daytona (GTD) class. Christina Nielsen and Alessandro Balzan were second in class for Scuderia Corsa, and TRG's Brandon Davis and James Davison took third.

The result meant Cameron and Curran took over the lead of the Prototype Drivers' Championship with 121 points. Negri Jr. and Pew moved from seventh to fifth. Simpson and Goikhberg continued to top the Prototype Challenge Drivers' Championship with 128 points, but their advantage was reduced to zero points as Alon and Kimber-Smith took over second position. Gavin and Milner continued to the GTLM Drivers' Championship, but their advantage was reduced by six points as Bamber and Makowiecki took over second in the GTLM Drivers' Championship. Honda and Chevrolet left Laguna Seca as the respective Prototype and GTLM Manufactures' Championship leaders with eight races left in the season.

== Background ==
=== Preview ===
International Motor Sports Association (IMSA) president Scott Atherton confirmed the race was part of the schedule for the 2016 IMSA SportsCar Championship (IMSA SCC) in August 2015. It was the third consecutive year the event was held as part of the WeatherTech SportsCar Championship. The 2016 Continental Tire Monterey Grand Prix was the fourth of twelve scheduled sports car races of 2016 by IMSA, and it was the second round not held as part of the North American Endurance Cup. The events were held at the eleven-turn 2.238 mi (3.602 km) Mazda Raceway Laguna Seca in Monterey County, California on May 1, 2016. Due to the field size, IMSA would use a doubleheader race format where the Prototype and GTLM classes would participate in the first event while the Prototype Challenge and GTD classes would participate in the second event.

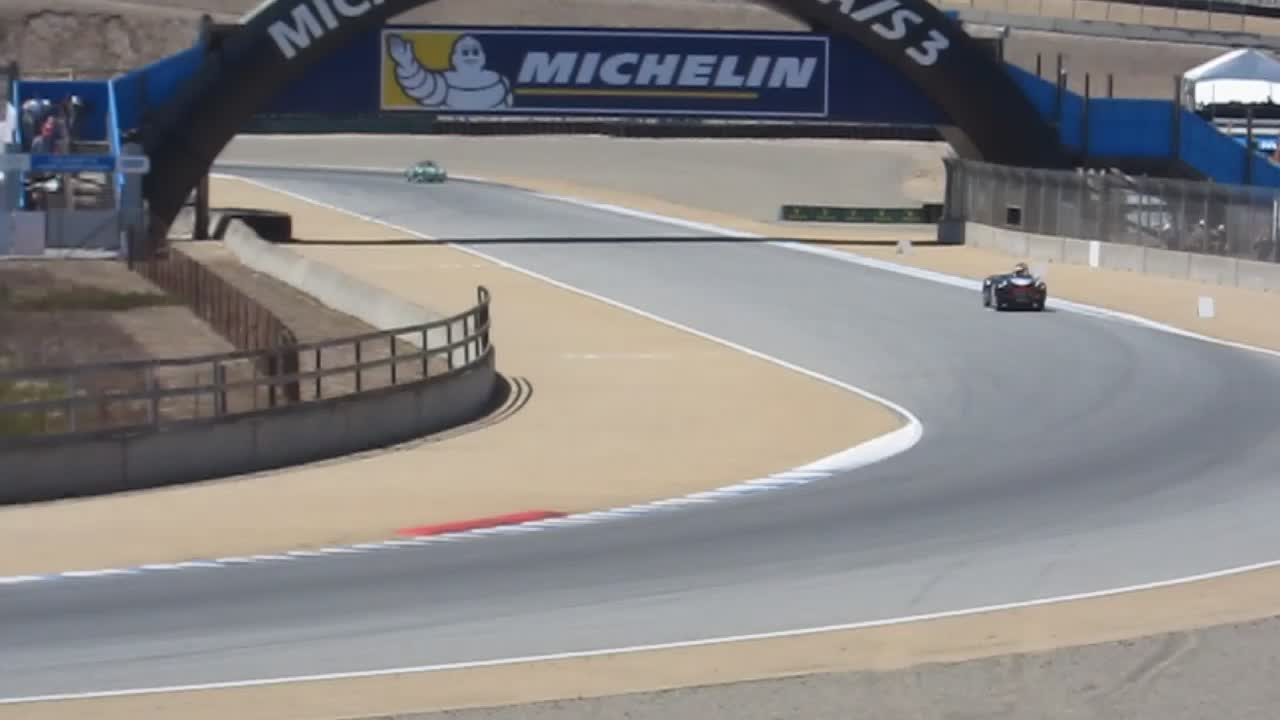
Mazda Raceway Laguna Seca, where the races were held.

Before the race, João Barbosa and Christian Fittipaldi led the Prototype Drivers' Championship with 93 points, ahead of Eric Curran and Dane Cameron with 90 points, and Jordan Taylor and Ricky Taylor in third with 89 points. With 101 points, PC was led by Misha Goikhberg and Stephen Simpson with an eight-point advantage over Alex Popow and Renger van der Zande. In GTLM, the Drivers' Championship was led by Oliver Gavin and Tommy Milner with 105 points; the trio held an eighteen-point gap over Earl Bamber and Frédéric Makowiecki. Andy Lally, John Potter, and Marco Seefried led the GTD Drivers' Championship with 67 points; the trio held a five-point advantage over Alessandro Balzan, Christina Nielsen, and Jeff Segal. Honda, Chevrolet, and Audi were leading their respective Manufacturers' Championships, while Action Express Racing, JDC-Miller MotorSports, Corvette Racing, and Magnus Racing each led their own Teams' Championships.

=== Entry list ===
Forty-two cars were officially entered for the Continental Tire Monterey Grand Prix, with the bulk of entries in the two Grand Touring (GT) categories: Grand Touring Le Mans (GTLM) and Grand Touring Daytona (GTD). Since the majority of the remaining rounds of the 2016 IMSA SportsCar Championship were sprint races, GTD teams entered their regular driver pairings for the first time this season. Action Express Racing (AER) fielded two Chevrolet Corvette DP cars while VisitFlorida Racing (VFR) and WTR fielded one. Mazda Motorsports had two Lola B12/80 cars and Michael Shank Racing (MSR) entered one Ligier JS P2. Panoz brought the DeltaWing car to Laguna Seca for the fourth successive year. The Prototype Challenge (PC) class was composed of seven Oreca FLM09 cars: two from Starworks Motorsports. BAR1 Motorsports, CORE Autosport, JDC-Miller MotorSports, Performance Tech Motorsports and PR1/Mathiasen Motorsports entered one car each. GTLM was represented by ten entries from five different brands. Alessandro Pier Guidi returned to the No. 68 Scuderia Corsa entry. In the list of GTD entrants, seventeen GT3-specification vehicles were represented by seven different manufacturers. Lone Star Racing made their season debut.

== Practice ==
There were three practice sessions preceding the start of the races on Sunday: two on Friday and one on Saturday.The first two one-hour sessions were on Friday morning and afternoon while the third session on Saturday morning lasted 45 minutes.

In the first practice session, Joel Miller set the fastest time in the No. 70 Mazda with a time of 1 minute, 18.564 seconds, 0.004 seconds faster than teammate Jonathan Bomarito in the No. 55 Mazda. Oswaldo Negri Jr. was third fastest in the No. 60 Ligier, Ricky Taylor's No. 10 Corvette DP placed fourth, and Dane Cameron's No. 31 AER car rounded out the top five. The fastest PC class car was Renger van der Zande in the No. 8 Starworks entry with 1 minute, 20.018 seconds, followed by Colin Braun in the No. 54 CORE Autosport car. The GTLM class was topped by the No. 68 Ferrari 488 GTE of Alessandro Pier Guidi. Dirk Müller in the No. 66 Ford GT was second and Toni Vilander's No. 62 Ferrari was third. Alex Riberas in the No. 23 Team Seattle/Alex Job Racing Porsche was fastest in GTD with a time of 1 minute, 25.260 seconds.

In the second practice session, Bomarito's No. 55 Mazda was fastest with a time of 1 minute, 18.139 seconds, ahead of the No. 70 Mazda. The seven-vehicle PC class was led by CORE Autosport's No. 54 car, driven by Braun with a time of 1 minute, 19.673 seconds. Scuderia Corsa's Daniel Serra led GTLM from Joey Hand's second-placed No. 66 Ford GT. Mario Farnbacher led GTD with a time of 1 minute, 25.390 seconds.

Miller led the final session in the No. 70 Mazda with a lap of 1 minute, 18.478 seconds. Tristan Nunez's No. 55 Mazda was second fastest. The No. 60 Ligier of Negri set the third-quickest lap. Dane Cameron's No. 31 AER car, along with Jordan Taylor's No. 10 WTR Corvette DP were fourth and fifth. A 1:20.094 lap saw van der Zande's No. 8 Starworks vehicle lead PC over Braun's CORE Autosport entry. Ferrari paced GTLM with Risi Competizione's 488 of Vilander lapping 1:23.086, ahead of the two Ford GTs. With a 1:25.639 lap, Riberas led the GTD class in the No. 23 Porsche, followed by Jens Klingmann's No. 96 Turner Motorsport BMW M6.

== Qualifying ==
Saturday afternoon's 90-minute four-group qualifying session gave 15-minute sessions to all categories. Cars in GTD were sent out first before those grouped in GTLM, PC, and Prototype had three separate identically timed sessions. Regulations stipulated teams to nominate one qualifying driver, with the fastest laps determining each classes starting order. IMSA would arranged the grid to put all Prototypes ahead of the PC, GTLM, and GTD cars.

Nunez in the No. 55 Mazda set a new category track record, and took his first career pole position with a lap of 1 minutes, 18.143 seconds. He was joined on the grid's front row by Tom Long whose best lap in the sister No. 70 car was 0.236 seconds slower. Cameron's No. 31 Corvette DP took third followed by Ricky Taylor's No. 10 WTR car in fourth. Christian Fittipaldi's No. 5 ATR car started from fifth place. Sean Rayhall qualified the DeltaWing in sixth position. In GTLM, Serra took his first pole of the season with a lap of 1 minutes, 22.867 seconds. Ford took second and third positions, led by its No. 67 car driven by Briscoe (whose time was 0.169 seconds faster than Müller's third-placed No. 66 entry). The duo of Corvette Racing Chevrolet Corvette C7.Rs were fourth and sixth: Tommy Milner in the No. 4 car was faster than the sister No. 3 entry of Jan Magnussen. They were separated by fifth-placed Vilander in the No. 62 Ferrari. The two BMW Team RLL entries and Porsche North America cars rounded out the GTLM qualifiers.

On his tenth lap, Alon took pole position for PR1/Mathiasen Motorsports with a time 1 minute, 21.146 in PC. James French's Performance Tech car qualified second, and Alex Popow's No. 8 Starworks vehicle took third. Riberas took pole position in GTD in AJR's No. 23 Porsche with a 1-minute, 25.775 seconds time. Christina Nielsen put the No. 63 Scuderia Corsa Ferrari second, Patrick Lindsey for Park Place was third and Cédric Sbirrazzuoli's No. 27 Dream Lamborghini took fourth.

=== Qualifying results ===
Pole positions in each class are indicated in bold and by ‡. P stands for Prototype, PC (Prototype Challenge), GTLM (Grand Touring Le Mans) and GTD (Grand Touring Daytona).

Pos.	Class	No.	Team	Driver	Time	Gap	Grid
1	**P**	**55**	**(Japan) Mazda Motorsports**	**(United States) Tristan Nunez**	**1:18.143**	—	1‡ **(1)**
2	P	70	(Japan) Mazda Motorsports	(United States) Tom Long	1:18.379	+0.236	2 **(1)**
3	P	31	(United States) Action Express Racing	(United States) Dane Cameron	1:19.072	+0.929	3 **(1)**
4	P	10	(United States) Wayne Taylor Racing	(United States) Ricky Taylor	1:19.119	+0.976	4 **(1)**
5	P	5	(United States) Action Express Racing	(Brazil) Christian Fittipaldi	1:19.214	+1.071	5 **(1)**
6	P	0	(United States) Panoz DeltaWing Racing	(United States) Sean Rayhall	1:19.301	+1.158	6 **(1)**
7	P	90	(United States) VisitFlorida Racing	(United Kingdom) Ryan Dalziel	1:19.652	+1.509	7 **(1)**
8	P	60	(United States) Michael Shank Racing with Curb-Agajanian	(United States) John Pew	1:20.881	+2.738	8 **(1)**
9	**PC**	**52**	**(United States) PR1/Mathiasen Motorsports**	**(United States) Robert Alon**	**1:21.146**	**+3.003**	1‡ **(2)**
10	PC	38	(United States) Performance Tech Motorsports	(United States) James French	1:21.285	+3.142	2 **(2)**
11	PC	8	(United States) Starworks Motorsport	(Venezuela) Alex Popow	1:21.564	+3.421	3 **(2)**
12	PC	20	(United States) BAR1 Motorsports	(United States) Matt McMurry	1:22.088	+3.945	4 **(2)**
13	PC	54	(United States) CORE Autosport	(United States) Jon Bennett	1:22.842	+4.699	5 **(2)**
14	PC	85	(United States) JDC-Miller MotorSports	(Canada) Misha Goikhberg	1:22.863	+4.720	6 **(2)**
15	**GTLM**	**68**	**(United States) Scuderia Corsa**	**(Brazil) Daniel Serra**	**1:22.867**	**+4.724**	9‡ **(1)**
16	GTLM	67	(United States) Ford Chip Ganassi Racing	(Australia) Ryan Briscoe	1:22.946	+4.803	10 **(1)**
17	GTLM	66	(United States) Ford Chip Ganassi Racing	(Germany) Dirk Müller	1:23.115	+4.972	11 **(1)**
18	GTLM	4	(United States) Corvette Racing	(United States) Tommy Milner	1:23.385	+5.242	12 **(1)**
19	GTLM	62	(United States) Risi Competizione	(Finland) Toni Vilander	1:23.399	+5.256	13 **(1)**
20	GTLM	3	(United States) Corvette Racing	(Denmark) Jan Magnussen	1:23.450	+5.307	14 **(1)**
21	GTLM	25	(United States) BMW Team RLL	(Germany) Dirk Werner	1:23.571	+5.428	15 **(1)**
22	GTLM	912	(United States) Porsche North America	(New Zealand) Earl Bamber	1:23.963	+5.820	16**^{1}** **(1)**
23	GTLM	911	(United States) Porsche North America	(United Kingdom) Nick Tandy	1:24.049	+5.906	**17^{2} (1)**
24	GTLM	100	(United States) BMW Team RLL	(Germany) Lucas Luhr	1:24.382	+6.239	18 **(1)**
25	**GTD**	**23**	**(United States) Team Seattle/Alex Job Racing**	**(Spain) Alex Riberas**	**1:25.775**	**+7.632**	8‡ **(2)**
26	GTD	63	(United States) Scuderia Corsa	(Denmark) Christina Nielsen	1:26.497	+8.354	9 **(2)**
27	GTD	73	(United States) Park Place Motorsports	(United States) Patrick Lindsey	1:26.943	+8.800	23**^{3}** **(2)**
28	GTD	27	(United States) Dream Racing	(Monaco) Cédric Sbirrazzuoli	1:27.184	+9.041	22**^{4}** **(2)**
29	PC	88	(United States) Starworks Motorsport	(United States) Mark Kvamme	1:27.250	+9.107	7 **(2)**
30	GTD	007	(United States) TRG-AMR	(United States) Brandon Davis	1:27.273	+9.130	10 **(2)**
31	GTD	6	(United States) Stevenson Motorsports	(United States) Andrew Davis	1:27.277	+9.134	11 **(2)**
32	GTD	96	(United States) Turner Motorsport	(United States) Bret Curtis	1:27.354	+9.211	12 **(2)**
33	GTD	16	(United States) Change Racing	(United States) Corey Lewis	1:27.422	+9.279	13 **(2)**
34	GTD	48	(United States) Paul Miller Racing	(United States) Madison Snow	1:27.476	+9.333	**14 (2)**
35	GTD	540	(United States) Black Swan Racing	(United States) Tim Pappas	1:27.735	+9.592	**15 (2)**
36	GTD	9	(United States) Stevenson Motorsports	(United States) Matt Bell	1:27.945	+9.802	**16 (2)**
37	GTD	33	(United States) Riley Motorsports	(United States) Ben Keating	1:28.062	+9.919	**17 (2)**
38	GTD	97	(United States) Turner Motorsport	(United States) Michael Marsal	1:28.118	+9.975	**18 (2)**
39	GTD	44	(United States) Magnus Racing	(United States) John Potter	1:28.348	+10.205	**19 (2)**
40	GTD	11	(United States) Change Racing	(United States) Bill Sweedler	1:28.451	+10.308	**20 (2)**
41	GTD	80	(United States) Lone Star Racing	(United States) Dan Knox	1:29.825	+11.682	**21^{5} (2)**
42	GTD	22	(United States) Alex Job Racing	(United States) Cooper MacNeil	1:43.968	+25.825	24^{6} **(2)**

Key	Meaning
**(1)**	Race One
**(2)**	Race Two

Notes:

- **^1** – The No. 912 Porsche North America entry was sent to the rear of the GTLM grid after the team elected to change tires after qualifying.
- **^2** – The No. 911 Porsche North America entry was sent to the rear of the GTLM grid after the team elected to change tires after qualifying.
- **^3** – The No. 73 Park Place Motorsports Porsche was sent to the rear of the GTD grid after the team elected to change tires after qualifying.
- **^4** – The No. 27 Dream Racing Lamborghini was sent to the rear of the GTD grid for changing their starting driver.
- **^5** – The No. 80 Lone Star Racing Dodge was sent to the rear of the GTD grid after the team elected to change tires after qualifying.
- **^6** – The No. 22 Alex Job Racing Porsche was sent to the rear of the GTD grid after the team elected to change tires after qualifying.

== Races ==
=== Race 1 ===
Eighteen cars were due to start, but Dalziel was in the pit lane to serve a drive-through penalty after his car did not make it to the grid in time. Nunez maintained his pole position advantage while Fittipaldi and Ricky Taylor overtook Cameron for third and fourth. Milner attempted to pass Briscoe and Müller in GTLM, but was unsuccessful before Vilander overtook Milner for fourth at turn eleven. Nunez and Long pulled away from the third-placed Fittipaldi by over 10 seconds before the first full course caution came out and the safety car appeared. The tire barrier at the Corkscrew was dislodged and necessitated a full course yellow. When racing resumed, Nunez maintained the lead from Long and Fittipaldi at the rolling restart on lap 10. A second full course yellow was called for on the twenty-fourth lap when Ricky Taylor passed Fittipaldi at turn nine. Fittipaldi attempted to overtake Taylor at turn ten, but lost traction on his Action Express car and sent both cars into the gravel trap. Under caution, majority of the field made pit stops for fuel, tires, and driver changes. The No. 55 Mazda had a slow pit stop due to refueling issues. The car eventually got refueled and Bomarito rejoined the race. Rayhall's DeltaWing took the overall lead following pit stops for the Prototype class. Dirk Werner's No. 25 BMW M6 had pitted earlier and advanced to first in GTLM through an alternate strategy.

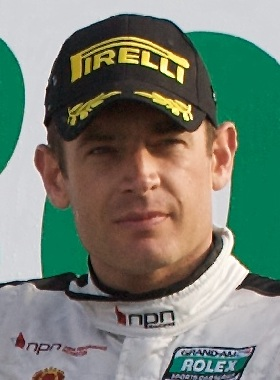
Richard Westbrook (pictured in 2010) saved enough fuel to win the GTLM category for the No. 67 team in the first race.

Rayhall led the restart on lap 29. That lap, Negri moved to second position by passing Curran at turn one. Later that lap, Negri's MSR Ligier overtook Rayhall at turn eleven to take the overall lead. On lap 36, the final caution was given. Miller's No. 70 Mazda stopped at turn seven with a fuel pump failure and the car was retired. At the restart on lap 38, Negri maintained his lead over Bomarito. Werner pitted at the end of lap 38 and promoted Fisichella to the lead in GTLM. Pilet dropped to seventh in GTLM after being overtaken by Hand, Westbrook, Gavin, and García. Bomarito made an error, and spun at turn 10 on lap 45. After the final pit stop cycle, Negri kept his lead and Goossens moved to second. Hand moved into the lead of GTLM through an alternate strategy. With just under 15 minutes remaining, Westbrook overtook Hand for the lead in GTLM. Hand and García made late pit stops for fuel. Negri maintained the lead for the rest of the race winning after completing 80 laps. Goossens finished second, 30.099 seconds adrift of the No. 60 MSR Ligier, and Curran completed the podium positions by finishing third. Westbrook conserved enough fuel over the final 52 laps to win for Ford Chip Ganassi Racing by 12.545 seconds over Alessandro Pier Guidi's No. 68 Ferrari 488 GTE in second. Porsche completed the GTLM podium in third with the No. 912 car. It was the Ford GT's first victory in five starts globally.

=== Race results ===
Class winners are denoted in bold and ‡. P stands for Prototype, and GTLM (Grand Touring Le Mans).

Final race classification
Pos	Class	No.	Team	Drivers	Chassis	Tire	Laps	Time/Retired
Pos	Class	No.	Team	Drivers	Engine	Tire	Laps	Time/Retired
1	**P**	**60**	**(United States) Michael Shank Racing with Curb-Agajanian**	**(United States) John Pew (Brazil) Oswaldo Negri Jr.**	**Ligier JS P2**	C	**80**	**02:00:11.145‡**
1	**P**	**60**	**(United States) Michael Shank Racing with Curb-Agajanian**	**(United States) John Pew (Brazil) Oswaldo Negri Jr.**	**Honda HR35TT 3.5 Turbo V6**	C	**80**	**02:00:11.145‡**
2	P	90	(United States) VisitFlorida Racing	(Belgium) Marc Goossens (United Kingdom) Ryan Dalziel	Corvette Daytona Prototype	C	80	+30.099
2	P	90	(United States) VisitFlorida Racing	(Belgium) Marc Goossens (United Kingdom) Ryan Dalziel	Chevrolet 5.5 L V8	C	80	+30.099
3	P	31	(United States) Action Express Racing	(United States) Eric Curran (United States) Dane Cameron	Corvette Daytona Prototype	C	80	+30.954
3	P	31	(United States) Action Express Racing	(United States) Eric Curran (United States) Dane Cameron	Chevrolet 5.5 L V8	C	80	+30.954
4	P	55	(Japan) Mazda Motorsports	(United States) Jonathan Bomarito (United States) Tristan Nunez	Mazda Prototype	C	80	+1:03.035
4	P	55	(Japan) Mazda Motorsports	(United States) Jonathan Bomarito (United States) Tristan Nunez	Mazda MZ-2.0T 2.0 L I4 Turbo	C	80	+1:03.035
5	P	0	(United States) Panoz DeltaWing Racing	(United Kingdom) Katherine Legge (United States) Sean Rayhall	DeltaWing DWC13	C	80	+1:08.594
5	P	0	(United States) Panoz DeltaWing Racing	(United Kingdom) Katherine Legge (United States) Sean Rayhall	Élan (Mazda) 1.9 L I4 Turbo	C	80	+1:08.594
6	**GTLM**	**67**	**(United States) Ford Chip Ganassi Racing**	**(Australia) Ryan Briscoe (United Kingdom) Richard Westbrook**	**Ford GT**	M	**79**	**+1 Lap‡**
6	**GTLM**	**67**	**(United States) Ford Chip Ganassi Racing**	**(Australia) Ryan Briscoe (United Kingdom) Richard Westbrook**	**Ford EcoBoost 3.5 L Twin-turbo V6**	M	**79**	**+1 Lap‡**
7	GTLM	68	(United States) Scuderia Corsa	(Italy) Alessandro Pier Guidi (Brazil) Daniel Serra	Ferrari 488 GTE	M	79	+1 Lap
7	GTLM	68	(United States) Scuderia Corsa	(Italy) Alessandro Pier Guidi (Brazil) Daniel Serra	Ferrari F154CB 3.9 L Turbo V8	M	79	+1 Lap
8	P	10	(United States) Wayne Taylor Racing	(United States) Jordan Taylor (United States) Ricky Taylor	Corvette Daytona Prototype	C	78	+2 Laps
8	P	10	(United States) Wayne Taylor Racing	(United States) Jordan Taylor (United States) Ricky Taylor	Chevrolet 5.5 L V8	C	78	+2 Laps
9	GTLM	912	(United States) Porsche North America	(New Zealand) Earl Bamber (France) Frédéric Makowiecki	Porsche 911 RSR	M	78	+2 Laps
9	GTLM	912	(United States) Porsche North America	(New Zealand) Earl Bamber (France) Frédéric Makowiecki	Porsche 4.0 L Flat-6	M	78	+2 Laps
10	GTLM	3	(United States) Corvette Racing	(Spain) Antonio García (Denmark) Jan Magnussen	Chevrolet Corvette C7.R	M	78	+2 Laps
10	GTLM	3	(United States) Corvette Racing	(Spain) Antonio García (Denmark) Jan Magnussen	Chevrolet LT5.5 5.5 L V8	M	78	+2 Laps
11	GTLM	62	(United States) Risi Competizione	(Finland) Toni Vilander (Italy) Giancarlo Fisichella	Ferrari 488 GTE	M	78	+2 Laps
11	GTLM	62	(United States) Risi Competizione	(Finland) Toni Vilander (Italy) Giancarlo Fisichella	Ferrari F154CB 3.9 L Turbo V8	M	78	+2 Laps
12	GTLM	66	(United States) Ford Chip Ganassi Racing	(Germany) Dirk Müller (United States) Joey Hand	Ford GT	M	78	+2 Laps
12	GTLM	66	(United States) Ford Chip Ganassi Racing	(Germany) Dirk Müller (United States) Joey Hand	Ford EcoBoost 3.5 L Twin-turbo V6	M	78	+2 Laps
13	GTLM	4	(United States) Corvette Racing	(United Kingdom) Oliver Gavin (United States) Tommy Milner	Chevrolet Corvette C7.R	M	78	+2 Laps
13	GTLM	4	(United States) Corvette Racing	(United Kingdom) Oliver Gavin (United States) Tommy Milner	Chevrolet LT5.5 5.5 L V8	M	78	+2 Laps
14	GTLM	911	(United States) Porsche North America	(France) Patrick Pilet (United Kingdom) Nick Tandy	Porsche 911 RSR	M	78	+2 Laps
14	GTLM	911	(United States) Porsche North America	(France) Patrick Pilet (United Kingdom) Nick Tandy	Porsche 4.0 L Flat-6	M	78	+2 Laps
15	GTLM	25	(United States) BMW Team RLL	(United States) Bill Auberlen (Germany) Dirk Werner	BMW M6 GTLM	M	78	+2 Laps
15	GTLM	25	(United States) BMW Team RLL	(United States) Bill Auberlen (Germany) Dirk Werner	BMW 4.4 L Turbo V8	M	78	+2 Laps
16	GTLM	100	(United States) BMW Team RLL	(United States) John Edwards (Germany) Lucas Luhr	BMW M6 GTLM	M	78	+2 Laps
16	GTLM	100	(United States) BMW Team RLL	(United States) John Edwards (Germany) Lucas Luhr	BMW 4.4 L Turbo V8	M	78	+2 Laps
17	P	5	(United States) Action Express Racing	(Portugal) João Barbosa (Brazil) Christian Fittipaldi	Corvette Daytona Prototype	C	76	+4 Laps
17	P	5	(United States) Action Express Racing	(Portugal) João Barbosa (Brazil) Christian Fittipaldi	Chevrolet 5.5 L V8	C	76	+4 Laps
18 DNF	P	70	(Japan) Mazda Motorsports	(United States) Tom Long (United States) Joel Miller	Mazda Prototype	C	34	Oil Pump
18 DNF	P	70	(Japan) Mazda Motorsports	(United States) Tom Long (United States) Joel Miller	Mazda MZ-2.0T 2.0 L I4 Turbo	C	34	Oil Pump

Tyre manufacturers
Key
Symbol	Tyre manufacturer
**C**	Continental
**M**	Michelin

=== Race 2 ===
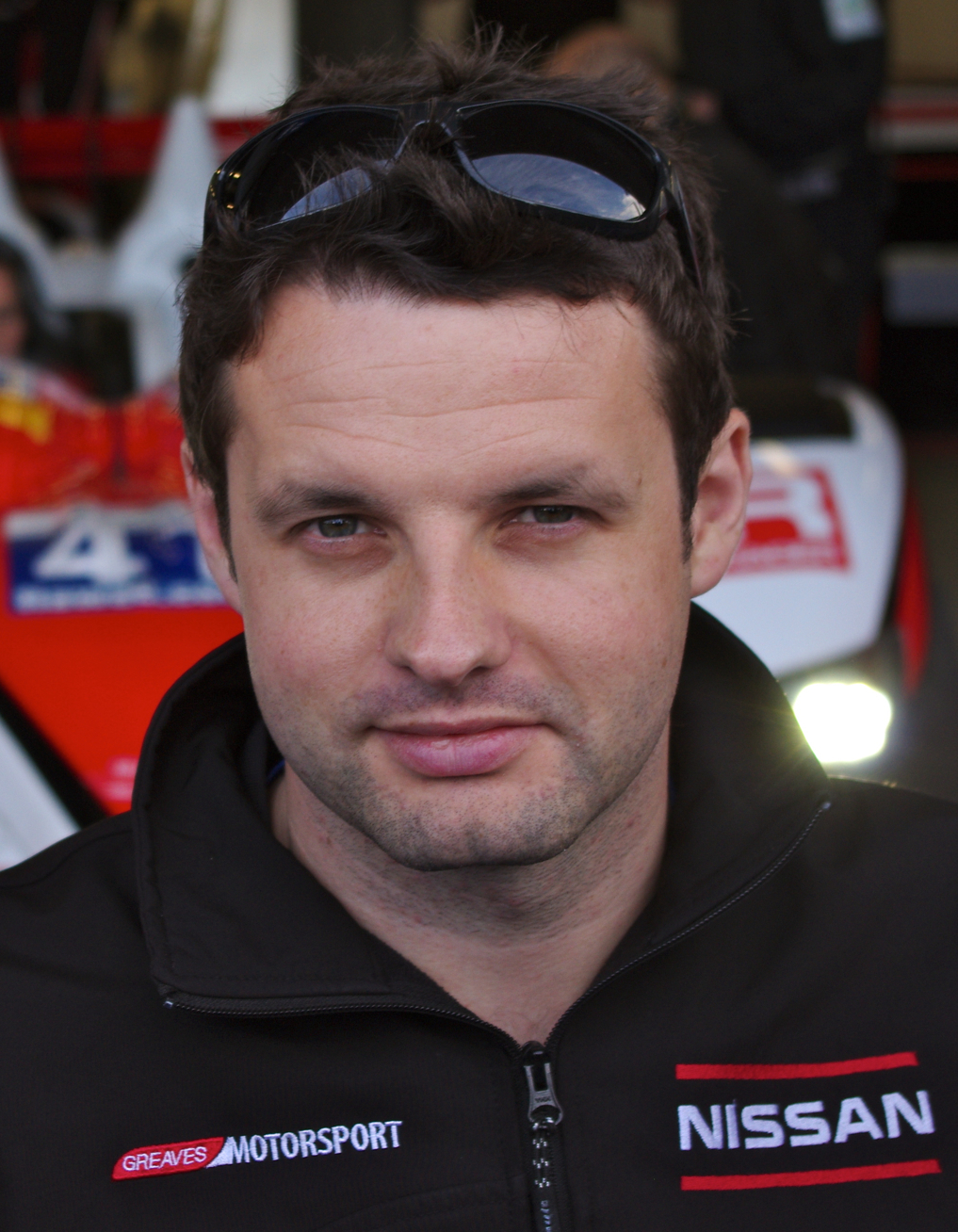
Tom Kimber-Smith (pictured in 2013) secured PR1/Mathiasen Motorsports' first victory of the season in the second race.

The No. 44 Magnus Racing Audi R8 LMS of John Potter and Andy Lally caught fire during the warm-up and was in the pit lane to serve a drive-through penalty after their car did not make it to the grid in time. Alon maintained his pole position advantage over French to hold the lead on the approach to turn one. Nielsen attempted to pass Riberas for the lead in GTD, but was unsuccessful. French overtook Alon to take the overall lead on lap 4. Sbirrazzuoli's Dream Racing Lamborghini suffered suspension damage making contact with Kvamme's No. 88 Starworks Oreca. On lap 36, the only full course yellow was given. Tim Pappas, driving the No. 540 Black Swan Porsche spun at turn five and got stuck in the gravel trap. Under caution, majority of the field made pit stops for fuel, tires, and driver changes. Renger van der Zande's No. 8 Starworks car took the overall lead following pit stops for the Prototype Challenge class. Farnbacher kept the No. 23 Porsche's lead in GTD with Balzan in second.

van der Zande led the restart on lap 41. On that lap, Tom Kimber-Smith overtook van der Zande at turn one for the overall lead. One lap later, Simpson moved the JDC-Miller MotorSports Oreca into second position. van der Zande re-overtook Simpson for second. Colin Braun moved the CORE Autosport car to fourth overall by passing Kyle Marcelli on the approach to turn five on lap 78. 3 laps later, Braun passed Simpson for third in PC. Klingmann's No. 96 BMW was caught by Davison's TGR Aston Martin on the final lap, who took third position in GTD at turn 9. Liddell's No. 6 Stevenson Audi passed Klingmann to finish fourth in the class. Kimber-Smith maintained the lead for the rest of the race winning after completing 82 laps. van der Zande finished second, 1.736 seconds behind the PR1/Mathiasen Motorsports car, and Braun completed the podium positions by finishing third in Prototype Challenge. The No. 23 AJR Porsche of Farnbacher and Riberas secured victory in GTD by 3.632 seconds ahead of the No. 63 Ferrari of Balzan and Nielsen in second. TGR's Brandon Davis and James Davison completed the GTD podium in third.

=== Race results ===
Class winners are denoted in bold and ‡. PC stands for Prototype Challenge and GTD (Grand Touring Daytona).

Final race classification
Pos	Class	No.	Team	Drivers	Chassis	Tire	Laps	Time/Retired
Pos	Class	No.	Team	Drivers	Engine	Tire	Laps	Time/Retired
1	**PC**	**52**	**(United States) PR1/Mathiasen Motorsports**	**(United States) Robert Alon (United Kingdom) Tom Kimber-Smith**	**Oreca FLM09**	C	**82**	**02:00:31.047‡**
1	**PC**	**52**	**(United States) PR1/Mathiasen Motorsports**	**(United States) Robert Alon (United Kingdom) Tom Kimber-Smith**	**Chevrolet 6.2 L V8**	C	**82**	**02:00:31.047‡**
2	PC	8	(United States) Starworks Motorsport	(Venezuela) Alex Popow (Netherlands) Renger van der Zande	Oreca FLM09	C	82	+1.736
2	PC	8	(United States) Starworks Motorsport	(Venezuela) Alex Popow (Netherlands) Renger van der Zande	Chevrolet 6.2 L V8	C	82	+1.736
3	PC	54	(United States) CORE Autosport	(United States) Jon Bennett (United States) Colin Braun	Oreca FLM09	C	82	+15.483
3	PC	54	(United States) CORE Autosport	(United States) Jon Bennett (United States) Colin Braun	Chevrolet 6.2 L V8	C	82	+15.483
4	PC	38	(United States) Performance Tech Motorsports	(United States) James French (Canada) Kyle Marcelli	Oreca FLM09	C	82	+21.661
4	PC	38	(United States) Performance Tech Motorsports	(United States) James French (Canada) Kyle Marcelli	Chevrolet 6.2 L V8	C	82	+21.661
5	PC	85	(United States) JDC-Miller MotorSports	(Canada) Misha Goikhberg (South Africa) Stephen Simpson	Oreca FLM09	C	82	+24.067
5	PC	85	(United States) JDC-Miller MotorSports	(Canada) Misha Goikhberg (South Africa) Stephen Simpson	Chevrolet 6.2 L V8	C	82	+24.067
6	PC	20	(United States) BAR1 Motorsports	(United States) Matt McMurry (United Kingdom) Johnny Mowlem	Oreca FLM09	C	81	+1 Lap
6	PC	20	(United States) BAR1 Motorsports	(United States) Matt McMurry (United Kingdom) Johnny Mowlem	Chevrolet 6.2 L V8	C	81	+1 Lap
7	PC	88	(United States) Starworks Motorsport	(United States) Mark Kvamme (United States) Ashley Freiberg	Oreca FLM09	C	80	+2 Laps
7	PC	88	(United States) Starworks Motorsport	(United States) Mark Kvamme (United States) Ashley Freiberg	Chevrolet 6.2 L V8	C	80	+2 Laps
8	**GTD**	**23**	**(United States) Team Seattle/Alex Job Racing**	**(Germany) Mario Farnbacher (Spain) Alex Riberas**	**Porsche 911 GT3 R**	C	**79**	**+3 Laps‡**
8	**GTD**	**23**	**(United States) Team Seattle/Alex Job Racing**	**(Germany) Mario Farnbacher (Spain) Alex Riberas**	**Porsche 4.0 L Flat-6**	C	**79**	**+3 Laps‡**
9	GTD	63	(United States) Scuderia Corsa	(Denmark) Christina Nielsen (Italy) Alessandro Balzan	Ferrari 488 GT3	C	79	+3 Laps
9	GTD	63	(United States) Scuderia Corsa	(Denmark) Christina Nielsen (Italy) Alessandro Balzan	Ferrari F154CB 3.9 L Turbo V8	C	79	+3 Laps
10	GTD	007	(United States) TRG-AMR	(United States) Brandon Davis (Australia) James Davison	Aston Martin Vantage GT3	C	79	+3 Laps
10	GTD	007	(United States) TRG-AMR	(United States) Brandon Davis (Australia) James Davison	Aston Martin 6.0 L V12	C	79	+3 Laps
11	GTD	6	(United States) Stevenson Motorsports	(United States) Andrew Davis (United Kingdom) Robin Liddell	Audi R8 LMS	C	79	+3 Laps
11	GTD	6	(United States) Stevenson Motorsports	(United States) Andrew Davis (United Kingdom) Robin Liddell	Audi 5.2L V10	C	79	+3 Laps
12	GTD	96	(United States) Turner Motorsport	(United States) Bret Curtis (Germany) Jens Klingmann	BMW M6 GT3	C	79	+3 Laps
12	GTD	96	(United States) Turner Motorsport	(United States) Bret Curtis (Germany) Jens Klingmann	BMW 4.4L Turbo V8	C	79	+3 Laps
13	GTD	33	(United States) Riley Motorsports	(Netherlands) Jeroen Bleekemolen (United States) Ben Keating	Dodge Viper GT3-R	C	79	+3 Laps
13	GTD	33	(United States) Riley Motorsports	(Netherlands) Jeroen Bleekemolen (United States) Ben Keating	Dodge 8.3L V10	C	79	+3 Laps
14	GTD	48	(United States) Paul Miller Racing	(United States) Bryan Sellers (United States) Madison Snow	Lamborghini Huracán GT3	C	79	+3 Laps
14	GTD	48	(United States) Paul Miller Racing	(United States) Bryan Sellers (United States) Madison Snow	Lamborghini 5.2 L V10	C	79	+3 Laps
15	GTD	22	(United States) Alex Job Racing	(United States) Cooper MacNeil (United States) Leh Keen	Porsche 911 GT3 R	C	79	+3 Laps
15	GTD	22	(United States) Alex Job Racing	(United States) Cooper MacNeil (United States) Leh Keen	Porsche 4.0 L Flat-6	C	79	+3 Laps
16	GTD	9	(United States) Stevenson Motorsports	(United States) Lawson Aschenbach (United States) Matt Bell	Audi R8 LMS	C	79	+3 Laps
16	GTD	9	(United States) Stevenson Motorsports	(United States) Lawson Aschenbach (United States) Matt Bell	Audi 5.2L V10	C	79	+3 Laps
17	GTD	16	(United States) Change Racing	(United States) Corey Lewis (United States) Spencer Pumpelly	Lamborghini Huracán GT3	C	79	+3 Laps
17	GTD	16	(United States) Change Racing	(United States) Corey Lewis (United States) Spencer Pumpelly	Lamborghini 5.2 L V10	C	79	+3 Laps
18	GTD	73	(United States) Park Place Motorsports	(Germany) Jörg Bergmeister (United States) Patrick Lindsey	Porsche 911 GT3 R	C	79	+3 Laps
18	GTD	73	(United States) Park Place Motorsports	(Germany) Jörg Bergmeister (United States) Patrick Lindsey	Porsche 4.0 L Flat-6	C	79	+3 Laps
19	GTD	97	(United States) Turner Motorsport	(United States) Michael Marsal (Finland) Markus Palttala	BMW M6 GT3	C	78	+4 Laps
19	GTD	97	(United States) Turner Motorsport	(United States) Michael Marsal (Finland) Markus Palttala	BMW 4.4L Turbo V8	C	78	+4 Laps
20	GTD	44	(United States) Magnus Racing	(United States) John Potter (United States) Andy Lally	Audi R8 LMS	C	78	+4 Laps
20	GTD	44	(United States) Magnus Racing	(United States) John Potter (United States) Andy Lally	Audi 5.2L V10	C	78	+4 Laps
21	GTD	80	(United States) Lone Star Racing	(United States) Dan Knox (United States) Mike Skeen	Dodge Viper GT3-R	C	78	+4 Laps
21	GTD	80	(United States) Lone Star Racing	(United States) Dan Knox (United States) Mike Skeen	Dodge 8.3L V10	C	78	+4 Laps
22 DNF	GTD	11	(United States) Change Racing	(United States) Bill Sweedler (United States) Townsend Bell	Lamborghini Huracán GT3	C	77	Out of Fuel
22 DNF	GTD	11	(United States) Change Racing	(United States) Bill Sweedler (United States) Townsend Bell	Lamborghini 5.2 L V10	C	77	Out of Fuel
23	GTD	27	(United States) Dream Racing	(Monaco) Cédric Sbirrazzuoli (United States) Lawrence DeGeorge	Lamborghini Huracán GT3	C	65	+17 Laps
23	GTD	27	(United States) Dream Racing	(Monaco) Cédric Sbirrazzuoli (United States) Lawrence DeGeorge	Lamborghini 5.2 L V10	C	65	+17 Laps
24	GTD	540	(United States) Black Swan Racing	(United States) Tim Pappas (Netherlands) Nicky Catsburg	Porsche 911 GT3 R	C	55	+27 Laps
24	GTD	540	(United States) Black Swan Racing	(United States) Tim Pappas (Netherlands) Nicky Catsburg	Porsche 4.0 L Flat-6	C	55	+27 Laps

Tyre manufacturer
Key
Symbol	Tyre manufacturer
**C**	Continental

== Post-race ==
With a total of 121 points, Cameron and Curran's second-place finish allowed them to take the lead of the Prototype Drivers' Championship. Goossens advanced from fourth to third. Goikhberg and Simpson continued to lead the Prototype Challenge Drivers' Championship with 128 points while Alon and Kimber-Smith advanced from third to second. The final results of GTLM meant Milner and Gavin continued to lead the Drivers' Championship, but their advantage was reduced by 6 points as Bamber and Makowiecki took over the second position. Briscoe and Westbrook advanced from seventh to third. With a total of 95 points, Balzan and Nielsen's second-place finish allowed them to take the lead of the GTD Drivers' Championship. Davis and Liddell advanced from eleventh to fifth while Lally and Potter dropped from first to third. Honda and Chevrolet continued to top their respective Manufacturers' Championships, while Porsche took the lead of the GTD Manufactures' Championship. Action Express Racing, JDC-Miller Motorsports, and Corvette Racing continued to top their respective Teams' Championships, while Scuderia Corsa took the lead of the GTD Teams' Championship with eight rounds left in the season.

== Championship standings after the race ==
Prototype Drivers' Championship standings
Pos.	+/–	Driver	Points
1	1	(United States) Eric Curran (United States) Dane Cameron	121
2	1	(Portugal) João Barbosa (Brazil) Christian Fittipaldi	118
3	1	(Belgium) Marc Goossens	117
4	1	(United States) Jordan Taylor (United States) Ricky Taylor	115
5	2	(Brazil) Oswaldo Negri Jr. (United States) John Pew	107

PC Drivers' Championship standings
Pos.	+/–	Driver	Points
1		(South Africa) Stephen Simpson (Canada) Misha Goikhberg	128
2	1	(United States) Robert Alon (United Kingdom) Tom Kimber-Smith	128
3	1	(Venezuela) Alex Popow (Netherlands) Renger van der Zande	126
4		(United Kingdom) Johnny Mowlem	112
5	2	(United States) Jon Bennett (United States) Colin Braun	93

GTLM Drivers' Championship standings
Pos.	+/–	Driver	Points
1		(United Kingdom) Oliver Gavin (United States) Tommy Milner	130
2		(New Zealand) Earl Bamber (France) Frédéric Makowiecki	118
3	4	(Australia) Ryan Briscoe (United Kingdom) Richard Westbrook	115
4	2	(Brazil) Daniel Serra	113
5	1	(Italy) Giancarlo Fisichella (Finland) Toni Vilander	113

GTD Drivers' Championship standings
Pos.	+/–	Driver	Points
1	1	(Italy) Alessandro Balzan (Denmark) Christina Nielsen	95
2	1	(Germany) Mario Farnbacher (Spain) Alex Riberas	89
3	2	(United States) Andy Lally (United States) John Potter	86
4	1	(United States) Michael Marsal (Finland) Markus Palttala	72
5	6	(United States) Andrew Davis (United Kingdom) Robin Liddell	71

- Note: Only the top five positions are included for all sets of standings.

Prototype Teams' Championship standings
Pos.	+/–	Team	Points
1	1	(United States) No. 31 Action Express Racing	121
2	1	(United States) No. 5 Action Express Racing	118
3	2	(United States) No. 90 VisitFlorida Racing	117
4	1	(United States) No. 10 Wayne Taylor Racing	115
5	3	(United States) #60 Michael Shank Racing with Curb-Agajanian	107

PC Teams' Championship standings
Pos.	+/–	Team	Points
1		(United States) No. 85 JDC-Miller MotorSports	128
2	1	(United States) No. 52 PR1/Mathiasen Motorsports	128
3	1	(United States) No. 8 Starworks Motorsport	126
4	1	(United States) No. 54 CORE Autosport	116
5	1	(United States) No. 38 Performance Tech Motorsports	113

GTLM Teams' Championship standings
Pos.	+/–	Team	Points
1		(United States) No. 4 Corvette Racing	130
2	1	(United States) No. 912 Porsche North America	118
3	5	(United States) No. 67 Ford Chip Ganassi Racing	115
4	2	(United States) No. 68 Scuderia Corsa	113
5	1	(United States) No. 62 Risi Competizione	113

GTD Teams' Championship standings
Pos.	+/–	Team	Points
1	1	(United States) No. 63 Scuderia Corsa	95
2	1	(United States) No. 23 Team Seattle/Alex Job Racing	89
3	2	(United States) No. 44 Magnus Racing	86
4	1	(United States) No. 97 Turner Motorsport	72
5	7	(United States) No. 6 Stevenson Motorsports	71

- Note: Only the top five positions are included for all sets of standings.

Prototype Manufacturers' Championship standings
Pos.	+/–	Manufacturer	Points
1		(Japan) Honda	135
2		(United States) Chevrolet	131
3		(Japan) Mazda	118
4		(Germany) BMW	56
5		(United States) Ford	30

GTLM Manufacturers' Championship standings
Pos.	+/–	Manufacturer	Points
1		(United States) Chevrolet	130
2		(Germany) Porsche	127
3		(Italy) Ferrari	120
4	1	(United States) Ford	115
5	1	(Germany) BMW	112

GTD Manufacturers' Championship standings
Pos.	+/–	Manufacturer	Points
1	2	(Germany) Porsche	95
2	1	(Germany) Audi	93
3	1	(Italy) Ferrari	92
4		(Germany) BMW	84
5	1	(United Kingdom) Aston Martin	83

- Note: Only the top five positions are included for all sets of standings.

IMSA SportsCar Championship
Previous race: Tequila Patrón Sports Car Showcase	2016 season	Next race: Chevrolet Sports Car Classic
