= 2016 IMSA SportsCar Championship =

46th season of the racing series organized by IMSA

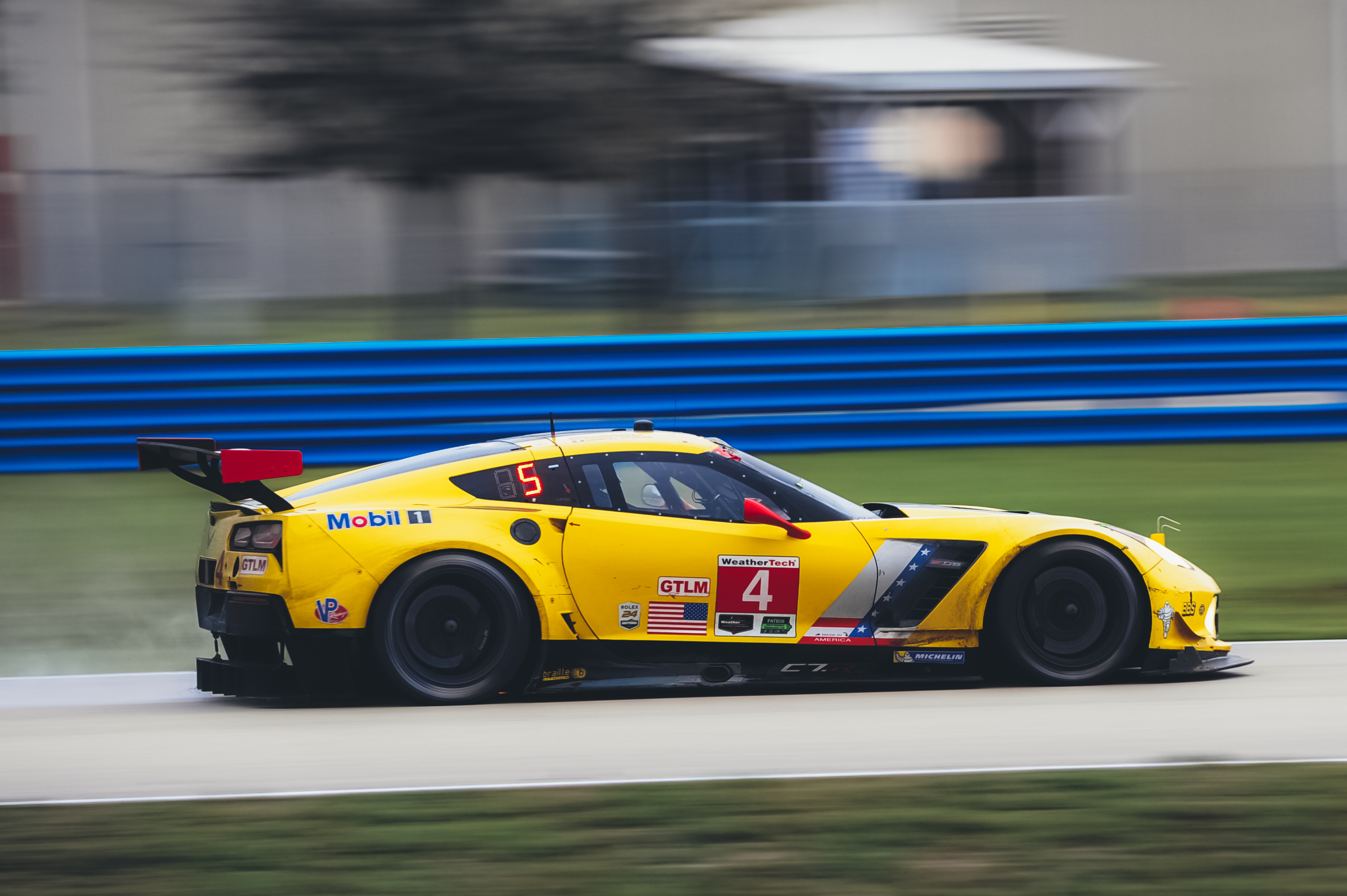
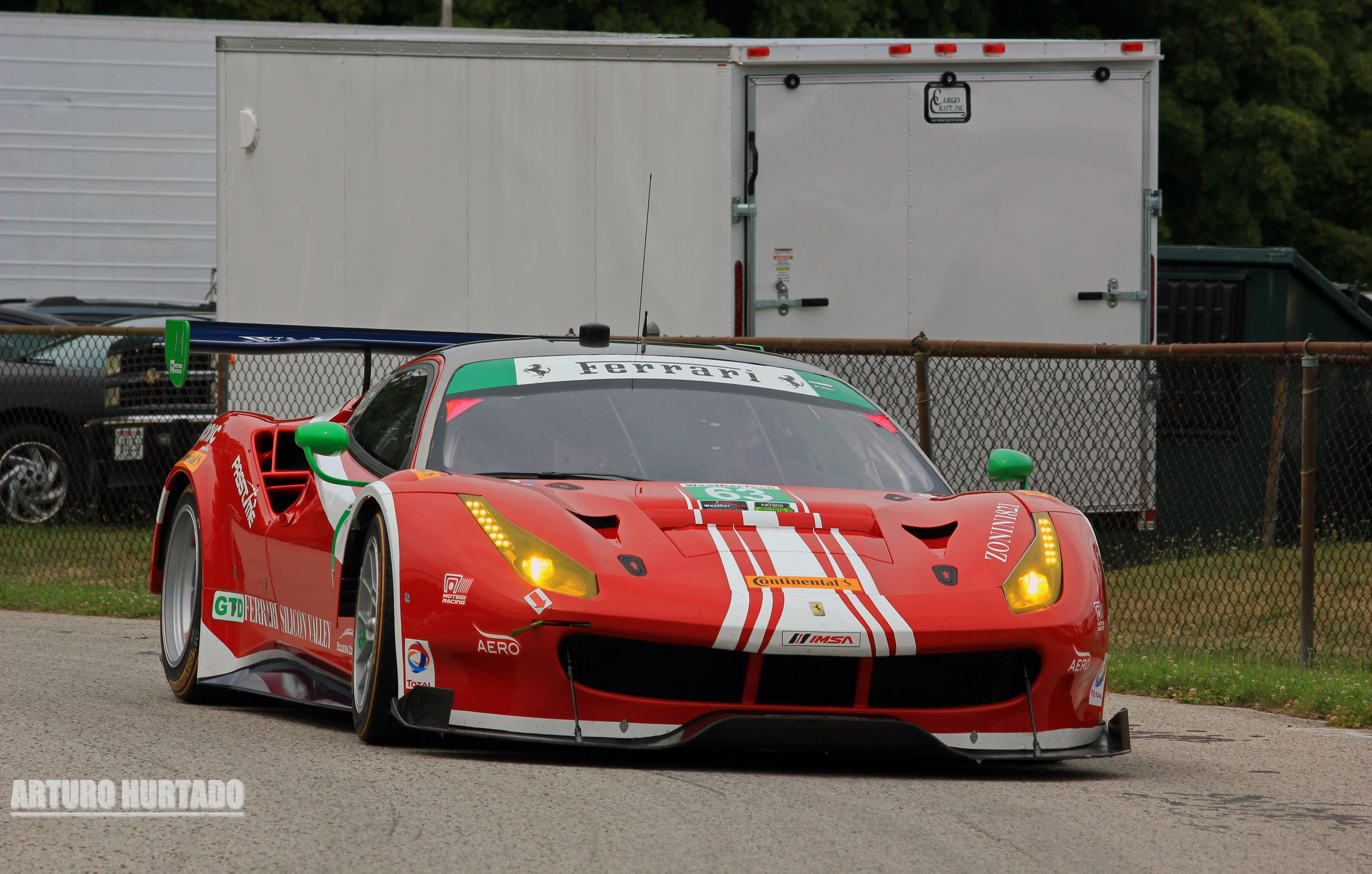
The No. 4 Corvette Racing won the GT Le Mans Teams' and Drivers' championships, with Chevrolet in the GT Le Mans Manufacturers' Championship.
The No. 63 Scuderia Corsa won the GT Daytona Teams' and Drivers' championships, while Audi took the GT Daytona Manufacturers' Championship.

The 2016 IMSA SportsCar Championship (known for sponsorship reasons as the 2016 IMSA WeatherTech SportsCar Championship) was the third season of the United SportsCar Championship and first to be under the name as the IMSA SportsCar Championship organized by the International Motor Sports Association (IMSA). It was the 46th season of IMSA-sanctioned GT Championship sportscar racing tracing its lineage to the 1971 IMSA Camel GT season. It began on January 30 with the 24 Hours of Daytona and ended on October 1 at Petit Le Mans.

== Classes ==
The class structure remained largely unchanged from 2015, with the major change coming in GTD which was now run full GT3 spec machinery.

- Prototype (P) (DP and LMP2)
- Prototype Challenge (PC)
- GT Le Mans (GTLM)
- GT Daytona (GTD)

== Schedule ==
=== Race schedule ===
The 2016 schedule was released on August 8, 2015 and featured twelve rounds.

There were also two test sessions before the beginning of the season. They were held on November 17–18 at Daytona International Speedway, as well as The Roar Before the 24, also at Daytona, January 8–10.

Race is part of the North American Endurance Cup

Rnd	Race	Length	Classes	Circuit	Location	Date
1	Rolex 24 at Daytona	24 hours	All	Daytona International Speedway	Daytona Beach, Florida	January 30–31
2	Mobil 1 Twelve Hours of Sebring	12 hours	All	Sebring International Raceway	Sebring, Florida	March 19
3	BUBBA Burger Sports Car Grand Prix at Long Beach	1 hour 40 minutes	P, PC, GTLM	Long Beach Street Circuit	Long Beach, California	April 16
4	Continental Tire Monterey Grand Prix	2 hours	P, GTLM	Mazda Raceway Laguna Seca	Monterey, California	May 1
4	Continental Tire Monterey Grand Prix	2 hours	PC, GTD	Mazda Raceway Laguna Seca	Monterey, California	May 1
5	Chevrolet Sports Car Classic	1 hour 40 minutes	P, PC, GTD	The Raceway on Belle Isle	Detroit, Michigan	June 4
6	Sahlen's Six Hours of The Glen	6 hours	All	Watkins Glen International	Watkins Glen, New York	July 3
7	Mobil 1 SportsCar Grand Prix	2 hours 40 minutes	All	Canadian Tire Motorsport Park	Bowmanville, Ontario	July 10
8	Northeast Grand Prix	2 hours 40 minutes	PC, GTLM, GTD	Lime Rock Park	Lakeville, Connecticut	July 23
9	Continental Tire Road Race Showcase	2 hours 40 minutes	All	Road America	Elkhart Lake, Wisconsin	August 7
10	Michelin GT Challenge	2 hours 40 minutes	GTLM, GTD	Virginia International Raceway	Alton, Virginia	August 28
11	Lone Star Le Mans	2 hours 40 minutes	All	Circuit of the Americas	Austin, Texas	September 17
12	Petit Le Mans presented by Harrah's Cherokee	10 hours	All	Road Atlanta	Braselton, Georgia	October 1

NOTE: Because of a high car count for the Mazda Raceway event, there will be two separate two-hour races with two categories racing in each race.

=== Calendar changes ===
- PC has been added to the lineup at Long Beach.
- GTD has been added to the lineup at the Mobil 1 SportsCar Grand Prix, having the race feature all four classes.
- The round at Mazda Raceway Laguna Seca will return to a split race format because of field size.
- GTLM will join PC and GTD at Lime Rock Park.

== Entries ==
=== Prototype ===
Team	Chassis	Engine	No.	Drivers	Rounds
(United States) Panoz DeltaWing Racing	DeltaWing DWC13	Élan (Mazda) 1.9 L Turbo I4	0	(United Kingdom) Katherine Legge	1–4, 6–7, 9, 11–12
(United States) Panoz DeltaWing Racing	DeltaWing DWC13	Élan (Mazda) 1.9 L Turbo I4	0	(United Kingdom) Andy Meyrick	1–3, 12
(United States) Panoz DeltaWing Racing	DeltaWing DWC13	Élan (Mazda) 1.9 L Turbo I4	0	(United States) Sean Rayhall	1–2, 4, 6–7, 9, 11–12
(United States) Panoz DeltaWing Racing	DeltaWing DWC13	Élan (Mazda) 1.9 L Turbo I4	0	(Germany) Andreas Wirth	1
(United States) Panoz DeltaWing Racing	DeltaWing DWC13	Élan (Mazda) 1.9 L Turbo I4	0	(Colombia) Gabby Chaves	6
(United States) Tequila Patrón ESM	Ligier JS P2	Honda HR35TT 3.5 L Turbo V6	2	(Brazil) Pipo Derani	1–2, 6, 12
(United States) Tequila Patrón ESM	Ligier JS P2	Honda HR35TT 3.5 L Turbo V6	2	(United States) Scott Sharp	1–2, 6, 12
(United States) Tequila Patrón ESM	Ligier JS P2	Honda HR35TT 3.5 L Turbo V6	2	(United States) Johannes van Overbeek	1–2, 6, 12
(United States) Tequila Patrón ESM	Ligier JS P2	Honda HR35TT 3.5 L Turbo V6	2	(United States) Ed Brown	1–2
(United States) Action Express Racing	Coyote Corvette DP	Chevrolet 5.5 L V8	5	(Portugal) João Barbosa	All
(United States) Action Express Racing	Coyote Corvette DP	Chevrolet 5.5 L V8	5	(Brazil) Christian Fittipaldi	All
(United States) Action Express Racing	Coyote Corvette DP	Chevrolet 5.5 L V8	5	(Portugal) Filipe Albuquerque	1–2, 6, 12
(United States) Action Express Racing	Coyote Corvette DP	Chevrolet 5.5 L V8	5	(United States) Scott Pruett	1–2
(United States) Action Express Racing	Coyote Corvette DP	Chevrolet 5.5 L V8	31	(United States) Dane Cameron	All
(United States) Action Express Racing	Coyote Corvette DP	Chevrolet 5.5 L V8	31	(United States) Eric Curran	All
(United States) Action Express Racing	Coyote Corvette DP	Chevrolet 5.5 L V8	31	(France) Simon Pagenaud	1, 12
(United States) Action Express Racing	Coyote Corvette DP	Chevrolet 5.5 L V8	31	(United Kingdom) Jonathan Adam	1
(United States) Action Express Racing	Coyote Corvette DP	Chevrolet 5.5 L V8	31	(United States) Scott Pruett	2
(United States) Action Express Racing	Coyote Corvette DP	Chevrolet 5.5 L V8	31	(Portugal) Filipe Albuquerque	6
(United States) Wayne Taylor Racing	Dallara Corvette DP	Chevrolet 5.5 L V8	10	(United States) Jordan Taylor	All
(United States) Wayne Taylor Racing	Dallara Corvette DP	Chevrolet 5.5 L V8	10	(United States) Ricky Taylor	All
(United States) Wayne Taylor Racing	Dallara Corvette DP	Chevrolet 5.5 L V8	10	(Italy) Max Angelelli	1–2, 6, 12
(United States) Wayne Taylor Racing	Dallara Corvette DP	Chevrolet 5.5 L V8	10	(Brazil) Rubens Barrichello	1–2
(United States) Alegra Motorsports	Riley Mk XXVI DP	Dinan (BMW) 5.0 L V8	24	(Germany) Dominik Farnbacher	2
(United States) Alegra Motorsports	Riley Mk XXVI DP	Dinan (BMW) 5.0 L V8	24	(United States) Cameron Lawrence	2
(United States) Alegra Motorsports	Riley Mk XXVI DP	Dinan (BMW) 5.0 L V8	24	(Canada) Daniel Morad	2
(United States) Alegra Motorsports	Riley Mk XXVI DP	Dinan (BMW) 5.0 L V8	24	(United States) Carlos de Quesada	2
(Russia) SMP Racing	BR Engineering BR01	Nissan VK45DE 4.5 L V8	37	(Russia) Mikhail Aleshin	1
(Russia) SMP Racing	BR Engineering BR01	Nissan VK45DE 4.5 L V8	37	(Russia) Kirill Ladygin	1
(Russia) SMP Racing	BR Engineering BR01	Nissan VK45DE 4.5 L V8	37	(Italy) Maurizio Mediani	1
(Russia) SMP Racing	BR Engineering BR01	Nissan VK45DE 4.5 L V8	37	(France) Nicolas Minassian	1
(United States) Fifty Plus Racing (Highway to Help)	Riley Mk XXVI DP	Dinan (BMW) 5.0 L V8	50	(United States) Byron DeFoor	1–2, 6
(United States) Fifty Plus Racing (Highway to Help)	Riley Mk XXVI DP	Dinan (BMW) 5.0 L V8	50	(United States) Jim Pace	1–2, 6
(United States) Fifty Plus Racing (Highway to Help)	Riley Mk XXVI DP	Dinan (BMW) 5.0 L V8	50	(United States) Dorsey Schroeder	1–2, 6
(United States) Fifty Plus Racing (Highway to Help)	Riley Mk XXVI DP	Dinan (BMW) 5.0 L V8	50	(United Kingdom) David Hinton	1–2
(United States) Fifty Plus Racing (Highway to Help)	Riley Mk XXVI DP	Dinan (BMW) 5.0 L V8	50	(Austria) Thomas Gruber	1
(Japan) Mazda Motorsports	Lola B12/80 Mazda	Mazda MZ-2.0T 2.0 L Turbo I4	55	(United States) Jonathan Bomarito	All
(Japan) Mazda Motorsports	Lola B12/80 Mazda	Mazda MZ-2.0T 2.0 L Turbo I4	55	(United States) Tristan Nunez	All
(Japan) Mazda Motorsports	Lola B12/80 Mazda	Mazda MZ-2.0T 2.0 L Turbo I4	55	(United States) Spencer Pigot	1–2, 6, 12
(Japan) Mazda Motorsports	Lola B12/80 Mazda	Mazda MZ-2.0T 2.0 L Turbo I4	70	(United States) Tom Long	All
(Japan) Mazda Motorsports	Lola B12/80 Mazda	Mazda MZ-2.0T 2.0 L Turbo I4	70	(United States) Joel Miller	All
(Japan) Mazda Motorsports	Lola B12/80 Mazda	Mazda MZ-2.0T 2.0 L Turbo I4	70	(United Kingdom) Ben Devlin	1–2, 6
(Japan) Mazda Motorsports	Lola B12/80 Mazda	Mazda MZ-2.0T 2.0 L Turbo I4	70	(Japan) Keiko Ihara	2
(Japan) Mazda Motorsports	Lola B12/80 Mazda	Mazda MZ-2.0T 2.0 L Turbo I4	70	(United States) Spencer Pigot	12
(United States) Michael Shank Racing with Curb-Agajanian	Ligier JS P2	Honda HR35TT 3.5 L Turbo V6	60	(Brazil) Oswaldo Negri Jr.	All
(United States) Michael Shank Racing with Curb-Agajanian	Ligier JS P2	Honda HR35TT 3.5 L Turbo V6	60	(United States) John Pew	1–4, 6–7, 9, 11–12
(United States) Michael Shank Racing with Curb-Agajanian	Ligier JS P2	Honda HR35TT 3.5 L Turbo V6	60	(France) Olivier Pla	1–2, 6, 12
(United States) Michael Shank Racing with Curb-Agajanian	Ligier JS P2	Honda HR35TT 3.5 L Turbo V6	60	(United States) A. J. Allmendinger	1
(United States) Michael Shank Racing with Curb-Agajanian	Ligier JS P2	Honda HR35TT 3.5 L Turbo V6	60	(United Kingdom) Katherine Legge	5
(United States) DragonSpeed	Oreca 05	Nissan VK45DE 4.5 L V8	81	(Sweden) Henrik Hedman	2
(United States) DragonSpeed	Oreca 05	Nissan VK45DE 4.5 L V8	81	(France) Nicolas Lapierre	2
(United States) DragonSpeed	Oreca 05	Nissan VK45DE 4.5 L V8	81	(France) Nicolas Minassian	2
(United States) VisitFlorida Racing	Coyote Corvette DP	Chevrolet 5.5 L V8	90	(Belgium) Marc Goossens	All
(United States) VisitFlorida Racing	Coyote Corvette DP	Chevrolet 5.5 L V8	90	(United Kingdom) Ryan Dalziel	1–2, 4–7, 9, 11–12
(United States) VisitFlorida Racing	Coyote Corvette DP	Chevrolet 5.5 L V8	90	(United States) Ryan Hunter-Reay	1–3, 12
(United States) Ford Chip Ganassi Racing	Ford EcoBoost Riley DP	Ford EcoBoost D35 3.5 L Turbo V6	01	(New Zealand) Brendon Hartley	1
(United States) Ford Chip Ganassi Racing	Ford EcoBoost Riley DP	Ford EcoBoost D35 3.5 L Turbo V6	01	(United Kingdom) Andy Priaulx	1
(United States) Ford Chip Ganassi Racing	Ford EcoBoost Riley DP	Ford EcoBoost D35 3.5 L Turbo V6	01	(Canada) Lance Stroll	1
(United States) Ford Chip Ganassi Racing	Ford EcoBoost Riley DP	Ford EcoBoost D35 3.5 L Turbo V6	01	(Austria) Alexander Wurz	1
(United States) Ford Chip Ganassi Racing	Ford EcoBoost Riley DP	Ford EcoBoost D35 3.5 L Turbo V6	02	(New Zealand) Scott Dixon	1
(United States) Ford Chip Ganassi Racing	Ford EcoBoost Riley DP	Ford EcoBoost D35 3.5 L Turbo V6	02	(Brazil) Tony Kanaan	1
(United States) Ford Chip Ganassi Racing	Ford EcoBoost Riley DP	Ford EcoBoost D35 3.5 L Turbo V6	02	(United States) Kyle Larson	1
(United States) Ford Chip Ganassi Racing	Ford EcoBoost Riley DP	Ford EcoBoost D35 3.5 L Turbo V6	02	(United States) Jamie McMurray	1

=== Prototype Challenge ===
All entries use an Oreca FLM09 chassis powered by a Chevrolet LS3 6.2 L V8.

Team	No.	Drivers	Rounds
(United States) Starworks Motorsport	7	(Mexico) José Gutiérrez	8–9, 11
(United States) Starworks Motorsport	7	(United States) Sean Rayhall	8
(United States) Starworks Motorsport	7	(Colombia) Gustavo Yacamán	9, 11
(United States) Starworks Motorsport	7	(Monaco) Stefano Coletti	12
(United States) Starworks Motorsport	7	(Canada) James Dayson	12
(United States) Starworks Motorsport	7	(United States) Quinlan Lall	12
(United States) Starworks Motorsport	8	(Venezuela) Alex Popow	All
(United States) Starworks Motorsport	8	(Netherlands) Renger van der Zande	All
(United States) Starworks Motorsport	8	(Canada) Chris Cumming	1
(United States) Starworks Motorsport	8	(United Kingdom) Jack Hawksworth	1
(United States) Starworks Motorsport	8	(Denmark) David Heinemeier Hansson	2, 12
(United States) Starworks Motorsport	88	(Germany) Maro Engel	1–2
(United States) Starworks Motorsport	88	(United States) Sean Johnston	1–2
(United States) Starworks Motorsport	88	(United States) Mark Kvamme	1, 3–9, 11–12
(United States) Starworks Motorsport	88	(Sweden) Felix Rosenqvist	1
(United States) Starworks Motorsport	88	(United Kingdom) Michael Lyons	2
(United States) Starworks Motorsport	88	(United States) Ashley Freiberg	3–5
(United States) Starworks Motorsport	88	(United Kingdom) Richard Bradley	6–7, 9, 11–12
(United States) Starworks Motorsport	88	(Canada) Remo Ruscitti	6, 8
(United States) Starworks Motorsport	88	(United States) Max Hanratty	12
(United States) BAR1 Motorsports	20	(United Kingdom) Johnny Mowlem	1–8, 12
(United States) BAR1 Motorsports	20	(United States) Marc Drumwright	1–2
(United States) BAR1 Motorsports	20	(United States) Tomy Drissi	1, 3, 5, 12
(United States) BAR1 Motorsports	20	(United States) Brendan Gaughan	1
(United States) BAR1 Motorsports	20	(Puerto Rico) Ricardo Vera	1
(United States) BAR1 Motorsports	20	(United States) Don Yount	2, 6, 12
(United States) BAR1 Motorsports	20	(United Kingdom) Ryan Lewis	2
(United States) BAR1 Motorsports	20	(United States) Matt McMurry	4, 6–9, 11
(United States) BAR1 Motorsports	20	(Brazil) Bruno Junqueira	9, 11
(United States) BAR1 Motorsports	26	(United States) Don Yount	1, 9, 11
(United States) BAR1 Motorsports	26	(United States) John Falb	1, 11
(United States) BAR1 Motorsports	26	(United States) Ryan Eversley	1
(United States) BAR1 Motorsports	26	(United Kingdom) Ryan Lewis	1
(United States) BAR1 Motorsports	26	(United States) Adam Merzon	1
(United States) BAR1 Motorsports	26	(United Kingdom) Johnny Mowlem	9
(United States) Performance Tech Motorsports	38	(United States) James French	All
(United States) Performance Tech Motorsports	38	(Canada) Kyle Marcelli	1–9, 12
(United States) Performance Tech Motorsports	38	(United States) Josh Norman	1–2
(United States) Performance Tech Motorsports	38	(United States) Brandon Gdovic	1
(United States) Performance Tech Motorsports	38	(United States) Jim Norman	1
(United States) Performance Tech Motorsports	38	(United States) Kenton Koch	6, 12
(United States) Performance Tech Motorsports	38	(United States) Nicholas Boulle	11
(United States) PR1/Mathiasen Motorsports	52	(United States) Robert Alon	All
(United States) PR1/Mathiasen Motorsports	52	(United Kingdom) Tom Kimber-Smith	All
(United States) PR1/Mathiasen Motorsports	52	(Mexico) José Gutiérrez	1–2, 6, 12
(United States) PR1/Mathiasen Motorsports	52	(United States) Nicholas Boulle	1
(United States) CORE Autosport	54	(United States) Jon Bennett	1–9
(United States) CORE Autosport	54	(United States) Colin Braun	1–9
(United States) CORE Autosport	54	(Canada) Mark Wilkins	1–2, 6
(United States) CORE Autosport	54	(United Kingdom) Martin Plowman	1
(United States) JDC-Miller MotorSports	85	(Canada) Mikhail Goikhberg	All
(United States) JDC-Miller MotorSports	85	(South Africa) Stephen Simpson	All
(United States) JDC-Miller MotorSports	85	(United States) Chris Miller	1–2, 6, 12
(United States) JDC-Miller MotorSports	85	(United States) Kenton Koch	1–2

=== GT Le Mans ===
Team	Chassis	Engine	No.	Drivers	Rounds
(United States) Corvette Racing	Chevrolet Corvette C7.R	Chevrolet LT5.5R 5.5 L V8	3	(Spain) Antonio García	All
(United States) Corvette Racing	Chevrolet Corvette C7.R	Chevrolet LT5.5R 5.5 L V8	3	(Denmark) Jan Magnussen	All
(United States) Corvette Racing	Chevrolet Corvette C7.R	Chevrolet LT5.5R 5.5 L V8	3	(Germany) Mike Rockenfeller	1–2, 12
(United States) Corvette Racing	Chevrolet Corvette C7.R	Chevrolet LT5.5R 5.5 L V8	4	(United Kingdom) Oliver Gavin	All
(United States) Corvette Racing	Chevrolet Corvette C7.R	Chevrolet LT5.5R 5.5 L V8	4	(United States) Tommy Milner	All
(United States) Corvette Racing	Chevrolet Corvette C7.R	Chevrolet LT5.5R 5.5 L V8	4	(Switzerland) Marcel Fässler	1–2, 12
(United States) BMW Team RLL	BMW M6 GTLM	BMW S63 4.4 L Turbo V8	25	(United States) Bill Auberlen	All
(United States) BMW Team RLL	BMW M6 GTLM	BMW S63 4.4 L Turbo V8	25	(Germany) Dirk Werner	All
(United States) BMW Team RLL	BMW M6 GTLM	BMW S63 4.4 L Turbo V8	25	(Canada) Bruno Spengler	1–2
(United States) BMW Team RLL	BMW M6 GTLM	BMW S63 4.4 L Turbo V8	25	(Brazil) Augusto Farfus	1, 12
(United States) BMW Team RLL	BMW M6 GTLM	BMW S63 4.4 L Turbo V8	100	(United States) John Edwards	All
(United States) BMW Team RLL	BMW M6 GTLM	BMW S63 4.4 L Turbo V8	100	(Germany) Lucas Luhr	All
(United States) BMW Team RLL	BMW M6 GTLM	BMW S63 4.4 L Turbo V8	100	(Canada) Kuno Wittmer	1–2, 12
(United States) BMW Team RLL	BMW M6 GTLM	BMW S63 4.4 L Turbo V8	100	(United States) Graham Rahal	1
(United States) Risi Competizione	Ferrari 488 GTE	Ferrari F154CB 4.0 L Turbo V8	62	(Italy) Giancarlo Fisichella	All
(United States) Risi Competizione	Ferrari 488 GTE	Ferrari F154CB 4.0 L Turbo V8	62	(Finland) Toni Vilander	All
(United States) Risi Competizione	Ferrari 488 GTE	Ferrari F154CB 4.0 L Turbo V8	62	(Italy) Davide Rigon	1–2
(United States) Risi Competizione	Ferrari 488 GTE	Ferrari F154CB 4.0 L Turbo V8	62	(Monaco) Olivier Beretta	1
(United States) Risi Competizione	Ferrari 488 GTE	Ferrari F154CB 4.0 L Turbo V8	62	(United Kingdom) James Calado	12
(United States) Ford Chip Ganassi Racing	Ford GT	Ford EcoBoost D35 3.5 L Turbo V6	66	(United States) Joey Hand	All
(United States) Ford Chip Ganassi Racing	Ford GT	Ford EcoBoost D35 3.5 L Turbo V6	66	(Germany) Dirk Müller	All
(United States) Ford Chip Ganassi Racing	Ford GT	Ford EcoBoost D35 3.5 L Turbo V6	66	(France) Sébastien Bourdais	1–2, 12
(United States) Ford Chip Ganassi Racing	Ford GT	Ford EcoBoost D35 3.5 L Turbo V6	67	(Australia) Ryan Briscoe	All
(United States) Ford Chip Ganassi Racing	Ford GT	Ford EcoBoost D35 3.5 L Turbo V6	67	(United Kingdom) Richard Westbrook	All
(United States) Ford Chip Ganassi Racing	Ford GT	Ford EcoBoost D35 3.5 L Turbo V6	67	(Germany) Stefan Mücke	1
(United States) Ford Chip Ganassi Racing	Ford GT	Ford EcoBoost D35 3.5 L Turbo V6	67	(New Zealand) Scott Dixon	2, 12
(United States) Scuderia Corsa	Ferrari 488 GTE	Ferrari F154CB 4.0 L Turbo V8	68	(Brazil) Daniel Serra	1–4, 6, 12
(United States) Scuderia Corsa	Ferrari 488 GTE	Ferrari F154CB 4.0 L Turbo V8	68	(Italy) Alessandro Pier Guidi	1–2, 4, 6, 12
(United States) Scuderia Corsa	Ferrari 488 GTE	Ferrari F154CB 4.0 L Turbo V8	68	(France) Alexandre Prémat	1
(United States) Scuderia Corsa	Ferrari 488 GTE	Ferrari F154CB 4.0 L Turbo V8	68	(Mexico) Memo Rojas	1
(United States) Scuderia Corsa	Ferrari 488 GTE	Ferrari F154CB 4.0 L Turbo V8	68	(Italy) Andrea Bertolini	2, 12
(United States) Scuderia Corsa	Ferrari 488 GTE	Ferrari F154CB 4.0 L Turbo V8	68	(Italy) Alessandro Balzan	3
(Russia) SMP Racing	Ferrari 488 GTE	Ferrari F154CB 4.0 L Turbo V8	72	(Italy) Andrea Bertolini	1
(Russia) SMP Racing	Ferrari 488 GTE	Ferrari F154CB 4.0 L Turbo V8	72	(Italy) Gianmaria Bruni	1
(Russia) SMP Racing	Ferrari 488 GTE	Ferrari F154CB 4.0 L Turbo V8	72	(United Kingdom) James Calado	1
(Russia) SMP Racing	Ferrari 488 GTE	Ferrari F154CB 4.0 L Turbo V8	72	(Russia) Viktor Shaitar	1
(United States) Porsche North America	Porsche 911 RSR	Porsche 4.0 L Flat-6	911	(France) Patrick Pilet	All
(United States) Porsche North America	Porsche 911 RSR	Porsche 4.0 L Flat-6	911	(United Kingdom) Nick Tandy	All
(United States) Porsche North America	Porsche 911 RSR	Porsche 4.0 L Flat-6	911	(France) Kévin Estre	1–2
(United States) Porsche North America	Porsche 911 RSR	Porsche 4.0 L Flat-6	911	(Austria) Richard Lietz	12
(United States) Porsche North America	Porsche 911 RSR	Porsche 4.0 L Flat-6	912	(New Zealand) Earl Bamber	All
(United States) Porsche North America	Porsche 911 RSR	Porsche 4.0 L Flat-6	912	(France) Frédéric Makowiecki	All
(United States) Porsche North America	Porsche 911 RSR	Porsche 4.0 L Flat-6	912	(Denmark) Michael Christensen	1–2, 12

=== GT Daytona ===
Team	Chassis	Engine	No.	Drivers	Rounds
(United States) Stevenson Motorsports	Audi R8 LMS	Audi DAR 5.2 L V10	6	(United States) Andrew Davis	All
(United States) Stevenson Motorsports	Audi R8 LMS	Audi DAR 5.2 L V10	6	(United Kingdom) Robin Liddell	All
(United States) Stevenson Motorsports	Audi R8 LMS	Audi DAR 5.2 L V10	6	(United States) Lawson Aschenbach	1
(United States) Stevenson Motorsports	Audi R8 LMS	Audi DAR 5.2 L V10	6	(United States) Matt Bell	1
(United States) Stevenson Motorsports	Audi R8 LMS	Audi DAR 5.2 L V10	6	(United States) Connor De Phillippi	2
(United States) Stevenson Motorsports	Audi R8 LMS	Audi DAR 5.2 L V10	6	(United States) Mike Skeen	12
(United States) Stevenson Motorsports	Audi R8 LMS	Audi DAR 5.2 L V10	9	(South Africa) Dion von Moltke	1–2, 12
(United States) Stevenson Motorsports	Audi R8 LMS	Audi DAR 5.2 L V10	9	(Australia) Kenny Habul	1
(United States) Stevenson Motorsports	Audi R8 LMS	Audi DAR 5.2 L V10	9	(United States) Boris Said	1
(United States) Stevenson Motorsports	Audi R8 LMS	Audi DAR 5.2 L V10	9	(France) Tristan Vautier	1
(United States) Stevenson Motorsports	Audi R8 LMS	Audi DAR 5.2 L V10	9	(United States) Lawson Aschenbach	2, 4–12
(United States) Stevenson Motorsports	Audi R8 LMS	Audi DAR 5.2 L V10	9	(United States) Matt Bell	2, 4–12
(United States) O'Gara Motorsport	Lamborghini Huracán GT3	Lamborghini DGF 5.2 L V10	11	(United States) Richard Antinucci	1
(United States) O'Gara Motorsport	Lamborghini Huracán GT3	Lamborghini DGF 5.2 L V10	11	(United States) Townsend Bell	1
(United States) O'Gara Motorsport	Lamborghini Huracán GT3	Lamborghini DGF 5.2 L V10	11	(Italy) Edoardo Piscopo	1
(United States) O'Gara Motorsport	Lamborghini Huracán GT3	Lamborghini DGF 5.2 L V10	11	(United States) Bill Sweedler	1
(United States) Change Racing	Lamborghini Huracán GT3	Lamborghini DGF 5.2 L V10	11	(United States) Townsend Bell	2, 4
(United States) Change Racing	Lamborghini Huracán GT3	Lamborghini DGF 5.2 L V10	11	(United States) Bill Sweedler	2, 4
(United States) Change Racing	Lamborghini Huracán GT3	Lamborghini DGF 5.2 L V10	11	(United States) Richard Antinucci	2
(United States) Change Racing	Lamborghini Huracán GT3	Lamborghini DGF 5.2 L V10	16	(United States) Corey Lewis	All
(United States) Change Racing	Lamborghini Huracán GT3	Lamborghini DGF 5.2 L V10	16	(United States) Spencer Pumpelly	All
(United States) Change Racing	Lamborghini Huracán GT3	Lamborghini DGF 5.2 L V10	16	(United States) Kaz Grala	1
(United States) Change Racing	Lamborghini Huracán GT3	Lamborghini DGF 5.2 L V10	16	(United States) Justin Marks	1
(United States) Change Racing	Lamborghini Huracán GT3	Lamborghini DGF 5.2 L V10	16	(United States) Al Carter	2
(United States) Change Racing	Lamborghini Huracán GT3	Lamborghini DGF 5.2 L V10	16	(United States) Richard Antinucci	12
(Austria) Konrad Motorsport	Lamborghini Huracán GT3	Lamborghini DGF 5.2 L V10	21	(Italy) Emanuele Busnelli	1
(Austria) Konrad Motorsport	Lamborghini Huracán GT3	Lamborghini DGF 5.2 L V10	21	(United States) Jim Michaelian	1
(Austria) Konrad Motorsport	Lamborghini Huracán GT3	Lamborghini DGF 5.2 L V10	21	(United States) Joseph Toussaint	1
(Austria) Konrad Motorsport	Lamborghini Huracán GT3	Lamborghini DGF 5.2 L V10	21	(United States) Lance Willsey	1
(Austria) Konrad Motorsport	Lamborghini Huracán GT3	Lamborghini DGF 5.2 L V10	21	(Germany) Pierre Ehret	2
(Austria) Konrad Motorsport	Lamborghini Huracán GT3	Lamborghini DGF 5.2 L V10	21	(Germany) Jürgen Krebs	2
(Austria) Konrad Motorsport	Lamborghini Huracán GT3	Lamborghini DGF 5.2 L V10	21	(Austria) Christopher Zöchling	2
(Austria) Konrad Motorsport	Lamborghini Huracán GT3	Lamborghini DGF 5.2 L V10	28	(Austria) Franz Konrad	1–2
(Austria) Konrad Motorsport	Lamborghini Huracán GT3	Lamborghini DGF 5.2 L V10	28	(Italy) Fabio Babini	1
(Austria) Konrad Motorsport	Lamborghini Huracán GT3	Lamborghini DGF 5.2 L V10	28	(Germany) Marc Basseng	1
(Austria) Konrad Motorsport	Lamborghini Huracán GT3	Lamborghini DGF 5.2 L V10	28	(Switzerland) Rolf Ineichen	1
(Austria) Konrad Motorsport	Lamborghini Huracán GT3	Lamborghini DGF 5.2 L V10	28	(United States) Lance Willsey	1
(Austria) Konrad Motorsport	Lamborghini Huracán GT3	Lamborghini DGF 5.2 L V10	28	(United States) Terry Borcheller	2
(Austria) Konrad Motorsport	Lamborghini Huracán GT3	Lamborghini DGF 5.2 L V10	28	(Germany) Christopher Brück	2
(Austria) Konrad Motorsport	Lamborghini Huracán GT3	Lamborghini DGF 5.2 L V10	28	(United Kingdom) Josh Webster	2
(United States) / Alex Job Racing (Note: 1. 22 and #77 entered as Alex Job Racing and #23 entered as Team Seattle / Alex Job Racing.); (United States) / Team Seattle / Alex Job Racing	Porsche 911 GT3 R	Porsche 4.0 L Flat-6	22	(United States) Cooper MacNeil	1–2, 4–9
(United States) / Alex Job Racing; (United States) / Team Seattle / Alex Job Racing	Porsche 911 GT3 R	Porsche 4.0 L Flat-6	22	(United States) Leh Keen	1–2, 4–8
(United States) / Alex Job Racing; (United States) / Team Seattle / Alex Job Racing	Porsche 911 GT3 R	Porsche 4.0 L Flat-6	22	(United States) Gunnar Jeannette	1–2, 6
(United States) / Alex Job Racing; (United States) / Team Seattle / Alex Job Racing	Porsche 911 GT3 R	Porsche 4.0 L Flat-6	22	(United States) David MacNeil	1
(United States) / Alex Job Racing; (United States) / Team Seattle / Alex Job Racing	Porsche 911 GT3 R	Porsche 4.0 L Flat-6	22	(New Zealand) Shane van Gisbergen	1
(United States) / Alex Job Racing; (United States) / Team Seattle / Alex Job Racing	Porsche 911 GT3 R	Porsche 4.0 L Flat-6	22	(Germany) Sven Müller	9
(United States) / Alex Job Racing; (United States) / Team Seattle / Alex Job Racing	Porsche 911 GT3 R	Porsche 4.0 L Flat-6	23	(Germany) Mario Farnbacher	All
(United States) / Alex Job Racing; (United States) / Team Seattle / Alex Job Racing	Porsche 911 GT3 R	Porsche 4.0 L Flat-6	23	(Spain) Alex Riberas	All
(United States) / Alex Job Racing; (United States) / Team Seattle / Alex Job Racing	Porsche 911 GT3 R	Porsche 4.0 L Flat-6	23	(United Kingdom) Ian James	1–2, 6, 12
(United States) / Alex Job Racing; (United States) / Team Seattle / Alex Job Racing	Porsche 911 GT3 R	Porsche 4.0 L Flat-6	23	(Germany) Wolf Henzler	1
(United States) / Alex Job Racing; (United States) / Team Seattle / Alex Job Racing	Porsche 911 GT3 R	Porsche 4.0 L Flat-6	77	(United States) Gunnar Jeannette	9
(United States) / Alex Job Racing; (United States) / Team Seattle / Alex Job Racing	Porsche 911 GT3 R	Porsche 4.0 L Flat-6	77	(United States) David MacNeil	9
(United States) Dream Racing	Lamborghini Huracán GT3	Lamborghini DGF 5.2 L V10	27	(Monaco) Cédric Sbirrazzuoli	2, 4–10, 12
(United States) Dream Racing	Lamborghini Huracán GT3	Lamborghini DGF 5.2 L V10	27	(Italy) Luca Persiani	2, 6, 9–12
(United States) Dream Racing	Lamborghini Huracán GT3	Lamborghini DGF 5.2 L V10	27	(Italy) Fabio Babini	2, 7
(United States) Dream Racing	Lamborghini Huracán GT3	Lamborghini DGF 5.2 L V10	27	(Italy) Paolo Ruberti	2, 11–12
(United States) Dream Racing	Lamborghini Huracán GT3	Lamborghini DGF 5.2 L V10	27	(United States) Lawrence DeGeorge	4–6, 8
(Germany) Frikadelli Racing	Porsche 911 GT3 R	Porsche 4.0 L Flat-6	30	(Germany) Klaus Abbelen	1
(Germany) Frikadelli Racing	Porsche 911 GT3 R	Porsche 4.0 L Flat-6	30	(Netherlands) Patrick Huisman	1
(Germany) Frikadelli Racing	Porsche 911 GT3 R	Porsche 4.0 L Flat-6	30	(Germany) Sven Müller	1
(Germany) Frikadelli Racing	Porsche 911 GT3 R	Porsche 4.0 L Flat-6	30	(Germany) Sabine Schmitz	1
(Germany) Frikadelli Racing	Porsche 911 GT3 R	Porsche 4.0 L Flat-6	30	(Germany) Frank Stippler	1
(United States) Riley Motorsports	Dodge Viper GT3-R	Dodge 8.3 L V10	33	(Netherlands) Jeroen Bleekemolen	All
(United States) Riley Motorsports	Dodge Viper GT3-R	Dodge 8.3 L V10	33	(United States) Ben Keating	All
(United States) Riley Motorsports	Dodge Viper GT3-R	Dodge 8.3 L V10	33	(United States) Marc Miller	1–2, 12
(United States) Riley Motorsports	Dodge Viper GT3-R	Dodge 8.3 L V10	33	(Germany) Dominik Farnbacher	1
(United States) Riley Motorsports	Dodge Viper GT3-R	Dodge 8.3 L V10	93	(Republic of Ireland) Damien Faulkner	1
(United States) Riley Motorsports	Dodge Viper GT3-R	Dodge 8.3 L V10	93	(United States) Eric Foss	1
(United States) Riley Motorsports	Dodge Viper GT3-R	Dodge 8.3 L V10	93	(United States) Ben Keating	1
(United States) Riley Motorsports	Dodge Viper GT3-R	Dodge 8.3 L V10	93	(United States) Jeff Mosing	1
(United States) Riley Motorsports	Dodge Viper GT3-R	Dodge 8.3 L V10	93	(United States) Gar Robinson	1
(United States) Magnus Racing	Audi R8 LMS	Audi DAR 5.2 L V10	44	(United States) Andy Lally	All
(United States) Magnus Racing	Audi R8 LMS	Audi DAR 5.2 L V10	44	(United States) John Potter	All
(United States) Magnus Racing	Audi R8 LMS	Audi DAR 5.2 L V10	44	(Germany) Marco Seefried	1–2, 12
(United States) Magnus Racing	Audi R8 LMS	Audi DAR 5.2 L V10	44	(Germany) René Rast	1
(United States) Magnus Racing	Audi R8 LMS	Audi DAR 5.2 L V10	44	(South Africa) Dion von Moltke	6
(United States) Flying Lizard Motorsports	Audi R8 LMS ultra	Audi DAR 5.2 L V10	45	(Sweden) Niclas Jönsson	1–2
(United States) Flying Lizard Motorsports	Audi R8 LMS ultra	Audi DAR 5.2 L V10	45	(Germany) Pierre Kaffer	1–2
(United States) Flying Lizard Motorsports	Audi R8 LMS ultra	Audi DAR 5.2 L V10	45	(United States) Tracy Krohn	1–2
(United States) Flying Lizard Motorsports	Audi R8 LMS ultra	Audi DAR 5.2 L V10	45	(Germany) Christopher Haase	1
(United States) Paul Miller Racing	Lamborghini Huracán GT3	Lamborghini DGF 5.2 L V10	48	(United States) Bryan Sellers	All
(United States) Paul Miller Racing	Lamborghini Huracán GT3	Lamborghini DGF 5.2 L V10	48	(United States) Madison Snow	All
(United States) Paul Miller Racing	Lamborghini Huracán GT3	Lamborghini DGF 5.2 L V10	48	(United States) Bryce Miller	1–2, 6, 12
(United States) Paul Miller Racing	Lamborghini Huracán GT3	Lamborghini DGF 5.2 L V10	48	(Italy) Mirko Bortolotti	1
(Switzerland) Spirit of Race	Ferrari 458 Italia GT3	Ferrari F136 4.5 L V8	51	(Italy) Matteo Cressoni	1–2
(Switzerland) Spirit of Race	Ferrari 458 Italia GT3	Ferrari F136 4.5 L V8	51	(Italy) Raffaele Giammaria	1–2
(Switzerland) Spirit of Race	Ferrari 458 Italia GT3	Ferrari F136 4.5 L V8	51	(United States) Peter Mann	1–2
(Switzerland) Spirit of Race	Ferrari 458 Italia GT3	Ferrari F136 4.5 L V8	51	(Italy) Marco Cioci	1
(United States) Scuderia Corsa	Ferrari 458 Italia GT3 1 Ferrari 488 GT3 2–12	Ferrari F136 4.5 L V8 1 Ferrari F154CB 3.9 L Turbo V8 2–12	63	(Italy) Alessandro Balzan	All
(United States) Scuderia Corsa	Ferrari 458 Italia GT3 1 Ferrari 488 GT3 2–12	Ferrari F136 4.5 L V8 1 Ferrari F154CB 3.9 L Turbo V8 2–12	63	(Denmark) Christina Nielsen	All
(United States) Scuderia Corsa	Ferrari 458 Italia GT3 1 Ferrari 488 GT3 2–12	Ferrari F136 4.5 L V8 1 Ferrari F154CB 3.9 L Turbo V8 2–12	63	(United States) Jeff Segal	1–2, 6, 12
(United States) Scuderia Corsa	Ferrari 458 Italia GT3 1 Ferrari 488 GT3 2–12	Ferrari F136 4.5 L V8 1 Ferrari F154CB 3.9 L Turbo V8 2–12	63	(Germany) Robert Renauer	1
(United States) Park Place Motorsports	Porsche 911 GT3 R	Porsche 4.0 L Flat-6	73	(Germany) Jörg Bergmeister	1–2, 4–9, 11–12
(United States) Park Place Motorsports	Porsche 911 GT3 R	Porsche 4.0 L Flat-6	73	(United States) Patrick Lindsey	1–2, 4–9, 11–12
(United States) Park Place Motorsports	Porsche 911 GT3 R	Porsche 4.0 L Flat-6	73	(United States) Matt McMurry	1–2, 6, 12
(United States) Park Place Motorsports	Porsche 911 GT3 R	Porsche 4.0 L Flat-6	73	(Austria) Norbert Siedler	1
(United States) Park Place Motorsports	Porsche 911 GT3 R	Porsche 4.0 L Flat-6	73	(Belgium) Jan Heylen	2
(United States) Lone Star Racing	Dodge Viper GT3-R	Dodge 8.3 L V10	80	(United States) Dan Knox	4, 9–11
(United States) Lone Star Racing	Dodge Viper GT3-R	Dodge 8.3 L V10	80	(United States) Mike Skeen	4, 9–11
(United States) Turner Motorsport	BMW M6 GT3	BMW S63 4.4 L Turbo V8	96	(United States) Bret Curtis	All
(United States) Turner Motorsport	BMW M6 GT3	BMW S63 4.4 L Turbo V8	96	(Germany) Jens Klingmann	All
(United States) Turner Motorsport	BMW M6 GT3	BMW S63 4.4 L Turbo V8	96	(United States) Ashley Freiberg	1–2, 12
(United States) Turner Motorsport	BMW M6 GT3	BMW S63 4.4 L Turbo V8	96	(Germany) Marco Wittmann	1
(United States) Turner Motorsport	BMW M6 GT3	BMW S63 4.4 L Turbo V8	97	(United States) Michael Marsal	All
(United States) Turner Motorsport	BMW M6 GT3	BMW S63 4.4 L Turbo V8	97	(Finland) Markus Palttala	All
(United States) Turner Motorsport	BMW M6 GT3	BMW S63 4.4 L Turbo V8	97	(Finland) Jesse Krohn	1–2
(United States) Turner Motorsport	BMW M6 GT3	BMW S63 4.4 L Turbo V8	97	(Belgium) Maxime Martin	1
(United States) Turner Motorsport	BMW M6 GT3	BMW S63 4.4 L Turbo V8	97	(United States) Cameron Lawrence	12
(United Kingdom) Aston Martin Racing	Aston Martin V12 Vantage GT3	Aston Martin 6.0 L V12	98	(Canada) Paul Dalla Lana	1–2
(United Kingdom) Aston Martin Racing	Aston Martin V12 Vantage GT3	Aston Martin 6.0 L V12	98	(Portugal) Pedro Lamy	1–2
(United Kingdom) Aston Martin Racing	Aston Martin V12 Vantage GT3	Aston Martin 6.0 L V12	98	(Austria) Mathias Lauda	1–2
(United Kingdom) Aston Martin Racing	Aston Martin V12 Vantage GT3	Aston Martin 6.0 L V12	98	(New Zealand) Richie Stanaway	1–2
(United States) TRG-AMR	Aston Martin V12 Vantage GT3	Aston Martin 6.0 L V12	007	(Australia) James Davison	1, 4
(United States) TRG-AMR	Aston Martin V12 Vantage GT3	Aston Martin 6.0 L V12	007	(Mexico) Santiago Creel	1
(United States) TRG-AMR	Aston Martin V12 Vantage GT3	Aston Martin 6.0 L V12	007	(Mexico) Antonio Pérez	1
(United States) TRG-AMR	Aston Martin V12 Vantage GT3	Aston Martin 6.0 L V12	007	(Mexico) Ricardo Pérez de Lara	1
(United States) TRG-AMR	Aston Martin V12 Vantage GT3	Aston Martin 6.0 L V12	007	(United Kingdom) Lars Viljoen	1
(United States) TRG-AMR	Aston Martin V12 Vantage GT3	Aston Martin 6.0 L V12	007	(United States) Brandon Davis	4
(United States) TRG-AMR	Aston Martin V12 Vantage GT3	Aston Martin 6.0 L V12	007	(United Kingdom) Ben Barker	11
(United States) TRG-AMR	Aston Martin V12 Vantage GT3	Aston Martin 6.0 L V12	007	(Australia) David Calvert-Jones	11
(United States) Black Swan Racing	Porsche 911 GT3 R	Porsche 4.0 L Flat-6	540	(United States) Tim Pappas	1–2, 4, 6, 8
(United States) Black Swan Racing	Porsche 911 GT3 R	Porsche 4.0 L Flat-6	540	(Netherlands) Nick Catsburg	1–2, 4, 6
(United States) Black Swan Racing	Porsche 911 GT3 R	Porsche 4.0 L Flat-6	540	(United States) Andy Pilgrim	1–2, 6, 8
(United States) Black Swan Racing	Porsche 911 GT3 R	Porsche 4.0 L Flat-6	540	(United States) Patrick Long	1–2

=== Team changes ===
- After 8 years sported the higher E85 Ethanol blend, Corvette Racing officially switched to traditional E20 Ethanol 20% blend as it was announced on October 13, 2015.

== Race results ==
Bold indicates overall winner.

Rnd	Circuit	Prototype Winning Team	PC Winning Team	GTLM Winning Team	GTD Winning Team	Report
Rnd	Circuit	Prototype Winning Drivers	PC Winning Drivers	GTLM Winning Drivers	GTD Winning Drivers	Report
1	Daytona	(United States) **No. 2 Tequila Patrón ESM**	(United States) No. 85 JDC-Miller MotorSports	(United States) No. 4 Corvette Racing	(United States) No. 44 Magnus Racing	Report
1	Daytona	(United States) **Ed Brown** **(Brazil) Pipo Derani** **(United States) Johannes van Overbeek** **(United States) Scott Sharp**	(Canada) Mikhail Goikhberg (United States) Kenton Koch (United States) Chris Miller (South Africa) Stephen Simpson	(Switzerland) Marcel Fässler (United Kingdom) Oliver Gavin (United States) Tommy Milner	(United States) Andy Lally (United States) John Potter (Germany) René Rast (Germany) Marco Seefried	Report
2	Sebring	(United States) **No. 2 Tequila Patrón ESM**	(United States) No. 54 CORE Autosport	(United States) No. 4 Corvette Racing	(United States) No. 63 Scuderia Corsa	Report
2	Sebring	(United States) **Ed Brown** **(Brazil) Pipo Derani** **(United States) Johannes van Overbeek** **(United States) Scott Sharp**	(United States) Jon Bennett (United States) Colin Braun (Canada) Mark Wilkins	(Switzerland) Marcel Fässler (United Kingdom) Oliver Gavin (United States) Tommy Milner	(Italy) Alessandro Balzan (Denmark) Christina Nielsen (United States) Jeff Segal	Report
3	Long Beach	(United States) **No. 10 Wayne Taylor Racing**	(United States) No. 85 JDC-Miller MotorSports	(United States) No. 911 Porsche North America	did not participate	Report
3	Long Beach	(United States) **Jordan Taylor** **(United States) Ricky Taylor**	(Canada) Mikhail Goikhberg (South Africa) Stephen Simpson	(France) Patrick Pilet (United Kingdom) Nick Tandy	did not participate	Report
4	Laguna Seca	(United States) **No. 60 Michael Shank Racing with Curb-Agajanian**	(United States) No. 52 PR1/Mathiasen Motorsports	(United States) No. 67 Ford Chip Ganassi Racing	(United States) No. 23 Team Seattle / Alex Job Racing	Report
4	Laguna Seca	(Brazil) **Oswaldo Negri Jr.** **(United States) John Pew**	(United States) Robert Alon (United Kingdom) Tom Kimber-Smith	(Australia) Ryan Briscoe (United Kingdom) Richard Westbrook	(Germany) Mario Farnbacher (Spain) Alex Riberas	Report
5	Belle Isle	(United States) **No. 10 Wayne Taylor Racing**	(United States) No. 8 Starworks Motorsport	did not participate	(United States) No. 33 Riley Motorsports	Report
5	Belle Isle	(United States) **Jordan Taylor** **(United States) Ricky Taylor**	(Venezuela) Alex Popow (Netherlands) Renger van der Zande	did not participate	(Netherlands) Jeroen Bleekemolen (United States) Ben Keating	Report
6	Watkins Glen	(United States) **No. 5 Action Express Racing**	(United States) No. 8 Starworks Motorsport	(United States) No. 67 Ford Chip Ganassi Racing	(United States) No. 63 Scuderia Corsa	Report
6	Watkins Glen	(Portugal) **Filipe Albuquerque** **(Portugal) João Barbosa** **(Brazil) Christian Fittipaldi**	(Venezuela) Alex Popow (Netherlands) Renger van der Zande	(Australia) Ryan Briscoe (United Kingdom) Richard Westbrook	(Italy) Alessandro Balzan (Denmark) Christina Nielsen (United States) Jeff Segal	Report
7	Mosport	(United States) **No. 31 Action Express Racing**	(United States) No. 54 CORE Autosport	(United States) No. 67 Ford Chip Ganassi Racing	(United States) No. 96 Turner Motorsport	Report
7	Mosport	(United States) **Dane Cameron** **(United States) Eric Curran**	(United States) Jon Bennett (United States) Colin Braun	(Australia) Ryan Briscoe (United Kingdom) Richard Westbrook	(United States) Bret Curtis (Germany) Jens Klingmann	Report
8	Lime Rock	did not participate	(United States) **No. 8 Starworks Motorsport**	(United States) No. 4 Corvette Racing	(United States) No. 44 Magnus Racing	Report
8	Lime Rock	did not participate	(Venezuela) **Alex Popow** **(Netherlands) Renger van der Zande**	(United Kingdom) Oliver Gavin (United States) Tommy Milner	(United States) Andy Lally (United States) John Potter	Report
9	Road America	(United States) **No. 31 Action Express Racing**	(United States) No. 52 PR1/Mathiasen Motorsports	(United States) No. 4 Corvette Racing	(United States) No. 33 Riley Motorsports	Report
9	Road America	(United States) **Dane Cameron** **(United States) Eric Curran**	(United States) Robert Alon (United Kingdom) Tom Kimber-Smith	(United Kingdom) Oliver Gavin (United States) Tommy Milner	(Netherlands) Jeroen Bleekemolen (United States) Ben Keating	Report
10	Virginia	did not participate	did not participate	(United States) **No. 3 Corvette Racing**	(United States) No. 48 Paul Miller Racing	Report
10	Virginia	did not participate	did not participate	(Spain) **Antonio García** **(Denmark) Jan Magnussen**	(United States) Bryan Sellers (United States) Madison Snow	Report
11	Austin	(United States) **No. 10 Wayne Taylor Racing**	(United States) No. 8 Starworks Motorsport	(United States) No. 912 Porsche North America	(United States) No. 96 Turner Motorsport	Report
11	Austin	(United States) **Jordan Taylor** **(United States) Ricky Taylor**	(Venezuela) Alex Popow (Netherlands) Renger van der Zande	(New Zealand) Earl Bamber (France) Frédéric Makowiecki	(United States) Bret Curtis (Germany) Jens Klingmann	Report
12	Road Atlanta	(United States) **No. 60 Michael Shank Racing with Curb-Agajanian**	(United States) No. 52 PR1/Mathiasen Motorsports	(United States) No. 62 Risi Competizione	(United States) No. 33 Riley Motorsports	Report
12	Road Atlanta	(Brazil) **Oswaldo Negri Jr.** **(United States) John Pew** **(France) Olivier Pla**	(United States) Robert Alon (United Kingdom) Tom Kimber-Smith (Mexico) José Gutiérrez	(Italy) Giancarlo Fisichella (Finland) Toni Vilander (United Kingdom) James Calado	(Netherlands) Jeroen Bleekemolen (United States) Ben Keating (United States) Marc Miller	Report

== Championship standings ==
=== Points systems ===
Championship points are awarded in each class at the finish of each event. Points are awarded based on finishing positions as shown in the chart below.

Position	1	2	3	4	5	6	7	8	9	10	11	12	13	14	15	16	17	18	19	20	21	22	23	24	25	26	27	28	29	30
Race	35	32	30	28	26	25	24	23	22	21	20	19	18	17	16	15	14	13	12	11	10	9	8	7	6	5	4	3	2	1

==== Drivers points ====
Points are awarded in each class at the finish of each event. Drivers must complete a minimum driving time (outlined to teams prior to each event) in order to score points. A driver does not score points if the minimum drive time is not met.

In addition, for each car credited with a race start, each driver nominated in that car also receives one additional “starting point.”

==== Team points ====
Team points are calculated in exactly the same way as driver points, using the point distribution chart and “starting points.” Each car entered is considered its own “team” regardless if it is a single entry or part of a two-car team.

==== Manufacturer points ====
There are also a number of manufacturer championships which utilize the same season-long point distribution chart, minus the “starting points” used for the driver and team championships. (The “starting point” is not used in manufacturer championship points.) The manufacturer championships recognized by IMSA are as follows:

Prototype (P): Engine Manufacturer
GT Le Mans (GTLM): Car Manufacturer
GT Daytona (GTD): Car Manufacturer

Each manufacturer receives finishing points for its highest finishing car in each class. The positions of subsequent finishing cars from the same manufacturer are not taken into consideration, and all other manufacturers move up in the order.

Example: Manufacturer A finishes 1st and 2nd at an event, and Manufacturer B finishes 3rd. Manufacturer A receives 35 first-place points while Manufacturer B would earn 32 second-place points.

The points system for the 2016 season is the same as in 2015.

==== North American Endurance Cup ====
The points system for the North American Endurance Cup is different from the normal points system. Points are awarded on a 5-4-3-2 basis for drivers, teams and manufacturers. The first finishing position at each interval earns five points, four points for second position, three points for third, with two points awarded for fourth and each subsequent finishing position.

Position	1	2	3	Other Classified
Race	5	4	3	2

At Daytona (24 hour race), points are awarded at six hours, 12 hours, 18 hours and at the finish. At the Sebring (12 hour race), points are awarded at four hours, eight hours and at the finish. At Watkins Glen (6 hour race), points are awarded at three hours and at the finish. At Road Atlanta (10 hour race), points are awarded at four hours, eight hours and at the finish.

Like the season-long team championship, North American Endurance Cup team points are awarded for each car and drivers get points in any car that they drive, in which they are entered for points. The manufacturer points go to the highest placed car from that manufacturer (the others from that manufacturer not being counted), just like the season-long manufacturer championship.

For example: in any particular segment manufacturer A finishes 1st and 2nd and manufacturer B finishes 3rd. Manufacturer A only receives first-place points for that segment. Manufacturer B receives the second-place points.

=== Drivers' championships ===
Race is part of the North American Endurance Cup

==== Prototype ====
Pos.	Driver	**DAY**	**SEB**	LBH	LGA	BEL	**WGL**	MOS	ELK	AUS	**ATL**	Points	NAEC
1	(United States) Dane Cameron	6	2	3	3	6	2	1	1	2	4	314	35
1	(United States) Eric Curran	6	2	3	3	6	2	1	1	2	4	314	35
2	(Portugal) João Barbosa	4	3	2	7	2	1	2	2	3	5	311	**43**
2	(Brazil) Christian Fittipaldi	4	3	**2**	7	**2**	1	2	2	3	5	311	**43**
3	(United States) Jordan Taylor	2	12	1	6	1	4	3	3	1	3	309	34
3	(United States) Ricky Taylor	2	12	1	6	1	4	3	3	**1**	3	309	34
4	(Brazil) Oswaldo Negri Jr.	11	7	7	1	5	3	6	4	6	1	282	**35**
5	(Belgium) Marc Goossens	3	5	6	2	7	6	4	6	7	7	273	25
6	(United States) Tom Long	13	8	4	8	4	5	5	8	4	6	258	25
6	(United States) Joel Miller	13	8	4	8	4	5	5	8	4	6	258	25
7	(United States) Jonathan Bomarito	10	6	5	4	3	8	8	**5**	8	9	257	25
7	(United States) Tristan Nunez	10	6	5	**4**	3	8	**8**	5	8	9	257	25
8	(United States) John Pew	11	7	7	1		3	6	4	6	1	255	**35**
9	(United Kingdom) Ryan Dalziel	3	5		2	7	6	4	6	7	7	247	25
10	(United Kingdom) Katherine Legge	12	9	8	5	5	7	7	7	5	8	247	24
11	(United States) Sean Rayhall	12	9		5		7	7	7	5	8	196	24
12	(Brazil) Pipo Derani	1	1				9				2	128	**41**
12	(United States) Johannes van Overbeek	1	1				**9**				2	128	**41**
12	(United States) Scott Sharp	1	1				9				2	128	**41**
13	(France) Olivier Pla	11	**7**				3				**1**	113	**35**
14	(Italy) Max Angelelli	2	12				4				3	113	34
15	(United States) Ryan Hunter-Reay	3	5	6							7	109	21
16	(United States) Spencer Pigot	10	6				8				9	95	25
17	(United Kingdom) Andy Meyrick	12	9	8							8	91	20
18	(Portugal) Filipe Albuquerque	4	3				1†				5	88	34
19	(United States) Ed Brown	1	1									72	26
20	(United Kingdom) Ben Devlin	13	8				5					70	18
21	(United States) Scott Pruett	4	2									62	25
22	(France) Simon Pagenaud	6									4	55	17
23	(Brazil) Rubens Barrichello	2	12									53	18
24	(France) Nicolas Minassian	9	4									52	14
25	(United States) Byron DeFoor	8	10				DNS					46	14
25	(United States) Jim Pace	8	10				DNS					46	14
25	(United States) Dorsey Schroeder	8	10				DNS					46	14
25	(United Kingdom) David Hinton	8	10									46	14
26	(Sweden) Henrik Hedman		4									29	6
26	(France) Nicolas Lapierre		4									29	6
27	(New Zealand) Brendon Hartley	5										27	9
27	(United Kingdom) Andy Priaulx	5										27	9
27	(Canada) Lance Stroll	5										27	9
27	(Austria) Alexander Wurz	5										27	9
28	(United Kingdom) Jonathan Adam	6										26	11
29	(New Zealand) Scott Dixon	7										25	8
29	(Brazil) Tony Kanaan	7										25	8
29	(United States) Kyle Larson	7										25	8
29	(United States) Jamie McMurray	7										25	8
30	(Colombia) Gabby Chaves						7					25	4
31	(Austria) Thomas Gruber	8										24	8
32	(Japan) Keiko Ihara		8									24	6
33	(Russia) Mikhail Aleshin	**9**										23	8
33	(Russia) Kirill Ladygin	9										23	8
33	(Italy) Maurizio Mediani	9										23	8
34	(United States) A. J. Allmendinger	11										21	11
35	(Germany) Dominik Farnbacher		11									21	6
35	(United States) Cameron Lawrence		11									21	6
35	(Canada) Daniel Morad		11									21	6
35	(United States) Carlos de Quesada		11									21	6
36	(Germany) Andreas Wirth	12										20	8

Colour	Result
Gold	Winner
Silver	Second place
Bronze	Third place
Green	Points classification
Blue	Non-points classification
Blue	Non-classified finish (NC)
Purple	Retired, not classified (Ret)
Red	Did not qualify (DNQ)
Red	Did not pre-qualify (DNPQ)
Black	Disqualified (DSQ)
White	Did not start (DNS)
White	Withdrew (WD)
White	Race cancelled (C)
Blank	Did not practice (DNP)
Blank	Did not arrive (DNA)
Blank	Excluded (EX)

**Bold** - Pole position
Italics - Fastest lap

Notes

- Drivers denoted by † did not complete sufficient laps in order to score points.

==== Prototype Challenge ====
Pos.	Driver	**DAY**	**SEB**	LBH	LGA	BEL	**WGL**	MOS	LIM	ELK	AUS	**ATL**	Points	NAEC
1	(Venezuela) Alex Popow	4	3	2	2	1	1	2	1	6	1	6	355	30
1	(Netherlands) Renger van der Zande	4	3	2	2	1	**1**	2	1	6	1	6	355	30
2	(United States) Robert Alon	2	2	6	**1**	**3**	5	3	2	1	**2**	**1**	355	**47**
2	(United Kingdom) Tom Kimber-Smith	2	2	6	1	3	5	3	2	1	2	1	355	**47**
3	(Canada) Mikhail Goikhberg	1	4	1	5	7	4	5	6	7	6	3	317	**38**
3	(South Africa) Stephen Simpson	1	4	1	5	7	4	5	6	7	6	3	317	**38**
4	(United States) James French	6†	5	**3**	4	4	2	4	3	**3**	3	2	305	27
5	(Canada) Kyle Marcelli	6†	5	3	4	4	2	4	3	3		2	274	27
6	(United Kingdom) Johnny Mowlem	**3**	6	4	6	5	7†	6	4	8		5	246	26
7	(United States) Jon Bennett	8†	1	7	3	2	6	1	8	2			245	16
7	(United States) Colin Braun	8†	**1**	7	3	2	6	**1**	**8**	2			245	16
8	(Mexico) José Gutiérrez	2	2				5		7	4	5	1	210	**47**
9	(United States) Mark Kvamme	7†		5	7	6	3†	7	5	9†	8	4	186	6
10	(United States) Matt McMurry				6		7†	6	4	5	4		138	0
11	(United States) Kenton Koch	1	4				2					2	131	**46**
12	(United States) Don Yount	5	6				7†			8	7	5	130	23
13	(United States) Chris Miller	1	4				4					3	125	**38**
14	(United States) Tomy Drissi	3		4		5						5	114	19
15	(United Kingdom) Richard Bradley						3	7		9†	8	4	110	12
16	(United States) Ashley Freiberg			5	7	6							78	–
17	(United States) Nicholas Boulle	2									3		64	16
18	(Canada) Remo Ruscitti						3		5				58	6
19	(United States) Marc Drumwright	3	6										57	20
20	(Denmark) David Heinemeier Hansson		3									6	57	13
21	(Venezuela) Gustavo Yacamán									4	5		56	–
21	(Brazil) Bruno Junqueira									5	4		56	–
22	(United Kingdom) Ryan Lewis	5	6										53	17
23	(United States) John Falb	5									7		52	10
24	(Puerto Rico) Ricardo Vera	3											31	13
25	(United States) Max Hanratty											4	29	6
26	(United States) Adam Merzon	5											27	10
27	(Germany) Maro Engel	7†	7										26	7
27	(United States) Sean Johnston	7†	7										26	7
28	(United States) Sean Rayhall								7				25	–
29	(Canada) Mark Wilkins	8†	1†				6†						3	0
30	(United States) Josh Norman	6†	5†										2	0
31	(United States) Brendan Gaughan	3†											1	0
31	(Canada) Chris Cumming	4†											1	0
31	(United States) Ryan Eversley	5†											1	0
31	(United States) Brandon Gdovic	6†											1	0
31	(United States) Jim Norman	6†											1	0
31	(Sweden) Felix Rosenqvist	7†											1	0
31	(United Kingdom) Michael Lyons		7†										1	0
31	(Monaco) Stefano Coletti											7†	1	0
31	(Canada) James Dayson											7†	1	0
31	(United States) Quinlan Lall											7†	1	0
31	(United Kingdom) Martin Plowman	8†											1	0
–	(United Kingdom) Jack Hawksworth	4†^{1}											0	–

Notes

- ^{1} – Jack Hawksworth did not drive any laps during the race and therefore did not receive the one "starting point".
- Drivers denoted by † did not complete sufficient laps in order to score points.

==== GT Le Mans ====
Pos.	Driver	**DAY**	**SEB**	LBH	LGA	**WGL**	MOS	LIM	ELK	VIR	AUS	**ATL**	Points	NAEC
1	(United Kingdom) Oliver Gavin	1	1	2	7	4	2	1	1	9	5	3	345	**38**
1	(United States) Tommy Milner	1	1	2	7	4	2	1	1	9	5	3	345	**38**
2	(Australia) Ryan Briscoe	9	5	4	1	1	1	3	2	4	**9**	7	328	32
2	(United Kingdom) Richard Westbrook	9	5	4	1	**1**	1	**3**	2	4	9	**7**	328	32
3	(Spain) Antonio García	2	9	9	4	7	**3**	2	6	1	3	4	319	29
3	(Denmark) Jan Magnussen	2	9	9	4	7	3	2	6	**1**	3	4	319	29
4	(New Zealand) Earl Bamber	3	3	7	3	10	6	8	4	3	1	5	313	32
4	(France) Frédéric Makowiecki	3	3	7	3	10	6	8	4	3	1	5	313	32
5	(Italy) Giancarlo Fisichella	6	4	3	5	6	7	4	5	7	8	1	305	**32**
5	(Finland) Toni Vilander	6	4	3	5	6	7	4	5	7	8	1	305	**32**
6	(United States) Joey Hand	7	8	8	6	2	5	5	9	2	6	2	301	32
6	(Germany) Dirk Müller	7	8	8	6	2	5	5	**9**	2	6	2	301	32
7	(United States) Bill Auberlen	5	**2**	**5**	9	3	4	7	8	5	4	9	298	32
7	(Germany) Dirk Werner	5	2	5	9	3	4	7	8	5	4	9	298	32
8	(France) Patrick Pilet	8	10	1	8	9	8	6	7	6	2	10	285	32
8	(United Kingdom) Nick Tandy	**8**	10	1	8	9	8	6	7	6	2	10	285	32
9	(United States) John Edwards	11	6	10	10	8	9	9	3	8	7	6	267	26
9	(Germany) Lucas Luhr	11	6	10	10	8	9	9	3	8	7	6	267	26
10	(Brazil) Daniel Serra	4	7	6	**2**	5						8	164	27
11	(Italy) Alessandro Pier Guidi	4	7		2	5						8	138	27
12	(Switzerland) Marcel Fässler	1	1									3	103	**34**
13	(Denmark) Michael Christensen	3	3									5	89	28
14	(Germany) Mike Rockenfeller	2	9									4	85	25
15	(France) Sébastien Bourdais	7	8									2	82	25
16	(Canada) Kuno Wittmer	11	6									6	73	22
17	(Italy) Andrea Bertolini	10	7									8	71	20
18	(Canada) Bruno Spengler	5	2										60	18
19	(United Kingdom) James Calado	10										1	58	22
20	(Italy) Davide Rigon	6	4										55	14
21	(New Zealand) Scott Dixon		5									7	52	15
22	(Brazil) Augusto Farfus	5										9	50	14
23	(France) Kévin Estre	8	10										46	22
24	(France) Alexandre Prémat	4											29	11
24	(Mexico) Memo Rojas	4											29	11
25	(Monaco) Olivier Beretta	6											26	8
26	(Italy) Alessandro Balzan			6									26	–
27	(Germany) Stefan Mücke	9											23	8
28	(Italy) Gianmaria Bruni	10											22	8
28	(Russia) Viktor Shaitar	10											22	8
29	(Austria) Richard Lietz											10	22	6
30	(United States) Graham Rahal	11											21	9

==== GT Daytona ====
Pos.	Driver	**DAY**	**SEB**	LGA	BEL	**WGL**	MOS	LIM	ELK	VIR	AUS	**ATL**	Points	NAEC
1	(Italy) Alessandro Balzan	6	1	2	3	1	4	11	3	7	3	2	332	**35**
1	(Denmark) Christina Nielsen	6	1	2	3	1	4	11	3	7	3	2	332	**35**
2	(Netherlands) Jeroen Bleekemolen	9	12	6	1	4	11	3	1	6	13	**1**	303	30
2	(United States) Ben Keating	9	12	6	1	4	11	3	1	6	13	1	303	30
3	(United States) Bryan Sellers	16^{1}	6	7	**8**	12	3	4	8	1	2	4	293	29
3	(United States) Madison Snow	16^{1}	6	7	8	12	3	4	8	**1**	2	4	293	29
4	(United States) Andrew Davis	14	8	4	5	11	2	2	5	3	10	7	290	25
4	(United Kingdom) Robin Liddell	14	8	4	5	11	2	2	5	3	10	7	290	25
5	(Germany) Mario Farnbacher	8	4	1	4	**3**	12	14	12	4	7	8	285	**35**
5	(Spain) Alex Riberas	8	4	**1**	4	3	**12**	14	**12**	4	**7**	8	285	**35**
6	(United States) Bret Curtis	22^{2}	2	5	9	13	1	6	7	11	1	9	279	26
6	(Germany) Jens Klingmann	22^{2}	2	5	9	13	1	6	7	11	1	9	279	26
7	(United States) Andy Lally	1	3	13	10	2	10	1	4	21	4	11†^{3}	258	27
7	(United States) John Potter	1	3	13	10	2	10	1	4	21	4	11†^{3}	258	27
8	(United States) Lawson Aschenbach	14	16	9	13	6	9	5	6	2	12	5	258	**33**
8	(United States) Matt Bell	14	16	9	13	6	9	5	6	2	12	5	258	**33**
9	(United States) Corey Lewis	18^{1}	11	10	6	9	5	8	14	5	9	10	247	26
9	(United States) Spencer Pumpelly	18^{1}	11	10	6	9	5	**8**	14	5	9	10	247	26
10	(United States) Michael Marsal	5	7	12	11	10	13†	7	9	8	14	3	237	27
10	(Finland) Markus Palttala	5	7	12	11	10	13†	7	9	8	14	3	237	27
11	(Germany) Jörg Bergmeister	17†	17	11	2	8	6	10	2		5	12†^{4}	203	13
11	(United States) Patrick Lindsey	17†	17	11	2	8	6	10	2		5	12†^{4}	203	13
12	(United States) Cooper MacNeil	13	5	8	7	5	7	9	11				190	18
13	(United States) Leh Keen	13	5	8	7	5	7	9					169	18
14	(Monaco) Cédric Sbirrazzuoli		19†	16	12	DNS	8	13	15	10		6	145	6
15	(United States) Tim Pappas	2	13	17	WD	7		12					112	20
16	(United States) Jeff Segal	6	**1**			1†						2	96	28
17	(Netherlands) Nick Catsburg	2	13	17	WD	7							92	20
18	(Germany) Marco Seefried	1	3									11^{3}	88	32
19	(United States) Mike Skeen			14					10	9	8	7†	88	0
20	(United States) Dan Knox			14					10	9	8		87	–
21	(United States) Matt McMurry	17	17			8						12^{4}	74	27
22	(United States) Andy Pilgrim	2	13			7†		12					73	16
23	(United States) Gunnar Jeannette	13	5			5†			13				66	14
24	(Italy) Luca Persiani		19†			DNS			15	10	11	6†	62	0
25	(United States) Lawrence DeGeorge			16	12	DNS		13					55	0
26	(United States) Patrick Long	2	13										52	16
27	(Finland) Jesse Krohn	5	7										52	16
28	(Canada) Paul Dalla Lana	4	10										51	16
28	(Portugal) Pedro Lamy	4	10										51	16
28	(Austria) Mathias Lauda	4	10										51	16
28	(New Zealand) Richie Stanaway	4	10										51	16
29	(Italy) Paolo Ruberti		19†								11	6	48	6
30	(Italy) Fabio Babini	10^{1}	19†				8						47	8
31	(United States) Bryce Miller	16^{1}	6			12†						4†	44	19
32	(Italy) Matteo Cressoni	11	9										44	14
32	(Italy) Raffaele Giammaria	11	9										44	14
33	(Germany) Sven Müller	12							11				41	8
34	(United States) David MacNeil	13							13				38	8
35	(Germany) René Rast	1											36	14
36	(United States) Townsend Bell	15^{1}	18†	15									35	8
36	(United States) Bill Sweedler	15^{1}	18†	15									35	8
37	(Australia) James Davison	20†		3									32	0
38	(Republic of Ireland) Damien Faulkner	3											31	9
38	(United States) Eric Foss	3											31	9
38	(United States) Jeff Mosing	3											31	9
38	(United States) Gar Robinson	3											31	9
39	(United States) Brandon Davis			3									31	–
40	(United States) Tracy Krohn	19	15										30	14
41	(South Africa) Dion von Moltke	7	16†			2†						5†	28	8
42	(United Kingdom) Ian James	8	4†			3†						8†	27	12
43	(Belgium) Maxime Martin	5											27	10
44	(Germany) Robert Renauer	6											26	10
45	(United Kingdom) Ben Barker										6		26	–
45	(Australia) David Calvert-Jones										6		26	–
46	(United States) Marc Miller	9	12†									1†	25	8
47	(Australia) Kenny Habul	7											25	8
47	(United States) Boris Said	7											25	8
47	(France) Tristan Vautier	7											25	8
48	(Germany) Wolf Henzler	8											24	12
49	(Germany) Dominik Farnbacher	9											23	8
50	(Germany) Marc Basseng	10^{1}											22	8
50	(Switzerland) Rolf Ineichen	10^{1}											22	8
50	(United States) Lance Willsey	10^{1}											22	8
51	(United States) Peter Mann	11	9†										22	8
52	(Italy) Marco Cioci	11											21	8
53	(Netherlands) Patrick Huisman	12											20	8
53	(Germany) Sabine Schmitz	12											20	8
53	(Germany) Frank Stippler	12											20	8
54	(United States) Richard Antinucci	15^{1}	18†									10†	19	8
55	(New Zealand) Shane van Gisbergen	13											19	8
56	(United States) Terry Borcheller		14										18	6
56	(Germany) Christopher Brück		14										18	6
56	(United Kingdom) Josh Webster		14										18	6
57	(Sweden) Niclas Jönsson	19†	15										18	6
57	(Germany) Pierre Kaffer	19†	15										18	6
58	(Italy) Edoardo Piscopo	15^{1}											17	8
59	(Italy) Mirko Bortolotti	16^{1}											16	11
60	(Austria) Norbert Siedler	**17**											15	8
61	(Belgium) Jan Heylen		17										15	6
62	(United States) Ashley Freiberg	22^{2}	2†									9†	12	8
63	(Germany) Marco Wittmann	22^{2}											10	8
64	(Austria) Franz Konrad	10†^{1}	14†										2	0
65	(United States) Cameron Lawrence											3†	1	0
65	(United States) Connor De Phillippi		8†										1	0
65	(United States) Al Carter		11†										1	0
65	(Germany) Klaus Abbelen	12†											1	0
65	(United States) Kaz Grala	18†^{1}											1	0
65	(United States) Justin Marks	18†^{1}											1	0
65	(Germany) Christopher Haase	19†											1	0
65	(Mexico) Santiago Creel	20†											1	0
65	(Mexico) Antonio Pérez	20†											1	0
65	(Mexico) Ricardo Pérez de Lara	20†											1	0
65	(United Kingdom) Lars Viljoen	20†											1	0
65	(Italy) Emanuele Busnelli	21†^{1}											1	0
65	(United States) Jim Michaelian	21†^{1}											1	0
65	(United States) Joseph Toussaint	21†^{1}											1	0
66	(Germany) Pierre Ehret		DNS										0	0
66	(Germany) Jürgen Krebs		DNS										0	0
66	(Austria) Christopher Zöchling		DNS										0	0

Notes

- ^{1} – All drivers using Lamborghini Huracán GT3-cars were penalized with five minutes added to their total time due to BoP-regulations.
- ^{2} – Bret Curtis, Ashley Freiberg, Jens Klingmann and Marco Wittmann were put to the back of their class for exceeding the maximum drive-time limitation.
- ^{3} – Andy Lally, John Potter and Marco Seefried were put to second to last in their class for a minimum drive-time violation.
- ^{4} – Jörg Bergmeister, Patrick Lindsey and Matt McMurry were put to last in their class for a minimum drive-time violation.
- Drivers denoted by † did not complete sufficient laps in order to score points.

=== Teams' championships ===
Race is part of the North American Endurance Cup

==== Prototype ====
Pos.	Team	**DAY**	**SEB**	LBH	LGA	BEL	**WGL**	MOS	ELK	AUS	**ATL**	Points	NAEC
1	No. 31 Action Express Racing	6	2	3	3	6	2	1	1	2	4	314	35
2	No. 5 Action Express Racing	4	3	**2**	7	**2**	1	2	2	3	5	311	**43**
3	No. 10 Wayne Taylor Racing	2	12	1	6	1	4	3	3	**1**	3	309	34
4	No. 60 Michael Shank Racing with Curb-Agajanian	11	**7**	7	1	5	3	6	4	6	**1**	282	**35**
5	No. 90 VisitFlorida Racing	3	5	6	2	7	6	4	6	7	7	273	25
6	No. 70 Mazda Motorsports	13	8	4	8	4	5	5	8	4	6	258	25
7	No. 55 Mazda Motorsports	10	6	5	**4**	3	8	**8**	**5**	8	9	257	25
8	No. 0 Panoz DeltaWing Racing	12	9	8	5		7	7	7	5	8	220	24
9	No. 2 Tequila Patrón ESM	1	1				**9**				2	128	**41**
10	No. 50 Highway to Help	8	10				DNS					46	14
11	No. 81 DragonSpeed		4									29	6
12	No. 01 Ford Chip Ganassi Racing	5										27	9
13	No. 02 Ford Chip Ganassi Racing	7										25	8
14	No. 37 SMP Racing	**9**										23	8
15	No. 24 Alegra Motorsports		11									21	6

==== Prototype Challenge ====
Pos.	Team	**DAY**	**SEB**	LBH	LGA	BEL	**WGL**	MOS	LIM	ELK	AUS	**ATL**	Points	NAEC
1	No. 8 Starworks Motorsport	4	3	2	2	1	**1**	2	1	6	1	6	355	30
2	No. 52 PR1/Mathiasen Motorsports	2	2	6	**1**	**3**	5	3	2	1	**2**	**1**	355	**47**
3	No. 38 Performance Tech Motorsports	6	5	**3**	4	4	2	4	3	**3**	3	2	330	**36**
4	No. 85 JDC-Miller MotorSports	1	4	1	5	7	4	5	6	7	6	3	317	**38**
5	No. 20 BAR1 Motorsports	**3**	6	4	6	5	7	6	4	5	4	5	302	30
6	No. 88 Starworks Motorsport	7	7	5	7	6	3	7	5	9	8	4	287	27
7	No. 54 CORE Autosport	8	**1**	7	3	2	6	**1**	**8**	2			268	24
8	No. 7 Starworks Motorsport								7	4	5	7	106	6
9	No. 26 BAR1 Motorsports	5								8	7		76	10

==== GT Le Mans ====
Pos.	Team	**DAY**	**SEB**	LBH	LGA	**WGL**	MOS	LIM	ELK	VIR	AUS	**ATL**	Points	NAEC
1	No. 4 Corvette Racing	1	1	2	7	4	2	1	1	9	5	3	345	**38**
2	No. 67 Ford Chip Ganassi Racing	9	5	4	1	**1**	1	**3**	2	4	**9**	**7**	328	**32**
3	No. 3 Corvette Racing	2	9	9	4	7	**3**	2	6	**1**	3	4	319	29
4	No. 912 Porsche North America	3	3	7	3	10	6	8	4	3	1	5	313	32
5	No. 62 Risi Competizione	6	4	3	5	6	7	4	5	7	8	1	305	**32**
6	No. 66 Ford Chip Ganassi Racing	7	8	8	6	2	5	5	**9**	2	6	2	301	32
7	No. 25 BMW Team RLL	5	**2**	**5**	9	3	4	7	8	5	4	9	298	32
8	No. 911 Porsche North America	**8**	10	1	8	9	8	6	7	6	2	10	285	32
9	No. 100 BMW Team RLL	11	6	10	10	8	9	9	3	8	7	6	267	26
10	No. 68 Scuderia Corsa	4	7	6	**2**	5						8	164	27
11	No. 72 SMP Racing	10											22	8

==== GT Daytona ====
Pos.	Team	**DAY**	**SEB**	LGA	BEL	**WGL**	MOS	LIM	ELK	VIR	AUS	**ATL**	Points	NAEC
1	No. 63 Scuderia Corsa	6	**1**	2	3	1	4	11	3	7	3	2	332	**35**
2	No. 33 Riley Motorsports	9	12	6	1	4	11	3	1	6	13	**1**	303	30
3	No. 48 Paul Miller Racing	16^{1}	6	7	**8**	12	3	4	8	**1**	2	4	293	29
4	No. 6 Stevenson Motorsports	14	8	4	5	11	2	2	5	3	10	7	290	25
5	No. 23 Team Seattle / Alex Job Racing	8	4	**1**	4	**3**	**12**	14	**12**	4	**7**	8	285	**35**
6	No. 96 Turner Motorsport	22^{2}	2	5	9	13	1	6	7	11	1	9	279	26
7	No. 44 Magnus Racing	1	3	13	10	2	10	1	4	21	4	11^{3}	278	**38**
8	No. 9 Stevenson Motorsports	7	16	9	13	6	9	5	6	2	12	5	265	32
9	No. 97 Turner Motorsport	5	7	12	11	10	13	7	9	8	14	3	255	27
10	No. 16 Change Racing	18^{1}	11	10	6	9	5	**8**	14	5	9	10	247	26
11	No. 73 Park Place Motorsports	**17**	17	11	2	8	6	10	2		5	12^{4}	236	27
12	No. 22 Alex Job Racing	13	5	8	7	5	7	9	11				190	18
13	No. 27 Dream Racing		19	16	12	DNS	8	13	15	10	11	6	178	12
14	No. 540 Black Swan Racing	2	13	17	WD	7		12					112	20
15	No. 80 Lone Star Racing			14					10	9	8		87	–
16	No. 007 TRG-AMR	20		3							6		69	9
17	No. 98 Aston Martin Racing	4	10										51	16
18	No. 11 O'Gara Motorsport/Change Racing	15^{1}	18	15									48	14
19	No. 51 Spirit of Race	11	9										44	14
20	No. 28 Konrad Motorsport	10^{1}	14										40	14
21	No. 93 Riley Motorsports	3											31	9
22	No. 45 Flying Lizard Motorsports	19	15										30	14
23	No. 30 Frikadelli Racing	12											20	8
24	No. 77 Alex Job Racing								13				19	–
25	No. 21 Konrad Motorsport	21^{1}											11	8

Notes

- ^{1} – All teams using Lamborghini Huracán GT3-cars were penalized with five minutes added to their total time due to BoP-regulations.
- ^{2} – Car No. 96 of Turner Motorsport was put to the back of its class for exceeding the maximum drive-time limitation.
- ^{3} – Car No. 44 of Magnus Racing was put to second to last in its class for a minimum drive-time violation.
- ^{4} – Car No. 73 of Park Place Motorsports was put to last in its class for a minimum drive-time violation.

=== Manufacturers' championships ===
Race is part of the North American Endurance Cup

==== Prototype ====
Pos.	Manufacturer	**DAY**	**SEB**	LBH	LGA	BEL	**WGL**	MOS	ELK	AUS	**ATL**	Points	NAEC
1	Chevrolet	2	2	**1**	2	**1**	1	1	1	**1**	3	338	**53**
2	Honda	1	**1**	7	1	5	**3**	6	4	6	**1**	324	**55**
3	Mazda	10	6	4	**4**	3	5	**5**	**5**	4	6	304	**31**
4	BMW	8	10				DNS					56	15
5	Ford	5										30	12
Manufacturers ineligible for championship points
	Nissan	**9**	4									0	0

==== GT Le Mans ====
Pos.	Manufacturer	**DAY**	**SEB**	LBH	LGA	**WGL**	MOS	LIM	ELK	VIR	AUS	**ATL**	Points	NAEC
1	Chevrolet	1	1	2	4	4	**2**	1	1	**1**	3	3	359	**42**
2	Ford	7	5	4	1	**1**	1	**3**	**2**	2	**6**	**2**	341	**38**
3	Porsche	**3**	3	1	3	9	6	6	4	3	1	5	330	37
4	Ferrari	4	4	3	**2**	5	7	4	5	7	8	1	317	**40**
5	BMW	5	**2**	**5**	9	3	4	7	3	5	4	6	314	35

==== GT Daytona ====
Pos.	Manufacturer	**DAY**	**SEB**	LGA	BEL	**WGL**	MOS	LIM	ELK	VIR	AUS	**ATL**	Points	NAEC
1	Audi	1	3	4	5	2	2	1	4	2	4	5	334	**45**
2	Ferrari	7	**1**	2	3	1	4	11	3	7	3	2	328	**36**
3	Porsche	**2**	4	**1**	2	**3**	**6**	9	**2**	4	**5**	8	322	**42**
4	Dodge	3	12	6	1	4	11	3	1	6	13	**1**	321	31
5	BMW	6	2	5	9	10	1	6	7	8	1	3	313	29
6	Lamborghini	5^{1}	6	7	**6**	9	3	**4**	8	**1**	2	4	282	21
7	Aston Martin	4	10	3							6		108	18

Notes

- ^{1} – Lamborghini was unable to score at Daytona as they were penalized due to BoP-regulations.
