= Nur Ali =

American racing driver from Pakistan

- Born: October 12, 1974 (age 52); Karachi, Pakistan
- Achievements: 2001, 2002 Southwest Formula Mazda Champion

NASCAR O'Reilly Auto Parts Series career
- 1 race run over 1 year
- 2012 position: 93rd
- Best finish: 93rd (2012)
- First race: 2012 Kansas Lottery 300 (Kansas)
Wins	Top tens	Poles
0	0	0
- Statistics up to date as of February 28, 2013.

Nur B. Ali (Urdu: نو ر علی ) (born October 12, 1974 in Karachi, Pakistan) is a Pakistani American race car driver. He is the first Pakistani to become a professional racing driver, and a former two-time Southwest Formula Mazda Series Champion. Ali also drove in the A1 Grand Prix series for Team Pakistan.

== Early life ==
Ali was interested in racing since he was four years old when he lived in Germany. He moved to Texas with his family when he was eight years old and he currently resides in Dallas suburb of Irving.

Ali graduated with a Bachelor of Arts degree in International Relations from American University in Washington, D.C. in 1998. He was Vice President of Washington, D.C. Federation of College Republicans in 1995 and interned for Congressman Joe Barton, R-Texas, in Washington, D.C. in 1995.

== Racing career ==
After graduating from college, Ali pursued a career racing by going to Skip Barber Racing School. When he completed the course and picked up his racing license, Ali took part in the Skip Barber Formula Dodge Southern Race Series and becoming the first racing driver from Pakistan. In 2000, Ali and his brother set up Ali Motorsports, so that he could compete in the Southwest Formula Mazda Series which he won in 2001 and 2002. Then in 2006, he joined racing series A1 Grand Prix where he raced for A1 Team Pakistan for a season. In late 2007, Nur decided to switch to stock car racing, and after a successful test for Cunningham Motorsports, Ali drove in the 2008 Daytona ARCA 200. In 2009, he drove again for Cunningham Motorsports. After joining the ARCA RE/MAX Series, Texas Governor Rick Perry presented Ali with an official commendation, and the Mayor of the city of Southlake, Texas, proclaimed January 25, 2008 as Nur Ali Day.

In 2012, Ali made his debut in the NASCAR Nationwide Series, driving for Rick Ware Racing in two events late in the season, but wrecked three cars in his first career start at Kansas Speedway and then was not cleared to race in his next attempt at Texas Motor Speedway.

Ali currently competes in the Global RallyCross Championship Lites series.

== Racing record ==
Season	Series	Team	Races	wins	Poles	Fast laps	Points	Pos.
2010	ARCA RE/MAX Series	DGM Racing	1	0	0	0	120	112th
2009	ARCA RE/MAX Series	Cunningham Motorsports	3	0	0	0	220	97th
2008	Southwest Formula Mazda	Ali Motorsports	2	0	0	0	30	18th
2008	ARCA RE/MAX Series	Cunningham Motorsports	2	0	0	0	420	63rd
2008	Southwest Formula Mazda	Ali Motorsports	4	2	2	0	108	3rd
2007	Star Mazda	Ali Motorsports	1	0	0	0	16	31st
2007	Southwest Formula Mazda	Ali Motorsports	4	1	2	0	86	6th
2006–07	A1 Grand Prix	A1 Team Pakistan	20	0	0	0	1	22nd (1)
2006	Southwest Formula Mazda	Ali Motorsports	3	0	1	0	64	8th
2006	Star Mazda	Ali Motorsports	6	0	0	0	78	32nd
2006	Star Mazda Expert Series	Ali Motorsports	6	0	0	0	73	5th
2004	Southwest Formula Mazda	Ali Motorsports	6	0	0	0	82	17th
2003	Southwest Formula Mazda	Ali Motorsports	11	0	1	0	193	4th
2002 (Fall)	Southwest Formula Mazda	Ali Motorsports	5	3	1	0	64	1st
2002	Southwest Formula Mazda	Ali Motorsports	14	0	1	0	240	3rd
2001 (Fall)	Southwest Formula Mazda	Ali Motorsports	6	1	0	0	138	1st
2001	Southwest Formula Mazda	Ali Motorsports	11	0	0	0	192	7th
2000	Southwest Formula Mazda	Ali Motorsports	9	0	0	0	143	5th

- (1) = Team standings.

=== NASCAR ===
(key) (Bold – Pole position awarded by qualifying time. Italics – Pole position earned by points standings or practice time. * – Most laps led.)

==== Nationwide Series ====
NASCAR Nationwide Series results
Year	Team	No.	Make	1	2	3	4	5	6	7	8	9	10	11	12	13	14	15	16	17	18	19	20	21	22	23	24	25	26	27	28	29	30	31	32	33	NNSC	Pts	Ref
2012	Rick Ware Racing	41	Chevy	DAY	PHO	LVS	BRI	CAL	TEX	RCH	TAL	DAR	IOW	CLT	DOV	MCH	ROA	KEN	DAY	NHA	CHI	IND	IOW	GLN	CGV	BRI	ATL	RCH	CHI	KEN	DOV	CLT	KAN; 33	TEX			92nd	11	
2012	Rick Ware Racing	70	Chevy																																PHO; QL^{†}	HOM	92nd	11	
^{†} - Qualified for Timmy Hill

=== ARCA Racing Series ===
(key) (Bold – Pole position awarded by qualifying time. Italics – Pole position earned by points standings or practice time. * – Most laps led.)

ARCA Racing Series results
Year	Team	No.	Make	1	2	3	4	5	6	7	8	9	10	11	12	13	14	15	16	17	18	19	20	21	ARSC	Pts	Ref
2008	Cunningham Motorsports	45	Dodge	DAY; 23	SLM	IOW	KAN	CAR	KEN	TOL	POC	MCH	CAY	KEN	BLN	POC	NSH	ISF	DSF	CHI	SLM	NJE	TAL	TOL; 35	63rd	420	
2009	Cunningham Motorsports	45	Dodge	DAY; 38	SLM																				97th	220	
2009	Derrike Cope, Inc.	14	Dodge			CAR; 21	TAL	KEN	TOL	POC															97th	220	
2009	Derrike Cope, Inc.	17	Dodge								MCH; 35	MFD	IOW	KEN	BLN	POC	ISF	CHI	TOL	DSF	NJE	SLM	KAN	CAR	97th	220	
2010	DGM Racing	10	Chevy	DAY	PBE	SLM	TEX; 22	TAL	TOL	POC	MCH	IOW	MFD	POC	BLN	NJE	ISF	CHI	DSF	TOL	SLM	KAN	CAR		112th	120	

=== Complete A1 Grand Prix results ===
(key) (Races in bold indicate pole position) (Races in italics indicate fastest lap)

A1 Grand Prix results
Year	Entrant	1	2	3	4	5	6	7	8	9	10	11	12	13	14	15	16	17	18	19	20	21	22	DC	Points
2006–07	Pakistan	NED; SPR; 20	NED; FEA; Ret	CZE; SPR; 20	CZE; FEA; Ret	CHN; SPR; 21	CHN; FEA; Ret	MYS; SPR; 18	MYS; FEA; 21	IDN; SPR; 20	IDN; FEA; 15	NZL; SPR; 18	NZL; FEA; 18	AUS; SPR; 20	AUS; FEA; Ret	RSA; SPR; 18	RSA; FEA; 10	MEX; SPR; 15	MEX; FEA; 21	CHN; SPR; 20	CHN; FEA; 18	GBR; SPR; Ret	GBR; SPR; 17	22nd	1

=== Complete Global RallyCross Championship results ===
==== GRC Lites ====
Year	Entrant	Car	1	2	3	4	5	6	7	8	9	10	11	12	Lites	Points
2015	AF Racing	Lites Ford Fiesta	FTA; 6	DAY1; 6	DAY2; 9	MCAS; 9	DET1; 10	DET2; 4	DC; 7	LA1; 6	LA2; 7	BAR1; 9	BAR2; 7	LV; 13	7th	226
2016	Rhys Millen Racing	Lites Ford Fiesta	PHO1	PHO2	DAL; 12	DAY1	DAY2	MCAS1	MCAS2^{†}	DC	AC	SEA	LA1	LA2	22nd	3

^{†}Race cancelled.

Sporting positions
Preceded by Quad Boenker	Southwest Formula Mazda champion 2001 (Fall)	Succeeded by Brad Pollard
Preceded by Brad Pollard	Southwest Formula Mazda champion 2002 (Fall)	Succeeded by Darryl Wills
