= Tristan Vautier =

French racing driver (born 1989)

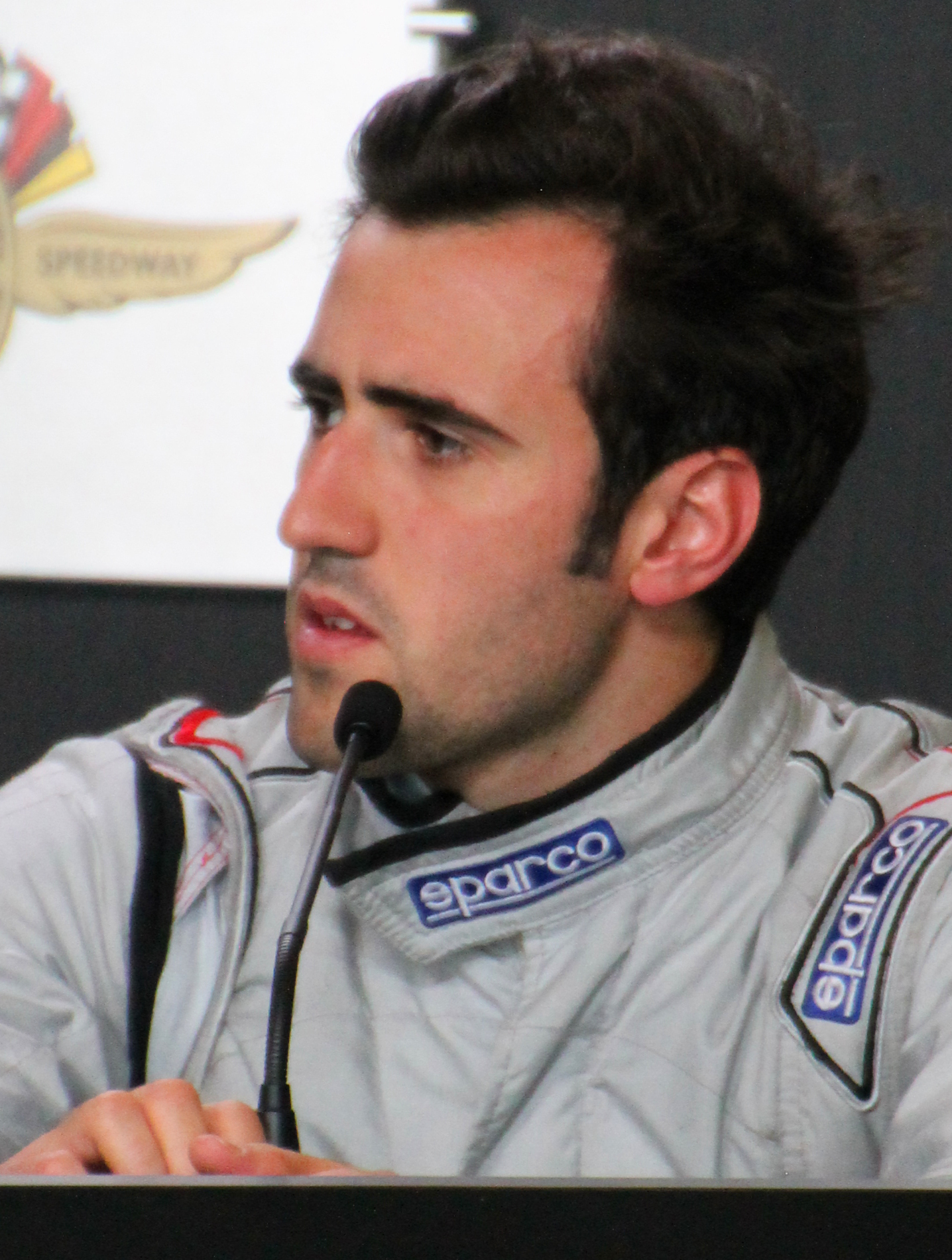
- Vautier at the Indianapolis Motor Speedway in 2015
- Nationality: (France) French
- Born: Tristan Philippe Alain Vautier; 22 August 1989 (age 37) Saint-Martin-d'Hères, Isère, France

IMSA SportsCar Championship career
- Debut season: 2014
- Current team: Tower Motorsports
- Categorisation: FIA Gold (until 2013, 2016–); FIA Platinum (2014–2015)
- Car number: 5
- Former teams: Meyer Shank Racing, Proton Competition, JDC–Miller MotorSports, Mustang Samping Racing, Spirit of Daytona Racing, SunEnergy1 Racing, Stevenson Motorsports, SpeedSource
- Starts: 70
- Wins: 1
- Podiums: 9
- Poles: 2
- Fastest laps: 3
- Best finish: 6th in 2021, 2022

IndyCar Series career
- 32 races run over 4 years
- Team: No. 51 (Dale Coyne Racing)
- Best finish: 20th (2013)
- First race: 2013 Grand Prix of St. Petersburg (St. Petersburg)
- Last race: 2024 Detroit Grand Prix (Detroit)
Wins	Podiums	Poles
0	0	0

Previous series
- 2012 2010–2011 2009 2009 2008 2007–09 2007 2006: Firestone Indy Lights; Star Mazda Championship; FIA Formula Two; Formula Palmer Audi; Formula Renault 2.0 WEC; Eurocup Formula Renault 2.0; Formula Renault 2.0 France; Formula Renault Campus

Championship titles
- 2018 2012 2011: Intercontinental GT Challenge; Firestone Indy Lights; Star Mazda Championship

Awards
- 2013: IndyCar Series Rookie of the Year

Tristan Philippe Alain Vautier (born 22 August 1989) is a French professional racing driver who is currently competing in the 2025 IMSA SportsCar Championship for Proton Competition and in the 2025 European Le Mans Series for CLX – Pure Rxcing.

== Racing career ==
=== Formula Renault ===
Born in Saint-Martin-d'Hères, Isère, Vautier began his career in the French Formula Renault Campus series in 2006, where he finished runner-up. He moved up to the main Championnat de France Formula Renault 2.0 series in 2007, finishing fourth, also competing in some events in the Eurocup Formula Renault 2.0, scoring a second and third in Zolder. In 2008, the French series was replaced by the West European Cup, in which Vautier finished sixth.

=== Formula Palmer Audi ===
Vautier moved to the Formula Palmer Audi series in 2009, where he finished fourth with six victories.

=== FIA Formula Two Championship ===
Vautier made his FIA Formula Two Championship debut at Circuit de Catalunya, in place of Edoardo Piscopo. Vautier excelled in the pre-race tests and in the first race, where he finished third behind Andy Soucek and Mikhail Aleshin. He also finished in the points in the second race, finishing sixth. Those two results were enough to place him thirteenth overall in the championship standings.

=== Star Mazda ===
2010 saw Vautier move to the American Star Mazda Championship driving for Andersen Racing. Vautier won the season-opener at Sebring Raceway and then in June at New Jersey Motorsports Park. However, several mechanical issues saw him achieve only fifth in the final standings despite being the only driver other than champion Conor Daly to win more than one race. He returned to the series in 2011, this time driving for JDC MotorSports. He won four races and finished every race in the top-five, winning the championship over Connor De Phillippi by 25 points. With the title, he won a scholarship to move to Firestone Indy Lights in 2012 through the Road to Indy program.

=== Indy Lights ===
Vautier signed with Sam Schmidt Motorsports to race in Firestone Indy Lights in 2012. He won the pole in his first race on the Streets of St. Petersburg and took a flag-to-flag victory, duplicating his Star Mazda feat from two years before by winning on debut. Another win on the Milwaukee Mile came in the midst of a remarkable run of twenty consecutive top-five finishes (including the final two Star Mazda events of 2010, and his championship season of 2011) in his Road to Indy career. The streak ended at Toronto when a first-lap collision put him out of the race for the first time in an open-wheel car in nearly two years.

Vautier clinched the 2012 Firestone Indy Lights championship by eight points over Esteban Guerrieri. With his title win, he won a partial scholarship to compete in the IndyCar Series in 2013 through the Road to Indy program.

=== IndyCar ===
Vautier signed to compete in the 2013 IndyCar Series season for Schmidt Peterson Motorsports. He is the first driver to be champion of two rungs of the Road to Indy ladder and move onto the IndyCar Series. Vautier finished twentieth in points with a best finish of tenth in the second race of the season at Barber Motorsports Park. Vautier qualified in the Firestone Fast-Six on his debut race in St Petersburg, and third for the following round in Barber. He won rookie of the year honours. He finished sixteenth in his first Indianapolis 500 race.

Vautier returned to IndyCar in 2015 as a part-time driver for Dale Coyne Racing. He qualified James Davison's car for the Indianapolis 500, then raced in place of Carlos Huertas. A week later, he finished fourth in Detroit for the second race, starting last on the grid after qualifying was cancelled. His showing got Dale Coyne to keep him in the car for the remainder of the season, and he backed his strong Detroit result with a sixth place in Mid-Ohio.

In 2017, Vautier returned to IndyCar for a one-off, subbing for injured Sébastien Bourdais in Texas. Vautier went on to qualify fifth in the Dale Coyne Racing entry, and led 15 laps in the race before being caught in a multi-car incident.

Vautier returned to IndyCar in 2024, making a start at Detroit driving the No. 51 Honda for Dale Coyne.

=== Sports car racing ===
Vautier debuted Sports Car racing while still racing open wheels, in the 2009 French GT Championship, and won on his debut race in Nogaro, teaming-up with French driver Jean-Charles Levy.

In 2014, Vautier was hired by the Mazda factory team to race at the four endurance races of the 2014 United SportsCar Championship in a LMP2 diesel prototype. At the 2015 24 Hours of Daytona, he joined JDC/Miller, resulting third in the Prototype Challenge class.

Vautier has completed the 24 Hours of Spa five times for team Akka-ASP, in 2012, 2014, 2016, 2017 and 2018, finishing second overall in 2016 on an AMG-Factory backed car alongside Rosenqvist and Van der Zande. He ended the 2016 season by winning the Blancpain GT Sprint final race in Barcelona, teamed-up with Rosenqvist.

Vautier returned to full-time racing in the US in 2017 with Mercedes-AMG customer Team SunEnergy1 racing, teaming-up with Team owner Kenny Habul, and Boris Said. Vautier set Sebring's GTD track record on his way to pole position for the 12-Hour race, before finishing on the podium after a late comeback in the closing stages. He also returned to the Blanpain GT Series with Team Akka-ASP, teaming-up with Mercedes driver Daniel Juncadella and open wheel ace Felix Serralles, closing the season by a win in Barcelona just as he did in 2016.

In 2018, Vautier raced in prototypes alongside of his GT duties as Mercedes-AMG Factory driver, joining American Matt McMurry behind the wheel of the No. 90 Cadillac DPi-V.R. in the IMSA WeatherTech SportsCar Championship, driving for Spirit of Daytona Racing at four races, where he scored pole position for the 12 Hours of Sebring. At 2018 Petit Le Mans, he finished fourth overall for Action Express Racing, partnering with Filipe Albuquerque and Christian Fittipaldi.

Vautier's GT Racing campaign for Mercedes-AMG saw him clinch the Intercontinental GT Challenge during the title-deciding race in WeatherTech Raceway Laguna Seca, scoring a second place in the Bathurst 12 Hours and a win in the Suzuka 10 Hours.

Vautier also debuted on the Nordschleife, finishing in the top-ten in the 24 Hours of Nurburgring for Team Landgraff.

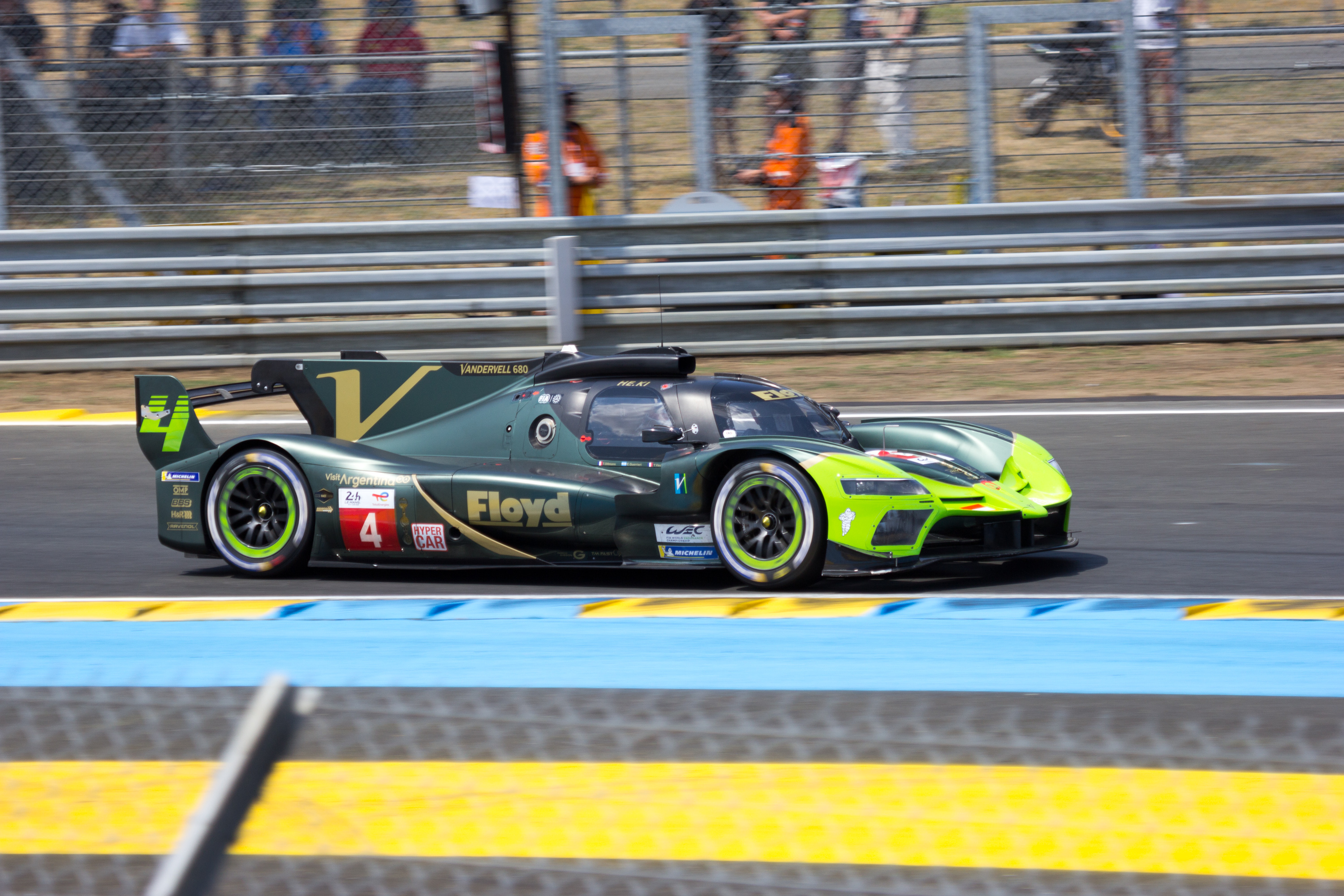
Vautier competing at the 2023 24 Hours of Le Mans.

In 2019, Vautier joined JDC-Miller MotorSports to drive a Cadillac DPi at the IMSA WeatherTech Championship together with Mikhail Goikhberg, where he scored two fifth-place finishes. He continued racing in GT3 as a Mercedes Factory driver for Team Strakka in the InterContinental GT and Team GetSpeed in the VLN Series and Nurburgring 24 Hours.

The next season, Vautier had multiple co-drivers, but scored four top-fives.

Vautier won the 2021 12 Hours of Sebring with JDC, together with Loïc Duval and Sébastien Bourdais.

In 2022, Vautier scored pole and finished third in the Rolex 24 Hours at Daytona teaming with Loïc Duval, Richard Westbrook and Ben Keating. He finished second in the Sebring 12 Hours teaming with Westbrook and Duval.

Vautier represented ARC Bratislava in LMP2 at the 24 Hours of Le Mans, leading the pro-am class for most of the race before being taken out of contention by a radiator failure.

In 2023, Vautier competed in the European Le Mans Series with Algarve Pro Racing, later also making his Hypercar debut in the FIA World Endurance Championship, having been called up by Vanwall to replace Jacques Villeneuve. Despite Vanwall's exit from WEC after a year, Vautier remained involved in LMH as Cadillac Racing's reserve driver for the 2024 24 Hours of Le Mans.

== Racing record ==
=== Career summary ===
Season	Series	Team	Races	Wins	Poles	F/Laps	Podiums	Points	Position
2007	French Formula Renault 2.0	Graff Racing	13	0	0	0	3	69	4th
2007	Eurocup Formula Renault 2.0	Graff Racing	6	0	0	0	2	22	15th
2008	Formula Renault 2.0 WEC	Epsilon Sport	15	0	0	0	2	79	6th
2008	Eurocup Formula Renault 2.0	Epsilon Sport	2	0	0	0	0	1	29th
2009	FIA Formula Two Championship	MSV Racing	2	0	0	0	1	9	13th
2009	Formula Palmer Audi	MSV Racing	20	6	5	6	9	303	4th
2009	Eurocup Formula Renault 2.0	iQuick Valencia	2	0	0	0	0	0	NC†
2010	Star Mazda Championship	Andersen Racing	13	2	0	0	3	400	5th
2011	Star Mazda Championship	JDC MotorSports	11	4	5	4	6	426	**1st**
2012	Indy Lights	Sam Schmidt Motorsports	12	4	5	3	7	461	**1st**
2012	Blancpain Endurance Series - Pro-Am Cup	SOFREV Auto Sport Promotion	1	0	0	0	0	12	36th
2013	IndyCar Series	Schmidt Peterson Hamilton HP Motorsports	19	0	0	0	0	266	20th
2013	Rolex Sports Car Series - GX	SpeedSource	1	0	0	0	0	25	14th
2014	United SportsCar Championship - P	SpeedSource	4	0	0	0	0	59	30th
2014	Blancpain Endurance Series - Pro-Am Cup	SOFREV Auto Sport Promotion	1	0	0	0	0	2	35th
2015	United SportsCar Championship - P	JDC-Miller MotorSports	1	0	0	0	1	1	36th
2015	IndyCar Series	Dale Coyne Racing	11	0	0	0	0	175	22nd
2015	Blancpain Endurance Series - Pro Cup	AKKA ASP	2	0	0	0	0	9	21st
2015	Blancpain Endurance Series - Pro-Am Cup	AKKA ASP	1	0	0	0	0	2	28th
2016	IMSA SportsCar Championship - GTD	Stevenson MotorSports	1	0	0	0	0	25	47th
2016	Blancpain GT Series Endurance Cup	AKKA ASP	2	0	0	0	0	18	22nd
2016	Blancpain GT Series Sprint Cup	AKKA ASP	10	1	1	1	3	51	7th
2017	IMSA SportsCar Championship - GTD	SunEnergy1 Racing	12	0	1	2	2	224	19th
2017	IndyCar Series	Dale Coyne Racing	1	0	0	0	0	15	36th
2017	Blancpain GT Series Endurance Cup	AKKA ASP	4	1	1	0	1	26	16th
2017	Blancpain GT Series Sprint Cup - Pro-Am Cup	AKKA ASP	2	0	0	0	1	18	7th
2018	IMSA SportsCar Championship - P	Spirit of Daytona Racing	4	0	1	0	0	96	24th
2018	IMSA SportsCar Championship - P	Mustang Sampling Racing	1	0	0	0	0	96	24th
2018	Blancpain GT Series Endurance Cup	Mercedes-AMG Team AKKA ASP	4	1	1	0	1	51	**3rd**
2018	Blancpain GT Series Sprint Cup - Pro-Am Cup	SunEnergy1 Racing	1	1	0	0	1	16.5	5th
2018	24 Hours of Nürburgring - SP9	Landgraf Motorsport	1	0	0	0	0	N/A	9th
2018	Intercontinental GT Challenge	Mercedes-AMG Team SunEnergy1 Racing	2	0	0	0	2	73	**1st**
2018	Intercontinental GT Challenge	Mercedes-AMG Team AKKA ASP	1	0	0	0	1	73	**1st**
2018	Intercontinental GT Challenge	Mercedes-AMG Team GruppeM Racing	1	1	1	0	1	73	**1st**
2019	IMSA SportsCar Championship - DPi	JDC-Miller MotorSports	10	0	0	0	0	230	11th
2019	Blancpain GT Series Endurance Cup	Mercedes-AMG Team Strakka Racing	1	0	0	0	0	0	NC
2019	24 Hours of Nürburgring - SP9 Pro	GetSpeed Performance	1	0	0	0	0	N/A	DNF
2020	IMSA SportsCar Championship - DPi	JDC-Miller MotorSports	9	0	0	0	0	226	9th
2021	IMSA SportsCar Championship - DPi	JDC-Miller MotorSports	10	1	0	1	2	2933	6th
2022	IMSA SportsCar Championship - DPi	JDC-Miller MotorSports	10	0	0	0	3	2979	6th
2022	FIA World Endurance Championship - LMP2	ARC Bratislava	1	0	0	0	0	0	27th
2022	24 Hours of Le Mans - LMP2	ARC Bratislava	1	0	0	0	0	N/A	21st
2022	GT World Challenge Europe Sprint Cup	AKKodis ASP Team	2	0	0	1	0	0	NC
2022	Intercontinental GT Challenge	US RaceTronics	1	0	0	0	0	0	NC
2023	FIA World Endurance Championship - Hypercar	Floyd Vanwall Racing Team	4	0	0	0	0	0	21st
2023	24 Hours of Le Mans - Hypercar	Floyd Vanwall Racing Team	1	0	0	0	0	N/A	DNF
2023	European Le Mans Series - LMP2 Pro-Am	Algarve Pro Racing	6	0	0	0	0	38	9th
2024	IndyCar Series	Dale Coyne Racing with Rick Ware Racing	1	0	0	0	0	12	38th
2024	European Le Mans Series - LMP2 Pro-Am	Team Virage	3	0	0	0	0	22	12th
2024	24 Hours of Le Mans - Hypercar	Cadillac Racing	Reserve driver						
2024–25	Asian Le Mans Series - LMP2	RD Limited	6	1	0	1	4	88	**2nd**
2025	IMSA SportsCar Championship - GTP	Proton Competition	2	0	0	0	0	776	23rd
2025	IMSA SportsCar Championship - GTP	Acura Meyer Shank Racing with Curb-Agajanian	1	0	0	0	0	776	23rd
2025	European Le Mans Series - LMP2	CLX – Pure Rxcing	5	0	0	0	0	15	13th
2025	24 Hours of Le Mans - LMP2	CLX – Pure Rxcing	1	0	0	0	0	N/A	14th
2025–26	Asian Le Mans Series - LMP2	RD Limited	6	0	0	2	2	52	5th
2026	IMSA SportsCar Championship - LMP2	Tower Motorsports	5	0	0	0	1	1464	18th
2026	European Le Mans Series - LMP2	Algarve Pro Racing	4	0	0	0	1	29	12th
2026	European Le Mans Series - LMP2 Pro-Am	DKR Engineering	1	0	1	0	0	11	14th
2026	24 Hours of Le Mans - LMP2 Pro-Am	RD Limited	1	0	0	0	0	N/A	8th

† As Vautier was a guest driver, he was ineligible for points.

=== Complete Eurocup Formula Renault 2.0 results ===
(key) (Races in bold indicate pole position; races in italics indicate fastest lap)

Year	Entrant	1	2	3	4	5	6	7	8	9	10	11	12	13	14	DC	Points
2007	Graff Racing	ZOL; 1; 2	ZOL; 2; 3	NÜR; 1; 19	NÜR; 2; 19	HUN; 1	HUN; 2	DON; 1	DON; 2	MAG; 1; 13	MAG; 2 Ret	EST; 1	EST; 2	CAT; 1	CAT; 2	15th	22
2008	Epsilon Sport	SPA; 1; 25	SPA; 2; 10	SIL; 1	SIL; 2	HUN; 1	HUN; 2	NÜR; 1	NÜR; 2	LMS; 1	LMS; 2	EST; 1	EST; 2	CAT; 1	CAT; 2	29th	1
2009	iQuick Valencia	CAT; 1	CAT; 2	SPA; 1	SPA; 2	HUN; 1	HUN; 2	SIL; 1	SIL; 2	LMS; 1	LMS; 2	NÜR; 1	NÜR; 2	ALC; 1; 17	ALC; 2; 13	NC†	0

† As Vautier was a guest driver, he was ineligible for points

=== American open–wheel racing results ===
(key)

==== Star Mazda Championship ====
Year	Team	1	2	3	4	5	6	7	8	9	10	11	12	13	Rank	Points
2010	Andersen Racing	SEB; 1	STP; 9	LAG; 15	IND; 6	IOW; 8	NJ1; 6	NJ2; 1	ACC1; 23	ACC2; 2	TRO; 11	ROA; 13	MOS; 4	ATL; 5	5th	400
2011	JDC MotorSports	STP; 3	**BAR**; 1	IND; 4	MIL; 4	IOW; 4	MOS; 5	**TRO1**; 1	**TRO2**; 3	**SON**; 1	**BAL**; 1	LAG; 5			1st	426

==== Indy Lights ====
Year	Team	1	2	3	4	5	6	7	8	9	10	11	12	Rank	Points	Ref
2012	Sam Schmidt Motorsports	**STP**; 1	ALA; 2	LBH; 3	INDY; 3	DET; 5	**MIL**; 1	**IOW**; 4	TOR; 11	EDM; 6	**TRO**; 1	**BAL**; 1	FON; 4	1st	461	

==== IndyCar Series ====
(key)

Year	Team	No.	Chassis	Engine	1	2	3	4	5	6	7	8	9	10	11	12	13	14	15	16	17	18	19	Rank	Points	Ref
2013	Schmidt Peterson Hamilton HP Motorsports	55	Dallara DW12	Honda	STP; 21	ALA; 10	LBH; 17	SAO; 16	INDY; 16	DET; 11	DET; 14	TXS; 18	MIL; 21	IOW; 13	POC; 19	TOR; 19	TOR; 16	MDO; 21	SNM; 12	BAL; 11	HOU; 22	HOU; 11	FON; 21	20th	266	
2015	Dale Coyne Racing	18	Dallara DW12	Honda	STP	NLA	LBH	ALA	IMS	INDY; 28														22nd	175	
2015	Dale Coyne Racing	19	Dallara DW12	Honda							DET; 17	DET; 4	TXS; 20	TOR; 17	FON; 17	MIL; 16	IOW; 12	MDO; 6	POC; 21	SNM; 23				22nd	175	
2017	Dale Coyne Racing	18	Dallara DW12	Honda	STP	LBH	ALA	PHX	IMS	INDY	DET	DET	TXS; 16	ROA	IOW	TOR	MDO	POC	GTW	WGL	SNM			36th	15	
2024	Dale Coyne Racing with Rick Ware Racing	51	Dallara DW12	Honda	STP	THE	LBH	ALA	IMS	INDY	DET; 18	ROA	LAG	MDO	IOW	IOW	TOR	GTW	POR	MIL	MIL	NSH		38th	12	

==== Indianapolis 500 ====
Year	Chassis	Engine	Start	Finish	Team
2013	Dallara	Honda	28	16	Schmidt Peterson Motorsports
2015	Dallara	Honda	32	28	Dale Coyne Racing

=== Complete GT World Challenge Europe results ===
==== GT World Challenge Europe Endurance Cup ====
Year	Team	Car	Class	1	2	3	4	5	6	7	Pos.	Points
2012	SOFREV Auto Sport Promotion	Ferrari 458 Italia GT3	Pro-Am	MNZ	SIL	LEC	SPA; 10	NÜR	NAV		36th	12
2014	SOFREV Auto Sport Promotion	Ferrari 458 Italia GT3	Pro-Am	MNZ	SIL	LEC	SPA; 6H; 17	SPA; 12H; 37	SPA; 24H; 22	NÜR	35th	2
2015	AKKA ASP	Ferrari 458 Italia GT3	Pro-Am	MNZ; 23							28th	2
2015	AKKA ASP	Ferrari 458 Italia GT3	Pro		SIL	LEC; 7	SPA; 6H	SPA; 12H	SPA; 24H	NÜR; Ret	21st	9
2016	AMG - Team AKKA ASP	Mercedes-AMG GT3	Pro	MNZ	SIL	LEC; Ret	SPA; 6H; 26	SPA; 12H; 12	SPA; 24H; 2	NÜR	18	22nd
2017	AKKA ASP	Mercedes-AMG GT3	Pro	MNZ; 30	**SIL**; 11	LEC	SPA; 6H; 10	SPA; 12H; 46	SPA; 24H; Ret	CAT; 1	16th	26
2018	Mercedes-AMG Team AKKA ASP	Mercedes-AMG GT3	Pro	MNZ; 11	SIL; 2	LEC	SPA; 6H; 15	SPA; 12H; 3	SPA; 24H; 6	CAT; 2	3rd	51
2019	Mercedes-AMG Team Strakka Racing	Mercedes-AMG GT3	Pro	MNZ	SIL	LEC	SPA; 6H; 32	SPA; 12H; 12	SPA; 24H; 20	CAT	NC	0

==== GT World Challenge Europe Sprint Cup ====
Year	Team	Car	Class	1	2	3	4	5	6	7	8	9	10	Pos.	Points
2016	AKKA ASP	Mercedes-AMG GT3	Pro	MIS; QR; 7	MIS; CR; 32	BRH; QR; 9	BRH; CR; 9	NÜR; QR; 27	NÜR; CR; 10	HUN; QR; 2	HUN; CR; 4	CAT; QR; 3	CAT; CR; 1	7th	51
2017	AKKA ASP	Mercedes-AMG GT3	Pro-Am	MIS; QR	MIS; CR	BRH; QR	BRH; CR	ZOL; QR	ZOL; CR	HUN; QR	HUN; CR	NÜR; QR; 27	NÜR; CR; 24	7th	18
2018	SunEnergy1 Racing	Mercedes-AMG GT3	Pro-Am	ZOL; 1	ZOL; 2	BRH; 1	BRH; 2	MIS; 1	MIS; 2	HUN; 1; 15	HUN; 2 DNS	NÜR; 1	NÜR; 2	5th	16.5
2022	AKKodis ASP Team	Mercedes-AMG GT3 Evo	Pro	BRH; 1	BRH; 2	MAG; 1	MAG; 2	ZAN; 1	ZAN; 2	MIS; 1	MIS; 2	VAL; 1; 13	VAL; 2; 12	NC	0

=== Complete Bathurst 12 Hour results ===
Year	Team	Co-Drivers	Car	Class	Laps	Pos.	Class Pos.	Ref
2018	(Australia) Scott Taylor Motorsport (United States) Team SunEnergy1 Racing	(Australia) Kenny Habul (Italy) Raffaele Marciello (Australia) Jamie Whincup	Mercedes-AMG GT3	APP	271	**2nd**	**2nd**	

=== Complete Intercontinental GT Challenge results ===
Year	Manufacturer	Car	1	2	3	4	5	Pos.	Points
2016	Mercedes-Benz	Mercedes-AMG GT3	BAT	SPA; 1	SEP			7th	25
2017	Mercedes-Benz	Mercedes-AMG GT3	BAT	SPA; Ret	LAG			NC	0
2018	Mercedes-AMG	Mercedes-AMG GT3	BAT; 2	SPA; 3	**SUZ**; 1	LAG; 3		1st	73
2019	Mercedes-AMG	Mercedes-AMG GT3	BAT	LAG; Ret	SPA; 13	SUZ; 9	KYA; Ret	35th	2
2022	Mercedes-AMG	Mercedes-AMG GT3 Evo	BAT	SPA	IND; Ret	GUL		NC	0

=== Complete IMSA SportsCar Championship results ===
Year	Team	No.	Class	Chassis	Engine	1	2	3	4	5	6	7	8	9	10	11	12	Rank	Points	Ref
2014	SpeedSource	07	P	Mazda Prototype	Mazda 2.2 L SKYACTIV-D (SH-VPTS) I4 Turbo (diesel)	DAY; 13	SEB; 16	LBH	LGA	DET	WGL; 9	MOS	IMS	ELK	COA	PET; 11		30th	59	
2015	JDC-Miller MotorSports	85	PC	Oreca FLM09	Chevrolet LS3 6.2 L V8	DAY; 3†	SEB	LGA	DET	WGL	MOS	LIM	ELK	COA	PET			36th	1	
2016	Stevenson Motorsports	9	GTD	Audi R8 LMS	Audi 5.2 L V10	DAY; 7	SEB	LGA	DET	WGL	MOS	LIM	ELK	VIR	COA	PET		47th	25	
2017	SunEnergy1 Racing	75	GTD	Mercedes-AMG GT3	Mercedes-AMG M159 6.2 L V8	DAY; 18	**SEB**; 3	LBH; 15	COA; 3	DET; 15	WGL; 15	MOS; 13	LIM; 16	ELK; 12	VIR; 16	LGA; 12	PET; 16	19th	224	
2018	Spirit of Daytona Racing	90	P	Cadillac DPi-V.R	Cadillac 5.5 L V8	DAY; 20	**SEB**; 12	LBH	MDO	DET; 13	WGL; 11	MOS	ELK	LGA				24th	96	
2018	Mustang Sampling Racing	5	P	Cadillac DPi-V.R	Cadillac 5.5 L V8										PET; 4			24th	96	
2019	JDC-Miller MotorSports	85	DPi	Cadillac DPi-V.R	Cadillac 5.5L V8	DAY; 5	SEB; 7	LBH; 9	MDO; 10	DET; 5	WGL; 10	MOS; 9	ELK; 8	LGA; 8	PET; 9			11th	230	
2020	JDC-Miller MotorSports	85	DPi	Cadillac DPi-V.R	Cadillac 5.5 L V8	DAY; 5	DAY; 7	SEB; 8	ELK; 7		MDO; 8							9th	226	
2020	JDC-Miller MotorSports	5	DPi	Cadillac DPi-V.R	Cadillac 5.5 L V8					ATL; 4		PET; 4	LGA; 7	SEB; 5				9th	226	
2021	JDC-Mustang Sampling Racing	5	DPi	Cadillac DPi-V.R	Cadillac 5.5 L V8	DAY; 7	SEB; 1	MDO; 4	DET; 5	WGL; 7	WGL; 4	ELK; 6	LGA; 6	LBH; 3	PET; 7			6th	2933	
2022	JDC-Miller MotorSports	5	DPi	Cadillac DPi-V.R	Cadillac 5.5 L V8	DAY; 3	SEB; 2	LBH; 3	LGA; 4	MDO; 6	DET; 5	WGL; 7	MOS; 5	ELK; 5	PET; 7			6th	2979	
2025	Proton Competition	5	GTP	Porsche 963	Porsche 9RD 4.6 L V8	DAY; 10	SEB; 6	LBH	LGA	DET	WGL	ELK	IMS					23rd	776	
2025	Acura Meyer Shank Racing with Curb-Agajanian	93	GTP	Acura ARX-06	Acura AR24e 2.4 L turbo V6									PET; 7				23rd	776	
2026	Tower Motorsports	8	LMP2	Oreca 07	Gibson GK428 4.2 L V8	DAY	SEB; 3	WGL; 7	MOS	ELK; 5	IMS; 4	PET; 4						18th	1464	

^{†} Vautier did not complete sufficient laps in order to score full points.

=== Complete FIA World Endurance Championship results ===
(key) (Races in bold indicate pole position) (Races in italics indicate fastest lap)

Year	Entrant	Class	Chassis	Engine	1	2	3	4	5	6	7	Rank	Points
2022	ARC Bratislava	LMP2	Oreca 07	Gibson GK428 4.2 L V8	SEB	SPA	LMS; 12	MNZ	FUJ	BHR		27th	0
2023	Floyd Vanwall Racing Team	Hypercar	Vanwall Vandervell 680	Gibson GL458 4.5 L V8	SEB	ALG	SPA	LMS; Ret	MNZ; 12	FUJ; 11	BHR; 12	21st	0

=== Complete 24 Hours of Le Mans results ===
Year	Team	Co-Drivers	Car	Class	Laps	Pos.	Class Pos.
2022	(Slovakia) ARC Bratislava	(Slovakia) Miro Konôpka (Netherlands) Bent Viscaal	Oreca 07-Gibson	LMP2	360	26th	21st
2023	(Austria) Floyd Vanwall Racing Team	(France) Tom Dillmann (Argentina) Esteban Guerrieri	Vanwall Vandervell 680-Gibson	Hypercar	165	DNF	DNF
2025	(Lithuania) CLX – Pure Rxcing	(United Kingdom) Tom Blomqvist (Saint Kitts and Nevis) Alex Malykhin	Oreca 07-Gibson	LMP2	358	32nd	14th
2026	(France) RD Limited	(France) Romain Dumas (United States) Fred Poordad	Oreca 07-Gibson	LMP2	353	30th	16th
2026	(France) RD Limited	(France) Romain Dumas (United States) Fred Poordad	Oreca 07-Gibson	LMP2 Pro-Am	353	30th	8th

=== Complete European Le Mans Series results ===
(key) (Races in bold indicate pole position; results in italics indicate fastest lap)

Year	Entrant	Class	Chassis	Engine	1	2	3	4	5	6	Rank	Points
2023	Algarve Pro Racing	LMP2 Pro-Am	Oreca 07	Gibson GK428 4.2 L V8	CAT; 8	LEC; 8	ARA; 4	SPA; 6	ALG; 7	ALG; 8	9th	38
2024	Team Virage	LMP2 Pro-Am	Oreca 07	Gibson GK428 4.2 L V8	CAT	LEC	IMO	SPA; 7	MUG; 6	ALG; 6	12th	22
2025	CLX – Pure Rxcing	LMP2	Oreca 07	Gibson GK428 4.2 L V8	CAT; 4	LEC; Ret	IMO; 10	SPA; 9	SIL; Ret	ALG	13th	15
2026	Algarve Pro Racing	LMP2	Oreca 07	Gibson GK428 4.2 L V8	CAT; 9	LEC; 9	IMO; 3	SPA; 5	SIL		12th	29
2026	DKR Engineering	LMP2 Pro-Am	Oreca 07	Gibson GK428 4.2 L V8						ALG; 5	14th	11

=== Complete Asian Le Mans Series results ===
(key) (Races in bold indicate pole position) (Races in italics indicate fastest lap)

Year	Team	Class	Car	Engine	1	2	3	4	5	6	Pos.	Points
2024–25	RD Limited	LMP2	Oreca 07	Gibson GK428 4.2 L V8	SEP; 1; 1	SEP; 2; 2	DUB; 1; 6	DUB; 2; 2	ABU; 1; 8	ABU; 2; 3	2nd	88
2025–26	RD Limited	LMP2	Oreca 07	Gibson GK428 4.2 L V8	SEP; 1; 6	SEP; 2; 8	DUB; 1; 3	DUB; 2; 5	ABU; 1; 3	ABU; 2; 12	5th	52

Sporting positions
Preceded by Josef Newgarden	Indy Lights; Champion; 2012	Succeeded by Sage Karam
Preceded by Conor Daly	Star Mazda Championship; Champion; 2011	Succeeded by Jack Hawksworth
Preceded by Simon Pagenaud	IndyCar Series; Rookie of the Year; 2013	Succeeded by Carlos Muñoz
Preceded by Markus Winkelhock	Intercontinental GT Challenge; Champion; 2018	Succeeded by Dennis Olsen
