= 2012 Indy Lights =

2012 Indy Lights season
- Firestone Indy Lights

Season
- Races: 12
- Start date: March 24
- End date: September 15

Awards
- Drivers' champion: (France) Tristan Vautier
- Teams' champion: (United States) Sam Schmidt Motorsports
- Rookie of the Year: (France) Tristan Vautier

The 2012 Indy Lights season was the 27th season of the series and the eleventh sanctioned by IndyCar, acting as the primary support series for the IZOD IndyCar Series. It began March 24, 2012, in St. Petersburg.

The championship was dominated by the Sam Schmidt Motorsports team with French driver Tristan Vautier winning the championship by eight points ahead of experienced Argentine teammate Esteban Guerrieri. SSM drivers won seven out of the twelve races over the course of the season and Vautier also claimed the rookie of the year title. Colombian driver Gustavo Yacamán from Team Moore Racing finished a tight battle for third with countryman Sebastián Saavedra.

== Team and driver chart ==
- All drivers will compete in Firestone Firehawk–shod Dallara chassis.

| Team | No. | Drivers | Rounds |
|---|---|---|---|
| Sam Schmidt Motorsports | 3 | (Brazil) Victor Carbone | All |
| Sam Schmidt Motorsports | 7 | (United Kingdom) Oliver Webb | All |
| Sam Schmidt Motorsports | 11 | (Argentina) Esteban Guerrieri | All |
| Sam Schmidt Motorsports | 77 | (France) Tristan Vautier | All |
| Team Moore Racing | 2 | (Colombia) Gustavo Yacamán | All |
| Team Moore Racing | 22 | (Canada) David Ostella | All |
| Andretti Autosport; AFS Racing | 26 | (Colombia) Carlos Muñoz | All |
| Andretti Autosport; AFS Racing | 27 | (Colombia) Sebastián Saavedra | All |
| Bryan Herta Autosport | 28 | (United States) Troy Castaneda | 1–2 |
| Bryan Herta Autosport | 28 | (United States) Nick Andries | 3 |
| Bryan Herta Autosport | 28 | (Norway) Anders Krohn (Note: In conjunction with Curb Agajanian Performance Group.) | 4, 7 |
| Juncos Racing | 86 | (Brazil) João Victor Horto | 1–2, 4 |
| Juncos Racing | 86 | (Venezuela) Bruno Palli | 12 |
| Juncos Racing | 86 | (United States) Chase Austin | 7 |
| Juncos Racing | 87 | (United States) Chase Austin | 4 |
| Team E | 17 | (United States) Brandon Wagner | 4 |
| Belardi Auto Racing | 4 | (Venezuela) Jorge Goncalvez | All |
| Belardi Auto Racing | 9 | (Israel) Alon Day | 1–7 |
| Belardi Auto Racing | 9 | (Republic of Ireland) Peter Dempsey | 8–12 |
| Belardi Auto Racing | 19 | (United States) Mike Larrison | 4, 6–7, 12 |
| Brooks Associates Racing | 8 | (United Kingdom) Alex Jones | 3 |
| Brooks Associates Racing | 8 | (Hong Kong) Adderly Fong | 11 |
| Fan Force United | 24 | (India) Armaan Ebrahim | 1–5 |
| Fan Force United | 24 | (United States) Bryan Clauson | 6–7 |
| Fan Force United | 24 | (United Kingdom) Stefan Wilson | 12 |
| Fan Force United | 42 | (United States) Emerson Newton-John | 4, 11 |
| Younessi Racing | 15 | (Republic of Ireland) Peter Dempsey | 4–5 |
| Younessi Racing | 16 | (United States) Rodin Younessi | 1, 5 |
| Jeffrey Mark Motorsport | 76 | (Mexico) Juan Pablo Garcia (Note: In technical alliance with Bryan Herta Autosport.) | All |
| Hillenburg Motorsports | 20 | (United States) Darryl Wills | 1–3 |

== Schedule ==
IndyCar announced that all Firestone Indy Lights Series races would be broadcast on the NBC Sports Network in 2012.

| Rnd | Date | Race Name | Track | Location |
|---|---|---|---|---|
| 1 | March 24 | (United States) St. Petersburg 100 | Streets of St. Petersburg | St. Petersburg, Florida |
| 2 | April 1 | (United States) Grand Prix of Alabama | Barber Motorsports Park | Birmingham, Alabama |
| 3 | April 15 | (United States) Grand Prix of Long Beach | Streets of Long Beach | Long Beach, California |
| 4 | May 25 | (United States) Firestone Freedom 100 | Indianapolis Motor Speedway | Speedway, Indiana |
| 5 | June 2 | (United States) Detroit Belle Isle Grand Prix | Belle Isle | Detroit, Michigan |
| 6 | June 15 | (United States) Firestone Indy Lights 100 | Milwaukee Mile | West Allis, Wisconsin |
| 7 | June 22 | (United States) Sukup 100 | Iowa Speedway | Newton, Iowa |
| 8 | July 7 | (Canada) Toronto 100 | Exhibition Place | Toronto, Ontario |
| 9 | July 21 | (Canada) Edmonton 100 | Edmonton City Centre Airport | Edmonton, Alberta |
| 10 | August 5 | (Canada) Grand Prix de Trois-Rivières | Circuit Trois-Rivières | Trois-Rivières, Quebec |
| 11 | September 1 | (United States) Grand Prix of Baltimore | Streets of Baltimore | Baltimore, Maryland |
| 12 | September 15 | (United States) Auto Club Speedway Foundation 100 | Auto Club Speedway | Fontana, California |

Oval/Speedway
Road Course/Street Circuit

== Race results ==
| Rd. | Race | Pole position | Fastest lap | Most laps led | Winning driver | Winning team |
|---|---|---|---|---|---|---|
| 1 | (United States) St. Petersburg | (France) Tristan Vautier | (France) Tristan Vautier | (France) Tristan Vautier | (France) Tristan Vautier | (United States) Sam Schmidt Motorsports |
| 2 | (United States) Barber | (Colombia) Sebastián Saavedra | (Colombia) Sebastián Saavedra | (Colombia) Sebastián Saavedra | (Colombia) Sebastián Saavedra | (United States) Andretti Autosport |
| 3 | (United States) Long Beach | (Colombia) Sebastián Saavedra | (Brazil) Victor Carbone | (Argentina) Esteban Guerrieri | (Argentina) Esteban Guerrieri | (United States) Sam Schmidt Motorsports |
| 4 | (United States) Indianapolis | (Colombia) Gustavo Yacamán | (Brazil) João Victor Horto | (Brazil) Victor Carbone | (Argentina) Esteban Guerrieri | (United States) Sam Schmidt Motorsports |
| 5 | (United States) Belle Isle | (United Kingdom) Oliver Webb | (Colombia) Gustavo Yacamán | (United Kingdom) Oliver Webb | (Colombia) Gustavo Yacamán | (United States) Team Moore Racing |
| 6 | (United States) Milwaukee | (France) Tristan Vautier | (France) Tristan Vautier | (France) Tristan Vautier | (France) Tristan Vautier | (United States) Sam Schmidt Motorsports |
| 7 | (United States) Iowa | (France) Tristan Vautier | (Argentina) Esteban Guerrieri | (France) Tristan Vautier | (Argentina) Esteban Guerrieri | (United States) Sam Schmidt Motorsports |
| 8 | (Canada) Toronto | (Brazil) Victor Carbone | (Colombia) Gustavo Yacamán | (Colombia) Gustavo Yacamán | (Colombia) Gustavo Yacamán | (United States) Team Moore Racing |
| 9 | (Canada) Edmonton | (Colombia) Carlos Muñoz | (Argentina) Esteban Guerrieri | (Colombia) Carlos Muñoz | (Colombia) Carlos Muñoz | (United States) Andretti Autosport |
| 10 | (Canada) Trois-Rivières | (France) Tristan Vautier | (France) Tristan Vautier | (France) Tristan Vautier | (France) Tristan Vautier | (United States) Sam Schmidt Motorsports |
| 11 | (United States) Baltimore | (France) Tristan Vautier | (Colombia) Sebastián Saavedra | (France) Tristan Vautier | (France) Tristan Vautier | (United States) Sam Schmidt Motorsports |
| 12 | (United States) Fontana | (Colombia) Sebastián Saavedra | (Canada) David Ostella | (Colombia) Carlos Muñoz | (Colombia) Carlos Muñoz | (United States) Andretti Autosport |

== Driver standings ==
| Pos | Driver | STP (United States) | BAR (United States) | LBH (United States) | INDY (United States) | DET (United States) | MIL (United States) | IOW (United States) | TOR (Canada) | EDM (Canada) | TRO (Canada) | BAL (United States) | FON (United States) | Pts |
|---|---|---|---|---|---|---|---|---|---|---|---|---|---|---|
| 1 | (France) Tristan Vautier RY | **1*** | 2 | 3 | 3 | 5 | **1*** | **4*** | 11 | 6 | **1*** | **1*** | 4 | 461 |
| 2 | (Argentina) Esteban Guerrieri | 2 | 3 | 1* | 1 | 7 | 3 | 1 | 6 | 3 | 4 | 3 | 3 | 453 |
| 3 | (Colombia) Gustavo Yacamán | 6 | 4 | 10 | **4** | 1 | 8 | 2 | 1* | 7 | 2 | 2 | 11 | 394 |
| 4 | (Colombia) Sebastián Saavedra | 3 | **1*** | **2** | 5 | 6 | 2 | 13 | 2 | 2 | 9 | 10 | **14** | 383 |
| 5 | (Colombia) Carlos Muñoz R | 14 | 14 | 5 | 2 | 2 | 5 | 7 | 10 | **1*** | 3 | 11 | 1* | 377 |
| 6 | (Brazil) Victor Carbone | 5 | 5 | 4 | 6* | 4 | 6 | 3 | **3** | 8 | 8 | DNS | 5 | 340 |
| 7 | (United Kingdom) Oliver Webb R | 4 | 13 | 6 | 15 | **3*** | 12 | 12 | 5 | 4 | 5 | 6 | 8 | 310 |
| 8 | (Canada) David Ostella | 15 | 9 | 8 | 18 | 13 | 4 | 5 | 7 | 10 | 6 | 4 | 2 | 298 |
| 9 | (Mexico) Juan Pablo Garcia | 7 | 8 | 7 | 11 | 9 | 11 | 14 | 8 | 9 | 10 | 9 | 10 | 260 |
| 10 | (Venezuela) Jorge Goncalvez | 11 | 10 | 9 | 12 | DNS | 9 | 6 | 9 | 11 | 7 | 7 | 13 | 247 |
| 11 | (Republic of Ireland) Peter Dempsey | | | | 14 | 11 | | | 4 | 5 | 11 | 5 | 12 | 164 |
| 12 | (Israel) Alon Day R | 12 | 6 | 11 | 8 | 8 | 7 | DNS | | | | | | 147 |
| 13 | (India) Armaan Ebrahim R | 8 | 12 | 12 | 13 | 10 | | | | | | | | 97 |
| 14 | (United States) Mike Larrison R | | | | 9 | | 13 | 11 | | | | | 9 | 80 |
| 15 | (Brazil) João Victor Horto R | 13 | 7 | | 7 | | | | | | | | | 69 |
| 16 | (United States) Darryl Wills R | 10 | 11 | 15 | | | | | | | | | | 54 |
| 17 | (United States) Chase Austin R | | | | 10 | | | 8 | | | | | | 44 |
| 18 | (United States) Bryan Clauson | | | | | | 10 | 10 | | | | | | 40 |
| 19 | (United States) Troy Castaneda R | 9 | 15 | | | | | | | | | | | 37 |
| 20 | (Norway) Anders Krohn | | | | 19 | | | 9 | | | | | | 34 |
| 21 | (United States) Rodin Younessi R | 16 | | | | 12 | | | | | | | | 32 |
| 22 | (United States) Emerson Newton-John R | | | | 17 | | | | | | | 12 | | 31 |
| 23 | (United Kingdom) Stefan Wilson | | | | | | | | | | | | 6 | 28 |
| 24 | (Venezuela) Bruno Palli R | | | | | | | | | | | | 7 | 26 |
| 25 | (Hong Kong) Adderly Fong R | | | | | | | | | | | 8 | | 24 |
| 26 | (United States) Nick Andries R | | | 13 | | | | | | | | | | 17 |
| 27 | (United Kingdom) Alex Jones R | | | 14 | | | | | | | | | | 16 |
| 28 | (United States) Brandon Wagner | | | | 16 | | | | | | | | | 14 |
| Pos | Driver | STP (United States) | BAR (United States) | LBH (United States) | INDY (United States) | DET (United States) | MIL (United States) | IOW (United States) | TOR (Canada) | EDM (Canada) | TRO (Canada) | BAL (United States) | FON (United States) | Pts |

| Color | Result |
|---|---|
| Gold | Winner |
| Silver | 2nd place |
| Bronze | 3rd place |
| Green | 4th & 5th place |
| Light Blue | 6th–10th place |
| Dark Blue | Finished (Outside Top 10) |
| Purple | Did not finish |
| Red | Did not qualify (DNQ) |
| Brown | Withdrawn (Wth) |
| Black | Disqualified (DSQ) |
| White | Did not start (DNS) |
| Blank | Did not participate (DNP) |
| Blank | Not competing |

**In-line notation**
| **Bold** | Pole position (1 point) |
| Italics | Ran fastest race lap |
| * | Led most race laps (2 points) |
| ^{1} | Qualifying cancelled no bonus point awarded |
Rookie of the Year
Rookie

| Position | 1 | 2 | 3 | 4 | 5 | 6 | 7 | 8 | 9 | 10 | 11 | 12 | 13 | 14 | 15 | 16 | 17 | 18 | 19 | 20 | 21 | 22 | 23 | 24 | 25 | 26 | 27 | 28 | 29 | 30 | 31 | 32 | 33 |
|---|---|---|---|---|---|---|---|---|---|---|---|---|---|---|---|---|---|---|---|---|---|---|---|---|---|---|---|---|---|---|---|---|---|
| Points | 50 | 40 | 35 | 32 | 30 | 28 | 26 | 24 | 22 | 20 | 19 | 18 | 17 | 16 | 15 | 14 | 13 | 12 | 12 | 12 | 12 | 12 | 12 | 12 | 10 | 10 | 10 | 10 | 10 | 10 | 10 | 10 | 10 |

- Ties in points broken by number of wins, or best finishes.
