= Mike Larrison =

American racing driver

Mike Larrison (born November 7, 1981) is an American racing driver from Avon, Indiana.

Larrison competed in the Xtreme Sprint Car Series in 2010 and 2011, finishing tenth and eleventh in points respectively. He also made two USAC Midget starts and four USAC Silver Crown starts over that time period. He signed with Andretti Autosport to make his Firestone Indy Lights debut in October 2011 at the Las Vegas Motor Speedway but was injured in a testing crash at Kentucky Speedway prior to the race and was not cleared to participate. He made his Indy Lights debut the following season with Belardi Auto Racing in the Freedom 100. Larrison drove in three more oval races later in the season for the team with a best finish of ninth (twice) and finished fourteenth in points.

== Racing record ==
=== American open–wheel racing results ===
(key)

==== Indy Lights ====
Year	Team	1	2	3	4	5	6	7	8	9	10	11	12	Rank	Points
2012	Belardi Auto Racing	STP	ALA	LBH	INDY; 9	DET	MIL; 13	IOW; 11	TOR	EDM	TRO	BAL	FON; 9	14th	80
