= Alex Jones (racing driver) =

Welsh racing driver (1988–2019)

Alexander Jones (27 September 1988 – 30 March 2019) was a British racing driver, cyclist and artist from Anglesey.

Jones began karting in 2004. He won the prestigious ABkC National Open Championship in TKM Extreme in 2006 and competing at Super 1 level in 2007 before competing in British Formula Ford and subsequently moving to the US to test and race in Indy Lights. Jones made his British Formula Ford Championship debut in 2007. He competed in a full season of British Formula Ford in 2008, finishing third in the scholarship class with six class wins and 17th in the overall championship. He returned to British Formula Ford in 2009 and finished thirteenth in the main championship with a pole position at Knockhill Racing Circuit. Jones did not participate in any races in 2010 or 2011 but did test Formula Three and Indy Lights cars.

Jones returned to professional racing in 2012 driving in Firestone Indy Lights for Brooks Associates Racing. He competed in Long Beach, crashing nineteen laps in, and was credited with 14th place.

On his return to the UK in 2012, Jones took up competitive cycling; racing on road, cycle cross and time trials. 2013 was his first full season of racing during which he progressed from 4th to 1st cat and also won the Great Orme Road Race, North Wales. During the winter of 2013 he raced in the North West Cyclocross League achieving fifth overall (including two wins).

Jones won the Avanti Gas 2 day road race in 2014; that year, he won the final stage and was the overall winner. Jones regularly competed in the Marsh Tracks, Rhyl Criterium races, and in his last race there at the end of 2016 lapped the field solo to win.

From 2016 to 2018, Jones turned his attention to Time Trials. He achieved several wins around the UK capped in 2018; he finished third place in the Welsh TT National Championship, and finished in sixteenth place at the British National 50 mile Championship.

On 30 March 2019, whilst cycling in the Denbighshire hills, Jones suffered a cardiac arrest and died at the age of 30.

== Racing record ==
=== American open–wheel racing results ===
(key)

==== Indy Lights ====
Year	Team	1	2	3	4	5	6	7	8	9	10	11	12	Rank	Points	Ref
2012	Brooks Associates Racing	STP	ALA	LBH; 14	INDY	DET	MIL	IOW	TOR	EDM	TRO	BAL	FON	27th	16	
