= Troy Castaneda =

American racing driver

- Nationality: (United States) American
- Born: November 15, 1989 (age 36)

Firestone Indy Lights
- Years active: 2012
- Former teams: Bryan Herta Autosport
- Starts: 2
- Wins: 0
- Poles: 0
- Fastest laps: 0

Previous series
- 2008 2007: Italian Formula Master; Formula Russell

Troy Castaneda (born November 15, 1989) is an American racing driver from Sacramento, California.

After karting from 2004 to 2006, Castaneda competed in the Formula Russell series in 2007 and the Italian Formula Master Championship in 2008. In 2009, he returned to karting, winning the US Rotax Nationals points championship and finishing second in the national championship event. He also competed in the Rotax World Finals where he finished fifth.

Castaneda made his professional racing debut with Bryan Herta Autosport on the Streets of St. Petersburg in the Firestone Indy Lights series in March 2012. He had previously tested in the fall of 2011 at the Indianapolis Motor Speedway with the team. Castaneda finished ninth in his debut at St. Pete but crashed out of the race due to a mechanical failure in his second start at Barber Motorsports Park. He was replaced in the BHA car by Nick Andries for the third race of the season in Long Beach.

Castaneda is also an International model and actor. He is currently represented by ICONS in South Africa, Wilhelmina Hawaii, STARS in San Francisco, Dreamodels in Hong Kong and MSA Models in Los Angeles. He is represented theatrically with Ayers Talent Agency and with Osbrink commercially.

== Racing record ==
=== American open–wheel racing results ===
(key)

==== Indy Lights ====
Year	Team	1	2	3	4	5	6	7	8	9	10	11	12	Rank	Points
2012	Bryan Herta Autosport	STP; 9	ALA; 15	LBH	INDY	DET	MIL	IOW	TOR	EDM	TRO	BAL	FON	19th	37
