= 2018 12 Hours of Sebring =

66th 12 Hours of Sebring race

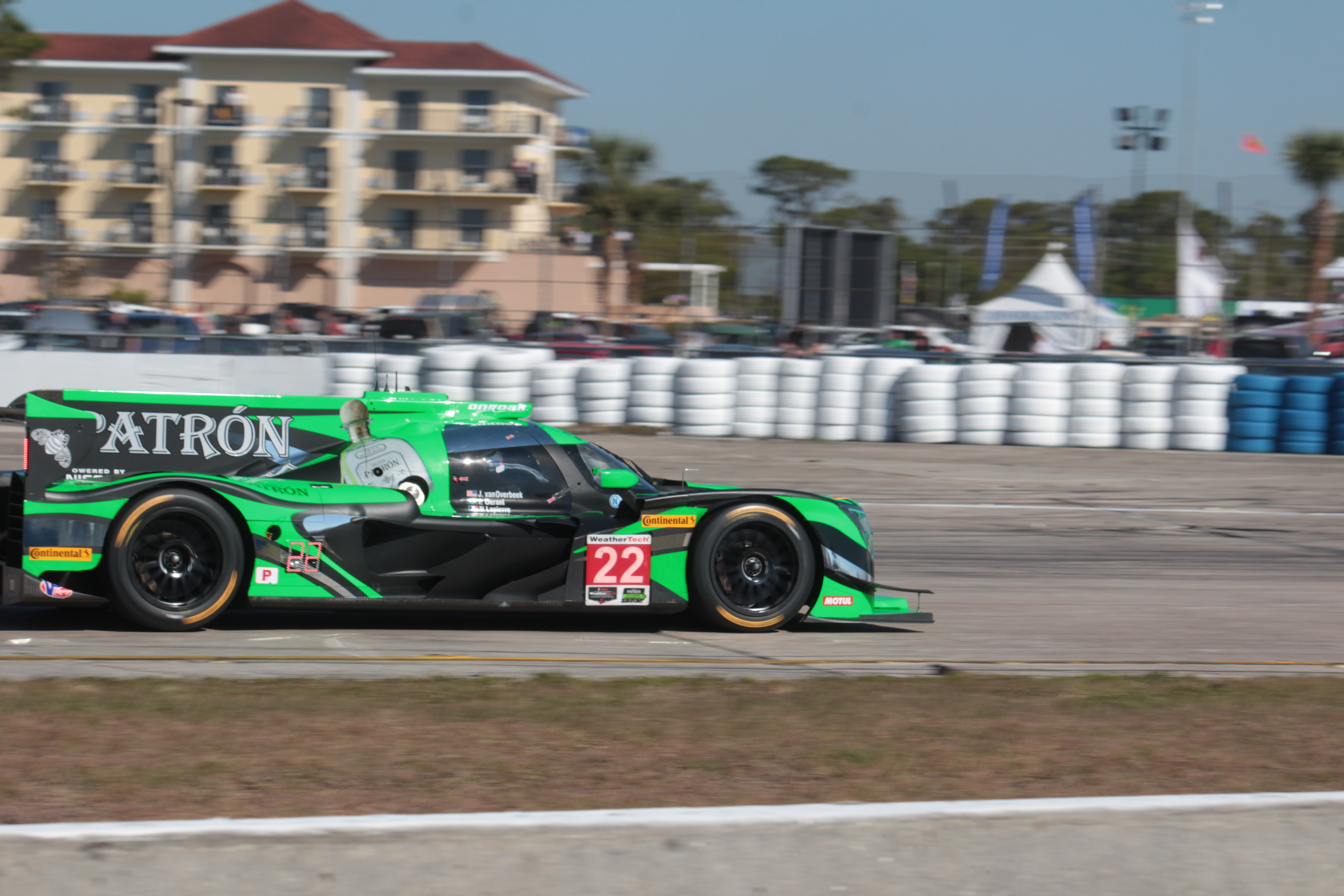
Nissan Onroak DPi #22 of Tequila Patrón ESM which won the 2018 12 Hours of Sebring

Sebring International Raceway

The 66th Mobil 1 12 Hours of Sebring Presented by Advance Auto Parts was an endurance sports car racing event held at Sebring International Raceway near Sebring, Florida from 15 to 17 March 2018. The race was the second round of the 2018 WeatherTech SportsCar Championship, as well as the second round of the North American Endurance Cup.

The race was won by Tequila Patrón ESM's Nissan Onroak DPi driven by Pipo Derani, Johannes van Overbeek, and Nicolas Lapierre, ahead of the Cadillac DPi-V.R's of Wayne Taylor Racing and Whelen Engineering Racing. Porsche took GTLM honours with Nick Tandy, Frédéric Makowiecki, and Patrick Pilet behind the wheel of their 911 RSR. The GTD category was won by Paul Miller Racing's Corey Lewis, Bryan Sellers and Madison Snow in a GT3-spec Lamborghini Huracán.

== Background ==
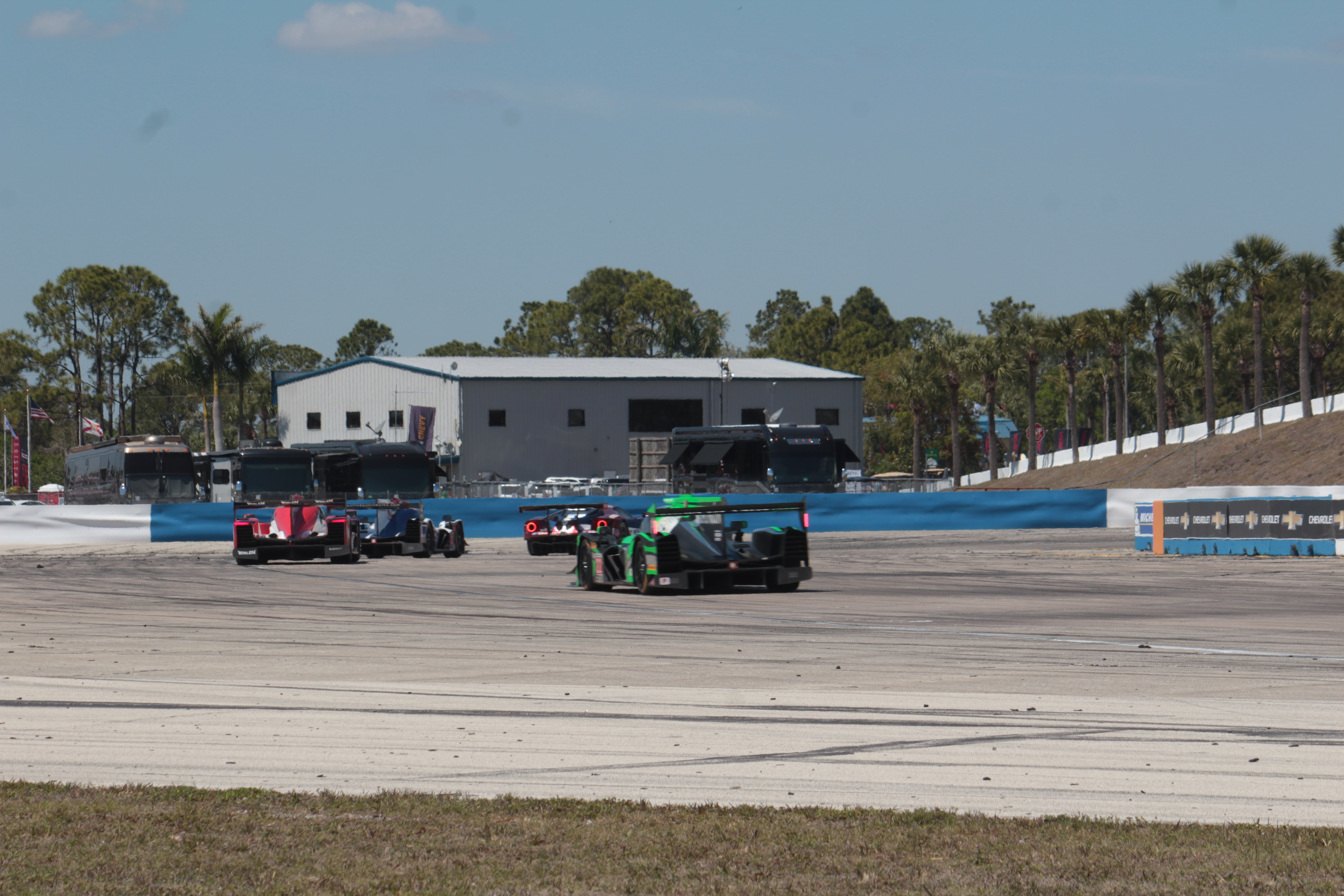
Sebring International Raceway, where the race was held.

International Motor Sports Association's (IMSA) president Scott Atherton confirmed the race was part of the schedule for the 2018 IMSA SportsCar Championship (IMSA SCC) in August 2017. It was the fifth consecutive year it was part of the IMSA SCC, and the 66th 12 Hours of Sebring. The 24 Hours of Daytona was the second of twelve scheduled sports car endurance races of 2018 by IMSA, and the second of four races of the North American Endurance Cup (NAEC). It was held at the 17-turn, 3.741-mile (6.021 km) Sebring International Raceway in Sebring, Florida on March 17, 2018.

On March 1, 2018, IMSA released a bulletin outlining the minimum refueling times for all the classes. All cars in the Prototype class were given 30 second minimum refueling time while GTLM and GTD were given times of 34 and 40 seconds, respectively. The times were made to override any refueling restrictor size following Montaplast by Land-Motorsport's penalty at Daytona.

After the 24 Hours of Daytona 7 weeks earlier, Filipe Albuquerque, João Barbosa, and Christian Fittipaldi were leading the Prototype Drivers' Championship with 35 points. GTLM was led by Ryan Briscoe, Richard Westbrook, and Scott Dixon with a three-point advantage over Joey Hand, Dirk Müller, and Sébastien Bourdais. In GTD, the Drivers' Championship was led by Mirko Bortolotti, Rik Breukers, Rolf Ineichen, and Franck Perera with 35 points. Cadillac, Ford, and Lamborghini were leading their respective Manufacturers' Championships, while Mustang Sampling Racing, Ford Chip Ganassi Racing, and GRT Grasser Racing Team each led their own Teams' Championships.

On March 7, 2018, IMSA released the latest technical bulletin outlining Balance of Performance for the event. In the Prototype class, the Acura ARX-05 received a reduction of turbo boost and a fuel capacity reduction of 1 liter while the Nissan Onroak DPi got a turbo boost reduction between 6000-7600 rpm. The Cadillac DPi-V.R received a 10 kilogram weight increase while the Mazda RT24-P received a fuel capacity increase of 2 liters and adjustments to the cars rear wing. In the GTLM class, the BMW M8 GTE received a 20 kilogram weight reduction and increase of power between 5000-7500 rpm while the Porsche 911 RSR got a fuel capacity increase of 2 liters. In the GTD class, the Mercedes-AMG GT3 received a 20 kilogram weight increase and a 1mm air restrictor increase while the Lexus RC F GT3 received a 1mm air restrictor increase.

=== Entries ===
A total of 43 cars took part in the event split across 3 classes. 16 cars were entered in P, 9 in GTLM, and 18 in GTD. In P, BAR1 Motorsports and Jackie Chan DCR JOTA were absent while United Autosports scaled down to 1 entry. Paul Di Resta joined Phil Hanson and Alex Brundle in the United Autosports #32 entry while Bruno Senna missed the event after having undergone a surgical procedure a few weeks earlier. In GTD, Grasser Racing Team and Manthey Racing skipped the event while Risi Competizione scaled down focussing on its GTLM effort. CJ Wilson Racing made their IMSA SportsCar Championship debut at this event. Dillon Machavern and Markus Palttala joined Don Yount in the Turner Motorsport entry. Following the retirement of Scott Pruett, Sean Rayhall joined 3GT Racing in the teams #15 entry. Corey Lewis joined Bryan Sellers and Madison Snow in the Paul Miller Racing entry. Tom Dyer joined Ryan Eversley and Chad Gilsinger in the HART entry.

== Practice ==
There were four practice sessions preceding the start of the race on Saturday, three on Thursday and one on Friday. The first two one-hour sessions were on Thursday morning and afternoon. The third held later that evening ran for 90 minutes; the fourth on Friday morning lasted an hour.

=== Practice 1 ===
The first practice session took place at 11:00 am ET on Thursday and ended with Hélio Castroneves topping the charts for Acura Team Penske, with a lap time of 1:48.237.

Pos.	Class	No.	Team	Driver	Time	Gap
1	P	7	Acura Team Penske	Hélio Castroneves	1:48.237	_
2	P	90	Spirit of Daytona Racing	Tristan Vautier	1:48.387	+0.150
3	P	10	Wayne Taylor Racing	Renger van der Zande	1:48.415	+0.178

=== Practice 2 ===
The second practice session took place at 3:10 pm ET on Thursday and ended with Ricky Taylor topping the charts for Acura Team Pensken, with a lap time of 1:47.841.

Pos.	Class	No.	Team	Driver	Time	Gap
1	P	7	Acura Team Penske	Ricky Taylor	1:47.841	_
2	P	55	Mazda Team Joest	Jonathan Bomarito	1:48.753	+0.912
3	P	5	Mustang Sampling Racing	Filipe Albuquerque	1:48.805	+0.964

=== Night Practice ===
The night practice session took place at 7:30 pm ET on Thursday and ended with René Rast topping the charts for Mazda Team Joest, with a lap time of 1:48.233.

Pos.	Class	No.	Team	Driver	Time	Gap
1	P	77	Mazda Team Joest	René Rast	1:48.233	_
2	P	55	Mazda Team Joest	Harry Tincknell	1:48.690	+0.457
3	P	31	Whelen Engineering Racing	Felipe Nasr	1:48.799	+0.566

=== Final Practice ===
The fourth and final practice session took place at 8:00 am ET on Friday and ended with Ricky Taylor topping the charts for Acura Team Penske, with a lap time of 1:47.076.

Pos.	Class	No.	Team	Driver	Time	Gap
1	P	7	Acura Team Penske	Ricky Taylor	1:47.076	_
2	P	22	Tequila Patrón ESM	Pipo Derani	1:47.512	+0.436
3	P	38	Performance Tech Motorsports	Patricio O'Ward	1:47.861	+0.785

== Qualifying ==
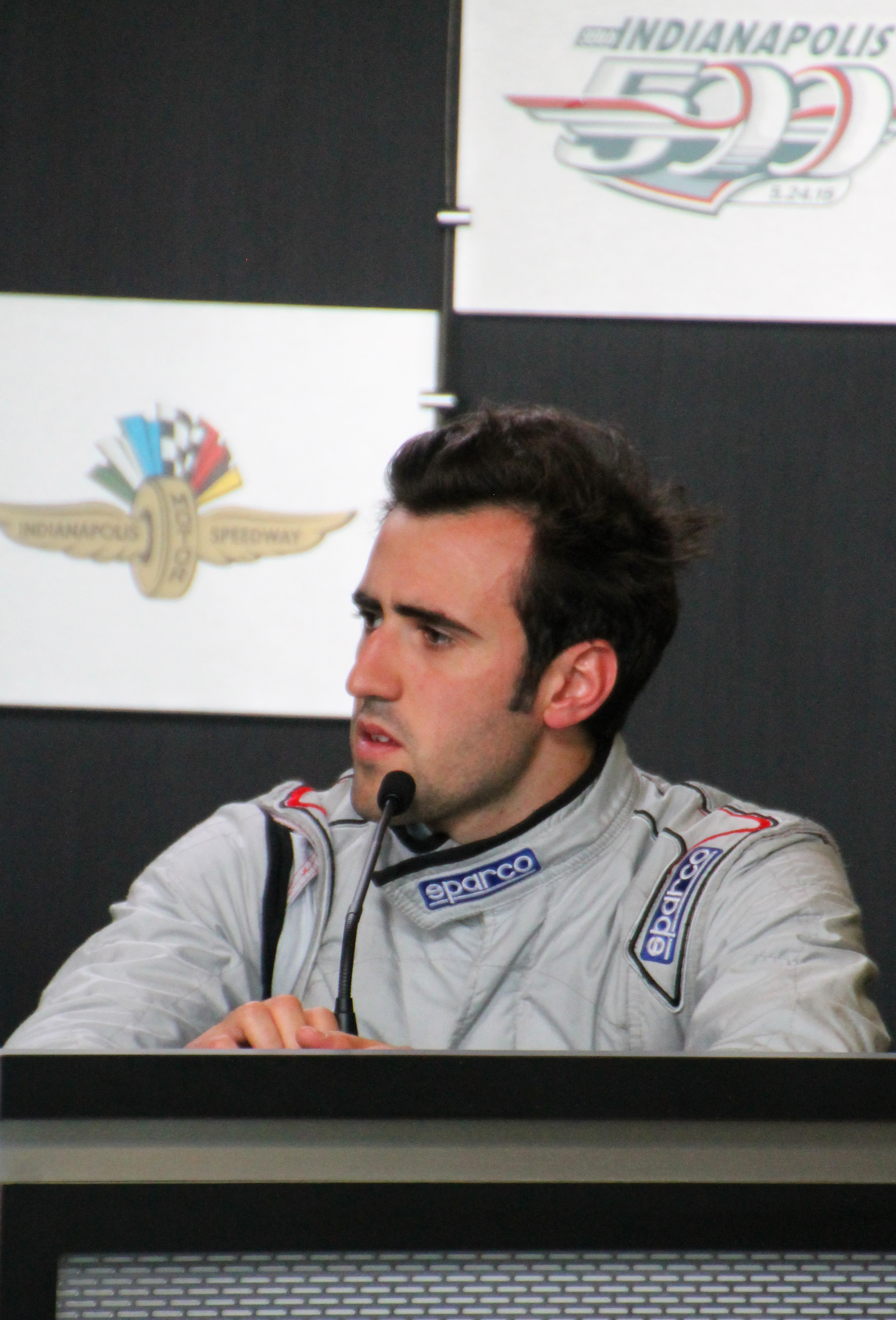
Tristan Vautier (pictured in 2015) took the overall pole position for Spirit of Daytona Racing.

Friday afternoon's 65-minute qualifying session was divided into three groups. All three categories had 15-minute individual sessions, and regulations stipulated teams to nominate a single driver to qualify their cars. The competitors' fastest lap times determined the starting order with the grid arranged to put the Prototype and GTLM cars ahead of all GTD entries.

The first was for cars in GTD class. Daniel Serra qualified on pole for the class driving the #51 car for Spirit of Race, beating Christopher Mies in the #29 Montaplast by Land-Motorsport car by over five tenths of a second.

The second session of qualifying was for cars in the GTLM class. Connor De Phillippi qualified on pole driving the #25 car for BMW Team RLL, beating James Calado in the #62 Risi Competizione car by less than one tenth of a second.

The final session of qualifying was for the P class. Tristan Vautier qualified on pole driving the #90 car for Spirit of Daytona Racing, besting Olivier Pla in the #2 Tequila Patrón ESM entry.

=== Qualifying results ===
Pole positions in each class are indicated in bold and by ‡.

Pos.	Class	No.	Team	Driver	Time	Gap	Grid
1	**P**	**90**	**(United States) Spirit of Daytona Racing**	**(France) Tristan Vautier**	**1:47.432**	**_**	1‡
2	P	2	(United States) Tequila Patrón ESM	(France) Olivier Pla	1:47.592	+0.160	2
3	P	7	(United States) Acura Team Penske	(United States) Ricky Taylor	1:47.773	+0.341	3
4	P	22	(United States) Tequila Patrón ESM	(Brazil) Pipo Derani	1:47.834	+0.402	4
5	P	31	(United States) Whelen Engineering Racing	(Brazil) Felipe Nasr	1:47.853	+0.421	5
6	P	6	(United States) Acura Team Penske	(Colombia) Juan Pablo Montoya	1:48.177	+0.745	6
7	P	77	(Germany) Mazda Team Joest	(Germany) René Rast	1:48.192	+0.760	15^{1}
8	P	5	(United States) Mustang Sampling Racing	(Portugal) Filipe Albuquerque	1:48.256	+0.824	7
9	P	55	(Germany) Mazda Team Joest	(United States) Jonathan Bomarito	1:48.279	+0.847	16^{2}
10	P	10	(United States) Wayne Taylor Racing	(Netherlands) Renger van der Zande	1:48.370	+0.938	8
11	P	99	(United States) JDC-Miller MotorSports	(South Africa) Stephen Simpson	1:48.742	+1.310	9
12	P	38	(United States) Performance Tech Motorsports	(Mexico) Patricio O'Ward	1:49.068	+1.636	10
13	P	54	(United States) CORE Autosport	(United States) Colin Braun	1:49.158	+1.726	11
14	P	85	(United States) JDC-Miller MotorSports	(Switzerland) Simon Trummer	1:49.329	+1.897	12
15	P	52	(United States) AFS/PR1 Mathiasen Motorsports	(Colombia) Sebastián Saavedra	1:49.423	+1.991	13
16	P	32	(United States) United Autosports	(United Kingdom) Paul di Resta	1:49.488	+2.056	14^{3}
17	**GTLM**	**25**	**(United States) BMW Team RLL**	**(United States) Connor De Phillippi**	**1:55.839**	**+8.407**	17‡
18	GTLM	62	(United States) Risi Competizione	(United Kingdom) James Calado	1:55.897	+8.465	18
19	GTLM	24	(United States) BMW Team RLL	(Finland) Jesse Krohn	1:55.985	+8.553	19
20	GTLM	67	(United States) Ford Chip Ganassi Racing	(United Kingdom) Richard Westbrook	1:56.098	+8.666	20
21	GTLM	66	(United States) Ford Chip Ganassi Racing	(United States) Joey Hand	1:56.191	+8.759	21
22	GTLM	912	(United States) Porsche GT Team	(Belgium) Laurens Vanthoor	1:56.251	+8.819	22
23	GTLM	3	(United States) Corvette Racing	(Spain) Antonio García	1:56.588	+9.156	23
24	GTLM	911	(United States) Porsche GT Team	(United Kingdom) Nick Tandy	1:56.626	+9.194	24
25	GTLM	4	(United States) Corvette Racing	(United States) Tommy Milner	1:56.900	+9.468	25
26	**GTD**	**51**	**(Switzerland) Spirit of Race**	**(Brazil) Daniel Serra**	**1:58.710**	**+11.278**	26‡
27	GTD	29	(Germany) Montaplast by Land-Motorsport	(Germany) Christopher Mies	1:59.229	+11.797	27
28	GTD	15	(United States) 3GT Racing	(United Kingdom) Jack Hawksworth	1:59.251	+11.819	28
29	GTD	14	(United States) 3GT Racing	(Austria) Dominik Baumann	1:59.476	+12.044	29
30	GTD	48	(United States) Paul Miller Racing	(United States) Madison Snow	1:59.489	+12.057	30
31	GTD	63	(United States) Scuderia Corsa	(United States) Gunnar Jeannette	1:59.609	+12.177	31
32	GTD	75	(United States) SunEnergy1 Racing	(Germany) Thomas Jäger	1:59.952	+12.520	32
33	GTD	69	(United States) HART	(United States) Tom Dyer	2:00.069	+12.637	33
34	GTD	64	(United States) Scuderia Corsa	(United States) Frankie Montecalvo	2:00.080	+12.648	34
35	GTD	86	(United States) Michael Shank Racing with Curb Agajanian	(United Kingdom) Katherine Legge	2:00.198	+12.766	35
36	GTD	58	(United States) Wright Motorsports	(Denmark) Christina Nielsen	2:00.378	+12.946	36
37	GTD	36	(United States) CJ Wilson Racing	(United States) Marc Miller	2:00.686	+13.254	37
38	GTD	71	(United States) P1 Motorsports	(United States) Kenton Koch	2:00.717	+13.285	38
39	GTD	33	(United States) Mercedes-AMG Team Riley Motorsport	(United States) Ben Keating	2:00.743	+13.311	39
40	GTD	44	(United States) Magnus Racing	(United States) John Potter	2:02.151	+14.719	40
41	GTD	96	(United States) Turner Motorsport	(United States) Dillon Machavern	2:03.227	+15.795	41
42	GTD	73	(United States) Park Place Motorsports	(United States) Tim Pappas	2:04.650	+17.218	42
43	GTD	93	(United States) Michael Shank Racing with Curb Agajanian	did not participate			43^{4}
Sources:

- ^{1} The No. 77 Mazda Team Joest entry was moved to the back of the P field after failing post qualifying technical inspection.
- ^{2} The No. 55 Mazda Team Joest entry was moved to the back of the P field failing post qualifying technical inspection.
- ^{3} The No. 32 United Autosports entry initially qualified sixteenth for the P class. However, the team changed engines after qualifying. By IMSA rules, the entry was moved to the rear of the P field on the starting grid.
- ^{4} The No. 93 Michael Shank Racing with Curb Agajanian entry was moved to the back of the GTD field for starting the race with a different driver than who qualified.

== Race ==
=== Start and early hours ===
At the start of the race at turn 1, Vautier and Pla had a collision that led to Pla needing to pit during the next lap of the race. In addition to this, both Milner and Serra both got tire punctures and also needed to pit. Around twenty minutes into the race, Saavedra spun around the final corner and was hit by Montecalvo who was flipped over following a hit to the tirewall. Just before the four hour mark, an awning blew onto the track bringing out the yellow flag. Almost immediately after the caution ended however, Brundle spun during the final turn.

=== Afternoon ===
At the beginning of the afternoon, a Lexus hit a wall which caused debris to spread onto the track. This led to a caution period which caused Derani to lose his seventeen second lead. Just after the restart, an Acura retired due to an oil pressure problem. Towards the six hour mark, Fittipaldi and Nasr were involved in a collision that sprung from Nasr diving towards Fittipaldi. The collision led to Fittipaldi being spun around but rejoining the track shortly after. Around the halfway mark, Vautier was given a drive through penalty after hitting Montoya which led to his retirement. Later, there was another collision between van der Zande and Curran which lead to tire debris being torn off and causing another yellow flag. Before the end of the afternoon, Barbosa and French had a collision that led to the two falling multiple laps behind the leader.

=== Sunset to finish ===
At the beginning of the afternoon, Bruni hit a curb which led to his diffuser landing on the track. This brought out another yellow flag however after the flag the Porsche managed to maintain third place. Just before the end of the race, while in second, Pigot had attempted to drive between Vautier and the wall which led to him hitting debris and lose multiple places. The Mazda of Tincknell also would not engage it's clutch for a full two minutes which led to it losing a full lap to the leader. At the end of the race, the number 22 Nissan took first in the prototype class, the number 911 Porsche took first in the GTLM class, and number 48 Lamborghini took first in the GTD class.

== Post-race ==
In Prototype, Curran, Nasr, and Conway moved to first after being second coming into Sebring. Albuquerque, Barbosa, and Fittipaldi dropped from first to third. The result kept Briscoe, Westbrook, and Dixon atop the GTLM Drivers' Championship with 63 points. Pilet, Tandy, and Makowiecki advanced from eighth to second while Hand, Müller, and Bourdais dropped from second to fourth. De Phillippi, Sims, and Auberlen moved to fifth after being ninth coming into Sebring. As a result of winning the race, Sellers and Snow took the lead of the GTD Drivers' Championship. Bleekemolen, Keating, and Stolz advanced from fourth to second while Legge, Parente, and Hindman dropped from second to third. MacNeil, Jeannette, and Balzan advanced from tenth to fourth. Cadillac, Ford, and Lamborghini continued to top their respective Manufacturers' Championships while Ford Chip Ganassi Racing kept their respective advantage in the GTLM Teams' Championship. Whelen Engineering Racing and Paul Miller Racing took the lead in their respective Teams' Championships with ten rounds left in the season.

=== Race results ===
Class winners are denoted in bold.

Final race classification
Pos	Class	No.	Team	Drivers	Chassis	Tire	Laps	Time/Retired
Pos	Class	No.	Team	Drivers	Engine	Tire	Laps	Time/Retired
1	**P**	**22**	**(United States) Tequila Patrón ESM**	**(Brazil) Pipo Derani (United States) Johannes van Overbeek (France) Nicolas Lapierre**	**Nissan Onroak DPi**	C	**344**	**12:00:34.369**
1	**P**	**22**	**(United States) Tequila Patrón ESM**	**(Brazil) Pipo Derani (United States) Johannes van Overbeek (France) Nicolas Lapierre**	**Nissan VR38DETT 3.8 L Turbo V6**	C	**344**	**12:00:34.369**
2	P	10	(United States) Wayne Taylor Racing	(United States) Jordan Taylor (Netherlands) Renger van der Zande (United States) Ryan Hunter-Reay	Cadillac DPi-V.R	C	344	+12.427
2	P	10	(United States) Wayne Taylor Racing	(United States) Jordan Taylor (Netherlands) Renger van der Zande (United States) Ryan Hunter-Reay	Cadillac 5.5 L V8	C	344	+12.427
3	P	31	(United States) Whelen Engineering Racing	(Brazil) Felipe Nasr (United States) Eric Curran (United Kingdom) Mike Conway	Cadillac DPi-V.R	C	344	+53.075
3	P	31	(United States) Whelen Engineering Racing	(Brazil) Felipe Nasr (United States) Eric Curran (United Kingdom) Mike Conway	Cadillac 5.5 L V8	C	344	+53.075
4	P	54	(United States) CORE Autosport	(United States) Jon Bennett (United States) Colin Braun (France) Romain Dumas	Oreca 07	C	344	+1:16.328
4	P	54	(United States) CORE Autosport	(United States) Jon Bennett (United States) Colin Braun (France) Romain Dumas	Gibson GK428 4.2 L V8	C	344	+1:16.328
5	P	32	(United States) United Autosports	(United Kingdom) Paul di Resta (United Kingdom) Alex Brundle (United Kingdom) Phil Hanson	Ligier JS P217	C	344	+1:30.732
5	P	32	(United States) United Autosports	(United Kingdom) Paul di Resta (United Kingdom) Alex Brundle (United Kingdom) Phil Hanson	Gibson GK428 4.2 L V8	C	344	+1:30.732
6	P	55	(Germany) Mazda Team Joest	(United States) Jonathan Bomarito (United Kingdom) Harry Tincknell (United States) Spencer Pigot	Mazda RT24-P	C	343	+1 Laps
6	P	55	(Germany) Mazda Team Joest	(United States) Jonathan Bomarito (United Kingdom) Harry Tincknell (United States) Spencer Pigot	Mazda MZ-2.0T 2.0L Turbo I4	C	343	+1 Laps
7	P	99	(United States) JDC-Miller MotorSports	(Canada) Mikhail Goikhberg (South Africa) Stephen Simpson (United States) Chris Miller	Oreca 07	C	338	+6 Laps
7	P	99	(United States) JDC-Miller MotorSports	(Canada) Mikhail Goikhberg (South Africa) Stephen Simpson (United States) Chris Miller	Gibson GK428 4.2 L V8	C	338	+6 Laps
8	P	77	(Germany) Mazda Team Joest	(United Kingdom) Oliver Jarvis (United States) Tristan Nunez (Germany) René Rast	Mazda RT24-P	C	334	+10 Laps
8	P	77	(Germany) Mazda Team Joest	(United Kingdom) Oliver Jarvis (United States) Tristan Nunez (Germany) René Rast	Mazda MZ-2.0T 2.0L Turbo I4	C	334	+10 Laps
9	P	85	(United States) JDC-Miller MotorSports	(United States) Robert Alon (Switzerland) Simon Trummer (France) Nelson Panciatici	Oreca 07	C	331	+13 Laps
9	P	85	(United States) JDC-Miller MotorSports	(United States) Robert Alon (Switzerland) Simon Trummer (France) Nelson Panciatici	Gibson GK428 4.2 L V8	C	331	+13 Laps
10	**GTLM**	**911**	**(United States) Porsche GT Team**	**(France) Patrick Pilet (United Kingdom) Nick Tandy (France) Frédéric Makowiecki**	**Porsche 911 RSR**	MI	**328**	**+16 Laps**
10	**GTLM**	**911**	**(United States) Porsche GT Team**	**(France) Patrick Pilet (United Kingdom) Nick Tandy (France) Frédéric Makowiecki**	**Porsche 4.0 L Flat-6**	MI	**328**	**+16 Laps**
11	GTLM	25	(United States) BMW Team RLL	(United States) Connor De Phillippi (United States) Bill Auberlen (United Kingdom) Alexander Sims	BMW M8 GTE	MI	328	+16 Laps
11	GTLM	25	(United States) BMW Team RLL	(United States) Connor De Phillippi (United States) Bill Auberlen (United Kingdom) Alexander Sims	BMW S63 4.0 L Turbo V8	MI	328	+16 Laps
12	GTLM	912	(United States) Porsche GT Team	(New Zealand) Earl Bamber (Belgium) Laurens Vanthoor (Italy) Gianmaria Bruni	Porsche 911 RSR	MI	328	+16 Laps
12	GTLM	912	(United States) Porsche GT Team	(New Zealand) Earl Bamber (Belgium) Laurens Vanthoor (Italy) Gianmaria Bruni	Porsche 4.0 L Flat-6	MI	328	+16 Laps
13	GTLM	67	(United States) Ford Chip Ganassi Racing	(Australia) Ryan Briscoe (United Kingdom) Richard Westbrook (New Zealand) Scott Dixon	Ford GT	MI	328	+16 Laps
13	GTLM	67	(United States) Ford Chip Ganassi Racing	(Australia) Ryan Briscoe (United Kingdom) Richard Westbrook (New Zealand) Scott Dixon	Ford EcoBoost 3.5 L Turbo V6	MI	328	+16 Laps
14	GTLM	62	(United States) Risi Competizione	(United Kingdom) James Calado (Italy) Alessandro Pier Guidi (Finland) Toni Vilander	Ferrari 488 GTE	MI	328	+16 Laps
14	GTLM	62	(United States) Risi Competizione	(United Kingdom) James Calado (Italy) Alessandro Pier Guidi (Finland) Toni Vilander	Ferrari F154CB 3.9 L Turbo V8	MI	328	+16 Laps
15	GTLM	4	(United States) Corvette Racing	(United Kingdom) Oliver Gavin (United States) Tommy Milner (Switzerland) Marcel Fässler	Chevrolet Corvette C7.R	MI	327	+17 Laps
15	GTLM	4	(United States) Corvette Racing	(United Kingdom) Oliver Gavin (United States) Tommy Milner (Switzerland) Marcel Fässler	Chevrolet LT5.5 5.5 L V8	MI	327	+17 Laps
16	P	5	(United States) Mustang Sampling Racing	(Portugal) Filipe Albuquerque (Portugal) João Barbosa (Brazil) Christian Fittipaldi	Cadillac DPi-V.R	C	324	+20 Laps
16	P	5	(United States) Mustang Sampling Racing	(Portugal) Filipe Albuquerque (Portugal) João Barbosa (Brazil) Christian Fittipaldi	Cadillac 5.5 L V8	C	324	+20 Laps
17	**GTD**	**48**	**(United States) Paul Miller Racing**	**(United States) Bryan Sellers (United States) Madison Snow (United States) Corey Lewis**	**Lamborghini Huracán GT3**	C	**321**	**+23 Laps**
17	**GTD**	**48**	**(United States) Paul Miller Racing**	**(United States) Bryan Sellers (United States) Madison Snow (United States) Corey Lewis**	**Lamborghini 5.2 L V10**	C	**321**	**+23 Laps**
18	GTD	63	(United States) Scuderia Corsa	(Italy) Alessandro Balzan (United States) Cooper MacNeil (United States) Gunnar Jeannette	Ferrari 488 GT3	C	321	+23 Laps
18	GTD	63	(United States) Scuderia Corsa	(Italy) Alessandro Balzan (United States) Cooper MacNeil (United States) Gunnar Jeannette	Ferrari F154CB 3.9 L Turbo V8	C	321	+23 Laps
19	GTD	33	(United States) Mercedes-AMG Team Riley Motorsport	(Netherlands) Jeroen Bleekemolen (United States) Ben Keating (Germany) Luca Stolz	Mercedes-AMG GT3	C	321	+23 Laps
19	GTD	33	(United States) Mercedes-AMG Team Riley Motorsport	(Netherlands) Jeroen Bleekemolen (United States) Ben Keating (Germany) Luca Stolz	Mercedes-AMG M159 6.2 L V8	C	321	+23 Laps
20	GTD	29	(Germany) Montaplast by Land-Motorsport	(South Africa) Sheldon van der Linde (Germany) Christopher Mies (Belgium) Alessio Picariello	Audi R8 LMS GT3	C	321	+23 Laps
20	GTD	29	(Germany) Montaplast by Land-Motorsport	(South Africa) Sheldon van der Linde (Germany) Christopher Mies (Belgium) Alessio Picariello	Audi 5.2L V10	C	321	+23 Laps
21	GTD	15	(United States) 3GT Racing	(United Kingdom) Jack Hawksworth (Denmark) David Heinemeier Hansson (United States) Sean Rayhall	Lexus RC F GT3	C	321	+23 Laps
21	GTD	15	(United States) 3GT Racing	(United Kingdom) Jack Hawksworth (Denmark) David Heinemeier Hansson (United States) Sean Rayhall	Lexus 5.0L V8	C	321	+23 Laps
22	GTD	58	(United States) Wright Motorsports	(United States) Patrick Long (Denmark) Christina Nielsen (France) Mathieu Jaminet (Germany) Robert Renauer	Porsche 911 GT3 R	C	321	+23 Laps
22	GTD	58	(United States) Wright Motorsports	(United States) Patrick Long (Denmark) Christina Nielsen (France) Mathieu Jaminet (Germany) Robert Renauer	Porsche 4.0 L Flat-6	C	321	+23 Laps
23	GTD	93	(United States) Michael Shank Racing with Curb Agajanian	(Germany) Mario Farnbacher (United States) Justin Marks (United States) Lawson Aschenbach	Acura NSX GT3	C	321	+23 Laps
23	GTD	93	(United States) Michael Shank Racing with Curb Agajanian	(Germany) Mario Farnbacher (United States) Justin Marks (United States) Lawson Aschenbach	Acura 3.5 L Turbo V6	C	321	+23 Laps
24	GTD	86	(United States) Michael Shank Racing with Curb Agajanian	(United Kingdom) Katherine Legge (Portugal) Álvaro Parente (United States) Trent Hindman	Acura NSX GT3	C	321	+23 Laps
24	GTD	86	(United States) Michael Shank Racing with Curb Agajanian	(United Kingdom) Katherine Legge (Portugal) Álvaro Parente (United States) Trent Hindman	Acura 3.5 L Turbo V6	C	321	+23 Laps
25	GTD	73	(United States) Park Place Motorsports	(Germany) Jörg Bergmeister (United States) Patrick Lindsey (United States) Tim Pappas	Porsche 911 GT3 R	C	321	+23 Laps
25	GTD	73	(United States) Park Place Motorsports	(Germany) Jörg Bergmeister (United States) Patrick Lindsey (United States) Tim Pappas	Porsche 4.0 L Flat-6	C	321	+23 Laps
26	GTD	75	(United States) SunEnergy1 Racing	(Australia) Kenny Habul (Germany) Thomas Jäger (Canada) Mikaël Grenier	Mercedes-AMG GT3	C	321	+23 Laps
26	GTD	75	(United States) SunEnergy1 Racing	(Australia) Kenny Habul (Germany) Thomas Jäger (Canada) Mikaël Grenier	Mercedes-AMG M159 6.2 L V8	C	321	+23 Laps
27	GTD	96	(United States) Turner Motorsport	(United States) Don Yount (United States) Dillon Machavern (Finland) Markus Palttala	BMW M6 GT3	C	320	+24 Laps
27	GTD	96	(United States) Turner Motorsport	(United States) Don Yount (United States) Dillon Machavern (Finland) Markus Palttala	BMW 4.4 L Turbo V8	C	320	+24 Laps
28	GTD	51	(Switzerland) Spirit of Race	(Canada) Paul Dalla Lana (Portugal) Pedro Lamy (Austria) Mathias Lauda (Brazil) Daniel Serra	Ferrari 488 GT3	C	320	+24 Laps
28	GTD	51	(Switzerland) Spirit of Race	(Canada) Paul Dalla Lana (Portugal) Pedro Lamy (Austria) Mathias Lauda (Brazil) Daniel Serra	Ferrari F154CB 3.9 L Turbo V8	C	320	+24 Laps
29	GTD	44	(United States) Magnus Racing	(United States) John Potter (United States) Andy Lally (United States) Andrew Davis	Audi R8 LMS GT3	C	319	+25 Laps
29	GTD	44	(United States) Magnus Racing	(United States) John Potter (United States) Andy Lally (United States) Andrew Davis	Audi 5.2L V10	C	319	+25 Laps
30	GTD	14	(United States) 3GT Racing	(Austria) Dominik Baumann (Canada) Kyle Marcelli (Switzerland) Phillipp Frommenwiler	Lexus RC F GT3	C	316	+28 Laps
30	GTD	14	(United States) 3GT Racing	(Austria) Dominik Baumann (Canada) Kyle Marcelli (Switzerland) Phillipp Frommenwiler	Lexus 5.0L V8	C	316	+28 Laps
31	P	52	(United States) AFS/PR1 Mathiasen Motorsports	(Colombia) Sebastián Saavedra (Colombia) Gustavo Yacamán (Mexico) Roberto González	Ligier JS P217	C	315	+29 Laps
31	P	52	(United States) AFS/PR1 Mathiasen Motorsports	(Colombia) Sebastián Saavedra (Colombia) Gustavo Yacamán (Mexico) Roberto González	Gibson GK428 4.2 L V8	C	315	+29 Laps
32	GTD	69	(United States) HART	(United States) Ryan Eversley (United States) Chad Gilsinger (United States) Tom Dyer	Acura NSX GT3	C	312	+32 Laps
32	GTD	69	(United States) HART	(United States) Ryan Eversley (United States) Chad Gilsinger (United States) Tom Dyer	Acura 3.5 L Turbo V6	C	312	+32 Laps
33	GTD	36	(United States) CJ Wilson Racing	(United States) Marc Miller (United Kingdom) Till Bechtolsheimer (Canada) Kuno Wittmer	Acura NSX GT3	C	309	+35 laps
33	GTD	36	(United States) CJ Wilson Racing	(United States) Marc Miller (United Kingdom) Till Bechtolsheimer (Canada) Kuno Wittmer	Acura 3.5 L Turbo V6	C	309	+35 laps
34 DNF	GTLM	24	(United States) BMW Team RLL	(United States) John Edwards (Finland) Jesse Krohn (Netherlands) Nick Catsburg	BMW M8 GTE	MI	296	Did Not Finish
34 DNF	GTLM	24	(United States) BMW Team RLL	(United States) John Edwards (Finland) Jesse Krohn (Netherlands) Nick Catsburg	BMW S63 4.0 L Turbo V8	MI	296	Did Not Finish
35 DNF	P	90	(United States) Spirit of Daytona Racing	(Italy) Eddie Cheever III (United States) Matt McMurry (France) Tristan Vautier	Cadillac DPi-V.R	C	294	Crash
35 DNF	P	90	(United States) Spirit of Daytona Racing	(Italy) Eddie Cheever III (United States) Matt McMurry (France) Tristan Vautier	Cadillac 5.5 L V8	C	294	Crash
36	GTLM	3	(United States) Corvette Racing	(Spain) Antonio García (Denmark) Jan Magnussen (Germany) Mike Rockenfeller	Chevrolet Corvette C7.R	MI	283	+61 laps
36	GTLM	3	(United States) Corvette Racing	(Spain) Antonio García (Denmark) Jan Magnussen (Germany) Mike Rockenfeller	Chevrolet LT5.5 5.5 L V8	MI	283	+61 laps
37 DNF	GTLM	66	(United States) Ford Chip Ganassi Racing	(United States) Joey Hand (Germany) Dirk Müller (France) Sébastien Bourdais	Ford GT	MI	277	Did Not Finish
37 DNF	GTLM	66	(United States) Ford Chip Ganassi Racing	(United States) Joey Hand (Germany) Dirk Müller (France) Sébastien Bourdais	Ford EcoBoost 3.5 L Turbo V6	MI	277	Did Not Finish
38 DNF	P	38	(United States) Performance Tech Motorsports	(United States) James French (United States) Kyle Masson (Mexico) Patricio O'Ward	Oreca 07	C	276	Did Not Finish
38 DNF	P	38	(United States) Performance Tech Motorsports	(United States) James French (United States) Kyle Masson (Mexico) Patricio O'Ward	Gibson GK428 4.2 L V8	C	276	Did Not Finish
39 DNF	P	6	(United States) Acura Team Penske	(United States) Dane Cameron (Colombia) Juan Pablo Montoya (France) Simon Pagenaud	Acura ARX-05	C	203	Lost Power
39 DNF	P	6	(United States) Acura Team Penske	(United States) Dane Cameron (Colombia) Juan Pablo Montoya (France) Simon Pagenaud	Acura AR35TT 3.5 L Turbo V6	C	203	Lost Power
40 DNF	P	7	(United States) Acura Team Penske	(Brazil) Hélio Castroneves (United States) Ricky Taylor (United States) Graham Rahal	Acura ARX-05	C	172	Engine
40 DNF	P	7	(United States) Acura Team Penske	(Brazil) Hélio Castroneves (United States) Ricky Taylor (United States) Graham Rahal	Acura AR35TT 3.5 L Turbo V6	C	172	Engine
41 DNF	GTD	64	(United States) Scuderia Corsa	(United States) Townsend Bell (United States) Frankie Montecalvo (United States) Bill Sweedler	Ferrari 488 GT3	C	9	Crash
41 DNF	GTD	64	(United States) Scuderia Corsa	(United States) Townsend Bell (United States) Frankie Montecalvo (United States) Bill Sweedler	Ferrari F154CB 3.9 L Turbo V8	C	9	Crash
42 (Note: The No. 71 P1 Motorsports entry originally finished 30th overall and 14th in the GTD class but was demoted to last in class after the race had finished for exceeding the maximum stint for a single driver.)	GTD	71	(United States) P1 Motorsports	(United States) Kenton Koch (Colombia) JC Perez (Italy) Loris Spinelli	Mercedes-AMG GT3	C	316	+28 laps
42	GTD	71	(United States) P1 Motorsports	(United States) Kenton Koch (Colombia) JC Perez (Italy) Loris Spinelli	Mercedes-AMG M159 6.2 L V8	C	316	+28 laps
43 DNS	P	2	(United States) Tequila Patrón ESM	(United Kingdom) Ryan Dalziel (United States) Scott Sharp (France) Olivier Pla	Nissan Onroak DPi	C	–	Did Not Start
43 DNS	P	2	(United States) Tequila Patrón ESM	(United Kingdom) Ryan Dalziel (United States) Scott Sharp (France) Olivier Pla	Nissan VR38DETT 3.8 L Turbo V6	C	–	Did Not Start

Tyre manufacturers
Key
Symbol	Tyre manufacturer
**C**	Continental
**MI**	Michelin

== Standings after the race ==
Prototype Drivers' Championship standings
Pos.	+/–	Driver	Points
1	1	(United States) Eric Curran (Brazil) Felipe Nasr (United Kingdom) Mike Conway	62
2	1	(United Kingdom) Jon Bennett (United States) Colin Braun (France) Romain Dumas	58
3	2	(Portugal) Filipe Albuquerque (Portugal) João Barbosa (Brazil) Christian Fittipaldi	56
4		(United Kingdom) Paul di Resta	54
5		(United Kingdom) Alex Brundle	52

GTLM Drivers' Championship standings
Pos.	+/–	Driver	Points
1		(Australia) Ryan Briscoe (New Zealand) Scott Dixon (United Kingdom) Richard Westbrook	63
2	6	(France) Patrick Pilet (United Kingdom) Nick Tandy (Germany) Frédéric Makowiecki	58
3	1	(New Zealand) Earl Bamber (Belgium) Laurens Vanthoor (Italy) Gianmaria Bruni	55
4	2	(France) Sébastien Bourdais (United States) Joey Hand (Germany) Dirk Müller	54
5	4	(United States) Connor De Phillippi (United Kingdom) Alexander Sims (United States) Bill Auberlen	54

GTD Drivers' Championship standings
Pos.	+/–	Driver	Points
1	2	(United States) Bryan Sellers (United States) Madison Snow	65
2	2	(Netherlands) Jeroen Bleekemolen (United States) Ben Keating (Germany) Luca Stolz	58
3	1	(United Kingdom) Katherine Legge (Portugal) Álvaro Parente (United States) Trent Hindman	55
4	6	(United States) Cooper MacNeil (United States) Gunnar Jeannette (Italy) Alessandro Balzan	53
5	2	(South Africa) Sheldon van der Linde (Germany) Christopher Mies	52

- Note: Only the top five positions are included for all sets of standings.

Prototype Teams' Championship standings
Pos.	+/–	Team	Points
1	1	(United States) No. 31 Whelen Engineering Racing	62
2	1	(United States) No. 54 CORE Autosport	58
3	2	(United States) No. 5 Mustang Sampling Racing	56
4		(United States) No. 32 United Autosports	54
5	13	(United States) No. 22 Tequila Patrón ESM	48

GTLM Teams' Championship standings
Pos.	+/–	Team	Points
1		(United States) No. 67 Ford Chip Ganassi Racing	63
2	2	(United States) No. 911 Porsche GT Team	58
3	2	(United States) No. 912 Porsche GT Team	55
4	2	(United States) No. 66 Ford Chip Ganassi Racing	54
5	4	(United States) No. 25 BMW Team RLL	54

GTD Teams' Championship standings
Pos.	+/–	Team	Points
1	2	(United States) No. 48 Paul Miller Racing	65
2	2	(United States) No. 33 Mercedes-AMG Team Riley Motorsports	58
3	1	(United States) No. 86 Michael Shank Racing with Curb-Agajanian	55
4	6	(United States) No. 63 Scuderia Corsa	53
5	2	(Germany) No. 29 Montaplast by Land-Motorsport	52

- Note: Only the top five positions are included for all sets of standings.

Prototype Manufacturers' Championship standings
Pos.	+/–	Manufacturer	Points
1		(United States) Cadillac	67
2	2	(Japan) Nissan	63
3	1	(United States) Acura	60
4	1	(Japan) Mazda	60

GTLM Manufacturers' Championship standings
Pos.	+/–	Manufacturer	Points
1		(United States) Ford	65
2	2	(Germany) Porsche	63
3	1	(United States) Chevrolet	58
4	1	(Germany) BMW	58
5	2	(Italy) Ferrari	58

GTD Manufacturers' Championship standings
Pos.	+/–	Manufacturer	Points
1		(Italy) Lamborghini	70
2	2	(Italy) Ferrari	60
3		(Germany) Mercedes-AMG	60
4	2	(United States) Acura	56
5		(Germany) Audi	54

- Note: Only the top five positions are included for all sets of standings.

IMSA SportsCar Championship
Previous race: 24 Hours of Daytona	2018 season	Next race: Grand Prix of Long Beach
