= Formula Mazda =

American open-wheel racing car formula

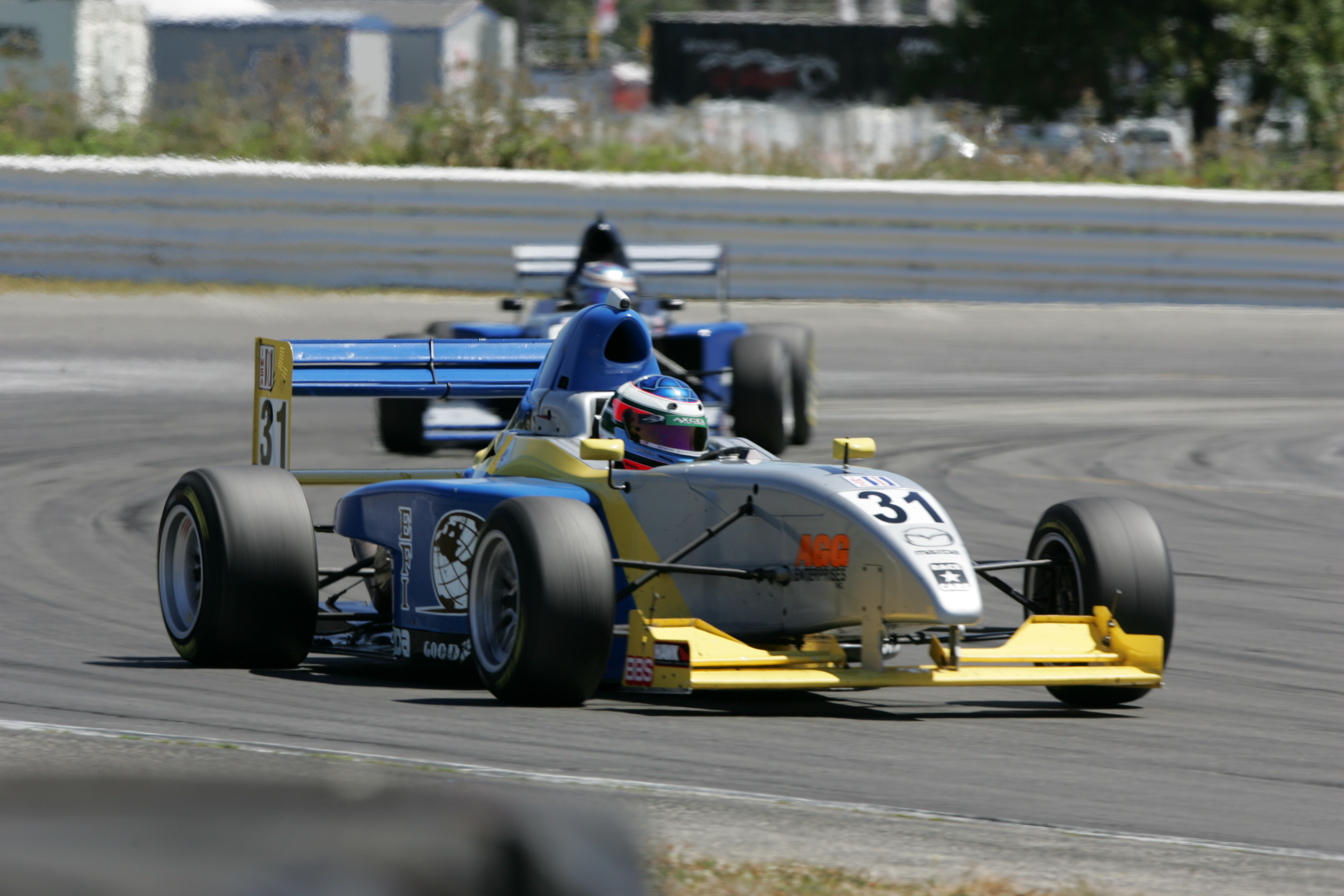
Second-generation carbon fiber Pro Mazda race car

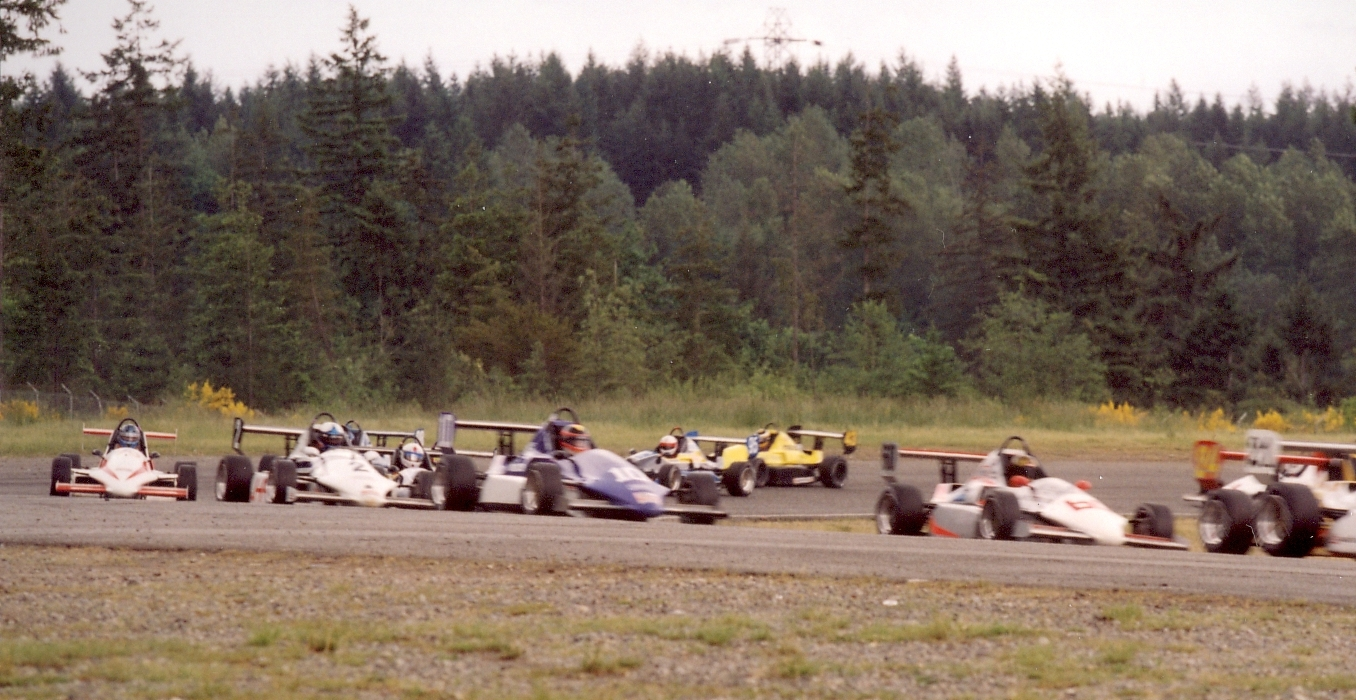
A field of original Formula Mazda race cars

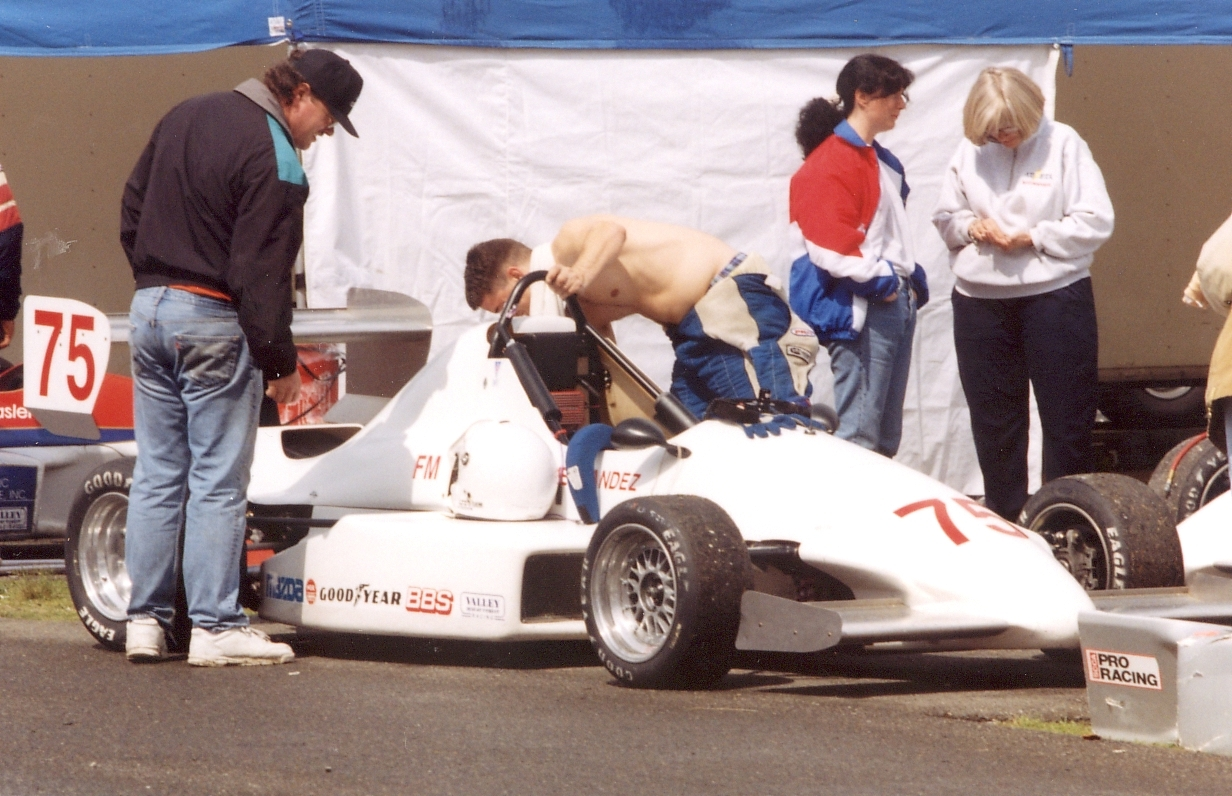
Original tube-frame car

Formula Mazda is a class of relatively affordable open-wheel car formula racing.

The original tube-frame Formula Mazda car had its own class in SCCA club racing from 1998 to 2019. The subsequent Pro Mazda Series, using an all-new car with carbon fiber construction became the Indy Pro 2000 Championship that is part of IndyCar's Road to Indy ladder system, using the Pro Mazda car until 2017. Many drivers aspiring to the top classes of racing used the pro series to hone and demonstrate their talent. The 2004 Formula Mazda champion, Michael McDowell, went on to Champ Car and NASCAR (winning the 2021 Daytona 500). 2006 Star Mazda race winner Scott Speed later raced in Formula One and NASCAR.

== Original car – Formula Mazda ==
The series originally grew out of five chassis built by Hayashi in Japan for the Jim Russell Racing Drivers School in California, USA. Twenty-five cars were built by Marc Bahner, Bahner Engineering, Calif., for the 1984 Long Beach Grand Prix, where the cars made their US debut. The majority of these cars were purchased by owner/operators. The original five chassis remained with the Russell School. The cars have a basic welded steel tube frame chassis, with in-board front shocks operated by upper rocker arms. A 180 hp carbureted Mazda rotary engine drives through a 5 speed H-pattern (H-gate) Hewland Mk 9 transaxle. Rear suspension is by two trailing links, an upper link and a lower a-arm. In the interest of creating close racing and limiting cost, the rules state that no modification is allowed until the rules expressly permit it—at one time even replacing the mirrors on the car was prohibited. The engines cannot be modified, and they are sealed to make it easy to detect cheating. The cars all use the same tires, springs, dampers, and adjustable anti-roll bars.

In September 2009, Moses Smith Racing, LLC. (MSR), headquartered at the time in Tempe, AZ, took over all support and manufacturing rights for the approximately 300 Formula Mazda rotary-powered race cars currently in use across North America, as well as the MSR sports racer, a full-bodied version of the FM. MSR has since moved to a new location at MotorSport Ranch (a country club style race track facility) in Cresson, TX.

== New car – Pro Formula Mazda ==
In 2004, a completely new car was introduced for the Pro series. It features a carbon fiber chassis, 6 speed sequential gearbox, and a sealed 250 hp fuel-injected Renesis engine very similar to the one in the Mazda RX-8. The MoTeC ECU uses input from the gearshift to enable upshifting while the driver holds the throttle wide open. The ECU also provides traction control which the driver can turn off from inside the car. The rules allow a choice among five different spring rates at each corner, and the new Öhlins dampers offer separate bump and rebound adjustments. The driver can adjust the front anti-roll bar from the cockpit.

The new car is substantially faster than the older car, usually lapping about 2-3 seconds faster per mile of track. The Pro Mazda remains legal for SCCA club racing in the Formula Atlantic class.

== End as a separate class ==
For 2020, Formula Mazda class was eliminated by the SCCA and replaced by Formula X, which is not a spec class and allows other cars of similar speed including Formula 4 and older U.S. F2000 National Championship cars not eligible for Formula Continental. In its first SCCA Runoffs, 11 of the 12 Formula X entries were Formula Mazda cars.

== Formula Mazda at the SCCA National Championship Runoffs ==
Year	Track	Winner
1998	Mid-Ohio	(United States) Tony Buffomante
1999	Mid-Ohio	(United States) Keith Roberts
2000	Mid-Ohio	(United States) Matthew Beardsley
2001	Mid-Ohio	(United States) Keith Roberts
2002	Mid-Ohio	(United States) Jamie Bach
2003	Mid-Ohio	(United States) Chris Schanzle
2004	Mid-Ohio	(United States) Douglas Peterson
2005	Mid-Ohio	(United States) Chris Schanzle
2006	Heartland Park	(United States) James Goughary, Jr.
2007	Heartland Park	(United States) James Goughary, Jr.
2008	Heartland Park	(United States) Franklin Futrelle
2009	Road America	(Puerto Rico) Juan Marchand
2010	Road America	(United States) Darryl Wills
2011	Road America	(United States) Darryl Wills
2012	Road America	(United States) Alan McCallum
2013	Road America	(United States) Darryl Wills
2014	Laguna Seca	(United States) Mike Anderson
2015	Daytona	(Australia) Joseph Burton-Harris
2016	Mid-Ohio	(United States) Matthew Machiko
2017	Indianapolis	(United States) Melvin Kemper, Jr.
2018	Sonoma	(United States) Bryce Cornet
2019	VIR	(United States) Anthony Seaber

2021 Indianapolis Sterling Hamilton
