= Darryl Wills =

American racing driver

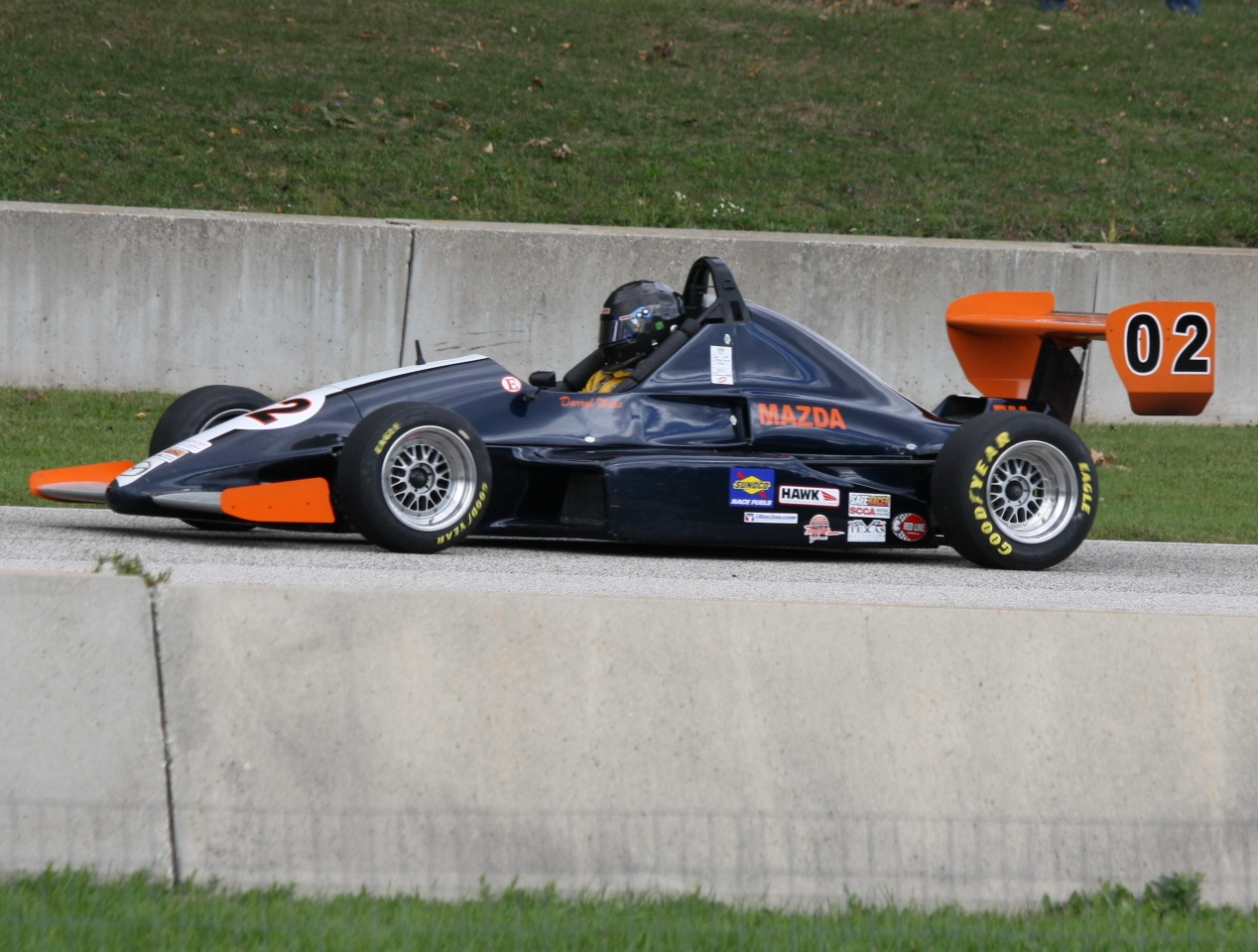
- Wills winning the 2010 SCCA National Runoffs
- Nationality: (United States) American
- Born: August 19, 1961 (age 65) Corpus Christi, Texas, U.S.

SCCA Formula Mazda career
- Current team: Hillenburg Motorsports
- Years active: 2010-2014
- Car number: 1
- Starts: 47
- Wins: 40
- Poles: 0
- Fastest laps: 0
- Best finish: 1

Previous series
- 2008-2013: SCCA Formula Mazda, Formula Car Challenge Series

Championship titles
- 2010, 2011, 2013: SCCA Formula Mazda National Champion, SCCA Super Sweep (2 times), SCCA Triple Crown Winner(2 times), 3 times AJ Foyt Driver of the Year

Darryl Wills (born August 19, 1961) is an American racing driver from Alvin, Texas.

Wills began sprint car racing in 2004 and competed in a World of Outlaws race in 2005. In 2008, he began racing in SCCA Formula Mazda competition with Hillenburg Motorsports, later finishing third at the SCCA National Championship Runoffs in 2009 and winning the Formula Mazda championship in the event in 2010. He won the Formula Mazda class at the June Sprints in 2011. He then won two more National Championships in 2011 and 2013 with the SCCA National Championship Runoffs. Other accolades include two time AJ Foyt Driver of the year, two-time winner of the prestigious Triple Crown Trophy and two time recipient of the SCCA Super Sweep Award.

Hillenburg Motorsports purchased two Firestone Indy Lights cars in November 2011 for Wills to compete in that series in 2012. The combination competed in the first three races of the season with a best finish of tenth in the season opener in St. Petersburg. Wills finished sixteenth in points.

Wills currently resides in Houston, Texas.

== Racing record ==
=== SCCA National Championship Runoffs ===
Year	Track	Car	Engine	Class	Finish	Start	Status
2003	Mid-Ohio	Star	Mazda	Formula Mazda	8	12	Running
2004	Mid-Ohio	Star	Mazda	Formula Mazda	7	5	Running
2009	Road America	Star	Mazda	Formula Mazda	3	2	Running
2010	Road America	Star	Mazda	Formula Mazda	1	4	Running
2011	Road America	Star	Mazda	Formula Mazda	1	1	Running
2012	Road America	Star	Mazda	Formula Mazda	4	5	Running
2013	Road America	Star	Mazda	Formula Mazda	1	3	Running
2014	Laguna Seca	Spec Racer	Ford	Spec Racer Ford	12	2	DNF
2014	Laguna Seca	Star	Mazda	Formula Mazda	4	5	Running
2019	VIR	Spec Racer	Ford	Spec Racer Ford Gen 3	23	26	DNF
2021	Indianapolis Motor Speedway	Van Diemen DP06	Mazda	Formula Enterprises 2	5	7	Running
2023	VIR	Van Diemen DP06	Mazda	Formula Enterprises 2	12	9	Running
2024	Road America	Van Diemen DP06	Mazda	Formula Enterprises 2	3	8	Running

=== American open–wheel racing results ===
(key)

==== Indy Lights ====
Year	Team	1	2	3	4	5	6	7	8	9	10	11	12	Rank	Points
2012	Hillenburg Motorsports	STP; 10	ALA; 11	LBH; 15	INDY	DET	MIL	IOW	TOR	EDM	TRO	BAL	FON	16th	54
