= 2013 Blancpain Endurance Series =

Sports season

Seasons
- ← 2012 2014 →

The 2013 Blancpain Endurance Series season was the third season of the Blancpain Endurance Series. The season commenced on 14 April at Monza and ended on 22 September at the Nürburgring. The season featured five rounds, with each race lasting for a duration of three hours besides the 24 Hours of Spa-Francorchamps and the 1000 km Nürburgring events.

== Calendar ==
In July 2012, the Stéphane Ratel Organisation announced the 2013 calendar. The calendar did not differ much from the previous season. Only the event at Navarra was discontinued.

Rnd	Circuit	Date	Report
1	Autodromo Nazionale Monza, Monza, Italy	14 April	Report
2	(United Kingdom) Silverstone Circuit, Silverstone, Great Britain	2 June	Report
3	Circuit Paul Ricard, Le Castellet, France	30 June	
4	Total 24 Hours of Spa, Circuit de Spa-Francorchamps, Belgium	28 July	Report
5	1000 km Nürburgring, Nürburgring, Nürburg, Germany	22 September	

== Entry list ==
On 8 April 2013, SRO released the provisional entry list for the first round at Monza.

2013 Entry List
Team	No.	Drivers	Car	Rounds
Pro Cup
(Belgium) Belgian Audi Club WRT	0	(Switzerland) Rahel Frey	Audi R8 LMS Ultra	4
(Belgium) Belgian Audi Club WRT	0	(New Zealand) Matt Halliday	Audi R8 LMS Ultra	4
(Belgium) Belgian Audi Club WRT	0	(Austria) Nikolaus Mayr-Melnhof	Audi R8 LMS Ultra	4
(Belgium) Belgian Audi Club WRT	1	(Monaco) Stéphane Ortelli	Audi R8 LMS Ultra	All
(Belgium) Belgian Audi Club WRT	1	(Belgium) Laurens Vanthoor	Audi R8 LMS Ultra	All
(Belgium) Belgian Audi Club WRT	1	(Germany) René Rast	Audi R8 LMS Ultra	1–4
(Belgium) Belgian Audi Club WRT	1	(Sweden) Edward Sandström	Audi R8 LMS Ultra	5
(Belgium) Belgian Audi Club WRT	2	(Switzerland) Rahel Frey	Audi R8 LMS Ultra	1–3, 5
(Belgium) Belgian Audi Club WRT	2	(New Zealand) Matt Halliday	Audi R8 LMS Ultra	1–3
(Belgium) Belgian Audi Club WRT	2	(Austria) Nikolaus Mayr-Melnhof	Audi R8 LMS Ultra	1–3, 5
(Belgium) Belgian Audi Club WRT	2	(Germany) André Lotterer	Audi R8 LMS Ultra	4
(Belgium) Belgian Audi Club WRT	2	(Germany) Christopher Mies	Audi R8 LMS Ultra	4
(Belgium) Belgian Audi Club WRT	2	(Germany) Frank Stippler	Audi R8 LMS Ultra	4
(Belgium) Belgian Audi Club WRT	2	(Italy) Francesco Castellacci	Audi R8 LMS Ultra	5
(Belgium) Belgian Audi Club WRT	13	(Sweden) Edward Sandström	Audi R8 LMS Ultra	1–4
(Belgium) Belgian Audi Club WRT	13	(Germany) Frank Stippler	Audi R8 LMS Ultra	1–3, 5
(Belgium) Belgian Audi Club WRT	13	(Germany) Christopher Mies	Audi R8 LMS Ultra	1–3, 5
(Belgium) Belgian Audi Club WRT	13	(Sweden) Mattias Ekström	Audi R8 LMS Ultra	4
(Belgium) Belgian Audi Club WRT	13	(Switzerland) Marcel Fässler	Audi R8 LMS Ultra	4
(Belgium) Belgian Audi Club WRT	13	(Germany) René Rast	Audi R8 LMS Ultra	5
(Belgium) Marc VDS Racing Team	3	(Netherlands) Yelmer Buurman	BMW Z4 GT3	All
(Belgium) Marc VDS Racing Team	3	(Belgium) Bas Leinders	BMW Z4 GT3	All
(Belgium) Marc VDS Racing Team	3	(Belgium) Maxime Martin	BMW Z4 GT3	All
(Belgium) Marc VDS Racing Team	4	(Netherlands) Nick Catsburg	BMW Z4 GT3	1–2, 4–5
(Belgium) Marc VDS Racing Team	4	(Switzerland) Henri Moser	BMW Z4 GT3	All
(Belgium) Marc VDS Racing Team	4	(Finland) Markus Palttala	BMW Z4 GT3	All
(Belgium) Marc VDS Racing Team	4	(Italy) Andrea Piccini	BMW Z4 GT3	3
(Belgium) Marc VDS Racing Team	14	(Italy) Andrea Piccini	BMW Z4 GT3	4
(Belgium) Marc VDS Racing Team	14	(Germany) Dirk Müller	BMW Z4 GT3	4
(Belgium) Marc VDS Racing Team	14	(Germany) Jens Klingmann	BMW Z4 GT3	4
(Germany) Phoenix Racing	6	(United Kingdom) Oliver Jarvis	Audi R8 LMS Ultra	All
(Germany) Phoenix Racing	6	(Germany) Christopher Haase	Audi R8 LMS Ultra	All
(Germany) Phoenix Racing	6	(Switzerland) Harold Primat	Audi R8 LMS Ultra	All
(Germany) Phoenix Racing	16	(Belgium) Enzo Ide	Audi R8 LMS Ultra	All
(Germany) Phoenix Racing	16	(Belgium) Anthony Kumpen	Audi R8 LMS Ultra	All
(Germany) Phoenix Racing	16	(Germany) Markus Winkelhock	Audi R8 LMS Ultra	All
(France) Hexis Racing	7	(Portugal) Álvaro Parente	McLaren MP4-12C GT3	All
(France) Hexis Racing	7	(United Kingdom) Alexander Sims	McLaren MP4-12C GT3	All
(France) Hexis Racing	7	(Netherlands) Stef Dusseldorp	McLaren MP4-12C GT3	All
(Germany) Haribo Racing Team	8	(Germany) Christian Menzel	Porsche 997 GT3-R	3
(Germany) Haribo Racing Team	8	(Germany) Mike Stursberg	Porsche 997 GT3-R	3
(Germany) Haribo Racing Team	8	(France) Emmanuel Collard	Porsche 997 GT3-R	3
(France) ART Grand Prix	11	(France) Antoine Leclerc	McLaren MP4-12C GT3	All
(France) ART Grand Prix	11	(France) Mike Parisy	McLaren MP4-12C GT3	All
(France) ART Grand Prix	11	(Spain) Andy Soucek	McLaren MP4-12C GT3	All
(Germany) Black Falcon	19	(Sweden) Andreas Simonsen	Mercedes-Benz SLS AMG GT3	5
(Germany) Black Falcon	19	(Germany) Hubert Haupt	Mercedes-Benz SLS AMG GT3	5
(Germany) Black Falcon	19	(Germany) Luca Ludwig	Mercedes-Benz SLS AMG GT3	5
(United Kingdom) JRM Racing	23	(Germany) Lucas Luhr	Nissan GT-R Nismo GT3	1–4
(United Kingdom) JRM Racing	23	(United Kingdom) Steven Kane	Nissan GT-R Nismo GT3	All
(United Kingdom) JRM Racing	23	(United Kingdom) Peter Dumbreck	Nissan GT-R Nismo GT3	All
(United Kingdom) JRM Racing	23	(Japan) Kazuki Hoshino	Nissan GT-R Nismo GT3	5
(Germany) Vita4One Racing Team	26	(Germany) Frank Kechele	BMW Z4 GT3	All
(Germany) Vita4One Racing Team	26	(Belgium) Greg Franchi	BMW Z4 GT3	All
(Germany) Vita4One Racing Team	26	(Italy) Stefano Colombo	BMW Z4 GT3	All
(Germany) Vita4One Racing Team	27	(Italy) Matteo Cressoni	BMW Z4 GT3	1
(Germany) Vita4One Racing Team	27	(Argentina) Matías Russo	BMW Z4 GT3	1
(Germany) Vita4One Racing Team	27	(Czech Republic) Martin Matzke	BMW Z4 GT3	1
(France) Pro GT by Alméras	33	(Germany) Timo Bernhard	Porsche 997 GT3-R	4
(France) Pro GT by Alméras	33	(Germany) Jörg Bergmeister	Porsche 997 GT3-R	4
(France) Pro GT by Alméras	33	(France) Nicolas Lapierre	Porsche 997 GT3-R	4
(France) Speed Car	36	(France) Vincent Abril	Audi R8 LMS Ultra	3
(France) Speed Car	36	(France) Andrea Pizzitola	Audi R8 LMS Ultra	3
(France) Speed Car	36	(France) Dino Lunardi	Audi R8 LMS Ultra	3
(France) Saintéloc Racing	40	(France) Grégory Guilvert	Audi R8 LMS Ultra	1–3
(France) Saintéloc Racing	40	(Germany) Alex Müller	Audi R8 LMS Ultra	1–3
(France) Saintéloc Racing	40	(Germany) Michael Ammermüller	Audi R8 LMS Ultra	1–2
(France) Saintéloc Racing	40	(Germany) Christian Mamerow	Audi R8 LMS Ultra	3
(Switzerland) Kessel Racing	44	(Italy) Daniel Zampieri	Ferrari 458 Italia GT3	All
(Switzerland) Kessel Racing	44	(Brazil) César Ramos	Ferrari 458 Italia GT3	All
(Switzerland) Kessel Racing	44	(Italy) Davide Rigon	Ferrari 458 Italia GT3	All
(Switzerland) Kessel Racing	111	(Italy) Giacomo Petrobelli	Ferrari 458 Italia GT3	3
(Switzerland) Kessel Racing	111	(Italy) Francesco Castellacci	Ferrari 458 Italia GT3	3
(Switzerland) Kessel Racing	111	(Italy) Andrea Ceccato	Ferrari 458 Italia GT3	3
Vita4One Team Italy	57	(Italy) Eugenio Amos	Ferrari 458 Italia GT3	1–2
Vita4One Team Italy	57	(Italy) Giacomo Petrobelli	Ferrari 458 Italia GT3	1–2
Vita4One Team Italy	57	(Italy) Francesco Castellacci	Ferrari 458 Italia GT3	1–2
(United Kingdom) Fortec Motorsport	62	(United Kingdom) Benji Hetherington	Mercedes-Benz SLS AMG GT3	2
(United Kingdom) Fortec Motorsport	62	(United Kingdom) Ollie Hancock	Mercedes-Benz SLS AMG GT3	2
(United Kingdom) Fortec Motorsport	62	(United Kingdom) Stephen Jelley	Mercedes-Benz SLS AMG GT3	2
(United Kingdom) Fortec Motorsport	62	(United Kingdom) Oli Webb	Mercedes-Benz SLS AMG GT3	4
(United Kingdom) Fortec Motorsport	62	(Austria) Karl Wendlinger	Mercedes-Benz SLS AMG GT3	4
(United Kingdom) Fortec Motorsport	62	(United Kingdom) Alex Brundle	Mercedes-Benz SLS AMG GT3	4
(United Kingdom) Gulf Racing UK	69	(United Kingdom) Rob Bell	McLaren MP4-12C GT3	All
(United Kingdom) Gulf Racing UK	69	(United Kingdom) Adam Carroll	McLaren MP4-12C GT3	All
(United Kingdom) Gulf Racing UK	69	(Belgium) Nico Verdonck	McLaren MP4-12C GT3	1–4
(United Kingdom) Gulf Racing UK	69	(United Kingdom) Tim Mullen	McLaren MP4-12C GT3	5
(Russia) SMP Racing	70	(Russia) Aleksey Basov	Ferrari 458 Italia GT3	1–3
(Russia) SMP Racing	70	(Russia) Alexander Skryabin	Ferrari 458 Italia GT3	1–3
(Russia) SMP Racing	70	(Italy) Alessandro Pier Guidi	Ferrari 458 Italia GT3	1–3
(Russia) SMP Racing	71	(Russia) Viktor Shaytar	Ferrari 458 Italia GT3	1–3
(Russia) SMP Racing	71	(Russia) Kirill Ladygin	Ferrari 458 Italia GT3	1, 3
(Russia) SMP Racing	71	(Russia) Mikhail Aleshin	Ferrari 458 Italia GT3	1, 3
(Russia) SMP Racing	71	(Russia) Devi Markozov	Ferrari 458 Italia GT3	2
(Russia) SMP Racing	71	(Finland) Mika Salo	Ferrari 458 Italia GT3	2
(Russia) SMP Racing	72	(Russia) Sergey Zlobin	Ferrari 458 Italia GT3	5
(Russia) SMP Racing	72	(Russia) Daniil Move	Ferrari 458 Italia GT3	5
(Russia) SMP Racing	72	(Russia) Mikhail Aleshin	Ferrari 458 Italia GT3	5
(Belgium) Prospeed Competition	75	(Belgium) Maxime Soulet	Porsche 997 GT3-R	All
(Belgium) Prospeed Competition	75	(Netherlands) Xavier Maassen	Porsche 997 GT3-R	All
(Belgium) Prospeed Competition	75	(Germany) Marc Hennerici	Porsche 997 GT3-R	All
(Belgium) Prospeed Competition	911	(Germany) Marco Holzer	Porsche 997 GT3-R	4
(Belgium) Prospeed Competition	911	(United Kingdom) Nick Tandy	Porsche 997 GT3-R	4
(Belgium) Prospeed Competition	911	(Italy) Marco Mapelli	Porsche 997 GT3-R	4
(Switzerland) Young Driver AMR / Emil Frey Racing	80	(Switzerland) Fredy Barth	Aston Martin V12 Vantage GT3	1
(Switzerland) Young Driver AMR / Emil Frey Racing	80	(Switzerland) Lorenz Frey	Aston Martin V12 Vantage GT3	1
(Switzerland) Young Driver AMR / Emil Frey Racing	80	(Switzerland) Gabriele Gardel	Aston Martin V12 Vantage GT3	1
(Switzerland) Emil Frey Racing	80	(Switzerland) Fredy Barth	Jaguar XK Emil Frey G3	5
(Switzerland) Emil Frey Racing	80	(Switzerland) Lorenz Frey	Jaguar XK Emil Frey G3	5
(Switzerland) Emil Frey Racing	80	(Switzerland) Gabriele Gardel	Jaguar XK Emil Frey G3	5
(France) SMG Challenge	83	(France) Nicolas Armindo	Porsche 997 GT3-R	1–3
(France) SMG Challenge	83	(France) Eric Clément	Porsche 997 GT3-R	1–3
(France) SMG Challenge	83	(Italy) Marco Mapelli	Porsche 997 GT3-R	1
(France) SMG Challenge	83	(France) Olivier Pla	Porsche 997 GT3-R	2–3
(Germany) HTP Motorsport	84	(Germany) Maximilian Buhk	Mercedes-Benz SLS AMG GT3	3–5
(Germany) HTP Motorsport	84	(Israel) Alon Day	Mercedes-Benz SLS AMG GT3	3
(Germany) HTP Motorsport	84	(Germany) Luca Ludwig	Mercedes-Benz SLS AMG GT3	3
(Germany) HTP Motorsport	84	(Germany) Maximilian Götz	Mercedes-Benz SLS AMG GT3	4–5
(Germany) HTP Motorsport	84	(Germany) Bernd Schneider	Mercedes-Benz SLS AMG GT3	4–5
(New Zealand) Von Ryan Racing	88	(United Kingdom) Rob Barff	McLaren MP4-12C GT3	4
(New Zealand) Von Ryan Racing	88	(United Kingdom) Chris Goodwin	McLaren MP4-12C GT3	4
(New Zealand) Von Ryan Racing	88	(Brazil) Bruno Senna	McLaren MP4-12C GT3	4
(Russia) Esta Motorsport	90	(Russia) Alexander Skryabin	Ferrari 458 Italia GT3	5
(Russia) Esta Motorsport	90	(Italy) Matteo Bobbi	Ferrari 458 Italia GT3	5
(Russia) Esta Motorsport	90	(Italy) Alessandro Pier Guidi	Ferrari 458 Italia GT3	5
(United Kingdom) Aston Martin Racing	97	(United Kingdom) Darren Turner	Aston Martin V12 Vantage GT3	2
(United Kingdom) Aston Martin Racing	97	(Germany) Stefan Mücke	Aston Martin V12 Vantage GT3	2
(United Kingdom) Aston Martin Racing	97	(France) Frédéric Makowiecki	Aston Martin V12 Vantage GT3	2
(Belgium) GPR AMR	100	(Belgium) Bertrand Baguette	Aston Martin V12 Vantage GT3	4
(Belgium) GPR AMR	100	(United Kingdom) Darren Turner	Aston Martin V12 Vantage GT3	4
(Belgium) GPR AMR	100	(United Kingdom) Jamie Campbell-Walter	Aston Martin V12 Vantage GT3	4
(Switzerland) Blancpain Racing	125	(Slovakia) Štefan Rosina	Lamborghini LP 600 FL2	3
(Switzerland) Blancpain Racing	125	(Germany) Albert von Thurn und Taxis	Lamborghini LP 600 FL2	3
(Switzerland) Blancpain Racing	125	(Netherlands) Jos Menten	Lamborghini LP 600 FL2	3
(Germany) Rowe Racing	127	(Germany) Jan Seyffarth	Mercedes-Benz SLS AMG GT3	4
(Germany) Rowe Racing	127	(Germany) Lance David Arnold	Mercedes-Benz SLS AMG GT3	4
(Germany) Rowe Racing	127	(Germany) Klaus Graf	Mercedes-Benz SLS AMG GT3	4
(Germany) Manthey Racing	150	(France) Patrick Pilet	Porsche 997 GT3-R	4
(Germany) Manthey Racing	150	(Germany) Marc Lieb	Porsche 997 GT3-R	4
(Germany) Manthey Racing	150	(Austria) Richard Lietz	Porsche 997 GT3-R	4
Pro-Am Cup
(Belgium) Boutsen Ginion	5	(Belgium) Koen Wauters	McLaren MP4-12C GT3	1, 3-5
(Belgium) Boutsen Ginion	5	(Belgium) David Dermont	McLaren MP4-12C GT3	1, 3-5
(Belgium) Boutsen Ginion	5	(Belgium) Frédéric Vervisch	McLaren MP4-12C GT3	1, 3-5
(Belgium) Boutsen Ginion	5	(France) Grégory Guilvert	McLaren MP4-12C GT3	4
(Germany) Haribo Racing Team	8	(Germany) Hans Guido Riegel	Porsche 997 GT3-R	1, 5
(Germany) Haribo Racing Team	8	(Germany) Mike Stursberg	Porsche 997 GT3-R	1, 5
(Germany) Haribo Racing Team	8	(United Kingdom) Richard Westbrook	Porsche 997 GT3-R	1, 5
(United Kingdom) Gulf Racing UK	9	(United Kingdom) Michael Wainwright	McLaren MP4-12C GT3	1–4
(United Kingdom) Gulf Racing UK	9	(United Kingdom) Andy Meyrick	McLaren MP4-12C GT3	1–4
(United Kingdom) Gulf Racing UK	9	(United Kingdom) Stuart Hall	McLaren MP4-12C GT3	4
(United Kingdom) Gulf Racing UK	9	(United Kingdom) Tim Mullen	McLaren MP4-12C GT3	4
(France) ART Grand Prix	12	(France) Grégoire Demoustier	McLaren MP4-12C GT3	All
(France) ART Grand Prix	12	(France) Gilles Vannelet	McLaren MP4-12C GT3	All
(France) ART Grand Prix	12	(France) Yann Goudy	McLaren MP4-12C GT3	All
(France) ART Grand Prix	12	(France) Ulrich Amado	McLaren MP4-12C GT3	4
(Denmark) Insight Racing with Flex Box	17	(Denmark) Dennis Andersen	Ferrari 458 Italia GT3	All
(Denmark) Insight Racing with Flex Box	17	(Denmark) Martin Jensen	Ferrari 458 Italia GT3	All
(Denmark) Insight Racing with Flex Box	17	(United Kingdom) Iain Dockerill	Ferrari 458 Italia GT3	4
(Germany) Black Falcon	18	(United Kingdom) Adam Christodoulou	Mercedes-Benz SLS AMG GT3	All
(Germany) Black Falcon	18	(Luxembourg) Steve Jans	Mercedes-Benz SLS AMG GT3	All
(Germany) Black Falcon	18	(Netherlands) Klaas Hummel	Mercedes-Benz SLS AMG GT3	All
(Germany) Black Falcon	18	(Germany) Thomas Jäger	Mercedes-Benz SLS AMG GT3	4
(Germany) Black Falcon	19	(Ukraine) Andrii Lebed	Mercedes-Benz SLS AMG GT3	2–4
(Germany) Black Falcon	19	(United Kingdom) Oliver Morley	Mercedes-Benz SLS AMG GT3	2–3
(Germany) Black Falcon	19	(United Kingdom) Duncan Tappy	Mercedes-Benz SLS AMG GT3	2–3
(Germany) Black Falcon	19	(Russia) Sergey Afanasyev	Mercedes-Benz SLS AMG GT3	4
(Germany) Black Falcon	19	(Italy) Francesco Castellacci	Mercedes-Benz SLS AMG GT3	4
(Germany) Black Falcon	19	(Sweden) Andreas Simonsen	Mercedes-Benz SLS AMG GT3	4
(United Kingdom) Preci Spark	22	(United Kingdom) David Jones	Mercedes-Benz SLS AMG GT3	2–3, 5
(United Kingdom) Preci Spark	22	(United Kingdom) Godfrey Jones	Mercedes-Benz SLS AMG GT3	2–3, 5
(United Kingdom) Preci Spark	22	(United Kingdom) Morgan Jones	Mercedes-Benz SLS AMG GT3	2–3, 5
(Switzerland) Blancpain Racing	24	(Switzerland) Marc A. Hayek	Lamborghini LP 560–4	1–2, 4
(Switzerland) Blancpain Racing	24	(Netherlands) Peter Kox	Lamborghini LP 560–4	1–2, 4
(Switzerland) Blancpain Racing	24	(Netherlands) Jos Menten	Lamborghini LP 560–4	4
(Switzerland) Blancpain Racing	24	(Netherlands) Henk Haane	Lamborghini LP 560–4	4
(Switzerland) Blancpain Racing	24	(Switzerland) Marc A. Hayek	Lamborghini LP 600 FL2	3
(Switzerland) Blancpain Racing	24	(Netherlands) Peter Kox	Lamborghini LP 600 FL2	3
(France) TDS Racing	25	(France) Henry Hassid	BMW Z4 GT3	All
(France) TDS Racing	25	(France) Ludovic Badey	BMW Z4 GT3	All
(France) TDS Racing	25	(France) Pierre Thiriet	BMW Z4 GT3	4
(France) TDS Racing	25	(Switzerland) Mathias Beche	BMW Z4 GT3	4
(United Kingdom) Nissan GT Academy Team RJN	32	(Germany) Peter Pyzera	Nissan GT-R Nismo GT3	1
(United Kingdom) Nissan GT Academy Team RJN	32	(Belgium) Wolfgang Reip	Nissan GT-R Nismo GT3	1–3
(United Kingdom) Nissan GT Academy Team RJN	32	(Russia) Mark Shulzhitskiy	Nissan GT-R Nismo GT3	All
(United Kingdom) Nissan GT Academy Team RJN	32	(United States) Steve Doherty	Nissan GT-R Nismo GT3	2–4
(United Kingdom) Nissan GT Academy Team RJN	32	(United Kingdom) Alex Buncombe	Nissan GT-R Nismo GT3	4–5
(United Kingdom) Nissan GT Academy Team RJN	32	(United Kingdom) Chris Buncombe	Nissan GT-R Nismo GT3	4
(United Kingdom) Nissan GT Academy Team RJN	32	(United Kingdom) Jann Mardenborough	Nissan GT-R Nismo GT3	5
(United Kingdom) Nissan GT Academy Team RJN	35	(United Kingdom) Alex Buncombe	Nissan GT-R Nismo GT3	1–3
(United Kingdom) Nissan GT Academy Team RJN	35	(United States) Steve Doherty	Nissan GT-R Nismo GT3	1
(United Kingdom) Nissan GT Academy Team RJN	35	(Spain) Lucas Ordóñez	Nissan GT-R Nismo GT3	All
(United Kingdom) Nissan GT Academy Team RJN	35	(Germany) Peter Pyzera	Nissan GT-R Nismo GT3	2–5
(United Kingdom) Nissan GT Academy Team RJN	35	(Belgium) Wolfgang Reip	Nissan GT-R Nismo GT3	4–5
(United Kingdom) Nissan GT Academy Team RJN	35	(United Kingdom) Jann Mardenborough	Nissan GT-R Nismo GT3	4
(France) Pro GT by Alméras	34	(France) Eric Dermont	Porsche 997 GT3-R	All
(France) Pro GT by Alméras	34	(France) Franck Perera	Porsche 997 GT3-R	All
(France) Pro GT by Alméras	34	(France) Philippe Giauque	Porsche 997 GT3-R	4
(France) Pro GT by Alméras	34	(France) Morgan Moulin Trafford	Porsche 997 GT3-R	4
(France) Saintéloc Racing	42	(Belgium) Ronnie Latinne	Audi R8 LMS Ultra	1–3
(France) Saintéloc Racing	42	(France) David Hallyday	Audi R8 LMS Ultra	1–3
(France) Saintéloc Racing	42	(France) Romain Monti	Audi R8 LMS Ultra	1–3
(Italy) ROAL Motorsport	43	(Italy) Michela Cerruti	BMW Z4 GT3	All
(Italy) ROAL Motorsport	43	(Italy) Stefano Comandini	BMW Z4 GT3	All
(Italy) ROAL Motorsport	43	(Italy) Edoardo Liberati	BMW Z4 GT3	1
(Italy) ROAL Motorsport	43	(Italy) Thomas Biagi	BMW Z4 GT3	2–3
(Italy) ROAL Motorsport	43	(Italy) Luca Rangoni	BMW Z4 GT3	4
(Belgium) Prospeed Competition	48	(United States) Charles Putman	Porsche 997 GT3-R	1
(Belgium) Prospeed Competition	48	(United States) Charles Espenlaub	Porsche 997 GT3-R	1
(Belgium) Prospeed Competition	48	(United States) Joe Foster	Porsche 997 GT3-R	1
(Italy) AF Corse	50	(Netherlands) Niek Hommerson	Ferrari 458 Italia GT3	All
(Italy) AF Corse	50	(Belgium) Louis Machiels	Ferrari 458 Italia GT3	All
(Italy) AF Corse	50	(Italy) Andrea Bertolini	Ferrari 458 Italia GT3	1–4
(Italy) AF Corse	50	(Italy) Marco Cioci	Ferrari 458 Italia GT3	4
(Italy) AF Corse	50	(Italy) Fabio Babini	Ferrari 458 Italia GT3	5
(Italy) AF Corse	59	(United Kingdom) Duncan Cameron	Ferrari 458 Italia GT3	4
(Italy) AF Corse	59	(Republic of Ireland) Matt Griffin	Ferrari 458 Italia GT3	4
(Italy) AF Corse	59	(United Kingdom) Alex Mortimer	Ferrari 458 Italia GT3	4
(Italy) AF Corse	59	(Finland) Toni Vilander	Ferrari 458 Italia GT3	4
(Italy) AF Corse	59	(Canada) Andrew Danyliw	Ferrari 458 Italia GT3	5
(Italy) AF Corse	59	(Italy) Matteo Beretta	Ferrari 458 Italia GT3	5
(Italy) AF Corse	59	(Czech Republic) Filip Salaquarda	Ferrari 458 Italia GT3	5
(United Kingdom) Mtech Racing	54	(United Kingdom) Jake Rattenbury	Ferrari 458 Italia GT3	1
(United Kingdom) Mtech Racing	54	(Canada) Andrew Danyliw	Ferrari 458 Italia GT3	1
(United Kingdom) Mtech Racing	54	(United Kingdom) Stephen Jelley	Ferrari 458 Italia GT3	1
(United Kingdom) Fortec Motorsport	62	(Canada) Andrew Danyliw	Mercedes-Benz SLS AMG GT3	3
(United Kingdom) Fortec Motorsport	62	(United Kingdom) Stephen Jelley	Mercedes-Benz SLS AMG GT3	3
(Russia) SMP Racing	70	(Russia) Aleksey Basov	Ferrari 458 Italia GT3	4
(Russia) SMP Racing	70	(Italy) Matteo Bobbi	Ferrari 458 Italia GT3	4
(Russia) SMP Racing	70	(Italy) Alessandro Pier Guidi	Ferrari 458 Italia GT3	4
(Russia) SMP Racing	70	(Russia) Alexander Skryabin	Ferrari 458 Italia GT3	4
(Russia) SMP Racing	71	(Russia) Kirill Ladygin	Ferrari 458 Italia GT3	4–5
(Russia) SMP Racing	71	(Italy) Maurizio Mediani	Ferrari 458 Italia GT3	4
(Russia) SMP Racing	71	(Finland) Mika Salo	Ferrari 458 Italia GT3	4
(Russia) SMP Racing	71	(Russia) Viktor Shaytar	Ferrari 458 Italia GT3	4–5
(Russia) SMP Racing	71	(Russia) Anton Ladygin	Ferrari 458 Italia GT3	5
(Russia) SMP Racing	72	(Russia) Boris Rotenberg	Ferrari 458 Italia GT3	1–3
(Russia) SMP Racing	72	(Russia) Daniil Move	Ferrari 458 Italia GT3	1
(Russia) SMP Racing	72	(Russia) Sergey Zlobin	Ferrari 458 Italia GT3	1-4
(Russia) SMP Racing	72	(Italy) Maurizio Mediani	Ferrari 458 Italia GT3	2–3
(Russia) SMP Racing	72	(Italy) Fabio Babini	Ferrari 458 Italia GT3	4
(Russia) SMP Racing	72	(Italy) Luca Persiani	Ferrari 458 Italia GT3	4
(Russia) SMP Racing	72	(Russia) Anton Ladygin	Ferrari 458 Italia GT3	4
(Russia) SMP Racing	73	(Russia) Yuri Evstigneev	Ferrari 458 Italia GT3	1–3
(Russia) SMP Racing	73	(Russia) Alexander Frolov	Ferrari 458 Italia GT3	All
(Russia) SMP Racing	73	(Russia) Devi Markozov	Ferrari 458 Italia GT3	1, 3–5
(Russia) SMP Racing	73	(Italy) Luca Persiani	Ferrari 458 Italia GT3	2, 5
(Russia) SMP Racing	73	(Russia) Mikhail Aleshin	Ferrari 458 Italia GT3	4
(Russia) SMP Racing	73	(Russia) Daniil Move	Ferrari 458 Italia GT3	4
(Germany) MRS GT Racing	77	(Brazil) Carlos Kray	McLaren MP4-12C GT3	1–2, 4
(Germany) MRS GT Racing	77	(United States) Rodin Younessi	McLaren MP4-12C GT3	1–2
(Germany) MRS GT Racing	77	(Austria) Philipp Eng	McLaren MP4-12C GT3	1, 4–5
(Germany) MRS GT Racing	77	(Argentina) Esteban Gini	McLaren MP4-12C GT3	2
(Germany) MRS GT Racing	77	(Venezuela) Justino Azcarate	McLaren MP4-12C GT3	4
(Germany) MRS GT Racing	77	(Russia) Ilya Melnikov	McLaren MP4-12C GT3	4
(Germany) MRS GT Racing	77	(Argentina) Alejandro González	McLaren MP4-12C GT3	5
(Germany) MRS GT Racing	77	(Argentina) Mauro Giallombardo	McLaren MP4-12C GT3	5
(Austria) GRT Grasser-Racing Team	78	(Austria) Hari Proczyk	Lamborghini LP 560–4	1–3
(Austria) GRT Grasser-Racing Team	78	(Austria) Gerhard Tweraser	Lamborghini LP 560–4	1–3
(Austria) GRT Grasser-Racing Team	78	(Austria) Gottfried Grasser	Lamborghini LP 560–4	1–3
(Switzerland) Emil Frey Racing	80	(Switzerland) Fredy Barth	Aston Martin V12 Vantage GT3	4
(Switzerland) Emil Frey Racing	80	(Switzerland) Lorenz Frey	Aston Martin V12 Vantage GT3	4
(Switzerland) Emil Frey Racing	80	(Switzerland) Gabriele Gardel	Aston Martin V12 Vantage GT3	4
(France) SMG Challenge	83	(France) Nicolas Armindo	Porsche 997 GT3-R	4
(France) SMG Challenge	83	(France) Eric Clément	Porsche 997 GT3-R	4
(France) SMG Challenge	83	(France) Olivier Pla	Porsche 997 GT3-R	4
(France) SMG Challenge	83	(Germany) Robert Renauer	Porsche 997 GT3-R	4
(New Zealand) Von Ryan Racing	88	(South Africa) Leon Price	McLaren MP4-12C GT3	1–3
(New Zealand) Von Ryan Racing	88	(United Kingdom) Rob Barff	McLaren MP4-12C GT3	1–3
(New Zealand) Von Ryan Racing	88	(South Africa) Jordan Grogor	McLaren MP4-12C GT3	1–3
(Belgium) GPR AMR	89	(Belgium) Sarah Bovy	Aston Martin V12 Vantage GT3	4
(Belgium) GPR AMR	89	(Belgium) Pierre Grivegnee	Aston Martin V12 Vantage GT3	4
(Belgium) GPR AMR	89	(Belgium) Bert Redant	Aston Martin V12 Vantage GT3	4
(Belgium) GPR AMR	89	(Belgium) Michael Schmetz	Aston Martin V12 Vantage GT3	4
(Switzerland) Fach Auto Tech	98	(Germany) Sebastian Asch	Porsche 997 GT3-R	4
(Switzerland) Fach Auto Tech	98	(Germany) Otto Klohs	Porsche 997 GT3-R	4
(Switzerland) Fach Auto Tech	98	(Austria) Martin Ragginger	Porsche 997 GT3-R	4
(Switzerland) Fach Auto Tech	98	(Germany) Jens Richter	Porsche 997 GT3-R	4
(United Kingdom) Beechdean-Aston Martin Racing	99	(United Kingdom) Jonny Adam	Aston Martin V12 Vantage GT3	1–4
(United Kingdom) Beechdean-Aston Martin Racing	99	(United Kingdom) Andrew Howard	Aston Martin V12 Vantage GT3	1–4
(United Kingdom) Beechdean-Aston Martin Racing	99	(United Kingdom) Daniel McKenzie	Aston Martin V12 Vantage GT3	1–4
(United Kingdom) Beechdean-Aston Martin Racing	99	(Germany) Stefan Mücke	Aston Martin V12 Vantage GT3	4
(France) Hexis Racing	107	(France) Laurent Cazenave	McLaren MP4-12C GT3	4
(France) Hexis Racing	107	(France) Eric Debard	McLaren MP4-12C GT3	4
(France) Hexis Racing	107	(France) Côme Ledogar	McLaren MP4-12C GT3	4
(France) Hexis Racing	107	(France) Olivier Panis	McLaren MP4-12C GT3	4
(Switzerland) Kessel Racing	111	(Italy) Marco Zanuttini	Ferrari 458 Italia GT3	1
(Switzerland) Kessel Racing	111	(Italy) Stefano Gattuso	Ferrari 458 Italia GT3	1
(Switzerland) Kessel Racing	111	(Italy) Thomas Kemenater	Ferrari 458 Italia GT3	1
(France) SOFREV Auto Sport Promotion	116	(France) Gérard Tonelli	Ferrari 458 Italia GT3	3
(France) SOFREV Auto Sport Promotion	116	(France) Fabien Barthez	Ferrari 458 Italia GT3	3
(France) SOFREV Auto Sport Promotion	116	(France) Morgan Moulin Trafford	Ferrari 458 Italia GT3	3
Team Ukraine	123	(Ukraine) Ruslan Tsyplakov	Ferrari 458 Italia GT3	1-4
Team Ukraine	123	(Ukraine) Andrii Kruglyk	Ferrari 458 Italia GT3	All
Team Ukraine	123	(Italy) Raffaele Giammaria	Ferrari 458 Italia GT3	All
Team Ukraine	123	(Italy) Matteo Malucelli	Ferrari 458 Italia GT3	4
Team Ukraine	123	(Ukraine) Andrii Lebed	Ferrari 458 Italia GT3	5
(United States) United Autosports	125	(United Kingdom) Will Bratt	Audi R8 LMS Ultra	4
(United States) United Autosports	125	(United Kingdom) Glynn Geddie	Audi R8 LMS Ultra	4
(United States) United Autosports	125	(Hong Kong) Alain Li	Audi R8 LMS Ultra	4
(United States) United Autosports	125	(South Africa) Mark Patterson	Audi R8 LMS Ultra	4
(United Kingdom) Barwell Motorsport	180	(United Kingdom) Joe Osborne	Aston Martin V12 Vantage GT3	2
(United Kingdom) Barwell Motorsport	180	(United Kingdom) Richard Abra	Aston Martin V12 Vantage GT3	2
(United Kingdom) Barwell Motorsport	180	(United Kingdom) Mark Poole	Aston Martin V12 Vantage GT3	2
(Luxembourg) DKR Engineering	188	(Belgium) Michaël Albert	BMW Z4 GT3	4–5
(Luxembourg) DKR Engineering	188	(Belgium) Bernard Delhez	BMW Z4 GT3	4–5
(Luxembourg) DKR Engineering	188	(France) Dimitri Enjalbert	BMW Z4 GT3	4
(Luxembourg) DKR Engineering	188	(Italy) Stefano Gattuso	BMW Z4 GT3	4
(United Kingdom) JRM Racing	230	(United Arab Emirates) Humaid Al Masaood	Nissan GT-R Nismo GT3	1–4
(United Kingdom) JRM Racing	230	(United Kingdom) Charles Bateman	Nissan GT-R Nismo GT3	1–4
(United Kingdom) JRM Racing	230	(United Kingdom) Matt Bell	Nissan GT-R Nismo GT3	1–4
(United Kingdom) JRM Racing	230	(United Kingdom) Jody Fannin	Nissan GT-R Nismo GT3	4
(Monaco) JMB Racing	555	(France) Nicolas Misslin	Nissan GT-R Nismo GT3	3
(Monaco) JMB Racing	555	(United Kingdom) Jody Fannin	Nissan GT-R Nismo GT3	3
(Monaco) JMB Racing	555	(France) Nicolas Marroc	Nissan GT-R Nismo GT3	3
Gentlemen Trophy
(France) SOFREV Auto Sport Promotion	10	(France) Gabriel Balthazard	Ferrari 458 Italia GT3	1–3, 5
(France) SOFREV Auto Sport Promotion	10	(France) Maurice Ricci	Ferrari 458 Italia GT3	1–3, 5
(France) SOFREV Auto Sport Promotion	10	(France) Jérôme Policand	Ferrari 458 Italia GT3	1–3, 5
(France) SOFREV Auto Sport Promotion	20	(France) Jean-Luc Beaubélique	Ferrari 458 Italia GT3	All
(France) SOFREV Auto Sport Promotion	20	(France) Jean-Luc Blanchemain	Ferrari 458 Italia GT3	All
(France) SOFREV Auto Sport Promotion	20	(France) Patrice Goueslard	Ferrari 458 Italia GT3	All
(France) SOFREV Auto Sport Promotion	20	(Belgium) Fred Bouvy	Ferrari 458 Italia GT3	4
(Belgium) Boutsen Ginion	15	(Saudi Arabia) Karim Ojjeh	McLaren MP4-12C GT3	All
(Belgium) Boutsen Ginion	15	(France) Marlene Broggi	McLaren MP4-12C GT3	All
(Belgium) Boutsen Ginion	15	(Belgium) Christophe de Fierlant	McLaren MP4-12C GT3	1, 4
(Belgium) Boutsen Ginion	15	(United Kingdom) John Hartshorne	McLaren MP4-12C GT3	2
(Belgium) Boutsen Ginion	15	(France) Laurent Pasquali	McLaren MP4-12C GT3	3-4
(Germany) Black Falcon	19	(United Kingdom) Robert Hissom	Mercedes-Benz SLS AMG GT3	1
(Germany) Black Falcon	19	(United Kingdom) Oliver Morley	Mercedes-Benz SLS AMG GT3	1
(Germany) Black Falcon	19	(Ukraine) Andrii Lebed	Mercedes-Benz SLS AMG GT3	1
(France) Chab Evolution	21	(Switzerland) Pierre Hischi	Ferrari 458 Italia GT3	5
(France) Chab Evolution	21	(France) Claude-Yves Gosselin	Ferrari 458 Italia GT3	5
(France) Chab Evolution	21	(France) Marc Rostan	Ferrari 458 Italia GT3	5
(United Kingdom) Preci Spark	22	(United Kingdom) David Jones	Mercedes-Benz SLS AMG GT3	1, 4
(United Kingdom) Preci Spark	22	(United Kingdom) Godfrey Jones	Mercedes-Benz SLS AMG GT3	1, 4
(United Kingdom) Preci Spark	22	(United Kingdom) Gareth Jones	Mercedes-Benz SLS AMG GT3	4
(United Kingdom) Preci Spark	22	(United Kingdom) Philip Jones	Mercedes-Benz SLS AMG GT3	4
(France) Pro GT by Alméras	33	(France) Christian Blugeon	Porsche 997 GT3-R	1–3
(France) Pro GT by Alméras	33	(Switzerland) Nicolas Armengol	Porsche 997 GT3-R	1–2
(France) Pro GT by Alméras	33	(France) Philippe Giauque	Porsche 997 GT3-R	1
(France) Pro GT by Alméras	33	(France) Stéphane Wintenberger	Porsche 997 GT3-R	2–3
(France) Pro GT by Alméras	33	(France) Cédric Mezart	Porsche 997 GT3-R	3
(France) Saintéloc Racing	41	(Switzerland) Pierre Hirschi	Audi R8 LMS Ultra	1–3
(France) Saintéloc Racing	41	(France) Claude-Yves Gosselin	Audi R8 LMS Ultra	1–3
(France) Saintéloc Racing	41	(France) Marc Sourd	Audi R8 LMS Ultra	1
(France) Saintéloc Racing	41	(Belgium) Stéphane Lémeret	Audi R8 LMS Ultra	3
(Belgium) Prospeed Competition	48	(Belgium) Didier Grandjean	Porsche 997 GT3-Cup	4
(Belgium) Prospeed Competition	48	(Sweden) Carl Rosenblad	Porsche 997 GT3-Cup	4
(Belgium) Prospeed Competition	48	(United Kingdom) Martin Rich	Porsche 997 GT3-Cup	4
(Belgium) Prospeed Competition	48	(Netherlands) Mathijs Harkema	Porsche 997 GT3-Cup	4
(Belgium) Prospeed Competition	48	(United States) Charles Putman	Porsche 997 GT3-Cup	5
(Belgium) Prospeed Competition	48	(United States) Charles Espenlaub	Porsche 997 GT3-Cup	5
(Belgium) Prospeed Competition	48	(United States) Joe Foster	Porsche 997 GT3-Cup	5
(Italy) AF Corse	49	(United States) Howard Blank	Ferrari 458 Italia GT3	2–5
(Italy) AF Corse	49	(France) Jean-Marc Bachelier	Ferrari 458 Italia GT3	2–5
(Italy) AF Corse	49	(France) Yannick Mallegol	Ferrari 458 Italia GT3	2–5
(Italy) AF Corse	49	(France) François Perrodo	Ferrari 458 Italia GT3	4
(Italy) AF Corse	51	(Portugal) Filipe Barreiros	Ferrari 458 Italia GT3	1–5
(Italy) AF Corse	51	(Portugal) Francisco Guedes	Ferrari 458 Italia GT3	1–5
(Italy) AF Corse	51	(United Kingdom) Peter Mann	Ferrari 458 Italia GT3	2–5
(Italy) AF Corse	51	(France) Cédric Mézard	Ferrari 458 Italia GT3	4
(France) Sport Garage	52	(France) Lionel Comole	Ferrari 458 Italia GT3	1–2
(France) Sport Garage	52	(France) Thierry Prignauld	Ferrari 458 Italia GT3	1, 4
(France) Sport Garage	52	(France) Thierry Stepec	Ferrari 458 Italia GT3	1
(France) Sport Garage	52	(France) Luc Paillard	Ferrari 458 Italia GT3	2–3
(France) Sport Garage	52	(France) Bruce Lorgère-Roux	Ferrari 458 Italia GT3	2–3, 5
(France) Sport Garage	52	(Italy) Beniamino Caccia	Ferrari 458 Italia GT3	3
(France) Sport Garage	52	(France) Romain Brandela	Ferrari 458 Italia GT3	4
(France) Sport Garage	52	(Italy) Leonardo Gorini	Ferrari 458 Italia GT3	4
(France) Sport Garage	52	(Belgium) Stéphane Lémeret	Ferrari 458 Italia GT3	4
(France) Sport Garage	52	(Venezuela) Justino Azcarate	Ferrari 458 Italia GT3	5
(France) Sport Garage	52	(France) Éric Cayrolle	Ferrari 458 Italia GT3	5
(France) Sport Garage	53	(Italy) Leonardo Gorini	Ferrari 458 Italia GT3	1–3, 5
(France) Sport Garage	53	(France) George Cabanne	Ferrari 458 Italia GT3	1–3
(France) Sport Garage	53	(France) Romain Brandela	Ferrari 458 Italia GT3	1–2
(France) Sport Garage	53	(France) Michaël Petit	Ferrari 458 Italia GT3	3
(France) Sport Garage	53	(Italy) Beniamino Caccia	Ferrari 458 Italia GT3	4
(France) Sport Garage	53	(France) Jerome Demay	Ferrari 458 Italia GT3	4
(France) Sport Garage	53	(France) Gilles Duqueine	Ferrari 458 Italia GT3	4
(France) Sport Garage	53	(France) Philippe Marie	Ferrari 458 Italia GT3	4
(France) Sport Garage	53	(France) Philippe Thirion	Ferrari 458 Italia GT3	5
(France) Sport Garage	53	(France) Olivier Pernaut	Ferrari 458 Italia GT3	5
(France) Sport Garage	57	(France) Wilfried Merafina	Ferrari 458 Italia GT3	4
(France) Sport Garage	57	(France) Manu Orgeval	Ferrari 458 Italia GT3	4
(France) Sport Garage	57	(France) Pierre Perret	Ferrari 458 Italia GT3	4
(France) Sport Garage	57	(France) Michaël Petit	Ferrari 458 Italia GT3	4
(United Kingdom) Mtech Racing	55	(Argentina) Fabian Taraborelli	Ferrari 458 Italia GT3	1–3
(United Kingdom) Mtech Racing	55	(Argentina) Diego Menendez	Ferrari 458 Italia GT3	1, 3
(United Kingdom) Mtech Racing	55	(Argentina) Jorge Gomez	Ferrari 458 Italia GT3	1
(United Kingdom) Mtech Racing	55	(Argentina) Alejandro Chahwan	Ferrari 458 Italia GT3	2
(United Kingdom) Mtech Racing	55	(Argentina) Andres Josephsohn	Ferrari 458 Italia GT3	2
(United Kingdom) Mtech Racing	55	(United Kingdom) Jake Rattenbury	Ferrari 458 Italia GT3	3
(Belgium) Delahaye Racing / Royal Ecurie Ardennes	58	(Belgium) Christian Kelders	Porsche 997 GT3-R	All
(Belgium) Delahaye Racing / Royal Ecurie Ardennes	58	(France) Daniel Desbruères	Porsche 997 GT3-R	All
(Belgium) Delahaye Racing / Royal Ecurie Ardennes	58	(Switzerland) Pierre Hirschi	Porsche 997 GT3-R	4
(Belgium) Delahaye Racing / Royal Ecurie Ardennes	58	(France) Marc Rostan	Porsche 997 GT3-R	4
(Slovakia) ARC Bratislava	66	(Slovakia) Miro Konôpka	Porsche 997 GT3-R	All
(Slovakia) ARC Bratislava	66	(Oman) Ahmad Al Harthy	Porsche 997 GT3-R	All
(Slovakia) ARC Bratislava	66	(Slovakia) Jan Raska	Porsche 997 GT3-R	4
(Slovakia) ARC Bratislava	66	(Germany) Marco Schelp	Porsche 997 GT3-R	4
(Germany) MRS GT Racing	76	(Venezuela) Pablo Paladino	McLaren MP4-12C GT3	3
(Germany) MRS GT Racing	76	(Venezuela) Paolo Andreasi	McLaren MP4-12C GT3	3
(Germany) MRS GT Racing	76	(Venezuela) Gaetano Ardagna Perez	McLaren MP4-12C GT3	3
(Germany) MRS GT Racing	77	(Brazil) Carlos Kray	McLaren MP4-12C GT3	3
(Germany) MRS GT Racing	77	(Austria) Philipp Eng	McLaren MP4-12C GT3	3
(Germany) MRS GT Racing	77	(Venezuela) Justino Azcarate	McLaren MP4-12C GT3	3
(Switzerland) Kessel Racing	79	(Italy) Lorenzo Bontempelli	Ferrari 458 Italia GT3	1
(Switzerland) Kessel Racing	79	(Italy) Beniamino Caccia	Ferrari 458 Italia GT3	1
(Switzerland) Kessel Racing	79	(Italy) Alessandro Garofano	Ferrari 458 Italia GT3	1
(Switzerland) Kessel Racing	111	(Venezuela) Pablo Paladino	Ferrari 458 Italia GT3	4–5
(Switzerland) Kessel Racing	111	(Venezuela) Paolo Andreasi	Ferrari 458 Italia GT3	4–5
(Switzerland) Kessel Racing	111	(Venezuela) Gaetano Ardagna Perez	Ferrari 458 Italia GT3	4–5
(Switzerland) Kessel Racing	111	(Italy) Giuseppe Ciro	Ferrari 458 Italia GT3	4
(Belgium) SpeedLover	94	(Belgium) Jean-Michel Gerome	Porsche 997 GT3-Cup	4
(Belgium) SpeedLover	94	(Belgium) Wim Meulders	Porsche 997 GT3-Cup	4
(Belgium) SpeedLover	94	(Netherlands) Rik Renanms	Porsche 997 GT3-Cup	4
(Belgium) SpeedLover	94	(France) Philippe Richard	Porsche 997 GT3-Cup	4
(United Kingdom) PGF-Kinfaun AMR	96	(United Kingdom) John Gaw	Aston Martin V12 Vantage GT3	2
(United Kingdom) PGF-Kinfaun AMR	96	(United Kingdom) Phil Dryburgh	Aston Martin V12 Vantage GT3	2
(Germany) GT Corse	458	(Germany) Alexander Mattschull	Ferrari 458 Italia GT3	5
(Germany) GT Corse	458	(Germany) Pierre Ehret	Ferrari 458 Italia GT3	5
(Germany) GT Corse	458	(Germany) Christian Kohlhaas	Ferrari 458 Italia GT3	5

== Results and standings ==
=== Race results ===
Rnd.	Circuit	PRO Winners	PRO-AM Winners	Gentlemen Winners
1	Monza	(Switzerland) No. 44 Kessel Racing	(Italy) No. 50 AF Corse	(France) No. 20 SOFREV Auto Sport Promotion
1	Monza	(Brazil) César Ramos (Italy) Davide Rigon (Italy) Daniel Zampieri	(Netherlands) Niek Hommerson (Belgium) Louis Machiels (Italy) Andrea Bertolini	(France) Jean-Luc Beaubélique (France) Patrice Goueslard (France) Jean-Luc Blanchemain
2	Silverstone	(United Kingdom) No. 97 Aston Martin Racing	(United Kingdom) No. 35 Nissan GT Academy Team RJN	(Slovakia) No. 66 ARC Bratislava
2	Silverstone	(United Kingdom) Darren Turner (Germany) Stefan Mücke (France) Frédéric Makowiecki	(Spain) Lucas Ordóñez (United Kingdom) Alex Buncombe (Germany) Peter Pyzera	(Slovakia) Miro Konôpka (Oman) Ahmad Al Harthy
3	Paul Ricard	(Belgium) No. 3 Marc VDS Racing Team	(Belgium) No. 5 Boutsen Ginion	(France) No. 20 SOFREV Auto Sport Promotion
3	Paul Ricard	(Belgium) Bas Leinders (Belgium) Maxime Martin (Netherlands) Yelmer Buurman	(Belgium) Koen Wauters (Belgium) David Dermont (Belgium) Frédéric Vervisch	(France) Jean-Luc Beaubélique (France) Patrice Goueslard (France) Jean-Luc Blanchemain
4	Spa-Francorchamps	(Germany) No. 84 HTP Motorsport	(Italy) No. 59 AF Corse	(France) No. 20 SOFREV Auto Sport Promotion
4	Spa-Francorchamps	(Germany) Maximilian Buhk (Germany) Maximilian Götz (Germany) Bernd Schneider	(United Kingdom) Duncan Cameron (Republic of Ireland) Matt Griffin (United Kingdom) Alex Mortimer (Finland) Toni Vilander	(France) Jean-Luc Beaubélique (France) Patrice Goueslard (France) Jean-Luc Blanchemain
5	Nürburgring	(Germany) No. 84 HTP Motorsport	(Russia) No. 71 SMP Racing	(France) No. 52 Sport Garage
5	Nürburgring	(Germany) Maximilian Buhk (Germany) Maximilian Götz (Germany) Bernd Schneider	(Russia) Kirill Ladygin (Russia) Viktor Shaytar (Russia) Anton Ladygin	(France) Bruce Lorgère-Roux (Venezuela) Justino Azcarate (France) Éric Cayrolle

== Championship standings ==
Scoring system

Championship points were awarded for the first ten positions in each Championship Race. Entries were required to complete 75% of the winning car's race distance in order to be classified and earn points. Individual drivers were required to participate for a minimum of 25 minutes in order to earn championship points in any race. There were no points awarded for the Pole Position.

Championship Race points

Position	1st	2nd	3rd	4th	5th	6th	7th	8th	9th	10th
Points	25	18	15	12	10	8	6	4	2	1

1000 km Paul Ricard points

Position	1st	2nd	3rd	4th	5th	6th	7th	8th	9th	10th
Points	33	24	19	15	12	9	6	4	2	1

24 Hours of Spa points

Points were awarded after six hours, after twelve hours and at the finish.

Position	1st	2nd	3rd	4th	5th	6th	7th	8th	9th	10th
Points after 6hrs/12hrs	12	9	7	6	5	4	3	2	1	0
Points at the finish	25	18	15	12	10	8	6	4	2	1

=== Drivers' Championships ===
==== Pro Cup ====
Pos.	Driver	Team	MNZ (Italy)	SIL (United Kingdom)	LEC (France)	SPA (Belgium)			NÜR (Germany)	Total
Pos.	Driver	Team	MNZ (Italy)	SIL (United Kingdom)	LEC (France)	6hrs	12hrs	24hrs	NÜR (Germany)	Total
1	(Germany) Maximilian Buhk	(Germany) HTP Motorsport			5	4	3	1	1	81
2	(Germany) Maximilian Götz (Germany) Bernd Schneider	(Germany) HTP Motorsport				4	3	1	1	71
2	(Belgium) Maxime Martin (Belgium) Bas Leinders (Netherlands) Yelmer Buurman	(Belgium) Marc VDS Racing Team	7	Ret	1	3	2	Ret	2	71
3	(Italy) Davide Rigon (Italy) Daniel Zampieri (Brazil) César Ramos	(Switzerland) Kessel Racing	1	6	4	18	7	Ret	20	50
4	(Germany) Frank Stippler (Germany) Christopher Mies	(Belgium) Belgian Audi Club WRT	4	3	27	10	6	3	Ret	48
5	(Spain) Andy Soucek (France) Mike Parisy (France) Antoine Leclerc	(France) ART Grand Prix	2	Ret	8	Ret	Ret	Ret	3	41
6	(Germany) Marc Lieb (Austria) Richard Lietz (France) Patrick Pilet	(Germany) Manthey Racing				2	1	2		39
6	(United Kingdom) Peter Dumbreck (United Kingdom) Steven Kane	(United Kingdom) JR Motorsports	22	4	3	40	39	Ret	6	39
7	(Finland) Markus Palttala (Switzerland) Henri Moser (Netherlands) Nicky Catsburg	(Belgium) Marc VDS Racing Team	36	5	21	1	Ret	Ret	7	31
8	(Germany) Lucas Luhr	(United Kingdom) JR Motorsports	22	4	3	40	39	Ret		27
9	(United Kingdom) Darren Turner (France) Frederick Makowiecki (Germany) Stefan Mücke	(United Kingdom) Aston Martin Racing		1						25
9	(United Kingdom) Adam Carroll (United Kingdom) Rob Bell (Belgium) Nico Verdonck	(United Kingdom) Gulf Racing UK	3	11	10	15	8	14	Ret	25
9	(Italy) Alessandro Pier Guidi (Russia) Alexander Skryabin	(Russia) SMP Racing	9	24	6				4	25
10	(Netherlands) Stef Dusseldorp (United Kingdom) Alexander Sims (Portugal) Álvaro Parente	(France) Hexis Racing	25	7	2	44	Ret	Ret	Ret	24
10	(Monaco) Stéphane Ortelli (Belgium) Laurens Vanthoor	(Belgium) Belgian Audi Club WRT	8	2	9	Ret	Ret	Ret	16	24
10	(Germany) René Rast	(Belgium) Belgian Audi Club WRT	8	2	9	Ret	Ret	Ret	Ret	24
10	(United Kingdom) Oliver Jarvis (Germany) Christopher Haase (Switzerland) Harold Primat	(Germany) Phoenix Racing	6	12	17	9	9	4	11	24

Colour	Result
Gold	Winner
Silver	Second place
Bronze	Third place
Green	Points classification
Blue	Non-points classification
Blue	Non-classified finish (NC)
Purple	Retired, not classified (Ret)
Red	Did not qualify (DNQ)
Red	Did not pre-qualify (DNPQ)
Black	Disqualified (DSQ)
White	Did not start (DNS)
White	Withdrew (WD)
White	Race cancelled (C)
Blank	Did not practice (DNP)
Blank	Did not arrive (DNA)
Blank	Excluded (EX)

==== Pro-Am Cup ====
Pos	Driver	Points
1	(Spain) Lucas Ordóñez	66
2	(Russia) Kirill Ladygin	63
2	(Russia) Viktor Shaytar	63
3	(Germany) Peter Pyzera	62
4	(United Kingdom) Alex Buncombe	53
5	(Italy) Andrea Bertolini	50
5	(Netherlands) Niek Hommerson	50
5	(Belgium) Louis Machiels	50
6	(United Kingdom) Adam Christodoulou	50
6	(Netherlands) Klaas Hummel	50
6	(Luxembourg) Steve Jans	50

==== Gentlemen Trophy ====
Pos	Driver	Points
1	(France) Jean-Luc Blanchemain	112
1	(France) Jean-Luc Beaubelique	112
1	(France) Patrice Goueslard	112
2	(Italy) Leonardo Gorini	60
3	(Italy) Beniamino Caccia	56
4	(France) Romain Brandela	52
5	(France) Bruce Lorgère-Roux	51
6	(Belgium) Fred Bouvy	49
