= 2013 Blancpain Endurance Series Silverstone round =

Map of the Silverstone Grand Prix Circuit

Round 2 of the 2013 Blancpain Endurance Series season took place at Silverstone Circuit on 2 June 2013. A field of 57 GT3 cars competed in the 3-hour endurance race. The race was won by the Aston Martin V12 Vantage GT3 of Aston Martin Racing, driven by Darren Turner, Fred Makowiecki and Stefan Mucke.

== Official results ==
Class winners in bold. Cars failing to complete 70% of winner's distance marked as Not Classified (NC).

| Pos | Class | No | Team | Drivers | Chassis | Tyre | Laps |
| Pos | Class | No | Team | Drivers | Engine | Tyre | Laps |
|---|---|---|---|---|---|---|---|
| 1 | **Pro Cup** | **97** | **(United Kingdom) Aston Martin Racing** | **(United Kingdom) Darren Turner (France) Fred Makowiecki (Germany) Stefan Mücke** | **Aston Martin V12 Vantage GT3** | P | **86** |
| 1 | **Pro Cup** | **97** | **(United Kingdom) Aston Martin Racing** | **(United Kingdom) Darren Turner (France) Fred Makowiecki (Germany) Stefan Mücke** | **Aston Martin 6.0 L V12** | P | **86** |
| 2 | Pro Cup | 1 | (Belgium) Belgian Audi Club Team WRT | (Monaco) Stephane Ortelli (Belgium) Laurens Vanthoor (Germany) Rene Rast | Audi R8 LMS Ultra | P | 86 |
| 2 | Pro Cup | 1 | (Belgium) Belgian Audi Club Team WRT | (Monaco) Stephane Ortelli (Belgium) Laurens Vanthoor (Germany) Rene Rast | Audi 5.2 L V10 | P | 86 |
| 3 | Pro Cup | 13 | (Belgium) Belgian Audi Club Team WRT | (Germany) Frank Stippler (Sweden) Edward Sandström (Germany) Christopher Mies | Audi R8 LMS Ultra | P | 86 |
| 3 | Pro Cup | 13 | (Belgium) Belgian Audi Club Team WRT | (Germany) Frank Stippler (Sweden) Edward Sandström (Germany) Christopher Mies | Audi 5.2 L V10 | P | 86 |
| 4 | Pro Cup | 23 | (United Kingdom) JRM Racing | (Germany) Lucas Luhr (United Kingdom) Peter Dumbreck (United Kingdom) Steven Kane | Nissan GT-R Nismo GT3 | P | 86 |
| 4 | Pro Cup | 23 | (United Kingdom) JRM Racing | (Germany) Lucas Luhr (United Kingdom) Peter Dumbreck (United Kingdom) Steven Kane | Nissan 3.8 L Turbo V6 | P | 86 |
| 5 | Pro Cup | 4 | (Belgium) Marc VDS Racing Team | (Finland) Markus Palttala (Netherlands) Nick Catsburg (Switzerland) Henri Moser | BMW Z4 GT3 | P | 86 |
| 5 | Pro Cup | 4 | (Belgium) Marc VDS Racing Team | (Finland) Markus Palttala (Netherlands) Nick Catsburg (Switzerland) Henri Moser | BMW 4.4 L V8 | P | 86 |
| 6 | Pro Cup | 44 | (Switzerland) Kessel Racing | (Italy) Davide Rigon (Brazil) Cesar Ramos (Italy) Daniel Zampieri | Ferrari 458 Italia GT3 | P | 86 |
| 6 | Pro Cup | 44 | (Switzerland) Kessel Racing | (Italy) Davide Rigon (Brazil) Cesar Ramos (Italy) Daniel Zampieri | Ferrari 4.5 L V8 | P | 86 |
| 7 | Pro Cup | 7 | (France) Hexis Racing | (Netherlands) Stef Dusseldorp (United Kingdom) Alexander Sims (Portugal) Alvaro Parente | McLaren MP4-12C GT3 | P | 86 |
| 7 | Pro Cup | 7 | (France) Hexis Racing | (Netherlands) Stef Dusseldorp (United Kingdom) Alexander Sims (Portugal) Alvaro Parente | McLaren 3.8 L Turbo V8 | P | 86 |
| 8 | Pro Cup | 2 | (Belgium) Belgian Audi Club Team WRT | (Switzerland) Rahel Frey (New Zealand) Matt Halliday (Austria) Nikolaus Mayr-Melnhof | Audi R8 LMS Ultra | P | 86 |
| 8 | Pro Cup | 2 | (Belgium) Belgian Audi Club Team WRT | (Switzerland) Rahel Frey (New Zealand) Matt Halliday (Austria) Nikolaus Mayr-Melnhof | Audi 5.2 L V10 | P | 86 |
| 9 | Pro Cup | 16 | (Germany) Phoenix Racing | (Germany) Markus Winkelhock (Belgium) Enzo Ide (Belgium) Anthony Kumpen | Audi R8 LMS Ultra | P | 86 |
| 9 | Pro Cup | 16 | (Germany) Phoenix Racing | (Germany) Markus Winkelhock (Belgium) Enzo Ide (Belgium) Anthony Kumpen | Audi 5.2 L V10 | P | 86 |
| 10 | **Pro-Am Cup** | **35** | **(United Kingdom) Nissan GT Academy Team RJN** | **(Spain) Lucas Ordonez (Germany) Peter Pyzera (United Kingdom) Alex Buncombe** | **Nissan GT-R Nismo GT3** | P | **86** |
| 10 | **Pro-Am Cup** | **35** | **(United Kingdom) Nissan GT Academy Team RJN** | **(Spain) Lucas Ordonez (Germany) Peter Pyzera (United Kingdom) Alex Buncombe** | **Nissan 3.8 L Turbo V6** | P | **86** |
| 11 | Pro Cup | 69 | (United Kingdom) Gulf Racing UK | (United Kingdom) Rob Bell (United Kingdom) Adam Carroll (Belgium) Nico Verdonck | McLaren MP4-12C GT3 | P | 85 |
| 11 | Pro Cup | 69 | (United Kingdom) Gulf Racing UK | (United Kingdom) Rob Bell (United Kingdom) Adam Carroll (Belgium) Nico Verdonck | McLaren 3.8 L Turbo V8 | P | 85 |
| 12 | Pro Cup | 6 | (Germany) Phoenix Racing | (United Kingdom) Oliver Jarvis (Germany) Christopher Haase (Switzerland) Harold Primat | Audi R8 LMS Ultra | P | 85 |
| 12 | Pro Cup | 6 | (Germany) Phoenix Racing | (United Kingdom) Oliver Jarvis (Germany) Christopher Haase (Switzerland) Harold Primat | Audi 5.2 L V10 | P | 85 |
| 13 | Pro-Am Cup | 180 | (United Kingdom) Barwell Motorsport | (United Kingdom) Joe Osborne (United Kingdom) Richard Abra (United Kingdom) Mark Poole | Aston Martin V12 Vantage GT3 | P | 85 |
| 13 | Pro-Am Cup | 180 | (United Kingdom) Barwell Motorsport | (United Kingdom) Joe Osborne (United Kingdom) Richard Abra (United Kingdom) Mark Poole | Aston Martin 6.0 L V12 | P | 85 |
| 14 | Pro-Am Cup | 25 | (France) TDS Racing | (France) Henry Hassid (France) Ludovic Badey | BMW Z4 GT3 | P | 85 |
| 14 | Pro-Am Cup | 25 | (France) TDS Racing | (France) Henry Hassid (France) Ludovic Badey | BMW 4.4 L V8 | P | 85 |
| 15 | Pro-Am Cup | 78 | (Austria) GRT Grasser-Racing Team | (Austria) Hari Proczyk (Austria) Gerhard Tweraser (Austria) Gottfried Grasser | Lamborghini LP 560-4 | P | 85 |
| 15 | Pro-Am Cup | 78 | (Austria) GRT Grasser-Racing Team | (Austria) Hari Proczyk (Austria) Gerhard Tweraser (Austria) Gottfried Grasser | Lamborghini 5.2 L V10 | P | 85 |
| 16 | Pro Cup | 62 | (United Kingdom) Fortec Motorsport | (United Kingdom) Benji Hetherington (United Kingdom) Ollie Hancock (United Kingdom) Stephen Jelley | Mercedes-Benz SLS AMG GT3 | P | 85 |
| 16 | Pro Cup | 62 | (United Kingdom) Fortec Motorsport | (United Kingdom) Benji Hetherington (United Kingdom) Ollie Hancock (United Kingdom) Stephen Jelley | Mercedes-Benz 6.2 L V8 | P | 85 |
| 17 | Pro Cup | 71 | (Russia) SMP Racing | (Russia) Victor Shaitar (Russia) Devi Markozov (Finland) Mika Salo | Ferrari 458 Italia GT3 | P | 85 |
| 17 | Pro Cup | 71 | (Russia) SMP Racing | (Russia) Victor Shaitar (Russia) Devi Markozov (Finland) Mika Salo | Ferrari 4.5 L V8 | P | 85 |
| 18 | Pro Cup | 75 | (Belgium) Prospeed Competition | (Belgium) Maxime Soulet (Netherlands) Xavier Maassen (Germany) Marc Hennerici | Porsche 997 GT3 R | P | 85 |
| 18 | Pro Cup | 75 | (Belgium) Prospeed Competition | (Belgium) Maxime Soulet (Netherlands) Xavier Maassen (Germany) Marc Hennerici | Porsche 4.0 L Flat-6 | P | 85 |
| 19 | Pro-Am Cup | 230 | (United Kingdom) JRM Racing | (United Arab Emirates) Humaid Al Masaood (United Kingdom) Charles Bateman (United Kingdom) Matt Bell | Nissan GT-R Nismo GT3 | P | 84 |
| 19 | Pro-Am Cup | 230 | (United Kingdom) JRM Racing | (United Arab Emirates) Humaid Al Masaood (United Kingdom) Charles Bateman (United Kingdom) Matt Bell | Nissan 3.8 L Turbo V6 | P | 84 |
| 20 | Pro-Am Cup | 50 | (Italy) AF Corse | (Netherlands) Niek Hommerson (Belgium) Louis Machiels (Italy) Andrea Bertolini | Ferrari 458 Italia GT3 | P | 84 |
| 20 | Pro-Am Cup | 50 | (Italy) AF Corse | (Netherlands) Niek Hommerson (Belgium) Louis Machiels (Italy) Andrea Bertolini | Ferrari 4.5 L V8 | P | 84 |
| 21 | Pro-Am Cup | 123 | Team Ukraine | (Ukraine) Ruslan Tsyplakov (Ukraine) Andrii Kruglyk (Italy) Raffaele Gianmaria | Ferrari 458 Italia GT3 | P | 84 |
| 21 | Pro-Am Cup | 123 | Team Ukraine | (Ukraine) Ruslan Tsyplakov (Ukraine) Andrii Kruglyk (Italy) Raffaele Gianmaria | Ferrari 4.5 L V8 | P | 84 |
| 22 | Pro-Am Cup | 43 | (Italy) ROAL Motorsport | (Italy) Michela Cerruti (Italy) Stefano Comandini (Italy) Thomas Biagi | BMW Z4 GT3 | P | 84 |
| 22 | Pro-Am Cup | 43 | (Italy) ROAL Motorsport | (Italy) Michela Cerruti (Italy) Stefano Comandini (Italy) Thomas Biagi | BMW 4.4 L V8 | P | 84 |
| 23 | Pro-Am Cup | 19 | (Germany) Black Falcon | (Ukraine) Andrii Lebed (United Kingdom) Oliver Morley (United Kingdom) Duncan Tappy | Mercedes-Benz SLS AMG GT3 | P | 84 |
| 23 | Pro-Am Cup | 19 | (Germany) Black Falcon | (Ukraine) Andrii Lebed (United Kingdom) Oliver Morley (United Kingdom) Duncan Tappy | Mercedes-Benz 6.2 L V8 | P | 84 |
| 24 | Pro Cup | 70 | (Russia) SMP Racing | (Russia) Alexey Basov (Russia) Alexander Skryabin (Italy) Alessandro Pier Guidi | Ferrari 458 Italia GT3 | P | 84 |
| 24 | Pro Cup | 70 | (Russia) SMP Racing | (Russia) Alexey Basov (Russia) Alexander Skryabin (Italy) Alessandro Pier Guidi | Ferrari 4.5 L V8 | P | 84 |
| 25 | **Gentleman; Trophy** | **66** | **(Slovakia) ARC Bratislava** | **(Slovakia) Miro Konôpka (Oman) Ahmad Al Harthy** | **Porsche 997 GT3 R** | P | **84** |
| 25 | **Gentleman; Trophy** | **66** | **(Slovakia) ARC Bratislava** | **(Slovakia) Miro Konôpka (Oman) Ahmad Al Harthy** | **Porsche 4.0 L Flat-6** | P | **84** |
| 26 | Pro-Am Cup | 88 | (New Zealand) Von Ryan Racing | (South Africa) Jordan Grogor (South Africa) Leon Price (United Kingdom) Rob Barff | McLaren MP4-12C GT3 | P | 84 |
| 26 | Pro-Am Cup | 88 | (New Zealand) Von Ryan Racing | (South Africa) Jordan Grogor (South Africa) Leon Price (United Kingdom) Rob Barff | McLaren 3.8 L Turbo V8 | P | 84 |
