= 2013 Blancpain Endurance Series Monza round =

Layout of the Autodromo Nazionale Monza

Round 1 of the 2013 Blancpain Endurance Series season took place at Monza, Italy, on 14 April 2013. A field of 60 GT3 cars competed in the 3-hour endurance race. The race was won by the Ferrari 458 Italia GT3 of Kessel Racing, driven by Daniel Zampieri, César Ramos, and Davide Rigon.

== Official results ==
Class winners in bold. Cars failing to complete 70% of winner's distance marked as not classified (NC).

Pos	Class	No	Team	Drivers	Chassis	Tyre	Laps
Pos	Class	No	Team	Drivers	Engine	Tyre	Laps
1	**PRO**	**44**	**(Switzerland) Kessel Racing**	**(Italy) Daniel Zampieri (Brazil) César Ramos (Italy) Davide Rigon**	**Ferrari 458 Italia GT3**		**94**
2	PRO	11	(France) ART Grand Prix	(France) Antoine Leclerc (Spain) Andy Soucek (France) Mike Parisy	McLaren MP4-12C GT3		94
3	PRO	69	(United Kingdom) Gulf Racing	(United Kingdom) Rob Bell (United Kingdom) Adam Carroll (Belgium) Nico Verdonck	McLaren MP4-12C GT3		94
4	PRO	13	(Belgium) Belgian Audi Club Team WRT	(Sweden) Edward Sandström (Germany) Frank Stippler (Germany) Christoper Mies	Audi R8 LMS ultra		94
5	**PAM**	**50**	**(Italy) AF Corse**	**(Netherlands) Niek Hommerson (Belgium) Louis Machiels (Italy) Andrea Bertolini**	**Ferrari 458 Italia GT3**		**94**
6	PRO	16	(Germany) Phoenix Racing	(Belgium) Enzo Ide (Belgium) Anthony Kumpen (Germany) Markus Winkelhock	Audi R8 LMS ultra		94
7	PAM	25	(France) Thiriet by TDS Racing	(France) Henry Hassid (France) Ludovic Badey	BMW Z4 GT3		94
8	PRO	6	(Germany) Phoenix Racing	(United Kingdom) Oliver Jarvis (Germany) Christopher Haase (Switzerland) Harold Primat	Audi R8 LMS ultra		94
9	PAM	18	(Germany) Black Falcon	(Netherlands) Klaas Hummel (Luxembourg) Steve Jans (United Kingdom) Adam Christodoulou	Mercedes SLS AMG GT3		94
10	PRO	3	(Belgium) Marc VDS Racing Team	(Belgium) Bas Leinders (Belgium) Maxime Martin (Netherlands) Yelmer Buurman	BMW Z4 GT3		94
19	**GTR**	**20**	**(France) SOFREV Auto Sport Promotion**	**(France) Jean-Luc Beaubélique (France) Jean-Luc Blanchemain (France) Patrice Goueslard**	**Ferrari 458 Italia GT3**		**93**
