= Rodin Younessi =

American racing driver

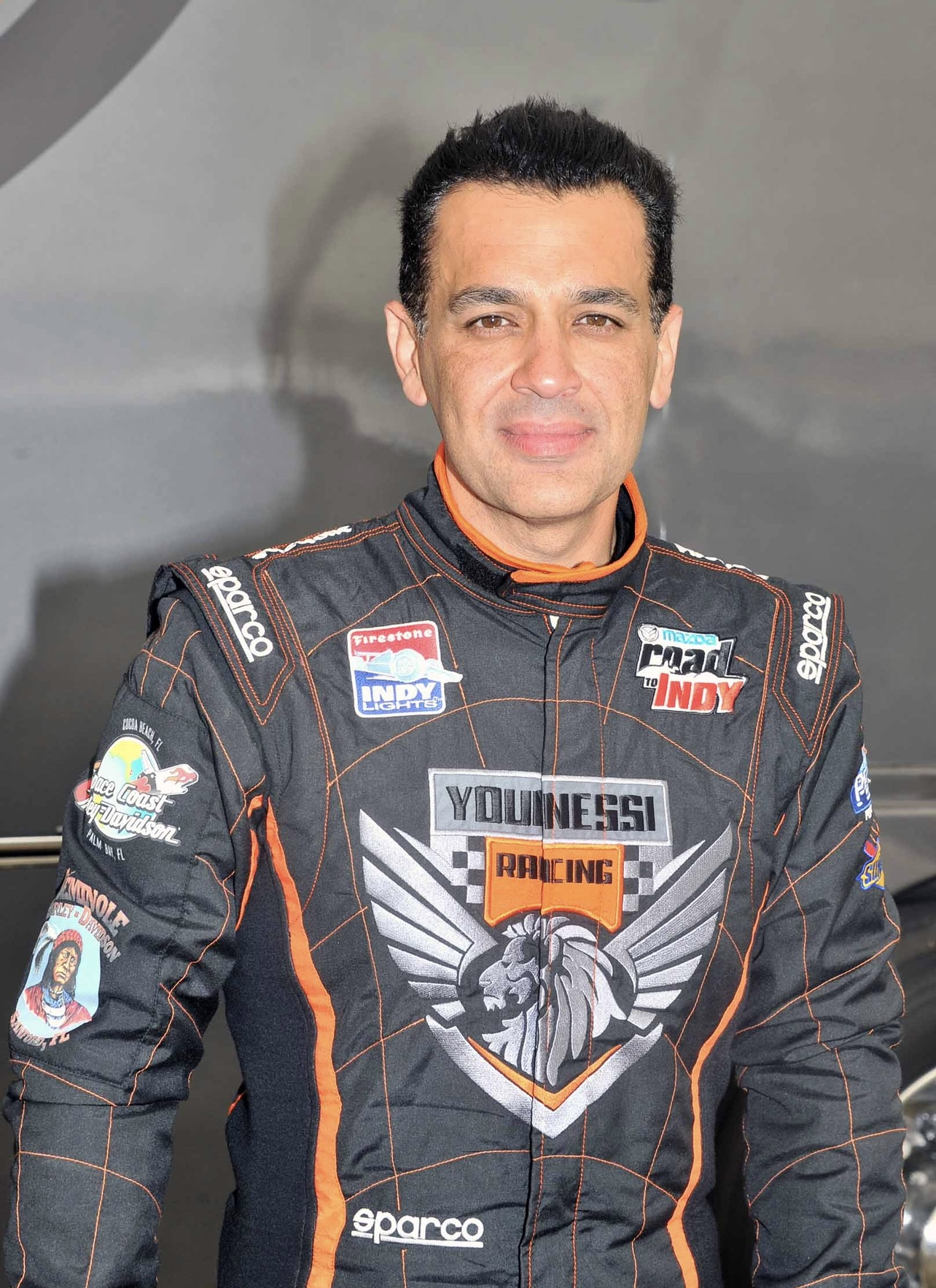
- Younessi during the 2012 Indianapolis 500 weekend
- Nationality: (United States) American
- Born: August 1, 1969 (age 57) Palm Beach, Florida, United States

Blancpain Endurance Series & 24 Hours of Le Mans career
- Current team: Younessi Racing / Molitor Racing Systems / Boutsen Ginion
- Categorisation: FIA Silver (until 2013, 2024–); FIA Bronze (2014–2019)

Previous series
- 2012 2011 2011: Firestone Indy Lights; U.S. F2000 National Championship; F2000 Championship Series

Rodin Younessi (born August 1, 1969 in Palm Beach, Florida) is an American racing driver from Palm Beach, Florida.

== Racing career ==
Younessi began racing motorcycles at a young age and also competed in sports car racing. In 2011, he competed in the U.S. F2000 National Championship for Pabst Racing Services and JDC Motorsports in the series' National Class. He made seven starts finishing the season fourth in championship standing in the National Class with a best finish of twelfth overall in race 2 at Road America. In 2011, he also competed in the pair of F2000 Championship Series races at the Mid-Ohio Sports Car Course. In 2012, Younessi formed his own team to compete in the Firestone Indy Lights series and announced that he would compete in the full season. However, Younessi ultimately only made two race starts, at the season opener in St. Petersburg and in June in Detroit. He finished 21st in points. He also competed in Baltimore driving a Le Mans Prototype Challenge Car in the American Le Mans Series.

In 2013, Younessi competedin the Blancpain Endurance Series in a McLaren MP4-12C. In the first race of the season in Monza, Younessi set the fastest lap time in the second qualifying in a field of sixty cars. In May 2013, it was announced that Younessi would compete in the 2013 24 Hours of Le Mans. His team's Nissan powered Oreca 03 finished in 32nd place, eleventh in the LMP2 class.

== Personal ==
Younessi began his professional career in the software industry after receiving degrees in Computer Science and Electrical Engineering. He continued his education by attending law school. After receiving his Juris Doctor he was admitted as a member of the Florida and Federal Bar. In 2006, Younessi was knighted and received the title of Chevalier by the Order of St. John of Jerusalem, Knights Hospitaller for his various charitable activities and contributions. Pursuing his passion for MotorSports he switched professions by owning and operating motorsports dealerships, including some of the highest volume Harley-Davidson dealerships in America, San Diego Harley-Davidson, Los Angeles Harley-Davidson, Top Rocker Harley-Davidson, Seminole Harley-Davidson, Falcons Fury Harley-Davidson, Raging Bull Harley-Davidson, Miracle City Harley-Davidson, Mulholland Harley-Davidson, Treasure Coast Harley-Davidson, and Space Coast Harley-Davidson. He also owns a Lamborghini dealership in Palm Beach.

Younessi has one child a son named Dariyan Rodin Younessi who started his racing career at the age of four with Karting.

== Racing record ==
=== Complete U.S. F2000 National Championship results ===
(key)

=== American open–wheel racing results ===
(key)

==== Indy Lights ====
Year	Team	1	2	3	4	5	6	7	8	9	10	11	12	Rank	Points
2012	Younessi Racing	STP; 16	ALA	LBH	INDY	DET; 12	MIL	IOW	TOR	EDM	TRO	BAL	FON	21st	32

=== Complete American Le Mans Series results ===
Year	Entrant	Class	Chassis	Engine	Tyres	1	2	3	4	5	6	7	8	9	10	Rank	Points
2012	Performance Tech Motorsports	PC	Oreca FLM09	Chevrolet LS3 6.2 L V8	M	SEB	LNB	MON	LIM	MOS	MID	AME	BAL ovr:Ret cls:Ret	VIR	PET	NC*	0*

=== 24 Hours of Le Mans ===
Year	Team	Co-Drivers	Car	Class	Laps	Pos.	Class Pos.
2013	(Belgium) Boutsen Ginion Racing	(France) Thomas Dagoneau (United States) Matt Downs	Oreca 03-Nissan	LMP2	300	32nd	11th
