= 2012 Baltimore Sports Car Challenge =

Multi-class sports car and GT motor race

Track map of Baltimore Street Circuit (2012-2013)

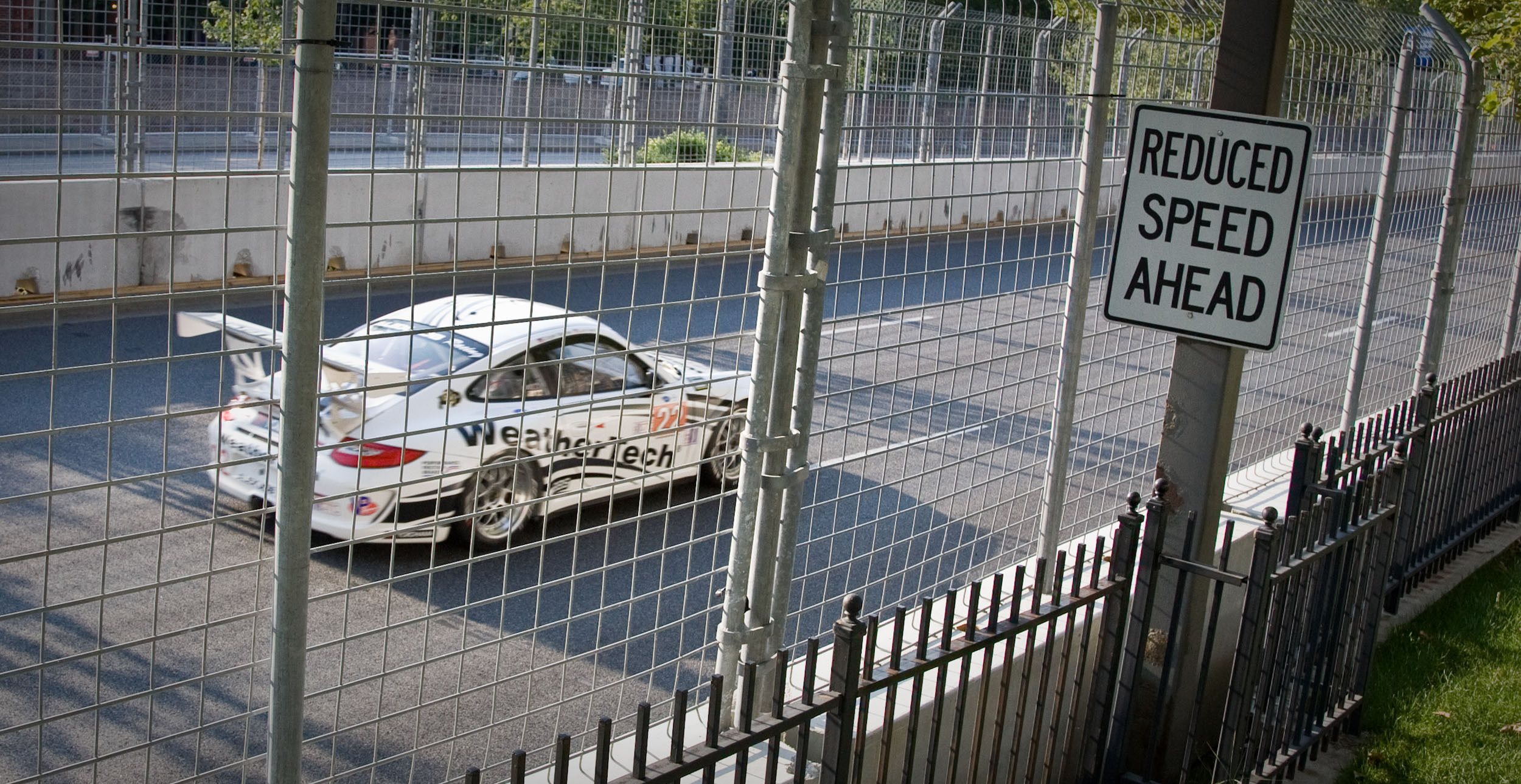
Porsche GT3 race cars (GT Challenge class) of the American Le Mans Series (ALMS) motorsport challenge practice for their race, during the Baltimore Grand Prix, on the streets of downtown Baltimore on Friday, August 31, 2012

The 2012 Baltimore Sports Car Challenge presented by SRT was a multi-class sports car and GT motor race held on the streets of Baltimore in Maryland, United States on September 1, 2012. It was the eighth round of the 2012 American Le Mans Series season and the second race Baltimore Sports Car Challenge, and event co-located with the Grand Prix of Baltimore IndyCar race. The race was held over a two-hour time period, during which 67 laps of the 3.3 kilometre circuit were completed for a race distance of 218 kilometres.

The race was won by Level 5 Motorsports duo of Scott Tucker and Christophe Bouchut driving a HPD ARX-03b. The race was dominated by the P2 class cars as trouble struck all three P1 class prototypes. When Conquest Endurance broke a gearbox in their Morgan LMP2 it set up the first outright victory by a P2 prototype since Andretti Green Racing's Franck Montagny and James Rossiter took victory at the 2008 Detroit Sports Car Challenge, also driving a HPD ARX. Second place was also a Level 5 Motorsports HPD ARX-03b, driven by Tucker, Luis Díaz and Ricardo González.

Third was the first of the Prototype Challenge Oreca FLM09s, the CORE Autosport car of Alex Popow and Ryan Dalziel.

Even more notable the Level 5 Motorsports' 1–2 victory, the Team Falken Tire Porsche of Wolf Henzler and Bryan Sellers finished fourth, winning the GT class, finishing on the same lap as the Level 5 HPDs. They finished ahead of the factory Chevrolet Corvette of Oliver Gavin and Tommy Milner, the Extreme Speed Motorsports Ferrari of Scott Sharp and Johannes van Overbeek, the BMW Team RLL BMW of Joey Hand and Dirk Müller, the Flying Lizard Motorsports Porsche of Jörg Bergmeister and Patrick Long and the second Corvette of Jan Magnussen and Antonio García as GTs dominated the top ten finishers.

Thirteenth was the P1 class survivor, the Dyson Racing Team Lola B11/66 of Michael Marsal and Eric Lux.

GT Challenge was claimed when the TRG Porsche of Patrick Pilet and debutant Al Carter crossed the line in 19th position.

24 of the 30 entries were running at races conclusion.

== Race ==
=== Race result ===
Class winners in bold. Cars failing to complete 70% of their class winner's distance are marked as Not Classified (NC).

Pos	Class	No	Team	Drivers	Chassis	Tire	Laps
Pos	Class	No	Team	Drivers	Engine	Tire	Laps
1	**P2**	**055**	**(United States) Level 5 Motorsports**	**(United States) Scott Tucker (France) Christophe Bouchut**	**HPD ARX-03b**	D	**67**
1	**P2**	**055**	**(United States) Level 5 Motorsports**	**(United States) Scott Tucker (France) Christophe Bouchut**	**Honda HR28TT 2.8 L Turbo V6**	D	**67**
2	P2	95	(United States) Level 5 Motorsports	(United States) Scott Tucker (Mexico) Luis Díaz (Mexico) Ricardo González	HPD ARX-03b	D	67
2	P2	95	(United States) Level 5 Motorsports	(United States) Scott Tucker (Mexico) Luis Díaz (Mexico) Ricardo González	Honda HR28TT 2.8 L Turbo V6	D	67
3	**PC**	**06**	**(United States) CORE Autosport**	**(Venezuela) Alex Popow (United Kingdom) Ryan Dalziel**	**Oreca FLM09**	MI	**67**
3	**PC**	**06**	**(United States) CORE Autosport**	**(Venezuela) Alex Popow (United Kingdom) Ryan Dalziel**	**Chevrolet LS3 6.2 L V8**	MI	**67**
4	**GT**	**17**	**(United States) Team Falken Tire**	**(Germany) Wolf Henzler (United States) Bryan Sellers**	**Porsche 997 GT3-RSR**	FAL	**67**
4	**GT**	**17**	**(United States) Team Falken Tire**	**(Germany) Wolf Henzler (United States) Bryan Sellers**	**Porsche 4.0 L Flat-6**	FAL	**67**
5	GT	4	(United States) Corvette Racing	(United Kingdom) Oliver Gavin (United States) Tommy Milner	Chevrolet Corvette C6.R	MI	67
5	GT	4	(United States) Corvette Racing	(United Kingdom) Oliver Gavin (United States) Tommy Milner	Chevrolet 5.5 L V8	MI	67
6	GT	01	(United States) Extreme Speed Motorsports	(United States) Scott Sharp (United States) Johannes van Overbeek	Ferrari 458 Italia GT2	MI	67
6	GT	01	(United States) Extreme Speed Motorsports	(United States) Scott Sharp (United States) Johannes van Overbeek	Ferrari 4.5 L V8	MI	67
7	GT	56	(United States) BMW Team RLL	(United States) Joey Hand (Germany) Dirk Müller	BMW M3 GT2	D	67
7	GT	56	(United States) BMW Team RLL	(United States) Joey Hand (Germany) Dirk Müller	BMW 4.0 L V8	D	67
8	GT	45	(United States) Flying Lizard Motorsports	(Germany) Jörg Bergmeister (United States) Patrick Long	Porsche 997 GT3-RSR	MI	67
8	GT	45	(United States) Flying Lizard Motorsports	(Germany) Jörg Bergmeister (United States) Patrick Long	Porsche 4.0 L Flat-6	MI	67
9	GT	3	(United States) Corvette Racing	(Denmark) Jan Magnussen (Spain) Antonio García	Chevrolet Corvette C6.R	MI	67
9	GT	3	(United States) Corvette Racing	(Denmark) Jan Magnussen (Spain) Antonio García	Chevrolet 5.5 L V8	MI	67
10	PC	9	(United States) RSR Racing	(Brazil) Bruno Junqueira (United States) Tomy Drissi	Oreca FLM09	MI	67
10	PC	9	(United States) RSR Racing	(Brazil) Bruno Junqueira (United States) Tomy Drissi	Chevrolet LS3 6.2 L V8	MI	67
11	GT	44	(United States) Flying Lizard Motorsports	(United States) Seth Neiman (Germany) Marco Holzer (United States) Patrick Long	Porsche 997 GT3-RSR	MI	67
11	GT	44	(United States) Flying Lizard Motorsports	(United States) Seth Neiman (Germany) Marco Holzer (United States) Patrick Long	Porsche 4.0 L Flat-6	MI	67
12	GT	55	(United States) BMW Team RLL	(Germany) Jörg Müller (United States) Bill Auberlen	BMW M3 GT2	D	67
12	GT	55	(United States) BMW Team RLL	(Germany) Jörg Müller (United States) Bill Auberlen	BMW 4.0 L V8	D	67
13	**P1**	**20**	**(United States) Dyson Racing Team**	**(United States) Michael Marsal (United States) Eric Lux**	**Lola B11/66**	D	**67**
13	**P1**	**20**	**(United States) Dyson Racing Team**	**(United States) Michael Marsal (United States) Eric Lux**	**Mazda MZR-R 2.0 L Turbo I4 (Isobutanol)**	D	**67**
14	GT	48	(United States) Paul Miller Racing	(United States) Bryce Miller (Germany) Sascha Maassen	Porsche 997 GT3-RSR	D	66
14	GT	48	(United States) Paul Miller Racing	(United States) Bryce Miller (Germany) Sascha Maassen	Porsche 4.0 L Flat-6	D	66
15	GT	23	(United States) Lotus / Alex Job Racing	(United States) Bill Sweedler (United States) Townsend Bell	Lotus Evora GTE	Y	66
15	GT	23	(United States) Lotus / Alex Job Racing	(United States) Bill Sweedler (United States) Townsend Bell	Toyota-Cosworth 3.5 L V6	Y	66
16	PC	25	(United States) Dempsey Racing	(France) Henri Richard (United States) Duncan Ende	Oreca FLM09	MI	66
16	PC	25	(United States) Dempsey Racing	(France) Henri Richard (United States) Duncan Ende	Chevrolet LS3 6.2 L V8	MI	66
17	GT	02	(United States) Extreme Speed Motorsports	(United States) Ed Brown (United States) Guy Cosmo	Ferrari 458 Italia GT2	MI	66
17	GT	02	(United States) Extreme Speed Motorsports	(United States) Ed Brown (United States) Guy Cosmo	Ferrari 4.5 L V8	MI	66
18 DNF	GT	93	(United States) SRT Motorsports	(Belgium) Marc Goossens (United States) Tommy Kendall	SRT Viper GTS-R	MI	65
18 DNF	GT	93	(United States) SRT Motorsports	(Belgium) Marc Goossens (United States) Tommy Kendall	Dodge 8.0 L V10	MI	65
19	**GTC**	**68**	**(United States) TRG**	**(United States) Al Carter (France) Patrick Pilet**	**Porsche 997 GT3 Cup**	Y	**65**
19	**GTC**	**68**	**(United States) TRG**	**(United States) Al Carter (France) Patrick Pilet**	**Porsche 4.0 L Flat-6**	Y	**65**
20	GTC	22	(United States) Alex Job Racing	(United States) Cooper MacNeil (United States) Leh Keen	Porsche 997 GT3 Cup	Y	65
20	GTC	22	(United States) Alex Job Racing	(United States) Cooper MacNeil (United States) Leh Keen	Porsche 4.0 L Flat-6	Y	65
21	GTC	34	(United States) Green Hornet Racing	(United States) Peter LeSaffre (Republic of Ireland) Damien Faulkner	Porsche 997 GT3 Cup	Y	65
21	GTC	34	(United States) Green Hornet Racing	(United States) Peter LeSaffre (Republic of Ireland) Damien Faulkner	Porsche 4.0 L Flat-6	Y	65
22	GTC	66	(United States) TRG	(United States) Marc Bunting (United States) Spencer Pumpelly	Porsche 997 GT3 Cup	Y	65
22	GTC	66	(United States) TRG	(United States) Marc Bunting (United States) Spencer Pumpelly	Porsche 4.0 L Flat-6	Y	65
23	P1	16	(United States) Dyson Racing Team	(United States) Chris Dyson (United Kingdom) Guy Smith	Lola B12/60	D	65
23	P1	16	(United States) Dyson Racing Team	(United States) Chris Dyson (United Kingdom) Guy Smith	Mazda MZR-R 2.0 L Turbo I4 (Isobutanol)	D	65
24 DNF	P1	6	(United States) Muscle Milk Pickett Racing	(Germany) Lucas Luhr (Germany) Klaus Graf	HPD ARX-03a	MI	62
24 DNF	P1	6	(United States) Muscle Milk Pickett Racing	(Germany) Lucas Luhr (Germany) Klaus Graf	Honda 3.4 L V8	MI	62
25	PC	7	(United States) Merchant Services Racing	(United States) Lucas Downs (United States) Matt Downs	Oreca FLM09	MI	58
25	PC	7	(United States) Merchant Services Racing	(United States) Lucas Downs (United States) Matt Downs	Chevrolet LS3 6.2 L V8	MI	58
26 DNF	P2	37	(United States) Conquest Endurance	(United Kingdom) Martin Plowman (Denmark) David Heinemeier Hansson	Morgan LMP2	D	56
26 DNF	P2	37	(United States) Conquest Endurance	(United Kingdom) Martin Plowman (Denmark) David Heinemeier Hansson	Nissan VK45DE 4.5 L V8	D	56
27	GTC	11	(United States) JDX Racing	(Canada) Chris Cumming (Canada) Michael Valiante	Porsche 997 GT3 Cup	Y	49
27	GTC	11	(United States) JDX Racing	(Canada) Chris Cumming (Canada) Michael Valiante	Porsche 4.0 L Flat-6	Y	49
28 DNF	PC	8	(United States) Merchant Services Racing	(Canada) Kyle Marcelli (Canada) Tony Burgess	Oreca FLM09	MI	43
28 DNF	PC	8	(United States) Merchant Services Racing	(Canada) Kyle Marcelli (Canada) Tony Burgess	Chevrolet LS3 6.2 L V8	MI	43
29 DNF	PC	05	(United States) CORE Autosport	(United States) Jon Bennett (United States) Colin Braun	Oreca FLM09	MI	31
29 DNF	PC	05	(United States) CORE Autosport	(United States) Jon Bennett (United States) Colin Braun	Chevrolet LS3 6.2 L V8	MI	31
30 DNF	PC	18	(United States) Performance Tech Motorsports	(Brazil) Raphael Matos (United States) Rodin Younessi	Oreca FLM09	MI	0
30 DNF	PC	18	(United States) Performance Tech Motorsports	(Brazil) Raphael Matos (United States) Rodin Younessi	Chevrolet LS3 6.2 L V8	MI	0

American Le Mans Series
Previous race: Road Race Showcase	2012 season	Next race: American Le Mans Series VIR 240
