= Younessi Racing =

(United States) Younessi Racing
- Founded: 2011
- Team principal(s): Rodin Younessi
- Current series: Firestone Indy Lights
- Former series: U.S. F2000 National Championship
- Noted drivers: Rodin Younessi, Peter Dempsey

Younessi Racing is an American auto racing team that competed in the Firestone Indy Lights series. The team is owned by Rodin Younessi and its cars were driven by Younessi and Peter Dempsey.

In 2011 the team competed in the U.S. F2000 National Championship National Class in association with JDC Motorsports.

The team made its Indy Lights debut on the Streets of St. Petersburg in 2012.
