= McLaren 12C =

British sports car designed and manufactured by McLaren Automotive

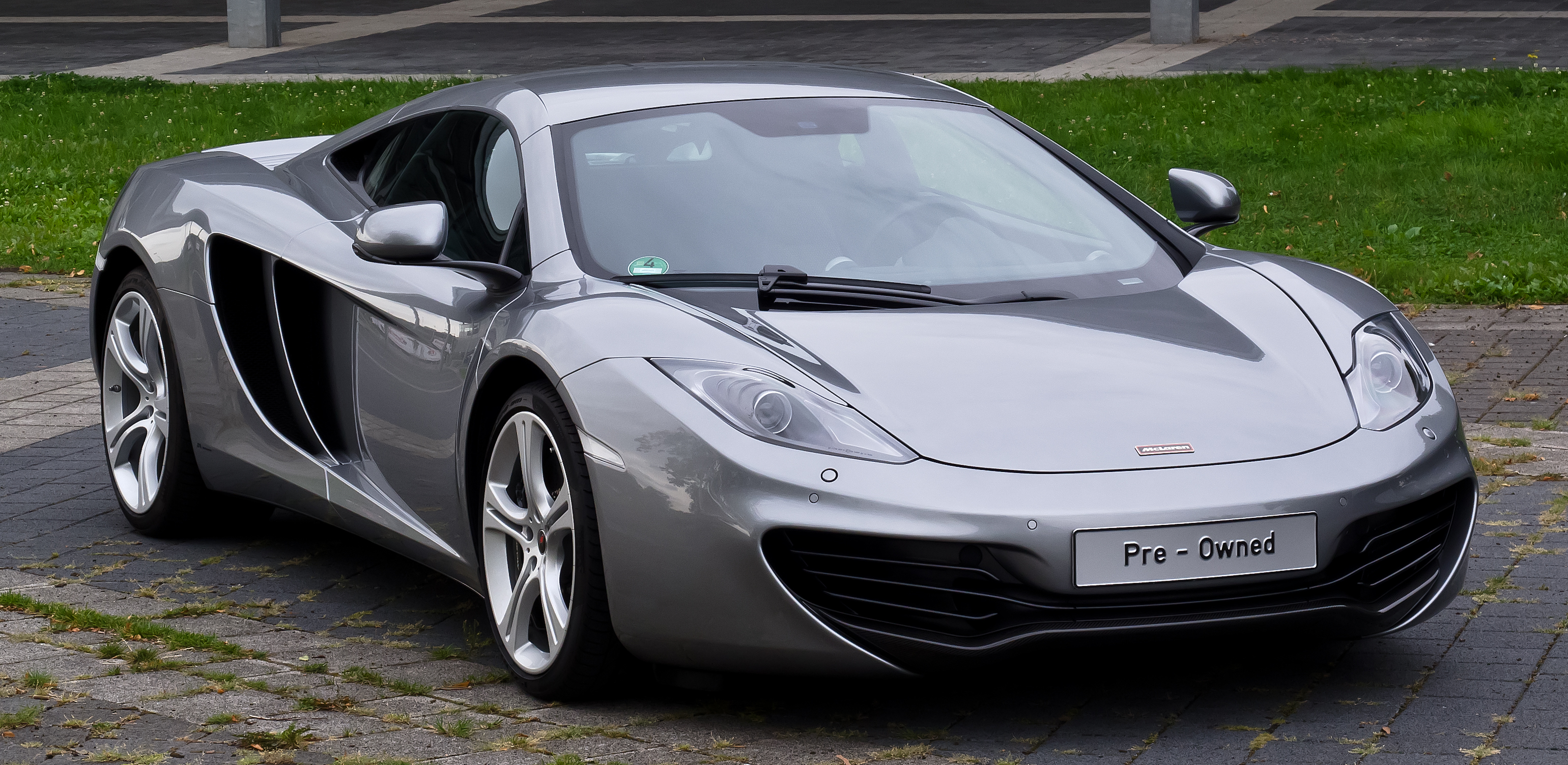

Overview
- Manufacturer: McLaren Automotive
- Production: February 2011 – April 2014
- Assembly: United Kingdom: Woking, Surrey
- Designer: Frank Stephenson

Body and chassis
- Class: Sports car
- Body style: 2-door coupe 2-door retractable hard-top convertible
- Layout: Longitudinal rear mid-engine, rear-wheel drive
- Doors: Dihedral

Powertrain
- Engine: 3.8 L M838T twin-turbocharged V8
- Transmission: 7-speed SSG Graziano dual-clutch

Dimensions
- Wheelbase: 2,670 mm (105.1 in)
- Length: 4,509 mm (177.5 in)
- Width: 1,908 mm (75.1 in)
- Height: 1,204 mm (47.4 in)
- Kerb weight: 1,434 kg (3,161 lb)

Chronology
- Successor: McLaren 650S

The McLaren MP4-12C, later rebranded as the McLaren 12C, is a sports car produced by the British carmaker McLaren Automotive. Manufactured between 2011 and 2014, the MP4-12C was available as both a coupe and a retractable hard-top convertible, the latter known as the "Spider".

The 12C marked McLaren's return to production car sales for the first time since 1998, when the F1 ceased production. Development began in 2005, and the car made its online debut in September 2009 as the MP4-12C. McLaren began series manufacturing the car in February 2011 at the company's facility in Woking, Surrey. The 12C Spider debuted in July 2012.

Production ended in April 2014 with more than 3,400 units manufactured. It was succeeded by the 650S, which shares most of the 12C's components.

The 12C has a carbon fibre composite chassis and a turbocharged V8 engine that generates a power output of 453 kilowatts (607 bhp) and a torque output of 600 newton-metres (440 lbf⋅ft).

== Name ==
The McLaren Formula One team has used the "MP4" prefix as its chassis designation since 1981. This acronym stands for "McLaren Project 4", which originated from the merger of Ron Dennis' organisation, Project Four Racing, with McLaren. The "12" in the name refers to McLaren's internal "Vehicle Performance" index, which evaluates cars based on four key criteria: power, weight, emissions, and aerodynamics. The "C" in the name signifies that the car features a carbon structure. In 2012, McLaren dropped the "MP4" part of its name, simplifying it to "12C".

== Development ==
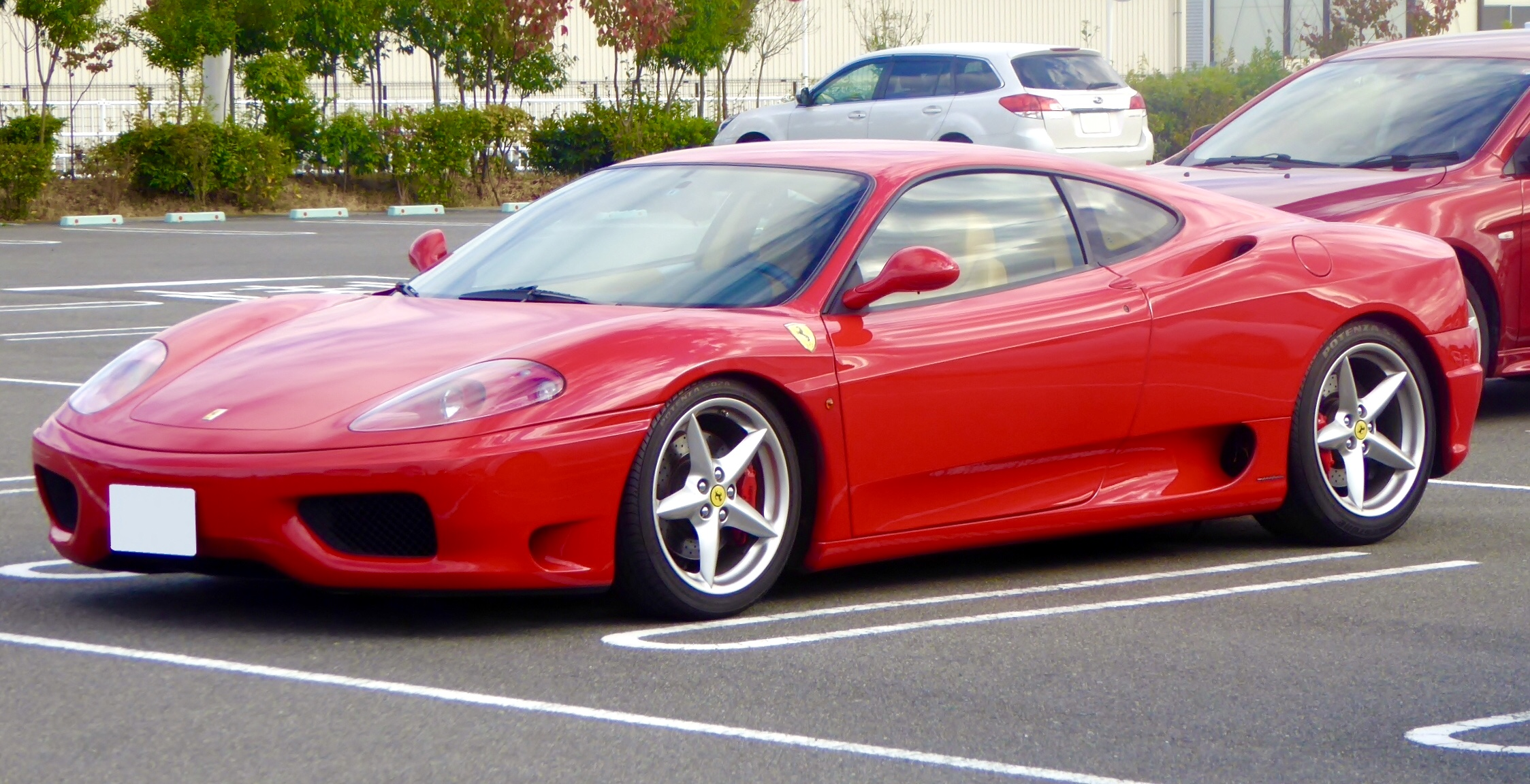
McLaren used two Ferrari 360s as test mules to develop the MP4-12C.

McLaren began developing the 12C in 2005. In June 2007, Autocar magazine reported that McLaren's upcoming sports car would be independently built by the company, stating that it would give the company "a chance to re-establish [its] credentials at the top-end of the market". McLaren had not sold a production car since the F1 ceased production in 1998. To develop the car, McLaren used modified versions of existing vehicles from other manufacturers as test mules. The first prototype, called the MV1, was a Ferrari 360 that featured a 3.8-litre twin-turbocharged V8 engine and side vents for additional cooling, which were eventually incorporated into the final production model. A second prototype, the MV2, was a modified Ultima GTR used to test the braking system and suspension components. A third prototype, the MV3, was another modified Ferrari 360 used to test the exhaust system. McLaren subsequently developed two in-house prototypes, the CP1 and CP2, which featured a "MonoCell" monocoque and were used to test heat management and performance.

McLaren would produce over fifty experimental prototypes and test them in various regions to evaluate their performance in different environments. The testing locations included hot weather conditions in Bahrain, Arizona, and Nevada, cold weather conditions in the Arctic and Sweden, high-altitude conditions in South Africa and endurance testing on various circuits and roads in Europe. The head of testing for the programme, Geoff Grose, noted that the development team established bases at Idiada in northern Spain and the Prototipo facility near Nardo in Italy, where they conducted 24-hour testing sessions as well as 18-hour sessions from 8 am to 2 am the next day.

In 2008, Frank Stephenson was appointed lead design director of McLaren, and he became chief of the project late in its development. Stephenson made some adjustments to the design of its headlights, front bumper, and interior elements. His contributions were mainly small alterations, as the overall design of the car was already well-established at that point. The final design of the MP4-12C was unveiled online in September 2009, with its physical debut occurring at the Goodwood Festival of Speed in July 2010. Following McLaren's investment of £50 million into its production facility at Woking, Surrey, which could build approximately 4,000 cars annually, the official manufacture of the MP4-12C began on 2 February 2011. David Cameron, the prime minister of the United Kingdom, officially opened the building on 18 November 2011.

== Design ==
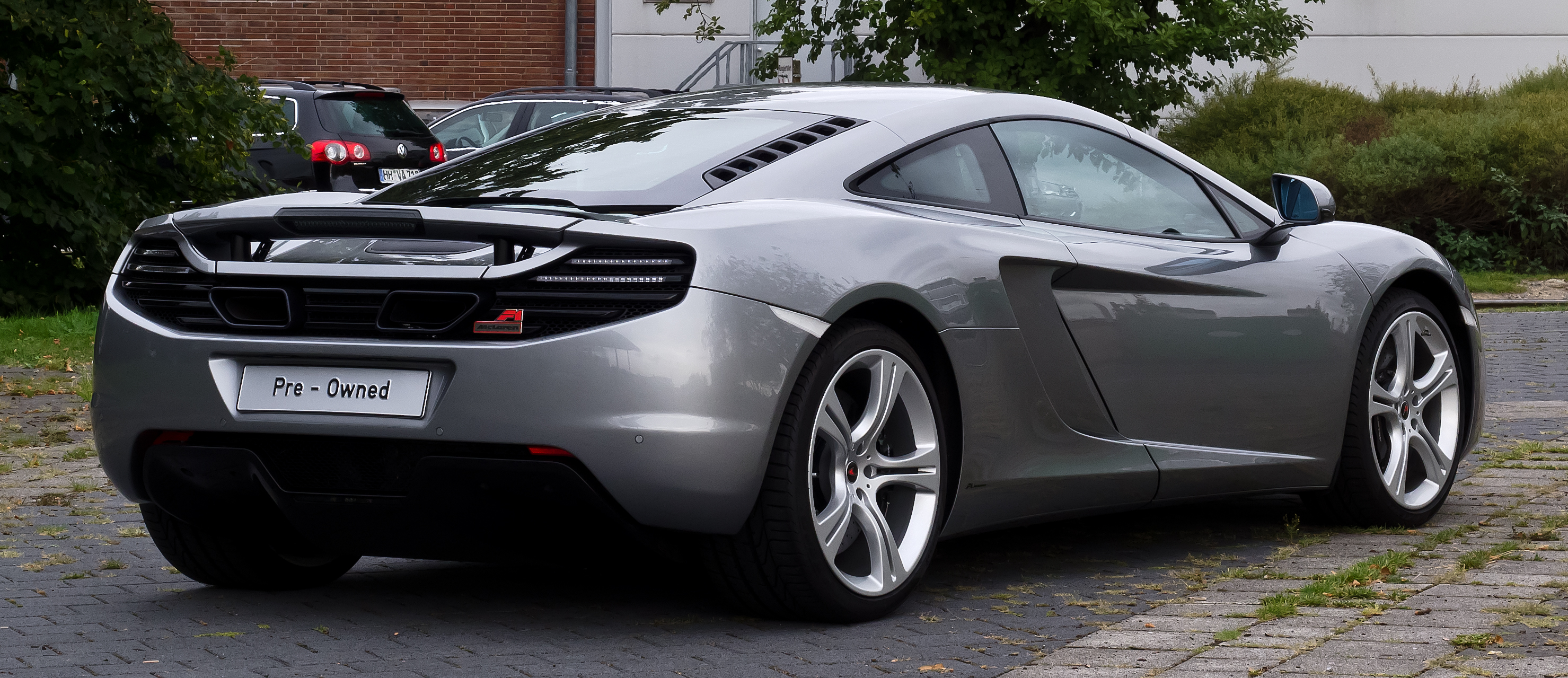
Rear view

The 12C incorporates a carbon fibre structure called the "MonoCell". Compared to traditional riveted alloy structures, the MonoCell's weight is reduced, and its stiffness is improved. The design's cost-effectiveness, swift production and flexibility made it suitable for adoption in other McLaren models. The company invested £127.7 million into the MonoCell. Manufactured by Carbo Tech in Salzburg, Austria, the carbon fibre structure weighs 80 kilograms (176 lb). The advances in carbon fibre fabrication reduced the time required to produce a MonoCell from 3,000 hours for the F1 and 500 hours for the Mercedes-Benz SLR McLaren, to four hours for the 12C. The development of the MonoCell also created approximately 100 new jobs, both in the construction of the new facility and in the production of the monocoque. Carbo Tech went on to manufacture the MonoCell for McLaren cars for over eight years, making this the world's largest carbon fibre order for series-produced cars.

Working with McLaren Automotive in taking this fundamental engineering step in carbon-fibre engineering and production will, we believe, enable carbon technology to establish itself ever more in motor-vehicle production.

— Karl Wagner, Carbo Tech CEO

The 12C is a sports car with the body style of a two-door coupe. It has dihedral doors, and it has a rear-wheel drive layout with a longitudinally-placed mid-engine. The 12C features a double wishbone and hydraulic suspension, the latter referred to as the ProActive Chassis Control. The car uses hydraulically assisted rack-and-pinion power steering powered by an electric pump rather than a traditional belt driven pump from the engine. The standard front brakes of the car feature a four-piston fixed caliper configuration, paired with a two-piece front rotor. The 12C uses a 3.8-litre twin-turbocharged V8 engine codenamed "M838T", which was produced by Ricardo PLC in West Sussex, England. It produces a power output of 453 kilowatts (616 PS) at 7,500 revolutions per minute (rpm) and a torque output of 601 newton-metres (443 lb⋅ft) at 3,000 rpm, sufficient to give the car a 0–97 km/h (0–60 mph) acceleration time of 2.9 seconds and a maximum speed of 333 km/h (207 mph). The car's transmission is a seven-speed dual-clutch manufactured by Graziano called the SSG. (Note: Acronym for "seamless-shift gearbox") Its fuel economy rating is 279 grams per kilometre (15.8 oz/mi), while its average fuel consumption is about 18.5 miles per US gallon (12.7 L/100 km; 22.2 mpg_{‑imp}).

The centre console of the 12C is equipped with a seven-inch touchscreen that controls the Meridian entertainment system and phone functionalities. The car also features Bluetooth and Wi-Fi connectivity options. The vehicle features ultra-low-profile Pirelli tires, with 19-inch wheels at the front and 20-inch wheels at the rear.

== Reception ==
On 10 July 2011, the MP4-12C set the second fastest lap around Top Gear's test track, posting a time of 1 minute and 16.2 seconds. The car was developed and tested by McLaren on the Top Gear test track as part of their product development, long before its appearance on the show. It was 1.1 seconds slower than the Ariel Atom 500 and 2.4 seconds slower than the Pagani Huayra.

The MP4-12C lapped the Nürburgring in 7 minutes and 28 seconds.

The MP4-12C won the Middle East "Car of the Year" Award as "Best Supercar" in 2012 and overall "Car of the Year" at the Middle East Motor Awards the same year.

== Spider ==
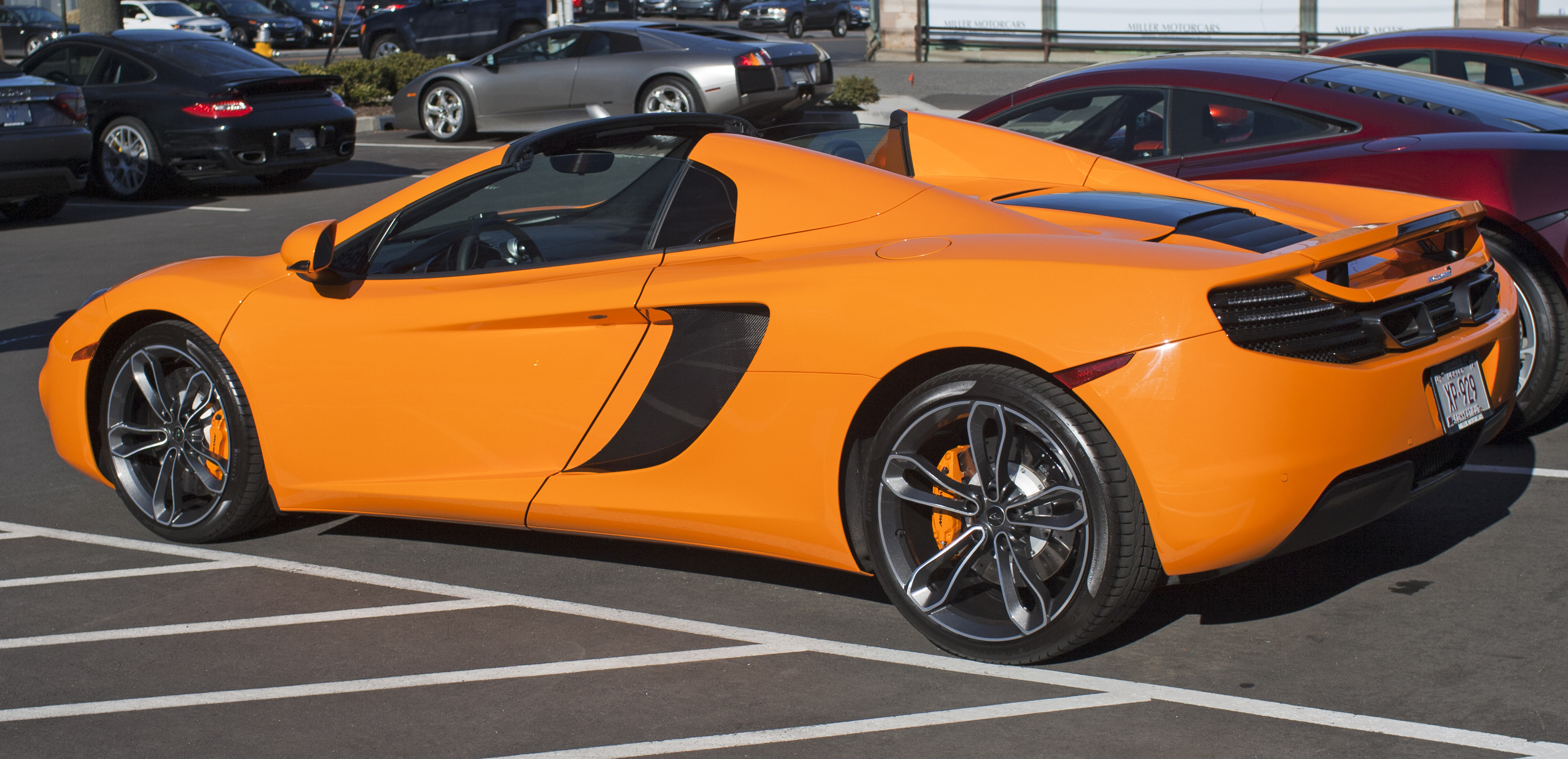
McLaren MP4-12C Spider

The 12C Spider is a convertible version of the MP4-12C with a retractable hardtop. Because the coupe was designed from the outset with a convertible version in mind, no additional strengthening was needed for the Spider and it weighs only 40 kg (88 lb) more than the coupe. McLaren has worked to keep the Spider's top speed 204 mph (328 km/h) close to the coupé's 207 mph (333 km/h) top speed and up to 196 mph (315 km/h) is possible roof down. Meanwhile, the dihedral doors of the coupé are retained.

== MP4-12C HS ==
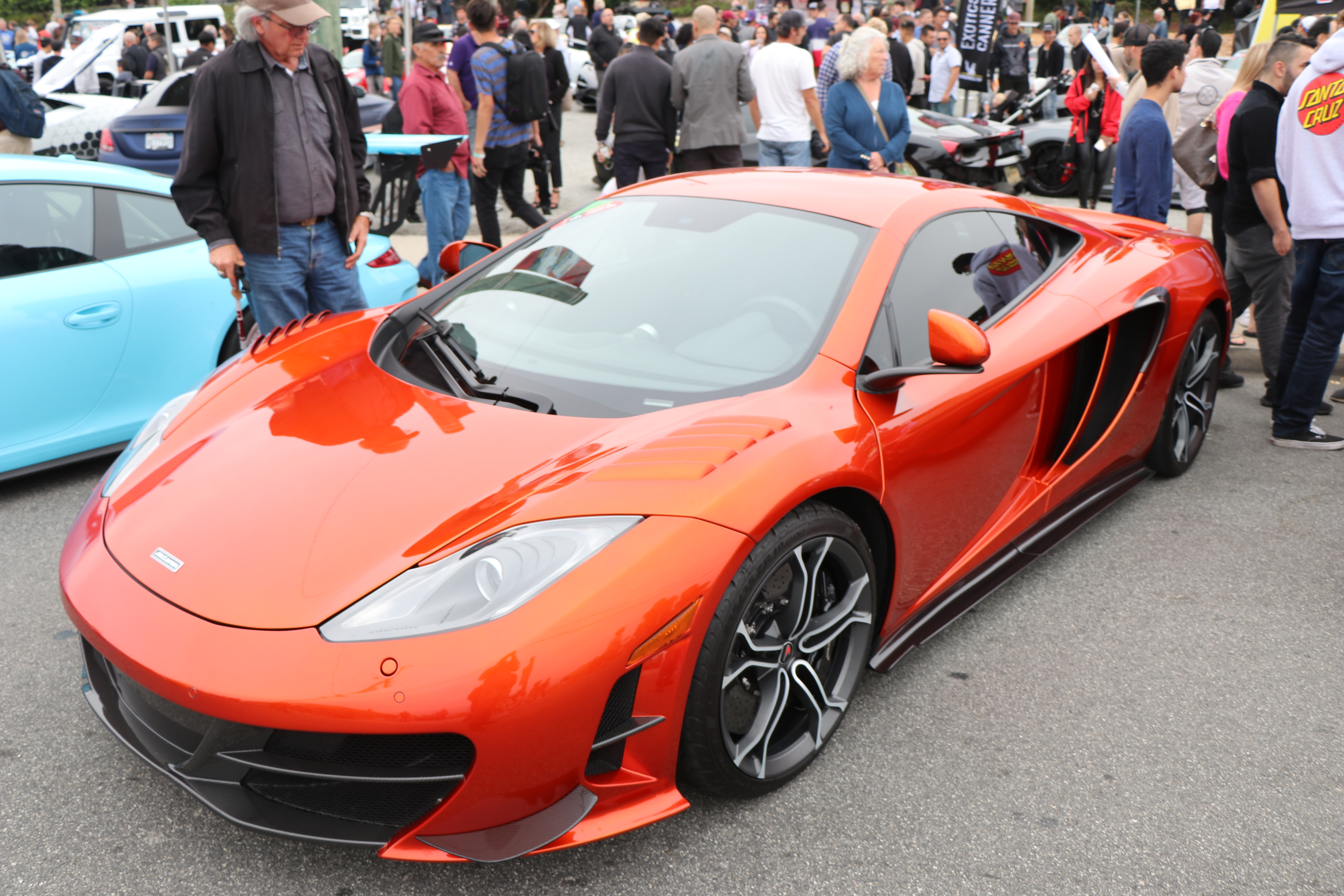
MP4-12C HS

In March 2012, McLaren released pictures of five 12C HS taken in front of the McLaren Technology Center. The HS stands for High Sport. The 12C HS has different wheels and revised aerodynamic features inspired from the 12C GT3 such as a revised front end and rear bumper, larger vents and diffuser and a modified rear wing. Power was also increased by 75 horsepower. Mclaren only made 10 units of the MP4-12C HS. In January 2016, a 12C HS painted in F1 Vodafone Racing Team colours reportedly commissioned by Ron Dennis was offered for sale at Mecum's Kissimmee auction with 203 miles. It had an estimate of $1,300,000 – $1,600,000 and didn't sell. The same F1 Vodafone Racing Team was offered again in January 2017 at Mecum's Kissimmee auction with an estimate of $950,000 – $1,200,000 where it still didn't sell.

== McLaren X-1 ==
The McLaren X-1 is a one-off sports car based on the McLaren 12C and built by McLaren Special Operations (MSO). It was displayed at the 2012 Pebble Beach Concours d'Elegance. According to Paul MacKenzie, MSO Programme Director, the X-1 had been under development for three years. To style the X-1, McLaren used ideas from the 1961 Facel Vega, the 1953 Chrysler D'Elegance Ghia, the 1959 Buick Electra, the Mercedes-Benz 540K, and the Citroën SM.

== Motorsports ==
=== GT3 ===
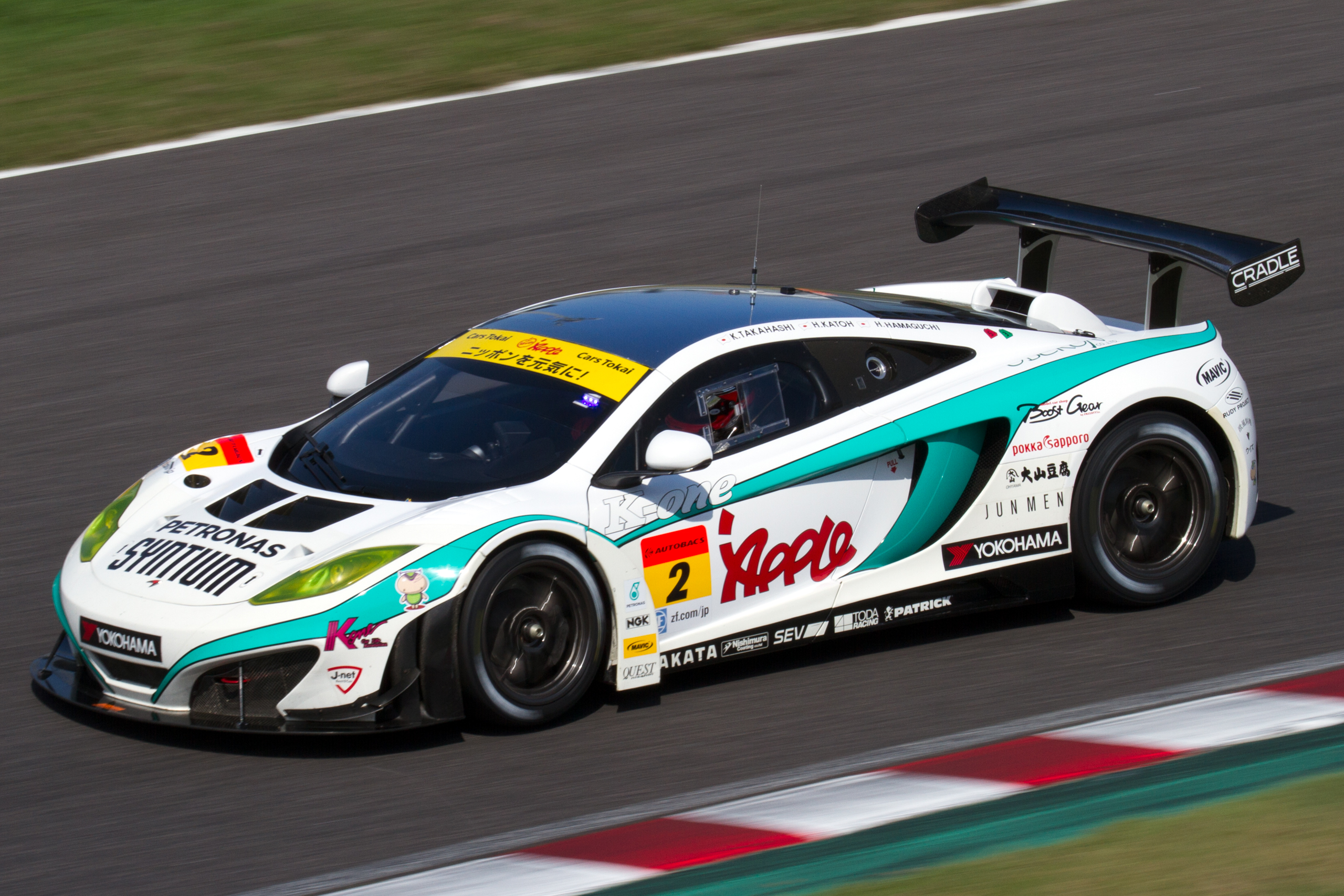
McLaren MP4-12C GT3

In December 2010, McLaren announced that they would produce a small number of MP4-12C cars in order for them to compete in the FIA Group GT3. McLaren stated that they would provide maintenance for the cars and begin racing in 2012 with the CRS Racing team. The MP4-12C was the first car to compete in sportscar racing for the company since the F1 GTR. It received its début with a single car entry for the Spa Francorchamps round of the British GT championship. This was followed by a three car entry in the 2011 Spa 24 Hours. Another car was also entered in the GT cup of the 2011 Macau Grand Prix, driven by Danny Watts.

In March 2012, McLaren readied 25 MP4-12C GT3 cars for a full racing season in the 2012 FIA GT1 World Championship, and its GT drivers tested the car on its Dunsfold test track, the same test track as used in the Top Gear BBC television show. McLaren released several promotional videos for the MP4-12C in the lead up to the racing season, including one of Formula 1 star Lewis Hamilton driving the car at locations in the U.S.

Compared to the road car, the MP4-12C GT3 produces less power with only 493 bhp (368 kW; 500 PS) due to homologation. The car features a bespoke six-speed gearbox that is 80 kg (176 lb) lighter than the road car's seven-speed, developed with Ricardo. The steering wheel is sourced from the McLaren MP4-24 Formula 1 car.

The car took its first victories in the world at the two races of the Circuito de Navarra round of the 2012 FIA GT1 World Championship season being run by Hexis Racing.

== Marketing ==
Tag Heuer produced a limited (1,000 units) series of Carrera MP4-12C Chronograph wrist watch inspired by the MP4-12C sports car. The watch was unveiled in 2011 TAG Heuer Mastering Speed Exhibition at Halle Secheron in Geneva.
